= 2015 Toronto Blue Jays season =

Major League Baseball season

2015 Toronto Blue Jays
- American League East champions
- League: American League
- Division: East
- Ballpark: Rogers Centre
- City: Toronto, Ontario
- Record: 93–69 (.574)
- Divisional place: 1st
- Owners: Rogers; Paul Beeston (CEO)
- General managers: Alex Anthopoulos
- Managers: John Gibbons
- Television: Sportsnet; Sportsnet One (Buck Martinez, Pat Tabler, Joe Siddall, Barry Davis, Jacques Doucet, Rodger Brulotte)
- Radio: Blue Jays Radio Network; Sportsnet 590 the FAN (Jerry Howarth, Joe Siddall, Mike Wilner, Duane Ward)

The Toronto Blue Jays played their 39th season in 2015. This was the 26th full season of play (27th overall) at Rogers Centre.

The Blue Jays clinched a playoff berth on September 25, their first since 1993, ending what was the longest playoff drought in North American professional sports at the time. On September 30, the team clinched the American League East and opened the playoffs by defeating the Texas Rangers in five games, in the ALDS. The Blue Jays were eliminated in a playoff series for the first time since 1991, losing to the eventual World Series champion Kansas City Royals in six games, in the ALCS.

== Off–season ==
The Toronto Blue Jays acquired Marco Estrada, Devon Travis, Josh Donaldson, and Michael Saunders via trades. The Estrada trade was a one-for-one swap of Estrada and Adam Lind, who went to Milwaukee Brewers after the Blue Jays exercised the option on his contract. In addition, both the Travis and Saunders trades were single-player deals. Travis came to Toronto for Anthony Gose, who went to the Detroit Tigers, and Saunders was exchanged for J. A. Happ, who was dealt to the Seattle Mariners. Toronto acquired Donaldson in a five–player trade, sending Brett Lawrie, Kendall Graveman, Sean Nolin, and Franklin Barreto to Oakland Athletics. Barreto played for the Vancouver Canadians in Single A in 2014, while Graveman and Nolin were September additions to the Blue Jays' roster.

In the free agent market, Toronto signed Russell Martin to a five–year contract, non-tendered John Mayberry Jr., and signed Jeff Francis, Ezequiel Carrera, Wilton López, Caleb Gindl, Jake Fox, Daric Barton, and Andrew Albers to minor league contracts with invitations to spring training. Toronto offered Melky Cabrera a $15.3 million qualifying offer which Cabrera subsequently declined. Cabrera eventually signed with the Chicago White Sox on December 14, 2014, pending a medical, which he passed the following day. Toronto was compensated with a draft pick at the end of the first round. On December 16, Toronto signed Daric Barton to a minor league contract with an invitation to spring training. Then Brandon Morrow signed with the San Diego Padres on December 16, 2014.

Justin Smoak was claimed off waivers by Toronto from the Seattle Mariners. He was non-tendered by Toronto, but later signed to a one–year contract. Toronto also claimed Andy Dirks. However, Toronto non–tendered Dirks. Chris Colabello, Juan Oramas, Scott Barnes, and Preston Guilmet were claimed off waivers. Juan Francisco was claimed off waivers by the Boston Red Sox.

Toronto hitting coach Kevin Seitzer left Toronto to become hitting coach of the Atlanta Braves. Brook Jacoby took over as hitting coach. Toronto's bullpen coach Bob Stanley was re–assigned to the minor leagues. Dane Johnson replaced Stanley as bullpen coach. Eric Owens became Toronto's first ever assistant hitting coach.

The Blue Jays avoided arbitration with Brett Cecil, Michael Saunders, and Marco Estrada. The trio signed one-year contracts for salaries of $2.475 million, $2.875 million, and $3.9 million respectively. However, the Blue Jays failed to avoid arbitration with Josh Donaldson and Danny Valencia.

Daniel Norris had surgery to remove "bone spurs and loose bodies" from his left elbow.

In January, the Blue Jays were in extended discussions with the Baltimore Orioles regarding general manager Dan Duquette. The organization wanted to replace Paul Beeston with Duquette, though Duquette was under contract until the end of the 2018 season. Discussions ended when it was reported that Baltimore was seeking a compensation package of 3 first-round selections (Jeff Hoffman, Max Pentecost, and Mitch Nay).

In February, the Blue Jays went to salary arbitration with Danny Valencia and Josh Donaldson, the first two cases for the Blue Jays since the 1997 season. On February 5, Valencia won his arbitration case and was awarded $1.675 million for the 2015 season. Toronto had offered him $1.25 million. A week later, Toronto won the arbitration case with Donaldson, agreeing to pay him $4.3 million. Donaldson had been seeking $5.75 million.

=== Trades ===
Date	Team in transaction	Player(s) acquired	Player(s) departed	Ref.
November 1, 2014	Milwaukee Brewers	Marco Estrada	Adam Lind	
November 12, 2014	Detroit Tigers	Devon Travis	Anthony Gose	
November 28, 2014	Oakland Athletics	Josh Donaldson	Brett Lawrie	
November 28, 2014	Oakland Athletics	Josh Donaldson	Kendall Graveman	
November 28, 2014	Oakland Athletics	Josh Donaldson	Sean Nolin	
November 28, 2014	Oakland Athletics	Josh Donaldson	Franklin Barreto	
December 3, 2014	Seattle Mariners	Michael Saunders	J. A. Happ	

=== Free agency ===
==== In ====
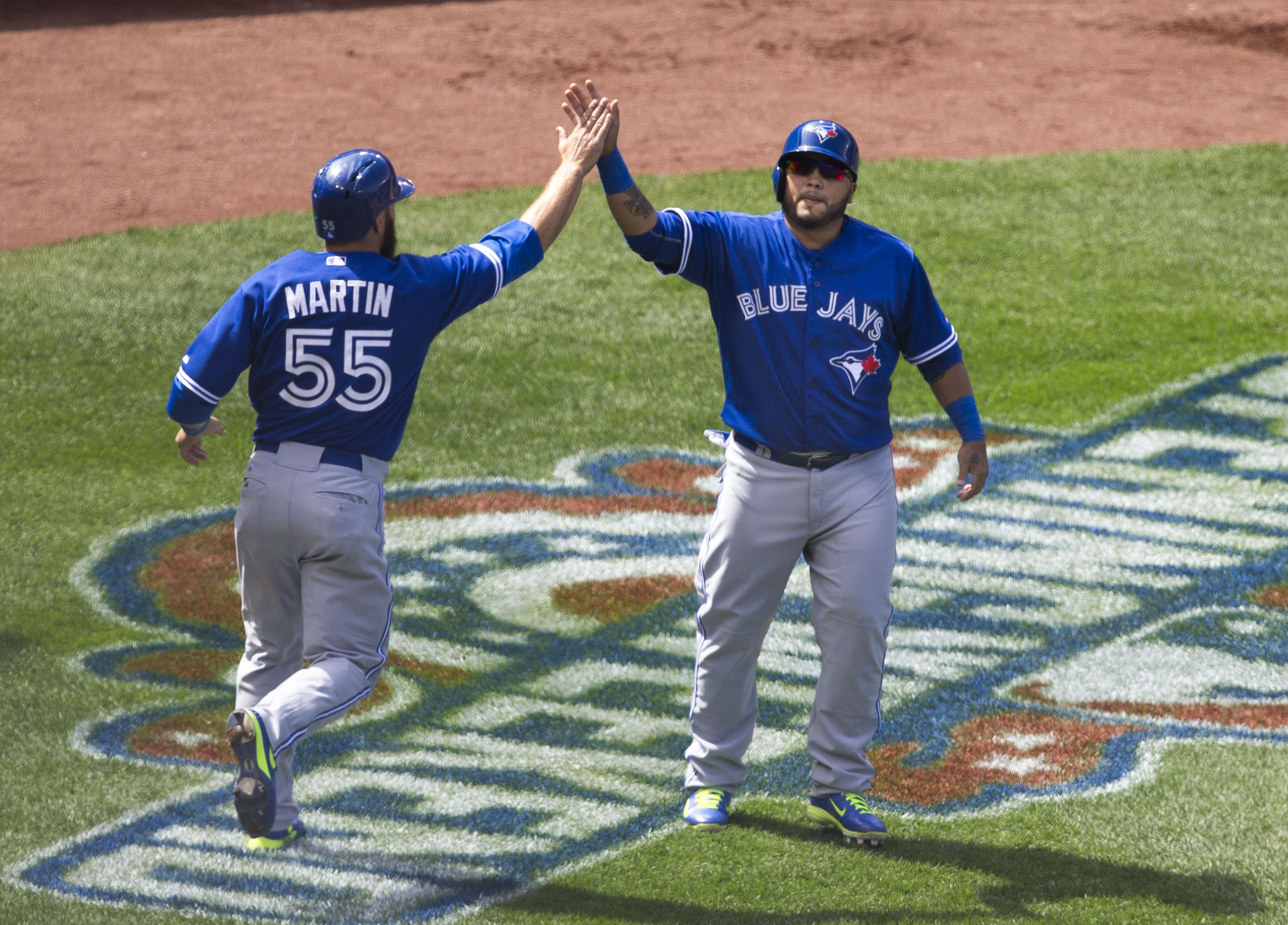
Russell Martin and Dioner Navarro on April 12. The signing of Martin moved Navarro into the backup catcher role. Navarro requested a trade but was not dealt before the start of the season.

Date	Player	Former team	Details	Ref.
October 31, 2014	Jeff Francis	New York Yankees	Minor league contract with an invitation to spring training.	
November 18, 2014	Russell Martin	Pittsburgh Pirates	Five–year contract $82 million over length of contract Annual donation to the Jays Care Foundation.	
December 3, 2014	Justin Smoak	—N/a	One–year, $1 million contract.	
December 3, 2014	Ezequiel Carrera	Detroit Tigers	Minor league contract with an invitation to spring training.	
December 12, 2014	Wilton López	Colorado Rockies	Minor league contract with an invitation to spring training.	
December 12, 2014	Caleb Gindl	Milwaukee Brewers	Minor league contract with an invitation to spring training.	
December 12, 2014	Jake Fox	Philadelphia Phillies	Minor league contract with an invitation to spring training.	
December 16, 2014	Daric Barton	Oakland Athletics	Minor league contract with an invitation to spring training.	
December 19, 2014	Andrew Albers	Hanwha Eagles	Minor league contract with an invitation to spring training.	
January 15, 2015	Andy Dirks	Detroit Tigers	Minor league contract with an invitation to spring training.	
January 30, 2015	Ramón Santiago	Cincinnati Reds	Minor league contract with an invitation to spring training.	
January 31, 2015	Tiago da Silva	Delfines del Carmen	Minor league contract.	
February 6, 2015	Luis Pérez	Atlanta Braves	Minor league contract with an invitation to spring training.	
February 26, 2015	Johan Santana	Baltimore Orioles	Minor league contract with an invitation to spring training.	
March 1, 2015	Dayán Viciedo	Chicago White Sox	Minor league contract with an invitation to spring training.	
March 16, 2015	Randy Wolf	Los Angeles Angels of Anaheim	Minor league contract.	

==== Out ====
Date	Player	New team	Details	Ref.
December 15, 2014	Melky Cabrera	Chicago White Sox	Chicago will forfeit their third round draft pick, and Toronto will receive a draft pick in the supplemental first round.	
December 16, 2014	Brandon Morrow	San Diego Padres	One-year, $2.5 million contract with undisclosed incentives.	
January 20, 2015	Colby Rasmus	Houston Astros	One-year, $8 million contract.	
February 23, 2015	Dustin McGowan	Los Angeles Dodgers	McGowan was later released by the Dodgers, and signed a contract with the Philadelphia Phillies.	

=== Waivers ===
==== In ====
Date	Player	Former team	Ref.
October 28, 2014	Justin Smoak	Seattle Mariners	
October 31, 2014	Andy Dirks	Detroit Tigers	
December 8, 2014	Chris Colabello	Minnesota Twins	
December 19, 2014	Juan Oramas	San Diego Padres	
December 23, 2014	Scott Barnes	Texas Rangers	
December 23, 2014	Preston Guilmet	Pittsburgh Pirates	

==== Out ====
Date	Player	New team	Ref.
November 19, 2014	Juan Francisco	Boston Red Sox	
March 27, 2015	Kyle Drabek	Chicago White Sox	

== Spring training ==
Prior to the official start of spring training, Michael Saunders tore the meniscus in his left knee on February 26 and was initially expected to go on the disabled list until the All-Star break. After undergoing surgery to remove his meniscus his injury outlook improved to between 5 and 6 weeks out of the lineup. On March 10, Marcus Stroman suffered a torn ACL while practising fielding bunts, and was ruled out for the entire 2015 season. Attending spring training for the first time, both Roberto Osuna and Miguel Castro impressed Blue Jays management with their abilities, and both earned positions in the bullpen on the Opening Day roster. The team returned to Montreal's Olympic Stadium on April 3 and April 4, 2015, to face the Cincinnati Reds. The Blue Jays would lose the first game 2–0, but win the finale 9–1. In Grapefruit League play, Toronto finished with a 19–13 record.

== Standings ==
=== American League East ===
AL East
Team	W	L	Pct.	GB	Home	Road
Toronto Blue Jays	93	69	.574	—	53‍–‍28	40‍–‍41
New York Yankees	87	75	.537	6	45‍–‍36	42‍–‍39
Baltimore Orioles	81	81	.500	12	47‍–‍31	34‍–‍50
Tampa Bay Rays	80	82	.494	13	42‍–‍42	38‍–‍40
Boston Red Sox	78	84	.481	15	43‍–‍38	35‍–‍46

=== American League Wild Card ===
Division leaders
Team	W	L	Pct.
Kansas City Royals	95	67	.586
Toronto Blue Jays	93	69	.574
Texas Rangers	88	74	.543

Wild Card teams (Top 2 teams qualify for postseason)
Team	W	L	Pct.	GB
New York Yankees	87	75	.537	+1
Houston Astros	86	76	.531	—
Los Angeles Angels	85	77	.525	1
Minnesota Twins	83	79	.512	3
Cleveland Indians	81	80	.503	4½
Baltimore Orioles	81	81	.500	5
Tampa Bay Rays	80	82	.494	6
Boston Red Sox	78	84	.481	8
Chicago White Sox	76	86	.469	10
Seattle Mariners	76	86	.469	10
Detroit Tigers	74	87	.460	11½
Oakland Athletics	68	94	.420	18

== Records vs opponents ==
	Record			Games Left		
Opponent	Home	Road	Total	Home	Road	Total
AL East
Baltimore Orioles	6–3	5–5	11–8	–	–	–
Boston Red Sox	4–6	5–4	9–10	–	–	–
New York Yankees	5–4	8–2	13–6	–	–	–
Tampa Bay Rays	6–4	3–6	9–10	–	–	–
Totals	21–17	21–17	42–34	–	–	–
AL Central
Chicago White Sox	2–1	1–3	3–4	–	–	–
Cleveland Indians	2–1	2–2	4–3	–	–	–
Detroit Tigers	3–0	1–2	4–2	–	–	–
Kansas City Royals	3–1	1–2	4–3	–	–	–
Minnesota Twins	4–0	1–2	5–2	–	–	–
Totals	14–3	6–11	20–14	–	–	–
AL West
Houston Astros	3–0	0–4	3–4	–	–	–
Los Angeles Angels	2–2	3–0	5–2	–	–	–
Oakland Athletics	3–0	2–1	5–1	–	–	–
Seattle Mariners	1–2	1–2	2–4	–	–	–
Texas Rangers	2–1	2–1	4–2	–	–	–
Totals	11–5	8–8	19–13	–	–	–
National League
Atlanta Braves	1–2	2–1	3–3	–	–	–
Miami Marlins	3–0	–	3–0	–	–	–
New York Mets	2–0	0–2	2–2	–	–	–
Philadelphia Phillies	1–1	1–1	2–2	–	–	–
Washington Nationals	–	2–1	2–1	–	–	–
Totals	7–3	5–5	12–8	–	–	–
Grand Totals	53–28	40–41	93–69	–	–	–

Month	Games	Won	Lost	Pct.
April	23	11	12	.478
May	29	12	17	.414
June	27	18	9	.667
July	25	12	13	.480
August	27	21	6	.778
September	27	18	9	.667
October	4	1	3	.250
Totals	162	93	69	.574

2015 American League record Source: MLB Standings Grid – 2015
Team	BAL	BOS	CWS	CLE	DET	HOU	KC	LAA	MIN	NYY	OAK	SEA	TB	TEX	TOR	NL
Baltimore	—	11–8	3–3	5–1	4–3	3–4	3–4	2–4	0–7	10–9	6–1	3–3	10–9	1–6	8–11	12–8
Boston	8–11	—	3–4	2–4	4–2	2–4	4–3	2–5	2–5	8–11	5–1	4–3	9–10	2–5	10–9	13–7
Chicago	3–3	4–3	—	10–9	9–10	5–1	7–12	4–3	6–13	2–5	5–2	4–3	1–5	3–3	4–3	9–11
Cleveland	1–5	4–2	9–10	—	7–11	5–2	9–10	4–2	7–12	5–2	3–4	4–3	5–2	3–3	3–4	12–8
Detroit	3–4	2–4	10–9	11–7	—	3–4	9–10	1–6	11–8	2–5	2–4	4–3	3–3	2–5	2–4	9–11
Houston	4–3	4–2	1–5	2–5	4–3	—	4–2	10–9	3–3	4–3	10–9	12–7	2–5	6–13	4–3	16–4
Kansas City	4–3	3–4	12–7	10–9	10–9	2–4	—	6–1	12–7	2–4	5–1	4–2	6–1	3–4	3–4	13–7
Los Angeles	4–2	5–2	3–4	2–4	6–1	9–10	1–6	—	5–2	2–4	11–8	12–7	3–3	12–7	2–5	8–12
Minnesota	7–0	5–2	13–6	12–7	8–11	3–3	7–12	2–5	—	1–5	4–3	4–3	4–2	3–3	2–5	8–12
New York	9–10	11–8	5–2	2–5	5–2	3–4	4–2	4–2	5–1	—	3–4	5–1	12–7	2–5	6–13	11–9
Oakland	1–6	1–5	2–5	4–3	4–2	9–10	1–5	8–11	3–4	4–3	—	6–13	3–4	10–9	1–5	11–9
Seattle	3–3	3–4	3–4	3–4	3–4	7–12	2–4	7–12	3–4	1–5	13–6	—	4–3	12–7	4–2	8–12
Tampa Bay	9–10	10–9	5–1	2–5	3–3	5–2	1–6	3–3	2–4	7–12	4–3	3–4	—	2–5	10–9	14–6
Texas	6–1	5–2	3–3	3–3	5–2	13–6	4–3	7–12	3–3	5–2	9–10	7–12	5–2	—	2–4	11–9
Toronto	11–8	9–10	3–4	4–3	4–2	3–4	4–3	5–2	5–2	13–6	5–1	2–4	9–10	4–2	—	12–8

== 2015 draft ==
The 2015 Major League Baseball draft was held on June 8–10.

Round	Pick	Player	Position	College/School	Nationality	Signed
1*	29	Jon Harris	RHP	Missouri State University (MO)	(United States)	June 15
2	56	Brady Singer	RHP	Eustis High School (FL)	(United States)	Unsigned
3	91	Justin Maese	RHP	Ysleta High School (TX)	(United States)	June 15
4	122	Carl Wise	3B	College of Charleston (SC)	(United States)	June 15
5	152	Jose Espada	RHP	Jose Collazo Colon High School (PR)	(Puerto Rico)	June 15
6	182	JC Cardenas	SS	Barry University (FL)	(United States)	June 15
7	212	Travis Bergen	LHP	Kennesaw State University (GA)	(United States)	June 15
8	242	Daniel Young	LHP	University of Florida (FL)	(United States)	June 26
9	272	Connor Panas	3B	Canisius College (NY)	(Canada)	June 15
10	302	Owen Spiwak	C	Odessa College (TX)	(Canada)	June 15

- – Toronto forfeited the 16th overall selection after signing Russell Martin, but received the 29th overall pick when Melky Cabrera signed with the Chicago White Sox.

== Regular season ==
=== Opening Day ===
Opening Day starters
Position	Name
Catcher	Russell Martin
First baseman	Edwin Encarnación
Second baseman	Devon Travis
Shortstop	José Reyes
Third baseman	Josh Donaldson
Left fielder	Kevin Pillar
Center fielder	Dalton Pompey
Right fielder	José Bautista
Designated hitter	Dioner Navarro
Pitcher	Drew Hutchison

=== April ===
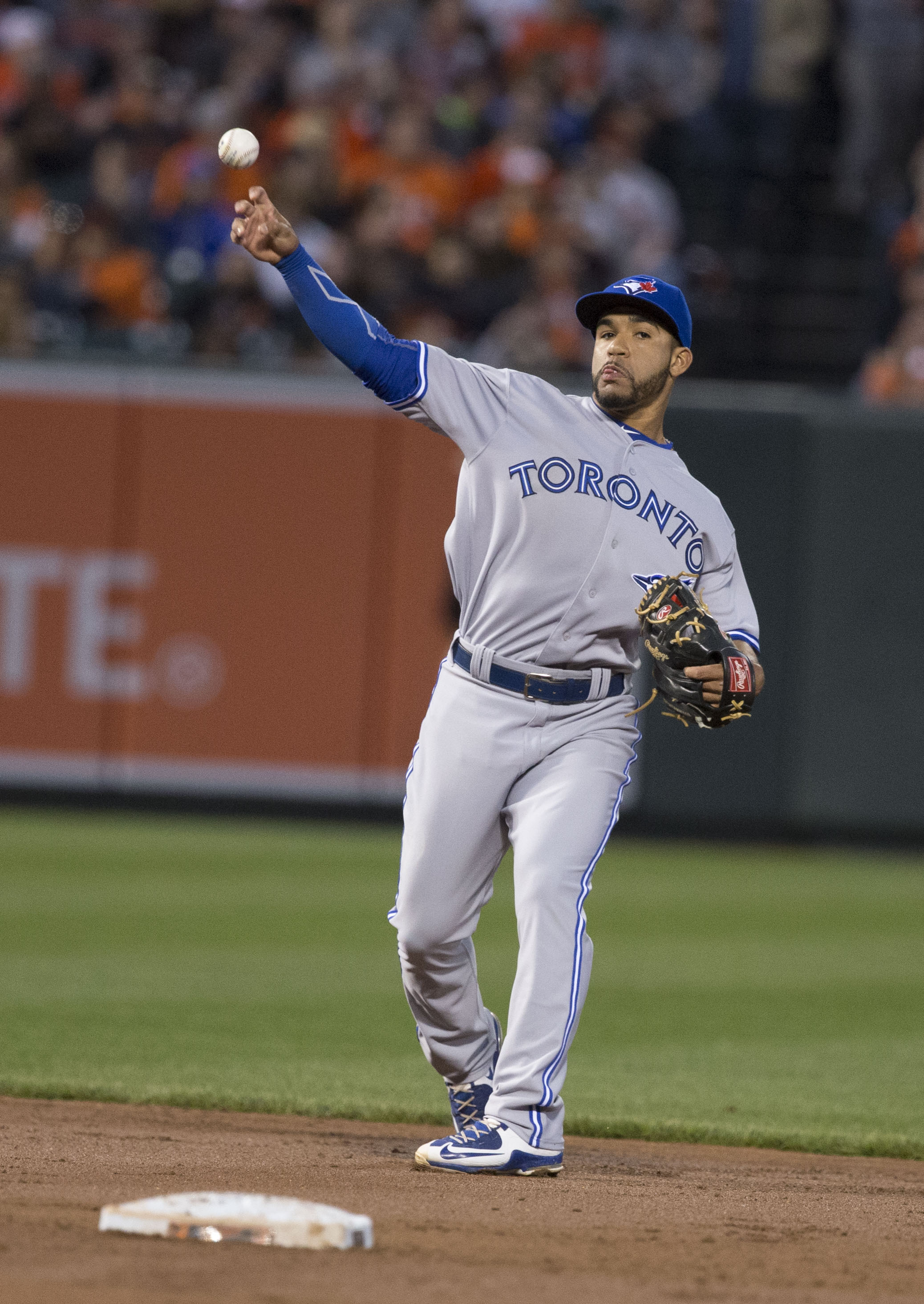
Devon Travis was named the American League Rookie of the Month for his performance in April.

The Blue Jays played against the New York Yankees at Yankee Stadium on Opening Day and won, 6–1. Toronto scored five runs in the third inning. Prospects Devon Travis and Miguel Castro made their MLB debuts, with Travis recording his first career hit, a solo home run. Drew Hutchison, who became the youngest opening day starter in Blue Jays history, pitched six innings giving up three hits, including a solo home run to Brett Gardner. Castro got the final four outs to close out the game. With the win, the Blue Jays opening day record improved to 20–19. After an off-day, Toronto suffered a 4–3 loss to New York. Entering the 8th inning with a 3–1 lead, Aaron Loup put all three batters he faced on base, before Brett Cecil entered the game and allowed all three to score. Due to his poor performance, Cecil was temporarily moved out of the closer role, and was replaced by Miguel Castro. In the series finale, prospect Daniel Norris earned his first MLB win, while Castro closed out the game for his first MLB save as the Blue Jays won 6–3. Toronto got five singles in the second inning to get four runs. Toronto won the series 2–1.

Travelling to Camden Yards for the first time in 2015, Mark Buehrle won his 200th career game as Toronto defeated Baltimore 12–5. Toronto scored four runs in the top of the first inning and another five runs in the fourth inning. José Bautista got his first three hits of the season and left in the bottom of the sixth inning as the result of minor cramping in his calves. Aaron Sanchez, another of Toronto's top prospects, made his first career MLB start against Ubaldo Jiménez the following night, but would last just 3 1/3 innings and yield 3 earned runs. The Blue Jays would lose the game 7–1. Toronto would win the rubber match 10–7, with Kevin Pillar, Dalton Pompey, and José Bautista each hitting their first home runs of the season.

Holding a 4–2 record, the Blue Jays played at home for the first time in 2015 against the Tampa Bay Rays on April 13. R. A. Dickey would get the start in his third home opener, and yield 2 runs on back-to-back bases-loaded walks. Toronto would go on to lose 2–1, their fourth consecutive loss in a home opener. After a 3–2 loss the following night, the Blue Jays won their first home game of the season, defeating the Rays 12–7 on Jackie Robinson Day. Toronto would lose the series finale, 4–2. Jose Reyes left the game in the first inning with an oblique strain, and was expected to miss at least 3 games. In their first interleague series of the season, the Blue Jays took on the Atlanta Braves in Toronto. Despite hitting 5 home runs, including the first 2 of the season by Josh Donaldson and Russell Martin, Toronto would lose the first game 8–7. In the second game, Miguel Castro would take his first blown save of the season, yielding a ninth-inning solo home run to former Blue Jay Kelly Johnson that tied the game at 5–5. In the tenth inning, Josh Donaldson hit a walk-off home run to give Toronto the win, 6–5. The Blue Jays would lose the final game of the series, 5–2. Devon Travis left the game in the first inning after being hit by a pitch near his ribcage. X-rays were negative for a fracture, and he was considered day to day.

After an off day, the Blue Jays played against the Orioles at home. Toronto would win the first game of the series, 13–6. Tensions nearly boiled over when Jason Garcia threw behind Jose Bautista, and three pitches later, Bautista hit a home run, watching it all the way and slowly rounding the bases. Between innings Bautista and Adam Jones exchanged words, and after the game Jones claimed that Garcia's pitch was unintentional. Bautista cited the previous series against Baltimore, in which reliever Darren O'Day threw behind him and he would hit a home run off O'Day in the same at-bat. Bautista would miss the following game with a right shoulder strain. Devon Travis returned to the lineup and hit a go-ahead two-run home run in the fifth inning to lead Toronto to a 4–2 victory. The Blue Jays would complete their first sweep of the season, beating Baltimore 7–6 on April 23. Drew Hutchison pitched 8 innings, taking a perfect game into the sixth inning, and became the first Toronto starter to go 8 innings in the 2015 season.

Beginning a 10-game road trip, the Blue Jays travelled to Tropicana Field in Tampa Bay to take on the Rays and were swept, losing 12–3, 4–2, and 5–1 in the three-game set. Daniel Norris, who started the second game of the series, pitched the longest MLB game of his career, and appeared to overcome what he had described as a "dead arm" phase. Jose Bautista did not appear in any of the games due to his shoulder strain. Bautista returned to the lineup as the designated hitter when the Blue Jays opened a 3-game set at Fenway Park in Boston. Toronto lost the first game of the series, 6–5, extending their losing streak to 4. After the game, Jose Reyes was placed on the disabled list with a rib injury. Toronto would snap their losing streak the following night, defeating the Red Sox 11–8. In the finale, Toronto lost 4–1. The Blue Jays then travelled to Cleveland, and won their last April game 5–1, ending the month with an 11–12 record.

=== May ===
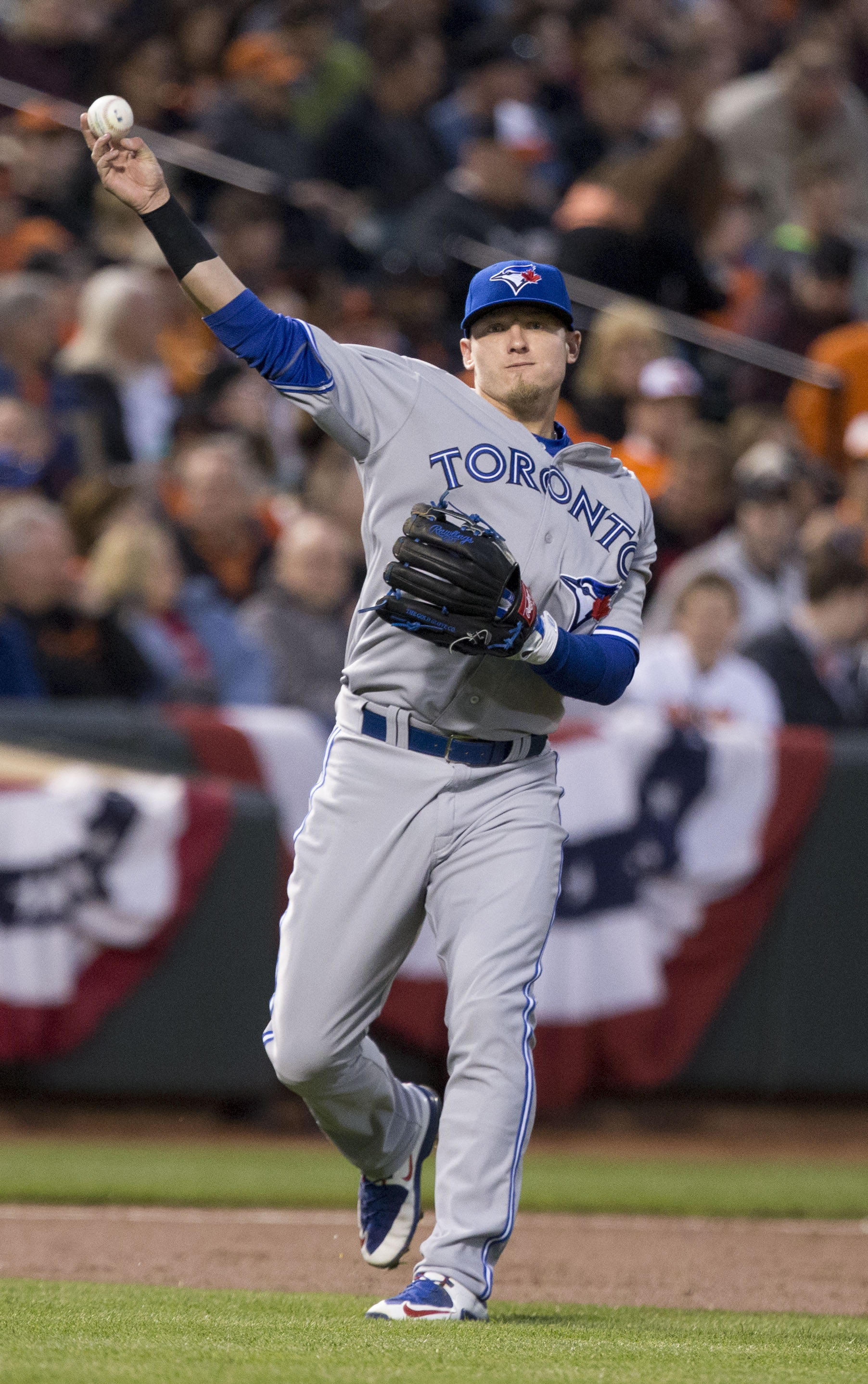
Josh Donaldson hit 10 home runs in May, including 6 in the final week of the month to win the American League Player of the Week award.

Toronto lost the first game of May by a score of 9–4. Before the game, top prospect Daniel Norris was optioned back to Triple-A Buffalo, and Marco Estrada was announced as his replacement in the starting rotation. Canadian pitcher Andrew Albers was added to the 40-man roster after Maicer Izturis was moved to the 60-day disabled list. After the game, Albers was optioned to Triple-A Buffalo along with Dalton Pompey. Pitcher Scott Copeland and outfielder Ezequiel Carrera were called up to replace Albers and Pompey. The Blue Jays would defeat reigning Cy Young winner Corey Kluber the following day, by a score of 11–4. In the final game of the series, the Blue Jays held a 6–1 lead but would end up losing 10–7. Devon Travis hit the first grand slam of his career, increasing his season total to 7 as well as bringing his RBI total to 23, both of which led the team to that point. Following the loss, the Blue Jays demoted Miguel Castro and Scott Copeland, and recalled Chad Jenkins and Steve Delabar from Buffalo to replace them.

Returning home after a disappointing 3–7 road trip, the Blue Jays took on the first-place Yankees. R. A. Dickey earned his first win of the season as the Blue Jays came from behind late to win 3–1. In the second game, Marco Estrada made his first start for Toronto, but the team was shut down by Yankees starter Michael Pineda, losing 6–3. In the rubber match, Mark Buehrle and the Blue Jays defeated the Yankees, 5–1. Buehrle raised his career record against the Yankees to 2–14, winning for the first time since 2004. After an off-day, the Blue Jays played the Red Sox at home for the first time this season. Aaron Sanchez recorded his first career quality start as the Blue Jays won the first game, 7–0. The win was their first shutout of the season, as well as the 3,000th win in franchise history. In the second game of the series, Drew Hutchison earned his third win of the season as Toronto defeated Boston 7–1. Toronto would lose the final game of their homestand, 6–3.

The Blue Jays began a 7-game road trip in Baltimore on May 11. The game played that night was the first to be played in Baltimore following the empty-stadium game played on April 29, due to the 2015 Baltimore protests. Toronto would lose, 5–2. In the second game, Toronto would come from behind 2–0 to win 10–2, helped by a two-home run night from Edwin Encarnacion. Toronto lost the rubber match, 6–1, and did not record an extra-base hit for the first time in the 2015 season. The loss also broke a 31-game streak with at least 1 double. The Blue Jays then travelled to Houston, taking on the AL West-leading Astros. Toronto was swept by Houston, losing 6–4, 8–4, 6–5, and 4–2. Following their third loss to Houston, Josh Donaldson called out his teammates for their poor play, stating "this isn't the 'try' league, this is the 'get it done' league. And you know, eventually they're gonna find people who are going to get it done."

Toronto opened a 10-game homestand against the Los Angeles Angels of Anaheim on May 18. Roberto Osuna earned his first career win in the Blue Jays 10–6 victory. The Blue Jays would get strong starting pitching but lose the next two games in the series, each by a single run. In the final game, R. A. Dickey pitched his first complete game victory at home as a Blue Jay, winning 8–4. The Seattle Mariners then came to Toronto for a 3-game set. The Blue Jays pitching continued to improve, but their offence was shut down by Felix Hernandez and James Paxton in the first two games, losing 4–3 and 3–2. Toronto would win the final game of the series, 8–2, aided by another strong pitching performance by Aaron Sanchez. Closing the homestand, the Blue Jays took on the Chicago White Sox. Drew Hutchison pitched his second career complete game shutout in the first game of the series, winning 6–0. In the second game, the Blue Jays received excellent offensive performances from Jose Bautista and Josh Donaldson, winning 10–9. Bautista had 3 doubles and 5 RBI, while Donaldson went 4–4 with 5 runs scored and two home runs, one of which was a walk-off, 3-run home run. The Jays would lose the finale of the series 5–3 in the tenth inning. Josh Donaldson hit a ninth-inning home run to tie the game and send it to extras, bringing him to three straight games with at least one home run.

Toronto would travel to Minnesota to close out the month of May by taking on the first-place Twins. In the first game of the series, Mark Buehrle allowed 4 runs in the first inning, but after that faced the minimum number of batters in pitching a complete game. Josh Donaldson hit a three-run home run in the fifth inning, his fourth straight game with a home run. Chris Colabello, making his first start against his former team, hit a go-ahead two-run home run in the ninth inning to help defeat the Twins 6–4. Toronto would lose the final two games of the month, each by a single run, bringing their record in one-run games to a dismal 3–12.

=== June ===
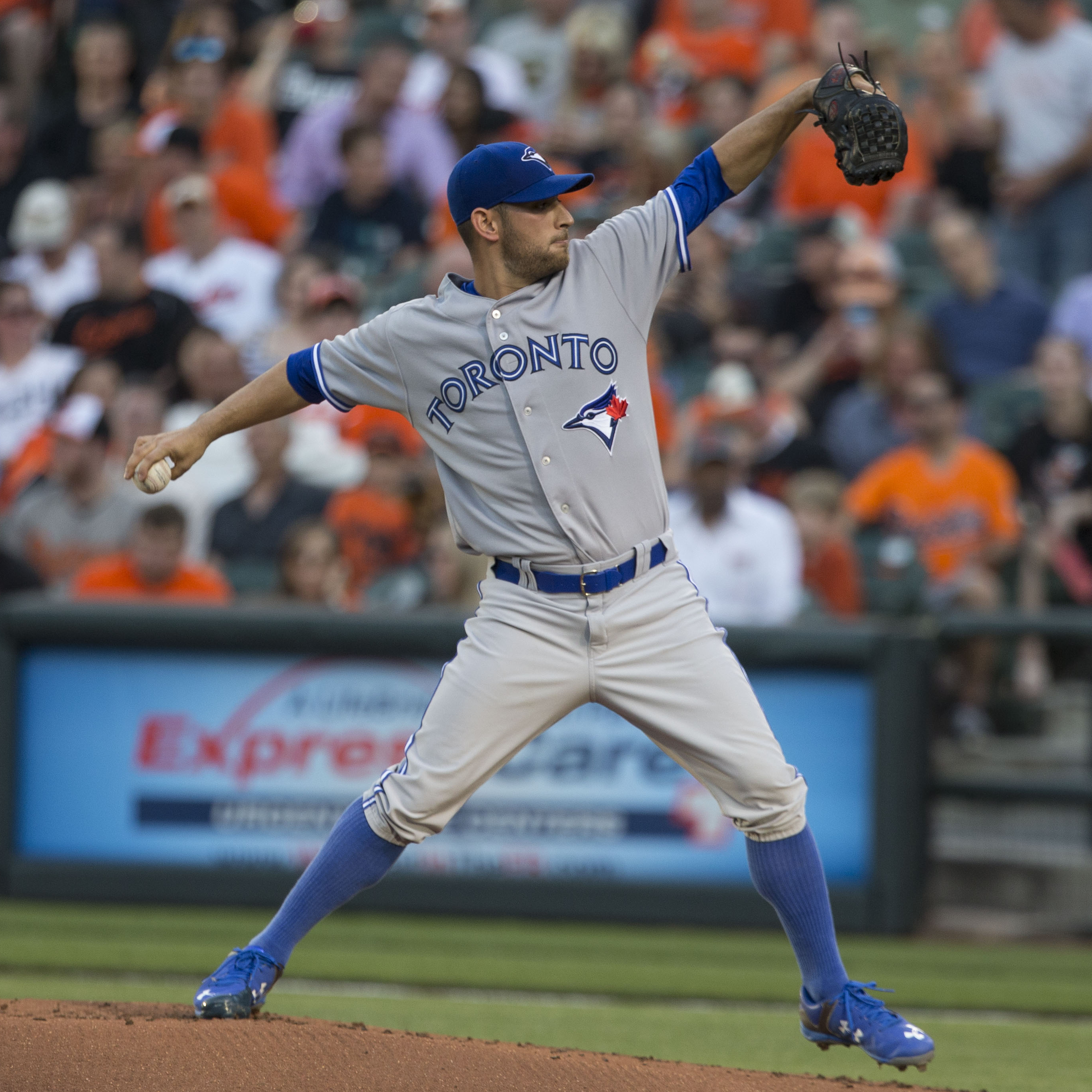
Marco Estrada took no-hitters into the 8th inning in back-to-back starts in June, finishing the month with a 4–1 record and a 3.25 earned run average.

The Blue Jays opened June with a three-game series against the Washington Nationals. The first game of the series was rained out and rescheduled as a doubleheader for the following day. In the first game of the doubleheader, Toronto was shut out for the first time in the 2015 season, losing 2–0. The team rebounded from their shutout and defeated the Nationals 7–3 in the second game, aided by Kevin Pillar's first career multi-home run game. In the rubber match, Toronto beat Washington, 8–0, and won their first series on the road since taking two of three from the Baltimore Orioles in early April. Mark Buehrle recorded his league-leading third complete game, and earned his first shutout of the season. He also pitched his second consecutive complete game, the first time he had done so in over a decade.

The Jays returned home after a 3–3 road trip to take on the Houston Astros for the first time since suffering a four-game sweep against them in May. In the first game, Aaron Sanchez established a new career high with 8 innings pitched and did not walk a batter for the first time as a starter. The Blue Jays won the game by a score of 6–2. Aided by another strong starting pitching performance from Drew Hutchison, the Blue Jays earned their first four-game winning streak of 2015 by beating the Astros 7–2 in the second game of the series. In the final game of the series, Chris Colabello extended his hitting streak to 17 games in the bottom of the ninth inning, when he singled and drove in Jose Reyes and Jose Bautista to give the Blue Jays a walk-off victory, 7–6, and their second sweep of the season. The Miami Marlins made their first trip to Toronto since the 2012 trade between the two clubs that exchanged 12 players. In the first game, the Blue Jays knocked Marlins' starter Brad Hand out in the first inning, en route to an 11–3 win. In the second game of the series, Edwin Encarnacion hit a two-run walk-off home run to extend the Blue Jays' winning streak to 7 games. Chris Colabello failed to record a hit, ending his 18-game hitting streak. Toronto would complete the sweep on June 10, aided by 4 home runs, and capped a 6–0 homestand by winning 7–2. Scott Copeland made his first major league start and took the win, pitching 7 innings and yielding only 1 run.

Toronto travelled to Fenway park for the second time in 2015 following their perfect homestand. In the first game of the series, the Red Sox led the Jays 8–1 at one point; however, Toronto came back to win 13–10, aided by a 9-run seventh inning. The second game went into extra innings tied 4–4, after the Blue Jays surrendered a 4–0 lead. Russell Martin hit a solo home run in the eleventh inning, aiding the Jays to their 10th straight victory. In the finale, Toronto scored 9 runs off Boston starter Eduardo Rodriguez and won 13–5, sweeping the Red Sox. The Blue Jays extended their winning streak to 11 games, tying the franchise-record. The team then played a home-and-home series against the New York Mets, with the first two games being played at Citi Field. The Mets ended Toronto's 11-game win streak with a walk-off single in the first game, defeating the Jays, 4–3. The Blue Jays would lose the next game 3–2, after being shut down most of the game by Mets starter Matt Harvey. Returning to the Rogers Centre, Toronto rebounded from back-to-back 1-run losses by beating the Mets 8–0. In the final game of the series, R. A. Dickey and Bartolo Colon faced off in the first matchup of pitchers older than 40 since Jamie Moyer pitched against Greg Maddux in 2008. Dickey would lead the Blue Jays to a 7–1 win over the Mets, splitting the series at 2-games apiece.

Still undefeated at home in June, Toronto played a three-game series against the Orioles. In the first game, Marco Estrada took a no-hitter into the eighth inning, and left with a 5–0 lead. The Blue Jays won the game 5–4, with Brett Cecil surrendering 2 runs in the ninth inning. The second game was tied 2–2 into the ninth inning, but Aaron Loup gave up 3 runs to break the tie. Toronto's rally fell short in their half of the ninth, losing 5–3. The rubber match was a battle of offence, as both Scott Copeland and Chris Tillman lasted only 1 1/3 innings and allowed 7 and 6 runs respectively. Toronto came from behind 7–0 to lead 9–7, but the bullpen again failed to hold the lead, with Cecil allowing 4 runs in the ninth and the Jays losing a home series for the first time in a month. The team then travelled to Tampa Bay for three games against the Rays. They opened the series with an 8–5 win, though Drew Hutchison continued to struggle with his efficiency, needing 109 pitched to get through 5 innings. R. A. Dickey returned from the bereavement list and started the second game, but Chris Archer got the better of the Blue Jays for the third time in 2015, as the Rays won, 4–3. In the final game, Marco Estrada took a perfect game into the eighth inning, though he left with the game tied 0–0. Chris Colabello hit a go-ahead home run in the twelfth and Steve Delabar earned his first save of the season as the Blue Jays took 2 of 3 from the Rays.

Toronto returned to the Rogers Centre to play their final 7 home games before the All-Star break, opening with 3 against the Texas Rangers. In the first game, the offence scored double digit runs for the league-leading 13th time in 2015, backing another strong performance by Mark Buehrle to win 12–2. Edwin Encarnacion recorded his 20th career multi-home run game, hitting his 7th career grand slam in the first inning and a solo shot in the seventh. Prospect Matt Boyd made his MLB debut in the second game, but yielded 4 runs and took the loss as the team was shut out for the second time in 2015, 4–0. The Blue Jays won the finale, 3–2, and earned their third win when scoring less than 4 runs in a game. Closing out the month, Toronto would lose to the Red Sox 3–1 and 4–3, finishing June with an 18–9 record and only 1 game back in the AL East.

=== July ===
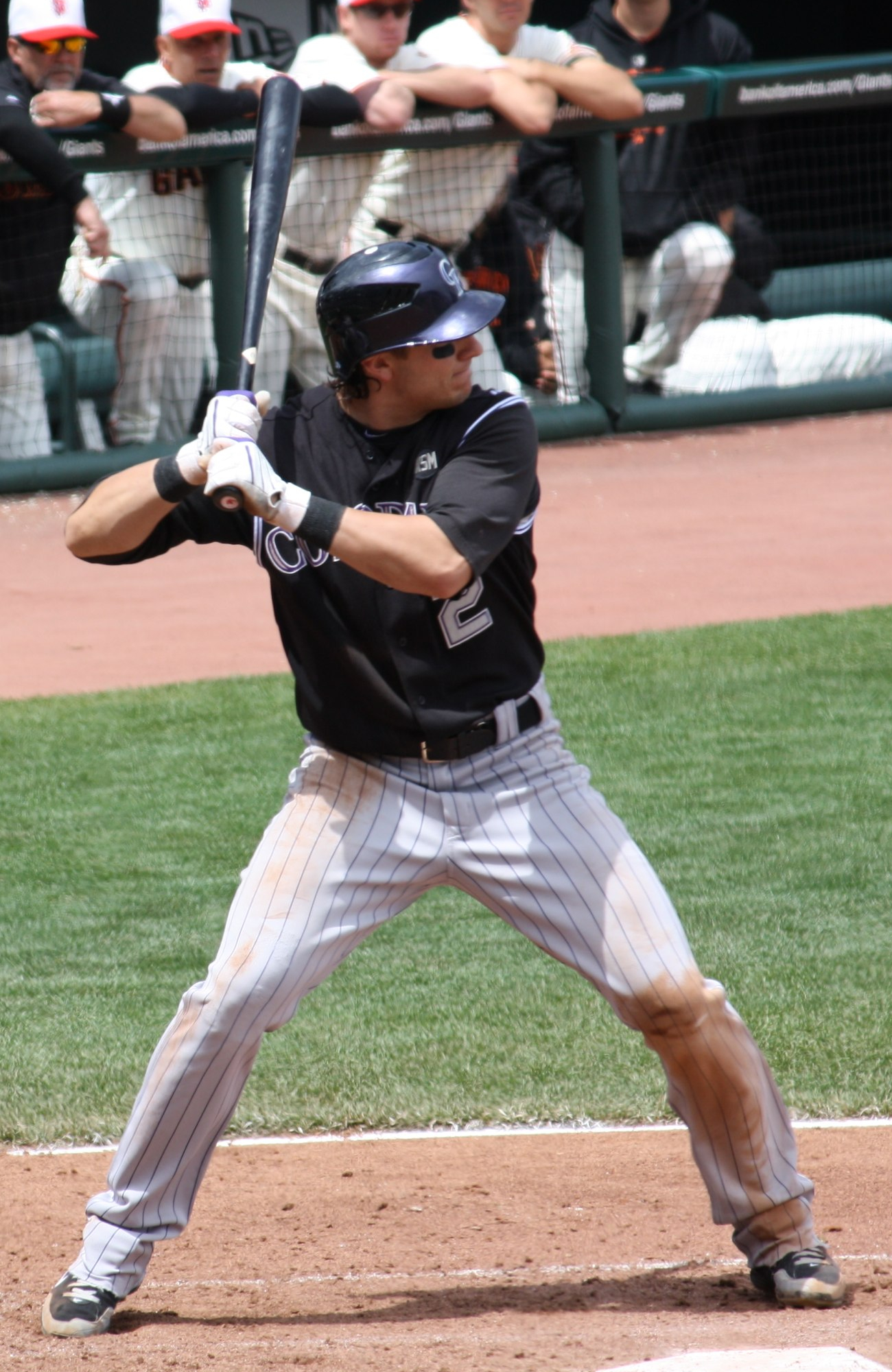
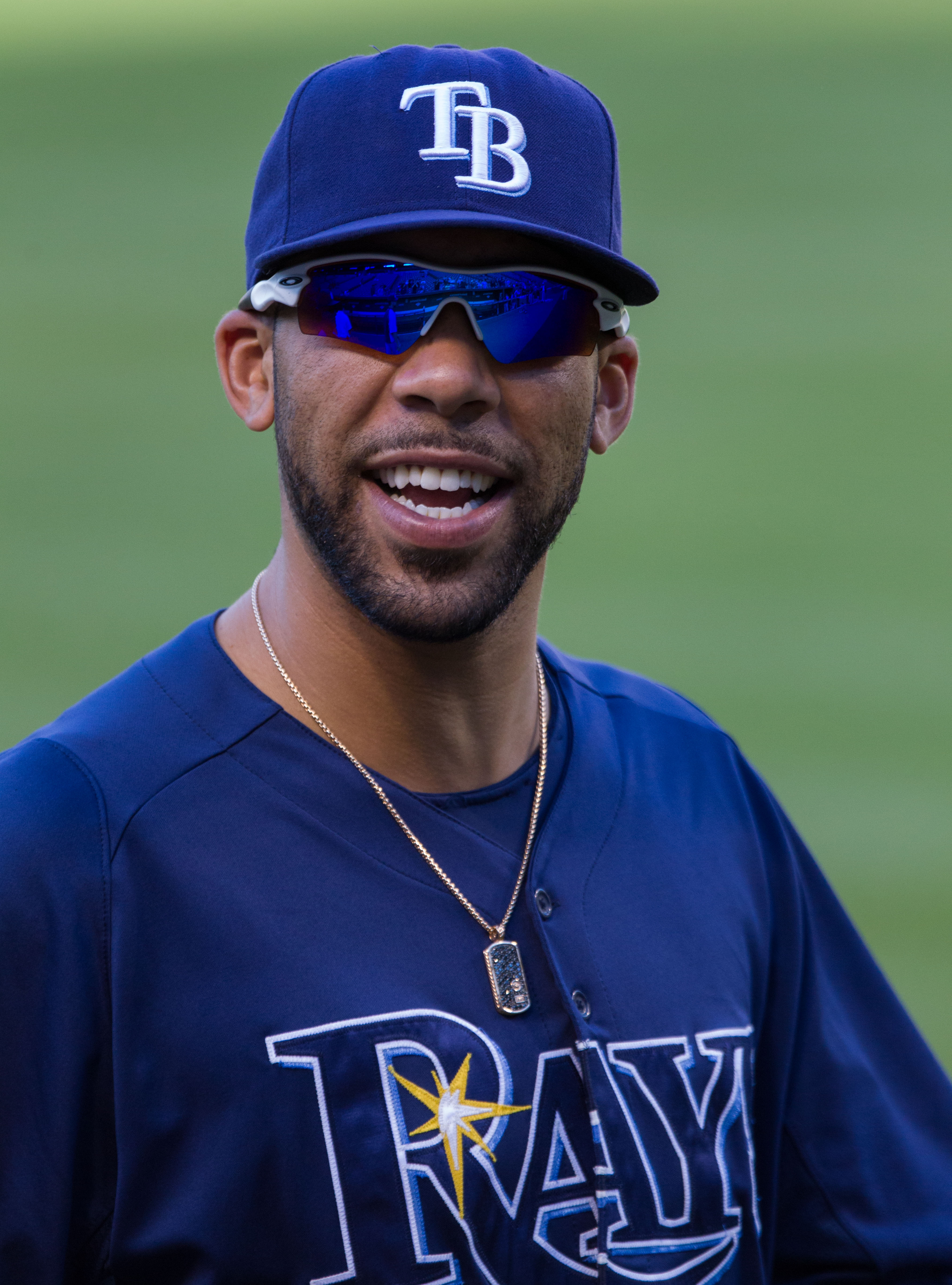
The Blue Jays improved their line-up by acquiring All-Stars Troy Tulowitzki and David Price before the July 31 trade deadline.

The Blue Jays opened July with a win over the Red Sox on Canada Day, 11–2, backed by 5 home runs and another strong start by Mark Buehrle. Toronto lost the finale, 12–6, after starter Matt Boyd yielded 7 earned runs without recording an out.

Travelling to Detroit for the first time in 2015, the Blue Jays were no-hit into the eighth inning by Aníbal Sánchez. Their late rally fell short, losing the opener 8–6. In the second game, R. A. Dickey took his team-leading ninth loss on the season, as Toronto was defeated 8–3. The team managed to avoid a sweep, beating Detroit 10–5 in the final game of the 3-game series. Following the game, it was announced that Josh Donaldson had been elected to the 2015 Major League Baseball All-Star Game as the starting third baseman. The Blue Jays then took on the White Sox in Chicago, with Mark Buehrle starting the first game of the series. Though the Jays would end Chris Sale's streak of games with at least 10 strikeouts, they would lose 4–2 following a costly error by Jose Reyes. After the game, Jose Bautista and Russell Martin were announced as reserve All-Stars. In the second game, Félix Doubront made his first start as a Blue Jay, allowing just 1 run in 6 2/3 innings as Toronto won, 2–1. Toronto would lose the third game, 7–6, after Roberto Osuna surrendered a walk-off home run in the eleventh inning. In the finale, the Jays offence was shut down by Jeff Samardzija, losing 2–0 and falling to 2–5 on their road trip. Moving on to Kansas City for their final series before the All-Star break, the Jays were shut out for the second consecutive game, losing 3–0. In the second game, Mark Buehrle earned his 10th win of the season, his 15th straight season with at least 10 wins, defeating the Royals, 6–2. In the rubber match, the Jays came back from being down 7–0, scoring 8 runs in the sixth inning to take the lead; however, poor pitching would again befall them, losing 11–10, and ending the unofficial first half of the season with a 45–46 record.

While both Donaldson and Martin participated in All-Star festivities, Jose Bautista declined the invitation in order to get treatment on his sore shoulder. Donaldson competed in the Home Run Derby, losing to eventual winner Todd Frazier in the semi-finals. After the break, the Blue Jays returned to Toronto to play three games against the Rays. Drew Hutchison continued to perform well at home, while Donaldson and Justin Smoak homered to lead the Jays back to .500 with a 6–2 win. They would lose the second game of the series, 3–2, continuing to struggle scoring runs for R. A. Dickey. Taking on Chris Archer in the finale for the fourth time this season, the Jays would win 4–0, off another strong start by Marco Estrada.

Toronto began a 6-game trip to the west coast in Oakland, taking on the Athletics for the first time since the trade that made Josh Donaldson a Blue Jay. Mark Buehrle would earn his team-leading eleventh win of the season in the first game of the series, defeating former Blue Jay Kendall Graveman 7–1. The second game went into extra innings, where Roberto Osuna allowed a walk-off home run in the tenth innings and took the loss, 4–3. The Jays would win the rubber match 5–2, aided by Oakland trading scheduled starter Scott Kazmir prior to the game. The team then travelled to Seattle for a 3-game series against the Mariners. The Toronto offence was shut down by Felix Hernandez in the first game, losing 5–2. Drew Hutchison was the scheduled starter for Toronto, but was scratched before the game due to illness. Aaron Sanchez was activated off the disabled list before the second game of the series, and as expected was moved to the bullpen. He would end up taking the win, 8–6, thanks to a ninth-inning, 2-run single by Chris Colabello. The Blue Jays would lose the final game of their 6-game road trip, 6–5, after Aaron Loup yielded a walk-off home run in the 10th inning.

In the early hours of July 28, Toronto pulled off a blockbuster trade with Colorado, sending José Reyes, Miguel Castro, Jeff Hoffman, and Jesus Tinoco to the Rockies in exchange for Troy Tulowitzki and LaTroy Hawkins. That night, the team began a 10-game homestand with 2 games against the Philadelphia Phillies. The Blue Jays would lose the game, 3–2, with Hawkins making his debut for the team, pitching 1 relief inning. Jose Bautista and Devon Travis would leave the game with a cramp and a shoulder injury, respectively. Tulowitzki would make his Blue Jays' debut in the second game of the series, batting leadoff for the first time in his career. He would finish the game 3–5, with a home run, 2 doubles, and 3 RBI. Toronto would win 8–2 and split the series with Philadelphia. Before the start of their game on July 30, the first of a 4-game series with the Royals, the Blue Jays announced the acquisition of David Price. Toronto traded their top prospect, Daniel Norris, as well as Matt Boyd and Jairo Labourt to the Detroit Tigers for Price. The team would win their game against Kansas City that night, 5–2, aided by 3 home runs. The Jays would then trade for Mark Lowe and Ben Revere before the trade deadline passed, and won their final game of July, beating Kansas City 7–6 in the eleventh inning.

=== August ===
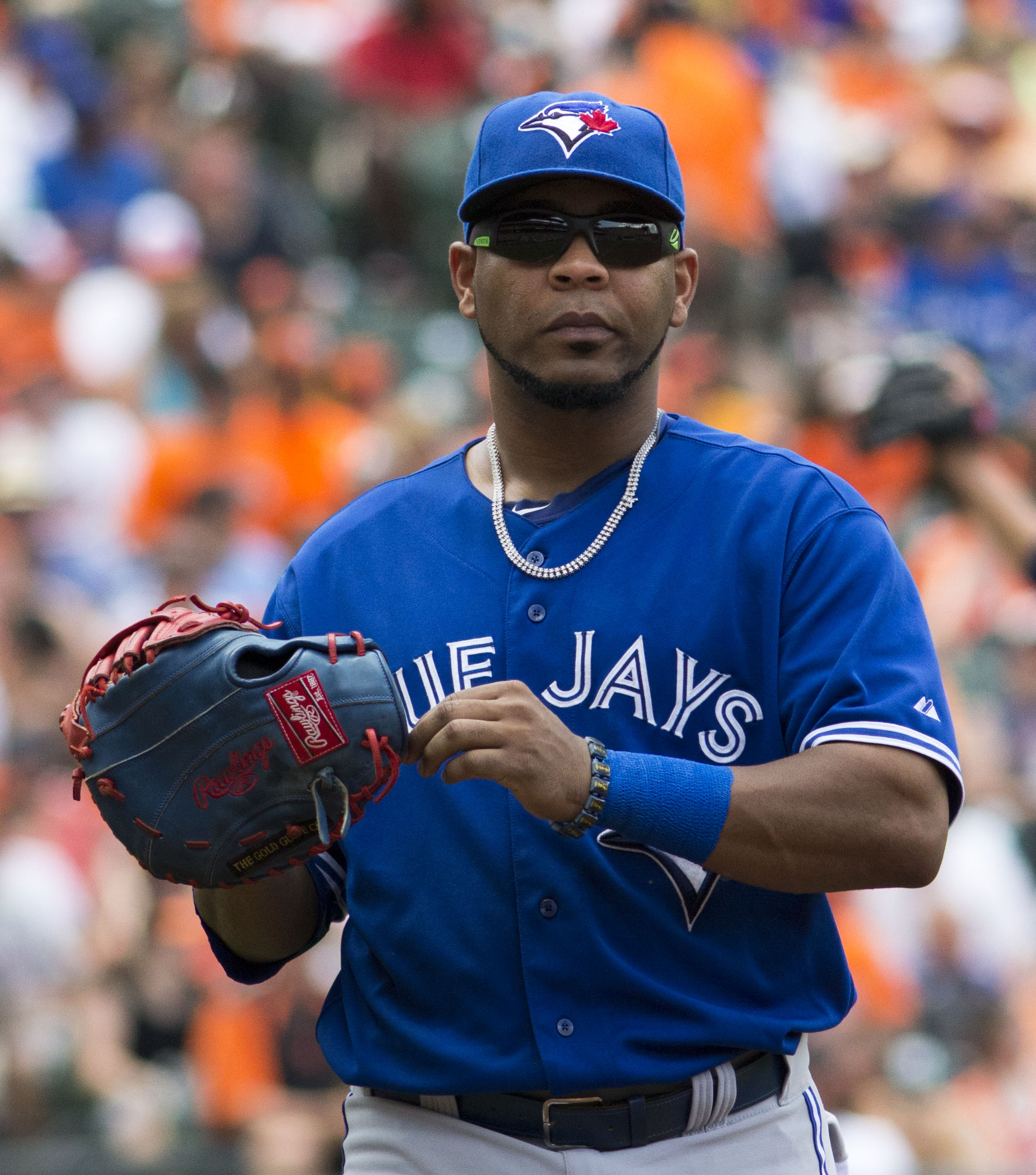
Edwin Encarnación tied the Blue Jays franchise record for grand slams in a single season, with 3, as well as RBI in a single game, with 9, on August 29.

The Blue Jays opened August with a 7–6 loss to the Royals. Ben Revere and Mark Lowe made their debuts with Toronto, with the latter allowing 3 runs in 1 inning pitched to take the loss. To close out the series, the Blue Jays and Royals played a heated game on August 2. Royals starter Edinson Vólquez intentionally hit Josh Donaldson with a pitch in the first inning, and both benches were warned by home plate umpire Jim Wolf. In his next at-bat, Volquez narrowly missed hitting Donaldson in the head, but was not ejected. Later, Troy Tulowitzki was hit by Royals reliever Ryan Madson, who followed with another pitch that just missed hitting Donaldson in the face. Manager John Gibbons was ejected for arguing with Wolf, while Madson remained in the game. In the following inning, Aaron Sanchez hit Alcides Escobar on the knee with an inside pitch and was ejected, which lead to a bench-clearing argument on field, with Blue Jays bench coach DeMarlo Hale also being ejected. The Blue Jays would win the game, 5–2, taking 3 of 4 from the AL-leading Royals.

Toronto followed their series victory over the Royals with a 4-game set against the Minnesota Twins, who entered the series with a 1-game lead for the second Wild Card position. Newly acquired ace David Price made his first start for Toronto and lead them to a 5–1 victory, pitching 8 innings and striking out 11, which tied a franchise record for strikeouts in a Blue Jays debut. Before the game on August 4, it was announced that John Gibbons had been suspended 1 game for returning to the field on August 2 after being ejected. Aaron Sanchez was suspended 3 games, as MLB determined he had intentionally hit Alcides Escobar with a pitch. The Blue Jays would take sole possession of the second Wild Card spot with a 3–1 win that night, aided by another strong start from Marco Estrada. In the third game of the series, Jose Bautista hit his 5th career grand slam to lift Toronto to a 9–7 victory. Before the game, it was announced that Marcus Stroman, who had been expected to miss the entire 2015 season with a torn ACL, would begin a rehab assignment on August 21. The Blue Jays would complete the first 4-game sweep of the Twins in franchise history on August 6, winning 9–3. Mark Buehrle earned his 30th career win against Minnesota in the game, while Edwin Encarnacion hit his 250th career home run.

Travelling to New York for the first time since their season-opening series, the Blue Jays took on the Yankees in a crucial 3-game set. Toronto entered the series just 4 1/2 back of the Yankees for the division lead. The first game went tied into extra innings, where Jose Bautista hit a solo home run to give the Blue Jays a 2–1 lead. Roberto Osuna closed the game for his ninth save of the season, and in doing so became the youngest pitcher in MLB history to record an extra-innings save. David Price made his second start as a Blue Jay in the middle game of the series, and held the Yankees scoreless through 7 innings. Justin Smoak hit the first grand slam of his career, as well as the first Blue Jays grand slam at Yankees Stadium (past or present). In the finale, the Blue Jays completed their second-consecutive sweep, defeating the Yankees 2–0. The sweep was Toronto's first in New York since May 22–25, 2003, and the Yankees were shutout in back-to-back games for the first time since May 12–13, 1999, ending an MLB record streak of 2,665 games. On their August 10 off-day, Josh Donaldson and David Price were named American League Co-Players of the Week.

Returning home, Toronto sought to extend their 8-game winning streak against the Oakland Athletics. Drew Hutchison pitched into the eighth inning for the first time since May, as the Blue Jays won, 4–2. Toronto's offence exploded once again in the second game, scoring 7 runs in the second inning and winning 10–3, making them the first team since the 1977 Kansas City Royals to have 2 10-game winning streaks in a season. The Blue Jays also took a half-game lead on the Yankees in the AL East with the win. In the finale, Athletics starter Sonny Gray was scratched due to back spasms, and former Blue Jay Jesse Chavez started in his place. Mark Buehrle pitched another gem, allowing 2 runs in 7 innings of work to lead Toronto to a 4–2 victory. The win made the 2015 Blue Jays the first team to have 2 11-game winning streaks since the 1954 Cleveland Indians. Looking to extend their winning streak to a franchise-record 12 games, the Blue Jays played against the Yankees for 3 games, this time in Toronto. David Price pitched well through 7 innings, before leaving in the eighth with 2 baserunners. Aaron Sanchez would give up a three-run home run to Carlos Beltrán, and New York would hang on to beat the Jays 4–3, ending their streak, and knocking Toronto out of first place in the AL East. In the middle game of the series, the Blue Jays were shut down by Yankees ace Masahiro Tanaka, who pitched a complete game and gave up only 1 run. The Blue Jays avoided the sweep, taking the series finale by a score of 3–1.

Due to several off-days in the second half of August, the Blue Jays did not need a fifth starter, and on their off day on August 17, Opening Day starter Drew Hutchison was optioned to Triple-A Buffalo. The team would travel to Philadelphia for a 2-game series with the Phillies. Josh Donaldson drove in 4 runs in the first game, giving him the league-lead with 91, and aid the Jays to an 8–5 victory. The Phillies would take game 2, 7–4, and split the series. Following another off-day, the Blue Jays took on the Los Angeles Angels of Anaheim. The matchup saw the two leading American League MVP hopefuls, Angels center fielder Mike Trout and Blue Jays third baseman Josh Donaldson, go head-to-head. David Price earned his third win in four starts with the Blue Jays, as the offence powered to a 9–2 win. Donaldson would go 2–3 with 2 doubles and 3 RBI, while Trout was hitless in 3 at-bats. In the second game, the Blue Jays offence exploded once again, defeating the Angels 15–3. Donaldson had a career-best performance, going 4–5 with a home run and 6 RBI, giving him a career-high 100 RBI on the season, as well as making him the first player in 2015 to have 100 or more RBI. Trout was 0–3 with 2 strikeouts in the game. In the final game of the series, the Blue Jays came back from a 5–1 deficit after the first inning to win 12–5. Toronto's offence set new franchise records for hits and runs scored in a three-game series, with 48 and 36 respectively, and moved back into first place in the AL East by a half game.

Seeking to extend their lead over the Yankees, the Blue Jays would travel to Texas to take on the Rangers for 3 games. Down 5–4 with 2 outs in the ninth inning of the first game, the Jays would rally to take the lead and win, 6–5. In the second game, Toronto's offence would score more than 10 runs in a game for the franchise-record 20th time in 2015, defeating Texas 12–4 and extending their winning streak to 5 games. The Blue Jays would be denied their second-consecutive road sweep, losing the finale 4–1. Returning home after a 6–2 road trip, the Blue Jays took on the Detroit Tigers. Former Blue Jay Matt Boyd started the first game for Detroit and took the loss, yielding 3 home runs to Toronto's potent offence. Roberto Osuna would earn his 10th save of the month in the 5–3 victory. In the middle game of the series, Edwin Encarnación had a career-best day, falling just a solo home run short of the elusive home run cycle. Encarnación's 9 RBI tied the franchise record set by Roy Howell in 1977, while his third grand slam of the season tied the mark set by Carlos Delgado (1997) and Darrin Fletcher (2000). Toronto would win the game 15–1. The Blue Jays would complete the sweep on August 30, their ninth sweep of the season, winning 9–2. Encarnación recorded his 35th RBI of August, establishing a new franchise record.

On August 31, the Blue Jays organization announced that Mark Shapiro, president of the Cleveland Indians, would succeed Paul Beeston as president and CEO of the Jays at the end of the 2015 season. Toronto ended August with a 4–2 loss to the Cleveland Indians.

=== September / October ===
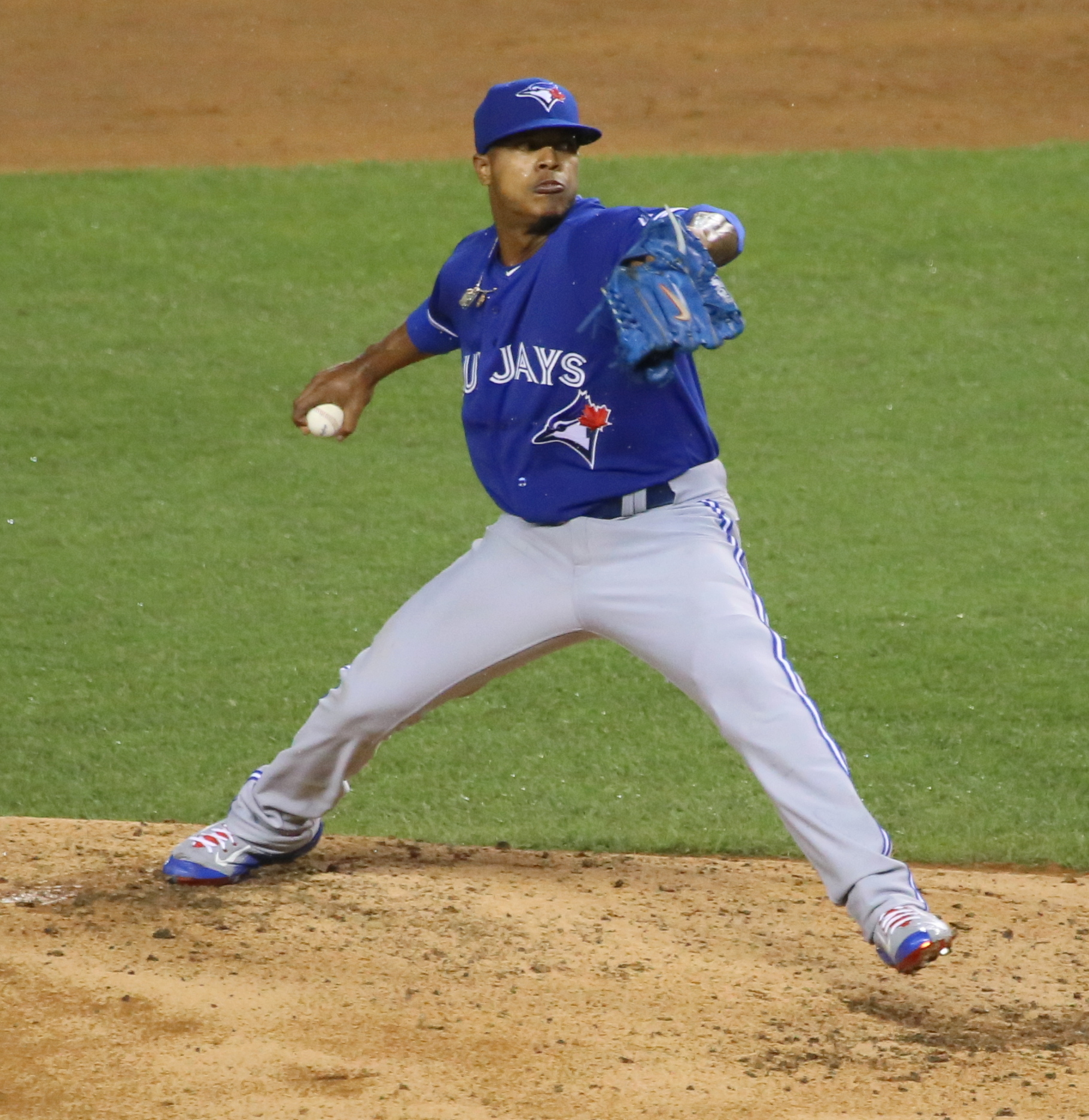
Marcus Stroman made his 2015 debut on September 12, just six months after tearing his ACL.

The Blue Jays opened September with a 5–3 win over Cleveland, after Ryan Goins hit a walk-off two-run home run in the tenth inning. In the rubber match, R. A. Dickey threw his second complete game of the season, and levelled his record at 10–10 by holding Cleveland to just one run on four hits. Marcus Stroman made his first rehab start with the Lansing Lugnuts, throwing 4 2/3 innings before reaching his pitch limit. He did not allow a hit, walked one, and struck out seven. After an off-day, the Blue Jays took on the Orioles in a three-game series. Drew Hutchison pitched in the series opener, and allowed two home runs to Chris Davis, who took the MLB lead with forty. Toronto would lose the game, 10–2. David Price took the ball in the second game, and earned his 100th career win, leading the Jays to a 5–1 victory. In the final game of the series, the Blue Jays would win their fifth-consecutive series by defeating Baltimore 10–4, and moved twenty games above .500.

Looking to distance themselves from the Yankees, the Blue Jays travelled to Boston for the final time in the 2015 season to battle the last-place Red Sox. Mark Buehrle, who had been pushed back two days due to fatigue, lasted only 3 1/3 innings as the Blue Jays fell to the Red Sox 11–4 in game 1, and saw their lead over New York shrink to just a half-game. The second game of the series went into extra innings, tied 1–1, before the Toronto offence scored four runs in the top of the tenth inning to win 5–1. As the Yankees lost that day, the Blue Jays regained a 1 1/2 game lead in the division. The Jays were unable to take the series, however, as in the final game they were defeated 10–4. New York also lost, so the Toronto lead remained 1 1/2 games. The Blue Jays would then head to New York for a four-game series, one which many analysts dubbed the most important of the year for Toronto. The first game was postponed due to rain, and a doubleheader was scheduled for September 12. David Price pitched in the opener and earned his sixth win with the Jays, defeating the Yankees 11–5. In the first game of the doubleheader, the Blue Jays won 9–5 in the eleventh inning, and guaranteed that they would leave New York leading the AL East. However, they lost shortstop Troy Tulowitzki to a cracked shoulder blade following a collision with center fielder Kevin Pillar. The second game of the doubleheader would see the return of Marcus Stroman, who pitched five innings and allowed 3 runs before being removed from the game due to a 33-minute rain delay. The Blue Jays led 6–3 at the time of the delay, and would go on to win the game 10–7, taking a 4 1/2 game lead over New York. Before the final game of the series, Alex Anthopouos announced that Tulowitzki would miss 2–3 weeks with the injury. Toronto would again be shut down by Yankees' starter Masahiro Tanaka, losing 5–0. Edwin Encarnacion did not play in the game due to a finger injury, but was not expected to miss additional time. The Blue Jays had an off-day following their series in New York, and travelled to Atlanta to take on the Braves in their final regular season series outside of the AL East. Mark Buehrle made his return to the rotation after leaving to get a cortisone shot in his left shoulder, but the Blue Jays would lose the first game of the series, 3–2. David Price would start the second game of the series and earn his 7th win as a Blue Jay, pitching 7 innings and beating the Braves 9–1. In the final game of the series, the Blue Jays would shutout the Braves, 5–0. Marco Estrada allowed just 3 hits and 2 walks against Atlanta, while Edwin Encarnacion, Josh Donaldson, and Cliff Pennington hit home runs for Toronto, ending their 10-game road trip with a 6–4 record and a 3 1/2-game lead for the AL East.

Returning home for their final home series of the regular season, the Blue Jays battled the Red Sox for 3 games. Marcus Stroman made his first home start in 2015, holding the Red Sox to 1 run over 7 innings in the first game, which Toronto won 6–1. The win gave Toronto a 4 1/2-game lead in their division, however they would give that game back the following day, losing 7–6 to Boston, coupled with the Yankees defeating the Mets. The Blue Jays led the game 4–2, heading into the ninth inning, however Roberto Osuna and Aaron Sanchez would combine to give up 5 runs to the Red Sox. In the bottom of the ninth, Jose Bautista hit a 2-run home run, however the comeback would fall short. The Blue Jays would lose another game off their division lead in the rubber match, losing 4–3 to Boston after committing 3 errors. Following their series loss to Boston, the Blue Jays faced the Yankees for the final time in the 2015 regular season. Toronto would take the first game, 4–2, after another quality start from David Price. Losing 3–2 in the ninth inning of the second game, Dioner Navarro hit a solo home run to tie the game. The Blue Jays would load the bases later in the inning, but were unable to score the winning run. In the top of the tenth, the Yankees scored 3 runs off a home run by Greg Bird, and the Blue Jays would go on to lose the game 6–4. In the final game, Toronto and New York battled to a scoreless tie through the first 5 innings. In the bottom of the sixth, Kevin Pillar broke the tie with an RBI single, and the Blue Jays took a 1–0 lead. In the seventh, Russell Martin hit a 3-run home run to lead Toronto to a 4–0 victory. Marcus Stroman earned his third win in as many starts, pitching 7 shutout innings against the Yankees and lowering his ERA to 1.89. Toronto's last 3 regular season home games would be played against the Rays. R. A. Dickey started the first game of the series and earned his 100th career win, 5–3 over Tampa Bay. The win also clinched a postseason berth for the Blue Jays, their first since the 1993 season. The second game featured a match between former Rays ace David Price and current ace Chris Archer, who was mentored by Price early in his career. Though many had thought the game would be a pitcher's duel, the two combined to allow 14 runs through the first 4 innings, with Toronto eventually coming out on top, 10–8. The Blue Jays would complete the sweep, winning the final game of the series 5–4 thanks to Josh Donaldson's franchise record third walk-off home run of the season.

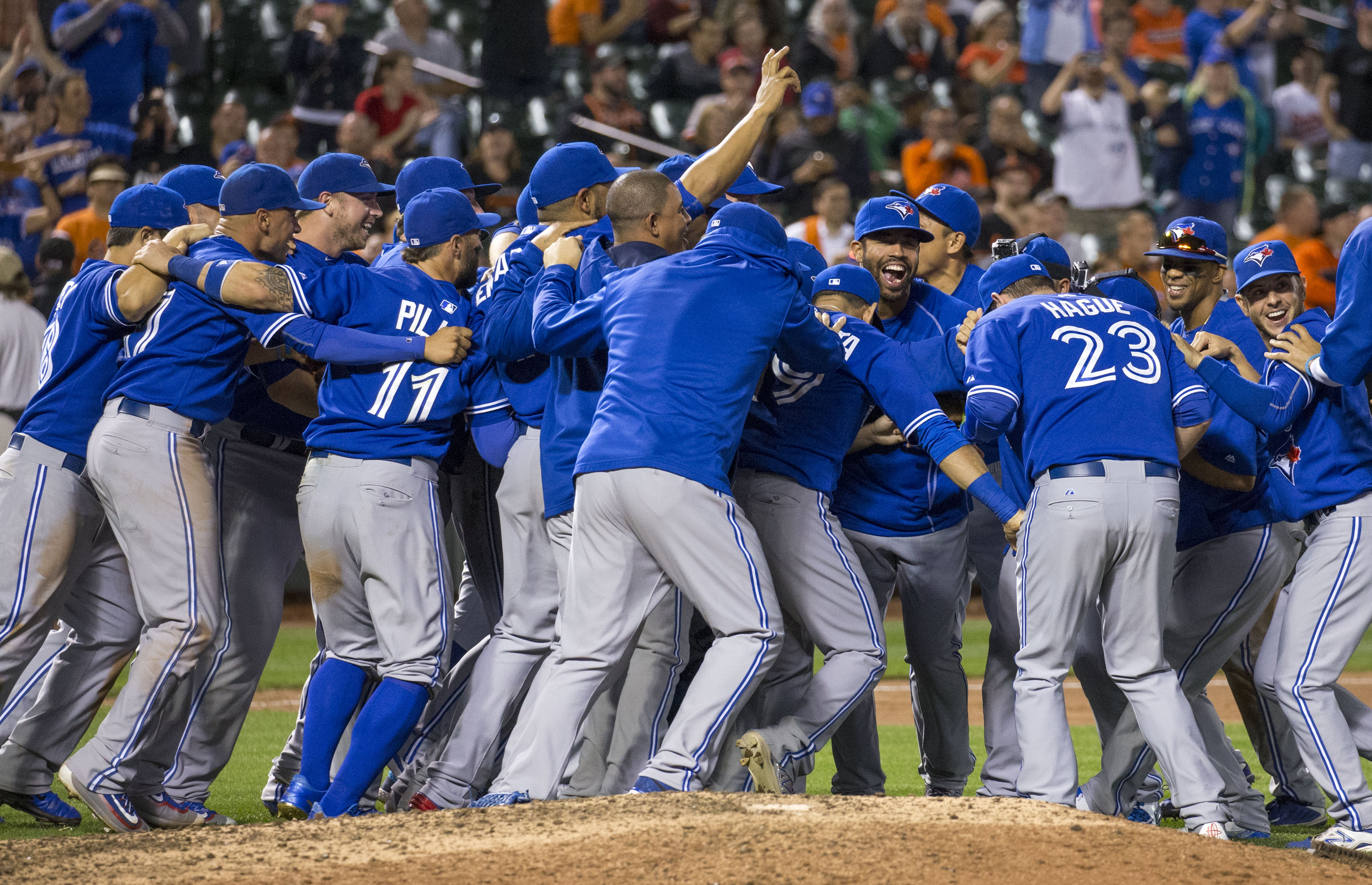
The Blue Jays celebrate after clinching the American League East

The Blue Jays, still looking to clinch the division, travelled to Baltimore for a 4-game series. Behind 3–1 in the first game, Toronto rallied and tied the game in the eighth inning, before taking the lead in the ninth and holding on to win 4–3. The win lowered the team's magic number to 2. The second game of the series was rained out, and rescheduled for a doubleheader the following day. While the Blue Jays were idle due to the rain out, the Yankees lost to the Red Sox, and the magic number was lowered to 1. The Blue Jays would clinch the division by winning the first game of the doubleheader, 15–2. The starters were rested in the second game of the doubleheader, as well as in the final game of the series. Toronto lost both games, 8–1 and 6–4. Still in contention for the best record and home field advantage throughout the playoffs, the Blue Jays played their final three regular season games in Tampa Bay against the Rays. Troy Tulowitzki returned to the lineup in the first game of the series, recording 2 hits as Toronto defeated Tampa 8–4. Roberto Osuna would take the blown save and loss in the second game, as the Rays rallied in the ninth inning to win 4–3. Mark Buehrle was given the start in the final game of the season, despite having started just two days prior, and entered the game just 2 innings short of reaching 200 for the 15th consecutive season. Unfortunately, Buehrle was not able to get out of the first inning, ending his streak as the Jays lost the game 12–3. The loss ensured that Kansas City would finish with the best record in the American League, and that the Blue Jays would play the Texas Rangers in the American League Division Series.

On October 29, 2015, General Manager Alex Anthopoulos reported that he would not be returning to the team next year, but has not provided a reason for his decision.

=== Game log ===
Legend
Blue Jays win	Blue Jays loss	Game postponed

2015 Game log
April: 11–12 (Home: 5–5; Road: 6–7)

#	Date	Opponent	Score	Win	Loss	Save	Attendance	Record	GB
1	April 6	@ Yankees	6–1	Hutchison (1–0)	Tanaka (0–1)	—	48,469	1–0	–
2	April 8	@ Yankees	3–4	Betances (1–0)	Loup (0–1)	Miller (1)	31,020	1–1	½
3	April 9	@ Yankees	6–3	Norris (1–0)	Sabathia (0–1)	Castro (1)	32,152	2–1	–
4	April 10	@ Orioles	12–5	Buehrle (1–0)	Norris (0–1)	—	45,936	3–1	–
5	April 11	@ Orioles	1–7	Jiménez (1–0)	Sanchez (0–1)	—	38,897	3–2	1
6	April 12	@ Orioles	10–7	Loup (1–1)	Tillman (1–1)	Castro (2)	32,522	4–2	–
7	April 13	Rays	1–2	Odorizzi (2–0)	Dickey (0–1)	Boxberger (3)	48,414	4–3	1
8	April 14	Rays	2–3	Geltz (1–0)	Castro (0–1)	Jepsen (1)	17,264	4–4	2
9	April 15	Rays	12–7	Buehrle (2–0)	Ramírez (0–1)	—	15,086	5–4	1
10	April 16	Rays	2–4	Archer (2–1)	Sanchez (0–2)	Boxberger (4)	14,433	5–5	1 1/2
11	April 17	Braves	7–8	Martin (1–0)	Cecil (0–1)	Grilli (5)	21,397	5–6	2 1/2
12	April 18	Braves	6–5 (10)	Cecil (1–1)	Marimón (0–1)	—	34,743	6–6	1 1/2
13	April 19	Braves	2–5	Miller (2–0)	Norris (1–1)	Grilli (6)	44,794	6–7	1 1/2
14	April 21	Orioles	13–6	Buehrle (3–0)	Norris (0–2)	—	14,184	7–7	2
15	April 22	Orioles	4–2	Sanchez (1–2)	Jiménez (1–1)	Castro (3)	15,606	8–7	1
16	April 23	Orioles	7–6	Hutchison (2–0)	Tillman (2–2)	Castro (4)	18,581	9–7	–
17	April 24	@ Rays	3–12	Dominguez (1–0)	Dickey (0–2)	Andriese (1)	11,897	9–8	1
18	April 25	@ Rays	2–4	Frieri (1–0)	Cecil (1–2)	Boxberger (5)	19,772	9–9	1
19	April 26	@ Rays	1–5	Archer (3–2)	Buehrle (3–1)	—	21,107	9–10	2
20	April 27	@ Red Sox	5–6	Uehara (2–1)	Castro (0–2)	—	34,739	9–11	3
21	April 28	@ Red Sox	11–8	Estrada (1–0)	Buchholz (1–3)	Cecil (1)	33,920	10–11	3
22	April 29	@ Red Sox	1–4	Porcello (2–2)	Dickey (0–3)	Uehara (4)	34,220	10–12	3
23	April 30	@ Indians	5–1	Francis (1–0)	House (0–4)	—	9,798	11–12	2 1/2

May: 12–17 (Home: 9–7; Road: 3–10)

#	Date	Opponent	Score	Win	Loss	Save	Attendance	Record	GB
24	May 1	@ Indians	4–9	Carrasco (3–2)	Buehrle (3–2)	—	15,088	11–13	3 1/2
25	May 2	@ Indians	11–4	Sanchez (2–2)	Kluber (0–4)	—	18,008	12–13	3 1/2
26	May 3	@ Indians	7–10	Rzepczynski (1–0)	Francis (1–1)	—	16,128	12–14	4 1/2
27	May 4	Yankees	3–1	Dickey (1–3)	Martin (0–1)	Cecil (2)	19,217	13–14	3 1/2
28	May 5	Yankees	3–6	Pineda (4–0)	Estrada (1–1)	Miller (11)	21,519	13–15	4 1/2
29	May 6	Yankees	5–1	Buehrle (4–2)	Sabathia (0–5)	—	21,312	14–15	3 1/2
30	May 8	Red Sox	7–0	Sanchez (3–2)	Miley (1–4)	—	30,430	15–15	4
31	May 9	Red Sox	7–1	Hutchison (3–0)	Kelly (1–2)	—	42,917	16–15	3
32	May 10	Red Sox	3–6	Buchholz (2–4)	Dickey (1–4)	Uehara (6)	42,419	16–16	4
33	May 11	@ Orioles	2–5	Jiménez (3–2)	Estrada (1–2)	Britton (7)	20,468	16–17	5
34	May 12	@ Orioles	10–2	Buehrle (5–2)	Tillman (2–5)	—	17,319	17–17	4
35	May 13	@ Orioles	1–6	González (4–2)	Sanchez (3–3)	O'Day (1)	24,654	17–18	4
36	May 14	@ Astros	4–6	Fields (2–0)	Loup (1–2)	Qualls (4)	15,777	17–19	4
37	May 15	@ Astros	4–8	Keuchel (5–0)	Dickey (1–5)	—	21,653	17–20	4
38	May 16	@ Astros	5–6	Feldman (3–4)	Francis (1–2)	Gregerson (9)	27,102	17–21	5
39	May 17	@ Astros	2–4	McHugh (5–1)	Buehrle (5–3)	Gregerson (10)	25,307	17–22	5
40	May 18	Angels	10–6	Osuna (1–0)	Morin (1–1)	—	29,306	18–22	4 1/2
41	May 19	Angels	2–3	Santiago (3–2)	Sanchez (3–4)	Street (13)	15,062	18–23	4 1/2
42	May 20	Angels	3–4	Weaver (3–4)	Hutchison (3–1)	Street (14)	16,402	18–24	4 1/2
43	May 21	Angels	8–4	Dickey (2–5)	Shoemaker (3–4)	—	19,014	19–24	4 1/2
44	May 22	Mariners	3–4	Hernández (7–1)	Estrada (1–3)	Rodney (11)	21,195	19–25	5 1/2
45	May 23	Mariners	2–3	Paxton (3–2)	Buehrle (5–4)	Rodney (12)	33,086	19–26	5 1/2
46	May 24	Mariners	8–2	Sanchez (4–4)	Walker (1–5)	—	37,929	20–26	4 1/2
47	May 25	White Sox	6–0	Hutchison (4–1)	Noesí (0–4)	—	15,168	21–26	3 1/2
48	May 26	White Sox	10–9	Delabar (1–0)	Robertson (3–1)	—	17,276	22–26	3
49	May 27	White Sox	3–5 (10)	Robertson (4–1)	Osuna (1–1)	—	15,463	22–27	4
50	May 29	@ Twins	6–4	Buehrle (6–4)	Perkins (0–1)	—	24,509	23–27	2 1/2
51	May 30	@ Twins	2–3	Pressly (2–1)	Loup (1–3)	Boyer (1)	32,076	23–28	3 1/2
52	May 31	@ Twins	5–6	Pressly (3–1)	Osuna (1–2)	Perkins (19)	33,829	23–29	3 1/2

June: 18–9 (Home: 11–5; Road: 7–4)

#	Date	Opponent	Score	Win	Loss.	Save	Attendance	Record	GB
–	June 1	@ Nationals	Postponed (rain). Makeup date: June 2.						
53	June 2	@ Nationals	0–2	Zimmermann (5–2)	Dickey (2–6)	Storen (17)	23,192	23–30	4
54	June 2	@ Nationals	7–3	Estrada (2–3)	Scherzer (6–4)	—	25,765	24–30	4 1/2
55	June 3	@ Nationals	8–0	Buehrle (7–4)	Jordan (0–2)	—	33,654	25–30	4 1/2
56	June 5	Astros	6–2	Sanchez (5–4)	Hernández (2–5)	—	22,971	26–30	4 1/2
57	June 6	Astros	7–2	Hutchison (5–1)	Oberholtzer (0–1)	—	31,809	27–30	4 1/2
58	June 7	Astros	7–6	Hendriks (1–0)	Gregerson (2–1)	—	35,571	28–30	4 1/2
59	June 8	Marlins	11–3	Estrada (3–3)	Hand (1–2)	—	17,582	29–30	4
60	June 9	Marlins	4–3	Hendriks (2–0)	Ramos (0–1)	—	20,558	30–30	4
61	June 10	Marlins	7–2	Copeland (1–0)	Koehler (4–4)	—	44,106	31–30	3
62	June 12	@ Red Sox	13–10	Delabar (2–0)	Tazawa (0–2)	Cecil (3)	37,575	32–30	2
63	June 13	@ Red Sox	5–4 (11)	Loup (2–3)	Barnes (2–2)	Cecil (4)	37,158	33–30	1
64	June 14	@ Red Sox	13–5	Estrada (4–3)	Rodríguez (2–1)	—	36,296	34–30	1
65	June 15	@ Mets	3–4 (11)	Robles (1–1)	Cecil (1–3)	—	22,172	34–31	2
66	June 16	@ Mets	2–3	Harvey (7–4)	Copeland (1–1)	Parnell (1)	24,522	34–32	2
67	June 17	Mets	8–0	Hutchison (6–1)	Niese (3–7)	—	28,906	35–32	2
68	June 18	Mets	7–1	Dickey (3–6)	Colón (9–5)	—	27,588	36–32	2
69	June 19	Orioles	5–4	Estrada (5–3)	Wright (2–3)	Cecil (5)	32,322	37–32	2
70	June 20	Orioles	3–5	O'Day (3–0)	Loup (2–4)	Britton (19)	46,018	37–33	3
71	June 21	Orioles	9–13	O'Day (4–0)	Cecil (1–4)	—	46,092	37–34	3
72	June 22	@ Rays	8–5	Hutchison (7–1)	Andriese (2–2)	Osuna (1)	10,324	38–34	2
73	June 23	@ Rays	3–4	Archer (9–4)	Dickey (3–7)	Boxberger (19)	11,474	38–35	3
74	June 24	@ Rays	1–0 (12)	Cecil (2–4)	Gomes (1–3)	Delabar (1)	18,469	39–35	2
75	June 26	Rangers	12–2	Buehrle (8–4)	Martinez (5–4)	—	25,821	40–35	1
76	June 27	Rangers	0–4	Gallardo (7–6)	Boyd (0–1)	—	37,167	40–36	2
77	June 28	Rangers	3–2	Hutchison (8–1)	Gonzalez (2–3)	Osuna (2)	42,376	41–36	1
78	June 29	Red Sox	1–3	Buchholz (6–6)	Dickey (3–8)	Uehara (17)	27,107	41–37	1
79	June 30	Red Sox	3–4	Rodríguez (4–2)	Estrada (5–4)	Uehara (18)	28,942	41–38	1

July: 12–13 (Home: 6–3; Road: 6–10)

#	Date	Opponent	Score	Win	Loss	Save	Attendance	Record	GB
80	July 1	Red Sox	11–2	Buehrle (9–4)	Porcello (4–9)	—	45,392	42–38	1
81	July 2	Red Sox	6–12	Miley (8–7)	Boyd (0–2)	—	29,758	42–39	1
82	July 3	@ Tigers	6–8	Sánchez (7–7)	Hutchison (8–2)	Soria (18)	39,367	42–40	2
83	July 4	@ Tigers	3–8	Price (8–2)	Dickey (3–9)	—	37,214	42–41	3
84	July 5	@ Tigers	10–5	Estrada (6–4)	Verlander (0–2)	Osuna (3)	35,102	43–41	2
85	July 6	@ White Sox	2–4	Sale (7–4)	Buehrle (9–5)	—	24,593	43–42	2 1/2
86	July 7	@ White Sox	2–1	Doubront (1–0)	Quintana (4–8)	Osuna (4)	17,028	44–42	1 1/2
87	July 8	@ White Sox	6–7 (11)	Putnam (3–3)	Osuna (1–3)	—	17,032	44–43	2 1/2
88	July 9	@ White Sox	0–2	Samardzija (6–4)	Dickey (3–10)	—	23,298	44–44	3 1/2
89	July 10	@ Royals	0–3	Duffy (3–4)	Estrada (6–5)	Holland (18)	31,558	44–45	4 1/2
90	July 11	@ Royals	6–2	Buehrle (10–5)	Young (7–5)	—	30,790	45–45	3 1/2
91	July 12	@ Royals	10–11	Davis (5–1)	Schultz (0–1)	Holland (19)	31,962	45–46	4 1/2
92	July 17	Rays	6–2	Hutchison (9–2)	Odorizzi (5–6)	—	32,908	46–46	4 1/2
93	July 18	Rays	2–3	Jepsen (2–5)	Tepera (0–1)	McGee (4)	41,583	46–47	4 1/2
94	July 19	Rays	4–0	Estrada (7–5)	Archer (9–7)	—	41,683	47–47	4 1/2
95	July 21	@ Athletics	7–1	Buehrle (11–5)	Graveman (6–6)	—	19,364	48–47	4 1/2
96	July 22	@ Athletics	3–4 (10)	Rodriguez (1–1)	Osuna (1–4)	—	18,827	48–48	5 1/2
97	July 23	@ Athletics	5–2	Dickey (4–10)	Otero (2–4)	Schultz (1)	19,045	49–48	5 1/2
98	July 24	@ Mariners	2–5	Hernández (12–5)	Estrada (7–6)	Smith (9)	43,328	49–49	5 1/2
99	July 25	@ Mariners	8–6	Sanchez (6–4)	Smith (1–3)	Osuna (5)	45,027	50–49	5 1/2
100	July 26	@ Mariners	5–6 (10)	Beimel (2–1)	Loup (2–5)	—	35,159	50–50	6 1/2
101	July 28	Phillies	2–3	Morgan (2–2)	Doubront (1–1)	Giles (1)	30,516	50–51	8
102	July 29	Phillies	8–2	Dickey (5–10)	Williams (3–8)	—	27,060	51–51	7
103	July 30	Royals	5–2	Estrada (8–6)	Duffy (4–5)	Osuna (6)	30,057	52–51	6
104	July 31	Royals	7–6 (11)	Hendriks (3–0)	Morales (3–1)	—	29,389	53–51	6

August: 21–6 (Home: 12–4; Road: 9–2)

#	Date	Opponent	Score	Win	Loss	Save	Attendance	Record	GB
105	August 1	Royals	6–7	Ventura (6–7)	Lowe (0–2) (Note: 0–1 with Toronto)	Holland (23)	37,932	53–52	6
106	August 2	Royals	5–2	Dickey (6–10)	Vólquez (10–6)	Osuna (7)	45,736	54–52	6
107	August 3	Twins	5–1	Price (10–4) (Note: 1–0 with Toronto)	Santana (2–2)	—	45,766	55–52	5 1/2
108	August 4	Twins	3–1	Estrada (9–6)	Hughes (10–7)	Osuna (8)	26,504	56–52	5 1/2
109	August 5	Twins	9–7	Hutchison (10–2)	Duffey (0–1)	Hawkins (3) (Note: 1 save with Toronto)	27,725	57–52	4 1/2
110	August 6	Twins	9–3	Buehrle (12–5)	Gibson (8–9)	—	34,847	58–52	4 1/2
111	August 7	@ Yankees	2–1 (10)	Cecil (3–4)	Pinder (0–1)	Osuna (9)	42,839	59–52	3 1/2
112	August 8	@ Yankees	6–0	Price (11–4) (Note: 2–0 with Toronto)	Nova (4–4)	—	45,255	60–52	2 1/2
113	August 9	@ Yankees	2–0	Estrada (10–6)	Tanaka (8–5)	Osuna (10)	42,034	61–52	1 1/2
114	August 11	Athletics	4–2	Hutchison (11–2)	Graveman (6–8)	Osuna (11)	39,381	62–52	½
115	August 12	Athletics	10–3	Dickey (7–10)	Brooks (1–1)	—	44,597	63–52	+½
116	August 13	Athletics	4–2	Buehrle (13–5)	Chavez (6–12)	Osuna (12)	46,902	64–52	+½
117	August 14	Yankees	3–4	Nova (5–4)	Sanchez (6–5)	Miller (26)	46,689	64–53	½
118	August 15	Yankees	1–4	Tanaka (9–5)	Estrada (10–7)	—	46,630	64–54	1 1/2
119	August 16	Yankees	3–1	Hutchison (12–2)	Severino (0–2)	Osuna (13)	46,792	65–54	½
120	August 18	@ Phillies	8–5	Hendriks (4–0)	Gómez (1–3)	Osuna (14)	26,547	66–54	1
121	August 19	@ Phillies	4–7	Morgan (4–4)	Buehrle (13–6)	Giles (8)	26,246	66–55	2
122	August 21	@ Angels	9–2	Price (12–4) (Note: 3–0 with Toronto)	Santiago (7–7)	—	41,110	67–55	½
123	August 22	@ Angels	15–3	Estrada (11–7)	Heaney (5–2)	—	42,578	68–55	½
124	August 23	@ Angels	12–5	Dickey (8–10)	Richards (12–10)	—	37,060	69–55	+½
125	August 25	@ Rangers	6–5	Hawkins (3–1) (Note: 1–0 with Toronto)	Tolleson (5–3)	Osuna (15)	22,227	70–55	+1
126	August 26	@ Rangers	12–4	Price (13–4) (Note: 4–0 with Toronto)	Lewis (14–6)	—	20,572	71–55	+2
127	August 27	@ Rangers	1–4	Gallardo (11–9)	Estrada (11–8)	Tolleson (26)	17,884	71–56	+1 1/2
128	August 28	Tigers	5–3	Dickey (9–10)	Boyd (1–5)	Osuna (16)	46,518	72–56	+1 1/2
129	August 29	Tigers	15–1	Hutchison (13–2)	Farmer (0–3)	—	46,444	73–56	+1 1/2
130	August 30	Tigers	9–2	Buehrle (14–6)	Simón (11–9)	—	46,625	74–56	+1 1/2
131	August 31	Indians	2–4	Salazar (12–7)	Price (13–5) (Note: 4–1 with Toronto)	Allen (28)	46,643	74–57	+1 1/2

September: 18–9 (Home: 10–4; Road: 8–5)

#	Date	Opponent	Score	Win	Loss	Save	Attendance	Record	GB
132	September 1	Indians	5–3 (10)	Lowe (1–2) (Note: 1–1 with Toronto)	Shaw (3–3)	—	41,356	75–57	+1 1/2
133	September 2	Indians	5–1	Dickey (10–10)	Bauer (10–11)	—	46,538	76–57	+1 1/2
134	September 4	Orioles	2–10	Jiménez (10–9)	Hutchison (13–3)	—	46,201	76–58	+½
135	September 5	Orioles	5–1	Price (14–5) (Note: 5–1 with Toronto)	Wright (2–4)	—	46,373	77–58	+1 1/2
136	September 6	Orioles	10–4	Estrada (12–8)	Tillman (9–11)	—	46,136	78–58	+1 1/2
137	September 7	@ Red Sox	4–11	Porcello (7–12)	Buehrle (14–7)	—	33,659	78–59	+½
138	September 8	@ Red Sox	5–1 (10)	Sanchez (7–5)	Ogando (2–1)	—	33,432	79–59	+1 1/2
139	September 9	@ Red Sox	4–10	Kelly (10–6)	Hutchison (13–4)	—	34,464	79–60	+1 1/2
–	September 10	@ Yankees	Postponed (rain). Makeup date: September 12.						
140	September 11	@ Yankees	11–5	Price (15–5) (Note: 6–1 with Toronto)	Severino (3–3)	—	40,220	80–60	+2 1/2
141	September 12	@ Yankees	9–5 (11)	Hendriks (5–0)	Mitchell (0–2)	Tepera (1)	46,278	81–60	+3 1/2
142	September 12	@ Yankees	10–7	Stroman (1–0)	Nova (6–8)	Lowe (1)	46,278	82–60	+4 1/2
143	September 13	@ Yankees	0–5	Tanaka (12–6)	Dickey (10–11)	—	39,127	82–61	+3 1/2
144	September 15	@ Braves	2–3	Vizcaíno (3–1)	Sanchez (7–6)	—	16,399	82–62	+3
145	September 16	@ Braves	9–1	Price (16–5) (Note: 7–1 with Toronto)	Miller (5–15)	—	15,178	83–62	+3
146	September 17	@ Braves	5–0	Estrada (13–8)	Wisler (5–8)	—	19,367	84–62	+3 1/2
147	September 18	Red Sox	6–1	Stroman (2–0)	Porcello (8–13)	—	47,126	85–62	+4 1/2
148	September 19	Red Sox	6–7	Layne (2–1)	Osuna (1–5)	Ross (3)	47,415	85–63	+3 1/2
149	September 20	Red Sox	3–4	Hill (1–0)	Cecil (3–5)	Ross (4)	46,743	85–64	+2 1/2
150	September 21	Yankees	4–2	Price (17–5) (Note: 8–1 with Toronto)	Warren (6–7)	Osuna (17)	47,648	86–64	+3 1/2
151	September 22	Yankees	4–6 (10)	Miller (3–2)	Lowe (1–3) (Note: 1–2 with Toronto)	—	47,992	86–65	+2 1/2
152	September 23	Yankees	4–0	Stroman (3–0)	Nova (6–9)	—	48,056	87–65	+3 1/2
153	September 25	Rays	5–3	Dickey (11–11)	Odorizzi (8–9)	Osuna (18)	47,696	88–65	+4
154	September 26	Rays	10–8	Price (18–5) (Note: 9–1 with Toronto)	Archer (12–13)	Osuna (19)	47,094	89–65	+4
155	September 27	Rays	5–4	Cecil (4–5)	Geltz (2–6)	—	47,287	90–65	+4
156	September 28	@ Orioles	4–3	Cecil (5–5)	Brach (5–3)	Osuna (20)	19,093	91–65	+5
–	September 29	@ Orioles	Postponed (rain). Makeup date: September 30.						
157	September 30	@ Orioles	15–2	Stroman (4–0)	González (9–12)	—	26,330	92–65	+6
158	September 30	@ Orioles	1–8	Gausman (4–7)	Tepera (0–2)	—	26,330	92–66	+6

October: 1–3 (Home: 0–0; Road: 1–3)

#	Date	Opponent	Score	Win	Loss	Save	Attendance	Record	GB
159	October 1	@ Orioles	4–6	McFarland (1–2)	Hutchison (13–5)	Britton (35)	18,257	92–67	+5
160	October 2	@ Rays	8–4	Buehrle (15–7)	Romero (0–2)	—	13,668	93–67	+5 1/2
161	October 3	@ Rays	3–4	Colomé (8–5)	Osuna (1–6)	—	21,963	93–68	+6
162	October 4	@ Rays	3–12	Moore (3–4)	Buehrle (15–8)	—	15,185	93–69	+6

== Postseason ==
=== American League Division Series ===
The Blue Jays, as the second seed in the American League, played against the third-seeded Texas Rangers in the ALDS. As the higher seed, the Blue Jays held home-field advantage over the Rangers, and the first two games were played in Toronto. Jays' ace David Price took on Yovani Gallardo in the first game. Price yielded five runs to the Rangers over seven innings pitched. Gallardo was only able to complete five innings, but held Toronto to two runs and the Texas bullpen was able to hold the lead from that point, winning 5–3. In the second game of the series, Rangers ace Cole Hamels squared off against Marcus Stroman, and both starters went seven innings. Stroman limited the Texas offence to three runs, while Hamels allowed four runs, through only two were earned. Brett Cecil would surrender the tying run in the 8th inning, and the game went tied 4–4 into the 14th. Texas would take the lead in the top half, scoring two runs off LaTroy Hawkins. Toronto was unable to answer in their half of the inning, and dropped the second game of the series, 6–4.

The series then moved to Texas, where Marco Estrada got the start for the Blue Jays, opposing Martín Pérez. Estrada held the opposition to one run over 6 1/3 innings, while the Blue Jays were able to score four off of Pérez through his five innings. The Blue Jays were able to add another run and avoid elimination for the first time in franchise history, winning 5–1. In the fourth game, R. A. Dickey became the oldest starting pitcher to make his postseason debut in MLB history, at almost 41 years of age. Derek Holland started for the Rangers, but gave up home runs to Josh Donaldson, Chris Colabello, and Kevin Pillar and exited after two innings, down 6–0. Dickey would be pulled after 4 2/3, and be replaced by David Price, who pitched three innings out of the bullpen. The Blue Jays would take game 4, 8–4, and force the series to game 5 back in Toronto.

As Price pitched in the fourth game, the start in game 5 went to Marcus Stroman, who opposed Cole Hamels for the second time in the ALDS. Texas got out to a 1–0 lead quickly, scoring in the first inning. In the third inning, Shin-Soo Choo hit a solo home run, giving Texas a two-run lead. The Jays responded in the bottom of the third, with Jose Bautista doubling in Ben Revere. In the sixth inning, Edwin Encarnacion hit a home run to tie the game at 2–2. In the seventh inning, controversy arose when Russell Martin attempted to throw the ball back to pitcher Aaron Sanchez. The ball hit the bat of Shin-Soo Choo, and went toward third base. Rougned Odor, who was at third base, scored the go-ahead run on the play, though initially home plate umpire Dale Scott ruled the ball dead. After a lengthy delay, which included Toronto fans throwing beer cans and plastic bottles onto the field, the call was upheld, and Texas took a 3–2 lead. Shortly afterward, Toronto manager John Gibbons informed the umpires that the team would play the rest of the game under protest. In the bottom half of the seventh inning, the Texas defence would commit three errors, which loaded the bases with no outs. After Ben Revere grounded out, Josh Donaldson tied the game with a bloop fielder's choice to right field. With runners on first and third and two outs in the inning, Jose Bautista hit a go-ahead three-run home run to take a commanding 6–3 lead. Bautista flipped his bat after he scored the home run, which later became popular on social media. Roberto Osuna came on to close the game with a five-out save, becoming the second-youngest pitcher in MLB history to record a postseason save by sealing the 6–3 victory.

=== American League Championship Series ===
On October 15, manager John Gibbons stated that Marco Estrada would start game 1 of the ALCS, and be followed by David Price, Marcus Stroman, and R. A. Dickey.

Shortly before the series began, Kansas City Mayor Sly James issued a challenge to Toronto Mayor John Tory over the result of the series, stating, "we are going to not lose, so I'm really more interested in what you're going to do for us. I will warn you in advance, we have our own maple syrup, so something else maybe." He wagered a selection of ribs and sauces from three local restaurants, while Tory responded the next day with a wager of three types of Toronto craft-brewed beer.

On October 19, beer cans were banned from the 500 level of Rogers Centre for Game 3 of the ALCS, as unruly fans threw beer cans onto the playing field during the previous game there. In one notable incident, a thrown beer can sprayed a baby sitting nearby, resulting in the fan being arrested.

In Game 4 of the ALCS, Cliff Pennington became the first full-time position player to pitch in postseason history.

=== Postseason game log ===
Legend
Blue Jays win	Blue Jays loss	Game postponed

2015 Postseason Game log
American League Division Series: 3–2

#	Date	Opponent	Score	Win	Loss	Save	Attendance	Series
1	October 8	Rangers	3–5	Gallardo (1–0)	Price (0–1)	Dyson (1)	49,834	0–1
2	October 9	Rangers	4–6 (14)	Kela (1–0)	Hawkins (0–1)	Ohlendorf (1)	49,716	0–2
3	October 11	@ Rangers	5–1	Estrada (1–0)	Pérez (0–1)	—	50,941	1–2
4	October 12	@ Rangers	8–4	Price (1–1)	Holland (0–1)	—	47,679	2–2
5	October 14	Rangers	6–3	Sanchez (1–0)	Hamels (0–1)	Osuna (1)	49,742	3–2

American League Championship Series: 2–4

#	Date	Opponent	Score	Win	Loss	Save	Attendance	Series
1	October 16	@ Royals	0–5	Vólquez (1–0)	Estrada (0–1)	—	39,753	0–1
2	October 17	@ Royals	3–6	Duffy (1–0)	Price (0–1)	Davis (1)	40,357	0–2
3	October 19	Royals	11–8	Stroman (1–0)	Cueto (0–1)	—	49,751	1–2
4	October 20	Royals	2–14	Hochevar (1–0)	Dickey (0–1)	—	49,501	1–3
5	October 21	Royals	7–1	Estrada (1–1)	Vólquez (1–1)	—	49,325	2–3
6	October 23	@ Royals	3–4	Davis (1–0)	Osuna (0–1)	—	40,494	2–4

=== Postseason rosters ===
Playoff rosters
American League Division Series

- Pitchers: 6 Marcus Stroman 14 David Price 25 Marco Estrada 27 Brett Cecil (Games 1–2) 31 Liam Hendriks 32 LaTroy Hawkins 41 Aaron Sanchez 43 R. A. Dickey 52 Ryan Tepera (Games 3–5) 54 Roberto Osuna 57 Mark Lowe 62 Aaron Loup
- Catchers: 30 Dioner Navarro 55 Russell Martin
- Infielders: 2 Troy Tulowitzki 9 Cliff Pennington 13 Justin Smoak 15 Chris Colabello 17 Ryan Goins 20 Josh Donaldson
- Outfielders: 3 Ezequiel Carrera 7 Ben Revere 11 Kevin Pillar 19 José Bautista 45 Dalton Pompey
- Designated hitters: 10 Edwin Encarnación

American League Championship Series

- Pitchers: 6 Marcus Stroman 14 David Price 25 Marco Estrada 31 Liam Hendriks 32 LaTroy Hawkins 41 Aaron Sanchez 43 R. A. Dickey 52 Ryan Tepera 54 Roberto Osuna 57 Mark Lowe 62 Aaron Loup
- Catchers: 30 Dioner Navarro 55 Russell Martin
- Infielders: 2 Troy Tulowitzki 9 Cliff Pennington 13 Justin Smoak 15 Chris Colabello 17 Ryan Goins 20 Josh Donaldson
- Outfielders: 3 Ezequiel Carrera 7 Ben Revere 11 Kevin Pillar 19 José Bautista 45 Dalton Pompey
- Designated hitters: 10 Edwin Encarnación

== Roster ==
2015 Toronto Blue Jays
Roster
Pitchers: 67 Andrew Albers; 46 Matt Boyd; 56 Mark Buehrle; 51 Miguel Castro; 27 Brett Cecil; 48 Phil Coke; 28 Scott Copeland; 50 Steve Delabar; 43 R. A. Dickey; 57 Félix Doubront; 25 Marco Estrada; 35 Jeff Francis; 32 LaTroy Hawkins; 31 Liam Hendriks; 36 Drew Hutchison; 49 Colt Hynes; 64 Chad Jenkins; 62 Aaron Loup; 57 Mark Lowe; 32 Daniel Norris; 54 Roberto Osuna; 14 David Price; 59 Rob Rasmussen; 58 Todd Redmond; 41 Aaron Sanchez; 47 Bo Schultz; 6 Marcus Stroman; 52 Ryan Tepera	Catchers: 55 Russell Martin; 30 Dioner Navarro; 22 Josh Thole; Infielders: 18 Darwin Barney; 1 Jonathan Diaz; 20 Josh Donaldson; 10 Edwin Encarnación; 17 Ryan Goins; 23 Matt Hague; 66 Munenori Kawasaki; 9 Cliff Pennington; 7 José Reyes; 13,14 Justin Smoak; 18 Steve Tolleson; 29 Devon Travis; 2 Troy Tulowitzki; 23 Danny Valencia	Outfielders: 19 José Bautista; 3 Ezequiel Carrera; 15 Chris Colabello; 11 Kevin Pillar; 45 Dalton Pompey; 7 Ben Revere; 21 Michael Saunders	Manager: 5 John Gibbons; Coaches: 61 Alex Andreopoulos (bullpen catcher); 16 DeMarlo Hale (bench); 26 Brook Jacoby (hitting); 38 Dane Johnson (bullpen); 34 Tim Leiper (first base); 60 Eric Owens (assistant hitting); 4 Luis Rivera (third base); 40 Pete Walker (pitching)

== Statistics ==
=== Batting ===
Note: G = Games played; AB = At bats; R = Runs; H = Hits; 2B = Doubles; 3B = Triples; HR = Home runs; RBI = Runs batted in; SB = Stolen bases; BB = Walks; AVG = Batting average; Ref. = Reference

Player	G	AB	R	H	2B	3B	HR	RBI	SB	BB	AVG	Ref.
Darwin Barney	15	23	4	7	1	0	2	4	0	1	.304	
José Bautista	153	543	108	136	29	3	40	114	8	110	.250	
Mark Buehrle	32	7	0	1	0	0	0	0	0	1	.143	
Ezequiel Carrera	91	172	27	47	8	0	3	26	2	11	.273	
Chris Colabello	101	333	55	107	19	1	15	54	2	22	.321	
Scott Copeland	5	1	0	0	0	0	0	0	0	0	.000	
Jonathan Diaz	7	13	1	2	0	0	0	2	0	1	.154	
R. A. Dickey	33	3	0	0	0	0	0	0	0	0	.000	
Josh Donaldson	158	620	122	184	41	2	41	123	6	73	.297	
Edwin Encarnación	146	528	94	146	31	0	39	111	3	77	.277	
Marco Estrada	34	6	0	2	0	0	0	0	0	0	.333	
Ryan Goins	128	376	52	94	16	4	5	45	2	39	.250	
Matt Hague	10	12	1	3	1	0	0	0	0	2	.250	
Liam Hendriks	58	0	0	0	0	0	0	0	0	1	.000	
Munenori Kawasaki	23	28	6	6	2	0	0	2	0	4	.214	
Russell Martin	129	441	76	106	23	2	23	77	4	53	.240	
Dioner Navarro	54	171	16	42	7	0	5	20	0	17	.246	
Cliff Pennington	33	75	9	12	3	0	2	11	0	11	.160	
Kevin Pillar	159	586	76	163	31	2	12	56	25	28	.278	
Dalton Pompey	34	94	17	21	8	0	2	6	5	7	.223	
David Price	11	4	0	0	0	0	0	0	0	0	.000	
Ben Revere	56	226	35	72	9	1	1	19	7	13	.319	
José Reyes	69	288	36	82	17	0	4	34	16	17	.285	
Michael Saunders	9	31	2	6	0	0	0	3	0	5	.194	
Justin Smoak	132	296	44	67	16	1	18	59	0	29	.226	
Josh Thole	18	49	5	10	2	0	0	2	0	3	.204	
Steve Tolleson	19	41	9	11	5	1	0	3	2	4	.268	
Devon Travis	62	217	38	66	18	0	8	35	3	18	.304	
Troy Tulowitzki	41	163	31	39	8	0	5	17	1	14	.239	
Danny Valencia	58	162	26	48	13	0	7	29	2	9	.296	
Team totals	162	5509	891	1480	308	17	232	852	88	570	.269	

=== Pitching ===
Note: G = Games pitched; GS = Games started; W = Wins; L = Losses; SV = Saves; ERA = Earned run average; WHIP = Walks plus hits per inning pitched; IP = Innings pitched; H = Hits allowed; R = Total runs allowed; ER = Earned runs allowed; BB = Walks allowed; K = Strikeouts; Ref. = Reference

Player	G	GS	W	L	SV	ERA	WHIP	IP	H	R	ER	BB	K	Ref.
Andrew Albers	1	0	0	0	0	3.38	1.13	2 2/3	1	1	1	2	1	
Matt Boyd	2	2	0	2	0	14.85	2.40	6 2/3	15	11	11	1	7	
Mark Buehrle	32	32	15	8	0	3.81	1.24	198 2/3	214	100	84	33	91	
Miguel Castro	13	0	0	2	4	4.38	1.70	12 1/3	15	7	6	6	12	
Brett Cecil	63	0	5	5	5	2.48	0.96	54 1/3	39	17	15	13	70	
Phil Coke	2	0	0	0	0	3.38	1.13	2 2/3	1	1	1	2	3	
Scott Copeland	5	3	1	1	0	6.46	1.70	15 1/3	24	11	11	2	6	
Steve Delabar	31	0	2	0	1	5.22	1.43	29 1/3	28	19	17	14	30	
R. A. Dickey	33	33	11	11	0	3.91	1.19	214 1/3	195	97	93	61	126	
Félix Doubront	5	4	1	1	0	4.76	1.63	22 2/3	32	15	12	5	13	
Marco Estrada	34	28	13	8	0	3.13	1.07	181	134	67	63	55	131	
Jeff Francis	14	0	1	2	0	6.14	1.64	22	27	16	15	9	21	
LaTroy Hawkins	18	0	1	0	1	2.76	1.53	16 1/3	22	7	5	3	14	
Liam Hendriks	58	0	5	0	0	2.92	1.08	64 2/3	59	23	21	11	71	
Drew Hutchison	30	28	13	5	0	5.57	1.48	150 1/3	179	103	93	44	129	
Colt Hynes	5	0	0	0	0	6.00	3.33	3	8	2	2	2	4	
Chad Jenkins	2	0	0	0	0	4.91	1.64	3 2/3	3	2	2	3	2	
Aaron Loup	60	0	2	5	0	4.46	1.28	42 1/3	47	24	21	7	46	
Mark Lowe	23	0	1	2	1	3.79	0.84	19	15	9	8	1	14	
Daniel Norris	5	5	1	1	0	3.86	1.50	23 1/3	23	11	10	12	18	
Roberto Osuna	68	0	1	6	20	2.58	0.92	69 2/3	48	21	20	16	75	
David Price	11	11	9	1	0	2.30	1.01	74 1/3	57	20	19	18	87	
Rob Rasmussen	1	0	0	0	0	0.00	1.00	1	1	0	0	0	1	
Todd Redmond	7	1	0	0	0	7.31	1.50	16	17	13	13	7	13	
Aaron Sanchez	41	11	7	6	0	3.22	1.28	92 1/3	74	35	33	44	61	
Bo Schultz	31	0	0	1	1	3.56	1.13	43	32	19	17	14	31	
Marcus Stroman	4	4	4	0	0	1.67	0.96	27	20	5	5	6	18	
Ryan Tepera	32	0	0	2	1	3.27	0.88	33	23	14	12	6	22	
Team totals	162	162	93	69	34	3.80	1.21	1441	1353	670	609	397	1117	

== Awards ==
Recipient	Award	Date awarded	Ref.
Devon Travis	American League Rookie of the Month (April)	May 4, 2015	
Josh Donaldson	American League Player of the Week (May 25–31)	June 1, 2015	
Josh Donaldson	All-Star (starter)	July 5, 2015	
José Bautista	All-Star (reserve)	July 6, 2015	
Russell Martin	All-Star (reserve)	July 6, 2015	
Josh Donaldson	American League Co-Player of the Week (August 3–9)	August 10, 2015	
David Price	American League Co-Player of the Week (August 3–9)	August 10, 2015	
Edwin Encarnación	American League Player of the Week (August 24–30)	August 31, 2015	
Edwin Encarnación	American League Player of the Month (August)	September 2, 2015	
Kevin Pillar	American League Player of the Week (September 21–27)	September 28, 2015	
Josh Donaldson	Sporting News Player of the Year Award	October 29, 2015	
Josh Donaldson	American League Hank Aaron Award	October 31, 2015	
Josh Donaldson	American League Silver Slugger Award	November 12, 2015	
Josh Donaldson	American League Most Valuable Player	November 19, 2015	

== Transactions ==
=== April ===
- On April 4, optioned Ryan Goins to Triple-A Buffalo.
- On April 5, placed Michael Saunders and Maicer Izturis on the 15-day disabled list, retroactive to March 27, with a left knee meniscus tear and strained right groin, respectively. Placed Marcus Stroman on the 60-day disabled list with a torn ACL in his right knee. Designated Juan Pablo Oramas for assignment. Purchased the contracts of Miguel Castro, Roberto Osuna, and Devon Travis.
- On April 6, signed free agent pitcher Luis Santos to a minor league contract, and released Juan Pablo Oramas.
- On April 9, assigned Michael Saunders to Advanced-A Dunedin for rehabilitation.
- On April 14, signed free agent pitcher Murphy Smith to a minor league contract.
- On April 16, designated Todd Redmond for assignment and recalled Ryan Goins from Triple-A Buffalo.
- On April 19, optioned Colt Hynes to Triple-A Buffalo, and purchased the contract of Jeff Francis.
- On April 23, placed Dioner Navarro on the 15-day disabled list, retroactive to April 22, with a strained left hamstring. Recalled Josh Thole from Triple-A Buffalo.
- On April 25, designated Steve Tolleson for assignment, and activated Michael Saunders from the 15-day disabled list.
- On April 26, assigned Todd Redmond outright to Triple-A Buffalo.
- On April 28, placed Jose Reyes on the 15-day disabled list with a cracked left rib, and purchased the contract of Jonathan Diaz from Triple-A Buffalo.

=== May ===
- On May 1, optioned Daniel Norris to Triple-A Buffalo, moved Maicer Izturis to the 60-day disabled list with a groin strain, purchased the contract of Andrew Albers, and signed Joel Piñeiro to a minor league contract.
- On May 2, optioned Dalton Pompey and Andrew Albers to Triple-A Buffalo, purchased the contracts of Ezequiel Carrera and Scott Copeland, and designated Matt West and Andy Wilkins for assignment.
- On May 3, traded Andy Wilkins to the Los Angeles Dodgers for cash considerations.
- On May 4, optioned Miguel Castro and Scott Copeland to Triple-A Buffalo, recalled Steve Delabar and Chad Jenkins, and traded Matt West to the Los Angeles Dodgers for cash considerations.
- On May 5, optioned Jonathan Diaz to Triple-A Buffalo, designated Jayson Aquino for assignment, purchased the contract of Chris Colabello, and sent Steve Tolleson outright to Buffalo.
- On May 8, optioned Chad Jenkins to Triple-A Buffalo, and recalled Ryan Tepera.
- On May 10, placed Michael Saunders on the 15-day disabled list with left knee inflammation, purchased the contract of Steve Tolleson, designated Preston Guilmet for assignment, and traded Jayson Aquino to the Pittsburgh Pirates for cash considerations.
- On May 13, Preston Guilmet claimed off waivers by the Tampa Bay Rays.
- On May 15, outrighted Jonathan Diaz to Triple-A Buffalo, signed Luke Scott to a minor league contract, and traded cash considerations to the Houston Astros for Ronald Torreyes and optioned him to Double-A New Hampshire.
- On May 18, designated Jeff Francis for assignment, purchased the contract of Todd Redmond, assigned Maicer Izturis to Advanced-A Dunedin for rehab, and recalled Scott Copeland.
- On May 19, designated Todd Redmond for assignment.
- On May 20, outrighted Jeff Francis to Triple-A Buffalo.
- On May 21, assigned Jose Reyes to Triple-A Buffalo for rehab.
- On May 22, placed Devon Travis on the 15-day disabled list, retroactive to May 17, with left shoulder inflammation, and purchased the contract of Munenori Kawasaki.
- On May 25, activated Jose Reyes from the 15-day disabled list, and optioned Munenori Kawasaki to Triple-A Buffalo.
- On May 26, assigned Dioner Navarro to Triple-A Buffalo for rehab, and signed Cole Garner to a minor league contract.
- On May 28, optioned Scott Copeland to Triple-A Buffalo.
- On May 29, recalled Bo Schultz from Triple-A Buffalo, outrighted Todd Redmond, and assigned Devon Travis to Triple-A for rehab.
- On May 31, signed Phil Coke to a minor league contract, placed Steve Tolleson on the 15-day disabled list, retroactive to May 27, with a left groin strain, and recalled Munenori Kawasaki from Triple-A Buffalo.

=== June ===
- On June 2, activated Dioner Navarro from the 15-day disabled list, and recalled Scott Copeland.
- On June 3, optioned Josh Thole and Scott Copeland to Triple-A Buffalo.
- On June 5, traded cash considerations to the Chicago White Sox for Martin Medina.
- On June 10, optioned Munenori Kawasaki to Triple-A Buffalo, outrighted Andrew Albers, and recalled Scott Copeland.
- On June 11, optioned Scott Copeland to Triple-A Buffalo, assigned Steve Tolleson to Advanced-A Dunedin for rehab, and purchased the contract of Phil Coke.
- On June 12, traded Ronald Torreyes to the Los Angeles Dodgers for cash considerations.
- On June 13, assigned Steve Tolleson to Triple-A Buffalo for rehab.
- On June 14, placed Aaron Sanchez on the 15-day disabled list, retroactive to June 6, with a right lat strain.
- On June 15, assigned Devon Travis to Double-A New Hampshire for rehab, recalled Scott Copeland from Triple-A Buffalo, and signed 32 draft selections and 6 undrafted free agents.
- On June 18, assigned Devon Travis to Triple-A Buffalo for rehab.
- On June 19, placed R. A. Dickey on the bereavement list, and recalled Munenori Kawasaki.
- On June 22, optioned Scott Copeland, Phil Coke, and Ryan Tepera to Triple-A Buffalo, activated R. A. Dickey from the bereavement list, recalled Rob Rasmussen, purchased the contract of Todd Redmond, and signed undrafted free agent Jackson Lowery. Phil Coke elected free agency after being optioned.
- On June 26, optioned Munenori Kawasaki to Triple-A Buffalo, and activated Devon Travis from the 15-day disabled list.
- On June 27, optioned Rob Rasmussen to Triple-A Buffalo, and purchased the contract of Matt Boyd.

=== July ===
- On July 1, designated Steve Tolleson for assignment.
- On July 2, sent Steve Tolleson outright to Triple-A Buffalo, and signed international free agents Vladimir Guerrero Jr. and Yeison Esteban Valdez.
- On July 3, designated Todd Redmond for assignment, optioned Matt Boyd to Triple-A Buffalo, recalled Ryan Tepera, and purchased the contract of Felix Doubront.
- On July 5, sent Todd Redmond outright to Triple-A Buffalo.
- On July 6, signed draft selection Reggie Pruitt.
- On July 7, assigned Aaron Sanchez to the Rookie Gulf Coast League Blue Jays for rehab.
- On July 11, assigned Aaron Sanchez to the Advanced-A Dunedin Blue Jays for rehab.
- On July 16, assigned Aaron Sanchez to the Triple-A Buffalo Bisons for rehab.
- On July 22, signed Joba Chamberlain to a minor league contract, and claimed Ty Kelly off waivers from the St. Louis Cardinals and optioned him to Triple-A Buffalo.
- On July 25, activated Aaron Sanchez from the 15-day disabled list, and optioned Steve Delabar to Triple-A Buffalo.
- On July 28, signed Phillippe Aumont to a minor league contract, and acquired Troy Tulowitzki and LaTroy Hawkins from the Colorado Rockies in exchange for José Reyes, Miguel Castro, Jeff Hoffman, and Jesus Tinoco.
- On July 29, designated Felix Doubront for assignment, and activated Troy Tulowitzki.
- On July 30, acquired David Price from the Detroit Tigers in exchange for Daniel Norris, Matt Boyd, and Jairo Labourt.
- On July 31, activated David Price, placed Devon Travis on the 15-day disabled list, retroactive to July 29, with a left shoulder strain, acquired Mark Lowe from the Seattle Mariners for Rob Rasmussen, Jacob Brentz, and Nick Wells, acquired Ben Revere from the Philadelphia Philles for Alberto Tirado and Jimmy Cordero, and traded Felix Doubront to the Oakland Athletics for cash considerations.

=== August ===
- On August 1, optioned Ryan Tepera to Triple-A Buffalo, recalled Munenori Kawasaki, designated Ezequiel Carrera and Danny Valencia for assignment, activated Ben Revere and Mark Lowe, and signed Chris Smith and Ronald Concepcion to minor league contracts.
- On August 3, sent Ezequiel Carrera outright to Triple-A Buffalo, claimed Ben Rowen off waivers from the Chicago Cubs and assigned him to Triple-A Buffalo, and sent Danny Valencia to the Oakland Athletics on a waiver claim.
- On August 4, acquired Gustavo Pierre from the Philadelphia Phillies.
- On August 5, signed George Kottaras to a minor league contract, and changed Aaron Sanchez's roster status to suspended.
- On August 8, activated Aaron Sanchez, and acquired Cliff Pennington and cash considerations from the Arizona Diamondbacks for Dawel Lugo.
- On August 9, optioned Munenori Kawasaki to Triple-A Buffalo, and activated Cliff Pennington.
- On August 13, signed Chris Heisey to a minor league contract.
- On August 17, optioned Drew Hutchison and Aaron Loup to Triple-A Buffalo, and recalled Matt Hague.
- On August 18, purchased the contract of Ezequiel Carrera, and signed Derek Blacksher to a minor league contract.
- On August 19, signed Lendy Castillo to a minor league contract.
- On August 20, traded Randy Wolf to the Detroit Tigers for cash considerations.
- On August 23, optioned Matt Hague to Triple-A Buffalo, and recalled Josh Thole.
- On August 25, signed Christian Cox to a minor league contract, transferred Michael Saunders to the 60-day disabled list with left knee inflammation, and claimed Donn Roach off waivers from the Cincinnati Reds and assigned him to Triple-A Buffalo.
- On August 28, claimed Danny Dorn off waivers from the Arizona Diamondbacks.
- On August 29, optioned Josh Thole to Rookie-Advanced Bluefield and Danny Dorn to Triple-A Buffalo, recalled Drew Hutchison, and designated Ty Kelly for assignment.
- On August 31, traded Chris Heisey to the Los Angeles Dodgers for a player to be named later, and outrighted Ty Kelly to Triple-A Buffalo.

=== September ===
- On September 1, recalled Munenori Kawasaki, Aaron Loup, Dalton Pompey, and Ryan Tepera, designated Colt Hynes for assignment, and purchased the contract of Jeff Francis.
- On September 2, recalled Josh Thole, and assigned Marcus Stroman to the Class-A Lansing Lugnuts for rehab.
- On September 3, outrighted Colt Hynes to Triple-A Buffalo.
- On September 6, designated Danny Dorn for assignment, claimed Matt Dominguez off waivers from the Milwaukee Brewers, and optioned him to Triple-A Buffalo.
- On September 7, assigned Marcus Stroman to the Triple-A Buffalo Bisons for rehab.
- On September 8, recalled Steve Delabar and Matt Hague.
- On September 9, outrighted Danny Dorn to Triple-A Buffalo.
- On September 11, recalled Chad Jenkins, activated Marcus Stroman, and transferred Devon Travis to the 60-day disabled list with a left shoulder strain.
- On September 13, designated Scott Copeland for assignment, and acquired Darwin Barney from the Los Angeles Dodgers for Jack Murphy.
- On September 16, outrighted Scott Copeland to Triple-A Buffalo.
- On September 30, designated Donn Roach for assignment, and purchased the contract of Jonathan Diaz.

== Farm system ==
Level	Team	League	Manager	Win–loss record	Position	Postseason	Ref.
Triple-A	Buffalo Bisons	International League	Gary Allenson	68–76	3rd place International North; 13 GB	Did not qualify	
Double-A	New Hampshire Fisher Cats	Eastern League	Bobby Meacham	69–71	T-4th place Eastern League Eastern; 10 1/2 GB	Did not qualify	
Advanced-A	Dunedin Blue Jays	Florida State League	Omar Malavé	32–38 (first half); 29–38 (second half)	5th place (first half); 4th place (second half); Florida State League North; 13 GB	Did not qualify	
Class-A	Lansing Lugnuts	Midwest League	Ken Huckaby	42–28 (first half); 31–38 (second half)	1st place (first half); 7th place (second half); Midwest League Eastern; 13 1/2 GB	3–2; Lost semi-final East	
Short Season-A	Vancouver Canadians	Northwest League	John Schneider	16–22 (first half); 18–20 (second half)	4th place (first half); 3rd place (second half); Northwest League North; 2 GB	Did not qualify	
Rookie Advanced	Bluefield Blue Jays	Appalachian League	Dennis Holmberg	25–42	5th place Appalachian League East; 18 1/2 GB	Did not qualify	
Rookie	GCL Blue Jays	Gulf Coast League	Cesar Martin	39–19	1st place GCL Northwest	1–2; Lost GCL Finals	
Rookie	DSL Blue Jays	Dominican Summer League	Jose Mateo	45–27	1st place BC Baseball City	0–2; Lost semi-final B	
