= Bo Schultz =

American baseball player (born 1985)

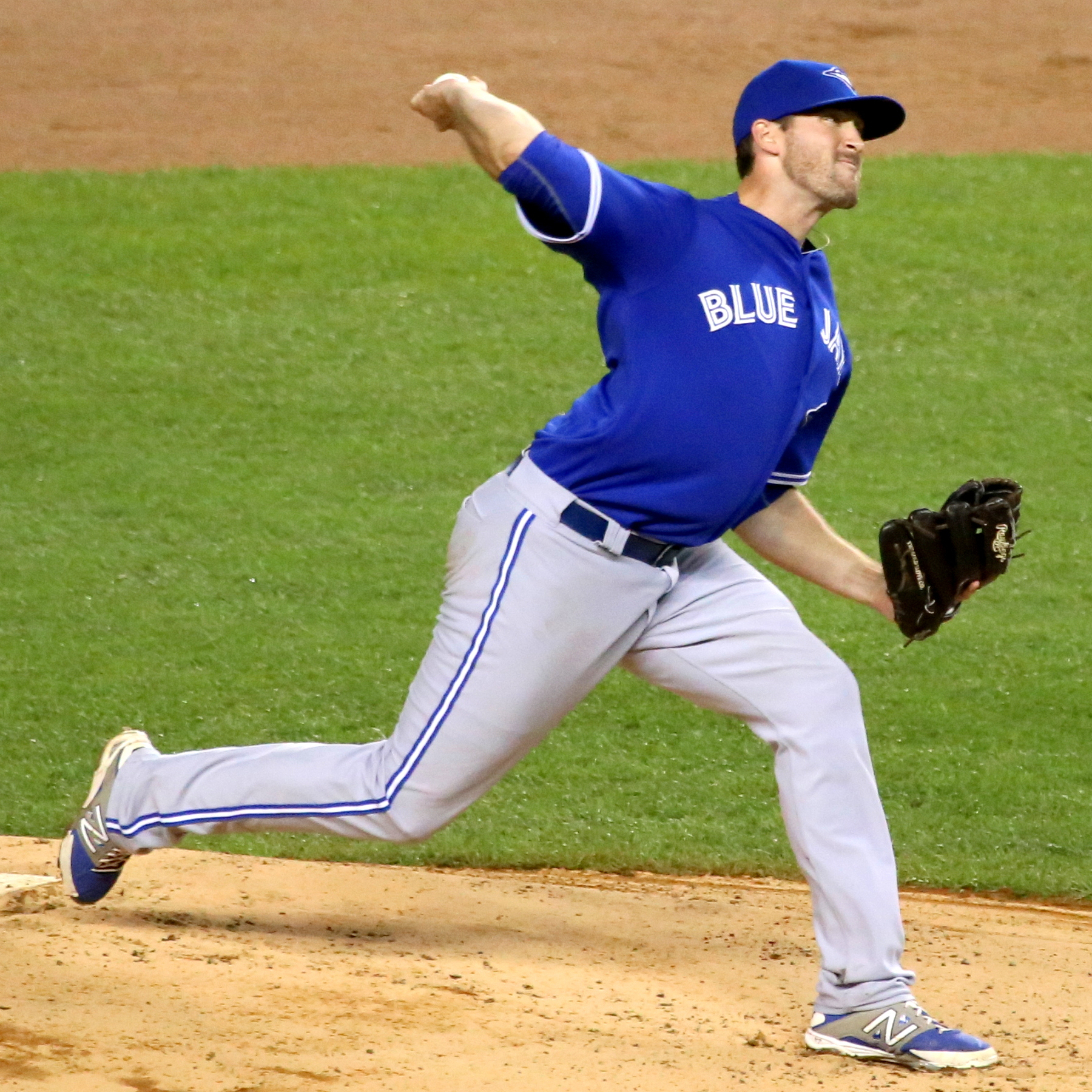
- Schultz with the Toronto Blue Jays in 2015
- Pitcher
- Born: September 25, 1985 (age 39); Dallas, Texas, U.S.
- Batted: Right Threw: Right

MLB debut
- March 22, 2014, for the Arizona Diamondbacks

Last MLB appearance
- September 18, 2016, for the Toronto Blue Jays

MLB statistics
- Win–loss record: 0–3
- Earned run average: 4.54
- Strikeouts: 46
- Stats at Baseball Reference

Teams
- Arizona Diamondbacks (2014); Toronto Blue Jays (2015–2016)

Patrick Bowen Schultz (born September 25, 1985) is an American former professional baseball pitcher. He played in Major League Baseball (MLB) for the Arizona Diamondbacks and Toronto Blue Jays.

== High school and college ==
Schultz attended Highland Park High School in University Park, Texas, where he played with fellow major leaguer Clayton Kershaw. Northwestern University, where he played college baseball for the Northwestern Wildcats. He had a 3–10 win–loss record and a 9.13 earned run average (ERA) in college.

== Professional career ==
=== Oakland Athletics ===
Not selected in the 2008 Major League Baseball draft, Schultz signed with the Oakland Athletics as an undrafted free agent. He was assigned to the Arizona League Athletics for the season, where he pitched to a 4–3 win–loss record, 5.24 ERA, and 30 strikeouts in 44 2/3 innings. In 2009, Schultz was promoted to the Short Season-A Vancouver Canadians of the Northwest League. In 26 relief appearances totaling 44 innings pitched, Schultz would post a 2–3 record, 2.66 ERA, and 48 strikeouts. He was also named the league's Pitcher of the Week on September 7.

Continuing his progression through the minor leagues, Schultz was promoted to the Class-A Kane County Cougars, where he would go 6–1 with a 2.87 ERA and 65 strikeouts in 75 1/3 innings. He struggled in the 2011 season, making seven appearances for the Advanced-A Stockton Ports and posting a 14.85 ERA before being released by the Athletics organization. He signed with the Grand Prairie AirHogs of the American Association of Independent Professional Baseball and spent the remainder of the season there. Schultz made 37 total appearances for Grand Prairie, and pitched to a 4–3 record, 4.12 ERA, and 54 strikeouts in 72 innings.

=== Arizona Diamondbacks ===
In early 2012, Schultz signed a minor league contract with the Arizona Diamondbacks organization, and was assigned to the Advanced-A Visalia Rawhide. He would later earn a promotion to the Double-A Mobile BayBears, and in total, made 46 relief appearances in the 2012 season, posting a 6–5 win–loss, 3.58 ERA, and 49 strikeouts in 55 1/3 innings. Schultz opened the 2013 season with Mobile, and made 20 appearances, 16 of which were starts. He was then promoted to the Triple-A Reno Aces, where he made 17 relief appearances to end the season. Schultz posted a combined 5–6 record, 3.35 ERA, and 75 strikeouts in 104 2/3 innings. He was added to the Diamondbacks' 40-man roster after the end of the season. In the offseason, Schultz made seven starts for the Salt River Rafters of the Arizona Fall League, posting a 3–0 win–loss record, 3.09 ERA, and 28 strikeouts in 32 total innings.

Schultz competed for a spot on the Diamondbacks' Opening Day roster in spring training in 2014. With the ability to carry ten relievers on the roster for a two-game series against the Los Angeles Dodgers in Sydney, Australia, he was named to their Opening Day roster, with the expectation that the Diamondbacks would assign him back to Triple-A after the series. He made his MLB debut on March 22, 2014. Schultz made four relief appearances for the Diamondbacks in 2014, pitching to a 0–1 record, 7.88 ERA, and five strikeouts in eight innings. In Triple-A that year, Schultz would post a 10–8 record with a 6.18 ERA and 82 strikeouts in a career-high 135 1/3 innings.

=== Toronto Blue Jays ===
On October 7, 2014, the Toronto Blue Jays acquired Schultz from the Diamondbacks on waivers. Schultz was optioned to the Triple-A Buffalo Bisons on March 25, 2015. He was recalled on May 29. Schultz made his debut for the Blue Jays on June 2, pitching two relief innings against the Washington Nationals. On July 23, he earned his first MLB save, closing out a 5–2 win over the Oakland Athletics. Schultz ended the year with a 0–1 record, 3.56 ERA, and 31 strikeouts in 43 total innings.

During the 2015 offseason, Schultz underwent left hip surgery, and was expected to miss most if not all of 2016 spring training. Schultz was recalled from the Bisons on June 26, 2016. He was optioned back to Buffalo on July 27, following the acquisition of Joaquín Benoit. Schultz was recalled by the Blue Jays on August 27, after Aaron Loup was designated for assignment. Schultz made 16 relief appearances in 2016, and went 0–1 with a 5.51 ERA and 10 strikeouts in 16 1/3 innings.

On March 27, 2017, the Blue Jays confirmed that Schultz would open the 2017 season on the disabled list due to an elbow injury. The following day, it was announced that Schultz would have surgery on his right elbow to remove bone chips and examine his ulnar collateral ligament. On March 29, Schultz underwent Tommy John surgery. On November 1, 2017, Schultz was outrighted to Triple-A Buffalo. He elected free agency on November 7.

=== Pittsburgh Pirates ===
On January 5, 2018, Schultz signed a minor league contract with the Pittsburgh Pirates. He made 32 appearances out of the bullpen for the High–A Bradenton Marauders and Triple–A Indianapolis Indians, pitching to a 1.43 ERA with 32 strikeouts and 3 saves across 27 2/3 innings of work. Schultz elected free agency following the season on November 2.

=== Baltimore Orioles ===
On January 11, 2019, Schultz signed a minor league contract with the Baltimore Orioles. He was released prior to the start of the season on March 20.
