= Friendly political wager =

A friendly political wager is a largely symbolic form of sports betting made between politicians representing two cities or areas on the outcome of an important sports contest between teams representing those same two cities or areas. These wagers are most commonly made in the United States and Canada on the results of playoffs in the National Hockey League, National Football League and Major League Baseball as well as, on occasion, the Olympic Games. Although they are technically a form of gambling, friendly political wagers are generally tolerated by the sports leagues and regulatory authorities as harmless publicity stunts and gestures of regional pride.

== Differences from typical sports betting ==
Friendly political wagers

- The wagers are highly publicised, usually with official press releases.
- The participants are generally high-ranking politicians; most commonly mayors, but also frequently including governors, and Senators and (much more rarely) even national leaders. For additional effect, the two wagering parties may be (but are not always) members of opposite political parties.
- The bets are made directly with each other, with no bookmakers involved.
- Point spread is disregarded.
- The participants must bet in favor of the team that they represent; for instance, the mayor of Green Bay would only make a friendly wager of this sort on the outcome of a Green Bay Packers game by betting in favor of the Packers.
- Usually occur during high-profile playoff games.
- Are for symbolic wagers, usually prestige or local food or drink.
- In the rare event money is wagered, the wager is donated to a local charity in the winner's metropolitan area.
- They do not involve wagering the office (a rival officeholder cannot demand his opponent's resignation).
- They do not involve influencing the office by way of the bet (such as by demanding the signage or veto of a legislative act to satisfy the bet).

== Examples ==
The most common types of wager are those for symbolic value only, and those for a token food prize.

For example, in the 2009–10 NFL playoffs, two bets were made:

- Senators Mary Landrieu of Louisiana and Amy Klobuchar of Minnesota made a friendly wager on the outcome of the 2010 National Football Conference Championship Game between the New Orleans Saints and the Minnesota Vikings: "If the Saints win, Klobuchar will cook gumbo and deliver it to Landrieu's office while wearing a Drew Brees jersey for Louisiana constituents to enjoy. If the Vikings win, Landrieu will cook a Minnesota wild rice casserole and deliver it to Klobuchar's office while wearing a Brett Favre jersey for Minnesota constituents to enjoy." The Saints won.
- Maryland Governor Martin O'Malley and Massachusetts Governor Deval Patrick bet over the outcome of the game between the Baltimore Ravens and the New England Patriots. O'Malley promised Maryland crab cakes to Patrick if the Ravens lost, while Patrick pledged lobsters if the Patriots lost. The Ravens prevailed, and O'Malley, in a YouTube video, said "Hey Deval, send down the lob-stah" in a mock Boston accent."

During the 2010 Winter Olympic Games, US President Barack Obama and Canada Prime Minister Stephen Harper wagered a case of beer on the outcome of the gold medal game in the men's ice hockey tournament. President Obama sent Prime Minister Harper a case of Molson Canadian and a case of Yuengling lager (Obama's favorite beer, brewed in Pennsylvania) to settle the bet.

A similar sort of betting occurs elsewhere, although the subject is as likely not to be sport. German Green politician and gastronome Joschka Fischer was noted for betting cases of wine and fine spirits on the outcomes of German elections with politicians of other parties.

In October 2011, Australian Prime Minister Julia Gillard and New Zealand Prime Minister John Key made two bets: the first on the NRL grand final between the Manly Sea Eagles and the New Zealand Warriors, wagering having to hold a press conference in front of the other country's flag; and the second on the 2011 Rugby World Cup semi-final between New Zealand and Australia, wagering having to eat an apple from the other country and speak profusely on how good it was (reflecting Australia recently lifting a ban on the import of New Zealand apples). Key subsequently lost the NRL bet, and Gillard subsequently lost the Rugby World Cup bet.
