= Barry Davis (sportscaster) =

Canadian sportscaster (born 1968)

- Born: January 8, 1968 (age 58); Hialeah, Florida, U.S.
- Education: Humber College
- Occupation: Sportscaster
- Years active: 1992–present

Barry Davis (born January 8, 1968) is a Canadian sportscaster formerly of Sportsnet and hosted the Outta The Park podcast.

Davis began his broadcasting career in 1992 as a technical operator at CJCL 1430 (currently 590 The FAN) in Toronto. In 2002, he became a reporter for the Toronto Maple Leafs at Sportsnet. He would later go on to become a Toronto Blue Jays field reporter at Sportsnet and followed them on their latest playoff runs of 2015 and 2016.

In 2017, Davis left Sportsnet to pursue "new and exciting" opportunities. He began his own media company No Suit Required Media. He hosts the Outta The Park podcast, which last released an episode in 2021.

Davis had two passions growing up, sports and music. He is the lead singer and guitarist of a Tom Petty tribute band, We Ain't Petty. His band currently performs throughout the greater Toronto area.
