= 2015 Boston Red Sox season =

Major League Baseball season

2015 Boston Red Sox
- League: American League
- Division: East
- Ballpark: Fenway Park
- City: Boston, Massachusetts
- Record: 78–84 (.481)
- Divisional place: 5th
- Owners: John W. Henry (Fenway Sports Group)
- President: Larry Lucchino
- President of baseball operations: Dave Dombrowski (from August 18)
- General managers: Ben Cherington (until August 18); Mike Hazen (from September 23)
- Managers: John Farrell (50–63); Torey Lovullo (interim; 28–21)
- Television: NESN (Don Orsillo, Jerry Remy, Dennis Eckersley, Tom Caron, Jon Rish, Steve Lyons, Gary Striewski, Adam Pellerin, Elle Duncan)
- Radio: WEEI-FM; Boston Red Sox Radio Network (Joe Castiglione, Dave O'Brien, Sean Grande, Lou Merloni, Uri Berenguer, Juan Oscar Baez)
- Stats: ESPN.com; Baseball Reference

The 2015 Boston Red Sox season was the 115th season in the franchise's Major League Baseball history. The Red Sox finished last in the five-team American League East with a record of 78–84, fifteen games behind the first place Toronto Blue Jays. It was the third last-place finish for the team in four years.

== Offseason ==
=== October 2014 ===
- On October 30, 2014, the Red Sox re-signed closer RHP Koji Uehara to a two-year, $18 million contract.

=== November 2014 ===
- On November 24, 2014, the Red Sox signed IF Pablo Sandoval to a five-year, $100 million contract and IF/OF Hanley Ramírez to a four-year, $90 million contract.

=== December 2014 ===
- On December 10, 2014, the Red Sox traded RHP Rubby De La Rosa and RHP Allen Webster to the Diamondbacks for LHP Wade Miley.
- On December 11, 2014, the Red Sox traded OF Yoenis Céspedes, RHP Alex Wilson and prospect RHP Gabe Speier to the Tigers for RHP Rick Porcello. Later that day, the Red Sox signed RHP Justin Masterson to a one-year, $9.5 million contract.
- On December 17, 2014, the Red Sox traded prospect RHP Aaron Kurcz to the Braves for reliever RHP Anthony Varvaro.
- On December 19, 2014, the Red Sox traded 3B Will Middlebrooks to the Padres for C Ryan Hanigan. Later that day the Red Sox re-signed reliever LHP Craig Breslow to a one-year, $2 million contract.

=== January 2015 ===
- On January 27, 2015, the Red Sox traded RHP Anthony Ranaudo to the Rangers for LHP Robbie Ross Jr.
- On January 30, 2015, the Red Sox signed RHP Alexi Ogando to a one-year, $1.5 million contract.

=== February 2015 ===
- On February 21, 2015, the Red Sox extended manager John Farrell's contract through 2017, with a club option for 2018. Later that day, it was revealed, that the contract of GM Ben Cherington had been extended during the 2014 campaign, for an unknown period.

=== March 2015 ===
- On March 30, 2015, the Red Sox acquired C Sandy León from the Washington Nationals for cash considerations.

== Regular season ==
=== Opening Day ===
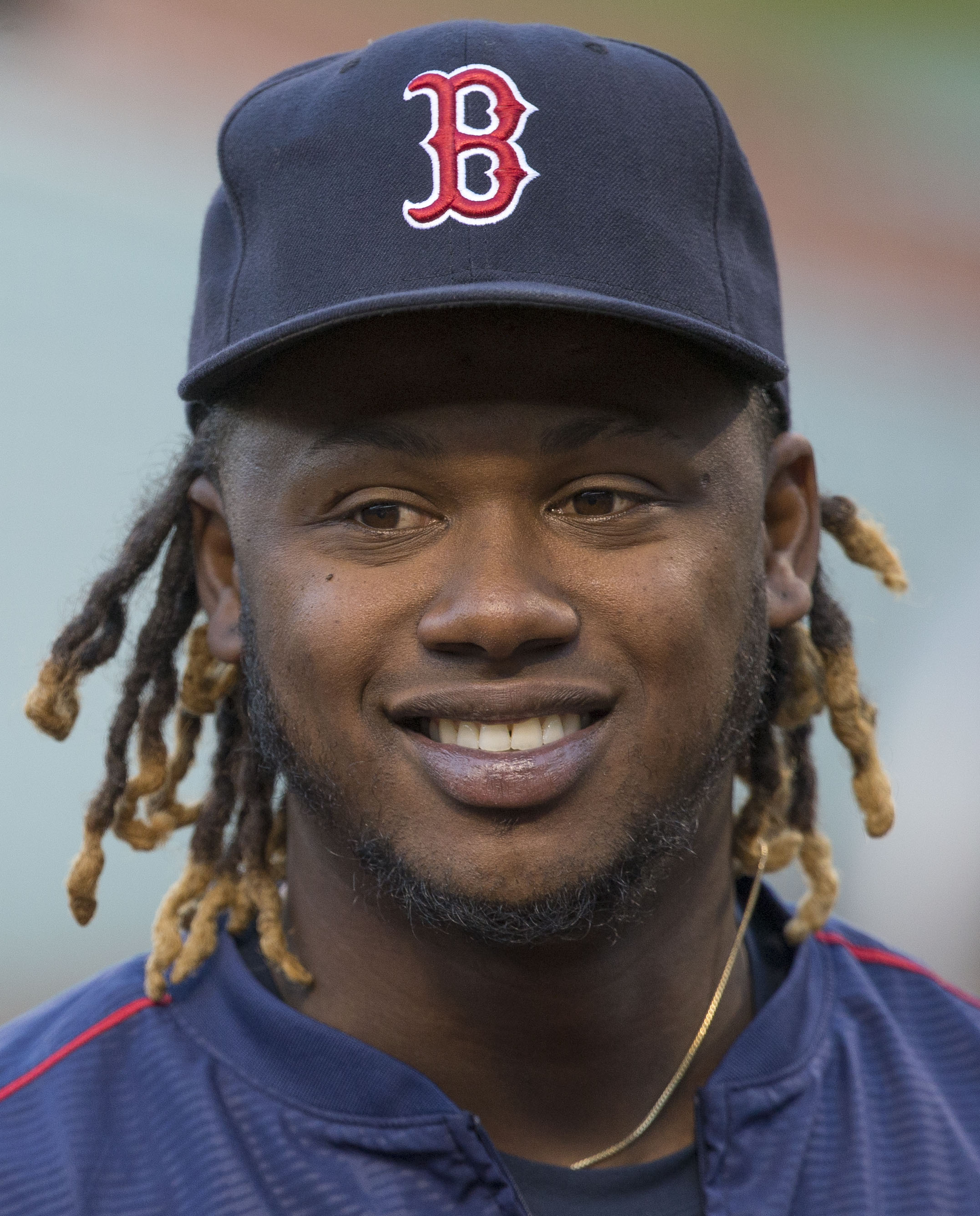
Hanley Ramírez went deep twice, including a grand slam, in his return to the Boston line-up on opening day. He finished the month with a league-tying 10 home runs for first place.

The 2015 Red Sox season opened on April 6, with an afternoon game against the Philadelphia Phillies in Citizens Bank Park. It was the first time in franchise history that the Red Sox opened the season against an interleague opponent. Clay Buchholz, in his first career Opening Day start, went seven scoreless innings, giving up three hits, one walk and striking out nine. He committed one error in the first inning and handed a 4–0 lead over to the bullpen. Junichi Tazawa and Tommy Layne held the Phillies scoreless. Dustin Pedroia and Hanley Ramírez both homered twice, two solo shots by Pedroia, a solo shot and a grand slam by Ramirez. Mookie Betts added a solo home run and Boston won 8–0.

==== Opening Day lineup ====
50	Mookie Betts	CF
15	Dustin Pedroia	2B
34	David Ortiz	1B
13	Hanley Ramírez	LF
48	Pablo Sandoval	3B
18	Shane Victorino	RF
2	Xander Bogaerts	SS
10	Ryan Hanigan	C
11	Clay Buchholz	P

Note: no designated hitter (DH), per the rules at this time, due to playing in a National League park

=== April ===
April 6–9, in Philadelphia
On April 6, right after the opening day game against the Phillies, the Red Sox announced that they signed free-agent-to-be RHP Rick Porcello to a four-year, $82.5 million contract extension through 2019, contradicting an earlier report, that both parties won't engage in contract negotiations during the season. Game 2: In game two of the three-game road series in Philadelphia, Hanley Ramírez left the bases loaded, against former Red Sox closer Jonathan Papelbon, in the top of the eighth by flying out to Ben Revere on the warning track, just missing his second grand slam of the season and Boston lost 2–4. Game 3: In the final game, Xander Bogaerts drove in three runs with a triple and pitcher Justin Masterson had one RBI in two hits and the Red Sox took the opening series with a 6–2 win.
Red Sox won the series 2–1 (16–6 runs)

April 10–12, in New York (AL)
Game 1: Game one of the first series against the Yankees went into extra innings, after a blown save by Edward Mujica in the bottom of the ninth tying the game 3–3. In the bottom of the 12th inning, during Carlos Beltrán's at bat, some of the lights went out in Yankee stadium, and the game went into a light delay. Play resumed after a 16-minute delay. The game remained tied until the top of the 16th, when David Ortiz went deep. But Mark Teixeira tied the game in the bottom with a home run as well. In the top of the 18th, Red Sox took the lead again with an RBI single by Pablo Sandoval, but yet again the Yankees tied it with an RBI double by Beltrán. In the top of the 19th Mookie Betts drove in Bogaerts with a sacrifice fly and this time New York could not answer, despite a leadoff single by Jacoby Ellsbury. Having used all of their bullpen both teams relied on long relief. Esmil Rogers went 4 2/3 innings, and 81 pitches for New York and Steven Wright had 5 innings and 78 pitches. The game went 6 hours and 49 minutes, the longest in Red Sox Franchise history. Game 2: Joe Kelly, in his first start of the season, pitched one run, one hit ball for seven innings in game two of the series. Brock Holt had a 4 hit day with 3 RBIs, Dustin Pedroia and Daniel Nava collected 2 RBIs each. Alexi Ogando gave up three 2-out hits in the eighth, one three-run shot by Chris Young, before Anthony Varvaro got the last out in the eighth and Robbie Ross shut the door in the ninth. Game 3: Clay Buchholz could not repeat his stellar opening day outing, allowing 10 runs (9 earned) in 3 1/3 innings and the Red Sox dropped the series finale 4–14 in the Bronx.
Red Sox won the series 2–1 (18–23 runs)

April 13–15, vs. Washington
Game 1: Nationals Starter Jordan Zimmermann was chased after 2 1/3 innings in the Red Sox home opener, when the Red Sox scored eight runs in the first three innings, with the help of questionable defense by Washington in the third. Betts robbed Bryce Harper of a home run in the first inning, stole two bases in one play in the same inning and had a three-run home run in the third. Porcello allowed four runs, three earned, in eight innings of work and the Red Sox won 9–4. Before the game closer Koji Uehara was activated from the 15-day DL and Tommy Layne was optioned to Triple-A Pawtucket. Game 2: After surrendering a 5–1 lead to a six-run top of the fifth by the Nationals, Boston took advantage of two hit batsmen and three errors (two by pitcher Blake Treinen on the same play) in the bottom of the seventh to regain the lead, scoring three runs without the benefit of a hit. Koji Uehara earned his first save in his first appearance of the season with a perfect ninth inning. The Red Sox secured the first three series in a season for the first time since 1952 and scored the most runs in a hitless inning since August 25, 2001 against the Rangers. Pablo Sandoval left the game early due to a bruised foot, which moved Hanley Ramírez back to the infield, and an MRI for Xander Bogaerts, who was sidelined for the game, came back clean. Game 3: Washington avoided the sweep on Jackie Robinson Day and chased Wade Miley early from the game in the top of the third inning. Boston's rally ended in the top of the seventh when Tyler Moore lifted a two-run home run over the Green Monster and eventually lost the game 5–10.
Red Sox won the series 2–1 (22–21 runs)

April 17–20, vs. Baltimore
Game 1: Orioles starter Ubaldo Jiménez was ejected after 3 2/3 innings for hitting Pablo Sandoval up on the right shoulder near the head in the first game of a four-game series. Ryan Hanigan tied the game in the bottom of fifth with his first long ball as a member of the Red Sox. In the bottom of the ninth Mike Napoli drew a lead-off walk, Daniel Nava moved him in scoring position with a sacrifice bunt and Xander Bogaerts drove him in with a bloop single for the first Boston walk-off of the season. Game 2: In game 2 Orioles pitching held the Red Sox offense to just one run while their own offense got 11 hits from Clay Buchholz but only scored twice. Buchholz pitched himself out of a bases-loaded, nobody out situation in the top of the fifth, David Ortiz and Brock Holt had both a three hit day, accounting for six of the seven hits. Game 3: Rick Porcello and Miguel González exchanged home runs in the first inning, a two-run shot by Adam Jones and a three-run shot by Hanley Ramírez, in the third game. That was all the offense for the Red Sox while Baltimore scored six more runs, all charged to Porcello. The game was delayed in the middle of the fourth due to an injury by home plate umpire Paul Emmel, the umpires finished the game with three men. David Ortiz was ejected in the bottom of fifth, arguing a check swing appeal. Game 4: The final game of the four-game series was rain shortened to seven innings on Patriots' Day and the 103rd birthday of Fenway Park. Boston scored four times and brought ten batters to the plate on only one hit in the bottom of the third, supporting one-run ball from Justin Masterson in five innings. The game was called after a 1:42 hour delay.
Red Sox split the series 2–2 (14–15 runs)

April 21–23, in St. Petersburg
Game 1: Koji Uehara earned his second save of the season, after shutout game by Wade Miley with the help of the bullpen, against the Rays. The lone run of the game was scored on a throwing error by second baseman Ryan Brett in the top of the third inning. Game 2: Joe Kelly went into the sixth inning with a four-run lead, but gave up four straight hits followed by a bases loaded walk with nobody out. Craig Breslow could not stop the bleeding and allowed two inherited runners to score, tying the game 5–5. Edward Mujica gave up two more runs in the bottom of the seventh from which the Red Sox could not recover. Dustin Pedroia hit a two-run home run and David Ortiz passed Chipper Jones on the all-time home run leader list to take sole possession of 32nd place with 469 career home runs. Game 3: Clay Buchholz went six innings allowing only two hits and one run with a season high ten strikeouts. The game remained tied into the bottom of the ninth inning, where Buchholz saw his efforts wasted with René Rivera's hit off of Anthony Varvaro down the third base line, allowing Tim Beckham to score the walk-off run from second base. This was the first series lost by the Red Sox this season.
Red Sox lost the series 1–2 (7–9 runs)

April 24–26, in Baltimore
Game 1: Rick Porcello struck out the first five Baltimore batters he faced, ending up with a season high seven strikeouts for the game, but struggled in the bottom of the fourth, giving up a two-run home run to Jimmy Paredes. With two outs in the top of the fifth Miguel González walked Mookie Betts and gave up a single to Dustin Pedroia before David Ortiz and Hanley Ramírez hit back-to-back home runs, the first consecutive home runs for the Red Sox in this season. Porcello headed into the seventh inning but allowed a lead-off walk followed by a single. Craig Breslow took over and loaded the bases with an intentional base on balls after a successful sacrifice bunt. O's tied the game with a sacrifice fly by Everth Cabrera. Alexi Ogando reloaded the bases by walking Steve Pearce but struck out Manny Machado to end the inning. Again with two outs Pablo Sandoval walked, Allen Craig reached on an error by Machado and Brock Holt hit a three-run shot in the top of the eighth, his first home run of the season. Junichi Tazawa gave up his first run of the season, a solo home run to Chris Davis and handed the ball to closer Koji Uehara who gave up two hits but stranded the runners on first and third. Game 2: The Orioles took an early lead but Mike Napoli quickly tied the game with his first home run of the season. Baltimore took the lead again, with a solo home run in the bottom of the fifth by Jimmy Paredes. The Red Sox could tie the game in the top of the ninth with the help of struggling infield defense. In the top of tenth Boston took the lead with a solo home run by Xander Bogaerts but Koji Uehara could not close the game, allowing his first two earned runs of the season and his first blown save. Prior to the game Shane Victorino was placed on the disabled list and Matt Barnes got the call-up from Triple-A Pawtucket. He pitched two scoreless innings in relief and was optioned back to the PawSox for Heath Hembree on Sunday. Game 3: Wade Miley imploded in the third inning, giving up six earned runs. This was nearly a carbon copy of this second to last outing against the Nationals, giving up seven runs, six earned, in 2 1/3 innings. Baltimore's bats stayed hot, adding 11 more runs against the Boston bullpen. Hanley Ramírez homered twice and Pablo Sandoval hit his first home run of the season. The Red Sox dropped two series in a row, after winning the first three series and splitting the fourth.
Red Sox lost the series 1–2 (18–28 runs)

April 27–29, vs. Toronto
Game 1: Mookie Betts capped his three-hit night with a walk-off single in the bottom of the ninth against the Blue Jays. The Red Sox came back from a three-run deficit heading to the bottom of the fourth, scoring single runs in the fourth, fifth, eighth and ninth. Joe Kelly struck out 10, Pablo Sandoval drove in three and hit his first home run in Fenway Park. Game 2: Clay Buchholz couldn't protect a four-run lead and didn't make it through the third inning, giving up five runs on six hits (all but one in the third inning). The bullpen couldn't keep Boston in the game, giving up another six runs. Pablo Sandoval had a four-hit night, but no RBI, Hanley Ramírez hit his 200th career home run, leading the league in home runs with nine, tied with Nelson Cruz. Anthony Varvaro was designated for assignment. Game 3: Rick Porcello gave Boston's roughed up rotation, entering the day with an MLB-worst 6.03 ERA, a seven inning two-hit performance, allowing only one run. Koji Uehara earned his fourth save, striking out the side. Hanley Ramírez finished a strong April, with his tenth home run of the season, still tied with Nelson Cruz for the league lead, tying David Ortiz for the club record for homers before May 1, and bested his personal record in the same time-span, when he hit eight long balls with the Marlins in 2008. The Red Sox finished April with a 12–10 record, their first month over .500 since September 2013.
Red Sox won the series 2–1 (18–17 runs)

Composite line score April

Team	1	2	3	4	5	6	7	8	9	10	16	18	19	R	H	E
Opponent	17	7	20	14	15	17	13	7	5	2	1	1	0	119	201	28
Boston	9	15	24	7	14	8	11	11	10	1	1	1	1	113	190	13

_{*Extra innings without runs are not displayed}

=== May ===
May 1–3, vs. New York (AL)
Game 1: The Red Sox could not give Justin Masterson enough run-support in his 6+-innings, two-runs outing. Allen Craig hit his first home run of the season and Boston fell victim to fan interference in the bottom of the fourth, when a spectator in a Red Sox jacket reached over and deflected a Ryan Hanigan double, which could have scored Xander Bogaerts from first. Hanigan broke his fifth metacarpal bone during the game and was put on the disabled list and top prospect Blake Swihart was called up. Game 2: Wade Miley recovered from his last outing and pitched seven innings, allowing three runs. Dustin Pedroia hit his fifth home run of the season and Blake Swihart had his first major league hit and scored his first run but that was all the offense the Red Sox could muster and fell back to .500 for the first time since April 8. Game 3: Joe Kelly was pulled after 4 2/3 innings and the slide continued for Boston, falling under .500 for the first time this season, when New York scored eight runs before the Red Sox could assemble a five-run bottom of the sixth. Mike Napoli hit his second home run of the season. Dalier Hinojosa made his major league debut, in a hit-less and scoreless outing, despite hitting a batter and giving up three base on balls. With Ryan Hanigan heading to the 60-day disabled list, Boston claimed Luis Jiménez off of waivers from the Brewers and added him to the 25-man roster, sending down Dalier Hinojosa to Pawtucket.
Red Sox lost the series 0–3 (9–15 runs)

May 4–6, vs. Tampa Bay
Game 1: John Farrell lost a managerial challenge with two outs in the top of the first inning: a James Loney double was upheld by umpires, allowing the Rays to score two runs in the frame thanks to subsequent hits from Evan Longoria and David DeJesus. Starter Clay Buchholz then surrendered two more runs in the top of the second as Joey Butler hit a home run with Asdrúbal Cabrera on base. The Rays tacked on one more run in the seventh. Boston's lone run of the game came courtesy of back-to-back triples from Brock Holt and Xander Bogaerts. Tampa Bay starter Jake Odorizzi struck out six batters for the win to continue the Red Sox' May slide. Game 2: Mookie Betts was responsible for all the offense of the game, going deep twice, his first multi-home run game of his career. Rick Porcello pitched seven shutout innings and Koji Uehara earned his fifth save. Game 3: Evan Longoria hit two solo home runs for the Rays and Joey Butler knocked in two runs to take the series for Tampa Bay. Boston's three RBIs included Blake Swihart's first and Mookie Betts' eighteenth of the year, but Justin Masterson's pitching wasn't good enough to make them stand up. The Red Sox designated Edward Mujica for assignment and relieved pitching coach Juan Nieves of his duties.
Red Sox lost the series 1–2 (6–10 runs)

May 8–10, in Toronto
Prior to the series, David Ortiz lost his appeal for a one-game suspension. Game 1: With the bases loaded and nobody out in the top of the fourth, when Aaron Sanchez walked two and hit Allen Craig with a pitch, Boston could not score and were shut out for the first time this season, getting outhit 12 to 2 and outscored by seven. For the last seven games, Boston left 51 runners on base and went 4–52 with runners in scoring position in that same time-span. Matt Barnes replaced Travis Shaw on the active roster and Carl Willis was introduced as the new pitching coach. Game 2: Red Sox pitching allowed eight walks and Toronto took advantage of it. Joe Kelly threw over 60 pitches in the first two innings, loading the bases in both innings but only allowed one run in each. In the bottom of the fourth, Edwin Encarnación drove in two walks with a three-run shot. Dustin Pedroia brought Mookie Betts home on base hit, but that was all the offense the Red Sox had to show for. Game 3: Mike Napoli and Pablo Sandoval both went deep to avoid the sweep. Napoli in the first inning, driving in three, and Sandoval in the fifth, with Hanley Ramírez on base. Clay Buchholz pitched 6 1/3 innings, giving up 3 earned runs on seven hits. Koji Uehara closed the game, his sixth save. Shane Victorino was activated from the disabled list and to make room on the 25-man roster, Luis Jiménez was designated for assignment. After playing the first 31 games against teams from the east, 25 of those games against opponents in their own division, the Red Sox headed west to play the next 27 games against the American League West and the Twins.
Red Sox lost the series 1–2 (7–17 runs)

May 11–13, in Oakland
Game 1: Matt Barnes earned his first major league win, pitching the tenth and eleventh inning in an extra-innings game against the Athletics. Pablo Sandoval went deep in the eleventh, which proved to be the difference in the game. Game 2: Justin Masterson struggled and was pulled after giving up 6 earned runs on 6 hits in 2 1/3 innings. Steven Wright saved the bullpen by eating up the remaining 5 2/3 innings. Facing a struggling opposing pitcher in Drew Pomeranz (0–3 and a 6.57 ERA in his last five starts), the offense was not able to produce. This painted a similar picture when they faced Bud Norris (1–2 and a 17.42 ERA in three starts at that time) on April 26 and Drew Hutchison (1–0 and an 8.88 ERA for his last five starts at that time) on May 9. Game 3: Wade Miley pitched 6 2/3 shutout innings and the bullpen held its end of the bargain. Daniel Nava drove in one run in the second and scored on a throwing error by Marcus Semien in the eighth inning. Justin Masterson was put on the 15-day disabled list and Robbie Ross Jr. was called up from Pawtucket.
Red Sox won the series 2–1 (9–13 runs)

May 14–17, in Seattle
Game 1: Shane Victorino hit his first home run of the season and Mookie Betts drove in the winning run in the top of the ninth with a sacrifice fly, which left fielder Rickie Weeks ultimately dropped. Joe Kelly held Seattle to just one run over 6 1/3 innings. Game 2: A stellar eight-inning, three-hit, one-run outing by Clay Buchholz went for naught, when the offense could provide only one run of support, an RBI triple by Xander Bogaerts. The Mariners walked off in the bottom of the ninth on a Nelson Cruz single. Game 3: Pablo Sandoval and David Ortiz both took Félix Hernández deep for solo shots, Blake Swihart, RBI double, and Brock Holt, RBI groundout, added two more runs to support Rick Porcello's two-run outing, pitching 6 2/3 innings. Game 4: Steven Wright, in his first major league start, allowed three runs over 5 frames but without any run support by the offense. The Red Sox headed back home from the ten-game road trip, and while the struggling pitching stabilized the offense went quiet, scoring only 23 runs in this ten game stretch.
Red Sox split the series 2–2 (7–10 runs)

May 19–21, vs. Texas
Game 1: David Ortiz and Mike Napoli both homered and collected another RBI on a single each to propel the Red Sox past the Rangers. Wade Miley went seven innings and allowed two runs on seven strikeouts, Koji Uehara gave up his first hit and run since his blown save on April 26, a home run by Leonys Martín with nobody out, but earned his tenth save of the season. Game 2: Joe Kelly gave up two runs in seven innings, but that all Texas needed. Boston's lone run came on a long ball by Xander Bogaerts in the bottom of the fifth. Game 3: The Rangers scored early when they plated two runs on a ground out and an error and added a third on a home run by Mitch Moreland. The offense could only produce one run on a David Ortiz ground out. Rusney Castillo got the call-up and Jackie Bradley Jr. was optioned to Triple-A.
Red Sox lost the series 1–2 (6–8 runs)

May 22–24, vs. Los Angeles
Game 1: The Red Sox jumped in front early thanks to a home run by Mike Napoli in the bottom of the second. In the fourth both teams scored twice before Rick Porcello collapsed in the top of the fifth, giving up seven runs on its own and two more runs were charged to reliever Matt Barnes, from which Boston could not recover. Game 2: Mike Napoli went yard twice to back a two-run second major league start by Steven Wright. Xander Bogaerts and Mookie Betts both drove in two. Anthony Varvaro, who was designated for assignment on April 29 and claimed by Cubs on May 3, was returned to Boston and put on the disabled list due to a torn flexor tendon. Shane Victorino was also put on the disabled list. He was replaced by Jeff Bianchi on the active roster. Game 3: Wade Miley held the Angels to just four hits and one run in eight innings. Mike Napoli hit his fourth home run of the series and collected four RBIs, Xander Bogaerts was 4–4 at the plate.
Red Sox won the series 2–1 (19–16 runs)

May 25–27, in Minneapolis
Game 1: The Twins struck early, scoring seven runs in the first two innings, chasing Joe Kelly just after 1 2/3 innings from the game. The bullpen held the Twins scoreless for the remainder of the game but the offense could not overcome the early deficit, scoring only two runs. Game 2: Mike Napoli drove in David Ortiz for Boston's lone run and another strong outing by Clay Buchholz, allowing two runs in 7 1/3 innings, fell by the wayside. The game was 1:21 hours delayed due to rain. Boston acquired Carlos Peguero from the Rangers for cash considerations. Game 3: Rick Porcello dealt two quick innings but gave up three runs in the third and home runs in the fourth and sixth inning. Dustin Pedroia matched his 2014 season total in home runs with seven, with two two-run shots off of Phil Hughes in the third and fifth but was the only provider for runs in this game. Boston was swept for the second time this season and for the first time since 2006 by the Twins.
Red Sox lost the series 0–3 (7–15 runs)

May 28–31, in Arlington

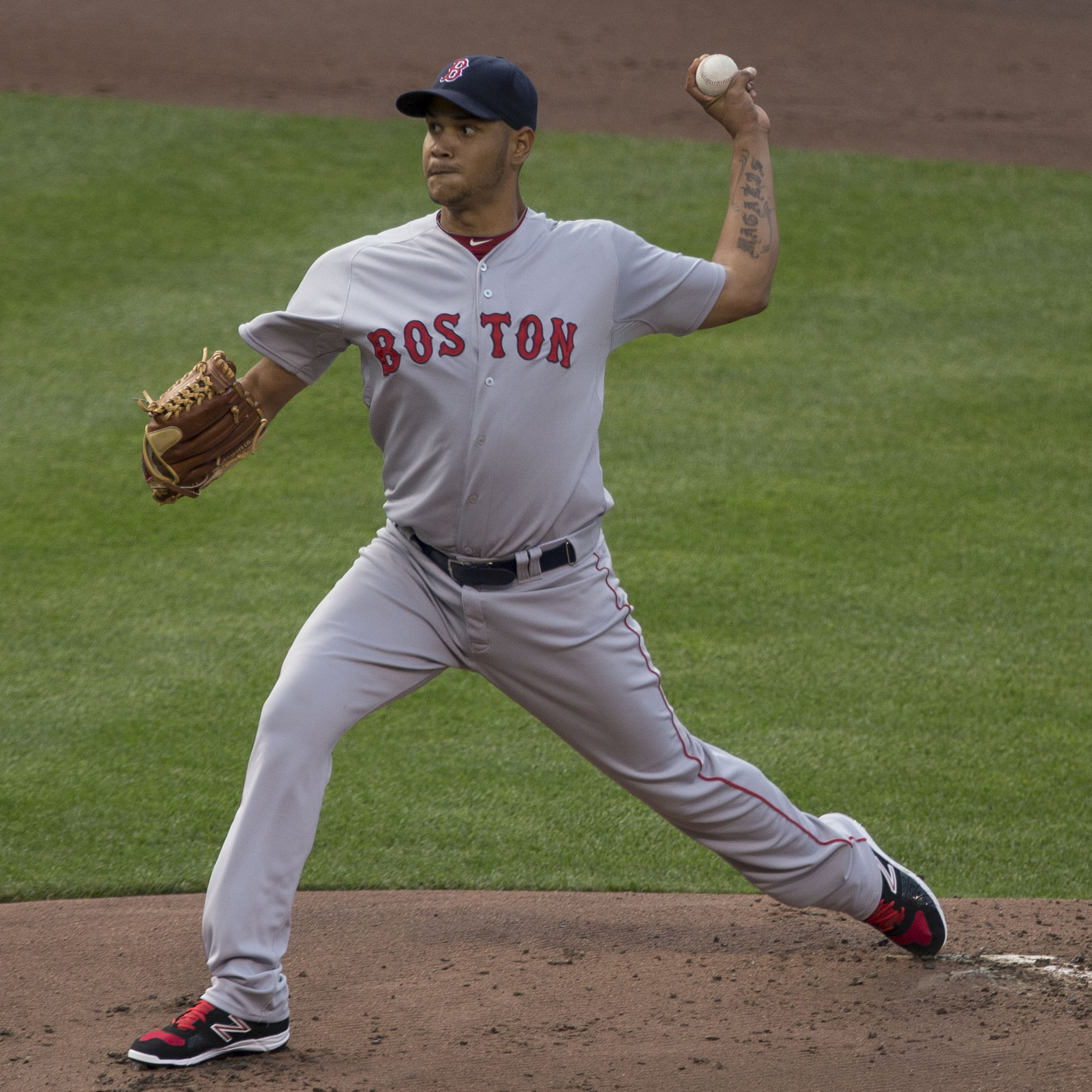
Eduardo Rodríguez made his major league debut May 28 with a 7 2/3 innings, shutout performance.

Prior to the series the Red Sox activated Carlos Peguero to the 25-man roster and called Robbie Ross Jr. and Eduardo Rodríguez up from Pawtucket. Jeff Bianchi was designated for assignment, Heath Hembree was optioned to Triple-A and Daniel Nava was put on the disabled list. Game 1: In his major league debut, Eduardo Rodríguez pitched 7 2/3 shutout innings, striking out seven and giving up only three hits and two walks. Hanley Ramírez hit his first home run since April 29, Blake Swihart drove in two, Rusney Castillo collected his first RBI of the season, and Dustin Pedroia and Mookie Betts both had a three-hit night. Game 2: Steven Wright allowed three runs in 5 2/3 innings but the bullpen could not hold Boston in the game, giving up two runs each in the seventh and in the eighth. Hanley Ramírez homered in the eighth to bring the Red Sox within a run at that time. Game 3: Wade Miley gave up five earned runs in 4 innings and the Red Sox were shut out for the third time this season. Game 4: Koji Uehara was charged with a blown save and the loss, giving up a two-out walk-off double to pinch hitter Josh Hamilton, after Pablo Sandoval committed his second error of the game and let the lead-off hitter reach. Boston pitching gave up only one earned run in the 3–4 loss. The Red Sox only scored 82 runs in the month of May, the worst record in the major leagues.
Red Sox lost the series, 1–3 (12–20 runs)

Composite line score May

Team	1	2	3	4	5	6	7	8	9	11	R	H	E
Opponent	20	15	15	17	18	12	9	11	7	0	124	259	18
Boston	6	10	9	10	11	13	8	13	1	1	82	229	18

_{*Extra innings without runs are not displayed}

=== June ===
June 2–4, vs. Minnesota
Game 1: Clay Buchholz pitched a three-hit, shutout gem through eight innings with eight strikeouts and Koji Uehara closed the game for his first save since May 19. Rusney Castillo drove in the only run of the game. Brandon Workman, who was on the 15-day disabled list since April 3, 2015, was moved to the 60-day disabled list. Game 2: Eduardo Rodríguez gave up only two hits and one run in seven innings of work, striking out seven Twins in the process. Dustin Pedroia scored two runs on four hits, Xander Bogaerts drove in two on three hits and Mike Napoli hit a solo shot over the Green Monster. Game 3: In game two of the day-night doubleheader, Rick Porcello allowed two runs on four hits through the first two innings and then settled in and limited Minnesota to one additional hit for the next six innings. Twins pitching held the Red Sox to only two hits in the shutout, striking out 11 batters. The Red Sox acquired Alejandro De Aza from the Orioles for Double-A prospect Joe Gunkel and cash considerations. To make room in the roster, Carlos Peguero was designated for assignment. Game 4: Steven Wright could not protect a four-run lead heading into the fifth, giving up a three-run home run to Torii Hunter in the fifth and another run in the sixth. The Twins put the game out of reach for the Red Sox with a four-run ninth, all charged to Koji Uehara without recording an out. Blake Swihart hit his first career home run and Dustin Pedroia also went deep, both one-run shots.
Red Sox split the series 2–2 (11–13 runs)

June 5–7, vs. Oakland
Game 1: A woman seated in the front rows of Fenway Park was rushed to Beth Israel Deaconess Medical Center after being struck in the head by a broken bat used by the Athletics' Brett Lawrie in the second inning of the series opener. Despite the somber interruption of the game, the Red Sox earned a 4–2 victory on the strength of runs scored in the first, third, fourth, and fifth inning. Brock Holt drove in two runs, and Mookie Betts and Hanley Ramírez added to the scoring with respective bunt single and sacrifice fly RBIs. Starter Wade Miley struck out six batters across 7 1/3 innings. Game 2: Joe Kelly pitched six innings of one-run ball on four hits and two walks. Hanley Ramírez went deep in the first, driving in Brock Holt, and later scored in the third. Koji Uehara earned the save in a perfect top of the ninth. Boston prematurely won their first season series against a 6+–games opponent of the season. Game 3: The Red Sox could not get to Athletics' starter Kendall Graveman until Rusney Castillo hit his first home run of the season off of him and he was pulled in the bottom of the eighth. The Red Sox ended up sending eleven man to the plate, scoring seven runs, four runs with two outs, against five Oakland pitchers in that inning. With Koji Uehara unavailable, Tommy Layne pitched the ninth earning his first save since 2012. Clay Buchholz went 4 2/3 innings, giving up four runs on ten hits. Steven Wright, pitcher of record, held the Red Sox in the game with a 3 1/3 innings, one-hit shutout performance. This was the first time the Red Sox scored 4 or more runs in 4 or more consecutive games since April 29, the first time since April 11 that they could win three in a row and the first sweep of the season.
Red Sox won the series 3–0 (15–8 runs)

June 9–11, in Baltimore
Game 1: Eduardo Rodríguez gave up three hits and three walks in six innings of shutout ball but received no run-support. The winning run scored in the bottom of the seventh on a wild pitch by Matt Barnes. Game 2: Dustin Pedroia scored both Boston runs on a Brock Holt double and a Mike Napoli force out. Rick Porcello gave up five runs on 10 hits in 5 1/3 innings. Game 3: Boston could not overcome an early four-run deficit after three innings, narrowing the gap to one run three times but eventually fell short and were swept for the third time. David Ortiz hit his seventh home run of the season, after being without a long ball for 76 straight plate appearances. Wade Miley was pulled after four innings, giving up five runs on nine hits and was seen yelling and screaming at manager John Farrell in the dugout before both headed into the clubhouse.
Red Sox lost the series 0–3 (7–12 runs)

June 12–14, vs. Toronto
Game 1: Matt Barnes, Junichi Tazawa and Tommy Layne gave up six straight hits and allowed nine batters to reach base safely, who all scored, without recording an out in the top of the seventh. Toronto sent 12 hitters to the plate that inning and propelled them five runs past the Red Sox, who at one time in the game had an 8–1 lead. In the bottom of the first, Boston sent eleven batters to the plate and scored five times, including back-to-back home runs by Pablo Sandoval and Mookie Betts. Dustin Pedroia chased Drew Hutchison after 2 1/3 innings from the game with a three-run shot over the Green Monster. The Red Sox rallied for two more runs, making it the first game in which they scored 10+ runs this season, but eventually fell short. Game 2: After an early four-run deficit, the Red Sox rallied for four runs, including a David Ortiz home run. With the bases loaded and one out in the bottom of the seventh, Boston could not cash in and the game headed into extra innings where Russell Martin put the Blue Jays on top for good. Game 3: Rookie pitcher Eduardo Rodríguez was roughed up, giving up 9 runs, all earned, despite a shaky defense. David Ortiz hit a home run, his first long ball in back-to-back games this season, but the rally fell way short. The Red Sox scored 19 runs this series, tied for second place with the Angels' series in Fenway Park and outscored all but four opponents, yet they were swept in back-to-back series for the first time since August 2014, when they lost four games to the Angels and three games to the Mariners.
Red Sox lost the series 0–3 (19–31 runs)

June 15–18, vs./in Atlanta

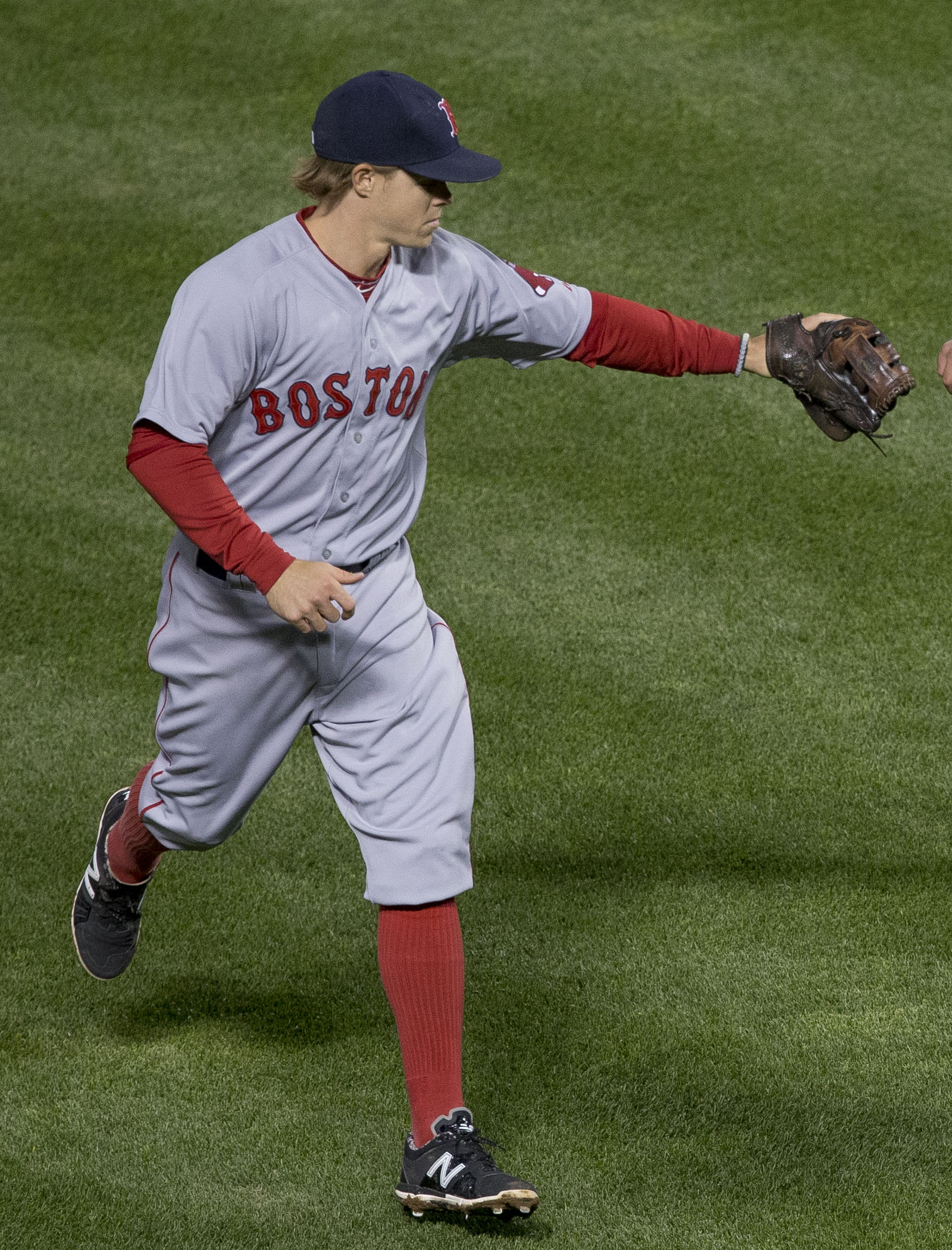
Brock Holt hit for the cycle on June 16. He is the 20th Red Sox player to do so and the first in 19 years.

Game 1: Pablo Sandoval got his 1,000th major league hit with his second double of the night and Xander Bogaerts hit a home run. Rick Porcello gave up four runs in 6 1/3 innings and earned the loss, as the Sox dropped their seventh straight game. Game 2: Brock Holt made history as he became the 20th Red Sox player, and the first in 19 years, to hit for the cycle. Holt doubled to deep left in the first, singled to right in the fifth, homered over the Monster in the seventh, and hit a ringing triple into right center in the eighth to complete the cycle, the first in the majors this year. Mookie Betts and Alejandro De Aza also each had a double and a triple in the Red Sox' 18 hit effort. Wade Miley struck out eight in 6 1/3 innings of work, allowing two runs on five hits to beat the Braves and snap their losing streak. Game 3: The series shifted to Atlanta and both starters left the game without being part of the decision. The Braves' bullpen held the Red Sox to the two runs, including a Mike Napoli home run, that Nick Masset gave up and Junichi Tazawa was charged with the loss, giving up two runs on three hits. Game 4: Clay Buchholz pitched seven innings of two-run ball. Brock Holt reached base safely and scored three times. The game was rain delayed for 45 minutes.
Red Sox split the series 2–2 (18–15 runs)

June 19–21, in Kansas City
Game 1: The Red Sox offense opened the scoring early, sending nine batters to the plate and scoring five runs on five hits in the second inning. Mookie Betts collected four hits and his 30th RBI of the season, Hanley Ramírez with a solo shot in the fifth. Eduardo Rodríguez recovered from his last start against the Jays, and allowed only one run in 6 1/3 innings of work. Game 2: Rick Porcello gave up five runs in the fifth inning, surrendering a 4–1 lead, from which the Red Sox could not recover. Mookie Betts hit a first inning lead-off home run. David Ortiz was ejected in the seventh inning, after he flipped his bat on a single. Game 3: Wade Miley pitched six shutout innings. Boston collected 16 hits, 13 of them extra base hits, three home runs (Hanley Ramírez, David Ortiz and Mookie Betts), eight doubles (Brock Holt and Dustin Pedroia with two each, Xander Bogaerts with three) and two triples (Betts and Holt). Bogaerts collected three RBIs and Betts fell one single short of the cycle. This was the first game of the season the Red Sox scored more than 10 runs.
Red Sox won the series 2–1 (24–12 runs)

June 23–25, vs. Baltimore
Prior to the series, the Red Sox activated Justin Masterson from the disabled list to pitch out of the bullpen, and activated Erik Kratz, who was claimed off of Waivers from the Royals during the series in Kansas City. Rusney Castillo and Steven Wright were sent to Triple-A Pawtucket, to make room in the active roster. Game 1: The O's struck early, scoring four runs in the second, and added insurance in the fourth and sixth. Behind three runs in the ninth, Boston brought the tying run to the plate but eventually fell short, scoring only once. Pablo Sandoval, after struggling from the end of May until the beginning of June, where he only hit .133 in 12 games, had a three-hit night and has hit .452 in his last eleven games only behind Mookie Betts who hit over .500 over the same span and .538 for his last ten games. Mike Napoli sported a golden sombrero and fell under the Mendoza line for the season. Game 2: Baltimore struck first in the sixth but the Red Sox answered with a five runs in their half of the same inning. That was all the offense both teams could put together. Clay Buchholz went seven innings and allowed only one run, Junichi Tazawa and Koji Uehara pitched a perfect eighth and ninth, respectively. David Ortiz went deep and Boston pitching struck out 11 Orioles batters. Dustin Pedroia left the game and was put on the 15-day disabled list. In a series of roster moves, Erik Kratz was designated for assignment, Joe Kelly was optioned to Pawtucket, putting Justin Masterson back in the rotation, and Jackie Bradley Jr. got the call-up among three others. Game 3: Eduardo Rodríguez allowed six runs in the top of the fourth and was pulled after 3 2/3 innings. Five Boston players had a two-hit night, including Alejandro De Aza who hit his first home run in the Red Sox uniform. Trailing by two runs, the Red Sox, after a lead-off single by Jackie Bradley Jr., brought the tying run to the plate but could not overcome the deficit.
Red Sox lost the series 1–2 (15–15 runs)

June 26–28, in St. Petersburg
Game 1: After six straight losses, Rick Porcello gave up a two-run lead in the sixth and left the game with a no decision. Brock Holt drove in the winning run in the top of the tenth in Mookie Betts, who doubled to lead off the tenth, and Koji Uehara closed out the game. Mike Napoli walked three times and scored twice. Game 2: Boston was limited to one hit off of Rays' starter Matt Andriese through six innings. In the eighth, Alejandro De Aza took reliever Kevin Jepsen deep, only the second hit of the night. Brock Holt added a third hit, with two outs in the ninth. Wade Miley gave up two runs in 6 1/3 innings. Game 3: Justin Masterson gave up one unearned run in five innings of work, in his first start since coming off the disabled list. Three home runs by Pablo Sandoval, Alejandro De Aza and David Ortiz, put the Red Sox on top and the bullpen, despite giving up two runs, held on to the lead. Deven Marrero made his major league debut after Mike Napoli got ejected in the second inning for arguing balls and strikes.
Red Sox won the series 2–1 (10–10 runs)

June 29 – July 2, in Toronto
Game 1: Clay Buchholz pitched eight innings of one-run ball, Mookie Betts scored twice and Xander Bogaerts drove in two. Game 2: Marco Estrada was chased from the game after 2 1/3 innings, allowing four Boston runs, two of them earned. The two unearned runs scored in the first inning without the benefit of a hit when Estrada walked Mike Napoli and Alejandro De Aza with the bases loaded, latter on four pitches. Jackie Bradley Jr. hit his first home run since May 31, 2014 and David Ortiz finished June with his seventh long ball, after only going deep six times in all of April and May. Eduardo Rodríguez again bounced back after being roughed up in his previous outing, giving up only four hits and one run in six innings. The Red Sox finished the month of June with an even record of 14–14, after a promising start of 5–2, but immediately followed by a seven-game losing streak.

Composite line score June

Team	1	2	3	4	5	6	7	8	9	10	11	R	H	E
Opponent	1	18	5	23	20	13	25	3	11	0	1	120	254	13
Boston	14	14	14	19	18	19	8	15	4	1	0	126	267	14

=== July ===
June 29 – July 2, in Toronto cont.
Game 3: Toronto's offense came to live, scoring seven runs on seven hits off of Rick Porcello, who was pulled after two innings. Robbie Ross Jr. and Jonathan Aro saved the bullpen, by pitching 3 innings each but giving up four more runs. Mookie Betts' home run was one of only two runs by the Red Sox offense. Game 4: The first eight Red Sox hitter reached safely, including back-to-back home runs by David Ortiz and Hanley Ramírez. Ryan Hanigan, who returned from the disabled list and started his first game since May 1, was the first out and Mookie Betts was called out on runner's interference on a batted ball by Brock Holt, that deflected off of reliever Liam Hendriks, who entered the game after Matt Boyd could not get an out from the seven batters he faced. The Red Sox scored 12 times, eight times in the first inning on 12 batters they sent to the plate, on a season high 19 hits. Xander Bogaerts and Brock Holt both hit safely four times, Alejandro De Aza and Mookie Betts three times. Wade Miley gave up four runs on seven hits and seven walks in five innings.
Red Sox won the series 3–1 (21–21 runs)

July 3–5, vs. Houston
Game 1: Justin Masterson could not get through the fourth inning, allowing five straight two-out hits and five runs in that inning. Boston recovered and could always tie the game when Houston jumped in front. In extra innings, rookie Noé Ramirez allowed four runs, two of them earned, and the Red Sox could not answer. Game 2: Clay Buchholz pitched a one-run, six-hit complete game, the first complete game by Boston pitching in the season. Shane Victorino in his return from the disabled list, collected two hits and two runs. Game 3: Alexi Ogando gave up a two-run lead in the top of the seventh, allowing three runs but Hanley Ramírez put the Red Sox on top for good with a two-run shot over the Green Monster, scoring David Ortiz, who drew an 11-pitch walk. Ortiz started the game at first base for the first time in an American League ballpark since August 5, 2006 and the first time at Fenway Park since July 16, 2005. Mike Napoli replaced him in the top of the eighth but no putout was recorded by a first baseman for the first time in the 17,867 games in franchise history. Boston pitching struck out 14, eight by starter Eduardo Rodríguez who went five innings and allowed one run.
Red Sox won the series 2–1 (19–17 runs)

July 7–8, vs. Miami
Game 1: Xander Bogaerts drove in three in the bottom of the seventh with a bases-clearing, two out single, to propel the Red Sox over the Marlins. Wade Miley gave up three runs in 6 2/3 innings and struck out nine along the way. Game 2: Rick Porcello won this first outing since May 16 against the Mariners, Koji Uehara earned his third straight save and the Red Sox, for the first time in the season, won four games in a row, the last team in the majors to do so. David Ortiz homered for his 15th of the season. Boston won four series in a row for the first time since September 2013.
Red Sox won the series 2–0 (10–6 runs)

July 10–12, vs. New York (AL)
Game 1: Clay Buchholz was charged with the loss after four straight wins. He was pulled from the game after 3 1/3 innings due to an injury and was placed on the 15-day disabled list. With Robbie Ross Jr. on the mound, the defense could not convert three ground balls to an infielder into an out, leading to two runs, and Ross walked a batter with the bases loaded. Mookie Betts was the sole provider of the Boston offense with a single home run. Game 2: Eduardo Rodríguez, the youngest Red Sox starter against the Yankees since Roger Clemens on June 12, 1984, allowed two runs, both long balls, in 6 1/3 innings. Hanley Ramírez homered for two runs in the fourth, to put Boston on top, Mookie Betts and Xander Bogaerts added insurance in the seventh with a two-out RBI each. Koji Uehara shut the door, despite giving up a one-out wall-ball double. Game 3: Wade Miley gave up 6 runs in 5 1/3 innings. The two-run rally, which was widened to four in the ninth, fell short despite two errors committed by New York in the bottom of the ninth. The Red Sox headed to the All-Star break with a 42–47 record, only two games better than last year.
Red Sox lost the series 1–2 (12–16 runs)

July 17–20, in Anaheim
Game 1: Wade Miley took a no-hitter into the seventh inning but gave up a lead-off double to Kole Calhoun. The Red Sox could not take advantage and in the bottom of the ninth on their second hit of the night, Mike Trout took Koji Uehara deep for the lone run of the game. Game 2: Boston's offense was held to only two hits and were shut out in back-to-back games after scoring in the previous 30 games. Rick Porcello gave up three runs, two of them earned, on four hits. Game 3: The game was postponed on Sunday and rescheduled on Monday as the day game of a day-night doubleheader. Eduardo Rodríguez was pulled after 1 2/3 innings, giving up seven runs, all earned. Noé Ramirez gave up four runs, none earned, in relief. The offense could only muster one run, despite collecting nine hits. Game 4: The Red Sox could not avoid the four-game sweep. Steven Wright gave up six runs in five innings, David Ortiz homered. Boston was swept in a four-game series for the first time since August 21, 2014, when the Angels took four out of four games in Fenway Park.
Red Sox lost the series 0–4 (4–22 runs)

July 21–23, in Houston
Game 1: Brian Johnson made his major league debut, allowing four runs on three hits in 4 1/3 innings and was charged with the loss. Mookie Betts drove in two. Game 2: Joe Kelly made his return from Triple-A Pawtucket and gave up four runs in 5 1/3 innings. The offense was held to two runs, making it only nine runs in the past six games, when the regular season resumed play from the All-Star break. Game 3: Wade Miley gave up only one run on four hits in 6 innings but Alexi Ogando and Junichi Tazawa allowed three runs in the seventh. Boston came back in the eighth only to be walked-off by a Jose Altuve home run off of Craig Breslow in the bottom of the ninth. The Red Sox lost all seven games of the seven-game road trip, the first road trip without a win when they lost six straight in 2012 to close out the season. The eight-game losing streak marks the longest since August 2014, when they lost eight at home.
Red Sox lost the series 0–3 (9–17 runs)

July 24–26, vs. Detroit
Game 1: Rick Porcello and Detroit's Justin Verlander both allowed only one run and the game went into extra innings. Xander Bogaerts drove in Mookie Betts for the first walk-off win since April 27 against the Blue Jays. Game 2: Steven Wright went only 4 1/3 innings and allowed four runs which was enough for Boston's one-run offense. Mookie Betts drove in Blake Swihart who hustled for his first major league triple earlier in the inning. Game 3: On the day of the induction of former Red Sox pitcher Pedro Martínez into the Hall of Fame, David Ortiz collected a career-high seven RBI including two three-run shots in the fifth and in the seventh inning. Eduardo Rodríguez allowed only one run on three hits in seven innings.
Red Sox won the series 2–1 (14–7 runs)

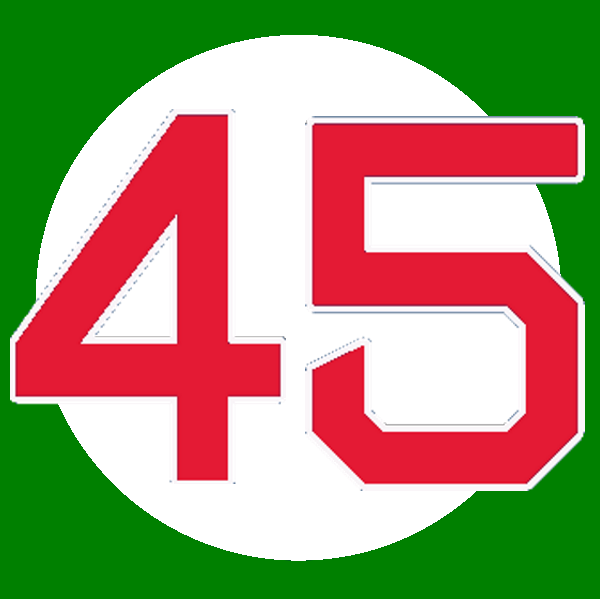
Pedro Martínez's number 45 was retired by the Boston Red Sox in 2015.

July 27–30, vs. Chicago
Game 1: Joe Kelly left the game trailing 5–4 after 3 1/3 innings, four of those runs in the first. Boston turned it around leading 6–5 and 7–6 at the time but the White Sox eventually took the game in an 18 run, 27 hits slugfest from both teams. David Ortiz homered in back-to-back games for the first time since June 13 & 14 against the Blue Jays. Prior to the game the Red Sox announced that Shane Victorino has been traded to the Angels for minor leaguer Josh Rutledge. Game 2: Wade Miley gave up five first inning runs but then settled down until the sixth and was eventually pulled after 5 2/3 innings, after giving up a two-run home run, which Mookie Betts caught but ultimately dropped after falling over the right center field wall into the Red Sox bullpen. Pablo Sandoval went deep in the second inning for two runs. Game 3: The White Sox continued to score in the top of the first inning and added runs in the second and third. Rick Porcello gave up six runs in two innings. Both runs from the Red Sox came off the bat of Mike Napoli, an RBI double in the fifth and a solo shot in the seventh. Game 4: Led by a stellar performance by Steven Wright, two runs in a career high seven innings, the Red Sox avoided the sweep, scoring seven times off of Chris Sale. The White Sox again scored in the first inning but were shut out for the remainder of the game. Wright had his best outing of his career, striking out eight batters. His former best were six in two relief appearances in 2014 for the Red Sox. Boston scored 22 times in the series for a second place tie with the Washington series but also allowed 30 runs which is also the second highest for the season.
Red Sox lost the series 1–3 (22–30 runs)

July 31 – August 2, vs. Tampa Bay
On the day of the trade deadline a lot of rumors spread around the Red Sox including Indians' Carlos Carrasco and Padres' Tyson Ross & Craig Kimbrel. Even a three-way deal between said Padres and the Cubs was reported but never came through. Boston acquired Ryan Cook from the Athletics for a player to be named later. Game 1: Mike Napoli put the Red Sox on top for good with a two-run home run in the bottom of the seventh and Blake Swihart added insurance in the eighth on a wild pitch. Koji Uehara earned his first save since July 11 against the Yankees. Eduardo Rodríguez went five innings and allowed three runs. After a strong start into the month, the Red Sox fell into a slump after the All-Star break and headed into the last two months eight games behind the second wildcard spot.

Composite line score July

Team	1	2	3	4	5	6	7	8	9	10	11	R	H	E
Opponent	25	22	11	18	11	11	18	9	8	4	0	137	243	25
Boston	16	10	12	7	14	16	21	9	5	0	1	111	230	18

=== August ===
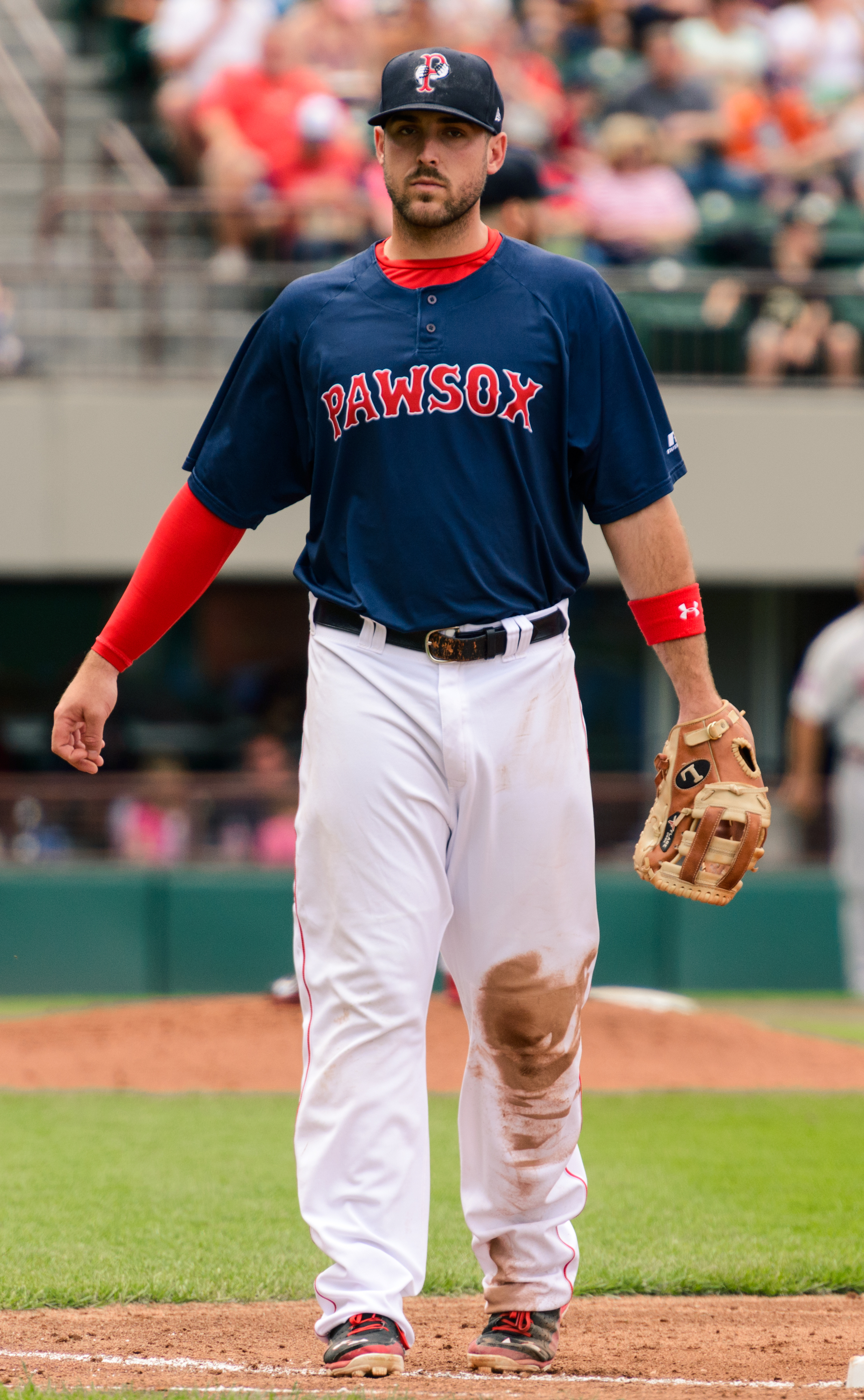
Travis Shaw (pictured in his Pawtucket uniform) hit two home runs, scored five times and drove in three on August 1 against the Rays. He later hit two home runs on August 14 against Seattle again and repeated his four-for-four on August 18 against the Indians.

July 31 – August 2, vs. Tampa Bay cont.
Game 2: Travis Shaw went 4 for 4 with five runs scored and two home runs (including his first major league long ball), a triple shy of the cycle. Joe Kelly was lights out giving up only one hit in the first three innings but then gave up eight hits and five runs in the next two+. Xander Bogaerts, also with four hits, and Rusney Castillo along with Shaw collected three RBIs each. Jean Machi made his Red Sox debut going two innings and earning the save. Both teams connected for 29 hits and 18 runs. Game 3: Junichi Tazawa gave up two runs in the eighth which put the Rays on top and the Red Sox could not come back. Wade Miley went 6 2/3 innings giving up two runs on five hits.
Red Sox won the series 2–1 (21–16 runs)

August 4–6, in New York (AL)
Game 1: Henry Owens made his major league debut and allowed three runs on five hits in five+ innings of work. In the bottom of the seventh the bullpen collapsed and allowed a combined nine runs. This marked the tenth time Red Sox pitching allowed 10 or more runs this season. Game 2: Steven Wright took a shutout in the seventh and exited the game after the eighth with only one run allowed on four hits and struck out nine along the way. Koji Uehara earned the save. Boston's offense was provided by a home run off the bat of David Ortiz in the fourth and an RBI double by Alejandro De Aza, after Mike Napoli reached second base on a throwing error in the second inning. Game 3: Red Sox could only score once against struggling New York left-hander CC Sabathia. Eduardo Rodríguez allowed two runs in seven innings and was charged with the loss.
Red Sox lost the series 1–2 (6–16 runs)

August 7–9, in Detroit
Game 1: Joe Kelly won back-to-back outings for the first time since the end of last season. Led by a three-hit, three-run performance by Rusney Castillo and a two-run home run from David Ortiz. With the bases loaded, Koji Uehara came into the game in the bottom of the ninth with one out and earned his 25th save of the season. Before the game Mike Napoli was a late scratch from the line-up and was traded to the Rangers for a player to be named later. Game 2: In a back-and-forth game, the Tigers took a one-run lead in the bottom of the seventh and held onto it. David Ortiz homered in back-to-back games. Game 3: Jackie Bradley Jr. drove in a career-high five RBI, including a bases loaded walk and a solo home run. In the top of the second, Boston scored twice without hitting the ball out of the infield. The game was close until Boston broke out in the top of the eighth on a bases clearing triple by Bradley and an RBI single by Brock Holt. Henry Owens went five innings, allowing one run on three hits.
Red Sox won the series 2–1 (20–11 runs)

August 11–12, in Miami
Game 1: The Red Sox could not hang on to their 4–0 lead heading into the bottom of the sixth. Steven Wright gave up two runs in five innings, both runners scored as inherited runners for Ryan Cook in his Red Sox debut in the sixth. With Koji Uehara expected to be out for the season Junichi Tazawa came into the game in the ninth with a one-run lead but gave up the tying run and the game headed into extra innings. Craig Breslow gave up the walk-off run in the bottom of the tenth. Mookie Betts had a three-hit night and collected two RBIs, Jackie Bradley Jr. with two hits and two runs scored. Game 2: Boston tied the game at four in the fifth after being down 4–1. In the sixth inning, the pitching staff completely fell apart and the Marlins scored ten times off of Eduardo Rodríguez, who could not record an out in that inning, Ryan Cook and Robbie Ross Jr. David Ortiz went yard twice, only nine shy of a career 500 long balls.
Red Sox lost the series 0–2 (10–19 runs)

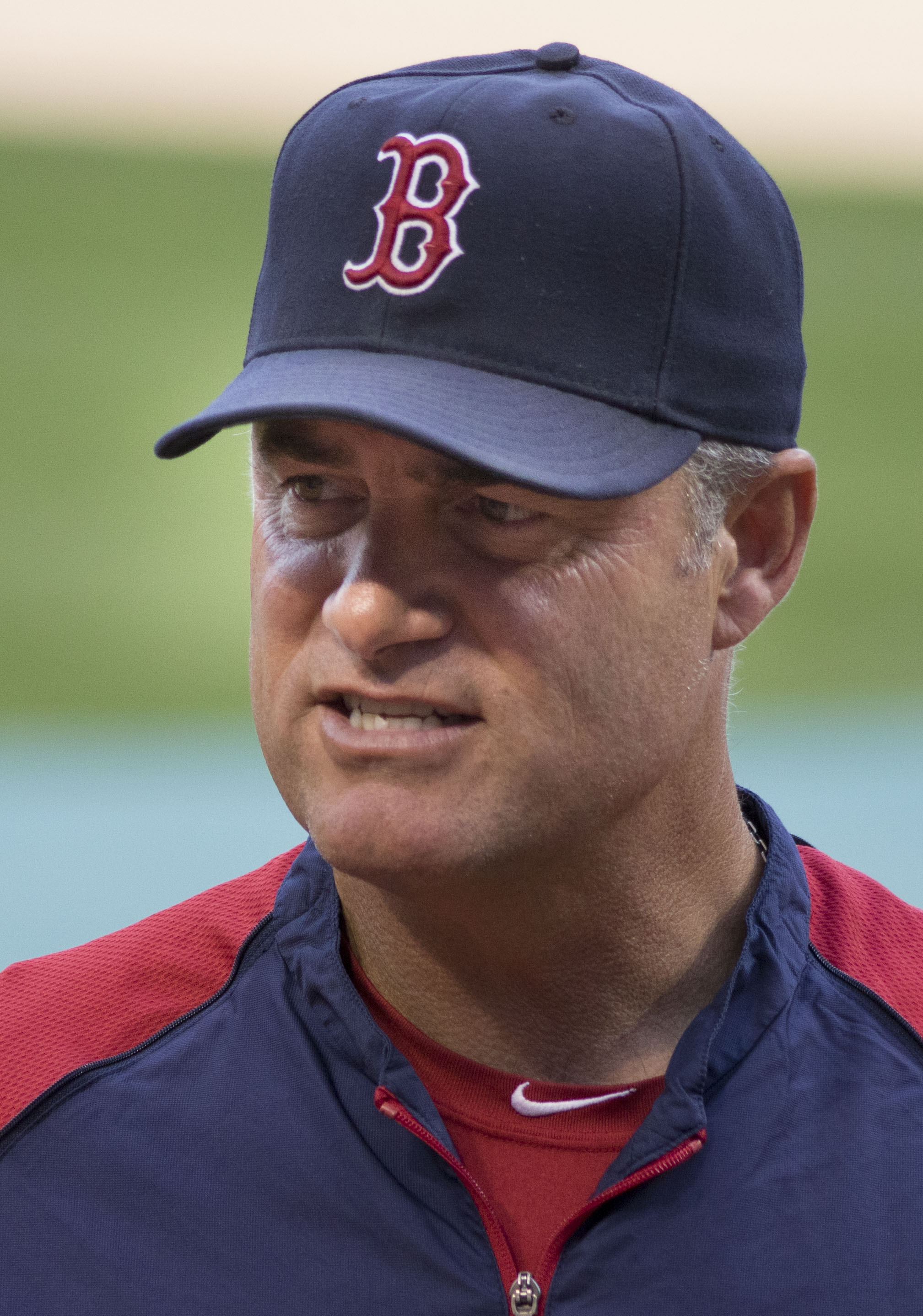
John Farrell was diagnosed with lymphoma and stepped down as manager for the remainder of the season.

August 14–16, vs. Seattle
Prior to the series, manager John Farrell announced that he was diagnosed with lymphoma and bench coach Torey Lovullo was named interim manager for the remainder of the 2015 season. Game 1: The Mariners scored first, which proved to be their only run of the game, and the Red Sox put 15 runs on the board. Travis Shaw had another two home run night. Joe Kelly won his third straight start, allowing only one run on four hits in six innings. Game 2: Heading into the eighth inning, the Red Sox lead 19–2, both teams added another eleven runs in the last 1 1/2 innings, eight by Seattle and three by Boston. Jackie Bradley Jr. topped his career-high five RBIs, from a week earlier, by another two, going yard twice in the effort. Wade Miley allowed only two runs in seven innings. Both teams connected for a combined 39 hits and scored 32 runs. Game 3: The Mariners jumped in front with seven runs after the top of the third inning. Trailing by two in the ninth, the Red Sox put together a two-run rally to tie the game but David Ortiz, representing the winning run, was thrown out at the plate and the game headed into extra innings. After two scoreless innings, Craig Breslow immediately gave up back-to-back hits and loaded the bases on a throwing error. Two runs scored and Boston could not answer.
Red Sox won the series 2–1 (45–21 runs)

August 17–19, vs. Cleveland
Game 1: Boston took an early 1–0 lead, a solo home run by Travis Shaw in the bottom of the third but Matt Barnes gave up five runs in the top of the fourth. The Red Sox could not score again until the ninth, an RBI single by Shaw. Game 2: Eduardo Rodríguez pitched a career-high eight innings, giving up only one run on six hits. Travis Shaw went four-for-four with two runs scored, Mookie Betts drove in three, all came with a bases clearing double in the bottom of the second inning. After the game Dave Dombrowski was named the new president of baseball operations, effective immediately. Shortly after, Ben Cherington announced that he will step down from his position as general manager but will remain in the organization to help Dombrowski with the transition. Game 3: The offense connected for four home runs, in two pairs of back-to-back shots, all charged to Indians's starter Corey Kluber. Joe Kelly won his fourth outing in a row giving up only one unearned run in six innings.
Red Sox won the series 2–1 (17–13 runs)

August 20–23, vs. Kansas City
Game 1: Wade Miley went 7 1/3 innings giving up only one run. Miley was backed by four runs all within the first three innings. Game 2: Blake Swihart had a four-for-four night, four of the career-high 13 hits the Red Sox could get off Royals's starter Johnny Cueto. Henry Owens pitched eight innings, allowing two runs, one earned, on four hits making it four straight outings Red Sox starting pitcher gave up one or less earned runs while going at least six innings. Game 3: Matt Barnes gave up five runs on eight hits in his second career start and the Red Sox rally fell three runs short. Game 4: With a 6–4 lead and two outs in the ninth inning, Junichi Tazawa surrendered three hits and a walk that gave the Royals an 8–6 lead and ultimately the win. Eduardo Rodríguez gave up four runs, two of them earned, in six innings.
Red Sox split the series 2–2 (20–17 runs)

August 24–26, in Chicago
Game 1: Joe Kelly extended his winnings streak to five straight starts, going 7 1/3 innings with 2 runs allowed. Rusney Castillo went three-for-four with a career-high five RBIs, including a three-run shot in the second inning. Game 2: Wade Miley took a 4–2 lead in the seventh but gave up three runs in 2/3 of an inning and was relieved. The Red Sox could not score in the remaining two innings. Earlier this day, Dennis and Callahan cited multiple sources, that Don Orsillo, play-by-play commentator for Red Sox baseball on NESN since 2001, will not return in 2016. He will be replaced by Dave O'Brien, who is currently calling Red Sox games on Boston Red Sox Radio Network. Game 3: Rick Porcello and Chicago's Chris Sale both went seven scoreless innings. Travis Shaw hit a two-run home run in the top of the eighth, giving Porcello the win. Josh Rutledge added insurance in the ninth, driving in Blake Swihart and Junichi Tazawa closed out the game.
Red Sox won the series 2–1 (12–9 runs)

August 28–30, in New York (NL)
Game 1: Tied at three, the game went into extra innings. Boston scored three times in the top of the tenth, including an inside-the-park home run by Blake Swihart. In the bottom of the tenth, Junichi Tazawa quickly got two outs but then walked four consecutive batters, New York's second bases loaded walk of the game, the first off of Alexi Ogando to tie the game in the bottom of the seventh. Craig Breslow was summoned from the bullpen and got the final out with the bases loaded. Game 2: With his sixth straight win, Joe Kelly improved to a 6–0 and 2.68 ERA in six starts in the month of August. Mets pitching struck out 16 Red Sox batters. Jean Machi earned his third save and was named closer for the remainder of the season. Game 3: In a back-and-forth game, the Mets avoided the clean sweep on a two-out RBI single by Michael Cuddyer in the seventh inning. He drove in Daniel Murphy, who stole second base earlier in the same at-bat.
Red Sox won the series 2–1 (13–10 runs)

August 31 – September 2, vs. New York (AL)
Game 1: David Ortiz launched his third home run in the last four games to propel the Red Sox past the Yankees. Eduardo Rodríguez went five innings, allowing two runs, one earned, on seven hits. With 31 games left heading into September and October, Boston sits 7 1/2 games back of the second wildcard spot.

Composite line score August

Team	1	2	3	4	5	6	7	8	9	10	12	R	H	E
Opponent	11	5	9	16	8	30	23	10	14	2	2	130	262	10
Boston	10	28	27	13	11	26	26	12	5	3	0	161	287	18

_{*Extra innings without runs are not displayed}

=== September–October ===
August 31 – September 2, vs. New York (AL) cont.
Game 2: Travis Shaw committed his first error of the season which proved to be costly. Despite Rick Porcello striking out thirteen Yankees batters and allowing only one earned run in eight innings, he was charged with the loss. Former mentioned error extended the fifth inning and allowed two runners to score. The only Red Sox run was driven in by Pablo Sandoval who plated Jackie Bradley Jr. Game 3: Henry Owens could not get through the second inning, giving up seven runs. The bullpen combined allowed an additional six runs and the Red Sox rally, scoring in all innings starting from the sixth, fell five runs short. Boston lost their first series since August 11–12, when they dropped both games in Miami.
Red Sox lost the series 1–2 (13–19 runs)

September 4–6, vs. Philadelphia
Game 1: Joe Kelly extended his winning streak to seven, allowing two runs over six innings. In the top of the ninth, with a 7–2 lead, Jean Machi allowed three runs after getting two quick outs and he was replaced by Robbie Ross Jr. for his first career save. Game 2: Wade Miley pitched a complete game, the second complete game by Boston pitching this season. In the fourth inning, the Red Sox offense put an eight spot on the board, sending eleven batters to the plate. David Ortiz homered for the fourth time in the last eight games and Xander Bogaerts hit a little league grand slam on a bases clearing double and a throwing error by second baseman César Hernández. Ortiz passed Ted Williams for the club record in 30 home runs-seasons with nine, Williams had eight. Game 3: David Ortiz went deep in back-to-back games for the second time within a week but left the game early due to right calf tightness. Eduardo Rodríguez, who has struggled in day games in the past (9.27 ERA in seven games; 1.68 ERA in ten night games) allowed only one run in seven winnings. The Red Sox have swept the second three-game series of the season, the first back in June against the Athletics.
Red Sox won the series 3–0 (22–9 runs)

September 7–9, vs. Toronto
Game 1: On Labor Day, all nine Red Sox starting batters hit safely at least once for a combined 17 hits with Jackie Bradley Jr. going four-for-four with four RBIs, including a two-run shot. Travis Shaw had the second home run of the game, also for two runs. Rick Porcello went 7 1/3 innings, giving up four runs, three of them earned and the Red Sox left fifth place in the AL East for the first time since June 9, tied with the Orioles for fourth place. Game 2: Dustin Pedroia returned to the Red Sox line-up for the first time since July 22. Tied at one since the second inning, the game went into extra innings. Alexi Ogando gave up four runs in the top of the tenth, one on a balk and Boston came up empty in their half. Game 3: With two outs in the third inning, Mookie Betts went deep, which was initially ruled a double but after an umpire review the call on the field was overturned, Dustin Pedroia and Xander Bogaerts both singled and David Ortiz launched his 498th career-home run. Red Sox added two more in the fourth and four in the fifth and took two games from the AL East leading Blue Jays. Joe Kelly became the first Red Sox pitcher to win eight straight games since Pedro Martínez in 1999.
Red Sox won the series 2–1 (22–13 runs)

September 11–13, in St. Petersburg

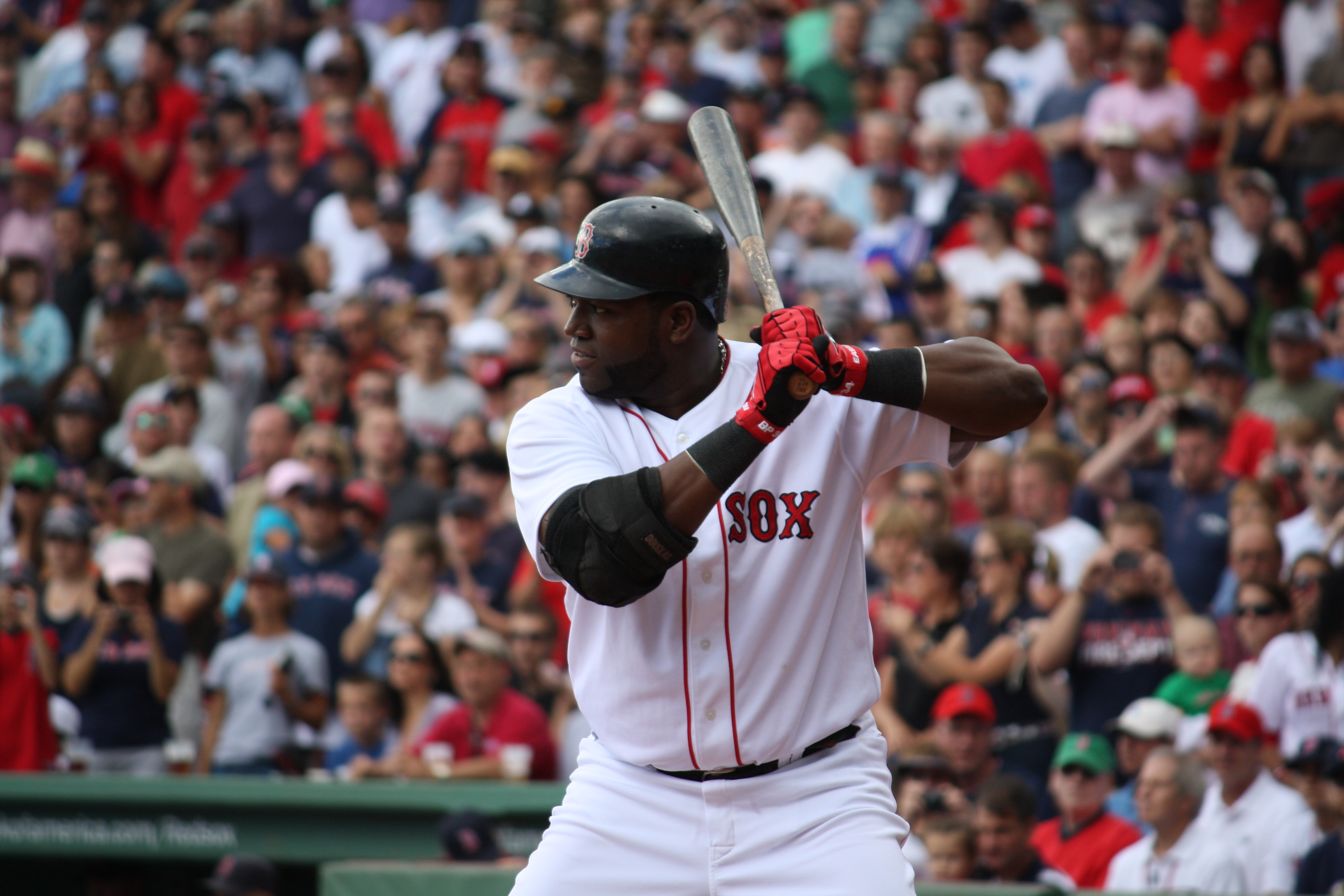
David Ortiz became the 27th major league player to reach 500 home runs.

Game 1: Junichi Tazawa surrendered a one-run lead and allowed five runs in the bottom of the eighth. Wade Miley allowed three runs in the first inning but then settled down and allowed only four base runners over the following six innings. Game 2: In his 50th multi-home run game, all two-home run games, of the career, David Ortiz hit his 500th home run. He went three-for-three before he was pinch ran for by Allen Craig. Mookie Betts, Dustin Pedroia and Travis Shaw also participated in a Red Sox home run derby. The Rays added two long ball themselves, one of them scoring former Red Sox player Daniel Nava. Rick Porcello went seven innings, giving up three runs on five hits. Game 3: With the 14th hit of the game, the Red Sox pushed across the only two runs of the game in the top of the 13th inning. Rich Hill made his season debut and his first start since July 27, 2009 with the Orioles. He pitched seven innings of one-hit ball, striking out ten batters in the process. The two runs were driven in by Rusney Castillo, one of four consecutive hits off of Rays' reliever Enny Romero. Rays pitching struck out 19 Red Sox batters.
Red Sox won the series 2–1 (16–12 runs)

September 14–16, in Baltimore
Game 1: Eduardo Rodríguez gave up only one run, but that was enough to be charged with the loss. Kevin Gausman held the Red Sox to two hits and Baltimore's pitching shut-out the Red Sox offense. Game 2: Travis Shaw tied the game in the eighth, which ultimately sent the game into extra innings. In the 13th inning Jonathan Aro walked the leadoff hitter and allowed a hit to the next. Robbie Ross Jr. was summoned from the bullpen but gave up the walk-off base hit to the first batter he faced. Joe Kelly's winning streak came to an end, giving up four runs, three earned, on five hits in 2 1/3 innings. He left the game with an injury. Game 3: Henry Owens bounced back from his last outing with a six-hit, shutout performance over 7 2/3 innings. Boston scored ten times and David Ortiz set a club record with his sixth 35 home run season for the Red Sox.
Red Sox lost the series 1–2 (15–9 runs)

September 18–20, in Toronto
Game 1: Toronto pitching held the Red Sox to just one run while Rick Porcello gave up six, five earned, in his six innings of work. Game 2: Being down 2–4 to start the ninth inning, Boston scored five times, two runs on account of a Jackie Bradley Jr. home run. Robbie Ross Jr. earned the save, despite giving up two runs in the bottom of the ninth. Wade Miley went 6 2/3 innings, giving up two runs on three hits, but walking five. Game 3: Toronto quickly scored three times in the second inning, but that was all they got. Rich Hill earned his first win since July 14, 2013 as a member of the Indians and repeated his ten strikeout outing, the first Red Sox pitcher to have back-to-back 10+ strikeouts in their first two starts for the club. Pablo Sandoval scored the winning run on a Jackie Bradley Jr. sacrifice fly in the eighth.
Red Sox won the series 2–1 (12–15 runs)

September 21–24, vs. Tampa Bay
Game 1: In a back-and-forth game the Red Sox were up by one coming into the eighth but Tommy Layne and Alexi Ogando gave up three runs before Jean Machi could stop the bleeding. After two quick outs in the bottom of the inning, Jackie Bradley Jr. got hit by a pitch, Mookie Betts and Dustin Pedroia singled and Xander Bogaerts hit his first career-grand slam. Robbie Ross Jr. allowed one run but earned the save in the ninth. The Red Sox claimed sole possession of fourth place for the first time since May 28. Game 2: The Red Sox could not capitalize on a two-run first inning and fell back to fifth place. Henry Owens gave up four runs in 7 1/3 innings. Game 3: The game went scoreless for six innings but then the Rays' scored six times in the next three innings. In the bottom of the ninth, with two outs, the Red Sox could only get two runs back. Rick Porcello went 7+ innings, giving up three runs, two earned, on eleven hits and striking out eight. Game 4: Like in game two of the series, the Red Sox took an early 2–0 lead but could not profit off of it. David Ortiz collected two more RBI, which extended his club record to his ninth season with 30+ home runs and 100+ RBI and surpassed Ted Williams in 100+ RBI seasons for the Red Sox, also at nine. Wade Miley pitched five scoreless innings, but then gave up four runs in the next 1 1/3. Boston has lost all season series against AL East rivals, except the division leading Blue Jays.
Red Sox lost the series 1–3 (14–22 runs)

September 25–27, vs. Baltimore

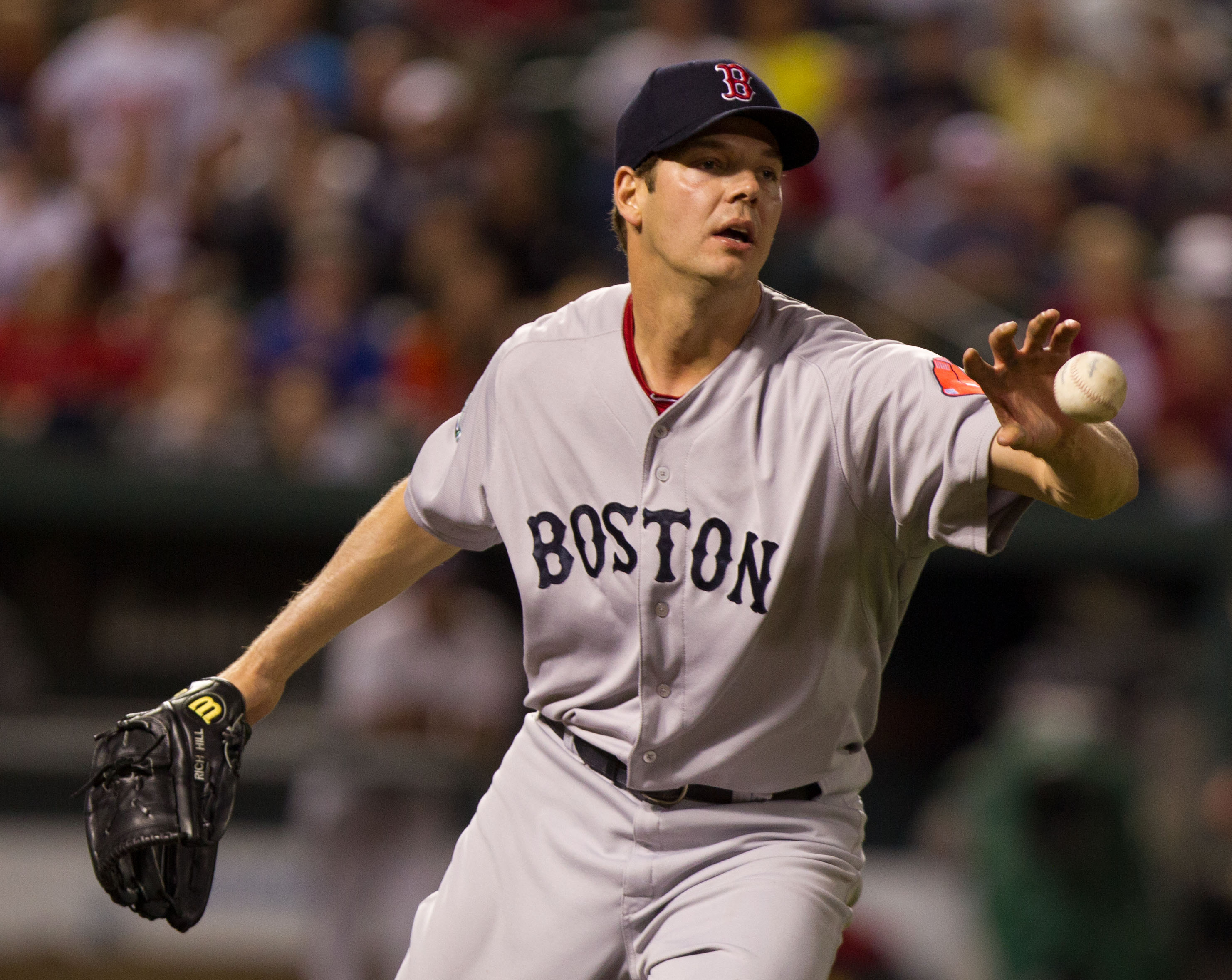
Rich Hill is the first AL pitcher in 100 years to record 10+ strikeouts in each of his first three starts for one club.

Game 1: Rich Hill pitched a complete game, two hit-shutout and became the first AL pitcher in 100 years to strike out 10+ batters in each of their first three starts for a ballclub. Mookie Betts preserved the shutout in the ninth inning with a leaping grab over the bullpen wall. David Ortiz hit three doubles, only his second three-double baggers game of his career. Game 2: The Red Sox shutout the Orioles in a seven pitchers bullpen start. Baltimore committed three costly errors with four Boston runs scoring directly on those miscued plays. This was the first back-to-back shutout since April 23 & 24, 2011 in Anaheim. Game 3: For the first time since September 19–21, 1958 against the Senators, the Red Sox completed a three-game shutout. The two Red Sox runs scored on a wild pitch and a home run by Blake Swihart. Henry Owens allowed three hits in 7 2/3 innings on the final home game of the season.
Red Sox won the series 3–0 (17–0 runs)

September 28 – October 1, in New York (AL)
Game 1: Eduardo Rodríguez pitched one-run ball over six innings and was backed with three shots by Travis Shaw, Jackie Bradley Jr., for two runs each, and Deven Marrero. With the Astros win the same night, the Red Sox were officially eliminated from postseason contention. Game 2: Both teams fired opening salvos in the first inning with Boston staying on top by two runs. Rick Porcello settled down after this and pitched another seven scoreless innings while the Red Sox pushed another four runs across the plate over the course of the game. Blake Swihart had first career-multi-home run game and Deven Marrero hit his first long ball of his career. Game 3: After taking an early 4–1 lead in the third, New York took the lead in sixth only to have it tied up again at five on account of a Mookie Betts home run in the seventh. The game went into extra innings and the Red Sox scored four times in the eleventh inning, two runs off the bat of Mookie Betts with a two-run shot. Boston extended their winning streak to six games. Game 4: The Red Sox could not sweep New York and were held to just one run. Rich Hill gave up two runs and ended his 10+ strikeout streak at three.
Red Sox won the series 3–1 (25–14 runs)

October 2–4, in Cleveland
Game 1: David Ortiz hit his 37th home run of the season and collected the only two RBI. Henry Owens allowed seven runs over 4 1/3 innings. Game 2: Craig Breslow gave up two runs in 5 1/3 innings, but those were all the runs the Indians needed. Boston was shut out for the ninth time this season on a three-hit, eight-inning performance by Corey Kluber and the Red Sox clinched a last-place finish in the AL East for the third time in four years. Game 3: In the final game of the 2015 season, the Red Sox took an early 1–0 lead but that was all they got. Cleveland scored three times in the second and third to sweep the Red Sox for the eighth time of the season. Boston scored a season-low three runs in a single series. This was the last game in the Red Sox broadcasting booth for play-play announcer Don Orsillo.
Red Sox lost the series 0–3 (3–13 runs)

Composite line score September/October

Team	1	2	3	4	5	6	7	8	9	10	11	13	R	H	E
Opponent	14	16	15	7	16	10	6	24	10	4	0	1	123	267	13
Boston	23	7	16	23	18	14	18	20	10	0	4	2	155	294	16

_{*Extra innings without runs are not displayed}

== Season standings ==
=== American League East ===
AL East
Team	W	L	Pct.	GB	Home	Road
Toronto Blue Jays	93	69	.574	—	53‍–‍28	40‍–‍41
New York Yankees	87	75	.537	6	45‍–‍36	42‍–‍39
Baltimore Orioles	81	81	.500	12	47‍–‍31	34‍–‍50
Tampa Bay Rays	80	82	.494	13	42‍–‍42	38‍–‍40
Boston Red Sox	78	84	.481	15	43‍–‍38	35‍–‍46

=== American League Division Leaders and Wild Card ===
Division leaders
Team	W	L	Pct.
Kansas City Royals	95	67	.586
Toronto Blue Jays	93	69	.574
Texas Rangers	88	74	.543

Wild Card teams (Top 2 teams qualify for postseason)
Team	W	L	Pct.	GB
New York Yankees	87	75	.537	+1
Houston Astros	86	76	.531	—
Los Angeles Angels	85	77	.525	1
Minnesota Twins	83	79	.512	3
Cleveland Indians	81	80	.503	4½
Baltimore Orioles	81	81	.500	5
Tampa Bay Rays	80	82	.494	6
Boston Red Sox	78	84	.481	8
Chicago White Sox	76	86	.469	10
Seattle Mariners	76	86	.469	10
Detroit Tigers	74	87	.460	11½
Oakland Athletics	68	94	.420	18

=== Record against opponents ===
2015 American League record Source: MLB Standings Grid – 2015
Team	BAL	BOS	CWS	CLE	DET	HOU	KC	LAA	MIN	NYY	OAK	SEA	TB	TEX	TOR	NL
Baltimore	—	11–8	3–3	5–1	4–3	3–4	3–4	2–4	0–7	10–9	6–1	3–3	10–9	1–6	8–11	12–8
Boston	8–11	—	3–4	2–4	4–2	2–4	4–3	2–5	2–5	8–11	5–1	4–3	9–10	2–5	10–9	13–7
Chicago	3–3	4–3	—	10–9	9–10	5–1	7–12	4–3	6–13	2–5	5–2	4–3	1–5	3–3	4–3	9–11
Cleveland	1–5	4–2	9–10	—	7–11	5–2	9–10	4–2	7–12	5–2	3–4	4–3	5–2	3–3	3–4	12–8
Detroit	3–4	2–4	10–9	11–7	—	3–4	9–10	1–6	11–8	2–5	2–4	4–3	3–3	2–5	2–4	9–11
Houston	4–3	4–2	1–5	2–5	4–3	—	4–2	10–9	3–3	4–3	10–9	12–7	2–5	6–13	4–3	16–4
Kansas City	4–3	3–4	12–7	10–9	10–9	2–4	—	6–1	12–7	2–4	5–1	4–2	6–1	3–4	3–4	13–7
Los Angeles	4–2	5–2	3–4	2–4	6–1	9–10	1–6	—	5–2	2–4	11–8	12–7	3–3	12–7	2–5	8–12
Minnesota	7–0	5–2	13–6	12–7	8–11	3–3	7–12	2–5	—	1–5	4–3	4–3	4–2	3–3	2–5	8–12
New York	9–10	11–8	5–2	2–5	5–2	3–4	4–2	4–2	5–1	—	3–4	5–1	12–7	2–5	6–13	11–9
Oakland	1–6	1–5	2–5	4–3	4–2	9–10	1–5	8–11	3–4	4–3	—	6–13	3–4	10–9	1–5	11–9
Seattle	3–3	3–4	3–4	3–4	3–4	7–12	2–4	7–12	3–4	1–5	13–6	—	4–3	12–7	4–2	8–12
Tampa Bay	9–10	10–9	5–1	2–5	3–3	5–2	1–6	3–3	2–4	7–12	4–3	3–4	—	2–5	10–9	14–6
Texas	6–1	5–2	3–3	3–3	5–2	13–6	4–3	7–12	3–3	5–2	9–10	7–12	5–2	—	2–4	11–9
Toronto	11–8	9–10	3–4	4–3	4–2	3–4	4–3	5–2	5–2	13–6	5–1	2–4	9–10	4–2	—	12–8

Red Sox vs. National League East
Team	ATL	MIA	NYM	PHI	WSH
Boston	2–2	2–2	2–1	5–1	2–1

== Roster ==
2015 Boston Red Sox
Roster
Pitchers: 65 Jonathan Aro; 68 Matt Barnes; 32 Craig Breslow; 11 Clay Buchholz; 46 Ryan Cook; 37 Heath Hembree; 62 Rich Hill; 94 Dalier Hinojosa; 61 Brian Johnson; 56 Joe Kelly; 59 Tommy Layne; 64 Jean Machi; 63 Justin Masterson; 70 Román Méndez; 20 Wade Miley; 54 Edward Mujica; 41 Alexi Ogando; 60 Henry Owens; 22 Rick Porcello; 66 Noé Ramirez; 52 Eduardo Rodríguez; 28 Robbie Ross; 36 Junichi Tazawa; 19 Koji Uehara; 46 Anthony Varvaro; 35 Steven Wright	Catchers: 10 Ryan Hanigan; 3 Sandy León; 23 Blake Swihart; Infielders: 16 Jeff Bianchi; 2 Xander Bogaerts; 29 Garin Cecchini; 26 Brock Holt; 16 Deven Marrero; 12 Mike Napoli; 34 David Ortiz; 15 Dustin Pedroia; 30 Josh Rutledge; 48 Pablo Sandoval; 47 Travis Shaw; 30 Jemile Weeks	Outfielders: 50 Mookie Betts; 25 Jackie Bradley Jr.; 38 Rusney Castillo; 5 Allen Craig; 31 Alejandro De Aza; 29 Daniel Nava; 39 Carlos Peguero; 13 Hanley Ramírez; 18 Shane Victorino; Other batters: 16 Luis Jiménez	Manager: 53 John Farrell; 17 Torey Lovullo (interim); Coaches: 43 Arnie Beyeler (first base); 55 Brian Butterfield (third base); 44 Chili Davis (hitting); 77 Bob Kipper (interim bullpen); 58 Dana LeVangie (bullpen, interim bench); 17 Torey Lovullo (bench); 88 Alex Martinez (bullpen catcher); 47 Juan Nieves (pitching); 57 Vic Rodriguez (assistant hitting); 54 Carl Willis (pitching)

== Game log ==
Past games legend
Red Sox Win	Red Sox Loss	Game postponed	Eliminated from Playoff Race
Boldface text denotes a Red Sox pitcher

Boston Red Sox 2015 Season Game Log — Season Record: (78–84), 5th in AL East
April (12–10)

#	Date	Opponent	Score	Win	Loss	Save	Stadium	Attendance	Record	Box/ Streak
1	April 6	@ Phillies	8–0	**Buchholz** (1–0)	Hamels (0–1)		Citizens Bank Park	45,549	1–0	W1
2	April 8	@ Phillies	2–4	Harang (1–0)	**Porcello** (0–1)	Papelbon (1)	Citizens Bank Park	26,465	1–1	L1
3	April 9	@ Phillies	6–2	**Masterson** (1–0)	Buchanan (0–1)		Citizens Bank Park	23,418	2–1	W1
4	April 10	@ Yankees	6–5 (19)	**Wright** (1–0)	Rogers (0–1)		Yankee Stadium	41,292	3–1	W2
5	April 11	@ Yankees	8–4	**Kelly** (1–0)	Warren (0–1)		Yankee Stadium	46,678	4–1	W3
6	April 12	@ Yankees	4–14	Tanaka (1–1)	**Buchholz** (1–1)		Yankee Stadium	43,019	4–2	L1
7	April 13	Nationals	9–4	**Porcello** (1–1)	Zimmermann (1–1)		**Fenway Park**	37,203	5–2	W1
8	April 14	Nationals	8–7	**Mujica** (1–0)	Treinen (0–1)	**Uehara** (1)	**Fenway Park**	35,258	6–2	W2
9	April 15	Nationals	5–10	Gonzalez (1–1)	**Miley** (0–1)		**Fenway Park**	33,493	6–3	L1
10	April 17	Orioles	3–2	**Uehara** (1–0)	Matusz (0–1)		**Fenway Park**	34,341	7–3	W1
11	April 18	Orioles	1–4	Tillman (2–1)	**Buchholz** (1–2)	Britton (4)	**Fenway Park**	37,655	7–4	L1
12	April 19	Orioles	3–8	González (2–1)	**Porcello** (1–2)		**Fenway Park**	37,761	7–5	L2
13	April 20	Orioles	7–1 (7)	**Masterson** (2–0)	Chen (0–1)		**Fenway Park**	36,829	8–5	W1
14	April 21	@ Rays	1–0	**Miley** (1–1)	Archer (2–2)	**Uehara** (2)	Tropicana Field	14,307	9–5	W2
15	April 22	@ Rays	5–7	Boxberger (1–1)	**Mujica** (1–1)	Geltz (1)	Tropicana Field	12,733	9–6	L1
16	April 23	@ Rays	1–2	Boxberger (2–1)	**Varvaro** (0–1)		Tropicana Field	13,834	9–7	L2
17	April 24	@ Orioles	7–5	**Ogando** (1–0)	Matusz (0–2)	**Uehara** (3)	Camden Yards	37,359	10–7	W1
18	April 25	@ Orioles	4–5 (10)	Matusz (1–2)	**Uehara** (1–1)		Camden Yards	36,757	10–8	L1
19	April 26	@ Orioles	7–18	Norris (1–2)	**Miley** (1–2)		Camden Yards	43,802	10–9	L2
20	April 27	Blue Jays	6–5	**Uehara** (2–1)	Castro (0–2)		**Fenway Park**	34,739	11–9	W1
21	April 28	Blue Jays	8–11	Estrada (1–0)	**Buchholz** (1–3)	Cecil (1)	**Fenway Park**	33,920	11–10	L1
22	April 29	Blue Jays	4–1	**Porcello** (2–2)	Dickey (0–3)	**Uehara** (4)	**Fenway Park**	34,220	12–10	W1

May (10–19)

#	Date	Opponent	Score	Win	Loss	Save	Stadium	Attendance	Record	Box/ Streak
23	May 1	Yankees	2–3	Rogers (1–1)	**Tazawa** (0–1)	Miller (9)	**Fenway Park**	35,444	12–11	L1
24	May 2	Yankees	2–4	Eovaldi (2–0)	**Miley** (1–3)	Betances (1)	**Fenway Park**	36,611	12–12	L2
25	May 3	Yankees	5–8	Warren (2–1)	**Kelly** (1–1)	Miller (10)	**Fenway Park**	33,198	12–13	L3
26	May 4	Rays	1–5	Odorizzi (3–2)	**Buchholz** (1–4)		**Fenway Park**	34,541	12–14	L4
27	May 5	Rays	2–0	**Porcello** (3–2)	Smyly (0–1)	**Uehara** (5)	**Fenway Park**	33,688	13–14	W1
28	May 6	Rays	3–5	Colomé (2–0)	**Masterson** (2–1)	Boxberger (7)	**Fenway Park**	35,060	13–15	L1
29	May 8	@ Blue Jays	0–7	Sanchez (3–2)	**Miley** (1–4)		Rogers Centre	30,430	13–16	L2
30	May 9	@ Blue Jays	1–7	Hutchison (3–0)	**Kelly** (1–2)		Rogers Centre	42,917	13–17	L3
31	May 10	@ Blue Jays	6–3	**Buchholz** (2–4)	Dickey (1–4)	**Uehara** (6)	Rogers Centre	42,419	14–17	W1
32	May 11	@ Athletics	5–4 (11)	**Barnes** (1–0)	Castro (0–1)		O.co Coliseum	19,743	15–17	W2
33	May 12	@ Athletics	2–9	Pomeranz (2–3)	**Masterson** (2–2)		O.co Coliseum	24,605	15–18	L1
34	May 13	@ Athletics	2–0	**Miley** (2–4)	Gray (4–1)	**Uehara** (7)	O.co Coliseum	22,389	16–18	W1
35	May 14	@ Mariners	2–1	**Barnes** (2–0)	Rodney (1–2)	**Uehara** (8)	Safeco Field	20,172	17–18	W2
36	May 15	@ Mariners	1–2	Wilhelmsen (1–0)	**Layne** (0–1)		Safeco Field	39,477	17–19	L1
37	May 16	@ Mariners	4–2	**Porcello** (4–2)	Hernández (6–1)	**Uehara** (9)	Safeco Field	45,055	18–19	W1
38	May 17	@ Mariners	0–5	Paxton (2–2)	**Wright** (1–1)		Safeco Field	39,936	18–20	L1
39	May 19	Rangers	4–3	**Miley** (3–4)	Gallardo (3–6)	**Uehara** (10)	**Fenway Park**	36,580	19–20	W1
40	May 20	Rangers	1–2	Klein (1–0)	**Kelly** (1–3)	Tolleson (1)	**Fenway Park**	35,726	19–21	L1
41	May 21	Rangers	1–3	Rodríguez (2–2)	**Buchholz** (2–5)	Tolleson (2)	**Fenway Park**	34,945	19–22	L2
42	May 22	Angels	5–12	Richards (4–2)	**Porcello** (4–3)		**Fenway Park**	36,150	19–23	L3
43	May 23	Angels	8–3	**Wright** (2–1)	Wilson (2–3)		**Fenway Park**	37,735	20–23	W1
44	May 24	Angels	6–1	**Miley** (4–4)	Santiago (3–3)		**Fenway Park**	37,742	21–23	W2
45	May 25	@ Twins	2–7	Nolasco (5–1)	**Kelly** (1–4)		Target Field	29,472	21–24	L1
46	May 26	@ Twins	1–2	Pelfrey (4–1)	**Buchholz** (2–6)	Perkins (17)	Target Field	23,268	21–25	L2
47	May 27	@ Twins	4–6	Hughes (4–4)	**Porcello** (4–4)	Perkins (18)	Target Field	30,027	21–26	L3
48	May 28	@ Rangers	5–1	**Rodríguez** (1–0)	Martinez (4–1)		Globe Life Park	34,085	22–26	W1
49	May 29	@ Rangers	4–7	Gallardo (5–6)	**Wright** (2–2)	Tolleson (6)	Globe Life Park	38,176	22–27	L1
50	May 30	@ Rangers	0–8	Gonzalez (1–0)	**Miley** (4–5)		Globe Life Park	42,831	22–28	L2
51	May 31	@ Rangers	3–4	Ohlendorf (1–0)	**Uehara** (2–2)		Globe Life Park	32,848	22–29	L3

June (14–14)

#	Date	Opponent	Score	Win	Loss	Save	Stadium	Attendance	Record	Box/ Streak
—	June 1	Twins	**Postponed (rain)** (Makeup date: June 3)							
52	June 2	Twins	1–0	**Buchholz** (3–6)	Pelfrey (4–2)	**Uehara** (11)	**Fenway Park**	32,622	23–29	W1
53	June 3	Twins	6–3	**Rodríguez** (2–0)	Hughes (4–5)		**Fenway Park**	31,704	24–29	W2
54	June 3	Twins	0–2	May (4–3)	**Porcello** (4–5)	Perkins (20)	**Fenway Park**	33,291	24–30	L1
55	June 4	Twins	4–8	Thompson (1–1)	**Uehara** (2–3)		**Fenway Park**	33,615	24–31	L2
56	June 5	Athletics	4–2	**Miley** (5–5)	Kazmir (2–4)	**Uehara** (12)	**Fenway Park**	34,910	25–31	W1
57	June 6	Athletics	4–2	**Kelly** (2–4)	Chavez (2–6)	**Uehara** (13)	**Fenway Park**	36,713	26–31	W2
58	June 7	Athletics	7–4	**Wright** (3–2)	Clippard (0–3)	**Layne** (1)	**Fenway Park**	36,913	27–31	W3
59	June 9	@ Orioles	0–1	González (1–0)	**Barnes** (2–1)	Britton (16)	Camden Yards	28,460	27–32	L1
60	June 10	@ Orioles	2–5	Chen (2–4)	**Porcello** (4–6)	O'Day (2)	Camden Yards	22,201	27–33	L2
61	June 11	@ Orioles	5–6	Tillman (4–7)	**Miley** (5–6)	Britton (17)	Camden Yards	22,840	27–34	L3
62	June 12	Blue Jays	10–13	Delabar (2–2)	**Tazawa** (0–2)	Cecil (3)	**Fenway Park**	37,575	27–35	L4
63	June 13	Blue Jays	4–5 (11)	Loup (2–3)	**Barnes** (2–2)	Cecil (4)	**Fenway Park**	37,158	27–36	L5
64	June 14	Blue Jays	5–13	Estrada (4–3)	**Rodríguez** (2–1)		**Fenway Park**	36,296	27–37	L6
65	June 15	Braves	2–4	Pérez (3–0)	**Porcello** (4–7)	Grilli (17)	**Fenway Park**	34,439	27–38	L7
66	June 16	Braves	9–4	**Miley** (6–6)	Teherán (4–3)		**Fenway Park**	35,662	28–38	W1
67	June 17	@ Braves	2–5	Masset (2–1)	**Tazawa** (0–3)	Grilli (18)	Turner Field	28,902	28–39	L1
68	June 18	@ Braves	5–2	**Buchholz** (4–6)	Miller (5–3)	**Uehara** (14)	Turner Field	31,783	29–39	W1
69	June 19	@ Royals	7–3	**Rodríguez** (3–1)	Pino (0–2)		Kauffman Stadium	38,190	30–39	W2
70	June 20	@ Royals	4–7	Vólquez (7–4)	**Porcello** (4–8)	Holland (13)	Kauffman Stadium	39,115	30–40	L1
71	June 21	@ Royals	13–2	**Miley** (7–6)	Young (6–3)		Kauffman Stadium	37,975	31–40	W1
72	June 23	Orioles	4–6	Jiménez (6–3)	**Kelly** (2–5)	Britton (20)	**Fenway Park**	36,508	31–41	L1
73	June 24	Orioles	5–1	**Buchholz** (5–6)	Norris (2–6)		**Fenway Park**	37,762	32–41	W1
74	June 25	Orioles	6–8	González (6–4)	**Rodríguez** (3–2)	Britton (21)	**Fenway Park**	37,706	32–42	L1
75	June 26	@ Rays	4–3 (10)	**Ogando** (2–0)	Geltz (1–3)	**Uehara** (15)	Tropicana Field	17,508	33–42	W1
76	June 27	@ Rays	1–4	Andriese (3–2)	**Miley** (7–7)		Tropicana Field	23,876	33–43	L1
77	June 28	@ Rays	5–3	**Masterson** (3–2)	Archer (9–5)	**Uehara** (16)	Tropicana Field	21,963	34–43	W1
78	June 29	@ Blue Jays	3–1	**Buchholz** (6–6)	Dickey (3–8)	**Uehara** (17)	Rogers Centre	27,107	35–43	W2
79	June 30	@ Blue Jays	4–3	**Rodríguez** (4–2)	Estrada (5–4)	**Uehara** (18)	Rogers Centre	28,942	36–43	W3

July (10–15)

#	Date	Opponent	Score	Win	Loss	Save	Stadium	Attendance	Record	Box/ Streak
80	July 1	@ Blue Jays	2–11	Buehrle (9–4)	**Porcello** (4–9)		Rogers Centre	45,392	36–44	L1
81	July 2	@ Blue Jays	12–6	**Miley** (8–7)	Boyd (0–2)		Rogers Centre	29,758	37–44	W1
82	July 3	Astros	8–12 (10)	Hernández (3–5)	**Ramirez** (0–1)		**Fenway Park**	37,837	37–45	L1
83	July 4	Astros	6–1	**Buchholz** (7–6)	McHugh (9–4)		**Fenway Park**	36,703	38–45	W1
84	July 5	Astros	5–4	**Barnes** (3–2)	Sipp (2–4)	**Uehara** (19)	**Fenway Park**	36,481	39–45	W2
85	July 7	Marlins	4–3	**Tazawa** (1–3)	Cishek (2–6)	**Uehara** (20)	**Fenway Park**	36,863	40–45	W3
86	July 8	Marlins	6–3	**Porcello** (5–9)	Koehler (7–5)	**Uehara** (21)	**Fenway Park**	37,009	41–45	W4
87	July 10	Yankees	1–5	Pineda (9–5)	**Buchholz** (7–7)		**Fenway Park**	37,984	41–46	L1
88	July 11	Yankees	5–3	**Rodríguez** (5–2)	Nova (1–3)	**Uehara** (22)	**Fenway Park**	38,047	42–46	W1
89	July 12	Yankees	6–8	Eovaldi (9–2)	**Miley** (8–8)		**Fenway Park**	37,283	42–47	L1
ASG	July 14	All-Star Game	**AL** 6–3 NL	Price (AL, DET)	Kershaw (NL, LAD)		Great American Ball Park	Cincinnati, OH		ASG
ASG	The Red Sox were represented in the All-Star game by Brock Holt.									
90	July 17	@ Angels	0–1	Smith (4–2)	**Uehara** (2–4)		Angel Stadium of Anaheim	43,234	42–48	L2
91	July 18	@ Angels	0–3	Richards (10–6)	**Porcello** (5–10)		Angel Stadium of Anaheim	43,631	42–49	L3
—	July 19	@ Angels	**Postponed (rain)** (Makeup date: July 20)							
92	July 20	@ Angels	1–11	Santiago (7–4)	**Rodríguez** (5–3)		Angel Stadium of Anaheim	42,503	42–50	L4
93	July 20	@ Angels	3–7	Heaney (4–0)	**Wright** (3–3)	Smith (1)	Angel Stadium of Anaheim	38,042	42–51	L5
94	July 21	@ Astros	3–8	Velasquez (1–1)	**Johnson** (0–1)		Minute Maid Park	26,913	42–52	L6
95	July 22	@ Astros	2–4	McHugh (11–5)	**Kelly** (2–6)	Gregerson (20)	Minute Maid Park	31,104	42–53	L7
96	July 23	@ Astros	4–5	Fields (3–1)	**Breslow** (0–1)		Minute Maid Park	30,748	42–54	L8
97	July 24	Tigers	2–1 (11)	**Masterson** (4–2)	Hardy (3–2)		**Fenway Park**	37,650	43–54	W1
98	July 25	Tigers	1–5	Simón (9–6)	**Wright** (3–4)		**Fenway Park**	37,256	43–55	L1
99	July 26	Tigers	11–1	**Rodríguez** (6–3)	Greene (4–8)		**Fenway Park**	35,582	44–55	W1
100	July 27	White Sox	8–10	Albers (1–0)	**Ross** (0–1)	Robertson (22)	**Fenway Park**	37,401	44–56	L1
101	July 28	White Sox	4–9	Samardzija (8–5)	**Miley** (8–9)		**Fenway Park**	38,063	44–57	L2
102	July 29	White Sox	2–9	Quintana (6–9)	**Porcello** (5–11)		**Fenway Park**	37,104	44–58	L3
103	July 30	White Sox	8–2	**Wright** (4–4)	Sale (9–6)		**Fenway Park**	36,215	45–58	W1
104	July 31	Rays	7–5	**Tazawa** (2–3)	McGee (0–1)	**Uehara** (23)	**Fenway Park**	36,715	46–58	W2

August (15–12)

#	Date	Opponent	Score	Win	Loss	Save	Stadium	Attendance	Record	Box/ Streak
105	August 1	Rays	11–7	**Kelly** (3–6)	Moore (1–3)	**Machi** (1)	**Fenway Park**	35,944	47–58	W3
106	August 2	Rays	3–4	Geltz (2–4)	**Tazawa** (2–4)	Boxberger (26)	**Fenway Park**	35,699	47–59	L1
107	August 4	@ Yankees	3–13	Tanaka (8–4)	**Owens** (0–1)		Yankee Stadium	48,522	47–60	L2
108	August 5	@ Yankees	2–1	**Wright** (5–4)	Severino (0–1)	**Uehara** (24)	Yankee Stadium	47,489	48–60	W1
109	August 6	@ Yankees	1–2	Wilson (4–0)	**Rodríguez** (6–4)	Miller (24)	Yankee Stadium	48,608	48–61	L1
110	August 7	@ Tigers	7–2	**Kelly** (4–6)	Norris (2–2)		Comerica Park	38,132	49–61	W1
111	August 8	@ Tigers	6–7	Hardy (4–2)	**Tazawa** (2–5)	Rondón (1)	Comerica Park	42,098	49–62	L1
112	August 9	@ Tigers	7–2	**Owens** (1–1)	Verlander (1–5)		Comerica Park	38,766	50–62	W1
113	August 11	@ Marlins	4–5 (10)	Morris (4–3)	**Breslow** (0–2)		Marlins Park	31,951	50–63	L1
114	August 12	@ Marlins	6–14	Barraclough (1–0)	**Rodríguez** (6–5)		Marlins Park	26,041	50–64	L2
115	August 14	Mariners	15–1	**Kelly** (5–6)	Montgomery (4–5)		**Fenway Park**	37,678	51–64	W1
116	August 15	Mariners	22–10	**Miley** (9–9)	Hernández (14–7)		**Fenway Park**	36,027	52–64	W2
117	August 16	Mariners	8–10 (12)	Rasmussen (2–1)	**Breslow** (0–3)	Farquhar (1)	**Fenway Park**	35,260	52–65	L1
118	August 17	Indians	2–8	Salazar (11–6)	**Barnes** (3–3)		**Fenway Park**	32,701	52–66	L2
119	August 18	Indians	9–1	**Rodríguez** (7–5)	Bauer (9–10)		**Fenway Park**	31,907	53–66	W1
120	August 19	Indians	6–4	**Kelly** (6–6)	Kluber (8–13)	**Tazawa** (1)	**Fenway Park**	32,465	54–66	W2
121	August 20	Royals	4–1	**Miley** (10–9)	Duffy (6–6)	**Tazawa** (2)	**Fenway Park**	35,458	55–66	W3
122	August 21	Royals	7–2	**Owens** (2–1)	Cueto (9–8)		**Fenway Park**	35,203	56–66	W4
123	August 22	Royals	3–6	Ventura (8–7)	**Barnes** (3–4)	Holland (28)	**Fenway Park**	37,135	56–67	L1
124	August 23	Royals	6–8	Young (9–6)	**Tazawa** (2–6)	Davis (11)	**Fenway Park**	36,151	56–68	L2
125	August 24	@ White Sox	5–4	**Kelly** (7–6)	Samardzija (8–10)	**Machi** (2)	U.S. Cellular Field	18,051	57–68	W1
126	August 25	@ White Sox	4–5	Petricka (4–3)	**Miley** (10–10)	Robertson (26)	U.S. Cellular Field	14,393	57–69	L1
127	August 26	@ White Sox	3–0	**Porcello** (6–11)	Jones (1–1)	**Tazawa** (3)	U.S. Cellular Field	17,812	58–69	W1
128	August 28	@ Mets	6–4 (10)	**Layne** (1–1)	Torres (5–6)	**Breslow** (1)	Citi Field	39,401	59–69	W2
129	August 29	@ Mets	3–1	**Kelly** (8–6)	deGrom (12–7)	**Machi** (3)	Citi Field	43,255	60–69	W3
130	August 30	@ Mets	4–5	Clippard (3–3)	**Ross** (0–2)	Familia (35)	Citi Field	38,938	60–70	L1
131	August 31	Yankees	4–3	**Rodríguez** (8–5)	Nova (5–7)	**Machi** (4)	**Fenway Park**	36,148	61–70	W1

September / October (17–14)

#	Date	Opponent	Score	Win	Loss	Save	Stadium	Attendance	Record	Box/ Streak
132	September 1	Yankees	1–3	Pineda (10–8)	**Porcello** (6–12)	Miller (29)	**Fenway Park**	35,077	61–71	L1
133	September 2	Yankees	8–13	Tanaka (11–6)	**Owens** (2–2)		**Fenway Park**	34,416	61–72	L2
134	September 4	Phillies	7–5	**Kelly** (9–6)	Morgan (5–5)	**Ross** (1)	**Fenway Park**	33,674	62–72	W1
135	September 5	Phillies	9–2	**Miley** (11–10)	Asher (0–2)		**Fenway Park**	36,534	63–72	W2
136	September 6	Phillies	6–2	**Rodríguez** (9–5)	Eickhoff (1–3)		**Fenway Park**	34,708	64–72	W3
137	September 7	Blue Jays	11–4	**Porcello** (7–12)	Buehrle (14–7)		**Fenway Park**	33,659	65–72	W4
138	September 8	Blue Jays	1–5 (10)	Sanchez (7–5)	**Ogando** (2–1)		**Fenway Park**	33,432	65–73	L1
139	September 9	Blue Jays	10–4	**Kelly** (10–6)	Hutchison (13–4)		**Fenway Park**	34,464	66–73	W1
140	September 11	@ Rays	4–8	Bellatti (3–1)	**Tazawa** (2–7)		Tropicana Field	14,796	66–74	L1
141	September 12	@ Rays	10–4	**Porcello** (8–12)	Moore (1–4)		Tropicana Field	20,698	67–74	W1
142	September 13	@ Rays	2–0 (13)	**Hembree** (1–0)	Romero (0–1)	**Ross** (2)	Tropicana Field	15,402	68–74	W2
143	September 14	@ Orioles	0–2	Gausman (3–6)	**Rodríguez** (9–6)	Britton (33)	Camden Yards	19,666	68–75	L1
144	September 15	@ Orioles	5–6 (13)	Roe (3–2)	**Aro** (0–1)		Camden Yards	21,260	68–76	L2
145	September 16	@ Orioles	10–1	**Owens** (3–2)	Wright (2–5)		Camden Yards	22,642	69–76	W1
146	September 18	@ Blue Jays	1–6	Stroman (2–0)	**Porcello** (8–13)		Rogers Centre	47,126	69–77	L1
147	September 19	@ Blue Jays	7–6	**Layne** (2–1)	Osuna (1–5)	**Ross** (3)	Rogers Centre	47,415	70–77	W1
148	September 20	@ Blue Jays	4–3	**Hill** (1–0)	Cecil (3–5)	**Ross** (4)	Rogers Centre	46,743	71–77	W2
149	September 21	Rays	8–7	**Machi** (2–0)	Gomes (2–6)	**Ross** (5)	**Fenway Park**	33,673	72–77	W3
150	September 22	Rays	2–5	Moore (2–4)	**Owens** (3–3)	Boxberger (36)	**Fenway Park**	33,673	72–78	L1
151	September 23	Rays	2–6	Smyly (4–2)	**Porcello** (8–14)	Boxberger (37)	**Fenway Park**	32,753	72–79	L2
152	September 24	Rays	2–4	Ramírez (11–6)	**Miley** (11–11)	Boxberger (38)	**Fenway Park**	34,916	72–80	L3
153	September 25	Orioles	7–0	**Hill** (2–0)	Gausman (3–7)		**Fenway Park**	32,411	73–80	W1
154	September 26	Orioles	8–0	**Hembree** (2–0)	Chen (10–8)		**Fenway Park**	36,316	74–80	W2
155	September 27	Orioles	2–0	**Owens** (4–3)	Jiménez (12–10)	**Ross** (6)	**Fenway Park**	33,306	75–80	W3
156	September 28	@ Yankees	5–1	**Rodríguez** (10–6)	Nova (6–10)		Yankee Stadium	39,476	76–80	W4
157	September 29	@ Yankees	10–4	**Porcello** (9–14)	Pineda (12–9)		Yankee Stadium	38,512	77–80	W5
158	September 30	@ Yankees	9–5 (11)	**Ogando** (3–1)	Bailey (0–1)		Yankee Stadium	39,328	78–80	W6
159	October 1	@ Yankees	1–4	Sabathia (6–10)	**Hill** (2–1)	Betances (9)	Yankee Stadium	40,033	78–81	L1
160	October 2	@ Indians	2–8	Tomlin (7–2)	**Owens** (4–4)		Progressive Field	28,273	78–82	L2
161	October 3	@ Indians	0–2	Kluber (9–16)	**Breslow** (0–4)	Allen (33)	Progressive Field	17,342	78–83	L3
162	October 4	@ Indians	1–3	Salazar (14–10)	**Porcello** (9–15)	Allen (34)	Progressive Field	17,844	78–84	L4

=== Detailed records ===
**American League**
Opponent	Home	Away	Total	Pct.	Runs scored	Runs allowed
**AL East**
Baltimore Orioles	6–4	2–7	8–11	.421	86	79
**Boston Red Sox**	—	—	—	—	—	—
New York Yankees	2–7	6–4	8–11	.421	83	103
Tampa Bay Rays	4–6	5–4	9–10	.474	74	79
Toronto Blue Jays	4–5	6–4	10–9	.526	99	114
	**16–22**	**19–19**	**35–41**	**.461**	**342**	**375**
**AL Central**
Chicago White Sox	1–3	2–1	3–4	.429	34	39
Cleveland Indians	2–1	0–3	2–4	.333	20	26
Detroit Tigers	2–1	2–1	4–2	.667	34	18
Kansas City Royals	2–2	2–1	4–3	.571	44	29
Minnesota Twins	2–2	0–3	2–5	.286	18	28
	**9–9**	**6–9**	**15–18**	**.455**	**150**	**140**
**AL West**
Houston Astros	2–1	0–3	2–4	.333	28	34
Los Angeles Angels	2–1	0–4	2–5	.286	23	38
Oakland Athletics	3–0	2–1	5–1	.833	24	21
Seattle Mariners	2–1	2–2	4–3	.571	52	31
Texas Rangers	1–2	1–3	2–5	.286	18	28
	**10–5**	**5–13**	**15–18**	**.455**	**145**	**152**

**National League**
Opponent	Home	Away	Total	Pct.	Runs scored	Runs allowed
**NL East**
Atlanta Braves	1–1	1–1	2–2	.500	18	15
Miami Marlins	2–0	0–2	2–2	.500	20	25
New York Mets	–	2–1	2–1	.667	13	10
Washington Nationals	2–1	–	2–1	.667	22	21
Philadelphia Phillies	3–0	2–1	5–1	.833	38	15
	**8–2**	**5–5**	**13–7**	**.650**	**111**	**86**

== Statistics ==
Please note only the statistics from playing with the Red Sox are included in this list.

=== Batting ===
Note: G = Games played; AB = At bats; R = Runs scored; H = Hits; 2B = Doubles; 3B = Triples; HR = Home runs; RBI = Runs batted in; SB = Stolen bases; BB = Walks; AVG = Batting average; Ref. = Reference

Player	G	AB	R	H	2B	3B	HR	RBI	SB	BB	AVG	Ref.
Mookie Betts	145	597	92	174	42	8	18	77	21	46	.291	
Xander Bogaerts	156	613	84	196	35	3	7	81	10	32	.320	
Jackie Bradley Jr.	74	221	43	55	17	4	10	43	3	27	.249	
Alejandro De Aza	60	161	23	47	9	5	4	25	3	12	.292	
Ryan Hanigan	54	174	28	43	8	0	2	16	0	20	.247	
Brock Holt	129	454	56	127	27	6	2	45	8	46	.280	
David Ortiz	146	528	73	144	37	0	37	108	0	77	.273	
Dustin Pedroia	93	381	46	111	19	1	12	42	2	38	.291	
Travis Shaw	65	226	31	62	10	0	13	36	0	18	.274	
Blake Swihart	84	288	47	79	17	1	5	31	4	18	.274	

Rest of the position players
Player	G	AB	R	H	2B	3B	HR	RBI	SB	BB	AVG	Ref.
Jeff Bianchi	3	2	0	0	0	0	0	0	0	0	.000	
Clay Buchholz	2	6	0	0	0	0	0	0	0	0	.000	
Rusney Castillo	80	273	35	69	10	2	5	29	4	13	.253	
Garin Cecchini	2	4	0	0	0	0	0	0	0	0	.000	
Allen Craig	36	79	6	12	1	0	1	3	0	7	.152	
Luis Jiménez	1	1	0	0	0	0	0	0	0	0	.000	
Joe Kelly	2	5	0	1	0	0	0	1	0	0	.200	
Sandy León	41	114	8	21	2	0	0	3	0	7	.184	
Deven Marrero	25	53	8	12	0	0	1	3	2	3	.226	
Justin Masterson	1	3	0	2	0	0	0	1	0	0	.667	
Wade Miley	1	2	0	0	0	0	0	0	0	0	.000	
Mike Napoli	98	329	37	68	18	1	13	40	3	45	.207	
Daniel Nava	29	66	6	10	2	0	0	7	0	8	.152	
Henry Owens	1	2	0	0	0	0	0	0	0	0	.000	
Carlos Peguero	4	5	1	1	0	0	0	0	0	1	.200	
Rick Porcello	1	2	0	0	0	0	0	0	0	0	.000	
Hanley Ramírez	105	401	59	100	12	1	19	53	6	21	.249	
Eduardo Rodríguez	1	2	0	0	0	0	0	0	0	0	.000	
Josh Rutledge	39	74	11	21	1	0	1	10	0	5	.284	
Pablo Sandoval	126	470	43	115	25	1	10	47	0	25	.245	
Shane Victorino	33	94	10	23	2	0	1	4	5	9	.245	
Jemile Weeks	3	9	1	3	0	0	0	1	0	0	.333	
Steven Wright	1	1	0	0	0	0	0	0	0	0	.000	
Team totals	162	5640	748	1495	294	33	161	706	71	478	.265	

Top 10 hitters according to:

=== Pitching ===
Note: G = Games pitched; GS = Games started; W = Wins; L = Losses; SV = Saves; ERA = Earned run average; WHIP = Walks and hits per inning pitched; IP = Innings pitched; H = Hits allowed; R = Total runs allowed; ER = Earned runs allowed; BB = Walks allowed; K = Strikeouts; Ref. = Reference

Player	G	GS	W	L	SV	ERA	WHIP	IP	H	R	ER	BB	K	Ref.
Clay Buchholz	18	18	7	7	0	3.26	1.21	113.1	114	48	41	23	107	
Rich Hill	4	4	2	1	0	1.55	0.66	29.0	14	5	5	5	36	
Joe Kelly	25	25	10	6	0	4.82	1.44	134.1	145	76	72	49	110	
Tommy Layne	64	0	2	1	1	3.97	1.43	47.2	41	22	21	27	45	
Wade Miley	32	32	11	11	0	4.46	1.37	193.2	201	98	96	64	147	
Henry Owens	11	11	4	4	0	4.57	1.37	63.0	62	35	32	24	50	
Rick Porcello	28	28	9	15	0	4.92	1.36	172.0	196	103	94	38	149	
Eduardo Rodríguez	21	21	10	6	0	3.85	1.29	121.2	120	55	52	37	98	
Junichi Tazawa	61	0	2	7	3	4.14	1.33	58.2	65	28	27	13	56	
Koji Uehara	43	0	2	4	25	2.23	0.92	40.1	28	14	10	9	47	

Rest of the pitching staff
Player	G	GS	W	L	SV	ERA	WHIP	IP	H	R	ER	BB	K	Ref.
Jonathan Aro	6	0	0	1	0	6.97	1.84	10.1	15	8	8	4	8	
Matt Barnes	32	2	3	4	0	5.44	1.65	43.0	56	28	26	15	39	
Craig Breslow	45	2	0	4	1	4.15	1.42	65.0	69	33	30	23	46	
Ryan Cook	5	0	0	0	0	27.00	3.92	4.1	13	14	13	4	3	
Heath Hembree	22	0	2	0	0	3.55	1.34	25.1	25	10	10	9	15	
Dalier Hinojosa	1	0	0	0	0	0.00	1.80	1.2	0	0	0	3	2	
Brian Johnson	1	1	0	1	0	8.31	1.62	4.1	3	4	4	4	3	
Jean Machi	26	0	1	0	4	5.09	1.26	23.0	21	14	13	8	20	
Justin Masterson	18	9	4	2	0	5.61	1.60	59.1	68	38	37	27	49	
Román Méndez	3	0	0	0	0	4.50	2.00	2.0	3	1	1	1	1	
Edward Mujica	11	0	1	1	0	4.61	1.32	13.2	15	7	7	3	8	
Alexi Ogando	64	0	3	1	0	3.99	1.33	65.1	59	29	29	28	53	
Noé Ramirez	17	0	0	1	0	4.15	1.54	13.0	13	12	6	7	13	
Robbie Ross	54	0	0	2	6	3.86	1.30	60.2	59	28	26	20	53	
Anthony Varvaro	9	0	0	1	0	4.09	1.82	11.0	14	5	5	6	8	
Steven Wright	16	9	5	4	0	4.09	1.29	72.2	67	38	33	27	52	
Team totals	162	162	78	84	40	4.31	1.36	1448.1	1486	753	694	478	1218	

Top 10 pitchers according to:

== Awards and honors ==
Recipient	Award	Date awarded	Ref.
Mike Napoli	AL Player of the Week (May 18–24)	May 26, 2015	
Mookie Betts	AL Player of the Week (June 15–21)	June 22, 2015	
Brock Holt	All-Star Manager's Pick	July 6, 2015	
David Ortiz	AL Player of the Week (September 7–13)	September 14, 2015	
Xander Bogaerts	Silver Slugger Award (AL Shortstop)	November 12, 2015	

== Farm system ==
Level	Team	League	Manager
AAA	Pawtucket Red Sox	International League	Kevin Boles
AA	Portland Sea Dogs	Eastern League	Billy McMillon
A-Advanced	Salem Red Sox	Carolina League	Carlos Febles
A	Greenville Drive	South Atlantic League	Darren Fenster
A-Short Season	Lowell Spinners	New York–Penn League	Joe Oliver
Rookie	GCL Red Sox	Gulf Coast League	Tom Kotchman
Rookie	DSL Red Sox 1	Dominican Summer League	José Zapata
Rookie	DSL Red Sox 2	Dominican Summer League	Aly González

Note: While the team initially announced one DSL team, two DSL teams were fielded.
LEAGUE CHAMPIONS: GCL Red Sox
