= Josh Rutledge =

American baseball player (born 1989)

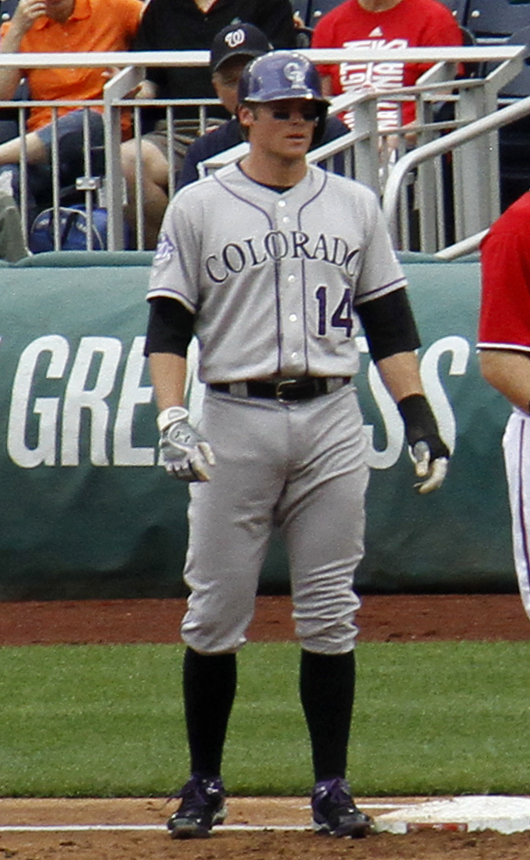
- Rutledge with the Colorado Rockies in 2013
- Infielder
- Born: April 21, 1989 (age 36); Birmingham, Alabama, U.S.
- Batted: Right Threw: Right

MLB debut
- July 13, 2012, for the Colorado Rockies

Last MLB appearance
- June 21, 2017, for the Boston Red Sox

MLB statistics
- Batting average: .258
- Home runs: 20
- Runs batted in: 111
- Stats at Baseball Reference

Teams
- Colorado Rockies (2012–2014); Boston Red Sox (2015–2017)

Joshua Alan Rutledge (born April 21, 1989) is an American former professional baseball infielder. He played in Major League Baseball (MLB) for the Colorado Rockies and Boston Red Sox between 2012 and 2017.

== Amateur career ==
Rutledge attended Cullman High School in north-central Alabama, where he was a four-year starter on the baseball team. In 2006, he had a batting average of .436 with five home runs and 33 runs batted in (RBIs). Cullman was the runner-up in the Class 5A state championship. In 2007, his senior season, Rutledge hit .454 with 12 home runs and 69 RBI and helped his team win the state championship. The Birmingham News and the Alabama Sports Writers Association named him the Class 5A Player of the Year.

Rutledge enrolled at the University of Alabama and played shortstop for the Alabama Crimson Tide baseball team. In 2008, as a freshman, he started 61 games and led the team in batting average (.369), hits (99), runs scored (62), and stolen bases (16). Rutledge became the second freshman to ever lead the team in hitting. From March 26 to May 10, he had a 28-game hitting streak, the third-longest in school history. In 30 SEC games, He batted .406, and his 56 hits led the league. The following season, Rutledge batted .305 with five home runs and 44 RBIs. He was named to the All-SEC first team.

In 2008 and 2009, Rutledge played collegiate summer baseball in the Cape Cod Baseball League for the Yarmouth-Dennis Red Sox.

== Professional career ==
=== Colorado Rockies ===
The Colorado Rockies selected Rutledge in the third round of the 2010 Major League Baseball draft and he signed with the team on June 25. That season, he played 11 games for the Northwest League's Tri-City Dust Devils. The following season, he played for the Modesto Nuts of the California League. Rutledge batted .348 with 9 home runs and 71 RBI and was named the league's player of the week twice. Rutledge was then moved up to the Tulsa Drillers of the Double–A Texas League in 2012. He hit .308 with 13 home runs and 35 RBI.

Rutledge was called up to the major league Rockies in 2012 to play shortstop while Troy Tulowitzki was injured. He made his MLB debut on July 13. Over his first 145 at bats, Rutledge hit .345 with 24 extra base hits. Towards the end of the season, he injured his quadriceps and batted .197 in September. Rutledge finished his first major league season with a .274 batting average, 8 home runs, and 37 RBI. A natural shortstop, Rutledge began playing other infield positions in 2014.

=== Los Angeles Angels of Anaheim ===
On December 11, 2014, the Rockies traded Rutledge to the Los Angeles Angels of Anaheim in exchange for Jairo Díaz. He spent half of the season in Triple-A with the Salt Lake City Bees, hitting .286 with 6 home runs and 34 RBI in 81 games before being traded to the Boston Red Sox in July 2015.

=== Boston Red Sox ===
On July 27, 2015, the Angels traded Rutledge to the Boston Red Sox in exchange for Shane Victorino and $3.8 million in cash considerations. He was designated for assignment on November 30. The Red Sox selected Rutledge's contract from Triple-A Pawtucket on April 24, 2016, following an injury to Pablo Sandoval. Rutledge injured his knee in June and was placed on the 15-day disabled list. On July 14, the team transferred Rutledge to the 60-day disabled list. On November 4, Rutledge elected free agency after declining an outright assignment to Triple-A.

On November 23, 2016, Rutledge signed a minor league contract with the Colorado Rockies. On December 8, the Red Sox selected him from the Rockies with the 26th pick of the Rule 5 draft. Rutledge played in 37 games for Boston, batting .224/.297/.262 with no home runs and nine RBI. On August 30, 2017, he underwent season–ending arthroscopic surgery on his left hip. On November 2, Rutledge was removed from the 40–man roster and sent outright to the Triple–A Pawtucket Red Sox.

=== San Francisco Giants ===
On December 21, 2017, Rutledge signed a minor league contract with the San Francisco Giants. In 18 games for the Triple–A Sacramento River Cats, he batted .077/.111/.077 with no home runs or RBI. Rutledge was released by the Giants organization on June 27, 2018.

Rutledge retired following the conclusion of the 2018 season.

== Personal life ==
Josh was born to Tony and Cheryl Rutledge in Cullman, Alabama, on April 21, 1989. In 2013, he married Laura McKeeman (who took Rutledge's name upon marriage), a reporter and host for ESPN and the SEC Network. On October 2, 2019, his wife gave birth to a daughter. On May 25, 2023, they had their second child and first son, Jack.

== See also ==
- Rule 5 draft results
