= Luis Jiménez (third baseman) =

Dominican baseball player (born 1988)

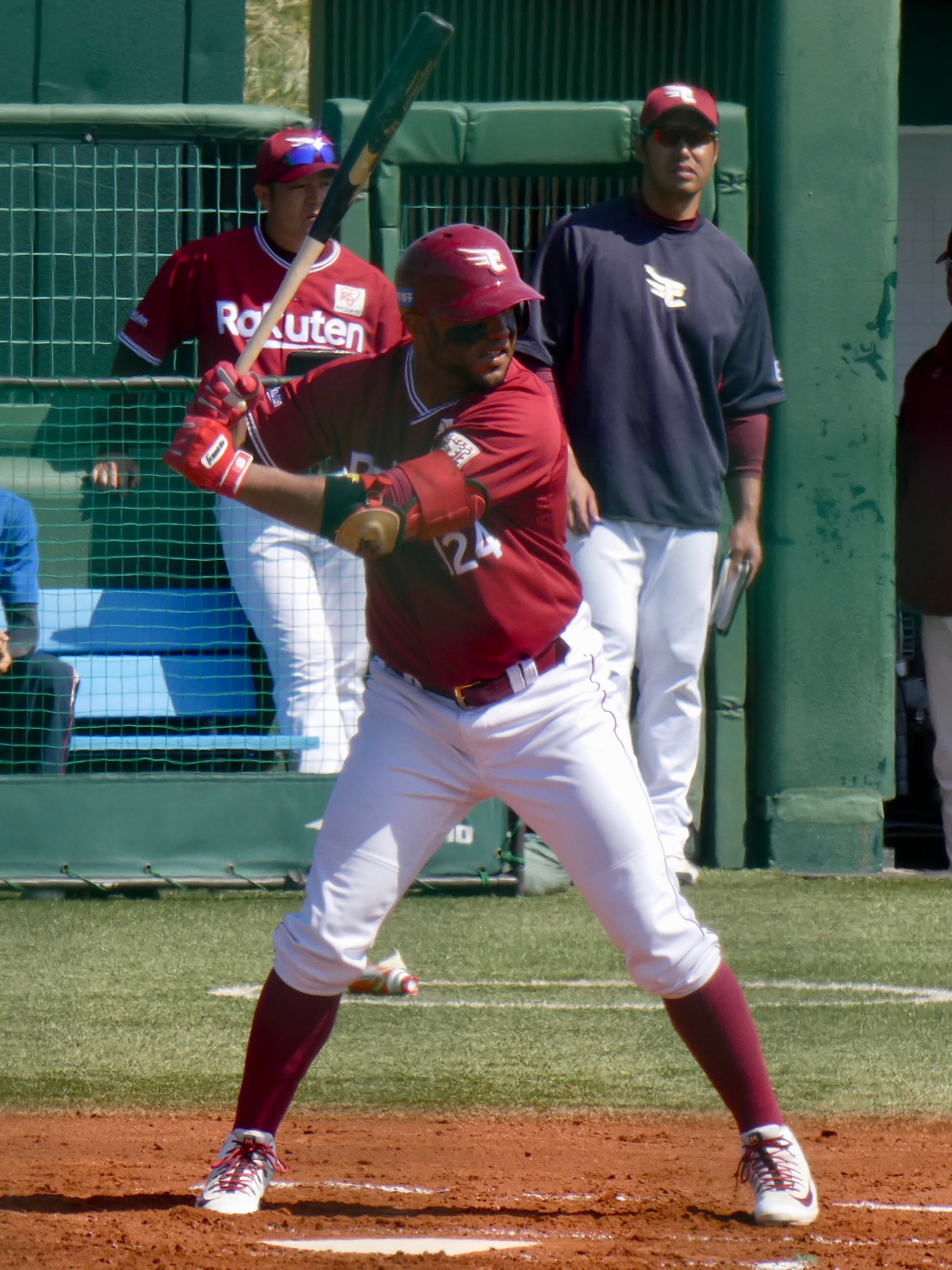
- Jimenez with the Tohoku Rakuten Golden Eagles
- Third baseman
- Born: January 18, 1988 (age 38); Santiago, Dominican Republic
- Batted: Right Threw: Right

Professional debut
- MLB: April 12, 2013, for the Los Angeles Angels of Anaheim
- KBO: June 17, 2015, for the LG Twins

Last appearance
- MLB: May 6, 2015, for the Boston Red Sox
- KBO: June 2, 2017, for the LG Twins

MLB statistics
- Batting average: .217
- Home runs: 0
- Runs batted in: 7

KBO statistics
- Batting average: .303
- Home runs: 44
- Runs batted in: 178
- Stats at Baseball Reference

Teams
- Los Angeles Angels of Anaheim (2013–2014); Milwaukee Brewers (2015); Boston Red Sox (2015); LG Twins (2015–2017)

Luis Domingo Jiménez Rodríguez (born January 18, 1988) is a Dominican former professional baseball third baseman. He has previously played in Major League Baseball (MLB) for the Los Angeles Angels of Anaheim, Milwaukee Brewers, and Boston Red Sox. He has also played in the KBO League for the LG Twins.

== Career ==
=== Los Angeles Angels of Anaheim ===
Jiménez was signed as an international free agent by the Los Angeles Angels of Anaheim on August 22, 2005. He made his professional debut with the Dominican Summer League Angels in 2006, hitting .284/.341/.473 in 25 games. He returned to the team in 2007, batting .313/.347/.531 with 11 home runs and 55 RBI. In 2008, Jiménez played for the rookie-level Orem Owlz, posting a .331/.361/.630 slash line with 15 home runs and 65 RBI. Jiménez missed the 2009 season due to injury and joined the Single-A Cedar Rapids Kernels to begin the 2010 season, later receiving a promotion to the High-A Rancho Cucamonga Quakes, and hit a cumulative .288/.326/.506 with 14 home runs and 81 RBI. Jiménez participated in the 2010 All-Star Futures Game. Jiménez spent the 2012 season with the Double-A Arkansas Travelers, logging a .290/.335/.486 slash line with career-highs in home runs (18) and RBI (94). He was added to the Angels' 40-man roster after the 2011 season. Jiménez spent the 2012 season in Triple-A with the Salt Lake Bees, where he posted a .284/.326/.411 batting line in 48 games.

Jiménez was assigned to Triple-A Salt Lake to begin the 2013 season but was promoted to the major leagues for the first time on April 12, 2013. He made his MLB debut that day with the Angels and went 0-for-3 against the Houston Astros. He finished his rookie season with a .260/.291/.317 batting line in 34 games. For the 2014 season, Jiménez spent much of the year in Salt Lake, and made 18 appearances for the Angels, going 6-for-37 with no home runs.

=== Milwaukee Brewers ===
Jiménez was claimed off waivers by the Milwaukee Brewers on October 27, 2014. Jiménez was designated for assignment by Milwaukee on May 2, 2015, after going 1-for-15 in 15 games with the team.

=== Boston Red Sox ===
Jiménez was claimed off waivers by the Boston Red Sox on May 3, 2015. Jiménez made only 1 appearance for the Red Sox, going hitless in his only at-bat, before he was designated for assignment on May 11. He accepted an outright assignment to Triple-A Pawtucket Red Sox on May 14. Jiménez hit .140 in 14 games with Pawtucket before being released on June 15.

=== LG Twins ===
On June 16, 2015, Jiménez signed with the LG Twins of the Korea Baseball Organization (KBO). In 70 games with the Twins, Jiménez slashed .312/.344/.505 with 11 home runs and 46 RBI. For the 2016 season, Jiménez played in 135 games with the Twins, logging a .308/.363/.526 slash line with 26 home runs and 102 RBI. In 2017, Jiménez hit .276/.333/.436 with 7 home runs and 30 RBI in 51 games before suffering an ankle injury while rounding first base. On July 21, 2017, Jiménez was released by the Twins to make room on the roster for the newly signed James Loney.

=== Diablos Rojos del México ===
On July 18, 2018, Jiménez signed with the Diablos Rojos del México of the Mexican Baseball League. In 43 games for México, Jiménez slashed .291/.351/.488 with 8 home runs and 33 RBI.

=== Tohoku Rakuten Golden Eagles ===
On February 22, 2019, Jiménez signed to a developmental contract with the Tohoku Rakuten Golden Eagles of Nippon Professional Baseball (NPB). He would appear in 67 games with Rakuten's minor league club, batting .234/.299/.385 with 5 home runs and 25 RBI, never appearing in a game for the main club. On December 2, he became a free agent.

=== Arizona Diamondbacks ===
On December 18, 2019, Jiménez signed a minor league deal with the Arizona Diamondbacks. He did not play in a game in 2020 due to the cancellation of the minor league season because of the COVID-19 pandemic. Jiménez was released by the Diamondbacks organization on May 22, 2020.

=== Piratas de Campeche ===
On June 29, 2021, Jiménez signed with the Piratas de Campeche of the Mexican League. He played in 32 games for the team, hitting .322/.381/.479 with 4 home runs and 17 RBI. In 2022, Jiménez played in 87 games for Campeche, batting .347/.372/.600 with 17 home runs, 78 RBI, and 8 stolen bases.

=== Tecolotes de los Dos Laredos ===
On March 27, 2023, Jiménez was traded to the Tecolotes de los Dos Laredos of the Mexican League. In 85 games for Dos Laredos, Jiménez hit .305/.332/.496 with 11 home runs, 57 RBI, and 11 stolen bases.

=== Piratas de Campeche (second stint) ===
On February 19, 2024, Jiménez signed with the Piratas de Campeche of the Mexican League. In 21 games for the Piratas, he hit .253/.317/.373 with two home runs and 10 RBI. On May 10, Jiménez was released by Campeche.
