= 2015 Baltimore Orioles season =

Major League Baseball season

2015 Baltimore Orioles
- League: American League
- Division: East
- Ballpark: Oriole Park at Camden Yards
- City: Baltimore, Maryland
- Record: 81–81 (.500)
- Divisional place: 3rd
- Owners: Peter Angelos
- General managers: Dan Duquette
- Managers: Buck Showalter
- Television: MASN; WJZ-TV (CBS 13) (Gary Thorne, Jim Palmer, Mike Bordick, Jim Hunter)
- Radio: WJZ-FM; Baltimore Orioles Radio Network (Joe Angel, Fred Manfra)

The 2015 Baltimore Orioles season was the 115th season in franchise history, the 62nd in Baltimore, and the 24th at Oriole Park at Camden Yards. They were attempting to defend their 2014 AL East title, but were eliminated from the division title race on September 23, 11 1/2 games back from Toronto. They were eliminated from the postseason on September 28, 6 1/2 games back from Houston for the second AL wild card spot. They finished the season .500 (81-81), their fourth straight non-losing season under manager Buck Showalter.

The one bright spot in an otherwise disappointing season was first baseman Chris Davis winning the MLB home run championship with 47, the third consecutive year in which the crown was won by an Oriole after Davis in 2013 and Nelson Cruz in 2014. Third baseman Manny Machado was the only player in the majors to play all 162 games, a reassuring feat after Machado had missed significant portions of the preceding two seasons due to knee injuries.

== Offseason ==
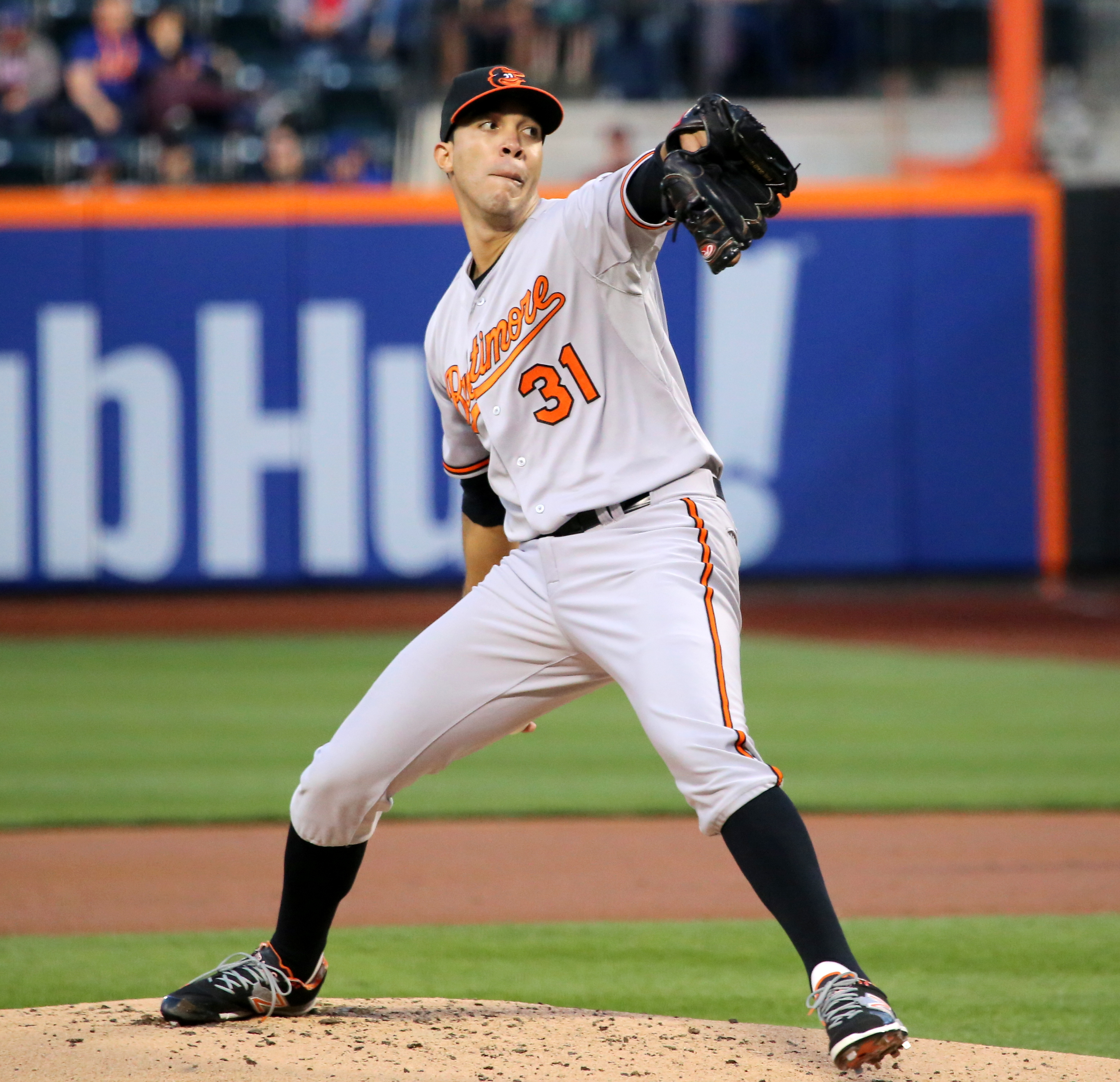
Ubaldo Jiménez pitching against the New York Mets.

October 30: Alexi Casilla, Johan Santana, Andrew Miller, Kelly Johnson, Nelson Cruz, Joe Saunders, Nick Markakis, and Delmon Young entered free agency. Delmon Young would be the only one to re-sign with the team on January 9.

- Casilla signed with the Tampa Bay Rays
- Miller signed with the New York Yankees
- Cruz signed with the Seattle Mariners
- Markakis signed with the Atlanta Braves

October 31: Claimed Pat McCoy off waivers from the Texas Rangers

- The Orioles sent Pat McCoy to the minors on December 8.

November 1: Nick Hundley entered free agency. He signed with the Colorado Rockies.

Week of November 18: Signed 12 players to a minor league contract, and promoted Tyler Wilson and Mike Wright from the minors. They also signed free agent Oliver Drake.

November 26: Signed Rey Navarro and receive Scott Barnes from the Cleveland Indians in exchange for cash.

- The Rangers claimed Barnes off waivers on December 8

December 3: Signed Eddie Gamboa from free agency.

December 11: Drafted Logan Verrett and received Jason Garcia from the Houston Astros in exchange for cash.

December 15: Gave Jesse Beal, Chaz Roe, and Matt Tuiasosopo a minor league contract.

December 19: Signed Wesley Wright.

December 23: Released Quintin Berry and claimed Ryan Lavarnway off the Chicago Cubs

- The Orioles sent Lavarnway to the minors on January 16.

December 24: Signed Cesar Cabral to a minor league contract.

January 5 – 21: Signed 7 players (including J. P. Arencibia) to a minor league contract.

January 23: Received Hector Daniel Rodriguez from the Braves for cash.

January 27: Received Travis Snider from the Pittsburgh Pirates and gave them Stephen Tarpley and a player to be named. Also designated Mike Ohlman for assignment and signed 3 players to a minor league contract.

- The St. Louis Cardinals received Ohlman for cash on February 3.

January 29: Signed Brad Duffy to a minor league contract.

February 2: Signed Julio Borbon to a minor league contract.

February 3: Traded Steve Lombardozzi Jr. to the Pittsburgh Pirates for cash. Also traded Mike Ohlman to the St Louis Cardinals for cash.

February 10: Signed former Oriole free agents Mark Hendrickson and Nolan Reimold to minor league contracts.

February 11–17: Signed four players (including Jayson Nix) to minor league contracts.

February 20: Sent Steven Brault to the Pittsburgh Pirates as the PTBNL in the Travis Snider trade.

February 25: Signed free agent Everth Cabrera and designated Alex Hassan for assignment.

- The Oakland Athletics claimed Hassan off waivers on February 27.

== Regular season ==
=== Transactions ===
==== Contracts ====
April 6: C Ryan Lavarnway's contract selected from AAA Norfolk Tides; RHP Ryan Webb designated for assignment
April 9: RHP Ryan Webb and C Brian Ward traded to Los Angeles Dodgers for RHP Ben Rowen and C Chris O'Brien

May 11 RHP Jorge Rondon claimed off waivers from Colorado Rockies
May 24 RHP Chaz Roe's contract selected from AAA Norfolk Tides
May 26: C Ryan Lavarnway designated for assignment
May 27: LF Alejandro De Aza designated for assignment
May 29: C Ryan Lavarnway outrighted to AAA

June 3: LF Alejandro De Aza traded to Boston Red Sox for RHP Joe Gunkel
June 5: LHP Cesar Cabral's contract selected from AAA Norfolk Tides; SS Everth Cabrera designated for assignment
June 9: OF Nolan Reimold's contract selected from AAA Norfolk Tides
June 13: SS Everth Cabrera released
June 15: 1B Chris Parmelee's contract selected from AAA Norfolk Tides
June 20: RHP Mychal Givens' contract selected from AA Bowie Baysox

July 1: RF/DH Delmon Young designated for assignment
July 9: RF/DH Delmon Young released
July 14: LHP Wesley Wright designated for assignment
July 22: LHP Wesley Wright released
July 31: OF Gerardo Parra acquired from Milwaukee Brewers for RHP Zach Davies; OF Junior Lake acquired from Chicago Cubs for RHP Tommy Hunter; RHP Bud Norris and 1B Chris Parmelee designated for assignment

August 7: OF Travis Snider designated for assignment
August 8: RHP Bud Norris released; 1B Chris Parmelee outrighted to AAA
August 14: LF David Lough designated for assignment
August 15: OF Travis Snider released
August 23: LF David Lough optioned to AAA

==== Callups and optional assignments ====
April 5: LHP T. J. McFarland optioned to AAA
April 7: C Steve Clevenger optioned to AAA
April 11: RHP Eddie Gamboa recalled from AAA
April 13 RHP Eddie Gamboa optioned to AAA
April 24: IF Rey Navarro recalled from AAA

May 8: LHP T. J. McFarland recalled from AAA; IF Rey Navarro optioned to AAA
May 11: RHP Jorge Rondon optioned to AAA
May 12: IF Rey Navarro recalled from AAA
May 13: RHP Mike Wright recalled from AAA
May 18: RHP Tyler Wilson recalled from AAA
May 22: IF Rey Navarro optioned to AAA
May 23: RHP Oliver Drake recalled from AAA; RHP Tyler Wilson optioned to AAA
May 24: LHP T. J. McFarland optioned to AAA
May 26: C Steve Clevenger recalled from AAA
May 28: RHP Tyler Wilson recalled from AAA
May 29: RHP Tyler Wilson optioned to AAA

June 3: LHP T. J. McFarland recalled from AAA; RHP Oliver Drake optioned to AAA
June 5: IF Rey Navarro recalled from AAA; C Steve Clevenger and RHP Mike Wright optioned to AAA
June 7: IF Rey Navarro optioned to AAA
June 9: LHP Cesar Cabral optioned to AAA
June 11: RHP Mike Wright recalled from AAA
June 14: RHP Tyler Wilson recalled from AAA; LHP T. J. McFarland optioned to AAA
June 15: LHP Wei-Yin Chen optioned to A
June 20: RHP Mike Wright and RHP Tyler Wilson optioned to AAA
June 21: RHP Oliver Drake recalled from AAA; RHP Kevin Gausman optioned to AAA
June 24: LHP T. J. McFarland recalled from AAA; RHP Oliver Drake optioned to AAA
June 25: RHP Mychal Givens optioned to AA
June 26: LHP Wei-Yin Chen recalled from A; LHP T. J. McFarland optioned to AAA
June 28: LHP T. J. McFarland recalled from AAA
June 29: LHP T. J. McFarland optioned to AAA

July 1: RHP Tyler Wilson recalled from AAA
July 2: RHP Kevin Gausman recalled from AAA; RHP Tyler Wilson optioned to AAA
July 5: 2B Ryan Flaherty optioned to AAA
July 6: 2B Ryan Flaherty recalled from AAA
July 8: 1B Christian Walker recalled from AAA; RHP Kevin Gausman optioned to AAA
July 9: 1B Christian Walker optioned to AAA
July 22: RHP Kevin Gausman recalled from AAA
July 31: RHP Mike Wright recalled from AAA; RHP Mychal Givens recalled from AA; OF Junior Lake optioned to AAA

August 1: RHP Jorge Rondon recalled from AAA
August 3: RHP Tyler Wilson recalled from AAA; RHP Jorge Rondon optioned to AAA
August 4: LHP T. J. McFarland recalled from AAA; RHP Tyler Wilson optioned to AAA
August 6: RHP Mychal Givens optioned to AA
August 7: OF Junior Lake recalled from AAA
August 10: RHP Mychal Givens recalled from AA
August 14: C Steve Clevenger recalled from AAA
August 15: OF Henry Urrutia recalled from AAA; OF Junior Lake optioned to AAA

==== Injuries, etc. ====
April 5: SS J. J. Hardy, C Matt Wieters, LF David Lough and 3B/DH Jimmy Paredes placed on 15-day disabled list
April 7: 1B Chris Davis activated from restricted list
April 11: LHP Wesley Wright placed on 15-day disabled list
April 13: LF David Lough activated from disabled list
April 18: 2B Jonathan Schoop placed on 15-day disabled list; 3B/DH Jimmy Paredes activated from disabled list
April 24: 2B Ryan Flaherty placed on 15-day disabled list

May 7: SS J J Hardy activated from disabled list; SS Everth Cabrera placed on 15-day disabled list
May 8: RHP Kevin Gausman placed on 15-day disabled list; 2B Ryan Flaherty activated from disabled list
May 10: C Matt Wieters transferred to 60-day disabled list
May 12: 2B Ryan Flaherty placed on 15-day disabled list
May 13: RHP Jason Garcia placed on 15-day disabled list
May 18: RHP Bud Norris placed on 15-day disabled list
May 22: SS Everth Cabrera activated from disabled list
May 24: RHP Wesley Wright transferred to 60-day disabled list
May 27: 2B Ryan Flaherty activated from disabled list

June 5: LHP Brian Matusz placed on restricted list (8-game suspension for foreign substance); C Matt Wieters activated from disabled list
June 7: RHP Bud Norris activated from disabled list
June 11: RHP Miguel Gonzales placed on 15-day disabled list
June 14: LHP Brian Matusz activated from restricted list
June 16: 2B Jonathan Schoop transferred to 60-day disabled list
June 20: RHP Kevin Gausman activated from disabled list; RHP Jason Garcia transferred to 60-day disabled list
June 25: RHP Miguel Gonzales activated from disabled list

July 5: 2B Jonathan Schoop activated from disabled list
July 6: OF Nolan Reimold placed on paternity list
July 9: OF Nolan Reimold activated from paternity list
July 14: LHP Wesley Wright activated from disabled list
July 22: OF Steve Pearce placed on 15-day disabled list

August 1: RHP Mike Wright placed on 15-day disabled list
August 6: RHP Jason Garcia activated from disabled list
August 10: RHP Chaz Roe placed on 15-day disabled list

=== Season highlights ===
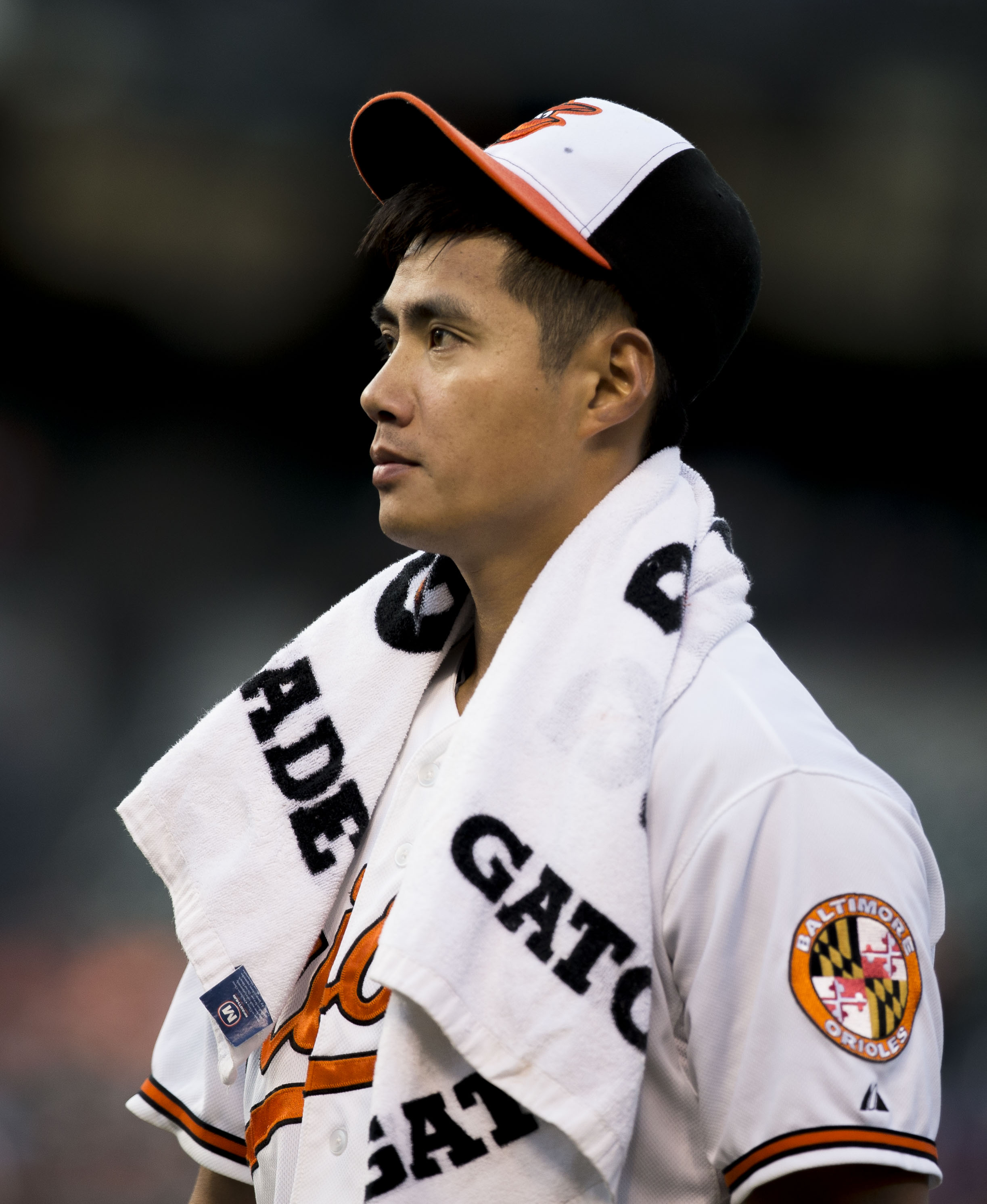
Pitcher Wei-Yin Chen.

- The team's April 29 home game against the White Sox became the first in MLB history to be played without a paying crowd, as safety concerns over the ongoing civil unrest in the city led the team to play with the stadium closed to the public following two postponed games. The next series, scheduled to be a home series against the Tampa Bay Rays, was moved to Tampa Bay with Baltimore being the designated home team for the same reason.
- On June 16, the team broke a franchise record by hitting 8 home runs against the Phillies.
- On June 28, the team swept a doubleheader against the Indians, 4-0 and 8–0. It was the first time an O's team had won both ends of a doubleheader by shutout since 1974.
- On August 12, Seattle Mariners pitcher Hisashi Iwakuma threw a no-hitter against the Orioles.
- On August 16, the Orioles tied a franchise record with twenty-six hits in a single game in an 18–2 victory over the Oakland Athletics. This was also the first time in Browns/Orioles history the team had scored 18 runs or more three times in a season (18–7 over Boston on 4/26 and 19–3 over Philadelphia on 6/16).
- On October 3, the team swept a doubleheader against the Yankees, 9-2 and 4–3. It was the second time the O's won both ends of a doubleheader this season.

== Season standings ==
=== American League East ===
AL East
| Team | W | L | Pct. | GB | Home | Road |
|---|---|---|---|---|---|---|
| Toronto Blue Jays | 93 | 69 | .574 | — | 53‍–‍28 | 40‍–‍41 |
| New York Yankees | 87 | 75 | .537 | 6 | 45‍–‍36 | 42‍–‍39 |
| Baltimore Orioles | 81 | 81 | .500 | 12 | 47‍–‍31 | 34‍–‍50 |
| Tampa Bay Rays | 80 | 82 | .494 | 13 | 42‍–‍42 | 38‍–‍40 |
| Boston Red Sox | 78 | 84 | .481 | 15 | 43‍–‍38 | 35‍–‍46 |

=== American League Wild Card ===
Division leaders
| Team | W | L | Pct. |
|---|---|---|---|
| Kansas City Royals | 95 | 67 | .586 |
| Toronto Blue Jays | 93 | 69 | .574 |
| Texas Rangers | 88 | 74 | .543 |

Wild Card teams (Top 2 teams qualify for postseason)
| Team | W | L | Pct. | GB |
|---|---|---|---|---|
| New York Yankees | 87 | 75 | .537 | +1 |
| Houston Astros | 86 | 76 | .531 | — |
| Los Angeles Angels of Anaheim | 85 | 77 | .525 | 1 |
| Minnesota Twins | 83 | 79 | .512 | 3 |
| Cleveland Indians | 81 | 80 | .503 | 4½ |
| Baltimore Orioles | 81 | 81 | .500 | 5 |
| Tampa Bay Rays | 80 | 82 | .494 | 6 |
| Boston Red Sox | 78 | 84 | .481 | 8 |
| Chicago White Sox | 76 | 86 | .469 | 10 |
| Seattle Mariners | 76 | 86 | .469 | 10 |
| Detroit Tigers | 74 | 87 | .460 | 11½ |
| Oakland Athletics | 68 | 94 | .420 | 18 |

=== Record vs. opponents ===
2015 American League record Source: MLB Standings Grid – 2015
| Team | BAL | BOS | CWS | CLE | DET | HOU | KC | LAA | MIN | NYY | OAK | SEA | TB | TEX | TOR | NL |
|---|---|---|---|---|---|---|---|---|---|---|---|---|---|---|---|---|
| Baltimore | — | 11–8 | 3–3 | 5–1 | 4–3 | 3–4 | 3–4 | 2–4 | 0–7 | 10–9 | 6–1 | 3–3 | 10–9 | 1–6 | 8–11 | 12–8 |
| Boston | 8–11 | — | 3–4 | 2–4 | 4–2 | 2–4 | 4–3 | 2–5 | 2–5 | 8–11 | 5–1 | 4–3 | 9–10 | 2–5 | 10–9 | 13–7 |
| Chicago | 3–3 | 4–3 | — | 10–9 | 9–10 | 5–1 | 7–12 | 4–3 | 6–13 | 2–5 | 5–2 | 4–3 | 1–5 | 3–3 | 4–3 | 9–11 |
| Cleveland | 1–5 | 4–2 | 9–10 | — | 7–11 | 5–2 | 9–10 | 4–2 | 7–12 | 5–2 | 3–4 | 4–3 | 5–2 | 3–3 | 3–4 | 12–8 |
| Detroit | 3–4 | 2–4 | 10–9 | 11–7 | — | 3–4 | 9–10 | 1–6 | 11–8 | 2–5 | 2–4 | 4–3 | 3–3 | 2–5 | 2–4 | 9–11 |
| Houston | 4–3 | 4–2 | 1–5 | 2–5 | 4–3 | — | 4–2 | 10–9 | 3–3 | 4–3 | 10–9 | 12–7 | 2–5 | 6–13 | 4–3 | 16–4 |
| Kansas City | 4–3 | 3–4 | 12–7 | 10–9 | 10–9 | 2–4 | — | 6–1 | 12–7 | 2–4 | 5–1 | 4–2 | 6–1 | 3–4 | 3–4 | 13–7 |
| Los Angeles | 4–2 | 5–2 | 3–4 | 2–4 | 6–1 | 9–10 | 1–6 | — | 5–2 | 2–4 | 11–8 | 12–7 | 3–3 | 12–7 | 2–5 | 8–12 |
| Minnesota | 7–0 | 5–2 | 13–6 | 12–7 | 8–11 | 3–3 | 7–12 | 2–5 | — | 1–5 | 4–3 | 4–3 | 4–2 | 3–3 | 2–5 | 8–12 |
| New York | 9–10 | 11–8 | 5–2 | 2–5 | 5–2 | 3–4 | 4–2 | 4–2 | 5–1 | — | 3–4 | 5–1 | 12–7 | 2–5 | 6–13 | 11–9 |
| Oakland | 1–6 | 1–5 | 2–5 | 4–3 | 4–2 | 9–10 | 1–5 | 8–11 | 3–4 | 4–3 | — | 6–13 | 3–4 | 10–9 | 1–5 | 11–9 |
| Seattle | 3–3 | 3–4 | 3–4 | 3–4 | 3–4 | 7–12 | 2–4 | 7–12 | 3–4 | 1–5 | 13–6 | — | 4–3 | 12–7 | 4–2 | 8–12 |
| Tampa Bay | 9–10 | 10–9 | 5–1 | 2–5 | 3–3 | 5–2 | 1–6 | 3–3 | 2–4 | 7–12 | 4–3 | 3–4 | — | 2–5 | 10–9 | 14–6 |
| Texas | 6–1 | 5–2 | 3–3 | 3–3 | 5–2 | 13–6 | 4–3 | 7–12 | 3–3 | 5–2 | 9–10 | 7–12 | 5–2 | — | 2–4 | 11–9 |
| Toronto | 11–8 | 9–10 | 3–4 | 4–3 | 4–2 | 3–4 | 4–3 | 5–2 | 5–2 | 13–6 | 5–1 | 2–4 | 9–10 | 4–2 | — | 12–8 |

== Game log ==
Past games legend
| Orioles Win (#bfb) | Orioles Loss (#fbb) | Game postponed (#bbb) | Eliminated from playoff contention (#933) |
Bold denotes an Orioles pitcher

Baltimore Orioles 2015 Season Game Log — Season Record: 81–81 (.500)
April: 10–10 (Home: 6–4; Away: 4–6)

| # | Date | Opponent | Score | Win | Loss | Save | Attendance | Record | Box/ Streak |
|---|---|---|---|---|---|---|---|---|---|
| 1 | April 6 | @ Rays | 6–2 | **Tillman** (1–0) | Archer (0–1) | — | 31,042 | 1–0 | W1 |
| 2 | April 7 | @ Rays | 6–5 | **Gausman** (1–0) | Karns (0–1) | **Britton** (1) | 13,906 | 2–0 | W2 |
| 3 | April 8 | @ Rays | 0–2 | Odorizzi (1–0) | **González** (0–1) | Boxberger (1) | 13,569 | 2–1 | L1 |
| 4 | April 10 | Blue Jays | 5–12 | Buehrle (1–0) | **Norris** (0–1) | — | 45,936 | 2–2 | L2 |
| 5 | April 11 | Blue Jays | 7–1 | **Jiménez** (1–0) | Sanchez (0–1) | — | 38,897 | 3–2 | W1 |
| 6 | April 12 | Blue Jays | 7–10 | Loup (1–1) | **Tillman** (1–1) | Castro (2) | 32,522 | 3–3 | L1 |
| 7 | April 13 | Yankees | 5–6 | Pineda (1–0) | **Hunter** (0–1) | Miller (2) | 21,633 | 3–4 | L2 |
| 8 | April 14 | Yankees | 4–3 | **González** (1–1) | Cabathia (0–2) | **Britton** (2) | 19,283 | 4–4 | W1 |
| 9 | April 15 | Yankees | 7–5 | **Brach** (1–0) | Carpenter (0–1) | **Britton** (3) | 23,409 | 5–4 | W2 |
| 10 | April 17 | @ Red Sox | 2–3 | Uehara (1–0) | **Matusz** (0–1) | — | 34,341 | 5–5 | L1 |
| 11 | April 18 | @ Red Sox | 4–1 | **Tillman** (2–1) | Buchholz (2–1) | **Britton** (4) | 37,655 | 6–5 | W1 |
| 12 | April 19 | @ Red Sox | 8–3 | **González** (2–1) | Porcello (1–2) | — | 37,761 | 7–5 | W2 |
| 13 | April 20 | @ Red Sox | 1–7 (7) | Masterson (2–0) | **Chen** (0–1) | — | 36,829 | 7–6 | L1 |
| 14 | April 21 | @ Blue Jays | 6–13 | Buehrle (3–0) | **Norris** (0–2) | — | 14,184 | 7–7 | L2 |
| 15 | April 22 | @ Blue Jays | 2–4 | Sanchez (1–2) | **Jiménez** (1–1) | Castro (3) | 15,606 | 7–8 | L3 |
| 16 | April 23 | @ Blue Jays | 6–7 | Hutchison (2–0) | **Tillman** (2–2) | Castro (4) | 18,581 | 7–9 | L4 |
| 17 | April 24 | Red Sox | 5–7 | Ogando (1–0) | **Matusz** (0–2) | Uehara (3) | 37,359 | 7–10 | L5 |
| 18 | April 25 | Red Sox | 5–4 (10) | **Matusz** (1–2) | Uehara (1–1) | — | 36,757 | 8–10 | W1 |
| 19 | April 26 | Red Sox | 18–7 | **Norris** (1–2) | Miley (1–2) | — | 43,802 | 9–10 | W2 |
| — | April 27 | White Sox | Postponed (safety concerns due to the 2015 Baltimore riots). Makeup date May 28 as part of doubleheader. | | | | | | |
| — | April 28 | White Sox | Postponed (safety concerns due to the 2015 Baltimore riots). Makeup date May 28 as part of doubleheader. | | | | | | |
| 20 | April 29 | White Sox | 8–2 | **Jiménez** (2–1) | Samardzija (1–2) | — | N/A | 10–10 | W3 |

May: 13–16 (Home: 11–9; Away: 2–7)

| # | Date | Opponent | Score | Win | Loss | Save | Attendance | Record | Box/ Streak |
|---|---|---|---|---|---|---|---|---|---|
| 21 | May 1 | Rays (Note: Games moved to Tropicana Field for safety concerns due to the 2015 Baltimore riots.) | 0–2 | Colomé (1–0) | **Tillman** (2–3) | Boxberger (4) | 9,945 | 10–11 | L1 |
| 22 | May 2 | Rays | 4–0 | **González** (3–1) | Archer (3–3) | **Brach** (1) | 12,789 | 11–11 | W1 |
| 23 | May 3 | Rays | 4–2 | **Hunter** (1–1) | Geltz (1–1) | **Britton** (5) | 16,652 | 12–11 | W2 |
| 24 | May 5 | @ Mets | 2–3 | Colón (5–1) | **Norris** (1–3) | Familia (11) | 20,534 | 12–12 | L1 |
| 25 | May 6 | @ Mets | 1–5 | deGrom (3–3) | **Jiménez** (2–2) | — | 21,667 | 12–13 | L2 |
| 26 | May 7 | @ Yankees | 3–4 | Eovaldi (3–0) | **Tillman** (2–4) | Miller (12) | 39,816 | 12–14 | L3 |
| 27 | May 8 | @ Yankees | 4–5 | Betances (4–0) | **González** (3–2) | Miller (13) | 38,731 | 12–15 | L4 |
| 28 | May 9 | @ Yankees | 6–2 | **Chen** (1–1) | Whitley (1–1) | **Britton** (6) | 41,280 | 13–15 | W1 |
| 29 | May 10 | @ Yankees | 2–6 | Pineda (5–0) | **Norris** (1–4) | — | 39,059 | 13–16 | L1 |
| 30 | May 11 | Blue Jays | 5–2 | **Jiménez** (3–2) | Estrada (1–2) | **Britton** (7) | 20,468 | 14–16 | W1 |
| 31 | May 12 | Blue Jays | 2–10 | Buehrle (5–2) | **Tillman** (2–5) | — | 17,319 | 14–17 | L1 |
| 32 | May 13 | Blue Jays | 6–1 | **González** (4–2) | Sanchez (3–3) | **O'Day** (1) | 24,654 | 15–17 | W1 |
| 33 | May 15 | Angels | 1–3 | Weaver (2–4) | **Chen** (1–2) | Street (12) | 35,470 | 15–18 | L1 |
| 34 | May 16 | Angels | 1–6 | Shoemaker (3–3) | **Jiménez** (3–3) | — | 29,102 | 15–19 | L2 |
| 35 | May 17 | Angels | 3–0 | **Wright** (1–0) | Richards (4–2) | **Britton** (8) | 41,733 | 16–19 | W1 |
| 36 | May 19 | Mariners | 9–4 | **González** (5–2) | Farquhar (0–2) | — | 19,494 | 17–19 | W2 |
| 37 | May 20 | Mariners | 2–4 | Elías (1–1) | **Chen** (1–3) | Rodney (10) | 21,710 | 17–20 | L1 |
| 38 | May 21 | Mariners | 5–4 | **Hunter** (2–1) | Farquhar (0–3) | **Britton** (9) | 33,085 | 18–20 | W1 |
| 39 | May 22 | @ Marlins | 8–5 | **Wilson** (1–0) | Álvarez (0–4) | — | 19,977 | 19–20 | W2 |
| 40 | May 23 | @ Marlins | 0–1 (13) | Capps (1–0) | **McFarland** (0–1) | — | 21,356 | 19–21 | L1 |
| 41 | May 24 | @ Marlins | 2–5 | Koehler (3–3) | **González** (5–3) | Ramos (2) | 23,834 | 19–22 | L2 |
| 42 | May 25 | Astros | 4–3 | **Brach** (2–0) | Keuchel (6–1) | **Britton** (11) | 28,909 | 20–22 | W1 |
| 43 | May 26 | Astros | 1–4 | Feldman (4–4) | **Tillman** (2–6) | Gregerson (13) | 21,541 | 20–23 | L1 |
| 44 | May 27 | Astros | 5–4 | **Brach** (3–0) | Sipp (2–2) | **Britton** (12) | 16,401 | 21–23 | W1 |
| 45 | May 28 | White Sox | 2–3 | Sale (4–2) | **Wilson** (1–1) | Petricka (1) | 18,441 (Note: Single-Admission Doubleheader) | 21–24 | L1 |
| 46 | May 28 | White Sox | 6–3 | **Wright** (2–0) | Beck (0–1) | **Britton** (13) | 18,441 | 22–24 | W1 |
| 47 | May 29 | Rays | 2–1 | **O'Day** (1–0) | Gomes (1–2) | — | 45,505 | 23–24 | W2 |
| 48 | May 30 | Rays | 0–3 | Ramírez (3–2) | **Chen** (1–4) | Boxberger (14) | 38,177 | 23–25 | L1 |
| 49 | May 31 | Rays | 5–9 | Odorizzi (4–5) | **Tillman** (2–7) | Boxberger (15) | 36,945 | 23–26 | L2 |

June: 18–10 (Home: 10–3; Away: 8–7)

| # | Date | Opponent | Score | Win | Loss | Save | Attendance | Record | Box/ Streak |
|---|---|---|---|---|---|---|---|---|---|
| 50 | June 1 | @ Astros | 2–5 | Harris (2–0) | **Brach** (3–1) | Gregerson (14) | 17,259 | 23–27 | L3 |
| 51 | June 2 | @ Astros | 4–6 | McHugh (6–2) | **Wright** (2–1) | Gregerson (15) | 18,730 | 23–28 | L4 |
| 52 | June 3 | @ Astros | 1–3 | McCullers (2–0) | **González** (5–4) | — | 20,305 | 23–29 | L5 |
| 53 | June 4 | @ Astros | 3–2 | **O'Day** (2–0) | Qualls (1–3) | **Britton** (14) | 20,219 | 24–29 | W1 |
| 54 | June 5 | @ Indians | 5–2 | **Tillman** (3–7) | Marcum (2–1) | **Britton** (15) | 26,070 | 25–29 | W2 |
| 55 | June 6 | @ Indians | 1–2 | Salazar (6–1) | **Brach** (3–2) | Allen (13) | 24,939 | 25–30 | L1 |
| 56 | June 7 | @ Indians | 6–2 | **Norris** (2–4) | Carrasco (7–5) | — | 18,151 | 26–30 | W1 |
| 57 | June 9 | Red Sox | 1–0 | **Roe** (1–0) | Barnes (2–1) | **Britton** (16) | 28,460 | 27–30 | W2 |
| 58 | June 10 | Red Sox | 5–2 | **Chen** (2–4) | Porcello (4–6) | **O'Day** (2) | 22,201 | 28–30 | W3 |
| 59 | June 11 | Red Sox | 6–5 | **Tillman** (4–7) | Miley (5–6) | **Britton** (17) | 22,840 | 29–30 | W4 |
| 60 | June 12 | Yankees | 11–3 | **Jiménez** (4–3) | Pineda (7–3) | — | 33,203 | 30–30 | W5 |
| 61 | June 13 | Yankees | 9–4 | **Roe** (2–0) | Martin (0–2) | — | 38,909 | 31–30 | W6 |
| 62 | June 14 | Yankees | 3–5 | Shreve (3–1) | **Wright** (2–2) | Betances (3) | 36,343 | 31–31 | L1 |
| 63 | June 15 | Phillies | 4–0 | **Chen** (3–4) | Harang (4–8) | — | 23,730 | 32–31 | W1 |
| 64 | June 16 | Phillies | 19–3 | **Tillman** (5–7) | Williams (3–7) | — | 26,964 | 33–31 | W2 |
| 65 | June 17 | @ Phillies | 6–4 | **Jiménez** (5–3) | Correia (0–1) | **Britton** (18) | 26,162 | 34–31 | W3 |
| 66 | June 18 | @ Phillies | 1–2 | Diekman (1–1) | **Norris** (2–5) | Papelbon (13) | 26,220 | 34–32 | L1 |
| 67 | June 19 | @ Blue Jays | 4–5 | Estrada (5–3) | **Wright** (2–3) | Cecil (5) | 32,322 | 34-33 | L2 |
| 68 | June 20 | @ Blue Jays | 5–3 | **O'Day** (3–0) | Loup (2–4) | **Britton** (19) | 46,018 | 35–33 | W1 |
| 69 | June 21 | @ Blue Jays | 13–9 | **O'Day** (4–0) | Cecil (1–4) | — | 46,092 | 36–33 | W2 |
| 70 | June 23 | @ Red Sox | 6–4 | **Jiménez** (6–3) | Kelly (2–5) | **Britton** (20) | 36,508 | 37–33 | W3 |
| 71 | June 24 | @ Red Sox | 1–5 | Buchholz (5–6) | **Norris** (2–6) | — | 37,762 | 37–34 | L1 |
| 72 | June 25 | @ Red Sox | 8–6 | **González** (6–4) | Rodríguez (3–2) | **Britton** (21) | 37,706 | 38–34 | W1 |
| 73 | June 26 | Indians | 4–3 | **O'Day** (5–0) | Rzepczynski (1–3) | **Britton** (22) | 31,112 | 39–34 | W2 |
| — | June 27 | Indians | Postponed (rain). Makeup date June 28 as part of doubleheader. | | | | | | |
| 74 | June 28 | Indians | 4–0 | **Jiménez** (7–3) | Bauer (6–5) | — | 45,675 | 40–34 | W3 |
| 75 | June 28 | Indians | 8–0 | **Tillman** (6–7) | Murata (0–1) | — | 40,006 | 41–34 | W4 |
| 76 | June 29 | Rangers | 1–8 | Rodríguez (5–3) | **Norris** (2–7) | — | 21,565 | 41–35 | L1 |
| 77 | June 30 | Rangers | 5–8 | Lewis (8–3) | **González** (6–5) | Tolleson (11) | 27,370 | 41–36 | L2 |

July: 11–14 (Home: 6–4; Away: 5–10)

| # | Date | Opponent | Score | Win | Loss | Save | Attendance | Record | Box/ Streak |
|---|---|---|---|---|---|---|---|---|---|
| 78 | July 1 | Rangers | 4–2 | **Chen** (4–4) | Martinez (5–5) | **Britton** (23) | 23,019 | 42–36 | W1 |
| 79 | July 2 | Rangers | 0–2 | Kela (5–5) | **Roe** (2–0) | Tolleson (12) | 31,915 | 42–37 | L1 |
| 80 | July 3 | @ White Sox | 0–1 | Danks (4–8) | **Jiménez** (7–4) | Robertson (17) | 27,384 | 42–38 | L2 |
| 81 | July 4 | @ White Sox | 2–3 | Putnam (2–3) | **Norris** (2–8) | Robertson (18) | 22,559 | 42–39 | L3 |
| 82 | July 5 | @ White Sox | 9–1 | **González** (7–5) | Rodon (3–2) | — | 22,519 | 43–39 | W1 |
| 83 | July 6 | @ Twins | 2–4 (10) | May (5–7) | **Hunter** (0–1) | — | 23,213 | 43–40 | L1 |
| 84 | July 7 | @ Twins | 3–8 | Gibson (7–6) | **Gausman** (1–1) | — | 25,091 | 43–41 | L2 |
| 85 | July 8 | @ Twins | 3–5 | Milone (5–1) | **Norris** (2–9) | Perkins (28) | 29,289 | 43–42 | L3 |
| 86 | July 10 | Nationals | 3–2 | **Britton** (1–0) | Roark (4–4) | — | 46,289 | 44–42 | W1 |
| 87 | July 11 | Nationals | 4–7 | Zimmermann (8–5) | **González** (7–6) | Storen (26) | 44,495 | 44–43 | L1 |
| 88 | July 12 | Nationals | 2–3 | Scherzer (10–7) | **Chen** (4–5) | Storen (27) | 46,247 | 44–44 | L2 |
| ASG | July 14 | @ Great American Ball Park | AL 6–3 NL | Price (1–0) | Kershaw (0–1) | — | 43,656 | — | Box |
| 89 | July 17 | @ Tigers | 3–7 | Sánchez (9–7) | **Jiménez** (7–5) | — | 36,378 | 44–45 | L3 |
| 90 | July 18 | @ Tigers | 3–0 | **Tillman** (7–7) | Price (9–3) | **Britton** (24) | 40,033 | 45–45 | W1 |
| 91 | July 19 | @ Tigers | 9–3 | **González** (8–6) | Verlander (0–3) | — | 39,978 | 46–45 | W2 |
| 92 | July 21 | @ Yankees | 2–3 | Wilson (3–0) | **Chen** (4–6) | Miller (21) | 37,993 | 46–46 | L1 |
| 93 | July 22 | @ Yankees | 3–4 | Nova (2–3) | **Gausman** (1–2) | Miller (22) | 43,887 | 46–47 | L2 |
| 94 | July 23 | @ Yankees | 3–9 | Tanaka (7–3) | **Jiménez** (7–6) | — | 46,875 | 46–48 | L3 |
| 95 | July 24 | @ Rays | 1–3 | Colomé (4–4) | **O'Day** (5–1) | McGee (5) | 17,838 | 46–49 | L4 |
| 96 | July 25 | @ Rays | 5–1 | **González** (9–6) | Ramírez (8–4) | — | 24,327 | 47–49 | W1 |
| 97 | July 26 | @ Rays | 5–2 | **Chen** (5–6) | Moore (1–2) | **Britton** (25) | 18,613 | 48–49 | W2 |
| 98 | July 27 | Braves | 2–1 (11) | **Brach** (4–2) | Avilán (2–4) | — | 26,256 | 49–49 | W3 |
| 99 | July 28 | Braves | 7–3 | **Jiménez** (8–6) | Teherán (6–6) | — | 28,592 | 50–49 | W4 |
| 100 | July 29 | Braves | 2–0 | **Tillman** (8–7) | Foltynewicz (3–3) | **Britton** (26) | 29,328 | 51–49 | W5 |
| 101 | July 30 | Tigers | 8–9 | Simón (10–6) | **González** (9–7) | Wilson (1) | 30,136 | 51–50 | L1 |
| 102 | July 31 | Tigers | 8–7 | **Givens** (1–0) | Valdez (0–1) | **Britton** (27) | 36,985 | 52–50 | W1 |

August: 11–18 (Home: 6–7; Away: 5–11)

| # | Date | Opponent | Score | Win | Loss | Save | Attendance | Record | Box/ Streak |
|---|---|---|---|---|---|---|---|---|---|
| 103 | August 1 | Tigers | 6–2 | **Gausman** (2–2) | Sánchez (10–9) | — | 45,968 | 53–50 | W2 |
| 104 | August 2 | Tigers | 1–6 | Norris (2–1) | **Jiménez** (8–7) | — | 33,381 | 53–51 | L1 |
| 105 | August 3 | @ Athletics | 9–2 | **Wilson** (1–1) | Chavez (5–11) | — | 11,476 | 54–51 | W1 |
| 106 | August 4 | @ Athletics | 0–5 | Bassitt (1–4) | **González** (9–8) | — | 16,328 | 54–52 | L1 |
| 107 | August 5 | @ Athletics | 7–3 (10) | **Britton** (2–0) | León (0–1) | — | 20,176 | 55–52 | W1 |
| 108 | August 7 | @ Angels | 4–8 | Salas (2–1) | **Gausman** (2–3) | — | 42,578 | 55–53 | L1 |
| 109 | August 8 | @ Angels | 5–0 | **Jiménez** (9–7) | Richards (11–9) | — | 43,041 | 56–53 | W1 |
| 110 | August 9 | @ Angels | 4–5 (11) | Gott (2–0) | **Roe** (2–2) | — | 37,154 | 56–54 | L1 |
| 111 | August 10 | @ Mariners | 3–2 | **Chen** (6–6) | Nuño (0–2) | **Britton** (28) | 20,839 | 57–54 | W1 |
| 112 | August 11 | @ Mariners | 4–5 (10) | Rodney (5–4) | **McFarland** (0–2) | — | 24,863 | 57–55 | L1 |
| 113 | August 12 | @ Mariners | 0–3 | Iwakuma (4–2) | **Gausman** (2–4) | — | 25,661 | 57–56 | L2 |
| 114 | August 14 | Athletics | 8–6 (13) | **Garcia** (1–0) | Pomeranz (4–5) | — | 36,784 | 58–56 | W1 |
| 115 | August 15 | Athletics | 4–3 | **Britton** (3–0) | Venditte (0–1) | — | 44,028 | 59–56 | W2 |
| 116 | August 16 | Athletics | 18–2 | **Chen** (7–6) | Graveman (6–9) | — | 28,228 | 60–56 | W3 |
| 117 | August 17 | Athletics | 4–2 | **Tillman** (9–7) | Gray (12–5) | **Britton** (29) | 22,766 | 61–56 | W4 |
| 118 | August 18 | Mets | 3–5 | deGrom (12–6) | **Gausman** (2–5) | Familia (33) | 34,068 | 61–57 | L1 |
| 119 | August 19 | Mets | 5–4 | **Britton** (4–0) | Torres (4–5) | — | 36,165 | 62–57 | W1 |
| 120 | August 20 | Twins | 2–15 | Duffey (2–1) | **González** (9–9) | — | 20,109 | 62–58 | L1 |
| 121 | August 21 | Twins | 3–4 | Fien (3–5) | **O'Day** (5–2) | Jepsen (6) | 32,025 | 62–59 | L2 |
| 122 | August 22 | Twins | 2–3 | Fien (4–5) | **Tillman** (9–8) | Jepsen (7) | 35,301 | 62–60 | L3 |
| 123 | August 23 | Twins | 3–4 (12) | Perkins (2–4) | **Matusz** (1–3) | Milone (1) | 35,144 | 62–61 | L4 |
| 124 | August 24 | @ Royals | 3–8 | Melden (2–0) | **Jiménez** (9–8) | — | 27,797 | 62–62 | L5 |
| 125 | August 25 | @ Royals | 2–3 | Duffy (7–6) | **González** (9–10) | Davis (12) | 29,734 | 62–63 | L6 |
| 126 | August 26 | @ Royals | 8–5 | **Chen** (8–6) | Cueto (9–9) | **Britton** (30) | 33,003 | 63–63 | W1 |
| 127 | August 27 | @ Royals | 3–5 | Ventura (9–7) | **Tillman** (9–9) | — | 31,155 | 63–64 | L1 |
| 128 | August 28 | @ Rangers | 1–4 | Hamels (8–8) | **Gausman** (2–6) | Tolleson (27) | 28,337 | 63–65 | L2 |
| 129 | August 29 | @ Rangers | 3–4 | Pérez (2–3) | **Jiménez** (9–9) | Tolleson (28) | 29,768 | 63–66 | L3 |
| 130 | August 30 | @ Rangers | 0–6 | Holland (2–1) | **González** (9–11) | — | 22,256 | 63–67 | L4 |
| 131 | August 31 | Rays | 3–6 | Archer (12–10) | **Chen** (8–7) | Boxberger (33) | 19,841 | 63–68 | L5 |

September/October: 18–13 (Home: 10–5; Away: 8–8)

| # | Date | Opponent | Score | Win | Loss | Save | Attendance | Record | Box/ Streak |
|---|---|---|---|---|---|---|---|---|---|
| 132 | September 1 | Rays | 2–11 | Smyly (2–2) | **Tillman** (9–10) | — | 22,987 | 63–69 | L6 |
| 133 | September 2 | Rays | 7–6 | **Brach** (5–2) | Andriese (3–5) | — | 15,963 | 64–69 | W1 |
| 134 | September 4 | @ Blue Jays | 10–2 | **Jiménez** (10–9) | Hutchison (13–3) | — | 46,201 | 65–69 | W2 |
| 135 | September 5 | @ Blue Jays | 1–5 | Price (14–5) | **Wright** (2–4) | — | 46,373 | 65–70 | L1 |
| 136 | September 6 | @ Blue Jays | 4–10 | Estrada (12–8) | **Tillman** (9–11) | — | 46,136 | 65–71 | L2 |
| 137 | September 7 | @ Yankees | 6–8 | Wilson (5–0) | **Rondón** (0–1) | Miller (32) | 31,039 | 65–72 | L3 |
| 138 | September 8 | @ Yankees | 2–1 | **O'Day** (6–2) | Shreve (6–2) | **Britton** (31) | 30,785 | 66–72 | W1 |
| 139 | September 9 | @ Yankees | 5–3 | **Jiménez** (11–9) | Warren (6–6) | **Britton** (32) | 30,038 | 67–72 | W2 |
| 140 | September 11 | Royals | 14–8 | **Givens** (2–0) | Herrera (4–3) | — | 45,420 | 68–72 | W3 |
| 141 | September 12 | Royals | 6–14 | Ventura (11–8) | **Matusz** (1–4) | — | 35,439 | 68–73 | L1 |
| 142 | September 13 | Royals | 8–2 | **Chen** (9–7) | Cueto (9–12) | — | 22,496 | 69–73 | W1 |
| 143 | September 14 | Red Sox | 2–0 | **Gausman** (3–6) | Rodríguez (9–6) | **Britton** (33) | 19,666 | 70–73 | W2 |
| 144 | September 15 | Red Sox | 6–5 | **Roe** (3–2) | Aro (0–1) | — | 21,260 | 71–73 | W3 |
| 145 | September 16 | Red Sox | 1–10 | Owens (3–2) | **Wright** (2–5) | — | 22,642 | 71–74 | L1 |
| 146 | September 17 | @ Rays | 4–3 | **Roe** (4–2) | Colomé (6–5) | **O'Day** (3) | 9,617 | 72–74 | W1 |
| 147 | September 18 | @ Rays | 6–8 | Smyly (3–2) | **Wilson** (2–2) | Boxberger (35) | 10,697 | 72–75 | L1 |
| 148 | September 19 | @ Rays | 2–1 | **Chen** (10–7) | Ramírez (10–6) | **Britton** (34) | 17,053 | 73–75 | W1 |
| 149 | September 20 | @ Rays | 6–7 | Yates (1–0) | **Britton** (4–1) | — | 17,801 | 73–76 | L1 |
| — | September 21 | @ Nationals | Postponed (rain). Makeup date September 24. | | | | | | |
| 150 | September 22 | @ Nationals | 4–1 | **Jiménez** (12–9) | Gonzalez (11–8) | O'Day (4) | 27,338 | 74–76 | W1 |
| 151 | September 23 | @ Nationals | 4–3 | **Tillman** (10–11) | Scherzer (12–12) | **O'Day** (5) | 27,991 | 75–76 | W2 |
| 152 | September 24 | @ Nationals | 5–4 | **Wright** (3–5) | Treinen (2–4) | O'Day (6) | 28,456 | 76–76 | W3 |
| 153 | September 25 | @ Red Sox | 0–7 | Hill (2–0) | **Gausman** (3–7) | — | 32,411 | 76–77 | L1 |
| 154 | September 26 | @ Red Sox | 0–8 | Hembree (2–0) | **Chen** (10–8) | — | 36,316 | 76–78 | L2 |
| 155 | September 27 | @ Red Sox | 0–2 | Owens (4–3) | **Jiménez** (12–10) | Ross (6) | 33,306 | 76–79 | L3 |
| 156 | September 28 | Blue Jays | 3–4 | Cecil (5–5) | **Brach** (5–3) | Osuna (20) | 19,093 | 76–80 | L4 |
| — | September 29 | Blue Jays | Postponed (rain). Makeup date September 30 as part of doubleheader. | | | | | | |
| 157 | September 30 | Blue Jays | 2–15 | Stroman (4–0) | **González** (9–12) | — | 26,330 (Note: Single-Admission Doubleheader) | 76–81 | L5 |
| 158 | September 30 | Blue Jays | 8–1 | **Gausman** (4–7) | Tepera (0–2) | — | 26,330 | 77–81 | W1 |
| 159 | October 1 | Blue Jays | 6–4 | **McFarland** (1–2) | Hutchison (13–5) | **Britton** (35) | 18,257 | 78–81 | W2 |
| — | October 2 | Yankees | Postponed (rain). Makeup date October 3 as part of doubleheader. | | | | | | |
| 160 | October 3 | Yankees | 9–2 | **Chen** (11–8) | Nova (6–11) | — | 29,227 | 79–81 | W3 |
| 161 | October 3 | Yankees | 4–3 | **McFarland** (2–2) | Betances (6–4) | **Britton** (36) | 35,198 | 80–81 | W4 |
| 162 | October 4 | Yankees | 9–4 | **Tillman** (11–11) | Pineda (12–10) | — | 33,224 | 81–81 | W5 |

== Statistics ==
=== Batting ===
Note: G = Games played; AB = At bats; R = Runs scored; H = Hits; 2B = Doubles; 3B = Triples; HR = Home runs; RBI = Runs batted in; BB = Base on balls; SO = Strikeouts; AVG = Batting average; SB = Stolen bases

| Player | G | AB | R | H | 2B | 3B | HR | RBI | BB | SO | AVG | SB |
|---|---|---|---|---|---|---|---|---|---|---|---|---|
| Dariel Álvarez, RF | 12 | 29 | 3 | 7 | 1 | 0 | 1 | 1 | 2 | 8 | .241 | 0 |
| Everth Cabrera, SS | 29 | 96 | 7 | 20 | 2 | 0 | 0 | 4 | 5 | 22 | .208 | 2 |
| Steve Clevenger, C, DH | 30 | 101 | 11 | 29 | 4 | 2 | 2 | 15 | 4 | 13 | .287 | 0 |
| Chris Davis, 1B, DH | 160 | 573 | 100 | 150 | 31 | 0 | 47 | 117 | 84 | 208 | .262 | 2 |
| Alejandro De Aza, OF | 30 | 103 | 16 | 22 | 4 | 1 | 3 | 7 | 7 | 34 | .214 | 2 |
| Ryan Flaherty, 2B | 91 | 267 | 34 | 54 | 8 | 3 | 9 | 31 | 26 | 81 | .202 | 0 |
| Jason Garcia, P | 21 | 0 | 0 | 0 | 0 | 0 | 0 | 0 | 1 | 0 | .000 | 0 |
| Miguel González, P | 26 | 1 | 0 | 0 | 0 | 0 | 0 | 0 | 0 | 0 | .000 | 0 |
| J. J. Hardy, SS | 114 | 411 | 45 | 90 | 14 | 0 | 8 | 37 | 20 | 88 | .219 | 0 |
| Paul Janish, SS | 14 | 35 | 4 | 10 | 3 | 0 | 0 | 3 | 0 | 3 | .286 | 0 |
| Ubaldo Jiménez, P | 32 | 8 | 0 | 2 | 0 | 0 | 0 | 2 | 0 | 4 | .250 | 0 |
| Adam Jones, CF | 137 | 546 | 74 | 147 | 25 | 3 | 27 | 82 | 24 | 102 | .269 | 3 |
| Caleb Joseph, C | 100 | 320 | 38 | 75 | 16 | 1 | 11 | 49 | 27 | 72 | .234 | 0 |
| Junior Lake, OF | 8 | 22 | 2 | 3 | 3 | 0 | 0 | 0 | 0 | 9 | .136 | 0 |
| Ryan Lavarnway, C | 10 | 28 | 1 | 3 | 1 | 0 | 0 | 0 | 4 | 7 | .107 | 0 |
| David Lough, LF | 84 | 134 | 14 | 27 | 1 | 1 | 4 | 12 | 5 | 36 | .201 | 2 |
| Manny Machado, 3B | 162 | 633 | 102 | 181 | 30 | 1 | 35 | 86 | 70 | 111 | .286 | 20 |
| Rey Navarro, 2B | 10 | 29 | 5 | 8 | 2 | 0 | 1 | 3 | 0 | 3 | .276 | 0 |
| Bud Norris, P | 18 | 4 | 0 | 0 | 0 | 0 | 0 | 0 | 0 | 1 | .000 | 0 |
| Jimmy Paredes, DH | 104 | 363 | 46 | 100 | 17 | 2 | 10 | 42 | 19 | 111 | .275 | 4 |
| Chris Parmelee, 1B | 32 | 97 | 11 | 21 | 7 | 1 | 4 | 9 | 4 | 26 | .216 | 0 |
| Gerardo Parra, RF | 55 | 224 | 30 | 53 | 12 | 0 | 5 | 20 | 8 | 35 | .237 | 5 |
| Steve Pearce, OF, 1B, 2B | 92 | 294 | 42 | 64 | 13 | 1 | 15 | 40 | 23 | 69 | .218 | 1 |
| Nolan Reimold, LF | 61 | 170 | 24 | 42 | 5 | 1 | 6 | 20 | 23 | 47 | .247 | 0 |
| Jonathan Schoop, 2B | 86 | 305 | 34 | 85 | 17 | 0 | 15 | 39 | 9 | 79 | .279 | 2 |
| Chris Tillman, P | 31 | 2 | 0 | 0 | 0 | 0 | 0 | 0 | 0 | 2 | .000 | 0 |
| Henry Urrutia, LF | 10 | 34 | 3 | 9 | 1 | 0 | 1 | 6 | 2 | 3 | .265 | 0 |
| Christian Walker, DH, 1B | 7 | 9 | 0 | 1 | 0 | 0 | 0 | 0 | 3 | 4 | .111 | 0 |
| Matt Wieters, C | 75 | 258 | 24 | 69 | 14 | 1 | 8 | 25 | 21 | 67 | .267 | 0 |
| Tyler Wilson, P | 9 | 2 | 0 | 0 | 0 | 0 | 0 | 0 | 0 | 0 | .000 | 0 |
| Mike Wright, P | 12 | 2 | 0 | 1 | 0 | 0 | 0 | 0 | 0 | 1 | .500 | 0 |
| Delmon Young, RF | 52 | 174 | 20 | 47 | 6 | 0 | 2 | 16 | 4 | 29 | .270 | 0 |
| Team totals | 162 | 5485 | 713 | 1370 | 246 | 20 | 217 | 686 | 418 | 1331 | .250 | 44 |

=== Pitching ===
Note: W = Wins; L = Losses; ERA = Earned run average; G = Games pitched; GS = Games started; SV = Saves; IP = Innings pitched; H = Hits allowed; R = Runs allowed; ER = Earned runs allowed; HR = Home runs allowed; BB = Walks allowed; K = Strikeouts

| Player | W | L | ERA | G | GS | SV | IP | H | R | ER | HR | BB | K |
|---|---|---|---|---|---|---|---|---|---|---|---|---|---|
| Brad Brach | 5 | 3 | 2.72 | 62 | 0 | 1 | 79.1 | 57 | 25 | 24 | 7 | 38 | 89 |
| Zach Britton | 4 | 1 | 1.92 | 64 | 0 | 36 | 65.2 | 51 | 16 | 14 | 3 | 14 | 79 |
| César Cabral | 0 | 0 | 0.00 | 2 | 0 | 0 | 1.0 | 0 | 0 | 0 | 0 | 1 | 1 |
| Wei-Yin Chen | 11 | 8 | 3.34 | 31 | 31 | 0 | 191.1 | 192 | 78 | 71 | 28 | 41 | 153 |
| Oliver Drake | 0 | 0 | 2.87 | 13 | 0 | 0 | 15.2 | 16 | 7 | 5 | 1 | 9 | 17 |
| Jason Garcia | 1 | 0 | 4.25 | 21 | 0 | 0 | 29.2 | 25 | 19 | 14 | 3 | 17 | 22 |
| Kevin Gausman | 4 | 7 | 4.25 | 25 | 17 | 0 | 112.1 | 109 | 56 | 53 | 17 | 29 | 103 |
| Mychal Givens | 2 | 0 | 1.80 | 22 | 0 | 0 | 30.0 | 20 | 7 | 6 | 1 | 6 | 38 |
| Miguel González | 9 | 12 | 4.91 | 26 | 26 | 0 | 144.2 | 151 | 81 | 79 | 24 | 51 | 109 |
| Tommy Hunter | 2 | 2 | 3.63 | 39 | 0 | 0 | 42.2 | 41 | 19 | 18 | 3 | 11 | 32 |
| Ubaldo Jiménez | 12 | 10 | 4.11 | 32 | 32 | 0 | 184.0 | 182 | 89 | 84 | 20 | 68 | 168 |
| Steve Johnson | 0 | 0 | 10.13 | 6 | 0 | 0 | 5.1 | 8 | 6 | 6 | 2 | 5 | 3 |
| Brian Matusz | 1 | 4 | 2.94 | 58 | 0 | 0 | 49.0 | 38 | 18 | 16 | 5 | 20 | 56 |
| T. J. McFarland | 2 | 2 | 4.91 | 30 | 0 | 0 | 40.1 | 52 | 26 | 22 | 4 | 18 | 26 |
| Bud Norris | 2 | 9 | 7.06 | 18 | 11 | 0 | 66.1 | 84 | 57 | 42 | 14 | 25 | 50 |
| Darren O'Day | 6 | 2 | 1.52 | 68 | 0 | 6 | 65.1 | 47 | 13 | 11 | 5 | 14 | 82 |
| Chaz Roe | 4 | 2 | 4.14 | 36 | 0 | 0 | 41.1 | 44 | 19 | 19 | 4 | 17 | 38 |
| Jorge Rondón | 0 | 1 | 7.43 | 8 | 0 | 0 | 13.1 | 20 | 15 | 11 | 3 | 6 | 8 |
| Chris Tillman | 11 | 11 | 4.99 | 31 | 31 | 0 | 173.0 | 176 | 97 | 96 | 20 | 64 | 120 |
| Tyler Wilson | 2 | 2 | 3.50 | 9 | 5 | 0 | 36.0 | 39 | 14 | 14 | 1 | 11 | 13 |
| Mike Wright | 3 | 5 | 6.04 | 12 | 9 | 0 | 44.2 | 52 | 30 | 30 | 9 | 18 | 26 |
| Wesley Wright | 0 | 0 | 5.40 | 2 | 0 | 0 | 1.2 | 2 | 1 | 1 | 0 | 0 | 0 |
| Team totals | 81 | 81 | 4.05 | 162 | 162 | 43 | 1434.2 | 1406 | 693 | 646 | 174 | 483 | 1233 |

== Accolades ==
The following players represented the Orioles in the 2015 Major League Baseball All-Star Game

- Zach Britton
- Adam Jones
- Manny Machado
- Darren O'Day

Manny Machado won the AL Rawlings Gold Glove Award

== Roster ==
2015 Baltimore Orioles
Roster
| Pitchers: 35 Brad Brach; 53 Zach Britton; 58 César Cabral; 16 Wei-Yin Chen; 71 Oliver Drake; 61 Jason Garcia; 39 Kevin Gausman; 60 Mychal Givens; 50 Miguel González; 29 Tommy Hunter; 31 Ubaldo Jiménez; 52 Steve Johnson; 17 Brian Matusz; 66 T. J. McFarland; 25 Bud Norris; 56 Darren O'Day; 65 Chaz Roe; 57 Jorge Rondón; 30 Chris Tillman; 63 Tyler Wilson; 59 Mike Wright; 40 Wesley Wright | Catchers: 45 Steve Clevenger; 36 Caleb Joseph; 60,34 Ryan Lavarnway; 32 Matt Wieters; Infielders: 1 Everth Cabrera; 19 Chris Davis; 3 Ryan Flaherty; 2 J. J. Hardy; 15 Paul Janish; 13 Manny Machado; 43 Rey Navarro; 38 Jimmy Paredes; 41 Chris Parmelee; 6 Jonathan Schoop; 34 Christian Walker | Outfielders: 12 Dariel Álvarez; 12 Alejandro De Aza; 10 Adam Jones; 48 Junior Lake; 9 David Lough; 18 Gerardo Parra; 28 Steve Pearce; 14 Nolan Reimold; 23 Travis Snider; 51 Henry Urrutia; 27 Delmon Young | Manager: 26 Buck Showalter; Coaches: 72 Rudy Árias (bullpen catcher); 54 Dom Chiti (bullpen); 47 Scott Coolbaugh (hitting); 55 Einar Díaz (assistant hitting); 11 Bobby Dickerson (third base); 24 Wayne Kirby (first base); 77 John Russell (bench); 37 Dave Wallace (pitching) |

== Farm system ==
| Level | Team | League | Manager |
|---|---|---|---|
| AAA | Norfolk Tides | International League | Ron Johnson |
| AA | Bowie Baysox | Eastern League | Gary Kendall |
| A-Advanced | Frederick Keys | Carolina League | Orlando Gómez |
| A | Delmarva Shorebirds | South Atlantic League | Ryan Minor |
| A-Short Season | Aberdeen IronBirds | New York–Penn League | Luis Pujols |
| Rookie | GCL Orioles | Gulf Coast League | Orlando Gómez |
| Rookie | DSL Orioles 1 & 2 | Dominican Summer League | Elvis Morel & Nelson Norman |

LEAGUE CHAMPIONS: Bowie
