= Lastings Milledge =

American baseball player (born 1985)

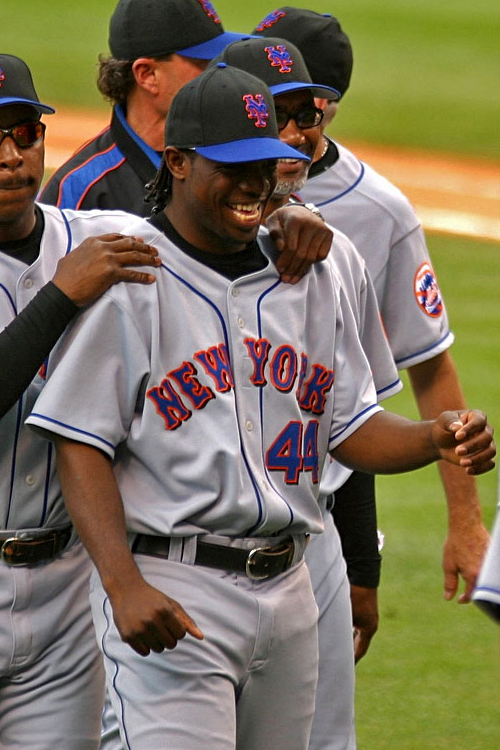
- Milledge with the New York Mets in 2006
- Outfielder
- Born: April 5, 1985 (age 41); Bradenton, Florida, U.S.
- Batted: Right Threw: Right

Professional debut
- MLB: May 30, 2006, for the New York Mets
- NPB: March 30, 2012, for the Tokyo Yakult Swallows

Last appearance
- MLB: April 6, 2011, for the Chicago White Sox
- NPB: September 13, 2015, for the Tokyo Yakult Swallows

MLB statistics
- Batting average: .269
- Home runs: 33
- Runs batted in: 167

NPB statistics
- Batting average: .272
- Home runs: 39
- Runs batted in: 129
- Stats at Baseball Reference

Teams
- New York Mets (2006–2007); Washington Nationals (2008–2009); Pittsburgh Pirates (2009–2010); Chicago White Sox (2011); Tokyo Yakult Swallows (2012–2015)
Medals
Men's baseball
Representing United States
World Youth Baseball Championship
Gold medal – first place	2001 Monterrey	Team
World Junior Baseball Championship
Bronze medal – third place	2002 Sherbrooke	Team

Lastings Darnell Milledge (born April 5, 1985) is an American former professional baseball outfielder. He played in Major League Baseball (MLB) for the New York Mets, Washington Nationals, Pittsburgh Pirates, and Chicago White Sox and in Nippon Professional Baseball (NPB) for the Yakult Swallows. He was the youngest player in MLB's National League during his rookie season in 2006.

== Early life ==
Milledge was born in Bradenton, Florida. At the age of twelve, he pitched and played third base and hit third for the Manatee East Little League team that was the national runner-up in the 1997 Little League World Series. He received the win on the mound in the semi-final game of the regional, giving up only one run on a solo home run to Matt Rigney in a win against Mississippi. In 2001, he led Team USA to a gold medal game victory over Venezuela in the International Baseball Federation's AA World Youth Championships. Later that year, Baseball America named Milledge the best 16-year-old player in the United States. He graduated from Lakewood Ranch High School in Bradenton, Florida in 2003 after leading his team to the state 5A title his senior year.

== Amateur draft ==
Prior to the 2003 amateur draft, he was expected to be among the top three selections, but as draft day approached, press reports from 2002 resurfaced regarding Milledge's expulsion from Northside Christian School after his junior year for allegedly having sex with a minor. He subsequently transferred to Lakewood Ranch High School where he finished his education and amateur baseball career.

As a result of the incident, Milledge was passed over in the 2003 amateur draft until the Mets selected him as the twelfth overall pick in the first round. The Mets began contract negotiations with Milledge, but the talks were interrupted in early August 2003, when the Mets learned of allegations of additional sexual misconduct against Milledge during his time at Northside. The Mets completed a private investigation of the matter and, satisfied with the results, signed Milledge to a contract with a $2.2 million signing bonus.

== Playing career ==
=== Minor league career ===
The delay in signing Milledge prevented him from beginning his professional career until shortly before the end of the minor league season in 2003. He appeared in only seven games, hitting .231 for the Kingsport Mets of the Appalachian League. In 2004, he was slated to start the year with the Single–A Capital City Bombers, but he suffered a fractured metacarpal on his right hand in spring training, missing the first six weeks of the season. In 65 games with the Bombers, he hit .337 with 13 home runs, 58 RBI and 23 stolen bases, earning him a promotion to the St. Lucie Mets in August. In 2005, he continued his minor league success hitting .302 with St. Lucie in the first half of the season and .337 with the Double–A Binghamton Mets in the second half. He began the 2006 season leading off and playing right field for the Triple–A Norfolk Tides.

=== New York Mets ===
==== Rookie season ====
Milledge made his major league debut on May 30, 2006, as the starting right fielder for the Mets in a 7–2 loss to the Arizona Diamondbacks. He went 1 for 4 with a double off Arizona pitcher Miguel Batista. Milledge was 21 years, 55 days old on the day of his debut - exactly the same age as former Met Darryl Strawberry when he made his 1983 debut. In his three separate stints in the majors in 2006, Milledge hit .241 with 4 HR and 22 RBI in 56 games.

On June 4, 2006 against the San Francisco Giants, Milledge hit a solo home run – his first major league career homer – off Giants closer Armando Benítez to tie up the game 6–6 in the bottom of the tenth inning. When the Mets returned to the field the following inning, Milledge, still excited, high-fived the home fans in attendance at Shea as he returned to his position, inciting the ire of his manager and some teammates, as well as the national sports media. In late September, one of Milledge's Mets teammates placed a sign on his locker which read, "Know Your Place, Rook!" The sign-placer was identified in published reports as then-Mets closer Billy Wagner.

==== 2007 ====
After having an impressive spring training both on and off the field, Milledge was named to the Mets' opening day roster. He saw very limited game action, and was subsequently optioned down to AAA New Orleans after the game on April 12 to create room on the roster so that starting pitcher Mike Pelfrey could be called up and make his season debut in the following day's game.

In May, it was reported that Milledge appeared in a rap song, "Bend Ya Knees", by Manny D, a childhood friend. The song contained the words "bitch", "ho", and "nigga". The Mets organization responded by saying, "We disapprove of the content, language, and message of this recording, which does not represent the views of the New York Mets."

Upon his recovery from a foot injury, Milledge was called up to the major leagues after the All-Star break on July 12. Veteran Julio Franco was designated for assignment to make room for Milledge.

On November 30, 2007, Milledge was traded to the Washington Nationals for Ryan Church and Brian Schneider.

=== Washington Nationals ===
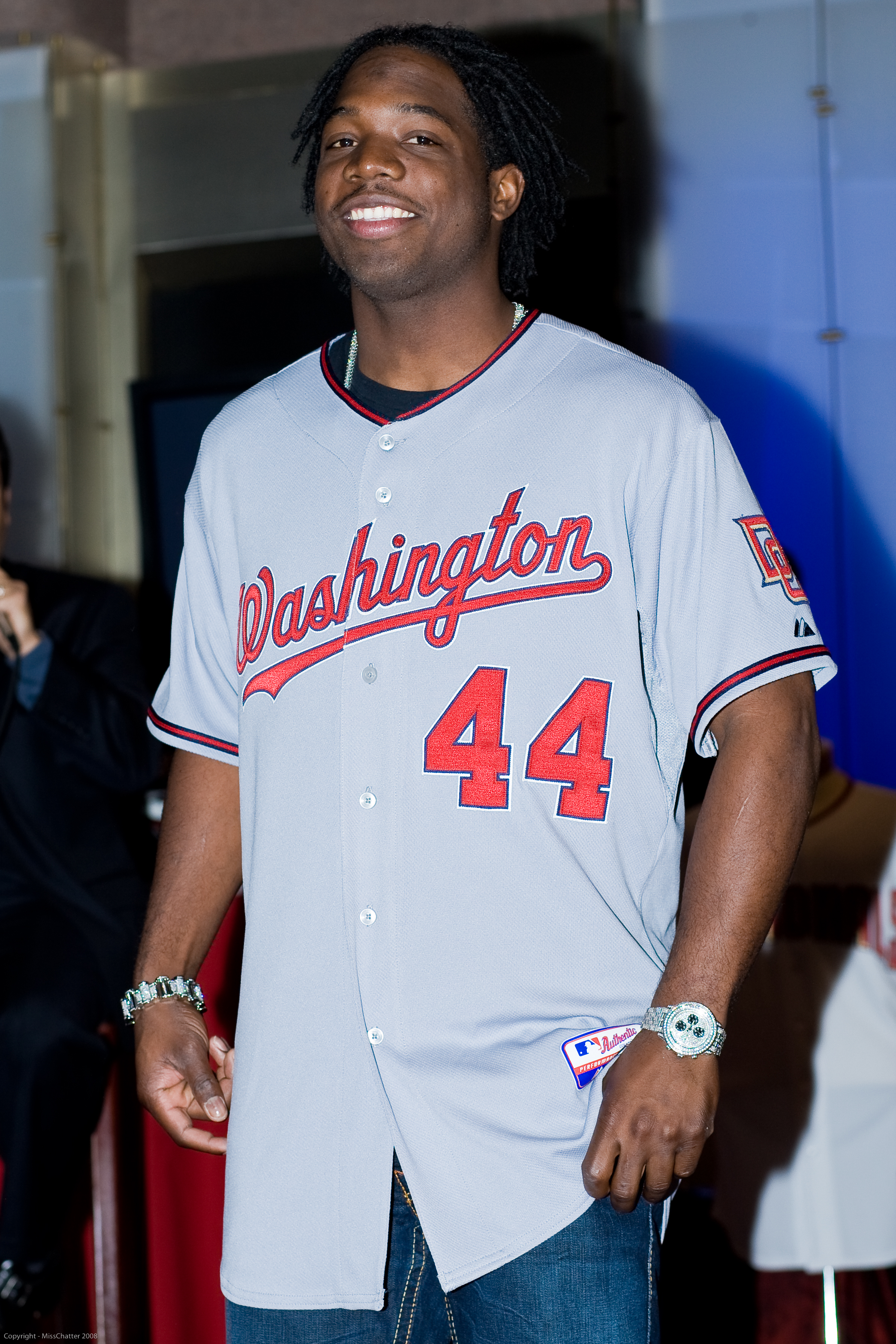
Milledge with the Nationals in 2008

==== 2008 ====
Milledge served as the everyday starting center fielder for the Nationals. Up until the end of June, he had been batting third in the lineup in place of the injured Ryan Zimmerman, posting a .245 average, 7 home runs, and 32 RBI for the season. However, on June 28, he suffered a groin strain, and he was placed on the disabled list the next day. Roger Bernadina was called up to take his place. On July 24, the Nationals activated Milledge from the DL and designated Johnny Estrada for assignment. Milledge went 2 for 18 in his first five games after his return. However, in the month of August, he batted .336 with 6 HR and 16 RBI.

==== 2009 ====
On February 19, Milledge willingly gave up his uniform number, 44 for Adam Dunn, wearing #85 as his birthyear. Milledge began the season as the Nationals' leadoff hitter. Because of his slow start, where he batted .167 with 1 RBI and no extra base hits in 24 at-bats, he was optioned down to AAA Syracuse on April 15, 2009. On June 30, 2009, the Nationals traded Milledge and Joel Hanrahan to the Pittsburgh Pirates for Nyjer Morgan and Sean Burnett.

=== Pittsburgh Pirates ===
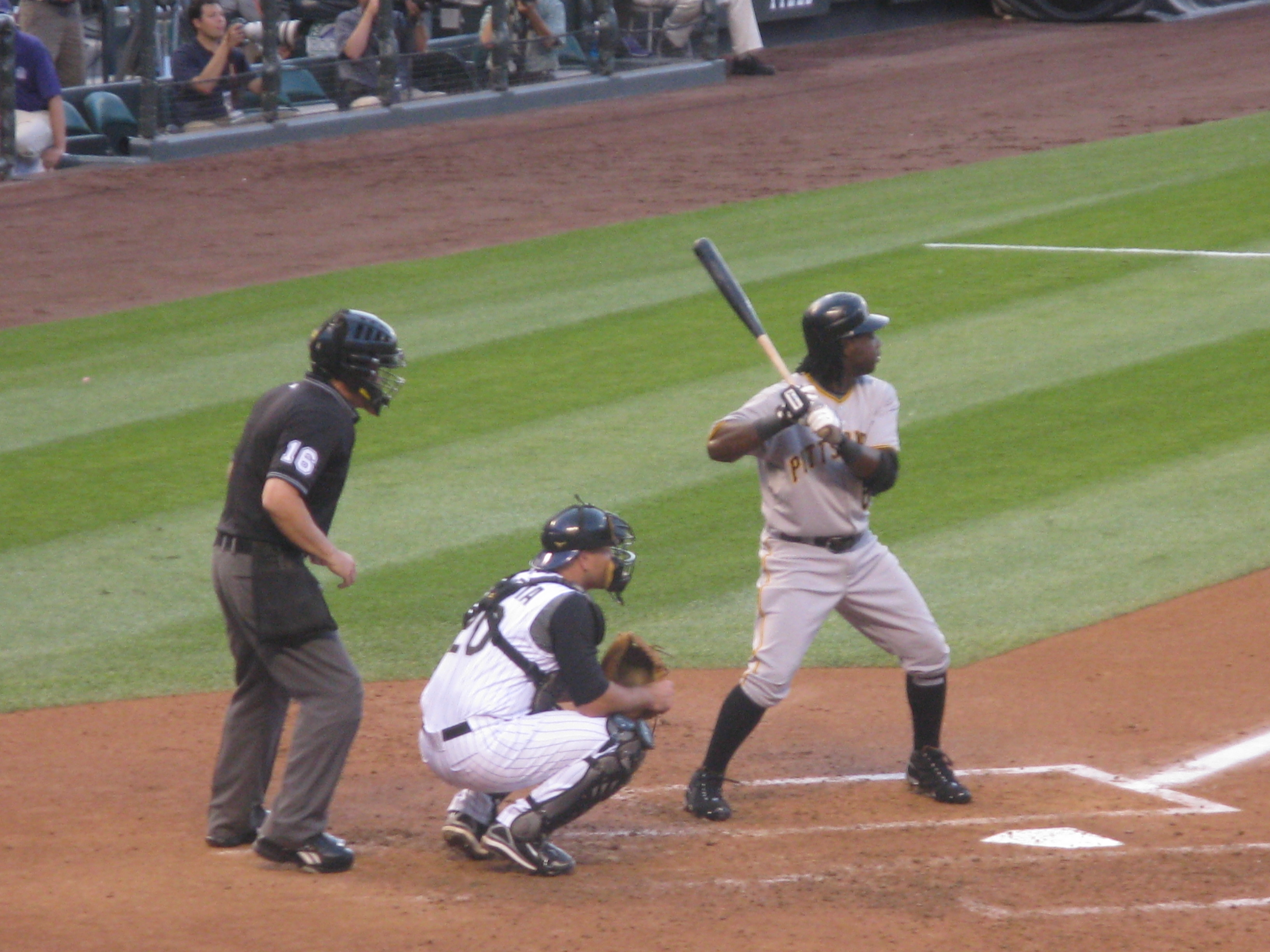
Milledge with the Pirates in 2009

==== 2009 ====
Milledge, still rehabbing from an injury that occurred at Triple–A Syracuse when the trade was made, was assigned to the Pirates' Gulf Coast League team in Bradenton, Florida to complete his rehab, and then moved to the Pirates' Triple–A affiliate, the Indianapolis Indians, with a short stint at the Lynchburg Hillcats during the Triple–A all-star break. After recovering from his injury he became the Pirates' everyday left fielder. He showed growth in his work ethic and his glove work improved. He finished a below par 2009 with 11 doubles, 0 triples, 4 home runs, 21 runs batted in, was walked 13 times, struck out 47 times, stole 7 bases, those went along with .276 average, a .323 on-base percentage, a .373 slugging percentage, in 244 at-bats.

==== 2010 ====
In the May 6 game against the Chicago Cubs, Milledge appeared to have hit his first home run of the season in the 4th inning. However, the ball actually hit the top of the left field wall in PNC Park and bounced back into play. As Milledge rounded first base, the stadium fireworks were set off and the celebration music began to play. Chicago outfielder Alfonso Soriano picked up the ball and threw it into the infield where Milledge was tagged out. Milledge was officially credited with a double on the play.

On December 2, 2010, Milledge became a free agent when the Pirates elected not to tender a contract offer to him for 2011.

=== Chicago White Sox ===
On February 3, 2011, the Chicago White Sox signed Milledge to a minor league deal. On March 30, 2011, the White Sox bought Milledge's minor league contract from the Charlotte Knights, and it was announced that he had made the Sox's 25-man opening day roster. However, on April 7, 2011, the Sox designated Milledge for assignment. He cleared waivers and accepted an outright assignment to Triple-A Charlotte. After the 2011 season, he elected free agency.

=== Tokyo Yakult Swallows ===
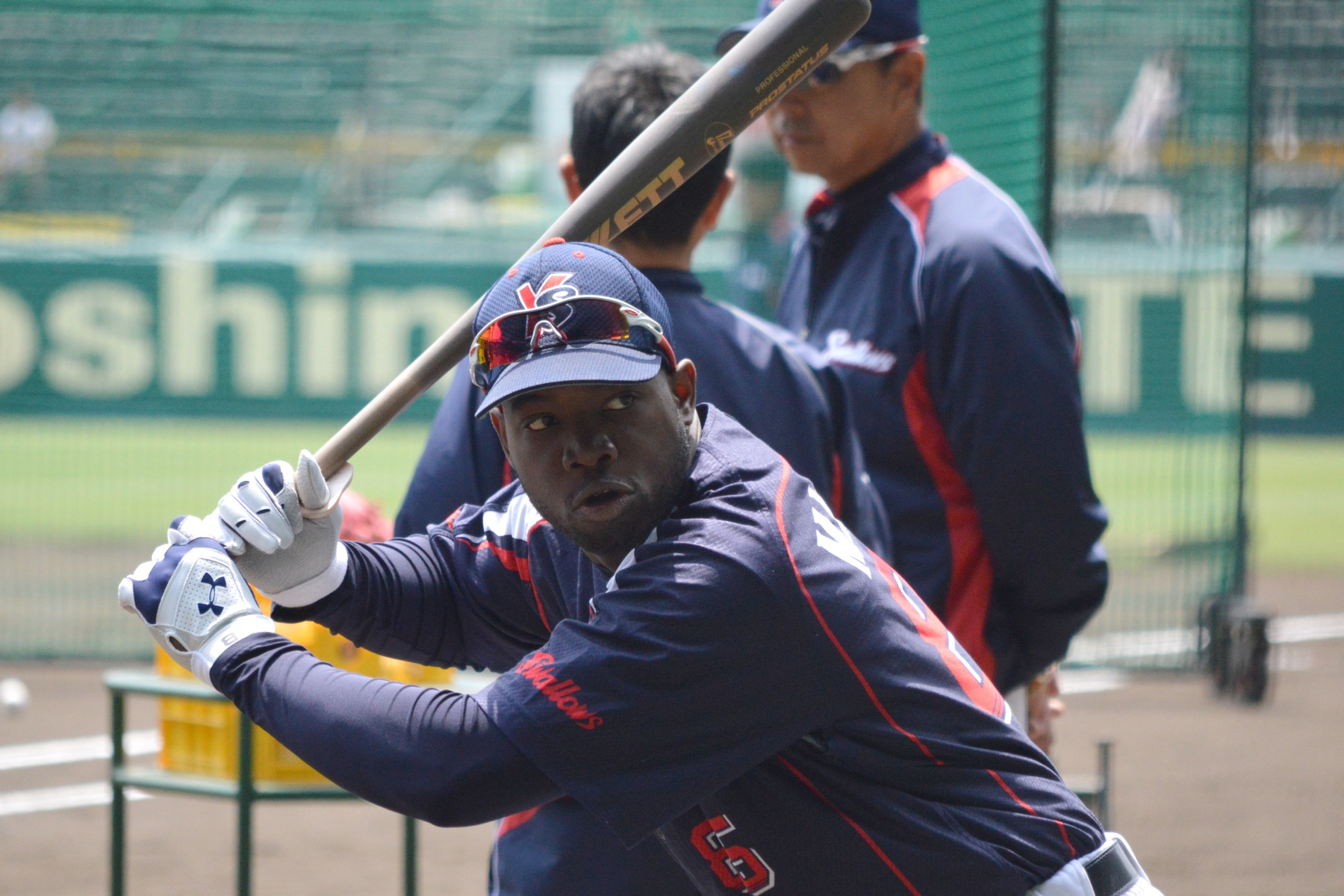
Milledge with the Swallows in 2013

==== 2012 ====
Milledge signed a one-year contract with a club option for a second year with the Tokyo Yakult Swallows on December 27, 2011. Milledge played in 125 games for the Swallows in 2012, hitting .300 with 21 HR and 65 RBI.

==== 2013-15 ====
Milledge signed a three-year, $4.4 million contract with the Tokyo Yakult Swallows. In four seasons with the Yakult Swallows through 2015, Milledge played in 255 games, batting .272 with 39 home runs and 129 RBI. Hampered by injuries in 2014–15, Milledge appeared in only a combined 34 games those years.

=== Lancaster Barnstormers ===
On January 24, 2017, Milledge signed with the Lancaster Barnstormers of the Atlantic League of Professional Baseball. He retired from professional baseball following the season. In 85 games he hit .270/.337/.338 with 1 home run, 36 RBIs and 14 stolen bases.

== Coaching career ==
On July 26, 2024, Milledge was named the hitting coach for the State College Spikes of the MLB Draft League.

== Personal life ==
Milledge is an advocate for increasing African-American participation in baseball. When he was an active player, he would spend his offseasons attending youth football and basketball games in an effort to convince black children to give baseball a try.

Following his retirement, Milledge opened Manatee Intercity Baseball in Bradenton, Florida, whose mission is to give minority kids an opportunity to learn and play the game. He also owns and operates 1st Round Training, a hitting and training facility in Palmetto, Florida, that aims to mentor and train young players.

In 2018, Milledge was married and was expecting his first child with his wife, DePree.
