= Lakewood Ranch High School =

Public high school in Manatee County, Florida, United States

Location
- 5500 Lakewood Ranch Blvd; Bradenton, Florida 34211; United States; 27°26′37″N 82°26′17″W

Information
- Type: Comprehensive public high school
- Opened: 1998; 28 years ago
- School district: Manatee County School District
- CEEB code: 100162
- NCES School ID: 120123003425
- Principal: Dustin Dahlquist
- Teaching staff: 96 (on an FTE basis)
- Grades: 9–12
- Enrollment: 2,422 (2024-2025)
- Student to teacher ratio: 25.23
- Colors: Silver, dark green, and black
- Website: www.manateeschools.net/o/lakewoodranch

Lakewood Ranch High School in Manatee County, Florida, United States, was opened in 1998 in Bradenton, Florida. It is named after the master planned community it borders, Lakewood Ranch.

In the 2011–2012 school year, Lakewood Ranch High School was awarded the two highest honors given by the Florida High School Athletic Association. The Mustangs placed first in the Academic Team Champions and the Floyd E. Lay Sunshine Cup, All Sports Award. Lakewood Ranch was the only public school in the State of Florida to win both awards.

== Notable alumni ==
- Colton Gordon (born 1998), baseball pitcher (MLB)
- Lastings Milledge, baseball player (MLB and NPB)
- Mike Ohlman, baseball catcher (MLB)
- Austin Reiter, football player (NFL)
- Dominique Rodgers-Cromartie, football player (NFL)
- Gus Schlosser (born 1988), baseball pitcher (MLB)
- Charles Trippy, vlogger and bassist for We The Kings
