= Mike Wright (baseball) =

American baseball player (born 1990)

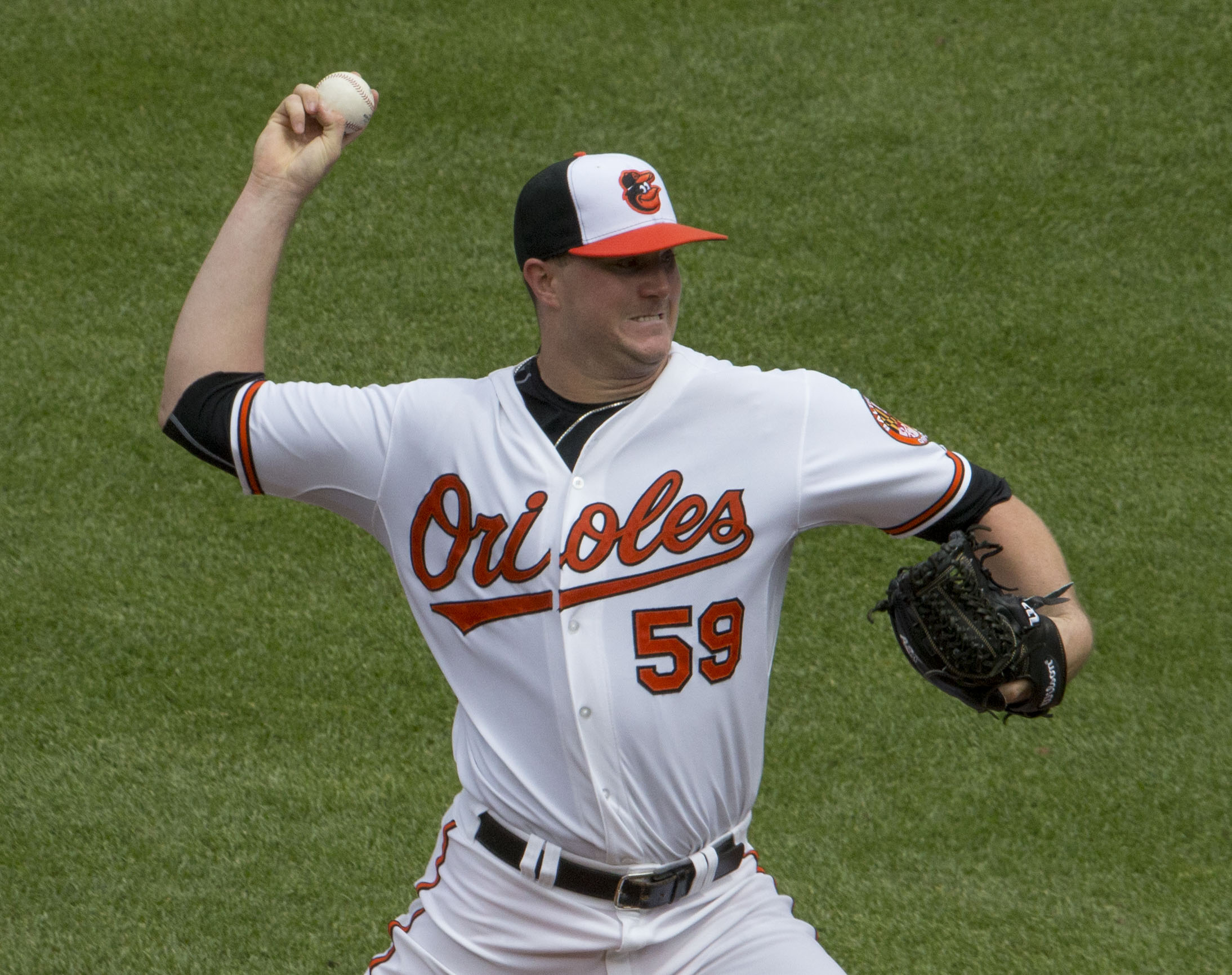
- Wright with the Baltimore Orioles
- Pitcher
- Born: January 3, 1990 (age 36); Bennettsville, South Carolina, U.S.
- Batted: Right Threw: Right

Professional debut
- MLB: May 17, 2015, for the Baltimore Orioles
- KBO: May 6, 2020, for the NC Dinos

Last appearance
- MLB: September 29, 2021, for the Chicago White Sox
- KBO: October 24, 2020, for the NC Dinos

MLB statistics
- Win–loss record: 10–13
- Earned run average: 5.97
- Strikeouts: 219

KBO statistics
- Win–loss record: 11–9
- Earned run average: 4.68
- Strikeouts: 125
- Stats at Baseball Reference

Teams
- Baltimore Orioles (2015–2019); Seattle Mariners (2019); NC Dinos (2020); Chicago White Sox (2021)

Career highlights and awards
- Korean Series champion (2020)

Dennis Michael Wright Jr. (born January 3, 1990) is an American former professional baseball pitcher. He played in Major League Baseball (MLB) for the Baltimore Orioles, Seattle Mariners, and Chicago White Sox, and in the KBO League for the NC Dinos. Wright played college baseball for East Carolina University.

== Amateur career ==
Wright attended Whiteville High School in Whiteville, North Carolina. He then attended East Carolina University. In 2010, he played collegiate summer baseball with the Harwich Mariners of the Cape Cod Baseball League.

== Professional career ==
=== Baltimore Orioles ===
He was selected by the Baltimore Orioles in the third round of the 2011 Major League Baseball draft. During his first professional season he went 3-2 with a 5.72 earned run average with 42 strikeouts in 45 2/3 innings. Pitching for the Frederick Keys and Bowie Baysox in 2012 he went 10-5 with a 4.06 ERA.

Wright started the 2013 season with Baysox. He finished the season with the Norfolk Tides. He was the Jim Palmer Minor League Pitcher of the Year Award after going 11–3 with a 3.11 ERA and 138 strikeouts. He returned to Norfolk to start the 2014 season.

==== 2015 ====
Wright made his first career major league start on May 17, 2015 against the Los Angeles Angels of Anaheim. He went 7 1/3 innings, striking out 6, allowed 4 hits, no runs, and no walks in order to get the win, 3-0. In 12 games, 9 of them starts, Wright went 3-5 with a 6.04 ERA in 44 2/3 innings.

==== 2016 ====
Wright was named the Orioles' fourth starter at the conclusion of Spring Training. He began in the rotation but struggled and was sent down to the minors. He split time between the O's rotation and the Triple–A level. In 18 games for the Orioles, 12 of them being in the rotation, Wright went 3-4 with a 5.79 ERA in 74 2/3 innings.

==== 2017 ====
Wright spent the majority of the season at the Triple–A level, receiving a promotion to the Majors towards the end of the season. He finished with a 5.76 ERA in 13 games.

==== 2018 ====
Wright pitched exclusively out of the bullpen for the O's, totaling 48 appearances. He finished with 84 1/3 innings pitched.

==== 2019 ====
Wright was on the Opening Day roster for the Orioles in 2019. He had an ERA of 9.45 through 10 appearances. On April 21, 2019, Wright was designated for assignment to make space for Gabriel Ynoa on the roster.

=== Seattle Mariners ===
On April 24, 2019, he was traded to the Seattle Mariners in exchange for infielder Ryne Ogren. He was designated for assignment on May 19, and later outrighted to the Triple-A Tacoma Rainiers. On June 23, Wright was called up by the Mariners. He pitched in nine games for the Mariners before he was designated for assignment again on July 5, and returned to Triple-A with Tacoma. He elected free agency on October 1.

=== NC Dinos ===
On November 22, 2019, Wright signed a one-year contract with the NC Dinos of the KBO League. He went 11–9 with a 4.68 ERA with 125 strikeouts across 29 starts for the Dinos. Wright became a free agent following the season.

=== Chicago White Sox ===
On December 24, 2020, Wright signed a minor league contract with the Chicago White Sox organization. He was assigned to the Triple-A Charlotte Knights to begin the year. On August 16, 2021, Wright was selected to the active roster. Wright pitched 18 innings for the White Sox, recording a 5.50 ERA with 11 strikeouts. On October 1, Wright was designated for assignment by Chicago. On October 8, Wright elected free agency.

=== Los Angeles Dodgers ===
On March 14, 2022, Wright signed a minor league contract with the Los Angeles Dodgers. He pitched in 10 games for the Triple–A Oklahoma City Dodgers, with six starts and had a 4.46 ERA when the Dodgers released him on June 1.

=== Chicago White Sox (second stint) ===
On June 5, 2022, Wright signed a minor league contract with the Chicago White Sox and was assigned to the Triple-A Charlotte Knights. In 8 games (7 starts) for Charlotte, he compiled a 4.64 ERA with 14 strikeouts across 21 1/3 innings pitched. Wright elected free agency following the season on November 10.

=== Gastonia Baseball Club ===
On May 28, 2024, Wright signed with the Gastonia Baseball Club of the Atlantic League of Professional Baseball. In 10 starts for Gastonia, he struggled to a 2–4 record and 7.77 ERA with 28 strikeouts across 48 2/3 innings pitched. Wright retired from professional baseball on July 26.

== Pitching style ==
Wright throws 5 pitches: a four seam fastball that averages around 96 MPH, a sinker at around 93, a changeup at around 82, a slider at about 86, and a curveball at around 75.
