= Austin Reiter =

American football player (born 1991)

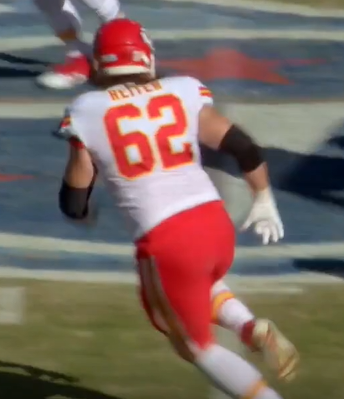
- Reiter with the Kansas City Chiefs in 2019

Profile
- Position: Center

Personal information
- Born: November 27, 1991 (age 34); Arlington, Texas, U.S.
- Listed height: 6 ft 3 in (1.91 m)
- Listed weight: 300 lb (136 kg)

Career information
- High school: Lakewood Ranch (Bradenton, Florida)
- College: South Florida
- NFL draft: 2015: 7th round, 222nd overall pick

Career history
- Washington Redskins (2015–2016)*; Cleveland Browns (2016–2017); Kansas City Chiefs (2018–2020); New Orleans Saints (2021); Miami Dolphins (2021); Los Angeles Rams (2021)*; Kansas City Chiefs (2022–2023)*
- * Offseason or practice squad member only

Awards and highlights
- 3× Super Bowl champion (LIV, LVII, LVIII)

Career NFL statistics
- Games played: 65
- Games started: 38
- Stats at Pro Football Reference

Austin Reiter (born November 27, 1991) is an American professional football center. He was selected by the Washington Redskins in the seventh round of the 2015 NFL draft. He played high school football at Lakewood Ranch High School in Florida and college football at South Florida.

== Professional career ==
Pre-draft measurables
Height	Weight	Arm length	Hand span	40-yard dash	10-yard split	20-yard split	20-yard shuttle	Three-cone drill	Vertical jump	Broad jump
6 ft 2 7/8 in (1.90 m)	300 lb (136 kg)	32 in (0.81 m)	9 1/2 in (0.24 m)	5.17 s	1.71 s	2.83 s	4.53 s	7.65 s	34.0 in (0.86 m)	8 ft 11 in (2.72 m)
All values from Pro Day

=== Washington Redskins ===
With their last pick in the 2015 NFL draft, the Washington Redskins selected Reiter in the seventh round with the 222nd overall pick. He signed a four-year contract with the team on May 8, 2015. He was waived on September 4 before the start of the regular season, but signed to the practice squad on September 29.

He signed a future deal on January 11, 2016. He was released by the Redskins on September 13, 2016. He was re-signed to the teams' practice squad the next day.

=== Cleveland Browns ===
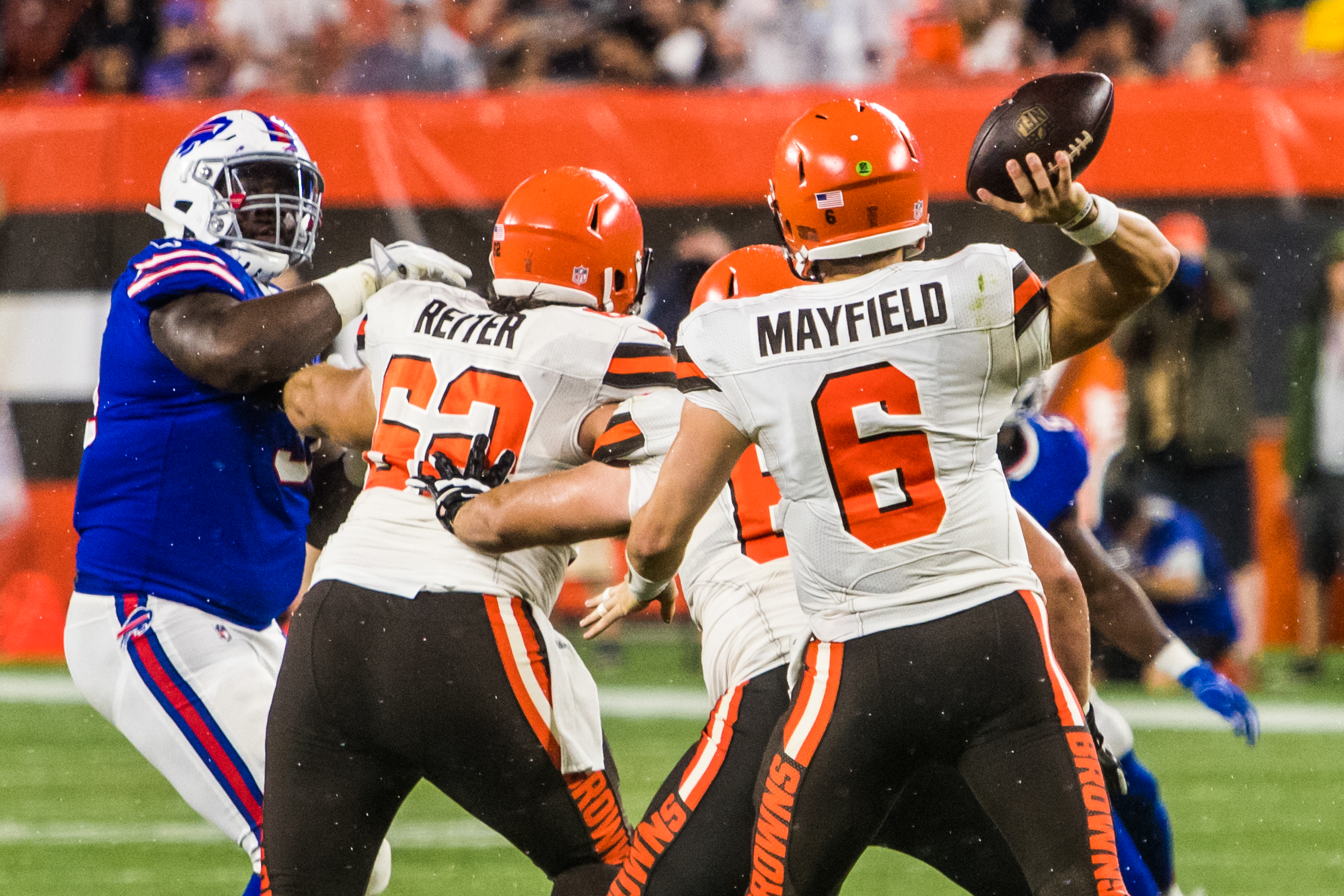
Reiter protecting Baker Mayfield in 2018

On September 20, 2016, Reiter signed with the Cleveland Browns' active roster. On October 2, he started his first game for the Browns but suffered a season-ending ACL tear during the contest. He was placed on injured reserve on October 10, 2016.

Reiter was waived by the Browns on September 2, 2018.

=== Kansas City Chiefs (first stint) ===
On September 3, 2018, Reiter was claimed off waivers by the Kansas City Chiefs. He signed a two-year contract extension with the Chiefs on December 6, 2018.

In 2019, Reiter was named the Chiefs starting center and started every game including the playoffs. He won Super Bowl LIV when the Chiefs defeated the San Francisco 49ers 31–20.

=== New Orleans Saints ===
On September 15, 2021, Reiter was signed to the New Orleans Saints practice squad. On September 18, 2021, Reiter was promoted to the Saints active roster for the game against the Carolina Panthers.

=== Miami Dolphins ===
On October 5, 2021, Reiter was signed by the Miami Dolphins off the Saints' practice squad. He started five games at center due to injury before being released on December 14.

=== Los Angeles Rams ===
On December 18, 2021, Reiter was signed to the Los Angeles Rams practice squad, but was released three days later.

=== Kansas City Chiefs (second stint) ===
Reiter signed with the Chiefs on March 24, 2022. He was released on May 6, but re-signed four days later. He was released on August 30, 2022, and signed to the practice squad the next day. Reiter won his second Super Bowl ring when the Chiefs defeated the Philadelphia Eagles in Super Bowl LVII. He signed a reserve/future contract on February 15, 2023.

On August 29, 2023, Reiter was released by the Chiefs and re-signed to the practice squad. Reiter won his third championship when the Chiefs defeated the 49ers in Super Bowl LVIII.
