= Jason Garcia =

American baseball player (born 1992)

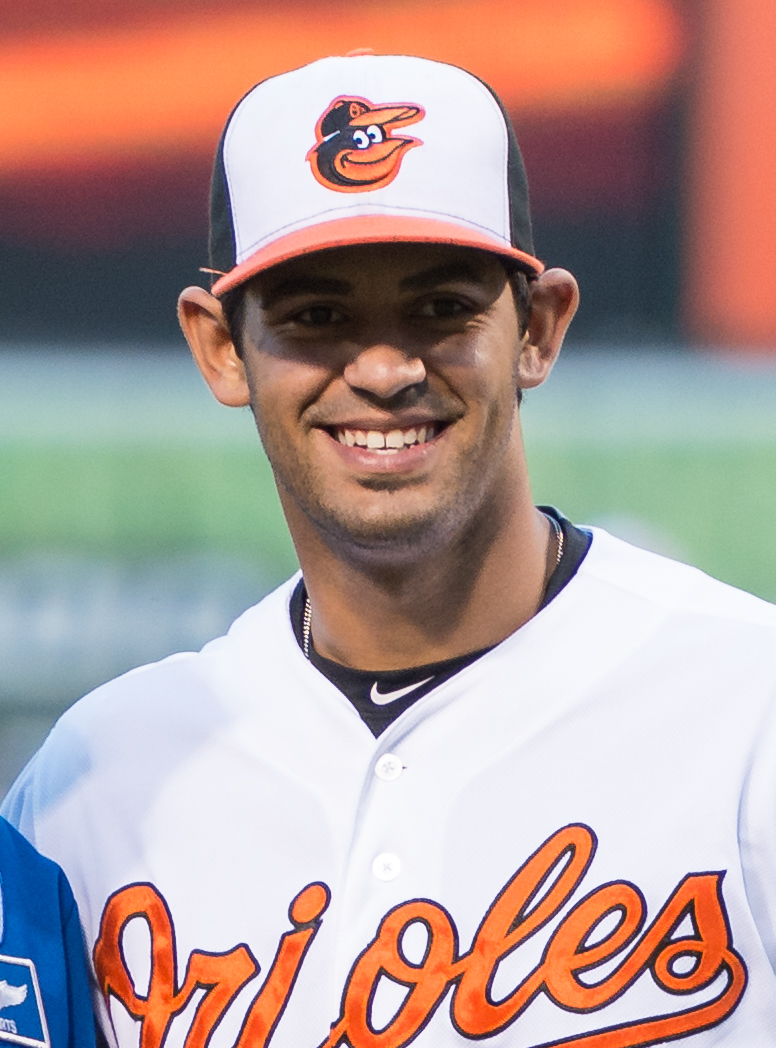
- Garcia with the Baltimore Orioles
- Pitcher
- Born: November 21, 1992 (age 33); Bronx, New York, U.S.
- Batted: Right Threw: Right

MLB debut
- April 8, 2015, for the Baltimore Orioles

Last MLB appearance
- September 30, 2015, for the Baltimore Orioles

MLB statistics
- Win–loss record: 1–0
- Earned run average: 4.25
- Strikeouts: 22
- Stats at Baseball Reference

Teams
- Baltimore Orioles (2015)

Jason Emilio Garcia (born November 21, 1992) is an American former professional baseball pitcher. He played in Major League Baseball (MLB) for the Baltimore Orioles.

== Professional career ==
=== Boston Red Sox ===
Garcia was drafted by the Boston Red Sox in the 17th round of the 2010 Major League Baseball draft out of Land o' Lakes High School in Land o' Lakes, Florida. He made his professional debut with the GCL Red Sox, logging a 1–3 record and 3.03 ERA in 9 games. The next year, he played for the Low-A Lowell Spinners, and pitched to a 3–3 record and 3.88 ERA in 13 games. He played for the Single-A Greenville Drive in 2012, logging a 6–6 record and 6.16 ERA with 95 strikeouts in 115.1 innings of work. He returned to Greenville for the 2013 season, and registered a 2–2 record and 4.21 ERA in 36.1 innings pitched. He split the 2014 season between Greenville and Lowell, accumulating a 3–2 record and 3.67 ERA in 14 appearances between the two teams.

=== Baltimore Orioles ===
He was selected by the Houston Astros in the 2014 Rule 5 Draft and was promptly traded to the Baltimore Orioles. Garcia made the Orioles' Opening Day roster.

On April 8, 2015, Garcia made his major league debut. In one inning of work, he allowed no hits and no runs while walking one against the Tampa Bay Rays. On April 21, 2015, Garcia threw behind Toronto Blue Jays outfielder José Bautista, and later in the at bat, Bautista responded with a home run, Garcia's first allowed of his major league career. While he was rounding the bases, he glared at Garcia, to which Orioles outfielder Adam Jones and infielder Ryan Flaherty responded by yelling at him. On August 16, Garcia was called upon to pitch the eighth and ninth inning against the Oakland Athletics. After the Orioles made a move, removing their DH from the game, Garcia was called upon to hit. He was told not to swing and he drew a four-pitch walk from the A's first baseman Ike Davis. The Orioles won the game 18–2. In his rookie season, Garcia logged a 4.25 ERA with 22 strikeouts in 29.2 innings of work. He spent the entirety of the 2016 season with the Double-A Bowie Baysox, pitching to a 6–10 record and 4.73 ERA in 24 appearances. On April 13, 2017, the Orioles designated Garcia for assignment. He was outrighted to Bowie, where he finished the year, logging a 6–4 record and 5.26 ERA with 74 strikeouts in 75.1 innings pitched. He elected free agency following the season on November 6.

=== Colorado Rockies ===
On March 16, 2018, Garcia signed a minor league contract with the Colorado Rockies organization. He was released by the organization on May 21 after struggling to a 9.64 ERA in 15 appearances for the Double-A Hartford Yard Goats.

=== Sioux City Explorers ===
On August 16, 2018, Garcia signed with the Sioux City Explorers of the independent American Association. In 4 games for Sioux City, Garcia recorded a 3–0 record and 1.57 ERA with 22 strikeouts. In 9 games for Sioux City in 2019, Garcia worked to an 8–1 record and 2.73 ERA in 9 appearances, paired with 51 strikeouts in 56.0 innings pitched.

=== Tampa Bay Rays ===
On July 2, 2019, Garcia's contract was purchased by the Tampa Bay Rays organization. In 10 games for the Double-A Montgomery Biscuits, Garcia pitched to a 7–1 record and 5.07 ERA with 35 strikeouts in 49 2/3 innings of work. He elected free agency following the season on November 4.

=== Southern Maryland Blue Crabs ===
On March 26, 2020, Garcia signed with the Southern Maryland Blue Crabs of the Atlantic League of Professional Baseball. He did not play a game for the team because of the cancellation of the ALPB season due to the COVID-19 pandemic and became a free agent after the year.

=== Minnesota Twins ===
On June 10, 2021, Garcia signed a minor league contract with the Minnesota Twins organization. Upon signing, he assigned to their Double-A affiliate, the Wichita Wind Surge of the Double-A Central. He elected free agency following the season.

=== Guerreros de Oaxaca ===
On February 7, 2022, Garcia signed with the Guerreros de Oaxaca of the Mexican League. In 4 starts, he posted an 0–1 record with a 8.31 ERA. Garcia was released on May 11.

On May 11, 2024, Garcia re–signed with Oaxaca. In 16 appearances, he struggled to an 11.57 ERA, giving up 18 earned runs over 14 innings pitched. Garcia was released by Oaxaca on June 15.

== See also ==
- Rule 5 draft results
