= Dariel Álvarez =

American baseball player (born 1988)

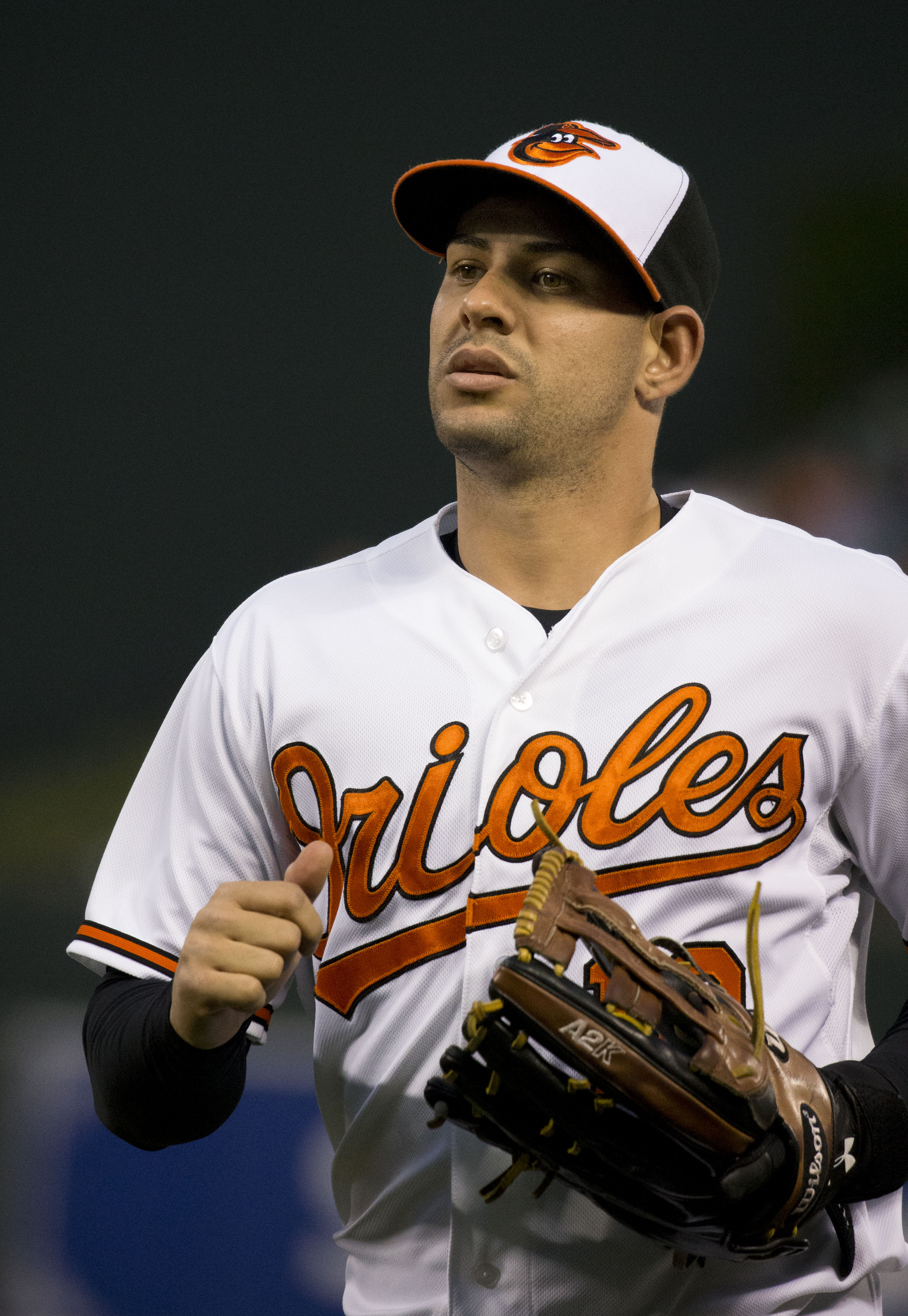
- Álvarez with the Baltimore Orioles
- Right fielder
- Born: November 7, 1988 (age 37); Camagüey, Cuba
- Batted: Right Threw: Right

Professional debut
- MLB: August 28, 2015, for the Baltimore Orioles
- NPB: August 13, 2021, for the Fukuoka SoftBank Hawks

Last appearance
- MLB: July 25, 2016, for the Baltimore Orioles
- NPB: August 31, 2021, for the Fukuoka SoftBank Hawks

MLB statistics
- Batting average: .250
- Home runs: 1
- RBI: 1
- Hits: 8

NPB statistics
- Batting average: .162
- Home runs: 1
- Runs batted in: 3
- Hits: 6
- Stats at Baseball Reference

Teams
- Baltimore Orioles (2015–2016); Fukuoka SoftBank Hawks (2021)

Dariel Álvarez Camejo (born November 7, 1988) is a Cuban former professional baseball right fielder. He has previously played in Major League Baseball (MLB) for the Baltimore Orioles and in Nippon Professional Baseball (NPB) for the Fukuoka SoftBank Hawks.

== Professional career ==
=== Baltimore Orioles ===
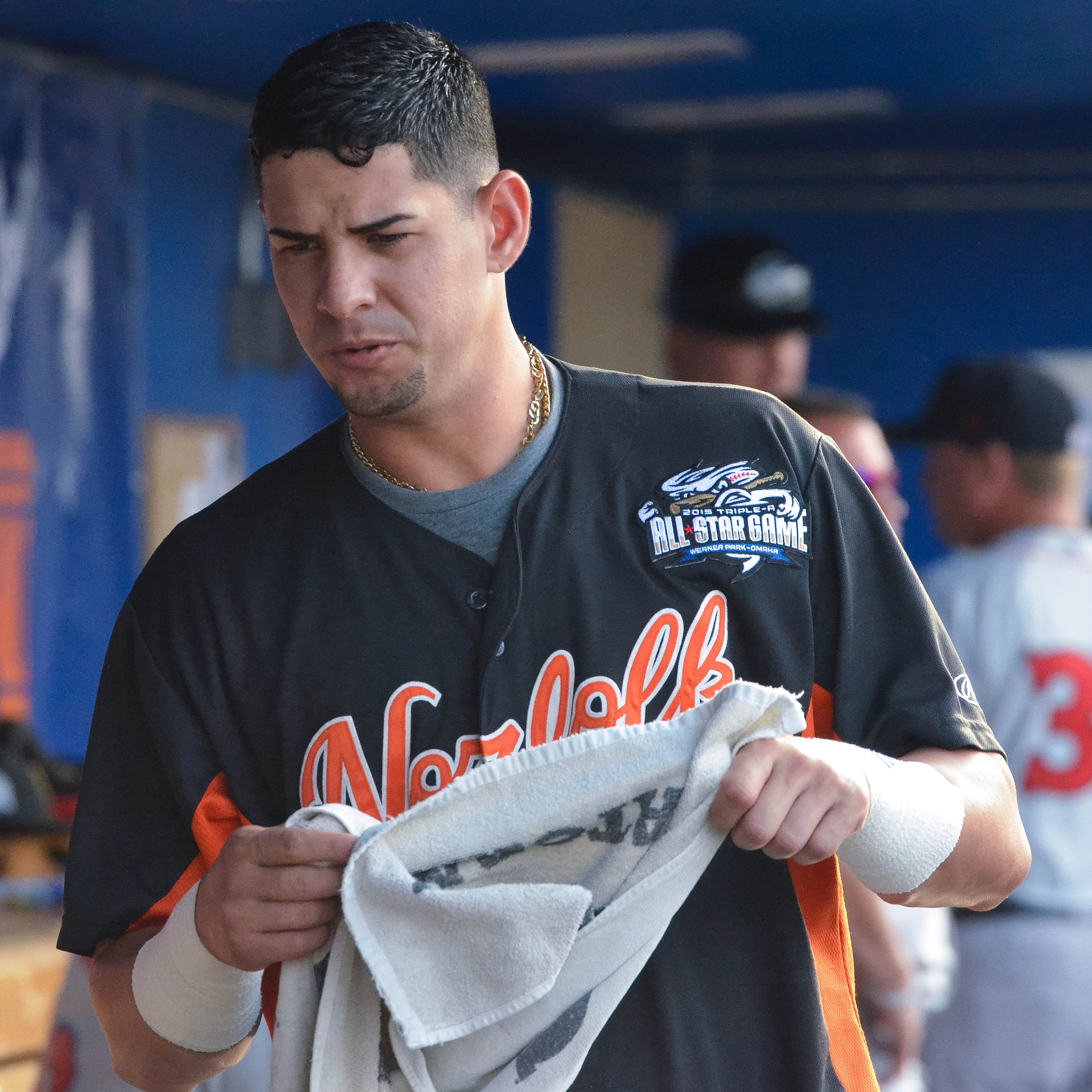
Álvarez with the Norfolk Tides at the 2015 Triple-A All-Star Game

Álvarez played for Camagüey in the Cuban National Series before starting his career in America. On July 24, 2013, Álvarez signed with the Baltimore Orioles organization as an international free agent. He began his professional career with the rookie-level Gulf Coast Orioles, going 4-for-9 with a home run in three games, before he was promoted to the High-A Frederick Keys. After hitting .436/.463/.641 with two home runs in 10 games, he was promoted to the Double-A Bowie Baysox. He finished the year hitting .342/.373/.570 with four home runs in 22 games. Álvarez started the 2014 season back with Bowie, and hit .306/.330/.472 in 135 games between the Baysox and the Triple-A Norfolk Tides. In July 2015, Álvarez played in the All-Star Futures Game. He was assigned to Norfolk to begin the 2015 season, and was named an International League All-Star.

On August 28, 2015, Álvarez was selected to the 40-man roster and promoted to the major leagues for the first time. He made his Major League Baseball debut the same day as the starting right fielder against the Texas Rangers. In the game, Álvarez went 0-for-3 with two strikeouts. On September 11, Alvarez hit his first career Major League home run off of Kansas City Royals starter Danny Duffy. He finished his rookie season 7-for-29 in 12 games with Baltimore.

After competing for a spot on the Orioles' Opening Day roster in 2016, Álvarez was optioned to Triple-A Norfolk to start the 2016 season. The Orioles recalled him to the major leagues on July 4. Álvarez would only appear in 2 games for the Orioles in 2016, spending the majority of the year in Norfolk, and went 1-for-3 with a walk.

Álvarez converted into a pitcher in 2017 and suffered an elbow injury which required Tommy John surgery. He was released by Baltimore on April 6, and re-signed a minor league contract two days later. Álvarez would miss the entire 2017 season due to the injury. He missed the majority of 2018 recovering as well, and pitched in 2 games for the GCL Orioles, recording a 1-1 record and 6.75 ERA with no strikeouts. Álvarez elected free agency on November 2, 2018.

=== Toros de Tijuana ===
On January 14, 2019, Álvarez signed with the Toros de Tijuana of the Mexican League. Álvarez returned to hitting and slashed .264/.282/.389 with 6 home runs and 39 RBI in 49 games with Tijuana.

=== Saraperos de Saltillo ===
On June 4, 2019, Álvarez was traded to the Saraperos de Saltillo of the Mexican League. He finished the year with Saltillo, batting .307/.346/.472 with 12 home runs and 41 RBI in 68 games. Álvarez did not play in a game in 2020 due to the cancellation of the Mexican League season because of the COVID-19 pandemic.

=== Ibaraki Astro Planets ===
On December 19, 2020, Álvarez signed with the Ibaraki Astro Planets of the independent Baseball Challenge League in Japan.

=== Fukuoka SoftBank Hawks ===
On July 21, 2021, Álvarez signed with the Fukuoka SoftBank Hawks of Nippon Professional Baseball (NPB). On August 13, he debuted in the NPB against the Hokkaido Nippon-Ham Fighters, and recorded his first hit on August 22. Álvarez became a free agent following the season.

=== Sultanes de Monterrey ===
On January 18, 2022, Álvarez signed with the Sultanes de Monterrey of the Mexican League for the 2022 season. In 34 games, he batted .186/.226/.339 with 4 home runs and 17 RBIs. Álvarez was released on June 2, 2022.

=== Saraperos de Saltillo (second stint) ===
On June 3, 2022, Álvarez signed with the Saraperos de Saltillo of the Mexican League. Appearing in 52 games for Saltillo, Álvarez slashed .282/.341/.605 with 17 home runs and 53 RBI.

=== Mariachis de Guadalajara ===
On February 13, 2023, Álvarez signed with the Mariachis de Guadalajara of the Mexican League. In 21 games, he batted .308/.353/.462 with one home run and 11 RBI. Álvarez was released on May 16, 2023.
