= Mike Ohlman =

American baseball player (born 1990)

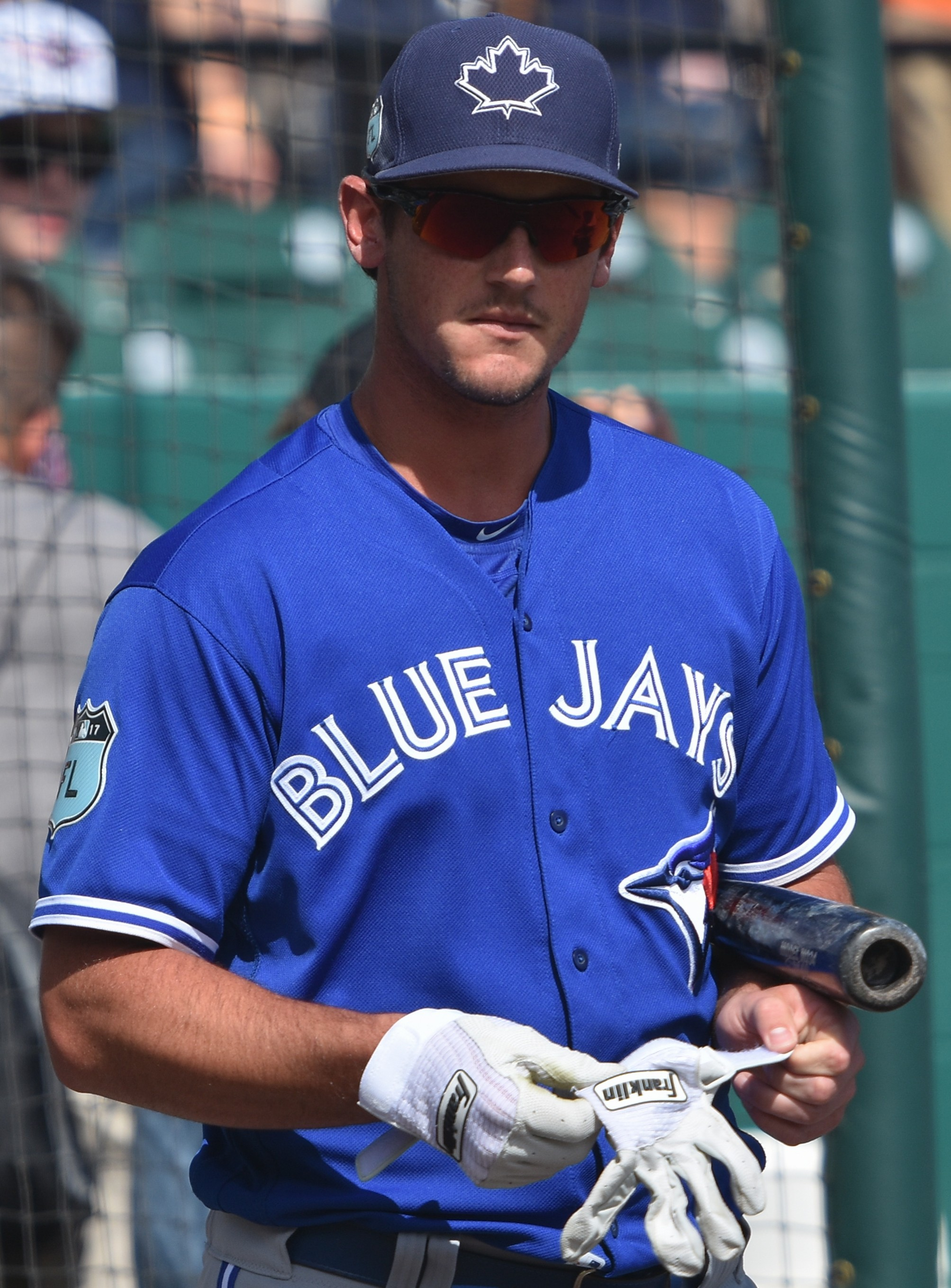
- Ohlman with the Toronto Blue Jays in 2017 spring training
- Catcher
- Born: December 14, 1990 (age 35); Bradenton, Florida, U.S.
- Batted: Right Threw: Right

MLB debut
- May 9, 2017, for the Toronto Blue Jays

Last MLB appearance
- August 15, 2017, for the Toronto Blue Jays

MLB statistics
- Batting average: .231
- Home runs: 0
- Runs batted in: 1
- Stats at Baseball Reference

Teams
- Toronto Blue Jays (2017)

Michael Livingston Ohlman (born December 14, 1990) is an American former professional baseball catcher. He played in Major League Baseball (MLB) for the Toronto Blue Jays during the 2017 season.

== Early years ==
Ohlman attended Lakewood Ranch High School in his hometown of Bradenton, Florida. He played for the Mustangs junior varsity baseball team during his freshman year, and was named to the varsity baseball team in his sophomore season. Ohlman also played soccer.

== Professional career ==
=== Baltimore Orioles ===
Ohlman was selected by the Baltimore Orioles in the 11th round of the 2009 Major League Baseball draft, and signed for a $995,000 bonus. He appeared in four games for the Gulf Coast League Orioles that year, and recorded a .182 batting average and one run batted in (RBI). Ohlman started the 2010 minor league season with the Class-A Delmarva Shorebirds, but was sent down to the Rookie Advanced Bluefield Orioles in June after struggling to compete in A-level baseball. Combined, Ohlman played in 84 games in 2010 and hit .208 with two home runs and 37 RBI. He spent the entire 2011 season with Delmarva, hitting .224 with four home runs and 51 RBI in 105 games. Before the start of the 2012 minor league season, Ohlman was involved in a serious car accident in which the truck he was driving flipped onto its roof. He was placed on the disabled list with a shoulder injury as a result of the crash. While still on the disabled list in April 2012, he was suspended 50 games for testing positive for a second time for a drug of abuse. After serving his suspension, Ohlman was assigned to the Gulf Coast League Orioles for eight games and then moved up to Delmarva to end the season. Ohlman hit .300 in 2012, with three home runs and 31 RBI. In the offseason, he played in 43 games for the Perth Heat of the Australian Baseball League (ABL), batting .317 with six home runs and 27 RBI.

Ohlman continued his progression through the Baltimore minor league system, playing 100 games for the Advanced-A Frederick Keys of the Carolina League. He recorded a .313 batting average, 13 home runs, and 53 RBI. Ohlman appeared in 10 games for the Surprise Saguaros of the Arizona Fall League during the offseason, hitting .290 with four home runs and nine RBI. On November 20, 2013, the Orioles added Ohlman to their 40-man roster, to protect him from the Rule 5 draft. 2014 saw Ohlman make his Double-A debut, appearing in a career-high 113 games for the Bowie Baysox. He batted .236 with two home runs and 33 RBI. Ohlman played in the Arizona Fall League for the second consecutive offseason, appearing in 11 games for the Glendale Desert Dogs. On January 27, 2015, Ohlman was designated for assignment by the Orioles.

=== St. Louis Cardinals ===
Ohlman was traded to the St. Louis Cardinals organization on February 3, 2015 for cash considerations. He was assigned to the Double-A Springfield Cardinals for the entire 2015 season, and batted .274 with 12 home runs and 69 RBI in 103 games. Ohlman also returned to the Arizona Fall League in the offseason, appearing in 11 games for Surprise. In 2016, he appeared in 78 games for the Double-A Cardinals and Triple-A Memphis Redbirds, hitting .287 with seven home runs and 44 RBI. Ohlman elected free agency following the season on November 7, 2016.

=== Toronto Blue Jays ===
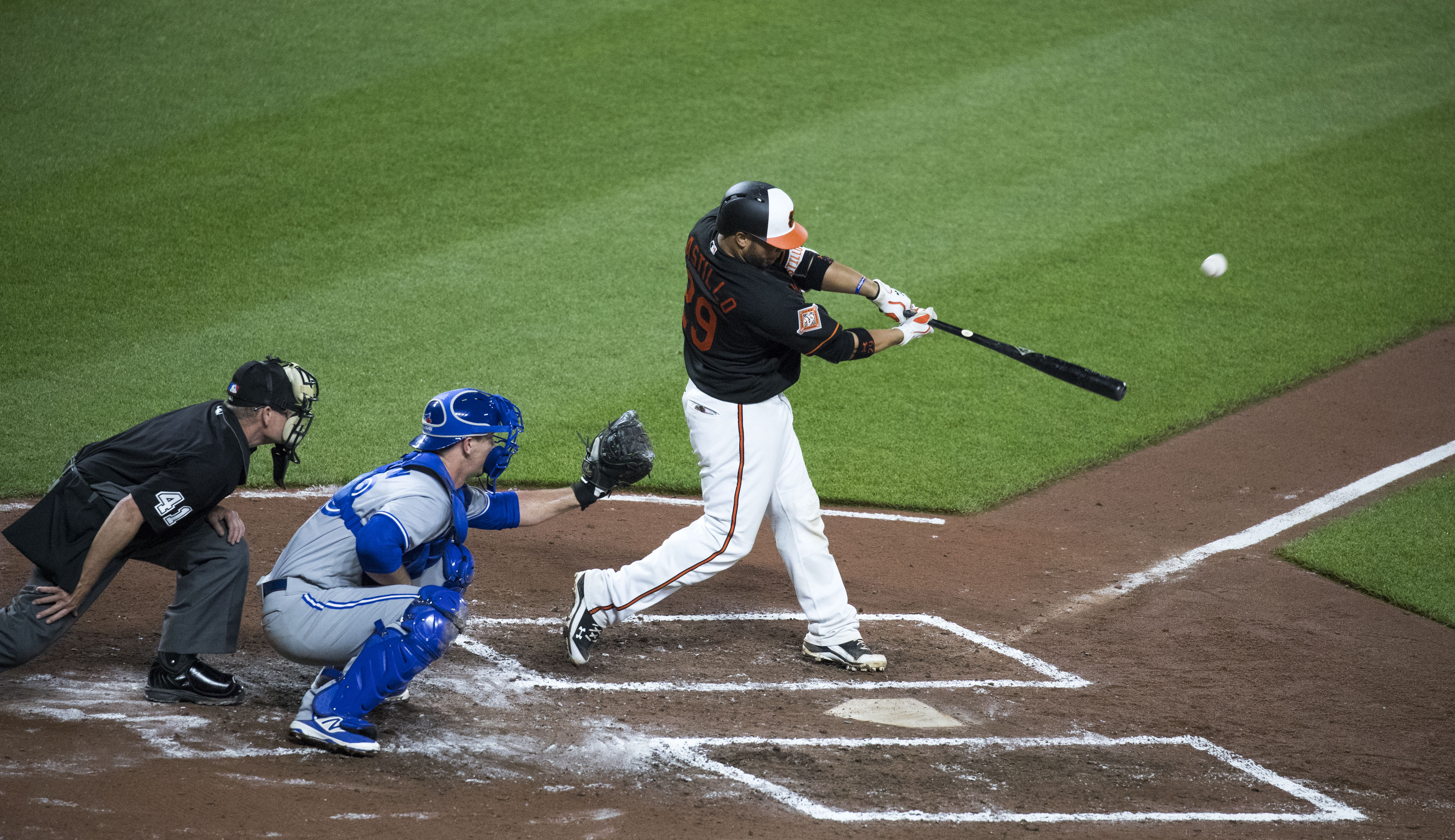
Ohlman catching in the 10th inning of a game against the Baltimore Orioles on May 19, 2017. At bat is Welington Castillo, who hit the game-winning home run on this pitch, with umpire Jerry Meals behind Ohlman.

Ohlman signed a minor league contract that included an invitation to spring training with the Toronto Blue Jays on November 17, 2016. He started the season with the Triple-A Buffalo Bisons. On May 8, the Toronto Blue Jays selected Ohlman's contract after Russell Martin was placed on the disabled list. In his first stint with the club, Ohlman recorded two hits in nine at bats before being designated for assignment on May 20. He cleared waivers on May 23 and accepted an assignment to Triple-A Buffalo. On August 12, Ohlman was called up for the second time in 2017. He platooned with Raffy Lopez while catchers Russell Martin, Luke Maile, and Miguel Montero were on the disabled list. Ohlman was designated for assignment for the second time in 2017 on August 16, and was outrighted to Buffalo on August 19. On October 2, Ohlman elected free agency.

=== Texas Rangers ===
On January 9, 2018, Ohlman signed a minor league contract with the Texas Rangers.

=== Boston Red Sox ===
On March 24, 2018, the Rangers traded Ohlman to the Boston Red Sox for cash considerations. Boston assigned Ohlman to the Triple-A Pawtucket Red Sox. In 69 games for Pawtucket, he batted .208/.312/.360 with 10 home runs and 28 RBI. Ohlman elected free agency following the season on November 2.

=== Somerset Patriots ===
On March 6, 2019, Ohlman signed with the Somerset Patriots of the independent Atlantic League of Professional Baseball. He became a free agent following the season. In 102 games he hit .260/.348/.412 with 10 home runs, 58 RBIs and 2 stolen bases.
