= 2015 Seattle Mariners season =

2015 Seattle Mariners
- League: American League
- Division: West
- Ballpark: Safeco Field
- City: Seattle, Washington
- Record: 76–86 (.469)
- Divisional place: 4th
- Owners: Nintendo of America (represented by Howard Lincoln)
- General managers: Jack Zduriencik, Jeff Kingston (interim), Jerry Dipoto
- Manager: Lloyd McClendon
- Television: Root Sports Northwest (Dave Sims, Mike Blowers, Aaron Goldsmith, Jen Mueller)
- Radio: ESPN-710; Seattle Mariners Radio Network (Rick Rizzs, Aaron Goldsmith, Dave Sims, Alex Rivera, Julio Cruz)

The 2015 Seattle Mariners season was the 39th season in franchise history. The Mariners played their 16th full season (17th overall) at Safeco Field and finished the season with a record of 76–86.

The Mariners signed slugger Nelson Cruz in the offseason and expected to contend. However, the team fell under .500 for good in May. The team fired general manager Jack Zduriencik on August 28. During his seven-year tenure in Seattle, the Mariners had the fifth-worst record in baseball. After Jeff Kingston served as interim general manager, the team hired Jerry Dipoto on September 28. Manager Lloyd McClendon was fired in October.

The Mariners played 23 extra-inning games during the season, the most of any MLB team in 2015.

== Offseason ==
- December 1, 2014: Nelson Cruz signed a four-year, $57 million contract.
- December 3: Traded Michael Saunders to the Toronto Blue Jays for J. A. Happ.
- December 30: Traded Brandon Maurer to the San Diego Padres for Seth Smith.
- January 15, 2015: Received Mike Kickham in a year with the Chicago Cubs for Lars Huijer.
- January 22: Shawn O'Malley signed a minor league contract.
- January 26: Endy Chávez and Franklin Gutiérrez signed minor league contracts.
- February 13: Rickie Weeks Jr. signed a one-year, $2 million contract.
- March 31: Traded Erasmo Ramírez to the Tampa Bay Rays for Mike Montgomery.
- April 2: Joe Beimel signed a minor league contract. The Mariners also acquiredTony Zych from the Cubs for $1.

== Regular season ==
=== Standings ===
==== American League West ====
AL West
Team	W	L	Pct.	GB	Home	Road
Texas Rangers	88	74	.543	—	43‍–‍38	45‍–‍36
Houston Astros	86	76	.531	2	53‍–‍28	33‍–‍48
Los Angeles Angels of Anaheim	85	77	.525	3	49‍–‍32	36‍–‍45
Seattle Mariners	76	86	.469	12	36‍–‍45	40‍–‍41
Oakland Athletics	68	94	.420	20	34‍–‍47	34‍–‍47

==== American League Wild Card ====
Division leaders
Team	W	L	Pct.
Kansas City Royals	95	67	.586
Toronto Blue Jays	93	69	.574
Texas Rangers	88	74	.543

Wild Card teams (Top 2 teams qualify for postseason)
Team	W	L	Pct.	GB
New York Yankees	87	75	.537	+1
Houston Astros	86	76	.531	—
Los Angeles Angels of Anaheim	85	77	.525	1
Minnesota Twins	83	79	.512	3
Cleveland Indians	81	80	.503	4½
Baltimore Orioles	81	81	.500	5
Tampa Bay Rays	80	82	.494	6
Boston Red Sox	78	84	.481	8
Chicago White Sox	76	86	.469	10
Seattle Mariners	76	86	.469	10
Detroit Tigers	74	87	.460	11½
Oakland Athletics	68	94	.420	18

==== Record against opponents ====
2015 American League record Source: MLB Standings Grid – 2015
Team	BAL	BOS	CWS	CLE	DET	HOU	KC	LAA	MIN	NYY	OAK	SEA	TB	TEX	TOR	NL
Baltimore	—	11–8	3–3	5–1	4–3	3–4	3–4	2–4	0–7	10–9	6–1	3–3	10–9	1–6	8–11	12–8
Boston	8–11	—	3–4	2–4	4–2	2–4	4–3	2–5	2–5	8–11	5–1	4–3	9–10	2–5	10–9	13–7
Chicago	3–3	4–3	—	10–9	9–10	5–1	7–12	4–3	6–13	2–5	5–2	4–3	1–5	3–3	4–3	9–11
Cleveland	1–5	4–2	9–10	—	7–11	5–2	9–10	4–2	7–12	5–2	3–4	4–3	5–2	3–3	3–4	12–8
Detroit	3–4	2–4	10–9	11–7	—	3–4	9–10	1–6	11–8	2–5	2–4	4–3	3–3	2–5	2–4	9–11
Houston	4–3	4–2	1–5	2–5	4–3	—	4–2	10–9	3–3	4–3	10–9	12–7	2–5	6–13	4–3	16–4
Kansas City	4–3	3–4	12–7	10–9	10–9	2–4	—	6–1	12–7	2–4	5–1	4–2	6–1	3–4	3–4	13–7
Los Angeles	4–2	5–2	3–4	2–4	6–1	9–10	1–6	—	5–2	2–4	11–8	12–7	3–3	12–7	2–5	8–12
Minnesota	7–0	5–2	13–6	12–7	8–11	3–3	7–12	2–5	—	1–5	4–3	4–3	4–2	3–3	2–5	8–12
New York	9–10	11–8	5–2	2–5	5–2	3–4	4–2	4–2	5–1	—	3–4	5–1	12–7	2–5	6–13	11–9
Oakland	1–6	1–5	2–5	4–3	4–2	9–10	1–5	8–11	3–4	4–3	—	6–13	3–4	10–9	1–5	11–9
Seattle	3–3	3–4	3–4	3–4	3–4	7–12	2–4	7–12	3–4	1–5	13–6	—	4–3	12–7	4–2	8–12
Tampa Bay	9–10	10–9	5–1	2–5	3–3	5–2	1–6	3–3	2–4	7–12	4–3	3–4	—	2–5	10–9	14–6
Texas	6–1	5–2	3–3	3–3	5–2	13–6	4–3	7–12	3–3	5–2	9–10	7–12	5–2	—	2–4	11–9
Toronto	11–8	9–10	3–4	4–3	4–2	3–4	4–3	5–2	5–2	13–6	5–1	2–4	9–10	4–2	—	12–8

=== Season summary ===
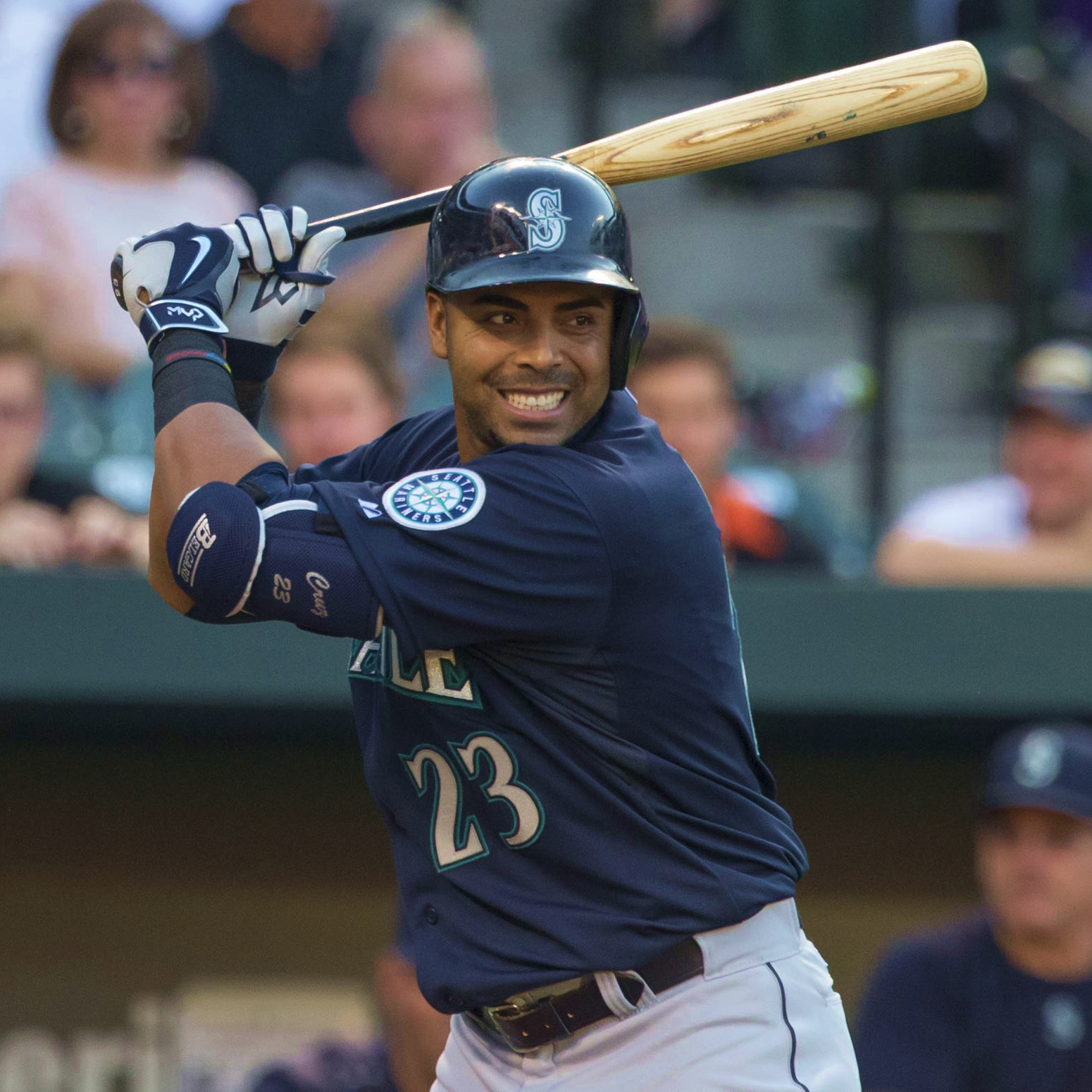
Nelson Cruz was an All-Star and Silver Slugger in 2015

On April 19, newly signed Nelson Cruz hit a walk-off single and two home runs against his former team, the Texas Rangers, as part of a five-run comeback. Cruz was named the American League (AL) Player of the Month in April. On May 27, Cruz hit a three-run home run into the stingray tank at Tropicana Field to sweep the Tampa Bay Rays and move the Mariners up to .500.

Rookie starting pitcher Mike Montgomery threw consecutive shutouts in June, besting the Kansas City Royals and San Diego Padres.

Cruz and Félix Hernández were named to the MLB All-Star Game.

The Mariners turned a triple play against the Toronto Blue Jays on July 26. Hisashi Iwakuma threw a no-hitter on August 12 against the Baltimore Orioles.

On August 28, general manager (GM) Jack Zduriencik was fired. Jeff Kingston was named interim GM, with Jerry Dipoto hired for the role a month later. Dipoto fired manager Lloyd McClendon after the season.

Cruz won his first Silver Slugger Award.

=== Game log ===
2015 Game Log (76–86)
April: 10–12 (Home: 5–7; Away: 5–5)

#	Date	Opponent	Score	Win	Loss	Save	Attendance	Record
1	April 6	Angels	4–1	**Hernández** (1–0)	Weaver (0–1)	**Rodney** (1)	45,909	1–0
2	April 7	Angels	0–2	Wilson (1–0)	**Paxton** (0–1)	Street (1)	26,545	1–1
3	April 8	Angels	3–5	Shoemaker (1–0)	**Iwakuma** (0–1)	Street (2)	25,495	1–2
4	April 10	@ Athletics	0–12	Pomeranz (1–0)	**Walker** (0–1)	—	30,114	1–3
5	April 11	@ Athletics	5–4 (11)	**Olson** (1–0)	Abad (0–1)	**Rodney** (2)	24,355	2–3
6	April 12	@ Athletics	8–7 (10)	**Rodney** (1–0)	Clippard (0–1)	**Medina** (1)	32,282	3–3
7	April 13	@ Dodgers	5–6 (10)	Garcia (1–0)	**Leone** (0–1)	—	42,202	3–4
8	April 14	@ Dodgers	5–6	Garcia (2–0)	**Rodney** (1–1)	—	43,115	3–5
9	April 15	@ Dodgers	2–5	Anderson (1–0)	**Walker** (0–2)	—	51,287	3–6
10	April 17	Rangers	1–3	Gallardo (2–1)	**Happ** (0–1)	Feliz (2)	36,606	3–7
11	April 18	Rangers	3–1	**Hernández** (2–0)	Lewis (1–1)	**Rodney** (3)	43,017	4–7
12	April 19	Rangers	11–10	**Medina** (1–0)	Feliz (0–1)	—	31,601	5–7
13	April 20	Astros	5–7	Sipp (1–0)	**Farquhar** (0–1)	Gregerson (3)	15,129	5–8
14	April 21	Astros	3–6	McHugh (3–0)	**Furbush** (0–1)	Qualls (1)	13,949	5–9
15	April 22	Astros	3–2	**Happ** (1–1)	Hernández (0–2)	**Rodney** (4)	14,756	6–9
16	April 24	Twins	2–0	**Hernández** (3–0)	Hughes (0–4)	—	25,215	7–9
17	April 25	Twins	5–8	Stauffer (1–0)	**Paxton** (0–2)	Perkins (4)	33,566	7–10
18	April 26	Twins	2–4 (11)	Fien (1–1)	**Olson** (1–1)	Perkins (5)	35,242	7–11
19	April 27	@ Rangers	3–1	**Walker** (1–2)	Gallardo (2–3)	**Rodney** (5)	19,748	8–11
20	April 28	@ Rangers	2–1	**Happ** (2–1)	Detwiler (0–3)	**Rodney** (6)	23,714	9–11
21	April 29	@ Rangers	5–2	**Hernández** (4–0)	Rodríguez (0–1)	**Rodney** (7)	26,037	10–11
22	April 30	@ Astros	2–3 (10)	Gregerson (2–0)	**Leone** (0–2)	—	19,108	10–12

May: 14–14 (Home: 7–6; Away: 7–8)

#	Date	Opponent	Score	Win	Loss	Save	Attendance	Record
23	May 1	@ Astros	3–4	Fields (1–0)	**Elias** (0–1)	Gregerson (5)	21,834	10–13
24	May 2	@ Astros	4–11	McHugh (4–0)	**Walker** (1–3)	—	24,435	10–14
25	May 3	@ Astros	6–7	Neshek (2–0)	**Smith** (0–1)	Gregerson (6)	25,283	10–15
26	May 4	@ Angels	3–2	**Hernández** (5–0)	Shoemaker (2–2)	**Rodney** (8)	25,024	11–15
27	May 5	@ Angels	4–5	Street (1–0)	**Leone** (0–3)	—	33,394	11–16
28	May 6	@ Angels	3–4	Street (2–0)	**Smith** (0–2)	—	25,160	11–17
29	May 8	Athletics	4–3 (11)	**Smith** (1–2)	Otero (2–2)	—	25,187	12–17
30	May 9	Athletics	7–2	**Happ** (3–1)	Hahn (1–3)	—	37,441	13–17
31	May 10	Athletics	4–3	**Hernández** (6–0)	Chavez (1–3)	**Rodney** (9)	42,831	14–17
32	May 12	Padres	11–4	**Paxton** (1–2)	Kennedy (2–2)	—	16,148	15–17
33	May 13	Padres	2–4	Shields (5–0)	**Walker** (1–4)	Kimbrel (10)	14,547	15–18
34	May 14	Red Sox	1–2	Barnes (2–0)	**Rodney** (1–2)	Uehara (8)	20,172	15–19
35	May 15	Red Sox	2–1	**Wilhelmsen** (1–0)	Layne (0–1)	—	39,477	16–19
36	May 16	Red Sox	2–4	Porcello (4–2)	**Hernández** (6–1)	Uehara (9)	45,055	16–20
37	May 17	Red Sox	5–0	**Paxton** (2–2)	Wright (1–1)	—	39.936	17–20
38	May 19	@ Orioles	4–9	González (5–2)	**Farquhar** (0–2)	—	19,494	17–21
39	May 20	@ Orioles	4–2	**Elias** (1–1)	Chen (1–3)	**Rodney** (10)	21,710	18–21
40	May 21	@ Orioles	4–5	Hunter (2–1)	**Farquhar** (0–3)	Britton (9)	33,085	18–22
41	May 22	@ Blue Jays	4–3	**Hernández** (7–1)	Estrada (1–3)	**Rodney** (11)	21,195	19–22
42	May 23	@ Blue Jays	3–2	**Paxton** (3–2)	Buehrle (5–4)	**Rodney** (12)	33,086	20–22
43	May 24	@ Blue Jays	2–8	Sanchez (4–4)	**Walker** (1–5)	—	37,929	20–23
44	May 25	@ Rays	4–1	**Elias** (2–1)	Odorizzi (3–5)	**Rodney** (13)	10,401	21–23
45	May 26	@ Rays	7–6 (10)	**Rodney** (2–2)	Boxberger (2–2)	**Beimel** (1)	9,628	22–23
46	May 27	@ Rays	3–0	**Hernández** (8–1)	Boxberger (2–3)	—	10,365	23–23
47	May 28	Indians	3–5	Kluber (3–5)	**Paxton** (3–3)	Allen (10)	19,449	23–24
48	May 29	Indians	2–1	**Walker** (2–5)	Bauer (4–2)	**Rodney** (14)	32,454	24–24
49	May 30	Indians	3–4	Marcum (2–0)	**Elias** (2–2)	Allen (11)	32,287	24–25
50	May 31	Indians	3–6 (12)	McAllister (1-2)	**Leone** (0-4)	Adams (1)	32,112	24–26

June: 11–16 (Home: 5–10; Away: 6–6)

#	Date	Opponent	Score	Win	Loss	Save	Attendance	Record
51	June 1	Yankees	2–7	Pineda (7–2)	**Hernández** (8–2)	—	26,082	24–27
52	June 2	Yankees	3–5 (11)	Wilson (2–0)	**Wilhelmsen** (1–1)	Miller (16)	27,442	24–28
53	June 3	Yankees	1–3	Tanaka (3–1)	**Walker** (2–6)	Miller (17)	32,701	24–29
54	June 4	Rays	1–2	Ramírez (4–2)	**Elías** (2–3)	Jepsen (2)	16,096	24–30
55	June 5	Rays	0–1	Bellatti (2–0)	**Rodney** (2–3)	Jepsen (3)	20,695	24–31
56	June 6	Rays	2–1	**Hernández** (9–2)	Geltz (1–2)	**Smith** (1)	31,106	25–31
57	June 7	Rays	1–3	Archer (7–4)	**Montgomery** (0–1)	Jepsen (4)	27,906	25–32
58	June 9	@ Indians	3–2	**Elias** (3–3)	Kluber (3–7)	**Smith** (2)	11,425	26–32
59	June 10	@ Indians	9–3	**Walker** (3–6)	Bauer (5–3)	—	12,305	27–32
60	June 11	@ Indians	0–6	Marcum (3–1)	**Happ** (3–2)	—	15,316	27–33
61	June 12	@ Astros	0–10	Oberholtzer (1–1)	**Hernández** (9–3)	—	32,173	27–34
62	June 13	@ Astros	8–1	**Montgomery** (1–1)	McHugh (6–3)	—	36,762	28–34
63	June 14	@ Astros	0–13	McCullers (3–1)	**Elias** (3–4)	—	29,153	28–35
64	June 15	@ Giants	5–1	**Walker** (4–6)	Hudson (4–6)	—	42,099	29–35
65	June 16	@ Giants	2–6	Lincecum (7–3)	**Happ** (3–3)	—	41,267	29–36
66	June 17	Giants	2–0	**Hernández** (10–3)	Bumgarner (7–4)	**Smith** (3)	34,844	30–36
67	June 18	Giants	0–7	Vogelsong (5–5)	**Montgomery** (1–2)	—	34,354	30–37
68	June 19	Astros	5–2	**Elias** (4–4)	McCullers (3–2)	**Smith** (4)	40,914	31–37
69	June 20	Astros	6–3	**Walker** (5–6)	Keuchel (8–3)	**Smith** (5)	26,770	32–37
70	June 21	Astros	2–6	Harris (4–0)	**Happ** (3–4)	—	40,905	32–38
71	June 22	Royals	1–4	Blanton (2–0)	**Hernández** (10–4)	Holland (14)	23,588	32–39
72	June 23	Royals	7–0	**Montgomery** (2–2)	Guthrie (5–5)	—	17,460	33–39
73	June 24	Royals	2–8	Madson (1–1)	**Elias** (4–5)	—	23,392	33–40
74	June 26	@ Angels	3–1	**Walker** (6–6)	Shoemaker (4–6)	**Rodney** (15)	41,137	34–40
75	June 27	@ Angels	2–4	Richards (8–5)	**Happ** (3–5)	Street (21)	40,514	34–41
76	June 28	@ Angels	2–3 (10)	Gott (1–0)	**Wilhelmsen** (1–2)	—	38,387	34–42
77	June 30	@ Padres	5–0	**Montgomery** (3–2)	Kennedy (4–7)	—	30,368	35–42

July: 12–15 (Home: 5–8; Away: 7–7)

#	Date	Opponent	Score	Win	Loss	Save	Attendance	Record
78	July 1	@ Padres	7–0	**Walker** (7–6)	Shields (7–3)	—	30,251	36–42
79	July 2	@ Athletics	0–4	Kazmir (5–5)	**Elias** (4–6)	—	13,062	36–43
80	July 3	@ Athletics	9–5	**Happ** (4–5)	Chavez (4–8)	—	35,067	37–43
81	July 4	@ Athletics	0–2	Graveman (6–4)	**Hernández** (10–5)	Clippard (15)	18,915	37–44
82	July 5	@ Athletics	2–1	**Montgomery** (4–2)	Bassitt (0–2)	**Rodney** (16)	22,163	38–44
83	July 6	Tigers	5–12	Simón (8–5)	**Guaipe** (0–1)	—	22,580	38–45
84	July 7	Tigers	7–6 (11)	**Furbush** (1–1)	Krol (1–2)	—	21,782	39–45
85	July 8	Tigers	4–5	Sánchez (8–7)	**Guaipe** (0–2)	Soria (19)	26,488	39–46
86	July 9	Angels	7–2	**Hernández** (11–5)	Richards (9–6)	**Smith** (6)	28,131	40–46
87	July 10	Angels	3–7	Santiago (6–4)	**Montgomery** (4–3)	—	29,679	40–47
88	July 11	Angels	5–0	**Iwakuma** (1–1)	Wilson (7–7)	—	40,765	41–47
89	July 12	Angels	3–10	Heaney (3–0)	**Walker** (7–7)	—	36,955	41–48
–	July 14	86th All-Star Game	National League vs. American League (Great American Ball Park, Cincinnati)					
90	July 17	@ Yankees	3–4	Tanaka (6–3)	**Beimel** (0–1)	Miller (19)	47,086	41–49
91	July 18	@ Yankees	4–3	**Iwakuma** (2–1)	Pineda (9–6)	**Smith** (7)	46,119	42–49
92	July 19	@ Yankees	1–2	Betances (6–2)	**Rodney** (2–4)	Miller (20)	42,926	42–50
93	July 20	@ Tigers	4–5	Alburquerque (1–0)	**Lowe** (0–1)	Soria (21)	34,353	42–51
94	July 21	@ Tigers	11–9	**Beimel** (1–1)	Feliz (1–3)	**Smith** (8)	34,088	43–51
95	July 22	@ Tigers	4–9	Sánchez (10–7)	**Montgomery** (4–4)	Soria (22)	36,670	43–52
96	July 23	@ Tigers	3–2 (12)	**Rodney** (3–4)	Krol (1–3)	**Wilhelmsen** (1)	40,225	44–52
97	July 24	Blue Jays	5–2	**Hernández** (12–5)	Estrada (7–6)	**Smith** (9)	43,328	45–52
98	July 25	Blue Jays	6–8	Sanchez (6–4)	**Smith** (1–3)	Osuna (5)	45,027	45–53
99	July 26	Blue Jays	6–5 (10)	**Beimel** (2–1)	Loup (2–5)	—	35,159	46–53
100	July 27	D-backs	3–4 (10)	Pérez (2–1)	**Smith** (1–4)	Chafin (2)	19,532	46–54
101	July 28	D-backs	4–8	Godley (2–0)	**Iwakuma** (2–2)	—	25,106	46–55
102	July 29	D-backs	2–8	Corbin (2–3)	**Hernández** (12–6)	—	32,502	46–56
103	July 30	@ Twins	5–9	Hughes (10–6)	**Happ** (4–6)	—	30,534	46–57
104	July 31	@ Twins	6–1	**Walker** (8–7)	Milone (5–3)	—	27,643	47–57

August: 14–14 (Home: 7–5; Away: 7–9)

#	Date	Opponent	Score	Win	Loss	Save	Attendance	Record
105	August 1	@ Twins	2–3	May (7–7)	**Smith** (1–5)	—	36,901	47–58
106	August 2	@ Twins	4–1 (11)	**Rodney** (4–4)	Jepsen (2–6)	**Wilhelmsen** (2)	30,325	48–58
107	August 3	@ Rockies	8–7	**Hernández** (13–6)	Butler (3–8)	**Smith** (10)	33,107	49–58
108	August 4	@ Rockies	10–4	**Rasmussen** (1–0)	Friedrich (0–3)	—	34,376	50–58
109	August 5	@ Rockies	5–7 (11)	Flande (2–1)	**Guaipe** (0–3)	—	30,196	50–59
110	August 7	Rangers	4–3	**Iwakuma** (3–2)	Hamels (6–8)	**Smith** (11)	29,320	51–59
111	August 8	Rangers	3–11 (11)	Tolleson (4–2)	**Rasmussen** (1–1)	—	39,132	51–60
112	August 9	Rangers	4–2	**Hernández** (14–6)	Lewis (12–5)	**Smith** (12)	29,939	52–60
113	August 10	Orioles	2–3	Chen (6–6)	**Nuño** (0–2)	Britton (28)	20,839	52–61
114	August 11	Orioles	6–5 (10)	**Rodney** (5–4)	McFarland (0–2)	—	24,863	53–61
115	August 12	Orioles	3–0	**Iwakuma** (4–2)	Gausman (2–4)	—	25,661	54–61
116	August 14	@ Red Sox	1–15	Kelly (5–6)	**Montgomery** (4–5)	—	37,678	54–62
117	August 15	@ Red Sox	10–22	Miley (9–9)	**Hernández** (14–7)	—	36,027	54–63
118	August 16	@ Red Sox	10–8 (12)	**Rasmussen** (2–1)	Breslow (0–3)	**Farquhar** (1)	35,260	55–63
119	August 17	@ Rangers	3–4	Tolleson (5–2)	**Rodney** (5–5)	—	19,880	55–64
120	August 18	@ Rangers	3–2	**Iwakuma** (5–2)	Gonzalez (2–5)	**Smith** (13)	26,870	56–64
121	August 19	@ Rangers	2–7	Holland (1–1)	**Montgomery** (4–6)	—	20,142	56–65
122	August 21	White Sox	4–11	Sale (12–7)	**Hernández** (14–8)	—	35,770	56–66
123	August 22	White Sox	3–6 (10)	Jones (1–0)	**Farquhar** (0–4)	Robertson (25)	32,085	56–67
124	August 23	White Sox	8–6	**Walker** (9–7)	Danks (6–11)	**Wilhelmsen** (3)	30,537	57–67
125	August 24	Athletics	5–11	Mujica (3–4)	**Iwakuma** (5–3)	—	17,970	57–68
126	August 25	Athletics	6–5	**Olmos** (1–0)	Chavez (7–13)	**Wilhelmsen** (4)	17,498	58–68
127	August 26	Athletics	8–2	**Hernández** (15–8)	Bassitt (1–6)	—	23,338	59–68
128	August 27	@ White Sox	2–4	Rodon (6–5)	**Elias** (4–7)	Robertson (27)	15,076	59–69
129	August 28	@ White Sox	2–0	**Walker** (10–7)	Danks (6–12)	**Wilhelmsen** (5)	27,870	60–69
130	August 29	@ White Sox	7–6	**Iwakuma** (6–3)	Samardzija (8–11)	**Wilhelmsen** (6)	26,011	61–69
131	August 30	@ White Sox	5–6 (11)	Robertson (6–3)	**Rollins** (0–1)	—	28,031	61–70
132	August 31	@ Astros	3–8	Keuchel (16–6)	**Nuño** (0–3)	—	19,923	61–71

September: 14–13 (Home: 6–7; Away: 8–6)

#	Date	Opponent	Score	Win	Loss	Save	Attendance	Record
133	September 1	@ Astros	7–5	**Kensing** (1–0)	Neshek (3–4)	**Wilhelmsen** (7)	18,157	62–71
134	September 2	@ Astros	8–3	**Smith** (2–5)	Neshek (3–5)	**Wilhelmsen** (8)	18,669	63–71
135	September 4	@ Athletics	11–8	**Ramírez** (1–0)	Brooks (1–2)	**Wilhelmsen** (9)	16,382	64–71
136	September 5	@ Athletics	8–3	**Hernández** (16–8)	Chavez (7–14)	—	27,387	65–71
137	September 6	@ Athletics	3–2	**Iwakuma** (7–3)	Nolin (0–1)	**Wilhelmsen** (10)	19,534	66–71
138	September 7	Rangers	0–3	Gallardo (12–9)	**Elias** (4–8)	Tolleson (30)	18,469	66–72
139	September 8	Rangers	6–9	Hamels (9–8)	**Walker** (10–8)	Tolleson (31)	13,389	66–73
140	September 9	Rangers	6–0	**Nuño** (1–3)	Perez (2–5)	—	14,330	67–73
141	September 10	Rangers	5–0	**Hernández** (17–8)	Holland (3–2)	—	16,842	68–73
142	September 11	Rockies	2–4	Bettis (7–5)	**Iwakuma** (7–4)	Axford (22)	19,876	68–74
143	September 12	Rockies	7–2	**Elias** (5–8)	Flande (3–3)	—	24,743	69–74
144	September 13	Rockies	2–3	Kendrick (6–12)	**Paxton** (3–4)	Axford (23)	21,840	69–75
145	September 14	Angels	10–1	**Walker** (11–8)	Richards (13–11)	—	13,681	70–75
146	September 15	Angels	3–4	Tropeano (2–2)	**Hernández** (17–9)	Smith (3)	15,365	70–76
147	September 16	Angels	3–1	**Iwakuma** (8–4)	Weaver (7–11)	**Wilhelmsen** (11)	16,176	71–76
148	September 18	@ Rangers	3–1	**Farquhar** (1–4)	Gallardo (12–11)	**Wilhelmsen** (12)	26,727	72–76
149	September 19	@ Rangers	1–10	Hamels (10–8)	**Nuño** (1–4)	—	39,843	72–77
150	September 20	@ Rangers	9–2	**Hernández** (18–9)	Holland (3–3)	—	33,307	73–77
151	September 22	@ Royals	11–2	**Iwakuma** (9–4)	Guthrie (8–8)	—	29,081	74–77
152	September 23	@ Royals	3–4 (10)	Davis (8–1)	**Rollins** (0–2)	—	28,756	74–78
153	September 24	@ Royals	4–10	Cueto (10–12)	**Kensing** (1–1)	—	32,244	74–79
154	September 25	@ Angels	4–8	Richards (15–11)	**Nuño** (1–5)	—	38,355	74–80
155	September 26	@ Angels	2–3	Salas (4–2)	**Farquhar** (1–5)	—	37,866	74–81
156	September 27	@ Angels	2–3	Salas (5–2)	**Iwakuma** (9–5)	Morin (1)	35,243	74–82
157	September 28	Astros	2–3	McCullers (6–7)	**Farquhar** (1–6)	Gregerson (30)	13,935	74–83
158	September 29	Astros	6–4	**Wilhelmsen** (2–2)	Pérez (2–4)	—	15,331	75–83
159	September 30	Astros	6–7	Sipp (3–4)	**Farquhar** (1–7)	Gregerson (31)	14,257	75–84

October: 1–2 (Home: 1–2; Away: 0–0)

#	Date	Opponent	Score	Win	Loss	Save	Attendance	Record
160	October 2	Athletics	2–4	Brooks (3–4)	**Farquhar** (1–8)	Doolittle (4)	26,130	75–85
161	October 3	Athletics	5–7 (13)	Venditte (2–2)	**Ramirez** (1–2)	Doubront (1)	24,448	75–86
162	October 4	Athletics	3–2	**Kensing** (2–1)	Dull (1–2)	**Wilhelmsen** (13)	22,402	76–86

Legend: = Win = Loss = Postponement
Bold = Mariners team member

== 2015 roster ==
2015 Seattle Mariners
Roster
Pitchers: 97 Joe Beimel; 29 Roenis Elías; 40 Danny Farquhar; 41 Charlie Furbush; 53 Mayckol Guaipe; 33 J. A. Happ; 34 Félix Hernández; 18 Hisashi Iwakuma; 27 Logan Kensing; 52 Dominic Leone; 57 Mark Lowe; 44 Lucas Luetge; 31 Yoervis Medina; 37 Mike Montgomery; 38 Vidal Nuño; 49 Edgar Olmos; 66 Tyler Olson; 65 James Paxton; 56 J. C. Ramírez; 31 José Ramírez; 50 Rob Rasmussen; 56 Fernando Rodney; 73,59 David Rollins; 39 Carson Smith; 32 Taijuan Walker; 54 Tom Wilhelmsen; 55 Tony Zych	Catchers: 10 Steve Baron; 35 Welington Castillo; 6 John Hicks; 2 Jesús Sucre; 3 Mike Zunino; Infielders: 8 Willie Bloomquist; 22 Robinson Canó; 4 Ketel Marte; 5 Brad Miller; 63 Jesús Montero; 20 Logan Morrison; 15 Kyle Seager; 1 Chris Taylor; 35 Mark Trumbo; 25 Rickie Weeks	Outfielders: 13 Dustin Ackley; 23 Nelson Cruz; 30 Franklin Gutiérrez; 16 Austin Jackson; 99 James Jones; 36 Shawn O'Malley; 17 Stefen Romero; 12 Justin Ruggiano; 7 Seth Smith	Manager: 23 Lloyd McClendon; Coaches: 26 Rich Donnelly (third base); 45 Trent Jewett (bench); 11 Edgar Martínez (hitting); 62 Jason Phillips (bullpen catcher); 88 Chris Prieto (quality control); 48 Mike Rojas (bullpen); 43 Andy Van Slyke (assistant hitting coach); 47 Rick Waits (pitching); 28 Chris Woodward (first base)

=== Statistics ===
Through October 4, 2015

==== Batting ====
Note: G = Games played; AB = At bats; R = Runs scored; H = Hits; 2B = Doubles; 3B = Triples; HR = Home runs; RBI = Runs batted in; BB = Base on balls; SO = Strikeouts; AVG = Batting average; SB = Stolen bases

Player	G	AB	R	H	2B	3B	HR	RBI	BB	SO	AVG	SB
Dustin Ackley, LF, 2B	85	186	22	40	8	1	6	19	14	38	.215	2
Steve Baron, C	4	11	0	0	0	0	0	0	0	2	.000	0
Willie Bloomquist, 2B, SS, OF, 3B, 1B	35	69	2	11	1	0	0	4	2	13	.159	1
Robinson Canó, 2B	156	624	82	179	34	1	21	79	43	107	.287	2
Welington Castillo, C, DH	6	25	3	4	0	0	0	2	1	5	.160	0
Nelson Cruz, RF	152	590	90	178	22	1	44	93	59	164	.302	3
Franklin Gutiérrez, OF, DH	59	171	27	50	11	0	15	35	14	54	.292	0
J. A. Happ, P	21	1	0	0	0	0	0	0	1	0	.000	0
Félix Hernández, P	31	3	0	0	0	0	0	0	0	1	.000	0
John Hicks, C, 3B	17	32	1	2	1	0	0	1	1	18	.063	1
Hisashi Iwakuma, P	20	2	0	0	0	0	0	0	0	2	.000	0
Austin Jackson, CF	107	419	46	114	18	3	8	38	24	107	.272	15
James Jones, OF	28	29	1	3	1	0	0	0	2	13	.103	1
Ketel Marte, SS, 2B, CF	57	219	25	62	14	3	2	17	24	43	.283	8
Brad Miller, SS	144	438	44	113	22	4	11	46	47	101	.258	13
Jesús Montero, 1B, DH	38	112	11	25	6	0	5	19	4	32	.223	0
Mike Montgomery, P	16	3	0	0	0	0	0	0	0	2	.000	0
Logan Morrison, 1B	146	457	47	103	15	3	17	54	47	81	.225	8
Vidal Nuño, P	32	2	0	1	0	0	0	1	0	0	.500	0
Shawn O'Malley, CF	24	42	10	11	1	0	1	7	12	14	.262	3
James Paxton, P	13	2	0	0	0	0	0	0	0	2	.000	0
Stefen Romero, RF	13	21	6	4	1	0	1	3	3	6	.190	0
Justin Ruggiano, OF	36	70	8	15	4	0	2	3	11	27	.214	3
Kyle Seager, 3B	161	623	85	166	37	0	26	74	54	98	.266	6
Seth Smith, OF, DH	136	395	54	98	31	5	12	42	47	99	.248	0
Jesús Sucre, C	52	127	9	20	6	0	1	7	6	21	.157	0
Chris Taylor, SS	37	94	9	16	3	1	0	1	6	31	.170	3
Mark Trumbo, OF, DH, 1B	96	334	39	88	13	0	13	41	26	93	.263	0
Taijuan Walker, P	29	9	0	1	1	0	0	1	0	5	.111	0
Rickie Weeks, LF, DH	37	84	7	14	1	0	2	9	9	25	.167	0
Mike Zunino, C	112	350	28	61	11	0	11	28	21	132	.174	0
Team totals	162	5544	656	1379	262	22	198	624	478	1336	.249	69

==== Pitching ====
Note: W = Wins; L = Losses; ERA = Earned run average; G = Games pitched; GS = Games started; SV = Saves; IP = Innings pitched; H = Hits allowed; R = Runs allowed; ER = Earned runs allowed; HR = Home runs allowed; BB = Walks allowed; K = Strikeouts

Player	W	L	ERA	G	GS	SV	IP	H	R	ER	HR	BB	K
Joe Beimel	2	1	3.99	53	0	1	47.1	49	25	21	8	16	22
Roenis Elías	5	8	4.14	22	20	0	115.1	106	57	53	15	44	97
Danny Farquhar	0	3	6.23	25	0	0	30.1	37	23	21	6	12	26
Charlie Furbush	1	1	2.08	33	0	0	21.2	9	6	5	2	5	17
Mayckol Guaipe	0	3	5.40	21	0	0	26.2	34	19	16	5	13	22
J. A. Happ	4	6	4.64	21	20	0	108.2	121	58	56	13	32	82
Félix Hernández	18	9	3.53	31	31	0	201.2	180	80	79	23	58	191
Hisashi Iwakuma	9	5	3.54	20	20	0	129.2	117	53	51	18	21	111
Logan Kensing	2	1	5.87	19	0	0	15.1	12	10	10	2	7	13
Dominic Leone	0	4	6.35	10	0	0	11.1	11	9	8	1	9	7
Mark Lowe	0	1	1.00	34	0	0	36.0	31	6	4	1	11	47
Lucas Luetge	0	0	0.00	1	0	0	2.1	0	0	0	0	2	2
Yoervis Medina	1	0	3.00	12	0	1	12.0	11	5	4	1	7	9
Mike Montgomery	4	6	4.60	16	16	0	90.0	92	49	46	11	37	64
Vidal Nuño	1	4	4.10	32	10	0	74.2	80	35	34	14	17	62
Edgar Olmos	1	0	4.50	6	2	0	14.0	16	8	7	1	8	4
Tyler Olson	1	1	5.40	11	0	0	13.1	18	8	8	2	10	8
James Paxton	3	4	3.90	13	13	0	67.0	67	34	29	8	29	56
J. C. Ramírez	0	1	7.56	8	0	0	8.1	10	7	7	2	7	5
José Ramírez	1	0	11.57	5	0	0	4.2	9	9	6	0	6	3
Rob Rasmussen	2	1	10.67	19	0	0	14.1	25	18	17	2	8	16
Fernando Rodney	5	5	5.68	54	0	16	50.2	51	32	32	8	25	43
David Rollins	0	2	7.56	20	0	0	25.0	37	21	21	3	8	21
Carson Smith	2	5	2.31	70	0	13	70.0	49	19	18	2	22	92
Jesús Sucre	0	0	13.50	2	0	0	2.0	6	3	3	1	0	0
Taijuan Walker	11	8	4.56	29	29	0	169.2	163	92	86	25	40	157
Tom Wilhelmsen	2	2	3.19	53	0	13	62.0	56	24	22	3	29	60
Tony Zych	0	0	2.45	13	1	0	18.1	17	6	5	1	3	24
Team totals	76	86	4.16	162	162	45	1463.0	1430	726	677	181	491	1283

== Farm system ==
Level	Team	League	Manager
AAA	Tacoma Rainiers	Pacific Coast League	Pat Listach
AA	Jackson Generals	Southern League	Jim Horner
A-Advanced	Bakersfield Blaze	California League	Eddie Menchaca
A	Clinton LumberKings	Midwest League	Scott Steinmann
A-Short Season	Everett AquaSox	Northwest League	Rob Mummau
Rookie	AZL Mariners	Arizona League	Darrin Garner
Rookie	DSL Mariners 1	Dominican Summer League	Jose Umbria
Rookie	DSL Mariners 2	Dominican Summer League	
