= 2015 Texas Rangers season =

2015 Texas Rangers
- American League West champions
- League: American League
- Division: West
- Ballpark: Globe Life Park in Arlington
- City: Arlington, Texas
- Record: 88–74 (.543)
- Divisional place: 1st
- Owners: Rangers Baseball Express (Ray Davis and Bob R. Simpson)
- General managers: Jon Daniels
- Managers: Jeff Banister
- Television: Fox Sports Southwest; KTXA (Steve Busby, Tom Grieve, Emily Jones, Mark McLemore, Victor Villaba, José Guzman)
- Radio: KRLD 105.3 FM (English) (Eric Nadel, Matt Hicks, Jared Sandler); KZMP 1540 AM (Spanish) (Eleno Orlenas, Jerry Romo, Benji Gil)
- Stats: ESPN.com; Baseball Reference

The 2015 Texas Rangers season was the Rangers' 55th season of the franchise and the 44th since the team relocated to Arlington, Texas. After a disastrous 2014 season in which the Rangers finished last in the entire American League and third worst in all of Major League Baseball (MLB), and despite starting the season with an 8–16 record and being under .500 as late as August 13, the Rangers would clinch the American League West title on the final day of the season. It was the team's sixth division title and seventh postseason appearance in franchise history. They lost to the Toronto Blue Jays in five games in the ALDS, even after taking a 2-1 lead. First year manager Jeff Banister was named the AL Manager of the Year.

== Offseason ==
October 30: Colby Lewis, Neal Cotts and Scott Baker become free agents.

- Lewis re-signed with the Rangers.
- Cotts signed with the Milwaukee Brewers.
- Baker signed with the New York Yankees.

October 31: Sent 3 players to the minors.

November 20: Promoted 4 players from the minors, released 2, signed 3 to a minor league contract (2 with an invite to spring training), and sent Daniel Robertson to the Los Angeles Angels for an unnamed player.

November 24: Released Jim Adduci and signed Ed Lucas to a minor league contract and invited him to spring training.

December 2: Adam Rosales, Michael Kirkman, and Alexi Ogando become free agents.

- Rosales and Kirkman resigned with the Rangers.
- Ogando signed with the Boston Red Sox.

December 8: Claimed Scott Barnes off waivers from the Baltimore Orioles.

- He would be sent to the minors and claimed off waivers by the Toronto Blue Jays.

December 11: Signed 3 players to a minor league contract and invited them to Spring training, while drafting Delino DeShields.

December 12: Received Ross Detwiler from the Washington Nationals for Chris Bostick and Abel De Los Santos.

December 14: Signed J. T. Wise to a minor league contract and invited him to spring training.

December 15: Signed Francisco Mendoza to a minor league contract.

December 16: Signed Kyuji Fujikawa. Also signed 3 players to a minor league contract with 2 receiving an invite to spring training.

December 18: Signed Mike McDade to a minor league contract.

Week of January 5: Signed Adam Rosales and gave 2 players a minor league contract (1 with an invite to spring training).

Week of January 12: Signed 7 players to a minor league contract and invited 1 of them to spring training.

Week of January 19: Received Yovani Gallardo and cash from the Milwaukee Brewers for Corey Knebel, Luis Sardinas, and Marcos Diplan and received Gonzalez Germen from the Yankees for cash. Signed Juan Perez and Ross Ohlendorf to a minor league contract and invited 6 others to spring training.

- Germen would be claimed by the Chicago Cubs off waivers.
- Ohlendorf received an invite to spring training.

January 27: Received Anthony Ranaudo from the Boston Red Sox for Robbie Ross, Jr.

January 28: Signed 2 players to a minor league contract.

February 3: Invited Martire Garcia to spring training.

February 4: Signed Ryan Ludwick to a minor league contract and invited him to spring training.

February 6: Signed Nate Schierholtz to a minor league contract and invited him to spring training.

== Regular season ==
=== Season standings ===
==== American League West ====
AL West
Team	W	L	Pct.	GB	Home	Road
Texas Rangers	88	74	.543	—	43‍–‍38	45‍–‍36
Houston Astros	86	76	.531	2	53‍–‍28	33‍–‍48
Los Angeles Angels of Anaheim	85	77	.525	3	49‍–‍32	36‍–‍45
Seattle Mariners	76	86	.469	12	36‍–‍45	40‍–‍41
Oakland Athletics	68	94	.420	20	34‍–‍47	34‍–‍47

Division leaders
Team	W	L	Pct.
Kansas City Royals	95	67	.586
Toronto Blue Jays	93	69	.574
Texas Rangers	88	74	.543

Wild Card teams (Top 2 teams qualify for postseason)
Team	W	L	Pct.	GB
New York Yankees	87	75	.537	+1
Houston Astros	86	76	.531	—
Los Angeles Angels of Anaheim	85	77	.525	1
Minnesota Twins	83	79	.512	3
Cleveland Indians	81	80	.503	4½
Baltimore Orioles	81	81	.500	5
Tampa Bay Rays	80	82	.494	6
Boston Red Sox	78	84	.481	8
Chicago White Sox	76	86	.469	10
Seattle Mariners	76	86	.469	10
Detroit Tigers	74	87	.460	11½
Oakland Athletics	68	94	.420	18

==== Record against opponents ====
2015 American League record Source: MLB Standings Grid – 2015
Team	BAL	BOS	CWS	CLE	DET	HOU	KC	LAA	MIN	NYY	OAK	SEA	TB	TEX	TOR	NL
Baltimore	—	11–8	3–3	5–1	4–3	3–4	3–4	2–4	0–7	10–9	6–1	3–3	10–9	1–6	8–11	12–8
Boston	8–11	—	3–4	2–4	4–2	2–4	4–3	2–5	2–5	8–11	5–1	4–3	9–10	2–5	10–9	13–7
Chicago	3–3	4–3	—	10–9	9–10	5–1	7–12	4–3	6–13	2–5	5–2	4–3	1–5	3–3	4–3	9–11
Cleveland	1–5	4–2	9–10	—	7–11	5–2	9–10	4–2	7–12	5–2	3–4	4–3	5–2	3–3	3–4	12–8
Detroit	3–4	2–4	10–9	11–7	—	3–4	9–10	1–6	11–8	2–5	2–4	4–3	3–3	2–5	2–4	9–11
Houston	4–3	4–2	1–5	2–5	4–3	—	4–2	10–9	3–3	4–3	10–9	12–7	2–5	6–13	4–3	16–4
Kansas City	4–3	3–4	12–7	10–9	10–9	2–4	—	6–1	12–7	2–4	5–1	4–2	6–1	3–4	3–4	13–7
Los Angeles	4–2	5–2	3–4	2–4	6–1	9–10	1–6	—	5–2	2–4	11–8	12–7	3–3	12–7	2–5	8–12
Minnesota	7–0	5–2	13–6	12–7	8–11	3–3	7–12	2–5	—	1–5	4–3	4–3	4–2	3–3	2–5	8–12
New York	9–10	11–8	5–2	2–5	5–2	3–4	4–2	4–2	5–1	—	3–4	5–1	12–7	2–5	6–13	11–9
Oakland	1–6	1–5	2–5	4–3	4–2	9–10	1–5	8–11	3–4	4–3	—	6–13	3–4	10–9	1–5	11–9
Seattle	3–3	3–4	3–4	3–4	3–4	7–12	2–4	7–12	3–4	1–5	13–6	—	4–3	12–7	4–2	8–12
Tampa Bay	9–10	10–9	5–1	2–5	3–3	5–2	1–6	3–3	2–4	7–12	4–3	3–4	—	2–5	10–9	14–6
Texas	6–1	5–2	3–3	3–3	5–2	13–6	4–3	7–12	3–3	5–2	9–10	7–12	5–2	—	2–4	11–9
Toronto	11–8	9–10	3–4	4–3	4–2	3–4	4–3	5–2	5–2	13–6	5–1	2–4	9–10	4–2	—	12–8

=== Season summary ===
The Rangers would start the season as poorly as their 2014 season ended, reaching a season low eight games under .500 (8-16) on May 3. The lone bright spot was the resurgence of Prince Fielder from season-ending surgery the prior year. At the All-Star break, the Rangers improved slightly, but were still under .500 (42-46).

The second half of the season would see the team begin a resurgence, led in part by the acquisition of Cole Hamels, the emergence of Shawn Tolleson as the team's closer, the returns of Martin Perez and Derek Holland from the disabled list, and improved play by Shin-Soo Choo and Adrián Beltré. However, as late as August 3, the Rangers were still below .500. The improved play continued, and on September 15 (during a four-game home series against their in-state and division rivals the Houston Astros), the Rangers would defeat the Astros 6-5, taking the division lead in the process and ultimately sweeping the series. The Rangers would not relinquish the division lead from that point forward, though they would not clinch the division until the last day of the season when they defeated the Los Angeles Angels 9-2 behind a complete game effort from Hamels.

=== Game log ===
2015 Game Log
April: 7–14 (Home: 2–7; Away: 5–7 )

#	Date	Opponent	Score	Win	Loss	Save	Attendance	Record
1	April 6	@ Athletics	**L** 0–8	S. Gray (1-0)	**Y. Gallardo** (0-1)	—	36,067	0–1
2	April 7	@ Athletics	**W** 3–1	**C. Lewis** (1-0)	J. Hahn (0-1)	**N. Feliz** (1)	15,025	1–1
3	April 8	@ Athletics	**L** 0–10	S. Kazmir (1-0)	**R. Detwiler** (0-1)	—	19,479	1–2
4	April 9	@ Athletics	**W** 10-1	**N. Martinez** (1-0)	K. Graveman (0-1)	—	16,045	2–2
5	April 10	Astros	**L** 1–5	C. McHugh (1-0)	**D. Holland** (0-1)	—	48,885	2–3
6	April 11	Astros	**W** 6–2	**Y. Gallardo** (1-1)	R. Hernandez (0-1)	—	36,833	3–3
7	April 12	Astros	**L** 6–4 (14)	W. Harris (1-0)	**L. Verrett** (0-1)	S. Deduno (1)	35,276	3–4
8	April 13	Angels	**L** 3–6	M. Shoemaker (2-0)	**R. Detwiler** (0-2)	H. Street (3)	18,401	3–5
9	April 14	Angels	**W** 8–2	**N. Martinez** (2-0)	D. Rucinski (0-1)	—	21,805	4–5
10	April 15	Angels	**L** 2–10	H. Santiago (1-1)	**A. Ranaudo** (0-1)	—	25,575	4–6
11	April 17	@ Mariners	**W** 3–1	**Y. Gallardo** (2-1)	J. Happ (0-1)	**N. Feliz** (2)	36,606	5–6
12	April 18	@ Mariners	**L** 1–3	F. Hernandez (2-0)	**C. Lewis** (1-1)	F. Rodney (3)	43,017	5–7
13	April 19	@ Mariners	**L** 10–11	Y. Medina (1-0)	**N. Feliz** (0-1)	—	31,601	5–8
14	April 21	@ D-backs	**W** 7–1	**S. Tolleson** (1-0)	D. Hudson (0-1)	—	18,345	6–8
15	April 22	@ D-backs	**L** 5–8	A. Bradley (2-0)	**Y. Gallardo** (2-2)	—	17,886	6–9
16	April 24	@ Angels	**L** 2–3	G. Richards (1-1)	**K. Kela** (0-1)	H. Street (6)	41,054	6–10
17	April 25	@ Angels	**L** 1–4	V. Pestano (1-0)	**C. Lewis** (1-2)	H. Street (7)	38,016	6–11
18	April 26	@ Angels	**W** 5–4 (11)	**N. Feliz** (1-1)	J. Alvarez (0-1)	—	35,053	7–11
19	April 27	Mariners	**L** 1–3	T. Walker (1-2)	**Y. Gallardo** (2-3)	F. Rodney (5)	19,748	7–12
20	April 28	Mariners	**L** 1–2	J. Happ (2-1)	**R. Detwiler** (0-3)	F. Rodney (6)	23,714	7–13
21	April 29	Mariners	**L** 5–2	F. Hernandez (4-0)	**W. Rodriguez** (0-1)	F. Rodney (7)	26,037	7–14

May: 19–11 (Home: 7–7; Away: 12–4 )

#	Date	Opponent	Score	Win	Loss	Save	Attendance	Record
22	May 1	Athletics	**L** 5–7	D. Otero (2-1)	**R. Mendez** (0-1)	T. Clippard (2)	29,700	7–15
23	May 2	Athletics	**W** 8–7 (10)	**K. Kela** (1-1)	R. Cook (0-2)	—	32,207	8–15
24	May 3	Athletics	**L** 1–7	S. Gray (4-0)	**Y. Gallardo** (2-4)	—	36,006	8–16
25	May 4	@ Astros	**W** 2–1	**K. Kela** (2-1)	C. Qualls (0-2)	**N. Feliz** (3)	17,597	9–16
26	May 5	@ Astros	**W** 7–1	**W. Rodriguez** (1-1)	S. Feldman (2-3)	—	20,951	10–16
27	May 6	@ Astros	**W** 11–3	**C. Lewis** (2-2)	S. Deduno (0-1)	—	22,230	11–16
28	May 7	@ Rays	**W** 5–4	**A. Claudio** (1-0)	C. Archer (3-4)	**N. Feliz** (4)	8,701	12–16
29	May 8	@ Rays	**L** 2–8	N. Karns (2-1)	**Y. Gallardo** (2-5)	—	11,704	12–17
30	May 9	@ Rays	**L** 2–7	A. Bellatti (1-0)	**R. Detwiler** (0-4)	B. Boxberger (8)	20,943	12–18
31	May 10	@ Rays	**W** 2–1	**K. Kela** (3-1)	K. Jepsen (0-2)	**N. Feliz** (5)	14,521	13–18
32	May 11	Royals	**W** 8–2	**C. Lewis** (3-2)	D. Duffy (2-2)	—	36,006	14–18
33	May 12	Royals	**L** 6–7 (10)	G. Holland (1-0)	**S. Pimentel** (0-1)	—	23,659	14–19
34	May 13	Royals	**W** 5–2	**Y. Gallardo** (3-5)	Y. Ventura (2-3)	**N. Feliz** (6)	26,258	15–19
35	May 14	Royals	**L** 3–6	J. Guthrie (3-2)	**R. Detwiler** (0-5)	G. Holland (5)	33,818	15–20
36	May 15	Indians	**L** 3–8	R. Webb (1-0)	**W. Rodriguez** (1-2)	—	29,524	15–21
37	May 16	Indians	**L** 8–10	S. Atchison (1-1)	**N. Feliz** (1-2)	C. Allen (6)	31,045	15–22
38	May 17	Indians	**W** 5–1	**N. Martinez** (3-0)	C. Carrasco (4-4)	—	32,189	16–22
39	May 19	@ Red Sox	**L** 3–4	W. Miley (3-4)	**Y. Gallardo** (3-6)	K. Uehara (10)	36,580	16–23
40	May 20	@ Red Sox	**W** 2–1	**P. Klein** (1-0)	J. Kelly (1-3)	**S. Tolleson** (1)	35,726	17–23
41	May 21	@ Red Sox	**W** 3–1	**W. Rodriguez** (2-2)	C. Buchholz (2-5)	**S. Tolleson** (2)	34,945	18–23
42	May 22	@ Yankees	**W** 10–9	**C. Lewis** (4-2)	M. Pineda (5-2)	**R. Ohlendorf** (1)	40,008	19–23
43	May 23	@ Yankees	**W** 15–4	**N. Martinez** (4-0)	C. Sabathia (2-6)	—	42,067	20–23
44	May 24	@ Yankees	**W** 5–2	**Y. Gallardo** (4-6)	C. Capuano (0-2)	**S. Tolleson** (3)	45,681	21–23
45	May 25	@ Indians	**W** 10–8	**T. Scheppers** (1-0)	M. Rzepczynski (1-2)	**S. Tolleson** (4)	13,614	22–23
46	May 26	@ Indians	**W** 4–3	**K. Kela** (4-1)	N. Hagadone (0-1)	**S. Tolleson** (5)	11,352	23–23
47	May 27	@ Indians	**L** 3–12	C. Carrasco (6-4)	**C. Lewis** (4-3)	—	15,936	23-24
48	May 28	Red Sox	**L** 5–1	E. Rodriguez (1-0)	**N. Martinez** (4-1)	—	34,085	23–25
49	May 29	Red Sox	**W** 7–4	**Y. Gallardo** (5-6)	S. Wright (2-2)	**S. Tolleson** (6)	38,176	24–25
50	May 30	Red Sox	**W** 8–0	**C. Gonzalez** (1-0)	W. Miley (4-5)	—	42,831	25–25
51	May 31	Red Sox	**W** 4–3	**R. Ohlendorf** (1-0)	K. Uehara (2-2)	—	32,848	26–25

June: 14–13 (Home: 6–5; Away: 8–8 )

#	Date	Opponent	Score	Win	Loss	Save	Attendance	Record
52	June 2	White Sox	**W** 15–2	**C. Lewis** (5-3)	J. Samardzija (4-3)	—	27,558	27–25
53	June 3	White Sox	**L** 2–9	C. Sale (5-2)	**N. Martinez** (4-2)	—	32,598	27–26
54	June 4	White Sox	**W** 2–1 (11)	**T. Scheppers** (2-0)	D. Jennings (1-2)	—	27,616	28–26
55	June 5	@ Royals	**W** 4–0	**C. Gonzalez** (2-0)	E. Volquez (4-4)	—	38,159	29–26
56	June 6	@ Royals	**W** 4–2	**W. Rodriguez** (3-2)	Y. Ventura (3-5)	**S. Tolleson** (7)	37,924	30–26
57	June 7	@ Royals	**L** 3–4	W. Davis (3-1)	**K. Kela** (4-2)	G. Holland (9)	38,202	30–27
58	June 9	@ Athletics	**W** 2–1	**N. Martinez** (5-2)	S. Gray (7-3)	**S. Tolleson** (8)	14,617	31–27
59	June 10	@ Athletics	**L** 4–5	T. Clippard (1-3)	**K. Kela** (4-3)	—	14,290	31–28
60	June 11	@ Athletics	**L** 0–7	S. Kazmir (3–4)	**C. Gonzalez** (2-1)	—	14,489	31–29
61	June 12	Twins	**W** 6–2	**T. Scheppers** (3-0)	A. Thompson (1-2)	—	41,765	32–29
62	June 13	Twins	**W** 11–7	**C. Lewis** (6-3)	M. Pelfrey (5-3)	—	28,661	33–29
63	June 14	Twins	**L** 4–3	C. Fien (2-2)	**S. Tolleson** (1-1)	G. Perkins (22)	33,970	33–30
64	June 15	Dodgers	**W** 4–1	**Y. Gallardo** (6-6)	C. Frias (4-4)	**S. Tolleson** (9)	32,248	34–30
65	June 16	Dodgers	**W** 3–2	**S. Tolleson** (2-1)	J. Ravin (2-1)	—	31,897	35–30
66	June 17	@ Dodgers	**W** 5–3	**W. Rodriguez** (4-2)	C. Kershaw (5-4)	**K. Kela** (1)	42,906	36–30
67	June 18	@ Dodgers	**L** 0–1	K. Jansen (2-0)	**K. Kela** (4-4)	—	46,977	36–31
68	June 19	@ White Sox	**W** 2-1	**C. Lewis** (7-3)	D. Robertson (4-2)	**S. Tolleson** (10)	22,864	37–31
69	June 20	@ White Sox	**L** 2-3	C. Rodon (3-1)	**N. Martinez** (5-3)	D. Robertson (14)	25,738	37–32
70	June 21	@ White Sox	**L** 2-3	J. Petricka (2-2)	**A. Claudio** (1-1)	–	33,668	37-33
71	June 23	Athletics	**L** 6-8	J. Chavez (4-6)	**C. Gonzalez** (2-2)	D. Pomeranz (1)	35,889	37-34
72	June 24	Athletics	**L** 2-8	K. Graveman (4-4)	**W. Rodriguez** (4-3)	—	34,216	37-35
73	June 25	Athletics	**L** 3-6	S. Gray (9-3)	**K. Kela** (4-5)	—	29,251	37-36
74	June 26	@ Blue Jays	**L** 2-12	M. Buehrle (8-4)	**N. Martinez** (5-4)	—	25,821	37-37
75	June 27	@ Blue Jays	**W** 4-0	**Y. Gallardo** (7-6)	M. Boyd (0-1)	—	37,167	38-37
76	June 28	@ Blue Jays	**L** 2-3	D. Hutchison (8-1)	**C. Gonzalez** (2-3)	—	42,376	38-38
77	June 29	@ Orioles	**W** 8-1	**W. Rodriguez** (5-3)	B. Norris (2-7)	—	21,565	39-38
78	June 30	@ Orioles	**W** 8-6	**C. Lewis** (8-3)	M. Gonzalez (6-5)	**S. Tolleson** (11)	27,370	40-38

July: 10–14 (Home: 4–9; Away: 6–5 )

#	Date	Opponent	Score	Win	Loss	Save	Attendance	Record
79	July 1	@ Orioles	**L** 2-4	W. Chen (4-4)	**N. Martinez** (5-5)	Z. Britton (23)	23,019	40-39
80	July 2	@ Orioles	**W** 2-0	**K. Kela** (5-5)	C. Roe (2-1)	**S. Tolleson** (12)	31,915	41-39
81	July 3	Angels	**L** 2-8	G. Richards (9-5)	**C. Gonzalez** (2-4)	—	39,320	41-40
82	July 4	Angels	**L** 0-13	H. Santiago (5-4)	**W. Rodriguez** (5-4)	—	47,877	41-41
83	July 5	Angels	**L** 6-12	C. Wilson (7-6)	**C. Lewis** (8-4)	—	28,638	41-42
84	July 7	D-backs	**L** 2-4	R. Ray (3-4)	**Y. Gallardo** (7-7)	B. Ziegler (13)	30,955	41-43
85	July 8	D-backs	**L** 4-7	R. Delgado (4-2)	**M. Harrison** (0-1)	B. Ziegler (14)	27,390	41-44
86	July 10	Padres	**W** 4-3	**W. Rodriguez** (6-4)	I. Kennedy (4-9)	**S. Tolleson** (13)	33,033	42-44
87	July 11	Padres	**L** 5-6	J. Benoit (6-4)	**S. Tolleson** (2-2)	C. Kimbrel (22)	36,248	42-45
88	July 12	Padres	**L** 1-2	T. Ross (6-7)	**Y. Gallardo** (7-8)	C. Kimbrel (23)	32,428	42-46
–	July 14	86th All-Star Game	National League vs. American League (Great American Ball Park, Cincinnati)					
89	July 17	@ Astros	**L** 2–3	C. McHugh (10-5)	**M. Perez** (0-1)	L. Gregerson (19)	36,904	42–47
90	July 18	@ Astros	**W** 7–6	**C. Lewis** (9-4)	S. Feldman (4-5)	**S. Tolleson** (14)	41,941	43–47
91	July 19	@ Astros	**L** 0–10	D. Keuchel (12-4)	**Y. Gallardo** (7-9)	—	36,532	43–48
92	July 20	@ Rockies	**L** 7–8	J. Axford (2-2)	**T. Scheppers** (3-1)	—	35,027	43–49
93	July 21	@ Rockies	**W** 9–0	**M. Harrison** (1-1)	K. Kendrick (3-11)	—	43,012	44–49
94	July 22	@ Rockies	**W** 10–8	**T. Scheppers** (4-1)	J. Axford (2-3)	**S. Tolleson** (15)	33,348	45–49
95	July 24	@ Angels	**W** 4–2	**C. Lewis** (10-4)	N. Tropeano (1-1)	**S. Tolleson** (16)	42,046	46–49
96	July 25	@ Angels	**W** 7–6	**S. Patton** (1-0)	J. Smith (4-3)	**S. Tolleson** (17)	43,052	47–49
97	July 26	@ Angels	**L** 7–13	A. Heaney (5-0)	**N. Martinez** (5-6)	—	38,539	47–50
98	July 27	Yankees	**L** 2–6	I. Nova (3-3)	**M. Harrison** (1-2)	—	33,691	47–51
99	July 28	Yankees	**L** 5–21	D. Moreno (1-0)	**M. Perez** (0-2)	A. Warren (1)	28,403	47–52
100	July 29	Yankees	**W** 5–2	**C. Lewis** (11-4)	M. Tanaka (7-4)	**S. Tolleson** (18)	31,658	48–52
101	July 30	Yankees	**W** 7–6	**S. Tolleson** (3-2)	A. Miller (0-2)	—	34,407	49–52
102	July 31	Giants	**W** 6–3	**N. Martinez** (6-6)	M. Bumgarner (11-6)	—	30,674	50–52

August: 18–10 (Home: 13–4; Away: 5–6)

#	Date	Opponent	Score	Win	Loss	Save	Attendance	Record
103	August 1	Giants	**L** 7-9	H. Strickland (2-1)	**S. Dyson** (3-4)	S. Casilla (27)	41,114	50–53
104	August 2	Giants	**W** 2-1	**M. Perez** (1-2)	M. Leake (9-6)	**S. Dyson** (1)	22,234	51–53
105	August 3	Astros	**W** 12-9	**C. Lewis** (12-4)	L. McCullers (5-4)	**S. Tolleson** (19)	21,671	52–53
106	August 4	Astros	**W** 4-3	**Y. Gallardo** (8-9)	D. Straily (0-1)	**S. Tolleson** (20)	29,953	53–53
107	August 5	Astros	**W** 4-3	**N. Martinez** (7-6)	S. Kazmir (6-6)	**S. Dyson** (2)	31,782	54–53
108	August 7	@ Mariners	**L** 3-4	H. Iwakuma (3-2)	**C. Hamels** (6-8)	C. Smith (11)	29,320	54–54
109	August 8	@ Mariners	**W** 11-3 (11)	**S. Tolleson** (4-2)	R. Rasmussen (1-1)	—	39,132	55–54
110	August 9	@ Mariners	**L** 2-4	F. Hernandez (14-6)	**C. Lewis** (12-5)	C. Smith (12)	29,939	55–55
111	August 11	@ Twins	**L** 2-3	G. Perkins (1-3)	**S. Patton** (1-1)	—	26,663	55–56
112	August 12	@ Twins	**L** 1–11	M. Pelfrey (6–7)	**N. Martinez** (7–7)	—	30,683	55–57
113	August 13	@ Twins	**W** 6-5	**K. Kela** (6-5)	C. Fien (2-5)	**S. Tolleson** (21)	30,357	56–57
114	August 14	Rays	**W** 5-3	**S. Dyson** (4-4)	J. McGee (1-2)	**S. Tolleson** (22)	32,512	57–57
115	August 15	Rays	**W** 12-4	**C. Lewis** (13-5)	C. Archer (10-9)	—	32,351	58–57
116	August 16	Rays	**W** 5-3	**Y. Gallardo** (9-9)	D. Smyly (0-2)	**S. Tolleson** (23)	29,167	59–57
117	August 17	Mariners	**W** 4-3	**S. Tolleson** (5-2)	F. Rodney (5-5)	—	19,880	60–57
118	August 18	Mariners	**L** 2-3	H. Iwakuma (5-2)	**C. Gonzalez** (2-5)	C. Smith (13)	26,870	60–58
119	August 19	Mariners	**W** 7-2	**D. Holland** (1-1)	M. Montgomery (4-6)	—	20,142	61–58
120	August 20	@ Tigers	**L** 0-4	A. Simon (11-7)	**M. Perez** (1-3)	—	33,727	61–59
121	August 21	@ Tigers	**W** 2-0	**C. Lewis** (14-5)	J. Verlander (1-6)	**S. Tolleson** (24)	34,718	62–59
122	August 22	@ Tigers	**W** 5-3	**Y. Gallardo** (10-9)	R. Wolf (0-1)	—	39,082	63–59
123	August 23	@ Tigers	**W** 4-2	**C. Hamels** (7-8)	M. Boyd (1-4)	**S. Tolleson** (25)	39,317	64–59
124	August 25	Blue Jays	**L** 5-6	L. Hawkins (3-1)	**S. Tolleson** (5-3)	R. Osuna (15)	22,227	64–60
125	August 26	Blue Jays	**L** 4-12	D. Price (13-4)	**C. Lewis** (14-6)	—	20,572	64–61
126	August 27	Blue Jays	**W** 4-1	**Y. Gallardo** (11-9)	M. Estrada (11-8)	**S. Tolleson** (26)	17,884	65–61
127	August 28	Orioles	**W** 4-1	**C. Hamels** (8-8)	K. Gausman (2-6)	**S. Tolleson** (27)	28,337	66–61
128	August 29	Orioles	**W** 4-3	**M. Perez** (2-3)	U. Jimenez (9-9)	**S. Tolleson** (28)	29,768	67–61
129	August 30	Orioles	**W** 6-0	**D. Holland** (2-1)	M. Gonzalez (9-11)	—	22,256	68–61
130	August 31	@ Padres	**L** 0-7	T. Ross (10-9)	**C. Lewis** (14-7)	—	19,013	68–62

September: 18–10 (Home: 9–4; Away: 9–6 )

#	Date	Opponent	Score	Win	Loss	Save	Attendance	Record
131	September 1	@ Padres	**W** 8-6	**R. Ohlendorf** (2-0)	M. Rzepczynski (2-4)	—	21,215	69–62
132	September 2	@ Padres	**W** 4-3 (10)	**S. Dyson** (5-4)	B. Norris (3-10)	—	18,730	70–62
133	September 4	@ Angels	**L** 2-5	G. Richards (13-10)	**M. Perez** (2-4)	H. Street (32)	37,073	70–63
134	September 5	@ Angels	**W** 2-1	**D. Holland** (3-1)	J. Smith (4-5)	**S. Tolleson** (29)	39,889	71–63
135	September 6	@ Angels	**L** 0-7	H. Santiago (8-9)	**C. Lewis** (14-8)	—	38,367	71–64
136	September 7	@ Mariners	**W** 3-0	**Y. Gallardo** (12-9)	R. Elias (4-8)	**S. Tolleson** (30)	18,469	72–64
137	September 8	@ Mariners	**W** 9-6	**C. Hamels** (9-8)	T. Walker (10-8)	**S. Tolleson** (31)	13,389	73–64
138	September 9	@ Mariners	**L** 0-6	V. Nuno (1-2)	**M. Perez** (2-5)	—	14,330	73–65
139	September 10	@ Mariners	**L** 0-5	F. Hernandez (17-8)	**D. Holland** (3-2)	—	16,842	73–66
140	September 11	Athletics	**W** 4-0	**C. Lewis** (15-8)	J. Chavez (7-15)	—	28,133	74–66
141	September 12	Athletics	**L** 3-5	S. Nolin (1-1)	**Y. Gallardo** (12-10)	—	30,487	74–67
142	September 13	Athletics	**W** 12-4	**C. Gonzalez** (3-5)	F. Doubront (3-2)	—	26,131	75–67
143	September 14	Astros	**W** 5-3	**K. Kela** (7-5)	W. Harris (5-4)	**S. Tolleson** (32)	27,772	76–67
144	September 15	Astros	**W** 6-5	**S. Tolleson** (6-3)	O. Perez (0-2)	—	26,942	77–67
145	September 16	Astros	**W** 14-3	**M. Perez** (3-5)	D. Keuchel (17-8)	—	34,483	78–67
146	September 17	Astros	**W** 8-2	**C. Lewis** (16-8)	L. McCullers (5-6)	—	31,122	79–67
147	September 18	Mariners	**L** 1-3	D. Farquhar (1-4)	**Y. Gallardo** (12-11)	T. Wilhelmsen (12)	26,727	79–68
148	September 19	Mariners	**W** 10-1	**C. Hamels** (10-8)	V. Nuno (1-3)	—	39,843	80–68
149	September 20	Mariners	**L** 2-9	F. Hernandez (18-9)	**D. Holland** (3-3)	—	33,307	80–69
150	September 22	@ Athletics	**W** 8-6	**C. Gonzalez** (4-5)	D. Pomeranz (5-6)	**S. Tolleson** (33)	16,524	81–69
151	September 23	@ Athletics	**W** 10-3	**C. Lewis** (17-8)	F. Doubront (3-3)	—	16,445	82–69
152	September 24	@ Athletics	**W** 8-1	**C. Hamels** (11-8)	C. Bassitt (1-7)	—	14,452	83–69
153	September 25	@ Astros	**W** 6-2	**R. Ohlendorf** (3-0)	S. Kazmir (7-11)	—	35,180	84–69
154	September 26	@ Astros	**L** 7-9	C. McHugh (18-7)	**C. Gonzalez** (4-6)	W. Harris (2)	35,736	84–70
155	September 27	@ Astros	**L** 2-4	D. Keuchel (19-8)	**M. Perez** (3-6)	L. Gregerson (29)	36,084	84–71
156	September 28	Tigers	**L** 4-7	J. Verlander (5-8)	**C. Lewis** (17-9)	N. Feliz (10)	27,847	84–72
157	September 29	Tigers	**W** 7-6	**C. Hamels** (12-8)	B. Farmer (0-4)	**S. Tolleson** (34)	28,729	85–72
158	September 30	Tigers	**W** 6-2	**Y. Gallardo** (13-11)	M. Boyd (1-6)	—	28,633	86–72

October: 2–2 (Home: 2–2; Away: 0–0 )

#	Date	Opponent	Score	Win	Loss	Save	Attendance	Record
159	October 1	Angels	**W** 5-3	**D. Holland** (4-3)	A. Heaney (6-4)	**S. Tolleson** (35)	32,338	87–72
160	October 2	Angels	**L** 1–2	M. Morin (4-2)	**S. Tolleson** (6-4)	J. Smith (4)	47,219	87–73
161	October 3	Angels	**L** 10-11	J. Reyes (1-0)	**R. Ohlendorf** (3-1)	J. Smith (5)	37,271	87–74
162	October 4	Angels	**W** 9-2	**C. Hamels** (13-8)	G. Richards (15-12)	—	45,772	88–74

Legend: = Win = Loss = Postponement
Bold = Rangers team member

== Postseason ==
=== Game log ===
2015 Post-season Game Log
ALDS vs. Blue Jays (2–3)

#	Date	Opponent	Score	Win	Loss	Save	Attendance	Record
1	October 8	@ Blue Jays	**W** 5–3	**Y. Gallardo** (1–0)	D. Price (0–1)	**S. Dyson** (1)	49,834	1–0
2	October 9	@ Blue Jays	**W** 6–4 (14)	**K. Kela** (1–0)	L. Hawkins (0–1)	**R. Ohlendorf** (1)	49,716	2–0
3	October 11	Blue Jays	**L** 1–5	M. Estrada (1–0)	**M. Perez** (0–1)		50,941	2–1
4	October 12	Blue Jays	**L** 4–8	D. Price (1–1)	**D. Holland** (0–1)		47,679	2–2
5	October 14	@ Blue Jays	**L** 3–6	A. Sanchez (1–0)	**C. Hamels** (0–1)	R. Osuna (1)	49,742	2–3

Legend: = Win = Loss = Postponement
Bold = Rangers team member

=== Postseason rosters ===
Playoff rosters
American League Division Series

- Pitchers: 21 Chi Chi González 33 Martín Pérez 35 Cole Hamels 37 Shawn Tolleson 41 Jake Diekman 45 Derek Holland 47 Sam Dyson 48 Colby Lewis 49 Yovani Gallardo 50 Keone Kela 51 Ross Ohlendorf
- Catchers: 38 Chris Gimenez 61 Robinson Chirinos
- Infielders: 1 Elvis Andrus 12 Rougned Odor 18 Mitch Moreland 25 Mike Napoli 29 Adrián Beltré 68 Hanser Alberto
- Outfielders: 7 Delino DeShields Jr. 15 Drew Stubbs 17 Shin-Soo Choo 30 Will Venable 32 Josh Hamilton
- Designated hitters: 84 Prince Fielder

== Roster ==
2015 Texas Rangers
Roster
Pitchers: 63 Anthony Bass; 58 Alex Claudio; 47 Ross Detwiler; 41 Jake Diekman; 47 Sam Dyson; 36 Jon Edwards; 56 Andrew Faulkner; 30 Neftalí Feliz; 71 Sam Freeman; 21 Kyuji Fujikawa; 49 Yovani Gallardo; 21 Chi Chi Gonzalez; 35 Cole Hamels; 54 Matt Harrison; 45 Derek Holland; 53 Luke Jackson; 50 Keone Kela; 35,43 Phil Klein; 48 Colby Lewis; 22 Nick Martinez; 55 Román Méndez; 25,51 Ross Ohlendorf; 44 Spencer Patton; 33 Martín Pérez; 57 Stolmy Pimentel; 46 Anthony Ranaudo; 25,51 Wandy Rodríguez; 52 Tanner Scheppers; 37 Shawn Tolleson; 41 Logan Verrett	Catchers: 61 Robinson Chirinos; 3 Carlos Corporán; 38 Chris Gimenez; 6 Tomás Telis; 8 Bobby Wilson; Infielders: 68 Hanser Alberto; 1 Elvis Andrus; 29 Adrián Beltré; 88 Kyle Blanks; 39 Thomas Field; 84 Prince Fielder; 18 Mitch Moreland; 25 Mike Napoli; 12 Rougned Odor; 9 Adam Rosales	Outfielders: 15 Michael Choice; 17 Shin-Soo Choo; 7 Delino DeShields; 13 Joey Gallo; 32 Josh Hamilton; 2 Leonys Martín; 43 Carlos Peguero; 16 Ryan Rua; 20 Jake Smolinski; 20 Ryan Strausborger; 15 Drew Stubbs; 30 Will Venable	Manager: 28 Jeff Banister; Coaches: 27 Tony Beasley (third base); 24 Steve Buechele (bench); 66 Josh Frasier (bullpen catcher); 40 Andy Hawkins (bullpen); 5 Bobby Jones (assistant hitting); 31 Mike Maddux (pitching); 14 Dave Magadan (hitting); 4 Héctor Ortiz (first base); 60 Jayce Tingler (field)

== Statistics ==
Through 2015 season

=== Batting ===
Note: G = Games played; AB = At bats; R = Runs scored; H = Hits; 2B = Doubles; 3B = Triples; HR = Home runs; RBI = Runs batted in; BB = Base on balls; SO = Strikeouts; AVG = Batting average; SB = Stolen bases

Player	G	AB	R	H	2B	3B	HR	RBI	BB	SO	AVG	SB
Hanser Alberto, 2B	41	99	12	22	2	1	0	4	2	17	.222	1
Elvis Andrus, SS	160	596	69	154	34	2	7	62	46	78	.258	25
Adrián Beltré, 3B	143	567	83	163	32	4	18	83	41	65	.287	1
Kyle Blanks, 1B, LF	18	67	10	21	5	0	3	6	4	20	.313	1
Robinson Chirinos, C	78	233	33	54	16	1	10	34	28	62	.232	0
Michael Choice, RF	1	1	0	0	0	0	0	0	0	1	.000	0
Shin-Soo Choo, RF	149	555	94	153	32	3	22	82	76	147	.276	4
Carlos Corporán, C	33	107	10	19	4	0	3	15	6	40	.178	0
Delino DeShields, Jr., LF, CF	121	425	83	111	22	10	2	37	53	101	.261	25
Thomas Field, 2B	14	41	6	8	1	0	2	5	2	6	.195	1
Prince Fielder, DH, 1B	158	613	78	187	28	0	23	98	64	88	.305	0
Yovani Gallardo, P	33	4	0	2	1	0	0	0	0	1	.500	0
Joey Gallo, 3B, LF	36	108	16	22	3	1	6	14	15	57	.204	3
Chris Gimenez, C	36	98	19	25	6	1	5	14	10	19	.255	2
Cole Hamels, P	12	3	0	1	0	0	0	0	0	2	.333	0
Josh Hamilton, LF	50	170	22	43	8	0	8	25	10	52	.253	0
Matt Harrison, P	3	2	0	0	0	0	0	0	0	1	.000	0
Colby Lewis, P	33	2	0	0	0	0	0	0	0	0	.000	0
Leonys Martín, CF	95	288	26	63	12	0	5	25	16	69	.219	14
Nick Martinez, P	24	4	2	0	0	0	0	0	0	1	.000	0
Mitch Moreland, 1B, DH	132	471	51	131	27	0	23	85	32	112	.278	1
Mike Napoli, 1B, DH	35	78	9	23	2	0	5	10	12	19	.295	0
Rougned Odor, 2B	120	426	54	111	21	9	16	61	23	79	.261	6
Carlos Peguero, LF	30	70	10	13	4	0	4	9	12	36	.186	2
Martín Pérez, P	14	2	0	0	0	0	0	0	0	2	.000	0
Anthony Ranaudo, P	4	2	0	0	0	0	0	0	0	2	.000	0
Wandy Rodríguez, P	17	2	1	1	0	0	0	0	0	0	.000	0
Adam Rosales, 1B, 2B, 3B	55	114	14	26	4	0	3	7	10	30	.228	4
Ryan Rua, LF	28	83	10	16	5	0	4	7	3	32	.193	0
Jake Smolinski, OF	35	60	12	8	1	0	1	6	11	20	.133	1
Ryan Strausborger, OF	31	45	9	9	0	0	1	3	3	11	.200	2
Drew Stubbs, OF	27	21	6	2	1	0	0	0	5	10	.095	3
Tomás Telis, C	6	11	1	2	0	0	0	2	0	1	.182	0
Will Venable, LF	37	66	6	12	3	0	0	3	12	21	.182	5
Bobby Wilson, C	31	77	5	17	5	0	1	10	7	19	.221	0
Team totals	162	5511	751	1419	279	32	172	707	503	1233	.257	101

=== Pitching ===
Note: W = Wins; L = Losses; ERA = Earned run average; G = Games pitched; GS = Games started; SV = Saves; IP = Innings pitched; H = Hits allowed; R = Runs allowed; ER = Earned runs allowed; HR = Home runs allowed; BB = Walks allowed; K = Strikeouts

Player	W	L	ERA	G	GS	SV	IP	H	R	ER	HR	BB	K
Anthony Bass	0	0	4.50	33	0	0	64.0	66	33	32	5	20	45
Alex Claudio	1	1	2.87	18	0	0	15.2	12	6	5	4	6	13
Ross Detwiler	0	5	7.12	17	7	0	43.0	62	37	34	9	20	28
Jake Diekman	0	0	2.08	26	0	0	21.2	13	5	5	2	7	20
Sam Dyson	2	1	1.15	31	0	2	31.1	24	4	4	1	4	30
Jon Edwards	0	0	6.00	11	0	0	6.0	6	4	4	1	8	6
Neftalí Feliz	1	2	4.58	18	0	6	19.2	24	10	10	2	9	16
Sam Freeman	0	0	2.79	42	0	0	29.0	23	9	9	2	17	28
Kyuji Fujikawa	0	0	16.20	2	0	0	1.2	2	3	3	1	0	1
Yovani Gallardo	13	11	3.42	33	33	0	184.1	193	76	70	15	68	121
Chi Chi Gonzalez	4	6	3.90	14	10	0	67.0	49	29	29	6	32	30
Cole Hamels	7	1	3.66	12	12	0	83.2	77	34	34	10	23	78
Matt Harrison	1	2	6.75	3	3	0	16.0	19	12	12	3	6	5
Derek Holland	4	3	4.91	10	10	0	58.2	59	32	32	11	17	41
Keone Kela	7	5	2.39	68	0	1	60.1	52	18	16	4	18	68
Phil Klein	1	0	6.75	11	2	0	17.1	23	15	13	4	10	12
Colby Lewis	17	9	4.66	33	33	0	204.2	211	111	106	26	42	142
Nick Martinez	7	7	3.96	24	21	0	125.0	135	66	55	16	46	77
Román Méndez	0	1	5.40	12	0	0	11.2	11	7	7	1	7	9
Ross Ohlendorf	3	1	3.72	21	0	1	19.1	21	8	8	4	7	19
Spencer Patton	1	1	9.00	27	0	0	24.0	24	24	24	5	12	28
Martín Pérez	3	6	4.46	14	14	0	78.2	88	41	39	3	24	48
Stolmy Pimentel	0	1	3.97	8	0	0	11.1	11	5	5	1	3	7
Anthony Ranaudo	0	1	7.63	4	2	0	15.1	18	13	13	2	8	11
Wandy Rodríguez	6	4	4.90	17	15	0	86.1	99	48	47	10	36	72
Adam Rosales	0	0	9.00	2	0	0	2.0	2	3	2	2	1	1
Tanner Scheppers	4	1	5.63	42	0	0	38.1	37	25	24	6	23	32
Shawn Tolleson	6	4	2.99	73	0	35	72.1	66	24	24	9	17	76
Logan Verrett	0	1	6.00	4	0	0	9.0	11	7	6	1	4	3
Team totals	88	74	4.24	162	162	45	1442.2	1459	733	680	171	508	1095

== Farm system ==
Level	Team	League	Manager
AAA	Round Rock Express	Pacific Coast League	Jason Wood
AA	Frisco RoughRiders	Texas League	Joe Mikulik
A-Advanced	High Desert Mavericks	California League	Spike Owen
A	Hickory Crawdads	South Atlantic League	Corey Ragsdale
A-Short Season	Spokane Indians	Northwest League	Tim Hulett
Rookie	AZL Rangers	Arizona League	Kenny Holmberg
Rookie	DSL Rangers	Dominican Summer League	Aaron Levin

LEAGUE CHAMPIONS: Hickory
