= Ross Detwiler =

American baseball player (born 1986)

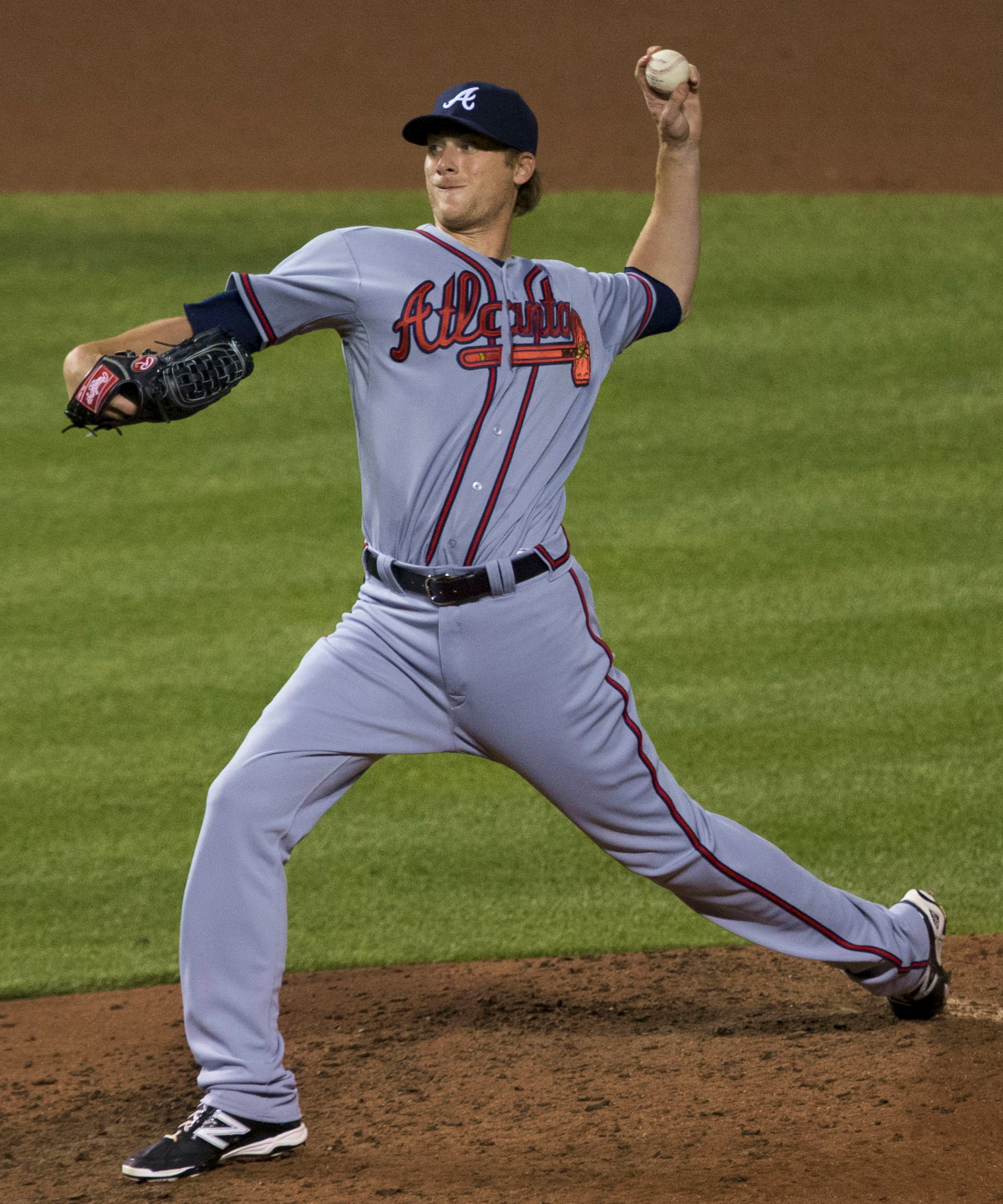
- Detwiler with the Atlanta Braves
- Pitcher
- Born: March 6, 1986 (age 40); St. Louis, Missouri, U.S.
- Batted: Right Threw: Left

MLB debut
- September 7, 2007, for the Washington Nationals

Last MLB appearance
- August 29, 2022, for the Cincinnati Reds

MLB statistics
- Win–loss record: 30–51
- Earned run average: 4.56
- Strikeouts: 505
- Stats at Baseball Reference

Teams
- Washington Nationals (2007, 2009–2014); Texas Rangers (2015); Atlanta Braves (2015); Cleveland Indians (2016); Oakland Athletics (2016); Seattle Mariners (2018); Chicago White Sox (2019–2020); Miami Marlins (2021); San Diego Padres (2021); Cincinnati Reds (2022)
Medals
Men's baseball
Representing United States
World University Championship
| Gold medal – first place | 2006 Havana | National team |

Ross Emery Detwiler (born March 6, 1986) is an American former professional baseball pitcher who currently serves as a minor league pitching instructor in the Baltimore Orioles organization. He was drafted by the Washington Nationals in the first round of the 2007 MLB draft and made his MLB debut late that season. He also played in MLB for the Texas Rangers, Atlanta Braves, Cleveland Indians, Oakland Athletics, Seattle Mariners, Chicago White Sox, Miami Marlins, San Diego Padres, and Cincinnati Reds.

== Playing career ==
=== High school ===
Ross Detwiler grew up in Wentzville, Missouri, and graduated from Wentzville Holt High School in 2004. As a senior, Detwiler helped lead Holt to its first district title in 14 years.

=== College baseball ===
In college, Detwiler pitched for Missouri State University of the Missouri Valley Conference. In 2006, he was a member of the All-MVC Tournament team, and he also pitched 10 1/3 innings in two starts for the Falmouth Commodores of the Cape Cod League, accruing a 1.74 ERA, striking out 14 batters, and issuing three walks before moving on to play for Team USA. In 2007, he finished his third year with a 2.22 ERA in 14 starts and 100 strikeouts in 89 innings.

During the summer of his freshman year in college Detwiler played for Wentzville Legion Post 323.

=== Washington Nationals ===
The Washington Nationals drafted him in the first round (sixth overall) in the 2007 MLB draft, making him the highest Missouri State draft pick in history. Detwiler was the fifth pitcher taken by the Washington Nationals/Montreal Expos franchise in the first round of the draft in the last six years following Clint Everts, Chad Cordero and Bill Bray in 2002, 2003 and 2004, respectively, and Colton Willems taken in 2006.

After being drafted and signed by the Nationals, he pitched four games in the rookie Gulf Coast League, and then five games with the high A Potomac Nationals. On September 7, 2007, he made his MLB debut, pitching one hitless inning in relief against the Atlanta Braves, striking out one. He became the first player drafted in the 2007 Draft to appear in a major-league game. He joined Cordero and Ryan Zimmerman as the third member of the Nationals franchise to be called up to the major leagues in the same year that he was drafted.

Detwiler opened the 2009 season with the Harrisburg Senators of the Class AA Eastern League. However, due to the injury of Scott Olsen, he was called up to start on May 18 against the Pirates. He went 5 innings and allowed 3 runs, striking out 6. Although he was 1–6 with a 5.00 ERA in 15 games with the Nationals in 2009, he went 1–1 with a 2.08 ERA in four September starts.

On February 18, 2010, Detwiler underwent hip surgery due to a labral tear.

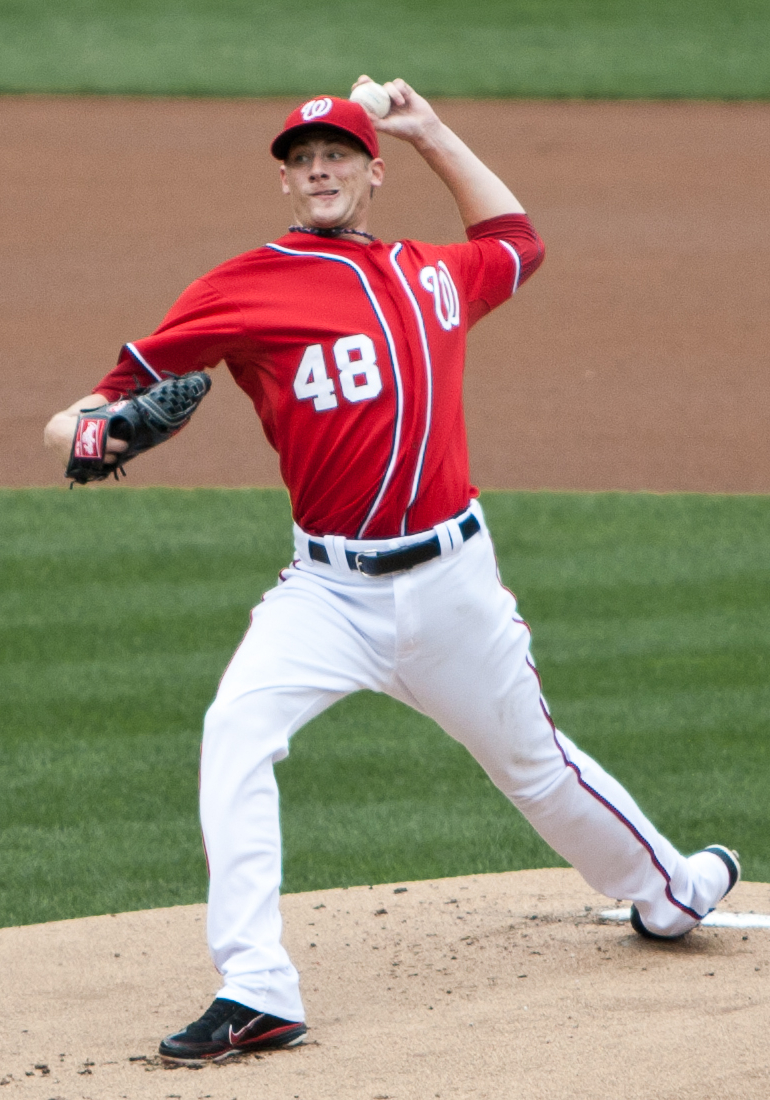
Detwiler pitching for the Washington Nationals in 2011

Detwiler made his return to MLB play in July 2011 after recovering from hip surgery, and he remained in rotation for the remainder of the 2011 season. Detwiler finished the 2011 season with a 4–5 win loss record and a 3.00 ERA.

Detwiler was named to the starting rotation for the 2012 season. Although he pitched effectively, the return of Chien-Ming Wang from injury put Detwiler in the long relief role in late May. Wang struggled in the rotation, granting Detwiler a return to the rotation a few weeks later. He was a regular starter for the rest of the year, finishing with 27 starts, plus a six-inning start, in which he allowed one unearned run, in game 4 of the 2012 NLDS.

Detwiler missed significant time in 2013 with an oblique injury and a pinched nerve in his back. He finished the year with just 71 1/3 innings pitched and a 4.04 ERA.

Detwiler competed in the 2013 World Baseball Classic for Team USA. He pitched four scoreless innings in relief and collected a save.

Detwiler started the 2014 season in a long relief role.

=== Texas Rangers ===
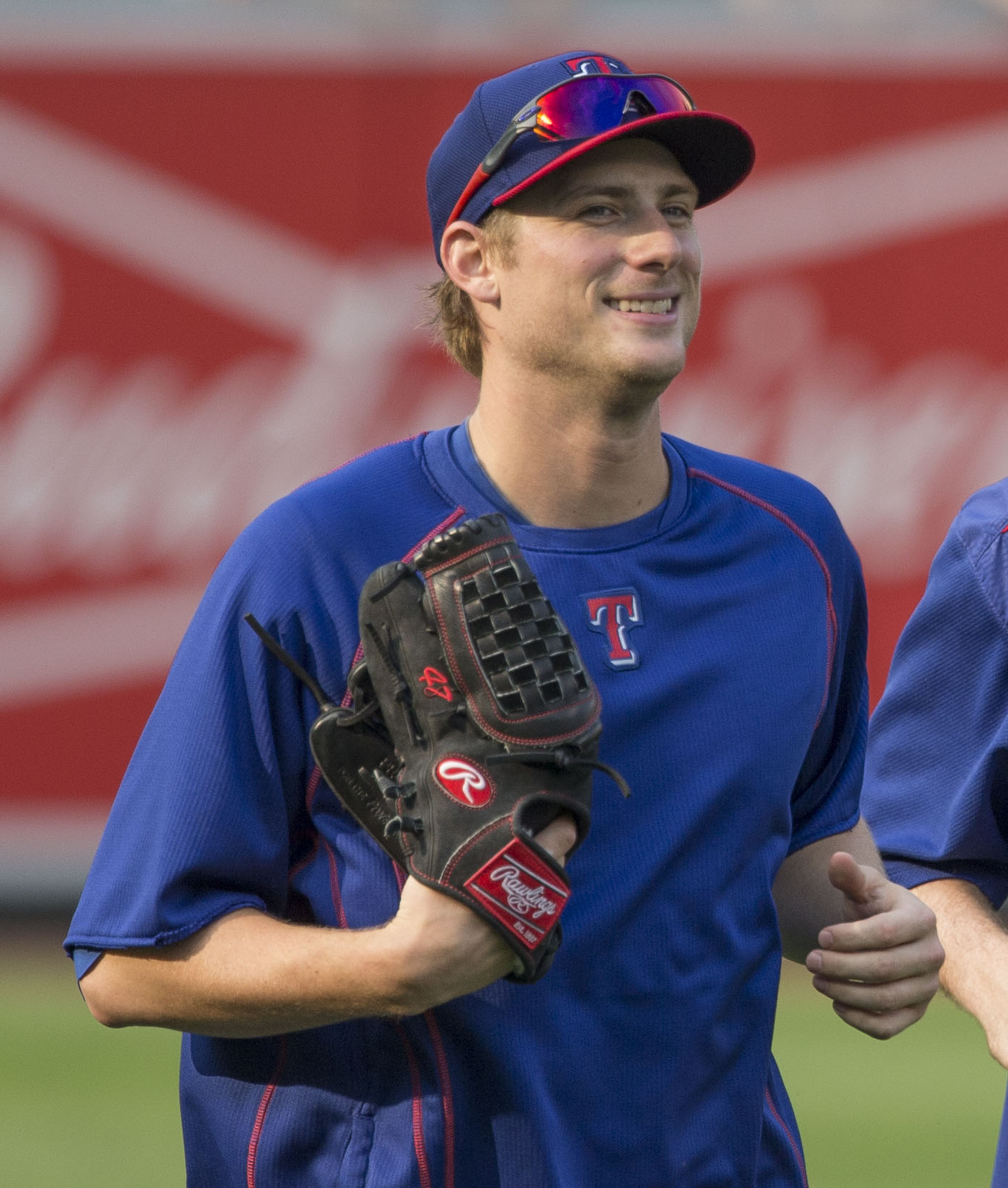
Detwiler during his tenure with the Texas Rangers in 2015

On December 12, 2014, the Nationals traded Detwiler to the Texas Rangers for Chris Bostick and Abel De Los Santos. He began the 2015 season as a starter but recorded an 0–5 record and a 6.95 ERA, before being placed on the disabled list on May 15 due to shoulder inflammation. Upon his return to the active roster, Detwiler made ten appearances out of the bullpen, and saw his ERA climb to 7.12. He was designated for assignment on July 11, 2015. He was released on July 15.

=== Atlanta Braves ===
On July 17, 2015, Detwiler signed with the Atlanta Braves. In 2015 between the two teams he was 1–5 with a 7.25 ERA. Right-handed batters had a higher batting average against him, .381, than against all other MLB pitchers in 30 or more innings.

=== Cleveland Indians ===
On December 22, 2015, Detwiler signed a minor league contract with the Cleveland Indians. The Indians purchased his contract on April 3, 2016. He was 0–0 with a 5.79 ERA. He was designated for assignment on April 29.

=== Oakland Athletics ===
On July 17, 2016, Detwiler was traded to the Oakland Athletics in exchange for cash considerations, and was assigned to the Triple-A Nashville Sounds. He was called up to start against the Baltimore Orioles on August 10, and threw eight shutout innings for the 1–0 win. Detwiler would finish his season 2–4 with an ERA of 6.14. On January 18, 2017, Detwiler signed a minor league contract with the Athletics that included an invitation to spring training. He was assigned to Triple-A to begin the 2017 season, but instead opted out of his contract and elected to become a free agent before the season's start. He re-signed a minor league contract a few days later and was assigned to Triple-A Nashville. Detwiler opted out of this contract on May 14, once again becoming a free agent, after having appeared in 14 games with Nashville.

=== Chicago Cubs ===
On June 6, 2017, Detwiler signed a minor league deal with the Chicago Cubs. He appeared in five games for the Triple-A Iowa Cubs before being released on July 17.

=== York Revolution ===
On March 14, 2018, Detwiler signed with the York Revolution of the independent Atlantic League of Professional Baseball. Detwiler began the year with the York Revolution, where he went 3–1 with a 2.70 ERA over 30 innings.

=== Seattle Mariners ===
The Seattle Mariners purchased his contract on June 1, 2018, and assigned him to the Triple-A Tacoma Rainiers. On August 21, Detwiler was called up to the Mariners' roster after going 2–5 with a 5.15 ERA in 14 games for Tacoma. He took the mound in relief that night, giving up three runs in six innings to the defending World Series Champion Houston Astros. Although he took the loss, he helped the Mariners set a record with six double plays. The following day, he was designated for assignment. Detwiler elected free agency on October 5, 2018.

=== York Revolution (second stint) ===
On March 26, 2019, Detwiler signed with the York Revolution of the Atlantic League of Professional Baseball.

=== Chicago White Sox ===
On May 9, 2019, Detwiler's contract was purchased by the Chicago White Sox and he was assigned to the Triple-A Charlotte Knights. On June 28, the White Sox selected his contract. He remained with the team for the remainder of the season, pitching to a career worst 6.59 ERA in 18 games (12 starts). Detwiler became a free agent following the season, but later re-signed with the White Sox to a minor league deal. With the 2020 Chicago White Sox, Detwiler appeared in 16 games, compiling a 1–1 record with 3.20 ERA and 15 strikeouts in 19.2 innings pitched. Detwiler was designated for the assignment by the White Sox on September 24. He elected free agency on September 28.

=== Miami Marlins ===
On January 1, 2021, Detwiler signed a one-year, $850K major league contract with the Miami Marlins. Detwiler made 46 appearances for the Marlins, going 2–1 with a 4.96 ERA and 56 strikeouts. On September 7, 2021, Detwiler was designated for assignment by the Marlins. On September 12, the Marlins released Detwiler.

=== San Diego Padres ===
On September 14, 2021, Detwiler signed a major league contract with the San Diego Padres. Detwiler appeared in seven games for San Diego, posting a 2.57 ERA with six strikeouts in seven innings pitched. He became a free agent following the 2021 season.

=== Cincinnati Reds ===
On April 7, 2022, Detwiler signed a minor league contract with the Cincinnati Reds organization. He was assigned to the Triple-A Louisville Bats to begin the year, where he posted a 3.86 ERA and 1.57 WHIP in 7.0 innings across 7 appearances. On May 14, Detwiler was selected to the active roster.

On August 29, Detwiler became the 450th unique pitcher to surrender a home run to Albert Pujols, breaking the record previously set by Barry Bonds. On August 30, Detwiler was designated for assignment and elected free agency the next day.

== Coaching career ==
On July 7, 2026, the Baltimore Orioles hired Detwiler to serve as a roving minor league pitching instructor after Thomas Eshelman departed the organization.

== Pitching style ==
Detwiler is a sinkerballer, throwing his sinker at 90–94 mph. His other pitches are a four-seam fastball (91–95), a curveball (78–81), and a changeup (84–87). Detwiler does not usually throw the changeup to left-handed hitters or in two-strike counts.

== Personal life ==
Detwiler has two brothers. He was a hospitality and restaurant administration major in college. As St. Louis natives, Detwiler and his family were avid fans of the Cardinals, Blues, and the now re-located Rams.
