= Carson Smith (baseball) =

American baseball player (born 1989)

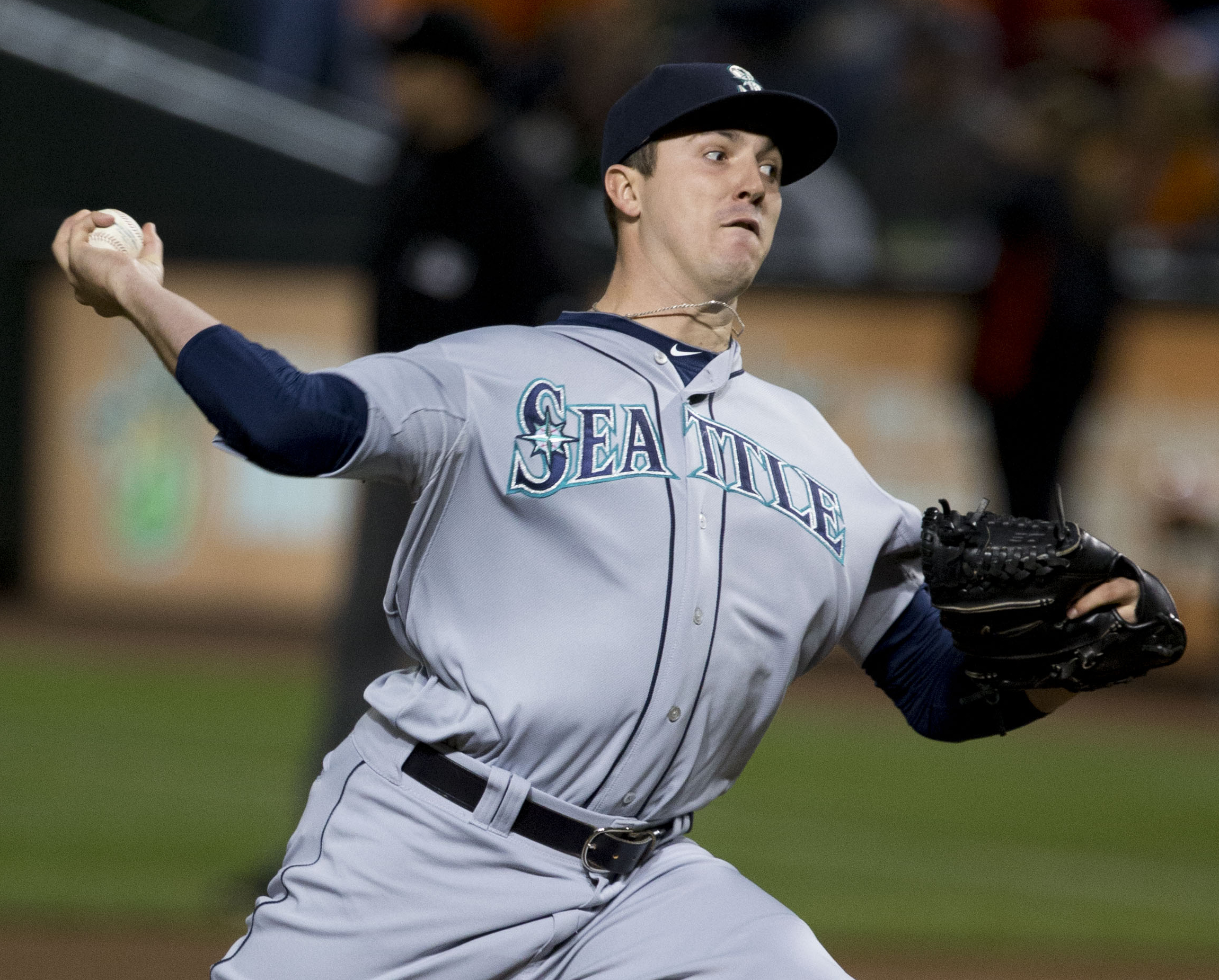
- Smith with the Seattle Mariners
- Pitcher
- Born: October 19, 1989 (age 36); Midland, Texas, U.S.
- Batted: Right Threw: Right

MLB debut
- September 1, 2014, for the Seattle Mariners

Last MLB appearance
- May 14, 2018, for the Boston Red Sox

MLB statistics
- Win–loss record: 4–6
- Earned run average: 2.21
- Strikeouts: 129
- Stats at Baseball Reference

Teams
- Seattle Mariners (2014–2015); Boston Red Sox (2016–2018)

Carson Donald Smith (born October 19, 1989) is an American former professional baseball pitcher. He played in Major League Baseball (MLB) for the Seattle Mariners and Boston Red Sox. Listed at 6 feet 6 inches (198 cm) and 215 pounds (98 kg), he both bats and throws right-handed.

== Amateur career ==
Smith attended Midland Christian High School in Midland, Texas. He then enrolled at Grayson County College, where he began his college baseball career. After Smith's freshman year, he transferred to Texas State University, where he played for the Texas State Bobcats baseball team. He was named Southland Conference Pitcher of the Year as a sophomore and a junior, and a second team All-American by Louisville Slugger as a junior.

== Professional career ==
=== Seattle Mariners (2011–2015) ===
==== Minor leagues ====
The Seattle Mariners drafted Smith in the eighth round, with the 243rd overall selection of the 2011 Major League Baseball draft, with the 243rd overall pick. Smith pitched for the High Desert Mavericks of the High-A California League in 2012, and the Jackson Generals of the Double-A Southern League in 2013. After the 2013 season, the Mariners assigned Smith to the Arizona Fall League, and he was named to appear in the Fall Stars Game. In 2014, Smith pitched for the Tacoma Rainiers of the Triple-A Pacific Coast League.

==== Major leagues ====
The Mariners promoted Smith to the major leagues on September 1, 2014. He faced one batter, retiring Josh Donaldson of the Oakland Athletics on a ground out. Smith made nine appearances for the Mariners as a September call-up; he did not allow a run in 8 1/3 innings pitched, while recording ten strikeouts and issuing three walks.

Pitching for Seattle in 2015, Smith did not allow a run in his first 11 appearances of the season. This set a Mariners' record of 20 pitching appearances without allowing a run to start his MLB career. Smith finally allowed a run on May 3, his 21st MLB appearance, giving up a solo home run to Evan Gattis of the Houston Astros. Smith became the Mariners' closer in June due to Fernando Rodney's struggles during the season. For the season, Smith appeared in 70 Mariners games, with a 2.31 earned run average (ERA) 13 saves, 92 strikeouts and 22 walks in 70 innings pitched.

=== Boston Red Sox (2016–2018) ===
On December 7, 2015, the Mariners traded Smith and Roenis Elías to the Boston Red Sox for Wade Miley and Jonathan Aro.

On March 22, 2016, while pitching in spring training against the Miami Marlins, Smith was removed from the game after throwing five pitches during the 7th inning due to tightness in his right forearm. He was diagnosed with a flexor mass muscle strain after undergoing an MRI. Smith made three appearances for the Red Sox during the regular season, pitching 2 2/3 scoreless innings in May while striking out two and walking one before landing back on the disabled list on May 20 with an elbow injury. He then underwent Tommy John surgery, ending his season. His return was not expected until June 2017.

After more than a year recovering from surgery, Smith was sent on rehabilitation assignments in August 2017 with the Double-A Portland Sea Dogs and Triple-A Pawtucket Red Sox. He was then activated from the 60-day disabled list on September 5. He pitched in eight regular season games for Boston in September, allowing one run in 6 2/3 innings pitched (1.35 ERA) while striking out seven and walking two. On September 18, Smith picked up his only save with the Red Sox during an extra-inning victory over the Baltimore Orioles.

Smith was included on Boston's postseason roster for the 2017 American League Division Series. He made two appearances during the series, pitching 1 1/3 innings of scoreless relief, striking out one and walking two, as Boston lost to the eventual World Series champions, the Astros.

On May 15, 2018, Smith was placed on the 10-day disabled list with a right shoulder subluxation. The injury occurred when Smith, in reaction to allowing a home run to Khris Davis of the Oakland Athletics in the prior day's game, threw his glove in the dugout out of frustration. Prior to being placed on the disabled list, Smith had made 18 appearances with a 1–1 record and 3.77 ERA. On June 12, it was revealed that Smith would require surgery for his shoulder injury, ending his season. The procedure was performed on June 13. The Red Sox outrighted him to the minors on November 1, 2018, and he chose to become a free agent.

On December 20, 2018, Smith re-signed to a minor league deal with the Red Sox. He began with 2019 season on the injured list of Triple-A Pawtucket. Smith was released on June 17, without appearing in a game due to his ongoing recovery from shoulder surgery.
