= Shawn Tolleson =

American baseball player (born 1988)

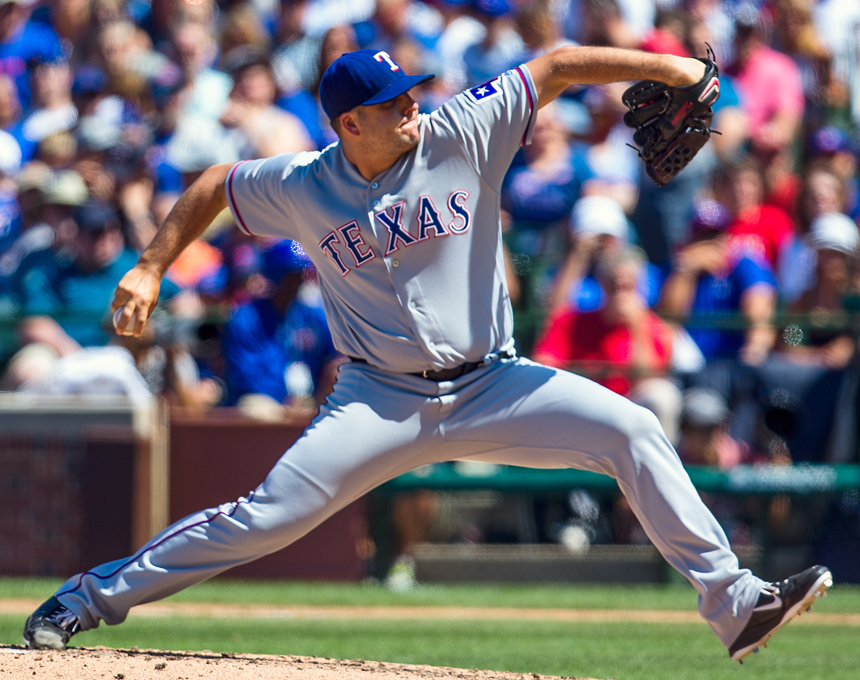
- Tolleson pitching for the Texas Rangers in 2016
- Pitcher
- Born: January 19, 1988 (age 38); Dallas, Texas, U.S.
- Batted: Right Threw: Right

MLB debut
- June 7, 2012, for the Los Angeles Dodgers

Last MLB appearance
- July 27, 2016, for the Texas Rangers

MLB statistics
- Win–loss record: 14–8
- Earned run average: 3.92
- Strikeouts: 213
- Saves: 46
- Stats at Baseball Reference

Teams
- Los Angeles Dodgers (2012–2013); Texas Rangers (2014–2016)

Shawn Mark Tolleson (born January 19, 1988) is an American former professional baseball relief pitcher. He played in Major League Baseball (MLB) for the Los Angeles Dodgers and Texas Rangers.

== High school and college ==
Tolleson played high school baseball at Allen High School in Allen, Texas. A four-year letter winner for head coach Paul Pool, he led Allen to regional quarterfinals as a sophomore and the regional semifinals as a junior. Both seasons, Tolleson was chosen THSCA All-State, 1st-Team All-District and All-Area. He posted a mark of 9–2 with a 0.42 ERA and 137 strikeouts in 89 innings as a sophomore and went 7–4 with 0.89 ERA and 112 strikeouts in 80 innings as a junior for the co-District Champion Allen Eagles. Tolleson entered his senior season as a First-team 2006 preseason All-America pick by Collegiate Baseball, but missed most of that senior season due to Tommy John surgery.

While at Baylor, Tolleson compiled a 9–13 record in 2008-2010 after being redshirted as a freshman in 2007. He saw his most success as a freshman, going 6–4 in 14 starts and having a team-high two shutouts. Tolleson was named an honorable mention All-Big 12 selection in 2008 and 2010; he was also awarded Big 12 Pitcher of the Week honors twice in his college career. In 2008, he played collegiate summer baseball in the Cape Cod Baseball League for the Yarmouth-Dennis Red Sox, and returned to the league in 2009 with the Chatham Anglers.

== Professional career ==
=== Los Angeles Dodgers ===
Tolleson was drafted by the Los Angeles Dodgers in the 30th round of the 2010 MLB draft out of Baylor University. In 2010 with the Ogden Raptors, he had 17 saves in 25 appearances and a 0.63 ERA. Tolleson was selected to the Pioneer Baseball League post-season all-star team. In 2011, he appeared in 14 games with the Great Lakes Loons, five with the Rancho Cucamonga Quakes and 38 with the AA Chattanooga Lookouts. Tolleson was the primary closer at each level, working in 57 total games with a 7–2 record, 1.17 ERA and 25 saves. He was the Dodgers' Minor League Pitcher of the Year in 2011. After beginning 2012 with Chattanooga, he was promoted to the AAA Albuquerque Isotopes on May 11.

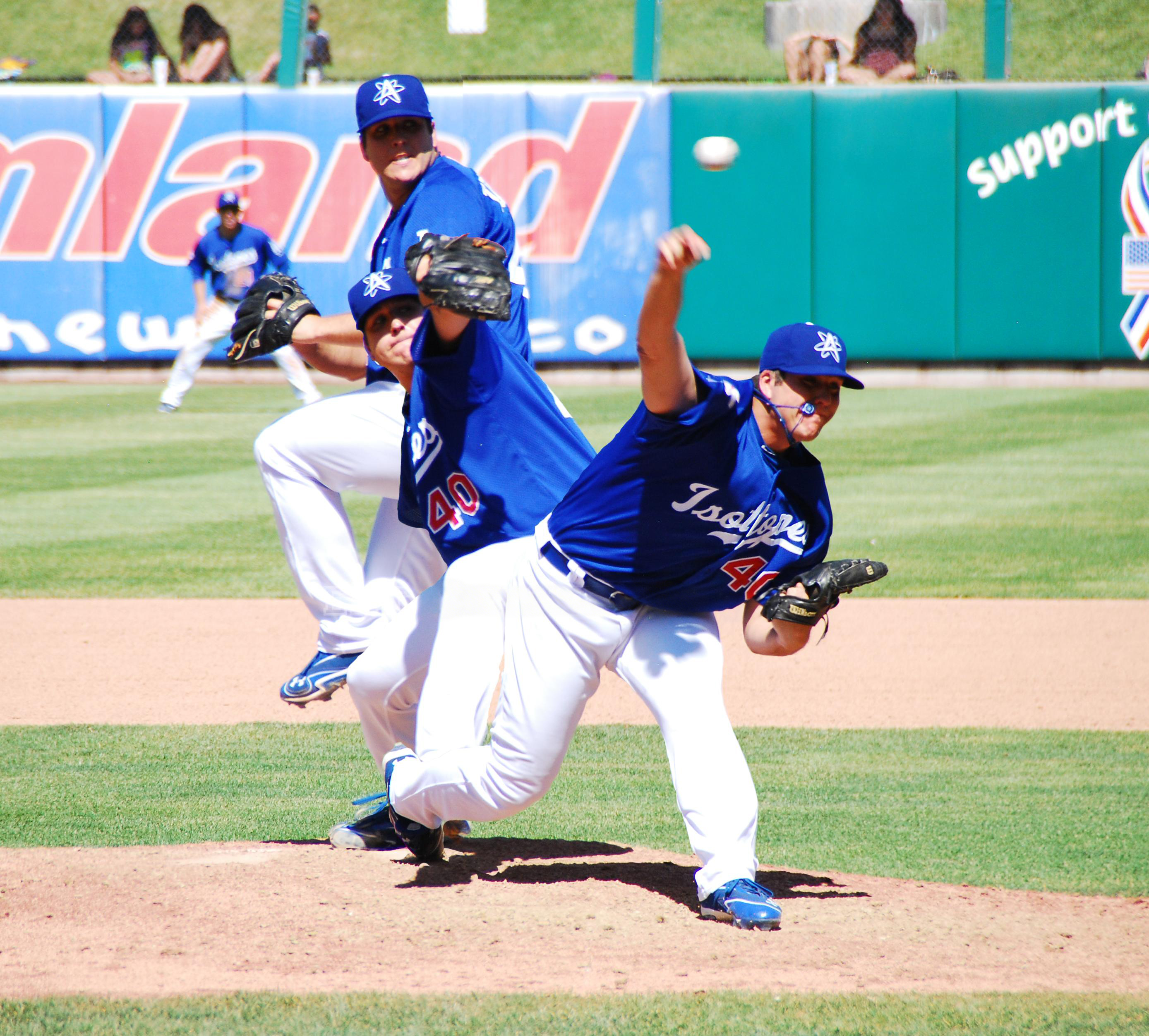
Tolleson pitching for the Albuquerque Isotopes, triple-A affiliates of the Los Angeles Dodgers, in 2012

Tolleson was called up to the majors for the first time on June 4, 2012. He made his Major League debut on June 7 against the Philadelphia Phillies. Tolleson walked the two batters he faced, throwing eight balls in 10 pitches, and was quickly taken out of the game. He fared better in his second appearance, on June 10 against the Seattle Mariners, working one inning and picking up his first two strikeouts. During the 2012 season, Tolleson appeared in 40 games for the Dodgers with an ERA of 4.30 and a 3-1 record.

Tolleson began the 2013 season in Albuquerque, where he pitched 5.2 innings in three games, with two saves, and did not allow any runs. He was called up to the Dodgers on April 12 and pitched that day, walking the only two batters he faced. Tolleson was placed on the disabled list after the game and underwent surgery on April 25 to repair a herniated disc in his back. His return from the injury was hampered when he suffered a hip injury during his minor league rehab in August. Tolleson was then shut down for the season.

=== Texas Rangers ===
On November 20, 2013, Tolleson was claimed off waivers by the Texas Rangers. He became the Rangers' closer in 2015. Tolleson recorded his first career save on May 20, 2015, against Boston in a 2-1 victory after Neftali Feliz was waived after not performing well enough in the closer role. He finished the season with a 6-4 record, 2.99 ERA, a 1.15 WHIP, 35 saves and 76 strikeouts. On May 18, 2016, Tolleson was removed as closer by the Rangers after owning an ERA over 9 despite recording 11 saves.

On October 27, 2016, Tolleson rejected an outright assignment and became a free agent.

=== Tampa Bay Rays ===
On January 23, 2017, Tolleson signed a one-year, $1 million contract with the Tampa Bay Rays. He was outrighted to Triple-A on November 6, 2017, and later elected free agency.

=== Texas Rangers (second stint) ===
On December 22, 2017, Tolleson signed a minor league contract with the Texas Rangers.

After experiencing a setback in his rehab from Tommy John surgery, Tolleson announced his retirement on January 16, 2019.
