= Rob Rasmussen =

American baseball player (born 1989)

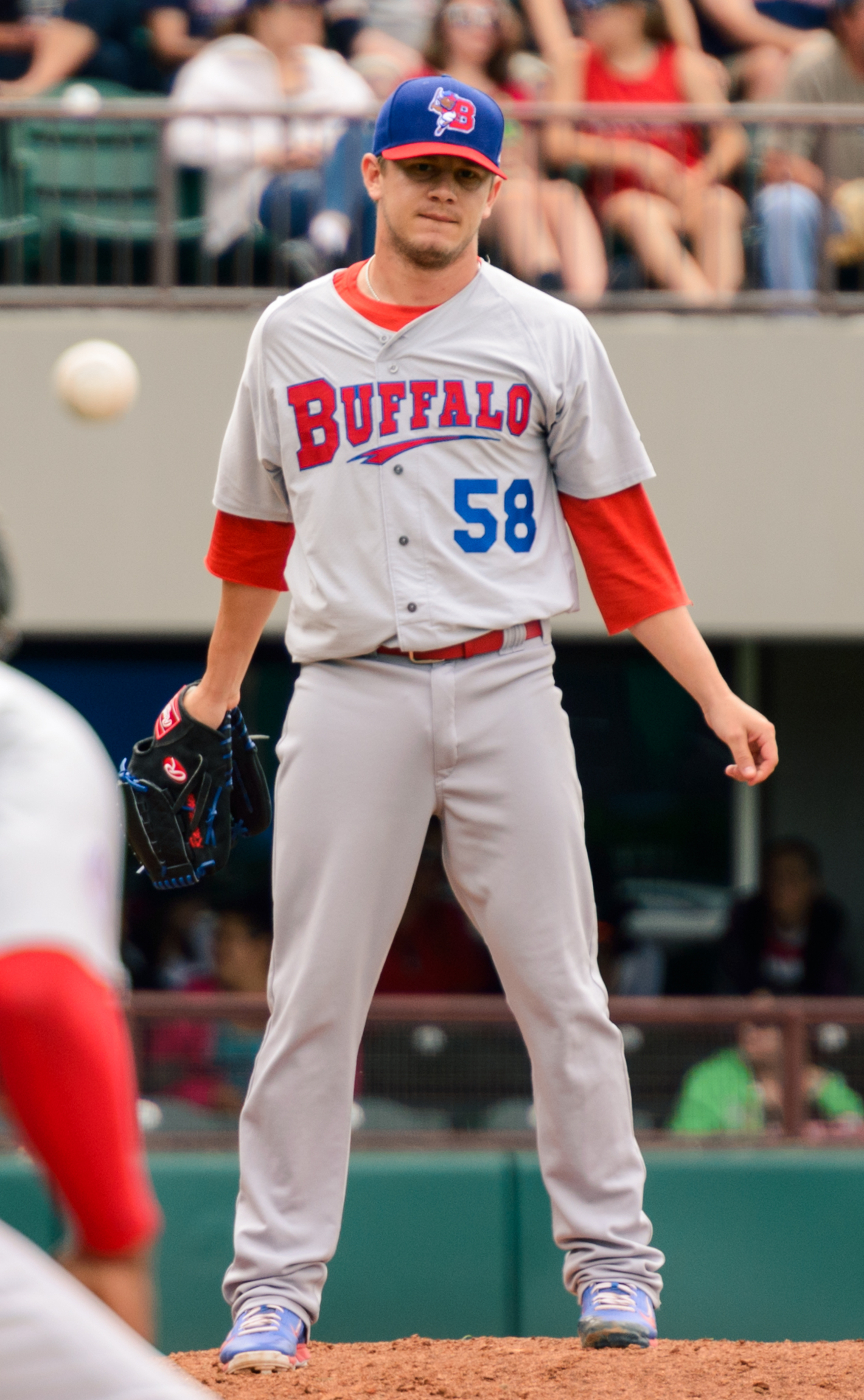
- Rasmussen with the Buffalo Bisons
- Pitcher
- Born: April 2, 1989 (age 37); Pasadena, California, U.S.
- Batted: Right Threw: Left

MLB debut
- May 20, 2014, for the Toronto Blue Jays

Last MLB appearance
- September 30, 2015, for the Seattle Mariners

Career statistics
- Win–loss record: 2–1
- Earned run average: 7.09
- Strikeouts: 30
- Stats at Baseball Reference

Teams
- Toronto Blue Jays (2014–2015); Seattle Mariners (2015)

Robert Paul Rasmussen (born April 2, 1989) is an American former professional baseball pitcher. He played in Major League Baseball (MLB) for the Toronto Blue Jays and the Seattle Mariners. Prior to his professional career, Rasmussen attended the University of California, Los Angeles (UCLA) and played college baseball for the UCLA Bruins.

== Early life ==
Rasmussen is a native of Arcadia, California. He attended Clairbourn School and then Polytechnic School in Pasadena, California. He established himself as an elite high school prospect despite attending a small high school with only 360 students. As a four-year starter for the varsity baseball team at Polytechnic, Rasmussen compiled a 38–2 record and 1.04 ERA, recording 492 strikeouts in 248 2/3 innings over his career. Rasmussen earned further attention from professional and collegiate baseball scouts while playing in the Babe Ruth League between high school seasons, pitching for three Babe Ruth World Series championship teams and posting a 17–0 record.

== Collegiate career ==
After being selected in the 27th round of the 2007 MLB draft by the Los Angeles Dodgers, Rasmussen decided to attend the University of California, Los Angeles (UCLA) to play college baseball for the UCLA Bruins. In his first season at UCLA, Rasmussen made only 10 appearances and 2 starts after sustaining a broken left foot off a line drive comebacker in the third inning of his 2008 collegiate debut against UC Santa Barbara. After recovering from his injury at the end of the 2008 season, Rasmussen finished with a 5.60 ERA and 0-2 record in 17 2/3 innings. Rasmussen started for UCLA in the NCAA Regional Final against Cal State Fullerton.

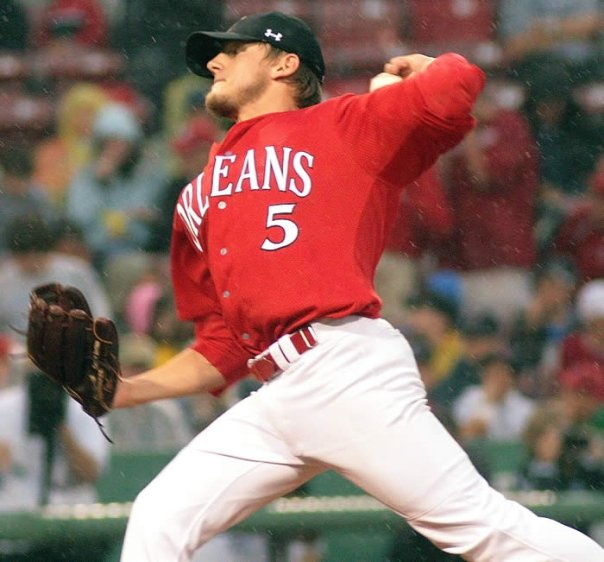
Rasmussen at the 2009 Cape Cod All Star Game

During the summers of 2008 and 2009, Rasmussen pitched for the Orleans Firebirds of the Cape Cod Baseball League. After going 2-0 with a 0.96 ERA in his first three starts for the Orleans Firebirds in the summer of 2009, Rasmussen was selected to start on the mound in the Cape Cod League All-Star game at Fenway Park on July 23, 2009. He finished the Cape Cod season going 4-0 with a 1.80 ERA.

During the 2009 season, Rasmussen made 18 appearances, posted a record of 4-2 with a 6.75 ERA, while totaling 51 strikeouts and 26 walks in 44 2/3 innings. Rasmussen earned a victory in the Bruins' season-opener, a 13-1 win against UC Davis.

Rasmussen earned a no-decision for his start in the ongoing 2010 season opener for the Bruins, striking out six batters and giving up just one earned run in 4 2/3 innings against rival Southern Cal. On March 6, he earned a win against Nebraska in the finale of a 3-game series, recording 10 strikeouts in five innings as the Bruins starter, limiting the Huskers to one unearned run and three hits. On April 3, Rasmussen earned his fourth win against Stanford, going 6 innings and bringing his record to 4-0 on the season.

His Sunday pitching contributed in making the 2010 team the best UCLA baseball team (51-17 record) in school history and the second best team in the country. The team went on to play in the 2010 College World Series and was defeated by South Carolina in the NCAA Championship Series. Rasmussen went 11-3 with a 2.72 ERA, collecting 128 strikeouts in 109 1/3 innings.

According to the Under Armour 2010 Draft Scouting Report: "Rasmussen is a pretty advanced college lefty with an interesting combination of pitchability and stuff. He has four pitches he's around the plate with, though he does need to be a little more efficient with his pitches. He's a bit undersized, which might concern some, but he does a nice job mixing his pitches and keeping hitters guessing. If the spike in velocity he showed early in the spring is still around all season, he could sneak even further up Draft boards."

== Professional career ==
=== Miami Marlins ===
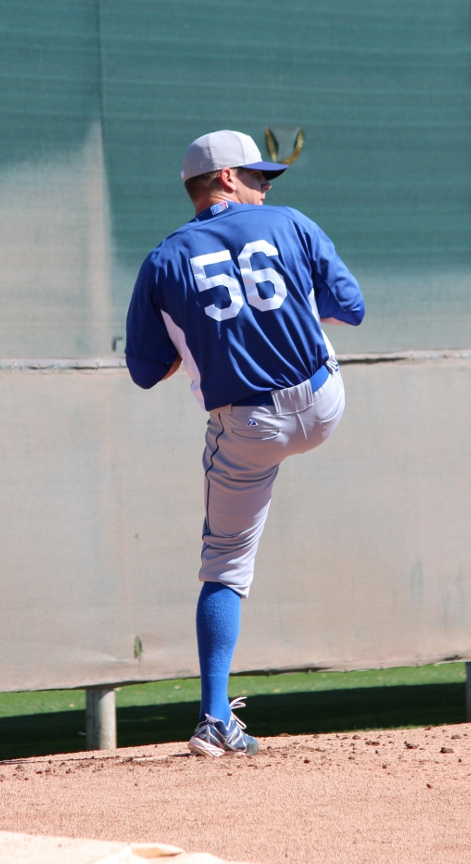
Rasmussen with the Los Angeles Dodgers in 2013 spring training

On June 8, 2010, Rasmussen was drafted by the Florida Marlins in the second round of the MLB draft. On July 7, 2010, he officially signed his first pro contract with the Marlins. He made his debut for Class-A Greensboro (South Atlantic League). He subsequently pitched for the High-A Jupiter Hammerheads in 2011, with a 12-10 record and 3.64 ERA in 27 starts and 1 relief appearance.

=== Houston Astros ===
On July 4, 2012, Rasmussen and Matt Dominguez were traded to the Houston Astros for Carlos Lee. He was sent to the Double-A Corpus Christi Hooks, where he made 10 starts.

=== Los Angeles Dodgers ===
On December 19, 2012, Rasmussen was traded to the Los Angeles Dodgers in exchange for John Ely. The Dodgers assigned him to the Chattanooga Lookouts for the 2013 season, where he made 11 starts and was 3-3 with a 2.42 ERA. He was selected to the Southern League All-Star team but was unable to play because he was promoted to the Triple-A Albuquerque Isotopes. He struggled with the Isotopes and was 0-7 with a 6.46 ERA, leading to a return to Chattanooga.

=== Philadelphia Phillies ===
Rasmussen was traded again, on August 31, 2013, to the Philadelphia Phillies, in exchange for Michael Young. The Phillies added Rasmussen to their 40-man roster on November 20, in order to protect him from the Rule 5 draft.

=== Toronto Blue Jays ===
On December 3, 2013, he was traded again, to the Toronto Blue Jays (along with Erik Kratz) for Brad Lincoln. On March 10, 2014, he was optioned to the Triple-A Buffalo Bisons. He was called up for his first trip to the major leagues on May 20 and made his debut that night, getting David Ortiz to groundout in a 7–4 win. Rasmussen recorded his first major league strikeout on May 26, against Logan Forsythe of the Tampa Bay Rays. He was optioned back to the Bisons on May 30, and recalled on June 21 to replace Liam Hendriks. Following the acquisition of Danny Valencia, Rasmussen was again optioned back to Triple-A Buffalo on July 29. On June 22, 2015, Rasmussen was recalled for the first time in the 2015 season. He was optioned back to Buffalo on June 26.

=== Seattle Mariners ===
On July 31, 2015, Rasmussen was traded with Nick Wells and Jake Brentz to the Seattle Mariners for Mark Lowe. He was designated for assignment by the Mariners on December 14, 2015.

=== Los Angeles Angels of Anaheim ===
On December 23, 2015, Rasmussen was claimed off waivers by the Los Angeles Angels of Anaheim. On March 15, 2016, it was reported that Rasmussen had decided to retire, and pursue a business degree.
