= 2015 Minnesota Twins season =

2015 Minnesota Twins
- League: American League
- Division: Central
- Ballpark: Target Field
- City: Minneapolis, Minnesota
- Record: 83–79 (.512)
- Divisional place: 2nd
- Owners: Jim Pohlad
- General managers: Terry Ryan
- Managers: Paul Molitor
- Television: Fox Sports North (Dick Bremer, Bert Blyleven, Jack Morris, Tim Laudner, Roy Smalley, Jamie Hersch, Marney Gellner, Kevin Gorg)
- Radio: KTWN-FM (Cory Provus, Dan Gladden, Kris Atteberry, Alfonso Fernandez, Tony Oliva)
- Stats: ESPN.com; Baseball Reference

The 2015 Minnesota Twins season was the 55th season for the franchise in the Twin Cities of Minnesota, their sixth season at Target Field and the 115th overall in the American League. The team finished second in the American League Central with an 83–79 record, their best overall result since the 2010 season, which was the last year they made the playoffs. The team remained in the running for a wild card berth in the American League playoffs until losing Game 161 (their second to last). They would eventually win a wild card berth two years later, in 2017. In between, however, the team lost 103 games.

After seven years away, outfielder Torii Hunter returned for his twelfth year as a Twin. Lauded rookies Eddie Rosario, Miguel Sano and Byron Buxton arrived from the minors; each tallied their first big-league hit, home run and run batted in. In Rosario's case, he did all three on May 6 on the first big-league pitch he saw, just the twenty-ninth player in history to do so. In May, the Twins had a month record of 20–7, which was the best month for the franchise since June 1991, the last year they won the World Series.

== Offseason ==
- October 30: Jared Burton becomes a free agent.
- Week of November 11: Signed 4 players to a minor league contract and invited 3 of them to spring training.
- November 20: Signed 3 players to a minor league contract (2 with a spring training invite) and promoted 4 players from the minors.
- November 25: Sent Anthony Swarzak to the minors.
- December 3: Signed Torii Hunter to a one-year, $10.5 million contract.
- December 5: Signed Shane Robinson to a minor league contract and invited him to spring training.
- December 11: Drafted J. R. Graham.
- December 13: Signed Ervin Santana and Carlos Paulino (minor league contract) while sending Chris Parmelee to the minors.
- Week of December 15: Signed 5 players to a minor league contract (1 with an invite to Spring training) and invited 11 others to spring training.
- December 23: Signed Tim Stauffer.
- December 31: Signed Blaine Boyer to a minor league contract and invited him to spring training.
- Week of January 7: Signed 3 players to a minor league contract.

== Season standings ==
=== American League Central ===
AL Central
Team	W	L	Pct.	GB	Home	Road
Kansas City Royals	95	67	.586	—	51‍–‍30	44‍–‍37
Minnesota Twins	83	79	.512	12	46‍–‍35	37‍–‍44
Cleveland Indians	81	80	.503	13½	39‍–‍41	42‍–‍39
Chicago White Sox	76	86	.469	19	40‍–‍41	36‍–‍45
Detroit Tigers	74	87	.460	20½	38‍–‍43	36‍–‍44

=== American League Wild Card ===
Division leaders
Team	W	L	Pct.
Kansas City Royals	95	67	.586
Toronto Blue Jays	93	69	.574
Texas Rangers	88	74	.543

Wild Card teams (Top 2 teams qualify for postseason)
Team	W	L	Pct.	GB
New York Yankees	87	75	.537	+1
Houston Astros	86	76	.531	—
Los Angeles Angels of Anaheim	85	77	.525	1
Minnesota Twins	83	79	.512	3
Cleveland Indians	81	80	.503	4½
Baltimore Orioles	81	81	.500	5
Tampa Bay Rays	80	82	.494	6
Boston Red Sox	78	84	.481	8
Chicago White Sox	76	86	.469	10
Seattle Mariners	76	86	.469	10
Detroit Tigers	74	87	.460	11½
Oakland Athletics	68	94	.420	18

=== Record against opponents ===
2015 American League record Source: MLB Standings Grid – 2015
Team	BAL	BOS	CWS	CLE	DET	HOU	KC	LAA	MIN	NYY	OAK	SEA	TB	TEX	TOR	NL
Baltimore	—	11–8	3–3	5–1	4–3	3–4	3–4	2–4	0–7	10–9	6–1	3–3	10–9	1–6	8–11	12–8
Boston	8–11	—	3–4	2–4	4–2	2–4	4–3	2–5	2–5	8–11	5–1	4–3	9–10	2–5	10–9	13–7
Chicago	3–3	4–3	—	10–9	9–10	5–1	7–12	4–3	6–13	2–5	5–2	4–3	1–5	3–3	4–3	9–11
Cleveland	1–5	4–2	9–10	—	7–11	5–2	9–10	4–2	7–12	5–2	3–4	4–3	5–2	3–3	3–4	12–8
Detroit	3–4	2–4	10–9	11–7	—	3–4	9–10	1–6	11–8	2–5	2–4	4–3	3–3	2–5	2–4	9–11
Houston	4–3	4–2	1–5	2–5	4–3	—	4–2	10–9	3–3	4–3	10–9	12–7	2–5	6–13	4–3	16–4
Kansas City	4–3	3–4	12–7	10–9	10–9	2–4	—	6–1	12–7	2–4	5–1	4–2	6–1	3–4	3–4	13–7
Los Angeles	4–2	5–2	3–4	2–4	6–1	9–10	1–6	—	5–2	2–4	11–8	12–7	3–3	12–7	2–5	8–12
Minnesota	7–0	5–2	13–6	12–7	8–11	3–3	7–12	2–5	—	1–5	4–3	4–3	4–2	3–3	2–5	8–12
New York	9–10	11–8	5–2	2–5	5–2	3–4	4–2	4–2	5–1	—	3–4	5–1	12–7	2–5	6–13	11–9
Oakland	1–6	1–5	2–5	4–3	4–2	9–10	1–5	8–11	3–4	4–3	—	6–13	3–4	10–9	1–5	11–9
Seattle	3–3	3–4	3–4	3–4	3–4	7–12	2–4	7–12	3–4	1–5	13–6	—	4–3	12–7	4–2	8–12
Tampa Bay	9–10	10–9	5–1	2–5	3–3	5–2	1–6	3–3	2–4	7–12	4–3	3–4	—	2–5	10–9	14–6
Texas	6–1	5–2	3–3	3–3	5–2	13–6	4–3	7–12	3–3	5–2	9–10	7–12	5–2	—	2–4	11–9
Toronto	11–8	9–10	3–4	4–3	4–2	3–4	4–3	5–2	5–2	13–6	5–1	2–4	9–10	4–2	—	12–8

== Season summary ==
New manager Paul Molitor oversaw a winning season (83–79) for his Minnesota club, following four consecutive seasons of 90 or more losses under previous manager Ron Gardenhire.

2.22 million fans attended Twins games at Target Field, the ninth highest total in the American League.

The season brought some "Twins' firsts" and broke or matched several longstanding club records:

- Facing Detroit, the Twins began the season with 24.1 scoreless innings, a club record in futility. Paul Molitor didn't get his first win until the fourth game. Among Twins managers, only Billy Martin in 1969 waited longer for his first victory.
- On May 6, rookie outfielder Eddie Rosario hit a Target Field home run on the first major league pitch he saw, something no other Twin has done.
- On June 14, three Twins hit triples in the sixth inning, a Twins first. Oddly, the Twins only scored one run in the inning. With another triple two innings earlier, the power burst added up to the club's first four-triple game since 1964. All four three-baggers were hit off Texas Rangers' starter Nick Martinez.
- In the week prior to All-Star Game, second baseman Brian Dozier belted two walk-off home runs, the first time a Twin has done that within one week. Dozier was a late addition to the American League All-Star roster as an injury replacement.
- Relief pitcher Glen Perkins set club records with 28 consecutive saves to start the season.
- Rookie Miguel Sano was called up, and blasted ten home runs in his first 41 games—the fastest start for any Twins or Washington Senators rookie.
- Eddie Rosario set a Twins rookie record by tallying fifteen triples (which led the major leagues) and tied the late Kirby Puckett's 1984 rookie club record with sixteen outfield assists.
- On September 24, first baseman Joe Mauer reached base safely in his 43rd straight game, setting a Minnesota record. The record had been held by Harmon Killebrew at 40 in 1970.
- Two days later, third baseman Trevor Plouffe grounded into his major-league-leading 28th double play. The tally tied Harmon Killebrew, in the 1970 season, for the Minnesota record.
- On Oct. 1, Brian Dozier struck out for the 146th time this season. His season finished with 148 strikeouts, topping the previous club record of 145, set by Bobby Darwin in 1972.

Two Twins made the All-Star Game: relief pitcher Glen Perkins and second baseman Brian Dozier. In the eighth inning, Dozier pinch hit and homered off Mark Melancon in his only at-bat in Cincinnati's Great American Ball Park. Perkins pitched the ninth inning in the AL's 6–3 win.

Pitchers Phil Hughes and Kyle Gibson each finished with eleven wins for tops in the Win column. No pitcher lost more than eleven games. Eight Twins finished with ten or more homers.

== Game log ==
2015 Game Log (83−76)
April: 10–12 (Home: 6–4; Away: 4–8)

#	Date	Opponent	Score	Win	Loss	Save	Attendance	Record
1	April 6	@ Tigers	0−4	Price (1−0)	**Hughes** (0−1)	Nathan (1)	45,030	0–1
2	April 8	@ Tigers	0−11	Sánchez (1−0)	**Nolasco** (0−1)	—	28,280	0−2
3	April 9	@ Tigers	1–7	Greene (1−0)	**Gibson** (0−1)	—	26,782	0–3
4	April 10	@ White Sox	6–0	**Milone** (1−0)	Noesí (0−1)	**Duensing** (1)	38,533	1–3
5	April 11	@ White Sox	4–5	Duke (1−0)	**Boyer** (0−1)	Robertson (1)	22,317	1–4
6	April 12	@ White Sox	2–6	Sale (1−0)	**Hughes** (0−2)	—	23,057	1–5
7	April 13	Royals	3–12	Duffy (1−0)	**May** (0−1)	—	40,123	1–6
8	April 15	Royals	3–1	**Gibson** (1−1)	Vólquez (1−1)	**Perkins** (1)	21,362	2–6
9	April 16	Royals	8–5	**Milone** (2−0)	Vargas (1−1)	**Perkins** (2)	17,449	3–6
10	April 17	Indians	3–2 (11)	**Boyer** (1−1)	Shaw (0−1)	—	21,307	4–6
11	April 18	Indians	2–4	Salazar (1−0)	**Hughes** (0−3)	Allen (3)	23,949	4–7
12	April 19	Indians	7–2	**May** (1−1)	House (0−2)	—	17,923	5–7
13	April 20	@ Royals	1–7	Vólquez (2−1)	**Gibson** (1−2)	—	20,393	5–8
14	April 21	@ Royals	5–6	Young (1–0)	**Fien** (0–1)	Davis (3)	20,990	5–9
15	April 22	@ Royals	3–0	**Pelfrey** (1–0)	Guthrie (1–1)	**Perkins** (3)	24,721	6–9
16	April 24	@ Mariners	0–2	Hernández (3–0)	**Hughes** (0–4)	—	25,215	6–10
17	April 25	@ Mariners	8–5	**Stauffer** (1–0)	Paxton (0–2)	**Perkins** (4)	33,566	7–10
18	April 26	@ Mariners	4–2 (11)	**Fien** (1–1)	Olson (1–1)	**Perkins** (5)	35,242	8–10
19	April 27	Tigers	4–5	Price (2–1)	**Milone** (2–1)	Soria (8)	18,054	8–11
20	April 28	Tigers	3–2	**Pelfrey** (2–0)	Sánchez (1–3)	**Perkins** (6)	18,169	9–11
21	April 29	Tigers	7–10	Gorzelanny (1–1)	**Fien** (1–2)	Soria (9)	19,447	9–12
22	April 30	White Sox	12–2	**May** (2–1)	Sale (2–1)	—	20,736	10–12

May: 20–7 (Home: 13–3; Away: 7–4)

#	Date	Opponent	Score	Win	Loss	Save	Attendance	Record
23	May 1	White Sox	1–0	**Gibson** (2–2)	Quintana (1–2)	**Perkins** (7)	22,794	11–12
24	May 2	White Sox	5–3	**Nolasco** (1–1)	Noesí (0–3)	**Perkins** (8)	30,551	12–12
25	May 3	White Sox	13–3	**Pressly** (1–0)	Danks (1–3)	—	22,423	13–12
26	May 4	Athletics	8–7	**Hughes** (1–4)	Hahn (1–2)	**Perkins** (9)	20,605	14–12
27	May 5	Athletics	1–2	Chavez (1–2)	**May** (2–2)	Clippard (3)	18,135	14–13
28	May 6	Athletics	13–0	**Gibson** (3–2)	Kazmir (2–1)	—	18,866	15–13
29	May 7	Athletics	6–5	**Nolasco** (2–1)	Pomeranz (1–3)	**Perkins** (10)	22,379	16–13
30	May 8	@ Indians	9–3	**Pelfrey** (3–0)	Bauer (3–3)	—	19,102	17–13
31	May 9	@ Indians	7–4	**Hughes** (2–4)	Chen (0–1)	**Perkins** (11)	16,199	18–13
32	May 10	@ Indians	2–8	Salazar (4–1)	**May** (2–3)	—	13,769	18–14
33	May 12	@ Tigers	1–2 (10)	Nesbitt (1–1)	**Pressly** (1–1)	—	26,177	18–15
34	May 13	@ Tigers	6–2	**Nolasco** (3–1)	Kyle Lobstein (3–3)	—	27,163	19–15
35	May 14	@ Tigers	1–13	Sánchez (3–4)	**Pelfrey** (3–1)	—	31,785	19–16
36	May 15	Rays	3–2	**Hughes** (3–4)	Odorizzi (3–3)	**Perkins** (12)	24,018	20–16
37	May 16	Rays	6–4	**Duensing** (1–0)	Jepsen (1–3)	**Perkins** (13)	27,128	21–16
38	May 17	Rays	3–11	Archer (4–4)	**Gibson** (3–3)	—	23,708	21–17
39	May 19	@ Pirates	8–5	**Nolasco** (4–1)	Liriano (1–4)	**Perkins** (14)	22,357	22–17
40	May 20	@ Pirates	4–3 (13)	**Duensing** (2–0)	Bastardo (0–1)	**Perkins** (15)	21,718	23–17
41	May 22	@ White Sox	2–3	Samardzija (4–2)	**Thompson** (0–1)	Robertson (9)	21,067	23–18
42	May 23	@ White Sox	4–3	**May** (3–3)	Sale (3–2)	**Perkins** (16)	38,714	24–18
43	May 24	@ White Sox	8–1	**Gibson** (4–3)	Quintana (2–5)	—	30,180	25–18
44	May 25	Red Sox	7–2	**Nolasco** (5–1)	Kelly (1–4)	—	29,472	26–18
45	May 26	Red Sox	2–1	**Pelfrey** (4–1)	Buchholz (2–6)	**Perkins** (17)	23,268	27–18
46	May 27	Red Sox	6–4	**Hughes** (4–4)	Porcello (4–4)	**Perkins** (18)	30,027	28–18
47	May 29	Blue Jays	4–6	Buehrle (6–4)	**Perkins** (0–1)	—	24,509	28–19
48	May 30	Blue Jays	3–2	**Pressly** (2–1)	Loup (1–3)	**Boyer** (1)	32,076	29–19
49	May 31	Blue Jays	6–5	**Pressly** (3–1)	Osuna (1–2)	**Perkins** (19)	33,829	30–19

June: 11–17 (Home: 6–8; Away: 5–9)

#	Date	Opponent	Score	Win	Loss	Save	Attendance	Record
–	June 1	@ Red Sox	**Postponed (rain)** (Makeup date: June 3)					
50	June 2	@ Red Sox	0–1	Buchholz (3–6)	**Pelfrey** (4–2)	Uehara (11)	32,622	30–20
51	June 3	@ Red Sox	3–6	Rodríguez (2–0)	**Hughes** (4–5)	—	31,704	30–21
52	June 3	@ Red Sox	2–0	**May** (4–3)	Porcello (4–5)	**Perkins** (20)	33,291	31–21
53	June 4	@ Red Sox	8–4	**Thompson** (1–1)	Uehara (2–3)	—	33,615	32–21
54	June 5	Brewers	5–10	Jeffress (2–0)	**Boyer** (1–2)	—	29,398	32–22
55	June 6	Brewers	2–4	Garza (4–7)	**Pressly** (3–2)	Rodríguez (10)	38,707	32–23
56	June 7	Brewers	2–0	**Pelfrey** (5–2)	Fiers (2–6)	**Perkins** (21)	31,911	33–23
57	June 8	Royals	1–3	Vargas (5–2)	**Hughes** (4–6)	Holland (10)	22,796	33–24
58	June 9	Royals	0–2	Young (5–2)	**May** (4–4)	Holland (11)	22,497	33–25
59	June 10	Royals	2–7	Vólquez (5–4)	**Gibson** (4–4)	—	28,434	33–26
60	June 12	@ Rangers	1–2	Scheppers (3–0)	**Thompson** (1–2)	—	41,765	33–27
61	June 13	@ Rangers	7–11	Lewis (6–3)	**Pelfrey** (5–3)	—	28,661	33–28
62	June 14	@ Rangers	4–3	**Fien** (2–2)	Tolleson (1–1)	**Perkins** (22)	33,970	34–28
63	June 15	@ Cardinals	2–3	Lackey (5–4)	**May** (4–5)	Siegrist (2)	43,174	34–29
64	June 16	@ Cardinals	2–3	Wacha (9–2)	**Gibson** (4–5)	Siegrist (3)	41,203	34–30
65	June 17	Cardinals	3–1	**Milone** (3–1)	Martínez (7–3)	**Perkins** (23)	34,381	35–30
66	June 18	Cardinals	2–1	**Boyer** (2–2)	Villanueva (3–2)	—	34,648	36–30
67	June 19	Cubs	7–2	**Hughes** (5–6)	Hendricks (2–3)	—	36,817	37–30
68	June 20	Cubs	1–4	Motte (4–1)	**Boyer** (2–3)	Rondon (12)	40,066	37–31
69	June 21	Cubs	0–8	Arrieta (7–5)	**Gibson** (4–6)	—	40,273	37–32
70	June 22	White Sox	13–2	**Milone** (4–1)	Danks (3–8)	—	24,094	38–32
71	June 23	White Sox	2–6	Samardzija (5–4)	**Pelfrey** (5–4)	Petricka (2)	27,349	38–33
72	June 24	White Sox	6–1	**Hughes** (6–6)	Sale (6–4)	—	28,854	39–33
73	June 26	@ Brewers	4–10	Lohse (4–9)	**May** (4–6)	—	33,296	39–34
74	June 27	@ Brewers	5–2	**Gibson** (5–6)	Garza (4–10)	**Perkins** (24)	39,977	40–34
75	June 28	@ Brewers	3–5	Smith (4–0)	**Fien** (2–3)	—	38,958	40–35
76	June 29	@ Reds	7–11	Adcock (1–1)	**Pelfrey** (5–5)	—	28,904	40–36
77	June 30	@ Reds	8–5	**Hughes** (7–6)	DeSclafani (5–6)	**Perkins** (25)	28,556	41–36

July: 12–13 (Home: 8–6; Away: 4–7)

#	Date	Opponent	Score	Win	Loss	Save	Attendance	Record
78	July 1	@ Reds	1–2	Cueto (5–5)	**May** (4–7)	Chapman (16)	26,459	41–37
79	July 2	@ Royals	2–0	**Gibson** (6–6)	Young (7–4)	**Perkins** (26)	37,196	42–37
80	July 3	@ Royals	2–3	Davis (4–1)	**Thompson** (1–3)	—	38,868	42–38
81	July 4	@ Royals	5–3	**Duensing** (3–0)	Blanton (2–2)	**Perkins** (27)	37,917	43–38
82	July 5	@ Royals	2–3	Holland (2–0)	**Boyer** (2–4)	—	29,427	43–39
83	July 6	Orioles	4–2	**May** (5–7)	Hunter (2–2)	—	23,213	44–39
84	July 7	Orioles	8–3	**Gibson** (7–6)	Gausman (1–1)	—	25,091	45–39
85	July 8	Orioles	5–3	**Milone** (5–1)	Norris (2–9)	**Perkins** (28)	29,289	46–39
86	July 9	Tigers	2–4	Price (9–2)	**Pelfrey** (5–6)	Soria (20)	29,724	46–40
87	July 10	Tigers	8–6	**May** (6–7)	Soria (3–1)	—	31,545	47–40
88	July 11	Tigers	9–5	**Hughes** (8–6)	Simón (8–6)	—	32,365	48–40
89	July 12	Tigers	7–1	**Gibson** (8–6)	Greene (4–7)	—	27,936	49–40
–	July 14	86th All-Star Game	National League vs. American League (Great American Ball Park, Cincinnati)					
90	July 17	@ Athletics	5–0	**Santana** (1–0)	Gray (10–4)	—	23,462	50–40
91	July 18	@ Athletics	2–3 (10)	Pomeranz (4–3)	**Fien** (2–4)	—	30,778	50–41
92	July 19	@ Athletics	1–14	Chavez (5–9)	**Milone** (5–2)	—	20,286	50–42
93	July 21	@ Angels	0–7	Shoemaker (5–7)	**Gibson** (8–7)	—	38,937	50–43
94	July 22	@ Angels	2–5	Wilson (8–7)	**Pelfrey** (5–7)	Street (25)	40,239	50–44
95	July 23	@ Angels	3–0	**Santana** (2–0)	Richards (10–7)	**Perkins** (29)	36,134	51–44
96	July 24	Yankees	10–1	**Hughes** (9–6)	Pineda (9–7)	—	34,334	52–44
97	July 25	Yankees	5–8	Warren (6–5)	**Perkins** (0–2)	Miller (23)	40,660	52–45
98	July 26	Yankees	2–7	Eovaldi (10–2)	**Gibson** (8–8)	—	37,391	52–46
99	July 28	Pirates	7–8	Melancon (2–1)	**Perkins** (0–3)	—	30,795	52–47
100	July 29	Pirates	4–10	Liriano (7–6)	**Santana** (2–1)	—	37,273	52–48
101	July 30	Mariners	9–5	**Hughes** (10–6)	Happ (4–6)	—	30,534	53–48
102	July 31	Mariners	1–6	Walker (8–7)	**Milone** (5–3)	—	27,643	53–49

August: 14–14 (Home: 7–4; Away: 7–10)

#	Date	Opponent	Score	Win	Loss	Save	Attendance	Record
103	August 1	Mariners	3–2	**May** (7–7)	Smith (1–5)	—	36,901	54–49
104	August 2	Mariners	1–4 (11)	Rodney (4–4)	**Jepsen** (2–6)	Wilhelmsen (2)	30,325	54–50
105	August 3	@ Blue Jays	1–5	Price (10–4)	**Santana** (2–2)	—	45,766	54–51
106	August 4	@ Blue Jays	1–3	Estrada (9–6)	**Hughes** (10–7)	Osuna (8)	26,504	54–52
107	August 5	@ Blue Jays	7–9	Hutchison (10–2)	**Duffey** (0–1)	Hawkins (3)	27,725	54–53
108	August 6	@ Blue Jays	3–9	Buehrle (12–5)	**Gibson** (8–9)	—	34,847	54–54
109	August 7	@ Indians	10–9	**May** (8–7)	Shaw (1–2)	**Perkins** (30)	30,365	55–54
110	August 8	@ Indians	4–17	Bauer (9–8)	**Santana** (2–3)	—	31,666	55–55
111	August 9	@ Indians	1–8	Kluber (7–12)	**Hughes** (10–8)	—	31,666	55–56
112	August 11	Rangers	3–2	**Perkins** (1–3)	Patton (1–1)	—	26,663	56–56
113	August 12	Rangers	11–1	**Pelfrey** (6–7)	Martinez (7–7)	—	30,683	57–56
114	August 13	Rangers	5–6	Kela (6–5)	**Fien** (2–5)	Tolleson (21)	30,357	57–57
115	August 14	Indians	1–6	Kluber (8–12)	**May** (8–8)	—	26,910	57–58
116	August 15	Indians	4–1	**Duffey** (1–1)	Tomlin (0–1)	—	30,601	58–58
117	August 16	Indians	4–1	**Milone** (6–3)	Carrasco (11–9)	**Perkins** (31)	27,244	59–58
118	August 17	@ Yankees	7–8 (10)	Miller (1–2)	**Perkins** (1–4)	—	38,943	59–59
119	August 18	@ Yankees	4–8	Rumbelow (1–0)	**Graham** (0–1)	Miller (27)	38,007	59–60
120	August 19	@ Yankees	3–4	Eovaldi (13–2)	**Santana** (2–4)	Betances (8)	38,086	59–61
121	August 20	@ Orioles	15–2	**Duffey** (2–1)	González (9–9)	—	20,109	60–61
122	August 21	@ Orioles	4–3	**Fien** (3–5)	O'Day (5–2)	**Jepsen** (6)	32,025	61–61
123	August 22	@ Orioles	3–2	**Fien** (4–5)	Tillman (9–8)	**Jepsen** (7)	35,301	62–61
124	August 23	@ Orioles	4–3 (12)	**Perkins** (2–4)	Matusz (1–3)	**Milone** (1)	35,144	63–61
125	August 25	@ Rays	11–7	**Graham** (1–1)	Andriese (3–4)	—	9,632	64–61
126	August 26	@ Rays	5–3	**Duensing** (4–0)	Archer (11–10)	**Jepsen** (8)	9,205	65–61
127	August 27	@ Rays	4–5	Gomes (2–4)	**Milone** (6–4)	Boxberger (31)	9,375	65–62
128	August 28	Astros	3–0	**Gibson** (9–9)	Kazmir (7–9)	**Jepsen** (9)	28,636	66–62
129	August 29	Astros	1–4	Fiers (2–0)	**Pelfrey** (6–8)	Gregerson (25)	38,876	66–63
130	August 30	Astros	7–5	**Santana** (3–4)	McCullers (5–5)	—	28,877	67–63

September: 15–13 (Home: 6–7; Away: 9–6 )

#	Date	Opponent	Score	Win	Loss	Save	Attendance	Record
131	September 1	White Sox	8–6	**Jepsen** (3–6)	Duke (3–5)	**Perkins** (32)	25,803	68–63
132	September 2	White Sox	3–0	**Milone** (7–4)	Rodón (6-6)	**Jepsen** (10)	22,162	69–63
133	September 3	White Sox	4–6	Samardzija (9–11)	**Fien** (4–6)	Robertson (28)	25,339	69–64
134	September 4	@ Astros	0–8	McHugh (15–7)	**Pelfrey** (6–9)	—	27,807	69–65
135	September 5	@ Astros	3–2	**Santana** (4–4)	Gregerson (7–3)	**Jepsen** (11)	27,643	70–65
136	September 6	@ Astros	5–8	Keuchel (17–6)	**May** (8–9)	Gregerson (26)	37,648	70–66
137	September 7	@ Royals	6–2	**Milone** (8–4)	Ventura (10–8)	—	36,825	71–66
138	September 8	@ Royals	2–4	Vólquez (13–7)	**Gibson** (9–10)	Holland (30)	31,834	71–67
139	September 9	@ Royals	3–2 (12)	**Boyer** (3–4)	Morales (3–2)	**Jepsen** (12)	32,286	72–67
140	September 11	@ White Sox	6–2	**Santana** (5–4)	Jones (1–2)	—	15,641	73–67
141	September 12	@ White Sox	2–8	Quintana (9–10)	**Milone** (8–5)	—	26.065	73–68
142	September 13	@ White Sox	7–0	**Gibson** (10-10)	Sale (12–9)	—	23,159	74–68
143	September 14	Tigers	7–1	**Duffey** (3–1)	Lobstein (3–8)	—	17,833	75–68
144	September 15	Tigers	4–5	Simón (13–9)	**Hughes** (10–9)	Rondón (5)	22,963	75–69
145	September 16	Tigers	4–7 (12)	Krol (2–3)	**Duensing** (4–1)	—	22,509	75–70
146	September 17	Angels	8–11	Morin (2–1)	**Achter** (0–1)	Street (36)	18,697	75–71
–	September 18	Angels	**Postponed (rain)** (Makeup date: September 19)					
147	September 19	Angels	3–4 (12)	Morin (3–1)	**Boyer** (3–5)	Street (37)	22,878	75–72
148	September 19	Angels	2–5	Richards (14–11)	**Pelfrey** (6–10)	Street (38)	33,300	75–73
149	September 20	Angels	8–1	**Duffey** (4–1)	Shoemaker (7–10)	—	25,302	76–73
150	September 22	Indians	3–1	**Santana** (6–4)	Salazar (13−9)	**Jepsen** (13)		77–73
151	September 23	Indians	4–2	**Hughes** (11–9)	Kluber (8–15)	—	17,831	78–73
152	September 24	Indians	3–6	Anderson (6–3)	**Gibson** (10−11)	Allen (32)	21,366	78–74
153	September 25	@ Tigers	4–6	Wilson (3-3)	**Perkins** (2–5)	Feliz (9)	31,153	78–75
154	September 26	@ Tigers	6–2	**Duffey** (5–1)	Simón (13–11)	—	32,753	79–75
155	September 27	@ Tigers	7–1	**Santana** (7–4)	Wolf (0–5)	—	33,517	80–75
156	September 28	@ Indians	4–2	**Milone** (9–5)	Kluber (8–16)	**Jepsen** (14)	10,007	81–75
–	September 29	@ Indians	**Postponed (rain)** (Makeup date: September 30)					
157	September 30	@ Indians	7–1	**Gibson** (11-11)	Carrasco (14–12)	—	0	82–75
158	September 30	@ Indians	2–10	Anderson (7–3)	**Pelfrey** (6–11)	—	10,228	82–76

October: 1–3 (Home: 0–3; Away: 1–0 )

#	Date	Opponent	Score	Win	Loss	Save	Attendance	Record
159	October 1	@ Indians	4–2	**Perkins** (3–5)	Allen (2–5)	**Jepsen** (14)	22,644	83–76
160	October 2	Royals	1–3	Coleman (1–0)	**Santana** (7–5)	Davis (16)	31,534	83–77
161	October 3	Royals	1–5	Ventura (13–8)	**Boyer** (3–6)	Davis (17)	30,181	83–78
162	October 4	Royals	1–6	Cueto (11–13)	**Nolasco** (5–2)	—	24,108	83–79

Legend: = Win = Loss = Postponement
Bold = Twins team member

== Roster ==
2015 Minnesota Twins
Roster
Pitchers: 58 A. J. Achter; 36 Blaine Boyer; 55 Neal Cotts; 52 Brian Duensing; 56 Tyler Duffey; 50 Casey Fien; 44 Kyle Gibson; 62 J. R. Graham; 45 Phil Hughes; 49 Kevin Jepsen; 65 Trevor May; 51 Alex Meyer; 33 Tommy Milone; 47 Ricky Nolasco; 61 Ryan O'Rourke; 37 Mike Pelfrey; 15 Glen Perkins; 57 Ryan Pressly; 54 Ervin Santana; 22 Tim Stauffer; 56 Caleb Thielbar; 64 Aaron Thompson; 59 Michael Tonkin	Catchers: 26 Eric Fryer; 12 Chris Herrmann; 8 Kurt Suzuki; Infielders: 17 Doug Bernier; 2 Brian Dozier; 5 Eduardo Escobar; 7 Joe Mauer; 9 Eduardo Núñez; 24 Trevor Plouffe; 11 Jorge Polanco; 22 Miguel Sanó; 39 Danny Santana; 19 Kennys Vargas	Outfielders: 31 Oswaldo Arcia; 25 Byron Buxton; 32 Aaron Hicks; 48 Torii Hunter; 67 Max Kepler; 21 Shane Robinson; 20 Eddie Rosario; 1 Jordan Schafer	Manager: 4 Paul Molitor; Coaches: 41 Neil Allen (pitching); 23 Tom Brunansky (hitting); 75 Nate Dammann (bullpen catcher); 40 Butch Davis (first base); 13 Gene Glynn (third base); 18 Eddie Guardado (bullpen); 63 Rudy Hernández (assistant hitting); 46 Joe Vavra (bench)

== Statistics ==
=== Batting ===
Note: G = Games played; AB = At bats; R = Runs scored; H = Hits; 2B = Doubles; 3B = Triples; HR = Home runs; RBI = Runs batted in; BB = Base on balls; SO = Strikeouts; AVG = Batting average; SB = Stolen bases

Player	G	AB	R	H	2B	3B	HR	RBI	BB	SO	AVG	SB
Oswaldo Arcia, OF	19	58	6	16	0	0	2	8	4	15	.276	0
Doug Bernier, 3B, 2B	4	5	1	1	1	0	0	2	1	3	.200	0
Byron Buxton, CF	46	129	16	27	7	1	2	6	6	44	.209	2
Brian Dozier, 2B	157	628	101	148	39	4	28	77	61	148	.236	12
Brian Duensing, P	55	1	0	0	0	0	0	0	0	0	.000	0
Eduardo Escobar, LF, SS, DH, 3B, 2B	127	409	48	107	31	4	12	58	28	86	.262	2
Eric Fryer, C	15	22	2	5	2	0	0	2	5	11	.227	0
Kyle Gibson, P	32	5	0	1	0	0	0	0	0	2	.200	0
Chris Herrmann, C	45	103	13	15	5	1	2	10	7	37	.146	0
Aaron Hicks, CF	97	352	48	90	11	3	11	33	34	66	.256	13
Phil Hughes, P	27	3	0	0	0	0	0	0	0	0	.000	0
Torii Hunter, RF	139	521	67	125	22	0	22	81	35	105	.240	2
Max Kepler, RF	3	7	0	1	0	0	0	0	0	3	.143	0
Joe Mauer, 1B, DH	158	592	69	157	34	2	10	66	67	112	.265	2
Trevor May, P	48	3	0	0	0	0	0	0	0	3	.000	0
Tommy Milone, P	24	2	0	0	0	0	0	0	0	1	.000	0
Ricky Nolasco, P	9	3	0	0	0	0	0	0	0	3	.000	0
Eduardo Núñez, SS, DH, 3B	72	188	23	53	14	1	4	20	12	29	.282	8
Mike Pelfrey, P	30	3	0	2	0	0	0	0	0	1	.667	0
Trevor Plouffe, 3B	152	573	74	140	35	4	22	86	50	124	.244	2
Jorge Polanco, SS	4	10	1	3	0	0	0	1	2	1	.300	1
Shane Robinson, OF	83	180	28	45	7	3	0	16	12	29	.250	6
Eddie Rosario, LF	122	453	60	121	18	15	13	50	15	118	.267	11
Miguel Sanó, DH	80	279	46	75	17	1	18	52	53	119	.269	1
Danny Santana, SS	91	261	30	56	10	5	0	21	6	68	.215	8
Jordan Schafer, CF	27	69	9	15	3	0	0	5	3	23	.217	0
Kurt Suzuki, C	131	433	36	104	17	0	5	50	29	59	.240	0
Kennys Vargas, DH, 1B	58	175	18	42	4	0	5	17	9	54	.240	0
Team totals	162	5467	696	1349	277	44	156	661	439	1264	.247	70

=== Pitching ===
Note: W = Wins; L = Losses; ERA = Earned run average; G = Games pitched; GS = Games started; SV = Saves; IP = Innings pitched; H = Hits allowed; R = Runs allowed; ER = Earned runs allowed; HR = Home runs allowed; BB = Walks allowed; K = Strikeouts

Player	W	L	ERA	G	GS	SV	IP	H	R	ER	HR	BB	K
A. J. Achter	0	1	6.75	11	0	0	13.1	12	10	10	4	6	14
Blaine Boyer	3	6	2.49	68	0	1	65.0	62	24	18	5	19	33
Neal Cotts	0	0	3.95	17	0	0	13.2	14	8	6	3	5	9
Brian Duensing	4	1	4.25	55	0	1	48.2	46	24	23	5	21	24
Tyler Duffey	5	1	3.10	10	10	0	58.0	56	20	20	4	20	53
Casey Fien	4	6	3.55	62	0	0	63.1	61	26	25	6	8	41
Kyle Gibson	11	11	3.84	32	32	0	194.2	186	88	83	18	65	145
J. R. Graham	1	1	4.95	39	1	0	63.2	73	41	35	10	21	53
Phil Hughes	11	9	4.40	27	25	0	155.1	184	76	76	29	16	94
Kevin Jepsen	1	1	1.61	29	0	10	28.0	18	5	5	1	7	25
Trevor May	8	9	4.00	48	16	0	114.2	127	53	51	11	26	110
Alex Meyer	0	0	16.88	2	0	0	2.2	4	5	5	2	3	3
Tommy Milone	9	5	3.92	24	23	1	128.2	128	64	56	17	36	91
Ricky Nolasco	5	2	6.75	9	8	0	37.1	50	31	28	3	14	35
Ryan O'Rourke	0	0	6.14	28	0	0	22.0	16	15	15	3	15	24
Mike Pelfrey	6	11	4.26	30	30	0	164.2	198	86	78	11	45	86
Glen Perkins	3	5	3.32	60	0	32	57.0	58	21	21	9	10	54
Ryan Pressly	3	2	2.93	27	0	0	27.2	27	9	9	0	12	22
Shane Robinson	0	0	0.00	1	0	0	1.0	0	0	0	0	1	1
Ervin Santana	7	5	4.00	17	17	0	108.0	104	50	48	12	36	82
Tim Stauffer	1	0	6.60	13	0	0	15.0	24	13	11	4	7	6
Caleb Thielbar	0	0	5.40	6	0	0	5.0	5	3	3	0	0	5
Aaron Thompson	1	3	5.01	41	0	0	32.1	32	19	18	2	11	17
Michael Tonkin	0	0	3.47	26	0	0	23.1	21	9	9	4	9	19
Team totals	83	79	4.07	162	162	45	1443.0	1506	700	653	163	413	1046

== Awards ==
- Team MVP and Twins Most Outstanding Rookie: Miguel Sanó, at 22 the youngest player to be named Twins MVP and just the second to win the award as a rookie, joining Tony Oliva in 1964.

== Farm system ==
Level	Team	League	Manager
AAA	Rochester Red Wings	International League	Mike Quade
AA	Chattanooga Lookouts	Southern League	Doug Mientkiewicz
A-Advanced	Fort Myers Miracle	Florida State League	Jeff Smith
A	Cedar Rapids Kernels	Midwest League	Jake Mauer
Rookie	Elizabethton Twins	Appalachian League	Ray Smith
Rookie	GCL Twins	Arizona League	Ramón Borrego
Rookie	DSL Twins	Dominican Summer League	Jimmy Alvarez

LEAGUE CHAMPIONS: Chattanooga
