= 2015 Chicago White Sox season =

2015 Chicago White Sox
- League: American League
- Division: Central
- Ballpark: U.S. Cellular Field
- City: Chicago, Illinois
- Record: 76–86 (.469)
- Divisional place: 4th
- Owners: Jerry Reinsdorf
- General managers: Rick Hahn
- Managers: Robin Ventura
- Television: CSN Chicago; CSN+ WGN-TV; WPWR-TV (Ken Harrelson, Steve Stone, Chuck Swirsky)
- Radio: WSCR; Chicago White Sox Radio Network (Ed Farmer, Darrin Jackson); WRTO-AM (Spanish) (Hector Molina, Billy Russo)

The 2015 Chicago White Sox season was the club's 116th season in Chicago and 115th in the American League.

== Offseason ==
The 2014 Chicago White Sox ended with a 73–89 record, a 10-game improvement over 2013. General Manager Rick Hahn gave the season a "fail" grade, citing the lack of a championship. The White Sox front office set up an "aggressive" offseason plan, focusing on improving a bullpen that blew 21 saves and had the 3rd-worst earned run average in baseball. Despite losing 188 games the previous two seasons, Robin Ventura is set to remain as manager for the 2015 season.

=== Roster changes ===
The White Sox offseason started at the end of October when Moises Sierra was claimed by the Kansas City Royals off waivers. Shortly following this, the Sox declined Felipe Paulino's option for 2015, after going 0–2 in just four starts. Reliever Matt Lindstrom also elected free agency at the end of the month after an ankle injury kept him off the mound for most of 2014.

On November 3, the White Sox claimed outfielder J. B. Shuck off waivers from the Cleveland Indians. Two weeks later, the team began its quest to improve the bullpen by signing free agent reliever Zach Duke to a three year/$15 million contract. The rest of November included mostly minor league moves, until the White Sox signed free agent first baseman Adam LaRoche to a two year/$25 million contract on November 25. The corresponding roster move was to designate pitcher Scott Carroll for assignment, who would later become a free agent.

The 2014 Winter Meetings ran from December 7–11 in San Diego. The White Sox' first move of the Winter Meetings was to claim catcher Rob Brantly of waivers from Miami. Late that night, there were rumors that the White Sox were close to singing David Robertson from the New York Yankees as well as trading for Jeff Samardzija from the Oakland Athletics. On December 9, the club officially announced a four-year, $46 million contract with Robertson and acquired pitchers Jeff Samardzija and Michael Ynoa from Oakland for infielders Marcus Semien and Rangel Ravelo, catcher Josh Phegley and pitcher Chris Bassitt. They finished off the Winter Meetings by trading pitcher Andre Rienzo to Miami for pitcher Dan Jennings.

On December 16, the White Sox announced the signing of outfielder Melky Cabrera to a three-year, $42 million contract. The White Sox cited the increase in ticket sales following the Robertson and Samardzija signings as motivation for signing Cabrera. On January 5, 2015, the club signed infielder Emilio Bonifacio to a one-year, $4 million contract. The last major move of the off-season was a surprise, as the White Sox signed infielder Gordon Beckham, whom they had traded to the Los Angeles Angels just a few months prior, to a one-year, $2 million contract and designated outfielder Dayán Viciedo for assignment.

=== Events and news ===
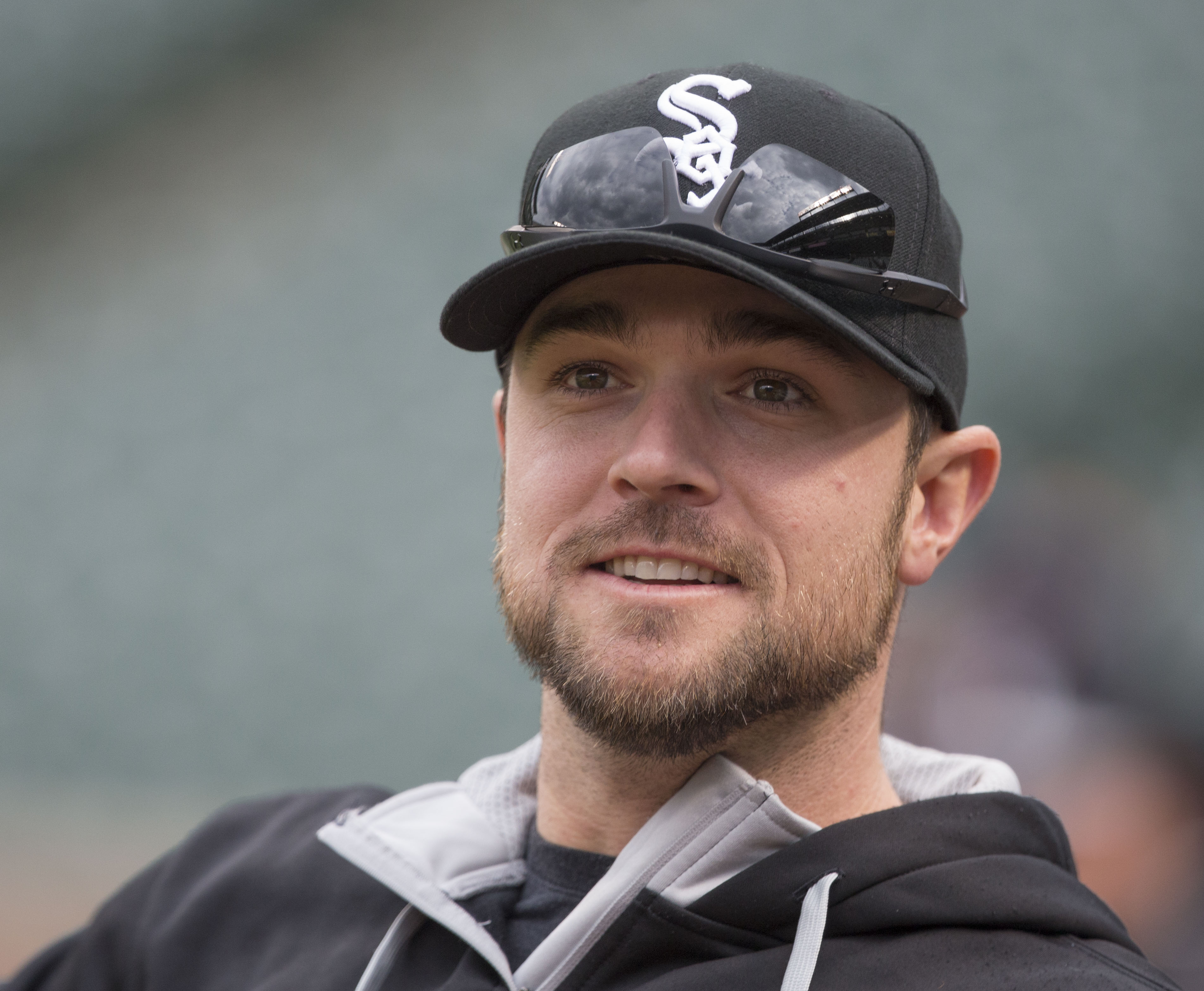
Closer David Robertson.

On October 30, the Baseball Hall of Fame announced the 10 candidates for election via the Golden Era Committee. Among the candidates were White Sox legends Minnie Miñoso and Billy Pierce; Dick Allen, who won the 1972 American League Most Valuable Player award; and Jim Kaat, who played two and a half seasons with the White Sox. On December 8, the Hall of Fame announced that none of the candidates earned the required 12 voters, with Allen earning 11 votes, Kaat earning 10, Minoso earning 8, and Pierce receiving less than 3. White Sox chairman Jerry Reinsdorf was "disappointed" in the results, particularly the rejection of 90-year-old Minoso, saying "I don't know what player out of the era of the 1950s and early '60s would be more deserving than Minnie."

On December 7, the media reported that the White Sox had denied the Toronto Blue Jays permission to interview Executive Vice President Ken Williams for their opening at club president. Reinsdorf was reportedly upset that the Blue Jays asked for permission during the Winter Meetings. When he talked to Williams about it, Williams said that Toronto had already contacted him, which is considered tampering under Major League Baseball rules. The White Sox opted not to pursue recourse.

On February 19, the club released their 2015 broadcast schedule, with 106 games on Comcast SportsNet Chicago, 35 games on WGN-TV, and 20 games on WPWR-TV. This is a change from previous seasons, where a small amount of WGN produced games were broadcast on WCIU-TV instead of WPWR. It had previously been announced that games on WGN-TV would no longer be simulcast nationally on WGN America, ending Major League Baseball's superstation era. Spanish radio broadcasts switched from WEBG (formerly WNUA) back to 1200 WRTO-AM.

On March 1, White Sox legend Minnie Miñoso died early in the morning due to a heart-related issue. Hundreds of Sox fans attended the funeral of "Mr. White Sox" on March 7.

== Regular season ==
=== Season standings ===
==== American League Central ====
AL Central
Team	W	L	Pct.	GB	Home	Road
Kansas City Royals	95	67	.586	—	51‍–‍30	44‍–‍37
Minnesota Twins	83	79	.512	12	46‍–‍35	37‍–‍44
Cleveland Indians	81	80	.503	13½	39‍–‍41	42‍–‍39
Chicago White Sox	76	86	.469	19	40‍–‍41	36‍–‍45
Detroit Tigers	74	87	.460	20½	38‍–‍43	36‍–‍44

==== American League Wild Card ====
Division leaders
Team	W	L	Pct.
Kansas City Royals	95	67	.586
Toronto Blue Jays	93	69	.574
Texas Rangers	88	74	.543

Wild Card teams (Top 2 teams qualify for postseason)
Team	W	L	Pct.	GB
New York Yankees	87	75	.537	+1
Houston Astros	86	76	.531	—
Los Angeles Angels	85	77	.525	1
Minnesota Twins	83	79	.512	3
Cleveland Indians	81	80	.503	4½
Baltimore Orioles	81	81	.500	5
Tampa Bay Rays	80	82	.494	6
Boston Red Sox	78	84	.481	8
Chicago White Sox	76	86	.469	10
Seattle Mariners	76	86	.469	10
Detroit Tigers	74	87	.460	11½
Oakland Athletics	68	94	.420	18

==== Record against opponents ====
2015 American League record Source: MLB Standings Grid – 2015
Team	BAL	BOS	CWS	CLE	DET	HOU	KC	LAA	MIN	NYY	OAK	SEA	TB	TEX	TOR	NL
Baltimore	—	11–8	3–3	5–1	4–3	3–4	3–4	2–4	0–7	10–9	6–1	3–3	10–9	1–6	8–11	12–8
Boston	8–11	—	3–4	2–4	4–2	2–4	4–3	2–5	2–5	8–11	5–1	4–3	9–10	2–5	10–9	13–7
Chicago	3–3	4–3	—	10–9	9–10	5–1	7–12	4–3	6–13	2–5	5–2	4–3	1–5	3–3	4–3	9–11
Cleveland	1–5	4–2	9–10	—	7–11	5–2	9–10	4–2	7–12	5–2	3–4	4–3	5–2	3–3	3–4	12–8
Detroit	3–4	2–4	10–9	11–7	—	3–4	9–10	1–6	11–8	2–5	2–4	4–3	3–3	2–5	2–4	9–11
Houston	4–3	4–2	1–5	2–5	4–3	—	4–2	10–9	3–3	4–3	10–9	12–7	2–5	6–13	4–3	16–4
Kansas City	4–3	3–4	12–7	10–9	10–9	2–4	—	6–1	12–7	2–4	5–1	4–2	6–1	3–4	3–4	13–7
Los Angeles	4–2	5–2	3–4	2–4	6–1	9–10	1–6	—	5–2	2–4	11–8	12–7	3–3	12–7	2–5	8–12
Minnesota	7–0	5–2	13–6	12–7	8–11	3–3	7–12	2–5	—	1–5	4–3	4–3	4–2	3–3	2–5	8–12
New York	9–10	11–8	5–2	2–5	5–2	3–4	4–2	4–2	5–1	—	3–4	5–1	12–7	2–5	6–13	11–9
Oakland	1–6	1–5	2–5	4–3	4–2	9–10	1–5	8–11	3–4	4–3	—	6–13	3–4	10–9	1–5	11–9
Seattle	3–3	3–4	3–4	3–4	3–4	7–12	2–4	7–12	3–4	1–5	13–6	—	4–3	12–7	4–2	8–12
Tampa Bay	9–10	10–9	5–1	2–5	3–3	5–2	1–6	3–3	2–4	7–12	4–3	3–4	—	2–5	10–9	14–6
Texas	6–1	5–2	3–3	3–3	5–2	13–6	4–3	7–12	3–3	5–2	9–10	7–12	5–2	—	2–4	11–9
Toronto	11–8	9–10	3–4	4–3	4–2	3–4	4–3	5–2	5–2	13–6	5–1	2–4	9–10	4–2	—	12–8

=== Detailed records ===
American League
Opponent	W	L	WP	RS	RA
AL East
Baltimore Orioles	3	3	0.500	13	27
Boston Red Sox	4	3	0.571	39	34
New York Yankees	2	5	0.286	26	40
Tampa Bay Rays	1	5	0.167	23	35
Toronto Blue Jays	4	3	0.571	28	29
Total	14	19	0.424	129	165
AL West
Houston Astros	5	1	0.833	23	10
Los Angeles Angels of Anaheim	4	3	0.571	26	14
Oakland Athletics	5	2	0.714	43	44
Seattle Mariners	4	3	0.571	39	31
Texas Rangers	3	3	0.500	19	25
Total	21	12	0.636	150	124
AL Central
Chicago White Sox					
Cleveland Indians	10	9	0.526	73	66
Detroit Tigers	9	10	0.474	68	80
Kansas City Royals	7	12	0.368	76	79
Minnesota Twins	6	13	0.316	57	108
Total	32	44	0.421	274	333
National League
Chicago Cubs	3	3	0.500	18	17
Cincinnati Reds	2	1	0.667	16	15
Milwaukee Brewers	2	1	0.667	15	14
Pittsburgh Pirates	0	4	0.000	4	20
St. Louis Cardinals	2	2	0.500	16	13
Total	9	11	0.450	69	79
Season Total	76	86	0.469	622	701

Month	Games	Won	Lost	Win %	RS	RA
April	19	8	11	0.421	64	89
May	30	15	15	0.500	115	132
June	26	10	16	0.385	80	118
July	26	16	10	0.615	113	92
August	28	12	16	0.429	121	120
September	29	13	16	0.448	119	134
October	4	2	2	0.500	10	16
Total	162	76	86	0.469	622	701

	Games	Won	Lost	Win %	RS	RA
Home	81	40	41	0.494	290	338
Away	81	36	45	0.444	332	363
Total	162	76	86	0.469	622	701

=== Season ===
- On April 29, the Sox lost to Baltimore 8–2 at Camden Yards in the only game in MLB history played without fans allowed to attend. The two previous games in the series had been postponed due to riots in Baltimore, but the third could not be so easily rescheduled or relocated, so the Orioles decided not to admit fans since the police were too busy maintaining order elsewhere in the city to provide adequate security at the game.

== Game log ==
Legend
	White Sox win
	White Sox loss
	Postponement
**Bold**	White Sox team member

2015 White Sox game log
April (8–11) – Home (6–3) – Road (2–8) – 64 R.S. 89 R.A.

#	Date	Opponent	Time	Score	Win	Loss	Save	Record	Attendance	Streak/ Box
1	April 6	@ Royals	3:10 pm	1–10	Ventura (1–0)	**Samardzija** (0–1)	—	0–1	40,085	L1 Archived March 4, 2016, at the Wayback Machine
2	April 8	@ Royals	7:10 pm	5–7	Davis (1–0)	**Putnam** (0–1)	Holland (1)	0–2	23,385	L2 Archived March 3, 2016, at the Wayback Machine
3	April 9	@ Royals	1:10 pm	1–4	Vólquez (1–0)	**Danks** (0–1)	Holland (2)	0–3	20,236	L3 Archived March 4, 2016, at the Wayback Machine
4	April 10	Twins	3:10 pm	0–6	Milone (1−0)	**Noesí** (0−1)	Duensing (1)	0–4	38,533	L4 Archived March 4, 2016, at the Wayback Machine
5	April 11	Twins	1:10 pm	5–4	**Duke** (1−0)	Boyer (0−1)	**Robertson** (1)	1–4	22,317	W1 Archived March 4, 2016, at the Wayback Machine
6	April 12	Twins	1:10 pm	6–2	**Sale** (1−0)	Hughes (0−2)	—	2–4	23,057	W2 Archived March 4, 2016, at the Wayback Machine
7	April 14	@ Indians	6:10 pm	4–1	**Quintana** (1–0)	Carrasco (1–1)	**Robertson** (2)	3–4	10,642	W3 Archived April 27, 2015, at the Wayback Machine
8	April 15	@ Indians	11:10 pm	2–4	Bauer (2–0)	**Danks** (0–2)	Allen (2)	3–5	11,042	L1 Archived March 4, 2016, at the Wayback Machine
9	April 17	@ Tigers	12:08 pm	1–2	Soria (1–0)	**Duke** (1−1)	—	3–6	33,084	L2 Archived March 4, 2016, at the Wayback Machine
10	April 18	@ Tigers	12:08 pm	12–3	**Sale** (2−0)	Sánchez (1–2)	—	4–6	39,877	W1 Archived March 3, 2016, at the Wayback Machine
11	April 19	@ Tigers	12:08 pm	1–9	Greene (3–0)	**Quintana** (1–1)	—	4–7	30,357	L1
12	April 20	Indians	7:10 pm	4–3	**Robertson** (1–0)	Allen (0–2)	—	5–7	13,055	W1
13	April 21	Indians	7:10 pm	2–6	Carrasco (2–1)	**Noesí** (0–2)	—	5–8	14,032	L1
14	April 22	Indians	1:10 pm	6–0	**Samardzija** (1–1)	Kluber (0–2)	—	6–8	14,429	W1
15	April 23	Royals	7:10 pm	2–3 (13)	Morales (2–0)	**Petricka** (0–1)	Davis (4)	6–9	14,218	L1
(16)	April 24	Royals	7:10 pm	2–2 (8)	**Suspended (rain)** (Resumed: April 26)				20,350	(L1)
--	April 25	Royals	7:10 pm	**Postponed (rain)** (Rescheduled for July 17)						
16	April 26	Royals	1:10 pm	3–2*	**Robertson** (2–0)	Herrera (0–1)	—	7–9	23,317	W1
17	April 26	Royals	7:10 pm	5–3	**Danks** (1–2)	Vólquez (2–2)	**Robertson** (3)	8–9	23,317	W2
--	April 27	@ Orioles	6:05 pm	**Postponed (safety concerns due to 2015 Baltimore riots)** (Rescheduled for May 28)						
--	April 28	@ Orioles	6:05 pm	**Postponed (safety concerns due to 2015 Baltimore riots)** (Rescheduled for May 28)						
18	April 29	@ Orioles	1:05 pm	2–8	Jiménez (2–1)	**Samardzija** (1–2)	—	8–10	0	L1
19	April 30	@ Twins	7:10 pm	2–12	May (2–1)	**Sale** (2–1)	—	8–11	20,736	L2

May (15–15) – Home (6–7) – Road (9–8) – 115 R.S. 132 R.A.

#	Date	Opponent	Time	Score	Win	Loss	Save	Record	Attendance	Streak/ Box
20	May 1	@ Twins	7:10 pm	0–1	Gibson (2-2)	**Quintana** (1–2)	Perkins (7)	8–12	22,794	L3
21	May 2	@ Twins	1:10 pm	3–5	Nolasco (1-1)	**Noesí** (0–3)	Perkins (8)	8–13	30,551	L4
22	May 3	@ Twins	1:10 pm	3–13	Pressly (1–0)	**Danks** (1–3)	—	8–14	22,423	L5
23	May 5	Tigers	7:10 pm	5–2	**Samardzija** (2–2)	Greene (3–2)	**Robertson** (4)	9–14	16,351	W1
24	May 6	Tigers	7:10 pm	7–6	**Putnam** (1–1)	Chamberlain (0–1)	**Robertson** (5)	10–14	18,268	W2
25	May 7	Tigers	1:10 pm	1–4	Lobstein (3–2)	**Quintana** (1–3)	Soria (11)	10–15	20,081	L1
—	May 8	Reds	7:10 pm	**Postponed (rain)** (Rescheduled for May 9)						
26	May 9	Reds	3:10 pm	4–10	Cueto (3–3)	**Carroll** (0–1)	—	10–16	N/A	L2
27	May 9	Reds	Game 2	8–2	**Rodon** (1–0)	Marquis (3–2)	—	11–16	27,980	W1
28	May 10	Reds	1:10 pm	4–3	**Robertson** (3–0)	Chapman (1-1)	—	12–16	20,123	W2
29	May 11	@Brewers	6:20 pm	7–10	Broxton (1–0)	**Duke** (1–2)	Rodríguez (7)	12–17	29,886	L1
30	May 12	@Brewers	7:10 pm	4–2	**Sale** (3–1)	Blazek (3–1)	**Robertson** (6)	13–17	26,935	W1
31	May 13	@Brewers	7:10 pm	4–2	**Quintana** (2–3)	Nelson (1–4)	**Robertson** (7)	14–17	29,679	W2
32	May 15	@ Athletics	9:07 pm	7–6	**Carroll** (1–1)	Abad (0–2)	**Duke** (1)	15–17	21,464	W3
33	May 16	@ Athletics	6:07 pm	4–3	**Danks** (2–3)	Rodriguez (0–1)	**Robertson** (8)	16–17	28,445	W4
34	May 17	@ Athletics	3:07 pm	7–3	**Samardzija** (3–2)	Kazmir (2–2)	—	17–17	33,195	W5
35	May 18	Indians	7:10 pm	2–1 (10)	**Duke** (2-2)	McAllister (0–2)	—	18–17	17,712	W6
36	May 19	Indians	7:10 pm	1–3	Bauer (3–1)	**Quintana** (2–4)	Allen (7)	18–18	15,681	L1
37	May 20	Indians	7:10 pm	3–4	Marcum (1–0)	**Jennings** (0–1)	Allen (8)	18–19	15,146	L2
38	May 21	Indians	7:10 pm	2–5	Salazar (5–1)	**Danks** (2–4)	—	18–20	18,321	L3
39	May 22	Twins	7:10 pm	3–2	**Samardzija** (4–2)	Thompson (0–1)	**Robertson** (9)	19–20	21,067	W1
40	May 23	Twins	3:10 pm	3–4	May (3-3)	**Sale** (3–2)	Perkins (16)	19–21	38,714	L1
41	May 24	Twins	1:10 pm	1–8	Gibson (4–3)	**Quintana** (2–5)	—	19–22	30,180	L2
42	May 25	@ Blue Jays	6:07 pm	0–6	Hutchison (4–1)	**Noesí** (0–4)	—	19–23	15,168	L3
43	May 26	@ Blue Jays	6:07 pm	9–10	Delabar (1–0)	**Robertson** (3–1)	—	19–24	17,276	L4
44	May 27	@ Blue Jays	6:07 pm	5–3 (10)	**Robertson** (4–1)	Osuna (1–1)	—	20–24	15,463	W1
45	May 28	@ Orioles	4:05 pm	3–2	**Sale** (4–2)	Wilson (1–1)	**Petricka** (1)	21–24	18,441	W2
46	May 28	@ Orioles	2nd Game	3–6	Wright (2–0)	**Beck** (0–1)	Britton (13)	21–25	18,441	L1
47	May 29	@ Astros	7:10 pm	6–3	**Jennings** (1–1)	Fields (2–1)	**Robertson** (10)	22–25	25,957	W1
48	May 30	@ Astros	3:10 pm	0–3	Keuchel (7–1)	**Quintana** (2–6)	—	22–26	29,720	L1
49	May 31	@ Astros	1:10 pm	6–0	**Danks** (3–4)	Hernández (2–4)	—	23–26	27,423	W1

June (10–16) – Home (6–5) – Road (4–11) – 84 R.S. 123 R.A.

#	Date	Opponent	Time	Score	Win	Loss	Save	Record	Attendance	Streak/ Box
50	June 2	@ Rangers	7:05 pm	2–15	Lewis (5–0)	**Samardzija** (4–3)	—	23–27	27,558	L1
51	June 3	@ Rangers	7:05 pm	9–2	**Sale** (5–2)	Martinez (4–2)	—	24–27	32,598	W1
52	June 4	@ Rangers	7:05 pm	1–2 (11)	Scheppers (2–0)	**Jennings** (1–2)		24–28	27,616	L1
53	June 5	Tigers	7:10 pm	4–3 (11)	**Petricka** (1–1)	Wilson (1–2)		25–28	24,761	W1
54	June 6	Tigers	6:15 pm	1–7	Price (5–2)	**Danks** (3–5)	—	25–29	28,368	L1
55	June 7	Tigers	1:10 pm	4–6	Simón (6–3)	**Samardzija** (4–4)	Soria (16)	25–30	29,059	L2
56	June 8	Astros	7:10 pm	3–1	**Sale** (6–2)	McCullers (2–1)	**Robertson** (11)	26–30	17,352	W1
57	June 9	Astros	7:10 pm	4–2	**Rodon** (2–0)	Keuchel (7–2)	**Robertson** (12)	27–30	18,439	W2
58	June 10	Astros	7:10 pm	4–1	**Quintana** (3–6)	Sipp (2–3)	**Robertson** (13)	28–30	17,455	W3
59	June 12	@ Rays	6:10 pm	5–7	Andriese (1–1)	**Danks** (3–6)	McGee (2)	28–31	13,448	L1
60	June 13	@ Rays	3:10 pm	4–5	Boxberger (4–3)	**Putnam** (1–2)	McGee (3)	28–32	20,248	L2
61	June 14	@ Rays	12:10 pm	1–2	Riefenhauser (1–0)	**Sale** (6–3)	Jepsen (5)	28–33	17,962	L3
62	June 15	@ Pirates	6:05 pm	0–11	Liriano (4–5)	**Rodon** (2–1)	–	28–34	24,536	L4
63	June 16	@ Pirates	6:05 pm	0–3	Morton (5–0)	**Quintana** (3–7)	Melancon (21)	28–35	28,413	L5
64	June 17	Pirates	7:10 pm	2–3	Locke (4–3)	**Danks** (3–7)	Melancon (22)	28–36	19,194	L6
65	June 18	Pirates	7:10 pm	2–3	Cole (11–2)	**Petricka** (1–2)	Melancon (23)	28–37	21,296	L7
66	June 19	Rangers	7:10 pm	1–2	Lewis (7–3)	**Robertson** (4–2)	Tolleson (10)	28–38	22,864	L8
67	June 20	Rangers	1:10 pm	3–2	**Rodon** (3–1)	Martinez (5–3)	**Robertson** (14)	29–38	25,738	W1
68	June 21	Rangers	1:10 pm	3–2 (11)	**Petricka** (2–2)	Claudio (1–1)	—	30–38	33,668	W2
69	June 22	@ Twins	7:10 pm	2–13	Milone (4–1)	**Danks** (3–8)	—	30–39	24,094	L1
70	June 23	@ Twins	7:10 pm	6–2	**Samardzija** (5–4)	Pelfrey (5–4)	**Petricka** (2)	31–39	27,349	W1
71	June 24	@ Twins	12:10 pm	1–6	Hughes (6–6)	**Sale** (6–4)	—	31–40	28,854	L1
72	June 25	@ Tigers	12:08 pm	8–7 (10)	**Duke** (3–2)	Chamberlain (0–2)	**Robertson** (15)	32–40	40,355	W1
73	June 26	@ Tigers	6:08 pm	4–5	Rondon (1–0)	**Duke** (3-3)	Soria (17)	32–41	38,455	L1
—	June 27	@ Tigers	3:08 pm	**Postponed (rain)** (Rescheduled for September 21)						
74	June 28	@ Tigers	12:08 pm	4–5	Soria (3–0)	**Putnam** (1–3)	—	32–42	39,455	L2
75	June 30	@ Cardinals	7:10 pm	2–1 (11)	**Webb** (1–0)	Socolovich (2–1)	**Robertson** (16)	33–42	45,626	W1

July (16–10) – Home (6–8) – Road (10–2) – 113 R.S. 92 R.A.

#	Date	Opponent	Time	Score	Win	Loss	Save	Record	Attendance	Streak/ Box
76	July 1	@ Cardinals	7:15 pm	7–1	**Quintana** (4–7)	Lackey (6–5)	—	34–42	41,696	W2
77	July 3	Orioles	7:10 pm	1–0	**Danks** (4–8)	Jiménez (7–4)	**Robertson** (17)	35–42	27,384	W3
78	July 4	Orioles	1:10 pm	3–2	**Putnam** (2–3)	Norris (2–8)	**Robertson** (18)	36–42	22,559	W4
79	July 5	Orioles	1:10 pm	1–9	González (7–5)	**Rodon** (3–2)	—	36–43	22,519	L1
80	July 6	Blue Jays	7:10 pm	4–2	**Sale** (7–4)	Buehrle (9–5)	—	37–43	24,593	W1
81	July 7	Blue Jays	7:10 pm	1–2	Doubront (1–0)	**Quintana** (4–8)	Osuna (4)	37–44	17,028	L1
82	July 8	Blue Jays	7:10 pm	7–6 (11)	**Putnam** (3–3)	Osuna (1–3)	—	38–44	17,032	W1
83	July 9	Blue Jays	1:10 pm	2–0	**Samardzija** (6–4)	Dickey (3–10)	—	39–4	23,298	W2
84	July 10	@ Cubs	3:05 pm	1–0	**Petricka** (3–2)	Rondón (3–2)	**Robertson** (19)	40–44	41,580	W3
85	July 11	@ Cubs	3:05 pm	5–1	**Sale** (8–4)	Lester (4–8)	—	41–44	41,596	W4
86	July 12	@ Cubs	1:20 pm	1–3	Arrieta (10–5)	**Quintana** (4–9)	—	41–45	41,688	L1
ASG	July 14	All-Star Game @ Cincinnati, OH	7:05 pm	**AL**, 6–3	Price (AL, DET)	Kershaw (NL, LAD)			43,656	ASG
ASG	The White Sox were represented in the All-Star game by Chris Sale.									
87	July 17	Royals	1:10 pm	2–4	Young (8–5)	**Samardzija** (6–5)	Holland (20)	41–46	25,807	L2
88	July 17	Royals	7:10 pm	2–0	**Danks** (5–8)	Vólquez (8–5)	**Robertson** (20)	42–46	25,701	W1
89	July 18	Royals	1:10 pm	6–7 (13)	Finnegan (3–0)	**Jennings** (1–3)	Madson (1)	42–47	33,559	L1
90	July 19	Royals	1:10 pm	1–4	Duffy (4–4)	**Sale** (8–5)	Blanton (1)	42–48	32,175	L2
91	July 21	Cardinals	7:10 pm	5–8	Wacha (11–3)	**Rodon** (3–3)	Rosenthal (28)	42–49	29,728	L3
92	July 22	Cardinals	7:10 pm	1–2	Socolovich (4–1)	**Duke** (3–4)	Rosenthal (29)	42–50	30,046	L4
93	July 23	@ Indians	6:10 pm	8–1	**Samardzija** (7–5)	Bauer (8–7)	—	43–50	16,317	W1
94	July 24	@ Indians	6:10 pm	6–0	**Quintana** (5–9)	Kluber (5–11)	—	44–50	26,553	W2
95	July 25	@ Indians	6:10 pm	10–3	**Sale** (9–5)	Carrasco (10–8)	—	45–50	24,763	W3
96	July 26	@ Indians	12:10 pm	2–1	**Rodon** (4–3)	Salazar (8–6)	**Robertson** (21)	46–50	17,751	W4
97	July 27	@ Red Sox	6:10 pm	10–8	**Albers** (1–0)	Ross (0–1)	**Robertson** (22)	47–50	37,401	W5
98	July 28	@ Red Sox	6:10 pm	9–4	**Samardzija** (8–5)	Miley (8–9)	—	48–50	38,063	W6
99	July 29	@ Red Sox	6:10 pm	9–2	**Quintana** (6–9)	Porcello (5–11)	—	49–50	37,104	W7
100	July 30	@ Red Sox	6:10 pm	2–8	Wright (4–4)	**Sale** (9–6)	—	49–51	36,215	L1
101	July 31	Yankees	7:10 pm	6–13	Eovaldi (11–2)	**Rodon** (4–4)	—	49–52	30,359	L2

August (12–16) – Home (9–9) – Road (3–7) – 121 R.S. 120 R.A.

#	Date	Opponent	Time	Score	Win	Loss	Save	Record	Attendance	Streak/ Box
102	August 1	Yankees	6:10 pm	8–2	**Danks** (6–8)	Mitchell (0–1)	—	50–52	34,379	W1
103	August 2	Yankees	1:10 pm	3–12	Nova (4–3)	**Samardzija** (8–6)	—	50–53	38,840	L1
104	August 3	Rays	7:10 pm	4–5	McGee (1–1)	**Robertson** (4–3)	Boxberger (27)	50–54	16,496	L2
105	August 4	Rays	7:10 pm	3–11	Archer (10–8)	**Sale** (9–7)	—	50–55	18,499	L3
106	August 5	Rays	1:10 pm	6–5 (10)	**Robertson** (5–3)	Boxberger (4–7)	—	51–55	20,028	W1
107	August 7	@ Royals	7:10 pm	2–3	Volquez (4–7)	**Danks** (6–9)	Holland (24)	51–56	36,211	L1
108	August 8	@ Royals	6:10 pm	6–7	Guthrie (8–7)	**Samardzija** (8–7)	Holland (25)	51–57	39,302	L2
109	August 9	@ Royals	1:10 pm	4–5	Herrera (3–2)	**Petricka** (3–3)	Madson (2)	51–58	35,785	L3
110	August 10	Angels	7:10 pm	8–2	**Sale** (10–7)	Shoemaker (5–8)	—	52–58	20,036	W1
111	August 11	Angels	7:10 pm	3–0	**Rodon** (5–4)	Santiago (7–6)	**Robertson** (23)	53–58	17,137	W2
112	August 12	Angels	7:10 pm	3–2 (13)	**Albers** (2–0)	Ramos (2–1)	—	54–58	17,171	W3
113	August 14	Cubs	3:10 pm	5–6	Richard (3–0)	**Samardzija** (8–8)	Rondón (20)	54–59	36,386	L1
114	August 15	Cubs	6:10 pm	3–6	Arrieta (14–6)	**Quintana** (6–10)	Rondón (21)	54–60	39,579	L2
115	August 16	Cubs	1:10 pm	3–1	**Sale** (11–7)	Haren (8–8)	**Robertson** (24)	55–60	39,475	W1
116	August 17	@ Angels	9:05 pm	1–2	Salas (3–1)	**Rodon** (5–5)	Street (28)	55–61	36,431	L1
117	August 18	@ Angels	9:05 pm	3–5	Richards (12–9)	**Danks** (6–10)	Street (29)	55–62	37,114	L2
118	August 19	@ Angels	9:05 pm	0–1	Weaver (5–9)	**Samardzija** (8–9)	Smith (2)	55–63	35,036	L3
119	August 20	@ Angels	9:05 pm	8–2	**Quintana** (7–10)	Tropeano (1–2)	—	56–63	37,142	W1
120	August 21	@ Mariners	9:10 pm	11–4	**Sale** (12–7)	Hernández (14–8)	—	57–63	35,770	W2
121	August 22	@ Mariners	8:10 pm	6–3 (10)	**Jones** (1–0)	Farquhar (0–4)	**Robertson** (25)	58–63	32,085	W3
122	August 23	@ Mariners	3:10 pm	6–8	Walker (9–7)	**Danks** (6–11)	Wilhelmsen (3)	58–64	30,537	L1
123	August 24	Red Sox	7:10 pm	4–5	Kelly (7–6)	**Samardzija** (8–10)	Machi (2)	58–65	18,051	L2
124	August 25	Red Sox	7:10 pm	5–4	**Petricka** (4–3)	Miley (10–10)	**Robertson** (26)	59–65	14,393	W1
125	August 26	Red Sox	7:10 pm	0–3	Porcello (6–11)	**Jones** (1–1)	Tazawa (3)	59–66	17,812	L1
126	August 27	Mariners	7:10 pm	4–2	**Rodon** (6–5)	Elías (4–7)	**Robertson** (27)	60–66	15,076	W1
127	August 28	Mariners	7:10 pm	0–2	Walker (10–7)	**Danks** (6–12)	Wilhelmsen (5)	60–67	27,870	L1
128	August 29	Mariners	6:10 pm	6–7	Iwakuma (6–3)	**Samardzija** (8–11)	Wilhelmsen (6)	60–68	26,011	L2
129	August 30	Mariners	1:10 pm	6–5 (11)	**Robertson** (6–3)	Rollins (0–1)	—	61–68	28,031	W1

September (13–16) – Home (5–7) – Road (8–9) – 119 R.S. 134 R.A.

#	Date	Opponent	Time	Score	Win	Loss	Save	Record	Attendance	Streak/ Box
130	September 1	@ Twins	7:10 pm	6–8	Jepsen (3–6)	**Duke** (3–5)	Perkins (32)	61–69	25,803	L1
131	September 2	@ Twins	7:10 pm	0–3	Milone (7–4)	**Rodon** (6–6)	Jepsen (10)	61–70	22,162	L2
132	September 3	@ Twins	12:10 pm	6–4	**Samardzija** (9–11)	Fien (4–6)	**Robertson** (28)	62–70	25,339	W1
133	September 4	@ Royals	7:10 pm	12–1	**Danks** (7–12)	Medlen (3–1)	—	63–70	36,953	W2
134	September 5	@ Royals	6:10 pm	6–1	**Quintana** (8–10)	Duffy (7–7)	—	64–70	37,827	W3
135	September 6	@ Royals	1:10 pm	7–5	**Johnson** (1–0)	Cueto (9–11)	**Robertson** (29)	65–70	38,902	W4
136	September 7	Indians	1:10 pm	2–3	Bauer (11–11)	**Sale** (12–8)	Allen (29)	65–71	14,757	L1
137	September 8	Indians	7:10 pm	7–4	**Rodon** (7–6)	Carrasco (12–10)	—	66–71	11,990	W1
138	September 9	Indians	7:10 pm	4–6	Tomlin (5–1)	**Samardzija** (9–12)	Allen (30)	66–72	11,667	L1
139	September 11	Twins	7:10 pm	2–6	Santana (5–4)	**Jones** (1–2)	—	66–73	15,641	L2
140	September 12	Twins	6:10 pm	8–2	**Quintana** (9–10)	Milone (8–5)	—	67–73	26,065	W1
141	September 13	Twins	1:10 pm	0–7	Gibson (10–10)	**Sale** (12–9)	—	67–74	23,159	L1
142	September 14	Athletics	7:10 pm	8–7 (14)	**Jennings** (2–3)	León (0–2)	—	68–74	12,221	W1
143	September 15	Athletics	7:10 pm	6–17	Brooks (2–3)	**Samardzija** (9–13)	—	68–75	12,446	L1
144	September 16	Athletics	1:05 pm	9–4	**Johnson** (2–0)	Martin (2–5)	—	69–75	13,005	W1
145	September 17	Athletics	9:05 pm	2–4	Doolittle (1–0)	**Robertson** (6–4)	—	69–76	12,406	L1
146	September 18	@ Indians	6:10 pm	1–12	Anderson (5–3)	**Sale** (12–10)	—	69–77	16,149	L2
147	September 19	@ Indians	6:10 pm	4–3	**Rodon** (8–6)	Carrasco (13–11)	**Robertson** (30)	70–77	16,390	W1
148	September 20	@ Indians	12:10 pm	3–6	Tomlin (6–2)	**Danks** (7–13)	Allen (31)	70–78	13,282	L1
149	September 21	@ Tigers	12:08 pm	2–0	**Samardzija** (10–13)	Ryan (2–4)	—	71–78	34,175	
150	September 21	@ Tigers	6:08 pm	3–2	**Johnson** (3–0)	Wolf (0–4)	**Robertson** (31)	72–78	28,499	W2
151	September 22	@ Tigers	6:08 pm	1–2 (10)	Hardy (5–3)	**Duke** (3–6)	—	72–79	27,829	L1
152	September 23	@ Tigers	12:08 pm	4–7	Verlander (4–8)	**Montas** (0–1)	Feliz (8)	72–80	31,889	L2
153	September 24	@ Yankees	6:05 pm	2–3	Pineda (12–8)	**Sale** (12–11)	Miller (35)	72–81	35,132	L3
154	September 25	@ Yankees	6:05 pm	5–2	**Rodon** (9–6)	Sabathia (5–10)	**Robertson** (32)	73–81	37,316	W1
155	September 26	@ Yankees	3:05 pm	1–2	Warren (7–7)	**Danks** (7–14)	Miller (36)	73–82	39,134	L1
156	September 27	@ Yankees	12:05 pm	1–6	Severino (5–3)	**Johnson** (3–1)		73–83	38,690	L2
157	September 29	Royals	7:10 pm	4–2	**Samardzija** (11–13)	Cueto (10–13)	**Robertson** (33)	74–83	13,024	W1
158	September 30	Royals	7:10 pm	3–5	Morales (4–2)	**Robertson** (6–5)	Davis (15)	74–84	12,818	L1

October (2–2) – Home (2–2) – Road (0–0) – 10 R.S. 16 R.A.

#	Date	Opponent	Time	Score	Win	Loss	Save	Record	Attendance	Streak/ Box
159	October 1	Royals	7:10 pm	4–6	Medlen (6–2)	**Danks** (7–15)	Madson (3)	74–85	12,825	L2
160	October 2	Tigers	7:10 pm	2–1	**Sale** (13–11)	Simón (13–12)	**Robertson** (34)	75–85	18,030	W1
161	October 3	Tigers	6:10 pm	4–3	**Jones** (2–2)	Feliz (3–4)	–	76–85	17,772	W2
162	October 4	Tigers	2:10 pm	0–6	Norris (3–2)	**Montas** (0–2)	–	76–86	19,800	L1

== Personnel ==
=== Opening Day lineup ===
Opening Day Starters
Name	Pos.
Adam Eaton	CF
Melky Cabrera	LF
Jose Abreu	1B
Adam LaRoche	DH
Avisaíl García	RF
Alexei Ramírez	SS
Conor Gillaspie	3B
Tyler Flowers	C
Micah Johnson	2B
Jeff Samardzija	SP

== Roster ==
2015 Chicago White Sox
Roster
Pitchers: 34 Matt Albers; 54 Chris Beck; 67 Scott Carroll; 50 John Danks; 51 Kyle Drabek; 33 Zach Duke; 41 Javy Guerra; 63 Junior Guerra; 43 Dan Jennings; 45 Erik Johnson; 65 Nate Jones; 60 Frankie Montas; 48 Héctor Noesí; 52 Jake Petricka; 57 Zach Putnam; 62 José Quintana; 30 David Robertson; 55 Carlos Rodon; 49 Chris Sale; 29 Jeff Samardzija; 40 Daniel Webb	Catchers: 36 Rob Brantly; 21 Tyler Flowers; 58 Geovany Soto; Infielders: 79 José Abreu; 15 Gordon Beckham; 64 Emilio Bonifacio; 12 Conor Gillaspie; 7 Micah Johnson; 25 Adam LaRoche; 24 Mike Olt; 10 Alexei Ramírez; 18 Tyler Saladino; 5 Carlos Sánchez; Outfielders: 53 Melky Cabrera; 1 Adam Eaton; 26 Avisaíl García; 27 Leury García; 20 J. B. Shuck; 28 Trayce Thompson	Manager: 23 Robin Ventura; Coaches: 3 Harold Baines (assistant hitting); 32 Daryl Boston (first base); 99 Don Cooper (pitching); 31 Todd Steverson (hitting); 47 Joe McEwing (third base); 8 Mark Parent (bench); 59 Mark Salas (bullpen catcher); 37 Bobby Thigpen (bullpen)

== Statistics ==
=== Batting ===
Note: G = Games played; AB = At bats; R = Runs scored; H = Hits; 2B = Doubles; 3B = Triples; HR = Home runs; RBI = Runs batted in; BB = Base on balls; SO = Strikeouts; AVG = Batting average; SB = Stolen bases

Player	G	AB	R	H	2B	3B	HR	RBI	BB	SO	AVG	SB
José Abreu, 1B, DH	154	613	88	178	34	3	30	101	39	140	.290	0
Gordon Beckham, 3B, 2B, SS	100	211	24	44	8	0	6	20	19	43	.209	0
Emilio Bonifacio, 2B, OF	47	78	5	13	2	0	0	4	2	27	.167	1
Rob Brantly, C	14	33	3	4	1	0	1	6	2	8	.121	0
Melky Cabrera, LF	158	629	70	172	36	2	12	77	40	88	.273	3
Adam Eaton, CF	153	610	98	175	28	9	14	56	58	131	.287	18
Tyler Flowers, C	112	331	21	79	12	0	9	39	21	104	.239	0
Avisaíl García, RF	148	553	66	142	17	2	13	59	36	141	.257	7
Leury García, OF, 2B	18	14	0	3	0	0	0	1	1	7	.214	1
Conor Gillaspie, 3B	58	173	10	41	11	1	3	15	9	34	.237	0
Micah Johnson, 2B	36	100	10	23	4	0	0	4	9	30	.230	3
Adam LaRoche, DH, 1B	127	429	41	89	21	0	12	44	49	133	.207	0
Mike Olt, 3B, 1B	24	79	6	16	0	0	3	4	7	29	.203	0
José Quintana, P	32	8	0	0	0	0	0	0	0	5	.000	0
Alexei Ramírez, SS	154	583	54	145	33	0	10	62	31	68	.249	17
Carlos Rodon, P	26	1	0	0	0	0	0	0	0	1	.000	0
Tyler Saladino, 3B, SS	68	236	33	53	6	4	4	20	12	51	.225	8
Chris Sale, P	31	9	1	1	0	0	0	0	0	4	.111	0
Jeff Samardzija, P	32	2	0	1	0	0	0	0	0	1	.500	0
Carlos Sánchez, 2B	120	389	40	87	23	1	5	31	19	81	.224	2
J. B. Shuck, OF	79	143	15	38	8	2	0	15	16	16	.266	7
Geovany Soto, C	78	187	20	41	8	0	9	21	21	63	.219	0
Trayce Thompson, OF	44	122	17	36	8	3	5	16	13	26	.295	1
Team totals	162	5533	622	1381	260	27	136	595	404	1231	.250	68

=== Pitching ===
Note: W = Wins; L = Losses; ERA = Earned run average; G = Games pitched; GS = Games started; SV = Saves; IP = Innings pitched; H = Hits allowed; R = Runs allowed; ER = Earned runs allowed; HR = Home runs allowed; BB = Walks allowed; K = Strikeouts

Player	W	L	ERA	G	GS	SV	IP	H	R	ER	HR	BB	K
Matt Albers	2	0	1.21	30	0	0	37.1	31	6	5	3	9	28
Chris Beck	0	1	6.00	1	1	0	6.0	10	5	4	0	4	3
Scott Carroll	1	1	3.44	18	0	0	36.2	40	19	14	2	13	27
John Danks	7	15	4.71	30	30	0	177.2	195	104	93	24	56	124
Kyle Drabek	0	0	5.06	3	0	0	5.1	9	3	3	1	2	3
Zach Duke	3	6	3.41	71	0	1	60.2	47	26	23	9	32	66
Leury García	0	0	0.00	1	0	0	1.0	1	0	0	0	0	1
Javy Guerra	0	0	0.00	3	0	0	1.2	2	0	0	0	1	0
Junior Guerra	0	0	6.75	3	0	0	4.0	7	3	3	1	1	3
Dan Jennings	2	3	3.99	53	0	0	56.1	55	28	25	3	24	46
Erik Johnson	3	1	3.34	6	6	0	35.0	32	14	13	8	17	30
Nate Jones	2	2	3.32	19	0	0	19.0	12	7	7	5	6	27
Adam LaRoche	0	0	0.00	1	0	0	1.0	0	0	0	0	0	1
Frankie Montas	0	2	4.80	7	2	0	15.0	14	8	8	1	9	20
Héctor Noesí	0	4	6.89	10	5	0	32.2	41	26	25	7	17	22
Jake Petricka	4	3	3.63	62	0	2	52.0	56	21	21	2	18	33
Zach Putnam	3	3	4.07	49	0	0	48.2	42	24	22	7	24	64
José Quintana	9	10	3.36	32	32	0	206.1	218	81	77	16	44	177
Alexei Ramírez	0	0	0.00	1	0	0	1.0	1	0	0	0	0	0
David Robertson	6	5	3.41	60	0	34	63.1	46	27	24	7	13	86
Carlos Rodon	9	6	3.75	26	23	0	139.1	130	63	58	11	71	139
Chris Sale	13	11	3.41	31	31	0	208.2	185	88	77	23	42	274
Jeff Samardzija	10	13	4.96	32	32	0	214.0	228	122	118	29	49	163
Daniel Webb	1	0	6.30	27	0	0	30.0	41	26	21	3	22	22
Team totals	76	86	3.98	162	162	37	1452.2	1443	701	643	162	474	1359

== Farm system ==
Level	Team	League	Manager
AAA	Charlotte Knights	International League	Joel Skinner
AA	Birmingham Barons	Southern League	Julio Vinas
A-Advanced	Winston-Salem Dash	Carolina League	Tim Esmay
A	Kannapolis Intimidators	South Atlantic League	Tommy Thompson
Rookie	Great Falls Voyagers	Pioneer League	Cole Armstrong
Rookie	AZL White Sox	Arizona League	Mike Gellinger
Rookie	DSL White Sox	Dominican Summer League	Julio Valdez

LEAGUE CHAMPIONS: AZL White Sox
