= Kennys Vargas =

Puerto Rican baseball player (born 1990)

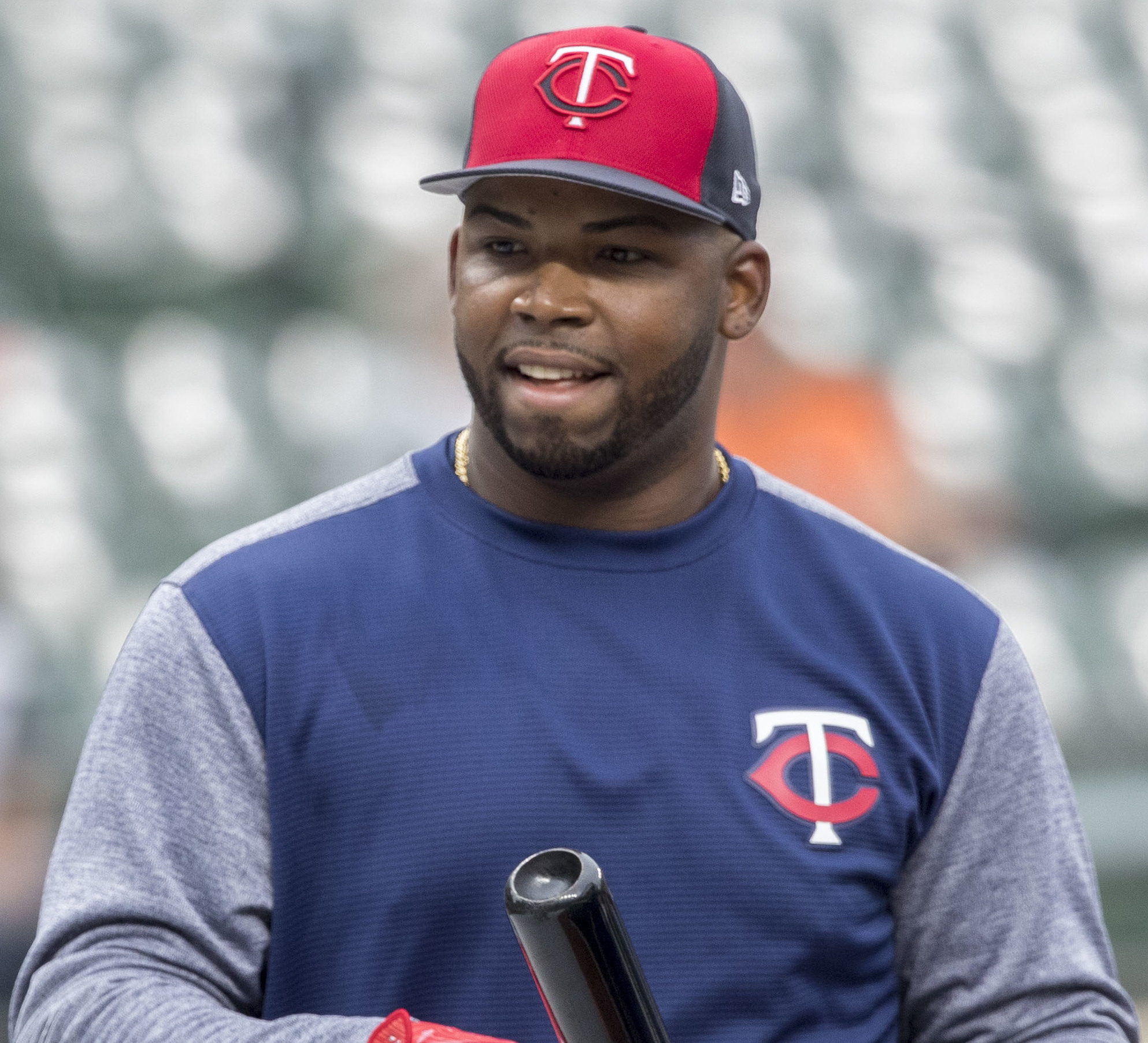
- Vargas with the Minnesota Twins in 2017

Staten Island FerryHawks
- Designated hitter / First baseman
- Born: August 1, 1990 (age 36); Canóvanas, Puerto Rico
- Bats: Switch Throws: Right

Professional debut
- MLB: August 1, 2014, for the Minnesota Twins
- NPB: March 29, 2019, for the Chiba Lotte Marines

MLB statistics (through 2017 season)
- Batting average: .252
- Home runs: 35
- Runs batted in: 116

NPB statistics (through 2019 season)
- Batting average: .179
- Home runs: 1
- Runs batted in: 6
- Stats at Baseball Reference

Teams
- Minnesota Twins (2014–2017); Chiba Lotte Marines (2019)
Medals
Men's baseball
Representing Puerto Rico
World Baseball Classic
Silver medal – second place	2017 Los Angeles	Team

Kennys Vargas Gautier (born August 1, 1990), nicknamed "Gorilla", is a Puerto Rican professional baseball designated hitter and first baseman for the Staten Island FerryHawks of the Atlantic League of Professional Baseball. He has previously played in Major League Baseball (MLB) for the Minnesota Twins, and in Nippon Professional Baseball (NPB) for the Chiba Lotte Marines.

Vargas has been compared to David Ortiz due to their similarities in size. Vargas stands 6 ft 5 in (1.96 m) tall and weighs about 275 pounds.

== Early life ==
Vargas was born in the municipality of Canóvanas, already being larger than the average local population with a length of 22 and a half inches and a weight of ten pounds. He was raised by his mother, teacher Elsa Gautier, who was divorced by the time that he was three years old and was left in charge of all his sustenance. During his youth, the family lived near a baseball park, where he joined his brother Jeronys and learned the game by the time that he was four. After beginning in the district of Río Piedras, Vargas continued playing in his native Canóvanas. Due to his size, he also played basketball during his school years, but at the urging of his mother (who saw potential for him to go professional) he selected baseball. In the process, Vargas declined an invitation to a major high school basketball tournament in 10th grade. Now invested in developing as a baseball player, he requested a trip to watch the New York Yankees play for his 15th birthday. After going undrafted in the 2008 Major League Baseball draft, Vargas decided to enroll in an independent baseball academy in the Dominican Republic, where he spent the following months until the Minnesota Twins invited him to an evaluation. In February 2009, the organization signed him as an amateur free agent with a signing bonus that neared $100,000.

== Career ==
=== Minnesota Twins ===
Vargas made his professional debut in 2009 with the rookie-level Gulf Coast League Twins. He also played for the GCL Twins in 2010. Vargas played the 2011 season with the Elizabethton Twins. Vargas was hitting .322/.377/.489 with six home runs over 44 games, when he was suspended 50 games for a violation of the Minor League Drug Prevention and Treatment Program. After his suspension was over in 2012 he played for the Beloit Snappers. In 41 games, Vargas had 11 home runs and a 1.030 on-base plus slugging (OPS). Vargas played for the Fort Myers Miracle in 2013; in 125 games he hit 19 home runs. Vargas was added to the Twins' 40-man roster on November 20, 2013, in order to protected from the Rule 5 draft. Vargas started the 2014 season with the Double-A New Britain Rock Cats. In July he played in the All-Star Futures Game.

Vargas made his MLB debut on August 1, 2014, and hit his first career home run off Jesse Hahn five days later, on August 6, leading the Twins to a 3–1 victory over the Padres. Vargas wound up finishing the season as the Twins designated hitter, slashing .274/.316/.456 with nine home runs with 38 RBI across 53 games.

In the 2015 season, Vargas began the season as the Twins' designated hitter although he was sent down a month later after a poor start. He was recalled later in the season. In 58 total appearances for Minnesota on the year, Vargas batted .240/.277/.349 with five home runs and 17 RBI.

Vargas was named the American League's Player of the Week for the week of July 4 to July 10, 2016. After excelling at the Triple–A level, Vargas was given another shot for extended playing time for the Twins. He split time between designated hitter and first base. Vargas ultimately played in 47 games for the Twins, posting a .230/.333/.500 batting line with 10 home runs and 20 RBI.

In 2017, Vargas started the season in Triple-A, but was once again called up at the end of April. In the offseason he trained alongside former major League players Carlos Delgado, José ‘Tony’ Valentín, and Manny Ramírez. He also played again with the Indios de Mayagüez in the Liga de Béisbol Profesional Roberto Clemente, Puerto Rico's baseball professional league. Vargas made 78 appearances for Minnesota during the year, slashing .253/.314/.444 with career-highs in home runs (11) and RBI (41).

On March 16, 2018, Vargas was designated for assignment by the Twins following the acquisition of Jake Cave. On March 22, Vargas was claimed off waivers by the Cincinnati Reds. On March 24, the Twins re-acquired Vargas by claiming him off waivers from the Reds, without Vargas appearing in an MLB game with the Reds. On March 27, he was removed from the 40-man roster and sent outright to the Triple-A Rochester Red Wings. In 130 games for Rochester, Vargas batted .240/.326/.425 with 21 home runs and 73 RBI. He elected free agency following the season on November 2.

=== Chiba Lotte Marines ===
On November 6, 2018, Vargas signed with the Chiba Lotte Marines of Nippon Professional Baseball (NPB). In 35 appearances for the Marines in 2019, Vargas hit .179/.324/.274 with one home run and six RBI. On November 30, 2019, the Marines announced that the team would not sign Vargas for the 2020 season. Two days later, he became a free agent.

=== Detroit Tigers ===
On January 27, 2020, Vargas signed a minor league contract with the Detroit Tigers. He did not play in a game in 2020 due to the cancellation of the minor league season because of the COVID-19 pandemic. Vargas was released by the Tigers organization on July 7.

=== Mexican League ===
On March 6, 2021, Vargas signed with the Saraperos de Saltillo of the Mexican League. In 66 games for Saltillo, he batted .310/.418/.603 with 18 home runs and 54 RBI. Vargas was released on February 10, 2022.

On February 15, 2022, Vargas signed with the Tecolotes de los Dos Laredos of the Mexican League. Vargas appeared in 85 games for Dos Laredos in 2022, slashing .324/.462/.566 with 17 home runs and 65 RBI. In 2023, Vargas appeared in 30 games, batting .270/.356/.461 with five home runs and 15 RBI.

On June 5, 2023, Vargas was traded to the Mariachis de Guadalajara of the Mexican League. In 50 games for Guadalajara, Vargas batted .297/.367/.550 with 11 home runs and 32 RBI.

On December 21, 2023, Vargas signed with the Tecolotes de los Dos Laredos of the Mexican League. In 88 appearances for Dos Laredos in 2024, he slashed .316/.416/.517 with 15 home runs and 80 RBI. Vargas was released by the Tecolotes on April 16, 2025.

On May 3, 2025, Vargas signed with the Acereros de Monclova of the Mexican League. In 53 games, he batted .319/.458/.681 with 13 home runs and 29 RBI. Vargas became a free agent following the season.

On February 3, 2026, Vargas signed with the Tecolotes de los Dos Laredos of the Mexican League. He made six appearances for the Tecolotes, batting .263/.300/.316 with one RBI. Vargas was released by Dos Laredos on April 27.

On May 25, 2026, Vargas signed with the Tigres de Quintana Roo of the Mexican League. In 36 appearances for the Tigres, he slashed .228/.288/.298 with two home runs and 10 RBI. On July 16, Vargas was released by Quintana Roo.

=== Staten Island FerryHawks ===
On August 7, 2026, Vargas signed with the Staten Island FerryHawks of the Atlantic League of Professional Baseball.

== International career ==
Vargas played for the Puerto Rico national baseball team in the 2017 World Baseball Classic where he won a silver medal.
