= J. R. Graham =

American baseball player (born 1990)

J.R. Graham
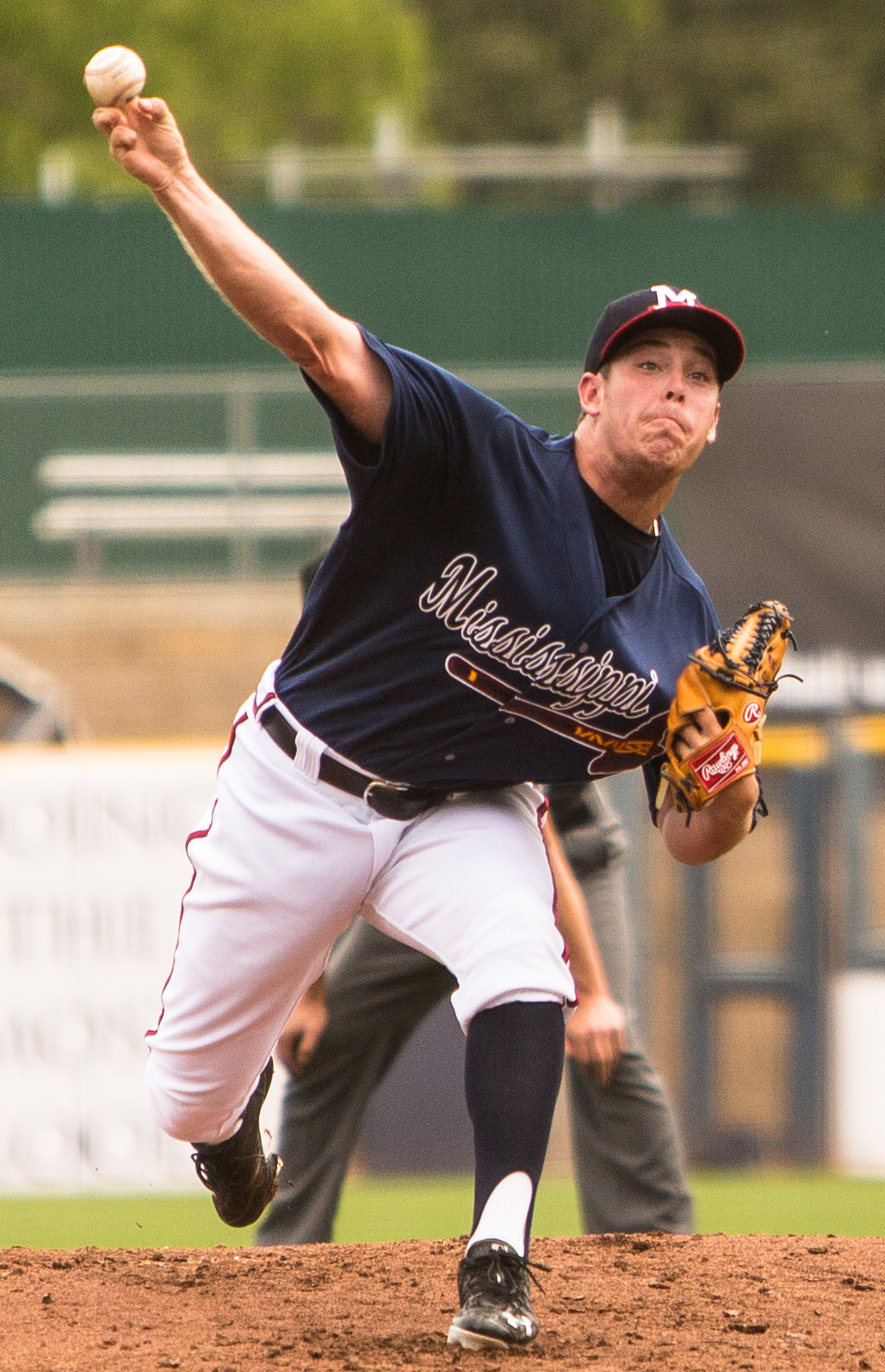
- Graham with the Mississippi Braves
- Pitcher
- Born: January 14, 1990 (age 36); Livermore, California, U.S.
- Batted: Right Threw: Right

MLB debut
- April 6, 2015, for the Minnesota Twins

Last MLB appearance
- May 4, 2016, for the Minnesota Twins

MLB statistics
- Win–loss record: 1-1
- Earned run average: 5.10
- Strikeouts: 55
- Stats at Baseball Reference

Teams
- Minnesota Twins (2015–2016)

Johnathan Ryan Graham (born January 14, 1990) is an American former professional baseball pitcher. He played in Major League Baseball (MLB) for the Minnesota Twins from 2015 to 2016.

== Amateur career ==
Graham was born in Livermore, California, on January 14, 1990, to Brian and Julie Graham. His mother Julie is legally blind due to the effects of Best disease, and when Graham started Little League as a shortstop, he wore white cleats instead of black ones at his father's suggestion and to help him stand out on the diamond. Graham dropped the different colored cleats and began wearing stirrups at age twelve or thirteen. He pitched and played shortstop while in high school.

== Professional career ==
=== Atlanta Braves ===
Graham was drafted by the Oakland Athletics in the 46th round of the 2008 Major League Baseball draft out of Livermore High School in Livermore, California. He did not sign, choosing instead to attend Santa Clara University, where he began pitching full-time. He was then drafted by the Atlanta Braves in the fourth round of the 2011 Major League Baseball draft.

Graham pitched for the Lynchburg Hillcats of the Low–A Carolina League and the Mississippi Braves of the Double–A Southern League in 2012 and 2013. He went 12–2 with a 2.80 earned run average and 110 strikeouts in 148 innings pitched. Prior to the 2013 season, Baseball America ranked Graham as the 93rd best prospect in baseball.

=== Minnesota Twins ===
On December 10, 2014, at the Winter Meetings, the Minnesota Twins selected Graham from the Braves in the Rule 5 draft. Graham made his major league debut on April 6, 2015, pitching two scoreless innings in relief of Phil Hughes against the Detroit Tigers.

In preparation for the 2016 season, Graham lost 40 pounds over the offseason, going from 210 pounds (95 kg) to 170 pounds (77 kg). Graham was designated for assignment by the Twins on May 6, 2016.

=== New York Yankees ===
On May 14, 2016, the Twins traded Graham to the New York Yankees in exchange for a player to be named later or cash considerations. He spent the 2016 season with the Trenton Thunder of the Double–A Eastern League, Scranton/Wilkes-Barre RailRiders of the Triple–A International League, and Low–A Staten Island Yankees. In 17 games for Trenton, Graham compiled a 1.82 ERA with 33 strikeouts and 5 saves. He made four appearances outside of Trenton, allowing no runs with 7 strikeouts for Scranton and Staten Island. The Yankees removed Graham from the 40–man roster and outrighted him to Scranton/Wilkes-Barre on September 26.

Graham spent the 2017 campaign with Scranton and Trenton, accumulating a 4.55 ERA with 32 strikeouts and 2 saves across 29 2/3 innings pitched. He was released by the Yankees organization on January 21, 2018.

== See also ==
- Rule 5 draft results
