= Kyle Gibson =

American baseball player (born 1987)

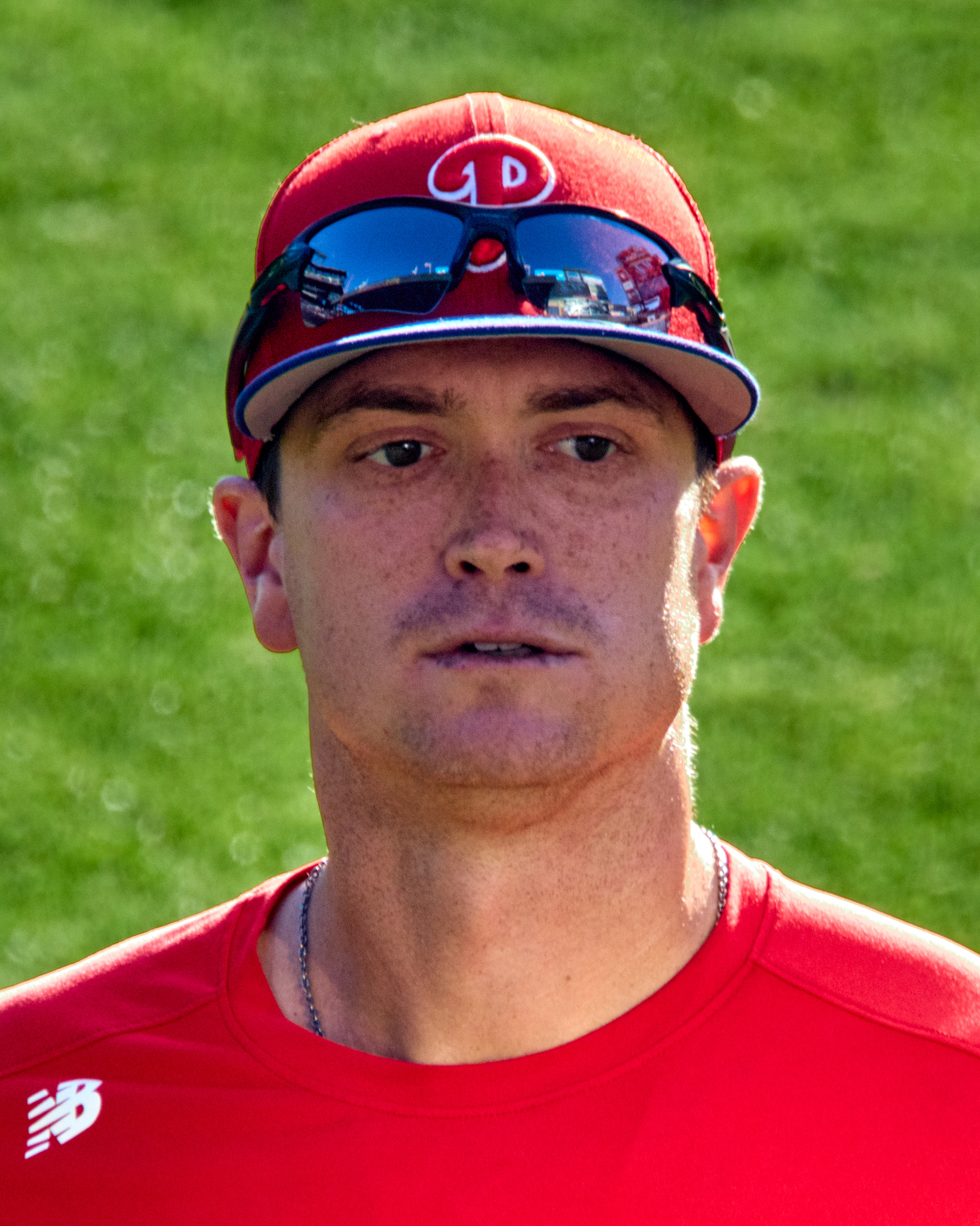
- Gibson with the Phillies in 2022
- Pitcher
- Born: October 23, 1987 (age 39); Greenfield, Indiana, U.S.
- Batted: Right Threw: Right

MLB debut
- June 29, 2013, for the Minnesota Twins

Last MLB appearance
- May 17, 2025, for the Baltimore Orioles

MLB statistics
- Win–loss record: 112–111
- Earned run average: 4.60
- Strikeouts: 1,520
- Stats at Baseball Reference

Teams
- Minnesota Twins (2013–2019); Texas Rangers (2020–2021); Philadelphia Phillies (2021–2022); Baltimore Orioles (2023); St. Louis Cardinals (2024); Baltimore Orioles (2025)

Career highlights and awards
- All-Star (2021)
Medals
Baseball
Representing United States
World University Championship
Gold medal – first place	2008 Brno	National team

Kyle Benjamin Gibson (born October 23, 1987) is an American former professional baseball pitcher. He played in Major League Baseball (MLB) for the Minnesota Twins, Texas Rangers, Philadelphia Phillies, Baltimore Orioles, and St. Louis Cardinals. Gibson played college baseball for the Missouri Tigers. He was selected by the Twins in the first round of the 2009 MLB draft, and made his MLB debut in 2013.

== Early life ==
Gibson was born in Greenfield, Indiana, to Harold and Sharon Gibson. He has a sister named Holly.

Between his freshman and sophomore years of high school, Gibson transferred from Cathedral High School in Indianapolis to Greenfield-Central High School; as a result, the Indiana High School Athletic Association (IHSAA) ruled that he could not play for Greenfield-Central's high school baseball team for one season.

During his junior year, he was 7–2 and led the Cougars to a sectional championship and to the regional final. In his senior year, he was 8–6 with a 0.98 ERA and 140 strikeouts. He led Greenfield to the Elite Eight by pitching all of his team's tournament games. He was named the Hancock County Player of the Year after his senior year. He was also named to the Indianapolis Star All-East team in both his junior and senior years. After his senior year, he was named All-East Player of the Year and made the Indiana All-Star Team.

== College career ==
The Philadelphia Phillies of Major League Baseball (MLB) selected Gibson in the 36th round of the 2006 MLB draft, but he chose not to sign. Instead, he opted to play college baseball for the Missouri Tigers, serving as the No. 2 starter behind Aaron Crow. In 2007, he played collegiate summer baseball with the Falmouth Commodores of the Cape Cod Baseball League and was named a league all-star.

== Professional career ==
=== Minnesota Twins ===
==== Minor leagues ====
Despite worries that a stress fracture to his elbow would negatively impact his chances in the 2009 MLB draft, the Minnesota Twins selected Gibson in the first round, 22nd overall after receiving the all-clear from the team's doctor. Negotiations for Gibson's signing bonus forced his decision to sign with the team into the final hour before the August 16 deadline, with Gibson ultimately agreeing to sign with the team for a bonus of $1.85 million. The stress fracture pushed Gibson's professional baseball debut back to the beginning of the 2010 season, when he was assigned to the High-A Fort Myers Miracle of the Florida State League. In seven starts with Fort Myers, Gibson posted a 4–1 record and a 1.87 ERA, striking out 40 batters in 43 2/3 innings of work.

Gibson's stint with the Miracle was short-lived: on May 11, he was promoted to the Double-A New Britain Rock Cats in order to clear room on the Fort Myers 25-man roster for new pitchers Loek van Mil and Andrei Lobanov. After winning his first three Double-A starts and building a strikeout-to-walk ratio of 3.17 in his first month and a half with his new team, Gibson was one of three Rock Cats players selected to appear at the 2010 Eastern League All-Star Game that July. Gibson put up a 7–5 record at New Britain, with a 3.68 ERA in 16 starts and 77 strikeouts in 93 innings, before he received another promotion to the Triple-A Rochester Red Wings on August 11. He had been called up to replace Jeff Manship, who had been promoted to the major leagues as a fill-in for the injured José Mijares. Twins minor league director Jim Rantz informed reporters that there was no intention of promoting Gibson beyond Rochester during the 2010 season, as the team wanted to shut him down after 150–160 innings, and he had already pitched 136 1/3 between Fort Myers and New Britain. He was shut down on August 25 in order to preserve his forearm for future seasons. At the time, Gibson had gone 0–0 with a 1.72 ERA in three Triple-A starts, giving him a combined 11–6 record and 2.96 ERA for the year. He had pitched a total of 152 innings, with 126 strikeouts and 39 walks, and had been placed on the disabled list with a sprained ankle.

Going into the 2011 season as Baseball America's top-ranked prospect with in the Twins organization, Gibson received an invitation to spring training. He was assigned to Rochester for the season, where he seemed to experience a sophomore slump: Gibson did not win a game for the Red Wings after May 29, and was 3–8 with a 4.81 ERA when he was placed on the disabled list at the start of August with an elbow injury. After a non-surgical rehabilitation program did not improve his health, Gibson underwent Tommy John surgery to repair his ulnar collateral ligament. He returned to the mound in 2012, pitching a series of rehab assignments for the Twins' lower-level affiliates before returning to Rochester on August 22, 2012, for the final two weeks of the International League season. In two starts at the end of the season, Gibson went 0–2 with a 9.45 ERA, striking out 10 batters in 6 2/3 innings. He continued his rehabilitation process in the Arizona Fall League, where he finished 3–2 with a 5.40 ERA, striking out 28 batters and allowing 31 hits in 23 1/3 innings. Gibson opened the 2013 season in Rochester, with Twins management anticipating that he would make his MLB debut sometime that season.

==== Major leagues ====
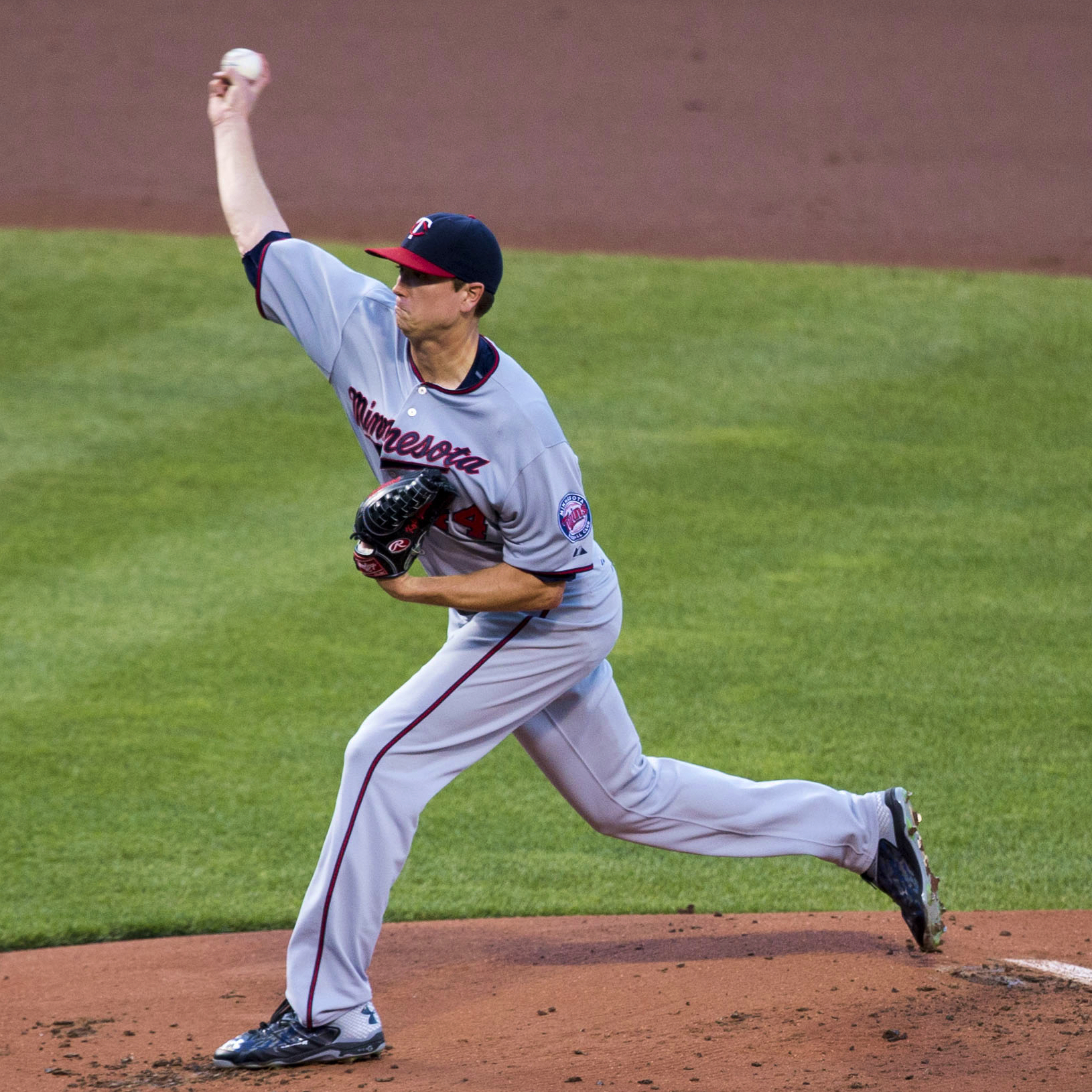
Gibson pitching for the Minnesota Twins in 2015

The Twins called Gibson up to the major leagues on June 25, 2013, after starting pitcher Mike Pelfrey suffered a back injury that placed him on the disabled list. At the time, he was the ninth pitcher to start a game for Minnesota during the 2013 MLB season, and his promotion offered a path to remain in the majors for the remainder of the year. Gibson was credited with the win in his MLB debut, allowing two runs and eight hits while striking out five batters in six innings on June 29. The Twins defeated the Kansas City Royals 6–2. His success did not continue past that debut, as Gibson struggled to strike out batters in his future starts. After posting a 2–4 record and a 6.53 ERA with 29 strikeouts in 10 starts and 51 innings, Gibson was optioned back to Rochester on August 19. In his final major league start of the season, he gave up four runs on 10 hits in only 3 2/3 innings. While he was sent back to Triple A to work on his pitch command, Twins manager Ron Gardenhire took the time to analyze how many innings Gibson had already pitched and to develop a plan for the remainder of the season. He was shut down for the season on September 2, after pitching a combined 152 2/3 innings between Rochester and Minnesota, with the expectation that he would compete for a Twins starting rotation position the following spring.

The Twins spent the 2013–14 offseason retooling their pitching rotation, spending approximately $84 million on signing new pitchers during the free agency period and giving Gibson an upwards battle for a major league position on Opening Day. He proceeded to outbattle Scott Diamond, Vance Worley, and Samuel Deduno during spring training, posting a 2.70 ERA in four starts. Gibson was named the No. 5 starter, while Deduno was sent to the bullpen and Worley was sent to Rochester. He emerged as an early ace, posting an ERA of only 0.93 after his first three starts, including a scoreless eight-inning performance against the Toronto Blue Jays in 31 °F (−1 °C) weather. He did not allow a home run in a game until May 10, when he gave up a three-run home run to Miguel Cabrera of the Detroit Tigers; Gibson lasted only two innings in that game, giving up six runs in the process. Gibson recorded his first MLB hit as a batter on June 2, a fifth-inning single against Matt Garza in a 6–2 loss to the Milwaukee Brewers. Gibson remained in the rotation for the season, finishing with a 13–12 record and a 4.47 ERA in 31 starts. He additionally struck out 107 batters in 179 1/3 innings. He led the team in innings, in wins and bettered his ERA from 4.47 to 3.84 in 2015.

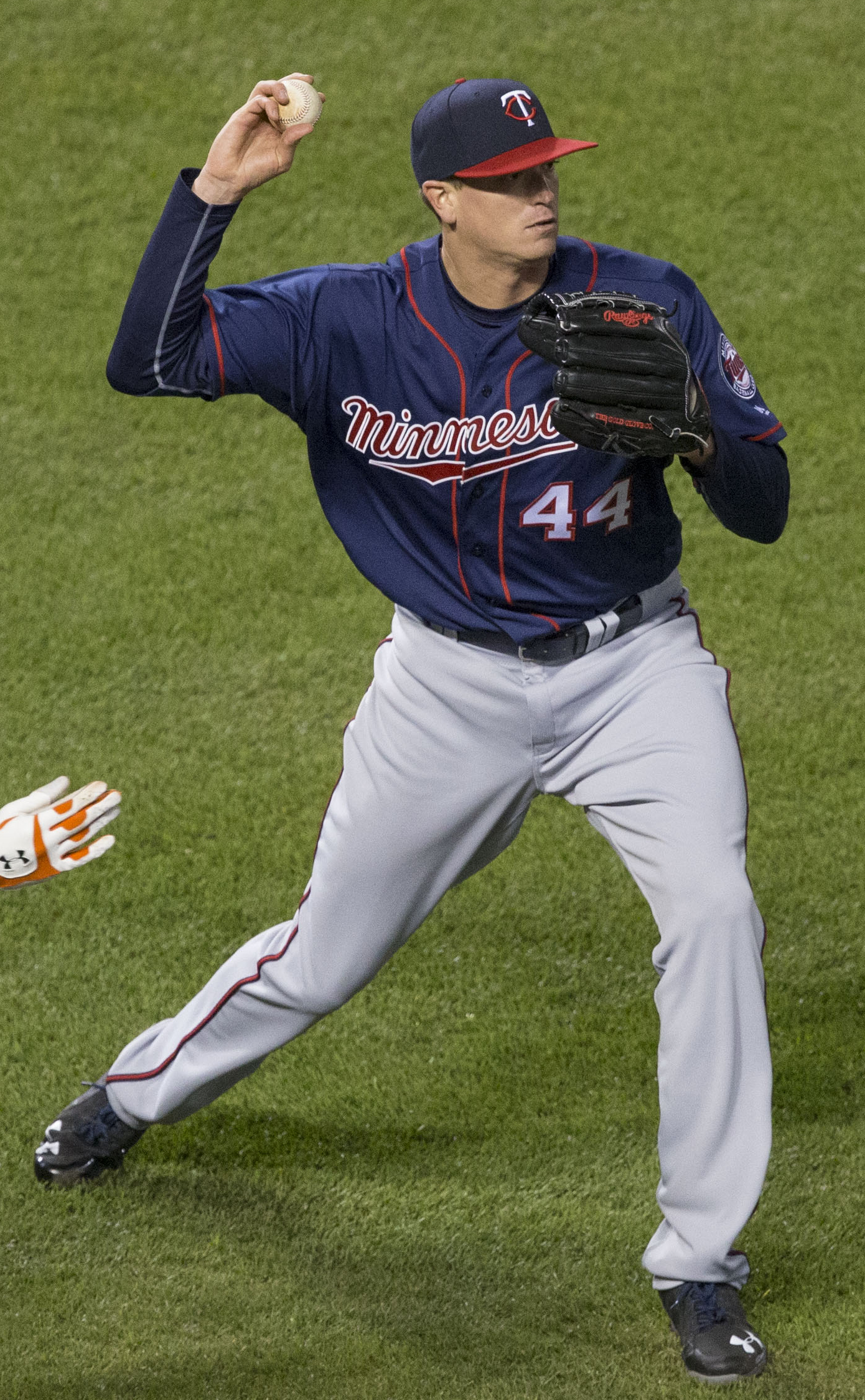
Gibson with the Twins in 2015

Gibson opened the 2016 season as the Twins' No. 2 starter, behind ace Ervin Santana. Both pitchers were placed on the 15-day disabled list on April 26, Santana with a lower back strain and Gibson with a right shoulder strain. He was meant to return on June 2, but began to experience back pain during his rehab assignment and had to be scratched from his scheduled start. Gibson was reinstated to the active roster on June 10, and he picked up his first win of the season on June 28, pitching seven innings of the Twins' 4–0 shutout against the Chicago White Sox. After struggling with stamina in a stretch of seven starts, Gibson pitched his first complete game victory on August 17, giving up only three runs on eight hits in a 10–3 victory over the Atlanta Braves. Because the Twins were playing a National League team at their home, Gibson also needed to bat in the game, and he became the first Minnesota pitcher to make five plate appearances in a game since Johan Santana in 2007. He went 6–11 for the year, with a 5.07 ERA and 104 strikeouts in 25 starts and 147 1/3 innings.

After a difficult start to the 2017 season, going 0–4 with an 8.20 ERA in his first six starts, Gibson was optioned to Rochester on May 4. Gibson understood why he was sent down, telling reporters, "I don't know that I've had a more frustrating stretch that I can even remember" during his baseball career. His minor-league stint was short-lived, as an injury to Phil Hughes forced the Twins to call Gibson back up on May 22. He continued to struggle in Minnesota, and when the Twins received former Braves pitcher Jaime García at the trade deadline, Gibson was optioned to Rochester for a second time to make room for Garcia in the rotation. Twins manager Paul Molitor said that the decision to send Gibson to Triple-A would keep him available should there be an issue in the Twins' rotation; if he had been sent to the bullpen, he could not be asked to make a start as easily.

He compiled the same ERA in 2017, but with 12 wins, and hitters again hit over .290 against him. In 2018, he entered the Twins’ rotation again and started achieving a career-high strikeout rate than before — as of June 2018, he had struck out 66 batters in just 63 innings. Gibson finished the season with a record of 10–13 in 196 2/3 innings. He led the team in ERA, finishing with a 3.62 ERA and a career high 179 strikeouts. He slotted 2nd in the Twins rotation in 2019. Gibson's K/9 rose to a career high 9 despite registering an ERA of 4.84 in 160 innings. Gibson tied a career high in wins with 13.

=== Texas Rangers ===
A free agent after the 2019 season, Gibson signed a three-year, $28 million contract with the Texas Rangers on December 6, 2019. Because of his ulcerative colitis diagnosis, Gibson was considered "high risk" for COVID-19, and was given the option to opt out of the 2020 MLB season while receiving a full pro-rated salary. After discussion with his wife and gastroenterologist, he decided to play the season and limit his non-baseball outings. The 60-game season was ultimately the worst of Gibson's career as he went 2–6 with a 5.35 ERA, a 1.53 WHIP, and a 5.39 fielding independent pitching (FIP). After picking up his first win of the season on August 15, Gibson did not win again until he pitched a complete game shutout against the Houston Astros on September 17. Prior to the shutout, the Rangers staff had isolated a mechanical issue when Gibson was pitching from the stretch, which he responded to by narrowing his stance. Gibson and the rest of the Rangers' starting rotation remained healthy throughout the shortened season, but saw low inning counts: Gibson was second on the team with 67 1/3 innings pitched, while his rotation mate Lance Lynn led MLB with 84.

Gibson was tapped for his first career Opening Day start in 2021, where he was pulled after only one out after giving up five earned runs to the Kansas City Royals and briefly lifting his ERA to 135.00. His opening day outing proved to be a fluke, as Gibson's ERA over his next five starts was only 0.82, and he did not allow a single home run in the month of April. After leading the AL with a 1.98 ERA and a 6–0 record through his first 16 starts, Gibson received his first All-Star Game selection in 2021, joining his Rangers teammates Joey Gallo and Adolis García. For the season with Texas, he was 6–3 with a 2.87 ERA and 94 strikeouts over 113 innings.

=== Philadelphia Phillies ===
On July 30, 2021, Gibson was traded to the Philadelphia Phillies along with Ian Kennedy, Hans Crouse, and cash considerations in exchange for Spencer Howard, Kevin Gowdy, and Josh Gessner. He recorded his 1,000th career strikeout in his Phillies debut on August 1, fanning Michael Pérez of the Pittsburgh Pirates in the fifth inning of a 15–4 Phillies rout. Gibson hit his only major league home run in a game against the Pirates on September 24. This would be the final home run by a Phillies pitcher before the National League adopted the designated hitter the following season.

During a game in July 2022 against the Cardinals, he gave up home runs to four consecutive batters in the 1st inning with two outs. He was the 7th pitcher to do so in MLB history.

In 2022, Gibson was 10–8 with a 5.05 ERA and 144 strikeouts in 167 2/3 innings pitched across 31 starts. He gave up 24 home runs, 10th-most in the NL.

=== Baltimore Orioles ===
On December 5, 2022, Gibson signed a one-year contract with the Baltimore Orioles. He achieved the 100th win of his MLB career in a 7–3 victory over the New York Mets at Camden Yards on August 5, 2023. In 2023, Gibson was 15-9 (his 15 wins were third in the league) with a 4.73 ERA and 157 strikeouts in a league-leading 33 starts over 192 innings (6th in the league), as he had the second-best range factor per 9 innings of all pitchers in the league (1.55). He became a free agent following the season.

=== St. Louis Cardinals ===
On November 21, 2023, Gibson signed a one-year contract with the St. Louis Cardinals. His contract gives him a $12 million salary, a $12 million club option for 2025 with a $1 million buyout, and a $500,000 bonus in any year in which he pitches 175 or more innings. Gibson made 30 starts for the Cardinals in 2024, compiling an 8–8 record and 4.24 ERA with 151 strikeouts across 169 2/3 innings pitched. The Cardinals declined his option on October 31, 2024, making him a free agent.

=== Baltimore Orioles (second stint) ===
On March 21, 2025, Gibson signed a one-year, $5.25 million contract with the Baltimore Orioles. He consented to be optioned to the Triple-A Norfolk Tides to begin the year, in order to build up after missing most of spring training. In four starts for Baltimore, Gibson struggled to an 0–3 record and 16.78 ERA with 10 strikeouts across 12 1/3 innings pitched. On May 18, Gibson was designated for assignment by the Orioles. He was released by Baltimore on May 20.

=== Tampa Bay Rays ===
On May 28, 2025, Gibson signed a minor league contract with the Tampa Bay Rays. In four starts for the Triple-A Durham Bulls, he posted a 1–0 record and 0.52 ERA with 22 strikeouts across 17 1/3 innings pitched. On June 20, Gibson opted out of his contract and became a free agent. Gibson retired from professional baseball on July 17.

== Pitcher profile ==
Gibson carries a six-pitch repertoire consisting of a sinker, a slider, a cut fastball, a four-seam fastball, a changeup, and a curveball. Boasting a fastball speed of only 93.2 mph (150.0 km/h), rather than pitching for power, he aims to confuse his opponents by getting them to chase balls outside of the strike zone. His sinker is his primary pitch, with an average velocity of 92.8 mph (149.3 km/h). Both the slider and the cutter act as off-speed pitches that feint to Gibson's glove side, but at 89.1 mph (143.4 km/h), the cutter is much faster than his 83.5 mph (134.4 km/h) slider. His 85.3 mph (137.3 km/h) changeup breaks to the opposite side of the former two pitches, while the 79.4 mph (127.8 km/h) curveball serves as a surprise from the other five. This expanded repertoire has made Gibson an unpredictable pitcher to face; whereas, early in his career, batters knew how to hit well against him, he has improved at generating strikeouts, particularly with use of his slider.

== Personal life ==
Gibson married Elizabeth Straatmann on November 27, 2010. The couple have four children together, with the youngest born in December 2022. Gibson is a Christian, and grew up attending a Southern Baptist church in Indiana.
