= Trevor May =

American baseball player (born 1989)

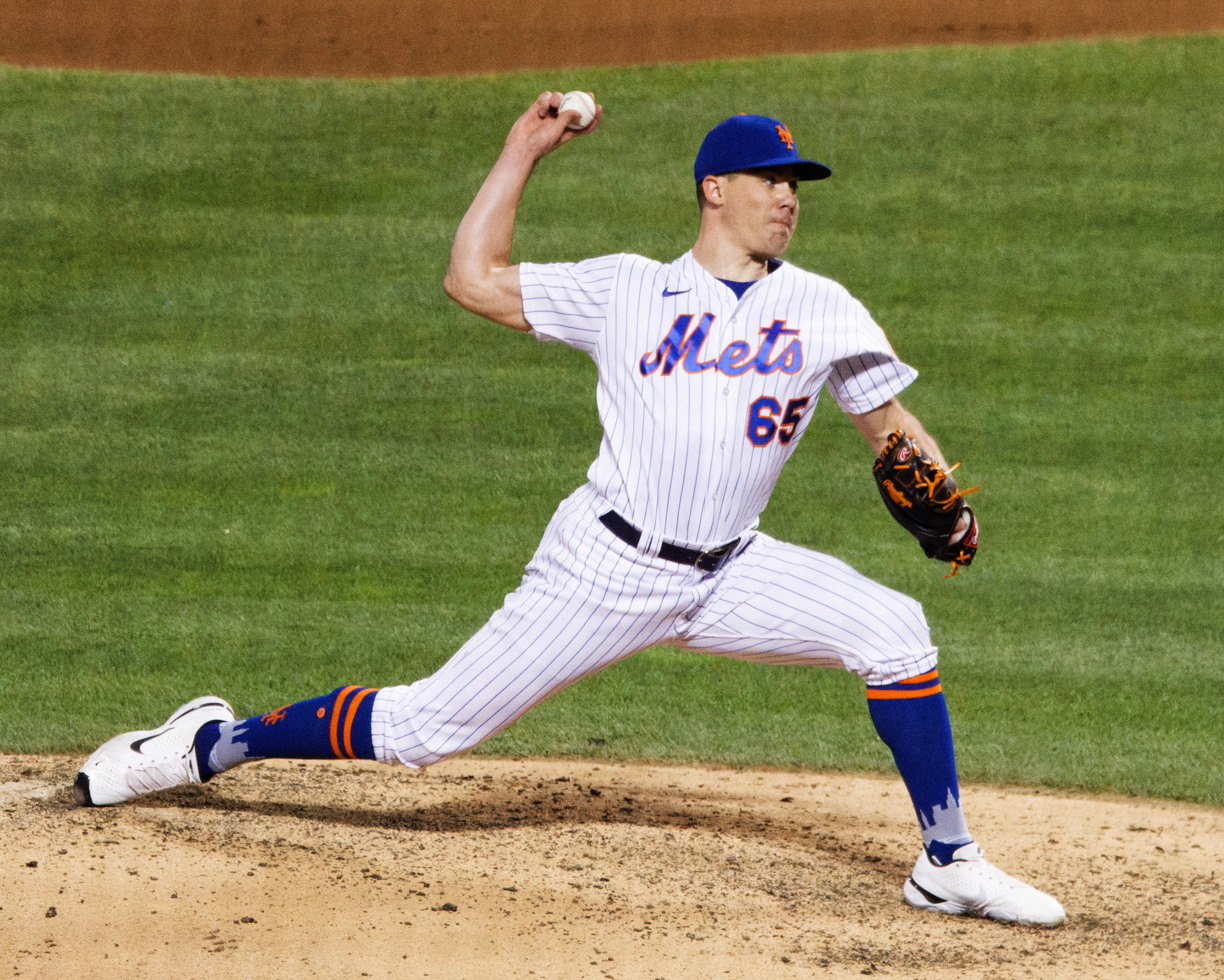
- May with the New York Mets in 2022
- Pitcher
- Born: September 23, 1989 (age 37); Longview, Washington, U.S.
- Batted: Right Threw: Right

MLB debut
- August 9, 2014, for the Minnesota Twins

Last MLB appearance
- September 30, 2023, for the Oakland Athletics

MLB statistics
- Win–loss record: 36–28
- Earned run average: 4.24
- Strikeouts: 520
- Stats at Baseball Reference

Teams
- Minnesota Twins (2014–2016, 2018–2020); New York Mets (2021–2022); Oakland Athletics (2023)

Trevor Joseph May (born September 23, 1989) is an American former professional baseball pitcher. He played in Major League Baseball (MLB) for the Minnesota Twins, New York Mets, and the Oakland Athletics from 2014 to 2023. He is currently a YouTuber and streamer. May is also a part-owner of the Fan Controlled Football's (FCF) FCF Zappers.

== High school ==
May attended Kelso High School in Kelso, Washington. In his senior year, he led the Hilanders to a 25–2 win–loss record, and a second-place finish at the 3A Washington Interscholastic Activities Association baseball championships. He signed a letter of intent to play at the University of Washington. May was named 3A State Player of the Year by the Washington State Baseball Coaches Association. He graduated in 2008 as class valedictorian.

== Professional career ==
=== Philadelphia Phillies ===
The Philadelphia Phillies selected May in the fourth round of the 2008 Major League Baseball draft. Prior to the 2011 season, May was the Phillies best prospect according to Baseball America. That season, while pitching for the Clearwater Threshers, he went 10–8 with a 3.63 earned run average and 208 strikeouts in 151 innings pitched. After the season, he won the Paul Owens Award, which is awarded to the Phillies best minor league pitcher.

Prior to the 2012 season, May was the Phillies' best prospect according to Baseball America. He was ranked 69th in all of baseball.

=== Minnesota Twins ===
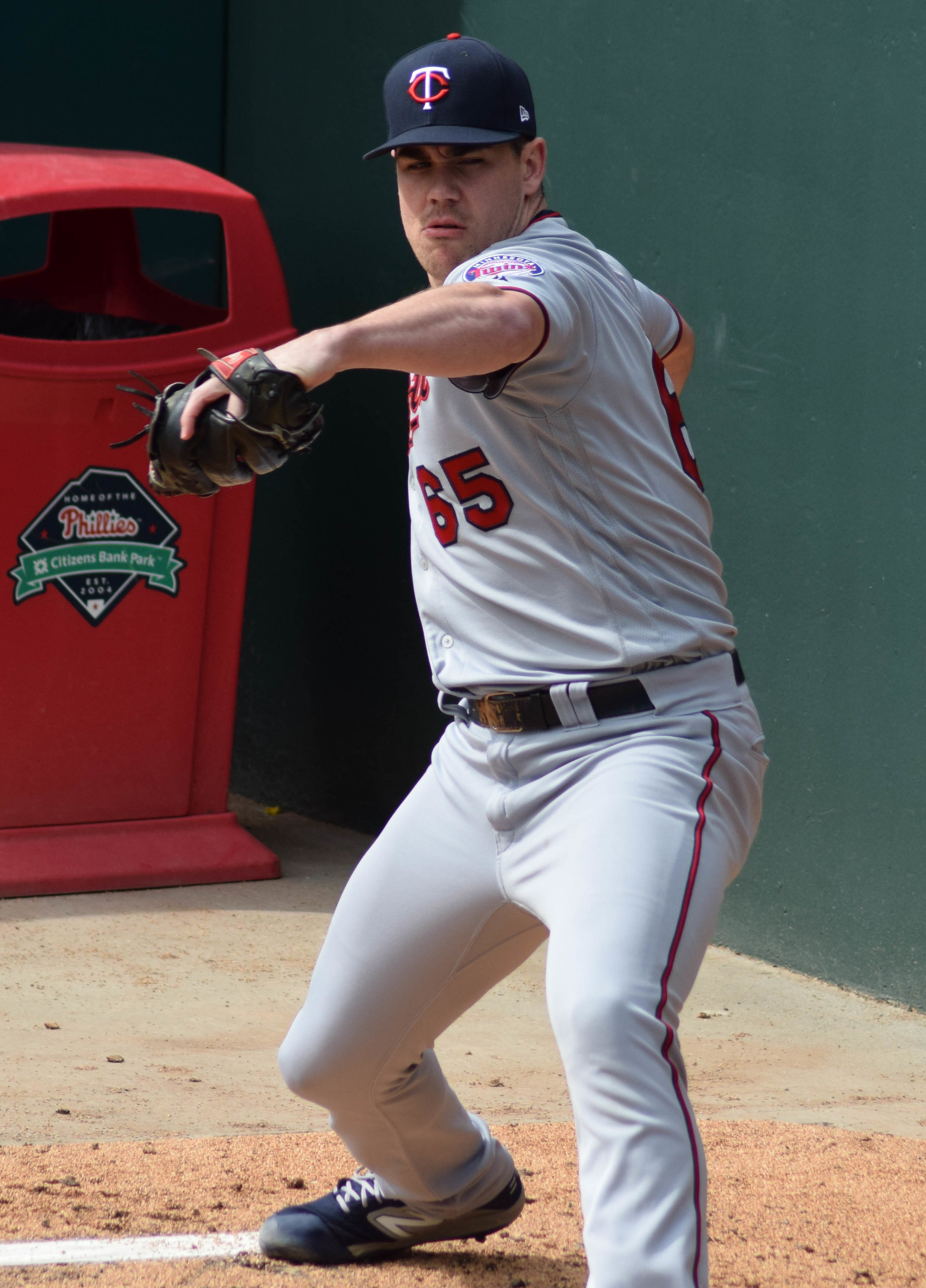
May with the Twins in 2019

On December 6, 2012, the Phillies traded May, along with Vance Worley, to the Minnesota Twins for Ben Revere. May was named to the 2014 All-Star Futures Game, but withdrew due to injury.

May made his major league debut on August 9, 2014, against the Oakland Athletics. He had been pitching well for the Rochester Red Wings of the Class AAA International League, but lasted only two innings, throwing 28 of 63 pitches for strikes, walking seven, allowing four earned runs, and not striking out a batter. May got his first major league win on September 3, 2014, as the Twins beat the Chicago White Sox at home, 11–4. He pitched 5 1/3 innings allowing six hits and three earned runs while striking out six.

In 2016, May was 2–2 with a 5.27 ERA as a reliever, before his season ended with a back injury that was diagnosed as a stress fracture. In March 2017 an MRI revealed that May had a tear in his ulnar collateral ligament in his pitching elbow. On March 21, it was revealed that May would undergo Tommy John surgery, therefore ending his 2017 season.

May began the 2018 season on the 60-day disabled list. He was activated on June 6, and optioned to Triple-A. For the Twins in 2019, May recorded a 2.94 ERA and 5–3 record with 79 strikeouts in 64 1/3 innings pitched. In 2020, May had an ERA of 3.86 in 23 1/3 innings with 38 strikeouts.

=== New York Mets ===
On December 2, 2020, May signed a two-year contract worth $15.5 million with the New York Mets. In 2021, May pitched in a career-high 68 games and posted a 7–3 record with a 3.59 ERA and 83 strikeouts in 62 2/3 innings.

On May 15, 2022, May was placed on the 60-day injured list with a stress reaction in the lower portion of his humerus. He was activated on August 3, alongside Darin Ruf and Mychal Givens. Across 26 games for New York in 2022, May posted a 2–0 record, a 5.04 ERA, and 30 strikeouts in 25 innings pitched.

=== Oakland Athletics ===
On December 16, 2022, May signed a one-year contract with the Oakland Athletics. He made 49 appearances for the Athletics in 2023, registering a 3.28 ERA with 40 strikeouts and a career-high 21 saves in 46 2/3 innings pitched. Following the season on October 16, 2023, May announced his retirement from baseball via Twitch, and in the process, spoke negatively about Athletics owner John Fisher and his plans to move the team to Las Vegas.

== Personal life ==
May has an avid interest in electronic music, previously using the pseudonym DJ HEYBEEF; more recently, DJ MAZR, and streams on Twitch. May described himself as "a partnered Twitch Streamer, a DJ, a Social Media connoisseur, an esports Entrepreneur, a gaming tournament organizer and commentator, and obviously an exceptional writer." May is a co-owner of Winston's Lab, an "Esports Lab" that focuses on measuring players' and teams' performance in Overwatch League (OWL). In February 2017, May signed with Canadian professional esports organization, Luminosity Gaming as a streamer. May co-hosts the "May Contain Action" podcast along with Twitch Streamer Paul "actionjaxon" Jackson.

May is one of five partial owners of the FCF Zappers Indoor Football team. May is also a fan of Brandon Sanderson, calling his Mistborn and The Stormlight Archive franchises, "Two of the most imaginative series I've ever read."
