= Aaron Thompson (baseball) =

American baseball player (born 1987)

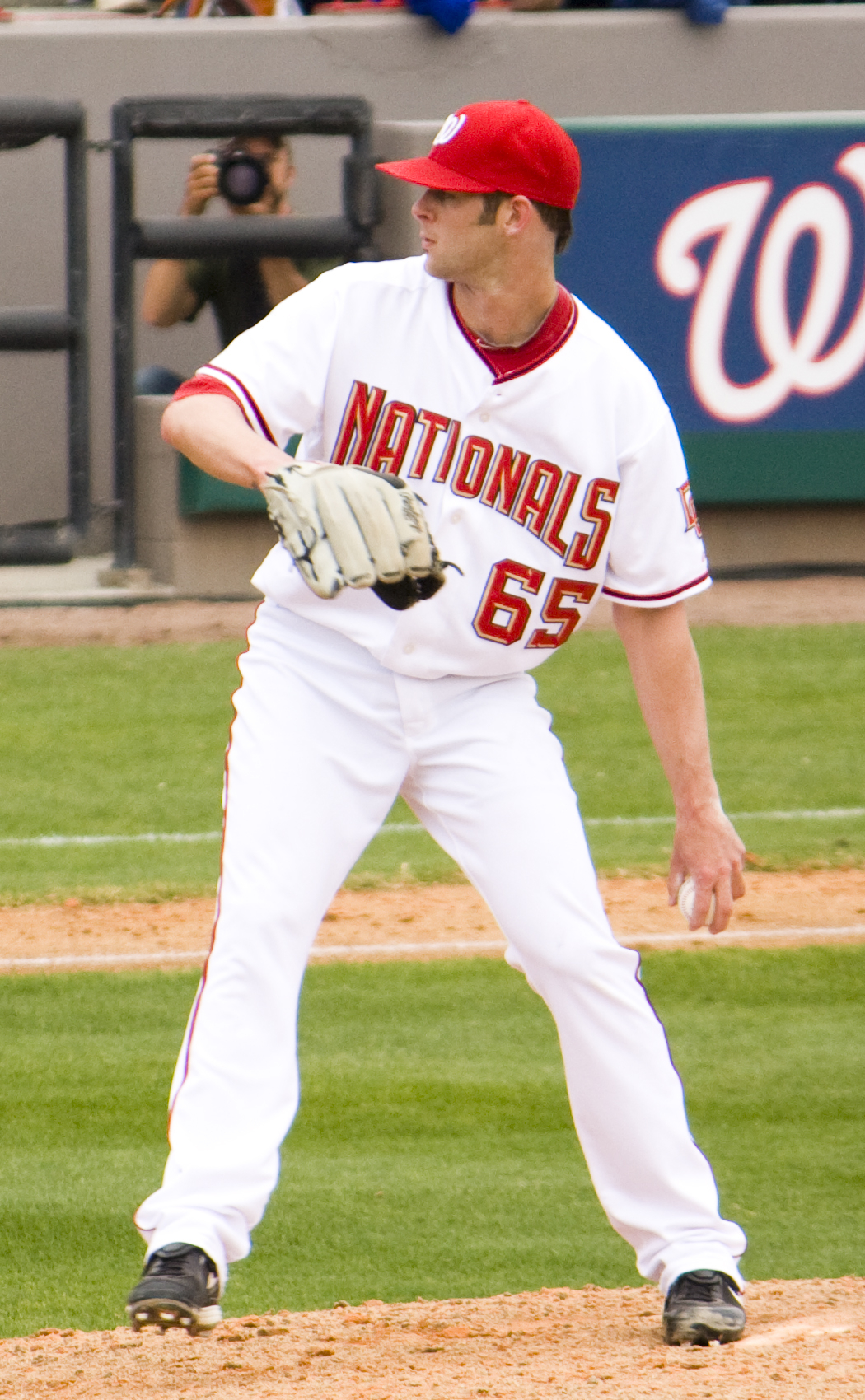
- Thompson with the Washington Nationals
- Pitcher
- Born: February 28, 1987 (age 38); Santa Fe, New Mexico, U.S.
- Batted: Left Threw: Left

MLB debut
- August 24, 2011, for the Pittsburgh Pirates

Last MLB appearance
- July 5, 2015, for the Minnesota Twins

MLB statistics
- Win–loss record: 1–3
- Earned run average: 4.94
- Strikeouts: 24
- Stats at Baseball Reference

Teams
- Pittsburgh Pirates (2011); Minnesota Twins (2014–2015)

Aaron M. Thompson (born February 28, 1987) is an American former professional baseball pitcher. He played in Major League Baseball (MLB) for the Pittsburgh Pirates and Minnesota Twins. He is also credited with being the first MLB player to sport a “man-bun”.

== Early life ==
Thompson was born in Santa Fe, New Mexico. He grew up in Beaumont, Texas, and then graduated from Second Baptist High School of Houston in 2005. While there, he went 8-3 with two saves and 0.84 earned run average in 14 games as a senior, with 133 strikeouts and 35 walks in 66 innings. Brother of Will Thompson, professional actor and creator of Free Native, and Luke Milstead, a two-time Texas academic All-State athlete.

== Professional career ==
=== Florida Marlins ===
He had signed a National Letter of Intent with Texas A&M, but was drafted in the first round (22nd overall) of the 2005 Major League Baseball draft and joined the Florida Marlins organization.

While with the Marlins; Thompson was selected as organizational Pitcher of the Month, Player of the Week, and he represented his club as a member of the South Atlantic League All-Star Team.

=== Washington Nationals ===
The Washington Nationals acquired Thompson at the 2009 trade deadline in exchange for first baseman Nick Johnson. He spent most of his time with the club's Double–A affiliate, the Harrisburg Senators, as a starter.

=== Pittsburgh Pirates ===
The Pittsburgh Pirates claimed Thompson off waivers from the Nationals on December 24, 2010.

On August 24, 2011, Thompson made his major league debut for the Pirates at PNC Park. During the game, he pitched 4 1/3 scoreless innings, before being relieved in the 2-0 shutout over the Milwaukee Brewers.

He was sent outright to Triple-A Indianapolis Indians on November 1, he elected free agency the next day.

Following the 2011 season, Thompson played winter ball for the Toros del Este of the LIDOM.

=== Minnesota Twins ===
Thompson signed a minor league contract with the Minnesota Twins on December 15, 2011. Between 2012 and 2013, he pitched almost exclusively out of the bullpen, totaling 64 appearances. He also played the first half of the 2013 winter ball season with the Aragua Tigres of the LVBP and was named "Setup del Ano" for the league that season.

On August 30, 2014, Thompson was called up and added to the Twins roster. He pitched in seven games as a reliever, getting six strikeouts and posting an ERA of 2.45.

In 2015, Thompson joined the Twins' bullpen and pitched primarily in a middle-relief role, contributing largely to the team's first-half success. Upon the return of Ervin Santana from steroid suspension, Thompson was demoted to the Triple–A Rochester Red Wings, where he finished the season. Over the following winter he would travel to play for the Canberra Cavalry of the Australian Baseball League. He was later released from the Twins at the end of the following spring training on April 11, 2016.

=== Sugar Land Skeeters ===
Thompson signed with the Sugar Land Skeeters Of The Atlantic League of Professional Baseball following his release from the Twins. In 25 games (22 starts) for the Skeeters, he registered a 9–5 record and 3.98 ERA with 102 strikeouts across 133 1/3 innings pitched. Thompson became a free agent following the 2016 season.

=== Tomateros De Culiacán ===
Thompson pitched for Tomateros de Culiacán in the Mexican Pacific League in 2017.

Thompson retired from professional baseball in February 2017.
