= 2015 New York Yankees season =

Season for the Major League Baseball team the New York Yankees

2015 New York Yankees
- American League Wild Card
- League: American League
- Division: East
- Ballpark: Yankee Stadium
- City: New York, New York
- Record: 87–75 (.537)
- Divisional place: 2nd
- Owners: Yankee Global Enterprises
- General managers: Brian Cashman
- Managers: Joe Girardi
- Television: YES Network; WPIX-TV (Michael Kay, Ken Singleton, Meredith Marakovits, Jack Curry, David Cone, John Flaherty, Al Leiter, Paul O'Neill, Lou Pinella, Bob Lorenz)
- Radio: WFAN / WFAN-FM; New York Yankees Radio Network (John Sterling, Suzyn Waldman, Beto Villa, Francisco Rivera)

The 2015 New York Yankees season was the 113th for the New York Yankees, who play in the American League East of Major League Baseball. The team finished the regular season with a record of 87–75, six games behind the Toronto Blue Jays for second place. They clinched the host Wild Card berth, but lost to the Houston Astros in the 2015 American League Wild Card Game.

This was the Yankees' first full season in over twenty years without team captain and shortstop Derek Jeter, who retired at the end of the 2014 season. In addition, the Yankees retired the jersey numbers of center fielder Bernie Williams (51), catcher Jorge Posada (20), and pitcher Andy Pettitte (46) during the season; doing so brought the total amount of retired numbers to 20, for 22 different players.

In 2022, a letter was released detailing the illicit use of technology to steal signs by the Yankees during the 2015 and 2016 seasons.

== Offseason ==
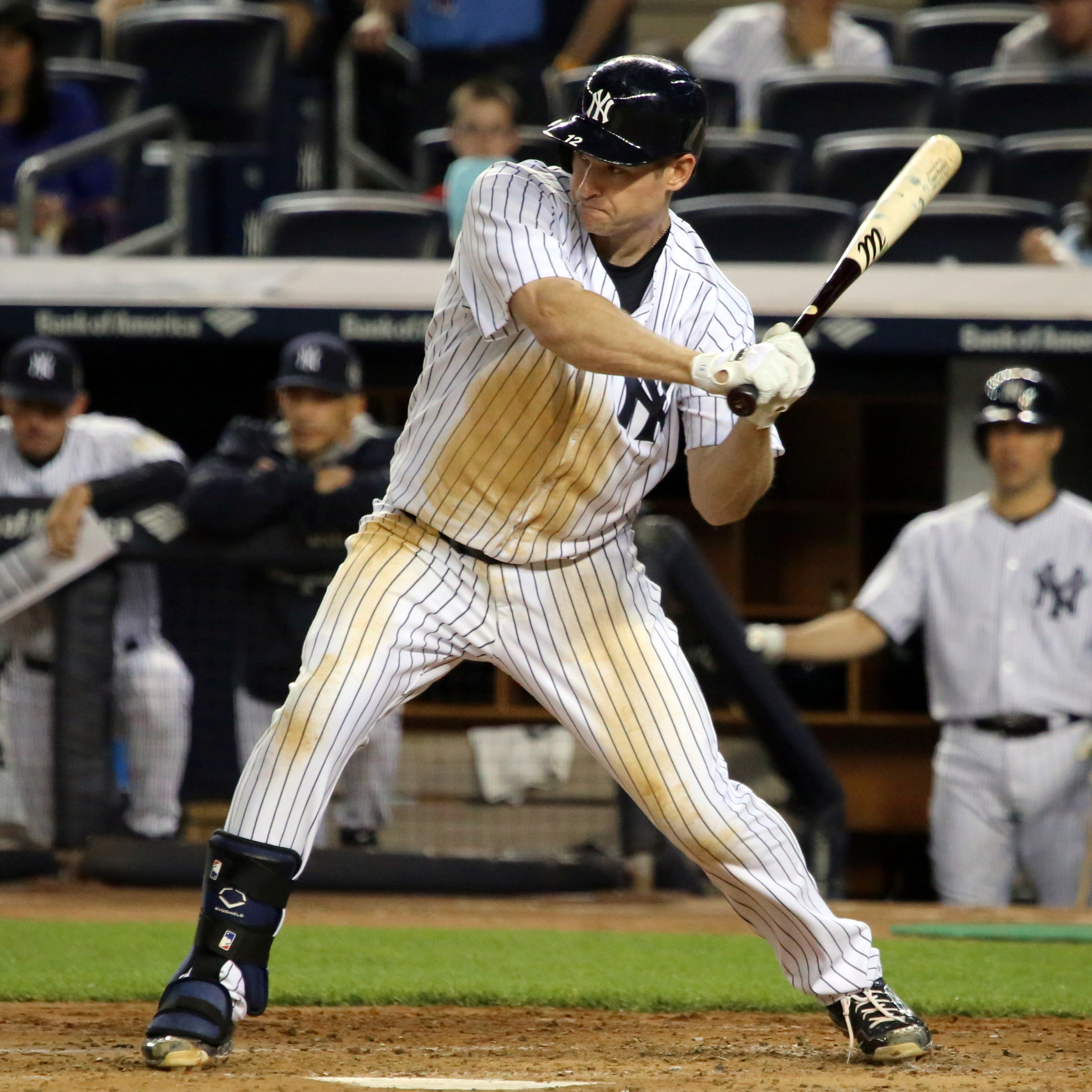
Chase Headley re-signed with the Yankees.

The Yankees fired Kevin Long, the hitting coach, and Mick Kelleher, the first base coach on October 10. They also re-signed GM Brian Cashman to a three-year deal that same day.

On November 8, the Yankees re-signed free agent outfielder Chris Young to a 1-year, $2.5 million contract with incentives. On November 12, the Yankees signed left-hander José de Paula to a 1-year major league contract worth $500,000. That same day, the Yankees traded longtime backup catcher Francisco Cervelli to the Pittsburgh Pirates in exchange for left-hander Justin Wilson.

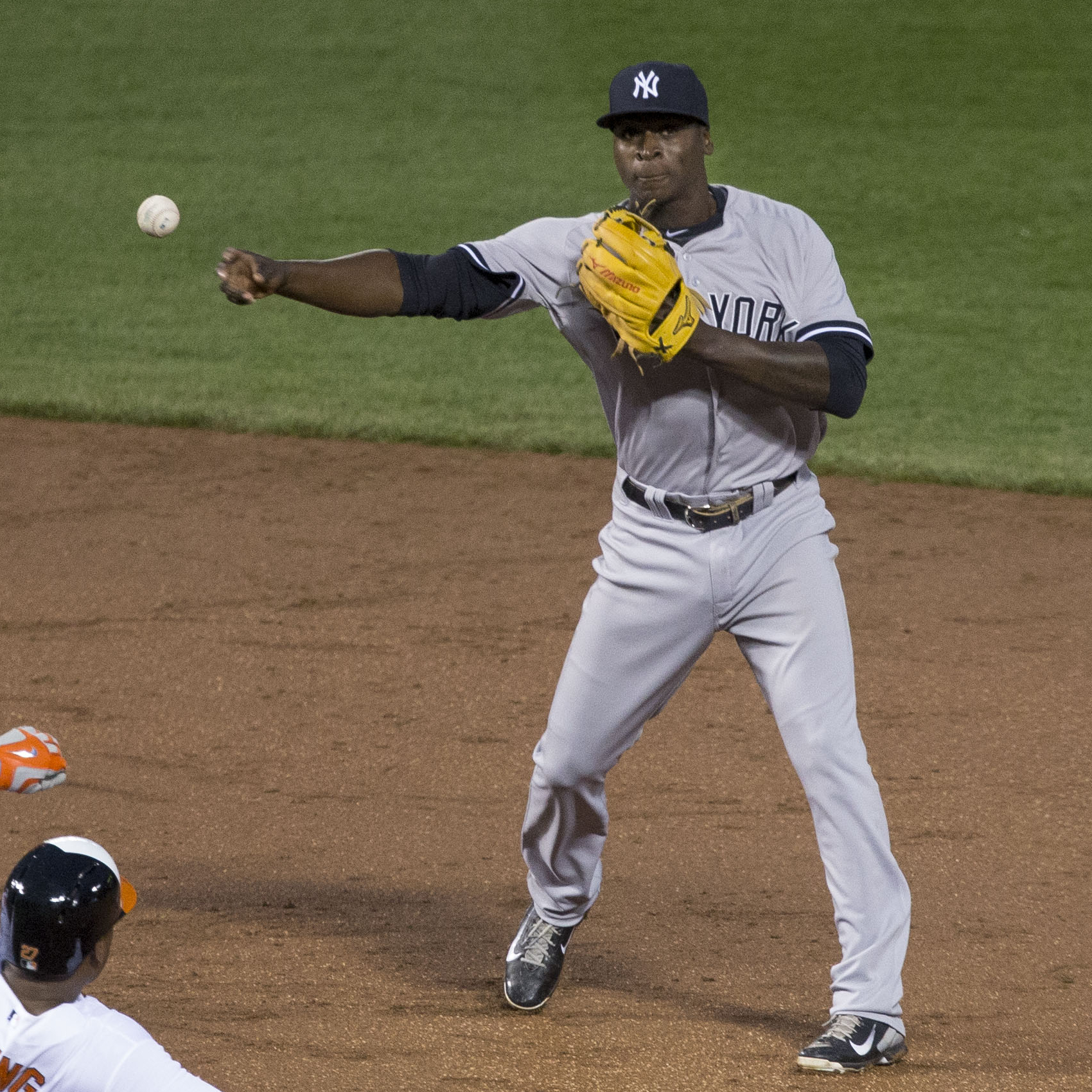
Didi Gregorius was acquired from Arizona in a three-team trade that also sent pitcher Shane Greene from New York to Detroit, and Robbie Ray and Domingo Leyba from Detroit to Arizona.

On December 3, the Yankees signed reliever Esmil Rogers to a 1-year, $1.48 million contract. On December 5, the Yankees acquired shortstop Didi Gregorius from the Arizona Diamondbacks in a three-team trade involving the Detroit Tigers. The Yankees sent Shane Greene to the Tigers as part of the trade. That same day, the Yankees signed reliever Andrew Miller to a 4-year, $36 million deal. On December 15, the Yankees re-signed free agent third baseman Chase Headley, to a 4-year deal worth $52 million. On December 16, the Yankees re-signed left-hander Chris Capuano to a 1-year, $5 million deal. On December 19, the Yankees traded utility infielder Martín Prado to the Miami Marlins, along with pitcher David Phelps, in exchange for pitcher Nathan Eovaldi, 1B/OF Garrett Jones, and pitching prospect Domingo Germán. Also on December 19, the Yankees acquired relief pitcher Gonzalez Germen from the New York Mets, in exchange for cash considerations. He was later traded to the Texas Rangers on January 20, again in exchange for cash considerations. On December 29, the Yankees traded reliever Shawn Kelley to the San Diego Padres, in exchange for minor league pitcher Johnny Barbato.

On January 1, the Yankees traded pitching prospect Manny Banuelos to the Atlanta Braves, in exchange for relievers David Carpenter, and Chasen Shreve. On January 6, the Yankees signed infielder Stephen Drew to a 1-year contract, worth $5 million with incentives. On January 11, the Yankees hired Jeff Pentland to be their main hitting coach, along with Alan Cockrell to be the assistant hitting coach. In addition, the Yankees also hired Joe Espada to be their third base coach. On January 13, the Yankees acquired reliever Chris Martin from the Colorado Rockies in exchange for cash considerations.

On February 16, the Yankees signed pitcher Jared Burton to a minor league contract and invited him to spring training. In February, the Yankees announced they will retire Bernie Williams number 51 on May 24, Jorge Posada's number 20 on August 22, and Andy Pettitte's number 46 on August 23.

On March 11, Yankees pitcher Chris Capuano left a spring training game with a strained right quad. On March 26, the Yankees released pitcher Jared Burton, before resigning him three days later. On April 1, the Yankees acquired Gregorio Petit from the Houston Astros for cash or a player to be named later.

=== Notable transaction chart ===
	Subtractions	Additions
Players	SS Derek Jeter (retired); OF Zoilo Almonte (signed with Braves); C Francisco Cervelli (trade with Pirates); RHP Shane Greene (trade with Tigers); IF/OF Martín Prado (trade with Marlins); RHP David Phelps (trade with Marlins); IF Zelous Wheeler (sold to Golden Eagles); RHP Preston Claiborne (waiver claim by Marlins); LHP David Huff (signed with Dodgers); OF Ichiro Suzuki (signed with Marlins); RHP David Robertson (signed with White Sox); RHP Shawn Kelley (trade with Padres); RHP Brandon McCarthy (signed with Dodgers); RHP Hiroki Kuroda (signed with Carp); LHP Jeff Francis (signed with Blue Jays)	RHP Nathan Eovaldi (trade with Marlins); LHP Chasen Shreve (trade with Braves); RHP David Carpenter (trade with Braves); LHP Justin Wilson (trade with Pirates); IF Didi Gregorius (trade with Diamondbacks); IF Gregorio Petit (trade with Astros); 1B/OF Garrett Jones (trade with Marlins); RHP Chris Martin (trade with Rockies); RHP Jared Burton (free agent); LHP Andrew Miller (free agent)
Personnel	Hitting coach Kevin Long; First base coach Mick Kelleher	Hitting coach Jeff Pentland; Third base coach Joe Espada; Assistant hitting coach Alan Cockrell

== Season standings ==
=== American League East ===
AL East
Team	W	L	Pct.	GB	Home	Road
Toronto Blue Jays	93	69	.574	—	53‍–‍28	40‍–‍41
New York Yankees	87	75	.537	6	45‍–‍36	42‍–‍39
Baltimore Orioles	81	81	.500	12	47‍–‍31	34‍–‍50
Tampa Bay Rays	80	82	.494	13	42‍–‍42	38‍–‍40
Boston Red Sox	78	84	.481	15	43‍–‍38	35‍–‍46

=== American League Wild Card ===
Division leaders
Team	W	L	Pct.
Kansas City Royals	95	67	.586
Toronto Blue Jays	93	69	.574
Texas Rangers	88	74	.543

Wild Card teams (Top 2 teams qualify for postseason)
Team	W	L	Pct.	GB
New York Yankees	87	75	.537	+1
Houston Astros	86	76	.531	—
Los Angeles Angels	85	77	.525	1
Minnesota Twins	83	79	.512	3
Cleveland Indians	81	80	.503	4½
Baltimore Orioles	81	81	.500	5
Tampa Bay Rays	80	82	.494	6
Boston Red Sox	78	84	.481	8
Chicago White Sox	76	86	.469	10
Seattle Mariners	76	86	.469	10
Detroit Tigers	74	87	.460	11½
Oakland Athletics	68	94	.420	18

== Season summary ==
=== April ===
Opening day lineup
Number	Name	Position
22	Jacoby Ellsbury	CF
11	Brett Gardner	LF
36	Carlos Beltrán	RF
25	Mark Teixeira	1B
34	Brian McCann	C
12	Chase Headley	3B
13	Alex Rodriguez	DH
14	Stephen Drew	2B
18	Didi Gregorius	SS
19	Masahiro Tanaka	P

The Yankees lost their Opening Day game on April 6 against Toronto, losing 6–1. The Yankees only accumulated three total hits that first game, with a home run by Brett Gardner accounting for the only run scored by the Yankees. They bounced back to win the next game 4–3 on April 8, which was the first Yankees win of the season. On April 28, ace pitcher Masahiro Tanaka was placed on the 15-day disabled list with a tendinitis in his right wrist and a slight strain on his forearm. It was not connected to the elbow injury he suffered in the previous season. The Yankees would later finish the first month with a 13–9 record atop the American League East division.

The success of the New York Yankees in April was a result of good hitting against opposing team's bullpens and good offense to keep games close. In fact, seven of the thirteen wins in April were decided by one or two runs. Mixing and matching both pitching and offense was also key in the part of manager Joe Girardi. Some notable contributions came from players such as Alex Rodriguez, Jacoby Ellsbury, Mark Teixeira, Chris Young, Brett Gardner, Dellin Betances, and even from the Yankees closer Andrew Miller. Miller, who had joined the Yankees during the off-season, had been impressive with eight saves in eight chances in the month of April.

In April, Brett Gardner had also started the trend of having the team grow mustaches and it caught on.

=== May ===
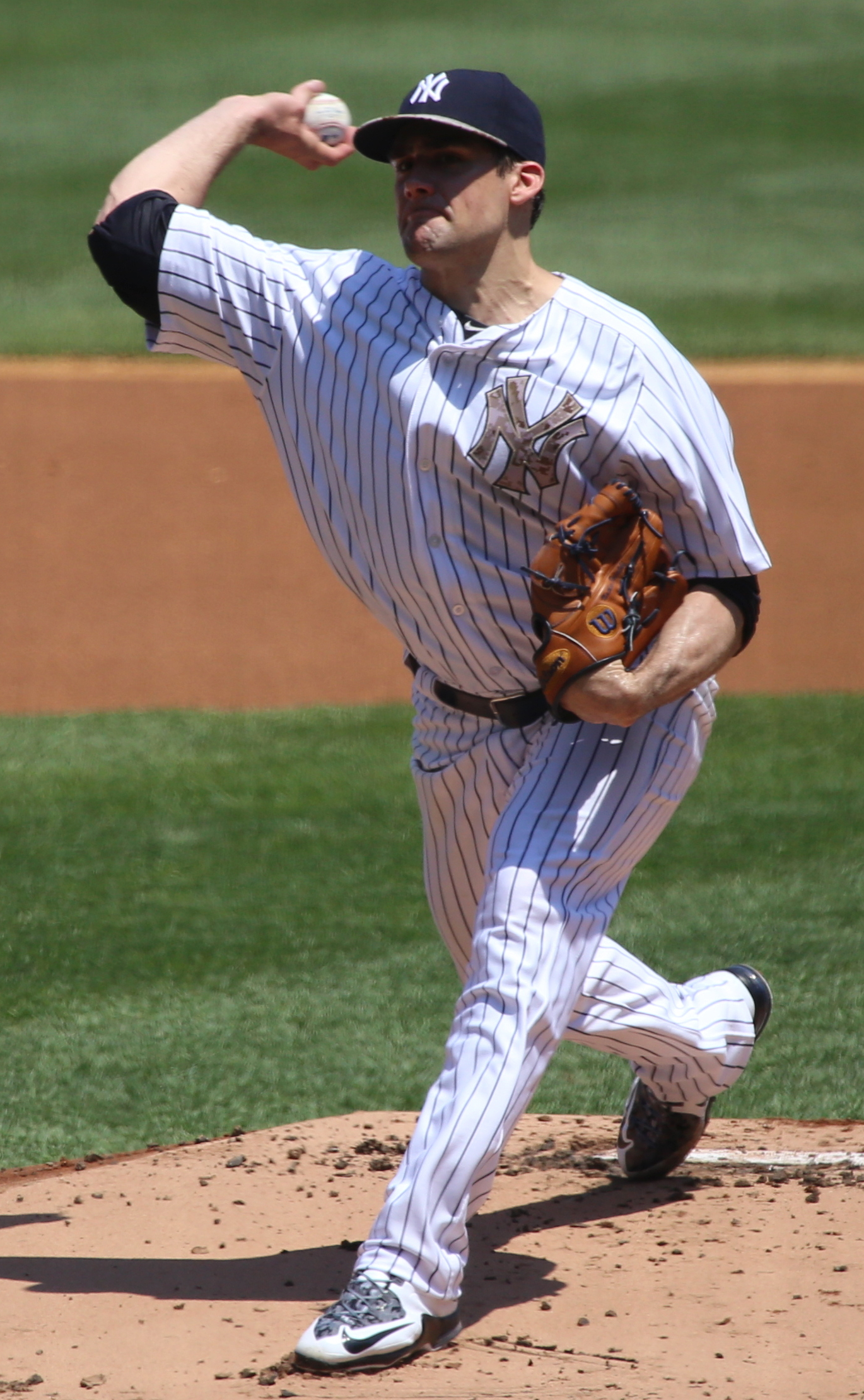
Nathan Eovaldi pitching on May 25, 2015.

The Yankees beat the Boston Red Sox 4–2 on May 2, during which Andrew Miller had set Yankees club history by securing nine saves in the first 23 games the Yankees had played in a season. Mariano Rivera, the former Yankees closer who had retired following the 2013 season, had not even performed this feat during his 19-year career. It was the same game that Alex Rodriguez hit a pinch-hit home run off of Red Sox pitcher Junichi Tazawa, his first as a pinch-hitter, and tied Willie Mays for fourth on the all-time home run list at 660 homers. Rodriguez was emotional following the game. The Yankees not long after had announced they would not be paying Rodriguez the $6 million in bonuses that he was promised when he had signed a contract years before for reaching these marks.

On May 19, Jacoby Ellsbury was placed on the 15-day disabled list with a sprained right knee. This was his first DL stint in his career with the Yankees. May did not turn out well for the Yankees as they finished the month winning 13 ball games but losing 16.

=== June ===
June saw a turn in play for the Yankees, as they won seven straight to begin the month of June. In the month, various achievements were reached. Alex Rodriguez hit his 3000th career hit at home on June 19, hitting a home run to right field off from Detroit Tigers pitcher Justin Verlander. The achievement was similar to Derek Jeter's 3000th hit in 2011, when he homered to left off from Tampa Bay Rays pitcher David Price. Price and Verlander happen to both be winners of the Cy Young Award. Ironically, Price and Verlander were both members of the Tigers organization the date of Rodriguez's 3000th hit. A few weeks later, Rodriguez was given the ball back from Zack Hample, the fan who caught it.

In the same month, the disabled list saw a bit of action. Notable to mention, Jacoby Ellsbury's injury took longer than expected to heal up. His rehab assignment began on June 29. In a home series against the Philadelphia Phillies, pitcher Iván Nova had returned to the hill for the first time since being injured in the prior season, winning for the Yankees and preventing a sweep. Another notable injury-related movement was the placement of closing pitcher Andrew Miller onto the disabled list early in June with a strained forearm muscle.

The Yankees finished the month of June winning 15 games and losing 12.

=== July ===
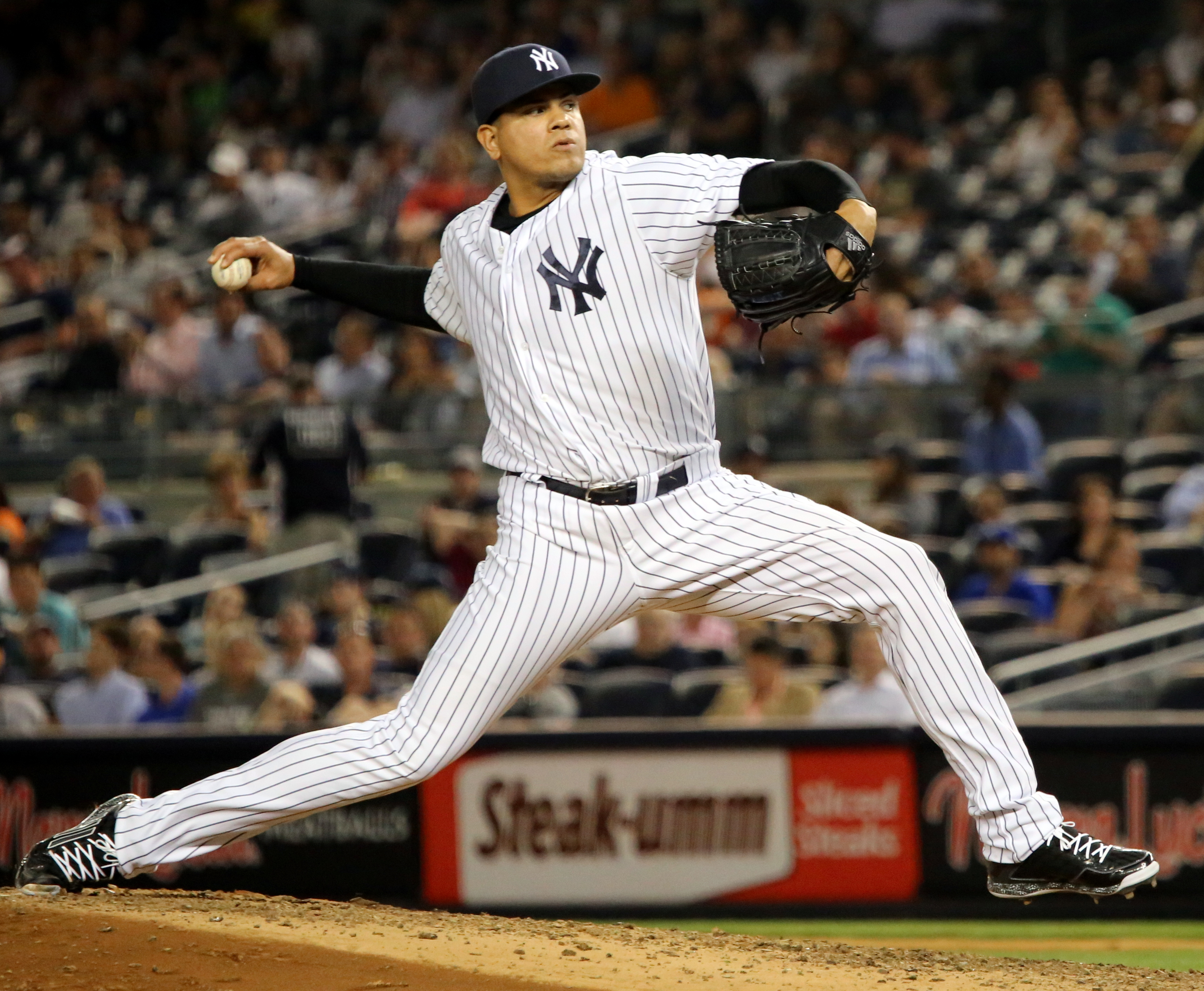
Yankees' all-star reliever Dellin Betances pitching in a game.

When the roster for the American League all-star team was announced, Dellin Betances and Mark Teixeira were revealed to be on the roster, with Teixeira replacing an injured Miguel Cabrera of the Tigers. In addition, the final vote held Brett Gardner as a candidate. Gardner later was announced as the replacement on the roster for an injured Alex Gordon of the Royals. None of them were starters. On July 28 against the Texas Rangers, the Yankees score 21 unanswered runs – 11 of them in the 2nd inning – after giving up 5 runs in the first inning en route to a 21–5 win.

On July 30, the Seattle Mariners traded Dustin Ackley to the Yankees for José Ramírez and Ramón Flores. The next day, Garrett Jones was designated for assignment. (Jones was later re-signed in early August and then re-designated for assignment not long after)

The Yankees finished July with 17 wins and 7 losses.

=== August ===
The beginning of August saw the Yankees begin to struggle. With the Toronto Blue Jays in a hot streak since the end of July (where they revamped their team with a few big name players), a once respectable lead in the division had shrunk down to just a half game ahead of the Jays by the end of August 11. That night, the Yankees had traveled to Cleveland to face the Indians. Entering that game, the Yankees had gone 31 straight innings without scoring a run. Despite having a 4–2 lead in the 10th inning, closer Andrew Miller blew the save. The game was decided in the 16th inning, where Michael Brantley had walked off for the Indians. The Yankees lost 5–4. They lost the next day and the Blue Jays took lead of the division by half a game.

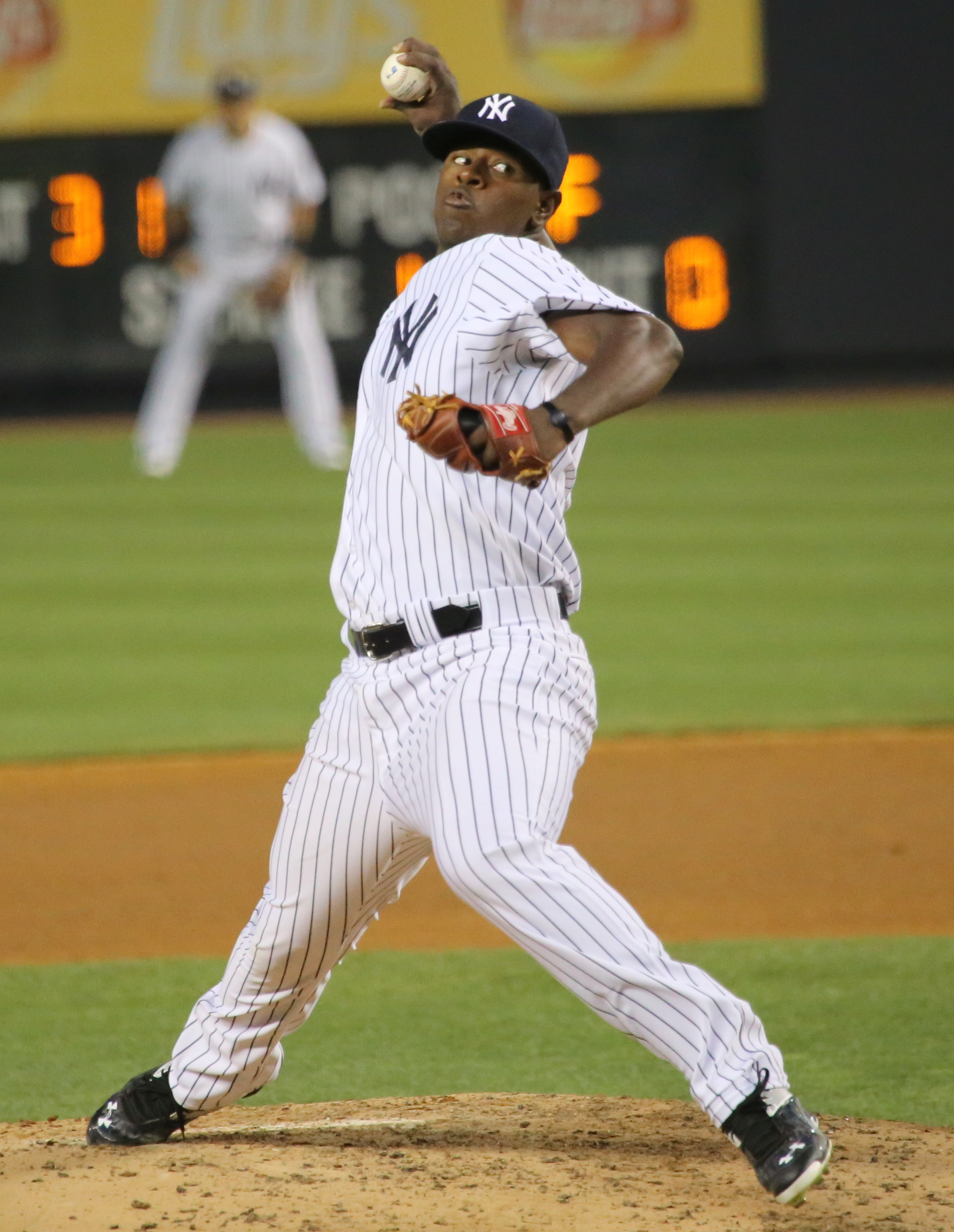
Luis Severino pitching his major league debut against the Boston Red Sox on August 5.

On August 5, Luis Severino had his major league debut starting against the Red Sox.

On August 13 the New York Yankees called up Greg Bird who went 0 for 5 in his debut. He got his first career hit on August 15 and his first and second career home runs on August 19.

The Yankees retook the division the lead on August 14 in one of the most intense games of the season. Down 3–1 in the top of the eighth, Yankees outfielder Carlos Beltrán hit a pinch-hit three-run home run to put the Yankees up 4–3; closer Andrew Miller finished the game for the Yankees in a nail-biting fashion, striking out Troy Tulowitzki on a slider after a 12-pitch at bat. This also stopped the Blue Jays' 11 game win streak. By the end of August 23, the lead was lost to the Jays once again after the Yankees lost three out of four games at home against the Cleveland Indians. This series also saw CC Sabathia suffer a knee injury that was declared as possibly season-ending with Sabathia on the DL. After walking off against the Houston Astros in the first game at home during a series starting on August 24, the Yankees became tied with the Jays in 1st place in the AL East after Toronto took an off-day. On August 25, the Yankees lost 15–1 to the Astros and lost first place once again to the Blue Jays, who became the first American League East team to win 70 wins. On August 28, the Yankees routed the Atlanta Braves at Turner Field 15–4 and gained their 70th win of the season.

They finished the month with 14 wins and 14 losses.

=== September ===
Mark Teixeira, who bruised his bone on his shin in August, was announced to be out for the rest of season after an MRI scan showed he had in fact fractured it. Nathan Eovaldi's regular season ended after suffering an elbow injury.

The Yankees finished September with a record of 14–14.

=== October ===
On October 1, the Yankees clinched a playoff spot for the first time since 2012 with a 4–1 win over the Boston Red Sox. This was also their 10,000th franchise victory. The Yankees finished October with 1 win and 3 losses. Their final season record was 87–75, which was good enough to win the first American League Wild Card spot, earning the right to host the Houston Astros at Yankee Stadium on Tuesday, October 6.

However, a day prior, CC Sabathia left the team as he checked himself into an alcohol rehabilitation center. It was later announced by the Yankees that Sabathia would not be with the team during the postseason.

==== Wild Card loss ====
The Yankees were shut out 3–0 in the 2015 American League Wild Card Game by the Houston Astros, in a contest that turned on two solo home runs against the game's losing pitcher Masahiro Tanaka, hit by Houston's Carlos Gómez and Colby Rasmus. The winning pitcher was Dallas Keuchel who tossed six scoreless innings.

=== Record vs. opponents ===
2015 American League record Source: MLB Standings Grid – 2015
Team	BAL	BOS	CWS	CLE	DET	HOU	KC	LAA	MIN	NYY	OAK	SEA	TB	TEX	TOR	NL
Baltimore	—	11–8	3–3	5–1	4–3	3–4	3–4	2–4	0–7	10–9	6–1	3–3	10–9	1–6	8–11	12–8
Boston	8–11	—	3–4	2–4	4–2	2–4	4–3	2–5	2–5	8–11	5–1	4–3	9–10	2–5	10–9	13–7
Chicago	3–3	4–3	—	10–9	9–10	5–1	7–12	4–3	6–13	2–5	5–2	4–3	1–5	3–3	4–3	9–11
Cleveland	1–5	4–2	9–10	—	7–11	5–2	9–10	4–2	7–12	5–2	3–4	4–3	5–2	3–3	3–4	12–8
Detroit	3–4	2–4	10–9	11–7	—	3–4	9–10	1–6	11–8	2–5	2–4	4–3	3–3	2–5	2–4	9–11
Houston	4–3	4–2	1–5	2–5	4–3	—	4–2	10–9	3–3	4–3	10–9	12–7	2–5	6–13	4–3	16–4
Kansas City	4–3	3–4	12–7	10–9	10–9	2–4	—	6–1	12–7	2–4	5–1	4–2	6–1	3–4	3–4	13–7
Los Angeles	4–2	5–2	3–4	2–4	6–1	9–10	1–6	—	5–2	2–4	11–8	12–7	3–3	12–7	2–5	8–12
Minnesota	7–0	5–2	13–6	12–7	8–11	3–3	7–12	2–5	—	1–5	4–3	4–3	4–2	3–3	2–5	8–12
New York	9–10	11–8	5–2	2–5	5–2	3–4	4–2	4–2	5–1	—	3–4	5–1	12–7	2–5	6–13	11–9
Oakland	1–6	1–5	2–5	4–3	4–2	9–10	1–5	8–11	3–4	4–3	—	6–13	3–4	10–9	1–5	11–9
Seattle	3–3	3–4	3–4	3–4	3–4	7–12	2–4	7–12	3–4	1–5	13–6	—	4–3	12–7	4–2	8–12
Tampa Bay	9–10	10–9	5–1	2–5	3–3	5–2	1–6	3–3	2–4	7–12	4–3	3–4	—	2–5	10–9	14–6
Texas	6–1	5–2	3–3	3–3	5–2	13–6	4–3	7–12	3–3	5–2	9–10	7–12	5–2	—	2–4	11–9
Toronto	11–8	9–10	3–4	4–3	4–2	3–4	4–3	5–2	5–2	13–6	5–1	2–4	9–10	4–2	—	12–8

== Roster ==
2015 New York Yankees
Roster
Pitchers: 38 Andrew Bailey; 68 Dellin Betances; 65 Danny Burawa; 26 Chris Capuano; 29 David Carpenter; 53 Caleb Cotham; 40 Kyle Davies; 64 José de Paula; 30 Nathan Eovaldi; 74 Nick Goody; 64 Jacob Lindgren; 57 Chris Martin; 48 Andrew Miller; 55 Bryan Mitchell; 65 Diego Moreno; 47 Iván Nova; 67 James Pazos; 40,57 Branden Pinder; 35 Michael Pineda; 66 José Ramírez; 53 Esmil Rogers; 64 Nick Rumbelow; 52 CC Sabathia; 40 Sergio Santos; 40 Luis Severino; 45 Chasen Shreve; 19 Masahiro Tanaka; 40 Matt Tracy; 43 Adam Warren; 39 Chase Whitley; 41 Justin Wilson	Catchers: 34 Brian McCann; 66 John Ryan Murphy; 53 Austin Romine; 73 Gary Sánchez; Infielders: 29 Dustin Ackley; 31 Greg Bird; 14 Stephen Drew; 40 Cole Figueroa; 18 Didi Gregorius; 12 Chase Headley; 31 Gregorio Petit; 38 José Pirela; 64 Rob Refsnyder; 13 Alex Rodriguez; 17 Brendan Ryan; 25 Mark Teixeira	Outfielders: 36 Carlos Beltrán; 22 Jacoby Ellsbury; 31 Ramón Flores; 11 Brett Gardner; 55,72 Slade Heathcott; 33 Garrett Jones; 70 Rico Noel; 63 Mason Williams; 24 Chris Young	Manager: 28 Joe Girardi; Coaches: 62 Alan Cockrell (assistant hitting); 54 Joe Espada (third base); 56 Tony Peña (first base); 61 Jeff Pentland (hitting); 88 Román Rodríguez (bullpen catcher); 58 Larry Rothschild (pitching); 59 Rob Thomson (bench); 60 Gary Tuck (bullpen)

== Game log ==
Legend
Yankees Win	Yankees Loss	Game postponed

Game Log (87–75) Home: 45–36 Away: 42–39
April (13–9) Home: 6–6 Away: 7–3

#	Date	Opponent	Score	Win	Loss	Save	Attendance	Record
1	April 6	Blue Jays	1–6	Hutchison (1–0)	Tanaka (0–1)	–	48,469	0–1
2	April 8	Blue Jays	4–3	Betances (1–0)	Loup (0–1)	Miller (1)	31,020	1–1
3	April 9	Blue Jays	3–6	Norris (1–0)	Sabathia (0–1)	Castro (1)	32,152	1–2
4	April 10	Red Sox	5–6 (19)	Wright (1–0)	Rogers (0–1)	–	41,292	1–3
5	April 11	Red Sox	4–8	Kelly (1–0)	Warren (0–1)	–	46,678	1–4
6	April 12	Red Sox	14–4	Tanaka (1–1)	Buchholz (1–1)	–	43,019	2–4
7	April 13	@ Orioles	6–5	Pineda (1–0)	Hunter (0–1)	Miller (2)	21,633	3–4
8	April 14	@ Orioles	3–4	González (1–1)	Sabathia (0–2)	Britton (2)	19,283	3–5
9	April 15	@ Orioles	5–7	Brach (1–0)	Carpenter (0–1)	Britton (3)	23,409	3–6
10	April 17	@ Rays	5–4	Betances (2–0)	Jepsen (0–1)	Miller (3)	15,752	4–6
11	April 18	@ Rays	9–0	Tanaka (2–1)	Odorizzi (2–1)	–	20,824	5–6
12	April 19	@ Rays	5–3	Pineda (2–0)	Andriese (0–1)	Miller (4)	21,791	6–6
13	April 20	@ Tigers	1–2	Simón (3–0)	Sabathia (0–3)	Soria (5)	27,540	6–7
14	April 21	@ Tigers	5–2	Eovaldi (1–0)	Lobstein (1–1)	Miller (5)	27,031	7–7
15	April 22	@ Tigers	13–4	Warren (1–1)	Price (1–1)	–	27,389	8–7
16	April 23	@ Tigers	2–1	Betances (3–0)	Gorzelanny (0–1)	Miller (6)	27,754	9–7
17	April 24	Mets	6–1	Pineda (3–0)	deGrom (2–2)	–	45,310	10–7
18	April 25	Mets	2–8	Harvey (4–0)	Sabathia (0–4)	–	47,909	10–8
19	April 26	Mets	6–4	Shreve (1–0)	Niese (2–1)	Miller (7)	47,510	11–8
20	April 27	Rays	4–1	Wilson (1–0)	Gomes (0–1)	Miller (8)	34,590	12–8
21	April 28	Rays	4–2	Whitley (1–0)	Odorizzi (2–2)	Martin (1)	36,934	13–8
22	April 29	Rays	2–3 (13)	Gomes (1–1)	Shreve (1–1)	Frieri (2)	30,055	13–9

May (13–16) Home: 6–4 Away: 7–12

#	Date	Opponent	Score	Win	Loss	Save	Attendance	Record
23	May 1	@ Red Sox	3–2	Rogers (1–1)	Tazawa (0–1)	Miller (9)	35,444	14–9
24	May 2	@ Red Sox	4–2	Eovaldi (2–0)	Miley (1–3)	Betances (1)	36,611	15–9
25	May 3	@ Red Sox	8–5	Warren (2–1)	Kelly (1–1)	Miller (10)	33,198	16–9
26	May 4	@ Blue Jays	1–3	Dickey (1–3)	Martin (0–1)	Cecil (2)	19,217	16–10
27	May 5	@ Blue Jays	6–3	Pineda (4–0)	Estrada (1–1)	Miller (11)	21,519	17–10
28	May 6	@ Blue Jays	1–5	Buehrle (4–2)	Sabathia (0–5)	–	21,312	17–11
29	May 7	Orioles	4–3	Eovaldi (3–0)	Tillman (2–4)	Miller (12)	39,816	18–11
30	May 8	Orioles	5–4	Betances (4–0)	González (2–4)	Miller (13)	38,731	19–11
31	May 9	Orioles	2–6	Chen (1–1)	Whitley (1–1)	Britton (6)	41,280	19–12
32	May 10	Orioles	6–2	Pineda (5–0)	Norris (1–4)	–	39,059	20–12
33	May 11	@ Rays	11–5	Sabathia (1–5)	Colomé (2–1)	–	10,619	21–12
34	May 12	@ Rays	2–4	Jepsen (1–2)	Eovaldi (3–1)	Boxberger (9)	10,417	21–13
35	May 13	@ Rays	2–3	Karns (3–1)	Warren (2–2)	Boxberger (10)	11,924	21–14
36	May 14	@ Rays	1–6	Ramírez (1–1)	Whitley (1–2)	Andriese (2)	11,977	21–15
37	May 15	@ Royals	1–12	Young (3–0)	Pineda (5–1)	–	34,584	21–16
38	May 16	@ Royals	5–1	Sabathia (2–5)	Duffy (2–3)	–	31,871	22–16
39	May 17	@ Royals	0–6	Vólquez (3–3)	Capuano (0–1)	–	31,251	22–17
40	May 19	@ Nationals	6–8 (10)	Grace (2–0)	Miller (0–1)	–	37,355	22–18
41	May 20	@ Nationals	2–3	Zimmermann (4–2)	Warren (2–3)	Storen (12)	37,648	22–19
42	May 22	Rangers	9–10	Lewis (4–2)	Pineda (5–2)	Ohlendorf (1)	40,008	22–20
43	May 23	Rangers	4–15	Martinez (4–0)	Sabathia (2–6)	–	42,067	22–21
44	May 24	Rangers	2–5	Gallardo (4–6)	Capuano (0–2)	Tolleson (3)	45,681	22–22
45	May 25	Royals	14–1	Eovaldi (4–1)	Guthrie (4–3)	–	36,031	23–22
46	May 26	Royals	5–1	Warren (3–3)	Vargas (3–2)	–	33,414	24–22
47	May 27	Royals	4–2	Pineda (6–2)	Young (4–1)	Miller (14)	32,734	25–22
48	May 28	@ Athletics	4–5	Scribner (1–0)	Sabathia (2–7)	Clippard (5)	21,795	25–23
49	May 29	@ Athletics	2–6	Gray (6–2)	Capuano (0–3)	Clippard (6)	23,540	25–24
50	May 30	@ Athletics	5–3	Shreve (2–1)	Hahn (2–5)	Miller (15)	25,223	26–24
51	May 31	@ Athletics	0–3	Chavez (2–5)	Warren (3–4)	Clippard (7)	25,457	26–25

June (15–12) Home: 9–4 Away: 6–8

#	Date	Opponent	Score	Win	Loss	Save	Attendance	Record
52	June 1	@ Mariners	7–2	Pineda (7–2)	Hernández (8–2)	–	26,082	27–25
53	June 2	@ Mariners	5–3 (11)	Wilson (2–0)	Wilhelmsen (1–1)	Miller (16)	27,442	28–25
54	June 3	@ Mariners	3–1	Tanaka (3–1)	Walker (2–6)	Miller (17)	32,701	29–25
55	June 5	Angels	8–7	Eovaldi (5–1)	Weaver (4–5)	Betances (2)	40,310	30–25
56	June 6	Angels	8–2	Warren (4–4)	Richards (5–4)	–	40,096	31–25
57	June 7	Angels	6–2	Sabathia (3–7)	Wilson (3–5)	–	43,178	32–25
58	June 9	Nationals	6–1	Tanaka (4–1)	Scherzer (6–5)	–	36,613	33–25
59	June 10	Nationals	4–5 (11)	Treinen (2–2)	Capuano (0–4)	Storen (19)	39,847	33–26
60	June 12	@ Orioles	3–11	Jiménez (4–3)	Pineda (7–3)	–	33,203	33–27
61	June 13	@ Orioles	4–9	Roe (2–0)	Martin (0–2)	–	38,909	33–28
62	June 14	@ Orioles	5–3	Shreve (3–1)	Wright (2–2)	Betances (3)	36,343	34–28
63	June 15	@ Marlins	1–2	Koehler (5–4)	Tanaka (4–2)	Ramos (9)	33,961	34–29
64	June 16	@ Marlins	2–12	Phelps (4–3)	Eovaldi (5–2)	–	33,083	34–30
65	June 17	Marlins	2–1	Pineda (8–3)	Ureña (1–3)	Betances (4)	43,048	35–30
66	June 18	Marlins	9–4	Shreve (4–1)	Dunn (1–4)	–	38,239	36–30
67	June 19	Tigers	7–2	Warren (5–4)	Verlander (0–1)	–	44,588	37–30
68	June 20	Tigers	14–3	Eovaldi (6–2)	Simón (7–4)	Mitchell (1)	48,092	38–30
69	June 21	Tigers	4–12	Sánchez (6–7)	Tanaka (4–3)	–	38,691	38–31
70	June 22	Phillies	8–11	Diekman (2–1)	Pineda (8–4)	–	36,883	38–32
71	June 23	Phillies	6–11	Giles (3–1)	Betances (4–1)	–	36,198	38–33
72	June 24	Phillies	10–2	Nova (1–0)	Hamels (5–6)	–	45,877	39–33
73	June 25	@ Astros	0–4	Keuchel (9–3)	Warren (5–5)	–	28,643	39–34
74	June 26	@ Astros	3–2	Eovaldi (7–2)	Harris (4–1)	Betances (5)	37,748	40–34
75	June 27	@ Astros	9–6	Shreve (5–1)	Neshek (3–1)	Betances (6)	41,133	41–34
76	June 28	@ Astros	1–3	McHugh (9–3)	Pineda (8–5)	Gregerson (18)	31,961	41–35
77	June 29	@ Angels	1–4	Wilson (6–6)	Sabathia (3–8)	Street (22)	42,056	41–36
78	June 30	@ Angels	1–2	Heaney (1–0)	Nova (1–1)	Street (23)	42,036	41–37

July (17–7) Home: 9–3 Away: 8–4

#	Date	Opponent	Score	Win	Loss	Save	Attendance	Record
79	July 1	@ Angels	3–1	Eovaldi (8–2)	Shoemaker (4–7)	Betances (7)	40,938	42–37
80	July 3	Rays	7–5 (12)	Shreve (6–1)	Geltz (1–4)	–	43,141	43–37
81	July 4	Rays	3–2	Betances (5–1)	Boxberger (4–4)	–	35,508	44–37
82	July 5	Rays	1–8	Ramírez (7–3)	Nova (1–2)	–	35,050	44–38
83	July 7	Athletics	3–4 (10)	Pomeranz (3–3)	Betances (5–2)	Clippard (16)	32,337	44–39
84	July 8	Athletics	5–4	Sabathia (4–8)	Scribner (2–2)	Miller (18)	41,626	45–39
85	July 9	Athletics	6–2	Tanaka (5–3)	Chavez (4–9)	–	40,084	46–39
86	July 10	@ Red Sox	5–1	Pineda (9–5)	Buchholz (7–7)	–	37,984	47–39
87	July 11	@ Red Sox	3–5	Rodríguez (5–2)	Nova (1–3)	Uehara (22)	38,047	47–40
88	July 12	@ Red Sox	8–6	Eovaldi (9–2)	Miley (8–8)	–	37,283	48–40
–	July 14	86th All-Star Game	National League vs. American League (Great American Ball Park, Cincinnati) AL defeats NL, 6–3					
89	July 17	Mariners	4–3	Tanaka (6–3)	Beimel (0–1)	Miller (19)	47,086	49–40
90	July 18	Mariners	3–4	Iwakuma (2–1)	Pineda (9–6)	Smith (7)	46,119	49–41
91	July 19	Mariners	2–1	Betances (6–2)	Rodney (2–4)	Miller (20)	42,926	50–41
92	July 21	Orioles	3–2	Wilson (3–0)	Chen (4–6)	Miller (21)	37,993	51–41
93	July 22	Orioles	4–3	Nova (2–3)	Gausman (1–2)	Miller (22)	43,887	52–41
94	July 23	Orioles	9–3	Tanaka (7–3)	Jiménez (7–6)	–	46,875	53–41
95	July 24	@ Twins	1–10	Hughes (9–6)	Pineda (9–7)	–	34,334	53–42
96	July 25	@ Twins	8–5	Warren (6–5)	Perkins (0–2)	Miller (23)	40,660	54–42
97	July 26	@ Twins	7–2	Eovaldi (10–2)	Gibson (8–8)	–	37,391	55–42
98	July 27	@ Rangers	6–2	Nova (3–3)	Harrison (1–2)	–	33,691	56–42
99	July 28	@ Rangers	21–5	Moreno (1–0)	Pérez (0–2)	Warren (1)	28,403	57–42
100	July 29	@ Rangers	2–5	Lewis (11–4)	Tanaka (7–4)	Tolleson (18)	31,658	57–43
101	July 30	@ Rangers	6–7	Tolleson (3–2)	Miller (0–2)	–	34,407	57–44
102	July 31	@ White Sox	13–6	Eovaldi (11–2)	Rodon (4–4)	–	30,359	58–44

August (14–14) Home: 7–9 Away: 7–5

#	Date	Opponent	Score	Win	Loss	Save	Attendance	Record
103	August 1	@ White Sox	2–8	Danks (6–8)	Mitchell (0–1)	–	34,379	58–45
104	August 2	@ White Sox	12–3	Nova (4–3)	Samardzija (8–6)	–	38,840	59–45
105	August 4	Red Sox	13–3	Tanaka (8–4)	Owens (0–1)	–	48,522	60–45
106	August 5	Red Sox	1–2	Wright (5–4)	Severino (0–1)	Uehara (24)	47,489	60–46
107	August 6	Red Sox	2–1	Wilson (4–0)	Rodríguez (6–4)	Miller (24)	48,608	61–46
108	August 7	Blue Jays	1–2 (10)	Cecil (3–4)	Pinder (0–1)	Osuna (9)	42,839	61–47
109	August 8	Blue Jays	0–6	Price (11–4)	Nova (4–4)	–	45,255	61–48
110	August 9	Blue Jays	0–2	Estrada (10–6)	Tanaka (8–5)	Osuna (10)	42,034	61–49
111	August 11	@ Indians	4–5 (16)	Adams (2–0)	Pinder (0–2)	–	23,618	61–50
112	August 12	@ Indians	1–2	Salazar (10–6)	Sabathia (4–9)	Allen (23)	18,844	61–51
113	August 13	@ Indians	8–6	Eovaldi (12–2)	Bauer (9–9)	Miller (25)	23,076	62–51
114	August 14	@ Blue Jays	4–3	Nova (5–4)	Sanchez (6–5)	Miller (26)	46,689	63–51
115	August 15	@ Blue Jays	4–1	Tanaka (9–5)	Estrada (10–7)	–	46,630	64–51
116	August 16	@ Blue Jays	1–3	Hutchison (12–2)	Severino (0–2)	Osuna (13)	46,792	64–52
117	August 17	Twins	8–7 (10)	Miller (1–2)	Perkins (1–4)	–	38,943	65–52
118	August 18	Twins	8–4	Rumbelow (1–0)	Graham (0–1)	Miller (27)	38,007	66–52
119	August 19	Twins	4–3	Eovaldi (13–2)	Santana (2–4)	Betances (8)	38,086	67–52
120	August 20	Indians	2–3	Tomlin (1–1)	Nova (5–5)	Allen (24)	36,129	67–53
121	August 21	Indians	3–7	Carrasco (12–9)	Tanaka (9–6)	Allen (25)	35,940	67–54
122	August 22	Indians	6–2	Severino (1–2)	Salazar (11–7)	–	47,031	68–54
123	August 23	Indians	3–4	Shaw (2–2)	Betances (6–3)	Allen (26)	46,945	68–55
124	August 24	Astros	1–0	Miller (2–2)	Pérez (2–2)	–	37,125	69–55
125	August 25	Astros	1–15	Keuchel (15–6)	Nova (5–6)	–	38,015	69–56
126	August 26	Astros	2–6	McHugh (14–7)	Pineda (9–8)	–	37,259	69–57
127	August 28	@ Braves	15–3	Tanaka (10–6)	Pérez (4–5)	–	35,546	70–57
128	August 29	@ Braves	3–1	Severino (2–2)	Wisler (5–5)	Miller (28)	49,243	71–57
129	August 30	@ Braves	20–6	Eovaldi (14–2)	Teherán (9–7)	–	33,093	72–57
130	August 31	@ Red Sox	3–4	Rodríguez (8–5)	Nova (5–7)	Machi (4)	36,148	72–58

September (14–14) Home: 7–10 Away: 7–4

#	Date	Opponent	Score	Win	Loss	Save	Attendance	Record
131	September 1	@ Red Sox	3–1	Pineda (10–8)	Porcello (6–12)	Miller (29)	35,077	73–58
132	September 2	@ Red Sox	13–8	Tanaka (11–6)	Owens (2–2)		34,416	74–58
133	September 4	Rays	5–2	Severino (3–2)	Odorizzi (6–8)	Miller (30)	32,530	75–58
134	September 5	Rays	2–3	Cedeño (4–1)	Eovaldi (14–3)	Boxberger (34)	35,030	75–59
135	September 6	Rays	6–4	Nova (6–7)	Archer (12–11)	Miller (31)	35,299	76–59
136	September 7	Orioles	8–6	Wilson (5–0)	Rondón (0–1)	Miller (32)	31,039	77–59
137	September 8	Orioles	1–2	O'Day (6–2)	Shreve (6–2)	Britton (31)	30,785	77–60
138	September 9	Orioles	3–5	Jiménez (11–9)	Warren (6–6)	Britton (32)	30,038	77–61
－	September 10	Blue Jays	Postponed (rain). Makeup date: September 12.					
139	September 11	Blue Jays	5–11	Price (15–5)	Severino (3–3)	–	40,220	77–62
140	September 12	Blue Jays	5–9 (11)	Hendriks (5–0)	Mitchell (0–2)	Tepera (1)		77–63
141	September 12	Blue Jays	7–10	Stroman (1–0)	Nova (6–8)	Lowe (1)	46,278	77–64
142	September 13	Blue Jays	5–0	Tanaka (12–6)	Dickey (10–11)	–	39,127	78–64
143	September 14	@ Rays	4–1	Cotham (1–0)	Boxberger (4–10)	Miller (33)	11,940	79–64
144	September 15	@ Rays	3–6	Odorizzi (8–8)	Rumbelow (1–1)	Gomes (1)	13,539	79–65
145	September 16	@ Rays	3–1	Severino (4–3)	Archer (12–12)	Miller (34)	13,299	80–65
146	September 18	@ Mets	1–5	Matz (4–0)	Tanaka (12–7)	–	43,602	80–66
147	September 19	@ Mets	5–0	Pineda (11–8)	Syndergaard (8–7)	–	43,630	81–66
148	September 20	@ Mets	11–2	Sabathia (5–9)	Robles (4–3)	–	43,571	82–66
149	September 21	@ Blue Jays	2–4	Price (17–5)	Warren (6–7)	Osuna (17)	47,648	82–67
150	September 22	@ Blue Jays	6–4 (10)	Miller (3–2)	Lowe (1–3)	–	47,992	83–67
151	September 23	@ Blue Jays	0–4	Stroman (3–0)	Nova (6–9)	–	48,056	83–68
152	September 24	White Sox	3–2	Pineda (12–8)	Sale (12–11)	Miller (35)	35,132	84–68
153	September 25	White Sox	2–5	Rodon (9–6)	Sabathia (5–10)	Robertson (32)	37,316	84–69
154	September 26	White Sox	2–1	Warren (7–7)	Danks (7–14)	Miller (36)	39,134	85–69
155	September 27	White Sox	6–1	Severino (5–3)	Johnson (3–1)	–	38,690	86–69
156	September 28	Red Sox	1–5	Rodríguez (10–6)	Nova (6–10)	–	39,476	86–70
157	September 29	Red Sox	4–10	Porcello (9–14)	Pineda (12–9)	–	38,512	86–71
158	September 30	Red Sox	5–9 (11)	Ogando (3–1)	Bailey (0–1)	–	39,328	86–72

October (1–3) Home: 1–0 Away: 0–3

#	Date	Opponent	Score	Win	Loss	Save	Attendance	Record
159	October 1	Red Sox	4–1	Sabathia (6–10)	Hill (2–1)	Betances (9)	40,033	87–72
－	October 2	@ Orioles	Postponed (rain). Makeup date October 3 as part of doubleheader.					
160	October 3	@ Orioles	2–9	Chen (11–8)	Nova (6–11)	–	29,227	87–73
161	October 3	@ Orioles	3–4	McFarland (2–2)	Betances (6–4)	Britton (36)	35,198	87–74
162	October 4	@ Orioles	4–9	Tillman (11–11)	Pineda (12–10)	–	33,224	87–75

== Postseason ==
=== Game log ===
Legend
Yankees Win	Yankees Loss	Game postponed

2015 Postseason Game Log (0–1)
ALWC vs Astros (0–1)

#	Date	Opponent	Score	Win	Loss	Save	Attendance	Record
1	October 6	Astros	0–3	Keuchel (1–0)	Tanaka (0–1)	Gregerson (1)	50,113	0–1

=== Postseason rosters ===
Playoff rosters
American League Wild Card Game

- Pitchers: 19 Masahiro Tanaka 40 Luis Severino 41 Justin Wilson 43 Adam Warren 47 Iván Nova 48 Andrew Miller 55 Bryan Mitchell 67 James Pazos 68 Dellin Betances
- Catchers: 34 Brian McCann 66 John Ryan Murphy 73 Gary Sánchez
- Infielders: 12 Chase Headley 17 Brendan Ryan 18 Didi Gregorius 29 Dustin Ackley 31 Greg Bird 64 Rob Refsnyder
- Outfielders: 11 Brett Gardner 22 Jacoby Ellsbury 24 Chris Young 36 Carlos Beltrán 55 Slade Heathcott 70 Rico Noel
- Designated hitters: 13 Alex Rodriguez

== Statistics ==
=== Batting ===
Note: G = Games played; AB = At bats; R = Runs scored; H = Hits; 2B = Doubles; 3B = Triples; HR = Home runs; RBI = Runs batted in; BB = Base on balls; SO = Strikeouts; AVG = Batting average; SB = Stolen bases

Player	G	AB	R	H	2B	3B	HR	RBI	BB	SO	AVG	SB
Dustin Ackley, 2B, 1B, LF	23	52	6	15	3	2	4	11	4	7	.288	0
Carlos Beltrán, RF	133	478	57	132	34	1	19	67	45	85	.276	0
Greg Bird, 1B	46	157	26	41	9	0	11	31	19	53	.261	0
Chris Capuano, P	22	1	0	0	0	0	0	0	0	0	.000	0
Stephen Drew, 2B	131	383	43	77	16	1	17	44	37	71	.201	0
Jacoby Ellsbury, CF	111	452	66	116	15	2	7	33	35	86	.257	21
Nathan Eovaldi, P	27	5	1	0	0	0	0	0	0	2	.000	0
Cole Figueroa, 3B	2	8	2	2	2	0	0	0	0	0	.250	0
Ramón Flores, OF	12	32	3	7	1	0	0	0	0	4	.219	0
Brett Gardner, LF	151	571	94	148	26	3	16	66	68	135	.259	20
Didi Gregorius, SS	155	525	57	139	24	2	9	56	33	85	.265	5
Chase Headley, 3B	156	580	74	150	29	1	11	62	51	135	.259	0
Slade Heathcott, OF	17	25	6	10	2	0	2	8	2	5	.400	0
Garrett Jones, RF, 1B, DH	57	144	12	31	4	1	5	17	8	37	.215	0
Brian McCann, C	135	465	68	108	15	1	26	94	52	97	.232	0
Bryan Mitchell, P	20	1	0	0	0	0	0	0	0	1	.000	0
John Ryan Murphy, C	67	155	21	43	9	1	3	14	12	43	.277	0
Rico Noel, DH, OF	15	2	5	1	0	0	0	0	0	0	.500	5
Gregorio Petit, 2B, 3B	20	42	7	7	3	0	5	5	3	16	.167	0
Branden Pinder, P	25	1	0	1	1	0	0	1	0	0	1.000	0
Michael Pineda, P	27	2	0	0	0	0	0	0	0	1	.000	0
José Pirela, 2B	37	74	7	17	3	0	1	5	2	16	.230	1
Rob Refsnyder, 2B	16	43	3	13	3	0	2	5	3	7	.302	2
Alex Rodriguez, DH, 3B	151	523	83	131	22	1	33	86	84	145	.250	4
Austin Romine, 1B	1	2	0	0	0	0	0	0	0	0	.000	0
Brendan Ryan, 2B, SS, 3B	103	96	10	22	6	2	0	8	5	29	.229	0
CC Sabathia, P	29	3	0	0	0	0	0	0	0	2	.000	0
Gary Sánchez, PH	2	2	0	0	0	0	0	0	0	1	.000	0
Luis Severino, P	11	2	0	0	0	0	0	0	0	1	.000	0
Masahiro Tanaka, P	24	7	0	0	0	0	0	0	1	2	.000	0
Mark Teixeira, 1B	111	392	57	100	22	0	31	79	59	85	.255	2
Adam Warren, P	43	3	0	0	0	0	0	0	0	1	.000	0
Mason Williams, CF	8	21	3	6	3	0	1	3	1	3	.286	0
Chris Young, OF	140	318	53	80	20	1	14	42	30	73	.252	3
Team totals	162	5567	764	1397	272	19	212	737	554	1227	.251	63

=== Pitching ===
Note: W = Wins; L = Losses; ERA = Earned run average; G = Games pitched; GS = Games started; SV = Saves; IP = Innings pitched; H = Hits allowed; R = Runs allowed; ER = Earned runs allowed; HR = Home runs allowed; BB = Walks allowed; K = Strikeouts

Player	W	L	ERA	G	GS	SV	IP	H	R	ER	HR	BB	K
Andrew Bailey	0	1	8.31	10	0	0	8.2	10	8	8	2	5	6
Dellin Betances	6	4	1.50	74	0	9	84.0	45	17	14	6	40	131
Danny Burawa	0	0	54.00	1	0	0	0.2	3	4	4	1	0	1
Chris Capuano	0	4	7.97	22	4	0	40.2	52	38	36	6	22	38
David Carpenter	0	1	4.82	22	0	0	18.2	20	11	10	3	7	11
Caleb Cotham	1	0	6.52	12	0	0	9.2	14	7	7	4	1	11
Kyle Davies	0	0	0.00	1	0	0	2.1	3	0	0	0	0	2
José de Paula	0	0	2.70	1	0	0	3.1	2	1	1	1	4	2
Nathan Eovaldi	14	3	4.20	27	27	0	154.1	175	72	72	10	49	121
Nick Goody	0	0	4.76	7	0	0	5.2	6	3	3	0	3	3
Garrett Jones	0	0	0.00	1	0	0	0.2	0	0	0	0	1	0
Jacob Lindgren	0	0	5.14	7	0	0	7.0	5	4	4	3	4	8
Chris Martin	0	2	5.66	24	0	1	20.2	28	13	13	2	6	18
Andrew Miller	3	2	2.04	60	0	36	61.2	33	16	14	5	20	100
Bryan Mitchell	0	2	6.37	20	2	1	29.2	37	24	21	4	16	29
Diego Moreno	1	0	5.23	4	0	0	10.1	9	6	6	1	3	8
Iván Nova	6	11	5.07	17	17	0	94.0	99	54	53	13	33	63
James Pazos	0	0	0.00	11	0	0	5.0	3	0	0	0	3	3
Branden Pinder	0	2	2.93	25	0	0	27.2	28	9	9	4	14	25
Michael Pineda	12	10	4.37	27	27	0	160.2	176	83	78	21	21	156
José Ramírez	0	0	15.00	3	0	0	3.0	6	5	5	0	4	2
Esmil Rogers	1	1	6.27	18	0	0	33.0	41	29	23	5	14	31
Nick Rumbelow	1	1	4.02	17	0	0	15.2	16	8	7	2	5	15
Brendan Ryan	0	0	0.00	1	0	0	2.0	2	0	0	0	0	0
CC Sabathia	6	10	4.73	29	29	0	167.1	188	92	88	28	50	137
Sergio Santos	0	0	6.00	2	0	0	3.0	3	2	2	1	0	3
Luis Severino	5	3	2.89	11	11	0	62.1	53	21	20	9	22	56
Chasen Shreve	6	2	3.09	59	0	0	58.1	49	21	20	10	33	64
Masahiro Tanaka	12	7	3.51	24	24	0	154.0	126	66	60	25	27	139
Matt Tracy	0	0	0.00	1	0	0	2.0	2	3	0	0	2	1
Adam Warren	7	7	3.29	43	17	1	131.1	114	51	48	10	39	104
Chase Whitley	1	2	4.19	4	4	0	19.1	20	9	9	3	5	16
Justin Wilson	5	0	3.10	74	0	0	61.0	49	21	21	3	20	66
Team totals	87	75	4.03	162	162	48	1457.2	1416	698	652	182	474	1370

== Awards ==
- Mariano Rivera AL Reliever of the Year: Andrew Miller
- Thurman Munson Award as New York Yankees Premier Closer: Andrew Miller

== Farm system ==
Level	Team	League	Manager
AAA	Scranton/Wilkes-Barre RailRiders	International League	Dave Miley
AA	Trenton Thunder	Eastern League	Al Pedrique
A	Tampa Yankees	Florida State League	Dave Bialas
A	Charleston RiverDogs	South Atlantic League	Luis Dorante
A-Short Season	Staten Island Yankees	New York–Penn League	Pat Osborn
Rookie	Pulaski Yankees	Appalachian League	Tony Franklin
Rookie	GCL Yankees	Gulf Coast League	Julio Mosquera
