= Branden Pinder =

American baseball player (born 1989)

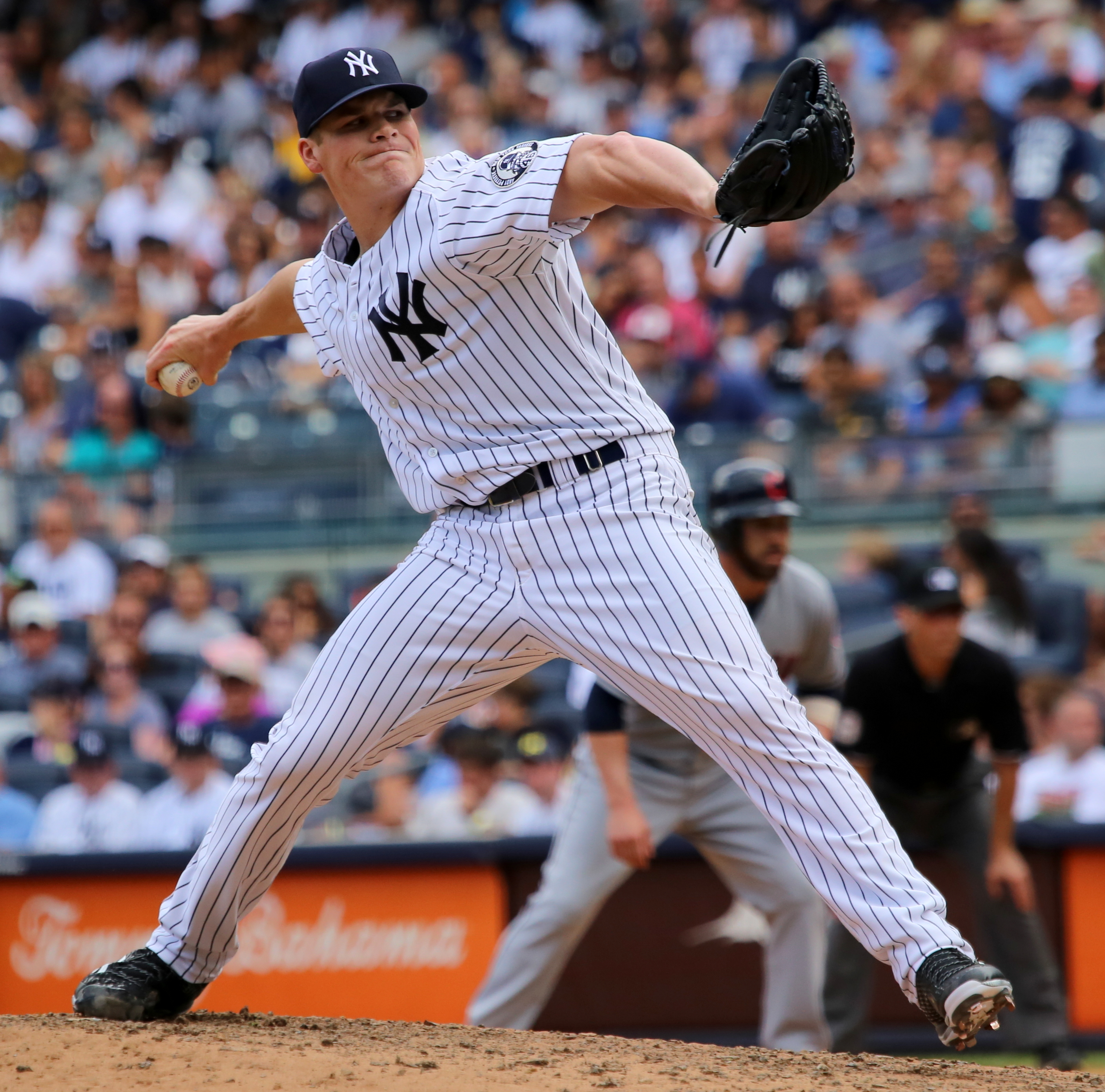
- Pinder pitching for the New York Yankees in 2015
- Pitcher
- Born: January 26, 1989 (age 37); Corona, California, U.S.
- Batted: Right Threw: Right

MLB debut
- April 15, 2015, for the New York Yankees

Last appearance
- April 20, 2016, for the New York Yankees

MLB statistics
- Win–loss record: 0–2
- Earned run average: 3.45
- Strikeouts: 26
- Stats at Baseball Reference

Teams
- New York Yankees (2015–2016)

Branden Henry Pinder (born January 26, 1989) is an American former professional baseball pitcher. He played in Major League Baseball for the New York Yankees in 2015 and 2016.

== Career ==
=== Amateur and Minors ===
Pinder played college baseball at Santa Ana College and Long Beach State University. He was drafted by the New York Yankees in the 16th round of the 2011 Major League Baseball draft. He made his professional debut for the Staten Island Yankees that season. In 31 innings over 24 games, he was 2–2 with a 1.16 earned run average (ERA), 14 saves and 38 strikeouts. Pinder played 2012 with the Tampa Yankees and pitched in one game for the Trenton Thunder. He was 2–6 with a 2.74 ERA, nine saves and 67 strikeouts in 69 innings. He played the 2013 season with Tampa and Trenton. He had a 2–3 record, 4.42 ERA, six saves and 72 strikeouts in 73 1/3 innings. Pinder started the 2014 season back with Trenton. After recording a 0.56 ERA through 16 innings to start the season, he was promoted to the Scranton/Wilkes-Barre RailRiders.

=== New York Yankees ===
On April 15, 2015, Pinder made his major league debut against the Baltimore Orioles, going one inning and allowing one hit in a 7-5 loss. He was optioned to Triple-A on April 21 in exchange for Chasen Shreve. He was recalled on May 9 after Chris Martin was placed on the disabled list. He was sent back down on May 24 to make room for Jacob Lindgren. On June 19, Pinder was called up yet again after Martin was optioned to Triple-A, but was again sent down on June 25. He was again called up on July 18 and then demoted on July 25. Pinder was called up on August 2, sent down on August 12, and recalled on August 22. On August 30, Pinder collected his first major league hit, an RBI double, off Atlanta Braves pitcher Jake Brigham. It would be the only at-bat of his career, giving him a career batting average of 1.000. He finished the 2015 season by making 25 relief appearances with an 0-2 record and a 2.93 ERA.

On March 30, 2016, Pinder was cut from major league camp in spring training. He was called up on April 16. Pinder was placed on the 15-day disabled list with a right elbow strain on April 22. The next day, an MRI revealed that there was a partially torn UCL in the right elbow. After seeking a second opinion with Dr. James Andrews, Pinder decided to forgo the rest of the 2016 season as he chose to have Tommy John surgery. On November 8, Pinder was designated for assignment and outrighted to Triple-A. He began his rehab assignment on June 21, 2017. On July 27, he was released from the Yankees organization.

=== Los Angeles Angels ===
On August 3, 2017, Pinder signed a minor league contract with the Los Angeles Angels. He was invited to spring training in 2018. He was released on June 18, 2018.

=== Long Island Ducks ===
On June 25, 2018, Pinder signed with the Long Island Ducks of the Atlantic League of Professional Baseball. He announced his retirement on July 23, 2018. In 10 games 10 innings of relief he struggled terribly going 1-0 with a 9.90 ERA with 5 strikeouts.
