= Joe Espada =

Puerto Rican baseball coach (born 1975)

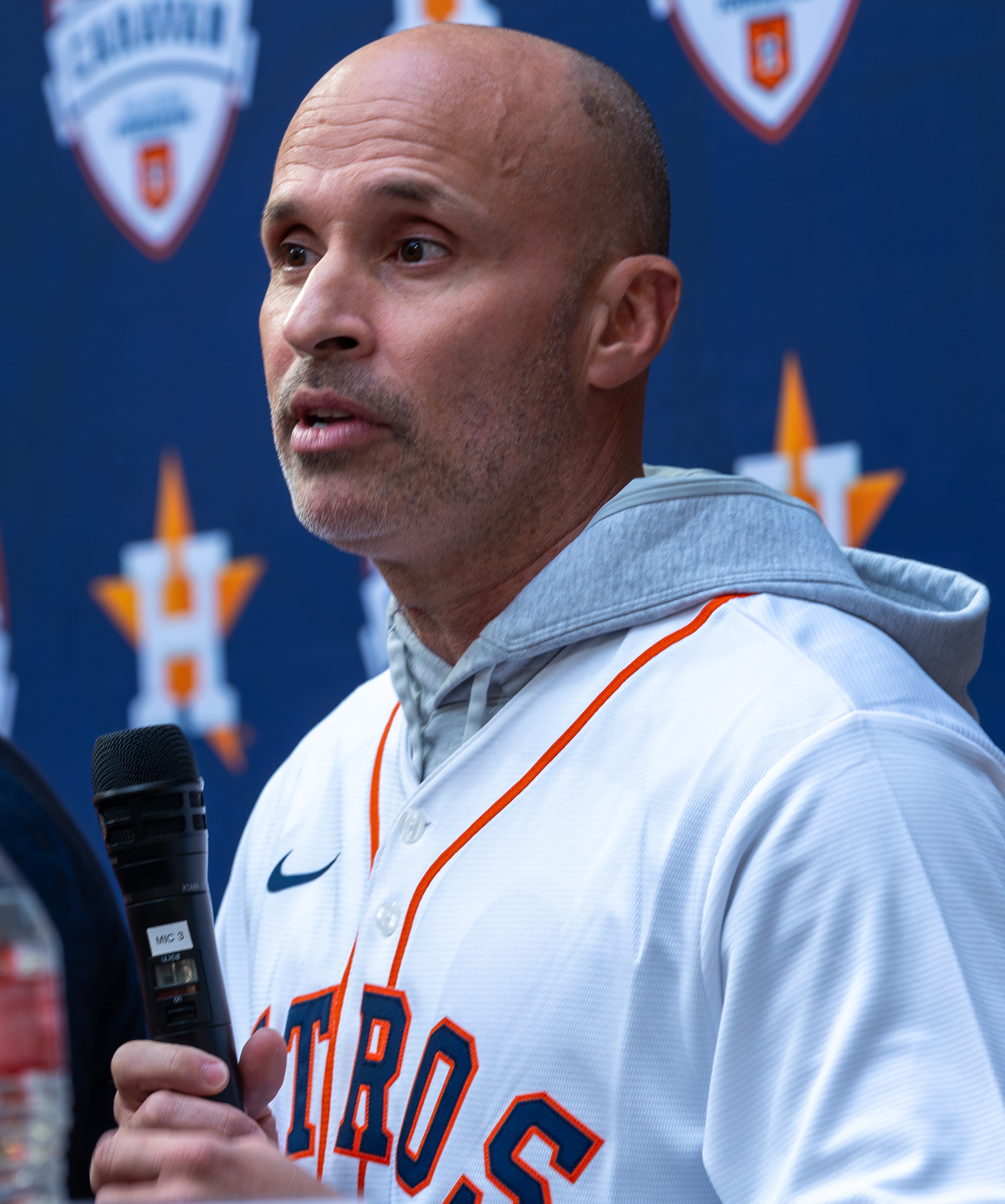
- Espada with the Houston Astros in 2024
- Manager
- Born: August 30, 1975 (age 51); Santurce, San Juan, Puerto Rico
- Bats: Right Throws: Right

Career statistics
- Managerial record: 256–229
- Winning %: .528
- Stats at Baseball Reference
- Managerial record at Baseball Reference

Teams
- As manager: Houston Astros (2024–2026); As coach: Florida / Miami Marlins (2010–2013); New York Yankees (2015–2017); Houston Astros (2018–2023)

Career highlights and awards
- World Series champion (2022)
Medals
Men's baseball
Representing Puerto Rico
World Baseball Classic
Silver medal – second place	2013 San Francisco	Team
Silver medal – second place	2017 Los Angeles	Team

Josue Espada (born August 30, 1975) is a Puerto Rican professional baseball coach who was most recently the manager of the Houston Astros of Major League Baseball (MLB). He previously coached in MLB for the Miami Marlins, New York Yankees, and the Astros. In international competition, Espada has coached for Puerto Rico, winning two silver medals in the World Baseball Classic (WBC).

From Santurce, Puerto Rico, Espada attended the University of Mobile, Alabama, where he played college baseball for the Mobile Rams. He was selected in the second round of the 1996 MLB draft by the Oakland Athletics and played in the A's minor league system until 2000. As a free agent the following year, Espada signed with the Florida Marlins and subsequently played in four other organizations and independent baseball, reaching as high as Triple-A with a total of five seasons at that level.

After his playing career, Espada became a coach in the Marlins organization and was promoted to be their major league third base coach from 2010 to 2013. He then joined the Yankees as a special assistant to the general manager in 2014. Prior to the 2015 season, the Yankees named Espada as third base coach. The Astros hired Espada as bench coach after the 2017 season, and promoted him to manager after the 2023 season.

== College and minor league playing career ==
Espada attended the University of Mobile, where he played college baseball for the Mobile Rams. He set a school record with a .442 batting average. The Oakland Athletics selected Espada in the second round, with the 45th overall selection, of the 1996 Major League Baseball draft.

The Minnesota Twins selected Espada from the Athletics in the 1998 Rule 5 draft, but he failed to make the Twins' Opening Day roster, and was returned to the Athletics. Espada played in Oakland's system through the 2000 season.

A free agent in 2001, Espada signed with the Florida Marlins organization, and was traded to the Colorado Rockies organization for Juan Acevedo in August 2001. He later played in the minor leagues for the Kansas City Royals, St. Louis Cardinals, Texas Rangers, and Tampa Bay Devil Rays organizations. In 2004, Espada played for the Pensacola Pelicans in the Central Baseball League, an independent baseball league. He retired as a player following the 2005 season, reaching Triple-A, but never playing in the majors.

== Coaching career ==
=== Florida / Miami Marlins ===
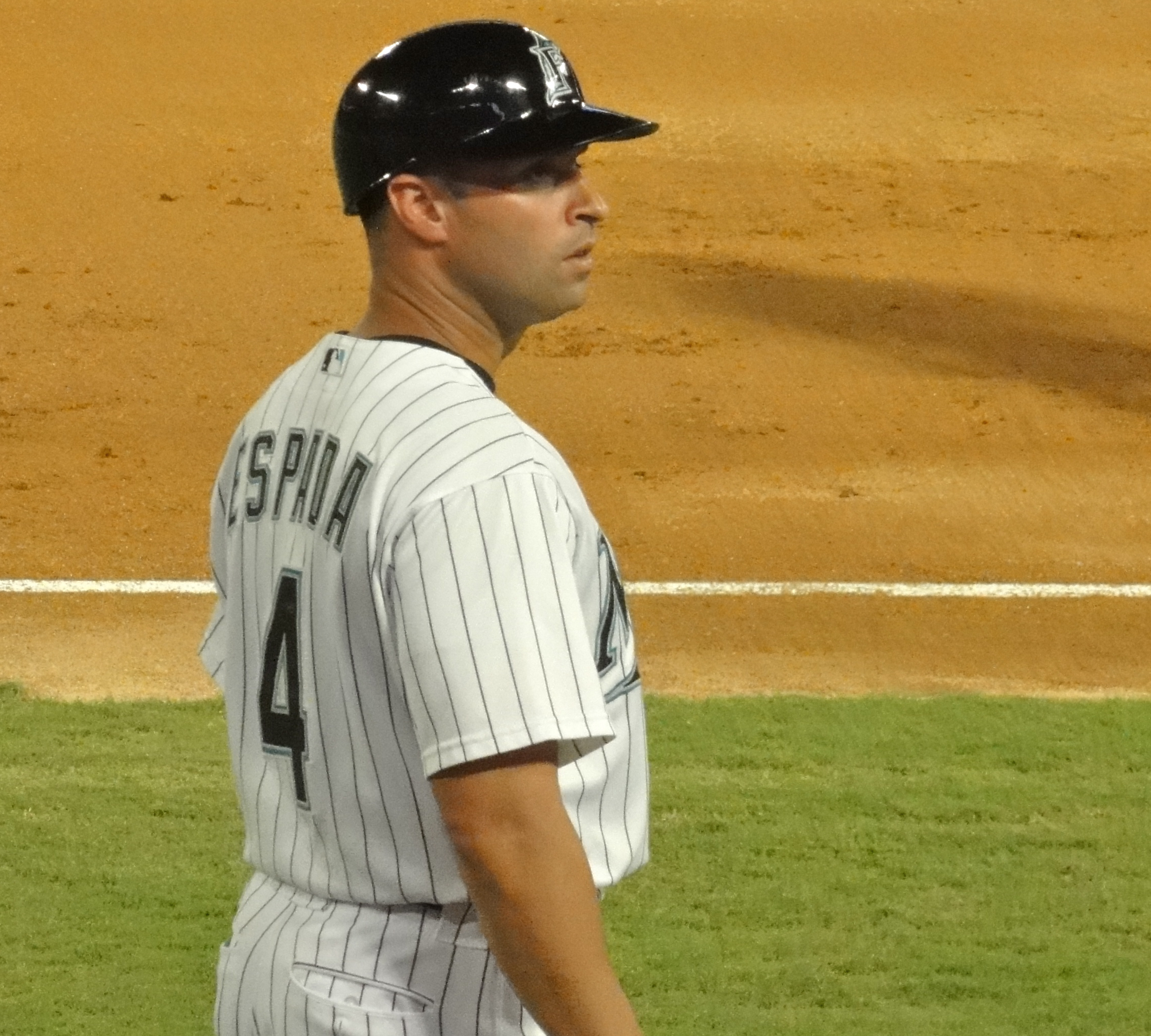
Espada with the Florida Marlins in 2011

After retiring, Espada became a coach in the Marlins' organization. He served as the hitting coach of the Greensboro Grasshoppers of the Class A South Atlantic League in 2006, and for the Jupiter Hammerheads of the Class A-Advanced Florida State League in 2007. Espada spent the next two seasons as the Marlins' minor league infield coordinator.

The Marlins named Espada their third base coach prior to the 2010 season. He had coached previously for the Puerto Rican national team during the 2013 World Baseball Classic (WBC). Espada served as the Marlins' third base coach through the 2013 season. After the season, he was reassigned to manage Jupiter, as the Marlins wanted Espada to gain managerial experience. Instead, Espada took a job with the New York Yankees as a special assistant to general manager Brian Cashman.

=== New York Yankees ===
On January 11, 2015, the Yankees hired Espada to be the team's infield coach and third base coach. He managed the Gigantes de Carolina of the Liga de Béisbol Profesional Roberto Clemente in winter baseball. Espada again coached the Puerto Rican team in the 2017 WBC.

=== Houston Astros ===
==== Coach ====
The Houston Astros hired Espada after the 2017 season to become their bench coach. He interviewed for the Texas Rangers' managerial position after the 2018 season and for the Chicago Cubs' managerial position after the 2019 season.

In 2022, the Astros advanced to the World Series and defeated the Philadelphia Phillies in six games to give Espada a World Series title.

==== Manager ====
On November 13, 2023, following the 2023 season, Espada was promoted to manage the Astros after the retirement of Dusty Baker, as 25th in franchise history. On April 1, 2024, Espada's first victory arrived via a no-hit effort from starting pitcher Ronel Blanco, the 17th such achievement in franchise history. Espada became the first manager in MLB history to earn his first win as a result of a no-hitter.

During Espada's first season as manager, the Astros produced a record of 12 games under .500 at two points in the season, and, on June 18, with a 33–40 record, were 10 games behind for the division lead, the largest margin by which the team had trailed since 2016. A seven-game winning streak ensued, and the Astros claimed their 40th win to reach .500 for the first time. On September 13, the Astros secured the 5,000th win in franchise history with a 5–3 victory over the Los Angeles Angels. The Astros clinched the American League (AL) West division title on September 24 with a 4–3 victory over the Seattle Mariners, Espada's first guiding a club as manager, as well as qualifying him for his first postseason entrance as manager. Additionally, it was the club's fourth consecutive division title, 14th in franchise history, and ninth postseason berth in 10 seasons. The Astros faced the Detroit Tigers in the AL Wild Card Series in Espada's first postseason experience as manager; however, the Tigers swept the Astros in the best-of-3 series.

Following the 2026 season, the Astros announced that they would not renew Espada's contract for the 2027 season.

== Managerial record ==
As of September 30, 2026

Team	Year	Regular season					Postseason			
Team	Year	Games	Won	Lost	Win %	Finish	Won	Lost	Win %	Result
HOU	2024	161	88	73	.547	1st in AL West	0	2	.000	Lost ALWCS (DET)
HOU	2025	162	87	75	.537	2nd in AL West	–	–	–	–
HOU	2026	162	81	81	.500	1st in AL West	0	2	.000	Lost ALWCS (CWS)
Total		485	256	229	.528		0	4	.000	

== Personal life ==
He was born in San Juan, Puerto Rico.

Espada is married to Pamela Dearth, the sister of Brandon Hyde's wife. The Espadas live in Fulshear, Texas, with their two daughters.

Sporting positions
Preceded by Rob Thomson	New York Yankees third base coach 2015–2017	Succeeded by Phil Nevin
Preceded by Alex Cora	Houston Astros bench coach 2018–2023	Succeeded by Omar López
