= José Ramírez (pitcher) =

Dominican baseball player (born 1990)

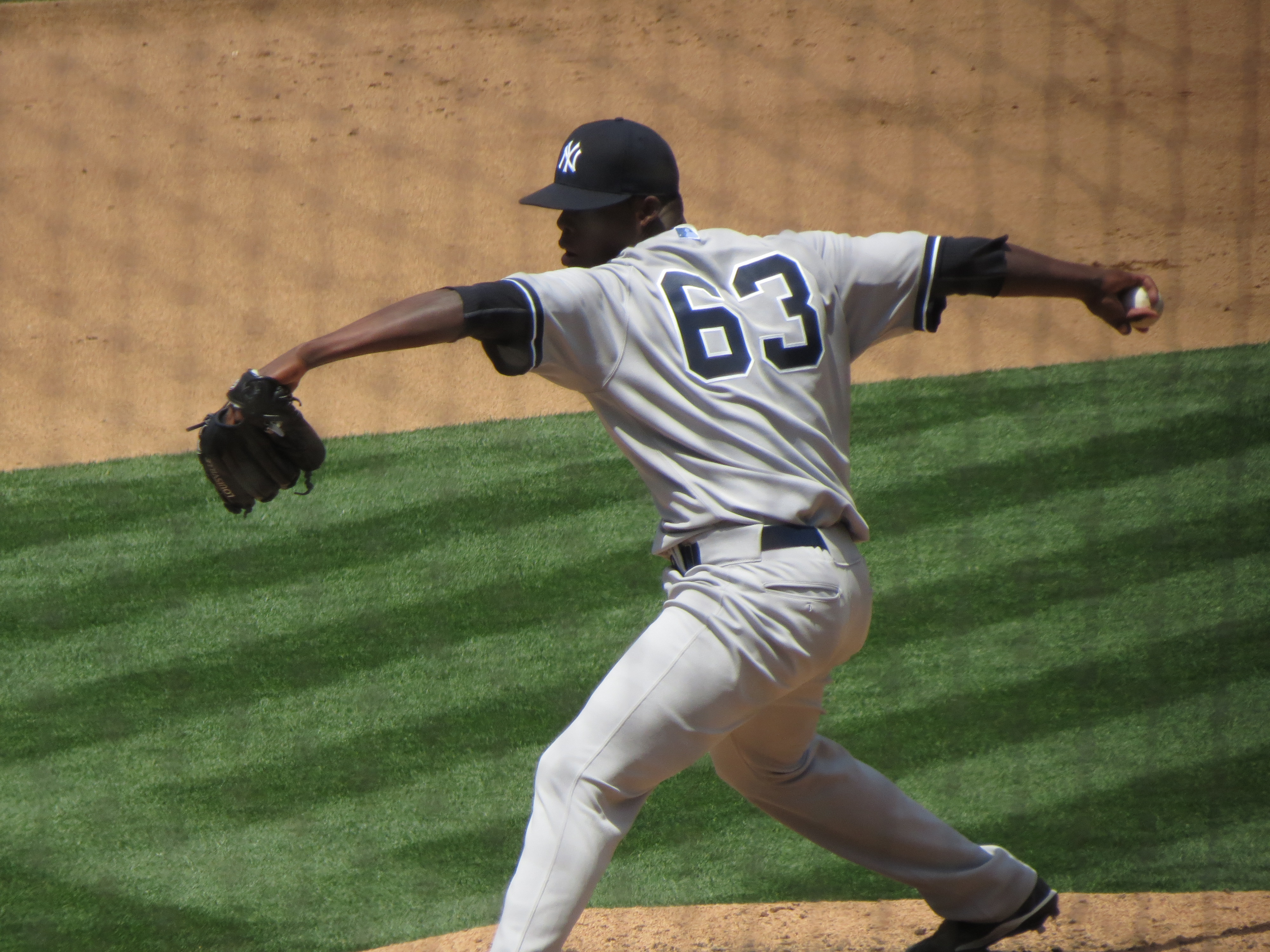
- Ramírez with the New York Yankees in 2014
- Pitcher
- Born: January 21, 1990 (age 36); Yaguate, San Cristóbal, Dominican Republic
- Batted: Right Threw: Right

MLB debut
- June 4, 2014, for the New York Yankees

Last MLB appearance
- April 17, 2018, for the Atlanta Braves

MLB statistics
- Win–loss record: 5–9
- Earned run average: 4.85
- Strikeouts: 111
- Stats at Baseball Reference

Teams
- New York Yankees (2014–2015); Seattle Mariners (2015); Atlanta Braves (2016–2018)

José Altagracia Ramírez (born January 21, 1990) is a Dominican former professional baseball pitcher. He played in Major League Baseball (MLB) for the New York Yankees, Seattle Mariners, and Atlanta Braves.

== Early life ==
José Ramírez was born on January 21, 1990, in Yaguate, Dominican Republic.

== Career ==
=== New York Yankees ===
Ramírez signed with the New York Yankees as an amateur free agent in 2007. Pitching for the Tampa Yankees of the High-A Florida State League in 2012, Ramírez had a 3.19 earned run average in 98 2/3 innings pitched. The Yankees added him to their 40-man roster on November 20, in order to protect him from being eligible in the upcoming Rule 5 Draft.

At the end of spring training the following year, the Yankees assigned Ramírez to the Trenton Thunder of the Double-A Eastern League. In 2013, Ramirez pitched for Trenton and the Scranton/Wilkes-Barre RailRiders of the Triple-A International League. He missed playing time due to an injury that was thought to be an oblique injury.

At the close of spring training in 2014, the Yankees decided to transition Ramírez from a starting pitcher to a relief pitcher as a result of injuries suffered earlier in his career. The Yankees promoted Ramírez to the major leagues on May 18 as the 26th man on their roster for a doubleheader, but he did not pitch and was optioned back to Scranton/Wilkes-Barre after the games. The Yankees promoted Ramírez again on June 4. He debuted against the Oakland Athletics that day by pitching two innings, yielding two hits and one run. After being sent down, he was called up again on June 13. In 2014, he was 0–2 with a 5.40 ERA for the Yankees, and in 2015 he was 0–0 with a 15.00 ERA.

=== Seattle Mariners ===
On July 30, 2015, the Yankees traded Ramírez and Ramón Flores to the Seattle Mariners for Dustin Ackley. In 2015, he was 1-0 for Seattle with an 11.57 ERA.

=== Atlanta Braves ===
On December 4, 2015, the Mariners traded Ramírez to the Atlanta Braves for a player to be named later, who eventually became relief pitcher Ryne Harper. He was designated for assignment on April 11, 2016. He was assigned to the Triple–A Gwinnett Braves three days later, and, on June 30, he, Rob Wooten, and Matt Marksberry pitched a combined no-hitter. He was recalled on July 28.

On September 14, 2016, Ramírez was ejected for the first time in his Major League career for throwing a pitch over the head of José Fernández. Two days later, the MLB Disciplinary Committee suspended Ramírez three games. He dropped an appeal of the decision and began serving the suspension on September 21. In 2016, he was 2-2 for the Braves, with a 3.58 ERA. The following season he spent the entire season in the Braves bullpen, appearing in 68 games and finishing with a 2–3 record with 3.19 ERA. The Braves outrighted him to the minors on October 31, 2018. Bell elected free agency on November 2.

=== Sugar Land Skeeters ===
On February 5, 2020, Ramírez signed with the Sugar Land Skeeters of the Atlantic League of Professional Baseball. Ramírez did not play a game for the team due to the cancellation of the ALPB season because of the COVID-19 pandemic and became a free agent after the year.

=== New Jersey Jackals ===
On February 18, 2022, Ramírez signed with the New Jersey Jackals of the Frontier League. He made 21 appearances for the Jackals, logging a 4–3 record and 3.00 ERA with 48 strikeouts across 27 innings of work. Ramírez became a free agent following the season.
