= Gregorio Petit =

Venezuelan baseball player and manager (born 1984)

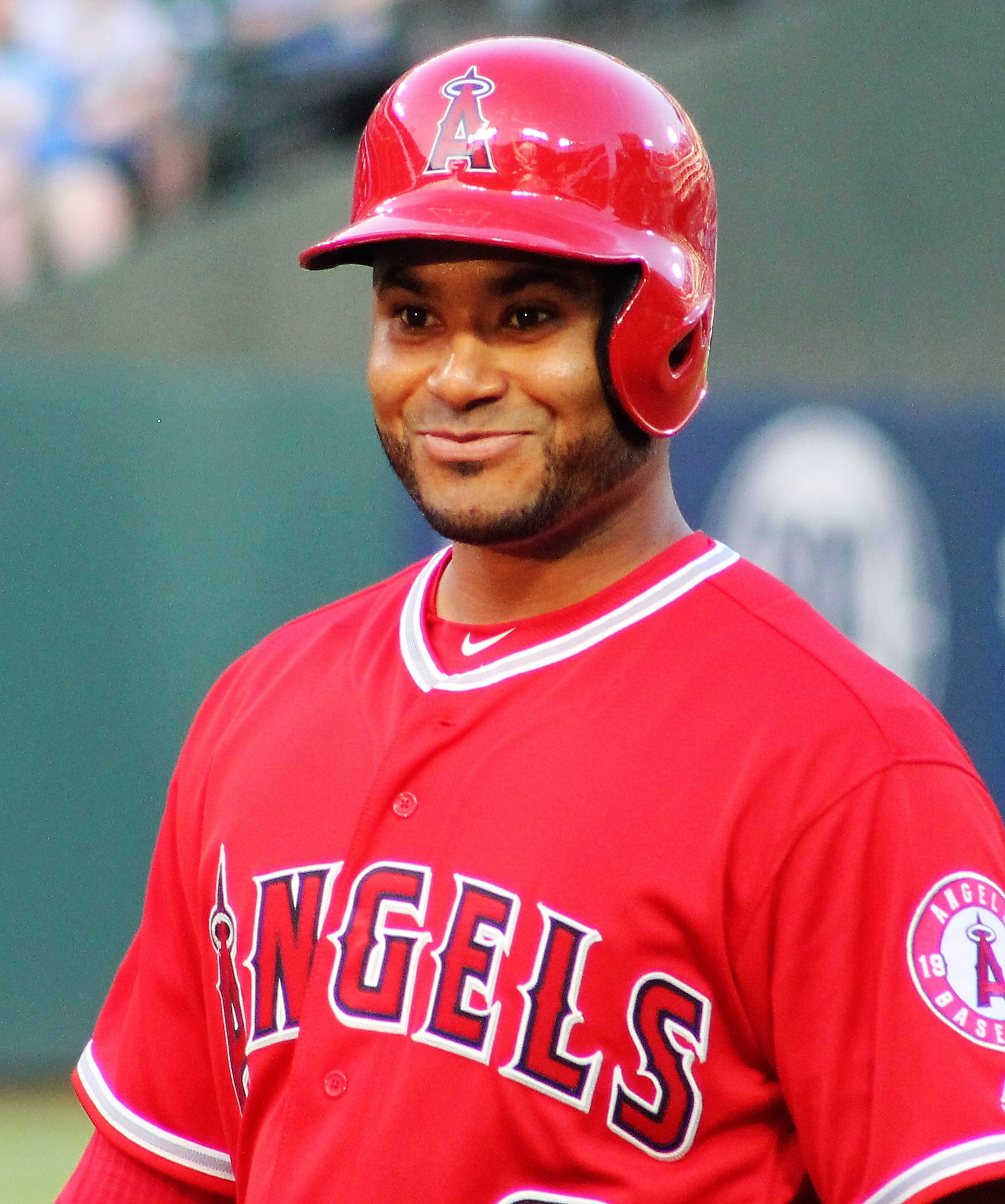
- Petit with the Los Angeles Angels of Anaheim
- Infielder / Manager
- Born: December 10, 1984 (age 41); Ocumare del Tuy, Venezuela
- Batted: Right Threw: Right

MLB debut
- May 18, 2008, for the Oakland Athletics

Last MLB appearance
- September 28, 2018, for the Minnesota Twins

MLB statistics
- Batting average: .249
- Home runs: 4
- Runs batted in: 35
- Stats at Baseball Reference

Teams
- Oakland Athletics (2008–2009); Houston Astros (2014); New York Yankees (2015); Los Angeles Angels (2016); Minnesota Twins (2018)

Gregorio Jesus Petit (born December 10, 1984) is a Venezuelan professional baseball former infielder and current manager for the Midland Rockhounds of the Texas League. Petit made his major league debut in 2008 with the Oakland Athletics. He played in Major League Baseball (MLB) for the Athletics, Houston Astros, New York Yankees, Los Angeles Angels, and Minnesota Twins.

== Playing career ==
=== Oakland Athletics ===
Petit was signed by the Oakland Athletics as an undrafted international free agent on July 17, 2001, at 16 years of age.

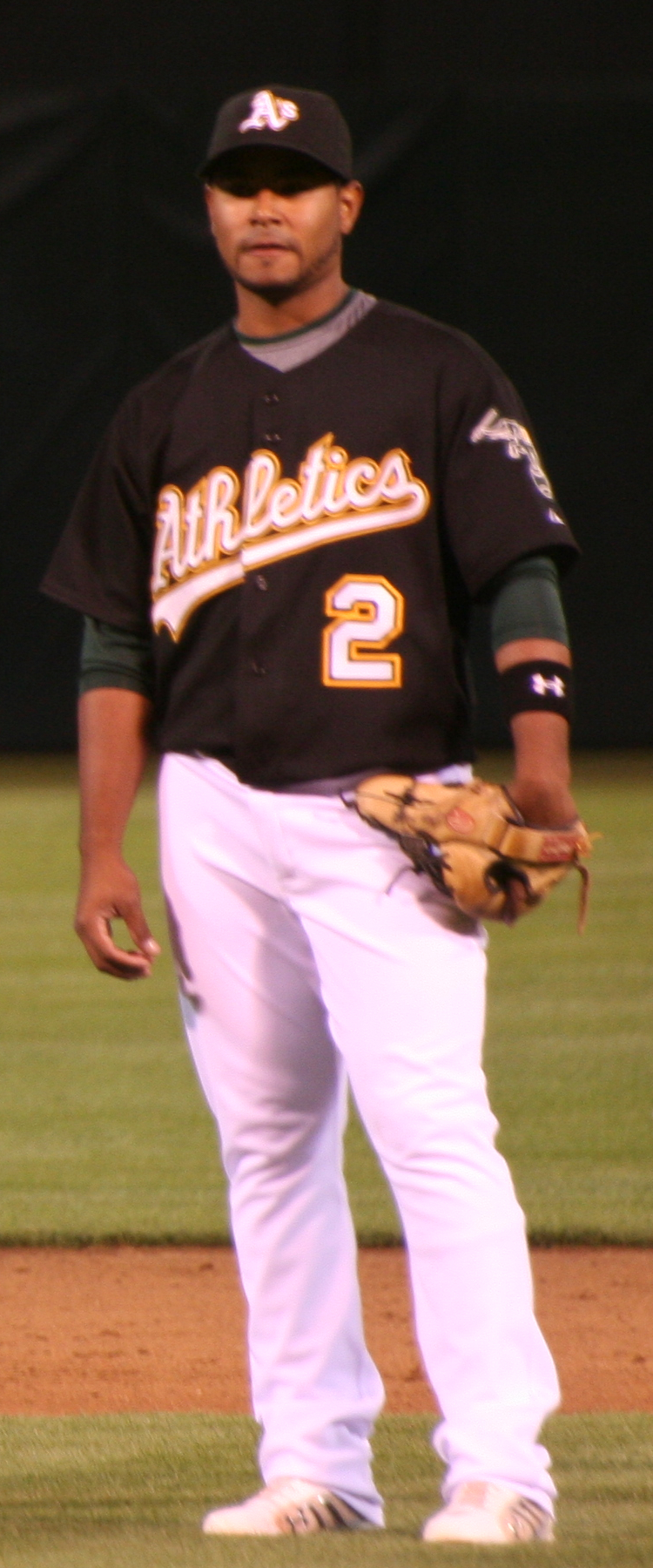
Petit with the Oakland Athletics

Petit made his major league debut on May 18, 2008, with the Oakland Athletics. He appeared in 14 games during the 2008 season, splitting time between second base and shortstop, and batted .348/.400/.435.

For the 2009 season, he played in 11 games, splitting his time between second base and third base. Petit was designated for assignment on February 1, 2010. He cleared waivers and was sent outright to the Triple-A Sacramento River Cats on February 11.

=== Texas Rangers ===
On March 24, 2010, Petit was traded to the Texas Rangers in exchange for Edwar Ramírez.

=== San Diego Padres ===
On December 3, 2010, Petit signed with the San Diego Padres. He was released on February 9, 2011.

=== Cleveland Indians ===
Petit signed a minor league contract with the Cleveland Indians on January 19, 2012. He spent all of 2012 with the Triple-A Columbus Clippers, hitting .260/.320/.403 with 10 HR and 45 RBI in 111 games, 82 at shortstop.

=== San Diego Padres (second stint) ===
Petit spent the 2013 season in the San Diego Padres organization. In 134 appearances for the Triple-A Tucson Padres, Petit batted .292/.344/.380 with four home runs and 61 RBI in 503 at-bats.

=== Houston Astros ===
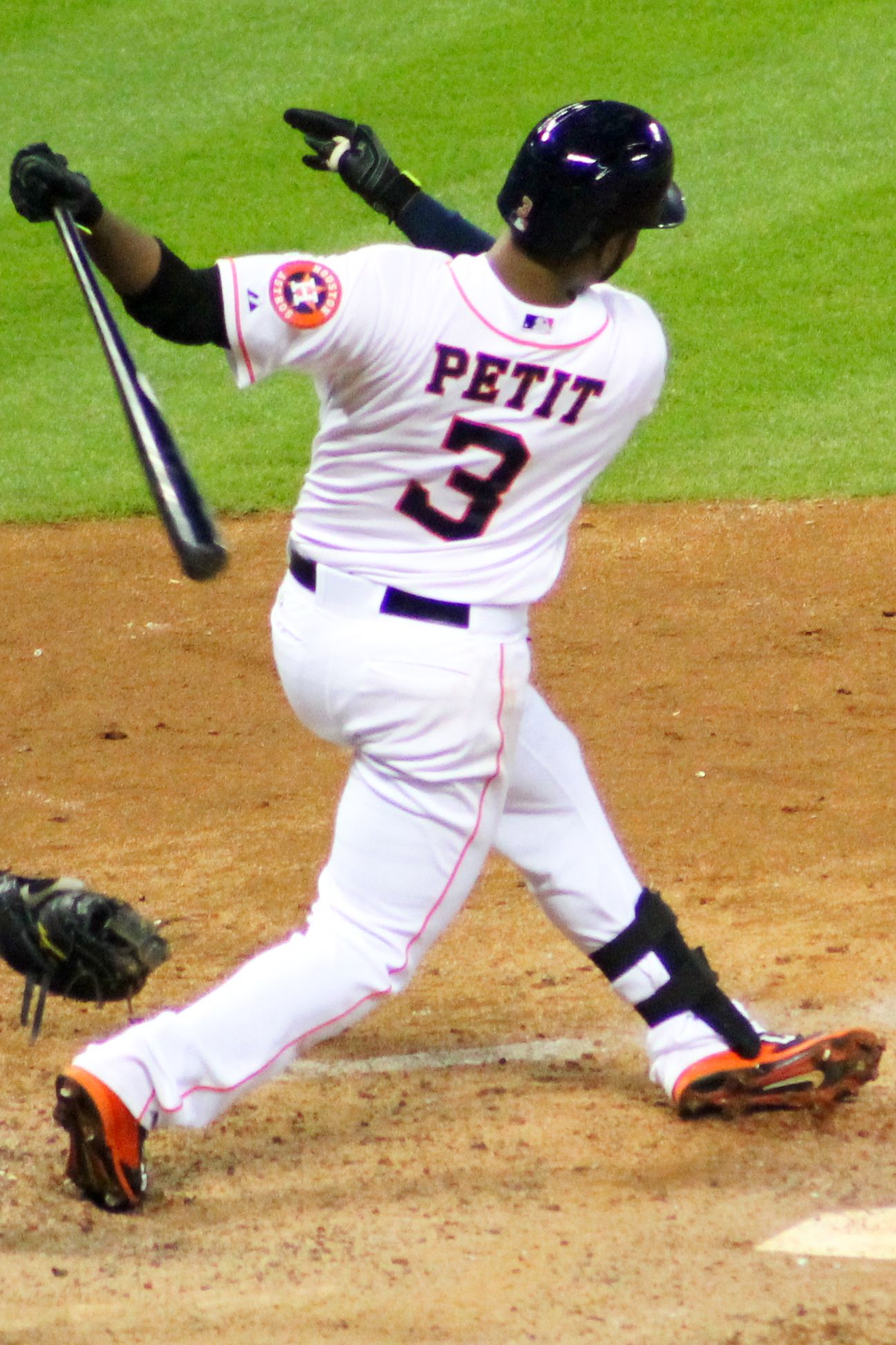
Petit with the Houston Astros

Petit signed a minor league contract with the Houston Astros on January 14, 2014. He played 37 MLB games for the Astros, hitting .278./.300/.423 with 2 home runs and 9 RBIs. Batting .297/.340/.457 in 317 at bats with the Oklahoma City RedHawks in Triple-A, he was a 2014 Pacific Coast League All Star. He was outrighted from the roster on December 22.

=== New York Yankees ===
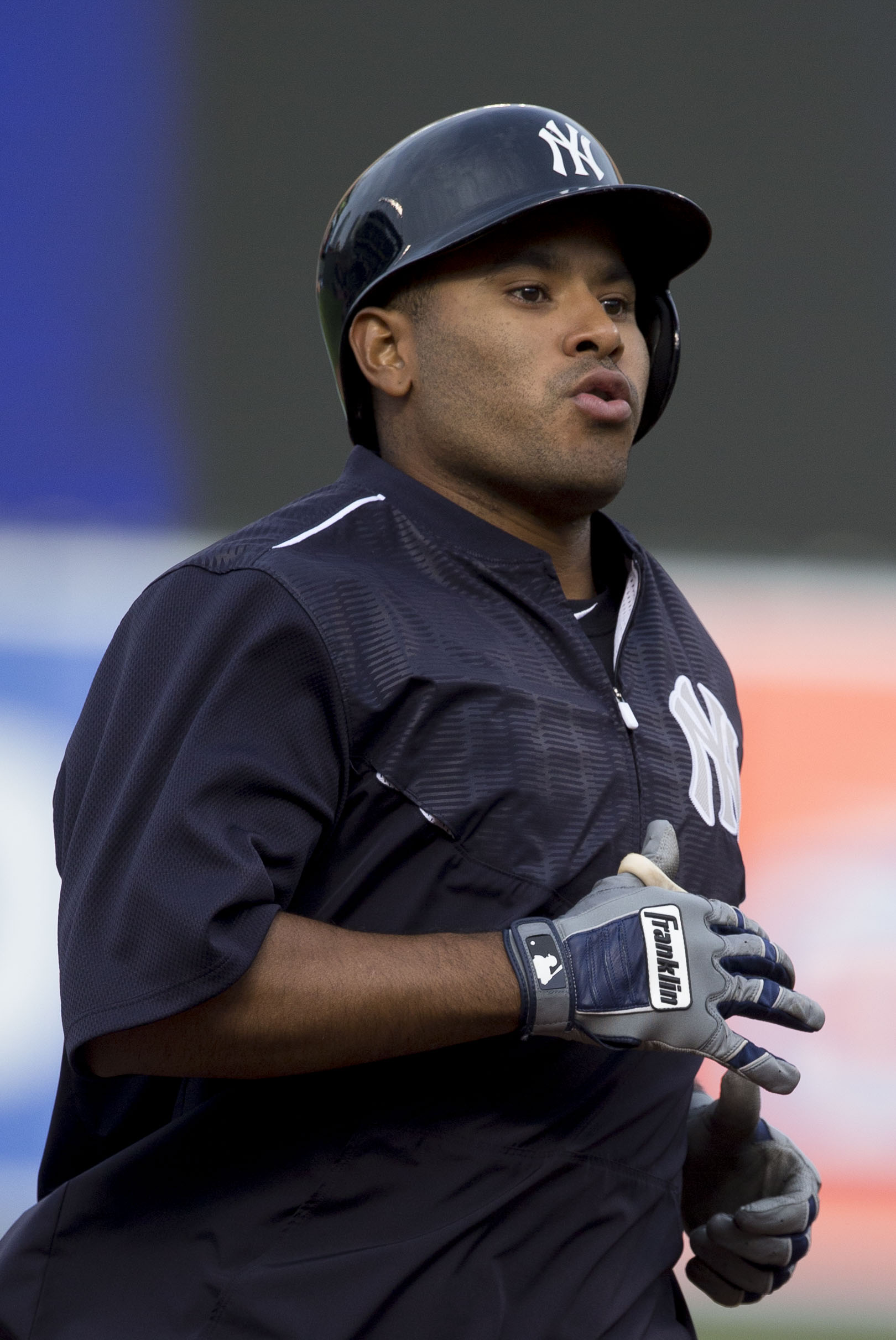
Petit with the New York Yankees

The Astros traded Petit to the New York Yankees in exchange for cash considerations or a player to be named later on April 1, 2015. He was optioned to Triple-A on April 28. Petit was recalled the next day on April 29, after Masahiro Tanaka went on the disabled list. On May 6, Petit was placed on the 15-day disabled list due to a bruised right hand. After coming off the DL, Gregorio was sent down to the Triple-A Scranton/Wilkes-Barre RailRiders on June 11. On July 25, he was designated for assignment, and he was sent outright to Scranton/Wilkes-Barre on July 27.

In October 2015, Petit was made a free agent by the Yankees.

=== Los Angeles Angels ===
On December 22, 2015, Petit signed a minor league contract with the Los Angeles Angels of Anaheim. On May 13, 2016, the Angels selected Petit's contract, adding him to their active roster. In 89 appearances for the Angels, he batted .245/.299/.348 with two home runs and 17 RBI across a career-high 204 at-bats. On November 28, 2016, Petit was designated for assignment by the Angels. He was non-tendered on December 2, and became a free agent.

=== Toronto Blue Jays ===
On January 23, 2017, Petit signed a minor league contract with the Toronto Blue Jays. He spent the majority of the 2017 season with the Triple-A Buffalo Bisons, for whom he batted .253/.275/.370 in 281 at bats, and elected free agency on November 7.

=== Minnesota Twins ===
On December 8, 2017, Petit signed a minor league contract with the Minnesota Twins. He was called up by the Twins on May 1, 2018.

In 2018 for the Twins, Petit batted .246/.313/.279 across 61 at-bats. With the Triple-A Rochester Red Wings, Petit batted .268/.313/.327 over 284 at-bats. Petit was designated for assignment by the Twins on June 12, 2018. He elected free agency on October 16.

Through 2018, in his major league career he had played 89 games at second base, 68 games at shortstop, 34 games at third base, six games in left field, and one game each in right field and at first base.

=== Philadelphia Phillies ===
On December 18, 2018, Petit signed a minor league contract with the Philadelphia Phillies. He was released prior to the start of the season on March 21, 2019.

== Coaching career ==
=== Houston Astros ===
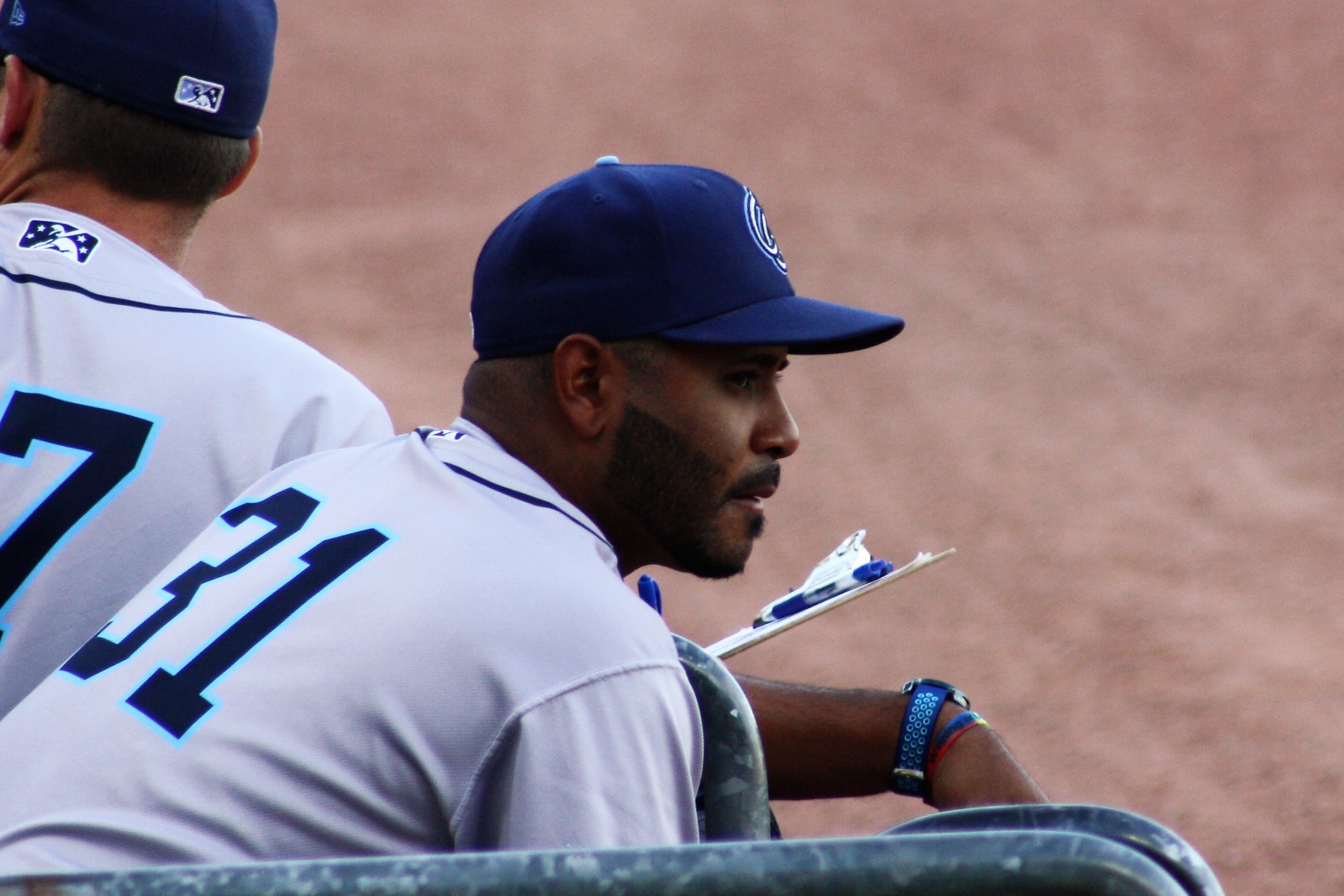
Petit managing the Hooks

Petit served as the manager of the Corpus Christi Hooks, the Double-A affiliate of the Houston Astros in 2022.

=== Oakland Athletics ===
In 2023, Petit served as the manager of the Stockton Ports, the Single-A affiliate of the Oakland Athletics.

Petit was named manager of the Double–A Midland Rockhounds for the 2024 season.

== See also ==
- List of Major League Baseball players from Venezuela

Sporting positions
Preceded by Omar López	Corpus Christi Hooks manager 2021–2022	Succeeded by Dickie Joe Thon
