= Ramón Flores (baseball) =

Venezuelan baseball player (born 1992)

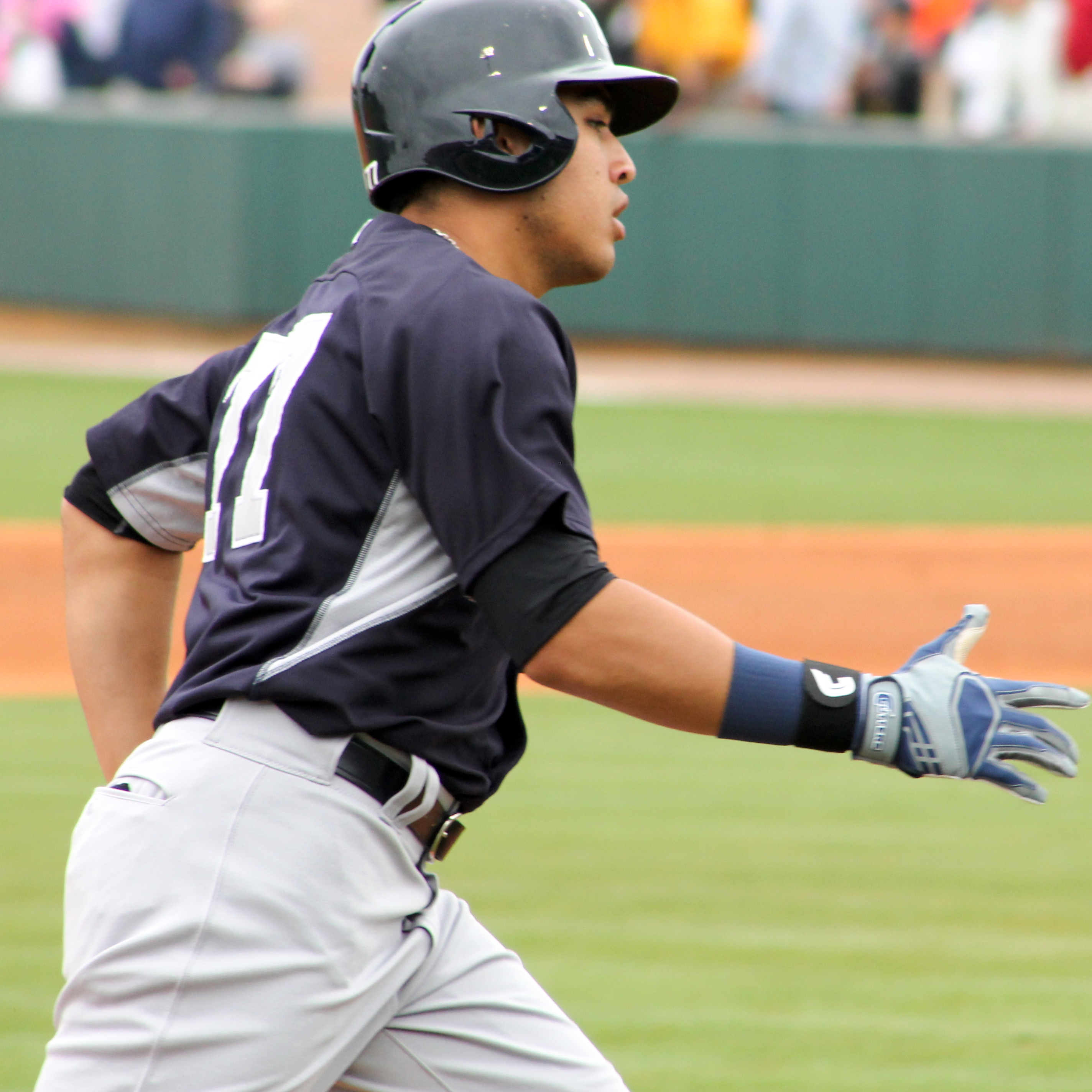
- Flores with the New York Yankees

Diablos Rojos del México – No. 23
- Outfielder
- Born: March 26, 1992 (age 34); Barinas, Barinas, Venezuela
- Bats: Left Throws: Left

MLB debut
- May 30, 2015, for the New York Yankees

MLB statistics (through 2017 season)
- Batting average: .204
- Home runs: 2
- Runs batted in: 20
- Stats at Baseball Reference

Teams
- New York Yankees (2015); Milwaukee Brewers (2016); Los Angeles Angels (2017)

Ramón Flores (born March 26, 1992) is a Venezuelan professional baseball outfielder for the Diablos Rojos del México of the Mexican League. He has previously played in Major League Baseball (MLB) for the New York Yankees, Milwaukee Brewers, and Los Angeles Angels.

== Professional career ==
=== New York Yankees ===
The New York Yankees signed Flores as an international free agent in 2008. Flores had a .302 batting average for the Tampa Yankees of the High–A Florida State League in 2012, and the Yankees added him to their 40-man roster after the 2012 season to protect him from the Rule 5 draft.

In the first game of the 2015 season, with the Scranton/Wilkes-Barre RailRiders of the Triple–A International League, Flores hit for the cycle.

The Yankees promoted Flores to the major leagues for the first time on May 29, 2015. On May 30, in his first major league game, he started in left field against the Oakland Athletics. The Yankees optioned Flores to Scranton/Wilkes-Barre on June 10 when Brendan Ryan was activated from the disabled list. On June 21, the Yankees recalled Flores to cover for the injured Mason Williams.

=== Seattle Mariners ===
On July 30, 2015, the Yankees traded Flores and José Ramírez to the Seattle Mariners for Dustin Ackley. The Mariners assigned him to the Tacoma Rainiers of the Triple–A Pacific Coast League (PCL). Flores batted .423 in 14 games for Tacoma, before he broke and dislocated his right ankle in August, and missed the remainder of the season.

=== Milwaukee Brewers ===
On November 20, 2015, the Mariners traded Flores to the Milwaukee Brewers in exchange for Luis Sardiñas. He made the Brewers' Opening Day roster after a strong spring training. On May 21, 2016, Flores hit his first career home run off Jacob deGrom at Citi Field. In 104 games for Milwaukee, he batted .205/.294/.261 with two home runs and 19 RBI. Flores was designated for assignment by the Brewers on August 19. He cleared waivers and was sent outright to the Triple–A Colorado Springs SkySox on August 24. Flores elected free agency following the season on November 7.

=== Los Angeles Angels ===
On November 15, 2016, Flores signed a minor league contract with the Los Angeles Angels organization. He played for the Triple-A Salt Lake Bees of the PCL, and the Angels promoted him to the major leagues on August 1, 2017. In three appearances for Los Angeles, Flores went 1-for-8 (.125) with one RBI. He was designated for assignment by the Angels on August 4. Flores was sent outright back to Salt Lake after clearing waivers on August 7. He elected free agency on October 2.

=== Boston Red Sox ===
On January 11, 2018, Flores signed a minor league contract with the Arizona Diamondbacks. On March 26, he was traded to the Boston Red Sox. In 56 appearances for the Triple-A Pawtucket Red Sox, Flores batted .215/.299/.308 with three home runs, 17 RBI, and two stolen bases. Flores was released by the Red Sox organization on July 4.

=== Somerset Patriots ===
On July 6, 2018, Flores signed with the Somerset Patriots of the Atlantic League of Professional Baseball. In 55 games, he hit .280/.337/.404 with four home runs, 31 RBI, and two stolen bases.

Flores made 83 appearances for Somerset during the 2019 season, and slashed .308/.392/.462 with six home runs, 47 RBI, and 10 stolen bases.

=== Minnesota Twins ===
On July 31, 2019, Flores had his contract purchased by the Minnesota Twins and was assigned to the Triple-A Rochester Red Wings. He finished the year batting .308/.435/.449 in 30 games with Rochester. Flores did not play in a game in 2020 due to the cancellation of the minor league season because of the COVID-19 pandemic. He became a free agent on November 2, 2020.

=== Washington Nationals ===
On February 16, 2021, Flores signed a minor league contract with the Washington Nationals organization that included an invitation to spring training. Flores struggled to a .136/.278/.136 slash line with no home runs and 2 RBI in 25 games between the Double-A Harrisburg Senators and the Triple-A Rochester Red Wings and was released by the Nationals organization on July 20.

=== Long Island Ducks ===
On July 23, 2021, Flores signed with the Long Island Ducks of the Atlantic League of Professional Baseball. In 64 games, Flores batted .243/.365/.391 with seven home runs and 36 RBI. He became a free agent after the season.

=== Diablos Rojos del México ===
On January 9, 2022, Flores signed with the Diablos Rojos del México of the Mexican League. In 78 appearances for the Diablos, he hit .382/.455/.583 with 10 home runs and 67 RBI.

In 2023, Flores played in 84 games for México his second season with the team, hitting .319/.427/.448 with three home runs and 45 RBI.

In 57 games for México in 2024 his third season with the team, Flores hit .323/.424/.453 with one home run, 13 RBI, and two stolen bases. With the team, he won the Serie del Rey.

Flores made 53 appearances for México, during the 2025 campaign, hitting .275/.39/.413 with four home runs, 30 RBI, and one stolen base. With the team, he won his second consecutive Serie del Rey.

== See also ==
- List of Major League Baseball players from Venezuela
