= Jacob Lindgren =

American baseball player (born 1993)

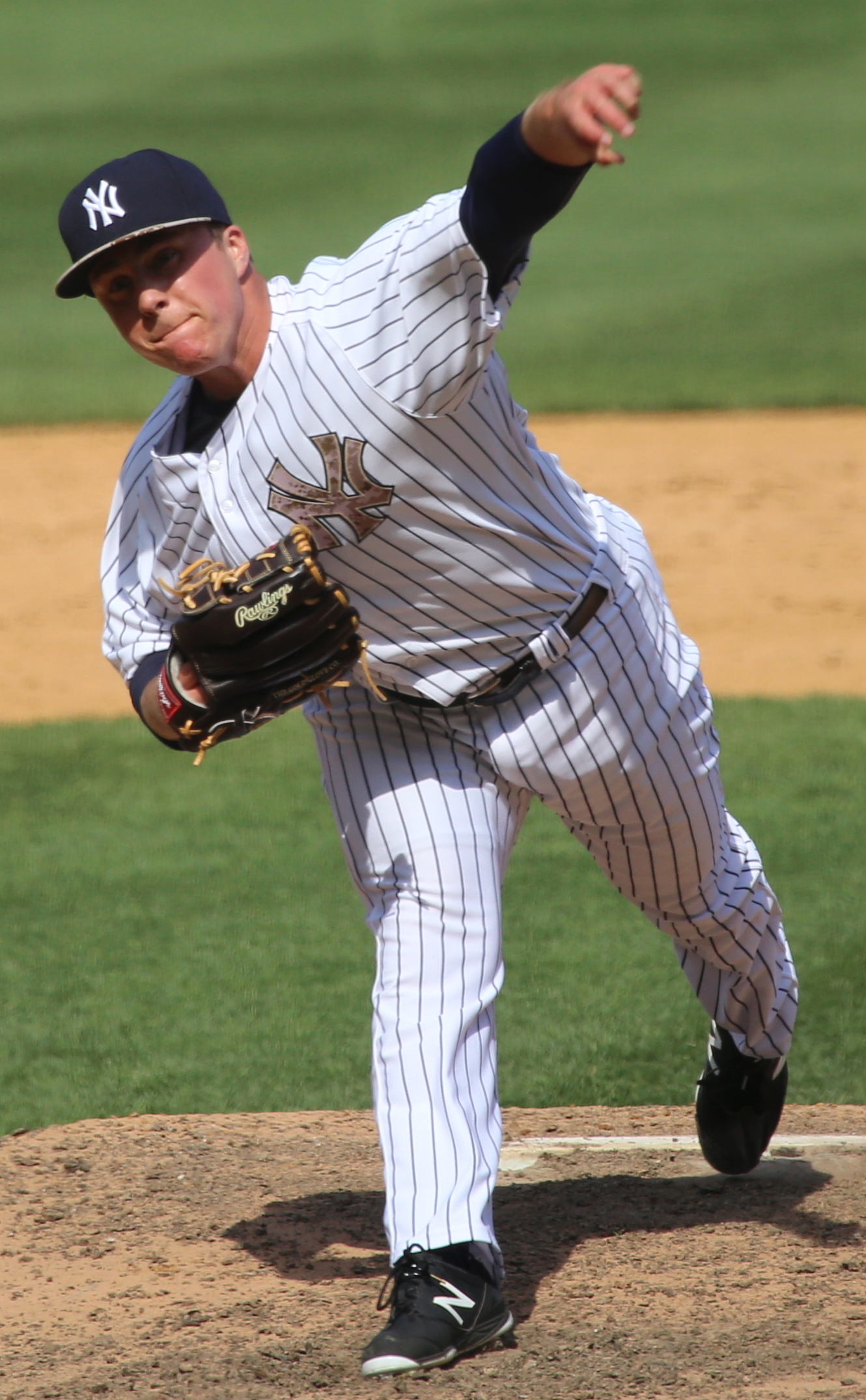
- Lindgren with the New York Yankees
- Pitcher
- Born: March 12, 1993 (age 33); Bay St. Louis, Mississippi, U.S.
- Batted: Left Threw: Left

MLB debut
- May 25, 2015, for the New York Yankees

Last MLB appearance
- June 12, 2015, for the New York Yankees

MLB statistics
- Win–loss record: 0–0
- Earned run average: 5.14
- Strikeouts: 8
- Stats at Baseball Reference

Teams
- New York Yankees (2015)

Jacob Stephen Lindgren (born March 12, 1993) is an American former professional baseball pitcher. He played in Major League Baseball (MLB) for the New York Yankees in 2015. He played college baseball for Mississippi State University.

== Amateur career ==
Lindgren attended Saint Stanislaus College in Bay St. Louis, Mississippi. The Chicago Cubs of Major League Baseball (MLB) selected Lindgren in the 12th round of the 2011 MLB draft, but he opted not to sign with the Cubs. Lindgren enrolled at Mississippi State University, where he played college baseball for the Mississippi State Bulldogs baseball team. As a sophomore, Lindgren pitched for the Bulldogs in the 2013 College World Series, which Mississippi State lost to the UCLA Bruins. In 2013, he played collegiate summer baseball in the Cape Cod Baseball League for the Bourne Braves.

Lindgren became a relief pitcher in 2014, his junior year. In 2014, he was named a finalist for the C Spire Ferriss Trophy, given to the best college baseball player in Mississippi. He finished his college career with a 12–6 win–loss record, 2.64 earned run average (ERA) (including 0.81 in his Junior 2014 season, his first as a reliever), 189 strikeouts, and 50 walks in 54 games (16 starts) and 139 2/3 innings pitched.

== Professional career ==
=== New York Yankees ===
The New York Yankees selected Lindgren in the second round, with the 55th overall selection, of the 2014 MLB draft. His Bulldogs teammate Jonathan Holder was also drafted by the Yankees in the sixth round. On June 14, 2014, Lindgren signed with the Yankees for a $1.1 million signing bonus. He played in five games for the Gulf Coast League Yankees and Charleston RiverDogs of the Single-A South Atlantic League before being promoted to the Tampa Yankees of the High-A Florida State League in July. Lindgren was promoted to the Trenton Thunder of the Double-A Eastern League in August. Over the whole season, he pitched in 19 games with a 2–1 record, 2.16 ERA, a save, and 48 strikeouts compared to just 13 walks in 24 2/3 innings pitched. His high rate of strikeouts earned him the nickname 'The Strikeout Factory.'

Lindgren began the 2015 season with the Scranton/Wilkes-Barre RailRiders of the Triple-A International League. He pitched to a 1–1 record with a 1.23 ERA and 29 strikeouts in 22 innings, before the Yankees promoted him to the major leagues on May 24. He made his major league debut on May 25 against the Kansas City Royals, striking out two and walking two in two innings of work. He was sent down to Scranton/Wilkes-Barre on June 13 after allowing four runs on five hits (three home runs) and four walks in just seven innings. On June 21, the Yankees announced that Lindgren would have surgery to remove a bone spur from his left elbow.

Lindgren struggled during spring training in 2016, and began the season with the High-A Tampa Yankees. He spent most of the season on the disabled list due to elbow injuries. He underwent Tommy John surgery in August, which forced him out for the rest of the season. On December 2, 2016 the Yankees non-tendered Lindgren, making him a free agent.

=== Atlanta Braves ===
On December 4, 2016, Lindgren signed one-year contract with the Atlanta Braves, worth roughly $1 million. He missed the entire 2017 season while recovering from Tommy John surgery. Lindgren experienced soreness in his elbow early into spring training. He underwent Tommy John surgery for the second time in his career on March 29, 2018, and missed a second full season. He elected free agency on November 2.

=== Chicago White Sox ===
On January 5, 2019, Lindgren signed a minor league deal with the Chicago White Sox. He split the year between the rookie ball AZL White Sox, the Single-A Kannapolis Intimidators, and the High-A Winston-Salem Dash, posting a 2.83 ERA with 28 strikeouts in 28.2 innings of work.

Though he initially re-signed with the Braves before the 2020 season, Lindgren did not play in a game that year due to the cancellation of the minor league season because of the COVID-19 pandemic. He re-signed on a minor league deal on November 2, 2020, and was a non-roster invitee that spring. Lindgren recorded a 10.13 ERA across 8 appearances for the Triple-A Charlotte Knights before being released on June 4, 2021.

=== Kansas City Monarchs ===
On June 20, 2021, Lindgren signed with the Kansas City Monarchs of the American Association of Professional Baseball. Lindgren made 23 appearances for the Monarchs downs the stretch, posting an 0-2 record and 5.40 ERA with 25 strikeouts in 26 2/3 innings pitched.

He was released on March 24, 2022. On April 28, Lindgren re-signed with the Monarchs. Lindgren pitched in 21 games for the team, working to a 1-0 record and 4.26 ERA with 33 strikeouts in 25 1/3 innings of work. He was released again on August 20.

On February 20, 2023, Lindgren announced his retirement from professional baseball.
