= Chasen Shreve =

American baseball player (born 1990)

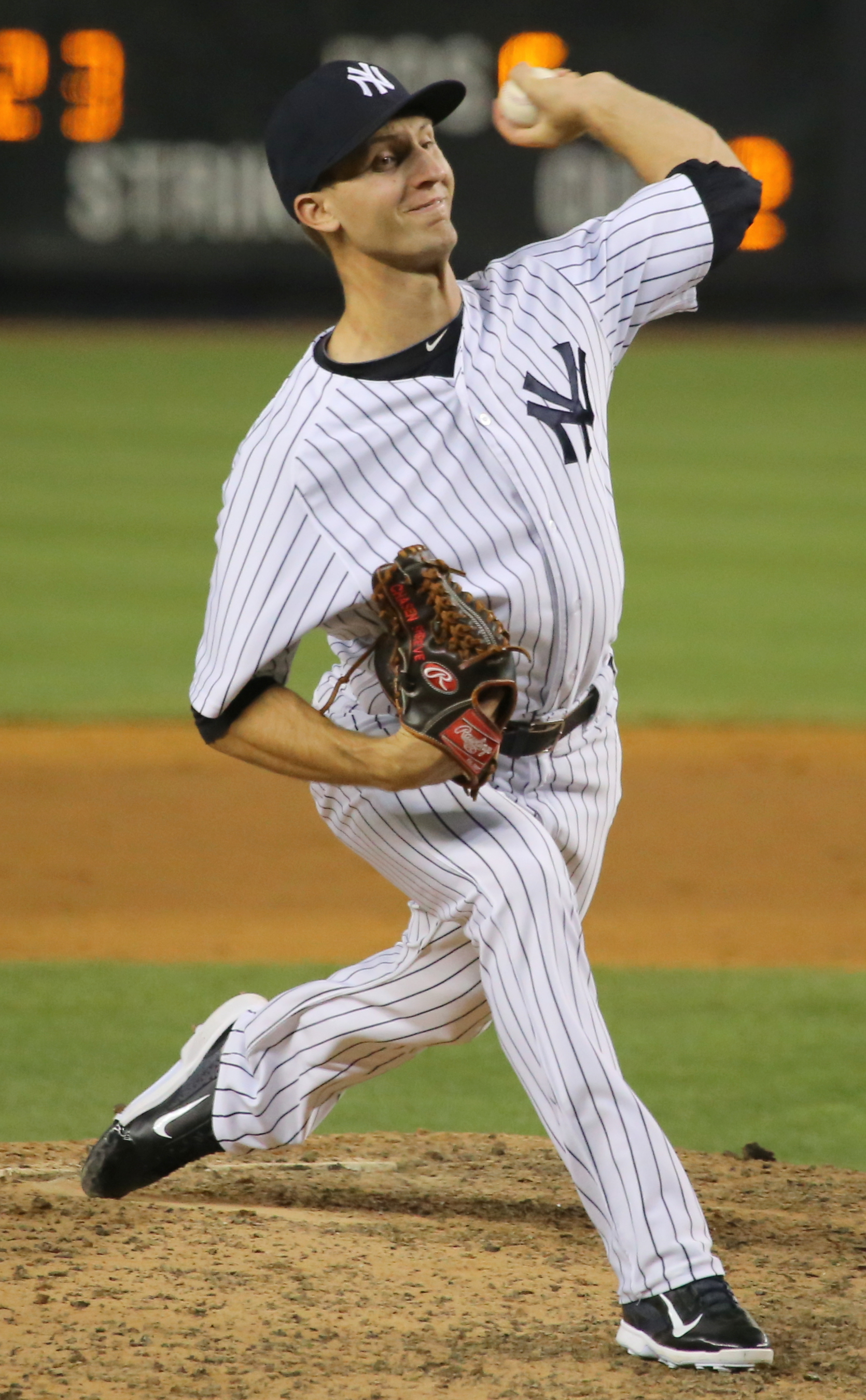
- Shreve with the Yankees in 2015

Free agent
- Pitcher
- Born: July 12, 1990 (age 36); Las Vegas, Nevada, U.S.
- Bats: Left Throws: Left

MLB debut
- July 19, 2014, for the Atlanta Braves

MLB statistics (through 2024 season)
- Win–loss record: 22–14
- Earned run average: 3.96
- Strikeouts: 387
- Stats at Baseball Reference

Teams
- Atlanta Braves (2014); New York Yankees (2015–2018); St. Louis Cardinals (2018–2019); New York Mets (2020); Pittsburgh Pirates (2021); New York Mets (2022); Detroit Tigers (2023); Cincinnati Reds (2023); Colorado Rockies (2024)

Chasen Dean Shreve (born July 12, 1990) is an American professional baseball pitcher who is a free agent. He has previously played in Major League Baseball (MLB) for the Atlanta Braves, New York Yankees, St. Louis Cardinals, Pittsburgh Pirates, New York Mets, Detroit Tigers, Cincinnati Reds, and Colorado Rockies.

== Career ==
=== Amateur career ===
Shreve attended Bonanza High School in Las Vegas, Nevada. In his senior year, Shreve was named to the Nevada All-State Second team for baseball. He enrolled at the College of Southern Nevada, where he played college baseball.

=== Atlanta Braves ===
The Atlanta Braves selected Shreve in the 11th round of the 2010 Major League Baseball draft. He made his professional debut with the Danville Braves of the Rookie-level Appalachian League that year, pitching to a 2–0 win–loss record and a 2.25 earned run average (ERA). In 2011, Shreve pitched for the Rome Braves of the Single–A South Atlantic League, finishing the season with a 5–6 win–loss record and a 3.86 ERA.

Shreve began the 2012 season with the Lynchburg Hillcats of the High–A Carolina League, where he had a 4–4 win–loss record and a 2.15 ERA, before receiving a promotion to the Mississippi Braves of the Double–A Southern League, where he had a 2–1 record and a 3.93 ERA. Shreve split the 2013 season with Mississippi and Lynchburg, pitching to a 3–1 record and a 4.43 ERA in Mississippi and a 0–1 record and a 2.75 ERA with Lynchburg.

During spring training in 2014, Shreve altered his approach to increase his pitching velocity. He had a 3–2 with seven saves and a 2.48 ERA. The Braves promoted Shreve to the major leagues for the first time on July 19, 2014, to replace Luis Avilán. The Braves demoted Shreve to the Gwinnett Braves of the Triple–A International League on August 1. He made 15 appearances for the Braves in 2014 accumulating a 0.73 ERA.

=== New York Yankees ===
The Braves traded Shreve and David Carpenter to the New York Yankees for Manny Banuelos on January 1, 2015.

Shreve pitched to a 1.89 ERA in his first 52 1/3 innings of the 2015 season, but had a 13.50 ERA in his final six innings, during which he allowed four home runs. Yankees catcher Brian McCann speculated that Shreve was tipping his pitches to opposing hitters, though Larry Rothschild, the Yankees pitching coach, believed Shreve was simply tired at the end of the season. Overall in 2015, Shreve ended the season 6–2 with a 3.09 ERA in 59 game appearances.

Shreve struggled to a 5.21 ERA in his first 19 appearances to begin 2016. On May 26, 2016, he was placed on the 15-day disabled list due to a left shoulder strain. On August 30, Shreve earned his first Major League save in 5–4 ten-inning win over the Kansas City Royals. In 2017, Shreve spent the first half of the season between the Triple–A Scranton/Wilkes-Barre RailRiders and the Yankees bullpen. Through his first 29 appearances, he collected a 2.77 ERA before being sent back down to Scranton on July 19 after the acquisition of David Robertson and Tommy Kahnle. The Yankees recalled Shreve on July 30.

=== St. Louis Cardinals ===
On July 27, 2018, the Yankees traded Shreve and Giovanny Gallegos to the St. Louis Cardinals for Luke Voit and bonus pool money. In 39 games for the Yankees, he had compiled a 2–2 record with a 4.26 ERA.

Shreve finished his 2018 campaign in St. Louis with a 1–2 record and a 3.07 ERA in 20 relief appearances. On March 22, 2019, Shreve was designated for assignment by the team. He was outrighted on March 27 and assigned to the Memphis Redbirds of the Triple–A Pacific Coast League. He was recalled to St. Louis for the first time in 2019 on July 11, but designated for assignment once again on July 23. Shreve elected free agency on October 1, 2019.

=== New York Mets ===
On November 21, 2019, Shreve signed a minor league contract with the New York Mets. During the shortened 2020 season, Shreve appeared in 17 games for the Mets and recorded a 3.96 ERA and 34 strikeouts in 25 innings. On December 2, 2020, Shreve was non tendered by the Mets.

=== Pittsburgh Pirates ===
On February 7, 2021, Shreve signed a minor league contract with the Pittsburgh Pirates organization. On May 11, 2021, Shreve was selected to the active roster. Shreve pitched to a 3.20 ERA in 57 appearances out of the bullpen for Pittsburgh. On November 6, Shreve was outrighted off of the 40-man roster and elected free agency.

=== New York Mets (second stint) ===
On November 17, 2021, Shreve signed a minor league deal with the New York Mets. On April 4, 2022, Shreve had his contract selected to the big league roster. On July 5, the Mets designated Shreve for assignment. On July 8, Shreve was released by the Mets.

=== New York Yankees (second stint) ===
On August 28, 2022, Shreve signed a minor league deal with the New York Yankees. In 5 appearances for the Triple–A Scranton/Wilkes-Barre RailRiders, he posted a 1.93 ERA with 5 strikeouts in 4 2/3 innings of work. Shreve elected free agency following the season on November 10.

=== Detroit Tigers ===
On January 9, 2023, Shreve signed a minor league contract with the Detroit Tigers organization. On March 29, the Tigers announced that Shreve had made the Opening Day roster. In 47 games for Detroit, he posted a 4.79 ERA with 42 strikeouts in 41 1/3 innings pitched. On August 11, Shreve was designated for assignment. He cleared waivers and was released by the Tigers the same day.

=== Cincinnati Reds ===
On August 17, 2023, Shreve signed a minor league contract with the Cincinnati Reds organization. In 6 appearances for the Triple–A Louisville Bats, he registered a 2.25 ERA with 5 strikeouts in 4.0 innings of work. On September 2, the Reds selected Shreve's contract to the major league roster after Graham Ashcraft was placed on the injured list. In 3 games for Cincinnati, he allowed one run on one hit and two walks with three strikeouts in 3 1/3 innings of work. On September 12, Shreve was designated for assignment after Brandon Williamson was activated from the injured list. He was released by the Reds on September 16.

=== Texas Rangers ===
On February 5, 2024, Shreve signed a minor league contract with the Texas Rangers. In 10 appearances for the Triple–A Round Rock Express, he recorded a 2.61 ERA with 9 strikeouts across 10 1/3 innings. On May 2, Shreve exercised the opt–out clause in his contract and became a free agent. On May 10, Shreve re–signed with the Rangers on a new minor league contract. He was released again on June 15.

=== New York Yankees (third stint) ===
On June 22, 2024, Shreve signed a minor league contract with the New York Yankees. In 10 appearances for the Triple–A Scranton/Wilkes-Barre RailRiders, he compiled a 2.45 ERA with 11 strikeouts across 11 innings pitched. Shreve was released by the Yankees organization on August 1.

=== Colorado Rockies ===
On August 4, 2024, Shreve signed a minor league contract with the Colorado Rockies. On August 6, after one appearance for the Triple–A Albuquerque Isotopes, the Rockies selected Shreve's contract and added him to their active roster. He made one scoreless appearance before he was designated for assignment on August 10. Shreve elected free agency on August 14.

=== Atlanta Braves (second stint) ===
On January 20, 2025, Shreve signed a minor league contract with the Atlanta Braves. In 5 appearances (4 starts) for the Triple-A Gwinnett Stripers, he posted a 1-2 record and 5.60 ERA with 12 strikeouts across 17 2/3 innings pitched. Shreve was released by the Braves organization on April 24.
