= 2015 Cleveland Indians season =

2015 Cleveland Indians
- League: American League
- Division: Central
- Ballpark: Progressive Field
- City: Cleveland, Ohio
- Record: 81–80 (.503)
- Divisional place: 3rd
- Owners: Larry Dolan
- General managers: Chris Antonetti
- Managers: Terry Francona
- Television: SportsTime Ohio · WKYC (Matt Underwood, Rick Manning, Andre Knott)
- Radio: WTAM · WMMS; Cleveland Indians Radio Network (Tom Hamilton, Jim Rosenhaus)

The 2015 Cleveland Indians season was the 115th season for the franchise. The team played its 22nd season at Progressive Field. The team looked to improve upon their 85–77 record and third-place divisional finish from the previous season; however, the Indians finished in third place in the American League Central with an 81–80 record and missed the playoffs for the second consecutive season and the seventh time in the last eight seasons.

== Offseason ==
- October 30: Jason Giambi becomes a free agent. He later retires.
- November 3: The Chicago White Sox claimed J. B. Shuck off waivers, and the Indians sent Chris Gimenez to the minors and invited Tyler Cloyd to spring training.
- November 6-November 18: Signed 5 players to a minor league contract and invited 3, including Shaun Marcum to spring training.
- November 20: Promoted 5 players from the minors.
- November 23: Received Charles Brewer from the Arizona Diamondbacks for cash and sent Scott Barnes to the minors.
- Barnes would be later traded to the Baltimore Orioles for cash on November 26.
- December 2: Signed Destin Hood to a minor league contract and invited him to spring training.
- December 7: Signed Adam Moore to a minor league contract and invited him to spring training.
- December 8: Received Brandon Moss from the Oakland Athletics for Joe Wendle.
- December 12-December 15: Signed 5 players to a minor league contract and invited 3 of them to spring training.
- December 16: Signed Gavin Floyd and sent Nick Maronde to the minors.
- December 18-December 20: Signed 3 players to a minor league contract and invited 2 of them to spring training.
- January 6-January 26: Released Tyler Cloyd and signed 5 players to a minor league contract, inviting 3 to spring training.
- January 27: Invited 7 non-roster players to spring training.

== Regular season ==
=== Season summary ===
==== Opening Day starting lineup ====
1. CF Michael Bourn
2. 2B Jason Kipnis
3. LF Michael Brantley
4. 1B Carlos Santana
5. C Yan Gomes
6. RF Brandon Moss
7. DH Ryan Raburn
8. 3B Lonnie Chisenhall
9. SS José Ramírez

SP Corey Kluber

==== April ====
The Indians opened the season on April 6 against the Houston Astros at Minute Maid Park. Despite a strong pitching performance by reigning Cy Young Award winner Corey Kluber, the Indians failed to score against Dallas Keuchel and the Asros' pitching staff en route to a 2–0 loss. The Indians would bounce back and win the next two games over the Astros as Carlos Carrasco and Trevor Bauer would combine to pitch 14 1/3 shutout innings. Indians pitchers recorded 36 strikeouts over the first three games. On April 9, the Indians came within 2 outs of their first no-hitter since Len Barker's perfect game in 1981. Bauer and relievers, Kyle Crockett, Scott Atchison, and Nick Hagadone combined to hold the Houston Astros hitless through the first 8 1/3 innings. Jed Lowrie broke up the no-hit bid with a home run. Bauer is the first pitcher since 1914 to have at least 11 strikeouts and allow no hits in 6 innings or less.

The Indians' first game at the newly renovated Progressive Field was on April 10, an 8–4 loss to the rival Detroit Tigers. The Indians would struggle to a 7–14 record in April putting them at the bottom of the AL Central. The vast majority of their games were played against division rivals. Reigning Cy Young Award winner Corey Kluber failed to record a win in five starts in April, posting a record of 0–3.

==== May ====
The Indians' early struggles continued into the first two weeks of May. On May 14, the team was 12–21, which was the worst record in the American League. The Indians had gone over a month without winning consecutive games, the last time they had done so was the second and third games of the season. The Indians broke that streak by winning two games over the Texas Rangers on May 15 and 16, before winning six straight games from May 19–24. This streak included a sweep over their interleague rivals, the Cincinnati Reds. The Indians won 12 of their last 17 games in May, to climb to within two games of .500.

On May 13, Corey Kluber struck out 18 St. Louis Cardinals batters in 8 innings pitched. He became the first pitcher since Randy Johnson in 2004 to strike out that many in one game, the first American League pitcher with at least 18 strikeouts in a game since Roger Clemens did in 1998, and also tied the franchise record for strikeouts in a game set by Bob Feller in 1938.

Offensively, the Indians were led by second baseman Jason Kipnis, who was named the American League Player of the Month. During May, Kipnis hit .429 with 51 hits and 15 doubles, both of which are the most by any MLB player in a month since 2009. He also had an on-base percentage of .511.

==== June ====
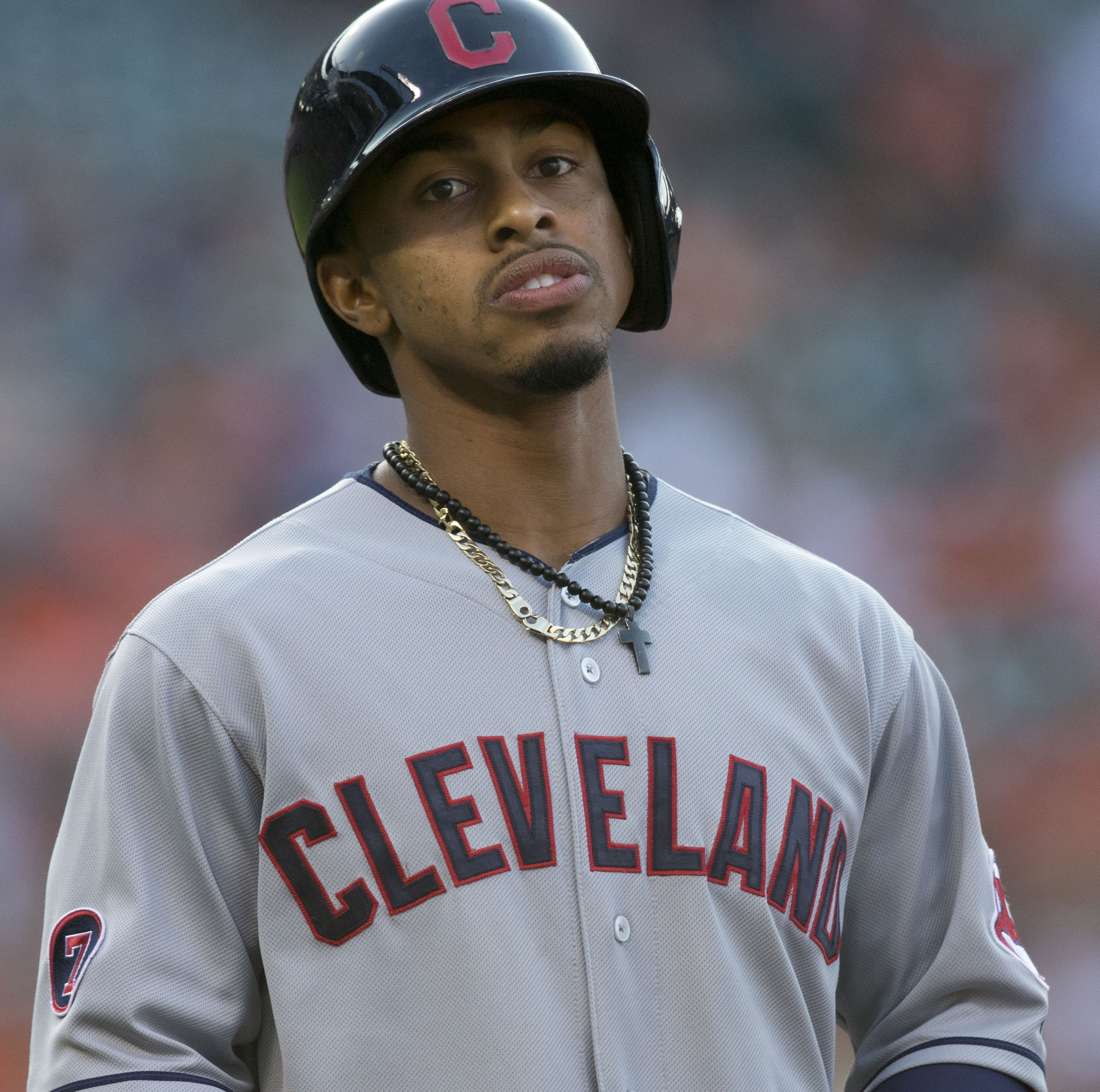
Prospect Francisco Lindor in June 2015

The Indians struggled to an 11–15 record during the month of June. The team won 3 of its first 5 games of the month to climb to within a game of .500, but would then lose 13 of its next 19 games to fall to 33–41 and last place in the AL Central. Kluber failed to record a win for the second month this season, and his record fell to 3–9 by month's end. The Indians' struggles were shown most clearly during a double header in Baltimore on June 28. The Tribe lost both games, 4–0 and 8–0, marking the first time since 1975 that the Indians were shut out in both games of a doubleheader.

June also saw the Indians send opening day infielders Lonnie Chisenhall and José Ramírez to AAA Columbus and brought up infielders Giovanny Urshela and former first-round pick Francisco Lindor.

One bright spot for the Indians was the emergence of SP Cody Anderson. In two starts in June, Anderson went 15 2/3 innings, giving up only one earned run. Anderson's second start on June 29 was the first of three consecutive starts in which an Indians' pitcher took a perfect game into at least the 6th inning.

==== July ====
The Indians began July right where they ended June, with a dominant pitching performance. On July 1, SP Carlos Carrasco would come within one out of a no-hitter in an 8–1 win over the Tampa Bay Rays, marking the third consecutive start in which an Indians' pitcher took a perfect game into at least the 6th inning.

On July 5, 2B Jason Kipnis was named as the Indians' lone representative in the All-Star Game as a reserve. He had one at-bat, in which he struck out.

The Indians' inconsistent play continued throughout July, as they would have several winning and losing streaks of at least three games. Shortly after the All-Star Break, the Indians had a major set-back as they would get swept in four games by the Chicago White Sox at home, part of a 1–6 home stand. This moved the Indians back into last place in the division, and seemingly out of the playoff race.

The Indians would make several trades before the July 31 non-waiver trade deadline. They sent OF David Murphy to the Los Angeles Angels of Anaheim for AA infielder Eric Stamets. They traded 1B/OF Brandon Moss to the St. Louis Cardinals for pitching prospect and 2013 first-round draft pick Rob Kaminsky. Lastly, they traded RP Marc Rzepczynski to the San Diego Padres for AAA OF Abraham Almonte.

Despite these struggles, the Indians would go on to win the final three games of the month to finish July at 13–13.

==== August ====
The Indians struggles continued, as they would lose five of their first six games of the month, falling ten games below .500 on August 7. On that day, they traded CF Michael Bourn and 1B/OF Nick Swisher and $10 million in cash considerations to the Atlanta Braves for 1B Chris Johnson. The team would bring up OF Abraham Almonte from AAA Columbus after the trade.

The Tribe began a turnaround on August 8, as they would win their next four games, and close out the month winning 15 of 23, including 9 of 10 home games. During this stretch, the Indians recorded 10 base hits in 10 consecutive games, something the Indians had not accomplished since 1936. At the end of the month, the Indians had climbed to within two games of .500 at 64–66, and four games behind the Texas Rangers for the second wild card spot.

==== September–October ====
The Indians played the majority of the season's final month against their Central Division rivals. The Indians lost 3 of their first 4 games of the month while Kluber suffered a hamstring injury, causing him to miss 12 days. The Indians then won five of their next six games between September 6 and 13, improving their record to 70–70 and marking the first time the Indians were .500 since they were 2–2. The Indians would also be 71–71, 72–72, 73–73, and 74–74, but lost the following game each time. They briefly made it over the .500 mark at 77–76 on September 26, but went on to lose three in a row.

The Indians spent much of September 3–5 games behind the Texas Rangers or Houston Astros for the second wild card spot in the American League. They remained mathematically in the playoff race until the final week of the season, when they lost three out of four to the Minnesota Twins, another one of the teams in the hunt for the last playoff spot. The Indians were officially eliminated from the wild card race during this series on September 30. The Tribe however went on to sweep the Boston Red Sox in their final series of the season, to finish the season at 81–80. This marked the third straight season that the Indians finished above .500, which had not happened since 1999 through 2001.

=== Season standings ===
==== American League Central ====
AL Central
Team	W	L	Pct.	GB	Home	Road
Kansas City Royals	95	67	.586	—	51‍–‍30	44‍–‍37
Minnesota Twins	83	79	.512	12	46‍–‍35	37‍–‍44
Cleveland Indians	81	80	.503	13½	39‍–‍41	42‍–‍39
Chicago White Sox	76	86	.469	19	40‍–‍41	36‍–‍45
Detroit Tigers	74	87	.460	20½	38‍–‍43	36‍–‍44

==== American League Wild Card ====
Division leaders
Team	W	L	Pct.
Kansas City Royals	95	67	.586
Toronto Blue Jays	93	69	.574
Texas Rangers	88	74	.543

Wild Card teams (Top 2 teams qualify for postseason)
Team	W	L	Pct.	GB
New York Yankees	87	75	.537	+1
Houston Astros	86	76	.531	—
Los Angeles Angels of Anaheim	85	77	.525	1
Minnesota Twins	83	79	.512	3
Cleveland Indians	81	80	.503	4½
Baltimore Orioles	81	81	.500	5
Tampa Bay Rays	80	82	.494	6
Boston Red Sox	78	84	.481	8
Chicago White Sox	76	86	.469	10
Seattle Mariners	76	86	.469	10
Detroit Tigers	74	87	.460	11½
Oakland Athletics	68	94	.420	18

==== Record against opponents ====
2015 American League record Source: MLB Standings Grid – 2015
Team	BAL	BOS	CWS	CLE	DET	HOU	KC	LAA	MIN	NYY	OAK	SEA	TB	TEX	TOR	NL
Baltimore	—	11–8	3–3	5–1	4–3	3–4	3–4	2–4	0–7	10–9	6–1	3–3	10–9	1–6	8–11	12–8
Boston	8–11	—	3–4	2–4	4–2	2–4	4–3	2–5	2–5	8–11	5–1	4–3	9–10	2–5	10–9	13–7
Chicago	3–3	4–3	—	10–9	9–10	5–1	7–12	4–3	6–13	2–5	5–2	4–3	1–5	3–3	4–3	9–11
Cleveland	1–5	4–2	9–10	—	7–11	5–2	9–10	4–2	7–12	5–2	3–4	4–3	5–2	3–3	3–4	12–8
Detroit	3–4	2–4	10–9	11–7	—	3–4	9–10	1–6	11–8	2–5	2–4	4–3	3–3	2–5	2–4	9–11
Houston	4–3	4–2	1–5	2–5	4–3	—	4–2	10–9	3–3	4–3	10–9	12–7	2–5	6–13	4–3	16–4
Kansas City	4–3	3–4	12–7	10–9	10–9	2–4	—	6–1	12–7	2–4	5–1	4–2	6–1	3–4	3–4	13–7
Los Angeles	4–2	5–2	3–4	2–4	6–1	9–10	1–6	—	5–2	2–4	11–8	12–7	3–3	12–7	2–5	8–12
Minnesota	7–0	5–2	13–6	12–7	8–11	3–3	7–12	2–5	—	1–5	4–3	4–3	4–2	3–3	2–5	8–12
New York	9–10	11–8	5–2	2–5	5–2	3–4	4–2	4–2	5–1	—	3–4	5–1	12–7	2–5	6–13	11–9
Oakland	1–6	1–5	2–5	4–3	4–2	9–10	1–5	8–11	3–4	4–3	—	6–13	3–4	10–9	1–5	11–9
Seattle	3–3	3–4	3–4	3–4	3–4	7–12	2–4	7–12	3–4	1–5	13–6	—	4–3	12–7	4–2	8–12
Tampa Bay	9–10	10–9	5–1	2–5	3–3	5–2	1–6	3–3	2–4	7–12	4–3	3–4	—	2–5	10–9	14–6
Texas	6–1	5–2	3–3	3–3	5–2	13–6	4–3	7–12	3–3	5–2	9–10	7–12	5–2	—	2–4	11–9
Toronto	11–8	9–10	3–4	4–3	4–2	3–4	4–3	5–2	5–2	13–6	5–1	2–4	9–10	4–2	—	12–8

==== Detailed records ====
(End of regular season)

**American League**
Opponent	Home	Away	Total	Pct.	Runs scored	Runs allowed
**AL East**
Baltimore Orioles	1–2	0–3	1–5	.167	10	29
Boston Red Sox	3–0	1–2	4–2	.667	26	20
New York Yankees	2–1	3–1	5–2	.714	29	27
Tampa Bay Rays	1–2	4–0	5–2	.714	27	16
Toronto Blue Jays	2–2	1–2	3–4	.429	32	39
	**9–7**	**9–8**	**18–15**	**.545**	**126**	**134**
**AL Central**
Chicago White Sox	3–6	6–4	9–10	.474	66	73
**Cleveland Indians**	–	–	–	–	–	-
Detroit Tigers	3–6	4–5	7–11	.389	85	94
Kansas City Royals	4–6	5–4	9–10	.474	90	78
Minnesota Twins	4–6	3–6	7–12	.368	89	80
	**14–24**	**18–19**	**32–43**	**.427**	**330**	**345**
**AL West**
Houston Astros	3–1	2–1	5–2	.714	20	15
Los Angeles Angels	3–0	1–2	4–2	.667	29	15
Oakland Athletics	1–2	2–2	3–4	.429	16	17
Seattle Mariners	1–2	3–1	4–3	.571	27	23
Texas Rangers	1–2	2–1	3–3	.500	42	33
	**9–7**	**10–7**	**19–14**	**.576**	**134**	**102**

**National League**
Opponent	Home	Away	Total	Pct.	Runs scored	Runs allowed
Chicago Cubs	1–1	1–1	2–2	.500	11	22
Cincinnati Reds	3–0	2–1	5–1	.833	29	19
Milwaukee Brewers	2–0	1–1	3–1	.750	25	21
Pittsburgh Pirates	—	1–2	1–2	.333	8	8
St. Louis Cardinals	1–2	—	1–2	.333	6	10
	**7–3**	**5–5**	**12–8**	**.600**	**79**	**80**

=== Game log ===
2015 Game Log
April: 7–14 (Home: 2–7; Away: 5–7)

#	Date	Opponent	Score	Win	Loss	Save	Attendance	Record
1	April 6	@ Astros	2–0	Keuchel (1–0)	**Kluber** (0–1)	Gregerson (1)	43,573	0–1
2	April 8	@ Astros	2–0	**Carrasco** (1–0)	Feldman (0–1)	**Allen** (1)	23,078	1–1
3	April 9	@ Astros	5–1	**Bauer** (1–0)	Wojciechowski (0–1)		22,593	2–1
4	April 10	Tigers	8–4	Simón (1–0)	**McAllister** (0–1)	Soria (1)	35,789	2–2
5	April 11	Tigers	9–6	Krol (1–0)	**Allen** (0–1)		23,161	2–3
6	April 12	Tigers	8–5	Lobstein (1–0)	**House** (0–1)	Soria (2)	19,555	2–4
7	April 14	White Sox	4–1	Quintana (1–0)	**Carrasco** (1–1)	Robertson (2)	10,642	2–5
8	April 15	White Sox	4–2	**Bauer** (2–0)	Danks (0–2)	**Allen** (2)	11,042	3–5
9	April 17	@ Twins	3–2 (11)	Boyer (1–1)	**Shaw** (0–1)		21,307	3–6
10	April 18	@ Twins	4–2	**Salazar** (1–0)	Hughes (0–3)	**Allen** (3)	23,949	4–6
11	April 19	@ Twins	7–2	May (1–1)	**House** (0–2)		17,923	4–7
12	April 20	@ White Sox	4–3	Robertson (1–0)	**Allen** (0–2)		13,055	4–8
13	April 21	@ White Sox	6–2	**Carrasco** (2–1)	Noesí (0–2)		14,032	5–8
14	April 22	@ White Sox	6–0	Samardzija (1–1)	**Kluber** (0–2)		14,429	5–9
15	April 24	@ Tigers	13–1	**Salazar** (2–0)	Greene (3–1)		28,192	6–9
16	April 25	@ Tigers	4–1	Simón (4–0)	**House** (0–3)	Soria (6)	35,473	6–10
17	April 26	@ Tigers	8–6	Lobstein (2–1)	**Carrasco** (2–2)	Soria (7)	30,698	6–11
18	April 27	Royals	6–2	Vargas (2–1)	**Kluber** (0–3)		9,668	6–12
19	April 28	Royals	11–5	Finnegan (1–0)	**Atchison** (0–1)		10,698	6–13
20	April 29	Royals	7–5	**Salazar** (3–0)	Ventura (2–2)	**Allen** (4)	10,284	7–13
21	April 30	Blue Jays	5–1	Francis (1–0)	**House** (0–4)		9,798	7–14

May: 17–12 (Home: 8–7; Away: 9–5)

#	Date	Opponent	Score	Win	Loss	Save	Attendance	Record
22	May 1	Blue Jays	9–4	**Carrasco** (3–2)	Buehrle (3–2)		15,088	8–14
23	May 2	Blue Jays	11–4	Sanchez (2–2)	**Kluber** (0–4)		18,008	8–15
24	May 3	Blue Jays	10–7	**Rzepczynski** (1–0)	Francis (1–1)		16,128	9–15
25	May 5	@ Royals	5–3	Vargas (3–1)	**Salazar** (3–1)	Davis (6)	29,099	9–16
26	May 6	@ Royals	10–3	**Carrasco** (4–2)	Duffy (2–1)		23,316	10–16
27	May 7	@ Royals	7–4	Morales (3–0)	**Kluber** (0–5)	Holland (5)	38,271	10–17
28	May 8	Twins	9–3	Pelfrey (3–0)	**Bauer** (2–1)		19,102	10–18
29	May 9	Twins	7–4	Hughes (2–4)	**Chen** (0–1)	Perkins (11)	16,199	10–19
30	May 10	Twins	8–3	**Salazar** (4–1)	May (2–3)		13,769	11–19
31	May 12	Cardinals	8–3	Lynn (2–3)	**Carrasco** (4–3)		12,615	11–20
32	May 13	Cardinals	2–0	**Kluber** (1–5)	Lackey (2–2)	**Allen** (5)	12,313	12–20
33	May 14	Cardinals	2–1	Siegrist (2–0)	**Rzepczynski** (1–1)	Rosenthal (12)	15,865	12–21
34	May 15	@ Rangers	8–3	**Webb** (1–0)	Rodríguez (1–2)		29,524	13–21
35	May 16	@ Rangers	10–8	**Atchison** (1–1)	Feliz (1–2)	**Allen** (6)	31,045	14–21
36	May 17	@ Rangers	5–1	Martinez (3–0)	**Carrasco** (4–4)		32,189	14–22
37	May 18	@ White Sox	2–1 (10)	Duke (2–2)	**McAllister** (0–2)		17,712	14–23
38	May 19	@ White Sox	3–1	**Bauer** (3–1)	Quintana (2–4)	**Allen** (7)	15,681	15–23
39	May 20	@ White Sox	4–3	**Marcum** (1–0)	Jennings (0–1)	**Allen** (8)	15,146	16–23
40	May 21	@ White Sox	5–2	**Salazar** (5–1)	Danks (2–4)		18,321	17–23
41	May 22	Reds	7–3	**Carrasco** (5–4)	Leake (2–3)		23,617	18–23
42	May 23	Reds	2–1	**Kluber** (2–5)	Cingrani (0–1)	**Allen** (9)	27,315	19–23
43	May 24	Reds	5–2	**Bauer** (4–1)	Iglesias (1–1)		23,882	20–23
44	May 25	Rangers	10–8	Scheppers (1–0)	**Rzepczynski** (1–2)	Tolleson (4)	13,614	20–24
45	May 26	Rangers	4–3	Kela (4–1)	**Hagadone** (0–1)	Tolleson (5)	11,352	20–25
46	May 27	Rangers	12–3	**Carrasco** (6–4)	Lewis (4–3)		15,956	21–25
47	May 28	@ Mariners	5–3	**Kluber** (3–5)	Paxton (3–3)	**Allen** (10)	19,449	22–25
48	May 29	@ Mariners	2–1	Walker (2–5)	**Bauer** (4–2)	Rodney (14)	32,454	22–26
49	May 30	@ Mariners	4–3	**Marcum** (2–0)	Elias (2–2)	**Allen** (11)	32,287	23–26
50	May 31	@ Mariners	6–3 (12)	**McAllister** (1–2)	Leone (0–4)	**Adams** (1)	32,112	24–26

June: 11–15 (Home: 5–9; Away: 6–6)

#	Date	Opponent	Score	Win	Loss	Save	Attendance	Record
51	June 2	@ Royals	2–1	**Carrasco** (7–4)	Davis (2–1)	**Allen** (12)	30,361	25–26
52	June 3	@ Royals	4–2	Vargas (4–2)	**Kluber** (3–6)	Holland (8)	29,899	25–27
53	June 4	@ Royals	6–2 (8)	**Bauer** (5–2)	Young (4–2)		29,552	26–27
54	June 5	Orioles	5–2	Tillman (3–7)	**Marcum** (2–1)	Britton (15)	26,070	26–28
55	June 6	Orioles	2–1	**Salazar** (6–1)	Brach (3–2)	**Allen** (13)	24,939	27–28
56	June 7	Orioles	7–3	Norris (2–4)	**Carrasco** (7–5)		18,151	27–29
57	June 9	Mariners	3–2	Elias (3–3)	**Kluber** (3–7)	Smith (2)	11,425	27–30
58	June 10	Mariners	9–3	Walker (3–6)	**Bauer** (5–3)		12,305	27–31
59	June 11	Mariners	6–0	**Marcum** (3–1)	Happ (3–2)		15,316	28–31
60	June 12	@ Tigers	4–0	Price (6–2)	**Salazar** (6–2)		35,379	28–32
61	June 13	@ Tigers	5–4	**Carrasco** (8–5)	Hardy (2–1)	**Allen** (14)	41,620	29–32
62	June 14	@ Tigers	8–1	Simón (7–3)	**Kluber** (3–8)		36,994	29–33
	June 15	@ Cubs	Postponed (rain). Makeup: August 24					
63	June 16	@ Cubs	6–0	**Bauer** (6–3)	Arrieta (6–5)		35,914	30–33
64	June 17	Cubs	17–0	Wada (1–1)	**Marcum** (3–2)		15,572	30–34
65	June 18	Cubs	4–3	**McAllister** (2–2)	Wood (3–3)	**Shaw** (1)	15,891	31–34
66	June 19	Rays	4–1	Karns (4–3)	**Carrasco** (8–6)	Boxberger (17)	22,811	31–35
67	June 20	Rays	4–1	Cedeno (1–0)	**Kluber** (3–9)	Boxberger (18)	24,670	31–36
68	June 21	Rays	1–0	**Allen** (1–2)	Jepsen (1–5)		20,847	32–36
69	June 22	Tigers	8–5	Hardy (3–1)	**Bauer** (6–4)		15,746	32–37
70	June 23	Tigers	7–3	Price (7–2)	**Salazar** (6–3)		19,156	32–38
71	June 24	Tigers	8–2	**Carrasco** (9–6)	Farmer (0–2)		20,780	33–38
72	June 26	@ Orioles	4–3	O'Day (5–0)	**Rzepczynski** (1–3)	Britton (22)	31,112	33–39
	June 27	@ Orioles	Postponed (rain). Makeup: June 28 (Game 2)					
73	June 28	@ Orioles	4–0	Jiménez (7–3)	**Bauer** (6–5)		45,675	33–40
74	June 28	@ Orioles	8–0	Tillman (6–7)	**Murata** (0–1)		40,006	33–41
75	June 29	@ Rays	7–1	**Anderson** (1–0)	Karns (4–4)		11,802	34–41
76	June 30	@ Rays	6–2	**Salazar** (7–3)	Ramírez (6–3)		10,437	35–41

July: 13–13 (Home: 5–9; Away: 8–4)

#	Date	Opponent	Score	Win	Loss	Save	Attendance	Record
77	July 1	@ Rays	8–1	**Carrasco** (10–6)	Colomé (3–4)		11,394	36–41
78	July 2	@ Rays	5–4 (10)	**Shaw** (1–1)	Cedeno (1–1)	**Allen** (15)	16,353	37–41
79	July 3	@ Pirates	5–2	**Bauer** (7–5)	Morton (6–2)	**Allen** (16)	38,840	38–41
80	July 4	@ Pirates	1–0	Locke (5–4)	**Anderson** (1–1)	Melancon (26)	37,928	38–42
81	July 5	@ Pirates	5–3	Cole (12–3)	**Salazar** (7–4)	Melancon (27)	36,812	38–43
82	July 6	Astros	9–4	Keuchel (11–3)	**Carrasco** (10–7)		13,516	38–44
83	July 7	Astros	2–0	**Kluber** (4–9)	Velasquez (0–1)	**Shaw** (2)	10,821	39–44
84	July 8	Astros	4–2	**Bauer** (8–5)	Thatcher (1–3)	**Allen** (17)	15,255	40–44
85	July 9	Astros	3–1	**Anderson** (2–1)	Oberholtzer (2–2)	**Allen** (18)	11,496	41–44
86	July 10	Athletics	5–1	**Salazar** (8–4)	Graveman (6–5)	**Allen** (19)	28,539	42–44
87	July 11	Athletics	5–4	O'Flaherty (1–2)	**McAllister** (2–3)	Clippard (17)	28,733	42–45
88	July 12	Athletics	2–0	Gray (10–3)	**Kluber** (4–10)		20,611	42–46
–	July 14	86th All-Star Game	National League vs. American League (Great American Ball Park, Cincinnati, Ohio)					
89	July 17	@ Reds	6–1	Leake (7–5)	**Bauer** (8–6)		38,982	42–47
90	July 18	@ Reds	9–4	**Kluber** (5–10)	DeSclafani (5–7)		39,588	43–47
91	July 19	@ Reds	5–3 (11)	**Rzepczynski** (2–3)	Villarreal (1–3)	**McAllister** (1)	36,302	44–47
92	July 21	@ Brewers	8–1	Garza (5–10)	**Salazar** (8–5)		34,379	44–48
93	July 22	@ Brewers	7–5	**Adams** (1–0)	Lohse (5–11)	**Allen** (20)	32,588	45–48
94	July 23	White Sox	8–1	Samardzija (7–5)	**Bauer** (8–7)		16,317	45–49
95	July 24	White Sox	6–0	Quintana (5–9)	Kluber (5–11)	—	26,553	45–50
96	July 25	White Sox	10–3	Sale (9–5)	**Carrasco** (10–8)		24,763	45–51
97	July 26	White Sox	2–1	Rodon (4–3)	**Salazar** (8–6)	Robertson (21)	17,751	45–52
98	July 27	Royals	9–4	Vólquez (10–5)	**Anderson** (2–2)	Blanton (2)	13,611	45–53
99	July 28	Royals	2–1	Davis (7–1)	**Bauer** (8–8)	Holland (22)	18,064	45–54
100	July 29	Royals	12–1	**Kluber** (6–11)	Guthrie (7–7)		19,767	46–54
101	July 30	@ Athletics	3–1	**Carrasco** (11–8)	Bassitt (0–4)		13,173	47–54
102	July 31	@ Athletics	2–1	**Salazar** (9–6)	Mujica (2–3)	**Allen** (21)	28,152	48–54

August: 16–12 (Home: 9–2; Away: 7–10)

#	Date	Opponent	Score	Win	Loss	Save	Attendance	Record
103	August 1	@ Athletics	5–1	Brooks (1–0)	**Anderson** (2–3)		19,046	48–55
104	August 2	@ Athletics	2–1 (10)	Rodriguez (2–1)	**Allen** (1–3)		21,498	48–56
105	August 3	@ Angels	5–4	Richards (11–8)	**Kluber** (6–12)	Street (26)	37,030	48–57
106	August 4	@ Angels	2–0 (12)	**McAllister** (3–3)	Alvarez (2–3)	**Allen** (22)	38,159	49–57
107	August 5	@ Angels	4–3	Bedrosian (1–0)	**Allen** (1–4)		33,099	49–58
108	August 7	Twins	10–9	May (8–7)	**Shaw** (1–2)	Perkins (30)	30,365	49–59
109	August 8	Twins	17–4	**Bauer** (9–8)	Santana (2–3)		31,666	50–59
110	August 9	Twins	8–1	**Kluber** (7–12)	Hughes (10–8)		21.305	51–59
111	August 11	Yankees	5–4 (16)	**Adams** (2–0)	Pinder (0–2)		23,618	52–59
112	August 12	Yankees	2–1	**Salazar** (10–6)	Sabathia (4–9)	**Allen** (23)	18,844	53–59
113	August 13	Yankees	8–6	Eovaldi (12–2)	**Bauer** (9–9)	Miller (25)	23,076	53–60
114	August 14	@ Twins	6–1	**Kluber** (8–12)	May (8–8)		26,910	54–60
115	August 15	@ Twins	4–1	Duffey (1–1)	**Tomlin** (0–1)		30,601	54–61
116	August 16	@ Twins	4–1	Milone (6–3)	**Carrasco** (11–9)	Perkins (31)	27,244	54–62
117	August 17	@ Red Sox	8–2	**Salazar** (11–6)	Barnes (3–3)		32,701	55–62
118	August 18	@ Red Sox	9–1	Rodríguez (7–5)	**Bauer** (9–10)		31,907	55–63
119	August 19	@ Red Sox	6–4	Kelly (6–6)	**Kluber** (8–13)	Tazawa (1)	32,465	55–64
120	August 20	@ Yankees	3–2	**Tomlin** (1–1)	Nova (5–5)	**Allen** (24)	36,129	56–64
121	August 21	@ Yankees	7–3	**Carrasco** (12–9)	Tanaka (9–6)	**Allen** (25)	35,940	57–64
122	August 22	@ Yankees	6–2	Severino (1–2)	**Salazar** (11–7)		47,031	57–65
123	August 23	@ Yankees	4–3	**Shaw** (2–2)	Betances (6–3)	**Allen** (26)	46,945	58–65
124	August 24	@ Cubs	2–1	Rondon (5–2)	**McAllister** (3–4)		36,283	58–66
125	August 25	Brewers	11–6	**Tomlin** (2–1)	Peralta (4–8)		11,687	59–66
126	August 26	Brewers	6–2	**Manship** (1–0)	Nelson (10–10)		13,052	60–66
127	August 28	Angels	3–1	**Bauer** (10–10)	Gott (2–2)	**Allen** (27)	22.273	61–66
128	August 29	Angels	8–3	**Shaw** (3–2)	Smith (4–4)		22,843	62–66
129	August 30	Angels	9–2	**Tomlin** (3–1)	Weaver (6–10)		22,328	63–66
130	August 31	@ Blue Jays	4–2	**Salazar** (12–7)	Price (13–5)	**Allen** (28)	46,643	64–66

September/October: 17–14 (Home: 10–7; Away: 7–7)

#	Date	Opponent	Score	Win	Loss	Save	Attendance	Record
131	September 1	@ Blue Jays	5–3 (10)	Lowe (1–2)	**Shaw** (3–3)		41,356	64–67
132	September 2	@ Blue Jays	5–1	Dickey (10–10)	**Bauer** (10–11)		46,538	64–68
133	September 4	@ Tigers	8–1	**Tomlin** (4–1)	Lobstein (3–6)		26,378	65–68
134	September 5	@ Tigers	6–0	Simón (12–9)	**Salazar** (12–8)		28,949	65–69
135	September 6	@ Tigers	4–0	**Anderson** (3–3)	Verlander (3–7)		28,964	66–69
136	September 7	@ White Sox	3–2	**Bauer** (11–11)	Sale (12–8)	**Allen** (29)	14,757	67–69
137	September 8	@ White Sox	7–4	Rodon (7–6)	**Carrasco** (12–10)		11,990	67–70
138	September 9	@ White Sox	6–4	**Tomlin** (5–1)	Samardzija (9–12)	**Allen** (30)	11,667	68–70
139	September 10	Tigers	7–5	**Allen** (2–4)	Hardy (4–3)		11,166	69–70
—	September 11	Tigers	Postponed (rain). Makeup: September 13 (Game 2)					
—	September 12	Tigers	Cancelled (rain)					
140	September 13	Tigers	7–2	**Anderson** (4–3)	Verlander (3–8)		—	70–70
141	September 13	Tigers	9–2	VerHagen (1–0)	**Bauer** (11–12)		14,487	70–71
142	September 14	Royals	8–3	**Carrasco** (13–10)	Vólquez (13–8)		10,356	71–71
143	September 15	Royals	2–0	Medlen (4–1)	**Tomlin** (5–2)	Holland (31)	10,516	71–72
144	September 16	Royals	5–1	**Salazar** (13–8)	Duffy (7–8)		11,103	72–72
145	September 17	Royals	8–4	Ventura (12–8)	**Kluber** (8–14)	Holland (32)	13,125	72–73
146	September 18	White Sox	12–1	**Anderson** (5–3)	Sale (12–10)		16,149	73–73
147	September 19	White Sox	4–3	Rodon (8–6)	**Carrasco** (13–11)	Robertson (30)	16,390	73–74
148	September 20	White Sox	6–3	**Tomlin** (6–2)	Danks (7–13)	**Allen** (31)	13,282	74–74
149	September 22	@ Twins	3–1	Santana (6–4)	**Salazar** (13–9)	Jepsen (13)	21,850	74–75
150	September 23	@ Twins	4–2	Hughes (11–9)	**Kluber** (8–15)		17,831	74–76
151	September 24	@ Twins	6–3	**Anderson** (6–3)	Gibson (10–11)	**Allen** (32)	21,366	75–76
152	September 25	@ Royals	6–0	**Carrasco** (14–11)	Vólquez (13–9)		37,049	76–76
153	September 26	@ Royals	9–5	**McAllister** (4–4)	Medlen (5–2)		38,167	77–76
154	September 27	@ Royals	3–0	Young (11–6)	**Salazar** (13–10)	Davis (14)	36,339	77–77
155	September 28	Twins	4–2	Milone (9–5)	**Kluber** (8–16)	Jepsen (14)	10,007	77–78
—	September 29	Twins	Postponed (rain). Makeup: September 30 (Game 1)					
156	September 30	Twins	7–1	Gibson (11–11)	**Carrasco** (14–12)		—	77–79
157	September 30	Twins	10–2	**Anderson** (7–3)	Pelfrey (6–11)		10,228	78–79
158	October 1	Twins	4–2	Perkins (3–5)	**Allen** (2–5)	Jepsen (15)	22,644	78–80
159	October 2	Red Sox	8–2	**Tomlin** (7–2)	Owens (4–4)		28,273	79–80
160	October 3	Red Sox	2–0	**Kluber** (9–16)	Breslow (0–4)	**Allen** (33)	17,342	80–80
161	October 4	Red Sox	3–1	**Salazar** (14–10)	Porcello (9–15)	**Allen** (34)	17,844	81–80

Legend: = Win = Loss = Postponement
Bold = Indians team member

== Player stats ==
=== Batting ===
Note: G = Games played; AB = At bats; R = Runs scored; H = Hits; 2B = Doubles; 3B = Triples; HR = Home runs; RBI = Runs batted in; AVG = Batting average; SB = Stolen bases

Player	G	AB	R	H	2B	3B	HR	RBI	AVG	SB
Austin Adams	3	1	0	0	0	0	0	0	.000	0
Jesus Aguilar	7	19	0	6	1	0	0	2	.316	0
Cody Allen	4	0	0	0	0	0	0	0	—	0
Abraham Almonte	51	178	30	47	9	5	5	20	.264	6
Cody Anderson	2	3	0	0	0	0	0	0	.000	0
Mike Avilés	98	290	37	67	10	0	5	17	.231	3
Trevor Bauer	3	6	0	1	0	0	0	0	.167	0
Michael Bourn	95	289	29	71	12	1	0	19	.246	13
Michael Brantley	137	529	68	164	45	0	15	84	.310	15
Carlos Carrasco	1	1	0	1	0	0	0	0	1.000	0
Lonnie Chisenhall	106	333	38	82	19	1	7	44	.246	4
Kyle Crockett	3	0	0	0	0	0	0	0	—	0
Yan Gomes	95	363	38	84	22	0	12	45	.231	0
Nick Hagadone	1	0	0	0	0	0	0	0	—	0
Brett Hayes	14	32	4	5	0	0	3	6	.156	0
Tyler Holt	9	20	2	2	0	0	0	0	.100	0
Chris Johnson	27	90	6	26	3	0	1	7	.289	0
Jason Kipnis	141	565	84	171	43	7	9	52	.303	12
Corey Kluber	2	6	0	0	0	0	0	0	.000	0
Francisco Lindor	99	390	50	122	22	4	12	51	.313	12
Jeff Manship	4	0	0	0	0	0	0	0	—	0
Michael Martínez	16	30	6	8	2	0	0	2	.267	0
Zach McAllister	7	0	0	0	0	0	0	0	—	0
Adam Moore	1	4	0	1	0	0	0	1	.250	0
Brandon Moss	94	337	36	73	17	1	15	50	.217	0
David Murphy	84	206	22	61	12	1	5	27	.296	0
Roberto Perez	70	184	30	42	9	1	7	21	.228	0
Ryan Raburn	82	173	22	52	16	1	8	29	.301	0
José Ramírez	97	315	50	69	13	3	6	27	.219	10
Marc Rzepczynski	4	0	0	0	0	0	0	0	—	0
Danny Salazar	2	4	0	0	0	0	0	0	.000	0
Jerry Sands	50	123	11	29	5	1	4	19	.236	0
Carlos Santana	154	550	72	128	29	2	19	85	.231	11
Bryan Shaw	3	0	0	0	0	0	0	0	—	0
Nick Swisher	30	101	6	20	4	0	2	8	.198	0
Giovanny Urshela	81	267	25	60	8	1	6	20	.225	0
Zach Walters	12	30	0	4	0	0	0	3	.133	0
Ryan Webb	4	0	0	0	0	0	0	0	—	0
Team totals	161	5439	669	1396	303	28	141	640	.257	86

=== Pitching ===
Note: W = Wins; L = Losses; ERA = Earned run average; G = Games pitched; GS = Games started; SV = Saves; IP = Innings pitched; H = Hits allowed; R = Runs allowed; ER = Earned runs allowed; BB = Walks allowed; K = Strikeouts

Player	W	L	ERA	G	GS	SV	IP	H	R	ER	BB	K
Austin Adams	2	0	3.78	28	0	1	33.1	37	15	14	13	23
Cody Allen	2	5	2.99	70	0	34	69.1	56	26	23	25	99
Cody Anderson	7	3	3.05	15	15	0	91.1	77	32	31	24	44
Shawn Armstrong	0	0	2.25	8	0	0	8.0	5	2	2	2	11
Scott Atchison	1	1	6.86	23	0	0	19.2	23	15	15	4	12
Trevor Bauer	11	12	4.55	31	30	0	176.0	152	90	89	79	170
Carlos Carrasco	14	12	3.63	30	30	0	183.2	154	75	74	43	216
Bruce Chen	0	1	12.79	2	2	0	6.1	17	9	9	1	4
Kyle Crockett	0	0	4.08	31	0	0	17.2	17	9	8	7	15
Gavin Floyd	0	0	2.70	7	0	0	13.1	11	4	4	4	7
Nick Hagadone	0	1	4.28	36	0	0	27.1	30	16	13	12	28
T. J. House	0	4	13.15	4	4	0	13.0	21	19	19	12	7
Corey Kluber	9	16	3.49	32	32	0	222.0	189	92	86	45	245
CC Lee	0	0	5.40	2	0	0	1.2	4	1	1	1	3
Jeff Manship	1	0	0.92	32	0	0	39.1	20	4	4	10	33
Shaun Marcum	3	2	5.40	7	6	0	35.0	32	21	21	11	30
Zach McAllister	4	4	3.00	61	1	1	69.0	70	28	23	22	84
Toru Murata	0	1	8.10	1	1	0	3.1	4	5	3	1	2
David Murphy	0	0	0.00	1	0	0	0.1	2	5	0	1	0
Ryan Raburn	0	0	0.00	1	0	0	0.2	1	2	0	1	0
Marc Rzepczynski	2	3	4.43	45	0	0	20.1	23	15	10	10	24
Danny Salazar	14	10	3.45	30	30	0	185.0	156	79	71	53	195
Bryan Shaw	3	3	2.95	74	0	2	63.0	59	24	21	19	54
Giovanni Soto	0	0	0.00	6	0	0	3.1	3	0	0	0	0
Anthony Swarzak	0	0	3.38	10	0	0	13.1	18	9	5	4	13
Josh Tomlin	7	2	3.02	10	10	0	65.2	47	22	22	8	57
Ryan Webb	1	0	3.20	40	0	0	50.2	46	21	18	12	31
Team totals	81	80	3.67	161	161	38	1432.2	1274	640	586	425	1407

== Roster ==
2015 Cleveland Indians
Roster
Pitchers: 49 Austin Adams; 37 Cody Allen; 56 Cody Anderson; 51 Shawn Armstrong; 48 Scott Atchison; 47 Trevor Bauer; 59 Carlos Carrasco; 52 Bruce Chen; 57 Kyle Crockett; 26 Gavin Floyd; 50 Nick Hagadone; 58 T. J. House; 28 Corey Kluber; 20 C. C. Lee; 53 Jeff Manship; 38 Shaun Marcum; 34 Zach McAllister; 61 Toru Murata; 35 Mark Rzepczynski; 31 Danny Salazar; 27 Bryan Shaw; 65 Giovanni Soto; 51 Anthony Swarzak; 43 Josh Tomlin; 54 Ryan Webb	Catchers: 10 Yan Gomes; 12 Brett Hayes; 45 Adam Moore; 55 Roberto Pérez; Infielders: 36 Jesús Aguilar; 4 Mike Avilés; 8 Lonnie Chisenhall; 30 Chris Johnson; 22 Jason Kipnis; 12 Francisco Lindor; 11 José Ramírez; 41 Carlos Santana; 39 Giovanny Urshela; 6 Zach Walters	Outfielders: 35 Abraham Almonte; 24 Michael Bourn; 23 Michael Brantley; 13 Tyler Holt; 1 Michael Martínez; 44 Brandon Moss; 7 David Murphy; 9 Ryan Raburn; 40 Jerry Sands; 33 Nick Swisher	Manager: 17 Terry Francona; Coaches: 15 Sandy Alomar Jr. (first base); -- Tim Belcher (special assistant); 46 Jason Bere (bullpen); 32 Mickey Callaway (pitching); 64 Armando Camacaro (bullpen catcher); 2 Brad Mills (bench); 82 Ricky Pacione (bullpen catcher); 60 Matt Quatraro (assistant hitting); -- Edwin Rodríguez (special assistant); 16 Mike Sarbaugh (third base); 29 Ty Van Burkleo (hitting)

== Farm system ==
Level	Team	League	Manager
AAA	Columbus Clippers	International League	Chris Tremie
AA	Akron RubberDucks	Eastern League	Dave Wallace
A-Advanced	Lynchburg Hillcats	Carolina League	Mark Budzinski
A	Lake County Captains	Midwest League	Shaun Larkin
A-Short Season	Mahoning Valley Scrappers	New York–Penn League	Travis Fryman
Rookie	AZL Indians	Arizona League	Anthony Medrano
Rookie	DSL Indians	Dominican Summer League	Jose Mejia

LEAGUE CHAMPIONS: Columbus
