= Tyler Holt =

American baseball player (born 1989)

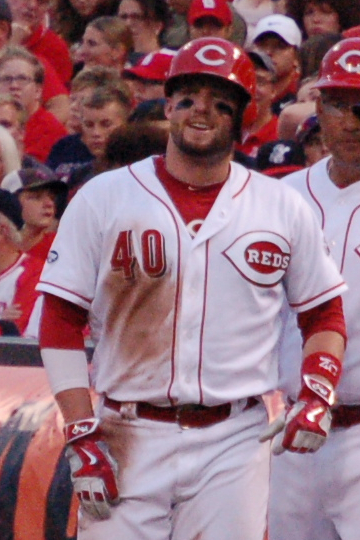
- Holt with the Cincinnati Reds in 2016

San Diego State Aztecs
- Outfielder / Coach
- Born: March 10, 1989 (age 37); Marion, Indiana, U.S.
- Batted: Right Threw: Right

MLB debut
- July 6, 2014, for the Cleveland Indians

Last MLB appearance
- October 2, 2016, for the Cincinnati Reds

MLB statistics
- Batting average: .228
- Home runs: 0
- Runs batted in: 15
- Stats at Baseball Reference

Teams
- Cleveland Indians (2014–2015); Cincinnati Reds (2015–2016)

Tyler Andrew Holt (born March 10, 1989) is an American college baseball coach and former professional baseball outfielder. He played in Major League Baseball (MLB) for the Cleveland Indians and Cincinnati Reds between 2014 and 2016, and is currently the outfielding and base running coach for the Boston College Eagles.

== Amateur career ==
A native of Marion, Indiana and raised in Gainesville, Florida, Holt attended Gainesville High School and Florida State University. He played college baseball for the Florida State Seminoles baseball team from 2008 to 2010 for head coach Mike Martin. In 2008, he played collegiate summer baseball with the Cotuit Kettleers of the Cape Cod Baseball League. In 2010, he had a batting average of .355 with 87 runs, 26 doubles, and 13 home runs for FSU.

== Professional career ==
=== Cleveland Indians ===
The Cleveland Indians selected Holt in the 10th round of the 2010 Major League Baseball draft. He began his minor league career that fall with the Class A Lake County Captains, where he had a .286 batting average in 22 games. In 2011, Holt spent the season with the Kinston Indians. In 123 games, he had a .254 average and 34 stolen bases. Holt split the 2012 season with the Carolina Mudcats and Akron Aeros, then spent the full 2013 season in Akron. Holt split 2014 with Akron and the Columbus Clippers, where he had a .308 batting average and 20 stolen bases in 59 games.

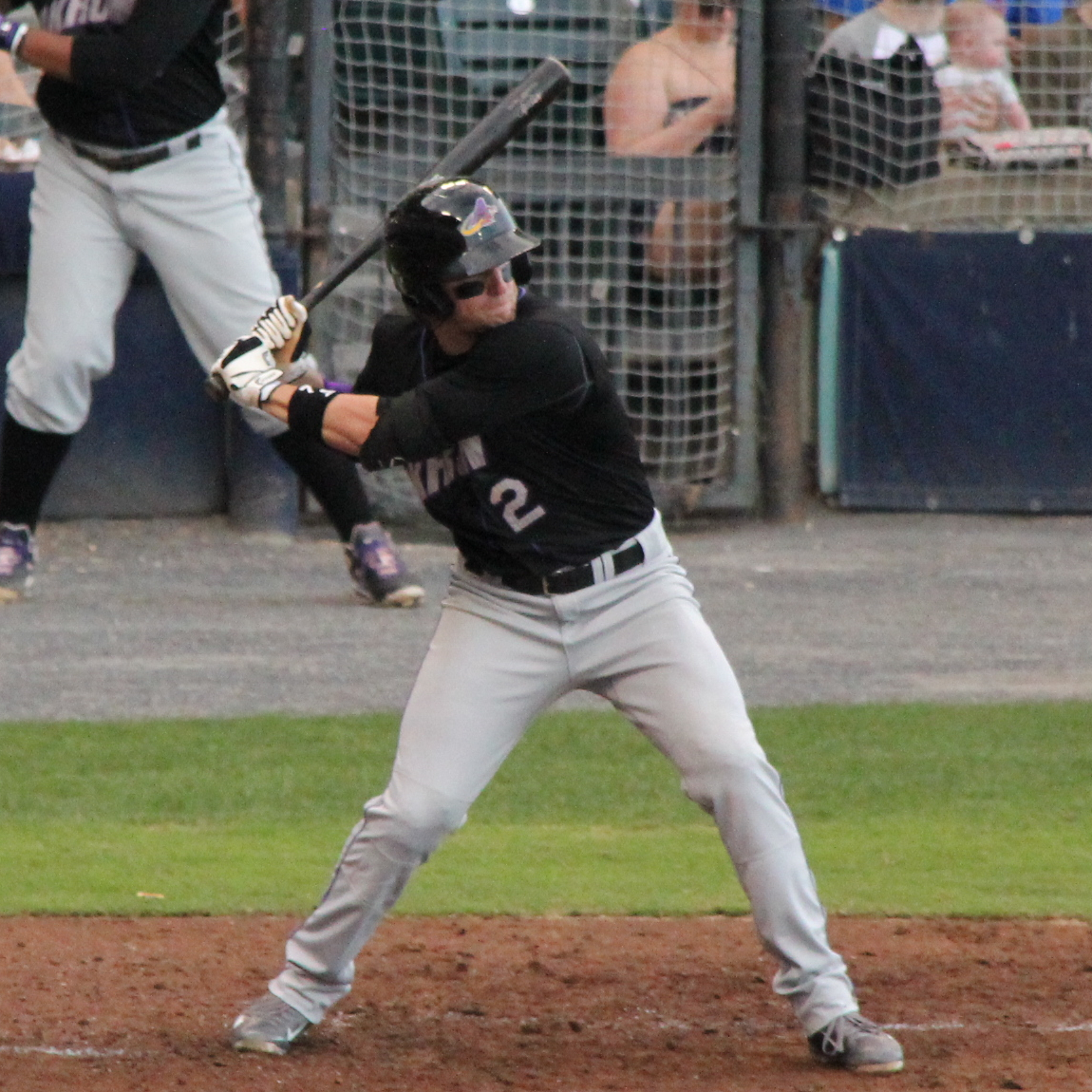
Holt batting for the Akron Aeros, double-A affiliates of the Cleveland Indians, in 2013

Holt was called up to the majors for the first time on July 6, 2014, and made his debut that night replacing Ryan Raburn in right field in the ninth inning, but did not make a plate appearance. Holt was optioned back to Triple-A Columbus on July 8. Holt was recalled on August 1. On August 13, Holt got his first major league hit with a single up the middle against the Arizona Diamondbacks.

Holt was sent back down to the minors only to be recalled on August 19, 2014, as Raburn was put back on the disabled list again. Holt made his first pinch hit debut as an Indian for Chris Dickerson in the sixth inning hitting a two-out, two-run double the same day as being called up again.

=== Cincinnati Reds ===
Holt was designated for assignment by the Indians on September 23, 2015. He was then claimed off waivers by the Cincinnati Reds. Holt made the Reds' Opening Day roster in the 2016 season.

Holt was called upon to pitch for the first time in his career in an August 22, 2016 game between the Reds and Los Angeles Dodgers at Great American Ball Park. The Dodgers had hit seven homers in the 18–9 game and the Reds' bullpen was depleted in the eighth inning. Holt pitched the ninth, delivering 60 mph knuckleballs and "batting-practice fastballs" to retire the side on 5 pitches.

=== Los Angeles Dodgers ===
Holt signed with the Dodgers as a minor league free agent for the 2017 season and was assigned to the Triple-A Oklahoma City Dodgers. He was in eight games for Oklahoma City and 12 for the Tulsa Drillers and was released on May 16.

=== Long Island Ducks and retirement ===
On March 27, 2018, Holt signed with the Long Island Ducks of the independent Atlantic League of Professional Baseball.

Holt announced his retirement on May 8, 2018.

== Personal ==
Holt is the son of Becky and Kenny Holt.
