= Stephen Kohlscheen =

- Pitcher
- Born: September 20, 1988 (age 37); York, Nebraska, U.S.
- Bats: Right Throws: Right
- Stats at Baseball Reference

Stephen K. Kohlscheen (born September 20, 1988) is an American former professional baseball pitcher. He played in Minor League Baseball for the Milwaukee Brewers' organization.

== Career ==
Kohlscheen attended Norman North High School in Norman, Oklahoma. The Florida Marlins selected him in the 43rd round of the 2007 MLB draft, but he opted not to sign. He enrolled at Cowley County Community College in Arkansas City, Kansas, and was selected by the Philadelphia Phillies in the 30th round of the 2009 MLB draft. Again, he chose not to sign. He transferred to Auburn University to play for the Auburn Tigers baseball team. With Auburn, Kohlscheen, had a 1-0 win–loss record, two saves, and a 6.49 earned run average (ERA) in 17 appearances.

=== Seattle Mariners ===
Kohlscheen was drafted by the Seattle Mariners in the 45th round of the 2010 Major League Baseball draft, and he chose to sign.

In 2014, the Mariners invited Kohlscheen to spring training as a non-roster player. They assigned Kohlscheen to the Jackson Generals of the Double–A Southern League, where he was named to appear in the league's All-star game. He was promoted to the Tacoma Rainiers of the Triple–A Pacific Coast League (PCL). Between Jackson and Tacoma, Kohlscheen pitched to a combined 3-1 win–loss record with a 2.70 ERA and 55 strikeouts against 10 walks.

=== San Diego Padres ===
On July 31, 2014, the Mariners traded Kohlscheen and Abraham Almonte to the San Diego Padres in exchange for Chris Denorfia. The Padres assigned him to the El Paso Chihuahuas of the PCL.

== Personal life ==
Kohlscheen's father, Brian, works as a scouting supervisor for the Phillies.
