= Chris Denorfia =

American baseball player (born 1980)

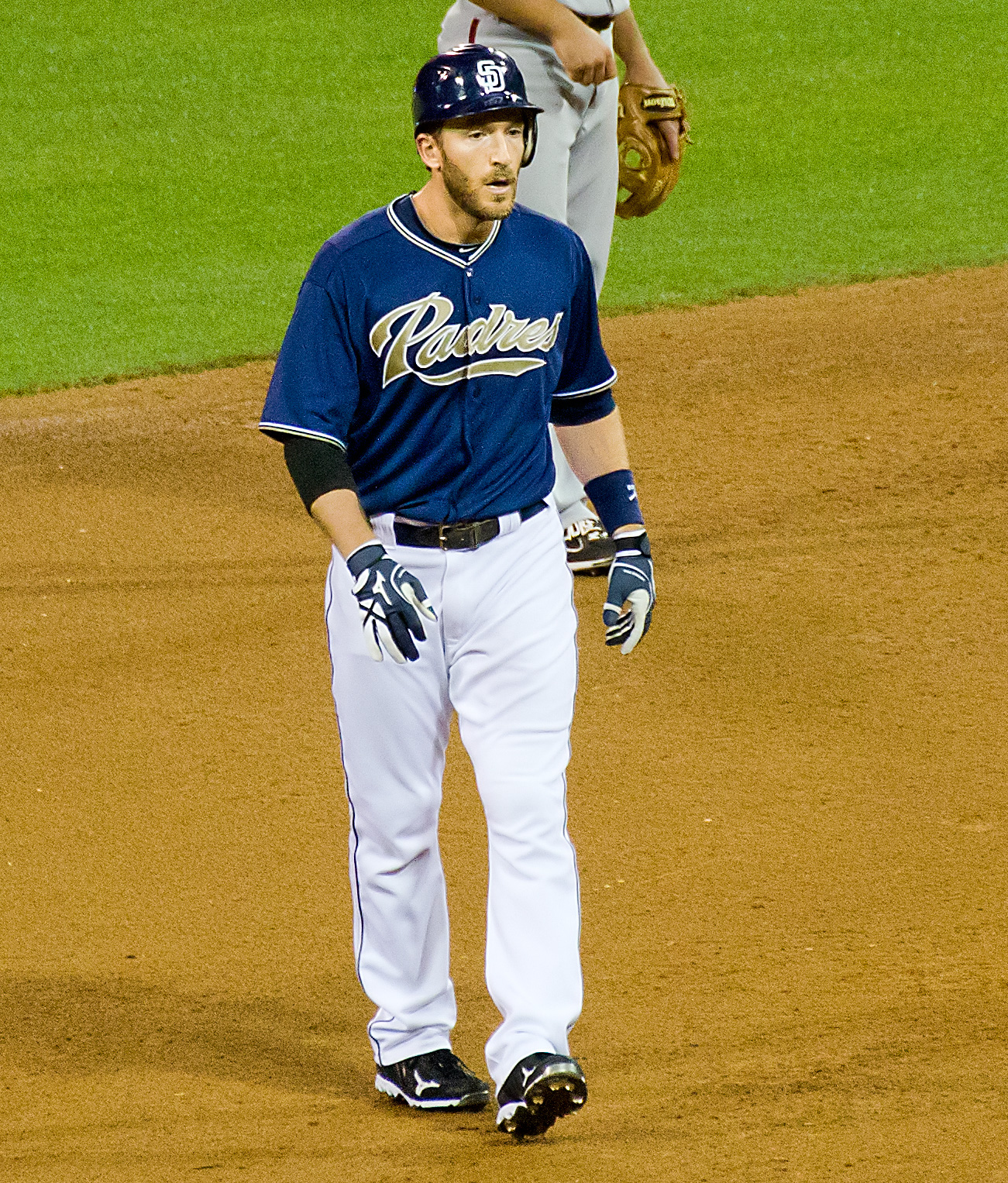
- Denorfia with the San Diego Padres in 2011

Chicago White Sox
- Outfielder / Coach
- Born: July 15, 1980 (age 46); Bristol, Connecticut, U.S.
- Batted: Right Threw: Right

MLB debut
- September 7, 2005, for the Cincinnati Reds

Last MLB appearance
- October 4, 2015, for the Chicago Cubs

MLB statistics
- Batting average: .272
- Home runs: 41
- Runs batted in: 196
- Stats at Baseball Reference

Teams
- As player: Cincinnati Reds (2005–2006); Oakland Athletics (2008–2009); San Diego Padres (2010–2014); Seattle Mariners (2014); Chicago Cubs (2015); As coach: Chicago Cubs (2019); Chicago White Sox (2026–present)

Christopher Anthony Denorfia (born July 15, 1980) is an American former professional baseball outfielder and current field coordinator for the Chicago White Sox of Major League Baseball (MLB). He played in MLB from 2005 to 2015 for the Cincinnati Reds, Oakland Athletics, San Diego Padres, Seattle Mariners, and Chicago Cubs. He played for the Italy national baseball team.

== Amateur career ==
Denorfia was born in Bristol, Connecticut, and is of Italian descent. Growing up in Southington, Connecticut, Denorfia attended Choate Rosemary Hall in Wallingford, Connecticut. A self-described "late bloomer", Denorfia played second base before having a growth spurt his junior year at the age of 16. Denorfia later attended Division III Wheaton College in Norton, Massachusetts, where he earned a degree, double majoring in international relations and Hispanic studies. At Wheaton, Denorfia was converted from shortstop to the outfield, and hit .467 during his senior year, drawing the attention of major league scouts. Denorfia's .467 batting average, along with several other impressive statistics, broke school records at Wheaton.

== Playing career ==
=== Cincinnati Reds ===
The Cincinnati Reds selected Denorfia in the 19th round of the 2002 MLB draft. Denorfia first reached the Major Leagues with the Reds in 2005 in the September roster expansion. He also appeared in 49 games with Cincinnati in 2006, moving back and forth between the big league club and the Triple-A Louisville Bats. Denorfia had Tommy John surgery on his right elbow in March 2007 after tearing a ligament during an exhibition game.

=== Oakland Athletics ===
On April 27, 2007, he was traded to the Oakland Athletics for Marcus McBeth, Ben Jukich, and cash. He missed the entire 2007 season as a result of the surgery, but returned in 2008, making Oakland's Opening Day roster. Denorfia played center and left field before being placed on the disabled list with back tightness in early May. He rehabbed with the Triple-A Sacramento River Cats and did not return to the Major League team until September. He finished the year batting .290 in 62 at-bats.

After Oakland's 2009 spring training camp, Denorfia was sent to Sacramento where he played 107 games across all three outfield positions. He appeared in only four games for the Major League club in mid-June and was moved off the 40-man roster at the end of the season.

=== San Diego Padres ===
On December 16, 2009, Denorfia signed a minor league contract with the San Diego Padres and received an invitation to spring training. Denorfia started 2010 in the Padres system, playing the outfield for the Triple-A Portland Beavers. He was called up on May 17 to replace the injured Scott Hairston. He pinch hit that same night, hitting a single. Denorfia remained with the big league club for the rest of the season, batting .271 with 9 home runs in 284 at-bats and starting 44 games in center field, 15 in left and 13 in right. On August 5, he hit an unusual inside-the-park home run in Dodger Stadium. The ball chopped off the dirt cut-out in front of the batter's box only four or five feet in front of Denorfia and then bounced out of the reach of the third baseman before being misplayed alongside the tarp down the left field line. SABR investigated the possibility that the play had set the record for least distance travelled through the air for a home run ball.

In December 2010, Denorfia and the Padres agreed on a one-year deal for the 2011 season. Denorfia started this season on the 25-man roster and played in a then-career-high 111 games for the big-league club. Denorfia strained his hamstring on July 31 and missed all of August on the DL and on rehab assignment. Denorfia made most of his 72 starts in right field and finished the season with a .277/.337/.381 batting line and 5 homers.

On December 12, 2011, Denorfia signed another one-year deal to avoid arbitration and began the 2012 season on the Padres 25-man roster. Denorfia and Will Venable formed a platoon in right field, with Denorfia starting against left-handed pitchers. Denorfia hit .337 for the year against lefties, versus .247 against righties. When not starting as part of the right field platoon, Denorfia made occasional starts in left and center and also had 33 at-bats as a pinch hitter. He appeared in 130 of the team's 2012 games, batting .293/.345/.451 with 8 homers.

On September 5, 2012, Denorfia signed an extension that would keep him in San Diego throughout the 2014 season.

With center-fielder Cameron Maybin absent for most of the 2013 season, Denorfia saw increased playing time, playing in a career-high 144 games. He made 51 starts in right field, 36 in center, and 14 in left. He was still used in a platoon role at times, and he hit for a .834 on-base plus slugging (OPS) against left-handers versus a .663 OPS against righties. For the season, he batted .279/.337/.395 with 10 home runs in 473 at-bats. Denorfia was chosen as the Padres' winner of the Heart & Hustle Award in September, and was also the Padres' recipient of the Wilson Defensive Player of the Year Award as he tied for 5th in the Major Leagues with 13 outfield assists.

Denorfia was the Padres Opening Day right fielder in 2014. He made 41 starts in right and 6 each in left and center before being traded. He batted .242 with 1 home run in 89 games for the Padres on the year.

=== Seattle Mariners ===
Denorfia was traded to the Seattle Mariners on July 31, 2014, for minor league outfielder Abraham Almonte and pitcher Stephen Kohlscheen.

Denorfia made 18 starts for the Mariners in right field and 3 in left. He collected 16 hits, including 2 home runs, in 82 at-bats over 32 games played.

=== Chicago Cubs ===
Denorfia signed a one-year contract worth a guaranteed $2.6 million plus $400k in incentives with the Chicago Cubs on January 9, 2015.

Denorfia was expected to form a platoon with Chris Coghlan in left field, but hamstring injuries delayed his start to the season and then put him on the disabled list for a month in May and early June. When he returned, he made a number of starts in right field in place of the injured Jorge Soler during June, but was relegated to a defensive replacement role for much of the year. In a blow-out loss against the Detroit Tigers on August 19, Denorfia made his first career pitching appearance, pitching to one batter to close out the game. On September 28, in the Cubs’ final regular season home game of the year, Denorfia hit a game-winning pinch-hit home run in the 11th inning to beat the Kansas City Royals, 1–0. He became the first pinch hitter in Major League history to hit a walk-off home run for the only run of the game. Denorfia made a total of 21 starts in left, 20 in right, and 4 in center in 2015, appearing in 103 games overall. He batted .269/.319/.373 with 3 home runs in 212 at-bats.

=== San Francisco Giants ===
On March 2, 2016, Denorfia signed a minor league contract with the New York Yankees that included an opt-out clause. After failing to make the team out of spring training, Denorfia exercised the clause and was released on March 27.

On June 9, 2016, Denorfia signed a minor league contract with the San Francisco Giants and was assigned to the Triple–A Sacramento River Cats. He was released by the Giants organization on August 16, despite hitting .269 in 42 games.

=== Colorado Rockies ===
On January 13, 2017, Denorfia signed a minor league contract with the Colorado Rockies. In 20 games for the Triple–A Albuquerque Isotopes, he batted .275/.383/.353 with two RBI and four stolen bases. Denorfia was released by the Rockies organization on May 29.

== Coaching career ==
On March 9, 2018, Denorfia retired and became a special assistant in the Chicago Cubs front office. In 2019, he joined the Cubs' coaching staff as a quality assurance coach. Following the hire of new manager David Ross after the 2019 season, it was announced that Denorfia would not return to the coaching staff. On January 7, 2020, he became the manager of the Hartford Yard Goats. On December 18, 2025, Denorfia was hired by the Chicago White Sox as their field coordinator.

== International baseball ==
Denorfia played for Italy in the 2009 World Baseball Classic, starting all three games in center field.

Denorfia again represented Italy in the 2013 World Baseball Classic, playing center field and batting second. He went 8 for 21 with 5 runs scored in the tournament.

At the 2023 World Baseball Classic Denorfia served as the hitting and third base coach for Italy.

== Personal life ==
Denorfia married his wife Lauren in 2009. His nickname is "Deno", popularized by a fan made tribute video on YouTube titled "Look at Deno", a spoof of the song "Look at me Now". It was his nickname at Wheaton College (MA), and in high school too.

Sporting positions
Preceded by Henry Blanco	Chicago Cubs quality control coach 2019-present	Incumbent
