= Abraham Almonte =

Dominican baseball player (born 1989)

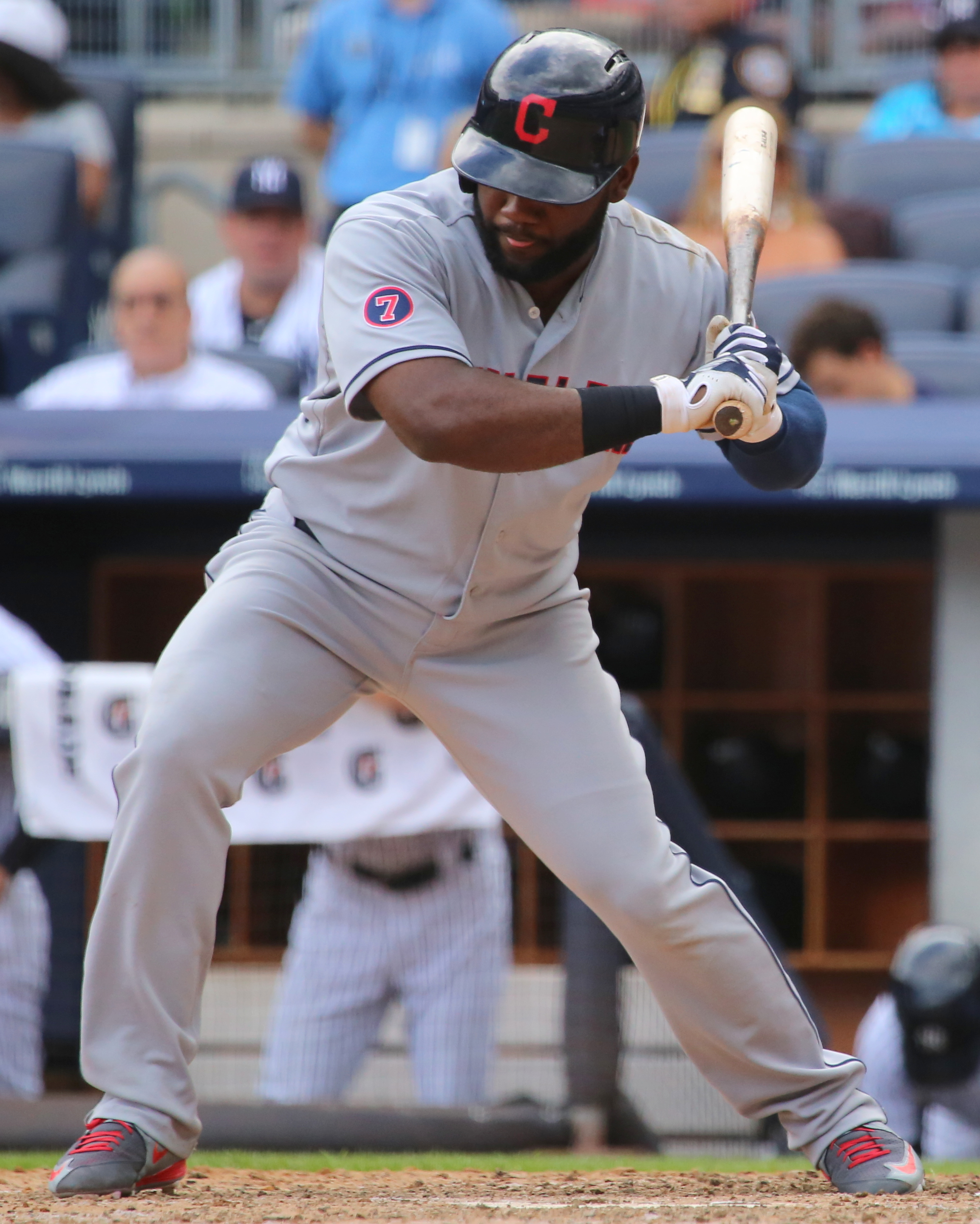
- Almonte batting for the Cleveland Indians in 2015

Piratas de Campeche – No. 84
- Outfielder
- Born: June 27, 1989 (age 37); Santo Domingo, Dominican Republic
- Bats: Switch Throws: Right

MLB debut
- August 30, 2013, for the Seattle Mariners

MLB statistics (through 2023 season)
- Batting average: .233
- Home runs: 24
- Runs batted in: 118
- Stats at Baseball Reference

Teams
- Seattle Mariners (2013–2014); San Diego Padres (2014–2015); Cleveland Indians (2015–2017); Kansas City Royals (2018); Arizona Diamondbacks (2019); San Diego Padres (2020); Atlanta Braves (2021); Boston Red Sox (2022); New York Mets (2023)

Abraham Almonte (born June 27, 1989) is a Dominican professional baseball outfielder for the Piratas de Campeche of the Mexican League. He has previously played in Major League Baseball (MLB) for the Seattle Mariners, Cleveland Indians, Kansas City Royals, Arizona Diamondbacks, San Diego Padres, Atlanta Braves, Boston Red Sox, and New York Mets.

The New York Yankees initially signed Almonte as a free agent. Before the 2013 season, he was traded to the Mariners for Shawn Kelley. Almonte was first called up to the major leagues at the end of August 2013.

== Early life ==
Almonte was born in Santo Domingo, Dominican Republic. When he was 16, his professional career began with the New York Yankees, as they signed him and brought him to the United States to play baseball.

== Career ==
=== New York Yankees ===
After being signed in 2005, was assigned to play in the Dominican Summer League (DSL) for the DSL Yankees. Almonte started his professional career as a second baseman, but was transitioned to outfield due to his speed and the organization's need for young outfielders. In 63 DSL games, he batted .254 with 26 runs batted in (RBIs), eight home runs, and a .409 on-base percentage (OBP), .450 slugging percentage (SLG), and a .859 on-base plus slugging (OPS). The following season in 2007, Almonte was promoted to the Yankees' Gulf Coast League team, where he excelled with a .288 batting average in 49 games. Over the next two seasons (2008–2009), Almonte played for the Charleston RiverDogs of the Single–A South Atlantic League. In 2009, Almonte batted .288 with 56 RBIs in 115 games. In 2010, shortly after being promoted to the Tampa Yankees of the High–A Florida State League, played only 15 games before undergoing surgery to repair a torn right labrum. He came back healthy in 2011 for Tampa, and reached a 34-game hit streak midseason. Almonte's performance earned him a promotion to the Trenton Thunder of the Double-A Eastern League. In 78 games, he batted .276 with four home runs and 25 RBIs.

=== Seattle Mariners ===
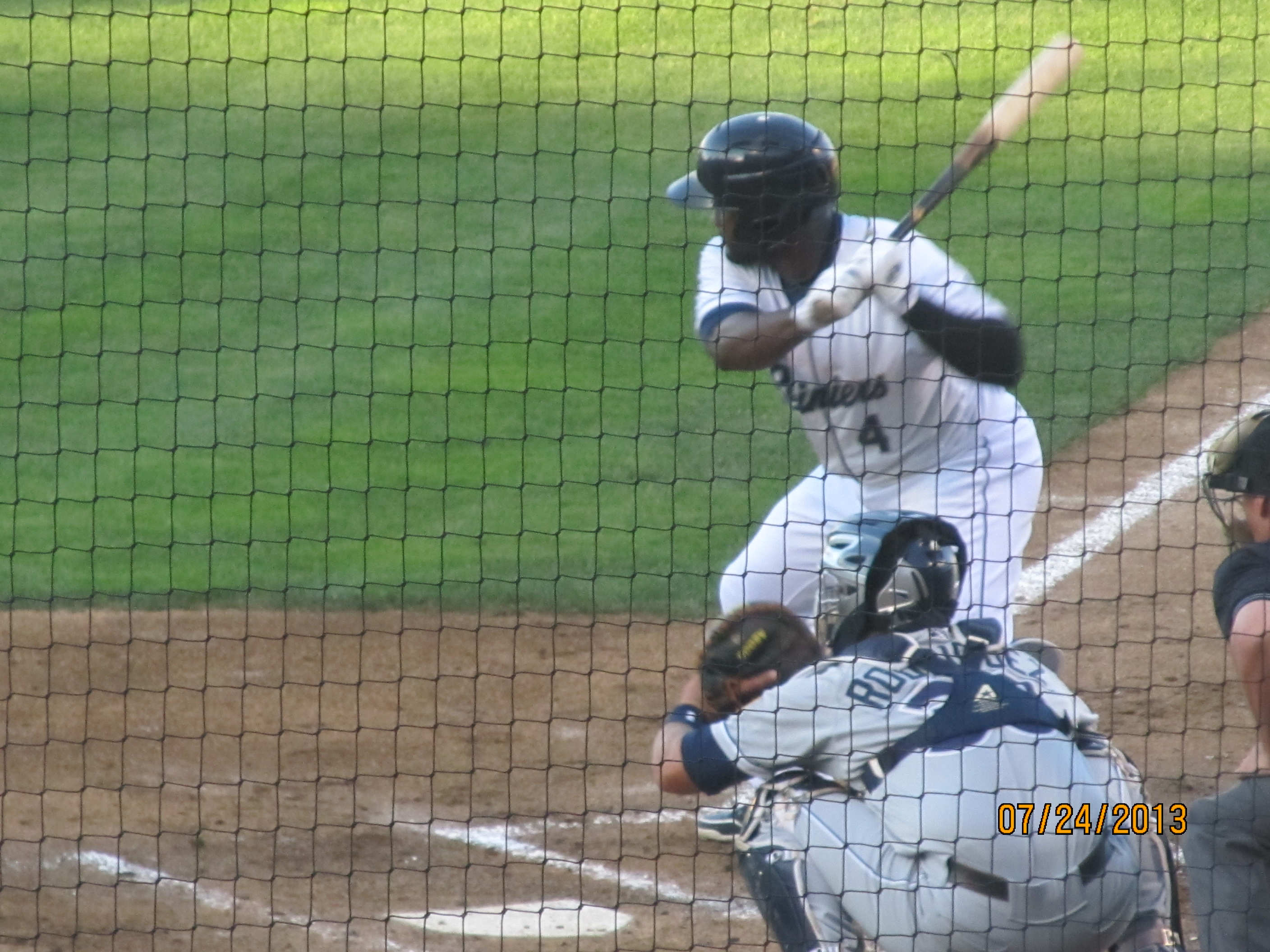
Almonte batting for the Tacoma Rainiers

On February 13, 2013, the Yankees traded Almonte to the Seattle Mariners for relief pitcher Shawn Kelley. Once becoming a Mariner, Almonte was first sent to the Jackson Generals of the Double-ASouthern League. While there, he hit .255 with 18 RBIs and 4 home runs in 29 games before impressing the organization enough to be called up to Triple-A with the Tacoma Rainiers. Almonte spent the majority of the 2013 campaign with the Tacoma Rainiers, playing in 94 games and batting .314 with 50 RBIs, 11 home runs, and a. 403 OBP, .491 SLG and an .894 OPS. These numbers were good enough to give Almonte a shot at the MLB level, as he was called up on August 30, 2013, and made his debut for the Seattle Mariners against the Houston Astros on the road in Houston, Texas. On September 9, Almonte hit his first major league home run against Astros' relief pitcher Chia Jen Lo.

Almonte began the 2014 regular season as the starting center fielder and leadoff hitter for the Mariners. Almonte played in 27 games early in the 2014 campaign, and struggled to produce at the major league level, only batting a mere .198 with eight RBIs, 40 strikeouts and a .248 OBP and .292 SLG. To halt the skid and rejuvenate the Mariners lineup, Almonte was optioned to Triple-A on May 5. Overall in part of two seasons with Seattle, Almonte appeared in 52 MLB games, batting .225 with three home runs and 17 RBIs.

=== San Diego Padres ===
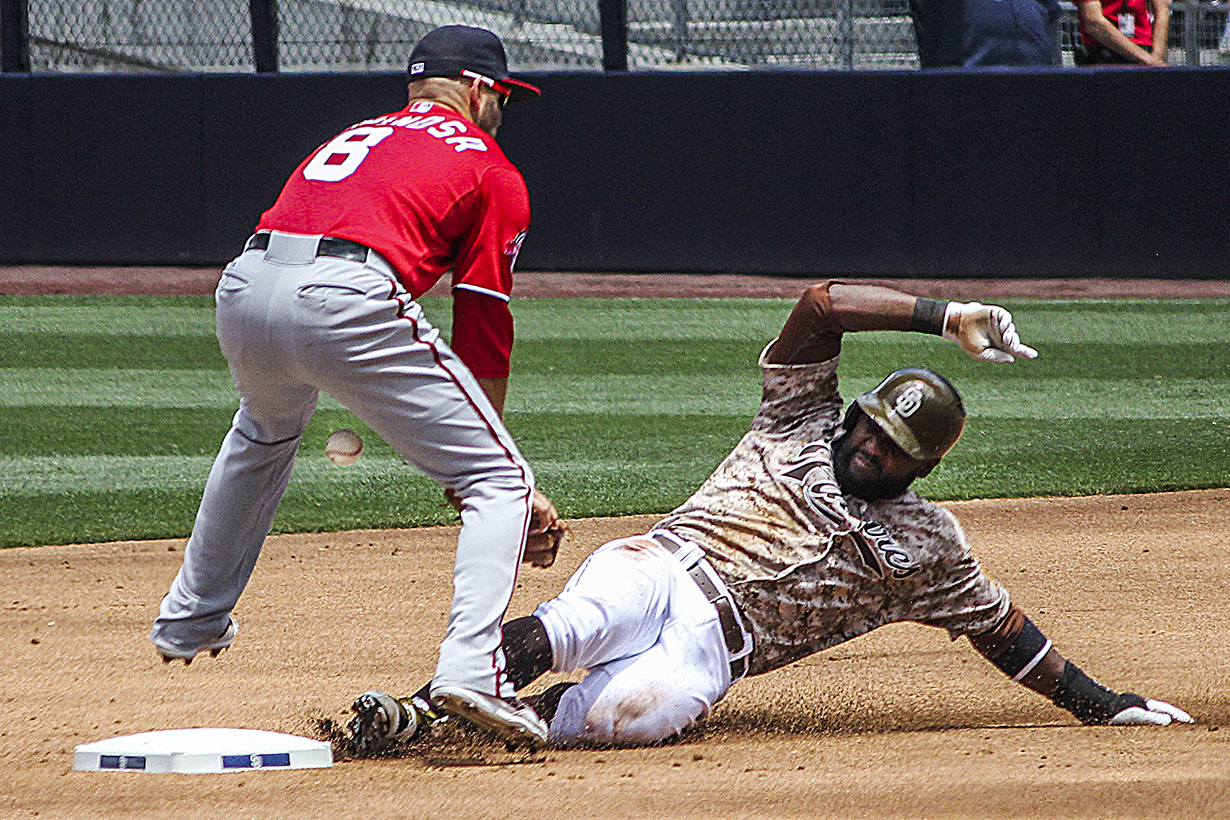
Almonte (right) playing for the San Diego Padres in 2015

On July 31, 2014, the Mariners traded Almonte and Stephen Kohlscheen to the San Diego Padres for Chris Denorfia. With the Padres through the remainder of the season, Almonte batted .265 in 32 games. During 2015, Almonte appeared in 31 games for San Diego, compiling a .204 batting average.

=== Cleveland Indians ===
On July 31, 2015, the Padres traded Almonte to the Cleveland Indians for Marc Rzepczynski. On August 8, Almonte was called up from the Columbus Clippers to start in center field. Almonte was suspended for 80 games on February 26, 2016, after testing positive for boldenone. Almonte was injured through portions of the 2017 season with the Indians, finishing with a .233 batting average and 3 home runs. He was designated for assignment on March 29, 2018.

In parts of three seasons with Cleveland, Almonte batted .254 with nine home runs and 56 RBIs in 187 games.

=== Kansas City Royals ===
Almonte was claimed by the Kansas City Royals on April 2, 2018. In 50 games with the Royals, be batted .179 with three home runs and nine RBIs. On July 16, he was designated for assignment and released a few days later.

=== Arizona Diamondbacks ===
On November 6, 2018, Almonte signed a minor league deal with the Arizona Diamondbacks. Almonte spent the 2019 minor league season with the Reno Aces. On September 1, 2019, the Diamondbacks selected Almonte's contract. In 17 MLB games with Arizona, Almonte batted .290 with one home run and four RBIs. He was outrighted off of the 40-man roster by the Diamondbacks on October 31, and elected free agency on November 4.

=== San Diego Padres (second stint) ===
On January 4, 2020, Almonte signed a minor league deal with the San Diego Padres. On August 3, the Padres selected Almonte's contract to the active roster. In seven games with the Padres, Almonte batted 1-for-11 (.091). He was designated for assignment on October 6 and elected free agency on October 8.

=== Atlanta Braves ===
On October 30, 2020, Almonte signed a major league contract with the Atlanta Braves. On March 27, 2021, Almonte was outrighted off of the 40-man roster. and assigned to the alternate training site. On May 31, Almonte was selected to the active roster. Almonte appeared in 64 games for the Braves, hitting .216 with five home runs and 19 RBIs. On August 27, Almonte was designated for assignment by the Braves. On September 3, Almonte cleared waivers and elected free agency.

=== Milwaukee Brewers ===
On October 15, 2021, Almonte signed a minor league contract with the Milwaukee Brewers. In 48 games during 2022 with the Triple-A Nashville Sounds, he batted .294 with 11 home runs and 42 RBI. Almonte did not appear in a major league game for Milwaukee.

=== Boston Red Sox ===
On July 25, 2022, Almonte was traded to the Boston Red Sox for cash considerations. He was assigned to the Triple-A Worcester Red Sox. Almonte was added to Boston's active roster on September 7, and he appeared as a pinch hitter for the team that evening. He appeared in 15 games with the Red Sox through the end of the season, batting .257 with one home run and two RBIs. He also played in 32 games for Worcester, batting .291 with seven home runs and 24 RBIs. On October 11, Almonte was designated for assignment following the waiver claim of Caleb Hamilton. He elected free agency four days later.

On December 5, 2022, Almonte agreed to a $400K contract with the LG Twins of the KBO League. However, on December 11, the Twins backed out of the deal after problems arose in Almonte's physical test.

=== New York Mets ===
On December 16, 2022, Almonte signed a minor league deal with the New York Mets organization. In 27 games for the Triple-A Syracuse Mets, he batted .228/.331/.564 with 11 home runs and 26 RBI. On August 7, 2023, the Mets selected Almonte's contract, adding him to the major league roster. In 3 games for the Mets, he went 1-for-7 with a walk. On August 12, Almonte was designated for assignment after Tim Locastro was activated from the injured list. He cleared waivers and was sent outright to Triple-A Syracuse on August 15. Just two days later, Almonte was selected back to the major league roster. He was designated for assignment again on August 27. Almonte cleared waivers and was again sent outright to Syracuse on August 30. On October 4, Almonte elected free agency.

=== Olmecas de Tabasco ===
On February 1, 2024, Almonte signed with the Olmecas de Tabasco of the Mexican League. In 89 appearances for Tabasco, he slashed .274/.425/.493 with 15 home runs, 49 RBI, with five stolen bases.

Almonte made 19 appearances for the Olmecas during the 2025 season, slashing .250/.400/.383 with one home run, five RBI, and one stolen base.

=== Guerreros de Oaxaca ===
On May 21, 2025, Almonte was traded to the Guerreros de Oaxaca in exchange for Marco Hernández. In 57 games for Oaxaca, he batted .300/.417/.500 with nine home runs, 50 RBI, and five stolen bases. On January 20, 2026, Almonte was released by the Guerreros.

=== Conspiradores de Querétaro ===
On March 6, 2026, Almonte signed with the Conspiradores de Querétaro of the Mexican League. In 26 games for the Conspiradores, he slashed .206/.359/.302 with one home run and two RBI. On May 27, Almonte was released by Quéretaro.

=== Piratas de Campeche ===
On June 16, 2026, Almonte signed with the Piratas de Campeche of the Mexican League.

== Personal life ==
=== Alcohol abuse and sobriety ===
In 2007 after the death of his father, Almonte began drinking alcohol on a daily basis to cope with his grief. As a teenager living in New York, Almonte would regularly go out to clubs on weekdays and drink all night prior to his training the next day. His alcohol addiction remained somewhat harmless until 2010. During the start of the Yankees' 2010 Campaign, Almonte was the team's starting second baseman for his minor league club. 15 games into the season Almonte tore his labrum in his right shoulder which would require surgery. With more time away from baseball than ever before, Almonte found more time to drink, which he would do even more frequently. The addiction became something that Almonte was aware of and wanted to put an end to, but the cravings were too strong and he didn't know how to stop them.

It wasn't until 2011 that Almonte was able to address and overcome his addiction. He credits the power of God as the thing that was able to make him realize alcohol was ruining his life. Almonte started regularly attending church and was able to make more time for family and friends. After only a month of sobriety, Almonte lost 30 pounds (14 kg) and rejuvenated his baseball career.

=== Faith ===
Almonte has openly claimed that his faith holds the key to his success. "God has something bigger," Almonte said in an interview with The News Tribune. "He is going to keep using me up here in the big leagues. No matter where they send me – big leagues, minor leagues, home, wherever they send me – I know I'm going to do whatever God wants me to do. Baseball or no baseball, if I do it to glorify God's name, I think I'll be OK."

== See also ==
- List of Major League Baseball players suspended for performance-enhancing drugs
