= Danny Salazar =

Dominican baseball player (born 1990)

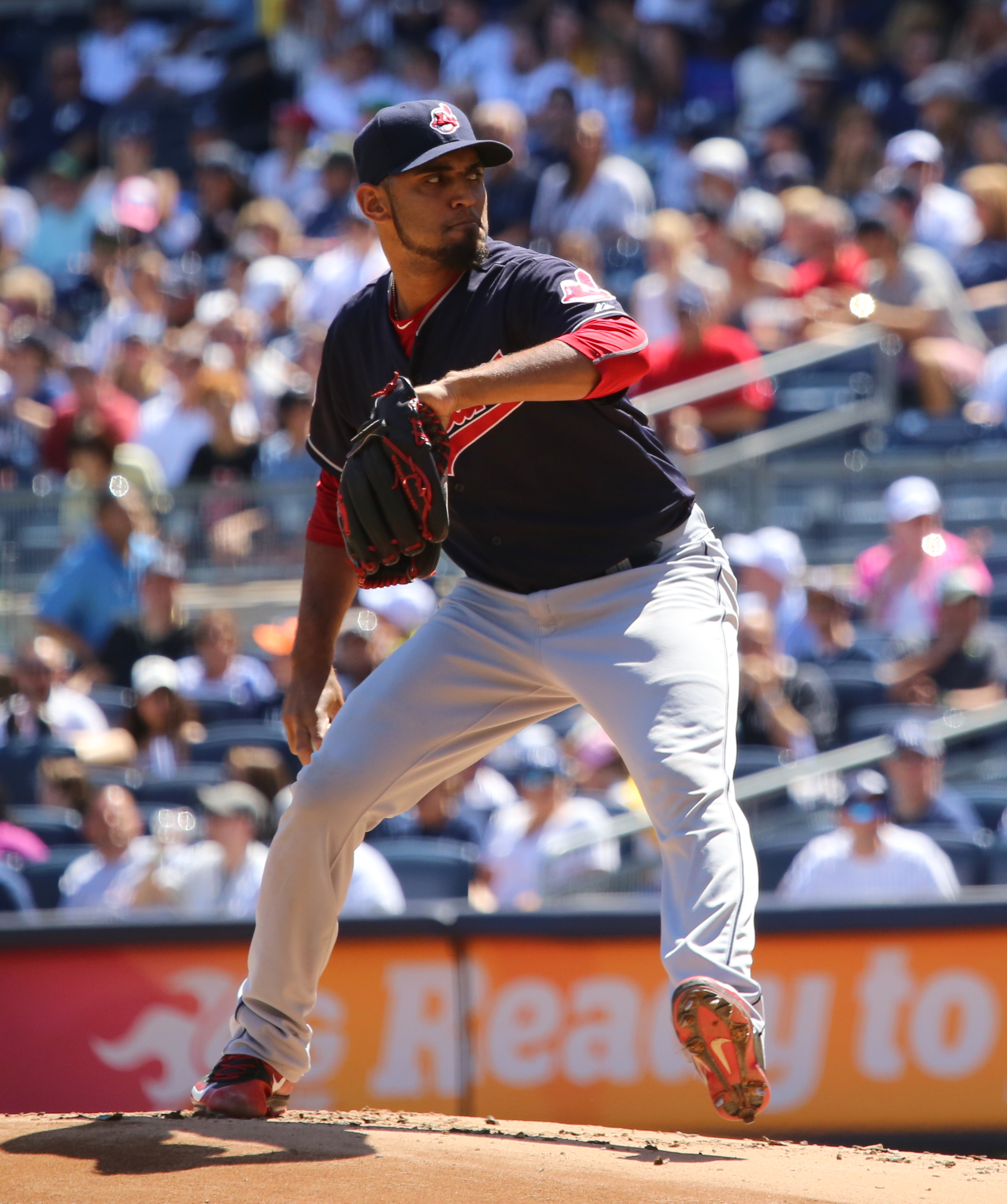
- Salazar pitching for the Cleveland Indians in 2015
- Starting pitcher / Pitching coach
- Born: January 11, 1990 (age 36); Cabrera, Maria Trinidad Sanchez, Dominican Republic
- Batted: Right Threw: Right

MLB debut
- July 11, 2013, for the Cleveland Indians

Last MLB appearance
- August 1, 2019, for the Cleveland Indians

MLB statistics
- Win–loss record: 38–34
- Earned run average: 3.82
- Strikeouts: 688
- Stats at Baseball Reference

Teams
- Cleveland Indians (2013–2017, 2019)

Career highlights and awards
- All-Star (2016)

Danny Dariel Salazar (born January 11, 1990) is a Dominican former professional baseball pitcher. He played in Major League Baseball (MLB) for the Cleveland Indians from 2013 to 2019.

== Playing career ==
=== Cleveland Indians ===
Salazar signed with the Indians as an international free agent in 2006. He spent two years playing rookie-level ball for the Indians, then spent 2009 through 2011 with the Lake County Captains. The Indians purchased his contract on November 18, 2011, to protect him from the Rule 5 draft. He spent 2012 with the Carolina Mudcats and Akron Aeros, For the week ending May 5, 2013, Salazar was named Eastern League Pitcher of the Week while playing for the Aeros, and was promoted to the Triple–A Columbus Clippers shortly afterward.

Salazar was recalled from the Triple-A Columbus Clippers on July 11, 2013, and made his Major League baseball debut as the starting pitcher against the Toronto Blue Jays. He took a no-hitter into the 6th inning, striking out seven batters in six full-innings of work, the most strikeouts for an Indians' starting pitcher in his major league debut since Luis Tiant struck out eleven batters in his debut in 1964. He was optioned back to Columbus on July 12. Danny Salazar was called up to make a spot start on August 7, 2013, against the Detroit Tigers. Salazar made his first career post-season start for the Indians against the Tampa Bay Rays in the 2013 American League Wild Card Game.

In 2014, Salazar split the season between the Indians and Clippers, pitching in 20 games for the major league club and finishing with a 6–8 record and a 4.25 ERA.

Salazar was named to the American League All-Star Team in 2016.

After struggling through his first 10 starts of the 2017 season, earning an ERA of 5.50, Salazar was moved to the bullpen on May 28, 2017, but resumed starting on July 22, 2017. He finished the season 5–6 with a 4.28 ERA in 19 starts, he also made 4 relief appearances. He struck out 145 in 103 innings.

He began the 2018 season on the 60 day disabled list. On June 30, 2018, it was announced Salazar would undergo exploratory surgery on his right shoulder. On July 2, 2018, Salazar officially underwent surgery on his right shoulder, suppressing his chances of playing in the MLB for the 2018 year. In the aftermath of the surgery, Salazar was required not to throw for 12 to 16 weeks. Salazar made his 2019 debut on August 1 against the Houston Astros, surrendering two runs on 66 pitches in a 7–1 loss. Salazar was placed back on the 10-day injured list the following day with a groin injury. On September 6, 2019, Salazar was transferred to the 60-day injured list, effectively ending his 2019 season with him having made only one appearance with the Indians. Following the 2019 season, Salazar was released by the Indians and became a free agent.

=== New York Yankees ===
On May 13, 2022, Salazar signed a minor league contract with the New York Yankees organization. He appeared in 2 games for the Triple-A Scranton/Wilkes-Barre RailRiders, and posted a 3.86 ERA with 4 strikeouts in 2 1/3 innings. Salazar was released by the Yankees organization on September 20.

=== Diablos Rojos del México ===
On June 15, 2024, Salazar signed with the Diablos Rojos del México of the Mexican League. He made two appearances for México, struggling to a 40.50 ERA with two strikeouts across 2/3 innings of relief. Salazar was released by the Diablos on June 22.

== Coaching career ==
On January 24, 2026, the Arizona Diamondbacks hired Salazar to serve as the pitching coach for the Dominican Summer League Diamondbacks.
