= Ryan Raburn =

American baseball player (born 1981)

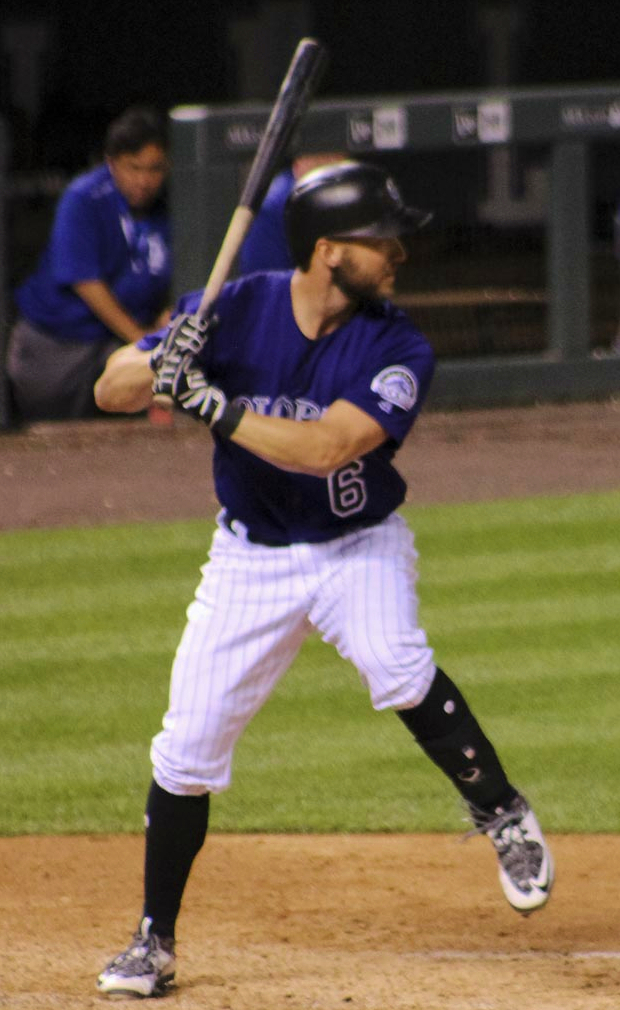
- Raburn with the Colorado Rockies in 2016
- Outfielder
- Born: April 17, 1981 (age 45); Tampa, Florida, U.S.
- Batted: Right Threw: Right

MLB debut
- September 12, 2004, for the Detroit Tigers

Last MLB appearance
- July 22, 2017, for the Washington Nationals

MLB statistics
- Batting average: .253
- Home runs: 93
- Runs batted in: 358
- Stats at Baseball Reference

Teams
- Detroit Tigers (2004, 2007–2012); Cleveland Indians (2013–2015); Colorado Rockies (2016); Washington Nationals (2017)

Ryan Neil Raburn (born April 17, 1981) is an American former professional baseball outfielder. He played in Major League Baseball (MLB) for the Detroit Tigers, Cleveland Indians, Colorado Rockies and Washington Nationals. While primarily an outfielder, he played every position except for catcher and shortstop during his career.

== Early career ==
Raburn attended Durant High School in Plant City, Florida. Following his prep career, he was selected in the 18th round of the 1999 Major League Baseball draft by his hometown Tampa Bay Devil Rays. Raburn, however, chose not to sign, opting instead to play for the University of Florida before transferring to South Florida Community College.

== Professional career ==
=== Detroit Tigers ===
After two seasons of college baseball, the Detroit Tigers selected Raburn in the 5th round of the 2001 Major League Baseball draft. Raburn signed and began playing in the minor leagues at third base, his natural position. He originally was a member of the Gulf Coast League Tigers, but was brought up to play on the Oneonta Tigers in July 2001. In 2001, Raburn was a part of Baseball America's short-season all-star team. At one point, he was the New York–Penn League's player of the week and his eight triples were the most in that league during the season. However, Raburn also committed 23 errors, which tied for the league most by third basemen. After the 2001 season was over, Baseball America named Raburn as Detroit's 18th-best prospect.

Raburn began 2002 unable to play because of a right hip strain. In July, he got back into action with a rehab stint in the Gulf Coast League. On July 17, he joined the West Michigan Whitecaps. He immediately started an eight-game hitting streak that lasted until July 25. During that stretch, Raburn posted a .355 batting average and drove in eight runs. During the 2002 season, Raburn appeared in 40 games with West Michigan. He batted .220, hit six home runs and totaled 28 runs batted in. After the season, Baseball America ranked Raburn as the Tigers' 25th-best prospect.

Raburn started off the 2003 season with West Michigan, but he appeared in only 16 games for the Whitecaps before moving on to the Lakeland Tigers in late April. In his 95 games with Lakeland, he batted .222, with 12 homers and 56 RBI.

In 2004, the Tigers, lacking depth in the middle infield, moved Raburn to second base. Raburn was a September call-up during the 2004 season for the Tigers. He made his big league debut on September 12 and struck out in his first at bat. On September 16, Raburn got his first hit, an RBI double on a pitch from Cleveland Indians pitcher CC Sabathia.

Raburn spent the entire 2005 season with Toledo, posting a .253 batting average and hitting 19 home runs in 130 games. He committed the most errors (21) by any second baseman in the International League. During the postseason, he batted .348 and drove in 3 runs. He was rated by Baseball America as the 18th-best minor league prospect for the Tigers at season's end.

Following the 2006 season, the Tigers chose to not add Raburn to the 40-man roster. This left him unprotected in the Rule 5 draft, allowing any team to add him for a cost of $50,000, provided he spent the entire season on a major league roster. Raburn was not selected and returned to the Tigers and their Triple-A affiliate Toledo Mud Hens.

==== 2007 season ====
Raburn returned to the major leagues for the first time since 2004 when Tigers utility infielder Neifi Pérez was suspended 25 games after testing positive for amphetamine usage. Raburn had a two-out RBI single in his first at bat of that season. On July 25 against the Chicago White Sox, Raburn went 4–5 with two home runs, a double and a single and had a total of seven RBIs.

Raburn earned the 2007 Tigers Rookie of the Year award from the Detroit Sports Broadcasters Association.

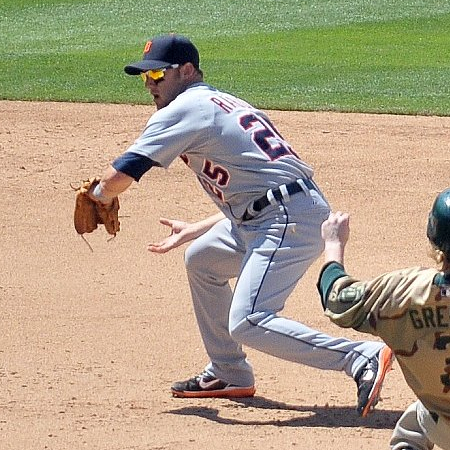
Raburn playing for the Detroit Tigers in 2008

==== 2008 season ====
For the first time in his career, Raburn started the season on Detroit's opening day roster. After getting into one game as a pinch runner, Raburn was sent down to Toledo on April 5. He made five appearances with the Mud Hens before rejoining the Tigers on April 13.

During the 2008 season, Raburn made sporadic starts at third base, second base, and all three outfield positions. Manager Jim Leyland often employed Raburn as a late-innings defensive replacement in the outfield or as a pinch runner.

Raburn hit his first career grand slam on June 28, 2008, against Colorado Rockies pitcher Jeff Francis.

Raburn matched a career-best with a four-hit game during a Tigers–White Sox contest on August 5.

==== 2009 season ====
During spring training, Raburn spent time learning the catcher position, as well as first base, in an effort to provide more versatility to his resume. He did not make the Tigers 25-man roster and began the 2009 season playing for the Toledo Mud Hens. He was called up to Detroit on April 22, three days after Marcus Thames was placed on the disabled list.

On June 8, 2009, Raburn made his first career start at first base. It was the sixth different position he had started at in the major leagues.

On June 23, 2009, Raburn hit his first career walk-off home run to lift the Tigers over the Chicago Cubs 5–4. According to Raburn, it was the first walk-off home run he had ever hit, including the minors leagues, college, high school, and Little League.

==== 2010 season ====
Raburn entered the 2010 season as a key bench player expecting to see time at every defensive position except catcher and shortstop. As of mid-June, he was regularly filling in for injured right fielder Magglio Ordóñez, but was hitting poorly. During the second half of the season, when he became an everyday starter primarily playing in the outfield, his bat heated up. By the end of 2010, he had played in 113 games, and sported a .280 batting average with 15 home runs and 61 RBIs.

==== 2011 season ====
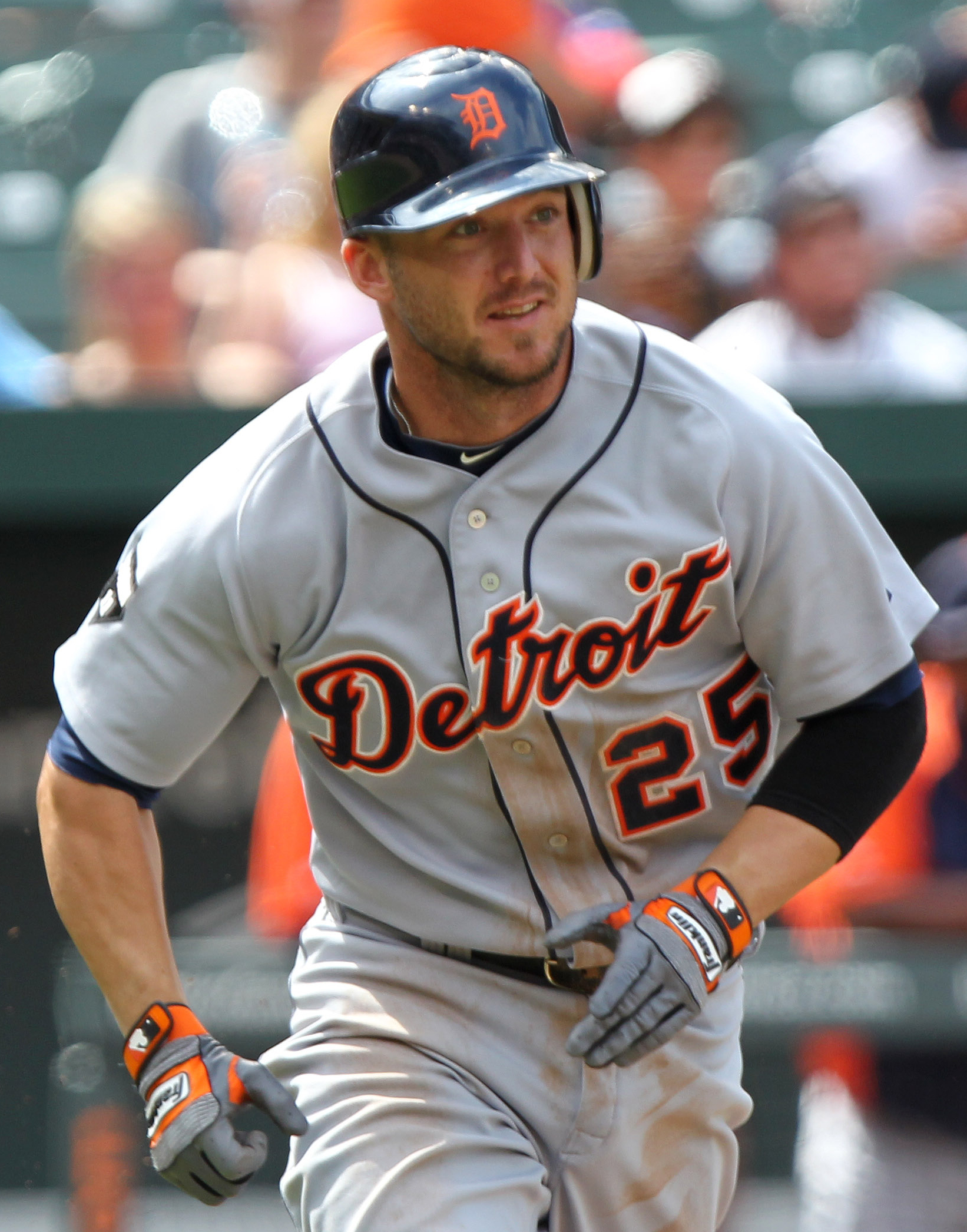
Raburn with the Detroit Tigers in 2011

Raburn signed a two-year contract extension after the 2010 season, and was a regular starter in left field at the beginning of the 2011 season. Near the end of May, Raburn took over at second base after Scott Sizemore was traded to the Oakland Athletics. In addition, another Tiger second baseman, Carlos Guillén, was on the disabled list through the entire first half. Raburn's batting average slumped in the first half (.213 at the All-Star break), but he showed flashes of power with eight home runs. Andy Dirks and new acquisition Delmon Young played Raburn's left field position for much of the second half while he saw more time at second base. After another strong second half, Raburn finished the 2011 regular season at .256 with 14 home runs and 49 RBIs in 387 at-bats.

==== 2012 season ====
Although his six Spring training homers shared the team lead, Raburn began the regular season mired in a significant slump, at one point batting .091 (4 for 44). He was eventually optioned to Toledo on May 30, 2012, with a batting average of .146. He was recalled on June 14. He finished the season with a .171 average, 1 home run, and 12 runs batted in; Raburn later revealed that his struggles during the 2012 season caused him to contemplate retirement.

On November 20, Raburn was released by the Tigers.

=== Cleveland Indians ===
On January 19, 2013, Raburn signed a minor league deal with the Cleveland Indians with an invitation to spring training. Raburn, after a solid spring, made the Indians' 2013 opening day roster.

Raburn won American League Player of the Week for the week of April 29–May 5, 2013 after batting .591 (13–22) with 5 runs, 4 HR, 9 RBI and a 1.773 OPS.

On August 7, 2013, it was announced that Raburn and the Indians had agreed on a two-year, $4.85 million extension with a $3 million club option for 2016. At the time of the deal, Raburn was hitting .277/.370/.565 with 13 HR and 38 RBI. The next day, after a 14 inning loss the night before, Cleveland called on Raburn, a utility player, to pitch the ninth inning of a 10-3 loss to the Detroit Tigers. He pitched a perfect 1-2-3 inning and struck out Matt Tuiasosopo.

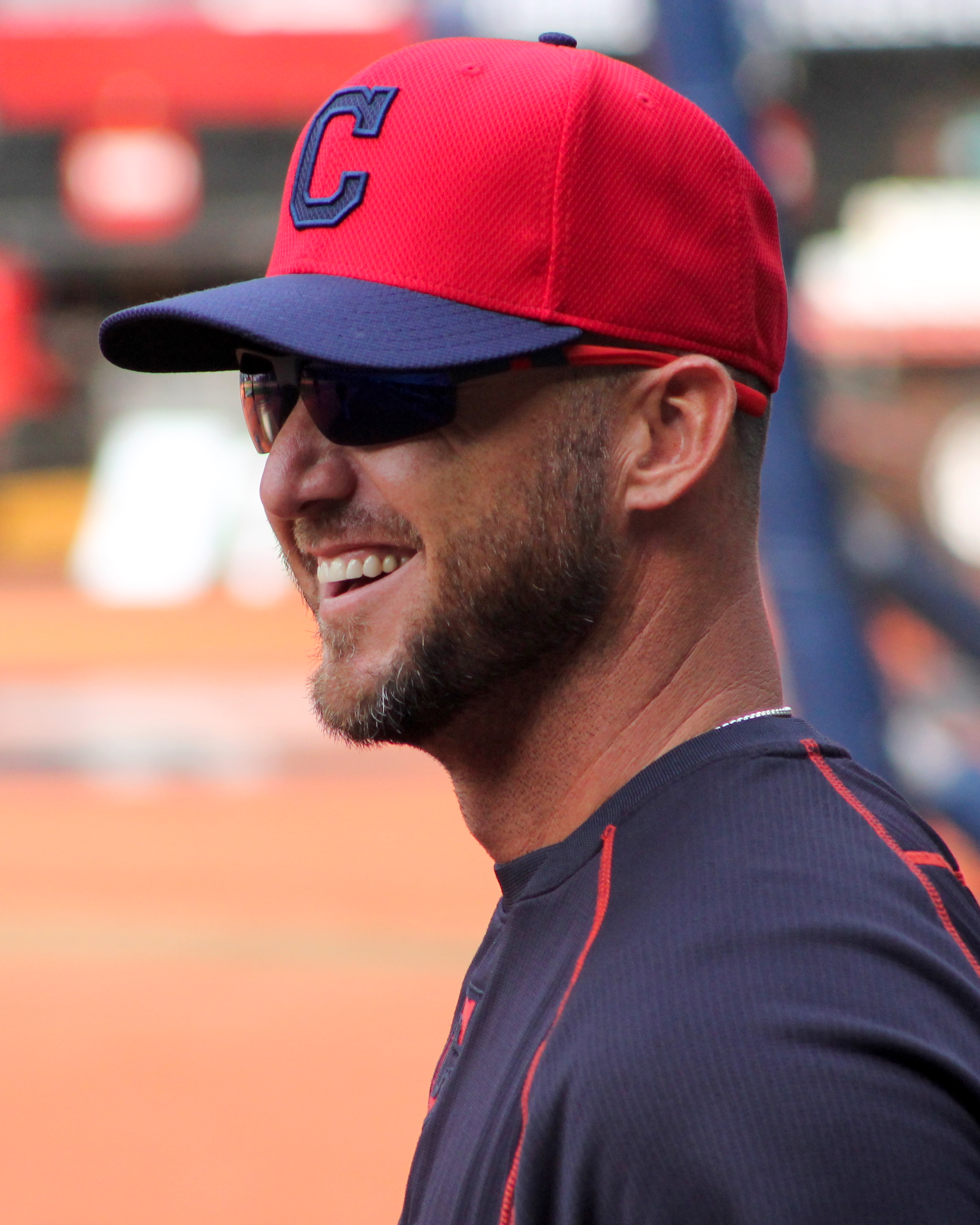
Raburn playing for the Cleveland Indians in 2015

Used mostly as a right fielder when Drew Stubbs wasn't playing, Raburn hit .272/.357/.543 with 16 HR and 55 RBI. Raburn, with Mike Avilés, Jason Giambi and Yan Gomes, was a member of the Indians bench dubbed the 'Goon Squad'. They combined to hit .256 with 45 HR and 170 RBI in 370 games.

=== Colorado Rockies ===
On March 4, 2016, Raburn signed a minor league deal with the Colorado Rockies. He was ejected for the first time as a Major League player on April 25, 2016. Raburn saw action in 113 games with the Rockies, recording a .220 batting average, 9 home runs, and 30 runs batted in.

=== Cincinnati Reds ===
On February 17, 2017, Raburn signed a minor league contract with the Cincinnati Reds. He was released by Cincinnati on March 27, 2017.

=== Chicago White Sox ===
On April 8, 2017, Raburn signed a minor league contract with the Chicago White Sox.

=== Washington Nationals ===
The White Sox traded Raburn to the Washington Nationals on May 26, 2017, for cash considerations or a player to be named later. He was promoted to the major leagues on June 5 after Jayson Werth was put on the disabled list. On July 3, Raburn's walk-off single in the bottom of the ninth gave the Nationals a 3-2 win over the Mets. He signed a new minor league contract with the Nationals on November 14, 2017. On March 24, 2018, Raburn was released.

== Honors ==
- 2001 Single-A All Star, New York–Penn League
- 2006 Triple-A All Star, International League
- 2007 Triple-A All Star, International League
- 2007 Detroit Tigers Rookie of the Year
- International League Player of the Month, June 2007
- American League Player of the Week, April 29 – May 5, 2013

== Personal life ==
Raburn is married to his wife Suzanne and they live in Balm, Florida. Raburn is the brother of former minor league utility player Johnny Raburn, who last played with a Milwaukee Brewers minor league affiliate in 2010.
