= Cody Anderson =

American baseball player (born 1990)

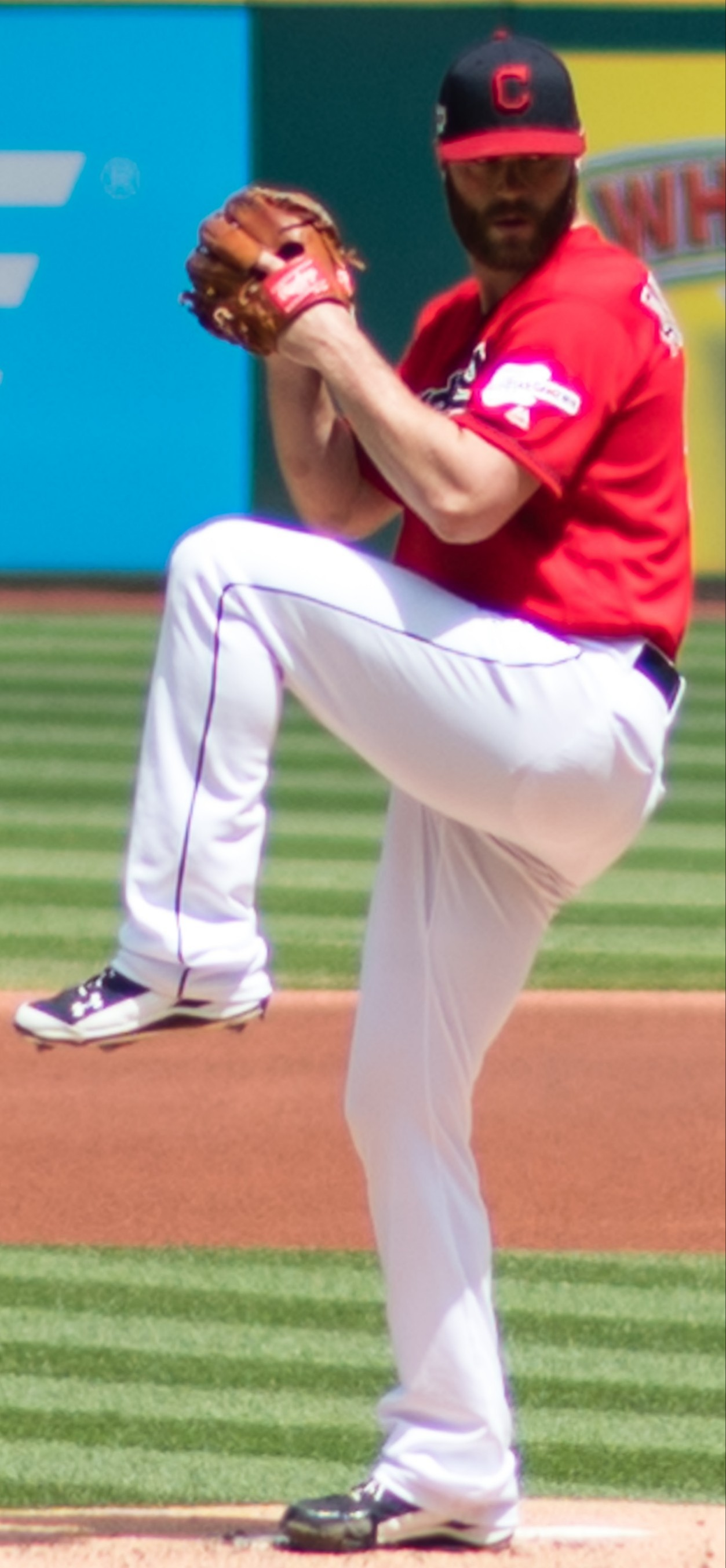
- Anderson with Cleveland Indians in 2019
- Pitcher
- Born: September 14, 1990 (age 35); Quincy, California, U.S.
- Batted: Right Threw: Right

MLB debut
- June 21, 2015, for the Cleveland Indians

Last MLB appearance
- May 10, 2019, for the Cleveland Indians

MLB statistics
- Win–loss record: 9–9
- Earned run average: 4.76
- Strikeouts: 107
- Stats at Baseball Reference

Teams
- Cleveland Indians (2015–2016, 2019)

Cody Andrew Anderson (born September 14, 1990) is an American former professional baseball pitcher who played in Major League Baseball (MLB) for the Cleveland Indians.

== Early life ==
Anderson was born September 14, 1990, in Quincy, California. Anderson attended Quincy Junior-Senior High School. Anderson attended Feather River College, where he was an outfielder and relief pitcher.

== Career ==
=== Minor league career ===
Anderson was drafted by the Tampa Bay Rays in the 17th round of the 2010 Major League Baseball draft, but did not sign and returned to college. He was then drafted by the Cleveland Indians in the 14th round of the 2011 Major League Baseball draft and signed. The Indians then converted him into a starting pitcher. He made his professional debut with the Mahoning Valley Scrappers that season.

Anderson pitched the 2012 season for the Lake County Captains. He finished the season 4–7 with a 3.20 earned run average with 72 strikeouts in 98 1/3 innings pitched over 24 games. Anderson started the 2013 season with the Carolina Mudcats and ended the season with the Akron Aeros. He finished the year with a 2.65 earned run average with 122 strikeouts over 136 innings in 26 starts. For his play he won the Bob Feller Award as the Indians best minor league pitcher, and was the Carolina League's Pitcher of the Year.

=== Major league career ===
After the 2014 season, the Indians added Anderson to their 40-man roster. On June 21, 2015, Anderson made his MLB debut against the Tampa Bay Rays going 7 2/3 innings with 4 strikeouts and 1 BB. On June 29, 2015, Anderson made his second career start against the Tampa Bay Rays. He had a perfect game going through 6 1/3 innings, until former Indian Grady Sizemore hit a home run. Anderson and the Indians won the game 7–1, while Anderson went 8 innings pitched, 1 earned run, striking out two, and two hits. On July 9, 2015, Anderson went 6 2/3 innings, giving up a home run to Houston Astros' Hank Conger to start the 3rd inning with one strike out, winning his second career game. In 15 starts for Cleveland, he went 7–3 with a 3.05 earned run average in 91 1/3 innings.

The 2016 season proved to be a difficult one for Anderson as he struggled to a 6.68 earned run average in 19 games, 9 of them starts. In 60 2/3 innings, he struck out 54 but also allowed 13 home runs.

Anderson injured the ulnar collateral ligament of his pitching elbow during the Indians' 2017 spring training camp. The Indians subsequently announced that Anderson required "Tommy John" surgery and would miss the entire 2017 season. He also missed the entire 2018 season recovering.

Following the 2019 season, Anderson was outrighted off the Indians roster and became a free agent.

=== Seattle Mariners ===
On February 17, 2020, Anderson signed a minor league deal with the Seattle Mariners. He was released on March 31.
