= Giovanni Soto =

Puerto Rican baseball pitcher (born 1991)

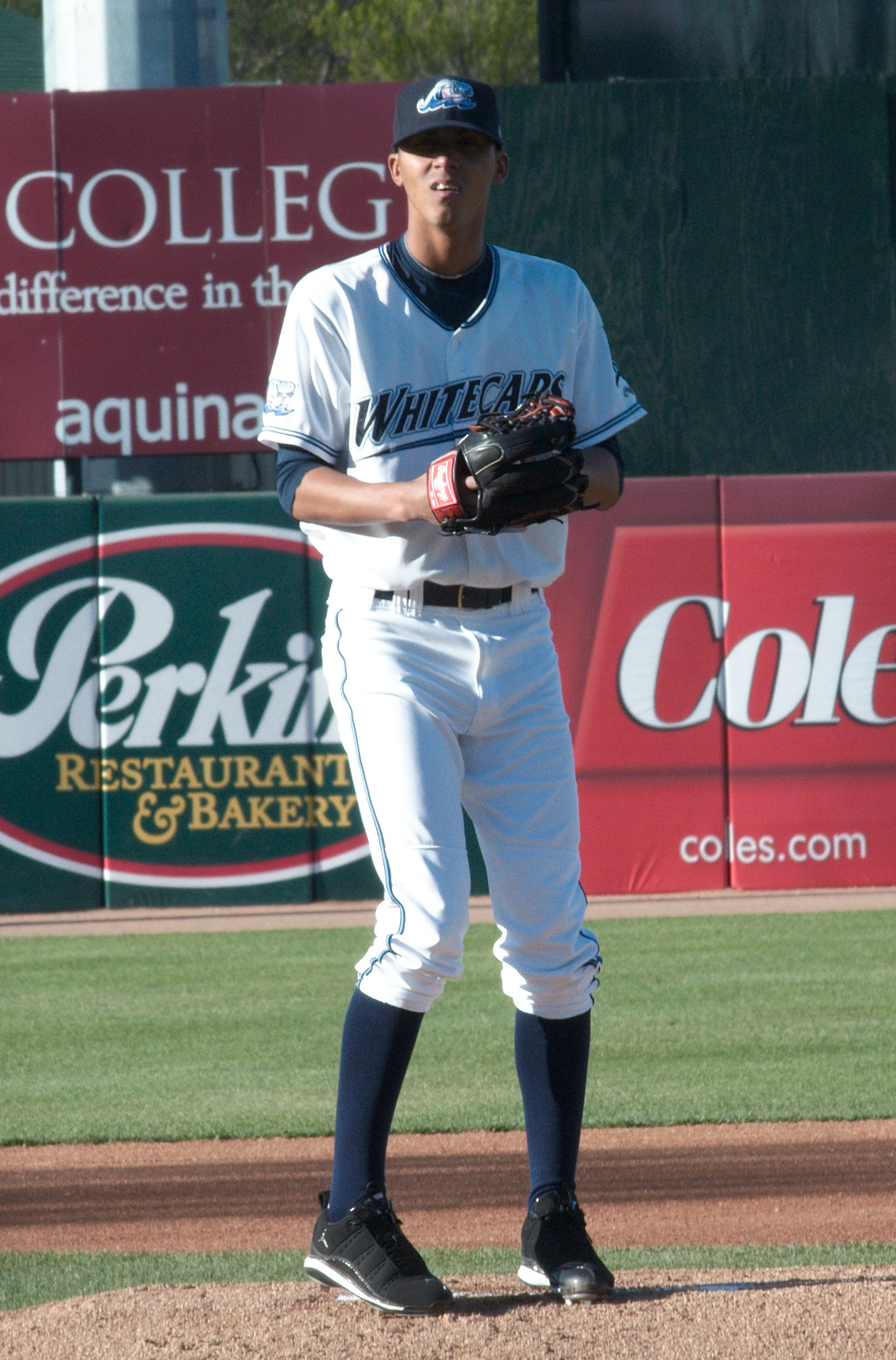
- Soto with the West Michigan Whitecaps in 2010
- Pitcher
- Born: May 18, 1991 (age 34); Carolina, Puerto Rico
- Batted: Left Threw: Left

MLB debut
- September 5, 2015, for the Cleveland Indians

Last MLB appearance
- September 27, 2015, for the Cleveland Indians

MLB statistics
- Win–loss record: 0–0
- Earned run average: 0.00
- Strikeouts: 0
- Stats at Baseball Reference

Teams
- Cleveland Indians (2015)
Medals
Men's baseball
Representing Puerto Rico
World Baseball Classic
Silver medal – second place	2013 San Francisco	Team
Silver medal – second place	2017 Los Angeles	Team
Pan American Games
Gold medal – first place	2019 Lima	Team

Giovanni Luis Soto (born May 18, 1991) is a Puerto Rican former professional baseball pitcher. He played in Major League Baseball (MLB) for the Cleveland Indians in 2015. He also played for the Puerto Rican national baseball team in the 2013 and 2017 World Baseball Classics.

== Career ==
=== Detroit Tigers ===
Soto attended Advanced Central College High School in Carolina, Puerto Rico. The Detroit Tigers selected Soto in the 21st round of the 2009 MLB draft.

=== Cleveland Indians ===
On July 28, 2010, the Tigers traded Soto to the Cleveland Indians in exchange for Jhonny Peralta. On July 15, 2012, while playing for the Double–A Akron Aeros, Soto pitched a no-hitter against the Altoona Curve.

The Indians invited Soto to spring training as a non–roster invitee in 2013. He also played for the Puerto Rican national baseball team in the 2013 World Baseball Classic where they lost to the Dominican Republic national baseball team in the championship game 3-0.

In 2015, Soto pitched for the Columbus Clippers of the Triple–A International League. Soto appeared in 46 games for Columbus, going 2-1 with a 2.68 ERA while striking out 51 in 53 2/3 innings. Following the conclusion of the Triple–A season, the Indians purchased Soto's contract on September 4, 2015 and added him to the major-league roster. Soto made his debut the next day against Detroit, retiring Tyler Collins on a single pitch, the only batter he faced. Soto made 6 appearances for Cleveland down the stretch, not giving up a run in 3 1/3 innings.

On April 3, 2016, Soto was designated for assignment by the Indians.

=== Chicago Cubs ===
On April 11, 2016, the Indians traded Soto to the Chicago Cubs for cash considerations, with Kyle Schwarber being transferred to the 60-day disabled list to make room on the roster. Soto spent 2016 with the Triple-A Iowa Cubs, where he posted a 1-3 record with a 5.14 ERA in 33 appearances. On October 22, Soto was designated for assignment, once again trading places on the roster with Schwarber as he was making an unexpected attempt to return to the Cubs during the postseason.

=== Chicago White Sox ===
On October 26, 2016, Soto was claimed off waivers by the Oakland Athletics. On November 7, Soto was claimed off waivers by the Chicago White Sox. He was released on June 9, 2017.

=== Road Warriors ===
Soto signed with the Road Warriors of the Atlantic League of Professional Baseball for the 2018 season. In nine starts for the Road Warriors, Soto posted a 1-3 record and 4.95 ERA with 40 strikeouts across 40 2/3 innings pitched. He became a free agent following the season.

=== New Britain Bees ===
On April 16, 2019, Soto signed with the New Britain Bees of the Atlantic League of Professional Baseball. In 27 appearances (five starts) for the Bees, he registered a 3-1 record and 3.14 ERA with 58 strikeouts and two saves across 48 2/3 innings pitched. Following the season, Soto's rights were acquired by the Sugar Land Skeeters in the New Britain Bees dispersal draft.

On February 14, 2020, Soto's contract was purchased by the Diablos Rojos del México of the Mexican League. In 2020, he did not play a game because of the cancellation of the Mexican League season due to the COVID-19 pandemic, and later became a free agent.

== See also ==
- List of Major League Baseball players from Puerto Rico
