= Austin Adams (baseball, born 1986) =

American baseball player (born 1986)

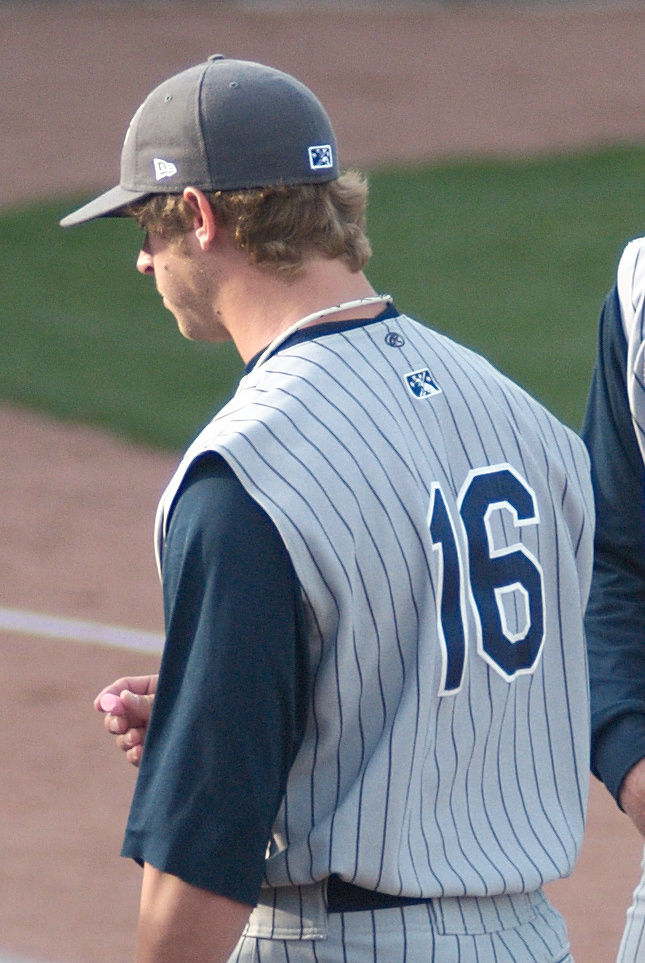
- Adams in 2010
- Pitcher
- Born: August 19, 1986 (age 40); Montgomery, Alabama, U.S.
- Batted: Right Threw: Right

MLB debut
- July 12, 2014, for the Cleveland Indians

Last MLB appearance
- July 6, 2019, for the Detroit Tigers

MLB statistics
- Win–loss record: 2–0
- Earned run average: 6.45
- Strikeouts: 58
- Stats at Baseball Reference

Teams
- Cleveland Indians (2014–2016); Minnesota Twins (2019); Detroit Tigers (2019)

Austin David Adams (born August 19, 1986) is an American former professional baseball pitcher. He played in Major League Baseball (MLB) for the Cleveland Indians, Minnesota Twins, and Detroit Tigers.

== Amateur career ==
Adams attended Stanhope Elmore High School in Millbrook, Alabama and played college baseball for Faulkner University. With Faulkner, he played shortstop and pitched; as a shortstop, he had a .372 batting average with 29 home runs. In 2008, he played collegiate summer baseball with the Hyannis Mets of the Cape Cod Baseball League.

== Professional career ==
=== Cleveland Indians ===
He was selected by the Cleveland Indians in the 2009 MLB draft. He began his minor league career with the Mahoning Valley Scrappers of the Class A-Short Season New York–Penn League. In 17 games, he had a win–loss record of 3–1 and an earned run average (ERA) of 4.86. The following season, he pitched for the Lake County Captains of the Class A Midwest League and the Kinston Indians of the Class A-Advanced Carolina League. Adams pitched in 13 games each for the two squads, and with Kinston he had a 6–1 record and a 1.53 ERA. Between both teams, he had 112 strikeouts in 112 innings pitched.

In 2011, Adams spent the season with the Akron Aeros of the Class AA Eastern League, where he had an 11–10 record, a 3.77 ERA, and 131 strikeouts in 26 appearances. He was invited to spring training with the Indians the following year, but suffered a shoulder injury. He had surgery on it in may of that year, and missed the 2012 season. In 2013, the Indians converted him into a relief pitcher and assigned him to the Aeros for the season. He had a 2.62 ERA and 76 strikeouts in 45 games; the Indians added him to their 40-man roster after the season.

Adams began the 2014 season with the Columbus Clippers of the Class AAA International League, and spent the first three months of the season with them. He was promoted to the Indians on July 11 after pitching in 30 games for the Clippers, and he made his major league debut the following day. Adams made 28 appearances for the Indians in 2015, compiling a 3.78 ERA and earning 1 save. On February 7, 2017, Adams was designated for assignment by the Indians.

=== Los Angeles Angels ===
On February 10, 2017, the Indians traded Adams to the Los Angeles Angels for a player to be named later or cash considerations. He was designated for assignment on April 2. On April 5, Adams cleared waivers and was sent outright to the Triple-A Salt Lake Bees. He would pitch in 6 games split between Salt Lake and the rookie–level Orem Owlz, registering a 3.60 ERA with four strikeouts and one save across 5.0 innings pitched. Adams elected free agency following the season on November 6.

=== Sugar Land Skeeters ===
On June 1, 2018, Adams signed with the Sugar Land Skeeters of the Atlantic League of Professional Baseball.

=== Minnesota Twins ===
On August 19, 2018, Adams's contract was purchased by the Minnesota Twins, and he was assigned to the Double-A Chattanooga Lookouts. He opened the 2019 season with the Rochester Red Wings. On May 16, his contract was selected and he was called up to the major league roster. he made his Twins debut on May 18 and pitched 2 scoreless innings.

=== Detroit Tigers ===
On May 26, 2019, the Detroit Tigers claimed Adams off waivers after the Twins designated him for assignment. He made his Tigers debut on June 1. On July 7, he was designated for assignment. He appeared in 13 games, pitching to a 5.14 ERA. He elected free agency on September 30.

=== Minnesota Twins (second stint) ===
On January 28, 2020, Adams signed a minor league contract with the Minnesota Twins organization. Adams did not play in a game in 2020 due to the cancellation of the minor league season because of the COVID-19 pandemic. On November 2, he elected free agency.

=== Lexington Legends ===
On July 5, 2021, Adams signed with the Lexington Legends of the Atlantic League of Professional Baseball. Adams made 36 appearances for Lexington in 2021, posting a 4–4 record and 2.68 ERA with 8 saves and 36 strikeouts in 37 innings pitched. Adams struggled in 2022, pitching to a 5.46 ERA while collecting 14 saves and 40 strikeouts in 31 1/3 innings of work. He was released by the Legends on August 2, 2022.
