= Toru Murata =

Japanese baseball player (born 1985)

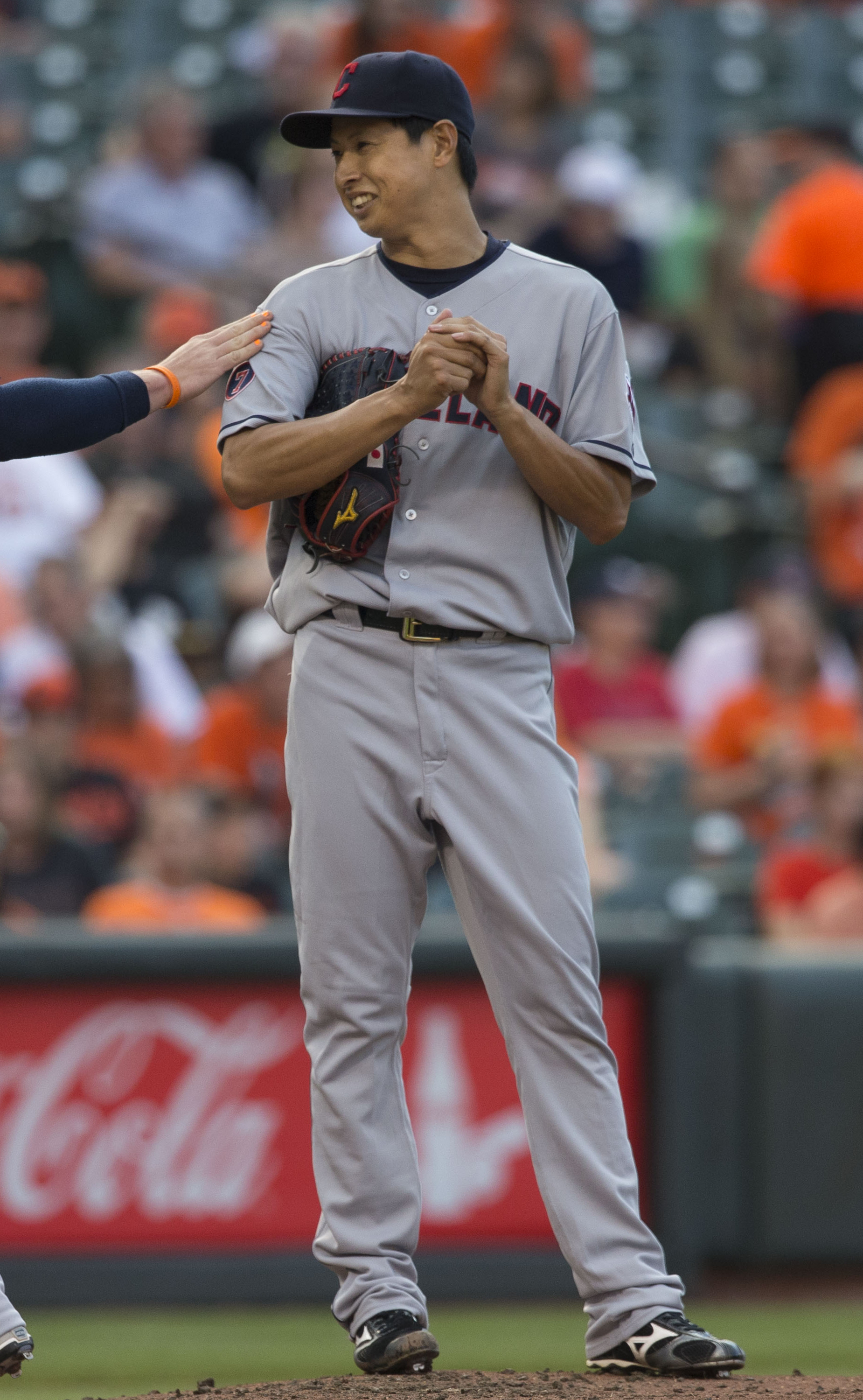
- Murata with the Cleveland Indians
- Pitcher
- Born: May 20, 1985 (age 41); Kumatori, Osaka, Japan
- Batted: Left Threw: Right

Professional debut
- MLB: June 28, 2015, for the Cleveland Indians
- NPB: April 2, 2017, for the Hokkaido Nippon-Ham Fighters

Last appearance
- MLB: June 28, 2015, for the Cleveland Indians
- NPB: August 2, 2021, for the Hokkaido Nippon-Ham Fighters

NPB statistics
- Win–loss record: 8-8
- Earned run average: 3.18
- Strikeouts: 130

MLB statistics
- Win–loss record: 0–1
- Earned run average: 8.10
- Strikeouts: 2
- Stats at Baseball Reference

Teams
- Cleveland Indians (2015); Hokkaido Nippon-Ham Fighters (2017–2021)

Toru Murata (村田 透, Murata Tōru; born May 20, 1985) is a Japanese former professional baseball pitcher. He has previously played in Nippon Professional Baseball (NPB) for the Yomiuri Giants and Hokkaido Nippon-Ham Fighters, and in Major League Baseball (MLB) for the Cleveland Indians.

== Career ==
=== Yomiuri Giants ===
Murata attended Osaka Taiiku University. In 2007, he was selected by the Yomiuri Giants of Nippon Professional Baseball in the first round of the Japanese Draft and spent three years pitching in ni-gun—the Japanese minor league—before being released.

=== Cleveland Indians ===
Murata joined the Cleveland Indians on December 19, 2010, though his American career began before that—he pitched nine games for the Scottsdale Scorpions of the Arizona Fall League in 2009 and was named a "Rising Star." In 2011, he made his professional debut, going 3–2 with 58 strikeouts, 37 hits, 10 walks and a 2.36 ERA in 49 2/3 innings for the High-A Kinston Indians. Between the High-A Carolina Mudcats, Double-A Akron Aeros and Triple-A Columbus Clippers in 2012, the hurler was 3–2 with a 2.89 ERA in 27 games (10 starts). In 74 2/3 innings, he allowed only 68 hits and 22 walks while striking out 66 batters. With Akron and Columbus in 2013, Murata was 6–9 with a 4.44 ERA in 28 starts. In 158 innings, he walked only 29 batters. In 2014, he was 10–7 with a 5.04 ERA in 27 games (20 starts) between Akron and Columbus. He allowed only 38 walks in 126 2/3 innings.

Murata also played professionally in Panama and Venezuela. He throws two fastballs, a cutter, a forkball, a slider, a curveball and changeup. Murata was called up to the major leagues for the first time in his career on June 28, 2015, to start against the Baltimore Orioles as the 26th man on the roster for a doubleheader. After pitching in that one game, he was returned to Triple-A Columbus. On July 31, Murata was outrighted off of the 40-man roster. He finished the year in Columbus, posting a 15–4 record and 2.90 ERA in 27 appearances. He returned to Columbus in 2016, where he logged a 9–4 record and 3.78 ERA with 62 strikeouts in 102.1 innings of work. On November 18, 2016, he was released by the organization so he could return to Japan.

=== Hokkaido Nippon-Ham Fighters ===
On November 18, 2016, Murata signed with the Hokkaido Nippon-Ham Fighters and returned to Nippon Professional Baseball. For the 2017 season, Murata logged a 1–2 record and 2.77 ERA in 15 appearances. The next year, Murata pitched to a 6–3 record and 3.27 ERA with 45 strikeouts in 77.0 innings of work. In 2019, Murata pitched in 13 games for the Fighters, recording a 3.18 ERA with 28 strikeouts.

In 2020, Murata logged a 3.55 ERA with 23 strikeouts in 38.0 innings pitched across 21 appearances. On December 2, 2020, he became a free agent. On December 24, Murata re-signed with the Fighters. In 8 appearances with the main team in 2021, Murata struggled to a 9.31 ERA with 5 strikeouts in 9 2/3 innings pitched. He was released by Nippon–Ham on November 2, 2021.

=== Bonn Capitals ===
On June 9, 2023, Murata signed with the Bonn Capitals of the German Baseball Bundesliga.

=== Hroši Brno ===
On March 6, 2024, Murata signed with the Hroši Brno of the Czech Baseball Extraliga.
