= 2015 Detroit Tigers season =

Major League Baseball season

2015 Detroit Tigers
- League: American League
- Division: Central
- Ballpark: Comerica Park
- City: Detroit, Michigan
- Record: 74–87 (.460)
- Divisional place: 5th
- Owners: Mike Ilitch
- General managers: Al Avila; Dave Dombrowski (released August 4)
- Managers: Brad Ausmus
- Television: Fox Sports Detroit (Mario Impemba, Rod Allen, Jack Morris, Kirk Gibson)
- Radio: Detroit Tigers Radio Network (Dan Dickerson, Jim Price)
- Stats: ESPN.com; Baseball Reference

The 2015 Detroit Tigers season was the team's 115th season, and their 16th season at Comerica Park. This season saw the release of president and general manager Dave Dombrowski, who had been with the team since 2002. In a season plagued by injuries to star players Justin Verlander, Víctor Martínez, Miguel Cabrera, José Iglesias, and Aníbal Sánchez, the Tigers finished in last place in their division with a 74–87 record, had their first losing season since 2008, and failed to make the playoffs for the first time since 2010.

== Roster moves ==
=== Front office ===
- On August 4, the Tigers released team president and general manager Dave Dombrowski and promoted assistant general manager Al Avila to the role of executive vice president of baseball operations and general manager take his place.

=== Coaching staff ===
- On November 2, the Tigers announced that former shortstop and Manager Alan Trammell will return to the organization as a special assistant to General Manager Dave Dombrowski.
- On November 10, the Tigers announced the hiring of David Newhan as assistant hitting coach.

=== Signings ===
- On October 31, the Tigers picked up the $7 million contract option for relief pitcher Joakim Soria.
- On November 14, the Tigers signed designated hitter Víctor Martínez to a four-year, $68 million contract extension.
- On November 14, the Tigers signed relief pitcher Joel Hanrahan to a minor league contract.
- On November 17, the Tigers picked up the $5.4 million contract option for catcher Alex Avila.
- On November 20, the Tigers claimed relief pitcher Josh Zeid off waivers from the Houston Astros.
- On November 21, the Tigers signed outfielder Xavier Avery to a minor league contract.
- On January 5, the Tigers signed first baseman Jordan Lennerton to a minor league contract.
- On January 6, the Tigers signed relief pitcher Tom Gorzelanny to a one-year, $1 million contract, and designated relief pitcher Luke Putkonen for assignment.
- On January 12, the Tigers signed infielder Josh Wilson to a minor league contract.
- On January 14, the Tigers signed relief pitcher Daniel Schlereth to a minor league contract.
- On January 16, the Tigers avoided arbitration when they reached one-year deals with pitchers David Price and Alfredo Simón, and outfielder J. D. Martinez. Price received a $19.75 million salary for 2015, setting a record for the largest one-year deal for an arbitration-eligible player.
- On January 24, the Tigers avoided arbitration with pitcher Al Alburquerque, agreeing on a one-year contract worth $1.725 million.
- On February 21, the Tigers signed outfielder Casper Wells to a minor league contract.
- On February 24, the Tigers re-signed relief pitcher Joba Chamberlain to a one-year, $1 million contract.
- On February 27, the Tigers signed relief pitcher Ryan Perry to a minor league contract.
- On April 23, the Tigers re-signed relief pitcher Luke Putkonen to a minor league contract.

=== Releases ===
- On October 31, outfielder Andy Dirks was claimed off waivers by the Toronto Blue Jays, and relief pitcher Pat McCoy was claimed off waivers by the Baltimore Orioles.
- Also on October 31, utility man Don Kelly and relief pitcher Evan Reed were outrighted to the Triple-A Toledo Mud Hens. They both declined their minor league assignments, and elected to become free agents.
- On November 20, center fielder Ezequiel Carrera was outrighted to Triple-A Toledo. He declined his minor league assignment, and elected to become a free agent on November 25. On December 3, Carerra signed a minor-league contract with the Toronto Blue Jays.
- On December 3, free agent outfielder Torii Hunter left the Tigers and signed a one-year contract with the Minnesota Twins.
- Also on December 3, free agent relief pitcher Jim Johnson left the Tigers and signed a one-year contract with the Atlanta Braves.
- On January 21, free agent pitcher Max Scherzer left the Tigers and signed a seven-year, $210 million contract with the Washington Nationals.
- On February 24, relief pitcher Chad Smith was designated for assignment by the Tigers and claimed off waivers by the Oakland Athletics two days later.
- On March 4, the Tigers released relief pitcher Joel Hanrahan.

=== Trades ===
- On November 12, the Tigers traded second baseman Devon Travis to the Toronto Blue Jays for outfielder Anthony Gose.
- On December 5, the Tigers traded pitcher Robbie Ray and infielder Domingo Leyba to the Arizona Diamondbacks in a three team trade that brought Shane Greene to the Detroit Tigers, and Didi Gregorius to the New York Yankees.
- On December 11, the Tigers traded starting pitcher Rick Porcello to the Boston Red Sox for outfielder Yoenis Céspedes, and pitchers Alex Wilson and Gabe Speier.
- Also on December 11, the Tigers traded shortstop Eugenio Suárez and pitcher Jonathon Crawford to the Cincinnati Reds for pitcher Alfredo Simón.
- On July 30, the Tigers traded starting pitcher David Price to the Toronto Blue Jays for pitchers Daniel Norris, Matt Boyd and Jairo Labourt.
- Also on July 30, the Tigers traded relief pitcher Joakim Soria to the Pittsburgh Pirates for shortstop JaCoby Jones.
- On July 31, the Tigers traded outfielder Yoenis Céspedes to the New York Mets for pitchers Michael Fulmer and Luis Cessa.
- On August 20, the Tigers acquired pitcher Randy Wolf from the Toronto Blue Jays for cash considerations.

== Season highlights ==
=== Individual accomplishments ===
==== Hitting ====
- On April 8, Anthony Gose fell a home run shy of the cycle, hitting a single, double, and triple, to help the Tigers defeat the Minnesota Twins, 11–0.
- On April 8, Alex Avila became the first Tigers catcher to score four runs in a game since Brad Ausmus in 2000.
- Miguel Cabrera went 11-for-13 over a three-game series against the Cleveland Indians, this was the best three-game stretch by a Tigers hitter since Walt Dropo went 13-for-14 in 1952.
- On April 29, James McCann became the first Tigers player to hit an inside-the-park home run since Austin Jackson on August 10, 2012.
- On May 16, Miguel Cabrera hit his 400th career home run, against Tyler Lyons of the St. Louis Cardinals.
- On May 21, Miguel Cabrera recorded his 1,400th career RBI, becoming the fifth-youngest in MLB history to reach the milestone.
- On May 21, James McCann became the first MLB player to hit an inside-the-park home run and a walk-off home run for his first two career home runs since Tim Raines in 1981.
- On June 21, J. D. Martinez became the first Tigers player to hit three home runs and have six RBIs in a game since Carlos Peña on May 19, 2003. Martinez became the fifth player in Major League history to hit three home runs and drive in six runs on the road against the New York Yankees since RBIs became an official stat in 1920, and the first player to do so since Bo Jackson in 1990.
- On June 28, James McCann became the first MLB player to hit an inside-the-park home run and two walk-off home runs for his first three career home runs since Tony Piet in 1932.
- On June 30, J. D. Martinez hit his 11th home run in the month of June, tied for third most in franchise history, and the most since Mickey Tettleton in 1993.
- On August 16, Miguel Cabrera recorded his 1,426th career RBI to surpass Andrés Galarraga for the most RBIs by a Venezuelan-born player.
- On August 19, Daniel Norris became the first Tigers pitcher to hit a home run in his first career plate appearance, the first pitcher to do so since Tommy Milone in 2011, the first American League pitcher since Esteban Yan in 2000, and the 19th pitcher overall to do so. He also became the first Tigers pitcher to homer since Jason Johnson did so on June 8, 2005, the first Tigers player of any kind to hit a home run in his first career plate appearance since Reggie Sanders in 1974, and the first American League pitcher to hit a regular-season home run at Wrigley Field.
- On August 19, Nick Castellanos became the first Tigers player to have four extra base hits in a game since Iván Rodríguez on April 5, 2006.
- On September 10, Ian Kinsler recorded his 1,500th career hit, a single off of Bryan Shaw of the Cleveland Indians.
- On September 23, Víctor Martínez hit his 200th career home run, against Frankie Montas of the Chicago White Sox, becoming the sixth Venezuelan to reach the milestone.
- On September 29, J. D. Martinez recorded his 100th RBI of the season, becoming the first Tigers outfielder to do so since Magglio Ordóñez recorded 103 in 2008.
- Miguel Cabrera led the major leagues with a .338 batting average to win his fourth AL batting title in the last five years.
- Miguel Cabrera and J. D. Martinez won Silver Slugger Awards, their sixth and first respectively.

==== Pitching ====
- On April 14, Shane Greene became the first Tigers pitcher to pitch eight innings or more without an earned run in consecutive starts to begin the season since Bob Sykes in 1978.
- On April 19, Shane Greene became the first Tigers pitcher to pitch at least seven innings and allow one run or fewer in each of his first three starts since Jack Morris in 1984.
- On April 25, Alfredo Simón became the first Tigers pitcher to win his first four starts in a season since Frank Tanana in 1988.
- On June 12, David Price became the first Tigers pitcher to pitch a complete game shutout in 93 pitches or fewer since Armando Galarraga's near-perfect game on June 2, 2010. Price became just the fifth Tigers pitcher in the last 15 years to throw back-to-back complete games, following Rick Porcello, Justin Verlander, Mark Redman and Steve Sparks.
- On June 12, David Price became just the second Tigers pitcher since 1983 to induce four double plays in a game, and the first since Jeremy Bonderman in 2007.
- On August 20, Alfredo Simón recorded his first career complete game shutout in the Tigers 4–0 win over the Texas Rangers. He allowed only one hit in the game, a double to Rougned Odor in the fifth inning, while walking two and striking out five.
- On August 23, Blaine Hardy's homerless streak of 84 2/3 innings ended after allowing a home run to Mike Napoli. This was the longest active homerless innings streak in the major leagues. The last time Hardy had allowed a home run was to Jason Castro on June 27, 2014. Hardy holds the franchise record for the most appearances by a left-hander without allowing a home run, at 87, and was two appearances away from tying Bernie Boland's record for 89 homerless games. Boland's streak lasted from 1915 to 1920, and covered 198 2/3 innings.
- On August 26, Justin Verlander came within three outs of his third career no-hitter against the Los Angeles Angels of Anaheim, before allowing a double to Chris Iannetta. This was his seventh career complete game shutout, and second career complete game one-hitter. This marked the seventh time in the last five seasons Verlander carried a no-hit bid into at least the seventh inning, two more than any other pitcher in baseball.

==== Defensive ====
- James McCann set the modern major league record for the number of consecutive games played at catcher to start a career without an error, at 102 games, surpassing the previous record of 93 set by Frankie Pytlak from 1932 to 1934.
- James McCann finished the season with no errors in 112 games to lead all MLB catchers in fielding percentage. He became the sixth catcher in major league history to catch at least 100 games in a season without committing an error, following Chris Iannetta and Chris Snyder in 2008, Mike Matheny in 2003, Charles Johnson in 1997 and Buddy Rosar in 1946.
- Ian Kinsler won the Fielding Bible Award for second base. His 19 defensive runs saved were six better than any other Major League second baseman, while his 6.3 ultimate zone rating was the best in the American League.
- Yoenis Céspedes won the American League Rawlings Gold Glove Award in left field. In 99 games for the Tigers, Céspedes had nine assists, 11 defensive runs saved and a 15 ultimate zone rating.

=== Team accomplishments ===
- The Tigers opened the regular season with consecutive shutout wins for the first time in franchise history. They became the 14th team in the last 100 years to do so, and the first American League team to do so since the 1977 California Angels.
- The Tigers extended their shutout streak by six innings, before allowing an unearned run. The Tigers set a modern-day American League record for shutout innings to begin a season at 24 innings, surpassing the previous record of 22 innings set by the 1947 Chicago White Sox. The Tigers' 24-inning scoreless streak to begin the season is the third-longest streak in Major League history.
- The Tigers went 32 innings to start the season before allowing an earned run, tying the modern day Major League record set by the 1963 St. Louis Cardinals.
- The Tigers became the third team in Major League history to score at least 30 runs in their first four games while allowing five or fewer, the other teams being the 2007 New York Mets and the 1888 Brooklyn Bridegrooms.
- On April 12, the Tigers recorded their sixth consecutive game with at least 10 hits, setting a franchise record. This is the longest streak in the Major Leagues since the 1999 Cleveland Indians had at least 10 hits in 10 consecutive games.
- The Tigers' 6–0 record to begin the season is their best start since 1985, and is tied for the second-best start to a season in franchise history.
- The Tigers went 30 2/3 innings without allowing a walk, from the eighth inning on April 12 against the Cleveland Indians until the second inning on April 17 against the Chicago White Sox. This was their longest stretch without allowing a walk since 1914.
- On August 19, the Tigers compiled at least 19 hits in consecutive games for the fourth time in franchise history, and the first time since June 30, 1935.
- On September 22, the Tigers came within two outs of a combined no-hitter against the Chicago White Sox, before allowing a triple to Tyler Saladino.

=== All-Stars ===
The Tigers sent four players to the 2015 All-Star Game. First baseman Miguel Cabrera was voted in as the starter at first base in the fan voting, while shortstop José Iglesias, outfielder J. D. Martinez and pitcher David Price were selected as reserves in the player voting. Cabrera did not participate in the All-Star game due to a left calf strain. The Tigers had a chance to send a fifth player to the All-Star Game this season, as outfielder Yoenis Céspedes was one of the five finalists for the AL in the All-Star Final Vote, but he was beaten out by Mike Moustakas of the Kansas City Royals.

Price became the winning pitcher of the game, marking the second consecutive All-Star game that featured a Tiger as the winning pitcher, following Max Scherzer who won in 2014.

== Standings ==
=== American League Central ===
AL Central
| Team | W | L | Pct. | GB | Home | Road |
|---|---|---|---|---|---|---|
| Kansas City Royals | 95 | 67 | .586 | — | 51‍–‍30 | 44‍–‍37 |
| Minnesota Twins | 83 | 79 | .512 | 12 | 46‍–‍35 | 37‍–‍44 |
| Cleveland Indians | 81 | 80 | .503 | 13½ | 39‍–‍41 | 42‍–‍39 |
| Chicago White Sox | 76 | 86 | .469 | 19 | 40‍–‍41 | 36‍–‍45 |
| Detroit Tigers | 74 | 87 | .460 | 20½ | 38‍–‍43 | 36‍–‍44 |

=== Record against opponents ===
2015 American League record Source: MLB Standings Grid – 2015
| Team | BAL | BOS | CWS | CLE | DET | HOU | KC | LAA | MIN | NYY | OAK | SEA | TB | TEX | TOR | NL |
|---|---|---|---|---|---|---|---|---|---|---|---|---|---|---|---|---|
| Baltimore | — | 11–8 | 3–3 | 5–1 | 4–3 | 3–4 | 3–4 | 2–4 | 0–7 | 10–9 | 6–1 | 3–3 | 10–9 | 1–6 | 8–11 | 12–8 |
| Boston | 8–11 | — | 3–4 | 2–4 | 4–2 | 2–4 | 4–3 | 2–5 | 2–5 | 8–11 | 5–1 | 4–3 | 9–10 | 2–5 | 10–9 | 13–7 |
| Chicago | 3–3 | 4–3 | — | 10–9 | 9–10 | 5–1 | 7–12 | 4–3 | 6–13 | 2–5 | 5–2 | 4–3 | 1–5 | 3–3 | 4–3 | 9–11 |
| Cleveland | 1–5 | 4–2 | 9–10 | — | 7–11 | 5–2 | 9–10 | 4–2 | 7–12 | 5–2 | 3–4 | 4–3 | 5–2 | 3–3 | 3–4 | 12–8 |
| Detroit | 3–4 | 2–4 | 10–9 | 11–7 | — | 3–4 | 9–10 | 1–6 | 11–8 | 2–5 | 2–4 | 4–3 | 3–3 | 2–5 | 2–4 | 9–11 |
| Houston | 4–3 | 4–2 | 1–5 | 2–5 | 4–3 | — | 4–2 | 10–9 | 3–3 | 4–3 | 10–9 | 12–7 | 2–5 | 6–13 | 4–3 | 16–4 |
| Kansas City | 4–3 | 3–4 | 12–7 | 10–9 | 10–9 | 2–4 | — | 6–1 | 12–7 | 2–4 | 5–1 | 4–2 | 6–1 | 3–4 | 3–4 | 13–7 |
| Los Angeles | 4–2 | 5–2 | 3–4 | 2–4 | 6–1 | 9–10 | 1–6 | — | 5–2 | 2–4 | 11–8 | 12–7 | 3–3 | 12–7 | 2–5 | 8–12 |
| Minnesota | 7–0 | 5–2 | 13–6 | 12–7 | 8–11 | 3–3 | 7–12 | 2–5 | — | 1–5 | 4–3 | 4–3 | 4–2 | 3–3 | 2–5 | 8–12 |
| New York | 9–10 | 11–8 | 5–2 | 2–5 | 5–2 | 3–4 | 4–2 | 4–2 | 5–1 | — | 3–4 | 5–1 | 12–7 | 2–5 | 6–13 | 11–9 |
| Oakland | 1–6 | 1–5 | 2–5 | 4–3 | 4–2 | 9–10 | 1–5 | 8–11 | 3–4 | 4–3 | — | 6–13 | 3–4 | 10–9 | 1–5 | 11–9 |
| Seattle | 3–3 | 3–4 | 3–4 | 3–4 | 3–4 | 7–12 | 2–4 | 7–12 | 3–4 | 1–5 | 13–6 | — | 4–3 | 12–7 | 4–2 | 8–12 |
| Tampa Bay | 9–10 | 10–9 | 5–1 | 2–5 | 3–3 | 5–2 | 1–6 | 3–3 | 2–4 | 7–12 | 4–3 | 3–4 | — | 2–5 | 10–9 | 14–6 |
| Texas | 6–1 | 5–2 | 3–3 | 3–3 | 5–2 | 13–6 | 4–3 | 7–12 | 3–3 | 5–2 | 9–10 | 7–12 | 5–2 | — | 2–4 | 11–9 |
| Toronto | 11–8 | 9–10 | 3–4 | 4–3 | 4–2 | 3–4 | 4–3 | 5–2 | 5–2 | 13–6 | 5–1 | 2–4 | 9–10 | 4–2 | — | 12–8 |

== Game log ==
Legend
| Tigers win | Tigers loss | Game postponed |

2015 Game Log (74–87)
April (15–8)

| # | Date | Opponent | Score | Win | Loss | Save | Attendance | Record |
|---|---|---|---|---|---|---|---|---|
| 1 | April 6 | Twins | W 4–0 | Price (1–0) | Hughes (0–1) | Nathan (1) | 45,030 | 1–0 |
| 2 | April 8 | Twins | W 11–0 | Sánchez (1–0) | Nolasco (0–1) | — | 28,280 | 2–0 |
| 3 | April 9 | Twins | W 7–1 | Greene (1–0) | Gibson (0–1) | — | 26,782 | 3–0 |
| 4 | April 10 | @ Indians | W 8–4 | Simón (1–0) | McAllister (0–1) | Soria (1) | 35,789 | 4–0 |
| 5 | April 11 | @ Indians | W 9–6 | Krol (1–0) | Allen (0–1) | — | 23,161 | 5–0 |
| 6 | April 12 | @ Indians | W 8–5 | Lobstein (1–0) | House (0–1) | Soria (2) | 19,555 | 6–0 |
| 7 | April 13 | @ Pirates | L 4–5 | Cole (1–0) | Sánchez (1–1) | — | 39,933 | 6–1 |
| 8 | April 14 | @ Pirates | W 2–0 | Greene (2–0) | Burnett (0–1) | Soria (3) | 31,755 | 7–1 |
| 9 | April 15 | @ Pirates | W 1–0 | Simón (2–0) | Liriano (0–1) | Soria (4) | 19,509 | 8–1 |
| 10 | April 17 | White Sox | W 2–1 | Soria (1–0) | Duke (1–1) | — | 33,084 | 9–1 |
| 11 | April 18 | White Sox | L 3–12 | Sale (2–0) | Sánchez (1–2) | — | 39,877 | 9–2 |
| 12 | April 19 | White Sox | W 9–1 | Greene (3–0) | Quintana (1–1) | — | 30,357 | 10–2 |
| 13 | April 20 | Yankees | W 2–1 | Simón (3–0) | Sabathia (0–3) | Soria (5) | 27,540 | 11–2 |
| 14 | April 21 | Yankees | L 2–5 | Eovaldi (1–0) | Lobstein (1–1) | Miller (5) | 27,031 | 11–3 |
| 15 | April 22 | Yankees | L 4–13 | Warren (1–1) | Price (1–1) | — | 27,389 | 11–4 |
| 16 | April 23 | Yankees | L 1–2 | Betances (3–0) | Gorzelanny (0–1) | Miller (6) | 27,754 | 11–5 |
| 17 | April 24 | Indians | L 1–13 | Salazar (2–0) | Greene (3–1) | — | 28,192 | 11–6 |
| 18 | April 25 | Indians | W 4–1 | Simón (4–0) | House (0–3) | Soria (6) | 35,473 | 12–6 |
| 19 | April 26 | Indians | W 8–6 | Lobstein (2–1) | Carrasco (2–2) | Soria (7) | 30,698 | 13–6 |
| 20 | April 27 | @ Twins | W 5–4 | Price (2–1) | Milone (2–1) | Soria (8) | 18,054 | 14–6 |
| 21 | April 28 | @ Twins | L 2–3 | Pelfrey (2–0) | Sánchez (1–3) | Perkins (6) | 18,169 | 14–7 |
| 22 | April 29 | @ Twins | W 10–7 | Gorzelanny (1–1) | Fien (1–2) | Soria (9) | 19,447 | 15–7 |
| 23 | April 30 | @ Royals | L 1–8 | Duffy (2–0) | Simón (4–1) | — | 28,405 | 15–8 |

May (13–16)

| # | Date | Opponent | Score | Win | Loss | Save | Attendance | Record |
|---|---|---|---|---|---|---|---|---|
| 24 | May 1 | @ Royals | L 1–4 | Young (2–0) | Lobstein (2–2) | Davis (5) | 38,186 | 15–9 |
| 25 | May 2 | @ Royals | W 2–1 | Price (3–1) | Vólquez (2–3) | — | 38,692 | 16–9 |
| 26 | May 3 | @ Royals | W 6–4 | Sánchez (2–3) | Guthrie (1–2) | Soria (10) | 38,326 | 17–9 |
| 27 | May 5 | @ White Sox | L 2–5 | Samardzija (2–2) | Greene (3–2) | Robertson (4) | 16,351 | 17–10 |
| 28 | May 6 | @ White Sox | L 6–7 | Putnam (1–1) | Chamberlain (0–1) | Robertson (5) | 18,268 | 17–11 |
| 29 | May 7 | @ White Sox | W 4–1 | Lobstein (3–2) | Quintana (1–3) | Soria (11) | 20,081 | 18–11 |
| 30 | May 8 | Royals | W 6–5 | Soria (2–0) | Pino (0–1) | — | 39,434 | 19–11 |
| 31 | May 9 | Royals | L 2–6 | Guthrie (2–2) | Sánchez (2–4) | — | 41,456 | 19–12 |
| 32 | May 10 | Royals | L 1–2 (10) | Frasor (1–0) | Nesbitt (0–1) | Holland (6) | 29,852 | 19–13 |
| 33 | May 12 | Twins | W 2–1 (10) | Nesbitt (1–1) | Pressly (1–1) | — | 26,177 | 20–13 |
| 34 | May 13 | Twins | L 2–6 | Nolasco (3–1) | Lobstein (3–3) | — | 27,163 | 20–14 |
| 35 | May 14 | Twins | W 13–1 | Sánchez (3–4) | Pelfrey (3–1) | — | 31,785 | 21–14 |
| 36 | May 15 | @ Cardinals | W 10–4 | Greene (4–2) | Martínez (3–2) | — | 45,601 | 22–14 |
| 37 | May 16 | @ Cardinals | W 4–3 (10) | Hardy (1–0) | Belisle (1–1) | Soria (12) | 45,313 | 23–14 |
| 38 | May 17 | @ Cardinals | L 1–2 | Lynn (3–3) | Simón (4–2) | Rosenthal (13) | 43,654 | 23–15 |
| 39 | May 18 | Brewers | L 2–3 | Jeffress (1–0) | Lobstein (3–4) | Rodríguez (8) | 26,016 | 23–16 |
| 40 | May 19 | Brewers | L 1–8 | Nelson (2–4) | Sánchez (3–5) | — | 26,984 | 23–17 |
| 41 | May 20 | Brewers | W 5–2 | Hardy (2–0) | Broxton (1–1) | Soria (13) | 27,716 | 24–17 |
| 42 | May 21 | Astros | W 6–5 (11) | Wilson (1–0) | Sipp (2–1) | — | 33,193 | 25–17 |
| 43 | May 22 | Astros | W 6–2 | Simón (5–2) | McHugh (5–2) | — | 37,276 | 26–17 |
| 44 | May 23 | Astros | L 2–3 | McCullers (1–0) | Lobstein (3–5) | Gregerson (11) | 40,153 | 26–18 |
| 45 | May 24 | Astros | L 8–10 | Thatcher (1–1) | Wilson (1–1) | Gregerson (12) | 36,449 | 26–19 |
| 46 | May 25 | @ Athletics | L 0–4 | Hahn (2–4) | Greene (4–3) | — | 25,380 | 26–20 |
| 47 | May 26 | @ Athletics | W 1–0 | Price (4–1) | Chavez (1–5) | Soria (14) | 22,758 | 27–20 |
| 48 | May 27 | @ Athletics | W 3–2 | Ryan (1–0) | Otero (2–3) | Soria (15) | 20,387 | 28–20 |
| 49 | May 28 | @ Angels | L 2–12 | Wilson (3–3) | Farmer (0–1) | — | 32,261 | 28–21 |
| 50 | May 29 | @ Angels | L 0–2 | Santiago (4–3) | Sánchez (3–6) | Street (15) | 41,901 | 28–22 |
| 51 | May 30 | @ Angels | L 6–8 | Weaver (4–4) | Greene (4–4) | Street (16) | 40,369 | 28–23 |
| 52 | May 31 | @ Angels | L 2–4 | Smith (2–2) | Price (4–2) | Street (17) | 37,143 | 28–24 |

June (11–13)

| # | Date | Opponent | Score | Win | Loss | Save | Attendance | Record |
|---|---|---|---|---|---|---|---|---|
| 53 | June 2 | Athletics | L 3–5 | Graveman (3–2) | Simón (5–3) | Clippard (8) | 28,362 | 28–25 |
| 54 | June 3 | Athletics | L 1–6 | Gray (7–2) | Sánchez (3–7) | — | 30,718 | 28–26 |
| 55 | June 4 | Athletics | L 5–7 | Hahn (3–5) | Greene (4–5) | Clippard (9) | 37,411 | 28–27 |
| 56 | June 5 | @ White Sox | L 3–4 (11) | Petricka (1–1) | Wilson (1–2) | — | 24,761 | 28–28 |
| 57 | June 6 | @ White Sox | W 7–1 | Price (5–2) | Danks (3–5) | — | 28,368 | 29–28 |
| 58 | June 7 | @ White Sox | W 6–4 | Simón (6–3) | Samardzija (4–4) | Soria (16) | 29,059 | 30–28 |
| 59 | June 9 | Cubs | W 6–0 | Sánchez (4–7) | Lester (4–5) | — | 33,301 | 31–28 |
| 60 | June 10 | Cubs | L 3–12 | Arrieta (6–4) | Greene (4–6) | — | 33,397 | 31–29 |
| 61 | June 12 | Indians | W 4–0 | Price (6–2) | Salazar (6–2) | — | 35,379 | 32–29 |
| 62 | June 13 | Indians | L 4–5 | Carrasco (8–5) | Hardy (2–1) | Allen (14) | 41,620 | 32–30 |
| 63 | June 14 | Indians | W 8–1 | Simón (7–3) | Kluber (3–8) | — | 36,994 | 33–30 |
| 64 | June 15 | Reds | W 6–0 | Sánchez (5–7) | Villarreal (0–1) | — | 29,884 | 34–30 |
| 65 | June 16 | Reds | L 2–5 | Lorenzen (2–2) | Ryan (1–1) | Chapman (14) | 33,774 | 34–31 |
| 66 | June 17 | @ Reds | L 4–8 (13) | Badenhop (1–2) | Krol (1–1) | — | 32,546 | 34–32 |
| — | June 18 | @ Reds | Postponed (rain). Rescheduled to August 24. | | | | | |
| 67 | June 19 | @ Yankees | L 2–7 | Warren (5–4) | Verlander (0–1) | — | 44,588 | 34–33 |
| 68 | June 20 | @ Yankees | L 3–14 | Eovaldi (6–2) | Simón (7–4) | Mitchell (1) | 48,092 | 34–34 |
| 69 | June 21 | @ Yankees | W 12–4 | Sánchez (6–7) | Tanaka (4–3) | — | 38,691 | 35–34 |
| 70 | June 22 | @ Indians | W 8–5 | Hardy (3–1) | Bauer (6–4) | — | 15,746 | 36–34 |
| 71 | June 23 | @ Indians | W 7–3 | Price (7–2) | Salazar (6–3) | — | 19,156 | 37–34 |
| 72 | June 24 | @ Indians | L 2–8 | Carrasco (9–6) | Farmer (0–2) | — | 20,780 | 37–35 |
| 73 | June 25 | White Sox | L 7–8 (10) | Duke (3–2) | Chamberlain (0–2) | Robertson (15) | 40,355 | 37–36 |
| 74 | June 26 | White Sox | W 5–4 | Rondón (1–0) | Duke (3–3) | Soria (17) | 38,455 | 38–36 |
| — | June 27 | White Sox | Postponed (rain). Rescheduled to September 21. | | | | | |
| 75 | June 28 | White Sox | W 5–4 | Soria (3–0) | Putnam (1–3) | — | 39,455 | 39–36 |
| 76 | June 30 | Pirates | L 4–5 (14) | Guerra (1–0) | Gorzelanny (1–2) | — | 33,899 | 39–37 |

July (11–16)

| # | Date | Opponent | Score | Win | Loss | Save | Attendance | Record |
|---|---|---|---|---|---|---|---|---|
| 77 | July 1 | Pirates | L 3–9 | Burnett (7–3) | Simón (7–5) | — | 31,351 | 39–38 |
| 78 | July 2 | Pirates | L 4–8 | Liriano (5–6) | Ryan (1–2) | Melancon (25) | 34,680 | 39–39 |
| 79 | July 3 | Blue Jays | W 8–6 | Sánchez (7–7) | Hutchison (8–2) | Soria (18) | 39,367 | 40–39 |
| 80 | July 4 | Blue Jays | W 8–3 | Price (8–2) | Dickey (3–9) | — | 37,214 | 41–39 |
| 81 | July 5 | Blue Jays | L 5–10 | Estrada (6–4) | Verlander (0–2) | Osuna (3) | 35,102 | 41–40 |
| 82 | July 6 | @ Mariners | W 12–5 | Simón (8–5) | Guaipe (0–1) | — | 22,580 | 42–40 |
| 83 | July 7 | @ Mariners | L 6–7 (11) | Furbush (1–1) | Krol (1–2) | — | 21,782 | 42–41 |
| 84 | July 8 | @ Mariners | W 5–4 | Sánchez (8–7) | Guaipe (0–2) | Soria (19) | 26,488 | 43–41 |
| 85 | July 9 | @ Twins | W 4–2 | Price (9–2) | Pelfrey (5–6) | Soria (20) | 29,724 | 44–41 |
| 86 | July 10 | @ Twins | L 6–8 | May (6–7) | Soria (3–1) | — | 31,545 | 44–42 |
| 87 | July 11 | @ Twins | L 5–9 | Hughes (8–6) | Simón (8–6) | — | 32,365 | 44–43 |
| 88 | July 12 | @ Twins | L 1–7 | Gibson (8–6) | Greene (4–7) | — | 27,936 | 44–44 |
| 89 | July 17 | Orioles | W 7–3 | Sánchez (9–7) | Jiménez (7–5) | — | 36,378 | 45–44 |
| 90 | July 18 | Orioles | L 0–3 | Tillman (7–7) | Price (9–3) | Britton (24) | 40,033 | 45–45 |
| 91 | July 19 | Orioles | L 3–9 | González (8–6) | Verlander (0–3) | — | 39,978 | 45–46 |
| 92 | July 20 | Mariners | W 5–4 | Alburquerque (1–0) | Lowe (0–1) | Soria (21) | 34,353 | 46–46 |
| 93 | July 21 | Mariners | L 9–11 | Beimel (1–1) | Feliz (1–3) | Smith (8) | 34,088 | 46–47 |
| 94 | July 22 | Mariners | W 9–4 | Sánchez (10–7) | Montgomery (4–4) | Soria (22) | 36,670 | 47–47 |
| 95 | July 23 | Mariners | L 2–3 (12) | Rodney (3–4) | Krol (1–3) | Wilhelmsen (1) | 44,025 | 47–48 |
| 96 | July 24 | @ Red Sox | L 1–2 (11) | Masterson (4–2) | Hardy (3–2) | — | 37,650 | 47–49 |
| 97 | July 25 | @ Red Sox | W 5–1 | Simón (9–6) | Wright (3–4) | — | 37,256 | 48–49 |
| 98 | July 26 | @ Red Sox | L 1–11 | Rodríguez (6–3) | Greene (4–8) | — | 35,582 | 48–50 |
| 99 | July 27 | @ Rays | L 2–5 | Karns (6–5) | Sánchez (10–8) | Boxberger (25) | 13,348 | 48–51 |
| 100 | July 28 | @ Rays | L 2–10 | Odorizzi (6–6) | Price (9–4) | — | 16,326 | 48–52 |
| 101 | July 29 | @ Rays | W 2–1 | Verlander (1–3) | Archer (9–8) | Soria (23) | 28,057 | 49–52 |
| 102 | July 30 | @ Orioles | W 9–8 | Simón (10–6) | González (9–7) | Wilson (1) | 30,136 | 50–52 |
| 103 | July 31 | @ Orioles | L 7–8 | Givens (1–0) | Valdez (0–1) | Britton (27) | 36,985 | 50–53 |

August (10–17)

| # | Date | Opponent | Score | Win | Loss | Save | Attendance | Record |
|---|---|---|---|---|---|---|---|---|
| 104 | August 1 | @ Orioles | L 2–6 | Gausman (2–2) | Sánchez (10–9) | — | 45,968 | 50–54 |
| 105 | August 2 | @ Orioles | W 6–1 | Norris (2–1) | Jiménez (8–7) | — | 33,381 | 51–54 |
| 106 | August 4 | Royals | L 1–5 | Duffy (5–5) | Verlander (1–4) | — | 35,039 | 51–55 |
| 107 | August 5 | Royals | W 2–1 | Boyd (1–2) | Cueto (0–1) | Wilson (2) | 34,628 | 52–55 |
| 108 | August 6 | Royals | W 8–6 | Wilson (2–3) | Madson (1–2) | — | 38,919 | 53–55 |
| 109 | August 7 | Red Sox | L 2–7 | Kelly (4–6) | Norris (2–2) | Uehara (25) | 38,132 | 53–56 |
| 110 | August 8 | Red Sox | W 7–6 | Hardy (4–2) | Tazawa (2–5) | Rondón (1) | 42,098 | 54–56 |
| 111 | August 9 | Red Sox | L 2–7 | Owens (1–1) | Verlander (1–5) | — | 38,766 | 54–57 |
| 112 | August 10 | @ Royals | L 0–4 | Cueto (1–1) | Boyd (1–3) | — | 36,672 | 54–58 |
| 113 | August 11 | @ Royals | L 1–6 | Ventura (7–7) | Sánchez (10–10) | Hochevar (1) | 34,068 | 54–59 |
| 114 | August 12 | @ Royals | W 7–4 | Feliz (2–3) | Vólquez (11–7) | Rondón (2) | 30,732 | 55–59 |
| 115 | August 14 | @ Houston | L 1–5 | Keuchel (14–6) | Simón (10–7) | — | 33,212 | 55–60 |
| 116 | August 15 | @ Houston | W 4–2 (11) | Alburquerque (2–0) | Neshek (3–3) | Feliz (7) | 29,482 | 56–60 |
| 117 | August 16 | @ Houston | L 5–6 | Harris (5–2) | Gorzelanny (1–2) | — | 29,969 | 56–61 |
| 118 | August 18 | @ Cubs | W 10–8 | Alburquerque (3–0) | Strop (1–6) | — | 39,684 | 57–61 |
| 119 | August 19 | @ Cubs | W 15–8 | Feliz (3–3) | Lester (8–9) | — | 40,310 | 58–61 |
| 120 | August 20 | Rangers | W 4–0 | Simón (11–7) | Pérez (1–3) | — | 33,727 | 59–61 |
| 121 | August 21 | Rangers | L 0–2 | Lewis (14–5) | Verlander (1–6) | Tolleson (24) | 34,718 | 59–62 |
| 122 | August 22 | Rangers | L 3–5 | Gallardo (10–9) | Wolf (0–1) | — | 39,082 | 59–63 |
| 123 | August 23 | Rangers | L 2–4 | Hamels (1–1) | Boyd (1–4) | Tolleson (25) | 39,317 | 59–64 |
| 124 | August 24 | @ Reds | L 5–12 | Balester (1–0) | Alburquerque (3–1) | — | 30,150 | 59–65 |
| 125 | August 25 | Angels | L 7–8 | Weaver (6–9) | Simón (11–8) | Street (30) | 33,649 | 59–66 |
| 126 | August 26 | Angels | W 5–0 | Verlander (2–6) | Santiago (7–8) | — | 31,938 | 60–66 |
| 127 | August 27 | Angels | L 0–2 | Shoemaker (6–9) | Wolf (0–2) | Street (31) | 36,198 | 60–67 |
| 128 | August 28 | @ Blue Jays | L 3–5 | Dickey (9–10) | Boyd (1–5) | Osuna (16) | 46,518 | 60–68 |
| 129 | August 29 | @ Blue Jays | L 1–15 | Hutchison (13–2) | Farmer (0–3) | — | 46,444 | 60–69 |
| 130 | August 30 | @ Blue Jays | L 2–9 | Buehrle (14–6) | Simón (11–9) | — | 46,625 | 60–70 |

September (13–15)

| # | Date | Opponent | Score | Win | Loss | Save | Attendance | Record |
|---|---|---|---|---|---|---|---|---|
| 131 | September 1 | @ Royals | W 6–5 | Verlander (3–6) | Cueto (2–4) | Rondón (3) | 30,665 | 61–70 |
| 132 | September 2 | @ Royals | L 1–12 | Ventura (10–7) | Wolf (0–3) | — | 26,789 | 61–71 |
| 133 | September 3 | @ Royals | L 7–15 | Young (10–6) | Ryan (1–3) | — | 29,409 | 61–72 |
| 134 | September 4 | Indians | L 1–8 | Tomlin (4–1) | Lobstein (3–6) | — | 26,378 | 61–73 |
| 135 | September 5 | Indians | W 6–0 | Simón (12–9) | Salazar (12–8) | — | 28,949 | 62–73 |
| 136 | September 6 | Indians | L 0–4 | Anderson (3–3) | Verlander (3–7) | — | 28,964 | 62–74 |
| 137 | September 7 | Rays | W 5–4 | Alburquerque (4–1) | Gomes (2–5) | Rondón (4) | 27,958 | 63–74 |
| 138 | September 8 | Rays | W 8–7 (13) | Ryan (2–3) | Bellatti (2–1) | — | 26,526 | 64–74 |
| 139 | September 9 | Rays | L 0–8 | Odorizzi (7–8) | Lobstein (3–7) | — | 25,932 | 64–75 |
| 140 | September 10 | @ Indians | L 5–7 | Allen (2–4) | Hardy (4–3) | — | 11,166 | 64–76 |
| — | September 11 | @ Indians | Postponed (rain). Rescheduled to September 13. | | | | | |
| — | September 12 | @ Indians | Cancelled (rain) due to the Indians being eliminated from playoff contention. | | | | | |
| 141 | September 13 | @ Indians | L 2–7 | Anderson (4–3) | Verlander (3–8) | — | 14,487 | 64–77 |
| 142 | September 13 | @ Indians | W 9–2 | VerHagen (1–0) | Bauer (11–12) | — | 14,487 | 65–77 |
| 143 | September 14 | @ Twins | L 1–7 | Duffey (3–1) | Lobstein (3–8) | — | 17,833 | 65–78 |
| 144 | September 15 | @ Twins | W 5–4 | Simón (13–9) | Hughes (10–9) | Rondón (5) | 22,963 | 66–78 |
| 145 | September 16 | @ Twins | W 7–4 (12) | Krol (2–3) | Duensing (4–1) | — | 22,509 | 67–78 |
| 146 | September 18 | Royals | W 5–4 (12) | VerHagen (2–0) | Holland (3–2) | — | 32,926 | 68–78 |
| 147 | September 19 | Royals | W 6–5 (11) | Gorzelanny (2–2) | Almonte (0–1) | — | 36,007 | 69–78 |
| 148 | September 20 | Royals | L 3–10 | Medlen (5–1) | Simón (13–10) | Duffy (1) | 32,788 | 69–79 |
| 149 | September 21 | White Sox | L 0–2 | Samardzija (10–13) | Ryan (2–4) | — | 34,175 | 69–80 |
| 150 | September 21 | White Sox | L 2–3 | Johnson (3–0) | Wolf (0–4) | Robertson (31) | 28,499 | 69–81 |
| 151 | September 22 | White Sox | W 2–1 (10) | Hardy (5–3) | Duke (3–6) | — | 27,829 | 70–81 |
| 152 | September 23 | White Sox | W 7–4 | Verlander (4–8) | Montas (0–1) | Feliz (8) | 31,889 | 71–81 |
| 153 | September 25 | Twins | W 6–4 | Wilson (3–3) | Perkins (2–5) | Feliz (9) | 31,153 | 72–81 |
| 154 | September 26 | Twins | L 2–6 | Duffey (5–1) | Simón (13–11) | — | 32,753 | 72–82 |
| 155 | September 27 | Twins | L 1–7 | Santana (7–4) | Wolf (0–5) | — | 33,517 | 72–83 |
| 156 | September 28 | @ Rangers | W 7–4 | Verlander (5–8) | Lewis (17–9) | Feliz (10) | 27,847 | 73–83 |
| 157 | September 29 | @ Rangers | L 6–7 | Hamels (6–1) | Farmer (0–4) | Tolleson (34) | 28,729 | 73–84 |
| 158 | September 30 | @ Rangers | L 2–6 | Gallardo (13–11) | Boyd (1–6) | — | 28,633 | 73–85 |

October (1–2)

| # | Date | Opponent | Score | Win | Loss | Save | Attendance | Record |
|---|---|---|---|---|---|---|---|---|
| 159 | October 2 | @ White Sox | L 1–2 | Sale (13–11) | Simón (13–12) | Robertson (34) | 18,030 | 73–86 |
| 160 | October 3 | @ White Sox | L 3–4 | Jones (2–2) | Feliz (3–4) | — | 17,772 | 73–87 |
| 161 | October 4 | @ White Sox | W 6–0 | Norris (3–2) | Montas (0–2) | — | 19,800 | 74–87 |

== Roster ==
2015 Detroit Tigers
Roster
| Pitchers: 62 Al Alburquerque; 48 Matt Boyd; 44 Joba Chamberlain; 45 Buck Farmer; 39 Neftalí Feliz; 26 Jeff Ferrell; 32 Tom Gorzelanny; 61 Shane Greene; 65 Blaine Hardy; 38 Guido Knudson; 46 Ian Krol; 53 Kyle Lobstein; 36 Joe Nathan; 60 Ángel Nesbitt; 44 Daniel Norris; 14 David Price; 43 Bruce Rondón; 56 Kyle Ryan; 19 Aníbal Sánchez; 31 Alfredo Simón; 38 Joakim Soria; 58 José Valdez; 54 Drew VerHagen; 35 Justin Verlander; 30 Alex Wilson; 52 Randy Wolf | Catchers: 13 Alex Avila; 50 Bryan Holaday; 34 James McCann; Infielders: 24 Miguel Cabrera; 9 Nick Castellanos; 1 José Iglesias; 3 Ian Kinsler; 57 Marc Krauss; 49 Dixon Machado; 55 Jefry Marté; 41 Víctor Martínez; 26 Hernán Pérez; 27 Andrew Romine; 39,40 Josh Wilson; Outfielders: 52 Yoenis Céspedes; 18 Tyler Collins; 20 Rajai Davis; 29 Daniel Fields; 12 Anthony Gose; 28 J. D. Martinez; 33 Steven Moya | Manager: 7 Brad Ausmus; Coaches: 17 Mick Billmeyer (bullpen); 25 Dave Clark (third base); 51 Jeff Jones (pitching); 8 Wally Joyner (hitting); 22 Gene Lamont (bench); 88 Matt Martin (defense coordinator); 59 David Newhan (assistant hitting); 15 Omar Vizquel (first base) |

=== Player stats ===
==== Batting ====
Note: G = Games played; AB = At bats; R = Runs scored; H = Hits; 2B = Doubles; 3B = Triples; HR = Home runs; RBI = Runs batted in; AVG = Batting average; SB = Stolen bases

| Player | G | AB | R | H | 2B | 3B | HR | RBI | AVG | SB |
|---|---|---|---|---|---|---|---|---|---|---|
| Alex Avila | 67 | 178 | 21 | 34 | 5 | 0 | 4 | 13 | .191 | 0 |
| Miguel Cabrera | 119 | 429 | 64 | 145 | 28 | 1 | 18 | 76 | .338 | 1 |
| Nick Castellanos | 154 | 549 | 42 | 140 | 33 | 6 | 15 | 73 | .255 | 0 |
| Yoenis Céspedes+ | 102 | 403 | 62 | 118 | 28 | 2 | 18 | 61 | .293 | 3 |
| Tyler Collins | 60 | 192 | 18 | 51 | 11 | 3 | 4 | 25 | .266 | 2 |
| Rajai Davis | 112 | 341 | 55 | 88 | 16 | 11 | 8 | 30 | .258 | 18 |
| Daniel Fields | 1 | 3 | 1 | 1 | 1 | 0 | 0 | 0 | .333 | 0 |
| Anthony Gose | 140 | 485 | 73 | 123 | 24 | 8 | 5 | 26 | .254 | 23 |
| Bryan Holaday | 24 | 64 | 3 | 18 | 5 | 0 | 2 | 13 | .281 | 0 |
| José Iglesias | 120 | 416 | 44 | 125 | 17 | 3 | 2 | 23 | .300 | 11 |
| Ian Kinsler | 154 | 624 | 94 | 185 | 35 | 7 | 11 | 73 | .296 | 10 |
| Marc Krauss | 12 | 33 | 1 | 5 | 0 | 0 | 1 | 2 | .152 | 0 |
| Dixon Machado | 24 | 68 | 6 | 16 | 3 | 0 | 0 | 5 | .235 | 1 |
| Jefry Marté | 33 | 80 | 9 | 17 | 4 | 0 | 4 | 11 | .213 | 0 |
| J. D. Martinez | 158 | 596 | 93 | 168 | 33 | 2 | 38 | 102 | .282 | 3 |
| Víctor Martínez | 120 | 440 | 39 | 108 | 20 | 0 | 11 | 64 | .245 | 0 |
| James McCann | 114 | 401 | 32 | 106 | 18 | 5 | 7 | 41 | .264 | 0 |
| Steven Moya | 9 | 22 | 1 | 4 | 0 | 1 | 0 | 0 | .182 | 0 |
| Hernán Pérez+ | 22 | 33 | 1 | 2 | 0 | 0 | 0 | 0 | .061 | 1 |
| Andrew Romine | 109 | 184 | 25 | 47 | 5 | 0 | 2 | 15 | .255 | 10 |
| Josh Wilson | 21 | 38 | 4 | 12 | 3 | 0 | 0 | 5 | .316 | 0 |
| Pitcher totals | 161 | 26 | 1 | 2 | 0 | 0 | 1 | 2 | .077 | 0 |
| Team totals | 161 | 5605 | 689 | 1515 | 289 | 49 | 151 | 660 | .270 | 83 |

+Totals with Tigers only.

==== Starters ====
Note: W = Wins; L = Losses; ERA = Earned run average; G = Games pitched; GS = Games started; SV = Saves; IP = Innings pitched; R = Runs allowed; ER = Earned runs allowed; BB = Walks allowed; K = Strikeouts

| Player | W | L | ERA | G | GS | SV | IP | R | ER | BB | K |
|---|---|---|---|---|---|---|---|---|---|---|---|
| Matt Boyd+ | 1 | 4 | 6.57 | 11 | 10 | 0 | 50 2/3 | 39 | 37 | 19 | 36 |
| Buck Farmer | 0 | 4 | 7.36 | 14 | 5 | 0 | 40 1/3 | 35 | 33 | 17 | 24 |
| Shane Greene | 4 | 8 | 6.88 | 18 | 16 | 0 | 83 2/3 | 67 | 64 | 27 | 50 |
| Kyle Lobstein | 3 | 8 | 5.94 | 13 | 11 | 0 | 63 2/3 | 43 | 42 | 23 | 32 |
| Daniel Norris+ | 2 | 1 | 3.68 | 8 | 8 | 0 | 36 2/3 | 20 | 15 | 7 | 27 |
| David Price+ | 9 | 4 | 2.53 | 21 | 21 | 0 | 146 | 50 | 41 | 29 | 138 |
| Kyle Ryan | 2 | 4 | 4.47 | 16 | 6 | 0 | 56 1/3 | 29 | 28 | 20 | 30 |
| Aníbal Sánchez | 10 | 10 | 4.99 | 25 | 25 | 0 | 157 | 89 | 87 | 49 | 138 |
| Alfredo Simón | 13 | 12 | 5.05 | 31 | 31 | 0 | 187 | 112 | 105 | 68 | 117 |
| Justin Verlander | 5 | 8 | 3.38 | 20 | 20 | 0 | 133 1/3 | 56 | 50 | 32 | 113 |
| Randy Wolf | 0 | 5 | 6.23 | 8 | 7 | 0 | 34 2/3 | 28 | 24 | 15 | 28 |

+Totals with Tigers only.

==== Bullpen ====
Note: W = Wins; L = Losses; ERA = Earned run average; G = Games pitched; GS = Games started; SV = Saves; IP = Innings pitched; R = Runs allowed; ER = Earned runs allowed; BB = Walks allowed; K = Strikeouts

| Player | W | L | ERA | G | GS | SV | IP | R | ER | BB | K |
|---|---|---|---|---|---|---|---|---|---|---|---|
| Al Alburquerque | 4 | 1 | 4.21 | 67 | 0 | 0 | 62 | 29 | 29 | 33 | 58 |
| Joba Chamberlain+ | 0 | 2 | 4.09 | 30 | 0 | 0 | 22 | 15 | 10 | 5 | 15 |
| Neftalí Feliz | 2 | 2 | 7.62 | 30 | 0 | 4 | 28 1/3 | 24 | 24 | 9 | 23 |
| Jeff Ferrell | 0 | 0 | 6.35 | 9 | 0 | 0 | 11 1/3 | 8 | 8 | 4 | 6 |
| Tom Gorzelanny | 2 | 2 | 5.95 | 48 | 0 | 0 | 39 1/3 | 28 | 26 | 23 | 36 |
| Blaine Hardy | 5 | 3 | 3.08 | 70 | 0 | 0 | 61 1/3 | 23 | 21 | 22 | 55 |
| Guido Knudson | 0 | 0 | 18.00 | 4 | 0 | 0 | 5 | 10 | 10 | 3 | 6 |
| Ian Krol | 2 | 3 | 5.79 | 33 | 0 | 0 | 28 | 19 | 18 | 17 | 26 |
| Joe Nathan | 0 | 0 | 0.00 | 1 | 0 | 1 | 1/3 | 0 | 0 | 0 | 1 |
| Ángel Nesbitt | 1 | 1 | 5.40 | 24 | 0 | 0 | 21 2/3 | 14 | 13 | 8 | 14 |
| Bruce Rondón | 1 | 0 | 5.81 | 35 | 0 | 5 | 31 | 22 | 20 | 19 | 36 |
| Joakim Soria+ | 3 | 1 | 2.85 | 43 | 0 | 23 | 41 | 13 | 13 | 11 | 16 |
| José Valdez | 0 | 1 | 4.00 | 7 | 0 | 0 | 9 | 4 | 4 | 4 | 4 |
| Drew VerHagen | 2 | 0 | 2.05 | 20 | 0 | 0 | 26 1/3 | 6 | 6 | 14 | 13 |
| Alex Wilson | 3 | 3 | 2.19 | 59 | 1 | 2 | 70 | 19 | 17 | 11 | 38 |
| Josh Wilson | 0 | 0 | 9.00 | 1 | 0 | 0 | 1 | 1 | 1 | 0 | 0 |
| Team Pitching Totals | 74 | 87 | 4.64 | 161 | 161 | 35 | 1447 | 803 | 746 | 489 | 1100 |

+Totals with Tigers only.

== Farm system ==
| Level | Team | League | Manager |
|---|---|---|---|
| AAA | Toledo Mud Hens | International League | Larry Parrish |
| AA | Erie SeaWolves | Eastern League | Lance Parrish |
| A | Lakeland Flying Tigers | Florida State League | Dave Huppert |
| A | West Michigan Whitecaps | Midwest League | Andrew Graham |
| A-Short Season | Connecticut Tigers | New York–Penn League | Mike Rabelo |
| Rookie | GCL Tigers | Gulf Coast League | Basilio Cabrera |

LEAGUE CHAMPIONS: West Michigan
