= Pitt Community College =

College in Winterville, North Carolina, US

Coordinates: 35°33′02″N 77°24′31″W

- Former names: Pitt Technical Institute, Pitt Industrial Education Center
- Motto: Educating and Empowering People for Success
- Type: Public community college
- Established: March 1961
- Parent institution: North Carolina Community College System
- Endowment: $82.4 million
- President: Maria Pharr
- Faculty: 314 (FTE)
- Total staff: 618 (FTE)
- Students: 7,400
- Location: Winterville, North Carolina, United States
- Campus: 296 acres (120 ha); Urban
- Colors: Blue and White
- Nickname: PCC Bulldogs
- Mascot: Bruiser
- Website: www.pittcc.edu

Pitt Community College (PCC) is a public community college in Winterville, North Carolina in Pitt County. The college is part of the North Carolina Community College System. It has an enrollment of over 7,000 undergraduate students with a total of 10,322 students enrolled in the Curriculum Program. Pitt Community College is accredited by the Southern Association of Colleges and Schools to award associate degrees.

== History ==
PCC was chartered and designated by the North Carolina State Board of Education as an industrial education center in March 1961. The college began its operation as Pitt Industrial Education Center during the same year. Lloyd Spaulding served as the director of the center. The programs developed and expanded and in 1964 the school was designated a technical institute by the State Board of Education. The name was changed in 1964 to Pitt Technical Institute. That same year, William E. Fulford became the college's president (1964-1984) and the college opened in its new facility, the Vernon E. White Building, with nine programs and 96 students.

PCC was first accredited by the Southern Association of Colleges and Schools in 1969. In 1979, the North Carolina General Assembly enacted a bill that changed Pitt Technical Institute to Pitt Community College. The change brought about the addition of the two-year University Transfer programs and two more buildings, the Robert Lee Humber Building (1970) and the Kay V. Whichard Building (1979).

Charles E. Russell, a Jamesville native, was named PCC's third president in 1984. He served until 2003. During his tenure, the college added 32 curriculum degree programs and held three successful, major bond referendums. In 1991, he encouraged college trustees to spend $2 million in bond revenue to purchase 105 acres from H.L. Bowen’s heirs, thus providing a foundation for much of the college's future growth.

Seven buildings were added to the PCC main campus during Russell’s tenure:

- Clifton W. Everett Building — Opened in 1987 to provide a home for the college’s Learning Resource Center. It was completely renovated between March 2018 and February 2020.
- A.B. Whitley Building — A vocational education classroom and lab/shop building, the A.B. Whitley Building, was opened in February, 1990. The 32,300-square-foot (3,000 m^{2}) facility provides space for STEM programs. The Planning and Research Department was also located in the building.
- William E. Fulford Building — Opened in January 1993, it provides instructional/office space for allied health curricula.
- Masonry/Welding Building — The building, which includes the John Roberts Welding Lab, opened in April 1993.
- Henry Leslie Building — Opened in November 1996, it provides space for the college’s Transitional Studies Department.
- Edward and Joan Warren Building — Opened in January 2000, the building houses the Charles Coburn Center, which is home to the college’s women’s volleyball and men’s basketball teams. It also hosts offices and classrooms for placement testing, PCC Athletics, TRiO and intramural sports.
- Raymond Reddrick Building — Completed in the spring of 2004, the building includes classrooms, offices, computer labs and the PCC Student Success Center.

In the fall of 1997, Pitt Community College, as well as the entire North Carolina Community College system, converted from a quarter system to a semester system.

Following Russell’s retirement, G. Dennis Massey was selected as PCC's fourth president on August 1, 2003.

In 2005, PCC trustees agreed to purchase the 131-acre Davenport property adjacent to Pitt's main campus and approved a Facilities Master Plan outlining future campus growth. The 2009 spring semester featured the opening of the Craig F. Goess Student Center followed by the Herman Simon Building for Health Sciences and the Construction and Industrial Technology (CIT) Building in 2012. Later in 2012, the new Facilities Services Complex and Charles E. Russell Building general classroom were opened. Five years later, PCC opened the bond-funded Walter and Marie Williams Building to further expand STEM programming.

In the summer of 2018, PCC welcomed Lawrence L. Rouse as its fifth president.

On April 6, 2023, PCC opened the Eddie & Jo Allison Smith Center for Student Advancement. The 28,000-square-foot structure is home to PCC's Institutional Advancement Division, which includes the PCC Foundation and the college's marketing and media relations departments.

In 2024, following Rouse's retirement, Maria Pharr became the college's sixth president. 2024 also ushered in the construction on the new Welding Technology Building. This building will provide a new level of modern technology and capacity for PCC's welding program, one of the college's largest curricula, after three decades in its previous location.

== Academics ==
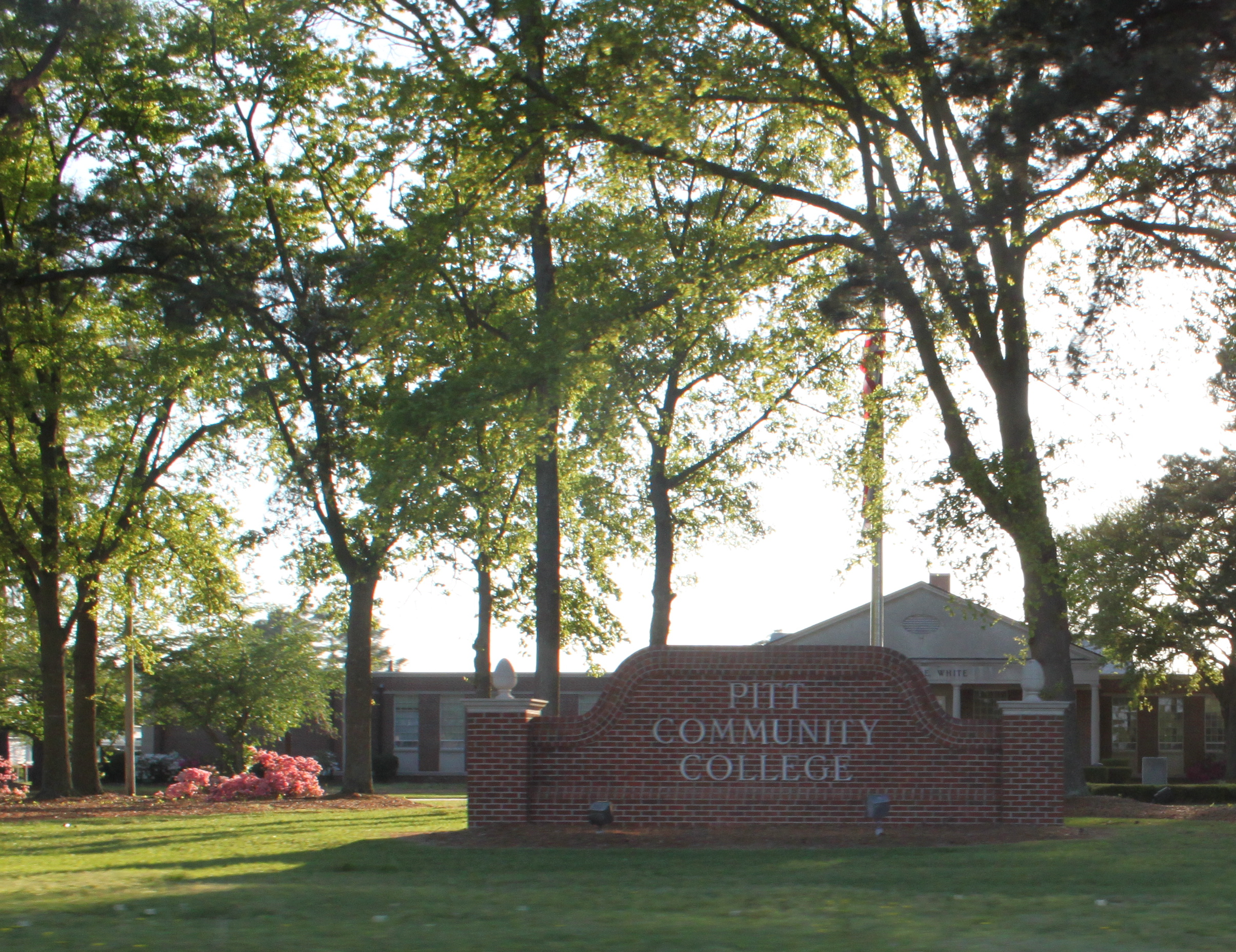
The school sign

PCC offers 3,000 classes via the Internet, 465 hybrid classes, and 1,112 traditional courses. As of 2023, 7,400 curriculum students and 8,745 continuing education students were enrolled. The average class size in 2021 was 27 with a 15:1 student to faculty ratio. PCC offers 44 associate degree programs, 20 certificate programs, 22 diploma programs, and 18 University Transfer programs leading to bachelor's degrees at four-year institutions. Academic programs are divided into five categories: Arts and Sciences, Business, Construction and Industrial Technology, Health Sciences, and Legal Science and Public Services. PCC also has a large Adult Education and Community Service division.

== Athletics ==
The college athletics teams are nicknamed the Bulldogs. The intercollegiate sports offered by the athletics department are baseball, basketball, softball, and volleyball, while intramural sports at the school include flag football, spikeball, cornhole, and esports.

== Notable alumni ==
- Freddie Bynum, baseball player with the Chicago Cubs, Baltimore Orioles, Oakland Athletics, and Orix Buffaloes
- Lonnie Chisenhall, baseball player with the Cleveland Indians
- Jimmy Donaldson, YouTuber, media personality, and businessman popularly known as "MrBeast"
- Jeff Ferrell, baseball player with the Detroit Tigers
- Paul Gervase, baseball player with the Tampa Bay Rays
