= Kyle Lobstein =

American baseball player (born 1989)

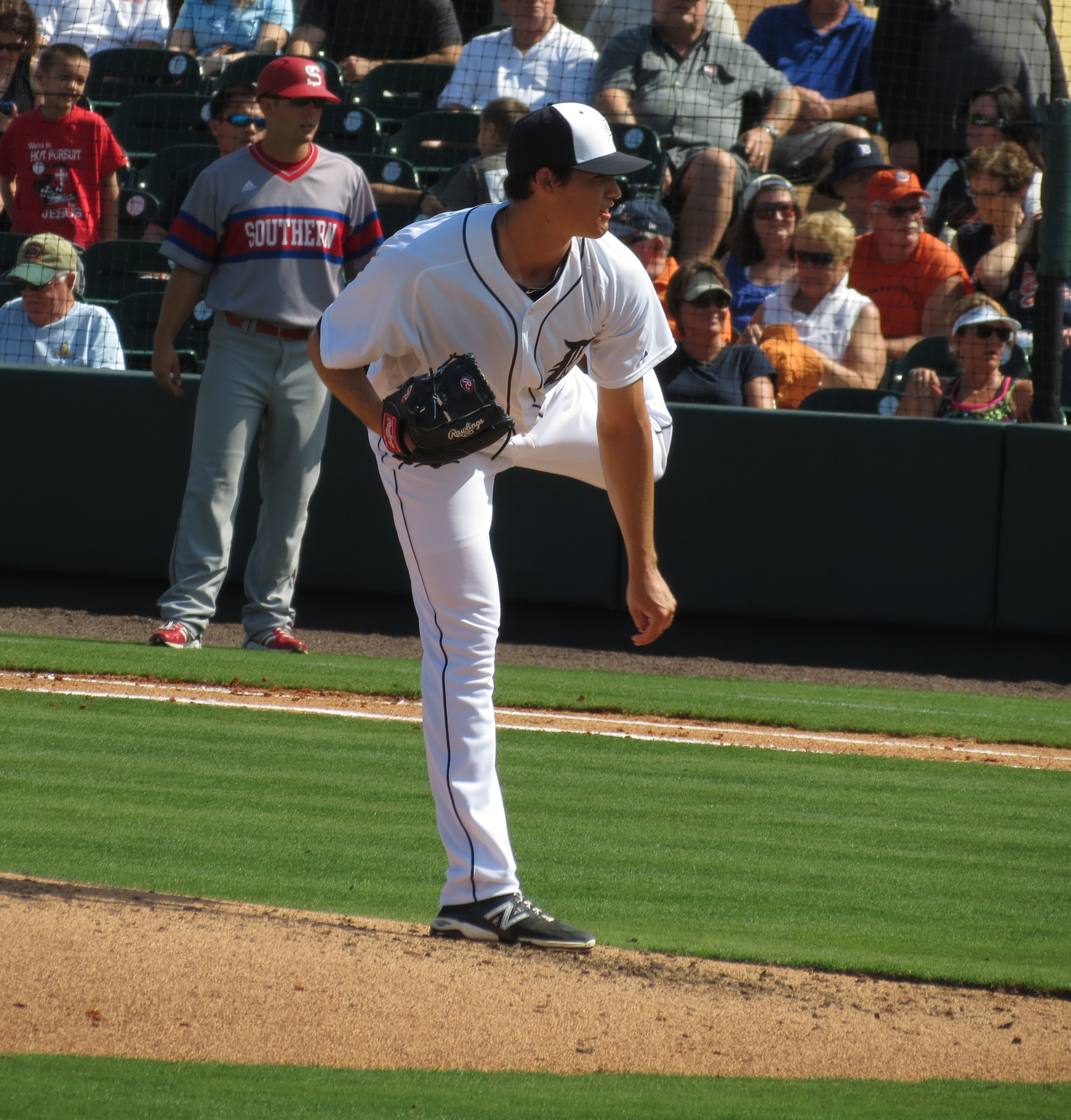
- Lobstein with the Detroit Tigers

Free agent
- Pitcher
- Born: August 12, 1989 (age 37); Flagstaff, Arizona, U.S.
- Bats: Left Throws: Left

MLB debut
- August 23, 2014, for the Detroit Tigers

MLB statistics (through 2021 season)
- Win–loss record: 6–10
- Earned run average: 5.22
- Strikeouts: 75
- Stats at Baseball Reference

Teams
- Detroit Tigers (2014–2015); Pittsburgh Pirates (2016); Washington Nationals (2021)

Kyle Eric Lobstein (born August 12, 1989) is an American professional baseball pitcher who is a free agent. He has previously played in Major League Baseball (MLB) for the Detroit Tigers, Pittsburgh Pirates, and Washington Nationals.

== Personal life ==
Lobstein is a native of Flagstaff, Arizona, and attended Coconino High School. As a 9-year old, Kyle was coached in youth basketball by future ESPN and Comcast SportsNet Houston anchor Steve Bunin.

== Professional career ==
=== Tampa Bay Rays ===
The Tampa Bay Rays selected Lobstein in the second round, 47th overall, of the 2008 Major League Baseball draft. He made his professional debut with the Low-A Hudson Valley Renegades, posting a 3–5 record and 2.58 ERA in 14 games. In 2010, Lobstein played for the Single-A Bowling Green Hot Rods, logging a 9–8 record and 4.14 ERA in 27 appearances. The following season, Lobstein split the year between the High-A Charlotte Stone Crabs and the Double-A Montgomery Biscuits, pitching to a cumulative 10–10 record and 4.01 ERA with 96 strikeouts in 132.1 innings of work. Lobstein returned to Montgomery for the 2012 season, recording an 8–7 record and 4.06 ERA with 129 strikeouts in 144.0 innings pitched.

=== Detroit Tigers ===
Lobstein was selected in the 2012 Rule 5 draft by the New York Mets, and traded that same day to the Detroit Tigers. On March 25, 2013, the Tigers retained the Rule 5 rights to Lobstein after trading catcher Curt Casali to the Rays, and outrighted Lobstein off of the 40-man roster. He split the season between the Double-A Erie SeaWolves and the Triple-A Toledo Mud Hens, posting a 13–7 record and 3.27 ERA in 28 starts between the two teams. The Tigers added Lobstein to their 40-man roster on November 20, 2013. He was assigned to Toledo to begin the 2014 season.

On August 23, 2014, the Tigers promoted Lobstein to the major leagues before a doubleheader against the Minnesota Twins. Prior to being called up, Lobstein was 9–11 with a 4.07 ERA and a 1.479 WHIP in 26 games with Triple-A Toledo. Lobstein made his debut in the first game of the doubleheader, pitching 5 2/3 innings, allowing three runs on four hits, while walking four, and striking out three. Lobstein made his first major league start on August 28, against the New York Yankees. He pitched six innings, allowing two runs, one earned, on four hits and one walk, while earning a no-decision. Following the game, Lobstein was optioned back to Triple-A Toledo. On September 2, Lobstein was recalled from Triple-A, and made his second major league start of the season that night against the Cleveland Indians. Lobstein pitched 5 1/3 innings, allowing two runs on five hits, while walking three and striking out a career-high ten batters. On September 7, Lobstein pitched 5 2/3 innings, allowing one run on four hits, while walking two and striking out three, to earn his first major league win over the San Francisco Giants.

Lobstein opened the 2015 season in the Tigers rotation due to Justin Verlander not being able to start the season with a right triceps strain. Lobstein had a 3–5 record, with a 4.34 ERA and a 1.448 WHIP in eight starts before being placed on the disabled list with left shoulder soreness on May 24, 2015. During his rehab assignment, he pitched in two starts for the High-A Lakeland Flying Tigers and four for the Triple-A Toledo Mud Hens. He went 0–3 with a 5.68 ERA between the two stops. The Tigers activated Lobstein from the disabled list on September 3, 2015. During the 2015 season, Lobstein went 3–8 with a 5.94 ERA and a 1.586 WHIP in 13 outings, including 11 starts with the Tigers. He was designated for assignment by the Tigers on December 18, 2015.

=== Pittsburgh Pirates ===
On December 21, 2015, Lobstein was traded to the Pittsburgh Pirates in exchange for cash considerations. Lobstein split time between Pittsburgh and the Triple-A Indianapolis Indians, and through 14 games with the Pirates, Lobstein recorded a 3.96 ERA over 25 innings. He gave up 11 earned runs on 25 hits while walking 12 batters. On August 30, 2016, Lobstein was designated for assignment.

=== Baltimore Orioles ===
On August 31, 2016, Lobstein was traded to the Baltimore Orioles in exchange for Zach Phillips. He was designated for assignment that same day when the Orioles claimed Drew Stubbs. He was sent outright to the Triple-A Norfolk Tides on September 3, where he pitched in one game before their season ended. He elected free agency on October 5.

=== Miami Marlins ===
On November 17, 2016, Lobstein signed a minor league deal with the Miami Marlins organization. Lobstein split the 2017 season between the Triple-A New Orleans Baby Cakes and the Double-A Jacksonville Jumbo Shrimp, recording a cumulative 2.11 ERA with 31 strikeouts in 42 2/3 innings of work. He elected free agency following the season on November 6, 2017.

=== Toros de Tijuana ===
On March 20, 2018, Lobstein signed with the Toros de Tijuana of the Mexican League. Lobstein finished out the Spring Tournament of the season, recording a 4–2 record and a 2.95 ERA across 11 starts. He was released by the team on June 21.

=== Los Angeles Dodgers ===
On June 22, 2018, Lobstein signed a minor league contract with the Los Angeles Dodgers organization. He was 4–7 with a 3.79 ERA across 14 starts for the Double-A Tulsa Drillers and the Triple-A Oklahoma City Dodgers. Lobstein elected free agency following the season on November 2.

=== Oakland Athletics ===
On November 9, 2018, Lobstein signed a minor league contract with the Oakland Athletics organization. He spent the 2019 season with the Triple-A Las Vegas Aviators, logging a 6–4 record and 4.75 ERA in 43 appearances. Lobstein elected free agency following the season on November 4, 2019.

=== Los Angeles Dodgers (second stint) ===
On December 12, 2019, Lobstein signed a minor league contract to return to the Los Angeles Dodgers organization. Lobstein did not play in a game in 2020 due to the cancellation of the minor league season because of the COVID-19 pandemic. He became a free agent on November 2, 2020.

=== Washington Nationals ===
On March 22, 2021, Lobstein signed a minor league contract with the Washington Nationals organization. He was assigned to the Triple-A Rochester Red Wings to begin the season, where he pitched to a 1.69 ERA with 25 strikeouts in 16 appearances. On June 29, Lobstein was selected to the active roster. The following day, he made his first major league appearance since June 24, 2016, and allowed 1 run in 0 1/3 of an inning. After struggling to a 20.25 ERA in 3 appearances with Washington, Lobstein was designated for assignment on July 10.

=== Milwaukee Brewers ===
On July 13, 2021, Lobstein was traded to the Milwaukee Brewers in exchange for cash considerations and was optioned to the Triple-A Nashville Sounds. On August 17, Lobstein was designated for assignment by the Brewers. On August 20, Lobstein cleared waivers and was assigned outright to the Triple-A Nashville Sounds. On October 5, Lobstein elected free agency.

=== Toros de Tijuana (second stint) ===
On March 25, 2022, Lobstein signed with the Toros de Tijuana of the Mexican League. Lobstein appeared in 13 games for Tijuana, posting a 1–2 record and 5.01 ERA with 31 strikeouts in 23.1 innings pitched.

On February 15, 2023, Lobstein was loaned to the Lake Country DockHounds of the American Association of Professional Baseball. However, prior to the start of the American Association season on February 28, Lobstein's contract was returned to Tijuana.

=== Long Island Ducks ===
On March 8, 2023, Lobstein signed with the Long Island Ducks of the Atlantic League of Professional Baseball. In 37 games (12 starts), Lobstein struggled, going 5–5 with a 5.66 ERA and 81 strikeouts. He became a free agent following the season.

=== Lake Country DockHounds ===
On June 19, 2025, after a year of inactivity, Lobstein signed with the Lake Country DockHounds of the American Association of Professional Baseball. In six starts for Lake Country, he posted a 3–1 record and 5.34 ERA with 27 strikeouts across 30 1/3 innings pitched. Lobstein was released by the DockHounds on August 17.

== Scouting report ==
A finesse pitcher, Lobstein relies on a mid to high 80's fastball. He also throws a cutter, changeup and a curveball.
