= Alex Avila =

American baseball player (born 1987)

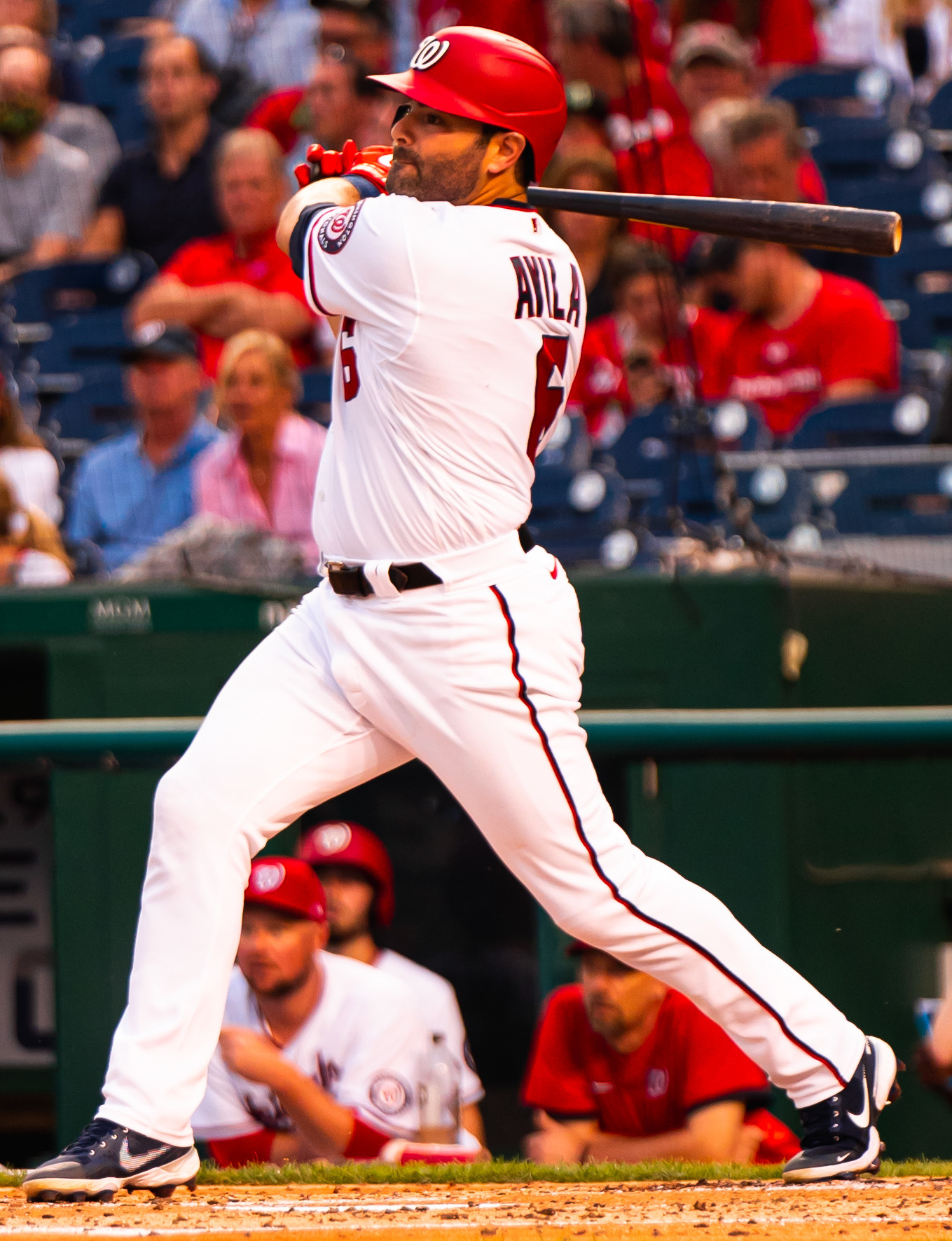
- Avila with the Washington Nationals in 2021
- Catcher
- Born: January 29, 1987 (age 39); Hialeah, Florida, U.S.
- Batted: Left Threw: Right

MLB debut
- August 6, 2009, for the Detroit Tigers

Last MLB appearance
- October 3, 2021, for the Washington Nationals

MLB statistics
- Batting average: .233
- Home runs: 105
- Runs batted in: 397
- Stats at Baseball Reference

Teams
- Detroit Tigers (2009–2015); Chicago White Sox (2016); Detroit Tigers (2017); Chicago Cubs (2017); Arizona Diamondbacks (2018–2019); Minnesota Twins (2020); Washington Nationals (2021)

Career highlights and awards
- All-Star (2011); Silver Slugger Award (2011)

Alexander Thomas Avila (born January 29, 1987) is an American former professional baseball catcher. Between 2009 and 2021 he played for the Detroit Tigers, Chicago White Sox, Chicago Cubs, Arizona Diamondbacks and Minnesota Twins and Washington Nationals. Avila is the son of former Tigers general manager Al Avila.

Avila was the Tigers' starting catcher for the team's four straight American League Central Division titles, which included catching Cy Young Award seasons for starting pitchers Justin Verlander in 2011 and Max Scherzer in 2013.

Nicknamed "The Titanium Catcher" for the perception among many baseball fans that he was unusually likely to be hit by foul tips, Avila has a history of concussions and concussion-like symptoms. He spent time on the disabled list for a concussion in 2013 and missed games on at least two occasions in 2014 for concussion-like symptoms after taking blows to the head. His most recent reported concussion occurred in the clinching Game 3 of the 2014 American League Division Series when a tipped foul ball hit him in the mask, knocking him out of the game and ending his season three innings early.

== Early baseball career ==
Avila played prep baseball at Archbishop McCarthy High School in Fort Lauderdale, Florida. He was drafted by the Detroit Tigers in the 34th round of the 2005 Major League Baseball draft, but chose to attend the University of Alabama where he was an All-SEC selection. In 2007, he played collegiate summer baseball with the Harwich Mariners of the Cape Cod Baseball League. Following his junior year in which he hit .343 with 17 home runs and 62 runs batted in (RBIs), he was then drafted by the Tigers in the fifth round of the 2008 Major League Baseball draft.

== Career ==
=== Detroit Tigers ===
==== 2009 ====
On August 6, 2009, Avila made his major league debut for the Tigers against the Baltimore Orioles where he had two hits, scoring a run and also batting one in. He started the following night, August 7, and in his first at bat of the game hit his first career home run off Anthony Swarzak. He finished the 2009 season playing in just 29 games, with a .279 batting average, 5 home runs, and 14 runs batted in.

==== 2010 ====
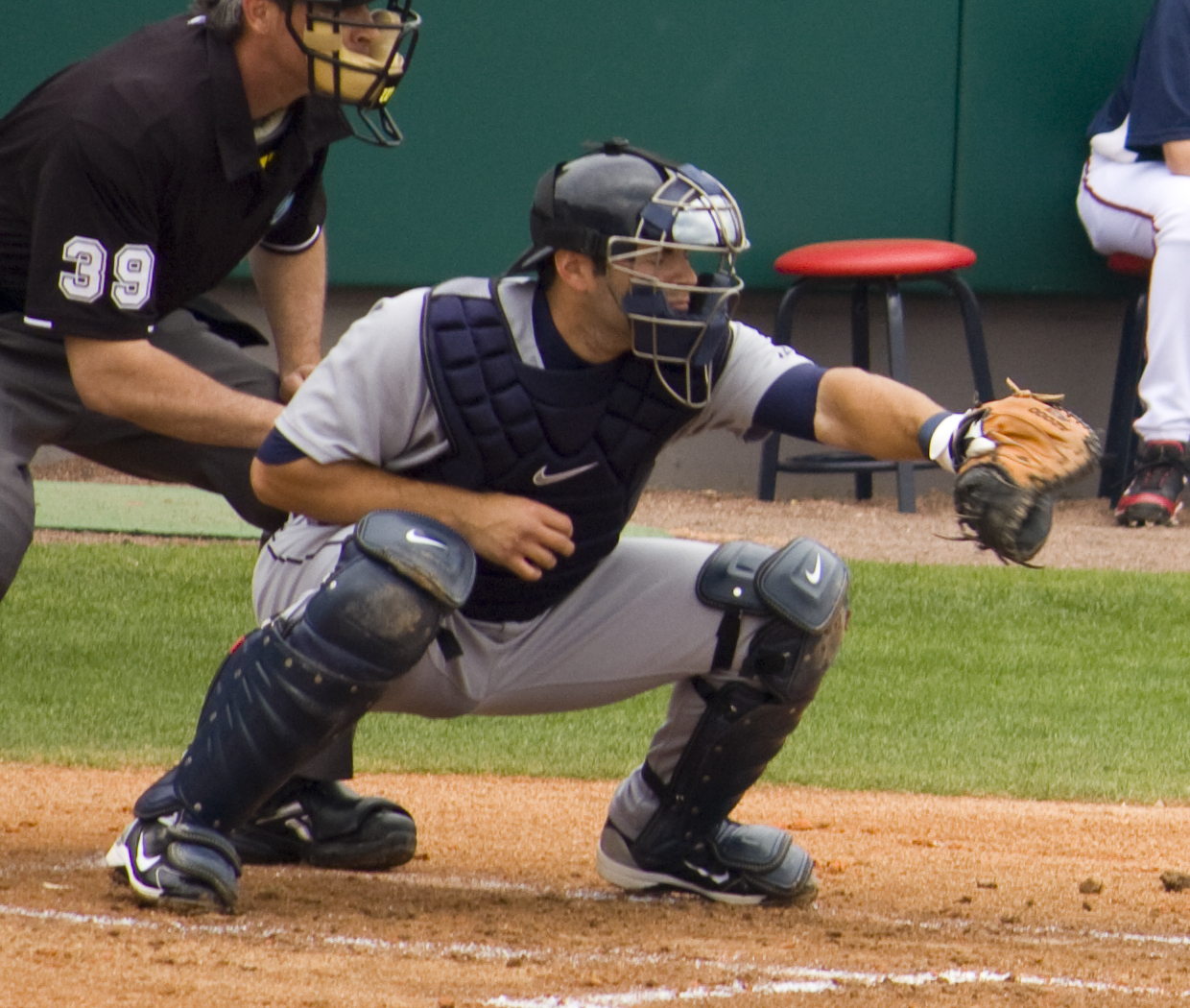
Avila in 2010

Avila made the Tigers 2010 Opening Day roster and shared playing time with starting catcher Gerald Laird. Baseball America ranked Avila as the sixth best prospect in the Detroit Tigers organization entering the 2010 season. Avila was the catcher for Armando Galarraga's near-perfect game on June 2, 2010. In part-time duty, he finished the season with a .228 average and 7 home runs in 294 at-bats, while throwing out 32% of potential base-stealers.

==== 2011 ====
Avila was named the Tigers starting catcher for the 2011 season, and showed considerable improvement. On July 3, 2011, he was voted to the All-Star team as the starting catcher for the American League, beating out New York Yankees catcher Russell Martin who had led through the majority of the voting. Alex also caught Justin Verlander's no hitter on May 7, 2011, against the Toronto Blue Jays. His season stats included a .295 batting average with 19 home runs and 82 runs batted in.

Avila won the 2011 Silver Slugger Award for the American League at catcher, making him the 10th Detroit Tigers catcher to win the award and first since Iván Rodríguez in 2004.

==== 2012 ====
Avila followed his career best 2011 season with one marked by inconsistency, particularly at the plate. Nagging injuries undercut his offensive performance while catching the fourth most games in the American League. His offensive numbers dropped across the board, as he finished with a .243 batting average, 9 home runs and 48 RBI. Avila was first in the American League in runners caught stealing, but also led the AL in passed balls.

==== 2013 ====
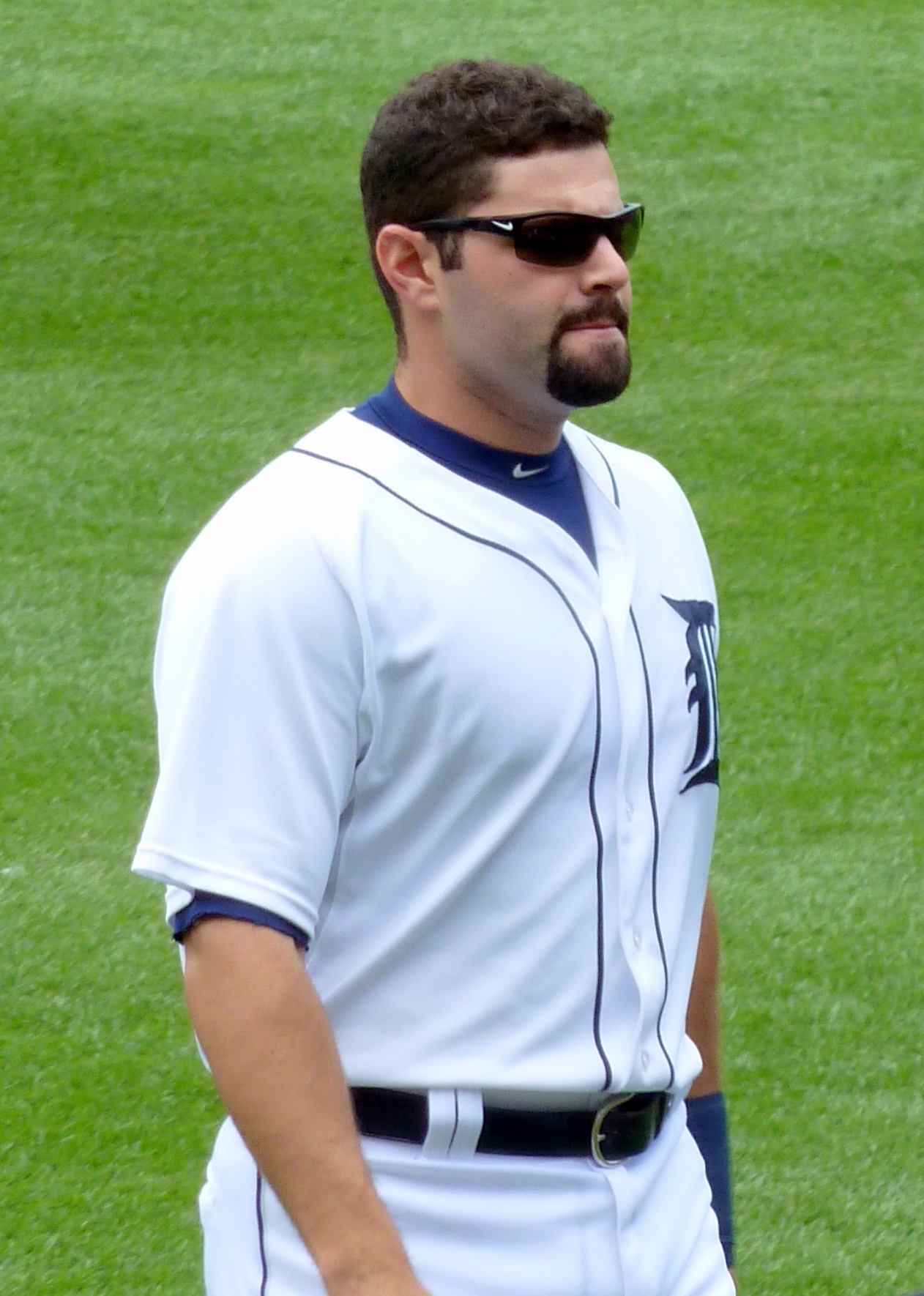
Avila in 2013

Avila had a horrible first half at the plate in 2013 and spent some time on the disabled list in June. Through the end of June, Avila was batting just .172.

He fared much better in the second half, hitting .281 over the season's final three months, including batting .343 in September (23-for-67). Avila hit the first grand slam of his career on July 30, 2013, against Washington Nationals pitcher Stephen Strasburg. In an August 5 game against the Cleveland Indians, a team the Tigers battled for first place in the AL Central all year, Alex clubbed a game-winning three-run homer in the top of the ninth inning off Indians closer Chris Perez. On September 15, Alex drove in all of the Tigers runs with two homers, including a go-ahead solo shot in the eighth inning, helping the Tigers to a crucial 3–2 win over the Kansas City Royals. He would finish the season batting .227 with 11 home runs and 47 RBI.

==== 2014 ====
On January 31, 2014, Alex avoided arbitration with the Tigers by signing a one-year contract worth $4.15 million, with a club option for 2015. His hitting struggles continued into the 2014 season, as he batted a career-low .218 while matching his 2013 totals of 11 home runs and 47 RBIs. He also struck out a career-high 151 times. Defensively, the season was a success, as Alex was a finalist for the 2014 Gold Glove Award at catcher. Avila allowed only 3 passed balls in 122 games at catcher, versus 9 and 10 the previous two seasons, and he threw out potential base stealers at a 34% rate, the highest of his career.

On November 17, 2014, the Tigers exercised the $5.4 million contract option on Avila for the 2015 season.

==== 2015 ====
The 2015 season was not kind to Avila, as he struggled mightily at the bat (.191, 4 home runs, 13 RBI) and lost his starting catcher position to James McCann. He suffered a knee injury that robbed him of some time as well. At the conclusion of the 2015 season Avila became a free agent, having reached 6 years of service time. His father Al Avila, named general manager of the Tigers following Dave Dombrowski's departure at the 2015 trade deadline, chose not to pursue his son in free agency.

=== Chicago White Sox ===
On November 25, 2015, Avila agreed on a one-year, $2.5 million contract with the Chicago White Sox. Injuries again shortened Avila's season. He played just 57 games for the 2016 White Sox, hitting .213 with 7 home runs. For the season, he had the highest strikeout percentage among major leaguers against right-handed pitchers (37.9%).

=== Second stint with the Detroit Tigers ===
On December 23, 2016, Avila signed a one-year, $2 million contract with the Detroit Tigers. On April 6, 2017, Avila hit an RBI double in the eighth inning on his first at-bat against his former team, the Chicago White Sox.

=== Chicago Cubs ===
On July 31, 2017, Avila and pitcher Justin Wilson were traded to the Chicago Cubs in exchange for infielder Jeimer Candelario, shortstop Isaac Paredes, and a player to be named later or cash considerations.

In 112 combined games with the Tigers and Cubs in 2017, Avila hit .264 with 14 home runs and 49 RBI.

=== Arizona Diamondbacks ===
On January 31, 2018, Avila signed a two-year contract with the Arizona Diamondbacks. For the 2018 season, he had the highest strikeout percentage among major leaguers against right-handed pitchers (39.5%). In 2019 for Arizona, Avila batted .207/.353/.421 with 9 home runs and 24 RBI in 201 plate appearances.

=== Minnesota Twins ===
On December 10, 2019, Avila signed with the Minnesota Twins on a one-year contract. In the abbreviated 2020 season for the Twins, Avila slashed .184/.355/.286 with 1 home run and 2 RBI across 23 games.

=== Washington Nationals ===
On January 28, 2021, Avila signed with the Washington Nationals on a one-year-contract. On September 19, 2021, Avila announced that he was retiring from baseball after a 13-year MLB career.

== Personal life ==
Avila is a first-generation Cuban American. His mother is Yamile Avila (formerly Tejas) and his father is Al Avila, the former general manager and executive vice president of baseball operations of the Detroit Tigers. Avila's godfather was former Los Angeles Dodgers manager Tommy Lasorda, who was a friend of Alex's father Al and grandfather Ralph.

When his father Al was named vice president and assistant general manager of the Tigers, Alex was a sophomore in high school. The family moved to the Metro Detroit area, and Alex attended De La Salle Collegiate High School in Warren, Michigan for his sophomore year. Alex moved back to Florida for his junior and senior years of high school.

His cousin, Nick Avila, was drafted by the Detroit Tigers in the 37th round of the 2011 Major League Baseball First Year Player Draft. Nick is currently a coach for the Gulf Coast Tigers.

His younger brother, Alan Avila, was drafted by the Detroit Tigers in 2008 in the 47th round; he chose to play baseball at Nova Southeastern University instead of signing. He did not continue his playing career after college and currently holds the title of Assistant Counsel, Baseball Relations for the Tigers.

He is married to Kristina Avila (formerly Pérez), whom he met in high school. They have two daughters, Avery Noelle, born on April 7, 2013, and Zoey Gabrielle, born on March 4, 2015.
