= Jefry Marté =

Dominican baseball player (born 1991)

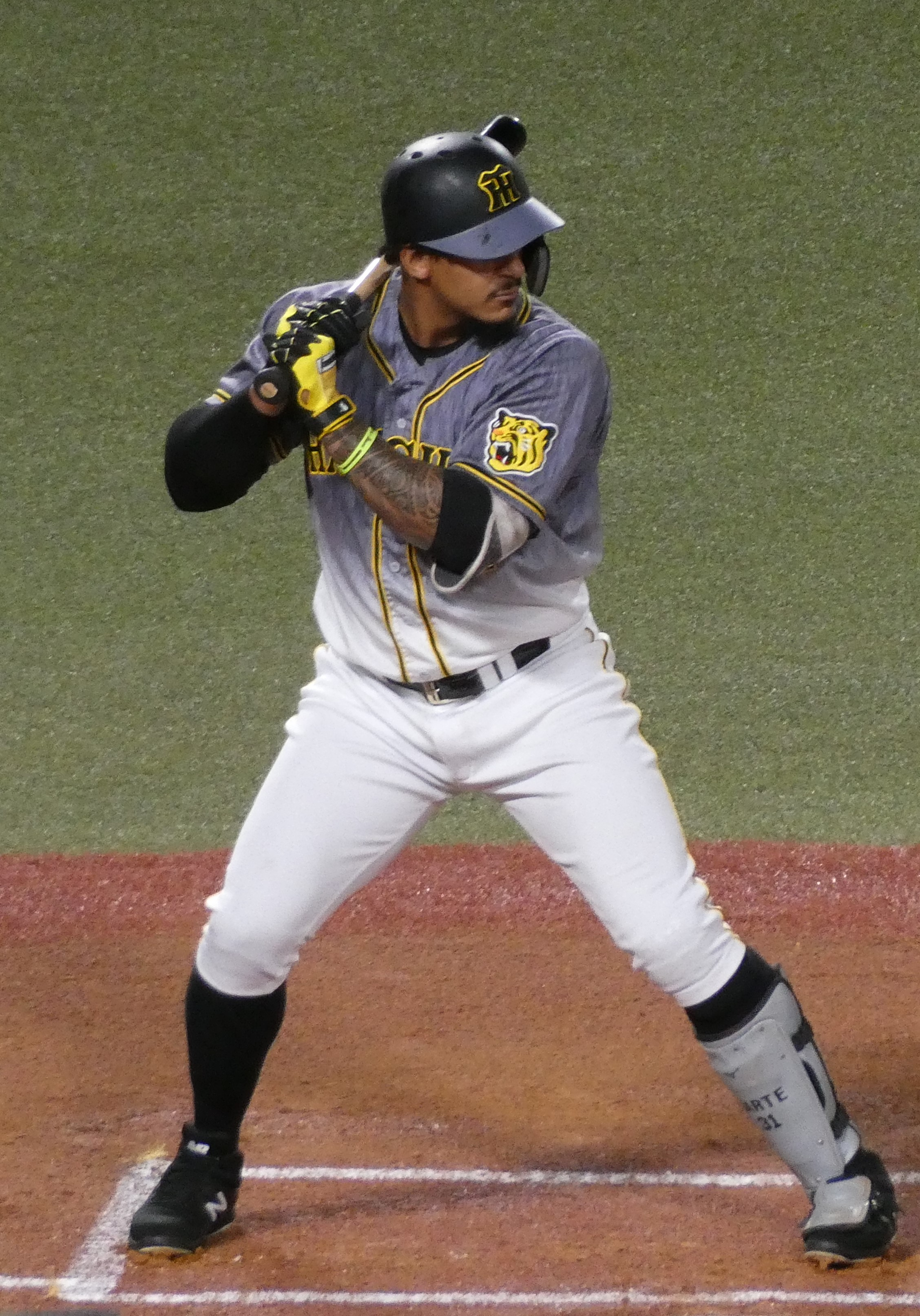
- Marté with the Hanshin Tigers

Free agent
- First baseman / Third baseman / Left fielder
- Born: June 21, 1991 (age 34); La Romana, La Romana, Dominican Republic
- Bats: Right Throws: Right

Professional debut
- MLB: July 5, 2015, for the Detroit Tigers
- NPB: April 29, 2019, for the Hanshin Tigers

MLB statistics (through 2018 season)
- Batting average: .222
- Home runs: 30
- Runs batted in: 91

NPB statistics (through 2022 season)
- Batting average: .266
- Home runs: 39
- Runs batted in: 145
- Stats at Baseball Reference

Teams
- Detroit Tigers (2015); Los Angeles Angels (2016–2018); Hanshin Tigers (2019–2022)

Career highlights and awards
- NPB All-Star (2021); Best Nine Award (2021)

Jefry Leonal Marté Paulino (born June 21, 1991) is a Dominican professional baseball first baseman, third baseman and left fielder who is a free agent. He has previously played in Major League Baseball (MLB) for the Detroit Tigers and Los Angeles Angels, and in Nippon Professional Baseball (NPB) for the Hanshin Tigers.

== Career ==
=== New York Mets ===
Marté signed as an international free agent with the New York Mets on July 2, 2007. He made his professional debut the following year, hitting .325 in 44 games for the rookie–level Gulf Coast League Mets. Marté spent the 2009 and 2010 seasons with the Single–A Savannah Sand Gnats, hitting .246/.301/.364 with 12 home runs and 85 RBI across 205 total appearances.

Marté played for the St. Lucie Mets of the High–A Florida State League in 2011, hitting .248/.313/.346 with seven home runs, 55 RBI, and 14 stolen bases across 131 games. He participated in the All-Star Futures Game during the 2011 season and the Arizona Fall League after the 2011 season. Marté played for the Binghamton Mets of the Double–A Eastern League in 2012, hitting .251/.322/.366 with nine home runs, 58 RBI, and 9 stolen bases.

=== Oakland Athletics ===
The Mets traded Marté to the Oakland Athletics on December 18, 2012, in exchange for outfielder Collin Cowgill. He spent the 2013 campaign with the Double–A Midland RockHounds, also appearing in five games for the rookie–level Arizona League Athletics. In 66 games for Midland, he hit .278/.349/.380 with two home runs, 28 RBI, and 8 stolen bases.

Marté spent 2014 back with Midland, playing in 107 games and batting .259/.333/.375 with a career–high 10 home runs, 53 RBI, and 9 stolen bases. He elected free agency following the season on November 4, 2014.

=== Detroit Tigers ===
On November 22, 2014, Marté signed a minor league contract with the Detroit Tigers. He began the 2015 season with the Triple–A Toledo Mud Hens, and was named the International League's player of the week for the first week of the season.

The Tigers promoted Marté to the major leagues on July 4, 2015, and made his major league debut the next day. In his first career major league start on July 8, he got his first major league hit, an RBI double in the second inning, and his first major league home run in the fourth inning.

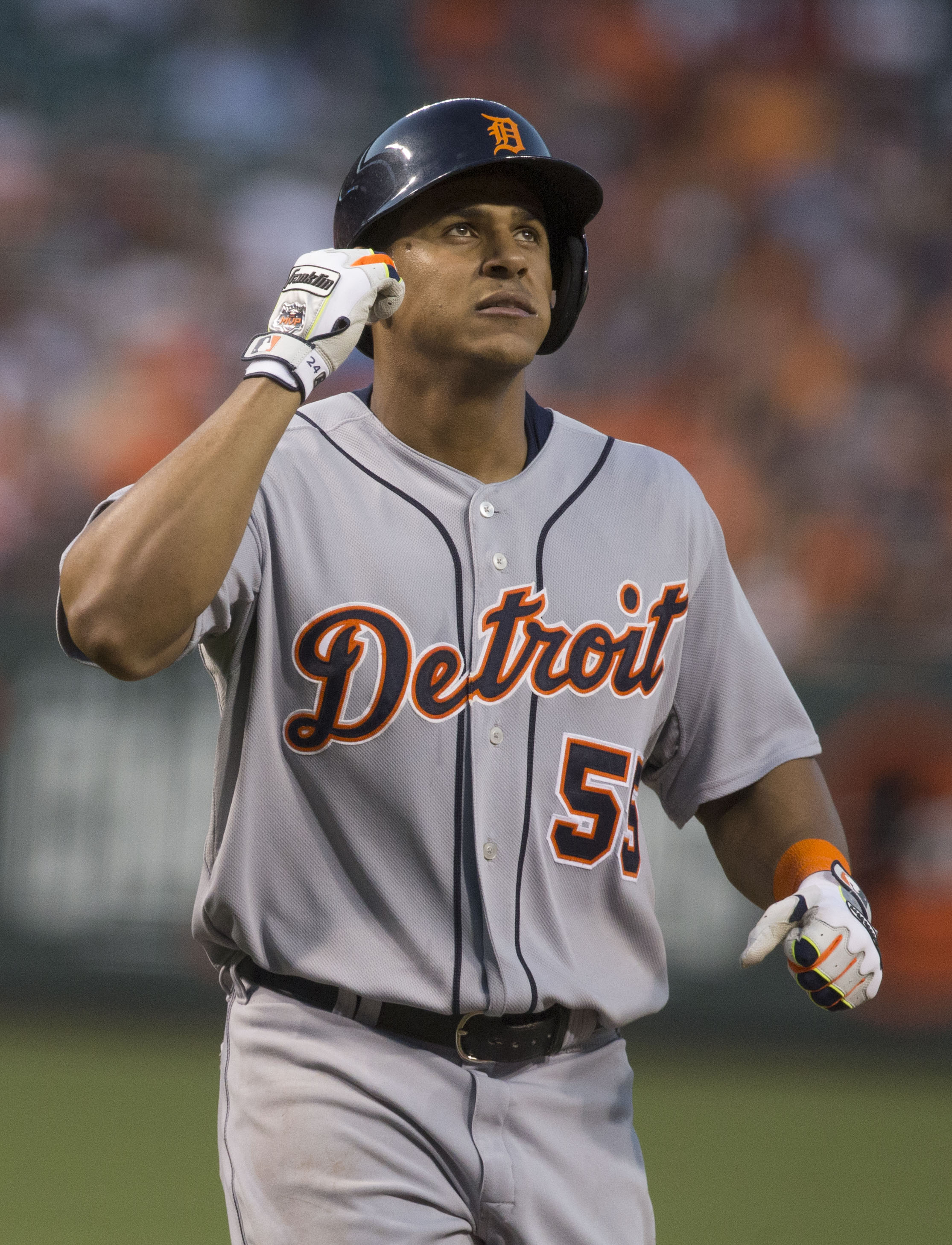
Marté with the Detroit Tigers

Marté filled in for an injured Miguel Cabrera in July and August, batting .250 (13-for-52) with four doubles, three home runs and seven RBIs. He batted .275 with 25 doubles, 15 home runs and 65 RBIs for Toledo. He was a September call-up, returning to the Tigers on September 8, 2015.

=== Los Angeles Angels ===
On January 27, 2016, Marté was traded to the Los Angeles Angels in exchange for Kody Eaves. He began the 2016 season with the Salt Lake Bees of the Triple–A Pacific Coast League, and was promoted to the major leagues on May 13. In 88 games during his rookie campaign, Marté slashed .252/.310/.481 with 15 home runs and 44 RBI. Marté made 45 appearances for Los Angeles in 2017, hitting .173/.269/.307 with four home runs and 14 RBI.

Marté played in 90 games for the Angels in 2018, batting .216/.273/.371 with seven home runs and 22 RBI. On November 2, 2018, he was removed from the 40–man roster and sent outright to Salt Lake. He subsequently rejected the assignment in favor of free agency.

=== Hanshin Tigers ===
On December 28, 2018, Marté signed with the Hanshin Tigers of Nippon Professional Baseball (NPB). In 105 games for Hanshin in 2019, he batted .284/.381/.444 with 12 home runs and 49 RBI.

On December 10, 2019, Marté signed a one-year extension to remain with the Tigers. He played in 29 games for the team in 2020, batting .252/.336/.447 with four home runs and 14 RBI.

Marté made 128 appearances for Hanshin during the 2021 season, slashing .258/.367/.451 with 22 home runs and 71 RBI. He played in 33 games for the Tigers in 2022, hitting .256/.324/.300 with one home run and 11 RBI. Marté became a free agent after the 2022 season.

=== Generales de Durango ===
On April 3, 2023, Marte signed with the Generales de Durango of the Mexican League. In 53 games for Durango, Marté hit .339/.454/.505 with six home runs and 32 RBI.

=== Karachi Monarchs ===
On October 23, 2023, Marte was drafted in the third round by the Karachi Monarchs, with the 20th overall pick, of the 2023 Baseball United inaugural draft.

=== Pericos de Puebla ===
On April 22, 2024, Marté signed with the Pericos de Puebla of the Mexican League. In 12 games for the Pericos, he hit .195/.353/.439 with three home runs and seven RBI. On May 13, Marté was released by Puebla.

=== Bravos de León ===
On June 15, 2024, Marté signed with the Bravos de León of the Mexican League. In 11 games, he batted .205/.354/.462 with three home runs and seven RBI. On July 1, Marté was released by León.

=== Milwaukee Milkmen ===
On January 16, 2025, Marté signed with the Milwaukee Milkmen of the American Association of Professional Baseball. In 30 appearances for the Milkmen, he batted .195/.248/.354 with four home runs, 19 RBI, and one stolen bases. Marte was released by Milwaukee on July 2.
