= Ángel Nesbitt =

Venezuelan baseball player (born 1990)

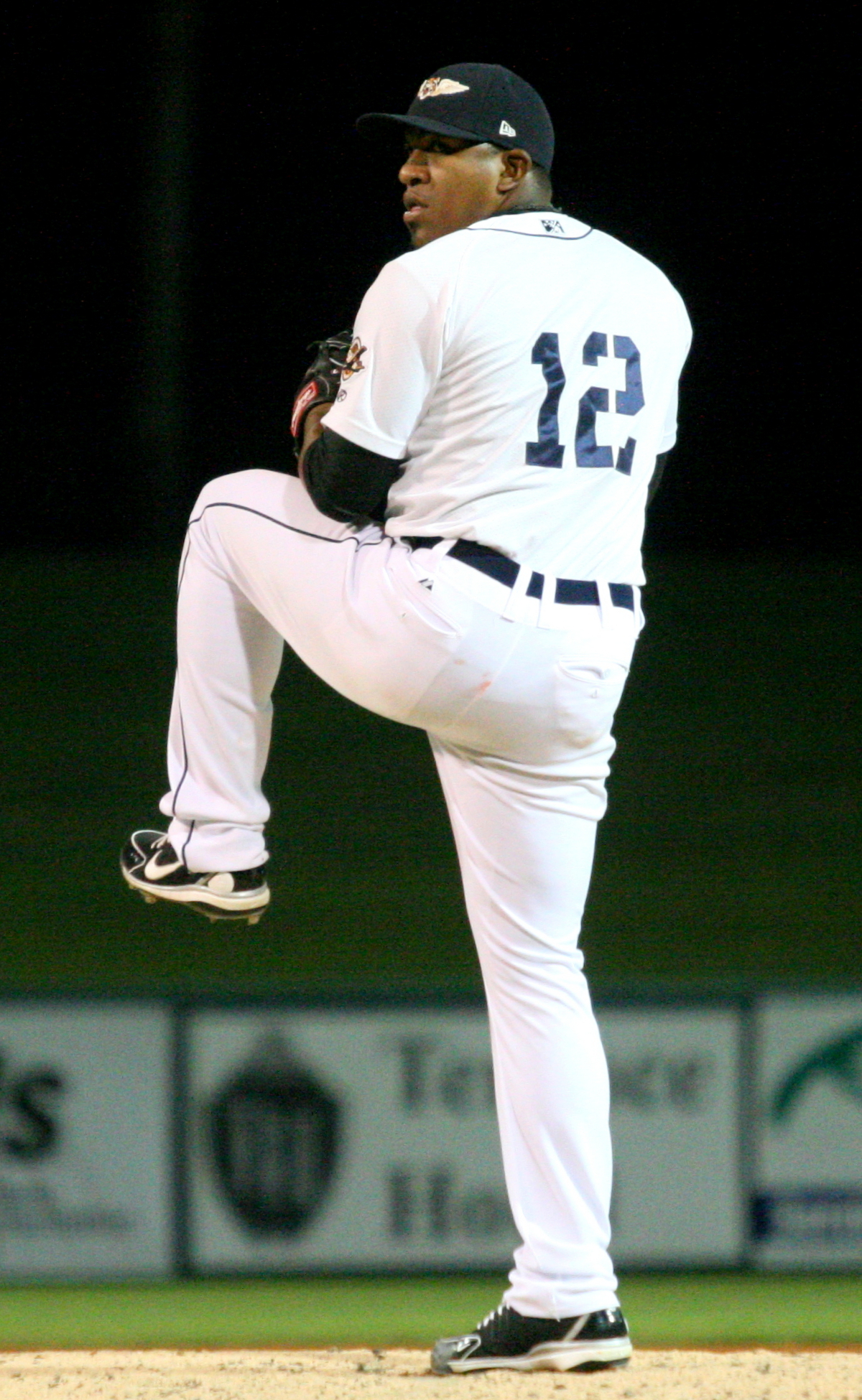
- Nesbitt pitching for the Lakeland Flying Tigers, advanced-A affiliates of the Tigers, in 2014.
- Pitcher
- Born: December 4, 1990 (age 35); Maracay, Aragua, Venezuela
- Batted: Right Threw: Right

MLB debut
- April 8, 2015, for the Detroit Tigers

Last MLB appearance
- June 10, 2015, for the Detroit Tigers

MLB statistics
- Win–loss record: 1–1
- Earned run average: 5.40
- Strikeouts: 14
- Stats at Baseball Reference

Teams
- Detroit Tigers (2015)

Ángel Ladimir Nesbitt (born December 4, 1990) is a Venezuelan former professional baseball pitcher. He has previously played in Major League Baseball (MLB) for the Detroit Tigers.

== Career ==
=== Detroit Tigers ===
Nesbitt was signed by the Detroit Tigers as an international free agent in April 2009. He made his professional debut that year with the VSL Tigers of the Venezuelan Summer League, playing for them until 2011. He spent 2012 with the Connecticut Tigers and 2013 with the West Michigan Whitecaps. In 2014, he pitched for the Lakeland Flying Tigers and Erie SeaWolves, combining for a 1.48 ERA and 20 saves in 48 games. He was added to the Tigers 40-man roster on November 20, 2014.

Despite having never pitched above Double-A in his minor league career, Nesbitt made the Tigers' Opening Day roster out of spring training in 2015. He made his Major league debut on April 8, retiring the only batter he faced, and earned his first win on May 12. On June 13, after conceding runs in five of his previous six appearances, Nesbitt was optioned to the Triple-A Toledo Mud Hens. In 24 games with Detroit, Nesbitt pitched to a 5.40 ERA, striking out 14 in 21.2 innings pitched. Nesbitt struggled in Toledo as well, pitching to a 6.25 ERA with 30 strikeouts and 21 walks in 40.1 innings pitched, and as a result, wasn't recalled to Detroit when the rosters expanded in September.

Fighting for a spot in the bullpen for 2016, Nesbitt injured his ankle during spring training, and opened the season in May with Lakeland on a rehab assignment before being optioned to Toledo. After pitching to a 6.66 ERA in 20 appearances with Toledo, Nesbitt was demoted back to Erie. Across all three minor league levels in 2016, Nesbitt went 2-2 with a 4.91 ERA, striking out 42 and walking 19 in 47.2 innings pitched.

On December 23, 2016, Nesbitt was designated for assignment, but remained in the organization when he was outrighted on January 6, 2017. In 11 appearances split between the rookie–level Gulf Coast Tigers, Erie, and Toledo, Nesbitt registered a cumulative 6.08 ERA with 16 strikeouts in 13 1/3 innings of work. He elected free agency following the season on November 6.

On November 17, 2017, Nesbitt received a 50–game suspension for PED use. The suspension will be served should he sign with an MiLB or MLB team in the future.

=== Sugar Land Skeeters ===
On June 29, 2018, Nesbitt signed with the Sugar Land Skeeters of the Atlantic League of Professional Baseball. He was released on August 10, 2018.

=== Pericos de Puebla ===
On May 3, 2019, Nesbitt signed with the Pericos de Puebla of the Mexican League. He was released on May 14, 2019.

=== Lexington Legends ===
On February 22, 2022, Nesbitt signed with the Lexington Legends of the Atlantic League of Professional Baseball. However, he made no appearances for the club and became a free agent following the season.

=== Sioux City Explorers ===
On March 5, 2024, Nesbitt signed with the Sioux City Explorers of the American Association of Professional Baseball. Nesbitt did not make an appearance for the club before he was released on June 5.

== See also ==
- List of Major League Baseball players from Venezuela
