= Jeff Ferrell =

American baseball pitcher (born 1990)

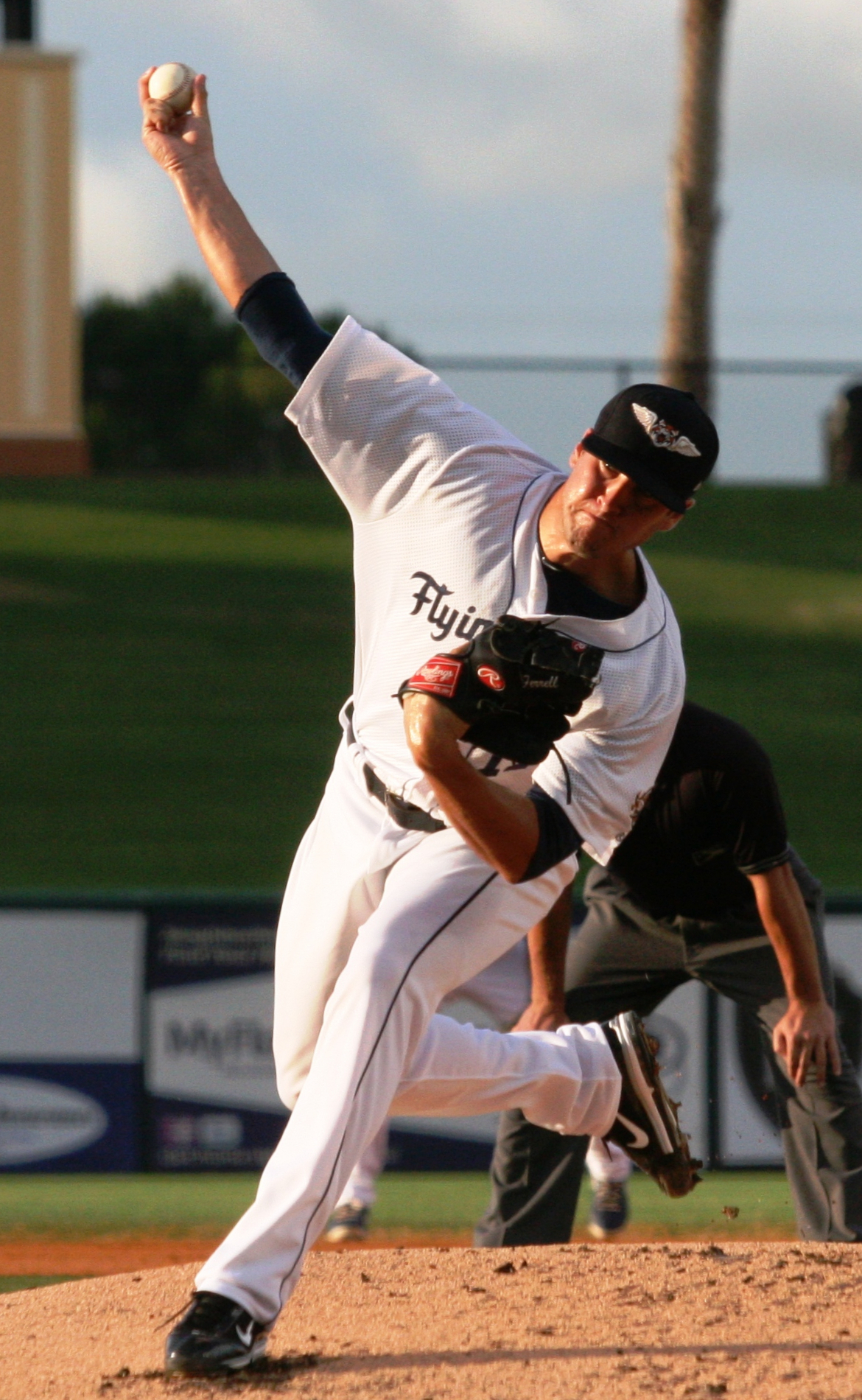
- Ferrell pitching for the Lakeland Flying Tigers in 2013
- Pitcher
- Born: November 23, 1990 (age 34); Charlotte, North Carolina, U.S.
- Batted: Right Threw: Right

MLB debut
- July 4, 2015, for the Detroit Tigers

Last MLB appearance
- September 18, 2017, for the Detroit Tigers

MLB statistics
- Win–loss record: 0–0
- Earned run average: 6.53
- Strikeouts: 12
- Stats at Baseball Reference

Teams
- Detroit Tigers (2015, 2017)

Jeffrey Alan Ferrell (born November 23, 1990) is an American former professional baseball pitcher who played in Major League Baseball (MLB) for the Detroit Tigers in 2015 and 2017.

== Career ==
=== Detroit Tigers ===
Ferrell attended Emsley A. Laney High School in Wilmington, North Carolina, and played collegiately at Pitt Community College. The Detroit Tigers selected Ferrell in the 26th round of the 2010 Major League Baseball draft.

In 2015, Ferrell saved 12 games for the Double-A Erie SeaWolves, while allowing five runs on 21 hits over 27 innings with four walks and 35 strikeouts. He was promoted to the Triple-A Toledo Mud Hens on June 29, earning the save in his debut for the Mud Hens.

Ferrell was called up to the major leagues by the Tigers on July 3, 2015. He made his major league debut on July 4 against the Toronto Blue Jays, pitching one inning, allowing two hits, and two earned runs. In his rookie campaign, Ferrell compiled a 6.35 ERA with 6 strikeouts over 9 games.

Ferrell began the 2016 campaign in the minors, but made tossed only 11 1/3 innings between Toledo and the High–A Lakeland Flying Tigers before suffering an injury. He was designated for assignment following the acquisition of Donn Roach on August 9. Ferrell was released on August 15. On September 1, he re–signed with Detroit on a minor league contract, but did not make another appearance on the season.

On August 13, 2017, the Tigers purchased Ferrell's contract after designating Edward Mujica for assignment. In 11 appearances for the Tigers, he struggled to a 6.75 ERA with 6 strikeouts across 9 1/3 innings pitched. Ferrell was removed from the 40-man roster and sent outright to Triple–A on November 2. He elected free agency following the season on November 6.

=== Baltimore Orioles ===
On November 28, 2017, Ferrell signed a minor league contract with the Baltimore Orioles organization. He was released on March 29, 2018.
