= Al Avila =

Cuban baseball executive

- Born: August 2, 1958 (age 68); Havana, Cuba
- Education: St. Thomas University
- Occupation: General manager
- Spouse: Yamile Avila
- Children: Alex Avila; Alan Avila; Annelisa Marie Avila

Al Avila (born August 2, 1958) is a Cuban-American baseball executive. He was the executive vice president of baseball operations and general manager of the Detroit Tigers of Major League Baseball (MLB).

== Early life ==
Avila was born in Cuba. His family defected to the United States when he was a child.

== Career ==
=== St. Thomas University ===
Avila was the assistant baseball coach to Paul Mainieri at St. Thomas University, his alma mater, in 1988. The following season he was promoted to coach when Mainieri left for the Air Force Academy. Avila remained in that position, and also served as the school's athletics director, until he joined the expansion Florida Marlins' front office in 1992.

=== Florida Marlins ===
In June 1992, Avila joined the Florida Marlins as the assistant director of Latin American operations. After two seasons with the Marlins, he was promoted to director of Latin American operations. Under Avila's guidance, the Marlins signed 1997 NLCS and World Series MVP Liván Hernández, during Florida's first World Series run.

Avila was named director of scouting for the Marlins in July 1998, where he was responsible for all of the Marlins scouting efforts on both the national and international levels and he oversaw the development of those players in the baseball academies in the Dominican Republic and Venezuela. Avila helped sign 16-year-old Miguel Cabrera in 1999, who debuted in the major leagues in 2003 and hit four home runs during Florida's second World Series run.

Avila served as the interim general manager for the Marlins during the 2001 off-season following Dave Dombrowski's departure to the Detroit Tigers. He was named the Marlins vice president and assistant general manager in July 2001.

=== Pittsburgh Pirates ===
On January 23, 2002, Avila was hired as a special assistant to Pittsburgh Pirates general manager Dave Littlefield.

=== Detroit Tigers ===
On April 15, 2002, Avila was named the assistant general manager and vice president of the Detroit Tigers.

On August 4, 2015, Avila was promoted to general manager and executive vice president of baseball operations, after Dombrowski was released by the Tigers. Avila became the first Cuban-born general manager in baseball history. On July 5, 2019, the Tigers announced they signed Avila to a multi-year contract extension.

On August 10, 2022, the Tigers fired Avila. At the time of his firing, Avila was the only general manager of Latin American descent in Major League Baseball.

== Personal ==
His father, Ralph Avila, was the vice president of the Los Angeles Dodgers, and was the senior scouting advisor for the Dodgers. His son, Alex Avila, was a catcher for various teams the major leagues and is now an analyst for MLB Network.

Sporting positions
Preceded by Dave Dombrowski	Detroit Tigers general manager 2015–2022	Succeeded by TBD
