= 2015 Oakland Athletics season =

2015 Oakland Athletics
- League: American League
- Division: West
- Ballpark: O.co Coliseum
- City: Oakland, California
- Record: 68–94 (.420)
- Divisional place: 5th
- Owners: Lewis Wolff, John Fisher
- General managers: Billy Beane
- Managers: Bob Melvin
- Television: Comcast SportsNet California; KOFY-TV (Glen Kuiper, Ray Fosse, Eric Chavez, Kelli Johnson)
- Radio: KGMZ (Ken Korach, Vince Cotroneo, Ray Fosse, Roxy Bernstein, Amaury Pi-González, Manolo Hernández-Douen)

The 2015 Oakland Athletics season was the 48th for the franchise in Oakland, as well as the 115th in club history.

== Offseason ==
On November 28, 2014, the Athletics traded Josh Donaldson to the Toronto Blue Jays for Brett Lawrie, Kendall Graveman, Sean Nolin, and Franklin Barreto.

== Regular season ==
=== American League West ===
AL West
Team	W	L	Pct.	GB	Home	Road
Texas Rangers	88	74	.543	—	43‍–‍38	45‍–‍36
Houston Astros	86	76	.531	2	53‍–‍28	33‍–‍48
Los Angeles Angels	85	77	.525	3	49‍–‍32	36‍–‍45
Seattle Mariners	76	86	.469	12	36‍–‍45	40‍–‍41
Oakland Athletics	68	94	.420	20	34‍–‍47	34‍–‍47

=== American League Wild Card ===
Division leaders
Team	W	L	Pct.
Kansas City Royals	95	67	.586
Toronto Blue Jays	93	69	.574
Texas Rangers	88	74	.543

Wild Card teams (Top 2 teams qualify for postseason)
Team	W	L	Pct.	GB
New York Yankees	87	75	.537	+1
Houston Astros	86	76	.531	—
Los Angeles Angels	85	77	.525	1
Minnesota Twins	83	79	.512	3
Cleveland Indians	81	80	.503	4½
Baltimore Orioles	81	81	.500	5
Tampa Bay Rays	80	82	.494	6
Boston Red Sox	78	84	.481	8
Chicago White Sox	76	86	.469	10
Seattle Mariners	76	86	.469	10
Detroit Tigers	74	87	.460	11½
Oakland Athletics	68	94	.420	18

=== Record against opponents ===
2015 American League record Source: MLB Standings Grid – 2015
Team	BAL	BOS	CWS	CLE	DET	HOU	KC	LAA	MIN	NYY	OAK	SEA	TB	TEX	TOR	NL
Baltimore	—	11–8	3–3	5–1	4–3	3–4	3–4	2–4	0–7	10–9	6–1	3–3	10–9	1–6	8–11	12–8
Boston	8–11	—	3–4	2–4	4–2	2–4	4–3	2–5	2–5	8–11	5–1	4–3	9–10	2–5	10–9	13–7
Chicago	3–3	4–3	—	10–9	9–10	5–1	7–12	4–3	6–13	2–5	5–2	4–3	1–5	3–3	4–3	9–11
Cleveland	1–5	4–2	9–10	—	7–11	5–2	9–10	4–2	7–12	5–2	3–4	4–3	5–2	3–3	3–4	12–8
Detroit	3–4	2–4	10–9	11–7	—	3–4	9–10	1–6	11–8	2–5	2–4	4–3	3–3	2–5	2–4	9–11
Houston	4–3	4–2	1–5	2–5	4–3	—	4–2	10–9	3–3	4–3	10–9	12–7	2–5	6–13	4–3	16–4
Kansas City	4–3	3–4	12–7	10–9	10–9	2–4	—	6–1	12–7	2–4	5–1	4–2	6–1	3–4	3–4	13–7
Los Angeles	4–2	5–2	3–4	2–4	6–1	9–10	1–6	—	5–2	2–4	11–8	12–7	3–3	12–7	2–5	8–12
Minnesota	7–0	5–2	13–6	12–7	8–11	3–3	7–12	2–5	—	1–5	4–3	4–3	4–2	3–3	2–5	8–12
New York	9–10	11–8	5–2	2–5	5–2	3–4	4–2	4–2	5–1	—	3–4	5–1	12–7	2–5	6–13	11–9
Oakland	1–6	1–5	2–5	4–3	4–2	9–10	1–5	8–11	3–4	4–3	—	6–13	3–4	10–9	1–5	11–9
Seattle	3–3	3–4	3–4	3–4	3–4	7–12	2–4	7–12	3–4	1–5	13–6	—	4–3	12–7	4–2	8–12
Tampa Bay	9–10	10–9	5–1	2–5	3–3	5–2	1–6	3–3	2–4	7–12	4–3	3–4	—	2–5	10–9	14–6
Texas	6–1	5–2	3–3	3–3	5–2	13–6	4–3	7–12	3–3	5–2	9–10	7–12	5–2	—	2–4	11–9
Toronto	11–8	9–10	3–4	4–3	4–2	3–4	4–3	5–2	5–2	13–6	5–1	2–4	9–10	4–2	—	12–8

=== Game log ===
2015 Game Log
Total: 68–94 (Home: 34–47; Away: 34–47)
April: 9–14 (Home: 4–9; Away: 5–5)

#	Date	Opponent	Score	Win	Loss	Save	Attendance	Record
1	April 6	Rangers	8–0	**Gray** (1–0)	Gallardo (0–1)	—	36,067	1–0
2	April 7	Rangers	1–3	Lewis (1–0)	**Hahn** (0–1)	Feliz (1)	15,025	1–1
3	April 8	Rangers	10–0	**Kazmir** (1–0)	Detwiler (0–1)	—	19,479	2–1
4	April 9	Rangers	1–10	Martinez (1–0)	**Graveman** (0–1)	—	16,045	2–2
5	April 10	Mariners	12–0	**Pomeranz** (1–0)	Walker (0–1)	—	30,114	3–2
6	April 11	Mariners	4–5 (11)	Olson (1–0)	**Abad** (0–1)	Rodney (2)	24,355	3–3
7	April 12	Mariners	7–8 (10)	Rodney (1–0)	**Clippard** (0–1)	Medina (1)	32,282	3–4
8	April 13	@ Astros	8–1	**Kazmir** (2–0)	Feldman (0–2)	—	19,279	4–4
9	April 14	@ Astros	4–0	**Graveman** (1–1)	Peacock (0–1)	—	18,395	5–4
10	April 15	@ Astros	1–6	McHugh (2–0)	**Pomeranz** (1–1)	–	19,777	5–5
11	April 17	@ Royals	4–6	Davis (2–0)	**Otero** (0–1)	Holland (4)	39,228	5–6
12	April 18	@ Royals	5–0	**Hahn** (1–1)	Ventura (2–1)	**Chavez** (1)	33,151	6–6
13	April 19	@ Royals	2–4	Morales (1–0)	**O'Flaherty** (0–1)	Davis (2)	36,755	6–7
14	April 20	@ Angels	6–3	**Otero** (1–1)	Shoemaker (2–1)	**Clippard** (1)	35,228	7–7
15	April 21	@ Angels	1–14	Santiago (2–1)	**Pomeranz** (1–2)	—	32,137	7–8
16	April 22	@ Angels	9–2	**Gray** (2–0)	Salas (0–1)	—	30,034	8–8
17	April 23	@ Angels	0–2	Tropeano (1–0)	**Chavez** (0–1)	Street (5)	24,304	8–9
18	April 24	Astros	4–5 (11)	Gregerson (1–0)	**O'Flaherty** (0–2)	Qualls (2)	18,205	8–10
19	April 25	Astros	3–9	Feldman (2–2)	**Graveman** (1–2)	—	24,342	8–11
20	April 26	Astros	6–7	Sipp (2–0)	**Clippard** (0–2)	Gregerson (4)	22,080	8–12
21	April 28	Angels	6–2	**Gray** (3–0)	Weaver (0–3)	—	17,674	9–12
22	April 29	Angels	3–6	Morin (1–0)	**Cook** (0–1)	Street (8)	16,212	9–13
23	April 30	Angels	5–6	Richards (2–1)	**Chavez** (0–2)	Street (9)	19,534	9–14

May: 11–19 (Home: 5–8; Away: 6–11)

#	Date	Opponent	Score	Win	Loss	Save	Attendance	Record
24	May 1	@ Rangers	7–5	**Otero** (2–1)	Mendez (0–1)	**Clippard** (2)	29,700	10–14
25	May 2	@ Rangers	7–8 (10)	Kela (1–1)	**Cook** (0–2)	—	32,207	10–15
26	May 3	@ Rangers	7–1	**Gray** (4–0)	Gallardo (2–4)	—	36,006	11–15
27	May 4	@ Twins	7–8	Hughes (1–4)	**Hahn** (1–2)	Perkins (9)	20,605	11–16
28	May 5	@ Twins	2–1	**Chavez** (1–2)	May (2–2)	**Clippard** (3)	18,135	12–16
29	May 6	@ Twins	0–13	Gibson (3–2)	**Kazmir** (2–1)	—	18,866	12–17
30	May 7	@ Twins	5–6	Nolasco (2–1)	**Pomeranz** (1–3)	Perkins (10)	22,379	12–18
31	May 8	@ Mariners	3–4 (11)	Smith (1–2)	**Otero** (2–2)	—	25,187	12–19
32	May 9	@ Mariners	2–7	Happ (3–1)	**Hahn** (1–3)	—	37,441	12–20
33	May 10	@ Mariners	3–4	Hernández (6–0)	**Chavez** (1–3)	Rodney (9)	42,831	12–21
34	May 11	Red Sox	4–5 (11)	Barnes (1–0)	**Castro** (0–1)	—	19,743	12–22
35	May 12	Red Sox	9–2	**Pomeranz** (2–3)	Masterson (2–2)	—	24,605	13–22
36	May 13	Red Sox	0–2	Miley (2–4)	**Gray** (4–1)	Uehara (7)	22,389	13–23
37	May 15	White Sox	6–7	Carroll (1–1)	**Abad** (0–2)	Duke (1)	21,464	13–24
38	May 16	White Sox	3–4	Danks (2–3)	**Rodriguez** (0–1)	Robertson (8)	28,445	13–25
39	May 17	White Sox	3–7	Samardzija (3–2)	**Kazmir** (2–2)	—	33,195	13–26
40	May 18	@ Astros	2–1	**Mujica** (2–1)	Thatcher (0–1)	**Clippard** (4)	21,724	14–26
41	May 19	@ Astros	4–6	Hernández (2–3)	**Gray** (4–2)	Neshek (1)	17,575	14–27
42	May 20	@ Astros	1–6	Keuchel (6–0)	**Hahn** (1–4)	—	21,066	14–28
43	May 21	@ Rays	0–3	Colomé (3–1)	**Chavez** (1–4)	Boxberger (12)	10,605	14–29
44	May 22	@ Rays	2–5	Archer (5–4)	**Kazmir** (2–3)	Boxberger (13)	12,329	14–30
45	May 23	@ Rays	5–0	**Graveman** (2–2)	Karns (3–2)	—	15,207	15–30
46	May 24	@ Rays	7–2	**Gray** (5–2)	Ramírez (2–2)	—	15,692	16–30
47	May 25	Tigers	4–0	**Hahn** (2–4)	Greene (4–3)	—	25,380	17–30
48	May 26	Tigers	0–1	Price (4–1)	**Chavez** (1–5)	Soria (14)	22,758	17–31
49	May 27	Tigers	2–3	Ryan (1–0)	**Otero** (2–3)	Soria (15)	20,387	17–32
50	May 28	Yankees	5–4	**Scribner** (1–0)	Sabathia (2–7)	**Clippard** (5)	21,795	18–32
51	May 29	Yankees	6–2	**Gray** (6–2)	Capuano (0–3)	**Clippard** (6)	23,540	19–32
52	May 30	Yankees	3–5	Shreve (2–1)	**Hahn** (2–5)	Miller (15)	25,223	19–33
53	May 31	Yankees	3–0	**Chavez** (2–5)	Warren (3–4)	**Clippard** (7)	25,457	20–33

June: 15–12 (Home: 6–7; Away: 9–5)

#	Date	Opponent	Score	Win	Loss	Save	Attendance	Record
54	June 2	@ Tigers	5–3	**Graveman** (3–2)	Simón (5–3)	**Clippard** (8)	28,362	21–33
55	June 3	@ Tigers	6–1	**Gray** (7–2)	Sánchez (3–7)	—	30,718	22–33
56	June 4	@ Tigers	7–5	**Hahn** (3–5)	Greene (4–5)	**Clippard** (9)	37,411	23–33
57	June 5	@ Red Sox	2–4	Miley (5–5)	**Kazmir** (2–4)	Uehara (12)	34,910	23–34
58	June 6	@ Red Sox	2–4	Kelly (2–4)	**Chavez** (2–6)	Uehara (13)	36,713	23–35
59	June 7	@ Red Sox	4–7	Wright (3–2)	**Clippard** (0–3)	Layne (1)	36,913	23–36
60	June 9	Rangers	1–2	Martinez (5–2)	**Gray** (7–3)	Tolleson (8)	14,617	23–37
61	June 10	Rangers	5–4	**Clippard** (1–3)	Kela (4–3)	—	14,290	24–37
62	June 11	Rangers	7–0	**Kazmir** (3–4)	Gonzalez (2–1)	—	14,489	25–37
63	June 12	@ Angels	4–5	Alvarez (1–1)	**Scribner** (1–1)	Street (18)	42,113	25–38
64	June 13	@ Angels	0–1	Wilson (4–5)	**Graveman** (3–3)	Street (19)	43,540	25–39
65	June 14	@ Angels	8–1	**Gray** (8–3)	Shoemaker (4–5)	—	35,143	26–39
66	June 15	@ Padres	9–1	**Hahn** (4–5)	Ross (3–7)	—	30,018	27–39
67	June 16	@ Padres	6–5	**Scribner** (2–1)	Kimbrel (1–2)	**Clippard** (10)	28,482	28–39
68	June 17	Padres	16–2	**Chavez** (3–6)	Despaigne (3–5)	—	20,625	29–39
69	June 18	Padres	1–3	Kennedy (4–5)	**Graveman** (3–4)	Kimbrel (17)	16,643	29–40
70	June 19	Angels	7–12	Salas (1–1)	**Mujica** (2–2)	—	25,528	29–41
71	June 20	Angels	4–1	**Hahn** (5–5)	Weaver (4–8)	**Clippard** (11)	26,471	30–41
72	June 21	Angels	3–2	**Kazmir** (4–4)	Richards (7–5)	**Clippard** (12)	29,137	31–41
73	June 23	@ Rangers	8–6	**Chavez** (4–6)	Gonzalez (2–2)	**Pomeranz** (1)	35,889	32–41
74	June 24	@ Rangers	8–2	**Graveman** (4–4)	Rodríguez (4–3)	—	34,216	33–41
75	June 25	@ Rangers	6–3	**Gray** (9–3)	Kela (4–5)	**Clippard** (13)	29,251	34–41
76	June 26	Royals	2–5	Vólquez (8–4)	**Hahn** (5–6)	Holland (15)	27,365	34–42
77	June 27	Royals	2–3	Young (7–3)	**Kazmir** (4–5)	Holland (16)	28,619	34–43
78	June 28	Royals	3–5	Guthrie (6–5)	**Chavez** (4–7)	Davis (9)	22,477	34–44
79	June 29	Rockies	7–1	**Graveman** (5–4)	Hale (2–3)	—	12,125	35–44
80	June 30	Rockies	1–2	de la Rosa (5–3)	**Bassitt** (0–1)	Hawkins (2)	19,206	35–45

July: 10–14 (Home: 6–7; Away: 4–7)

#	Date	Opponent	Score	Win	Loss	Save	Attendance	Record
81	July 1	Rockies	4–1	**Hahn** (6–6)	Bettis (4–3)	**Clippard** (14)	17,655	36–45
82	July 2	Mariners	4–0	**Kazmir** (5–5)	Elias (4–6)	—	13,062	37–45
83	July 3	Mariners	5–9	Happ (4–5)	**Chavez** (4–8)	—	35,067	37–46
84	July 4	Mariners	2–0	**Graveman** (6–4)	Hernández (10–5)	**Clippard** (15)	18,915	38–46
85	July 5	Mariners	1–2	Montgomery (4–2)	**Bassitt** (0–2)	Rodney (16)	22,163	38–47
86	July 7	@ Yankees	4–3	**Pomeranz** (3–3)	Betances (5–2)	**Clippard** (16)	32,337	39–47
87	July 8	@ Yankees	4–5	Sabathia (4–8)	**Scribner** (2–2)	Miller (18)	41,626	39–48
88	July 9	@ Yankees	2–6	Tanaka (5–3)	**Chavez** (4–9)	—	40,084	39–49
89	July 10	@ Indians	1–5	Salazar (8–4)	**Graveman** (6–5)	Allen (19)	28,539	39–50
90	July 11	@ Indians	5–4	**O'Flaherty** (1–2)	McAllister (2–3)	**Clippard** (17)	28,733	40–50
91	July 12	@ Indians	2–0	**Gray** (10–3)	Kluber (4–10)	—	20,611	41–50
–	July 14	86th All-Star Game	National League vs. American League (Great American Ball Park, Cincinnati)					
92	July 17	Twins	0–5	Santana (1–0)	**Gray** (10–4)	—	23,462	41–51
93	July 18	Twins	3–2 (10)	**Pomeranz** (4–3)	Fien (2–4)	—	30,778	42–51
94	July 19	Twins	14–1	**Chavez** (5–9)	Milone (5–2)	—	20,286	43–51
95	July 21	Blue Jays	1–7	Buehrle (11–5)	**Graveman** (6–6)	—	19,364	43–52
96	July 22	Blue Jays	4–3 (10)	**Rodriguez** (1–1)	Osuna (1–4)	—	18,827	44–52
97	July 23	Blue Jays	2–5	Dickey (4–10)	Otero (2–4)	Schultz (1)	19,045	44–53
98	July 24	@ Giants	3–9	Peavy (2–4)	**Chavez** (5–10)	—	42,128	44–54
99	July 25	@ Giants	1–2	Bumgarner (11–5)	**Bassitt** (0–3)	Casilla (25)	42,162	44–55
100	July 26	@ Giants	3–4	Hudson (6–8)	**Graveman** (6–7)	Casilla (26)	42,034	44–56
101	July 28	@ Dodgers	2–0	**Gray** (11–4)	Anderson (5–6)	—	50,182	45–56
102	July 29	@ Dodgers	7–10	Báez (3–2)	**Pomeranz** (4–4)	—	51,788	45–57
103	July 30	Indians	1–3	Carrasco (11–8)	**Bassitt** (0–4)	—	13,173	45–58
104	July 31	Indians	1–2	Salazar (9–6)	**Mujica** (2–3)	Allen (21)	28,152	45–59

August: 13–15 (Home: 10–5; Away: 3–10)

#	Date	Opponent	Score	Win	Loss	Save	Attendance	Record
105	August 1	Indians	5–1	**Brooks** (1–0)	Anderson (2–3)	—	19,046	46–59
106	August 2	Indians	2–1 (10)	**Rodriguez** (2–1)	Allen (1–3)	—	21,498	47–59
107	August 3	Orioles	2–9	Wilson (2–1)	**Chavez** (5–11)	—	11,476	47–60
108	August 4	Orioles	5–0	**Bassitt** (1–4)	González (9–8)	—	16,328	48–60
109	August 5	Orioles	3–7	Britton (2–0)	**León** (0–1)	—	20,176	48–61
110	August 6	Astros	4–5 (10)	Gregerson (5–1)	**Mujica** (2–4)	Harris (1)	16,172	48–62
111	August 7	Astros	3–1	**Gray** (12–4)	Keuchel (13–6)	—	18,908	49–62
112	August 8	Astros	2–1	**Chavez** (6–11)	McHugh (13–6)	**Mujica** (1)	25,091	50–62
113	August 9	Astros	5–4	**Abad** (1–2)	Gregerson (5–2)	—	20,278	51–62
114	August 11	@ Blue Jays	2–4	Hutchison (11–2)	**Graveman** (6–8)	Osuna (11)	39,381	51–63
115	August 12	@ Blue Jays	3–10	Dickey (7–10)	**Brooks** (1–1)	—	44,597	51–64
116	August 13	@ Blue Jays	2–4	Burhrle (13–5)	**Chavez** (6–12)	Osuna (12)	46,902	51–65
117	August 14	@ Orioles	6–8 (13)	Garcia (1–0)	**Pomeranz** (4–5)	—	36,784	51–66
118	August 15	@ Orioles	3–4	Britton (3–0)	**Venditte** (0–1)	—	44,028	51–67
119	August 16	@ Orioles	2–18	Chen (7–6)	**Graveman** (6–9)	—	28,228	51–68
120	August 17	@ Orioles	2–4	Tillman (9–7)	**Gray** (12–5)	Britton (29)	22,766	51–69
121	August 18	Dodgers	5–4 (10)	**Abad** (2–2)	García (3–3)	—	35,067	52–69
122	August 19	Dodgers	5–2	**Chavez** (7–12)	Wood (8–8)	**Pomeranz** (2)	26,122	53–69
123	August 21	Rays	1–2	Smyly (1–2)	**Bassitt** (1–5)	Boxberger (30)	20,671	53–70
124	August 22	Rays	4–5	Colomé (6–4)	**Venditte** (0–2)	—	36,067	53–71
125	August 23	Rays	8–2	**Rodriguez** (3–1)	Geltz (2–5)	—	19,425	54–71
126	August 24	@ Mariners	11–5	**Mujica** (3–4)	Iwakuma (5–3)	—	17,970	55–71
127	August 25	@ Mariners	5–6	Olmos (1–0)	**Chavez** (7–13)	Wilhelmsen (4)	17,498	55–72
128	August 26	@ Mariners	2–8	Hernández (15–8)	**Bassitt** (1–6)	—	23,338	55–73
129	August 28	@ Diamondbacks	4–6	Delgado (5–3)	**Gray** (12–6)	Ziegler (24)	30,059	55–74
130	August 29	@ Diamondbacks	3–2	**Rodriguez** (4–1)	Chafin (5–1)	**Pomeranz** (3)	35,990	56–74
131	August 30	@ Diamondbacks	7–4 (11)	**Venditte** (1–2)	Ziegler (0–2)	—	29,576	57–74
132	August 31	Angels	11–5	**Doubront** (2–1)	Santiago (7–9)	—	12,054	58–74

September: 8–19 (Home: 3–11; Away: 4–6 )

#	Date	Opponent	Score	Win	Loss	Save	Attendance	Record
133	September 1	Angels	2–6	Shoemaker (7–9)	**Martin** (2–4)	—	14,178	58–75
134	September 2	Angels	4–9	Heaney (6–2)	**Gray** (12–7)	—	13,392	58–76
135	September 4	Mariners	8–11	Ramírez (1–0)	**Brooks** (1–2)	Wilhelmsen (9)	16,382	58–77
136	September 5	Mariners	3–8	Hernández (16–8)	**Chavez** (7–14)	—	27,387	58–78
137	September 6	Mariners	2–3	Iwakuma (7–3)	**Nolin** (0–1)	Wilhelmsen (10)	19,534	58–79
138	September 7	Astros	10–9	**Doubront** (3–1)	Fiers (7–10)	**Doolittle** (1)	22,214	59–79
139	September 8	Astros	4–0	**Gray** (13–7)	Kazmir (7–10)	—	11,364	60–79
140	September 9	Astros	5–11	McHugh (16–7)	**Brooks** (1–3)	—	13,387	60–80
141	September 11	@ Rangers	0–4	Lewis (15–8)	**Chavez** (7–15)	—	28,133	60–81
142	September 12	@ Rangers	5–3	**Nolin** (1–1)	Gallardo (12–10)	—	30,487	61–81
143	September 13	@ Rangers	4–12	Gonzalez (3–5)	**Doubront** (3–2)	—	26,131	61–82
144	September 14	@ White Sox	7–8 (14)	Jennings (2–3)	**León** (0–2)	—	12,221	61–83
145	September 15	@ White Sox	17–6	**Brooks** (2–3)	Samardzija (9–13)	—	12,446	62–83
146	September 16	@ White Sox	4–9	Johnson (2–0)	**Martin** (2–5)	—	13,005	62–84
147	September 17	@ White Sox	4–2	**Doolittle** (1–0)	Robertson (6–4)	—	12,406	63–84
148	September 18	@ Astros	4–3	**Pomeranz** (5–5)	Neshek (3–6)	**Dull** (1)	27,567	64–84
149	September 19	@ Astros	6–10	Qualls (3–4)	**Rodriguez** (4–2)	—	27,044	64–85
150	September 20	@ Astros	1–5	McHugh (17–7)	**Brooks** (2–4)	—	22,453	64–86
151	September 22	Rangers	6–8	Gonzalez (4–5)	**Pomeranz** (5–6)	Tolleson (33)	16,524	64–87
152	September 23	Rangers	3–10	Lewis (17–8)	**Doubront** (3–3)	—	16,445	64–88
153	September 24	Rangers	1–8	Hamels (11–8)	**Bassitt** (1–7)	—	14,452	64–89
154	September 25	Giants	5–4	**Gray** (14–7)	Leake (10–10)	**Doolittle** (2)	36,067	65–89
155	September 26	Giants	10–14	Osich (2–0)	**Dull** (0–1)	Casilla (36)	36,067	65–90
156	September 27	Giants	4–5	Heston (12–10)	**Nolin** (1–2)	Casilla (37)	36,067	65–91
157	September 28	@ Angels	4–5	Gott (4–2)	**Mujica** (3–5)	—	31,858	65–92
158	September 29	@ Angels	1–8	Tropeano (3–2)	**Bassitt** (1–8)	—	33,470	65–93
159	September 30	@ Angels	8–7	**Dull** (1–1)	Morin (3–2)	**Doolittle** (3)	34,033	66–93

October: 2–1 (Home: 0–0; Away: 2–1 )

#	Date	Opponent	Score	Win	Loss	Save	Attendance	Record
160	October 2	@ Mariners	4–2	**Brooks** (3–4)	Farquhar (1–8)	**Doolittle** (4)	26,130	67–93
161	October 3	@ Mariners	7–5 (13)	**Venditte** (2–2)	Ramírez (1–2)	**Doubront** (1)	24,448	68–93
162	October 4	@ Mariners	2–3	Kensing (2–1)	**Dull** (1–2)	Wilhelmsen (13)	22,402	68–94

Legend: = Win = Loss = Postponement
Bold = Athletics team member

== Roster ==
2015 Oakland Athletics
Roster
Pitchers: 56 Fernando Abad; 37 R. J. Alvarez; 40 Chris Bassitt; 36 Aaron Brooks; 44 Ángel Castro; 30 Jesse Chavez; 36 Tyler Clippard; 48 Ryan Cook; 67 Daniel Coulombe; 62 Sean Doolittle; 53 Félix Doubront; 66 Ryan Dull; 31 Kendall Graveman; 54 Sonny Gray; 32 Jesse Hahn; 26 Scott Kazmir; 68 Arnold León; 63 Cody Martin; 48 Brad Mills; 49 Edward Mujica; 47 Sean Nolin; 39 Eric O'Flaherty; 61 Dan Otero; 13 Drew Pomeranz; 33 Fernando Rodriguez; 58 Evan Scribner; 63 Chad Smith; 29 Pat Venditte; 75 Barry Zito	Catchers: 45 Bryan Anderson; 39 Carson Blair; 19 Josh Phegley; 21 Stephen Vogt; Infielders: 16 Billy Butler; 20 Mark Canha; 17 Ike Davis; 15 Brett Lawrie; 50 Max Muncy; 12 Andy Parrino; 10 Marcus Semien; 28 Eric Sogard; 26 Danny Valencia; 21 Stephen Vogt; 18 Ben Zobrist	Outfielders: 1 Billy Burns; 4 Coco Crisp; 23 Sam Fuld; 3 Craig Gentry; 25 Tyler Ladendorf; 7 Jason Pridie; 22 Josh Reddick; 7 Cody Ross; 5 Jake Smolinski	Manager: 6 Bob Melvin; Coaches: 14 Mike Aldrete (bench); 51 Darren Bush (hitting); 65 Scott Emerson (bullpen); 59 Marcus Jensen (assistant hitting); 46 Tye Waller (first base); 38 Ron Washington (third base); 41 Curt Young (pitching)

== Statistics ==
=== Batting ===
Note: G = Games played; AB = At bats; R = Runs scored; H = Hits; 2B = Doubles; 3B = Triples; HR = Home runs; RBI = Runs batted in; BB = Base on balls; SO = Strikeouts; AVG = Batting average; SB = Stolen bases

Player	G	AB	R	H	2B	3B	HR	RBI	BB	SO	AVG	SB
Bryan Anderson, C	4	5	0	2	0	0	0	1	1	1	.400	0
Chris Bassitt, P	18	2	0	0	0	0	0	0	0	1	.000	0
Carson Blair, C	11	31	3	4	0	0	1	3	4	18	.129	0
Aaron Brooks, P	11	2	0	0	0	0	0	0	0	0	.000	0
Billy Burns, CF	125	520	70	153	18	9	5	42	26	81	.294	26
Billy Butler, DH, 1B	151	538	63	135	28	1	15	65	52	101	.251	0
Mark Canha, LF	124	441	61	112	22	3	16	70	33	96	.254	7
Jesse Chavez, P	30	3	0	1	0	0	0	0	0	2	.333	0
Coco Crisp, LF	44	126	11	22	6	0	0	6	13	25	.175	2
Ike Davis, 1B	74	214	19	49	17	0	3	20	23	44	.229	0
Sam Fuld, OF	120	290	34	57	16	3	2	22	30	55	.197	9
Craig Gentry, OF	26	50	6	6	0	2	0	3	4	15	.120	1
Sonny Gray, P	31	6	0	1	0	0	0	0	0	4	.167	0
Jess Hahn, P	16	3	0	0	0	0	0	0	0	2	.000	0
Scott Kazmir, P	18	2	1	1	0	0	0	1	0	1	.500	0
Tyler Ladendorf, 2B, OF	9	17	3	4	0	1	0	2	1	2	.235	0
Brett Lawrie, 3B	149	562	64	146	29	3	16	60	28	144	.260	5
Max Muncy, 1B, 3B	45	102	14	21	8	1	3	9	9	31	.206	0
Andy Parrino, SS, 3B	17	6	1	0	0	0	0	0	2	5	.000	0
Josh Phegley, C	73	225	27	56	16	1	9	34	14	51	.249	0
Jason Pridie, OF	6	9	0	0	0	0	0	0	1	4	.000	0
Josh Reddick, RF	149	526	67	143	25	4	20	77	49	65	.272	10
Cody Ross, OF	9	22	3	2	0	0	0	3	3	6	.091	0
Marcus Semien, SS	155	556	65	143	23	7	15	45	42	132	.257	11
Jake Smolinski, LF	41	106	12	24	6	2	5	20	8	19	.226	0
Eric Sogard, 2B	120	372	40	92	12	3	1	37	23	50	.247	6
Danny Valencia, 3B, DH	47	183	33	52	10	1	11	37	20	40	.284	0
Pat Venditte, P	26	1	0	0	0	0	0	0	0	1	.000	0
Stephen Vogt, C	136	445	58	116	21	3	18	71	56	97	.261	0
Ben Zobrist, 2B, OF, DH	67	235	39	63	20	2	6	33	33	26	.268	1
Team totals	162	5600	694	1405	277	46	146	661	475	1119	.251	78

=== Pitching ===
Note: W = Wins; L = Losses; ERA = Earned run average; G = Games pitched; GS = Games started; SV = Saves; IP = Innings pitched; H = Hits allowed; R = Runs allowed; ER = Earned runs allowed; HR = Home runs allowed; BB = Walks allowed; K = Strikeouts

Player	W	L	ERA	G	GS	SV	IP	H	R	ER	HR	BB	K
Fernando Abad	2	2	4.15	62	0	0	47.2	45	23	22	11	19	45
R. J. Alvarez	0	0	9.90	21	0	0	20.0	27	23	22	7	13	23
Chris Bassitt	1	8	3.56	18	13	0	86.0	78	36	34	5	30	64
Aaron Brooks	3	4	6.71	11	9	0	51.0	67	38	38	9	14	35
Ángel Castro	0	1	2.25	5	0	0	4.0	8	1	1	1	3	4
Jesse Chavez	7	15	4.18	30	26	1	157.0	164	78	73	18	48	136
Tyler Clippard	1	3	2.79	37	0	17	38.2	25	12	12	3	21	38
Ryan Cook	0	2	10.38	4	0	0	4.1	7	5	5	0	3	3
Daniel Coulombe	0	0	3.52	9	0	0	7.2	8	3	3	0	3	4
Ike Davis	0	0	0.00	2	0	0	2.0	1	0	0	0	1	1
Sean Doolittle	1	0	3.95	12	0	4	13.2	12	6	6	1	5	15
Félix Doubront	2	2	5.81	11	8	1	52.2	55	35	34	9	21	43
Ryan Dull	1	2	4.24	13	0	1	17.0	12	8	8	4	6	16
Kendall Graveman	6	9	4.05	21	21	0	115.2	126	57	52	15	38	77
Sonny Gray	14	7	2.73	31	31	0	208.0	166	71	63	17	59	169
Jesse Hahn	6	6	3.35	16	16	0	96.2	88	46	36	5	25	64
Scott Kazmir	5	5	2.38	18	18	0	109.2	84	35	29	7	35	101
Arnold León	0	2	4.39	19	0	0	26.2	30	14	13	3	9	19
Cody Martin	0	2	14.00	4	2	0	9.0	16	14	14	4	5	3
Brad Mills	0	0	5.40	1	1	0	5.0	7	3	3	1	1	1
Edward Mujica	2	4	4.81	38	0	1	33.2	37	21	18	7	4	22
Sean Nolin	1	2	5.28	6	6	0	29.0	35	19	17	4	12	15
Eric O'Flaherty	1	2	5.91	25	0	0	21.1	29	17	14	1	13	15
Dan Otero	2	4	6.75	41	0	0	46.2	64	35	35	7	6	28
Drew Pomeranz	5	6	3.66	53	9	3	86.0	71	44	35	8	31	82
Fernando Rodriguez	4	2	3.84	56	0	0	58.2	43	27	24	4	24	65
Evan Scribner	2	2	4.35	54	0	0	60.0	58	31	29	14	4	64
Chad Smith	0	0	33.75	2	0	0	1.1	5	5	5	0	3	2
Pat Venditte	2	2	4.40	26	0	0	28.2	22	14	14	3	12	23
Barry Zito	0	0	10.29	3	2	0	7.0	12	8	8	4	6	2
Team totals	68	94	4.14	162	162	28	1444.2	1402	729	664	172	474	1179

== Farm system ==
Level	Team	League	Manager
AAA	Nashville Sounds	Pacific Coast League	Steve Scarsone
AA	Midland RockHounds	Texas League	Ryan Christenson
A-Advanced	Stockton Ports	California League	Rick Magnante
A	Beloit Snappers	Midwest League	Fran Riordan
A-Short Season	Vermont Lake Monsters	New York–Penn League	Aaron Nieckula
Rookie	AZL Athletics	Arizona League	Ruben Escalera
Rookie	DSL Athletics	Dominican Summer League	Carlos Casimiro

LEAGUE CHAMPIONS: Midland
