= Pat Venditte =

American baseball player (born 1985)

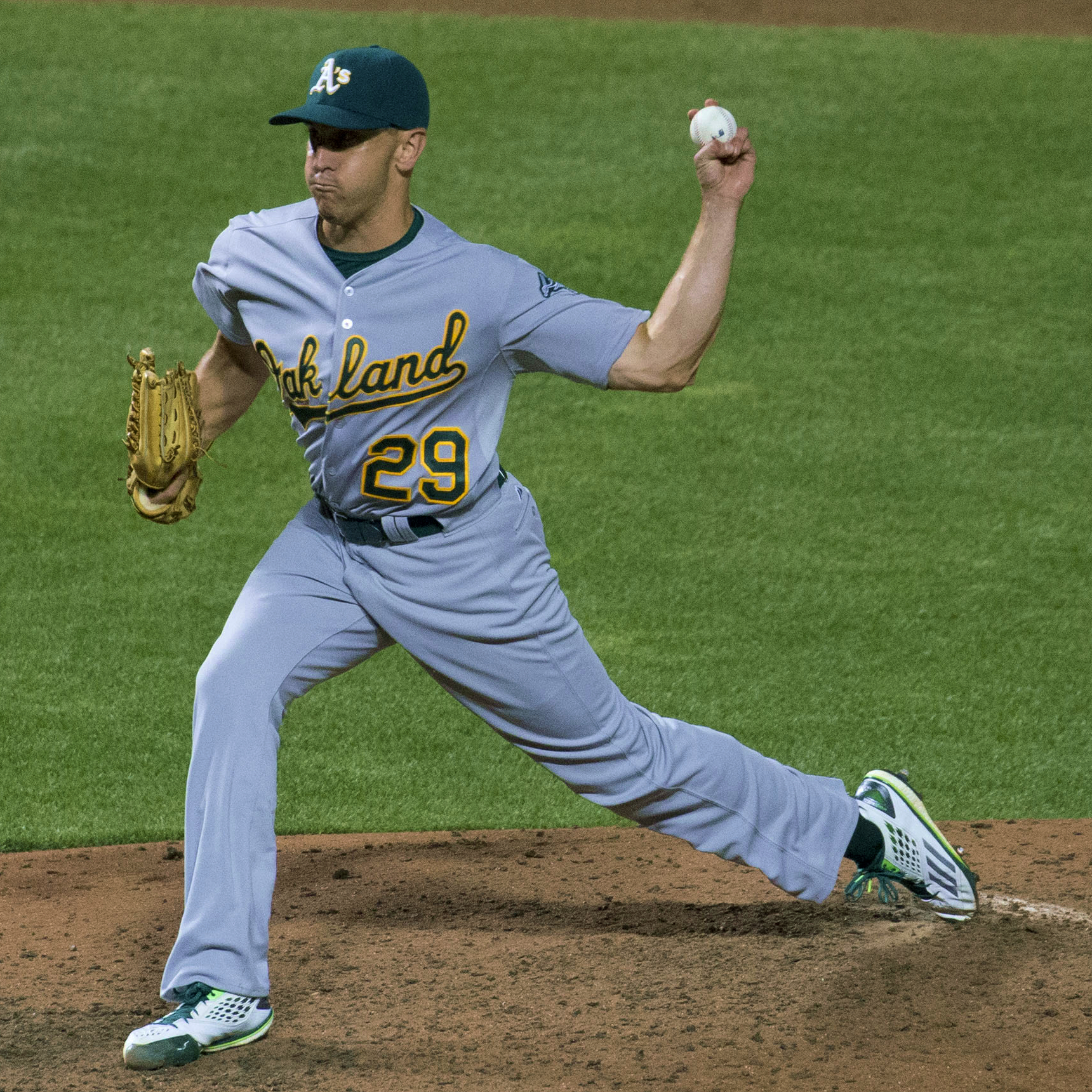
- Venditte pitching left-handed for the Oakland Athletics in 2015
- Relief pitcher
- Born: June 30, 1985 (age 41); Omaha, Nebraska, U.S.
- Batted: Left Threw: Switch

MLB debut
- June 5, 2015, for the Oakland Athletics

Last MLB appearance
- August 18, 2020, for the Miami Marlins

MLB statistics
- Win–loss record: 2–2
- Earned run average: 4.73
- Strikeouts: 58
- Stats at Baseball Reference

Teams
- Oakland Athletics (2015); Toronto Blue Jays (2016); Seattle Mariners (2016); Los Angeles Dodgers (2018); San Francisco Giants (2019); Miami Marlins (2020)

Patrick Michael Venditte Jr. (/vɛnˈdɛti/; born June 30, 1985) is an American former professional baseball pitcher. He played in Major League Baseball (MLB) for the Oakland Athletics, Toronto Blue Jays, Seattle Mariners, Los Angeles Dodgers, San Francisco Giants, and Miami Marlins. After attending Creighton University, Venditte was drafted by the New York Yankees in 2008. He signed with the Athletics as a free agent before the 2015 season and made his MLB debut that year.

Venditte was a switch pitcher, capable of pitching proficiently with both arms. He was recognized as the only professional pitcher who was able to do this. Venditte's rare ability to pitch with either arm required both Major and Minor League Baseball to create a rule for ambidextrous pitchers, known colloquially as the "Pat Venditte Rule". This rule essentially requires any ambidextrous pitcher to declare which hand he will use to pitch to a batter before the at-bat starts and to throw with that hand through the entire at-bat (unless he is injured during the at-bat).

== Early life ==
Venditte was born on June 30, 1985, in Omaha, Nebraska, one of four children of Pat and Janet Venditte. Pat Sr. played college baseball as a catcher. Though Vendite is naturally right-handed, Pat Sr. trained him to throw with both arms to give him an edge in athletic competitions. Toward this end, the family's backyard included astroturf, a batting cage, a radar gun, and a pitching machine. In addition to training both arms from a young age, Venditte practiced punting footballs with both legs to establish the leg motion needed when pitching with each arm.

Venditte used both arms when playing in Little League, which sometimes caused him to be confused for twins. Venditte attended Omaha Central High School. He had a 15–4 win–loss record during his senior year, earning All-Nebraska second-team honors.

== College career ==
Venditte joined the Creighton Bluejays in 2005 as a walk-on. Creighton head coach Ed Servais did not allow Venditte to pitch with both arms during his five appearances his freshman year, fearing the spectacle would become a "circus". Starting with his sophomore season, Venditte regularly used both arms in collegiate play; he posted a 3.02 earned run average (ERA) in 62 2/3 innings pitched. After the season, he played collegiate summer baseball for the Quincy Gems of the Central Illinois Collegiate League.

In his junior year, Venditte appeared in 36 of Creighton's 58 games before appearing in the 2007 NCAA Division I baseball tournament. His opponents batting average (OBA) of .185 was the fourth-best in the nation, and he posted a 1.85 ERA. At one point during the season, Venditte had a streak of 43 2/3 scoreless innings. On May 28, Collegiate Baseball named Venditte the national player of the week.

For the season, Venditte earned first-team All-Conference honors for the Missouri Valley Conference and was named Most Valuable Player of the conference tournament, in which Creighton won its first conference championship. He was named to the All-American third team for the 2007 season. Venditte was also voted Midwest Region Pitcher of the Year by online pitching magazine InsidePitching.com. After the season, he played collegiate summer baseball for the Wisconsin Woodchucks in the Northwoods League. As the Woodchucks' closer, he had a 4–1 record, 9 saves, a 1.76 ERA, and a .154 opponents' batting average.

On June 8, 2007, the New York Yankees selected Venditte in the 45th round of the 2007 Major League Baseball draft with the 1,345th overall pick. Venditte was surprised by the pick, because he had told all major league scouts that he intended to return to Creighton for his senior year. The Yankees called him during the 30th round of the draft, asking him how much it would take to sign him, but Venditte refused to set a price. Ultimately, the Yankees were unable to sign Venditte before the August 15, 2007, signing deadline. Venditte said that he was not quite ready to turn professional and wanted to build velocity with his left arm and add another pitch with his right.

Venditte was once again drafted by the Yankees in the 2008 Major League Baseball draft, this time in the 20th round with the 620th overall pick, and this time, he decided to sign.

== Professional career ==
=== New York Yankees ===
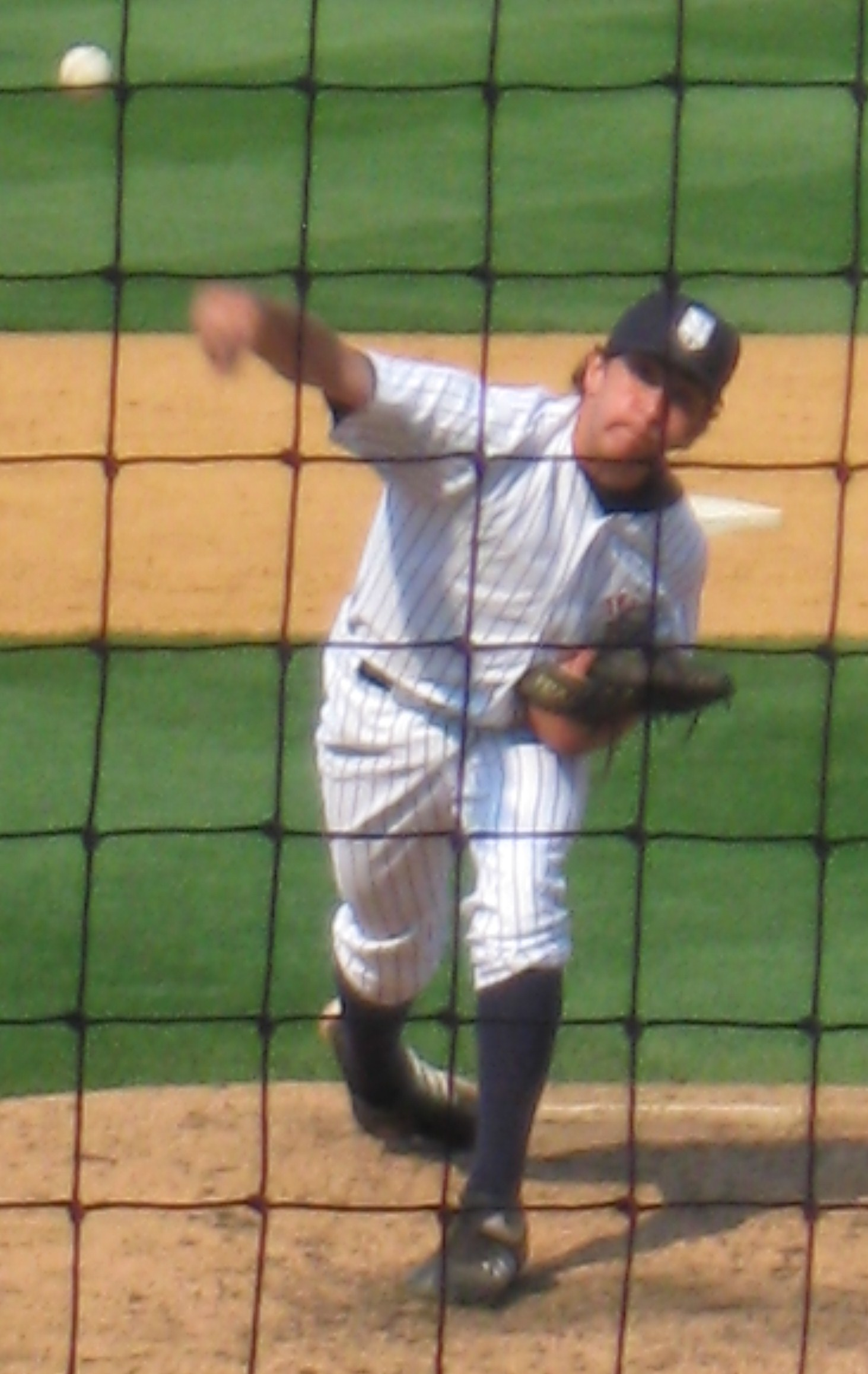
Venditte pitching right-handed for the Staten Island Yankees in 2008

Venditte's initial assignment was to the Staten Island Yankees of the Class-A Short-Season New York–Penn League. On June 19, 2008, in his first minor league appearance with Staten Island facing the Brooklyn Cyclones, Venditte pitched a scoreless ninth inning for a Yankees win. While facing the last Cyclone batter, Ralph Henriquez, a switch-hitter, a rules crisis emerged. When Henriquez chose to bat left- or right-handed, Venditte subsequently chose to pitch with the same hand. Henriquez then went to the other side of the plate to regain the advantage. After this had happened several times, the teams appealed to the umpiring crew, which ruled that the batter must first select from which side of the plate he intended to hit, and that the pitcher would then be allowed to declare with which arm he would pitch. (The Venditte Rule, adopted several weeks later by the umpires' association, would make the opposite determination and preserve the traditional right of a switch-hitter to choose an opposite-handed match-up.) Venditte subsequently struck out Henriquez, who slammed his bat against the dirt, to end the game. A film of the incident received notoriety on the Internet and the tale was recounted in a number of places, including within the baseball compendium Rollie's Follies.

Venditte completed the 2008 season with 23 saves in 30 appearances with a 0.83 ERA. His performance earned him a spot on the New York–Penn League All-Star team and the Minor League Baseball Yearly Award for Best Short-Season Reliever.

Venditte began 2009 with the Charleston RiverDogs of the Class A South Atlantic League. He was promoted to the Tampa Yankees of the Class A-Advanced Florida State League on June 26. He finished the regular season with a 2.21 ERA and 2 saves in 21 appearances. In October, Venditte pitched for Águilas del Zulia in the Venezuelan Winter League.

Venditte pitched for the Yankees in a spring training game against the Atlanta Braves on March 30, 2010, giving up one earned run on two hits and a walk in 1 1/3 innings. He started the 2010 season in Tampa, posting a 1.73 ERA through 72 2/3 innings in 41 appearances. On August 31, Venditte was promoted to the Trenton Thunder of the Class-AA Eastern League.

Venditte pitched to a 3.41 ERA in 51 appearances with Trenton in 2011. Though Venditte was eligible to be selected in the Rule 5 draft during the 2011–12 offseason, the Yankees chose not to protect him. However, he was not chosen by any MLB team. During the 2011–12 offseason, Venditte pitched in the Mexican Pacific League.

Venditte was promoted to the Scranton/Wilkes-Barre Yankees of the Triple-A International League for Opening Day in 2012. He suffered a torn labrum in his right shoulder. He spent most of the 2013 season rehabilitating his shoulder, while also pitching exclusively with his left arm. He pitched for Italy in the 2013 World Baseball Classic and for Trenton in the 2013 postseason. He then pitched in the Mexican Pacific League over the winter, and struggled.

The Yankees did not invite Venditte to spring training in 2014. Though Venditte had excellent minor league numbers, he was not considered a top prospect because of his age and, scouts believed, underwhelming fastball velocity. He started the 2014 season with Trenton, but was called up again to Scranton/Wilkes-Barre after a month, in which he pitched to a 0.82 ERA and 0.73 walks plus hits per inning pitched ratio in 22 innings. In his first outing after the promotion, he struck out all five batters that he faced, three throwing left-handed and two throwing right-handed.

=== Oakland Athletics ===
After the 2014 season, Venditte became a free agent. During the offseason, he signed a minor league contract with the Oakland Athletics, receiving an invitation to spring training in 2015. Venditte began the 2015 season with the Nashville Sounds of the Class AAA Pacific Coast League (PCL). He pitched to a 1.36 ERA with 33 strikeouts in 17 games for Nashville before he was promoted to the Athletics for his first major-league stint on June 5. He pitched two scoreless innings, and got his first strikeout in his major league debut. The East Oregonian, a newspaper published in Pendleton, Oregon, mistakenly described the ambidextrous Venditte's first MLB appearance as "Amphibious Pitcher Makes Debut". The mistake was widely reported humorously in the national popular press. Venditte pitched in four games, not allowing a run in 5 2/3 innings pitched, before he strained his right shoulder and the Athletics placed Venditte on the disabled list on June 12. Venditte was reactivated by the A's on August 3, 2015, and optioned to AAA Nashville. He was recalled to the A's on August 15 and earned his first major league win on August 30. Overall, Venditte posted an ERA of 4.40 in 26 games for Oakland in 2015.

=== Toronto Blue Jays ===
On October 19, 2015, Venditte was claimed off waivers by the Toronto Blue Jays. He was assigned to the Buffalo Bisons of the International League to start the 2016 season, and was recalled by the Blue Jays on April 13 after Arnold León was designated for assignment. Venditte made his Blue Jays debut on April 13, 2016, against the New York Yankees, pitching one scoreless inning to finish a 7–2 Blue Jays win. On April 27, he was optioned back to Triple-A. Venditte was recalled on May 17, and sent back on May 25. On June 7, Venditte was recalled once again. Overall, Venditte posted an ERA of 5.19 in 8 games for Toronto in 2016.

=== Seattle Mariners ===
On August 6, 2016, Venditte was traded to the Seattle Mariners for a player to be named later (Tim Lopes). He was optioned to the Tacoma Rainiers of the PCL on August 6, and was recalled on August 27. The Mariners outrighted removed Venditte off of the 40-man roster to Tacoma after the season.

=== Philadelphia Phillies ===
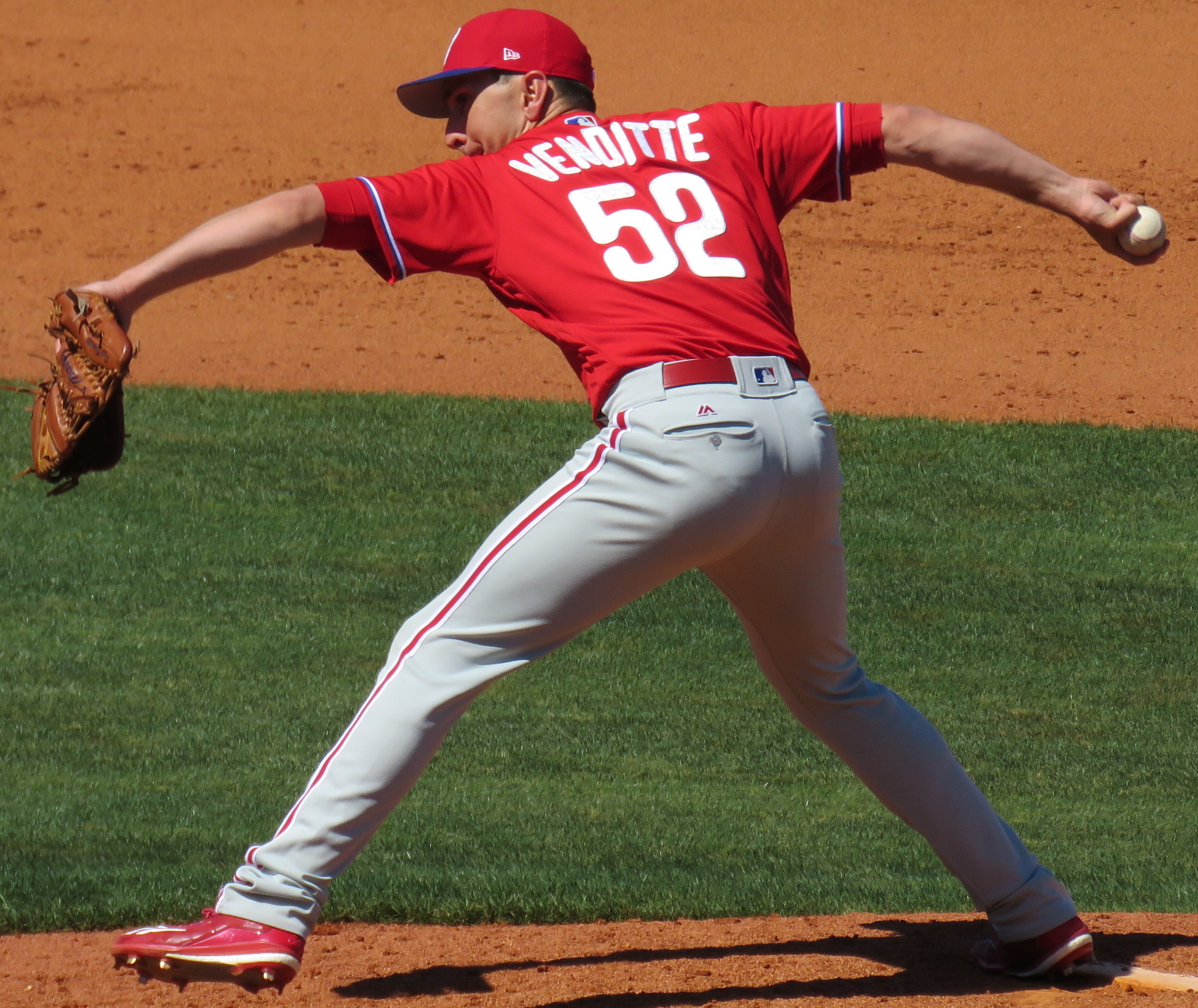
Venditte pitching for the Phillies in 2017

On March 12, 2017, the Mariners traded Venditte to the Philadelphia Phillies in exchange for minor league player Joey Curletta. He spent the 2017 season with the Lehigh Valley IronPigs of the International League, making 52 appearances out of the bullpen and registering a 9–5 record and 3.36 ERA with 69 strikeouts in 69 2/3 innings pitched. Venditte elected free agency following the season on November 6.

=== Los Angeles Dodgers ===
On November 27, 2017, Venditte signed a minor league contract with the Los Angeles Dodgers. After beginning the 2018 season with the Oklahoma City Dodgers of the PCL, he was called up to the majors on May 12. He was selected to represent the PCL at the Triple-A All-Star Game. He was designated for assignment by the Dodgers on November 28.

=== San Francisco Giants ===
Venditte signed a one-year, $585,000 contract with the San Francisco Giants on December 21, 2018. On May 7, 2019, Venditte was placed on waivers, and on May 12, cleared waivers and reported to Sacramento of the Pacific Coast League. He missed almost two months of the season while his wife, Erin, recovered from a brain hemorrhage. He elected free agency on October 4, 2019.

=== Miami Marlins ===
On January 6, 2020, Venditte signed a minor league contract with the Miami Marlins, with an invitation to spring training. Venditte elected free agency on July 14, 2020. He re-signed a minor league deal on August 5, 2020. His contract was selected by the Marlins on August 8, 2020. He appeared in three games for the Marlins that year and pitched 4 1/3 scoreless innings. Venditte was outrighted off of the 40-man roster on October 29, 2020.

After receiving little interest from teams in spring 2021 after becoming a free agent, Venditte "took that as writing on the wall", he said, to work full time for a Peoria, Illinois, company.

== Pitching style ==
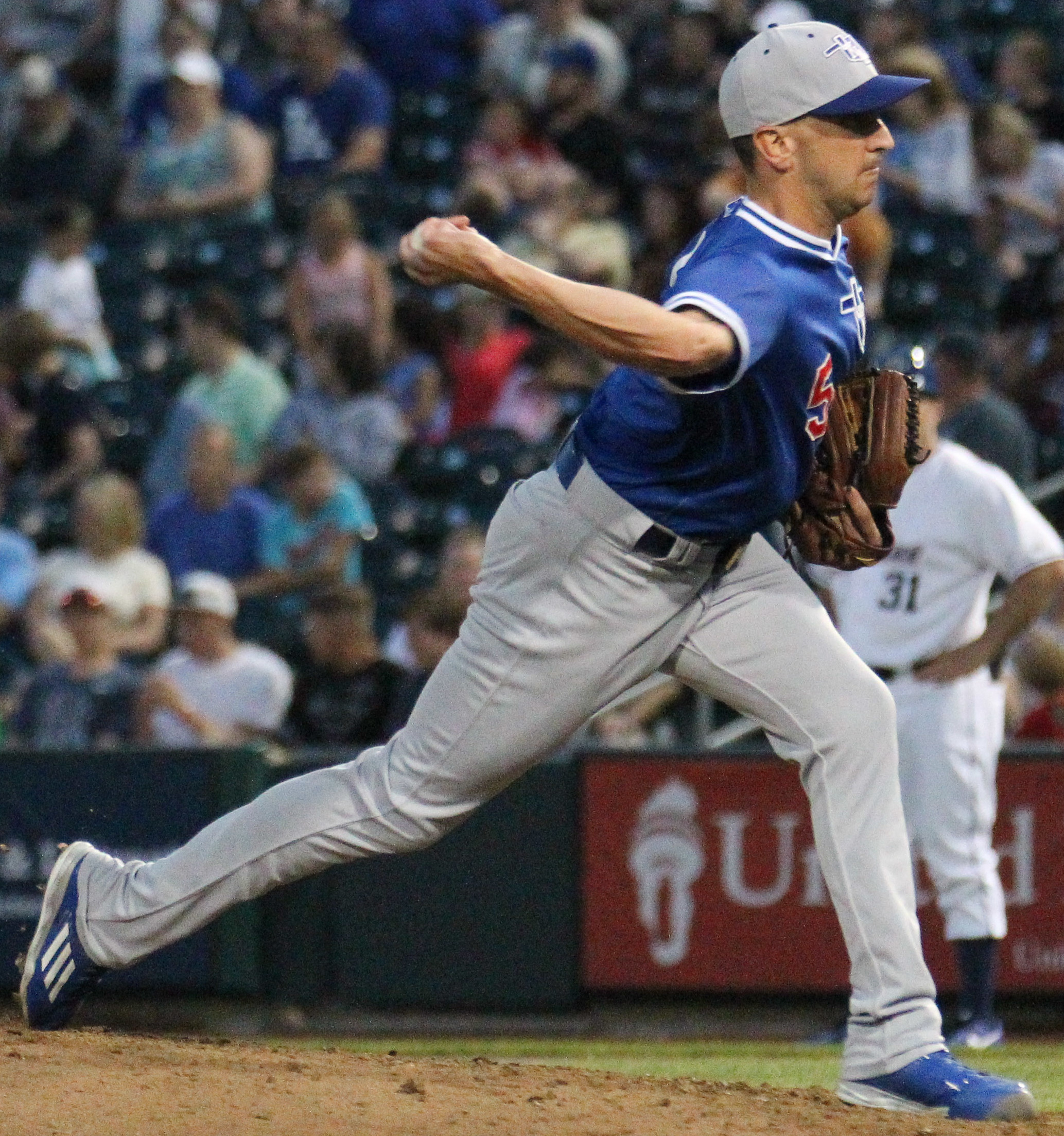
Venditte in 2018

When using his right arm, Venditte used to deliver over the top and could throw a slider and curveball, as well as a fastball at around 85 miles per hour (137 km/h) that topped out at 87 miles per hour (140 km/h). His left-handed delivery is side-armed in which he throws a slider and a fastball that reaches the low-to-mid 80s. Following Venditte's 2012 surgery on his right shoulder, Gil Patterson worked with him on a right-handed sidearm delivery. Although the injury slowed his right arm, Venditte's delivery is now almost identical from either side having lost the big overhand curveball, and observers have mistaken him for identical twins because he warms up one hand with the starting pitchers and the other with the relievers. Venditte is ambidextrous only when pitching. Despite batting left-handed, he is exclusively right-handed when performing tasks such as swinging a golf club, writing, or eating.

Venditte generally pitches with his right arm against right-handed batters and left-handed against left-handed batters, which minimizes his opponent's advantage when strategically ordering batters in the line-up based on which side of the plate they hit from. Mizuno has custom-made six-fingered gloves for Venditte since the age of seven with a thumb-hole on each side, allowing him to easily switch back and forth. By splitting his pitches between his arms, he is able to pitch longer than traditional pitchers before becoming fatigued. In 2015, ESPN speculated that Venditte "has quite possibly thrown more baseballs than any other man his age in history because he's had twice as many arms with which to throw them".

== The Pat Venditte rule ==
Venditte's rare ambidextrous abilities prompted the Professional Baseball Umpire Corporation (PBUC) to issue a new rule for dealing with ambidextrous pitchers, limiting the number of times that a switch-pitcher and switch-hitter can change sides during one at-bat. After consulting with a variety of sources, including the Major League Baseball Rules Committee, the PBUC issued its new guidelines on July 3, 2008. OBR Rule 5.07(f), known as the "Pat Venditte rule", currently reads:

A pitcher must indicate visually to the umpire-in-chief, the batter and any runners the hand with which he intends to pitch, which may be done by wearing his glove on the other hand while touching the pitcher's rubber. The pitcher is not permitted to pitch with the other hand until the batter is retired, the batter becomes a runner, the inning ends, the batter is substituted for by a pinch-hitter or the pitcher incurs an injury. In the event a pitcher switches pitching hands during an at-bat because he has suffered an injury, the pitcher may not, for the remainder of the game, pitch with the hand from which he has switched. The pitcher shall not be given the opportunity to throw any preparatory pitches after switching pitching hands. Any change of pitching hands must be indicated clearly to the umpire-in-chief.

Similar rules have been adopted by both the NCAA (rule 9-2k) and the National Federation of State High School Associations (rule 6–1–1).

== International career ==
Venditte pitched in four games in the 2013 World Baseball Classic (WBC), allowing three runs in three innings. He then appeared in three games for Italy in the 2017 WBC. He also pitched in four games for Italy in the 2014 European Baseball Championship, as his team finished in second place.

== Personal life ==
Venditte met his wife while they were both attending Creighton. Venditte became an Italian citizen before the 2013 World Baseball Classic. His great-grandfather immigrated to the United States from Italy.

== See also ==
- Greg A. Harris, the only other switch-pitcher in modern-era MLB
- Tony Mullane, a dead-ball-era pitcher who routinely switch-pitched
