= Brett Lawrie =

Canadian baseball player (born 1990)

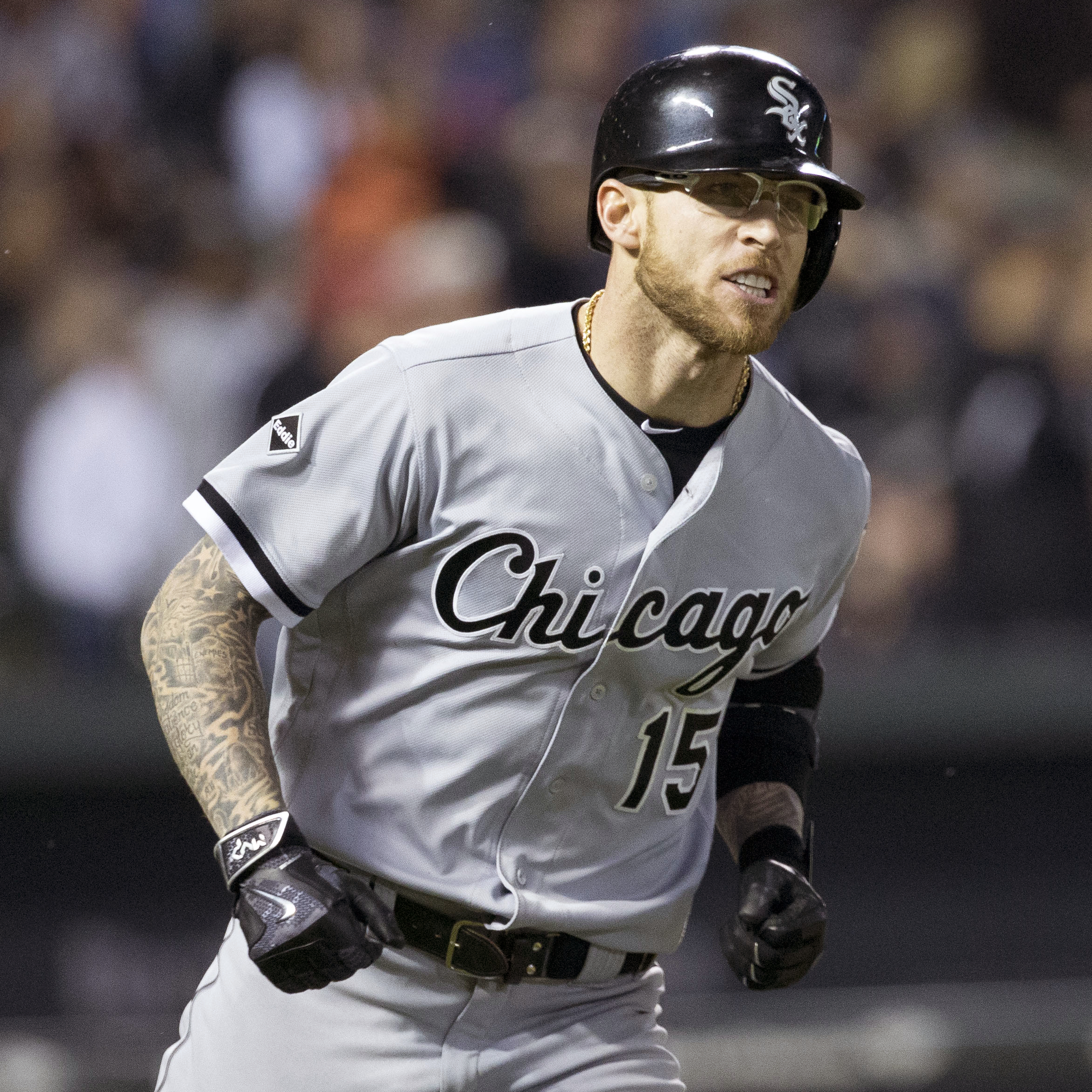
- Lawrie with the White Sox in 2016
- Third baseman / Second baseman
- Born: January 18, 1990 (age 36); Langley, British Columbia, Canada
- Batted: Right Threw: Right

MLB debut
- August 5, 2011, for the Toronto Blue Jays

Last MLB appearance
- July 21, 2016, for the Chicago White Sox

MLB statistics
- Batting average: .261
- Home runs: 71
- Runs batted in: 253
- Stats at Baseball Reference

Teams
- Toronto Blue Jays (2011–2014); Oakland Athletics (2015); Chicago White Sox (2016)
Medals
Men's baseball
Representing Canada
Baseball World Cup
Bronze medal – third place	2009 Nettuno	Team
World Junior Baseball Championship
Bronze medal – third place	2006 Sancti Spíritus	Team

Brett Russell Lawrie (born January 18, 1990) is a Canadian former professional baseball third baseman. He played in Major League Baseball (MLB) for the Toronto Blue Jays, Oakland Athletics, and Chicago White Sox.

== Amateur career ==
While playing high school baseball for the Langley Blaze of the British Columbia Premier Baseball League, Lawrie was selected with the 16th overall pick in the 2008 Major League Baseball draft by the Milwaukee Brewers. The selection of Lawrie was the fourth-highest a Canadian player has ever been drafted, behind only Jeff Francis, Adam Loewen, and Phillippe Aumont, and was the highest a Canadian position player has ever been drafted.

== Professional career ==
=== Milwaukee Brewers ===
Although he was used primarily as a catcher for his travel club, the Langley Blaze, Lawrie transitioned to second base when he was assigned to the Wisconsin Timber Rattlers of the Midwest League to begin the 2009 season. He was selected to play for the World Team at the 2009 MLB All-Star Futures Game at Busch Stadium in St. Louis. He was promoted to the Double-A Huntsville Stars in mid-August. On June 23, Lawrie was selected to the 2010 Futures Games, his second selection.

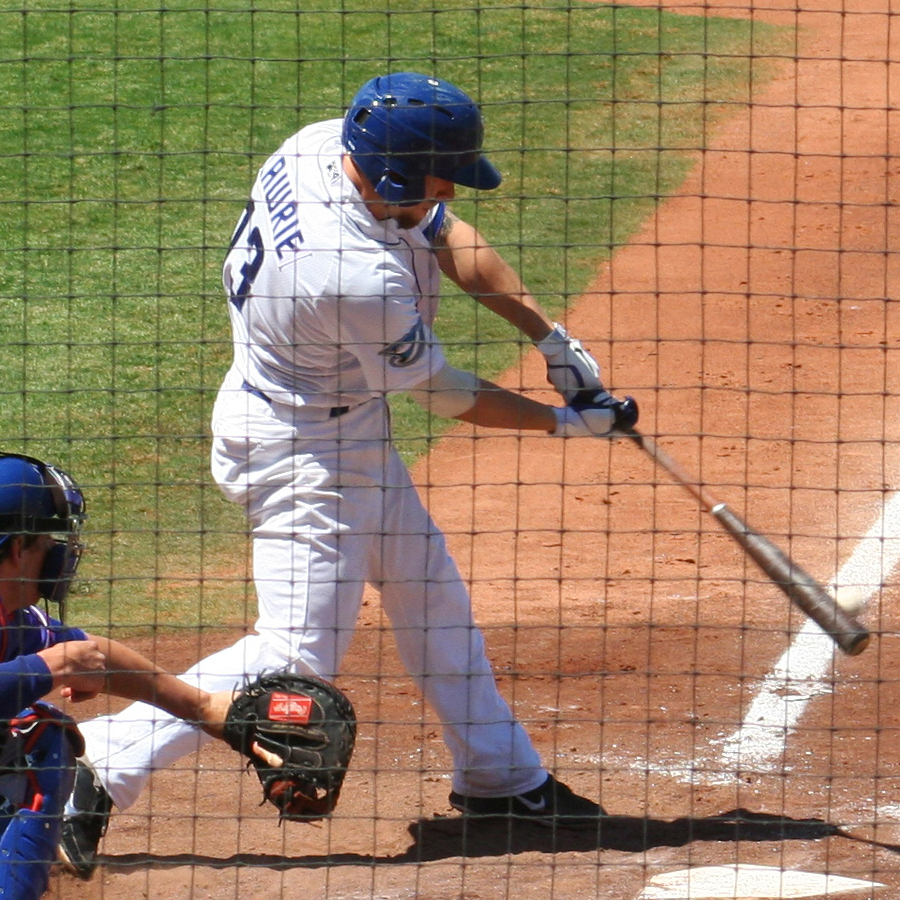
Lawrie batting for the Las Vegas 51s in 2011

Lawrie finished the 2010 season with a .285 batting average, eight home runs, 63 RBIs, 90 runs, 16 triples and 30 stolen bases in 135 games with Huntsville. For his efforts he was named to the Southern League Post-Season All-Star team on September 1, 2010.

=== Toronto Blue Jays ===
Considered by many to be one of Milwaukee's top prospects, he was traded on December 6, 2010, to the Toronto Blue Jays for starting pitcher Shaun Marcum. Despite Lawrie already having switched positions from catcher to second base after the Brewers drafted him, the Blue Jays moved Lawrie to third base.

On May 31, Lawrie was hit in the hand by a pitch and left the game with what was initially believed to be a broken hand. X-rays were negative and he was considered day-to-day, until it was later revealed by CAT scan that there was a non-displaced fracture, and he was expected to miss 2–3 weeks.

After a brief stint in Single-A Dunedin ending with a game where he was hit by a pitch twice, Lawrie was promoted back to Triple-A Las Vegas on July 18, 2011.

He was named the third baseman on Baseball America's 2011 Minor League All Star team.

On August 4, 2011, Lawrie was called up to the Toronto Blue Jays. Travis Snider was optioned to Triple-A to make room for Lawrie. He made his debut on August 5 against the Baltimore Orioles. In his first career at-bat, he recorded his first career hit and RBI. He finished 2-for–4 with one RBI and a fielding error. Two games later, he hit his first career home run, a solo shot off starter Alfredo Simón. In his second game at home on August 10, Lawrie recorded his first career grand slam, off Oakland reliever Craig Breslow. The grand slam was also his first hit at the Rogers Centre. In the following series against the Los Angeles Angels, Lawrie recorded his first career triple and stolen base. On September 5, Lawrie hit his first career walk-off home run, a solo shot in the 11th inning off reliever Dan Wheeler to defeat the Boston Red Sox 1–0.

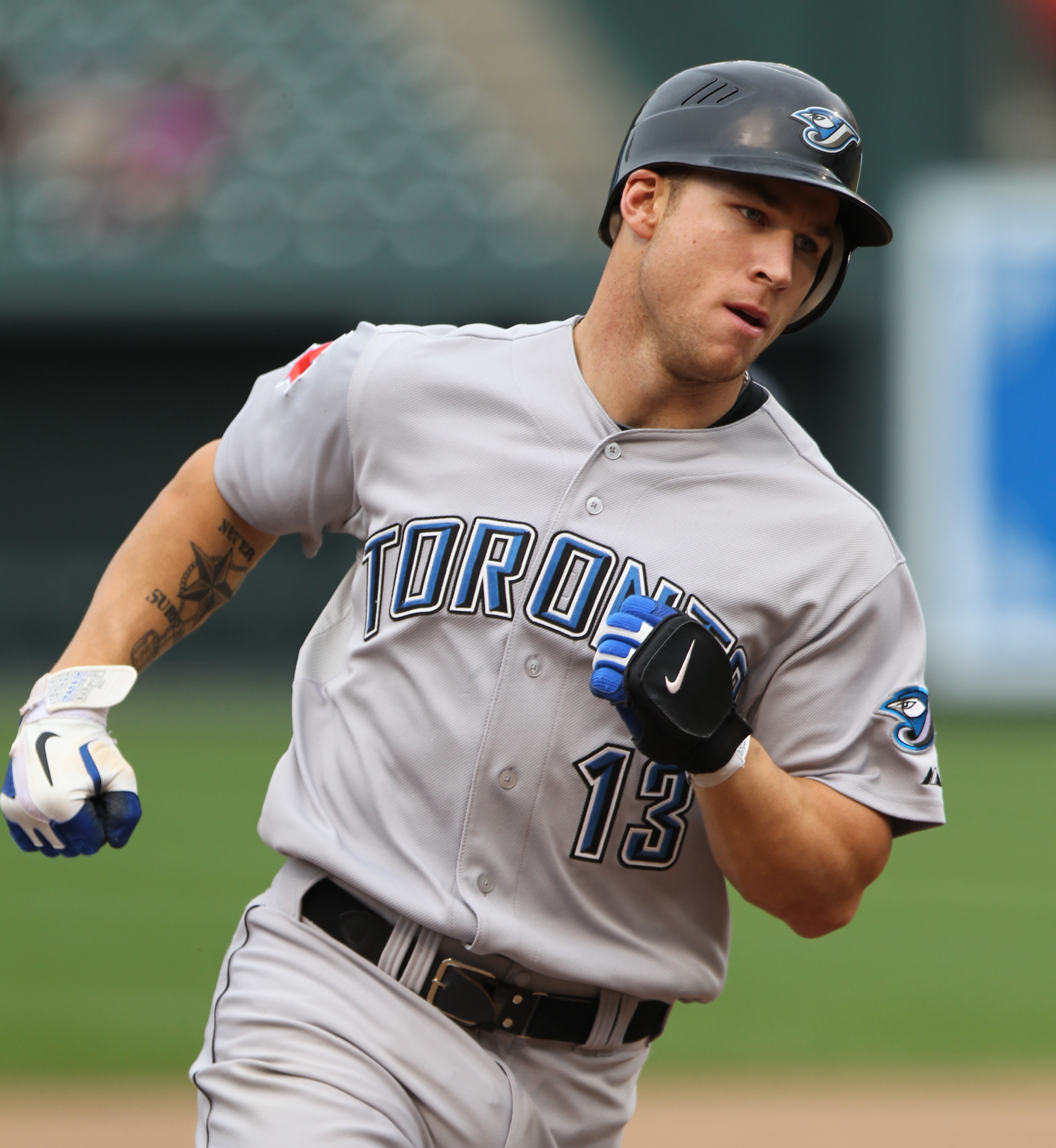
Lawrie scoring after a home run

Lawrie's first season ended prematurely when, on September 21, he fractured the middle finger on his right hand while fielding during batting practice. He finished his first season with a batting average of .293, nine home runs, 26 runs scored, seven stolen bases and 25 RBIs in 161 plate appearances.

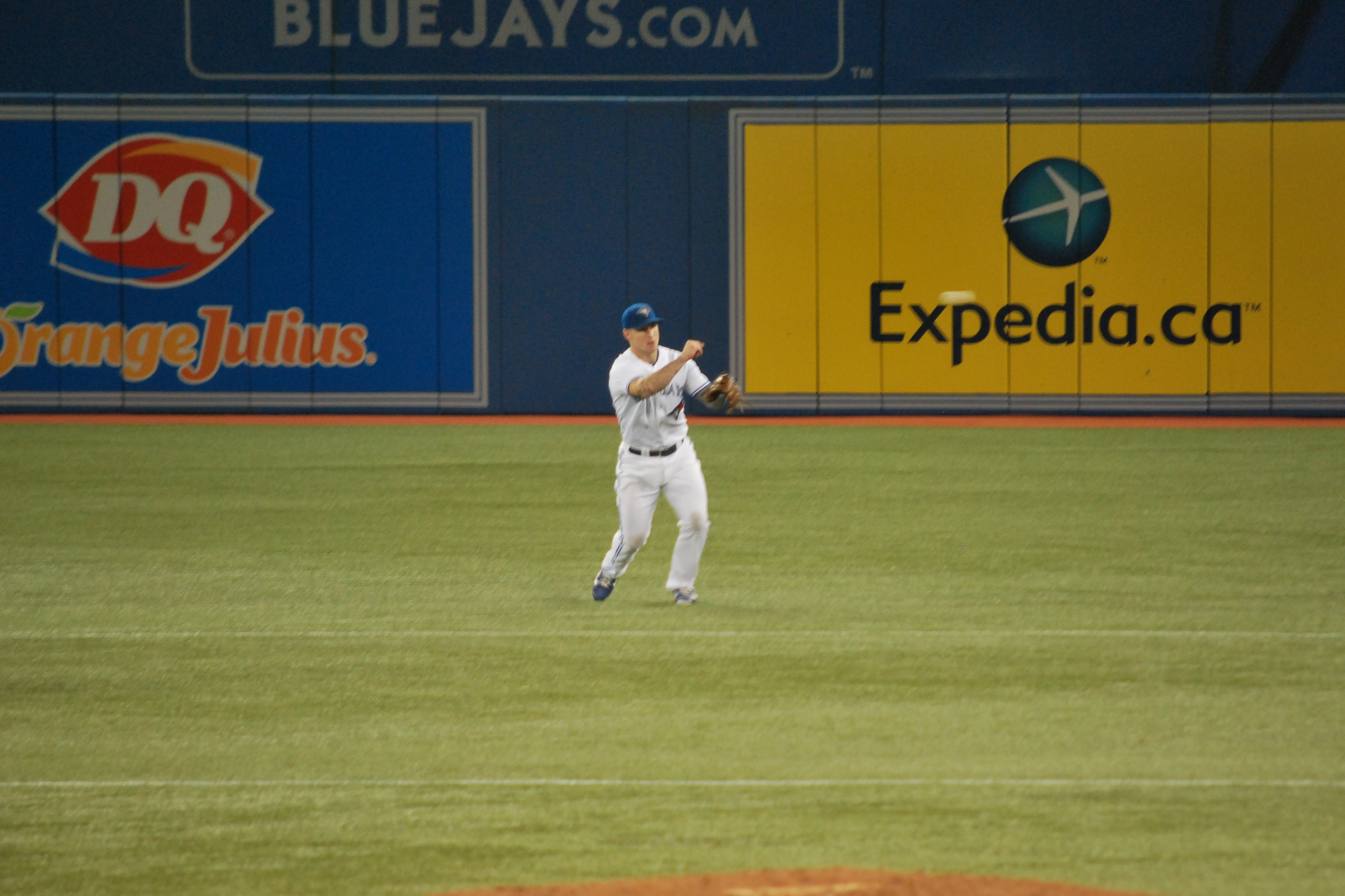
Lawrie in short right field throwing to first base after a ground ball hit to him. The Blue Jays at times employed an extreme infield shift for left-handed pull-hitters, moving Lawrie from third base to right field.

On May 1, 2012, Lawrie hit a game-winning, walk-off solo home run in the bottom of the 9th inning to give the Blue Jays an 8–7 win against the Texas Rangers. In a game against the Tampa Bay Rays on May 15, Lawrie was ejected from a game after objecting to being called out following consecutive questionable strike calls by umpire Bill Miller. The two pitches in question were shown by replay and through computerized strike zone analysis to not be in the strike zone. After both pitches, Lawrie started down the baseline, only to hear the strike call. Upon the strikeout call, Lawrie turned and yelled, prompting Miller to eject him. Lawrie threw his helmet on the ground, which then bounced and made contact with Miller. Manager John Farrell was also ejected after arguing with Miller. Lawrie was suspended for four games by Major League Baseball, and initially appealed the suspension but dropped the appeal on May 17. After a 7–4 loss to the Boston Red Sox on June 2, Lawrie was present at the Toronto Eaton Centre when a shooting took place. Lawrie, who was unharmed, posted on Twitter about the incident and was credited by some news outlets with breaking the story. On November 4, Lawrie was awarded the Wilson fielding award for defensive play at third base.

Lawrie began the 2013 season on the disabled list, and made his season debut on April 16 against the Chicago White Sox, going 0-3 with an RBI. Lawrie was placed on the 15-day disabled list on May 29 after spraining his ankle sliding into second base in a game on May 27. General manager Alex Anthopoulos said on June 24 that Lawrie would begin a rehab assignment on June 26 with the Class A-Advanced Dunedin Blue Jays. Lawrie started the June 26 game at third base for Dunedin. Lawrie continued his rehab with the Double-A New Hampshire Fisher Cats on July 6. His rehab assignment was changed to the Triple-A Buffalo Bisons on July 9. He played second base against the Syracuse Chiefs on July 9, and was recalled by the Blue Jays on July 13 to play against Baltimore.

Lawrie started at second base for the first time in his major league career on July 13, and finished the game 0–4. After making 6 starts at second base, manager John Gibbons said in an interview with MLB Network Radio that Lawrie would play at third base exclusively for the rest of the season. On August 10, Lawrie's career-high 11-game hitting streak ended. During the streak, he batted .400 with two home runs and six RBIs. In 107 games with Toronto in 2013, he hit .254 with 11 home runs, 46 RBIs and a .963 fielding percentage at third base.

On February 13, 2014, Lawrie was announced as the cover athlete for the Canadian version of MLB 14: The Show, succeeding teammate Jose Bautista, who had been the Canadian cover athlete for the previous two entries in the series. Lawrie hit his second career grand slam on April 15, 2014, in a 9–3 win over the Minnesota Twins. After the emergence of Juan Francisco as a viable option for the Blue Jays, Lawrie began playing second base against right-handed starting pitchers. He tied his career-high in home runs on June 6, 2014, when he hit his 11th of the season in a 3–1 win over the St. Louis Cardinals. Lawrie would then set a new career-high on June 20, when he hit his 12th of the season to assist the Blue Jays in a 14–9 win, having been down 8–0 after the second inning. Two days later, he was hit on the right hand by a pitch from Johnny Cueto, forcing him from the game. X-rays showed a fracture of his right index finger; Lawrie was placed on the 15-day disabled list. Lawrie was activated from the DL on August 5, and started at third base that night, but was removed from the game in the 4th inning due to back tightness. He was placed back on the 15-day disabled list on August 7 with an oblique strain. On September 2, Lawrie was moved to the 60-day disabled list, ending his 2014 season. He finished the year appearing in just 70 games, batting .247 with 12 home runs and 38 RBIs.

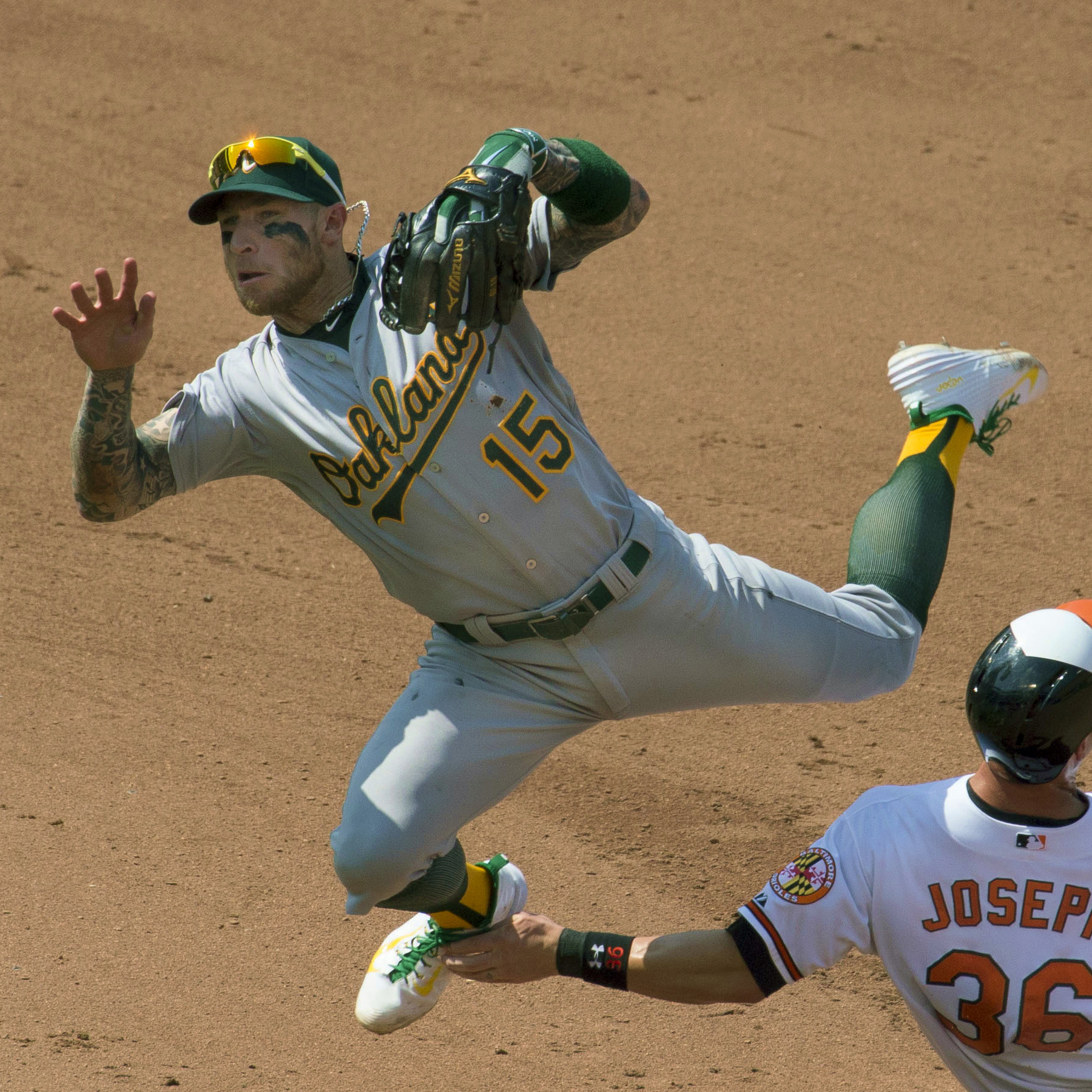
Lawrie playing for the Oakland Athletics in 2015

=== Oakland Athletics ===
On November 28, 2014, Lawrie was traded to the Oakland Athletics, along with Kendall Graveman, Sean Nolin, and Franklin Barreto, for Josh Donaldson. After struggling early in the season, including a game on April 7 in which he struck out 4 times on 12 total pitches (earning him a golden sombrero), Lawrie hit his first home run as an Athletic on April 13. In a game on June 5 between the Athletics and the Boston Red Sox at Boston's Fenway Park, a fan named Tonya Carpenter was injured when Lawrie's bat broke while swinging at a pitch. The barrel of the bat was thrown into the stands, hitting Carpenter in the head. According to the Boston Police Department, Carpenter lost an extensive amount of blood and suffered life-threatening head injuries, but another fan wrapped her head in his shirt tourniquet. She was quickly treated and taken by Fenway Park medical personnel to Boston's Beth Israel Deaconess Medical Center.

Lawrie finished the 2015 season with a .260 average, 16 home runs, and 60 RBIs in a career-high 149 games played.

=== Chicago White Sox ===
On December 9, 2015, Lawrie was traded to the Chicago White Sox for minor league pitchers J. B. Wendelken and Zachary Erwin. Primarily a third baseman in prior seasons, Lawrie mostly played second base with the White Sox, but was also used as a DH.

Lawrie played 94 games for Chicago before leaving the July 21 game against Detroit in the fourth inning, with what was originally described as a tweaked hamstring. He did not play for the team again, as the injury was later said to have also involved his quad, knee, and hip.

Lawrie avoided salary arbitration with the White Sox by agreeing to a one-year, $3.5 million contract for the 2017 season on December 3, 2016. However, he was released by the White Sox on March 3, 2017.

=== Second stint with the Brewers ===
After sitting out the 2017 and 2018 seasons, Lawrie signed a minor league contract with the Brewers on February 9, 2019. He was released by the club later that year on June 18 without playing a single game for the organization.

== International career ==
Lawrie was a member of the Canadian Junior National Team at the 2008 World Junior Baseball Championship where he led the tournament with a .469 batting average, three home runs and 16 runs batted in (RBIs). He was also selected to play for Canada at the 2008 Summer Olympics.

Lawrie represented Canada once again during the 2009 World Baseball Classic at the Rogers Centre in Toronto, Ontario. His only appearance during Canada's brief run in the tournament came during a 6–5 loss to the United States where he pinch-ran for Joey Votto in the ninth inning.

Lawrie was named to Canada's 2013 World Baseball Classic team, and took part in two pre-tournament games against the Milwaukee Brewers and the Cincinnati Reds. Lawrie exited the game against the Reds due to discomfort, and was later determined to have strained his ribs. He stayed with the team, but did not appear in the tournament due to this injury.

== Personal life ==
Lawrie became engaged to UCLA and United States women's national under-20 soccer team forward Sydney Leroux, a childhood friend against whom he played in youth baseball leagues in Metro Vancouver, in October 2010. They broke off the engagement in October 2011, during Leroux's senior year at UCLA and just before she received her first call-up to the United States women's national soccer team.

Lawrie became engaged to model Dana Long on June 29, 2015. Lawrie proposed on Long's birthday. They got married seven months later, on Lawrie's birthday. In February 2018, Lawrie announced they were expecting their first child together, a boy.

He is the brother of University of Washington and Canadian Olympic softball pitcher Danielle Lawrie.
