= Evan Scribner =

American baseball player (born 1985)

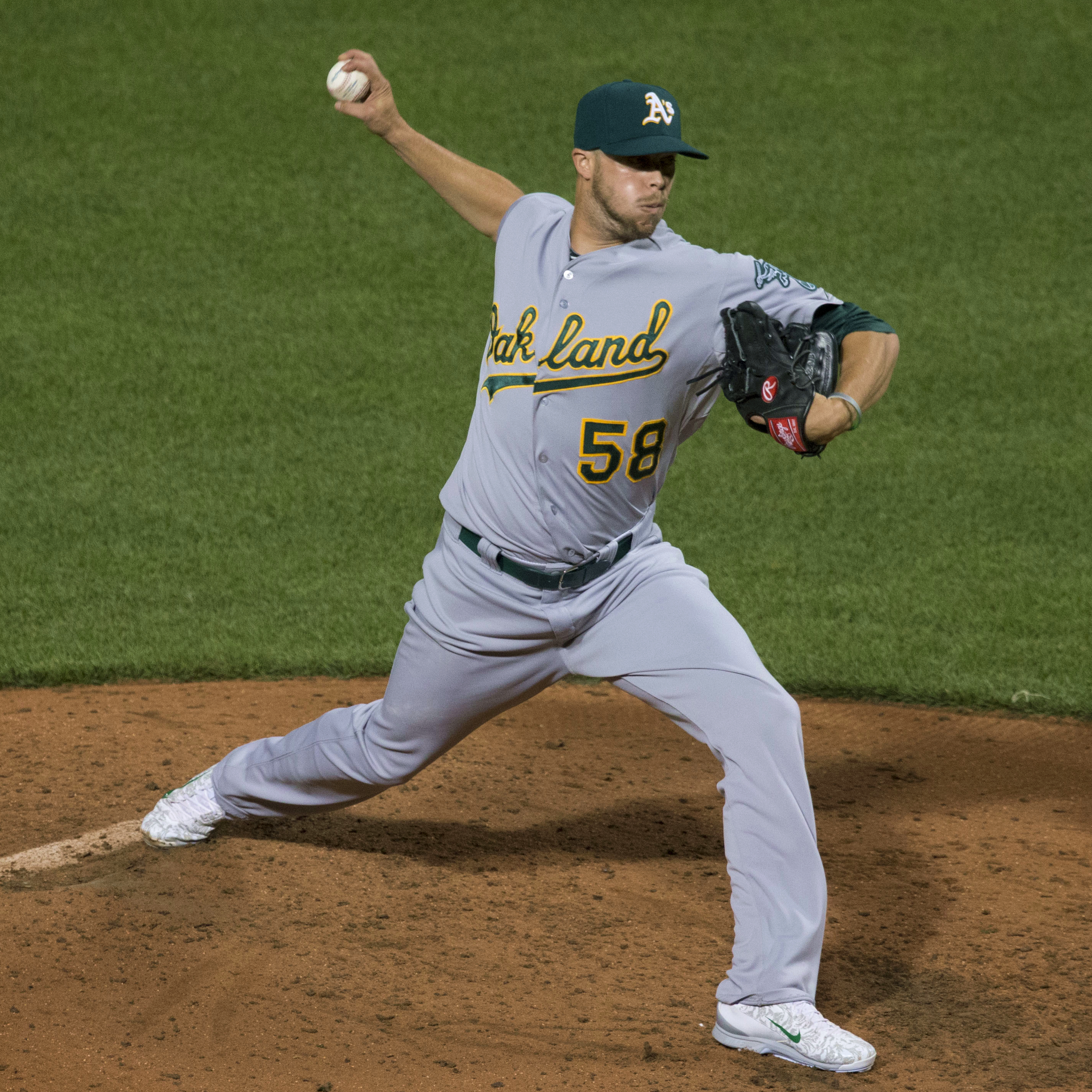
- Scribner pitching for the Oakland Athletics in 2015
- Pitcher
- Born: July 19, 1985 (age 40); New Milford, Connecticut, U.S.
- Batted: Right Threw: Right

MLB debut
- April 26, 2011, for the San Diego Padres

Last MLB appearance
- April 25, 2017, for the Seattle Mariners

MLB statistics
- Win–loss record: 5-4
- Earned run average: 4.15
- Strikeouts: 155
- Stats at Baseball Reference

Teams
- San Diego Padres (2011); Oakland Athletics (2012–2015); Seattle Mariners (2016–2017)

Evan Lee Scribner (born July 19, 1985) is an American former professional baseball pitcher. He played in Major League Baseball (MLB) for the San Diego Padres, Oakland Athletics, and Seattle Mariners.

== Professional career ==
=== Arizona Diamondbacks ===
Scribner was selected by the Arizona Diamondbacks in the 28th round (853rd overall) of the 2007 Major League Baseball draft from Central Connecticut State University where he set the school's record for both career wins (23) and saves (14).

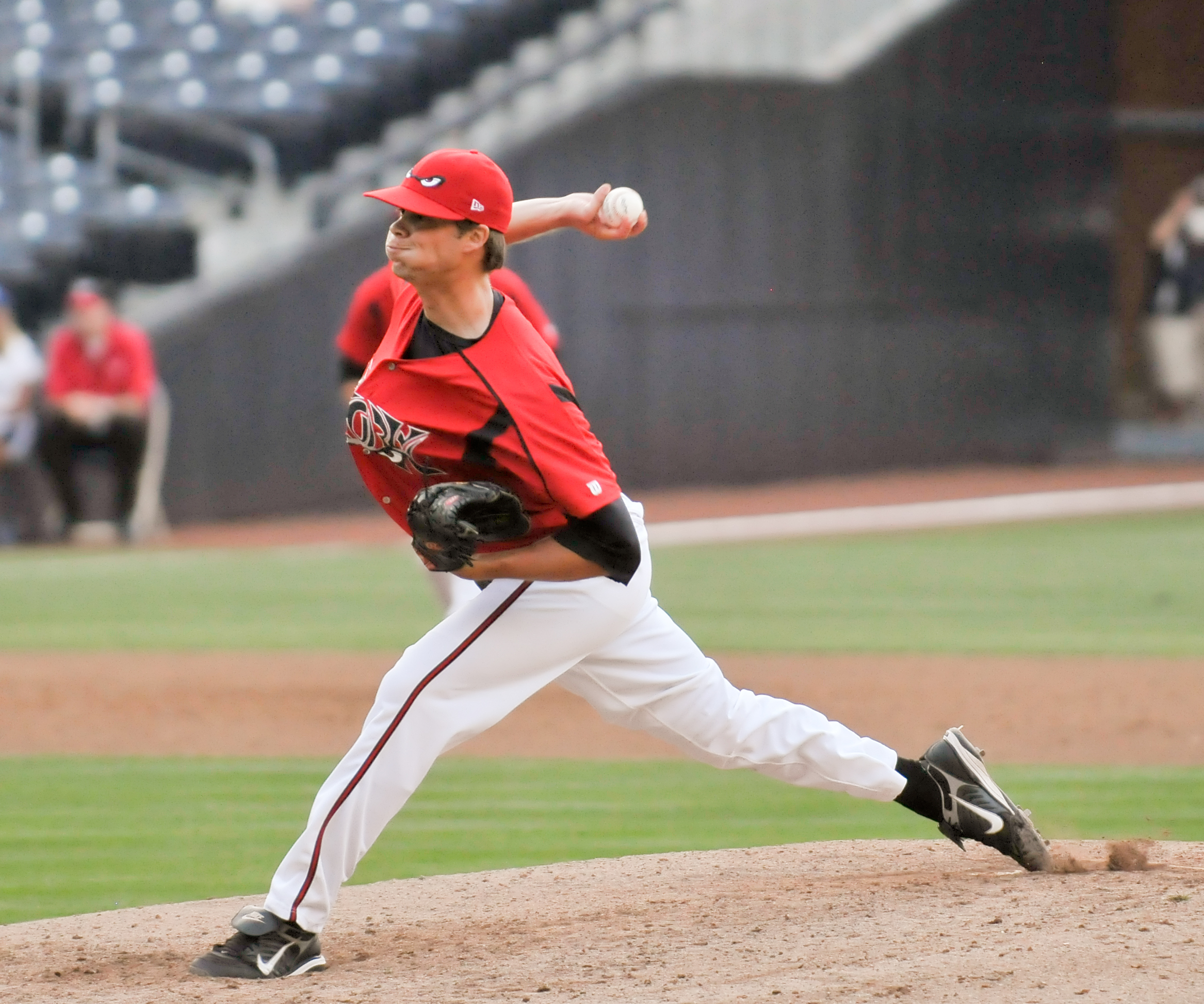
Scribner with the Lake Elsinore Storm in 2008

=== San Diego Padres ===
In 2008, the Diamondbacks traded Scribner to the San Diego Padres in return for Tony Clark. Following the 2010 season, he was added to the Padres' 40 man roster to protect him from the Rule 5 draft.

On April 25, 2011, Scribner was called up to replace spot-starter Wade LeBlanc. He made his MLB debut the next day.

=== Oakland Athletics ===
After the season, on October 25, 2011, he was claimed off waivers by the Oakland Athletics. Both of his wins on the season came in the last 9 games of the season. He received the win in the last game of the season against the Texas Rangers, this gave the Oakland A's the AL West division crown.

Scribner made the A's Opening day roster for the 2013 season, beating out Pedro Figueroa and non-roster relievers Hideki Okajima and Mike Ekstrom. Scribner was recalled on August 3, 2013 in exchange for Tommy Milone. He was recalled from the Triple-A Sacramento River Cats on August 28.

Scribner made the A's Opening day roster again in 2015, having developed a new pitch, he soon emerged as the setup man for Oakland with Tyler Clippard moving to the closer role as a result of 2014 closer Sean Doolittle being placed on the Disabled List with a Shoulder injury in early April. Scribner's season ended prematurely due to a torn lat muscle, he was placed on the 60-day disabled list on September 2, 2015.

=== Seattle Mariners ===
On December 8, 2015, Scribner was traded by the Athletics to the Seattle Mariners in exchange for minor league pitcher Trey Cochran-Gill. Scribner spent almost the entire 2016 season on the disabled list but was activated on September 1, 2016, and made his Mariners debut on September 3 against the Los Angeles Angels. Scribner was placed on waivers for his unconditional release from the Mariners on September 5, 2017.

=== New Britain Bees ===
On February 6, 2018, Scribner signed a minor league contract with the Tampa Bay Rays. Scribner was released by the Rays organization on March 7.

On May 15, 2018, Scribner signed with the New Britain Bees of the Atlantic League of Professional Baseball. He made 41 appearances for the Bees, compiling a 1-4 record and 2.20 ERA with 45 strikeouts and 24 saves over 41 innings of work. Scribner became a free agent following the season.

== Awards and honors ==
- 2004 Northeast Conference Tournament Most Valuable Player
- 2008 Midwest League Mid-Season All-Star
- 2009 Texas League All-Star

== Personal life ==
His brother, Troy Scribner, is a pitcher who last played in Major League Baseball for the Arizona Diamondbacks.
