= Carson Blair =

American baseball player (born 1989)

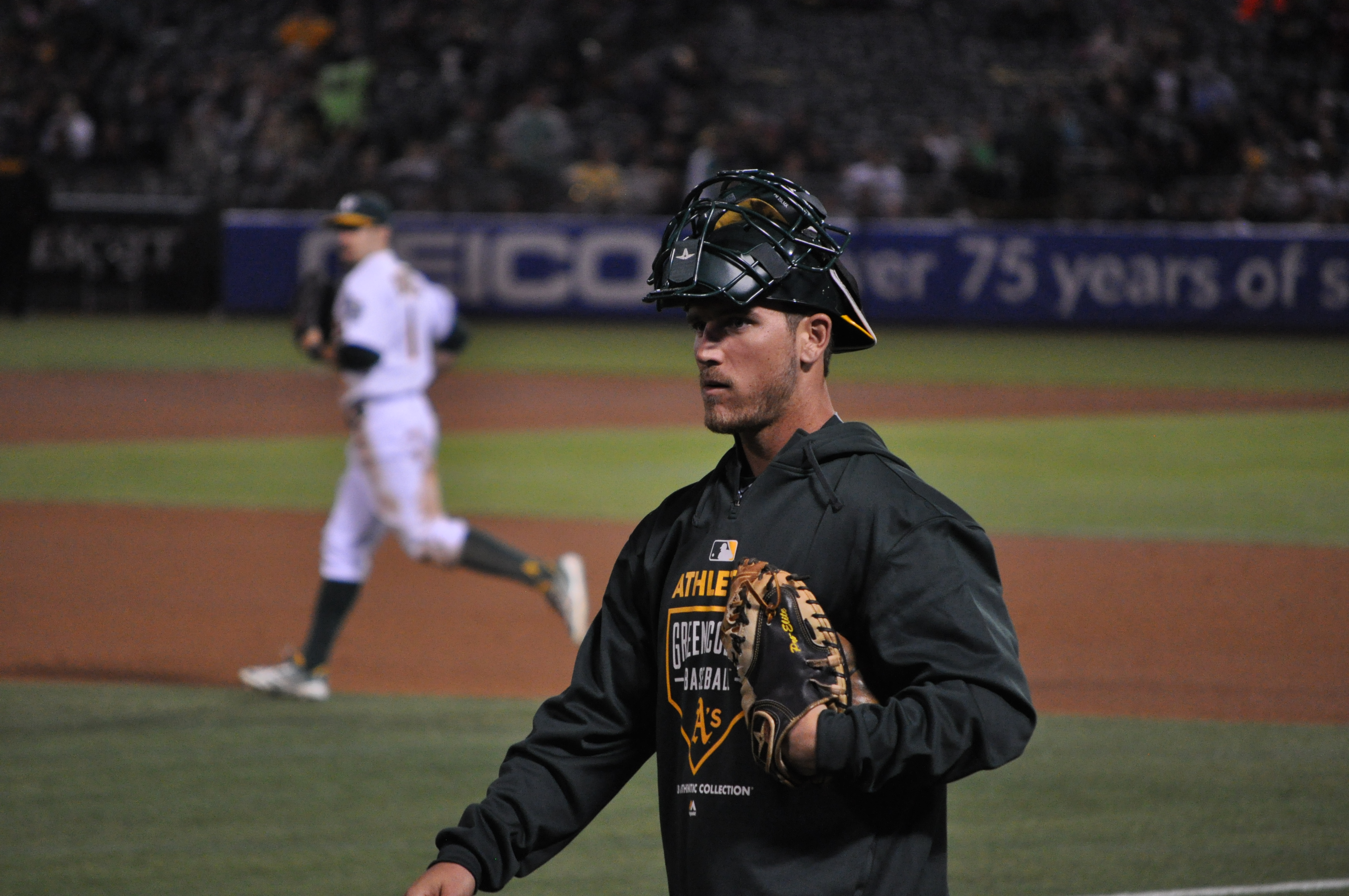
- Blair with the Oakland Athletics
- Catcher
- Born: October 18, 1989 (age 36); Carrollton, Texas, U.S.
- Batted: Right Threw: Right

MLB debut
- September 6, 2015, for the Oakland Athletics

Last MLB appearance
- September 24, 2015, for the Oakland Athletics

MLB statistics
- Batting average: .129
- Home runs: 1
- Runs batted in: 3
- Stats at Baseball Reference

Teams
- Oakland Athletics (2015)

Carson Reynolds Blair (born October 18, 1989) is an American former professional baseball catcher. He played in Major League Baseball (MLB) for the Oakland Athletics.

== Career ==
=== Boston Red Sox ===
Blair was drafted by the Boston Red Sox in the 35th round of the 2008 Major League Baseball draft out of Liberty Christian School in Argyle, Texas. He played in the Red Sox organization until 2014.

=== Oakland Athletics ===
On November 12, 2014, Blair signed a minor league contract with the Oakland Athletics. Blair was called up to the majors for the first time on September 1, 2015. He made his major league debut on September 6 in a 3–2 loss against the Seattle Mariners. Blair hit his only career home run, off Andrew Faulkner of the Texas Rangers on September 13 in a losing cause for Oakland.

On November 26, 2015, Blair re–signed with the Athletics on a minor league contract. He played the first half of the 2016 season with the Low–A Vermont Lake Monsters and Double–A Midland RockHounds, and was released on July 15, 2016.

=== Texas Rangers ===
On August 4, 2016, Blair signed a minor league contract with the Texas Rangers organization. He spent the remainder of the season with the Double–A Frisco RoughRiders, also appearing in three games for the Triple–A Round Rock Express. In 19 games for the Express, Blair batted .164/.282/.269 with one home run and seven RBI. He elected free agency following the season on November 7.

=== Chicago White Sox ===
On January 17, 2017, Blair signed a minor league contract with the Chicago White Sox. He was released on July 21.
