= Sean Nolin =

American baseball player (born 1989)

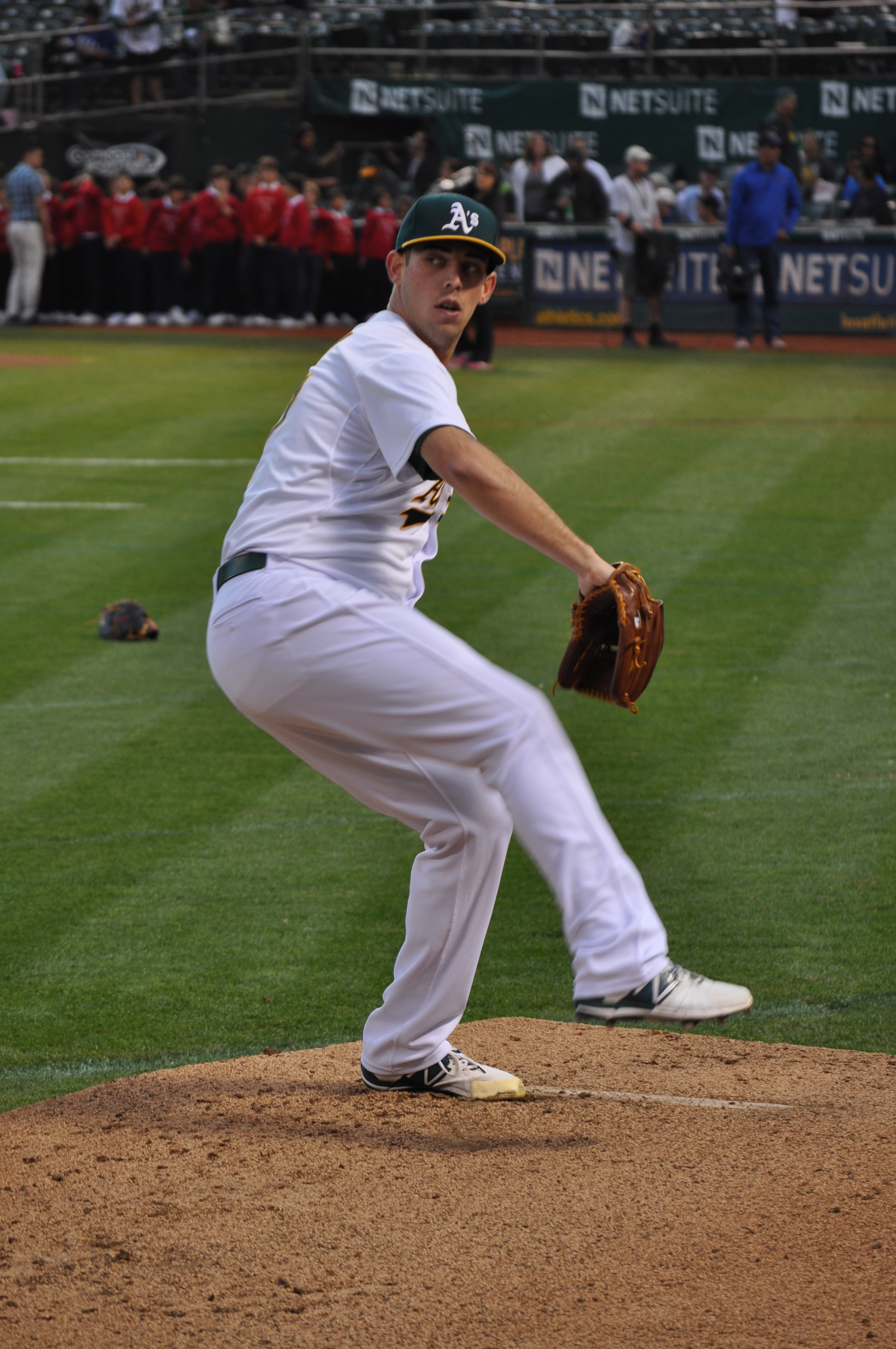
- Nolin pitching for the Oakland Athletics in 2015

Free agent
- Pitcher
- Born: December 26, 1989 (age 36); Seaford, New York, U.S.
- Bats: Left Throws: Left

Professional debut
- MLB: May 24, 2013, for the Toronto Blue Jays
- NPB: August 29, 2020, for the Saitama Seibu Lions
- KBO: April 3, 2022, for the Kia Tigers

MLB statistics (through 2023 season)
- Win–loss record: 1–5
- Earned run average: 6.34
- Strikeouts: 37

NPB statistics (through 2020 season)
- Win–loss record: 1–2
- Earned run average: 6.75
- Strikeouts: 21

KBO statistics (through 2022 season)
- Win–loss record: 8–8
- Earned run average: 2.47
- Strikeouts: 108
- Stats at Baseball Reference

Teams
- Toronto Blue Jays (2013–2014); Oakland Athletics (2015); Saitama Seibu Lions (2020); Washington Nationals (2021); Kia Tigers (2022); Miami Marlins (2023)

Sean Patrick Nolin (born December 26, 1989) is an American professional baseball pitcher who is a free agent. He has previously played in Major League Baseball (MLB) for the Toronto Blue Jays, Oakland Athletics, Washington Nationals, and Miami Marlins. He has also played in Nippon Professional Baseball (NPB) for the Saitama Seibu Lions and in the KBO League for the Kia Tigers.

== Professional career ==
=== Toronto Blue Jays ===
Nolin was drafted by the Toronto Blue Jays in the sixth round of the 2010 MLB Entry Draft out of San Jacinto Junior College. He had originally been selected by the Milwaukee Brewers in the fiftieth round of the 2008 Major League Baseball draft, and by the Seattle Mariners in the forty-eighth round of the 2009 Major League Baseball draft, but did not sign either time.

Nolin debuted with the Auburn Doubledays of the New York–Penn League in 2010, starting six games while recording a 6.05 ERA. In 2011, he had a 4–4 record and 3.49 ERA with the Lansing Lugnuts. Nolin split the 2012 season between the Dunedin Blue Jays and the New Hampshire Fisher Cats, finishing at 10–0 with a 2.04 ERA. Nolin missed the first month of the 2013 baseball season with a groin injury suffered during spring training. On May 23, 2013, it was announced that Nolin would be called up to the Major Leagues to start on May 24, 2013 against the Baltimore Orioles. He was formally called up on May 24 when J. A. Happ was transferred to the 60-day disabled list. Nolin took the loss in his debut, pitching 1 1/3 innings and giving up six earned runs and one walk. He was optioned back to Double-A New Hampshire following the 10–6 loss. Nolin was ranked as the number 5 prospect in the Blue Jays organization on July 26, 2013, when the revised Top 100 Prospects list was released. Nolin was promoted to the Triple-A Buffalo Bisons on August 17. Nolin was invited to spring training in 2014 and optioned to the Buffalo Bisons on March 16, 2014. He posted a 4–7 record in the minors in 2014, with an ERA of 3.43 and 88 strikeouts over 97 innings pitched.

Nolin was called up to the Blue Jays on September 1, as part of the September roster expansion. He would make just one appearance for Toronto in 2014, pitching a single inning of relief on September 22.

=== Oakland Athletics ===
On November 28, 2014, Nolin was traded to the Oakland Athletics, along with Brett Lawrie, Kendall Graveman, and Franklin Barreto, for Josh Donaldson. He was recalled from the Triple-A Nashville Sounds on September 4, 2015. On September 6, he made his Athletics debut in a 3–2 loss against the Seattle Mariners. Nolin earned his first MLB win on September 12, as the Athletics defeated the Texas Rangers 5–3.

On February 12, 2016, the A's designated Nolin for assignment.

=== Milwaukee Brewers ===
On February 22, 2016, Nolin was claimed off waivers by the Milwaukee Brewers. On August 21, Nolin underwent Tommy John surgery, and was put on the injured list for the rest of the 2016 season plus all of 2017. He re-signed with the club on a minor league deal for the 2017 season. Nolin did not make an appearance on the year as he recovered from surgery, and elected free agency on November 6, 2017.

=== Colorado Rockies ===
On February 18, 2018, Nolin signed a minor league deal with the Colorado Rockies. In 29 games for the Double–A Hartford Yard Goats, he compiled a 4.24 ERA with 45 strikeouts across 40 1/3 innings pitched. Nolin elected free agency following the season on November 2.

=== Chicago White Sox ===
On February 28, 2019, Nolin signed a minor league deal with the Chicago White Sox. He was released on April 25, 2019.

=== Long Island Ducks ===
On May 3, 2019, Nolin signed with the Long Island Ducks of the Atlantic League of Professional Baseball.

=== Seattle Mariners ===
On June 7, 2019, Nolin's contract was purchased by the Seattle Mariners and he was assigned to the Triple-A Tacoma Rainiers. In 15 games (14 starts) for Tacoma, he registered a 6–4 record and 4.76 ERA with 74 strikeouts over 79 1/3 innings pitched. Nolin elected free agency following the season on November 4.

=== Saitama Seibu Lions ===
On December 6, 2019, Nolin signed with the Saitama Seibu Lions of Nippon Professional Baseball (NPB). On August 29, 2020, Nolin made his NPB debut, and he earned his first NPB win. In 5 games for Seibu, he compiled a 1–2 record and 6.75 ERA with 21 strikeouts over 21 1/3 innings. On December 2, Nolin became a free agent.

=== Washington Nationals ===
On March 9, 2021, Nolin signed a minor league contract with the Washington Nationals organization. On August 11, the Nationals selected Nolin's contract, marking his first appearance in MLB in 6 years. On September 9, Nolin intentionally threw at Atlanta Braves' first baseman Freddie Freeman, and was issued a 5-game suspension, in which he did not appeal. Nolin made 10 appearances for the Nationals, going 0–2 with a 4.39 ERA and 20 strikeouts. On October 13, the Nationals sent Nolin outright to Triple-A Rochester. Nolin elected free agency but signed a new minor league deal with the Nationals for 2022 on November 2, 2021. However, Nolin was later released to sign overseas.

=== Kia Tigers ===
On January 8, 2022, Nolin signed with the Kia Tigers of the KBO League. Nolin made 21 starts for Kia, posting an 8–8 record and 2.47 ERA with 108 strikeouts in 124.0 innings pitched. He became a free agent after the 2022 season.

=== Miami Marlins ===
On February 10, 2023, Nolin signed a minor league contract with the Minnesota Twins organization. On April 9, Nolin was traded to the Miami Marlins and assigned to the Triple-A Jacksonville Jumbo Shrimp. He made one appearance, allowing 4 runs (3 earned) in 4.0 innings pitched. On April 24, Nolin had his contract selected to the active roster. He pitched three innings of mop up relief against the Atlanta Braves that night, surrendering 6 earned runs on 7 hits and 2 walks. Nolin was designated for assignment by Miami the following day. He cleared waivers and was sent outright to Triple–A Jacksonville on April 27. Nolin elected free agency on October 13.

=== Piratas de Campeche ===
On March 10, 2025, after a year of inactivity, Nolin signed with the Piratas de Campeche of the Mexican League. Nolin made 10 starts for Campeche, logging a 4–3 record with a 4.22 ERA and 31 strikeouts across 49 innings of work.

Nolin made nine starts for the Piratas in 2026, but struggled to an 0–5 record with a 10.27 ERA, 24 strikeouts, and nine walks across 30 2/3 innings pitched. On June 17, 2026, Nolin was released by Campeche.

== Pitching style ==
Nolin's fastball runs in the high-80s to low-90s in MPH and he also throws a curveball (72–75 MPH), changeup (low-80s in MPH), and slider.
