= Franklin Barreto =

Venezuelan baseball player (born 1996)

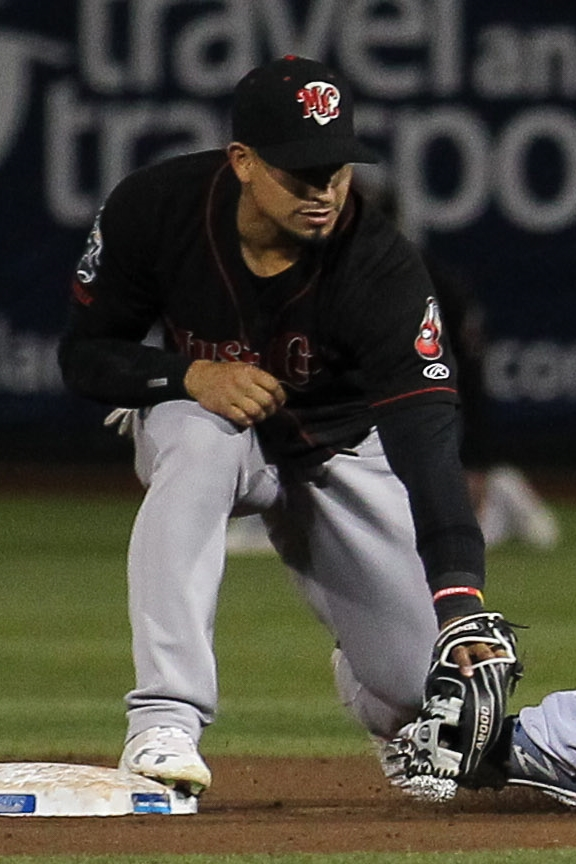
- Barreto with the Nashville Sounds in 2018

Diablos Rojos del México – No. 27
- Shortstop / Second baseman
- Born: February 27, 1996 (age 30); Caracas, Venezuela
- Bats: Right Throws: Right

MLB debut
- June 24, 2017, for the Oakland Athletics

MLB statistics (through 2020 season)
- Batting average: .175
- Home runs: 9
- Runs batted in: 29
- Stats at Baseball Reference

Teams
- Oakland Athletics (2017–2020); Los Angeles Angels (2020)

Franklin José Barreto Rojas (born February 27, 1996) is a Venezuelan professional baseball shortstop and second baseman for the Diablos Rojos del México of the Mexican League. He has previously played in Major League Baseball (MLB) for the Oakland Athletics and Los Angeles Angels.

== Career ==
=== Toronto Blue Jays ===
Barreto signed with the Toronto Blue Jays for a $1.45 million signing bonus on July 2, 2012, as Baseball America's top-ranked international prospect of 2012. He played his first professional season with the Gulf Coast League Blue Jays, and later the Bluefield Blue Jays, batting .276 in 59 total games played and leading the Gulf Coast League in slugging percentage. In 2014, he was promoted to the Vancouver Canadians and opened the season with a .313 batting average through 43 games. Barreto played in 73 games for Vancouver in 2014, and batted .311 with 6 home runs, 61 runs batted in, and 29 stolen bases. On September 24, he was named the MVP for Vancouver in 2014. On October 1, Barreto was named the top prospect in the Northwest League by Baseball America.

=== Oakland Athletics ===
On November 28, 2014, the Blue Jays traded Barreto, Kendall Graveman, Sean Nolin, and Brett Lawrie to the Oakland Athletics for Josh Donaldson. His 2015 season with the Advanced-A Stockton Ports ended early when he was placed on the disabled list on July 26 with a wrist contusion. Barreto appeared in 90 games and hit .302 with 13 home runs and 47 runs batted in. He committed 34 errors at shortstop, which led the California League. In the offseason, he played 30 games with the Águilas del Zulia of the Venezuelan Winter League, batting .174 with 2 home runs and 14 runs batted in.

Barreto was named as the 8th best shortstop prospect by MLB going into the 2016 season. He was selected as a Texas League All-Star while playing with the Double-A Midland RockHounds in 2016. On August 31, he was promoted to the Triple-A Nashville Sounds. Barreto finished the 2016 season batting .284 with 11 home runs and 53 runs batted in. After the 2016 season, the Athletics assigned Barreto to the Mesa Solar Sox of the Arizona Fall League, and added him to their 40-man roster. He began the 2017 season with Nashville, hitting .281 with 32 runs batted in during 68 games. He was recalled by the Athletics on June 24. He made his major league debut that afternoon, playing second base. During the game, he recorded his first career home run in his second career at-bat off of James Shields. Barreto hit .180 with an OPS of .570 in parts of four seasons for the Athletics, seeing the most action in 2018, playing in 32 games and going hitless in 10 at-bats.

=== Los Angeles Angels ===
On August 28, 2020, the Athletics traded Barreto to the Los Angeles Angels in exchange for Tommy La Stella. On March 31, 2021, Barreto was placed on the 60-day injured list due to right elbow inflammation. On May 11, it was announced that Barreto would undergo Tommy John surgery. On October 23, 2021, Barreto elected free agency.

=== Houston Astros ===
On March 22, 2022, Barreto signed a minor league contract with the Houston Astros. He was released on August 10, 2022. In his final start for the Sugar Land Space Cowboys, Barreto homered off former Astros ace and Cy Young Award winner Dallas Keuchel as part of a five-run batted in day. Over 73 games for Sugar Land, Barreto appeared at second base, shortstop, and third base, batting .162/.259/.274.

=== Washington Nationals ===
On December 1, 2022, Barreto signed a minor league deal with the Washington Nationals. He was assigned to the Triple-A Rochester Red Wings to begin the 2023 season, appearing in 29 games and hitting .202/.282/.455 with 7 home runs, 15 runs batted in, and 2 stolen bases. Barreto was released by the Nationals organization on May 28, 2023.

=== Tecolotes de los Dos Laredos ===
On June 5, 2023, Barreto signed with the Tecolotes de los Dos Laredos of the Mexican League. In 25 games, he batted .264/.369/.460 with 3 home runs and 15 RBI. Barreto was waived on July 8.

=== Diablos Rojos del México ===
On November 21, 2023, Barreto signed with the Diablos Rojos del México of the Mexican League. In 76 games for México in 2024, he slashed .343/.430/.576 with 16 home runs, 63 RBI, and eight stolen bases. With the team, Barreto won the Serie del Rey.

=== Baltimore Orioles ===
On November 25, 2024, Barreto signed a minor league contract with the Baltimore Orioles. He did not appear for the organization, instead spending the entirety of his stint with Baltimore on the minor league injured list. Barreto was released by the Orioles organization on August 31, 2025.

=== Diablos Rojos del México (second stint) ===
On January 4, 2026, Barreto signed with the Diablos Rojos del México of the Mexican League.
