= Kendall Graveman =

American baseball player (born 1990)

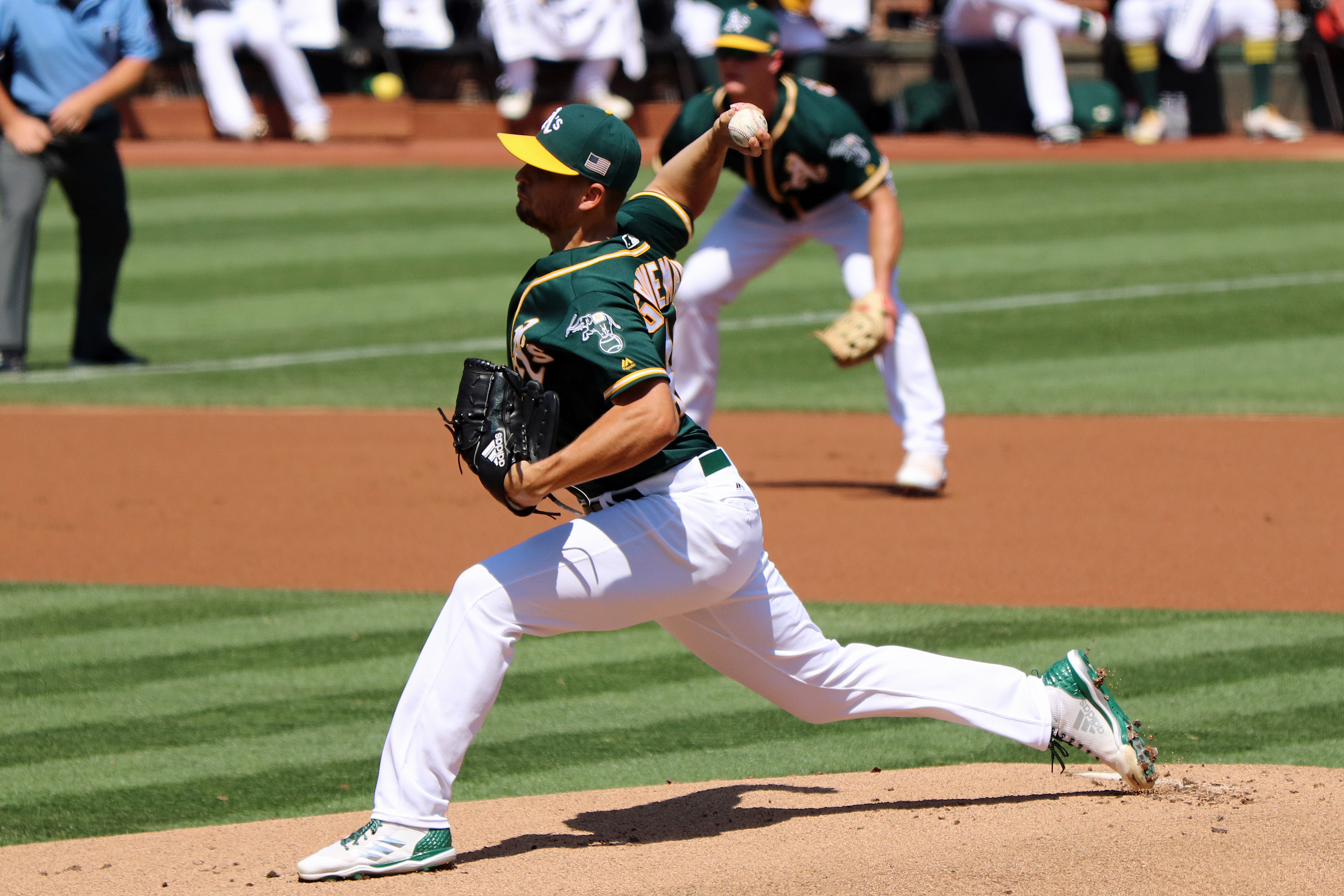
- Graveman with the Oakland Athletics in 2017

Free agent
- Pitcher
- Born: December 21, 1990 (age 35); Alexander City, Alabama, U.S.
- Bats: Right Throws: Right

MLB debut
- September 5, 2014, for the Toronto Blue Jays

MLB statistics (through 2025 season)
- Win–loss record: 38–43
- Earned run average: 4.03
- Strikeouts: 503
- Stats at Baseball Reference

Teams
- Toronto Blue Jays (2014); Oakland Athletics (2015–2018); Seattle Mariners (2020–2021); Houston Astros (2021); Chicago White Sox (2022–2023); Houston Astros (2023); Arizona Diamondbacks (2025)
Medals
Men's baseball
Representing United States
World Baseball Classic
Silver medal – second place	2023 Miami	Team

Kendall Chase Graveman (born December 21, 1990) is an American professional baseball pitcher who is a free agent. He has previously played in Major League Baseball (MLB) for the Toronto Blue Jays, Oakland Athletics, Seattle Mariners, Houston Astros, Chicago White Sox, and Arizona Diamondbacks.

Graveman played college baseball for Mississippi State University. He was drafted by the Blue Jays in the eighth round of the 2013 MLB draft, and played parts of two seasons in minor league baseball before being called up by the Blue Jays in 2014. Working exclusively as a starting pitcher since his first full year in the major leagues, he became a relief pitcher in 2020 following a medical diagnosis of a benign bone tumor in his cervical spine.

== Amateur career ==
Graveman attended Benjamin Russell High School, where he posted a 6–3 win–loss record with a 1.19 earned run average (ERA) and 90 strikeouts over 63 innings pitched in his senior year. He enrolled at Mississippi State University and played college baseball for the Mississippi State Bulldogs. In 2010, his freshman year, Graveman was used primarily as a reliever and finished the season with a 2–4 record and a 7.02 ERA. In 2011, he made 14 appearances (nine games started), compiling a 5–0 record and a 3.65 ERA. The Miami Marlins drafted Graveman in the 36th round of the 2012 Major League Baseball draft, but did not sign with the team. In 2011, he played collegiate summer baseball with the Cotuit Kettleers of the Cape Cod Baseball League, and returned to the league in 2012 to play for the Wareham Gatemen. In his senior year at MSU, he made 16 starts, including 10 against Southeastern Conference teams, and posted a 4–4 record with a 2.81 ERA and 59 strikeouts.

== Professional career ==
=== Toronto Blue Jays ===
==== Minor leagues ====
The Toronto Blue Jays selected Graveman in the eighth round, with the 235th overall selection, in the 2013 MLB draft. He received a signing bonus of $5,000, and was assigned to the Single-A Lansing Lugnuts. Graveman would pitch to a 1–3 record and a 4.31 ERA over 39 2/3 innings in 2013.

Graveman began the 2014 season with Lansing, but was promoted to the High-A Dunedin Blue Jays after making four starts for the Lugnuts and posting a 2–0 record with a 0.34 ERA, including a near no-hitter over the Beloit Snappers. In Dunedin, he compiled an 8–4 record in 16 starts, with a 2.23 ERA and 64 strikeouts. Graveman was promoted to the Double-A New Hampshire Fisher Cats and made just 1 start, a 6-inning win over the Binghamton Mets, before being promoted to the Triple-A Buffalo Bisons. In his Triple-A debut, he took the loss, pitching 6 innings in a 2–1 loss to the Norfolk Tides. Graveman would allow only 1 earned run in his following 3 starts, bringing his ERA to 1.04 through 26 innings with Buffalo. He finished the 2014 minor league season with a 14–6 record over 167 1/3 innings, with an ERA of 1.83, 115 strikeouts, and a WHIP of 1.03. He also gave up only 2 home runs and issued 31 walks, for a BB/9 of 1.7. On September 3, Graveman was named to Baseball America's First Team All-Stars for 2014.

==== Major leagues ====
On September 1, 2014, Graveman was called up to the Blue Jays as a part of the September roster expansion. He made his MLB debut on September 5, against the Boston Red Sox. Graveman made 5 total appearances for the Blue Jays in 2014, and posted a 3.86 ERA, 4 strikeouts, no walks, and a 0.86 WHIP in 4 2/3 innings pitched.

=== Oakland Athletics ===
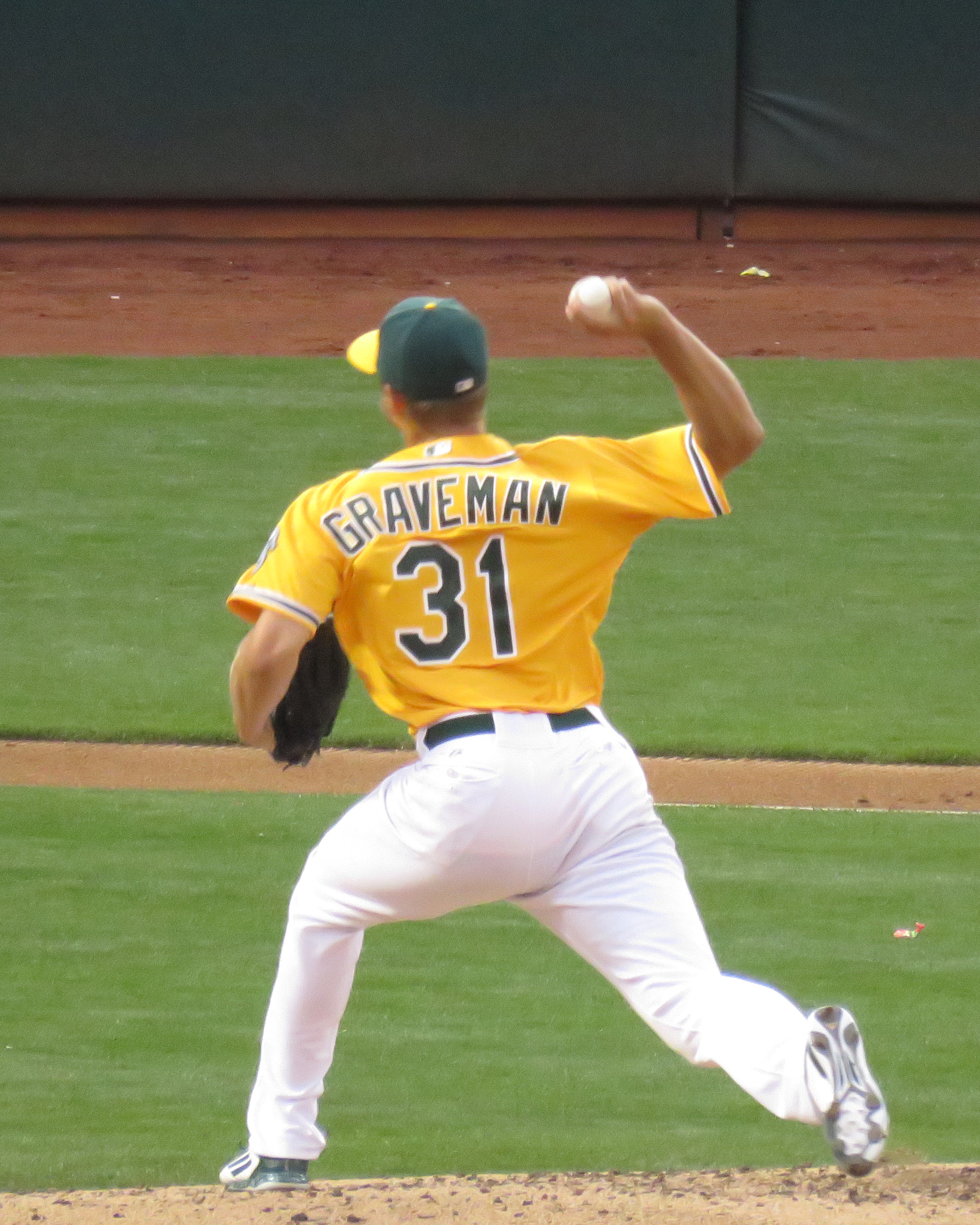
Graveman pitching for Oakland in 2015.

On November 28, 2014, Graveman was traded to the Oakland Athletics, along with Brett Lawrie, Sean Nolin, and Franklin Barreto, for Josh Donaldson. After opening the season as the fifth starter, Graveman was optioned to the Triple-A Nashville Sounds on April 26, 2015, after going 1–2 with an 8.27 ERA in 16.1 innings. Graveman was called back up to the A's on May 23. He finished his rookie season with a 6–9 record and 4.05 ERA in 21 starts.

On April 20, 2016, Graveman became the first pitcher to bat at the new Yankee Stadium and struck out after 3 pitches. Graveman batted in the clean-up spot, and became the first pitcher to bat clean-up since Babe Ruth in 1920. Graveman became the A's only consistent starter for the 2016 season, notching 10 wins in 31 starts.

With Sonny Gray starting the 2017 season on the DL with a lat strain, Graveman was chosen to start on opening day, the first opening day start of his career. He pitched six innings, struck out seven and took the win over the Los Angeles Angels. On April 17, 2017, Graveman was placed on the 10-day disabled list due to a right shoulder strain. His first game back with the A's, April 27, Graveman executed an unassisted double play. The previous such play made by an Oakland pitcher was on July 11, 1971, by Blue Moon Odom, who happened to be in attendance at Angel Stadium and witnessed Graveman make the play. After starting a couple of games after being activated, Graveman was placed again on the disabled list on May 29 due to shoulder soreness.

On March 20, Graveman was announced as the 2018 opening day starter for the second consecutive year. After starting the season 0–5 with an 8.89 ERA, Graveman was demoted to Triple-A on April 26. Graveman underwent Tommy John surgery on July 24, 2018. He was non-tendered by the Athletics on November 30, 2018, and became a free agent.

=== Chicago Cubs ===
Graveman signed a one-year contract with an option for the 2020 season with the Chicago Cubs on December 23, 2018. He missed the 2019 season while recovering from Tommy John surgery. He became a free agent after the season.

=== Seattle Mariners ===
On November 26, 2019, Graveman signed a one-year contract with the Seattle Mariners. Graveman made the Mariners Opening Day roster in 2020. On July 27, 2020, he made his Mariners debut.

On August 17, 2020, it was announced that Graveman had a benign bone tumor in his cervical spine. Following a nearly month-long stay on the injured list, he returned to the active roster as a relief pitcher, citing less stress/pain on the tumor as the reason for his conversion. Graveman finished the 2020 season with a 1–3 record and a 5.79 ERA in 11 games, including two starts.

On October 28, 2020, the Mariners declined their $3.5 million team option on his contract for the 2021 season, making him a free agent. He re-signed with the Mariners the following day on a one-year, $1.25 million contract with a reported $2.5 million in incentives which, if reached, would represent a slight raise from the team option had it been exercised.

In 30 appearances for the Mariners in 2021, Graveman was 4–0 with 10 saves and recorded a 0.82 ERA with 34 strikeouts in 33 innings.

=== Houston Astros ===
On July 27, 2021, Graveman was traded along with Rafael Montero to the Astros in exchange for Abraham Toro and Joe Smith. Graveman allowed no runs in six of his first seven appearances for the Astros, and struck out 32.2% of the batters he faced. On August 31, 2021, Graveman came into a scoreless game against the Mariners in the eighth inning. He loaded the bases on a walk, a single, and a hit by pitch, bringing Toro to the plate. On the eighth pitch of the at bat, Toro hit a grand slam to right-center field which accounted for all of the runs scored in the game.

With Houston in the second half of the 2021 season, Graveman was 1–1 with a 3.13 ERA, and struck out 27 batters in 23 innings. In Game 5 of the 2021 World Series, Graveman became the final MLB pitcher to record an at-bat, due to the adoption of the designated hitter by the National League prior to the start of the 2022 season. On November 3, 2021, Graveman was declared a free agent.

=== Chicago White Sox ===
On November 30, 2021, Graveman officially signed a three-year, $24 million contract with the Chicago White Sox. Overall in his first year with the White Sox, Graveman went 3–4 in 65 games with an ERA of 3.18 in 65 innings while striking out 66 and made six saves.

=== Houston Astros (second stint) ===
On July 28, 2023, Graveman was traded back to the Astros in exchange for catcher Korey Lee. In 23 games for Houston, he posted a 2.42 ERA with 24 strikeouts across 22 1/3 innings of work.

On January 16, 2024, Graveman underwent right shoulder surgery, with reports stating that he would likely miss the entirety of the season. Following the season, he elected free agency.

=== Arizona Diamondbacks ===
On February 17, 2025, Graveman signed a one-year, $1.35 million contract with the Arizona Diamondbacks. In 19 appearances for the Diamondbacks, he struggled to a 7.13 ERA with nine strikeouts across 17 2/3 innings pitched. Graveman was designated for assignment by Arizona on August 11. He was released by the Diamondbacks after clearing waivers the following day.

== Scouting report ==
Graveman is a sinkerballer pitcher, throwing his sinker 91–96 miles per hour (146–154 km/h). He also throws a cutter, a slider, and a changeup from a modified two-seam circle changeup grip.

== Personal life ==
Graveman and his wife, Victoria, have three daughters.
