= Arnold León =

Mexican baseball player (born 1988)

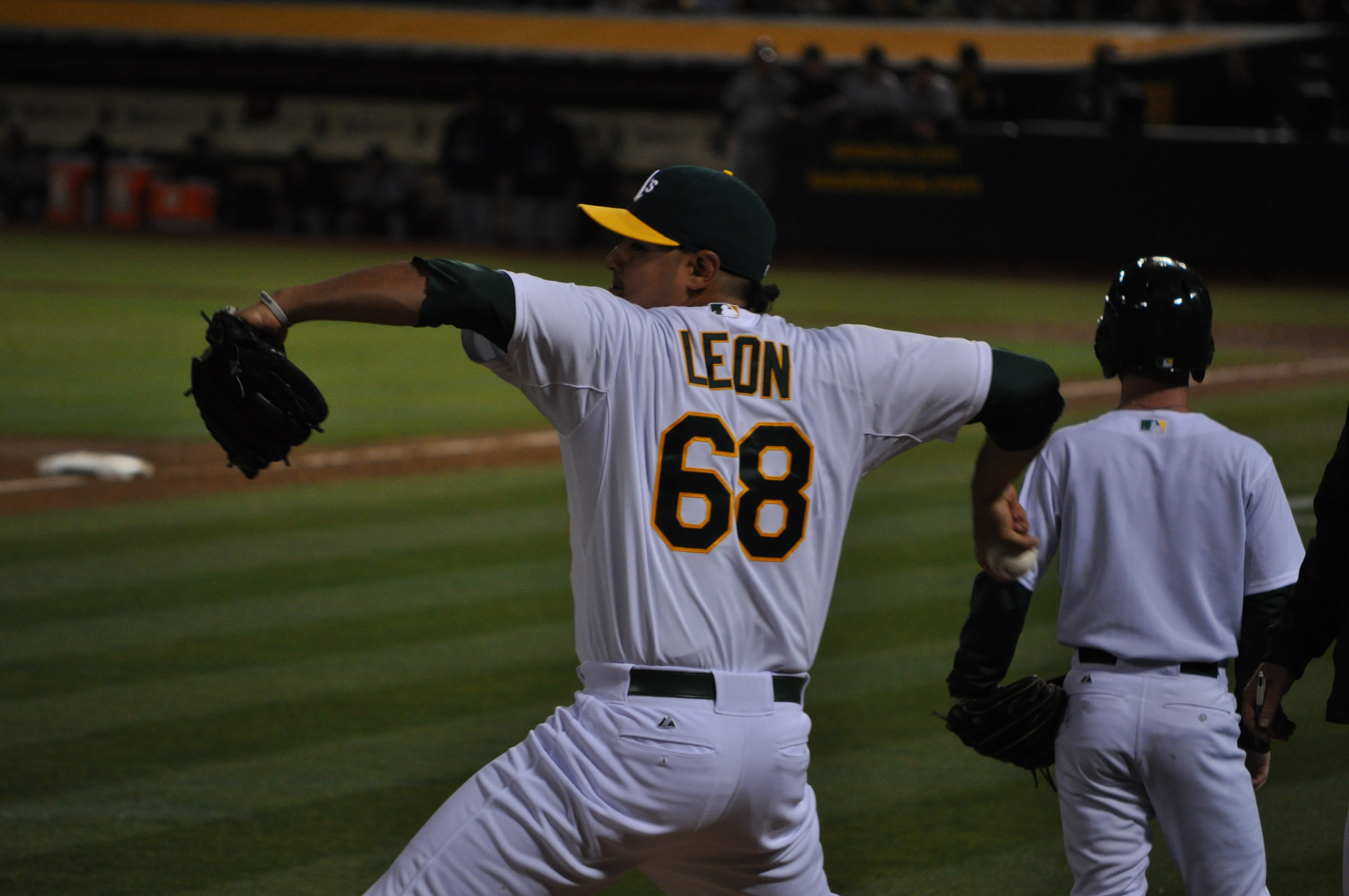
- Leon pitching for the Oakland Athletics in 2015
- Pitcher
- Born: September 6, 1988 (age 38); Culiacán, Sinaloa, Mexico
- Batted: Right Threw: Right

Professional debut
- MLB: April 22, 2015, for the Oakland Athletics
- KBO: May 26, 2016, for the Samsung Lions

Last appearance
- MLB: April 9, 2016, for the Toronto Blue Jays
- KBO: July 22, 2016, for the Samsung Lions

MLB statistics
- Win–loss record: 0–2
- Earned run average: 4.66
- Strikeouts: 21

KBO statistics
- Win–loss record: 0–1
- Earned run average: 11.25
- Strikeouts: 7
- Stats at Baseball Reference

Teams
- Oakland Athletics (2015); Toronto Blue Jays (2016); Samsung Lions (2016)

Alex Arnold León Navarro (born September 6, 1988) is a Mexican former professional baseball pitcher. He played in Major League Baseball (MLB) for the Oakland Athletics and Toronto Blue Jays, and in the KBO League for the Samsung Lions.

== Professional career ==
=== Saraperos de Saltillo ===
León made his professional baseball debut as a 17-year-old with the Saraperos de Saltillo of the Mexican League in 2006, pitching in 4 games as a reliever. He appeared in 35 games for Saltillo in 2007, posting a 3–0 win–loss record, 1.94 earned run average (ERA), and 38 strikeouts in 41 2/3 innings pitched. He then played in 30 games for the Tomateros de Culiacán of the Mexican Pacific League, pitching to a 6–0 record, 3.49 ERA, and 27 strikeouts in 28 1/3 innings.

=== Oakland Athletics ===
The Oakland Athletics purchased León's contract before the start of the 2008 minor league season, and he was assigned to the Advanced-A Stockton Ports. He made 20 relief appearances for Stockton in 2008, posting a 2.86 ERA and 28 strikeouts in 28 1/3 innings. León was assigned back to Saltillo on June 24, 2008, and played the rest of the minor league season there, going 2–1 with a 4.30 ERA in 13 games. He again played winter ball with the Tomateros de Culiacán, pitching 20 1/3 innings over 23 relief appearances.

In 2009, León was assigned to the Double-A Midland RockHounds for the entire minor league season. In 33 appearances, 7 of which were starts, he would post a 2–3 win–loss, 3.51 ERA, and 63 strikeouts in a then career-high 74 1/3 innings pitched. For the third consecutive season, León returned to the Mexican winter league, and pitched to a 2–0 record with a 4.15 ERA in 23 appearances. In 2010, he would pitch in 3 games for Midland before being placed on the disabled list, and would then undergo Tommy John surgery that would sideline him for the rest of the season. Having recovered from surgery, León made 5 starts for the Arizona League Athletics in 2011, posting an 8.53 ERA in 6 1/3 innings. He began the 2012 season with Stockton, later being promoted to Double-A Midland and the Triple-A Sacramento River Cats. In 44 total appearances, León would post a 4–1 win–loss record, 2.70 ERA, and 74 strikeouts in 66 2/3 innings.

León played for the Mexico national baseball team in the 2013 World Baseball Classic. In a first-round game against the Canada national baseball team, he started a brawl after hitting Rene Tosoni with a pitch following a bunt single by Chris Robinson. León was converted into a full-time starter during the 2013 minor league season, which he split between Double-A and Triple-A. In 25 total starts, he pitched to a 9–8 record, 4.12 ERA, and 97 strikeouts in 144 total innings. León played the entire 2014 season with Triple-A Sacramento, posting a 10–7 record, 4.97 ERA, and 128 strikeouts in 145 innings pitched. He was briefly promoted to the major leagues in May 2014, but returned to Triple-A without having made his MLB debut.

León made his MLB debut on April 22, 2015, through he would spend the majority of the season with the Nashville Sounds, which became Oakland's Triple-A affiliate following the 2014 season. In 20 appearances for Nashville, León pitched to a 2–5 record, 2.95 ERA, and 55 strikeouts. In 19 relief appearances for Oakland, León would post a 0–2 record, 4.39 ERA, and 19 strikeouts.

=== Toronto Blue Jays ===
On January 5, 2016, León was traded to the Toronto Blue Jays for cash considerations or a player to be named later. On March 30, John Gibbons announced that León had made the Opening Day roster, and would pitch out of the bullpen. He was designated for assignment on April 13. León cleared waivers on April 23, and was outrighted to the Triple-A Buffalo Bisons.

=== Samsung Lions ===
On May 18, 2016, Leon was acquired by the Samsung Lions of the KBO League and signed to a one-year, $500,000 contract.

=== Second stint with Saraperos de Saltillo ===
On May 1, 2018, León signed with the Saraperos de Saltillo of the Mexican League, the team with which he'd started his career.

=== Leones de Yucatán ===
León was traded to the Leones de Yucatán of the Mexican League on August 13, 2018. León did not play in a game in 2020 due to the cancellation of the Mexican League season because of the COVID-19 pandemic.

== Personal life ==
León and his wife, Cinthia, have three children.
