= Preston Tucker (baseball) =

American baseball player (born 1990)

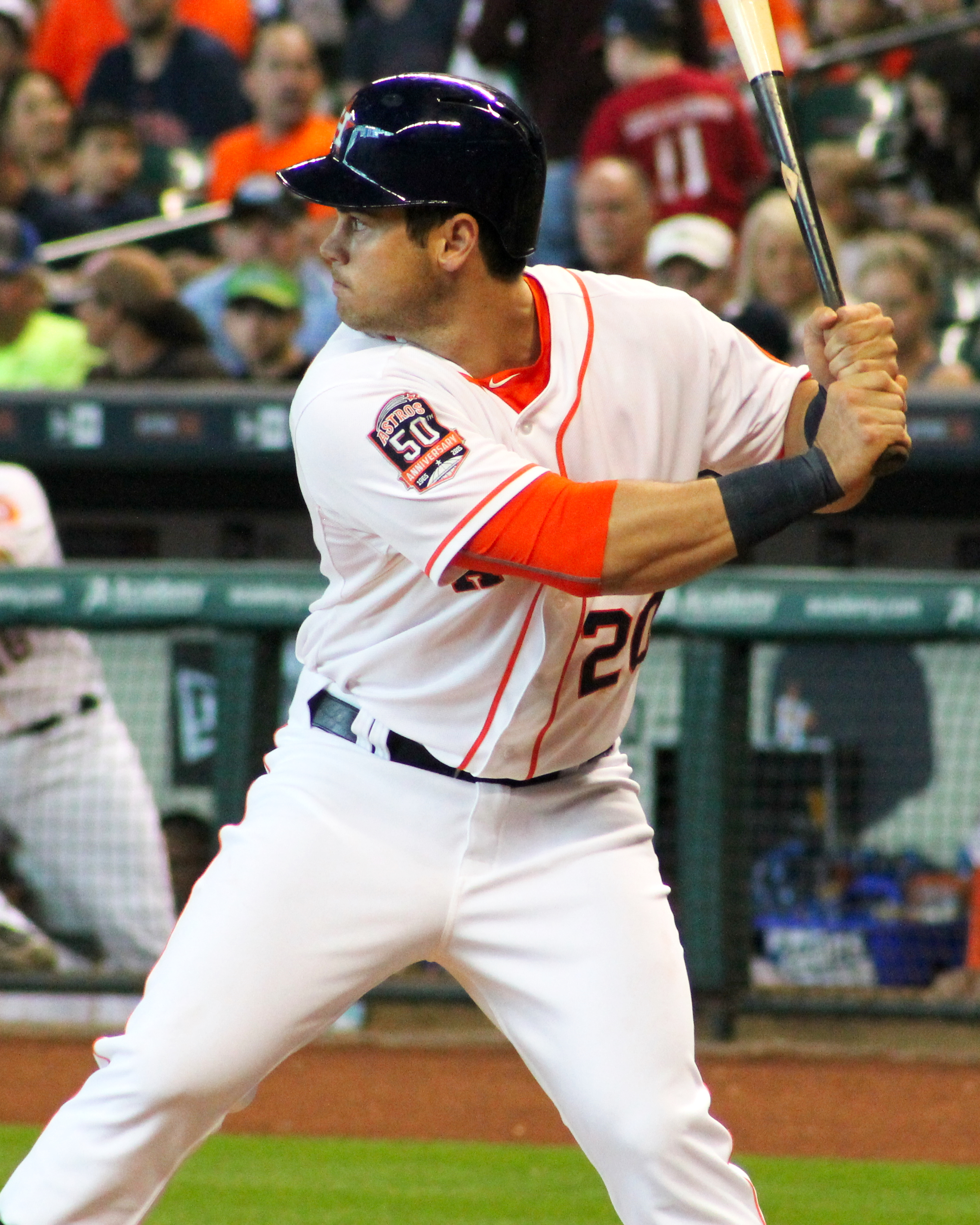
- Tucker with the Houston Astros
- Outfielder
- Born: July 6, 1990 (age 36); Tampa, Florida, U.S.
- Batted: Left Threw: Left

Professional debut
- MLB: May 7, 2015, for the Houston Astros
- KBO: May 17, 2019, for the Kia Tigers

Last appearance
- MLB: September 30, 2018, for the Atlanta Braves
- KBO: October 24, 2021, for the Kia Tigers

MLB statistics
- Batting average: .222
- Home runs: 23
- Runs batted in: 68

KBO statistics
- Batting average: .294
- Home runs: 46
- Runs batted in: 195
- Stats at Baseball Reference

Teams
- Houston Astros (2015–2016); Atlanta Braves (2018); Cincinnati Reds (2018); Atlanta Braves (2018); Kia Tigers (2019–2021)

Preston Michael Tucker (born July 6, 1990) is an American former professional baseball outfielder. He played in Major League Baseball (MLB) for the Houston Astros, Cincinnati Reds, and Atlanta Braves, and in the KBO League for the Kia Tigers. He stands 6 feet 0 inches (1.83 m) tall, and weighs 210 pounds (95 kg).

== Amateur career ==
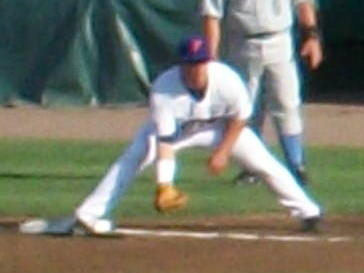
Tucker playing first base at the 2010 CWS

Tucker attended Henry B. Plant High School in Tampa, Florida. He enrolled at the University of Florida and played college baseball for the Florida Gators baseball team from 2009 to 2012. As a freshman, he was the National Collegiate Baseball Writers Association Freshman Hitter of the Year and the Southeastern Conference Co-Freshman of the Year. In 2010, he played collegiate summer baseball with the Orleans Firebirds of the Cape Cod Baseball League. He set school records for most hits with 341, runs batted in (RBIs) with 258 and at-bats with 1,035. He finished second in school history with 57 home runs and batted .329. Tucker was drafted by the Colorado Rockies in the 16th round of the 2011 Major League Baseball draft, but did not sign and returned to Florida.

== Professional career ==
=== Houston Astros ===
The Houston Astros selected Tucker in the seventh round of the 2012 Major League Baseball draft. Tucker started his professional career with the Tri-City ValleyCats of the Class A-Short Season New York–Penn League, hitting .321/.390/.509 with eight home runs and 38 RBIs in 42 games. He started the 2013 season with the Lancaster JetHawks of the Class A-Advanced California League, and was promoted to the Corpus Christi Hooks of the Class AA Texas League after hitting .326/.384/.544 with 15 home runs in 75 games. In 60 games with Corpus Christi he hit .262/.347/.456 with 10 home runs.

Tucker began the 2015 season with the Fresno Grizzlies of the Class AAA Pacific Coast League (PCL). With George Springer suffering a concussion on May 6, the Astros promoted Tucker to the major leagues the next day. On May 7, 2015, Tucker got his first major league hit; a double into right field that tied the score at two and became part of a wild comeback in the 9th inning against the Los Angeles Angels at Angel Stadium against the closer Huston Street. In the game, he went 1-for-3 with one RBI and a walk. On May 21, 2015, Tucker hit his first major league home run in a game against the Detroit Tigers. The solo shot came in the top of the ninth inning off Tigers' closer Joakim Soria, tying the game at 5–5 and handing Soria his first blown save of the season.

On March 28, 2017, the Astros optioned Tucker back to Fresno. He spent the entire 2017 season in Triple-A without making a single appearance in the majors, although he was still on the Astros 40-man roster that year.

On December 15, 2017, the Astros designated Tucker for assignment.

=== Atlanta Braves ===
The Astros traded him to the Atlanta Braves on December 20, 2017, for cash considerations or a player to be named later.

=== Cincinnati Reds ===
On July 30, 2018, the Braves traded Tucker, Lucas Sims, and Matt Wisler to the Cincinnati Reds in exchange for Adam Duvall.

=== Atlanta Braves (second stint) ===
On September 2, 2018, the Reds traded Tucker back to Atlanta in exchange for cash considerations. The Braves outrighted him to the minors on October 31, and he elected free agency on November 2.

=== Chicago White Sox ===
On February 23, 2019, Tucker signed a minor league deal with the Chicago White Sox that included an invitation to spring training. On May 10, 2019, Tucker requested his release so he could sign with the Kia Tigers of the KBO League.

=== Kia Tigers ===
On May 17, 2019, Tucker signed a one-year, $270,000 contract with the Kia Tigers of the KBO League. Tucker played in 95 games for Kia in 2019, slashing .311/.381/.479 with 9 home runs and 50 RBI. He re-signed with the club for the 2020 season on a one-year, $850,000 deal. In 2020, Tucker swatted 32 home runs with 113 RBI and a slash line of .306/.398/.557 in 142 games for the Tigers. On December 8, 2020, Tucker re-signed with the Tigers again, on a one-year, $1.05 million deal. Tucker endured a down season in 2021, hitting just .237/.334/.350 with 9 home runs and 59 RBI in 127 games for Kia. Following the season, on November 30, 2021, the Tigers parted ways with Tucker.

=== Atlanta Braves (third stint) ===
On March 31, 2022, Tucker signed a minor league contract with the Atlanta Braves organization. In 75 games for the Triple–A Gwinnett Stripers, he batted .267/.347/.426 with 9 home runs and 47 RBI. Tucker elected free agency following the season on November 10.

=== San Diego Padres ===
On December 9, 2022, Tucker signed a minor league deal with an invite to spring training with the San Diego Padres. In 44 games for the Triple–A El Paso Chihuahuas, he hit .342/.468/.658 with 10 home runs and 36 RBI. On June 18, 2023, the Padres selected Tucker's contract to the 40-man roster; San Diego subsequently placed him on the 10–day injured list with plantar fasciitis in his right foot. On August 1, Tucker was designated for assignment following the team's acquisition of Garrett Cooper and Sean Reynolds. Two days later, he was released by the Padres organization.

== Personal life ==
Tucker's younger brother, Kyle, played baseball at Plant High, and was selected by the Astros with the fifth overall selection of the 2015 MLB draft. Preston Tucker was married to Haley Walters in January 2022.
