= 2015 Houston Astros season =

54th season in Major League Baseball for the Houston Astros

2015 Houston Astros
- American League Wild Card winners
- League: American League
- Division: West
- Ballpark: Minute Maid Park
- City: Houston, Texas
- Record: 86–76 (.531)
- Divisional place: 2nd
- Owners: Jim Crane
- General managers: Jeff Luhnow
- Managers: A. J. Hinch
- Television: Root Sports Southwest; KUBE-TV (Bill Brown, Alan Ashby, Geoff Blum, Julia Morales)
- Radio: Sportstalk 790 (Robert Ford, Steve Sparks, Milo Hamilton); KLAT (Spanish) (Francisco Romero, Alex Treviño)
- Stats: ESPN.com; Baseball Reference

The 2015 Houston Astros season was the 54th season for the Major League Baseball (MLB) franchise located in Houston, Texas, their 51st as the Astros, third in both the American League (AL) and AL West division, and 16th season at Minute Maid Park. They entered the season having finished in fourth place in the AL West with a 70–92 record, breaking a string of three consecutive seasons with at least 106 losses, and most successful season to date since joining the American League.

The 2015 season was the first for A. J. Hinch as manager, the 23rd in Astros' franchise history, succeeding Tom Lawless. On April 6, Dallas Keuchel made his first Opening Day start for Houston, who hosted the Cleveland Indians and triumphed, 2–0. In the first round of the June MLB draft, the Astros selected third baseman Alex Bregman at number 2 overall and outfielder Kyle Tucker at number 5.

The Astros sent Dallas Keuchel and Jose Altuve to the AL All-Star squad. Keuchel was named starting pitcher for the AL, while Altuve was voted as starting second baseman. Craig Biggio became the first player to be inducted into the Baseball Hall of Fame as an Astro on July 29, along with former teammate Randy Johnson. On August 21, Mike Fiers tossed the 11th no-hitter in club history, and first at Minute Maid Park, against the Los Angeles Dodgers.

With an 86–76 record—their first winning season since 2008—and second-place finish in the AL West, the Astros made the playoffs for the first time since their World Series appearance in 2005, and first as members of the American League. It was the tenth postseason and third wild card qualification overall in franchise history. Houston defeated the New York Yankees in the AL Wild Card (ALWC) Game before taking the eventual World Series champion Kansas City Royals to five games in the American League Division Series (ALDS), nearly pulling off a major upset.

Keuchel became the AL Cy Young Award winner after leading the AL in games won (20–8), innings (232), and walks plus hits per inning (1.017, WHIP), and finished second in earned run average (2.48 ERA). Keuchel and Altuve were named AL Gold Glove Award winners. Altuve, the AL hits (200) and stolen bases (38) leader each for a second consecutive season, ranked third in batting (.313) to also claim a Silver Slugger Award. Meanwhile, shortstop Carlos Correa was named AL Rookie of the Year.

== Offseason ==
=== Summary ===
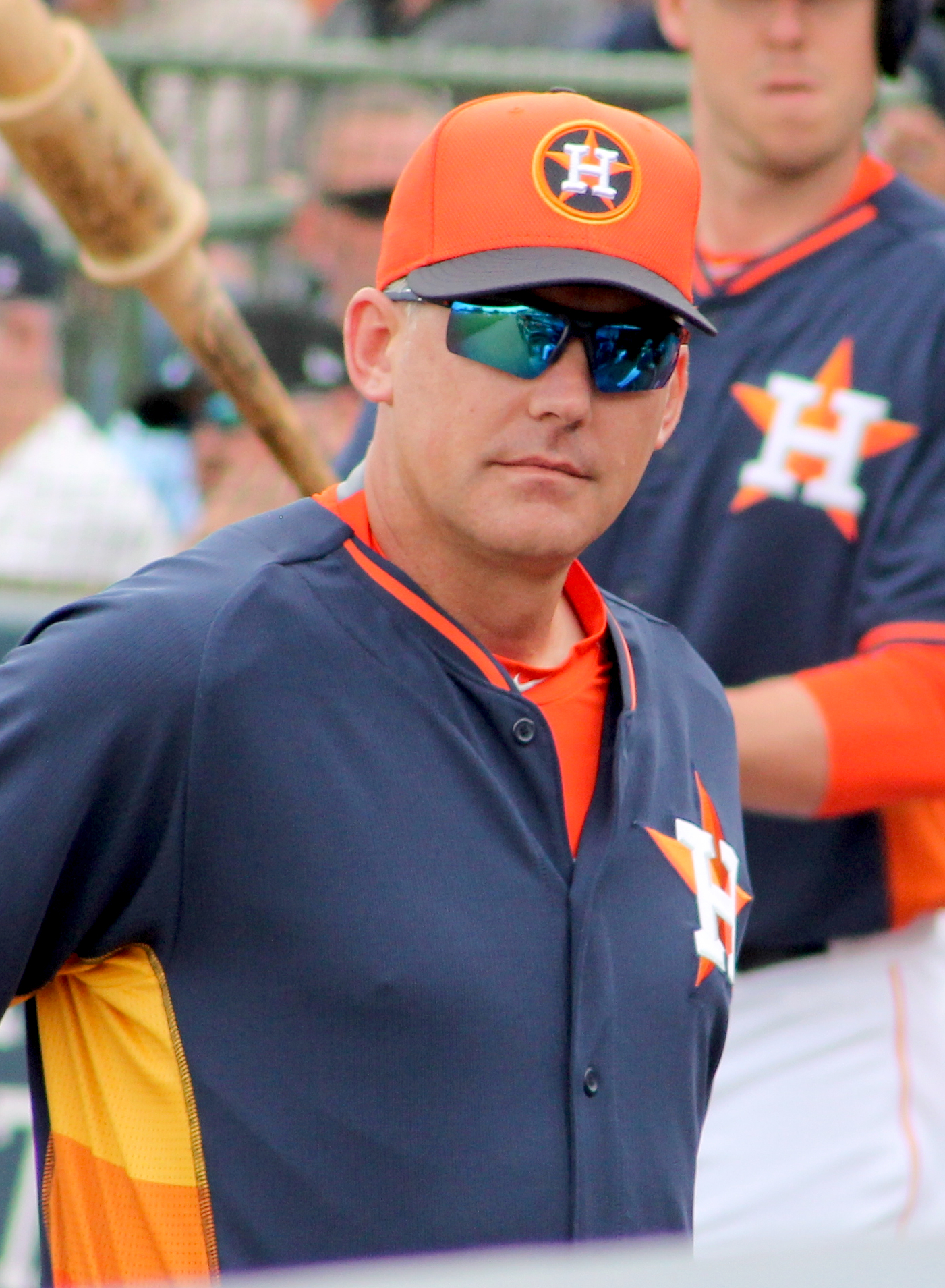
The Astros hired A. J. Hinch as 23rd manager in team history, succeeding Tom Lawless.

The Astros concluded the 2014 season with a 70–92 (.432) record, in fourth place in the AL West division, and 28 games behind the division-champion Los Angeles Angels of Anaheim. The 70 victories represented a 19-game improvement from the year prior, which had ended in a team record-setting number of losses at 51–111 (.315), also halting three consecutive seasons each with at least 106 losses and a last-place finish. Houston missed the postseason for the ninth consecutive season since playing in the 2005 World Series, while their most recent winning season had occurred in 2008, at 86–75 (.534).

Second baseman Jose Altuve became the Astros' first ever batting champion (.341) and first hitter to lead the Major Leagues in hits (225), and second to lead his own league, joining José Cruz, who paced the National League in 1983. Altuve became a Silver Slugger Award winner for the first time, and joined Craig Biggio as the second Houston Astros second baseman (1994 to 1997) to be recognized. Left-hander Dallas Keuchel became both a Fielding Bible and Gold Glove Award winner for the first time.

On September 29, 2014, the Astros announced the hiring of A. J. Hinch as the 23rd manager in franchise history, succeeding interim manager Tom Lawless, who had replaced Bo Porter, fired on September 1, 2014.

On January 6, 2015, results for the National Baseball Hall of Fame and Museum voting revealed that Craig Biggio had been inducted on his third ballot, becoming the first Houston Astro to be so honored. He spent his entire professional career as an Astro, from being drafted to retirement, including 20 major league seasons, and held a number of team records and exclusive major league achievements, such as reaching the 3,000-hit club (3,060 total). He is the only player in MLB history to reach 3,000 hits, 600 doubles, 250 home runs, and 400 stolen bases. Biggio's teammate from the 1998 season, pitcher Randy Johnson, was also elected to the Baseball Hall of Fame.

==== Transactions ====
Free agents

Major League free agents

Luke Gregerson (RHP) Oakland Athletics	Incoming free agents Contracts expired after 2014 World Series	Signed with Houston Astros December 10, 2014 3 years, $18.5 million
Pat Neshek (RHP) St. Louis Cardinals	Incoming free agents Contracts expired after 2014 World Series	Signed with Houston Astros December 10, 2014 2 years, $12.5 million
Jed Lowrie (SS) Oakland Athletics	Incoming free agents Contracts expired after 2014 World Series	Signed with Houston Astros December 14, 2014 3 years, $23 million
Colby Rasmus (OF) Toronto Blue Jays	Incoming free agents Contracts expired after 2014 World Series	Signed with Houston Astros January 20, 2015 1 year, $8 million
Club option held
Matt Albers (RHP)	Astros becoming free agents following options decisions October 9, 2014 Option declined	Signed with Chicago White Sox February 13, 2015 1 year (minors)
Outrighted off roster
José Cisnero (RHP)	Became free agent November 3, 2014	Signed with Cincinnati Reds November 18, 2014 1 year (minors)

Amateur free agents
March 2	RHP	José Urquidy	(Mexico)
March 18	RHP	Cristian Javier	(Dominican Republic)
March 19	LHP	Framber Valdez	(Dominican Republic)

40 man roster moves (non-free agents)

40-man roster moves (non-free agents)
Transaction date	Player	Pos.	Prior organization	Roster move	Gaining organization	Ref.
November 3, 2014	Will Harris	RHP	Arizona Diamondbacks	Waiver claim	Houston Astros	

Trades

2014—15 offseason
November 5, 2014	To Houston Astros Hank Conger (C)	To Los Angeles Angels of Anaheim Nick Tropeano (RHP) Carlos Pérez (C)
January 15, 2015	To Houston Astros Evan Gattis (C/LF) James Hoyt (RHP)	To Atlanta Braves Mike Foltynewicz (RHP) Andrew Thurman (RHP) Rio Ruiz (3B)
January 19, 2015	To Houston Astros Luis Valbuena (IF) Dan Straily (RHP)	To Chicago Cubs Dexter Fowler (CF)

== Spring training ==
After a five-year gap in contact with the Astros organization, former first baseman Jeff Bagwell accepted a formal invitation from Hinch to be a guest instructor in spring training.

== Regular season ==
=== Summary ===
Just two years removed from a 111-loss season, the Astros unexpectedly rebounded to start the 2015 season at 18–7 while occupying first place in the AL West for 139 days.

==== April ====
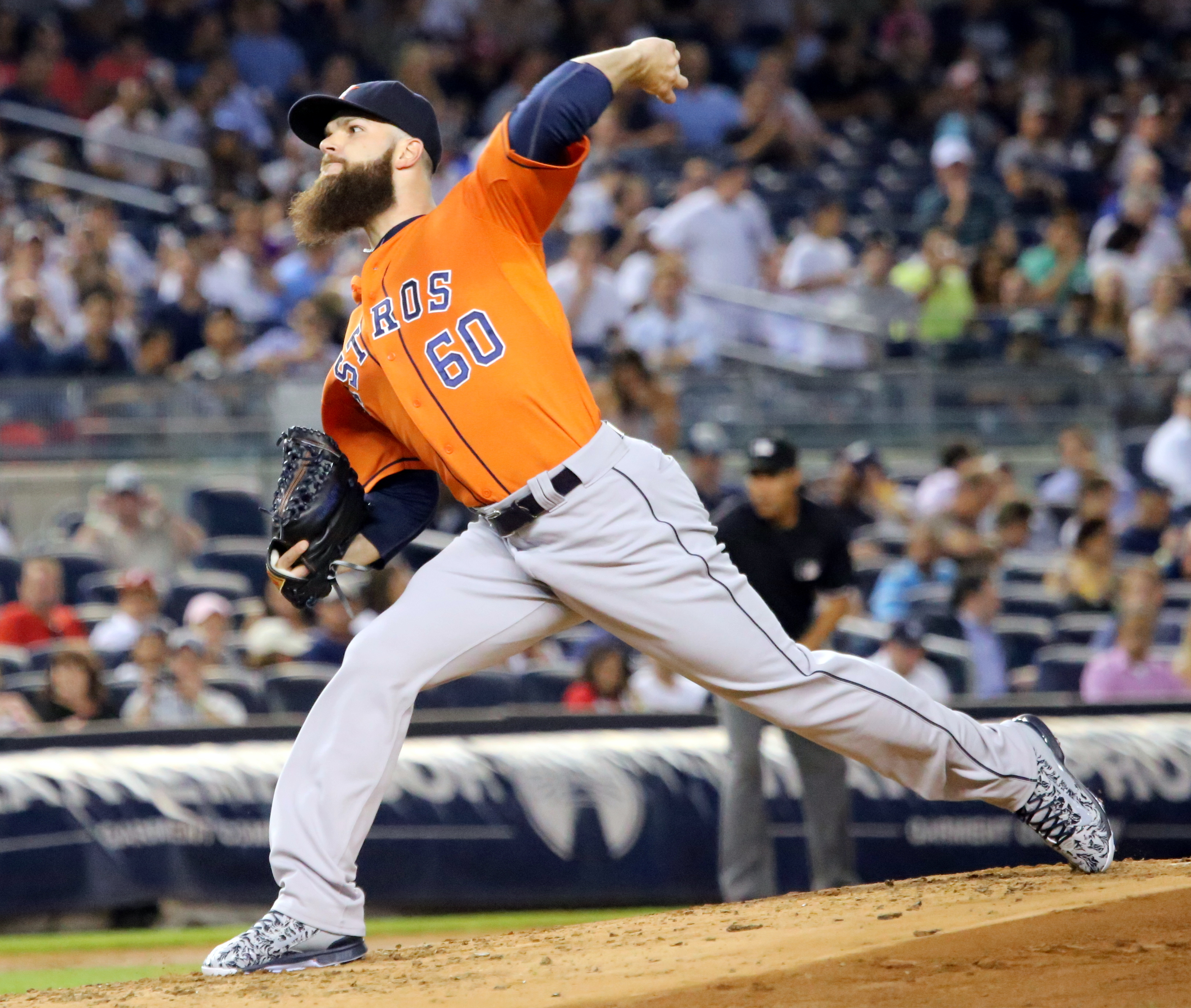
Dallas Keuchel was the Astros' Opening Day starting pitcher and would become the club's third Cy Young Award winner.

Opening Day starting lineup
Uniform	Player	Position	Starts
27	Jose Altuve	Second baseman	4
4	George Springer	Right fielder	2
18	Luis Valbuena	Third baseman	1
11	Evan Gattis	Designated hitter	1
23	Chris Carter	First baseman	1
15	Jason Castro	Catcher	4
8	Jed Lowrie	Shortstop	1
28	Colby Rasmus	Left fielder	1
6	Jake Marisnick	Center fielder	1
60	Dallas Keuchel	Pitcher	1
Venue: Minute Maid Park • Final: Houston 2, Cleveland 0 Sources:

On Opening Day, April 6, the Astros hosted the Cleveland Indians, where southpaw Dallas Keuchel made his first Opening Day start for Houston, opposite reigning Cy Young Award winner Corey Kluber. Both hurlers tossed at least 7 innings with just three hits surrendered; however, Keuchel led Houston to a 2–0 combined shutout triumph. In the bottom of the sixth, Jose Altuve singled, purloined second base, and scored on George Springer's run batted in (RBI)-single for Houston's first run of the campaign. Tony Sipp worked the eighth with two whiffs to earn the hold, followed by closer Luke Gregerson, who got the final three outs to convert the save.

Right-hander Asher Wojciechowski (0–1) made his major league debut on April 9, starting the bout and ceding four runs on eight hits in four-plus innings as the Astros fell to Cleveland, 5–1. However, Wojciechowski was nearly juxtaposed on the losing end of a combined no-hitter started by Trevor Bauer (1–0), followed by Kyle Crockett, Scott Atchison, and Nick Hagadone. With out in the bottom of the ninth, Jed Lowrie's home run broke up the no-hit and shutout bids. Though the Astros lineup coxed seven base on balls, they were struck out 16 times, including a career-high of 11 by Bauer.

On April 14, right fielder George Springer's over-the-wall catch robbed Leonys Martín of a walk-off grand slam in the 10th inning at Globe Life Field in Arlington. The Astros won, 6–4, over the Texas Rangers in 14 innings.

For the month of April, Keuchel was recognized as the AL's Pitcher of the Month, having produced a 3–0 win–loss record (W–L) and an 0.73 earned run average (ERA) over five games started. Keuchel became Houston's first Pitcher of the Month Award winner since Wandy Rodríguez in July 2009.

==== May ====
Catalyzed by Evan Gattis' two-home run game on May 3, the Astros clinched an 8–7 triumph over the Seattle Mariners. The win, which moved the Astros to 18–7 on the season, introduced a new franchise record over their first 25 games of the season. Meanwhile, Altuve batted .467 (14-for-30), seven runs, eight RBI, five doubles, and one home run, while sharing AL Player of the Week honors with Josh Reddick of the Oakland Athletics on May 3. Altuve also enjoyed an 11-game hitting streak that spanned April 21—May 2.

On May 6, Will Harris surrendered a seventh inning home run to Carlos Peguero—one of two by Peguero—as the Rangers won, 11–3. The home run snapped Harris' scoreless innings streak at 28 2/3 over 26 games, the longest-active in the majors. Adrián Beltré fell a home run short of hitting for the cycle while starter Colby Lewis (2–2) tossed 8 innings with one run allowed as the Rangers swept the three-game set following the Astros' 10 straight winning series. Samuel Deduno (0–1), making his second start for Houston after five appearances in relief, took the loss after yielding career-highs of 11 hits and 10 runs in 4 2/3 innings.

After Springer suffered a concussion, the Astros selected outfielder Preston Tucker from Fresno to the major league roster on May 6, and he made his major league debut the following day, versus the Los Angeles Angels of Anaheim. Trailing 2–0 going into the ninth inning, Angels closer Huston Street (2–1) allowed consecutive run-scoring singles to Jake Marisnick and Tucker. It was also Tucker's first major league hit, which he augmented by drawing a walk. Altuve beat a potential inning-ending double play to score Jonathan Villar for the decisive run as the Astros came back to win, 3–2.

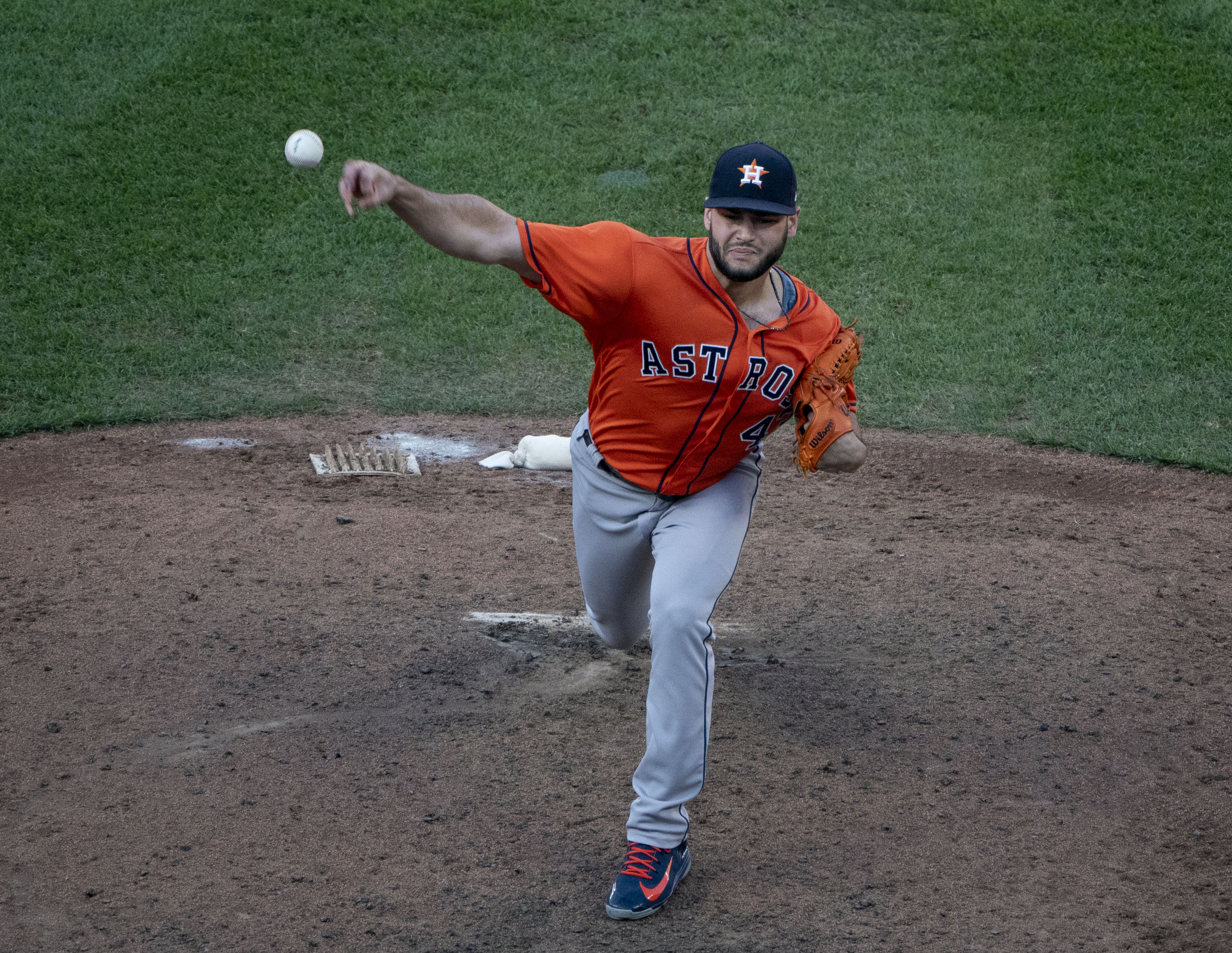
Lance McCullers Jr. made his major league debut in 2015.

Lance McCullers Jr. made his major league debut on May 18 as the starting pitcher versus the Oakland Athletics, surrendering one run, three hits, three walks, and struck out five over 4 2/3 innings. In the sixth, Brett Lawrie hit a tie-breaking RBI single and the Oakland bullpen tossed 4 2/3 scoreless frames to hold on to a 2–1 win. They improved to 2–13 in one-run games to snap a four-game losing streak while ending the Astros' five-game winning streak. McCullers earned his first major league win on May 23 to lead a 3–2 win over the Detroit Tigers, backed by a 5–4–3 triple play.

For the month of May, Keuchel repeated as AL Pitcher of the Month, becoming the first pitcher since Johan Santana won two monthly awards in 2004. Moreover, Keuchel joined Randy Johnson (1998) and Andy Pettitte (2005)—also lefties—as the only Astros hurlers to win the award more than once during the same season. Keuchel went 4–1 W–L in six May starts, produced a 2.62 ERA and 38 strikeouts in 44 2/3 innings while surrendering a .223 batting average against, and closed the month with successive complete games, including a four-hit, 11-strikeout shutout of the White Sox at Minute Maid Park. He tied for first in complete games for the month, tied for fourth in wins, and ranked eighth in strikeouts and ninth in ERA.

==== June ====
On June 3, the Astros overcame the Baltimore Orioles, 3–1, led by McCullers' first career complete game in his fourth start to go along with a first-time 11 strikeouts. Chris Carter led the Astros offense with home runs in the second and fifth innings for his 11th career multi-home run game and extend a season-high 11-game hitting streak. George Springer hit another home run in the sixth as the Astros improved to 21–0 in multi-home run games. This win set another record start in franchise history at 34–20.

Chris Colabello extended his career-best 17-game hitting streak on June 7 with two hits, one of which was a walk-off two-run single off Gregerson (0–1), as the Astros fell to the Torontop Blue Jays, 7–6, sweeping the three-game set. José Bautista hit two home runs for Toronto. In the eighth inning, Pat Neshek issued a two-out base on balls to Justin Smoak which ended 24 consecutive appearances without a walk, the second-longest streak to open a season in major league history. (Note: The longest was 30, accomplished by Mark Eichhorn while with the 1991 Angels.) The Astros lost for the first time in 30 games when leading after 8 innings.

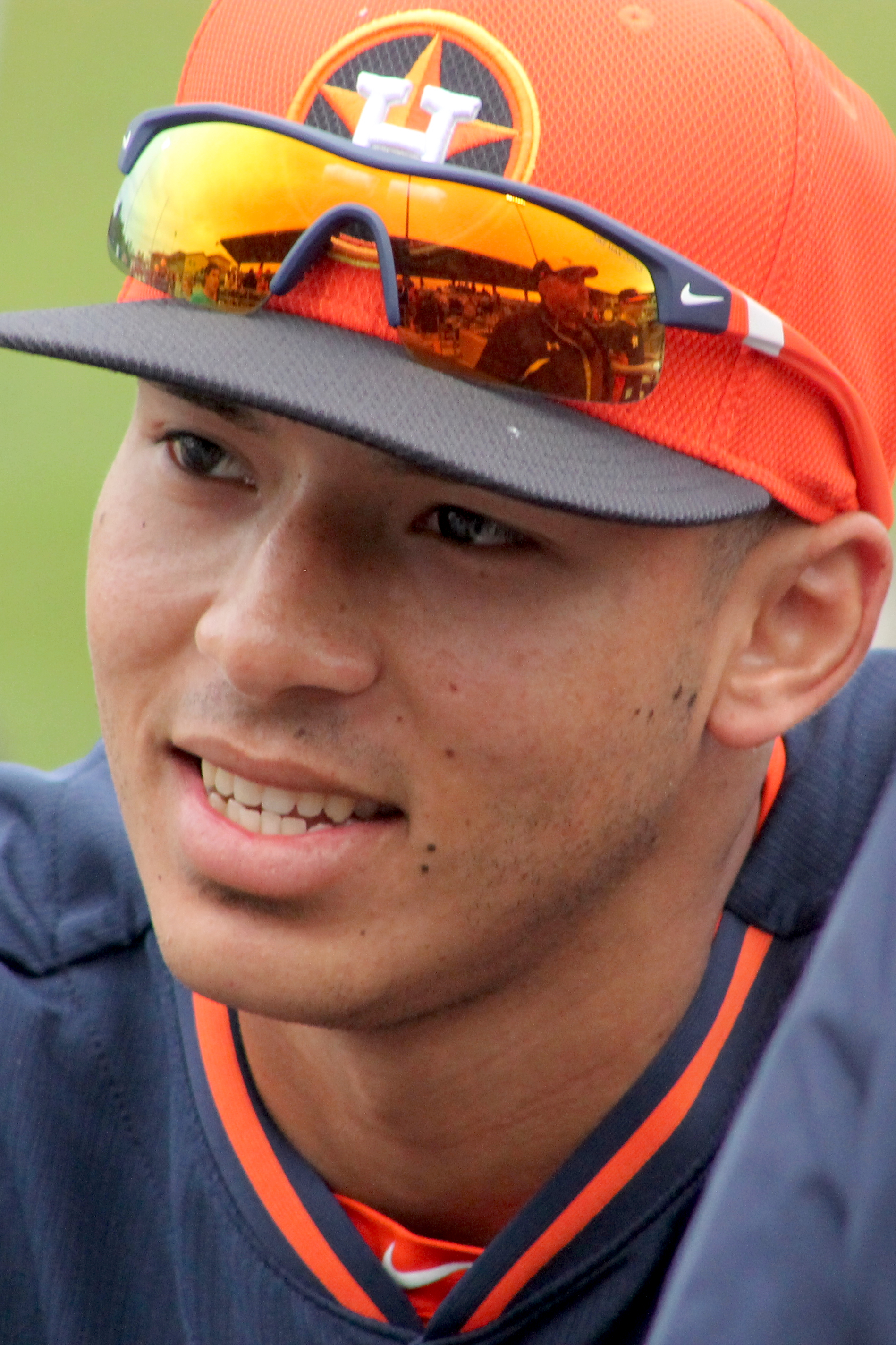
Carlos Correa, the 2012 draft number 1 selection, made his debut in 2015.

The Astros promoted two top prospects on June 8: shortstop Carlos Correa, whom they selected first overall in the 2012 MLB draft, as the youngest player in the league. and right-hander Vince Velasquez, after just five starts at Double-A Corpus Christi. Correa debuted at U. S. Cellular Field in a 3–1 loss to the Chicago White Sox, going 1-for-4 and collected an RBI single off Chris Sale. Though he struck out 14 Astros in that outing, Correa avoided a fate as one of the victims.

Also on June 8, the Astros first-round selections in the MLB draft included shortstop Alex Bregman from Louisiana State University at number 2 overall, and outfielder Kyle Tucker, younger brother of Preston, from Plant High School in Tampa, Florida, at number five overall.

On June 9, Correa singled in the sixth against Chicago and stole his first base before hitting his first MLB home run off Zach Duke in the ninth inning.

On June 10, Velasquez made his major league debut, stifling Chicago over five shutout innings, and Springer attained his first career five-hit game. Velasquez became just the third Astro to feature five or more scoreless innings his major league debut, (Note: Previously accomplished by Carlos Hernández (2001) and Jarred Cosart (2013).) while Springer's five hits was the first for an Astro since Brandon Barnes on July 19, 2013. (Note: Barnes hit for the cycle in this game.) In spite of these achievements, the White Sox homered in each of the sixth, seventh, and eighth innings for a 4–1 decision over Houston and three-game sweep, running the Astros' losing streak to a season-high seven. What was a 6-game AL West lead shrunk to 2 games with this loss.

Powered by home runs from the quartet of Tucker, Correa, Jake Marisnick, and Carter, the Astros ended June 17 victorious at Coors Field, 8–4. Correa's three hits tallied 14 since his call-up to set a franchise record over the first nine games of a career. With three stolen bases versus the Colorado Rockies in his tenth MLB game on June 18, Correa became the second-youngest player to do so over the preceding century, trailing only Rickey Henderson by 21 days.

Correa hit his fourth home run in just 15 games, and Luis Valbuena went deep twice to power a 13–3 win over the Los Angeles Angels on June 23. Also collecting his 20th hit, Correa surpassed a franchise mark of 19 shared by Doug Rader (1967) and Josh Anderson (2007) for hits in their first 15 games. Collin McHugh (8–3) worked a season-high eight innings, yielding two runs on nine hits.

Dallas Keuchel pitched a six-hit shutout and struck out a career-best 12 on June 25 to lead the Astros over the New York Yankees, 4–0. Jose Altuve collected three hits and scored three runs, and Evan Gattis hit an RBI single in the sixth and an RBI double in the eighth.

On June 28, Correa doubled twice and scored the tie-breaking run on a triple by Evan Gattis in the seventh inning to help lead the Astros over the Yankees, 3–1. Collin McHugh (9–3) was touched for a season-low two hits and struck out eight over eight innings before Luke Gregerson tossed a perfect ninth inning to convert his 18th save. Having hit nine doubles and five homers over his first 20 major league games, Correa's doubles total in that timeframe set an Astros record and he also joined Springer, Bagwell, and Rusty Staub as the only players in franchise history to reach safely in 18 or more of their first 20 games. The 14 extra base hits in the same span also tied Correa with three others behind Chris Dickerson for most in MLB since 1993.

After batting .287 with four stolen bases, five home runs, nine doubles and 15 RBI in 21 games in June, Correa was named AL Rookie of the Month. He led AL rookies in doubles, RBI, and slugging percentage (.852). Correa became the sixth Astro to receive the monthly award, joining teammates McHugh, winner for the previous September, and Springer, who won in May 2014.

==== July ====
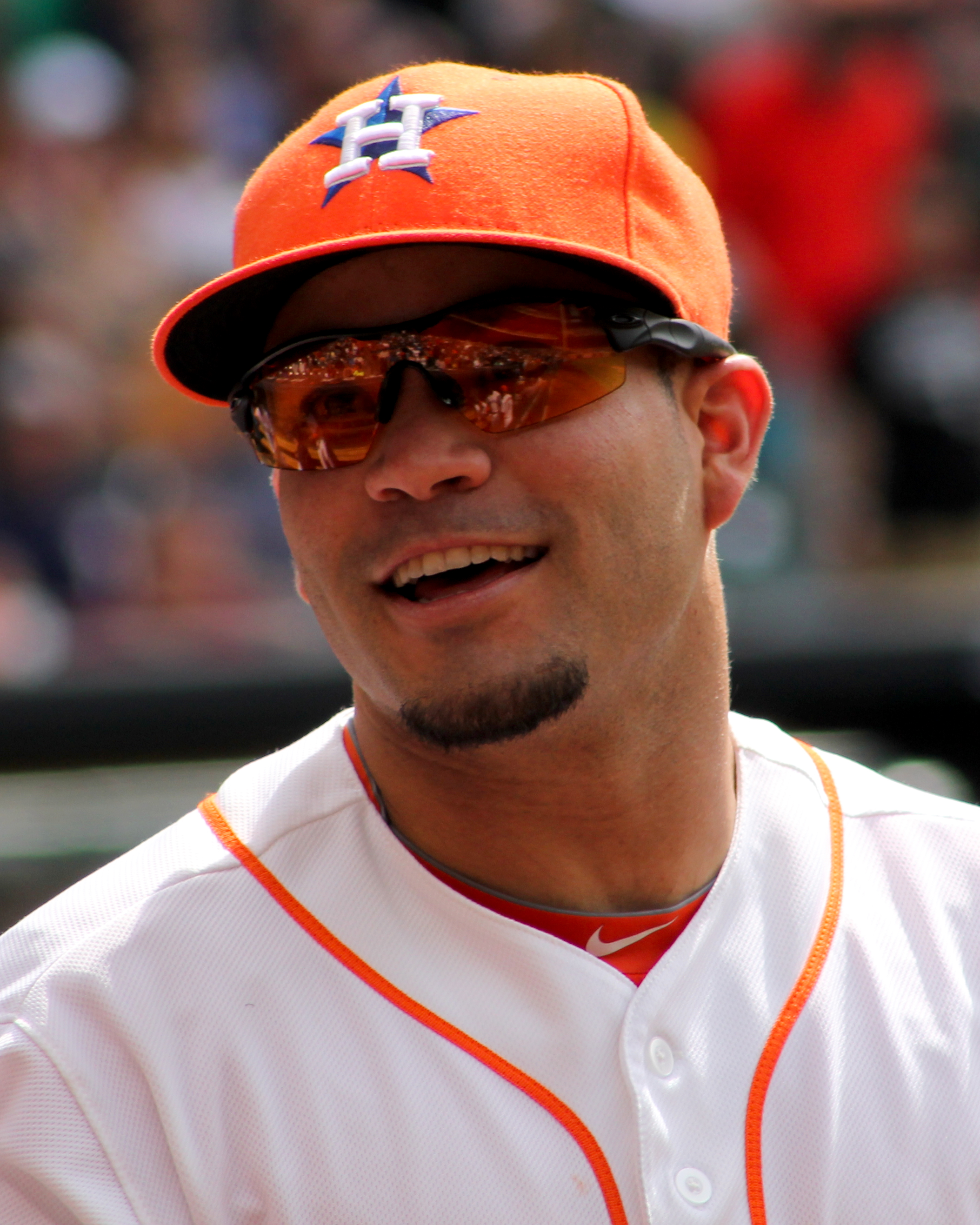
Jose Altuve became the third Astro to be voted as starting second baseman in the All-Star Game.

For the first time in has career, Altuve was voted as starting second baseman in the MLB All-Star Game for the American League at Great American Ball Park, suprassing Omar Infante of the Kansas City Royals by more than 600,000 votes. His third career selection, Altuve joined Biggio and Jeff Kent as Astros voted as All-Star Game starters at second base. Meanwhile, Keuchel was chosen as the AL starting pitcher, becoming the fourth Astro to become an All-Star Game starting pitcher. Keuchel joined the ranks of J. R. Richard (1980), Mike Scott (1987), and Roger Clemens (2004).

Longtime Houston Astro Craig Biggio, who was a Hall of Fame electee for the class of 2015, delivered an induction speech on July 29, 2015, that can be seen here. Randy Johnson, who spent the latter part of the 1998 season in Houston, pitched some of the best baseball of his career including a 1.28 ERA and four shutouts, made his Hall of fame speech.

The Astros traded for Scott Kazmir from the Athletics on July 23, returning catcher Jacob Nottingham and pitcher Daniel Mengden. Kazmir produced stellar results for Oakland in 2015, posting a 2.38 ERA over 109 2/3 innings, 45.9% groundball rate, 8.3 strikeouts per nine innings (K/9) and 2.9 walks per nine innings (BB/9).

With one out in the bottom of the ninth on July 23, Altuve's walk-off home run gave the Astros a 5–4 victory over the Boston Red Sox, the final of his four hits. Colby Rasmus and Marwin González also connected for Houston. Josh Fields (3–1) worked the ninth to pick up the win.

Kazmir won his Astros debut on July 24, hurling seven scoreless innings versus Kansas City while allowing three hits and a walk to lead a 4–0 win

Correa's first-inning blast on July 28 ignited a 10–5 win over the Angels. His ninth home run, Correa became the first shortstop since 1914 to hit as many over his first 42 games while overtaking Marcus Semien for the AL lead at shortstop. It was also Correa's seventh 3-hit game to lead AL rookies.

On July 30, Kazmir, a Houston native, made his first home start, allowing three hits and striking out five over 7 2/3 scoreless innings. Angels starter Matt Shoemaker was as brilliant, allowing seven hits over seven shutout innings. Valbuena made his first professional start at first base as Jed Lowrie returned from the disabled list and played third. Both teams remained scoreless through eight innings. Jason Castro hit a walk-off, three-run home run with two outs in the bottom of the ninth to secure a 3–0 win and three-game sweep of the Angels.

The continuation of an outstanding month of July after being acquired, Kazmir produced a 0.26 ERA and 24 strikeouts in 34 innings over five starts split with Oakland and Houston on the way to being named AL Pitcher of the Month for the second time in his career. Kazmir also joined Keuchel for the third time on the season for Astros pitching. The third-lowest July ERA in MLB history, Kazmir surrendered no home runs, and batters managed just a .134 average against.

==== August ====
Behind a pair of two-home run games from Hank Conger and Carlos Correa on August 1—the first career multi-home run game for both—the Astros defeated the Arizona Diamondbacks, 9–2. Conger's home run in fourth inning off Jeremy Hellickson (7–7) was also his first career grand slam, and first of the season for the Astros, the major league leader with 147 home runs. Dallas Keuchel yielded two runs on two hits over six innings and tallied 8 strikeouts to move to 13–5. It was Keuchel's 33rd consecutive games going at least 6 innings, which set a franchise record.

Adrián Beltré made history against the Astros on August 3, and McCullers endured the shortest outing of his career as the Rangers won out in a slugfest, 12–9. Beltré hit for the cycle for the third time his career, first to do so since Babe Herman in 1933. McCullers (5-4), the youngest starting pitcher in the majors at 21, induced just one out while surrendering six runs on seven hits. Castro hit a grand slam for Houston, the second in three days for the club, as well as his third homer in 14 at-bats. Correa hit a two-run home run in the first to put the Astros ahead, and Luis Valbuena also hit a solo home run in the second inning, his 20th of the season, and first over 83 at-bats since June 23.

During his first 50 games, Correa hit 13 home runs, the most by a shortstop in major league history, (Note: Surpassed Nomar Garciaparra, who hit nine of over his first 50 games in 1996 for the Red Sox.) and were the fifth-most among active players. (Note: Trailing only José Abreu (17), Albert Pujols (16), Ryan Braun (15), and Gattis (14).) Correa also produced six games with at least three hits and a home run, just the second player with at least as many over the prior 100 years. (Note: Former Astro Hunter Pence had the most since 1914, posting seven such games as a rookie in 2007.)

On August 18, Marwin González belted his first career walk-off home run to punctuate a 3–2 win while making his first start of the year in left field. He went 3-for-4, adding a double and two RBI versus the Tampa Bay Rays before his leadoff blast in the bottom of the 10th inning off All-Star closer Brad Boxberger.

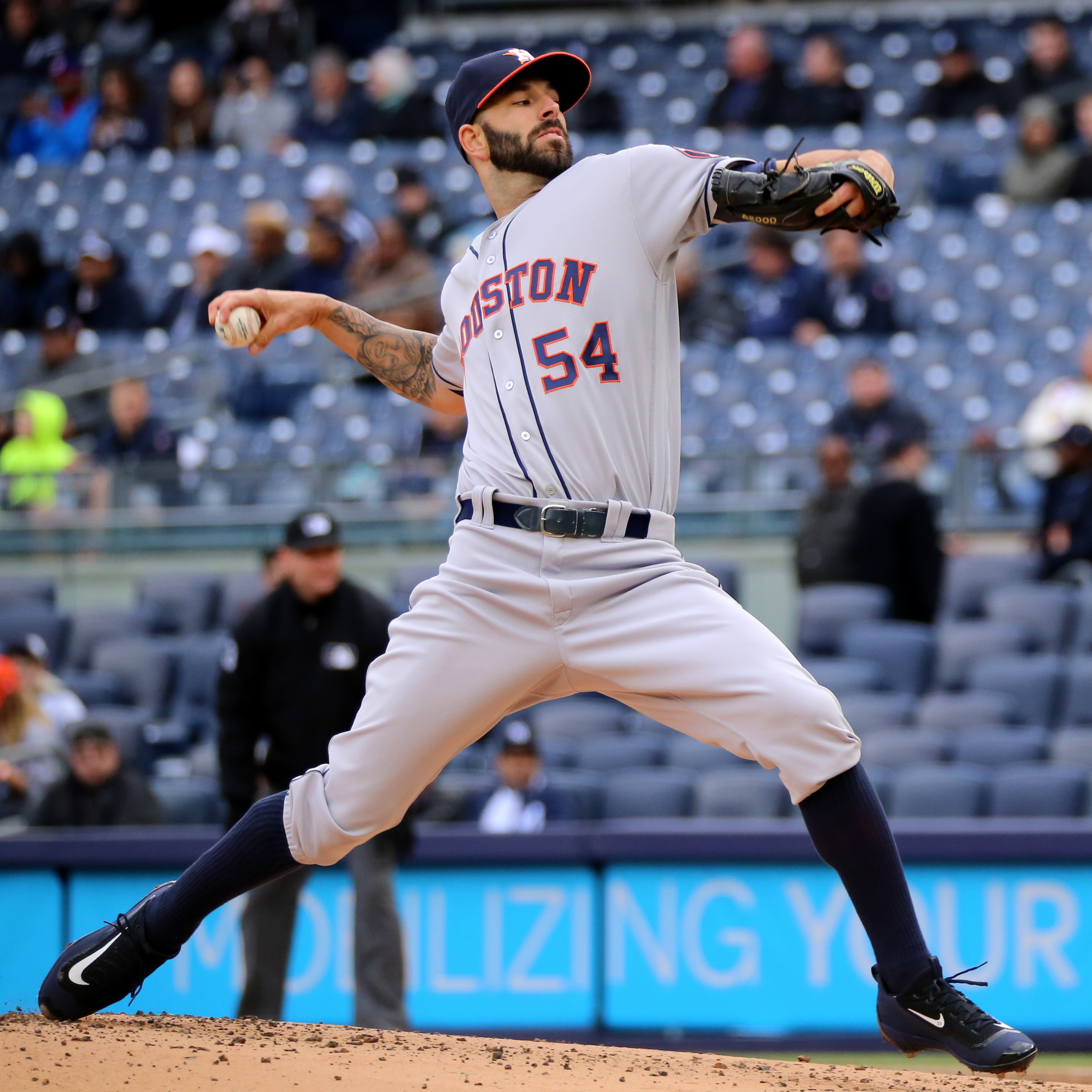
After 1,011 regular-season games, Mike Fiers pitched the first-ever no-hitter at Minute Maid Park, opened for play in 2000.

Mike Fiers, making his third start for the Astros, pitched a no-hitter versus the Los Angeles Dodgers to lead a 3–0 win on August 21. The first complete game of his career, Fiers (6–9) threw 134 pitches, and struck out Justin Turner for the game's final at bat. It was the first-ever no-hitter accomplished at Minute Maid Park, the first complete-game no-hitter for the Astros since Darryl Kile on September 8, 1993 versus the Mets, and first overall for Houston since a combined six-pitcher effort on June 11, 2003, against the Yankees. On August 23, Castro hit a walk-off home run in the 10th inning to complete a three-game sweep of the NL West division-leading Dodgers. In the ninth, Correa hit a leadoff single off Kenley Jansen, vying for an 18th consecutive converted save. Marwin González hit an RBI single that scored the tying run. It was the Astros' fourth last at-bat win over their prior eight game.

Following his no-hit performance, Fiers was named AL Player of the Week. In fact, per the Elias Sports Bureau (ESB), Fiers' sterling outing made him the first since the Texas Rangers' Jim Bibby in 1973 to have changed teams mid-season and author a no-hitter.

On August 25, the Astros won a tense contest at Yankee Stadium, 15–1, led by Keuchel's seven shutout innings and Gattis' and Gómez' one-home run, four-RBI performances apiece. However, after flying out the in sixth inning, Gómez yelled toward the Yankees dugout. Keuchel, meanwhile, became the AL's first 15-game winner.

Keuchel, who was announced as AL Pitcher of the Month for August, became the first Astro to win more than two during a single season. He won four of six starts while turning in a 1.94 ERA, fifth best in the AL. Meanwhile, rotation mates Collin McHugh (1.89) and Scott Feldman (1.33) both produced superior ERAs, highlighting a superlative month for Houston pitching. Moreover, as this was the fourth Pitcher of the Month individually won by an Astro, this team equaled the 1979 pitching staff as the only Astros staffs to be so recognized as many as four times during the same season.

==== September—October ====
Hank Conger hit his second grand slam of the season on September 4, while Collin McHugh delivered 7 2/3 innings with seven hits allowed and six strikeouts as the Astros defeated the Minnesota Twins, 8–0. Conger's slam was his tenth home run of the season, giving the Astros with ten players with at least as many. This broke the franchise record of 9 set in 2000, and was one short of the major league record set by the 2004 Detroit Tigers.

On September 11, Altuve doubled off Jered Weaver at Angel Stadium to procure his 800th career hit. Playing in his 647th career game, Altuve overtook César Cedeño for fastest in club history to the milestone, who did so in 707 games. Down to his final strike in the ninth and 3–0 deficit to the Angels on September 13, Preston Tucker hit a solo home run. Springer tripled just beyond a diving right fielder Kole Calhoun and scored on Altuve's bloop single. Correa then reached as his ground ball stuck inside of Taylor Featherston's glove, setting up pinch hitter Jed Lowrie for a three-run home that also eluded Calhoun's reach and landed into the right-field seats. Lowrie's home run capped the Astros' five-run 9th inning rally off AL saves leader Huston Street (3–3) for a 5–3 victory, evading a four-game losing streak while also battling the Angels for a wild-card berth.

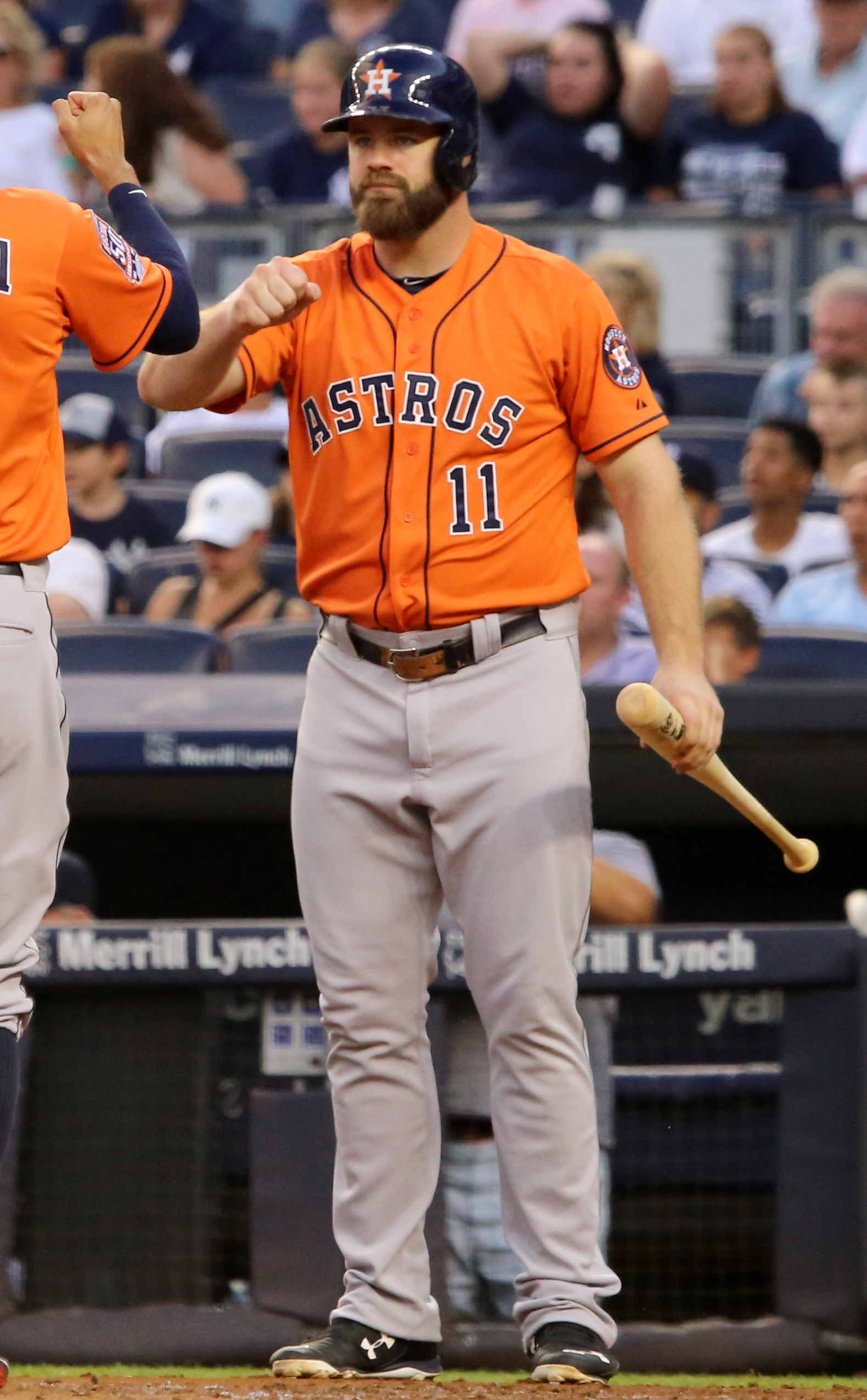
Evan Gattis celebrates with a teammate during a game against the New York Yankees.

The Astros, having led the AL West since July 28, lost to the Rangers in a walk-off on September 15, who overtook the Astros for sole possession of first place for the first time all season. The Astros lost in the eighth inning or later to Texas for the second consecutive night, and dropped their fifth straight overall to the Rangers, resulting in a road record of 29–44.

Keuchel tossed seven strong innings on September 27 to lead a 4–2 over Texas and improved to 19–8, including to 15–0 at home. He struck out 10, allowed two hits and one run. One strikeout set the club record for strikeouts for a left-hander when he fanned Mike Napoli in the first inning and ended the game with 213. Mike Cuellar had 203 for Houston in 1967. Chris Carter homered off Ross Ohlendorf to up the score 3–1. Pinch runner Carlos Gómez stole second base and scored on a passed ball in the eighth to up Houston's advantage to 4–2.

With a 15–0 W–L record and 1.46 ERA at Minute Maid Park, Keuchel established the major league record for most wins at home while remaining undefeated there in one season. Prior to Keuchel, rotation mates Dave Ferriss and Tex Hughson jointly held the record while with the 1946 Red Sox, each going 13–0 at Fenway Park. Keuchel's ERA was also the lowest home ERA by an AL pitcher since Nolan Ryan surrendered just a 1.07 figure for the 1972 Angels.

Sitting three wins away in the final three games to guarantee a postseason berth, the Astros faced the Seattle Mariners on September 30. A day after being passed for the final wild card slot, the Astros regained control with a 7–6 win. Seattle was ahead 6–3 in the bottom of the sixth inning when Carter hit a game-tying three-run home run, his 24th. Colby Rasmus in an RBI blooper single over the drawn-in infield off Danny Farquhar (1–7) in the seventh for the go-ahead run.

On October 1, Evan Gattis delivered his 11th triple of the season. He was the first major leaguer to log at least 10 triples without a stolen base in one season since Yankees infielder Jerry Lumpe in 1962. The Astros' leader in this category in 2015, Gattis, in this third season, had hit 1 over his first two major league seasons.

On a record-setting night at Chase Field on October 2, Correa hit his 22nd home run of the season to surpass Lance Berkman's record of 21 for an Astros rookie, which he hit in 2000. (Note: Correa's record was broken by Yordan Alvarez in 2019 when he hit 27.) The Astros also set a team scoring record, running away to a 21–5 score. Correa total four runs scored, stole a base, and hit his first triple. George Springer, Rasmus, and Luis Valbuena all added home runs for Houston. Duffy's single in the eighth to score Springer and Villar drove home the record-setting run. Keuchel reached 20 wins, becoming the first Astro to reach the plateau since Roy Oswalt (20–12) in 2005. Leading a 6–2 win over the Arizona Diamondbacks on October 4, Collin McHugh was the winning pitcher (19–7), just one behind Keuchel, who led the AL. They became the first Astros duo to win at least 19 apiece since Mike Hampton (22–4) and José Lima (21–10) did so in 1999.

Altuve doubled versus the Diamondbacks on the final day of the season to reach the 200-hit milestone, one season after setting the club record for hits (225), and becoming the first player in club history to record multiple 200-hit seasons. The Astros' regular season ended with a 5–3 loss to Arizona; however, they qualified for the playoffs for the first time since 2005 with an 86–76 record, securing a trip to Yankee Stadium to face New York in the AL Wild Card Game.

==== Performance overview ====
The Astros concluded the season at 86–76, runners-up in the AL West division, and two games behind the division-champion Texas Rangers. Along with the New York Yankees, the Astros became Wild Card qualifiers for the playoffs. This was the Astros' third Wild Card qualification and tenth playoff entrance all-time. Houston improved by 16 victories from the prior season and by 35 over the previous two, while ending a string of four consecutive seasons with at least 92 losses, a feat they had last accomplished by losing 96 or more times each during their first four seasons in existence (1962 to 1965). This was the most the games the Astros had won since 2008, also 86, their final winning season as members of the National League (NL). Houston's most recent playoff qualification occurred in 2005, also the year they won their first NL pennant and made their first World Series appearance.

The Astros hit 230 home runs, the third time in club history in which they had hit at least 200 home runs, which was, at the time, the second-greatest amount to the 2000 squad (249). (Note: In 2001, the team hit 208 home runs.) Meanwhile, the Astros pitching staff surrendered just 618 runs, their fewest since 2005 (609), and third-fewest since 1986 (569) in a non-shortened season.

Dallas Keuchel was recognized for both his pitching and defense. He won the AL Cy Young Award, becoming the first Astros left-hander, and third overall, joining Mike Scott in 1986 and Roger Clemens in 2004. Keuchel (2.48) turned in the fourth-lowest ERA in club history among left-handers, trailing only Bob Knepper (2.18 in 1981), Mike Cuellar (2.22 in 1966) and Andy Pettitte (2.39 in 2005). (Note: For single seasons, throws LH, qualified for league ERA title, playing for HOU, in the regular season, sorted by ascending earned run average.) Keuchel also became the club's second left-hander to win 20 games, succeeding Mike Hampton in 1999, and eighth hurler overall, succeeding Roy Oswalt (2004 and 2005). Moreover, for the second consecutive campaign, Keuchel was recognized with both the Fielding Bible and Gold Glove Awards. He became the first Astros player to win more than one Fielding Bible Award, and the first Astros pitcher to recognized with a Gold Glove more than once.

Jose Altuve, having led the league in both hits and stolen bases for a second consecutive campaign, joined Snuffy Stirnweiss (1944 to 1945) as the second major leaguer to do so. Altuve was recognized with both the Silver Slugger and Gold Glove Awards, becoming the third Astros player to win both awards at his respective position during the same campaign, succeeding Craig Biggio (thrice, 1994, 1995, and 1997) and Jeff Bagwell (1994). The first Astro to lead the league in hits more than once, Altuve was preceded by José Cruz (twice), Biggio (seven), and Bagwell (four) as having won the Silver Slugger multiple times as members of the Astros.

=== League standings ===
==== American League West ====
AL West
Team	W	L	Pct.	GB	Home	Road
Texas Rangers	88	74	.543	—	43‍–‍38	45‍–‍36
Houston Astros	86	76	.531	2	53‍–‍28	33‍–‍48
Los Angeles Angels	85	77	.525	3	49‍–‍32	36‍–‍45
Seattle Mariners	76	86	.469	12	36‍–‍45	40‍–‍41
Oakland Athletics	68	94	.420	20	34‍–‍47	34‍–‍47

==== American League Wild Card ====
AL Wild Card standings

Division leaders
Team	W	L	Pct.
Kansas City Royals	95	67	.586
Toronto Blue Jays	93	69	.574
Texas Rangers	88	74	.543

Wild Card teams (Top 2 teams qualify for postseason)
Team	W	L	Pct.	GB
New York Yankees	87	75	.537	+1
Houston Astros	86	76	.531	—
Los Angeles Angels	85	77	.525	1
Minnesota Twins	83	79	.512	3
Cleveland Indians	81	80	.503	4½
Baltimore Orioles	81	81	.500	5
Tampa Bay Rays	80	82	.494	6
Boston Red Sox	78	84	.481	8
Chicago White Sox	76	86	.469	10
Seattle Mariners	76	86	.469	10
Detroit Tigers	74	87	.460	11½
Oakland Athletics	68	94	.420	18

==== Record against opponents ====
American League

2015 American League record Source: MLB Standings Grid – 2015
Team	BAL	BOS	CWS	CLE	DET	HOU	KC	LAA	MIN	NYY	OAK	SEA	TB	TEX	TOR	NL
Baltimore	—	11–8	3–3	5–1	4–3	3–4	3–4	2–4	0–7	10–9	6–1	3–3	10–9	1–6	8–11	12–8
Boston	8–11	—	3–4	2–4	4–2	2–4	4–3	2–5	2–5	8–11	5–1	4–3	9–10	2–5	10–9	13–7
Chicago	3–3	4–3	—	10–9	9–10	5–1	7–12	4–3	6–13	2–5	5–2	4–3	1–5	3–3	4–3	9–11
Cleveland	1–5	4–2	9–10	—	7–11	5–2	9–10	4–2	7–12	5–2	3–4	4–3	5–2	3–3	3–4	12–8
Detroit	3–4	2–4	10–9	11–7	—	3–4	9–10	1–6	11–8	2–5	2–4	4–3	3–3	2–5	2–4	9–11
Houston	4–3	4–2	1–5	2–5	4–3	—	4–2	10–9	3–3	4–3	10–9	12–7	2–5	6–13	4–3	16–4
Kansas City	4–3	3–4	12–7	10–9	10–9	2–4	—	6–1	12–7	2–4	5–1	4–2	6–1	3–4	3–4	13–7
Los Angeles	4–2	5–2	3–4	2–4	6–1	9–10	1–6	—	5–2	2–4	11–8	12–7	3–3	12–7	2–5	8–12
Minnesota	7–0	5–2	13–6	12–7	8–11	3–3	7–12	2–5	—	1–5	4–3	4–3	4–2	3–3	2–5	8–12
New York	9–10	11–8	5–2	2–5	5–2	3–4	4–2	4–2	5–1	—	3–4	5–1	12–7	2–5	6–13	11–9
Oakland	1–6	1–5	2–5	4–3	4–2	9–10	1–5	8–11	3–4	4–3	—	6–13	3–4	10–9	1–5	11–9
Seattle	3–3	3–4	3–4	3–4	3–4	7–12	2–4	7–12	3–4	1–5	13–6	—	4–3	12–7	4–2	8–12
Tampa Bay	9–10	10–9	5–1	2–5	3–3	5–2	1–6	3–3	2–4	7–12	4–3	3–4	—	2–5	10–9	14–6
Texas	6–1	5–2	3–3	3–3	5–2	13–6	4–3	7–12	3–3	5–2	9–10	7–12	5–2	—	2–4	11–9
Toronto	11–8	9–10	3–4	4–3	4–2	3–4	4–3	5–2	5–2	13–6	5–1	2–4	9–10	4–2	—	12–8

=== Game log ===
2015 Game Log
April: 15–7 (Home: 5–5; Away: 10–2)

#	Date	Opponent	Score	Win	Loss	Save	Attendance	Record
1	April 6	Indians	2–0	**Keuchel** (1–0)	Kluber (0–1)	**Gregerson** (1)	43,753	1–0
2	April 8	Indians	0–2	Carrasco (1–0)	**Feldman** (0–1)	Allen (1)	23,078	1–1
3	April 9	Indians	1–5	Bauer (1–0)	**Wojciechowski** (0–1)	—	22,593	1–2
4	April 10	@ Rangers	5–1	**McHugh** (1–0)	Holland (0–1)	—	48,885	2–2
5	April 11	@ Rangers	2–6	Gallardo (1–1)	**Hernández** (0–1)	—	36,833	2–3
6	April 12	@ Rangers	6–4 (14)	**Harris** (1–0)	Verrett (0–1)	**Deduno** (1)	35,276	3–3
7	April 13	Athletics	1–8	Kazmir (2–0)	**Feldman** (0–2)	—	19,279	3–4
8	April 14	Athletics	0–4	Graveman (1–1)	**Peacock** (0–1)	—	18,935	3–5
9	April 15	Athletics	6–1	**McHugh** (2–0)	Pomeranz (1–1)	—	19,777	4–5
10	April 17	Angels	3–6	Ramos (1–0)	**Qualls** (0–1)	Street (4)	22,660	4–6
11	April 18	Angels	4–0	**Keuchel** (2–0)	Wilson (1–2)	—	28,209	5–6
12	April 19	Angels	4–3	**Feldman** (1–2)	Richards (0–1)	**Gregerson** (2)	24,254	6–6
13	April 20	@ Mariners	7–5	**Sipp** (1–0)	Farquhar (0–1)	**Gregerson** (3)	15,129	7–6
14	April 21	@ Mariners	6–3	**McHugh** (3–0)	Furbush (0–1)	**Qualls** (1)	13,949	8–6
15	April 22	@ Mariners	2–3	Happ (1–1)	**Hernández** (0–2)	Rodney (4)	14,756	8–7
16	April 24	@ Athletics	5–4 (11)	**Gregerson** (1–0)	O'Flaherty (0–2)	**Qualls** (2)	18,205	9–7
17	April 25	@ Athletics	9–3	**Feldman** (2–2)	Graveman (1–2)	—	24,342	10–7
18	April 26	@ Athletics	7–6	**Sipp** (2–0)	Clippard (0–2)	**Gregerson** (4)	22,080	11–7
19	April 27	@ Padres	9–4	**Neshek** (1–0)	Benoit (3–1)	—	19,532	12–7
20	April 28	@ Padres	14–3	**Hernández** (1–2)	Ross (1–2)	—	22,796	13–7
21	April 29	@ Padres	7–2	**Keuchel** (3–0)	Cashner (1–4)	—	21,824	14–7
22	April 30	Mariners	3–2 (10)	**Gregerson** (2–0)	Leone (0–2)	—	19,108	15–7

May: 16–13 (Home: 11–7; Away: 5–6)

#	Date	Opponent	Score	Win	Loss	Save	Attendance	Record
23	May 1	Mariners	4–3	**Fields** (1–0)	Elias (0–1)	**Gregerson** (5)	21,834	16–7
24	May 2	Mariners	11–4	**McHugh** (4–0)	Walker (1–3)	—	24,435	17–7
25	May 3	Mariners	7–6	**Neshek** (2–0)	Smith (0–1)	**Gregerson** (6)	25,283	18–7
26	May 4	Rangers	1–2	Kela (2–1)	**Qualls** (0–2)	Feliz (3)	17,597	18–8
27	May 5	Rangers	1–7	Rodríguez (1–1)	**Feldman** (2–3)	—	20,951	18–9
28	May 6	Rangers	3–11	Lewis (2–2)	**Deduno** (0–1)	—	22,230	18–10
29	May 7	@ Angels	3–2	**Neshek** (3–0)	Street (2–1)	**Gregerson** (7)	25,097	19–10
30	May 8	@ Angels	0–2	Weaver (1–4)	**Hernández** (1–3)	—	40,006	19–11
31	May 9	@ Angels	6–5	**Keuchel** (4–0)	Shoemaker (2–3)	**Qualls** (3)	40,210	20–11
32	May 10	@ Angels	1–3	Richards (3–1)	**Feldman** (2–4)	Street (10)	30,929	20–12
33	May 12	Giants	1–8	Heston (3–3)	**McHugh** (4–1)	—	20,468	20–13
34	May 13	Giants	4–3	**Qualls** (1–2)	Affeldt (0–2)	**Gregerson** (8)	20,725	21–13
35	May 14	Blue Jays	6–4	**Fields** (2–0)	Loup (1–2)	**Qualls** (4)	15,777	22–13
36	May 15	Blue Jays	8–4	**Keuchel** (5–0)	Dickey (1–5)	—	21,653	23–13
37	May 16	Blue Jays	6–5	**Feldman** (3–4)	Francis (1–2)	**Gregerson** (9)	27,102	24–13
38	May 17	Blue Jays	4–2	**McHugh** (5–1)	Buehrle (5–3)	**Gregerson** (10)	25,307	25–13
39	May 18	Athletics	1–2	Mujica (2–1)	**Thatcher** (0–1)	Clippard (4)	21,724	25–14
40	May 19	Athletics	6–4	**Hernández** (2–3)	Gray (4–2)	**Neshek** (1)	17,575	26–14
41	May 20	Athletics	6–1	**Keuchel** (6–0)	Hahn (1–4)	—	21,066	27–14
42	May 21	@ Tigers	5–6 (11)	Wilson (1–0)	**Sipp** (2–1)	—	33,193	27–15
43	May 22	@ Tigers	2–6	Simón (5–2)	**McHugh** (5–2)	—	37,276	27–16
44	May 23	@ Tigers	3–2	**McCullers** (1–0)	Lobstein (3–5)	**Gregerson** (11)	40,153	28–16
45	May 24	@ Tigers	10–8	**Thatcher** (1–1)	Wilson (1–1)	**Gregerson** (12)	36,449	29–16
46	May 25	@ Orioles	3–4	Brach (2–0)	**Keuchel** (6–1)	Britton (11)	28,909	29–17
47	May 26	@ Orioles	4–1	**Feldman** (4–4)	Tillman (2–6)	**Gregerson** (13)	21,541	30–17
48	May 27	@ Orioles	4–5	Brach (3–0)	**Sipp** (2–2)	Britton (12)	16,401	30–18
49	May 29	White Sox	3–6 (11)	Jennings (1–1)	**Fields** (2–1)	Robertson (10)	25,957	30–19
50	May 30	White Sox	3–0	**Keuchel** (7–1)	Quintana (2–6)	—	29,720	31–19
51	May 31	White Sox	0–6	Danks (3–4)	**Hernández** (2–4)	—	27,423	31–20

June: 15–14 (Home: 11–4; Away: 4–10)

#	Date	Opponent	Score	Win	Loss	Save	Attendance	Record
52	June 1	Orioles	5–2	**Harris** (2–0)	Brach (3–1)	**Gregerson** (14)	17,259	32–20
53	June 2	Orioles	6–4	**McHugh** (6–2)	Wright (2–1)	**Gregerson** (15)	18,730	33–20
54	June 3	Orioles	3–1	**McCullers** (2–0)	González (5–4)	—	20,305	34–20
55	June 4	Orioles	2–3	O'Day (2–0)	**Qualls** (1–3)	Britton (14)	20,219	34–21
56	June 5	@ Blue Jays	2–6	Sanchez (5–4)	**Hernández** (2–5)	—	22,971	34–22
57	June 6	@ Blue Jays	2–7	Hutchison (5–1)	**Oberholtzer** (0–1)	—	31,809	34–23
58	June 7	@ Blue Jays	6–7	Hendriks (1–0)	**Gregerson** (2–1)	—	35,571	34–24
59	June 8	@ White Sox	1–3	Sale (6–2)	**McCullers** (2–1)	Robertson (11)	17,352	34–25
60	June 9	@ White Sox	2–4	Rodon (2–0)	**Keuchel** (7–2)	Robertson (12)	18,439	34–26
61	June 10	@ White Sox	1–4	Quintana (3–6)	**Sipp** (2–3)	Robertson (13)	17,455	34–27
62	June 12	Mariners	10–0	**Oberholtzer** (1–1)	Hernández (9-3)	—	32,173	35–27
63	June 13	Mariners	1–8	Montgomery (1–1)	**McHugh** (6–3)	—	36,762	35–28
64	June 14	Mariners	13–0	**McCullers** (3–1)	Elias (3–4)	—	29,153	36–28
65	June 15	Rockies	6–3	**Keuchel** (8–2)	Bettis (2–2)	**Gregerson** (16)	21,820	37–28
66	June 16	Rockies	8–5	**Harris** (3–0)	Rusin (2–2)	**Gregerson** (17)	22,245	38–28
67	June 17	@ Rockies	8–4	**Oberholtzer** (2–1)	Kendrick (2–9)	—	33,041	39–28
68	June 18	@ Rockies	8–4	**McHugh** (7–3)	Hale (2–2)	—	30,770	40–28
69	June 19	@ Mariners	2–5	Elias (4–4)	**McCullers** (3–2)	Smith (4)	40,914	40–29
70	June 20	@ Mariners	3–6	Walker (5–6)	**Keuchel** (8–3)	Smith (5)	26,770	40–30
71	June 21	@ Mariners	6–2	**Harris** (4–0)	Happ (3–4)	—	40,905	41–30
72	June 22	@ Angels	3–4	Street (3–2)	**Qualls** (1–4)	—	34,153	41–31
73	June 23	@ Angels	13–3	**McHugh** (8–3)	Wilson (5–6)	—	41,208	42–31
74	June 24	@ Angels	1–2 (13)	Alvarez (2–1)	**Thatcher** (1–2)	—	33,543	42–32
75	June 25	Yankees	4–0	**Keuchel** (9–3)	Warren (5–5)	—	28,643	43–32
76	June 26	Yankees	2–3	Eovaldi (7–2)	**Harris** (4–1)	Betances (5)	37,748	43–33
77	June 27	Yankees	6–9	Shreve (5–1)	**Neshek** (3–1)	Betances (6)	41,133	43–34
78	June 28	Yankees	3–1	**McHugh** (9–3)	Pineda (8–5)	**Gregerson** (18)	31,961	44–34
79	June 29	Royals	6–1	**McCullers** (4–2)	Blanton (2–1)	—	20,419	45–34
80	June 30	Royals	4–0	**Keuchel** (10–3)	Duffy (2–4)	—	24,642	46–34

July: 12–12 (Home: 9–2; Away: 3–10)

#	Date	Opponent	Score	Win	Loss	Save	Attendance	Record
81	July 1	Royals	6–5	**Gregerson** (3–1)	Herrera (1–2)	—	25,848	47–34
82	July 3	@ Red Sox	12–8 (10)	**Hernández** (3–5)	Ramirez (0–1)	—	37,837	48–34
83	July 4	@ Red Sox	1–6	Buchholz (7–6)	**McHugh** (9–4)	—	36,703	48–35
84	July 5	@ Red Sox	4–5	Barnes (3–2)	**Sipp** (2–4)	Uehara (19)	36,481	48–36
85	July 6	@ Indians	9–4	**Keuchel** (11–3)	Carrasco (10–7)	—		49-36
86	July 7	@ Indians	0–2	Kluber (4–9)	**Velasquez** (0–1)	Shaw (2)	10,821	49-37
87	July 8	@ Indians	2–4	Bauer (8–5)	**Thatcher** (1–3)	Allen (17)	15,255	49–38
88	July 9	@ Indians	1–3	Anderson (2–1)	**Oberholtzer** (2–2)	Allen (18)	11,496	49–39
89	July 10	@ Rays	1–3	Ramírez (8–3)	**McHugh** (9–5)	Boxberger (21)	17,129	49–40
90	July 11	@ Rays	0–3	Odorizzi (5–5)	**Keuchel** (11–4)	Boxberger (22)	18,429	49–41
91	July 12	@ Rays	3–4	Moore (1–0)	**McCullers** (4–3)	Boxberger (23)	16,458	49–42
–	July 14	86th All-Star Game	AL 6–3 NL	Price (1–0)	Kershaw (0–1)	—	43,656	49–42
92	July 17	Rangers	3–2	**McHugh** (10–5)	Pérez (0–1)	**Gregerson** (19)	36,904	50–42
93	July 18	Rangers	6–7	Lewis (9–4)	**Feldman** (4–5)	Tolleson (14)	41,941	50–43
94	July 19	Rangers	10–0	**Keuchel** (12–4)	Gallardo (7–9)	—	36,532	51–43
95	July 21	Red Sox	8–3	**Velasquez** (1–1)	Johnson (0–1)	—	26,913	52–43
96	July 22	Red Sox	4 –2	**McHugh** (11–5)	Kelly (2–6)	**Gregerson** (20)	31,104	53–43
97	July 23	Red Sox	5–4	**Fields** (3–1)	Breslow (0–1)	—	30,748	54–43
98	July 24	@ Royals	4–0	**Kazmir** (6–5)	Guthrie (7–6)	**Gregerson** (21)	36,965	55–43
99	July 25	@ Royals	1–2 (10)	Herrera (2–2)	**Harris** (4–2)	—	38,393	55–44
100	July 26	@ Royals	1–5	Ventura (5–7)	**Keuchel** (12–5)	—	33,638	55–45
101	July 28	Angels	10–5	**McHugh** (12–5)	Wilson (8–8)	—	24,031	56–45
102	July 29	Angels	6–3	**McCullers** (5–3)	Richards (10–8)	—	31,272	57–45
103	July 30	Angels	3–0	**Gregerson** (4–1)	Álvarez (2–2)	—	27,598	58–45
104	July 31	Diamondbacks	4–6	Hudson (3–3)	**Neshek** (3–2)	Ziegler (18)	34,720	58–46

August: 15–13 (Home: 10–3; Away: 5–10)

#	Date	Opponent	Score	Win	Loss	Save	Attendance	Record
105	August 1	Diamondbacks	9–2	**Keuchel** (13–5)	Hellickson (7–7)	—	36,602	59–46
106	August 2	Diamondbacks	4–1	**McHugh** (13–5)	Ray (3–6)	**Gregerson** (22)	33,871	60–46
107	August 3	@ Rangers	9–12	Lewis (12–4)	**McCullers** (5–4)	Tolleson (19)	21,671	60–47
108	August 4	@ Rangers	3–4	Gallardo (8–9)	**Straily** (0–1)	Tolleson (20)	29,953	60–48
109	August 5	@ Rangers	3–4	Martinez (7–6)	**Kazmir** (6–6)	Dyson (2)	31,782	60–49
110	August 6	@ Athletics	5–4 (10)	**Gregerson** (5–1)	Mujica (2–4)	**Harris** (1)	16,172	61–49
111	August 7	@ Athletics	1–3	Gray (12–4)	**Keuchel** (13–6)	—	18,908	61–50
112	August 8	@ Athletics	1–2	Chavez (6–11)	**McHugh** (13–6)	Mujica (1)	25,091	61–51
113	August 9	@ Athletics	4–5	Abad (1–2)	**Gregerson** (5–2)	—	20,278	61–52
114	August 11	@ Giants	1–3	Bumgarner (13–6)	**Kazmir** (6–7)	—	42,569	61–53
115	August 12	@ Giants	2–0	**Feldman** (5–5)	Heston (11–7)	**Gregerson** (23)	41,967	62–53
116	August 14	Tigers	5–1	**Keuchel** (14–6)	Simón (10–7)	—	33,212	63–53
117	August 15	Tigers	2–4 (11)	Alburquerque (2–0)	**Neshek** (3–3)	Feliz (7)	29,482	63–54
118	August 16	Tigers	6–5	**Harris** (5–2)	Gorzelanny (1–2)	—	29,969	64–54
119	August 17	Rays	2–9	Ramírez (10–4)	**Kazmir** (6–8)	—	16,256	64–55
120	August 18	Rays	3–2 (10)	**Gregerson** (6–2)	Boxberger (4–9)	—	17,749	65–55
121	August 19	Rays	3–2 (13)	**Fields** (4–1)	Andriese (3–3)	—	26,001	66–55
122	August 20	Rays	0–1	Archer (11–9)	**McHugh** (13–7)	—	18,177	66–56
123	August 21	Dodgers	3–0	**Fiers** (6–9)	Anderson (7–9)	—	33,833	67–56
124	August 22	Dodgers	3–1	**Kazmir** (7–8)	Greinke (13–3)	**Gregerson** (24)	39,999	68–56
125	August 23	Dodgers	3–2 (10)	**Gregerson** (7–2)	Hatcher (1–5)	—	28,665	69–56
126	August 24	@ Yankees	0–1	Miller (2–2)	**Pérez** (2–2)	—	37,125	69–57
127	August 25	@ Yankees	15–1	**Keuchel** (15–6)	Nova (5–6)	—	38,015	70–57
128	August 26	@ Yankees	6–2	**McHugh** (14–7)	Pineda (9–8)	—	37,259	71–57
129	August 28	@ Twins	0–3	Gibson (9–9)	**Kazmir** (7–9)	Jepsen (9)	28,636	71–58
130	August 29	@ Twins	4–1	**Fiers** (7–9)	Pelfrey (6–8)	**Gregerson** (25)	38,876	72–58
131	August 30	@ Twins	5–7	Santana (3-4)	**McCullers** (5–5)	—	28,877	72–59
132	August 31	Mariners	8–3	**Keuchel** (16–6)	Nuño (0–3)	—	19,923	73–59

September: 11–16 (Home: 7–7; Away: 4–9)

#	Date	Opponent	Score	Win	Loss	Save	Attendance	Record
133	September 1	Mariners	5–7	Kensing (1–0)	**Neshek** (3–4)	Wilhelmsen (7)	18,157	73–60
134	September 2	Mariners	3–8	Smith (2–5)	**Neshek** (3–5)	Wilhelmsen (8)	18,669	73–61
135	September 4	Twins	8–0	**McHugh** (15–7)	Pelfrey (6–9)	—	27,807	74–61
136	September 5	Twins	2–3	Santana (4–4)	**Gregerson** (7–3)	Jepsen (11)	27,643	74–62
137	September 6	Twins	8–5	**Keuchel** (17–6)	May (8–9)	**Gregerson** (26)	37,648	75–62
138	September 7	@ Athletics	9–10	Doubront (3–1)	**Fiers** (7–10)	Doolittle (1)	22,214	75–63
139	September 8	@ Athletics	0–4	Gray (13–7)	**Kazmir** (7–10)	—	11,364	75–64
140	September 9	@ Athletics	11–5	**McHugh** (16–7)	Brooks (1–3)	—	13,387	76–64
141	September 11	@ Angels	2–3	Weaver (7–10)	**Keuchel** (17–7)	Street (34)	39,636	76–65
142	September 12	@ Angels	2–3	Smith (5–5)	**Harris** (5–3)	Street (35)	41,130	76–66
143	September 13	@ Angels	5–3	**Qualls** (2–4)	Street (3–3)	**Gregerson** (27)	41,550	77–66
144	September 14	@ Rangers	3–5	Kela (7–5)	**Harris** (5–4)	Tolleson (32)	27,772	77–67
145	September 15	@ Rangers	5–6	Tolleson (6–3)	**Pérez** (2–3)	—	26,942	77–68
146	September 16	@ Rangers	3–14	Pérez (3–4)	**Keuchel** (17–8)	—	34,483	77–69
147	September 17	@ Rangers	2–8	Lewis (16–8)	**McCullers** (5–6)	—	31,122	77–70
148	September 18	Athletics	3–4	Pomeranz (5–5)	**Neshek** (3–6)	Dull (1)	27,567	77–71
149	September 19	Athletics	10–6	**Qualls** (3–4)	Rodriguez (4–2)	—	27,044	78–71
150	September 20	Athletics	5–1	**McHugh** (17–7)	Brooks (2–4)	—	22,453	79–71
151	September 21	Angels	6–3	**Keuchel** (18–8)	Weaver (7–12)	**Gregerson** (28)	25,318	80–71
152	September 22	Angels	3–4	Santiago (9–9)	**McCullers** (5–7)	Street (39)	25,671	80–72
153	September 23	Angels	5–6	Gott (3–2)	**Harris** (5–5)	Street (40)	25,573	80–73
154	September 25	Rangers	2–6	Ohlendorf (3–0)	**Kazmir** (7–11)	—	35,180	80–74
155	September 26	Rangers	9–7	**McHugh** (18–7)	Gonzalez (4–6)	**Harris** (2)	35,736	81–74
156	September 27	Rangers	4–2	**Keuchel** (19–8)	Pérez (3–6)	**Gregerson** (29)	36,084	82–74
157	September 28	@ Mariners	3–2	**McCullers** (6–7)	Farquhar (1–6)	**Gregerson** (30)	13,935	83–74
158	September 29	@ Mariners	4–6	Wilhelmsen (2–2)	**Pérez** (2–4)	—	15,331	83–75
159	September 30	@ Mariners	7–6	**Sipp** (3–4)	Farquhar (1–7)	**Gregerson** (31)	14,257	84–75

October: 2–1 (Home: 0–0; Away: 2–1)

#	Date	Opponent	Score	Win	Loss	Save	Attendance	Record
160	October 2	@ Diamondbacks	21–5	**Keuchel** (20–8)	De La Rosa (14–9)	—	33,218	85–75
161	October 3	@ Diamondbacks	6–2	**McHugh** (19–7)	Hellickson (9–12)	—	37,687	86–75
162	October 4	@ Diamondbacks	3–5	Hudson (4–3)	**Qualls** (3–5)	Ziegler (30)	24,788	86–76

Legend: = Win = Loss = Postponement
Bold = Astros team member

== Postseason ==
=== Game log ===
2015 Postseason Game Log (3–3)
AL Wild Card Game (1–0)

#	Date	Opponent	Score	Win	Loss	Save	Attendance	Record
1	October 6	@ Yankees	3–0	Keuchel (1–0)	Tanaka (0–1)	Gregerson (1)	50,113	1–0

AL Division Series (2–3)

#	Date	Opponent	Score	Win	Loss	Save	Attendance	Series
1	October 8	@ Royals	5–2	McHugh (1–0)	Ventura (0–1)	Gregerson (1)	40,146	1–0
2	October 9	@ Royals	4–5	Herrera (1–0)	Harris (0–1)	Davis (1)	40,008	1–1
3	October 11	Royals	4–2	Keuchel (1–0)	Vólquez (0–1)	Gregerson (2)	42,674	2–1
4	October 12	Royals	6–9	Madson (1–0)	Sipp (0–1)	Davis (2)	42,387	2–2
5	October 14	@ Royals	2–7	Cueto (1–0)	McHugh (1–1)	–	40,566	2–3

=== Rosters ===
Playoff rosters
American League Wild Card Game

- Pitchers: 29 Tony Sipp 35 Josh Fields 36 Will Harris 37 Pat Neshek 38 Óliver Pérez 44 Luke Gregerson 50 Chad Qualls 54 Mike Fiers 60 Dallas Keuchel
- Catchers: 15 Jason Castro 16 Hank Conger
- Infielders: 1 Carlos Correa 2 Jonathan Villar 8 Jed Lowrie 9 Marwin González 18 Luis Valbuena 23 Chris Carter 27 Jose Altuve 63 Matt Duffy
- Outfielders: 4 George Springer 6 Jake Marisnick 20 Preston Tucker 28 Colby Rasmus 30 Carlos Gómez
- Designated hitters: 11 Evan Gattis

American League Division Series

- Pitchers: 26 Scott Kazmir 29 Tony Sipp 31 Collin McHugh 35 Josh Fields 36 Will Harris 37 Pat Neshek 38 Óliver Pérez 43 Lance McCullers Jr. 44 Luke Gregerson 54 Mike Fiers 60 Dallas Keuchel
- Catchers: 15 Jason Castro 16 Hank Conger
- Infielders: 1 Carlos Correa 8 Jed Lowrie 9 Marwin González 18 Luis Valbuena 23 Chris Carter 27 Jose Altuve
- Outfielders: 4 George Springer 6 Jake Marisnick 20 Preston Tucker 28 Colby Rasmus 30 Carlos Gómez
- Designated hitters: 11 Evan Gattis

=== American League Wild Card (ALWC) Game ===
Tuesday, October 6, 2015 8:10 pm (EDT) at Yankee Stadium in Bronx, New York
Team	1	2	3	4	5	6	7	8	9	R	H	E
Houston	0	1	0	1	0	0	1	0	0	3	5	0
New York	0	0	0	0	0	0	0	0	0	0	3	0
WP: Dallas Keuchel (1–0) LP: Masahiro Tanaka (0–1) Sv: Luke Gregerson (1); Home runs: HOU: Colby Rasmus (1), Carlos Gómez (1); NYY: None; Attendance: 50,113; Boxscore

Keuchel, who had never had pitched on three days' rest prior to the Wild Card Game, stifled the Yankees with three hits allowed over six innings to lead a 3–0 Astros win. This performance followed another 16 scoreless frames against during the regular season. Colby Rasmus (2nd inning) and Carlos Gómez (4th) both hit leadoff homers for Houston. In the seventh inning, Jonathan Villar pinch-ran for Chris Carter, stole second base, and scored on a single by Jose Altuve for the final run of the contest. Tony Sipp, Will Harris, and Luke Gregerson picked up one scoreless inning apiece, with Gregerson registering the save. The Astros advanced to the American League Division Series to meet the Kansas City Royals.

=== American League Division Series (ALDS) ===
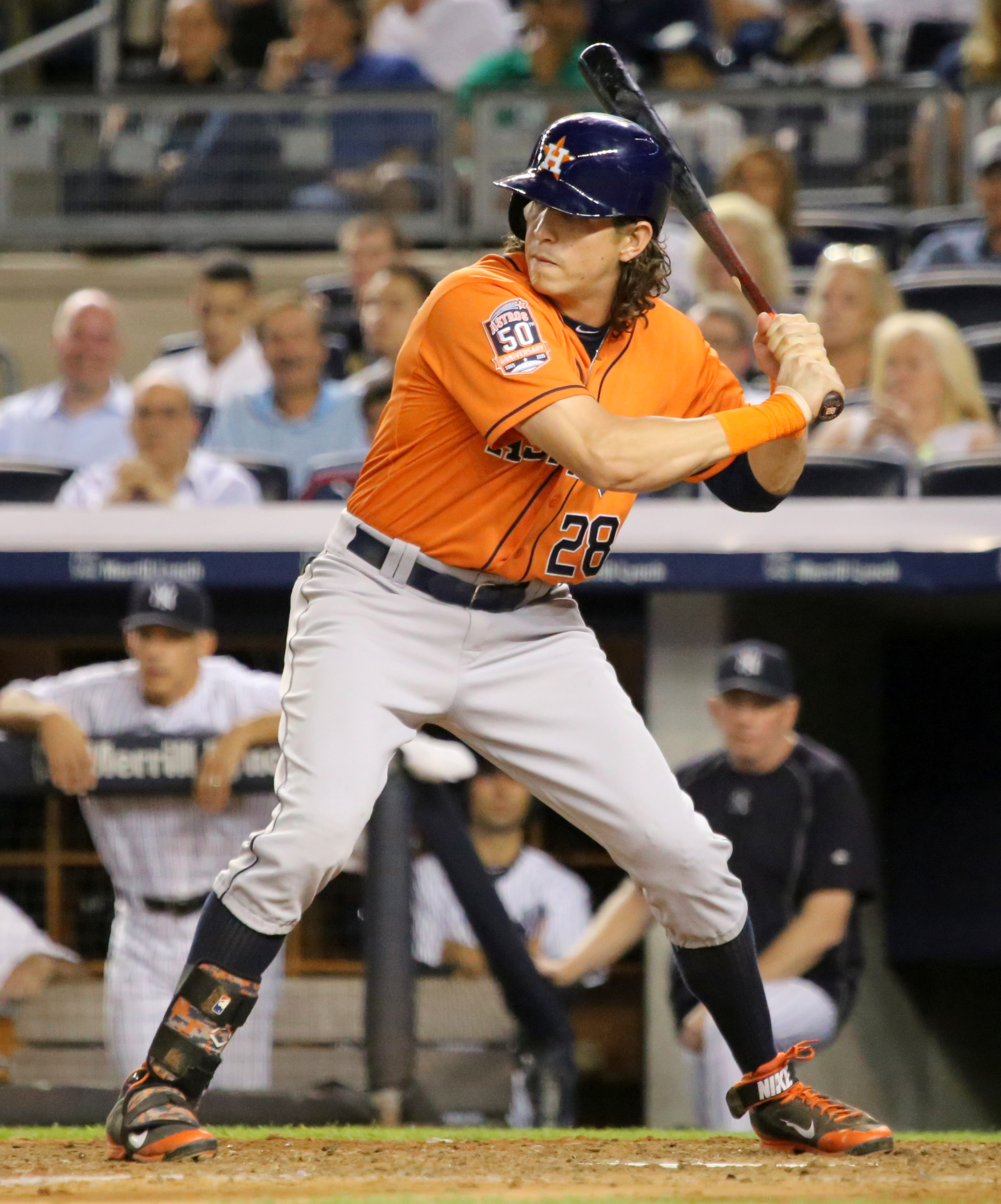
Colby Rasums led the Astros in key offensive categories during the 2015 playoffs.

Game 1

October 8, 2015 6:37 p.m. (CDT) at Kauffman Stadium in Kansas City, Missouri 82 °F (28 °C), partly cloudy w/ passing shower
Team	1	2	3	4	5	6	7	8	9	R	H	E
Houston	2	1	0	0	1	0	0	1	0	5	11	0
Kansas City	0	1	0	1	0	0	0	0	0	2	6	0
WP: Collin McHugh (1–0) LP: Yordano Ventura (0–1) Sv: Luke Gregerson (1); Home runs: HOU: Colby Rasmus (1), George Springer (1); KC: Kendrys Morales 2 (2); Attendance: 40,146; Boxscore

In the top of the first inning, Houston took a 2–0 lead via RBI groundouts from Colby Rasmus and Evan Gattis. In the second inning, Jose Altuve's RBI single added to the Astros lead for a 3–0 score. Kendrys Morales homered off Astros starter Collin McHugh in the bottom half of the second for Kansas City's first run of the game. George Springer (5th inning) and Rasmus (8th) each homered while the offense struck out 14 times. Behind McHugh, the Astros took Game 1 of the ALDS, 5–2.

Game 2

October 9, 2015 2:45 p.m. (CDT) at Kauffman Stadium in Kansas City, Missouri 57 °F (14 °C), cloudy
Team	1	2	3	4	5	6	7	8	9	R	H	E
Houston	1	2	1	0	0	0	0	0	0	4	8	0
Kansas City	0	1	1	0	0	2	1	0	x	5	9	0
WP: Kelvin Herrera (1–0) LP: Will Harris (0–1) Sv: Wade Davis (1); Home runs: HOU: Colby Rasmus (2); KC: Salvador Pérez (1); Attendance: 40,008; Boxscore

The first two innings of Game 2 commenced in a similar fashion to Game 1 with the Astros taking a 3–0 lead and the Royals answering with a home run in the bottom of the second inning. Rasmus hit an RBI double in the first inning, and Springer added a run-run single in the second inning. Salvador Pérez answered with a home run in the bottom of the second to make the score 3–1. Rasmus hit another home run in the top of the third inning, and the Royals answered with a run when Alex Ríos scored on a double play that Ben Zobrist hit into. In the bottom of the sixth, Josh Fields issued a game-tying, bases-loaded walk to Pérez. Fields struck out the next two batters to end the inning and limit the Royals' scoring. In the bottom of the seventh inning, Will Harris (0–1) relieved Fields, and was greeted with a triple by Alcides Escobar. Zobrist then singled Escobar home, accounted for the game-winning RBI and 5–4 victory for Kansas City.

Game 3

October 11, 2015 3:10 p.m. (CDT) at Minute Maid Park in Houston, Texas 73 °F (23 °C), roof closed
Team	1	2	3	4	5	6	7	8	9	R	H	E
Kansas City	0	0	0	1	0	0	0	0	1	2	5	0
Houston	0	0	0	0	2	1	1	0	x	4	8	1
WP: Dallas Keuchel (1–0) LP: Edinson Vólquez (0–1) Sv: Luke Gregerson (2); Home runs: KC: Lorenzo Cain (1), Alex Gordon (1); HOU: Chris Carter (1); Attendance: 42,674

In Game 3, Chris Carter homered and Dallas Keuchel worked through seven challenging innings to lead a 4–2 win for the Astros and take a 2–1 ALDS lead. Keuchel allowed one run on five hits while squelching multiple Royals scoring threats to remain undefeated at home for the season with a 1.45 ERA. Jason Castro hit a two-RBI single in the fifth while Carter was triple short of hitting for the cycle. In the top of the ninth, Luke Gregerson surrendered a leadoff home run to Alex Gordon before finishing off the save opportunity to secure the Astros' first playoff home win since 2005.

== Roster ==
2015 Houston Astros
Roster
Pitchers: 58 Jake Buchanan; 66 Kevin Chapman; 45 Samuel Deduno; 46 Scott Feldman; 68 Michael Feliz; 35 Josh Fields; 54 Mike Fiers; 44 Luke Gregerson; 36 Will Harris; 56 Roberto Hernández; 26 Scott Kazmir; 60 Dallas Keuchel; 43 Lance McCullers Jr.; 31 Collin McHugh; 37 Pat Neshek; 39 Brett Oberholtzer; 41 Brad Peacock; 38 Óliver Pérez; 50 Chad Qualls; 29 Tony Sipp; 47 Dan Straily; 54,56 Joe Thatcher; 67 Vincent Velasquez; 59 Asher Wojciechowski	Catchers: 15 Jason Castro; 16 Hank Conger; 12 Max Stassi; Infielders: 27 Jose Altuve; 23 Chris Carter; 1 Carlos Correa; 63 Matt Duffy; 9 Marwin González; 8 Jed Lowrie; 21 Jon Singleton; 18 Luis Valbuena; 2 Jonathan Villar	Outfielders: 11 Evan Gattis; 30 Carlos Gómez; 19 Robbie Grossman; 0 L. J. Hoes; 6 Jake Marisnick; 3 Alex Presley; 28 Colby Rasmus; 13 Domingo Santana; 4 George Springer; 20 Preston Tucker	Manager: 14 A. J. Hinch; Coaches: 52 Craig Bjornson (bullpen); 85 Javier Bracamonte (bullpen catcher); 48 Rich Dauer (first base); 22 Trey Hillman (bench); 51 Dave Hudgens (hitting); 96 Carlos Muñoz bullpen catcher; 10 Gary Pettis (third base); 53 Brent Strom (pitching); 55 Alan Zinter (assistant hitting)

== Major League Baseball draft ==
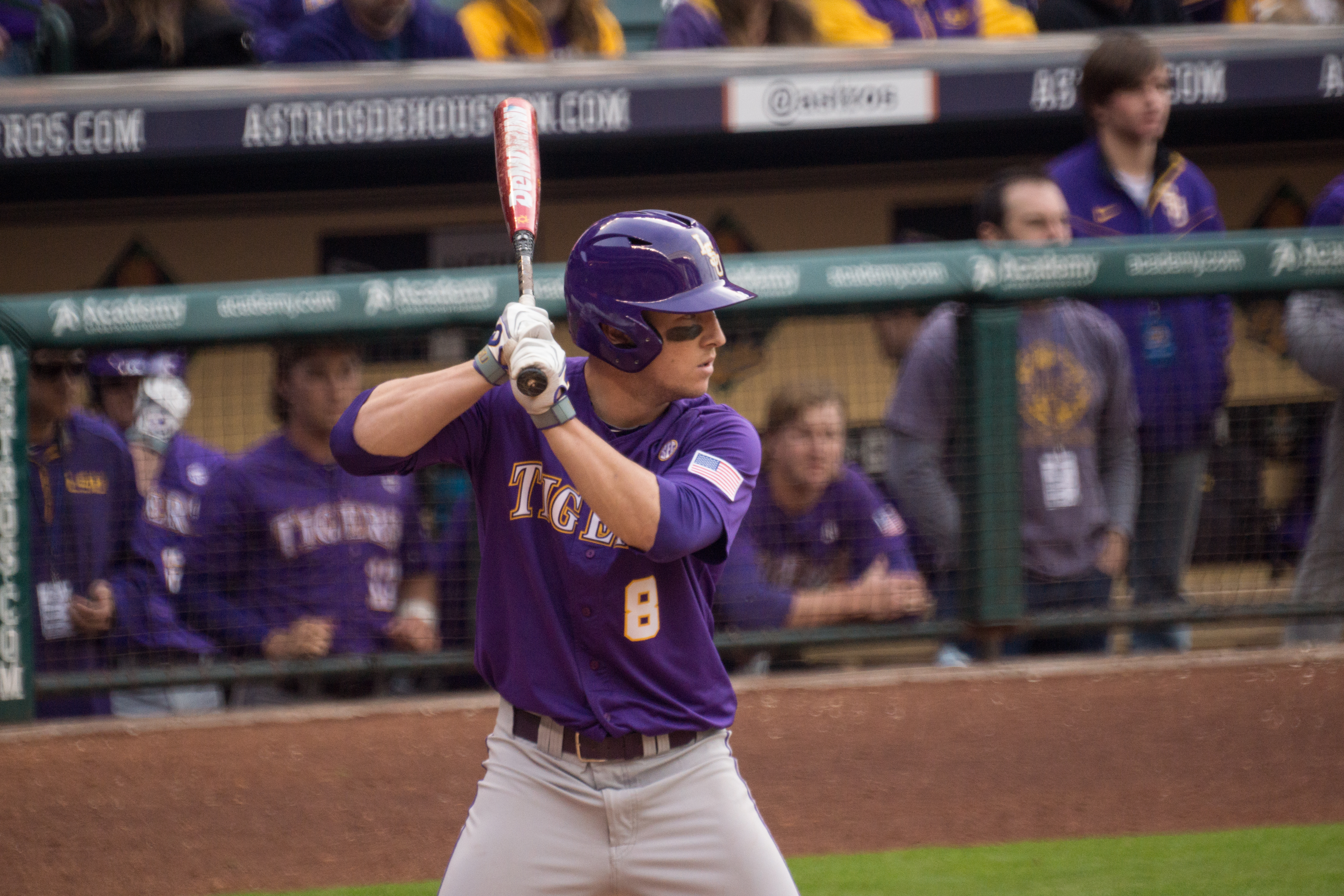
Alex Bregman batting for LSU at Minute Maid Park in 2015

Houston Astros 2015 MLB draft selections
Rd.	Slot	Player	Pos.	School	Origin	Signed
1	2	Alex Bregman (Note: Compensation pick for not signing Brady Aiken in the 2014 draft.)	SS	Louisiana State • 2015	(New Mexico)	Y
1	5	Kyle Tucker	OF	H. B. Plant High School	(Florida)	Y
1	37	Daz Cameron (Note: Pick received from the Miami Marlins along with Marisnick, Francis Martes, and Colin Moran in trade for Jarred Cosart, Enrique Hernández, and Austin Wates.)	OF	Eagle's Landing Christian Academy	(Georgia (U.S. state))	Y
2	46	Thomas Eshelman	RHP	Cal State Fullerton	(California)	Y
3	79	Riley Ferrell	RHP	Texas Christian	(Texas)	Y
4	109	Anthony Hermelyn	C	Oklahoma	(Texas)	Y
5	139	Trent Thornton	RHP	North Carolina	(Pennsylvania)	Y
6	169	Nestor Muriel	CF	Carlos Beltrán Baseball Academy	(Puerto Rico)	Y
7	199	Michael Freeman	LHP	Oklahoma State	(Oklahoma)	Y
8	229	Garrett Stubbs	C	Southern California	(California)	Y
9	259	Zac Person	LHP	Louisiana State • 2015	(Louisiana)	Y
10	289	Scott Weathersby	RHP	Mississippi	(Mississippi)	Y
11	319	Patrick Sandoval	LHP	Mission Viejo High School	(California)	Y
12	349	Myles Straw	CF	St. Johns River State	(California)	Y
22	649	Cole Sands	RHP	North Florida Christian School	(Florida)	N (Note: Signed with the Minnesota Twins from the 2018 draft.)
26	769	Ralph Garza Jr.	RHP	Oklahoma	(Texas)	Y
28	829	Zac Grotz	RHP	Embry–Riddle	(California)	Y
35	1039	Kody Clemens	SS	Texas—Austin	(Texas)	N (Note: Signed with the Detroit Tigers from the 2018 draft.)
Ref.:

== Statistics ==
Table legend
*	Left-handed batter or pitcher	League leader (Bold: MLB leader)
#	Switch hitter	League top ten
	Leader in appearances at position	Team leader

=== Batting ===
Statistics legend
⌖	Position	AB	At bats	2B	Doubles	RBI	Runs batted in	SB	Stolen bases	SLG	Slugging percentage
G	Games played	R	Runs scored	3B	Triples	BB	Bases on balls	AVG	Batting average	OPS	On-base plus slugging percentage
PA	Plate appearances	H	Hits	HR	Home runs	SO	Strikeouts	OBP	On-base percentage

==== Regular season results ====
⌖	Player	G	PA	AB	R	H	2B	3B	HR	RBI	BB	SO	SB	Avg	OBP	SLG	OPS
C	Jason Castro*	104	375	337	38	71	19	0	11	31	33	115	0	.211	.283	.365	.648
1B	Chris Carter	129	460	391	50	78	17	0	24	64	57	151	1	.199	.307	.427	.734
2B	Jose Altuve	154	689	**638**	86	200	40	4	15	66	33	67	38	.313	.353	.459	.812
SS	Carlos Correa	99	432	387	52	108	22	1	22	68	40	78	14	.279	.345	.512	.857
3B	Luis Valbuena*	132	493	434	62	97	18	0	25	56	50	106	1	.224	.310	.438	.748
LF	Preston Tucker*	98	323	300	35	73	19	0	13	33	20	68	0	.243	.297	.437	.734
CF	Jake Marisnick	133	372	339	46	80	15	4	9	36	18	105	24	.236	.281	.383	.665
RF	George Springer	102	451	388	59	107	19	2	16	41	50	109	16	.276	.367	.459	.826
DH	Evan Gattis	153	604	566	66	139	20	11	27	88	30	119	0	.246	.285	.463	.748
OF	Colby Rasmus*	137	485	432	67	103	23	2	25	61	47	154	2	.238	.314	.475	.789
IF	Marwin González^{#}	120	370	344	44	96	18	1	12	34	16	74	4	.279	.317	.442	.759
IF	Jed Lowrie^{#}	69	263	230	35	51	14	0	9	30	28	43	1	.222	.312	.400	.712
C	Hank Conger^{#}	73	229	201	25	46	11	0	11	33	23	63	0	.229	.311	.448	.759
CF	Carlos Gómez	41	163	149	19	36	9	0	4	13	8	31	10	.242	.288	.383	.670
IF	Jonathan Villar^{#}	53	128	116	18	33	7	1	2	11	10	29	7	.284	.339	.414	.752
1B	Jon Singleton*	13	58	47	6	9	2	0	1	6	10	17	1	.191	.328	.298	.625
LF	Robbie Grossman^{#}	24	54	49	7	7	2	0	1	5	5	17	0	.143	.222	.245	.467
OF	Domingo Santana	14	42	39	6	10	2	0	2	8	2	17	2	.256	.310	.462	.771
C	Max Stassi	11	17	15	4	6	0	0	1	2	1	5	0	.400	.438	.600	1.038
OF	L. J. Hoes	8	15	16	1	4	0	0	0	1	1	3	0	.267	.313	.267	.579
OF	Alex Presley*	8	13	12	1	3	0	0	0	1	1	5	0	.250	.308	.250	.558
CI	Matt Duffy	8	9	8	0	3	1	0	0	3	1	2	0	.375	.444	.500	.944
P	Collin McHugh	32	8	8	1	1	0	0	0	0	0	4	0	.125	.125	.125	.250
P	Dallas Keuchel*	33	6	5	0	1	0	0	0	0	0	4	0	.200	.200	.200	.400
P	Roberto Hernández	20	3	2	1	0	0	0	0	0	1	2	0	.000	.333	.000	.333
P	Brett Oberholtzer*	8	3	0	0	0	0	0	0	0	1	0	0		1.000		1.000
P	Lance McCullers Jr.*	22	2	2	0	0	0	0	0	0	0	1	0	.000	.000	.000	.000
P	Scott Feldman*	18	2	2	0	1	0	0	0	0	0	1	0	.500	.500	.500	1.000
P	Scott Kazmir*	13	2	2	0	0	0	0	0	0	0	1	0	.000	.000	.000	.000
P	Will Harris	44	1	1	0	0	0	0	0	0	0	1	0	.000	.000	.000	.000
Team batting totals		162	6073	5459	729	1363	278	26	230	691	486	1392	121	.250	.315	.437	.752
Team rate stats leaders qualified at 243 PA (if not league leaders) • Source:

==== Postseason results ====
Player	G	PA	AB	R	H	2B	3B	HR	RBI	BB	SO	SB	TB	AVG	OBP	SLG	OPS
Jose Altuve	6	27	26	2	4	0	0	0	2	1	3	1	4	.154	.185	.154	.339
George Springer	6	26	23	5	5	2	0	1	3	3	11	0	10	.217	.308	.435	.742
Carlos Correa	6	25	24	2	7	1	0	2	4	0	6	0	14	.292	.320	.583	.903
Colby Rasmus*	6	24	17	4	7	1	0	4	6	7	7	1	20	.412	**.583**	**1.176**	**1.760**
Evan Gattis	6	23	23	1	4	0	0	0	1	0	6	0	4	.174	.174	.174	.348
Luis Valbuena*	6	21	17	2	3	0	0	1	2	4	8	0	6	.176	.333	.353	.686
Chris Carter	6	20	17	3	5	1	0	1	1	3	7	0	9	.294	.400	.529	.929
Jason Castro*	6	18	16	1	1	0	0	0	2	2	8	0	1	.063	.167	.063	.229
Carlos Gómez	6	15	15	2	4	0	0	2	3	0	4	0	10	.267	.267	.667	.933
Jake Marisnick	4	7	7	1	3	1	0	0	0	0	2	0	4	.429	.429	.571	1.000
Jed Lowrie^{#}	4	4	4	0	0	0	0	0	0	0	1	0	0	.000	.000	.000	.000
Marwin González^{#}	4	3	3	0	0	0	0	0	0	0	2	0	0	.000	.000	.000	.000
Preston Tucker*	3	3	2	0	0	0	0	0	0	1	2	0	0	.000	.333	.000	.333
Hank Conger^{#}	1	0	0	0	0	0	0	0	0	0	0	0	0				
Jonathan Villar^{#}	1	0	0	1	0	0	0	0	0	0	0	1	0				
Batting totals	6	216	192	24	43	6	0	11	24	21	67	3	82	.222	.301	.423	.724

=== Pitching ===
Stats key: W = Wins; L = Losses; ERA = Earned run average; G = Games pitched; GS = Games started; Hld = Holds; SV = Saves; IP = Innings pitched; H = Hits allowed; R = Runs allowed; ER = Earned runs allowed; HR = Home runs allowed; BB = Walks allowed; K = Strikeouts; BF = Batters faced; WHIP = Walks plus hits per inning pitched. Team rate stats leaders qualified at 243 batted faced.

==== Regular season results ====
⌖	Player	W	L	ERA	G	GS	Hld	SV	IP	H	R	ER	HR	BB	K	WHIP
SP	Dallas Keuchel*	20	8	2.48	33	33	0	0	232	185	68	64	17	51	216	1.017
SP	Collin McHugh	19	7	3.89	32	32	0	0	203 2/3	207	89	88	19	53	171	1.277
SP	Lance McCullers Jr.	6	7	3.22	22	22	0	0	125 2/3	106	49	45	10	43	129	1.186
SP	Scott Feldman	5	5	3.90	18	18	0	0	108 1/3	115	49	47	13	27	61	1.311
SP	Roberto Hernández	3	5	4.36	20	11	0	0	84 2/3	90	48	41	9	26	42	1.370
SP	Scott Kazmir*	2	6	4.17	13	13	0	0	73 1/3	78	42	34	13	24	54	1.391
CL	Luke Gregerson	7	3	3.10	64	0	0	31	61	48	24	21	5	10	59	0.951
SU	Pat Neshek	3	6	3.62	66	0	28	1	54 2/3	49	25	22	8	12	51	1.116
RP	Will Harris	5	5	1.90	68	0	13	2	71	42	18	15	8	22	68	0.901
RP	Tony Sipp*	3	4	1.99	60	0	13	0	54 1/3	41	13	12	5	15	62	1.031
RP	Josh Fields	4	1	3.55	54	0	5	0	50 2/3	39	20	20	2	19	67	1.145
RP	Chad Qualls	3	5	4.38	60	0	10	4	49 1/3	46	24	24	6	9	46	1.115
SP	Mike Fiers	2	1	3.32	10	9	0	0	62 1/3	45	26	23	10	21	59	1.059
SW	Vince Velasquez	1	1	4.37	19	7	0	0	55 2/3	50	28	27	5	21	58	1.275
SP	Brett Oberholtzer*	2	2	4.46	8	8	0	0	38 1/3	44	21	19	4	17	27	1.591
LH	Joe Thatcher*	1	3	3.18	43	0	6	0	22 2/3	23	8	8	1	12	26	1.544
LR	Sam Deduno	0	1	6.86	9	2	0	1	21	24	16	16	3	9	17	1.571
SP	Dan Straily	0	1	5.40	4	3	0	0	16 2/3	16	11	10	2	8	14	1.440
SP	Asher Wojciechowski	0	1	7.16	5	3	0	0	16 1/3	23	13	13	2	7	16	1.837
LH	Óliver Pérez*	0	3	6.75	22	0	3	0	12	14	12	9	2	4	14	1.500
LR	Jake Buchanan	0	0	2.00	5	0	0	0	9	5	2	2	1	4	5	1.000
LR	Michael Feliz	0	0	7.88	5	0	0	0	8	9	7	7	2	4	7	1.625
LR	Kevin Chapman*	0	0	3.38	3	0	1	0	5 1/3	4	2	2	1	3	8	1.313
SP	Brad Peacock	0	1	5.40	1	1	0	0	5	5	3	3	0	2	3	1.400
Team totals		86	76	3.57	162	162	79	39	1441	1308	618	572	148	423	1280	1.201
Other: Complete games—Keuchel (3), Fiers (1), McCullers Jr. (1) • Shutouts—Keuchel (2), Fiers (1) • Sources:

== Awards and achievements ==
=== Grand slams ===
No.	Date	Astros batter	Venue	Inning	Pitcher	Opposing team	Box
1	August 1	Hank Conger (Note: 1st MLB grand slam)	Minute Maid Park	4	Jeremy Hellickson	Arizona Diamondbacks	
2	August 3	Jason Castro	Globe Life Park	4	Colby Lewis	Texas Rangers	
3	September 4	Hank Conger	Minute Maid Park	4	Mike Pelfrey	Minnesota Twins	
4	September 6	Jed Lowrie	Minute Maid Park	7 (Note: Tied score or took lead)	Trevor May	Minnesota Twins	

=== Career honors ===
Astros elected to Baseball Hall of Fame
Individual	Position	Houston Astros career					Induction	
Individual	Position	Uni.	Seasons	Games	Start	Finish	Induction	
Craig Biggio	Second baseman	7 (Note: Uniform number retired during 2008 season. Previously wore number 4 (1988 and 1989).)	20	2,850	1988	2007	Class	Inducted as an Astro • Plaque
Randy Johnson	Starting pitcher	51	1	11	1998		Class	Plaque
See also: Members of the Baseball Hall of Fame • Sources:

=== Annual awards ===
2015 Houston Astros award winners
Name of award		Recipient	Ref.
American League (AL) Cy Young Award		Dallas Keuchel	
American League (AL) Pitcher of the Month	April	Dallas Keuchel	
American League (AL) Pitcher of the Month	May	Dallas Keuchel	
American League (AL) Pitcher of the Month	July	Scott Kazmir (Note: Includes 3 games as a member of the Oakland Athletics and 2 as a member of the Astros.)	
American League (AL) Pitcher of the Month	August	Dallas Keuchel	
American League (AL) Player of the Week	May 3	Jose Altuve (Note: Co-winner with Josh Reddick of the Oakland Athletics.)	
American League (AL) Player of the Week	July 19	Dallas Keuchel (Note: Co-winner with Lorenzo Cain of the Kansas City Royals.)	
American League (AL) Player of the Week	August 24	Mike Fiers	
American League (AL) Rookie of the Month	June	Carlos Correa	
American League (AL) Rookie of the Year		Carlos Correa	
Darryl Kile Good Guy Award		Hank Conger	
Fielding Bible Award	Pitcher	Dallas Keuchel	
Gold Glove Award (Note: The last occurrence with multiple Astros Gold Glove winners was in 1994 with Jeff Bagwell and Craig Biggio.)	Second baseman	Jose Altuve	
Gold Glove Award	Pitcher	Dallas Keuchel	
MLB All-Star Game	Starting second baseman	Jose Altuve	
MLB All-Star Game	Starting pitcher	Dallas Keuchel	
Silver Slugger Award	Second baseman	Jose Altuve	
Topps All-Star Rookie Team	Shortstop	Carlos Correa	
Warren Spahn		Dallas Keuchel	

Other awards results

Name of award	Voting recipient(s) (Team)	Ref.
AL Cy Young	1st—Keuchel (HOU) • 8th—McHugh (HOU)	
AL Manager of the Year	1st—Banister (TEX) • 2nd—Hinch (HOU)	
AL Most Valuable Player	1st—Donaldson (TOR) • 5th—Keuchel (HOU) • 10th—Altuve (HOU); Other Astros: 24th—Correa	
Roberto Clemente	Winner—McCutchen (PIT) • Nominee—Springer (HOU)	

=== Statistical leaders ===
==== All players ====
2015 AL leaders
Category	Player	Figure	Rank
Wins Above Replacement (WAR)— all Bref (Note: Per Baseball-Reference.com.)	Dallas Keuchel	6.6	6th
Ref.:

==== Batters ====
2015 AL batting leaders
Category	Player	Figure	Rank
WAR—defense	Jake Marisnick	1.7	6th
Batting average (AVG)	Jose Altuve	.313	3rd
Plate appearances	Jose Altuve	689	5th
Hits	Jose Altuve	200	1st
Singles	Jose Altuve	141	2nd
Doubles (2B)	Jose Altuve	40	6th
Triples (3B)	Evan Gattis	11	3rd
Strikeouts (SO)	Colby Rasmus	154	6th
Strikeouts (SO)	Chris Carter	151	8th
Stolen bases (SB)	Jose Altuve	38	1st
Stolen bases (SB)	Jake Marisnick	24	8th
Times on base	Jose Altuve	242	8th
Sacrifice hits	Marwin González	7	8th
Caught stealing (CS)	Jose Altuve	13	1st
Caught stealing (CS)	Jake Marisnick	9	3rd
Stolen base percentage (SB%)	George Springer	80.00	7th
Stolen base percentage (SB%)	Carlos Correa	77.78	10th
Intentional bases on balls	Jose Altuve	8	9th
Power–speed number	Jose Altuve	21.5	2nd
Power–speed number	Carlos Correa	17.1	7th
Power–speed number	George Springer	16.0	10th
At bats per strikeout	Jose Altuve	9.5	2nd
Outs made	Jose Altuve	477	9th
Championship WPA	George Springer	2.5	5th
Ref.:

==== Pitchers ====
2015 AL pitching leaders
Category	Player	Figure	Rank
WAR—pitching	Dallas Keuchel	6.5	1st
Earned run average (ERA)	Dallas Keuchel	2.48	2nd
Earned run average (ERA)	Scott Kazmir	3.10 (Note: Includes totals with both the Oakland Athletics and the Houston Astros.)	4th
Wins	Dallas Keuchel	20	1st
Wins	Collin McHugh	19	2nd
Win–loss percentage	Collin McHugh	.731	3rd
Win–loss percentage	Dallas Keuchel	.714	5th
WHIP	Dallas Keuchel	1.017	1st
Hits per nine innings (H/9)	Dallas Keuchel	7.177	2nd
BB/9	Dallas Keuchel	1.978	8th
Strikeouts per nine innings (K/9)	Dallas Keuchel	8.379	10th
Holds (Hld)	Pat Neshek	28	3rd
Games finished	Luke Gregerson	53	3rd
Saves (SV)	Luke Gregerson	31	10th
Innings pitched (IP)	Dallas Keuchel	232	1st
Strikeouts (SO or K)	Dallas Keuchel	216	5th
Games started (GS)	Dallas Keuchel	33	2nd
Games started (GS)	Collin McHugh	32	7th
Complete games (CG)	Dallas Keuchel	3	3rd
Shutouts (ShO)	Dallas Keuchel	2	1st
Shutouts (ShO)	Mike Fiers	1	6th
Hits allowed (H)	Collin McHugh	207	5th
Strikeout-to-walk ratio (K/BB)	Dallas Keuchel	4.325	5th
Home runs per nine innings (HR/9)	Dallas Keuchel	0.659	2nd
Batters faced	Dallas Keuchel	911	1st
Batters faced	Collin McHugh	859	10th
Adjusted ERA+	Dallas Keuchel	157	2nd
Adjusted ERA+	Scott Kazmir	126	5th
Fielding Independent Pitching (FIP)	Dallas Keuchel	2.91	5th
Fielding Independent Pitching (FIP)	Collin McHugh	3.58	10th
Adjusted pitching runs	Dallas Keuchel	38	1st
Adjusted pitching runs	Will Harris	15	9th
Adjusted pitching wins	Dallas Keuchel	4.2	1st
Base out runs saved (RE24)	Dallas Keuchel	39.84	1st
Base out runs saved (RE24)	Will Harris	22.17	5th
Win probability added (WPA)	Dallas Keuchel	4.1	4th
Situational wins saved (WPA/LI)	Dallas Keuchel	4.8	1st
Championship WPA (cWPA)	Dallas Keuchel	3.1	4th
Base-out wins saved (REW)	Dallas Keuchel	4.5	1st
Base-out wins saved (REW)	Will Harris	2.3	6th
Refs.:

=== Milestones ===
==== Major League debuts ====
Houston Astros 2015 MLB debuts
Player—Appeared at position

- Asher Wojciechowski, starting pitcher
- Preston Tucker, left fielder
- Lance McCullers Jr., starting pitcher
- Michael Feliz, relief pitcher
- Carlos Correa, shortstop
- Vince Velasquez, starting pitcher
- Matt Duffy, third baseman
Date and opponent

- April 9 vs CLE
- May 7 vs LAA
- May 18 vs OAK
- May 31 vs CHW
- June 8 at CHW
- June 10 at CHW
- September 16 at TEX
Ref.

Also:

== Minor league system ==
Level	Team	League	Manager
AAA	Fresno Grizzlies	Pacific Coast League	Tony DeFrancesco
AA	Corpus Christi Hooks	Texas League	Rodney Linares
A-Advanced	Lancaster JetHawks	California League	Omar López
A	Quad Cities River Bandits	Midwest League	Josh Bonifay
A-Short Season	Tri-City ValleyCats	New York–Penn League	Ed Romero
Rookie	Greeneville Astros	Appalachian League	Lamarr Rogers
Rookie	GCL Astros	Arizona League	Marty Malloy
Rookie	DSL Astros	Dominican Summer League	Neder Horta

=== Summary ===
On May 31, following his promotion to Lancaster, Derek Fisher set a California League record with 12 RBI in his debut for the team. Fisher homered thrice, including two grand slams.

=== Championships ===
- Appalachian League champions: Greeneville
- Pacific Coast League champions: Fresno
- Triple-A National Champions: Fresno

=== Awards ===
- California League Most Valuable Player Award (MVP): A. J. Reed
- Joe Bauman Home Run Award: A. J. Reed
- Midwest League Manager of the Year: Josh Bonifay
- Pacific Coast League Most Valuable Player (PCL MVP): Matt Duffy, 3B
- Triple-A National Championship Most Valuable Player (MVP): Chris Devenski, SP

== See also ==
- List of Major League Baseball All-Star Game starting pitchers
- List of Major League Baseball annual shutout leaders
- List of Major League Baseball annual stolen base leaders
- List of Major League Baseball annual wins leaders
- List of Major League Baseball franchise postseason streaks
- List of Major League Baseball league leaders in hits 3 or more consecutive seasons
- List of Major League Baseball no-hitters
- List of Major League Baseball titles leaders
