= Matt Duffy (baseball, born 1989) =

American baseball player

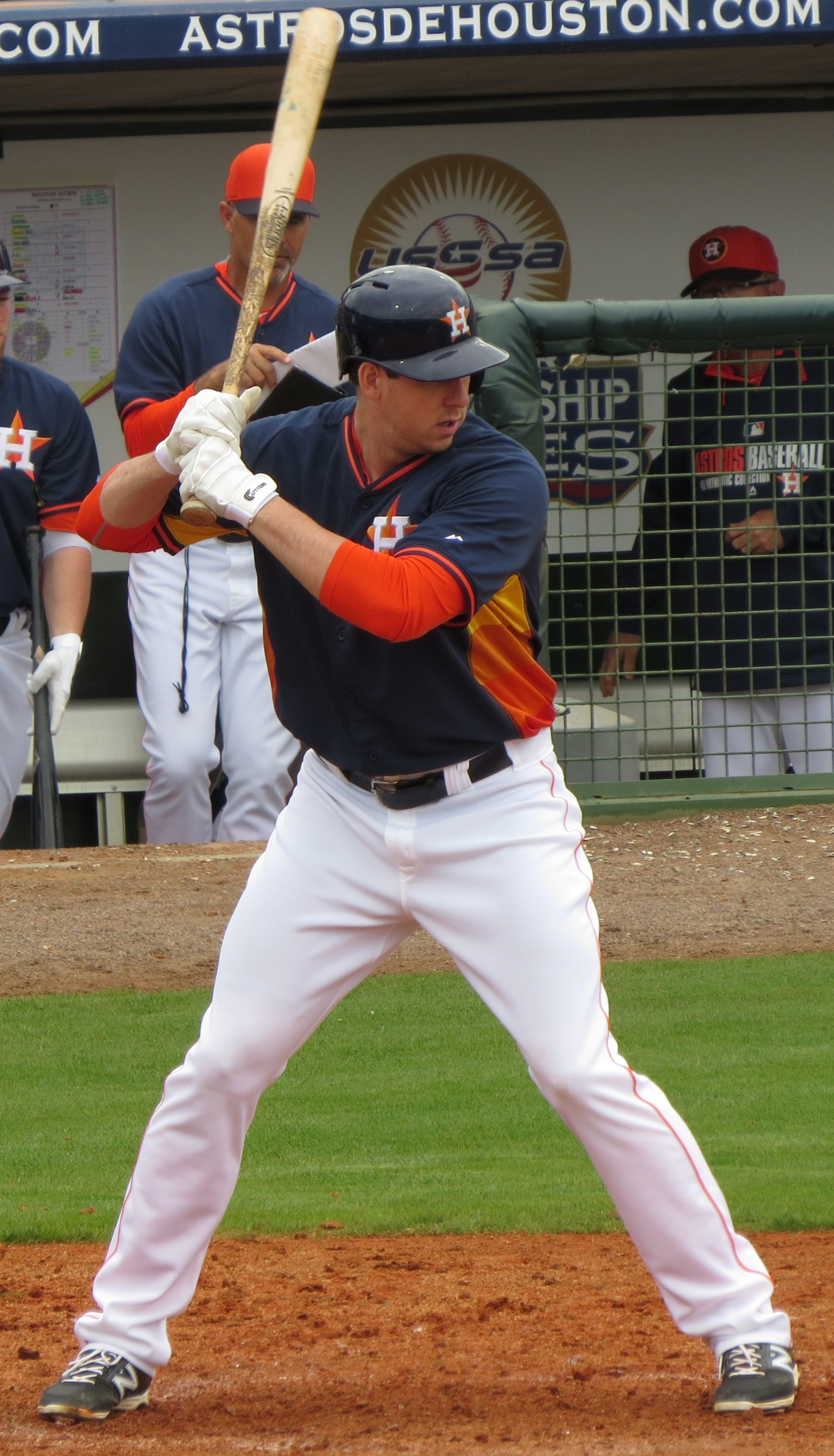
- Duffy batting for the Houston Astros in 2015 Spring Training
- Third baseman / First baseman
- Born: February 6, 1989 (age 37); Milton, Massachusetts, U.S.
- Batted: Right Threw: Right

Professional debut
- MLB: September 16, 2015, for the Houston Astros
- NPB: March 31, 2017, for the Chiba Lotte Marines

Last appearance
- MLB: April 9, 2016, for the Houston Astros
- NPB: June 17, 2017, for the Chiba Lotte Marines

MLB statistics
- Batting average: .273
- Home runs: 0
- Runs batted in: 3

NPB statistics
- Batting average: .201
- Hits: 33
- Home runs: 6
- Runs batted in: 18
- Stats at Baseball Reference

Teams
- Houston Astros (2015–2016); Chiba Lotte Marines (2017)

Matthew Edward Duffy (born February 6, 1989) is an American former professional baseball corner infielder. He played in Major League Baseball (MLB) for the Houston Astros, and in Nippon Professional Baseball (NPB) for the Chiba Lotte Marines.

== Career ==
=== Amateur ===
Duffy attended Saint Sebastian's School in Needham, Massachusetts where he was named Independent School League MVP. He enrolled at the University of Vermont and played college baseball for the Vermont Catamounts in 2008 and 2009. In 2009, Duffy was named the America East Conference's Player of the Year. After the 2009 season, he played collegiate summer baseball with the Chatham Anglers of the Cape Cod Baseball League. After Vermont discontinued its baseball team, he transferred to the University of Tennessee and played for the Tennessee Volunteers for two years.

=== Houston Astros ===
The Houston Astros selected Duffy in the 20th round of the 2011 Major League Baseball draft. In 2015, he was named the Pacific Coast League (PCL) MVP.

The Astros called Duffy up to the majors for the first time on September 14, 2015.

On Friday, October 2, 2015, Duffy contributed to Astros history, breaking the club record by surpassing 20 runs in a game with a single off A.J. Schugel that scored George Springer and Jonathan Villar for Houston's final runs against the Arizona Diamondbacks.

=== Texas Rangers ===
On July 16, 2016, Duffy was designated for assignment by the Astros and claimed by the Texas Rangers on July 23, 2016.

=== Chiba Lotte Marines ===
On November 14, 2016, Duffy signed with the Chiba Lotte Marines of Nippon Professional Baseball.

=== Matt Duffy Baseball Academy ===
Duffy is the current owner and founder of the Matt Duffy Baseball Academy which opened in July 2019, located in Weymouth, MA. Duffy offers instruction for both individuals and groups. The MDBA is also home to the MDB Knights, a club baseball team for youth baseball players.

=== St. Sebastian's School ===
Duffy became an Assistant Baseball coach for his alma mater for the 2022-23 season. He was named head coach ahead of the 2023-24 school year. Duffy led the Arrows to an ISL Championship in 2024.
