= Hank Conger =

American baseball player (born 1988)

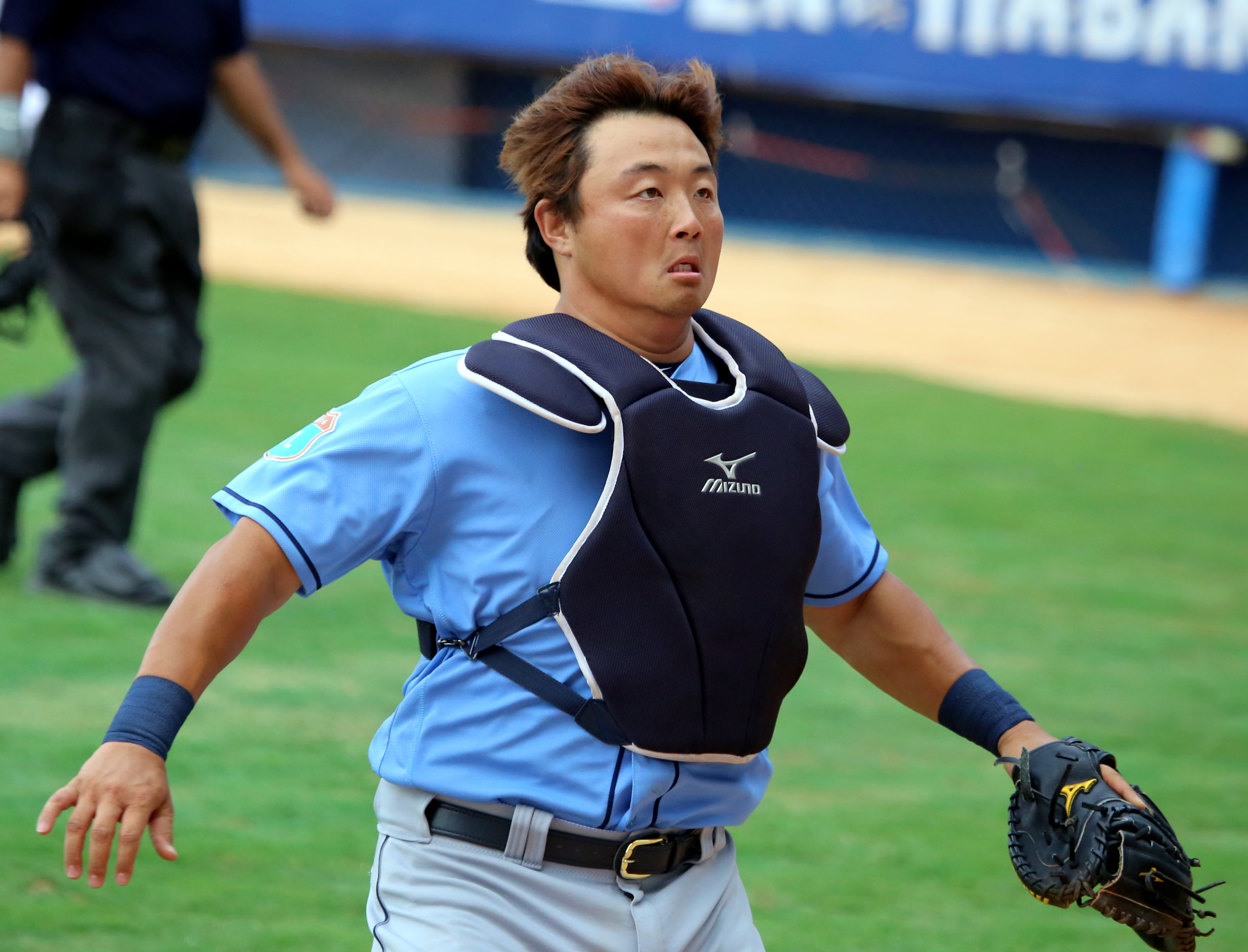
- Conger with the Tampa Bay Rays in 2016

Baltimore Orioles – No. 51
- Catcher / Coach
- Born: January 29, 1988 (age 38); Federal Way, Washington, U.S.
- Batted: Switch Threw: Right

MLB debut
- September 11, 2010, for the Los Angeles Angels of Anaheim

Last MLB appearance
- July 8, 2016, for the Tampa Bay Rays

MLB statistics
- Batting average: .221
- Home runs: 31
- Runs batted in: 114
- Stats at Baseball Reference

Teams
- As player: Los Angeles Angels of Anaheim (2010–2014); Houston Astros (2015); Tampa Bay Rays (2016); As coach: Lotte Giants (2020–2021); Minnesota Twins (2022–2025); Baltimore Orioles (2026–present)
Korean name
Hangul	최현
RR	Choe Hyeon
MR	Ch'oe Hyŏn

Hyun Choi "Hank" Conger (born January 29, 1988) is an American former professional baseball catcher who currently serves as the bullpen coach for the Baltimore Orioles of Major League Baseball (MLB). Conger was selected in the first round of the 2006 MLB draft by the Los Angeles Angels of Anaheim. He played in MLB for the Angels, Houston Astros, and Tampa Bay Rays from 2010 to 2016. Conger coached for the Lotte Giants of the KBO League from 2020 to 2021, and the Minnesota Twins from 2022 to 2025.

== Early life ==
Conger was born in Federal Way, Washington, but was raised in Huntington Beach, California. Conger's mother, Eun, immigrated from South Korea in 1986 and his father, Yun, was adopted from Korea by a United States Navy petty officer and raised in the United States.

Conger originally played basketball due to his size, but began playing baseball at the age of eight and turned his focus there instead. Conger graduated from Huntington Beach High School in 2006, where he was a second team All-American and Gatorade Player of the Year. Conger had planned to attend the University of Southern California if he had not been drafted in the first round.

== Professional career ==
=== Los Angeles Angels of Anaheim ===
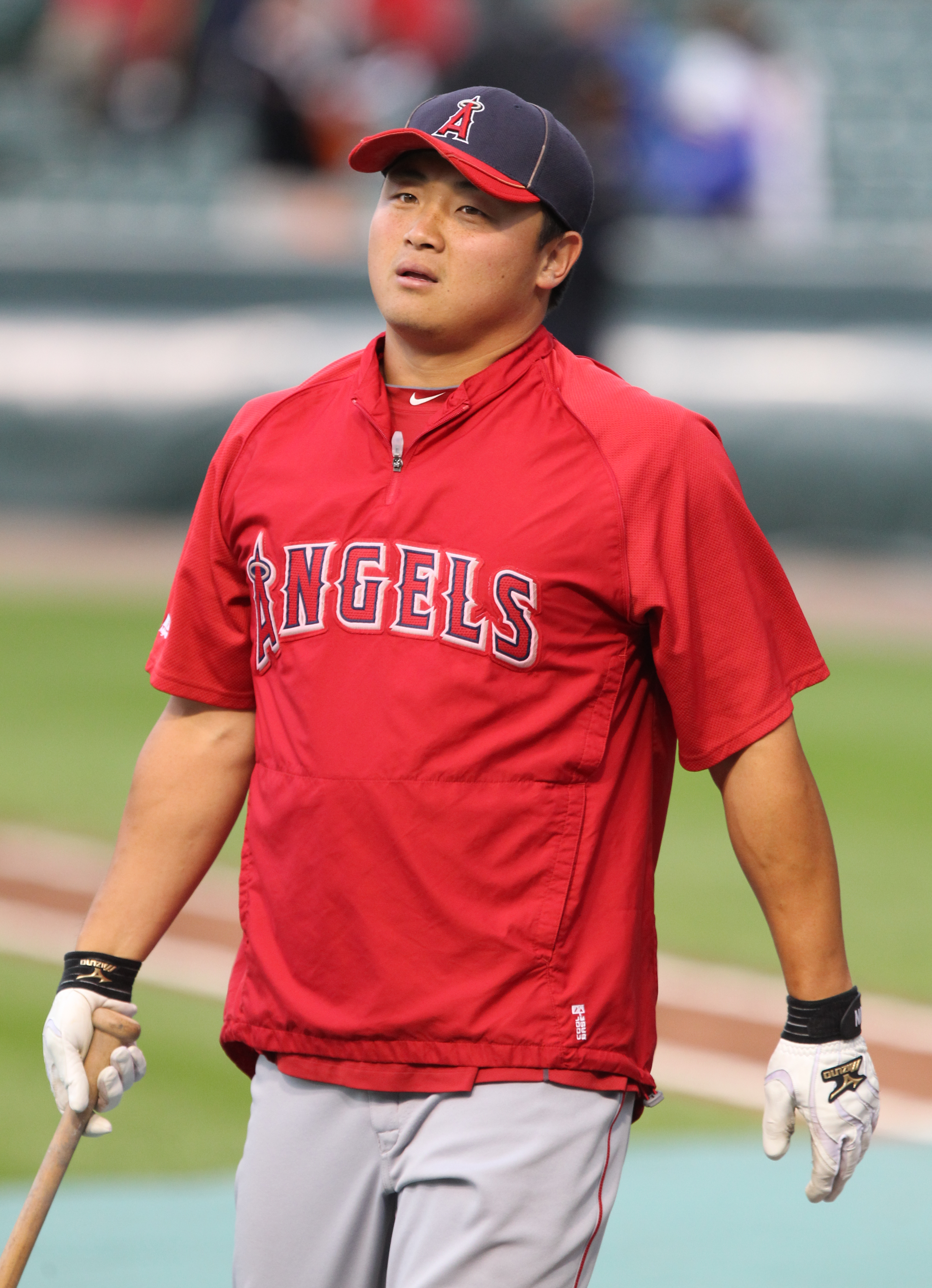
Conger with the Los Angeles Angels of Anaheim in 2011

The Los Angeles Angels of Anaheim selected Conger in the first round, with the 25th overall selection, of the 2006 Major League Baseball draft. He was selected to represent the United States in the 2010 All-Star Futures Game. He hit a three-run home run, earning him MVP honors.

He was promoted to the major leagues as part of September call-ups on September 7, 2010. He made his major league debut on September 11, 2010, as a pinch hitter for Hideki Matsui. His first hit in the major leagues came off of Cleveland Indians pitcher Jeanmar Gómez on September 15, 2010. His first home run came off of Jeff Niemann on April 5, 2011.

On July 19, 2011, Conger was optioned to the Salt Lake Bees of the Class AAA Pacific Coast League (PCL) to make room on the Angels' active roster for Tyler Chatwood. At the time, Conger was hitting .194 and opponents had been successful at stealing bases 48 out of 56 attempts against him. On August 18, 2011, the Angels recalled Conger.

=== Houston Astros ===
On November 5, 2014, the Angels traded Conger to the Houston Astros in exchange for Nick Tropeano and Carlos Perez. Conger connected for his first career grand slam on August 1 off Jeremy Hellickson in the fourth inning versus Arizona Diamondbacks. He also had homered earlier in the second inning for his first career multi-home run game to lead a 9–2 win. Despite hitting 11 homers in a part time role for the Astros, Conger did not control the running game. He was recognized by the Houston chapter of the Baseball Writers' Association of America (BBWAA) as the recipient of the Darryl Kile Good Guy Award.

=== Tampa Bay Rays ===
On December 2, 2015, the Tampa Bay Rays acquired Conger for cash considerations. Conger opened the 2016 season in a platoon with Curt Casali. Conger hit .194 before being optioned to the Durham Bulls on July 11, 2016.

=== Arizona Diamondbacks ===
Conger signed a minor league contract with the Arizona Diamondbacks on February 9, 2017. He played in 58 games for the Triple–A Reno Aces, batting .239/.316/.394 with six home runs and 40 RBI. Conger was released by the Diamondbacks organization on July 28.

=== Pericos de Puebla ===
On May 4, 2018, Conger signed with the Pericos de Puebla of the Mexican League. He was released on July 11.

== Post-playing career ==
=== Lotte Giants ===
On December 24, 2019, Conger joined the coaching staff of the Lotte Giants of the KBO League as the team's new catching coach.

=== Minnesota Twins ===
On December 10, 2021, the Minnesota Twins hired Conger as the first base and catching coach. On November 7, 2025, it was announced that Conger would not be returning to the team for the 2026 season.

=== Baltimore Orioles ===
On November 20, 2025, the Baltimore Orioles hired Conger to serve as the team's bullpen coach under new manager Craig Albernaz.

== See also ==
- Houston Astros award winners and league leaders
