= 2015 Arizona Diamondbacks season =

2015 Arizona Diamondbacks
- League: National League
- Division: West
- Ballpark: Chase Field
- City: Phoenix, Arizona
- Record: 79–83 (.488)
- Divisional place: 3rd
- Owners: Ken Kendrick
- General managers: Dave Stewart
- Managers: Chip Hale
- Television: Fox Sports Arizona (Steve Berthiaume, Bob Brenly, Greg Schulte, Kate Longworth)
- Radio: KMVP-FM (98.7) (Greg Schulte, Tom Candiotti, Jeff Munn); KSUN (Spanish) (Oscar Soria, Miguel Quintana)
- Stats: ESPN.com; Baseball Reference

The Arizona Diamondbacks' 2015 season was the franchise's 18th season in Major League Baseball and their 18th season at Chase Field.

== Offseason ==
- November 4: Signed Walter Ibarra to a minor league contract.
- November 6: Signed Matt Pagnozzi to a minor league contract.
- Week of November 13: Signed 3 players to a minor league contract and received Jeremy Hellickson from the Tampa Bay Rays for Andrew Velazquez and Justin Williams.
- Week of November 20: Signed 8 players to a minor league contract, promoted 5 from the minors, sent 2 to the minors, and sent Charles Brewer and Mike Bolsinger to the Cleveland Indians and the Los Angeles Dodgers, respectively, for cash.
- December 1: Signed J. C. Ramirez to a minor league contract.
- December 5: Sent Didi Gregorius to the New York Yankees and received Domingo Leyba and Robbie Ray from the Detroit Tigers in a three-team deal.
- December 8: Signed Yasmany Tomas and sent Zeke Spruill to the minors.
- December 9: Received Jeferson Mejia and Zack Godley from the Chicago Cubs for Miguel Montero.
- December 11: Drafted Oscar Hernández.
- Week of December 12: Signed 4 players to a minor league contract and conducted the following trades:
- Sent Eury De La Rosa to the Oakland Athletics for cash.
- Received Myles Smith, Rubby De La Rosa, Allen Webster, and Raymel Flores to the Boston Red Sox for Zeke Spruill and Wade Miley.
- December 23: Signed Scott Kalamar to a minor league contract.
- December 28: Signed Jordan Pacheco to a minor league contract.
- Month of January 2015: Signed 8 players to a minor league contract.
- February 2: Signed Gerald Laird to a minor league contract.
- February 10: Signed 3 players to a minor league contract.

== Regular season ==
=== Season standings ===
==== National League West ====
NL West
Team	W	L	Pct.	GB	Home	Road
Los Angeles Dodgers	92	70	.568	—	55‍–‍26	37‍–‍44
San Francisco Giants	84	78	.519	8	47‍–‍34	37‍–‍44
Arizona Diamondbacks	79	83	.488	13	39‍–‍42	40‍–‍41
San Diego Padres	74	88	.457	18	39‍–‍42	35‍–‍46
Colorado Rockies	68	94	.420	24	36‍–‍45	32‍–‍49

==== National League Wild Card ====
Division leaders
Team	W	L	Pct.
St. Louis Cardinals	100	62	.617
Los Angeles Dodgers	92	70	.568
New York Mets	90	72	.556

Wild Card teams (Top 2 teams qualify for postseason)
Team	W	L	Pct.	GB
Pittsburgh Pirates	98	64	.605	+1
Chicago Cubs	97	65	.599	—
San Francisco Giants	84	78	.519	13
Washington Nationals	83	79	.512	14
Arizona Diamondbacks	79	83	.488	18
San Diego Padres	74	88	.457	23
Miami Marlins	71	91	.438	26
Milwaukee Brewers	68	94	.420	29
Colorado Rockies	68	94	.420	29
Atlanta Braves	67	95	.414	30
Cincinnati Reds	64	98	.395	33
Philadelphia Phillies	63	99	.389	34

==== Record vs. opponents ====
2015 National League record Source: MLB Standings Grid – 2015
Team	AZ	ATL	CHC	CIN	COL	LAD	MIA	MIL	NYM	PHI	PIT	SD	SF	STL	WSH	AL
Arizona	—	3–3	2–4	6–1	13–6	6–13	5–2	5–2	2–5	2–4	1–5	9–10	11–8	0–7	3–4	11–9
Atlanta	3–3	—	1–6	3–4	1–6	3–3	10–9	5–2	8–11	11–8	2–4	2–5	3–4	4–2	5–14	6–14
Chicago	4–2	6–1	—	13–6	4–2	3–4	3–3	14–5	7–0	2–5	11–8	3–3	5–2	8–11	4–3	10–10
Cincinnati	1–6	4–3	6–13	—	2–4	1–6	3–4	9–10	0–7	4–2	11–8	2–4	2–5	7–12	5–1	7–13
Colorado	6–13	6–1	2–4	4–2	—	8–11	2–5	5–1	0–7	5–2	1–6	7–12	11–8	3–4	3–3	5–15
Los Angeles	13–6	3–3	4–3	6–1	11–8	—	4–2	4–3	3–4	5–2	1–5	14–5	8–11	2–5	4–2	10–10
Miami	2–5	9–10	3–3	4–3	5–2	2–4	—	4–2	8–11	9–10	1–6	2–5	5–2	1–5	9–10	7–13
Milwaukee	2–5	2–5	5–14	10–9	1–5	3–4	2–4	—	3–3	7–0	10–9	5–2	1–5	6–13	3–4	8–12
New York	5–2	11–8	0–7	7–0	7–0	4–3	11–8	3–3	—	14–5	0–6	2–4	3–3	3–4	11–8	9–11
Philadelphia	4–2	8–11	5–2	2–4	2–5	2–5	10–9	0–7	5–14	—	2–5	5–1	1–5	2–5	7–12	8–12
Pittsburgh	5–1	4–2	8–11	8–11	6–1	5–1	6–1	9–10	6–0	5–2	—	5–2	6–1	9–10	3–4	13–7
San Diego	10–9	5–2	3–3	4–2	12–7	5–14	5–2	2–5	4–2	1–5	2–5	—	8–11	4–3	2–5	7–13
San Francisco	8–11	4–3	2–5	5–2	8–11	11–8	2–5	5–1	3–3	5–1	1–6	11–8	—	2–4	4–3	13–7
St. Louis	7–0	2–4	11–8	12–7	4–3	5–2	5–1	13–6	4–3	5–2	10–9	3–4	4–2	—	4–2	11–9
Washington	4–3	14–5	3–4	1–5	3–3	2–4	10–9	4–3	8–11	12–7	4–3	5–2	3–4	2–4	—	8–12

=== Game log ===
2015 Game Log (79–83)
April: 10–11 (Home: 6–8; Away: 4–3)

#	Date	Opponent	Score	Win	Loss	Save	Attendance	Record
1	April 6	Giants	4–5	Bumgarner (1–0)	**Collmenter** (0–1)	Casilla (1)	49,043	0–1
2	April 7	Giants	7–6	**De La Rosa** (1–0)	Vogelsong (0–1)	**Reed** (1)	22,626	1–1
3	April 8	Giants	2–5	Heston (1–0)	**Hellickson** (0–1)	Casilla (2)	21,642	1–2
4	April 10	Dodgers	4–3 (10)	**Pérez** (1–0)	Howell (0–1)	—	27,404	2–2
5	April 11	Dodgers	6–0	**Bradley** (1–0)	Kershaw (0–1)	—	37,636	3–2
6	April 12	Dodgers	4–7	Greinke (1–0)	**Collmenter** (0–2)	Peralta (2)	29,678	3–3
7	April 13	@ Padres	8–4	**De La Rosa** (2–0)	Cashner (0–2)	—	19,538	4–3
8	April 14	@ Padres	1–5	Despaigne (1–0)	**Hellickson** (0–2)	—	20,102	4–4
9	April 15	@ Padres	2–3	Benoit (3–0)	**Delgado** (0–1)	Kimbrel (3)	23,104	4–5
10	April 16	@ Giants	7–6 (12)	**Delgado** (1–1)	Romo (0–1)	—	41,545	5–5
11	April 17	@ Giants	9–0	**Collmenter** (1–2)	Peavy (0–2)	—	41,550	6–5
12	April 18	@ Giants	1–4	Heston (2–1)	**De La Rosa** (2–1)	Casilla (4)	41,756	6–6
13	April 19	@ Giants	5–1	**Hellickson** (1–2)	Hudson (0–2)	—	41,528	7–6
14	April 21	Rangers	1–7	Tolleson (1–0)	**Hudson** (0–1)	—	18,345	7–7
15	April 22	Rangers	8–5	**Bradley** (2–0)	Gallardo (2–2)	—	17,886	8–7
16	April 24	Pirates	1–4	Cole (3–0)	**Collmenter** (1–3)	Melancon (4)	24,427	8–8
17	April 25	Pirates	1–2	Watson (1–1)	**Reed** (0–1)	Melancon (5)	38,859	8–9
18	April 26	Pirates	0–8	Liriano (1–1)	**Hellickson** (1–3)	—	32,353	8–10
19	April 27	Rockies	4–5	Matzek (2–0)	**Anderson** (0–1)	Axford (3)	17,444	8–11
20	April 28	Rockies	12–5	**Chafin** (1–0)	Kendrick (1–3)	—	18,792	9–11
21	April 29	Rockies	9–1	**Collmenter** (2–3)	Lyles (2–2)	—	19,633	10–11

May: 13–15 (Home: 5–5; Away: 8–10)

#	Date	Opponent	Score	Win	Loss	Save	Attendance	Record
22	May 1	@ Dodgers	0–8	Frías (2–0)	**De La Rosa** (2–2)	—	50,164	10–12
23	May 2	@ Dodgers	4–6	Nicasio (1–1)	**Marshall** (0–1)	Hatcher (2)	43,617	10–13
24	May 3	@ Dodgers	0–1 (13)	Howell (1–1)	**Marshall** (0–2)	—	48,136	10–14
—	May 4	@ Rockies	**Postponed (rain)** (Makeup date Sept 1)					
—	May 5	@ Rockies	**Postponed (rain)** (Rescheduled as a doubleheader on May 6)					
25	May 6	@ Rockies	13–7	**Collmenter** (3–3)	Matzek (2–1)	—	not given	11–14
26	May 6	@ Rockies	5–1	**Ray** (1–0)	Lyles (2–3)	—	22,621	12–14
27	May 7	Padres	11–0	**De La Rosa** (3–2)	Despaigne (2–1)	—	16,929	13–14
28	May 8	Padres	5–6	Shields (4–0)	**Burgos** (0–1)	Kimbrel (9)	28,677	13–15
29	May 9	Padres	4–6 (12)	Quackenbush (1–0)	**Delgado** (1–2)	—	27,340	13–16
30	May 10	Padres	2–1	**Ramírez** (1–0)	Cashner (1–6)	**Reed** (2)	24,881	14–16
31	May 11	Nationals	1–11	Scherzer (3–3)	**Collmenter** (3–4)	—	16,406	14–17
32	May 12	Nationals	14–6	**De La Rosa** (4–2)	Strasburg (2–4)	—	19,053	15–17
33	May 13	Nationals	6–9	Barrett (3–0)	**Reed** (0–2)	Storen (10)	19,026	15–18
34	May 15	@ Phillies	3–4	Araújo (1–0)	**Pérez** (1–1)	García (1)	21,383	15–19
35	May 16	@ Phillies	5–7	Williams (3–3)	**Bradley** (2–1)	Papelbon (9)	33,649	15–20
36	May 17	@ Phillies	0–6	O'Sullivan (1–2)	**Collmenter** (3–5)	—	22,123	15–21
37	May 18	@ Marlins	3–2 (13)	**Reed** (1–2)	Cishek (1–4)	**Burgos** (1)	17,526	16–21
38	May 19	@ Marlins	4–2	**Hudson** (1–1)	Dunn (0–3)	**Burgos** (2)	16,034	17–21
39	May 20	@ Marlins	6–1	**Anderson** (1–1)	Phelps (2–1)	—	17,158	18–21
40	May 21	@ Marlins	7–6	**Chafin** (2–0)	Dyson (2–1)	**Ziegler** (1)	20,692	19–21
41	May 22	Cubs	5–4 (13)	**Delgado** (2–2)	Rosscup (1–1)	—	34,498	20–21
42	May 23	Cubs	6–9	Motte (2–1)	**Burgos** (0–2)	Strop (1)	30,502	20–22
43	May 24	Cubs	4–3	**Hellickson** (2–3)	Hammel (3–2)	**Ziegler** (2)	39,660	21–22
44	May 25	@ Cardinals	2–3	Rosenthal (1–0)	**Ramírez** (1–1)	—	42,853	21–23
45	May 26	@ Cardinals	4–6	García (1–1)	**Bradley** (2–2)	Maness (3)	41,107	21–24
46	May 27	@ Cardinals	3–4	Maness (1–0)	**Ziegler** (0–1)	—	43,715	21–25
47	May 29	@ Brewers	7–5	**Reed** (2–2)	Broxton (1–2)	**Ziegler** (3)	34,276	22–25
48	May 30	@ Brewers	7–3	**Hellickson** (3–3)	Lohse (3–6)	**Delgado** (1)	39,552	23–25
49	May 31	@ Brewers	7–6 (17)	Garza (3–7)	**Nuño** (0–1)	—	32,460	23–26

June: 14–14 (Home: 8–6; Away: 6–8 )

#	Date	Opponent	Score	Win	Loss	Save	Attendance	Record
50	June 1	Braves	1–8	Wood (4–2)	**Bradley** (2–3)	—	18,258	23–27
51	June 2	Braves	7–6	**Chafin** (3–0)	Cunniff (2–1)	**Ziegler** (4)	17,101	24–27
52	June 3	Braves	9–8	**Chafin** (4–0)	Johnson (1–3)	**Ziegler** (5)	17,717	25–27
53	June 4	Mets	2–6	Harvey (6–3)	**Leone** (0–5)	Familia (16)	18,954	25–28
54	June 5	Mets	7–2	**Hellickson** (4–3)	Niese (3–6)	—	24,332	26–28
55	June 6	Mets	2–1	**Delgado** (3–2)	Colón (8–4)	**Ziegler** (6)	30,265	27–28
56	June 7	Mets	3–6	deGrom (7–4)	**Collmenter** (3–6)	Familia (17)	31,575	27–29
57	June 8	@ Dodgers	3–9	Bolsinger (4–1)	**De La Rosa** (4–3)	—	42,167	27–30
58	June 9	@ Dodgers	1–3	Liberatore (2–1)	**Ray** (1–1)	Jansen (7)	37,738	27–31
59	June 10	@ Dodgers	6–7	Jansen (1–0)	**Hudson** (1–2)	—	47,174	27–32
60	June 12	@ Giants	1–0	**Anderson** (2–1)	Bumgarner (7–3)	**Ziegler** (7)	41,952	28–32
61	June 13	@ Giants	4–2	**Webster** (1–0)	Vogelsong (4–5)	**Ziegler** (8)	42,006	29–32
62	June 14	@ Giants	4–0	**De La Rosa** (5–3)	Heston (6–5)	**Hudson** (1)	41,310	30–32
63	June 15	@ Angels	7–3	**Ray** (2–1)	Weaver (4–7)	**Reed** (3)	35,193	31–32
64	June 16	@ Angels	1–4	Richards (7–4)	**Hellickson** (4–4)	Street (20)	40,099	31–33
65	June 17	Angels	3–2	**Anderson** (3–1)	Santiago (4–4)	**Ziegler** (9)	28,481	32–33
66	June 18	Angels	1–7	Wilson (5–5)	**Webster** (1–1)	—	28,942	32–34
67	June 19	Padres	4–2	**De La Rosa** (6–3)	Shields (7–1)	**Ziegler** (10)	27,394	33–34
68	June 20	Padres	1–8	Ross (4–7)	**Ray** (2–2)	—	33,649	33–35
69	June 21	Padres	7–2	**Hellickson** (5–4)	Cashner (2–9)	**Chafin** (1)	35,590	34–35
70	June 23	@ Rockies	5–10	Kendrick (3–9)	**Anderson** (3–2)	—	30,079	34–36
71	June 24	@ Rockies	8–7	**Hudson** (2–2)	Axford (1–1)	**Ziegler** (11)	30,367	35–36
72	June 25	@ Rockies	4–6	Miller (1–0)	**Hudson** (2–3)	Axford (13)	30,568	35–37
73	June 26	@ Padres	2–4	Ross (5–7)	**Ray** (2–3)	Kimbrel (19)	30,317	35–38
74	June 27	@ Padres	2–7	Cashner (3–9)	**Hellickson** (5–5)	—	40,717	35–39
75	June 28	@ Padres	6–4	**Anderson** (4–2)	Despaigne (3–6)	**Ziegler** (12)	32,223	36–39
76	June 29	Dodgers	10–6	**Burgos** (1–2)	Báez (1–1)	—	24,215	37–39
77	June 30	Dodgers	4–6 (10)	Peralta (2–1)	**Hernandez** (0–1)	Jansen (12)	22,404	37–40

July: 13–11 (Home: 7–8; Away: 6–3 )

#	Date	Opponent	Score	Win	Loss	Save	Attendance	Record
78	July 1	Dodgers	3–4	Anderson (5–4)	**Ray** (2–4)	Jansen (13)	20,277	37–41
79	July 2	Rockies	8–1	**Hellickson** (6–5)	Rusin (3–3)	—	16,861	38–41
80	July 3	Rockies	4–3 (10)	**Chafin** (5–0)	Flande (0–1)	—	22,449	39–41
81	July 4	Rockies	7–3	**Corbin** (1–0)	Hale (2–4)	—	42,113	40–41
82	July 5	Rockies	4–6	de la Rosa (6–3)	**De La Rosa** (6–4)	Axford (14)	22,996	40–42
83	July 7	@ Rangers	4–2	**Ray** (3–4)	Gallardo (7–7)	**Ziegler** (13)	30,995	41–42
84	July 8	@ Rangers	7–4	**Delgado** (4–2)	Harrison (0–1)	**Ziegler** (14)	27,390	42–42
85	July 10	@ Mets	2–4	Syndergaard (4–4)	**Anderson** (4–3)	Familia (25)	28,243	42–43
86	July 11	@ Mets	2–4	Harvey (8–6)	**Corbin** (1–1)	Familia (26)	36,038	42–44
87	July 12	@ Mets	3–5	Niese (5–8)	**De La Rosa** (6–5)	Familia (27)	28,259	42–45
–	July 14	86th All-Star Game	National League vs. American League (Great American Ball Park, Cincinnati)					
88	July 17	Giants	5–6 (12)	Vogelsong (7–6)	**Delgado** (4–3)	—	26,922	42–46
89	July 18	Giants	4–8	Peavy (1–4)	**Anderson** (4–4)	Romo (1)	37,609	42–47
90	July 19	Giants	1–2	Bumgarner (10–5)	**Corbin** (1–2)	Casilla (24)	27,173	42–48
91	July 20	Marlins	3–1	**De La Rosa** (7–5)	Phelps (4–6)	**Ziegler** (15)	17,668	43–48
92	July 21	Marlins	0–3	Latos (4–6)	**Hellickson** (6–6)	Ramos (15)	16,983	43–49
93	July 22	Marlins	3–5	Fernández (3–0)	**Ray** (3–5)	Ramos (16)	15,857	43–50
94	July 23	Brewers	8–3	**Godley** (1–0)	Fiers (5–8)	—	18,011	44–50
95	July 24	Brewers	1–2	Nelson (8–9)	**Corbin** (1–3)	Rodríguez (22)	29,956	44–51
96	July 25	Brewers	2–0	**De La Rosa** (8–5)	Jungmann (5–2)	**Ziegler** (16)	34,957	45–51
97	July 26	Brewers	3–0	**Hellickson** (7–6)	Garza (5–11)	**Ziegler** (17)	24,216	46–51
98	July 27	@ Mariners	4–3 (10)	**Pérez** (2–1)	Smith (1–4)	**Chafin** (2)	19,532	47–51
99	July 28	@ Mariners	8–4	**Godley** (2–0)	Iwakuma (2–2)	—	25,106	48–51
100	July 29	@ Mariners	8–2	**Corbin** (2–3)	Hernández (12–6)	—	32,502	49–51
101	July 31	@ Astros	6–4 (10)	**Hudson** (3–3)	Neshek (3–2)	**Ziegler** (18)	34,720	50–51

August: 13–17 (Home: 5–8; Away: 8–9 )

#	Date	Opponent	Score	Win	Loss	Save	Attendance	Record
102	August 1	@ Astros	2–9	Keuchel (13–5)	**Hellickson** (7–7)	—	36,602	50–52
103	August 2	@ Astros	1–4	McHugh (13–5)	**Ray** (3–6)	Gregerson (22)	33,871	50–53
104	August 3	@ Nationals	6–4	**Godley** (3–0)	Fister (4–7)	**Ziegler** (19)	30,888	51–53
105	August 4	@ Nationals	4–5	Storen (2–0)	**Hernandez** (0–2)	Papelbon (19)	26,112	51–54
106	August 5	@ Nationals	11–4	**De La Rosa** (9–5)	Barrett (3–3)	—	37,572	52–54
107	August 6	@ Nationals	3–8	Ross (3–3)	**Hellickson** (7–8)	—	32,838	52–55
108	August 7	Reds	2–0	**Anderson** (5–4)	Iglesias (2–4)	**Ziegler** (20)	26,836	53–55
109	August 8	Reds	1–4	Sampson (1–1)	**Ray** (3–7)	Chapman (24)	40,512	53–56
110	August 9	Reds	4–3 (10)	**Collmenter** (4–6)	Mattheus (1–3)	—	28,116	54–56
111	August 10	Phillies	13–3	**De La Rosa** (10–5)	Harang (5–13)	—	16,495	55–56
112	August 11	Phillies	13–1	**Hellickson** (8–8)	Buchanan (2–7)	—	19,836	56–56
113	August 12	Phillies	6–7	Nola (3–1)	**Anderson** (5–5)	Giles (7)	18,047	56–57
114	August 14	@ Braves	2–3	Teherán (8–6)	**Ray** (3–8)	Vizcaíno (3)	31,917	56–58
115	August 15	@ Braves	8–4	**Corbin** (3–3)	Foltynewicz (4–4)	—	29,624	57–58
116	August 16	@ Braves	1–2 (10)	Aardsma (1–1)	**Hernandez** (0–3)	—	20,840	57–59
117	August 17	@ Pirates	4–1	**Hellickson** (9–8)	Cole (14–7)	**Ziegler** (21)	27,365	58–59
118	August 18	@ Pirates	8–9 (15)	Blanton (5–2)	**Hessler** (0–1)	—	24,975	58–60
119	August 19	@ Pirates	1–4	Happ (5–7)	**Ray** (3–9)	Melancon (38)	32,088	58–61
120	August 20	@ Reds	5–4	**Hernandez** (1–3)	Badenhop (1–3)	**Ziegler** (22)	22,063	59–61
121	August 21	@ Reds	6–3	**De La Rosa** (11–5)	Holmberg (1–3)	**Ziegler** (23)	26,757	60–61
122	August 22	@ Reds	11–7	**Godley** (4–0)	DeSclafani (7–9)	**Hudson** (2)	36,216	61–61
123	August 23	@ Reds	4–0	**Anderson** (6–5)	Iglesias (3–5)	—	27,656	62–61
124	August 24	Cardinals	3–5	Lynn (10–8)	**Chacín** (0–1)	Rosenthal (39)	19,892	62–62
125	August 25	Cardinals	1–9	García (6–4)	**Ray** (3–10)	—	18,720	62–63
126	August 26	Cardinals	1–3	Lackey (11–8)	**Hernandez** (1–4)	Rosenthal (40)	17,572	62–64
127	August 27	Cardinals	3–5	Martínez (13–6)	**De La Rosa** (11–6)	Rosenthal (41)	22,036	62–65
128	August 28	Athletics	6–4	**Delgado** (5–3)	Gray (12–6)	**Ziegler** (24)	30,059	63–65
129	August 29	Athletics	2–3	Rodriguez (4–1)	**Chafin** (5–1)	Pomeranz (3)	35,990	63–66
130	August 30	Athletics	4–7 (11)	Venditte (1–2)	**Ziegler** (0–2)	—	29,576	63–67
131	August 31	@ Rockies	4–5	Castro (2–0)	**Ziegler** (0–3)	—	21,386	63–68

September: 14–13 (Home: 6–5; Away: 8–8 )

#	Date	Opponent	Score	Win	Loss	Save	Attendance	Record
132	September 1	@ Rockies	6–4	**Corbin** (4–3)	Castro (0–1)	**Hudson** (3)	21,550	64–68
133	September 1	@ Rockies	5–3	**De La Rosa** (12–6)	Oberg (3–4)	**Collmenter** (1)	20,411	65–68
134	September 2	@ Rockies	4–9	Brown (1–2)	**Delgado** (5–4)	Miller (1)	20,574	65–69
135	September 4	@ Cubs	5–14	Lester (9–10)	**Godley** (4–1)	—	36,132	65–70
136	September 5	@ Cubs	0–2	Arrieta (18–6)	**Ray** (3–11)	Rondón (26)	40,690	65–71
137	September 6	@ Cubs	4–6	Grimm (3–4)	**De La Rosa** (12–7)	—	41,183	65–72
138	September 7	Giants	6–1	**Corbin** (5–3)	Leake (9–8)	—	28,078	66–72
139	September 8	Giants	2–6	Hudson (7–8)	**Anderson** (6–6)	—	18,683	66–73
140	September 9	Giants	2–1	**Godley** (5–1)	Heston (11–10)	**Ziegler** (25)	20,576	67–73
141	September 11	Dodgers	12–4	**Ray** (4–11)	Wood (10–10)	—	35,615	68–73
142	September 12	Dodgers	5–9	Howell (6–1)	**De La Rosa** (12–8)	—	42,517	68–74
143	September 13	Dodgers	3–4	Greinke (17–3)	**Corbin** (5–4)	—	36,501	68–75
144	September 14	Padres	3–10	Shields (12–6)	**Hellickson** (9–9)	—	15,951	68–76
145	September 15	Padres	6–4	**Delgado** (6–4)	Norris (3–11)	**Ziegler** (26)	17,531	69–76
146	September 16	Padres	3–4	Cashner (6–15)	**Ray** (4–12)	Kimbrel (37)	18,767	69–77
147	September 18	@ Giants	2–0	**De La Rosa** (13–8)	Bumgarner (18–8)	**Ziegler** (27)	41,346	70–77
148	September 19	@ Giants	6–0	**Corbin** (6–4)	Leake (10–9)	—	41,206	71–77
149	September 20	@ Giants	1–5	Hudson (8–8)	**Hellickson** (9–10)	—	41,390	71–78
150	September 21	@ Dodgers	8–4	**Chacín** (1–1)	Anderson (9–9)	—	38,791	72–78
151	September 22	@ Dodgers	8–0	**Ray** (5–12)	Wood (11–11)	—	41,419	73–78
152	September 23	@ Dodgers	1–4	Hatcher (3–5)	**Hernandez** (1–5)	Jansen (33)	46,364	73–79
153	September 24	@ Dodgers	3–6	Kershaw (15–7)	**Corbin** (6–5)	Jansen (34)	38,234	73–80
154	September 25	@ Padres	6–3	**De La Rosa** (14–8)	Kelly (0–1)	**Ziegler** (28)	24,179	74–80
155	September 26	@ Padres	0–3	Erlin (1–1)	**Hellickson** (9–11)	Kimbrel (38)	32,186	74–81
156	September 27	@ Padres	4–2	**Chacín** (2–1)	Shields (13–7)	**Ziegler** (29)	27,115	75–81
157	September 29	Rockies	4–3 (11)	**Delgado** (7–4)	Brown (1–3)	—	21,526	76–81
158	September 30	Rockies	3–1	**Delgado** (8–4)	Bettis (8–6)	**Hudson** (4)	18,529	77–81

October: 2–2 (Home: 2–2; Away: 0–0 )

#	Date	Opponent	Score	Win	Loss	Save	Attendance	Record
159	October 1	Rockies	8–6	**Burgos** (2–2)	Miller (3–3)	**Bracho** (1)	20,826	78–81
160	October 2	Astros	5–21	Keuchel (20–8)	**De La Rosa** (14–9)	—	33,218	78–82
161	October 3	Astros	2–6	McHugh (19–7)	**Hellickson** (9–12)	—	37,687	78–83
162	October 4	Astros	5–3	**Hudson** (4–3)	Qualls (3–5)	**Ziegler** (30)	24,788	79–83

Legend: = Win = Loss = Postponement
Bold = Diamondbacks team member

== Roster ==
2015 Arizona Diamondbacks
Roster
Pitchers: 57 Chase Anderson; 61 Silvino Bracho; 25 Archie Bradley; 36 Enrique Burgos; 47 Jhoulys Chacín; 40 Andrew Chafin; 55 Josh Collmenter; 46 Patrick Corbin; 12 Rubby De La Rosa; 48 Randall Delgado; 52 Zack Godley; 58 Jeremy Hellickson; 30 David Hernandez; 56 Keith Hessler; 41 Daniel Hudson; 54 Dominic Leone; 50 Evan Marshall; 54 Vidal Nuño; 59 Óliver Pérez; 56 J. C. Ramírez; 38 Robbie Ray; 43 Addison Reed; 45 Matt Reynolds; 35 A. J. Schugel; 37 Matt Stites; 27 Allen Webster; 29 Brad Ziegler	Catchers: 7 Welington Castillo; 9 Tuffy Gosewisch; 23 Oscar Hernández; 18 Gerald Laird; 31 Jordan Pacheco; 8 Jarrod Saltalamacchia; Infielders: 13 Nick Ahmed; 62 Brandon Drury; 44 Paul Goldschmidt; 15 Phil Gosselin; 2 Aaron Hill; 19 Jake Lamb; 16 Chris Owings; 4 Cliff Pennington	Outfielders: 68 Socrates Brito; 26 Danny Dorn; 5 Ender Inciarte; 72 Peter O'Brien; 6 David Peralta; 11 A. J. Pollock; 4 Jamie Romak; 24 Yasmany Tomás; 15 Mark Trumbo	Manager: 3 Chip Hale; Coaches: 1 Mike Fetters (quality assurance); 17 Mark Grace (assistant hitting); 14 Andy Green (third base); 22 Mike Harkey (pitching); 39 Dave McKay (first base); 49 Ariel Prieto (assistant coach); 83 Mark Reed (bullpen catcher); 53 Glenn Sherlock (bench); 34 Mel Stottlemyre Jr. (bullpen); 10 Turner Ward (hitting)

== Statistics ==
Through October 4, 2015

=== Batting ===
Note: G = Games played; AB = At bats; R = Runs scored; H = Hits; 2B = Doubles; 3B = Triples; HR = Home runs; RBI = Runs batted in; BB = Base on balls; SO = Strikeouts; AVG = Batting average; SB = Stolen bases

Player	G	AB	R	H	2B	3B	HR	RBI	BB	SO	AVG	SB
Nick Ahmed, SS	134	421	49	95	17	6	9	34	29	81	.226	4
Chase Anderson, P	28	48	0	5	0	0	0	3	1	23	.104	0
Archie Bradley, P	8	14	0	2	0	0	0	0	0	7	.143	0
Socrates Brito, OF	18	33	5	10	3	1	0	1	1	7	.303	1
Welington Castillo, C	80	274	34	70	13	1	17	50	21	75	.255	0
Jhoulys Chacín, P	5	8	0	1	0	0	0	0	0	4	.125	0
Andrew Chafin, P	66	3	0	0	0	0	0	0	0	1	.000	0
Josh Collmenter, P	44	27	2	5	0	0	0	1	3	9	.185	0
Patrick Corbin, P	16	25	1	3	0	0	0	3	3	11	.120	0
Rubby De La Rosa, P	32	64	3	6	0	0	0	2	0	25	.094	0
Randall Delgado, P	64	1	0	0	0	0	0	0	0	1	.000	0
Danny Dorn, RF, 1B	23	30	0	5	1	0	0	3	2	10	.167	0
Brandon Drury, IF	20	56	3	12	3	0	2	8	2	8	.214	0
Zack Godley, P	9	9	0	1	0	0	0	0	0	6	.111	0
Paul Goldschmidt, 1B	159	567	103	182	38	2	33	110	118	151	.321	21
Tuffy Gosewisch, C	38	128	9	27	6	0	1	13	8	23	.211	2
Phil Gosselin, UT	24	66	17	20	5	1	3	13	7	11	.303	0
Jeremy Hellickson, P	29	41	3	9	0	0	0	7	2	14	.220	0
Oscar Hernández, C	18	31	4	5	1	0	0	1	3	15	.161	0
Keith Hessler, P	18	1	0	1	0	0	0	0	0	0	1.000	0
Aaron Hill, 3B, 2B	116	313	32	72	18	0	6	39	31	54	.230	7
Daniel Hudson, P	64	1	0	0	0	0	0	0	0	1	.000	0
Ender Inciarte, OF	132	524	73	159	27	5	6	45	26	58	.303	21
Gerald Laird, C	1	2	0	0	0	0	0	0	0	0	.000	0
Jake Lamb, 3B	107	350	38	92	15	5	6	34	36	97	.263	3
Vidal Nuño, P	3	5	0	0	0	0	0	0	0	0	.000	0
Peter O'Brien, LF	8	10	1	4	1	0	1	3	2	5	.400	0
Chris Owings, 2B	147	515	59	117	27	5	4	43	26	144	.227	16
Jordan Pacheco, C	29	66	8	16	0	0	2	8	9	14	.242	1
Cliff Pennington, SS, 2B, 3B, LF	72	135	15	32	3	0	1	10	16	29	.237	3
David Peralta, LF	149	462	61	144	26	10	17	78	44	107	.312	9
A. J. Pollock, CF	157	609	111	192	39	6	20	76	53	89	.315	39
Robbie Ray, P	23	31	0	3	1	0	0	0	0	14	.097	0
Addison Reed, P	38	2	0	0	0	0	0	0	0	0	.000	0
Jamie Romak, LF	12	15	2	5	2	0	0	1	1	6	.333	0
Jarrod Saltalamacchia, C	70	171	23	43	14	0	8	23	19	57	.251	0
Yasmany Tomás, 3B, RF	118	406	40	111	19	3	9	48	17	110	.273	5
Mark Trumbo, RF	46	174	23	45	10	3	9	23	10	39	.259	0
Allen Webster, P	9	11	1	0	0	0	0	0	0	6	.000	0
Team totals	162	5649	720	1494	289	48	154	680	490	1312	.264	132

=== Pitching ===
Note: W = Wins; L = Losses; ERA = Earned run average; G = Games pitched; GS = Games started; SV = Saves; IP = Innings pitched; H = Hits allowed; R = Runs allowed; ER = Earned runs allowed; HR = Home runs allowed; BB = Walks allowed; K = Strikeouts

Player	W	L	ERA	G	GS	SV	IP	H	R	ER	HR	BB	K
Chase Anderson	6	6	4.30	27	27	0	152.2	158	75	73	18	40	111
Archie Bradley	2	3	5.80	8	8	0	35.2	36	23	23	3	22	23
Silvino Bracho	0	0	1.46	13	0	1	12.1	9	2	2	2	4	17
Enrigue Burgos	2	2	4.67	30	0	2	27.0	27	15	14	2	15	39
Jhoulys Chacín	2	1	3.38	5	4	0	26.2	24	11	10	4	10	21
Andrew Chafin	5	1	2.76	66	0	2	75.0	56	23	23	3	30	58
Josh Collmenter	4	6	3.79	44	12	1	121.0	129	53	51	18	24	63
Patrick Corbin	6	5	3.60	16	16	0	85.0	91	34	34	9	17	78
Rubby De La Rosa	14	9	4.67	32	32	0	188.2	193	100	98	32	63	150
Randall Delgado	8	4	3.25	64	1	1	72.0	63	28	26	7	33	73
Zack Godley	5	1	3.19	9	6	0	36.2	29	13	13	4	17	34
Jeremy Hellickson	9	12	4.62	27	27	0	146.0	151	77	75	22	43	121
David Hernandez	1	5	4.28	40	0	0	33.2	33	17	16	6	11	33
Keith Hessler	0	1	8.03	18	0	0	12.1	16	11	11	4	4	12
Daniel Hudson	4	3	3.86	64	1	4	67.2	64	34	29	7	25	71
Dominic Leone	0	1	14.73	3	0	0	3.2	8	6	6	1	0	2
Evan Marshall	0	2	6.08	13	0	0	13.1	20	9	9	3	5	7
Vidal Nuño	0	1	1.88	3	0	0	14.1	10	3	3	1	5	19
Óliver Pérez	2	1	3.10	48	0	0	29.0	25	12	10	2	11	37
J. C. Ramírez	1	1	4.11	12	0	0	15.1	15	7	7	1	4	11
Robbie Ray	5	12	3.52	23	23	0	127.2	121	55	50	9	49	119
Addison Reed	2	2	4.20	38	0	3	40.2	47	19	19	2	14	34
Matt Reynolds	0	0	4.61	18	0	0	13.2	14	7	7	6	7	18
A. J. Schugel	0	0	5.00	5	0	0	9.0	17	5	5	2	5	5
Matt Stites	0	0	12.46	11	0	0	8.2	14	12	12	1	5	6
Allen Webster	1	1	5.81	9	5	0	31.0	32	22	20	10	20	17
Brad Ziegler	0	3	1.85	66	0	30	68.0	48	15	14	3	17	36
Team totals	79	83	4.04	162	162	44	1466.2	1450	713	659	182	500	1215

== Farm system ==
Level	Team	League	Manager
AAA	Reno Aces	Pacific Coast League	Phil Nevin
AA	Mobile BayBears	Southern League	Robby Hammock
A-Advanced	Visalia Rawhide	California League	J. R. House
A	Kane County Cougars	Midwest League	Mark Grudzielanek
A-Short Season	Hillsboro Hops	Northwest League	Shelley Duncan
Rookie	Missoula Osprey	Pioneer League	Joe Mather
Rookie	AZL Diamondbacks	Arizona League	
Rookie	DSL Diamondbacks	Dominican Summer League	Juan Ballara

League Champions: Hillsboro, Missoula
