= Arizona Daily Wildcat =

Student newspaper serving the University of Arizona

- Type: Student newspaper
- Format: Tabloid
- Owner: Arizona Student Media
- Founded: 1899
- Headquarters: Tucson, AZ, US
- OCLC number: 55753554
- Website: wildcat.arizona.edu

The Arizona Daily Wildcat is a student newspaper serving the University of Arizona. It was founded in 1899 as the Sage Green and Silver. Previous names include Arizona Weekly Life, University Life, Arizona Life and Arizona Wildcat. Its distribution is within the university and the Tucson, Arizona metropolitan area. It has a distribution of 20,000. Its website dailywildcat.com is updated regularly during the spring and fall semesters, while the print version is distributed Wednesday. During the summer months, it is published weekly as the Arizona Summer Wildcat. The Arizona Daily Wildcat was named Best College Newspaper by Princeton Review's THE BEST 361 COLLEGES, 2006 EDITION.

== Awards ==
2010 Associated Collegiate Press Online Pacemaker award winner.
2010 Associated Collegiate Press Pacemaker finalist.
2010 Society of Professional Journalists Mark of Excellence Award National Finalist for online sports reporting at a four-year college or university.
2010 College Media Advisers Apple Award winner for best four-year broadsheet newspaper.
2015 Associated Collegiate Press 2015 National College Media Convention Best of Show

== Controversy ==
The Tuesday October 16, 2012 issue featured a four-panel cartoon by cartoonist D. C. Parsons, deemed offensive by some 8,000 signatories to a petition to have the Cartoonist and Editor-in-Chief and Copy-Editor fired. The editor-in-chief did not step down despite the number of signatories asking for her resignation; however, the cartoonist was promptly fired after the publication.

Father: Ya know son...

If you ever tell me you're gay... I will shoot you with my shotgun, roll you up in a carpet and throw you off of a bridge...

Son: Well I guess that's what you call a "Fruit Roll Up!"

Father and Son: Ahh Ha ha ha Ha ha... bwah Ha Ha ha Ha ha haa!!

The paper did issue an apology for the matter.

== The May Day mystery ==
The May Day mystery is a series of cryptic advertisements taken out annually on May 1 (May Day) in the Arizona Daily Wildcat since 1981. The ads are described as a "mess of equations, historical figures, artwork and symbols", and are signed with a "smiley face" figure.

The first known ad appeared on May 1, 1981, featuring the quote "Long live Chairman Mao" written in simplified Chinese. Over the years, the ads grew in complexity. The ads usually appear on the most expensive advertising areas of the newspaper. They share a theme of revolution and social unrest, and featured about 14 languages including forms of Chinese, Afrikaans and Hebrew. In 1997, UA alumni and web designer Bryan Hance started a website to document the ads. Hance claimed he has since been contacted by an organization known as the "Orphanage" who provided him with more clues and cryptic messages. In 1998, following an ad featuring many cryptic messages in Hebrew, a group of students accused the ads of anti-Semitism and demanded to know the source of the ads.

The ads were, for several years, placed by Robert Truman Hungerford, a Tucson-based lawyer and a UA alumni. He is a "self-described anti-social hermit" with an interest in philosophy, theology, cryptography, languages and medicine. In a 2003 interview, Hungerford claimed to be the legal counsel for an organization who placed the ads, and refused to name the organization. Hungerford also claimed to be a member of the "Orphanage".

== Notable alumni ==
Daily Wildcat alumni have been successful in fields other than journalism, from higher education to thoroughbred race horse training. Alumni in the journalism and media fields include:

- Dan Hicks, NBC sportscaster
- Kate Longworth, reporter for Fox Sports Arizona'
- Lynne Olson (Freedom's Daughters, Citizens of London)
- Dorothy Parvaz, Al Jazeera reporter
- Merl Reagle, syndicated crossword puzzle creator
- Mort Rosenblum, author and foreign correspondent
- Frank Sotomayor, retired journalist with the LA Times and winner of the 1984 Pulitzer Prize
- Bill Walsh, The Washington Post copy chief, creator of theslot.com and author of books on copyediting
