= Chase Anderson =

American baseball player (born 1987)

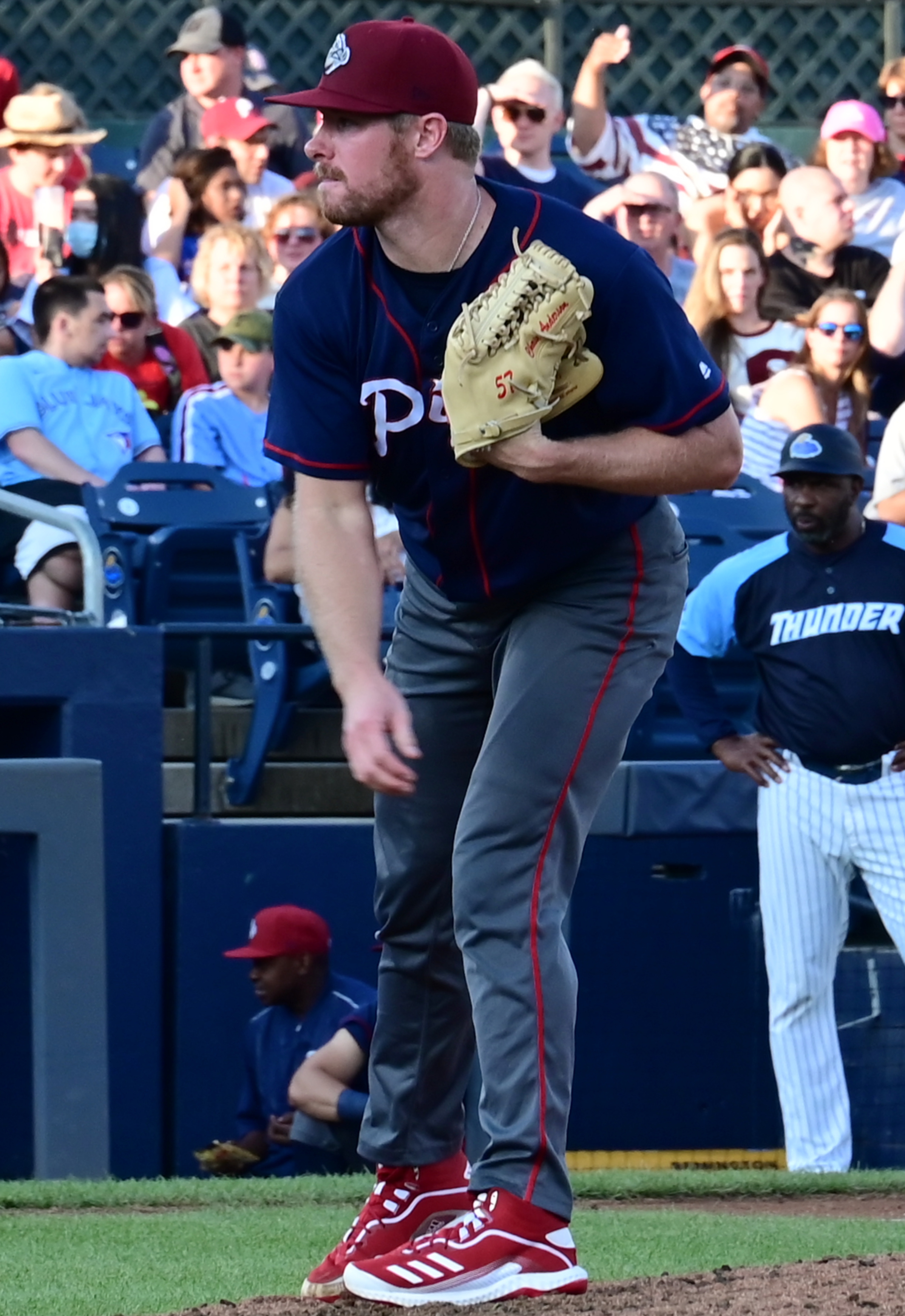
- Anderson with the Lehigh Valley IronPigs in 2021
- Pitcher
- Born: November 30, 1987 (age 38); Wichita Falls, Texas, U.S.
- Batted: Right Threw: Right

MLB debut
- May 11, 2014, for the Arizona Diamondbacks

Last MLB appearance
- September 11, 2024, for the Texas Rangers

MLB statistics
- Win–loss record: 59–58
- Earned run average: 4.41
- Strikeouts: 923
- Stats at Baseball Reference

Teams
- Arizona Diamondbacks (2014–2015); Milwaukee Brewers (2016–2019); Toronto Blue Jays (2020); Philadelphia Phillies (2021); Cincinnati Reds (2022); Tampa Bay Rays (2023); Colorado Rockies (2023); Boston Red Sox (2024); Texas Rangers (2024)

Robert Chase Anderson (born November 30, 1987) is an American former professional baseball pitcher. He played in Major League Baseball (MLB) for the Arizona Diamondbacks, Milwaukee Brewers, Toronto Blue Jays, Philadelphia Phillies, Cincinnati Reds, Tampa Bay Rays, Colorado Rockies, Boston Red Sox, and Texas Rangers.

Anderson was born in Wichita Falls, Texas, and helped his father with the family business following his parents' divorce. He was a standout pitcher at S. H. Rider High School, pitching three no-hitters as a senior in 2006 and setting a school record for career strikeouts, but his slender build limited attention from college baseball recruiters. He spent two seasons with North Central Texas College before transferring to the University of Oklahoma for the 2009 season. The Diamondbacks selected Anderson in the ninth round of the 2009 MLB draft. He spent the next several years rising through the team's farm system, suffering a setback in 2011 when an elbow injury caused him to miss nearly the entire season. Anderson made his major league debut for the Diamondbacks in 2014.

During the 2016 offseason, Anderson was part of a major five-player trade between the Diamondbacks and Brewers. His performance continued to improve, setting career highs in wins in 2017 and innings pitched in 2018. Going into 2020, the Brewers traded Anderson to the Toronto Blue Jays, where his performance suffered amid a shortened season. He spent most of the 2021 season on a one-year contract for the Phillies, but closed out the year in the Texas Rangers minor league system.

== Early life ==
Anderson was born on November 30, 1987, in Wichita Falls, Texas. His parents, Michelle and Robert Anderson, divorced when their son was 12 years old. Anderson went to live with his father, helping with the family lawn care and firewood businesses. In their free time, Anderson and his father would play catch in their backyard, which sparked Anderson's love for baseball. Anderson also wanted to play gridiron football, but his mother was afraid that he would suffer an injury that would hinder his baseball career.

While attending S. H. Rider High School in Wichita Falls, Anderson caught the attention of coach Kerry Hargrove, who purposely selected Anderson to pitch on the hottest games of the year. Hargrove told KAUZ-TV in 2018, "He was such a hard worker, mowed yards in his high school days to earn extra money. So we would pitch him on days when it was going to be 104, 105 degrees, and we knew we had an advantage because we knew he had the stamina to last on those type of days". In his senior season with Rider, Anderson pitched three no-hitters, including one against division rivals Wichita Falls High School. He finished his senior season in 2006 with a 12–1 win–loss record and was named to the Texas All-State team as both a pitcher and a shortstop. Anderson also set a school record with 291 career strikeouts.

== College career ==
Anderson graduated from Rider in 2006. As he was smaller than many of his peers, standing at 5 ft 11 in (1.80 m) and weighing 140 pounds (64 kg), he did not receive many recruitment offers from college baseball teams. Instead, he committed to attend North Central Texas College. In the 2006–07 National Junior College Athletic Association (NJCAA) season, Anderson led North Central Texas pitchers in strikeouts, with 67 in 61 1/3 innings pitched. He spent two seasons there before transferring to the University of Oklahoma. Anderson became a critical member of the Oklahoma Sooners' bullpen, with a crucial long reliever performance against Wichita State in the 2009 NCAA regional playoffs. Leading the Oklahoma pitching rotation with 26 appearances in 2009, Anderson posted a 3–1 record with a 4.97 ERA, striking out 60 batters in 50 2/3 innings.

== Professional career ==
=== Draft and minor leagues ===
The Arizona Diamondbacks of Major League Baseball (MLB) drafted Anderson in the ninth round, with the 276th overall selection of the 2009 Major League Baseball draft. He spent the season with the rookie–level Missoula Osprey of the Pioneer League, helping pitch the team reach the 2009 playoffs. The Osprey used Anderson as both a starting pitcher and reliever, and he went 3–1 for the season with a 2.38 earned run average (ERA) and 49 strikeouts in 45 1/3 innings.

Anderson began the 2010 season with the Single–A South Bend Silver Hawks, with whom he was named the Midwest League Pitcher of the Week for the week ending May 9. The honor came after a seven-inning complete game shutout against the Dayton Dragons. He was soon promoted to the High–A Visalia Rawhide of the California League. He won Pitcher of the Week honors once again on June 7 after striking out 11 batters and allowing only one run against the Stockton Ports. Between the two teams, Anderson posted a 7–7 record for the season, with a 3.32 ERA and 114 strikeouts in 108 1/3 innings. Anderson began the 2011 season with the Rawhide as well but pitched in only three games before a flexor muscle strain in his right elbow ended his season.

Returning in 2012, Anderson was assigned to the Double–A Mobile BayBears. Anderson's father died shortly after spring training, and the pitcher decided to use the news to push himself harder, telling reporters, "I try to use things like obstacles in life as opportunities to grow, to get better, to learn something from." He led the Southern League with a 2.08 ERA in the early part of the season. In May, Anderson left a game against the Jackson Generals after only two innings and spent seven days on the disabled list. He went 5–4 for the season in 21 starts and posted a 2.86 ERA. He also recorded 97 strikeouts and helped take the BayBears to their second consecutive Southern League championship. That same year, Anderson played in the Arizona Fall League with the Salt River Rafters, going 3–1 with a 3.47 ERA and recording 26 strikeouts in 23 1/3 innings.

Anderson began the 2013 season with the Triple–A Reno Aces. Although he was placed on the disabled list twice with an injury to the right triceps, he appeared in 26 games, including 13 starts, and went 4–7 with a 5.73 ERA. He was moved back down to the BayBears in 2014, where he began the season strongly, going 4–2 with a 0.69 ERA in his first six starts.

=== Arizona Diamondbacks (2014–2015) ===
Anderson was recalled to the Diamondbacks on May 6, 2014, as pitcher Mike Bolsinger was optioned to Triple A. He was credited with the win in his major league debut on May 11, giving up only two hits and one run in 5 1/3 innings of a 5–1 victory over the Chicago White Sox. Anderson continued to dominate in the first part of the season, becoming the first pitcher since Jered Weaver to start his major league career with five consecutive wins. Sports journalists considered Anderson's consistent performance to be a bright spot amidst the Diamondbacks' disappointing 2014 season. Anderson finished his rookie season with a 9–7 record, a 4.01 ERA, and 105 strikeouts in 114 1/3 innings.

Going into the 2015 season, Anderson was named as part of a five-man starting rotation for the Diamondbacks that also consisted of Josh Collmenter, Jeremy Hellickson, Rubby De La Rosa, and Trevor Cahill. On June 13, Anderson pitched 6 1/3 hitless innings against the San Francisco Giants before giving up a hit to catcher Buster Posey. Although he posted a 2.82 ERA in his first 12-season starts, a lack of offensive performance from the Diamondbacks meant that he only took the win in three of those matches. Anderson struggled by the middle of the season, with his poor performance reaching its crest on July 18, when he was taken out of a game against the Giants in the fourth inning after allowing seven runs on 10 hits. This outing came after he had given up a cumulative 19 runs in his prior four starts. The following day, he was placed on the 15-day disabled list with inflammation in his right triceps. In August, Anderson spent a brief stint in the minor leagues before Hellickson was placed on the disabled list with a hamstring injury. Anderson posted a 6–6 record in 2016, with a 4.30 ERA and 111 strikeouts in 27 starts and 152 2/3 innings.

=== Milwaukee Brewers (2016–2019) ===
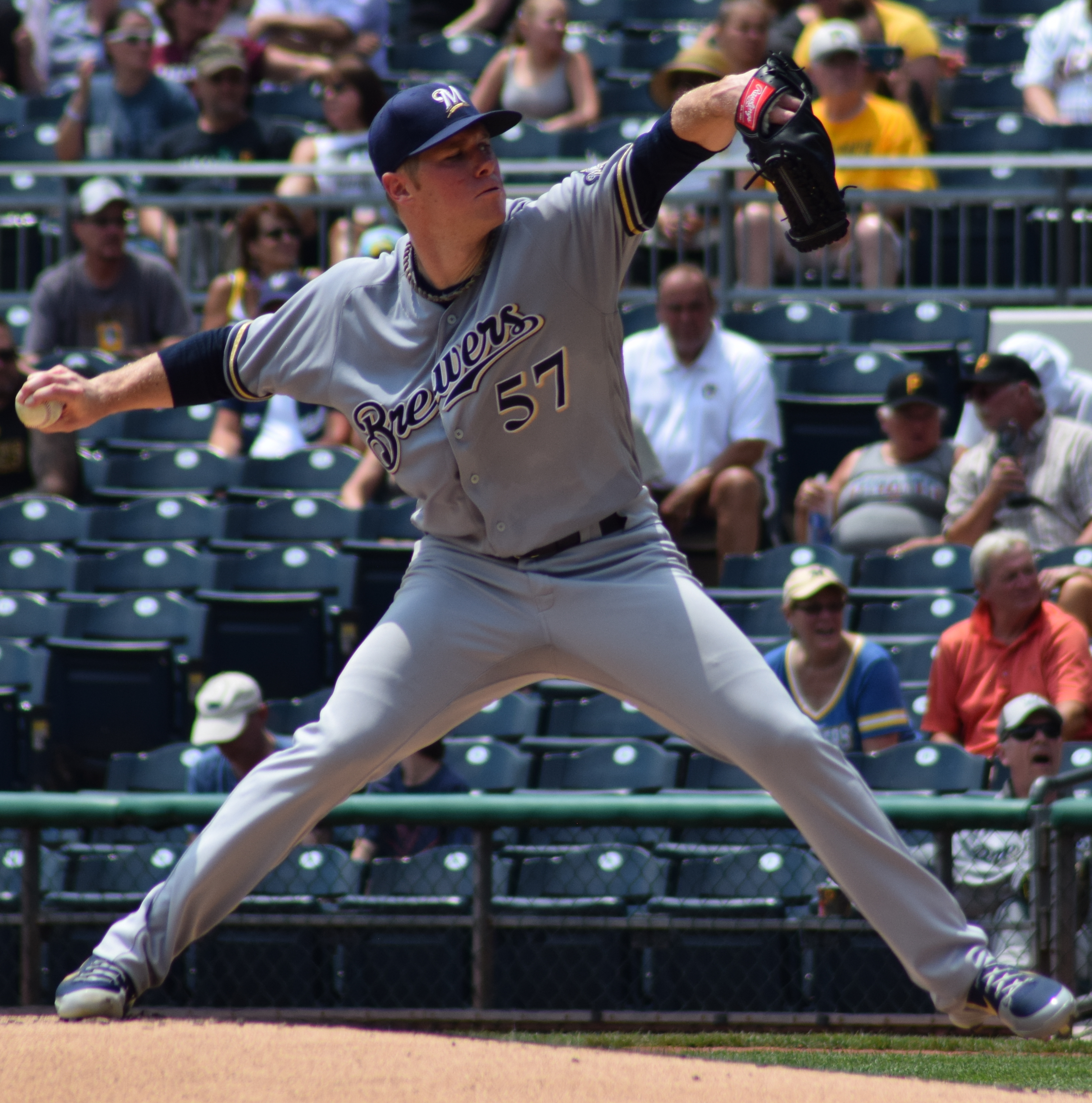
Anderson with the Milwaukee Brewers in 2018

On January 30, 2016, Anderson was traded to the Milwaukee Brewers alongside infielder Aaron Hill and shortstop prospect Isan Diaz in exchange for shortstop Jean Segura and pitching prospect Tyler Wagner. The Brewers also received cash considerations due to Hill's large contract. On May 17, 2016, Anderson pitched seven hitless innings against the Chicago Cubs before Ben Zobrist hit a double on the first pitch of the eighth inning. After solo home runs from Jason Heyward and Kris Bryant in the ninth, Anderson was taken out of the game with one out remaining, and Jeremy Jeffress got the save to preserve his win. In the middle of the season, Anderson struggled with both run control and longevity: between June 8 and July 24, he did not win a single game for the Brewers, and he routinely did not pitch through the end of the fifth inning. He improved towards the end of the season, cutting his ERA from 5.44 in the first half to 3.02 in the second half. Anderson made 30 starts and one relief appearance for the Brewers in 2016, posting a 9–11 record and a 4.39 ERA.

Anderson's contract went to arbitration during the offseason when he and the Brewers could not reach an agreement on his salary. Anderson lost the hearing and was paid $2.45 million for the 2017 season. On May 27, while playing against his old team, Anderson once again took a no-hitter bid into the eighth inning. His hitless streak was broken by a single from Diamondbacks batter Nick Ahmed, but the Brewers went on to win the game 6–1. On June 28, Anderson left a game against the Reds in the second inning after suddenly grabbing his left side. He was placed on the 10-day disabled list with an oblique strain, but was expected to miss closer to four to six weeks. At the time of the injury, Anderson was having the best season of his career, with a 2.89 ERA and 8.5 strikeouts per nine innings pitched (K/9). Following a series of rehab assignments with the Class A Wisconsin Timber Rattlers and the Triple-A Colorado Springs Sky Sox, Anderson returned to the rotation on August 20 for a game against the Colorado Rockies. Despite missing six weeks of the season due to injury, Anderson dominated in the 2017 season, going 12–4 with a 2.74 ERA, 133 strikeouts, and a 1.090 WHIP in 25 starts and 141 1/3 innings.

Following his strong performance in 2017, the Brewers signed Anderson to a two-year, $11.75 million contract on October 26, 2017. He also got the nod to start the Brewers' Opening Day game against the San Diego Padres on March 29, 2018. Anderson allowed one hit in six innings, but Jeffress was credited with the 2–1 win in extra innings. Early into the season, it was predicted that Anderson would become the Brewers' ace. In his first four starts, he held to a 2.82 ERA and managed to break the New York Mets' nine-game winning streak. However, he was unable to retain the momentum that he had built in 2017, as he went on to lead the National League (NL) with 30 home runs allowed. After allowing three runs in 3 2/3 innings on September 18, Anderson was removed from the Brewers' starting rotation, and he was left off of the postseason roster entirely. He pitched to a 9–8 record in 2018, with a 3.93 ERA and 128 strikeouts in 158 innings and 30 starts.

Following his lackluster 2018 performance, Anderson began the 2019 season in the Brewers' bullpen, where he went 1–0 with a 4.50 ERA in five appearances. After a series of injuries and disappointments befell the starting rotation, however, he was moved back into the role, where he went 7–4 with a 4.19 ERA in 27 appearances. Critical to his newfound success was the utilization of a cut fastball, which he used 14.5 percent of the time in 2019. FanGraphs ranked Anderson's cutter as the second-best in the MLB that year, behind that of Jeff Samardzija. Anderson's season ERA was 4.21 in 2019, with 124 strikeouts in 139 innings.

=== Toronto Blue Jays (2020) ===
On November 4, 2019, the Brewers traded Anderson to the Toronto Blue Jays in exchange for prospect Chad Spanberger. The previous season, the Jays had suffered a series of trades and injuries that had destabilized their starting rotation, and they were in search of a consistent veteran pitcher. Anderson struggled in the COVID-19 pandemic-shortened 2020 MLB season, posting a 1–2 record and a 7.22 ERA in only 10 appearances for the Blue Jays. His worst start of the season came on September 17, 2020, when Anderson gave up five home runs in one inning against the New York Yankees, three of which came from consecutive pitches against Brett Gardner, DJ LeMahieu, and Luke Voit. Anderson became a free agent after the season.

=== Philadelphia Phillies and Texas Rangers (2021) ===
On February 3, 2021, Anderson signed a one-year, $4 million deal with the Philadelphia Phillies, placing him in competition with prospect Spencer Howard, veteran Vince Velasquez, and other offseason acquisition Matt Moore for the fourth or fifth position in the Phillies' starting rotation. Moore and Anderson were named to the starting rotation at the beginning of the season following injuries to Howard and Velasquez. After Anderson had a disappointing performance in his first eight starts, with a 6.96 ERA and no outs recorded past the fifth inning, the Phillies moved him to the bullpen on May 21. Anderson missed the following two months of the season: at the start of June, he was placed on the COVID-19 injured list, and he spent the month of July on a minor league rehab assignment. On July 25, with starting pitcher Zach Eflin suffering knee tendinitis, Anderson was called back up from his rehab assignment to help the thinned-out pitching staff. Anderson made 14 appearances for the Phillies, including nine starts, and posted a 6.75 ERA in the process. When Eflin rejoined the rotation on August 26, Anderson was designated for assignment, drawing his release the following day.

Two days after being released from the Phillies, Anderson signed a minor league contract with the Texas Rangers, his hometown team. He was assigned to the Triple-A Round Rock Express. In five appearances there (three starts), Anderson went 0–1 with a 4.20 ERA and 14 strikeouts in 15 innings.

=== 2022 ===
On March 14, 2022, the Detroit Tigers signed Anderson to a minor-league contract with an invitation to spring training. On April 10, Anderson was released by the Tigers organization. On April 12, Anderson re-signed with Detroit on a new minor league contract. He opted out of his contract and became a free agent on July 16, 2022.

On July 25, 2022, Anderson signed a minor league contract with the Tampa Bay Rays organization and was assigned to the Triple-A Durham Bulls. He opted out of his contract and became a free agent on August 25.

On August 27, 2022, Anderson signed a minor league deal with the Cincinnati Reds. He was selected to the major league roster on August 29, and made his first start as a Red against the St. Louis Cardinals the same day. He pitched 1 1/3 innings, allowing five earned runs. He appeared in 9 games (7 starts) for the Reds down the stretch, posting a 2–4 record and 6.38 ERA with 23 strikeouts in 24.0 innings pitched.

=== 2023 ===
On February 18, 2023, Anderson re-signed with the Reds on a minor league contract, but did not receive an invite to major league Spring Training On March 7, Anderson was added to the big-league camp. He made 5 starts for the Triple-A Louisville Bats to start the year, posting a 2–1 record and 4.30 ERA with 19 strikeouts in 23.0 innings pitched.

On May 3, 2023, Anderson was traded to the Tampa Bay Rays in exchange for cash, and was subsequently selected to the active roster. That same day, he got the first save of his career against the Pittsburgh Pirates. In two appearances for Tampa Bay, Anderson logged 5.0 scoreless innings, allowing only 3 baserunners. He was designated for assignment on May 10, following the signing of Jake Diekman.

On May 12, 2023, Anderson was claimed off waivers by the Colorado Rockies. On June 24, in a game against the Los Angeles Angels, Anderson gave up home runs on three consecutive pitches, to Mike Trout, Brandon Drury, and Matt Thaiss, for the second time in his career, the only pitcher to have ever done so more than once. In 17 starts for Colorado, he logged a 1–6 record and 5.75 ERA with 62 strikeouts across 81 1/3 innings pitched. He became a free agent following the season.

=== 2024 ===
On February 19, 2024, Anderson signed a minor league contract with the Pittsburgh Pirates. The Pirates released him on March 22, after he failed to make the major-league roster. Two days later, he signed a one-year, $1.25 million major league contract with the Boston Red Sox. In 27 appearances (1 start) for Boston, he compiled a 4.85 ERA with 35 strikeouts and 3 saves across 52 innings pitched. On July 28, Anderson was designated for assignment by the Red Sox. He elected free agency, in lieu of an outright assignment to the minor leagues, on August 2.

On August 5, 2024, Anderson signed a minor league contract with the Texas Rangers organization. In 4 starts for the Triple–A Round Rock Express, he struggled to a 6.94 ERA with 12 strikeouts over 11 2/3 innings of work. On August 31, the Rangers selected Anderson's contract, adding him to their active roster. In 2 appearances for Texas, he allowed 7 runs on 9 hits with 7 strikeouts over 6 1/3 innings pitched. Anderson was designated for assignment by the Rangers on September 12. He cleared waivers and elected free agency on September 14.

== Pitcher profile ==
Early in his MLB career, Anderson gained a reputation as a dependable, consistent pitcher for the back of the starting rotation. This consistent pitching approach has caused Anderson trouble, as his propensity for throwing fastballs down the middle of the plate has led to too many home runs by opposing batters. Going into the 2019 season, Anderson found that his pitch delivery had been hindered by poor placement of his lower body, and he revamped his pitching mechanics to assert better control over the ball. Part of this process included watching videos of aces Max Scherzer and Nathan Eovaldi. Anderson noted the idiosyncrasies they took to ensure that they were properly aligned with home plate before each pitch.

As a prospect within the Diamondbacks organization, Anderson's changeup received attention from sports journalists. He was taught the pitch at age 13 by the head coach at Rider. For the first three seasons of his major league career, Anderson leaned heavily on a two-pitch repertoire consisting of the changeup and a four-seam fastball. In 2017, however, he decided to diversify his repertoire by adding a cut fastball and a curveball to increase his strike rate. As he developed his curveball further, Anderson stopped utilizing a sinker that had made up a critical piece of his early repertoire.

Anderson has cited fellow Texan pitchers Nolan Ryan and Josh Beckett as inspirations.

== Personal life ==
Anderson's father died in 2012 of a heart attack at the age of 58. Since then, Anderson has worn an outfit that belonged to his father while en route to every home start, and writes his father's initials in the dirt of the pitcher's mound before beginning play. He married his wife Anna in 2013. The following year, she gave up her job as a realtor in Dallas in order to follow her husband's baseball career. Chase and Anna's oldest son, Robert Hunter Anderson, was born in November 2016, and was named after Anderson's late father and his wife's maiden name. Their second child, Elliana, was born in March 2019.

Anderson is a Baptist. He became a Christian through the influence of his grandmother, Annette Anderson, with whom he attended both Baptist and United Methodist churches. He attends The Village Church in Dallas. Annette's battle with melanoma, as well as several cancer deaths in his wife's family, led Anderson to begin charity work with Cancer Knows No Borders. In 2017, Anderson worked with Cubs first baseman Anthony Rizzo to increase cancer awareness and raise money for medical programs in Wisconsin and Illinois.
