= Oscar Hernández (baseball) =

Venezuelan baseball player (born 1993)

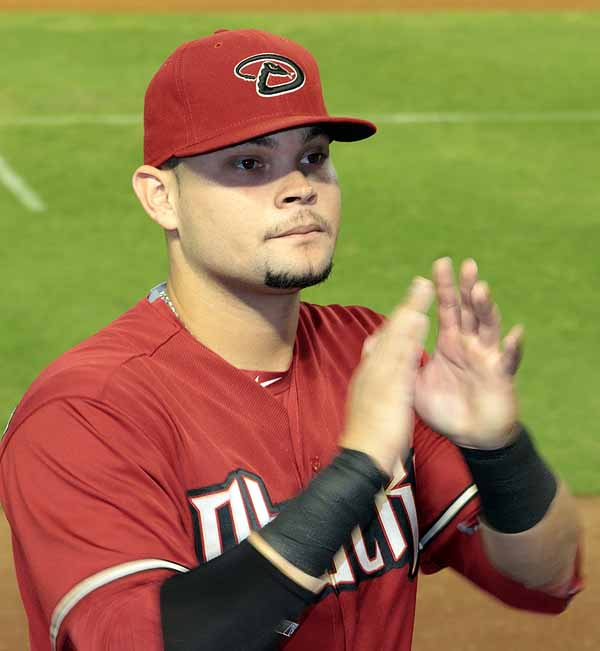
- Hernández with the Arizona Diamondbacks

York Revolution
- Catcher
- Born: July 9, 1993 (age 33); Punto Fijo, Venezuela
- Bats: Right Throws: Right

MLB debut
- July 12, 2015, for the Arizona Diamondbacks

MLB statistics (through 2020 season)
- Batting average: .196
- Home runs: 1
- Runs batted in: 2
- Stats at Baseball Reference

Teams
- Arizona Diamondbacks (2015–2016); Kansas City Royals (2020)

Oscar Eduardo Hernández Rios (born July 9, 1993) is a Venezuelan professional baseball catcher for the York Revolution of the Atlantic League of Professional Baseball. He has previously played in Major League Baseball (MLB) for the Arizona Diamondbacks and Kansas City Royals. Listed at 6 feet 1 inch (1.85 m) and 230 pounds (100 kg), he throws and bats right-handed.

== Career ==
=== Tampa Bay Rays ===
Hernández signed with the Tampa Bay Rays as an international free agent in 2009. He made his professional debut with the Venezuelan Summer League Rays in 2010. In 2011, Hernández returned to the VSL Rays, slashing a torrid .402/.503/.732 with 21 home runs and 66 RBI in 69 games with the team. He was promoted to the Rookie-level Princeton Rays in 2012, where he hit .231/.349/.394 with 5 home runs and 24 RBI. He split the 2013 season between the Low-A Hudson Valley Renegades and the Single-A Bowling Green Hot Rods, accumulating a .227/.286/.364 slash line in 46 games between the two teams. He returned to Bowling Green for the 2014 season, posting a .249/.301/.401 slash line with 9 home runs and 63 RBI.

=== Arizona Diamondbacks ===
Hernández was selected by the Arizona Diamondbacks from the Rays with the first overall pick in the 2014 Rule 5 draft. Hernández began the 2015 season on the disabled list after breaking a bone in his left hand. He had a rehabilitation assignment in June with the Triple-A Reno Aces and the Single-A Kane County Cougars, then was activated to the Diamondbacks' MLB roster on July 4.

Hernández made his MLB debut on July 12, 2015, and appeared in 31 games for the 2015 Diamondbacks, batting .161/.257/.194. In 2016, he appeared in four MLB games with Arizona, batting .182 with one home run, which came on August 10 off of Jerry Blevins, helping the Diamondbacks defeat the New York Mets, 3−2, at Citi Field in 12 innings. His bulk of work in 2016 came in Double-A with the Mobile BayBears and in High-A with the Visalia Rawhide. He was assigned to the Double-A Jackson Generals to begin the 2017 season. On June 23, 2017, Hernández was designated for assignment by the Diamondbacks, removing him from their 40-man roster. He was outrighted to Jackson on June 27, and remained in Double-A to finish the year, logging a slash line of .197/.263/.352. He elected free agency following the season on November 6.

=== Boston Red Sox ===
On January 8, 2018, Hernández signed a minor league contract with the Boston Red Sox organization. On March 23, 2018, he was suspended 50 games without pay, following a second positive test for a drug of abuse, in violation of the Minor League Drug Prevention and Treatment Program. He was activated from the restricted list at the end of May, and was assigned to the Triple-A Pawtucket Red Sox where he batted .205 with one home run and 14 RBIs in 47 games.

Hernández started the 2019 season with the Double-A Portland Sea Dogs, then was assigned to Triple-A Pawtucket in late April. He was selected to Boston's active MLB roster on May 17, when Sandy León was placed on the paternity list. Hernández was returned to Pawtucket on May 20, without making an appearance with Boston. For the 2019 MLB London Series at the end of June, Hernández traveled to London with the Red Sox as an extra player not on the active roster, in case of injury. He was designated for assignment by the Red Sox on July 2, in order to open a spot on the 40-man roster for Trevor Kelley. The team sent Hernández outright to Pawtucket the next day. Overall with Portland and Pawtucket in 2019, Hernández appeared in 54 minor league games, batting .192 with six home runs and 21 RBIs. He elected free agency on October 1.

=== St. Louis Cardinals ===
On January 7, 2020, Hernández signed a minor league deal with the St. Louis Cardinals organization. He did not appear for the organization due to the cancellation of the minor league season because of the COVID-19 pandemic. On May 27, Hernández was released by the Cardinals.

=== Kansas City Royals ===
On July 9, 2020, Hernandez signed a minor league contract with the Kansas City Royals. On July 23, Hernandez was selected to the 40-man and active rosters. He was designated for assignment on August 2 after going 2-for-4 in 4 games with the Royals and outrighted on August 5. On October 15, Hernandez elected free agency.

=== Toros de Tijuana ===
On June 24, 2021, Hernández signed with the Toros de Tijuana of the Mexican League. Hernández hit .244/.279/.366 with 1 home run and 4 RBI in 14 games with Tijuana before he was released on July 20.

=== Trois-Rivières Aigles ===
On January 11, 2023, Hernández signed with the Trois-Rivières Aigles of the Frontier League. In 22 games for the Aigles, he batted .242/.329/.333 with one home run and five RBI. On August 4, Hernández was released by Trois-Rivières.

On March 20, 2024, Hernández signed with the Staten Island FerryHawks of the Atlantic League of Professional Baseball. However he was released prior to the start of the season.

=== Cleburne Railroaders ===
On February 26, 2026, Hernández signed with the Hagerstown Flying Boxcars of the Atlantic League of Professional Baseball. On March 31, Hernández was traded to the Cleburne Railroaders of the American Association of Professional Baseball in exchange for a player to be named later. In 26 games, he batted .259/.357/.318 with no home runs and eight RBI.

=== Long Island Ducks ===
On July 2, 2026, Hernández was traded to the Long Island Ducks of the Atlantic League of Professional Baseball in exchange for a player to be named later. He was released on August 18.

=== York Revolution ===
On August 22, 2026, Hernández signed with the York Revolution of the Atlantic League of Professional Baseball.

== See also ==
- List of Major League Baseball players from Venezuela
