= Trevor Rosenthal =

American baseball player (born 1990)

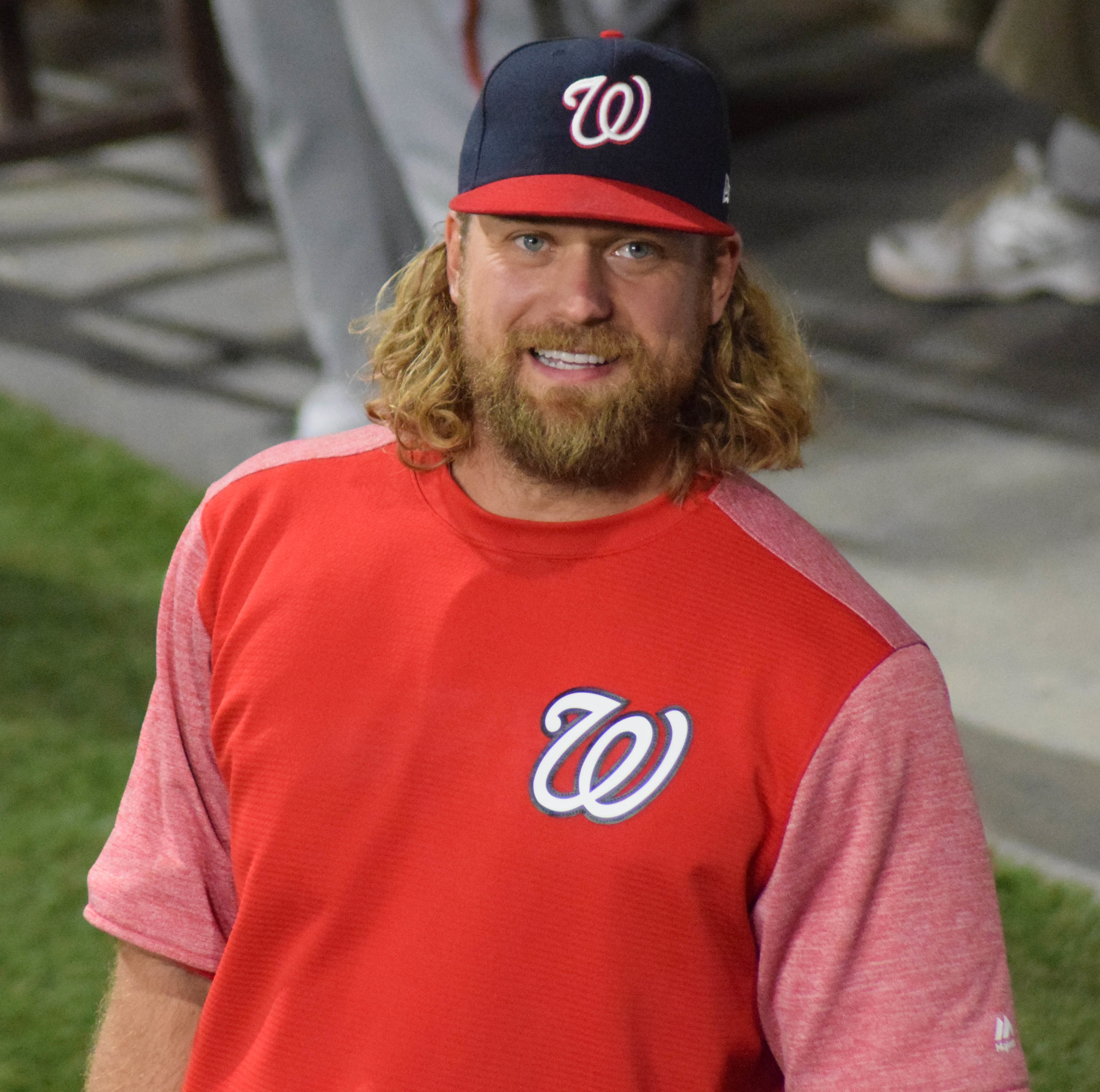
- Rosenthal with the Nationals in 2019
- Pitcher
- Born: May 29, 1990 (age 36); Lee's Summit, Missouri, U.S.
- Batted: Right Threw: Right

MLB debut
- July 18, 2012, for the St. Louis Cardinals

Last MLB appearance
- September 27, 2020, for the San Diego Padres

MLB statistics
- Win–loss record: 12–25
- Earned run average: 3.36
- Strikeouts: 490
- Saves: 132
- Stats at Baseball Reference

Teams
- St. Louis Cardinals (2012–2017); Washington Nationals (2019); Detroit Tigers (2019); Kansas City Royals (2020); San Diego Padres (2020)

Career highlights and awards
- All-Star (2015)

Trevor Jordan Rosenthal (born May 29, 1990) is an American former professional baseball pitcher. He played in Major League Baseball (MLB) for the St. Louis Cardinals, Washington Nationals, Detroit Tigers, Kansas City Royals, and San Diego Padres. A power pitcher, Rosenthal is known for a fastball that is difficult for hitters to pick up and reaches velocities at or over 100 miles per hour (160 km/h). He throws and bats right-handed, stands 6 feet 2 inches (1.88 m) tall, and weighs 230 pounds (100 kg).

From the Kansas City metropolitan area, Rosenthal attended Cowley Community College in Arkansas City, Kansas, playing shortstop for the Cowley Tigers. The Cardinals selected him in the 21st round of the 2009 amateur draft and he became a starting pitcher in the minor leagues. In the major leagues, he has pitched exclusively out of the bullpen, filling middle relief, set-up, and closing roles.

An MLB All-Star in 2015, Rosenthal set the Cardinals' franchise record for saves that season with 48. He was an integral part of the Cardinals' World Series run in 2013, making 74 appearances, while striking out 108 batters, in 75 1/3 innings pitched, allowing a 2.63 earned run average (ERA), and converting three saves. Moreover, Rosenthal recorded 20 1/3 scoreless innings to begin his postseason career. In 2015, he became the third-youngest pitcher in major league history to record back-to-back 40 save seasons.

Due to a tear in the ulnar collateral ligament of the right elbow and subsequent reconstructive surgery in August 2017, Rosenthal missed the 2018 season, but returned to play in 2019.

== Early life ==
Trevor Rosenthal, the son of Judy (Henke) and Russ Rosenthal, was born and raised in the Kansas City, Missouri, area. He graduated from Lee's Summit West High School in Lee's Summit, Missouri.

== Amateur career ==
After graduating from Lee's Summit West, Rosenthal attended Cowley County Community College in Arkansas City, Kansas, to play collegiate baseball for the Cowley County baseball team. In 2009, the team qualified for the Junior College World Series. When Cardinals scout Aaron Looper first spotted Rosenthal, he was a shortstop who had just started pitching — he had totalled 4 2/3 innings pitched (IP) at that time — and was throwing well over 90 miles per hour (140 km/h) off the mound in a tournament. Looper watched him for just one inning in that tournament. Cardinals director of scouting Jeff Luhnow remarked that “Looper thought he had ability and could get better, had great arm action, great stuff and was pretty good today but could get a lot better.”

== Playing career ==
=== St. Louis Cardinals ===
==== Minor leagues (2009–12) ====
The Cardinals drafted Rosenthal in the 21st round of the 2009 MLB draft. He signed for $65,000. The club first assigned him to the Gulf Coast League (GCL) in 2009, where he made 14 appearances for the GCL Cardinals and posted a ground ball rate of 58%. The next season, he moved up to the Johnson City Cardinals of the Appalachian League and spent the season there. He pitched in 10 games, starting six over 32 IP. Posting a 3–0 record (W–L), Rosenthal finished with a 2.25 earned run average (ERA), striking out 30 (SO), allowing just one home run and a 3.27 ground ball/fly ball ratio (G/F). He also posted a ground ball rate of 68%.

Said Cardinals general manager (GM) John Mozeliak of Rosenthal: "We realized we had a talent early on, when we sent him to Johnson City. Then when he went to Quad Cities, we knew exactly what we had because he really took off there." Rosenthal spent 2011 with the Quad City River Bandits, then a Cardinals Class-A affiliate, helping them to a Midwest League championship. He started the final game of the championship series in a three-game sweep of the Lansing Lugnuts, pitching six innings, allowing four hits and two walks (BB) while striking out nine in a 6–3 victory. This was Rosenthal's first full season pitching professional baseball. During the regular season, he started 22 games, pitched 120 1/3 innings with 133 S0 for a 4.11 ERA, 9.9 strikeouts per 9 innings pitched (K/9), a 1.247 walks plus hits per inning pitched (WHIP), and 52% ground ball rate.

Rosenthal's 2010 and 2011 performances earned an invite to St. Louis Cardinals spring training in 2012 where his fastball lit up radar guns and the faces among club officials. Although Mozeliak, manager Mike Matheny, and others stated that Rosenthal was ready for the major leagues, a lack of space on the roster saw him start the season with the Double-A affiliate Springfield Cardinals. He started the Midwest League All-Star Game. At Springfield, he started 17 games and tallied 94 IP, 83 SO, a 1.106 WHIP and a 2.78 ERA. He made his Major League debut later that season and also pitched three games for the Triple-A Memphis Redbirds. In the minor leagues, Rosenthal has appeared in 66 total games, making 48 starts, accumulating 285 1/3 IP, 237 hits allowed, and 98 BB for a 3.53 ERA and 1.174 WHIP. He also posted 293 SO for a ratio of 9.2 K/9.

==== Major leagues (2012–2017) ====
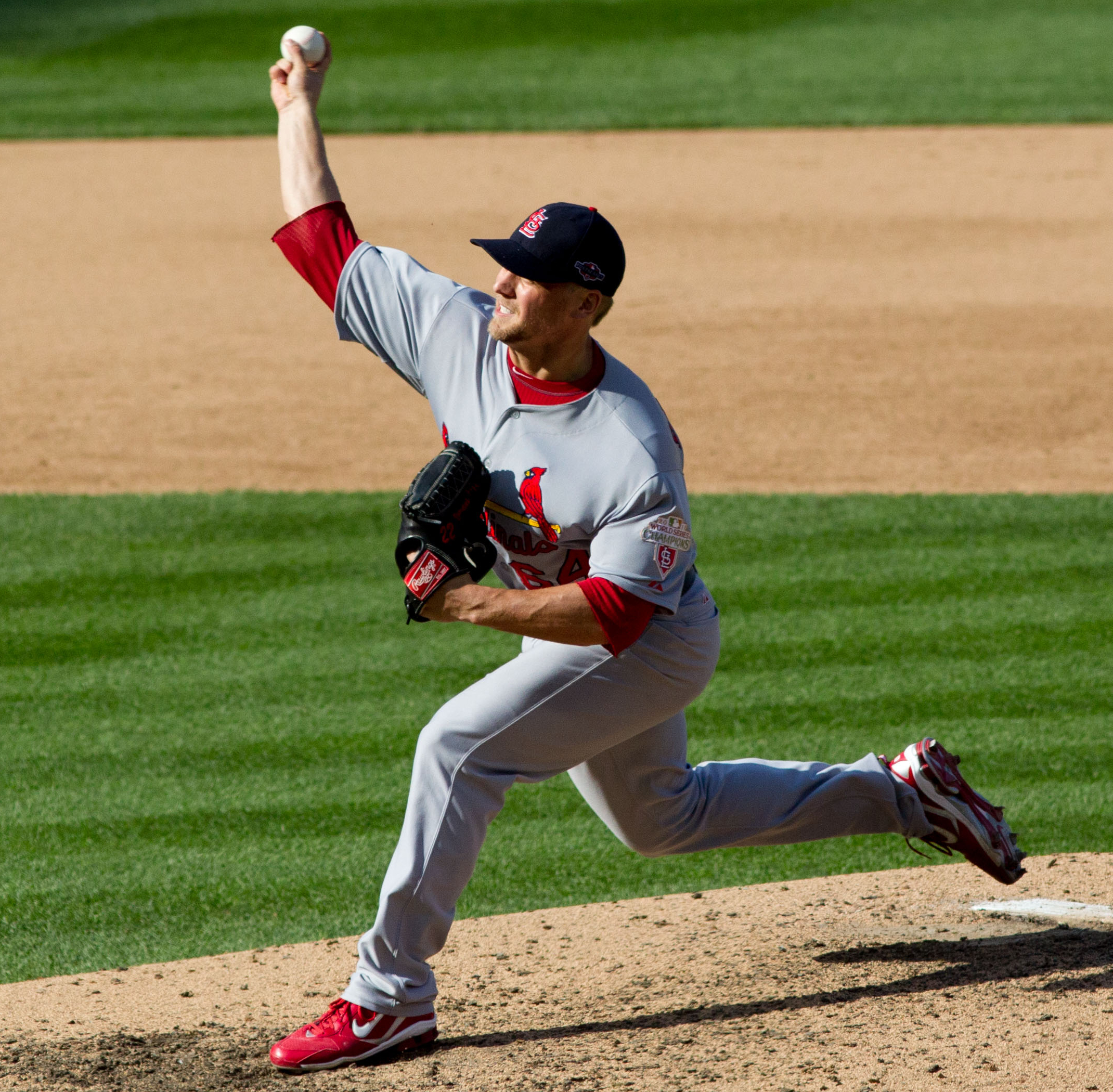
Rosenthal in 2012

The Cardinals called up Rosenthal from Springfield for the first time on July 16, 2012, and he made his debut two days later as the 2,000th player in franchise history dating back to 1882. He was also the first to be the 2,000th player for any Major League franchise. Twice briefly sent back down to Triple-A during the season, Rosenthal returned to St. Louis on August 29 and remained the rest of the year, ending the season with seven straight scoreless appearances. He posted a 2.78 ERA while striking out 25 in 22 2/3 IP and holding opponents to 14 hits in 89 plate appearances with a .175 batting average against.

Rosenthal's successful rookie season carried over into the postseason, making him instrumental in the Cardinals' playoff run as they needed bullpen help. In his playoff debut against the Washington Nationals in the National League Division Series (NLDS), he struck out the side, retiring Jayson Werth, Bryce Harper, and Adam LaRoche while allowing a single to Ryan Zimmerman. Six more scoreless appearances followed as the Cardinals advanced to the National League Championship Series (NLCS). In all, Rosenthal struck out 15 of total 30 batters faced in the 2012 playoffs.

===== 2013 =====
Rosenthal also spent the 2013 season in the bullpen. An injured ulnar collateral ligament in closer Jason Motte's elbow required Tommy John surgery to repair, forcing him to miss the entire season. Matheny reshuffled the bullpen, placing Rosenthal in the set-up role and Edward Mujica to replace Motte as the closer. However, late in the year, fatigue and ineffectiveness marred an otherwise stellar season on Mujica's part, and Matheny called upon Rosenthal to save three games late in the season. Although Matheny publicly stated that closing games would be accomplished by a committee, Rosenthal appeared most frequently to save games. For the season, Rosenthal totaled 75 1/3 IP, a 2.63 ERA, and 108 strikeouts for average of 12.9 K/9. Among MLB relievers who pitched at least 50 innings and started less than 20% of their appearances, Rosenthal's 12.9 K/9 ranked sixth.

That postseason, Rosenthal continued his dominance. He pitched 11 2/3 more scoreless innings in the NLDS against the Pittsburgh Pirates, the NLCS against the Los Angeles Dodgers, and the World Series against the Boston Red Sox, striking out 18 of the 40 batters he faced and allowing just four hits. In Game 2 of the NLCS, he entered in the ninth with fellow rookie Michael Wacha's five-hit shutout and one-run lead on the line, striking out the side to end the game. He also tallied one win and four saves. Spanning his 2012 and 2013 postseasons, Rosenthal did not allow a run in 20 1/3 postseason innings, allowing just six hits and striking out 33, for an average of 14.6 K/9.

Rosenthal's average fastball velocity in 2013 was 96.4 miles per hour (155.1 km/h), the sixth-highest among all MLB relievers. After the World Series, he expressed the desire to be a starting pitcher in 2014. However, with Motte still recovering from Tommy John surgery, Mozeliak announced Rosenthal would be the closer at the beginning of the next season. In response, he quipped, "They don't know it yet, but I'm still competing for a starting spot."

===== 2014 =====
Despite a rocky start to the season, Rosenthal settled into the closer role well. He stayed in the closer role despite the return of former closer Jason Motte and a brief ninth-inning experiment with Pat Neshek. Rosenthal finished second in the NL with 45 saves. He exhibited unusual control problems, walking 42 batters in 70 1/3 IP, more than double the walks in 2013. In spite of the increase in walks, he allowed a 3.20 ERA and struck out 87 batters, an average of 11.1 per nine innings.

===== 2015 =====
From May 5 to July 3, 2015, Rosenthal threw 23 2/3 IP scoreless innings. The streak ended against the San Diego Padres when Jedd Gyorko singled home a go-ahead run in the ninth. At the time, it was the longest of the season among relief pitchers in the National League. With a 0.70 ERA in 37 appearances and 24 of 25 saves converted through July 6, he was selected by fellow players to his first MLB All-Star Game at Great American Ball Park in Cincinnati. He received more votes than any other NL reliever.

In August 2015, Baseball America published that National League managers and coaches rated Rosenthal the third-best reliever in the league. After saving his 40th game against the Arizona Diamondbacks on August 26, Rosenthal became the third-youngest MLB pitcher to record back-to-back 40-save seasons, and just the second Cardinals pitcher to do so. The first Cardinals pitcher to achieve this feat was Lee Smith, who registered 40 or more saves each season from 1991–93. He became the seventh reliever overall to post back-to-back seasons of 45 or more saves. In a September 28 contest against the Pirates, Rosenthal gained his 48th save, breaking the franchise single-season record, which Smith and Jason Isringhausen shared entering the season. He finished the regular season with the same save total, a 2.10 ERA, the fourth-highest pitch total among NL relievers, and an average fastball velocity of 97.6 miles per hour (157.1 km/h). Rosenthal was a co-winner of the 2015 J. G. Taylor Spink St. Louis Baseball Man of the Year Award.

===== 2016 =====
Arbitration-eligible for the first time prior to the 2016 season, Rosenthal and the Cardinals agreed to a $5.6 million salary on January 15, 2016, a raise from $530,000. He recorded his 100th career save by striking out the side against the Chicago Cubs on April 20, becoming the fifth Cardinals pitcher to accumulate 100 saves. On two occasions, he walked the bases loaded without recording an out: on May 12 against Anaheim, and on June 3 against San Francisco, totaling 16 walks in 17 IP for the season through the June 3 game. The Cardinals removed him from the role of closer on June 25 after his ERA had risen to 5.63, with an average of 7.9 walks per nine innings. He was replaced by rookie Seung-hwan Oh. He was relegated to a setup role on the staff. Rosenthal's 2016 season ended with a career-high 4.46 ERA in 45 games.

===== 2017 =====
Rosenthal began the 2017 season as the Cardinals' setup man with Oh as closer, but later replaced Oh as closer in July. On August 17, Rosenthal was placed on the 10-day disabled list due to a right elbow problem. It was later revealed that he had sustained an injury of the ulnar collateral ligament in the right elbow, necessitating reconstructive surgery, also known as "Tommy John" surgery. The injury abbreviated Rosenthal's 2017 campaign and he was expected to miss most or all of 2018. He made 50 appearances in 2017, recording a 3.40 ERA, 11 saves, 76 strikeouts, and a career-best 14.3 K/9.

Unable to agree to a contract for 2018, the Cardinals gave Rosenthal an outright release on November 6, 2017, making him a free agent. He earned $6.4 million in 2017, and was due for a salary increase as an arbitration-eligible player.

On April 4, 2018, reports emerged that Rosenthal had signed with the Miami Marlins. However, he denied that he had signed a contract, stating that he would instead remain a free agent, continue rehabilitation, and work out for interested teams once he was fully recovered.

=== Washington Nationals ===
On November 3, 2018, Rosenthal signed a one-year deal with a "conditional" option for the 2020 season, to join the Washington Nationals organization. Under this contract, $7 million is guaranteed and Rosenthal could earn up to $30 million over two years if he becomes the team's closer and regularly finishes games.

As of April 6, 2019, Rosenthal had an ERA of infinity for the 2019 season after walking four batters, giving up three hits, and allowing seven earned runs without retiring one batter. He was placed on the disabled list with a viral infection. At the time of the injury, Rosenthal had an ERA of 36.00 in seven appearances.

After returning from the injured list in June, Rosenthal's struggles continued. After he walked three batters without recording an out against the Atlanta Braves on June 22, 2019, the Nationals released him the following morning. He finished his tenure in Washington with a 22.74 ERA.

=== Detroit Tigers ===
On June 29, 2019, Rosenthal signed a minor-league deal with the Detroit Tigers. On July 15, the Tigers selected Rosenthal's contract. He was designated for assignment on August 7, 2019. After clearing waivers three days later, Rosenthal elected free agency.

=== New York Yankees ===
On August 19, 2019, Rosenthal signed a minor league contract with the New York Yankees. He made one appearance for the Triple–A Scranton/Wilkes-Barre RailRiders, and allowed four runs in 1/3 of an inning. Rosenthal elected free agency following the season on November 4.

=== Kansas City Royals ===
On December 7, 2019, Rosenthal signed a minor league contract with the Kansas City Royals. Rosenthal had his contract selected by the Royals on March 25, 2020. In his first 11 games as a Royal, Rosenthal carried a superb 0.87 ERA over 10 1/3 innings pitched over 11 games to go along with 14 strikeouts.

=== San Diego Padres ===
On August 29, 2020, Rosenthal was traded to the San Diego Padres for Edward Olivares and Dylan Coleman. He pitched 9 games for the Padres and allowed no earned runs in 10 innings. Overall, Rosenthal finished the 2020 season with 1.90 ERA with 11 saves and 38 strikeouts in 23 2/3 innings between the Royals and Padres.

=== Oakland Athletics ===
On February 18, 2021, Rosenthal signed a one-year, $11 million contract with the Oakland Athletics organization. On April 7, 2021, it was announced that Rosenthal would require thoracic outlet surgery and underwent the procedure the next day. On April 8, Rosenthal was placed on the 60-day injured list. On July 7, it was announced that Rosenthal tore a labrum in his hip that required surgery, ending his 2021 season without making an appearance for Oakland.

=== Milwaukee Brewers ===
On July 21, 2022, Rosenthal signed a one-year, $4.5 million contract with the San Francisco Giants. Due to a hamstring injury he suffered in June, he never played in a game for the Giants organization.

On August 2, 2022, Rosenthal was traded to the Milwaukee Brewers in exchange for Tristan Peters. He began a rehab assignment for his hamstring injury on August 13 with the Triple-A Nashville Sounds. On August 23, Rosenthal left an appearance with a lat injury. On August 27, it was announced that Rosenthal would likely miss the remainder of the season as a result.

On the season in his three rehab games for Nashville, he posted an 18.00 ERA with two strikeouts in 2.0 innings pitched. On November 6, 2022, Rosenthal was granted free agency.

=== Detroit Tigers (second stint) ===
On March 4, 2023, Rosenthal signed a minor league contract with the Detroit Tigers organization that included an invitation to spring training. He made two appearances for the Triple–A Toledo Mud Hens before suffering a right elbow sprain in late April. He began a rehab assignment with the Low–A Lakeland Flying Tigers on June 9. However, five days later, it was announced that Rosenthal would undergo a UCL reconstruction revision surgery on his right elbow. On July 2, Rosenthal was released by the Tigers.

== Pitching profile ==
A sinking fastball that reaches the mid-90s miles per hour (MPH) and induces ground balls at a rate of over 50% was seen as a competitive advantage. However, Rosenthal also throws a straighter fastball higher in the strike zone with a regular velocity of 98 miles per hour (158 km/h) to change batters' eye level, which they have difficulty picking up. This pitch routinely touches 101 miles per hour (163 km/h).

He also throws a curveball and changeup that, according to Bleacher Report's Doug Mead, are "effective". However, according to Thomas Belmont of Baseball Instinct, the curveball is actually a slider. The pitch has sharp movement and has the potential to be a major league quality out pitch. Observed one American League scout during the 2013 World Series, "He's got one of those loose-arm deliveries that creates great life on his fastball. He has such tight spin on his slider that (Shane) Victorino and (Dustin) Pedroia looked helpless against it." Rosenthal has developed his changeup to be an average pitch since 2011 when he played his first full season of professional baseball with Quad Cities, expanding the quality of the pitch sequence which he is able to throw to major league hitters. One unusual trend about the results is that Rosenthal has consistently had a higher than league average batting average on balls in play (BABIP) — a statistic in which league average is typically about .300. In 2009, Rosenthal's BABIP was .362 and it was .334 in 2011. In 2010, it dipped to the other extreme, to .262. In his first major league season, 2013, it was .347.

== Awards and accomplishments ==
Championships earned or shared
Title	Times	Dates	Ref
Midwest League champion	1	2011	
National League champion	1	2013	

Accomplishments

- St. Louis Cardinals' saves record of 48 (2015) (held until passed by Ryan Helsley with 49 saves in 2024)
- Third-youngest MLB pitcher with consecutive 40-save seasons (2014–15)
- Second Cardinals pitcher with consecutive 40-save seasons (2014–15)

Major league awards

- Baseball America All-Rookie team, Relief pitcher (2013)
- Baseball America Toolbox Award for "Best reliever" (2015 – 3rd)
- J. G. Taylor Spink St. Louis Baseball Man of the Year (2015)
- Major League Baseball All-Star (2015)

Minor league awards

- #39 prospect rating (pre-2013), Baseball America
- #43 prospect rating (pre-2013), MLB.com
- The Cardinal Nation/Scout.com Cardinals Top Prospect #3 (2013)
- The Cardinal Nation/Scout.com Minor League Starting Pitcher of the Year (2012)
- Texas League mid-season & post-season All-Star (2012)
- The Cardinal Nation/Scout.com Cardinals Top Prospect #12 (2012)
- The Cardinal Nation/Scout.com 2011 Quad Cities River Bandits Starting Pitcher of the Year
- Midwest League Pitcher of the Week: August 18–24, 2011
- Midwest League All-Star (2011)

== Personal life ==
Rosenthal is married to the former Lindsey Bowers, whom he wed in December 2011 in Bristol, Tennessee. They have two daughters, born on September 13, 2013 and August 28, 2015. They reside in Des Peres, Missouri. Rosenthal is not Jewish, despite the last name confusing many into thinking so. Rosenthal is a Christian.

Over the 2012 offseason, Rosenthal stayed in St. Louis to work out with former Cardinals starting pitcher Chris Carpenter. Two offseasons later, he participated in a training regimen with outfielder and teammate Matt Holliday, which Holliday described as "NFL program", consisting of "sled pushing, tire flipping and some fireman carries", and each player taking turns carrying each other for about 20 meters. Rosenthal was building strength in anticipation of pitching from the bullpen in 2014, which the Cardinals already had announced would be his role for that season.

On January 13, 2016, Rosenthal paid a surprise visit to Ethan Cortez, a 10-year-old boy who was recovering from a dog bite at St. Louis Children's Hospital. Later that month, Rosenthal served as the grand marshal for the 2016 Beggin' Pets Parade, a showcase for pets in costumes, held in Soulard, a historic French neighborhood of St. Louis. Four years earlier, this parade had set the Guinness world record for "most dogs in costumed attire".

== See also ==
- List of baseball players who underwent Tommy John surgery
- List of St. Louis Cardinals team records
