= Kate Longworth =

Fox Sports Arizona reporter

Kate Longworth is a reporter for Fox Sports Arizona covering the Arizona Diamondbacks since April 2015.

== Career ==
After graduating from college, Longworth served from 2001 to 2002 as the media relations director for Major League Baseball's Arizona Fall League.

She was a sideline reporter for college football for the MountainWest Sports Network (The Mtn.) and the Big Ten Network.

From 2003 to 2005, Longworth worked for Comcast SportsNet Mid-Atlantic. She worked as a producer and associate producer, covering sports news in the Washington, DC/Baltimore area. Longworth contributed to both O’s All Access, a program focused on the Baltimore Orioles, and SportsNite, a nightly sports show.

Longworth was the first female sports anchor/reporter at KPSP-TV (CBS) in Palm Springs, CA.

From 2008 to 2015 Longworth was a game reporter for the Oakland A’s, host of All A’s, and a reporter for Raiders Postgame Live, at Comcast SportsNet in San Francisco. She was also an anchor/reporter for SportsNet Central, and a game reporter for the San Jose Sharks and San Jose Earthquakes. She joined the network in June 2008.

== Education and personal life ==
Longworth received her B.A. in Journalism from the University of Arizona, where she was an assistant sports editor and writer for the school's student newspaper, the Arizona Daily Wildcat. She lives with her husband Brian.
