= Dorothy Parvaz =

- هما دوروتی پرواز
- Born: Tehran, Iran
- Citizenship: United States
- Education: University of British Columbia; University of Arizona
- Employer: NPR

Homa Dorothy Parvaz (Persian: هما دوروتی پرواز) is an Iranian-born journalist. She has worked for Al Jazeera and NPR.

She holds both Canada and United States citizenships.

== Early life and education ==
Homa Dorothy Parvaz was born in October 1971 in Tehran, Iran to an Iranian father and an American mother. She lived in Iran until she was ten years old, then spent the next four years in Dubai. Parvaz moved to Canada with her family in 1985, ultimately graduating from a Canadian high school.

Parvaz obtained her undergraduate degree in English literature from the University of British Columbia. She subsequently obtained a master's degree in journalism from the University of Arizona.

She has been the recipient of journalism fellowships at Harvard and Cambridge.

== Career ==
After obtaining her degree from the University of British Columbia, Parvaz worked for the English language edition of the Asahi Shimbun in Japan.

Following her sojourn in Japan, Parvaz obtained her master's degree in journalism from the University of Arizona. She moved to Seattle in 1999, where she worked first for The Seattle Times, then as a columnist, feature writer, and ultimately editorial board member for the Seattle Post-Intelligencer. After the latter ceased to exist as a print newspaper, and following her journalism fellowships, she accepted employment with Al Jazeera, for whom she reported on the 2011 Japanese earthquake and tsunami.

Parvaz works at NPR, where she focuses on international news. She is based in Washington, D.C.

== 2011 disappearance ==
Parvaz arrived in Syria on Friday, April 29, 2011, via Qatar Airways to cover recent protests there for Al Jazeera. She was not heard from after landing at the airport, and it was suspected that she had been detained at the airport. Her family feared for her safety. Syria's efforts to limit foreign media coverage of recent events had previously led to the detention of numerous journalists.

On May 2, 2011, Parvaz's family released the following statement:

"Dorothy Parvaz is a dearly loved daughter, sister and fiancée. We haven't heard from her in four days and believe that she is being held by the Syrian government. Dorothy is a global citizen – she grew up in Iran, UAE, Canada and the United States, where she became a determined journalist.

"She is dedicated to the profession as a force for peace and justice in the world. She has worked at newspapers across the globe, from Japan to Arizona, from Seattle, Washington, to Doha, Qatar, where she now works for Al Jazeera English online.

"She has always known who she was, whether buying groceries for her grandmother in Tehran or covering the aftermath of the tsunami in Japan. She is tough and she is a fighter – no doubt, she is stronger than us. We need to know where she is. We need to know who is holding her, and that she is comfortable. She is very loved. We need to know that she is safe."

Voices calling for her release included her immediate family, her fiancé (Luxembourg-based attorney Todd Barker), Cambridge University, Al Jazeera, and the Iranian government. With friends around the world, Parvaz's story was widely reported, with press freedom advocacy groups also taking up her cause. Other voices calling for her release included Amnesty International, the Doha Centre for Media Freedom, Al Karama for Human Rights, the Committee to Protect Journalists, Reporters Without Borders, and the U.S. State Department.

It was reported on May 5, 2011, that Parvaz was being held by the Syrian government, which Syria confirmed. Her family and friends called for her release. Facebook and Twitter campaigns were also underway.

It was further reported on May 7, 2011, that U.S. Ambassador Robert Ford met with a senior Syrian official in an attempt to obtain more information about Parvaz.

The family released the following additional statement:

"Our family has not heard from Dorothy in six days. While the Syrian government has confirmed that they have detained her, we demand that Dorothy is returned to her loved ones.

"We know that Syria will continue to treat her with the respect she deserves. We will continue to work tirelessly for her return, as will her friends and colleagues across the globe — as will concerned public officials, citizens and journalists who hear Dorothy's story.

"Dorothy Parvaz is a dearly loved daughter, sister and fiancée, and a committed journalist. Dorothy firmly believes that journalism is a force for justice across the globe. We know that Dorothy is staying strong. She is doing her part. Let's do ours to ensure her safe return. We need her released immediately and returned to us."

Syrian newspaper Al Watan reported that the Syrian government claimed Parvaz left Syria on May 1, 2011, after being denied entry to the country because she held a tourist visa instead of a journalist visa. This claim was unconfirmed, most notably by Parvaz herself.

As of May 11, 2011, unsubstantiated reports had emerged indicating that the Syrian government handed Parvaz over to Iranian authorities and that she might be held in Tehran.

On May 18, 2011, after disappearing on assignment in Syria for 19 days, Parvaz was released and sent back to Doha by Iranian authorities. By the end of the day, she had released an article detailing her experiences. Syria claimed she had entered Syria illegally with multiple passports, including an expired Iranian one. However, there was no issue with her passports. Her Iranian passport was extended and stamped upon entry by Syrian immigration.

Parvaz was named the 2013 recipient of the McGill Medal for Journalistic Courage from the Grady College of Journalism and Mass Communication.
