= Josh Collmenter =

American baseball player (born 1986)

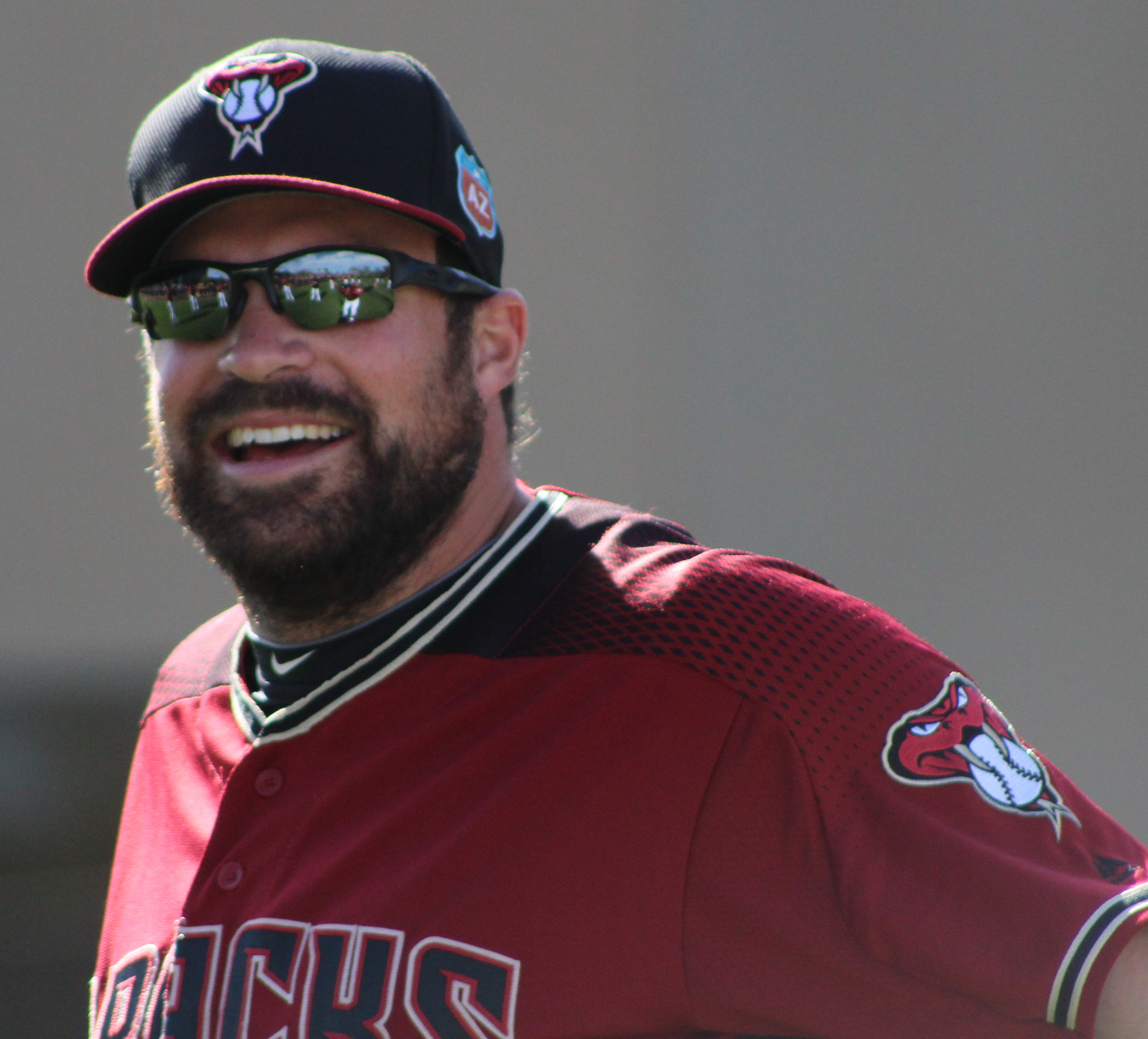
- Collmenter with the Arizona Diamondbacks in 2016
- Pitcher
- Born: February 7, 1986 (age 40); Homer, Michigan, U.S.
- Batted: Right Threw: Right

MLB debut
- April 17, 2011, for the Arizona Diamondbacks

Last MLB appearance
- May 24, 2017, for the Atlanta Braves

MLB statistics
- Win–loss record: 38–35
- Earned run average: 3.64
- Strikeouts: 494
- Stats at Baseball Reference

Teams
- Arizona Diamondbacks (2011–2016); Atlanta Braves (2016–2017)

Joshua Michael Collmenter (born February 7, 1986) is an American former professional baseball pitcher who played in Major League Baseball (MLB) for the Arizona Diamondbacks and Atlanta Braves between 2011 and 2017, and currently acts as the color man for Diamondbacks Radio. He attended Central Michigan University and was the 2007 Mid-American Conference Pitcher of the Year.

== Early life ==
Joshua Michael Collmenter was born on February 7, 1986, in rural Homer, Michigan, where he grew up. He learned to pitch by watching baseball on television and reading about how to grip different pitches in Sports Illustrated. His pitching mechanics, however, are the product of a childhood spent with his brothers entertaining themselves by throwing tomahawks at things such as snakes and trees. The process resulted in the development of an unorthodox, extremely overhand pitching motion.

Collmenter attended Homer High School, where he played baseball, basketball and football and graduated as the salutatorian of his class in 2004. Collmenter was one of the top pitchers in Michigan high school baseball history. In 2004, Collmenter led the Trojans to a 38–0 record and the first undefeated championship season in the state's history. That season propelled the Trojans to a national-record 75 game win streak. Collmenter won 18 games in the 2004 season, the third highest total in state history. He recorded a state-record 13 shutouts that season while striking out 223 batters and notching a 0.13 ERA. Collmenter finished his high school career with 49 wins, 23 shutouts, 546 strikeouts and a 0.99 ERA, all of which rank in the top six in state history. Homer compiled a record of 110–18 while Collmenter was with the team.

== College career ==
Prior to playing professionally, Collmenter attended Central Michigan University, with whom he played from 2005 to 2007. In his first season with the Chippewas, Collmenter went 7–1 with a 2.70 ERA in 16 games (10 starts). The following season, Collmenter went 8–5 with a 3.41 ERA in 15 games (14 starts). In 2006, he played collegiate summer baseball with the Hyannis Mets of the Cape Cod Baseball League. He went 9–4 with a 1.93 ERA in 15 starts in 2007. He was named the 2007 Mid-American Conference Baseball Pitcher of the Year.

== Professional career ==
=== Draft and minor leagues ===
Collmenter was drafted in the 15th round (463rd overall) of the 2007 Major League Baseball draft by the Arizona Diamondbacks. He started his professional career that year, playing for the Yakima Bears in 2007, going 6–3 with a 2.71 ERA in 14 games (12 starts). In 2008, Collmenter pitched for the South Bend Silver Hawks, going 12–8 with a 3.41 ERA in 27 starts. He was a well-known figure that season for growing a mustache in the hope of turning the Silver Hawks fortunes around.

The following season, Collmenter went 8–10 with a 4.15 ERA in 27 starts for the Visalia Rawhide. As well, he struck out 152 batters in 145 1/3 innings that season. He split the 2010 season between the Rawhide, Mobile Bay Bears and Reno Aces, going a combined 14–8 with a 3.38 ERA in 25 starts.

=== Arizona Diamondbacks (2011–2016) ===
Collmenter made his major league debut on April 17, 2011, against the San Francisco Giants. Collmenter entered the game in the 11th inning of a 5–5 game. He pitched two perfect innings with two strikeouts. The Diamondbacks would go on to win the game in the bottom of the 12th when Stephen Drew drove in Justin Upton for the game's winning run, cementing Collmenter's first big league win.

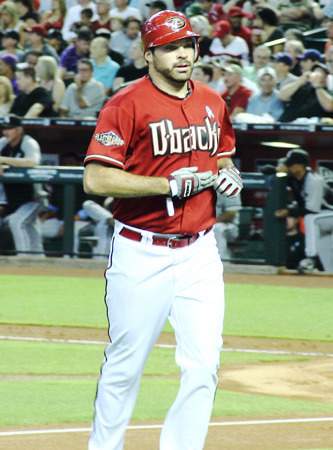
Collmenter at Chase Field in 2011

Collmenter caught the eye of some observers due to his unusual over-the-top delivery. It was thought that the deceptiveness of the delivery attributed to much of his success. He was the first pitcher since earned runs were recorded in 1912 to have given up four or fewer total earned runs and 20 or fewer total hits in his first six starts. Although Collmenter didn't possess superior velocity to his fastball (average 87 MPH), he relied on throwing a sizable amount of cutters and changeups to keep hitters off-balance. He also threw a curveball less frequently.

In 2011, Collmenter got his first chance to pitch in the playoffs when he faced the Milwaukee Brewers in Game 3 of the Division Series. The D-Backs won the game 8–1 and Collmenter got the win. However, the Brewers would go on to win the best-of-five series, 3–2. Collmenter made 31 appearances (24 starts) for the Diamondbacks during his rookie campaign, compiling a 10-10 record and 3.38 ERA with 100 strikeouts across 154 1/3 innings pitched.

Collmenter began the 2012 season in the rotation, but after going 0–2 with a 9.82 ERA in 4 starts and an average of less than 5 innings per start, Collmenter was demoted to the long relief role on April 30, and Patrick Corbin was called up to take his place in the rotation. He pitched in 28 games (11 starts) for Arizona on the year, registering a 5-3 record and 3.69 ERA with 80 strikeouts across 90 1/3 innings pitched.

Collmenter made 49 appearances out of the bullpen during the 2013 season, pitching to a 5-5 record and 3.13 ERA with 85 strikeouts over 92 innings of work. In 2014, he made 33 appearances (28 starts) for the Diamondbacks, posting an 11-9 record and 3.46 ERA with 115 strikeouts and one save across 179 1/3 innings pitched.

Collmenter pitched in 44 contests (including 12 starts) for Arizona in 2015, compiling a 4-6 record and 3.79 ERA with 63 strikeouts and one save over 121 innings of work. On November 3, 2015, the Diamondbacks exercised Collmenter's 2016 option.

Collmenter made 15 appearances for Arizona in 2016, recording a 4.84 ERA with 17 strikeouts across 22 1/3 innings pitched. On July 30, 2016, Collmenter was designated for assignment by the Diamondbacks, who released him after he cleared waivers on August 7.

=== Chicago Cubs ===
On August 10, 2016, the Chicago Cubs signed Collmenter to a minor league contract. He made four starts for the Triple-A Iowa Cubs, compiling a 1-0 record and 2.25 ERA with nine strikeouts over 16 innings of work.

=== Atlanta Braves (2016–2017) ===
On September 14, 2016, Collmenter was traded to the Atlanta Braves. Collmenter made his Braves debut three days later, starting a game for the first time since June 7, 2015, and earning a win against the Washington Nationals. He was the sixteenth pitcher to have made a start for the Braves during the 2016 season, breaking a franchise record for the number of starting pitchers used in a single season. Collmenter made three starts for Atlanta down the stretch, logging a 2-0 record and 2.37 ERA with 16 strikeouts over 19 innings of work.

The team re-signed Collmenter to a one-year contract worth $1.2 million on November 7, 2016. He pitched well to start the 2017 season, but began struggling in May and was designated for assignment on May 25, 2017. Collmenter cleared waivers and was sent outright to the Triple-A Gwinnett Braves on May 29. After pitching in five games for Gwinnett at the end of the season, he elected free agency on September 30.

=== Career MLB statistics ===
In seven MLB seasons, Collmenter posted a 38-35 won-loss record with a 3.64 ERA. He appeared in 214 games, started 78 games and finished 56 games. In 695 1/3 innings pitched, he allowed 665 hits, 168 walks and struck out 494. Defensively, he handled 134 total chances (49 putouts, 85 assists) without an error for a perfect 1.000 fielding percentage.

=== Auckland Tuatara ===
In 2018, Collmenter was added to the New Zealand national baseball team U15 development squad as pitching coach. On August 27, 2018, Collmenter was the first player signed by the Auckland Tuatara, a new expansion team of the Australian Baseball League based in Auckland, New Zealand, for the 2018–19 season. He returned to the club for the 2019–20 season.

== Post-playing career ==
Collmenter was named as the New Zealand pitching coach for the 2021 World Baseball Classic Qualifier. He was also announced as a broadcaster for a series of Spring Training webcasts of Diamondbacks games in 2023.
