= Rubby De La Rosa =

Dominican baseball pitcher (born 1989)

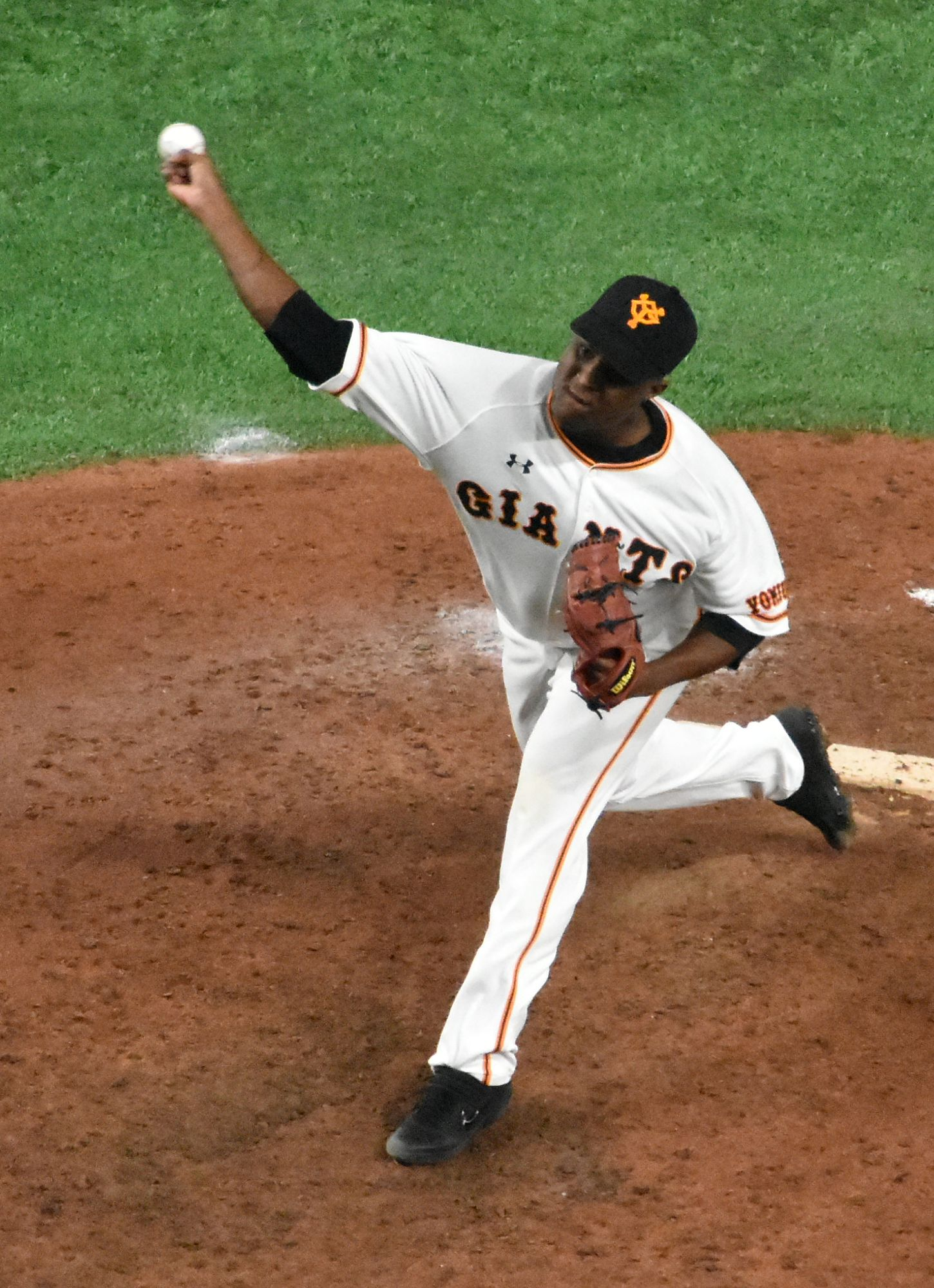
- De La Rosa with the Yomiuri Giants
- Pitcher
- Born: 4 March 1989 (age 37); Santo Domingo, Dominican Republic
- Batted: Right Threw: Right

Professional debut
- MLB: 24 May, 2011, for the Los Angeles Dodgers
- NPB: 15 July, 2019, for the Yomiuri Giants

Last appearance
- MLB: August 1, 2017, for the Arizona Diamondbacks
- NPB: September 28, 2022, for the Yimiuri Giants

MLB statistics
- Win–loss record: 26–30
- Earned run average: 4.49
- Strikeouts: 356

NPB statistics
- Win–loss record: 4-0
- Earned run average: 2.53
- Strikeouts: 118
- Saves: 33
- Stats at Baseball Reference

Teams
- Los Angeles Dodgers (2011–2012); Boston Red Sox (2013–2014); Arizona Diamondbacks (2015–2017); Yomiuri Giants (2019–2022)

Rubby Nick De La Rosa Corporan (born 4 March 1989) is a Dominican former professional baseball pitcher. He played in Major League Baseball (MLB) for the Los Angeles Dodgers, Boston Red Sox, and Arizona Diamondbacks, and in Nippon Professional Baseball (NPB) for the Yomiuri Giants.

== Playing career ==
=== Los Angeles Dodgers ===
De La Rosa signed with the Dodgers in 2007 and spent two seasons with their Dominican Summer League team. He was transferred to the Arizona League Dodgers in 2009 and then split 2010 between the Single-A Great Lakes Loons and Double-A Chattanooga Lookouts. Overall, he pitched in 22 games in 2010, with 13 starts and was 7–2 with a 2.37 ERA. He was selected as the Dodgers "Minor League Pitcher of the Year" and given an invite to Major League spring training for 2011. He was assigned back to Chattanooga to start the season, where he was 2–2 with a 2.92 ERA in eight starts for the Lookouts. De La Rosa was selected to the 2011 Southern League All-Star Game, but was unable to participate because he was promoted to the Dodgers.

De La Rosa was called up by the Dodgers on 24 May 2011. He made his debut the same day, pitching a scoreless eighth inning against the Houston Astros, retiring the side in order, including two strikeouts. On 27 May, he recorded his first career major league victory against the Florida Marlins.

On 7 June 2011, De La Rosa made his first career start against the Philadelphia Phillies. He walked five of the first eleven batters he faced but settled down to allow just one run in five innings to pick up the win. He went on to pitch in 13 games for the Dodgers in 2011, including making 10 starts. His record was 4–5 with a 3.71 ERA and 60 strikeouts.

In his last start of the season, on 31 July against the Arizona Diamondbacks, he suffered a tear of the ulnar collateral ligament while throwing a 94-mph fastball to Miguel Montero. After the game, he was placed on the disabled list. The Dodgers then announced that he would undergo Tommy John surgery and be sidelined for up to a year.

After a long recovery period and a few minor league appearances, De La Rosa finally rejoined the Dodgers on 21 August 2012. He pitched in one game for the Dodgers before being optioned back to the minors.

=== Boston Red Sox ===
On 4 October 2012, the Dodgers traded De La Rosa and Jerry Sands to the Boston Red Sox to complete the 25 August 2012, trade of Carl Crawford, Josh Beckett, Adrián González, Nick Punto and $11 million in cash in exchange for James Loney, Iván DeJesús, Jr., Allen Webster and two players to be named later: Sands and De La Rosa.

On 3 August 2013, De La Rosa was called up to the Red Sox. He made 11 appearances, going 0–2 with a 5.56 ERA and six strikeouts across 11 1/3 innings pitched.

On 31 May 2014, De La Rosa was called up to make a start against the Tampa Bay Rays for the injured starter Clay Buchholz. De La Rosa went seven strong innings against the Rays, giving up four hits, no runs allowed, and striking out eight batters. On 16 June, De La Rosa matched his previous outing at Fenway, throwing seven innings of one-hit ball as the Red Sox beat the Minnesota Twins by a score of 1–0.

=== Arizona Diamondbacks ===
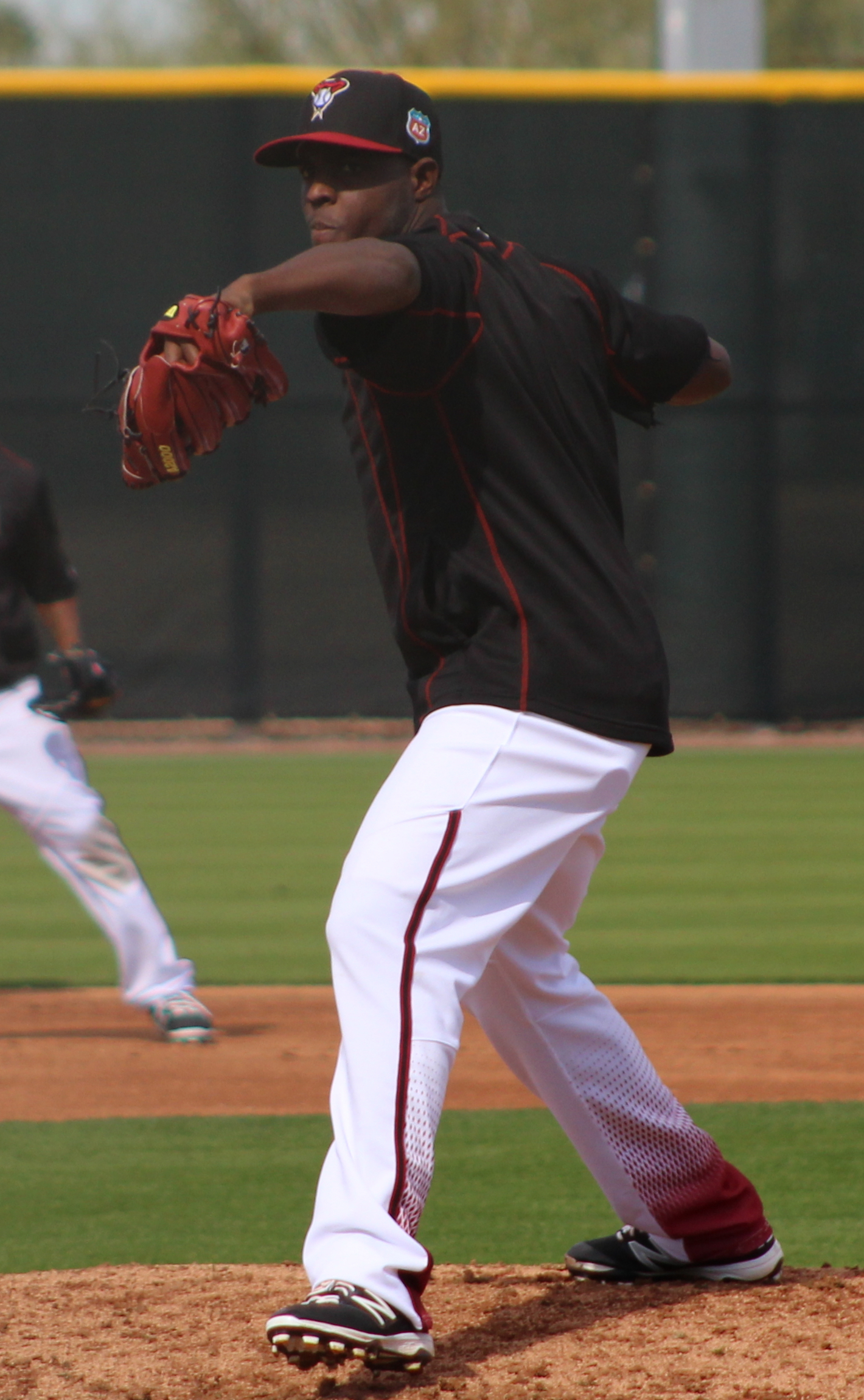
De La Rosa with the Diamondbacks in 2016

On 12 December 2014, the Red Sox traded De La Rosa, Allen Webster, and Raymel Flores to the Arizona Diamondbacks in exchange for Wade Miley. After an open competition in spring training, De La Rosa won one of the opening rotation spots and remained their most consistent starter throughout the season, leading the team in every pitching category except in ERA.

In 2016, De La Rosa opened the season in the Diamondbacks' rotation but suffered elbow injuries all year. In September, the team elected to end De La Rosa's season early. He was non-tendered by Arizona on 2 December 2016.

On 3 January 2017, De La Rosa and the Diamondbacks agreed to a minor league contract. On 23 June, De La Rosa's contract was selected from the Triple-A Reno Aces. In August, it was determined that he needed a second Tommy John surgery after suffering an injury. He was released by the Diamondbacks on 1 September. De La Rosa re-signed with Arizona on a two-year minor league contract on 7 November.

On 20 June 2019, he was granted his release by the Diamondbacks to play in Japan.

=== Yomiuri Giants ===
On 27 June 2019, he signed with the Yomiuri Giants of Nippon Professional Baseball (NPB). De La Rosa made 26 appearances for Yomiuri on the year, recording a 2.49 ERA with 29 strikeouts in 21 2/3 innings pitched. On 26 November 2019, De La Rosa signed a one-year extension to remain with the Giants. For the 2020 season, De La Rosa pitched in 36 games for the Giants, logging a 2.48 ERA, almost identical to his 2019 ERA, and striking out the same amount of batters as the previous year (29) in 32 2/3 innings pitched.

In 2021, De La Rosa saw action in 46 contests for the club, pitching to a 2.64 ERA and striking out 39 in 41 1/3 innings of work. On 26 March 2022, in his second appearance of the year, De La Rosa entered a game against the Chunichi Dragons in the 9th inning and surrendered an earned run which enabled the Dragons to comeback and win the game in the tenth inning. The following day, he was demoted to the farm team. On the year, De La Rosa recorded a 2.30 ERA with 24 strikeouts in 27 1/3 innings pitched across 30 appearances for the Giants.

=== Los Angeles Dodgers (second stint) ===
On 9 February 2023, De La Rosa signed a minor league contract with the Los Angeles Dodgers organization. De La Rosa was released by Los Angeles on 14 April.
