= 2015 Los Angeles Angels season =

Major League Baseball season

2015 Los Angeles Angels
- League: American League
- Division: West
- Ballpark: Angel Stadium
- City: Anaheim, California
- Record: 85–77 (.525)
- Divisional place: 3rd
- Owner: Arte Moreno
- General managers: Jerry Dipoto, Bill Stoneman
- Manager: Mike Scioscia
- Television: Fox Sports West; KCOP-TV (Victor Rojas, Mark Gubicza, Alex Curry, Amaury Pi-González, José Mota)
- Radio: KLAA (AM 830) KSPN (AM 710) (Terry Smith, Mark Langston, José Mota, Rolando Nichols) Spanish: KWKW (AM 1330)
- Stats: ESPN.com; Baseball Reference

The 2015 Los Angeles Angels season was the franchise's 55th season and 50th in Anaheim (all of them at Angel Stadium). As of 2026, this remains the Angels last winning season.

== Offseason ==
October 30: Joe Thatcher, John McDonald, and Jason Grilli become free agents.

- Grilli signed with the Atlanta Braves.

November 5: Received Carlos Pérez and Nick Tropeano from the Houston Astros for Hank Conger. Also traded Mark Sappington to the Tampa Bay Rays for Cesar Ramos.

November 11: Signed Raywilly Gomez to a minor league contract.

November 12: Signed Jeremy McBryde.

November 20: Sent 3 players to the minors while promoting 2 others. Received Daniel Robertson from the Texas Rangers for cash.

November 23: Signed Brian Broderick.

November 24: Signed 3 players to a minor league contract and invited them to spring training.

November 27: Signed D'Arby Myers to a minor league contract and invited him to spring training.

December 2: Yoslan Herrera, Wade LeBlanc, and Gordon Beckham become free agents.

- Beckham returned to the Chicago White Sox.

December 4 and December 5: Signed 3 players to a minor league contract and invited them to spring training.

December 8: Claimed Marc Krauss off waiver from the Houston Astros.

- He would be sent to the minors.

December 9: Received Drew Butera from the Los Angeles Dodgers for Matt Long.

December 11: Three trades were made this day:

- Received Taylor Featherston from the Chicago Cubs for cash.
- Received Andrew Heaney from the Dodgers for Howie Kendrick.
- Received Josh Rutledge from the Colorado Rockies for Jairo Diaz.

December 16: Received Matt Joyce from the Tampa Bay Rays for Kevin Jepsen.

December 19: Received Johnny Giavotella from the Kansas City Royals for Brian Broderick, while releasing Shawn O'Malley and signing Roberto Baldoquin to a minor league contract.

December 23: Signed 2 players to a minor league contract with an invite to Spring training while inviting 8 others to Spring training.

January 4: Signed Steven Hensley to a minor league contract.

January 8: Received Kyle Kubitza and Nate Hyatt from the Kansas City Royals for Ricardo Sanchez.

January 20: Signed Ryan Mattheus to a minor league contract.

January 30: Signed 2 players to a minor league contract.

February 3: Signed Jeff Malm to a minor league contract.

February 4: Sent Yency Almonte to the Chicago White Sox.

== Standings ==
=== Season standings ===
==== American League West ====
AL West
Team	W	L	Pct.	GB	Home	Road
Texas Rangers	88	74	.543	—	43‍–‍38	45‍–‍36
Houston Astros	86	76	.531	2	53‍–‍28	33‍–‍48
Los Angeles Angels	85	77	.525	3	49‍–‍32	36‍–‍45
Seattle Mariners	76	86	.469	12	36‍–‍45	40‍–‍41
Oakland Athletics	68	94	.420	20	34‍–‍47	34‍–‍47

==== American League leaders ====
Division leaders
Team	W	L	Pct.
Kansas City Royals	95	67	.586
Toronto Blue Jays	93	69	.574
Texas Rangers	88	74	.543

Wild Card teams (Top 2 teams qualify for postseason)
Team	W	L	Pct.	GB
New York Yankees	87	75	.537	+1
Houston Astros	86	76	.531	—
Los Angeles Angels	85	77	.525	1
Minnesota Twins	83	79	.512	3
Cleveland Indians	81	80	.503	4½
Baltimore Orioles	81	81	.500	5
Tampa Bay Rays	80	82	.494	6
Boston Red Sox	78	84	.481	8
Chicago White Sox	76	86	.469	10
Seattle Mariners	76	86	.469	10
Detroit Tigers	74	87	.460	11½
Oakland Athletics	68	94	.420	18

==== Record against opponents ====
2015 American League record Source: MLB Standings Grid – 2015
Team	BAL	BOS	CWS	CLE	DET	HOU	KC	LAA	MIN	NYY	OAK	SEA	TB	TEX	TOR	NL
Baltimore	—	11–8	3–3	5–1	4–3	3–4	3–4	2–4	0–7	10–9	6–1	3–3	10–9	1–6	8–11	12–8
Boston	8–11	—	3–4	2–4	4–2	2–4	4–3	2–5	2–5	8–11	5–1	4–3	9–10	2–5	10–9	13–7
Chicago	3–3	4–3	—	10–9	9–10	5–1	7–12	4–3	6–13	2–5	5–2	4–3	1–5	3–3	4–3	9–11
Cleveland	1–5	4–2	9–10	—	7–11	5–2	9–10	4–2	7–12	5–2	3–4	4–3	5–2	3–3	3–4	12–8
Detroit	3–4	2–4	10–9	11–7	—	3–4	9–10	1–6	11–8	2–5	2–4	4–3	3–3	2–5	2–4	9–11
Houston	4–3	4–2	1–5	2–5	4–3	—	4–2	10–9	3–3	4–3	10–9	12–7	2–5	6–13	4–3	16–4
Kansas City	4–3	3–4	12–7	10–9	10–9	2–4	—	6–1	12–7	2–4	5–1	4–2	6–1	3–4	3–4	13–7
Los Angeles	4–2	5–2	3–4	2–4	6–1	9–10	1–6	—	5–2	2–4	11–8	12–7	3–3	12–7	2–5	8–12
Minnesota	7–0	5–2	13–6	12–7	8–11	3–3	7–12	2–5	—	1–5	4–3	4–3	4–2	3–3	2–5	8–12
New York	9–10	11–8	5–2	2–5	5–2	3–4	4–2	4–2	5–1	—	3–4	5–1	12–7	2–5	6–13	11–9
Oakland	1–6	1–5	2–5	4–3	4–2	9–10	1–5	8–11	3–4	4–3	—	6–13	3–4	10–9	1–5	11–9
Seattle	3–3	3–4	3–4	3–4	3–4	7–12	2–4	7–12	3–4	1–5	13–6	—	4–3	12–7	4–2	8–12
Tampa Bay	9–10	10–9	5–1	2–5	3–3	5–2	1–6	3–3	2–4	7–12	4–3	3–4	—	2–5	10–9	14–6
Texas	6–1	5–2	3–3	3–3	5–2	13–6	4–3	7–12	3–3	5–2	9–10	7–12	5–2	—	2–4	11–9
Toronto	11–8	9–10	3–4	4–3	4–2	3–4	4–3	5–2	5–2	13–6	5–1	2–4	9–10	4–2	—	12–8

== Season summary ==
From the start of the season the Angels battled the Astros for the division title. They were in second place for the majority of the season between Astros (1st) and Rangers (3rd).

In early July, the baseball world focused their attention on the Angels following a report from Ken Rosenthal that general manager Jerry DiPoto and manager Mike Scioscia were at odds over the use of analytics in the clubhouse. Two days later, DiPoto cleaned out his Angels office and resigned.

Former Angels general manager Bill Stoneman, who hired Scioscia before the 2000 season, was named interim GM.

In July, the Angels briefly held first place in the AL West before losing 19 games in August.

== The deciding game ==
On October 4, 2015, the final game of the season for the Angels and Rangers, the Angels lost against the Rangers, preventing them from entering the playoffs. If they had won, they would have entered a tiebreaker game with the Astros. If that was won, they would have entered the wild card game against the Yankees.

== Game log ==
2015 Game Log (85–77)
April: 11–11 (Home: 4–6; Away: 7–5)

#	Date	Opponent	Score	Win	Loss	Save	Attendance	Record
1	April 6	@ Mariners	1–4	Hernández (1–0)	**Weaver** (0–1)	Rodney (1)	45,909	0–1
2	April 7	@ Mariners	2–0	**Wilson** (1–0)	Paxton (0–1)	**Street** (1)	26,545	1–1
3	April 8	@ Mariners	5–3	**Shoemaker** (1–0)	Iwakuma (0–1)	**Street** (2)	25,495	2–1
4	April 10	Royals	2–4	Vargas (1–0)	**Santiago** (0–1)	Davis (1)	44,489	2–2
5	April 11	Royals	4–6	Guthrie (1–0)	**Weaver** (0–2)	Holland (3)	44,154	2–3
6	April 12	Royals	2–9	Ventura (2–0)	**Wilson** (1–1)	—	37,060	2–4
7	April 13	@ Rangers	6–3	**Shoemaker** (2–0)	Detwiler (0–2)	**Street** (3)	18,401	3–4
8	April 14	@ Rangers	2–8	Martinez (2–0)	**Rucinski** (0–1)	—	21,805	3–5
9	April 15	@ Rangers	10–2	**Santiago** (1–1)	Ranaudo (0–1)	—	25,757	4–5
10	April 17	@ Astros	6–3	**Ramos** (1–0)	Qualls (0–1)	**Street** (4)	22,660	5–5
11	April 18	@ Astros	0–4	Keuchel (2–0)	**Wilson** (1–2)	—	28,209	5–6
12	April 19	@ Astros	3–4	Feldman (1–2)	**Richards** (0–1)	Gregerson (2)	24,254	5–7
13	April 20	Athletics	3–6	Otero (1–1)	**Shoemaker** (2–1)	Clippard (1)	35,228	5–8
14	April 21	Athletics	14–1	**Santiago** (2–1)	Pomeranz (1–2)	—	32,137	6–8
15	April 22	Athletics	2–9	Gray (2–0)	**Salas** (0–1)	—	30,034	6–9
16	April 23	Athletics	2–0	**Tropeano** (1–0)	Chavez (0–1)	**Street** (5)	24,304	7–9
17	April 24	Rangers	3–2	**Richards** (1–1)	Kela (0–1)	**Street** (6)	41,054	8–9
18	April 25	Rangers	4–1	**Pestano** (1–0)	Lewis (1–2)	**Street** (7)	38,016	9–9
19	April 26	Rangers	1–2 (11)	Feliz (1–1)	**Álvarez** (0–1)	—	35,053	9–10
20	April 28	@ Athletics	2–6	Gray (3–0)	**Weaver** (0–3)	—	17,674	9–11
21	April 29	@ Athletics	6–3	**Morin** (1–0)	Cook (0–1)	**Street** (8)	16,212	10–11
22	April 30	@ Athletics	6–5	**Richards** (2–1)	Chavez (0–2)	**Street** (9)	19,534	11–11

May: 16–13 (Home: 11–5; Away: 5–8 )

#	Date	Opponent	Score	Win	Loss	Save	Attendance	Record
23	May 1	@ Giants	2–3	Casilla (3–0)	**Smith** (0–1)	—	41,507	11–12
24	May 2	@ Giants	4–5	Hudson (1–2)	**Santiago** (2–2)	Casilla (7)	41,287	11–13
25	May 3	@ Giants	0–5	Lincecum (2–2)	**Weaver** (0–4)	—	41,516	11–14
26	May 4	Mariners	2–3	Hernández (5–0)	**Shoemaker** (2–2)	Rodney (8)	25,024	11–15
27	May 5	Mariners	5–4	**Street** (1–0)	Leone (0–3)	—	33,394	12–15
28	May 6	Mariners	4–3	**Street** (2–0)	Smith (0–2)	—	25,160	13–15
29	May 7	Astros	2–3	Neshek (3–0)	**Street** (2–1)	Gregerson (7)	25,097	13–16
30	May 8	Astros	2–0	**Weaver** (1–4)	Hernández (1–3)	—	40,006	14–16
31	May 9	Astros	5–6	Keuchel (4–0)	**Shoemaker** (2–3)	Qualls (3)	40,210	14–17
32	May 10	Astros	3–1	**Richards** (3–1)	Feldman (2–4)	**Street** (10)	30,929	15–17
33	May 12	Rockies	5–2	**Wilson** (2–2)	Betancourt (0–1)	**Street** (11)	28,150	16–17
34	May 13	Rockies	2–1 (11)	**Ramos** (2–0)	Friedrich (0–1)	—	30,129	17–17
35	May 15	@ Orioles	3–1	**Weaver** (2–4)	Chen (1–2)	**Street** (12)	35,470	18–17
36	May 16	@ Orioles	6–1	**Shoemaker** (3–3)	Jiménez (3–3)	—	29,102	19–17
37	May 17	@ Orioles	0–3	Wright (1–0)	**Richards** (4–2)	Britton (8)	41,733	19–18
38	May 18	@ Blue Jays	6–10	Osuna (1–0)	**Morin** (1–1)	—	29,306	19–19
39	May 19	@ Blue Jays	3–2	**Santiago** (3–2)	Sanchez (3–4)	**Street** (13)	15,062	20–19
40	May 20	@ Blue Jays	4–3	**Weaver** (3–4)	Hutchison (3–1)	**Street** (14)	16,402	21–19
41	May 21	@ Blue Jays	4–8	Dickey (2–5)	**Shoemaker** (3–4)	—	19,014	21–20
42	May 22	@ Red Sox	12–5	**Richards** (4–2)	Porcello (4–3)	—	36,150	22–20
43	May 23	@ Red Sox	3–8	Wright (2–1)	**Wilson** (2–3)	—	37,735	22–21
44	May 24	@ Red Sox	1–6	Miley (4–4)	**Santiago** (3–3)	—	37,742	22–22
45	May 25	Padres	4–3	**Smith** (1–1)	Quackenbush (1–1)	—	38,055	23–22
46	May 26	Padres	0–4	Thayer (1–0)	**Smith** (1–2)	—	32,334	23–23
47	May 27	Padres	4–5	Cashner (2–7)	**Richards** (4–3)	Kimbrel (12)	36,180	23–24
48	May 28	Tigers	12–2	**Wilson** (3–3)	Farmer (0–1)	—	32,261	24–24
49	May 29	Tigers	2–0	**Santiago** (4–3)	Sánchez (3–6)	**Street** (15)	41,901	25–24
50	May 30	Tigers	8–6	**Weaver** (4–4)	Greene (4–4)	**Street** (16)	40,369	26–24
51	May 31	Tigers	4–2	**Smith** (2–2)	Price (4–2)	**Street** (17)	37,143	27–24

June: 14–13 (Home: 10–6; Away: 4–7 )

#	Date	Opponent	Score	Win	Loss	Save	Attendance	Record
52	June 1	Rays	7–3	**Richards** (5–3)	Colomé (3–2)	—	27,078	28–24
53	June 2	Rays	1–6	Archer (6–4)	**Wilson** (3–4)	—	28,771	28–25
54	June 3	Rays	5–6 (10)	Boxberger (3–3)	**Street** (2–2)	Geltz (2)	28,245	28–26
55	June 5	@ Yankees	7–8	Eovaldi (5–1)	**Weaver** (4–5)	Betances (2)	40,310	28–27
56	June 6	@ Yankees	2–8	Warren (4–4)	**Richards** (5–4)	—	40,096	28–28
57	June 7	@ Yankees	2–6	Sabathia (3–7)	**Wilson** (3–5)	—	43,178	28–29
58	June 9	@ Rays	8–2	**Shoemaker** (4–4)	Karns (3–3)	—	11,617	29–29
59	June 10	@ Rays	2–4	Ramírez (5–2)	**Weaver** (4–6)	McGee (1)	10,088	29–30
60	June 11	@ Rays	6–2	**Richards** (6–4)	Jepsen (1–4)	—	10,779	30–30
61	June 12	Athletics	5–4	**Álvarez** (1–1)	Scribner (1–1)	**Street** (18)	42,113	31–30
62	June 13	Athletics	1–0	**Wilson** (4–5)	Graveman (3–3)	**Street** (19)	43,548	32–30
63	June 14	Athletics	1–8	Gray (8–3)	**Shoemaker** (4–5)	—	35,143	32–31
64	June 15	D-backs	3–7	Ray (2–1)	**Weaver** (4–7)	Reed (3)	35,193	32–32
65	June 16	D-backs	4–1	**Richards** (7–4)	Hellickson (4–4)	**Street** (20)	40,099	33–32
66	June 17	@ D-backs	2–3	Anderson (3–1)	**Santiago** (4–4)	Ziegler (9)	28,481	33–33
67	June 18	@ D-backs	7–1	**Wilson** (5–5)	Webster (1–1)	—	28,942	34–33
68	June 19	@ Athletics	12–7	**Salas** (1–1)	Mujica (2–2)	—	25,528	35–33
69	June 20	@ Athletics	1–4	Hahn (5–5)	**Weaver** (4–8)	Clippard (11)	26,471	35–34
70	June 21	@ Athletics	2–3	Kazmir (4–4)	**Richards** (7–5)	Clippard (12)	29,137	35–35
71	June 22	Astros	4–3	**Street** (3–2)	Qualls (1–4)	—	34,153	36–35
72	June 23	Astros	3–13	McHugh (8–3)	**Wilson** (5–6)	—	41,208	36–36
73	June 24	Astros	2–1	**Álvarez** (2–1)	Thatcher (1–2)	—	33,543	37–36
74	June 26	Mariners	1–3	Walker (6–6)	**Shoemaker** (4–6)	–	41,137	37–37
75	June 27	Mariners	4–2	**Richards** (8–5)	Happ (3–5)	Street (21)	40,514	38–37
76	June 28	Mariners	3–2	**Gott** (1–0)	Wilhelmsen (1–2)	—	38,387	39–37
77	June 29	Yankees	4–1	**Wilson** (6–6)	Sabathia (3–8)	Street (22)	42,056	40–37
78	June 30	Yankees	2–1	**Heaney** (1–0)	Nova (1–1)	Street (23)	42,036	41–37

July: 14–10 (Home: 7–5; Away: 7–3 )

#	Date	Opponent	Score	Win	Loss	Save	Attendance	Record
79	July 1	Yankees	1–3	Eovaldi (8–2)	**Shoemaker** (4–7)	—	40,938	41–38
80	July 3	@ Rangers	8–2	**Richards** (9–5)	Gonzalez (2–4)	—	39,320	42–38
81	July 4	@ Rangers	13–0	**Santiago** (5–4)	Rodríguez (5–4)	—	47,877	43–38
82	July 5	@ Rangers	12–6	**Wilson** (7–6)	Lewis (8–4)	—	26,638	44–38
83	July 7	@ Rockies	10–2	**Heaney** (2–0)	Bettis (4–4)	—	26,232	45–38
84	July 8	@ Rockies	3–2	**Smith** (3–2)	Axford (1–2)	Street (24)	24,660	46–38
85	July 9	@ Mariners	2–7	Hernández (11–5)	**Richards** (9–6)	—	28,131	46–39
86	July 10	@ Mariners	7–3	**Santiago** (6–4)	Montgomery (4–3)	—	29,679	47–39
87	July 11	@ Mariners	0–5	Iwakuma (1–1)	**Wilson** (7–7)	—	40,765	47–40
88	July 12	@ Mariners	10–3	**Heaney** (3–0)	Walker (7–7)	—	36,955	48–40
ASG	July 14	AL @ NL; Cincinnati, OH	6–3 AL	Price (AL, DET) (6–2)	Kershaw (NL, LAD) (5–3)	—	43,656	—N/a
89	July 17	Red Sox	1–0	**Smith** (4–2)	Uehara (2–4)	—	43,234	49–40
90	July 18	Red Sox	3–0	**Richards** (10–6)	Porcello (5–10)	—	43,631	50–40
91	July 19	Red Sox	11–1	**Santiago** (7–4)	Rodríguez (5–3)	—		51–40
92	July 20	Red Sox	7–3	**Heaney** (4–0)	Wright (3–3)	**Smith** (1)	38,042	52–40
93	July 21	Twins	7–0	**Shoemaker** (5–7)	Gibson (8–7)	—	38,937	53–40
94	July 22	Twins	5–2	**Wilson** (8–7)	Pelfrey (5–7)	**Street** (25)	40,239	54–40
95	July 23	Twins	2–3	Santana (2–0)	**Richards** (10–7)	Perkins (29)	36,134	54–41
96	July 24	Rangers	2–4	Lewis (10–4)	**Tropeano** (1–1)	Tolleson (16)	42,046	54–42
97	July 25	Rangers	6–7	Patton (1–0)	**Smith** (4–3)	Tolleson (17)	43,052	54–43
98	July 26	Rangers	13–7	**Heaney** (5–0)	Martinez (5–6)	—	38,539	55–43
99	July 28	@ Astros	5–10	McHugh (12–5)	**Wilson** (8–8)	—	24,031	55–44
100	July 29	@ Astros	3–6	McCullers (5–3)	**Richards** (10–8)	—	31,272	55-45
101	July 30	@ Astros	0–3	Gregerson (4–1)	**Álvarez** (2–2)	—	27,598	55-46
102	July 31	@ Dodgers	3–5	Greinke (10–2)	**Santiago** (7–5)	—	53,380	55–47

August: 10–19 (Home: 7–6; Away: 3–13 )

#	Date	Opponent	Score	Win	Loss	Save	Attendance	Record
103	August 1	@ Dodgers	1–3	Kershaw (9–6)	**Heaney** (5–1)	—	52,979	55–48
104	August 2	@ Dodgers	3–5	Báez (4–2)	**Rucinski** (0–2)	—	52,116	55–49
105	August 3	Indians	5–4	**Richards** (11–8)	Kluber (6–12)	—	37,030	56–49
106	August 4	Indians	0–2	McAllister (3–3)	**Álvarez** (2–3)	—	38,159	56–50
107	August 5	Indians	4–3	**Bedrosian** (1–0)	Allen (1–4)	—	33,099	57–50
108	August 7	Orioles	8–4	**Salas** (2–1)	Gausman (2–3)	—	42,578	58–50
109	August 8	Orioles	0–5	Jiménez (9–7)	**Richards** (11–9)	—	43,041	58–51
110	August 9	Orioles	5–4 (11)	**Gott** (2–0)	Roe (2–2)	—	37,154	59–51
111	August 10	@ White Sox	2–8	Sale (10–7)	**Shoemaker** (5–8)			59–52
112	August 11	@ White Sox	0–3	Rodon (5–4)	**Santiago** (7–6)	Robertson (23)	17,137	59–53
113	August 12	@ White Sox	2–3	Albers (2–0)	**Ramos** (2–1)	—	17,171	59–54
114	August 13	@ Royals	7–6	**Álvarez** (3–3)	Holland (3–1)	**Street** (27)	32,098	60–54
115	August 14	@ Royals	1–4	Duffy (6–5)	**Weaver** (4–9)	Holland (26)	36,926	60–55
116	August 15	@ Royals	4–9	Cueto (9–7)	**Shoemaker** (5–9)	—	39,251	60–56
117	August 16	@ Royals	3–4	Herrera (4–2)	**Gott** (2–1)	—	36,845	60–57
118	August 17	White Sox	2–1	**Salas** (3–1)	Rodon (5–5)	**Street** (28)	36,431	61–57
119	August 18	White Sox	5–3	**Richards** (12–9)	Danks (6–10)	**Street** (29)	37,114	62–57
120	August 19	White Sox	1–0	**Weaver** (5–9)	Samardzija (8–9)	**Smith** (2)	35,036	63–57
121	August 20	White Sox	2–8	Quintana (7–10)	**Tropeano** (1–2)	—	37,142	63–58
122	August 21	Blue Jays	2–9	Price (12–4)	**Santiago** (7–7)	—	41,110	63–59
123	August 22	Blue Jays	3–15	Estrada (11–7)	**Heaney** (5–2)	—	42,578	63–60
124	August 23	Blue Jays	5–12	Dickey (8–10)	**Richards** (12–10)	—	37,060	63–61
125	August 25	@ Tigers	8–7	**Weaver** (6–9)	Simón (11–8)	**Street** (30)	33,649	64–61
126	August 26	@ Tigers	0–5	Verlander (2–6)	**Santiago** (7–8)	—	31,938	64–62
127	August 27	@ Tigers	2–0	**Shoemaker** (6–9)	Wolf (0–2)	**Street** (31)	36,198	65–62
128	August 28	@ Indians	1–3	Bauer (10–10)	**Gott** (2–2)	Allen (27)	22,273	65–63
129	August 29	@ Indians	3–8	Shaw (3–2)	**Smith** (4–4)	—	22,843	65–64
130	August 30	@ Indians	2–9	Tomlin (3–1)	**Weaver** (6–10)	—	22,328	65–65
131	August 31	@ Athletics	5–11	Doubront (2–1)	**Santiago** (7–9)	—	12,054	65–66

September: 18–9 (Home: 10–5; Away: 8–4 )

#	Date	Opponent	Score	Win	Loss	Save	Attendance	Record
132	September 1	@ Athletics	6–2	**Shoemaker** (7–9)	Martin (2–4)	—	14,178	66–66
133	September 2	@ Athletics	9–4	**Heaney** (6–2)	Gray (12–7)	—	13,392	67–66
134	September 4	Rangers	5–2	**Richards** (13–10)	Pérez (2–4)	**Street** (32)	37,073	68–66
135	September 5	Rangers	1–2	Holland (3–1)	**Smith** (4–5)	Tolleson (29)	39,889	68–67
136	September 6	Rangers	7–0	**Santiago** (8–9)	Lewis (14–8)	—	38,367	69–67
137	September 7	Dodgers	5–7	Greinke (16–3)	**Salas** (3–2)	Jansen (30)	44,488	69–68
138	September 8	Dodgers	4–6	Kershaw (13–6)	**Heaney** (6–3)	Jansen (31)	41,086	69–69
139	September 9	Dodgers	3–2	**Álvarez** (4–3)	Avilán (2–5)	**Street** (33)	42,799	70–69
140	September 11	Astros	3–2	**Weaver** (7–10)	Keuchel (17–7)	**Street** (34)	39,636	71–69
141	September 12	Astros	3–2	**Smith** (5–5)	Harris (5–3)	**Street** (35)	41,130	72–69
142	September 13	Astros	3–5	Qualls (2–4)	**Street** (3–3)	Gregerson (27)	41,550	72–70
143	September 14	@ Mariners	1–10	Walker (11–8)	**Richards** (13–11)	—	13,681	72–71
144	September 15	@ Mariners	4–3	**Tropeano** (2–2)	Hernández (17–9)	**Smith** (3)	15,365	73–71
145	September 16	@ Mariners	1–3	Iwakuma (8–4)	**Weaver** (7–11)	Wilhelmsen (11)	16,176	73–72
146	September 17	@ Twins	11–8	**Morin** (2–1)	Achter (0–1)	**Street** (36)	18,697	74–72
–	September 18	@ Twins	Postponed (rain) Made up as a doubleheader on September 19					
147	September 19	@ Twins	4–3 (12)	**Morin** (3–1)	Boyer (3–5)	**Street** (37)	22,878	75–72
148	September 19	@ Twins	5–2	**Richards** (14–11)	Pelfrey (6–10)	**Street** (38)	33,300	76–72
149	September 20	@ Twins	1–8	Duffey (4–1)	**Shoemaker** (7–10)	—	25,302	76–73
150	September 21	@ Astros	3–6	Keuchel (18–8)	**Weaver** (7–12)	Gregerson (28)	25,318	76–74
151	September 22	@ Astros	4–3	**Santiago** (9–9)	McCullers (5–7)	**Street** (39)	25,671	77–74
152	September 23	@ Astros	6–5	**Gott** (3–2)	Harris (5–5)	**Street** (40)	25,573	78–74
153	September 25	Mariners	8–4	**Richards** (15–11)	Nuño (1–4)	—	38,355	79–74
154	September 26	Mariners	3–2	**Salas** (4–2)	Farquhar (1–5)	—	37,866	80–74
155	September 27	Mariners	3–2	**Salas** (5–2)	Iwakuma (9–5)	**Morin** (1)	35,243	81–74
156	September 28	Athletics	5–4	**Gott** (4–2)	Mujica (4–5)	—	31,858	82–74
157	September 29	Athletics	8–1	**Tropeano** (3–2)	Bassitt (1–8)	—	33,470	83–74
158	September 30	Athletics	7–8	Dull (1–1)	**Morin** (3–2)	Doolittle (3)	34,033	83–75

October: 2–2 (Home: 0–0; Away: 2–2 )

#	Date	Opponent	Score	Win	Loss	Save	Attendance	Record
159	October 1	@ Rangers	3–5	Holland (4–3)	**Heaney** (6–4)	Tolleson (35)	32,338	83–76
160	October 2	@ Rangers	2–1	**Morin** (4–2)	Tolleson (6–4)	**Smith** (4)	47,219	84–76
161	October 3	@ Rangers	11–10	**Reyes** (1–0)	Ohlendorf (3–1)	**Smith** (5)	37,271	85–76
162	October 4	@ Rangers	2–9	Hamels (13-8)	**Richards** (15–12)	—	45,772	85–77

Legend: = Win = Loss = Postponement = All-Star Game
Bold = Angels team member

== Roster ==
2015 Los Angeles Angels
Roster
Pitchers: 48 José Álvarez; 68 Cam Bedrosian; 62 Trevor Gott; 28 Andrew Heaney; 66 Edgar Ibarra; 55 Mat Latos; 47 Ryan Mattheus; 64 Mike Morin; 63 Vinnie Pestano; 37 Cesar Ramos; 46 Cory Rasmus; 48 Jo-Jo Reyes; 43 Garrett Richards; 51 Drew Rucinski; 59 Fernando Salas; 53 Hector Santiago; 52 Matt Shoemaker; 38 Joe Smith; 16 Huston Street; 35 Nick Tropeano; 36 Jered Weaver; 49,72 Adam Wilk; 33 C. J. Wilson; 40 Wesley Wright	Catchers: 47 Jett Bandy; 3 Drew Butera; 17 Chris Iannetta; 58 Carlos Pérez; Infielders: 2 Erick Aybar; 41 Kaleb Cowart; 24 C. J. Cron; 8 Taylor Featherston; 6 David Freese; 12 Johnny Giavotella; 22 Conor Gillaspie; 10 Grant Green; 32 Ryan Jackson; 39 Marc Krauss; 13,18 Kyle Kubitza; 19,39 Efren Navarro; 5 Albert Pujols	Outfielders: 56 Kole Calhoun; 7 Collin Cowgill; 3 David DeJesus; 20 Matthew Joyce; 57 Alfredo Marte; 19 David Murphy; 22 Kirk Nieuwenhuis; 44 Dan Robertson; 27 Mike Trout; 18 Shane Victorino	Manager: 14 Mike Scioscia; Coaches: 25 Don Baylor (hitting); 78 Keith Johnson (player information); 23 Mike Butcher (pitching); 9 Gary DiSarcina (third base); 21 Dino Ebel (bench); 70 Tom Gregorio (bullpen catcher); 4 Alfredo Griffin (first base); 31 Dave Hansen (assistant hitting); 61 Steve Soliz (bullpen)

== Statistics ==
Through October 4, 2015

=== Batting ===
Note: G = Games played; AB = At bats; R = Runs scored; H = Hits; 2B = Doubles; 3B = Triples; HR = Home runs; RBI = Runs batted in; BB = Base on balls; SO = Strikeouts; AVG = Batting average; SB = Stolen bases

Player	G	AB	R	H	2B	3B	HR	RBI	BB	SO	AVG	SB
Erick Aybar, SS	156	597	74	161	30	1	3	44	25	73	.270	15
Jett Bandy, C	2	2	1	1	0	0	1	1	0	0	.500	0
Drew Butera, C	10	21	3	4	0	0	0	0	0	2	.190	0
Kole Calhoun, RF	159	630	78	161	23	2	26	83	45	164	.256	4
Kaleb Cowart, 3B	34	46	8	8	2	0	1	4	5	19	.174	1
Collin Cowgill, LF	55	69	10	13	2	1	1	2	4	19	.188	2
C. J. Cron, DH, 1B	113	378	37	99	17	1	16	51	17	82	.262	3
David DeJesus, OF	30	56	3	7	1	0	0	4	2	13	.125	0
Taylor Featherston, 3B, SS, 2B	101	154	23	25	5	1	2	9	7	46	.162	4
David Freese, 3B	121	424	53	109	27	0	14	56	31	107	.257	1
Johnny Giavotella, 2B	129	453	51	123	25	5	4	49	32	59	.272	2
Conor Gillaspie, 3B	17	64	4	13	4	1	1	9	4	13	.203	0
Grant Green, 1B, 2B	21	42	6	8	0	0	1	3	2	14	.190	0
Andrew Heaney, P	18	5	0	0	0	0	0	0	0	3	.000	0
Chris Iannetta, C	92	272	28	51	10	0	10	34	41	83	.188	0
Ryan Jackson, IF	22	9	0	0	0	0	0	0	1	5	.000	0
Matt Joyce, LF	93	247	17	43	12	1	5	21	30	67	.174	0
Marc Krauss, DH, 1B	11	35	2	5	2	0	1	5	3	11	.143	0
Kyle Kubitza, 3B, LF	19	36	6	7	0	0	0	1	3	15	.194	0
Alfredo Marte, OF	5	6	0	2	0	0	0	0	1	1	.333	0
David Murphy, LF, DH	48	155	16	41	6	0	5	23	4	20	.265	0
Efren Navarro, OF, 1B	54	83	9	21	4	0	0	5	5	16	.253	0
Kirk Nieuwenhuis, OF	10	22	4	3	2	0	0	1	2	9	.136	0
Carlos Pérez, C	86	260	20	65	13	0	4	21	19	49	.250	2
Albert Pujols, 1B, DH	157	602	85	147	22	0	40	95	50	72	.244	5
Cory Rasmus, P	16	1	0	0	0	0	0	0	0	0	.000	0
Dan Robertson, LF	37	75	10	21	2	0	0	7	2	7	.280	0
Hector Santiago, P	33	5	0	1	0	0	0	0	0	3	.200	0
Matt Shoemaker, P	25	1	0	0	0	0	0	0	1	0	.000	0
Mike Trout, CF	159	575	104	172	32	6	41	90	92	158	.299	11
Shane Victorino, OF	38	84	9	18	2	2	0	3	7	18	.214	2
Jered Weaver, P	26	2	0	0	0	0	0	0	0	1	.000	0
C. J. Wilson, P	21	6	0	2	0	0	0	0	0	1	.333	0
Team totals	162	5417	661	1331	243	21	176	621	435	1150	.246	52

=== Pitching ===
Note: W = Wins; L = Losses; ERA = Earned run average; G = Games pitched; GS = Games started; SV = Saves; IP = Innings pitched; H = Hits allowed; R = Runs allowed; ER = Earned runs allowed; HR = Home runs allowed; BB = Walks allowed; K = Strikeouts

Player	W	L	ERA	G	GS	SV	IP	H	R	ER	HR	BB	K
José Álvarez	4	3	3.49	64	0	0	67.0	58	29	26	5	23	59
Cam Bedrosian	1	0	5.40	34	0	0	33.1	40	20	19	3	19	34
Trevor Gott	4	2	3.02	48	0	0	47.2	43	16	14	2	16	27
Andrew Heaney	6	4	3.49	18	18	0	105.2	99	43	41	9	28	78
Edgar Ibarra	0	0	2.25	2	0	0	4.0	4	1	1	0	3	3
Mat Latos	0	0	4.91	2	0	0	3.2	4	2	2	2	1	3
Ryan Mattheus	0	0	0.00	1	0	0	1.0	0	0	0	0	1	2
Mike Morin	4	2	6.37	47	0	1	35.1	36	26	25	3	9	41
Vinnie Pestano	1	0	5.40	19	0	0	11.2	15	9	7	3	8	13
Cesar Ramos	2	1	2.75	65	0	0	52.1	55	16	16	2	15	43
Cory Rasmus	0	0	5.23	16	1	0	20.2	15	12	12	3	11	27
Jo-Jo Reyes	1	0	0.00	1	0	0	0.1	0	0	0	0	0	0
Garrett Richards	15	12	3.65	32	32	0	207.1	181	90	84	20	76	176
Drew Rucinski	0	2	7.71	4	1	0	7.0	10	6	6	1	6	4
Fernando Salas	2	1	4.15	49	0	0	43.1	37	21	20	5	8	49
Hector Santiago	9	9	3.59	33	32	0	180.2	156	75	72	29	71	162
Matt Shoemaker	7	10	4.46	25	24	0	135.1	135	70	67	24	35	116
Joe Smith	5	5	3.58	70	0	5	65.1	64	26	26	4	19	57
Huston Street	3	3	3.18	62	0	40	62.1	52	22	22	7	20	57
Nick Tropeano	3	2	3.82	8	7	0	37.2	40	16	16	2	10	38
Jered Weaver	7	12	4.64	26	26	0	159.0	163	84	82	24	33	90
Adam Wilk	0	0	4.50	1	0	0	2.0	2	1	1	1	1	2
C. J. Wilson	8	8	3.89	21	21	0	132.0	118	59	57	13	46	110
Wesley Wright	0	0	3.18	9	0	0	5.2	4	3	2	1	3	5
Team totals	85	77	3.94	162	162	46	1440.2	1355	675	630	166	466	1221

== Farm system ==
Level	Team	League	Manager
AAA	Salt Lake Bees	Pacific Coast League	Dave Anderson
AA	Arkansas Travelers	Texas League	Bill Richardson
A-Advanced	Inland Empire 66ers of San Bernardino	California League	Denny Hocking
A	Burlington Bees	Midwest League	Chad Tracy
Rookie	Orem Owlz	Pioneer League	Dave Stapleton
Rookie	AZL Angels	Arizona League	Elio Sarmiento
Rookie	DSL Angels	Dominican Summer League	Carson Vitale

== See also ==
- Los Angeles Angels
- Angel Stadium

Records
Preceded by 2014	Los Angeles Angels seasons 2015	Succeeded by 2016
