= José Rondón =

Venezuelan baseball player (born 1994)

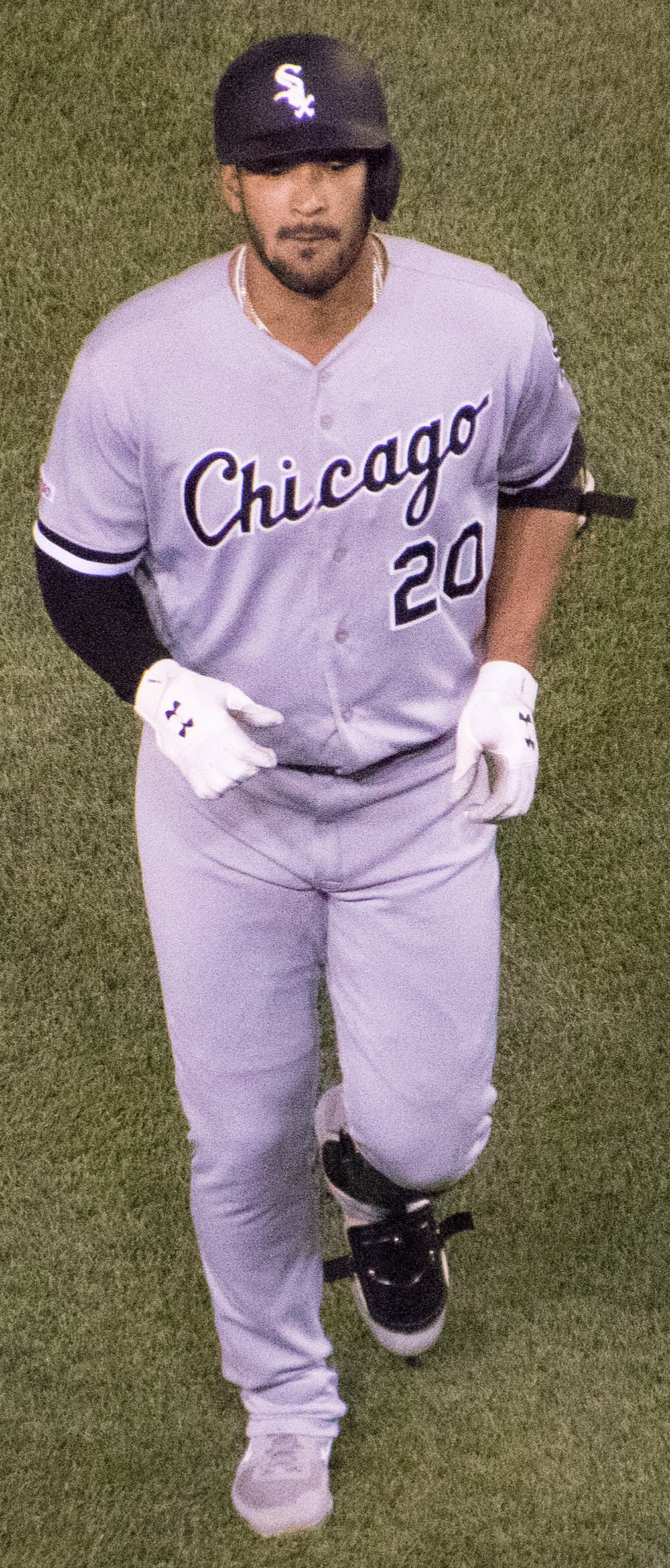
- Rondón with the Chicago White Sox in 2019

Pericos de Puebla – No. 60
- Infielder
- Born: March 3, 1994 (age 32); Villa de Cura, Aragua, Venezuela
- Bats: Right Throws: Right

MLB debut
- July 29, 2016, for the San Diego Padres

MLB statistics (through 2021 season)
- Batting average: .216
- Home runs: 12
- Runs batted in: 33
- Stats at Baseball Reference

Teams
- San Diego Padres (2016); Chicago White Sox (2018–2019); Baltimore Orioles (2019); St. Louis Cardinals (2021)

José Gregorio Rondón Hidalgo (born March 3, 1994) is a Venezuelan professional baseball infielder and outfielder for the Pericos de Puebla of the Mexican League. He has previously played in Major League Baseball (MLB) for the San Diego Padres, Chicago White Sox, Baltimore Orioles, and St. Louis Cardinals.

== Career ==
=== Los Angeles Angels ===
Rondón was signed by the Los Angeles Angels of Anaheim as an international free agent on January 13, 2011. He made his professional debut that season with the Dominican Summer League Angels. He started 2014 with the Inland Empire 66ers. In July he played in the All-Star Futures Game as an injury replacement for Carlos Correa.

=== San Diego Padres ===
On July 31, 2014, Rondón, along with Taylor Lindsey, R. J. Alvarez and Elliot Morris, was traded to the San Diego Padres for Huston Street and Trevor Gott. The Padres assigned him to the Lake Elsinore Storm.

On November 19, 2015, the Padres added Rondón to their 40-man roster to protect him from the Rule 5 draft. Rondón was called up to the major leagues on July 29, 2016, and he made his major league debut that night as a pinch hitter for Edwin Jackson, wearing #13. On January 6, 2018, he was designated for assignment by the Padres.

=== Chicago White Sox ===
On January 10, 2018, Rondón was acquired by the Chicago White Sox. Rondón ended the year playing in 42 games with the White Sox, hitting .230/.280/.470 in 107 plate appearances.

On July 28, 2019, Rondón was designated for assignment. In 2019 with the White Sox, Rondón batted .197/.265/.282 in 156 plate appearances throughout 55 games.

=== Baltimore Orioles ===
On July 30, 2019, Rondón was claimed off waivers by the Baltimore Orioles. He received only one at bat for the Orioles against Toronto Blue Jays pitcher Buddy Boshers, and popped out to catcher Danny Jansen. Rondón was designated for assignment following the acquisition of Ty Blach on August 3. He cleared waivers and was sent outright to the Triple–A Norfolk Tides on August 7.

Rondón did not play in a game in 2020 due to the cancellation of the minor league season because of the COVID-19 pandemic. He became a free agent on November 2, 2020.

=== St. Louis Cardinals ===
On December 18, 2020, Rondón signed a minor league contract with the St. Louis Cardinals organization. On May 29, 2021, Rondón was selected to the active roster. Rondón mostly served as a pinch hitter for St. Louis, batting .308/.349/.564 in that role. On November 30, Rondón was non-tendered by the Cardinals, making him a free agent.

On April 4, 2022, Rondón was suspended by MLB for 80 games after violation of their Joint Drug Prevention and Treatment Program, testing positive for Boldenone.

=== Toros de Tijuana ===
On December 12, 2022, Rondón signed with the Toros de Tijuana of the Mexican League. In 72 games for Tijuana in 2023, Rondón batted .286/.367/.465 with 11 home runs and 41 RBI.

=== Diablos Rojos del México ===
On January 30, 2024, Rondón signed a minor league contract with the New York Mets. He was released on March 11.

On March 13, 2024, Rondón signed with the Diablos Rojos del México of the Mexican League. In 57 games, he slashed .236/.333/.398 with nine home runs and 35 RBI. With the team, Rondón won the Serie del Rey.

Rondón made 58 appearances for México during the 2025 season, hitting .297/.351/.506 with 12 home runs, 47 RBI, and two stolen bases. With the team, he won his second consecutive Serie del Rey. Rondón was released by the Diablos on January 19, 2026.

=== Rieleros de Aguascalientes ===
On March 26, 2026, Rondón signed with the Rieleros de Aguascalientes for the upcoming Mexican League season. In 86 appearances for Aguascalientes, he batted .321/.387/.561 with 15 home runs and 67 RBI.

=== Pericos de Puebla ===
On August 4, 2026, Rondón was traded to the Pericos de Puebla of the Mexican League in exchange for catcher David Rodríguez.

== See also ==
- List of Major League Baseball players from Venezuela
