= R. J. Alvarez =

American baseball player (born 1991)

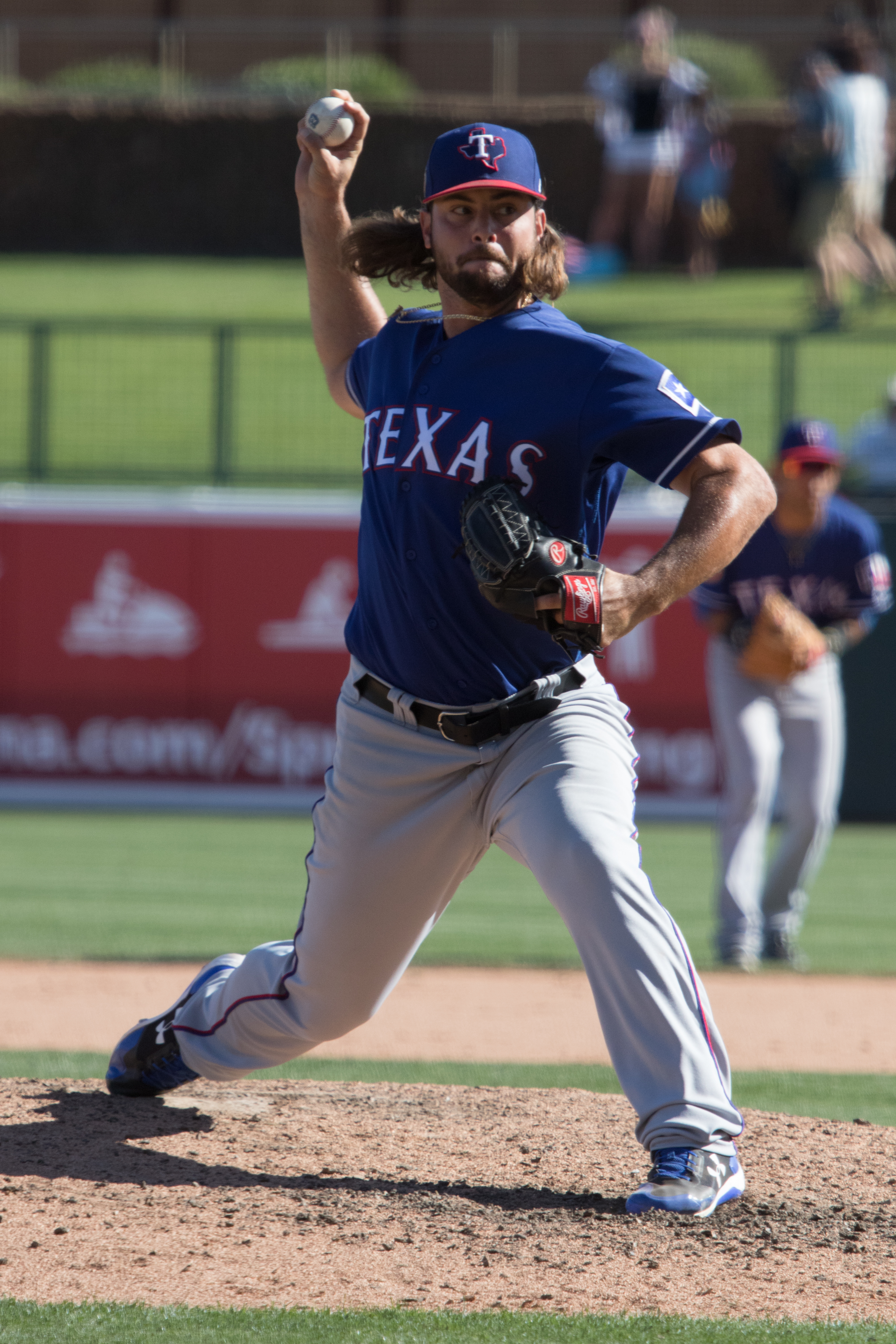
- Alvarez pitching for the Texas Rangers in 2017 spring training
- Pitcher
- Born: June 8, 1991 (age 35); West Palm Beach, Florida, U.S.
- Batted: Right Threw: Right

MLB debut
- September 3, 2014, for the San Diego Padres

Last MLB appearance
- August 16, 2022, for the New York Mets

MLB statistics
- Win–loss record: 0–1
- Earned run average: 7.71
- Strikeouts: 34
- Stats at Baseball Reference

Teams
- San Diego Padres (2014); Oakland Athletics (2015); New York Mets (2022)

Roy Emilio "R.J." Alvarez (born June 8, 1991) is an American former professional baseball pitcher. He played in Major League Baseball (MLB) for the San Diego Padres, Oakland Athletics, and New York Mets.

== Career ==
Alvarez attended Cardinal Newman High School in West Palm Beach, Florida, and Florida Atlantic University, where he played college baseball for the Florida Atlantic Owls. In 2010, he played collegiate summer baseball for the Bourne Braves of the Cape Cod Baseball League, and was named an All-Star. After spending his freshman and sophomore season as a starting pitcher, he was moved to the bullpen before his junior season.

=== Los Angeles Angels ===
Alvarez was drafted by the Los Angeles Angels of Anaheim in the third round of the 2012 Major League Baseball draft. In 2013, he had a 2.96 earned run average with 79 strikeouts over 48 2/3 innings pitched. Prior to the 2014 season, Alvarez was ranked by Baseball America as the Angels fourth best prospect. He started the season with the Arkansas Travelers.

=== San Diego Padres ===
On July 19, 2014, Alvarez was traded to the San Diego Padres with José Rondón, Taylor Lindsey, and Elliot Morris in exchange for Huston Street and Trevor Gott. He was called up to the majors for the first time on September 2, 2014. He made his major league debut on September 3.

=== Oakland Athletics ===
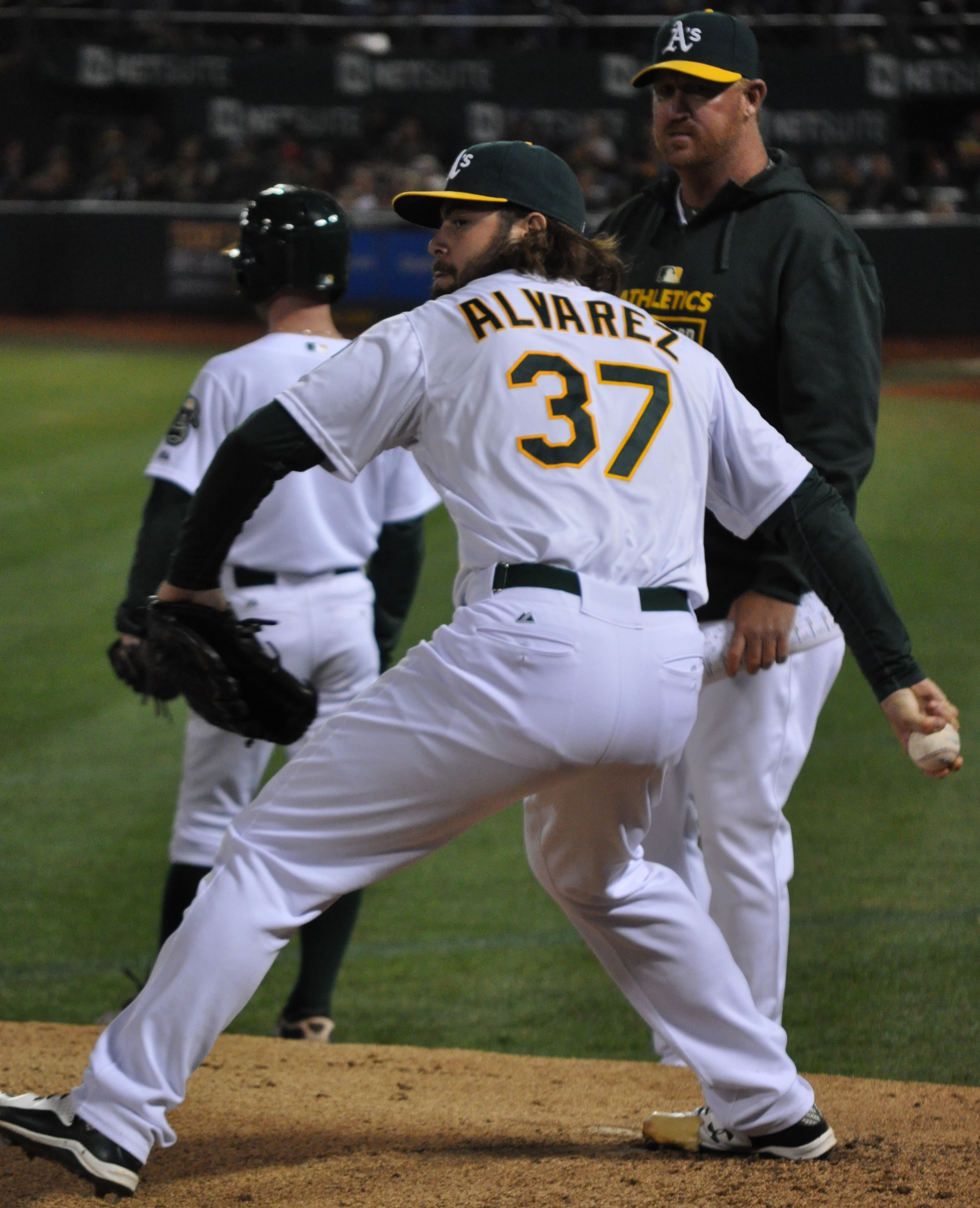
Alvarez warming up in the bullpen for the Oakland Athletics in 2015

On December 18, 2014, the Padres traded Alvarez and Jesse Hahn to the Oakland Athletics for Derek Norris, Seth Streich, and international bonus slot 117. In 21 appearances in 2015, he posted a 9.90 ERA.

=== Chicago Cubs ===
Alvarez was claimed off waivers by Chicago Cubs on June 11, 2016, and was assigned to their Triple–A affiliate, the Iowa Cubs.

=== Texas Rangers ===
On September 10, 2016, Alvarez was claimed off waivers by the Texas Rangers. Two days later, he was removed from the 40–man roster and sent outright to the Triple–A Round Rock Express.

Alvarez spent the 2018 season with Triple–A Round Rock, making 45 appearances out of the bullpen and compiling a 3.68 ERA with 44 strikeouts and 24 saves across 44 innings pitched. He elected free agency following the season on November 2, 2018.

=== Miami Marlins ===
On November 26, 2018, Alvarez signed a minor league contract with the Miami Marlins that included an invitation to spring training. He made 50 relief outings for the Triple–A New Orleans Baby Cakes, compiling a 4.70 ERA with 65 strikeouts and 15 saves across 53 2/3 innings pitched. Alvarez elected free agency following the season on November 4, 2019.

=== Boston Red Sox ===
On December 20, 2019, the Boston Red Sox signed Alvarez to a minor league contract and invited him to spring training. He did not play in a game in 2020 due to the cancellation of the minor league season because of the COVID-19 pandemic. Alvarez was released by the Red Sox organization on August 26, 2020.

=== Milwaukee Brewers ===
On April 4, 2021, Alvarez signed a minor league contract with the Milwaukee Brewers organization.

=== New York Mets ===
On March 1, 2022, Alvarez signed a minor league deal with the New York Mets. On July 1, Alvarez was selected to the 40-man and active rosters after Chris Bassitt was placed on the COVID-19 injured list. He was designated for assignment on July 28, and was sent outright to the Triple–A Syracuse Mets. On August 16, Alvarez's contract was selected by the Mets and promoted to the major league roster. After pitching 2 1/3 innings and giving up 3 earned runs, he was designated for assignment the next day. He cleared waivers and was sent outright to Triple–A Syracuse on August 20. In 40 games with Syracuse, Alvarez registered a 3.55 ERA with 44 strikeouts and 4 saves in 45 2/3 innings pitched. He elected free agency on October 9.
