= Taylor Lindsey =

American baseball player

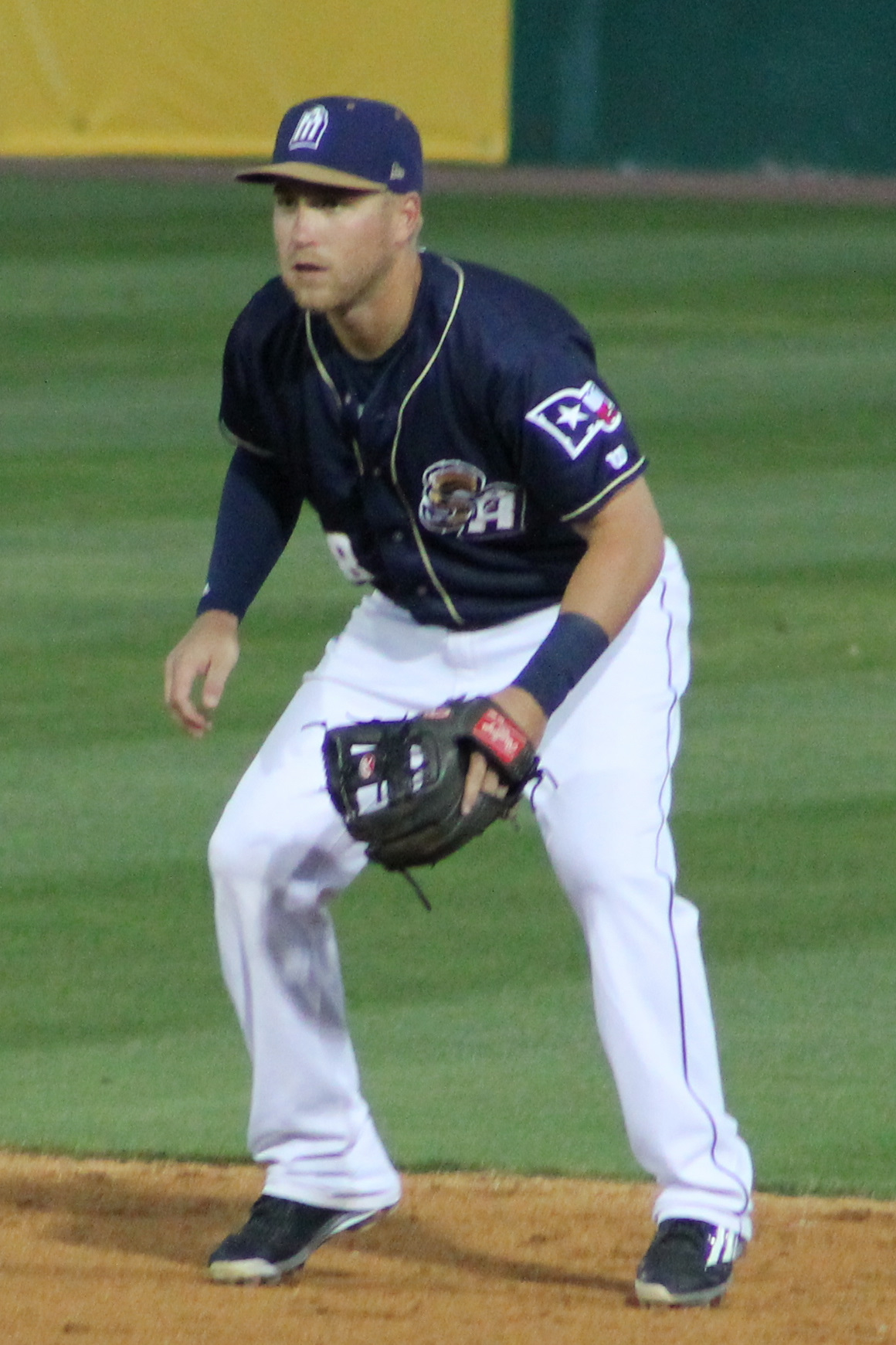
- Lindsey with the San Antonio Missions in 2016
- Second baseman
- Born: December 2, 1991 (age 34); Scottsdale, Arizona, U.S.
- Bats: Left Throws: Right
- Stats at Baseball Reference

Taylor Thomas Lindsey (born December 2, 1991) is an American former professional baseball infielder.

== Career ==
=== Los Angeles Angels ===
Lindsey was drafted 37th overall by the Los Angeles Angels of Anaheim in the 2010 Major League Baseball draft, out of Desert Mountain High School. Prior to the 2014 season, Baseball America rated Lindsey the 93rd best prospect in baseball.

=== San Diego Padres ===
On July 19, 2014, Lindsey was traded to the San Diego Padres with José Rondón, R. J. Alvarez, and Elliot Morris in exchange for Huston Street and Trevor Gott. On November 20, 2014, the Padres added Lindsey to their 40-man roster to protect him from the Rule 5 Draft. Lindsey was designated for assignment on August 11, 2015.

Lindsey split the 2016 campaign between the Double–A San Antonio Missions and Triple–A El Paso Chihuahuas, accumulating a combined .222/.296/.360 slash line with 10 home runs and 35 RBI across 124 games. He elected free agency following the season on November 7, 2016.

=== Laredo Lemurs ===
On April 20, 2017, Lindsey signed with the Laredo Lemurs of the American Association of Independent Professional Baseball. He became a free agent on May 9, 2017, when the Lemurs folded.
