= Kyle Kubitza =

American baseball player (born 1990)

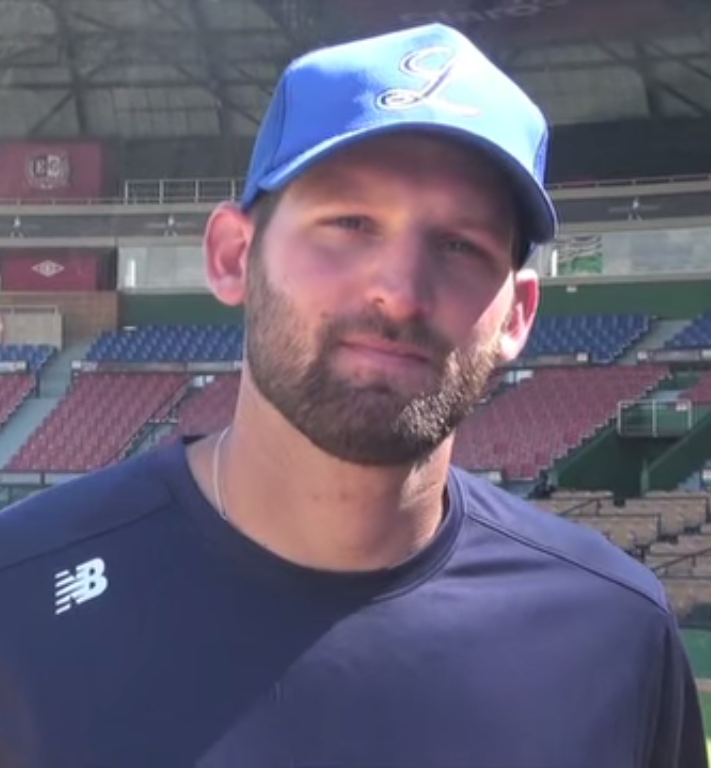
- Kubitza with Tigres del Licey in 2015
- Third baseman
- Born: July 15, 1990 (age 36); Arlington, Texas, U.S.
- Batted: Left Threw: Right

MLB debut
- June 10, 2015, for the Los Angeles Angels of Anaheim

Last MLB appearance
- October 2, 2015, for the Los Angeles Angels of Anaheim

MLB statistics
- Batting average: .194
- Home runs: 0
- Runs batted in: 1
- Stats at Baseball Reference

Teams
- Los Angeles Angels of Anaheim (2015)

Kyle Andrew Kubitza (born July 15, 1990) is an American former professional baseball third baseman. He played in Major League Baseball (MLB) for the Los Angeles Angels.

== Career ==
Kubitza attended Colleyville Heritage High School in Colleyville, Texas. He played college baseball at Texas State University for the Texas State Bobcats. He hit .328 with 27 home runs during his career.

=== Atlanta Braves ===
The Atlanta Braves selected Kubitza in the third round of the 2011 Major League Baseball draft. He signed with the Braves and made his professional debut that season with the Danville Braves. Kubitza played 2012 with the Rome Braves, 2013 with the Lynchburg Hillcats and 2014 with the Mississippi Braves. The Braves added Kubitza to the team's 40-man roster on November 19, 2014.

=== Los Angeles Angels of Anaheim ===
On January 8, 2015, the Braves traded Kubitza and Nate Hyatt to the Los Angeles Angels of Anaheim in exchange for Ricardo Sánchez. He started the season with the Triple-A Salt Lake Bees. The Angels promoted Kubitza to the major leagues on June 10, 2015. He made his major league debut that day in place of David Freese, who had been injured. Kubitza was optioned to the minors on June 28, having hit .214 in eleven games for the Angels. Freese was placed on the disabled list on July 23, clearing a roster spot for Kubitza's return. Five days later, Kubitza was sent to Salt Lake as the Angels sought to promote a backup outfielder to replace Mike Trout. Kubitza began to play other positions during this minor league stint, and was recalled on September 8.

=== Texas Rangers ===
On June 21, 2016, Kubitza was traded to the Texas Rangers for cash considerations after being designated for assignment on June 13, 2016.

=== Atlanta Braves (second stint) ===
On August 12, 2016, Kubitza was claimed off waivers by the Atlanta Braves. On September 2, he was removed from the 40-man roster and sent outright to the Triple–A Gwinnett Braves.

Kubitza returned to Gwinnett in 2017, playing in 92 games and hitting .241/.333/.346 with 5 home runs and 25 RBI. He elected free agency following the season on November 6, 2017.

=== Sugar Land Skeeters ===
Kubitza signed with the Sugar Land Skeeters of the independent Atlantic League of Professional Baseball in early 2018. Kubitza announced his retirement on July 3, 2018.

== Personal life ==
His brother, Austin Kubitza, played Minor League Baseball in the Detroit Tigers and Seattle Mariners organizations as well as independent baseball.
