= Edgar Ibarra =

Venezuelan baseball player (born 1989)

- Pitcher
- Born: May 31, 1989 (age 37); Valencia, Carabobo, Venezuela
- Batted: Left Threw: Left

MLB debut
- June 2, 2015, for the Los Angeles Angels of Anaheim

Last appearance
- June 5, 2015, for the Los Angeles Angels of Anaheim

MLB statistics
- Win–loss record: 0–0
- Earned run average: 2.25
- Strikeouts: 3
- Stats at Baseball Reference

Teams
- Los Angeles Angels of Anaheim (2015)

Edgar Alexander Ibarra (born May 31, 1989) is a Venezuelan former professional baseball pitcher. He played in two games for the Los Angeles Angels of Anaheim of Major League Baseball in 2015.

== Career ==
=== Minnesota Twins ===
Ibarra began his professional career with the Minnesota Twins organization. He made his professional debut in 2008 with the Gulf Coast League Twins, recording a 3.12 ERA in 10 appearances. In 2009, Ibarra played for the rookie-level Elizabethton Twins, pitching to a 6-2 record and 2.84 ERA in 50 2/3 innings of work. He spent the 2010 season with the Single-A Beloit Snappers, pitching to a 6-11 record and 4.81 ERA in 33 appearances. The next year, Ibarra played for the High-A Fort Myers Miracle, registering a 5-10 record and 5.16 ERA in 106 1/3 innings pitched.

Ibarra split the 2012 season between the Double-A New Britain Rock Cats and Fort Myers, accumulating a 3-4 record and 4.69 ERA in 42 games. In 2013, Ibarra split the year between the Triple-A Rochester Red Wings and New Britain, posting a stellar 1.93 ERA with 54 strikeouts in 60 2/3 innings for the two affiliates. On November 4, 2013, the Twins purchased Ibarra's contract, adding him to their 40-man roster. On August 31, 2014, Ibarra was removed from the 40-man roster and sent outright to Triple-A Rochester. Ibarra spent the 2014 season split between Rochester and New Britain, pitching to a 4.22 ERA over 40 total appearances.

=== Los Angeles Angels of Anaheim ===
On December 5, 2014, Ibarra signed a minor league contract with the Los Angeles Angels of Anaheim organization that included an invitation to Spring Training. Ibarra was assigned to the Triple-A Salt Lake Bees to begin the year. On June 1, 2015, Ibarra was selected to the 40-man roster and promoted to the major leagues for the first time. He made his MLB on the next day, pitching two scoreless innings against the Tampa Bay Rays. In the game, Ibarra recorded his first major league strikeout, punching out Rays outfielder Brandon Guyer. Ibarra would appear in one more game on June 5, allowing one run in two innings before being optioned down to Triple-A after the game. On June 28, Ibarra was removed from the 40-man roster and sent outright to Triple-A Salt Lake. He spent the remainder of the year in Salt Lake and elected free agency on October 14.

=== Philadelphia Phillies ===
On January 25, 2016, Ibarra signed a minor league contract with the Philadelphia Phillies organization. Ibarra was released by the team at the end of Spring Training on March 31.

== See also ==
- List of Major League Baseball players from Venezuela
