= Daniel Robertson (outfielder) =

American baseball player (born 1985)

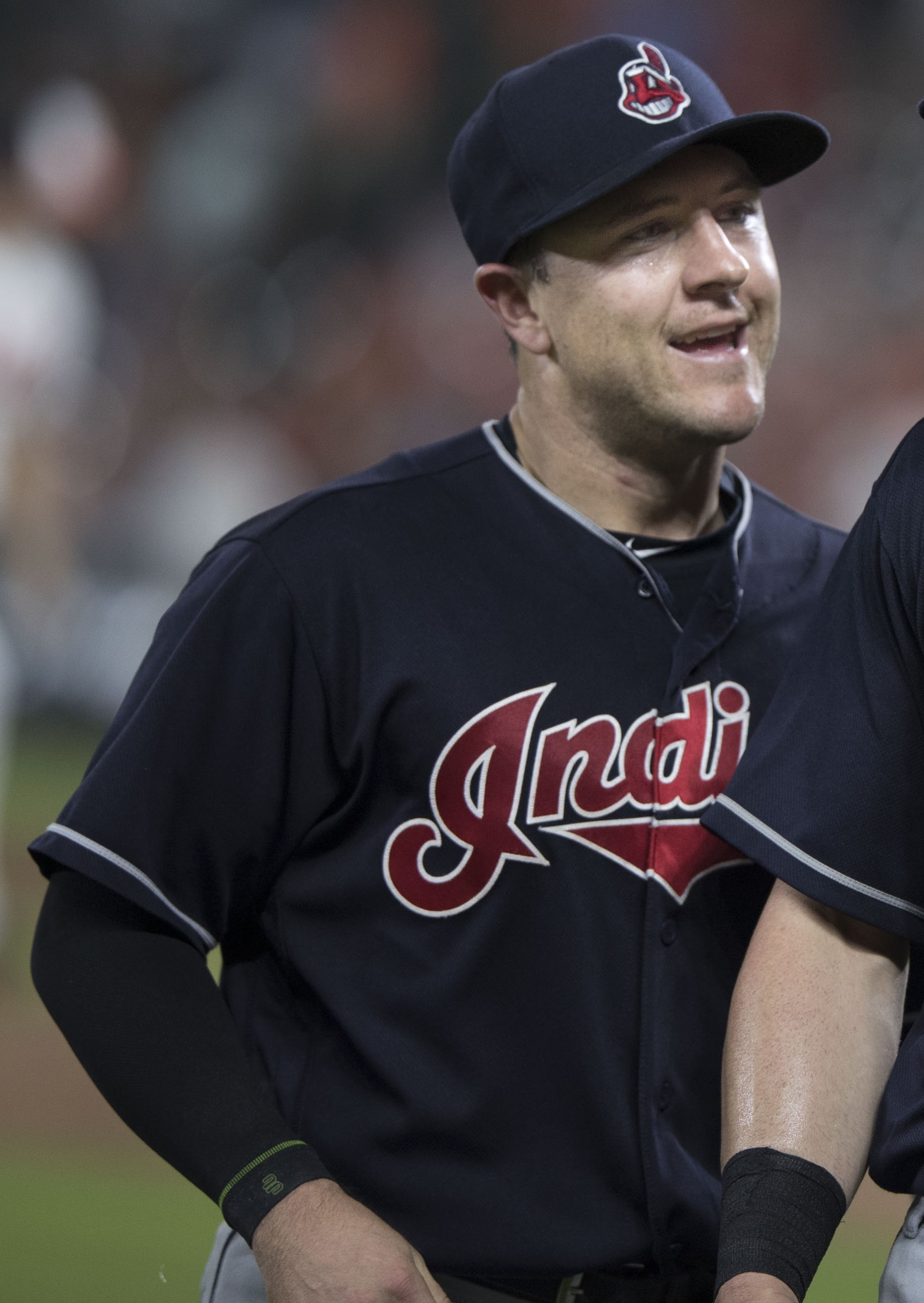
- Robertson with the Cleveland Indians in 2017
- Outfielder
- Born: September 30, 1985 (age 40); Fontana, California, U.S.
- Batted: Right Threw: Right

MLB debut
- April 29, 2014, for the Texas Rangers

Last MLB appearance
- June 25, 2017, for the Cleveland Indians

MLB statistics
- Batting average: .262
- Home runs: 1
- Runs batted in: 36
- Stats at Baseball Reference

Teams
- Texas Rangers (2014); Los Angeles Angels of Anaheim (2015); Seattle Mariners (2016); Cleveland Indians (2017)

Daniel Roger Robertson (born September 30, 1985) is an American former professional baseball outfielder. He played in Major League Baseball (MLB) for the Texas Rangers, Los Angeles Angels of Anaheim, Seattle Mariners, and Cleveland Indians. Robertson currently serves as bench coach of the Columbus Clippers, the Triple-A affiliate of the Cleveland Guardians.

== Playing career ==
=== San Diego Padres ===
Robertson was drafted by the San Diego Padres in the 33rd round of the 2008 Major League Baseball draft out of Oregon State University.

=== Texas Rangers ===
On April 23, 2014, Robertson was acquired by the Texas Rangers through a trade with the Padres, and called up to the majors the same day.

=== Los Angeles Angels ===
Robertson was traded to the Los Angeles Angels of Anaheim for a player to be named later on November 20, 2014.

=== Seattle Mariners ===
On November 6, 2015, Robertson was claimed off waivers by the Seattle Mariners. On December 18, Robertson was designated for assignment by the Mariners following the re-signing of Hisashi Iwakuma. He cleared waivers and was sent outright to the Triple-A Tacoma Rainiers on December 23. On July 5, 2016, the Mariners selected Robertson's contract, adding him to their active roster. In 9 games for the team, he went 5-for-19 (.263) with one RBI. On August 12, Robertson was designated for assignment following the promotion of Joe Wieland. He again cleared waivers and was sent outright to Tacoma on August 15. Robertson elected free agency on October 3.

=== Cleveland Indians ===
On November 23, 2016, Robertson signed a minor league contract with the Cleveland Indians that included an invitation to spring training. After beginning the 2017 season with the Triple-A Columbus Clippers, Robertson's contract was purchased by the Indians on May 14. He was designated for assignment on August 10, to make room for Jay Bruce on the 40-man roster and was released the same day after clearing waivers. The Indians re-signed Robertson to a minor league contract on August 15. He was released on August 28.

=== Arizona Diamondbacks ===
Robertson signed a minor league contract with the Arizona Diamondbacks on February 14, 2018. He was released by the organization on August 3.

=== Sugar Land Skeeters ===
On August 14, 2018, Robertson signed with the Sugar Land Skeeters of the Atlantic League of Professional Baseball. He became a free agent following the 2018 season.

=== Kansas City T-Bones ===
On February 15, 2019, Robertson signed with the Kansas City T-Bones of the American Association of Independent Professional Baseball. He was released on June 1.

=== Cleburne Railroaders ===
On June 17, 2019, Robertson signed with the Cleburne Railroaders of the American Association of Independent Professional Baseball. Robertson was released on March 6, 2020. In the off-season, Robertson had accepted a coaching post at his alma mater, Oregon State University.

== Coaching career ==
On January 13, 2022, the Cleveland Guardians announced Robertson had been hired as bench coach of the Lynchburg Hillcats, the Guardians' Single-A affiliate, for the 2022 season. Robertson was promoted to bench coach of the Double-A Akron RubberDucks on February 7, 2023. On January 24, 2024, Robertson was named bench coach of the Triple-A Columbus Clippers.
