= Taylor Featherston =

American baseball player (born 1989)

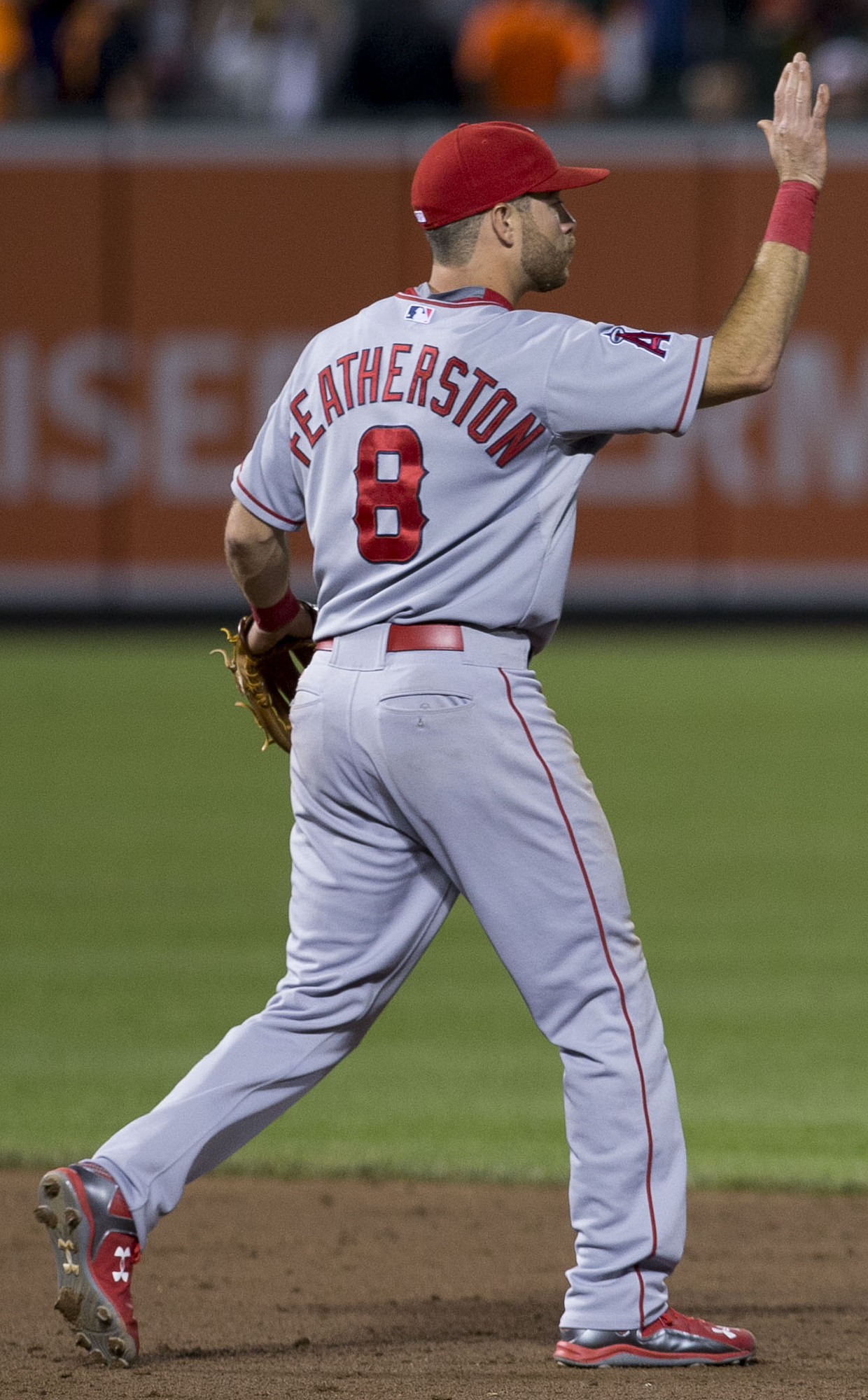
- Featherston with the Los Angeles Angels
- Infielder
- Born: October 8, 1989 (age 36); Houston, Texas, U.S.
- Batted: Right Threw: Right

MLB debut
- April 12, 2015, for the Los Angeles Angels of Anaheim

Last MLB appearance
- July 31, 2017, for the Tampa Bay Rays

MLB statistics
- Batting average: .160
- Home runs: 4
- Runs batted in: 16
- Stats at Baseball Reference

Teams
- Los Angeles Angels of Anaheim (2015); Philadelphia Phillies (2016); Tampa Bay Rays (2017)

Taylor Joseph Featherston (born October 8, 1989) is an American former professional baseball infielder. He played in Major League Baseball (MLB) for the Los Angeles Angels, Philadelphia Phillies, and Tampa Bay Rays.

== Career ==
=== Amateur ===
Featherston graduated from James E. Taylor High School in Katy, Texas. He attended Texas Christian University (TCU), where he played college baseball for the TCU Horned Frogs baseball team. In 2010, he played collegiate summer baseball with the Brewster Whitecaps of the Cape Cod Baseball League.

=== Colorado Rockies ===
The Colorado Rockies selected Featherston in the fifth round of the 2011 MLB draft. In 2014, he played for the Tulsa Drillers of the Double–A Texas League. He had a .260 batting average, 16 home runs, and 57 runs batted in for Tulsa.

=== Los Angeles Angels of Anaheim ===
On December 11, 2014, the Chicago Cubs selected Featherston from the Rockies in the Rule 5 Draft, and subsequently traded him to the Los Angeles Angels in exchange for cash considerations. Featherston competed for a role with the Angels as a utility infielder in spring training. The Angels carried Featherston as their backup infielder on their Opening Day roster. He made his major league debut on April 12. Featherston batted .162 during the 2015 season, receiving 154 at bats in 101 games played.

On February 5, 2016, Featherston was designated for assignment following the acquisition of Christian Friedrich.

=== Philadelphia Phillies ===
On February 10, 2016, the Philadelphia Phillies acquired Featherston from the Angels in exchange for a player to be named later or cash considerations. He began the 2016 season with the Lehigh Valley IronPigs of the Triple–A International League. The Phillies promoted Featherston to the major leagues on July 25. They designated him for assignment on September 10. Featherston began the 2017 season with Lehigh Valley.

=== Tampa Bay Rays ===
On June 9, 2017, the Phillies traded Featherston to the Tampa Bay Rays in exchange for cash considerations. He batted .179 for the Rays, and also played for the Triple–A Durham Bulls of the International League.

=== Minnesota Twins ===
On December 15, 2017, Featherston signed a minor league contract with the Minnesota Twins. He was released on June 18, 2018.

=== Kansas City T-Bones ===
On June 25, 2018, Featherston signed with the Kansas City T-Bones of the American Association of Independent Professional Baseball. In 25 games he struggled mightily hitting .202/.288/.434 with 5 home runs, 15 RBIs and 2 stolen bases.

=== Cincinnati Reds ===
On July 24, 2018, Featherston's contract was purchased by the Cincinnati Reds organization. In 36 games for the Double-A Pensacola Blue Wahoos, he batted .237/.283/.378 with 3 home runs and 15 RBI. Featherston elected free agency following the season on November 2.

=== Kansas City Royals ===
On January 3, 2019, Featherston signed a minor league contract with the Kansas City Royals. In 118 games split between the Double–A Northwest Arkansas Naturals and Triple–A Omaha Storm Chasers, he slashed a combined .241/.303/.426 with 17 home runs and 58 RBI. Featherston elected free agency following the season on November 4.

=== Seattle Mariners ===
On April 6, 2022, after spending the past two years out of baseball, Featherston signed a minor league contract with the Seattle Mariners organization. He elected free agency following the season, without having appeared for the organization, on November 10.

In September 2023, Featherston joined Whitebox Real Estate as an associate broker, officially ending his playing career.

== Personal life ==
On April 6, 2020, Featherston married Taylor (née Lowery).
