= Huston Street =

American baseball player (born 1983)

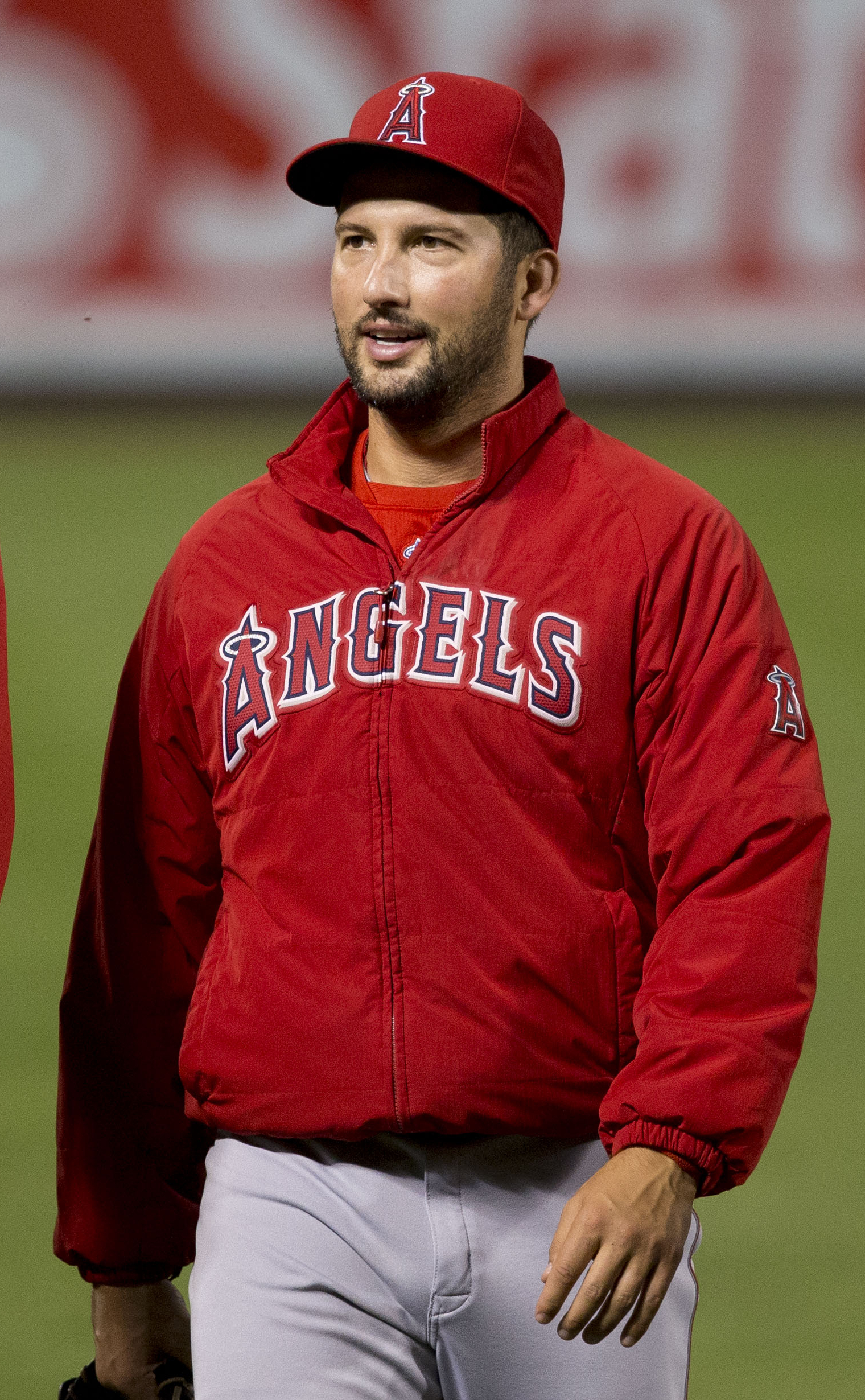
- Street with the Los Angeles Angels in 2015
- Pitcher
- Born: August 2, 1983 (age 43); Austin, Texas, U.S.
- Batted: Right Threw: Right

MLB debut
- April 6, 2005, for the Oakland Athletics

Last MLB appearance
- July 2, 2017, for the Los Angeles Angels

MLB statistics
- Win–loss record: 42–34
- Earned run average: 2.95
- Strikeouts: 665
- Saves: 324
- Stats at Baseball Reference

Teams
- Oakland Athletics (2005–2008); Colorado Rockies (2009–2011); San Diego Padres (2012–2014); Los Angeles Angels of Anaheim / Los Angeles Angels (2014–2017)

Career highlights and awards
- 2× All-Star (2012, 2014); AL Rookie of the Year (2005)
Medals
Men's baseball
Representing United States
Pan American Games
Silver medal – second place	2003 Santo Domingo	Team competition

Huston Lowell Street (/ˈhjuːstən/ HEW-stən; born August 2, 1983) is an American former professional baseball pitcher. He played 13 seasons in Major League Baseball (MLB) for the Oakland Athletics, Colorado Rockies, San Diego Padres and Los Angeles Angels.

After a standout college baseball career for the Texas Longhorns, the Athletics drafted Street in the first round of the 2004 MLB draft. He won the MLB Rookie of the Year Award in 2005, and was named an All-Star in 2012 and 2014.

== Early career ==
=== High school and college ===
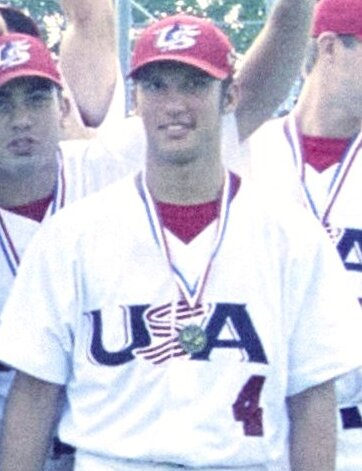
Street with the United States national collegiate baseball team at Haarlem Baseball Week in 2002

Street attended Westlake High School in Austin, Texas, from 1997 to 2001, where he lettered in both football and baseball, winning all-state and all-district honors in both sports. He then attended the University of Texas at Austin from 2001 to 2004, where he pitched for the school's baseball team. Statistically one of the best collegiate closers of all time, Street is in the top 20 for career saves (41) and fewest hits allowed per nine innings (5.46). Street received All-American honors at Texas every season he was there, and helped his team win the College World Series of collegiate baseball in 2002. In that season, he set a CWS record for the most saves and was named Most Outstanding Player. He won the USA Baseball Richard W. "Dick" Case Award in 2003. A year later, Street led the Longhorns to the Series semifinals, and in 2004, he helped his team to the finals, only to lose in two games to Cal State Fullerton. In 2010, Street was named to the NCAA College World Series Legends Team.

== Professional career ==
=== Oakland Athletics ===
Drafted by the Oakland Athletics in the first round, 40th overall, of the 2004 MLB draft, Street spent a few months in the minor leagues, spending no more than a month at each level. He then was invited to the Arizona Fall League where his team took the championship.

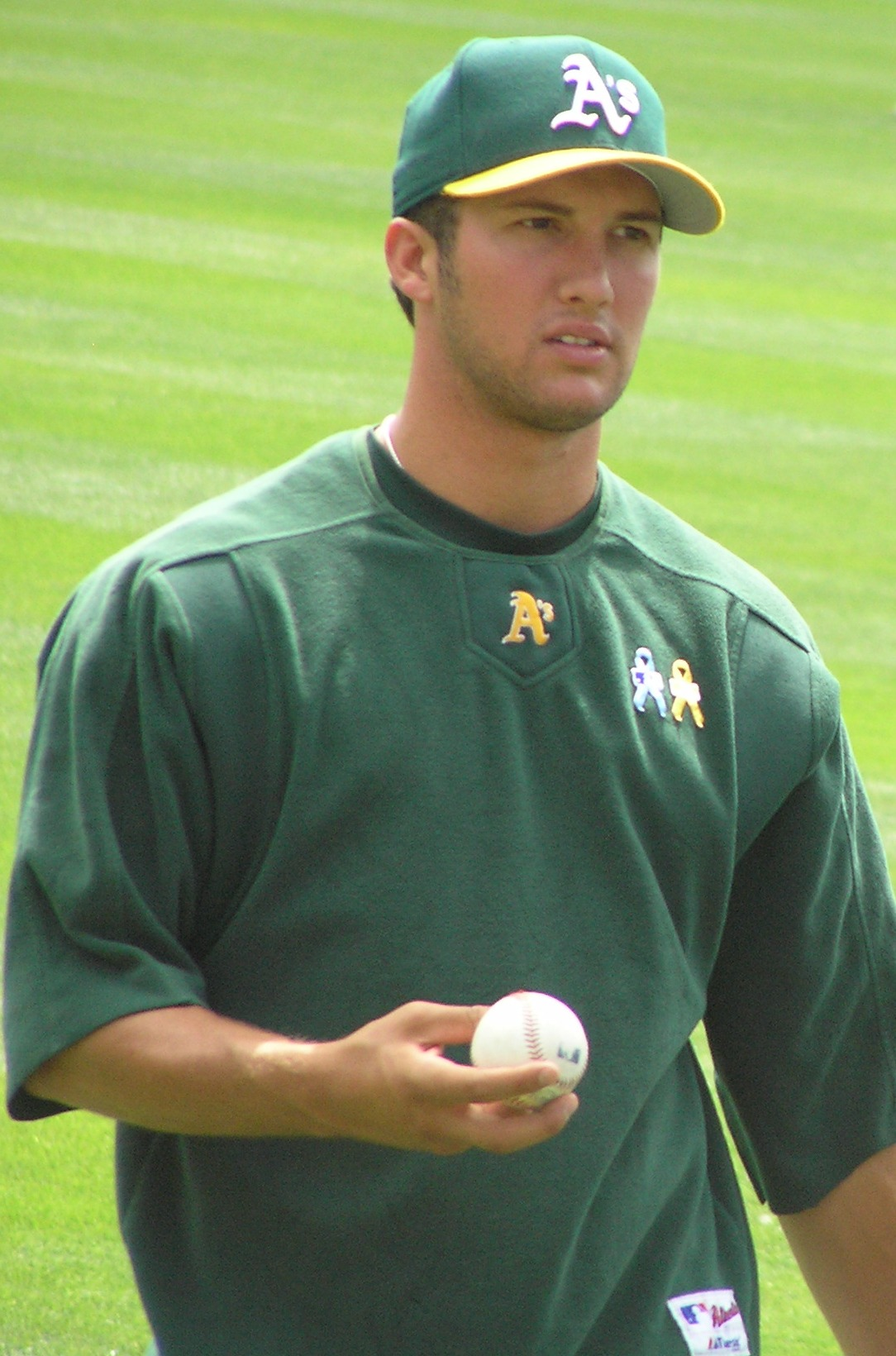
Street with the Oakland Athletics

Street was called up to MLB at the start of the 2005 season. He became Oakland's closer when incumbent Octavio Dotel went down in May with an elbow injury that required Tommy John surgery. Street saved 23 games in 27 chances to go along with a 5–1 record, 72 strikeouts, and a 1.72 ERA. Only Mariano Rivera's 1.38 ERA for the Yankees was better among American League relievers. Street had 72 strikeouts in 78 1/3 innings pitched, and opposing hitters batted only .194 against him. He was rewarded for his effort by being named Rookie of the Year, as the third player in a row who had spent some time in the Athletics organization (after Ángel Berroa in 2003, and Bobby Crosby in 2004).

Street continued to serve as the closer for the A's in 2006. He finished the season with a 4-4 record, 37 saves, 67 strikeouts, a 3.31 ERA in 70.2 innings pitched, and 11 blown saves. On October 14, Street gave up a walk-off three-run home run to Magglio Ordóñez of the Detroit Tigers in Game 4 of the 2006 ALCS that ended the A's postseason. Street had a solid season in 2007, despite missing time with an injury. He went 5–2 with a 2.88 ERA, with 16 saves and 62 strikeouts in 50 innings. Street struggled somewhat with a nagging injury in 2008. After a rough stretch in July and August, he lost his closer position to rookie Brad Ziegler. Street's health and pitching improved, although Ziegler continued to close.

=== Colorado Rockies ===
On November 12, 2008, Street was traded to the Colorado Rockies with outfielder Carlos González and pitcher Greg Smith for outfielder Matt Holliday.

He beat out Manny Corpas to earn the role of the Rockies' closing pitcher for the 2009 season. After poor performances by Street, Corpas was renamed the closer on April 17; however, Corpas also pitched poorly, and the closer job was given back to Street on May 1. Since that time, Street excelled in the closer role and was a key cog in the Rockies' mid-season run back into the race (16–1 from June 4 to 22). He finished 2009 with 35 saves in 37 opportunities, a 3.06 ERA and 70 strikeouts in 61.2 innings.

After a 2009 season in which he blew only two saves, Street struggled during the playoffs for the Rockies. In Game 4 of the 2009 National League Division Series, Street entered the ninth inning with the Rockies leading 4–2. He was able to record the first two outs before allowing three runs that gave the Phillies a 5–4 win and a series victory. Before the 2010 season, Street and the Rockies agreed on a three-year $22.5 million contract with an option for 2013.

Street missed the first 2 1/2 months of the season of the 2010 season with shoulder soreness, but on returning to the team he assumed the role of closer. Prior to a game on July 26, 2010, Street was struck in the midsection by a line drive during batting practice. He fainted several times from the pain and needed to be taken off the field in an ambulance, but he avoided the disabled list. Street finished 2010 with 20 saves in 25 opportunities and a 3.61 ERA.

Street opened 2011 as the Rockies closer, saving 29 games in 32 opportunities through early August. He suffered a right triceps strain and was sent to the 15-day disabled list on August 12. When he returned, he worked in the role of set-up man while Rafael Betancourt remained as closer. Street finished 2011 with a 3.86 ERA and 55 strike-outs versus 9 walks in 58.1 innings.

=== San Diego Padres ===
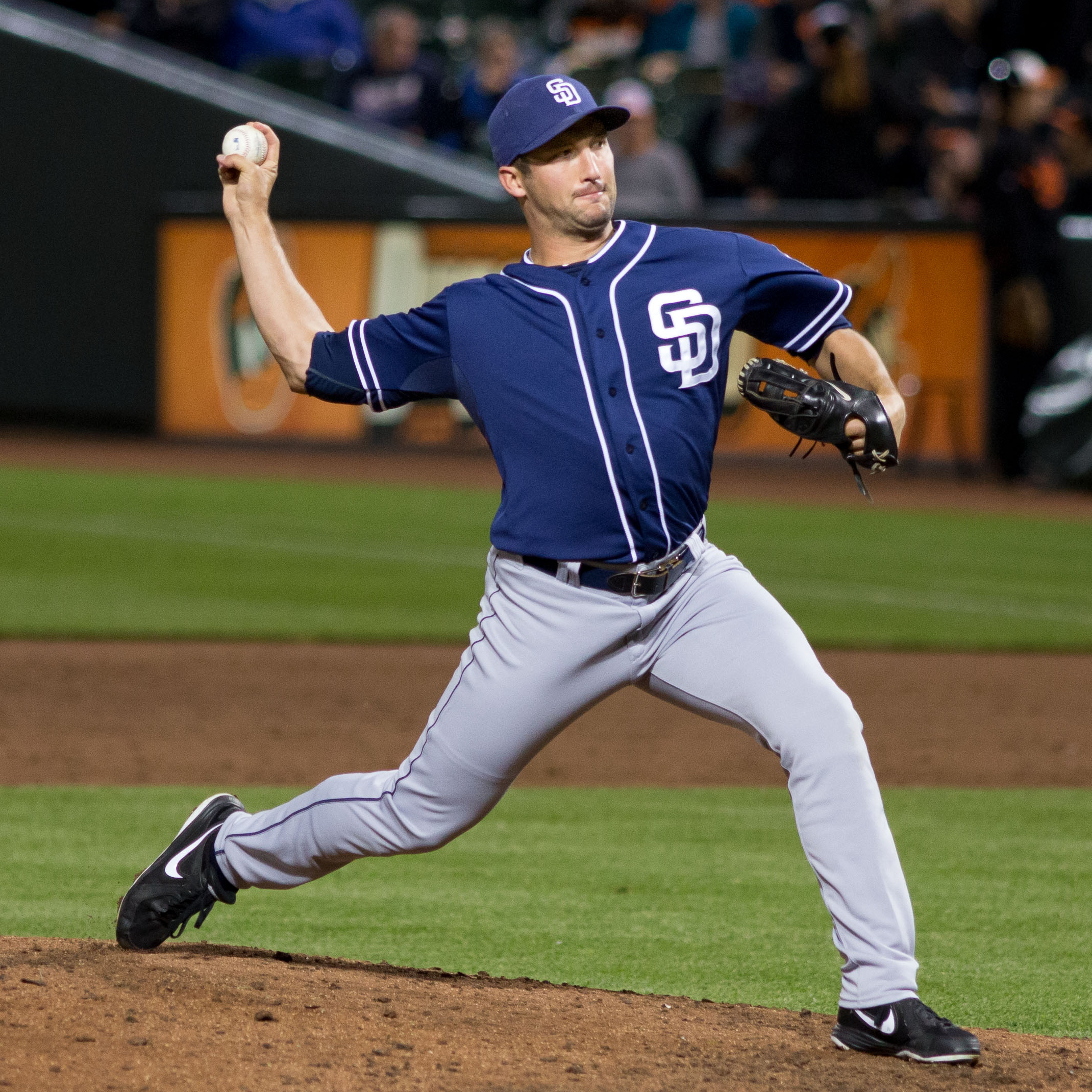
Street pitching for the San Diego Padres in 2013

Street was traded by the Rockies to the San Diego Padres for left hander Nick Schmidt on December 7, 2011. The Padres picked up all but $500,000 of Street's remaining contract, and he moved immediately into the closer role vacated by Heath Bell. Street missed a month with a right shoulder strain, but otherwise had an excellent first half with the Padres. He compiled a 1.13 ERA, was 13 for 13 in converting save opportunities, and did not allow a home run in his 25 games, earning a selection to his first All-Star Game. On July 29, 2012, the Padres and Street agreed to terms on a two-year contract extension with a club option for the 2015 season.

On August 10, 2012, Street suffered a strained left calf while fielding the final out of the game and missed the next six weeks. At the time of the injury, he had not allowed a run since June 17. He returned to pitch in three more games at the end of the season, earning his 200th career save in his first game back. His only blown save, loss, and home runs given up for the season (two) all occurred in his final appearance of the year against the San Francisco Giants. Street finished the 2012 season with 23 saves in 24 chances and a 1.85 ERA in 39 innings pitched, striking out 47 against 11 walks.

Street had difficulties in the first half of the 2013 season, giving up 10 home runs in 26 1/3 innings through June 23. But he followed that with a streak of 20 1/3 scoreless innings from June 26 through September 3, earning the National League Player of the Week honor for the week ending September 8. Street appeared in 58 games in 2013, missing only a couple of weeks in early June with a calf strain. He converted 33 of 35 save opportunities and posted a 2.70 ERA, striking out 46 and walking 14 in 56 2/3 innings.

=== Los Angeles Angels of Anaheim / Los Angeles Angels ===
On July 19, 2014, Street was traded to the Los Angeles Angels with Trevor Gott in exchange for Taylor Lindsey, José Rondón, R. J. Alvarez, and Elliot Morris. After joining the Angels, Street recorded 10 saves in a row without allowing any runs, providing a huge upgrade for the struggling Angels bullpen.

In May 2015, Street signed a two-year contract extension with the Angels worth $18 million.

On July 22, 2015, Street recorded his 300th career save in a victory over the Minnesota Twins, becoming the 27th pitcher all time to reach the 300 saves milestone.

After struggling for most of the 2016 season, Street was ruled out for the remainder of the year after undergoing right knee surgery on August 24.

Street was activated from the disabled list on June 22, 2017 to play for the first time since 2016. He made his season debut on June 23, pitching a scoreless inning with one strikeout. He went back on the disabled list and was ruled out for the season, only pitching in 4 games.

On March 29, 2018, Street announced his retirement from Major League Baseball on Twitter after battling injuries for the previous two seasons.

== Pitching style ==
As opposed to most closers who are power pitchers, Street relied on his pitch control. In his professional career, he mostly threw fastballs and sliders, with an occasional changeup. His fastball speed was slower than other pitchers, usually hovering around 90 mph (140 km/h), but his fastball has an unusual breaking movement.

Street pitched with and without windup. His windup was unusual in that he made a large step to the first base side first. He also pitched from a lower angle than a conventional overhand throw, a style Street says he adopted in college.

== Personal life ==
Street's father was former University of Texas quarterback James Street, and his brother Juston Street was previously a pitcher for the minor league Vancouver Canadians. Street and his ex-wife, Lacey, have three sons named Ripken Rae Street, Ryder James Street, and Rafe William Street.

Awards and achievements
Preceded by Khalil Greene	Baseball America Rookie of the Year; 2005	Succeeded by Justin Verlander
Preceded by Bobby Crosby	Players Choice AL Most Outstanding Rookie; 2005	Succeeded by Justin Verlander
