= Trevor Gott =

American baseball player (born 1992)

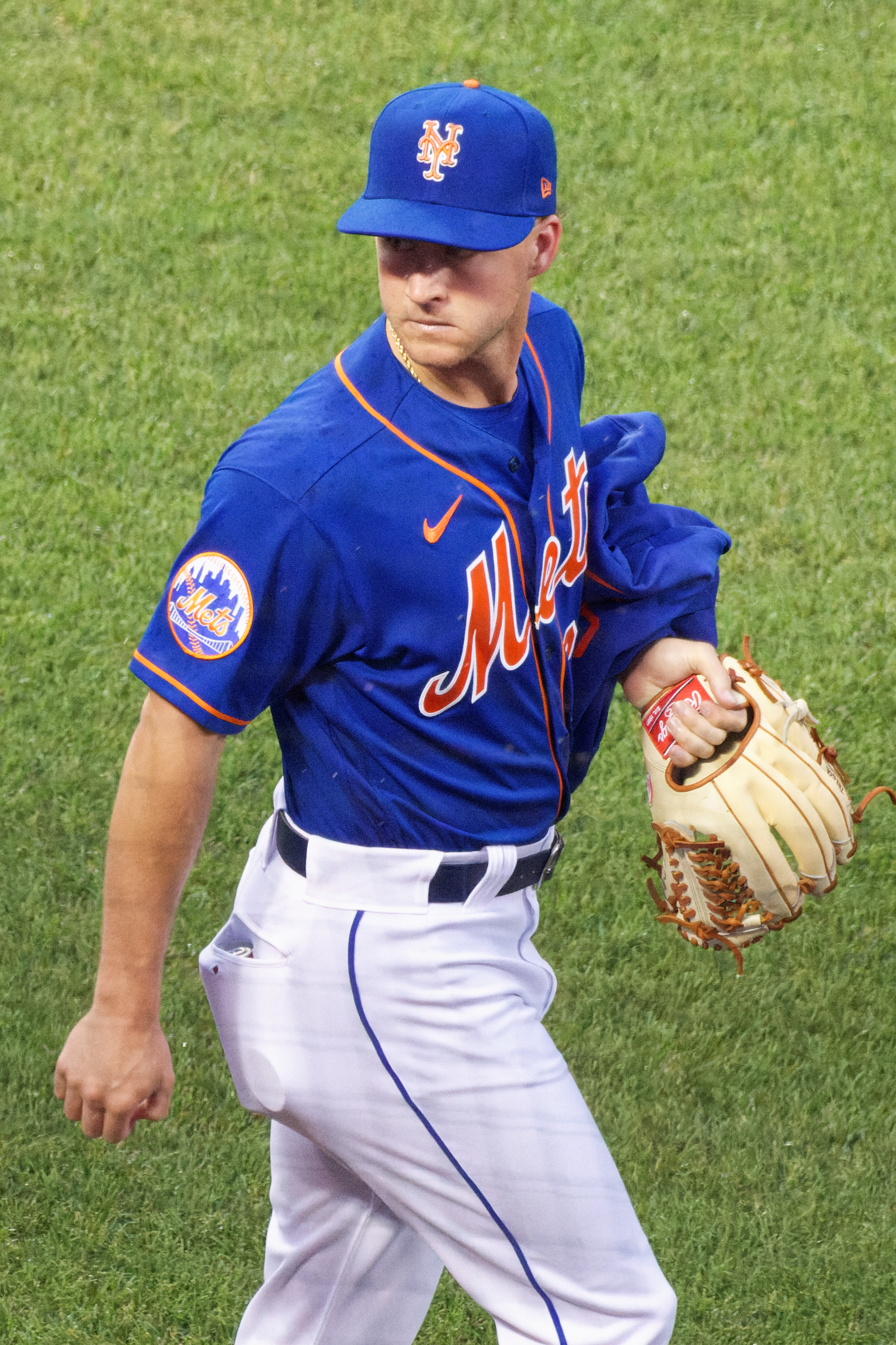
- Gott with the Mets in 2023

San Diego Padres
- Pitcher
- Born: August 26, 1992 (age 34); Lexington, Kentucky, U.S.
- Bats: Right Throws: Right

MLB debut
- June 14, 2015, for the Los Angeles Angels of Anaheim

MLB statistics (through 2023 season)
- Win–loss record: 16–15
- Earned run average: 4.65
- Strikeouts: 222
- Stats at Baseball Reference

Teams
- Los Angeles Angels of Anaheim (2015); Washington Nationals (2016–2018); San Francisco Giants (2019–2020); Milwaukee Brewers (2022); Seattle Mariners (2023); New York Mets (2023)

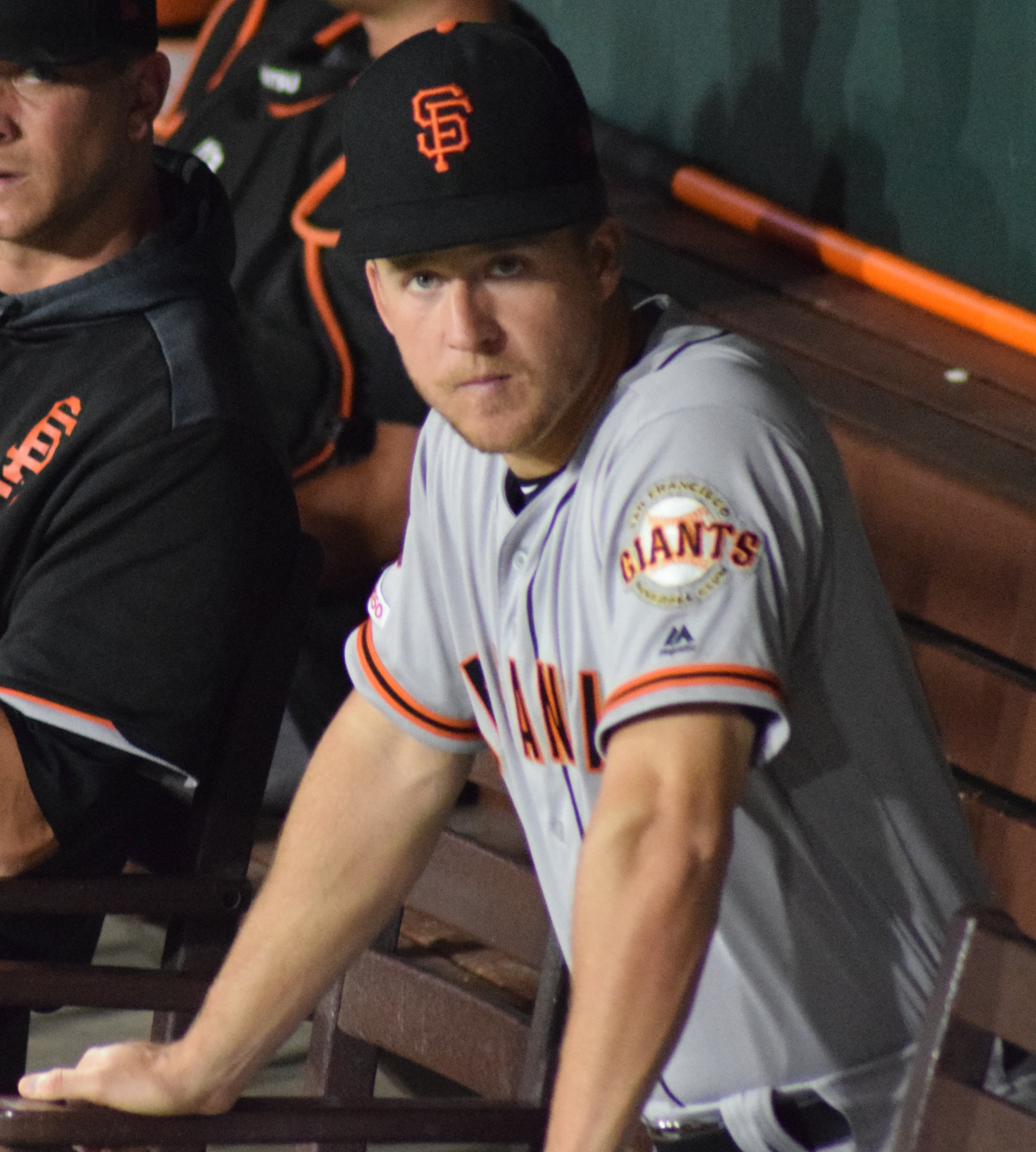
Gott with the Giants in 2019

Trevor Vaughan Gott (born August 26, 1992) is an American professional baseball pitcher in the San Diego Padres organization. He has previously played in Major League Baseball (MLB) for the Los Angeles Angels of Anaheim, Washington Nationals, San Francisco Giants, Milwaukee Brewers, Seattle Mariners, and New York Mets.

Gott played college baseball at the University of Kentucky. He was drafted by the San Diego Padres in the sixth round of the 2013 Major League Baseball draft.

== Early life ==
Gott was born on August 26, 1992, in Lexington, Kentucky. He was a pitcher on the Southeast Lexington team that went to the Cal Ripken 12-and-Under World Series in 2005. During one game in that series, he struck out nine batters in three innings.

Gott attended Tates Creek High School. In 2010, a writer with The State Journal referred to him as "one of the best pitchers in the state." As a senior, he was 6–0 with a 1.12 ERA and 76 strikeouts in 47.1 innings, and batted .382 with two home runs and 13 RBIs. He was the Gatorade Kentucky High School Player of the Year.

== College career ==
Gott played college baseball at the University of Kentucky for the Wildcats from 2011 to 2013. After his freshman year, he pitched for the Orleans Firebirds of the Cape Cod Baseball League, where he was the winner of the Russell Ford Award as the league's reliever of the year. As a sophomore in 2012, Gott set the Kentucky record for saves in a season with nine. Before the start of the 2013 season, Gott had recovered from a minor bout of bursitis and he was on the preseason watch list for the NCBWA Stopper of the Year Award. That year he broke his own single-season save record, finishing with 12, and he also set the school's all-time saves record with 20.

== Professional career ==
=== Draft and minor leagues ===
In early 2013, Baseball America named Gott as the second-best draft prospect from the University of Kentucky behind Corey Littrell. The San Diego Padres drafted Gott in the sixth round of the 2013 Major League Baseball draft. He signed with the Padres for a $200,000 signing bonus and made his professional debut with the Eugene Emeralds of the Low–A Northwest League. After making four appearances with Eugene in which he pitched to an earned run average (ERA) of 2.08, walked three, and struck out eight in 4 1/3 innings with no decisions, he was promoted to the Fort Wayne TinCaps of the Single–A Midwest League. He finished the season with the TinCaps, making 27 appearances for them and pitching 31 2/3 innings in which he walked 12, struck out 33, posted a record of 2–2 and an ERA of 2.56, and recorded his first four professional saves in five opportunities. He finished the 2013 season with 31 appearances and a 2.50 ERA overall, with 15 walks, 41 strikeouts, four saves, and a record of 2–2 in 36 innings of work.

Gott started 2014 with the Lake Elsinore Storm in the High-A California League and was named a California League All-Star. He pitched 31 1/3 innings in 29 games for Lake Elsinore, striking out 31, walking nine, posting a record of 2–2 and an ERA of 3.16, and recording 16 saves in 20 opportunities. He was promoted to the San Antonio Missions of the Double-A Texas League in July 2014. In 10 appearances for San Antonio, he had no decisions, but he struck out 11, walked nine, and pitched to a 4.63 ERA in 11 2/3 innings of work.

On July 19, 2014, the Padres traded Gott, along with Huston Street, to the Los Angeles Angels of Anaheim in exchange for Taylor Lindsey, R. J. Alvarez, José Rondón, and Elliot Morris. The Angels sent him to the Arkansas Travelers of the Double-A Texas League, where he finished the season. He had a record of 2–1 and an ERA of 1.53 at Arkansas with 18 strikeouts, seven walks, and two saves in four opportunities, pitching 17 2/3 innings in 13 games. Overall in 2014, he made 52 appearances for three minor-league teams, pitching 60 2/3 innings, striking out 60, walking 25, posting a record of 4–5 and an ERA of 2.97, and recording 18 saves in 24 opportunities.

In the fall of 2014, Gott played for the Mesa Solar Sox in the Arizona Fall League. He made eight appearances for the Solar Sox with no decisions, posting an ERA of 6.14 in 7 1/3 innings of work, walking two, striking out four, and recording one save. He also was honored as an Arizona Fall League Rising Star and represented Mesa on the East team in the league's Fall Stars Game that year.

Gott started the 2015 season with Arkansas, pitching 19 2/3 innings in 18 appearances with a record of 1–0 and an ERA of 3.20, striking out 20, walking seven, and going 8-for-8 in save opportunities. He was a Texas League mid-season all-star in 2015. Promoted to the Salt Lake Bees of the Triple-A Pacific Coast League on May 24, he blew his only save opportunity but gave up no earned runs in seven appearances for the Bees, striking out 10 and walking five in 8 1/3 innings of work with no decisions, giving him overall minor-league statistics for 2015 of 28 innings pitched in 25 games with a record of 1–0, an ERA of 2.25, 30 strikeouts, 12 walks, and eight saves in nine opportunities.

=== Los Angeles Angels of Anaheim (2015) ===
The Angels selected Gott's contract from the Bees on June 13, and he made his major-league debut with the Angels on June 14, 2015. Later in the season, he became one of several relievers in the Angels' bullpen to handle the eighth and ninth innings after closer Huston Street and setup man Joe Smith both suffered injuries. He finished the season with the Angels, appearing in 48 games for them, going 0-for-4 in save opportunities but striking out 27, walking 16, and posting a record of 4–2 and an ERA of 3.02 in 47 2/3 innings pitched.

=== Washington Nationals (2016–2018) ===
On December 10, 2015, the Angels traded Gott, along with Michael Brady, to the Washington Nationals in exchange for Yunel Escobar.

==== 2016 ====
The Nationals assigned Gott to the Syracuse Chiefs in the Triple–A International League to start the 2016 season. He went on the seven-day disabled list on June 6 with elbow inflammation, and remained out of action until July 25, when he was sent to the Gulf Coast League Nationals of the rookie-level Gulf Coast League for a rehabilitation assignment. Gott took the loss in his only appearance for the Gulf Coast League Nationals, giving up two earned runs and striking out two in two innings pitched. On July 27, he reported to the Auburn Doubledays of the Low–A New York-Penn League to continue his rehabilitation assignment and made one appearance for them, giving up an earned run and striking out two in two innings of work. Gott was reactivated to play for Syracuse August 1. Overall, Gott made 33 appearances for Syracuse in 2016, pitching 39 1/3 innings, posting a record of 3–3 and an ERA of 4.35, striking out 31, walking 13, and recording one save in three opportunities.

After major-league rosters expanded to 40 men, the Nationals called Gott up on September 2. Gott posted a 1.50 ERA in six innings over nine appearances for Washington, striking out six and walking three with no decisions.

==== 2017 ====
Gott began the 2017 season with Syracuse. The Nationals called him up to the majors on June 12 when Washington needed bullpen reinforcements. He earned his first win with the Nationals on June 13, but he ended up as the team's "sacrificial lamb" in a 13–2 loss to the Atlanta Braves the next day, needing 52 pitches to get through 2 2/3 innings, striking out two batters but giving up five runs – all earned – on five hits and two walks before he was relieved. Washington optioned Gott back to Syracuse after the game. The Nationals recalled Gott on July 14 after they optioned Sammy Solis to the minors and placed Joe Ross on the disabled list with a torn ulnar collateral ligament of the elbow. Appearing in the ninth inning of a game against the Cincinnati Reds the next day in which Washington led 10–2, Gott proceeded to give up five earned runs without recording an out before de facto closer Matt Grace entered to record the save. The Nationals again optioned Gott to Syracuse on July 18. On July 24, he went on the 7-day disabled list retroactive to July 22, and did not return to action in 2017, subsequently being shut down for the season to undergo hernia surgery. Overall in 2017, Gott made 30 appearances for Syracuse, pitching 37 1/3 innings, striking out 35, walking 13, posting a record of 2–0 and an ERA of 3.86, and going 4-for-4 in save opportunities; for Washington, he made four appearances, with a 1–0 record and three strikeouts in three innings of work, but he also walked three and his major-league ERA for the season was 30.00.

==== 2018 ====
After a standout performance in spring training in which he posted a 1.54 ERA in 11 2/3 innings over 11 appearances, Gott began the 2018 season on the Nationals′ 25-man roster. To start the season, he appeared in five games, pitching five innings and giving up three earned runs for a 5.40 ERA before he was optioned to Syracuse on April 16. The Nationals recalled Gott on April 21 when they placed Grace on the disabled list. Gott slipped on the mound and sprained his ankle at Nationals Park in Washington, D.C., on May 5 during the sixth inning of a 7–3 win over the Philadelphia Phillies, throwing 17 pitches and getting one out but giving up a single, two home runs, and three earned runs before exiting. He remained with the Nationals after the incident and without a stint on the disabled list. Gott had a 5.28 ERA, an 0–2 record, seven walks, and 12 strikeouts in 15 1/3 innings over 17 major-league appearances on the season when the Nationals optioned him to Syracuse again to make room on their roster when they activated reliever Ryan Madson from the disabled list. The Nationals again recalled Gott from Syracuse, along with reliever Wander Suero, on June 11 when they placed starting pitcher Stephen Strasburg and reliever Brandon Kintzler on the disabled list, and on June 13 – by which time he had lowered his major-league ERA for the season to 4.96 but had given up eight walks along with striking out 12 in the majors for the year – again optioned him to Syracuse when they called up starting pitcher Erick Fedde from the Chiefs.

=== San Francisco Giants (2019–2020) ===
On February 13, 2019, after being designated for assignment, Gott was acquired by the San Francisco Giants in exchange for cash. Pitching for the Giants in 2019 he was 7–0 with one save and a 4.44 ERA, as in 50 relief appearances he pitched 52.2 innings and struck out 57 batters. Gott made 15 appearances for the Giants in 2020, pitching to a ghastly 10.03 ERA with 8 strikeouts and 13 earned runs over 11.2 innings of work. On February 21, 2021, Gott was designated for assignment after the signing of Aaron Sanchez was made official. On February 25, Gott cleared waivers and was outrighted to the Triple-A Sacramento River Cats.

On April 19, 2021, Gott was selected to the active roster. He was designated for assignment by the Giants the next day without making an appearance for the team. On April 27, he was outrighted to the alternate training site. Gott spent the 2021 season with Triple-A Sacramento, making 43 appearances, posting a 4.10 ERA with 53 strikeouts. On September 4, Gott retired the side in the ninth inning to close out the first no-hitter in River Cats history. On October 4, Gott elected free agency.

=== Milwaukee Brewers (2022) ===
On November 3, 2021, Gott signed a major league contract with the Milwaukee Brewers. He made 45 appearances out of the bullpen in 2022, recording a 4.14 ERA with 44 strikeouts across 45 2/3 innings pitched. On November 18, 2022, Gott was non-tendered and became a free agent.

=== Seattle Mariners (2023) ===
On November 28, 2022, Gott signed a one-year, $1.2 million contract with the Seattle Mariners. Gott made 30 appearances for Seattle in 2023, with a 4.03 ERA and 32 strikeouts in 29 innings pitched.

=== New York Mets (2023) ===
On July 3, 2023, Gott was traded alongside Chris Flexen to the New York Mets for Zach Muckenhirn. In 34 appearances for the Mets, he registered a 4.34 ERA with 30 strikeouts across 29 innings. Gott was non-tendered and became a free agent on November 17.

=== Oakland Athletics (2024) ===
On December 19, 2023, Gott signed a one-year, $1.5 million contract, with the Oakland Athletics. On March 22, 2024, it was announced that Gott would require Tommy John surgery to repair a fully torn UCL, ending his season.

=== Seattle Mariners (2025) ===
On February 23, 2025, Gott signed a minor league contract with the Seattle Mariners. He was released by the Mariners on June 2. On June 7, Gott re-signed with Seattle on a new minor league contract. In 24 appearances split between the rookie-level Arizona Complex League Mariners and Triple-A Tacoma Rainiers, he posted a combined 3–3 record and 7.40 ERA with 19 strikeouts across 20 2/3 innings pitched. The Mariners released Gott again on August 5.

=== Washington Nationals (2026) ===
On January 17, 2026, Gott signed a minor league contract with the Washington Nationals. He made 26 appearances for the Triple–A Rochester Red Wings, posting a 4–0 record and 3.55 ERA with 27 strikeouts and one save over 33 innings of work. Gott was released by the Nationals on July 2.

=== San Diego Padres (2026) ===
On September 8, 2026, Gott signed a two-year minor league contract with the San Diego Padres. In 2 games with Triple-A El Paso Chihuahuas he threw one inning of relief giving up 3 runs on one hit (27.00 ERA) with 1 walk and 1 strikeout.
