= 2011 San Diego Padres season =

2011 San Diego Padres
- League: National League
- Division: West
- Ballpark: Petco Park
- City: San Diego, California
- Record: 71–91 (.438)
- Divisional place: 5th
- Owners: Jeff Moorad
- General managers: Jed Hoyer
- Managers: Bud Black
- Television: 4SD (Dick Enberg, Mark Grant, Tony Gwynn, Mark Neely); Cablemas (Spanish)
- Radio: XX Sports Radio (Ted Leitner, Jerry Coleman, Andy Masur); XEMO-AM (Spanish) (Eduardo Otega, Juan Angel Avila)

The 2011 San Diego Padres season was the 43rd season in franchise history. The Padres finish the season at 71–91 and missed the playoffs for the 5th straight season.

== 2010–2011 offseason ==
Adrián González would have been in the last year of his contract in 2011, but the Padres were not going to meet González's open market value especially with Jeff Moorad's purchase of the Padres from John Moores not completing until around 2013. On December 6, 2010, González was traded to the Boston Red Sox for a package of right-handed pitcher Casey Kelly, first baseman Anthony Rizzo, outfielder Reymond Fuentes, and a player to be named later, later determined to be Eric Patterson.

The Padres also acquired outfielder Cameron Maybin from the Florida Marlins for relievers Ryan Webb and Edward Mujica.

- Jason Bartlett signed
- Brad Hawpe signed
- Orlando Hudson signed
- Cameron Maybin acquired
- Dustin Moseley signed
- Chad Qualls signed
- Aaron Harang signed
- Jesús Guzmán signed

Among the players that left San Diego were:

- Tony Gwynn Jr. who went to the Los Angeles Dodgers
- Scott Hairston and Chris Young (pitcher) who both went to the New York Mets
- Kevin Correia who went to the Pittsburgh Pirates
- Yorvit Torrealba who went to the Texas Rangers
- Miguel Tejada who went to the San Francisco Giants

== Spring training ==
=== Game log ===
The Padres played at Peoria Sports Complex in Peoria, AZ. The Padres' spring training schedule is on the website below.

== Regular season ==
The Padres offense started the season being shut out seven times in April, a major league record according to the Elias Sports Bureau. Heath Bell converted his first seven save opportunities of the season, which tied him with Trevor Hoffman for the club record of 41 consecutive successful save conversions. The streak also tied him with Hoffman and Rod Beck for fourth-longest in MLB history. Bell blew his next save opportunity, a 3–0 lead, after he opened the ninth inning by walking the first two batters, and third baseman Chase Headley made a two-out, two-run throwing error to tie the game. On May 14, Bell recorded his 100th career save in a 9–7 win over the Colorado Rockies.

Mat Latos lost his first four starts, extending his losing streak to nine consecutive starts dating back to 2010. The streak ties the longest streak in Padres history, held by Andy Benes and Dennis Rasmussen. Latos had a no-decision in his next start after the bullpen blew a save opportunity, preventing him from earning a win. He would lose another decision for a 10-game losing streak that was one shy of the club record held by Gary Ross. Latos won on May 15 against the Colorado Rockies to end his losing streak.

On June 20, former Padres first baseman Adrián González went 3 for 5 with a double and 3 RBI (all in the 10-run Boston 7th inning) in his first career game against San Diego in a 14–5 Red Sox victory in Fenway Park. The Padres were 6-9 in interleague play in 2011.

In May The San Diego Union-Tribune wrote that star minor league first baseman Anthony Rizzo's debut with the Padres might be delayed despite the club's hitting deficiencies due to cost considerations created by the "Super Two" exception for salary arbitration eligibility. The Padres cited Rizzo's lack of experience above Double-A and his limited exposure to left-handed pitching as benefits of his continuing to play in Tucson. He was called up to the majors after hitting .365 with 16 homers and 63 RBI in 200 at-bats in Tucson. In his debut on June 9, against the Washington Nationals, Rizzo struck out in his first at bat, but then proceeded to hit a triple and score a run, helping the Padres to a 7–3 victory. He hit his first home run on June 11 against John Lannan. After three games he was 3-for-7 with a double, triple and a home run, while demonstrated patience in drawing four walks for a .667 on-base percentage (OBP).

The Padres' pitcher Cory Luebke was added to the rotation on June 22, 2011 as a previous 5-spot pitcher. Wade LeBlanc was optioned after a loss to the Red Sox. He went 5 innings and struck out 6 in his first start of 2011 in an eventual 4-1 win.

On July 9 against the Los Angeles Dodgers, Luke Gregerson entered the game in the ninth inning after Aaron Harang, Josh Spence, Chad Qualls, and Mike Adams combined to pitch eight innings without allowing a hit. Gregerson retired the first two hitters before a double by Juan Uribe on a one ball and two strike count broke up the no hitter. Dioner Navarro then hit a single off Gregerson to score the winning run for the Dodgers. This was the closest the Padres have come to pitching a no-hitter since Steve Arlin in 1972. The Padres would be the last MLB team to get a no-hitter with the first coming on April 9th, 2021 when San Diego native Joe Musgrove threw the teams first no-hitter in a 3-0 win over the Texas Rangers.

Bell was the only Padre selected for the 2011 All-Star Game. With the team 12 games under .500 coming out of the All-Star break, general manager Jed Hoyer said the Padres would pursue a long-term contract with Bell if they did not get a desirable trade offer for him.

On July 22, Rizzo was demoted back to Triple-A, and Kyle Blanks was promoted. Rizzo had struggled with only a .143 batting average and 1 home run, striking out 36 times in 98 at-bats. Hoyer said Rizzo "worked hard, never made excuses, and endeared himself to his teammates" during his initial stint in the majors.

At the non-waiver trade deadline on July 31, Adams was traded to the Texas Rangers for a pair of young Double-A starting pitchers—right-hander Joe Wieland and left-hander Robbie Erlin. Also, Ryan Ludwick was traded to the Pittsburgh Pirates for a player to be named later or cash considerations. Adams had appeared in 33 of the Padres' first 46 wins with 23 holds as the setup man for Bell. Adams was 3-1 with a 1.13 ERA and opposing hitters were batting only .155 against him, striking out 49 times in 48 innings. Ludwick was hitting only .238, but he had 11 homers and 64 RBI and 42 runs scored and was accounting for 25.3 percent of the Padres' runs. By comparison, Adrián González accounted for 23.6 percent of the Padres' runs in 2010. Bell was not traded, but Hoyer admitted Bell's greatest value to the team might come as a free agent if Bell refuses salary arbitration in the offseason and signs elsewhere—the Padres would receive two first-round draft picks in June 2012 as compensation.

The Padres retired number 51 in honor of Trevor Hoffman's at Petco Park in a pre-game ceremony on August 21, 2011, against the Florida Marlins. The ceremony was patterned after the show This Is Your Life, featuring over 40 of Hoffman's former teammates and coaches. Brian Johnson, the lead singer on AC/DC's "Hells Bells", paid tribute in a video to Hoffman for "rocking the mound". In a nod to Hoffman's late father, Ed, the Padres presented Hoffman with a mint condition 1958 Cadillac convertible; his father loved driving his family in a convertible. For the National Anthem, the Padres played a video of Ed singing "The Star-Spangled Banner" at Fenway Park on Opening Day in 1981 when Trevor's brother, Glenn, was the starting shortstop for the Boston Red Sox. Following the ceremony, Bell blew a 3–2 lead against the Marlins after allowing a solo home run to Mike Cameron with two outs in the ninth. However, Nick Hundley hit a leadoff triple in the bottom of the ninth, and would eventually score on a Will Venable single. It was Hundley's fifth triple of the season, tying the Padres single season record for triples by a catcher set by Benito Santiago in 1990. It was also Hundley's fourth triple in his last six games. After the game, Bell said, "I guess it's one of those things, on Trevor Hoffman day, only he should get the save, I guess."

The Padres finished with a 71–91 record while hitting a major league-low 91 home runs and finishing last in the National League (and next to last in MLB) in batting average (.237) and OPS (.653). They scored the third fewest runs in MLB. No player on their active roster in the season finale hit 10 major-league home runs in 2011. The team led the Major Leagues in stolen bases, and Cameron Maybin was the ninth player in Padres history to steal 40 bases. He hit .264 with nine home runs and 40 RBIs and was the Padres' nominee for the Hank Aaron Award. The Union-Tribune praised Maybin's defense and called his acquisition "[o]ne of the best trades in Padres history" and named him the team's MVP. The Union-Tribune also wrote that Jesús Guzmán's line-drive hitting style was perfectly suited to the Padres' home at Petco Park, and he emerged as the team's best hitter. However, the Padres were shut out 19 times during the season. Hitting coach Randy Ready was fired after the end of the season. Since moving to Petco Park in 2004, the Padres have fired four hitting coaches, and another resigned.

=== Season standings ===
==== National League West ====
NL West
Team	W	L	Pct.	GB	Home	Road
Arizona Diamondbacks	94	68	.580	—	51‍–‍30	43‍–‍38
San Francisco Giants	86	76	.531	8	46‍–‍35	40‍–‍41
Los Angeles Dodgers	82	79	.509	11½	42‍–‍39	40‍–‍40
Colorado Rockies	73	89	.451	21	38‍–‍43	35‍–‍46
San Diego Padres	71	91	.438	23	35‍–‍46	36‍–‍45

==== National League Wild Card ====
Division leaders
Team	W	L	Pct.
Philadelphia Phillies	102	60	.630
Milwaukee Brewers	96	66	.593
Arizona Diamondbacks	94	68	.580

Wild Card team (Top team qualifies for postseason)
Team	W	L	Pct.	GB
St. Louis Cardinals	90	72	.556	—
Atlanta Braves	89	73	.549	1
San Francisco Giants	86	76	.531	4
Los Angeles Dodgers	82	79	.509	7½
Washington Nationals	80	81	.497	9½
Cincinnati Reds	79	83	.488	11
New York Mets	77	85	.475	13
Colorado Rockies	73	89	.451	17
Florida Marlins	72	90	.444	18
Pittsburgh Pirates	72	90	.444	18
Chicago Cubs	71	91	.438	19
San Diego Padres	71	91	.438	19
Houston Astros	56	106	.346	34

=== Record vs. opponents ===
2011 National League record Source: MLB Standings Grid – 2011
Team	AZ	ATL	CHC	CIN	COL	FLA	HOU	LAD	MIL	NYM	PHI	PIT	SD	SF	STL	WSH	AL
Arizona	–	2–3	3–4	4–2	13–5	5–2	6–1	10–8	4–3	3–3	3–3	3–3	11–7	9–9	3–4	5–3	10–8
Atlanta	3–2	–	4–3	3–3	6–2	12–6	5–1	2–5	5–3	9–9	6–12	4–2	4–5	6–1	1–5	9–9	10–5
Chicago	4–3	3–4	–	7–11	2–4	3–3	8–7	3–3	6–10	4–2	2–5	8–8	3–3	5–4	5–10	3–4	5–10
Cincinnati	2–4	3–3	11–7	–	3–4	3–3	9–6	4–2	8–8	2–5	1–7	5–10	4–2	5–2	9–6	4–2	7–11
Colorado	5–13	2–6	4–2	4–3	–	3–3	5–2	9–9	3–6	5–2	1–4	4–3	9–9	5–13	2–4	4–3	8–7
Florida	2–5	6–12	3–3	3–3	3–3	–	6–1	3–3	0–7	9–9	6–12	6–0	0–7	4–2	2–6	11–7	8–10
Houston	1–6	1–5	7–8	6–9	2–5	1–6	–	4–5	3–12	3–3	2–4	7–11	3–5	4–3	5–10	3–3	4–11
Los Angeles	8–10	5–2	3–3	2–4	9–9	3–3	5–4	–	2–4	2–5	1–5	6–2	13–5	9–9	4–3	4–2	6–9
Milwaukee	3–4	3–5	10–6	8–8	6–3	7–0	12–3	4–2	–	4–2	3–4	12–3	3–2	3–3	9–9	3–3	6–9
New York	3–3	9–9	2–4	5–2	2–5	9–9	3–3	5–2	2–4	–	7–11	4–4	4–3	2–4	3–3	8–10	9–9
Philadelphia	3–3	12–6	5–2	7–1	4–1	12–6	4–2	5–1	4–3	11–7	–	4–2	7–1	4–3	3–6	8–10	9–6
Pittsburgh	3–3	2–4	8–8	10–5	3–4	0–6	11–7	2–6	3–12	4–4	2–4	–	2–4	3–3	7–9	4–4	8–7
San Diego	7–11	5–4	3–3	2–4	9–9	7–0	5–3	5–13	2–3	3–4	1–7	4–2	–	6–12	3–3	3–4	6–9
San Francisco	9–9	1–6	4–5	2–5	13–5	2–4	3–4	9–9	3–3	4–2	3–4	3–3	12–6	–	5–2	3–4	10–5
St. Louis	4–3	5–1	10–5	6–9	4–2	6–2	10–5	3–4	9–9	3–3	6–3	9–7	3–3	2–5	–	2–4	8–7
Washington	3–5	9–9	4–3	2–4	3–4	7–11	3–3	2–4	3–3	10–8	10–8	4–4	4–3	4–3	4–2	–	8–7

=== Roster ===
2011 San Diego Padres
Roster
Pitchers: 37 Mike Adams; 45 Anthony Bass; 21 Heath Bell; 58 Brad Brach; 37 Andrew Carpenter; 43 Samuel Deduno; 39 Ernesto Frieri; 59 Jeff Fulchino; 57 Luke Gregerson; 40 Erik Hamren; 41 Aaron Harang; 38 Mat Latos; 49 Wade LeBlanc; 52 Cory Luebke; 26 Dustin Moseley; 34 Pat Neshek; 50 Chad Qualls; 33 Clayton Richard; 55 Evan Scribner; 44 Josh Spence; 46 Tim Stauffer; 54 Joe Thatcher	Catchers: 4 Nick Hundley; 32 Rob Johnson; 29 Luis Martínez; 16 Kyle Phillips; Infielders: 8 Jason Bartlett; 2 Everth Cabrera; 3 Jorge Cantú; 22 James Darnell; 12 Logan Forsythe; 14 Alberto González; 15 Jesús Guzmán; 11 Brad Hawpe; 7 Chase Headley; 1 Orlando Hudson; 3 Andy Parrino; 27 Anthony Rizzo	Outfielders: 88 Kyle Blanks; 28 Aaron Cunningham; 13 Chris Denorfia; 47 Jeremy Hermida; 18 Cedric Hunter; 47 Ryan Ludwick; 24 Cameron Maybin; 9 Eric Patterson; 15,23 Blake Tekotte; 25 Will Venable	Manager: 20 Bud Black; Coaches: 48 Darrel Akerfelds (bullpen); 36 Darren Balsley (pitching); 81 Griffin Benedict (bullpen catcher); 80 Justin Hatcher (bullpen catcher); 30 Glenn Hoffman (third base); 71 Mark Merila (bullpen catcher); 5 Randy Ready (hitting); 17 Rick Renteria (bench); 10 Dave Roberts (first base)

== Player stats ==
=== Batting ===
Note: G = Games played; AB = At bats; R = Runs; H = Hits; 2B = Doubles; 3B = Triples; HR = Home runs; RBI = Runs batted in; SB = Stolen bases; BB = Walks; AVG = Batting average; SLG = Slugging average

Player	G	AB	R	H	2B	3B	HR	RBI	SB	BB	AVG	SLG
Jason Bartlett	139	554	61	136	22	3	2	40	23	48	.245	.307
Cameron Maybin	137	516	82	136	24	8	9	40	40	44	.264	.393
Orlando Hudson	119	398	54	98	15	3	7	43	19	49	.246	.352
Chase Headley	113	381	43	110	28	1	4	44	13	52	.289	.399
Ryan Ludwick	101	378	42	90	18	0	11	64	1	32	.238	.373
Will Venable	121	370	49	91	14	7	9	44	26	31	.246	.395
Chris Denorfia	111	307	38	85	13	2	5	19	11	28	.277	.381
Nick Hundley	82	281	34	81	16	5	9	29	1	22	.288	.477
Jesús Guzmán	76	247	33	77	22	2	5	44	9	22	.312	.478
Alberto González	102	247	18	53	10	2	1	32	1	13	.215	.283
Brad Hawpe	62	195	19	45	10	0	4	19	0	19	.231	.344
Rob Johnson	67	179	9	34	6	1	3	16	3	14	.190	.285
Kyle Blanks	55	170	21	39	7	1	7	26	2	16	.229	.406
Logan Forsythe	62	150	12	32	9	1	0	12	3	12	.213	.287
Jorge Cantú	57	144	8	28	4	0	3	16	0	7	.194	.285
Anthony Rizzo	49	128	9	18	8	1	1	9	2	21	.141	.242
Aaron Cunningham	52	90	12	16	6	1	3	9	1	9	.178	.367
Eric Patterson	47	89	8	16	2	1	2	8	8	12	.180	.292
Kyle Phillips	36	76	9	13	3	0	2	10	0	8	.171	.289
Luis Martinez	22	59	7	12	1	1	1	10	1	8	.203	.305
James Darnell	18	45	2	10	2	0	1	7	1	5	.222	.333
Andy Parrino	24	44	3	8	1	0	0	4	1	9	.182	.205
Jeremy Hermida	20	40	3	9	2	1	1	6	0	7	.225	.400
Blake Tekotte	19	34	1	6	1	1	0	1	2	4	.176	.265
Everth Cabrera	2	8	1	1	0	0	0	0	2	1	.125	.125
Cedric Hunter	6	4	1	1	0	0	0	0	0	1	.250	.250
Pitcher totals	162	283	14	39	3	0	1	11	0	7	.138	.159
Team totals	162	5417	593	1284	247	42	91	563	170	501	.237	.349

=== Pitching ===
Note: W = Wins; L = Losses; ERA = Earned run average; G = Games pitched; GS = Games started; SV = Saves; IP = Innings pitched; H = Hits allowed; R = Runs allowed; ER = Earned runs allowed; BB = Walks allowed; SO = Strikeouts

Player	W	L	ERA	G	GS	SV	IP	H	R	ER	BB	SO
Mat Latos	9	14	3.47	31	31	0	194.1	168	82	75	62	185
Tim Stauffer	9	12	3.73	31	31	0	185.2	180	81	77	53	128
Aaron Harang	14	7	3.64	28	28	0	170.2	175	73	69	58	124
Cory Luebke	6	10	3.29	46	17	0	139.2	105	54	51	44	154
Dustin Moseley	3	10	3.30	20	20	0	120.0	117	59	44	36	64
Clayton Richard	5	9	3.88	18	18	0	99.2	104	52	43	38	53
Wade LeBlanc	5	6	4.63	14	14	0	79.2	84	42	41	28	51
Chad Qualls	6	8	3.51	77	0	0	74.1	73	30	29	20	43
Ernesto Frieri	1	2	2.71	59	0	0	63.0	51	21	19	34	76
Heath Bell	3	4	2.44	64	0	43	62.2	51	20	17	21	51
Luke Gregerson	3	3	2.75	61	0	0	55.2	57	23	17	19	34
Anthony Bass	2	0	1.68	27	3	0	48.1	41	9	9	21	24
Mike Adams	3	1	1.13	48	0	1	48.0	26	7	6	9	49
Josh Spence	0	2	2.73	40	0	0	29.2	14	9	9	19	31
Pat Neshek	1	1	4.01	25	0	0	24.2	19	12	11	22	20
Evan Scribner	0	0	7.07	10	0	0	14.0	18	11	11	4	10
Erik Hamren	1	0	4.38	14	0	0	12.1	10	7	6	9	10
Joe Thatcher	0	0	4.50	18	0	0	10.0	8	5	5	7	9
Brad Brach	0	2	5.14	9	0	0	7.0	9	5	4	7	11
Andrew Carpenter	0	0	8.44	6	0	0	5.1	6	5	5	3	6
Sam Deduno	0	0	3.00	2	0	0	3.0	5	1	1	3	4
Jeff Fulchino	0	0	16.20	3	0	0	1.2	3	3	3	4	2
Team totals	71	91	3.42	162	162	44	1449.1	1324	611	551	521	1139

== Farm system ==
Level	Team	League	Manager
AAA	Tucson Padres	Pacific Coast League	Terry Kennedy
AA	San Antonio Missions	Texas League	Doug Dascenzo
A	Lake Elsinore Storm	California League	Carlos Lezcano
A	Fort Wayne TinCaps	Midwest League	Shawn Wooten
A-Short Season	Eugene Emeralds	Northwest League	Pat Murphy
Rookie	AZL Padres	Arizona League	Jim Gabella

LEAGUE CHAMPIONS: San Antonio, Lake Elsinore
