= Jeb =

Jeb is a masculine given name or nickname. It can be derived from the initials "J. E. B.", or from "Jebediah". It may refer to:

== People ==
=== Given name ===
- Jeb Bardon (born 1973), American politician
- Jeb Bishop (born 1962), American musician
- Jeb Corliss (born 1976), American BASE jumper
- Jeb Flesch (born 1969), American football player
- Jeb Hensarling (born 1957), American politician
- Jeb Huckeba (born 1982), American football player
- Jeb Livingood, American essayist, short story writer, editor, and academic
- Jeb Loy Nichols, American musician
- Jebediah Jeb Putzier (born 1979), American National Football League player
- Jeb Sharp, American radio journalist
- Jeb Stuart Magruder (1934-2014), American businessman and civil servant convicted of conspiracy in the Watergate affair
- Jeb Stuart (writer) (born 1956), American film director, producer and screenwriter
- Jeb Terry (born 1981), American football player

=== Nickname ===
- John Jeb Blount (born 1954), American National Football League quarterback
- Joseph Jeb Bradley (born 1952), American politician
- John Jeb Brovsky (born 1988), American soccer player
- J. E. B. Seely, 1st Baron Mottistone (1868–1947), British soldier and politician
- John Jeb Burton (born 1992), American racing driver
- John Ellis "Jeb" Bush (born 1953), American politician, former governor of Florida
- George Jeb Spaulding (born 1952), American politician
- J. E. B. Stuart (1833–1864), American (Confederate) general
- Jens "Jeb" Bergensten (born 1979), Swedish video game designer

== Fictional characters ==
- Jeb, in the television series VR Troopers
- Jeb Cain, in the television series Tin Man
- Jeb Batchelder, in the Maximum Ride novels of James Patterson
- Jebediah Guthrie, a Marvel Comics mutant
- Jebediah Kerman, from the video game Kerbal Space Program
- Jebediah Springfield, the founder of Springfield from the television series "The Simpsons"
- Jeb McKettrick, in the novel Secondhand Bride by Linda Lael Miller
- Jeb Jab, in the YouTube series Scott the Woz
- Jeb (Jebez) Hawkes, from the soap opera Dark Shadows
- Jebediah Brown, mentioned in Call of Duty's Zombies storyline

== See also ==
- Jeb (disambiguation)
- Jeb Stuart (disambiguation)
- Jed (disambiguation)
