= Ebanks =

Ebanks is an English surname. Notable people with the surname include:

- Ambuyah Ebanks (born c. 1985), Miss Cayman Islands Pageant 2006 winner
- Derrin Ebanks (born 1988), Caymanian footballer
- Devin Ebanks (born 1989), American basketball player
- Georgette Ebanks (1927–2023), Caymanian women's rights activist
- Jedd Ebanks (born 1988), Caymanian footballer
- Joe Ebanks (born c. 1985), American poker player
- Jorge Ebanks (born 1986), Caymanian basketball player
- Mark Ebanks (born 1990), Caymanian footballer
- Raymond Ebanks (born 1970), Finnish rapper
- Ronald Ebanks (born 1983), Caymanian cricketer
- Ryan Ebanks (born 1984), Caymanian cricketer
- Selita Ebanks (born 1983), Caymanian fashion model
- Sharon Ebanks (born 1967/68), former member of the British National Party and one of the founder members of the New Nationalist Party
- Wayne Ebanks (born 1964), English footballer

== See also ==
- Sylvan Ebanks-Blake (born 1986), English footballer who plays striker for Wolverhampton Wanderers F.C.
- Ethan Ebanks-Landell (born 1992), English footballer who plays defender
