= Kyle Blanks =

American baseball player (born 1986)

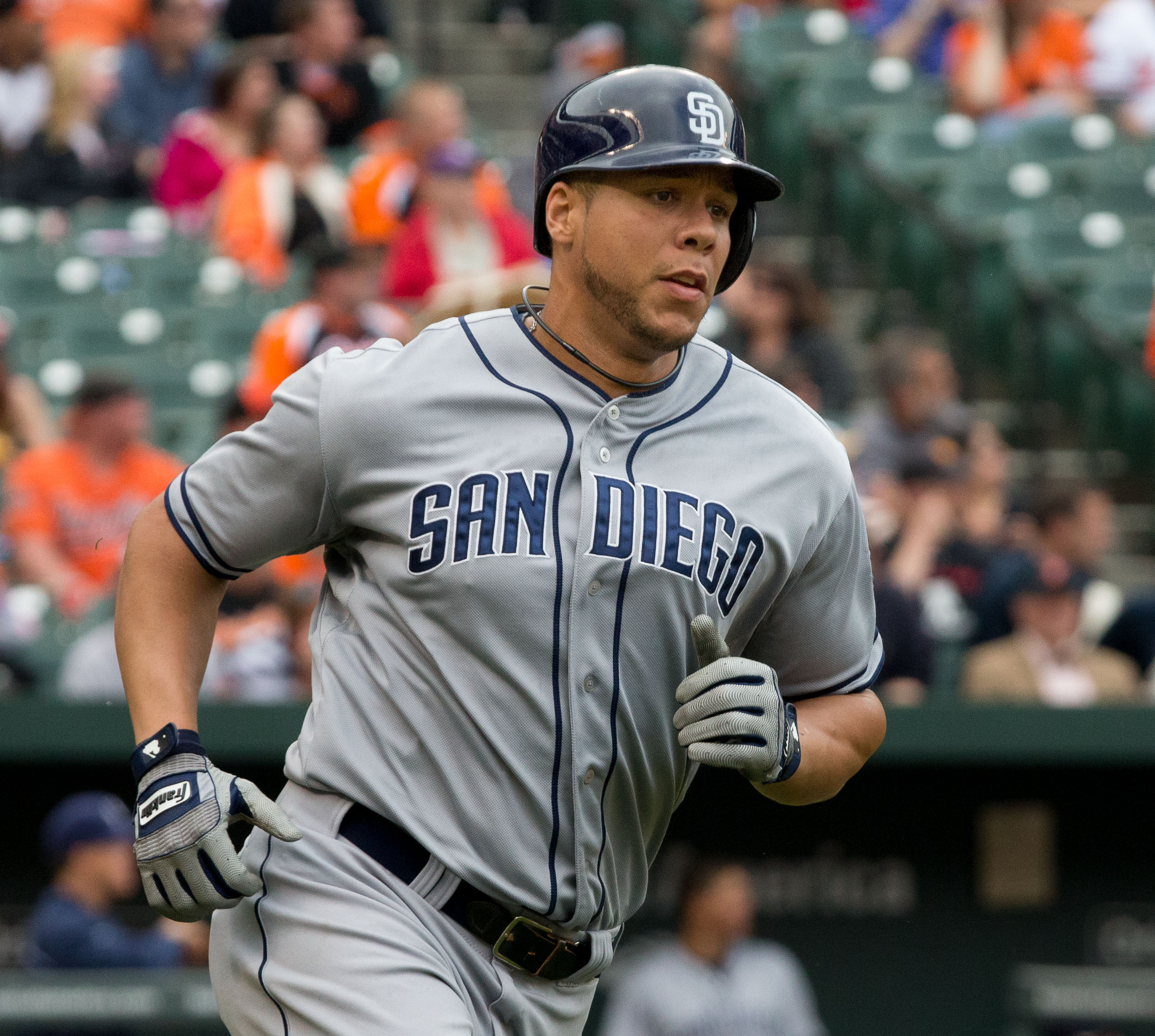
- Blanks with the San Diego Padres
- Outfielder / First baseman
- Born: September 11, 1986 (age 39); Souderton, Pennsylvania, U.S.
- Batted: Right Threw: Right

MLB debut
- June 19, 2009, for the San Diego Padres

Last MLB appearance
- June 16, 2015, for the Texas Rangers

MLB statistics
- Batting average: .241
- Home runs: 33
- Runs batted in: 111
- Stats at Baseball Reference

Teams
- San Diego Padres (2009–2014); Oakland Athletics (2014); Texas Rangers (2015)

Kyle Nathaniel Blanks (born September 11, 1986) is an American former professional baseball outfielder and first baseman. He played in Major League Baseball (MLB) for the San Diego Padres, Oakland Athletics, and Texas Rangers. Blanks wore the unusual uniform number 88 throughout his MLB career. Listed at 6 feet 6 inches (1.98 m) and 285 pounds (129 kg), he batted and threw right-handed.

== Early life ==
Blanks was born in Souderton, Pennsylvania and grew up in Moriarty, New Mexico where he was a stand-out for the Moriarty High Pintos. Blanks attended Yavapai College.

== Professional career ==
=== San Diego Padres ===
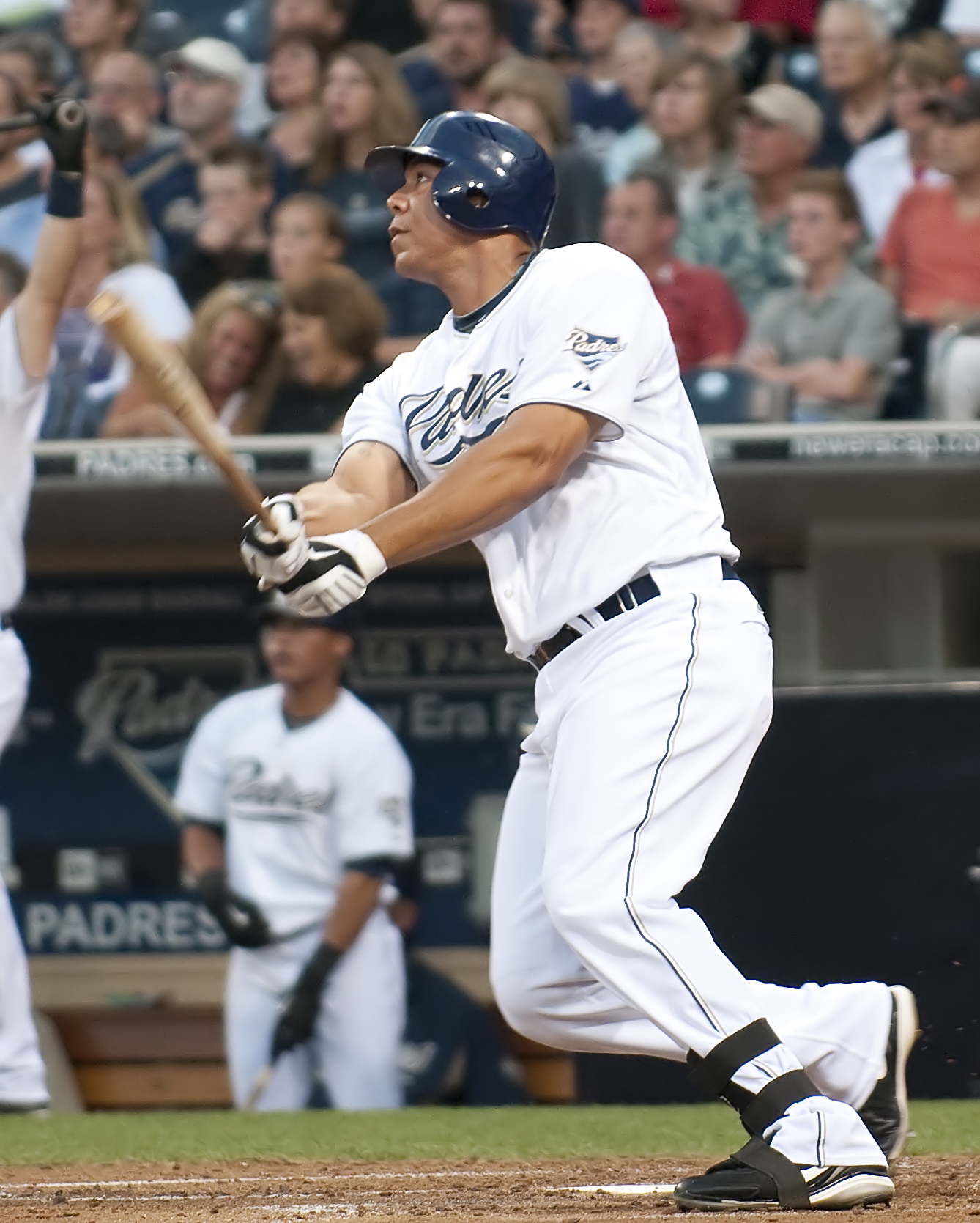
Blanks hitting his 6th career home run

Blanks was selected by San Diego Padres in the 42nd round (1241st overall) of the 2004 Major League Baseball draft. He was the Padres' Minor League Player of the Year in 2008. Though he was a standout first baseman, he started playing in the outfield in April 2009. He was called up to the majors for the first time after only 66 Triple-A games when Cliff Floyd was placed on the disabled list on June 19, 2009. He played left field for the Padres after only 15 games in the outfield for Portland. He hit 10 home runs in 148 at bats in his first MLB season as he continued to be the Padres' highest-rated prospect. He hit only .150 in his first 40 at-bats, but finished with 10 homers with a .287 average. His season ended on August 28 with a case of plantar fasciitis. During the offseason, the Padres traded away third baseman Kevin Kouzmanoff in order to move Chase Headley to the infield to open a position for Blanks in left field.

Blanks began the 2010 season as the Padres cleanup hitter behind Adrián González. Blanks' season ended in May with an elbow that required reconstructive surgery. He finished batting only .157 with three homers, 15 RBI and an alarming 46 strikeouts in 102 at-bats. After González was traded in the offseason, Padres General Manager Jed Hoyer expected either newly acquired Anthony Rizzo or Blanks to eventually be the Padres starting first baseman.

Blanks started 2011 on the disabled list. He played 78 games at Double-A San Antonio and Triple-A Tucson, hitting a combined .312 with 15 home runs and 62 RBI. He was promoted to San Diego and Anthony Rizzo was sent down to Tucson on July 22. He finished the season hitting .229 with seven home runs and 26 RBI in 170 at bats.

Hoyer believed that Rizzo would be the starting first baseman for the Padres in 2012. The San Diego Union-Tribune projected Jesús Guzmán and Blanks as options for left field. However, he was lost for the season in April after surgery to repair a significant tear in the labrum of his non-throwing shoulder.

Blanks played well during 2013 spring training, but began the year with Tucson with left field occupied by Carlos Quentin and first base occupied by Yonder Alonso. Blanks was called up on April 14 when Quentin began serving a suspension for a brawl. He remained with the club after Quentin's return as an injury to Cameron Maybin opened up a spot in the outfield. Blanks also picked up a number of starts at first base in June while Yonder Alonso was on the disabled list with a broken hand. Blanks himself went to the disabled list on July 12 with tendinitis in his left heel. He returned on August 31 after a rehab assignment and spent the rest of the season with the club. For the year, Blanks set a career high with 88 games played and 71 starts. He hit .243 in 280 at-bats with 8 home runs.

Blanks was chosen to start the 2014 season in the minors. Blanks was called up on May 5, after Xavier Nady was designated for assignment. Blanks only played 5 games for the Padres in 2014, getting 2 hits in 10 at bats.

=== Oakland Athletics ===
On May 15, 2014, the Padres traded Blanks to the Oakland Athletics for Jake Goebbert and minor leaguer Ronald Herrera. He was designated for assignment on November 28, 2014.

=== Texas Rangers ===
On December 15, 2014, the Texas Rangers signed Blanks to a minor league contract with a base salary of $1 million, and $600,000 in performance related bonuses if he made the big league roster. Blanks appeared in 18 games for the Rangers in 2015, hitting .313 in 71 plate appearances.

=== San Francisco Giants ===
Blanks signed with the San Francisco Giants on a minor league contract in November 2015. Despite missing time in 2016 due to injury, the Giants re-signed Blanks to a minor league deal for the 2017 season. He was released on May 26, 2017.

=== Acereros de Monclova ===
On June 13, 2017, Blanks signed with the Acereros de Monclova of the Mexican League. He was released on June 22, after going 1-for-13 (.077) across three appearances.
