= Jeb (disambiguation) =

Jeb is a masculine given name or nickname.

Jeb or JEB may also refer to:

== People ==
- Jebediah, a variant of the given name Jedediah, shortened to "Jeb"
- James Ewell Brown Stuart (J.E.B. Stuart; 1833–1864), Confederate general, nicknamed "Jeb"
- Jens Bergensten, a video game developer known by his nickname "Jeb".
- John Ellis Bush (J.E.B.; born 1953), governor of Florida

== Groups, organizations ==
- Japan Evangelistic Band, a religious organization
- Joint Examining Board
- Junularo Esperantista Brita, an organization of Esperanto-speakers

== Other use ==
- Jeb (play), a 1946 play by Robert Ardrey
- The Journal of Experimental Biology
- Junctional epidermolysis bullosa (disambiguation)
- JEB Decompiler, a multi-architecture decompiler and reverse-engineering platform
- jeb, ISO 639-3 code for the Jebero language of Peru
- ¡Jeb!, the campaign slogan for Jeb Bush

== See also ==
- J.E.B. v. Alabama ex rel. T.B., a 1994 U.S. Supreme Court case on juror peremptory challenges
- Jeb Stuart (disambiguation)
- Jed (disambiguation)
