= Jedd =

Jedd is a given name. Notable people with the name include:

- Jedd Philo Clark Cottrill (1832–1889), American politician
- Jedd Ebanks (born 1988), Caymanian footballer
- Jedd Fisch (born 1976), American football coach
- Jedd Gardner (born 1988), Canadian football player
- Jedd Garet, American sculptor, painter and printmaker
- Jedd Gyorko (born 1988), American baseball player
- Jedd Hughes (born 1982), Australian singer-songwriter
- Jedd P. Ladd (1828–1894), American politician
- Jedd Novatt (born 1958), American sculptor

== See also ==
- Jed (given name)
