= Cedric Hunter (baseball) =

American baseball player (born 1988)

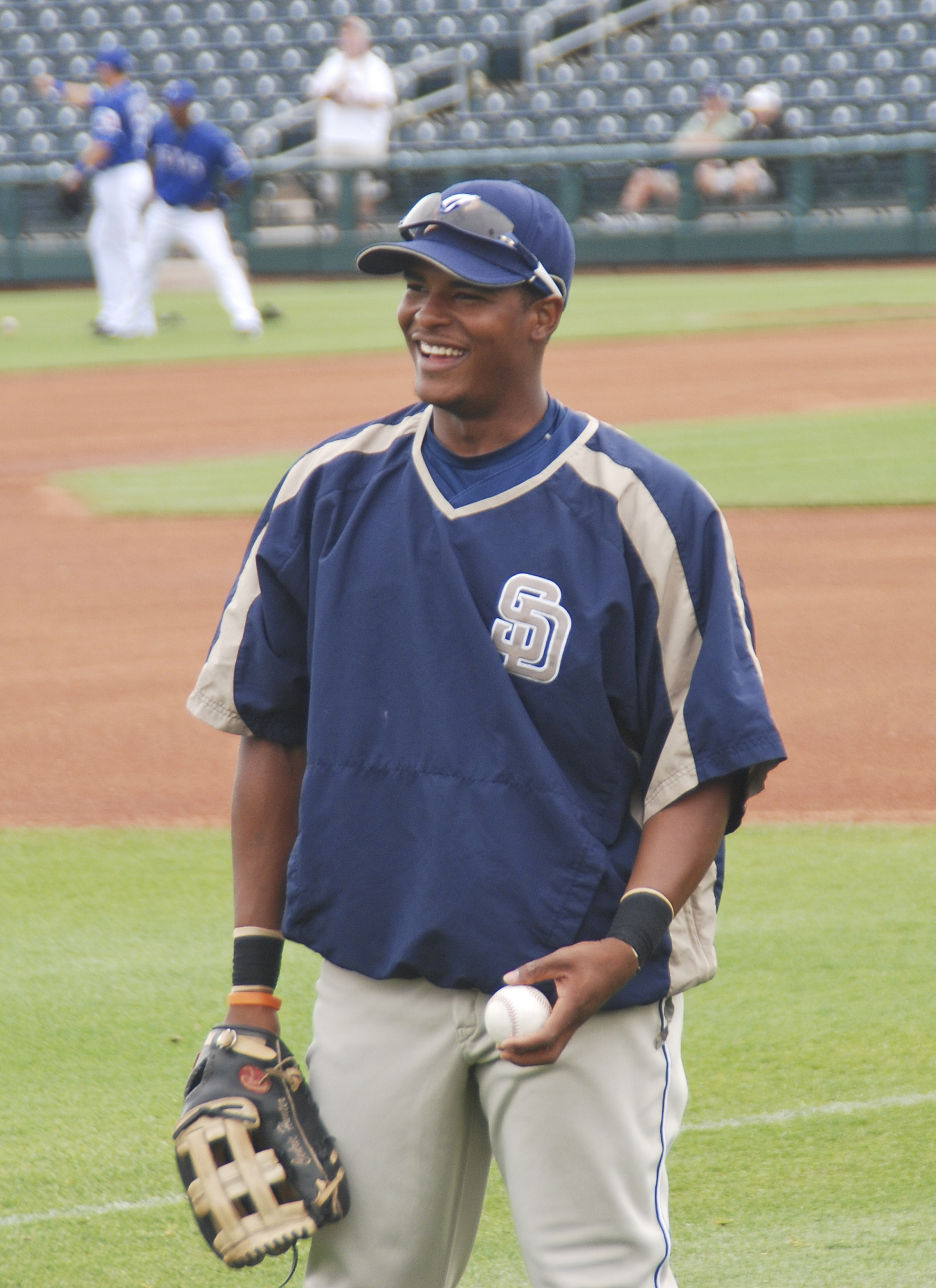
- Hunter with the San Diego Padres
- Center fielder
- Born: March 10, 1988 (age 38); Decatur, Georgia, U.S.
- Batted: Left Threw: Left

MLB debut
- March 31, 2011, for the San Diego Padres

Last MLB appearance
- April 17, 2016, for the Philadelphia Phillies

MLB statistics
- Batting average: .108
- Home runs: 1
- Runs batted in: 1
- Stats at Baseball Reference

Teams
- San Diego Padres (2011); Philadelphia Phillies (2016)

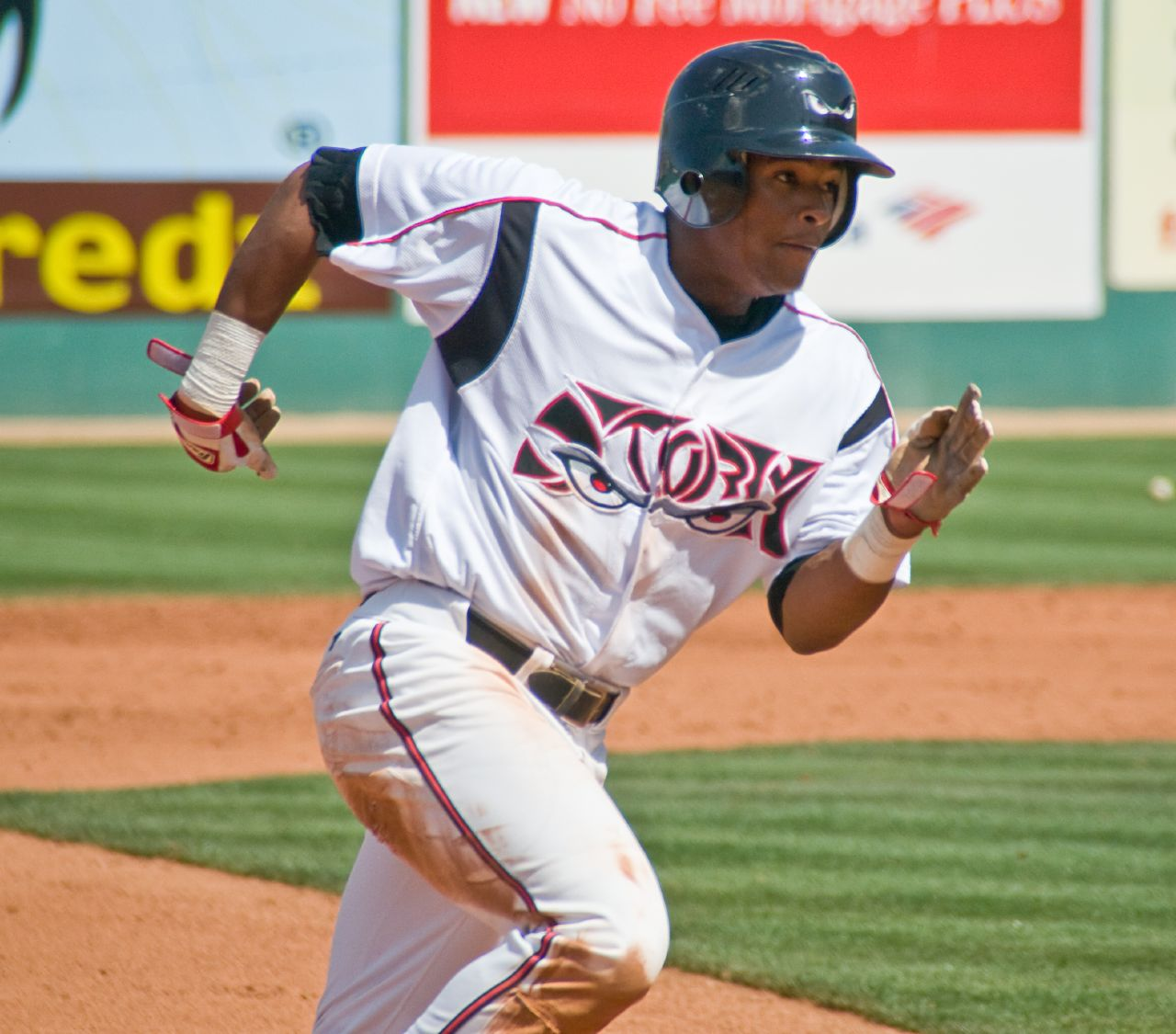
Hunter during his tenure with the Lake Elsinore Storm, Single-A affiliates of the San Diego Padres, in 2008

Cedric Scott Hunter (born March 10, 1988) is an American former professional baseball outfielder. He played in Major League Baseball (MLB) for the San Diego Padres and Philadelphia Phillies.

== Career ==
=== San Diego Padres ===
Hunter was selected by the San Diego Padres in the third round (93rd overall) of the 2006 Major League Baseball draft. As of 2009, scout.com ranked Hunter as the top prospect for the San Diego Padres.

Following the 2010 season, Hunter was added to the Padres' 40-man roster to protect him from the Rule 5 draft. On March 28, 2011, it was announced that he had made San Diego's Opening Day roster. During Opening Day on March 31, Hunter scored his first run as a Padre when playing against the St. Louis Cardinals, scoring from second base off a Nick Hundley single in the top of the 11th inning.

=== St. Louis Cardinals ===
On October 25, 2011, Hunter was claimed off waivers by the Oakland Athletics. On April 4, 2012, Oakland traded Hunter to the St. Louis Cardinals in exchange for future considerations. He was subsequently assigned to their Triple–A affiliate, the Memphis Redbirds.

=== Cleveland Indians ===
On November 20, 2012, Hunter signed a minor league contract with the Cleveland Indians that included an invitation to spring training. He split the 2013 campaign between the Double-A Akron Aeros and Triple-A Columbus Clippers, playing in 93 total games and batting a combined .282/.332/.509 with 14 home runs and 50 RBI.

=== Atlanta Braves ===
Hunter signed a minor league contract with the Atlanta Braves on February 14, 2014. He spent the year with the Double-A Mississippi Braves, hitting .295/.386/.495 with 14 home runs, 72 RBI, and 12 stolen bases across 120 games.

Hunter made 138 appearances for the Triple-A Gwinnett Braves in 2015, slashing .283/.331/.420 with 12 home runs, 77 RBI, and 11 stolen bases. He elected free agency on November 7, 2015.

=== Philadelphia Phillies ===
Hunter signed a minor league deal and was invited to spring training with the Philadelphia Phillies on January 4, 2016. Following injuries to multiple outfielders and an impressive spring training, Hunter made the Opening Day roster, projected to earn regular playing time in the outfield. On April 25, Hunter was removed from the 40-man roster and sent outright to the Triple-A Lehigh Valley IronPigs. After the 2016 season concluded, he became a free agent. However, on November 23, Hunter was suspended for 50 games after testing positive for amphetamine.

=== Cincinnati Reds ===
On April 5, 2017, Hunter signed a minor league contract with the Cincinnati Reds. In 14 games for the Triple–A Louisville Bats, he batted .300/.310/.475 with one home run and four RBI. Hunter was released by the Reds organization on June 26.

=== Kansas City T-Bones ===
On July 21, 2017, Hunter signed with the Kansas City T-Bones of the American Association of Independent Professional Baseball. In 43 appearances for Kansas City, Hunter batted .360/.421/.571 with nine home runs, 29 RBI, and five stolen bases.

=== Bravos de León ===
On March 11, 2018, Hunter signed with the Bravos de León of the Mexican League. In the first half of the season, he hit .308/.339/.520 with 12 home runs, 51 RBI, and seven stolen bases. In the second half of the season, Hunter slashed .332/.404/.519 with seven home runs, 38 RBI, and six stolen bases.

Hunter made 109 appearances for León in 2019, batting .328/.402/.572 with 19 home runs and 81 RBI. He was released by León on December 24, 2019.

== Awards ==
- 2008 Baseball America High Class-A All-Star
- 2008 California League postseason All-Star
- 2008 California League midseason All-Star
- 2006 Baseball America Rookie All-Star
- 2006 Arizona League postseason All-Star
- 2006 Arizona League Most Valuable Player
