= Jed (given name) =

Origin
- Origin: Hebrew

Other names
- Related names: Jedediah, Yedidiah

Jed is a masculine given name or nickname, usually of Jedediah.

== People ==
=== Politicians ===
- Jed Johnson (Oklahoma) (1888–1963), politician from Oklahoma
- Jed Johnson, Jr. (1939–1993), U.S. Representative from Oklahoma, son of Jed Johnson
- Jed Lipsky, politician from Vermont

=== In sports ===
- Jed Adcock (born 1985), Australian rules footballer
- Jed Anderson (born 1994), Australian rules footballer
- Jed Bews (born 1993), Australian rules footballer
- Jed Brown (born 1991), New Zealand rugby union player
- Jedidiah Jed Collins (born 1986), American National Football League player
- Jed Graef (born 1942), American swimmer and Olympic gold medalist
- Jed Hansen (born 1972), American Major League Baseball player
- Jed Holloway (born 1992), Australian rugby union footballer
- Jed Hoyer (born 1973), American executive vice-president and general manager of the Chicago Cubs Major League Baseball team
- Jed Hughes, American college football and National Football League coach
- Jadwiga Jędrzejowska (1912–1980), Polish tennis player nicknamed "Jed"
- Jed Jones, American tennis player, semifinalist in the 1906 US Open
- Jed Lamb (born 1992), Australian rules footballer
- Jed Lowrie (born 1984), American Major League Baseball player
- Jed Metcher (born 1990), Australian Grand Prix motorcycle racer
- Jed Ortmeyer (born 1978), American National Hockey League player
- Jed Prentice, American slalom canoer, world champion in 1989 and 1991
- Jed Roberts (born 1967), Canadian Football League player
- Jed Rowlands, New Zealand rugby union coach
- Jed Steer (born 1992), English football goalkeeper
- Jed Stugart (born 1970), American football coach, current head coach for the Lindenwood Lions
- Jed Wallace (born 1994), English footballer
- Jed Weaver (born 1976), American National Football League player
- John Edward Jed York (born c. 1980), American CEO of the San Francisco 49ers National Football League team
- Jedidiah Jed Zayner (born 1984), American soccer player

=== In arts and entertainment ===
- Jed Allan (1935–2019), American actor, particularly on soap operas
- Jed Brophy (born 1963), New Zealand film actor
- Jed Harris (1900–1979), Austrian-American theater producer and director and film writer born Jacob Hirsch Horowitz
- Jed Johnson (designer) (1948–1996), American interior designer and lover of Andy Warhol
- Jed Kurzel (born 1976), Australian film composer and musician
- Jed Mercurio (born 1966), British television writer, producer and director and novelist
- Jed Perl (born 1951), American art critic and author
- Jed Prouty (1879–1956), American film actor
- Jed Riffe, American filmmaker
- Jed Simon (born 1964), Canadian musician
- Jed Whedon (born 1974), American screenwriter and musician
- Jed Morgans (born 1998), British musician and record label executive

=== Academics ===
- Jed Buchwald, American historian, professor of history at Caltech
- Jed Rubenfeld, American Yale Law School professor and author

=== Other ===
- Jed S. Rakoff (born 1943), American federal judge
- Jed Smock, also known as Brother Jed (1943–2022), confrontational American evangelist and campus preacher

== Fictional characters ==
- Josiah Bartlet ("Jed"), on the American television series The West Wing
- Jed Clampett, on the American television series The Beverly Hillbillies
- Jedediah Leland ("Jed"), reporter in the film Citizen Kane
- Jemima Marshall ("Jed") (female), in John le Carrés novel The Night Manager and on the British TV mini-series of the same name
- Jed Olsen, the alias of Danny Johnson, who is The Ghost Face in the multiplatform video game Dead by Daylight
- Jed Stone, on the British soap opera Coronation Street
- Jed Wright, the only boss in the Xbox 360 video game demo Dead Rising 2: Case Zero

== See also ==
- Jedd, given name
