= Jesús Guzmán (baseball) =

Venezuelan baseball player (born 1984)

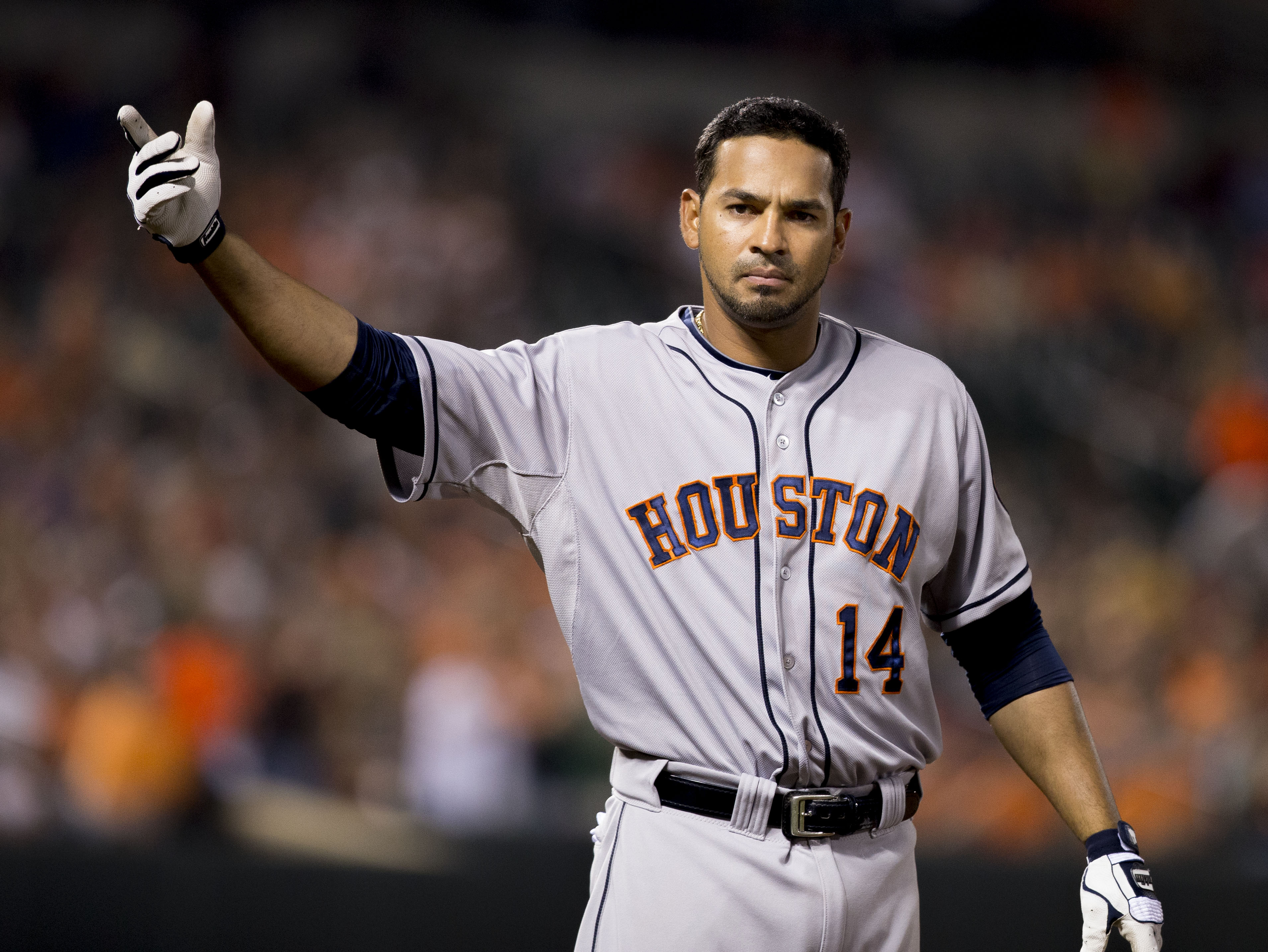
- Guzmán with the Houston Astros

Delfines de La Guaira – No. 15
- First baseman / Left fielder
- Born: June 14, 1984 (age 42); Sucre, Venezuela
- Batted: Right Threw: Right

Professional debut
- MLB: May 21, 2009, for the San Francisco Giants
- NPB: March 27, 2015, for the Hiroshima Toyo Carp

Last appearance
- MLB: September 24, 2014, for the Houston Astros
- NPB: August 30, 2015, for the Hiroshima Toyo Carp

MLB statistics
- Batting average: .247
- Home runs: 25
- Runs batted in: 136

NPB statistics
- Batting average: .230
- Home runs: 3
- Runs batted in: 12
- Stats at Baseball Reference

Teams
- San Francisco Giants (2009); San Diego Padres (2011–2013); Houston Astros (2014); Hiroshima Toyo Carp (2015)

Jesús Antonio Guzmán Álvarez (born June 14, 1984) is a Venezuelan professional baseball first baseman and left fielder for the Delfines de La Guaira of the Venezuelan Major League. He was signed by the Seattle Mariners in 2000 and played several seasons in minor league baseball before he appeared in the major leagues. He played in Major League Baseball (MLB) for the San Francisco Giants, San Diego Padres, and Houston Astros, and in Nippon Professional Baseball (NPB) for the Hiroshima Toyo Carp.

== Minor league career ==
Guzmán was signed by the Seattle Mariners as an undrafted free agent in 2000. He played in the Venezuelan leagues from 2001 through 2003 as a teenager. Guzmán came to the United States in 2004 and played with the Seattle High-A and Double-A affiliates through 2007 when he was granted free agency. The Oakland Athletics signed Guzmán as a minor league free agent, and he played for three Athletics minor league clubs in 2008 before again being granted free agency. He posted a .364 batting average with the Double-A Midland RockHounds, and a .237 average in a limited 59 at-bats with the Triple-A Sacramento River Cats, but his defense was a liability and he made 22 errors in 317 chances in 2008 while playing third and second base.

The San Francisco Giants signed Guzmán as a minor league free agent and invited him to spring training in 2009. He had an impressive spring, hitting .404 in Cactus League games, but in late March he was sent to learn to play first base in minor league games where his footwork on defense would not be as crucial. Guzmán began the 2009 season with the Triple-A Fresno Grizzlies, where he spent most of the season apart from a few short stints with the Major League club. He accumulated a .321 batting average and a .885 OPS in 115 games at Triple-A, playing first base almost exclusively.

Guzmán spent all of 2010 with the Giants' Triple-A club, where he posted nearly identical numbers to 2009, a .321 batting average and .886 OPS in 125 games, while playing mostly in left field and at third base.

== Major league career ==
=== San Francisco Giants ===
Guzmán was promoted from Triple-A and made his major league debut with the San Francisco Giants on May 21, 2009. He had 20 plate appearances in 12 games in 2009 spread over May, July, and September, making two starts at first base and one as a DH.

On January 22, 2010, Guzmán was designated for assignment by the San Francisco Giants to make room on the 40-man roster for Bengie Molina, and on February 4 Guzmán was outrighted to Triple-A where he spent all of 2010.

=== San Diego Padres ===
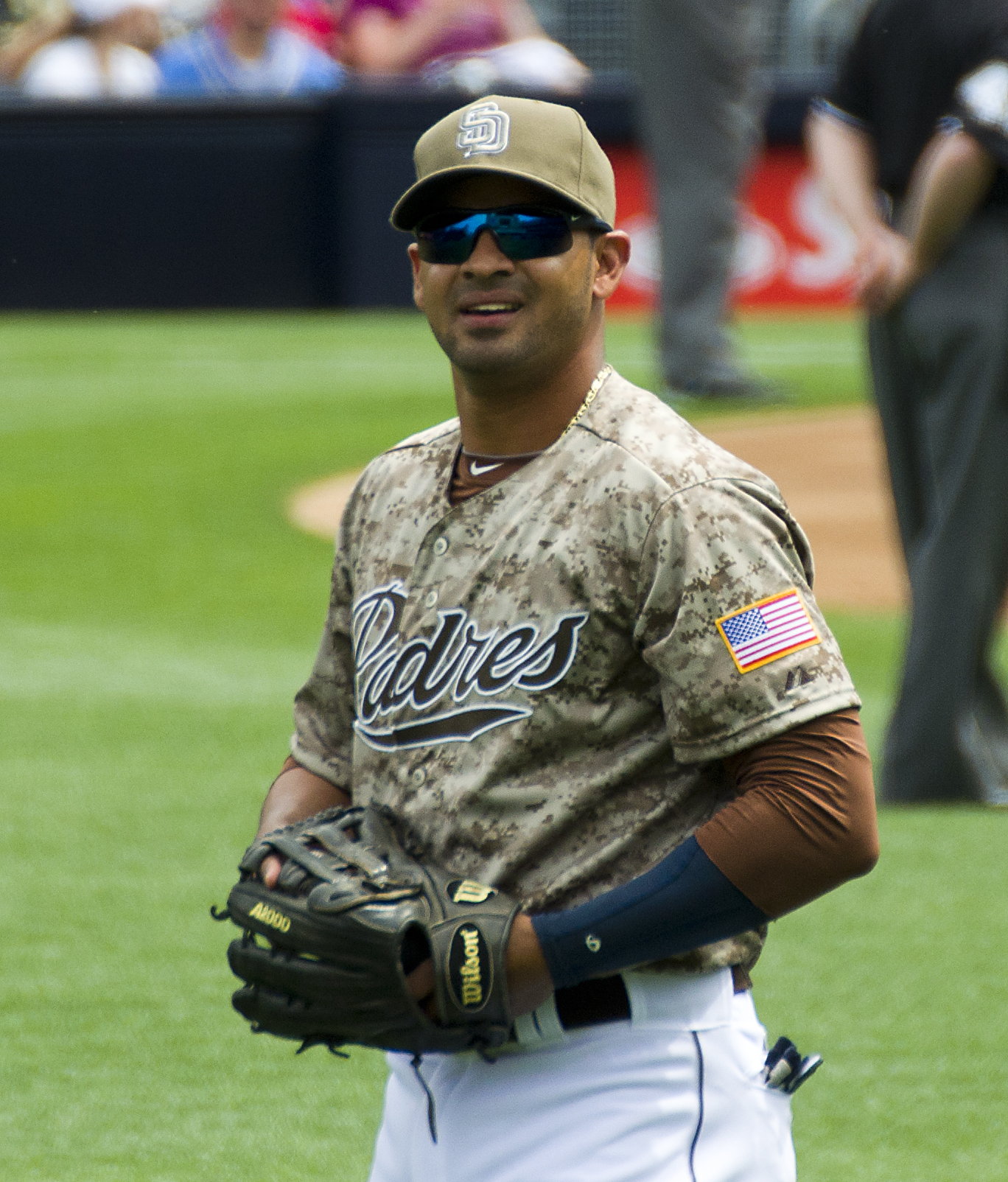
Guzmán during his tenure with the San Diego Padres in 2012

On November 20, Guzmán signed a minor league contract with the San Diego Padres. He had his contract purchased by San Diego on June 16, 2011. The San Diego Union-Tribune wrote that Guzmán line-drive hitting style was perfectly suited to the Padres' home at Petco Park, and he emerged as the best hitter on their 2011 team, hitting .312 with a .847 OPS in 247 at-bats. However, he was not a proficient fielder at either first base or left field. Padres general manager Jed Hoyer projected Guzmán as a second option at first base (behind Yonder Alonso) in 2012, otherwise he was a possibility in left field.

In 2012, Guzmán made the majority of starts in left field in April and May while Carlos Quentin was rehabbing a sore knee, and he returned to the position in September when Quentin's knee again bothered him. Otherwise, he made occasional starts at first and in right field, and he made 50 appearances as a pinch hitter. In a total of 321 plate appearances over 120 games, Guzmán hit .247 with a .737 OPS and 9 home runs.

Guzmán made the Padres 25-man roster in 2013 as a reserve outfielder and first baseman. He made 25 starts in left field, allowing Carlos Quentin to rest his knees early and late in the season. He also made 33 starts at first base, many in late June and early July when Yonder Alonso was out with a hand injury. Overall in 2013, Guzmán appeared in 126 games, and had 288 at-bats, including 48 as a pinch hitter. He hit .226 with a .675 OPS and 9 home runs.

=== Houston Astros ===
On December 18, 2013, Guzmán was traded to the Houston Astros in exchange for Ryan Jackson. He appeared in 69 games for the Astros, primarily at first base, and hit .188 with a .520 OPS. On October 9, 2014, Guzmán was removed from the 40–man roster and sent outright to the Triple–A Oklahoma City RedHawks. He elected free agency the following day.

=== Hiroshima Toyo Carp ===
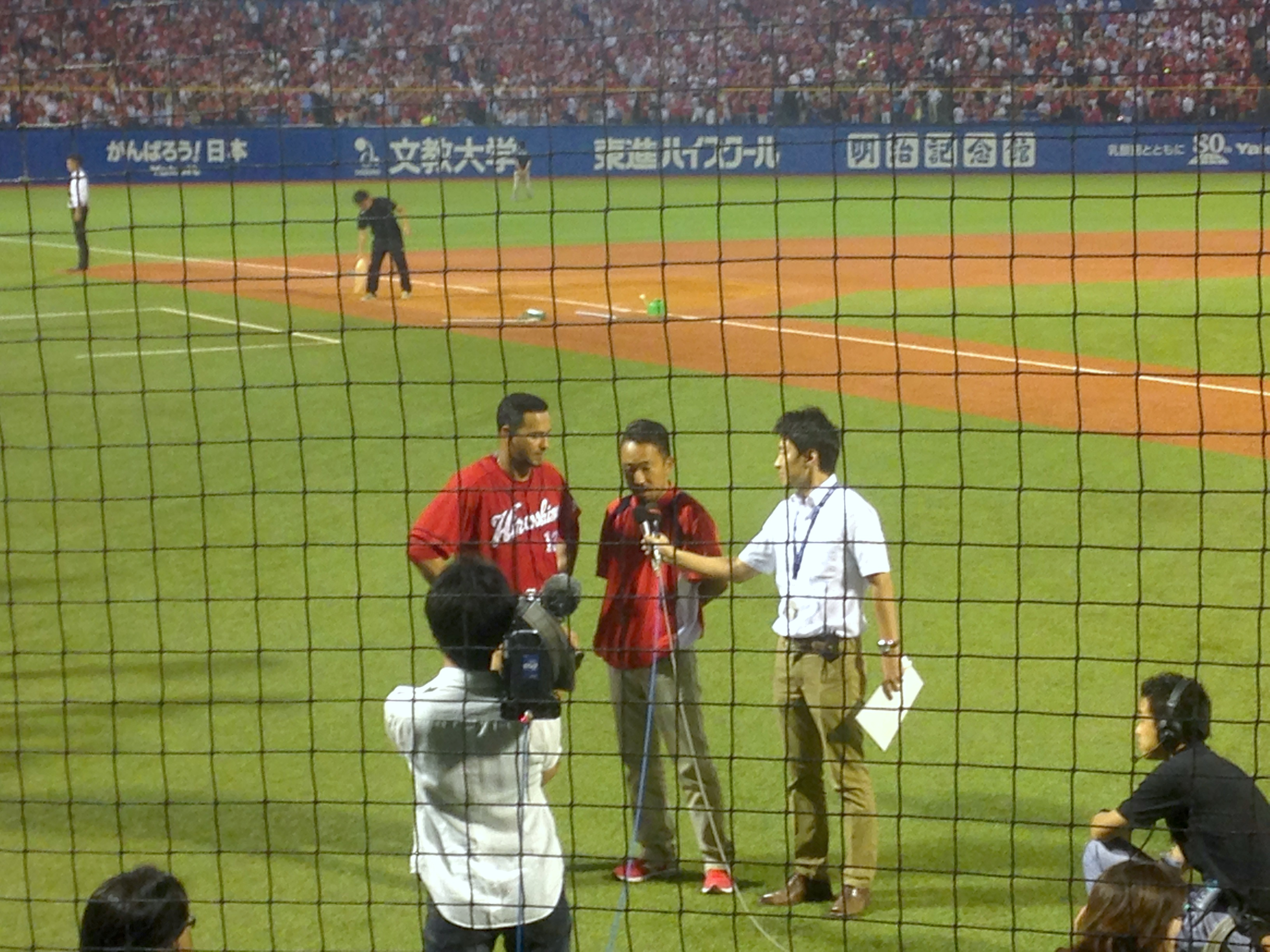
Guzmán (far left) being interviewed after a winning game, July 2015

On October 26, 2014, it was announced that he had signed a one-year, $1 million contract with the Hiroshima Toyo Carp of Nippon Professional Baseball.

=== Toros de Tijuana ===
On January 1, 2016, Guzmán signed a minor league contract with the Chicago Cubs organization. He was released by the Cubs prior to the start of the season on March 30.

On April 18, 2016, Guzmán signed with the Toros de Tijuana of the Mexican League to be a pitcher. However, he did not pitch for the team, slashing .232/.384/.377 with one home run and 13 RBI over 20 appearances. Guzmán was released by Tijuana on May 29.

=== Delfines de La Guaira ===
In 2025, Guzmán signed with the Delfines de La Guaira of the Venezuelan Major League.

== Personal life ==
Guzmán has a wife, Yolimar, and a daughter, Brianna Barbara.

== See also ==
- List of Major League Baseball players from Venezuela
