= Jed =

Jed or JED may refer to:

== Places ==
- Jed River, New Zealand
- Jed Water, a river in Scotland, UK
- Jed, West Virginia, United States, an unincorporated community
- King Abdulaziz International Airport (IATA airport code JED), Jeddah, Saudi Arabia

== People and fictional characters ==
- Jed (given name), a list of people and fictional characters with the given name or nickname
- Jed the Fish (born 1955), radio disc jockey Edwin Fish Gould III
- Jed Madela, stage name of Filipino recording artist and TV host John Edward Tajanlangit (born 1977)

== Military ==
- HMS Jed, several Royal Navy ships
- Jed, slang for a member of the World War II Allied secret Operation Jedburgh
- Journal of Electronic Defense, a military science periodical on electronic warfare

== Other uses ==
- The JEDS, the backing band for Sarah McTernan
- Jed (album), by the Goo Goo Dolls
- The Jed Foundation, a non-profit organization promoting emotional health and prevent suicide among college students
- Jed (wolfdog), an animal actor
- JED (text editor)
- Julian Ephemeris Date, i.e. Julian date

== See also ==
- Jeb (disambiguation)
