= Yonder Alonso =

Cuban baseball player and analyst (born 1987)

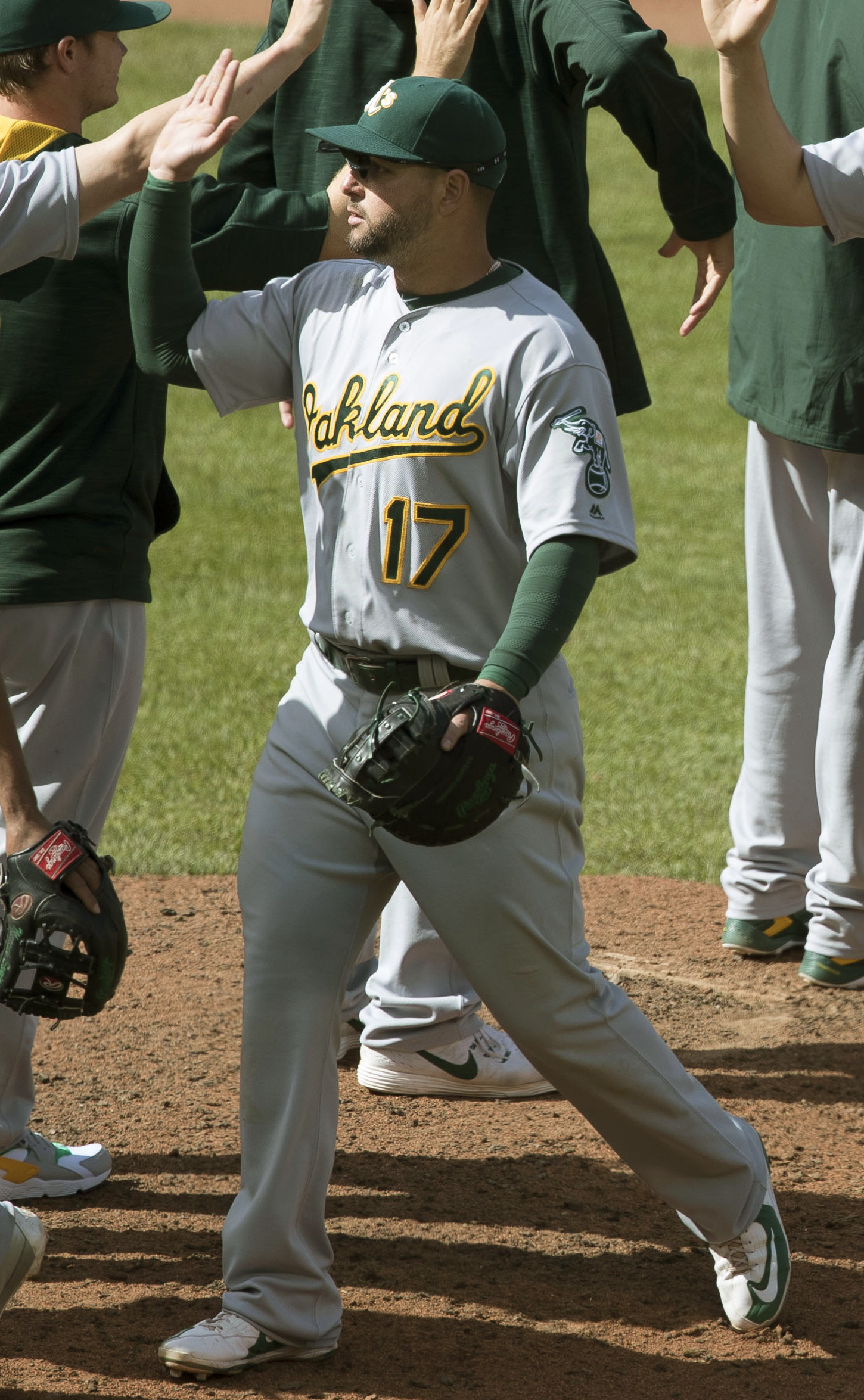
- Alonso with the Oakland Athletics in 2016
- First baseman
- Born: April 8, 1987 (age 39); Havana, Cuba
- Batted: Left Threw: Right

MLB debut
- September 1, 2010, for the Cincinnati Reds

Last MLB appearance
- September 29, 2019, for the Colorado Rockies

MLB statistics
- Batting average: .259
- Home runs: 100
- Runs batted in: 426
- Stats at Baseball Reference

Teams
- Cincinnati Reds (2010–2011); San Diego Padres (2012–2015); Oakland Athletics (2016–2017); Seattle Mariners (2017); Cleveland Indians (2018); Chicago White Sox (2019); Colorado Rockies (2019)

Career highlights and awards
- All-Star (2017)

Yonder Alonso (born April 8, 1987) is a Cuban former professional baseball first baseman and current MLB Network analyst. He played in Major League Baseball (MLB) for the Cincinnati Reds, San Diego Padres, Oakland Athletics, Seattle Mariners, Cleveland Indians, Chicago White Sox and Colorado Rockies. Prior to entering the major leagues, he played college baseball at the University of Miami.

== Early life ==
Yonder Alonso was born in Havana, Cuba, on April 8, 1987, to parents Luis and Damarys. His father played and coached for Industriales of the Cuban National Series, and taught Alonso to play as well. The family defected from Cuba in 1996 and settled in Miami, where Alonso played on a Little League team funded by Jose Canseco. Alonso attended Coral Gables Senior High School in Coral Gables, Florida, and was selected by the Minnesota Twins in the 16th round of the 2005 Major League Baseball draft. He did not sign, choosing instead to attend college at the University of Miami.

== College career ==
Alonso attended the University of Miami, where he played three seasons for the Hurricanes. He led the team to the College World Series as a freshman, with a team-leading 69 RBIs. His sister attended the same school and was a member of the cheerleading squad.

His sophomore year he batted .376, led the Atlantic Coast Conference with 18 home runs, knocked in 74 runs, and scored 57 times. He also ranked second in the ACC with a .519 on-base percentage and .705 slugging percentage. Alonso played in the Valley Baseball League, located in the Shenandoah Valley of Virginia in 2007. In 2007 and 2008, he played collegiate summer baseball for the Brewster Whitecaps of the Cape Cod Baseball League and was named a league all-star in 2007.

In 2008, he hit .373 with 15 home runs, 51 RBIs, and eight stolen bases.

Alonso was inducted into the University of Miami Sports Hall of Fame at its 50th annual induction in April 2018.

== Professional career ==
=== Cincinnati Reds ===
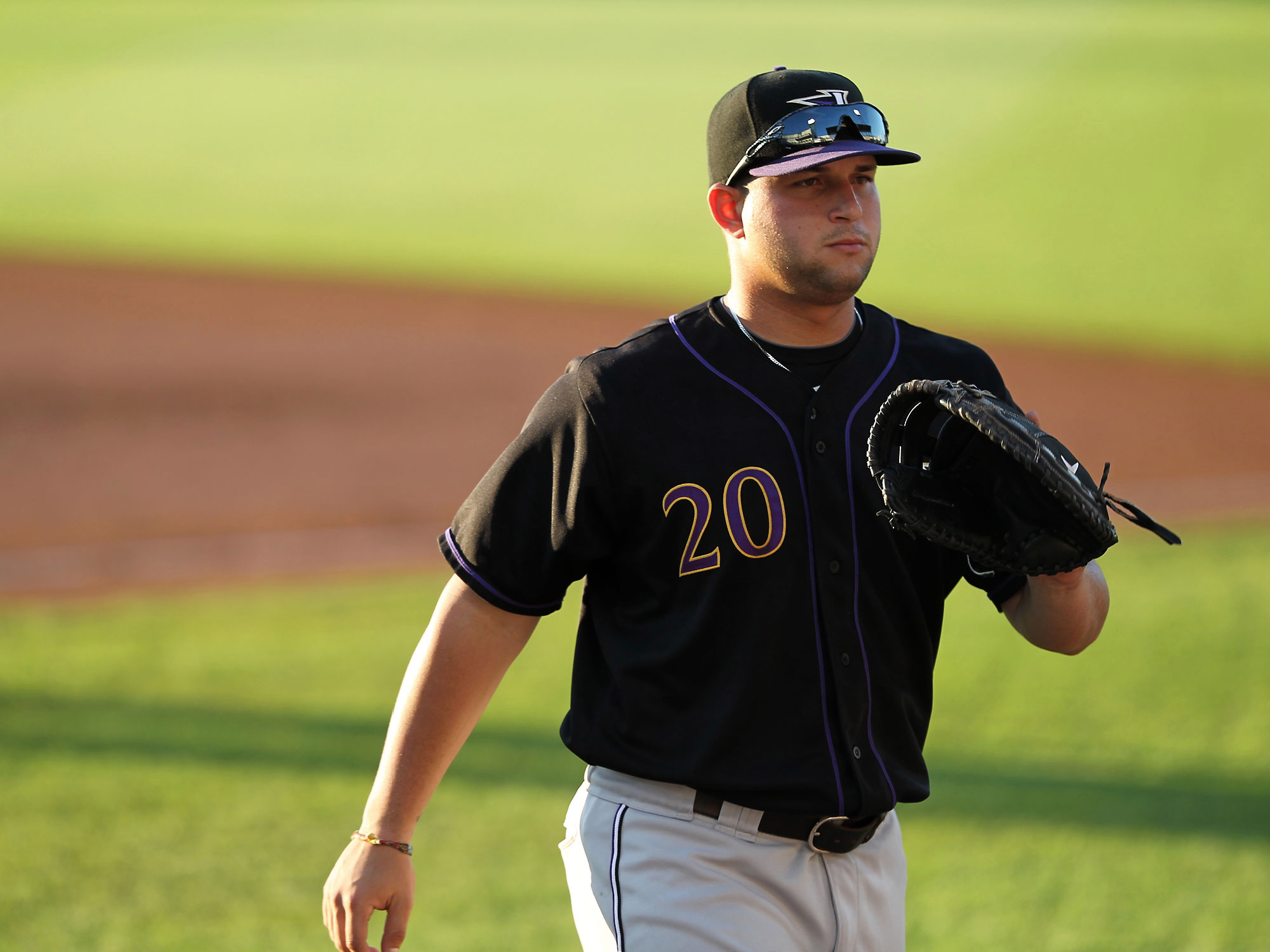
Alonso playing for the Louisville Bats in 2010

In 2008, Alonso was drafted for the second time with the seventh overall pick by the Cincinnati Reds. He signed with the Reds for $4.55 million.

Alonso made his Minor League debut on August 26, 2008, for the High–A Sarasota Reds against the Clearwater Threshers. He went 1–for–3 with a double and a walk. In just six games for Sarasota, he went 6–for–19 with two RBI.

After the 2008 season, Alonso joined the Waikiki BeachBoys of the Hawaii Winter Baseball league and hit .308 with four home runs and 21 RBI in 29 games. He had 32 total hits in 104 at–bats.

Alonso entered the 2009 season ranked as the number one overall prospect in the Reds organization by Baseball America. He started the season with Sarasota, played 49 games, and hit .303 in 175 at–bats with seven home runs, 13 doubles, and 38 RBI. After receiving a promotion to the Double–A Carolina Mudcats, he hit .295 in 105 at–bats, with 11 doubles, two home runs, and 14 RBI over 29 games. He also played for the Peoria Saguaros of the Arizona Fall League in 2009, .267 in 23 games.

Alonso started 2010 in Carolina playing left field, as he was blocked at first base in Cincinnati by Joey Votto. In May, Alonso was promoted to the Triple–A Louisville Bats where he played 82 of his 101 games at first base, hitting .296 with 12 home runs. Alonso was called up by the Reds on September 1 after the rosters expanded. He made his major league debut that day, pinch hitting for Brandon Phillips. On September 4, in his second at bat as a pinch hitter, Alonso doubled off St. Louis Cardinals pitcher Mike MacDougal for his first major league hit, and scored his first major league run that inning.

Alonso began the 2011 season at Triple–A, playing the majority of his games in left field and batting .296. On July 26, 2011, Alonso was recalled to the Reds after they traded Jonny Gomes. He served mostly as a pinch hitter, picking up 98 plate appearances over 47 games and batting .330 with a .943 OPS. Alonso made 14 starts in left field and one each at first and third base. Alonso was projected as a left fielder for the Reds in 2012, although he struggled defensively at the position during 2011.

=== San Diego Padres ===
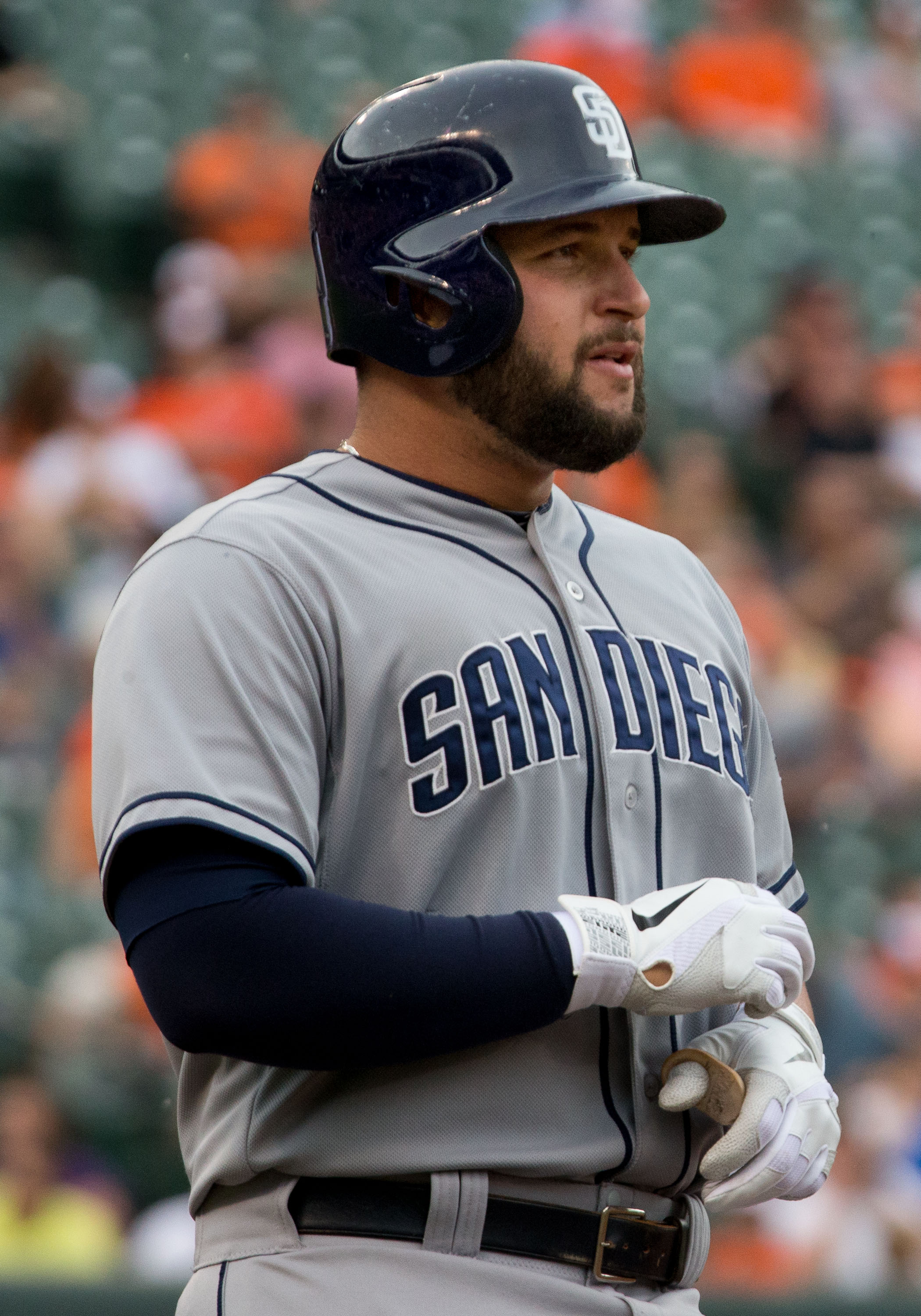
Alonso with the San Diego Padres in 2013

Alonso, Edinson Vólquez, Yasmani Grandal, and Brad Boxberger were traded to the San Diego Padres in exchange for Mat Latos on December 17, 2011. He was projected to start at first base ahead of Anthony Rizzo, who was eventually traded. Alonso came into 2012 still classified as a rookie with only 117 career at–bats.

Alonso played 155 games for the Padres in 2012, including 144 starts at first base, and posted a batting line of .273/.348/.393 with nine home runs. He set a Padres franchise record with 39 doubles as a rookie, breaking the old rookie mark of 33 by Benito Santiago in 1987. Alonso also had 10 multi–double games, the most in the major leagues since 2006. Alonso committed 12 errors at first base, tying for the league lead. He finished 6th in the NL Rookie of the Year voting.

Alonso was the starting first baseman to begin 2013. On April 10, Alonso started at first base against the Dodgers. In the 9th inning, with second baseman Alexi Amarista having been pinch–hit for the previous inning, Alonso moved to second base for the first time in his professional career. With left–handed hitter Andre Ethier up after Adrián González hit a ground ball to second that Alonso couldn't come up with, Alonso and third baseman Jedd Gyorko switched positions. After Ethier was hit and two right-handed hitters were due, Alonso and Gyorko switched again, and the Padres got out of the inning after A.J. Ellis grounded out to third. On June 6, Alonso was placed on the 15–day disabled list after he got hit on the hand by a pitch from Aaron Loup on May 31. Kyle Blanks and Jesús Guzmán then entered a platoon while Alonso was out. At the time, he was hitting .284 with six home runs and 29 RBI. He was activated on July 12. On August 30, Alonso suffered a separate injury to his right hand, which caused him to miss most of September. Blanks and Guzmán filled in initially, but when Tommy Medica was called up, he started the rest of the season at first. Alonso returned to action on September 28, and appeared in two games as a pinch–runner. In 97 games in 2013, he hit .281/.341/.368 with six home runs and 45 RBI.

On June 19, 2014, Alonso was placed on the 15-day disabled list with right hand tendinitis. On July 26, after missing 30 games, Alonso was activated off the disabled list. After playing almost a month, Alonso was ruled out for the season on August 17 because of a forearm strain. In 84 games in 2014, Alonso hit .240/.285/.397 with 7 home runs and 27 RBI.

In 2015, Alonso would spend time on the 15–day disabled list but would be activated on June 2. In 2015, Alonso hit .282 with five home runs and 31 RBI over 103 games; he had two separate stints on the disabled list because of a shoulder injury and strained lower back.

=== Oakland Athletics ===
On December 2, 2015, the Padres traded Alonso and Marc Rzepczynski to the Oakland Athletics in exchange for Drew Pomeranz, José Torres, and a player to be named later or cash considerations (later specified as Jabari Blash). On January 13, 2016, the A's and Alonso announced that they had agreed to a one-year contract worth $2.65 million to avoid arbitration. In 2016, Alonso batted .253/.316/.367 with seven home runs and 56 RBI. Alonso avoided salary arbitration with the Athletics for a second consecutive season, by agreeing to a $4 million contract for the 2017 season on December 3, 2016.

During the first half of the 2017 season, Alonso hit a career–high 20 home runs. He was named to the 2017 MLB All-Star Game. In 100 total games, he hit .267/.369/.527 with 22 home runs and 49 RBI.

=== Seattle Mariners ===
On August 6, 2017, the Athletics traded Alonso to the Seattle Mariners in exchange for Boog Powell. In 42 games for Seattle, Alonso slashed .265/.353/.439 with six home runs and 18 RBI.

=== Cleveland Indians ===
On December 20, 2017, Alonso signed a two–year contract with the Cleveland Indians worth $16 million. The deal became official on December 23. In his first season in Cleveland, Alonso continued his power surge from the previous season, hitting 23 home runs with a career–high 83 RBI in 145 games. He had the lowest fielding percentage among major league first basemen, at .990.

=== Chicago White Sox ===
On December 15, 2018, Cleveland traded Alonso to the Chicago White Sox in exchange for minor league outfielder Alex Call. On June 28, 2019, Alonso was designated for assignment after he hit .178 with seven home runs and 27 RBI in 67 games. He was placed on release waivers on July 3.

=== Colorado Rockies ===
On July 11, 2019, Alonso signed a minor league contract with the Colorado Rockies. On July 23, the Rockies selected Alonso's contract. Alonso was mainly used as a pinch hitter for the Rockies, hitting .260 with three home runs and 10 RBI in 73 at–bats.

On February 14, 2020, Alonso signed a minor league contract with the Atlanta Braves. He was later outrighted off of the roster before the season began on July 23. On August 11, Alonso was traded to the San Diego Padres in exchange for cash considerations. He did not play in a game in 2020 due to the cancellation of the minor league season because of the COVID-19 pandemic. Alonso became a free agent on November 2.

Alonso announced his retirement via Instagram on November 20, 2020.

== Post-baseball career ==
On April 27, 2021, Alonso joined MLB Network as an on-air analyst.

== Personal life ==
Alonso married Sarah Ostreicher in February 2025.

Alonso's sister, Yainee, is married to Manny Machado.
