= Kyle Phillips (baseball) =

American baseball player (born 1984)

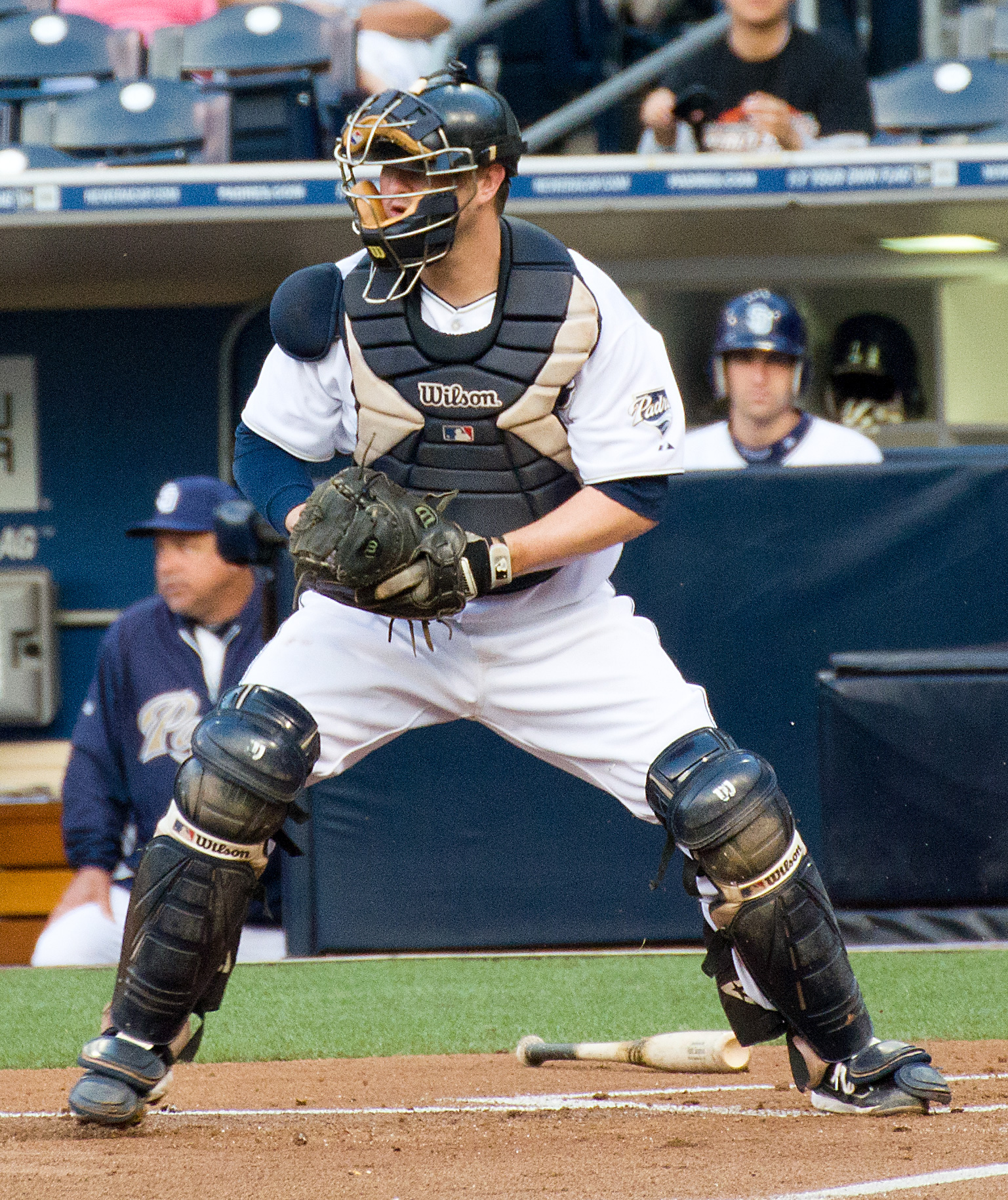
- Phillips with the San Diego Padres
- Catcher
- Born: April 3, 1984 (age 41); San Diego, California, U.S.
- Batted: Left Threw: Right

MLB debut
- September 14, 2009, for the Toronto Blue Jays

Last MLB appearance
- July 24, 2011, for the San Diego Padres

MLB statistics
- Batting average: .191
- Home runs: 2
- Runs batted in: 12
- Stats at Baseball Reference

Teams
- Toronto Blue Jays (2009); San Diego Padres (2011)

Kyle Raymond Phillips (born April 3, 1984) is an American former professional baseball catcher. Phillips was drafted by the Minnesota Twins in the 2002 MLB draft in the 10th round and is the younger brother of former major leaguer Jason Phillips.

== Playing career ==
=== Minor leagues ===
After spending four seasons in the Twins' organization, he was signed by the Milwaukee Brewers in April 2006 and released on March 24, 2007. On March 30, 2007 Phillips signed with the Blue Jays as a Minor League free agent.

=== Minnesota Twins ===
In four seasons with the Twins organization, Phillips hit .239 with 24 home runs and 145 RBIs.

=== Milwaukee Brewers ===
In one season with the Brewers' Brevard County Manatees farm team, he hit three home runs, drove in 35 runs and hit .236.

=== Toronto Blue Jays ===
Phillips spent the 2007 season with the Dunedin Blue Jays and the 2008 season with New Hampshire Fisher Cats. With Dunedin, Phillips hit .306 with 10 home runs and 62 RBIs. With New Hampshire he hit .306 with 8 home runs and 34 RBIs.

He started the 2009 season in New Hampshire hitting .175 with one home run and one RBI. Phillips was then promoted to Las Vegas, hitting .300 with 8 home runs and 29 RBIs.

He made his major league debut on September 14, 2009 getting a hit in 4 at-bats.

=== San Diego Padres ===
On June 25, 2010, Phillips was traded to the San Diego Padres for a player to be named later. He hit his first major league home run in a day game against the Atlanta Braves on May 30, 2011. He was designated for assignment by the Padres on August 31, 2011. He elected free agency on October 11.

=== Return to Toronto ===
On January 27, 2012, Phillips signed a minor league contract with the Toronto Blue Jays which was later voided due to injury.

== Scouting ==
Phillips was hired on as an advanced scout by former GM with San Diego Jed Hoyer with the Chicago Cubs for the 2012 season.
