= Nick Hundley =

American baseball player (born 1983)

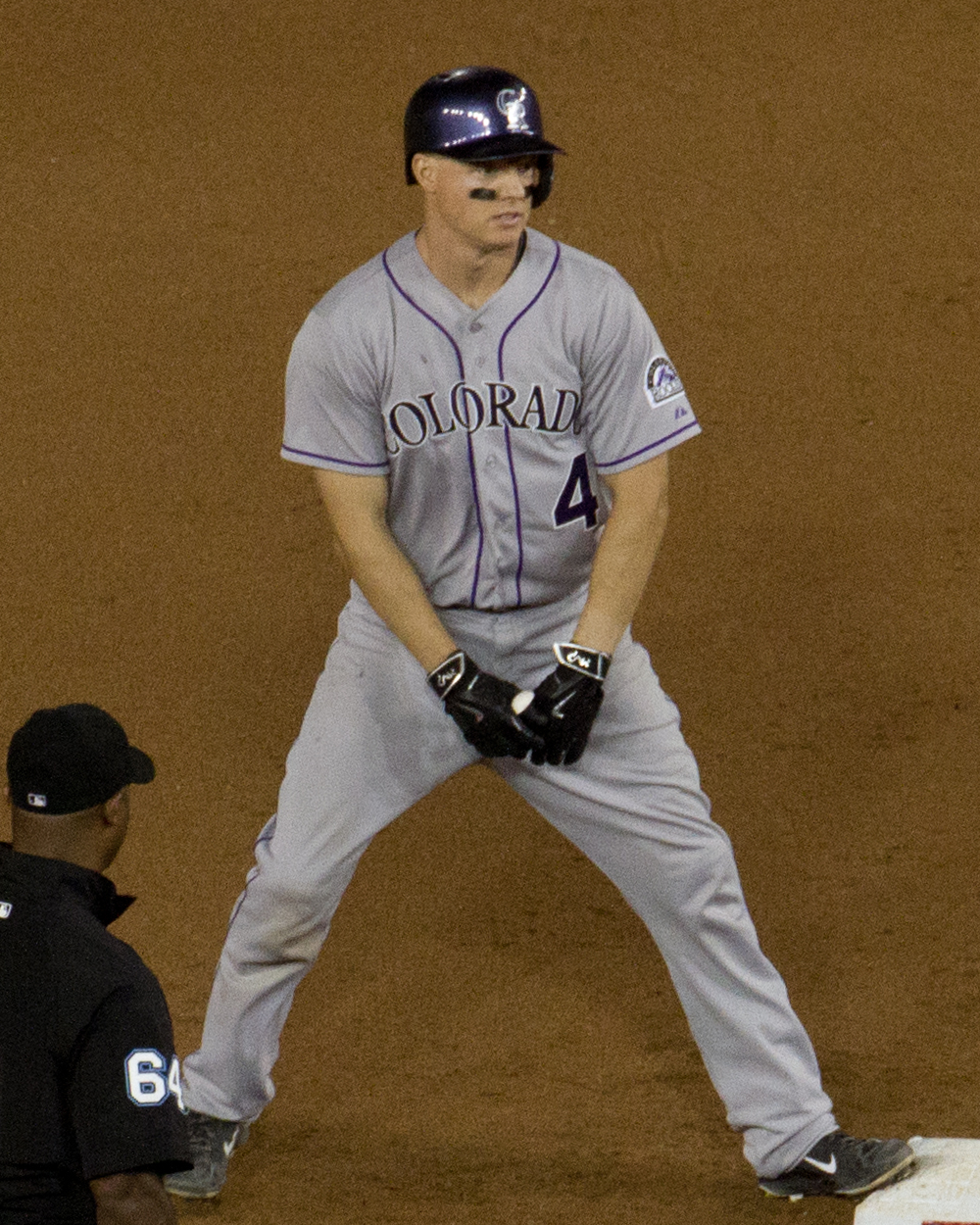
- Hundley playing for the Colorado Rockies in 2015
- Catcher
- Born: September 8, 1983 (age 43); Corvallis, Oregon, U.S.
- Batted: Right Threw: Right

MLB debut
- July 4, 2008, for the San Diego Padres

Last MLB appearance
- June 8, 2019, for the Oakland Athletics

MLB statistics
- Batting average: .247
- Home runs: 93
- Runs batted in: 376
- Stats at Baseball Reference

Teams
- San Diego Padres (2008–2014); Baltimore Orioles (2014); Colorado Rockies (2015–2016); San Francisco Giants (2017–2018); Oakland Athletics (2019)

Nicholas John Hundley (born September 8, 1983) is an American former professional baseball catcher and current front office executive. He played in Major League Baseball (MLB) for the San Diego Padres, Baltimore Orioles, Colorado Rockies, San Francisco Giants, and Oakland Athletics. He was drafted in 2005 by the Padres in the second round, and made his major-league debut in 2008.

== Early life ==
Hundley was born in Corvallis, Oregon, to Pam and Tim Hundley. He grew up with his brother Jake, and they would play catch with their father when he came home from his job as an American football assistant coach with Oregon State. When their father was late, Hundley would pressure his mom to fill in.

Hundley attended Eastside Catholic High School in Bellevue briefly and played baseball for Lake Washington High School. He was drafted in the fifth round of the 2002 Major League Baseball draft by the Florida Marlins, but opted to attend college.

== College career ==
Hundley played three seasons with the University of Arizona Wildcats, and was named by Baseball America to the second All-America team in 2005. In 2003, he played collegiate summer baseball in the Cape Cod Baseball League for the Yarmouth-Dennis Red Sox.

== Professional career ==
Hundley was drafted in 2005 by the San Diego Padres in the second round.

=== Minor leagues ===
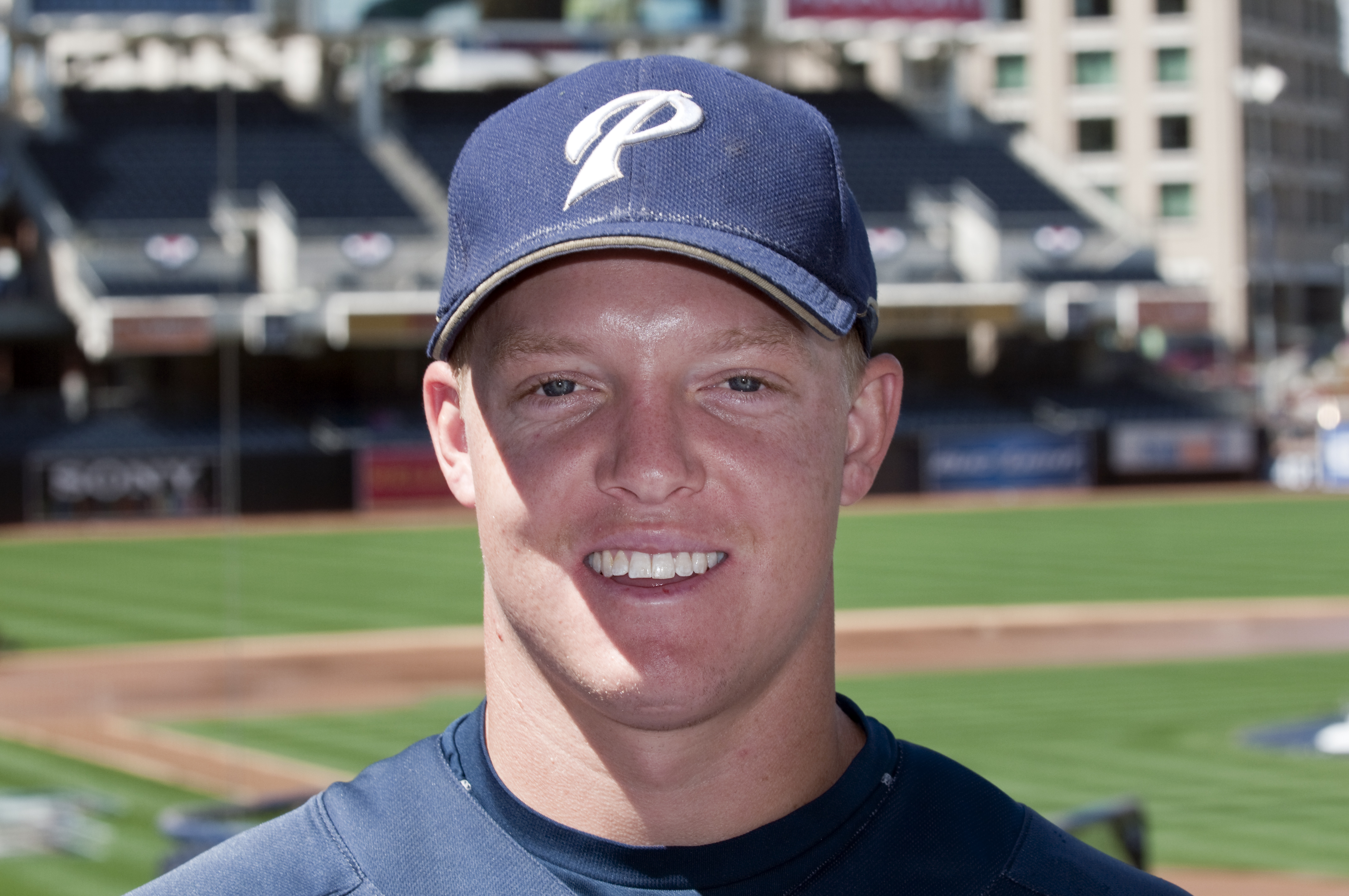
Hundley in 2009.

Hundley began 2006 with the Class-A Fort Wayne Wizards, and was promoted in July to the High-A Lake Elsinore Storm. He was Player of the Week June 18, 2006. He played all of 2007 with the Double-A San Antonio Missions, batting .247/.324/.475 with 20 home runs (tied with Chase Headley for 4th in the Texas League) and 72 RBIs (tied with Colby Rasmus for 9th). He was named a Texas League post-season All Star.

He began 2008 with the Triple-A Portland Beavers where he batted .189 through May, but raised his average to .232 before his call-up on July 3. He also threw out 38% of base stealers in his 57 games.

=== San Diego Padres ===
==== 2008 ====
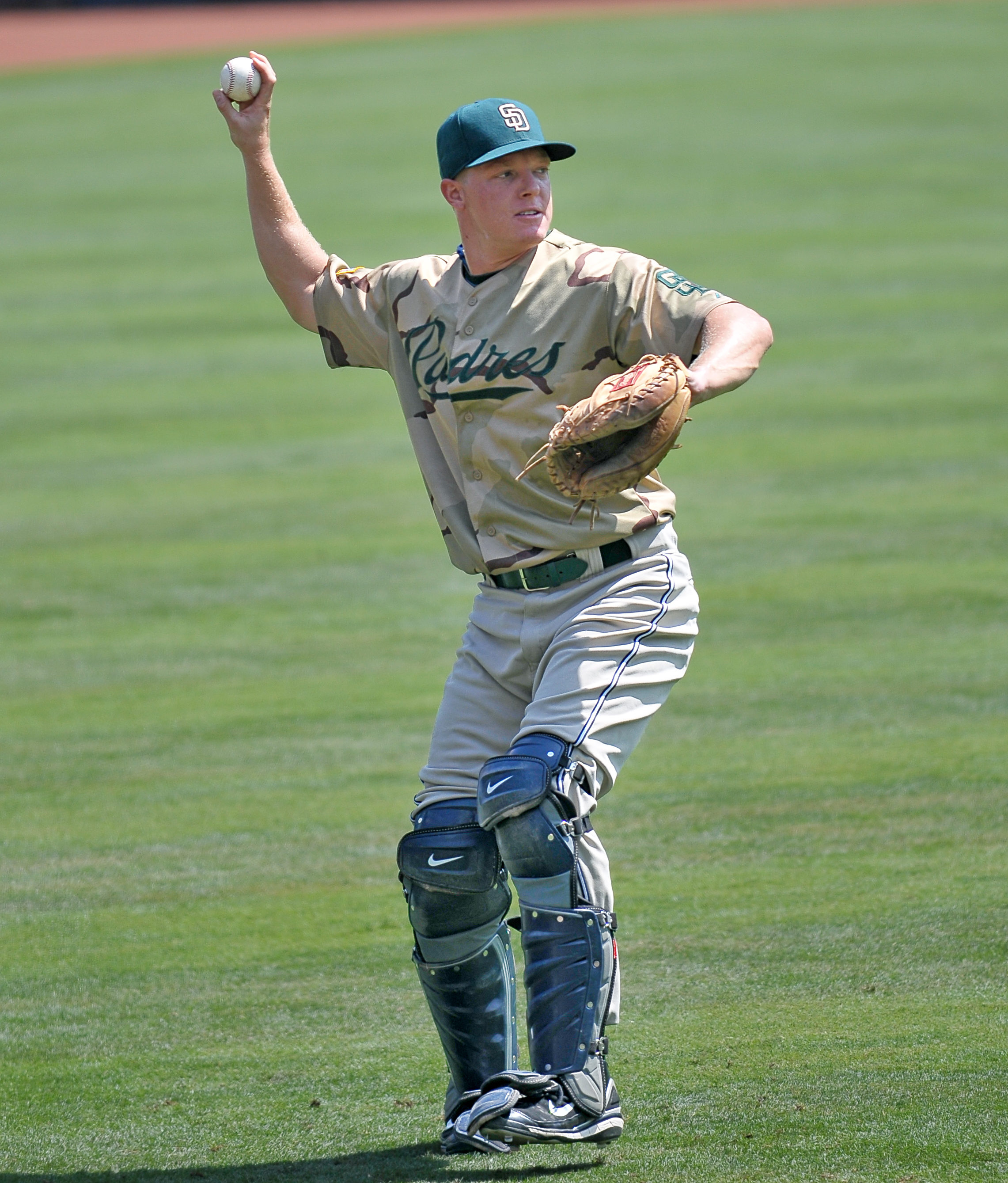
Hundley with the San Diego Padres in 2008

Hundley was called up to the majors for the first time on July 3, 2008, when Michael Barrett suffered a season-ending injury. Hundley moved into the role of primary catcher, backed up by Josh Bard and Luke Carlin. On July 26, he hit his first career home run against the Pittsburgh Pirates. He batted .237 for the season.

==== 2009 ====
Based on his performance in 60 games in 2008, Hundley went to spring training in 2009 as the Padres starting catcher. During the season, he was mentored by back-up Henry Blanco, but he missed approximately 50 games from late June to early August due to a wrist injury. He batted .238 for the season.

==== 2010 ====
In 2010, Hundley shared catching duties with Yorvit Torrealba, appearing in 85 games and batting .249/.308/.418 with eight home runs and 43 RBIs in 273 at bats.

==== 2011 ====
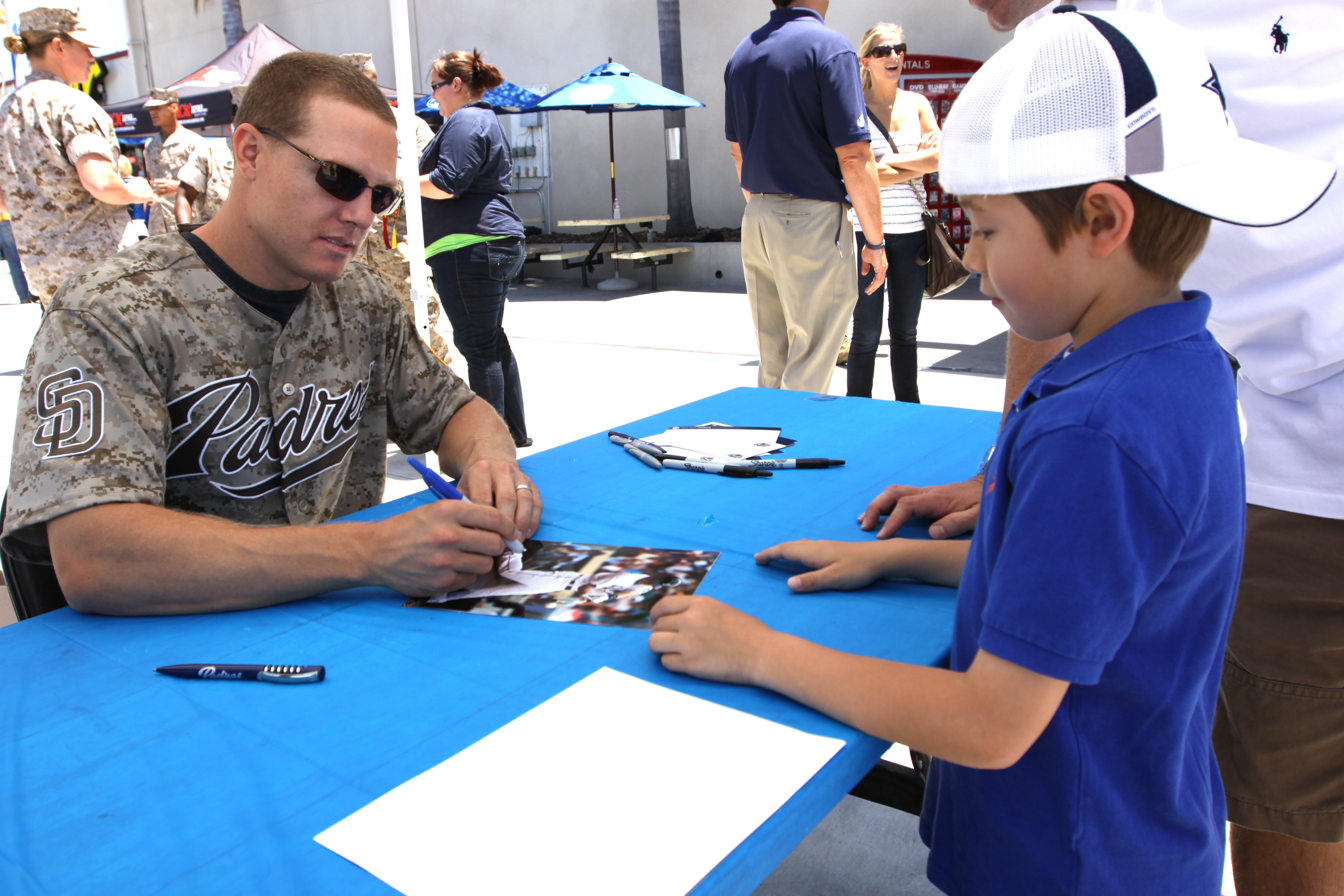
Hundley signing autograph at US Marine base in 2011

In 2011, Hundley was the Padres’ primary catcher, but he lost significant playing time to an oblique injury and elbow surgery. Against the Florida Marlins on August 21, he hit his fifth triple of the season, tying the Padres’ single-season record for triples by a catcher set by Benito Santiago in 1990. It was also Hundley's fourth triple in six games. He was named NL Player of the Week August 22. Hundley finished the season with a .288/.347/.477 batting line and 9 home runs in 281 at bats, career highs in all categories at the time. Behind the plate, he threw out 36% of runners trying to steal.

==== 2012 ====
On March 20, 2012, Hundley signed a long-term contract with the Padres that would keep him in San Diego through 2014 with a club option for 2015, which was the first year Hundley would be eligible for free agency. After a prolonged slump at the start of the 2012 season, Hundley was optioned to Triple-A Tucson on June 30, and catcher Yasmani Grandal was recalled. At the time, Hundley was hitting only .166 with three home runs, 22 RBIs, and 50 strikeouts in 55 games with San Diego. Hundley batted .190 in 13 games in Triple-A and spent time on the disabled list with a strained hamstring before returning to the Padres on August 9. He played in only three more games before a torn meniscus in his right knee forced him to the disabled list and eventually required surgery, ending his season. Hundley said that he had injured the knee in a game in April when he was trying to recover a pitch in the dirt and got tangled with the umpire. Manager Bud Black believed the injury contributed to Hundley's poor season at the plate. He ended the season batting .157/.219/.245 with three home runs and 22 RBIs in 204 at bats.

==== 2013 ====
Hundley opened 2013 as the Padres’ primary catcher as Grandal was serving a 50-game suspension for using performance-enhancing drugs. Hundley stirred up some controversy in May when he made remarks about Grandal's steroid use in an interview, but the two reportedly settled the issue. Hundley and Grandal briefly shared catching duties until Grandal suffered a season-ending injury on July 6. Hundley returned to the primary catching role and finished the season with a career-high 102 starts behind the plate. He also set career highs in at bats (373), hits (87), doubles (19), and home runs (13). He put up a .233/.290/.389 batting line with 44 RBIs, and threw out 26% of base stealers.

==== 2014 ====
Hundley began 2014 losing playing time to Grandal and René Rivera, and he became expendable as the team developed a need for pitching after multiple injuries to its pitching staff. Before he was traded, in 59 at bats he hit .271/.271/.373 with one home run and three RBIs.

=== Baltimore Orioles ===
==== 2014 ====
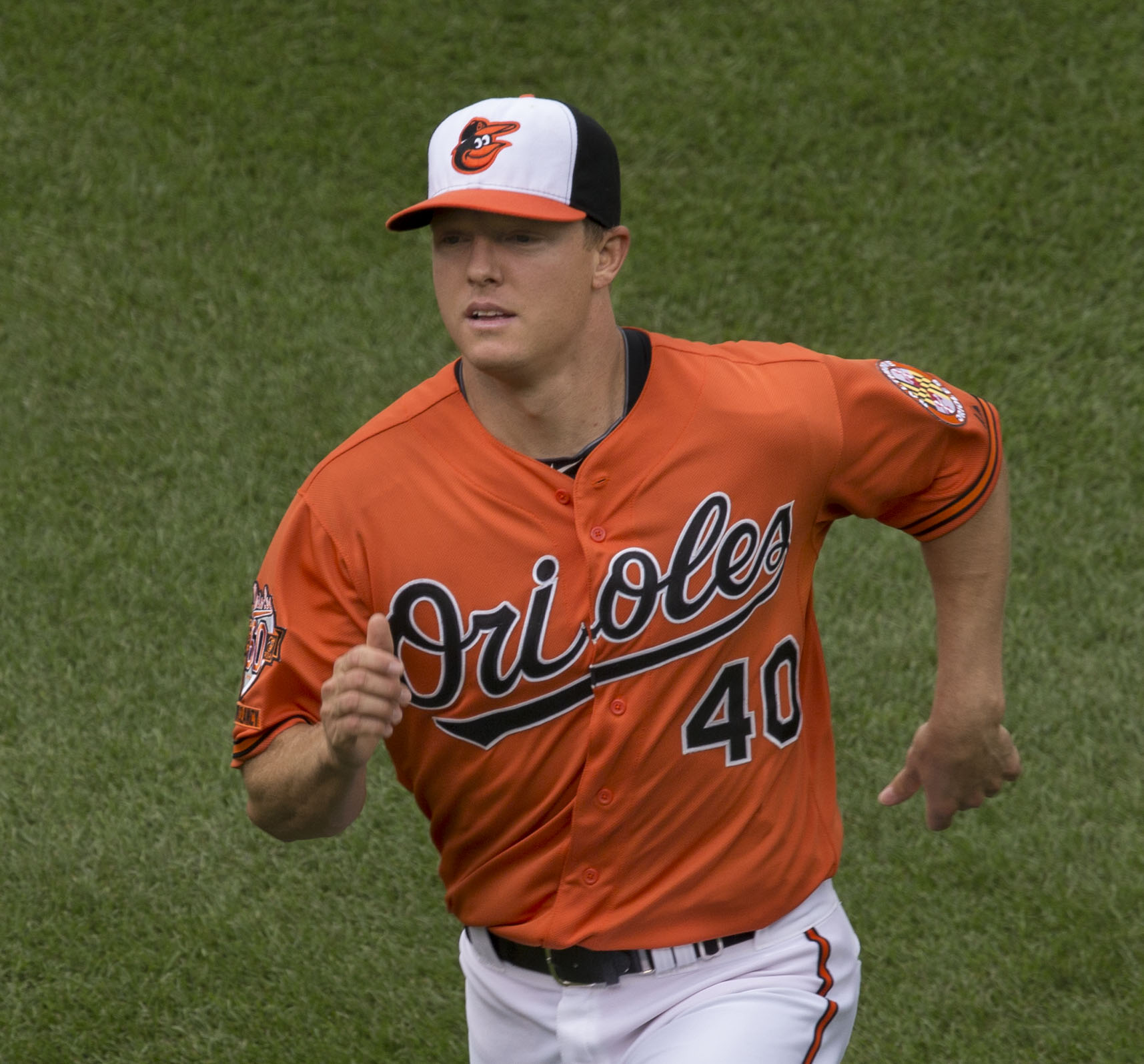
Hundley during his tenure with the Baltimore Orioles in 2014

On May 24, 2014, the Padres traded Hundley and cash to the Baltimore Orioles in exchange for Troy Patton. On August 19, Hundley hit his 50th career home run, off of Chicago White Sox pitcher Daniel Webb in the 7th inning of a 5-1 victory for the Orioles. For the season, in 159 at bats with the Orioles he hit .233/.273/.352 with five home runs and 19 RBIs. He threw out 19 percent of attempted basestealers.

=== Colorado Rockies ===
==== 2015 ====
On January 5, 2015, Hundley signed a two-year, $6 million contract with the Colorado Rockies.

Hundley batted a career-high .301 in 103 games in 366 at bats for the Rockies in his first season. He scored a career-high 45 runs, hit 10 home runs, drove in 43 runs, and tied a previous career high by stealing five bases. He threw out 34 percent of attempted basestealers.

==== 2016 ====
Hundley appeared in 83 games for the Rockies in 2016, and in 289 at-bats hit .260/.320/.439 with 10 home runs and 48 RBIs (a career high). He threw out 14 percent of attempted basestealers.

=== San Francisco Giants ===
On January 24, 2017, Hundley signed a one-year, $2 million contract with the San Francisco Giants. On September 29, he received the 2017 Willie Mac Award. In 287 at bats with the Giants in 2017 he batted .244/.272/.418 with 9 home runs and 35 RBIs. He threw out 29 percent of attempted basestealers.

On December 19, 2017, Hundley signed a one-year contract with the Giants.

On August 14, Hundley got into an altercation with Yasiel Puig at home plate. After fouling off a pitch, a frustrated Puig threw his bat up and snatched it out of the air, feeling like he had a good pitch to hit. Hundley took exception and the two had words. Puig shoved Hundley, causing a bench-clearing brawl. Both were ejected.

In 282 at-bats with the Giants in 2018, he batted .241/.298/.408 with 10 home runs and 31 RBIs. He threw out 21 percent of attempted basestealers.

=== Oakland Athletics ===
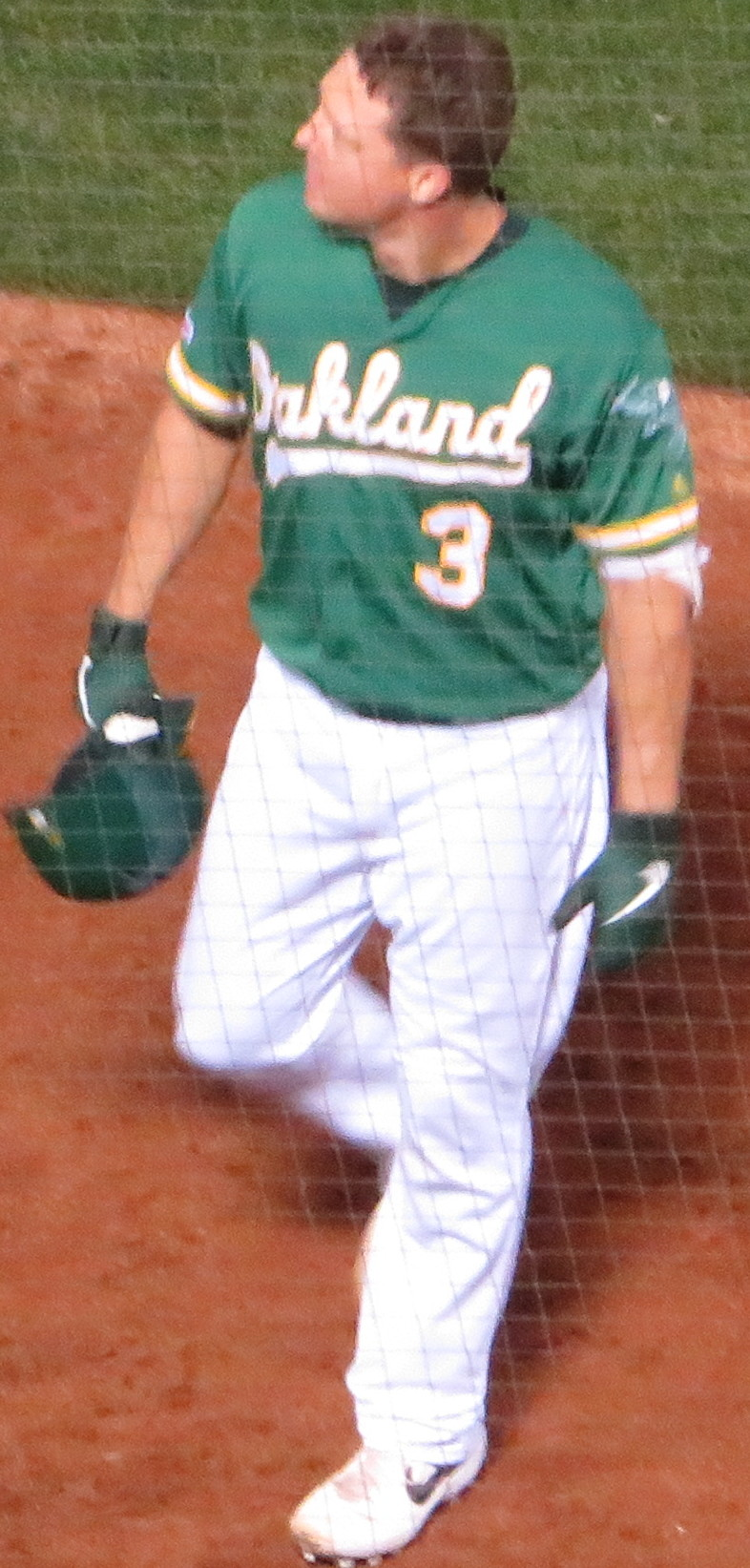
Hundley with the Oakland Athletics in 2019

On February 11, 2019, Hundley signed a minor-league contract with the Oakland Athletics that included an invitation to spring training. On March 19, Hundley's contract was purchased by the Athletics and he was added to their active roster before their season opener in Japan. Hundley was designated for assignment on July 25, 2019, after being activated from the injured list. He was released on July 27. In 70 at-bats with Oakland in 2019, he batted .200/.233/.357 with two home runs and five RBIs. He threw out 22 percent of attempted basestealers.

=== Philadelphia Phillies ===
On August 13, 2019, Hundley signed a minor-league deal with the Philadelphia Phillies. He was released on August 30, 2019.

== Post-playing career ==
On February 6, 2020, Hundley retired to take on a new post in the baseball operations department for MLB.

On February 7, 2022, Hundley was hired by the Texas Rangers as a special assistant to the general manager, Chris Young.

== Personal life ==
Hundley's father, Tim, is an assistant football coach and is currently the safeties coach for the UNLV Rebels football team in Las Vegas, Nevada.

Hundley's wife Amy gave birth to their first child, a daughter, on August 15, 2013.
