= James Darnell =

American baseball player (born 1987)

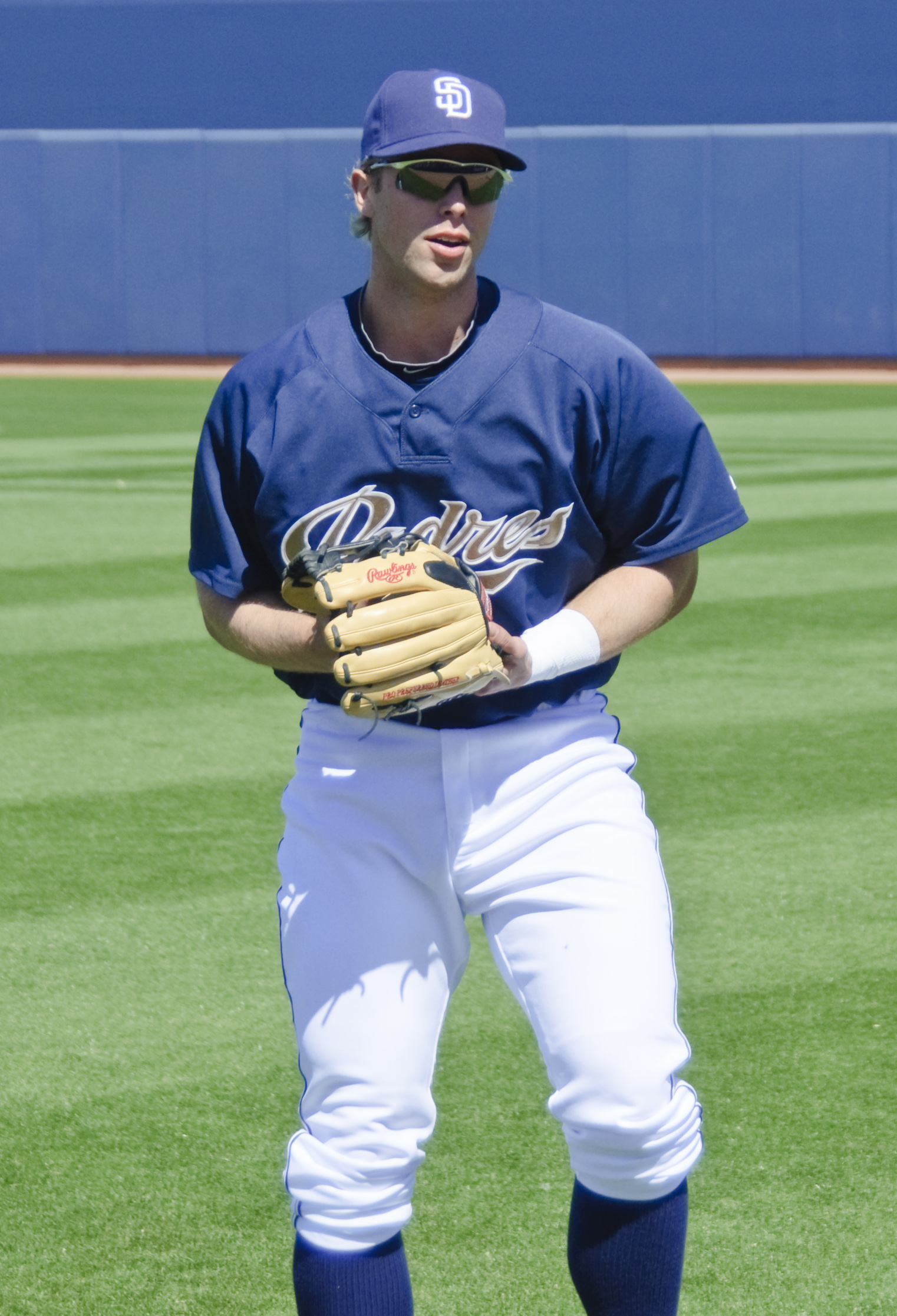
- Darnell with the San Diego Padres
- Third baseman
- Born: January 19, 1987 (age 38); Fresno, California, U.S.
- Batted: Right Threw: Right

MLB debut
- August 9, 2011, for the San Diego Padres

Last MLB appearance
- May 17, 2012, for the San Diego Padres

MLB statistics
- Batting average: .226
- Home runs: 2
- Runs batted in: 8
- Stats at Baseball Reference

Teams
- San Diego Padres (2011–2012)

James Thomas Darnell (born January 19, 1987) is an American former professional baseball third baseman. He played in Major League Baseball (MLB) for the San Diego Padres. He was drafted in the second round of the 2008 MLB draft by the Padres.

== High school ==
Darnell attended Upland High School, Arrowhead Christian Academy and San Ramon Valley High School. He was a four-year varsity starter and a four-year All-League high school selection. He compiled a career batting average of .475 with 20 home runs and 50 stolen bases.

== College ==
In 2007, Darnell led the South Carolina Gamecocks Baseball team with a .331 average. He collected 19 home runs and 63 RBIs. James earned second team All-Southeastern Conference honors at third base. In 2006 and 2007, Darnell played collegiate summer baseball for the Hyannis Mets of the Cape Cod Baseball League. In 2007, he was a Cape Cod Baseball League All-Star. In 2008, James hit .306 with 19 homers and 81 RBIs and again selected to All-Southeastern Conference honors at third base. At the University of South Carolina Darnell was accepted into number one international business school at the Darla Moore School of Business. He was also an SEC Academic Honor Roll Member.

== Professional career ==
=== San Diego Padres ===
Darnell was drafted by the San Diego Padres in the 2nd round (69th overall) of the 2008 Major League Baseball draft. He was rated by Baseball America as the Best Athlete within the Padres organization. In 2009, Darnell was a Baseball America Top 100 Prospect. Following the 2009 season, Darnell was ranked the Padres' number 3 prospect.

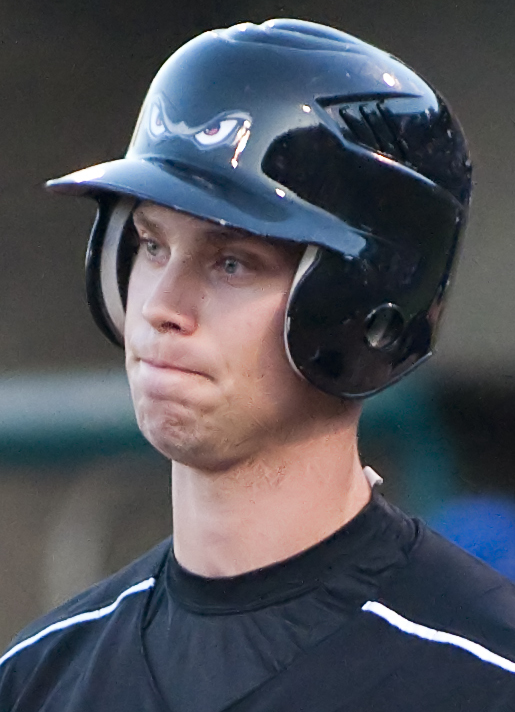
Darnell with the Lake Elsinore Storm in 2009

Darnell was promoted to the Single–A Fort Wayne TinCaps of the Midwest League in 2009. He hit .329 with 17 doubles, seven home runs, and 38 RBI in 66 games with the TinCaps. Darnell was selected as Mid-Season Mid-West League All-Star before his promotion to the High–A Lake Elsinore Storm of the California League. With the Storm he hit .294 with 18 doubles, 13 home runs, and 43 RBI in 60 games giving him a combined total of a .311 average with 35 doubles, four triples, 20 home runs, 81 RBI, eight stolen bases, and 87 walks. At season's end, Darnell was named as the Padres' Organizational Player of the Year by MLB.com.

Darnell played for the Double–A San Antonio Missions during the 2011 season. James hit .333 with 17 home runs, 62 RBI, a .434 on-base percentage (OBP), and a .604 slugging percentage (SLG) in only 76 games. He was selected as Texas League Player of the Week, Mid-Season All-Star, MVP of the Texas League All-Star Game, Baseball America Double-A All-Star, and selected to participate in the 2011 XM Futures Game at Chase Field. During Darnell's Minor League career, he played in 407 games, compiled a .297 average, hit 63 home runs, drove in 264 runs, .394 OBP, and .502 SLG.

Darnell made his major league debut at Citi Field in New York on August 8, 2011. In 18 games for the Padres during his rookie campaign, he batted .222/.294/.333 with one home run (off of Wade Miley), seven RBI, and one stolen base. Following the season, Darnell underwent surgery to repair the labrum in his shoulder.

Darnell made 7 appearances for San Diego in 2012, going 4-for-17 (.235) with 1 home run and 1 RBI, which came against Stephen Strasburg. On May 17, 2012, Darnell left a game against the Los Angeles Dodgers after injuring his shoulder while attempting to catch a Tony Gwynn Jr. fly ball. He was placed on the 60-day disabled list on May 28, and missed the remainder of the season. Darnell subsequently underwent arthroscopic surgery to repair the injury in August.

On May 14, 2013, while playing for the Triple-A Tucson Padres, Darnell dislocated his left shoulder, an injury which ultimately proved to be season-ending. Following the acquisition of Pedro Ciriaco on June 14, Darnell was designated for assignment by San Diego. He was released by the organization on June 21.

=== Tampa Bay Rays ===
On January 6, 2014, Darnell signed a minor league contract with the Tampa Bay Rays. He began the season on the injured list of the Triple-A Durham Bulls as he continued to recover from his third left shoulder surgery. After ultimately never appearing in a game for the organization, Darnell became a free agent after the 2014 season.
