= Derrin Ebanks =

Caymanian footballer

Personal information
- Full name: Derrin Kennedy Ebanks
- Date of birth: 16 December 1988 (age 37)
- Place of birth: Cayman Islands
- Position: Midfielder

Team information
- Current team: Elite SC

Senior career*
Years	Team	Apps	(Gls)
2007–?	Elite SC		

International career^{‡}
2011–	Cayman Islands	3	(0)
- * Club domestic league appearances and goals ‡ National team caps and goals as of 05:54, 20 April 2012 (UTC)

Derrin Kennedy Ebanks (born 16 December 1988) is a Caymanian footballer who plays as a midfielder. He represented the Cayman Islands during World Cup qualifying matches in 2011.
