= Junctional epidermolysis bullosa =

Junctional epidermolysis bullosa may refer to:

- Junctional epidermolysis bullosa (medicine)
- Junctional epidermolysis bullosa (veterinary medicine)
