= Jeb Sharp =

Jeb Sharp is an American radio journalist. She is an editor and correspondent for Public Radio International's program The World. She won the Lowell Thomas Award from the Overseas Press Club for best radio news or interpretation of international affairs in 2003 and in 2008. Other honors include the Sigma Delta Chi Award from the Society of Professional Journalists and the Dart Award for Excellence in Coverage of Trauma in 2009. Sharp was a Nieman Fellow at Harvard University in 2006 and she was awarded a residency at Hedgebrook, a retreat for women writers, in 1995. She attended the Graduate School of Journalism at U.C. Berkeley and began her career at KCAW-FM in Sitka, Alaska. She has also worked at WBUR, a public radio station, in Boston, Massachusetts.
