= Jeb Stuart (disambiguation) =

J. E. B. Stuart (1833–1864) was a Confederate general in the American Civil War.

Jeb Stuart may also refer to:

- Jeb Stuart (writer) (born 1956), an American filmmaker
- J. E. B. Stuart High School, in Fairfax, Virginia renamed Justice High School in 2018
- Jeb Stuart Jr. and Jeb Stuart III, characters in the Southern Victory series by Harry Turtledove

== See also ==
- Jeb Stuart Magruder (1934–2014), an American political operative and Watergate conspirator
