= Jedd Ebanks =

Caymanian footballer

Personal information
- Full name: Donovan Jedd Ebanks
- Date of birth: 2 February 1988 (age 38)
- Place of birth: Cayman Islands
- Position: Defender

Team information
- Current team: Elite SC

Senior career*
Years	Team	Apps	(Gls)
2007–	Elite SC		

International career^{‡}
- Cayman Islands U20
- Cayman Islands U23
2008–	Cayman Islands	8	(0)
- * Club domestic league appearances and goals ‡ National team caps and goals as of 07:44, 9 April 2012 (UTC)

Donovan Jedd Ebanks (born 2 February 1988) is a Caymanian footballer who plays as a defender. He has represented the Cayman Islands during World Cup qualifying matches in 2008 and 2011
