= Jed Hoyer =

Major League Baseball executive (born 1973)

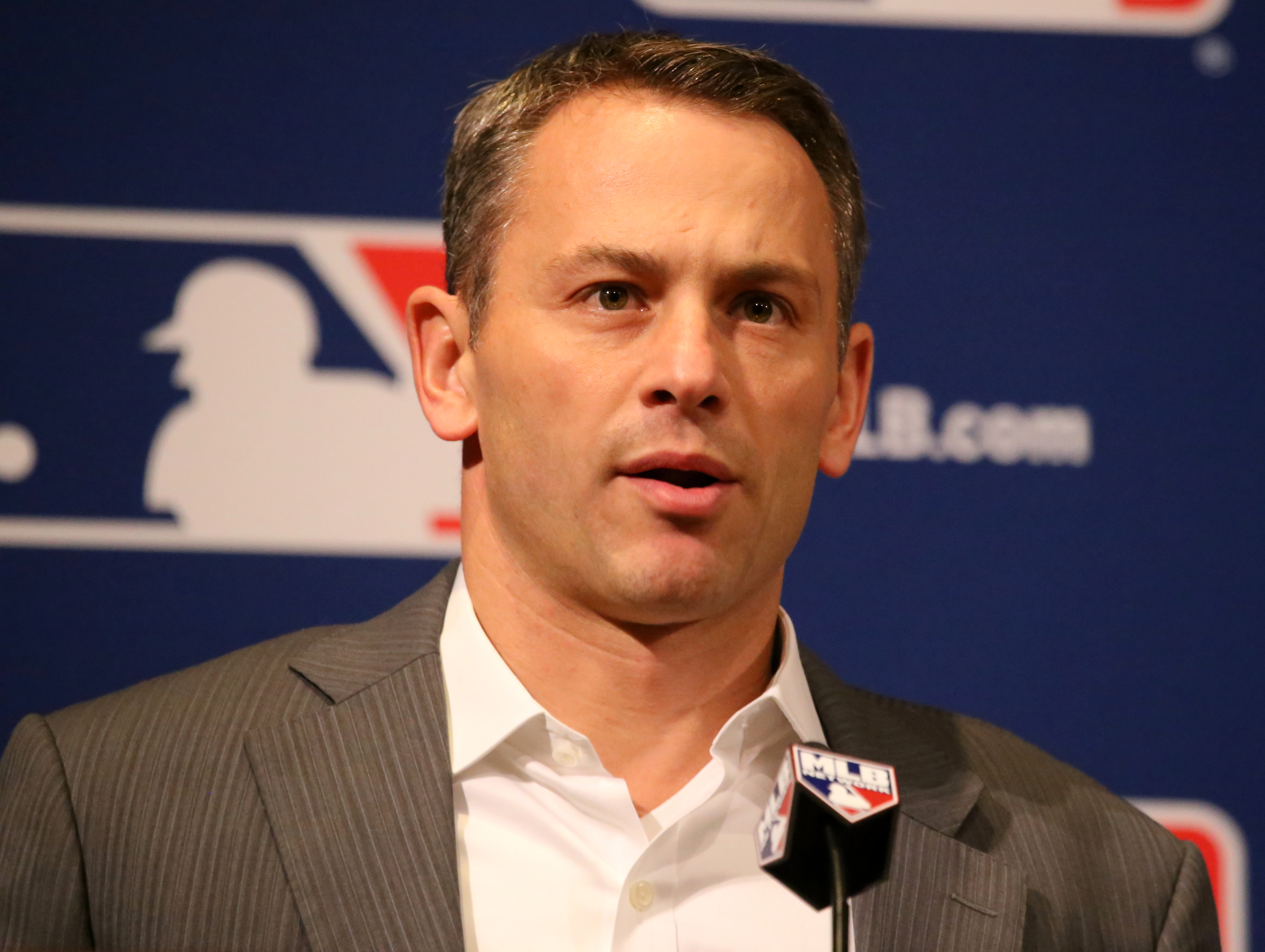
- Hoyer at the 2015 Winter Meetings

Chicago Cubs
- President of Baseball Operations
- Born: December 7, 1973 (age 52); Plymouth, New Hampshire, U.S.

Teams
- Boston Red Sox (2002–2009); San Diego Padres (2010–2011); Chicago Cubs (2012–present)

Career highlights and awards
- 3x World Series champion (2004, 2007, 2016)

Jed Hoyer (born December 7, 1973) is an American sports executive who is the president of baseball operations for the Chicago Cubs of Major League Baseball (MLB). He has been the general manager of the San Diego Padres and the assistant general manager of the Boston Red Sox.

== Early and personal life ==
Hoyer was born in Plymouth, New Hampshire, and is Jewish.

Hoyer graduated from the Holderness School in Holderness, New Hampshire, where his mother was the school nurse and his father was the school doctor, in 1992. He then went to Wesleyan University in Connecticut, majoring in American history, where he was a shortstop and star pitcher who shares Wesleyan's career saves record with Sam Elias and Nick Miceli. During his time at Wesleyan University he was also initiated into and is a brother of Delta Kappa Epsilon. In 1995, he played collegiate summer baseball with the Bourne Braves of the Cape Cod Baseball League, and the Waterbury Barons of the New England Collegiate Baseball League, seeing innings on the mound and at shortstop. Hoyer worked in the admissions office and then the alumni/development office, and was also a baseball coach at the university after graduating. He worked in the admissions department of Kenyon College before joining the Red Sox at 28.

He married Merrill Muckerman in June 2010 in St. Louis.

== Baseball career ==
He joined the Red Sox in 2002, after the ownership of John W. Henry, Tom Werner, and Larry Lucchino took over the team from John Harrington. He worked as assistant to the general manager until December 2005. He then was given the title of assistant general manager. Hoyer briefly served as co-general manager of the Red Sox from December 12, 2005, to January 19, 2006, and then returning to his previous job of assistant general manager. In November 2003, he accompanied general manager Theo Epstein to Arizona to persuade pitcher Curt Schilling to accept a trade to the Red Sox, spending Thanksgiving at Schilling's home in what was eventually a successful effort.

=== Boston Red Sox ===
When Epstein left his position on October 31, 2005, Hoyer was part of a group of four executives, called the "Gang of Four", that kept the club running in Epstein's absence. Other members of the "gang" were Ben Cherington, Bill Lajoie, and Craig Shipley, a group which completed trades for, among others, Josh Beckett, Mike Lowell, Mark Loretta, and Andy Marte. Shortly after the winter meetings were completed in early December, Hoyer and Cherington were promoted to co-general managers, where they remained until Epstein returned to his original position on January 19, 2006, after a 10-week hiatus. Hoyer was also a key player in decision-making regarding players and their contracts. Beginning in 2008, he became the first "Resident Expert" for the Fenway neighborhood on Povo.com, a local wiki whose platform lets one share their insider's knowledge of Boston.

Following the 2007 season, Hoyer interviewed to become general manager of the Pittsburgh Pirates, a job that went to Neal Huntington of the Cleveland Indians organization. Similarly, during the 2009 season, Hoyer interviewed to become the GM of the Washington Nationals, who appointed their own assistant GM, Mike Rizzo, to the top spot.

=== San Diego Padres ===
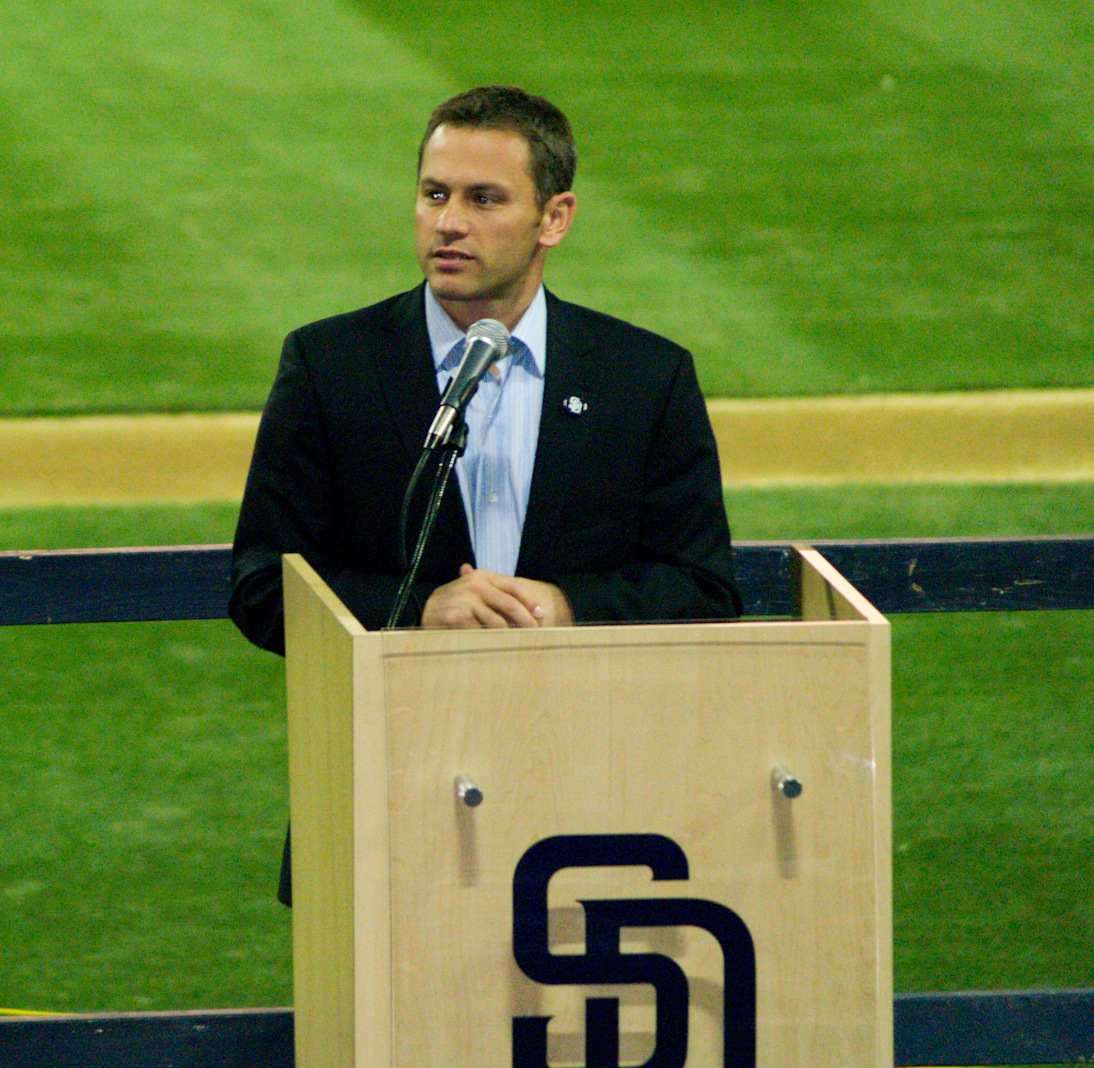
Jed Hoyer in 2011

In October 2009 he was hired as the San Diego Padres' general manager. Perhaps his best known deal as GM of the Padres was when he sent 1B Adrián González to the Red Sox in exchange for RHP Casey Kelly, OF Reymond Fuentes, utility man Eric Patterson, and 1B Anthony Rizzo.

=== Chicago Cubs ===
On October 26, 2011, the Chicago Cubs announced that Jed Hoyer and Jason McLeod had joined the club. Hoyer became the general manager, while McLeod would work in the scouting department. The Cubs announced that compensation for Hoyer would be worked out before the Rule 5 Draft.

In September 2016 the Cubs signed him to a five-year contract through 2021. On November 17, 2020, the Cubs named Hoyer president of baseball operations, taking over following Epstein's resignation. He signed another five-year deal in November 2020, running through 2025. On July 29, 2025, Hoyer and the Cubs reached another contract extension.
