= 2012 San Diego Padres season =

2012 San Diego Padres
- League: National League
- Division: West
- Ballpark: Petco Park
- City: San Diego, California
- Record: 76–86 (.469)
- Divisional place: 4th
- Owners: Jeff Moorad
- General managers: Josh Byrnes
- Managers: Bud Black
- Television: Fox Sports San Diego (Dick Enberg, Mark Grant, Tony Gwynn, Andy Masur); Cablemas (Spanish)
- Radio: XX Sports Radio (Ted Leitner, Jerry Coleman, Bob Scanlan, Andy Masur); XEMO-AM (Spanish) (Eduardo Otega, Juan Angel Avila)

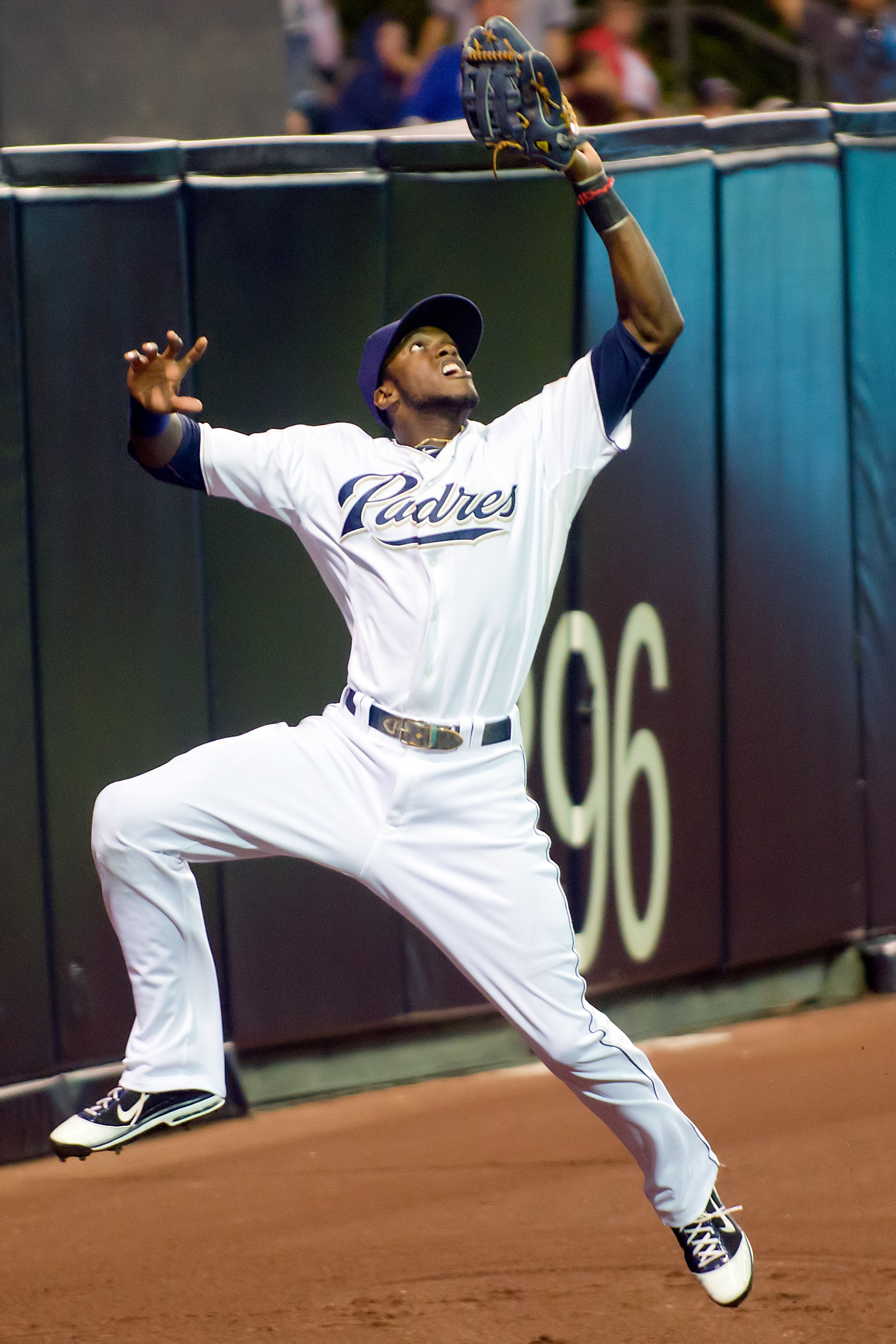
Cameron Maybin, outfielder

The San Diego Padres' 2012 season was their 44th season in MLB, and their eighth at Petco Park. The Padres finished with a record of 76–86, fourth place in the National League West.

== 2011–2012 offseason ==
=== Free agents ===
The following free agents were not re-signed from the final roster of the Padres 2011 season.

| Player | New team |
|---|---|
| Heath Bell | Miami Marlins |
| Aaron Harang | Los Angeles Dodgers |
| Brad Hawpe | Texas Rangers |
| Chad Qualls | Philadelphia Phillies |

=== Trades ===
On December 17, 2011, pitcher Mat Latos was traded to the Cincinnati Reds for right-handed starting pitcher Edinson Vólquez and three of the Reds' top 10 prospects—first baseman Yonder Alonso, catcher Yasmani Grandal and right-handed relief pitcher Brad Boxberger. Latos was 27–29 in 72 career starts with a 3.37 ERA. Volquez had not returned to form since undergoing elbow reconstruction surgery in 2009. Alonso moved ahead of Anthony Rizzo on the Padres's depth chart at first base. Grandal was the third catcher on the Padres' 40-man roster, joining Nick Hundley and John Baker. Boxberger was the top Double-A closer in the minor leagues in 2011.

On January 6, 2012, the Padres acquired right handed pitcher Andrew Cashner and outfielder Kyung-Min Na from the Chicago Cubs for Rizzo and right-handed starting pitcher Zach Cates.

== Regular season ==
The Padres started the season 20–41, the worst record in the major leagues at the time. By June 20, they were 22 games under .500.

Starting pitcher Casey Kelly, obtained in the 2010 trade of Adrián González to the Boston Red Sox, made his major league debut with San Diego on August 27, 2012. Kelly earned a win after pitching six shutout innings in a 3–0 victory over the Atlanta Braves. He also recorded his first major league hit in the game. Kelly was the 15th different starting pitcher used by the Padres in 2012, which matched a club record set in 2002 and tied in 2009. The Padres ended the season with 24 pitchers throwing at least 15 innings.

Third baseman Chase Headley was rumored to be traded but was kept at the trade deadline in July. He was named the National League Player of the Week for the week ending August 12. He was later named National League Player of the Month for August, becoming the first Padre to be so honored since Tony Gwynn won the award in May 1997. Headley that month was tied for the major league lead in home runs (10) and led the majors with 31 RBIs. He hit .306 (33-for-108) in August with 20 runs scored and a .611 slugging percentage. He earned a second consecutive Player of the Month honor in September after hitting .324 that month with nine homers, 30 RBIs, a .410 on-base percentage, and a .645 slugging percentage. He was the second Padre to win Player of the Month in consecutive months, the first being third baseman Ken Caminiti in August and September of 1996. He became the first Padre to ever have more than one 30-RBI month. Over the final 57 games of the season, he batted .313 with 19 homers, 44 runs scored and 63 RBIs.

The Padres went 5–10 over their last 15 games, losing five consecutive series by 2–1 margins. However, San Diego was 42–33 after the All-Star break. They finished the season with a 76–86 record for a five-game improvement from 2011.

Headley led the NL in RBIs with 115, joining former Padre and Hall of Fame outfielder Dave Winfield (118 in 1979) as the only Padres to lead the league in RBIs. Headley set career highs in hits (173), runs (95), home runs (31), walks (86), RBIs, total bases (301), on-base percentage (.376) and slugging percentage (.498) and matched career highs in games played (161), doubles (31) and steals (17). He reached base in 146 games, breaking the Padres record held by Gwynn (144 in 1987). Shortstop Everth Cabrera became the first Padre to lead the NL in stolen bases with 44. He set a team record with a 91.7 percent success rate on steals (44-for-48), which also led the NL.

Headley was unanimously voted the Padre Player of the Year by writers covering the team, and Clayton Richard was the unanimous pick as the Padres Pitcher of the Year. Headley also won a Gold Glove Award after leading all major league third basemen in games played (159) and assists (315) and the NL in total chances (425).

=== Season standings ===
==== NL West standings ====
NL West
| Team | W | L | Pct. | GB | Home | Road |
|---|---|---|---|---|---|---|
| San Francisco Giants | 94 | 68 | .580 | — | 48‍–‍33 | 46‍–‍35 |
| Los Angeles Dodgers | 86 | 76 | .531 | 8 | 45‍–‍36 | 41‍–‍40 |
| Arizona Diamondbacks | 81 | 81 | .500 | 13 | 41‍–‍40 | 40‍–‍41 |
| San Diego Padres | 76 | 86 | .469 | 18 | 42‍–‍39 | 34‍–‍47 |
| Colorado Rockies | 64 | 98 | .395 | 30 | 35‍–‍46 | 29‍–‍52 |

==== NL Wild Card ====
Division leaders
| Team | W | L | Pct. |
|---|---|---|---|
| Washington Nationals | 98 | 64 | .605 |
| Cincinnati Reds | 97 | 65 | .599 |
| San Francisco Giants | 94 | 68 | .580 |

Wild Card teams (Top 2 teams qualify for postseason)
| Team | W | L | Pct. | GB |
|---|---|---|---|---|
| Atlanta Braves | 94 | 68 | .580 | +6 |
| St. Louis Cardinals | 88 | 74 | .543 | — |
| Los Angeles Dodgers | 86 | 76 | .531 | 2 |
| Milwaukee Brewers | 83 | 79 | .512 | 5 |
| Philadelphia Phillies | 81 | 81 | .500 | 7 |
| Arizona Diamondbacks | 81 | 81 | .500 | 7 |
| Pittsburgh Pirates | 79 | 83 | .488 | 9 |
| San Diego Padres | 76 | 86 | .469 | 12 |
| New York Mets | 74 | 88 | .457 | 14 |
| Miami Marlins | 69 | 93 | .426 | 19 |
| Colorado Rockies | 64 | 98 | .395 | 24 |
| Chicago Cubs | 61 | 101 | .377 | 27 |
| Houston Astros | 55 | 107 | .340 | 33 |

=== Record vs. opponents ===
2012 National League record Source: MLB Standings Grid – 2012
| Team | AZ | ATL | CHC | CIN | COL | MIA | HOU | LAD | MIL | NYM | PHI | PIT | SD | SF | STL | WSH | AL |
|---|---|---|---|---|---|---|---|---|---|---|---|---|---|---|---|---|---|
| Arizona | – | 2–5 | 5–4 | 2–5 | 9–7 | 5–3 | 6–0 | 12–6 | 3–3 | 3–4 | 2–4 | 3–4 | 7–11 | 9–9 | 1–5 | 2–4 | 9–6 |
| Atlanta | 5–2 | – | 3–4 | 1–5 | 6–1 | 14–4 | 4–2 | 3–3 | 3–3 | 12–6 | 12–6 | 3–4 | 4–3 | 3–4 | 5–1 | 8–10 | 8–10 |
| Chicago | 4–5 | 4–3 | – | 4–12 | 2–4 | 8–5 | 2–4 | 2–4 | 4–13 | 4–2 | 2–4 | 8–8 | 3–3 | 1–6 | 7–10 | 1–6 | 5–10 |
| Cincinnati | 5–2 | 5–1 | 12–4 | – | 5–1 | 10–5 | 2–4 | 3–3 | 9–6 | 6–2 | 3–4 | 11–7 | 6–2 | 4–3 | 6–7 | 2–5 | 7–8 |
| Colorado | 7–9 | 1–6 | 4–2 | 1–5 | – | 5–2 | 5–2 | 8–10 | 5–1 | 5–2 | 2–7 | 2–4 | 8–10 | 4–14 | 2–5 | 4–3 | 2–13 |
| Houston | 0–6 | 2–4 | 5–8 | 5–10 | 2–5 | – | 2–4 | 2–4 | 8–9 | 4–2 | 3–3 | 5–12 | 3–5 | 1–8 | 4–11 | 1–7 | 6–9 |
| Los Angeles | 6–12 | 3–3 | 4–2 | 4–2 | 10–8 | 4–2 | – | 4–2 | 1–6 | 4–3 | 5–2 | 6–1 | 11–7 | 8-10 | 6–5 | 4–2 | 6–9 |
| Miami | 3–5 | 4–14 | 4–2 | 3–3 | 4–3 | – | 4-2 | 2-4 | 4–4 | 4–12 | 8–10 | 1–4 | 5–1 | 5–2 | 2–5 | 9–9 | 5–13 |
| Milwaukee | 3–3 | 3–3 | 13–4 | 6–9 | 1–5 | 9–8 | 6–1 | 4–4 | – | 3–2 | 2–5 | 11–4 | 3–4 | 2–4 | 6–9 | 3–5 | 6–9 |
| New York | 4–3 | 6–12 | 2–4 | 2–6 | 2–5 | 2–4 | 3–4 | 12–4 | 2–3 | – | 10–8 | 5–2 | 4–3 | 4–4 | 4–3 | 4–14 | 8–7 |
| Philadelphia | 4–2 | 6–12 | 4–2 | 4–3 | 7–2 | 10–8 | 3–3 | 2–5 | 5–2 | 8–10 | – | 3–4 | 4–3 | 2–4 | 5–2 | 9-9 | 5–10 |
| Pittsburgh | 4–3 | 2–3 | 8–8 | 7–11 | 4–2 | 4–1 | 12–5 | 1–6 | 4–11 | 2–5 | 4–3 | – | 1–5 | 3–3 | 8–7 | 3–2 | 10–8 |
| San Diego | 11–7 | 3–4 | 3–3 | 2–6 | 10–8 | 5–3 | 7–11 | 1–5 | 4–3 | 3–4 | 3–4 | 5–1 | – | 6–12 | 3–3 | 2–3 | 8–7 |
| San Francisco | 9–9 | 4–3 | 6–1 | 3–4 | 14–4 | 2–5 | 8–1 | 10–8 | 4–2 | 4–4 | 4–2 | 3–3 | 12–6 | – | 3–3 | 1–5 | 7–8 |
| St. Louis | 5–1 | 1–5 | 10–7 | 7–6 | 5–2 | 11–4 | 5–6 | 5–2 | 9–6 | 3–4 | 3–4 | 7–8 | 3–3 | 3–3 | – | 3–4 | 8–7 |
| Washington | 4–2 | 10–8 | 6–1 | 5–2 | 3–4 | 7–1 | 2–4 | 9–9 | 5–3 | 14–4 | 9-9 | 2–3 | 3–2 | 5-1 | 4-3 | – | 10–8 |

=== Game log ===
Legend
| | Padres win |
| | Padres loss |
| | Postponement |
| **Bold** | Padres team member |

2012 Game Log
April (7–17)

| # | Date | Opponent | Score | Win | Loss | Save | Attendance | Record | Box |
|---|---|---|---|---|---|---|---|---|---|
| 1 | April 5 | Dodgers | L 3–5 | Lindblom (1–0) | **Vólquez** (0–1) | Guerra (1) | 42,941 | 0–1 | |
| 2 | April 6 | Dodgers | L 0–6 | Billingsley (1–0) | **Luebke** (0–1) | | 32,490 | 0–2 | |
| 3 | April 7 | Dodgers | L 5–6 (11) | Coffey (1–0) | **Bass** (0–1) | Guerra (2) | 31,909 | 0–3 | |
| 4 | April 8 | Dodgers | **W 8–4** | **Richard** (1–0) | Harang (0–1) | | 19,021 | 1–3 | |
| 5 | April 10 | Diamondbacks | L 2–4 (11) | Breslow (1–0) | **Owings** (0–1) | Putz (3) | 18,652 | 1–4 | |
| 6 | April 11 | Diamondbacks | **W 2–1** | **Frieri** (1–0) | Hernandez (0–1) | **Street** (1) | 16,091 | 2–4 | |
| 7 | April 12 | Diamondbacks | L 1–3 | Kennedy (2–0) | **Owings** (0–2) | Putz (4) | 20,858 | 2–5 | |
| 8 | April 13 | @ Dodgers | L 8–9 | Jansen (2–0) | **Cashner** (0–1) | | 31,601 | 2–6 | |
| 9 | April 14 | @ Dodgers | L 2–8 | Lilly (1–0) | **Wieland** (0–1) | | 46,549 | 2–7 | |
| 10 | April 15 | @ Dodgers | L 4–5 | Guerra (1–0) | **Brach** (0–1) | | 38,359 | 2–8 | |
| 11 | April 16 | @ Rockies | **W 7–1** | **Luebke** (1–1) | Guthrie (1–1) | | 21,547 | 3–8 | |
| 12 | April 17 | @ Rockies | L 3–5 | Moyer (1–2) | **Bass** (0–2) | Betancourt (3) | 24,525 | 3–9 | |
| 13 | April 18 | @ Rockies | L 4–8 | Nicasio (1–0) | **Richard** (1–1) | | 24,762 | 3–10 | |
| 14 | April 19 | Phillies | L 0–2 | Worley (1–1) | **Wieland** (0–2) | Papelbon (4) | 17,573 | 3–11 | |
| 15 | April 20 | Phillies | L 1–4 | Hamels (2–1) | **Vólquez** (0–2) | Papelbon (5) | 23,748 | 3–12 | |
| 16 | April 21 | Phillies | **W 5–1** | **Luebke** (2–1) | Halladay (3–1) | | 31,437 | 4–12 | |
| 17 | April 22 | Phillies | **W 6–1** | **Bass** (1–2) | Blanton (1–3) | | 26,759 | 5–12 | |
| 18 | April 24 | Nationals | L 1–3 | González (2–0) | **Richard** (1–2) | Rodríguez (5) | 16,599 | 5–13 | |
| 19 | April 25 | Nationals | L 2–7 | Zimmermann (1–1) | **Wieland** (0–3) | Gorzelanny (1) | 15,154 | 5–14 | |
| 20 | April 26 | Nationals | **W 2–1** | **Cashner** (1–1) | Clippard (1–2) | **Street** (2) | 18,356 | 6–14 | |
| 21 | April 27 | @ Giants | **W 5–3** | **Luebke** (3–1) | Hacker (0–1) | **Street** (3) | 41,908 | 7–14 | |
| 22 | April 28 | @ Giants | L 1–2 | Lincecum (2–2) | **Bass** (1–3) | Casilla (3) | 42,375 | 7–15 | |
| 23 | April 29 | @ Giants | L 1–4 | Bumgarner (4–1) | **Richard** (1–3) | Casilla (4) | 42,060 | 7–16 | |
| 24 | April 30 | Brewers | L 3–8 | Wolf (2–2) | **Wieland** (0–4) | | 16,218 | 7–17 | |

May (10–18)

| # | Date | Opponent | Score | Win | Loss | Save | Attendance | Record | Box |
|---|---|---|---|---|---|---|---|---|---|
| 25 | May 1 | Brewers | **W 2–0** | **Cashner** (2–1) | Rodríguez (0–3) | **Street** (4) | 19,260 | 8–17 | |
| 26 | May 2 | Brewers | **W 5–0** | **Suppan** (1–0) | Gallardo (1–3) | | 15,786 | 9–17 | |
| 27 | May 4 | Marlins | L 8–9 (12) | Cishek (4–0) | **Spence** (0–1) | | 29,201 | 9–18 | |
| 28 | May 5 | Marlins | L 1–4 | Buehrle (2–4) | **Richard** (1–4) | | 25,076 | 9–19 | |
| 29 | May 6 | Marlins | L 3–6 | Nolasco (4–0) | **Cashner** (2–2) | Mujica (2) | 33,572 | 9–20 | |
| 30 | May 7 | Rockies | **W 3–2** | **Vólquez** (1–2) | Pomeranz (0–2) | **Thayer** (1) | 15,895 | 10–20 | |
| 31 | May 8 | Rockies | **W 3–1** | **Suppan** (2–0) | White (0–1) | **Thayer** (2) | 17,478 | 11–20 | |
| 32 | May 9 | Rockies | L 2–6 | Friedrich (1–0) | **Bass** (1–4) | | 20,059 | 11–21 | |
| 33 | May 11 | @ Phillies | L 3–7 | Worley (3–2) | **Richard** (1–5) | | 44,056 | 11–22 | |
| 34 | May 12 | @ Phillies | **W 2–1** | **Vólquez** (2–2) | Halladay (3–3) | **Thayer** (3) | 45,542 | 12–22 | |
| 35 | May 13 | @ Phillies | L 2–3 | Hamels (5–1) | **Suppan** (2–1) | Papelbon (10) | 45,442 | 12–23 | |
| 36 | May 14 | @ Nationals | L 5–8 | Stammen (3–0) | **Mikolas** (0–1) | Burnett (1) | 19,434 | 12–24 | |
| 37 | May 15 | @ Nationals | **W 6–1** | **Bass** (2–4) | Strasburg (3–1) | | 23,902 | 13–24 | |
| 38 | May 16 | Dodgers | **W 4–2** | **Richard** (2–5) | Capuano (5–1) | **Thayer** (4) | 21,019 | 14–24 | |
| 39 | May 17 | Dodgers | L 1–8 | Harang (3–2) | **Vólquez** (2–3) | | 27,883 | 14–25 | |
| 40 | May 18 | Angels | L 2–7 | Weaver (6–1) | **Suppan** (2–2) | | 31,389 | 14–26 | |
| 41 | May 19 | Angels | **W 3–2** | **Gregerson** (1–0) | Haren (1–5) | **Thayer** (5) | 43,427 | 15–26 | |
| 42 | May 20 | Angels | **W 3–2** (13) | **Mikolas** (1–1) | Pauley (0–1) | | 33,975 | 16–26 | |
| 43 | May 21 | @ Cardinals | L 3–4 | Motte (3–1) | **Cashner** (2–3) | | 40,360 | 16–27 | |
| 44 | May 22 | @ Cardinals | L 0–4 | Wainwright (3–5) | **Vólquez** (2–4) | | 39,151 | 16–28 | |
| 45 | May 23 | @ Cardinals | L 3–6 | Lynn (7–1) | **Suppan** (2–3) | Motte (8) | 40,715 | 16–29 | |
| 46 | May 24 | @ Mets | **W 11–5** | **Stults** (1–0) | Hefner (0–2) | | 24,109 | 17–29 | |
| 47 | May 25 | @ Mets | L 1–6 | Gee (4–3) | **Bass** (2–5) | | 24,498 | 17–30 | |
| 48 | May 26 | @ Mets | L 0–9 | Santana (2–2) | **Richard** (2–6) | | 28,745 | 17–31 | |
| 49 | May 27 | @ Mets | L 0–2 | Dickey (7–1) | **Vólquez** (2–5) | Francisco (13) | 28,361 | 17–32 | |
| 50 | May 28 | @ Cubs | L 7–11 | Wells (1–1) | **Hinshaw** (0–1) | | 38,452 | 17–33 | |
| 51 | May 29 | @ Cubs | L 3–5 | Samardzija (5–3) | **Stults** (1–1) | Russell (1) | 35,219 | 17–34 | |
| 52 | May 30 | @ Cubs | L 6–8 | Russell (2–0) | **Thayer** (0–1) | | 38,516 | 17–35 | |

June (12–15)

| # | Date | Opponent | Score | Win | Loss | Save | Attendance | Record | Box |
|---|---|---|---|---|---|---|---|---|---|
| 53 | June 1 | Diamondbacks | **W 7–1** | **Cashner** (3–3) | Miley (6–2) | | 27,054 | 18–35 | |
| 54 | June 2 | Diamondbacks | L 2–4 | Hudson (2–1) | **Thatcher** (0–1) | Putz (12) | 36,559 | 18–36 | |
| 55 | June 3 | Diamondbacks | L 0–6 | Cahill (3–5) | **Stults** (1–2) | | 32,228 | 18–37 | |
| 56 | June 5 | Giants | **W 6–5** | **Street** (1–0) | Edlefsen (0–1) | | 30,662 | 19–37 | |
| 57 | June 6 | Giants | L 5–6 | Bumgarner (7–4) | **Richard** (2–7) | Romo (3) | 22,269 | 19–38 | |
| 58 | June 7 | Giants | L 3–8 | Cain (7–2) | **Marquis** (2–5) | Casilla (15) | 22,015 | 19–39 | |
| 59 | June 8 | @ Brewers | L 5–9 | Marcum (5–3) | **Vólquez** (2–6) | | 32,759 | 19–40 | |
| 60 | June 9 | @ Brewers | **W 5–2** | **Ohlendorf** (1–0) | Fiers (1–2) | **Street** (5) | 41,604 | 20–40 | |
| 61 | June 10 | @ Brewers | L 5–6 | Gallardo (5–5) | **Bass** (2–6) | Veras (1) | 43,021 | 20–41 | |
| 62 | June 12 | @ Mariners | **W 5–4** | **Richard** (3–7) | Hernández (4–5) | **Street** (6) | 13,084 | 21–41 | |
| 63 | June 13 | @ Mariners | **W 1–0** | **Marquis** (3–5) | Noesí (2–7) | **Street** (7) | 13,931 | 22–41 | |
| 64 | June 14 | @ Mariners | **W 6–2** | **Vólquez** (3–6) | Ramírez (0–1) | | 17,306 | 23–41 | |
| 65 | June 15 | @ Athletics | L 2–10 | Blackley (1–2) | **Bass** (2–7) | Scribner (1) | 24,528 | 23–42 | |
| 66 | June 16 | @ Athletics | L 4–6 | Doolittle (1–0) | **Thatcher** (0–2) | Cook (3) | 17,135 | 23–43 | |
| 67 | June 17 | @ Athletics | **W 2–1** | **Richard** (4–7) | Colón (6–7) | **Street** (8) | 21,631 | 24–43 | |
| 68 | June 18 | Rangers | L 1–2 | Harrison (9–3) | **Marquis** (3–6) | Nathan (14) | 29,315 | 24–44 | |
| 69 | June 19 | Rangers | L 3–7 | Feldman (1–6) | **Vólquez** (3–7) | | 25,889 | 24–45 | |
| 70 | June 20 | Rangers | L 2–4 | Darvish (9–4) | **Thayer** (0–2) | Nathan (15) | 23,942 | 24–46 | |
| 71 | June 22 | Mariners | **W 9–5** | **Richard** (5–7) | Millwood (3–6) | **Street** (9) | 30,053 | 25–46 | |
| 72 | June 23 | Mariners | L 1–5 | Hernández (5–5) | **Marquis** (3–7) | | 30,922 | 25–47 | |
| 73 | June 24 | Mariners | **W 2–0** | **Vólquez** (4–7) | Noesí (2–9) | **Street** (10) | 27,529 | 26–47 | |
| 74 | June 25 | @ Astros | **W 8–7 (10)** | **Thayer** (1–2) | Lyon (0–2) | **Street** (11) | 14,483 | 27–47 | |
| 75 | June 26 | @ Astros | L 3–5 | Lyles (2–4) | **Wells** (0–1) | Myers (17) | 15,416 | 27–48 | |
| 76 | June 27 | @ Astros | L 0–1 | Harrell (7–6) | **Richard** (5–8) | | 15,012 | 27–49 | |
| 77 | June 28 | @ Astros | **W 7–3** | **Vincent** (1–0) | Myers (0–3) | | 19,415 | 28–49 | |
| 78 | June 29 | @ Rockies | L 2–10 | Francis (1–1) | **Marquis** (3–8) | | 42,785 | 28–50 | |
| 79 | June 30 | @ Rockies | **W 8–4** | **Vólquez** (5–7) | Guthrie (3–7) | | 48,169 | 29–50 | |

July (15–11)

| # | Date | Opponent | Score | Win | Loss | Save | Attendance | Record | Box |
|---|---|---|---|---|---|---|---|---|---|
| 80 | July 1 | @ Rockies | **W 2–0** | **Wells** (1–1) | Pomeranz (0–3) | **Street** (12) | 31,829 | 30–50 | |
| 81 | July 2 | @ Diamondbacks | **W 6–2** | **Richard** (6–8) | Cahill (6–7) | **Thatcher** (1) | 19,633 | 31–50 | |
| 82 | July 3 | @ Diamondbacks | **W 9–5** | **Ohlendorf** (2–0) | Bauer (0–1) | | 21,329 | 32–50 | |
| 83 | July 4 | @ Diamondbacks | **W 8–6** | **Gregerson** (2–0) | Hernandez (1–2) | **Street** (13) | 48,819 | 33–50 | |
| 84 | July 5 | Reds | **W 2–1** | **Street** (2–0) | Ondrusek (3–2) | | 25,181 | 34–50 | |
| 85 | July 6 | Reds | L 0–6 | Arroyo (4–5) | **Wells** (1–2) | | 26,016 | 34–51 | |
| 86 | July 7 | Reds | L 5–6 | Bailey (7–6) | **Richard** (6–9) | Chapman (10) | 34,222 | 34–52 | |
| 87 | July 8 | Reds | L 2–4 | Cueto (10–5) | **Marquis** (3–9) | Chapman (11) | 24,032 | 34–53 | |
| 88 | July 13 | @ Dodgers | L 1–2 | Kershaw (7–5) | **Richard** (6–10) | Jansen (16) | 43,873 | 34–54 | |
| 89 | July 14 | @ Dodgers | **W 7–6** | **Hinshaw** (1–1) | Jansen (4–3) | **Street** (14) | 54,014 | 35–54 | |
| 90 | July 15 | @ Dodgers | **W 7–2** | **Marquis** (4–9) | Capuano (9–5) | | 39,715 | 36–54 | |
| 91 | July 16 | Astros | L 0–2 | Happ (7–9) | **Wells** (1–3) | Myers (19) | 26,098 | 36–55 | |
| 92 | July 17 | Astros | **W 8–2** | **Ohlendorf** (3–0) | Lyles (2–6) | | 20,944 | 37–55 | |
| 93 | July 18 | Astros | **W 8–4** | **Richard** (7–10) | Rodríguez (7–8) | **Street** (15) | 25,713 | 38–55 | |
| 94 | July 19 | Astros | **W 1–0** | **Vólquez** (6–7) | Harrell (7–7) | | 26,735 | 39–55 | |
| 95 | July 20 | Rockies | **W 9–5** | **Marquis** (5–9) | Pomeranz (1–5) | | 25,507 | 40–55 | |
| 96 | July 21 | Rockies | L 6–8 (12) | Torres (1–0) | **Thatcher** (0–3) | Betancourt (16) | 37,174 | 40–56 | |
| 97 | July 22 | Rockies | **W 3–2** | **Thayer** (2–2) | Ottavino (2–1) | **Street** (16) | 25,198 | 41–56 | |
| 98 | July 23 | @ Giants | L 1–7 | Vogelsong (8–4) | **Richard** (7–11) | | 42,430 | 41–57 | |
| 99 | July 24 | @ Giants | L 2–3 | Casilla (4–4) | **Thatcher** (0–4) | | 42,559 | 41–58 | |
| 100 | July 25 | @ Giants | **W 6–3** | **Marquis** (6–9) | Lincecum (4–11) | **Street** (17) | 41,871 | 42–58 | |
| 101 | July 27 | @ Marlins | **W 7–2** | **Wells** (2–3) | Zambrano (5–9) | | 23,161 | 43–58 | |
| 102 | July 28 | @ Marlins | L 2–4 | Eovaldi (2–6) | **Ohlendorf** (3–1) | Cishek (4) | 26,401 | 43–59 | |
| 103 | July 29 | @ Marlins | L 4–5 (10) | Webb (4–2) | **Brach** (0–2) | | 27,730 | 43–60 | |
| 104 | July 30 | @ Reds | **W 11–5** | **Vólquez** (7–7) | Leake (4–7) | | 28,140 | 44–60 | |
| 105 | July 31 | @ Reds | L 6–7 | Marshall (4–3) | **Marquis** (6–10) | Chapman (22) | 20,356 | 44–61 | |

August (18–10)

| # | Date | Opponent | Score | Win | Loss | Save | Attendance | Record | Box |
|---|---|---|---|---|---|---|---|---|---|
| 106 | August 1 | @ Reds | L 4–6 | Arroyo (7–6) | **Wells** (2–4) | Chapman (23) | 20,527 | 44–62 | |
| 107 | August 2 | @ Reds | L 4–9 | Cueto (14–5) | **Ohlendorf** (3–2) | | 22,396 | 44–63 | |
| 108 | August 3 | Mets | **W 3–1** | **Richard** (8–11) | Dickey (14–3) | **Street** (18) | 34,573 | 45–63 | |
| 109 | August 4 | Mets | L 2–6 | Hefner (2–4) | **Vólquez** (7–8) | Francisco (19) | 36,826 | 45–64 | |
| 110 | August 5 | Mets | **W 7–3** | **Marquis** (7–10) | Harvey (1–2) | | 24,635 | 46–64 | |
| 111 | August 6 | Cubs | **W 2–0** | **Stults** (2–2) | Wood (4–8) | **Street** (19) | 27,187 | 47–64 | |
| 112 | August 7 | Cubs | **W 7–4** | **Ohlendorf** (4–2) | Raley (0–1) | **Street** (20) | 26,518 | 48–64 | |
| 113 | August 8 | Cubs | **W 2–0** | **Richard** (9–11) | Samardzija (7–10) | | 24,663 | 49–64 | |
| 114 | August 10 | @ Pirates | **W 9–8** | **Brach** (1–2) | Watson (5–2) | **Street** (21) | 38,702 | 50–64 | |
| 115 | August 11 | @ Pirates | **W 5–0** | **Marquis** (8–10) | Burnett (14–4) | | 39,485 | 51–64 | |
| 116 | August 12 | @ Pirates | L 5–11 | Bédard (7–12) | **Ohlendorf** (4–3) | | 35,352 | 51–65 | |
| 117 | August 13 | @ Braves | **W 4–1** | **Stults** (3–2) | Minor (6–9) | **Thayer** (6) | 18,250 | 52–65 | |
| 118 | August 14 | @ Braves | L 0–6 | Hudson (12–4) | **Richard** (9–12) | | 16,427 | 52–66 | |
| 119 | August 15 | @ Braves | L 1–6 | Maholm (11–7) | **Vólquez** (7–9) | | 16,302 | 52–67 | |
| 120 | August 16 | @ Braves | L 0–6 | Medlen (4–1) | **Marquis** (8–11) | | 33,157 | 52–68 | |
| 121 | August 17 | Giants | L 1–10 | Cain (12–5) | **Ohlendorf** (4–4) | | 38,755 | 52–69 | |
| 122 | August 18 | Giants | L 7–8 | Mijares (3–2) | **Brach** (1–3) | Hensley (3) | 33,849 | 52–70 | |
| 123 | August 19 | Giants | **W 7–1** | **Richard** (10–12) | Vogelsong (10–7) | | 28,605 | 53–70 | |
| 124 | August 20 | Pirates | **W 3–1** | **Vólquez** (8–9) | Correia (9–8) | **Thayer** (7) | 20,401 | 54–70 | |
| 125 | August 21 | Pirates | **W 7–5 (10)** | **Mikolas** (2–1) | McCutchen (0–1) | | 21,882 | 55–70 | |
| 126 | August 22 | Pirates | **W 4–2** | **Werner** (1–0) | McDonald (11–6) | **Layne** (1) | 20,311 | 56–70 | |
| 127 | August 24 | @ Diamondbacks | **W 5–0** | **Stults** (4–2) | Corbin (5–5) | | 32,726 | 57–70 | |
| 128 | August 25 | @ Diamondbacks | **W 9–3** | **Richard** (11–12) | Kennedy (11–11) | | 27,619 | 58–70 | |
| 129 | August 26 | @ Diamondbacks | **W 5–4** | **Vólquez** (9–9) | Cahill (9–11) | **Gregerson** (1) | 28,172 | 59–70 | |
| 130 | August 27 | Braves | **W 3–0** | **Kelly** (1–0) | Maholm (11–9) | **Gregerson** (2) | 20,590 | 60–70 | |
| 131 | August 28 | Braves | L 0–2 | Medlen (6–1) | **Werner** (1–1) | Kimbrel (32) | 20,955 | 60–71 | |
| 132 | August 29 | Braves | **W 8–2** | **Stults** (5–2) | Hanson (12–7) | | 16,845 | 61–71 | |
| 133 | August 31 | @ Rockies | **W 5–4** | **Richard** (12–12) | White (2–7) | **Gregerson** (3) | 27,366 | 62–71 | |

September (13–13)

| # | Date | Opponent | Score | Win | Loss | Save | Attendance | Record | Box |
|---|---|---|---|---|---|---|---|---|---|
| 134 | September 1 | @ Rockies | L 1–9 | Chacín (2–4) | **Vólquez** (9–10) | | 30,152 | 62–72 | |
| 135 | September 2 | @ Rockies | L 10–11 | Moscoso (1–1) | **Brach** (1–4) | Betancourt (27) | 30,678 | 62–73 | |
| 136 | September 3 | @ Dodgers | L 3–4 (11) | League (1–6) | **Burns** (0–1) | | 33,540 | 62–74 | |
| 137 | September 4 | @ Dodgers | **W 6–3 (11)** | **Layne** (1–0) | Ely (0–1) | **Gregerson** (4) | 40,619 | 63–74 | |
| 138 | September 5 | @ Dodgers | **W 4–3** | **Vincent** (2–0) | Tolleson (1–1) | **Layne** (2) | 50,560 | 64–74 | |
| 139 | September 7 | Diamondbacks | **W 6–5** | **Brach** (2–4) | Hernandez (2–3) | **Gregerson** (5) | 25,403 | 65–74 | |
| 140 | September 8 | Diamondbacks | L 5–8 | Miley (15–9) | **Kelly** (1–1) | Putz (29) | 25,514 | 65–75 | |
| 141 | September 9 | Diamondbacks | **W 8–2** | **Werner** (2–1) | Corbin (5–7) | | 21,037 | 66–75 | |
| 142 | September 10 | Cardinals | **W 11–3** | **Stults** (6–2) | García (4–7) | | 18,081 | 67–75 | |
| 143 | September 11 | Cardinals | **W 6–4** | **Vólquez** (10–10) | Wainwright (13–13) | **Gregerson** (6) | 29,887 | 68–75 | |
| 144 | September 12 | Cardinals | **W 3–2** | **Richard** (13–12) | Lohse (14–3) | **Gregerson** (7) | 16,442 | 69–75 | |
| 145 | September 14 | Rockies | L 4–7 | Moscoso (3–1) | **Cashner** (3–4) | Betancourt (29) | 25,018 | 69–76 | |
| 146 | September 15 | Rockies | **W 4–3** | **Kelly** (2–1) | Pomeranz (1–9) | **Gregerson** (8) | 27,651 | 70–76 | |
| 147 | September 16 | Rockies | **W 12–11** | **Thatcher** (1–4) | Belisle (3–7) | | 22,948 | 71–76 | |
| 148 | September 18 | @ Diamondbacks | L 2–3 | Kennedy (14–11) | **Stults** (6–3) | Putz (30) | 20,811 | 71–77 | |
| 149 | September 19 | @ Diamondbacks | L 2–6 | Cahill (12–11) | **Vólquez** (10–11) | | 21,013 | 71–78 | |
| 150 | September 20 | @ Diamondbacks | **W 6–5** | **Richard** (14–12) | Skaggs (1–3) | **Bass** (1) | 17,821 | 72–78 | |
| 151 | September 21 | @ Giants | L 1–5 | Vogelsong (13–9) | **Kelly** (2–2) | | 41,728 | 72–79 | |
| 152 | September 22 | @ Giants | L 4–8 | Bumgarner (16–10) | **Werner** (2–2) | | 42,418 | 72–80 | |
| 153 | September 23 | @ Giants | **W 6–4** | **Stults** (7–3) | Hensley (4–4) | **Street** (22) | 41,511 | 73–80 | |
| 154 | September 25 | Dodgers | **W 2–1** | **Vólquez** (11–11) | Beckett (6–14) | **Street** (23) | 32,346 | 74–80 | |
| 155 | September 26 | Dodgers | L 2–8 | Harang (10–10) | **Richard** (14–13) | | 24,818 | 74–81 | |
| 156 | September 27 | Dodgers | L 4–8 | Capuano (12–11) | **Kelly** (2–3) | | 32,403 | 74–82 | |
| 157 | September 28 | Giants | L 1–3 | Vogelsong (14–9) | **Werner** (2–3) | Casilla (25) | 32,691 | 74–83 | |
| 158 | September 29 | Giants | **W 7–3** | **Stults** (8–3) | Bumgarner (16–11) | | 42,397 | 75–83 | |
| 159 | September 30 | Giants | L 5–7 | Loux (1–0) | **Street** (2–1) | Romo (13) | 33,407 | 75–84 | |

October (1–2)

| # | Date | Opponent | Score | Win | Loss | Save | Attendance | Record | Box |
|---|---|---|---|---|---|---|---|---|---|
| 160 | October 1 | @ Brewers | L 3–5 | Marcum (7-4) | **Richard** (14-14) | Axford (34) | 30,398 | 75-85 | |
| 161 | October 2 | @ Brewers | L 3–4 | Henderson (1-2) | Bass (2-8) | Axford (35) | 30,714 | 76-85 | |
| 162 | October 3 | @ Brewers | **W 7–6** | **Layne** (2–0) | Henderson (1–3) | **Gregerson** (9) | 34,451 | 76–86 | |

=== Roster ===
2012 San Diego Padres
**Roster**
| **Pitchers**: 45 Anthony Bass; 29 Brad Boxberger; 58 Brad Brach; 61 Cory Burns; 34 Andrew Cashner; 39 Ernesto Frieri; 57 Luke Gregerson; 41 Alex Hinshaw; 49 Casey Kelly; 40 Tom Layne; 52 Cory Luebke; 38 Jason Marquis; 39 Miles Mikolas; 26 Dustin Moseley; 59 Ross Ohlendorf; 27 Micah Owings; 40 Matt Palmer; 33 Clayton Richard; 44 Josh Spence; 46 Tim Stauffer; 16 Huston Street; 53 Eric Stults; 38 Jeff Suppan; 54 Joe Thatcher; 55 Dale Thayer; 50 Nick Vincent; 37 Edinson Vólquez; 60 Kip Wells; 41 Andrew Werner; 43 Joe Wieland | **Catchers**: 21 John Baker; 12 Yasmani Grandal; 4 Nick Hundley; 1 Eddy Rodríguez; 63 Ali Solis; **Infielders**: 23 Yonder Alonso; 5 Alexi Amarista; 8 Jason Bartlett; 88 Kyle Blanks; 2 Everth Cabrera; 11 Logan Forsythe; 7 Chase Headley; 1 Orlando Hudson; 3 Andy Parrino | **Outfielders**: 22 James Darnell; 13 Chris Denorfia; 15 Jesús Guzmán; 47 Jeremy Hermida; 14 Mark Kotsay; 24 Cameron Maybin; 18 Carlos Quentin; 9 Blake Tekotte; 25 Will Venable | **Manager**: 20 Bud Black; **Coaches**: 36 Darren Balsley (pitching); 81 Griffin Benedict (bullpen catcher); 80 Justin Hatcher (bullpen catcher); 30 Glenn Hoffman (third base); 56 Jimmy Jones (bullpen); 71 Mark Merila (bullpen catcher); 28 Phil Plantier (hitting); 32 Alonzo Powell (assistant hitting); 17 Rick Renteria (bench); 10 Dave Roberts (first base) |

== Player stats ==
=== Batting ===
Note: G = Games played; AB = At bats; R = Runs; H = Hits; 2B = Doubles; 3B = Triples; HR = Home runs; RBI = Runs batted in; SB = Stolen bases; BB = Walks; AVG = Batting average; SLG = Slugging average

| Player | G | AB | R | H | 2B | 3B | HR | RBI | SB | BB | AVG | SLG |
|---|---|---|---|---|---|---|---|---|---|---|---|---|
| Chase Headley | 161 | 604 | 95 | 173 | 31 | 2 | 31 | 115 | 17 | 86 | .286 | .498 |
| Yonder Alonso | 155 | 549 | 47 | 150 | 39 | 0 | 9 | 62 | 3 | 62 | .273 | .393 |
| Cameron Maybin | 147 | 507 | 67 | 123 | 20 | 5 | 8 | 45 | 26 | 44 | .243 | .349 |
| Will Venable | 148 | 417 | 62 | 110 | 26 | 8 | 9 | 45 | 24 | 41 | .264 | .429 |
| Everth Cabrera | 115 | 398 | 49 | 98 | 19 | 3 | 2 | 24 | 44 | 43 | .246 | .324 |
| Chris Denorfia | 130 | 348 | 56 | 102 | 19 | 6 | 8 | 36 | 13 | 27 | .293 | .451 |
| Logan Forsythe | 91 | 315 | 45 | 86 | 13 | 3 | 6 | 26 | 8 | 28 | .273 | .390 |
| Jesús Guzmán | 120 | 287 | 32 | 71 | 18 | 2 | 9 | 48 | 3 | 29 | .247 | .418 |
| Carlos Quentin | 86 | 284 | 44 | 74 | 21 | 0 | 16 | 46 | 0 | 36 | .261 | .504 |
| Alexi Amarista | 105 | 275 | 35 | 66 | 15 | 5 | 5 | 32 | 8 | 17 | .240 | .385 |
| Nick Hundley | 58 | 204 | 14 | 32 | 7 | 1 | 3 | 22 | 0 | 15 | .157 | .245 |
| John Baker | 63 | 193 | 17 | 46 | 8 | 0 | 0 | 14 | 2 | 20 | .238 | .280 |
| Yasmani Grandal | 60 | 192 | 28 | 57 | 7 | 1 | 8 | 36 | 0 | 31 | .297 | .469 |
| Mark Kotsay | 82 | 143 | 9 | 37 | 8 | 0 | 2 | 14 | 0 | 11 | .259 | .357 |
| Orlando Hudson | 35 | 123 | 11 | 26 | 0 | 5 | 1 | 11 | 3 | 8 | .211 | .317 |
| Andy Parrino | 55 | 116 | 9 | 24 | 5 | 0 | 1 | 6 | 1 | 17 | .207 | .276 |
| Jason Bartlett | 29 | 83 | 8 | 11 | 5 | 0 | 0 | 4 | 0 | 12 | .133 | .193 |
| Jeremy Hermida | 13 | 24 | 2 | 6 | 1 | 1 | 0 | 2 | 1 | 3 | .250 | .375 |
| James Darnell | 7 | 17 | 1 | 4 | 1 | 0 | 1 | 1 | 0 | 2 | .235 | .471 |
| Blake Tekotte | 11 | 15 | 0 | 2 | 0 | 0 | 0 | 0 | 1 | 0 | .133 | .133 |
| Eddy Rodríguez | 2 | 5 | 1 | 1 | 0 | 0 | 1 | 1 | 0 | 2 | .200 | .800 |
| Kyle Blanks | 4 | 5 | 0 | 1 | 0 | 0 | 0 | 0 | 0 | 1 | .200 | .200 |
| Alí Solís | 5 | 4 | 0 | 0 | 0 | 0 | 0 | 0 | 0 | 0 | .000 | .000 |
| Pitcher totals | 162 | 314 | 19 | 39 | 9 | 1 | 1 | 20 | 1 | 4 | .124 | .169 |
| Team totals | 162 | 5422 | 651 | 1339 | 272 | 43 | 121 | 610 | 155 | 539 | .247 | .380 |

=== Pitching ===
Note: W = Wins; L = Losses; ERA = Earned run average; G = Games pitched; GS = Games started; SV = Saves; IP = Innings pitched; H = Hits allowed; R = Runs allowed; ER = Earned runs allowed; BB = Walks allowed; SO = Strikeouts

| Player | W | L | ERA | G | GS | SV | IP | H | R | ER | BB | SO |
|---|---|---|---|---|---|---|---|---|---|---|---|---|
| Clayton Richard | 14 | 14 | 3.99 | 33 | 33 | 0 | 218.2 | 228 | 110 | 97 | 42 | 107 |
| Edinson Vólquez | 11 | 11 | 4.14 | 32 | 32 | 0 | 182.2 | 160 | 88 | 84 | 105 | 174 |
| Anthony Bass | 2 | 8 | 4.73 | 24 | 15 | 1 | 97.0 | 89 | 59 | 51 | 39 | 80 |
| Jason Marquis | 6 | 7 | 4.04 | 15 | 15 | 0 | 93.2 | 94 | 53 | 42 | 28 | 79 |
| Eric Stults | 8 | 3 | 2.92 | 18 | 14 | 0 | 92.1 | 86 | 36 | 30 | 23 | 51 |
| Luke Gregerson | 2 | 0 | 2.39 | 77 | 0 | 9 | 71.2 | 57 | 19 | 19 | 21 | 72 |
| Brad Brach | 2 | 4 | 3.78 | 67 | 0 | 0 | 66.2 | 50 | 28 | 28 | 33 | 75 |
| Dale Thayer | 2 | 2 | 3.43 | 64 | 0 | 7 | 57.2 | 53 | 24 | 22 | 12 | 47 |
| Ross Ohlendorf | 4 | 4 | 7.77 | 13 | 9 | 0 | 48.2 | 62 | 44 | 42 | 24 | 39 |
| Andrew Cashner | 3 | 4 | 4.27 | 33 | 5 | 0 | 46.1 | 42 | 23 | 22 | 19 | 52 |
| Andrew Werner | 2 | 3 | 5.58 | 8 | 8 | 0 | 40.1 | 45 | 26 | 25 | 14 | 35 |
| Huston Street | 2 | 1 | 1.85 | 40 | 0 | 23 | 39.0 | 17 | 8 | 8 | 11 | 47 |
| Kip Wells | 2 | 4 | 4.58 | 7 | 7 | 0 | 37.1 | 41 | 23 | 19 | 20 | 19 |
| Miles Mikolas | 2 | 1 | 3.62 | 25 | 0 | 0 | 32.1 | 32 | 15 | 13 | 15 | 23 |
| Joe Thatcher | 1 | 4 | 3.41 | 55 | 0 | 1 | 31.2 | 30 | 13 | 12 | 14 | 39 |
| Cory Luebke | 3 | 1 | 2.61 | 5 | 5 | 0 | 31.0 | 28 | 10 | 9 | 8 | 23 |
| Jeff Suppan | 2 | 3 | 5.28 | 6 | 6 | 0 | 30.2 | 34 | 19 | 18 | 13 | 7 |
| Casey Kelly | 2 | 3 | 6.21 | 6 | 6 | 0 | 29.0 | 39 | 23 | 20 | 10 | 26 |
| Alex Hinshaw | 1 | 1 | 4.50 | 31 | 0 | 0 | 28.0 | 23 | 14 | 14 | 20 | 36 |
| Joe Wieland | 0 | 4 | 4.55 | 5 | 5 | 0 | 27.2 | 26 | 16 | 14 | 9 | 24 |
| Brad Boxberger | 0 | 0 | 2.60 | 24 | 0 | 0 | 27.2 | 22 | 12 | 8 | 18 | 33 |
| Nick Vincent | 2 | 0 | 1.71 | 27 | 0 | 0 | 26.1 | 19 | 5 | 5 | 7 | 28 |
| Cory Burns | 0 | 1 | 5.50 | 17 | 0 | 0 | 18.0 | 26 | 11 | 11 | 10 | 18 |
| Tommy Layne | 2 | 0 | 3.24 | 26 | 0 | 2 | 16.2 | 9 | 6 | 6 | 3 | 25 |
| Ernesto Frieri | 1 | 0 | 2.31 | 11 | 0 | 0 | 11.2 | 9 | 5 | 3 | 4 | 18 |
| Josh Spence | 0 | 1 | 4.35 | 11 | 0 | 0 | 10.1 | 13 | 5 | 5 | 5 | 10 |
| Micah Owings | 0 | 2 | 2.79 | 6 | 0 | 0 | 9.2 | 8 | 4 | 3 | 5 | 7 |
| Tim Stauffer | 0 | 0 | 5.40 | 1 | 1 | 0 | 5.0 | 7 | 4 | 3 | 3 | 5 |
| Dustin Moseley | 0 | 0 | 9.00 | 1 | 1 | 0 | 5.0 | 5 | 5 | 5 | 2 | 4 |
| Matt Palmer | 0 | 0 | 9.00 | 3 | 0 | 0 | 2.0 | 2 | 2 | 2 | 2 | 2 |
| Team totals | 76 | 86 | 4.01 | 162 | 162 | 43 | 1434.2 | 1356 | 710 | 640 | 539 | 1205 |

== Farm system ==
| Level | Team | League | Manager |
|---|---|---|---|
| AAA | Tucson Padres | Pacific Coast League | Terry Kennedy |
| AA | San Antonio Missions | Texas League | John Gibbons |
| A | Lake Elsinore Storm | California League | Shawn Wooten |
| A | Fort Wayne TinCaps | Midwest League | José Valentín |
| A-Short Season | Eugene Emeralds | Northwest League | Pat Murphy |
| Rookie | AZL Padres | Arizona League | Jim Gabella |
