= Casey Kelly =

American baseball player (born 1989)

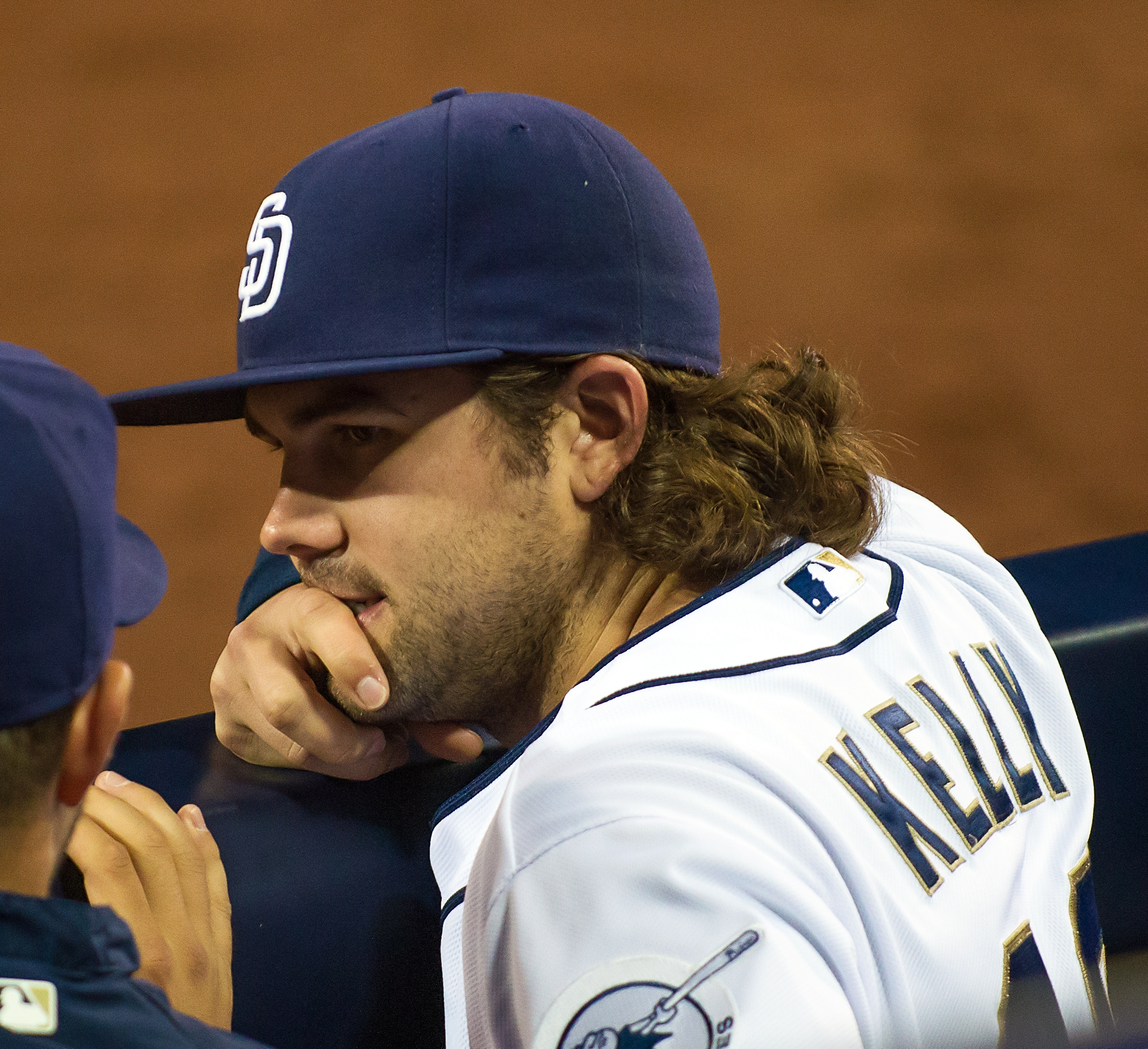
- Kelly with the San Diego Padres

Free agent
- Pitcher
- Born: October 4, 1989 (age 37); Sarasota, Florida, U.S.
- Bats: Right Throws: Right

Professional debut
- MLB: August 27, 2012, for the San Diego Padres
- KBO: March 24, 2019, for the LG Twins

MLB statistics (through 2025 season)
- Win–loss record: 2–11
- Earned run average: 5.34
- Strikeouts: 60

KBO statistics (through 2024 season)
- Win–loss record: 73–46
- Earned run average: 3.25
- Strikeouts: 753
- Stats at Baseball Reference

Teams
- San Diego Padres (2012, 2015); Atlanta Braves (2016); San Francisco Giants (2018); LG Twins (2019–2024); Cincinnati Reds (2024); Arizona Diamondbacks (2025)

Career highlights and awards
- KBO: KBO All–Star (2022); Korean Series champion (2023); KBO Wins leader (2022)

Casey Patrick Kelly (born October 4, 1989) is an American professional baseball pitcher who is a free agent. He has previously played in Major League Baseball (MLB) for the San Diego Padres, Atlanta Braves, San Francisco Giants, Cincinnati Reds, and Arizona Diamondbacks. He has also played in the KBO League for the LG Twins.

Kelly was selected by the Boston Red Sox in the first round, 30th overall, in the 2008 MLB draft. He was the top minor league prospect in the Red Sox organization when he was acquired by the San Diego Padres after the 2010 season, along with three other prospects, in exchange for All-Star player Adrián González. He made his MLB debut with the Padres in 2012.

== Professional career ==
=== Boston Red Sox ===
Kelly was drafted in the first round, 30th overall, in the 2008 Major League Baseball draft by the Boston Red Sox. He was drafted as a pitcher, though he wanted to play shortstop. Kelly was also offered a scholarship to play football for the University of Tennessee, as he was a two-time regional player of the year as a quarterback at Sarasota High School. Kelly chose baseball over football and signed with the Red Sox for a $3 million signing bonus, $700,000 more than the sixth player in the draft received.

Kelly played the first half of the 2009 season with the Greenville Drive and Salem Red Sox as a pitcher. He was elected to the All-Star Futures Game. He finished the second half of season as a shortstop. On December 8, 2009, Kelly announced his decision to continue his career as a full-time pitcher. He had hit .222 while striking out 27 percent of the time, while he had a 6–1 record with a 1.12 ERA pitching with Single-A Greenville.

Kelly played for the Double-A Portland Sea Dogs in 2010, posting a 5.31 ERA in 21 starts. In 2010 mid-season minor league prospect rankings, Kelly was ranked #10 by ESPN and #24 by Baseball America.

=== San Diego Padres ===
On December 6, 2010, Kelly was traded along with Anthony Rizzo, Reymond Fuentes, and Eric Patterson to the San Diego Padres for three-time All-Star first baseman Adrián González. Kelly was considered the top prospect in the Red Sox organization. Entering the 2011 season, he was ranked 22 among the Top 50 Prospects by MLB.com. The Padres invited Kelly as a non-roster player to their Major League camp for 2011 Spring Training. The top prospect in the Padres' Minor League system, Kelly opened the 2011 regular season in Double-A with the San Antonio Missions. He put up a 3.98 ERA with 105 strikeouts in 27 starts and 142 1/3 innings with San Antonio.

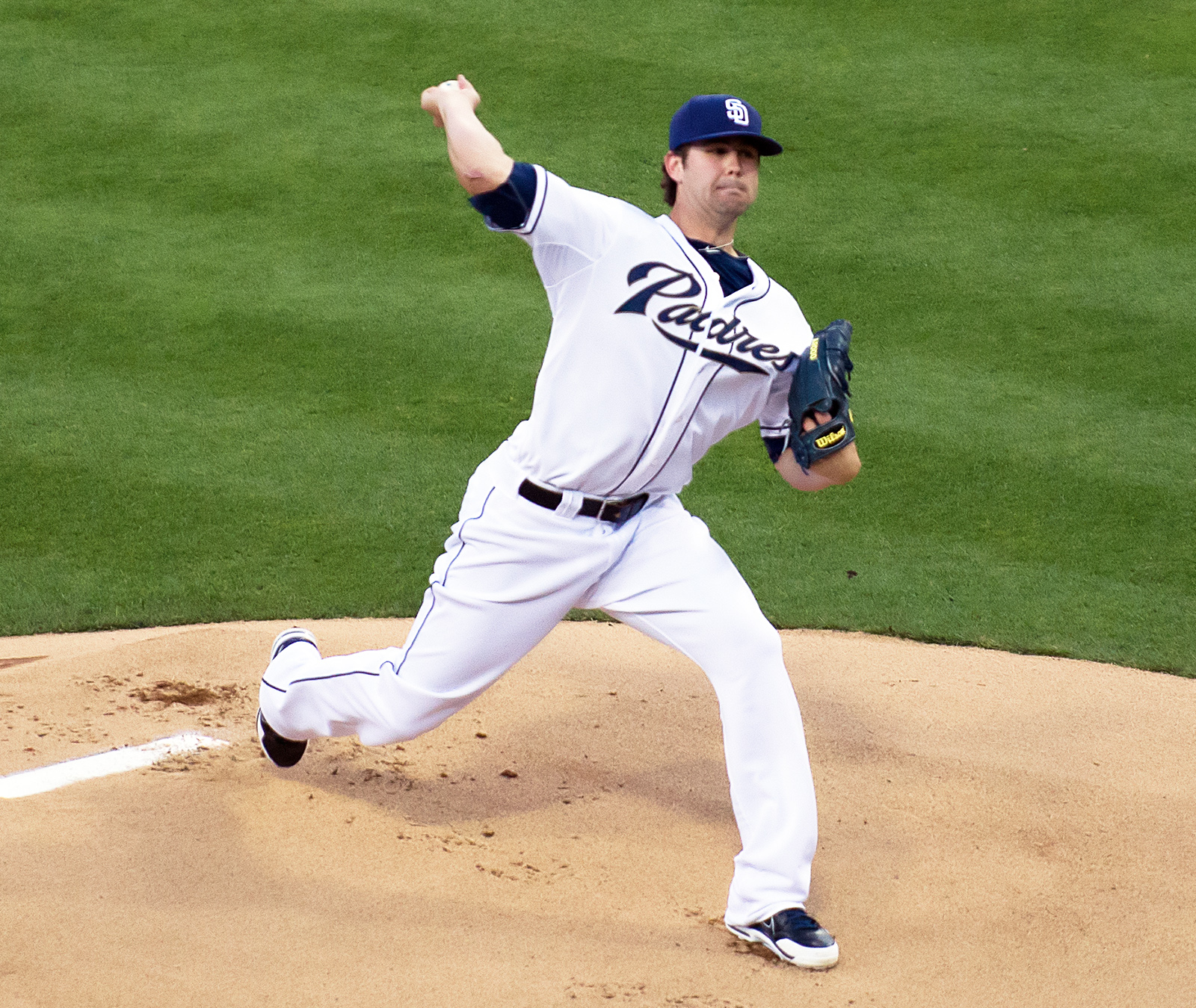
Kelly's first game in the Major Leagues in 2012

Kelly strained his elbow in his second start for Triple-A Tucson in April 2012. He started his rehabilitation with the rookie-league Arizona League Padres in July and then started three games for San Antonio. He was promoted to the Major Leagues to replace the injured Jason Marquis in San Diego's starting rotation. Kelly earned a win after pitching six shutout innings in a 3–0 victory over the Atlanta Braves in his Major League debut on August 27, 2012. He also recorded his first major league hit in the game. Kelly was the 15th different starting pitcher used by the Padres in 2012, which ties a club record. Kelly made six starts for the Padres in 2012, going 2–3 with a 6.21 ERA.

On March 22, 2013, it was announced that Kelly had micro tears in his UCL. He underwent Tommy John surgery on April 2 and was placed on the team's disabled list. He began throwing again in September and was still considered a premium prospect coming into 2014.

Kelly came back from injury in 2014 but only appeared in a couple of starts in the minors. In 2015, Kelly was converted into a reliever, appearing in 20 games, 6 starts in Double-A before being called up to the El Paso Chihuahuas, the Padres' Triple-A minor league affiliate.

=== Atlanta Braves ===
On December 10, 2015, the Padres traded Kelly and Ricardo Rodriguez to the Atlanta Braves for Christian Bethancourt. Kelly was assigned to the Triple-A Gwinnett Braves, and recalled to the major leagues on April 20, 2016. Three days later, he was optioned to Gwinnett. Kelly was recalled once again in May to make his first start with the Braves, giving up three runs in five innings in a 5–0 loss to the Philadelphia Phillies. In 10 appearances for Atlanta, he struggled to an 0-3 record and 5.82 ERA with 7 strikeouts across 21 2/3 innings pitched. On November 2, Kelly was removed from the 40-man roster and sent outright to Triple-A Gwinnett. He elected free agency on November 7.

=== Chicago Cubs ===
On January 27, 2017, Kelly signed a minor league contract with the Chicago Cubs and received an invitation to spring training. In 12 games (11 starts) for the Triple–A Iowa Cubs, he pitched to a 5–2 record and 4.65 ERA with 43 strikeouts in 60 innings of work. Kelly was released by the Cubs organization on July 20.

=== San Francisco Giants ===
On July 29, 2017, Kelly signed a minor league deal with the San Francisco Giants. In 7 starts down the stretch for the Triple–A Sacramento River Cats, he posted a 2–3 record and 4.17 ERA with 39 strikeouts in 41 innings of work. Kelly elected free agency following the season on November 6.

He re-signed with the Giants on a new minor league deal on February 25, 2018. Kelly was called up to relieve and start for the major league team in mid-August, due to other pitchers' injuries. In seven games (three starts), he went 0–3 with an ERA of 3.04 over 23 2/3 innings. On October 23, Kelly was removed from the 40–man roster and sent outright to Triple–A Sacramento.

=== LG Twins ===
On November 20, 2018, Kelly signed to a one-year, $1 million deal with the LG Twins of the KBO League for the 2019 season. He made 29 starts in 2019, compiling a 14–12 record and 2.55 ERA with 126 strikeouts across 180 1/3 innings pitched. Kelly re-signed with the team for the 2020 season on a $1.5 million contract. He made 28 starts that season, registering a 15–7 record and 3.32 ERA with 134 strikeouts over 173 1/3 innings of work. On December 10, 2020, Kelly re-signed with the Twins for the 2021 season on a $1.4 million contract. He made 30 starts for the Twins in 2021, posting a 13–8 record and 3.15 ERA with 142 strikeouts across 177 innings.

On December 12, 2021, Kelly re-signed with the Twins on a $1.2 million deal. Kelly was named a KBO All-Star for the team in 2022. He made 27 starts for the Twins, registering a 16–4 record and 2.54 ERA with 153 strikeouts across 166 1/3 innings pitched. On December 2, 2022, Kelly re-signed a one-year contract for the 2023 season worth $1.8 million. In 2023, he made 30 starts for the club, posting a 10–7 record and 3.83 ERA with 129 strikeouts across 178 2/3 innings of work, being the winning pitcher for the 2023 Korean Series.

On November 22, 2023, Kelly re-signed with LG on a one-year, $1.5 million contract. In 19 starts for LG, he compiled a 5–8 record and 4.51 ERA with 69 strikeouts across 113 2/3 innings pitched. On July 20, 2024, the Twins announced that they would be parting ways with Kelly.

=== Cincinnati Reds ===
On August 7, 2024, Kelly signed a minor league contract with the Cincinnati Reds. After two starts for the Triple–A Louisville Bats, the Reds selected Kelly's contract and added him to their active roster on August 24. In 2 games for Cincinnati, he allowed 3 runs on 5 hits with 4 strikeouts over 5 1/3 innings pitched. Kelly was designated for assignment by the Reds on August 29. He cleared waivers and was sent outright to Louisville on August 31. Kelly elected free agency on October 1.

=== Arizona Diamondbacks ===
On February 25, 2025, Kelly signed a minor league contract with the Arizona Diamondbacks. In 18 appearances (14 starts) for the Triple-A Reno Aces, he compiled a 2-5 record and 5.82 ERA with 42 strikeouts over 85 innings of work. On August 6, the Diamondbacks selected Kelly's contract, adding him to their active roster. He made two scoreless appearances for Arizona, recording no strikeouts over 1 2/3 innings. On November 6, Kelly was removed from the 40-man roster and sent outright to Reno. He elected free agency the same day.

== Awards ==
- 2008 Louisville Slugger Pre-Season High School First Team All-American
- Mr. Baseball Florida 2008
- Florida 6A Player of the Year 2008
- Red Sox ML Pitcher of the Month (April 2009)
- Carolina League Player of the Week (June 1–7, 2009)
- South Atlantic League All-Star (2009)
- Futures Game All-Star (2009)
- Carolina League Player of the Week (June 22–28, 2009)
- 2009 Red Sox Minor League Pitcher of the Year
- 2010 Portland Sea Dogs Pitcher of the Year

== Personal life ==
Kelly's father, Pat Kelly appeared in three major league games as a catcher. Kelly made his major league debut in 2012, on his father's 57th birthday.

== See also ==
- List of second-generation Major League Baseball players
