= John Baker (baseball) =

American baseball player (born 1981)

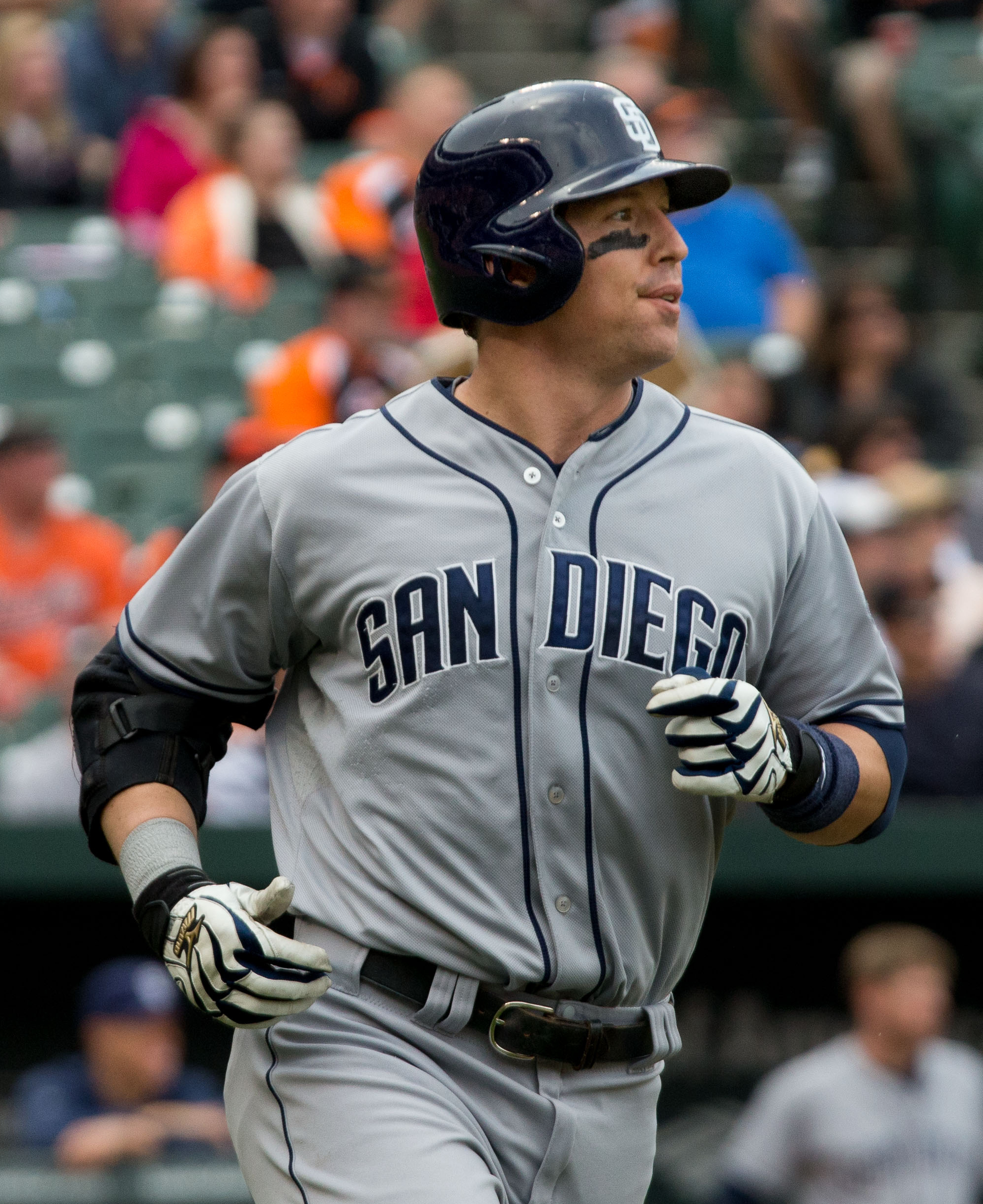
- Baker with the San Diego Padres
- Catcher
- Born: January 20, 1981 (age 44); Alameda, California, U.S.
- Batted: Left Threw: Right

MLB debut
- July 9, 2008, for the Florida Marlins

Last MLB appearance
- September 28, 2014, for the Chicago Cubs

MLB statistics
- Batting average: .247
- Home runs: 14
- Runs batted in: 120
- Stats at Baseball Reference

Teams
- Florida Marlins (2008–2011); San Diego Padres (2012–2013); Chicago Cubs (2014)

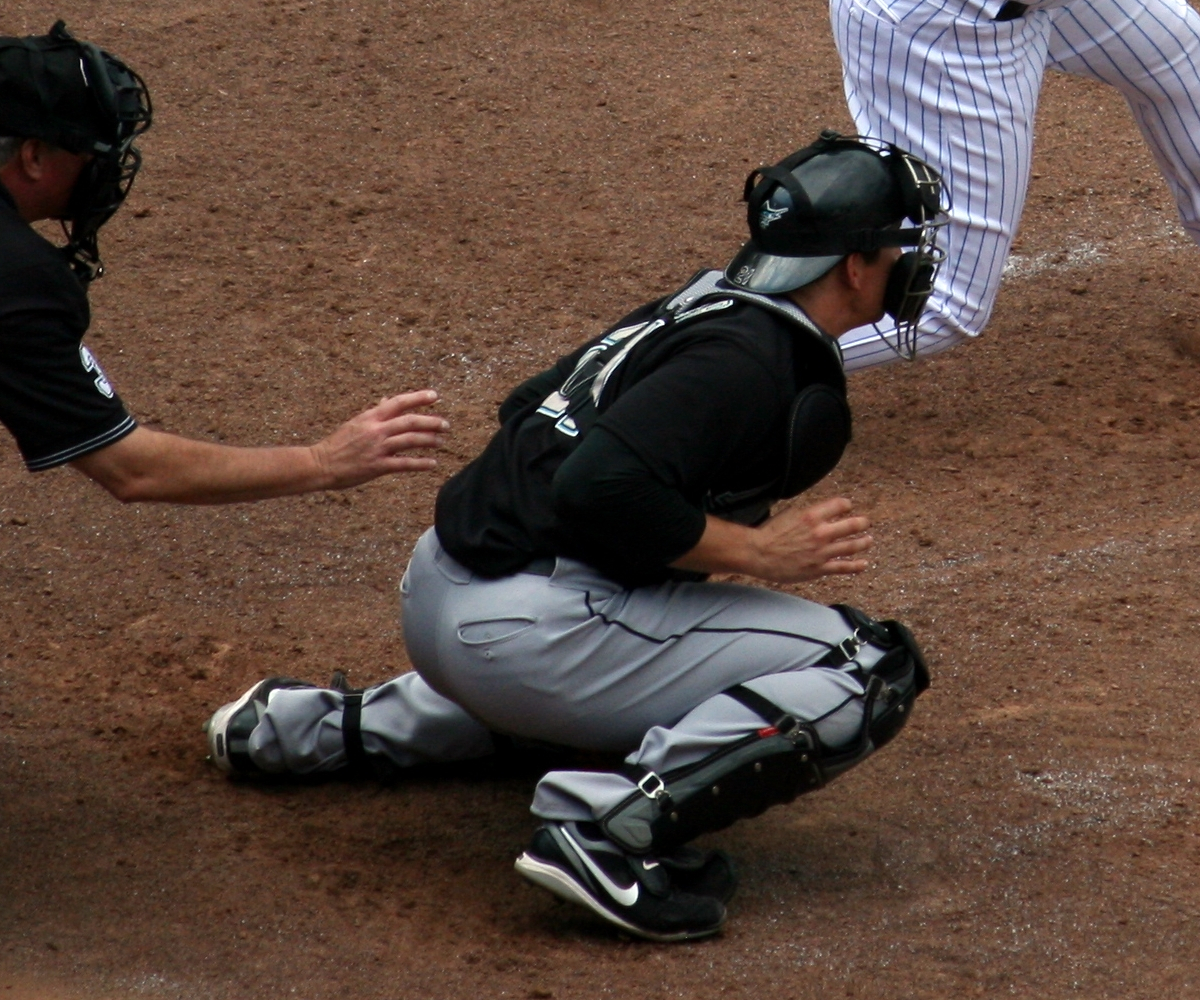
Baker playing for the Florida Marlins in 2009

John David Baker (born January 20, 1981) is an American former professional baseball catcher. He played for the Florida Marlins, San Diego Padres and Chicago Cubs of Major League Baseball (MLB). In December 2015, Baker was hired as a Baseball Operations Assistant by the Chicago Cubs

== Amateur career ==
Born in Alameda, California and raised in Walnut Creek, Baker graduated from De La Salle High School (Concord, California) in 1999 before attending the University of California, Berkeley. In 2000 and 2001, he played collegiate summer baseball in the Cape Cod Baseball League for the Yarmouth-Dennis Red Sox, where he received the league's 10th Player award in 2000 and was named a league all-star in 2001. As a junior in 2002, he led the Pac-10 Conference with a .383 batting average and was selected to the All-Pac-10 team.

== Professional career ==
=== Minor leagues ===
Baker was drafted in 2002 by the Oakland Athletics in the 4th round of the amateur draft. He was mentioned several times in Michael Lewis' 2003 book Moneyball. In March 2007, Baker was traded to the Florida Marlins for minor league first-baseman Jason Stokes.

=== Florida Marlins ===
Baker was called up to the majors on July 9, 2008, after Matt Treanor went on the disabled list. His first major league hit was a solo home run off Chan Ho Park of the Los Angeles Dodgers on July 10. In 2009 to 2010 Baker platooned with teammate Ronny Paulino; Baker played against right-handed pitchers while Paulino played against left-handed pitchers.

Baker went on the disabled list in May 2010 with a strained flexor tendon in his right arm. At the end of the 2010 season, he had Tommy John surgery when the elbow did not improve. He spent most of 2011 rehabbing and rejoined the Marlins that September, serving primarily as a pinch hitter.

=== San Diego Padres ===
On November 22, 2011, Baker was traded to the San Diego Padres for Wade LeBlanc. Baker served as backup to Nick Hundley and Yasmani Grandal in 2012, starting 52 games and batting .238 while throwing out 16% of base runners. In 2013, he began the year as the backup to Hundley. He started 12 games for the Padres in April and May, and then was optioned to the Triple-A Tucson Padres when Grandal returned from his 50-game suspension. He was designated for assignment on June 10, 2013.

=== Los Angeles Dodgers ===
On June 15, 2013, Baker was claimed off waivers by the Los Angeles Dodgers he was then optioned to AAA Albuquerque. He was outrighted off the 40 man roster on August 5. In 40 games with the Isotopes, he hit .203. He became a free agent on October 1.

=== Chicago Cubs ===
On December 13, 2013, Baker signed a minor league deal with an invitation to spring training with the Chicago Cubs. Baker won the backup catcher job out of spring training when George Kottaras was released. On July 29, 2014, Baker pitched a scoreless top of the 16th inning with a popout and double play, as the Cubs had exhausted their bullpen in a game against the Colorado Rockies. In the bottom half of the inning, he walked from a full count, then reached third with the bases loaded and one out. He scored the winning run on a lineout by Starlin Castro, earning him the win in the longest game, by time, in Cubs history. Baker became the fourth position player to earn a win since 1968, and first since Chris Davis did so in 2012. John is the only Cubs position player to ever be credited with a pitching win in the history of the franchise.

=== Seattle Mariners ===
On January 29, 2015, Baker signed a minor league contract with the Seattle Mariners. He was released on May 20, 2015.

== Coaching career ==
Baker joined the Chicago Cubs in 2015 as a special assistant with the baseball operations department. In his time with the Cubs, he spent time as the mental skills coordinator and head applied mental skills coach. On November 10, 2020, it was announced that the Pittsburgh Pirates had hired Baker as the director of coaching and player development.

== Personal life ==
During the offseason, Baker has taught Physical Education at St. Isidore School in Danville, California, where his wife, Meghan, used to teach.

Baker enjoys broadcasting. He had a stint as a co-host with Rick Tittle on the Sports Byline USA radio network.

Baker is a philanthropist who was nominated for the Roberto Clemente Award. He visited the troops in the Middle East and helped victims of the earthquake in Haiti.

After leaving Berkeley to begin his baseball career, Baker chose to not finish his degree at Berkeley, ultimately completing an online Bachelor's through Arizona State.
