= Brad Brach =

American baseball player (born 1986)

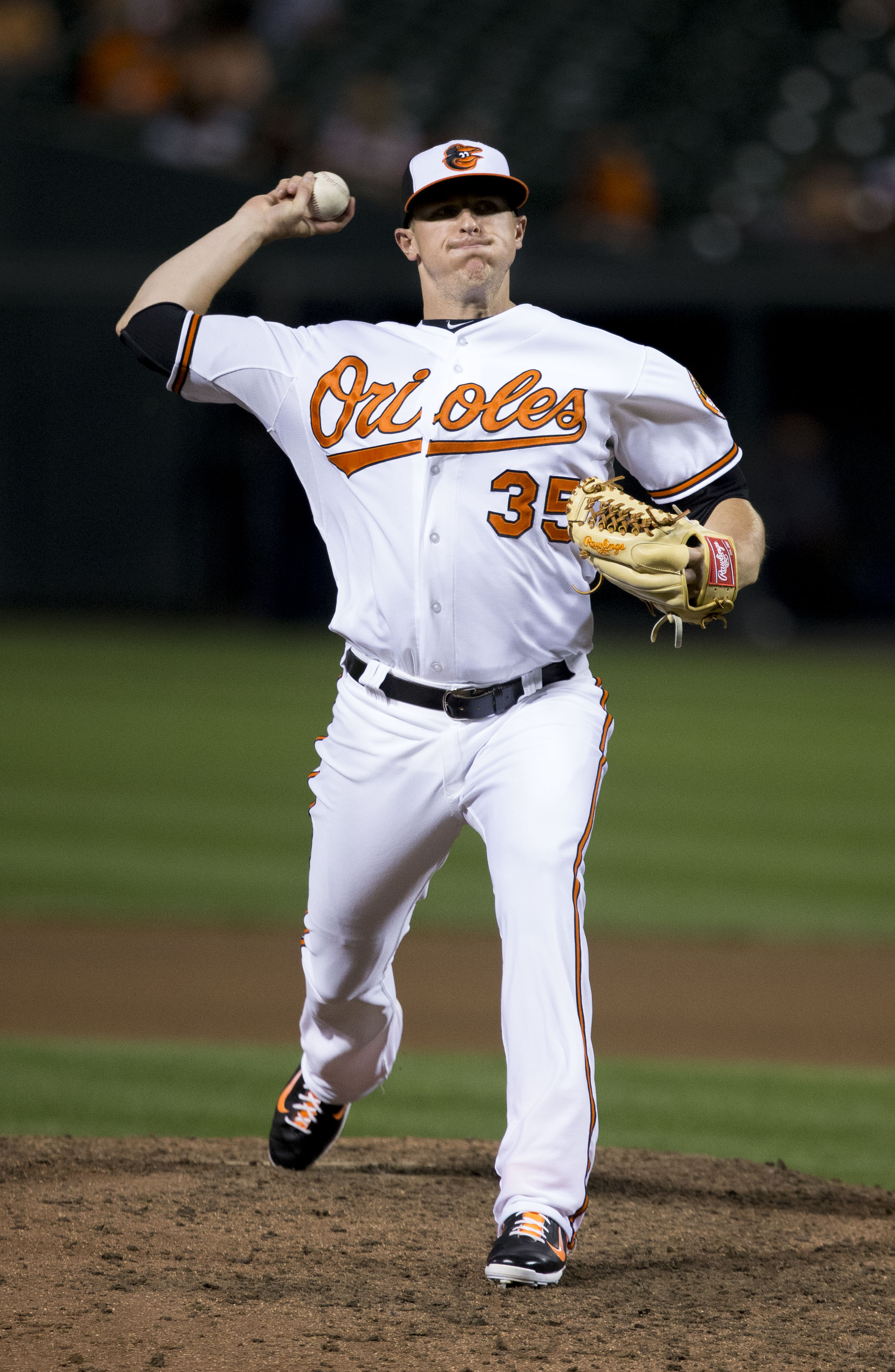
- Brach with the Baltimore Orioles in 2014
- Pitcher
- Born: April 12, 1986 (age 40); Freehold Township, New Jersey, U.S.
- Batted: Right Threw: Right

MLB debut
- August 31, 2011, for the San Diego Padres

Last appearance
- September 8, 2021, for the Cincinnati Reds

MLB statistics
- Win–loss record: 38–29
- Earned run average: 3.55
- Strikeouts: 589
- Stats at Baseball Reference

Teams
- San Diego Padres (2011–2013); Baltimore Orioles (2014–2018); Atlanta Braves (2018); Chicago Cubs (2019); New York Mets (2019–2020); Cincinnati Reds (2021)

Career highlights and awards
- All-Star (2016)

Brad Brach (/brɑːk/ BRAHK; born April 12, 1986) is an American former professional baseball pitcher. He played in Major League Baseball (MLB) for the San Diego Padres, Baltimore Orioles, Atlanta Braves, Chicago Cubs, New York Mets, and Cincinnati Reds. Brach was an All-Star in 2016.

== Amateur career ==
Brach grew up in Freehold Township, New Jersey, where he attended Freehold Township High School. Brach grew up a New York Mets fan. He enrolled at Monmouth University and played college baseball as a starting pitcher for the Monmouth Hawks through his senior year. In 2007, he played collegiate summer baseball with the Cotuit Kettleers of the Cape Cod Baseball League. As of 2011 he still held the school record for career wins and strikeouts. In 2016, he was inducted into Monmouth's athletics hall of fame.

== Professional career ==
=== San Diego Padres ===
The San Diego Padres selected Brach in the 42nd round of the 2008 Major League Baseball draft; he was signed by the Padres' Northeast Scouting Director, Jim Bretz. Brach spent 2009 with the Class-A Fort Wayne TinCaps and 2010 with the Class-A Advanced Lake Elsinore Storm pitching in relief. He was named the California League's Pitcher of the Year for 2010 after posting a 2.47 ERA and saving a league record 41 games in 62 appearances. Brach began 2011 with the Double-A San Antonio Missions and was promoted to the Triple-A Tucson Padres in July. Between the two clubs he posted a 2.89 ERA and 94 strikeouts in 71 2/3 innings.

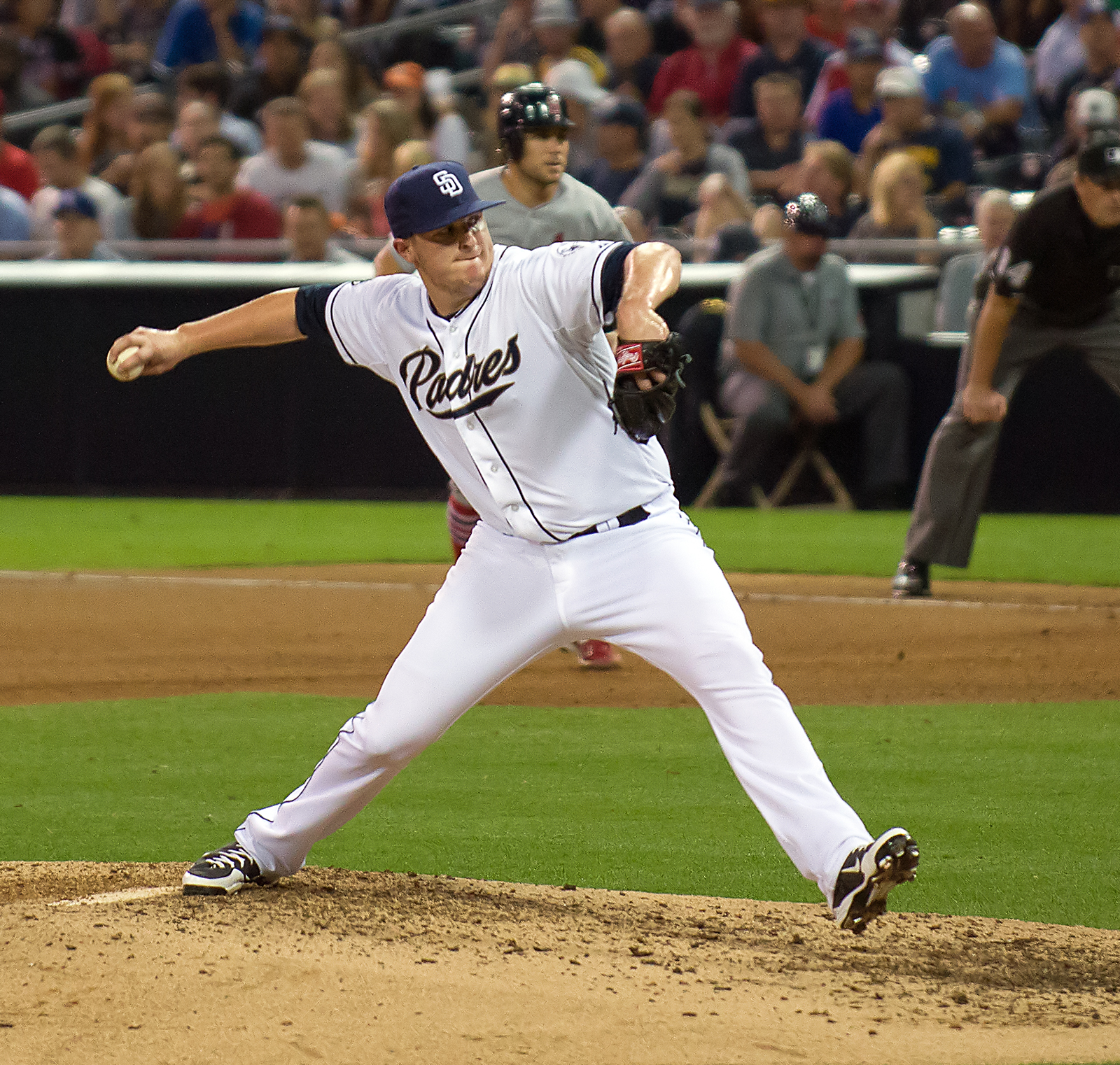
Brach pitching for the San Diego Padres in 2012

Brach was called up to the Major Leagues for the first time on August 31, 2011, working 1 1/3 innings against the Los Angeles Dodgers. He stayed with the Padres through September, appearing in eight more games and finishing with a 5.14 ERA and 11 strikeouts.

Brach made the Padres' 2012 Opening Day roster, replacing an injured Tim Stauffer. He was optioned to Triple-A Tucson on April 16 after five relief appearances, but was recalled on May 4. He was optioned to Tucson again on June 28 to make room on the roster when Andrew Cashner returned as a starter, but was recalled on July 4 when Cashner was placed on the disabled list. Brach remained with the Padres through the rest of 2012, posting a 3.78 ERA in 67 total appearances and striking out 75 against 33 walks in 66 2/3 innings.

Brach was designated for assignment by the Padres on November 20, 2013.

=== Baltimore Orioles ===
On November 25, 2013, Brach was traded to the Baltimore Orioles, in exchange for minor league RHP Devin Jones.

Brach had a solid year in his first season with the Orioles, as he appeared in 46 regular season games with a 3.18 ERA. He struck out 54 batters, having a 7.8 K/9 ratio. Brach recorded his first ever win in the MLB Playoffs on October 3, 2014, against the Detroit Tigers. In 2015, Brach appeared in 62 games out of the bullpen, throwing 79 1/3 innings, pitching to a 2.72 ERA and a 5–3 record. He held opponents to a .203 average and had 10.1 K/9.

In 2016, Brach was named to his first career All-Star game, along with fellow Orioles pitcher, Zach Britton. (Manny Machado, Matt Wieters, and Mark Trumbo were also selected from the Orioles). Through the first half of the 2016 campaign, Brach posted a 6–1 record, 0.91 ERA and a 0.83 WHIP to accompany 58 strikeouts and 15 walks in 49 1/3 innings. He led all Major League relievers in WAR at the break. Despite struggling in the second half, Brach finished the season making 71 appearances, throwing 79 innings, striking out a career-high 92 batters while picking up a career-high ten wins, 24 Holds, two saves and pitched to a 2.05 ERA. He tossed 1 1/3 innings and struck out two batters in the Orioles Wild Card game loss.

Brach opened the 2017 as the Orioles eighth inning, setup man. He assumed the role of closer early on in the season after teammate Zach Britton was placed on the DL. On April 19, 20 & 21, Brach earned saves in consecutive games. He became the fourth pitcher in Orioles history to record perfect saves in three consecutive days. On the season, Brach ended with a 3.18 ERA in 67 games while recording 18 saves. The following season, he assumed the closer role while Britton recovered from an offseason injury. Brach struggled through the first half, posting an ERA of 4.85 in 42 games with 11 saves.

=== Atlanta Braves (first stint) ===
On July 29, 2018, Brach was traded to the Atlanta Braves in exchange for international signing bonus slot money. Down the stretch, Brach owned an ERA of 1.52 in 27 appearances for the Braves. He elected free agency on October 29.

=== Chicago Cubs ===
On February 11, 2019, Brach signed a one-year, $3 million deal with the Chicago Cubs. The deal included a mutual option for 2020. He struggled through inconsistency and control through 42 games, posting a career worst 6.13 ERA while walking batters at a 6.4 rate which was a career high. On August 3, 2019, the Cubs designated him for assignment. On August 6, 2019, the Cubs officially released Brach.

=== New York Mets ===
On August 8, 2019, Brach signed with the New York Mets. He finished the 2019 season going 1–1 with a 3.68 ERA over 14.2 innings for the Mets. Brach re-signed on a one-year contract with the Mets worth $850,000 with a player option for the 2021 season worth $1.25 million on December 6, 2019. Appearing in 15 contests for the Mets in 2020, Brach pitched to a 5.84 ERA with 14 strikeouts in 12.1 innings pitched. On October 31, 2020, Brach exercised his player option to remain with the Mets for the 2021 season. On February 11, 2021, Brach was designated for assignment by the Mets after the signing of Jonathan Villar was made official. On February 16, Brach was released by the Mets.

=== Kansas City Royals ===
On February 22, 2021, Brach signed a minor league contract with the Kansas City Royals organization that included an invitation to Spring Training. On April 23, 2021, Brach was selected to the 40-man roster. He was designated for assignment the next day without making an appearance for the club. On April 26, Brach elected free agency.

=== Cincinnati Reds ===
On May 1, 2021, Brach signed a minor league contract with the Cincinnati Reds organization. On May 21, Brach was selected to the active roster. On September 14, the Reds designated him for assignment. On September 17, the Reds released Brach.

=== Atlanta Braves (second stint) ===
On March 19, 2022, Brach signed a minor league deal with the Braves. He was released on November 8.

== Post-playing career ==
On June 30, 2023, Brach joined MASN as a part-time game analyst on Baltimore Orioles telecasts.

== Pitching style ==
Brach throws mostly two pitches: a four-seam fastball at 90-94 mph and a slider at 80–85. Occasionally, he adds a splitter to lefties.

== Personal life ==
Brach lives in Nashville, Tennessee, with his wife, singer-songwriter Jenae Cherry, who was raised in Wonder Lake, Illinois. The two married in November 2013. The couple's eldest daughter was born in December 2017. Their twin sons were born in July 2020. Brach's younger brother, Brett also pitched for Monmouth and was drafted by the Cleveland Indians in the 10th round of the 2009 Major League Baseball draft. He played minor league baseball until 2014, and retired from baseball in 2015, after playing in the Atlantic League.
