= Tucson, Arizona PCL Baseball Team =

Tucson Arizona has had several baseball teams in the minor league Pacific Coast League, including:

- Tucson Toros, 1969–1997
- Tucson Sidewinders, 1998–2008
- Tucson Padres, 2011–2012, planned to relocated to El Paso
