= Dale Thayer =

American baseball player (born 1980)

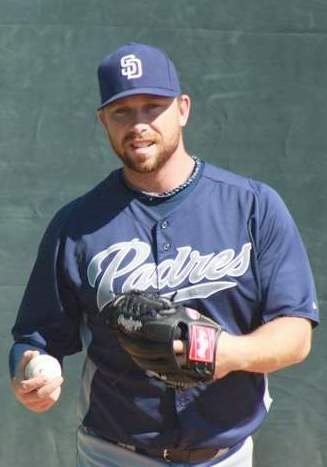
- Thayer with the San Diego Padres
- Relief pitcher
- Born: December 17, 1980 (age 45); Fountain Valley, California, U.S.
- Batted: Right Threw: Right

MLB debut
- May 22, 2009, for the Tampa Bay Rays

Last MLB appearance
- August 10, 2015, for the San Diego Padres

MLB statistics
- Win–loss record: 11–17
- Earned run average: 3.47
- Strikeouts: 213
- Stats at Baseball Reference

Teams
- Tampa Bay Rays (2009–2010); New York Mets (2011); San Diego Padres (2012–2015)

Dale Scott Thayer (born December 17, 1980) is an American former professional baseball pitcher. He played in Major League Baseball (MLB) for the Tampa Bay Rays, New York Mets, and San Diego Padres.

== Playing career ==
=== Draft ===
Thayer was drafted out of high school by the Chicago Cubs in the 47th round of the 1999 Major League Baseball draft, but did not sign. Thayer went undrafted out of Chico State in 2002, but was signed as a free agent by the San Diego Padres on September 25, 2002.

=== San Diego Padres minor league system ===
Thayer was used as a closer for the majority of his minor league career. In 2003, Thayer had 25 saves and a 2.06 ERA with the Class A Fort Wayne Wizards of the Midwest League. He began 2004 with the High-A Lake Elsinore Storm, where he had a 1.63 ERA and 23 saves, and was promoted to the Double-A Mobile BayBears in August. Thayer spent all of 2005 with Mobile, posting a 2.34 ERA and 27 saves in 56 games with 9.2 strike-outs per 9 innings. In 2006, he again spent the year with Mobile except for two appearances with Triple-A Portland in September. He had a 2.48 ERA and 27 saves in 57 games with Mobile.

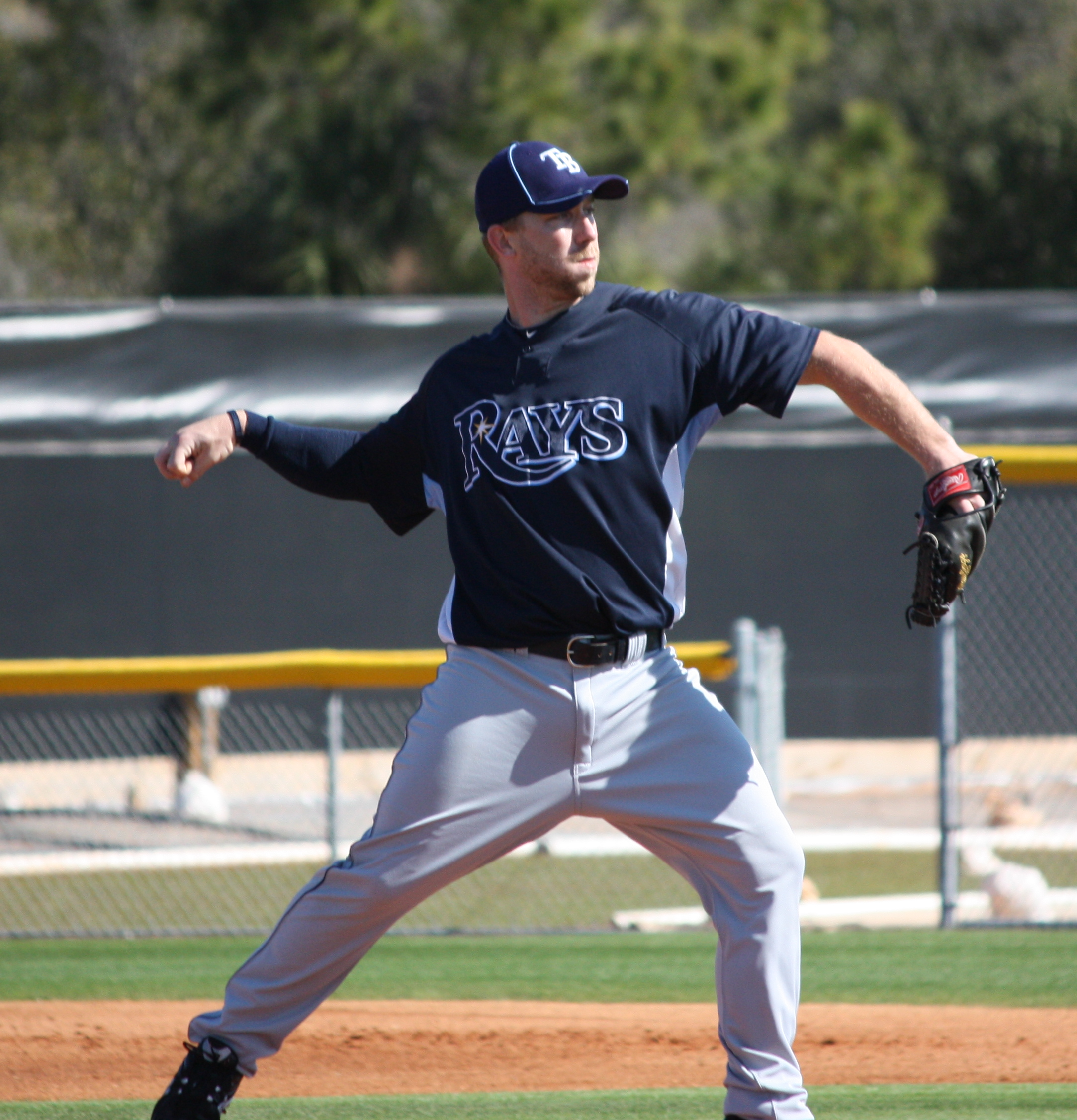
Thayer with the Rays in 2010 spring training.

=== Tampa Bay Rays ===
Thayer was traded to the Tampa Bay Rays on September 15, 2006, as a player to be named later in exchange for Russell Branyan. He started 2007 with the Double-A Montgomery Biscuits and was advanced to the Triple-A Durham Bulls in August. He had a 2.35 ERA in 55 combined games for the year, finishing 47 of them. Thayer spent all of 2008 with the Bulls and pitched to a 2.77 ERA with 72 strike-outs in 68 1/3 innings and 9 saves in 52 games. Thayer again started 2009 in Triple-A Durham but made his Major League debut on May 22, 2009, at Land Shark Stadium in Miami Gardens against the Florida Marlins. He pitched 3 innings, allowing one earned run and collected his first Major League save. Thayer had 3 stints with the Rays in 2009, including a September call-up. He pitched in 11 games with the Rays, giving up 7 earned runs in 13 2/3 innings. At the Triple-A level in 2009, he posted a 2.27 ERA with 17 saves in 51 games. Thayer spent most of 2010 with Durham, where he had a 3.45 ERA in 46 games with 55 strike-outs in 60 innings. He was moved up to the majors on August 6, 2010, to add bullpen depth, but only pitched in a single game with the Rays before being sent back down. He was granted free agency at the end of the season.

=== New York Mets ===
The New York Mets signed Thayer to a minor league contract in the off-season. He was assigned to the Triple-A Buffalo Bisons, where he had a 2.66 ERA in 54 games on the year, earning 21 saves. The Mets purchased Thayer's contract on May 27, 2011. As part of the move, the Mets brought up Ángel Pagán and sent down Fernando Martínez and Pat Misch. Thayer was sent down to the minors on June 11 after pitching in 4 games, as D. J. Carrasco was brought back up after being demoted in April. Thayer was recalled in September and pitched in 7 more games for the Mets. Overall, he had a 3.48 ERA in 10 1/3 innings. He declared for free agency on October 23.

=== San Diego Padres ===
Thayer signed a minor league contract with the San Diego Padres on December 6, 2011. He also received an invitation to spring training. On April 26, 2012, Thayer was called up from Triple-A Tucson to replace Huston Street, who was placed on the 15-day DL, having gone 0-0 with a 0.00 ERA in 8.1 innings at Tucson. In his first full season with a major league team, Thayer had a 2-2 record with a 3.43 ERA and seven saves. In 2013, Thayer opened the season in the Padres bullpen. He finished with a record of 3-5 in 69 games. The following season, Thayer enjoyed his best season of his career, pitching a career high 70 games with a career low 2.34 ERA. Thayer was designated for assignment on August 11, 2015. He ended the season with a 4.06 ERA in 38 games.

=== Baltimore Orioles ===
Thayer signed a minor league deal with the Baltimore Orioles in February 2016. In March he opted out the contract, making him a free agent.

=== Los Angeles Dodgers ===
On April 2, 2016, Thayer signed a minor league deal with the Los Angeles Dodgers. He pitched in seven games for the Double-A Tulsa Drillers before he was released on May 3.

=== Atlanta Braves ===
On May 30, 2016, Thayer signed a minor league contract with the Atlanta Braves. He was assigned to the Triple-A Gwinnett Braves. Thayer was released on June 11.
