= Tommy Layne =

American baseball player (born 1984)

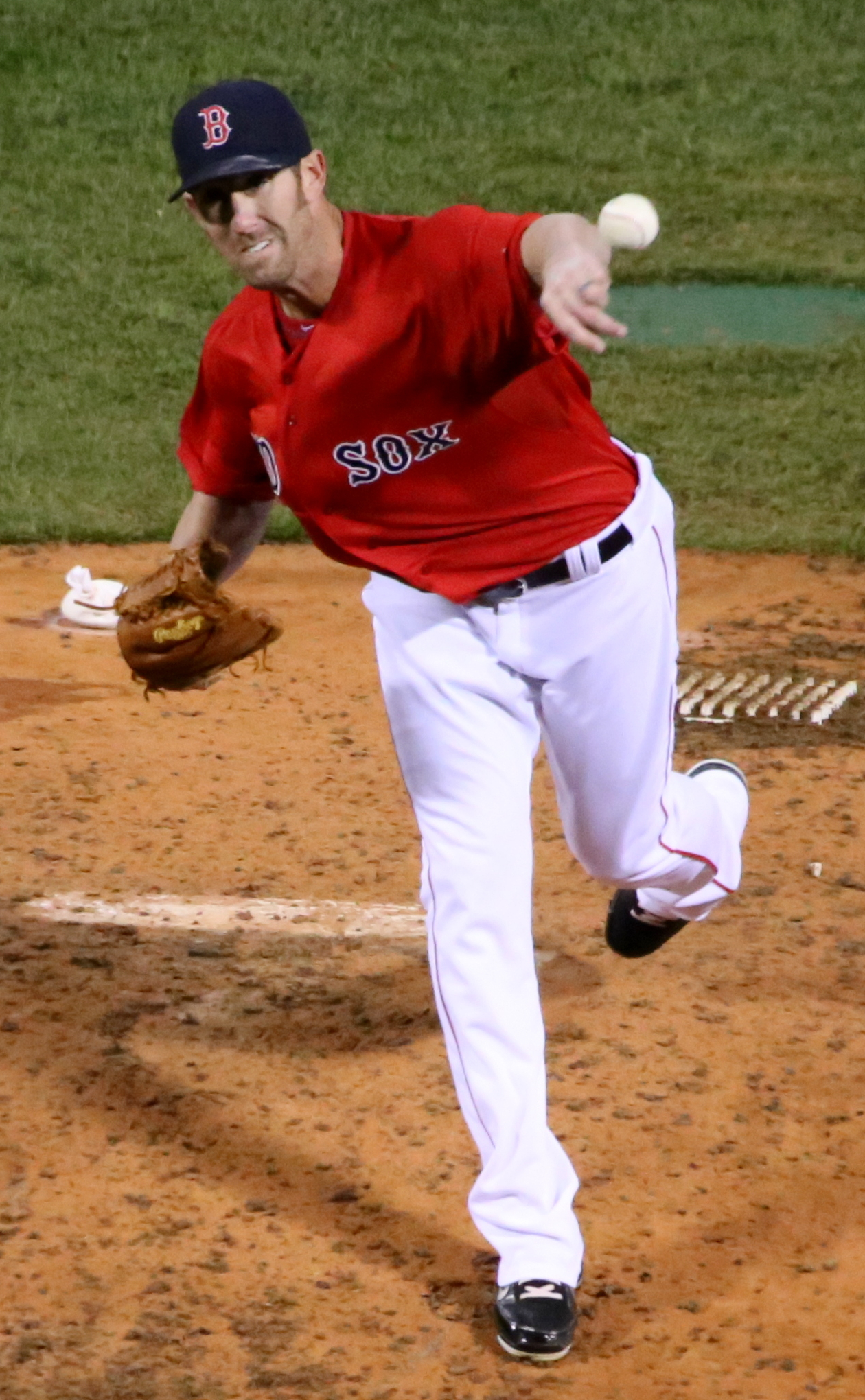
- Layne pitching for the Red Sox in 2015
- Pitcher
- Born: November 2, 1984 (age 41); St. Louis, Missouri, U.S.
- Batted: Left Threw: Left

MLB debut
- August 14, 2012, for the San Diego Padres

Last MLB appearance
- June 10, 2017, for the New York Yankees

MLB statistics
- Win–loss record: 8–5
- Earned run average: 3.61
- Strikeouts: 137
- Stats at Baseball Reference

Teams
- San Diego Padres (2012–2013); Boston Red Sox (2014–2016); New York Yankees (2016–2017)

Thomas Kevin Layne (born November 2, 1984) is an American former professional baseball pitcher. He played in Major League Baseball (MLB) for the San Diego Padres, Boston Red Sox, and New York Yankees.

== Amateur career ==
Layne attended Fort Zumwalt South High School in St. Peters, Missouri, where he played baseball and soccer. He then enrolled at Southwestern Illinois College where he played college baseball for two years. He then played at the University of Central Missouri for one year, before transferring to Mount Olive College in Mount Olive, North Carolina, where he played for the Mount Olive Trojans. In 2007, Layne was named an All-American and Carolinas-Virginia Athletic Conference Baseball Pitcher of the Year.

== Professional career ==
=== Arizona Diamondbacks ===
The Arizona Diamondbacks drafted Layne in the 26th round of the 2007 MLB draft. Layne progressed steadily up the minor league ladder over five seasons in the Diamondbacks' system and was promoted to the Triple-A Reno Aces in early 2011. Over three seasons, Layne had posted a 3.82 earned run average (ERA) working exclusively as a starter in Double-A for the Diamondbacks, but struggled in his time at Triple-A, accumulating a 6.21 ERA in 15 games started and 17 relief appearances in 2011.

=== San Diego Padres ===
The San Diego Padres acquired Layne from the Diamondbacks on May 3, 2012, for cash considerations. Layne made 5 starts and notched a 7.77 ERA for the Triple-A Tucson Padres before he was demoted to the Double-A San Antonio Missions and began working out of the bullpen. Layne was noted as having a "rubber arm" and he enjoyed having the chance to pitch every day, so he welcomed the transition to a reliever role. Layne had more success at Double-A, posting a 3.28 ERA and 36 strikeouts in 35 2/3 innings.

The Padres promoted Layne to the major leagues on August 14. Layne made his Major League debut the same night against the Atlanta Braves, striking out the side in his one inning. Layne remained with the Padres for the rest of 2012, working out of the bullpen. He didn't allow a run in his first 11 appearances. Layne earned his first win as a Major Leaguer on September 4 when he struck out Adrián González, Matt Kemp, and Hanley Ramírez in order in the 10th inning. Layne finished the season with a 3.24 ERA and 25 strike-outs versus 3 walks in 16 2/3 innings over 26 appearances. Layne was designated for assignment on October 25, 2013.

=== Boston Red Sox ===
Layne signed a minor league deal with the Boston Red Sox on November 10, 2013. He was called up for the night game of a day-night doubleheader against the Baltimore Orioles on July 5, 2014. After the game, he was optioned to the Triple A Pawtucket Red Sox. As a result of a number of trades at the 2014 trade deadline, Layne was recalled to the Boston Red Sox.

In 2016, Layne pitched to a 3.77 ERA in 34 games for the Red Sox. After they acquired Fernando Abad at the trade deadline, the Red Sox designated Layne for assignment on August 2 and released him on August 6.

=== New York Yankees ===
The New York Yankees signed Layne on August 9, 2016.

Layne made 19 appearances for the Yankees in 2017, struggling to a 7.62 ERA with 9 strikeouts across 13 innings pitched. He was designated for assignment by New York on June 10, 2017. Layne cleared waivers and was sent outright to the Triple-A Scranton/Wilkes-Barre RailRiders on June 13. He was released by the Yankees organization on July 4.

=== Los Angeles Dodgers ===
Layne signed a minor league contract with the Los Angeles Dodgers on July 19, 2017, and was assigned to the Triple-A Oklahoma City Dodgers. He pitched in three games for them and was released by the Dodgers organization on July 31.

=== Boston Red Sox (second stint) ===
Layne signed a minor league contract to return to the Boston Red Sox on February 24, 2018. He was released on May 18, after failing to make an appearance in a game due to recovery from an injury.

=== St. Louis Cardinals ===
On June 15, 2018, Layne signed a minor league contract with the St. Louis Cardinals. He spent the remainder of the year with the Triple–A Memphis Redbirds, also appearing in two games for the Double–A Springfield Cardinals. In 27 appearances for Memphis, Layne recorded a 1.35 ERA with 34 strikeouts and 3 saves across 26 2/3 innings pitched. He elected free agency following the season on November 2.

Layne re–signed with the Cardinals on a minor league contract on November 6, 2018. Layne was released by the organization on July 3, 2019.

== Personal life ==
Layne is the youngest of four brothers. He currently resides in Rye, New York.
