= Brent Mayne =

American baseball player (born 1968)

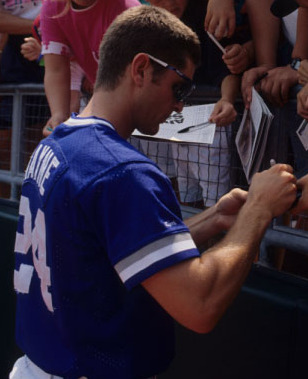
- Mayne with the Kansas City Royals in 1992
- Catcher
- Born: April 19, 1968 (age 58); Loma Linda, California, U.S.
- Batted: Left Threw: Right

MLB debut
- September 18, 1990, for the Kansas City Royals

Last MLB appearance
- October 2, 2004, for the Los Angeles Dodgers

MLB statistics
- Batting average: .263
- Home runs: 38
- Runs batted in: 403
- Stats at Baseball Reference

Teams
- Kansas City Royals (1990–1995); New York Mets (1996); Oakland Athletics (1997); San Francisco Giants (1998–1999); Colorado Rockies (2000–2001); Kansas City Royals (2001–2003); Arizona Diamondbacks (2004); Los Angeles Dodgers (2004)

Brent Danem Mayne (born April 19, 1968) is an American former professional baseball catcher. He played 15 seasons in Major League Baseball (MLB) from 1990 to 2004 for the Kansas City Royals, New York Mets, Oakland Athletics, San Francisco Giants, Colorado Rockies, Arizona Diamondbacks, and Los Angeles Dodgers.

== Career ==
Mayne attended Costa Mesa High School, in Costa Mesa, California, Orange Coast College and Cal State Fullerton. He was an All-American with the Cal State Fullerton Titans.

The Kansas City Royals selected Mayne in the first round, with the 13th overall selection, of the 1989 Major League Baseball (MLB) Draft. As a Royal, Mayne caught Bret Saberhagen's no-hitter on August 26, 1991.

On May 28, 1998, the San Francisco Giants were playing the Arizona Diamondbacks. With the bases loaded and the Diamondbacks leading 8-6 with 2 outs in the bottom of the 9th inning, Barry Bonds came to the plate with the bases loaded. Diamondbacks manager Buck Showalter ordered Bonds intentionally walked. Bonds's walk drove in the run. Mayne then came to the plate with the tying run on third base and winning run in scoring position, and lined out to right field to end the game.

On August 22, 2000, the Colorado Rockies sent Mayne in as a relief pitcher in the 12th inning against the Atlanta Braves. Mayne, the Rockies' regular catcher, was unable to swing a bat due to a sprained left wrist and had missed the previous four games. Out of pitchers, manager Buddy Bell asked Mayne if he could pitch. Mayne, who later said he had never pitched at any level, responded, "Yeah, I can pitch." He pitched one inning, surrendering no runs with a fastball that topped out at 83 miles per hour. Colorado won the game in the bottom of the 12th inning when rookie Adam Melhuse, pinch-hitting for Mayne, singled with the bases loaded and two outs. Mayne became the first position player pitcher to be credited with a win since Rocky Colavito in 1968, and the last to do so until Wilson Valdez in 2011.

In a 15-year career, Mayne was a .263 hitter with 38 home runs and 403 RBI in 1279 games.

Mayne was inducted into the Orange Coast College Hall of Fame in 2006 and into the Cal State Fullerton Hall of Fame in 2011.
