= Pitching by position players =

Occurrence within the game of baseball

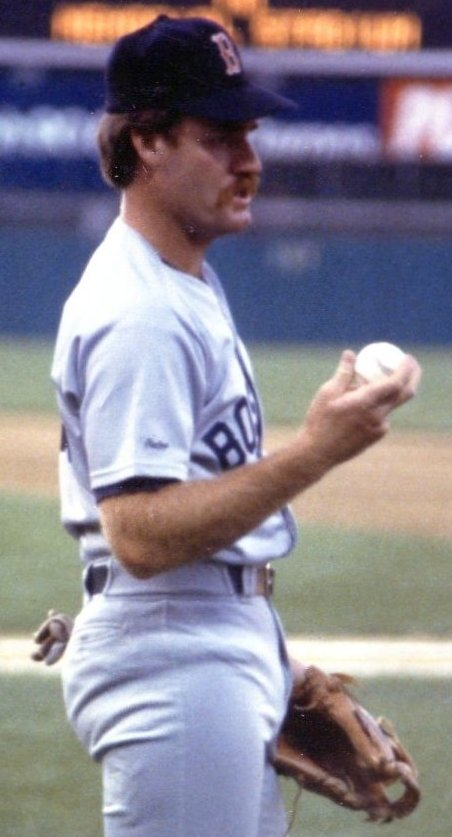
Wade Boggs, who played in 2440 Major League Baseball games and was elected to the National Baseball Hall of Fame as a third baseman, made two pitching appearances during his major-league career.

In baseball, pitching by position players refers to the act of a position player (a player who is normally a catcher, an infielder, an outfielder, or, in this context, a designated hitter) being used as a pitcher. A position player typically pitches when a game has a lopsided score or when the game has gone so far into extra innings that no other pitchers are available. The term is not used for a two-way player, a baseball player who is skilled at pitching and who plays another position. (Note: Notable examples of a two-way player include Babe Ruth, Bullet Rogan, and Shohei Ohtani.)

Although it was extremely rare for position players to pitch prior to the mid-2010's, pitching by position players has now become relatively common in Major League Baseball, particularly in blowout games. This has led to rules being implemented to limit the use of position players as pitchers.

== Usage ==
In the very early days of Major League Baseball (MLB), before substitutions were generally allowed, pitching by a position player was often the only way to relieve a pitcher who was tiring: the pitcher and a position player would switch positions, but neither would leave the game entirely. For example, on July 22, 1884, manager Frank Bancroft of the Providence Greys wanted to relieve Charlie Sweeney after seven innings because the latter was allegedly drunk. This could only be done by asking Sweeney to switch positions with right fielder Cyclone Miller. Sweeney refused and left the team entirely.

However, for most of the history of MLB, position players have rarely been called on to pitch. From 1950 through 1999, it happened a total of 574 times, an average of slightly less than 12 times a season, typically late in blowouts.

Exceptions include the earliest years of the modern baseball era (it happened 236 times from 1901 through 1903) and during the player shortage of World War II (e.g. 71 times during 1942). From 1930 through 1937, it happened six times or less each season, and from 1965 through 1986, it happened eight times or less each season. There have been multiple seasons with no recorded instances, most recently in 2006, and multiple seasons with only a single instance, most recently in 2005. Since 2014, however, it has happened at least 23 times each season, including 90 times in 2019 and 112 times in 2021.

Major League Baseball does not use run differential as a tiebreaker in its team standings. Thus, once a team is trailing by a large margin, there is no meaningful additional consequence to a team's season if it concedes additional runs, including by using inexperienced pitchers. Using a position player as a pitcher is meant to save relief pitchers for more competitive games. However, it also risks injury to position players who are unfamiliar with pitching, although position players generally mitigate the risk by focusing on maintaining control as opposed to velocity. In 1993, Jose Canseco of the Texas Rangers pitched one inning against the Boston Red Sox, conceding two hits, three walks, and three earned runs before injuring his arm; the resulting Tommy John surgery ended his season.

=== Restrictions ===
MLB announced a new collective bargaining agreement (CBA) with the Major League Baseball Players Association (MLBPA) in 2019, intended to be effective in the 2020 season, that included restrictions on position players pitching. Each team designates players as either "position players" or "pitchers" before the start of the season, and that designation cannot be changed during the season. Under the 2019 agreement, only players who were designated as pitchers were allowed to pitch in any regular-season or postseason game, with three exceptions: either team was ahead by 6 or more runs, the game was in extra innings, or a player had earned the status of "two-way player" per the MLB definition.

Due to the impact of the COVID-19 pandemic on baseball, MLB did not implement the restriction during the shortened 2020 season. It was also waived for all of the 2021 season, and for part of the 2022 season.

Starting in the 2023 Major League Baseball season, position players are restricted to pitch only in situations where their team is leading by 10 or more runs in the 9th inning, their team is losing by 8 or more runs at any time, or the game is in extra innings. When MLB added the Automated Ball-Strike System (ABS) in the 2026 season, it forbade ABS challenges while a position player is pitching.

== Examples in MLB ==
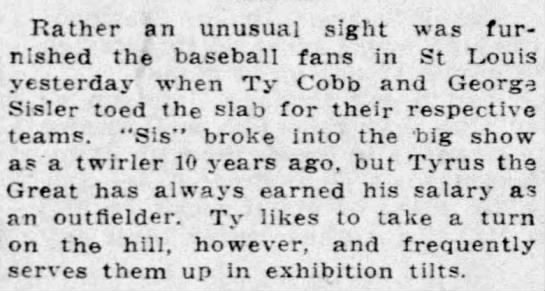
Newspaper report of Ty Cobb's pitching appearance in October 1925

Historical examples of Baseball Hall of Fame position players pitching in MLB games include Ty Cobb (four innings in 1918 and one inning in 1925), Jimmie Foxx (one inning in 1939), (Note: During 1945, with a reduced number of players available due to World War II and in the final season of his career, Foxx pitched in nine games, including two starts.) Stan Musial (to a single batter in 1952), Tris Speaker (one inning in 1914), and Ted Williams (two innings in 1940). Cobb's appearance in 1925 occurred on the final day of the regular season, with the game having no bearing on the final order of teams in league standings. Cobb pitched the bottom of the eighth inning in an 11–6 win for his Detroit Tigers over the St. Louis Browns. It was the second game of a doubleheader, and the game was then called on account of darkness before the ninth inning began. Under statistical rules that were adopted in 1969 and retroactively applied to earlier seasons, Cobb has been credited with a save. Musial's pitching appearance also came on the final day of the regular season, in 1952. With his St. Louis Cardinals hosting the Chicago Cubs, Musial started the game in center field, and pitched only to the second batter of the game, Frank Baumholtz—Musial and Baumholtz were competing for the league's batting title. Baumholtz, normally a left-handed batter, batted right-handed against Musial; Baumholtz reached base on an error, and Musial then returned to his original position. The Cubs went on to win the game, 3–0, while Musial won the batting title, .326 vs. .325 for Baumholtz.

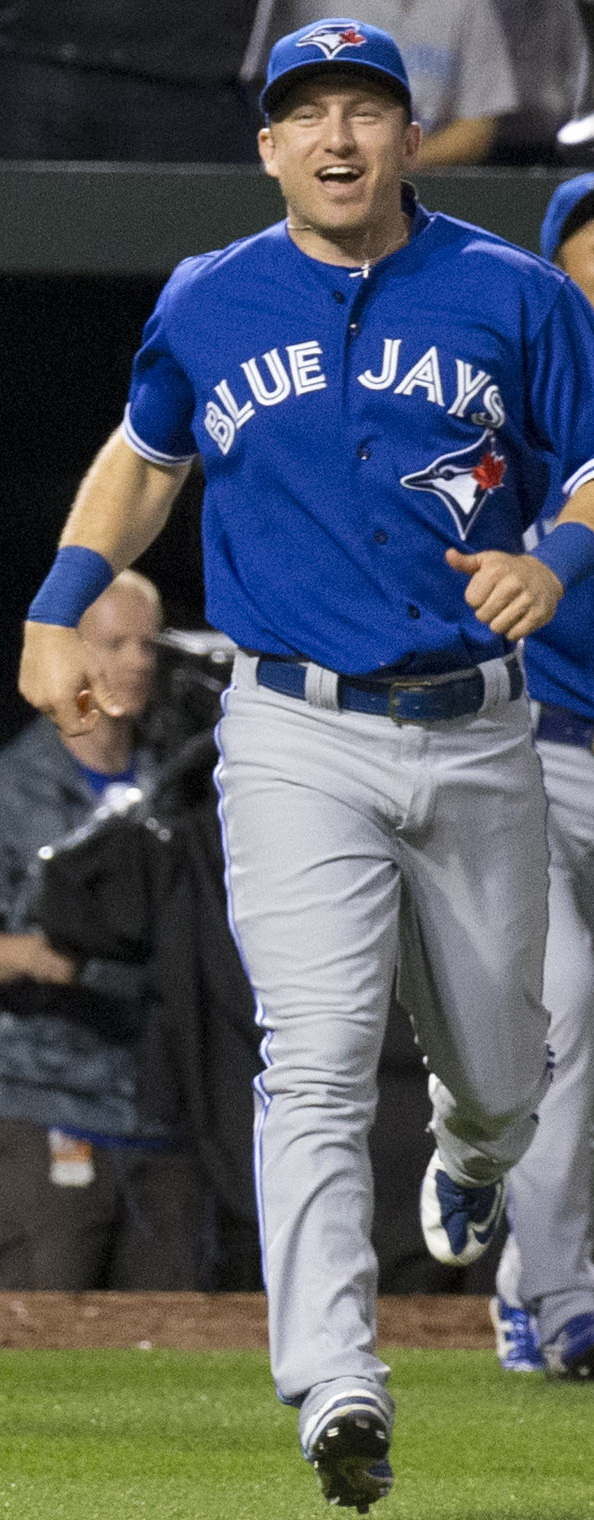
The first position player to pitch in the MLB postseason was Cliff Pennington in 2015.

Several position players have pitched in the context of another baseball anomaly—playing all nine defensive positions in a single game. These players include Bert Campaneris (September 8, 1965), César Tovar (September 22, 1968), Scott Sheldon (September 6, 2000), Shane Halter (October 1, 2000), and Andrew Romine (September 30, 2017).

Cliff Pennington of the Toronto Blue Jays, who pitched one-third of an inning in Game 4 of the 2015 American League Championship Series en route to a 14–2 loss, was the first position player to pitch during the MLB postseason. The only other position player to pitch in the postseason is Austin Romine of the New York Yankees, who pitched the ninth inning of Game 3 in a 16–1 loss against the Boston Red Sox in the 2018 American League Division Series.

There has not been an instance of a position player pitching in an MLB All-Star Game, although two-way player Shohei Ohtani began the 2021 edition as both the starting pitcher and designated hitter for the American League.

During a 19-inning game between the Blue Jays and Cleveland Indians in 2016, Toronto used two position player pitchers, Ryan Goins and Darwin Barney. Goins told the Blue Jays' trainers that he felt something abnormal in his forearm after pitching the 18th inning, so the team had Barney relieve him in the 19th. "It's unfortunate, but sometimes you have to do it," said Toronto manager John Gibbons about his decision to use two position players instead of starting pitchers in relief, as the Indians had done. "That’s just the way it goes sometimes."

It is rare for a position player pitcher to earn a win or loss decision for his appearance. During the 19-inning Toronto–Cleveland game in 2016, Darwin Barney was the losing pitcher. The only MLB game in which both pitchers of record were position players occurred in 2012, when the Baltimore Orioles' designated hitter Chris Davis won a 16-inning game against Boston while Red Sox outfielder Darnell McDonald took the loss. Six position player pitchers have earned a win since 1961: Rocky Colavito in 1968, Brent Mayne in 2000, Wilson Valdez in 2011, Davis in 2012, John Baker in 2014, and Luis Torrens in 2022.

== Examples in Negro leagues ==
Historical examples of Baseball Hall of Fame position players pitching in games of the Negro Major Leagues include catcher Josh Gibson (1 2/3 innings in 1935), infielder Judy Johnson (4 1/3 innings in 1926), and infielder Willie Wells (two-thirds of an inning in 1945). (Note: Negro leagues data is not complete.)

== Pitchers playing at a position ==
Managers have also used the reverse strategy, a pitcher (other than a two-way player) playing at a fielding position, usually in the outfield. In 1983, the New York Yankees were forced to complete the infamous Pine Tar Game against the Kansas City Royals, after the Royals successfully protested the original ending to the game. Manager Billy Martin, in an informal protest of his own, played several players out of position, including pitcher Ron Guidry in center field. Joe Maddon, who at the time was managing the Cubs, gained attention in 2016 for playing three different pitchers in left field in a 15-inning game at the Cincinnati Reds. This is the only time that such a move has ever happened in the modern era of MLB. Maddon's move was motivated by a lack of available position players, but given its success, he told reporters that he was considering making such a move during a nine-inning game.

The strategy can also be used to switch between two pitchers without removing a pitcher from the game. On August 31, 1968, Pittsburgh Pirates pitcher Steve Blass started a game, recorded the first out, then moved to left field to allow Elroy Face to make one final appearance with the team before being traded, tying Walter Johnson for the most pitching appearances with one team. After Face retired Félix Millán, the only batter he faced, Blass returned to the mound and pitched the final 8 1/3 innings. In August 1979, Pittsburgh Pirates reliever Kent Tekulve entered a game in San Francisco and recorded the first two outs of the ninth inning. To remain in the game, he moved to left field to allow left-handed reliever Grant Jackson to face Darrell Evans, a lefty hitter. Evans flied out to Tekulve, ending the game. Davey Johnson, manager of the New York Mets, used left-handed pitcher Jesse Orosco and right-hander Roger McDowell alternatively as a pitcher and as an outfielder against the Reds in a 1986 game. Lou Piniella, as Cubs manager, also used this strategy with Sean Marshall and Aaron Heilman in 2009. Piniella's strategy worked, and earned praise from his opponent, Cardinals manager Tony LaRussa. Managers are restricted by MLB rule 5.10(d), a comment to which states, "A pitcher may change to another position only once during the same inning."

Managers are normally reluctant to play pitchers in the outfield due to their unfamiliarity with the position and due to the risk of injury, although some pitchers have displayed good skill in the field. Maddon denied that the injury risk would deter him from shuffling pitchers and outfielders, telling reporters, "Everybody's afraid of injury all the time. God, man, drive a car in Manhattan — you want to be afraid of injury, just walk down the street." In 2016, Cubs relief pitcher Travis Wood, playing left field in the seventh inning against the Seattle Mariners, made a difficult catch to rob an extra-base hit from Franklin Gutierrez. In 2019, pitcher Vince Velasquez of the Philadelphia Phillies threw out a runner at home plate and made a diving catch while playing left field as outfielder Roman Quinn pitched in the last two innings of a 15-inning game against the Chicago White Sox..
