= Andy Parrino =

American baseball player (born 1985)

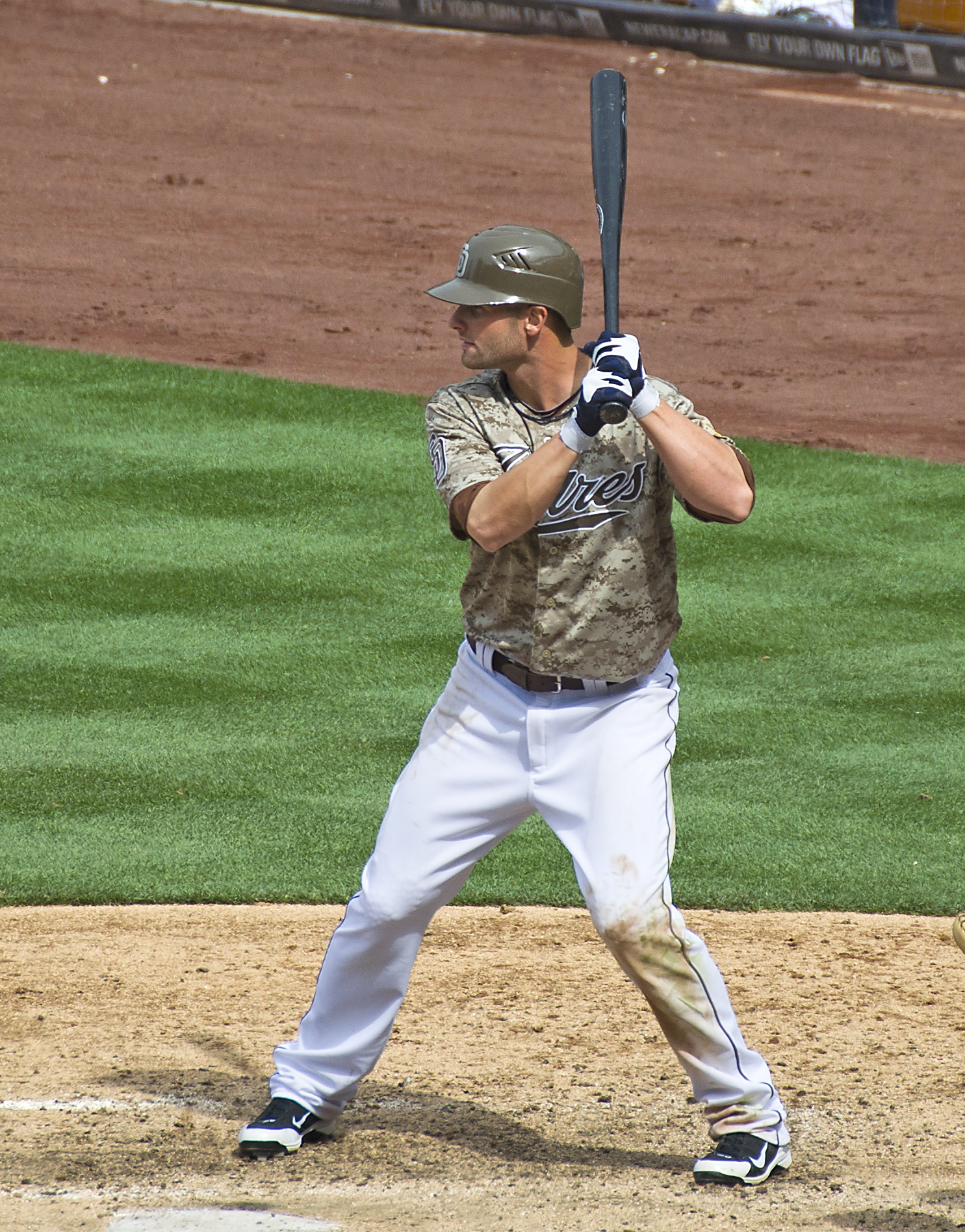
- Parrino with the San Diego Padres
- Shortstop / Second baseman
- Born: October 31, 1985 (age 39); Brockport, New York, U.S.
- Batted: Switch Threw: Right

MLB debut
- August 26, 2011, for the San Diego Padres

Last MLB appearance
- June 17, 2015, for the Oakland Athletics

MLB statistics
- Batting average: .175
- Home runs: 2
- Runs batted in: 14
- Stats at Baseball Reference

Teams
- San Diego Padres (2011–2012); Oakland Athletics (2013–2015)
Medals
Men's baseball
Representing United States
Pan American Games
Silver medal – second place	2015 Toronto	Team

Andrew Barker Parrino (born October 31, 1985) is an American former professional baseball infielder. He played in Major League Baseball (MLB) for the San Diego Padres and Oakland Athletics.

== College ==
Parrino has origin from Sicily, Italy. Parrino played three years of college baseball at Le Moyne College in Syracuse, New York. He was named the Metro Atlantic Athletic Conference Player of the Year in 2007. He was only the second position player to make it to MLB out of Le Moyne.

== Professional career ==
=== San Diego Padres ===
Parrino was drafted by the Padres in the 26th round of the 2007 MLB draft and signed by the team's Northeast Scouting Director, Jim Bretz. He was promoted to the Padres on August 26, 2011, to make his MLB debut. He played in 24 games in 2011, playing third, shortstop, second, and the outfield. Parrino collected 8 hits in 44 at-bats.

Parrino opened 2012 as the Padres' utility infielder, edging out Everth Cabrera in spring training. He made 24 starts at shortstop (18), second (5), and third (1) before being placed on the disabled list June 3 with a sprained right wrist. Parrino spent July and August with the Triple-A Tucson Padres, batting .328 in 65 games. He was recalled from Triple-A on September 5 and finished out the season with 7 more starts in 15 games played, picking up 8 hits in 24 at-bats. For the season, he totaled a .207 batting average with a .316 on-base percentage.

=== Oakland Athletics ===
Parrino was traded to the Oakland Athletics on November 16, 2012, with Andrew Werner for Tyson Ross and A.J. Kirby-Jones.

At the end of 2013 spring training, Oakland optioned him to Triple-A Sacramento. On April 10, 2013, Parrino was recalled by Oakland to replace the injured Scott Sizemore.

On February 27, 2014, Parrino was designated for assignment by the Athletics. The Texas Rangers claimed him on March 3. He was claimed off waivers by the Athletics on April 21, 2014. Parrino was recalled to the Athletics on August 15, after an injury to starting shortstop Jed Lowrie.

On January 10, 2015, Parrino was designated for assignment. On May 22, Athletics purchased his contract from Triple-A Nashville. He played 17 games for the Athletics before being returned to Nashville, where he played the rest of the season. He elected to become a free agent at the season's end.

=== Chicago White Sox ===
On December 4, 2015, Parrino signed a minor league contract with the Chicago White Sox organization. In 52 games for the Triple–A Charlotte Knights, he batted .213/.270/.276 with one home run and 19 RBI. Parrino elected free agency following the season on November 7, 2016.
