= Andrew Werner =

American baseball player (born 1987)

- Pitcher
- Born: February 25, 1987 (age 38); Peoria, Illinois, U.S.
- Batted: Left Threw: Left

MLB debut
- August 22, 2012, for the San Diego Padres

Last appearance
- October 3, 2012, for the San Diego Padres

MLB statistics
- Win–loss record: 2–3
- Earned run average: 5.58
- Strikeouts: 35
- Stats at Baseball Reference

Teams
- San Diego Padres (2012)

Andrew Steven Werner (born February 25, 1987) is an American former professional baseball pitcher and former college baseball coach. He played college baseball at Illinois Central College in 2006 and 2007 before transferring to the University of Indianapolis in 2008 and 2009. He played in Major League Baseball (MLB) with the San Diego Padres in 2012. He was the pitching coach at Bradley University, and previously coached at Young Harris College and University of South Carolina Aiken.

== High School and College ==
Werner graduated from Washington Community High School in 2005. He attended Illinois Central College in 2006 and 2007. He pitched for the University of Indianapolis in 2008 and 2009. On May 16, 2009, in his final game for the University of Indianapolis, Werner struck out 11 University of Southern Indiana batters in relief.

== Professional career ==
=== Independent Leagues ===
Undrafted, in 2009 Werner pitched for the Evansville Otters of the independent Frontier League. In 2010, Werner worked as the pitching coach for Eureka College, and then pitched for the Otters and the Windy City ThunderBolts, also of the Frontier League.

=== San Diego Padres ===
Werner was signed by the San Diego Padres as an undrafted free agent after the 2010 season. In 2011, Werner pitched for the Fort Wayne TinCaps and the Lake Elsinore Storm. In 2012, he pitched for the San Antonio Missions and the Tucson Padres before being called up to the majors for the first time on August 22, 2012. He started in eight games for the Padres.

=== Oakland Athletics ===
On November 16, 2012, Werner was traded to the Oakland Athletics with Andy Parrino in exchange for Tyson Ross and A.J. Kirby-Jones.

On December 4, 2013, Werner was designated for assignment by Oakland, to clear room on the 40-man roster for recently signed pitcher Scott Kazmir. Werner cleared waivers and was outrighted to the Triple-A Sacramento River Cats on December 12.

=== Ottawa Champions ===
Werner signed to play with the Ottawa Champions in the Canadian American Association of Professional Baseball in 2015. He made 22 appearances (21 starts) for Ottawa during the year, logging a 12-8 record and 3.36 ERA with 86 strikeouts across 144 2/3 innings pitched. Werner became a free agent after the season.

== Coaching career ==
Werner began his coaching career as the head assistant coach at Illinois Central College. In 2017, Werner was the pitching coach at USC Aiken. The following year he was named the pitching coach at Young Harris. On August 16, 2019, Werner was named the pitching coach at Bradley, serving through the 2025 season.

== Personal life ==
Werner married his wife, Melanie, in February 2012.
