= Alí Solís =

Mexican baseball player (born 1987)

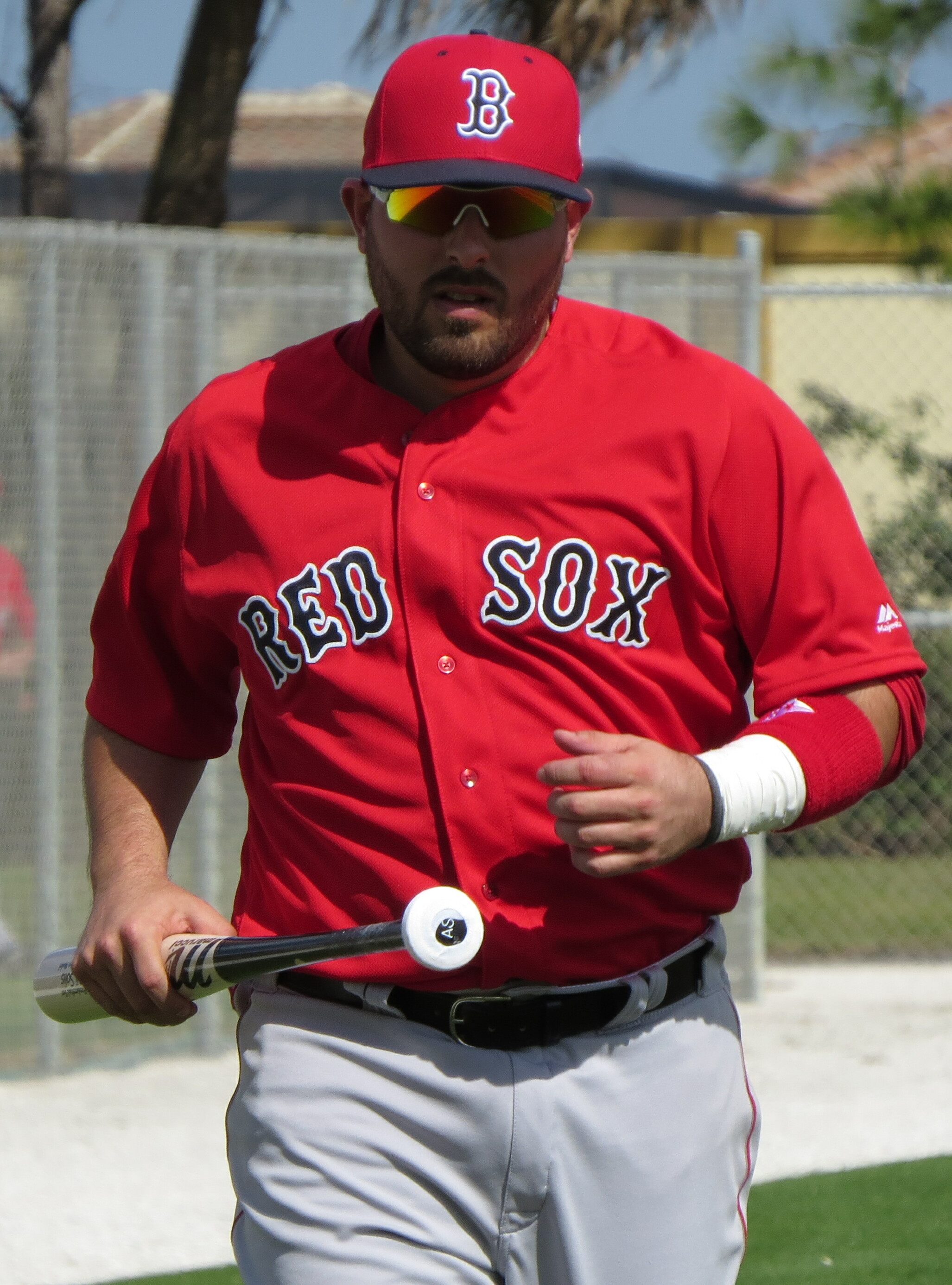
- Solís with the Boston Red Sox

Toros de Tijuana – No. 4
- Catcher
- Born: September 29, 1987 (age 39); Mexicali, Mexico
- Bats: Right Throws: Right

MLB debut
- September 16, 2012, for the San Diego Padres

MLB statistics (through 2014 season)
- Batting average: .000
- Home runs: 0
- Runs batted in: 1
- Stats at Baseball Reference

Teams
- San Diego Padres (2012); Tampa Bay Rays (2014)
Medals
Men's baseball
Representing Mexico
2019 WBSC Premier12
Bronze medal – third place	2019 Tokyo	National team

Román Alí Solís López (born September 29, 1987) is a Mexican professional baseball catcher for Toros de Tijuana of the Mexican League and Tomateros de Culiacán of the Mexican Pacific League. He has previously played in Major League Baseball (MLB) for the San Diego Padres in 2012 and Tampa Bay Rays in 2014.

== Professional career ==
=== San Diego Padres ===
The San Diego Padres signed Solís as an international free agent in February 2005. Solís spent eight professional seasons in the Padres minor league organization, as well as playing 21 games in the Mexican League in 2010.

In 2012, Solís played for the Double-A San Antonio Missions, hitting .283 with 6 home runs in 87 games. He appeared in the All-Star Futures Game as a replacement for Yasmani Grandal. He was voted the top catcher, along with Lars Davis, in the Texas League.

The Padres promoted Solís to the major leagues on September 4, 2012. He appeared in 5 games and had 4 at-bats, staying on the roster through the end of the season.

=== Pittsburgh Pirates ===
On October 25, 2012, the Pittsburgh Pirates claimed Solís off waivers and then outrighted him to the minors.

=== Tampa Bay Rays ===
Solis signed a minor league deal with the Tampa Bay Rays on November 21, 2013. His contract was selected from the Triple-A Durham Bulls on May 27, 2014, and for the Rays he was hitless in six at-bats.

=== Los Angeles Dodgers ===
On December 19, 2014, Solís signed a minor league contract with the Los Angeles Dodgers that included an invitation to Major League spring training. Solís left the team on February 21, 2015, due to a "contractual issue". On March 16, he rejoined the Dodgers but was assigned to minor league camp. Solís was assigned to the Double-A Tulsa Drillers to start the season. He played in 69 games for Tulsa and hit .145/.175/.195 in 220 at-bats before a late season recall to the Triple-A Oklahoma City Dodgers, where he hit .143 in 14 at-bats in seven games.

=== Boston Red Sox ===
On December 15, 2015, Solís signed a minor league contract with the Boston Red Sox. He split the 2016 season between the Double-A Portland Sea Dogs and the Triple-A Pawtucket Red Sox, slashing a cumulative .192/.236/.273 in 33 games for the two affiliates. On November 7, 2016, Solís elected free agency.

=== Chicago Cubs ===
On January 10, 2017, Solís signed a minor league contract with the Chicago Cubs. He was invited to Spring Training for the 2018 season but did not make the team and was assigned to the Triple-A Iowa Cubs.

=== Sultanes de Monterrey ===
On August 7, 2018, Solís was loaned to the Sultanes de Monterrey of the Mexican League. With them in 2018 he batted .366/.400/.521 in 71 at bats. Solís did not play in a game in 2020 due to the cancellation of the Mexican League season because of the COVID-19 pandemic.

In 2023, Solís played in 63 games for Monterrey, hitting .184/.207/.274 with 3 home runs and 21 RBI.

=== Conspiradores de Querétaro ===
On February 26, 2024, Solís was loaned to the Conspiradores de Querétaro of the Mexican League. In 38 appearances for Querétaro, he slashed .256/.310/.496 with eight home runs and 25 RBI.

=== Toros de Tijuana ===
On February 5, 2025, Solís was traded to the Toros de Tijuana. In 38 appearances for Tijuana, Solis batted .204/.267/.269 with no home runs and 12 RBI.

=== El Águila de Veracruz ===
On February 4, 2026, Solís was loaned to the El Águila de Veracruz of the Mexican League. In 30 appearances for Veracruz, he batted .149/.197/.149 with no home runs and two RBI.

=== Toros de Tijuana (second stint) ===
On June 12, 2026, Solís was returned to the Toros de Tijuana of the Mexican League.

== International career ==
He played for the Mexico national baseball team at the 2013 World Baseball Classic and in 2019 exhibition games against Japan.
