= Tucson Padres =

- 2011–2013; Tucson, Arizona

Minor league affiliations
- Class: Triple-A (2011–2013)
- League: Pacific Coast League (2011–2013)
- Conference: Pacific Conference
- Division: Southern Division

Major league affiliations
- Team: San Diego Padres (2011–2013)

Minor league titles
- League titles: none
- Division titles: none

Team data
- Name: Tucson Padres (2011–2013)
- Ballpark: Kino Veterans Memorial Stadium (2011–2013)

The Tucson Padres were a Minor League Baseball team based in Tucson, Arizona, that competed in the Pacific Coast League (PCL). They were the Triple-A affiliate for the San Diego Padres. The team moved to Tucson from Portland, Oregon, for the 2011 season. In April 2014, the team moved to El Paso, Texas, and changed their name to the El Paso Chihuahuas.

== Franchise history ==
Following the 2010 season, the Portland Beavers were put up for sale after PGE Park (now Providence Park) was remodeled into a soccer-only configuration for the MLS's 2011 expansion Portland Timbers. In 2010, the Beavers were sold to Jeff Moorad, principal owner of the San Diego Padres.

=== The Move to Tucson ===
On October 19, 2010, it was announced a site in Escondido, California had been selected for the new home of the Portland Beavers. The new ballpark was scheduled to open in April 2013. Until the move to Escondido could be completed the Padres would play their home games at Kino Veterans Memorial Stadium in Tucson, Arizona. In May 2011, citing reasons of proposed redevelopment revenue confiscation by the State, the ballpark plans in Escondido were placed on indefinite hold.

=== Franchise sale ===
Following the California Supreme Court's decision to uphold the 2011 decision by the State to abolish redevelopment agencies it was decided by the Mayor of Escondido, Sam Abed, the city would not be able to build the proposed stadium. In reaction Jeff Moorad announced he would sell the team if a location within the San Diego area could not be found. No sites materialized and in December 2011, Moorad decided to place the Tucson Padres up for sale. By December 2011, Moorad had received offers from buyers in three cities outside California. No offers surfaced to keep the team in Tucson. As a result, the Padres played in Tucson for the 2012 season and, in July 2012, announced they would remain in Tucson for the 2013 season as well.

=== Relocation to El Paso ===
On July 30, 2012, the Pacific Coast League gave preliminary approval to MountainStar Sports Group, an ownership group based out of El Paso, Texas, for the purchase of the Tucson Padres. The final sale of the Padres to MountainStar Sports was approved on September 26, 2012. On October 22, 2013 in front of a capacity crowd inside the historic Plaza Theater in Downtown El Paso, the MountainStar Sports Group announced that the team would officially be renamed as the El Paso Chihuahuas.
