= North Delta Blue Jays =

Canadian youth baseball team

Delta Blue Jays
- Founded: 1995
- League: B.C. Premier Baseball League
- Based in: Delta, British Columbia
- Ballpark: Mackie Park
- Colours: Blue, Red and White
- Manager: Gerry White
- Championships: 2 (2011, 2014 BCJPBL)

The Delta Blue Jays, are a Canadian youth baseball team located in the city of Delta, British Columbia. The team was founded in 1995, and joined the B.C. Premier Baseball League in 1999. The team plays their home games at Mackie Park.

Most of the Blue Jays are from either North Delta or Ladner, another community in Delta. Although they have never won a league championship, the Blue Jays have produced three Major League Baseball players in pitcher James Paxton (Seattle Mariners) Jeff Francis and 2006 American League MVP Justin Morneau.
