= Curtis Taylor (baseball) =

Canadian baseball player (born 1995)

NC Dinos – No. 66
- Pitcher
- Born: July 25, 1995 (age 31); Port Coquitlam, British Columbia, Canada
- Bats: Right Throws: Right

KBO debut
- March 29, 2026, for the NC Dinos

KBO statistics (through 2026 season)
- Win–loss record: 7–6
- Earned run average: 4.78
- Strikeouts: 95

Teams
- NC Dinos (2026–present)

Curtis Wesley Taylor (born July 25, 1995) is a Canadian professional baseball pitcher for the NC Dinos of the KBO League.

== Career ==
Taylor played youth baseball for the Coquitlam Reds of the British Columbia Premier Baseball League. He attended the University of British Columbia (UBC), where he played college baseball for the UBC Thunderbirds.

=== Arizona Diamondbacks ===
The Arizona Diamondbacks selected him in the fourth round, with the 119th overall selection, of the 2016 Major League Baseball draft. Taylor made his professional debut with the Low-A Hillsboro Hops, making 17 appearances and posting a 2.20 ERA. Taylor played for the Single-A Kane County Cougars in 2017, starting 13 games and registering a 3–4 record and 3.32 ERA with 68 strikeouts in 62 1/3 innings pitched.

=== Tampa Bay Rays ===
On November 30, 2017, the Diamondbacks traded Taylor to the Tampa Bay Rays for Brad Boxberger. Taylor split the 2018 season between the High-A Charlotte Stone Crabs and the Double-A Montgomery Biscuits, making 38 appearances and posting a 6–4 record and 2.54 ERA with 97 strikeouts and 8 saves in 78 innings pitched. The Rays invited Taylor to spring training as a non-roster player in 2019. He would play the entire season with Montgomery, making 15 appearances and recording a 3.06 ERA with 16 strikeouts and 7 saves in 17 2/3 innings of work.

=== Toronto Blue Jays ===
On September 1, 2019, the Rays sent Taylor to the Toronto Blue Jays as a player to be named later in their earlier trade for Eric Sogard. Taylor did not play in a game in 2020 due to the cancellation of the minor league season because of the COVID-19 pandemic.

Taylor split the 2021 season between the Double-A New Hampshire Fisher Cats and the Triple-A Buffalo Bisons, pitching in 30 games and logging a cumulative 2–3 record and 5.71 ERA with 41 strikeouts in 34 2/3 innings pitched.

=== Washington Nationals ===
On December 8, 2021, the Washington Nationals selected Taylor in the minor league phase of the Rule 5 draft. In 2022, Taylor split the year between the High-A Wilmington Blue Rocks, Double-A Harrisburg Senators, and Triple-A Rochester Red Wings. In 34 combined appearances, he logged a 3.91 ERA with 52 strikeouts in 46.0 innings pitched. He elected free agency following the season on November 10, 2022.

=== Chicago Cubs ===
On January 31, 2023, Taylor signed a minor league contract with the Chicago Cubs organization. He made 3 appearances for the Triple-A Iowa Cubs, struggling to a 12.27 ERA with 7 strikeouts in 3 2/3 innings pitched. Taylor was released by the Cubs on April 29.

=== Minnesota Twins ===
On May 4, 2023, Taylor signed a minor league contract with the Minnesota Twins organization. He spent the remainder of the year with the Double–A Wichita Wind Surge, also appearing in one game for the Triple–A St. Paul Saints. In 31 games for Wichita, Taylor recorded a 3.98 ERA with 46 strikeouts across 43 innings pitched. He elected free agency following the season on November 6.

=== Algodoneros de Unión Laguna ===
On June 25, 2024, Taylor signed with the Algodoneros de Unión Laguna of the Mexican League. In 14 appearances for the Algodoneros, Taylor struggled to a 7.53 ERA with 9 strikeouts across 14 1/3 innings pitched.

=== St. Louis Cardinals ===
On February 10, 2025, Taylor signed a minor league contract with the St. Louis Cardinals. He made 31 appearances (24 starts) for the Triple-A Memphis Redbirds, compiling a 10–4 record and 3.21 ERA with 118 strikeouts and one save across 137 1/3 innings pitched. Taylor elected free agency following the season on November 6.

=== NC Dinos ===
On December 11, 2025, Taylor signed with the NC Dinos of the KBO League.

== International career ==
Taylor was named to the Canadian national baseball team for the 2023 World Baseball Classic.

== See also ==
- Rule 5 draft results
