= Eric Sogard =

American baseball player (born 1986)

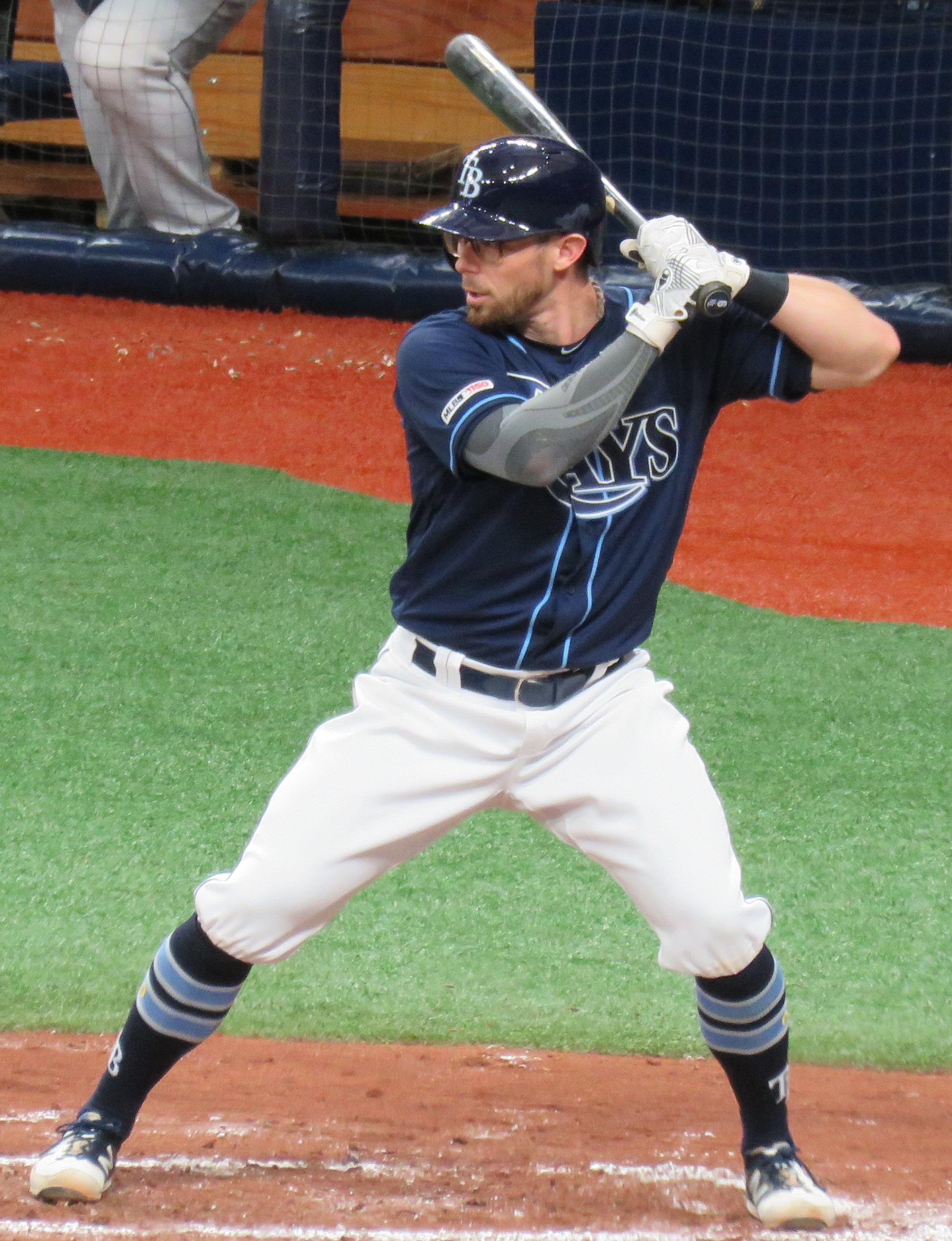
- Sogard batting for the Tampa Bay Rays in 2019
- Infielder
- Born: May 22, 1986 (age 40); Phoenix, Arizona, U.S.
- Batted: Left Threw: Right

MLB debut
- September 14, 2010, for the Oakland Athletics

Last MLB appearance
- July 21, 2021, for the Chicago Cubs

MLB statistics
- Batting average: .246
- Home runs: 26
- Runs batted in: 187
- Stats at Baseball Reference

Teams
- Oakland Athletics (2010–2015); Milwaukee Brewers (2017–2018); Toronto Blue Jays (2019); Tampa Bay Rays (2019); Milwaukee Brewers (2020); Chicago Cubs (2021)
Medals
Men's baseball
Representing Czech Republic
European Championship
| Bronze medal – third place | 2025 Rotterdam | Team |

Eric Sidney Sogard (born May 22, 1986) is an American former professional baseball infielder. He played in Major League Baseball (MLB) for the Oakland Athletics, Milwaukee Brewers, Toronto Blue Jays, Tampa Bay Rays, and Chicago Cubs.

Sogard attended Arizona State University and played college baseball for the Arizona State Sun Devils. In international competition, he represents the Czech Republic. His nickname "Nerd Power" was given to him by Athletics fans, who liked his play style and distinct glasses.

== Early life ==
Sogard's parents are Anna Vodicka Sogard and Bruce R. "Rudy" Sogard. Anna was born near Prague and moved to the United States with her family when she was 12 years old. Rudy was also a collegiate baseball player and set the home run record for DePauw University in 1975 while playing third base. Sogard is the brother of Alex Sogard.

== High school ==
Sogard attended Thunderbird High School in Phoenix. He played for the Chicago Cubs and Philadelphia Phillies scout teams in 2002 and 2003. He was the 2003 Arizona Republic's NW Valley H.S. Baseball Player of the Year, the Region Player of the Year, and 1st Team All-State shortstop. He repeated as All-State shortstop in 2004, and represented Arizona in the 2003 and 2004 Sunbelt Classic Baseball Series. Sogard broke numerous Thunderbird school batting records, including highest batting average, on-base percentage, and slugging percentage. In addition, Sogard was a star midfielder on Thunderbird's 2002 state runner-up (21–2) soccer team.

== College ==
Sogard received both academic and athletic scholarships from Arizona State University. He was ranked as the number 7 high school prospect in Arizona in 2004. He majored in kinesiology at ASU.

Sogard was a two-time All-American as a Sun Devil in 2006 and 2007, and was a 1st Team All-Pac-10 selection both years as well. He was also the 2007 Pac-10 Defensive Player of the Year. He played many positions in 2006 but stayed at second base for ASU in 2007. In 2006, Sogard had a slugging percentage of .625, third-best in the Pac-10, and an OPS of 1.057, fourth-best in the Pac-10. In 2007, he was second in the Pac-10 in average (.394) and runs (74), and third in walks (39) and on-base percentage (.488). In 2007, Sogard became one of only a few ASU players ever to hit .400 for an entire season, with at least 100 hits.

Sogard finished with the 15th-highest career batting average in ASU baseball history at .371. He is a member of the ASU All-Decade Team of 2000–09.

== Professional career ==
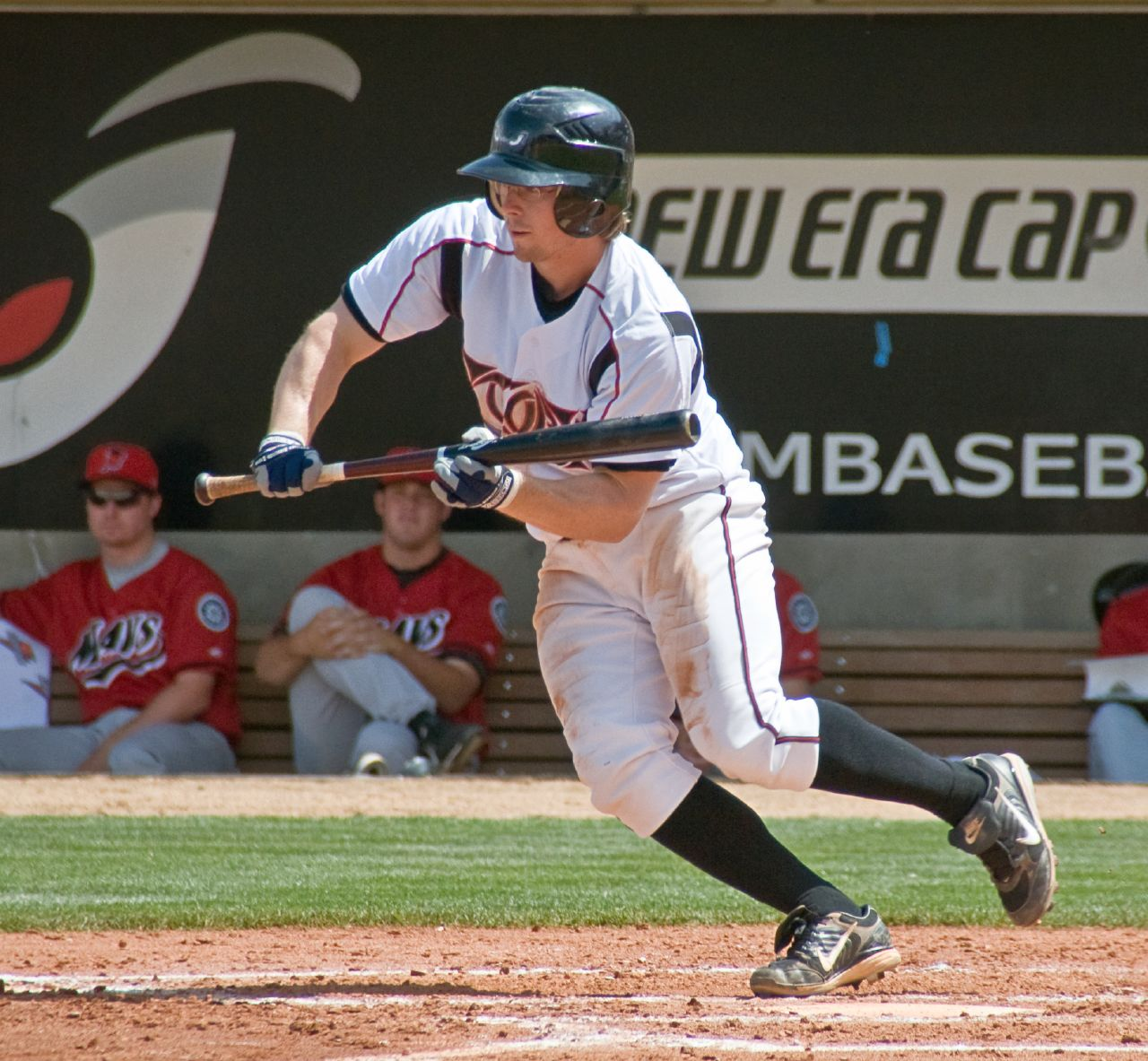
Sogard bunting for the Lake Elsinore Storm in 2008

=== San Diego Padres organization ===
Sogard was the first Sun Devil to be selected in the 2007 Major League draft, going in the second round, 81st overall, to the San Diego Padres. With Lake Elsinore in 2008, he led the California League in doubles (42) and on-base percentage (.394). He was a Baseball America High Class A All-Star, and a California League mid-season and post-season All-Star. He was also selected for the Topps' Class-A All-Star Team. In 2009, playing for the San Antonio Missions in AA, Scout.com ranked Sogard as one of the top hitting prospects in the Padres organization. He was named a Texas League mid-season All-Star at second base/designated hitter.

=== Oakland Athletics ===
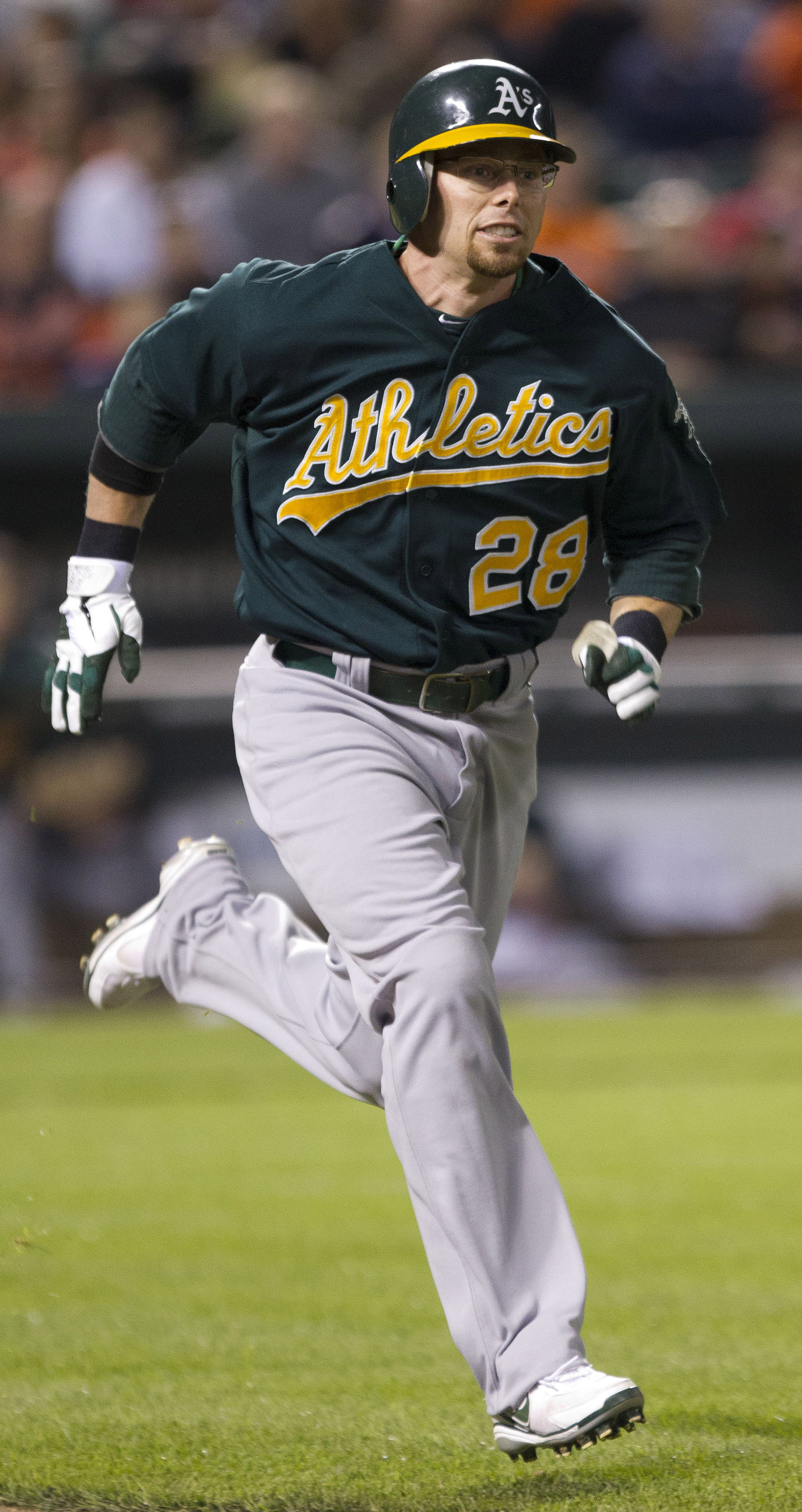
Sogard with the Oakland Athletics in 2012

On January 16, 2010, Sogard was traded along with Kevin Kouzmanoff to the Oakland Athletics in exchange for Scott Hairston and Aaron Cunningham. In 2010, he was an MiLB.com Organization All-Star with the Oakland organization. Sogard ended the 2010 season as one of Sacramento's more consistent players, earning a promotion to Oakland in September. In 2011, he was a Pacific Coast League mid-season All-Star at shortstop with Sacramento. He had the highest fielding percentage in the league. He spent the second half of the season with Oakland in the majors. On August 23, 2011, Sogard hit his first career home run off then-Yankees pitcher Bartolo Colón.

The A's entered spring training in the beginning of the 2013 season with a battle over the everyday second baseman job. Sogard was put into the competition along with Scott Sizemore, who was returning after missing the entire 2012 season, Jemile Weeks, Adam Rosales, Andy Parrino, and Jed Lowrie. Lowrie was first put into the competition and promised an everyday job but instead took over everyday shortstop due to the struggles and injury of Hiroyuki Nakajima. Sogard then won the second base battle as he was the opening day starting second baseman.

Sogard finished a close second in the contest, voted on by fans, to be named the "Face of MLB" in February 2014. Mets third baseman David Wright won.

In April 2016, Sogard underwent surgery on his left knee. He played in only two games for the Stockton Ports on rehab assignment. He was sent outright to Triple-A after the 2016 season and elected to become a free agent.

=== Milwaukee Brewers ===
On December 15, 2016, Sogard signed a minor league contract with the Milwaukee Brewers that included an invitation to spring training. In Sogard's first game with the Brewers, he hit a three-run home run. He finished the season playing in 94 games, establishing career highs in home runs (3), walks (45) and batting average (.273). The following season, Sogard played through injury, hitting a career worst .134 in 94 at bats. He was released by the team on July 10, 2018. He resigned a minor league deal on July 27, 2018. Sogard was released again by the Brewers on September 1, 2018.

=== Toronto Blue Jays ===
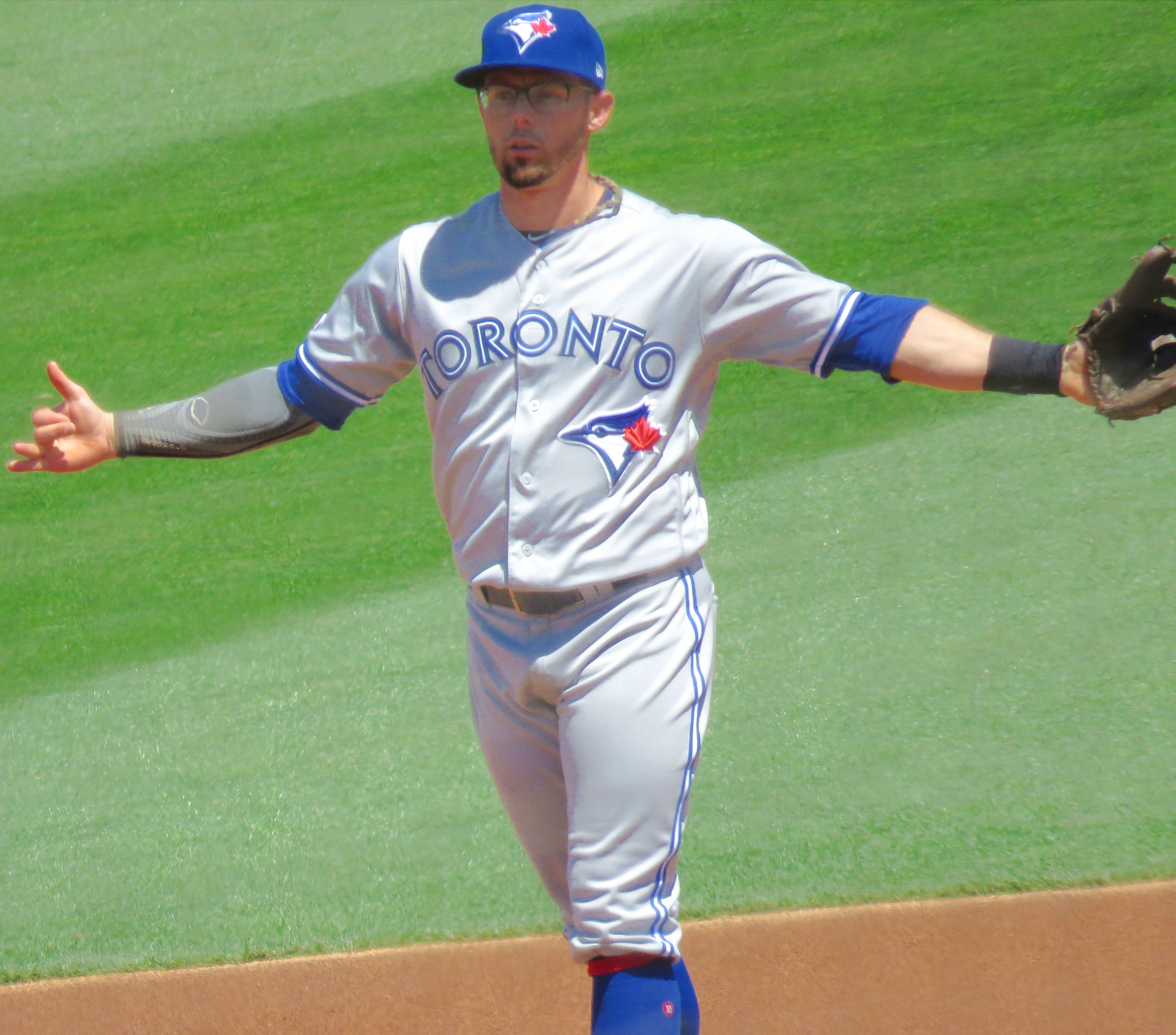
Sogard with the Toronto Blue Jays in 2019

On December 21, 2018, Sogard signed a minor league contract with the Toronto Blue Jays and was invited to spring training. He battled against Richard Ureña for the utility infielder spot on the opening day roster, but was ultimately sent to Triple-A affiliate Buffalo following the conclusion of spring training. Sogard had his contract selected on April 15, 2019. He made his debut with the team the next day, collecting three hits in a 6–5 win over the Minnesota Twins. Sogard saw success during his stint with the Blue Jays, hitting .300 and recording an OPS of .840 in 73 games.

=== Tampa Bay Rays ===
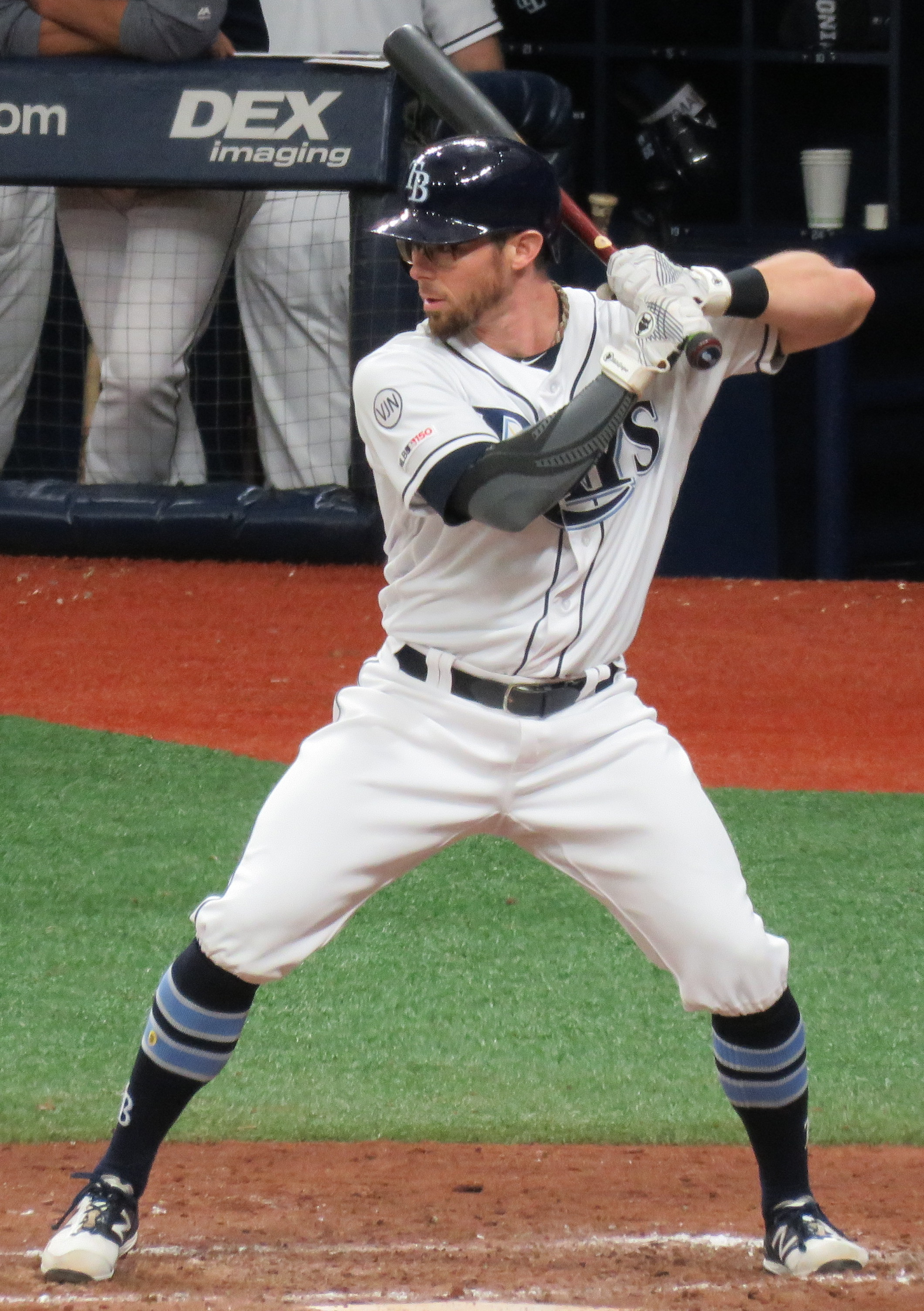
Sogard batting for the Tampa Bay Rays in 2019

On July 28, 2019, the Blue Jays traded Sogard to the Rays for two players to be named later. The PTBNL were later named as Edisson Gonzalez and Curtis Taylor. He hit .266 in 37 games.

=== Return to Milwaukee ===
On December 20, 2019, Sogard signed a one-year deal with the Milwaukee Brewers reuniting with his former team. Sogard hit his first career walk-off against the Pittsburgh Pirates on August 29, 2020 with a two-run home run in the ninth inning, resulting in a 7–6 victory for the Brewers. He finished the shortened season hitting .209/.281/.278 with 10 RBIs and 10 runs scored in 43 games.

=== Chicago Cubs ===
On March 3, 2021, Sogard signed a minor league contract with the Chicago Cubs organization that included an invitation to Spring Training. On March 28, 2021, Sogard was selected to the 40-man roster. Although a position player, Sogard recorded 5 pitching appearances in 2021, including 3 in a 10 game losing streak. In 78 games with the Cubs, Sogard hit .249/.283/.314 with 1 home run and 12 RBI. He was designated for assignment by the Cubs on July 23. He was released by the Cubs on July 28.

== International career ==
Sogard acquired citizenship in the Czech Republic in February 2022, making him eligible to play for the country's national team. He was announced as a player on the Czech Republic national baseball team’s roster for the 2023 World Baseball Classic. He was the only player on the team with MLB experience. He slashed .438/.438/.438 over 16 plate appearances during the tournament, leading the team in hits (7) and batting average.

== Personal life ==
Sogard's younger brother, Alex, is a former professional baseball player, who is now the head baseball coach at Wright State University.

Sogard married his wife Kaycee in October 2011. They have five children together.

Sogard's cousin Nick Sogard plays for the Boston Red Sox.
