= Bryan Dumesnil =

Canadian baseball player (born 1983)

- Pitcher
- Born: September 19, 1983 (age 42); Nanaimo, British Columbia, Canada
- Bats: Right Throws: Left
- Stats at Baseball Reference
Medals
Men's baseball
Representing Canada
Baseball World Cup
Bronze medal – third place	2009 Nettuno	Team

Bryan William Dumesnil (born September 19, 1983) is a Canadian former professional baseball pitcher.

== Career ==
Dumesnil was a member of the Nanaimo Pirates of the B.C. Premier Baseball League.

Dumesnil was a member of Team Canada during the 2009 World Baseball Classic, although he did not enter either of Canada's two games during the preliminary stage of the tournament at the Rogers Centre in Toronto, Ontario, Canada. He was also on Team Canada for the 2009 Baseball World Cup.

Dumesnil signed with the Los Angeles Dodgers organization in 2002, and played for the rookie-level Gulf Coast League Dodgers rookie-level Ogden Raptors.

In 2004, Dumesnil signed with the Baltimore Orioles organization. He split his time in the organization between the rookie-level Bluefield Orioles and Low-A Aberdeen IronBirds.

In 2006, Dumesnil joined the Can-Am League with the Québec Capitales and won the Can-Am league championship. He remained a Capitale until 2007 when the Atlanta Braves purchased his contract and assigned him to the Rome Braves in the South Atlantic League; he finished the year with the Myrtle Beach Pelicans in the Carolina League.

In 2008, Dumesnil returned to Myrtle Beach, followed up by an All-Star appearance and a promotion to Double-A with the Mississippi Braves, who subsequently won the league championship.

In 2009, Dumesnil began the season in Mississippi, but was later released from the Braves organization. Shortly thereafter, he was signed by the Toronto Blue Jays and assigned to the Double-A New Hampshire Fisher Cats.

From 2010 to 2012, Dumesnil played with the Southern Maryland Blue Crabs in the Atlantic League of Professional Baseball.
