= Brad Boxberger =

American baseball player (born 1988)

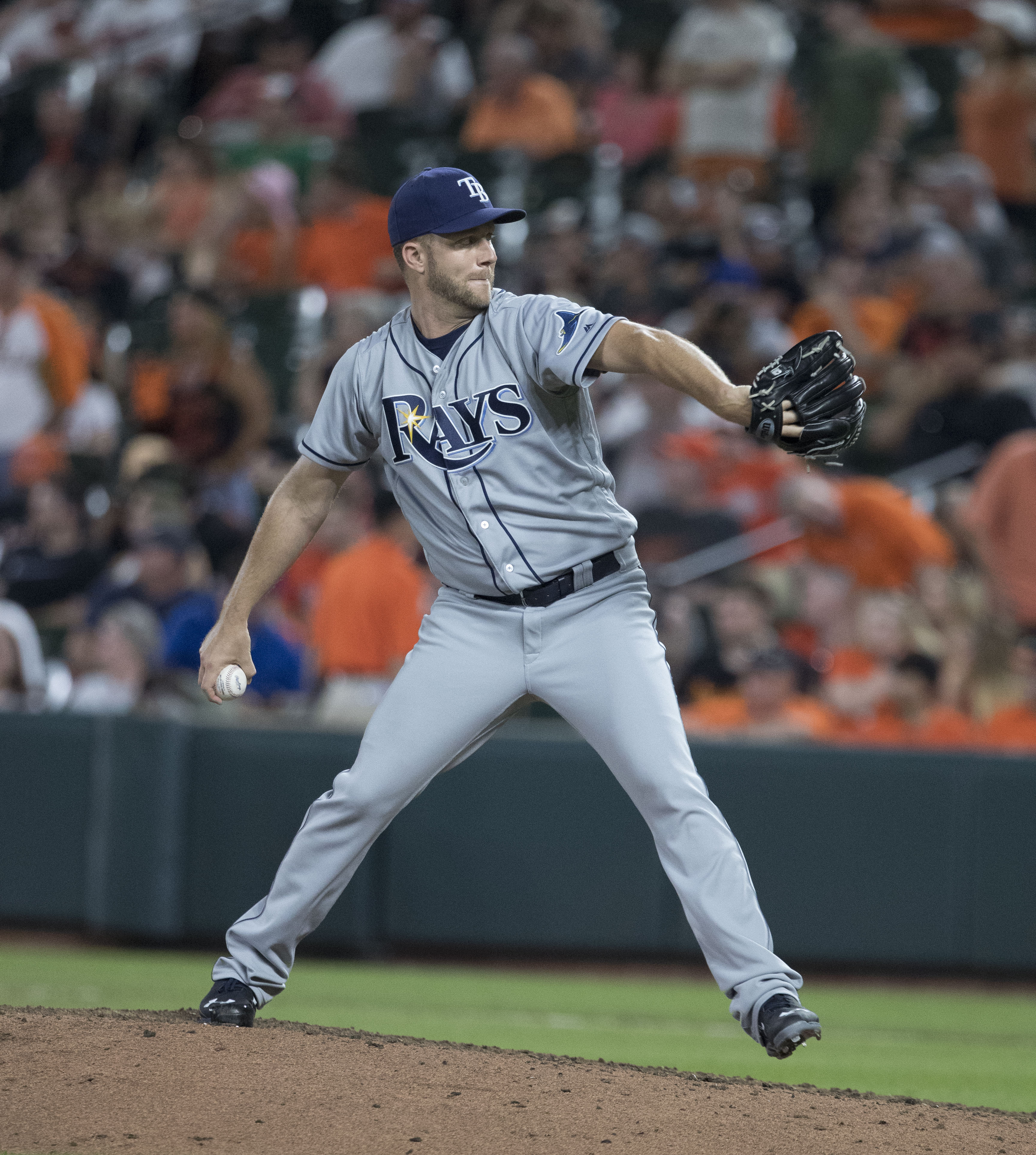
- Boxberger with the Tampa Bay Rays in 2017
- Pitcher
- Born: May 27, 1988 (age 38); Fullerton, California, U.S.
- Batted: Right Threw: Right

MLB debut
- June 10, 2012, for the San Diego Padres

Last MLB appearance
- September 21, 2023, for the Chicago Cubs

MLB statistics
- Win–loss record: 31–38
- Earned run average: 3.50
- Strikeouts: 581
- Saves: 84
- Stats at Baseball Reference

Teams
- San Diego Padres (2012–2013); Tampa Bay Rays (2014–2017); Arizona Diamondbacks (2018); Kansas City Royals (2019); Miami Marlins (2020); Milwaukee Brewers (2021–2022); Chicago Cubs (2023)

Career highlights and awards
- All-Star (2015); AL saves leader (2015)

Bradley George Boxberger (born May 27, 1988) is an American former professional baseball pitcher. He played in Major League Baseball (MLB) for the San Diego Padres, Tampa Bay Rays, Arizona Diamondbacks, Kansas City Royals, Miami Marlins, Milwaukee Brewers and Chicago Cubs.

Boxberger attended the University of Southern California (USC), where he played college baseball for the USC Trojans. Drafted in the first round of the 2009 MLB draft by the Cincinnati Reds, Boxberger played in minor league baseball for the Reds until was traded to the Padres after the 2011 season. Boxberger made his MLB debut with the Padres in 2012. The Padres traded him to Tampa Bay after the 2013 season.

== Amateur career ==
Boxberger attended Foothill High School in Santa Ana, California. He was drafted by the Kansas City Royals in the 20th round of the 2006 Major League Baseball draft, but did not sign, choosing to attend the University of Southern California (USC). For the USC Trojans baseball team, he was named a Second Team All-American by Rivals.com. Boxberger was a part of the USC rotation his freshman and junior year, and split his sophomore season between starting and relief. In 2007, he played collegiate summer baseball for the Orleans Cardinals of the Cape Cod Baseball League (CCBL), and returned to the CCBL the following summer to play for the Chatham A's. He was named a league all-star in both seasons.

== Professional career ==
=== Cincinnati Reds ===
Boxberger was drafted by the Cincinnati Reds in the first round (43rd overall) of the 2009 Major League Baseball draft, and signed. Boxberger made his professional debut with the Lynchburg Hillcats of the Class A-Advanced Carolina League in 2010. He was named to the Carolina League All-Star Team. He was then promoted to the Carolina Mudcats of the Class AA Southern League. He had a combined win–loss record of 5–10 with a 4.91 earned run average (ERA) in 36 games, including 13 starts, as he was converted from a starter to a reliever after the promotion.

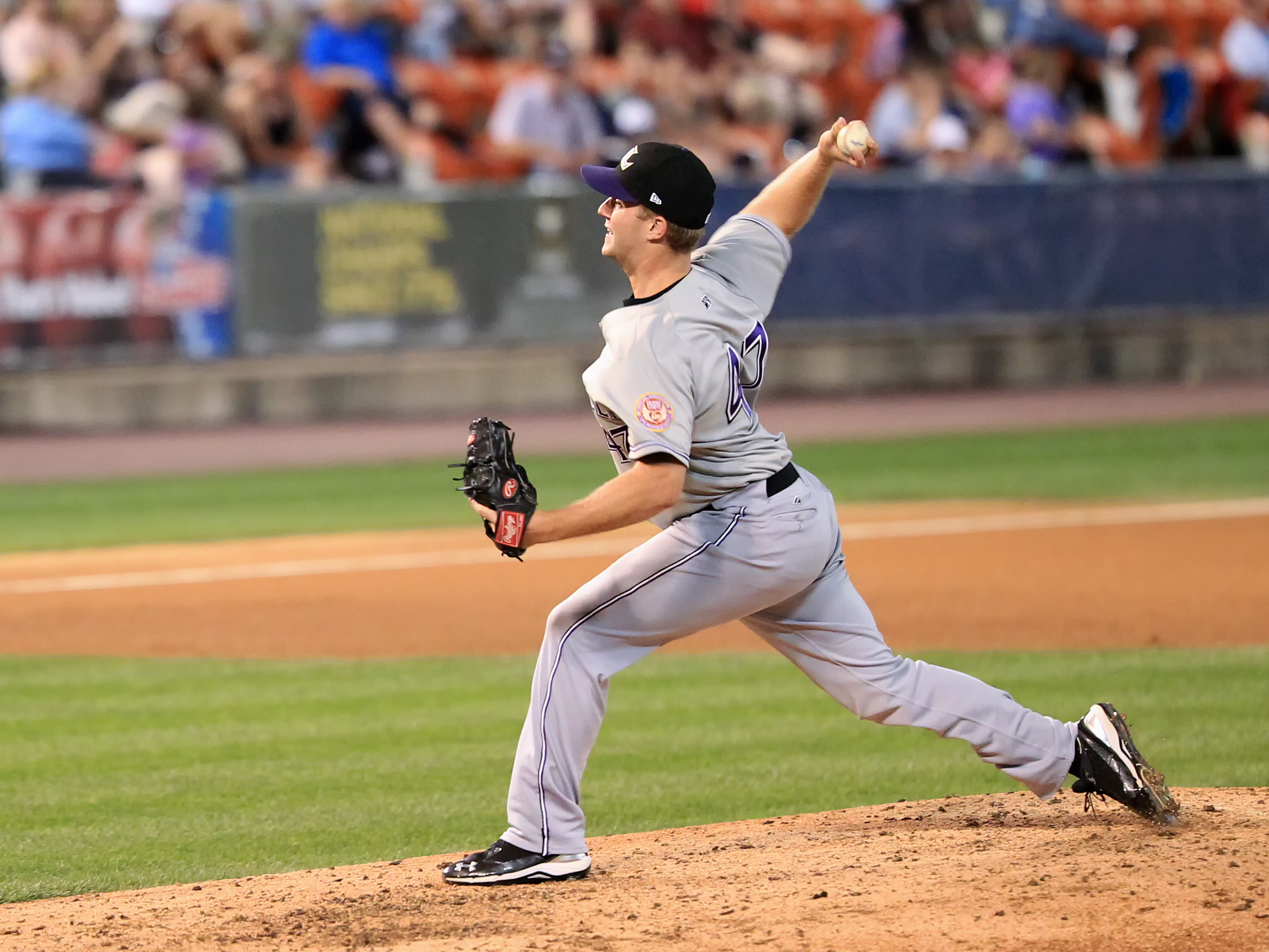
Boxberger pitching for the Louisville Bats in 2011

Boxberger began the 2011 season with the Mudcats, but was promoted to the Louisville Bats of the Class AAA International League. He finished the 2011 season with a 2.03 ERA and 11 saves in 55 games combined. He had the best strikeout ratio and lowest batting average against among all qualified Southern League relievers. Boxberger was the top Double-A closer in the minor leagues in 2011.

Boxberger pitched in the Arizona Fall League for the Phoenix Desert Dogs after the 2011 regular season, where he was named to the Top Prospects Team.

=== San Diego Padres ===
Boxberger, Yonder Alonso, Edinson Vólquez, and Yasmani Grandal were traded to the San Diego Padres for Mat Latos on December 17, 2011. Boxberger began the 2012 season with the Tucson Padres of the Class AAA Pacific Coast League. He was promoted to the major leagues on June 10, and made his debut the same day, pitching a hitless eighth inning against the Milwaukee Brewers in Miller Park.

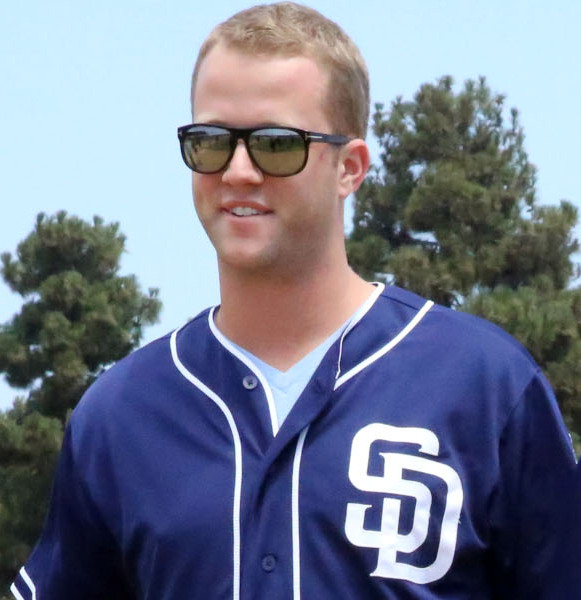
Boxberger with the Padres in 2013

Boxberger was returned to Tucson on June 26 after five relief appearances. He was called up to the majors again on July 30 when Joe Thatcher was placed on the disabled list and was optioned back to Triple-A on August 22 after eight appearances to make room on the roster for starter Andrew Werner. Boxberger joined the Padres again September 4 and remained with the club through the end of the season. In his time with Tucson, Boxberger posted a 2.70 ERA and 12.9 strike-outs per 9 innings over 37 games in relief. His totals for the 2012 season in 24 games with the Major League club were a 2.60 ERA and 33 strike-outs versus 18 walks in 27 2/3 innings.

Boxberger started the 2013 season with Tucson. He was recalled by the Padres on May 2, and optioned back to Tucson on May 11. The Padres recalled him again on June 2.

=== Tampa Bay Rays ===
On January 22, 2014, the Padres traded Boxberger, Logan Forsythe, Matt Lollis, Matt Andriese, and Maxx Tissenbaum to the Tampa Bay Rays in exchange for Alex Torres and Jesse Hahn. During spring training, the Rays optioned Boxberger to the Durham Bulls of the International League. On May 8, 2014, Boxberger entered a game against the Baltimore Orioles in the top of the sixth inning with the bases loaded and no outs. He proceeded to strike out the first three batters he faced on nine total pitches, thus becoming the second Rays pitcher ever to pitch an immaculate inning and the first major-league pitcher known to accomplish the feat with the bases loaded. In 63 games, Boxberger finished with a 2.37 ERA with 104 strikeouts in 64.2 innings. He also saved 2 games.

With Jake McGee on the disabled list (DL) at the start of the 2015 season, Boxberger served as the Rays' closer. He successfully converted his first ten save opportunities, and remained the closer after McGee's return. Boxberger was selected for the 2015 MLB All-Star Game. Boxberger finished the season with a 3.71 ERA in 69 appearances, converting 41 of 47 save opportunities to lead the American League.

In his first spring training appearance of 2016, Boxberger tore his adductor brevis muscle, requiring surgery. He began the season on the DL, returning to the Rays on May 30. In his first appearance of the 2016 season, Boxberger strained his left oblique muscle and went back on the DL, not returning until July. He made 27 appearances in 2016.

In the 2017 season, Boxberger was activated off the DL on June 20 after lat muscle and forearm injuries. He was given a setup role behind Álex Colomé. For the second straight season, he endured an injury plagued season, appearing in only 30 games.

=== Arizona Diamondbacks ===
On November 30, 2017, the Rays traded Boxberger to the Arizona Diamondbacks for Curtis Taylor. Boxberger won the closer competition in the 2018 spring training and served as the Diamondbacks closer. On September 10, he was removed as closer after a rough patch to begin the month. He had 32 saves at the time of his removal. He finished 3–7 with an ERA of 4.39 in 53 1/3 innings.

During MLB Players' Weekend from 2017 through 2019, players were allowed to use nicknames temporarily on the back of their jerseys for select games. In August 2018, Boxberger became the first major leaguer to represent his name in emojis on the back of his uniform. Boxberger used two consecutive emojis of a box and a burger ("📦🍔") as a homophone for his last name, an idea he said that his wife had helped create.

On November 30, 2018, the Diamondbacks non-tendered Boxberger and he became a free agent.

=== Kansas City Royals ===
On February 7, 2019, the Kansas City Royals signed Boxberger to a one-year contract for $2.2 million, with $1 million in performance bonuses. Boxberger was designated for assignment on June 26 and released on July 3.

=== Washington Nationals ===
Boxberger signed a minor-league deal with the Washington Nationals on July 12, 2019. He was assigned to the Double-A Harrisburg Senators. Boxberger was released on August 4, after pitching to a 1.04 ERA over eight games in the minors.

=== Cincinnati Reds ===
On August 5, 2019, the Cincinnati Reds signed Boxberger to a minor league deal and optioned him to the Triple-A Louisville Bats. Boxberger was released by the Reds organization on August 23.

=== Miami Marlins ===
On February 14, 2020, the Miami Marlins signed Boxberger to a minor league deal with a major league spring training invite. On July 23, Boxberger was selected to the active roster. Boxberger pitched to a 3.00 ERA over 18 innings during the regular season and also pitched 3 1/2 scoreless innings in the playoffs.

=== Milwaukee Brewers ===
On February 14, 2021, the Milwaukee Brewers signed Boxberger to a minor league contract that included an invitation to major league spring training. On March 26, 2021, Boxberger was released by the Brewers but re-signed with the team on a new minor league contract on March 28. On April 6, 2021, Boxberger was selected to the 40-man roster. In 2021, Boxberger recorded a 3.34 ERA with 83 strikeouts in 64 2/3 innings.

On March 13, 2022, Boxberger re-signed with the team on a one-year contract. On November 10, the Brewers declined Boxberger's $3 million option for the 2023 season, making him a free agent.

=== Chicago Cubs ===
On December 15, 2022, the Chicago Cubs signed Boxberger to a one-year contract. He began the 2023 season out of Chicago's bullpen, recording a 5.52 ERA across 17 appearances before he was placed on the injured list with a strained right forearm on May 15. He was transferred to the 60-day injured list on July 4. On September 8, Boxberger was activated from the injured list. He became a free agent following the season.

== Pitching style ==
Early in his major league career, Boxberger was considered a good fit for a late-inning role, either as a setup pitcher or closer. He had a four-seam fastball that ranges from 92–96 miles per hour (148–154 km/h), a changeup, a slider he throws at 88 miles per hour (142 km/h), and a 12-6 curveball he can throw from 78–81 miles per hour (126–130 km/h).

== Personal life ==
Boxberger's father, Rod, also attended USC and pitched for the Trojans. Rod was named the Most Outstanding Player of the 1978 College World Series. He pitched in 134 minor league games, mostly in Double-A.

Boxberger and his wife have a daughter and a son. They reside in Surprise, Arizona.
