= James Paxton (baseball) =

Canadian baseball player (born 1988)

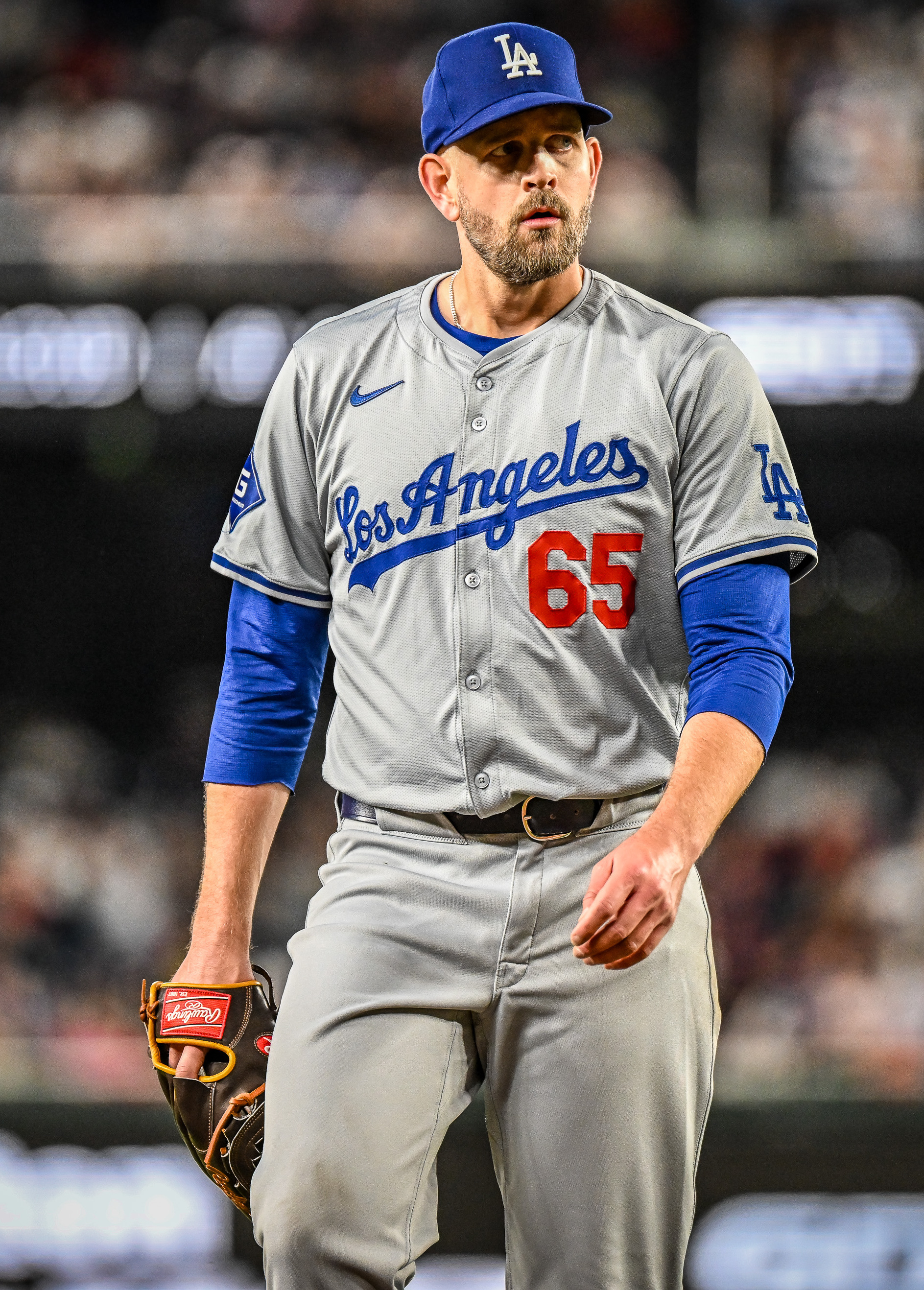
- Paxton with the Los Angeles Dodgers in 2024
- Pitcher
- Born: November 6, 1988 (age 37); Richmond, British Columbia, Canada
- Batted: Left Threw: Left

MLB debut
- September 7, 2013, for the Seattle Mariners

Last MLB appearance
- August 11, 2024, for the Boston Red Sox

MLB statistics
- Win–loss record: 73–41
- Earned run average: 3.77
- Strikeouts: 1,005
- Stats at Baseball Reference

Teams
- Seattle Mariners (2013–2018); New York Yankees (2019–2020); Seattle Mariners (2021); Boston Red Sox (2023); Los Angeles Dodgers (2024); Boston Red Sox (2024)

Career highlights and awards
- Pitched a no-hitter on May 8, 2018
Medals
Men's baseball
Representing Canada
World Junior Baseball Championship
| Bronze medal – third place | 2006 Sancti Spíritus | Team |

James Alston Paxton (born November 6, 1988), nicknamed "Big Maple", is a Canadian former professional baseball pitcher. He played in Major League Baseball (MLB) for the Seattle Mariners, New York Yankees, Boston Red Sox, and Los Angeles Dodgers.

Paxton played college baseball for the Kentucky Wildcats. He was selected by the Mariners in the fourth round of the 2010 MLB draft and made his MLB debut with them in 2013. On May 8, 2018, Paxton pitched a no-hitter against the Toronto Blue Jays, becoming the first Canadian major league pitcher to throw a no-hitter in Canada. Seattle traded Paxton to the Yankees after the 2018 season, though injuries limited him, particularly later in his career. He retired from MLB after the 2024 season.

Paxton pitched for the Canada national team in international competitions.

== Amateur career ==
=== North Delta Blue Jays ===
Paxton attended Delta Secondary School in Ladner, British Columbia. He played for the North Delta Blue Jays of the British Columbia Premier Baseball League (PBL) and for Team Canada at the under-18 level, earning a bronze medal at the 2006 World Junior Baseball Championship in Sancti Spíritus, Cuba. In his junior year, Paxton won 10 games and had a 1.51 earned run average (ERA) to go along with 100 strikeouts in 78 innings pitched. This led to him being named the top pitcher of the PBL and a first-team All-Star. After starting his senior year injured, Paxton finished the year with a 7–1 win–loss record and 65 strikeouts and 32 walks in 50 innings pitched. Both years, Paxton's team won the league title and the B.C.'s Best Tournament.

=== University of Kentucky ===
After graduating from high school in 2006, Paxton attended the University of Kentucky, where he played college baseball for the Kentucky Wildcat in the Southeastern Conference (SEC). As a freshman, he led the Wildcats in appearances with 25 and had a 2–0 record in relief with one save.

In 2008 as a sophomore, Paxton moved into the starting rotation midway through the season and made 11 starts out of 17 appearances. He finished the year 4–2 with a 2.92 ERA. That season, he pitched a complete-game shutout over Ole Miss to clinch a spot in the SEC Tournament and earn SEC Pitcher of the Week honors. However, he did not participate in the NCAA Tournament due to injury. That summer Paxton played collegiate summer baseball in the Alaska Baseball League, where he pitched in four games with three starts, finishing with a 1–0 record and a 2.25 ERA in 16 innings. He struck out 12 batters and allowed opponents to hit just .179 against him.

Paxton started 13 games in 2009, finishing 5–3 with 115 strikeouts (fifth best in school history) in 78 1/3 innings. He drew the attention of Major League Baseball scouts as he was considered a possible first-round draft pick. Paxton was named to the SEC Academic Honor Roll every year he was at Kentucky. He held a 3.3 grade point average heading into his senior year as an accounting major.

Paxton was drafted by the Toronto Blue Jays in the first round (37th overall) of the 2009 Major League Baseball draft. However, negotiations with the Blue Jays broke down over a dispute about his signing bonus, and he did not sign by the deadline. Although Paxton had intended to return to Kentucky for his senior season, Blue Jays' president Paul Beeston had told the press that he had been negotiating with agent Scott Boras instead of Paxton's family, which violated the NCAA rules. Paxton was subsequently ruled ineligible after an investigation. He sued the NCAA in an attempt to be reinstated, but lost the lawsuit in January 2010, and withdrew from school, one semester shy of graduation.

== Professional career ==
=== Grand Prairie AirHogs ===
After being ruled ineligible to return to Kentucky, Paxton signed with the Grand Prairie AirHogs in the independent American Association in 2010. There, he went 1–2 with a 4.08 ERA and 18 strikeouts in 17 2/3 innings.

=== Seattle Mariners ===
The Seattle Mariners selected Paxton in the fourth round of the 2010 Major League Baseball draft. After a lengthy negotiation, Paxton signed with the Mariners on March 4, 2011, for a $942,500 signing bonus. He began his professional career in 2011 with the Clinton LumberKings of the Single-A Midwest League, before earning a June promotion to the Double-A Jackson Generals of the Southern League. He finished with a combined 6–3 win–loss record, 2.37 ERA, 131 strikeouts, and 43 walks in 95 innings pitched, while allowing an opposing batting average of .215 in 17 games. Paxton and teammate Alex Liddi represented the Mariners at the 2011 All-Star Futures Game.

Paxton was invited to attend the Mariners' main spring training camp in 2012, but did not make the opening day roster and returned to Jackson, where he made 21 starts with a 9–4 record and 3.64 ERA. He played for the Peoria Javelinas of the Arizona Fall League after the minor league season ended. For 2013, Paxton was promoted to the Tacoma Rainiers of the Triple-A Pacific Coast League, where he made 26 starts and was 8–11 with a 4.45 ERA. He worked with the coaching staff to change his pitching mechanics to mirror that of Clayton Kershaw, resulting in an improvement in his performance.

On September 3, 2013, Paxton was promoted to the major leagues for the first time and debuted on September 7 in a start against the Tampa Bay Rays. He allowed two runs on four hits and one walk in six innings to earn the win. His first major league strikeout was of Desmond Jennings in the third inning. Paxton made three more starts and finished with a 3–0 record and 1.50 ERA.

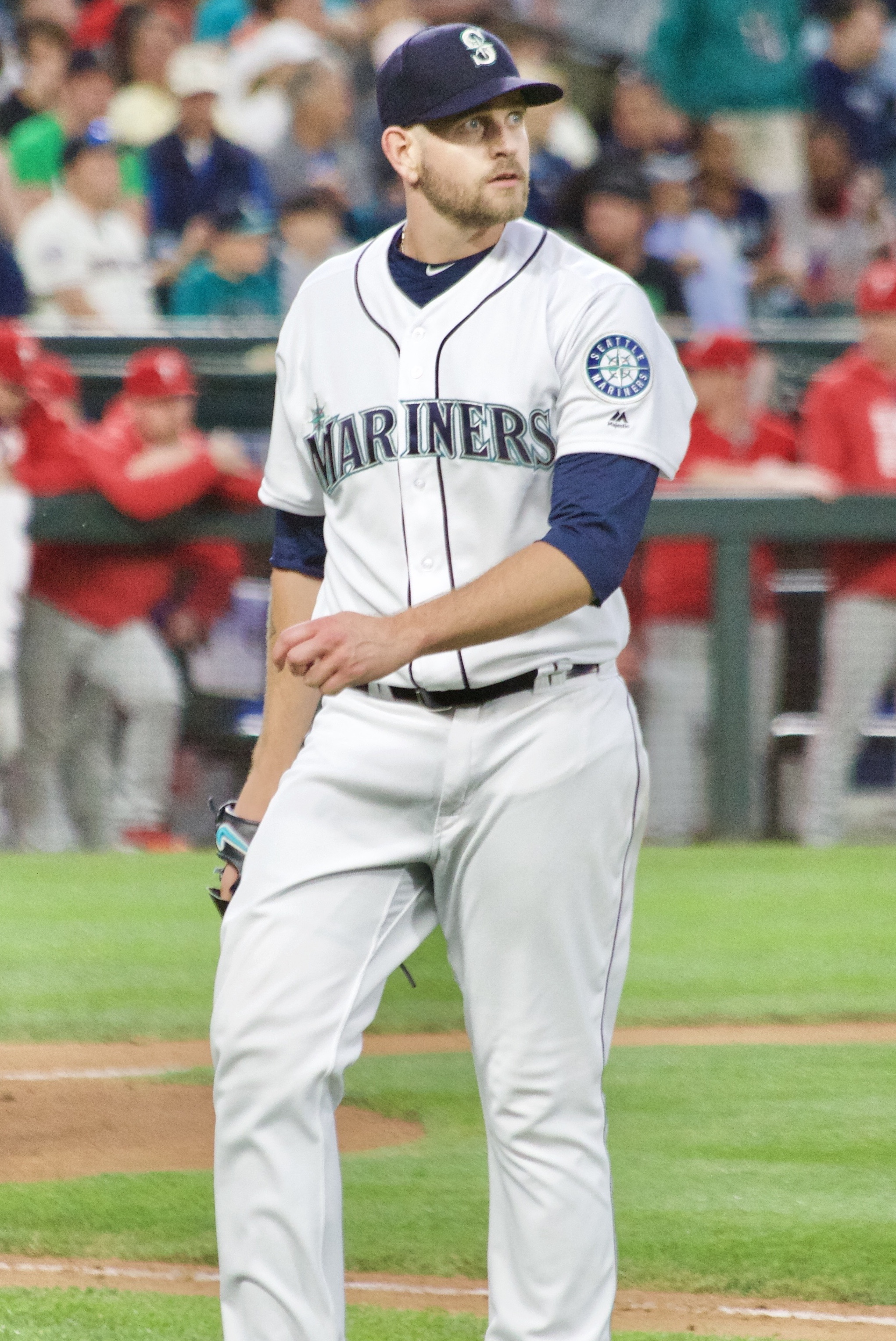
Paxton with the Mariners in 2017

Paxton began the 2014 season in the Mariners rotation, but after his second start of the season, he was placed on the disabled list with a left lat strain. After a difficult rehab he finally rejoined the Mariners on August 2 and finished the season with 13 starts, a 3–4 record and a 3.04 ERA. Paxton's injury woes would continue into the 2015 season, as he hurt himself during agility drills in spring training and then was shut down on May 29 with a strained tendon on the middle finger of his pitching hand. After another long rehab he didn't rejoin the Mariners until September 13. Paxton made 13 starts for the second straight year, with a 3–4 record and 3.90 ERA.

In 2016, Paxton had a poor spring training, allowing five home runs and a 10.80 ERA in 15 innings, causing him to be optioned to Triple-A Tacoma to begin the season. He made 11 starts in the minors, posting a 3.73 ERA, and was recalled on June 1 when Félix Hernández landed on the disabled list. Paxton made 20 starts for the Mariners the rest of the season, finishing with a 6–7 record and 3.79 ERA.

Paxton started the 2017 season for the Mariners by not allowing a run over his first three starts, winning the American League (AL) Player of the Week Award for April 10–16. On May 5, he was placed on the disabled list due to a left forearm strain, returning on May 31. He pitched exceedingly well in July, going 6–0 and earning a share of the AL Player of the Week Award for July 24–30 and the AL Pitcher of the Month for July. However, on August 10, Paxton strained his left pectoral muscle pitching against the Los Angeles Angels, putting him on the disabled list once again. He returned on September 15 and finished the season with a 12–5 record and 2.98 ERA in 24 starts while tying for the major league lead in wild pitches, with 15.

Mariners fans created a rooting section for Paxton called the Maple Grove in the left field bleachers of Safeco Field. The section, based on Paxton's Big Maple nickname and Canadian heritage, included an artificial tree and fans holding sigs and chanting "eh" when Paxton reached two strikes facing a batter. Paxton met some fans from the section before a game, giving them maple bars. Paxton and the Mariners commemorated the section for one game in 2025, following his retirement.

On May 8, 2018, Paxton threw a no-hitter against the Blue Jays at Rogers Centre. He threw 99 pitches while issuing three walks in a 5–0 victory, becoming the second Canadian to throw a no-hitter (the first was Dick Fowler of the Philadelphia Athletics in 1945). He was also the first Canadian major league pitcher to throw a no-hitter in Canada and the first Mariners pitcher to throw a no-hitter in a road game. He finished the season 11–6 with a 3.76 ERA in 28 starts.

=== New York Yankees ===
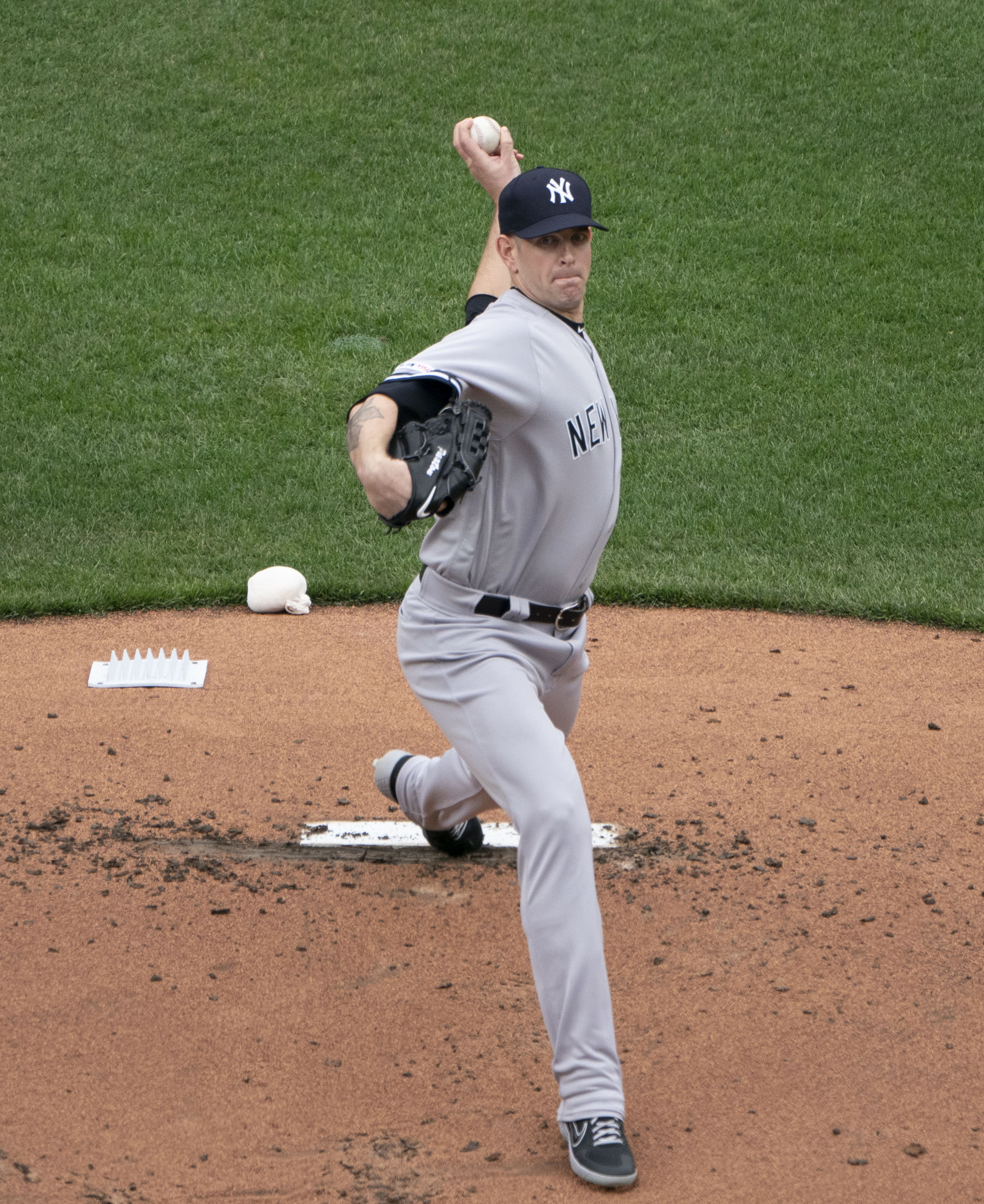
Paxton with the Yankees in 2019

On November 19, 2018, the Mariners traded Paxton to the New York Yankees for Justus Sheffield, Dom Thompson-Williams, and Erik Swanson. On April 21, 2019, Paxton became the second Yankees pitcher to strike out at least 12 batters in consecutive starts, following David Cone in 1998. In 2019, Paxton was 15–6 with a 3.82 ERA in 29 starts, in which he struck out 186 batters in 150 2/3 innings.

On February 5, 2020, Paxton underwent spinal surgery but due to the season being delayed by the COVID-19 pandemic made it back for opening day. He made five starts, pitching to a 1–1 record with a 6.64 ERA and 26 strikeouts over 20 1/3 innings pitched. He was shut down after his August 20 start because of a strain of his left flexor tendon and missed the rest of the season. He became a free agent after the season.

=== Seattle Mariners (second stint) ===
On February 18, 2021, Paxton agreed to a one-year, $8.5 million contract to return to the Mariners. In his first start of the season on April 6 against the Chicago White Sox, Paxton threw only 24 pitches before being removed from the game with left elbow discomfort. Two days later, it was announced that he would undergo Tommy John surgery, ending his season after only one game.

=== Boston Red Sox ===
On December 1, 2021, Paxton signed a one-year, $10 million contract with the Boston Red Sox that included a two-year club option and lower-value, one-year player option. On March 16, he was placed on the 60-day injured list, as he continued his recovery from surgery. He made one rehab start in the Florida Complex League on August 18, but suffered a lateral muscle tear and was shut down for the season. Following the season, Paxton exercised his $4 million player option to return to the Red Sox in 2023.

Paxton began the 2023 season on the injured list with a right hamstring strain and made his season debut on May 12 against the St. Louis Cardinals. He was named the AL Pitcher of the Month for June after posting a 1.74 ERA and a 3–0 record in five starts during the month. Paxton's success and contract situation allowed rumors to swirl that the Red Sox might trade him prior to the trade deadline. However, pushing for a wild card spot, as well as having injuries within the starting rotation, the Red Sox held onto Paxton. After the trade deadline, Paxton struggled, posting a 1–3 record and 7.62 ERA after the deadline, in sharp contrast to his 6–2 record and 3.34 ERA prior. On September 10, he was placed on the injured list due to right knee inflammation, ending his season. Overall, Paxton had a 7–5 record with a 4.50 ERA in 96 innings pitched. He became a free agent following the season.

=== Los Angeles Dodgers ===
On January 29, 2024, Paxton signed a one-year, $7 million contract with the Los Angeles Dodgers, that also contained performance bonuses based on number of starts. The original deal was for $11 million but was reworked due to unspecified health issues. Paxton started 18 games for the Dodgers, compiling an 8–2 record and 4.43 ERA with 64 strikeouts before he was designated for assignment on July 22.

=== Boston Red Sox (second stint) ===
On July 26, 2024, Paxton was traded back to the Red Sox in exchange for minor-league infielder Moises Bolivar. On July 30, Paxton recorded his 1,000th career strikeout against the team that drafted and signed him, the Mariners. On August 11, Paxton exited a game against the Houston Astros in the first inning after sustaining a right calf strain. On August 23, he was moved to the 60-day injured list, and was expected to miss the rest of the season due to the calf injury, which was reclassified as a partial tear. Overall between both the Dodgers and Red Sox, Paxton finished the season with a 9–3 record in 21 starts. He surpassed 100 innings pitched for the first time since 2019.

Paxton announced on September 11 that he would retire at the end of the year.

== International career ==
Commemorative bobblehead of pitcher James Paxton with Challenger the bald eagle on his shoulder.

Paxton pitched for Canada in the 2026 World Baseball Classic. He took the loss and a blown save against Panama, making a throwing error and allowing three unearned runs in 1 2/3 innings. He threw 2 2/3 scoreless innings against Cuba in their pool-clinching win, and later said that he plans to remain retired and spend time with his family, despite his strong performance in the tournament.

== Pitching style ==
A power pitcher with a long stride and a 3/4 release from a closed position that hides most of his deliveries, comparable to a faster version of Andy Petitte, Paxton relied on a four-seam fastball that ranged in velocities in the high 90s miles per hour (MPH). He complemented his four-seam fastball with a cutter (high 80s MPH) and a knuckle curve (low 80s MPH). He decreased the use of his sinker/changeup. His strikeout pitches were high fastballs and a low inside knuckle curve against right-handers. His increased usage of knuckle curves on the first pitch of at bats limited the number of hits and runs that he allowed during the end of the 2019 season.

== Personal life ==
Paxton and his wife resided in Kirkland, Washington during the offseason.

Paxton co-hosted a podcast for one year following his retirement as a player.

== See also ==
- List of Major League Baseball no-hitters

Awards and achievements
| Preceded by Walker Buehler, Tony Cingrani, Yimi García, Adam Liberatore | No-hitter pitcher May 8, 2018 | Succeeded by Mike Fiers |
