= Jeff Francis =

Canadian baseball player (born 1981)

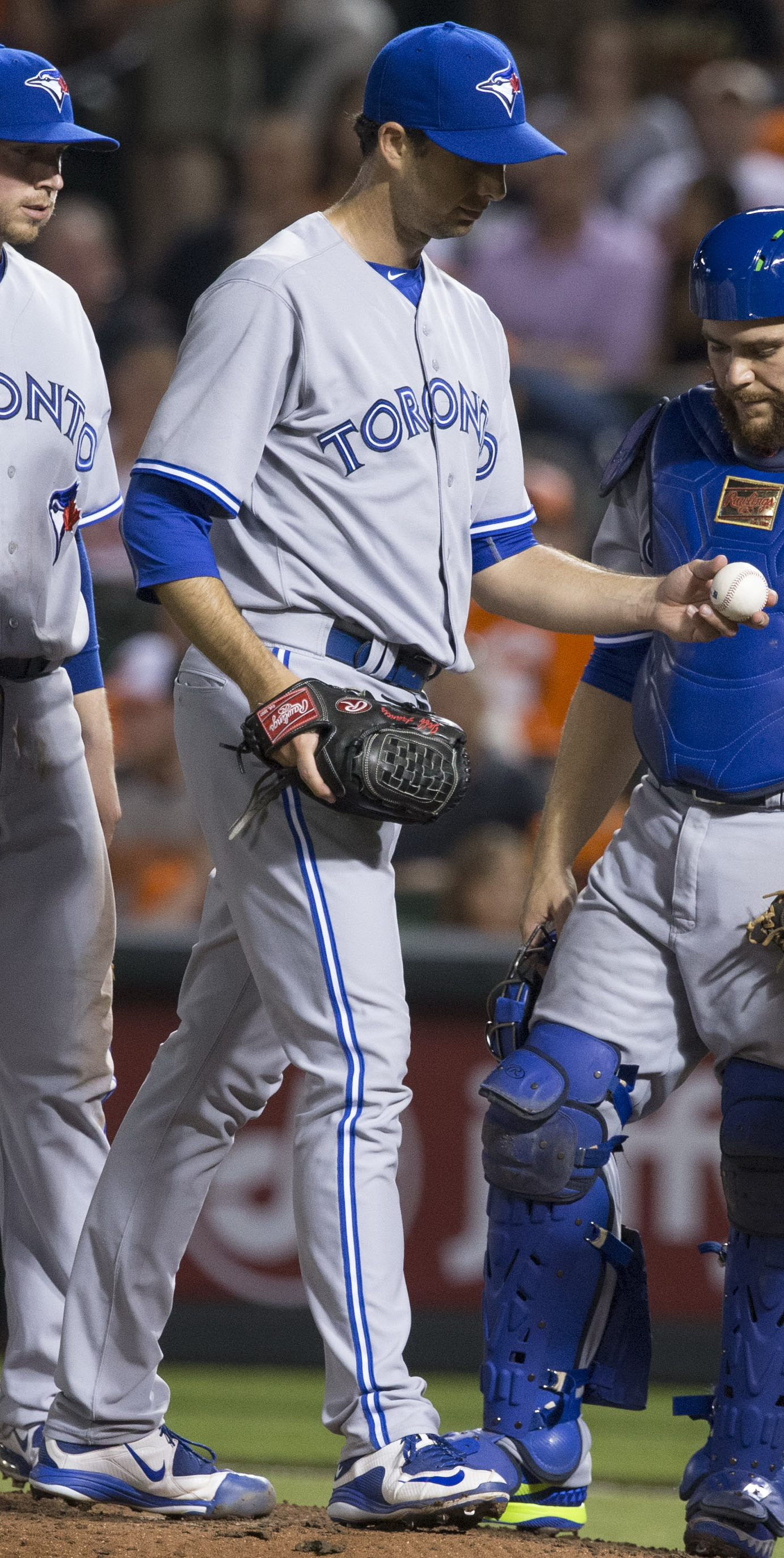
- Francis with the Toronto Blue Jays in 2015
- Pitcher
- Born: January 8, 1981 (age 45); Vancouver, British Columbia, Canada
- Batted: Left Threw: Left

MLB debut
- August 25, 2004, for the Colorado Rockies

Last MLB appearance
- October 4, 2015, for the Toronto Blue Jays

MLB statistics
- Win–loss record: 72–82
- Earned run average: 4.97
- Strikeouts: 869
- Stats at Baseball Reference

Teams
- Colorado Rockies (2004–2008, 2010); Kansas City Royals (2011); Colorado Rockies (2012–2013); Cincinnati Reds (2014); Oakland Athletics (2014); New York Yankees (2014); Toronto Blue Jays (2015)

Member of the Canadian

Baseball Hall of Fame
- Induction: 2022
Medals
Men's baseball
Representing Canada
Pan American Games
Gold medal – first place	2015 Toronto	Team

Jeffrey William Francis (born January 8, 1981) is a Canadian former professional baseball pitcher. He played in Major League Baseball (MLB) for the Colorado Rockies, Kansas City Royals, Cincinnati Reds, Oakland Athletics, New York Yankees, and Toronto Blue Jays. He is an inductee of the Canadian Baseball Hall of Fame.

== Early life ==
Francis attended Burnsview Junior Secondary School and North Delta Senior Secondary School in North Delta, British Columbia. After playing for the North Delta Blue Jays of the B.C. Premier Baseball League, the highest calibre junior league in British Columbia, Francis went on to pursue a major in physics at the University of British Columbia while playing for the UBC Thunderbirds.

== Professional career ==
=== Colorado Rockies ===
Francis was selected in the 1st round (9th overall) by the Colorado Rockies in the 2002 Major League Baseball draft. Along with Adam Loewen, who was selected at fourth overall in the same draft, the two received much publicity as they were drafted higher than any other Canadian baseball players up to that time.

In 2004, Francis was named Minor League Player of the Year by both Baseball America and USA Today, becoming the first player in Colorado Rockies organizational history to win either of the awards. He became the fourth player to be honoured in the same season by both publications, joining Andruw Jones (1995–1996), Rick Ankiel (1999), and Josh Beckett (2001). Combined between Double-A Tulsa and Triple-A Colorado Springs, Francis went 16–3 with a 2.21 ERA and .194 average against in 24 starts. He struck out 196 batters in 154.2 innings pitched, for a ratio of 11.4 per nine innings. He had more strikeouts than hits (108) and walks (29) combined.

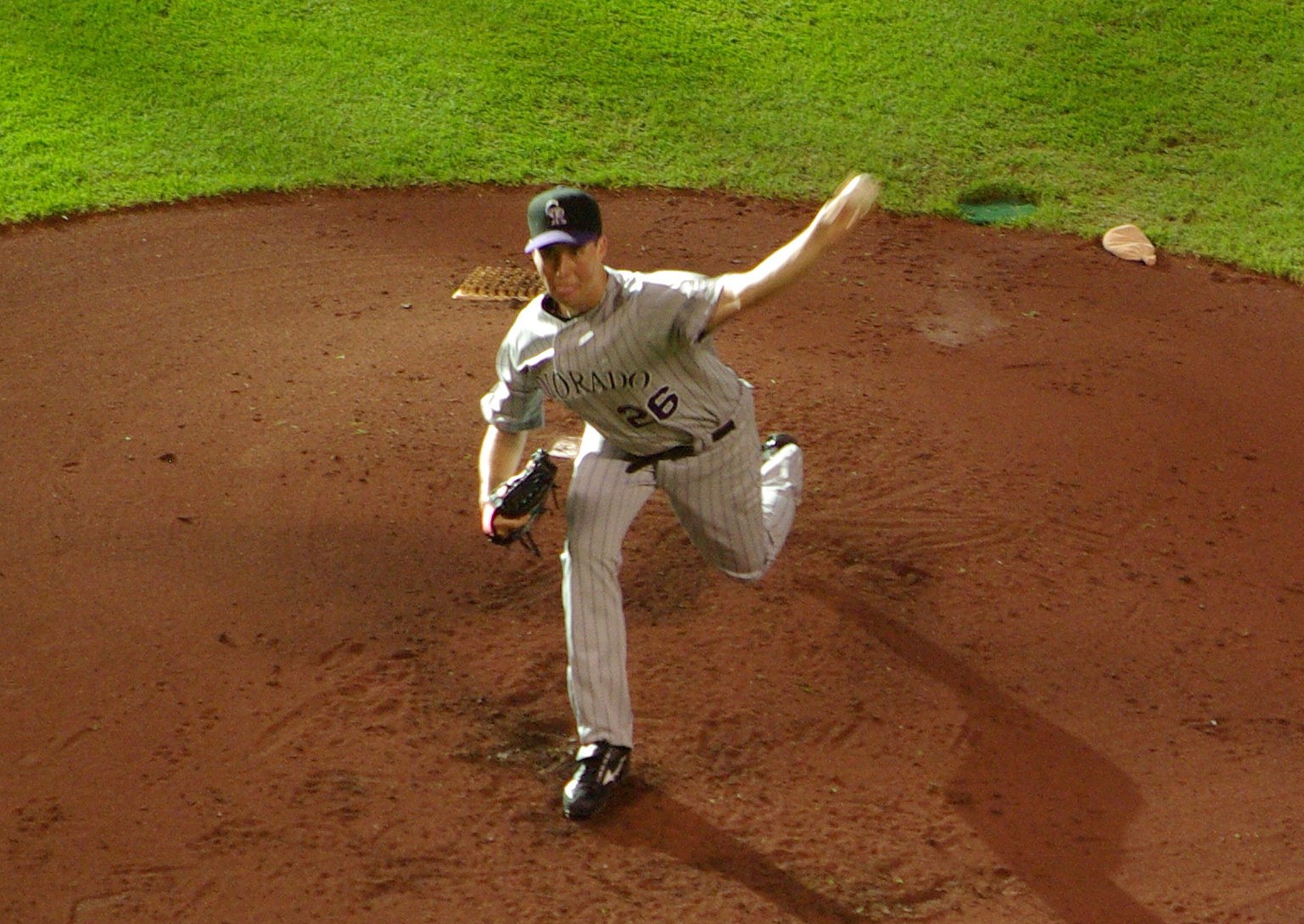
Francis with the Colorado Rockies in 2007

==== 2004: rookie year ====
Francis made his major league debut on August 25, 2004, against the Atlanta Braves, losing the 8–1 decision. He pitched five innings, allowing six runs (on three home runs), walking one, while striking out eight hitters. He earned his first career victory on September 5, 2004, against the San Diego Padres at Petco Park, tossing 5 1/3 scoreless innings in a 5–2 victory for the Rockies. Francis finished the year with a 3–2 record, with a 5.16 ERA.

==== 2005 ====
In 2005, Francis was a mainstay in the rotation, pitching in 33 starts for the Rockies. Although he finished with a 14–12 record, his ERA was 5.68 and his WHIP was at 1.62 while allowing 228 hits in 183 innings.

==== 2006 ====
On September 23, 2006, Francis notched his 30th career win against the Atlanta Braves. In the process, he passed Brian Bohanon to become the left-handed pitcher with the most wins in Rockies history.

Francis finished the season with an ERA of 4.16, more than a run lower from the previous year. He also won 13 games for the Rockies.

On November 22, 2006, Francis signed a four-year deal worth $13.25 million, carrying an option for a fifth year at $9 million. Under MLB rules, the option year would be his first year eligible for free agency. The contract will allow the Rockies/Francis to avoid going to arbitration every year.

==== 2007 ====
Francis had a career year while leading the Rockies into the playoffs for the first time in over a decade. He finished the season with a career-best 17 wins, 165 strikeouts and 215 1/3 innings.

On October 3, 2007, Francis became the first Canadian starting pitcher to win a Major League Baseball postseason game by beating the Philadelphia Phillies. It was his first postseason appearance.

On October 24, 2007, Francis became the second Canadian starting pitcher to pitch in the World Series but struggled in lasting only four innings and allowing six runs. The Rockies went on to lose the game 13–1, as well as the series to the Boston Red Sox.

==== 2008–09: injury-plagued ====
Like many of his Rockies teammates, Francis struggled to replicate his 2007 success during the 2008 season. He finished the year with a 4–10 record and a 5.01 ERA in 21 starts, although he reported pitching through shoulder soreness for much of the season.

Francis underwent arthroscopic surgery on his left shoulder on February 25. As a result, he missed the entire 2009 season. In addition, the surgery forced Francis to decline the invitation to play for Team Canada in the 2009 World Baseball Classic.

==== 2010 ====
Francis began the 2010 season on the disabled list. In his first game back since his injury, Francis pitched seven innings, allowing two walks and seven hits in a 3–2 Rockies win over the Nationals on May 16, 2010. Francis pitched in 20 games for the Rockies in 2010 posting a 4–6 record with a 5.00 ERA. He became a free agent following the season.

=== Kansas City Royals ===
==== 2011 ====
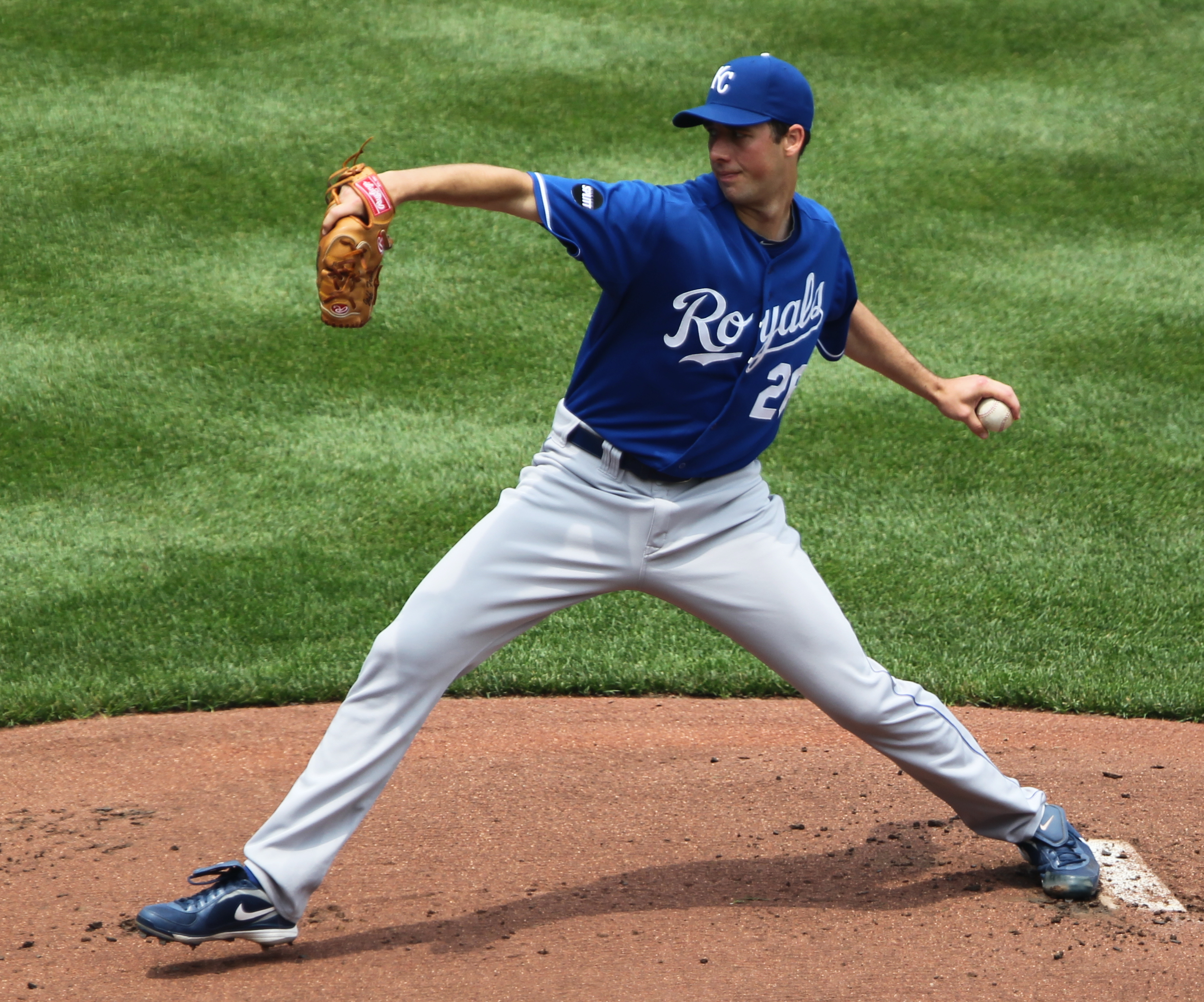
Francis while with the Kansas City Royals

On January 14, 2011, Francis agreed to a one-year contract with the Kansas City Royals for $2 million plus performance bonuses. He became Kansas City's #2 Starter and led them in most pitching categories throughout the first half of the year.

2011 was an odd season for Francis, he was 3–7 at home with an ERA of 4.18 while on the road his ERA was a full run higher, at 5.48 while recording a record of 3–9. He finished with a 6–16 record for the Royals. After the season, he elected free agency on October 30.

=== Cincinnati Reds ===
On January 25, 2012, Francis agreed to a minor league contract with the Cincinnati Reds. Francis decided to exercise a June 1 opt-out clause after pitching a complete-game shutout for the Triple A Louisville Bats.

=== Second stint with the Rockies ===
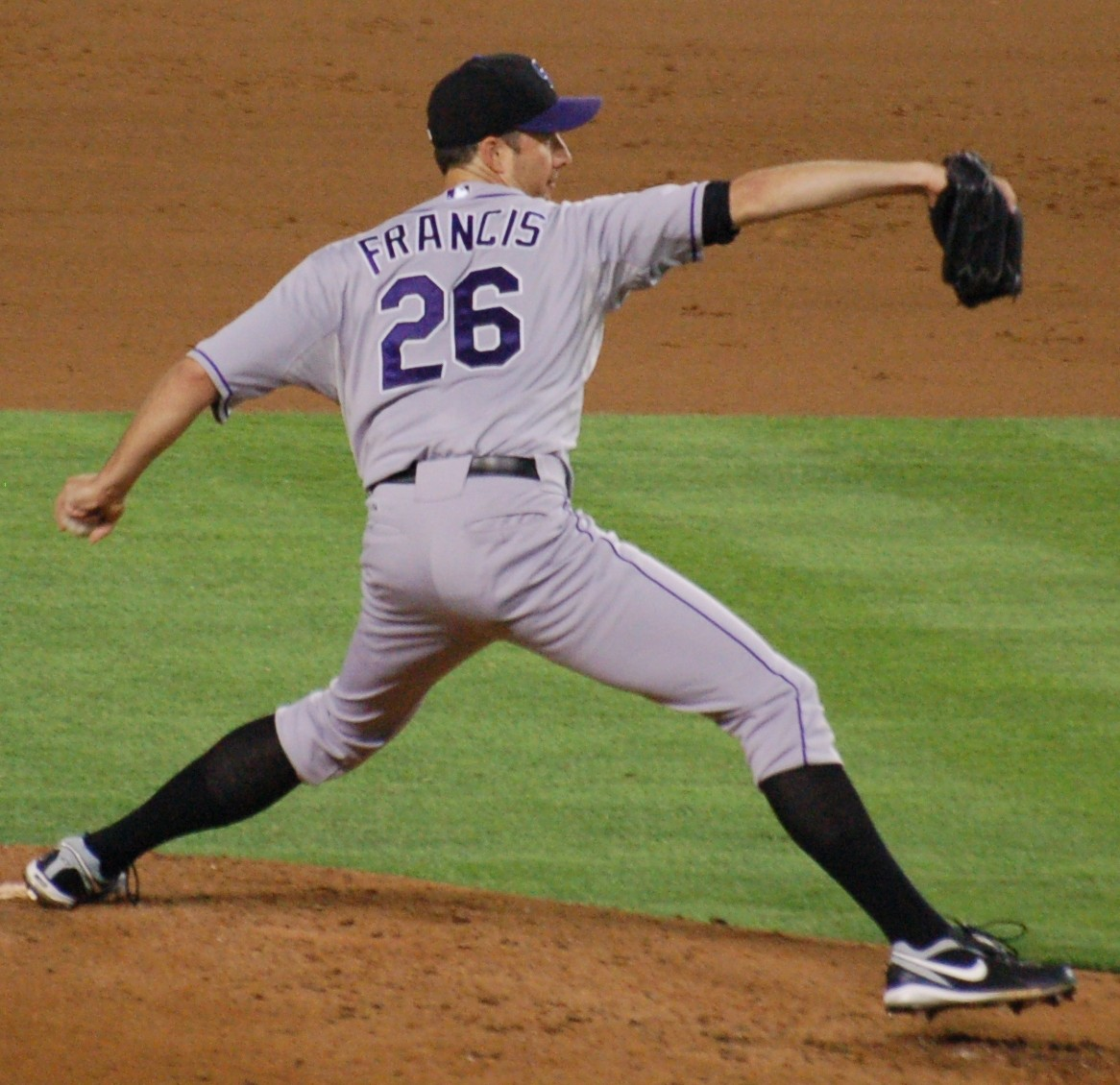
Francis pitching for the Colorado Rockies in 2012

After opting out of his contract with the Reds, Francis agreed to a major league deal with the Rockies on June 7, 2012. The next day, he started against the Los Angeles Angels of Anaheim. Francis finished the season in the rotation with an ERA of 5.58 in 113 innings.

After becoming a free agent on October 29, 2012, Francis re-signed with the Colorado Rockies on December 19.

2013 was a horrible year for Francis as he pitched half the season in the bullpen, appearing in 23 games while making 12 starts. He finished 3–5 with an ERA of 6.27, his worst in his MLB career. He became a free agent following the season.

=== Second stint with the Reds ===
On January 13, 2014, Francis signed a minor-league contract with an invitation to spring training with the Cincinnati Reds. He started the season with the Louisville Bats, and his contract was selected by the Reds on May 15. He was designated for assignment and placed on waivers the next day after allowing three runs in five innings to pick up the loss in his one start for the Reds.

=== Oakland Athletics ===
On May 18, 2014, Francis was claimed off waivers from the Reds by the Oakland Athletics. He was designated for assignment on July 3.

=== New York Yankees ===
On July 11, 2014, Francis was acquired by the New York Yankees. He was designated for assignment on July 28, and subsequently released on August 5.

=== Toronto Blue Jays ===
On October 31, 2014, he signed a minor league contract with the Toronto Blue Jays that included an invitation to spring training. On March 31, 2015, he was assigned to the Triple-A Buffalo Bisons. His contract was purchased from Buffalo on April 19. He made his debut that day, and in pitching to Russell Martin, formed the first all-Canadian battery in franchise history. Francis was designated for assignment on May 18, and outrighted to Triple-A Buffalo on May 20. On September 1, Francis was called up by the Blue Jays. He made a total of 14 relief appearances for the Blue Jays in 2015, posting a 1–2 record, 6.14 ERA, and 21 strikeouts in 22 total innings.

On December 15, 2015, Francis announced his retirement.

In 1291 innings pitched during his MLB career, Francis was 72–82 with an ERA of 4.97 and 869 strikeouts. A good fielding pitcher, he committed only one error in 255 total chances for a .996 fielding percentage. His only miscue occurred on June 28, 2008, as a member of the Rockies against the Tigers.

In February 2022, Francis was elected to the Canadian Baseball Hall of Fame; he was inducted in June 2022.

== Personal life ==
Francis and his wife Allison Padfield were married on December 31, 2005, in London, Ontario. In late 2009, Allison gave birth to the couple's first child, a daughter named Cameron. In December 2011, Allison gave birth to their son, Miles.

== International competition ==
Francis was selected to the Canada national baseball team for the 2006 World Baseball Classic and 2015 Pan American Games.

In the 2015 Pan American Games Men's baseball tournament, he won a gold medal.
