= Shawn Bowman =

Canadian baseball player & coach (born 1984)

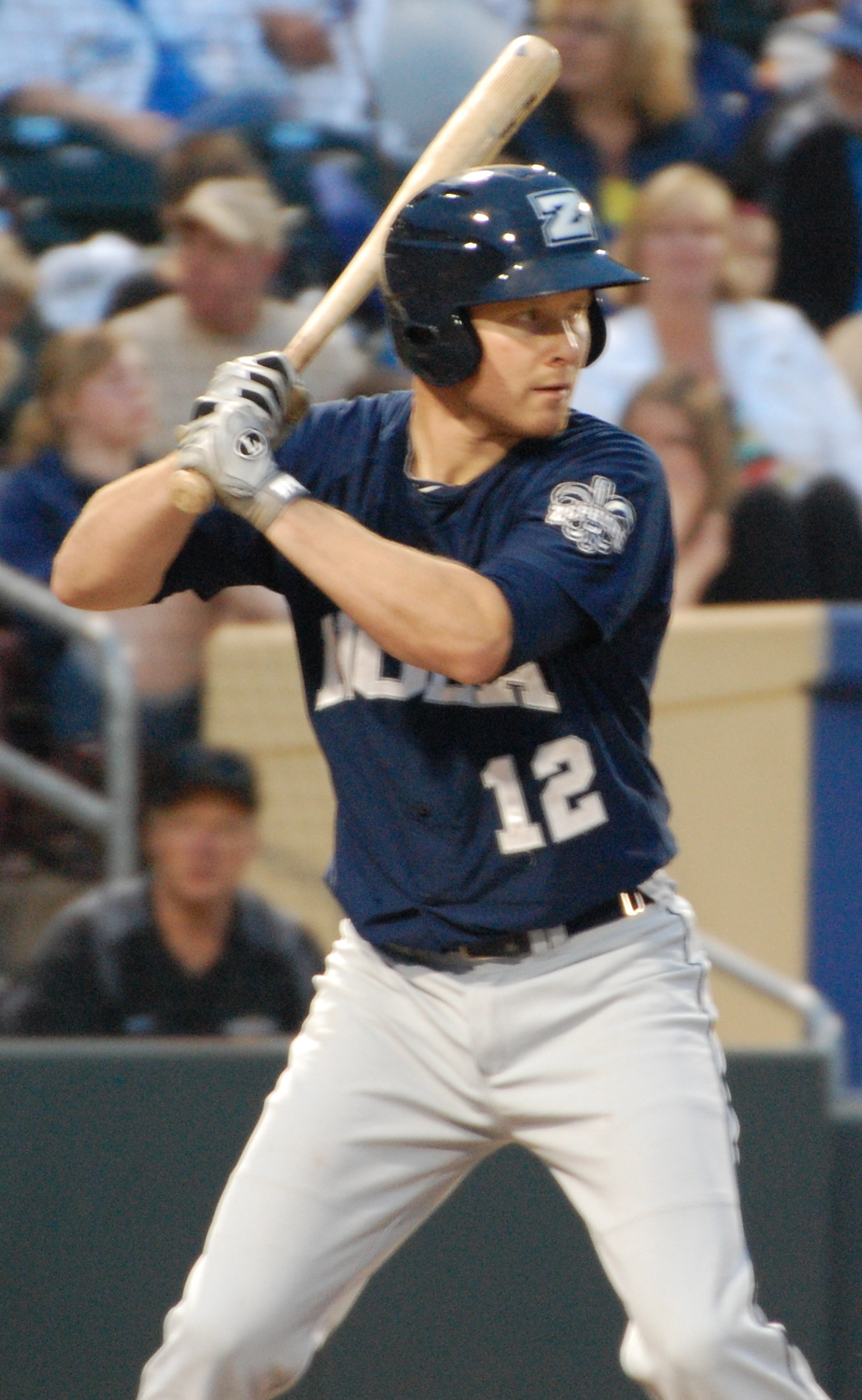
- Bowman with the New Orleans Zephyrs in 2012

Pittsburgh Pirates – No. 80
- Third baseman / Coach
- Born: December 9, 1984 (age 41); New Westminster, British Columbia, Canada
- Bats: Right Throws: Right
- Stats at Baseball Reference
Medals
Men's baseball
Representing Canada
Baseball World Cup
Bronze medal – third place	2009 Nettuno	Team
Pan American Games
Gold medal – first place	2011 Guadalajara	Team

Shawn Douglas Bain Bowman (born December 9, 1984) is a Canadian former professional baseball third-baseman and current manager of the Indianapolis Indians.

== Early life ==
Bowman attended Dr. Charles Best Secondary School in Coquitlam, British Columbia and was the starting third-baseman for the Coquitlam Reds of the B.C. Premier Baseball League. Bowman also played shortstop for Team Canada at the 2002 World Junior Baseball Championship, where he was named to the tournament All-Star Team after hitting 12 RBIs in 5 games.

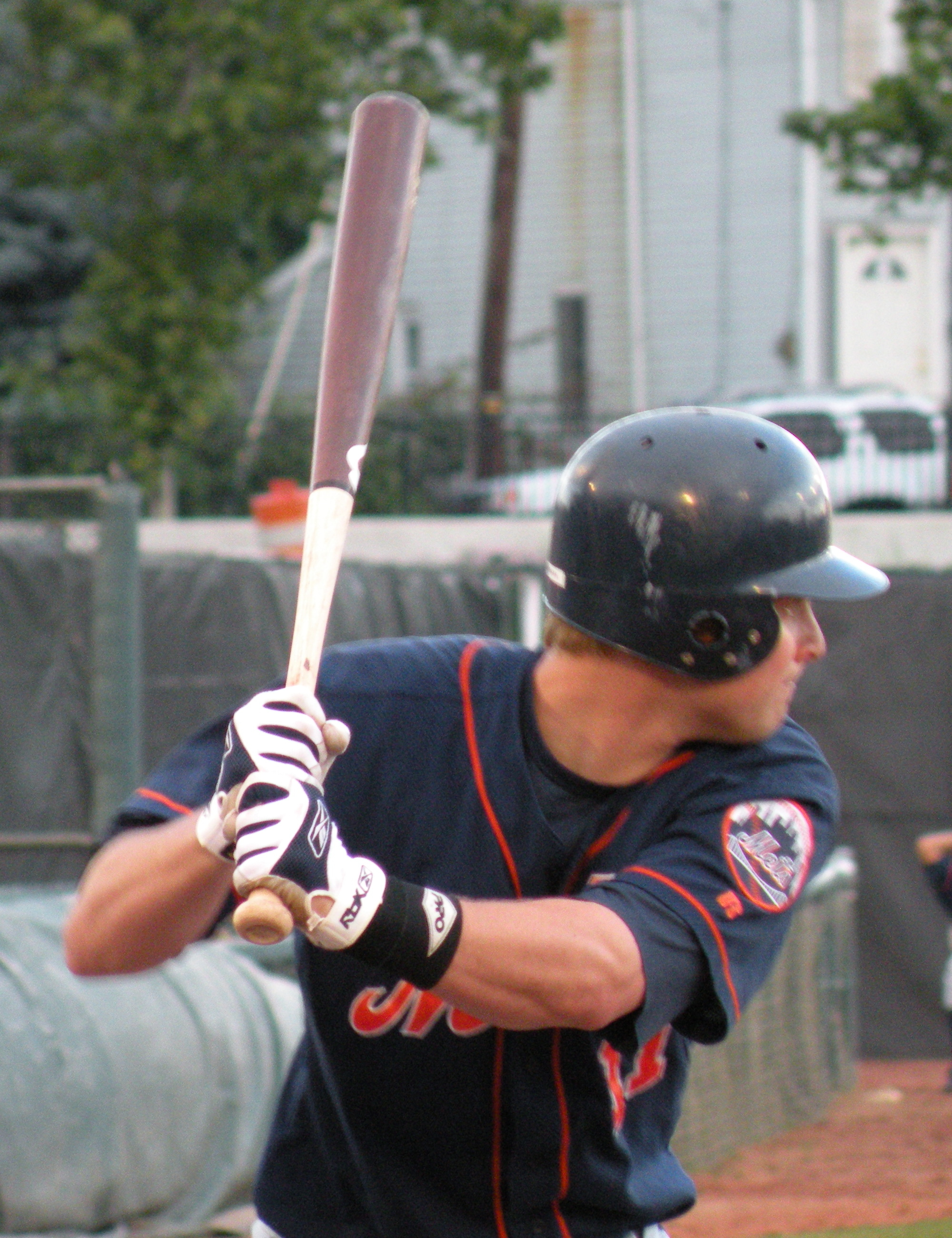
Bowman batting for the Binghamton Mets in 2009

== Professional career ==
Although Bowman was drafted by the New York Mets in the 12th round (357th overall) in the 2002 Major League Baseball draft, they failed to agree upon a contract in time for him to play during the 2002 season. Bowman would begin his professional career during the 2003 season when he spent time with both the Kingsport Mets and the Brooklyn Cyclones. He went on to have a successful 2004 season playing for the Capital City Bombers where he hit .258, had 19 home runs and 69 RBI in 116 games played. However, he began to develop chronic back problems during the 2005 season while playing for the St. Lucie Mets of the Florida State League, and was only healthy enough to play in 125 games from over the next three seasons.

A healthy Bowman returned to the St. Lucie lineup on June 17, 2008, and would go on to hit .340 over the next 26 games before earning a promotion to the Double-A Binghamton Mets. Although he began his Binghamton career with an 8-game hitting streak, he would only go on to hit .214 over his final 84 at-bats of the 2008 season.

Although he was on Canada's roster for the 2009 World Baseball Classic, Bowman did not make an appearance during either of the team's games.

Bowman was claimed off waivers by the Toronto Blue Jays on April 14, 2010.

On November 22, 2010, Bowman signed a minor league contract with the Atlanta Braves organization. In 2011, he made 65 appearances split between the rookie-level Gulf Coast League Braves, Double-A Mississippi Braves, and Triple-A Gwinnett Braves, batting a combined .259/.303/.409 with eight home runs and 21 RBI.

== Coaching career ==
On January 18, 2019, Bowman became the managers of the Dominican Summer League Pirates.

On May 16, 2025, Bowman became the manager of the Indianapolis Indians.

In 2026, Bowman was named as the field coordinator for the Pittsburgh Pirates.
