= Justin Morneau =

Canadian baseball player (born 1981)

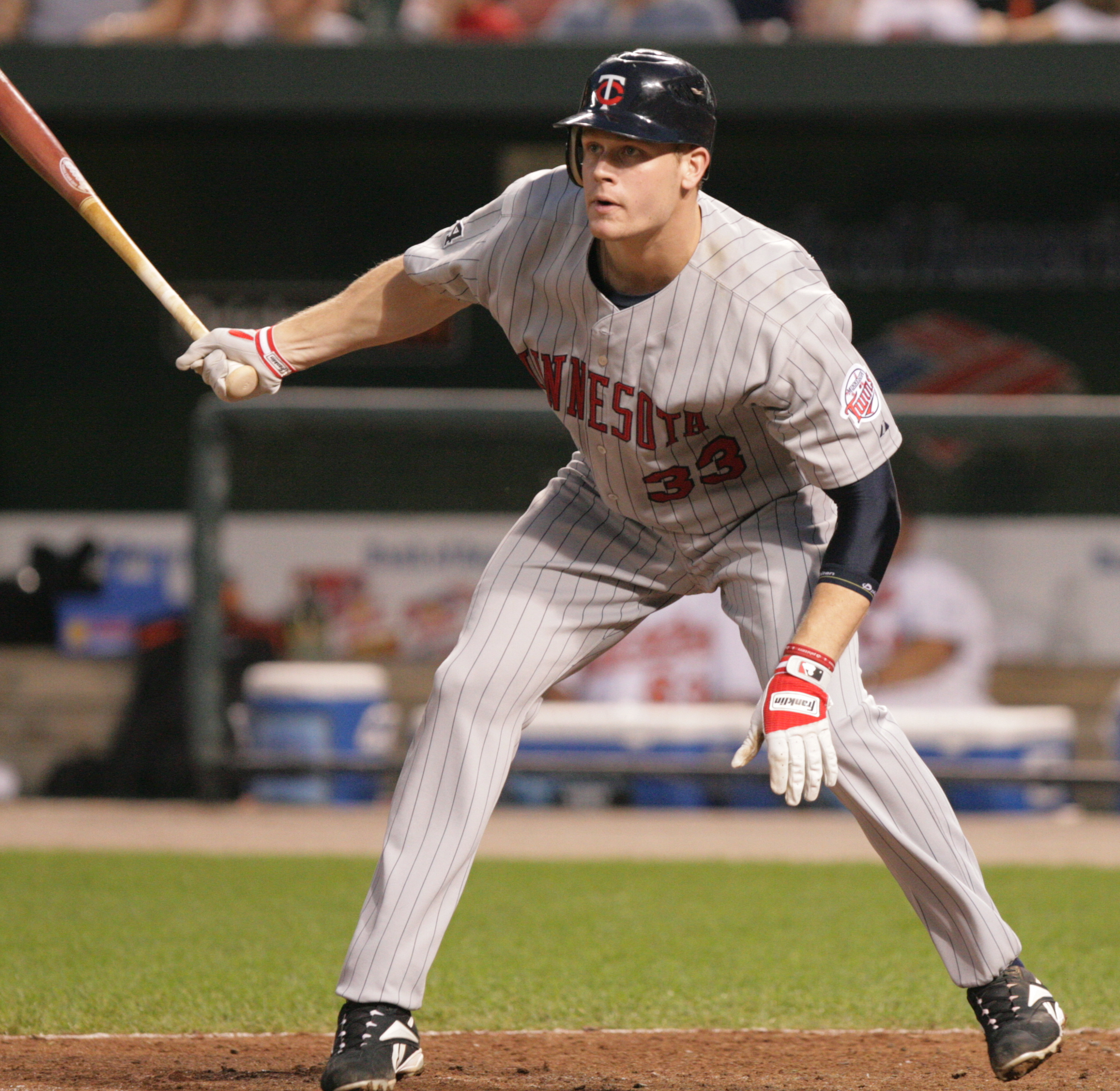
- Morneau with the Minnesota Twins in 2006
- First baseman
- Born: May 15, 1981 (age 45); New Westminster, British Columbia, Canada
- Batted: Left Threw: Right

MLB debut
- June 10, 2003, for the Minnesota Twins

Last MLB appearance
- October 2, 2016, for the Chicago White Sox

MLB statistics
- Batting average: .281
- Home runs: 247
- Runs batted in: 985
- Stats at Baseball Reference

Teams
- Minnesota Twins (2003–2013); Pittsburgh Pirates (2013); Colorado Rockies (2014–2015); Chicago White Sox (2016)

Career highlights and awards
- 4× All-Star (2007–2010); AL MVP (2006); 2× Silver Slugger Award (2006, 2008); NL batting champion (2014); Minnesota Twins Hall of Fame

Member of the Canadian

Baseball Hall of Fame
- Induction: 2020

Justin Ernest George Morneau (born May 15, 1981) is a Canadian former professional baseball first baseman. He played in Major League Baseball (MLB) for the Minnesota Twins, Pittsburgh Pirates, Colorado Rockies, and Chicago White Sox. At 6 feet 4 inches (1.93 m) and 220 pounds (100 kg), Morneau was drafted as a catcher by the Twins in 1999. He converted to first base in the minor leagues and made his MLB debut in 2003. Morneau held that position throughout his career and in 2007 became the first Twin since Gary Gaetti in 1987–1988 to hit 30 home runs in consecutive seasons.

A four-time All-Star, Morneau was named the 2006 American League (AL) Most Valuable Player (MVP), finished runner-up for MVP in 2008, and won two Silver Slugger Awards. Additionally, Morneau won the 2008 Home Run Derby and the 2014 National League (NL) batting title. Internationally, Morneau represented Canada at the 2006, 2009, 2013, and 2017 World Baseball Classic. After retirement from baseball, he was elected to the Minnesota Twins Hall of Fame and currently serves as a Special Assistant in the Twins front office, as well as a color commentator for the team on FanDuel Sports Network North.

== Early life ==
Justin Ernest George Morneau was born on May 15, 1981, in New Westminster, British Columbia, Canada. Morneau is the youngest son of George Morneau, a hitting coach for many softball and baseball teams, childcare worker, and sporting goods store owner. His mother Audra Chartrand was an elementary school teacher and former fast-pitch softball player. Justin has an older brother, Geordie. His father once played hockey for the Brandon Wheat Kings and attended the training camp of the Minnesota North Stars.

Morneau grew up in New Westminster, British Columbia, the historic "Royal City", adjacent to Vancouver, where he played hockey for the local minor team, the New Westminster Royals, and emerged as a star goaltender, playing for teams a year older than he was. He also played baseball in the New Westminster Minor Baseball Association and for the North Delta Blue Jays in the B.C. Premier Baseball League.

Morneau attended Lord Tweedsmuir Elementary School in New Westminster, later transferring to Richard McBride Elementary School, where his mother was a teacher and coach and where he enrolled in a French immersion program. He played basketball and volleyball and ball hockey on the school teams.

Growing up, Morneau was a sports fan, whose favourite athletes included hockey players Patrick Roy, Cam Neely, and Ray Bourque; and baseball players John Olerud, Ken Griffey Jr., Jack Morris and Larry Walker. His favorite NHL team was the Boston Bruins, and his favorite MLB team was the Toronto Blue Jays.

Morneau attended St. Thomas More Collegiate in 1994–95 for his eighth grade year, where he played basketball. Coaches approached him to play for the school's famed football program, based on his athletic ability, but he declined.

Morneau transferred to New Westminster Secondary School and graduated in 1999. He continued to play basketball and hockey while in high school. He was named the New Westminster High School Athlete of the year and was a member of Canadian national champion baseball teams in 1997 and 1998. In 1998, he was selected the best hitter and catcher of the National Championships playing for Team British Columbia.

Morneau was associated with the Portland Winter Hawks of the Western Hockey League; he attended training camp and played one preseason game of Major Junior hockey as a goaltender. Morneau chose his jersey number (33) for goalie Patrick Roy. He is listed as winning the Memorial Cup in 1998 with the Winter Hawks. As Morneau put it, "I was the third goalie. A backup to the backup. If somebody got hurt, I might have gotten out there as a backup. I played in an exhibition game and backed up some regular-season games.". Morneau remained on Portland's Protected Player List until he decided to focus on baseball instead of hockey. According to Winter Hawks assistant coach at the time, Mike Williamson, "He was young and raw — a big guy who covered a lot of the net. I remember a conversation we had with him when recruiting him. We told him he should go to hockey because not many Canadian guys end up going very far and doing very well in baseball. He showed us otherwise."

== Professional career ==
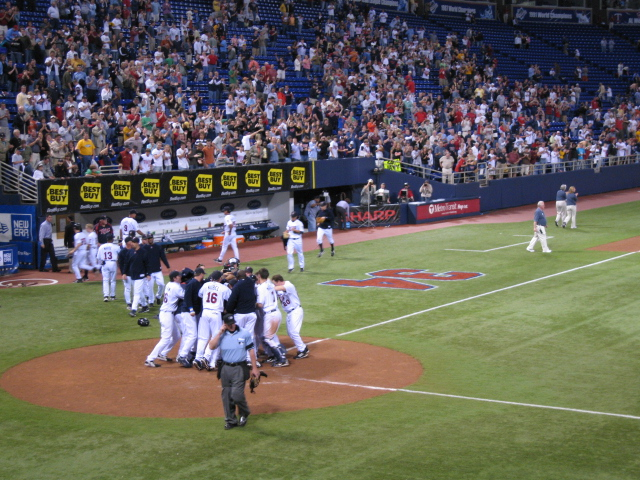
Home run for Morneau, Hubert H. Humphrey Metrodome

=== Draft and minor leagues ===
Morneau did not attend college, despite receiving many attractive offers from NCAA schools. He was selected by the Twins in the third round (89th overall) of the 1999 Major League Baseball draft. He converted to first base in 2001 while playing for the Class-A Quad Cities River Bandits. In six minor league seasons, he hit .310 with 87 home runs, 153 RBI and 122 doubles.

Morneau participated in the 2002 and 2004 All-Star Futures Games, playing for the World teams. He was twice named Eastern League Player of the Week in 2002 (April 22–28 and July 15–21). On September 3, 2002, Morneau was promoted to Minnesota's Triple-A team, the Edmonton Trappers, but did not play in a game for the team that season. He made his first Triple-A appearance in 2003 with the Twins' new affiliate, the Rochester Red Wings, and finished the season batting .268 with 16 home runs and 42 RBI in 71 games.

=== Minnesota Twins (2003–2013) ===
==== Early career (2003–2005) ====
Morneau made his major league debut with the Twins on June 10, 2003 against the Colorado Rockies, batting clean-up. He singled in his first career at-bat off Jason Jennings and went 2-for-4 in the game. A week later on June 17, he hit his first career home run off Kansas City Royals reliever Albie Lopez. Morneau played in 40 games with the Twins in 2003, batting .226 with four home runs and 10 RBI.

In 2004, after Morneau compiled impressive minor league numbers, the Twins dealt veteran first baseman Doug Mientkiewicz to the Boston Red Sox and Morneau became the Twins' starting first baseman. He appeared in 74 games for the Twins in 2004, hitting .271 with 19 home runs and 58 RBI in 280 at bats while committing just three errors.

The 2005 season was a struggle for Morneau, as he dealt with off-season illnesses as well as being hit in the head by a pitch in April. He finished the season with a .239 batting average, 22 home runs and 79 RBI in 141 games. Although he never appeared to fully shake off his early season setbacks, Morneau finished first on the Twins in RBI and second in home runs.

==== Dominance (2006–2009) ====
During Morneau's first three seasons with the Twins, he wore #27. Starting in 2006, he wore #33 for the rest of his Twins career. After a slow start to 2006, Morneau exploded offensively in the months of June, July, and August, raising his batting average nearly 50 points in June after beginning the month hitting .240. He raised his average another 33 points in July and after June consistently appeared near the top of the American League leaderboard in batting average, home runs, and RBI. On August 9, Morneau became the first Twin since 1987 to hit 30 home runs in a single season. He finished the season hitting .321 (seventh in the AL) and slugging .559 (sixth in AL) with 34 home runs and 130 RBI in 157 games. He was second in the league in RBIs and tied Larry Walker's 1997 total for the most RBIs in a season by a Canadian. For his hitting, he won the 2006 American League Silver Slugger Award representing first basemen. His efforts helped the Twins win their fourth division title in five years.

On November 21, 2006, Morneau won the American League Most Valuable Player Award in a close vote over Derek Jeter of the New York Yankees, becoming only the fourth player in Twins history (after Zoilo Versalles, Harmon Killebrew, and Rod Carew) to receive the honour. He became the first Canadian to win the AL MVP award, and the second Canadian to win a major league MVP award (Larry Walker was the first, having won the NL MVP Award in 1997; Walker and Morneau were joined in 2010 by Joey Votto).

In 2007, Morneau played in 157 games, batting .271 with 31 home runs and 111 RBI. In May 2007, Morneau won the Player of the Month in the American League for the first time in his career. Morneau appeared on the cover of the arcade baseball video game The Bigs in Canadian stores and at Best Buy stores in the United States. Morneau was named to the 2007 Major League Baseball All-Star Game roster in 2007 for the first time. He also participated in the 2007 State Farm Home Run Derby for the first time. He was up first and hit four homers and ended up tying with Albert Pujols in the first round. He was subsequently eliminated with only one homer on five chances in a tie-off. Pujols advanced to the second round with two homers. Morneau had his first career three home run game on July 6, 2007, against the Chicago White Sox. He had a solo, a two-run, and a three-run homer. He had an at-bat to try for his fourth home run, but his bat got under the ball, and he flew out to deep left field.

In January 2008, Morneau agreed to a six-year contract extension worth $80 million, which at the time was the longest and richest contract in Twins history until in 2010, teammate Joe Mauer signed an eight-year, $184 million contract. Morneau produced with his new contract, as he played in all 163 of the Twins' games and hit .300 with 23 home runs and 129 RBI.

On July 10, 2008, Morneau tied a career high with five hits in a game as the Twins defeated the Detroit Tigers. He hit what went on to be the game-winning home run to finish the day 5-for-5 with a walk in a 7–6 extra-innings win. Morneau was then announced as a reserve player for the American League in the 2008 Major League Baseball All-Star Game.

Morneau won the 2008 Home Run Derby, defeating Josh Hamilton of the Texas Rangers. He became the first Canadian to win the Home Run Derby. Later during the All-Star event, Morneau scored the winning run for the American League in the MLB All Star Game at Yankee Stadium on a sacrifice fly to right field off the bat of Michael Young. Morneau was awarded the Lionel Conacher Award as the Canadian Press Male Athlete of the Year, joining Ferguson Jenkins and Larry Walker as the only Major League Baseball players to win the award. Morneau finished second in the balloting for AL MVP, as Dustin Pedroia won, and Kevin Youkilis came in third.

In 2009, Morneau batted .274 with 30 home runs and 100 RBI in 135 games. He was selected as a reserve position player at first base for the 2009 All-Star Game, marking Morneau's third selection to the All-Star Game. On September 14, Morneau was officially diagnosed with a stress fracture in his back after a long slump; he missed the rest of the 2009 season and the playoffs.

==== Injuries and struggles (2010–2013) ====
Morneau got off to a strong start in the 2010 campaign, batting .345 with 18 home runs and 56 RBI in 81 games. He also posted a major-league leading .437 on-base percentage and .617 slugging percentage at the All-Star break. For the first time in his career, he was voted in by the fans to start the 2010 All-Star Game at first base, but ended up pulling out from the event after sustaining a concussion on July 7.

Morneau missed the remainder of the 2010 regular season with the effects of post-concussion syndrome. After the Twins clinched the American League Central Division championship, Morneau said that he was finally symptom-free. Morneau said he would be unavailable for the ALDS, but that he hoped to be available for the ALCS should the Twins advance. On October 4, 2010, the Twins announced that Morneau would not return for the 2010 season, regardless of how far the team went in the postseason.

In 2011, the Twins were glad to see Morneau somewhat recovered from his season-ending concussion in the previous season. He was in the Opening Day starting line-up against the Toronto Blue Jays. This did not last long, though, as he missed five games with the flu later in April and a couple of games in June with a sore wrist. He underwent neck surgery in June to correct pinched nerves in his neck, causing him to miss two months from mid-June to mid-August. Just ten days later, he missed two games with a bruised foot. On August 29, 2011, Morneau suffered a left shoulder injury that would lead to mild concussion-like symptoms. These symptoms eventually led to Morneau missing the remainder of the season. In 2011, Morneau appeared in just 69 games collecting just 60 hits, only four of them home runs. He batted a meager .227 with 19 walks and 30 RBI. All of the previous are career lows disregarding his rookie season.

In 2012, Morneau returned as an everyday first baseman for the Twins. Appearing in 134 games, Morneau finished the season with a .257 batting average, 19 home runs and 77 RBI.

Prior to being traded, Morneau played in 127 games for the Twins in 2013. He had nearly matched his total stats for 2012, batting .259 with 17 home runs and 74 RBI.

=== Pittsburgh Pirates (2013) ===
On August 31, 2013, Morneau was traded to the Pittsburgh Pirates in exchange for Alex Presley and a player to be named later, who was later identified as Duke Welker on October 5, 2013. On September 1, 2013 he made his debut with the Pirates, playing first base. He initially wore number 36 but later changed numbers – Morneau wore number 33 in Minnesota, but due to number being retired in Pittsburgh (in honor of Honus Wagner), he simply decided to double it to 66. He batted .260 with 3 RBI in 25 games as a Pirate.

=== Colorado Rockies (2014–2015) ===
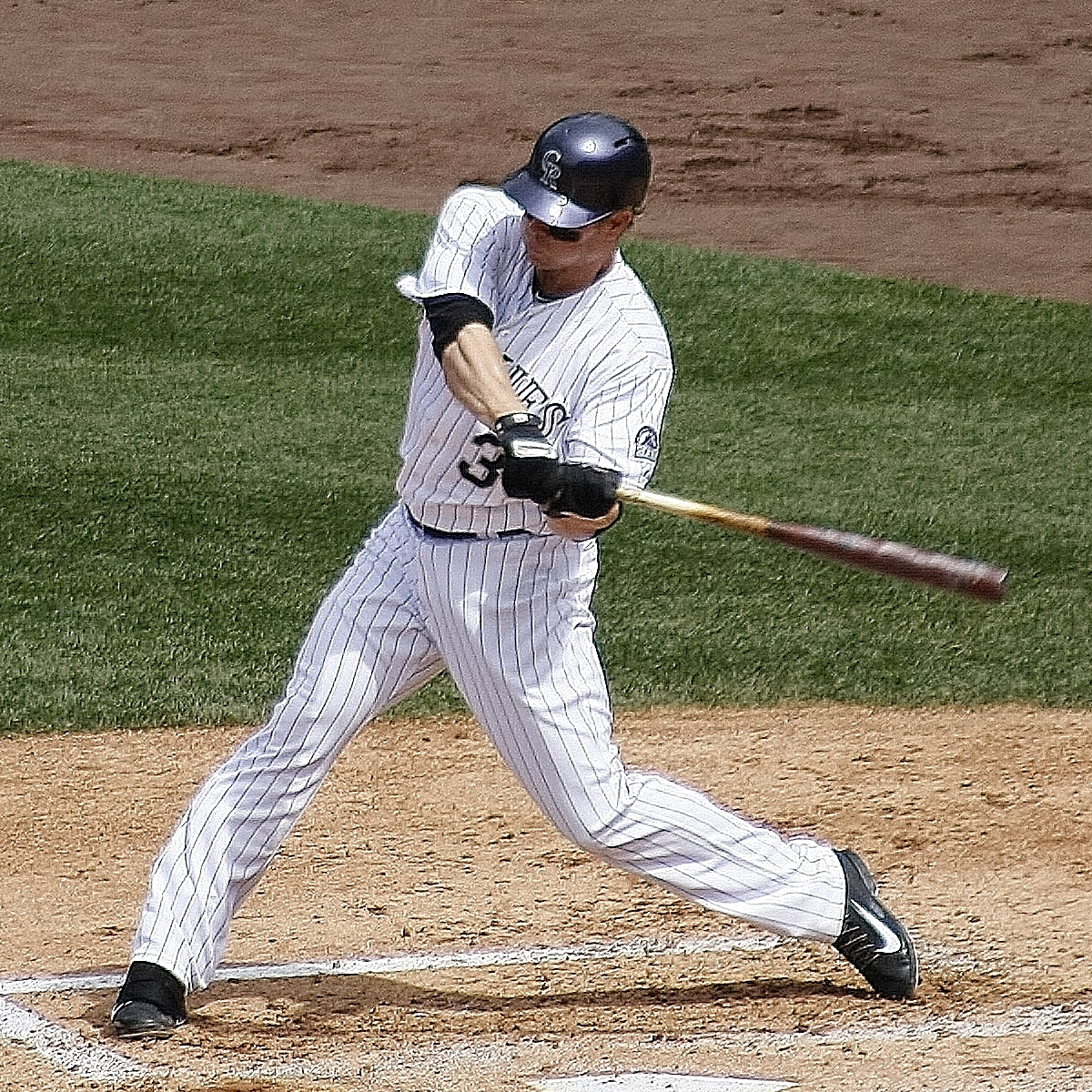
Morneau batting with the Colorado Rockies

On December 3, 2013, Morneau agreed to a two-year, $14 million deal with the Colorado Rockies, pending a physical. The deal became official on December 13. Morneau became the first Rockies player since Larry Walker to wear #33 as it had been out of circulation, but not retired for Walker since he was traded to the St. Louis Cardinals in 2004. Morneau went on to have a solid year in Colorado, batting .319 with 17 home runs and 82 RBI in 135 games. He also claimed the National League batting title, the first batting title of his career. Morneau had a .310 batting average with three home runs and 15 RBI in 49 games with the Rockies in 2015.

=== Chicago White Sox (2016) ===
On June 9, 2016, Morneau signed a one-year, $1 million contract with the Chicago White Sox. He was immediately placed on the 15-day disabled list, and was projected to return after the All-Star break. Due to Zach Duke wearing number 33, Morneau decided to wear number 44 instead. In 58 games with the White Sox, he batted .261 with six home runs and 25 RBI.

=== Career statistics ===
In 1,545 games over 14 seasons, Morneau posted a .281 batting average (1,603-for-5,699) with 772 runs, 349 doubles, 23 triples, 247 home runs, 985 RBI, 573 bases on balls, a .348 on-base percentage and a .481 slugging percentage. He finished his career with a .996 fielding percentage playing at first base. In 13 postseason games, he hit .302 (16-for-53) with eight runs, four doubles, two home runs and 4 RBI.

Morneau was included on the ballot for the National Baseball Hall of Fame class of 2022 when it was announced on November 22, 2021. He received five votes (1.3%), making him ineligible for future ballots.

== Front office and broadcasting career ==
After playing for Canada in the 2017 World Baseball Classic, but spending the 2017 MLB Season as a free agent, Morneau took a job as a special assistant to the Minnesota Twins, functionally ending his playing career. His current roles as special assistant include player drafting and development, spring training instruction, and community outreach. He also serves as a television analyst for the Twins on FanDuel Sports Network North, becoming the team's primary analyst starting in the 2020 season.

== International career ==
Morneau was selected for the Canada national baseball team at the 2006 World Baseball Classic, 2009 World Baseball Classic, 2013 World Baseball Classic, 2017 World Baseball Classic and 2019 WBSC Premier12.

Morneau was also selected for the MLB-All-Stars at the 2014 MLB Japan All-Star Series.

== Personal life ==
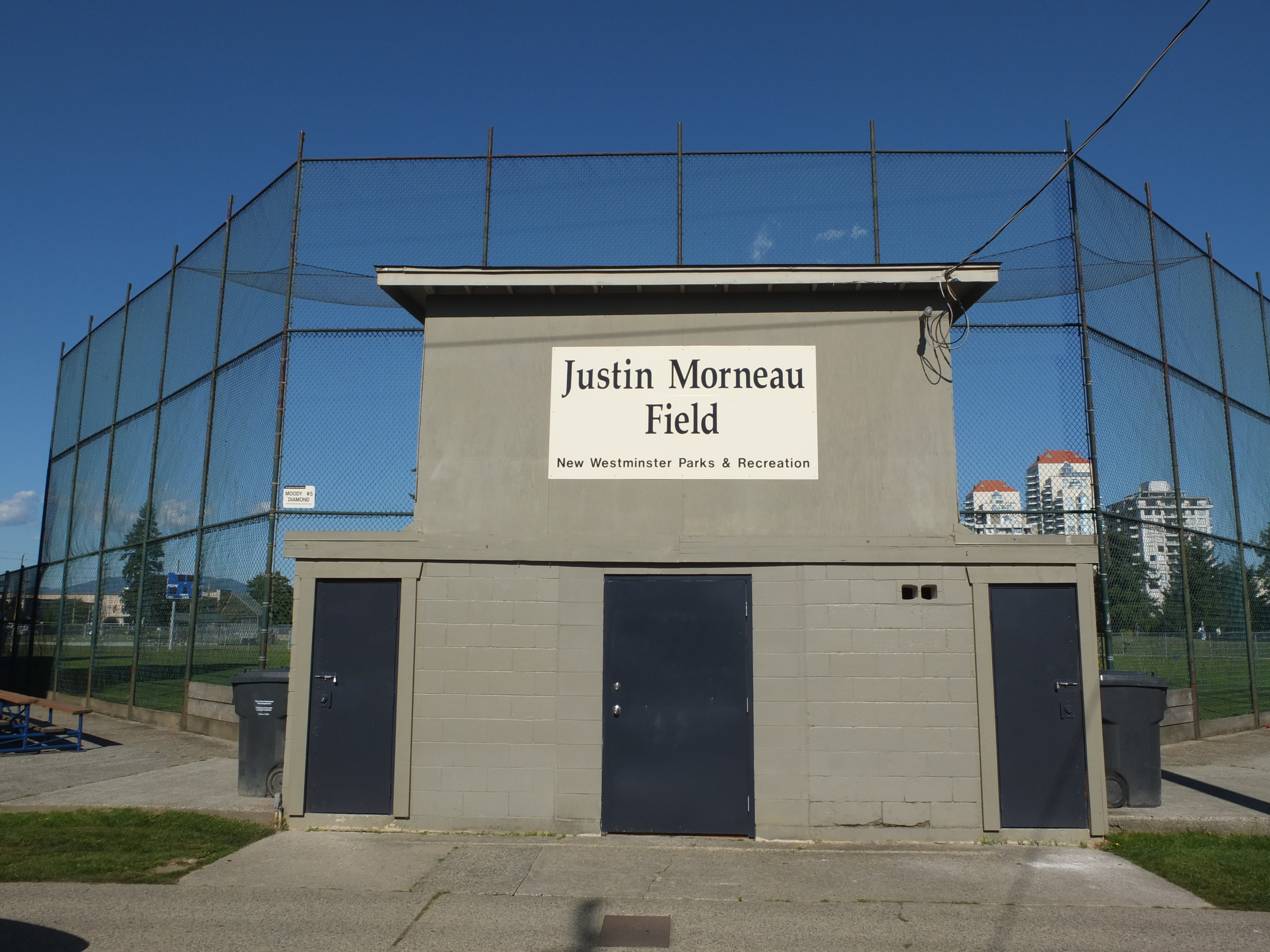
Baseball diamond #5 in Moody Park was named Justin Morneau Field in honor of Morneau on February 2, 2008.

=== Early childhood ===
Morneau's parents divorced when he was seven years old. His mother is a retired teacher and his father works in a warehouse. He has an older brother named Geordie. His mother remarried in 2006 and now Justin has two stepsisters.

=== Marriage and family ===
Morneau married Minnesota native Krista Martin on January 10, 2009, at Landmark Center in St. Paul, Minnesota. The couple have five children.

Morneau purchased a house in his hometown of New Westminster. His house is just four blocks from Queen's Park, where he grew up playing hockey and baseball. As a homesick minor leaguer in Florida, he would log onto a Vancouver radio station online to hear the weather and traffic reports and wonder what his friends were up to back home.

Morneau's family is well known in New Westminster. On February 2, 2008, the city honored him by renaming Moody Park Diamond #5 to Justin Morneau Field. Morneau Field is located just 25 kilometres (16 mi) from a field named for one of Morneau's idols, Larry Walker Field, located in the nearby city of Maple Ridge.

Morneau is superstitious. For much of his career, he wore number 33 to honor his idol, former Colorado Avalanche goaltender Patrick Roy. As a young hockey player, he would refuse to leave the car for hockey games until the clock read :33 minutes past the hour. (He actually appears as an Easter egg in the NHL video game, NHL 2K8, playing his junior position of goaltender.) Morneau had a superstitious routine on game days in Minnesota. Before each home game, Morneau stopped by the same Jimmy John's on Grand Avenue in St. Paul, Minnesota, and ordered the same sandwich from the menu — a Turkey Tom with no sprouts. Later, he drank a slurpee from a slurpee machine in the Twins' clubhouse made of one-half Mountain Dew, one-half red or orange flavor.

The Justin Morneau Foundation was established by Morneau himself and his wife, Krista, to support underprivileged communities with an emphasis on those where the Morneaus have lived.

Over a span of four years (2008–2011), Morneau mailed more than 200 personalized holiday gifts to Twins employees, including to the Target Field grounds crew.

== See also ==
- List of Major League Baseball players from Canada
- List of Major League Baseball career home run leaders

Preceded by Alex Rodriguez	American League Player of the Month; May 2007	Succeeded by Alex Rodriguez
