= British Columbia Premier Baseball League =

Competitive youth baseball league

- Sport: Baseball
- Founded: 1995
- President: Wes Taylor
- No. of teams: 13
- Country: Canada
- Most recent champion: Abbotsford Cardinals
- Most titles: North Shore Twins (7)
- Website: www.bcpbl.com

The British Columbia Premier Baseball League, commonly referred to as the BCPBL or the PBL, is a competitive youth baseball league consisting of 13 teams located throughout British Columbia, Canada.

== League history ==
Known as the Island Premier Baseball League when it was founded in 1995, the league originally included only five teams, all from Vancouver Island: Victoria Investors, Victoria Selects, Mid-Island Canadians, Nanaimo Pirates and the Parksville Royals. Although these five teams had been playing exhibition games against teams from the Lower Mainland, only in 1999 did the league officially expand to include six new teams: North Shore Twins, Vancouver Mounties, Coquitlam Reds, North Delta Blue Jays, White Rock Tritons, and Abbotsford Cardinals.

In 2000, the league expanded once again by adding two more teams: the Whalley Chiefs and Penticton. Later that year, the league changed its name to the British Columbia Premier Baseball league to reflect its new membership.

In 2009, the PBL would again expand, by bringing a team back to Vancouver known as the Vancouver Cannons. In 2010, the PBL board has granted a second PBL franchise to Victoria, known as the Victoria Eagles. Also the team formerly known as the Kelowna Cubs became known as the Okanagan Athletics in the 2010 season.

== Teams ==
Teams	City	Home field	Founded
Abbotsford Cardinals	Abbotsford	Delair Park	1997
Coquitlam Reds	Coquitlam	Mundy Park	1977
Delta Blue Jays	Delta	Mackie Park	1995
Langley Blaze	Langley	Macleod Athletic Park	1999
Mid-Island Pirates	Nanaimo	Serauxmen Stadium	1995
North Island Royals	Parksville	Inouye-Wallace Field	1995
North Shore Twins	North Vancouver	Parkgate Park	1999
Okanagan Athletics	Kelowna	Elks Stadium	2004
UBC Thunder	UBC Vancouver	Tourmaline West Baseball Stadium	2018
Victoria Eagles	Victoria	Lambrick Park	2010
Victoria Mariners	Saanich	Layritz Park	1995
Whalley Chiefs	Surrey	Whalley Stadium	2000
White Rock Tritons	White Rock	South Surrey Athletic Park	1993

== Notable alumni ==
BCPBL alumni who have played Major League Baseball:

- Ryan Dempster (North Shore Twins)
- Jeff Francis (North Delta Blue Jays 1999)
- Taylor Green (Parksville Royals)
- Rich Harden (Victoria Mariners)
- Brett Lawrie (Langley Blaze 2008)
- Adam Loewen (Whalley Chiefs)
- Scott Mathieson (Langley Blaze)
- Justin Morneau (North Delta Blue Jays 1999)
- Aaron Myette (Whalley Chiefs)
- Kevin Nicholson (Whalley Chiefs)
- Tyler O'Neill (Langley Blaze 2013)
- James Paxton (North Delta Blue Jays 2006)
- Nick Pivetta (Victoria Eagles)
- Michael Saunders (Victoria Mariners)
- Rene Tosoni (Coquitlam Reds)
- Larry Walker (Coquitlam Reds), MLB Hall of Famer
- Rowan Wick (Vancouver Cannons and Whalley Chiefs)
- Jared Young (Okanagan Athletics 2013)

BCPBL alumni who have played minor league baseball:

- Cole Armstrong (Whalley Chiefs)
- Shawn Bowman (Coquitlam Reds)
- Leon Boyd (White Rock Tritons)
- Kellin Deglan (Langley Blaze)
- Bryan Dumesnil (Nanaimo Pirates)
- Jordan Lennerton
- Kyle Lotzkar
- Jared Mortensen
- Vince Perkins (Parksville Royals)
- Jimmy Van Ostrand

== Past champions ==
Year	Champion	Runner up	Most Valuable Player
2001	White Rock Tritons	Abbotsford Cardinals	
2002	Nanaimo Pirates	White Rock Tritons	Tyler Williams (North Delta Blue Jays)
2003	White Rock Tritons	Langley Blaze	Devon Franklin (White Rock Tritons)
2004	Victoria Mariners	Coquitlam Reds	Michael Saunders (Victoria Mariners) and Shawn Schaefer (Coquitlam Reds)
2005	Langley Blaze	North Delta Blue Jays	Jordan Padrinao (North Delta Blue Jays)
2006	Langley Blaze	Fraser Valley Chiefs	Alex White (North Delta Blue Jays)
2007	North Shore Twins	Nanaimo Pirates	Sam Armstrong (Coquitlam Reds)
2008	North Shore Twins	Langley Blaze	Oscar Rodriguez (Coquitlam Reds)
2009	North Shore Twins	Fraser Valley Chiefs	Zak Miller (Langley Blaze)
2010	Victoria Mariners	North Delta Blue Jays	Adam Cessford (Victoria Mariners)
2011	Langley Blaze	Coquitlam Reds	Kevin Biro (Parksville Royals)
2012	Okanagan Athletics	North Shore Twins	Aaron Horanski (Langley Blaze)
2013	Victoria Eagles	Nanaimo Pirates	Riley Edmonds (Victoria Eagles)
2014	Langley Blaze	North Shore Twins	Ryan Matsuda (Vancouver Cannons)
2015	North Shore Twins	Nanaimo Pirates	Tyler Duncan (Victoria Eagles) and Matteo Vincelli (North Shore Twins)
2016	Abbotsford Cardinals	Victoria Mariners	Indigo Diaz (Coquitlam Reds) and Nick Seginowich (Victoria Mariners)
2017	North Shore Twins	Parksville Royals	Michael Stovman (Langley Blaze) and Jason Willow (Victoria Mariners)
2018	Abbotsford Cardinals	Langley Blaze	Kayden Beauregard (Abbotsford Cardinals) and Jon Gale (Victoria Mariners)
2019	North Store Twins	Mid Island Pirates	Adam Maier (North Shore Twins)
2021	Langley Blaze	Victoria Eagles	Tom Poole (Langley Blaze)
2022	North Shore Twins	Victoria Eagles	
2023	UBC Thunder	Parksville Royals	
2024	White Rock Tritons	Langley Blaze	Ben McKinnon (White Rock Tritons)
2025	Langley Blaze	Abbotsford Cardinals	
