= 2012 Los Angeles Dodgers season =

2012 Los Angeles Dodgers
- League: National League
- Division: West
- Ballpark: Dodger Stadium
- City: Los Angeles, California
- Record: 86–76 (.531)
- Divisional place: 2nd
- Owners: Frank McCourt (through April 30), Guggenheim Baseball Management (after April 30)
- President: Stan Kasten (after April 30)
- General managers: Ned Colletti
- Managers: Don Mattingly
- Television: Prime Ticket; KCAL-TV (Vin Scully, Eric Collins, Steve Lyons)
- Radio: KLAC (Vin Scully, Charley Steiner, Rick Monday); KTNQ (Jaime Jarrín, Pepe Yñiguez, Fernando Valenzuela)

The 2012 Los Angeles Dodgers season was the 123rd for the franchise in Major League Baseball, and their 55th season in Los Angeles. The Dodgers celebrated the Golden Anniversary of Dodger Stadium, their home since 1962. It was a transitional year as the sale of the team from Frank McCourt to Guggenheim Baseball Management was not finalized until May 1. The new ownership group put their stamp on the team quickly by making a number of big trades and putting more money into the team than McCourt did. After a fast start, the team faded down the stretch and finished eight games behind the World Series Champion Giants. To date, this remains the last year the Dodgers missed the playoffs.

== Offseason ==
=== Ownership situation ===
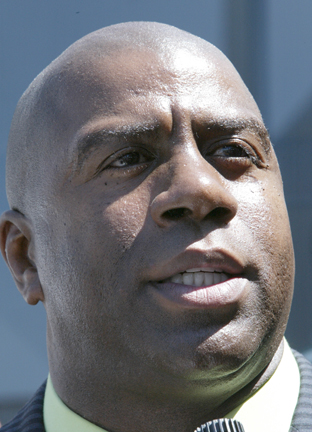
Magic Johnson was part of the ownership group that took over the Dodgers in 2012

The Dodgers muddled ownership situation which had been in question since Frank McCourt's separation from his wife at the end of the 2009 season started to resolve itself. First McCourt and estranged wife Jamie McCourt reached a settlement in their bitter divorce case, in which she gave up her claims on the team for $130 million and then McCourt agreed to a settlement with Major League Baseball in which the team was to be put up for sale in a bidding process with the bankruptcy court. Several groups of potential owners placed bids on the Dodgers, including Magic Johnson and Mark Walter, Steve Cohen, Rick Caruso and Joe Torre, Stanley Gold, Dennis Gilbert and Larry King, Mark Cuban and Orel Hershiser and Steve Garvey.

On March 27, 2012, it was announced that an agreement had been reached on the sale of the Dodgers between Frank McCourt and Guggenheim Baseball Management LLC, a group of investors fronted by Guggenheim CEO Mark Walter and including former Los Angeles Lakers player Magic Johnson, baseball executive Stan Kasten and film mogul Peter Guber. The total sale price for the Dodgers (which includes Dodgers Stadium) exceeded $2 billion, making the sale the largest for a professional sports team in history, exceeding the approximately $1.5 billion purchase of Manchester United F.C. by Malcolm Glazer in 2005, On the same day, it was also announced that the members of the group would partner with McCourt in purchasing the property surrounding the stadium. The sale price of the Dodgers was considered to be far higher than what the team was actually worth at the time of sale. Estimates made by Forbes placed the value of the Dodgers at approximately $1.4 billion, and the winning bid was more than 30% higher than the next highest bid. On April 13, the sale was approved by the bankruptcy court and the deal was finalized on May 1.

=== Coaching staff ===
On September 30, 2011, the Dodgers announced the return of the entire coaching staff for the 2012 season. Dave Hansen, who had previously been hired as an interim hitting coach, was officially promoted to hitting coach.

=== Departing players ===
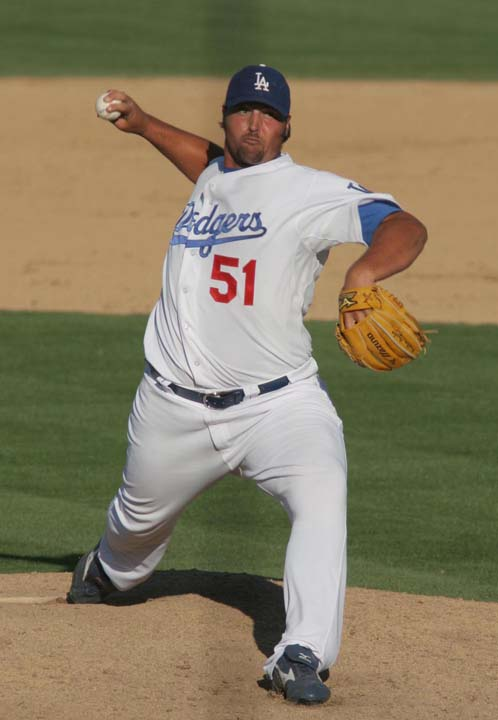
Jonathan Broxton's tenure with the Dodgers ended when he left as a free agent after the 2011 season

The Dodgers got their offseason moves under way on October 4, 2011, when they declined the 2012 options on third baseman Casey Blake and pitcher Jon Garland and outrighted utility player Eugenio Vélez to the minor leagues. The Dodgers other free agents at the end of the 2011 season were pitchers Jonathan Broxton, Hiroki Kuroda, Mike MacDougal and Vicente Padilla, catcher Rod Barajas, infielders Jamey Carroll and Aaron Miles and outfielder Juan Rivera. Outfielder Jamie Hoffmann was claimed off waivers by the Colorado Rockies on December 5. On December 8, the Dodgers traded starting pitcher Dana Eveland to the Baltimore Orioles for two minor leaguers. On December 12, the Dodgers chose not to offer a contract to relief pitcher Hong-Chih Kuo, making him a free agent. Kuo had been the longest tenured Dodger at the time of his release.

=== Player signings ===
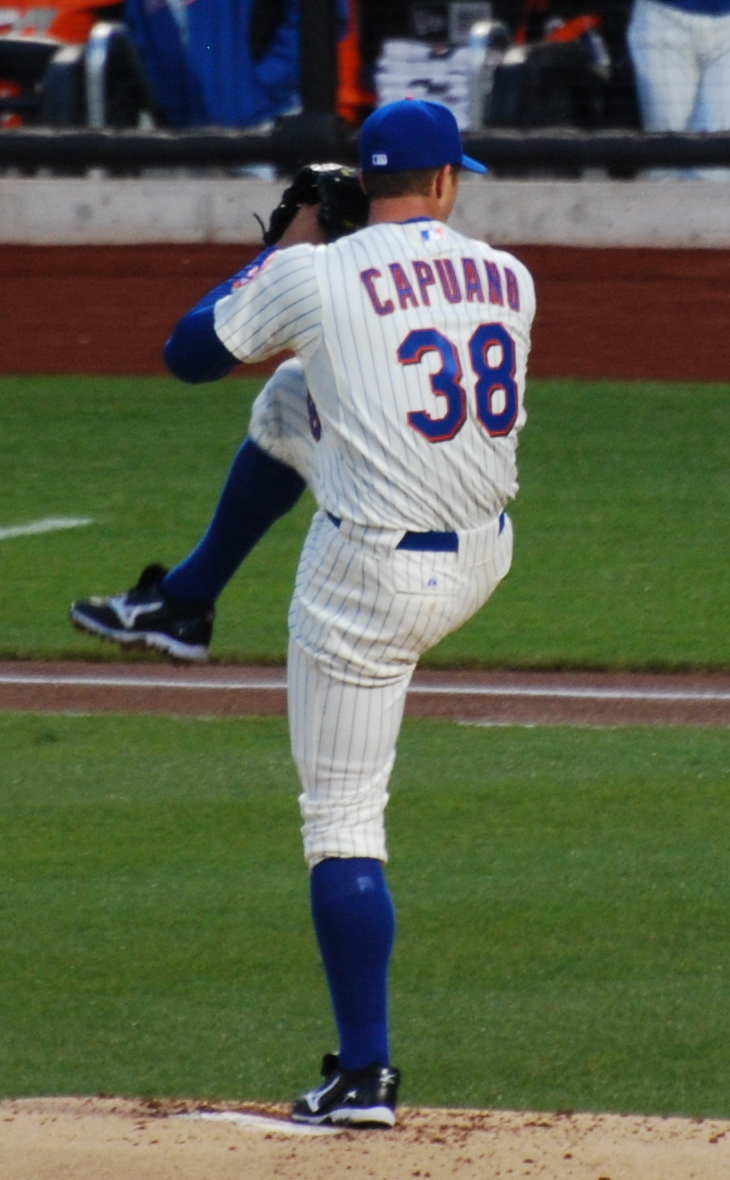
The Dodgers signed Chris Capuano as a free agent during the offseason

The Dodgers re-signed outfielder Juan Rivera to a one-year contract with a 2013 option. They filled two of their open spots in rapid succession on November 15 by signing second baseman Mark Ellis to a two-year contract and backup catcher Matt Treanor to a one-year contract. The Dodgers signed infielder Adam Kennedy to a one-year contract on December 1 to provide some infield depth and they signed veteran starting pitcher Chris Capuano to a two-year contract on December 2 to fill the void left by Kuroda's departure. They added to their bench on December 5 by signing veteran utility player Jerry Hairston Jr. to a 2-year contract. The Dodgers finished their rebuilding of the rotation on December 8 by signing Aaron Harang to a 2-year contract, with a vesting option. The Dodgers chose to re-sign relief pitcher Mike MacDougal, agreeing to a one-year contract (including a 2013 option) with him on January 5. They added another relief pitcher on February 3 by signing veteran Todd Coffey to a one-year contract.

== Regular season ==
=== Season standings ===
==== NL West standings ====
NL West
Team	W	L	Pct.	GB	Home	Road
San Francisco Giants	94	68	.580	—	48‍–‍33	46‍–‍35
Los Angeles Dodgers	86	76	.531	8	45‍–‍36	41‍–‍40
Arizona Diamondbacks	81	81	.500	13	41‍–‍40	40‍–‍41
San Diego Padres	76	86	.469	18	42‍–‍39	34‍–‍47
Colorado Rockies	64	98	.395	30	35‍–‍46	29‍–‍52

==== NL Wild Card ====
Division leaders
Team	W	L	Pct.
Washington Nationals	98	64	.605
Cincinnati Reds	97	65	.599
San Francisco Giants	94	68	.580

Wild Card teams (Top 2 teams qualify for postseason)
Team	W	L	Pct.	GB
Atlanta Braves	94	68	.580	+6
St. Louis Cardinals	88	74	.543	—
Los Angeles Dodgers	86	76	.531	2
Milwaukee Brewers	83	79	.512	5
Philadelphia Phillies	81	81	.500	7
Arizona Diamondbacks	81	81	.500	7
Pittsburgh Pirates	79	83	.488	9
San Diego Padres	76	86	.469	12
New York Mets	74	88	.457	14
Miami Marlins	69	93	.426	19
Colorado Rockies	64	98	.395	24
Chicago Cubs	61	101	.377	27
Houston Astros	55	107	.340	33

=== Opening day lineup ===
Opening Day lineup
Name	Position
Dee Gordon	Shortstop
Mark Ellis	Second baseman
Matt Kemp	Center fielder
Andre Ethier	Right fielder
Juan Rivera	Left fielder
James Loney	First baseman
Juan Uribe	Third baseman
A. J. Ellis	Catcher
Clayton Kershaw	Starting pitcher

=== April ===
The Dodgers opened the 2012 season on April 5, 2012, against the San Diego Padres at Petco Park. Reigning NL Cy Young winner Clayton Kershaw started for the Dodgers, despite suffering from severe flu. He pitched three scoreless innings before being replaced by several relief pitchers. Matt Kemp hit his first home run of the season, a 2-run shot, and the Dodgers won 5–3. The Dodgers won the next game as Chad Billingsley pitched 8 1/3 scoreless innings with 11 strikeouts and Andre Ethier drove in 4 runs in the 6–0 victory. The Dodgers rushed to a 5–0 lead on April 7 but the Padres tied it in the fifth when Dodger pitchers walked five, hit one and issued a wild pitch. The Dodgers managed to win 6–5 in 11 innings. Dee Gordon was the star as he went 3–4 with three stolen bases, two walks and two runs scored as well as bringing home catcher A. J. Ellis with the go-ahead single. After starting the season 3–0 for the first time since 1999, the Dodgers dropped the finale of the 4-game opening series to the Padres 8–4 as new addition Aaron Harang struggled in his season debut.

For their home opener, the Dodgers beat the Pittsburgh Pirates 2–1. Ethier celebrated his 30th birthday by hitting an eighth-inning home run for the deciding run. Kershaw recovered from the flu by allowing only one earned run in seven innings of work, while striking out seven. The Dodgers improved to 5–1 on the season by beating the Pirates 4–1 the next day behind another strong start by Billingsley. The Dodgers beat the Pirates again the next night, 3–2, to complete the sweep of the series. The Dodgers 6–1 record to start the season was their best start since 1981. On April 13, Aaron Harang struck out 9 consecutive batters after giving up a single to set the all time Dodgers record against the Padres. The record was previously held by Johnny Podres with 8 in 1962. The streak was stopped by Will Venable when he hit an opposite field home run. Harang finished one strikeout short of tying Tom Seaver's Major League record of 10 in a row set in 1970 and tied his career high with 13 total strikeouts in the game. The Dodgers won the game 9–8 after the bullpen allowed the Padres to tie the score. The Dodgers continued their hot start by beating the Padres 6–1 behind two home runs by Kemp and one by Ethier. Ted Lilly made his first start of the season and pitched seven dominant innings for the win. The Dodgers swept the Padres with a wild 5–4 win on April 15. After taking a 4–1 lead, partially thanks to Matt Kemp's league leading 6th home run, the Dodgers allowed the Padres to tie the game at 4 heading to the ninth. With two on and no outs in the top of the ninth, Javy Guerra threw the ball inside on Jesús Guzmán, somehow the ball hit his bat and dribbled into fair Territory where A.J. Ellis threw it to third for the start of a triple play, the Dodgers first since 1998. The Padres protested that umpire Dale Scott had signaled that the ball was dead originally before changing his call. In the bottom of the inning, the Dodgers won the game on a walk-off single by Dee Gordon.

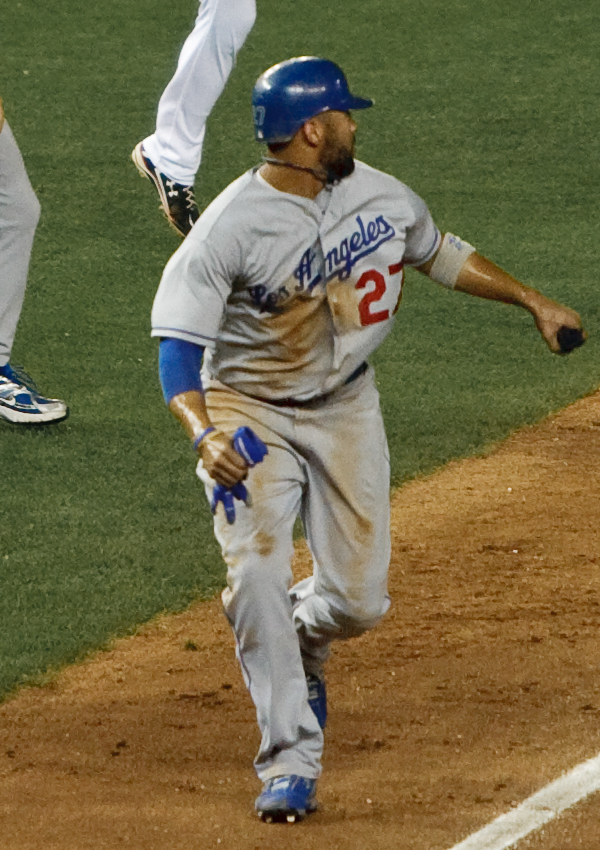
Matt Kemp was the NL Player of the Month for April

The Dodgers opened their next road trip with a 5–4 defeat to the Milwaukee Brewers that snapped the six game win streak. The Brewers won on a walk-off double by George Kottaras off of Javy Guerra in the bottom of the ninth. The Dodgers suffered their second straight defeat in walk-off fashion the next night when Nyjer Morgan scored on a sacrifice fly by Ryan Braun in the bottom of the 10th inning. Matt Kemp hit his seventh home run of the season in the series finale to help the Dodgers avoid the sweep. Two good defensive plays at third base by Jerry Hairston Jr. helped the Dodgers hold on to a 4–3 victory. The Dodgers next traveled to Houston for a matchup with the Astros. In the opener, the one-two punch of Kemp & Ethier again accounted for all the Dodgers runs in a 3–1 victory. Clayton Kershaw picked up his first win of the season in the next game as he struck out nine and only allowed three hits in seven scoreless innings. Kemp hit his ninth home run of the season and James Loney his first in the Dodgers 5–1 win over the Astros. The Dodgers road trip ended on a sour note as they got pounded by the Astros 12–0. Billingsley allowed nine runs in only 3 1/3 innings, including a grand slam home run by Jordan Schafer.

The Dodgers returned home on April 23 and remained undefeated at Dodger Stadium by beating the Atlanta Braves 7–2. Juan Uribe tied a career high with four hits and drove in three runs in the win. They picked up their first home loss of the season the next night, as Martín Prado hit a tie breaking RBI triple off of Javy Guerra in the ninth to set up the Braves 4–3 win. The Dodgers lost again the next night as Guerra gave up three runs in the ninth inning and the Braves came back to win 4–2 despite Matt Kemp's 10th home run of the season, which tied Gary Sheffield's club record for home runs in April set in 2000. The Washington Nationals came to town next and the Dodgers won the opener 3–2 as ace Clayton Kershaw allowed only two runs in eight innings for his 12th straight win at Dodger Stadium. A two-run home run by Andre Ethier accounted for most of the offense. On April 28, Billingsley matched up against Stephen Strasburg and both pitched well, allowing one run each in seven innings of work. 19-year-old 2010 top draft pick Bryce Harper made his Major League debut for the Nationals, crushing a double for his first hit and driving in a run on a sacrifice fly to put the Nationals up in the ninth but the Dodgers came back to tie it in the bottom of the ninth. Matt Kemp crushed a walk-off home run off Tom Gorzelanny for the 4–3 win. It was Kemp's 11th home run of the season, breaking Sheffield's club record. The Dodgers completed the sweep of the Nationals when James Loney's two RBI single backed Chris Capuano's 6 2/3 shutout innings in a 2–0 victory in the finale of the homestand.

The Dodgers ended the month of April in Denver with a road game against the Colorado Rockies. Kemp hit his league leading 12th home run early but the Rockies won 6–2 after Rockies relief pitchers struck out Kemp and Ethier with the bases loaded in the seventh inning. The Dodgers 16 wins in April was their most since the 1984 season.

=== May ===
The month of May ushered in a new era for the Dodgers as the sale of the team by Frank McCourt to Guggenheim Baseball Management was finalized. The Dodgers then won their first game under the new management that night against the Rockies. Ted Lilly worked six strong innings and the Dodgers built a 7–0 lead thanks to homers by Dee Gordon (the first of his career) and Andre Ethier and then held on to win 7–6 after the bullpen allowed the Rockies to catch up. Javy Guerra picked up his eighth save to preserve the win. The Dodgers lost the final game of the series against the Rockies, 8–5, when Jason Giambi hit a walk-off three-run homer against Scott Elbert. Jerry Hairston Jr. fell a double short of the cycle in the opener of a series against the Chicago Cubs on May 4 but the Dodgers still lost 5–4. Chris Capuano pitched seven scoreless innings the next day and the Dodgers ended their brief two-game losing streak with a 5–1 win. Another costly blown save by Javy Guerra cost the Dodgers in the finale, which they lost 4–3 when Jamey Wright walked in the winning run in the 11th inning.

The Dodgers returned home for their first homestand under the new ownership and beat the San Francisco Giants 9–1. The next night, Clayton Kershaw gave up a two-run homer to Brett Pill in the second inning before settling down to pitch eight strong innings, but the Dodgers were unable to get runs in against Ryan Vogelsong and lost 2–1. A three-run pinch hit triple by Tony Gwynn Jr. gave the Dodgers the lead in the series finale against the Giants and they held on to win 6–2. On May 11, Capuano improved his record to 5–0, while allowing just one run on four hits in seven innings. Mark Ellis, Juan Uribe and Andre Ethier provided the offense as each hit a home run in the club's 7–3 win over the Rockies. Aaron Harang allowed just one run in eight innings on May 12 and Tony Gwynn Jr. came through again with a pinch hit RBI to drive in the winning run in the Dodgers 2–1 victory over the Rockies. The Dodgers completed the sweep of the Rockies thanks to a 3-RBI double by Bobby Abreu and a 3-run homer by A. J. Ellis that led the team to an 11–5 win in the series finale. Kershaw pitched seven scoreless innings to outduel Ian Kennedy on May 14, as the Dodgers beat the Arizona Diamondbacks 3–1. Chad Billingsley struggled and the Dodgers had difficulty scoring in the finale of the homestand, losing to the Diamondbacks 5–1 and snapping their five-game winning streak.

With their lineup beset by injuries to key players, the Dodgers started a quick two game road trip to San Diego with a 4–2 loss to the Padres. Aaron Harang pitched seven shutout innings as the Dodgers won big the next night, 8–1.

Back home for a weekend matchup with the NL Central leading St. Louis Cardinals, the Dodgers managed to survive a blown save by closer Kenley Jansen and won in the bottom of the ninth when Fernando Salas walked A.J. Ellis with the bases loaded. The Dodgers won 6–5. Kershaw pitched a complete game shut out on May 19, the fourth of his career, as the Dodgers beat the Cardinals 6–0. Scott Van Slyke hit his first career home run on May 20, a three-run shot in the bottom of the seventh to lead the Dodgers to a 6–5 victory and a sweep of the Cardinals.

The Dodgers beat the Diamondbacks 6–1 on May 22 at Chase Field as their win streak reached five games. Matt Treanor, James Loney and Ethier all homered in the win as Chris Capuano picked up his team leading sixth victory. In the next game, the Dodgers fell behind 6–1 after 6 innings, then rallied for 5 runs of the Arizona bullpen to tie the game in the 7th. Lyle Overbay, who was 4–4 in the game, hit a solo homer in the 8th off Josh Lindblom to put the Diamondbacks back ahead. However the Dodgers went ahead 8–7 thanks to a 2-RBI double by Iván DeJesús Jr. in the top of the ninth off Diamondbacks closer J. J. Putz. Kenley Jansen induced a game ending double play to preserve the Dodgers sixth straight victory. The streak ended the next night, as did Ted Lilly's personal eight-game winning streak, as Lilly was shelled for 8 runs on 9 hits and 5 walks over 3 1/3 innings and the Dodgers were crushed 11–4 by the Diamondbacks.

Back home to play the Houston Astros on May 25, Kershaw allowed a 2-run homer to J. D. Martinez in the third inning and were unable to overcome it in a 3–1 defeat. The following day, L.A. again managed to avoid losing three in a row as A. J. Ellis hit a three-run walk-off homer in a 6–3 victory. The Dodgers beat the Astros on May 27, 5–1 behind Chris Capuano who allowed only two hits in seven innings. Jerry Hairston Jr. had 5 hits in 5 at-bats and backup catcher Matt Treanor homered in the win. The Dodgers bats were silent on Memorial Day as they only scored two runs against Milwaukee Brewers starter Shaun Marcum and lost 3–2. Nathan Eovaldi made his first start for the Dodgers (replacing the injured Ted Lilly) on May 29 and promptly allowed a two-run homer by Ryan Braun in the top of the 1st, which was all the Brewers needed to defeat the Dodgers 2–1. The Dodgers lost their third straight game (for the first time in the 2012 season) when they fell to the Brewers 6–3 the next day. In only his second day back after spending 15 days on the disabled list, Matt Kemp re-injured his left hamstring while scoring in the 1st inning. After receiving the news that Kemp was likely to be out for all of June, the Dodgers meekly lost to the Brewers 6–2 to end the homestand. The series marked the first time the Dodgers were swept in a four-game series at home since 1993 and the first time they were ever swept by the Brewers in any series.

=== June ===
The Dodgers began the month of June where they left off in May, losing their fifth straight game. This time they committed four errors and were pounded by the Colorado Rockies 13–3 at Coors Field. In that game, the Dodgers set a Major League record by having five sons of former Major Leaguers in the lineup at the same time (Tony Gwynn Jr., Jerry Hairston Jr., Iván DeJesús Jr., Dee Gordon and Scott Van Slyke). It was also the first time a starting infield of four major league sons had ever occurred: first baseman Van Slyke, second baseman Hairston, third baseman De Jesus and shortstop Gordon. The losing streak came to an end the next day, when they got a strong pitching performance from Aaron Harang and some timely hitting, including Bobby Abreu's first homer as a Dodger, in a 6–2 win. However, the Dodgers offense went back into hibernation the next day as they dropped the series finale to the Rockies 3–2. The Dodgers road trip continued on June 4 as they traveled to Citizens Bank Park to open a four-game series against the Philadelphia Phillies. Dee Gordon hit a triple to lead off the ninth against Phillies closer Jonathan Papelbon and then scored on a single by Elián Herrera to give the Dodgers the winning margin in the 4–3 victory. Herrera came through the next night as well, hitting a two-RBI double off Cliff Lee in the top of the eighth to give the Dodgers the go-ahead run in a 2–1 victory over the Phillies. Dee Gordon delivered a two-run single during the Dodgers three-run sixth inning on June 6 as they again came from behind to beat the Phillies, this time by a score of 6–5. Kenley Jansen picked up his third save in three days against the Phillies. The Dodgers, helped by three Phillies errors, swept the series with an 8–3 victory in the series finale. The victory was the 100th career win for pitcher Aaron Harang and the team's first ever four-game series sweep in Philadelphia. The Dodgers continued the lengthy road trip with a cross-country flight to Seattle to take on the Mariners in interleague play. In the opener Nathan Eovaldi pitched six scoreless innings before the Mariners got a run off of relief pitcher Scott Elbert. It was all they needed because Kevin Millwood and five relief pitchers combined to pitch a no-hitter against the Dodgers. This was the first official no-hitter against the Dodgers since Kent Mercker of the Atlanta Braves had done it on April 4, 1994. The Dodgers got back into the winning ways the next day as Clayton Kershaw stuck out a season-high 12 batters in 7 innings and Jerry Hairston Jr. hit a home run and had 5 RBI in the 8–3 win. Andre Ethier hit his fourth career grand slam to back Chad Billingsley's strong effort as the Dodgers closed out the lengthy road trip with an 8–2 victory over the Mariners. Billingsley allowed only one run in 7 innings while striking out 8.

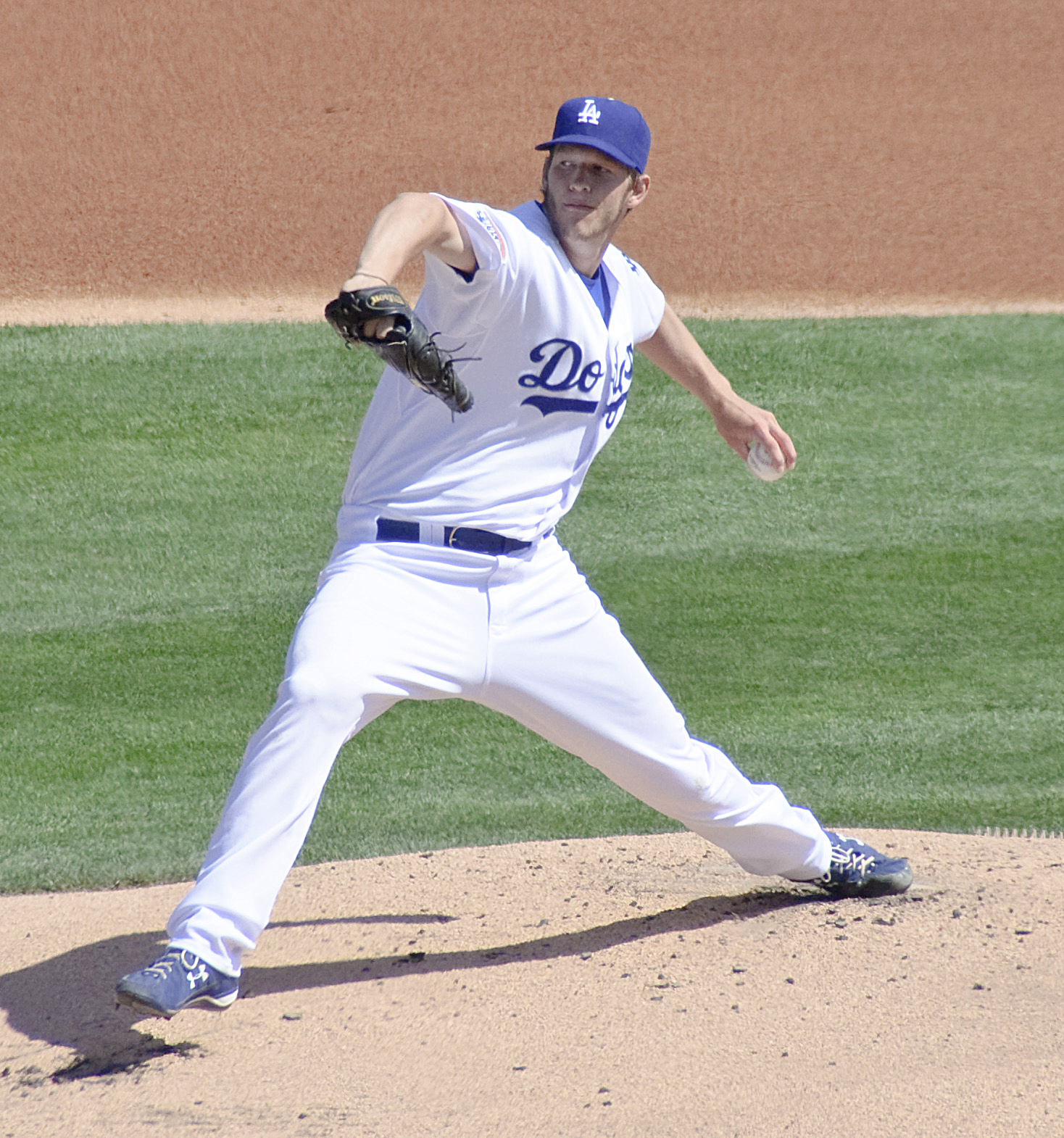
Clayton Kershaw struck out 12 batters in 7 innings on June 9

The Dodgers finally returned home on June 11 only to lose 3–2 to the Los Angeles Angels of Anaheim, led by rookie outfielder Mike Trout, who was 2 for 4 with a home run and two RBI in the game. The Dodgers struggled against Angels starter Jerome Williams the next night, trailing 2–1 heading into the bottom of the eighth. However they battled back as Ethier hit a game-tying single and then Juan Rivera put the Dodgers ahead to stay with a three-run home run. Kenley Jansen picked up his 10th save in the 5–2 victory. The Angels took the final game of the series as Erick Aybar hit a tie-breaking home run off Jansen in the top of the ninth to give them the 2–1 win over the Dodgers. In the next game, on June 15 against the Chicago White Sox, Kershaw struggled, giving up 5 runs in his 6 innings of work but the Dodgers came back and won the game 7–6 thanks to a wild pitch by reliever Matt Thornton that pushed across the eventual winning run. The Dodgers again fell behind early the next day, then came back to tie the game. However, this time they lost 5–4. Chris Capuano struck out 12 in 8 innings of the series finale on Father's Day but left the game down 1–0. The Dodgers rallied to tie the game in the bottom of the 9th and won in the 10th after a triple by Tony Gwynn Jr. and a walk off single by Dee Gordon.

Back on the road, the Dodgers were shut out by Oakland Athletics starter Brandon McCarthy and Aaron Harang struggled, walking 8 batters in only 4 innings and allowing 3 runs in the 1st which was all Oakland needed in the 3–0 victory. The Dodger offense continued to stumble the following day, losing again to Oakland, this time by a score of 4–1. Clayton Kershaw allowed only one run on three hits in eight innings in the finale but the Athletics still swept the Dodgers thanks to a walk-off home run by Yoenis Céspedes off Josh Lindblom in the bottom of the ninth that gave them a 4–1 win. The Dodgers traveled to Anaheim to begin another series with the Angels on June 22. They took an early 5–0 lead, partially thanks to a 3-run homer hit by Bobby Abreu, but lost the game 8–5 to extend their losing streak to four games. The Dodgers ended their skid and picked up a win the next day as Chris Capuano allowed only one run in 7 innings to pick up his ninth win and Dee Gordon was 2–4 with a triple, a stolen base and 2 runs scored in the Dodgers 3–1 win over the Angels. The Dodgers dropped the finale of the Freeway Series when they lost 5–3. This continued the Angels streak of beating the Dodgers in interleague series that has continued since 2006. The Dodgers next traveled to San Francisco for a divisional series against the second place Giants. However, rookie Nathan Eovaldi struggled, allowing 7 runs in the first 2 innings and 8 total in his 5 innings of work and the Dodgers lost 8–0 to see their lead over the Giants in the division drop to 2 games. Clayton Kershaw allowed only 2 runs against the Giants the next day, but the team was again shut down offensively (this time by Ryan Vogelsong) as they lost 2–0. This was the first time the Dodgers had been shut out in back-to-back games against the Giants since 1987. The Dodgers woes continued the next day as they were shut out 3–0 by Tim Lincecum and the Giants. The Dodgers, who were shut out in 3 straight games in the series and fell into a tie with the Giants for first place in the division, extended their scoreless streak to 30 innings. This was the first time one team had thrown three straight shutouts against the Dodgers since the 1937 Boston Braves did it to the Brooklyn Dodgers.

The Dodgers scoreless streak eventually reached 33 innings, fifth longest in team history and the longest since 2004 before they finally scored a run in the 4th inning against the New York Mets in the 1st game of a homestand. However, it was not enough as they lost 3–2 to the Mets, extending the losing streak to 5 games and dropping them out of first place for the first time since April 11. The swoon continued the next day as the Dodgers were dominated by R. A. Dickey and his knuckleball and were shut out again, 9–0. This was the Dodgers sixth straight loss, the longest losing streak since September 2010. On June 30, it was Johan Santana's turn to hold the Dodgers scoreless as he allowed only 3 hits in 8 innings and the Dodgers lost again 5–0 for their seventh straight loss, the longest losing streak since August 2008. They ended the month of June by scoring runs in only one of the last 57 innings they played.

=== July ===
The Dodgers ended their skid as the month turned to July. Clayton Kershaw allowed only one earned run in 7 innings, while striking out 9 and the Dodgers took advantage of 3 Mets errors to pull off an 8–3 victory. Dee Gordon was 2 for 5 with 3 steals and 2 errors in the game. The Dodgers relapsed the next day as the Cincinnati Reds beat them 8–2 for Chad Billingsley's fourth straight loss. The Dodgers came from behind to beat the Reds the next day, as Luis Cruz, just called up from the minors a few days before, doubled in the tie-breaking run in the seventh inning and stole home for the insurance run in the 3–1 win. On the Fourth of July, Aaron Harang allowed only one run in seven innings to record his first victory since June 7 and the Dodgers won the series with a 4–1 victory in the finale.

The Dodgers opened up a four-game series with the Arizona Diamondbacks at Chase Field on July 5. Nathan Eovaldi earned his first win of the year after 5 loses when he allowed only one run in 6 innings. Solo homers by Scott Van Slyke and Elián Herrera led the offense as the Dodgers won 4–1. Kershaw struggled in the next game, allowing 5 runs to score in the 6th inning as the Dodgers fell to the Diamondbacks 5–3. Same story the next day as the Diamondbacks also beat Chad Billingsley 5–3. This was Billingsley's fifth straight loss, a new career high. The Dodgers limped into the All-Star break as they dropped the finale to the Diamondbacks 7–1.

The Dodgers began the second half of the season with the return of injured stars Matt Kemp (out since mid-may with a hamstring injury) and Andre Ethier (out for two weeks with a strained oblique). A solid performance by Kershaw and Mark Ellis two-run homer propelled them to a 2–1 win over the San Diego Padres at Dodger Stadium. The next night, the Dodgers led going into the ninth but Everth Cabrera stole hole against closer Kenley Jansen to tie the game and Will Venable scored the winning run when Jansen's throw to the plate went wide of catcher A. J. Ellis. The final score was 7–6. A season high five errors, include two in the decisive seventh inning by Jerry Hairston Jr. led to six unearned runs in the Padres 7–2 victory over the Dodgers on July 15. Home runs by Jimmy Rollins and Ryan Howard sent the Dodgers to a 3–2 loss to the Philadelphia Phillies. A sore arm prevented Chad Billingsley from making his next start, on July 17, so the Dodgers called up Stephen Fife from the minors to make his Major League debut. Fife pitched well, allowing only 1 run in 6 innings, but the bullpen faltered and the team lost 3–2 for the second straight day. The team picked up a win in the series finale the next day as Matt Kemp hit his first home run since April 30, a two-run walk-off blast in the bottom of the 12th to give the Dodgers a 5–3 victory.

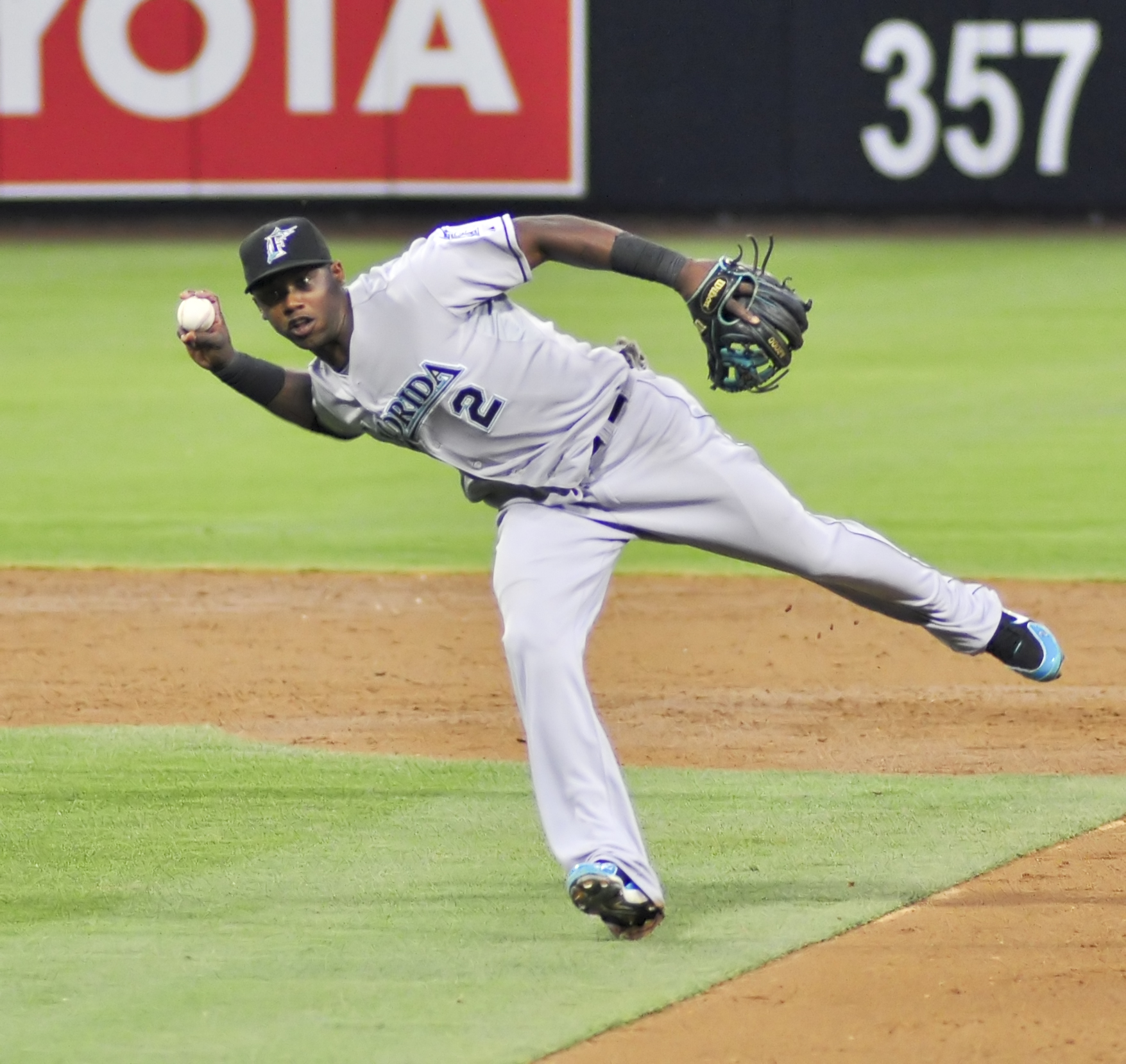
Hanely Ramírez was acquired by the Dodgers in a trade with the Marlins on July 25

The Dodgers began their first road trip of the second half of the season in New York City against the Mets on July 20. Kemp and Luis Cruz each slugged two-run homers off Mets starter Johan Santana and the team held on for a 7–6 victory. Juan Uribe, who had struggled in the first half of the season, broke out in the next game, with a homer, double, two walks, four RBI and three runs scored. Chris Capuano picked up his team leading 10th win in the 8–5 victory. Matt Treanor's pinch hit two-run single in the top of the 12th inning led the Dodgers to an 8–3 victory over the Mets on July 22. The win completed the Dodgers first 3-game series sweep of the Mets in New York since 2002 and gave rookie Josh Wall the win. Wall was the first Dodger to pick up a win in relief in his first appearance since Tim Belcher in 1987. Billingsley came off the disabled list to pitch six solid innings in the Dodgers 5–3 win over the St. Louis Cardinals on July 24. Luis Cruz's three-run homer was main offense in the game. Kershaw struggled in the next game, allowing 8 earned runs, in the Dodgers 8–2 loss to the Cardinals that ended the five-game winning streak. The Dodgers acquired Hanley Ramírez from the Miami Marlins in a trade on July 25 and Ramírez went 2-for-4 with a triple in his Dodgers debut against the Cardinals. It wasn't enough, however, as ex-Dodger Rafael Furcal hit a two-out single to left in the bottom of the 12th to give the Cardinals a 3–2 victory. Chris Capuano turned in his worst start of the season in the finale against the Cardinals, as the Dodgers lost 7–4. Ramírez hit his first home run as a Dodger in the opener of a key series against the division leading Giants. The two-run homer, in the top of the 10th inning was the difference in a 5–3 victory. The Dodgers picked up another win against their rivals the next day as Chad Billingsley pitched 7 1/3 scoreless innings while allowing only 4 hits and Matt Kemp went 4 for 5 with two doubles and a home run in the 10–0 rout. Kershaw pitched a five-hit complete-game shutout to complete the Dodgers sweep of the Giants, 4–0, and move them back into a tie for first place in the division.

The Dodgers returned home on July 30, but Aaron Harang had a poor day, allowing a three-run home run by Paul Goldschmidt and a grand slam by Chris Johnson as the Dodgers lost 7–2. Home runs also caused a problem for Chris Capuano, including a two-run homer by Goldschmidt and a three-run blast by Miguel Montero as the Dodgers closed out July with an 8–2 loss.

=== August ===
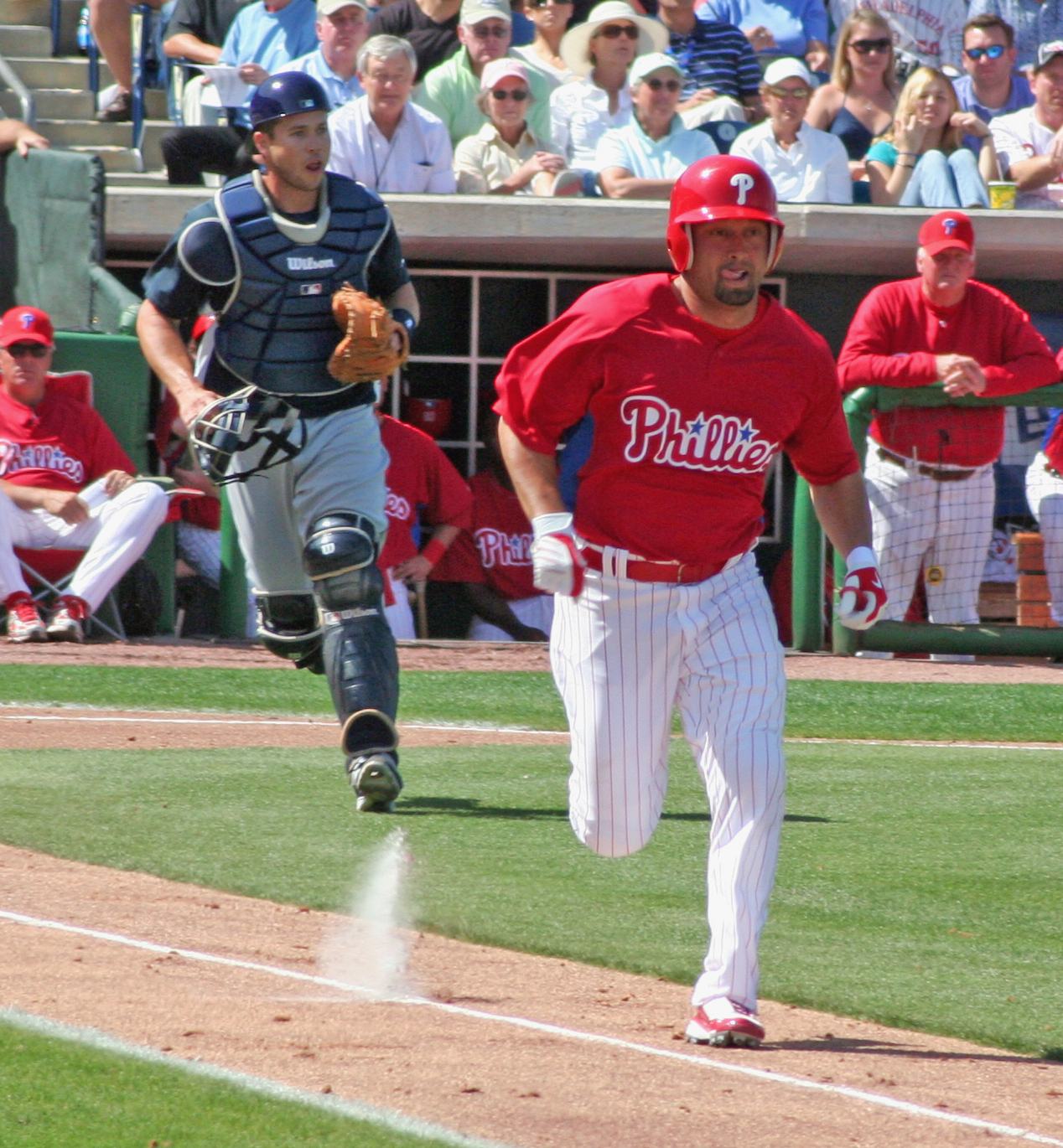
Shane Victorino was acquired in a trade with the Phillies on July 31

The Dodgers acquired Shane Victorino from the Philadelphia Phillies at the trade deadline but it wasn't enough as they were held to 2 hits and 0 runs by Patrick Corbin and the Diamondbacks in a 4–0 defeat to start August. Chad Billingsley allowed only 1 run in 7 innings, while striking out 7 and A. J. Ellis hit two home runs (the first multi-homer game of his career) as the Dodgers beat the Chicago Cubs 6–1 on August 3. Clayton Kershaw followed the next day by pitching seven innings of one run, three-hit ball and picked up the win 3–1. Matt Kemp's two-run homer in the 4th inning sparked the offense. The Dodgers acquired Joe Blanton in a trade with the Phillies on August 3 and he made his Dodger debut on August 5 in the finale against the Cubs. The Dodgers completed the sweep with a 7–6 win, thanks to a walk-off single by Hanley Ramírez. However, they were shut out the next night by the Colorado Rockies 2–0. The Dodgers offense remained in hibernation for another day as the Rockies beat them 3–1 on August 7. The homestand ended with a 6–4 win by the Dodgers. Matt Kemp hit a three-run homer in the 1st inning, Victorino was 3-for-5 with three runs scored and Billingsley picked up his 4th straight victory.

The Dodgers next traveled to Miami to begin their road trip with a 3-game series against the Marlins. In his first game back since his trade to the Dodgers, Hanley Ramírez was 3 for 5 with 2 RBI and Juan Rivera homered as Kershaw picked up his 10th win of the season in the 5–2 victory. on August 11, the Dodgers left the bases loaded in each of the first two innings and left 10 men on base the whole game as the Marlins scored 4 in the 5th off Joe Blanton to beat the Dodgers 7–3. Chris Capuano did not allow a hit until the 7th inning in the series finale and left the game after 8 innings with only two hits and no runs allowed, as well as 10 strikeouts. The Dodgers won 5–0 as Ramírez drove in 3 runs against his former team. Shane Victorino homered and drove in 3 runs to lead the Dodgers to a 5–4 victory over the Pittsburgh Pirates on August 13. The next night, Billingsley pitched eight shutout innings and Luis Cruz was 3 for 5 with 3 RBI in the Dodgers 11–0 rout of the Pirates. The Dodgers moved back into sole possession of first place for the first time since July 13, when Kershaw pitched 8 solid innings (3 runs, 8 strikeouts, no walks) and the team racked up a season-high 15 hits in a 9–3 win. Matt Kemp and Don Mattingly were both ejected in the 2nd inning of the Dodgers 10–6 loss to the Pirates on August 16. The Dodgers spoiled a strong start from Capuano on August 17 when Ronald Belisario allowed the tying runs in the eighth inning and Juan Francisco hit a walk-off single off Jamey Wright in the 11th inning to lead the Atlanta Braves to a 4–3 win. Mattingly was suspended for the final two games of the Braves series as a result of his argument with the umpires in the final game of the Pirates series. With bench coach Trey Hillman leading the team as acting manager, the Dodgers only managed 4 hits against the Braves, but all of them were home runs. Hanley Ramírez hit two of the homers, and drove in 4 of the runs in the process for the 6–2 victory. The Dodgers wrapped up the road trip with a 5–0 win over the Braves. Billingsley pitched seven shutout innings in the game.

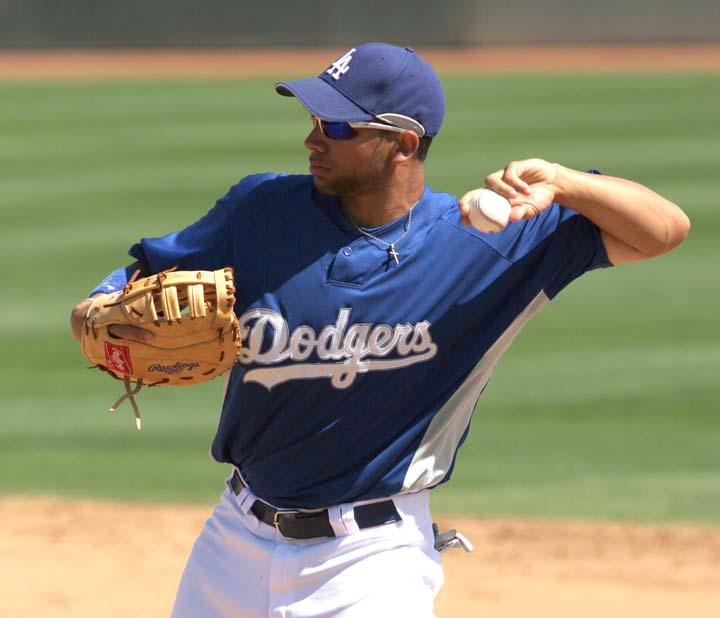
James Loney hit just .254 with the Dodgers in 2012 and was traded to Boston on August 25 after 7 seasons in Los Angeles

The Dodgers returned home from the long road trip for a key divisional series with the San Francisco Giants. In the first game of the series, Kershaw allowed only two runs in 8 innings while striking out 10 but it wasn't enough as Madison Bumgarner also struck out 10 in 8 innings, but didn't allow any runs. The Dodgers lost 2–1 to fall back behind the Giants in the divisional race. The Dodgers also dropped the next game, 4–1, as Tim Lincecum shut down the Dodgers offense and Joe Blanton struggled. The Giants again pounced on the Dodgers early in the series finale, scoring 3 runs in the top of the 1st and coasting to an 8–4 victory that dropped the Dodgers 2 1/2 games back in the division. This was the Giants first three-game series sweep over the Dodgers at Dodger Stadium since 2007. The Dodgers made up for the drought against the Giants by scoring runs in bunches against the Marlins and former teammate Nathan Eovaldi. Juan Rivera, Andre Ethier and Hanley Ramírez all homered in the 11–4 win. The Dodgers and Boston Red Sox made a trade on August 25, considered by many to be the "biggest August trade in MLB history" which sent James Loney and four minor leaguers to the Red Sox for Adrián González, Josh Beckett, Carl Crawford and Nick Punto. González made a huge splash with his new team, smashing a three-run home run off Marlins ace Josh Johnson in his first at-bat with his new team. The Dodgers offense did not look back, running up 16 hits in the 8–2 win. Andre Ethier got his tenth straight base hit, breaking the L.A. Dodger record set by Ron Cey in 1977 and tying the franchise record set by Ed Konetchy in 1919. The Marlins hit four home runs off the Dodgers the next day to win the series finale 6–2. Giancarlo Stanton hit home runs in each game of the series for the Marlins.

Beckett made his Dodgers debut in the opener of a series against the Colorado Rockies at Coors Field. He allowed 3 runs in 5 2/3 innings and struck out 6, but the Dodgers offense was shut out completely and the bullpen blew up in a 10–0 loss. Kemp injured himself by crashing into the center field wall in the 1st inning and had to leave the game, Capuano allowed 4 runs in the first and the Dodgers new look offense continued to struggle as they lost 8–4 on August 28. The Dodgers offense finally came alive the next day, jumping to a 10–1 lead thanks to a 2-run homer by Hanley Ramírez, a grand slam by A. J. Ellis and 7 1/3 solid innings from Joe Blanton. The bullpen faltered in the seventh and eighth by the Dodgers held on to win 10–8.

The Dodgers returned home on August 30 to play the Arizona Diamondbacks. Ian Kennedy and three relievers held the Dodgers scoreless and Kershaw allowed one 2-run homer by Chris Young and that was all they needed as the Diamondbacks beat the Dodgers 2–0. The team dropped to 4 1/2 games behind the Giants, their largest deficit of the season. Reliever Matt Guerrier allowed a solo homer to Jason Kubel in the 11th inning on August 31, to give the Dodgers a 4–3 loss, their eighth straight loss to the Diamondbacks on the season.

=== September ===
The Dodgers finally beat the Diamondbacks on September 1 as Josh Beckett only allowed one run in 6 2/3 innings, while striking out 9, tying his season high. Andre Ethier and Hanley Ramírez each hit solo homers to account for the 2–1 victory. The Dodgers finished off the series with another win, thanks to a two-run walk-off double by Adrián González off Diamondbacks closer J. J. Putz for the 5–4 win. The Dodgers won again the next night against the San Diego Padres as Ethier hit a solo homer in the bottom of the ninth to tie the game and A. J. Ellis hit a walk-off single in the bottom of the 11th for the 4–3 victory. Clayton Kershaw only allowed one run in 7 innings on September 4, while striking out 9. Kerhsaw became just the fifth Dodgers pitcher to post three straight 200 strikeout seasons (Sandy Koufax, Don Drysdale, Fernando Valenzuela and Hideo Nomo). Ethier hit a solo homer in the second inning for his 1,000th career hit but it wasn't enough as Matt Guerrier gave up a two-run game-tying homer in the eighth and John Ely allowed three runs to score in the 11th as the Dodgers lost to the Padres 6–3. The Dodgers lost the series finale as well, 4–3, to the Padres.

The Dodgers next started a key series against the San Francisco Giants at AT&T Park, hoping to make up ground in the standings. However, they dropped the opener of the series 5–2. They evened the series the next day as Adrián González tripled in the eighth inning and scored on a double by Hanley Ramírez for the key run in a 3–2 victory. However, the team fell 5 1/2 games behind the Giants when Barry Zito shut them out the next day, 4–0. On September 11, Kershaw only allowed three hits and one unearned run against the Arizona Diamondbacks but it was too much as Ian Kennedy blanked the Dodgers 1–0. The Dodgers actually scored first the next night, Adrián González double scored two runs to give the Dodgers an early lead... but Trevor Cahill shut them down the rest of the game and the Diamondbacks came back to win 3–2.

The Dodgers returned home on September 13 to open up a series against the St. Louis Cardinals, who held a one-game lead over them in the wild card race to start the series. However, they continued to struggle offensively and dropped the game 2–1. The Dodgers dropped behind 4–1 in the next game, but fought back to win 8–5 thanks to home runs by Ethier and Luis Cruz, ending their four-game losing streak. Trailing by one run entering the ninth on September 15, Luis Cruiz RBI double and Juan Rivera's pinch hit walk off single, both off Cardinals closer Jason Motte, gave the Dodgers a 4–3 win and moved them into a tie with the Cardinals for the final Wild Card spot. However, they dropped the last game of the series, in 12 innings, 5–2.

The Dodgers next began a key road trip against the two teams with the best records in the National League, the Washington Nationals and Cincinnati Reds. The opener of their series against the Nationals was rained out, forcing them to play a double-header on September 19. In the first game, the bats continued to be non-existent as they lost 3–1. In the second game, Josh Beckett was brilliant for 7 innings as they Dodgers built a 6–0 lead, only to see the bullpen falter in the 8th and the Nationals tied the game. Matt Kemp homered in the top of the ninth to provide the crucial run in the 7–6 victory. They closed out the series the next day with a 4–1 loss, dimming their post-season hopes. The Dodgers beat the Reds on September 21, thanks to a 2-RBI single by Kemp in the top of the 10th inning. Mat Latos shut down the Dodgers the next day, for a 6–0 Reds victory. Clayton Kershaw made the start on September 23, his first start since in 12 days since suffering a hip injury. Kershaw allowed only one run in 5 innings and Adrián González hit two home runs, to lead the Dodgers to a 5–3 victory over the Reds. The Dodgers, with their season hanging by a thread, next traveled to San Diego for a series with the Padres. They dropped the first game of the series 2–1. Kemp had four hits, including a home run the next night as the Dodgers offense finally showed some life and they beat the Padres 8–2. The Dodgers finished off their last road trip of the season with an 8–4 victory over the Padres, with both A.J. Ellis and Luis Cruz driving in 2 runs in the game.

Trailing by 3 games in the Wild Card race with 6 games remaining, the Dodgers returned home on September 28 to play the Colorado Rockies. Clayton Kershaw struck out 10 in 8 scoreless innings and Shane Victorino hit a three-run homer in the 2nd inning as the Dodgers won 8–0. The Dodgers scored 8 runs in their third straight game, the first time they had done that since July 8–14, 2007. Matt Kemp hit 2 home runs on September 29 and Joe Blanton and 3 relievers combined to shut out the Rockies 3–0. The win, coupled with the Cardinals losing a game to the Nationals, moved the Dodgers to 2 back in the Wild Card race with 4 games remaining. The Dodgers finished off the sweep of the Rockies with a 7–1 win. Kemp, A.J. Ellis and Cruz all homered in the win.

=== October ===
The Dodgers began their final series of the regular season on October 1 against the San Francisco Giants. In the opening game, they kept their slim post-season chances alive with a walk-off single by Elián Herrera to beat the Giants 4–2. Andre Ethier hit his 20th home run earlier in the game. The Dodgers hopes were extinguished the next day as they dropped the game to the Giants 4–3 and were eliminated from the postseason contention. The Dodgers ended their season on October 3 with a 5–1 win over the Giants. Clayton Kershaw struck out 8 in his 8 innings of work and finished the season with a Major League best 2.53 ERA and 229 strikeouts, second in the league.

=== Game log ===
Legend
	Dodgers win
	Dodgers loss
	Postponement
**Bold**	Dodgers team member

2012 Game Log
April (16–7)

#	Date	Opponent	Score	Win	Loss	Save	Attendance	Record
1	April 5	@ Padres	**W** 5–3	**Lindblom** (1–0)	Vólquez (0–1)	**Guerra** (1)	42,941	1–0
2	April 6	@ Padres	**W** 6–0	**Billingsley** (1–0)	Luebke (0–1)		32,490	2–0
3	April 7	@ Padres	**W** 6–5 (11)	**Coffey** (1–0)	Bass (0–1)	**Guerra** (2)	31,909	3–0
4	April 8	@ Padres	**L** 4–8	Richard (1–0)	**Harang** (0–1)		19,021	3–1
5	April 10	Pirates	**W** 2–1	**Jansen** (1–0)	Grilli (0–1)	**Guerra** (3)	56,000	4–1
6	April 11	Pirates	**W** 4–1	**Billingsley** (2–0)	Bédard (0–1)	**Guerra** (4)	29,729	5–1
7	April 12	Pirates	**W** 3–2	**Capuano** (1–0)	Karstens (0–1)	**Guerra** (5)	28,328	6–1
8	April 13	Padres	**W** 9–8	**Jansen** (2–0)	Cashner (0–1)		31,601	7–1
9	April 14	Padres	**W** 6–1	**Lilly** (1–0)	Wieland (0–1)		46,549	8–1
10	April 15	Padres	**W** 5–4	**Guerra** (1–0)	Brach (0–1)		38,359	9–1
11	April 17	@ Brewers	L 4–5	Veras (1–0)	**Guerra** (1–1)		27,159	9–2
12	April 18	@ Brewers	L 2–3 (10)	Loe (1–0)	**Guerrier** (0–1)		30,189	9–3
13	April 19	@ Brewers	**W** 4–3	**Harang** (1–1)	Wolf (0–2)	**Guerra** (6)	30,091	10–3
14	April 20	@ Astros	**W** 3–1	**Lilly** (2–0)	Happ (1–1)	**Guerra** (7)	30,270	11–3
15	April 21	@ Astros	**W** 5–1	**Kershaw** (1–0)	Weiland (0–3)		25,562	12–3
16	April 22	@ Astros	L 0–12	Rodríguez (1–2)	**Billingsley** (2–1)		23,948	12–4
17	April 23	Braves	**W** 7–2	**Capuano** (2–0)	Jurrjens (0–2)		26,376	13–4
18	April 24	Braves	L 3–4	O'Flaherty (1–0)	**Guerra** (1–2)	Kimbrel (6)	44,014	13–5
19	April 25	Braves	L 2–4	Venters (2–0)	**Guerra** (1–3)	Kimbrel (7)	26,345	13–6
20	April 27	Nationals	**W** 3–2	**Kershaw** (2–0)	Detwiler (2–1)	**Jansen** (1)	44,807	14–6
21	April 28	Nationals	**W** 4–3 (10)	**Wright** (1–0)	Gorzelanny (1–1)		54,242	15–6
22	April 29	Nationals	**W** 2–0	**Capuano** (3–0)	González (2–1)	**Jansen** (2)	48,753	16–6
23	April 30	@ Rockies	L 2–6	Nicasio (2–0)	**Harang** (1–2)		25,227	16–7

May (16–12)

#	Date	Opponent	Score	Win	Loss	Save	Attendance	Record
24	May 1	@ Rockies	**W** 7–6	**Lilly** (3–0)	Chacin (0–3)	**Guerra** (8)	26,211	17–7
25	May 2	@ Rockies	L 5–8	Betancourt (1–0)	**Wright** (1–1)		30,276	17–8
26	May 4	@ Cubs	L 4–5	Maholm (3–2)	**Billingsley** (2–2)	Dolis (2)	37,332	17–9
27	May 5	@ Cubs	**W** 5–1	**Capuano** (4–0)	Volstad (0–4)		39,874	18–9
28	May 6	@ Cubs	L 3–4 (11)	Dolis (2–2)	**Wright** (1–2)		38,125	18–10
29	May 7	Giants	**W** 9–1	**Lilly** (4–0)	Zito (1–1)		43,713	19–10
30	May 8	Giants	L 1–2	Vogelsong (1–2)	**Kershaw** (2–1)	Casilla (6)	32,799	19–11
31	May 9	Giants	**W** 6–2	**Wright** (2–2)	Lincecum (2–3)		33,993	20–11
32	May 11	Rockies	**W** 7–3	**Capuano** (5–0)	Moyer (1–3)		35,591	21–11
33	May 12	Rockies	**W** 2–1	**Harang** (2–2)	Outman (0–1)	**Jansen** (3)	33,735	22–11
34	May 13	Rockies	**W** 11–5	**Lilly** (5–0)	White (0–2)		49,124	23–11
35	May 14	Diamondbacks	**W** 3–1	**Kershaw** (3–1)	Kennedy (3–3)	**Jansen** (4)	24,312	24–11
36	May 15	Diamondbacks	L 1–5	Miley (4–1)	**Billingsley** (2–3)		47,077	24–12
37	May 16	@ Padres	L 2–4	Richard (2–5)	**Capuano** (5–1)	Thayer (4)	21,019	24–13
38	May 17	@ Padres	**W** 8–1	**Harang** (3–2)	Vólquez (2–3)		27,883	25–13
39	May 18	Cardinals	**W** 6–5	**Jansen** (3–0)	Salas (0–2)		40,906	26–13
40	May 19	Cardinals	**W** 6–0	**Kershaw** (4–1)	Westbrook (4–3)		39,383	27–13
41	May 20	Cardinals	**W** 6–5	**Guerra** (2–3)	Rzepczynski (0–2)	**Jansen** (5)	44,005	28–13
42	May 21	@ Diamondbacks	**W** 6–1	**Capuano** (6–1)	Corbin (2–3)		24,768	29–13
43	May 22	@ Diamondbacks	**W** 8–7	**Lindblom** (2–0)	Putz (0–3)	**Jansen** (6)	25,738	30–13
44	May 23	@ Diamondbacks	L 4–11	Saunders (3–3)	**Lilly** (5–1)		27,645	30–14
45	May 25	Astros	L 1–3	Harrell (4–3)	**Kershaw** (4–2)	Myers (12)	36,283	30–15
46	May 26	Astros	**W** 6–3	**Jansen** (4–0)	Wright (0–1)		36,561	31–15
47	May 27	Astros	**W** 5–1	**Capuano** (7–1)	Happ (4–4)		33,306	32–15
48	May 28	Brewers	L 2–3	Marcum (3–3)	**Harang** (3–3)	Axford (8)	38,016	32–16
49	May 29	Brewers	L 1–2	Fiers (1–0)	**Eovaldi** (0–1)	Axford (9)	51,137	32–17
50	May 30	Brewers	L 3–6	Gallardo (4–4)	**Kershaw** (4–3)	Axford (10)	25,509	32–18
51	May 31	Brewers	L 2–6	Greinke (6–2)	**Billingsley** (2–4)		26,773	32–19

June (11–17)

#	Date	Opponent	Score	Win	Loss	Save	Attendance	Record
52	June 1	@ Rockies	L 3–13	Ottavino (1–0)	**Capuano** (7–2)		36,795	32–20
53	June 2	@ Rockies	**W** 6–2	**Harang** (4–3)	Nicasio (2–3)		36,175	33–20
54	June 3	@ Rockies	L 2–3	White (2–3)	**Eovaldi** (0–2)	Betancourt (10)	35,353	33–21
55	June 4	@ Phillies	**W** 4–3	**Belisario** (1–0)	Papelbon (0–2)	**Jansen** (7)	45,572	34–21
56	June 5	@ Phillies	**W** 2–1	**Billingsley** (3–4)	Lee (0–3)	**Jansen** (8)	43,989	35–21
57	June 6	@ Phillies	**W** 6–5	**Capuano** (8–2)	Kendrick (2–5)	**Jansen** (9)	44,216	36–21
58	June 7	@ Phillies	**W** 8–3	**Harang** (5–3)	Hamels (8–3)		44,096	37–21
59	June 8	@ Mariners	L 0–1	Pryor (1–0)	**Elbert** (0–1)	Wilhelmsen (3)	22,028	37–22
60	June 9	@ Mariners	**W** 8–3	**Kershaw** (5–3)	Vargas (7–5)		30,287	38–22
61	June 10	@ Mariners	**W** 8–2	**Billingsley** (4–4)	Beavan (3–6)		34,807	39–22
62	June 11	Angels	L 2–3	Isringhausen (2–0)	**Jansen** (4–1)	Frieri (5)	50,559	39–23
63	June 12	Angels	**W** 5–2	**Wright** (3–2)	Williams (6–4)	**Jansen** (10)	55,279	40–23
64	June 13	Angels	L 1–2	Hawkins (1–1)	**Jansen** (4–2)	Frieri (6)	43,494	40–24
65	June 15	White Sox	**W** 7–6	**Belisario** (2–0)	Thornton (2–4)	**Jansen** (11)	40,432	41–24
66	June 16	White Sox	L 4–5	Humber (3–4)	**Billingsley** (4–5)	Reed (8)	45,210	41–25
67	June 17	White Sox	**W** 2–1 (10)	**Belisario** (3–0)	Thornton (2–5)		53,504	42–25
68	June 19	@ Athletics	L 0–3	McCarthy (6–3)	**Harang** (5–4)	Cook (4)	20,244	42–26
69	June 20	@ Athletics	L 1–4	Milone (7–5)	**Eovaldi** (0–3)		25,383	42–27
70	June 21	@ Athletics	L 1–4	Cook (2–1)	**Lindblom** (2–1)		23,337	42–28
71	June 22	@ Angels	L 5–8	Haren (5–7)	**Billingsley** (4–6)	Frieri (8)	44,548	42–29
72	June 23	@ Angels	**W** 3–1	**Capuano** (9–2)	Santana (4–8)	**Jansen** (12)		43–29
73	June 24	@ Angels	L 3–5	Downs (1–0)	**Lindblom** (2–2)	Frieri (9)	43,975	43–30
74	June 25	@ Giants	L 0–8	Zito (6–5)	**Eovaldi** (0–4)		42,164	43–31
75	June 26	@ Giants	L 0–2	Vogelsong (7–3)	**Kershaw** (5–4)	Casilla (21)	42,664	43–32
76	June 27	@ Giants	L 0–3	Lincecum (3–8)	**Billingsley** (4–7)	Romo (4)	42,245	43–33
77	June 28	Mets	L 2–3	Young (2–1)	**Capuano** (9–3)	Parnell (1)	49,006	43–34
78	June 29	Mets	L 0–9	Dickey (12–1)	**Harang** (5–5)		49,763	43–35
79	June 30	Mets	L 0–5	Santana (6–4)	**Eovaldi** (0–5)		44,217	43–36

July (13–13)

#	Date	Opponent	Score	Win	Loss	Save	Attendance	Record
80	July 1	Mets	**W** 8–3	**Kershaw** (6–4)	Gee (5–7)		55,359	44–36
81	July 2	Reds	L 2–8	Bailey (6–6)	**Billingsley** (4–8)		34,493	44–37
82	July 3	Reds	**W** 3–1	**Elbert** (1–1)	Cueto (9–5)	**Jansen** (13)	33,884	45–37
83	July 4	Reds	**W** 4–1	**Harang** (6–5)	Leake (3–6)	**Jansen** (14)	53,570	46–37
84	July 5	@ Diamondbacks	**W** 4–1	**Eovaldi** (1–5)	Miley (9–5)	**Jansen** (15)	23,002	47–37
85	July 6	@ Diamondbacks	L 3–5	Collmenter (1–2)	**Kershaw** (6–5)	Putz (15)	24,891	47–38
86	July 7	@ Diamondbacks	L 3–5	Cahill (7–7)	**Billingsley** (4–9)	Putz (16)	36,903	47–39
87	July 8	@ Diamondbacks	L 1–7	Bauer (1–1)	**Capuano** (9–4)	Corbin (1)	30,523	47–40
88	July 13	Padres	**W** 2–1	**Kershaw** (7–5)	Richard (6–10)	**Jansen** (16)	43,873	48–40
89	July 14	Padres	L 6–7	Hinshaw (1–1)	**Jansen** (4–3)	Street (14)	54,014	48–41
90	July 15	Padres	L 2–7	Marquis (4–9)	**Capuano** (9–5)		39,715	48–42
91	July 16	Phillies	L 2–3	Blanton (8–8)	**Eovaldi** (1–6)	Papelbon (20)	32,238	48–43
92	July 17	Phillies	L 2–3	Kendrick (3–8)	**Belisario** (3–1)	Papelbon (21)	53,498	48–44
93	July 18	Phillies	**W** 5–3 (12)	**Wright** (4–2)	Diekman (1–1)		39,955	49–44
94	July 20	@ Mets	**W** 7–6	**Harang** (7–5)	Santana (6–7)	**Jansen** (17)	30,806	50–44
95	July 21	@ Mets	**W** 8–5	**Capuano** (10–5)	Batista (1–3)	**Jansen** (18)	33,503	51–44
96	July 22	@ Mets	**W** 8–3 (12)	**Wall** (1–0)	Ramírez (2–2)		31,184	52–44
97	July 23	@ Cardinals	**W** 5–3	**Billingsley** (5–9)	Kelly (1–3)	**Jansen** (19)	42,806	53–44
98	July 24	@ Cardinals	L 2–8	Wainwright (8–10)	**Kershaw** (7–6)		38,195	53–45
99	July 25	@ Cardinals	L 2–3 (12)	Salas (1–3)	**Wright** (4–3)		37,841	53–46
100	July 26	@ Cardinals	L 4–7	Westbrook (9–8)	**Capuano** (10–6)	Motte (22)	36,607	53–47
101	July 27	@ Giants	**W** 5–3 (10)	**Tolleson** (1–0)	Romo (3–2)	**Jansen** (20)	41,681	54–47
102	July 28	@ Giants	**W** 10–0	**Billingsley** (6–9)	Zito (8–7)		42,030	55–47
103	July 29	@ Giants	**W** 4–0	**Kershaw** (8–6)	Vogelsong (8–5)		41,902	56–47
104	July 30	Diamondbacks	L 2–7	Cahill (9–9)	**Harang** (7–6)		33,180	56–48
105	July 31	Diamondbacks	L 2–8	Miley (12–6)	**Capuano** (10–7)		52,832	56–49

August (14–14)

#	Date	Opponent	Score	Win	Loss	Save	Attendance	Record
106	August 1	Diamondbacks	L 0–4	Corbin (3–4)	**Fife** (0–1)		36,596	56–50
107	August 3	Cubs	**W** 6–1	**Billingsley** (7–9)	Samardzija (7–9)		43,537	57–50
108	August 4	Cubs	**W** 3–1	**Kershaw** (9–6)	Volstad (0–8)	**Jansen** (21)	46,588	58–50
109	August 5	Cubs	**W** 7–6	**Jansen** (5–3)	Camp (2–5)		42,495	59–50
110	August 6	Rockies	L 0–2	Ottavino (3–1)	**Capuano** (10–8)	Betancourt (18)	32,659	59–51
111	August 7	Rockies	L 1–3	Roenicke (4–0)	**Harang** (7–7)	Betancourt (19)	55,024	59–52
112	August 8	Rockies	**W** 6–4	**Billingsley** (8–9)	Torres (1–1)	**Jansen** (22)	37,084	60–52
113	August 10	@ Marlins	**W** 5–2	**Kershaw** (10–6)	Buehrle (9–11)	**Jansen** (23)	28,130	61–52
114	August 11	@ Marlins	L 3–7	Nolasco (9–11)	**Blanton** (8–10)		27,681	61–53
115	August 12	@ Marlins	**W** 5–0	**Capuano** (11–8)	LeBlanc (1–2)		28,388	62–53
116	August 13	@ Pirates	**W** 5–4	**Harang** (8–7)	Karstens (4–3)	**Jansen** (24)	25,670	63–53
117	August 14	@ Pirates	**W** 11–0	**Billingsley** (9–9)	Correia (9–7)		22,729	64–53
118	August 15	@ Pirates	**W** 9–3	**Kershaw** (11–6)	Rodríguez (7–12)		26,522	65–53
119	August 16	@ Pirates	L 6–10	Burnett (15–4)	**Blanton** (8–11)		25,073	65–54
120	August 17	@ Braves	L 3–4 (11)	Venters (5–3)	**League** (0–6)		33,093	65–55
121	August 18	@ Braves	**W** 6–2	**Harang** (9–7)	Sheets (4–3)	**Jansen** (25)	42,219	66–55
122	August 19	@ Braves	**W** 5–0	**Billingsley** (10–9)	Minor (6–10)		26,798	67–55
123	August 20	Giants	L 1–2	Bumgarner (14–7)	**Kershaw** (11–7)	López (2)	36,878	67–56
124	August 21	Giants	L 1–4	Lincecum (7–13)	**Blanton** (8–12)	López (3)	56,000	67–57
125	August 22	Giants	L 4–8	Cain (13–5)	**Capuano** (11–9)		40,173	67–58
126	August 24	Marlins	**W** 11–4	**Wright** (5–3)	Eovaldi (4–9)		39,805	68–58
127	August 25	Marlins	**W** 8–2	**Kershaw** (12–7)	Johnson (7–11)		40,284	69–58
128	August 26	Marlins	L 2–6	Buehrle (12–11)	**Harang** (9–8)	Cishek (11)	41,907	69–59
129	August 27	@ Rockies	L 0–10	Francis (5–4)	**Beckett** (5–12)	Belisle (2)	30,148	69–60
130	August 28	@ Rockies	L 4–8	Chatwood (4–3)	**Capuano** (11–10)		28,368	69–61
131	August 29	@ Rockies	**W** 10–8	**Blanton** (9–12)	Pomeranz (1–8)	**Belisario** (1)	25,155	70–61
132	August 30	Diamondbacks	L 0–2	Kennedy (12–11)	**Kershaw** (12–8)	Putz (27)	54,621	70–62
133	August 31	Diamondbacks	L 3–4 (11)	Bergesen (1–0)	**Guerrier** (0–2)	Putz (28)	37,622	70–63

September (14–12)

#	Date	Opponent	Score	Win	Loss	Save	Attendance	Record
134	September 1	Diamondbacks	**W** 2–1	**Beckett** (6–12)	Albers (2–1)	**League** (10)	35,992	71–63
135	September 2	Diamondbacks	**W** 5–4	**Belisario** (4–1)	Putz (1–5)		31,607	72–63
136	September 3	Padres	**W** 4–3 (11)	**League** (1–6)	Burns (0–1)		33,540	73–63
137	September 4	Padres	L 3–6 (11)	Layne (1–0)	**Ely** (0–1)	Gregerson (4)	40,619	73–64
138	September 5	Padres	L 3–4	Vincent (2–0)	**Tolleson** (1–1)	Layne (2)	50,560	73–65
139	September 7	@ Giants	L 2–5	Casilla (7–5)	**Beckett** (6–13)	Romo (10)	41,666	73–66
140	September 8	@ Giants	**W** 3–2	**Belisario** (5–1)	Affeldt (1–2)	**League** (11)	41,791	74–66
141	September 9	@ Giants	L 0–4	Zito (11–8)	**Blanton** (9–13)		41,517	74–67
142	September 11	@ Diamondbacks	L 0–1	Kennedy (13–11)	**Kershaw** (12–9)	Hernandez (3)	23,966	74–68
143	September 12	@ Diamondbacks	L 2–3	Cahill (11–11)	**Harang** (9–9)	Hernandez (4)	25,048	74–69
144	September 13	Cardinals	L 1–2	Lynn (15–7)	**Rodriguez** (0–1)	Motte (34)	43,309	74–70
145	September 14	Cardinals	**W** 8–5	**Tolleson** (2–1)	Rosenthal (0–2)		40,167	75–70
146	September 15	Cardinals	**W** 4–3	**Belisario** (6–1)	Motte (4–5)		42,449	76–70
147	September 16	Cardinals	L 2–5 (12)	Miller (1–0)	**Ely** (0–2)	Motte (35)	35,754	76–71
	September 18	@ Nationals	Postponed (rain). Makeup Date September 19.					
148	September 19	@ Nationals	L 1–3	Zimmermann (11–8)	**Harang** (9–10)	Clippard (32)	26,931	76–72
149	September 19	@ Nationals	**W** 7–6	**Belisario** (7–1)	Clippard (2–5)	**League** (12)	26,931	77–72
150	September 20	@ Nationals	L 1–4	Detwiler (10–6)	**Capuano** (11–11)	Storen (3)	30,359	77–73
151	September 21	@ Reds	**W** 3–1 (10)	**Belisario** (8–1)	LeCure (3–3)	**League** (13)	35,397	78–73
152	September 22	@ Reds	L 0–6	Latos (13–4)	**Fife** (0–2)		41,117	78–74
153	September 23	@ Reds	**W** 5–3	**Tolleson** (3–1)	Bailey (12–10)	**League** (14)	32,932	79–74
154	September 25	@ Padres	L 1–2	Vólquez (11–11)	**Beckett** (6–14)	Street (23)	32,346	79–75
155	September 26	@ Padres	**W** 8–2	**Harang** (10–10)	Richard (14–13)		24,818	80–75
156	September 27	@ Padres	**W** 8–4	**Capuano** (12–11)	Kelly (2–3)		32,403	81–75
157	September 28	Rockies	**W** 8–0	**Kershaw** (13–9)	Francis (5–7)		37,133	82–75
158	September 29	Rockies	**W** 3–0	**Blanton** (10–13)	Chatwood (5–6)	**League** (15)	40,724	83–75
159	September 30	Rockies	**W** 7–1	**Beckett** (7–14)	de la Rosa (0–2)		35,607	84–75

October (2–1)

#	Date	Opponent	Score	Win	Loss	Save	Attendance	Record
160	October 1	Giants	**W** 3–2	**League** (2–6)	Casilla (7–6)		33,624	85–75
161	October 2	Giants	L 3–4	Zito (15–8)	**Capuano** (12–12)	Romo (15)	42,473	85–76
162	October 3	Giants	**W** 5–1	**Kershaw** (14–9)	Hensley (4–5)		34,014	86–76

== Roster ==
2012 Los Angeles Dodgers
Roster
Pitchers: 61 Josh Beckett; 51 Ronald Belisario; 58 Chad Billingsley; 56 Joe Blanton; 35 Chris Capuano; 50 Randy Choate; 60 Todd Coffey; 41 Rubby De La Rosa; 57 Scott Elbert; 48 John Ely; 50 Nathan Eovaldi; 56,59 Stephen Fife; 54 Javy Guerra; 55 Matt Guerrier; 44 Aaron Harang; 74 Kenley Jansen; 22 Clayton Kershaw; 31 Brandon League; 29 Ted Lilly; 52 Josh Lindblom; 66 Mike MacDougal; 75 Paco Rodriguez; 38 Shawn Tolleson; 46 Josh Wall; 28 Jamey Wright	Catchers: 17 A. J. Ellis; 52 Tim Federowicz; 18 Matt Treanor; Infielders: 47 Luis Cruz; 13 Iván DeJesús Jr.; 14 Mark Ellis; 23 Adrián González; 9 Dee Gordon; 6 Jerry Hairston Jr.; 37 Elián Herrera; 3 Adam Kennedy; 7 James Loney; 7 Nick Punto; 13 Hanley Ramírez; 12 Justin Sellers; 5 Juan Uribe	Outfielders: 33,23,12 Bobby Abreu; 49 Alex Castellanos; 16 Andre Ethier; 10 Tony Gwynn Jr.; 27 Matt Kemp; 21 Juan Rivera; 30 Jerry Sands; 33 Scott Van Slyke; 8 Shane Victorino	Manager: 8,12,88 Don Mattingly; Coaches: 25 Dave Hansen (hitting); 45 Trey Hillman (bench); 40 Rick Honeycutt (pitching); 43 Ken Howell (bullpen); 15 Davey Lopes (1st base); 11 Manny Mota; 26 Tim Wallach (third base)

== Player stats ==
=== Batting ===
List does not include pitchers. Stats in bold are the team leaders.

Note: G = Games played; AB = At bats; R = Runs; H = Hits; 2B = Doubles; 3B = Triples; HR = Home runs; RBI = Runs batted in; BB = Walks; SO = Strikeouts; SB = Stolen bases; Avg. = Batting average; OBP = On-base percentage; SLG = Slugging; OPS = On-base plus slugging

Player	G	AB	R	H	2B	3B	HR	RBI	BB	SO	SB	AVG	OBP	SLG	OPS
Andre Ethier	**149**	**556**	**79**	**158**	**36**	1	20	**89**	50	**124**	2	**.284**	**.351**	**.460**	**.812**
A. J. Ellis	133	423	44	114	20	1	13	52	**65**	107	0	.270	.373	.414	.786
Mark Ellis	110	415	62	107	21	1	7	31	40	70	5	.258	.333	.364	.697
Matt Kemp	106	403	74	122	22	2	**23**	69	40	103	9	.303	.367	.538	.906
James Loney	114	334	32	85	18	0	4	33	23	39	0	.254	.302	.344	.646
Juan Rivera	109	312	30	76	14	0	9	47	18	35	1	.244	.286	.375	.661
Dee Gordon	87	303	38	69	9	2	1	17	20	62	**32**	.228	.280	.281	.561
Luis Cruz	78	283	26	84	20	0	6	40	9	34	2	.297	.322	.431	.753
Tony Gwynn Jr.	103	259	29	60	8	**4**	0	17	16	52	13	.232	.276	.293	.570
Hanley Ramírez	64	251	30	68	11	2	10	44	17	60	7	.271	.324	.450	.774
Jerry Hairston Jr.	78	238	19	65	13	1	4	26	23	27	1	.273	.342	.387	.729
Shane Victorino	53	208	26	51	12	2	2	15	18	31	15	.245	.316	.351	.667
Bobby Abreu	92	195	28	48	8	1	3	19	35	51	6	.246	.361	.344	.704
Elián Herrera	67	187	26	47	10	1	1	17	23	50	4	.251	.340	.332	.671
Adam Kennedy	86	168	22	44	8	1	2	16	23	33	1	.262	.345	.357	.702
Juan Uribe	66	162	15	31	9	0	2	17	13	37	0	.191	.258	.284	.542
Adrián González	36	145	12	43	10	1	3	22	11	29	2	.297	.344	.441	.785
Matt Treanor	36	103	11	18	3	1	2	10	14	29	1	.175	.281	.282	.563
Scott Van Slyke	27	54	4	9	2	0	2	7	2	14	1	.167	.196	.315	.511
Justin Sellers	19	44	6	9	3	1	1	2	5	14	0	.205	.286	.386	.672
Nick Punto	22	35	6	10	1	0	0	0	6	9	1	.286	.390	.314	.705
Iván DeJesús Jr.	23	33	5	9	3	0	0	4	3	7	1	.273	.324	.364	.688
Alex Castellanos	16	23	3	4	0	1	1	3	0	8	0	.174	.200	.391	.591
Jerry Sands	9	23	2	4	2	0	0	1	1	9	0	.174	.208	.261	.469
Tim Federowicz	3	3	0	1	0	0	0	0	1	2	0	.333	.500	.333	.833
Non-Pitcher Totals	162	5160	629	1336	263	23	116	598	476	1036	104	.259	.326	.386	.712
**Team totals**	**162**	**5438**	**637**	**1369**	**269**	**23**	**116**	**607**	**481**	**1156**	**104**	**.252**	**.317**	**.374**	**.690**

=== Pitching ===
Stats in bold are the team leaders.

Note: W = Wins; L = Losses; ERA = Earned run average; G = Games pitched; GS = Games started; SV = Saves; IP = Innings pitched; H = Hits allowed; R = Runs allowed; ER = Earned runs allowed; BB = Walks allowed; K = Strikeouts

Player	W	L	ERA	G	GS	SV	IP	H	R	ER	BB	K
Clayton Kershaw	**14**	9	**2.53**	33	**33**	0	**227.2**	170	70	64	63	**229**
Chris Capuano	12	**12**	3.72	33	**33**	0	198.1	**188**	**91**	**82**	54	162
Aaron Harang	10	10	3.61	31	31	0	179.2	167	85	72	**85**	131
Chad Billingsley	10	9	3.55	25	25	0	149.2	148	66	59	45	128
Ronald Belisario	8	1	2.54	**68**	0	1	71.0	47	22	20	29	69
Jamey Wright	5	3	3.72	66	0	0	67.2	72	35	28	30	54
Kenley Jansen	5	3	2.35	65	0	**25**	65.0	33	18	17	22	99
Joe Blanton	2	4	4.99	10	10	0	57.2	66	32	32	16	51
Nathan Eovaldi	1	6	4.15	10	10	0	56.1	63	27	26	20	34
Ted Lilly	5	1	3.14	8	8	0	48.2	36	23	17	19	31
Josh Lindblom	2	2	3.02	48	0	0	47.2	42	16	16	18	43
Javy Guerra	2	3	2.60	45	0	8	45.0	44	13	13	23	37
Josh Beckett	2	3	2.93	7	7	0	43.0	43	16	14	14	38
Shawn Tolleson	3	1	4.30	40	0	0	37.2	30	19	18	20	39
Scott Elbert	1	1	2.20	43	0	0	32.2	27	8	8	13	29
Brandon League	2	1	2.30	28	0	6	27.1	17	7	7	14	27
Stephen Fife	0	2	2.70	5	5	0	26.2	25	8	8	12	20
Todd Coffey	1	0	4.66	23	0	0	19.1	17	11	10	9	18
Matt Guerrier	0	2	3.86	16	0	0	14.0	8	6	6	7	9
Randy Choate	0	0	4.05	36	0	0	13.1	13	7	6	9	11
Paco Rodriguez	0	1	1.35	11	0	0	6.2	3	1	1	4	6
Mike MacDougal	0	0	7.94	7	0	0	5.2	9	5	5	6	4
Josh Wall	1	0	4.76	7	0	0	5.2	3	3	3	1	4
John Ely	0	2	20.25	2	0	0	2.2	6	6	6	4	3
Rubby De La Rosa	0	0	27.00	1	0	0	0.2	0	2	2	2	0
**Team totals**	**86**	**76**	**3.34**	**162**	**162**	**40**	**1449.2**	**1277**	**597**	**538**	**539**	**1276**

== Awards and honors ==
- 2012 Major League Baseball All-Star Game

Clayton Kershaw
Matt Kemp

- National League Player of the Week
  - Matt Kemp (April 4–8 )
  - Matt Kemp (April 9 – 15)
  - Clayton Kershaw (May 14 – 20)
- National League Player of the Month
  - Matt Kemp (April)
- Roberto Clemente Award
  - Clayton Kershaw

== Transactions ==
=== April 2012 ===
- On April 14, placed RHP Todd Coffey on the 15-day disabled list and activated LHP Ted Lilly from the 15-day disabled list.
- On April 24, placed RHP Matt Guerrier on the 15-day disabled list, retroactive to April 19, and purchased the contract of LHP Michael Antonini from AAA Albuquerque.
- On April 27, optioned LHP Michael Antonini to AAA Albuquerque, and recalled RHP Nathan Eovaldi from AA Chattanooga.
- On April 29, optioned RHP Nathan Eovaldi to AA Chattanooga.
- On April 30, activated RHP Todd Coffey from the 15-day disabled list.

=== May 2012 ===
- On May 3, activated RHP Ronald Belisario from the restricted list and designated RHP Mike MacDougal for assignment.
- On May 4, signed free agent OF Bobby Abreu and optioned INF Justin Sellers to AAA Albuquerque.
- On May 7, reinstated IF Iván DeJesús Jr. from the disabled list and optioned him to AAA Albuquerque.
- On May 9, recalled OF Scott Van Slyke from AAA Albuquerque, and placed OF Juan Rivera on the 15-day disabled list.
- On May 11, placed IF Jerry Hairston Jr. on the 15-day disabled list with a strained hamstring, retroactive to May 7, and recalled IF Justin Sellers from AAA Albuquerque.
- On May 14, placed OF Matt Kemp (strained hamstring) and IF Juan Uribe (left wrist injury) on the 15-day disabled list, purchased the contract of IF/OF Elián Herrera from AAA Albuquerque, recalled OF Jerry Sands from AAA Albuquerque, and designated OF Trent Oeltjen for assignment.
- On May 19, placed 2B Mark Ellis on the 15-day disabled list (left leg injury) and recalled IF Iván DeJesús Jr. from AAA Albuquerque.
- On May 25, reinstated IF Jerry Hairston Jr. from the 15-day disabled list, and placed IF Justin Sellers on the 15-day disabled list (bulging back disk) retroactive to May 23.
- On May 28, placed LHP Ted Lilly on the 15-day disabled list (shoulder inflammation) and recalled LHP Michael Antonini from AAA Albuquerque.
- On May 29, activated OF Matt Kemp from the 15-day disabled list, recalled RHP Nathan Eovaldi from AA Chattanooga and optioned LHP Michael Antonini and OF Jerry Sands to AAA Albuquerque.
- On May 31, placed OF Matt Kemp on the 15-day disabled list (strained hamstring) and recalled OF/2B Alex Castellanos from AAA Albuquerque.

=== June 2012 ===
- On June 4, placed RHP Javy Guerra on the 15-day disabled list (right knee inflammation), moved RHP Matt Guerrier from the 15-day disabled list to the 60-day disabled list, optioned OF/1B Scott Van Slyke to AAA Albuquerque, recalled OF/1B Juan Rivera from the 15-day disabled list, and purchased the contract of RHP Shawn Tolleson from AAA Albuquerque.
- On June 11, activated 3B Juan Uribe from the 15-day disabled list and optioned OF Alex Castellanos to AAA Albuquerque.
- On June 28, recalled OF Scott Van Slyke from AAA Albuquerque, and optioned Iván DeJesús Jr. to AAA Albuquerque.
- On June 29, transferred IF Justin Sellers to the 60-day disabled list and signed OF Yasiel Puig as an international free agent. Optioned Puig to the Arizona Rookie League.

=== July 2012 ===
- On July 2, purchased the contract of IF Luis Cruz from AAA Albuquerque, optioned RHP Shawn Tolleson to AAA Albuquerque, and transferred LHP Ted Lilly from the 15-day disabled list to the 60-day disabled list.
- On July 3, recalled RHP Shawn Tolleson from AAA Albuquerque, and placed RHP Todd Coffey on the 15-day disabled list (torn elbow ligament).
- On July 4, activated IF Mark Ellis from the 15-day disabled list, and placed OF Andre Ethier on the 15-day disabled list, retroactive to June 28 (strained left oblique).
- On July 5, activated RHP Javy Guerra from the 15-day disabled list, and placed SS Dee Gordon on the 15-day disabled list (torn ulnar collateral ligament in right thumb).
- On July 13, activated OF Matt Kemp and OF Andre Ethier from the 15-day disabled list and optioned IF/OF Elián Herrera and OF Scott Van Slyke to AAA Albuquerque.
- On July 14, placed RHP Javy Guerra on the bereavement list, and purchased the contract of RHP Josh Wall from AAA Albuquerque.
- On July 17, placed RHP Chad Billingsley on the 15-day disabled list retroactive to July 8 (sore elbow) and recalled RHP Stephen Fife from AAA Albuquerque.
- On July 18, activated RHP Javy Guerra from the bereavement list, and optioned RHP Stephen Fife to AAA Albuquerque.
- On July 23, activated RHP Chad Billingsley off the 15-day disabled list and optioned RHP Josh Wall to AAA Albuquerque.
- On July 25, traded RHP Nathan Eovaldi and RHP Scott McGough to the Miami Marlins for 3B Hanley Ramírez and LHP Randy Choate. Optioned RHP Shawn Tolleson to AAA Albuquerque and transferred RHP Todd Coffey from the 15-day disabled list to the 60-day disabled list.
- On July 26, placed IF Adam Kennedy on the 15-day disabled list, and recalled RHP Shawn Tolleson from AAA Albuquerque.
- On July 27, placed LHP Scott Elbert on the 15-day disabled list, and recalled RHP Stephen Fife from AAA Albuquerque.
- On July 31, traded RHP Logan Bawcom and OF Leon Landry to the Seattle Mariners for RHP Brandon League. Traded RHP Josh Lindblom, RHP Ethan Martin and a player to be named later or cash to the Philadelphia Phillies for OF Shane Victorino. Designated LHP Michael Antonini for assignment.

=== August 2012 ===
- On August 1, designated OF Bobby Abreu for assignment.
- On August 3, acquired RHP Joe Blanton from the Philadelphia Phillies for a player to be named later (RHP Ryan O'Sullivan), or cash.
- On August 4, optioned RHP Stephen Fife to AAA Albuquerque.
- On August 6, designated OF Tony Gwynn Jr. for assignment, and recalled OF/1B Jerry Sands from AAA Albuquerque.
- On August 8, optioned OF/1B Jerry Sands to AAA Albuquerque.
- On August 10, activated IF Adam Kennedy from the 15-day disabled list.
- On August 13, placed IF Jerry Hairston Jr. on the 15-day disabled list (left hip inflammation) retroactive to August 12, and recalled IF Elián Herrera from AAA Albuquerque.
- On August 19, optioned IF Elián Herrera to AAA Albuquerque, and activated LHP Scott Elbert from the 15-day disabled list.
- On August 22, optioned RHP Javy Guerra to AAA Albuquerque, and activated RHP Rubby De La Rosa from the 60-day disabled list.
- On August 24, optioned RHP Rubby De La Rosa to AA Chattanooga, and recalled OF Alex Castellanos from AAA Albuquerque.
- On August 25, traded RHP Allen Webster, IF Iván DeJesús Jr., 1B James Loney and two players to be named later to the Boston Red Sox for 1B Adrián González, RHP Josh Beckett, OF Carl Crawford, and IF Nick Punto. Optioned OF Alex Castellanos to AAA Albuquerque, placed RHP Chad Billingsley on the 15-day disabled list (right elbow pain), transferred IF Jerry Hairston Jr. from the 15-day disabled list to the 60-day disabled list and placed OF Carl Crawford on the 60-day disabled list
- On August 27, optioned RHP Shawn Tolleson to Hi-A Rancho Cucamonga, and recalled RHP Josh Wall from AAA Albuquerque.
- On August 29, placed LHP Scott Elbert on the 15-day disabled list (elbow pain), and recalled RHP Shawn Tolleson from Hi-A Rancho Cucamonga.
- On August 30, optioned RHP Josh Wall to AAA Albuquerque, activated RHP Matt Guerrier from the 60-day disabled list and transferred SS Dee Gordon from the 15-day disabled list to the 60-day disabled list.

=== September 2012 ===
- On September 1, recalled RHP Javy Guerra and C Tim Federowicz from AAA Albuquerque, purchased the contract of RHP John Ely from AAA Albuquerque and placed OF Alfredo Silverio on the 60-day disabled list (right elbow injury).
- On September 2, purchased the contract of OF Bobby Abreu from AAA Albuquerque, recalled RHP Chris Withrow from AA Chattanooga and placed him on the 60-day disabled list (right shoulder strain).
- On September 4, placed RHP Javy Guerra on the 15-day disabled list (left oblique strain) and recalled RHP Josh Wall from AAA Albuquerque.
- On September 5, purchased the contract of LHP Steven Rodriguez from AA Chattanooga and transferred RHP Chad Billingsley from the 15-day disabled list to the 60-day disabled list.
- On September 7, recalled IF/OF Alex Castellanos from AAA Albuquerque.
- On September 11, recalled IF/OF Elián Herrera and RHP Stephen Fife from AAA Albuquerque, activated SS Dee Gordon from the 60-day disabled list and placed IF Adam Kennedy on the 60-day disabled list.

=== October 2012 ===
- On October 4, 2012, traded OF/1B Jerry Sands and RHP Rubby De La Rosa to the Boston Red Sox to complete the August 25 trade between the two teams.

== Farm system ==
Level	Team	League	Manager	W	L	Position
AAA	Albuquerque Isotopes	Pacific Coast League	Lorenzo Bundy	80	64	1st Place; Lost in playoffs
AA	Chattanooga Lookouts	Southern League	Carlos Subero	73	65	2nd Place; Lost in playoffs
High A	Rancho Cucamonga Quakes	California League	Juan Bustabad	68	72	4th Place
A	Great Lakes Loons	Midwest League	John Shoemaker	67	73	6th Place
Rookie	Ogden Raptors	Pioneer League	Damon Berryhill	44	32	1st place Lost in Championship
Rookie	Arizona League Dodgers	Arizona League	Matt Martin	34	21	1st place Lost in Playoffs
Rookie	DSL Dodgers	Dominican Summer League	Pedro Mega	38	22	3rd Place

=== Minor League statistical leaders ===
==== Batting ====
- Average: Eric Smith – Ogden – .336
- Home Runs: Jerry Sands – Albuquerque – 26
- RBI: Jerry Sands – Albuquerque – 107
- OBP: Jeremy Rathjen – Ogden – .443
- SLG: Alex Castellanos – Albuquerque – .590

==== Pitching ====
- ERA: John Ely – Albuquerque – 3.20
- Wins:John Ely – Albuquerque – 14
- Strikeouts: Matt Magill – Chattanooga – 168
- Saves:Josh Wall -Albuquerque – 28
- WHIP:John Ely – Albuquerque – 1.10

==== Mid-Season All-Stars ====
- Pacific Coast League All-Stars

Pitcher John Ely
Pitcher Josh Wall
Catcher Tim Federowicz
Infielder Luis Cruz

- Southern League All-Stars

Pitcher Ethan Martin
Pitcher Matt Magill
Catcher/First Baseman J. T. Wise
Third Baseman Pedro Báez
Outfielder Blake Smith

- California League All-Stars

Infielder C. J. Retherford

- Midwest League All-Stars

Pitcher Jarret Martin
Outfielder Joe Winker
Designated Hitter O'Koyea Dickson (won the game's MVP Award)

- All-Star Futures Game

Pitcher Chris Reed (world team)

==== Post-Season All-Stars ====
- Pacific Coast League All-Stars

Starting Pitcher John Ely
Relief Pitcher Josh Wall
Catcher Tim Federowicz
Designated Hitter Jerry Sands

- Pioneer League All-Stars

Outfielder Jeremy Rathjen

- Arizona League All-Stars

Pitcher Jonathan Martinez

==== Notes ====
- The Arizona League Dodgers lost to the Arizona League Rangers 7–3 in the Arizona League semi-finals.
- The rookie league Ogden Raptors won the Pioneer League first-half title and clinched a playoff spot and home-field advantage throughout the playoffs. The Raptors later won the second-half title with a 5–4 win over the Orem Owlz, which also set a franchise record with the team's 44th win. Ogden went on to beat the Grand Junction Rockies 2 games to 1 in the semifinals. The Raptors lost to the Missoula Osprey, 2 games to 1, in the championship series, the third straight year they lost in the finals.
- The AA Chattanooga Lookouts clinched the Southern League North second-half title and a playoff berth with a 6–5 win over the Birmingham Barons on September 1. The Jackson Generals eliminated the Lookouts from the postseason by beating them 3 games to 1 in the first round of the playoffs.
- The AAA Albuquerque Isotopes clinched the Pacific Coast League American South division championship and a playoff berth with a 6–5 victory over the Omaha Storm Chasers on September 2. The Isotopes lost in the American Conference Championship series, 3 games to 2, to the Storm Chasers.
- Albuquerque Isotopes pitcher John Ely was named PCL Pitcher of the Year and manager Lorenzo Bundy was named Manager of the Year.
- Seven Dodger minor leaguers were selected to play for the Mesa Solar Sox in the Arizona Fall League: OF Yasiel Puig and Joc Pederson, C Gorman Erickson, IF Rafael Ynoa and pitchers Red Patterson, Eric Eadington and Paco Rodriguez.
- John Ely was named the Dodgers "minor league pitcher of the year" and outfielder Joc Pederson was named as the "minor league player of the year".

== Major League Baseball draft ==
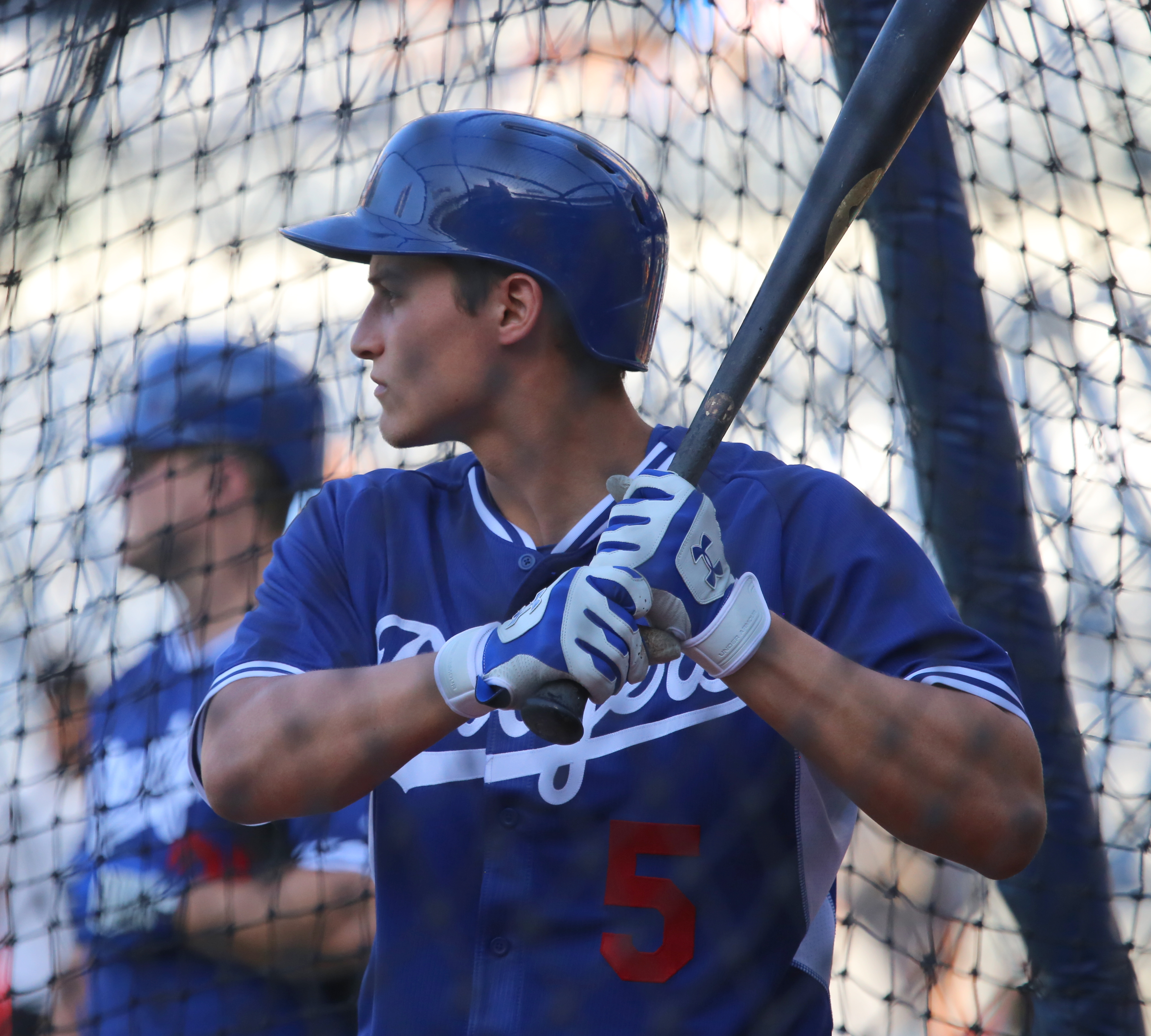
Corey Seager

The Dodgers selected 41 players in this draft. Of those, nine of them played Major League Baseball. The Dodgers received a supplemental first-round pick as compensation for the loss of free agent Rod Barajas.

The first pick of the draft was shortstop Corey Seager from Northwest Cabarrus High School, who became the 2016 NL Rookie of the Year. The supplemental pick was shortstop Jesmuel Valentín from the Puerto Rico Baseball Academy. He was traded to the Philadelphia Phillies during the 2014 season and made his MLB debut for them in 2018.

Left-handed reliever Paco Rodriguez from the University of Florida became the first player from this draft to make his major league debut when he was called up on September 9, 2012.

2012 draft picks

Round	Name	Position	School	Signed	Career span	Highest level
1	Corey Seager	SS	Northwest Cabarrus High School	Yes	2012–present	MLB
1s	Jesmuel Valentín	SS	Puerto Rico Baseball Academy	Yes	2012–2026	MLB
2	Paco Rodriguez	LHP	University of Florida	Yes	2012–2019	MLB
3	Onelki García	LHP		Yes	2007–present	MLB
4	Justin Chigbogu	1B	Raytown South High School	Yes	2012–2017	A
5	Ross Stripling	RHP	Texas A&M University	Yes	2012–2024	MLB
6	Joey Curletta	OF	Mountain Pointe High School	Yes	2012–2019	AAA
7	Theo Alexander	OF	Lake Washington High School	Yes	2012-2014	Rookie
8	Scott Griggs	RHP	University of California, Los Angeles	Yes	2012–2019	AA
9	Zachary Bird	RHP	Murrah High School	Yes	2012–2016	AA
10	Zach Babitt	2B	Academy of Art University	Yes	2012–2013	Rookie
11	Jeremy Rathjen	RF	Rice University	Yes	2012–2015	AA
12	James Campbell	RHP	Stony Brook University	Yes	2012–2015	A+
13	Darnell Sweeney	SS	University of Central Florida	Yes	2012–2024	MLB
14	Matthew Reckling	RHP	Rice University	Yes	2012	Rookie
15	Duke von Schamann	RHP	Texas Tech University	Yes	2012–2022	AAA
16	Josh Henderson	OF	First Baptist Christian School	Yes	2012–2017	Rookie
17	Kevin Maxey	LF	Long Beach Polytechnic High School	No		
18	Eric Smith	C	Stanford University	Yes	2012–2013	A
19	Owen Jones	RHP	University of Portland	Yes	2012–2014	A+
20	Jharel Cotton	RHP	East Carolina University	Yes	2012–2023	MLB
21	Jacob Scavuzzo	CF	Villa Park High School	Yes	2012–2019	AAA
22	Alan García	RHP	Azusa Pacific University	Yes	2012–2017	AAA
23	Lindsey Caughel	RHP	Stetson University	Yes	2012–2018	AAA
24	Paul Hoenecke	1B	University of Wisconsin at Milwaukee	Yes	2012–2017	AA
25	Daniel Coulombe	LHP	Texas Tech University	Yes	2012–present	MLB
26	Jordan Parr	3B	University of Illinois at Urbana–Champaign	No; Diamondbacks-2013	2013–2014	A-
27	Justin Gonzalez	SS	Florida State University	No; Diamondbacks-2014	2014	A-
28	Jake Hermsen	LHP	Northern Illinois University	Yes	2012-2014	A
29	John Cannon	C	University of Houston	Yes	2012–2015	AAA
30	Trent Giambrone	SS	Grace King High School	No; Cubs-2016	2016–2024	MLB
31	David Graybill	RHP	Brophy College Preparatory	No; Giants-2015	2015	Rookie
32	Alfredo Unzue	LHP		Yes	2005–2012	Rookie
33	C. J. Saylor	C	South Hills High School	No; Cardinals-2017	2017–2019	A+
34	Jordan Hershiser	RHP	University of Southern California	Yes	2012–2015	AAA
35	Austin Cowen	C	Western Illinois University	Yes	2012–2014	A
36	José Vizcaíno Jr.	SS	Parker High School	No; Giants-2015	2015–2018	A+
37	John Sgromolo	1B	Flagler College	Yes	2012	Rookie
38	Cory Embree	CF	Maple Woods Community College	Yes	2012	Rookie
39	Korey Dunbar	C	Nitro High School	No; Marlins-2015	2015–2016	A
40	Pat Stover	OF	Santa Clara University	Yes	2012–2013	A
