= Jeremy Hazelbaker =

American baseball player (born 1987)

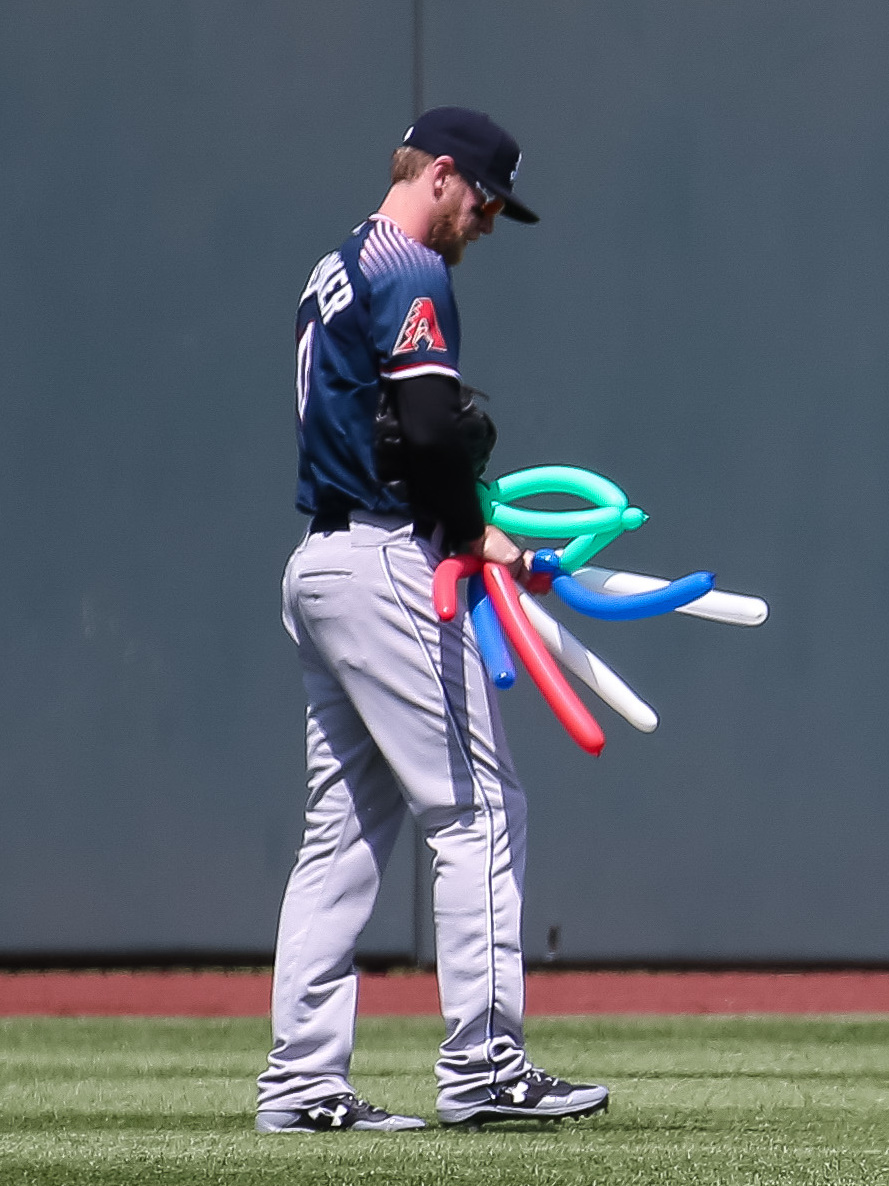
- Hazelbaker with the Reno Aces in 2017
- Outfielder
- Born: August 14, 1987 (age 39); Muncie, Indiana, U.S.
- Batted: Left Threw: Right

Professional debut
- MLB: April 3, 2016, for the St. Louis Cardinals
- KBO: March 23, 2019, for the Kia Tigers

Last appearance
- MLB: October 1, 2017, for the Arizona Diamondbacks
- KBO: April 4, 2019, for the Kia Tigers

MLB statistics
- Batting average: .258
- Home runs: 14
- Runs batted in: 38

KBO statistics
- Batting average: .146
- Home runs: 2
- Runs batted in: 5
- Stats at Baseball Reference

Teams
- St. Louis Cardinals (2016); Arizona Diamondbacks (2017); Kia Tigers (2019)

Jeremy Philip Hazelbaker (born August 14, 1987) is an American former professional baseball outfielder. He played in Major League Baseball (MLB) for the St. Louis Cardinals and Arizona Diamondbacks, and in the KBO League for the Kia Tigers.

== Professional career ==
=== Boston Red Sox ===
Hazelbaker was selected by the Boston Red Sox in the fourth round of the 2009 MLB draft out of Ball State University. He opened 2009 with the Low-A Lowell Spinners, before being promoted to the Single-A Greenville Drive (2009–10), High-A Salem Red Sox (2011), Double-A Portland Sea Dogs (2011–12), and Triple-A Pawtucket Red Sox (2012). He batted a combined .259/.345/.434 line with 49 home runs and 157 stolen bases in 409 games. Hazelbaker returned to Pawtucket in 2013. He posted a .257/.313/3.74 line with 11 home runs and 54 RBI in 121 games, including 62 runs scored, 37 stolen bases, and 26 extra bases.

=== Los Angeles Dodgers ===
On October 23, 2013, Hazelbaker was traded to the Los Angeles Dodgers in exchange for Alex Castellanos. He was assigned to the Double-A Chattanooga Lookouts. In 2014, he was selected for the mid-season Southern League All-Star Game. In 87 games with the Lookouts and another 22 with the Triple-A Albuquerque Isotopes, he hit .244. He was assigned to the Double-A Tulsa Drillers of the Texas League to start the 2015 season. He hit .245 in 14 games before being released by the organization on May 1, 2015.

=== St. Louis Cardinals ===
On May 13, 2015, Hazelbaker signed a minor league contract with the St. Louis Cardinals organization and was assigned to the Double-A Springfield Cardinals. In 40 games with Springfield, Hazelbaker batted .308 with 19 extra-base hits. The Cardinals then promoted him to the Triple-A Memphis Redbirds of the Pacific Coast League (PCL). He was named PCL Player of the Week on July 13, 2015, after leading the league in total bases, extra-base hits, and RBI. At Memphis, he played in 58 games, batting .333 with 10 home runs and 46 RBI.

==== Major League debut (2016) ====
On March 31, 2016, the Cardinals announced Hazelbaker had made the major league roster; he played primarily as a backup outfielder and pinch hitter. He made his major league debut on April 3 as a pinch hitter against the Pittsburgh Pirates after 751 games in the minor leagues. His hitting performances in the first two weeks of the season thus caught national headlines. Hazelbaker's first MLB hit was a double on April 5 and the first home run was the next day; both hits were against the Pittsburgh Pirates.

On April 8, Hazelbaker's second major league home run became part of a unique event in major league history. Playing against the Atlanta Braves, he, Aledmys Díaz, and Greg Garcia established a new MLB record by each hitting a pinch-hit home run, becoming the first trio to hit three pinch-hit home runs in one game for the same team. The previous record of two pinch-hit home runs by the same team in the same game had previously occurred on 57 occasions, most recently in 2011. The Cardinals won this contest, 7–4. That home run also gave him two in his first four career games, joining Joe Cunningham (1954) as the only Cardinals to accomplish the feat. His first career four-hit game, including his first career triple, came in a 10–1 victory over the Milwaukee Brewers on April 11. In the month of April, he batted .317, .357 OBP, .683 SLG, five home runs, and 13 RBI.

The Cardinals optioned Hazelbaker to Memphis on June 15, 2016, after hitting .250 with seven home runs and 19 RBI. During a game against the New Orleans Zephyrs on June 28, Hazelbaker was instantly ejected when he charged the mound for José Ureña, who had nearly hit him in the head. Hazelbaker also flipped his bat and avoided a left punch from Ureña. After playing 13 games for Memphis and batting .325 with one home run and 11 RBI, St. Louis recalled Hazelbaker on July 19, 2016. He finished his rookie season batting .235/.295/.480 with 12 home runs and 28 RBI.

=== Arizona Diamondbacks ===
On November 4, 2016, the Arizona Diamondbacks claimed Hazelbaker off waivers. He split the 2017 season between the Triple-A Reno Aces and Arizona, logging a .279/.341/495 slash line in 52 games for Reno. In 41 games for the Diamondbacks, Hazelbaker hit .346/.443/.577 with two home runs and 10 RBI.

Hazelbaker was assigned to Triple-A Reno to begin the 2018 season. Hazelbaker was designated for assignment by the Diamondbacks on April 6, 2018, following the acquisition of Troy Scribner.

=== Tampa Bay Rays ===
On April 10, 2018, Hazelbaker was claimed off waivers by the Tampa Bay Rays and optioned to the Triple-A Durham Bulls. In 62 games for Durham, Hazelbaker slashed .210/.293/.397 with 8 home runs and 27 RBI. On July 6, 2018, Hazelbaker was designated for assignment by Tampa Bay. He was outrighted to Durham on July 9.

=== Minnesota Twins ===
On July 19, 2018, Hazelbaker was traded to the Minnesota Twins in exchange for cash considerations. He was assigned to the Triple-A Rochester Red Wings, where he batted .188/.310/.365 with 3 home runs and 9 RBI. Hazelbaker elected free agency following the season on November 2.

=== Kia Tigers ===
On November 18, 2018, Hazelbaker signed with the Kia Tigers of the KBO League. He was released after batting just .146/.239/.341 with no home runs in 11 games on May 10, 2019.

=== Sioux City Explorers ===
On July 28, 2019, Hazelbaker signed with the Sioux City Explorers of the independent American Association. He played 35 games with Sioux City, slashing .248/.353/.421. Hazelbaker was released by the team on March 13, 2020.
