= Alex Castellanos (baseball) =

American baseball player (born 1986)

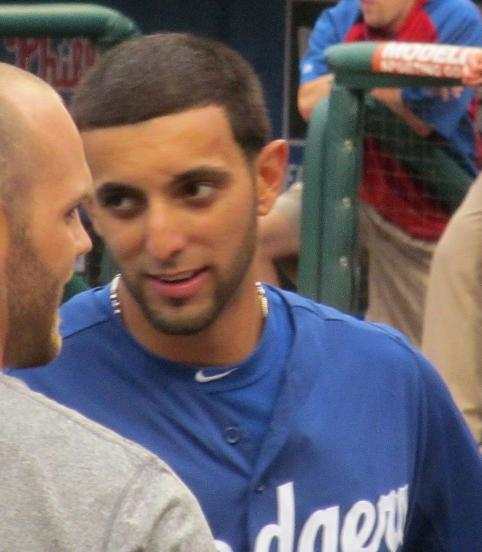
- Castellanos with the Los Angeles Dodgers in 2012
- Outfielder
- Born: August 4, 1986 (age 39); Miami, Florida, U.S.
- Batted: Right Threw: Right

Professional debut
- MLB: May 31, 2012, for the Los Angeles Dodgers
- NPB: July 31, 2015, for the Yomiuri Giants

Last appearance
- MLB: September 29, 2013, for the Los Angeles Dodgers
- NPB: August 7, 2015, for the Yomiuri Giants

MLB statistics
- Batting average: .171
- Home runs: 2
- Runs batted in: 4

NPB statistics
- Batting average: .100
- Home runs: 0
- Runs batted in: 1
- Stats at Baseball Reference

Teams
- Los Angeles Dodgers (2012–2013); Yomiuri Giants (2015)

Alejandro Luis Castellanos (born August 4, 1986) is an American former professional baseball outfielder. He played in Major League Baseball (MLB) for the Los Angeles Dodgers, and in Nippon Professional Baseball (NPB) for the Yomiuri Giants.

== Career ==
=== College ===
He attended Belmont Abbey College, where he hit .390 with a Division II leading 31 doubles in 2008 to earn All-Region honors. Was also an All-American and All-Region selection as a Freshman.

=== St. Louis Cardinals ===
Castellanos was drafted by the St. Louis Cardinals in the 10th round, with the 305th overall selection, of the 2008 Major League Baseball draft, becoming the first Belmont Abbey player to be drafted since 1972.

He began his career as an infielder in the rookie leagues and then moved to the outfield in 2010 with the Palm Beach Cardinals. He began 2011 with the Double–A Springfield Cardinals, where he hit .319 in 93 games with 19 home runs and 62 RBI and was selected as a Texas League mid-season All-Star.

=== Los Angeles Dodgers ===
On July 31, 2011, Castellanos was traded to the Los Angeles Dodgers in exchange for Rafael Furcal, and hit .322 for the Dodgers Double–A affiliate, the Chattanooga Lookouts in 32 games. He was added to the 40-man roster after the season to protect him from the Rule 5 draft and was promoted to the Triple–A Albuquerque Isotopes to start 2012, where the Dodgers started playing him more at second base.

On May 31, 2012, Castellanos was promoted to the major leagues for the first time, replacing an injured Matt Kemp on the active roster. He made his debut as a defensive replacement in the eighth inning and was later hit by a pitch in his first at-bat. Castellanos started the next game against the Colorado Rockies and recorded his first hit, an RBI triple. He hit his first Major League home run in his final at-bat of the season, on October 3 against Jean Machi of the San Francisco Giants. In the 2012 season, he played in 94 games for the Isotopes, hitting .326 with 17 homers and 52 RBI, and 16 games with the Dodgers, hitting .174.

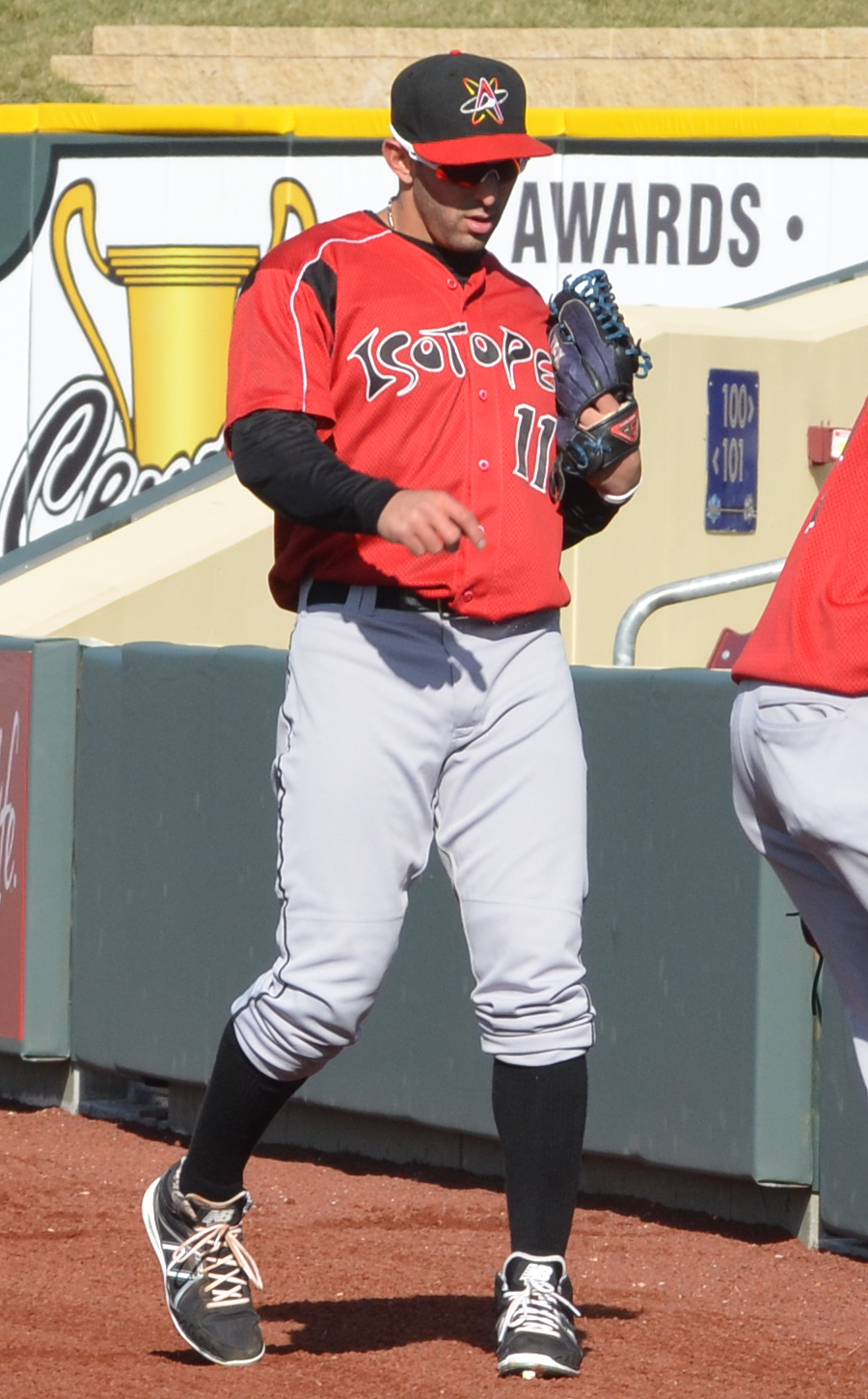
Castellanos playing for the Albuquerque Isotopes, triple-A affiliates of the Los Angeles Dodgers, in 2013

In 2013, he only played in eight games in the Majors, with 3 hits in 18 at-bats, including a home run. At Triple–A Albuquerque, he appeared in 104 games and hit .257 with 19 homers and 61 RBI. The team abandoned the plan to turn him into an infielder, as they had attempted the previous year, and he played in the outfield the whole season.

Castellanos was designated for assignment by the Dodgers on October 17, 2013.

=== San Diego Padres ===
On October 23, 2013, Castellanos was traded to the Boston Red Sox in exchange for outfielder Jeremy Hazelbaker. On December 12, he was designated for assignment in order to make room for Mike Napoli on the roster. On December 23, Castellanos was claimed off waivers by the Texas Rangers. The Rangers designated him for assignment on March 5, 2014, in order to make room for Joe Saunders. On March 7, Castellanos was claimed off waivers by the San Diego Padres. He was designated for assignment by San Diego on April 25. Castellanos cleared waivers this time and was ultimately sent outright to the Triple–A El Paso Chihuahuas.

=== New York Mets ===
On November 11, 2014, the New York Mets signed Castellanos to a minor league contract that included an invitation to spring training. Castellanos made 79 appearances for the Triple-A Las Vegas 51s, batting .314/.381/.614 with 16 home runs, 56 RBI, and five stolen bases.

=== Yomiuri Giants ===
On July 28, 2015, Castellanos joined Yomiuri Giants of Nippon Professional Baseball (NPB) as an outfielder and was given the number 93.

=== Colorado Rockies ===
On December 28, 2015, Castellanos signed a minor league contract with the Colorado Rockies. He played in 49 games for the Triple–A Albuquerque Isotopes, hitting .299/.364/.482 with six home runs and 25 RBI. Castellanos elected free agency following the season on November 7, 2016.

=== Baltimore Orioles ===
On January 24, 2017, Castellanos signed a minor league contract with the Baltimore Orioles organization. In 25 games for the Triple–A Norfolk Tides, Castellanos hit .141/.212/.256 with 2 home runs and 5 RBI. He elected free agency following the season on November 6.

=== Somerset Patriots ===
On March 21, 2018, Castellanos signed with the Somerset Patriots of the Atlantic League of Professional Baseball. In 25 games for Somerset, he slashed .272/.327/.424 with four home runs and 17 RBI. Castellanos became a free agent following the 2018 season.
