= Michael Antonini =

American baseball player (born 1985)

- Pitcher
- Born: August 6, 1985 (age 40); Drexel Hill, Pennsylvania, U.S.
- Bats: Right Throws: Left
- Stats at Baseball Reference

Michael John Antonini (born August 6, 1985) is an American former professional baseball pitcher. He is currently a phantom ballplayer, having spent multiple stints on the active roster of the Los Angeles Dodgers without appearing in a game.

Antonini played amateur baseball at Cardinal O'Hara High School, Georgia College & State University, and Gloucester County College. He was originally drafted by the Philadelphia Phillies in the 41st round of the 2006 MLB draft but did not sign and was later drafted by the New York Mets in the 18th round of the 2007 MLB draft.

== Career ==
=== New York Mets ===
Antonini signed with the Mets in 2007 and made his professional debut with their rookie-level affiliate, the Kingsport Mets, that year. After a few starts he was promoted to the Low-A Brooklyn Cyclones. Antonini split 2008 between the Single-A Savannah Sand Gnats and High-A St. Lucie Mets. He spent most of 2009 with the Double-A Binghamton Mets, where he was 7–5 with a 5.32 ERA and 86 strikeouts in 25 appearances (20 starts). In 2010, Antonini logged a 6–9 record with a 4.32 ERA and 106 strikeouts in 23 starts for Binghamton. This let go him receiving a promotion to the Triple-A Buffalo Bisons, where he started six games late in the year and was 2–3 with a 5.11 ERA and 25 strikeouts.

=== Los Angeles Dodgers ===
Antonini was traded to the Los Angeles Dodgers on December 27, 2010, in exchange for Chin-lung Hu. With the Dodgers organization in 2011, he made 27 starts for the Double-A Chattanooga Lookouts and was 10–9 with a 4.01 ERA and 131 strikeouts. He played in the mid-season Southern League All-Star Game and was added to the Dodgers' 40-man roster after the season to protect him from the Rule 5 Draft.

Antonini was promoted to the Triple-A Albuquerque Isotopes to start the 2012 campaign. On April 24, 2012, Antonini was promoted to the major leagues for the first time when Matt Guerrier was placed on the disabled list; however, Antonini was optioned back to the minors on April 27 without appearing in any games. On May 28, he was recalled to replace the injured Ted Lilly, but returned to Triple-A one day later, again without appearing in a game. Antonini was designated for assignment by the Dodgers on July 31, and removed from their 40-man roster. Because Antonini has spent time on an active MLB roster without ever appearing in an MLB game (to date), he is an example of a "phantom ballplayer." Antonini later cleared waivers and was sent outright to the Isotopes. He pitched in 30 games in Albuquerque, including 13 starts, and finished the season with a 2–7 record and 5.71 ERA and 57 strikeouts. Antonini was released by the Dodgers organization on March 27, 2013.

=== Camden Riversharks ===
Antonini signed with the Camden Riversharks of the Atlantic League of Professional Baseball for the 2013 season. He appeared in 13 games (one start) for the Riversharks, for whom he pitched to an 0–1 record and 7.84 ERA with 15 strikeouts across 20 2/3 innings pitched.

=== New Jersey Jackals ===
Antonini played with the New Jersey Jackals of the Canadian American Association of Professional Baseball in 2014. He broke the Can-Am League record for most strikeouts in a game with 15 on July 12, 2014, against the Lincoln Saltdogs. For the season, he played in 19 games (all starts), compiling a 9–3 record and 2.84 ERA with 115 strikeouts across 117 1/3 innings pitched.

=== Bridgeport Bluefish ===
Antonini began the 2015 season with the Bridgeport Bluefish of the Atlantic League of Professional Baseball. In 11 starts for Bridgeport, Antonini accumulated a 4-5 record and 2.79 ERA with 62 strikeouts across 67 2/3 innings pitched.

=== Los Angeles Angels ===
On July 2, 2015, Antonini signed a minor league contract with the Los Angeles Angels organization. He made four starts for the Double-A Arkansas Travelers, posting a 1-1 record and 4.95 ERA with 19 strikeouts over 20 innings of work. Antonini elected free agency following the season on November 6.

=== Bridgeport Bluefish (second stint) ===
Antonini returned to the Bridgeport Bluefish of the Atlantic League for the 2016 season; in 17 starts for the team, he compiled a 4-7 record and 3.92 ERA with 59 strikeouts across 87 1/3 innings pitched.

=== Somerset Patriots ===
For the 2017 season, Antonini signed with the Somerset Patriots of the Atlantic League of Professional Baseball. He made nine starts for the team, registering a 2-1 record and 1.62 ERA with 47 strikeouts over 39 innings of work.

Antonini shifted to relief work in 2018, making 41 appearances out of the bullpen for Somerset; in those games, he logged a 3-2 record and 1.41 ERA with 56 strikeouts across 51 innings pitched.

Antonini began the 2019 season back with Somerset, and recorded a 2.17 ERA with 25 saves in his first 31 games.

=== Pericos de Puebla ===
On July 12, 2019, Antonini's contract was purchased by the Pericos de Puebla of the Mexican League. He made 26 appearances for Puebla, posting an 0-1 record and 4.87 ERA with 19 strikeouts and one save across 20 1/3 innings pitched. Antonini was released by the Pericos on September 2.

=== Somerset Patriots (second stint) ===
On September 3, 2019, Antonini re-signed with the Somerset Patriots of the Atlantic League of Professional Baseball. He made 38 relief appearances for the Patriots during the 2019 season, compiling a 2-4 record and 2.75 ERA with 36 strikeouts and 29 saves across 36 innings of work. Antonini became a free agent following the season.
