= Josh Wall =

American baseball player (born 1987)

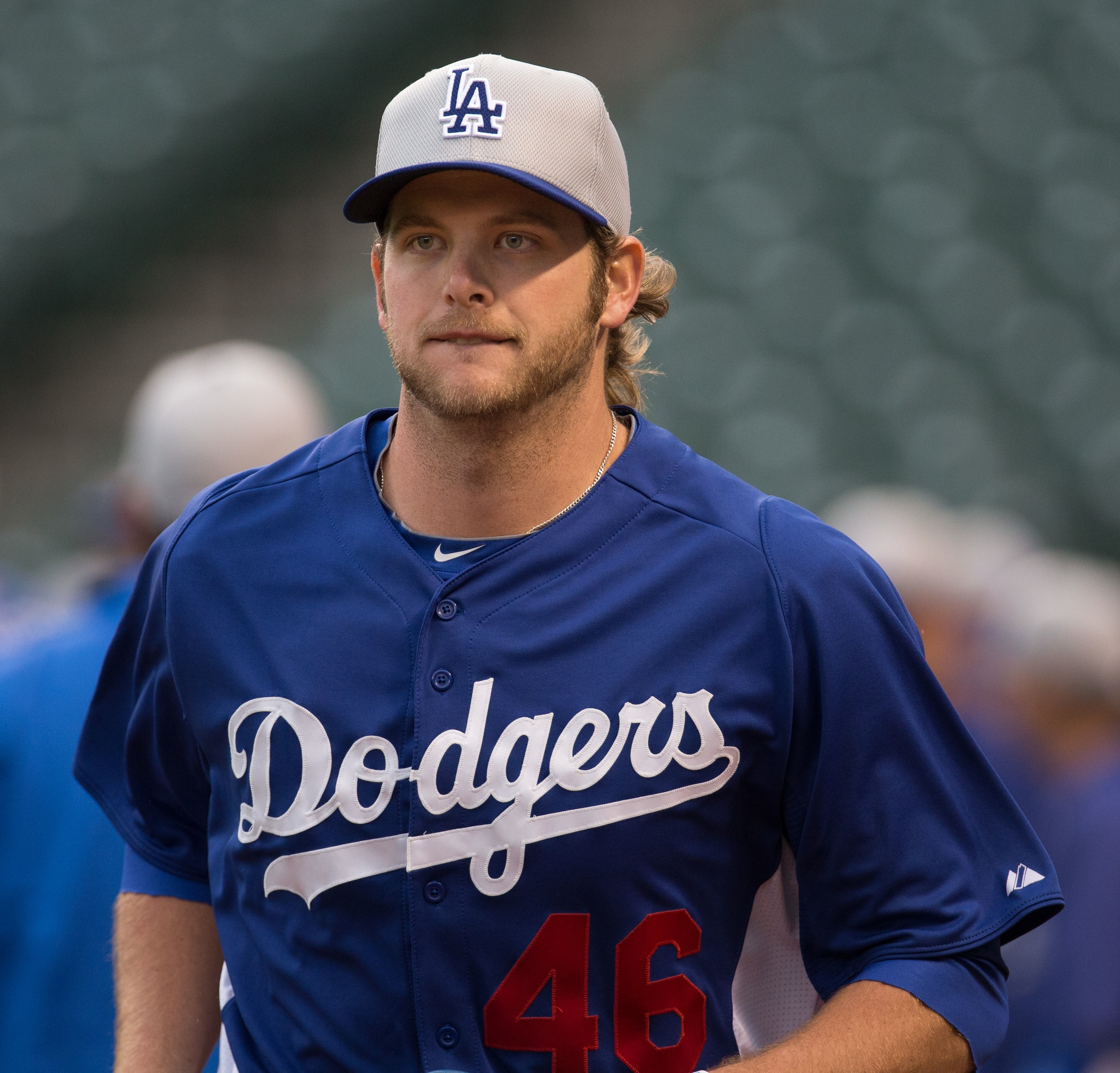
- Wall with the Los Angeles Dodgers
- Relief pitcher
- Born: January 21, 1987 (age 39); Walker, Louisiana, U.S.
- Batted: Right Threw: Right

MLB debut
- July 22, 2012, for the Los Angeles Dodgers

Last MLB appearance
- April 19, 2014, for the Los Angeles Angels of Anaheim

MLB statistics
- Win–loss record: 1–1
- Earned run average: 15.15
- Strikeouts: 11
- Stats at Baseball Reference

Teams
- Los Angeles Dodgers (2012–2013); Los Angeles Angels of Anaheim (2014)

Joshua Michael Wall (born January 21, 1987) is an American former professional baseball pitcher. He was drafted by the Los Angeles Dodgers in the 2nd round of the 2005 MLB draft out of Central Private School in Central, Louisiana, where he was a second team High School All-American. He has played in MLB for the Dodgers and Los Angeles Angels of Anaheim.

== Career ==
=== Los Angeles Dodgers ===
With the Dodgers organization, he played in the rookie leagues in 2005 and 2006 and spent the next four seasons (2007–2010) in Class-A with the Great Lakes Loons and Inland Empire 66ers of San Bernardino. After being used exclusively as a starting pitcher for his first six seasons in the system, in 2011 he was switched to the bullpen and promoted to the AA Chattanooga Lookouts, where he was 4–5 with a 3.93 ERA in 51 games. He was added to the 40-man roster after the season to protect him from the Rule 5 draft. In 2012, he was promoted to the Triple-A Albuquerque Isotopes and was selected to the Pacific Coast League mid-season All-Star team and the post-season All-PCL team. In 55 total games with the Isotopes, he was 2–1 with a 4.53 ERA and 28 saves.

He was promoted to the Major Leagues for the first time when the Dodgers called him up on July 14, 2012. Wall made his Major League debut when he pitched a scoreless eleventh inning against the New York Mets on July 22 and picked up the win. He appeared in seven games for the Dodgers in 2012, with a 1–0 record and 4.76 ERA. He also appeared in 6 games for the Dodgers in 2013, with an ERA of 18.00. In 25 games for AAA Albuquerque in 2013 he has a 1-2 record, 5.60 ERA and 3 saves.

=== Miami Marlins ===
On July 6, 2013 he was traded to the Miami Marlins (along with Steve Ames and Ángel Sánchez) in exchange for Ricky Nolasco. He was assigned to the Triple–A New Orleans Zephyrs and appeared in 20 games for them, with a 3.27 ERA. He never played for the Marlins.

=== Los Angeles Angels of Anaheim ===
Wall was claimed off waivers by the Los Angeles Angels of Anaheim on October 4, 2013.

=== Pittsburgh Pirates ===
On May 22, 2014, Wall was claimed by the Pittsburgh Pirates off waivers from the Angels, and optioned to the Triple-A Indianapolis Indians. He signed a minor league contract to remain with Pittsburgh on January 30, 2015.

=== Chicago White Sox ===
On December 28, 2015, Wall signed a minor league contract with the Chicago White Sox. He was released by the White Sox organization on April 11, 2016.

=== Lancaster Barnstormers ===
On May 3, 2016, Wall signed with the Lancaster Barnstormers of the Atlantic League of Professional Baseball. Wall announced his retirement on June 29.
