= Elián Herrera (baseball) =

Dominican baseball player (born 1985)

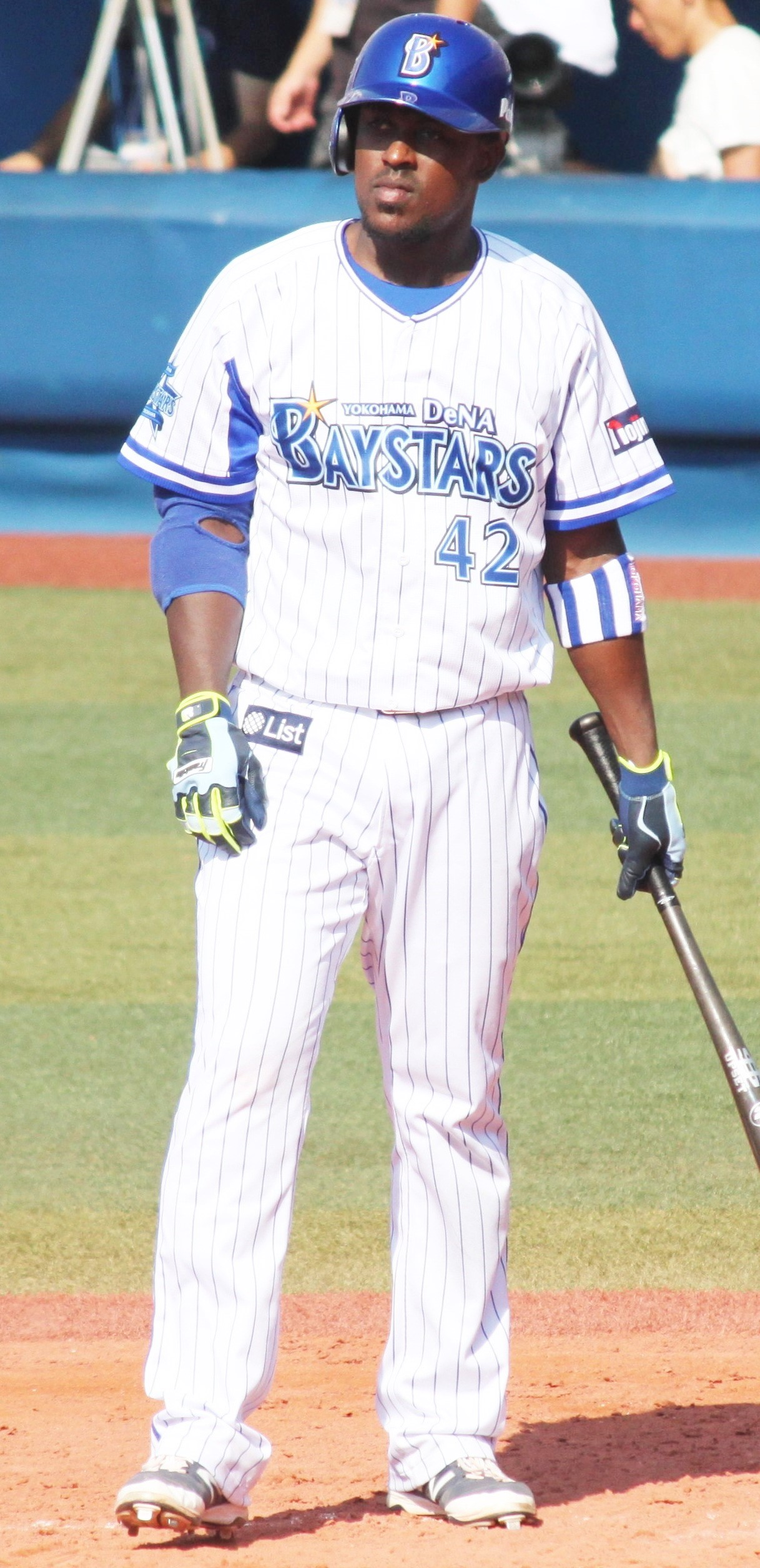
- Herrera with the Yokohama DeNA BayStars
- Utility player
- Born: February 1, 1985 (age 41); San Pedro de Macoris, Dominican Republic
- Batted: Switch Threw: Right

Professional debut
- MLB: May 15, 2012, for the Los Angeles Dodgers
- NPB: June 1, 2016, for the Yokohama DeNA BayStars

Last appearance
- MLB: September 19, 2015, for the Milwaukee Brewers
- NPB: June 24, 2017, for the Yokohama DeNA BayStars

MLB statistics
- Batting average: .253
- Home runs: 8
- Runs batted in: 55

NPB statistics
- Batting average: .224
- Home runs: 6
- Runs batted in: 34
- Stats at Baseball Reference

Teams
- Los Angeles Dodgers (2012–2013); Milwaukee Brewers (2014–2015); Yokohama DeNA BayStars (2016–2017)

Elián Herrera Dominguez (born February 1, 1985) is a Dominican former professional baseball utility player. Herrera played for the Los Angeles Dodgers and Milwaukee Brewers of Major League Baseball (MLB), and the Yokohama DeNA BayStars of Nippon Professional Baseball. He played second base, third base, shortstop and all three outfield positions in his career.

== Playing career ==
=== Los Angeles Dodgers ===
A native of the Dominican Republic, Herrera signed with the Los Angeles Dodgers as an undrafted free agent in 2006 and began play with the rookie class Gulf Coast Dodgers, where he was selected as a Gulf Coast League All-Star. In 2007, he played at three levels, with the rookie–level Ogden Raptors, Single–A Great Lakes Loons and High–A Inland Empire 66ers of San Bernardino. Overall, he appeared in 70 games and hit .255. He appeared in only 37 games in 2008, for the same three teams, and hit .292.

In 2010, Herrera played in 97 games for the Double–A Chattanooga Lookouts, hitting .258 and also stole 31 bases. He also played in 25 games in Triple–A for the Albuquerque Isotopes, where he hit .229. For the 2011 season he played exclusively for Chattanooga, appearing in 116 games, hitting .278 and stealing 33 bases.

Herrera began the 2012 season with Albuquerque and had his contract purchased by the Dodgers when he was called up to the Majors for the first time on May 14, 2012. He made his Major League debut as a pinch hitter on May 15 against the Arizona Diamondbacks and popped out. He recorded his first hit, an RBI double, in the first inning of his first start, on May 16 against the San Diego Padres. He hit his first Major League home run on July 5, 2012, off of Wade Miley of the Diamondbacks. He appeared in 67 games with the Dodgers in 2012, batting .251

In 2013, Herrera had a couple of brief Major League call-ups but only appeared in 4 games, where he had 2 hits in 8 at-bats. He was also in 108 games at Albuquerque, where he hit .282.

=== Milwaukee Brewers ===
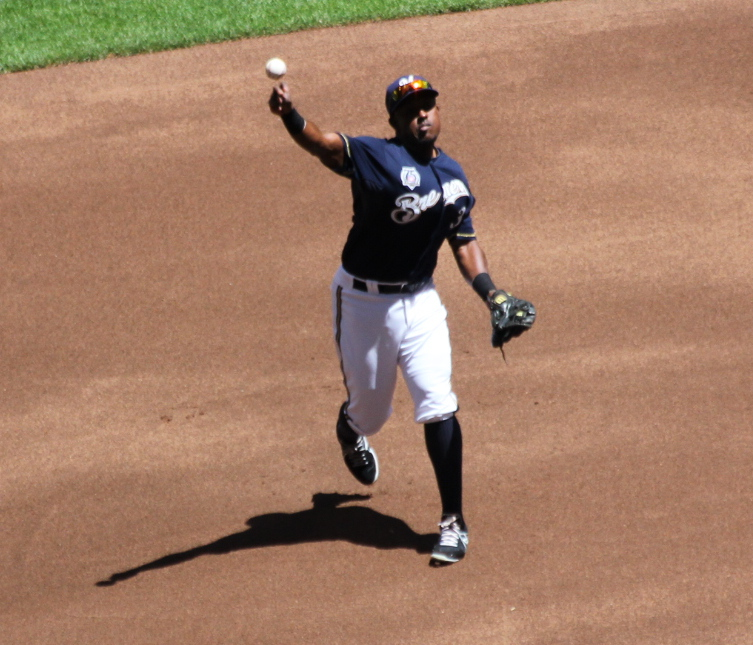
Fielding for the Milwaukee Brewers

On November 4, 2013, Herrera was claimed off waivers by the Milwaukee Brewers.

On July 13, 2014, Herrera had a career high five hits in one game against the St. Louis Cardinals. He was the sixth player to do that hitting out of the eighth spot in the last twenty years.

On June 2, 2015, Herrera was designated for assignment. On July 30, he re-joined the Brewers following the trade of Carlos Gómez and Mike Fiers to the Houston Astros. In 83 games for Milwaukee, Herrera slashed .242/.290/.395 with seven home runs and 33 RBI. On December 2, Herrera was non–tendered by the Brewers and became a free agent.

=== Los Angeles Dodgers ===
On December 26, 2015, Herrera returned to the Los Angeles Dodgers on a minor league contract. He was given a non-roster invitation to Dodgers spring training and he was assigned to the Triple-A Oklahoma City Dodgers to begin the season. He was released on May 14.

=== Yokohama DeNA BayStars ===
On June 1, 2016, Herrera signed with the Yokohama DeNA BayStars of Nippon Professional Baseball. He became a free agent after the 2017 season.

=== Diablos Rojos del México ===
On July 6, 2018, Herrera signed with the Diablos Rojos del México of the Mexican League. He was released on July 18, 2018.

== Coaching career ==
On January 16, 2019, Herrera was announced as the bench coach for the Rancho Cucamonga Quakes in the Dodgers farm system. For 2020, he was assigned to the same role for the High–A Great Lakes Loons.
