= 2013 Los Angeles Dodgers season =

2013 Los Angeles Dodgers
- National League West champions
- League: National League
- Division: West
- Ballpark: Dodger Stadium
- City: Los Angeles, California
- Record: 92–70 (.568)
- Divisional place: 1st
- Owners: Guggenheim Baseball Management
- President: Stan Kasten
- General managers: Ned Colletti
- Managers: Don Mattingly
- Television: Prime Ticket; KCAL-TV (Vin Scully, Eric Collins, Steve Lyons, Jorge Jarrín, Manny Mota)
- Radio: KLAC (Vin Scully, Charley Steiner, Rick Monday); KTNQ (Jaime Jarrín, Pepe Yñiguez, Fernando Valenzuela)

The 2013 Los Angeles Dodgers season was the 124th for the franchise in Major League Baseball, and their 56th season in Los Angeles. The Dodgers dealt with a series of injuries to key players during the first half of the season and on June 21 were 31–42, 9 1/2 games back in last place in the National League West Division. Beginning with a 6–1 win over the San Diego Padres on June 22, the return of the injured players, and the emergence of rookie Yasiel Puig, they went 46–10 through August 23 as the rest of the division collapsed. On September 19, they clinched the National League West title. This was the earliest the Dodgers had ever clinched a title and the largest deficit they had ever overcome to win the division. They opened the playoffs by defeating the Atlanta Braves in the NLDS and advanced to the NLCS. In the NLCS, they lost to the St. Louis Cardinals in six games.

The season also marked the end of the Dodgers games on Fox Sports West 2/Prime Ticket, as they signed a lucrative contract with Spectrum to have an exclusive Dodgers-only channel called SportsNet LA.

== Offseason ==
=== Coaching staff ===
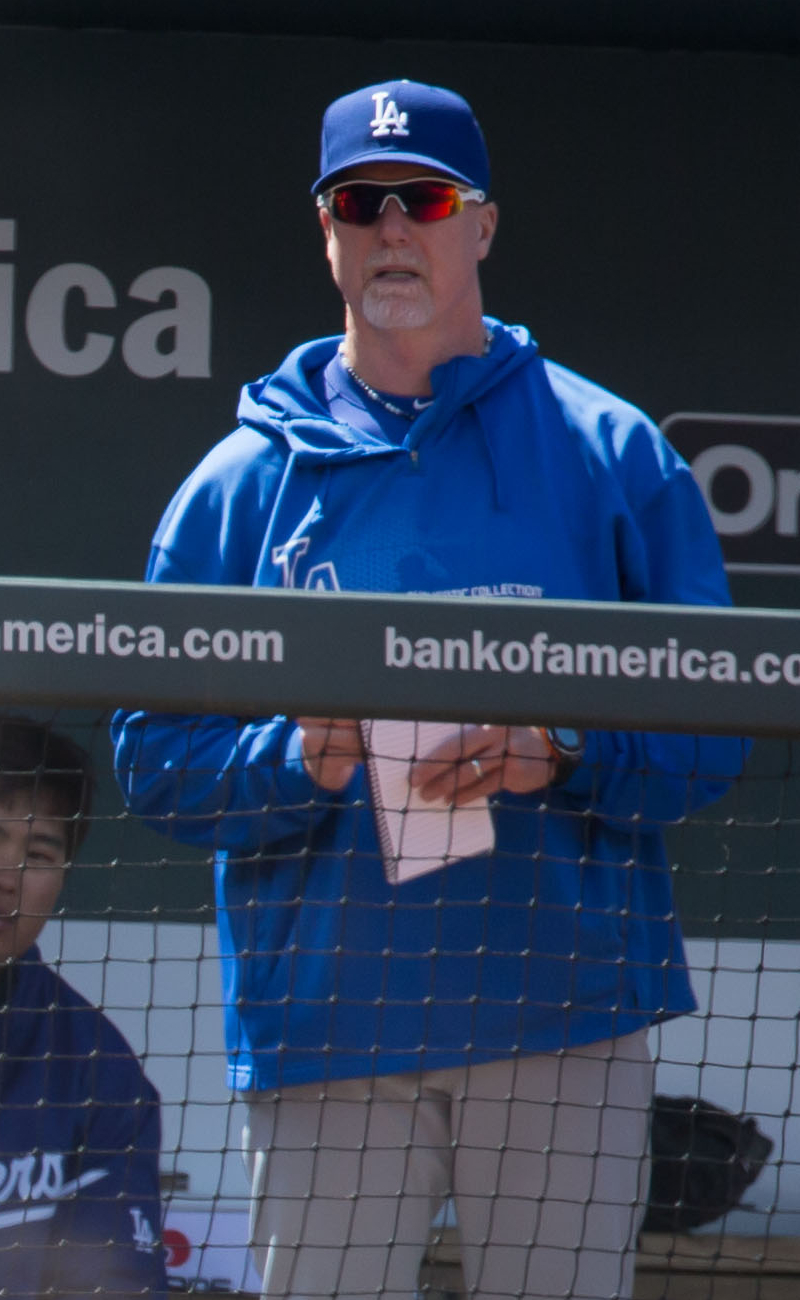
Mark McGwire became the Dodgers new hitting coach for 2013.

The Dodgers fired hitting coach Dave Hansen after the 2012 season but retained the rest of their coaching staff for 2013. On November 7, the Dodgers hired Mark McGwire (pictured at right) to be the new hitting coach. On November 13, the Dodgers promoted bullpen coach Ken Howell to assistant pitching coach and named Chuck Crim as the new bullpen coach. They also named John Valentin as assistant hitting coach.

=== Departing players ===
After the 2012 season several Dodgers players became free agents: pitchers Joe Blanton, Randy Choate, Brandon League and Jamey Wright, infielder Adam Kennedy and outfielders Shane Victorino and Bobby Abreu. The Dodgers also declined the 2013 contract options for pitcher Todd Coffey, backup catcher Matt Treanor and outfielder/first baseman Juan Rivera, making them free agents.

=== Player signings ===
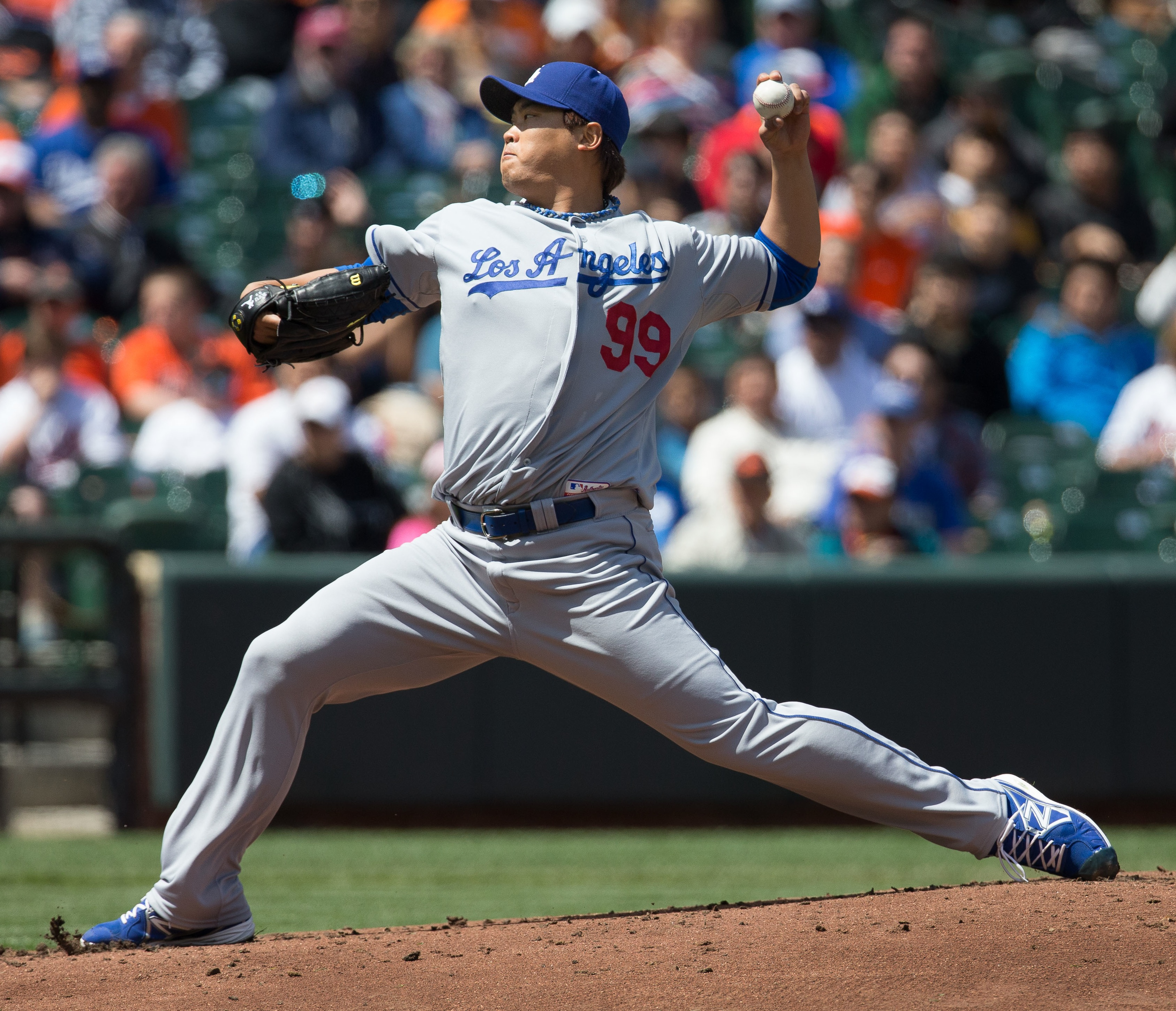
Korean pitcher Hyun-jin Ryu was signed by the Dodgers to a 6-year $36 million contract

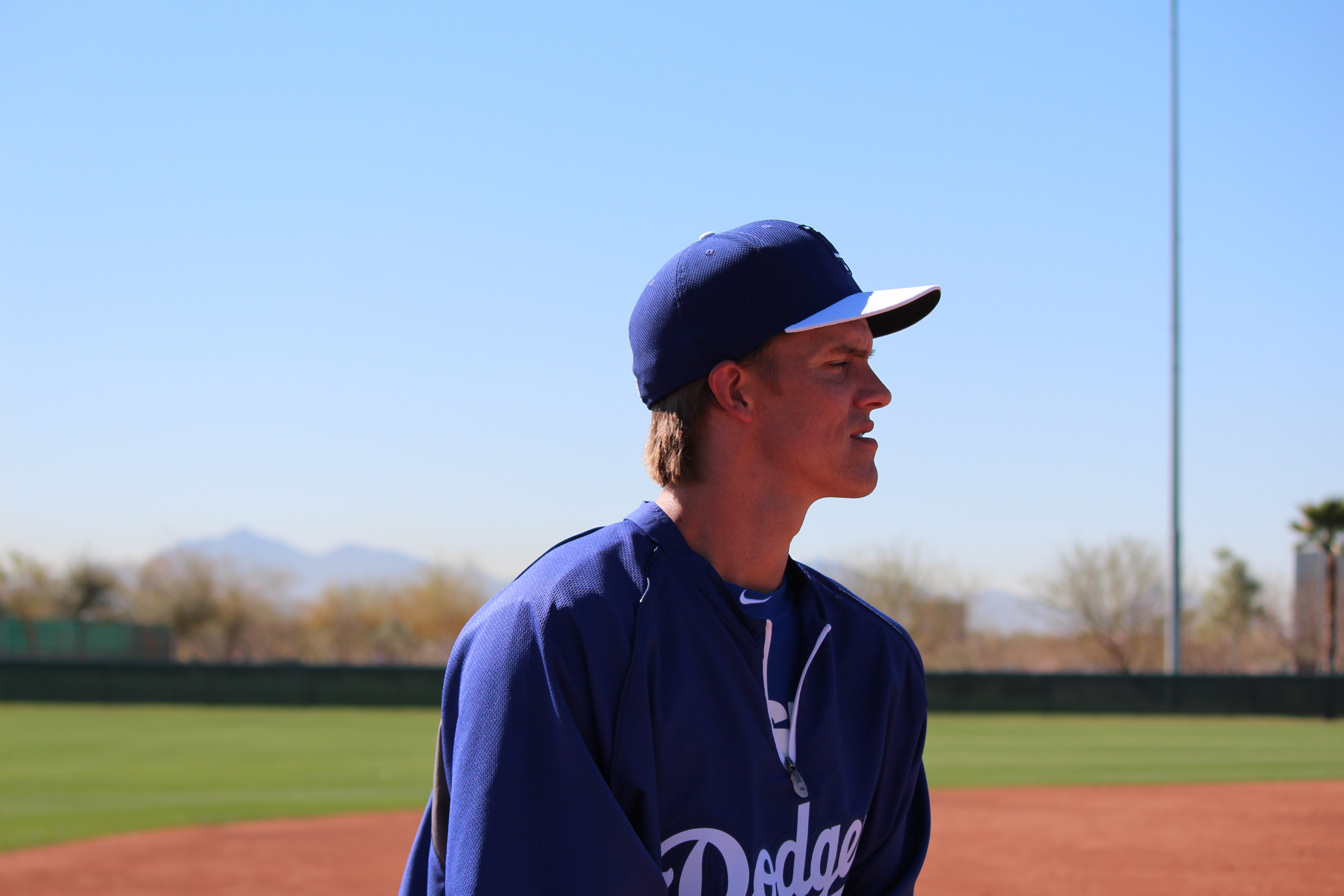
The Dodgers signed Zack Greinke to a 6-year $147 million contract, the richest ever for a right-handed starter to that point

The Dodgers began their offseason by re-signing closer Brandon League to a three-year, $22.5 million contract. On December 9, the Dodgers signed pitcher Hyun-jin Ryu to a six-year, $36 million contract after winning his rights from the Hanwha Eagles in the Korea Baseball Organization. The Dodgers, on December 10, signed the top free agent pitcher, Zack Greinke, to a six-year, $147 million contract, the largest ever awarded to a right-handed pitcher. They signed left-handed relief pitcher J. P. Howell to a one-year, $2.75 million contract on January 8.

=== Trades ===
On December 12, the Dodgers acquired utility player Skip Schumaker from the St. Louis Cardinals for minor league shortstop Jake Lemmerman. On December 19, they traded RHP John Ely to the Houston Astros in exchange for minor league LHP Rob Rasmussen.

== Spring training ==
Spring training began for the Dodgers on February 12, when pitchers and catchers reported to the team's spring training facility at Camelback Ranch in Glendale, Arizona. The Dodgers went into spring training with the lineup fairly set but a few issues remained to be worked out. The Dodgers had eight pitchers Clayton Kershaw, Chad Billingsley, Zack Greinke, Josh Beckett, Chris Capuano, Aaron Harang, Ted Lilly and Hyun-jin Ryu vying for five spots in the starting rotation.

Several Dodgers players participated in the 2013 World Baseball Classic held during spring training. Kenley Jansen played for the Netherlands, Ronald Belisario for Venezuela, Nick Punto for Italy, Luis Cruz and Adrián González for Mexico, and Hanley Ramírez for the Dominican Republic, as well as minor leaguers Andres Santiago and Mario Santiago for Puerto Rico and Felipe Burin for Brazil.

In the WBC Championship game, Ramírez injured his hand while diving for a ball. An MRI the next day revealed a torn thumb ligament that required surgery. The Dodgers announced that he would miss the first two months of the season while recovering.

One of the big stories of spring training was the play of Cuban defector Yasiel Puig. He hit .526 in Cactus League games and there was talk that he might be able to make the opening day roster, despite being a "very raw" talent who had only briefly played in Class-A the year before. However, the club sent him to AA Chattanooga to start the season.

== Regular season ==
=== Season standings ===
==== National League West ====
NL West
Team	W	L	Pct.	GB	Home	Road
Los Angeles Dodgers	92	70	.568	—	47‍–‍34	45‍–‍36
Arizona Diamondbacks	81	81	.500	11	45‍–‍36	36‍–‍45
San Diego Padres	76	86	.469	16	45‍–‍36	31‍–‍50
San Francisco Giants	76	86	.469	16	42‍–‍40	34‍–‍46
Colorado Rockies	74	88	.457	18	45‍–‍36	29‍–‍52

=== National League Wild Card ===
Wild Card Standings and Record vs. Opponents

Division winners
Team	W	L	Pct.
St. Louis Cardinals	97	65	.599
Atlanta Braves	96	66	.593
Los Angeles Dodgers	92	70	.568

Wild Card teams (Top 2 teams qualify for postseason)
Team	W	L	Pct.	GB
Pittsburgh Pirates	94	68	.580	+4
Cincinnati Reds	90	72	.556	—
Washington Nationals	86	76	.531	4
Arizona Diamondbacks	81	81	.500	9
San Francisco Giants	76	86	.469	14
San Diego Padres	76	86	.469	14
Colorado Rockies	74	88	.457	16
New York Mets	74	88	.457	16
Milwaukee Brewers	74	88	.457	16
Philadelphia Phillies	73	89	.451	17
Chicago Cubs	66	96	.407	24
Miami Marlins	62	100	.383	28

2013 National League record Source: MLB Standings Grid – 2013
Team	AZ	ATL	CHC	CIN	COL	LAD	MIA	MIL	NYM	PHI	PIT	SD	SF	STL	WSH	AL
Arizona	—	2–4	4–3	3–4	12–7	10–9	4–2	6–1	3–4	3–4	3–3	7–12	7–12	4–3	2–4	11–9
Atlanta	4–2	—	5–1	4–3	6–1	5–2	13–6	2–4	10–9	11–8	4–3	1–5	3–4	4–3	13–6	11–9
Chicago	3–4	1–5	—	5–14	3–3	1–6	4–3	6–13	3–3	3–3	7–12	3–4	4–3	7–12	3–4	13–7
Cincinnati	4–3	3–4	14–5	—	2–4	4–3	6–1	10–9	4–2	4–2	8–11	3–3	6–1	8–11	3–4	11–9
Colorado	7–12	1–6	3–3	4–2	—	10–9	3–4	4–2	3–4	3–4	4–2	12–7	9–10	3–4	3–4	5–15
Los Angeles	9–10	2–5	6–1	3–4	9–10	—	5–2	4–2	5–1	5–2	4–2	11–8	8–11	4–3	5–1	12–8
Miami	2–4	6–13	3–4	1–6	4–3	2–5	—	1–5	11–8	7–12	2–4	3–4	4–3	2–4	5–14	9–11
Milwaukee	1–6	4–2	13–6	9–10	2–4	2–4	5–1	—	4–3	5–2	7–12	3–4	5–2	5–14	3–4	6–14
New York	4–3	9–10	3–3	2–4	4–3	1–5	8–11	3–4	—	10–9	2–5	4–3	4–2	2–5	7–12	11–9
Philadelphia	4–3	8–11	3–3	2–4	4–3	2–5	12–7	2–5	9–10	—	3–4	4–2	3–3	2–5	8–11	7–13
Pittsburgh	3–3	3–4	12–7	11–8	2–4	2–4	4–2	12–7	5–2	4–3	—	3–4	4–3	10–9	4–3	15–5
San Diego	12–7	5–1	4–3	3–3	7–12	8–11	4–3	4–3	3–4	2–4	4–3	—	8–11	2–4	2–5	8–12
San Francisco	12–7	4–3	3–4	1–6	10–9	11–8	3–4	2–5	2–4	3–3	3–4	11–8	—	2–4	3–3	6–14
St. Louis	3–4	3–4	12–7	11–8	4–3	3–4	4–2	14–5	5–2	5–2	9–10	4–2	4–2	—	6–0	10–10
Washington	4–2	6–13	4–3	4–3	4–3	1–5	14–5	4–3	12–7	11–8	3–4	5–2	3–3	0–6	—	11–9

Opening Day starters
Name	Position
Carl Crawford	Left fielder
Mark Ellis	Second baseman
Matt Kemp	Center fielder
Adrián González	First baseman
Andre Ethier	Right fielder
Luis Cruz	Third baseman
A. J. Ellis	Catcher
Justin Sellers	Shortstop
Clayton Kershaw	Starting pitcher

=== Major league debuts ===
- Hyun-jin Ryu (April 2, 2013)
- Matt Magill (April 27, 2013)
- Yasiel Puig (June 3, 2013)
- Chris Withrow (June 12, 2013)
- José Domínguez (June 30, 2013)
- Onelki García (September 11, 2013)

=== April ===
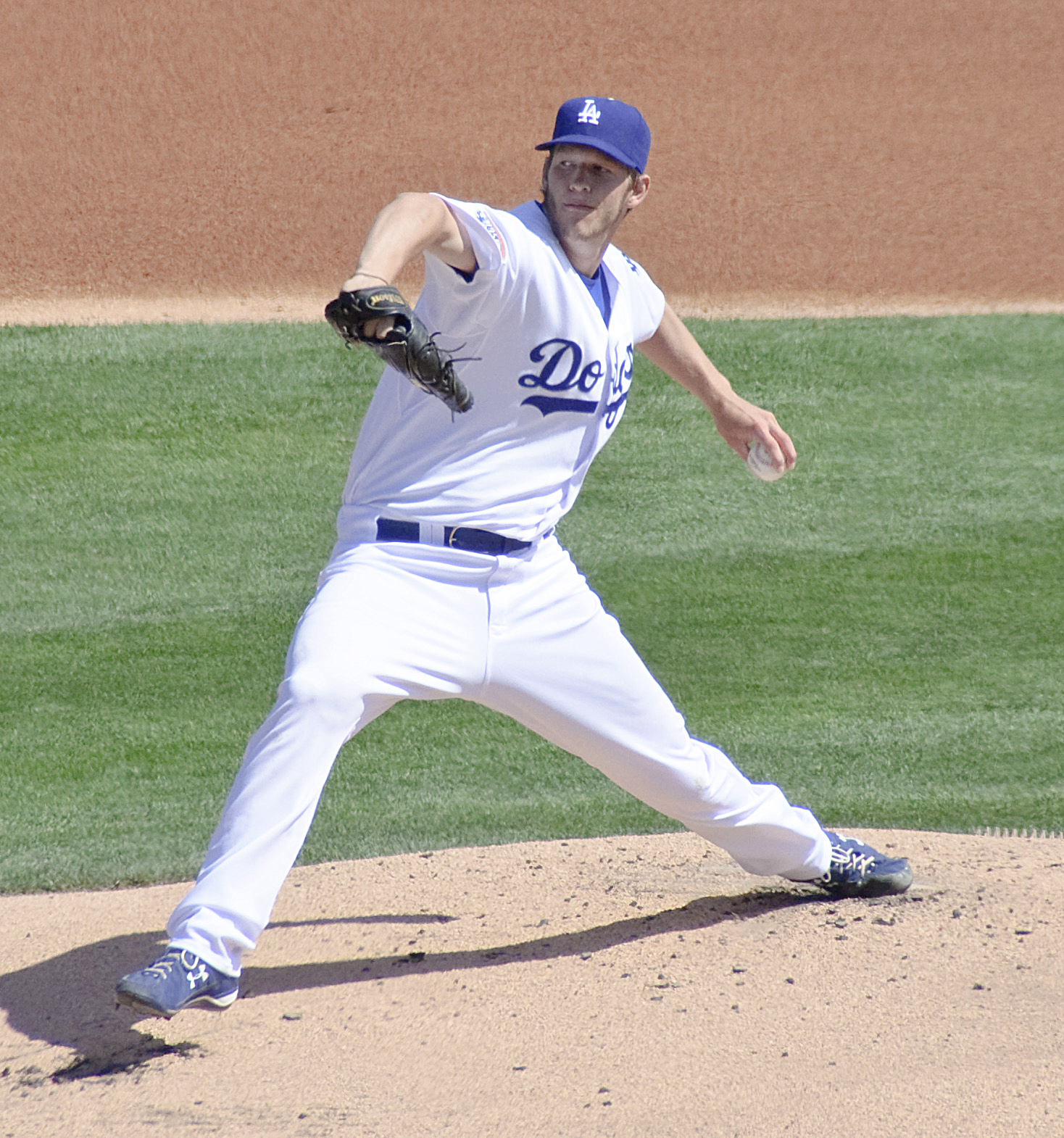
Clayton Kershaw pitched a complete game shutout on Opening Day against the Giants

The Dodgers began the regular season at home on April 1 against the San Francisco Giants. Clayton Kershaw made the opening day start for the third straight season and pitched a complete-game shutout as the Dodgers won 4–0. Kershaw also hit his first career home run in the game, for the Dodgers' first run in the bottom of the 8th. Korean pitcher Hyun-jin Ryu made his Major League debut the following day, allowing three runs (one earned) on 10 hits in 6 1/3 innings to pick up the 3–0 loss. The Dodgers went 1 for 14 with runners in scoring position in the series finale, and Pablo Sandoval and Hunter Pence hit homers off Josh Beckett as the Giants won 5–3. Zack Greinke made his Dodgers debut on April 5, pitching a two-hitter for 6 1/3 innings in the Dodgers' 3–0 win. Andre Ethier hit a solo homer in the game. In his second start of the season, Kershaw pitched seven shutout innings while striking out nine and only allowing two hits in the 1–0 victory over the Pittsburgh Pirates. The Dodgers finished off their three-game sweep of the Pirates with a 6–2 win on April 7. Adrián González had four RBI and Ryu picked up his first Major League win in the game.

The Dodgers began their first road trip of the season on April 9 at Petco Park against the San Diego Padres. The bullpen allowed 5 runs to score in the bottom of the 8th and the team lost 9–3. In Game 2 of the Padres series, Chad Billingsley made his first start of the season and allowed only one run in six innings. Carl Crawford and A. J. Ellis both homered in the 4–3 win. The Dodgers won the third game of the series, 3–2, thanks to a go-ahead pinch hit home run by Juan Uribe. However, pitcher Zack Greinke injured his left collarbone when Carlos Quentin charged the mound and tackled him to the ground after he was hit by a pitch. Kershaw pitched well again in his next start, against the Arizona Diamondbacks, but the offense failed to score and the team lost 3–0. Ryu struck out nine in six innings in his next start and also went 3 for 3 at the plate as the Dodgers beat the Diamondbacks 7–5. Josh Beckett struck out nine in the next game and pitched a complete game, but the offense failed to score and he allowed the game-winning hit by Paul Goldschmidt in the bottom of the ninth of the 1–0 loss.

The Dodgers returned home on April 15 for a Jackie Robinson Day game against the Padres. Eric Stults hit a three-run homer off Chad Billingsley and the Dodgers again were unable to get key hits and lost 6–3. Chris Capuano made his first start of the season on April 16, replacing the injured Zack Greinke in the rotation. He struggled early, allowing four runs in the first inning and then left the game in the top of the third after suffering his own injury, a strained left calf. The Dodgers lost 9–2. Kershaw picked up his 1,000th career strikeout when he fanned Yonder Alonso of the Padres in the 2nd inning on April 17. He became the youngest Dodger pitcher to reach that mark since Fernando Valenzuela. However, he struggled after that and the offense again failed to do much as the team lost 7–2. The Dodgers were swept at home by the Padres for the first time since 2006.

The Dodgers were rained out on April 19 at Camden Yards and forced to play a doubleheader the following day against the Baltimore Orioles. Their losing streak extended to six games after they lost both games of the doubleheader. In the first game, Andre Ethier hit a three-run homer in the first to stake the Dodgers to a 4–0 lead but Ryu allowed two home runs and the bullpen again failed as the team lost 7–5. Manny Machado battered Beckett for a homer, double, single and 4 RBIs in the nightcap as the Orioles won 6–1. The Dodgers woes continued when Chad Billingsley was scratched from his scheduled April 20 start and placed on the disabled list due to pain in his elbow. Stephen Fife was recalled from AAA Albuquerque to make the start. The Dodgers did manage to end the six-game losing streak with a 7–4 victory in the series finale. Mark Ellis hit two home runs in the Dodgers 7–2 victory over the New York Mets at Citi Field on April 23. Ted Lilly made his first start of the season the following day and held the Mets to 1 run on 6 hits in 5 innings while striking out 7. Matt Kemp also hit his first home run of the season. However, the Mets tied the game in the bottom of the ninth and then won it with a walk-off grand slam by Jordany Valdespin off of Josh Wall in the bottom of the 10th. The Dodgers got a two-run rally in the top of the ninth on the 25th to pick up a 3–2 win over the Mets in the final game of the road trip.

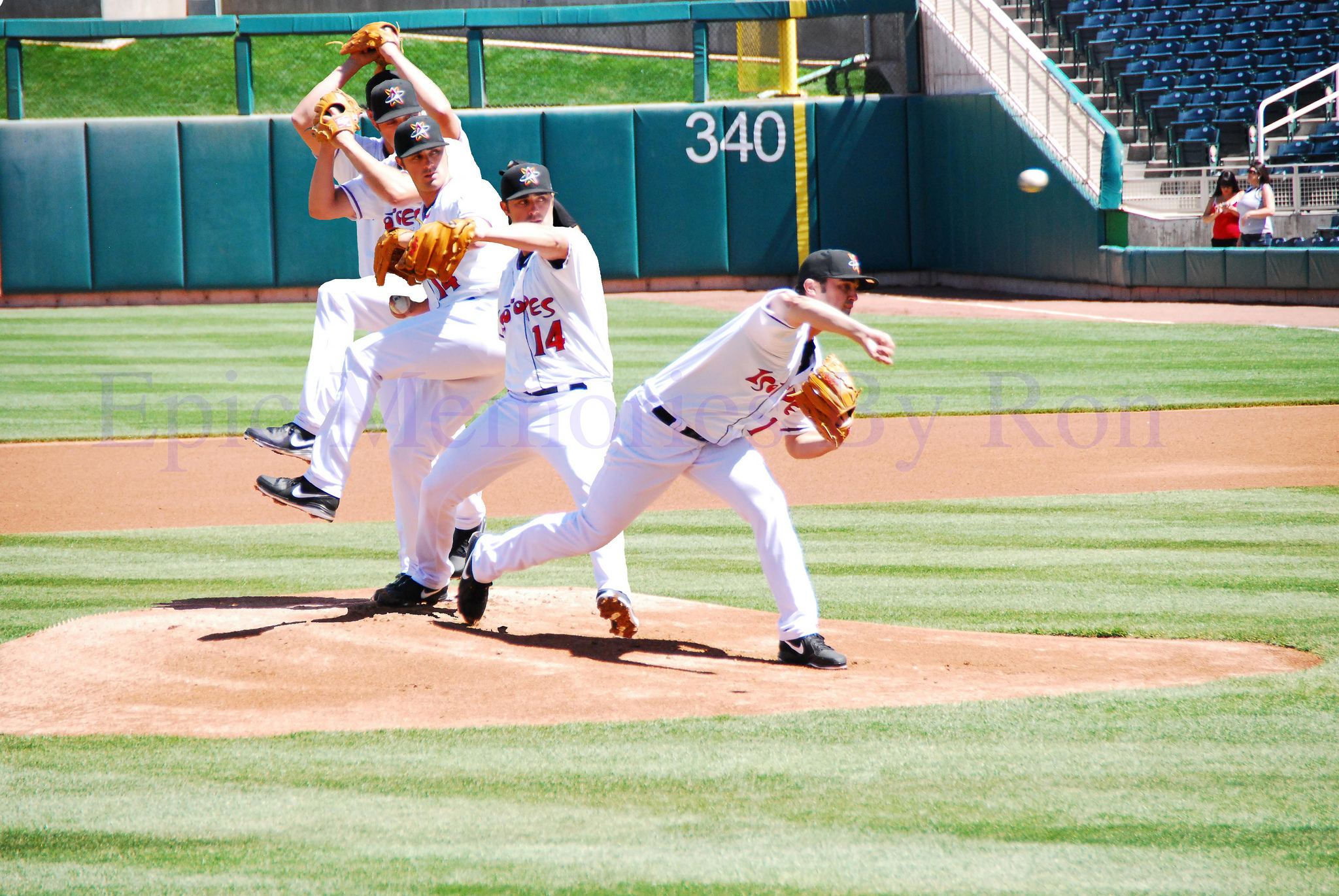
Matt Magill made his Major League debut on April 27

The Dodgers returned home on April 26 to begin a three-game weekend series with the Milwaukee Brewers. Adrián González doubled twice and drove in 3 runs in the 7–5 victory. Mark Ellis left the game after five innings because of a strained right quad. Fife was placed on the disabled list the next day and Matt Magill was called up from the minors to make his Major League debut. Magill allowed only two runs in 6 2/3 innings while striking out seven. However, Matt Guerrier allowed two home runs and they lost 6–4. Clayton Kershaw struck out 12 while pitching 8 shutout innings and Carl Crawford hit two homers as the Dodgers beat the Brewers 2–0 to win the series. Ted Lilly allowed five runs in the first three innings in his next start and Josh Wall allowed seven more in 2 innings of relief as the Dodgers were crushed by the Colorado Rockies 12–2. The Dodgers finished April with a 13–13 record after Ryu struck out 12 in 6 innings and Hanley Ramírez homered in his first start of the season after coming off the disabled list.

=== May ===
Josh Beckett fell to 0–4 on the season as the Dodgers lost to the Rockies 7–3 to start the month of May.

The Dodgers injury epidemic continued as Hanley Ramírez, after playing in just four games, injured his hamstring in the May 3 game against the San Francisco Giants at AT&T Park. Clayton Kershaw allowed only 3 hits and 1 run in 7 innings but the Giants won 2–1 on a walk-off home run by Buster Posey. The following day, Matt Magill got pounded in his second start, allowing 5 runs in only 1.1 innings. The Dodgers fell behind 6–1 but came back to tie the game, partially thanks to Dee Gordon who tripled, stole two bases and scored two runs. However, they wound up losing 10–9 on a walk-off home run by Guillermo Quiróz in the 10th inning. The Giants completed the sweep of the injury-riddled Dodgers the next day, 4–3.

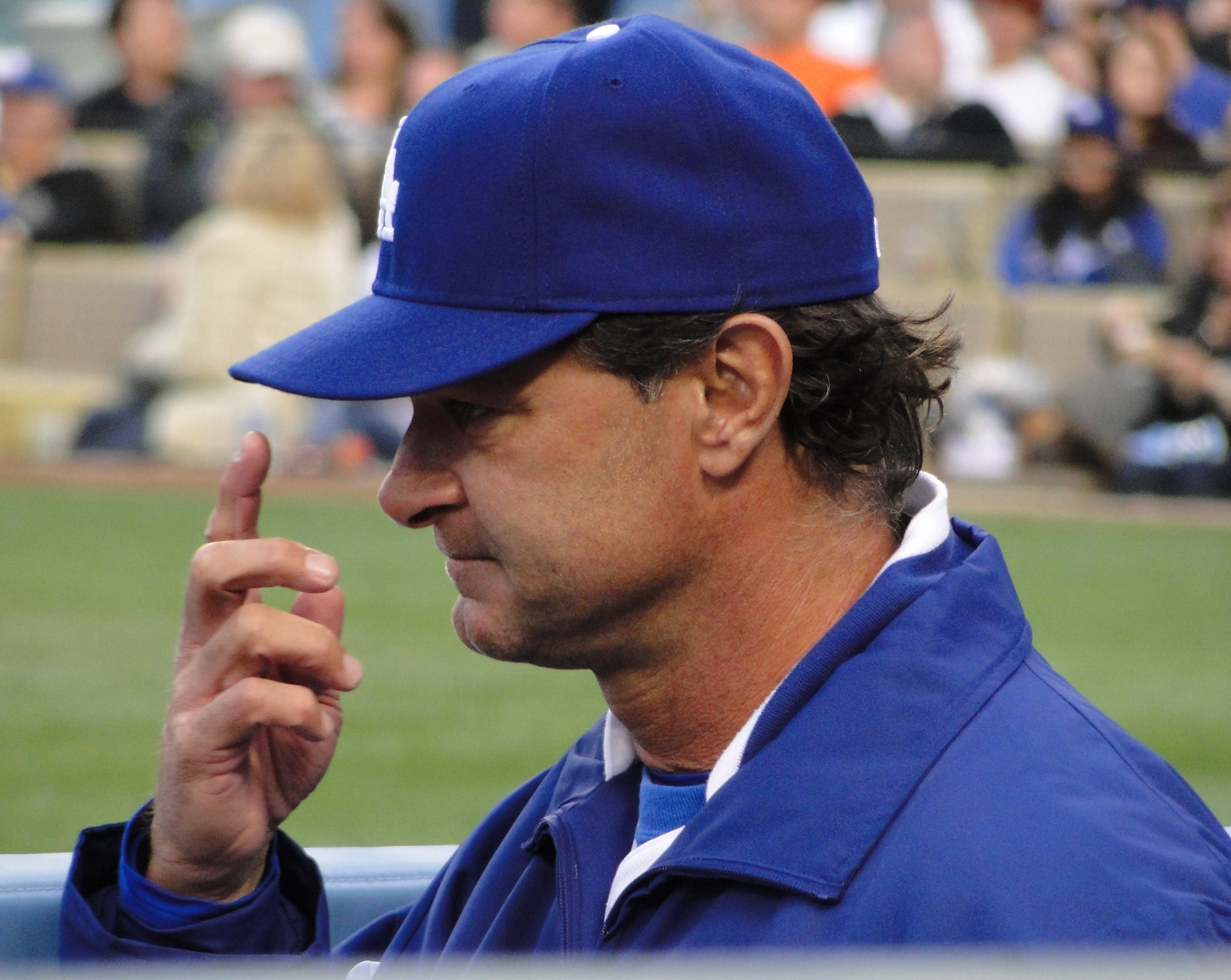
An eight-game losing streak to start the month of May had fans calling for Manager Don Mattingly to be fired.

The team returned home to open a series against the Arizona Diamondbacks. Chris Capuano came off the disabled list to allow six runs in 4+ innings, Carl Crawford misplayed two balls in the outfield and the losing streak hit 5 in a 9–2 loss. Paul Goldschmidt hit a two-run homer off Brandon League in the ninth on May 7 to send the Dodgers to their sixth straight loss 5–3. This was the second six-game losing streak of the season for the team, the first time that had happened since 1912. Goldschmidt hit two more runs the next day as the Diamondbacks won 3–2. This was the first time the Dodgers had been swept in consecutive series since 2008. The Dodgers combined for 10 hits on May 10 against the Miami Marlins, including a three-run homer by Adrián González in the first inning. But it wasn't enough as they lost 5–4 to run the losing streak to 8. Hyun-jin Ryu pitched well the next day, allowing only 1 run in 6.2 innings, as the Dodgers snapped their 8-game losing streak with a 7–1 win over the Marlins. Andre Ethier had 4 hits in 4 at-bats and Dee Gordon hit his 2nd career home run in the win. Chris Capuano picked up his first win of the season on Mother's Day as Scott Van Slyke went 2 for 4 with a home run in the Dodgers 5–3 win. Matt Kemp picked up his 1,000th career hit in the game, the fifth fastest Dodger to reach that mark. Beckett struggled the next night, allowing 4 runs in only 3 innings of a 6–2 loss to the Washington Nationals. Kershaw was back on the mound on May 14, striking out 11 in 8 2/3 scoreless innings. Andre Ethier provided a two-run single for the 2–0 win. Zack Greinke returned from the disabled list to allow only one run in 5 1/3 innings to get a 3–1 win over the Nationals in the final game of the homestand.

The Dodgers went back on the road on May 17 against the Atlanta Braves at Turner Field. Van Slyke hit two home runs in the first game but Paco Rodriguez allowed a grand slam home run to Justin Upton and the Braves won 8–5. Chris Capuano pitched well the next day, taking a shutout into the 8th inning but reliever Kenley Jansen allowed back-to-back homers to Evan Gattis and Andrelton Simmons and the team lost again, 3–1. The bullpen surrendered the lead again the next night as the Braves completed the sweep with a 5–2 win. The Dodgers traveled to Miller Park for a series against the Milwaukee Brewers next. After 3 straight days of bullpen meltdowns, Clayton Kershaw picked the team up by pitching his 10th career complete game and only allowing 3 hits in a 3–1 victory. Ethier and Kemp homered in the win. The team reverted to form the next day as they stranded 14 runners in scoring position and Zack Greinke struggled in a 5–2 defeat. The offense finally came alive as the Dodgers wrapped up the road trip with a 9–2 win over the Brewers on May 22.

The Dodgers returned home on May 24 for a series against the St. Louis Cardinals amid media speculation that Manager Don Mattingly was in danger of losing his job. The team didn't help his cause as they managed only 3 hits against Lance Lynn and lost 7–0. Adrián González had a homer, double and three RBI in a 5–3 victory over the Cardinals the following day. Gonzalez homered and drove in 3 more the next day, but Kershaw had a rough outing allowing four runs, his most all season, in a 5–3 loss. Continuing his hot streak, Gonzalez was 4 for 4 on May 27 against the Los Angeles Angels of Anaheim as the Dodgers came back from a 6–1 deficit to win 8–7. Hyun-Jin Ryu pitched a complete-game shutout and Luis Cruz hit his first home run of the year in a 3–0 win over the Angels the following day in the final game of the homestand.

The Freeway series continued the next night at Angel Stadium, as Jered Weaver held the Dodgers offense in check and the Angels won 4–3. The Angels took the finale to the series, 3–2, thanks to solid pitching by Jason Vargas and an RBI infield single by Chris Nelson. The Dodgers concluded a tough month of May with a game at Coors Field against the Colorado Rockies. Kershaw pitched seven plus solid innings but Todd Helton two-run homer off closer Brandon League tied the game in the bottom of the ninth. The Dodgers rallied to score two in the tenth for their first extra inning win of the season, 7–5.

=== June ===
The Dodgers began June much the way they ended May. Ronald Belisario allowed a two-run homer to Michael Cuddyer in the seventh to blow the lead and then Dexter Fowler hit a walk-off single off Matt Guerrier in the 10th as the Rockies beat the Dodgers 7–6. Matt Magill was called up from the minors to make a spot start on June 2 but he struggled. Magill became the first Major Leaguer since at least 1916 to allow at least nine walks and four homers in the same start as the Dodgers were crushed 7–2.

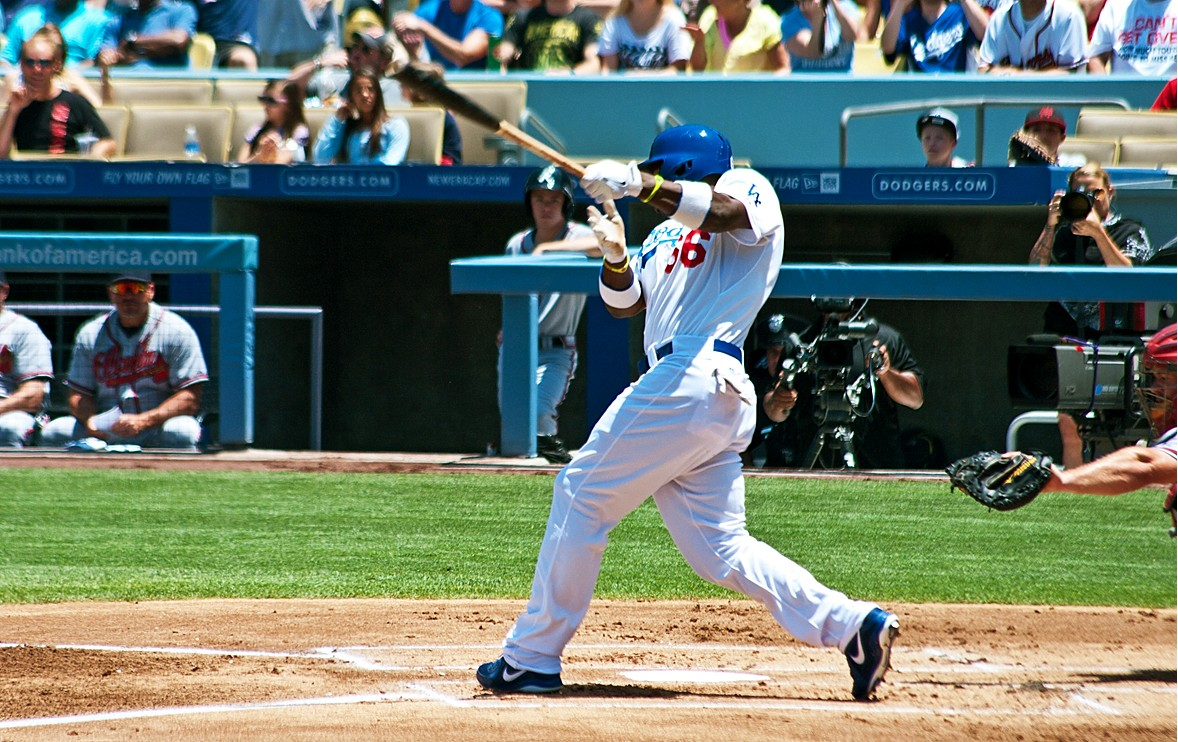
Yasiel Puig made his debut in June and hit .436 with 7 home runs. His 44 hits in the month was second most all-time for a rookie in his debut month.

The Dodgers returned home to play the San Diego Padres. Stephen Fife was the second straight spot starter, allowing one run in 5 1/3 innings. Adrián González and Scott Van Slyke each hit solo homers to account for all the Dodgers runs in the 2–1 win. The story of the game however, was the debut of top prospect Yasiel Puig, who went 2 for 4 and threw out a runner at first from the warning track on a double play to end the game. In the next game, Puig went 3 for 4 with a double and two home runs to lead the team to a 9–7 victory. He was the first Dodger player in history with a multi-homer game in one of his first two games and the first with five RBI in one of his first two games since Spider Jorgensen in 1947. However, he went 0 for 4 with 2 strikeouts in the series finale as Jason Marquis no hit the Dodgers into the sixth inning and the Padres won 6–2 to keep the Dodgers in last place in the division. Zack Greinke pitched seven scoreless innings on June 6 against the Atlanta Braves and Puig continued his hot start by blasting a grand slam home run in the eighth inning to blow open the Dodgers 5–0 win. Puig homered again the next day, and became only the second player in the modern era with four homers in his first five games and he tied the Major League record with 10 RBI in his first five games. Hyun-Jin Ryu allowed one run on six hits in 7 2/3 innings and the Dodgers won, 2–1, when pinch runner Skip Schumaker scored on a wild pitch by Anthony Varvaro in the bottom of the 10th. The Braves won the next day, 2–1, as Kris Medlen pitched 6 2/3 scoreless innings and hit a solo homer. That was one of two homers allowed by Stephen Fife in the fifth inning. Matt Magill made another emergency start on June 9 as Ted Lilly went back on the disabled list. He walked six and allowed seven runs in 3 2/3 innings as the Dodgers lost to the Braves 8–1. Clayton Kershaw allowed only one run in seven innings on June 10 against the Arizona Diamondbacks but Brandon League was tagged for four runs in the ninth and the Dodgers lost 5–4. Puig had three hits on the day to move his batting average to .500 on the season. He became the first Dodger in history with 16 hits in his first eight games and the first with six multi-hit games in his first eight. The Dodgers beat the Diamondbacks the next day as Tim Federowicz three-run double provided the difference in the 5–3 win. The game was marred by five hit batters, two bench clearing incidents, and six ejections of players and coaches. The Dodgers ended their homestand with an 8–6 loss to the Diamondbacks in 12 innings on June 12.

Major League Baseball on June 14 announced the discipline for the fight between the Dodgers and Diamondbacks that took place a few days prior. Diamondbacks pitcher Ian Kennedy was suspended 10 games and utility player Eric Hinske 5 games, while Dodgers utility player Skip Schumaker and relief pitcher J. P. Howell were suspended two games and Ronald Belisario one. In addition manager Don Mattingly and hitting coach Mark McGwire were suspended as well and several players were fined.

The Dodgers began a roadtrip at PNC Park on June 14 but the woes continued as Jeff Locke tossed seven shutout innings and the Pittsburgh Pirates won 3–0. The next day, Kershaw allowed only one run and three hits in seven innings, while striking out eight. However, the bullpen coughed up the lead yet again. This time the Dodgers managed to pull out the win 5–3 in 11 innings. A three-run home run by Pedro Álvarez off Greinke was the key to the Pirates' 6–3 win in the series finale. The Dodgers were scheduled to begin a two-game series against the New York Yankees on June 18, but a rain out forced the two teams to play a day-night doubleheader on June 19. Hanley Ramírez had four hits, including a two-run homer in the first game, but the Dodgers committed four errors in the game and lost 6–4. Chris Capuano came off the disabled list to pitch six shutout innings and Puig hit a home run to lead the Dodgers to a split of the doubleheader with a 6–0 win. Puig had 27 hits in his first 15 games, second most all-time. After the game, they took a cross-country plane ride and opened a series against the Padres in San Diego. They lost 6–3 as the Padres defenders made several highlight reel plays and Pedro Ciriaco had an RBI triple and a two-run home run in the game. The Dodgers committed two more errors the next day, tying the Houston Astros for the league lead. They lost 5–2. Zack Greinke had his best start as a Dodger on June 22, holding the Padres to one run and four hits, while striking out eight in eight innings. Adrián González and Hanley Ramírez homered in the 6–1 victory. González and Ramírez hit back-to-back homers the following day to help the Dodgers split the series 3–1.

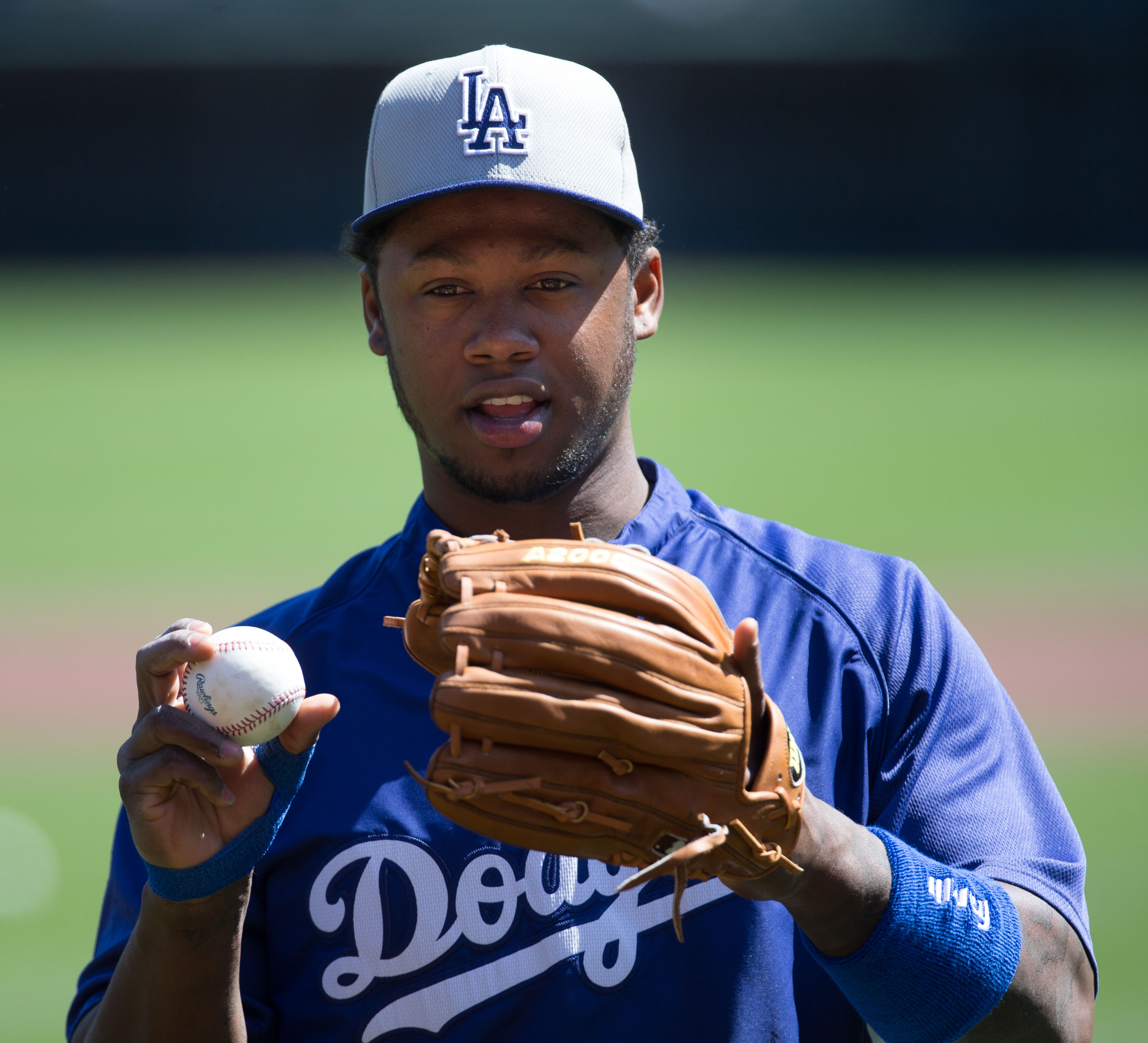
Hanley Ramírez came off the disabled list in June and had a 12-game hitting streak, during which he hit .477.

The Dodgers returned home on June 24, to open a series against the San Francisco Giants. Yasiel Puig went 3 for 4 with a home run and two RBI in the first game as the Dodgers won 3–1, their first three-game winning streak since they swept the Pirates on April 5–7. They extended the streak to four games when they beat the Giants 6–5 the next day. Ramírez and Mark Ellis homered and Matt Kemp came off the disabled list to make a game-saving catch to end the game and preserve the win. The Dodgers finished off the three-game sweep of the Giants with a 4–2 win on June 26. Kershaw pitched 8+ innings and allowed only a two-run homer to Buster Posey, while striking out seven. Puig delivered the go-ahead two-out, two-run single in the seventh inning as the Dodgers took the opener of a series from the Philadelphia Phillies to stretch the winning streak to six games. The streak came to an abrupt end on June 28 as the Phillies erupted for 21 hits and 16 runs in a 16–1 shellacking of the Dodgers. It was the team's worst home loss since 1947 and the most runs allowed in a game since 2003. Hanley Ramírez was 3 for 4 with a 3-run homer the following day, and also scored the winning run on a walk-off single by A. J. Ellis as the Dodgers won 4–3. The Dodgers finished out their first winning month of the season with a 6–1 victory over the Phillies. Stephen Fife pitched seven shutout innings but the real story was Yasiel Puig who was 4 for 5 with a double and a triple to break Steve Sax's team record for most hits in a month by a rookie with 44. His total was also second most all-time among rookies in their first month, behind only Joe DiMaggio.

=== July ===
In their first July game, the Dodgers moved out of last place for the first time since May 5. Clayton Kershaw struck out eight and pitched a complete-game shutout in the 8–0 victory over the Rockies at Coors Field. The Dodgers won again the next night as Juan Uribe, Adrián González, Hanley Ramírez and Matt Kemp all homered in the 10–8 win. González was 4 for 5 with a homer in the series finale and Kemp also hit another homer, but Chris Capuano allowed 5 runs in 4 1/3 innings and the Rockies won the game, 9–5. The Dodgers began a series with the Giants at AT&T Park on July 5. Uribe had a double, triple, homer and 7 RBI in the 10–2 win. Three errors and an inability to mount any offense against Giants starter Madison Bumgarner led to the 4–2 loss the following day. A. J. Ellis three-run double in the top of the ninth of Sergio Romo gave the Dodgers a 4–1 win on July 7. Zack Greinke allowed only two hits and struck out seven in seven scoreless innings to lead the Dodgers to a 6–1 victory over the first place Arizona Diamondbacks at Chase Field. Ricky Nolasco made his first start as a Dodger on July 9, after having been acquired in a trade with the Miami Marlins a few days prior. He allowed only one run on four hits in seven innings of work and the Dodgers again won 6–1. Also on July 9, Skip Schumaker switched uniform numbers from 3 to his more comfortable number 55 that he had worn for his first 8 seasons with the St. Louis Cardinals from 2005 to 2012. Hanley Ramírez and A. J. Ellis hit back-to-back homers in the top of the 14th inning as the Dodgers swept the Diamondbacks with a 7–5 win to climb back to .500 for the first time since April 30.

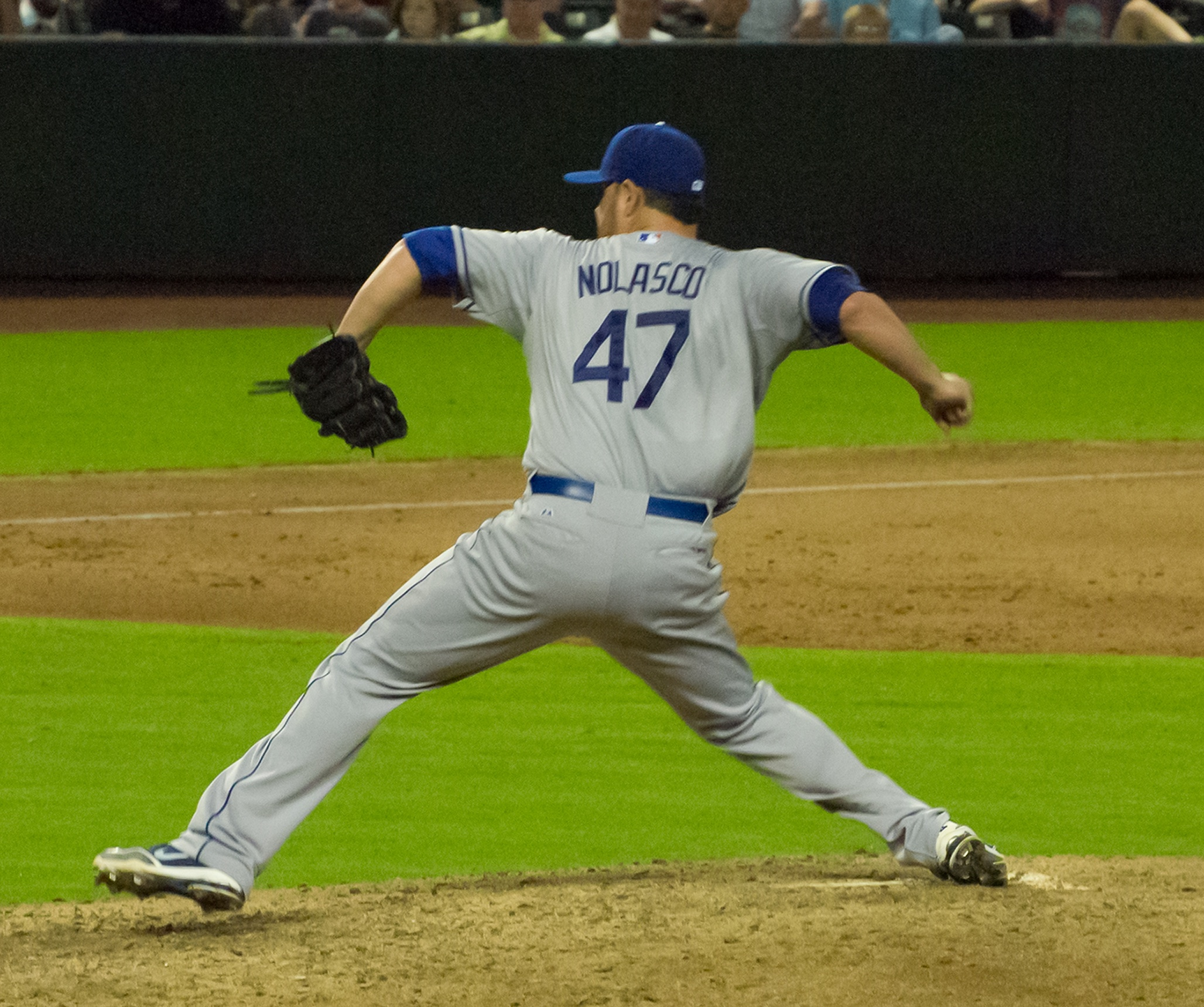
Ricky Nolasco was acquired in a trade with the Miami Marlins on July 6

The Dodgers returned home on July 11 and extended their winning streak with a 6–1 victory over the Rockies. Capuano pitched 6.1 scoreless innings, while striking out a season-high eight and Mark Ellis was 3 for 4 with 4 RBI in the game. The Dodgers' five-game winning streak came to an end when Juan Nicasio shut them out 3–0. The Dodgers returned the favor the next day as Zack Greinke struck out nine and allowed only two hits in a 1–0 complete-game shutout. The Dodgers headed into the All-Star break with a 47–47 record after losing 3–1 to split the series with the Rockies. Kershaw was the Dodgers only representative at the 2013 Major League Baseball All-Star Game, and retired the three batters he faced in his one inning of work.

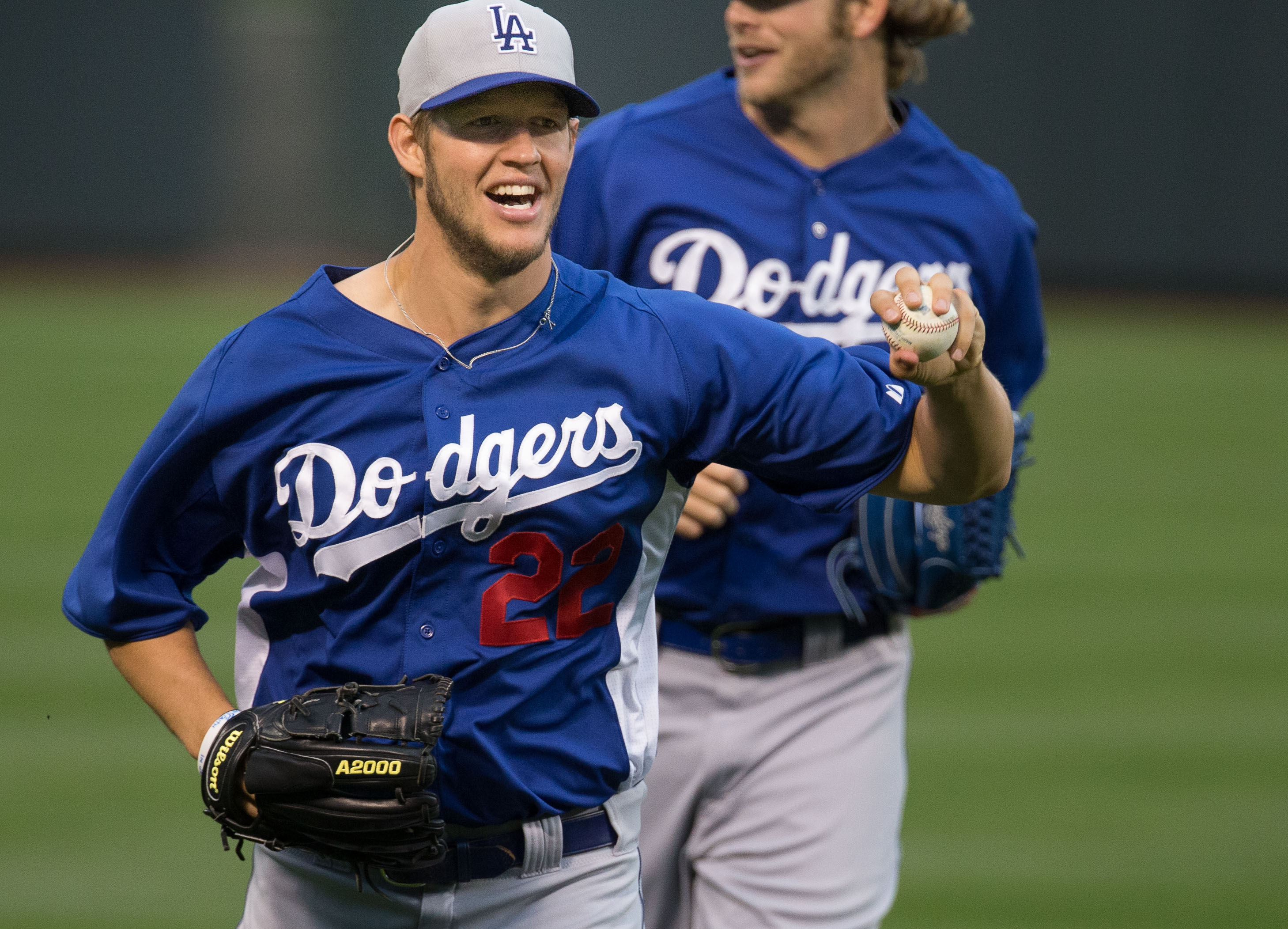
Clayton Kershaw was 4–1 with a 1.34 ERA in 6 starts in the month of July and was selected as National League Pitcher of the Month

After the break, the Dodgers traveled to the nation's capital for a three-game series against the Washington Nationals. Hanley Ramírez hit a two-run homer and Andre Ethier a solo shot to account for all the team's runs in a 3–2 win. Ramírez's RBI double in the 10th inning capped a 3 for 5 night as the Dodgers took game 2 of the series, 3–1, on July 20. Matt Kemp rejoined the Dodgers on July 21 after spending two weeks on the disabled list with a sore shoulder. In his return, he was 3 for 4 with a homer as the Dodgers drubbed the Nationals 9–2 to sweep the series. The Dodgers moved into first place for the first time all season when they clobbered the Toronto Blue Jays 14–5 on July 22. A. J. Ellis set career highs with five RBI, four hits (including a homer), and three runs. Skip Schumaker also hit a three-run homer in the game. The following day, the Dodgers fell behind 8–3 after 6 innings but came back and won 10–9. Adrián González three-run homer in the eighth inning was the big blow. They came from behind again the next day, closing out the road trip by scoring 5 runs in the top of the 10th with home runs by Mark Ellis and Yasiel Puig to win 8–3. With the win the Dodgers set an L.A. Dodger record with their 10th straight road win, something the Dodgers franchise hadn't done since 1955. This was also the first time they had swept an interleague series (of three or more games) since 2003 and the first time they had scored eight or more runs in four straight games since 1985.

The Dodgers returned home on July 25 and dropped the opener of a four-game series against the Cincinnati Reds, 5–2. Mat Latos held the Dodgers to one run in 7 2/3 innings, and Jay Bruce and Xavier Paul each homered to end the six-game winning streak. Hanley Ramírez hit a two-run homer to back Clayton Kershaw's eight strikeouts in eight innings as the club won 2–1 in the second game of the series. Hyun-jin Ryu dominated on July 27, striking out nine and allowing only one run on two hits in seven innings in the Dodgers' 4–1 victory over the Reds. Puig hit a walk-off homer in the bottom of the 11th as the Dodgers took the series finale 1–0. A pitching duel between Chris Capuano and Tony Cingrani kept the game tied heading into extra innings. The 20 strikeouts by Dodgers batters in the game set a franchise record, breaking the mark set during a 15-inning game on May 2, 1995 against the Giants. Greinke stuck out 7 in 7 innings and Mark Ellis hit a walk-off RBI single in the ninth as the Dodgers beat the New York Yankees 3–2 on July 30. Kershaw pitched eight shutout innings as the month came to a close, but Hiroki Kuroda also did not allow a run and the Yankees won 3–0 after scoring all their runs off the Dodgers bullpen in the top of the ninth.

=== August ===
The Dodgers traveled to Wrigley Field and started the month of August with a 6–4 victory over the Chicago Cubs, extending the road winning streak to 11. The following day they won again 6–2, tying the all-time franchise record of 12 set by the 1924 Brooklyn Robins. Hyun-jin Ryu became the first Dodger rookie to win 10 games in a season since Kazuhisa Ishii in 2002. A two-run single by Carl Crawford keyed the Dodgers' 3–0 win over the Cubs on August 3 to extend the streak to 13, a new franchise record and the longest in the National League since the 1976 Phillies also won 13. The team finished off a sweep of the Cubs with a 1–0 victory. Stephen Fife came off the DL to pitch 5 1/3 scoreless innings and Kenley Jansen pitched a scoreless ninth for his 17th save, and 25th consecutive batter he had retired in a row. This was the Dodgers' first four-game sweep at Wrigley Field since 1954. Zack Greinke picked up his 100th career win in the Dodgers' 3–2 victory over the St. Louis Cardinals at Busch Stadium. He pitched 6 1/3 innings and drove in the eventual winning run with a single in the seventh. A lack of clutch hitting led to the Dodgers first road loss in a month, a 5–1 loss to the Cardinals on August 7. The streak ended at 15, just two behind the all-time record set by the 1984 Tigers and 1916 Giants. Cardinals starter Shelby Miller had to leave the next game after only two pitches due to injury and the Dodgers erupted for 6 runs in the second inning on their way to a 13–4 win. Crawford had 4 hits from the leadoff spot and both Andre Ethier and Skip Schumaker had 3 hits and 4 RBI in the win. Ryu struck out seven in seven innings while not walking a batter and allowing only one unearned run as the Dodgers completed a 7–1 road trip with a 5–1 win. A. J. Ellis delivered the big blow with a 3-run homer.

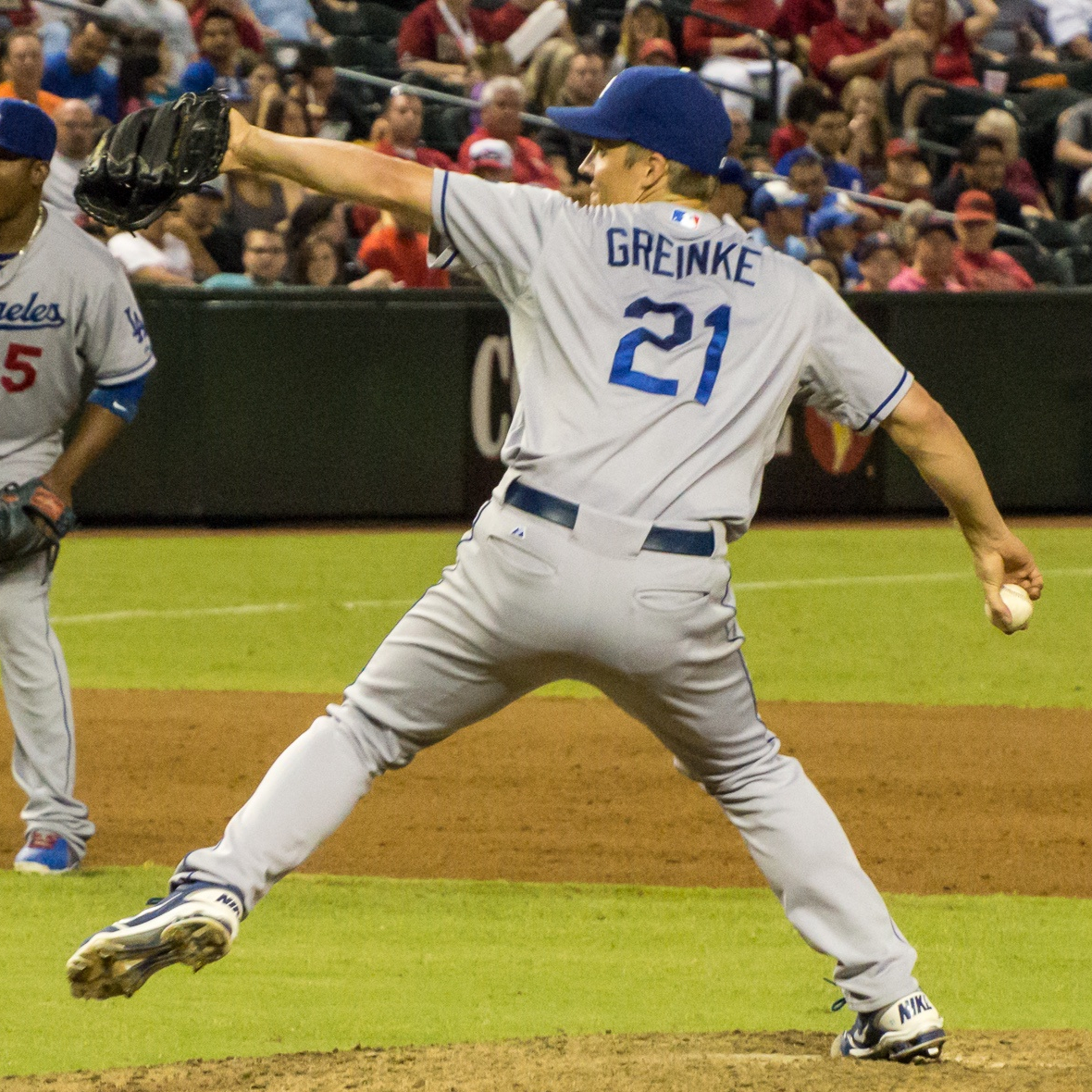
Zack Greinke was 5–0 with a 1.23 ERA in August and won the National League Pitcher of the Month Award.

The Dodgers returned home on August 9 to begin an interleague series against the Tampa Bay Rays. In the opener, the Rays jumped out to a 6–0 lead and David Price allowed only one unearned run through his seven innings. However, the Dodgers rallied against the Rays bullpen with two runs in the eighth and four in the ninth to win 7–6. Zack Greinke pitched 6 1/3 scoreless innings, Adrián González homered, Skip Schumaker had four hits and the Dodgers won the second game of the series, 5–0. Clayton Kershaw dominated in the series finale, striking out eight and allowing just 3 hits and 1 earned run in 8 strong innings, while driving in 2 runs on a second-inning single. The Dodgers won 8–2. The next day, they beat the New York Mets 4–2 as Nick Punto homered and González had three hits and an RBI. The Dodgers record of 38–8 over their past 46 games was the franchise's best mark since the 1899 Brooklyn Superbas. Ryu pitched another good game the following day, beating Mets ace Matt Harvey to pick up his 12th win in the Dodgers 4–2 victory. On August 14, the Dodgers fell behind early 4–0 after 3 innings but again fought their way back and tied it up on a two-run pinch hit homer by Andre Ethier in the bottom of the ninth. Back-to-back doubles by Yasiel Puig and González in the 12th gave them a 5–4 walk-off win. This was the 12th straight victory for the Dodgers in one-run games, a franchise record, and their 40th win in 48 games, the best mark in the Majors since the 1942 St. Louis Cardinals.

The Dodgers traveled to the east coast to begin a road trip with the Philadelphia Phillies at Citizens Bank Park. Greinke and the bullpen shut out the Phillies and Hanley Ramírez hit a two-run homer in the 4–0 win. Kershaw struck out 8 in 8 scoreless innings as the Dodgers shut out the Phillies again, 5–0 for their first 10-game win streak since 2006. The record of 42–8 over the past 50 games was the third best 50 game stretch in Major League history, behind only the 1906 Cubs and 1912 Giants. The streak was snapped the next day as Ramírez made two errors in the bottom of the ninth and the Phillies won 3–2. The Dodgers lost consecutive games for the first time since June 20–21 when they dropped the opener of a series against the Miami Marlins 6–2 on August 19 at Marlins Park. Yasiel Puig came off the bench and hit a solo homer to lead off the eighth inning as the Dodgers won the second game of the series, 6–4. Greinke pitched another good game the next day, allowing only one run in eight innings as the Dodgers capitalized on 3 Marlins errors to win 4–1. Kershaw followed that up by again pitching eight scoreless innings in the Dodgers 6–0 shutout of the Marlins to end the road trip.

The Dodgers began a three-game series against the American League East leading Boston Red Sox at Dodger Stadium on August 24. Ricky Nolasco and John Lackey both pitched eight strong innings, and only five hits were allowed combined. Hanley Ramírez two-run homer in the 4th was the only scoring in the 2–0 win for the Dodgers, which stretched their lead in the division to 10 1/2 games, the largest since 1977. Ryu allowed 4 runs in the first inning the next day, with the big blow on a 3-run homer by Jonny Gomes and the Dodgers never recovered, losing 4–2. The Red Sox won the series finale 8–1, the Dodgers first series loss since June 14–16. They had won or tied 18 straight series, a franchise record. Greinke got the Dodgers back on track after their two-game slide, pitching 8 2/3 innings against the Cubs and also hitting an RBI single in the 6–0 win. The Dodgers offense was stymied by Cubs pitcher Travis Wood the next night and they lost 3–2. The team moved past 3 million in attendance this night, the first team in the Majors to reach that mark. Nolasco pitched eight shutout innings, while striking out 11, and Ramírez and Ethier both homered in the 4–0 win on August 28. The Dodgers 8 shutout wins in the month of August was the most by any MLB team in one month since the Dodgers did it in September of 1988. Yasiel Puig had four hits and Adrián González hit two homers as the Dodgers pounded the San Diego Padres 9–2 on August 30, setting a new L.A. Dodgers record with 22 wins in a month, one shy of the franchise record set by the 1953 and 1957 Brooklyn Dodgers. Newly signed Edinson Vólquez made his Dodgers debut, the 26th pitcher the team used this season, setting a franchise record. The Dodgers tied the franchise record for wins in a month the next day, as they finished August with a 2–1 win over the Padres.

=== September ===
The Dodgers started September with a 2–1 win to finish off a sweep of the San Diego Padres. Zack Greinke allowed one run on two hits and Yasiel Puig homered in the win.

Clayton Kershaw had a rare poor performance in the opener of a road series against the Colorado Rockies. He allowed 5 runs and a career-high 11 hits, but the Dodger offense picked him up and the team continued winning, 10–8. Ricky Nolasco won his sixth straight decision, 7–4, on September 3 as Nick Punto had four hits and Carl Crawford had three hits and two RBI. The Dodgers dropped the series finale to the Rockies, 7–5, thanks to a poor first Dodger start by Edison Volquez, who allowed four runs in four innings of work. The Dodgers next traveled to Great American Ball Park to begin a weekend series with the Cincinnati Reds. Chris Capuano left the game in the second inning with a groin strain and the Reds won 3–2. A walk-off single by Todd Frazier in the 10th inning gave the Reds a 4–3 victory on September 7, sending the Dodgers to their first three-game losing streak since June 8–10. The Reds completed the sweep, 3–2, thanks to two home runs by Jay Bruce and a walk-off double by Ryan Hanigan.

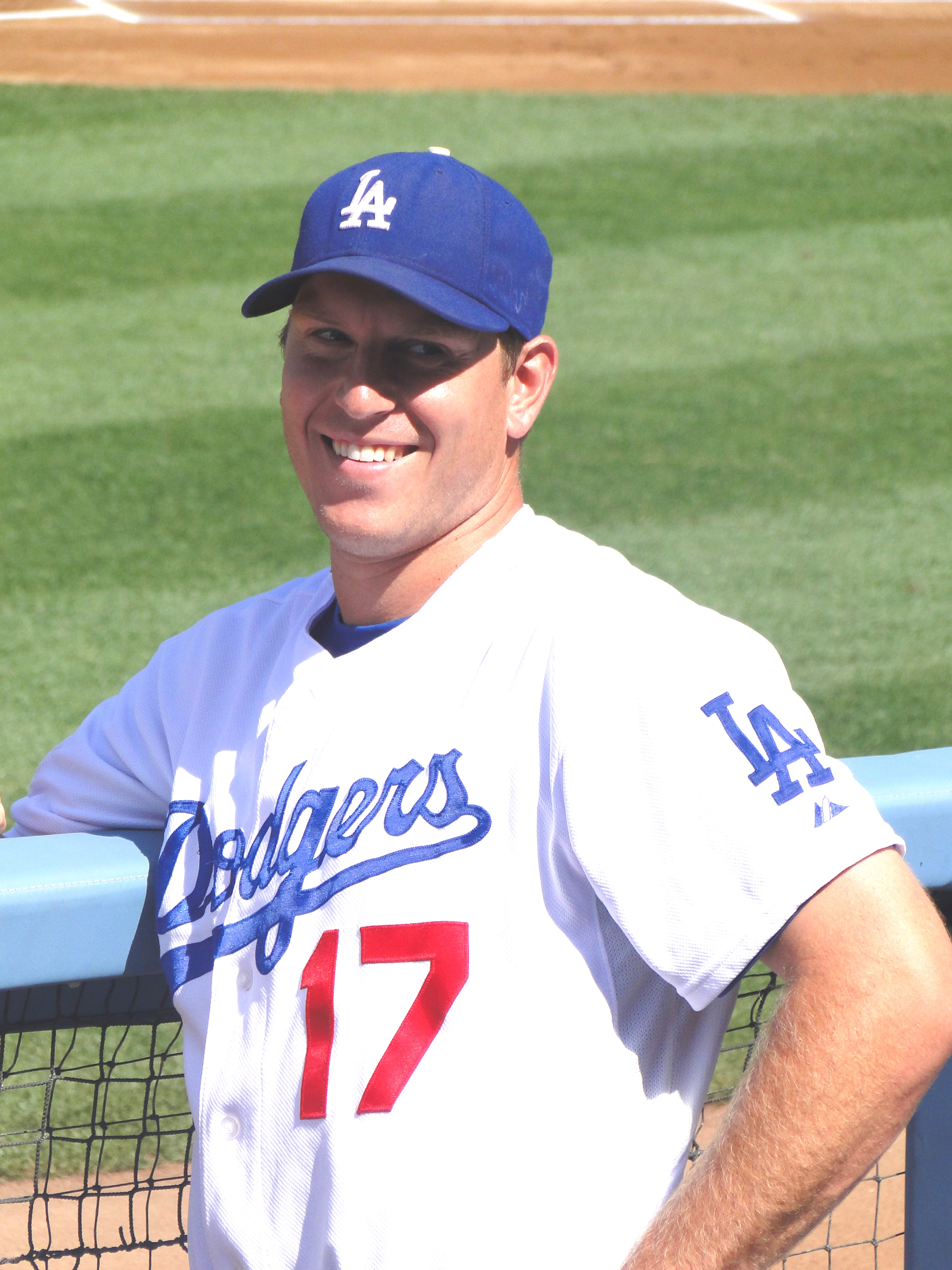
A.J. Ellis's solo homer on September 19 against the Diamondbacks helped the Dodgers clinch the NL West championship.

The Dodgers returned home on September 9 and smacked the Arizona Diamondbacks 8–1. Juan Uribe made 4 hits, including 3 home runs, in 4 at-bats. He was the first Dodger to hit three homers in a game since Andre Ethier on June 26, 2009. The Dodgers as a team hit six homers in the game, the most since they hit seven against the Padres on September 16, 2006. The team won again the next night, as Scott Van Slyke hit a pinch hit walk-off home run in the 11th inning to give the Dodgers a 5–3 win. This was the team's first walk-off homer by a pinch hitter since Olmedo Sáenz in 2007. Patrick Corbin kept the Dodgers offense in check the next day and the Diamondbacks won 4–1. A walk-off single by Adrián González in the 10th inning gave the Dodgers a 3–2 win over the San Francisco Giants on September 12. Madison Bumgarner out pitched Kershaw as the Giants won the next game, 4–2. The Giants pounded the Dodgers 19–3 on September 15. The 19 runs was the most ever scored by one team at Dodger Stadium, the most allowed by the Dodgers in a game since May 5, 2001, at Chicago, and the worst Dodger home defeat since a July 3, 1947, loss to the Giants in Brooklyn. Hunter Pence hit two homers in the Giants 4–3 win in the series finale. He hit five home runs in total in the four game series, the first Giant to accomplish that feat against the Dodgers since Willie Mays.

The Dodgers traveled to Phoenix to begin a four-game series against the Diamondbacks, needing to win just two of them to clinch the Western Division title. In the opener, Hyun-Jin Ryu allowed only two hits in a complete game effort; however, one of those hits was a two-run homer by Paul Goldschmidt and they lost again 2–1. Matt Kemp and Hanley Ramírez returned to the Dodgers' lineup on September 17 after missing time with injuries and both reached base four times as Uribe and González homered. The Dodgers snapped the four-game losing streak with a 9–3 win. They failed in their first chance to clinch the division when spot starter Stephen Fife didn't make it out of the third the next night and Ronald Belisario was pounded for five runs in relief. The Diamondbacks won 9–4. The Dodgers clinched the National League West championship with a 7–6 win over the Diamondbacks on September 19. Ramírez hit two home runs and A. J. Ellis hit the game-winning homer in the eighth inning for the Dodgers' first West title since 2009. The team's 9 1/2-game deficit on June 21 was the largest the Dodgers had ever overcome to win a division, and they were just the fourth team in MLB history to ever accomplish that feat. The next day, the Dodgers rested all the regulars in the opening of a series at the San Diego Padres. The backups could not generate any offense and the Padres won 2–0. Clayton Kershaw was brilliant the next day, pitching seven shutout innings while allowing just three hits and striking out ten. Yasiel Puig and A. J. Ellis both hit two-run homers in the 4–0 victory. Zack Greinke pitched five shutout innings as the Dodgers wrapped up their series with the Padres with a 1–0 win. Hyun-jin Ryu allowed only one run in seven innings and Puig and Matt Kemp each hit solo homers as the Dodgers won the opener of their final road series of the season, 2–0, over the Giants. Ricky Nolasco allowed six runs over 5 2/3 innings in his last start of the regular season, a 6–4 loss to the Giants. It was his third straight poor start. The Dodgers finished up their final road series of the regular season when Ángel Pagán homered off Paco Rodriguez to give the Giants a 3–2 victory.

Kershaw pitched six shutout innings in his final start of the regular season, an 11–0 win, on September 27. He finished the season with a Major League leading 1.83 ERA, making him the first pitcher to lead the league three years in a row since Greg Maddux in 1993–95. His ERA was the lowest for a starter since Pedro Martínez in 2000. Greinke also pitched well in his final start, allowing only one run while striking out seven in six innings. However, the Dodgers were unable to score and lost the game, 1–0. The Dodgers lost their final game of the regular season, 2–1, to the Rockies on September 29. They finished the season with a record of 92–70.

=== Game log ===
Legend
	Dodgers win
	Dodgers loss
	Postponement
**Bold**	Dodgers team member

2013 Game Log
April (13–13)

#	Date	Opponent	Score	Win	Loss	Save	Attendance	Record
1	April 1	Giants	**W** 4–0	**Kershaw** (1–0)	Kontos (0–1)		53,138	1–0
2	April 2	Giants	L 0–3	Bumgarner (1–0)	**Ryu** (0–1)	Romo (1)	45,431	1–1
3	April 3	Giants	L 3–5	Lincecum (1–0)	**Beckett** (0–1)	Romo (2)	52,906	1–2
4	April 5	Pirates	**W** 3–0	**Greinke** (1–0)	Sánchez (0–1)	**League** (1)	40,607	2–2
5	April 6	Pirates	**W** 1–0	**Kershaw** (2–0)	Burnett (0–2)	**League** (2)	39,446	3–2
6	April 7	Pirates	**W** 6–2	**Ryu** (1–1)	Locke (0–1)		52,053	4–2
7	April 9	@ Padres	L 3–9	Gregerson (1–0)	**Belisario** (0–1)		44,436	4–3
8	April 10	@ Padres	**W** 4–3	**Billingsley** (1–0)	Stults (1–1)	**League** (3)	22,843	5–3
9	April 11	@ Padres	**W** 3–2	**Guerrier** (1–0)	Gregerson (1–1)	**Jansen** (1)	24,610	6–3
10	April 12	@ Diamondbacks	L 0–3	Corbin (2–0)	**Kershaw** (2–1)	Putz (2)	29,520	6–4
11	April 13	@ Diamondbacks	**W** 7–5	**Ryu** (2–1)	Kennedy (1–1)	**League** (4)	37,214	7–4
12	April 14	@ Diamondbacks	L 0–1	Putz (1–0)	**Beckett** (0–2)		32,313	7–5
13	April 15	Padres	L 3–6	Stults (2–1)	**Belisario** (0–2)	Street (2)	52,136	7–6
14	April 16	Padres	L 2–9	Marquis (1–1)	**Capuano** (0–1)		35,898	7–7
15	April 17	Padres	L 2–7	Brach (1–0)	**Kershaw** (2–2)		52,393	7–8
--	April 19	@ Orioles	**Postponed (rain)** (Makeup date: April 20)					
16	April 20	@ Orioles	L 5–7	O'Day (2–0)	**Rodriguez** (0–1)	Johnson (7)	26,811	7–9
17	April 20	@ Orioles	L 1–6	Chen (1–2)	**Beckett** (0–3)	Hunter (1)	42,348	7–10
18	April 21	@ Orioles	**W** 7–4	**Howell** (1–0)	Arrieta (1–1)	**League** (5)	41,265	8–10
19	April 23	@ Mets	**W** 7–2	**Belisario** (1–2)	Lyon (1–1)		21,135	9–10
20	April 24	@ Mets	L 3–7 (10)	Parnell (1–0)	**Wall** (0–1)		24,130	9–11
21	April 25	@ Mets	**W** 3–2	**Jansen** (1–0)	Rice (1–1)	**League** (6)	24,851	10–11
22	April 26	Brewers	**W** 7–5	**Belisario** (2–2)	Gonzalez (0–2)	**League** (7)	44,930	11–11
23	April 27	Brewers	L 4–6	Peralta (2–1)	**Guerrier** (1–1)	Henderson (6)	50,224	11–12
24	April 28	Brewers	**W** 2–0	**Kershaw** (3–2)	Lohse (1–2)	**League** (8)	49,003	12–12
25	April 29	Rockies	L 2–12	Chatwood (1–0)	**Lilly** (0–1)		31,570	12–13
26	April 30	Rockies	**W** 6–2	**Ryu** (3–1)	de la Rosa (2–3)		47,602	13–13

May (10–17)

#	Date	Opponent	Score	Win	Loss	Save	Attendance	Record
27	May 1	Rockies	L 3–7	Outman (1–0)	**Beckett** (0–4)		32,848	13–14
28	May 3	@ Giants	L 1–2	Romo (2–2)	**Belisario** (2–3)		42,113	13–15
29	May 4	@ Giants	L 9–10 (10)	Casilla (3–2)	**League** (0–1)		41,171	13–16
30	May 5	@ Giants	L 3–4	Cain (1–2)	**Ryu** (3–2)	Romo (12)	41,140	13–17
31	May 6	Diamondbacks	L 2–9	Cahill (2–3)	**Capuano** (0–2)		30,981	13–18
32	May 7	Diamondbacks	L 3–5	Hernandez (2–2)	**League** (0–2)	Bell (2)	33,611	13–19
33	May 8	Diamondbacks	L 2–3	Miley (3–1)	**Jansen** (1–1)	Bell (3)	31,512	13–20
34	May 10	Marlins	L 4–5	Fernández (2–2)	**Belisario** (2–4)	Cishek (5)	41,721	13–21
35	May 11	Marlins	**W** 7–1	**Ryu** (4–2)	Slowey (1–3)		42,208	14–21
36	May 12	Marlins	**W** 5–3	**Capuano** (1–2)	Koehler (0–1)		43,959	15–21
37	May 13	Nationals	L 2–6	Zimmermann (7–1)	**Beckett** (0–5)		32,337	15–22
38	May 14	Nationals	**W** 2–0	**Kershaw** (4–2)	Haren (4–4)	**Jansen** (2)	51,729	16–22
39	May 15	Nationals	**W** 3–1	**Greinke** (2–0)	Detwiler (2–4)	**League** (9)	36,721	17–22
40	May 17	@ Braves	L 5–8	Maholm (5–4)	**Rodriguez** (0–2)	Kimbrel (12)	43,238	17–23
41	May 18	@ Braves	L 1–3	Gearrin (1–0)	**Jansen** (1–2)	Kimbrel (13)	38,615	17–24
42	May 19	@ Braves	L 2–5	Avilán (2–0)	**Jansen** (1–3)	Kimbrel (14)	43,118	17–25
43	May 20	@ Brewers	**W** 3–1	**Kershaw** (5–2)	Gallardo (3–4)		28,287	18–25
44	May 21	@ Brewers	L 2–5	Fiers (1–2)	**Greinke** (2–1)	Henderson (9)	26,384	18–26
45	May 22	@ Brewers	**W** 9–2	**Ryu** (5–2)	Peralta (3–5)		36,963	19–26
46	May 24	Cardinals	L 0–7	Lynn (7–1)	**Capuano** (1–3)		45,134	19–27
47	May 25	Cardinals	**W** 5–3	**Rodriguez** (1–2)	Maness (3–1)	**League** (10)	49,368	20–27
48	May 26	Cardinals	L 3–5	Maness (4–1)	**Kershaw** (5–3)	Mujica (14)	43,244	20–28
49	May 27	Angels	**W** 8–7	**Belisario** (3–4)	Coello (1–1)	**League** (11)	49,953	21–28
50	May 28	Angels	**W** 3–0	**Ryu** (6–2)	Blanton (1–8)		46,443	22–28
51	May 29	@ Angels	L 3–4	Weaver (1–1)	**Capuano** (1–4)	Frieri (11)	39,172	22–29
52	May 30	@ Angels	L 2–3	Vargas (5–3)	**Lilly** (0–2)	Frieri (12)	42,231	22–30
53	May 31	@ Rockies	W 7–5 (10)	**League** (1–2)	Betancourt (1–3)	**Belisario** (1)	37,923	23–30

June (15–12)

#	Date	Opponent	Score	Win	Loss	Save	Attendance	Record
54	June 1	@ Rockies	L 6–7 (10)	Belisle (3–2)	**Guerrier** (1–2)		36,703	23–31
55	June 2	@ Rockies	L 2–7	de la Rosa (7–3)	**Magill** (0–1)		41,536	23–32
56	June 3	Padres	**W** 2–1	**Fife** (1–0)	Stults (4–5)	**League** (12)	37,055	24–32
57	June 4	Padres	**W** 9–7	**Howell** (2–0)	Ross (0–2)	**League** (13)	37,544	25–32
58	June 5	Padres	L 2–6	Marquis (7–2)	**Kershaw** (5–4)		40,040	25–33
59	June 6	Braves	**W** 5–0	**Greinke** (3–1)	Hudson (4–5)		44,196	26–33
60	June 7	Braves	**W** 2–1 (10)	**League** (2–2)	Varvaro (3–1)		47,164	27–33
61	June 8	Braves	L 1–2	Medlen (3–6)	**Fife** (1–1)	Kimbrel (18)	52,716	27–34
62	June 9	Braves	L 1–8	Minor (8–2)	**Magill** (0–2)		39,028	27–35
63	June 10	Diamondbacks	L 4–5	Sipp (3–1)	**League** (2–3)	Bell (12)	38,275	27–36
64	June 11	Diamondbacks	**W** 5–3	**Guerrier** (2–2)	Hernandez (2–3)	**Jansen** (3)	42,844	28–36
65	June 12	Diamondbacks	L 6–8 (12)	Collmenter (3–0)	**Belisario** (3–5)		41,927	28–37
66	June 14	@ Pirates	L 0–3	Locke (6–1)	**Fife** (1–2)	Grilli (24)	36,878	28–38
67	June 15	@ Pirates	**W** 5–3 (11)	**Moylan** (1–0)	Mazzaro (3–1)	**League** (14)	36,941	29–38
68	June 16	@ Pirates	L 3–6	Cole (2–0)	**Greinke** (3–2)	Grilli (25)	37,263	29–39
--	June 18	@ Yankees	**Postponed (rain)** (Makeup date: June 19)					
69	June 19	@ Yankees	L 4–6	Kuroda (7–5)	**Ryu** (6–3)	Rivera (25)	40,604	29–40
70	June 19	@ Yankees	**W** 6–0	**Capuano** (2–4)	Hughes (3–6)		41,320	30–40
71	June 20	@ Padres	L 3–6	Vincent (2–0)	**Guerrier** (2–3)		30,656	30–41
72	June 21	@ Padres	L 2–5	Stauffer (1–0)	**Kershaw** (5–5)	Street (15)	31,855	30–42
73	June 22	@ Padres	**W** 6–1	**Greinke** (4–2)	Vólquez (5–6)		43,267	31–42
74	June 23	@ Padres	**W** 3–1	**League** (3–3)	Street (0–4)	**Jansen** (4)	31,098	32–42
75	June 24	Giants	**W** 3–1	**Rodriguez** (2–2)	Bumgarner (7–5)	**Jansen** (5)	40,994	33–42
76	June 25	Giants	**W** 6–5	**Fife** (2–2)	Kickham (0–2)	**Rodriguez** (1)	47,193	34–42
77	June 26	Giants	**W** 4–2	**Kershaw** (6–5)	Lincecum (4–8)	**Jansen** (6)	41,721	35–42
78	June 27	Phillies	**W** 6–4	**Greinke** (5–2)	De Fratus (2–2)	**Jansen** (7)	51,037	36–42
79	June 28	Phillies	L 1–16	Lannan (1–2)	**Capuano** (2–5)		48,828	36–43
80	June 29	Phillies	**W** 4–3	**Jansen** (2–3)	De Fratus (2–3)		52,455	37–43
81	June 30	Phillies	**W** 6–1	**Fife** (3–2)	Kendrick (7–5)		42,405	38–43

July (19–6)

#	Date	Opponent	Score	Win	Loss	Save	Attendance	Record
82	July 2	@ Rockies	**W** 8–0	**Kershaw** (7–5)	Oswalt (0–3)		37,419	39–43
83	July 3	@ Rockies	**W** 10–8	**Greinke** (6–2)	Chatwood (4–2)	**Jansen** (8)	48,628	40–43
84	July 4	@ Rockies	L 5–9	Chacin (8–3)	**Capuano** (2–6)		48,794	40–44
85	July 5	@ Giants	**W** 10–2	**Ryu** (7–3)	Cain (5–5)		41,911	41–44
86	July 6	@ Giants	L 2–4	Bumgarner (9–5)	**Fife** (3–3)	Romo (20)	41,638	41–45
87	July 7	@ Giants	**W** 4–1	**Kershaw** (8–5)	Romo (3–4)	**Jansen** (9)	41,094	42–45
88	July 8	@ Diamondbacks	**W** 6–1	**Greinke** (7–2)	Delgado (1–3)		22,614	43–45
89	July 9	@ Diamondbacks	**W** 6–1	**Nolasco** (6–8)	Kennedy (3–5)		23,409	44–45
90	July 10	@ Diamondbacks	**W** 7–5 (14)	**Jansen** (3–3)	Collmenter (4–2)		24,466	45–45
91	July 11	Rockies	**W** 6–1	**Capuano** (3–6)	Pomeranz (0–3)		52,740	46–45
92	July 12	Rockies	L 0–3	Nicasio (5–4)	**Kershaw** (8–6)	Betancourt (14)	50,796	46–46
93	July 13	Rockies	**W** 1–0	**Greinke** (8–2)	Chatwood (5–3)		51,992	47–46
94	July 14	Rockies	L 1–3	Chacín (9–4)	**Nolasco** (6–9)	Betancourt (15)	51,402	47–47
95	July 19	@ Nationals	**W** 3–2	**Belisario** (4–5)	Soriano (1–2)	**Jansen** (10)	39,146	48–47
96	July 20	@ Nationals	**W** 3–1 (10)	**Withrow** (1–0)	Stammen (5–5)	**Jansen** (11)	41,816	49–47
97	July 21	@ Nationals	**W** 9–2	**Kershaw** (9–6)	Zimmermann (12–5)		34,758	50–47
98	July 22	@ Blue Jays	**W** 14–5	**Ryu** (8–3)	Johnson (1–6)		34,515	51–47
99	July 23	@ Blue Jays	**W** 10–9	**League** (4–3)	Oliver (3–2)	**Jansen** (12)	32,158	52–47
100	July 24	@ Blue Jays	**W** 8–3 (10)	**League** (5–3)	Pérez (1–2)		35,368	53–47
101	July 25	Reds	L 2–5	Latos (10–3)	**Greinke** (8–3)	Chapman (24)	53,275	53–48
102	July 26	Reds	**W** 2–1	**Kershaw** (10–6)	Bailey (5–10)	**Jansen** (13)	51,841	54–48
103	July 27	Reds	**W** 4–1	**Ryu** (9–3)	Arroyo (9–8)	**Jansen** (14)	52,675	55–48
104	July 28	Reds	**W** 1–0 (11)	**League** (6–3)	Partch (0–1)		48,671	56–48
105	July 30	Yankees	**W** 3–2	**Jansen** (4–3)	Kelley (3–1)		52,447	57–48
106	July 31	Yankees	L 0–3	Logan (3–2)	**Belisario** (4–6)	Rivera (34)	53,013	57–49

August (23–6)

#	Date	Opponent	Score	Win	Loss	Save	Attendance	Record
107	August 1	@ Cubs	**W** 6–4	**Nolasco** (7–9)	Rusin (1–1)	**Jansen** (15)	34,005	58–49
108	August 2	@ Cubs	**W** 6–2	**Ryu** (10–3)	Wood (7–8)		32,520	59–49
109	August 3	@ Cubs	**W** 3–0	**Capuano** (4–6)	Samardzija (6–10)	**Jansen** (16)	40,419	60–49
110	August 4	@ Cubs	**W** 1–0	**Fife** (4–3)	Villanueva (2–8)	**Jansen** (17)	38,409	61–49
111	August 5	@ Cardinals	**W** 3–2	**Greinke** (9–3)	Wainwright (13–7)	**Rodriguez** (2)	42,464	62–49
112	August 6	@ Cardinals	L 1–5	Kelly (3–3)	**Kershaw** (10–7)		41,770	62–50
113	August 7	@ Cardinals	**W** 13–4	**Nolasco** (8–9)	Westbrook (7–7)		43,535	63–50
114	August 8	@ Cardinals	**W** 5–1	**Ryu** (11–3)	Martínez (0–1)		42,567	64–50
115	August 9	Rays	**W** 7–6	**Belisario** (5–6)	Rodney (4–3)		51,083	65–50
116	August 10	Rays	**W** 5–0	**Greinke** (10–3)	Hernández (6–12)		52,619	66–50
117	August 11	Rays	**W** 8–2	**Kershaw** (11–7)	Hellickson (10–6)		52,248	67–50
118	August 12	Mets	**W** 4–2	**Nolasco** (9–9)	Mejía (1–2)	**Jansen** (18)	42,915	68–50
119	August 13	Mets	**W** 4–2	**Ryu** (12–3)	Harvey (9–4)	**Jansen** (19)	46,335	69–50
120	August 14	Mets	**W** 5–4 (12)	**Rodriguez** (3–2)	Feliciano (0–1)		44,091	70–50
121	August 16	@ Phillies	**W** 4–0	**Greinke** (11–3)	Lee (10–6)		36,964	71–50
122	August 17	@ Phillies	**W** 5–0	**Kershaw** (12–7)	Kendrick (10–10)		42,082	72–50
123	August 18	@ Phillies	L 2–3	Papelbon (3–1)	**League** (6–4)		40,336	72–51
124	August 19	@ Marlins	L 2–6	Fernández (9–6)	**Ryu** (12–4)		27,127	72–52
125	August 20	@ Marlins	**W** 6–4	**Withrow** (2–0)	Jennings (2–4)	**Jansen** (20)	25,690	73–52
126	August 21	@ Marlins	**W** 4–1	**Greinke** (12–3)	Eovaldi (2–4)	**Jansen** (21)	24,996	74–52
127	August 22	@ Marlins	**W** 6–0	**Kershaw** (13–7)	Álvarez (2–3)		25,609	75–52
128	August 23	Red Sox	**W** 2–0	**Nolasco** (10–9)	Lackey (9–10)	**Jansen** (22)	50,240	76–52
129	August 24	Red Sox	L 2–4	Lester (12–7)	**Ryu** (12–5)	Uehara (13)	48,165	76–53
130	August 25	Red Sox	L 1–8	Peavy (10–5)	**Capuano** (4–7)		44,109	76–54
131	August 26	Cubs	**W** 6–2	**Greinke** (13–3)	Arrieta (2–3)		40,965	77–54
132	August 27	Cubs	L 2–3	Wood (8–10)	**Kershaw** (13–8)	Gregg (27)	52,326	77–55
133	August 28	Cubs	**W** 4–0	**Nolasco** (11–9)	Jackson (7–14)		38,851	78–55
134	August 30	Padres	**W** 9–2	**Ryu** (13–5)	Stults (8–12)		51,769	79–55
135	August 31	Padres	**W** 2–1	**Wilson** (1–0)	Vincent (3–2)	**Jansen** (23)	53,121	80–55

September (12–15)

#	Date	Opponent	Score	Win	Loss	Save	Attendance	Record
136	September 1	Padres	**W** 2–1	**Greinke** (14–3)	Thayer (2–5)	**Jansen** (24)	52,168	81–55
137	September 2	@ Rockies	**W** 10–8	**Kershaw** (14–8)	Manship (0–5)	**Jansen** (25)	36,822	82–55
138	September 3	@ Rockies	**W** 7–4	**Nolasco** (12–9)	Chacín (13–8)	**Withrow** (1)	25,807	83–55
139	September 4	@ Rockies	L 5–7	de la Rosa (16–6)	**Vólquez** (9–11)	Brothers (15)	28,439	83–56
140	September 6	@ Reds	L 2–3	Leake (12–6)	**Howell** (2–1)	Chapman (35)	33,778	83–57
141	September 7	@ Reds	L 3–4 (10)	Hoover (4–5)	**Wilson** (1–1)		40,799	83–58
142	September 8	@ Reds	L 2–3	Chapman (4–5)	**Belisario** (5–7)		34,041	83–59
143	September 9	Diamondbacks	**W** 8–1	**Nolasco** (13–9)	Delgado (4–6)		52,410	84–59
144	September 10	Diamondbacks	**W** 5–3 (11)	**Withrow** (3–0)	Collmenter (4–3)		41,867	85–59
145	September 11	Diamondbacks	L 1–4	Corbin (14–6)	**Ryu** (13–6)	Ziegler (10)	40,818	85–60
146	September 12	Giants	**W** 3–2 (10)	**Wilson** (2–1)	Affeldt (1–5)		53,393	86–60
147	September 13	Giants	L 2–4	Bumgarner (12–9)	**Kershaw** (14–9)	Romo (34)	52,650	86–61
148	September 14	Giants	L 3–19	Lincecum (10–13)	**Nolasco** (13–10)		53,062	86–62
149	September 15	Giants	L 3–4	Machi (3–1)	**Rodriguez** (3–3)	Romo (35)	47,302	86–63
150	September 16	@ Diamondbacks	L 1–2	Cahill (7–10)	**Ryu** (13–7)	Ziegler (11)	24,933	86–64
151	September 17	@ Diamondbacks	**W** 9–3	**Greinke** (15–3)	Corbin (14–7)		26,304	87–64
152	September 18	@ Diamondbacks	L 4–9	McCarthy (5–9)	**Fife** (4–4)		27,305	87–65
153	September 19	@ Diamondbacks	**W** 7–6	**Howell** (3–1)	Collmenter (4–4)	**Jansen** (26)	22,763	88–65
154	September 20	@ Padres	L 0–2	Erlin (3–3)	**Vólquez** (9–12)	Street (32)	34,986	88–66
155	September 21	@ Padres	**W** 4–0	**Kershaw** (15–9)	Smith (1–2)		40,572	89–66
156	September 22	@ Padres	**W** 1–0	**Howell** (4–1)	Cashner (10–9)	**Jansen** (27)	32,988	90–66
157	September 24	@ Giants	**W** 2–1	**Ryu** (14–7)	Cain (8–10)	**Jansen** (28)	41,625	91–66
158	September 25	@ Giants	L 4–6	Zito (5–11)	**Nolasco** (13–11)	Romo (37)	41,377	91–67
159	September 26	@ Giants	L 2–3	Casilla (7–2)	**Rodriguez** (3–4)	Romo (38)	41,221	91–68
160	September 27	Rockies	**W** 11–0	**Kershaw** (16–9)	McHugh (0–4)		52,367	92–68
161	September 28	Rockies	L 0–1	Nicasio (9–9)	**Greinke** (15–4)	Brothers (18)	52,879	92–69
162	September 29	Rockies	L 1–2	Francis (3–5)	**Ryu** (14–8)	Brothers (19)	52,396	92–70

== Postseason ==
=== National League Division Series ===
As National League West champions, the Dodgers advanced to the 2013 National League Division Series to play the Eastern Division champion Atlanta Braves. They suffered a blow on the last day of the regular season when MRI results revealed that Matt Kemp had a severe ankle injury and was not able to play in the postseason. Andre Ethier was also dealing with an ankle injury and he was limited to pinch hitting in the division series.

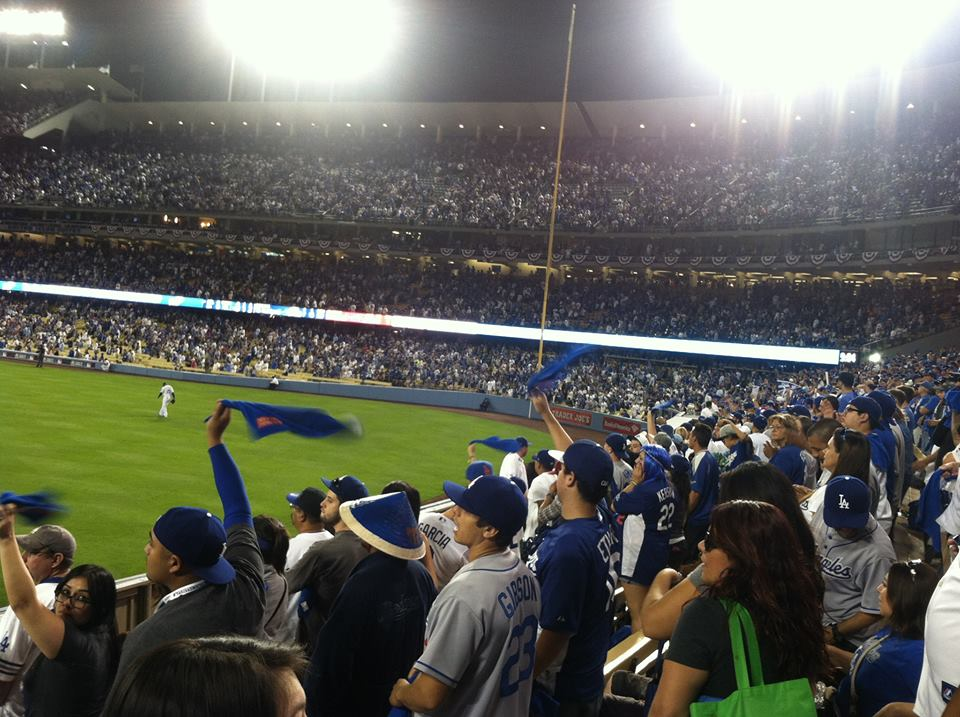
Dodger Stadium during Game 3 of the 2013 NLDS

In game 1 of the series, at Atlanta's Turner Field, Clayton Kershaw struck out 12 batters in 7 innings. That was the third most strikeouts by a Dodger pitcher in the playoffs, behind only Sandy Koufax (15 in the 1963 World Series) and Carl Erskine (14 in the 1953 World Series). His six straight strikeouts in the game tied an MLB post-season record held by five pitchers. The Dodgers won the game 6–1. The Braves tied up the series the next day, with a 4–3 win, as the Dodgers bullpen faltered. Hanley Ramírez homered and doubled twice in the game but it wasn't enough. Jason Heyward had a two-RBI single for the deciding runs.

The Dodgers offense took over in game 3 as they took the lead in the series with a 13–6 win at Dodger Stadium. Ramírez had two more extra base hits (a double and triple) in the game to tie the NLDS record and franchise record (Steve Garvey, Duke Snider) for most extra-base hits in the postseason. The 13 runs tied a franchise record set in the 1956 World Series. The Dodgers brought Kershaw back on short rest in game 4 and he pitched six innings, while allowing only two unearned runs (thanks to two Adrián González errors). Carl Crawford hit two solo homers in his first two at-bats, the first Dodger to do so in the playoffs since Shawn Green in the 2004 National League Division Series. An RBI double by José Constanza off Ronald Belisario in the 7th gave the Braves the lead, but the Dodgers went back up thanks to a two-run homer by Juan Uribe in the 8th off David Carpenter. Kenley Jansen closed it down in the ninth to preserve the 4–3 series clinching victory for the Dodgers.

=== National League Championship Series ===
The Dodgers advanced to the NLCS for the first time since 2009, where they faced off with the St. Louis Cardinals. In the first game of the series at Busch Stadium, Zack Greinke allowed only two runs in eight innings, while striking out a season high 10 batters, the first pitcher to strike out 10 Cardinals in a postseason game since Denny Galehouse in the 1944 World Series. Andre Ethier, making his first post-season start of the season after being limited to pinch hitting the previous round, just missed catching Carlos Beltrán's double at the fence to allow the two runs to score in the third. The Dodgers also managed two runs, on a single by Juan Uribe in the top of the third. The game remained tied into extra innings until Beltran recorded the walk-off hit off Kenley Jansen in the bottom of the 13th inning to give the Cardinals a 3–2 victory. This was the longest game in Dodgers post-season history since the 1916 World Series. In the second game, Clayton Kershaw and two relievers combined to allow only 2 hits and 1 run but that was enough as the Dodgers offense failed to score at all and they lost 1–0. Kershaw was the first starting pitcher in post-season history to lose a game while allowing no earned runs and two or fewer hits.

Hanley Ramírez sat out game two after getting hit by a pitch in the first game and was diagnosed with a fractured rib. However, he was back in the lineup for Game three at Dodger Stadium and had two hits and an RBI. Yasiel Puig snapped an 0 for 11 streak with an RBI triple and Hyun-jin Ryu pitched seven shutout innings as the Dodgers picked up their first victory of the series with a 3–0 victory. Ricky Nolasco got his first post-season start the next day and he allowed three runs in the third, on an RBI double by Matt Carpenter and a booming 2-run home run by Matt Holliday. Ramírez tried to play through the pain again, but struck out three times and was in noticeable pain when he was taken out in the seventh inning. The Dodgers offense again struggled to score runs and they lost 4–2 to fall to the brink of elimination. Greinke responded with seven strong innings in Game Five and the Dodgers offense came alive. The team hit four home runs, including two by Adrián González and held on to win 6–4, sending the series back to St. Louis. The four homers tied a Dodger post-season record that had previously been accomplished in Game 2 of the 1977 World Series and Game 1 of the 1978 NLCS.

In Game Six, Kershaw struggled from the start and he allowed seven runs on ten hits in four innings, his shortest start of the year. NLCS MVP Michael Wacha shut out the Dodgers for the second time in the series and the Dodgers season came to an end with a 9–0 blowout loss.

=== Postseason Game log ===
2013 Postseason
National League Division Series (3–1)

Game	Date	Opponent	Score	Win	Loss	Save	Attendance	Series
1	October 3	@ Braves	W 6–1	Kershaw (1–0)	Medlen (0–1)		43,021	1–0
2	October 4	@ Braves	L 3–4	Minor (1–0)	Greinke (0–1)	Kimbrel (1)	48,966	1–1
3	October 6	Braves	W 13–6	Capuano (1–0)	Teherán (0–1)		54,646	2–1
4	October 7	Braves	W 4–3	Wilson (1–0)	Carpenter (0–1)	Jansen (1)	54,438	3–1

National League Championship Series (2–4)

Game	Date	Opponent	Score	Win	Loss	Save	Attendance	Series
1	October 11	@ Cardinals	L 2–3 (13)	Lynn (1–0)	Withrow (0–1)		46,691	0–1
2	October 12	@ Cardinals	L 0–1	Wacha (1–0)	Kershaw (0–1)	Rosenthal (1)	46,872	0–2
3	October 14	Cardinals	W 3–0	Ryu (1–0)	Wainwright (0–1)	Jansen (1)	53,940	1–2
4	October 15	Cardinals	L 2–4	Lynn (2–0)	Nolasco (0–1)	Rosenthal (2)	53,992	1–3
5	October 16	Cardinals	W 6–4	Greinke (1–0)	Kelly (0–1)		53,183	2–3
6	October 18	@ Cardinals	L 0–9	Wacha (2–0)	Kershaw (0–2)		46,899	2–4

== Roster ==
2013 Los Angeles Dodgers
Roster
Pitchers: 61 Josh Beckett; 51,54 Ronald Belisario; 58 Chad Billingsley; 35 Chris Capuano; 60 José Dominguez; 59 Stephen Fife; 98 Onelki García; 21 Zack Greinke; 48 Javy Guerra; 55,54 Matt Guerrier; 56 J. P. Howell; 74 Kenley Jansen; 22 Clayton Kershaw; 31,43 Brandon League; 29 Ted Lilly; 36 Matt Magill; 49 Carlos Mármol; 41 Peter Moylan; 47 Ricky Nolasco; 75 Paco Rodriguez; 99 Hyun-Jin Ryu; 38 Shawn Tolleson; 30 Edinson Vólquez; 46 Josh Wall; 00 Brian Wilson; 44 Chris Withrow	Catchers: 31 Drew Butera; 17 A. J. Ellis; 18 Tim Federowicz; 33,55 Ramón Hernández; Infielders: 47 Luis Cruz; 14 Mark Ellis; 23 Adrián González; 9 Dee Gordon; 6 Jerry Hairston Jr.; 7 Nick Punto; 13 Hanley Ramírez; 28 Justin Sellers; 5 Juan Uribe; 10 Michael Young	Outfielders: 48 Nick Buss; 49,26 Alex Castellanos; 25 Carl Crawford; 16 Andre Ethier; 37 Elián Herrera; 27 Matt Kemp; 66 Yasiel Puig; 3,55 Skip Schumaker; 33 Scott Van Slyke	Manager: 8 Don Mattingly; Coaches: 50 Chuck Crim (bullpen); 85 Rob Flippo (bullpen catcher); 45 Trey Hillman (bench); 40 Rick Honeycutt (pitching); 43 Ken Howell (assistant pitching); 86 Fumi Ishibashi (bullpen catcher); 15 Davey Lopes (first base); 12 Mark McGwire (hitting coach); 11 Manny Mota (coach); 52 John Valentin (assistant hitting); 26,29 Tim Wallach (third base); 7 Steve Yeager (catching coach)

== Player stats ==
=== Batting ===
List does not include pitchers. Stats in bold are the team leaders.

Note: G = Games played; AB = At bats; R = Runs; H = Hits; 2B = Doubles; 3B = Triples; HR = Home runs; RBI = Runs batted in; BB = Walks; SO = Strikeouts; SB = Stolen bases; Avg. = Batting average OBP = On-base percentage; SLG = Slugging; OPS = On-base plus slugging

Player	G	AB	R	H	2B	3B	HR	RBI	BB	SO	SB	AVG	OBP	SLG	OPS
Adrián González	**157**	**583**	**69**	**171**	32	0	**22**	**100**	47	**98**	1	**.293**	.342	**.461**	**.803**
Andre Ethier	142	482	54	131	**33**	2	12	52	**61**	95	4	.272	**.360**	.423	.783
Carl Crawford	116	435	62	123	30	**3**	6	31	28	66	**15**	.283	.329	.407	.736
Mark Ellis	126	433	46	117	13	2	6	48	26	74	4	.270	.323	.351	.674
A. J. Ellis	115	390	43	93	17	1	10	52	45	78	0	.238	.318	.364	.682
Juan Uribe	132	388	47	108	22	2	12	50	30	81	5	.278	.331	.438	.769
Yasiel Puig	104	382	66	122	21	2	19	42	36	97	11	.319	.391	.534	.925
Skip Schumaker	125	319	31	84	16	0	2	30	28	54	2	.263	.332	.332	.665
Hanley Ramírez	86	304	62	105	25	2	20	57	27	52	10	.345	.402	.638	1.040
Nick Punto	116	294	34	75	15	0	2	21	33	67	3	.255	.328	.327	.655
Matt Kemp	73	263	35	71	15	0	6	33	22	76	9	.270	.328	.395	.723
Jerry Hairston Jr.	96	204	17	43	7	0	2	22	14	22	0	.211	.265	.275	.539
Tim Federowicz	56	160	12	37	8	0	4	16	10	56	0	.231	.275	.356	.631
Scott Van Slyke	53	129	13	31	8	0	7	19	20	37	1	.240	.342	.465	.807
Luis Cruz	45	118	12	15	2	0	1	6	5	20	0	.127	.175	.169	.344
Dee Gordon	38	94	9	22	1	1	1	6	10	21	10	.234	.314	.298	.612
Justin Sellers	27	69	6	13	1	0	1	2	5	20	0	.188	.263	.246	.510
Michael Young	21	51	3	16	2	1	0	4	1	5	0	.314	.321	.392	.713
Ramón Hernandez	17	48	4	10	2	0	3	6	6	7	1	.208	.291	.438	.728
Nick Buss	8	19	0	2	0	0	0	0	1	1	0	.105	.150	.105	.255
Alex Castellanos	8	18	2	3	1	0	1	1	0	5	0	.167	.167	.389	.556
Elian Herrera	4	8	0	2	0	0	0	0	0	2	0	.250	.250	.250	.500
Drew Butera	4	7	0	1	0	0	0	0	0	4	0	.143	.143	.143	.286
Non-Pitcher Totals	162	5198	627	1395	271	16	137	598	455	1038	76	.268	.331	.406	.737
**Team totals**	**162**	**5491**	**649**	**1447**	**281**	**17**	**138**	**618**	**476**	**1146**	**78**	**.264**	**.326**	**.396**	**.722**

=== Pitching ===
Stats in bold are the team leaders.

Note: W = Wins; L = Losses; ERA = Earned run average; G = Games pitched; GS = Games started; SV = Saves; IP = Innings pitched; H = Hits allowed; R = Runs allowed; ER = Earned runs allowed; BB = Walks allowed; K = Strikeouts

Player	W	L	ERA	G	GS	SV	IP	H	R	ER	BB	K
Clayton Kershaw	**16**	**9**	**1.83**	33	**33**	0	**236.0**	164	55	48	**52**	**232**
Hyun-jin Ryu	14	8	3.00	30	30	0	192.0	**182**	**67**	**64**	49	154
Zack Greinke	15	4	2.63	28	28	0	177.2	152	54	52	46	148
Chris Capuano	4	7	4.26	24	20	0	105.2	125	57	50	24	81
Ricky Nolasco	8	2	3.52	16	15	0	87.0	83	40	34	21	75
Kenley Jansen	4	3	1.88	75	0	**28**	76.2	48	16	16	18	111
Ronald Belisario	5	7	3.97	**77**	0	1	68.0	72	34	30	28	49
J. P. Howell	4	1	2.03	67	0	0	62.0	42	14	14	23	54
Stephen Fife	4	4	3.86	12	10	0	58.1	69	29	25	20	45
Brandon League	6	4	5.30	58	0	14	54.1	69	37	32	15	28
Paco Rodriguez	3	4	2.32	76	0	2	54.1	30	15	14	19	63
Josh Beckett	0	5	5.19	8	8	0	43.1	50	30	25	15	41
Chris Withrow	3	0	2.60	26	0	1	34.2	20	10	10	13	43
Matt Guerrier	2	3	4.80	34	0	0	30.0	32	18	16	12	21
Edinson Volquez	0	2	4.18	6	5	0	28.0	25	14	13	8	26
Matt Magill	0	2	6.51	6	6	0	27.2	27	25	20	28	26
Ted Lilly	0	2	5.09	5	5	0	23.0	27	16	13	10	18
Carlos Mármol	0	0	2.53	21	0	0	21.1	14	7	6	19	27
Peter Moylan	1	0	6.46	14	0	0	15.1	23	11	11	7	6
Brian Wilson	2	1	0.66	18	0	0	13.2	8	1	1	4	13
Chad Billingsley	1	0	3.00	2	2	0	12.0	12	4	4	5	6
Javy Guerra	0	0	6.75	9	0	0	10.2	15	9	8	6	12
José Dominguez	0	0	2.16	9	0	0	8.1	11	3	2	3	4
Josh Wall	0	1	18.00	6	0	0	7.0	17	14	14	6	7
Onelki García	0	0	13.50	3	0	0	1.1	1	2	2	4	1
Shawn Tolleson	0	0	----	1	0	0	0.0	0	0	0	2	0
**Team totals**	**92**	**70**	**3.25**	**162**	**162**	**46**	**1450.1**	**1321**	**582**	**524**	**460**	**1292**

== Awards and honors ==
- 2013 Major League Baseball All-Star Game

Clayton Kershaw

- National League Cy Young Award

Clayton Kershaw

- National League Silver Slugger Award

Zack Greinke

- National League Player of the Month
  - Yasiel Puig (June)
- National League Pitcher of the Month
  - Clayton Kershaw (July)
  - Zack Greinke (August)
- National League Player of the Week
  - Clayton Kershaw (March 31 – April 7)
  - Yasiel Puig (June 3–9)
- National League Rookie of the Month
  - Yasiel Puig (June)
- Branch Rickey Award
  - Clayton Kershaw
- Warren Spahn Award
  - Clayton Kershaw
- Sporting News National League All-Star Team
  - Clayton Kershaw Starting Pitcher
- Baseball America All-Rookie team
  - Hyun-Jin Ryu Starting Pitcher
  - Yasiel Puig Outfielder
- Player's Choice Award for NL's Outstanding pitcher
  - Clayton Kershaw

== Transactions ==
=== April 2013 ===
- On April 6, traded RHP Aaron Harang and cash to the Colorado Rockies in exchange for C Ramón Hernández.
- On April 9, optioned C Tim Federowicz to AAA Albuquerque.
- On April 10, activated RHP Chad Billingsley from the 15-day disabled list.
- On April 12, placed RHP Zack Greinke on the 15-day disabled list with a broken collarbone, and recalled RHP Shawn Tolleson from AAA Albuquerque.
- On April 15, placed RHP Shawn Tolleson on the 15-day disabled list with a lower back strain, retroactive to April 13, and recalled RHP Josh Wall from AAA Albuquerque.
- On April 17, placed LHP Chris Capuano on the 15-day disabled list with a strained left calf, and recalled C Tim Federowicz from AAA Albuquerque.
- On April 21, placed RHP Chad Billingsley on the 15-day disabled list with right elbow pain, and recalled RHP Stephen Fife from AAA Albuquerque.
- On April 24, activated LHP Ted Lilly from the 15-day disabled list and optioned C Tim Federowicz to AAA Albuquerque.
- On April 27, placed RHP Stephen Fife on the 15-day disabled list with right shoulder bursitis, retroactive to April 22, and recalled RHP Matt Magill from AAA Albuquerque.
- On April 29, activated SS Hanley Ramírez from the 15-day disabled list and placed LHP Clayton Kershaw on the bereavement list.
- On April 30, optioned RHP Josh Wall to AAA Albuquerque and recalled RHP Javy Guerra from AAA Albuquerque.

=== May 2013 ===
- On May 3, placed LHP Ted Lilly on the 15-day disabled list with a strained rib-cage muscle, retroactive to April 30, and activated LHP Clayton Kershaw from the bereavement list.
- On May 4, placed IF Hanley Ramírez on the 15-day disabled list with a strained left hamstring, and recalled SS Dee Gordon from AAA Albuquerque.
- On May 6, placed IF Mark Ellis on the 15-day disabled list, retroactive to April 27, with a strained right groin, and activated LHP Chris Capuano from the 15-day disabled list.
- On May 7, placed IF/OF Jerry Hairston Jr. on the 15-day disabled list, retroactive to May 6, with a left groin strain and recalled IF/OF Elián Herrera from AAA Albuquerque.
- On May 8, recalled C Tim Federowicz from AAA Albuquerque and optioned IF Justin Sellers to AAA Albuquerque.
- On May 10, optioned IF/OF Elián Herrera to AAA Albuquerque, purchased the contract of 1B/OF Scott Van Slyke from AAA Albuquerque and transferred RHP Chad Billingsley from the 15-day disabled list to the 60-day disabled list.
- On May 15, placed RHP Josh Beckett on the 15-day disabled list with a left groin strain, retroactive to May 14, and activated RHP Zack Greinke from the 15-day disabled list.
- On May 19, activated IF Mark Ellis from the 15-day disabled list and optioned C Tim Federowicz to AAA Albuquerque.
- On May 20, activated LHP Ted Lilly from the 15-day disabled list and optioned RHP Matt Magill to AAA Albuquerque.
- On May 27, activated IF/OF Jerry Hairston Jr. from the 15-day disabled list and optioned SS Dee Gordon to AAA Albuquerque.
- On May 30, placed OF Matt Kemp on the 15-day disabled list with a right hamstring strain, recalled C Tim Federowicz from AAA Albuquerque, activated RHP Stephen Fife from the 15-day disabled list, and optioned Fife to AAA Albuquerque.
- On May 31, optioned RHP Javy Guerra to AAA Albuquerque, transferred LHP Scott Elbert from the 15-day disabled list to the 60-day disabled list, and purchased the contract of RHP Peter Moylan from AAA Albuquerque.

=== June 2013 ===
- On June 2, placed C A. J. Ellis on the 15-day disabled list, retroactive to May 30, with a strained oblique and recalled RHP Matt Magill from AAA Albuquerque.
- On June 3, optioned RHP Matt Magill to AAA Albuquerque and recalled OF Yasiel Puig from AA Chattanooga. Placed OF Carl Crawford on the 15-day disabled list with a left hamstring strain and recalled RHP Stephen Fife from AAA Albuquerque.
- On June 4, activated SS Hanley Ramírez from the 15-day disabled list and placed LHP Chris Capuano on the 15-day disabled list, retroactive to May 30, with a left shoulder Latissimus Strain.
- On June 9, placed LHP Ted Lilly on the 15-day disabled list, retroactive to June 5, with a neck sprain and recalled RHP Matt Magill from AAA Albuquerque.
- On June 10, optioned RHP Matt Magill to AAA Albuquerque and recalled IF Justin Sellers from AAA Albuquerque.
- On June 11, optioned IF Justin Sellers to AAA Albuquerque, placed OF Scott Van Slyke on the 15-day disabled list with left shoulder bursitis, and recalled RHP Chris Withrow and OF Alex Castellanos from AAA Albuquerque.
- On June 14, designated C Ramón Hernández for assignment and activated C A. J. Ellis from the 15-day disabled list.
- On June 15, claimed C John Baker off waivers from the San Diego Padres and optioned him to AAA Albuquerque.
- On June 19, activated LHP Chris Capuano from the 15-day disabled list and optioned OF Alex Castellanos to AAA Albuquerque.
- On June 20, recalled IF/OF Elián Herrera from AAA Albuquerque and optioned RHP Chris Withrow to AAA Albuquerque.
- On June 25, activated OF Matt Kemp from the 15-day disabled list and optioned IF/OF Elián Herrera to AAA Albuquerque.
- On June 28, activated 1B/OF Scott Van Slyke from the 15-day disabled list and designated IF Luis Cruz for assignment.
- On June 29, optioned RHP Peter Moylan to AAA Albuquerque and purchased the contract of RHP José Dominguez from AAA Albuquerque.
- On June 30, recalled RHP Chris Withrow from AAA Albuquerque and designated RHP Matt Guerrier for assignment.

=== July 2013 ===
- On July 2, traded RHP Matt Guerrier to the Chicago Cubs in exchange for RHP Carlos Mármol.
- On July 4, sent RHP Carlos Mármol outright to AAA Albuquerque.
- On July 5, activated OF Carl Crawford from the 15-day disabled list and optioned 1B/OF Scott Van Slyke to AAA Albuquerque.
- On July 6, traded RHPs Josh Wall, Steve Ames and Ángel Sánchez to the Miami Marlins for RHP Ricky Nolasco.
- On July 8, placed OF Matt Kemp (acromioclavicular joint irritation in his left shoulder) and RHP Stephen Fife (right shoulder bursitis) on the 15-day disabled list, recalled OF Scott Van Slyke from AAA Albuquerque, and activated RHP Ricky Nolasco.
- On July 21, activated OF Matt Kemp from the 15-day disabled list and optioned OF/1B Scott Van Slyke to AAA Albuquerque.
- On July 23, placed RHP Jose Dominguez on the 15-day disabled list with a strained left quad muscle and purchased the contract of RHP Carlos Mármol from AA Chattanooga.
- On July 24, placed OF Matt Kemp on the 15-day disabled list, retroactive to July 22, with a left ankle sprain and activated LHP Ted Lilly from the 15-day disabled list.
- On July 25, recalled IF/OF Elián Herrera from AAA Albuquerque and designated LHP Ted Lilly for assignment.
- On July 30, signed free agent RHP Brian Wilson to a one-year contract.
- On July 31, acquired C Drew Butera from the Minnesota Twins for a player to be named later or cash and optioned Butera to AAA Albuquerque. Recalled OF/1B Scott Van Slyke from AAA Albuquerque and optioned IF/OF Elián Herrera to AAA Albuquerque.

=== August 2013 ===
- On August 1, placed RHP Brian Wilson on the 15-day disabled list (Tommy John surgery in April 2012).
- On August 4, activated RHP Stephen Fife from the 15-day disabled list, and optioned OF/1B Scott Van Slyke to AAA Albuquerque.
- On August 5, recalled SS Dee Gordon from AAA Albuquerque and optioned RHP Stephen Fife to AAA Albuquerque. Outrighted C John Baker to AAA Albuquerque.
- On August 13, traded LHP Miguel Sulbaran to the Minnesota Twins as the player to be named in the July 31 trade.
- On August 16, recalled OF/1B Scott Van Slyke from AAA Albuquerque and optioned SS Dee Gordon to AAA Albuquerque.
- On August 19, activated RHP Brian Wilson from the 15-day disabled list and optioned OF/1B Scott Van Slyke to AAA Albuquerque.
- On August 30, signed free agent RHP Edinson Vólquez for the duration of the 2013 season and optioned RHP Chris Withrow to AAA Albuquerque.
- On August 31, acquired IF Michael Young from the Philadelphia Phillies in exchange for LHP Rob Rasmussen. Transferred RHP Josh Beckett from the 15-day disabled list to the 60-day disabled list.

=== September 2013 ===
- On September 1, recalled RHP Stephen Fife, RHP Peter Moylan, C Drew Butera, SS Dee Gordon and 1B/OF Scott Van Slyke from AAA Albuquerque.
- On September 3, recalled RHP Chris Withrow from AAA Albuquerque.
- On September 11, purchased the contract of LHP Onelki García from AAA Albuquerque and transferred RHP Shawn Tolleson from the 15-day disabled list to the 60-day disabled list.
- On September 14, recalled OF Alex Castellanos from AAA Albuquerque, purchased the contract of OF Nick Buss from AAA Albuquerque and transferred RHP José Dominguez from the 15-day disabled list to the 60-day disabled list.
- On September 16, activated OF Matt Kemp from the 15-day disabled list.

=== October 2013 ===
- On October 17, claimed OF Mike Baxter off waivers from the New York Mets and designated OF Alex Castellanos for assignment.

== Farm system ==
Level	Team	League	Manager	W	L	Position
AAA	Albuquerque Isotopes	Pacific Coast League	Lorenzo Bundy	76	68	2nd Place
AA	Chattanooga Lookouts	Southern League	Jody Reed	59	80	Last Place
High A	Rancho Cucamonga Quakes	California League	Carlos Subero	65	75	3rd Place
A	Great Lakes Loons	Midwest League	Razor Shines	67	72	5th place
Rookie	Ogden Raptors	Pioneer League	Damon Berryhill	36	40	3rd place
Rookie	Arizona League Dodgers	Arizona League	P. J. Forbes	34	22	1st place Lost in Championship
Rookie	DSL Dodgers	Dominican Summer League	Pedro Mega	27	43	7th place

=== Minor League statistical leaders ===
==== Batting ====
- Average:Adam Law – Ogden – .343
- Home Runs:Scott Schebler – Rancho Cucamonga – 27
- RBI: Nick Buss – Albuquerque – 100
- OBP: Adam Law – Ogden – .405
- SLG: Scott Schebler – Rancho Cucamonga – .581

==== Pitching ====
- ERA: Ross Stripling – Chattanooga – 2.82
- Wins: Geoff Brown – Great Lakes – 12
- Strikeouts: Lindsey Caughel – Rancho Cucamonga – 138
- Saves:Yimi García – Chattanooga – 19
- WHIP: Ross Stripling – Chattanooga – 1.14

==== Mid-Season All-Stars ====
- All-Star Futures Game

Outfielder Joc Pederson (USA Team)

- Pacific Coast League All-Stars

Outfielder Nick Buss

- Southern League All-Stars

Pitcher Zach Lee
Pitcher Ross Stripling
Pitcher Yimi García
Pitcher Hector Nelo
Pitcher Rob Rasmussen
Pitcher Luis Vasquez
Infielder Rafael Ynoa
Outfielder Joc Pederson

- California League All-Stars

Third Baseman Ryan Mount
Outfielder Noel Cuevas

- Midwest League All-Stars

Pitcher Jharel Cotton
Designated Hitter Tyler Ogle

==== Post-Season All-Stars ====
- Pacific Coast League All-Stars

Outfielder Nick Buss

- Southern League

Outfielder Joc Pederson

- California League

Outfielder Scott Schebler

- Midwest League

Left-handed relief pitcher Geoff Brown

- Pioneer League

Outfielder Jacob Scavuzzo

==== Notes ====
- Pitcher Zach Lee and outfielder Scott Schebler were named the Dodgers minor league pitcher and player of the year for 2013.
- The Class-A-Advanced Rancho Cucamonga Quakes qualified for the California League playoffs, thanks to a 10-inning walk off win over the Lancaster JetHawks on September 1. They lost the South Division semi-finals to the Inland Empire 66ers of San Bernardino in 3 games.
- The Class-A Great Lakes Loons clinched a Midwest League playoff spot with a 3–0 win over the Dayton Dragons on August 29. The Loons lost in two games in the Eastern Division semi-finals to the South Bend Silver Hawks.
- The Rookie-class Arizona League Dodgers lost to the Arizona League Giants in the Arizona League Championship Game.
- Shortstop Corey Seager, catchers Pratt Maynard and Chris O'Brien, outfielder Brian Cavazos-Galvez and pitchers Onelki García, Mike Thomas, Shawn Tolleson and Yimi García were selected to participate in the Arizona Fall League as members of the Glendale Desert Dogs. Seager and Yimi Garcia were selected to the Fall Stars Game at the conclusion of the AFL season.

== Major League Baseball draft ==
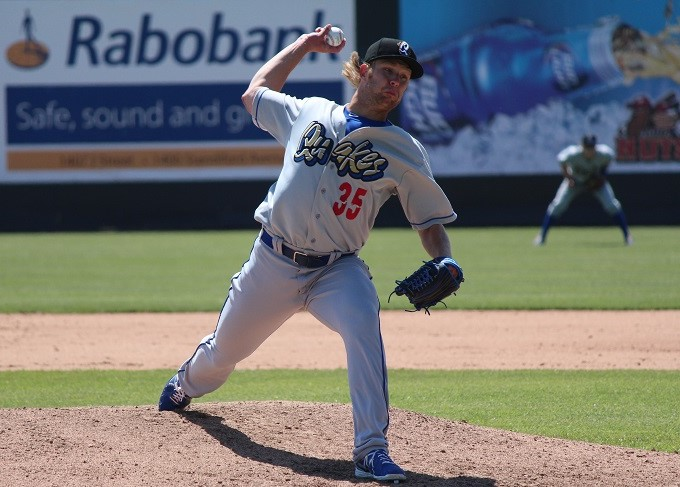
Chris Anderson

The Dodgers selected 40 players in this draft. Of those, six of them played Major League Baseball.

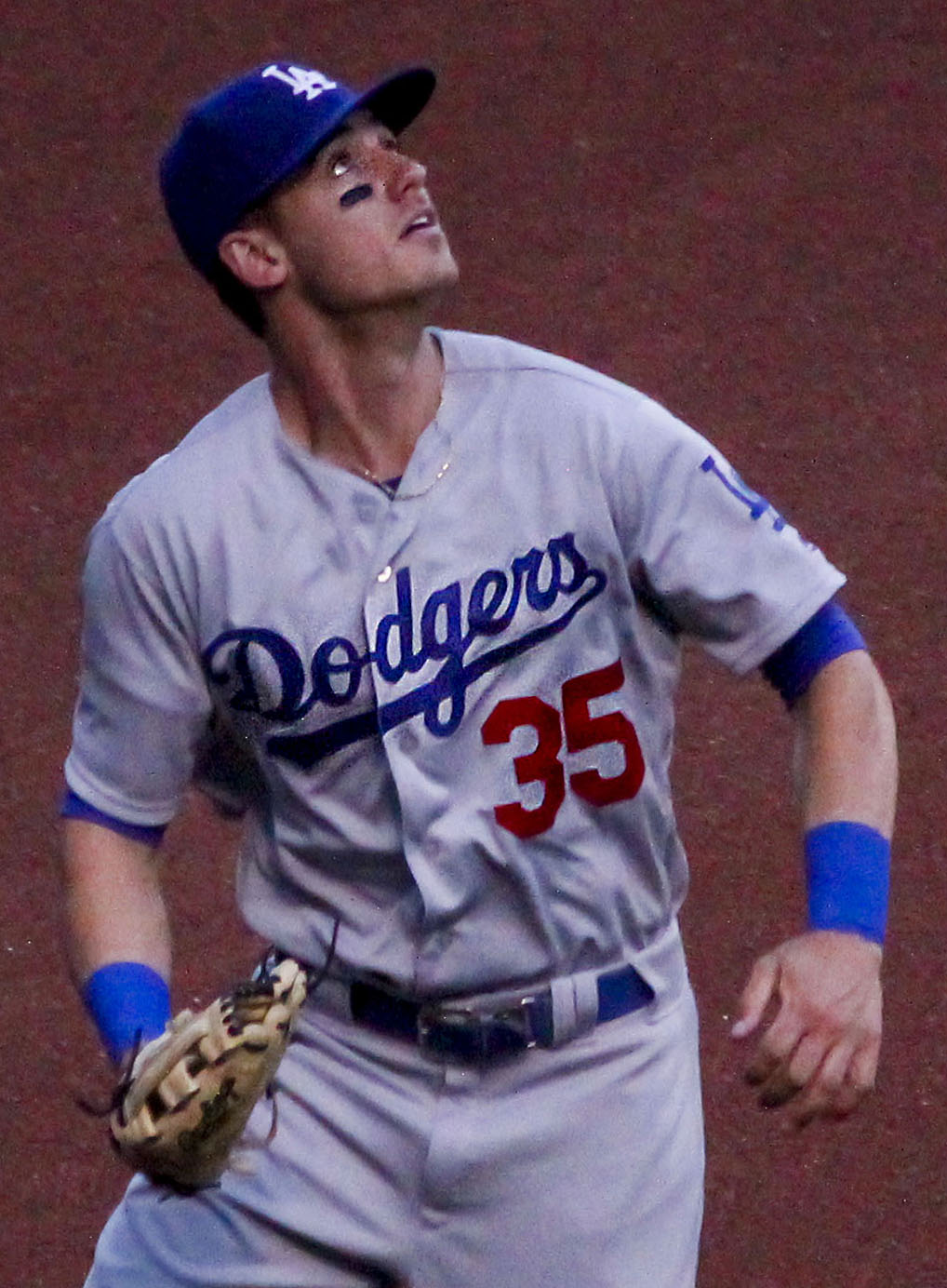
Cody Bellinger

The first round draft pick was right-handed pitcher Chris Anderson from Jacksonville University. He pitched in the Dodgers system through 2016 before he was released, accumulating a record of 23–26 with a 4.75 ERA in 104 games (three of them in the Minnesota Twins farm system in 2017) and 72 starts with a 4.75 ERA.

The Fourth round pick Cody Bellinger from Hamilton High School became the 2017 NL Rookie of the Year and 2019 NL MVP, Gold Glove Award, and Silver Slugger Award.

2013 draft picks

Round	Name	Position	School	Signed	Career span	Highest level
1	Chris Anderson	RHP	Jacksonville University	Yes	2013–2017	AAA
2	Tom Windle	LHP	University of Minnesota	Yes	2013–2022	AAA
3	Brandon Dixon	3B	University of Arizona	Yes	2013–2023	MLB
4	Cody Bellinger	1B	Hamilton High School	Yes	2013–present	MLB
5	J. D. Underwood		Palm Beach Community College	Yes	2013–2015	A
6	Jacob Rhame	RHP	Grayson County College	Yes	2013–2021	MLB
7	Brandon Trinkwon	SS	University of California, Santa Barbara	Yes	2013–2016	AA
8	Kyle Farmer	C	University of Georgia	Yes	2013–present	MLB
9	Henry Yates	LF	Texas Wesleyan University	Yes	2013	Rookie
10	Nick Keener	RHP	Mansfield University of Pennsylvania	Yes	2013	Rookie
11	Spencer Navin	C	Vanderbilt University	Yes	2013–2017	A+
12	Adam Law	3B	Brigham Young University	Yes	2013–2018	AAA
13	Ty Damron	LHP	Krum High School	No; Athletics-2016	2016–2022	AAA
14	Michael Johnson	LHP	Dartmouth College	Yes	2013–2019	AAA
15	Billy Flamion	LHP	Grossmont College	Yes	2013–2014	Rookie
16	Peter Miller	RHP	Florida State University	No; Mariners-2014	2014–2015	A
17	Greg Harris	RHP	Los Alamitos High School	Yes	2013–2017	AAA
18	James McDonald	2B	Arizona State University	Yes	2013–2014	A+
19	Blake Hennessey	SS	Arlington Country Day School	Yes	2013–2014	Rookie
20	Michael Ahmed	LF	College of the Holy Cross	Yes	2013–2019	AAA
21	James Baune	RHP	Southern Arkansas University	Yes	2013–2014	A
22	Jake Fisher	LHP	University of Oklahoma	Yes	2013–2019	Rookie
23	MJ Villegas	RHP	Seton Catholic High School	Yes	2014–2016	Rookie
24	José De León	RHP	Southern University and A&M College	Yes	2013–present	MLB
25	Kyle Hooper	RHP	University of California, Irvine	Yes	2013–2016	AA
26	Thomas Taylor	RHP	University of Kansas	Yes	2013	A
27	Tanner Kiest	RHP	Riverside Community College	No; Phillies-2014	2014–2016	Rookie
28	Crayton Bare	LHP	Baylor University	Yes	2013	A
29	Sam Finfer	C	Interlake High School	No		
30	Ryan Scott	C	Notre Dame Prep	Yes	2013–2019	AAA
31	Andrew McWilliam	3B	Westview High School	No		
32	Rob Rogers	RHP	Keystone College	Yes	2013–2018	AAA
33	Tyger Pederson	2B	University of the Pacific	Yes	2013–2016	Rookie
34	Rob Cerfolio	LHP	Yale University	No		
35	Kaleb Holbrook	C	South Georgia College	No		
36	James Lynch	RF	Glendale Community College	No; Blue Jays-2014	2014–2015	A-
37	Justin Dunn	RHP	Gunnery High School	No; Mets-2016	2016–present	MLB
38	Dillon Moyer	SS	University of California, San Diego	Yes	2013–2016	A+
39	Jake Sidwell	C	Olympia High School	No		
40	Matt Haggerty	CF	Seton Catholic High School	No		
