= Nick Buss =

American baseball player (born 1986)

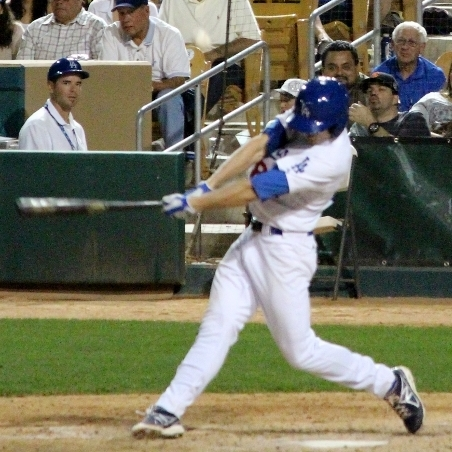
- Buss with the Los Angeles Dodgers
- Outfielder
- Born: December 15, 1986 (age 39); Southfield, Michigan, U.S.
- Batted: Left Threw: Right

MLB debut
- September 14, 2013, for the Los Angeles Dodgers

Last MLB appearance
- October 2, 2016, for the Los Angeles Angels

MLB statistics
- Batting average: .180
- Home runs: 1
- Runs batted in: 8
- Stolen bases: 2
- Stats at Baseball Reference

Teams
- Los Angeles Dodgers (2013); Los Angeles Angels (2016)

Nicholas Gregory Buss (born December 15, 1986) is an American former professional baseball outfielder. He played in Major League Baseball (MLB) for the Los Angeles Dodgers and Los Angeles Angels.

== Career ==
=== Los Angeles Dodgers ===
Buss was originally drafted by the Los Angeles Dodgers in the 35th round of the 2006 MLB draft out of San Diego Mesa College but did not sign and was later drafted by the Dodgers in the 8th round of the 2008 MLB draft out of the University of Southern California. He went to high school at De La Salle Collegiate High School.

He began his professional career with the Ogden Raptors in 2008 and was promoted to the Great Lakes Loons in 2009 and to the Inland Empire 66ers of San Bernardino midway through 2010. In 2011, he hit .328 with the Rancho Cucamonga Quakes in the California League. Buss played with the Double–A Chattanooga Lookouts in 2012 and in 2013 he was promoted to the Triple–A Albuquerque Isotopes, where he was selected as a starter for the mid-season Pacific Coast League All-Star team. He also made the post-season All-Star team and hit .303 with 17 homers and 100 RBI in 131 games.

The Dodgers called him up to the Majors for the first time on September 14, 2013. He entered the game that night in the third inning as a pinch hitter and remained in the game in the outfield. He had one hit in three at-bats in his debut, with his first hit being a single to right field off of Tim Lincecum. In 8 games with the Dodgers, he hit .105 (2 hits in 19 at-bats).

He was designated for assignment on May 1, 2014.

=== Oakland Athletics ===
On May 4, 2014, Buss was claimed off waivers by the Oakland Athletics and optioned to the Triple–A Sacramento River Cats.

=== Arizona Diamondbacks ===
In 2015, Buss played the whole season with the Arizona Diamondbacks' Triple–A affiliate. He hit .296 with four home runs in 92 games for the Reno Aces.

=== Los Angeles Angels ===
On December 10, 2015, Buss signed a minor league deal with the Los Angeles Angels of Anaheim. After competing in spring training, Buss opened the season with the Salt Lake Bees of the PCL. Buss was added to the Angels' roster on August 13. He hit his first MLB home run on August 23 off of Toronto Blue Jays pitcher R. A. Dickey.

=== San Diego Padres ===
On January 24, 2017, Buss signed a minor league contract with the San Diego Padres organization. In 114 games for the Triple–A El Paso Chihuahuas, he hit .348/.395/.541 with 11 home runs and 55 RBI. Buss elected free agency following the season on November 6.

=== Minnesota Twins ===
On January 3, 2018, Buss signed a minor league contract with an invite to spring training with the Minnesota Twins. He was released on June 22, 2018.
