= 2007 San Francisco Giants season =

2007 San Francisco Giants
- League: National League
- Division: West
- Ballpark: AT&T Park
- City: San Francisco, California
- Record: 71–91 (.438)
- Divisional place: 5th
- Owners: Peter Magowan
- General managers: Brian Sabean
- Managers: Bruce Bochy
- Television: KTVU (FOX 2); FSN Bay Area; Jon Miller, Duane Kuiper, Mike Krukow
- Radio: KNBR (680AM); Jon Miller, Duane Kuiper, Greg Papa, Dave Flemming, Mike Krukow; KLOK (Spanish)

The 2007 San Francisco Giants season was the Giants' 125th year in Major League Baseball, their 50th year in San Francisco since their move from New York following the 1957 season, and their eighth at AT&T Park. The team finished in fifth place in the National League West with a 71–91 record, 19 games behind the Arizona Diamondbacks. The Giants also hosted the All-Star Game on July 10. Their season began with the team attempting to return to the post-season for the first time since 2003. New manager Bruce Bochy was hired to help the club improve on a 76 win season in 2006. Giants left fielder Barry Bonds entered 2007 with 21 home runs shy of tying Hank Aaron for most career home runs. On August 7, 2007, Bonds broke the all-time home run record with his 756th career home run and 22nd of the season. The rotation was bolstered by the arrival of Barry Zito, who was signed to the largest contract ever for a pitcher during the off-season. On September 21 it was revealed that Bonds would not return to the team following the 2007 season.

== Regular season ==
=== Season standings ===
==== National League West ====
NL West
Team	W	L	Pct.	GB	Home	Road
Arizona Diamondbacks	90	72	.556	—	50‍–‍31	40‍–‍41
Colorado Rockies	90	73	.552	½	51‍–‍31	39‍–‍42
San Diego Padres	89	74	.546	1½	47‍–‍34	42‍–‍40
Los Angeles Dodgers	82	80	.506	8	43‍–‍38	39‍–‍42
San Francisco Giants	71	91	.438	19	39‍–‍42	32‍–‍49

==== Record vs. opponents ====
2007 National League record Source: MLB Standings Grid – 2007
Team	AZ	ATL	CHC	CIN	COL	FLA	HOU	LAD	MIL	NYM	PHI	PIT	SD	SF	STL	WAS	AL
Arizona	—	4–2	4–2	2–4	8–10	6–1	5–2	8–10	2–5	3–4	5–1	5–4	10–8	10–8	4–3	6–1	8–7
Atlanta	2–4	—	5–4	1–6	4–2	10–8	3–3	4–3	5–2	9–9	9–9	5–1	5–2	4–3	3–4	11–7	4–11
Chicago	2–4	4–5	—	9–9	5–2	0–6	8–7	2–5	9–6	2–5	3–4	8–7	3–5	5–2	11–5	6–1	8–4
Cincinnati	4–2	6–1	9–9	—	2–4	4–3	4–11	2–4	8–7	2–5	2–4	9–7	2–4	4–3	6–9	1–6	7-11
Colorado	10–8	2–4	2–5	4–2	—	3–3	3–4	12–6	4–2	4–2	4–3	4–3	11–8	10–8	3–4	4–3	10–8
Florida	1–6	8–10	6–0	3–4	3–3	—	2–3	4–3	2–5	7–11	9–9	3–4	3–4	1–6	2–4	8–10	9–9
Houston	2–5	3–3	7–8	11–4	4–3	3-2	—	4–3	5–13	2–5	3–3	5–10	4–3	2–4	7–9	2–5	9–9
Los Angeles	10–8	3–4	5–2	4–2	6–12	3–4	3–4	—	3–3	5–5	4–2	5–2	8–10	10–8	3–3	5–1	5–10
Milwaukee	5–2	2–5	6–9	7–8	2–4	5–2	13–5	3–3	—	2–4	3–4	10–6	2–5	4–5	7–8	4–2	8–7
New York	4–3	9–9	5–2	5–2	2–4	11–7	5–2	5–5	4–2	—	6–12	4–2	2–4	4–2	5–2	9–9	8–7
Philadelphia	1-5	9–9	4–3	4–2	3–4	9–9	3–3	2–4	4–3	12–6	—	4–2	4–3	4–4	6–3	12–6	8–7
Pittsburgh	4–5	1–5	7–8	7–9	3–4	4–3	10–5	2–5	6–10	2–4	2–4	—	1–6	4–2	6–12	4–2	5–10
San Diego	8–10	2–5	5–3	4–2	8–11	4–3	3–4	10–8	5–2	4–2	3–4	6–1	—	14–4	3–4	4–2	6–9
San Francisco	8–10	3–4	2–5	3–4	8–10	6–1	4–2	8–10	5–4	2–4	4–4	2–4	4–14	—	4–1	3–4	5–10
St. Louis	3–4	4–3	5–11	9–6	4–3	4-2	9–7	3–3	8–7	2–5	3–6	12–6	4–3	1–4	—	1–5	6–9
Washington	1–6	7–11	1–6	6–1	3–4	10-8	5–2	1–5	2–4	9–9	6–12	2–4	2–4	4–3	5–1	—	9–9

=== Game log ===
2007 game log
April

#	Date	Opponent	Score	Win	Loss	Save	Attendance	Record
1	April 3	Padres	7–0	Peavy (1-0)	Zito (0-1)		42,773	0-1
2	April 4	Padres	5–3	Meredith (1-0)	Hennessey (0-1)	Hoffman (1)	39,938	0-2
3	April 5	Padres	5–3	Morris (1-0)	Hensley (0-1)	Benítez (1)	37,914	1-2
4	April 6	Dodgers	2–1	Penny (1-0)	Lowry (0-1)	Saito (2)	43,146	1-3
5	April 7	Dodgers	4–1	Lowe (1-1)	Ortiz (0-1)	Saito (3)	42,098	1-4
6	April 8	Dodgers	10–4	Wolf (1-1)	Zito (0-2)		39,343	1-5
7	April 9	@ Padres	1–0	Young (1-0)	Cain (0-1)	Hoffman (2)	31,388	1-6
8	April 10	@ Padres	6–5	Morris (2-0)	Hensley (0-2)	Benítez (2)	28,878	2-6
9	April 11	@ Padres	4–0	Maddux (1-1)	Lowry (0-2)		31,568	2-7
10	April 13	@ Pirates	8–5	Ortiz (1-1)	Duke (1-1)		22,117	3-7
--	April 14	@ Pirates	Postponed (rain) Rescheduled for August 13					3-7
--	April 15	@ Pirates	Postponed (rain) Rescheduled for August 13					3-7
11	April 16	@ Rockies	8–0	Zito (1-2)	Francis (1-1)		18,222	4-7
12	April 17	@ Rockies	5–3	Ramírez (1-0)	Correia (0-1)	Fuentes (3)	18,207	4-8
13	April 18	Cardinals	6–5 (12)	Sánchez (1-0)	Hancock (0-1)		40,532	5-8
14	April 19	Cardinals	6–2	Lowry (1-2)	Wells (1-3)	Hennessey (1)	37,398	6-8
15	April 20	D-backs	4–2	Ortiz (2-1)	Davis (1-2)	Benítez (3)	39,010	7-8
16	April 21	D-backs	1–0	Zito (2-2)	González (1-2)	Benítez (4)	36,281	8-8
17	April 22	D-backs	2–1	Cain (1-1)	Petit (0-1)		36,868	9-8
18	April 24	@ Dodgers	5–3	Morris (3-0)	Lowe (2-3)	Benítez (5)	44,001	10-8
19	April 25	@ Dodgers	6–4	Lowry (2-2)	Wolf (3-2)	Benítez (6)	43,963	11-8
20	April 26	@ Dodgers	5–4	Correia (1-1)	Beimel (1-1)	Benítez (7)	56,000	12-8
21	April 27	@ D-backs	3–2	Davis (2-2)	Zito (2-3)	Valverde (9)	24,798	12-9
22	April 28	@ D-backs	5–4	Nippert (1-0)	Chulk (0-1)	Valverde (10)	32,147	12-10
23	April 29	@ D-backs	5–4	Medders (1-0)	Morris (3-1)	Lyon (1)	28,818	12-11
24	April 30	Rockies	9–5	Lowry (3-2)	Fogg (1-2)		34,689	13-11

May

#	Date	Opponent	Score	Win	Loss	Save	Attendance	Record
25	May 1	Rockies	9–7	Árias (1-0)	Ortiz (2-2)	Fuentes (5)	33,210	13-12
26	May 2	Rockies	5–3	Hennessey (1-1)	Francis (1-4)		32,557	14-12
27	May 3	Phillies	9–7	Eaton (3-2)	Cain (1-2)	Myers (1)	33,466	14-13
28	May 4	Phillies	6–2	Morris (4-1)	Moyer (3-2)		39,265	15-13
29	May 5	Phillies	9–4	Lowry (4-2)	Lieber (1-1)		40,796	16-13
30	May 6	Phillies	8–5	Hamels (4-1)	Chulk (0-2)	Myers (2)	38,738	16-14
31	May 7	Mets	9–4	Zito (3-3)	Pérez (3-3)		37,365	17-14
32	May 8	Mets	4–1	Glavine (4-1)	Cain (1-3)	Wagner (7)	39,455	17-15
33	May 9	Mets	5–3	Heilman (3-2)	Benítez (0-1)	Wagner (8)	41,832	17-16
34	May 10	@ Rockies	5–3	Cook (2-1)	Lowry (4-3)	Fuentes (9)	20,120	17-17
35	May 11	@ Rockies	8–3	Lincecum (1-0)	Fogg (1-4)		26,162	18-17
36	May 12	@ Rockies	6–2	Francis (2-4)	Zito (3-4)		33,569	18-18
37	May 13	@ Rockies	15–2	Cain (2-3)	Buchholz (1-2)		24,243	19-18
38	May 15	@ Astros	6–5 (10)	Qualls (4-1)	Sánchez (1-1)		33,490	19-19
39	May 16	@ Astros	2–1	Sampson (4-3)	Lowry (4-4)	Wheeler (9)	33,533	19-20
40	May 17	@ Astros	2–1 (12)	Chulk (1-2)	Lidge (1-2)	Benítez (8)	36,815	20-20
41	May 18	@ Athletics	15–3	Gaudin (3-1)	Zito (3-5)		35,077	20-21
42	May 19	@ Athletics	4–2	Haren (4-2)	Cain (2-4)	Embree (1)	35,077	20-22
43	May 20	@ Athletics	4–1	Morris (5-1)	Kennedy (1-3)		35,077	21-22
44	May 21	Astros	4–0	Lowry (5-4)	Sampson (4-4)		35,768	22-22
45	May 22	Astros	4–2	Lincecum (2-0)	Oswalt (6-3)	Benítez (9)	35,134	23-22
46	May 23	Astros	9–1	Zito (4-5)	Albers (1-4)		35,521	24-22
47	May 25	Rockies	5–3	Affeldt (2-1)	Benítez (0-2)	Fuentes (14)	41,274	24-23
48	May 26	Rockies	6–1	Cook (4-1)	Morris (5-2)		38,212	24-24
49	May 27	Rockies	6–4 (10)	Ramírez (2-1)	Kline (0-1)	Fuentes (15)	41,708	24-25
50	May 29	@ Mets	5–4 (12)	Smith (2-0)	Benítez (0-3)		47,940	24-26
51	May 30	@ Mets	3–0	Zito (5-5)	Glavine (5-3)	Hennessey (2)	41,395	25-26
52	May 31	@ Mets	4–2	Hernández (3-1)	Cain (2-5)	Wagner (13)	44,228	25-27

June

#	Date	Opponent	Score	Win	Loss	Save	Attendance	Record
53	June 1	@ Phillies	13–0	Morris (6-2)	Eaton (5-4)		38,164	26-27
54	June 2	@ Phillies	5–2	Hamels (8-2)	Lowry (5-5)		45,153	26-28
55	June 3	@ Phillies	9–8	Alfonseca (3-1)	Correia (1-2)		39,293	26-29
56	June 4	@ Phillies	8–1	Zito (6-5)	Lieber (2-4)		33,967	27-29
57	June 5	@ D-backs	4–3 (10)	Lyon (4-2)	Correia (1-3)		25,848	27-30
58	June 6	@ D-backs	1–0	Webb (6-3)	Morris (6-3)	Valverde (21)	24,398	27-31
59	June 7	@ D-backs	5–4 (11)	Taschner (1-0)	Medders (1-2)	Kline (1)	21,984	28-31
60	June 8	Athletics	5–3 (10)	Calero (1-4)	Hennessey (1-2)	Embree (6)	42,427	28-32
61	June 9	Athletics	6–0	Haren (7-2)	Zito (6-6)		42,526	28-33
62	June 10	Athletics	2–0	Casilla (2-0)	Cain (2-6)		42,345	28-34
63	June 11	Blue Jays	4–3	Morris (7-3)	Towers (2-4)		38,030	29-34
64	June 12	Blue Jays	3–2	Lowry (6-5)	Burnett (5-6)	Hennessey (3)	37,574	30-34
65	June 13	Blue Jays	7–4	McGowan (3-2)	Lincecum (2-1)	Accardo (7)	40,086	30-35
66	June 15	@ Red Sox	10–2	Tavárez (4-4)	Zito (6-7)		36,508	30-36
67	June 16	@ Red Sox	1–0	Matsuzaka (8-5)	Cain (2-7)	Papelbon (16)	36,381	30-37
68	June 17	@ Red Sox	9–5	Wakefield (7-7)	Morris (7-4)		36,137	30-38
69	June 18	@ Brewers	5–4	Gallardo (1-0)	Lowry (6-6)		41,631	30-39
70	June 19	@ Brewers	6–2	Sheets (8-3)	Lincecum (2-2)		35,238	30-40
71	June 20	@ Brewers	7–5	Vargas (6-1)	Zito (6-8)	Cordero (27)	35,151	30-41
72	June 22	Yankees	7–3	Vizcaíno (4-1)	Cain (2-8)	Rivera (9)	43,425	30-42
73	June 23	Yankees	6–5 (13)	Chulk (2-2)	Proctor (1-4)		43,485	31-42
74	June 24	Yankees	7–2	Lowry (7-6)	Mussina (3-5)		43,503	32-42
75	June 25	Padres	4–3 (11)	Chulk (3-2)	Hampson (2-2)		41,140	33-42
76	June 26	Padres	3–2 (10)	Meredith (3-5)	Messenger (0-1)	Hoffman (20)	41,329	33-43
77	June 27	Padres	4–2	Maddux (7-4)	Cain (2-9)	Hoffman (21)	42,527	33-44
78	June 29	D-backs	4–3 (10)	Peña (3-1)	Hennessey (1-3)	Valverde (26)	39,146	33-45
79	June 30	D-backs	4–1	Lowry (8-6)	Davis (5-9)	Hennessey (4)	41,515	34-45

July

#	Date	Opponent	Score	Win	Loss	Save	Attendance	Record
80	July 1	D-backs	13–0	Lincecum (3-2)	Owings (5-3)		42,154	35-45
81	July 3	@ Reds	7–3	Harang (9-2)	Correia (1-4)		37,299	35-46
82	July 4	@ Reds	9–5	Cain (3-9)	Belisle (5-6)		24,092	36-46
83	July 5	@ Reds	6–3	Arroyo (3-9)	Morris (7-5)	Weathers (16)	30,080	36-47
84	July 6	@ Cardinals	4–3	Lowry (9-6)	Maroth (5-3)	Messenger (1)	45,245	37-47
85	July 7	@ Cardinals	7–6	Lincecum (4-2)	Looper (6-7)	Hennessey (5)	45,355	38-47
86	July 8	@ Cardinals	7–0	Wellemeyer (3-2)	Zito (6-9)		44,613	38-48
87	July 13	Dodgers	9–1	Billingsley (6-0)	Cain (3-10)		43,230	38-49
88	July 14	Dodgers	8–7 (12)	Hendrickson (4-4)	Misch (0-1)	Seánez (1)	43,452	38-50
89	July 15	Dodgers	5–3	Tomko (2-7)	Lowry (9-7)	Saito (24)	43,446	38-51
90	July 16	@ Cubs	3–2	Hill (6-6)	Correia (1-5)	Howry (6)	40,282	38-52
91	July 17	@ Cubs	4–2	Zito (7-9)	Marmol (2-1)	Hennessey (6)	41,102	39-52
92	July 18	@ Cubs	12–1	Zambrano (12-7)	Cain (3-11)	Gallagher (1)	39,792	39-53
93	July 19	@ Cubs	9–8	Lilly (10-4)	Morris (7-6)	Howry (7)	40,198	39-54
94	July 20	@ Brewers	8–4	Lowry (10-7)	Villanueva (6-2)		43,121	40-54
95	July 21	@ Brewers	8–0	Lincecum (5-2)	Bush (8-8)		43,180	41-54
96	July 22	@ Brewers	7–5	Vargas (8-2)	Zito (7-10)	Cordero (31)	42,554	41-55
97	July 23	Braves	4–2	Smoltz (10-5)	Cain (3-12)	Wickman (17)	42,679	41-56
98	July 24	Braves	7–5 (13)	Moylan (4-1)	Sánchez (1-2)	Yates (2)	43,072	41-57
99	July 25	Braves	2–1	Lowry (11-7)	James (8-8)	Hennessey (7)	42,834	42-57
100	July 26	Braves	4–2	Lincecum (6-2)	Carlyle (5-3)	Hennessey (8)	42,366	43-57
101	July 27	Marlins	12–10	Chulk (4-2)	Pinto (2-4)		42,831	44-57
102	July 28	Marlins	4–3	Taschner (2-0)	Gregg (0-4)		43,001	45-57
103	July 29	Marlins	8–5	Mitre (5-5)	Morris (7-7)	Gregg (21)	42,965	45-58
104	July 31	@ Dodgers	3–1	Lowry (12-7)	Penny (13-2)	Hennessey (9)	56,000	46-58

August

#	Date	Opponent	Score	Win	Loss	Save	Attendance	Record
105	August 1	@ Dodgers	6–8	Broxton (4-2)	Messenger (1-3)	Saito (27)	56,000	46-59
106	August 2	@ Dodgers	4–2	Zito (8-10)	Tomko (2-9)	Kline (2)	56,000	47-59
107	August 3	@ Padres	3–4 (10)	Bell (5-3)	Taschner (2-1)		43,523	47-60
108	August 4	@ Padres	2–3 (12)	Meredith (4-5)	Messenger (1-4)		42,497	47-61
109	August 5	@ Padres	4–5	Brocail (4-1)	Chulk (4-3)	Hoffman (29)	42,438	47-62
110	August 6	Nationals	3–2 (11)	Hennessey (2-3)	King (1-1)		43,052	48-62
111	August 7	Nationals	6–8	Schroder (1-0)	Correia (1-6)	Cordero (24)	43,154	48-63
112	August 8	Nationals	5–0	Cain (4-12)	Redding (1-3)		42,991	49-63
113	August 9	Nationals	1–3	Hanrahan (2-0)	Misch (0-2)	Cordero (25)	41,555	49-64
114	August 10	Pirates	8–7	Grabow (2-1)	Chulk (4-4)	Capps (10)	41,923	49-65
115	August 11	Pirates	13–3	Armas (2-3)	Lincecum (6-3)		43,105	49-66
116	August 12	Pirates	5–0	Gorzelanny (11-6)	Zito (8-11)		41,976	49-67
117	August 13	@ Pirates	3–1	Maholm (8-14)	Cain (4-13)			49-68
118	August 13	@ Pirates	10–3	Lowry (13-7)	Youman (2-4)		25,434	50-68
119	August 14	@ Braves	5–4	Wickman (3-2)	Kline (0-2)		36,186	50-69
120	August 15	@ Braves	6–3	Hudson (14-5)	Ortiz (2-3)	Wickman (20)	33,841	50-70
121	August 16	@ Braves	9–3	Lincecum (7-3)	James (9-9)		36,419	51-70
122	August 17	@ Marlins	3–0	Zito (9-11)	Olsen (9-10)	Hennessey (10)	25,079	52-70
123	August 18	@ Marlins	4–3	Cain (5-13)	VandenHurk (3-4)	Hennessey (11)	42,817	53-70
124	August 19	@ Marlins	6–5	Chulk (5-4)	Gardner (3-4)	Hennessey (12)	15,351	54-70
125	August 20	@ Marlins	8–7	Taschner (3-1)	Wolf (0-1)	Wilson (1)	10,907	55-70
126	August 21	Cubs	5–1	Eyre (1-1)	Lincecum (7-4)		41,242	55-71
127	August 22	Cubs	4–2 (10)	Marmol (3-1)	Misch (0-3)	Dempster (20)	39,548	55-72
128	August 23	Cubs	4–1	Cain (6-13)	Zambrano (14-10)	Hennessey (13)	41,558	56-72
129	August 24	Brewers	11–6	Lowry (14-7)	Capuano (5-11)		37,583	57-72
130	August 25	Brewers	6–2	Correia (2-6)	Gallardo (5-4)	Wilson (2)	39,069	58-72
131	August 26	Brewers	5–4	Kline (1-2)	Linebrink (4-5)	Hennessey (14)	40,997	59-72
132	August 27	Rockies	4–1	Wilson (1-0)	Julio (0-5)	Hennessey (15)	35,726	60-72
133	August 28	Rockies	3–1	Cain (7-13)	Morales (0-2)	Hennessey (16)	37,844	61-72
134	August 29	Rockies	8–0	Francis (14-6)	Lowry (14-8)		38,397	61-73
135	August 31	@ Nationals	3–2	Correia (3-6)	Redding (3-5)	Hennessey (17)	25,169	62-73

September

#	Date	Opponent	Score	Win	Loss	Save	Attendance	Record
136	September 1	@ Nationals	4–1	Hanrahan (4-2)	Sánchez (1-3)	Cordero (29)	30,221	62-74
137	September 2	@ Nationals	2–1	Cordero (3-3)	Wilson (1-1)		27,310	62-75
138	September 3	@ Rockies	7–4	Francis (15-6)	Cain (7-14)	Corpas (13)	30,168	62-76
139	September 4	@ Rockies	6–5	Corpas (4-2)	Hennessey (2-4)		20,553	62-77
140	September 5	@ Rockies	5–3	Correia (4-6)	Jiménez (3-3)	Hennessey (18)	22,157	63-77
141	September 7	Dodgers	5–4	Hennessey (3-4)	Broxton (4-3)		40,016	64-77
142	September 8	Dodgers	6–2	Wells (7-8)	Zito (9-12)		42,228	64-78
143	September 9	Dodgers	4–2	Walker (1-0)	Beimel (4-2)	Hennessey (19)	40,650	65-78
144	September 10	D-backs	5–3	Peguero (1-0)	Hennessey (3-5)	Peña (2)	33,498	65-79
145	September 11	D-backs	2–1	Walker (2-0)	Wickman (3-4)	Wilson (3)	33,633	66-79
146	September 12	D-backs	9–4	Webb (16-10)	Sánchez (1-4)		37,083	66-80
147	September 14	@ Padres	5–4 (10)	Hoffman (4-4)	Giese (0-1)		32,053	66-81
148	September 15	@ Padres	6–0	Tomko (3-11)	Cain (7-15)		41,554	66-82
149	September 16	@ Padres	5–1	Peavy (18-6)	Lincecum (7-5)		34,000	66-83
150	September 17	@ D-backs	8–5	Munter (1-0)	Peña (5-4)	Wilson (4)	31,122	67-83
151	September 18	@ D-backs	5–0	Owings (7-8)	Sánchez (1-5)		44,220	67-84
152	September 19	@ D-backs	6–4	Cruz (6-1)	Zito (9-13)	Valverde (46)	42,855	67-85
153	September 20	Reds	4–2	Bailey (3-2)	Cain (7-16)	Weathers (32)	35,019	67-86
154	September 21	Reds	9–8 (11)	McBeth (3-2)	Munter (1-1)	Weathers (33)	35,502	67-87
155	September 22	Reds	2–0	Hennessey (4-5)	Bray (3-3)	Wilson (5)	36,375	68-87
156	September 23	Reds	5–4	Messenger (2-4)	Harang (16-5)	Wilson (6)	38,029	69-87
157	September 24	Padres	9–4	Zito (10-13)	Young (9-8)		35,650	70-87
158	September 25	Padres	6–4	Thatcher (1-1)	Wilson (1-2)	Hoffman (41)	35,524	70-88
159	September 26	Padres	11–3	Peavy (19-6)	Misch (0-4)		42,926	70-89
160	September 28	@ Dodgers	8–3	Wells (9-9)	Correia (4-7)		47,696	70-90
161	September 29	@ Dodgers	6–5 (10)	Saito (2-1)	Giese (0-2)		51,983	70-91
162	September 30	@ Dodgers	11–2	Zito (11-13)	Stults (1-4)		49,211	71-91

== Historic moments ==
2007 was a year that had various milestones, whether personal, or historical in terms of team history, or MLB history.

=== May ===
On May 7, 2007, Bengie Molina became the first Giant since Willie McCovey in 1977 to hit two home runs in one inning. Ray Durham led off the fifth inning with a walk, and Molina followed the walk with a two-run home run to left field. Rich Aurilia later hit a three-run homer, to make it a six-run inning. Barry Bonds, and Durham then walked, and Molina came up and hit a three-run home run to left-center field, to finish a nine-run inning.

Later in May, on Mother's day, the 13th, rookie Fred Lewis hit for the cycle, in his 16th Major League game, becoming only the 22nd Giant to do so. Lewis hit a double in the first inning, leading off the game, and hit his first major league home run, a three-run shot, in the third inning. His triple came in the fifth inning, and he got the last leg of the cycle in the seventh inning. Lewis was the first Giant to hit for the cycle since Randy Winn did it in Cincinnati on Aug 15, 2005. He is only the fourth player in Major League history to hit his first home run as part of a cycle, joining, Cliff Heathcote, Gary Ward, and Luke Scott. Heathcote accomplished this feat on June 13, 1918, Ward on September 18, 1980, and Scott on July 28, 2006. He also became the first left-handed San Francisco Giants batter to hit for the cycle.

=== June ===
Rookie Fred Lewis hit his first career grand slam against the Philadelphia Phillies on June 1, 2007.

=== July ===
On July 4, 2007, Fred Lewis hit his second grand slam of the season, becoming the first rookie in San Francisco Giants history to hit two slams in one season. Two of Lewis' first three career home runs were grand slams, and the other was part of a cycle.

=== August ===
On August 4, 2007, Barry Bonds tied Hank Aaron for the most home runs in Major League history, when he hit his 755th career home run off of the San Diego Padres' Clay Hensley.

Barry Bonds became the all-time home run leader at 8:51 pm PDT, on August 7, 2007, when he hit his 756th career home run off Mike Bascik and the Washington Nationals. His milestone home run was hit just to the right of center field at AT&T Park. A plaque commemorating his home run has since been placed on the wall near where his home run landed.

On August 8, Bonds added to his home run total, when he hit his 757th career homer into McCovey cove. He hit it off of the Washington Nationals' Tim Redding.

=== September ===
Barry Bonds hit his final home run of 2007 on September 5, bringing his career total to 762.

== Roster moves ==
=== April ===
The Giants made no notable roster moves during April.

=== May ===
May was a month full of injuries and roster-switches for the Giants. On May 3, starting pitcher Russ Ortiz suffered elbow neuritis and was placed on the 15-day disabled list. Second baseman Kevin Frandsen was recalled from the Giants' triple-A affiliate Fresno Grizzlies. The very next day, May 4, reliever Scott Munter was recalled from Fresno and first baseman Lance Niekro was designated for assignment. He cleared waivers and was sent down to Fresno on May 9.

On May 6, starter Tim Lincecum was recalled from Fresno and Scott Munter was sent down. On May 10, Dave Roberts was placed on the 15-day disabled list due to elbow surgery and Todd Linden was designated for assignment. Outfielders Dan Ortmeier and Fred Lewis were recalled from Fresno.

On May 21, Russ Ortiz came off the disabled list, forcing pitcher Jonathan Sánchez to be sent down to Fresno. To end the month, the team's closer Armando Benítez was traded to the Marlins for pitcher Randy Messenger.

=== June ===
Russ Ortiz was once again placed on the 15-day disabled list on June 7 because of a strained right forearm. J Jonathan Sánchez was recalled, once again. On June 9, catcher Eliézer Alfonzo was placed on the 15-day disabled list and Guillermo Rodríguez was recalled from Fresno. Later that same day, outfielder Fred Lewis was placed on the 15-day disabled list because of a right oblique strain. Outfielder Dave Roberts was recalled in his place.

=== July ===
On July 31, 2007, pitcher Matt Morris was traded to the Pittsburgh Pirates for center field prospect Rajai Davis and pitcher Stephen MacFarland.

=== Roster ===
2007 San Francisco Giants
Roster
Pitchers: 52 Scott Atchison; 49 Armando Benítez; 29 Travis Blackley; 18 Matt Cain; 31 Vinnie Chulk; 32 Kevin Correia; 56 Dan Giese; 41 Brad Hennessey; 34 Steve Kline; 55 Tim Lincecum; 51 Noah Lowry; 23 Randy Messenger; 71 Patrick Misch; 22 Matt Morris; 54 Scott Munter; 48 Russ Ortiz; 53 Jonathan Sánchez; 37 Jack Taschner; 60 Erick Threets; 45 Tyler Walker; 38 Brian Wilson; 75 Barry Zito	Catchers: 50 Eliézer Alfonzo; 1 Bengie Molina; 39 Guillermo Rodríguez; Infielders: 35 Rich Aurilia; 5 Ray Durham; 7 Pedro Feliz; 29 Luis Figueroa; 19 Kevin Frandsen; 8 Scott McClain; 21 Ryan Klesko; 28 Lance Niekro; 9 Mark Sweeney; 57 Eugenio Vélez; 13 Omar Vizquel	Outfielders: 25,42 Barry Bonds; 28 Rajai Davis; 14 Fred Lewis; 39 Todd Linden; 40 Daniel Ortmeier; 10 Dave Roberts; 12 Nate Schierholtz; 2 Randy Winn	Manager: 15 Bruce Bochy; Coaches: 6 Tim Flannery (third base); 26 Mark Gardner (bullpen); 16 Joe Lefebvre (hitting); 46 Dave Righetti (pitching); 20 Willie Upshaw (first base); 17 Ron Wotus (bench)

== Player stats ==
=== Batting ===
==== Starters by position ====
Note: Pos = Position; G = Games played; AB = At bats; H = Hits; Avg. = Batting average; HR = Home runs; RBI = Runs batted in

Pos	Player	G	AB	H	Avg.	HR	RBI
C	Bengie Molina	134	497	137	.276	19	81
1B	Ryan Klesko	116	362	94	.260	6	44
2B	Ray Durham	138	464	101	.218	11	71
SS	Omar Vizquel	145	513	126	.246	4	51
3B	Pedro Feliz	150	557	141	.253	20	72
LF	Barry Bonds	126	340	94	.276	28	66
CF	Dave Roberts	114	396	103	.260	2	23
RF	Randy Winn	155	593	178	.300	14	65

==== Other batters ====
Note: G = Games played; AB = At bats; H = Hits; Avg. = Batting average; HR = Home runs; RBI = Runs batted in

Player	G	AB	H	Avg.	HR	RBI
Rich Aurilia	99	329	83	.252	5	33
Kevin Frandsen	109	264	71	.269	5	31
Fred Lewis	58	157	45	.287	3	19
Daniel Ortmeier	62	157	45	.287	6	16
Rajai Davis	51	142	40	.282	1	7
Nate Schierholtz	39	112	34	.304	0	10
Mark Sweeney	76	90	23	.256	2	10
Guillermo Rodríguez	39	87	22	.253	1	14
Eliézer Alfonzo	26	64	16	.250	1	6
Todd Linden	30	55	10	.182	0	3
Lance Niekro	11	17	3	.176	0	0
Eugenio Vélez	14	11	3	.273	0	2
Scott McClain	8	11	2	.182	0	0
Luis Figueroa	6	5	1	.200	0	0

=== Pitching ===
==== Starting pitchers ====
Note: G = Games pitched; IP = Innings pitched; W = Wins; L = Losses; ERA = Earned run average; SO = Strikeouts

Player	G	IP	W	L	ERA	SO
Matt Cain	32	200.0	7	16	3.65	163
Barry Zito	34	196.2	11	13	4.53	131
Noah Lowry	26	156.0	14	8	3.92	87
Tim Lincecum	24	146.1	7	5	4.00	150
Matt Morris	21	136.2	7	7	4.35	73
Travis Blackley	2	8.2	0	0	7.27	5

==== Other pitchers ====
Note: G = Games pitched; IP = Innings pitched; W = Wins; L = Losses; ERA = Earned run average; SO = Strikeouts

Player	G	IP	W	L	ERA	SO
Russ Ortiz	12	49.0	2	3	5.51	27
Pat Misch	18	40.1	0	4	4.24	26

==== Relief pitchers ====
Note: G = Games pitched; W = Wins; L = Losses; SV = Saves; ERA = Earned run average; SO = Strikeouts

Player	G	W	L	SV	ERA	SO
Brad Hennessey	69	4	5	19	3.42	40
Steve Kline	68	1	2	2	4.70	17
Jack Taschner	63	3	1	0	5.40	51
Kevin Correia	59	4	7	0	3.45	80
Vinnie Chulk	57	5	4	0	3.57	41
Randy Messenger	37	1	3	1	5.09	22
Jonathan Sánchez	33	1	5	0	5.88	62
Brian Wilson	24	1	2	6	2.28	18
Scott Atchison	22	0	0	0	4.11	25
Armando Benítez	19	0	3	9	4.67	18
Tyler Walker	15	2	0	0	1.26	9
Scott Munter	12	1	1	0	4.22	4
Dan Giese	8	0	2	0	4.82	7
Erick Threets	3	0	0	0	19.29	1

== Awards and honors ==
- Bengie Molina C, Willie Mac Award

== All Star Game ==
All-Star Game

- Barry Bonds, Outfield, Starter (14th career All-Star appearance)

== Farm system ==
Level	Team	League	Manager
AAA	Fresno Grizzlies	Pacific Coast League	Dan Rohn
AA	Connecticut Defenders	Eastern League	Dave Machemer and Shane Turner
A	San Jose Giants	California League	Lenn Sakata
A	Augusta GreenJackets	South Atlantic League	Roberto Kelly
A-Short Season	Salem-Keizer Volcanoes	Northwest League	Steve Decker
Rookie	AZL Giants	Arizona League	Bert Hunter

LEAGUE CHAMPIONS: San Jose, Salem-Keizer
