= 2006 San Francisco Giants season =

2006 San Francisco Giants
- League: National League
- Division: West
- Ballpark: AT&T Park
- City: San Francisco, California
- Record: 76–85 (.472)
- Divisional place: 3rd
- Owners: Peter Magowan
- General managers: Brian Sabean
- Managers: Felipe Alou
- Television: KTVU (Jon Miller, Greg Papa, Mike Krukow); FSN Bay Area (Mike Krukow, Duane Kuiper)
- Radio: KNBR (Greg Papa, Dave Flemming, Jon Miller, Duane Kuiper, Mike Krukow); KLOK (Tito Fuentes, Erwin Higueros, Amaury Pi-Gonzalez)

The 2006 San Francisco Giants season was the Giants' 124th year in Major League Baseball, their 49th year in San Francisco since their move from New York following the 1957 season, and their sixth at AT&T Park. The team finished in third place in the National League West with a 76–85 record, 11½ games behind the San Diego Padres.

== Regular season ==
=== Season summary ===
Barry Bonds of the Giants pursued his quest toward Hank Aaron's all-time mark of 755 home runs. Bonds finished the season with 734 career home runs, 21 short of tying Aaron's mark. On June 3, 2006, Eliezer Alfonzo made his big league debut. In his debut, his name was misspelled on his jersey (it should have ended in "zo", not "so"). Alfonzo hit a two-run shot in the sixth inning that ultimately won the game against the Mets. The following day, the jersey was still misspelled. The Giants finished 76-85, 11½ games behind the division winner, the San Diego Padres, and also 11½ games behind the Los Angeles Dodgers. The Giants finished in third place in their division, just ½ game ahead of both the Arizona Diamondbacks and Colorado Rockies, who both finished their season with a record of 76-86.

=== Season standings ===
==== National League West ====
NL West
Team	W	L	Pct.	GB	Home	Road
San Diego Padres	88	74	.543	—	43‍–‍38	45‍–‍36
Los Angeles Dodgers	88	74	.543	—	49‍–‍32	39‍–‍42
San Francisco Giants	76	85	.472	11½	43‍–‍38	33‍–‍47
Arizona Diamondbacks	76	86	.469	12	39‍–‍42	37‍–‍44
Colorado Rockies	76	86	.469	12	44‍–‍37	32‍–‍49

==== Record vs. opponents ====
2006 National League record Source: MLB Standings Grid – 2006
Team	AZ	ATL	CHC	CIN	COL	FLA	HOU	LAD	MIL	NYM	PHI	PIT	SD	SF	STL	WAS	AL
Arizona	—	6–1	4–2	4–2	12–7	2–4	4–5	8–10	3–3	1–6	1–5	5–1	9–10	8–11	4–3	1–5	4–11
Atlanta	1–6	—	6–1	4–3	3–3	11–8	3–4	3–3	2–4	7–11	7–11	3–3	7–2	3–4	4–2	10–8	5–10
Chicago	2–4	1–6	—	10–9	2–4	2–4	7–8	4–2	8–8	3–3	2–5	6–9	0–7	2–4	11–8	2–4	4–11
Cincinnati	2–4	3–4	9–10	—	5–1	4–2	10–5	0–6	9–10	3–4	2–4	9–7	2–4	2–5	9–6	5–1	6-9
Colorado	7–12	3–3	4–2	1–5	—	3–3	4–2	4–15	2–4	1–5	3–4	3–3	10–9	10–8	2–7	8–0	11–4
Florida	4–2	8–11	4–2	2–4	3–3	—	3–4	1–5	7–0	8–11	6–13	5–2	3–3	3–3	1–5	11–7	9–9
Houston	5–4	4–3	8–7	5–10	2–4	4-3	—	3–3	10–5	2–4	2–4	13–3	3–3	1–5	9–7	4–4	7–11
Los Angeles	10–8	3–3	2–4	6–0	15–4	5–1	3–3	—	4–2	3–4	4–3	6–4	5–13	13–6	0–7	4–2	5–10
Milwaukee	3–3	4–2	8–8	10–9	4–2	0–7	5–10	2–4	—	3–3	5–1	7–9	4–3	6–3	7–9	1–5	6–9
New York	6–1	11–7	3–3	4–3	5–1	11–8	4–2	4–3	3–3	—	11–8	5–4	5–2	3–3	4–2	12–6	6–9
Philadelphia	5-1	11–7	5–2	4–2	4–3	13–6	4–2	3–4	1–5	8–11	—	3–3	2–4	5–1	3–3	9–10	5–13
Pittsburgh	1–5	3–3	9–6	7–9	3–3	2–5	3–13	4–6	9–7	4–5	3–3	—	1–5	6–1	6–9	3–3	3–12
San Diego	10–9	2–7	7–0	4–2	9–10	3–3	3–3	13–5	3–4	2–5	4–2	5–1	—	7–12	4–2	5–1	7–8
San Francisco	11–8	4–3	4–2	5–2	8–10	3–3	5–1	6–13	3–6	3–3	1–5	1–6	12–7	—	1–4	1–5	8–7
St. Louis	3–4	2–4	8–11	6–9	7–2	5-1	7–9	7–0	9–7	2–4	3–3	9–6	2–4	4–1	—	4–3	5–10
Washington	5–1	8–10	4–2	1–5	0–8	7-11	4–4	2–4	5–1	6–12	10–9	3–3	1–5	5–1	3–4	—	7–11

=== Notable transactions ===
- December 8, 2005: Mark Sweeney was signed as a free agent with the San Francisco Giants.
- June 6, 2006: Tim Lincecum was drafted by the San Francisco Giants in the 1st round (10th pick) of the 2006 amateur draft. Player signed June 30, 2006.
- July 22, 2006: Jeremy Accardo was traded to the Toronto Blue Jays for third baseman Shea Hillenbrand and relief pitcher Vinnie Chulk.
- July 28, 2006: Mike Stanton was traded by the Washington Nationals to the San Francisco Giants for Shairon Martis (minors).

=== Roster ===
2006 San Francisco Giants
Roster
Pitchers: 59 Jeremy Accardo; 49 Armando Benítez; 43 Matt Cain; 31 Vinnie Chulk; 53,32 Kevin Correia; 14 Jeff Fassero; 41 Brad Hennessey; 34 Steve Kline; 51 Noah Lowry; 71 Patrick Misch; 35 Matt Morris; 54 Scott Munter; 59 Billy Sadler; 53 Jonathan Sánchez; 29 Jason Schmidt; 38 Mike Stanton; 37 Jack Taschner; 47 Tyler Walker; 33 Brian Wilson; 45 Tim Worrell; 48 Jamey Wright	Catchers: 50 Eliézer Alfonzo; 20 Todd Greene; 60 Justin Knoedler; 22 Mike Matheny; Infielders: 10 Tomás de la Rosa; 5 Ray Durham; 7 Pedro Feliz; 8,19 Kevin Frandsen; 8 Shea Hillenbrand; 1 Travis Ishikawa; 28 Lance Niekro; 14 Chad Santos; 9 Mark Sweeney; 10 José Vizcaíno; 13 Omar Vizquel	Outfielders: 18 Moisés Alou; 25 Barry Bonds; 21 Jason Ellison; 12 Steve Finley; 14 Fred Lewis; 39 Todd Linden; 40 Daniel Ortmeier; 2 Randy Winn	Manager: 23 Felipe Alou; Coaches: 26 Mark Gardner (bullpen); 15 Gene Glynn (third base); 16 Joe Lefebvre (hitting); 55 Luis Pujols (first base); 19,46 Dave Righetti (pitching); 10 Ron Wotus (bench)

== Player stats ==
=== Batting ===
Note: G = Games played; AB = At bats; R = Runs; H = Hits; 2B = Doubles; 3B = Triples; HR = Home runs; RBI = Runs batted in; SB = Stolen bases; BB = Walks; AVG = Batting average; SLG = Slugging average

Player	G	AB	R	H	2B	3B	HR	RBI	SB	BB	AVG	SLG
Pedro Feliz	160	603	75	147	35	5	22	98	1	33	.244	.428
Omar Vizquel	153	579	88	171	22	10	4	58	24	56	.295	.389
Randy Winn	149	573	82	150	34	5	11	56	10	48	.262	.396
Ray Durham	137	498	79	146	30	7	26	93	7	51	.293	.538
Steve Finley	139	426	66	105	21	12	6	40	7	46	.246	.394
Barry Bonds	130	367	74	99	23	0	26	77	3	115	.270	.545
Moisés Alou	98	345	52	104	25	1	22	74	2	28	.301	.571
Eliézer Alfonzo	87	286	27	76	17	2	12	39	1	9	.266	.465
Mark Sweeney	114	259	32	65	15	2	5	37	0	28	.251	.382
Shea Hillenbrand	60	234	33	58	12	0	9	29	0	7	.248	.415
Lance Niekro	66	199	27	49	9	2	5	31	0	11	.246	.387
Mike Matheny	47	160	10	37	8	0	3	18	0	9	.231	.338
Todd Greene	61	159	16	46	12	2	2	17	0	10	.289	.428
José Vizcaíno	64	119	16	25	3	0	1	5	0	16	.210	.261
Kevin Frandsen	41	93	12	20	4	0	2	7	0	3	.215	.323
Jason Ellison	84	81	14	18	5	1	2	4	2	5	.222	.383
Todd Linden	61	77	15	21	4	2	2	5	1	9	.273	.455
Travis Ishikawa	12	24	1	7	3	1	0	4	0	1	.292	.500
Tomás de la Rosa	16	16	1	5	0	0	0	1	0	1	.313	.313
Daniel Ortmeier	9	12	0	3	1	0	0	2	0	0	.250	.333
Fred Lewis	13	11	5	5	1	0	0	2	0	0	.455	.545
Chad Santos	3	7	2	3	0	0	1	2	0	1	.429	.857
Justin Knoedler	5	7	0	1	0	0	0	0	0	0	.143	.143
Pitcher totals	161	337	19	57	13	0	2	12	0	7	.169	.226
Team totals	161	5472	746	1418	297	52	163	711	58	494	.259	.422

=== Pitching ===
Note: W = Wins; L = Losses; ERA = Earned run average; G = Games pitched; GS = Games started; SV = Saves; IP = Innings pitched; H = Hits allowed; R = Runs allowed; ER = Earned runs allowed; BB = Walks allowed; SO = Strikeouts

Player	W	L	ERA	G	GS	SV	IP	H	R	ER	BB	SO
Jason Schmidt	11	9	3.59	32	32	0	213.1	189	94	85	80	180
Matt Morris	10	15	4.98	33	33	0	207.2	218	123	115	63	117
Matt Cain	13	12	4.15	32	31	0	190.2	157	93	88	87	179
Noah Lowry	7	10	4.74	27	27	0	159.1	166	89	84	56	84
Jamey Wright	6	10	5.19	34	21	0	156.0	167	95	90	64	79
Brad Hennessey	5	6	4.26	34	12	1	99.1	92	53	47	42	42
Kevin Correia	2	0	3.49	48	0	0	69.2	64	27	27	22	57
Steve Kline	4	3	3.66	72	0	1	51.2	53	24	21	26	33
Jeremy Accardo	1	3	4.91	38	0	3	40.1	38	23	22	11	40
Jonathan Sánchez	3	1	4.95	27	4	0	40.0	39	26	22	23	33
Armando Benítez	4	2	3.52	41	0	17	38.1	39	15	15	21	31
Brian Wilson	2	3	5.40	31	0	1	30.0	32	19	18	21	23
Mike Stanton	4	2	3.09	26	0	8	23.1	23	8	8	6	18
Scott Munter	0	1	8.74	27	0	0	22.2	30	22	22	18	7
Vinnie Chulk	0	3	5.24	28	0	0	22.1	17	13	13	15	25
Tim Worrell	3	2	7.52	23	0	6	20.1	28	18	17	7	12
Jack Taschner	0	1	8.38	24	0	0	19.1	31	23	18	7	15
Jeff Fassero	1	1	7.80	10	1	0	15.0	23	13	13	8	7
Tyler Walker	0	1	15.19	6	0	0	5.1	9	9	9	5	3
Billy Sadler	0	0	6.75	5	0	0	4.0	5	3	3	2	6
Pat Misch	0	0	0.00	1	0	0	1.0	2	0	0	0	1
Team totals	76	85	4.63	161	161	37	1429.2	1422	790	735	584	992

== Awards and honors ==
- Omar Vizquel SS, Willie Mac Award

All-Star Game

- Jason Schmidt P

== Farm system ==
Level	Team	League	Manager
AAA	Fresno Grizzlies	Pacific Coast League	Shane Turner
AA	Connecticut Defenders	Eastern League	Dave Machemer
A	San Jose Giants	California League	Lenn Sakata
A	Augusta GreenJackets	South Atlantic League	Roberto Kelly
A-Short Season	Salem-Keizer Volcanoes	Northwest League	Steve Decker
Rookie	AZL Giants	Arizona League	Bert Hunter

LEAGUE CHAMPIONS: Salem-Keizer
