= 1997 Eastern League season =

The 1997 Eastern League season began on approximately April 1 and the regular season ended on approximately September 1.

The Harrisburg Senators defeated the Portland Sea Dogs 3 games to 1 to win the Eastern League Championship Series.

== Regular season ==
=== Standings ===
Eastern League - Northern Division
Team	Win	Loss	%	GB
**Portland Sea Dogs**	79	63	.556	–
Norwich Navigators	73	69	.514	6.0
New Britain Rock Cats	70	72	.493	9.0
Binghamton Mets	66	76	.465	13.0
New Haven Ravens	64	78	.451	15.0

Eastern League - Southern Division
Team	Win	Loss	%	GB
**Harrisburg Senators**	86	56	.606	–
Bowie Baysox	75	67	.528	11.0
Reading Phillies	74	68	.521	12.0
Trenton Thunder	71	70	.504	14.5
Akron Aeros	51	90	.362	34.5

Notes:

Green shade indicates that team advanced to the playoffs
Bold indicates that team advanced to ELCS
Italics indicates that team won ELCS

== Playoffs ==
=== Divisional Series ===
==== Northern Division ====
The Portland Sea Dogs defeated the Norwich Navigators in the Northern Division playoffs 3 games to 2.

==== Southern Division ====
The Harrisburg Senators defeated the Bowie Baysox in the Southern Division playoffs 3 games to 2.

=== Championship series ===
The Harrisburg Senators defeated the Portland Sea Dogs in the ELCS 3 games to 1.
