= Pedro Feliz =

Dominican baseball player (born 1975)

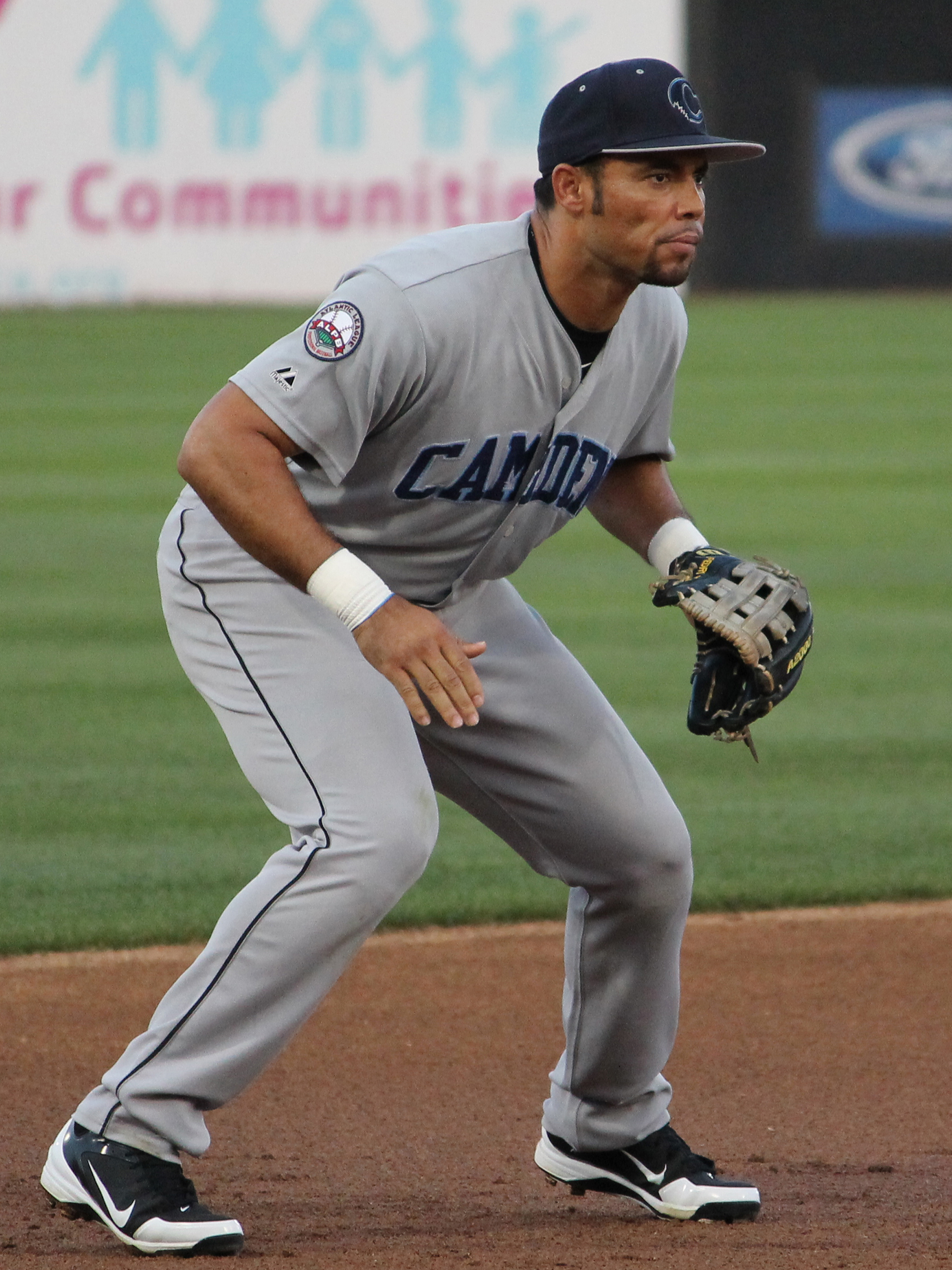
- Feliz with the Camden Riversharks
- Third baseman
- Born: April 27, 1975 (age 51); Ázua de Compostela, Dominican Republic
- Batted: Right Threw: Right

MLB debut
- September 5, 2000, for the San Francisco Giants

Last MLB appearance
- October 3, 2010, for the St. Louis Cardinals

MLB statistics
- Batting average: .250
- Home runs: 140
- Runs batted in: 598
- Stats at Baseball Reference

Teams
- San Francisco Giants (2000–2007); Philadelphia Phillies (2008–2009); Houston Astros (2010); St. Louis Cardinals (2010)

Career highlights and awards
- World Series champion (2008)
Medals
Men's baseball
Representing Dominican Republic
Central American and Caribbean Games
| Bronze medal – third place | 2014 Veracruz | Team |

Pedro Julio Feliz (born April 27, 1975) is a Dominican former professional baseball third baseman, who played in Major League Baseball (MLB) for the San Francisco Giants, Philadelphia Phillies, Houston Astros, and St. Louis Cardinals.

Feliz hit 20 or more home runs in four of his first five seasons as a starting third baseman and was an above-average fielder at that position. He spent the first eight years of his MLB career with the San Francisco Giants (2000–2007), before signing a free agent contract with the Philadelphia Phillies, in 2008.

== Baseball career ==
=== Minor leagues ===
Feliz was signed by the San Francisco Giants, as an amateur free agent, on February 7, 1994. He spent parts of seven seasons in the Giants' farm system before being called up to the Giants when the rosters expanded, in September 2000.

=== San Francisco Giants ===
Feliz played for the Giants from 2000 to 2007 and was their only homegrown position player, from 2002 through 2007. After a few seasons coming off the bench and starting occasionally, a number of Giants players sustained injuries, allowing him to become a regular player, in 2004. Feliz filled in for regular Edgardo Alfonzo for 51 games at third base, spelled J. T. Snow for 70 games at first base, appeared in 20 games at shortstop, and played four games in the outfield. With the bat, Feliz posted career highs in batting average (BA) (.276), HR (22), runs batted in (RBI) (84), at-bats (AB) (603), and games played (G) (144), that season.

Feliz had moved around defensively throughout his early big league career, especially during the Giants' injury-riddled 2005 season. By 2007, he had settled into the role of the Giants' starting third baseman.

Although Feliz was a decent power hitter, his career batting average prior to the 2006 season was only .255, and he seldom walked, as evidenced by his on-base percentage (OBP) never surpassing the .305 mark, and his OPS never exceeding .793. He has often been criticized for his lack of patience at the plate. In 2006, Feliz struck out a career-high 112 times.

On June 8, 2007, in a game against the Oakland Athletics, Feliz played catcher for the first time in his major league career. During that game, the Giants' starting catcher Bengie Molina was lifted from the game, as part of a double switch. Their backup catcher, Eliézer Alfonzo, was injured on a play at the plate and had to leave the game, in the 10th inning. With the Giants out of position players, Feliz moved to catcher, Randy Winn moved from center field to third, Dan Ortmeier moved from right field to center, and pitcher Noah Lowry came into the game in right. After the season, Feliz was honored with a Fielding Bible Award as the best fielding third baseman in MLB in 2007.

Following the 2007 season, Felix sought a 3-year contract extension from the Giants, as his previous contract had come to a conclusion; however, the team declined to make such an offer. Feliz declined salary arbitration, instead filing for free agency.

=== Philadelphia Phillies ===
On January 31, 2008, Feliz signed a two-year deal with the Philadelphia Phillies. The Giants had offered Feliz more guaranteed money, but Feliz felt alienated by the Giants' demeanor during contract negotiations. In 2008, struggling with an inflamed lower back, Feliz's power declined from previous seasons, but on October 29, 2008, he delivered one of the most important base hits in Phillies history, when he knocked in Eric Bruntlett, to plate the winning run, in Philadelphia's Game 5, World Series-clinching win over the Tampa Bay Rays.

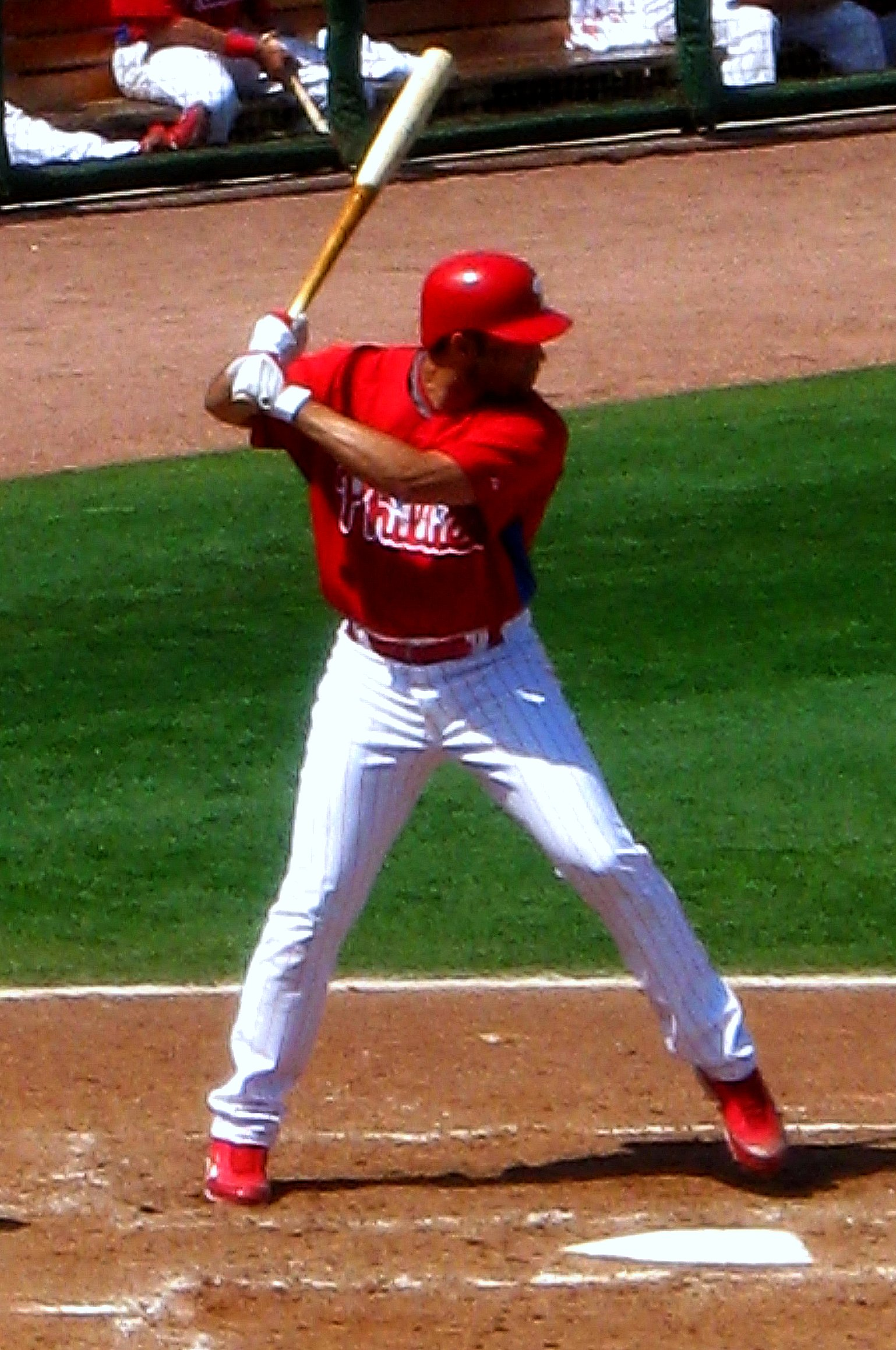
Feliz with the Philadelphia Phillies in 2009

On November 8, 2009, Philadelphia management declined to exercise Feliz's option for the 2010 season, thereby making him a free agent, once again.

=== Houston Astros ===
On December 10, 2009, Feliz signed a free agent, $4 million, 1-year deal, with the Houston Astros.

=== St. Louis Cardinals ===
On August 19, 2010, the Astros traded Feliz to the St. Louis Cardinals, in exchange for cash considerations and pitcher David Carpenter.

=== Kansas City Royals ===
On February 3, 2011, Feliz was signed to a Minor League Baseball (MiLB) deal by the Kansas City Royals, with an invitation to Spring Training. On March 27, he was released.

=== Camden Riversharks ===
On May 13, 2011, Feliz signed with the Camden Riversharks of the Atlantic League of Professional Baseball. In 72 games he hit .298/.362/.480 with 11 home runs, 45 RBIs and 1 stolen base.

=== San Diego Padres ===
On August 10, 2011, Feliz signed a minor league contract with the San Diego Padres and was assigned to the Triple-A Tucson Padres.

=== Camden Riversharks (second stint) ===
Pedro returned to the Riversharks for the 2012 season. In 79 games he hit .285/.335/.426 with 9 home runs and 38 RBIs.

== Personal life ==
Feliz and his wife Niurka Mateo were married in December 2002. They have 3 daughters and one son
