= 2001 Eastern League season =

The 2001 Eastern League season began on approximately April 1 and the regular season ended on approximately September 1.

The New Britain Rock Cats and Reading Phillies advanced to the ELCS. The teams were declared co-champions due to stoppage of play in professional baseball as a result of the September 11 attacks in the United States.

== Regular season ==
=== Standings ===
Eastern League – Northern Division
Team	Win	Loss	%	GB
**New Britain Rock Cats**	87	55	.613	–
Norwich Navigators	83	59	.585	4.0
Portland Sea Dogs	77	65	.542	10.0
Binghamton Mets	73	68	.518	13.5
Trenton Thunder	67	75	.472	20.0
New Haven Ravens	47	95	.331	40.0

Eastern League – Southern Division
Team	Win	Loss	%	GB
Erie SeaWolves	84	58	.592	–
**Reading Phillies**	77	65	.542	7.0
Akron Aeros	68	74	.479	16.0
Harrisburg Senators	66	76	.465	18.0
Altoona Curve	63	79	.444	21.0
Bowie Baysox	59	82	.418	24.5

Notes:

Green shade indicates that team advanced to the playoffs
Bold indicates that team advanced to ELCS
Italics indicates that New Britain and Reading were declared Eastern League co-champions

=== Statistical league leaders ===
==== Batting leaders ====
Stat	Player	Total
AVG	Dustan Mohr (New Britain Rock Cats)	.336
HR	Michael Rivera (Erie SeaWolves)	33
RBI	Eric Munson (Erie SeaWolves)	102
R	Marcus Thames (Norwich Navigators)	114

==== Pitching leaders ====
Stat	Player	Total
W	Carlos Silva (Reading Phillies)	15
ERA	Josh Stephens (Bowie Baysox)	1.84
SO	Ronald Chiavacci (Harrisburg Senators)	161
SV	Alexander Paacheco (Norwich Navigators)	26

== Playoffs ==
=== Divisional Series ===
==== Northern Division ====
The New Britain Rock Cats defeated the Norwich Navigators in the Northern Division playoffs 3 games to 1.

==== Southern Division ====
The Reading Phillies defeated the Erie SeaWolves in the Southern Division playoffs 3 games to 1.

=== Championship Series ===
The ELCS was not played in 2001 as a result of the September 11 attacks. The New Britain Rock Cats and Reading Phillies were declared co-champions due to stoppage of play in professional baseball
