= Guillermo Rodríguez (baseball) =

Venezuelan baseball player (born 1978)

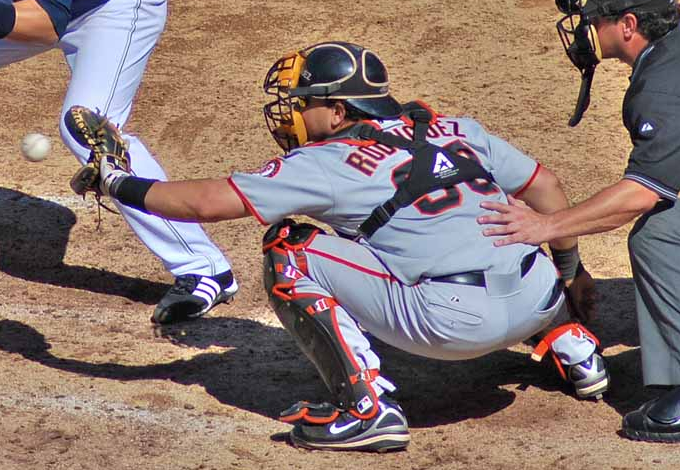
- Rodríguez playing for the Giants in 2007
- Catcher
- Born: May 15, 1978 (age 47); Barquisimeto, Venezuela
- Batted: Right Threw: Right

MLB debut
- June 13, 2007, for the San Francisco Giants

Last appearance
- October 3, 2009, for the Baltimore Orioles

MLB statistics
- Batting average: .253
- Home runs: 1
- Runs batted in: 14
- Stats at Baseball Reference

Teams
- San Francisco Giants (2007); Baltimore Orioles (2009)

Guillermo Segundo Rodríguez Pérez (born May 15, 1978) is a Venezuelan former professional baseball catcher and current coach in the San Francisco Giants organization. He played in Major League Baseball (MLB) for the San Francisco Giants and the Baltimore Orioles.

== Career ==
=== San Francisco Giants ===
Rodríguez was a 12-year minor league veteran who made his major league debut with the San Francisco Giants on June 13, 2007. He was called up as a replacement for injured catcher and fellow countryman Eliézer Alfonzo. Rodríguez had previously spent 1996 to 2006 with the Giants' minor league affiliates (excluding a 2004 season that saw him play for the Triple-A Toledo Mud Hens in the Detroit Tigers organization). On August 26, Rodriguez hit his first major league home run off Milwaukee Brewers pitcher Dave Bush. On September 1, 2008, the Giants released him.

=== Baltimore Orioles ===
On November 22, 2008, Rodríguez signed with the Baltimore Orioles organization. He made seven appearances for Baltimore during the 2009 campaign, going 0-for-5 with one RBI and two walks. On October 29, 2009, Rodríguez was removed from the 40-man roster and sent outright to the Triple-A Norfolk Tides.

In 762 minor league games, Rodríguez posted a .253 batting average with 65 home runs and 349 RBI.

=== Pericos de Puebla ===
On April 29, 2012, Rodríguez signed with the Pericos de Puebla of the Mexican League. In 21 appearances for the Pericos, he slashed .313/.421/.484 with two home runs, nine RBI, and three stolen bases. Rodríguez was released by Puebla on May 27.

== See also ==
- List of Major League Baseball players from Venezuela
