= Fred Lewis =

American baseball player (born 1980)

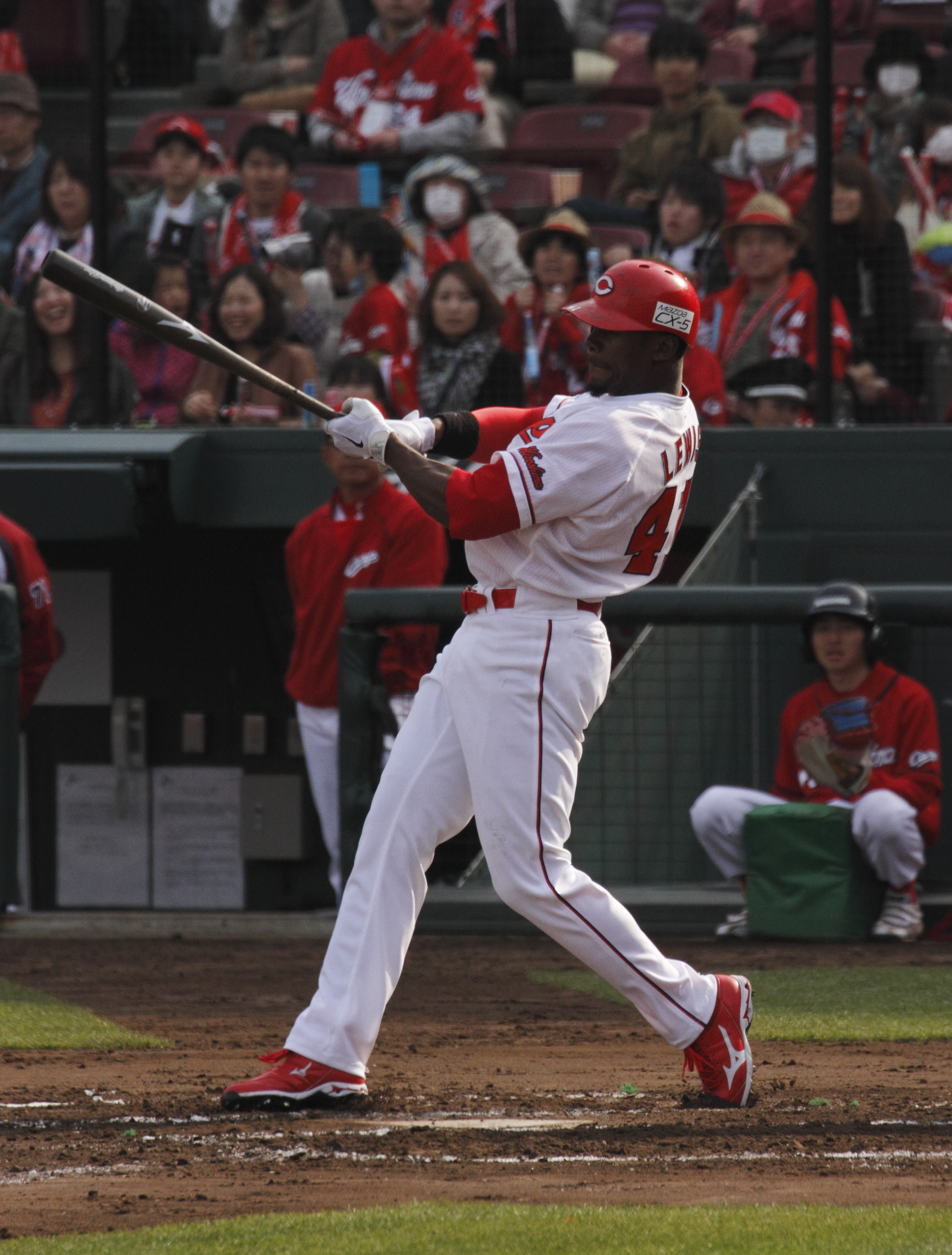
- Lewis with the Hiroshima Toyo Carp
- Left fielder
- Born: December 9, 1980 (age 45); Hattiesburg, Mississippi, U.S.
- Batted: Left Threw: Right

Professional debut
- MLB: September 1, 2006, for the San Francisco Giants
- NPB: March 29, 2013, for the Hiroshima Toyo Carp

Last appearance
- MLB: October 2, 2012, for the New York Mets
- NPB: August 16, 2013, for the Hiroshima Toyo Carp

MLB statistics
- Batting average: .266
- Home runs: 27
- Runs batted in: 136

NPB statistics
- Batting average: .268
- Home runs: 4
- Runs batted in: 20
- Stats at Baseball Reference

Teams
- San Francisco Giants (2006–2009); Toronto Blue Jays (2010); Cincinnati Reds (2011); New York Mets (2012); Hiroshima Toyo Carp (2013)

Frederick Deshaun Lewis (born December 9, 1980) is an American former professional baseball outfielder. He played in Major League Baseball (MLB) for the San Francisco Giants, Toronto Blue Jays, Cincinnati Reds, and New York Mets, and in Nippon Professional Baseball (NPB) for the Hiroshima Toyo Carp.

== High school and college ==
Lewis graduated from Stone High School in Wiggins, Mississippi in 1999, where he was a three sport star in basketball, football, and baseball. He went on to attend Mississippi Gulf Coast Community College, where he played both football and baseball.

After graduating in 2001, he was drafted in the 20th round (585th overall) by the Montreal Expos, but opted not to sign, instead attending Southern University in Baton Rouge, Louisiana to play baseball. While attending Southern University, Lewis flipped a truck he was driving on a rainy night, and three of the occupants in the car were killed.

== Professional career ==
=== San Francisco Giants ===
==== Minor leagues ====
Lewis was drafted by the San Francisco Giants in the second round (66th overall) of the 2002 Major League Baseball draft, and was sent to the Low-A Salem-Keizer Volcanoes. While there, earned Northwest League All-Star honors, leading the league with a .322 batting average, while finishing 5th for both hits (77) and on-base percentage (.396). Lewis also was named co-Player of Month for July, along with Dan Ortmeier and Greg Bruso.

Lewis spent all of 2003 with the Hagerstown Suns, where he finished the season second in the Giants organization with 30 stolen bases. He also led the team with 61 runs scored, while ranking 3rd in games (114) and doubles (17). Lewis finished the season with a .250 batting average, but as a result of leading the team in walks with 68, wound up with a .361 on-base percentage.

Lewis starred on the Norwich Navigators in Norwich, Connecticut, where it was customary for fans to shout his name while he was at bat, on deck, running in from the field or anywhere else in view. Lewis would choose the loudest fans to join him in Fred Lewis' Pancake Breakfasts.

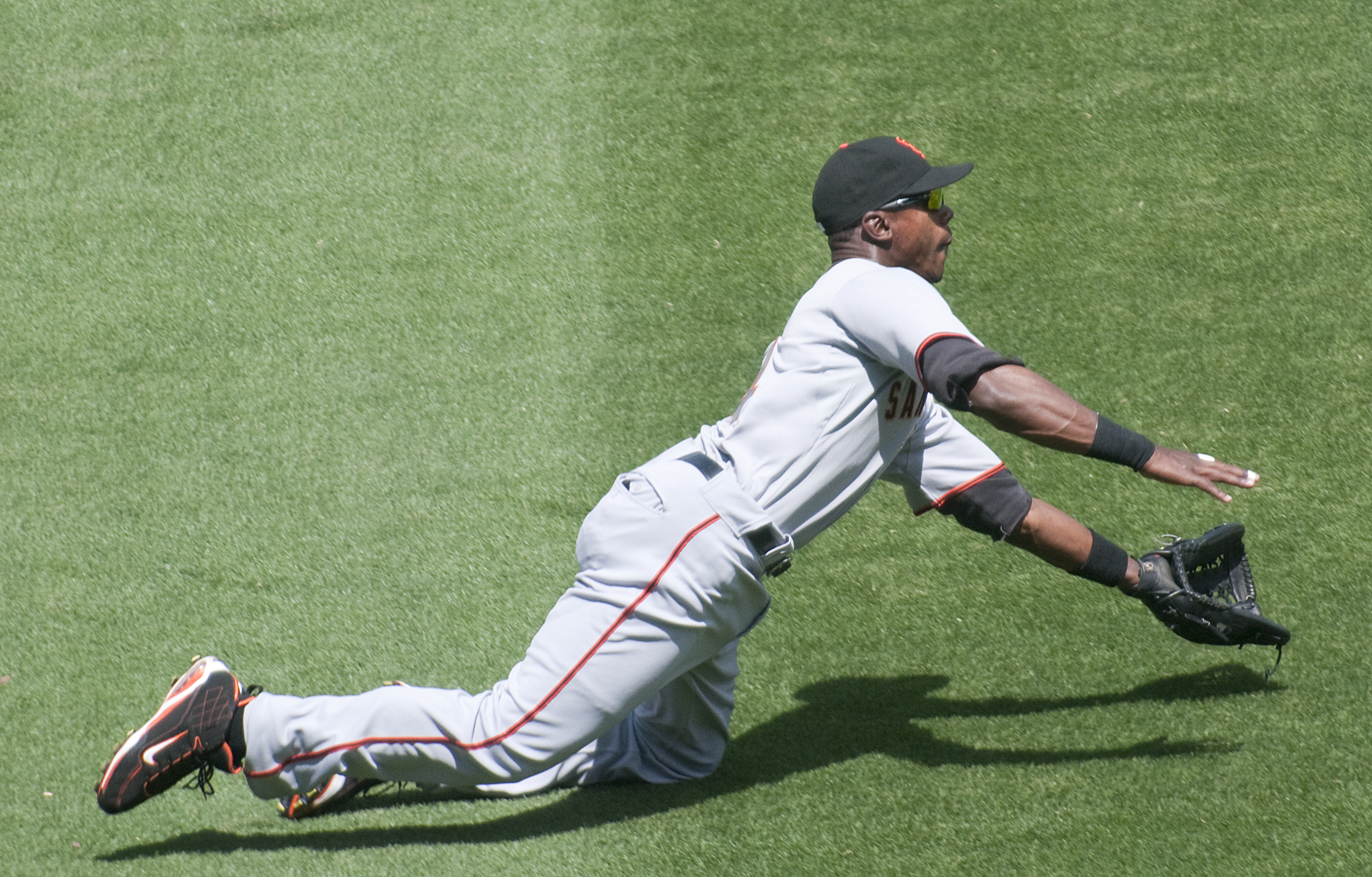
Lewis playing for the San Francisco Giants in 2009

==== Major leagues ====
Lewis was a September call-up in 2006, making his debut on September 1 at Wrigley Field against the Chicago Cubs; he had a base hit in each of his first three at bats. Lewis finished the year 5–11 with 2 RBI.

Lewis made his first appearance on a Major League 25-man roster on May 6, 2007, and hit for the cycle on May 13, Mother's Day, in only his 16th game in the majors at Colorado. Lewis doubled leading off the game, then hit a three-run opposite-field home run in the fourth inning (both against Taylor Buchholz), followed by an RBI triple in the fifth (against Tom Martin) and a single leading off the seventh inning (against Denny Bautista). Lewis' cycle was the 22nd in Giants franchise history. Lewis is one of only a handful of Major League Baseball players to hit his first homer as part of a cycle.

On June 1, Lewis hit his first MLB grand slam against the Philadelphia Phillies. About a month later, on July 4, Lewis hit another grand slam against the Cincinnati Reds, becoming the first player in San Francisco Giants history to hit two grand slams in his rookie season.

On April 26, 2008, Lewis hit the 46th Splash Hit at AT&T Park. On July 27, 2008, Lewis became the first left-handed batter to get four hits against Randy Johnson in a game. In the first at-bat in this game, a fog horn went off as Johnson was releasing his pitch, causing him to throw an eephus pitch which fell for a strike. Lewis led the majors in steals of home in 2008 with 2, but was also caught twice while attempting to steal home.

=== Toronto Blue Jays ===
On April 16, 2010, Lewis was traded to the Toronto Blue Jays. Lewis had a somewhat successful stay with Toronto, batting first in the batting order on a regular basis with a .276 batting average.

On December 3, 2010, the Blue Jays declined to tender a contract to Lewis prior to the non-tender deadline, thereby making him a free agent.

=== Cincinnati Reds ===
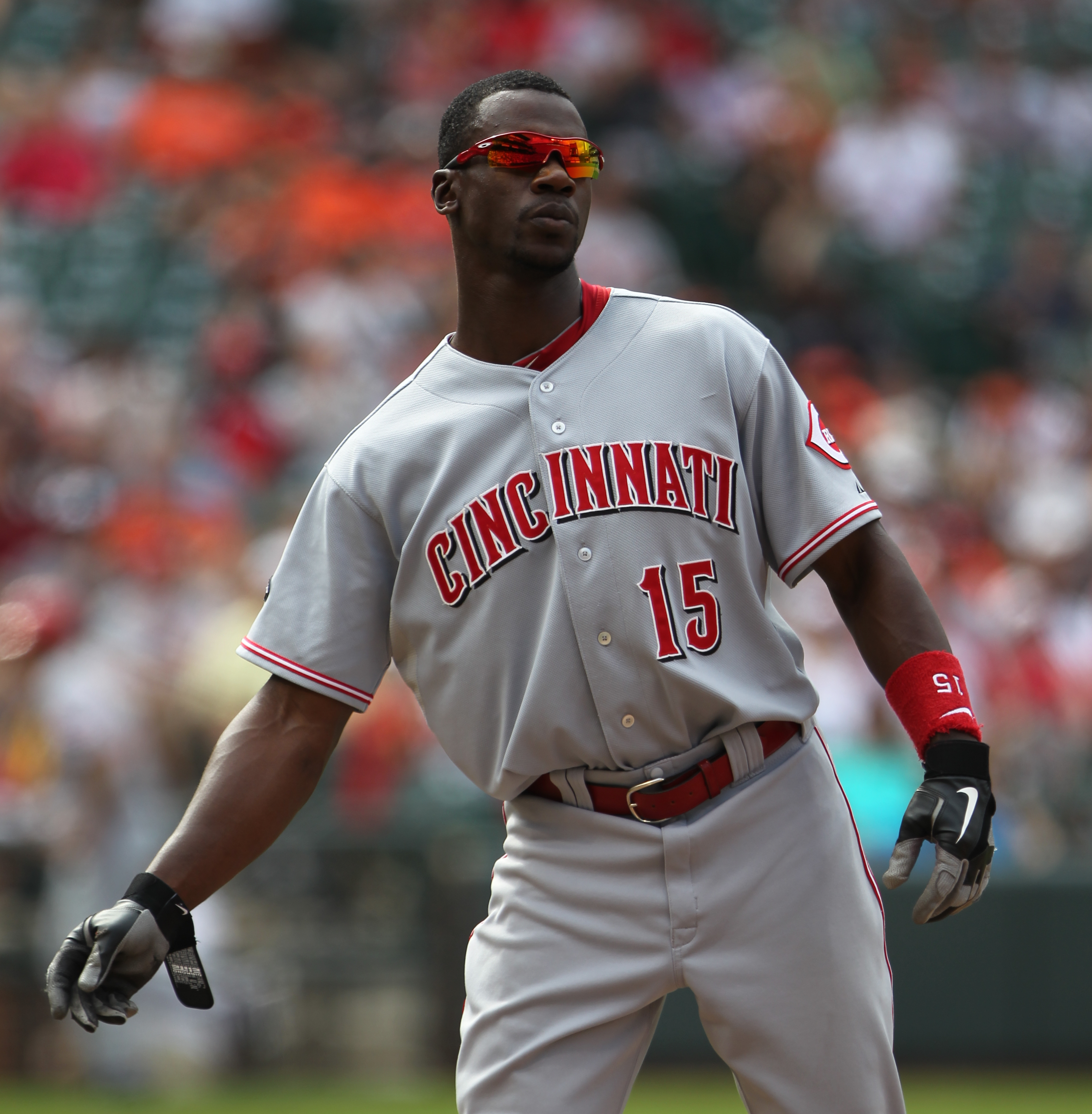
Lewis with the Cincinnati Reds in 2011

On January 10, 2011, it was announced that Lewis had signed a one-year, $900,000 contract with the Cincinnati Reds. In 81 appearances for the Reds, he batted .230/.321/.317 with three home runs, 19 RBI, and two stolen bases. On September 1, Lewis was removed from the 40-man roster and sent outright to the Triple-A Louisville Bats. He elected free agency on October 27.

=== New York Mets ===
Lewis signed a minor league contract with the Cleveland Indians on January 19, 2012, which included an invitation to the team's spring training camp. On April 2, Lewis was released by the Indians, prior to the start of the season.

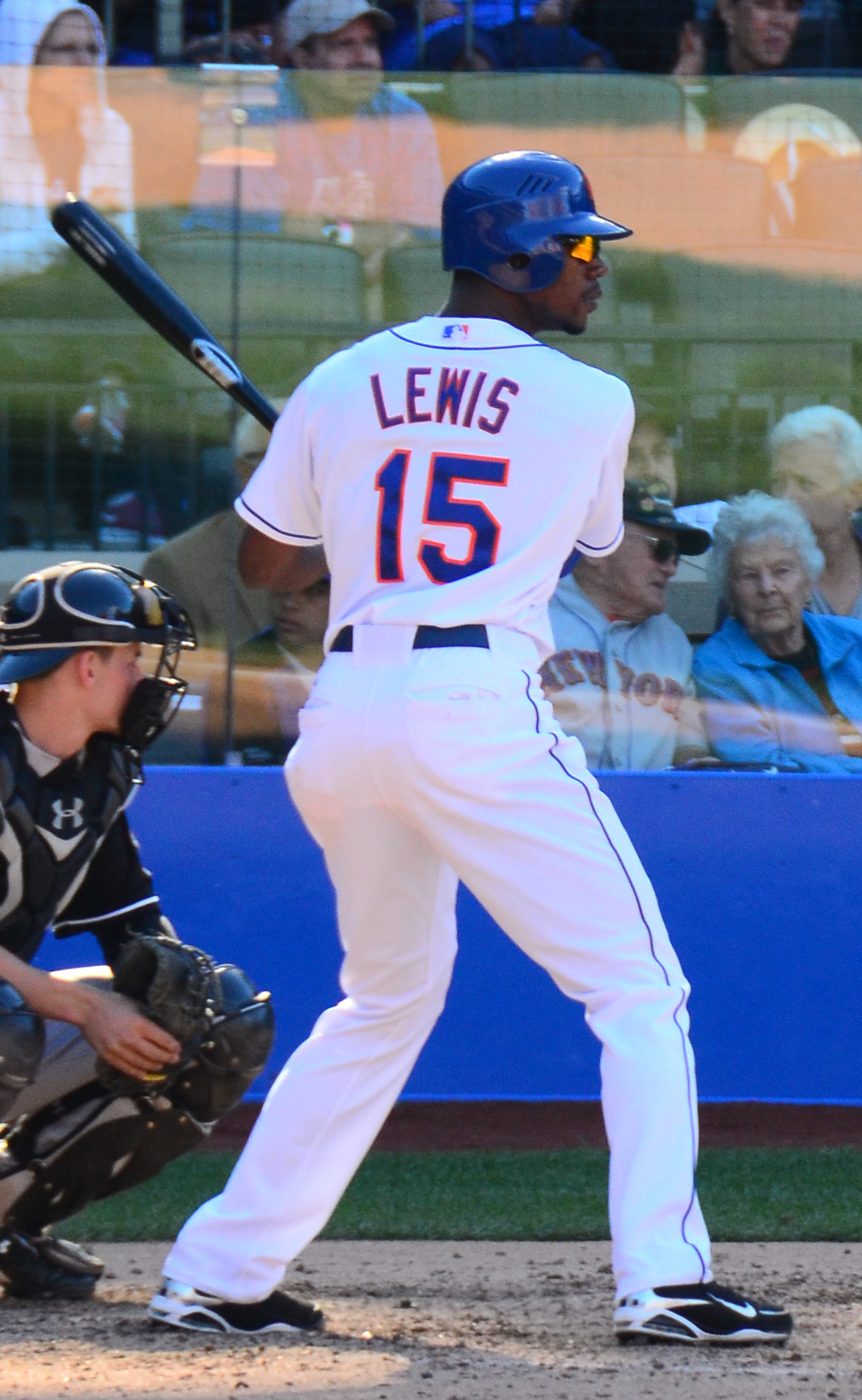
Lewis batting for the New York Mets in 2012

On April 25, 2012, Lewis signed a minor league contract with the New York Mets. On September 3, the Mets selected the contract of Lewis as rosters expanded. He posted a .150/.320/.150 in 25 plate appearances over 18 games. Lewis was then outrighted off of the 40-man roster on October 16, and opted to become a free agent.

=== Hiroshima Toyo Carp ===
On November 9, 2012, Lewis signed a one-year, $400,000 deal with a club option for 2014 with the Hiroshima Toyo Carp of Nippon Professional Baseball. The deal included a $150,000 signing bonus.

=== Atlantic League ===
Lewis signed with the Lancaster Barnstormers of the Atlantic League of Professional Baseball for the 2014 season. He was later traded to the Bridgeport Bluefish. Lewis signed with the Southern Maryland Blue Crabs for the 2015 season. He re-signed with the team on April 8, 2016.

== Personal life ==
Lewis was named after Hurricane Frederic which hit his home state the year before he was born.

He is a second cousin of Matt Lawton.

In November 2001, Lewis was driving a truck in a storm on U.S. Route 49 in Mississippi when it hydroplaned and crashed into a ditch. Three passengers, two of them Lewis' cousins, died in the accident.

Lewis' son, Kaleb, was born in 2002 or 2003. He lived in Chatham, New Jersey for a brief time before moving to Toronto. In 2019, Lewis opened a daiquiri shop in Gulfport, Mississippi.

== See also ==
- List of Major League Baseball players to hit for the cycle

Achievements
Preceded by Chone Figgins	Hitting for the cycle May 13, 2007	Succeeded by Mark Ellis
