= Chad Santos =

American baseball player (born 1981)

- First baseman
- Born: April 28, 1981 (age 45); Honolulu, Hawaii, U.S.
- Batted: Left Threw: Left

MLB debut
- July 16, 2006, for the San Francisco Giants

Last MLB appearance
- July 20, 2006, for the San Francisco Giants

MLB statistics
- Batting average: .429
- Home runs: 1
- Runs batted in: 2
- Stats at Baseball Reference

Teams
- San Francisco Giants (2006)

Chad Roque Santos (born April 28, 1981) is an American former Major League Baseball first baseman. He bats and throws left-handed.

Santos was drafted by the Kansas City Royals in the 22nd round of the 1999 Major League Baseball draft. He last played in 2006 with the San Francisco Giants. He had three hits, one a home run, in three games, in his one-year career.
