= Randy Messenger =

American baseball player (born 1981)

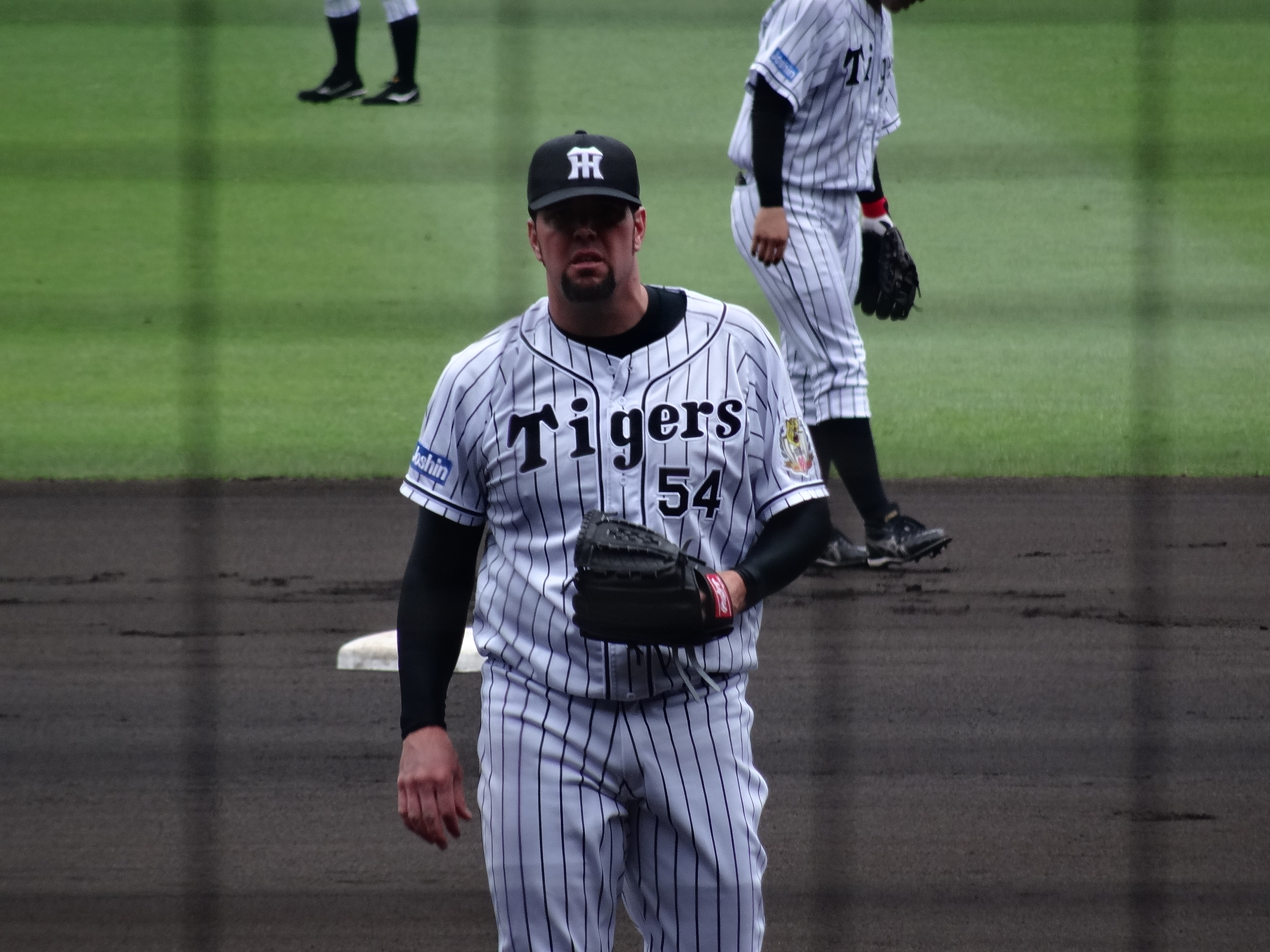
- Messenger with the Hanshin Tigers
- Pitcher
- Born: August 13, 1981 (age 44); Reno, Nevada, U.S.
- Batted: Right Threw: Right

Professional debut
- MLB: June 22, 2005, for the Florida Marlins
- NPB: March 26, 2010, for the Hanshin Tigers

Last appearance
- MLB: October 4, 2009, for the Seattle Mariners
- NPB: September 29, 2019, for the Hanshin Tigers

MLB statistics
- Win–loss record: 4–11
- Earned run average: 4.90
- Strikeouts: 115

NPB statistics
- Win–loss record: 98–84
- Earned run average: 3.13
- Strikeouts: 1,475
- Stats at Baseball Reference

Teams
- Florida Marlins (2005–2007); San Francisco Giants (2007); Seattle Mariners (2008–2009); Hanshin Tigers (2010–2019)

Career highlights and awards
- NPB All-Star (2018)

Randall Jerome Messenger (born August 13, 1981), nicknamed "Big Mess", is an American former professional baseball pitcher, best known for his time with the Hanshin Tigers of Nippon Professional Baseball. He is 6 feet 6 inches (1.98 m) tall and weighs 265 pounds (120 kg). He made his Major League debut on June 22, 2005 for the Florida Marlins. Messenger graduated from Sparks High School in 1999.

== Professional career ==
=== Florida Marlins ===
Messenger was drafted in the 1999 Major League Baseball draft in the 11th round, 326th overall, by the Florida Marlins. In 1999 Messenger went 0–3 with a 7.52 ERA in 13 outings, including two starts, for Gulf Coast League Marlins. He also spent the 2000 with the GCL Marlins going 2–2 with a 4.83 ERA in 12 starts.

Messenger went 2–1 with a 3.93 ERA in 14 relief outings for the Single-A Kane County Cougars of the Midwest League. He also was 7–4 with a 4.08 ERA in 18 starts for the High-A Brevard County Manatees of the Florida State League.

In 2001, Messenger set a career high in wins with a record of 11–8 while posting a 4.37 ERA in 28 outings, including 27 starts, for the High-A Jupiter Hammerheads of the Florida State League.

He was promoted to the Double-A Carolina Mudcats in 2003. Messenger went 5–7 with a 5.46 ERA in 29 outings, including 23 starts. In 2004 he stayed with the Mudcats going 6–3 with a 2.58 ERA and 21 saves in 58 relief outings.

Messenger went 4–2 with a 3.88 ERA in 39 relief outings for the Triple-A Albuquerque Isotopes in 2005. He posted a 5.29 ERA in 29 relief outings for Marlins in his first stint on the Major Leagues.

In 2006, Messenger went 2–7 with a 5.67 ERA in 59 relief outings for Marlins. He gave up three runs on one hit in four relief appearances for Triple-A Albuquerque. Messenger also tossed a scoreless inning for High-A Jupiter.

Messenger went 1–1 with a 2.66 ERA in 23 relief appearances for Marlins in 2007.

=== San Francisco Giants ===
On May 31, 2007, Messenger was traded to the San Francisco Giants for Armando Benítez. He did not allow an earned run in his first seven relief outings for Giants, spanning 8 1/3 frames and finished the season with the Giants 1–3 with one save in 37 outings.

On March 5, 2008, he was optioned down to Triple-A Fresno. He was released on March 12, but signed a new minor league deal with the Giants a few days later.

=== Seattle Mariners ===
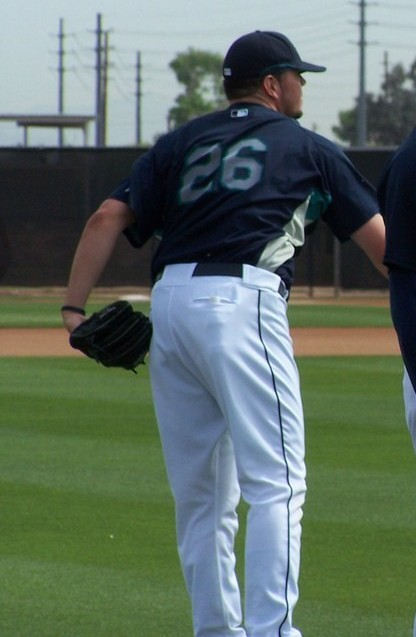
Messenger with the Seattle Mariners

After being released by the Giants, Messenger signed a minor league contract with the Seattle Mariners on July 11, 2008, and was assigned to the Triple-A Tacoma Rainiers going 6–0 with one save and a 2.38 ERA in 12 outings with Tacoma. He was called up on August 25 where in 13 games he had a 3.55 ERA.

Messenger was released by the Mariners on January 28, 2009. He re-signed with the team to a minor league deal two days later. On October 29, he was outrighted off the 40-man roster. On November 9, he was granted free agency.

=== Hanshin Tigers ===
Messenger signed with the Hanshin Tigers on December 9, 2009. After splitting time as a starter and reliever for the Tigers in 2010, Messenger became a mainstay in the starting rotation from 2011. Through eight seasons with the Tigers at the end of 2017, Messenger has an 84–70 record with a 2.98 ERA and 1271 strikeouts in 1353 2/3 innings pitched. He also has 16 complete games and 10 shutouts.

Messenger was selected for the 2018 NPB All-Star Game. He announced his retirement at the end of the 2019 season in September.
