= Matt Morris (baseball) =

American baseball player (born 1974)

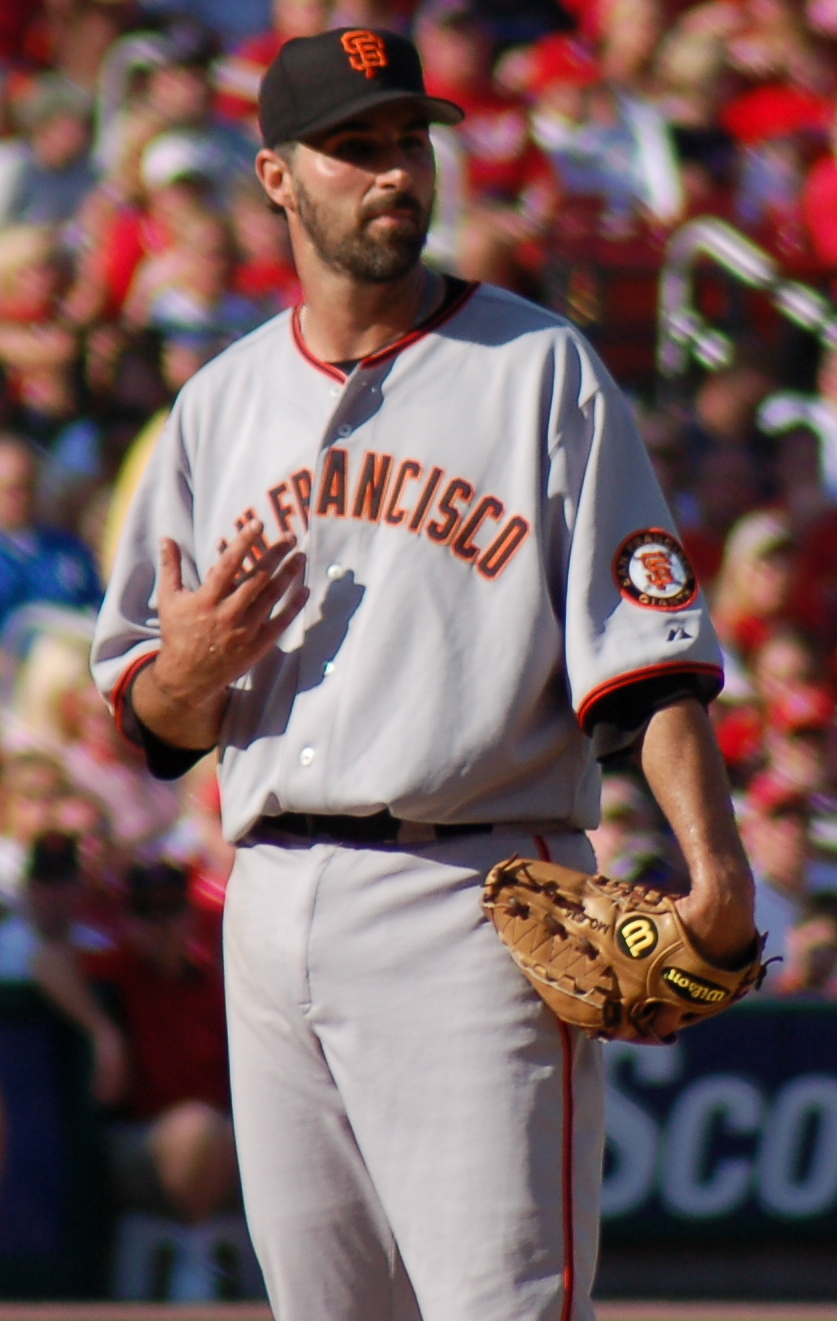
- Morris with the San Francisco Giants in 2006
- Pitcher
- Born: August 9, 1974 (age 52); Middletown, New York, U.S.
- Batted: Right Threw: Right

MLB debut
- April 4, 1997, for the St. Louis Cardinals

Last MLB appearance
- April 26, 2008, for the Pittsburgh Pirates

MLB statistics
- Win–loss record: 121–92
- Earned run average: 3.98
- Strikeouts: 1,214
- Stats at Baseball Reference

Teams
- St. Louis Cardinals (1997–1998, 2000–2005); San Francisco Giants (2006–2007); Pittsburgh Pirates (2007–2008)

Career highlights and awards
- 2× All-Star (2001, 2002); NL wins leader (2001); St. Louis Cardinals Hall of Fame

Matthew Christian Morris (born August 9, 1974) is an American former professional baseball pitcher. He played 11 seasons in Major League Baseball (MLB), most notably for the St. Louis Cardinals, where he was a two-time All-Star and led the National League in 2001 with 22 wins. After playing nine seasons with the Cardinals, he played his last three seasons with the San Francisco Giants and Pittsburgh Pirates.

== Early life ==
Morris was born in Middletown, New York, the youngest of three children of George, a Vietnam War veteran and Local 580 ironworker, and Diane Morris. Both of his sisters played softball for the Wagner College Seahawks.

Morris moved to nearby Montgomery, New York, at 13 years old where he played baseball at Valley Central High School. After a strong performance while trying out at the Empire State Games, he was converted from an infielder to a pitcher. He was selected in the 25th round of the 1992 Major League Baseball draft by the Milwaukee Brewers, but chose instead to attend Seton Hall University and play college baseball for the Pirates under head coach Mike Sheppard.

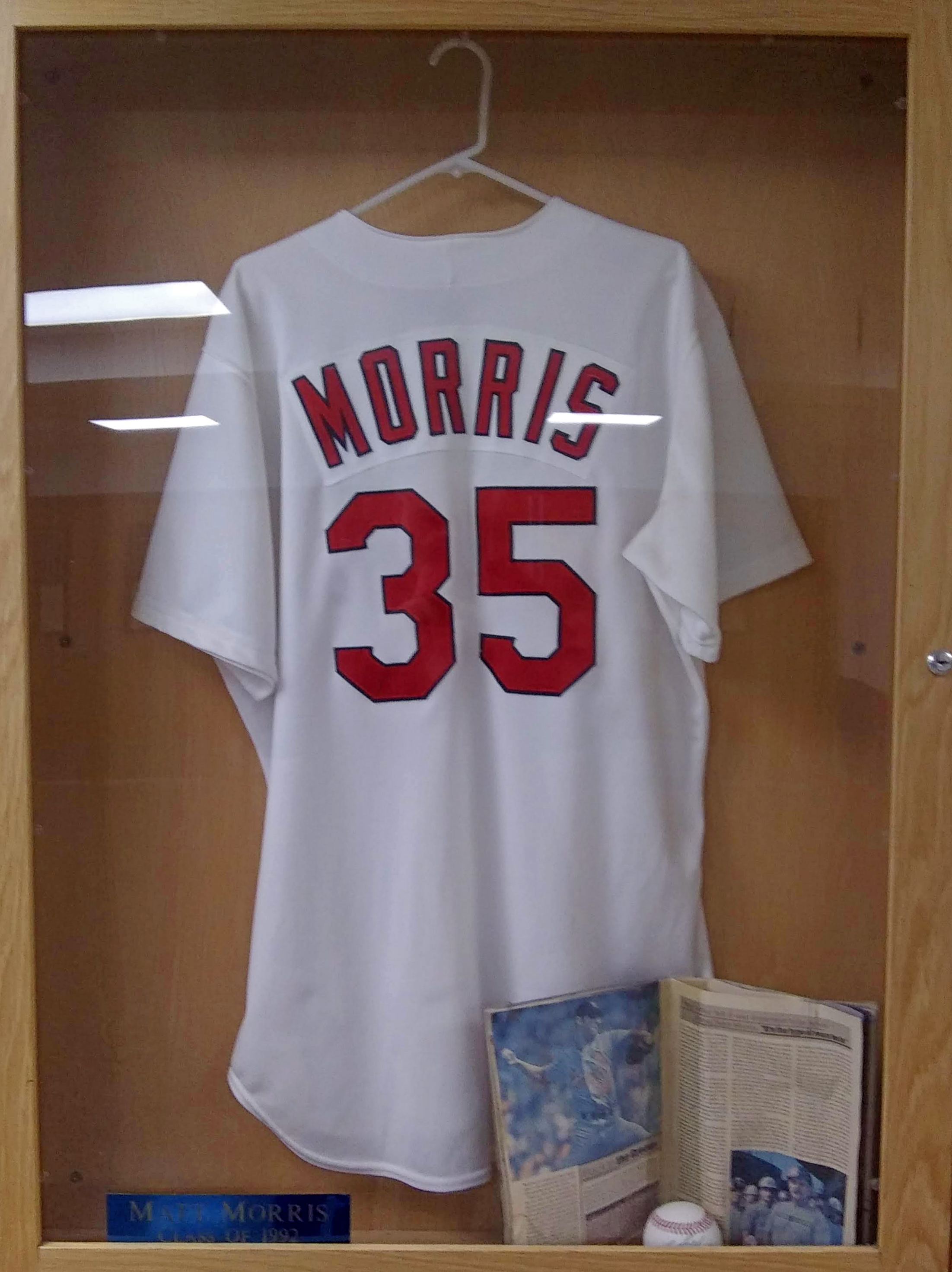
Morris's Cardinals' jersey on display at Valley Central High School

At Seton Hall, Morris was named first-team All-America as a junior by Baseball America and the American Baseball Coaches Association. He was teammates with Jason Grilli. In 1993, he played collegiate summer baseball in the Cape Cod Baseball League for the Hyannis Mets where he tossed a no-hitter to batterymate Jason Varitek and was named a league all-star.

== Career ==
He was drafted 12th overall in the June 1995 draft by the St. Louis Cardinals. Morris pitched in the minor leagues in 1996 and 1997. In 1996, led the Texas League with 4 shutouts while pitching for the Double-A Arkansas Travelers and led all Cardinal minor league pitchers with 175 innings pitched. In 1997, he reached the majors after only one game at Triple-A Louisville. In his first season, he won 12 games with a 3.19 ERA and finished tied for second in the Rookie of the Year voting, behind Scott Rolen.

In 1999, he underwent Tommy John surgery after he was injured in spring training. Morris became the ace of the Cardinals' pitching staff in 2001, earning his first All-Star selection and a third-place finish in the NL Cy Young voting. He won 22 games with 185 strikeouts and a 3.16 ERA. In 2002, he won 17 games and made his second All-Star appearance.

In 2004, Morris signed a one-year contract after he won 15 games on a Cardinals team that made the World Series. In 2004, he lost 10 games for the first time in his career and had a 4.72 ERA, also a career high. On June 20 Ken Griffey Jr. hit his 500th home run off Morris.

Morris underwent surgery during the 2004/2005 off-season and started the season 8–0 with a 3.16 ERA, and was 10–2 with a 3.10 ERA at the time of the All-Star break. In fact, he was considered by many to be snubbed for the All-Star game. Morris went 4–7 with a 5.55 ERA after the All-Star break. He was the number three starter for the Cardinals in the playoffs, behind ace Chris Carpenter and Mark Mulder. He became the first winning pitcher in a postseason game at Petco Park when the Cardinals defeated the San Diego Padres in Game 3 of the 2005 NLDS. In the thin free agent market of the 2005/2006 off-season, Morris was touted as one of the best available pitchers.

On December 12, 2005, Morris signed a three-year contract with the San Francisco Giants worth $27 million. He had an injury-filled year with the Giants in 2006, going 10–15 with a 4.98 ERA.

Prior to the 2007 season, Morris changed his uniform number from 35, which he had worn for his entire career, to wear number 22 as a tribute to retired former teammate Mike Matheny. Rich Aurilia took the number 35 jersey.

On July 31, 2007, Morris was traded to the Pittsburgh Pirates for center field prospect Rajai Davis and pitcher Stephen MacFarland.

Morris started off the 2008 season with a 0–4 record and a 9.67 ERA in five starts. On April 27, 2008, Morris was released by the Pirates. He retired three days later, on April 30, 2008.

== Personal life ==
Morris married the former Heather Reader on December 7, 2002, and together they have four children, Lola Morris, Sydney Morris, Harper Morris, Peyton Morris. As of 2014, they lived in Big Sky, Montana.

== See also ==
- List of Major League Baseball annual wins leaders
- List of St. Louis Cardinals team records
