= Vinnie Chulk =

American baseball player (born 1978)

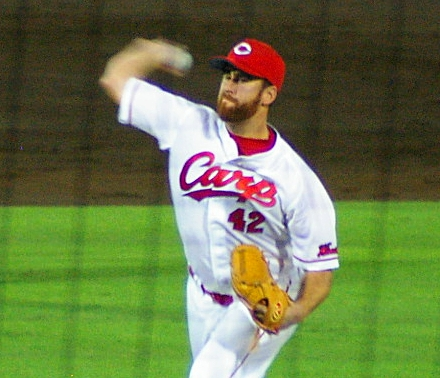
- Chulk with the Hiroshima Toyo Carp in 2010
- Pitcher
- Born: December 19, 1978 (age 46); Miami, Florida, U.S.
- Batted: Right Threw: Right

Professional debut
- MLB: September 8, 2003, for the Toronto Blue Jays
- NPB: August 1, 2010, for the Hiroshima Toyo Carp

Last appearance
- MLB: May 18, 2012, for the Milwaukee Brewers
- NPB: September 14, 2010, for the Hiroshima Toyo Carp

MLB statistics
- Win–loss record: 8–15
- Earned run average: 4.51
- Strikeouts: 199

NPB statistics
- Win–loss record: 2–0
- Earned run average: 5.79
- Strikeouts: 12
- Stats at Baseball Reference

Teams
- Toronto Blue Jays (2003–2006); San Francisco Giants (2006–2008); Cleveland Indians (2009); Hiroshima Toyo Carp (2010); Milwaukee Brewers (2012)

Charles Vincent Chulk (born December 19, 1978) is an American former professional baseball relief pitcher. He played in Major League Baseball (MLB) for the Toronto Blue Jays, San Francisco Giants, Cleveland Indians, and Milwaukee Brewers, and in Nippon Professional Baseball (NPB) for the Hiroshima Toyo Carp. He is of Cuban heritage.

== Early life ==
Chulk played baseball at the Perrine Khoury League throughout much of his childhood, and graduated in 1996 from Miami Palmetto Senior High School. That year, he was named MVP and received Best Pitcher Award. He defeated the Southridge Spartans during the playoffs in 1996, the team that had cut him the year prior. He attended St. Thomas University in Miami, where he graduated in 2000, majoring in Sports Management. Chulk played college baseball and received Best Pitcher Award of the Sun Conference in 1998, 1999, and 2000, and the Regional Pitcher of the Year Award in his senior year.

== Professional career ==
Chulk played for the Toronto Blue Jays of the American League from 2003 to 2006. On July 21, 2006, he was traded by Toronto to the San Francisco Giants of the National League with Shea Hillenbrand in exchange for reliever Jeremy Accardo. He was designated for assignment by the Giants on June 24, 2008. He became a free agent at the end of the season.

Chulk signed a minor league contract with the Cleveland Indians on January 15, 2009. The deal was finalized in February. The Indians purchased his contract and added him to the roster on April 11. On May 6, Chulk was designated for assignment. He cleared waivers and accepted a minor league assignment to Triple-A affiliate Columbus Clippers. In October 2009, Chulk was granted free agency.

He was signed to a minor league contract by the Pittsburgh Pirates on December 7, 2009.

In July 2010, Chulk's rights were sold to the Hiroshima Toyo Carp of Nippon Professional Baseball.

He signed a minor league contract with the Oakland Athletics in December 2010.

For the 2012 season, Chulk played in the Milwaukee Brewers organization. On April 28, after going 0–0 with a 3.18 ERA and 10 strikeouts in 11.1 innings, the Brewers purchased his contract from Triple-A Nashville. Chulk was designated for assignment by Milwaukee on May 19, 2012. Following the season, he became a free agent.
