= Scott Munter =

American baseball player

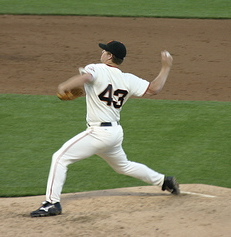
- Pitcher
- Born: March 7, 1980 (age 46); Norfolk, Nebraska, U.S.
- Batted: Right Threw: Right

MLB debut
- May 11, 2005, for the San Francisco Giants

Last MLB appearance
- September 28, 2007, for the San Francisco Giants

MLB statistics
- Win–loss record: 3–2
- Earned run average: 4.75
- Strikeouts: 22
- Stats at Baseball Reference

Teams
- San Francisco Giants (2005–2007)

Scott Michael Munter (born March 7, 1980) is an American former Major League Baseball relief pitcher.

He attended St. James/Seton grade school and Creighton Preparatory School in Omaha, Nebraska. He then attended the University of Oklahoma, where he played first base, after which transferring to Butler County Community College in Kansas where he starting pitching.

Munter split the 2005 season between the San Francisco Giants and their Triple-A affiliate, the Fresno Grizzlies. With the Giants, he posted a 2–0 record with a 2.56 ERA in 45 appearances, all of them in relief.

Munter was not offered a new contract by the Giants and became a free agent on December 12, 2007. On January 25, 2008, Munter was signed to a minor league contract by the Tampa Bay Rays and was invited to spring training. On June 3, 2008, Munter was re-signed by the Giants after being released from the Rays Triple-A affiliate. He became a free agent at the end of the season and signed a minor league contract with the Colorado Rockies. He then returned to the Giants organization, where he stayed through 2012.

Munter bats and throws right-handed. He throws a heavy sinker as hard as 95 MPH, dubbed by his former manager Felipe Alou as a "bowling-ball sinker," and is very difficult to hit in the air. Munter lacks a breaking pitch, however, and, despite his velocity, does not strike out a lot of hitters. His nickname is "Mad Dog" because he is 6 ft 6 in and over 250 pounds.
