= Steve Decker =

American baseball player (born 1965)

- Catcher
- Born: October 25, 1965 (age 60); Rock Island, Illinois, U.S.
- Batted: Right Threw: Right

MLB debut
- September 18, 1990, for the San Francisco Giants

Last MLB appearance
- October 1, 1999, for the Anaheim Angels

MLB statistics
- Batting average: .221
- Home runs: 13
- Runs batted in: 72
- Stats at Baseball Reference

Teams
- San Francisco Giants (1990–1992); Florida Marlins (1993, 1995); San Francisco Giants (1996); Colorado Rockies (1996); Anaheim Angels (1999)

Stephen Michael Decker (born October 25, 1965) is an American former professional baseball catcher. He played for four Major League Baseball teams from 1990–1993, 1995–1996, and 1999.

== Coaching career ==
Decker began his coaching career as a hitting coach for the Salem-Keizer Volcanoes in 2001–02 and the Fresno Grizzlies in 2003–04. He then managed for Salem-Keizer (2005–07), the San Jose Giants (2008), the Connecticut Defenders (2009), and the Fresno Grizzlies (2010–11).

In 2012, he swapped positions with Bob Mariano, who replaced him as the Grizzlies' manager, and became coordinator of minor-league hitting instruction for the Giants. In 2015, he took his first major league coaching position as assistant hitting coach for the San Francisco Giants.

== Personal life ==
Decker is married with two daughters and resides in Keizer, Oregon.
