= Todd Linden =

American baseball player (born 1980)

- Outfielder
- Born: June 30, 1980 (age 45); Edmonds, Washington, U.S.
- Batted: Switch Threw: Right

MLB debut
- August 18, 2003, for the San Francisco Giants

Last MLB appearance
- September 30, 2007, for the Florida Marlins

MLB statistics
- Batting average: .231
- Home runs: 8
- Runs batted in: 36
- Stats at Baseball Reference

Teams
- San Francisco Giants (2003–2007); Florida Marlins (2007); Tohoku Rakuten Golden Eagles (2009–2010)

Todd Anthony "Moose" Linden (born June 30, 1980) is an American former professional baseball outfielder. He played in Major League Baseball (MLB) for the San Francisco Giants and Florida Marlins; and in Nippon Professional Baseball (NPB) for the Tohoku Rakuten Golden Eagles.

== Early life ==
Before being drafted by the San Francisco Giants, he attended Central Kitsap High School in Silverdale, Washington and played collegiate baseball at the University of Washington. After a tumultuous two years at Washington, Linden transferred to Louisiana State University, where he played center field. At LSU, Linden distinguished himself as a switch hitter by setting a Southeastern Conference record for games in a season with home runs hit from both sides of the plate. After the 2000 season, he played collegiate summer baseball with the Chatham A's of the Cape Cod Baseball League and was named a league all-star. Nicknamed "Moose" by his Scranton/Wilkes-Barre Yankees teammates after a horrible offensive showing in Charlotte, where he was visibly frustrated by a Charlotte Knights fan in the front row who berated him with moose references.

== Professional career ==
=== San Francisco Giants ===
His first major league home run came on September 22, 2003, off Los Angeles Dodgers pitcher Kazuhisa Ishii. Linden, in only his 24th major league at-bat, became just the 12th player to hit a home run into the second deck at Dodger Stadium, which opened in 1962. On May 10, 2007, he was designated for assignment.

=== Florida Marlins ===
He was claimed off waivers by the Florida Marlins on May 18, 2007. The Marlins released him following the 2007 season.

=== Oakland Athletics ===
On November 21, 2007, he was signed by the Oakland Athletics to a minor league contract (Sacramento River Cats) with an invitation to spring training, but did not make the A's roster. On May 20, 2008, Linden was released by the Oakland A's.

=== Cleveland Indians ===
On May 27, 2008, Linden signed a minor league contract with the Cleveland Indians and was assigned to their Triple-A affiliate, the Buffalo Bisons. He became a free agent at the end of the season.

=== New York Yankees ===
In January 2009 Linden signed a minor league contract (Scranton/Wilkes-Barre Yankees) with an invitation to spring training with the New York Yankees.

=== Tohoku Rakuten Golden Eagles ===
On June 12, 2009, the Yankees sold Linden's contract to the Tohoku Rakuten Golden Eagles of the Japanese Pacific League.

=== San Francisco Giants ===
Linden attended minor league camp with the Giants in 2012.

== Coaching ==
Linden is currently a coach in the San Francisco Giants minor league system. He also coaches for city baseball year round.
