= Eliézer Alfonzo =

Venezuelan baseball player (born 1979)

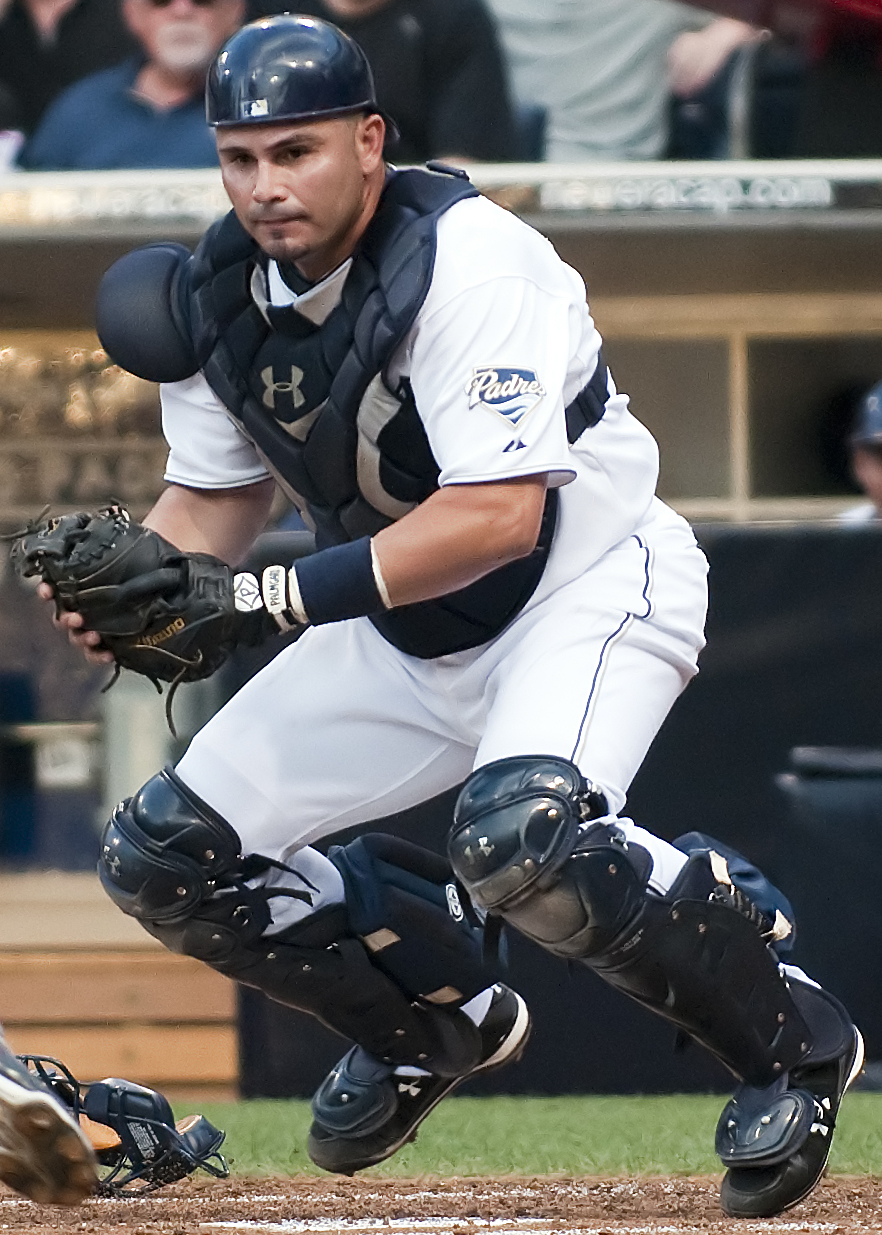
- Alfonzo with the San Diego Padres
- Catcher
- Born: February 7, 1979 (age 47); Puerto La Cruz, Anzoátegui, Venezuela
- Batted: Right Threw: Right

MLB debut
- June 3, 2006, for the San Francisco Giants

Last MLB appearance
- September 13, 2011, for the Colorado Rockies

MLB statistics
- Batting average: .240
- Home runs: 17
- Runs batted in: 67
- Stats at Baseball Reference

Teams
- San Francisco Giants (2006–2008); San Diego Padres (2009); Seattle Mariners (2010); Colorado Rockies (2011)

Eliézer Jesús Alfonzo (/ɪˈliːzər/; Spanish pronunciation: [eˈljeθeɾ]; born February 7, 1979) is a Venezuelan former professional baseball catcher and coach. He played all or parts of six seasons in Major League Baseball (MLB) for the San Francisco Giants, San Diego Padres, Seattle Mariners, and Colorado Rockies. He bats and throws right-handed, and is the second cousin of former MLB star Edgardo Alfonzo.

== Professional career ==
=== St. Louis Cardinals ===
Alfonzo originally signed as a non-drafted free agent by the St. Louis Cardinals on July 13, 1996. Alfonzo made his professional debut as a third baseman for St. Louis' affiliate in Dominican Summer League he batted .325 in 24 games. He was converted to catcher in 1997 and batted .275 in 38 contests for the Rookie-level Johnson City Cardinals.

=== Milwaukee Brewers ===
He stayed in the Cardinals' organization until being traded to the Milwaukee Brewers on June 13, 2000, to complete off-season trade that sent Fernando Viña to the Cardinals. He spent remainder of the 2000 campaign at the Class-A Beloit Snappers hitting a combined 26 doubles, 10 home runs and 48 RBIs in 109 games.

In 2001, he set a career high with 28 doubles for Beloit, batting .277 with 14 home runs and 48 RBIs in 106 games. He logged his final year in the Milwaukee chain in 2002, splitting time with Class-A High Desert Mavericks and Double-A Huntsville Stars. He was a .349 hitter in 12 games in California League, then batted .258 with 7 home runs and 38 RBIs in the Southern League.

=== St. Paul Saints ===
Alfonzo signed a minor league deal with Chicago Cubs in 2003, but was released March 29. Later that season he signed with the St. Paul Saints of the independent Northern League in May. He batted .300 with 15 doubles, 9 home runs and 46 RBI in 68 games with the Saints.

=== Florida Marlins ===
In 2004, Alfonzo was selected to the Florida State League All-Star team during lone campaign in Marlins organization. He batted .281 with 112 hits, 18 home runs and 70 RBIs in 105 games for the Class-A Jupiter Hammerheads.

=== San Francisco Giants ===
He signed with the San Francisco Giants in 2004. He played at the three top rungs of Giants organizational ladder during 2005 season marking his first year in system, seeing action for the Class-A San Jose Giants, the Double-A Norwich Navigators and the Triple-A Fresno Grizzlies. He clubbed a career-high 23 home runs to tie for second most by Giants farmhands, while his .334 average was fifth. In 106 overall games he drove in career-best 79 runs. He was named to Cal League In-Season All Star team after hitting .357 with 13 HRs and 45 RBI for eventual league champion San Jose. He participated in the Venezuela Winter League following the campaign.

After 10 seasons in minor league baseball, Alfonzo debuted with the Giants on June 3, 2006. During his debut, he hit a two-run home run against the New York Mets for his first major league hit. Three days later, he caught pitcher Jason Schmidt's 16-strikeout game, which matched a 102-year-old Giants franchise record.

Alfonzo filled in for veteran catcher Mike Matheny, who was sidelined with symptoms following a concussion for the rest of the 2006 season. He hit .266 with 12 home runs, 39 RBIs and .465 slugging percentage in 87 games with the Giants. He again played in the Venezuelan Winter League. On June 3, 2006, Alfonzo made his big league debut. In his debut, his name was misspelled on his jersey (it should have ended in "zo," not "so"). Alfonzo hit a two-run shot in the sixth inning that ultimately won the game against the Mets. The following day, the jersey was still misspelled.

In 2007, he batted a combined .325 with three homers and 15 RBIs in 23 games between Arizona League Giants and Triple-A Fresno. He had three homers and 10 RBIs in 18 games for the Grizzlies after batting .462 in five contests for AZL Giants. He hit .250 with a homer and six RBIs in 26 Major League games. Alfonzo drove in a career-best three runs against the Philadelphia Phillies on May 4.

He batted .321 with eight homers and 45 RBIs in 56 games between the Class-A Augusta GreenJackets, Double-A Connecticut and Triple-A Fresno. He went 1-for-11 with an RBI in five games with San Francisco, he lost the competition for the backup catcher position and was sent back down to Triple-A.

On May 1, 2008, Alfonzo was suspended for 50 games for testing positive for a performance-enhancing substance in violation of Major League Baseball's Joint Drug Prevention and Treatment Program. He became a free agent at the end of the season and signed with the San Diego Padres.

=== San Diego Padres ===
Alfonzo signed a minor league contract with the San Diego Padres and was sent to the Triple-A Portland Beavers. He hit .309 with 14 home runs and 36 RBIs with the Beavers before being called up to the Padres.

=== Seattle Mariners ===
On December 14, 2009, Alfonzo signed a minor league contract with the Seattle Mariners. On May 28, 2010, his contract was purchased by the Mariners after Josh Bard was placed on the disabled list. He made his Mariner debut two days later against the Los Angeles Angels of Anaheim, going 3-for-5 with a home run and four RBI. On June 29, the Mariners designated Alfonzo for assignment to make room for Bard, who was coming off the disabled list.

=== Colorado Rockies ===
Alfonzo was signed by the Colorado Rockies as a minor league free agent on January 28, 2011. He was called up to the major leagues on July 15, 2011, from the Rockies' Triple-A affiliate, the Colorado Springs Sky Sox. On the day of his debut, the first at bat for the Rockies was a home run.

In September 2011, Alfonzo became the second major league player (Manny Ramirez was the first) to be suspended 100 games for a second positive drug test. Alfonzo appealed and managed to get the suspension overturned for procedural reasons.

=== Los Angeles Dodgers ===
Alfonzo signed a minor league contract with the Los Angeles Dodgers on January 10, 2013. He had received an invite to Major League camp, but contracted Dengue fever in his native Venezuela during the offseason. Since he was not allowed to fly to spring training, the Dodgers rescinded the Major League camp invite but kept him on his minor league contract. The Dodgers eventually loaned Alfonzo out to the Diablos Rojos del México in the Mexican League. He hit .374 with 21 homers and 60 RBI in México before rejoining the Dodgers organization and being assigned to the Triple-A Albuquerque Isotopes, where he played in 19 games and hit .284 with three home runs and 14 RBI. Alfonzo elected free agency following the season on November 4.

=== Guerreros de Oaxaca ===
On May 9, 2014, Alfonzo signed with the Guerreros de Oaxaca of the Mexican League. In 78 appearances for Oaxaca, Alfonzo slashed .292/.332/.492 with 16 home runs and 59 RBI.

=== Diablos Rojos del México ===
On April 15, 2016, Alfonzo signed with the Diablos Rojos del México of the Mexican League. In 69 appearances for the Diablos, he batted .342/.369/.559 with 14 home runs, 54 RBI, and two stolen bases. Alfonzo was released by the team on July 8.

=== Saraperos de Saltillo ===
On July 14, 2016, Alfonzo signed with the Saraperos de Saltillo of the Mexican League. In 16 appearances for Saltillo, he hit .382/.434/.853 with nine home runs and 26 RBI. Alfonzo was released by the Saraperos on April 2, 2017.

== Coaching career ==
On May 28, 2025, the Leones de Yucatán of the Mexican League hired Alfonzo as a coach. On July 29, Alfonzo was promoted to the role of manager following the firing of Oswaldo Morejón. On October 30, he was relieved of his position and reassigned as a coach, with Sergio Omar Gastélum taking over.

== Personal ==
Alfonzo has two sons who have played professional baseball, Omar is in the Pittsburgh Pirates organization and Eliézer Jr. is on the Los Angeles Dodgers. Both his wife and his daughter were killed when a hotel they were staying at collapsed during the 2026 Venezuela earthquakes.

== See also ==
- List of Major League Baseball players from Venezuela
