= Noah Lowry =

American baseball player (born 1980)

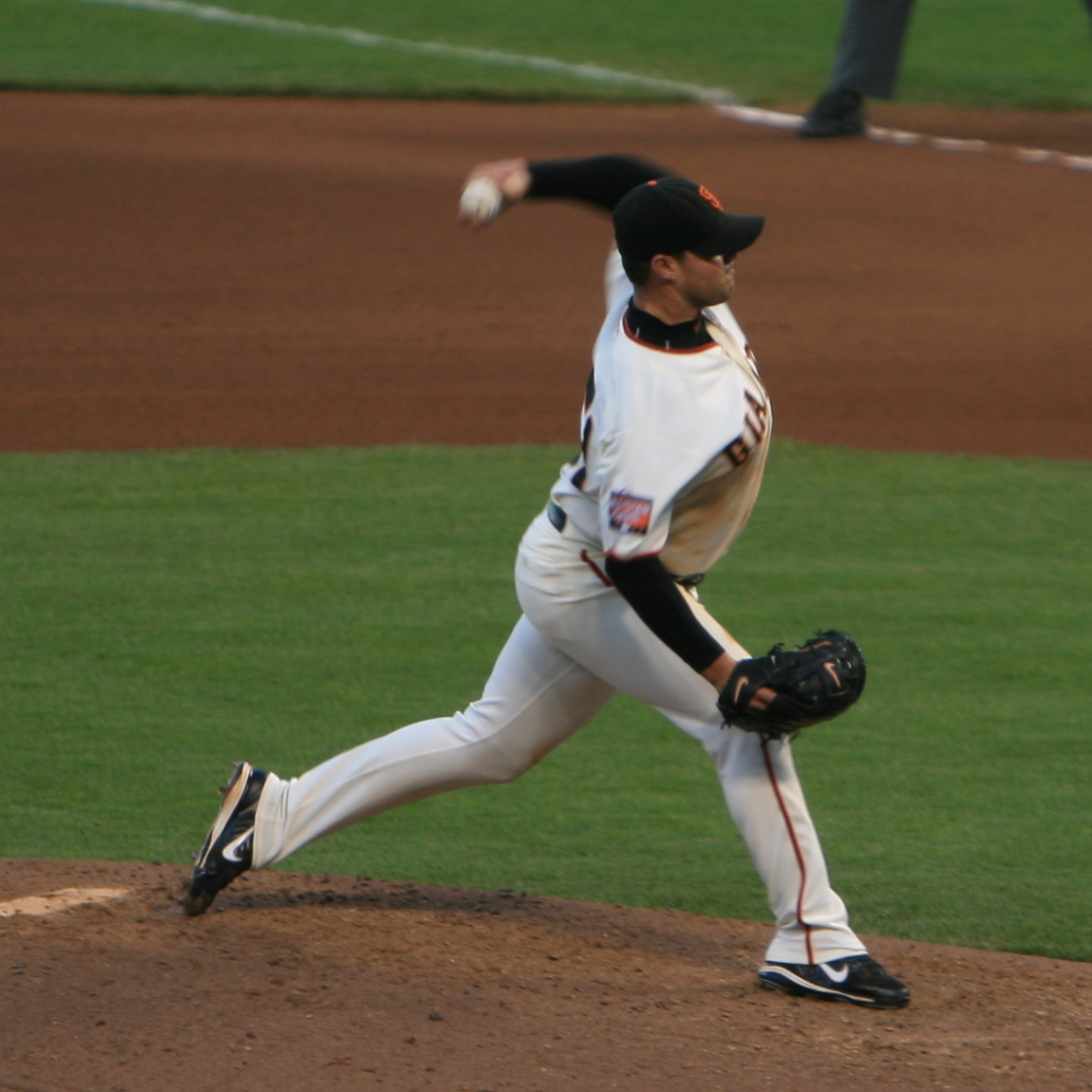
- Lowry with the Giants in 2007
- Pitcher
- Born: October 10, 1980 (age 45); Ventura, California, U.S.
- Batted: Right Threw: Left

MLB debut
- September 5, 2003, for the San Francisco Giants

Last MLB appearance
- August 29, 2007, for the San Francisco Giants

MLB statistics
- Win–loss record: 40–31
- Earned run average: 4.03
- Strikeouts: 420
- Stats at Baseball Reference

Teams
- San Francisco Giants (2003–2007)

Noah Ryan Lowry (born October 10, 1980) is an American former professional baseball pitcher. He played in Major League Baseball (MLB) for the San Francisco Giants from 2003 to 2007.

== College and the MLB draft ==
Lowry was first drafted out of Nordhoff High School, in Ojai, California, by the Texas Rangers in the nineteenth round of the 1999 MLB draft, but instead opted to attend Pepperdine University. At Pepperdine, Lowry went 14–2 with a 1.71 ERA as a junior. In 2001, the San Francisco Giants drafted Lowry with the 30th and last pick of the first round in the 2001 MLB draft.

== Major league career ==
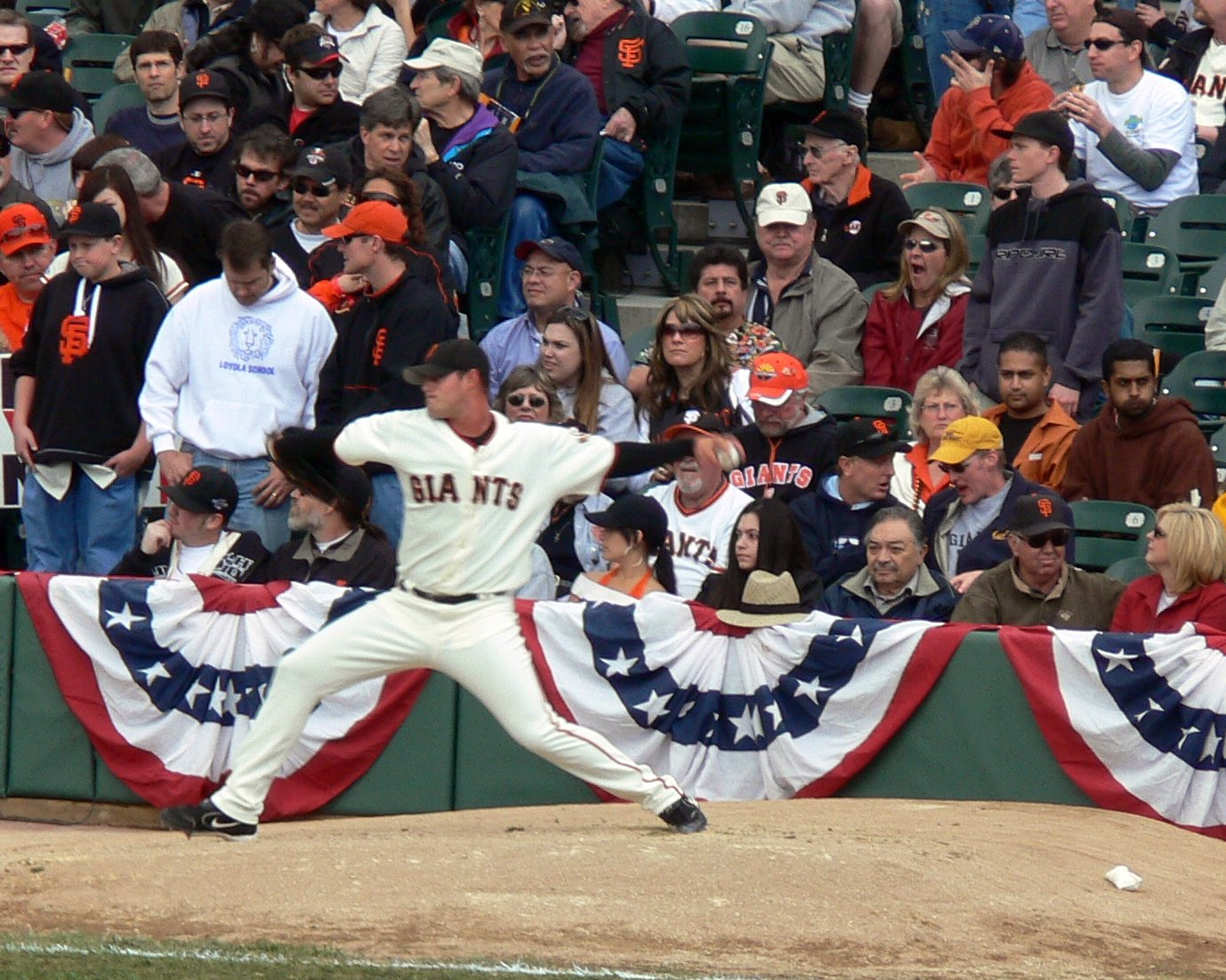
Lowry in bullpen

Following a September call-up in 2003, Lowry enjoyed a very successful partial rookie year for the Giants in 2004, going 6–0, and finishing with a 3.82 ERA in fourteen starts. He was named the National League's Player of the Week for the week of August 9. With an early victory to start off the 2005 season, Lowry began his career with a 7–0 record, the longest winning streak for any pitcher in San Francisco Giants history (and the second longest in Giants franchise history, behind Hooks Wiltse's 12–0 start in 1904).

Lowry got eighteen starts before the 2005 Major League Baseball All-Star Game and compiled a 2.43 ERA after the break. His best month came in August, when he went 5–0 with a 0.69 ERA, earning him Pitcher of the Month honors. He finished the season with a 13–13 record, 3.78 ERA, and 172 strikeouts in 204 2/3 innings.

Prior to the 2006 season, the Giants signed Lowry to a four-year deal with an option for a fifth year, valued at $9.25 million. At the time, it was the second largest contract for a pitcher with only one full season of big league service. Lowry received a $1 million signing bonus and $385,000 salary for 2006. The contract guaranteed him totals of $1.115 million for 2007, $2.25 million for 2008, and $4.5 million for 2009. The contract included a 2010 option for $6.25 million that would have been activated automatically if a certain number of starts, innings, and Cy Young Award vote placements was achieved. The 2010 option also included another $1.5 million in incentives.

Injuries hampered his performance right from the beginning of the 2006 season. In his first start of 2006, Lowry was removed from the game in the second inning due to an oblique strain, forcing him to miss the first month of the season. Lowry also suffered from an elbow injury in September.

Despite a losing season for the Giants in 2007, and a season cut short by a forearm injury, Lowry won a career-high 14 games, the most for any pitcher on the Giants staff. He finished the season with a 14–8 record and a 3.92 ERA.

Lowry was slated as the number three starter for the Giants in 2008, but the forearm injury that shut him down in 2007 kept him out of the 2008 season. After having trouble throwing strikes early on in spring training, Lowry was diagnosed with exertional compartment syndrome and had surgery on his left forearm on March 7. In September 2008, he also had an arthroscopic procedure to remove a bone spur from his left elbow.

In May 2009 Lowry had a rib surgically removed to relieve the continued pain in his shoulder and neck associated with his recent diagnosis of thoracic outlet syndrome. The new diagnosis brought the original diagnosis of exertional compartment syndrome into question, along with the necessity of his 2008 surgery. Lowry's agent, Damon Lapa, claimed that the Giants' medical staff had misdiagnosed the injury and subjected Lowry to an unnecessary arm operation, turning a potential short-term recovery into a lengthy medical ordeal. Lapa said Dr. James Andrews and Dr. Greg Pearl confirmed the diagnosis in separate consultations with Lowry. Lapa said the circulatory issue was the source of Lowry's forearm tightness in August 2007 and loss of control in spring training 2008, but that the Giants' medical staff failed to identify the problem. The Giants, however, denied any wrongdoing.

As of February 2010, Lowry was working out under the direction of noted personal trainer Brett Fischer at Fischer Sports Physical Therapy & Conditioning in Phoenix.

== Personal life ==
In a February 28, 2013 interview on Chronicle Live, Lowry stated, "It doesn't look like baseball is going to be in my future," and gave viewers a status update of his still-deteriorating health, his young family, his current career as an entrepreneur and ecology advocate, and his love for the San Francisco Giants and baseball in general.

Lowry lives in Santa Rosa, California, and he is the father of daughters Averlee and Anniston. An avid outdoorsman and sportsman, he was co-owner of Santa Rosa Ski & Sports, which has since closed.

Preceded by Andy Pettitte	National League Pitcher of the month August 2005	Succeeded by Andy Pettitte
