= Daniel Ortmeier =

American baseball player (born 1981)

- First baseman / Outfielder
- Born: May 11, 1981 (age 45); Chattanooga, Tennessee, U.S.
- Batted: Switch Threw: Left

MLB debut
- September 5, 2005, for the San Francisco Giants

Last MLB appearance
- May 29, 2008, for the San Francisco Giants

MLB statistics
- Batting average: .255
- Home runs: 6
- Runs batted in: 24
- Stats at Baseball Reference

Teams
- San Francisco Giants (2005–2008)

Daniel David Ortmeier (born May 11, 1981) is an American former Major League Baseball outfielder and first baseman. He made his major league debut on September 5, 2005, with the San Francisco Giants.

== High school ==
Ortmeier was born in Chattanooga, Tennessee, and played baseball at Lewisville High School in Lewisville, Texas. He was drafted by the White Sox in the 27th round out of high school, but opted to play for Coach Clay Gould at UT Arlington. He was redrafted in the 3rd round his collegiate junior year by the SF Giants and signed. His brother, Chris, was drafted by the Cubs out of high school, but went on to pitch at Navaro and Texas Tech.

== Professional career ==
In his Double-A campaign in 2005, he hit 20 home runs with 35 stolen bases. He made his major league debut on September 5, 2005, with the Giants. Ortmeier started off 2006 with the Triple-A Fresno Grizzlies. He was called up briefly to the Giants and then returned to Triple-A. He struggled with a knee and a wrist injury, he finished the year with the Double-A Connecticut Defenders.

Ortmeier had knee surgery prior to the 2007 season, but was fully recovered by spring training. He was assigned to the Grizzlies for the start of the 2007 season, but was called up to the Giants twice. Ortmeier switched from playing outfield to first base due to the Giants' glut of outfielders. On September 7, he hit a walk-off home run to beat the Los Angeles Dodgers at AT&T Park.

Ortmeier competed for the starting first base job in 2008 spring training, but lost the competition to Rich Aurilia. At the request of the team, Ortmeier gave up switch hitting in favor of batting exclusively from the right side. In 2007, he batted .240 at the Triple-A level as a left-handed hitter. On April 9, 2008, Ortmeier batted as a right-handed hitter against a right-handed pitcher for the first time since 2002 and hit a game winning RBI double against Heath Bell. In August 2008, he went back to switch-hitting.

On January 14, 2009, he signed a minor league contract with the Colorado Rockies. In November 2009, Ortmeier was granted free agency.
