= Connecticut Defenders =

- 1995–2009; Norwich, Connecticut
Team logo
Cap insignia

Minor league affiliations
- Class: Double-A (1995–2009)
- League: Eastern League (1995–2009)
- Division: Northern Division

Major league affiliations
- Team: San Francisco Giants (2003–2009); New York Yankees (1995–2002)

Minor league titles
- League titles: 2002
- Division titles: 2002; 2009

Team data
- Name: Connecticut Defenders (2006–2009); Norwich Navigators (1995–2005)
- Colors: Black, blue, gray, white, red
- Mascot: Cutter (2006–2009); Tater the Gator (1995–2005)
- Ballpark: Senator Thomas J. Dodd Memorial Stadium (1995–2009)

The Connecticut Defenders were a Minor League Baseball team based in Norwich, Connecticut. The team, which played in the Eastern League, was the Double-A affiliate of the San Francisco Giants major-league club from 2003 until following the 2009 season, when the Defenders relocated to Richmond, Virginia and are now known as the Richmond Flying Squirrels.

The Defenders played in Senator Thomas J. Dodd Memorial Stadium, located in Norwich; opened in 1995, it seats 6,275 fans. The Defenders had been known as the Norwich Navigators from 1995 until October 2005. Prior to the 2003 season, the Navigators had been an affiliate of the New York Yankees.

The Defenders were last managed by Steve Decker, who was announced as the team's new skipper on December 28, 2008.

The Defenders were scheduled to host the Eastern League All-Star Game at Dodd Stadium on July 11, 2007, but the game was ultimately canceled due to fog. The fan activities and home run derby went on as scheduled, with over 6,500 fans attending events throughout the day.

== History ==
On June 3, 1994, the Yankees announced they would move their double-A franchise from Albany, New York, where it had been known as the Albany-Colonie Yankees since 1985, to Norwich, Connecticut, and would be known as the Norwich Navigators. Ground was broken for a new stadium in Norwich on November 3 of that year, and the team began play on April 6, 1995, with a win over Bowie. The home opener occurred 11 days later and was another Navigators victory (this time over Reading).

Norwich reached the Eastern League playoffs four times in six years, with many current or former New York Yankees leading the way. On September 14, 2002, the Navigators won their first and only Eastern League championship with a five-game series victory at home over Harrisburg, under the direction of rookie manager Luis Sojo.

Within weeks, the Yankees announced that they were ending their affiliation with the Navigators and beginning one with the Trenton Thunder. Later that fall, the Giants signed on as the new parent club, effective for the 2003 season.

In 2005, the team was bought by a group led by boxing promoter Lou DiBella. With attendance figures declining, management announced an overhaul of the franchise's image and held a contest during the season allowing the public to select a new name submitted by Robert Schaub of East Hampton, Connecticut. and logo for the franchise. These were unveiled on November 14, and a new mascot (a bald eagle) debuted eight days later. Another contest was held to name the mascot, and on February 11, 2006, "Cutter" was christened.

The "Defenders" name, and the bald eagle mascot, are a reference to the United States Coast Guard Academy located a short drive away in New London, and also to the U.S. submarine base also located nearby in Groton. In 2005, the team sponsored several rallies in support of the sub base after it was placed on the Base Realignment and Closure list. The base was eventually removed from the list.

In September 2008 the San Francisco Giants renewed their PDC with the Defenders until 2010. The following season, the Defenders won the Southern Division title and qualified for the Eastern League playoffs, defeating the New Britain Rock Cats three games to one in the ELDS to advance to the second Eastern League Championship Series in franchise history. However, the Defenders fell short in the end, losing three games to one to the Akron Aeros.

=== Relocation to Richmond ===
On Friday, February 13, 2009 the Norwich Bulletin reported that Virginia businessman Bryan Bostic was interested in purchasing the franchise and relocating the team to Richmond, Virginia in time for the 2010 season.

On Monday, March 16, 2009 the Norwich Bulletin reported that the Norwich City Council unanimously approved a request to transfer the lease on Dodd Stadium to Richmond Baseball Club LC, chaired by Bryan Bostic.

On Wednesday, April 22, 2009, the Richmond Times-Dispatch reported that the Richmond Metropolitan Authority (RMA) signed an agreement with the Richmond Baseball Club LC to allow a professional baseball team to play at The Diamond.

On September 23, 2009, the Eastern League officially announced that the Defenders were leaving Norwich and moving to Richmond, where they would play at The Diamond. After the move, the team was renamed via a name-the-team contest to the Richmond Flying Squirrels.

== Alumni ==
Notable players to pass through the franchise include...

- From years as a Yankees affiliate:
  - catcher Mike Figga (1995)
  - pitcher Ramiro Mendoza (1995)
  - outfielder Rubén Rivera (1995)
  - outfielder Ricky Ledée (1996)
  - outfielder Shane Spencer (1996)
  - outfielder Tim Raines (1996, 1997)
  - pitcher David Cone (1996)
  - pitcher Dwight Gooden (1996)
  - outfielder Darryl Strawberry (1996)
  - third baseman Mike Lowell (1997)
  - pitcher Randy Flores (1999–2001)
  - first baseman Nick Johnson (1999)
  - shortstop Alfonso Soriano (1999)
  - outfielder Marcus Thames (1999–2001)
  - infielder Andy Phillips (2000–02)
  - pitcher Roger Clemens (2002)
  - outfielder Juan Rivera (1999)
- From years as a Giants affiliate:
  - pitcher Matt Cain (2004)
  - pitcher Brad Hennessey (2004)
  - outfielder Brian Horwitz (2006)
  - catcher Justin Knoedler (2004–05)
  - outfielder Dan Ortmeier (2004–06)
  - outfielder Fred Lewis (2005)
  - third baseman Ryan Rohlinger (2008)
  - third baseman Pablo Sandoval (2008)
  - outfielder Nate Schierholtz (2006)
  - pitcher Alfredo Simón (2005)
  - infielder Eugenio Vélez (2007)
  - first baseman Travis Ishikawa (2006–08)
  - shortstop Brandon Crawford (2009)
  - pitcher Madison Bumgarner (2009)

== Season records ==
(Place indicates finish in Northern Division)

- As Norwich Navigators
  - 1995: 70–71 (3rd), manager Jimmy Johnson
  - 1996: 71–70 (3rd), manager Jim Essian
  - 1997: 73–69 (2nd), manager Trey Hillman
  - 1998: 66–76 (4th), manager Trey Hillman
  - 1999: 78–64 (2nd), manager Lee Mazzilli
  - 2000: 76–66 (3rd), manager Dan Radison
  - 2001: 83–59 (2nd), manager Stump Merrill
  - 2002: 76–64 (1st), manager Luis Sojo
  - 2003: 62–79 (6th), manager Shane Turner
  - 2004: 69–74 (5th), manager Shane Turner
  - 2005: 71–72 (3rd), manager Dave Machemer
- As Connecticut Defenders
  - 2006: 64–77 (5th), manager Dave Machemer
  - 2007: 63–78 (5th), managers Dave Machemer (through July 21) and Shane Turner
  - 2008: 68–73 (4th), manager Bien Figueroa
  - 2009: 83–59 (1st), manager Steve Decker

== Playoffs ==
- 1997 season: Lost to Portland, 3–2, in first round
- 1999 season: Defeated Trenton 3–2, in first round; lost to Harrisburg 3–2, in championship round.
- 2001 season: Lost to New Britain, 3–1, in first round
- 2002 season: Defeated New Haven, 3–0, in first round; defeated Harrisburg 3–2 to win Eastern League title.
- 2009 season: Defeated New Britain, 3–1, in first round; lost to Akron 3–1, in championship round.

== See also ==
- Professional baseball in Connecticut
- Sports in New England

Preceded by Albany-Colonie Yankees	New York Yankees; Double-A Affiliate; 1995–2002	Succeeded by Trenton Thunder
Preceded by Shreveport Swamp Dragons	San Francisco Giants; Double-A affiliate 2003–2009	Succeeded by Richmond Flying Squirrels
