= Batkid Begins =

- Theatrical release poster
- Directed by: Dana Nachman
- Written by: Dana Nachman; Kurt Kuenne
- Produced by: Dana Nachman; Liza Meak
- Cinematography: Don Hardy Jr. Naomi Ture
- Edited by: Kurt Kuenne
- Music by: Dave Tweedie
- Production company: KTF Films
- Distributed by: Warner Bros. Pictures; New Line Cinema
- Release dates: January 24, 2015 (Slamdance Film Festival); June 26, 2015 (United States)
- Running time: 87 minutes
- Country: United States
- Language: English
- Box office: $74,709

Batkid Begins is a 2015 American documentary film co-produced (with Liza Meak), co-written (with Kurt Kuenne) and directed by Dana Nachman. The documentary follows Miles Scott, an American child and cancer survivor. His wish was to be "Batkid", a sidekick of the eponymous comic book superhero Batman. Once the request went out, thousands of volunteers, city officials, businesses and supporters rallied to turn San Francisco, California into "Gotham City" – the fictional home city of Batman, on November 15, 2013, for one of the largest and most elaborate Make-A-Wish projects ever staged.

The film was released on June 26, 2015, by Warner Bros. Pictures.

It featured footage shot live by John Crane Films on Batkid Day. John Crane also served as executive producer for the film.

== Cast ==
- Miles Scott as Batkid / Himself
- Eric Johnston as Batman
- Philip Watt as Riddler
- Mike Jutan as Penguin
- Sue Graham Johnston as Damsel in Distress
- Joel Zimei as Lou Seal
- Or Oppenheimer as Catwoman
- Ron Oppenheimer as Superman
- Nick Scott as himself
- Natalie Scott as herself
- Ryan Scott as himself
- Ed Lee as Mayor of San Francisco
- Greg Suhr as Chief of Police
- Naomi Kyle as herself
- Patricia Wilson as Executive Director
- Chris Taylor as Deputy Editor
- Hans Zimmer as himself
- Ama Daetz as Newscaster

== Release ==
The film premiered at the Slamdance Film Festival on January 24, 2015. On March 12, 2015, New Line Cinema acquired the film, with its parent Warner Bros. Pictures distributing. The film was released by Warner Bros. Pictures on June 26, 2015.

== Reception ==
Batkid Begins received positive reviews from critics. On Rotten Tomatoes, the film has a rating of 82%, based on 60 reviews, with a rating of 7.1/10. The site's critical consensus reads, "Sweet and unabashedly sentimental, Batkid Begins is an uplifting look at a selfless act that brought a city together." On Metacritic, the film has a score of 63 out of 100, based on 14 critics, indicating "generally favorable" reviews.
