= Yusmeiro Petit =

Venezuelan baseball player (born 1984)

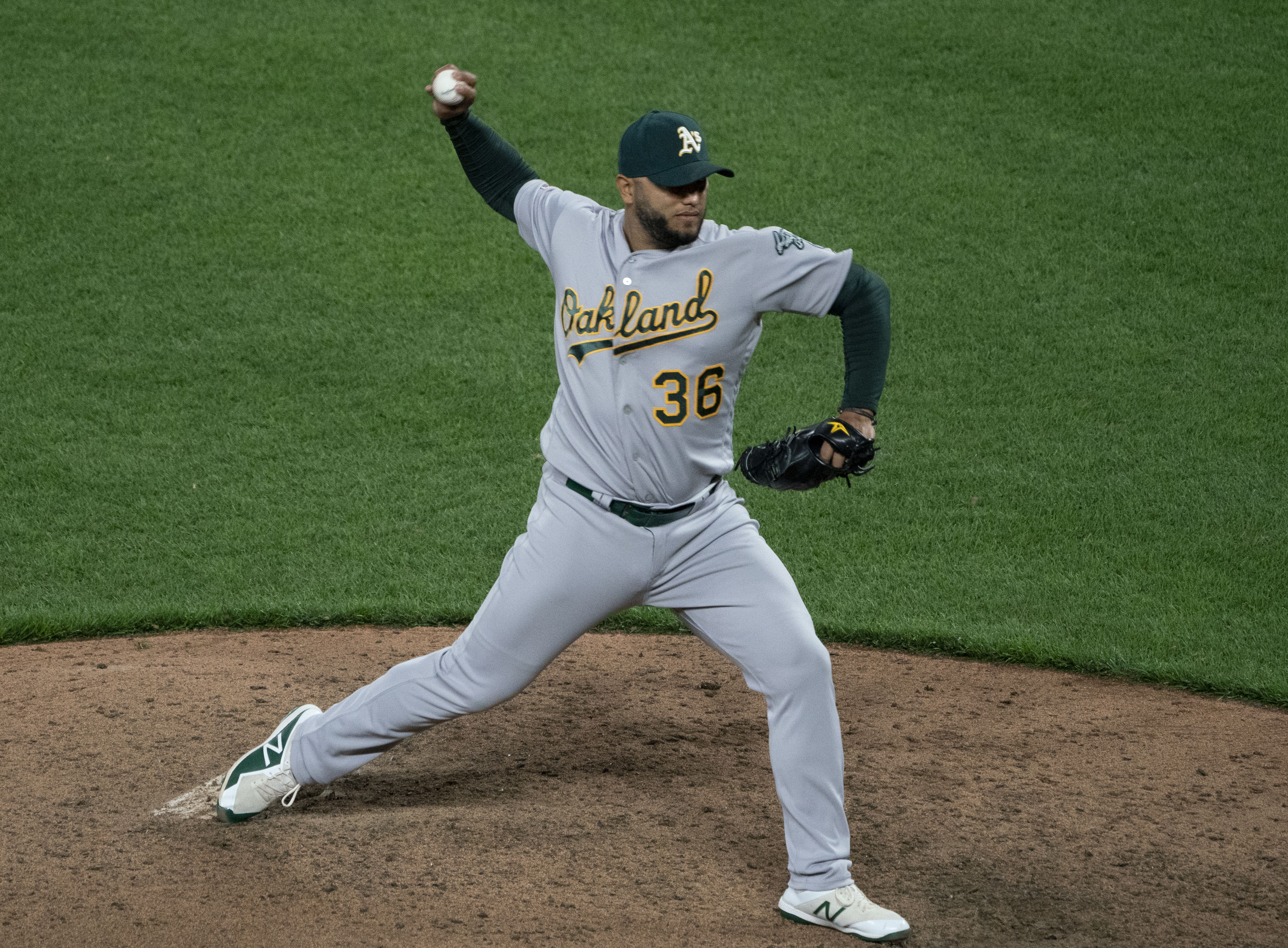
- Petit with the Oakland Athletics in 2019
- Pitcher
- Born: 22 November 1984 (age 41); Maracaibo, Venezuela
- Batted: Right Threw: Right

MLB debut
- May 14, 2006, for the Florida Marlins

Last MLB appearance
- October 1, 2021, for the Oakland Athletics

MLB statistics
- Win–loss record: 50–44
- Earned run average: 3.93
- Strikeouts: 767
- Stats at Baseball Reference

Teams
- Florida Marlins (2006); Arizona Diamondbacks (2007–2009); San Francisco Giants (2012–2015); Washington Nationals (2016); Los Angeles Angels (2017); Oakland Athletics (2018–2021)

Career highlights and awards
- World Series champion (2014)

Yusmeiro Alberto Petit (Spanish pronunciation: [ʝusˈmejɾo alˈβeɾto peˈtit]; born 22 November 1984) is a Venezuelan former professional baseball pitcher. He played in Major League Baseball (MLB) for the Florida Marlins, Arizona Diamondbacks, San Francisco Giants, Washington Nationals, Los Angeles Angels, and Oakland Athletics. In 2014, Petit retired 46 consecutive batters to set a new MLB record.

== Early life ==
Yusmeiro Alberto Petit was born on November 22, 1984, in Maracaibo, Venezuela. As a ten-year-old, Petit competed in the 1994 Little League World Series, representing the championship-winning Coquivacoa Little League team. This was the first time a Venezuelan team had won the LLWS title in eight appearances.

== Professional career ==
=== Minor leagues ===
Petit signed with the New York Mets as an international free agent on 15 November, 2001. He made his professional debut in 2002 with the Venezuelan Summer League where he went 3–5 with 2.43 earned run average (ERA) in 12 games, 11 starts.

In 2003, Petit split the season between the Rookie-Level Kingsport Mets and the Short-Season Brooklyn Cyclones. He finished third in the Appalachian League in strikeouts, fourth in strikeouts per nine innings and fifth in ERA. Petit also placed second in Appalachian League in fewest bases on balls per nine innings and allowed the second fewest runners per nine innings. He was named Pitcher of the Week for the week of 14 to 20 July. He was promoted to Brooklyn of the New York–Penn League on 23 August. He recorded 20 strikeouts in 12 1/3 innings with the Cyclones.

Petit spent time with the Class-A Capital City Bombers, the Class-A Advanced St. Lucie Mets and the Double-A Binghamton Mets during the 2004 season. He finished second among all Minor League pitchers with 200 strikeouts and first in strikeouts per nine innings with a 12.92 clip. Petit received the Sterling Organizational Pitcher of the Year Award as top pitcher in the Mets organization. He began the season at Capital City of the South Atlantic League where he was selected to the Mid-Season All-Star team. He notched 122 strikeouts and walked only 22 walks in 83 innings with the Bombers. He was first in the league in wins and strikeouts before he was promoted to St. Lucie of the Florida State League on 26 July. He had 62 strikeouts in 44 1/3 innings with St. Lucie. He was soon promoted to Binghamton of the Eastern League on 28 August. Petit made two starts for Binghamton and fanned 10 batters in seven innings on 28 August. He pitched 2/3 scoreless innings for the World Team at the 2004 All-Star Futures Game on 11 July in Houston, Texas. He was 4–3 with a 2.15 ERA in 11 starts in the Venezuelan Winter League.

Petit spent time with Binghamton and the Triple-A Norfolk Tides in 2005. He went 9–3 with 2.91 ERA in 21 starts at Double-A, then went 0–3 with 9.20 ERA in three starts with Norfolk after being promoted on 22 August. He made four starts for the Norfolk Tides, including one in the playoffs against the Toledo Mud Hens. He lost all three regular-season starts, allowing 16 runs on 24 hits in 14 2/3 innings. He did however earn a win in the playoff start against Toledo, allowing three earned runs on six hits in eight innings, recording 14 strikeouts. He was named to the Eastern League's mid-season All-Star team and finished second in the league in ERA. He again pitched in the Venezuelan Winter League, going 5–1 with one save and 2.01 ERA in nine games.

In November 2005, the Mets traded Petit along with Mike Jacobs and Grant Psomas for Carlos Delgado.

=== Florida Marlins (2006) ===
Petit made his major league debut on 14 May against the Pittsburgh Pirates, allowing one hit with two strikeouts in one inning. He held the Atlanta Braves scoreless in three innings during second appearance on 17 May at Turner Field, recording a career-high three strikeouts. Petit suffered first major league loss on 19 May against the Tampa Bay Devil Rays, allowing a 10th-inning walk-off home run to Aubrey Huff. He was optioned to the Triple-A Albuquerque Isotopes on 18 June after going 0–1 with 7.36 ERA in seven outings. He was recalled on 4 July, and went 1–0 with a 10.57 ERA in two games before he was optioned back to Albuquerque on 17 July. He was again recalled on 1 September going 0–0 with 11.74 ERA in final six appearances of season. He made his first major league start and earned first major league win on 5 July against the Washington Nationals. He appeared in 15 games, one start, with the Marlins, going 1–1 with 9.57 ERA during his three major league stints. He pitched primarily out of bullpen, going 0–1 with 10.18 ERA in 14 outings as a reliever.

=== Arizona Diamondbacks (2007–2009) ===
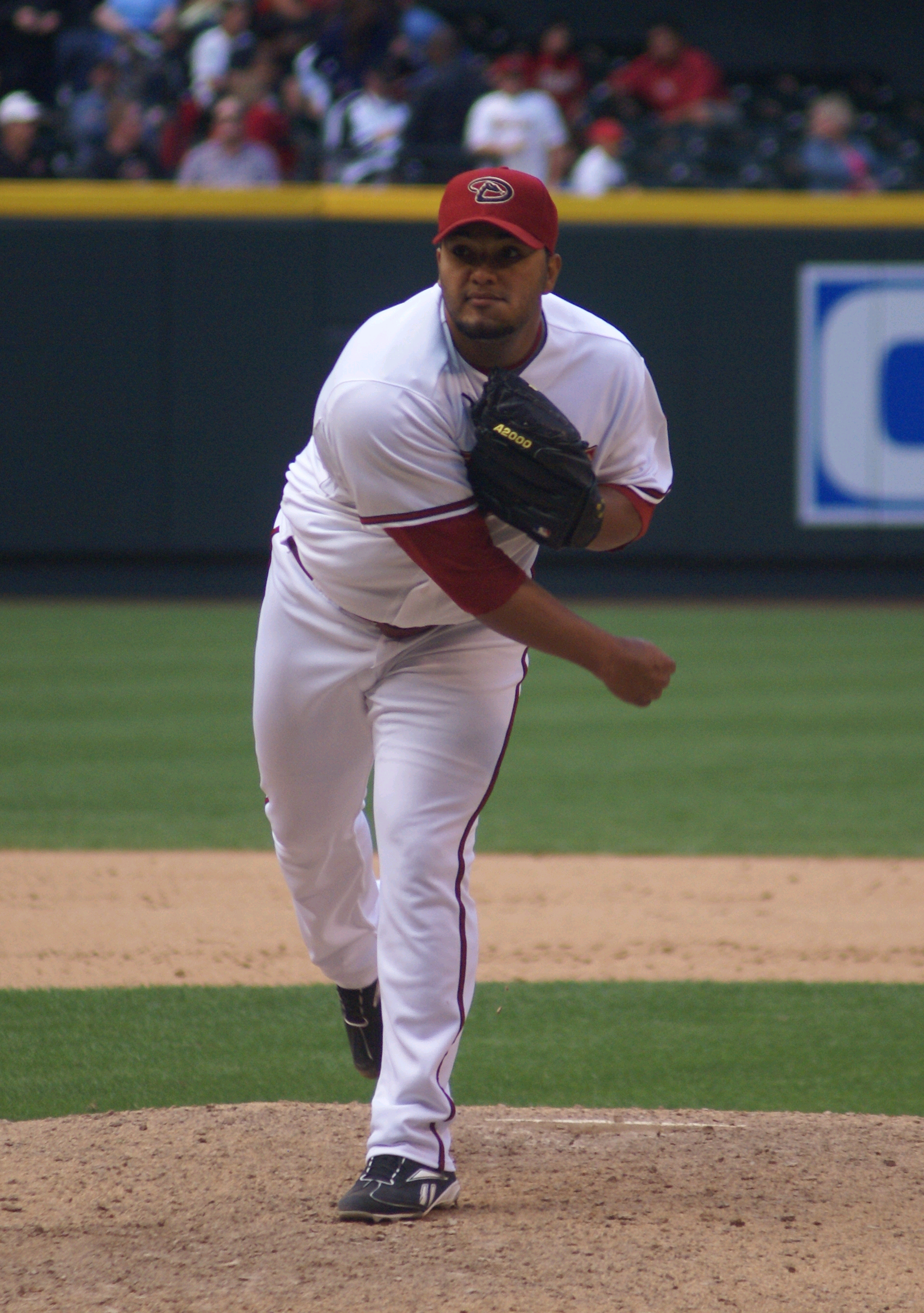
Petit pitching for the Arizona Diamondbacks in 2009

Petit was traded to the Arizona Diamondbacks on 26 March, 2007, for Jorge Julio. He picked up his first win for the Triple-A Tucson Sidewinders on 15 April against the Colorado Springs Sky Sox, tossing six innings, allowing two earned runs off six hits with five strikeouts. He was recalled on 22 April and made his Diamondbacks debut that night against the San Francisco Giants, allowing two runs over seven innings in the loss. He earned wins in five of his next six starts, going 5–0 with a 2.21 ERA. He earned his first win for the Diamondbacks on 3 July against the St. Louis Cardinals, allowing one run over 51/3 innings.

Going into the 2009 season, Petit was the likely candidate for the fifth starter role in the pitching rotation or a long-relief role, out of the bullpen. He started the season in the major leagues for the first time in his career and posted a 0–1 mark with a 4.70 ERA in six relief appearances before being optioned to Tucson on 27 April. He made 11 starts for the Sidewinders, going 3–3 with a 4.80 ERA. Petit was recalled on 27 June and remained in the Majors for the remainder of the season. He made his first start of the season for the D-backs on 2 July and earned a no-decision in a 4–3 loss against the Milwaukee Brewers after allowing only one run on two hits with four strikeouts in six innings. He held opposing batters to a .216 batting average for the season, including a .213 average as a starter. In 2009, Petit was mainly a spot starter for the Diamondbacks rotation and went 3–5 with a 4.31 ERA in 19 games, of which eight were starts.

On 4 August, 2009, Petit took a no-hitter into the eighth inning against the Pittsburgh Pirates before it was broken up in the eighth with a single by Ronny Cedeño. It was the only hit he allowed in eight innings. He finished the season 3–10 with a 5.82 ERA in 23 games, of which 17 were starts.

=== Seattle Mariners ===
Petit was claimed off waivers by the Seattle Mariners on 5 November, 2009. He was designated for assignment on 6 February 2010. On 9 February, Petit cleared waivers and was sent to Triple-A. On 17 March, he was released by the team. However, he re–signed to a minor league deal 10 days later.

In 2011, Petit played for the Oaxaca Warriors of the Mexican League.

=== San Francisco Giants (2012–2015) ===
Petit signed a minor league contract with the San Francisco Giants for the 2012 season. He made his Giants debut as the starting pitcher on 23 September, in place of Tim Lincecum, in a move to rest the regular rotation, since the Giants had clinched the NL West division title the day before. Petit allowed 2 runs and 7 hits in 4 2/3 innings in that effort; he was not the pitcher of record in a Giants loss. The Giants won the 2012 World Series over the Detroit Tigers and although Petit was not on the playoff roster, he did receive a ring.

Petit began 2013 with the Triple–A Fresno Grizzlies, but on 23 July, he was called up to help the pitching staff during a double-header. He pitched in the first game of the double-header after Eric Surkamp had a poor start. In 5 1/3 innings, he struck out 7 and gave up 2 runs. On 28 July, he was designated for assignment. Petit subsequently cleared waivers and was sent back to Fresno. He was recalled by the Giants on 23 August, as a starter.

On 6 September 2013, making just his third major league start of the year since joining the rotation as an injury replacement, Petit came within one strike of pitching a perfect game against his former team, the Arizona Diamondbacks. It was broken up on a single by pinch hitter Eric Chavez on a 3-2 count with two outs in the ninth inning. Petit would get the following out, finishing the game with 7 strikeouts and no walks on 95 pitches. The Giants won that game 3–0. The game was Petit's first career complete game and shutout. He was the 12th pitcher in MLB history to lose a perfect game with two outs in the 9th inning.

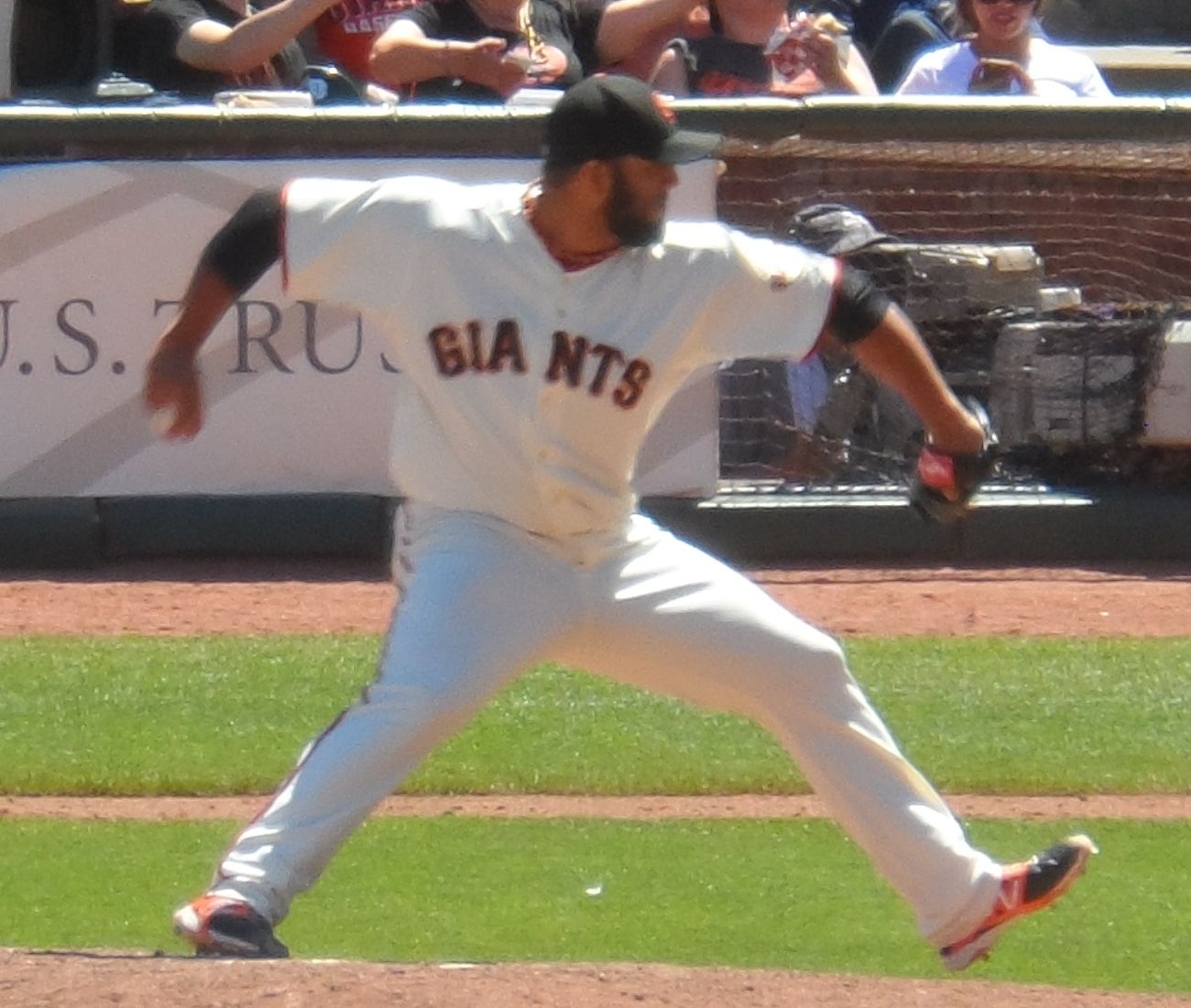
Petit pitching for the San Francisco Giants in 2014

During the 2014 season, Petit worked mostly in relief, with occasional starts. Making a spot start in place of the injured Matt Cain on 22 July and giving up five runs (increasing his season ERA to 4.11), Petit recorded the last out of the fifth inning and subsequently proceeded to post six consecutive perfect relief appearances, of lengths varying from 1 to 4 1/3 innings, totalling 38 consecutive retired batters. On 28 August, Petit returned to the Giants starting rotation in place of Tim Lincecum and set down the first eight Colorado Rockies to set a new MLB record for consecutive batters retired at 46 (over a period of eight games), breaking the record of 45 formerly held by Mark Buehrle. Buehrle's streak included his perfect game and the starts before and after. Buehrle had broken a 1972 record of 41 consecutive retired batters that had been set by Jim Barr over the course of two complete-game wins, from the third inning of one to the seventh inning of the next; Barr's mark had been tied in 2007 by Bobby Jenks over the course of 14 relief appearances. He also broke Buehrle's record for consecutive perfect innings pitched by 0.1 with 15 1/3. After giving up a third-inning double to opposing pitcher Jordan Lyles to snap the streak, Petit proceeded to complete six innings, allowing four hits and a run, to record the win and reduce his season ERA to 3.44.

In the Giants' 18-inning victory over the Washington Nationals in the second game of the 2014 National League Division Series, Petit pitched 6 shut-out innings in relief to get the win, as Brandon Belt hit the game-winning home run in the 18th.

In Game 4 of the 2014 National League Championship Series, Petit pitched three scoreless innings in relief of Ryan Vogelsong that gave the Giants time to erase a 4–1 deficit.

With the Giants' victory over the Kansas City Royals to secure the 2014 World Series title, Petit won his second world championship. He also became the only non-American professional baseball player to win both the Little League World Series and the MLB World Series.

Petit made 42 appearances for San Francisco in 2015, compiling a 3.67 ERA with 59 strikeouts across 76 innings pitched. On 2 December 2015, Petit was non–tendered by the Giants and became a free agent.

=== Washington Nationals (2016) ===
The Washington Nationals announced on 14 December 2015, that he accepted a one-year deal with an option for a second year, which was declined. On 7 April, against the Miami Marlins, he made his Nationals debut.

=== Los Angeles Angels (2017) ===
On 8 February 2017, the Los Angeles Angels signed Petit to a minor league contract with an invitation to spring training. On 30 March, he was added to the opening day roster. On 5 April, he made his Angels debut against the Oakland Athletics.

=== Oakland Athletics (2018–2021) ===
On 7 December 2017, Petit signed a two-year contract with the Oakland Athletics which includes a club option for 2020. Petit finished his first season with the A's with a 7–3 record and an even 3.00 ERA over 93 innings. He continued his success the following season, registering an ERA of 2.71 in 80 games, prompting the Athletics to exercise their option on him. In the shortened 2020 season, Petit recorded a 1.66 ERA in 21 2/3 innings.

On 14 February 2021, Petit resigned with the Athletics on a 1-year contract worth $2.55 million. In 2021, Petit logged 78 games of 3.92 ERA ball, striking out 37 in 78.0 innings of work. He became a free agent following the season.

=== San Diego Padres ===
On 2 May 2022, Petit signed a minor league contract with the San Diego Padres organization. In 11 games for the Triple-A El Paso Chihuahuas, he struggled to a 7.71 ERA with 12 strikeouts in 11 2/3 innings pitched. On 10 June, Petit was granted release from the Padres.

== International career ==
Petit was selected to play for the Venezuela national baseball team at the 2017 World Baseball Classic. He took the loss after allowing 5 runs in two innings, including a three-run home run to Esteban Quiroz, against Mexico.

On 29 October 2018, he was selected as one of the MLB All-Stars during the 2018 MLB Japan All-Star Series

== See also ==
- List of Major League Baseball individual streaks
- List of San Francisco Giants team records
- List of Major League Baseball players from Venezuela
