= Pick of the Litter (TV series) =

2019 American documentary television series

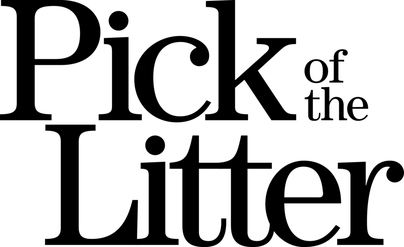
- Genre: Docuseries
- Based on: Pick of the Litter by Dana Nachman
- Developed by: Dana Nachman; Don Hardy
- Composer: Dave Tweedie
- Country of origin: United States
- Original language: English
- No. of seasons: 1
- No. of episodes: 6

Production
- Executive producers: Don Hardy; Dana Nachman; Mary Celenza; Josh Braun; Dan Braun
- Running time: 30 min
- Production companies: KTF Films; Submarine Deluxe; ABC Studios

Original release
- Network: Disney+
- Release: December 20, 2019 – January 24, 2020

Pick of the Litter is an American documentary television series by Dana Nachman and Don Hardy for Disney+ based on the 2018 film of the same name, also written and directed by the duo, that began streaming on December 20, 2019.

== Premise ==
The series follows six potential guide dogs named Paco, Pacino, Raffi, Amara, Tulane, and Tartan and how they are nurtured, trained, loved, and shepherded along the way forward potentially changing a blind human companion’s life and working as their guide dog.

== Production ==
In August 2019, Kidscreen reported that Disney+ commissioned a six part series Pick of the Litter inspired by 2018 film of the same name attaching the film's writer-directors Dana Nachman and Don Hardy along with Mary Celenza, Josh Braun and Dan Braun as executive producers with ABC Studios producing the series.

Shortly after the trailer for the film was released, Disney put out an idea to adapt the film into a series and the negotiations began for making the series. When the idea about this series was pitched to Chris Beginner, CEO of Guide Dogs for the Blind, he accepted as it would increase awareness of their organization. Instead of repeating the content of the 2018 film, the directing duo decided to instead focus on the transition period from getting the puppies from puppy raiser homes to the twelve weeks of guide dog training by focusing on a specific litter.

As the production didn't want to disturb the training process, they used smaller camera on a gimbal that then went onto a monopod that could be flipped upside down. Another challenge they had faced was the question of whether the puppy raisers would be willing to open their homes for the documentary crew.

== Episodes ==
No.	Title	Directed by	Original release date
1	"Meet the Dogs"	Don Hardy	December 20, 2019
Focuses on the six puppies and their puppy raisers and the bond between them. It also focuses on how the dogs undergo the evaluations to become guide dogs for the blind before advancing to professional training.
2	"Off to Puppy College"	Don Hardy	December 27, 2019
Focuses on how the puppies are recalled to the guide dog facility for their training and their medical tests at the center. It also touches on how visually impaired individuals can opt for a guide dog.
3	"Training Begins"	Dana Nachman	January 3, 2020
Focuses on how the puppies are trained as guide dogs, including undergoing testing with their trainer blindfolded. It also focuses on how puppies selected for breeding undergo distraction and other testing.
4	"Next Level Training"	Don Hardy	January 10, 2020
Focuses on advanced levels of training from phase three to phase seven, where guide dogs in training have to use all their skills to pass the test in phase eight. It also focuses on the match-making process between dogs and clients.
5	"Meet Your Match"	Don Hardy	January 17, 2020
The dogs in advanced training take their final exams in the hopes of being matched with clients.
6	"Together at Last"	Don Hardy	January 24, 2020
The graduating dogs meet with their puppy raisers before they go home with their new partners.

== Release ==
The first episode premiered on Disney+ on December 20, 2019 with the following episodes debuting weekly on Fridays. The series was removed from Disney+ on May 26, 2023.

=== Marketing ===
The first poster and trailer for the show were released on November 19, 2019.

== Reception ==
Allie Gemmil of Collider declared that Pick of the Litter manages to depict the important work accomplished by the guide dogs and their trainers, stating it reveals the pressure experienced across the training process, while finding the series emotional across the bond built between the puppy raisers and the dogs. Joel Keller of Decider stated that the series captures the tension experienced by the trainers and the dogs through the training process, found that the documentary manages to explain precisely how important the training process is, and why the selection of the dogs has a key role, while praising the diversity of the puppy raisers. Joyce Slaton of Common Sense Media rated the series 4 out of 5 stars, stating: "There's a lot of love flowing between humans in this series, and trainers and everyone else who comes in contact with the dogs treats them with heartwarming compassion, playing with them and petting them in between training sessions. The nature of training means that trainers will only have dogs for a limited period of time, and the moments when they have to return the dog to the program or give them to a client are painful; we see crying and hear about how difficult it is to say goodbye."
