= List of San Francisco Giants team records =

The San Francisco Giants are a Major League Baseball (MLB) franchise based in San Francisco, California. The team was originally formed in 1883 as the New York Gothams, then the club was renamed the New York Giants in 1885. 75 years later, in 1958, the franchise moved to its current day city, San Francisco. Through the 2017 season, the Giants have played 20,528 games, winning 11,015, and losing 9,513 for a winning percentage of approximately .537. This list documents the superlative records and accomplishments of team members during their tenures as Gothams or Giants.

== Table key ==
Table key
RBI	Run(s) batted in
ERA	Earned run average
OPS	On-base percentage plus slugging percentage
*	Tie between two or more players/teams
†	National League record
§	Major League record

== Regular season ==
=== Individual career records ===
Career batting records
Statistic	Player	Record	Giants career	Ref
Batting average	Bill Terry	.341	1923–1936	
On-base percentage	Barry Bonds	.477	1993–2007	
Slugging percentage	Barry Bonds	.666	1993–2007	
OPS	Barry Bonds	1.143	1993–2007	
Runs	Willie Mays	2,011	1951–1952; 1954–1972	
Plate appearances	Willie Mays	12,015	1951–1952; 1954–1972	
At bats	Willie Mays	10,477	1951–1952; 1954–1972	
Hits	Willie Mays	3,187	1951–1952; 1954–1972	
Total bases	Willie Mays	5,907	1951–1952; 1954–1972	
Singles	Willie Mays	1,898	1951–1952; 1954–1972	
Doubles	Willie Mays	504	1951–1952; 1954–1972	
Triples	Mike Tiernan	162	1887–1899	
Home runs	Willie Mays	646	1951–1952; 1954–1972	
Grand slams	Willie McCovey	16†	1959–1973; 1977–1980	
RBI	Mel Ott	1,860	1926–1947	
Bases on balls	Barry Bonds	1,947	1993–2007	
Intentional base on balls	Barry Bonds	575	1993–2007	
Strikeouts	Willie Mays	1,436	1951–1952; 1954–1972	
Stolen bases	Mike Tiernan	428	1887–1899	
Games played	Willie Mays	2,857	1951–1952; 1954–1972	
All-Star Games	Willie Mays	23	1951–1952; 1954–1972	

Career pitching records
Statistic	Player	Record	Giants career	Ref
Wins	Christy Mathewson	372†	1900–1916	
Losses	Christy Mathewson	188	1900–1916	
Win–loss percentage	Sal Maglie	.693	1945, 1950–1955	
ERA	Christy Mathewson	2.12	1900–1916	
Saves	Robb Nen	206	1998–2002	
Strikeouts (New York)	Christy Mathewson	2,504	1900–1916	
Strikeouts (San Francisco)	Juan Marichal	2,281	1960–1973	
10+ strikeout games	Tim Lincecum	36	2007–2015	
Shutouts	Christy Mathewson	79	1900–1916	
Games	Gary Lavelle	647	1974–1984	
Innings	Christy Mathewson	4779 2/3	1900–1916	
Games started	Christy Mathewson	551	1900–1916	
Games finished	Gary Lavelle	369	1974–1984	
Complete games	Christy Mathewson	434	1900–1916	
No-hitters	Christy Mathewson	2*	1900–1916	
No-hitters	Tim Lincecum	2*	2007–2015	
Perfect games	Matt Cain	1	2005–2017	
Walks	Amos Rusie	1,588	1890–1898	
Hits allowed	Christy Mathewson	4,204	1900–1916	
Wild pitches	Mickey Welch	222	1989–1998	
Hit batsmen	Amos Rusie	103	1890–1898	

=== Individual single-season records ===
Single-season batting records
Statistic	Player	Record	Season	Ref(s)
Batting average	Bill Terry	.401	1930	
Home runs	Barry Bonds	73^{§}	2001	
Grand slams	Sid Gordon	3	1948	
Grand slams	Willie McCovey	3	1967	
Grand slams	Jeff Kent	3	1997	
RBI	Mel Ott	151	1929	
Runs	Mike Tiernan	147	1889	
Hits	Bill Terry	254†*	1930	
Singles	Bill Terry	177	1930	
Doubles	Jeff Kent	49	2001	
Triples	George Davis	27	1893	
Stolen bases	John Montgomery Ward	111	1887	
At bats	Jo-Jo Moore	681	1935	
Hitting streak	George Davis	33	1893	
Slugging percentage	Barry Bonds	.863^{§}	2001	
Extra-base hits	Barry Bonds	107†	2001	
Total bases	Barry Bonds	411	2001	
On-base percentage	Barry Bonds	.609^{§}	2004	
OPS	Barry Bonds	1.422^{§}	2004	
Walks	Barry Bonds	232^{§}	2004	
Intentional walks	Barry Bonds	120^{§}	2004	
Strikeouts	Bobby Bonds	189	1970	
Games started	Jose Pagan	164	1962	
Games played	Jose Pagan	164	1962	

Single-season pitching records
Statistic	Player	Record	Season	Ref
Wins	Mickey Welch	44	1885	
Losses	Amos Rusie	34	1890	
Strikeouts (New York Right-handed pitcher)	Mickey Welch	345	1884	
Strikeouts (New York Left-handed pitcher)	Cy Seymour	239	1898	
Strikeouts (San Francisco Right-handed pitcher)	Tim Lincecum	265	2008	
Strikeouts (San Francisco Left-handed pitcher)	Madison Bumgarner	251	2016	
ERA	Christy Matthewson	1.14	1909	
Earned runs allowed	Bill Carrick	187	1899	
Hits allowed	Mickey Welch	528	1884	
Shutouts	Christy Mathewson	11	1908	
Saves	Rod Beck	48*	1993	
Saves	Brian Wilson	48*	2010	
Games	Julián Tavárez	89*	1997	
Games	Jim Brower	89*	2004	
Starts	Mickey Welch	65	1884	
Complete games	Mickey Welch	62*	1884	
Complete games	Tim Keefe	62*	1886	
Innings	Mickey Welch	557 1/3	1884	
Consecutive batters retired	Yusmeiro Petit	46^{§}	2014	
Consecutive perfect innings pitched	Yusmeiro Petit	15.1^{§}	2014	

=== Team all-time records ===
Team all-time records
Statistic	Record
Home runs	13,613
Runs	91,801
Hits	177,770
Batting average	.264
ERA	3.55
Runs allowed	84,439

=== Team single-season records ===
Batting statistics; pitching statistics

Team season batting records
Statistic	Record	Season
Home runs	241	2021
Runs	959	1930
Hits	1,769	1930
Doubles	314	2004
Triples	105	1911
Batting average	.319	1930
Total bases	2,628	1930
Stolen bases	347	1911

Team season pitching records
Statistic	Record	Season
Hits allowed	1,589	1984
Runs allowed	868	1889
Home runs allowed	194*	1996
Home runs allowed	194*	1999
Strikeouts	1,425	2021
ERA	1.72	1885
Shutouts	25	1908

=== Team single-game records ===
From 1901 onwards:

Team game batting records
Statistic	Record	Date	Opponent	Source
Home runs	8	April 30, 1961	Milwaukee Braves	
Runs	26	April 30, 1944	Brooklyn Dodgers	
Hits	31	June 9, 1901	Cincinnati Reds	
Doubles	12	April 11, 1912	Brooklyn Dodgers	
Triples	6	July 30, 1923	Pittsburgh Pirates	
Batting average	.574	August 5, 1922	Chicago Cubs	
Total bases	50	May 13, 1958	Los Angeles Dodgers	

== Postseason ==
- Consecutive postseason series wins - 11 (tie for MLB record with 1998-2001 Yankees)
- Consecutive game wins when facing post-season elimination - 9 (MLB record)

== See also ==
- Baseball statistics
