= Matt Cain =

American baseball player (born 1984)

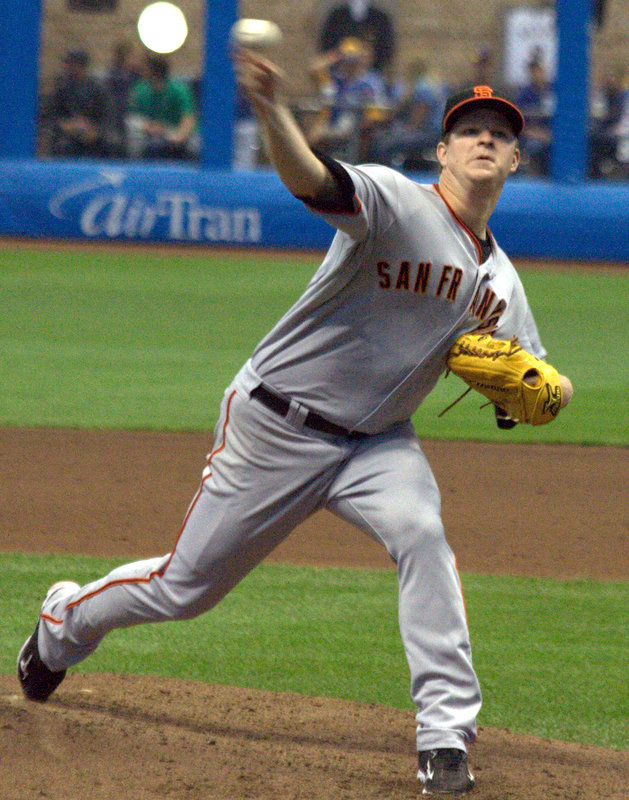
- Cain with the San Francisco Giants in 2011
- Pitcher
- Born: October 1, 1984 (age 42); Dothan, Alabama, U.S.
- Batted: Right Threw: Right

MLB debut
- August 29, 2005, for the San Francisco Giants

Last MLB appearance
- September 30, 2017, for the San Francisco Giants

MLB statistics
- Win–loss record: 104–118
- Earned run average: 3.68
- Strikeouts: 1,694
- Stats at Baseball Reference

Teams
- San Francisco Giants (2005–2017)

Career highlights and awards
- 3× All-Star (2009, 2011, 2012); 2× World Series champion (2010, 2012); Pitched a perfect game on June 13, 2012; San Francisco Giants Wall of Fame

Matthew Thomas Cain (born October 1, 1984) is an American former professional baseball pitcher who played his entire Major League Baseball (MLB) career for the San Francisco Giants from 2005 to 2017. A three-time World Series champion and a three-time National League (NL) All-Star, he is widely regarded as a central figure of the Giants' success in the 2010s for his pitching and leadership.

The Giants drafted Cain out of high school in 2002, and he made his MLB debut at age 20 in 2005, becoming the youngest player in the NL that year. In 2009, Cain was named to his first career All-Star team and won the Willie Mac Award. During the 2010 MLB postseason, he did not allow an earned run in any of the three playoff games he pitched in as the Giants won their first World Series since 1954. In 2012, Cain signed a contract extension that, at the time, gave him the most lucrative contract ever received by a right-handed pitcher in major league history. Cain threw the 22nd perfect game in big league history on June 13, 2012. He had a 16–5 record during the 2012 regular season, finishing sixth in NL Cy Young Award voting. During the Giants' playoff run that led to their victory in the 2012 World Series, the team won every series-clinching playoff game that Cain started.

== Early life ==
Matthew Thomas Cain was born on October 1, 1984, in Dothan, Alabama, to Tom and Dolores Cain. He lived in Vincent, Alabama, for a year when his mother taught at a school nearby. Cain also spent part of his childhood in Germantown, Tennessee, where he attended Houston High School. He took lessons on how to pitch from Mauro Gozzo, who lived near the Cains in Tennessee. As a senior at Houston High School, Cain struck out 83 batters in 62 innings pitched while recording a 1.03 earned run average (ERA). Cain signed a letter of intent to play college baseball for the Memphis Tigers.

== Professional career ==
=== Draft and minor leagues ===
Cain was selected by the San Francisco Giants in the first round (25th overall) in the 2002 Major League Baseball (MLB) Draft. He began his professional career in 2002 with the rookie Arizona League Giants. In eight games (seven starts), he had an 0–1 record, a 3.72 ERA, 20 strikeouts, and 11 walks in 19 1/3 innings pitched.

He spent 2003 with the Hagerstown Suns of the Single-A South Atlantic League. In 14 starts for the Suns, he had a 4–4 record, a 2.55 ERA, 90 strikeouts, and 24 walks in 74 innings pitched.

Prior to 2004, Cain was ranked the number two prospect in the Giants' organization (behind Merkin Valdez) by Baseball America. Cain spent 2004 with two teams. He began the season with the San Jose Giants of the Single-A advanced California League. In 13 starts, he had a 7–1 record, a 1.86 ERA, 89 strikeouts, and 17 walks in 72 2/3 innings pitched. In June, he was promoted to the Norwich Navigators of the Double-A Eastern League. In 15 starts, he had a 6–4 record, a 3.35 ERA, 72 strikeouts, and 40 walks in 86 innings pitched. Cain led Giants' minor league prospects in wins, strikeouts, and ERA; he was named the Giants' Organizational Player of the Year.

Baseball America ranked Cain as the 13th-best prospect in baseball in 2005, as well as the Giants' top prospect. Cain attended spring training in 2005, but he began the season with the Fresno Grizzlies of the Triple-A Pacific Coast League (PCL). In 26 starts, Cain had a 10–5 record and 145 2/3 innings pitched. He finished fifth (tied with R. A. Dickey and Adam Wainwright) in the PCL in wins and fourth with a 4.39 ERA (behind Kevin Jarvis's 3.38, Chris Oxspring's 4.03, and Édgar González's 4.37). He led the league with 176 strikeouts.

=== San Francisco Giants (2005–2017) ===
==== 2005 ====
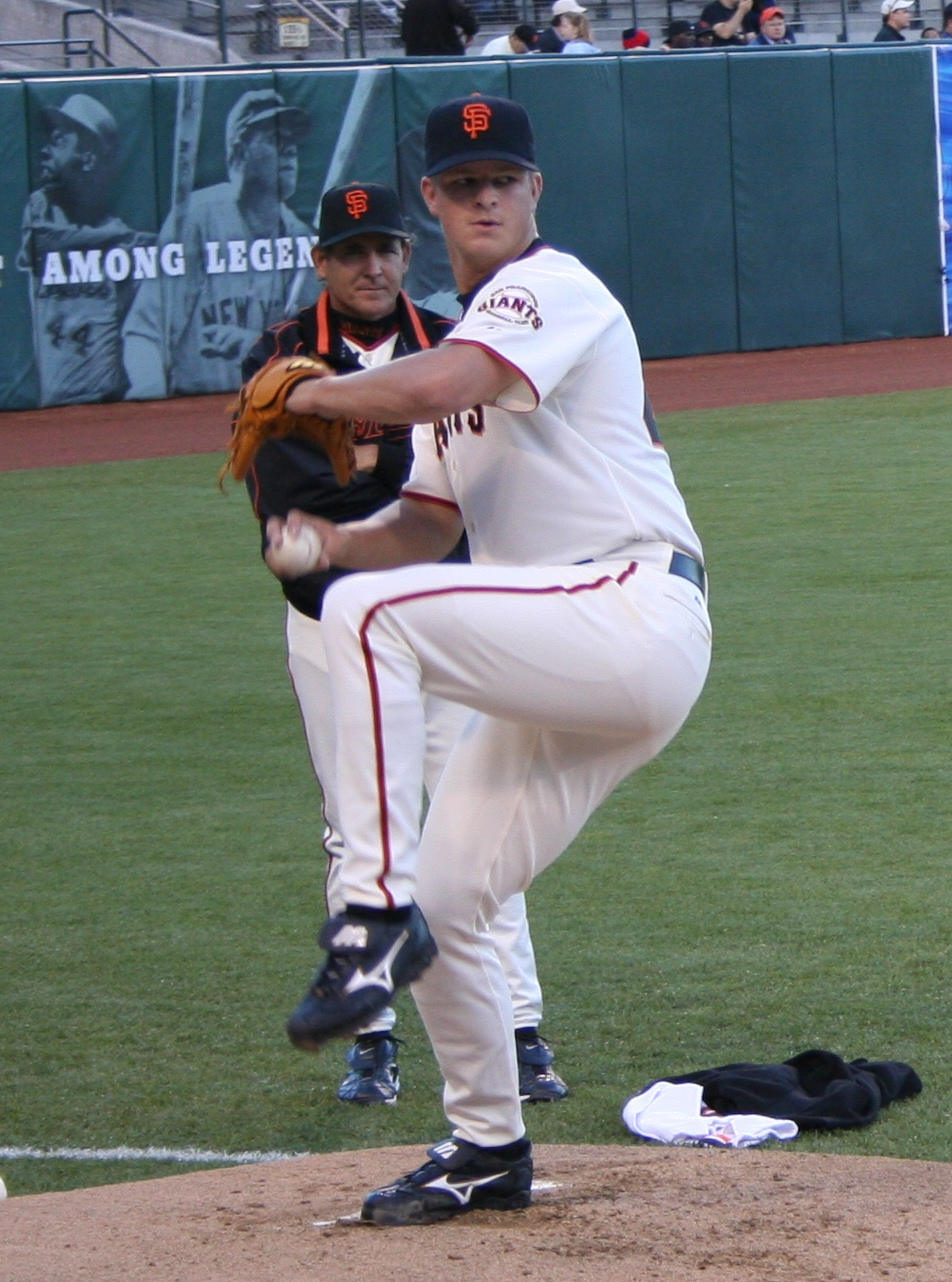
Cain warming up at SBC Park before his major league debut on August 29, 2005, as Dave Righetti looks on. Righetti would be the only pitching coach in Cain's career.

Cain was called up to the Giants on August 26, 2005, to join their rotation. When he was called up, Cain was the second youngest player in the major leagues (Félix Hernández of the Seattle Mariners was the youngest). On August 29 at SBC Park, Cain made his major league debut against the Colorado Rockies at the age of 20. Cain struck out second baseman Luis González looking in the top of the first inning for his first major league strikeout. He gave up only three hits and two runs in five innings but ended up losing the game.

On September 4 at Bank One Ballpark, in a 3–2 win over the Arizona Diamondbacks, Cain allowed one run in seven innings, earning his first major league victory. In his next start on September 9 at home, in a 2–1 win over the Chicago Cubs, Cain struck out a season-high eight batters and notched his first major league complete game, which was also his first major league two-hitter. Leading off the bottom of the seventh inning, Cain hit a 3-2 pitch line drive double to left field off of starting pitcher Jerome Williams for his first career major league hit and double.

Cain finished his first season with seven starts over 46 1/3 innings in which he posted a 2–1 record, 30 strikeouts, a 2.33 ERA, a 0.928 walks plus hits per inning pitched (WHIP), and a minuscule .151 opponent batting average.

==== 2006 ====
Cain's 2005 performance was impressive enough that manager Felipe Alou named him to the team's 2006 starting rotation before spring training began. Cain began the season as the team's fourth starter. Entering the season, he was again ranked as the Giants' top prospect by Baseball America, which also named him the 10th-best prospect in baseball.

In 2006, Cain struggled with consistency, but showed signs of dominance in several starts, flirting with a no-hitter on more than one occasion.

On April 24 at AT&T Park, in a 6–2 win over the New York Mets, Cain did not allow a base runner until the sixth inning.

On May 5 at Citizens Bank Park, in the top of the fourth inning, Cain hit a fly ball single to right field off of Philadelphia Phillies starting pitcher Gavin Floyd for his first career major league single. On May 21 at McAfee Coliseum, in a 6–0 win over the Oakland Athletics, Cain pitched his first career major league complete game shutout and one-hitter.

On June 19 at AT&T Park, in a 2–1 win over the Los Angeles Angels of Anaheim, Cain pitched 7 2/3 innings of no-hit ball before finally surrendering a single to center fielder Chone Figgins and struck out a then-season-high 10 batters, his first career major league double-digit strikeout game.

Two starts later on July 1 at Petco Park, in the first game of a doubleheader against the San Diego Padres, Cain struck out a new season-high 11 batters.

Late in the season, Cain increased his chances for Rookie of the Year consideration with a run of remarkable pitching. On August 6 at AT&T Park, in a 6–2 win over the Colorado Rockies, Cain struck out a season-high and a then career-high 12 batters. Cain also knocked in his first career major league run batted in. In the bottom of the sixth inning, Cain hit a line drive RBI single on the first pitch he saw off of starting pitcher Aaron Cook to center field, scoring first baseman Mark Sweeney, moving third baseman Pedro Feliz to third base and catcher Eliézer Alfonzo to second base, making the score 5–2. From August 17 to September 14, Cain recorded a 5–0 record with an ERA of 0.21. During this streak, he allowed just one earned run in 42 innings—and did not allow an earned run in 30 2/3 innings. He led all National League (NL) rookie pitchers with 13 wins, 179 strikeouts, and 190 2/3 innings pitched in 2006. His 2006 record was 13–12, with a 4.15 ERA. Cain finished in a fifth-place tie with Los Angeles Dodgers rookie outfielder Andre Ethier in the NL Rookie of the Year Award voting.

==== 2007 ====
Cain began 2007 as the Giants' number two starter. In April, he had a 1.54 ERA with 12 hits in 35 innings pitched. On April 22 at AT&T Park, in a 2–1 win over the Arizona Diamondbacks, he pitched a complete game allowing one run (in the ninth) and three hits. It was the third complete game of his young career.

Cain's record through August 3 was 3–12. He had limited opponents to a batting average of .238 against him during that stretch. The Giants scored two or fewer runs in 20 of Cain's first 30 starts. Additionally, the bullpen blew four leads behind him.

Cain went 4–1 over his next five starts. This stretch was bolstered in part by a power surge at the plate by Cain himself. He hit his first and second career home runs in these starts. On August 8 at AT&T Park, in an 5–0 win over the Washington Nationals, Cain hit first career majorlLeague home run, a line drive solo home run to deep left field off of starting pitcher Tim Redding in the bottom of the fifth inning, making the score 3–0. On August 23 at AT&T Park, in an 4–1 win over the Chicago Cubs, Cain hit second home run, a fly ball two-run home run to deep left field off of starting pitcher Carlos Zambrano in the bottom of the sixth inning, scoring catcher Guillermo Rodríguez and making the score 4–0. In September, he had an 0–3 record.

Cain finished the season with the 10th-lowest ERA in the NL at 3.65. He had a 7–16 record; his 16 losses were second in the league (Kip Wells had 17). The Giants went 9–23 in his starts; the bullpen lost leads in five of his starts and the team scored 2 runs or fewer in 21 of his starts. He had 163 strikeouts and 79 walks in 200 innings pitched; he led the league with 12 wild pitches.

==== 2008 ====
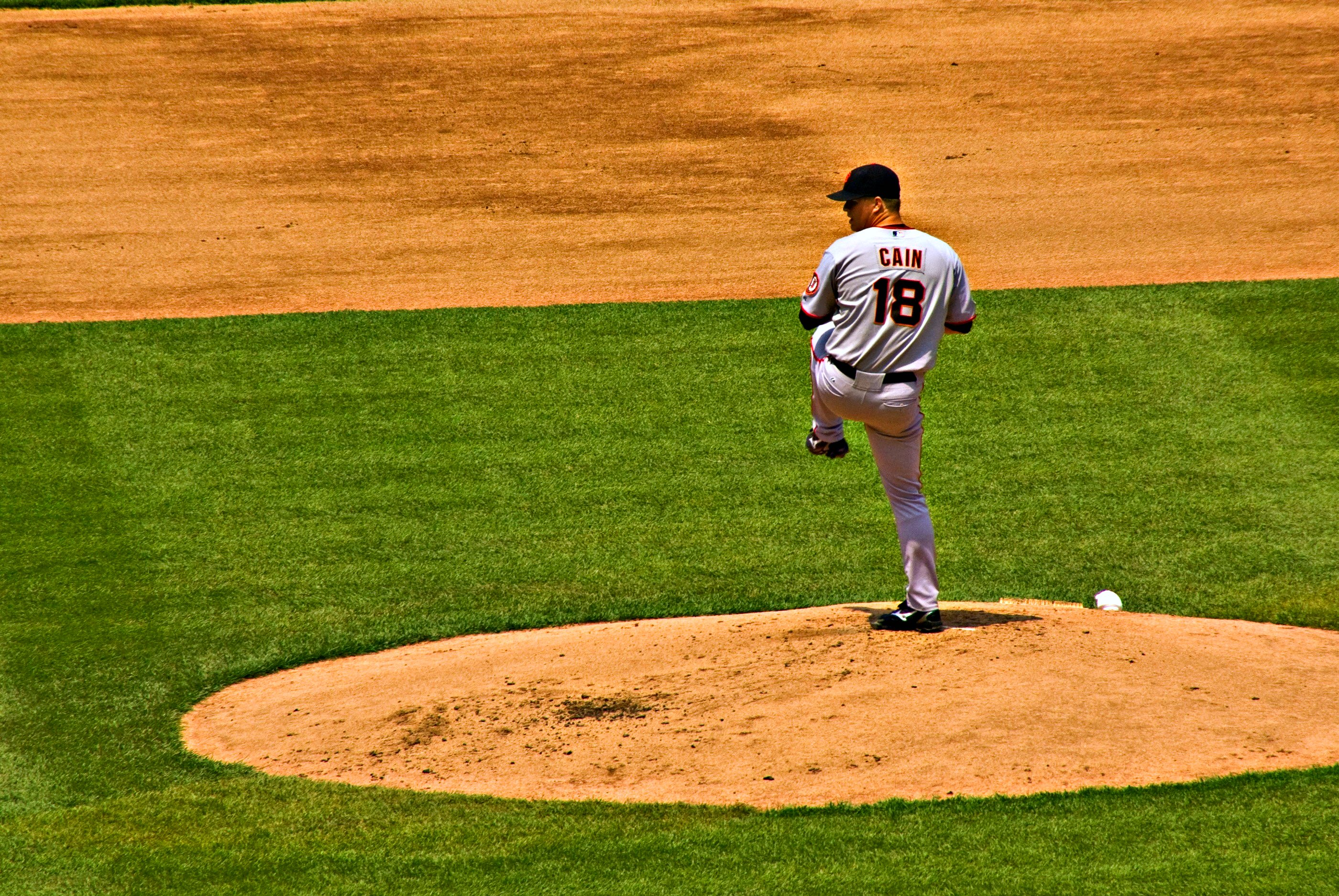
Cain pitching on July 11, 2008, at Wrigley Field against the Chicago Cubs

On April 12, 2008, at AT&T Park, Cain took a no-hitter into the seventh inning against the St. Louis Cardinals before allowing a leadoff double to first baseman and that season's NL MVP Albert Pujols, allowing two runs in 6 2/3 innings. In addition, Cain hit a solo home run on the first pitch he saw to deep left field off of starting pitcher Todd Wellemeyer in the bottom of the sixth inning, breaking a scoreless tie and making the score 1–0. Despite his efforts, he received another no-decision as the Giants lost 8–7 in 10 innings.

On May 13 at AT&T Park, in a 4–2 win over the Houston Astros, Cain allowed two runs in eight innings pitched. He hit a solo home run on the first pitch he saw down the deep left field line off of starting pitcher Brandon Backe in the bottom of the fifth inning, making the score 4–1. On June 14 at AT&T Park, Cain struck out a season-high 11 Oakland Athletics batters while giving up three runs in seven innings. On July 1 at AT&T Park, in a 2–1 win over the Chicago Cubs, Cain struck out 10 batters in eight scoreless innings. On July 24 at AT&T Park, in a 1–0 win over the Washington Nationals, Cain threw a complete game shutout while battling the flu.

Cain went 8–14 with a 3.76 ERA. He had 186 strikeouts (tied with Ricky Nolasco for eighth in the league) and 217 2/3 innings (fifth in the league). His 14 losses were tied for fourth in the league with Johnny Cueto, Backe, Braden Looper, and Zach Duke (behind teammate Barry Zito's and Aaron Harang's 17 and John Lannan's 15); he was one of eight NL pitchers to make 34 starts. Cain's season record was deceiving, as he received the lowest run support in the NL.

==== 2009 ====
Cain was the Giants' number three starter in 2009. On May 17 at AT&T Park, in a 2–0 win over the New York Mets, Cain threw six shutout innings and hit an RBI line drive single off of starting pitcher Mike Pelfrey into short left-center field, knocking in center fielder Aaron Rowand for the final run to make the score 2–0. In his next start on May 23 at Safeco Field, in a 5–1 win over the Seattle Mariners, Cain threw a complete game, allowing just one run. On June 4 at Nationals Park, in the second game of a doubleheader, a 4–1 win over the Washington Nationals, Cain threw a five-inning complete game, allowing one run in the rain-shortened game. On June 14 at AT&T Park, in a 7–1 win over the Oakland Athletics, he allowed one run in a complete game and struck out nine batters. From May 7 through June 14, Cain won seven straight decisions. On July 5, Cain was announced as an All-Star for the first time in his young career. On Cain's final start before the All-Star Game, he was hit by a line drive right below his elbow and was forced to miss pitching for the NL All-Star Team, although he did still attend and was announced as an All-Star. Pittsburgh Pirates starting pitcher Zach Duke replaced Cain on the NL All-Star team. On September 25 at AT&T Park, before a home game against the Chicago Cubs, Cain was named the recipient and 2009 Willie Mac Award winner during a pregame ceremony.

Cain finished the 2009 season with a 14–8 record in 33 starts. He had a 2.89 ERA (seventh in the NL), 171 strikeouts, 73 walks, and 217 2/3 innings pitched (seventh). He was tied for first in complete games thrown (four) with teammate Tim Lincecum. He finished ninth in the league with a .636 winning percentage. He finished the season with a career-high in wins and winning percentage.

==== 2010 ====
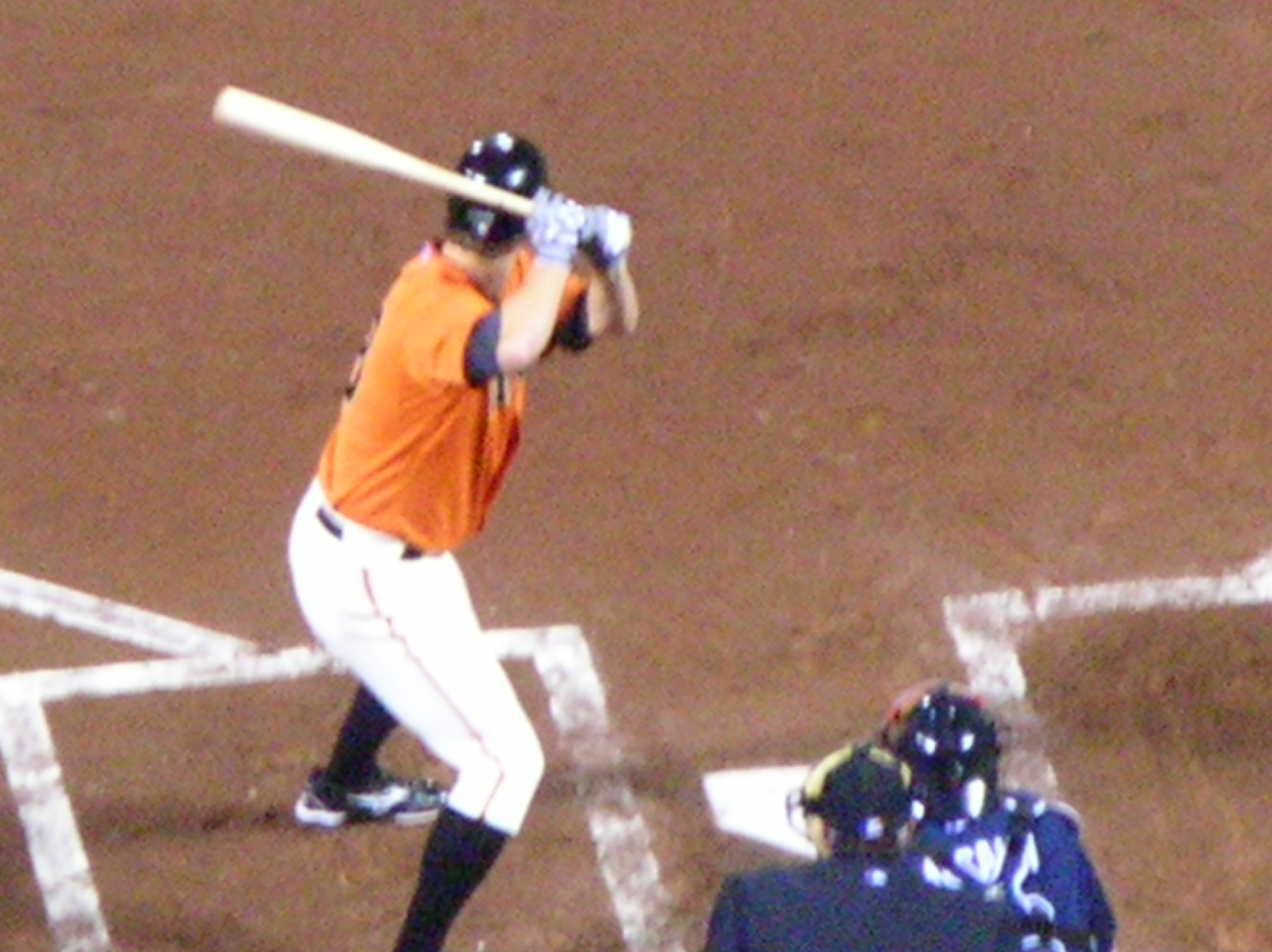
Cain bats during Game 2 of the NLDS.

In 2010, Cain was part of a rotation that included 2008 and 2009 NL Cy Young Award winner Lincecum, 2002 American League Cy Young Award winner Barry Zito, Jonathan Sánchez, and Todd Wellemeyer (who was replaced midseason by Madison Bumgarner).

On May 28 at AT&T Park, in a 5–0 win over the Arizona Diamondbacks, Cain pitched a one-hit complete game shutout. In the top of the second inning, third baseman Mark Reynolds hit a fly ball double to deep center-right field, the only hit Cain allowed. In the month of May, Cain pitched into the sixth inning or later in all six of his starts while giving up nine earned runs on 23 hits with 35 strikeouts and 18 walks in 44 2/3 innings pitched with an overall record of 3–3 and a 1.81 earned run average.

On September 26 at Coors Field, in a 4–2 complete game win over the Colorado Rockies, Cain took a no-hitter into the eighth inning before finally allowing a one-out single to left fielder Jay Payton and wound up allowing only two runs.

For the season Cain was 13–11 with a 3.14 ERA, 177 strikeouts, and 61 walks. He finished sixth in the league with a 1.08 WHIP and 223 1/3 innings pitched. He tied for third with four complete games (tied with Ubaldo Jiménez and Johan Santana behind Roy Halladay's nine and Wainwright's five), including two shutouts (which made him one of seven players in the NL to throw two or more shutouts). He tied for 12th in NL Cy Young Award voting with Bronson Arroyo.

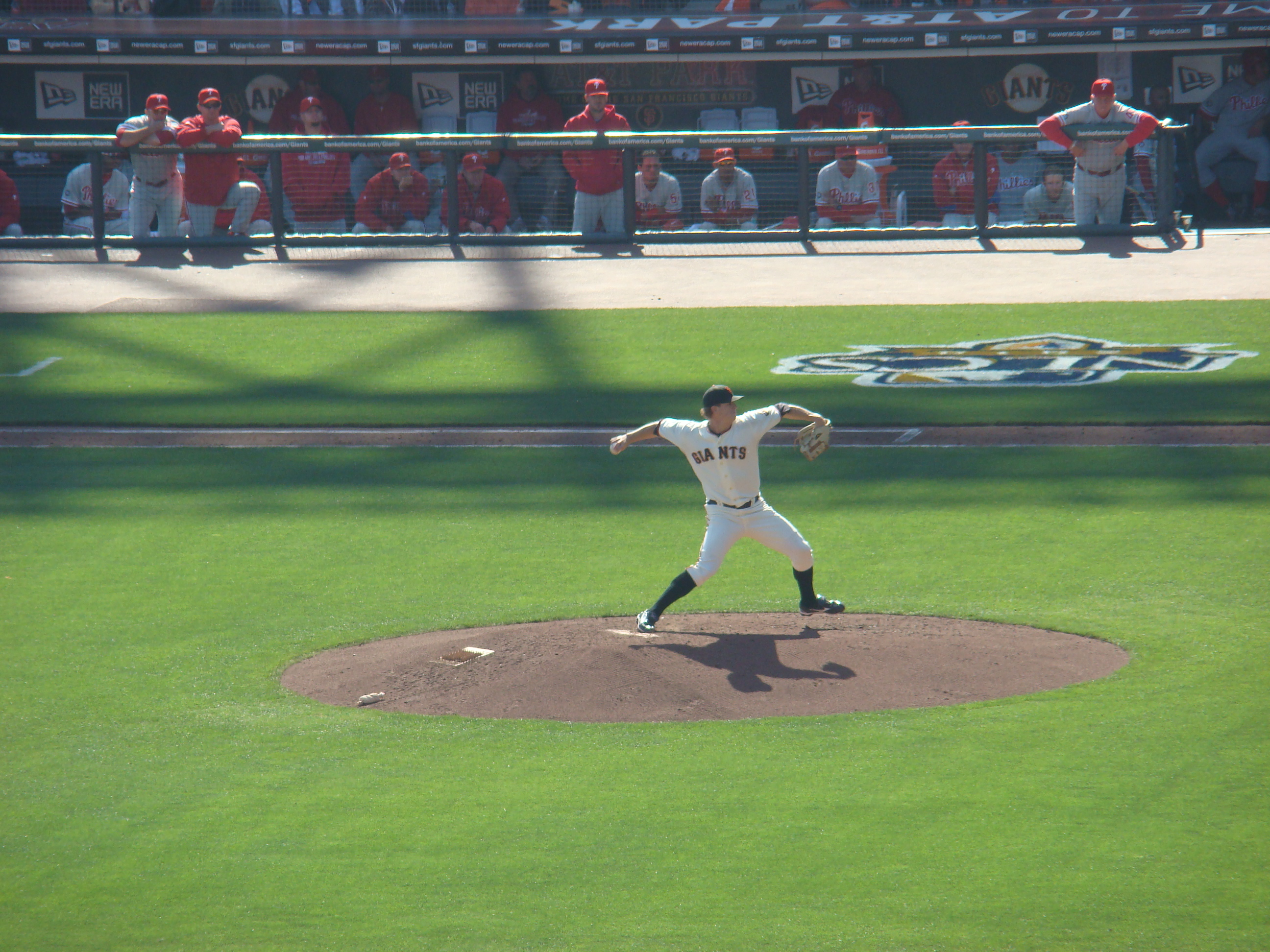
Cain pitching during Game 3 of the NLCS

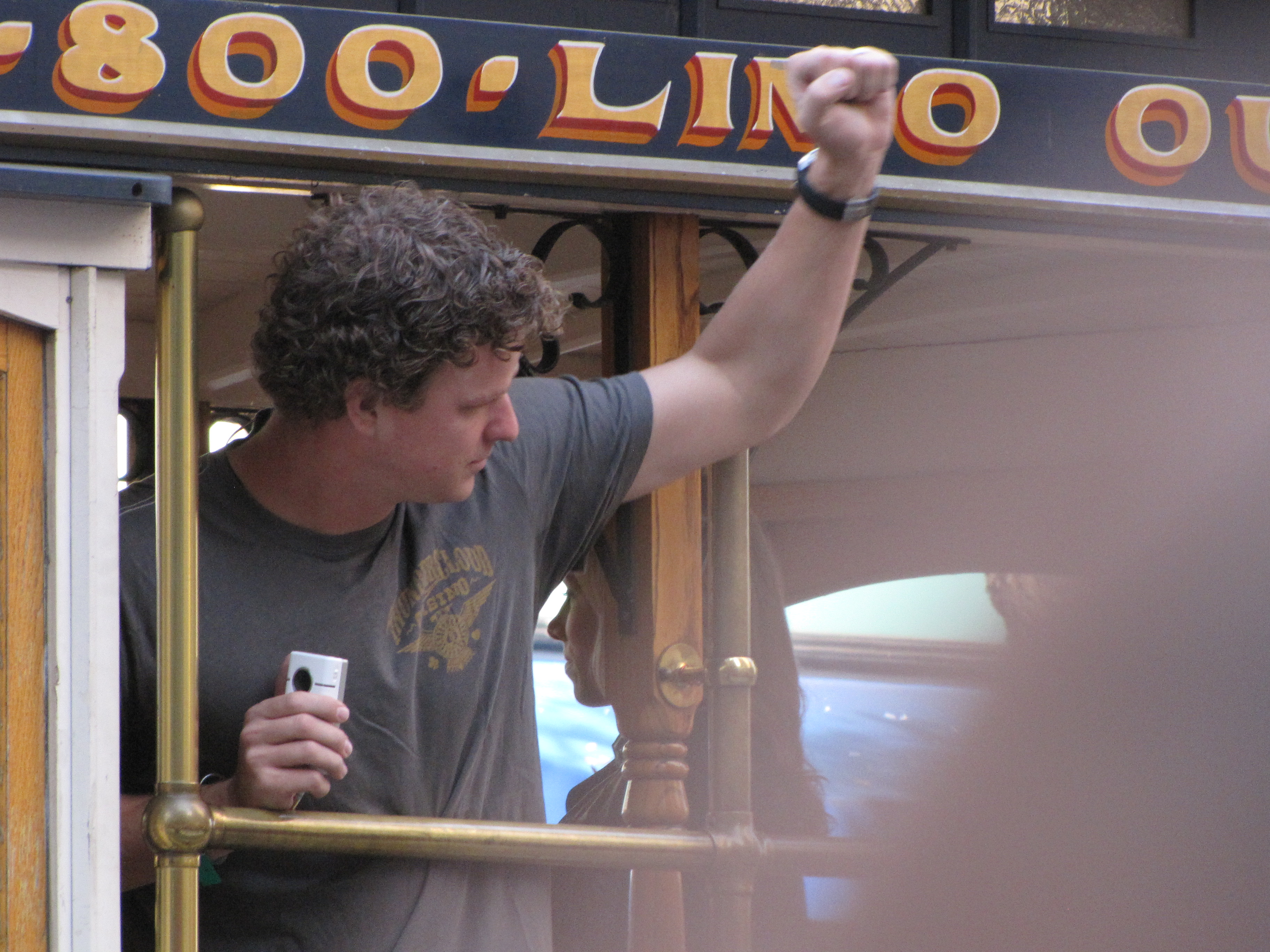
Cain during the Giants' 2010 World Series parade

Cain reached the playoffs for the first time in his career as the Giants won the National League Western Division to reach the playoffs for the first time since 2003. The Giants would play the "Wild Card" in the National League Division Series. On October 8 at AT&T Park, in Game 2 of the 2010 National League Division Series against the Atlanta Braves, Cain allowed one unearned run in 6 2/3 innings in his playoff debut. On October 19 at AT&T Park, in a 3–0 win over the Philadelphia Phillies in Game 3 of the 2010 National League Championship Series, he threw seven shutout innings. The Giants defeated the Phillies in six games. On October 28 at AT&T Park, in a 9–0 win over the American League Champion Texas Rangers in Game 2 of the 2010 World Series, Cain capped an impressive postseason performance by pitching 7 2/3 scoreless innings. He became the fifth pitcher to pitch at least 20 innings in a single postseason without allowing an earned run. His total postseason stats of a 2–0 record, with a 0.00 ERA through 21 1/3 innings pitched helped the Giants win their first championship in San Francisco.

==== 2011 ====
On June 8, 2011, at AT&T Park, in a 3–1 win over the Washington Nationals, Cain threw a complete game, striking out 11, and allowing one run. In the bottom of the sixth inning, Cain hit a line drive RBI double to deep center-right field off of starting pitcher Yunesky Maya, scoring catcher Eli Whiteside and making the score 1–0. On June 25 at AT&T Park, in a 1–0 win over the Cleveland Indians, Cain threw seven shutout innings and at one point retired 14 hitters in a row. In his next start on June 30 at Wrigley Field, Cain struck out Chicago Cubs catcher Koyie Hill looking to start the bottom of the fifth inning for his 1,000th career strikeout, becoming the fifth pitcher in the San Francisco Era to reach the milestone. He again threw seven shutout innings.

He was an All-Star for the second time in his career in 2011; however, he did not appear in the All-Star Game because he started the final regular season game prior to the All-Star contest. He had a 2.64 ERA in 14 starts after the All-Star break but earned just four wins in that stretch. On July 27 at Citizens Bank Park, in a 2–1 win over the Philadelphia Phillies, Cain allowed an unearned run in seven innings. Cain had one strikeout and one walk in the game, ending his Giants' franchise record (since 1900) of 39 consecutive starts with more strikeouts than walks.

On September 18 at Coors Field, in a 12–5 win over the Colorado Rockies, Cain allowed five runs (three earned) in five innings and hit his fifth career home run against starting pitcher Esmil Rogers.

In 33 starts, Cain had a 12–11 record, 179 strikeouts, and 63 walks. His 2.88 ERA was eighth in the league, and his 221 2/3 innings pitched were seventh in the league. He finished eighth in Cy Young Award voting.

==== 2012 ====
On April 2, 2012, Cain agreed to a five-year contract extension worth a guaranteed $112.5 million through 2017 with an option for 2018. Coupled with $15 million he was already scheduled to be paid, the extension made his total contract worth $127.5 million; at the time, this was the largest contract ever received by a right-handed pitcher. Cain earned a $5 million signing bonus, and earned $20 million each season from 2013 to 2017. His $21 million option for 2018 would vest automatically if he was not on the disabled list to an elbow or shoulder injury in 2017 and if he reached 400 innings in 2016 and 2017 combined. If the option failed to vest, the Giants could either pick up the $21 million option or pay a $7.5 million buyout. Cain was scheduled to become a free agent after the 2012 season.

On April 13, pitching the Giants' home opener, Cain threw a complete game shut out, striking out 11. Facing 28 batters in 9 innings, one over the minimum, he allowed a single baserunner on a hit to Pittsburgh Pirates pitcher James McDonald. It was the third one-hitter of Cain's career. In his next start, on April 18, Cain threw another 9 shutout innings using only 91 pitches, dueling Cliff Lee of the Phillies who threw 102 pitches over 10 scoreless innings. The first 9 innings took only 1 hour and 49 minutes. The Giants went on to win in the 11th inning.

Following a dominant first half, Cain was selected to the All-Star Game and was chosen by manager Tony La Russa to be the NL's starting pitcher. On July 10 at Kauffman Stadium, Cain allowed a leadoff single to Derek Jeter before retiring the six remaining hitters he faced; he was the winning pitcher in an 8–0 decision. On July 21, Cain hit his sixth career home run, off of Phillies' pitcher Cole Hamels in the third inning of a 10-inning, 6–5 Giants' victory. Later in that inning, Hamels hit his first career home run off of Cain, making this the first time since 2002 when two pitchers have homered off of each other in the same game and the first in major league history to have occurred in the same inning (Kevin Millwood and Denny Stark were the last to do it).

Cain had a 16–5 record in 2012. He tied with six other players for sixth in the NL in wins, finished fourth with a 2.79 ERA (behind Clayton Kershaw's 2.53, Dickey's 2.73, and Cueto's 2.78), and finished third with 219 1/3 innings pitched (behind Dickey's 233 2/3 and Kershaw's 227 2/3). He finished eighth with 193 strikeouts, joining teammates Bumgarner and Lincecum among the top 10 in the NL in that category. He was one of seven NL players to throw two or more shutouts. Cain finished sixth in NL Cy Young Award voting.

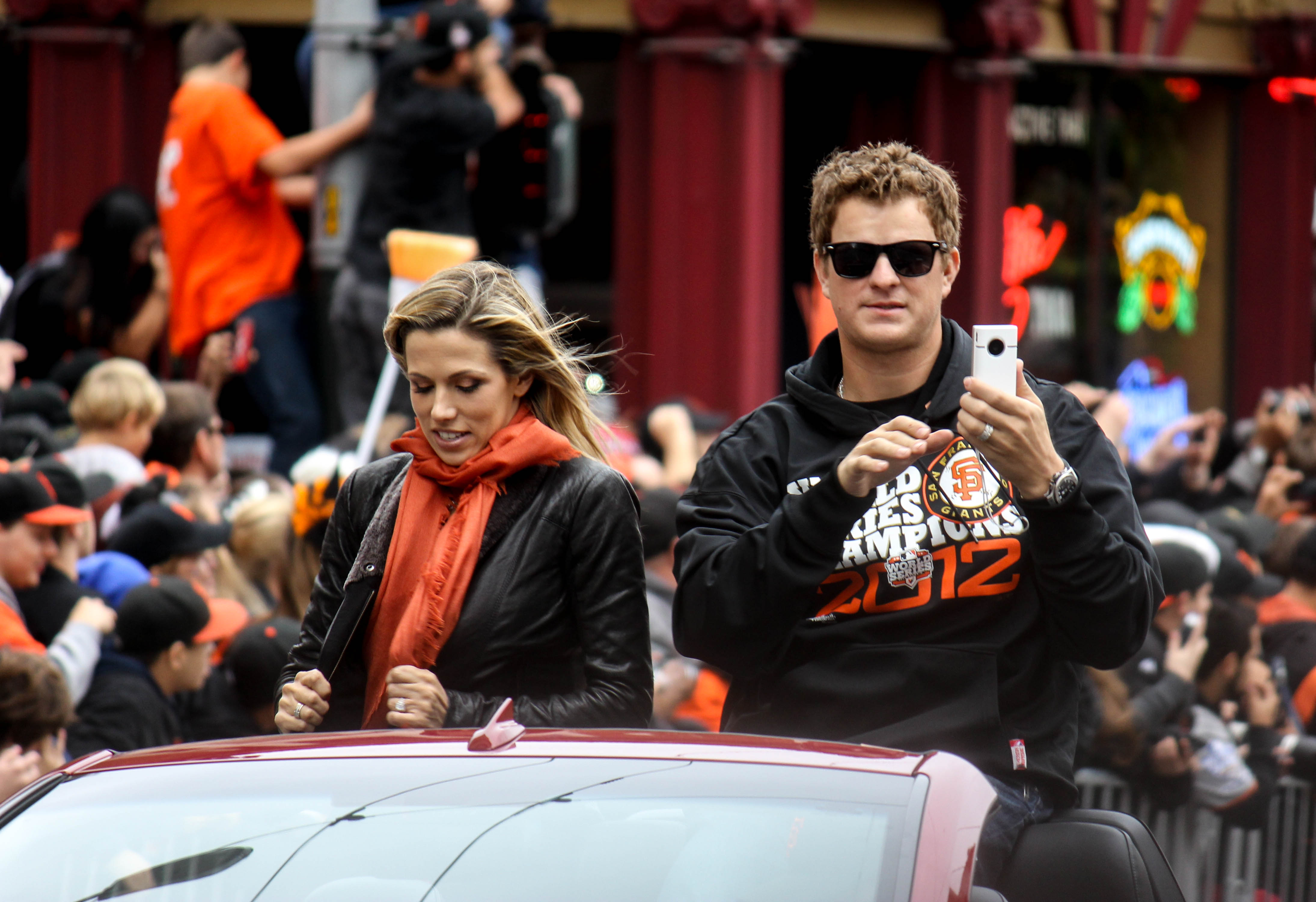
Cain during the Giants' 2012 World Series parade

Cain reached the playoffs for the second time in his career as the Giants won the NL West after missing the playoffs in 2011. In Game 1 of the NL Division Series against the Cincinnati Reds on October 6, he allowed three runs in five innings and took the loss as the Reds defeated the Giants 5–2. In Game 5 on October 11, he began the game with four scoreless innings; Cain would allow three runs over 5 2/3 innings as the Giants won 6–4 to advance to the next round of the playoffs. In Game 3 of the NLCS against the Cardinals on October 17, Cain allowed three runs in 6 2/3 innings and was charged with the loss as the Giants lost 3–1. On October 29, in Game 7, Cain threw 5 2/3 shutout innings and earned the win as the Giants won 9–0, marking the second time in the playoffs that Cain had won a series-clinching game. In Game 4 of the 2012 World Series against the American League Champion Detroit Tigers on October 28, Cain allowed three runs in seven innings, earning a no-decision as the Giants won 4–3 in 10 innings to win the World Series for the second time in three years. During the Giants' playoff run that led to their victory in the 2012 World Series, the team won every series-clinching playoff game that Cain started. In doing so, he became the first and only pitcher in MLB history in a single season to pitch a perfect game and be the winning pitcher in the MLB All-Star Game, LDS, and LCS.

===== Perfect game =====
On June 13, 2012, at AT&T Park, in a 10–0 win over the Houston Astros, Cain threw the 22nd perfect game in MLB history and struck out a career-high 14 batters, tying Sandy Koufax for the most strikeouts in a perfect game. It was the first perfect game for the Giants franchise (first in San Francisco), the ninth in NL history, the fifth no-hitter thrown by MLB pitchers in 2012, and the second of three perfect games of the season, a major league record, after Chicago White Sox pitcher Philip Humber threw one on April 21. Cain threw 125 pitches, the most by a pitcher in a perfect game, and received the second-most run support ever for a pitcher throwing a perfect game. Cain also singled against Rhiner Cruz and scored in the fifth inning. San Francisco Mayor Ed Lee, in recognition of the perfect game, presented Cain with the key to the city and made a proclamation that June 13 every year will be known as "Matt Cain Day". In addition, Cain set a franchise record for a single-game score at 101 and is currently the first and only Giants pitcher to break the 100 barrier.

==== 2013 ====
Cain started on Opening Day for the Giants in 2013. He pitched six shutout innings before being removed due to a high pitch count; however, Kershaw threw a shutout, and the Dodgers beat the Giants 4–0. On April 7, Cain threw two no-hit innings before giving up nine runs in the third inning and getting removed from the game, becoming the first Giants to allow nine runs in an inning since Ernie Shore in 1912. The Cardinals beat the Giants 14–3.

On August 23 against the Pirates, Cain was hit by Gaby Sánchez's line drive in the pitching arm, and was placed on the 15-day disabled list for the first time in his career.

Cain would finish the season with a record of 8–10 in 30 starts. For the first time since 2006, Cain's ERA sat in the 4's, finishing with an exact 4.00 ERA.

==== 2014 ====
On July 4 at Petco Park, Cain struck out San Diego Padres first baseman Tommy Medica looking to end the bottom of the fourth inning for his 1,500th career strikeout, becoming the eighth pitcher in franchise history and the fourth pitcher in the San Francisco Era after Juan Marichal, Gaylord Perry, and Tim Lincecum to reach the milestone.

Cain struggled for the remainder of the season before being sidelined due to elbow difficulties in July, pitching his last game of the season on July 9, 2014. He ended the season with a 2–7 record and a 4.18 ERA. Before undergoing surgery on his right elbow to remove bone chips on August 11, Cain revealed that he had pitched through bone chips for ten years, but that they had never been an issue until then. In late September, Cain underwent surgery on his right ankle to remove a bone spur. The Giants acquired Jake Peavy a few days before the trade deadline to fill in as a starting pitcher and went on to win the 2014 World Series in seven games over the American League Champion Kansas City Royals.

==== 2015 ====
After recovering from elbow surgery, Cain gained more range of motion in his pitching arm, saying, "I feel like I'm 18 again." Before he could make his first regular-season start, Cain was placed on the disabled list with a flexor tendon strain in his right forearm.

In only 13 appearances (11 starts) in 2015, Cain went 2–4 and posted a career-worst 5.79 ERA. He also posted his lowest K/9 of his career while allowing more hits than innings pitched.

==== 2016 ====
After starting the season 1–5, Cain was placed on the disabled list on May 28 with a hamstring injury. After missing almost two months due to a hamstring injury, the Giants activated Cain off the disabled list on July 20. On July 31 at AT&T Park, in a 3–1 win over the Washington Nationals, Cain won his 100th career game by tossing five no-hit innings on 93 pitches, making him the sixth pitcher in the San Francisco Era and the 23rd pitcher in Giants franchise history to win at least 100 games. Cain is the second Giant on the 2016 season to earn his 100th career victory after teammate Johnny Cueto won his on April 26.

For the second straight season, Cain's ERA hovered in the high 5 range, finishing with a 5.64 ERA while starting 17 games for the Giants. Cain was left off the Giants 2016 postseason roster.

==== 2017 ====
On May 15 at AT&T Park, in an 8–4 win over the Los Angeles Dodgers, Cain surpassed 2,000 career innings pitched. Cain became the 12th pitcher in franchise history and joins Hall of Famers Juan Marichal and Gaylord Perry as the only three pitchers in the San Francisco era to reach the milestone. Cain made several appearances in relief during the second half of the 2017 season and recorded his first major league hold in August against the Milwaukee Brewers.

Cain faced elbow and hamstring troubles in the latter years of his career. On September 27, Cain announced that he would retire at the end of the season, making him just the fourth player in the San Francisco Era to spend his entire career with the Giants (minimum of 10 seasons), joining Jim Davenport (1958–1970), Scott Garrelts (1982–1991), and Robby Thompson (1986–1996). On September 30 at AT&T Park, Cain pitched five shutout innings against the San Diego Padres in his final career start and game.

Cain finished his Giants career second all-time among Giants pitchers in the San Francisco era with 331 starts (behind Juan Marichal), third in innings pitched with 2,085 2/3 (behind Marichal and Gaylord Perry), and third in strikeouts with 1,694 (behind Marichal and Tim Lincecum).

== Career overall ==
=== Statistics and achievements ===
Category	Years	WAR	W	L	ERA	G	GS	CG	SHO	SV	IP	H	R	ER	HR	BB	IBB	SO	HBP	ERA+	FIP	WHIP	H9	SO9	Ref.
Total	13	29.2	104	118	3.68	342	331	15	6	0	2,085 2/3	1,849	910	853	211	712	42	1,694	62	108	3.92	1.228	8.0	7.3	

== Post-playing career ==
Cain's wrote an autobiographical article published on October 3, 2017, on The Players' Tribune.

On July 28, 2018, outside AT&T Park, Cain and former teammates Ryan Vogelsong and Brian Wilson were inducted onto the San Francisco Giants Wall of Fame.

== Pitching style ==
Cain featured a mix of mostly four pitches: a four-seam fastball (90–93 mph), a slider (84–87), a curveball (76–79), and a changeup (83–86). Increasingly, he also threw a two-seam fastball at 89–91 mph. Cain led with his four-seamer, throwing it over half the time in his career. His changeup was his secondary pitch to left-handed hitters, while he threw cutters as a secondary pitch to right-handed hitters. Cain threw curveballs in roughly equal proportions to righties and lefties. Early in his career, Cain was a power pitcher whose fastball ranged from 94 to 98 mph. Due to arm injuries and age he had to adapt his pitching style to be more of a control pitcher.

== Career highlights ==
=== Awards ===
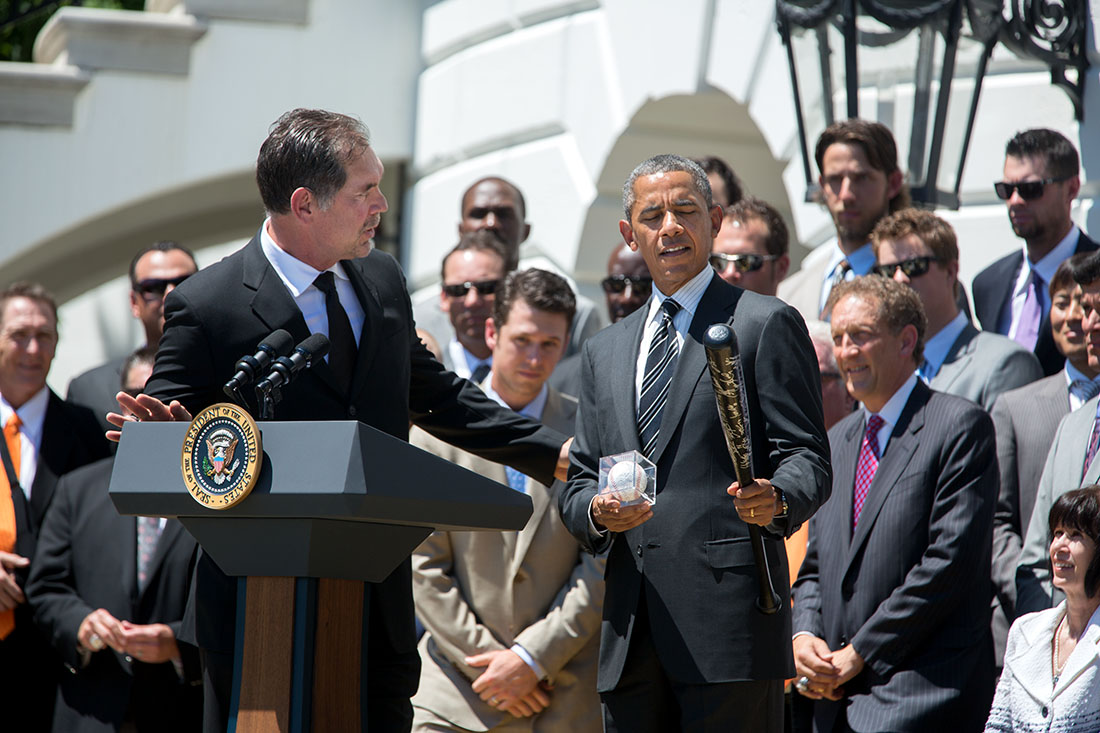
Cain with the Giants outside of the White House being honored by President Barack Obama during a ceremony honoring the team's 2012 World Series championship

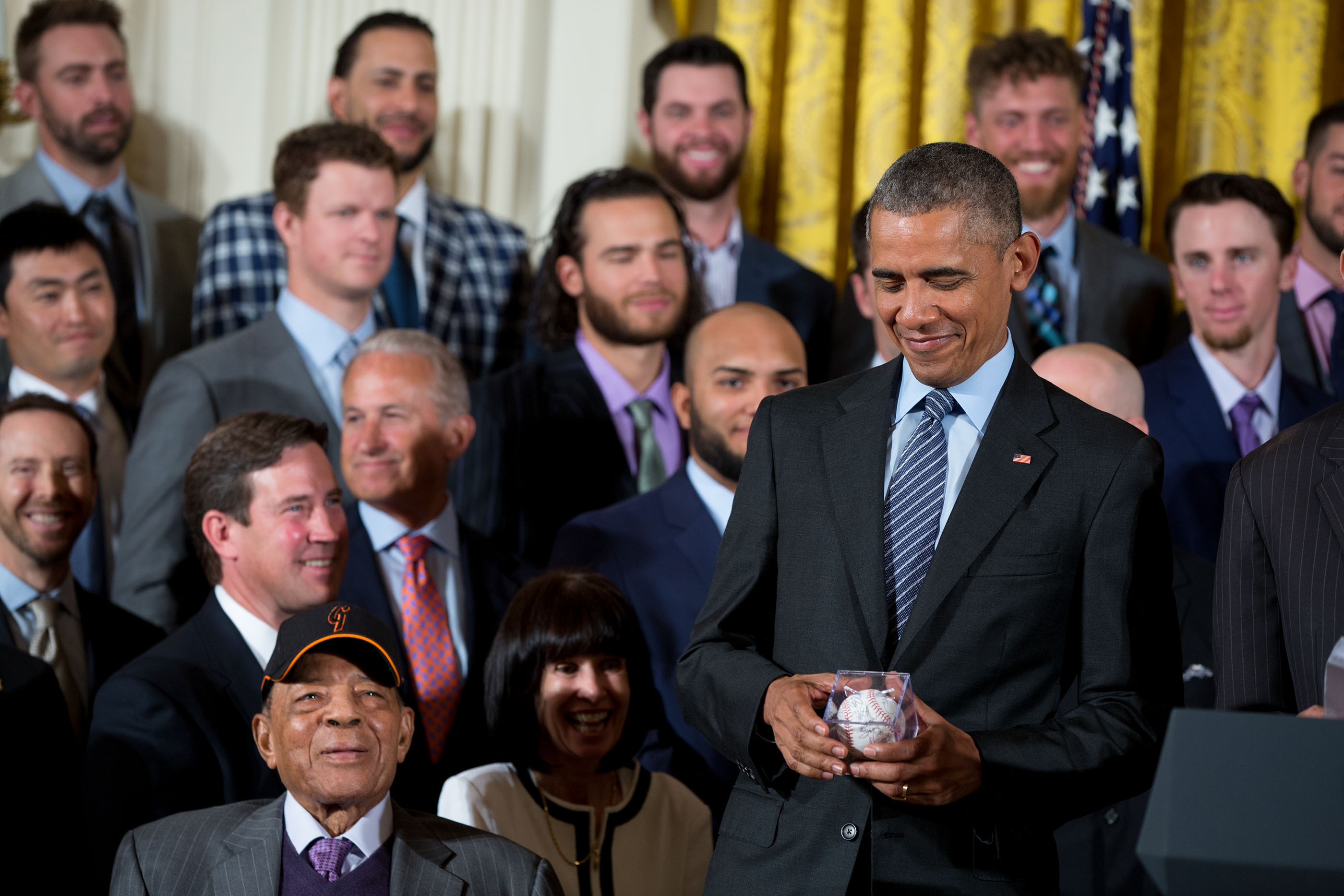
Cain with the Giants inside the White House being honored by President Barack Obama during a ceremony honoring the team's 2014 World Series championship

Award / Honor	Time(s)	Date(s)	Ref(s)
World Series champion	3	2010, 2012, 2014	
NL All-Star	3	2009, 2011, 2012	
Major League Baseball Player of the Week Award	1	June 11–17, 2012	
Willie Mac Award	1	2009	

== Personal life ==
Cain met his wife Chelsea Williams during spring training while she was a student at Arizona State University majoring in sociology. At the time, Chelsea was waitressing at a local steakhouse. The two married in fall 2009 and have two daughters. They have homes in Arizona, Tennessee, and Orinda, California. As a hobby, Cain enjoys hunting. In addition, he supports Project Open Hand, and has expressed his support for same-sex marriage by appearing in the "No H8" photo campaign opposing California's Proposition 8.

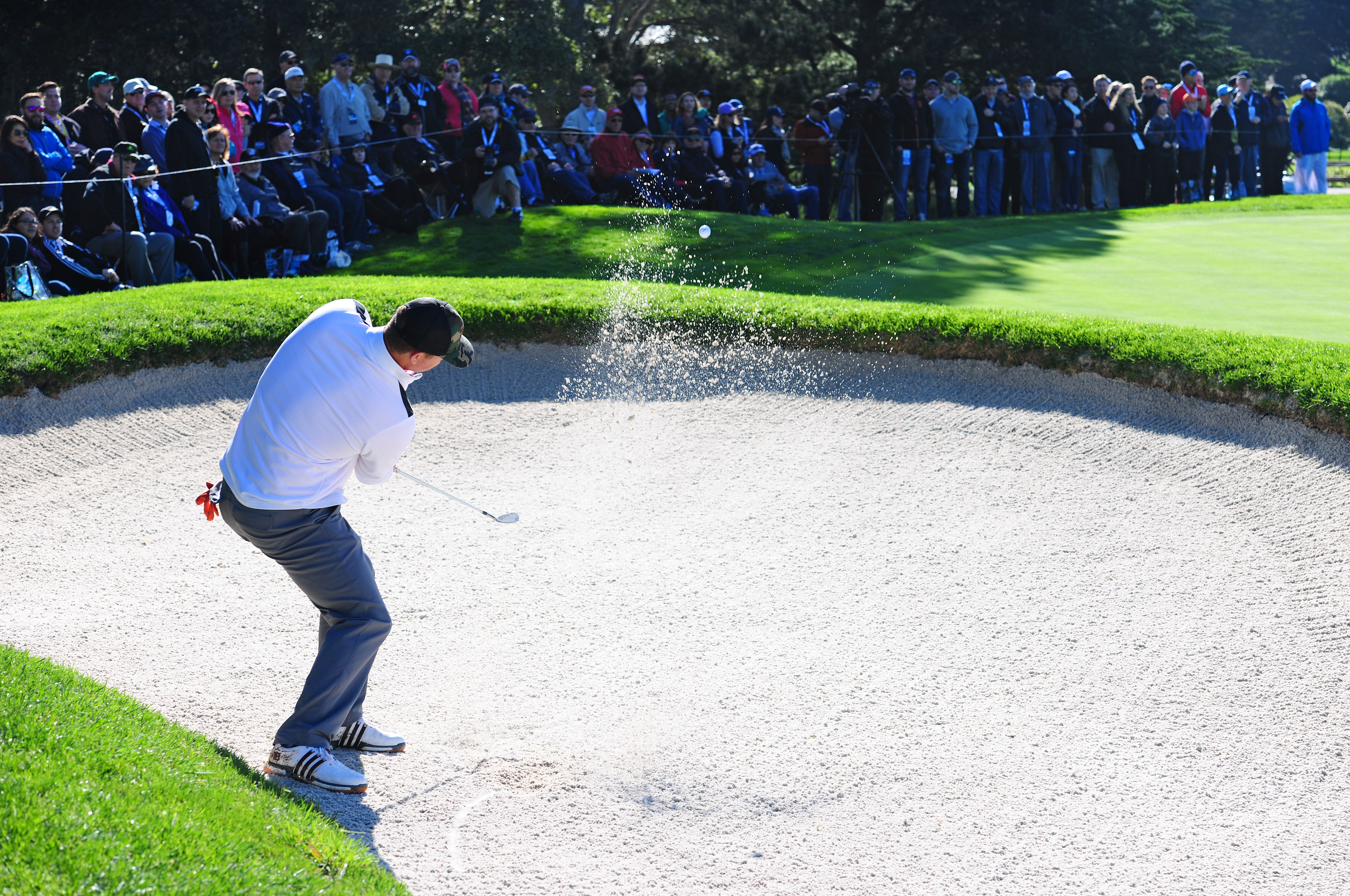
Cain playing golf in the 2017 AT&T Pebble Beach Pro-Am

Cain is an avid golfer. Prior to his perfect game, Cain and professional golfer Dustin Johnson hit golf balls from home plate into McCovey Cove.

== Activism ==
=== Philanthropy ===
On December 10, 2013, Cain and his wife Chelsea pledged to donate $50,000 to the Make-A-Wish Foundation. He was inspired by the success of the organization's Greater Bay Area work with five-year-old Miles Scott dressing up as Batman and becoming "Batkid" for the day and saving San Francisco. Scott made his rescue through AT&T Park. On April 8, 2014, at AT&T Park, in the Giants home opener, Batkid rode in from left field in his Batmobile and threw the ceremonial first pitch to Cain.

== See also ==
- List of Major League Baseball no-hitters
- List of Major League Baseball perfect games
- List of Major League Baseball players who spent their entire career with one franchise
- List of San Francisco Giants no-hitters
- List of San Francisco Giants team records
- List of World Series starting pitchers

Sporting positions
Preceded by Philip Humber	Perfect game pitcher June 13, 2012	Succeeded by Félix Hernández
Preceded by Kevin Millwood, Charlie Furbush, Stephen Pryor, Lucas Luetge, Brandon League & Tom Wilhelmsen	No-hitter pitcher June 13, 2012	Succeeded by Félix Hernández
Preceded by Roy Halladay	National League All-Star Game Starting Pitcher; 2012	Succeeded by Matt Harvey
