= Batkid =

American child and cancer survivor

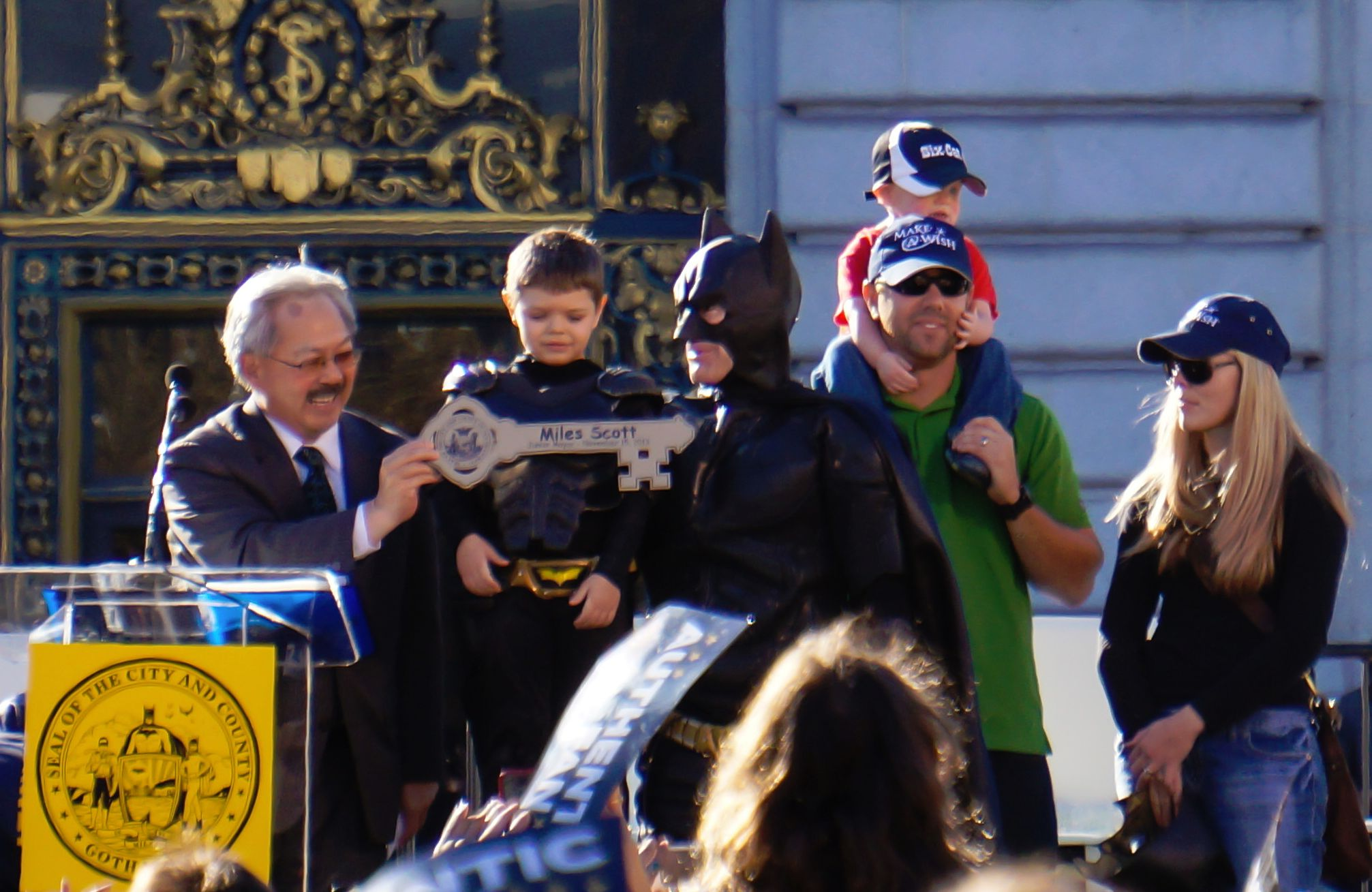
"Batkid" (Miles Scott) receiving the Key to the City of "Gotham" (San Francisco) from Mayor Ed Lee, while "Batman" (Eric Johnston) and Miles' parents and younger brother look on

Batkid is the superhero name of Miles Scott, an American child and cancer survivor. His wish was to be "Batkid", a sidekick of the comic book superhero Batman, the subject of books, radio, television, and films. Once the request went out, thousands of volunteers, city officials, businesses and supporters rallied to turn San Francisco, California into "Gotham City" – the fictional home city of Batman – on November 15, 2013, for one of the largest and most elaborate Make-A-Wish projects ever staged.

Batkid took part in staged events including several crime scenarios, and received the key to the city from San Francisco mayor Ed Lee. Elected officials, and representatives from law enforcement also took part, and the San Francisco Chronicle, the city's main newspaper, produced a "Gotham City Chronicle" in honor of the efforts with the headline "Batkid Saves City: Hooded hero nabs Riddler, rescues damsel in distress."

== Background ==
Miles Scott is a cancer survivor from Tulelake, in northern California near the border of Oregon. He was diagnosed with lymphoblastic leukemia – a form of leukemia, or cancer of the white blood cells characterized by excess lymphoblasts – at 18 months old. In chemotherapy treatment for several years he is now in remission, and the celebration is in honor of his completing treatments, the last one in June 2013. His mother shared that the decision was made to wait until the treatments were complete so that Miles would be strong enough for the day, and also it gave him something to look forward to while undergoing treatments. "This wish has meant closure for our family and an end to over three years of putting toxic drugs in our son's body," she said on the Make-A-Wish site. During his treatments Miles was "fascinated with superheroes." They were crimefighters and saviors. And they always won in the end." When the San Francisco Make-A-Wish asked Miles what he wanted more than anything else, he replied, "I wish to be Batman."

== Batkid Day ==
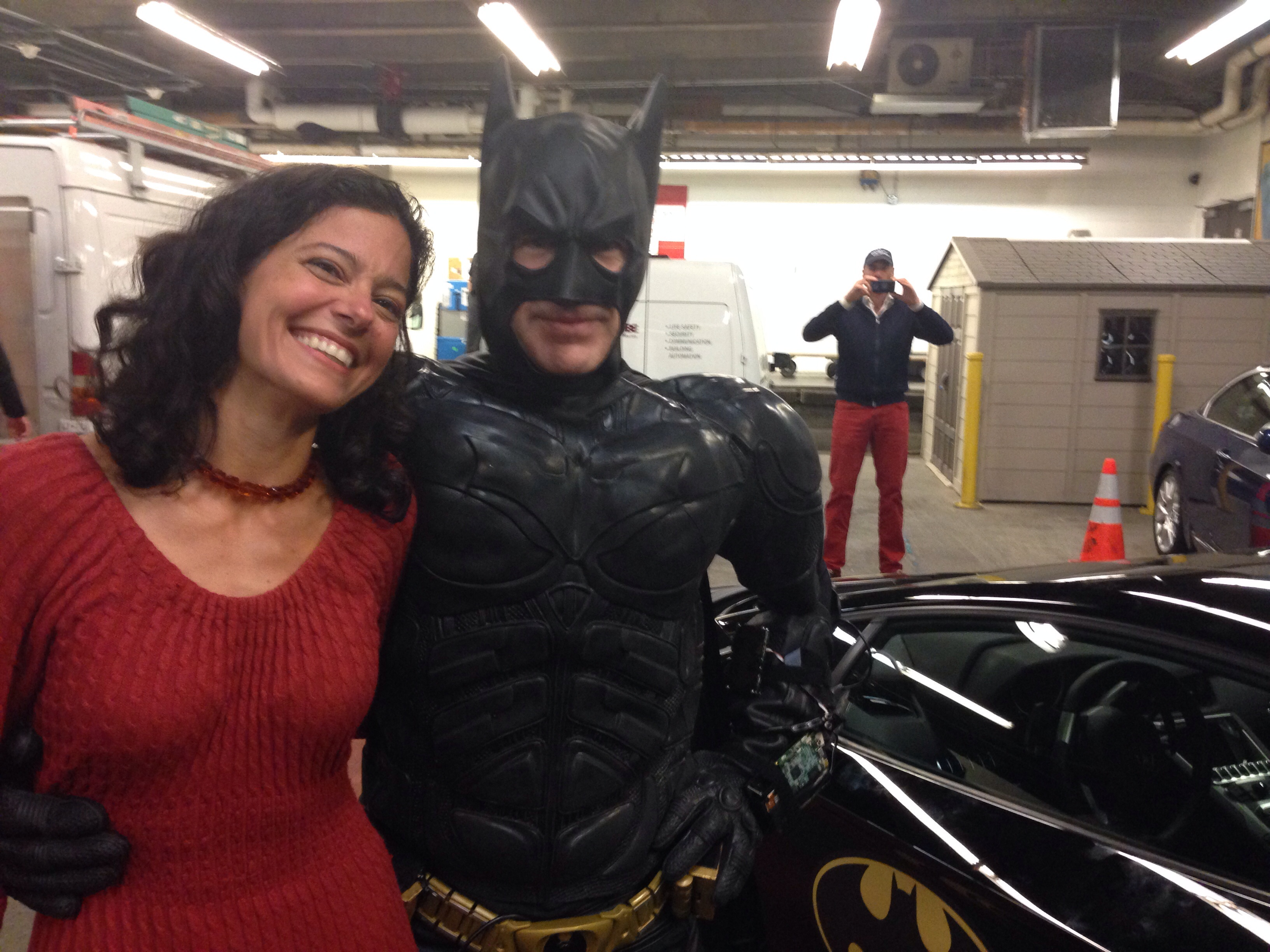
The Damsel in distress and Batman actors next to one of two black Lamborghinis which served as the Batmobile

Organized by the Make-A-Wish Foundation, the San Francisco Greater Bay Area chapter, the event was aided throughout by a social media plan created by a marketing agency. The chapter sent out an email a month prior to the event asking for supporters, initially hoping for just several hundred people to be a part of the closing ceremony. The request soon spread; by the night before the event over 12,000 volunteers pledged to be a part of making Batkid day happen. Estimates are 10,000–12,000 people took part at various venues to cheer on Batkid. Many dressed as superheroes in support.

Miles was told he was just going to visit San Francisco to pick up a costume so he could dress like Batman; instead, he found himself to be the sidekick helper to an actor dressed as the superhero. His younger brother was dressed as Batman's sidekick Robin. He was watching a local TV news broadcast in the family's hotel room, when the broadcast was interrupted by a flash announcement from San Francisco police chief Greg Suhr appealing for help from Batkid.

He left Union Square in a 'Batmobile' with police escort, and soon was on the scene of a damsel in distress, who was tied up on the train tracks of the San Francisco historic cable cars in the Russian Hill neighborhood. They also disabled a plastic replica of a bomb. Crowds roared every step of the adventure with many of the onlookers holding signs supporting the mini-superhero, and chanting "Batkid, Batkid!" Police Chief Suhr pre-recorded a number of messages to Batkid, serving as the emcee for the events. Batman had a special video watch which would play each message from the police chief as needed. Batman and Batkid were transported, along with Miles' family, in two black Lamborghinis adorned with Batman logos, and escorted by police.

His next exploit was to aid in stopping The Riddler from robbing a bank vault in the financial district. Following the capture of The Riddler, the crime-fighting duo refueled for lunch at Burger Bar in San Francisco's Union Square, as thousands filled the area to show support.

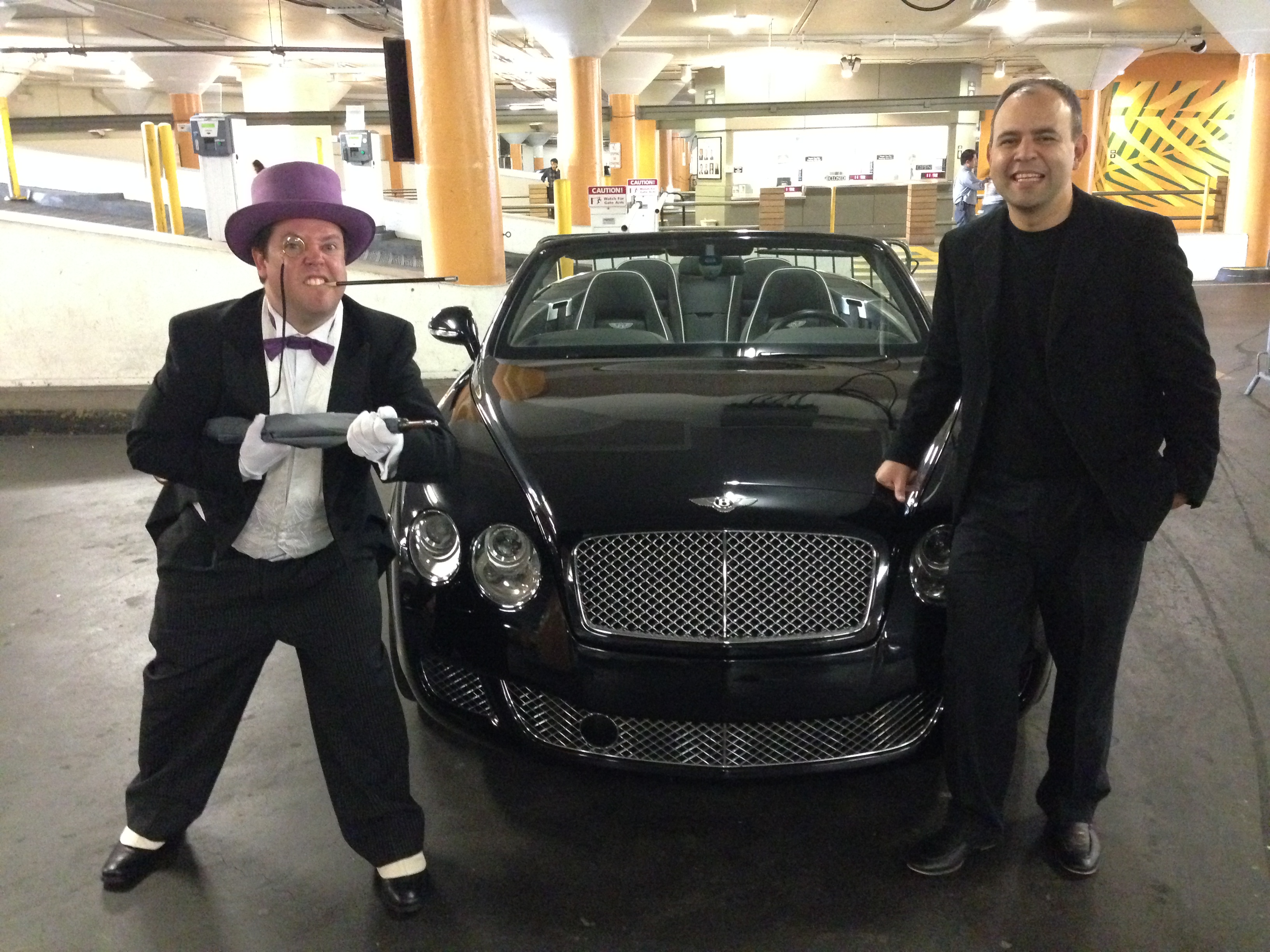
The Penguin and a henchman actors from SF Batkid Wish

His final adventure was presented to him by a flash mob dance performance of Journey's "Don't Stop Believin'," which directed him to chase after another villain, The Penguin, who drove out of the Union Square car garage with the San Francisco Giants' mascot Lou Seal tied up in a convertible Bentley.

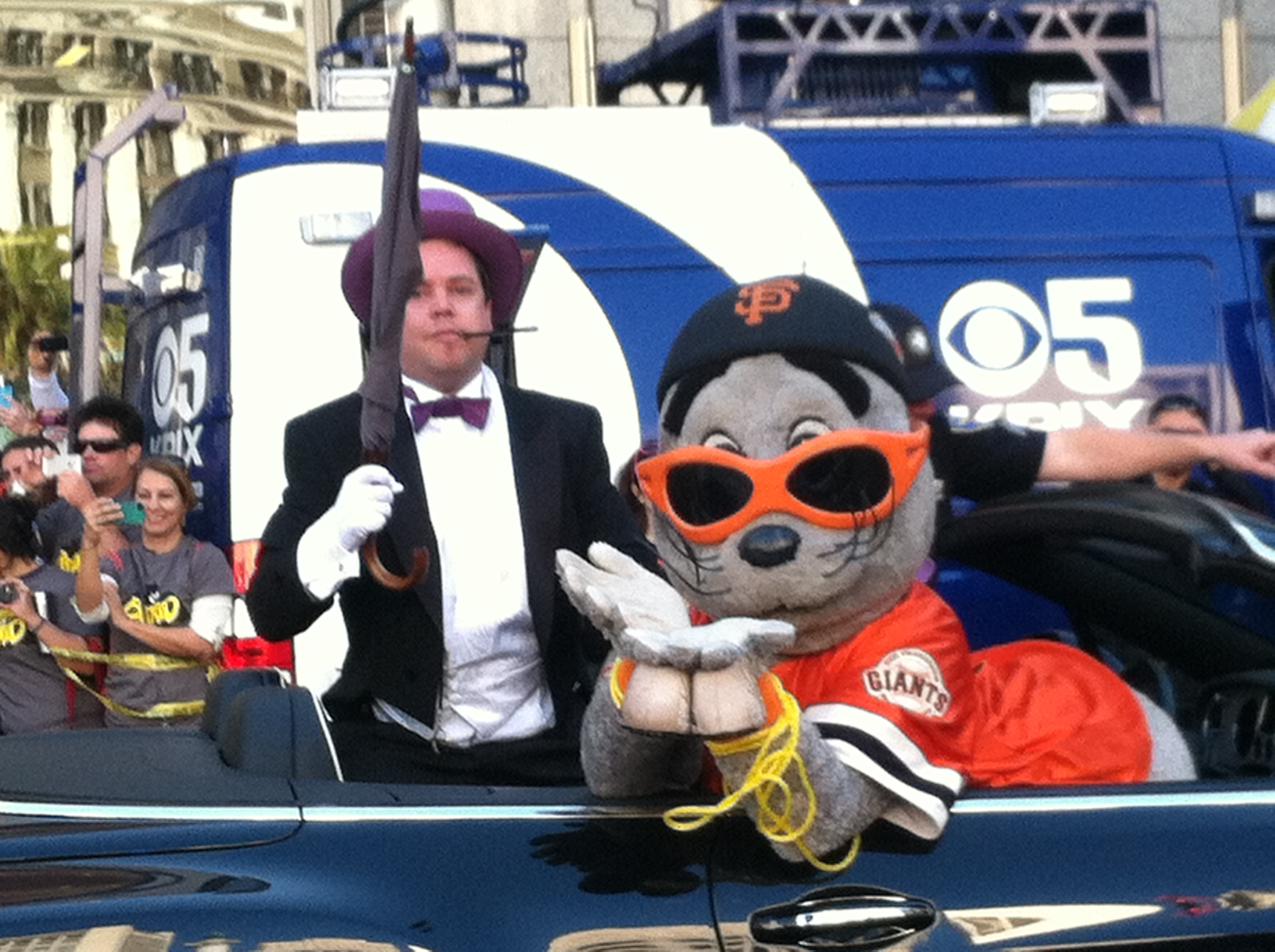
The Penguin (Mike Jutan) "kidnapping" Lou Seal for S.F.'s Batkid Wish experience

The Penguin's car took off along the streets of San Francisco, followed in pursuit by Batman and Batkid in their Bat-Lamborghinis, en route to AT&T Park. In AT&T Park, The Penguin taunted visitors, attempting to get them to chant "Penguin! Penguin! Penguin!" in support of him, rather than the chant the crowd preferred, "Batkid! Batkid! Batkid!" Batkid and Batman arrived, climbing stairs at AT&T Park, and ultimately chasing The Penguin through the park. After a chase through the cable car, The Penguin exploded a flash pot after saying, "I hope you like traps!" Batman and Batkid then climbed through a series of obstacle courses, in hot pursuit of The Penguin. They slid down the park slides, finding The Penguin's "lair", and then chasing him down to the mini-baseball diamond in the stands. Batkid freed Lou Seal and Batman chased The Penguin, ultimately capturing him and handing him over to officers from the San Francisco Police Department.

At the end of the day Batkid was taken to San Francisco City Hall where the largest of the crowds gathered in the thousands for a rally. He was given the key to the city by San Francisco mayor Ed Lee. He also received a video tweet from President Barack Obama at the White House as part of the effort. The U.S. Justice department's U.S. Attorney Melinda Haag "unveiled" indictments for both the Riddler and the Penguin with conspiracy charges. He was also presented with a Federal Bureau of Investigation "raid jacket", and a S.F. Police Department cap.

Batkid: The Official Make-A-Wish Story is a ten-minute video written, produced and directed by John Crane Films located in the San Francisco Bay Area. Director John Crane and crew of 12 staged and captured all of the action using three primary cameras, Go Pros, and roving cameras. John Crane also served as Executive Producer for Batkid Begins which used his written segments and footage extensively and was purchased by Warner Brothers.

=== Cast ===
- Batman – Eric Johnston (inventor/software engineer)
- The Penguin – Mike Jutan (software engineer)
- Damsel in Distress – Sue Graham Johnston
- The Riddler – Philip Watt (local actor)
- Lou Seal – mascot of the San Francisco Giants

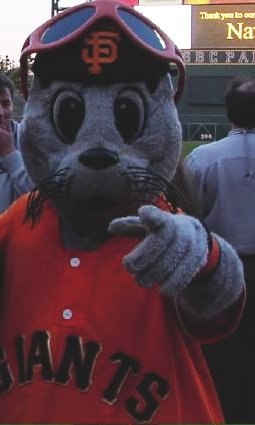
Lou Seal has served as mascot of the San Francisco Giants since 1996. He was at the third crime scene visited by Batkid, who saved him from The Penguin.

=== Coverage ===
The events were live video blogged by the San Francisco Chronicle, the largest newspaper of the city. Television crews followed the events, including CNN. Articles/photos/videos were posted on sites including Fox News, The Guardian, Washington Post, San Francisco Chronicle, Los Angeles Times, IGN, Yahoo! News, CBS News, Mashable, Wired, Hollywood Reporter, NPR, Huffington Post, The Telegraph, Gawker, USA Today, New York Times, Jezebel, Business Insider, ABC News, World News with Diane Sawyer, CityNews (Toronto, Canada), BBC, The Times of India, Time, CNET, TMZ, Good Morning America, and more. Local ABC News had an embedded digital reporter and aided in the initial newsbreak of the day. People around the world followed events on Twitter feeds as well as live video feeds, and social media.

There were 406,960 tweets on the day of the event, using either the #batkid or #SFBatkid hashtag on Twitter. Mashable also announced that Batkid was discussed in a total of 117 countries, and the news reached somewhere between 750 million-1.7 billion people worldwide, according to social-media agency Clever Girls. More than 21,683 Instagram and Twitter photos were posted by Friday afternoon. This single Buzzfeed article garnered over 2.5 million hits within 3 days of the event. Public interest brought so much traffic to the Make-A-Wish Foundation's website that it crashed.

The San Francisco Chronicle as the Gotham City Chronicle released a special edition paper in honor of the events with the headline "Batkid Saves City," and articles written by fictional Batman-related journalists Clark Kent (Superman's alter ego) and Lois Lane (his journalism partner and sometimes love interest).

=== Aftermath ===
Some services were donated; the remaining $105,000 in costs to the City of San Francisco, which the Make-A-Wish Foundation had intended to raise the money to repay, was covered by a donation from philanthropists John and Marcia Goldman. Donations to Make-A-Wish greatly increased in the weeks after national coverage of Batkid.

On April 8, 2014, Miles Scott, dressed as Batkid, threw the ceremonial first pitch to Matt Cain at the Giants' 2014 home opener.

The documentary film, Batkid Begins, chronicles the events of the day, and Miles Scott's life since that day occurred. Dana Nachman and Liza Meak produced the film, which premiered at the Slamdance Film Festival, and was released theatrically on June 26, 2015.

In January 2015, it was announced that Julia Roberts will produce and star in a feature adaptation of the documentary Batkid Begins titled, Batkid Begins: The Wish Heard Around the World.

Four years after the events, in 2017, Scott was still in remission and healthy. In November 2018, after turning 10 years old, he marked 5 years in remission, and was considered cancer-free. Scott turned 15 in August 2023 and marked the 10-year anniversary of the event on November 15, 2023.

== See also ==
- Participatory culture
- Street theater
