= Pick of the Litter (film) =

- Directed by: Dana Nachman; Don Hardy
- Written by: Dana Nachman
- Produced by: Dana Nachman; Don Hardy
- Release dates: January 2018 (Slamdance Film Festival); August 31, 2018
- Running time: 81 minutes
- Country: United States
- Language: English

Pick of the Litter is a 2018 American documentary film by Dana Nachman and Don Hardy about a two-year odyssey following puppies training to be guide dogs for the blind. It had its world premiere at the Slamdance Film Festival in January. A web television series of the same name inspired by the film and following a new group of dogs was released on Disney+ on December 20, 2019.

== Plot ==
The film follows a litter of 5 puppies at Guide Dogs for the Blind on the quest to become guide dogs. The dogs are born on GDB's campus to one of their breeder dogs and at two months old they are placed with volunteer puppy raisers to continue basic training. The puppy raisers have the dogs between 14 and 16 months, although puppies can be "career changed" at any point. Throughout this period of time, GDB's community representatives conduct frequent visits to check in on the puppies' progress.

Patriot: Placed with puppy raiser Nick (his 1st GDB dog). Patriot was not behaving well accompanying Nick to high school, so GDB transferred Patriot to puppy raiser Adam (an Iraq veteran). Adam and Patriot form a special bond, as Patriot helps Adam with his PTSD. Patriot is transferred to more experienced puppy raiser Maureen to help him make progress faster. Upon returning to GDB's campus, Patriot trains with Melanie and passes his preliminary guide work test 1. During the next phase of training Patriot struggles a lot, especially controlling how he responds to other dogs, so he is career changed. GDB contacts Adam again to gift him Patriot, for him to serve as his unofficial PTSD dog.

Phil: Placed with puppy raiser Patti (her 1st GDB dog). Phil is transferred to more experienced puppy raiser Kristin (her 10th GDB dog) to help him make progress faster. Upon returning to GDB's campus, Phil trains with Adam (no relation to Adam the puppy raiser) but doesn't pass his preliminary guide work test 1. Some weeks later, Phil is retested and passes. Weeks later, Phil takes his final 5 tests, passing all of them. Phil graduates the program and he is matched with Ronald who was waiting for his 1st guide dog. Phil and Ronald bonded well, they go to school together every day and enjoy going on hikes.

Poppet: Placed with puppy raiser Cathy (her 8th GDB dog). Upon returning to GDB's campus, Poppet trains with Adam (no relation to Adam the puppy raiser) and passes her preliminary guide work test 1. Weeks later, Poppet takes her final 5 tests, but fails two of them. When retested, Poppet passes all final tests. Poppet graduates the program and she is matched with Janet who was waiting for her 4th guide dog. Poppet and Janet love each other, they go to work every day and Janet says Poppet is the best guide dog she has ever had.

Potomac: Placed with puppy raiser Linda (her 2nd GDB dog). At 12 months old Potomac is career changed, as he was struggling with basic training skills, such as ignoring distractions on the floor as he walks guiding a person. Potomac went on to become a pet dog with a family in Oregon.

Primrose: Placed with puppy raiser Rebecca (her 7th GDB dog). Having done excellent in the training program, GDB decides to make Primrose a breeder. The film ends with Primrose giving birth to a litter of 5 puppies, who will now all begin training on the quest to become guide dogs.

== Reception ==
The movie had a positive reception from critics, scoring 97% on Rotten Tomatoes, based on 67 reviews, with an average score of 7.3/10. The Critics Consensus reads, "Pick of the Litter has all the fluffy adorableness audiences expect from a puppy documentary, along with a story that's as edifying as it is heartwarming."

== TV Series ==
The writer-director duo of the film developed a series based on the film with the same name for Disney+ which started streaming from December 20, 2019.

== See also ==
- Too Cute-TV series similar in content
- 2018 in film
