= Hunt of a Lifetime =

American nonprofit organization

Hunt of a Lifetime Foundation Inc.
- Formation: 1999; 27 years ago
- Founder: Tina Pattison
- Founded at: Harborcreek, Pennsylvania
- Headquarters: 2227 Eastern Ave; Erie, PA 16510
- President: Tina Pattison
- Website: huntofalifetime.org
- Making Dreams Come True... Moved From Harborcreek, Pennsylvania

Hunt of a Lifetime Foundation inc. is a nonprofit 501(c)(3) organization dedicated to fulfilling hunting and fishing related wishes of children 21 and under with life-threatening illnesses.

== History ==
In 1998, Hunt of a Lifetime Foundation Inc. Founder Tina Pattison decided to grant the wish of her stepson, Matt, diagnosed with lymphoma, and began to raise money for a moose-hunting trip. Matt was 19 and too old to qualify for help from the Make-A-Wish Foundation. However, Pattison sent him on the trip after raising funds from hunters and hunting-supply companies in the US and Canada.

In 1999, Matt died of lymphoma. In that same year, the Make-A-Wish Foundation, responding to criticisms from animal rights groups and concerns over child safety, ceased granting hunting-related wishes. Cash donations collected at Matt's funeral were used to start the foundation.
