= Dana Nachman =

American documentary filmmaker

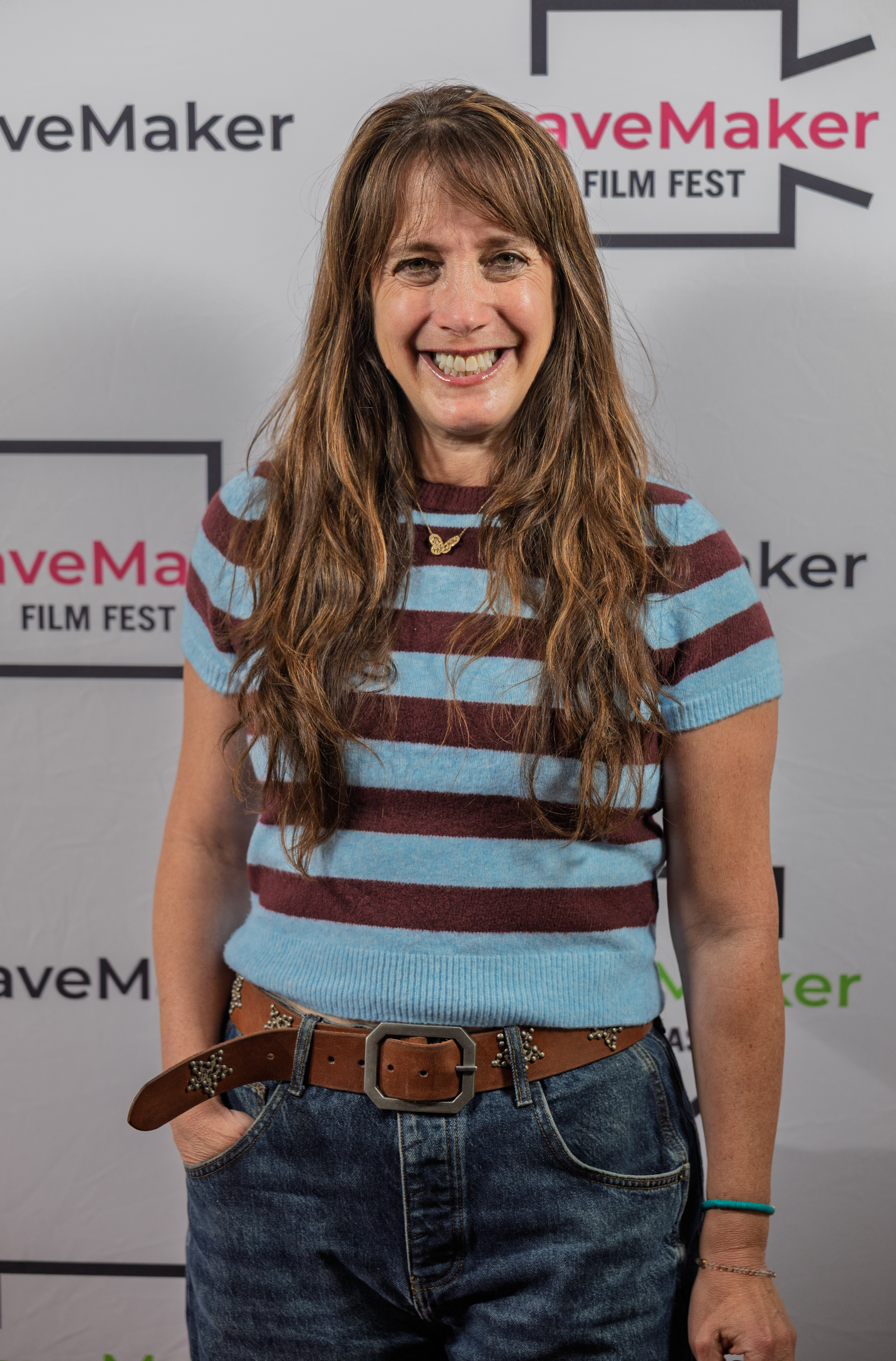
- Nachman at the BraveMaker Film Festival in 2026

Dana Nachman is an independent documentary filmmaker based in Northern California. She has written, directed, and produced six feature documentaries including the 2020 film Dear Santa and the 2018 Pick of the Litter and Witch Hunt, The Human Experiment, Love Hate Love, Batkid Begins and Pick of The Litter.

Nachman was one of the showrunners for the limited original series Pick of the Litter based on her feature of the same name.

Nachman is a former journalist and worked on NBC Bay Area television documentaries. She produced the 2002 documentary Close to Home, which detailed the lives of Bay Area families impacted by the September 11 attacks. The documentary won an Edward R. Murrow Award and an Emmy Award. Her next film, Pot & Politics, focused on medical cannabis and earned an Associated Press Award for Best Documentary. Her 2007 film Dreams to Dust explored the internment of Japanese Americans and was nominated for an Emmy. Nachman is the co-owner of KTF Films, along with Don Hardy. They produced The Human Experiment, which documented dangerous chemicals found in household products. Nachman and Hardy's Witch Hunt premiered at the 2008 Toronto International Film Festival.

As part of KTF Films, Nachman directed the 2015 film Batkid Begins, a documentary about Batkid. The film premiered at the Slamdance Film Festival on January 24, 2015 and was bought by Warner Brothers and New Line Cinemas. Nachman will serve as the executive producer in New Line Cinema's narrative remake of the movie involving Julia Roberts.

Collectively, her films have won dozens of awards at many film festivals, including the 2011 Artivist Film Festival, 2009 DC Independent Film Festival, Dallas International Film Festival, and Heartland Film Festival. Her films have also won two awards at the Cinequest Film Festival, Rincon International Film Festival, Ashland Film Festival, and Sonoma International Film Festival. Nachman herself has won three Emmy Awards, the Edward R. Murrow Award and has received grants for her work from the Tribeca Institute, Fledgling Fund, and the Pacific Pioneer Fund. Nachman's 2026 Documentary Short, The Second Life of Freddie Nole premiered at Tribeca Festival, won Audience Choice Awards at San Francisco Documentary Film Festival, Indy Shorts Festival and Royale Film Festival. It also earned the Richard D. Propes Social Impact Award at the Indy Shorts Festival, and the Award of Excellence at the Impact Docs Awards.

Nachman won the best female filmmaker awards at the 2018 Cleveland International Film Festival as well as the Seattle International FIlm Festival.

Nachman is a member of the Directors Guild of America and the DGA's Women's Steering Committee.

Nachman was born and raised in the New York suburbs and moved to Northern California to pursue her career in documentary filmmaking.
