= Make-A-Wish Foundation =

Non-profit organization founded in the United States

Make-A-Wish
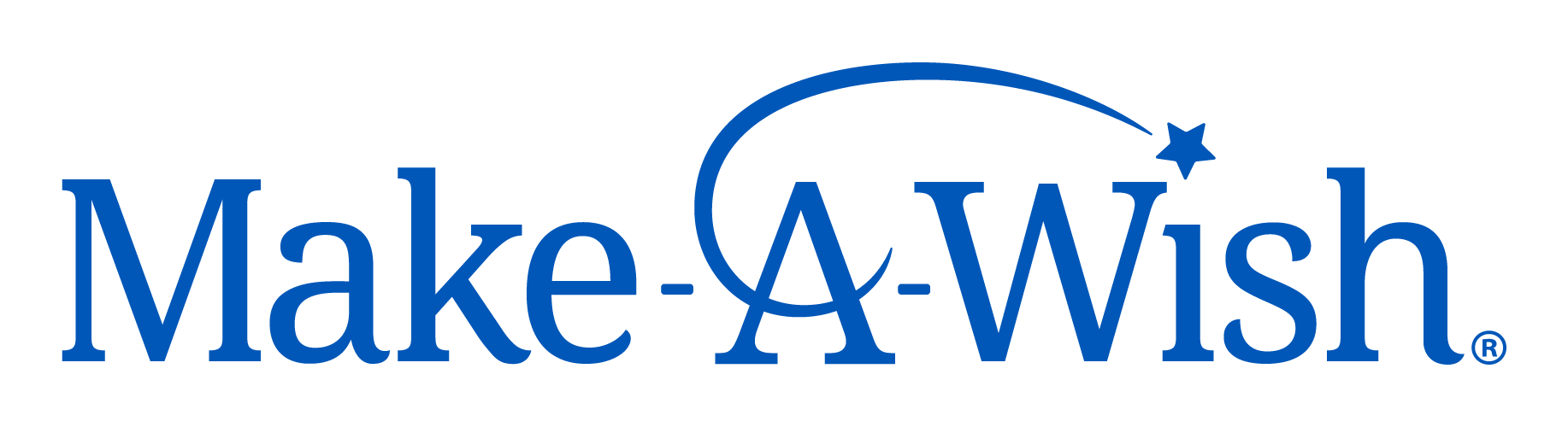
- Formation: April 29, 1980; 46 years ago
- Type: 501(c)(3) non-profit organization
- Purpose: Fulfilling the wishes of children with critical illnesses
- Headquarters: Phoenix, Arizona, U.S.
- Region served: International
- Services: Children 2.5-18 years old with serious illnesses
- President & CEO: Leslie Motter
- Website: wish.org

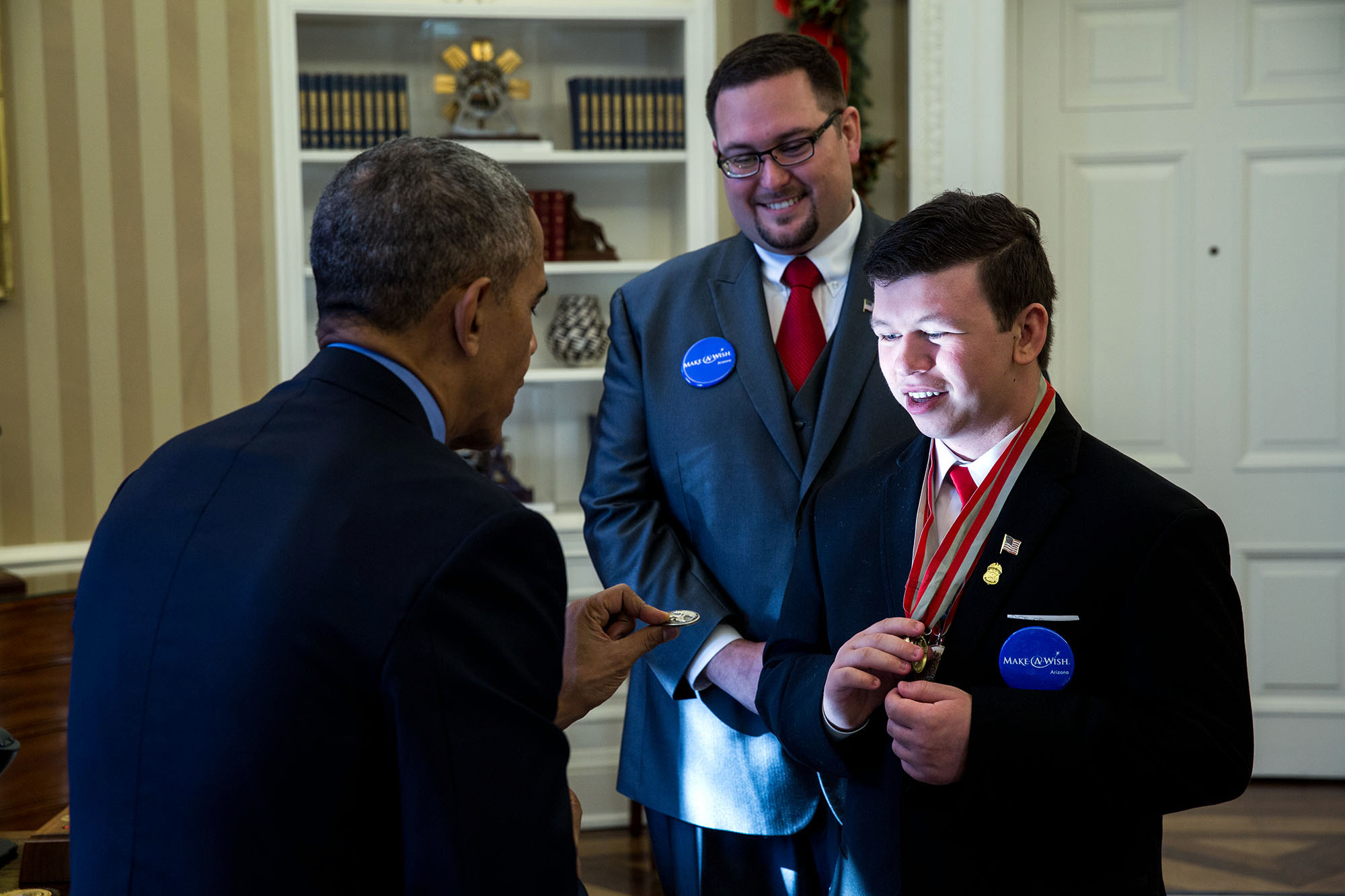
President Barack Obama with Make-A-Wish recipient Nick Wetzel and his older brother Stephan on December 9, 2016

The Make-A-Wish Foundation is a 501(c)(3) nonprofit organization founded in the United States that helps fulfill the wishes of seriously ill children. The organization is headquartered in Phoenix and operates through its 58 chapters located throughout the United States. Make-A-Wish also operates in about 50 other countries through 40 international affiliates. Professional wrestler John Cena holds the title for the most wishes granted by a single individual, at over 650 wishes.

The organization grants wishes to children between 2.5 and 18 years old with a condition that is progressive, degenerative, or malignant and who have not been granted a wish by another, similar, organization.

Make-A-Wish is one of the largest U.S. charities, and as of 2017, the charity granted wishes to 285,000 American children in total, with 15,300 wishes granted in 2016. As of 2026, Make-A-Wish has about $572 million in total assets.

== History ==
The inspiration behind the founding of Make-A-Wish Foundation was the story of a 7-year old boy named Christopher James Grecius. Chris suffered from leukemia and had a lifelong dream to be a police officer. In autumn 1980, a customs officer named Tommy Austin made friends with Chris and his family. Knowing the worsening condition of Chris, Austin contacted Ron Cox, an officer from Arizona Department of Public Safety, to help him realize Chris' dream.

On April 29, 1980, a few police officers gathered to give Chris his wish. He was flown in a police helicopter, given police uniforms specially made for him, and inaugurated as the first honorary patrol officer in the department's history. Chris died a few days after, but his experience left a deep impression for everyone involved.

=== Founding and development ===
Inspired by positive impacts from Chris' experience, a small group who realized his desire, including Chris' mother, Linda Bergendahl-Pauling, Frank Shankwitz, and Scott Stahl, decided to form an organization that can do similar things for other children. The organization was formally founded as the Make-A-Wish Foundation in 1980.

The first wish that was granted by the charity was for a boy named Frank "Bopsy" Salazar who also suffered from leukemia. He wanted to be a firefighter and to visit Disneyland. In 1981, the charity got national attention after an article in Reader's Digest narrated the story of Chris Greicius. This caused a wave of support and the formation of new branches all across the United States. In 1983, Make-A-Wish Foundation of America was founded to standardize processes and manage the organization's growth. In 1993, they expanded overseas with the foundation of Make-A-Wish Foundation International.

=== Admission criteria change ===
In March 2023, the organization removed cystic fibrosis from its list of qualifying condition because of "life-changing advances" to disease outcomes, with life expectancy increasing from 38 years for cystic fibross patients born between 2007 and 2011 to 53 years a decade later, and a "breakthrough" therapy approved in 2019 by the FDA.

== Canada ==
The Make-A-Wish Foundation of Canada is a registered national Canadian charitable organization whose mission is to fulfil the wishes of children diagnosed with life-threatening illnesses. It has chapters in every province and territory of Canada. The most popular wishes include travel and the opportunity to meet celebrities. Its mascot is named "Roary".

=== Children's Wish Foundation of Canada ===
The Children's Wish Foundation of Canada was founded in 1984 by Laura Cole. Originally granting fewer than 20 wishes a year, the foundation has established the capacity to fulfill upwards of 1,000 wishes annually. They helped children all across Canada; as of 2017 they had granted over 25,000 wishes.. In October 2019, Children's Wish Foundation of Canada merged with Make-A-Wish Canada to form Make-A-Wish Foundation of Canada.

== Wish grantees ==
The list of notable individuals who granted wishes or donated to the charity are shown below:

- John Cena: 650 wishes
- Justin Bieber: 250 wishes
- Michael Jordan: $10 million donation on his 60th birthday
- Hugh Jackman
- Miley Cyrus
- Kelsea Ballerini
- Chris Pratt
- Dwayne Johnson
- Selena Gomez

== Impact ==
A number of studies and reports show that the experience of a wish has a significant positive impact on children's mental and emotional health. A study that was published in the journal Pediatric Research in 2022 found that children who had their wishes granted showed an increase in quality of life and a decrease in anxiety level. Doctors also reported that these experiences can give additional motivation for children to obey difficult treatment schedules.

A Nationwide Children's Hospital study by Anup Patel, a member of the charity's Medical Advisory Council, and others shows that granted wishes reduced unplanned hospital visits by over half and unplanned emergency visits by almost half for patients, controlling for gender, age, and disease category and complexity variations.

One of the most known wishes that got global media attention was "Batkid" in 2013: Make-A-Wish's San Francisco branch turned the city into Gotham City for one day for Miles Scott, a 5-year old children who is in remission from leukemia. This event involved thousands of volunteers.

== Hunting and fishing ==
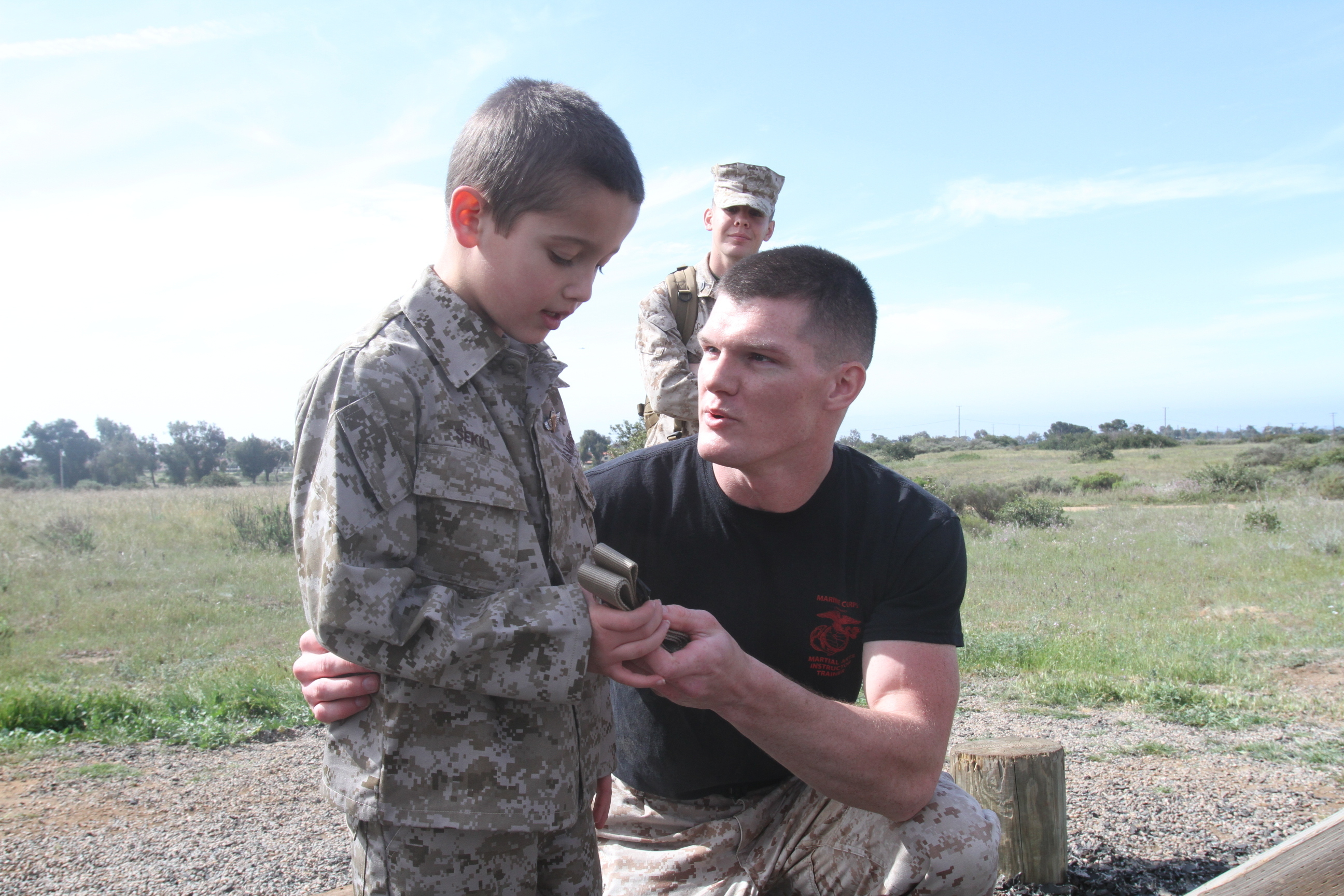
U.S. Marines involved in the Make-A-Wish activities for children

In 1996, the organization granted a teenager from Alaska's wish to hunt Kodiak bears. It caused intense criticism from animal rights groups and a few donors. Afterwards, Make-A-Wish of America's board of directors gathered to vote and decided to stop granting wishes involving hunting-related activities or weapons. In response, three organizations to arrange hunting trips for terminally ill children were formed: Hunt of a Lifetime, Catch-a-Dream, and Life Hunts.
