= McCovey Cove =

Body of water in San Francisco Bay

Coordinates: 37°46′38″N 122°23′17″W

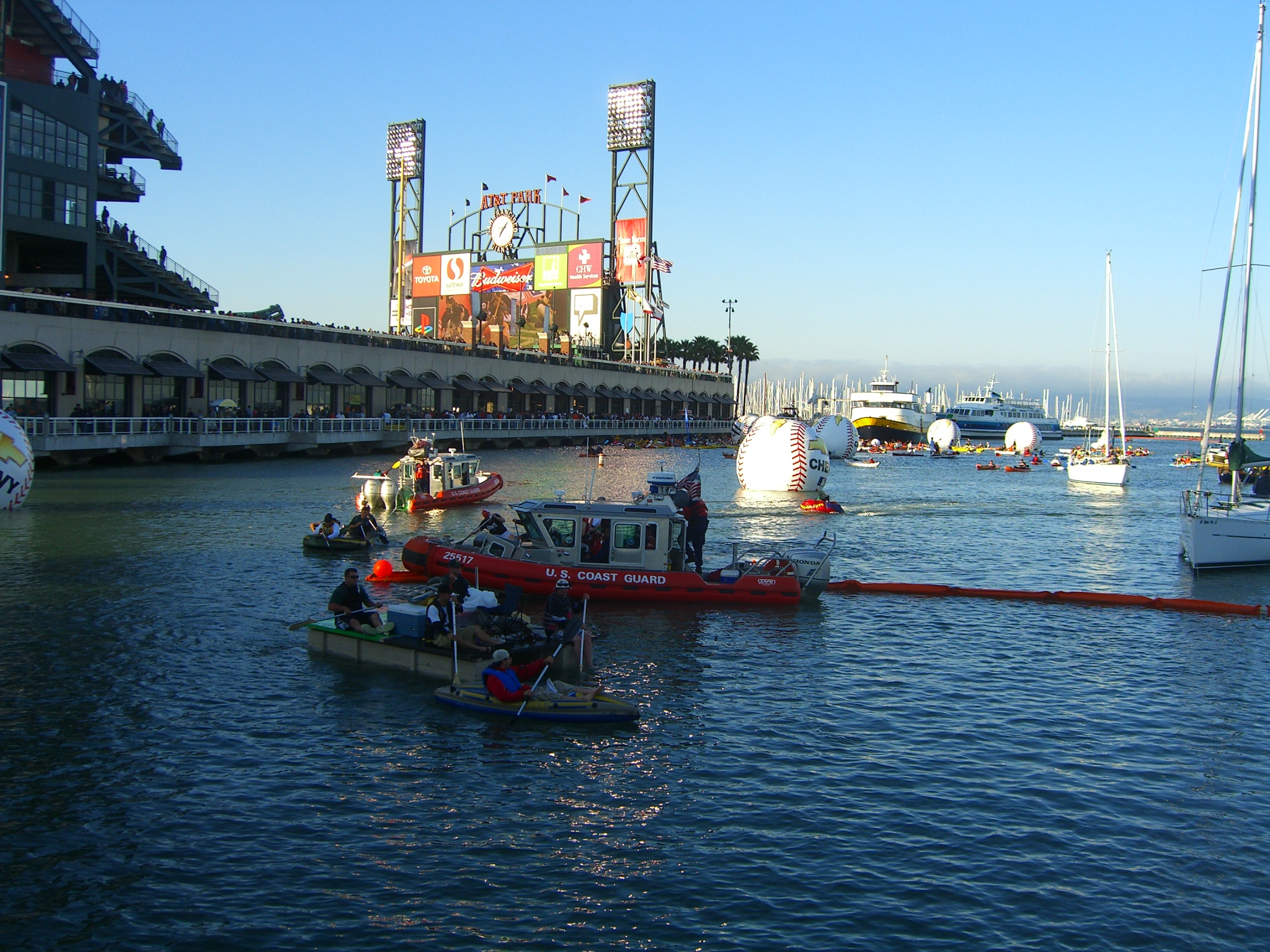
McCovey Cove

McCovey Cove is the unofficial name of a section of San Francisco Bay beyond the right field wall of Oracle Park, home of the San Francisco Giants, named after famed Giants first baseman Willie McCovey. The proper name for the cove is China Basin, which is the mouth of Mission Creek as it meets the bay. The cove is bounded along the north by Oracle Park, with a ferry landing and a breakwater at the northeast end. The southern shore is lined by China Basin Park and McCovey Point. To the east, it opens up to San Francisco Bay, while the west end of the cove is bounded by the Lefty O'Doul Bridge, named after San Francisco ballplayer and manager Lefty O'Doul.

== Naming ==
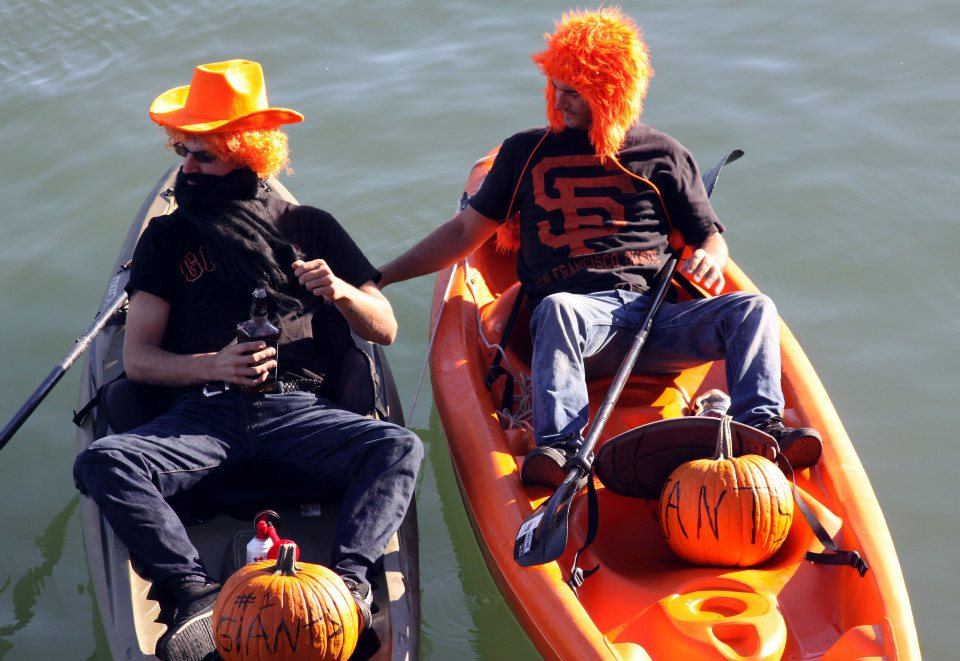
Giants fans on kayaks in McCovey Cove during the 2012 World Series

The name was coined thanks to two sportswriters. Mark Purdy of the San Jose Mercury News wrote an article suggesting naming the body of water after McCovey, though his original suggestions were 'McCovey Channel,' 'McCovey Stream' or 'McCovey Run.' Purdy then noted the more 'lyrical' name of 'McCovey Cove' was suggested by his colleague Leonard Koppett, a writer for the Oakland Tribune. The name did not take long to become very popular, although the moniker has never become official.

== Features ==
On game days, fans take to the water of McCovey Cove in boats and even in kayaks, often with fishing nets in the hope of collecting a home run ball. This echoes what used to happen during McCovey's playing days. Before Candlestick Park's upper deck was extended, the area behind right field was occupied by three small bleacher sections and a lot of open space. Kids in those bleachers would gather behind the right field fence when "Stretch" would come to the plate.

Just beyond the wall is a public waterfront promenade. Across the cove from the ballpark is McCovey Point and China Basin Park, featuring a statue of McCovey at the mouth of the Cove. At his feet are small plaques commemorating the winners of the Willie Mac Award, named in McCovey's honor. Along the southern shore of the cove, between McCovey Point and the O'Doul Bridge, is a walkway featuring plaques showing the Opening Day Roster of every Giants team from 1958 through 1999. Just south of the statue of Willie McCovey is Barry Bonds Junior Giants Field, a t-ball sized baseball diamond. (As of 2020, the features in this area have been temporarily warehoused while extensive construction takes place.)

== Splash hits ==
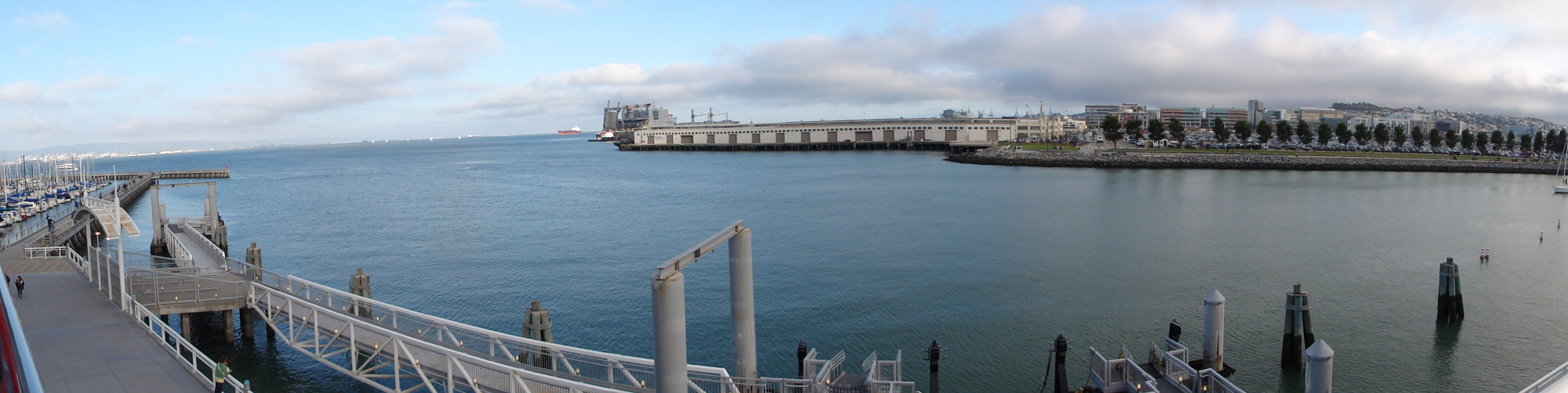
Panoramic view of McCovey Cove, August 2010

A "splash hit" is recorded when a Giants player hits a home run that lands in McCovey Cove on the fly (foul balls, home runs hit by opposing players, and hits that strike or bounce off the stadium wall or pedestrian path are not counted toward this total). These hits are tallied on an electronic counter on the right field wall. As of August 26, 2026, 111 splash hits have been hit into the Bay by 33 Giants players since the park opened; 35 of those were by Barry Bonds. Eight other Giants have reached the Cove more than twice: Brandon Belt (ten), Pablo Sandoval (eight), Mike Yastrzemski (seven), LaMonte Wade Jr. (six), Denard Span (five), Brandon Crawford (four), Joc Pederson (four), and Rafael Devers (three). Five additional players — Felipe Crespo, Michael Tucker, Ryan Klesko, Aubrey Huff, and Andrés Torres — have done it twice. Nineteen other Giants players have accomplished the feat once. Bonds' splash hit on April 17, 2001 marked his 500th career home run. Carlos Beltrán's splash hit on September 14, 2011 marked his 300th career home run. Tyler Colvin's splash hit on May 12, 2014 was also his first hit for the Giants and occurred in his first at bat at Oracle Park since joining the team. Bonds is the only Giants player to hit the Cove twice in the same game, having done so on May 10, 2000 and May 18, 2002. On June 15, 2021, two different Giants players got splash hits in the same game for the first time: Steven Duggar and Mike Yastrzemski.

Two players have gotten splash hits while playing for the Giants and visiting teams. Ryan Klesko got a splash hit on April 9, 2003, while playing for the San Diego Padres before getting two splash hits as a Giants player during the 2007 season. He was joined by Joc Pederson on May 24, 2022, who became the first player to have a splash hit for three different teams, having previously hit two home runs into the water while a member of the Los Angeles Dodgers and the Chicago Cubs.

Five splash hits have been walk-off home runs: Barry Bonds' on August 19, 2003; Brandon Crawford's on April 13, 2014; and Mike Yastrzemski's three splash hits on July 29, 2020, June 19, 2023, and April 9, 2025.

Three splash hits have been grand slams: Bonds' on August 14, 2001, Michael Tucker's on April 9, 2005, and Yastrzemski's on June 15, 2021.

Denard Span and LaMonte Wade Jr. are the only Giants to lead off with a splash hit, doing so on June 13, 2016 and June 2, 2023, respectively.

On September 15, 2024, Heliot Ramos became the first-ever right-handed batter to hit a home run into the water.

Bonds is currently the only Giant to record a splash hit in the postseason. He did so in the fifth inning of Game 3 of the 2002 National League Championship Series on October 12, 2002.

When the stadium hosted the 2007 Major League Baseball Home Run Derby, McCovey Cove was heavily featured in promotional materials, and the namesake slugger presented each participant with special bats before the competition. However, the difficulty of hitting McCovey Cove with a home run was shown, as none of the eight sluggers competing were able to hit the water on the fair side of the foul pole, and all three left-handed batters (who are more likely to hit home runs to right field, and thus, to the Cove) were eliminated in the first round of the contest. Justin Morneau of the Minnesota Twins and Prince Fielder of the Milwaukee Brewers were able to hit the Cove once each, but both of their hits were foul balls. However, Fielder eventually did hit McCovey Cove with a fair ball on July 19, 2008, as the 13th visiting player to hit the 17th non-Giants home run into the Cove. It was also his 100th career home run.

The majority of home runs surrendered into McCovey Cove have been off right-handed pitchers. 23 left-handed pitchers have surrendered a splash hit: Rich Rodriguez, Chuck McElroy, Vic Darensbourg, Brian Anderson, Jeriome Robertson, Chuck Finley, Ted Lilly, Ray King, Doug Davis, Joe Kennedy, Hong-Chih Kuo, Trever Miller, Wandy Rodríguez, Rex Brothers, David Price, Drew Smyly, Ranger Suárez, Matt Strahm, Alex Young, Génesis Cabrera, David Peterson, Ray Kerr, and Nick Lodolo.

Four visiting pitchers have each surrendered two splash hits: John Thomson, Liván Hernández, Rodrigo López, and Chris Paddack. López is the only pitcher to give up a splash hit as a member of two visiting teams while pitching for the Philadelphia Phillies and the Chicago Cubs. No pitcher has surrendered two splash hits in the same game. However, two pitchers have surrendered splash hits to the same player twice: Thomson to Bonds on May 24, 2001 and August 31, 2001; and López to Pablo Sandoval on July 30, 2009 and August 31, 2011.

The most splash hits the Giants have had in a season is 11 in 2001, nine of which were part of Bonds' successful chase to hit the most home runs in a season. On the flip side, the Giants did not hit any splash hits in 2015 (Cody Asche of the Philadelphia Phillies was the only player that season to accomplish the feat). This splash-hit drought lasted nearly two years; after Brandon Belt hit one on September 25, 2014, he would break the drought himself on June 8, 2016.

No.	Hitter	Date	Opponent	Pitcher	Inning
1	Barry Bonds (1)	May 1, 2000	New York Mets	Rich Rodriguez	6th
2	Barry Bonds (2)	May 10, 2000	St. Louis Cardinals	Andy Benes	3rd
3	Barry Bonds (3)	May 10, 2000	St. Louis Cardinals	Heathcliff Slocumb	8th
4	Barry Bonds (4)	May 24, 2000	Montreal Expos	Mike Thurman	3rd
5	Barry Bonds (5)	July 19, 2000	San Diego Padres	Brian Meadows	4th
6	Barry Bonds (6)	September 20, 2000	Cincinnati Reds	Steve Parris	5th
7	Barry Bonds (7)	April 17, 2001	Los Angeles Dodgers	Terry Adams	8th
8	Barry Bonds (8)	April 18, 2001	Los Angeles Dodgers	Chan Ho Park	7th
9	Barry Bonds (9)	May 24, 2001	Colorado Rockies	John Thomson (1)	3rd
10	Felipe Crespo (1)	May 28, 2001	Arizona Diamondbacks	Bret Prinz	10th
11	Barry Bonds (10)	May 30, 2001	Arizona Diamondbacks	Robert Ellis	2nd
12	Barry Bonds (11)	June 12, 2001	Anaheim Angels	Pat Rapp	1st
13	Felipe Crespo (2)	July 8, 2001	Milwaukee Brewers	Curtis Leskanic	9th
14	Barry Bonds (12)	August 4, 2001	Philadelphia Phillies	Nelson Figueroa	6th
15	Barry Bonds (13)	August 14, 2001	Florida Marlins	Ricky Bones	6th
16	Barry Bonds (14)	August 31, 2001	Colorado Rockies	John Thomson (2)	8th
17	Barry Bonds (15)	September 29, 2001	San Diego Padres	Chuck McElroy	6th
18	Barry Bonds (16)	May 13, 2002	Atlanta Braves	Kevin Millwood	3rd
19	Barry Bonds (17)	May 18, 2002	Florida Marlins	Brad Penny	1st
20	Barry Bonds (18)	May 18, 2002	Florida Marlins	Vic Darensbourg	6th
21	Barry Bonds (19)	September 8, 2002	Arizona Diamondbacks	Brian Anderson	4th
22	Barry Bonds (20)	September 28, 2002	Houston Astros	Jeriome Robertson	5th
23	Barry Bonds (21)	October 12, 2002	St. Louis Cardinals	Chuck Finley	5th
24	Barry Bonds (22)	April 14, 2003	Houston Astros	Wade Miller	2nd
25	Barry Bonds (23)	April 30, 2003	Chicago Cubs	Matt Clement	6th
26	J. T. Snow	June 5, 2003	Minnesota Twins	Kyle Lohse	5th
27	Barry Bonds (24)	June 27, 2003	Oakland Athletics	Ted Lilly	6th
28	José Cruz Jr.	July 8, 2003	St. Louis Cardinals	Dan Haren	1st
29	Barry Bonds (25)	August 8, 2003	Philadelphia Phillies	José Mesa	7th
30	Barry Bonds (26)	August 19, 2003	Atlanta Braves	Ray King	10th
31	Barry Bonds (27)	September 13, 2003	Milwaukee Brewers	Doug Davis	8th
32	Barry Bonds (28)	April 12, 2004	Milwaukee Brewers	Matt Kinney	5th
33	Barry Bonds (29)	April 13, 2004	Milwaukee Brewers	Ben Ford	7th
34	Michael Tucker (1)	May 30, 2004	Colorado Rockies	Joe Kennedy	1st
35	A. J. Pierzynski	July 6, 2004	Colorado Rockies	Denny Stark	2nd
36	Barry Bonds (30)	July 30, 2004	St. Louis Cardinals	Chris Carpenter	1st
37	Barry Bonds (31)	August 3, 2004	Cincinnati Reds	Cory Lidle	7th
38	Michael Tucker (2)	April 9, 2005	Colorado Rockies	Scott Dohmann	8th
39	Randy Winn	September 14, 2005	San Diego Padres	Woody Williams	3rd
40	Barry Bonds (32)	September 18, 2005	Los Angeles Dodgers	Hong-Chih Kuo	8th
41	Barry Bonds (33)	August 21, 2006	Arizona Diamondbacks	Liván Hernández (1)	4th
42	Barry Bonds (34)	April 18, 2007	St. Louis Cardinals	Ryan Franklin	8th
43	Ryan Klesko (1)	May 21, 2007	Houston Astros	Trever Miller	8th
44	Ryan Klesko (2)	June 29, 2007	Arizona Diamondbacks	Liván Hernández (2)	6th
45	Barry Bonds (35)	August 8, 2007	Washington Nationals	Tim Redding	1st
46	Fred Lewis	April 26, 2008	Cincinnati Reds	Matt Belisle	5th
47	John Bowker	July 2, 2008	Chicago Cubs	Ryan Dempster	6th
48	Andrés Torres (1)	June 15, 2009	Los Angeles Angels of Anaheim	John Lackey	7th
49	Pablo Sandoval (1)	July 30, 2009	Philadelphia Phillies	Rodrigo López (1)	3rd
50	Pablo Sandoval (2)	August 29, 2009	Colorado Rockies	Jason Marquis	2nd
51	Aubrey Huff (1)	May 1, 2010	Colorado Rockies	Rafael Betancourt	8th
52	Aubrey Huff (2)	June 16, 2010	Baltimore Orioles	Jeremy Guthrie	6th
53	Andrés Torres (2)	July 28, 2010	Florida Marlins	Jorge Sosa	6th
54	Pablo Sandoval (3)	August 12, 2010	Chicago Cubs	Randy Wells	4th
55	Pablo Sandoval (4)	September 30, 2010	Arizona Diamondbacks	Barry Enright	2nd
56	Pablo Sandoval (5)	July 4, 2011	San Diego Padres	Ernesto Frieri	6th
57	Nate Schierholtz	July 8, 2011	New York Mets	R. A. Dickey	6th
58	Pablo Sandoval (6)	August 31, 2011	Chicago Cubs	Rodrigo López (2)	4th
59	Carlos Beltrán	September 14, 2011	San Diego Padres	Mat Latos	6th
60	Brandon Belt (1)	September 27, 2011	Colorado Rockies	Alex White	4th
61	Brandon Belt (2)	June 14, 2012	Houston Astros	Wandy Rodríguez	4th
62	Brandon Belt (3)	September 4, 2012	Arizona Diamondbacks	Ian Kennedy	6th
63	Pablo Sandoval (7)	May 12, 2013	Atlanta Braves	Kris Medlen	3rd
64	Brandon Crawford (1)	April 13, 2014	Colorado Rockies	Rex Brothers	10th
65	Tyler Colvin	May 12, 2014	Atlanta Braves	Gavin Floyd	2nd
66	Brandon Crawford (2)	May 14, 2014	Atlanta Braves	David Carpenter	8th
67	Travis Ishikawa	September 12, 2014	Los Angeles Dodgers	Kevin Correia	7th
68	Brandon Belt (4)	September 25, 2014	San Diego Padres	Andrew Cashner	2nd
69	Brandon Belt (5)	June 8, 2016	Boston Red Sox	David Price	4th
70	Denard Span (1)	June 13, 2016	Milwaukee Brewers	Chase Anderson	1st
71	Denard Span (2)	August 20, 2016	New York Mets	Bartolo Colón	3rd
72	Brandon Belt (6)	May 13, 2017	Cincinnati Reds	Lisalverto Bonilla	1st
73	Brandon Belt (7)	June 10, 2017	Minnesota Twins	José Berríos	1st
74	Denard Span (3)	July 7, 2017	Miami Marlins	Dan Straily	9th
75	Denard Span (4)	July 19, 2017	Cleveland Indians	Carlos Carrasco	5th
76	Denard Span (5)	September 11, 2017	Los Angeles Dodgers	Kenta Maeda	1st
77	Pablo Sandoval (8)	April 4, 2018	Seattle Mariners	Félix Hernández	5th
78	Brandon Belt (8)	May 15, 2018	Cincinnati Reds	Tyler Mahle	4th
79	Stephen Vogt	August 9, 2019	Philadelphia Phillies	Drew Smyly	6th
80	Scooter Gennett	August 11, 2019	Philadelphia Phillies	Ranger Suárez	6th
81	Brandon Belt (9)	August 29, 2019	San Diego Padres	Chris Paddack (1)	4th
82	Mike Yastrzemski (1)	July 29, 2020	San Diego Padres	Matt Strahm	9th
83	Mike Yastrzemski (2)	September 25, 2020	San Diego Padres	Chris Paddack (2)	4th
84	Mike Yastrzemski (3)	April 24, 2021	Miami Marlins	Yimi Garcia	9th
85	Brandon Crawford (3)	April 27, 2021	Colorado Rockies	Daniel Bard	9th
86	Steven Duggar	June 15, 2021	Arizona Diamondbacks	Alex Young	2nd
87	Mike Yastrzemski (4)	June 15, 2021	Arizona Diamondbacks	Humberto Castellanos	8th
88	Brandon Belt (10)	June 19, 2021	Philadelphia Phillies	Aaron Nola	3rd
89	LaMonte Wade Jr. (1)	July 31, 2021	Houston Astros	Zack Greinke	4th
90	Alex Dickerson	August 11, 2021	Arizona Diamondbacks	Tyler Clippard	8th
91	LaMonte Wade Jr. (2)	September 17, 2021	Atlanta Braves	Ian Anderson	4th
92	Jason Vosler	April 30, 2022	Washington Nationals	Erasmo Ramirez	6th
93	Mike Yastrzemski (5)	May 8, 2022	St. Louis Cardinals	Génesis Cabrera	6th
94	Joc Pederson (1)	May 24, 2022	New York Mets	Drew Smith	8th
95	LaMonte Wade Jr. (3)	July 17, 2022	Milwaukee Brewers	Jason Alexander	3rd
96	Joc Pederson (2)	August 30, 2022	San Diego Padres	Nick Martinez	9th
97	Joc Pederson (3)	September 2, 2022	Philadelphia Phillies	Kyle Gibson	2nd
98	LaMonte Wade Jr. (4)	April 8, 2023	Kansas City Royals	Brady Singer	4th
99	Brandon Crawford (4)	April 22, 2023	New York Mets	David Peterson	1st
100	LaMonte Wade Jr. (5)	June 2, 2023	Baltimore Orioles	Dean Kremer	1st
101	Joc Pederson (4)	June 11, 2023	Chicago Cubs	Hayden Wesneski	3rd
102	Mike Yastrzemski (6)	June 19, 2023	San Diego Padres	Ray Kerr	10th
103	Patrick Bailey	April 20, 2024	Arizona Diamondbacks	Zac Gallen	5th
104	LaMonte Wade Jr. (6)	September 4, 2024	Arizona Diamondbacks	Kevin Ginkel	7th
105	Heliot Ramos	September 15, 2024	San Diego Padres	Robert Suárez	9th
106	Mike Yastrzemski (7)	April 9, 2025	Cincinnati Reds	Emilio Pagán	10th
107	Dominic Smith	August 29, 2025	Baltimore Orioles	Corbin Martin	4th
108	Rafael Devers (1)	September 24, 2025	St. Louis Cardinals	Sonny Gray	3rd
109	Bryce Eldridge	July 9, 2026	Colorado Rockies	Ryan Feltner	4th
110	Rafael Devers (2)	August 16, 2026	Colorado Rockies	Gabriel Hughes	2nd
111	Rafael Devers (3)	August 26, 2026	Cincinnati Reds	Nick Lodolo	5th

== Other McCovey Cove hits ==
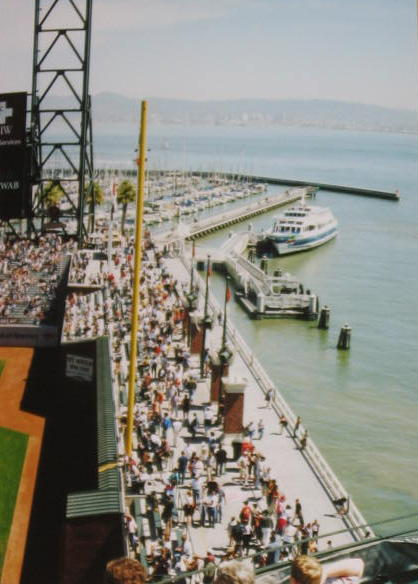
McCovey Cove (2002)

59 non-Giants players have hit the water 72 times. Of the visiting players who have hit McCovey Cove, Carlos Delgado, Adam LaRoche, and Max Muncy have performed the feat the most, doing it three times each. The only visiting players that have done so twice are Luis Gonzalez, Cliff Floyd, Carlos González, Curtis Granderson, Bryce Harper, Joc Pederson, and Jack Suwinski. Suwinski is also the only visiting player to hit the Cove twice in the same game, doing so on May 29, 2023. In that game, Suwinski hit his second home run into the water off of second baseman Brett Wisely, who became the first position player to surrender a splash hit. Seven American League players have hit the Cove: David Ortiz, Mitch Moreland, Adam Dunn, Rougned Odor, Shin-Soo Choo, Nathaniel Lowe, and Josh Naylor. Delgado, LaRoche, Harper, and Pederson are the only four players to have hit home runs into McCovey Cove as members of two visiting teams.

Every National League team has had at least one player hit a home run into McCovey Cove. The last club to have a player hit a ball into the water for the first time was the Cincinnati Reds, doing so in April 2021. Of the 15 American League teams, only four (the Boston Red Sox, the Texas Rangers, the Chicago White Sox, and the Cleveland Guardians) have had a player hit a home run into McCovey Cove. No player for the Houston Astros has hit a home run into McCovey Cove since the Astros moved to the American League in 2013.

Luis Gonzalez' splash hit on May 30, 2002, Dioner Navarro's splash hit on July 20, 2011, and Max Muncy's splash hit on June 9, 2019, are the only three instances where a splash hit accounted for the only run of a game.

Brian Giles of the San Diego Padres is the only visitor to lead off with a splash hit, doing so on August 24, 2008.

Two visiting players have hit a grand slam into McCovey Cove: Michael Harris II of the Atlanta Braves on August 14, 2024 and Lars Nootbaar of the Arizona Diamondbacks on August 29, 2026.

Two visiting players have hit McCovey Cove on the fly in the postseason. Rick Ankiel of the Braves hit the Cove in the 11th inning of Game 2 of the 2010 National League Division Series on October 8, 2010; his run would go on to be the winning run for the Braves. Bryce Harper became the second visitor to hit the water in the postseason in the seventh inning of Game 4 of the 2014 National League Division Series on October 7, 2014, as a member of the Washington Nationals.

Tim Lincecum has surrendered the most splash hits to visitors, having done so five times. The other Giants pitchers to give up multiple splash hits are Johnny Cueto with three and Brett Tomko, Matt Morris, Kevin Correia, Matt Cain, Tim Hudson, Ryan Vogelsong, Hunter Strickland, Madison Bumgarner, Anthony DeSclafani, Spencer Bivens, and Logan Webb twice each. Correia is the only pitcher to have given up a splash hit both as a Giant and as a visiting pitcher while pitching for the Los Angeles Dodgers in 2014.

Two Giants pitchers have surrendered splash hits to the same visiting player twice each: Morris to Carlos Delgado on April 26, 2006, and May 9, 2007 and Lincecum to Adam LaRoche on August 11, 2007, and August 27, 2010.

Players from the Giants and visiting teams have hit home runs into McCovey Cove in the same game four times: on May 28, 2001 (Felipe Crespo and Mark Grace); May 12, 2014 (Tyler Colvin and Freddie Freeman); August 9, 2019 (Stephen Vogt and Bryce Harper); and August 26, 2026 (Rafael Devers and Héctor Rodríguez).

Daulton Varsho's splash hit on September 5, 2020 marked his first MLB career home run. Charlie Blackmon's splash hit on June 7, 2022 marked his 200th career home run.

On October 4, 2024, John "JT" Taylor of the BaseballBatBros YouTube channel hit the Cove twice during the filming of a home run derby video at Oracle Park. The first splash hit occurred with a Louisville Slugger RA13 maple bat, and the second with a 2016 Easton Mako XL USSSA bat. On July 10, 2025, BaseballBatBros returned to Oracle Park to film a video of JT's brother, Will, attempting to recreate two iconic Giants home runs: Andrés Galarraga's 495-foot home run that reached the Coca-Cola bottle in deep left field in 2001 (the farthest home run ever hit at Oracle Park) and Barry Bonds' all-time record-breaking 756th career home run that landed behind Triples Alley in right center field in 2007. Will's attempts to replicate the home runs were unsuccessful, but he successfully recorded a splash hit at the end of the video.

On March 24, 2025, Riley Greene of the Detroit Tigers hit the water during a preseason game, but this would not be counted toward his career home run total.

On July 11, 2025, Shohei Ohtani of the Dodgers became the first pitcher to hit a home run into the Cove, although he was in the lineup as the designated hitter in that game.

No.	Hitter	Team	Date	Pitcher	Inning
1	Todd Hundley	Los Angeles Dodgers	June 30, 2000	Robb Nen	9th
2	Luis Gonzalez (1)	Arizona Diamondbacks	September 23, 2000	Shawn Estes	1st
3	Mark Grace	Arizona Diamondbacks	May 28, 2001	Tim Worrell	12th
4	Luis Gonzalez (2)	Arizona Diamondbacks	May 30, 2002	Kirk Rueter	4th
5	Ryan Klesko	San Diego Padres	April 9, 2003	Ryan Jensen	3rd
6	Hee-Seop Choi	Florida Marlins	April 30, 2004	Kevin Correia (1)	2nd
7	Corey Patterson	Chicago Cubs	August 7, 2004	Tyler Walker	6th
8	Cliff Floyd (1)	New York Mets	August 21, 2004	Brett Tomko (1)	5th
9	Russell Branyan	Milwaukee Brewers	April 23, 2005	Brett Tomko (2)	4th
10	Larry Walker	St. Louis Cardinals	July 8, 2005	Jason Schmidt	1st
11	Carlos Delgado (1)	Florida Marlins	July 23, 2005	Brad Hennessey	5th
12	Cliff Floyd (2)	New York Mets	April 25, 2006	Jamey Wright	8th
13	Carlos Delgado (2)	New York Mets	April 26, 2006	Matt Morris (1)	3rd
14	Carlos Delgado (3)	New York Mets	May 9, 2007	Matt Morris (2)	4th
15	Adam LaRoche (1)	Pittsburgh Pirates	August 11, 2007	Tim Lincecum (1)	4th
16	Lance Berkman	Houston Astros	May 15, 2008	Vinnie Chulk	9th
17	Prince Fielder	Milwaukee Brewers	July 19, 2008	Osiris Matos	7th
18	Brian Giles	San Diego Padres	August 24, 2008	Kevin Correia (2)	1st
19	Miguel Montero	Arizona Diamondbacks	September 29, 2009	Jonathan Sánchez	6th
20	David Ortiz	Boston Red Sox	June 27, 2010	Tim Lincecum (2)	1st
21	Adam LaRoche (2)	Arizona Diamondbacks	August 27, 2010	Tim Lincecum (3)	1st
22	Adam LaRoche (3)	Arizona Diamondbacks	August 28, 2010	Sergio Romo	9th
23	Rick Ankiel	Atlanta Braves	October 8, 2010	Ramón Ramírez	11th
24	Dioner Navarro	Los Angeles Dodgers	July 20, 2011	Tim Lincecum (4)	7th
25	Mitch Moreland	Texas Rangers	June 9, 2012	Ryan Vogelsong (1)	8th
26	Brian McCann	Atlanta Braves	May 10, 2013	Matt Cain (1)	5th
27	Carlos González (1)	Colorado Rockies	May 25, 2013	Barry Zito	1st
28	Garrett Jones	Pittsburgh Pirates	August 22, 2013	Matt Cain (2)	2nd
29	Carlos González (2)	Colorado Rockies	April 11, 2014	Madison Bumgarner (1)	3rd
30	Yasmani Grandal	San Diego Padres	April 30, 2014	Tim Hudson (1)	9th
31	Freddie Freeman	Atlanta Braves	May 12, 2014	Javier López	9th
32	Curtis Granderson (1)	New York Mets	June 8, 2014	Tim Lincecum (5)	6th
33	Adam Dunn	Chicago White Sox	August 13, 2014	Jake Peavy	4th
34	Corey Dickerson	Colorado Rockies	August 27, 2014	Tim Hudson (2)	5th
35	Ender Inciarte	Arizona Diamondbacks	September 9, 2014	Yusmeiro Petit	4th
36	Bryce Harper (1)	Washington Nationals	October 7, 2014	Hunter Strickland (1)	7th
37	Cody Asche	Philadelphia Phillies	July 11, 2015	Ryan Vogelsong (2)	6th
38	Ben Zobrist	Chicago Cubs	May 20, 2016	George Kontos	8th
39	Joc Pederson (1)	Los Angeles Dodgers	June 12, 2016	Hunter Strickland (2)	7th
40	Curtis Granderson (2)	New York Mets	August 19, 2016	Johnny Cueto (1)	2nd
41	Chase Utley	Los Angeles Dodgers	September 12, 2017	Johnny Cueto (2)	4th
42	Cody Bellinger	Los Angeles Dodgers	September 13, 2017	Matt Moore	5th
43	Matt Carpenter	St. Louis Cardinals	July 8, 2018	Ray Black	8th
44	Rougned Odor	Texas Rangers	August 24, 2018	Will Smith	9th
45	Max Muncy (1)	Los Angeles Dodgers	September 30, 2018	Chris Stratton	5th
46	Max Muncy (2)	Los Angeles Dodgers	June 9, 2019	Madison Bumgarner (2)	1st
47	Michael Conforto	New York Mets	July 21, 2019	Conner Menez	2nd
48	Robel García	Chicago Cubs	July 22, 2019	Shaun Anderson	2nd
49	Bryce Harper (2)	Philadelphia Phillies	August 9, 2019	Tony Watson	7th
50	Shin-Soo Choo	Texas Rangers	August 2, 2020	Jeff Samardzija	5th
51	Daulton Varsho	Arizona Diamondbacks	September 5, 2020	Trevor Gott	7th
52	Joey Votto	Cincinnati Reds	April 12, 2021	Jarlin García	6th
53	Mike Moustakas	Cincinnati Reds	April 13, 2021	Kevin Gausman	1st
54	Jake Cronenworth	San Diego Padres	May 9, 2021	Johnny Cueto (3)	2nd
55	Max Muncy (3)	Los Angeles Dodgers	May 22, 2021	Scott Kazmir	1st
56	Joc Pederson (2)	Chicago Cubs	June 3, 2021	Anthony DeSclafani (1)	3rd
57	Charlie Blackmon	Colorado Rockies	June 7, 2022	José Álvarez	6th
58	Bryson Stott	Philadelphia Phillies	September 3, 2022	Jakob Junis	4th
59	Jack Suwinski (1)	Pittsburgh Pirates	May 29, 2023	Anthony DeSclafani (2)	7th
60	Jack Suwinski (2)	Pittsburgh Pirates	May 29, 2023	Brett Wisely	9th
61	Nathaniel Lowe	Texas Rangers	August 11, 2023	Ross Stripling	6th
62	Josh Naylor	Cleveland Guardians	September 11, 2023	Alex Cobb	3rd
63	Michael Harris II	Atlanta Braves	August 14, 2024	Robbie Ray	1st
64	Kyle Schwarber	Philadelphia Phillies	July 8, 2025	Spencer Bivens (1)	7th
65	Shohei Ohtani	Los Angeles Dodgers	July 11, 2025	Logan Webb (1)	3rd
66	Ronny Mauricio	New York Mets	July 27, 2025	Randy Rodríguez	7th
67	Gavin Sheets	San Diego Padres	May 6, 2026	Adrian Houser	4th
68	Michael Busch	Chicago Cubs	June 12, 2026	Erik Miller	5th
69	Zac Veen	Colorado Rockies	August 14, 2026	Landen Roupp	6th
70	Héctor Rodríguez	Cincinnati Reds	August 26, 2026	Spencer Bivens (2)	9th
71	Lars Nootbaar	Arizona Diamondbacks	August 29, 2026	Ryan Walker	7th
72	Alec Burleson	St. Louis Cardinals	September 7, 2026	Logan Webb (2)	6th
