= Mike Yastrzemski =

American baseball player (born 1990)

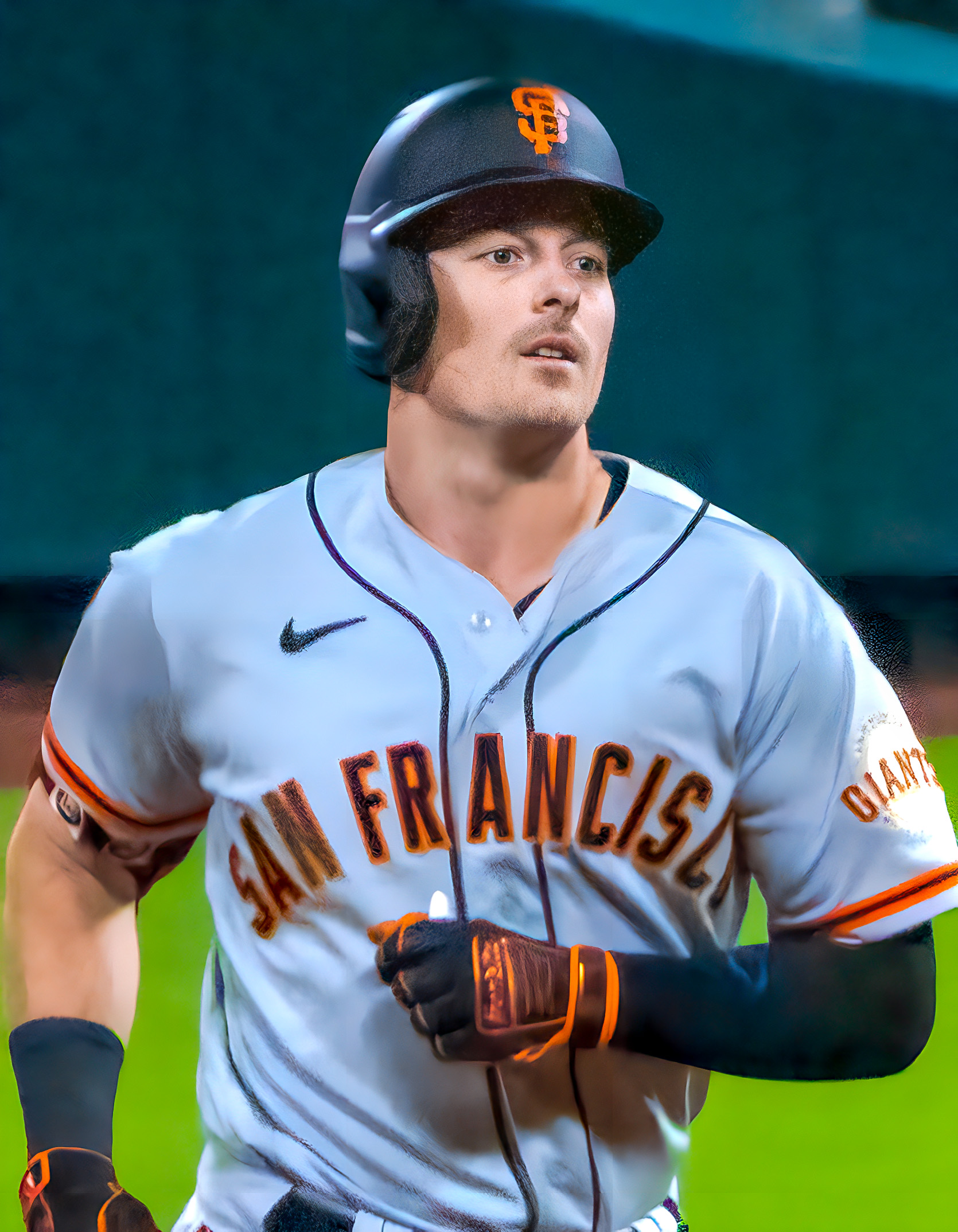
- Yastrzemski with the San Francisco Giants in 2023

Atlanta Braves – No. 18
- Outfielder
- Born: August 23, 1990 (age 36); Andover, Massachusetts, U.S.
- Bats: Left Throws: Left

MLB debut
- May 25, 2019, for the San Francisco Giants

MLB statistics (through 2026 season)
- Batting average: .236
- Home runs: 135
- Runs batted in: 405
- Stats at Baseball Reference

Teams
- San Francisco Giants (2019–2025); Kansas City Royals (2025); Atlanta Braves (2026–present)

Michael Andrew Yastrzemski (/jəˈstrɛmski/ yə-STREM-skee; born August 23, 1990), nicknamed "Yaz", is an American professional baseball outfielder for the Atlanta Braves of Major League Baseball (MLB). He has previously played in MLB for the San Francisco Giants and Kansas City Royals. Yastrzemski played college baseball for the Vanderbilt Commodores, and was selected by the Baltimore Orioles in the 14th round of the 2013 MLB draft. He made his MLB debut in 2019 with the Giants. He is the grandson of Baseball Hall of Famer Carl Yastrzemski.

== Early life ==
Yastrzemski attended St. John's Preparatory School in Danvers, Massachusetts. He played for the school's baseball team, and was named team captain in his senior year. He committed to attend Vanderbilt University, on a college baseball scholarship. Seen as a potential early-round selection in the 2009 Major League Baseball (MLB) draft, Yastrzemski indicated that he would attend college unless chosen in the first round. The Boston Red Sox selected him in the 36th round (1,098th overall), and he did not sign with the team, instead enrolling at Vanderbilt to play for the Vanderbilt Commodores baseball team.

== College career ==
Yastrzemski became a starter for the Commodores in the middle of his freshman year. In 2010 and 2011, he played collegiate summer baseball with the Cotuit Kettleers of the Cape Cod Baseball League. After his junior year, the Seattle Mariners selected him in the 30th round (911th overall) of the 2012 MLB draft. The Mariners offered Yastrzemski a $300,000 signing bonus, well above the suggested bonus for a player chosen in that round. Yastrzemski chose not to sign, and returned to Vanderbilt for his senior year. As a senior, Yastrzemski was named All-Southeastern Conference.

== Professional career ==
=== Baltimore Orioles (2013–2018) ===
==== Minor leagues ====
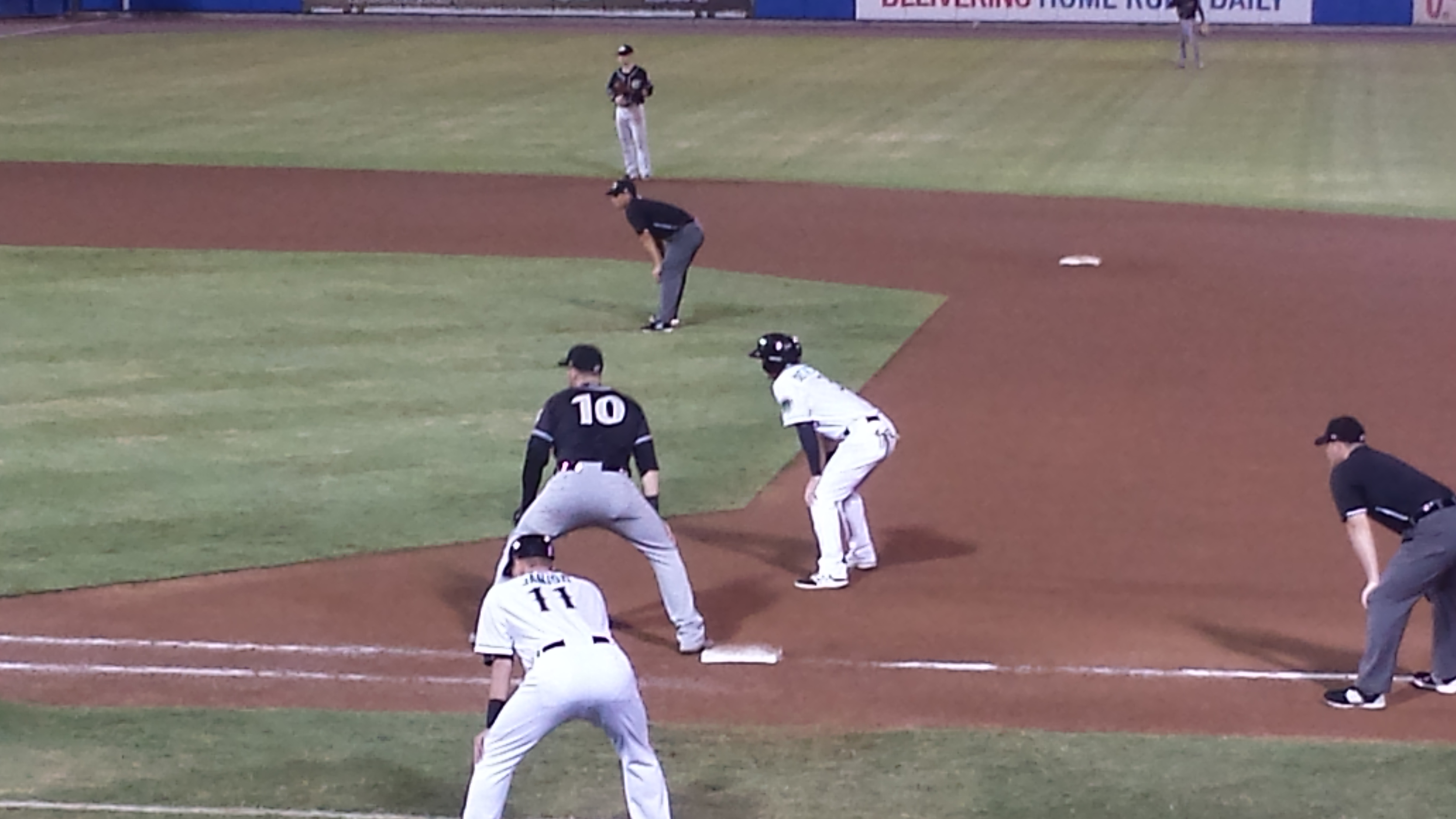
Yastrzemski on first base at Harbor Park in a game with the Norfolk Tides in 2016

The Baltimore Orioles selected Yastrzemski in the 14th round (429th overall) of the 2013 Major League Baseball draft, and he signed. After signing, Yastrzemski began his professional career with the Aberdeen IronBirds of the Low-A New York–Penn League (NY-P), where he had a .273 batting average, three home runs, and 25 runs batted in (RBI). He was an NY-P mid-season All Star, and appeared in the NY-P all-star game.

Yastrzemski began the 2014 season with the Delmarva Shorebirds of the Single-A South Atlantic League (SAL), where he led the league with 10 triples and batted .306/.365/.554 (5th in the league) with 10 home runs and 44 RBI. He was an SAL mid-season All Star, and appeared in the SAL all-star game. After the all-star game, Yastrzemski was promoted to the Frederick Keys of the High-A Carolina League, where he batted .312 in 93 at-bats. He was then promoted again, to the Bowie Baysox of the Double-A Eastern League. Between Frederick and Bowie, Yastrzemski combined to bat .288 with 14 home runs, 18 stolen bases in 24 attempts, and 18 triples, which led all of Minor League Baseball. He was an MiLB Orioles organization All-Star.

Yastrzemski spent the 2015 season with Bowie, where he batted .246 with six home runs and 59 RBI. He was a 2015 Eastern League All-Star. Yastrzemski spent 2016 with both Bowie and the Norfolk Tides of the Triple-A International League, where he posted combined statistics of a .234 batting average, with 13 home runs, and 59 RBI.

Yastrzemski underwent surgery after the 2016 season and was not healthy for the beginning of the 2017 season. During the 2017 season, he was with the Tides for 81 games between May and September, except for several weeks in June and July when he played 20 games with the Baysox. He returned to Norfolk in 2018. He was an MiLB Orioles organization All-Star.

The Orioles invited Yastrzemski to spring training as a non-roster player in 2019.

=== San Francisco Giants (2019–2025) ===
On March 22, 2019, the Orioles traded Yastrzemski to the San Francisco Giants in exchange for minor league pitcher Tyler Herb. He was assigned to the Sacramento River Cats of the Triple-A Pacific Coast League to start the 2019 season, for whom he batted .316/.414/.676 with 38 runs, 12 home runs and 25 RBI in 136 at-bats.

==== 2019 ====
The Giants promoted Yastrzemski to the Major Leagues on May 25, 2019, and he made his debut the same day, going 0-for-3 with a run scored in a 10–4 loss to the Arizona Diamondbacks. He collected his first career hit, a single, the following day but was thrown out returning to first base and went 3-for-4 with a run scored in the Giants' 6–2 loss. Yastrzemski hit his first career home run against his former organization, the Baltimore Orioles, off Andrew Cashner on May 31. On August 16, he hit three home runs against the Arizona Diamondbacks at Chase Field, including the game-winning home run in the top of the 11th inning. On September 17, he hit his 20th home run, a solo shot to the center field bleachers, in his first game at Fenway Park, where his grandfather played his entire 23-year MLB career. The Giants won 7–6 in 15 innings. The next game, in front of a Boston Red Sox crowd, Yastrzemski caught the ceremonial first pitch from his grandfather.

For the 2019 season, Yastrzemski played in 107 games while batting .272/.334/.518 with 21 home runs, 55 RBIs, and 64 runs scored in 371 at bats. His 21 home runs tied Kevin Pillar for the most on the team. He was the first rookie since Dave Kingman in 1972 to hit more than 20 home runs for the Giants.

==== 2020–2021 ====
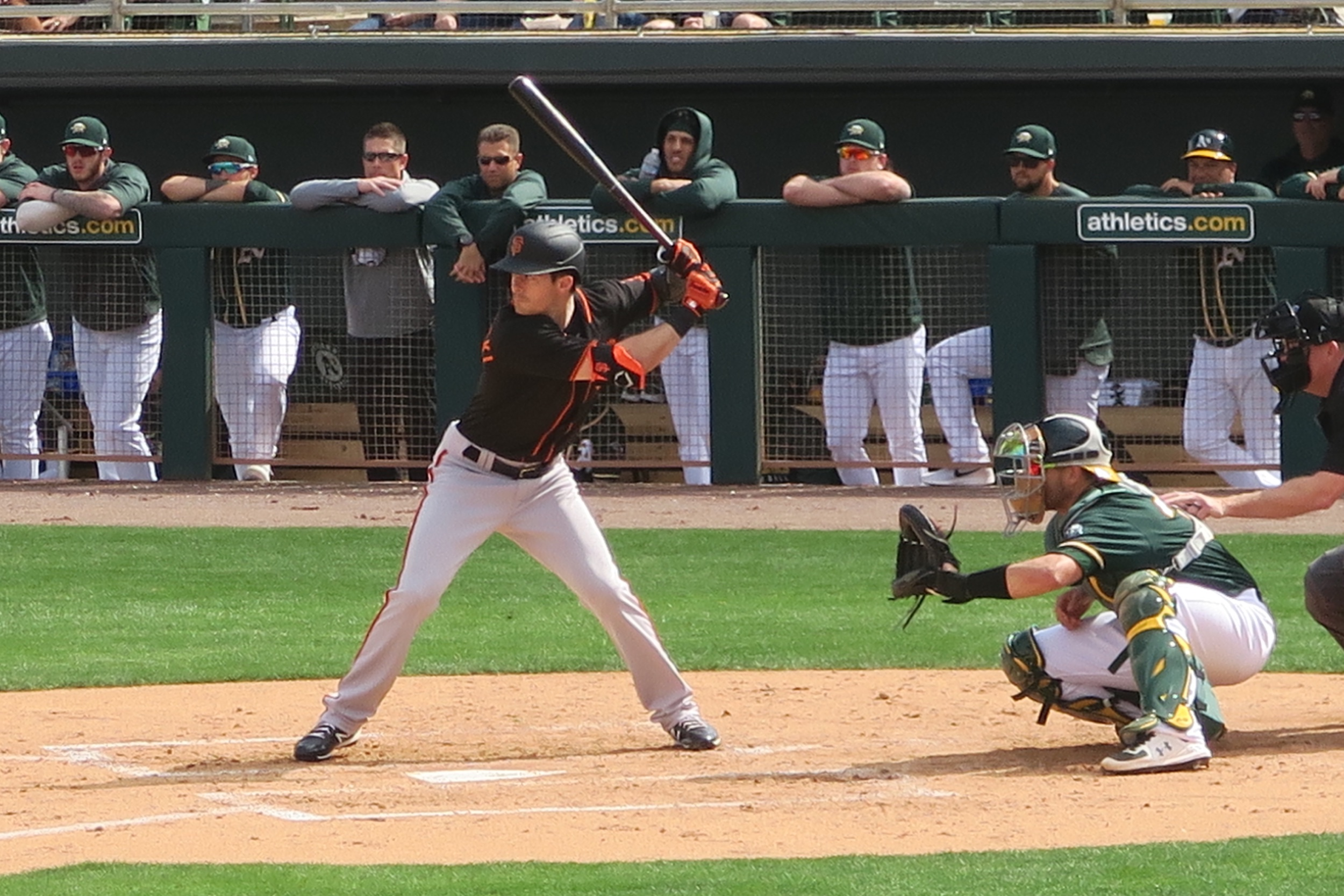
Yastrzemski batting in 2020

On September 9, 2020, he hit his 30th home run in his 151st game. Yastrzemski joined Bobby Thomson and Dave Kingman as the only other Giants to hit 30 home runs so quickly in their careers. Yastrzemski finished the pandemic-shortened 2020 season batting .297/.400/.568 with 10 home runs and leading the team in RBIs with 35. He led the NL in triples (4) and range factor/9 IP as a right fielder (2.38), and was 8th in OPS (.968), 9th in doubles (14), and 10th in OBP (.400).

Yastrzemski received All-MLB second team honors for his performance during the season. He was 8th in voting for NL MVP and won the Willie Mac Award for being the Giants' most inspirational player.

On June 15, 2021, at Oracle Park, in a 9–8 win over the Arizona Diamondbacks, with the Giants trailing 8–5 in the eighth inning with two outs and having earlier trailed 7–0, Yastrzemski hit his first career grand slam, a go-ahead home run off of Humberto Castellanos into McCovey Cove for a "Splash Hit".

In the 2021 regular season, Yastrzemski batted .224/.311/.457 with 28 doubles, 25 home runs, and 71 RBIs in 468 at bats. He had a 2.26 range factor per 9 innings as a right fielder, leading the National League for the second season in a row. He was one of three nominees for a National League Gold Glove Award in right field, losing to Adam Duvall.

==== 2022–2025 ====
Eligible for salary arbitration for the first time, Yastrzemski and the Giants agreed to a $3.7 million salary for the 2022 season. In 2022, Yastrzemski batted .214/.305/.392 in 485 at bats, with 73 runs, 31 doubles (a career high), 17 home runs, and 57 RBIs, stealing five bases in six attempts. He played 104 games in right field, 93 games in center field, and one game at DH. In November, Yastrzemski and the Giants agreed on a one-year, $6.1 million contract for the 2023 season.

Yastrzemski and the Giants agreed to a $7.9 million salary for the 2024 season.

On September 1, 2024, at Oracle Park, against the Miami Marlins, Yastrzemski hit his 100th career home run, making his grandfather and himself the fourth grandfather-grandson duo in Major League history to each hit at least 100 career home runs. He made 140 appearances for San Francisco during the regular season, slashing .231/.302/.437 with 18 home runs and 57 RBI.

Yastrzemski signed a contract with the Giants for 2025 valued at $9.25 million, avoiding salary arbitration. In 96 games for the Giants, he batted .231/.330/.355 with eight home runs, 28 RBI, and six stolen bases.

=== Kansas City Royals (2025) ===
On July 31, 2025, the Giants traded Yastrzemski to the Kansas City Royals in exchange for Yunior Marte. Yastrzemski made 50 appearances for the Royals, batting .237/.339/.500 with nine home runs, 18 RBI, and one stolen base.

=== Atlanta Braves (2026–present) ===
On December 10, 2025, Yastrzemski signed a two-year contract with the Atlanta Braves worth up to $23 million.

== Personal life ==
Yastrzemski grew up in Andover, Massachusetts. His father, Carl Jr. (who went by Mike), played college baseball for the Florida State Seminoles baseball team, was drafted by the Atlanta Braves in the 3rd round of the 1984 MLB January Draft-Secondary Phase, and played professionally in the minor leagues from 1984 to 1988. His father and mother, Anne-Marie, divorced when he was six years old. Carl Jr. died in 2004 at the age of 43 from a blood clot after having hip surgery. Mike's grandfather, Carl Yastrzemski, is a member of the National Baseball Hall of Fame and began teaching Mike hitting during his grandson's freshman year in high school.

Yastrzemski met Paige (née Cahill) at Vanderbilt. They married in November 2018 and have two children, a daughter and a son.
