= Willie Mac Award =

Baseball award named in honor of Willie McCovey

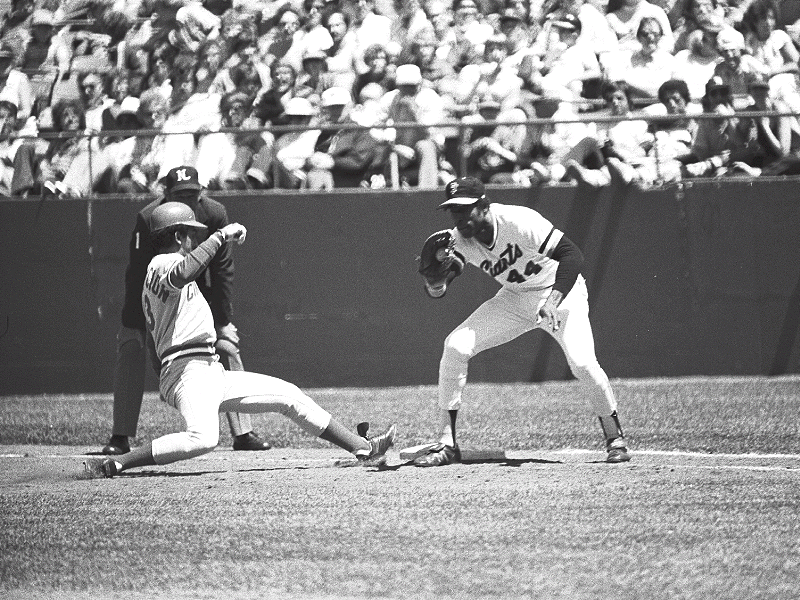
Willie McCovey (44), for whom the award was named.

The Willie Mac Award is named in honor of Willie McCovey. It has been presented annually since 1980 to the most inspirational player on the San Francisco Giants, as voted upon by Giants players, coaches, training staff, and more recently, Giants fans. McCovey personally presented the winner with the award in a pregame ceremony at AT&T Park near the conclusion of each season until his death on October 31, 2018.

== Winners ==
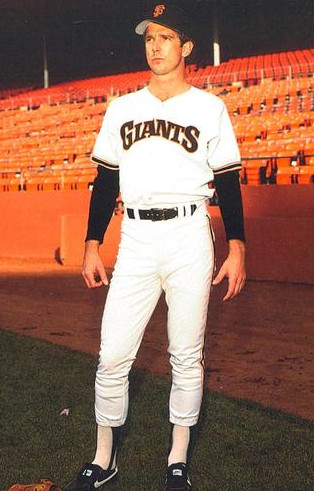
Mike Krukow

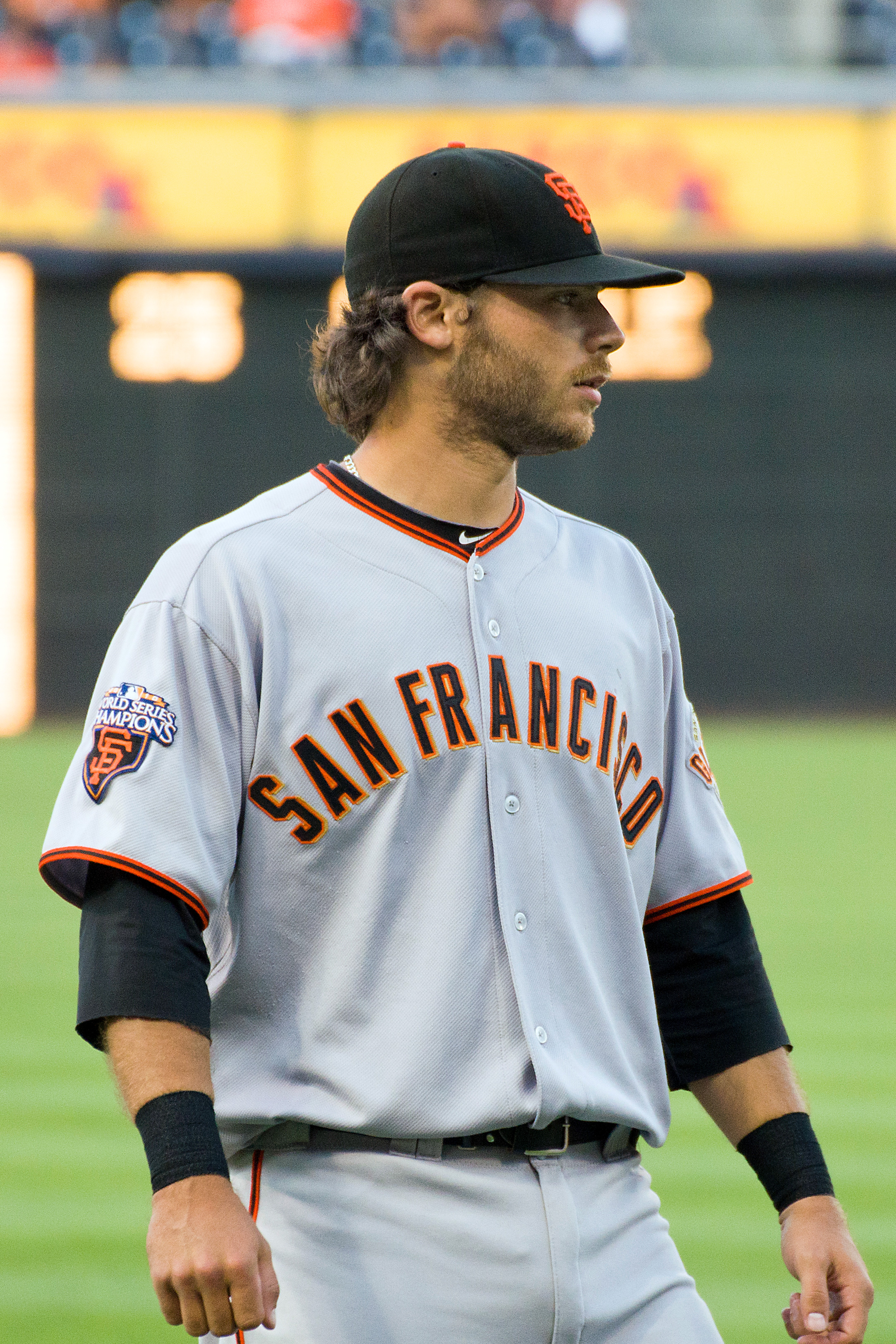
Brandon Crawford

Year	Player	Position
1980	Jack Clark	RF
1981	Larry Herndon	LF
1982	Joe Morgan	2B
1983	Darrell Evans	1B
1984	Bob Brenly	C
1985	Mike Krukow (1)	P
1986	Mike Krukow (2)	P
1987	Chris Speier	2B
1988	José Uribe	SS
1989	Dave Dravecky	P
1990	Steve Bedrosian	P
1991	Robby Thompson	2B
1992	Mike Felder	CF
1993	Kirt Manwaring	C
1994	(not awarded due to strike)	
1995	Mark Leiter	P
1995	Mark Carreon	1B
1996	Shawon Dunston	SS
1997	J. T. Snow (1)	1B
1998	Jeff Kent	2B
1999	Marvin Benard	CF
2000	Ellis Burks	RF
2001	Mark Gardner	P
2001	Benito Santiago	C
2002	David Bell	3B
2003	Marquis Grissom	CF
2004	J. T. Snow (2)	1B
2005	Mike Matheny	C
2006	Omar Vizquel	SS
2007	Bengie Molina (1)	C
2008	Bengie Molina (2)	C
2009	Matt Cain	P
2010	Andrés Torres	CF
2011	Ryan Vogelsong	P
2012	Buster Posey	C
2013	Hunter Pence	RF
2014	Madison Bumgarner	P
2015	Matt Duffy	3B
2016	Javier López	P
2016	Brandon Crawford	SS
2017	Nick Hundley	C
2018	Will Smith	P
2019	Kevin Pillar	CF
2020	Mike Yastrzemski	RF
2021	LaMonte Wade Jr.	LF
2022	Wilmer Flores	2B
2023	Thairo Estrada	2B
2024	Matt Chapman	3B
2025	Willy Adames	SS
2026	Logan Webb	P

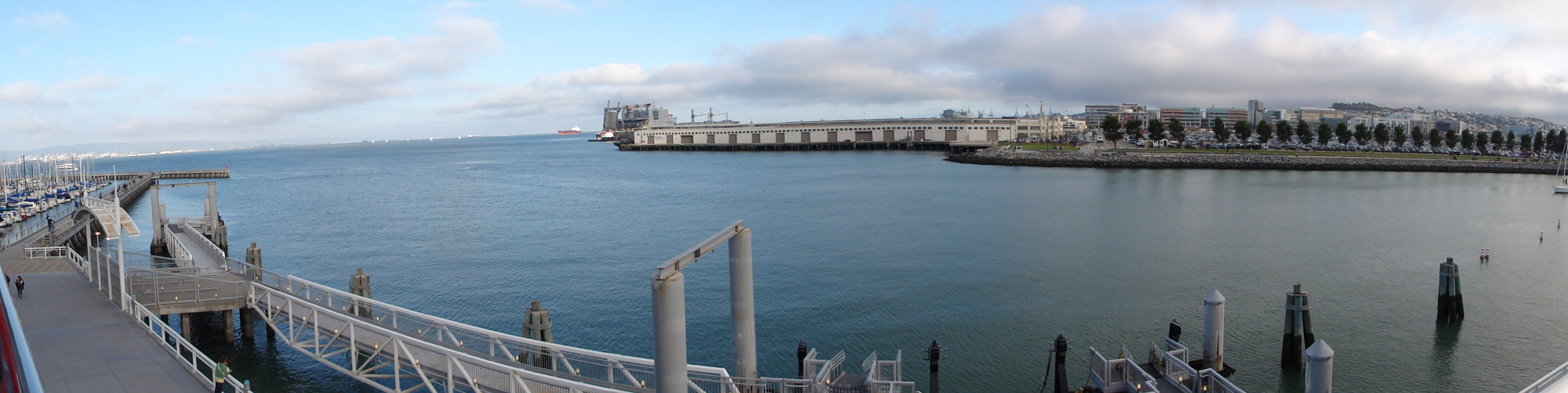
Panoramic view of McCovey Cove, August 2010

Plaques with the names of each winner are placed in the ground surrounding the statue of Willie McCovey on the southern shore of China Basin, unofficially known as McCovey Cove.

Matt Duffy was the first rookie winner of the award.

== Similar MLB awards involving Giants players ==
The Hutch Award is for the "active player who best exemplifies the fighting spirit and competitive desire to win". Only Omar Vizquel and Dave Dravecky have won both the Willie Mac Award and the Hutch Award, although Willie McCovey won the Hutch Award in 1977.

Vizquel was a finalist in 2007 for the MLBPAA Heart & Hustle Award, which honors the player who "best embodies the values, spirit and tradition of the game".

== See also ==
- Baseball awards#Awards given to members of specific teams
