= LaMonte Wade Jr. =

American baseball player (born 1994)

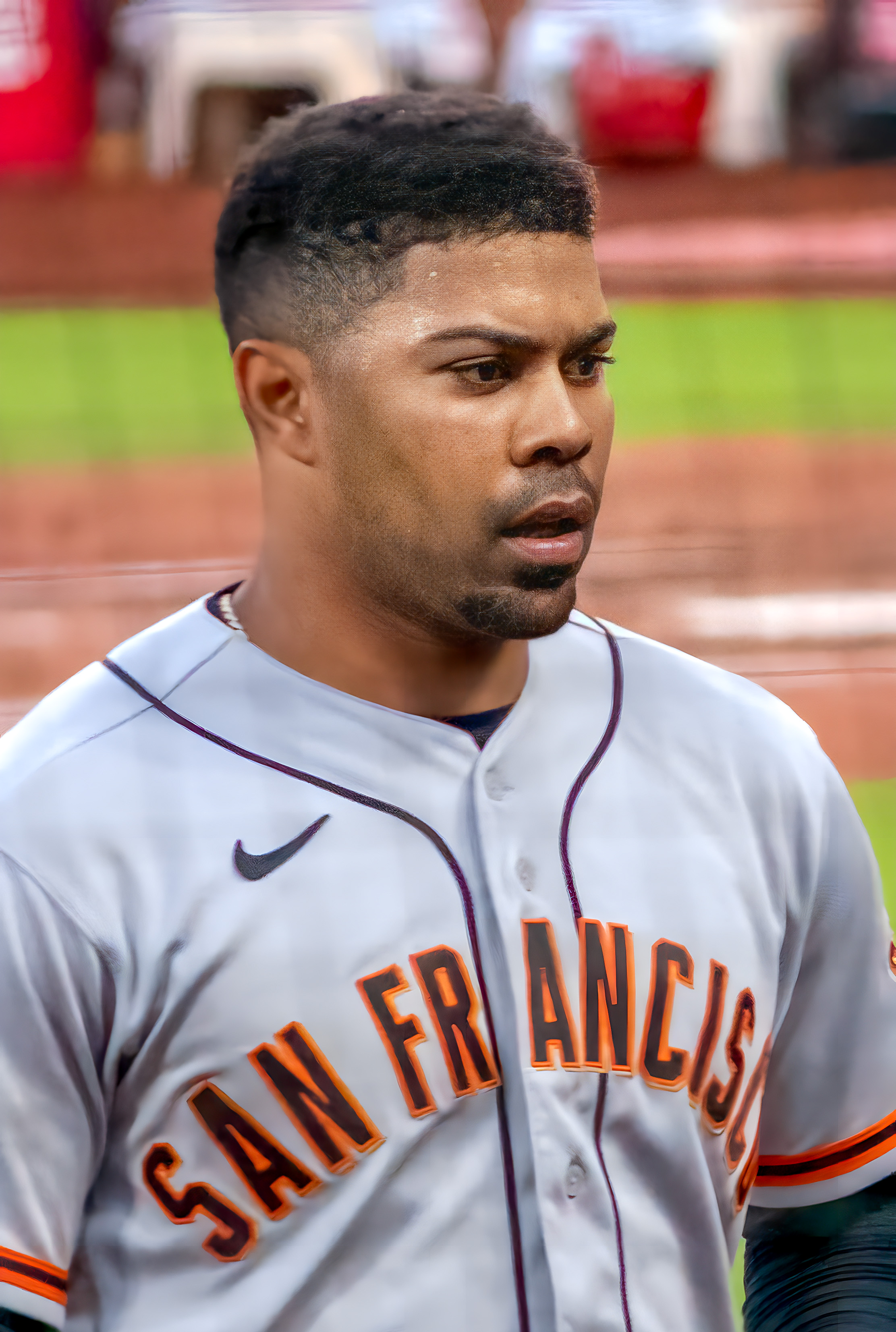
- Wade with the Giants 2023

Free agent
- Outfielder / First baseman
- Born: January 1, 1994 (age 32); Baltimore, Maryland, U.S.
- Bats: Left Throws: Left

MLB debut
- June 28, 2019, for the Minnesota Twins

MLB statistics (through 2026 season)
- Batting average: .233
- Home runs: 59
- Runs batted in: 204
- Stats at Baseball Reference

Teams
- Minnesota Twins (2019–2020); San Francisco Giants (2021–2025); Los Angeles Angels (2025); Houston Astros (2026)

LaMonte Aaron Wade Jr. (born January 1, 1994), nicknamed "Late Night LaMonte," is an American professional baseball first baseman who is a free agent. He has played in Major League Baseball (MLB) for the Minnesota Twins, San Francisco Giants, Los Angeles Angels, and Houston Astros. He played college baseball for the Maryland Terrapins. The Twins selected Wade in the ninth round of the 2015 MLB draft, and made his MLB debut with them in 2019.

== Amateur career ==
Wade attended St. Paul's School in Brooklandville, Maryland. He played baseball and basketball. In baseball he played outfield and pitched. He was named to the All-Maryland Interscholastic Athletic Association team in 2010, 2011, and 2012, to the 2011 and 2012 Maryland State Association of Baseball Coaches Preseason All-State team, and to the 2011 Baltimore Sun All-Metro Second Team. He was also named to the 2012 Preseason Under Armour All-American Team and the 2012 Baltimore Sun All-Metro First Team, and was ranked the No. 1 prospect in the class of 2012 in Maryland by Dynamic Baseball.

He then attended the University of Maryland, College Park, where he played college baseball for the Maryland Terrapins. He played as a first baseman in his freshman year, but then became a center fielder. In 2015 he batted .335/.453 (2nd in the Big Ten Conference)/.468. For the Terrapins, Wade had a .394 on-base percentage in three seasons, walking more times than he struck out. In 2014, he played collegiate summer baseball with the Brewster Whitecaps of the Cape Cod Baseball League.

== Professional career ==
=== Minnesota Twins (2015–20) ===
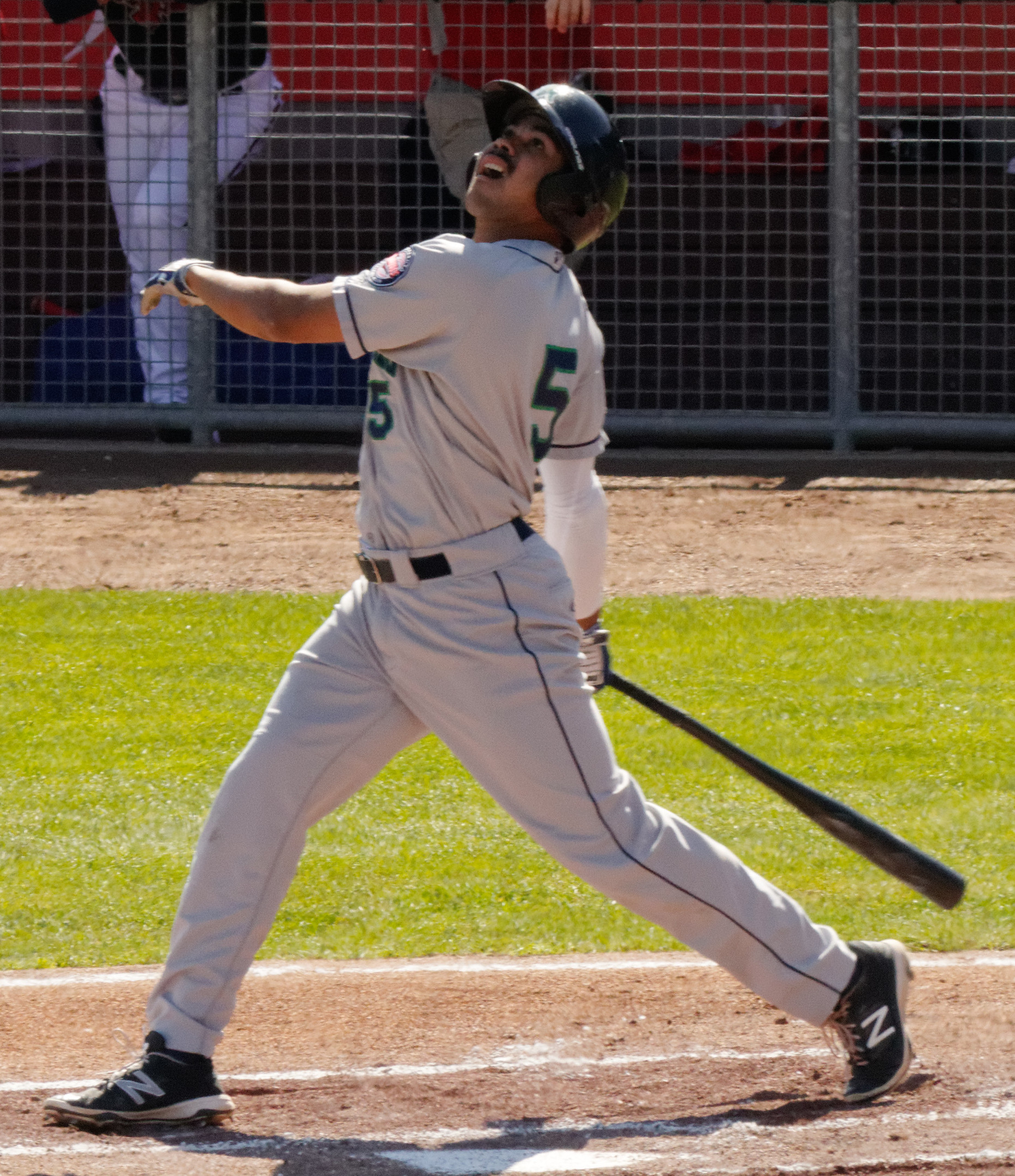
Wade with the Cedar Rapids Kernels in 2016

The Minnesota Twins selected Wade in the ninth round, with the 260th overall selection, of the 2015 MLB draft. He agreed to a contract which contained a signing bonus of $163,800. He made his professional debut with the Elizabethton Twins of the Rookie-level Appalachian League, batted .312/.428 (6th in the league)/.506 with a .934 OPS (7th) and 46 walks (2nd), 5 triples (3rd), 9 home runs (6th), 44 RBIs (4th), and 12 stolen bases (8th), and was an Appalachian League post-season All Star. He was promoted to the Cedar Rapids Kernels of the Single–A Midwest League in the final week of the season.

Wade began the 2016 season with Cedar Rapids. He started in the 2016 Midwest League All-Star Game. Following the All-Star Game, the Twins promoted Wade to the Fort Myers Miracle of the High–A Florida State League. Wade finished 2016 batting .293/.402/.438 with eight home runs and 51 runs batted in (RBIs). He was an MILB.com organization All Star.

Wade spent the 2017 season with the Chattanooga Lookouts of the Double–A Southern League, where he batted .292./.397 (10th in the league)/.408 with 74 runs (6th), seven home runs, and 67 RBIs (7th), while leading the league with 11 sacrifice flies, coming in second with five intentional walks, and drawing 76 walks (third in the league). He was a Southern League mid-season All Star. After the season, the Twins assigned Wade to the Surprise Saguaros of the Arizona Fall League.

Wade began the 2018 season in Chattanooga. He was a Southern League mid-season All Star. He was promoted to the Rochester Red Wings of the Triple–A International League in June. The Twins added Wade to their 40-man roster after the 2018 season. He opened the 2019 season back with Rochester.

On June 27, 2019, the Twins promoted Wade to the major leagues. He made his major league debut on June 28 versus the Chicago White Sox. In 2019 for the Twins he batted .196/.348/.375 with 10 runs, 2 home runs, and 5 RBIs in 56 at bats, playing primarily center field. In 2020 for the Twins he batted .231/.318/.308 with three runs, no home runs, and one RBI in 39 at bats.

=== San Francisco Giants (2021–2025) ===
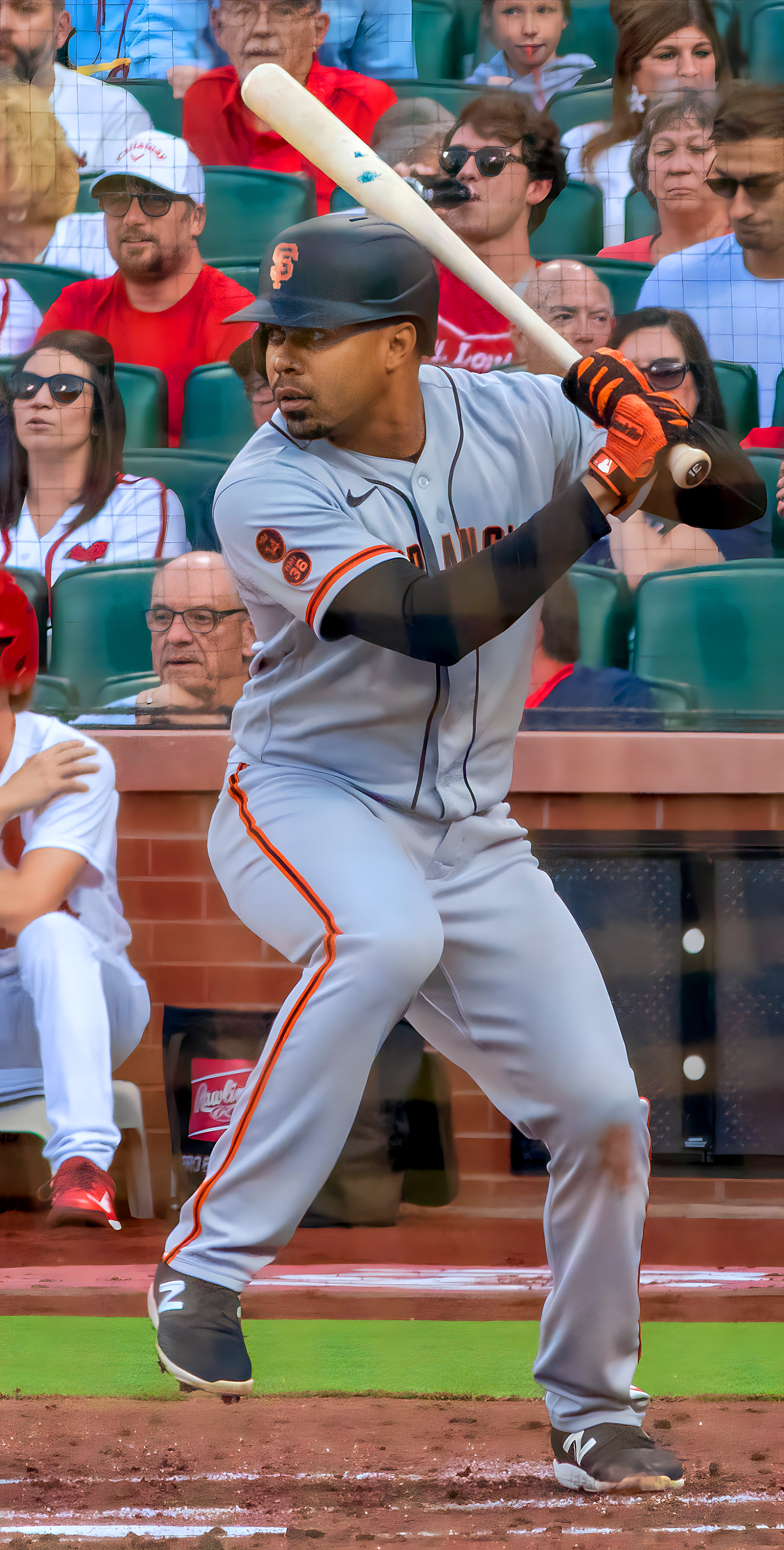
Wade in 2023

On February 4, 2021, the Twins traded Wade to the San Francisco Giants in exchange for pitcher Shaun Anderson.

In the 2021 regular season, Wade batted .253/.326/.482 with 18 home runs and 56 RBI in 336 at-bats, and had six steals in seven attempts. Batting in spots labeled "late and close", he hit .362/.444/.511. When hitting with 2 out and runners in scoring position, he produced at a rate of .407/.484/.889. In the 9th inning, he hit .565/.583/.826. He played 52 games in right field, 42 games in left field, 31 games at first base, and 2 games in center field. Players and fans dubbed Wade "Late Night LaMonte" and "Late Inning LaMonte" due to his late-game heroics during the regular season. He won the 2021 Willie Mac Award as the team's most inspirational player.

In 2022, other than 58 at-bats with the Triple–A Sacramento River Cats in which he batted .250, with the Giants he batted .207/.305/.359 in 217 at-bats, in which he had 29 runs, eight home runs, and 26 RBI. With the Giants he played 33 games in right field, 22 at first base, 19 in left field, 10 at DH, and one in center field.

On January 13, 2023, Wade agreed to a one-year, $1.375 million contract with the Giants, avoiding salary arbitration. On June 2, Wade recorded the 100th splash hit at Oracle Park, off of Dean Kremer of the Baltimore Orioles. He made 135 appearances for San Francisco during the regular season, hitting .256/.373/.417 with 17 home runs and 45 RBI.

Wade and the Giants agreed to a $3.5 million salary for the 2024 season. On May 28, 2024, Wade was ruled out for at least four weeks due to a strained hamstring. He played in 117 games for the Giants on the year, slashing .260/.380/.381 with eight home runs and 34 RBI.

Wade made 50 appearances for San Francisco in 2025, but struggled to a .167/.275/.271 batting line with one home run and 15 RBI. Wade was designated for assignment by the Giants on June 4, 2025.

=== Los Angeles Angels (2025) ===
On June 8, 2025, Wade was traded to the Los Angeles Angels in exchange for a player to be named later or cash considerations. In 30 appearances for Los Angeles, he produced .169/.260/.215 with one home run, three RBI, and one stolen base. Wade was released by the Angels on August 2.

According to Baseball Reference, Wade was tied with Michael Toglia for the fewest batting wins above replacement (WAR) in 2025, with -1.7.

=== Chicago White Sox (2026) ===
On January 22, 2026, Wade signed a minor league contract with the Chicago White Sox. He was released by the White Sox prior to the start of the regular season on March 20. On March 25, Wade re-signed with the White Sox on a new minor league contract. He made 46 appearances for the Triple-A Charlotte Knights, batting .250/.420/.441 with seven home runs, 26 RBI, and two stolen bases. Wade was released by the White Sox organization on June 1.

=== Houston Astros (2026–present) ===
On June 4, 2026, Wade signed a major league contract with the Houston Astros. On July 11, Wade hit his first career grand slam against Kumar Rocker of the Texas Rangers at Globe Life Field, He played 56 games for Houston, batting .205/.308/.346/.655, four home runs and 19 RBI.

== Personal life ==
Wade is from Owings Mills, Maryland. He has a brother, Jamal, who also played baseball for the Terrapins.
