= Andrés Torres (baseball) =

American baseball player (born 1978)

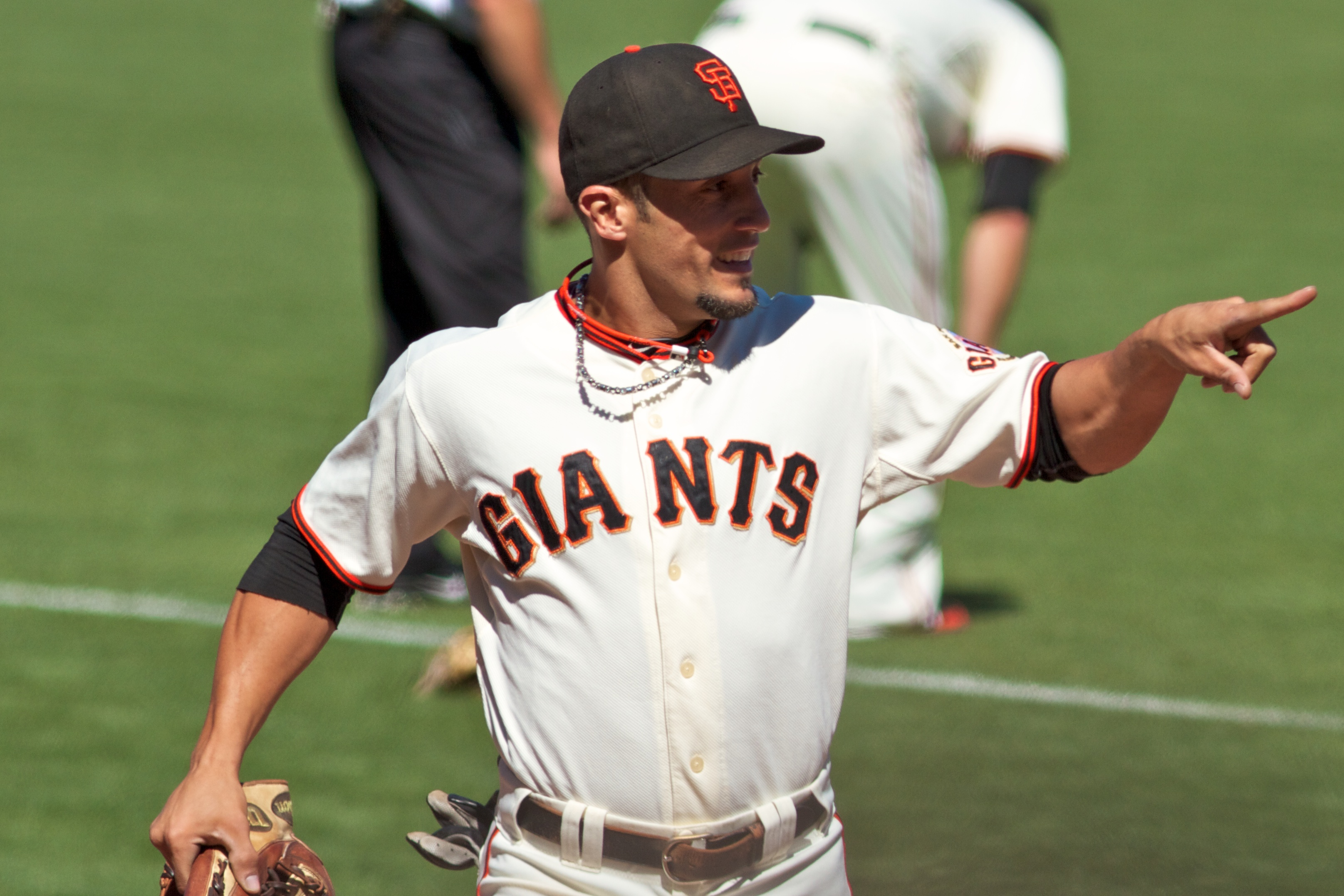
- Torres with the San Francisco Giants in 2010
- Center fielder
- Born: January 26, 1978 (age 48); Paterson, New Jersey, U.S.
- Batted: Switch Threw: Right

MLB debut
- April 7, 2002, for the Detroit Tigers

Last MLB appearance
- August 21, 2013, for the San Francisco Giants

MLB statistics
- Batting average: .242
- Home runs: 32
- Runs batted in: 174
- Stats at Baseball Reference

Teams
- Detroit Tigers (2002–2004); Texas Rangers (2005); San Francisco Giants (2009–2011); New York Mets (2012); San Francisco Giants (2013)

Career highlights and awards
- World Series champion (2010)

Andrés Yungo Torres Feliciano Jr. (born January 26, 1978) is an American former professional baseball center fielder who played as a switch hitter. He played in Major League Baseball (MLB) for the Detroit Tigers, Texas Rangers, New York Mets, and San Francisco Giants.

Born in New Jersey, Torres grew up in Puerto Rico before returning to the United States to attend Miami-Dade Community College. He was a track star at Miami-Dade and did not begin playing baseball until later. In 1998, he was drafted by the Detroit Tigers in the fourth round of the 1998 Major League Baseball draft. Torres played in their minor leagues until 2002, when he made his major league debut. In 2003, he got a chance to be the everyday center fielder for the Tigers, but after 23 games they chose to replace him. He played only three games for them in 2004 before he was outrighted to the minors and released upon request. In 2005, Torres resurfaced with the Texas Rangers but only appeared in eight games. He spent the next three years in the minor leagues.

Torres returned to the majors in 2009, as a reserve outfielder for the San Francisco Giants. In 2010, he became their everyday center fielder and leadoff hitter, winning the Willie Mac Award and helping the team win its first World Series since 1954. After the 2011 season (in which Torres battled injuries and lost playing time in September), he was traded to the New York Mets. He spent one season with the Mets, starting in center field for the most part except for a stretch in which he platooned with Kirk Nieuwenhuis, before re-signing with the Giants in 2013. He was used in a platoon split with Gregor Blanco in 2013 before suffering a season-ending Achilles injury in August. After going unsigned to begin 2014, Torres signed a minor league deal with the Boston Red Sox in June, but opted out of his contract in late July after not getting called up.

== Early life ==
Andrés Yungo Torres Feliciano Jr. was born on January 26, 1978, in Paterson, New Jersey. Torres moved with his family to Aguada, Puerto Rico when he was one year old. He played very little baseball as a child in Puerto Rico, and did not become serious about becoming a professional baseball player until he was 18. He attended Dr. Carlos Gonzalez High School.

== College career ==
Torres enrolled at Miami-Dade Community College. At Miami-Dade, he was a track and field star, running the 100 meters in 10.37 seconds.

== Professional career ==
=== Drafts and minor leagues ===
In 1997, the Florida Marlins drafted Torres in the 23rd round of the Major League Baseball draft, but he chose not to sign. He was then drafted by the Detroit Tigers in the fourth round of the 1998 Major League Baseball draft, and that time he signed.

Torres failed to bat higher than .236 his first two years in the minors, but he did steal several bases. However, in 2000, while playing for the Single-A advanced Lakeland Tigers of the Florida State League, Torres posted what was arguably the best minor league season in his career. With Lakeland, he batted .296 while leading the league with 65 stolen bases. During that season, he was promoted to the Double-A Jacksonville Suns of the Southern League for a short period of time; however, he struggled with Jacksonville, batting just .148. Detroit switched their Double-A affiliate to the Erie SeaWolves of the Eastern League in 2001; Torres spent the season with them but was limited to 64 games because of shoulder surgery. He batted .294 with 74 hits and 19 stolen bases.

Torres was considered Detroit's "leadoff hitter of the future" in 2002, according to Jason Beck of MLB.com. He began the season with the Triple-A Toledo Mud Hens of the International League.

=== 2002 ===
Torres was soon called up by the Detroit Tigers on April 7. He made his major league debut that same day and notched his first hit, a triple against CC Sabathia in a 5–1 loss to the Cleveland Indians. He batted .211 and was sent back to Toledo on April 26 after he had no hits in 12 at bats during a series against the Kansas City Royals. In 115 games for Toledo, Torres batted .266, tying Nick Punto for the league lead with 42 stolen bases, tying Omar Infante for fourth in the league in triples (eight), and finishing fourth in the league with 80 runs scored. The Tigers initially chose not to call up Torres in September when rosters expanded; he did not rejoin them until September 20 following injuries to Bobby Higginson and Hiram Bocachica. In 19 games (70 at bats) with the Tigers, Torres batted .200 with 14 hits, three runs batted in (RBI), and two stolen bases.

==== 2003 ====
The next season, Torres failed to make the Tigers out of spring training, but he split the season between Detroit and Toledo. He was called up on April 29 to play centerfield and bat leadoff for the Tigers. After he batted .224 in 23 games, the Tigers traded for Alex Sánchez on May 27 to replace Torres in centerfield and sent Torres to Toledo to make room for Sánchez. He was recalled on June 18 to be a reserve outfielder when Ernie Young was designated for assignment. On this stint, Torres tried to improve his hitting by batting exclusively right-handed, saying, "I feel better from the right side." He batted .208 in 23 games on this stint before being sent back to Toledo on August 2 to make room for A. J. Hinch to return from the disabled list. Torres was recalled one final time, in September. On September 14, Torres hit his first home run, a solo shot off of Jimmy Gobble of the Royals in a 7–2 loss. In 59 games (168 at bats) with the Tigers, he batted .220 with 37 hits, one home run, and five stolen bases. Despite playing only 70 games in Toledo, Torres finished fifth in the International League with 27 stolen bases.

==== 2004 ====
Torres was initially sent to the minors to begin 2004 but was recalled on April 7 without playing a game for Toledo when Dmitri Young broke his leg. He only appeared in three games (and didn't even have a plate appearance) before the Tigers attempted to outright him to the minors. Instead of going to the minors, Torres requested his release. He was granted free agency on April 22.

=== Chicago White Sox ===
Just four days after getting released by the Tigers, Torres signed with the Chicago White Sox. He spent the rest of the 2004 season with the International League Charlotte Knights (outside a six-game rehab stint), batting .295 with 95 hits in 87 games and tying with Jason Tyner for eighth in the league in stolen bases, with 23. After the season, he filed for free agency.

=== Texas Rangers (2005) ===
On November 16, 2004, Torres was signed by the Texas Rangers. He started 2005 with the Triple-A Oklahoma RedHawks of the Pacific Coast League, but he only played in 15 games (due to a sprained right shoulder) before getting called up by the Rangers on May 15 when Gary Matthews Jr., went on the disabled list. However, the Rangers designated him for assignment on June 12 and outrighted him to Oklahoma City on June 17 after he batted .158 in eight games with them. Torres suffered a right abdominal strain a week later which ended his season.

=== Minnesota Twins ===
Torres signed with the Minnesota Twins on December 25, 2005. He spent the entire 2006 season with the Triple-A Rochester Red Wings of the International League, batting .236 with them in 116 games and tying for second in the league with nine triples (tied with Joe Thurston behind Wayne Lindon's 12). He became a free agent after the season.

=== Detroit Tigers ===
Unsigned through February in 2007, Torres called the Detroit Tigers and asked for a job. The Tigers signed him on March 2 and assigned him assigned to Erie, where he was named the Eastern League Player of the Week for April 30 through May 6 after he batted .550. He batted .292 with 17 stolen bases in 85 games before being promoted to Toledo. His 11 triples led the Eastern League despite the fact that he only appeared in 85 games. At Toledo, Torres also batted .292 in 42 games. He was caught stealing bases (six) more times than he stole successfully (five), but in only 42 games, he managed to tie for second in the league with nine triples (tied again with Thurston behind Brian Bixler's 10). Following the year, he again filed for free agency.

=== Chicago Cubs ===
On November 20, 2007, Torres signed with the Chicago Cubs. In 2008, he engaged a private hitting instructor named Chris O'Leary to help him out. He began trying to model his swing after Albert Pujols, instead of merely trying to put the ball on the ground and run to first base, which is what he had been doing. He spent the entire season with the Iowa Cubs of the Pacific Coast League, batting .306 in 118 games with 11 home runs. He finished fifth in the league with 91 runs scored, tied for second in the league with 10 triples (tied with Trent Oeltjen and Nate Schierholtz behind Tim Raines Jr.'s 13), and led the league with 29 stolen bases. However, the Cubs did not re-sign him and he once again filed for free agency following the season.

=== San Francisco Giants (2009–2011) ===
==== 2009 ====
Torres signed with the San Francisco Giants on January 9, 2009. After a strong spring training, he was named to the Giants' Opening Day roster as a reserve outfielder. Except for a minor league rehab assignment, he spent the entire year in the majors. He was placed on the disabled list on April 27 with a strained left hamstring. After a rehab assignment, he was activated on May 26. On June, 15 he hit the 48th "Splash Hit" home run at AT&T Park, against John Lackey in a 9–7 loss to the Los Angeles Angels of Anaheim. He was again placed on the disabled list on July 31 with the same injury he suffered earlier in the year; he was out until September 1. On September 20, he hit two home runs against Randy Wolf in a 6–2 loss to the Los Angeles Dodgers. He finished the year with a career high .270 batting average and tied for eighth (along with Craig Counsell, Gerardo Parra, Everth Cabrera, and Juan Pierre) in the National League (NL) with eight triples despite only playing 75 games.

==== 2010: World Series Champion ====
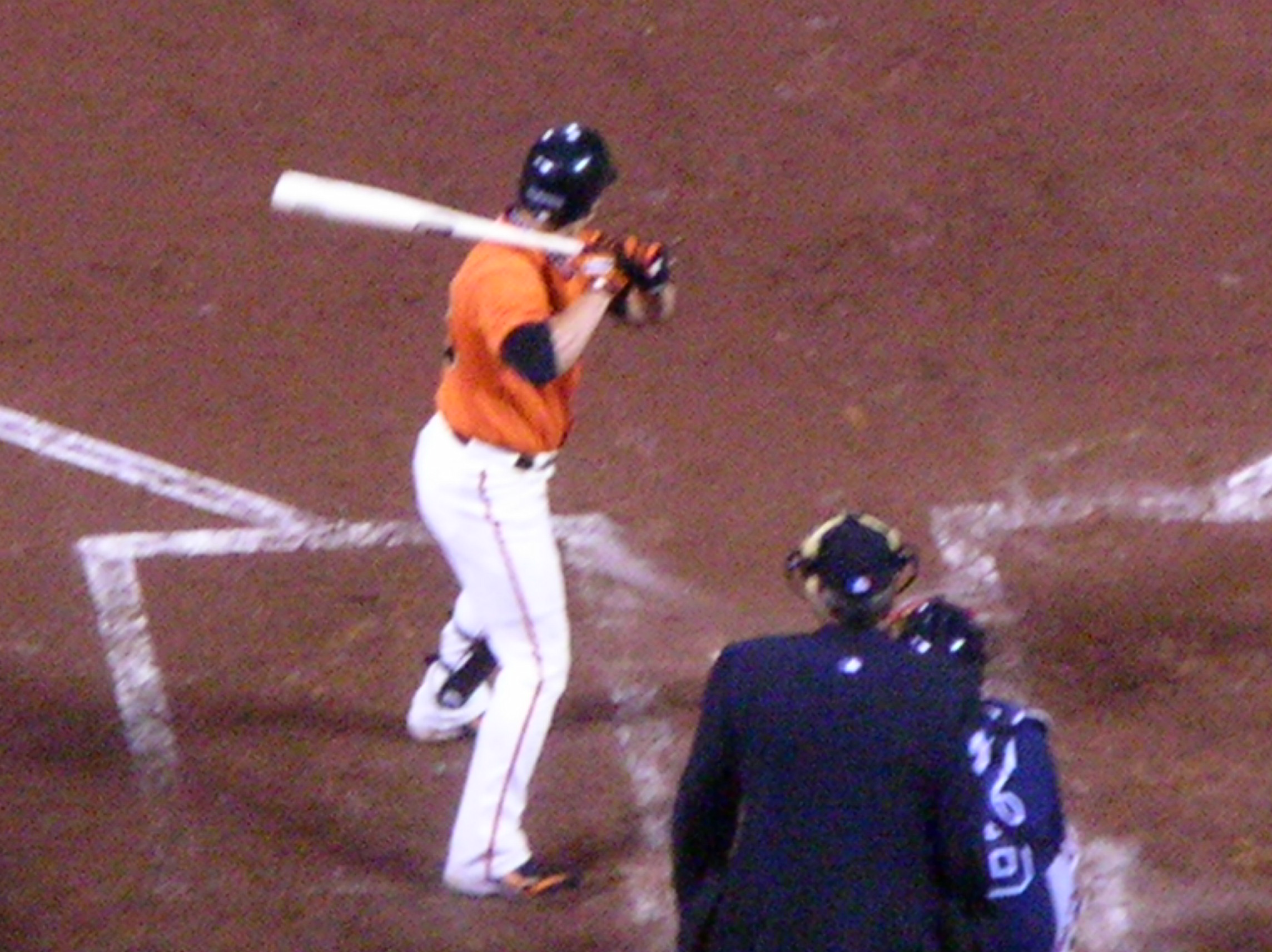
Torres waits to hit in Game 2 of the 2010 National League Division Series

In 2010, Torres began the season as a backup outfielder again. On April 25, he replaced Eugenio Vélez (who had been filling in for the injured Aaron Rowand) as the Giants' center fielder, playing six games until Rowand's return on May 1. Upon Rowand's return, Torres returned to a reserve role until May 9, when he became a starting outfielder for the rest of the season after Mark DeRosa hurt his wrist. On May 30, he had a game-ending RBI single in the 10th inning against Carlos Rosa to give the Giants a 6–5 victory over the Arizona Diamondbacks. By midseason, he had replaced Rowand as the Giants' everyday center fielder and leadoff hitter. After the Giants blew a 9–2 lead over the Florida Marlins on July 28, Torres had a game-ending single in the 10th inning against Clay Hensley to give the Giants a 10–9 win. After the Giants blew a 7–3 lead on August 12, Torres had a game-ending RBI single against Andrew Cashner in the ninth inning to give the Giants an 8–7 victory over the Chicago Cubs. On the morning of September 12, Torres woke up with severe stomach pain and was diagnosed with appendicitis. He underwent an appendectomy the same day. He returned to the lineup roughly two weeks later, and on October 1 it was announced that he had won the 2010 Willie Mac Award. Torres said upon receiving the award, "It's the best. It's an honor for me from my teammates. I've been blessed and I'm happy and just thank God for everything, putting me here and these guys treating me like a family." In 139 games (507 at bats), Torres hit .268 with 84 runs scored, 136 hits, 16 home runs, and 63 RBI. He ranked fourth in the NL in doubles (43, behind Jayson Werth's 46 and Matt Holliday's and Ryan Braun's 45) and ranked seventh in the NL in triples (eight). He finished the year having led the Giants in stolen bases with 26.

Torres batted .115 in his first seven playoff games before batting .406 over the last eight. In the first four games of the 2010 World Series against the Texas Rangers, he had extra-base hits, tying a Giants' playoff record for most consecutive games with an extra-base hit. He had a home run off Colby Lewis in Game 3 of the World Series; however, the Giants lost that game 4–2. In Game 4, he doubled twice, driving in a run and scoring another as the Giants won 4–0. Torres also had two stolen bases but was caught twice in the postseason. He won his first World Series ring as the Giants defeated the Rangers in five games to win their first World Series since 1954.

==== 2011 ====
After injuring his left Achilles tendon on April 9, Torres spent time on the disabled list from April 15 to May 10. On May 30, Torres hit his first career grand slam against Kyle McClellan in a 7–3 victory over the St. Louis Cardinals. Three days later, he scored three runs in a 12–7 victory over St. Louis. On July 15, Torres had three hits, scored three runs, drove in two runs, stole a base, and slammed into the wall while making a nice catch to rob Kyle Phillips of a two-RBI double in a 6–1 victory over the San Diego Padres. He went on the disabled list a second time, from August 13 through August 28, with a bruised right leg. After Torres batted just .228 through the beginning of September, he lost quite a bit of playing time to Cody Ross and Justin Christian for the remainder of the year. In 112 games (348 at bats), Torres hit .221 with 77 hits, 24 doubles, four home runs, and 19 RBI. He led the Giants in stolen bases once again, with 19.

=== New York Mets (2012) ===
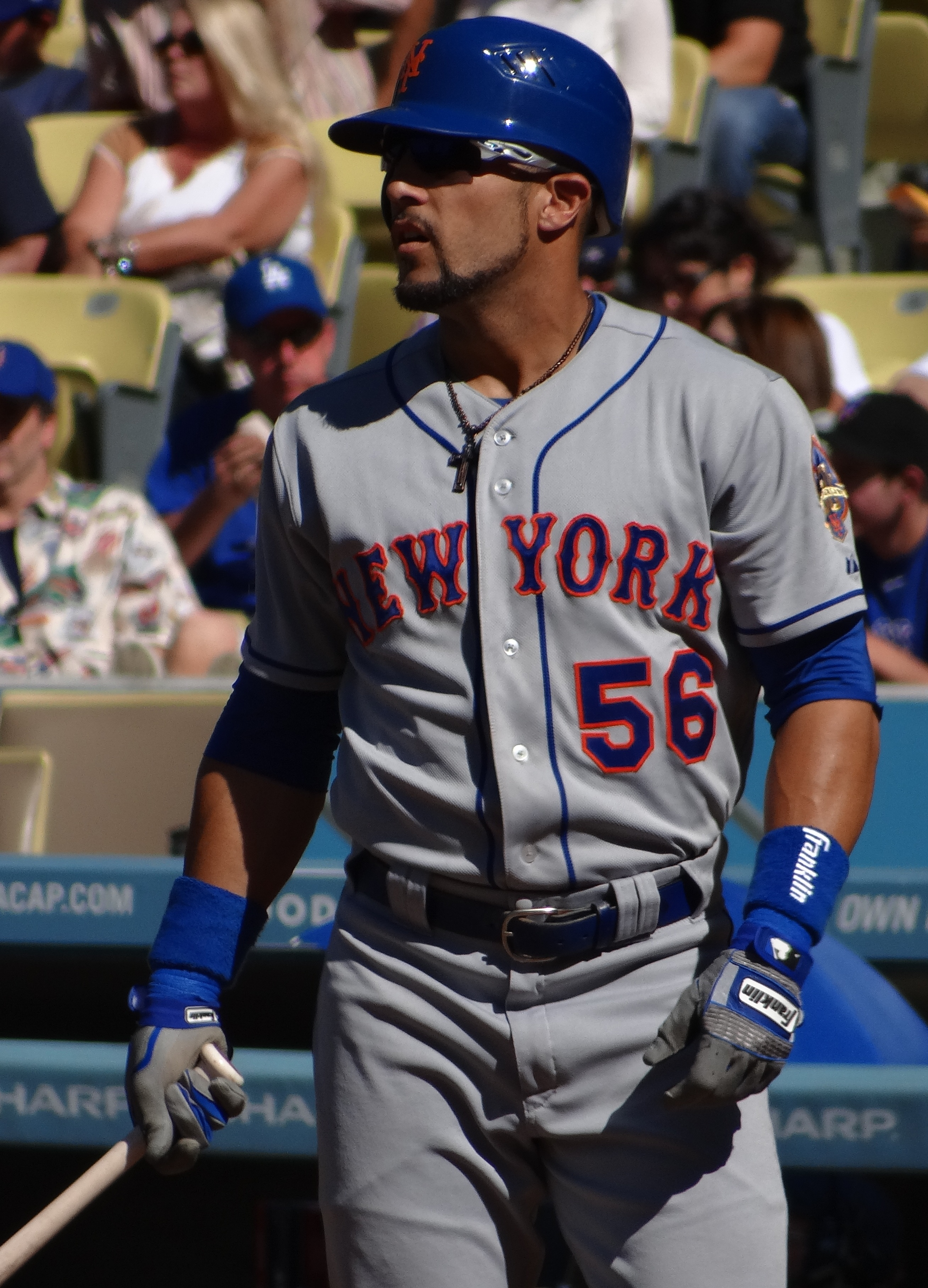
Andrés Torres batting at Dodger Stadium

On December 7, 2011, the Giants traded Torres and Ramón Ramírez to the New York Mets for Ángel Pagán. The Mets and Torres settled their case of arbitration on January 17, 2012, with Torres earning $2.7 million for the 2012 season.

On Opening Day (April 5) 2012, Torres re-injured his left calf—which he had previously hurt during 2012 spring training—and spent much of April on the disabled list. He was activated on April 30. However, though he would receive most of the starts in center field, he began to platoon with Kirk Nieuwenhuis, who had filled in for him when he was on the disabled list. This continued until July 29, when Nieuwenhuis was returned to the minor leagues, enabling Torres to be the full-time starter for the rest of the season. Torres endured a career-worst 0 for 18 streak that he finally snapped with a hit against Rafael Betancourt on August 20 in a 3–1 loss to the Colorado Rockies. In 132 games (374 at bats), he hit .230 with 86 hits, 17 doubles, seven triples, three home runs, 35 RBI, and 13 stolen bases (in 18 attempts). As a right-handed hitter, he batted .286. He joined José Reyes as the only players in Mets' history to have two games in a season with a triple and home run. Following the season, he filed for free agency.

=== Second stint with San Francisco Giants (2013) ===
On December 13, 2012, Torres agreed to a one-year non-conditional contract to return to the San Francisco Giants. He began 2013 platooning with Gregor Blanco in left field. On May 8, he had a game-winning RBI single against Antonio Bastardo in the 10th inning of a 4–3 victory over the Philadelphia Phillies. From May 20 through June 30, he batted .298 with 11 doubles and 14 RBI in 35 games. He had a game-tying RBI double against Rex Brothers on May 25 in an eventual 10-inning, 6–5 win over Colorado. On July 13, he began platooning with Blanco in center field after Jeff Francoeur was called up. His season came to an end on August 1, when he was placed on the disabled list with a left Achilles strain, an injury which he acknowledged prevented him from hitting for power in 2013. In 103 games (272 at bats), Torres hit .250 with 68 hits, two home runs, and 21 RBI while only managing four stolen bases. He fared better from the right side at the plate, batting .291 as opposed to batting .206 left-handed. After the season, Torres filed for free agency.

=== Boston Red Sox ===
On June 11, 2014, Torres signed a minor-league deal with the Boston Red Sox. He played five games with the Lowell Spinners of the Single-A (short season) New York–Penn League and 18 games with the Pawtucket Red Sox of the International League. He batted .292 with Pawtucket. On July 28, Torres opted out of his contract with the Red Sox by exercising an opt–out clause in his contract.

== Personal life ==
Torres was married to Soannie Mendoza. She died on December 8, 2016, from NUT midline carcinoma related causes. The couple has a son, Diego, born in 2004, and a daughter, Mia, born in 2012.

In 2002, Torres was diagnosed with attention deficit hyperactivity disorder (ADHD); however, he did not begin taking medication to treat it until 2007. His medication has been helpful to him, and he is currently a spokesperson for ADHD. In 2012, Plan A Films produced a feature-length documentary about Torres titled Gigante, discussing his ADHD. The film was directed by Chusy Haney-Jardine. Though a screening for the movie was shown at the NYU Langone Medical Center on May 31, 2012, the movie was never released.

== See also ==
- List of Major League Baseball players from Puerto Rico
