= Brandon Crawford =

American baseball player (born 1987)

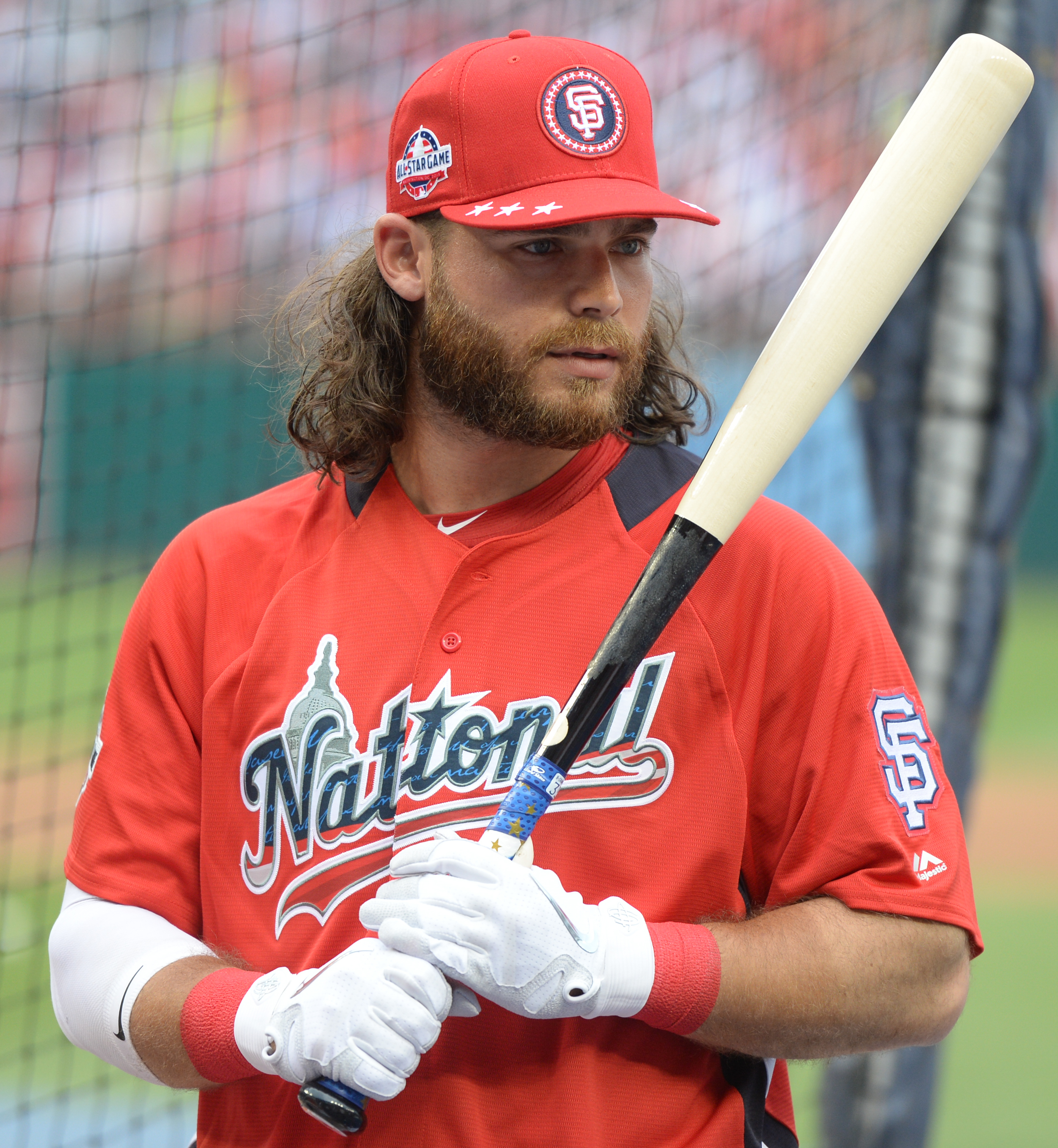
- Crawford at the 2018 MLB All-Star Game
- Shortstop
- Born: January 21, 1987 (age 39); Mountain View, California, U.S.
- Batted: Left Threw: Right

MLB debut
- May 27, 2011, for the San Francisco Giants

Last MLB appearance
- August 10, 2024, for the St. Louis Cardinals

MLB statistics
- Batting average: .249
- Home runs: 147
- Runs batted in: 748
- Stats at Baseball Reference

Teams
- San Francisco Giants (2011–2023); St. Louis Cardinals (2024)

Career highlights and awards
- 3× All-Star (2015, 2018, 2021); 2× World Series champion (2012, 2014); 4× Gold Glove Award (2015–2017, 2021); Silver Slugger Award (2015); San Francisco Giants Wall of Fame
Medals
Men's baseball
Representing United States
World Baseball Classic
Gold medal – first place	2017 Los Angeles	Team
FISU World Championship
Gold medal – first place	2006 Havana	Team

Brandon Michael Crawford (born January 21, 1987) is an American former professional baseball shortstop. He spent 14 seasons in Major League Baseball (MLB), playing all but his last season for the San Francisco Giants. Crawford played college baseball for the University of California, Los Angeles (UCLA). He was selected in the fourth round of the 2008 MLB draft by the Giants, and played his final season in 2024 with the St. Louis Cardinals. Internationally, Crawford represents the United States. In the 2017 World Baseball Classic (WBC), he helped win Team USA's first gold medal in a WBC tournament.

He made his MLB debut in 2011. He was the sixth player in MLB history to hit a grand slam in his first MLB game, and the first shortstop to hit a grand slam in an MLB postseason game. He is a three-time All-Star (2015, 2018, and 2021), four-time Gold Glove Award winner (2015–2017, and 2021), two-time Wilson Defensive Player of the Year Award winner (2012 and 2016), and won the Silver Slugger Award at shortstop in 2015. Crawford has played the most games at shortstop for the Giants in franchise history, and at the end of the 2022 season was 2nd of all active players in games played at shortstop.

After 13 seasons with the Giants, Crawford signed with the St. Louis Cardinals in 2024, where he spent one season before announcing his retirement on November 27, 2024.

== Early life ==
Brandon Michael Crawford was born on January 21, 1987, in Mountain View, California. His family lived in Menlo Park before they moved to Pleasanton when he was in elementary school. He grew up a San Francisco Giants fan, and his family purchased season tickets and a commemorative brick in Willie Mays Plaza outside AT&T Park when the ballpark opened in 2000.

Crawford attended Foothill High School in Pleasanton, where he was a three-sport athlete: football, basketball, and baseball. He was the starting quarterback for the Foothill Falcons and graduated in the class of 2005.

== College career ==
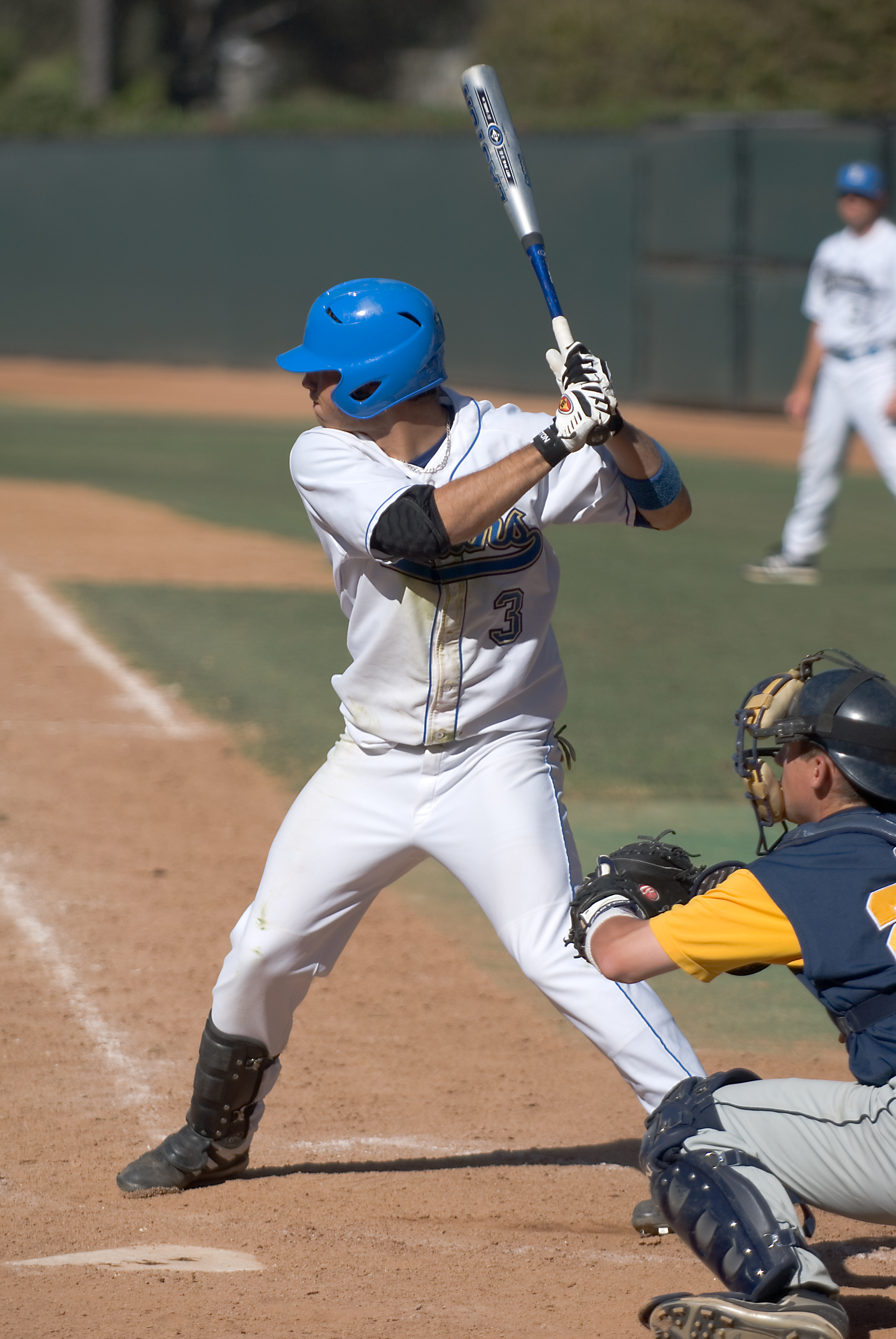
Crawford at UCLA in 2007

Crawford attended the University of California, Los Angeles (UCLA), where he was a physiological sciences major. He played summer ball in the Northwoods League for the Mankato MoonDogs in 2005 before he attended UCLA. He played baseball for the UCLA Bruins from 2006 to 2008 and helped lead the team to the NCAA Regionals in three consecutive seasons, the first time in school history. Crawford was named the team's MVP in 2006 and 2007, and was named to the All-Pac-10 Conference team in 2007. In the summer of 2007, he played for the Orleans Cardinals of the Cape Cod Baseball League.

He helped lead the United States national team to the title in the 2006 International University Sports Federation (FISU) World Championship.

== Professional career ==
=== Draft and minor leagues ===
The San Francisco Giants selected Crawford in the fourth round, with the 117th overall selection, of the 2008 MLB draft, and he signed for a $375,000 signing bonus. Crawford started his first full season as a professional with the High–A San Jose Giants in 2009. In 25 games, he hit .371 with six home runs and 17 RBI, good enough for a slugging percentage of .600 and 1.045 OPS. In May, Crawford was promoted to the Double-A Connecticut Defenders, where he spent the rest of the season, batting .258/.294/.365 with four home runs in 108 games.

In 2010, Crawford opened the season in Double–A (now with the Richmond Flying Squirrels) and earned an Eastern League mid-season All-Star nod, batting .241/.337/.375 in 79 games before suffering a broken hand in early July, which sidelined Crawford for nearly two months. When he recovered, he was assigned back to San Jose for the remainder of the season. He was ranked the sixth-best prospect in the Giants' organization by Baseball America heading into 2011.

In 2011, Crawford was invited to spring training but was set back by a broken finger suffered in the final week, and started the season in San Jose while he recovered. There he batted .322/.412/.593 in 59 at-bats. With the Triple–A Fresno Grizzlies, Crawford batted .234/.291/.327 in 107 at-bats. In the AFL, he was named to the AFL All-Prospect Team.

=== San Francisco Giants (2011–2023) ===
==== 2011 ====
The Giants promoted Crawford to the major leagues for the first time on May 26, 2011, following injuries to Buster Posey, Mike Fontenot, and Darren Ford. Crawford made his MLB debut on May 27 against the Milwaukee Brewers. His first MLB hit came in his third at bat of the game, and was a grand slam off the Brewers' Shaun Marcum. He joined Bobby Bonds and Brian Dallimore as the only Giants whose first career MLB hit was a grand slam; he also became the sixth player in MLB history and the second player in Giants history along with Bobby Bonds to hit a grand slam in his first game.

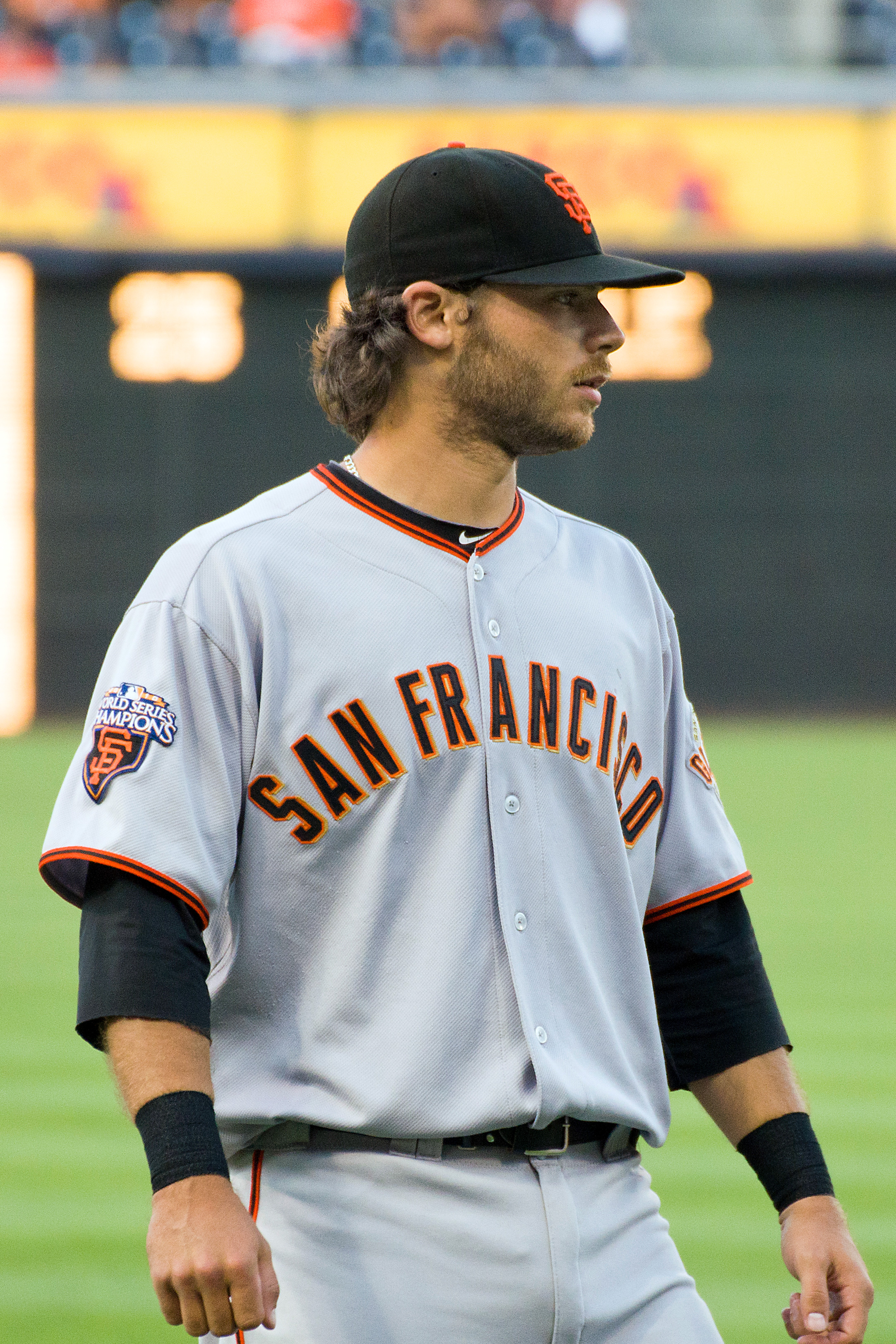
Crawford in 2011

On July 31, the Giants optioned Crawford to their Triple-A affiliate, the Fresno Grizzlies, after the Giants acquired shortstop Orlando Cabrera. The Giants were 23–18 with Crawford as a starter, but he was hitting only .190. Crawford was recalled in September when MLB rosters expanded to 40 players.

==== 2012 ====
In 2012, Crawford was named the team's opening day shortstop, in which he batted 8th in the lineup. He batted .248 with four home runs, 26 doubles, and 45 RBI in 143 games. On July 20, Crawford hit his second career grand slam and drove in 5 runs as the Giants defeated the Philadelphia Phillies 7–2. Crawford was praised for his defense during the 2012 postseason, which culminated in a 4–0 sweep of the Detroit Tigers in the 2012 World Series. Crawford ranked third among NL shortstops in Defensive Runs Saved at +12, and was recognized with the Wilson Defensive Player of the Year Award at shortstop.

==== 2013 ====
Crawford was the Giants' starting shortstop for 2013, with Joaquín Árias as his backup. In 149 games on the year, he hit .248/.311/.363 with nine home runs and 43 RBI.

==== 2014 ====
In 153 games, Crawford batted .246 and set career highs with ten home runs and 69 RBIs. On April 13, Crawford hit a tenth inning, walk-off home run against Rex Brothers of the Colorado Rockies. In the 2014 postseason, Crawford led all Giants with 9 RBIs. In the fourth inning of the NL Wild Card Game between the Giants and Pittsburgh Pirates, Crawford hit a grand slam off of Edinson Vólquez, becoming the first shortstop to hit a grand slam in Major League Baseball postseason history. Crawford batted .304 (7-for-23) with 4 RBIs in the 2014 World Series, en route to his second championship with the Giants. In Game 7, Crawford drove in the second run for the Giants with a sacrifice fly and, along with second baseman Joe Panik, turned a critical double-play in the third inning.

==== 2015 ====
On January 27, 2015, the Giants and Crawford avoided arbitration by agreeing to a one-year, $3.175 million deal. On May 16, Crawford hit his third career grand slam (fourth including the postseason) and drove in a career-high six runs against Mike Leake of the Cincinnati Reds. In May, Crawford led the team in RBIs, and on July 1, Crawford set a new career-high with his 11th home run of the season. On July 6, Crawford was voted by his fellow Major League players as a reserve for the 2015 MLB All-Star Game. On August 14 at AT&T Park, in an 8–5 win over the Washington Nationals, Crawford hit his 100th career double. On September 24 at Petco Park, Crawford hit his twentieth home run of the season off of Ian Kennedy, making him the fourth Giants shortstop in franchise history to reach the milestone, after Rich Aurilia, Alvin Dark, and Travis Jackson.

Crawford set career highs in several offensive categories, batting .256 with 21 home runs, 84 RBIs, 33 doubles, and 130 hits. Crawford was the first Giants' shortstop to lead the team in home runs since Bill Dahlen in 1905. He won his first Rawlings Gold Glove Award and Silver Slugger Award, the first Giant to win both awards in the same year since Barry Bonds in 1997.

==== 2016 ====
After the 2015 season, Crawford and the Giants agreed to a six-year, $75 million contract through the 2021 season. The deal covered Crawford's final two years of salary arbitration and first four years of free agency. The contract includes a no-trade clause, meaning that Crawford has to give consent if he were to be traded.

On April 8, 2016, Crawford hit a walk-off home run off Joe Blanton of the Los Angeles Dodgers in the tenth inning of a game in which the Giants had been no-hit through 7 1/3 innings and recorded only two hits. On August 8 at Marlins Park, in an 8–7 win over the Miami Marlins that went into extra-innings, Crawford hit a career-high in base hits and singles with seven and five respectively. His seven hits tied the NL record for most total hits in a single game, and was the first time this feat had been done since Rennie Stennett in 1975. The seven hits were also a Giants all-time franchise record. Two days later, Crawford met with Stennett at Marlins Park.

For the 2016 season, Crawford increased his batting average to a career-best .275 in 155 games played. Along with teammate Javier López, Crawford won the Willie Mac Award, which honors the Giants' most inspirational player. He was awarded his second consecutive Gold Glove Award after the season.

==== 2017 ====
On April 29, 2017, Crawford was placed on the 10-day disabled list due to a right groin strain. In 2017, he batted .253/.305/.403 with 14 home runs and 77 RBI, and after the season he was awarded his third consecutive Gold Glove Award. He was the first shortstop to win three straight since Jimmy Rollins (2007–09), and the first Giant since J. T. Snow who won four in a row (1997–2000).

==== 2018 ====
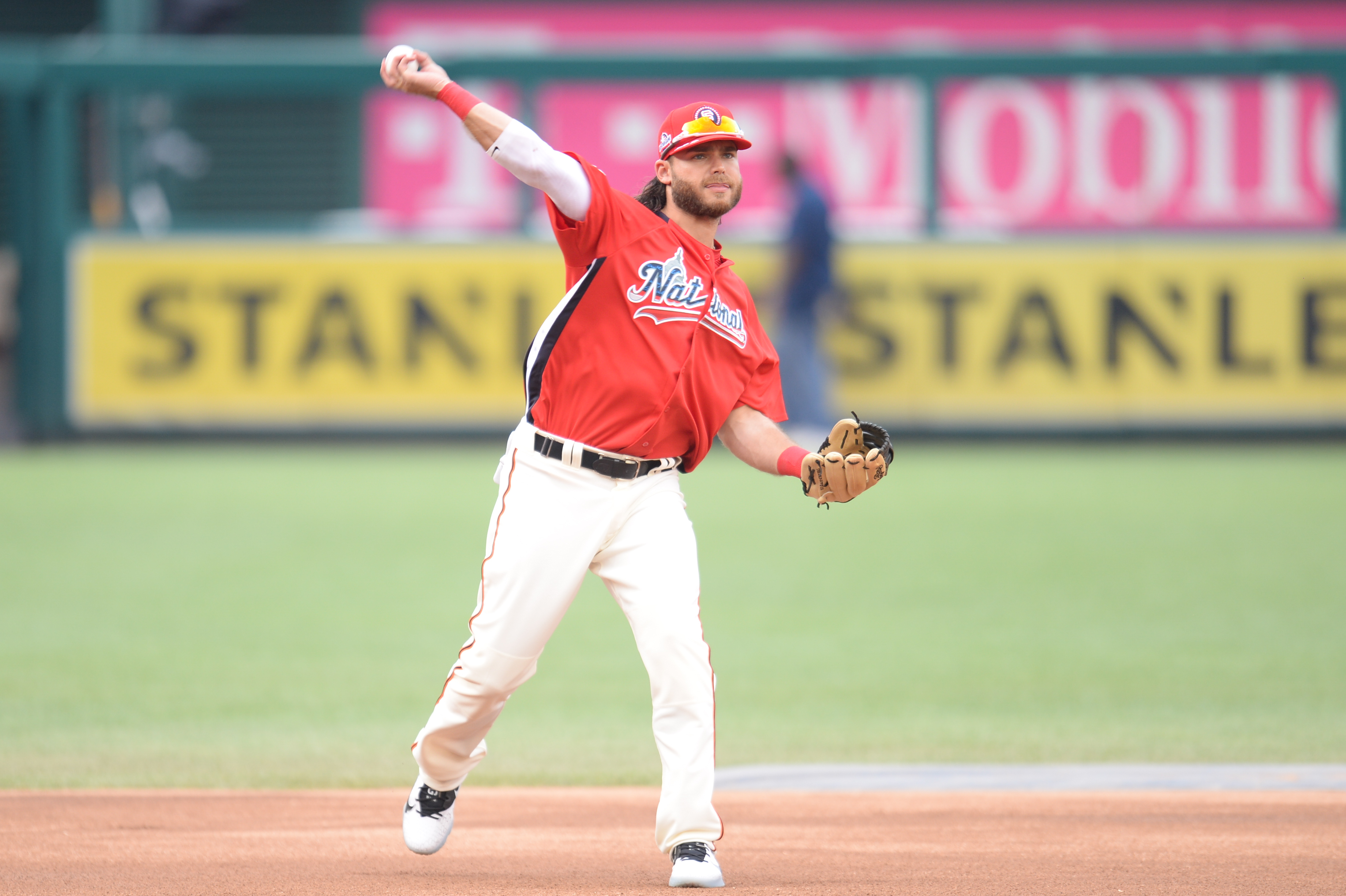
Crawford as a 2018 NL All Star

On June 27, 2018, Crawford hit a walk-off home run against the Colorado Rockies to win the game 1–0 for the Giants. Crawford became the first Giants player since Steve Decker in April 1991 to hit a walk-off solo homer to win a 1–0 game. Batting .300 with ten home runs and 39 RBIs, Crawford was named the starting shortstop for the 2018 MLB All-Star Game. Crawford hit .193 in the second half, battling injuries throughout the second half. A left-handed hitter, Crawford had a higher batting average against left-hand pitching than right-hand pitching at .274. His average against right-hand pitching was .243.

For the season, he hit a .254/.325/.394 batting line. He had the slowest baserunning sprint speed of all major league shortstops, at 25.9 feet/second.

In 2018, Crawford was the Giants team winner of the Heart & Hustle Award. Crawford lost out on his fourth straight gold glove to Arizona Diamondbacks shortstop Nick Ahmed.

==== 2019 ====
Against the Rockies on July 15, 2019, he had five hits in six at bats including two home runs and a career-high eight runs batted in during the Giants' 19-2 victory. The eight RBIs tied the San Francisco team record held by Willie Mays and Orlando Cepeda. Crawford became the first shortstop in history to record five hits and eight RBIs in one game, and the first Giant to have at least two home runs and eight RBIs in a game since Willie Mays did it in 1961.

In 2019, he batted .228/.304/.350 with 11 home runs and 59 RBIs.

==== 2020 ====
In 2020 he batted .256/.326/.465 (the highest slugging percentage of his career) with eight home runs and 23 RBIs. He had the slowest sprint speed of all major league shortstops, at 25.7 feet per second.

==== 2021 ====
On June 8, 2021, Crawford started in what was his 1,326th game playing shortstop for the Giants, passing Travis Jackson for the most games played at the position in franchise history. On August 13, Crawford agreed to a 2-year extension worth $32 million through 2023.

In the 2021 regular season, Crawford batted .298(9th in the NL)/.373(10th)/.522 with 79 runs, 24 home runs, 11 stolen bases, and 90 RBIs (all career highs). In 138 games he had 549 at-bats. On defense, he had a .983 fielding percentage (third in the NL), and a 3.76 range factor/game (3rd). At the end of the season, he was third of all active players in games played at shortstop, at 1,409.

In Game 3 of the 2021 NLDS, Crawford made a leaping catch to preserve a crucial 1–0 lead for the Giants, which held to give the Giants a 2–1 series lead.

He won the 2021 National League Gold Glove Award at shortstop. With four Gold Glove Awards he became tied with former first baseman J.T. Snow for third-most in Giants history.

He was named a 2021 Silver Slugger Award finalist. He placed fourth in National League MVP voting.

==== 2022 ====
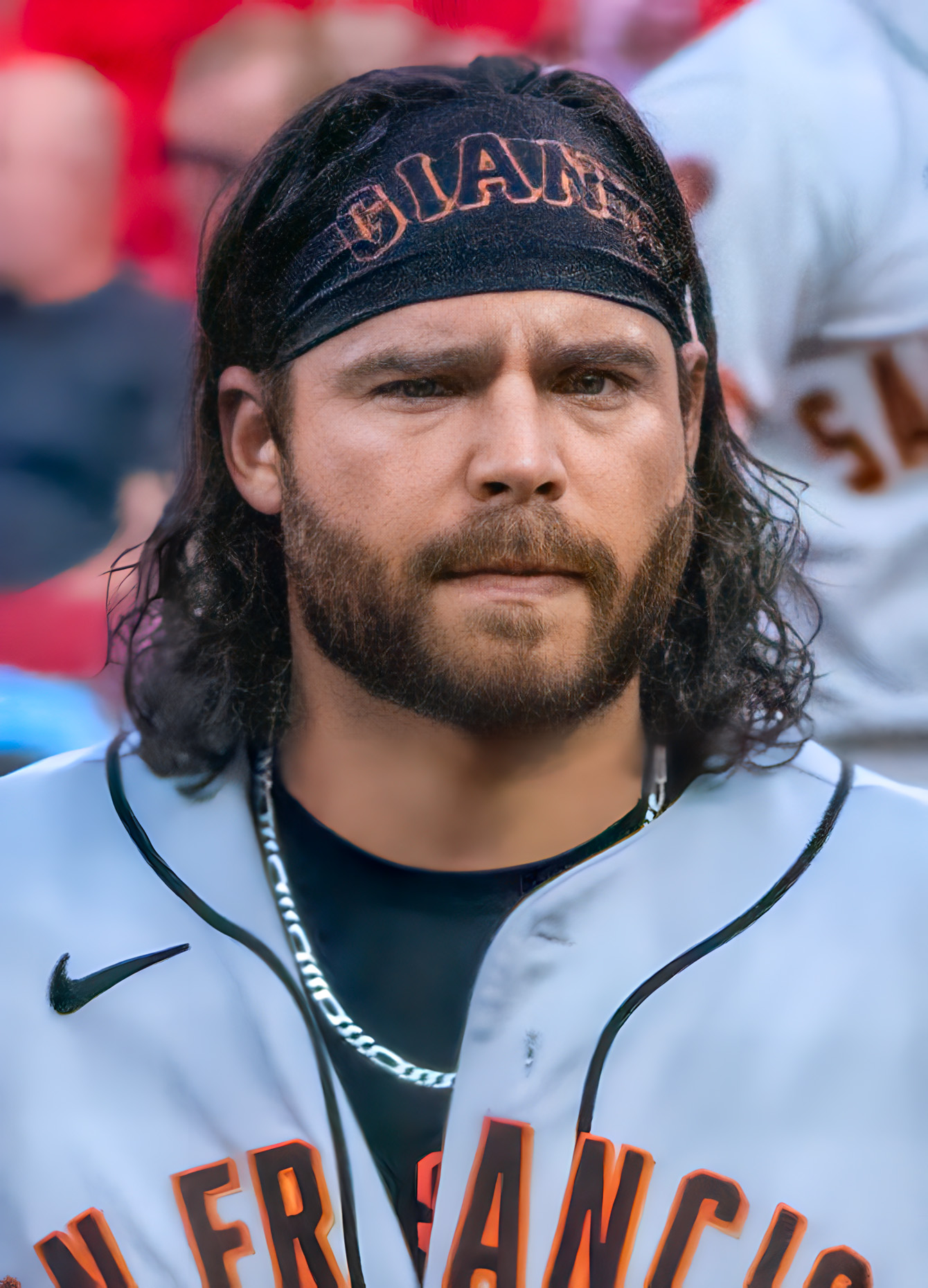
Crawford with the Giants 2023

In 2022 with the Giants he batted .231/.308/.344 in 407 at bats, with nine home runs and 52 RBIs, as on defense he led the NL in range factor per game at shortstop (3.88). He was second of all active players in career games at shortstop (1,525).

==== 2023 ====
Following the offseason departure of fellow infielder Brandon Belt, Crawford became the longest tenured member of the Giants. He made his first major-league appearance as a pitcher with a scoreless ninth inning of relief in a 13–3 victory over the Chicago Cubs on June 11. In 2021, Crawford had mentioned his desire to eventually pitch in a big league game, although at the time manager Gabe Kapler declined to allow it, citing Crawford’s extreme value at shortstop. During the appearance, Crawford’s fastball reached 89.7 mph, a speed he matched in a bullpen session earlier in the season. On July 7, he hit a two-run home run off Austin Gomber of the Colorado Rockies, moving him into 6th place on the Giants’ San Francisco-era RBI leaderboard. Crawford’s 2023 season included multiple trips to the 10-day injured list. His season finished with him setting career lows in batting average and on-base percentage, with a slash line of 0.194/0.273/0.314.

Nearing the end of the season, speculation began to grow about Crawford’s future, not just within the organization but with regards to a potential retirement as well. In the latter half of a season in which he set offensive career lows, Crawford remained mute about his future within the sport. On October 1, 2023, Crawford played in what many speculated could be his final game for the Giants, a 5-2 loss against the Los Angeles Dodgers. Prior to the game, Crawford’s four children threw the ceremonial first pitches. Throughout the game, Crawford received standing ovations from fans, and was removed from the game by manager Kai Correa in the 9th inning, allowing him to walk off the field to one final standing ovation from the Giants fans. He went 0–4 that game.

After the season drew to a close, Crawford expressed his desire to remain with the Giants in any capacity, including significantly reduced playing time. In response to the Cardinals offering Crawford a 1-year $2 million dollar contract, his agent Joel Wolfe reached out to the Giants to explore the possibility of Crawford returning to the team. However, President of Baseball Operations Farhan Zaidi declined to guarantee him a roster spot, citing the difficulty in maintaining a club legend as a backup, instead inviting him to training camp as a non-roster invitee. Crawford referred to this as the “nail in the coffin” that led him to pursue other opportunities in the league.

Crawford finished his Giants career with the 7th most games played, 16th most hits, 8th most doubles, 17th most home runs and 12th most RBI in team history.

=== St. Louis Cardinals (2024) ===
On February 27, 2024, Crawford signed a one-year, $2 million contract with the St. Louis Cardinals. In 28 games for St. Louis, he slashed .169/.263/.282 with one home run and four RBI. Crawford was released by the Cardinals on August 20.

On November 27, 2024, Crawford announced his retirement from professional baseball.

== International career ==
Crawford represented Team USA at the 2017 World Baseball Classic. He appeared in eight games during the tournament, posting a .385 batting average and a 1.006 OPS. Team USA would defeat Puerto Rico in the championship game, securing their first-ever World Baseball Classic title.

== Accomplishments and honors ==
Championships
Title	Times	Dates
National League champion	2	2012, 2014
World Series champion	2	2012, 2014
World Baseball Classic champion	1	2017

Awards and Honors
Name of award	Times	Dates
Lou Gehrig Memorial Award	1	2022
MLB All-Star	3	2015, 2018, 2021
Rawlings Gold Glove Award at shortstop	4	2015, 2016, 2017 2021
Silver Slugger Award at shortstop	1	2015
Willie Mac Award	1	2012
Wilson Defensive Player of the Year Award	2	2012, 2016

National League statistical leader
Category	Times	Seasons
Triples	1	2016

== Post-playing career ==
On April 26, 2025 at Oracle Park, the Giants organization, which ranged from alumni, coaches, executives, and former players, honored Crawford in a pregame ceremony. Crawford was also surrounded by his family. "Brandon Crawford Celebration Day" was broadcast live on local television on NBC Sports Bay Area.

== Personal life ==
Crawford married former UCLA gymnast Jalynne Dantzscher in Kona, Hawaii, on November 26, 2011. They have three daughters and two sons. They reside in Scottsdale, Arizona.

Crawford is the brother-in-law of Olympic gymnast Jamie Dantzscher. Crawford's sister Amy is married to pitcher Gerrit Cole. His sister-in-law, Jennifer Pippin (the sister of Crawford's wife), died in 2017 due to an asthma attack.

Since 2017, Crawford has hosted the Crawford Family Charity Golf Tournament, raising funds for research to cure ALS. In 2022, Crawford was named the recipient of the Lou Gehrig Memorial Award.

== See also ==
- List of Major League Baseball annual triples leaders
- List of Major League Baseball career assists as a shortstop leaders
- List of Major League Baseball career games played as a shortstop leaders
- List of Major League Baseball single-game hits leaders
- List of University of California, Los Angeles people
