= 2008 San Francisco Giants season =

Major League Baseball season

2008 San Francisco Giants
- League: National League
- Division: West
- Ballpark: AT&T Park
- City: San Francisco
- Record: 72–90 (.444)
- Divisional place: 4th
- Owners: Peter Magowan (managing general partner)
- General managers: Brian Sabean
- Managers: Bruce Bochy
- Television: KNTV (NBC 11); CSN Bay Area
- Radio: KNBR (680AM); KLOK (Spanish)

The 2008 San Francisco Giants season was the Giants' 126th year in Major League Baseball, and their ninth at AT&T Park. The team finished in fourth place in the National League West with a 72–90 record, 12 games behind the Los Angeles Dodgers. 2008 marks their 50th Anniversary in the Bay Area since moving from New York in 1958. It is also their first since 1992 without all-time home run champion Barry Bonds, who was not re-signed following the 2007 season. At the end of the season, Tim Lincecum was voted the 2008 National League Cy Young Award winner.

== Pre-season ==
On September 21, 2007, Giants' ownership announced that Bonds would not return after the 2007 season. The Giants did not resign Ryan Klesko and Pedro Feliz. On December 12, 2007, the Giants signed Aaron Rowand to a five-year and $60 million contract.

The Giants finished spring training with a record of 9–23–2, the worst spring training in their recorded history. The Giants had the highest ERA and the lowest batting average among teams whose spring training was in Arizona. The team lead the majors with 40 errors. The Giants lost a spring training game 4–3 to their Triple-A affiliate Fresno Grizzlies. Giants opening day starter Barry Zito allowed 24 earned runs in 25 innings in spring training.

Giants spring training included injuries and competitions for several roster positions. Steve Holm won the back up catcher spot against Eliezer Alfonzo and Guillermo Rodríguez. Relievers Merkin Valdez, Erick Threets, and Keiichi Yabu earned spots on the opening day roster. Noah Lowry, Vinnie Chulk, Kevin Frandsen and Omar Vizquel started the season on the disabled list. Brian Bocock was the opening day shortstop in place of Vizquel. Steve Kline was designated for assignment. The Giants claimed Jose Castillo off waivers from the Florida Marlins late March 2008. He was the opening day third baseman. Kevin Correia won the competition to be the team's 5th starter.

The Giants were widely expected to miss the playoffs in 2008, according to numerous sports writers.

== Regular season ==
On May 16, 2008, Peter Magowan, the owner who brought Barry Bonds to San Francisco, built a new ballpark and kept major league baseball in the city, announced he would be stepping down as the managing partner of the Giants. Effective October 1, 2008 Bill Neukom would be the new managing partner of the Giants.

=== Season standings ===
NL West
Team	W	L	Pct.	GB	Home	Road
Los Angeles Dodgers	84	78	.519	—	48‍–‍33	36‍–‍45
Arizona Diamondbacks	82	80	.506	2	48‍–‍33	34‍–‍47
Colorado Rockies	74	88	.457	10	43‍–‍38	31‍–‍50
San Francisco Giants	72	90	.444	12	37‍–‍44	35‍–‍46
San Diego Padres	63	99	.389	21	35‍–‍46	28‍–‍53

=== Record vs. opponents ===
2008 National League record Source: MLB Standings Grid – 2008
Team	AZ	ATL	CHC	CIN	COL	FLA	HOU	LAD	MIL	NYM	PHI	PIT	SD	SF	STL	WAS	AL
Arizona	–	3–5	2–4	2–4	15–3	2–7	4–2	8–10	2–5	3–3	3–4	4–3	10–8	11–7	3–4	4–2	6–9
Atlanta	5–3	–	0–6	3–3	4–3	10–8	3–3	4–2	3–6	11–7	4–14	2–5	5–1	2–5	2–5	6–12	8–7
Chicago	4–2	6–0	–	8–7	5–1	4–3	8–9	5–2	9–7	4–2	3–4	14–4	5–2	4–3	9–6	3–3	6–9
Cincinnati	4–2	3–3	7–8	–	1–5	6–2	3–12	1–7	10–8	3–4	3–5	6–9	4–3	5–1	5–10	4–3	9–6
Colorado	3–15	3–4	1–5	5–1	–	5–3	3–3	8–10	4–3	3–6	0–5	5–2	9–9	11–7	3–4	4–3	7–8
Florida	7–2	8–10	3–4	2–6	3–5	–	4–2	3–4	5–1	8–10	10–8	3–2	4–2	3–3	2–5	14–3	5–10
Houston	2–4	3–3	9–8	12–3	3–3	2–4	–	4–3	7–8	5–2	3–4	8–8	3–3	7–1	7–8	4–2	7–11
Los Angeles	10–8	2–4	2–5	7–1	10–8	4–3	3–4	–	4–2	3–4	4–4	5–2	11–7	9–9	2–4	3–3	5–10
Milwaukee	5–2	6–3	7–9	8–10	3–4	1–5	8–7	2–4	–	2–4	1–5	14–1	4–3	6–0	10–5	6–2	7–8
New York	3–3	7–11	2–4	4–3	6–3	10–8	2–5	4–3	4–2	–	11–7	4–3	2–5	5–1	4–3	12–6	9–6
Philadelphia	4–3	14–4	4–3	5–3	5–0	8–10	4–3	4–4	5–1	7–11	–	4–2	4–2	3–3	5–4	12–6	4–11
Pittsburgh	3–4	5–2	4–14	9–6	2–5	2–3	8–8	2–5	1–14	3–4	2–4	–	3–4	4–2	10–7	3–4	6–9
San Diego	8–10	1–5	2–5	3–4	9–9	2–4	3–3	7–11	3–4	5–2	2–4	4–3	–	5–13	1–6	5–1	3–15
San Francisco	7–11	5–2	3–4	1–5	7–11	3–3	1–7	9–9	0–6	1–5	3–3	2–4	13–5	–	4–3	7–0	6–12
St. Louis	4–3	5–2	6–9	10–5	4–3	5–2	8–7	4–2	5–10	3–4	4–5	7–10	6–1	3–4	–	5–1	7–8
Washington	2–4	12–6	3–3	3–4	3–4	3–14	2–4	3–3	2–6	6–12	6–12	4–3	1–5	0–7	1–5	–	8–10

=== Game log ===
2008 Game Log
March/April

#	Date	Opponent	Score	Win	Loss	Save	Attendance	Record
1	March 31	@ Dodgers	5–0	Penny (1–0)	Zito (0–1)		56,000	0–1
2	April 1	@ Dodgers	3–2	Saito (1–0)	Yabu (0–1)		44,054	0–2
3	April 2	@ Dodgers	2–1	Lincecum (1–0)	Loaiza (0–1)	Wilson (1)	43,217	1–2
4	April 4	@ Brewers	13–4	Villanueva (1–0)	Sánchez (0–1)	Torres (1)	45,212	1–3
5	April 5	@ Brewers	5–4	Parra (1–0)	Correia (0–1)	Gagné (1)	30,574	1–4
6	April 6	@ Brewers	7–0	Sheets (1–0)	Zito (0–2)		44,014	1–5
7	April 7	Padres	8–4	Maddux (1–0)	Cain (0–1)		42,861	1–6
8	April 8	Padres	3–2	Hennessey (1–0)	Meredith (0–1)		35,795	2–6
9	April 9	Padres	1–0	Walker (1–0)	Bell (0–1)		30,310	3–6
10	April 10	Cardinals	5–1	Correia (1–1)	Wainwright (1–1)	Wilson (2)	30,333	4–6
11	April 11	Cardinals	8–2	Lohse (2–0)	Zito (0–3)		33,954	4–7
12	April 12	Cardinals	8–7 (10)	Isringhausen (1–0)	Threets (0–1)	Reyes (1)	35,717	4–8
13	April 13	Cardinals	7–4	Lincecum (2–0)	Piñeiro (0–1)	Wilson (3)	37,195	5–8
14	April 14	D-backs	5–4	Yabu (1–1)	Qualls (0–1)	Wilson (4)	30,371	6–8
15	April 15	D-backs	8–2	Owings (3–0)	Correia (1–2)		30,068	6–9
16	April 16	D-backs	4–1	Webb (4–0)	Zito (0–4)	Lyon (3)	30,510	6–10
17	April 18	@ Cardinals	11–1	Wellemeyer (2–0)	Cain (0–2)		40,684	6–11
18	April 19	@ Cardinals	3–0	Lincecum (3–0)	Piñeiro (0–2)	Wilson (5)	41,707	7–11
19	April 20	@ Cardinals	8–2	Sánchez (1–1)	Looper (3–1)		41,127	8–11
20	April 21	@ D-backs	4–2	Owings (4–0)	Correia (1–3)	Lyon (4)	22,097	8–12
21	April 22	@ D-backs	5–4	Webb (5–0)	Zito (0–5)	Lyon (5)	25,074	8–13
22	April 23	@ Padres	3–2 (13)	Yabu (2–1)	Rusch (0–2)	Wilson (6)	25,506	9–13
23	April 24	@ Padres	1–0	Lincecum (4–0)	Young (1–2)	Wilson (7)	26,789	10–13
24	April 25	Reds	3–1	Sánchez (2–1)	Harang (1–3)	Wilson (8)	34,657	11–13
25	April 26	Reds	10–9	Belisle (1–1)	Hennessey (1–1)	Cordero (3)	34,215	11–14
26	April 27	Reds	10–1	Vólquez (4–0)	Zito (0–6)		39,050	11–15
27	April 28	Rockies	4–0	Cain (1–2)	Morales (1–2)		30,153	12–15
28	April 29	Rockies	3–2	Cook (4–1)	Lincecum (4–1)	Fuentes (2)	32,176	12–16
29	April 30	Rockies	3–2	Valdez (1–0)	Speier (1–2)	Wilson (9)	30,509	13–16

May

#	Date	Opponent	Score	Win	Loss	Save	Attendance	Record
30	May 2	@ Phillies	6–5 (10)	Romero (2–0)	Wilson (0–1)		38,270	13–17
31	May 3	@ Phillies	3–2 (10)	Taschner (1–0)	Seánez (2–2)	Wilson (10)	43,804	14–17
32	May 4	@ Phillies	6–5	Lidge (1–0)	Yabu (2–2)		45,110	14–18
33	May 6	@ Pirates	12–6	Duke (1–2)	Sánchez (2–2)		12,030	14–19
34	May 7	@ Pirates	3–1	Dumatrait (1–1)	Zito (0–7)	Capps (7)	9,788	14–20
35	May 8	@ Pirates	5–4	Osoria (2–1)	Cain (1–3)	Capps (8)	16,816	14–21
36	May 9	Phillies	7–4	Hamels (4–3)	Walker (1–1)	Lidge (9)	33,796	14–22
37	May 10	Phillies	8–2	Lincecum (5–1)	Moyer (2–3)		34,064	15–22
38	May 11	Phillies	4–3	Taschner (2–0)	Romero (3–1)	Wilson (11)	35,999	16–22
39	May 12	Astros	7–3	Oswalt (4–3)	Chulk (0–1)	Valderde (9)	30,165	16–23
40	May 13	Astros	4–2	Cain (2–3)	Backe (2–5)	Wilson (12)	30,858	17–23
41	May 14	Astros	6–3	Villarreal (1–3)	Taschner (2–1)	Valverde (10)	33,070	17–24
42	May 15	Astros	8–7	Byrdak (2–0)	Chulk (0–2)	Valverde (11)	33,771	17–25
43	May 16	White Sox	2–0	Floyd (4–2)	Sánchez (2–3)	Jenks (9)	35,482	17–26
44	May 17	White Sox	3–1	Buehrle (2–5)	Zito (0–8)	Jenks (10)	37,006	17–27
45	May 18	White Sox	13–8	Thornton (1–0)	Walker (1–2)	Masset (1)	34,331	17–28
46	May 19	@ Rockies	4–3	Grilli (1–0)	Chulk (0–3)	Fuentes (6)	28,362	17–29
47	May 20	@ Rockies	6–5	Lincecum (6–1)	Cook (6–3)	Wilson (13)	28,361	18–29
48	May 21	@ Rockies	3–2 (10)	Walker (2–2)	Herges (2–1)	Wilson (14)	27,081	19–29
49	May 23	@ Marlins	8–2	Zito (1–8)	Olsen (4–2)		15,003	20–29
–	May 24	@ Marlins	Postponed (rain) Rescheduled for May 25					
50	May 25	@ Marlins	8–6	Hendrickson (7–2)	Misch (0–1)	Gregg (10)		20–30
51	May 25	@ Marlins	5–4	Gregg (4–2)	Walker (2–3)		14,674	20–31
52	May 27	@ D-backs	6–3	Lincecum (7–1)	Haren (5–4)	Wilson (15)	23,604	21–31
53	May 28	@ D-backs	11–3	Sánchez (3–3)	Davis (2–2)		24,336	22–31
54	May 29	@ D-backs	4–3	Walker (3–3)	Qualls (0–5)	Wilson (16)	21,037	23–31
55	May 30	Padres	7–3 (13)	Baek (1–0)	Sadler (0–1)		37,178	23–32
56	May 31	Padres	5–1	Banks (2–0)	Misch (0–2)		34,921	23–33

June

#	Date	Opponent	Score	Win	Loss	Save	Attendance	Record
57	June 1	Padres	4–3 (10)	Hinshaw (1–0)	Hoffman (0–4)		33,867	24–33
58	June 2	Mets	10–2	Sánchez (4–3)	Pérez (4–4)		36,126	25–33
59	June 3	Mets	9–6	Martínez (1–0)	Zito (1–9)	Wagner (12)	35,233	25–34
60	June 4	Mets	5–3	Maine (6–4)	Cain (2–4)	Wagner (13)	35,646	25–35
61	June 6	@ Nationals	10–1	Lincecum (8–1)	Bergmann (1–3)		25,987	26–35
62	June 7	@ Nationals	6–0	Sánchez (5–3)	Hill (0–3)		30,652	27–35
63	June 8	@ Nationals	6–3	Zito (2–9)	Mock (0–1)	Wilson (17)	30,224	28–35
64	June 9	@ Nationals	3–2	Cain (3–4)	Clippard (0–1)	Wilson (18)	26,209	29–35
65	June 10	@ Rockies	10–5	Cook (9–3)	Misch (0–3)		28,359	29–36
66	June 11	@ Rockies	1–0	Fuentes (1–2)	Yabu		26,235	29–37
67	June 12	@ Rockies	10–7	Sánchez (6–3)	Reynolds (1–4)	Wilson (19)	30,376	30–37
68	June 13	Athletics	5–1	Smith (4–5)	Zito (2–10)		42,445	30–38
69	June 14	Athletics	4–0	Harden (4–0)	Cain (3–5)		40,873	30–39
70	June 15	Athletics	5–3	Eveland (5–5)	Correia (1–4)	Street (13)	41,547	30–40
71	June 16	Tigers	8–6	Yabu (3–3)	Dolsi (0–2)		33,317	31–40
72	June 17	Tigers	5–1	Rogers (5–4)	Sánchez (6–4)		33,636	31–41
73	June 18	Tigers	7–2	Galarraga (7–2)	Zito (2–11)		38,194	31–42
74	June 20	@ Royals	9–4	Cain (4–5)	Yabuta (1–3)		34,588	32–42
75	June 21	@ Royals	5–3	Meche (5–8)	Correia (1–5)	Soria (19)	28,903	32–43
76	June 22	@ Royals	11–10	Mahay (3–0)	Hinshaw (1–1)	Soria (20)	20,499	32–44
77	June 24	@ Indians	3–2	Sánchez (7–4)	Betancourt (2–4)	Wilson (20)	29,024	33–44
78	June 25	@ Indians	4–1	Zito (3–11)	Sowers (0–3)	Wilson (21)	25,654	34–44
79	June 26	@ Indians	4–1	Lee (11–1)	Cain (4–6)	Borowski (6)	25,257	34–45
80	June 27	@ Athletics	4–1	Eveland (6–5)	Yabu (3–4)	Street (15)	27,125	34–46
81	June 28	@ Athletics	1–0	Lincecum (9–1)	Duchscherer (8–5)	Wilson (22)	36,067	35–46
82	June 29	@ Athletics	11–1	Sánchez (8–4)	Blanton (4–11)		33,841	36–46
83	June 30	Cubs	9–2	Lilly (9–5)	Zito (3–12)		35,311	36–47

July

#	Date	Opponent	Score	Win	Loss	Save	Attendance	Record
84	July 1	Cubs	2–1	Cain (5–6)	Marquis (6–5)	Wilson (23)	33,858	37–47
85	July 2	Cubs	6–5	Mármol (2–3)	Walker (3–4)	Wood (21)	41,345	37–48
86	July 3	Cubs	8–3	Lincecum (10–1)	Gallagher (3–4)		40,511	38–48
87	July 4	Dodgers	10–7	Lowe (6–8)	Matos (0–1)	Saito (15)	40,447	38–49
88	July 5	Dodgers	5–2	Zito (4–12)	Falkenborg (0–1)	Wilson (24)	40,741	39–49
89	July 6	Dodgers	5–3	Falkenborg (1–1)	Cain (5–7)	Saito (16)	39,290	39–50
90	July 8	@ Mets	7–0	Pelfrey (7–6)	Lincecum (10–2)		48,887	39–51
91	July 9	@ Mets	5–0	Santana (8–7)	Sánchez (8–5)		48,896	39–52
92	July 10	@ Mets	7–3	Schoeneweis (1–2)	Romo (0–1)		48,755	39–53
93	July 11	@ Cubs	3–1	Howry (3–2)	Walker (3–5)	Wood (24)	41,605	39–54
94	July 12	@ Cubs	8–7 (11)	Marshall (2–2)	Wilson (0–2)		41,555	39–55
95	July 13	@ Cubs	4–2	Lincecum (11–2)	Dempster (10–4)	Wilson (25)	41,574	40–55
96	July 18	Brewers	9–1	Sabathia (9–8)	Cain (5–8)		40,882	40–56
97	July 19	Brewers	8–5	Villanueva (4–5)	Matos (0–2)	Torres (16)	36,852	40–57
98	July 20	Brewers	7–4	Parra (9–2)	Lincecum (11–3)	Torres (17)	37,507	40–58
99	July 22	Nationals	6–3	Zito (5–12)	Bergmann (1–7)	Wilson (26)	34,813	41–58
100	July 23	Nationals	6–4	Espineli (1–0)	Ayala (1–6)	Wilson (27)	35,539	42–58
101	July 24	Nationals	1–0	Cain (6–8)	Redding (7–5)		36,963	43–58
102	July 25	D-backs	10–2	Haren (10–5)	Sánchez (8–6)		32,851	43–59
103	July 26	D-backs	5–3	Webb (14–4)	Walker (3–6)	Lyon (21)	37,094	43–60
104	July 27	D-backs	7–2	Johnson (8–7)	Zito (5–13)		40,071	43–61
105	July 28	@ Dodgers	7–6	Correia (2–5)	Kuroda (5–8)	Wilson (28)	37,483	44–61
106	July 29	@ Dodgers	2–0	Johnson (1–0)	Cain (6–9)	Broxton (5)	40,110	44–62
107	July 30	@ Dodgers	4–0	Billingsley (11–9)	Sánchez (8–7)		41,282	44–63

August

#	Date	Opponent	Score	Win	Loss	Save	Attendance	Record
108	August 1	@ Padres	3–2 (10)	Romo (1–1)	Hoffman (1–6)	Wilson (29)	33,926	45–63
109	August 2	@ Padres	2–0	Zito (6–13)	Peavy (8–7)	Wilson (30)	41,688	46–63
110	August 3	@ Padres	4–1	Maddux (5–8)	Correia (2–6)	Hoffman (23)	33,060	46–64
111	August 4	Braves	4–2	Cain (7–9)	Jurrjens (10–7)	Wilson (31)	37,473	47–64
112	August 5	Braves	11–4	Hampton (1–0)	Sánchez (8–8)		36,098	47–65
113	August 6	Braves	3–2	Lincecum (12–3)	James (2–5)	Wilson (32)	39,955	48–65
114	August 8	Dodgers	6–2	Penny (6–9)	Zito (6–14)	Broxton (7)	40,142	48–66
115	August 9	Dodgers	3–2 (10)	Walker (4–6)	Broxton (2–3)		41,963	49–66
116	August 10	Dodgers	5–4	Taschner (3–1)	Kuo (3–2)		41,804	50–66
117	August 11	@ Astros	3–1	Backe (7–11)	Sánchez (8–9)	Valverde (29)	28,220	50–67
118	August 12	@ Astros	12–4	Oswalt (10–8)	Walker (4–7)		29,451	50–68
119	August 13	@ Astros	6–2	Wolf (8–10)	Zito (6–15)		30,330	50–69
120	August 14	@ Astros	7–4	Hawkins (2–1)	Yabu (3–5)	Valverde (30)	33,612	50–70
121	August 15	@ Braves	5–1	Cain (8–9)	Jurrjens (11–8)		30,682	51–70
122	August 16	@ Braves	11–5	Hampton (2–1)	Palmer (0–1)		41,893	51–71
123	August 17	@ Braves	3–1	Lincecum (13–3)	Morton (3–7)	Wilson (33)	30,503	52–71
124	August 18	@ Braves	5–0	Zito (7–15)	Campillo (7–6)		18,113	53–71
125	August 19	Marlins	6–0	Nolasco (12–7)	Correia (2–7)		33,098	53–72
126	August 20	Marlins	6–5	Wilson (1–2)	Lindstrom (1–2)		30,399	54–72
127	August 21	Marlins	4–3	Wilson (2–2)	Gregg (6–6)		32,515	55–72
128	August 22	Padres	5–0	Lincecum (14–3)	Baek (4–9)		33,615	56–72
129	August 23	Padres	4–3	Zito (8–15)	Adams (1–2)	Wilson (34)	37,081	57–72
130	August 24	Padres	7–4	Correia (3–7)	Adams (1–3)	Wilson (35)	37,174	58–72
131	August 25	Rockies	4–2	Francis (4–8)	Cain (8–10)	Fuentes (26)	31,132	58–73
132	August 26	Rockies	7–2	de la Rosa (7–7)	Palmer (0–2)	Grilli (1)	32,695	58–74
133	August 27	Rockies	4–1	Lincecum (15–3)	Hernández (11–11)	Wilson (36)	31,627	59–74
134	August 29	@ Reds	11–7	Vólquez (16–5)	Zito (8–16)		25,445	59–75
135	August 30	@ Reds	7–6	Lincoln (2–5)	Taschner (3–2)	Cordero (26)	21,729	59–76
136	August 31	@ Reds	9–3	Arroyo (13–10)	Cain (8–11)		26,519	59–77

September

#	Date	Opponent	Score	Win	Loss	Save	Attendance	Record
137	September 1	@ Rockies	4–0	de la Rosa (8–7)	Sánchez (8–10)		31,388	59–78
138	September 2	@ Rockies	6–5 (12)	Grilli (3–2)	Yabu (3–6)		23,710	59–79
139	September 3	@ Rockies	9–2	Zito (9–16)	Cook (16–9)		23,481	60–79
140	September 5	Pirates	7–0	Duke (5–13)	Correia (3–8)		31,133	60–80
141	September 6	Pirates	7–6	Espineli (2–0)	Bautista (4–3)	Wilson (37)	38,094	61–80
142	September 7	Pirates	11–6	Matos (1–2)	Karstens (2–5)		34,122	62–80
143	September 8	D-backs	6–2	Lincecum (16–3)	Petit (3–5)		30,252	63–80
144	September 9	D-backs	5–4	Wilson (3–2)	Rauch (4–7)		30,518	64–80
145	September 10	D-backs	4–3	Hinshaw (2–1)	Lyon (2–5)		30,992	65–80
146	September 11	@ Padres	11–3	Geer (2–0)	Cain (8–12)		30,497	65–81
147	September 12	@ Padres	5–2	Sánchez (9–10)	Peavy (9–11)	Wilson (38)	24,610	66–81
148	September 13	@ Padres	7–0	Lincecum (17–3)	Young (5–6)		31,015	67–81
149	September 14	@ Padres	8–6 (10)	Romo (2–1)	Hayhurst (0–2)	Wilson (39)	25,476	68–81
150	September 15	@ D-backs	3–1	Peña (2–2)	Hennessey (1–2)	Qualls (4)	25,969	68–82
151	September 16	@ D-backs	2–0	Haren (15–8)	Cain (8–13)		33,195	68–83
152	September 17	@ D-backs	7–6	Webb (21–7)	Sánchez (9–11)	Peña (3)	22,618	68–84
153	September 18	@ D-backs	3–2	Cruz (3–0)	Lincecum (17–4)	Qualls (5)	34,323	68–85
154	September 19	@ Dodgers	7–1	Zito (10–16)	Maddux (7–13)		55,589	69–85
155	September 20	@ Dodgers	10–7	Saito (4–3)	Walker (4–8)		55,724	69–86
156	September 21	@ Dodgers	1–0 (11)	Romo (3–1)	Saito (4–4)	Wilson (40)	55,294	70–86
157	September 23	Rockies	9–4	Jiménez (12–12)	Lincecum (17–5)		33,922	70–87
158	September 24	Rockies	15–6	Hernández (3–3)	Sánchez (9–12)		31,942	70–88
159	September 25	Rockies	3–1	de la Rosa (10–8)	Zito (10–17)	Fuentes (30)	31,857	70–89
160	September 26	Dodgers	6–5 (10)	Walker (5–8)	Johnson (1–2)		33,920	71–89
161	September 27	Dodgers	2–1	Maddux (8–13)	Cain (8–14)	Saito (18)	38,673	71–90
162	September 28	Dodgers	3–1	Lincecum (18–5)	Park (4–4)		39,167	72–90

=== Roster ===
2008 San Francisco Giants
Roster
Pitchers: 18 Matt Cain; 39,31 Vinnie Chulk; 32 Kevin Correia; 43 Geno Espineli; 41 Brad Hennessey; 52 Alex Hinshaw; 55 Tim Lincecum; 56 Osiris Matos; 16 Patrick Misch; 32 Matt Palmer; 54 Sergio Romo; 34 Billy Sadler; 53 Jonathan Sánchez; 37 Jack Taschner; 48 Erick Threets; 47 Merkin Valdez; 45 Tyler Walker; 38 Brian Wilson; 22 Keiichi Yabu; 75 Barry Zito	Catchers: 50 Eliézer Alfonzo; 20 Steve Holm; 1 Bengie Molina; Infielders: 35 Rich Aurilia; 29 Brian Bocock; 70,21 John Bowker; 7 Emmanuel Burriss; 12 José Castillo; 28 Travis Denker; 5 Ray Durham; 50 Conor Gillaspie; 5 Travis Ishikawa; 29 Scott McClain; 23 Ivan Ochoa; 40 Daniel Ortmeier; 57 Ryan Rohlinger; 48 Pablo Sandoval; 6 J. T. Snow; 8 Eugenio Vélez; 13 Omar Vizquel	Outfielders: 28 Rajai Davis; 49 Brian Horwitz; 14 Fred Lewis; 10 Dave Roberts; 33 Aaron Rowand; 12 Nate Schierholtz; 49 Clay Timpner; 2 Randy Winn; Other batters: 19 Kevin Frandsen	Manager: 15 Bruce Bochy; Coaches: 6 Tim Flannery (third base); 26 Mark Gardner (bullpen); 39 Roberto Kelly (first base); 9 Carney Lansford (hitting); 46 Dave Righetti (pitching); 17 Ron Wotus (bench)

== Player stats ==
=== Batting ===
Note: G = Games played; AB = At bats; R = Runs; H = Hits; 2B = Doubles; 3B = Triples; HR = Home runs; RBI = Runs batted in; SB = Stolen bases; BB = Walks; AVG = Batting average; SLG = Slugging percentage

Player	G	AB	R	H	2B	3B	HR	RBI	SB	BB	AVG	SLG
Randy Winn	155	598	84	183	38	2	10	64	25	59	.306	.426
Aaron Rowand	152	549	57	149	37	0	13	70	2	44	.271	.410
Bengie Molina	145	530	46	155	33	0	16	95	0	19	.292	.445
Fred Lewis	133	468	81	132	25	11	9	40	21	51	.282	.440
Rich Aurilia	140	407	33	115	21	1	10	52	1	30	.283	.413
José Castillo	112	394	42	96	28	4	6	35	2	25	.244	.381
John Bowker	111	326	31	83	14	3	10	43	1	19	.255	.408
Eugenio Vélez	98	275	32	72	16	7	1	30	15	14	.262	.382
Omar Vizquel	92	266	24	59	10	1	0	23	5	24	.222	.267
Ray Durham	87	263	43	77	23	0	3	32	6	38	.293	.414
Emmanuel Burriss	94	240	37	68	6	1	1	18	13	23	.283	.329
Pablo Sandoval	41	145	24	50	10	1	3	24	0	4	.345	.490
Iván Ochoa	47	120	7	24	8	0	0	3	0	4	.200	.267
Dave Roberts	52	107	18	24	2	2	0	9	5	20	.224	.280
Travis Ishikawa	33	95	12	26	6	0	3	15	1	9	.274	.432
Steve Holm	49	84	10	22	9	0	1	6	0	10	.262	.405
Brian Bocock	32	77	4	11	1	0	0	2	4	12	.143	.156
Nate Schierholtz	19	75	12	24	8	1	1	5	0	3	.320	.493
Daniel Ortmeier	38	64	4	14	6	0	0	5	2	7	.219	.313
Travis Denker	24	37	6	9	4	1	1	3	0	5	.243	.486
Brian Horwitz	21	36	5	8	0	0	2	4	0	5	.222	.389
Scott McClain	14	33	7	9	1	0	2	7	0	5	.273	.485
Ryan Rohlinger	21	32	2	3	1	1	0	2	0	1	.094	.188
Rajai Davis	12	18	2	1	0	0	0	0	4	1	.056	.056
Eliézer Alfonzo	5	11	0	1	0	0	0	1	0	0	.091	.091
Conor Gillaspie	8	5	1	1	0	0	0	0	0	2	.200	.200
Clay Timpner	2	2	0	0	0	0	0	0	0	0	.000	.000
Kevin Frandsen	1	1	0	0	0	0	0	0	0	0	.000	.000
J.T. Snow	1	0	0	0	0	0	0	0	0	0	.---	.---
Pitcher totals	162	285	16	36	4	1	2	18	1	18	.126	.168
Team totals	162	5543	640	1452	311	37	94	606	'108	452	.262	.382

=== Pitching ===
Note: W = Wins; L = Losses; ERA = Earned run average; G = Games pitched; GS = Games started; SV = Saves; IP = Innings pitched; H = Hits allowed; R = Runs allowed; ER = Earned runs allowed; BB = Walks allowed; SO = Strikeouts

Player	W	L	ERA	G	GS	SV	IP	H	R	ER	BB	SO
Tim Lincecum	18	5	2.62	34	33	0	227.0	182	72	66	84	265
Matt Cain	8	14	3.76	34	34	0	217.2	206	95	91	91	186
Barry Zito	10	17	5.15	32	32	0	180.0	186	115	103	102	120
Jonathan Sánchez	9	12	5.01	29	29	0	158.0	154	90	88	75	157
Kevin Correia	3	8	6.05	25	19	0	110.0	141	80	74	47	66
Keiichi Yabu	3	6	3.57	60	0	0	68.0	63	33	27	32	48
Brian Wilson	3	2	4.62	63	0	41	62.1	62	32	32	28	67
Tyler Walker	5	8	4.56	65	0	0	53.1	47	29	27	21	49
Pat Misch	0	3	5.68	15	7	0	52.1	56	34	33	15	38
Jack Taschner	3	2	4.88	67	0	0	48.0	57	27	26	24	39
Billy Sadler	0	1	4.06	33	0	0	44.1	34	21	20	27	42
Brad Hennessey	1	2	7.81	17	4	0	40.1	63	35	35	15	21
Alex Hinshaw	2	1	3.40	48	0	0	39.2	31	16	15	29	47
Sergio Romo	3	1	2.12	29	0	0	34.0	16	13	8	8	33
Vinnie Chulk	0	3	4.83	27	0	0	31.2	33	18	17	8	16
Osiris Matos	1	2	4.79	20	0	0	20.2	26	17	11	9	16
Geno Espineli	2	0	5.06	15	0	0	16.0	17	10	9	8	8
Merkin Valdez	1	0	1.69	17	1	0	16.0	14	5	3	7	13
Matt Palmer	0	2	8.53	3	3	0	12.2	17	13	12	13	3
Erick Threets	0	1	3.60	7	0	0	10.0	11	4	4	9	6
Team totals	72	90	4.38	162	162	41	1442.0	1416	759	701	652	1240

== Awards and honors ==
- Bengie Molina C, Willie Mac Award

All-Star Game

== Farm system ==
Level	Team	League	Manager
AAA	Fresno Grizzlies	Pacific Coast League	Dan Rohn
AA	Connecticut Defenders	Eastern League	Bien Figueroa
A	San Jose Giants	California League	Steve Decker
A	Augusta GreenJackets	South Atlantic League	Andy Skeels
A-Short Season	Salem-Keizer Volcanoes	Northwest League	Tom Trebelhorn
Rookie	AZL Giants	Arizona League	Dave Machemer

LEAGUE CHAMPIONS: Augusta, AZL Giants
