= Alex Hinshaw =

American baseball player (born 1982)

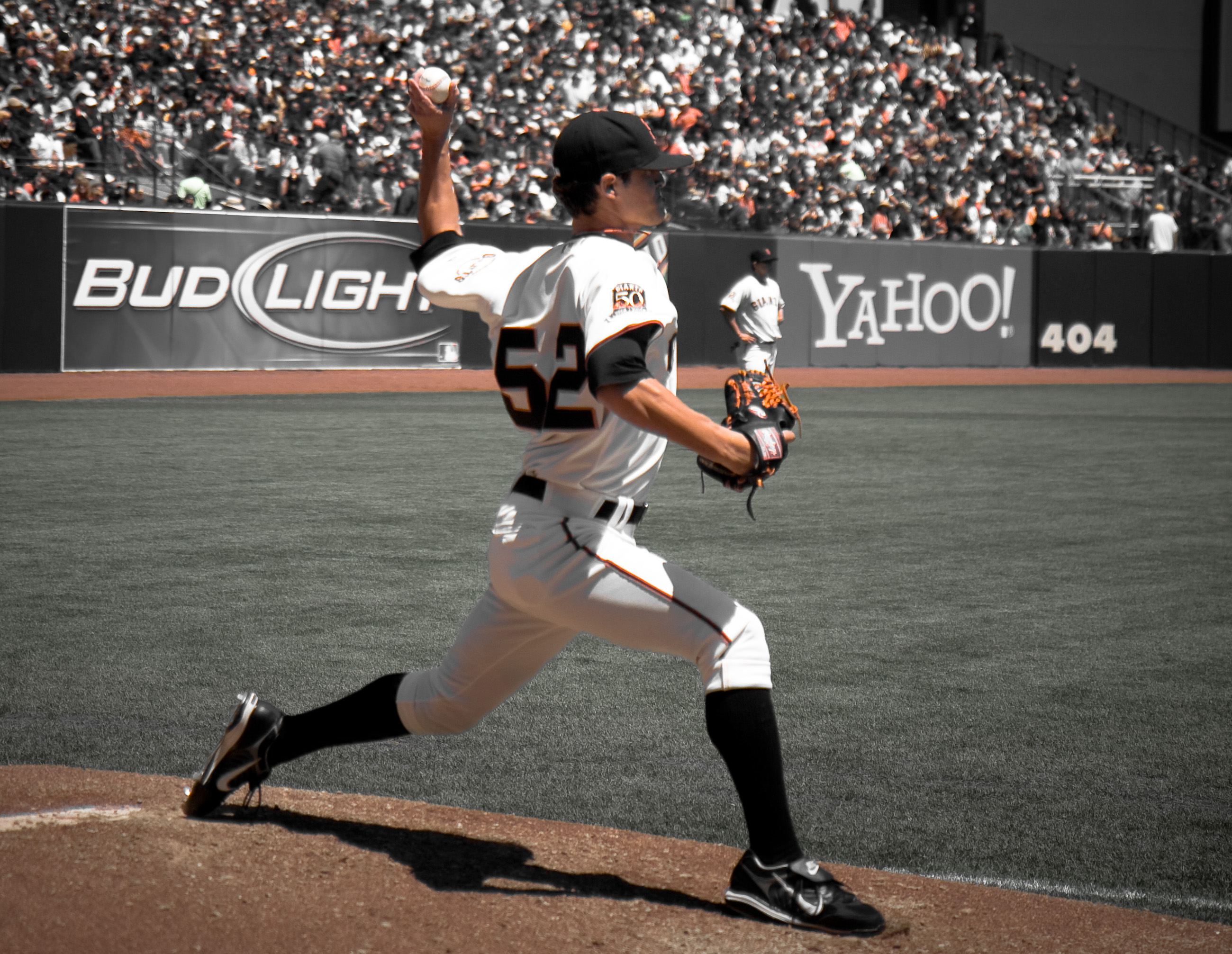
- Hinshaw with the San Francisco Giants
- Pitcher
- Born: October 31, 1982 (age 44); Pomona, California, U.S.
- Batted: Left Threw: Left

MLB debut
- May 15, 2008, for the San Francisco Giants

Last MLB appearance
- August 27, 2012, for the Chicago Cubs

MLB statistics
- Win–loss record: 3–2
- Earned run average: 5.11
- Strikeouts: 85
- Stats at Baseball Reference

Teams
- San Francisco Giants (2008–2009); San Diego Padres (2012); Chicago Cubs (2012)

Alexander "Alex" Omar Hinshaw (born October 31, 1982) is an American former professional baseball pitcher. He graduated from Claremont High School and attended Chaffey College and San Diego State University. He played in Major League Baseball for the San Francisco Giants, San Diego Padres and Chicago Cubs from 2008 to 2012.

== Background ==
Hinshaw was born in California to an American father and Afghan mother.

=== San Francisco Giants ===
Hinshaw was drafted by the San Francisco Giants in 28th round of the 2000 First-Year Player draft, the 29th round of the 2002 draft, and by the Florida Marlins in the 25th round of the 2003 draft, but did not sign. In the 2005 draft, he was once again selected by the Giants in the 15th round and made his professional debut with the Class A Salem-Keizer Volcanoes. He finished with a 3.68 ERA in 25 relief appearances, struck out 33 batters and walked 18 in 22 innings.

For the advanced Class A San Jose Giants in 2006, Hinshaw had a 6–3 record with a 4.26 ERA in 30 games, giving up 58 hits and striking out 78 in 69 2/3 innings. He struck out a season high nine batters in five shutout innings to earn a win on May 11, 2006. On May 15, 2008, Hinshaw made his major league debut after being called up when Merkin Valdéz went on the disabled list. Facing the Houston Astros, he gave up one hit and struck out one in 1/3 of an inning.

He was designated for assignment on August 4, 2011, he cleared waivers and was sent outright to Triple-A on August 9. He elected free agency following the season on November 2.

=== San Diego Padres ===
On November 23, 2011, Hinshaw signed a minor league contract with the San Diego Padres. He had his contract selected to the major league roster on May 8. He was designated for assignment on August 14, 2012,

=== Chicago Cubs ===
On August 19, 2012, Hinshaw was claimed off waivers by the Chicago Cubs. He was designated for assignment on August 28, he cleared waivers and was sent outright to Triple-A Iowa Cubs on August 31. On October 6, 2012, Hinshaw elected free agency. In 37 games with the Padres, Hinshaw had a 4.50 ERA while striking out 36 in 28 innings. In two appearances with the Cubs, Hinshaw had a 135.00 ERA, giving up five runs while recording one out.

=== Toronto Blue Jays ===
On November 21, 2012, the Toronto Blue Jays announced that Hinshaw had been signed to a minor league contract with an invitation to spring training. Hinshaw started the 2013 season with the Triple-A Buffalo Bisons but encountered troubles with walks (17 in 11 innings pitched), and was released on May 10.

=== Somerset Patriots ===
On May 31, 2013, Hinshaw signed with the Somerset Patriots of the Atlantic League of Professional Baseball, He released on June 13. In 2 games 1 inning of relief he gave up 1 hit and 1 earned run (9.00 ERA) with 4 walks and 2 strikeouts.

=== Bridgeport Bluefish ===
On June 22, 2013, Hinshaw signed with the Bridgeport Bluefish of the Atlantic League of Professional Baseball. He was released on July 27. In 9 games 8.2 innings of relief he struggled immensely going 0-1 with a 10.38 ERA with 13 strikeouts.

=== Long Island Ducks ===
On August 26, 2013, Hinshaw signed with the Long Island Ducks of the Atlantic League of Professional Baseball. He was released on September 9. In 2 games 1.1 innings of relief he went 0-0 with a 6.75 ERA with 2 strikeouts.

=== Wichita Wingnuts ===
On May 14, 2014, Hinshaw signed with the Wichita Wingnuts of the American Association of Professional Baseball. In 34 games 30.1 innings of relief he went 2-1 with a 2.08 ERA with 43 strikeouts and 4 saves.

=== Grand Prairie AirHogs ===
On August 12, 2014, Hinshaw was traded to the Grand Prairie AirHogs of the American Association of Professional Baseball. He became a free agent following the season. In 6 games 5.2 innings of relief he went 0-1 with a 1.59 ERA with 13 strikeouts and 1 save.
