= Iván Ochoa =

Iván Ochoa may refer to:

- Iván Ochoa (baseball) (born 1982), Venezuelan baseball player
- Iván Ochoa (footballer) (born 1996), Mexican footballer
