= Osiris Matos =

Dominican baseball player (born 1984)

- Relief pitcher
- Born: November 6, 1984 (age 41); Santo Domingo, Dominican Republic
- Batted: Right Threw: Right

MLB debut
- July 3, 2008, for the San Francisco Giants

Last MLB appearance
- May 11, 2009, for the San Francisco Giants

MLB statistics
- Win–loss record: 1–2
- Earned run average: 5.74
- Strikeouts: 21
- Stats at Baseball Reference

Teams
- San Francisco Giants (2008–2009)

Osiris G. Matos Jimenez (born November 6, 1984) is a Dominican former right-handed Major League Baseball relief pitcher.

== Professional career ==
=== San Francisco Giants ===
==== Minor leagues ====
Matos was originally signed by the San Francisco Giants as an international free agent in 2002, and started his professional career off with the rookie-level Arizona League Giants. In 13 starts for the team in 2003, he went 2–2 with a 4.67 ERA and 51 strikeouts in nine games, six of which he started.

2004 was an improvement for Matos; in 11 games (eight starts) with the AZL Giants, he went 2–0 with a 2.44 ERA and 47 strikeouts over 48 innings of work.

In 2005, Matos pitched for the Single-A Augusta GreenJackets. In 29 games (22 of which he started), he posted an 8–8 record with a 4.99 ERA. and 79 strikeouts across 135 1/3 innings of work.

In 2006, Matos split time between the GreenJackets and the Double-A Connecticut Defenders, with whom he performed extremely well - especially with the GreenJackets. He was used entirely as a reliever, appeared in 44 games for the GreenJackets, and logging 13 saves, 81 strikeouts, and a 1.77 ERA in 61 innings of work. Matos then went on to pitch in six games for the Defenders, posting a 3.72 ERA with two additional saves. Overall, he had a 1.91 ERA in 2006, saving 15 games and striking out 86 batters in 70 2/3 innings of work.

In 2007, Matos was again used entirely out of the bullpen and again performed well. He split year between both the GreenJackets (seven scoreless appearances) and Defenders (35 appearances). In his 42 appearances split between the two affiliates, Matos compiled an aggregate 5–0 record and 2.49 ERA with 52 strikeouts and eight saves across 65 innings pitched.

Through 2007 in the minor leagues, Matos posted a 24–13 record with a 3.57 ERA with 24 saves, 23 of which he collected from 2006 to 2007. He began the 2008 season back with Double-A Connecticut.

==== Major leagues ====
On July 2, 2008, Matos was selected to the 40-man roster and promoted to the major leagues for the first time. The next day, Matos made his major league debut against the Chicago Cubs, pitching the ninth inning in a non-save situation, in which he struck out one, and didn't allow a baserunner. He made 20 appearances for San Francisco during his rookie campaign, compiling a 1–2 record and 4.79 ERA with 16 strikeouts across 20 2/3 innings pitched.

Matos was optioned to the Triple-A Fresno Grizzlies to begin the 2009 season. He made five appearances for the Giants, but struggled to a 9.00 ERA with five strikeouts over six innings of work. Matos was designated for assignment by the Giants following the promotion of Madison Bumgarner on September 8. He cleared waivers and was sent outright to Triple-A Fresno on September 16. In 45 total appearances for the Grizzlies over the course of the year, Matos posted a 3–3 record and 3.48 ERA with 48 strikeouts and two saves across 54 1/3 innings pitched. He elected free agency following the season on November 9.

On January 10, 2010, Matos re-signed with the Giants organization on a minor league contract. He spent the year with Triple-A Fresno, registering a 1–4 record and 5.29 ERA with 39 strikeouts and three saves in 51 innings pitched across 38 appearances. Matos elected free agency following the season on November 6.

On January 13, 2011, Matos again re-signed with San Francisco on a new minor league contract. He split the year between the AZL Giants, High-A San Jose Giants, Double-A Richmond Flying Squirrels, and Fresno. In 34 relief appearances for the four affiliates, Matos accumulated a combined 3–4 record and 2.70 ERA with 37 strikeouts and one saves across 53 1/3 innings pitched. Matos elected free agency following the season on November 2.

=== Sultanes de Monterrey ===
On March 4, 2012, Matos signed with the Sultanes de Monterrey of the Mexican League. In 26 appearances for Monterrey, Matos logged a 2–1 record and 2.36 ERA with 19 strikeouts and nine saves across 26 2/3 innings pitched.

=== Vaqueros Laguna ===
On June 17, 2012, Matos signed with the Vaqueros Laguna of the Mexican League. In 19 appearances for the Vaqueros, he posted a 4–0 record and 2.05 ERA with 20 strikeouts and six saves over 22 innings of work.

Matos made 18 appearances for the Vaqueros in 2013, registering a 3–2 record and 5.71 ERA with 17 strikeouts and two saves across 17 1/3 innings pitched. Matos was released by Laguna on May 6, 2013.

=== Piratas de Campeche ===
On February 6, 2015, Matos signed with the Piratas de Campeche of the Mexican League. In nine appearances for the Pirates, he logged a 1–1 record and 5.79 ERA with 10 strikeouts across 9 1/3 innings pitched. Matos was released by Campeche on May 8.

=== Broncos de Reynosa ===
On May 9, 2015, Matos signed with the Broncos de Reynosa of the Mexican League. In four appearances for the team, he pitched to an 0–1 record and 5.40 ERA with two strikeouts across 3 1/3 innings pitched. Matos was released by the Broncos on June 1.

== Coaching career ==
Matos joined the San Francisco Giants organization as a pitching coach for the Dominican Summer League Giants in 2017. He has reprised the role every year through the 2025 season.
