= Billy Sadler =

American baseball player (born 1981)

- Pitcher
- Born: September 21, 1981 (age 44); Pensacola, Florida, U.S.
- Batted: Right Threw: Right

MLB debut
- September 15, 2006, for the San Francisco Giants

Last appearance
- September 10, 2009, for the Houston Astros

MLB statistics
- Win–loss record: 0–1
- Earned run average: 4.53
- Strikeouts: 50
- Stats at Baseball Reference

Teams
- San Francisco Giants (2006, 2008); Houston Astros (2009)

William Henry Sadler IV (born September 21, 1981) is an American former right-handed relief pitcher. He is a 2000 graduate of Pensacola (Florida) Catholic High School and was named Florida Class 3A Player of the Year his senior year He attended Pensacola Junior College in 2001 and 2002 and transferred to Louisiana State University in 2003. He led LSU with four saves, but took the loss when the Tigers were eliminated from the 2003 College World Series by the University of South Carolina.

== San Francisco Giants ==
Sadler was selected by Seattle in the 37th round (1106th overall pick) of the 2000 amateur draft and in the 30th round (909th overall pick) of the 2001 draft, but opted not to sign with the Mariners. He signed with the Giants after they made him their sixth round selection (183rd overall pick) in the 2003 draft.

In his first four seasons in the Giants minor league system, Sadler played for the Hagerstown Suns of the Single-A South Atlantic League (2003); the San Jose Giants of the advanced Single-A California League (2004); the Norwich Navigators (2004–2005) and the Connecticut Defenders (2006) of the Double-A Eastern League; and the Fresno Grizzlies of the Triple-A Pacific Coast League (2006). Pitching almost exclusively out of the bullpen, he compiled a 14-13 win–loss record with 27 saves and a 3.06 ERA through the end of the 2006 season. In 2006, he posted 20 saves as the Defenders' closer. Between Connecticut and Fresno, he struck out 78 batters in 54 2/3 innings while holding opponents to a .148 batting average.

Sadler's minor league success in 2006 earned him a spot on the Giants' September expanded roster when Armando Benítez was placed on the 60-day disabled list. He made his major league debut the following night against St. Louis. After surrendering a walk to Scott Spiezio and a 3-run double to Scott Rolen, he settled down to retire the next four consecutive hitters, including his first big-league strike out.

Sadler was with the Giants in spring training in 2007, but struggled with his control and was optioned to Fresno March 18.

He was called up to the majors in 2008 to replace struggling pitcher Brad Hennessey. On August 10, 2009 Sadler was released by the San Francisco Giants.

== Houston Astros ==
On August 18, 2009, Sadler signed a minor league contract with the Houston Astros.
