= Eugenio Vélez =

Dominican baseball player (born 1982)

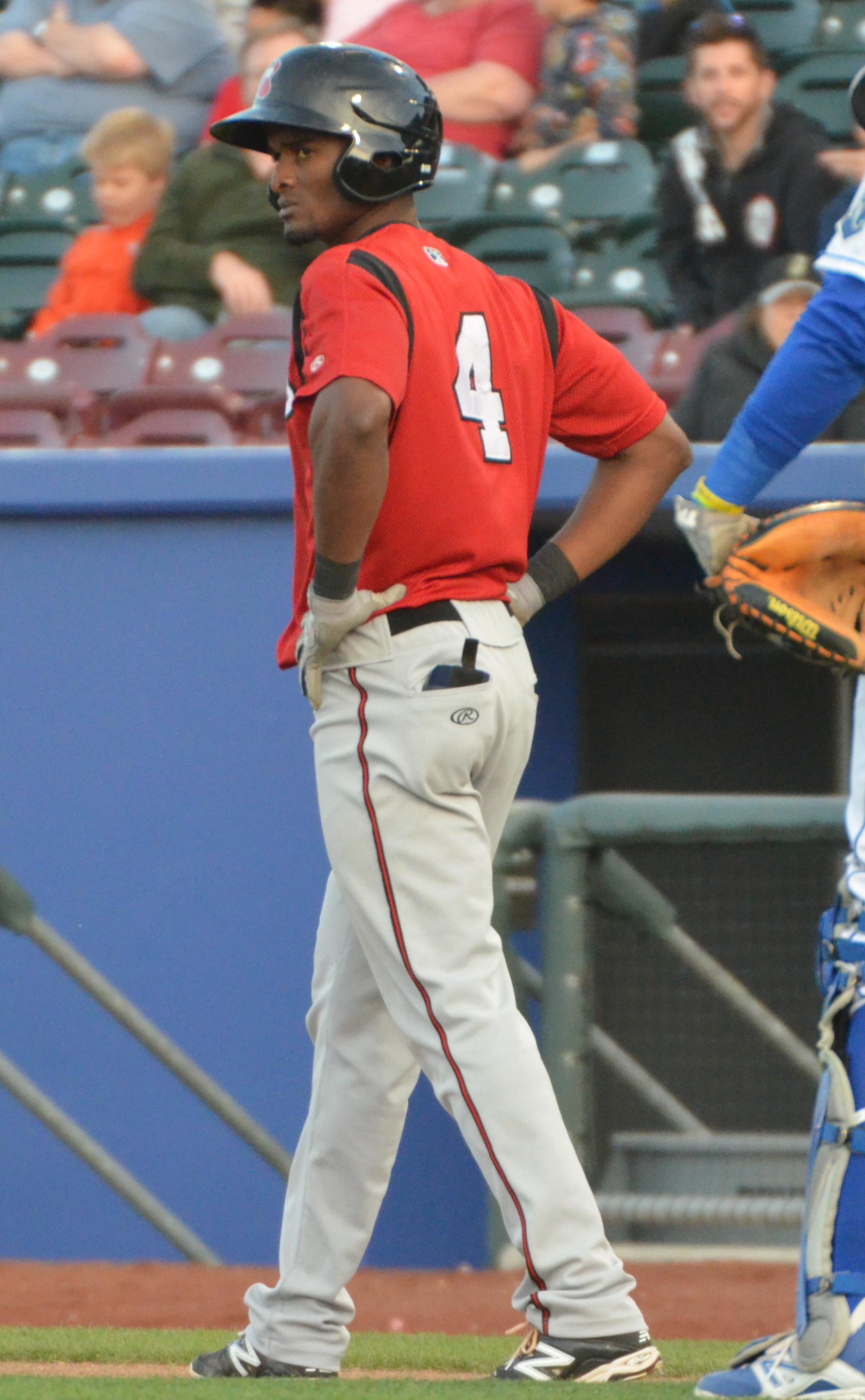
- Vélez with the Nashville Sounds in 2014
- Utility player
- Born: May 16, 1982 (age 44); San Pedro de Macorís, Dominican Republic
- Batted: Switch Threw: Right

MLB debut
- September 5, 2007, for the San Francisco Giants

Last MLB appearance
- September 28, 2011, for the Los Angeles Dodgers

MLB statistics
- Batting average: .241
- Home runs: 8
- Runs batted in: 72
- Stolen bases: 31
- Stats at Baseball Reference

Teams
- San Francisco Giants (2007–2010); Los Angeles Dodgers (2011)

Eugenio Vélez Vancomper (born May 16, 1982) is a Dominican former professional baseball utility player. He played in Major League Baseball (MLB) for the San Francisco Giants and Los Angeles Dodgers from 2007 to 2011.

== Career ==
=== Toronto Blue Jays ===
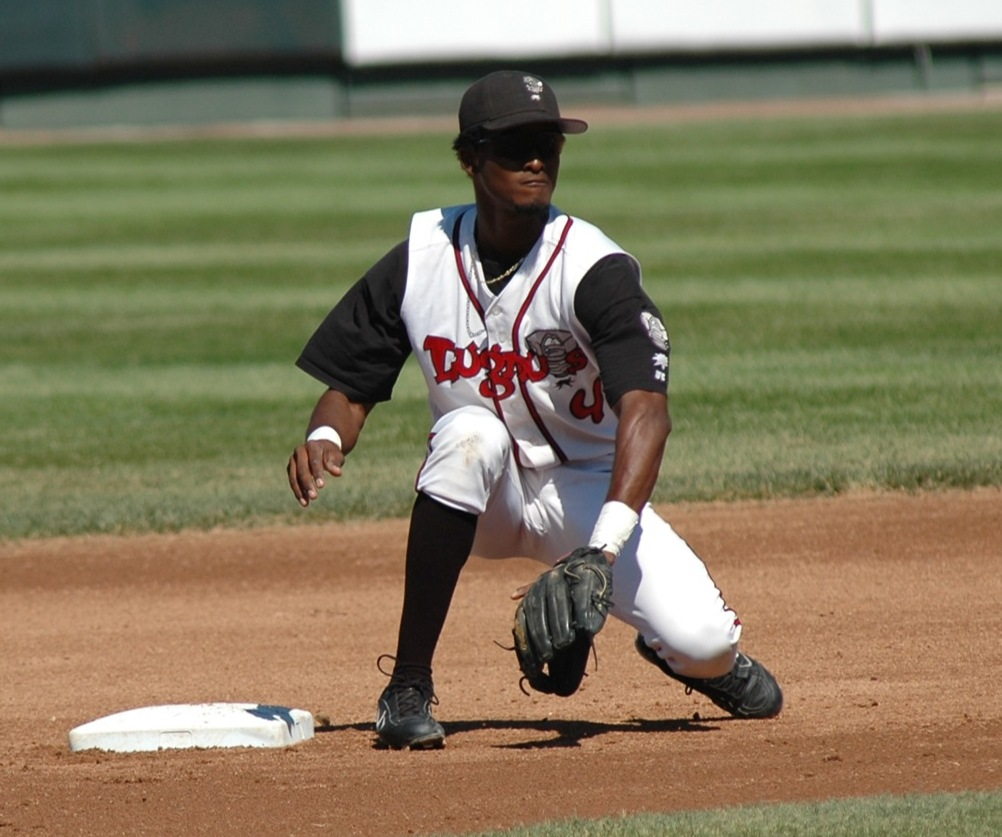
Velez with the Lansing Lugnuts in 2005

Vélez's career began when the Toronto Blue Jays signed him on August 27, 2001. He had to beg his mother, who wanted him to be an engineer, to sign for him (because he was only 19), but she reluctantly did. He began his professional career with the Pulaski Blue Jays in 2003. After three solid years in the minors, he was selected by the San Francisco Giants from the Toronto Blue Jays in the 2005 minor league Rule 5 draft.

=== San Francisco Giants ===
In 2006, the Giants assigned Vélez to the Class A Augusta GreenJackets. He had an exceptional year, winning the South Atlantic League's Most Valuable Player award. He won the award by batting .315 with 63 extra base hits, 64 stolen bases and organization-high 91 runs batted in. The following year, he was placed on the Giants' 40-man roster. He started the year with the AA Connecticut Defenders, but he played so well he earned a promotion to the AAA Fresno Grizzlies. However, he only played four games with Fresno before the Giants called him up for the first time. He made his debut on September 5, as a pinch hitter, as the Giants beat the Colorado Rockies 5–3. He finished the year with four stolen bases, although he only had three hits in 11 at-bats (in addition to two walks).

In 2008, Vélez made the Giants out of spring training, but he was sent down to the Grizzlies in May for Travis Denker. After playing well at Fresno, though, he was recalled on July 8, 2008. On August 30, 2008, he hit his first career home run against the Cincinnati Reds. In 2009, Vélez once again made the Giants out of spring training. He would play in both San Francisco and Fresno during the year, but he spent the majority of time with the Giants. He finished the year with an acceptable .267 batting average. Vélez made the Opening Day roster in 2010. His first appearance of the season came in the Giants' 10–4 victory to complete a three-game sweep of the Houston Astros at Minute Maid Park on April 7. He entered the contest replacing Mark DeRosa in left field as part of a double switch in the seventh inning. The front of his jersey read "SAN FRANCICSO." It was the second year in a row that Majestic Athletic, MLB's official uniform supplier, committed a jersey misspelling.

Vélez' poor play during the start of the 2010 season led to his removal from the Giants active roster when the Giants acquired Pat Burrell. He was called up at times during the later part of the 2010 season. On July 26, while sitting in the dugout during a Giants' 10–4 win over the Arizona Diamondbacks, Vélez was struck in the head by a foul ball, coincidentally off the bat of Burrell, and hospitalized briefly afterward. He was placed on the disabled list for a short time after that, but was eventually pronounced fine. However, coincidentally or not, once Vélez returned to action in August, he would go hitless (in nine at-bats) for the rest of the season, and then 0-for-37 the following season with the Los Angeles Dodgers (although he would hit well over .300 in minor league action in 2011).

=== Los Angeles Dodgers ===
On December 13, 2010, he signed a minor league contract with an invite to spring training with the Los Angeles Dodgers. He joined the AAA Albuquerque Isotopes. He hit .339 in 55 games with the Isotopes and on July 4, 2011, he was called up to the Dodgers. On August 22, Vélez tied J. D. Drew for the worst offensive start for the Dodgers since 1919 by failing to get a hit in his first 25 at-bats. On September 23, he struck out three times to break a 75-year-old record for most at-bats in a season without a hit (36) and tie a 102-year-old record for most consecutive at-bats without a hit spanning more than one season (45).

In the last game of the season, Vélez grounded out as a pinch hitter in the eighth inning, finishing the year 0-for-37, the most at-bats in a season without a hit by a position player in Major League history. He also extended his overall hitless streak to 46 at-bats, breaking the record previously shared by Bill Bergen, Dave Campbell and Craig Counsell. On April 8, 2019, Chris Davis of the Baltimore Orioles broke the record when he recorded his 47th consecutive at-bat without a hit.

On October 4, the Dodgers outrighted Vélez to AAA, removing him from the 40-man roster.

=== St. Louis Cardinals ===
On December 21, 2011, Vélez signed a minor league contract with the St. Louis Cardinals.

=== Toronto Blue Jays (second stint) ===
Vélez returned to the Blue Jays organization in December 2012 by signing a minor league contract, with a spring training invitation. He started the 2013 season on the roster of the Triple-A Buffalo Bisons. He was released on July 22.

=== Milwaukee Brewers ===
Vélez signed a minor league contract with the Milwaukee Brewers on July 26, 2013, and was assigned to the Triple-A Nashville Sounds.

=== Tampa Bay Rays ===
On December 12, 2014, Vélez signed a minor league contract with the Tampa Bay Rays. In 56 games for the Triple–A Durham Bulls, he slashed .272/.336/.371 with two home runs, 22 RBI, and 15 stolen bases. Vélez was released by the Rays organization on June 26, 2015.

=== Tigres de Quintana Roo ===
On July 10, 2015, Vélez signed with the Tigres de Quintana Roo of the Mexican League. In 31 games he hit .318/.370/.389 with 1 home run, 14 RBIs and 12 stolen bases.

In 2016, Vélez returned for a second consecutive season with Quintana. In 24 games he struggled hitting .223/.315/.309 with 1 home run, 12 RBIs and 2 stolen bases.

=== Acereros de Monclova ===
On June 17, 2016, Vélez was traded to the Acereros de Monclova of the Mexican League. In 50 games he hit .310/.374/.411 with 3 home runs, 20 RBIs and 12 stolen bases.

=== Tigres de Quintana Roo ===
On March 30, 2017, Vélez was traded back to the Tigres de Quintana Roo of the Mexican League. He was released on April 20. In 16 games he struggled mightily hitting .177/.221/.307 with 2 home runs, 11 RBIs and 2 stolen bases.

== Criminal sentence ==
Vélez and his brother, Algenis, were arrested in March 2020 with several weapons. In December 2022, the First Collegiate Court of Santo Domingo Province sentenced Vélez and his brother to prison for 10 years for arms trafficking.

The court ruled under the legal classification of association of criminals, carrying, illegal possession of a firearm. Both were sent to the San Pedro de Macorís Correction and Rehabilitation Center.

At the moment of his arrest, he was aboard a Mercedes-Benz where the authorities seized several illegal weapons. The Dominican National Police seized a 5.6-millimeter caliber rifle, M15, two chargers, and 34 capsules.

Then, the Public Prosecutor's Office searched the home of Vélez and his brother, where they found a Walther brand pistol, model P22, 22 mm caliber, with its charger and six capsules, all of them illegal.

Vélez and his brother were accused of belonging to a criminal network that was dedicated to illegally buying, trading and distributing firearms in the territory of the Dominican Republic.

== See also ==
- Rule 5 draft results
