= Keiichi Yabu =

Japanese baseball player and coach (born 1968)

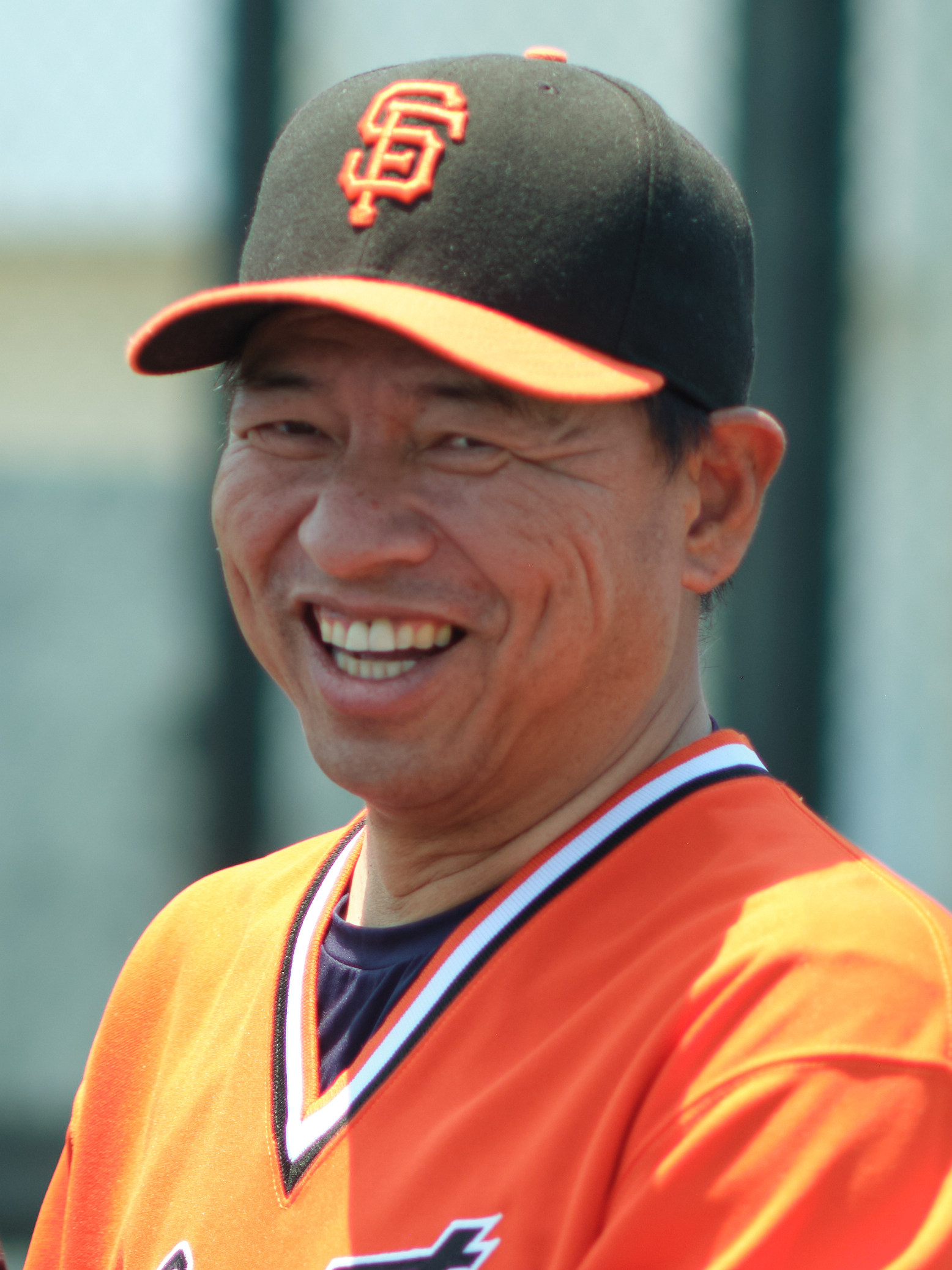
- Yabu in 2025
- Pitcher / Coach
- Born: September 28, 1968 (age 57); Mihama, Mie, Japan
- Batted: Right Threw: Right

Professional debut
- NPB: April 13, 1994, for the Hanshin Tigers
- MLB: April 9, 2005, for the Oakland Athletics

Last appearance
- MLB: September 27, 2008, for the San Francisco Giants
- NPB: September 4, 2010, for the Tohoku Rakuten Golden Eagles

NPB statistics
- Win–loss record: 84–106
- Earned run average: 3.58
- Strikeouts: 1,035

MLB statistics
- Win–loss record: 7-6
- Earned run average: 4.00
- Strikeouts: 92
- Stats at Baseball Reference

Teams
- As player: Hanshin Tigers (1994–2004); Oakland Athletics (2005); San Francisco Giants (2008); Tohoku Rakuten Golden Eagles (2010); As coach: Hanshin Tigers (2011–2013)

Career highlights and awards
- NPB Central League Rookie of the Year (1994)

Keiichi Yabu (藪 恵壹, Yabu Keiichi; real name: 藪 恵一) (born September 28, 1968) is a Japanese baseball pitching coach for the Hanshin Tigers and a former baseball pitcher. He played eleven seasons in Japan, and parts of two seasons in Major League Baseball for the Oakland Athletics in 2005 and the San Francisco Giants in 2008.

== Career ==
Prior to his MLB career, Yabu pitched for the Hanshin Tigers of Nippon Professional Baseball from 1994 to 2004. During that time, he had a combined record of 84 wins and 106 losses in 268 games with 206 starts. He completed 39 complete games and had a career 3.57 ERA.

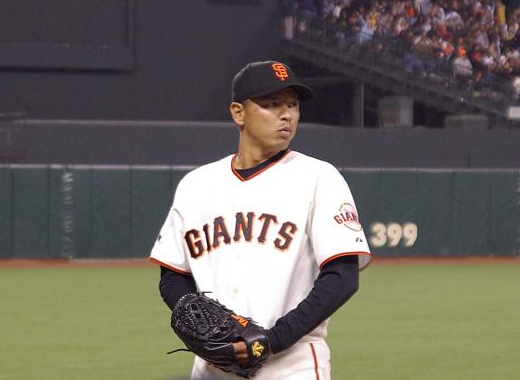
Yabu with San Francisco in 2008

In 2005 with the Athletics, Yabu pitched 58 innings in 40 games with 4 wins and 0 losses. He had an ERA of 4.50 and allowed 34 runs while striking out 44.

Yabu asked for and was granted his release by the Rockies prior to the start of the 2006 season after he did not make the Rockies' major league roster. He pitched briefly in the Mexican League with the Potros de Tijuana, then sat out the 2007 season. Yabu signed a minor league contract with an invitation to spring training with the San Francisco Giants in December 2007, and made the 2008 Opening Day roster.

Prior to the 2009 season, he was released by the Giants. However, he re-signed with the organization to a minor league contract. Later that July, he was released from the Giants system. During his year with the Giants, he had an ERA of 3.57, allowed 33 runs, and struck out 48, in 68 innings pitched throughout 60 games, with a win–loss record of 3-6 for the season.

Yabu did not appear in another MLB game after being released from the Giants. Returning to NPB, he pitched for the Tohoku Rakuten Golden Eagles. He retired from professional baseball upon the conclusion of the 2010 season.

=== Triple play ===
On May 30, 2008, Yabu entered a game against the San Diego Padres as a reliever for the Giants with the score tied and with runners at first and second base, with nobody out. He threw one pitch, and Kevin Kouzmanoff grounded into a triple play. He continued to pitch 2 additional hitless innings that game.

== See also ==
- Nippon Professional Baseball Rookie of the Year Award
