= Brad Hennessey =

American baseball player (born 1980)

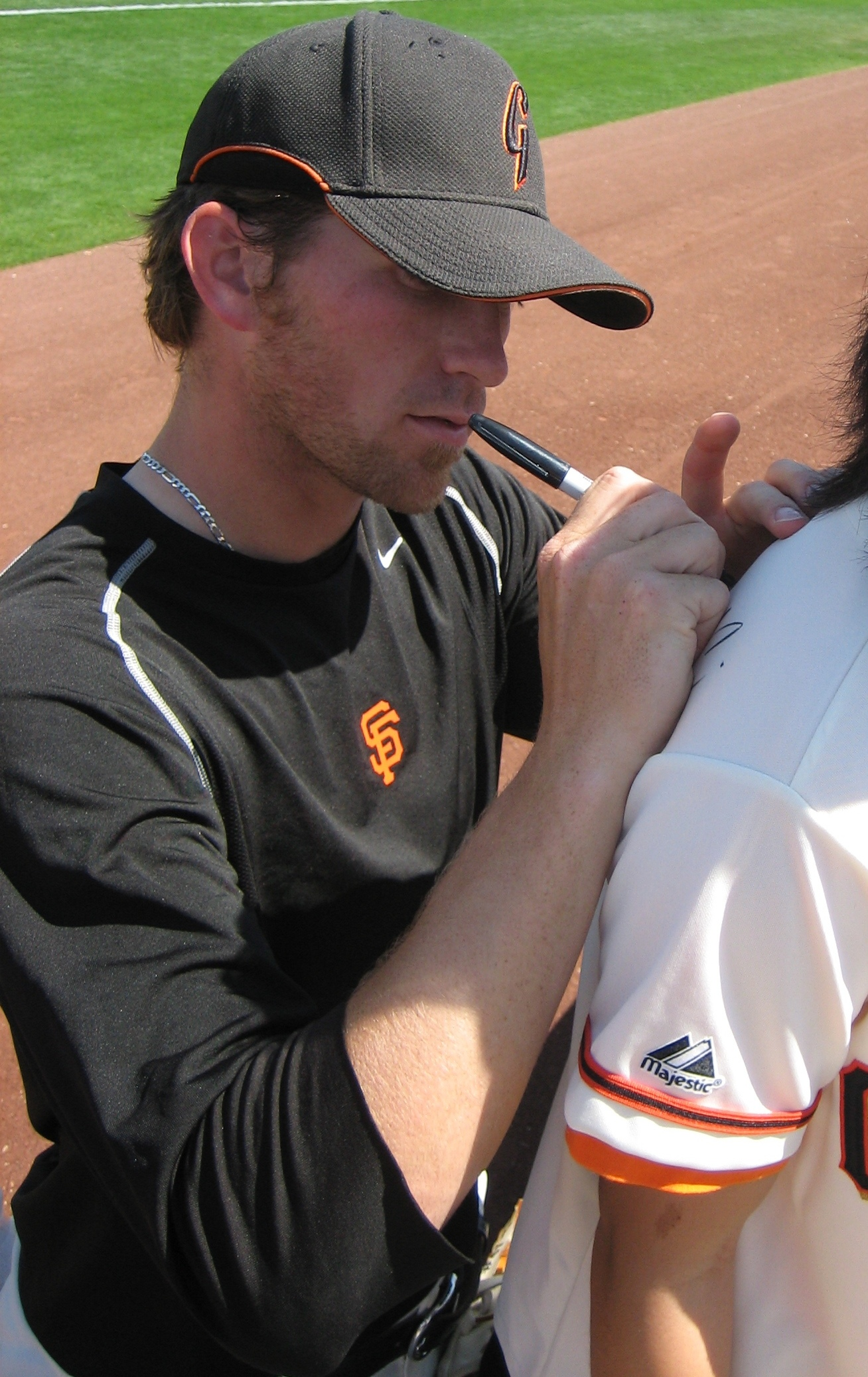
- Hennessey with the San Francisco Giants
- Pitcher
- Born: February 7, 1980 (age 46); Toledo, Ohio, U.S.
- Batted: Right Threw: Right

MLB debut
- August 7, 2004, for the San Francisco Giants

Last MLB appearance
- September 26, 2008, for the San Francisco Giants

MLB statistics
- Win–loss record: 17–23
- Earned run average: 4.69
- Strikeouts: 192
- Stats at Baseball Reference

Teams
- San Francisco Giants (2004–2008)

Brad Martin Hennessey (born February 7, 1980) is an American former professional baseball pitcher. He played in Major League Baseball (MLB) for the San Francisco Giants. He stands 6 feet 2 inches (1.88 m) tall and weighs 185 pounds (84 kg). He played for the Giants from 2004 to 2008 and threw five pitches: a fastball, a slider, a changeup, a curveball, and a cutter.

Hennessey attended Youngstown State University and set several school records during his tenure with the team. In 2001, he was selected by the Giants in the first round of the draft. He did not pitch in 2002 because of surgery to remove a non-cancerous tumor from his back. In 2004, he reached the major leagues for the first time. He spent much of the 2005 season in the major leagues, making 21 starts and posting a 4.64 earned run average (ERA). In 2006, Hennessey spent time both in the Giants' starting rotation and the bullpen. He became a relief pitcher full-time in 2007, spending the entire season in the majors and closing for the Giants part of the time. After posting a 7.81 ERA with the Giants in 2008, Hennessey was outrighted to the minors; he refused the assignment and became a free agent. He attempted to pitch for the Baltimore Orioles in 2009 but was unable due to injury. Hennessey then spent parts of 2010 and 2011 in the minor leagues.

== Early life ==
Hennessey was born on February 7, 1980, in Toledo, Ohio. In 1997, he graduated from Whitmer High School, where he was named a USA Today honorable mention All-American and won All-Ohio honors for his baseball playing. He went to Youngstown State University, where he played shortstop and pitched until his senior year, when he converted exclusively to pitching. As a senior, he had a 6–5 record and a 4.06 earned run average (ERA) in 16 games while setting school single-season records for innings pitched (88 2/3) and strikeouts (126). That year, he was named the Mid-Continent Conference co-Pitcher of the Year.

== Professional career ==
=== Minor leagues (part 1) ===
Hennessey was drafted by the San Francisco Giants in the first round (21st overall) of the 2001 Major League Baseball draft. He began his career with the Salem-Keizer Volcanoes of the Single-A short season Northwest League, where he had a 1–0 record, a 2.38 ERA, 22 strikeouts, and 34 innings pitched in nine starts. That year, Salem-Keizer won the Northwest League championship. While pitching in an instructional league later that year, Hennessey began experiencing soreness that was initially attributed to a muscle strain but turned out to be a non-cancerous tumor in his back. He had it removed in February 2002, but it grew back later that season, and he missed the entire year while undergoing a second surgery.

Hennessey began 2003 in extended spring training but pitched for the Hagerstown Suns of the Single-A South Atlantic League from June 14 to the end of the season. With Hagerstown, Hennessey had a 3–9 record, a 4.21 ERA, 44 strikeouts, one complete game, and 79 1/3 innings pitched in 15 starts. He began the 2004 season with the Norwich Navigators of the Double-A Eastern League, where he had a 5–5 record, a 3.56 ERA, 55 strikeouts, and 101 innings pitched in 18 starts. On July 14, he was promoted to the Fresno Grizzlies of the Triple-A Pacific Coast League. In 5 starts with Fresno, he had a 4–1 record, a 2.02 ERA, 16 strikeouts, and 35 2/3 innings pitched.

=== Major leagues ===
==== 2004 ====
Following an injury to Jerome Williams in 2004, Hennessey was called up to join the Giants' starting rotation. He made his debut on August 7 against Greg Maddux of the Chicago Cubs, who was looking for his 300th win. Hennessey allowed four runs in 4 2/3 innings and took the loss in the 8–4 defeat, becoming the first pitcher to lose his debut to a pitcher who won his 300th game since 1901, when Cy Young defeated John McPherson. In his next start, against the Philadelphia Phillies on August 13, he allowed four unearned runs in five innings, got his first career hit (against Brian Powell), and earned his first career win in a 16–6 victory. After another start, he was sent to Fresno on August 18 when Wayne Franklin returned from the disabled list, but he was called up on August 28 when David Aardsma was demoted. On September 16, he threw a season-high seven shutout innings in a 4–0 victory over the Milwaukee Brewers. Hennessey finished the season with a 2–2 record, a 4.98 ERA, 25 strikeouts, and 34 1/3 innings pitched in seven starts.

==== 2005 ====
Hennessey began 2005 in the minors. He was called up to make a start on May 1, and he gave up three runs over seven innings while earning the win in an 8–3 victory over the Pittsburgh Pirates. After the game, he was returned to Fresno to make room for Jeremy Accardo on the roster, but he was called up on May 12 to replace the injured Jason Schmidt in the rotation. He made four starts on this stint; after he gave up six runs in two innings in a 6–5 loss to the Phillies on June 2, he was replaced in the rotation by Jeff Fassero and returned to Fresno. On July 9, he was called up to rejoin the Giants' rotation as Kirk Rueter was demoted to the bullpen. Facing the St. Louis Cardinals that day, he pitched seven shutout innings and earned the win in the Giants' 2–0 victory. For the rest of the year, he remained in the Giants' rotation. In a start against the Brewers on July 28, Hennessey pitched 7 shutout innings, striking out seven and allowing only three hits, and won the game 3–0. The three runs came on a home run by Hennessey himself against Víctor Santos. He allowed one run over a career-high 7 2/3 innings on September 21 and hit a home run against John Patterson as he defeated the Washington Nationals 5–1. He ended up making 21 starts for the Giants, tallying a 5–8 record, a 4.64 ERA, 64 strikeouts, and 52 walks in 118 1/3 innings pitched. With Fresno, he had a 4–2 record, a 5.19 ERA, 46 strikeouts, 22 walks, and 67 2/3 innings pitched.

==== 2006 ====
Kevin Correia and the newly acquired Jamey Wright competed for the Giants' fifth starting job with Hennessey in 2006; Hennessey struggled and began the season with the Grizzlies as Wright won the job. Hennessey was called up on April 16 due to an injury to Noah Lowry. After posting a 2–1 record and a 3.33 ERA, he was sent to the bullpen upon Lowry's return to the starting rotation on May 9, though Hennessey was frequently called upon to make spot starts. He got his first career save on June 5, pitching the final four innings of the Giants' 14–2 victory over the Florida Marlins. On August 11, Giants' manager Felipe Alou announced that Hennessey would replace the struggling Wright in the rotation. In his first start since rejoining the rotation on August 14, he threw 5 2/3 shutout innings, earning the win in a 1–0 victory over the San Diego Padres. He posted an 8.62 ERA over his next four starts and returned to the bullpen when Lowry returned from an injury in September, though he made one more start before the end of the year. In 34 games (12 starts), Hennessey had a 5–6 record, a 4.26 ERA, 42 strikeouts, and 42 walks in 99 1/3 innings pitched.

==== 2007 ====
Hennessey spent the entire 2007 season in the bullpen for the Giants. At the beginning of June, he was named the closer by Giants' manager Bruce Bochy after Armando Benítez was traded. From June 30 to August 31, he converted saves in 14 straight save opportunities, the longest streak by a Giant since Robb Nen had a 28-save streak in 2000; overall, Hennessey converted 17 out of 19 saves from May 30 to August 31. Afterwards, he converted only two out of five opportunities before Brian Wilson took over the closer role. In 2007, he went 4–5 and had a 3.42 ERA and 19 saves (out of 24 opportunities).

==== 2008 ====
On January 18, 2008, the Giants and Hennessey avoided arbitration and agreed to a $1.6 million, one-year deal. After he posted a 12.94 in his first 11 games of the season, he got sent down to the minors on May 6 to make room for Billy Sadler. Used as a starter at Fresno, Hennessey posted a 7–10 record, a 4.83 ERA, 69 strikeouts, 37 walks, and 132 1/3 innings pitched in 21 starts. He was called back up when rosters expanded on September 1. After initially pitching out of the bullpen, he was moved to the rotation to replace Correia. On September 15, he threw the only complete game of his career, allowing three runs in eight innings in a 3–1 loss to the Arizona Diamondbacks at Chase Field. In 17 games (four starts), he had a 1–2 record, a 7.81 ERA, 21 strikeouts, and 15 walks in 40 1/3 innings pitched. He was outrighted to the minors in October, but he refused the assignment and became a free agent.

=== Minor leagues (part 2) ===
Hennessey signed a minor league deal with the Baltimore Orioles on November 17, 2008. Spencer Fordin of MLB.com wrote that Hennessey was "consistently hyped as a favorite to break camp in the rotation" for the Orioles. However, an elbow injury kept Hennessey from making any appearances with the Orioles or their affiliates. On June 1, 2009, Hennessey was released.

On March 2, 2010, Hennessey signed with the Minnesota Twins. He spent the 2010 season with the Rochester Red Wings of the Triple-A International League, posting a 1–3 record, a 7.76 ERA, 13 strikeouts, and eight walks in 26 2/3 innings. After 14 games (one start), Hennessey was released on August 5.

The Houston Astros signed Hennessey to a minor league contract on May 31, 2011. He played for the Double-A Corpus Christi Hooks of the Texas League and the Triple-A Oklahoma City RedHawks of the Pacific Coast League. His four games with Corpus Christi were all relief appearances; he had an 0–1 record and a 1.80 ERA. In seven games (six starts) with Oklahoma City, he had an 0–3 record, an 11.45 ERA, 10 strikeouts, and five walks in 22 innings pitched. On August 1, Hennessey was released by the Astros.

== Pitching Style ==
Hennessey threw five pitches: a fastball, a slider, a changeup, a curveball, and a cutter. The fastball was Hennessey's main pitch; he threw it over 60% of the time in the majors. He did not throw it very hard, averaging speeds under 90 mph in 2007 and 2008. His slider was his secondary pitch, and his changeup was his third most-used pitch. Hennessey rarely used the cutter except for in 2006, when he threw it 10.1% of the time. Henessey often was plagued by a big inning, displaying a tendency to allow several runs in an inning during his starts.

== Personal life ==
Hennessey married a nurse, Erin Bullard, on December 14, 2002. The couple has two children: Emma (born April 18, 2003) and Colin Jacob (born October 26, 2006). Hennessey participated in numerous charitable events during his tenure with the Giants.
