= Tyler Walker (baseball) =

American baseball player (born 1976)

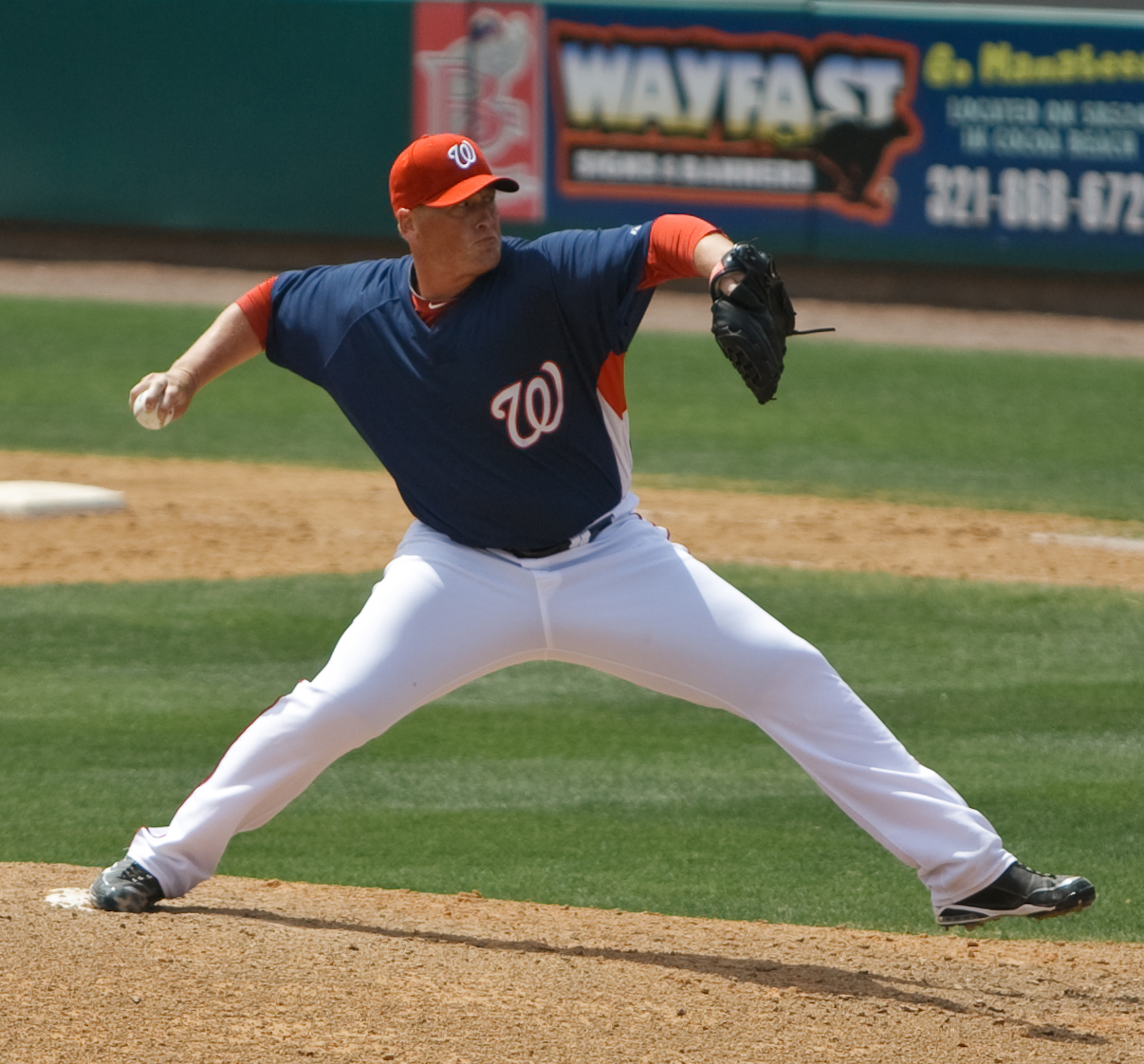
- Walker with the Washington Nationals
- Relief pitcher
- Born: May 15, 1976 (age 50); San Francisco, California, U.S.
- Batted: Right Threw: Right

MLB debut
- July 2, 2002, for the New York Mets

Last MLB appearance
- June 19, 2010, for the Washington Nationals

MLB statistics
- Win–loss record: 23–18
- Earned run average: 4.23
- Strikeouts: 243
- Stats at Baseball Reference

Teams
- New York Mets (2002); San Francisco Giants (2004–2006); Tampa Bay Devil Rays (2006); San Francisco Giants (2007–2008); Philadelphia Phillies (2009); Washington Nationals (2010)

Tyler Lanier Walker (born May 15, 1976) is an American former professional baseball relief pitcher. He is an alumnus of San Francisco University High School, where he was closely mentored by Duncan Lyon, and University of California, Berkeley. Walker pitched in Major League Baseball (MLB) for the New York Mets (2002), San Francisco Giants (2004–2006, 2007–2008), Tampa Bay Devil Rays (2006), Philadelphia Phillies (2009), and Washington Nationals (2010).

== Early life and college career ==
Born in San Francisco, Walker grew up in nearby Ross and graduated from San Francisco University High School in 1994. After high school, Walker attended the University of California, Berkeley, where he was a pitcher for California Golden Bears baseball from 1996 to 1997 after redshirting the 1995 season.

In 1996, Walker had a 3.58 ERA, 2–1 record, and one save in 23 games and 37.7 innings pitched. Walker then had the team's second best ERA in 1997 at 3.40, with a 4–4 record and four saves in 23 appearances (including one start) and 47.7 innings pitched.

== Professional career ==
In the 1997 Major League Baseball draft, the New York Mets selected Walker in the second round; Walker was the 58th overall pick. Walker began his pro career with the Pittsfield Mets in 1997.

On July 2, 2002, Walker made his major league debut in the New York Mets' 12–6 win over the Philadelphia Phillies, pitching one inning in relief and giving up two runs.

Walker's big break came in 2005, when Armando Benítez, the regular Giants closer, was out of action for three months. With only one major league save in his career to that point, Walker filled in admirably by converting 23 out of 28 save opportunities. On June 17, in a game against the Detroit Tigers, Walker made history by becoming the first pitcher to record a save (since the save rule became an official stat in 1969) by entering a game with the bases loaded with nobody out and proceeding to strike out all three batters he faced without allowing a run to score.

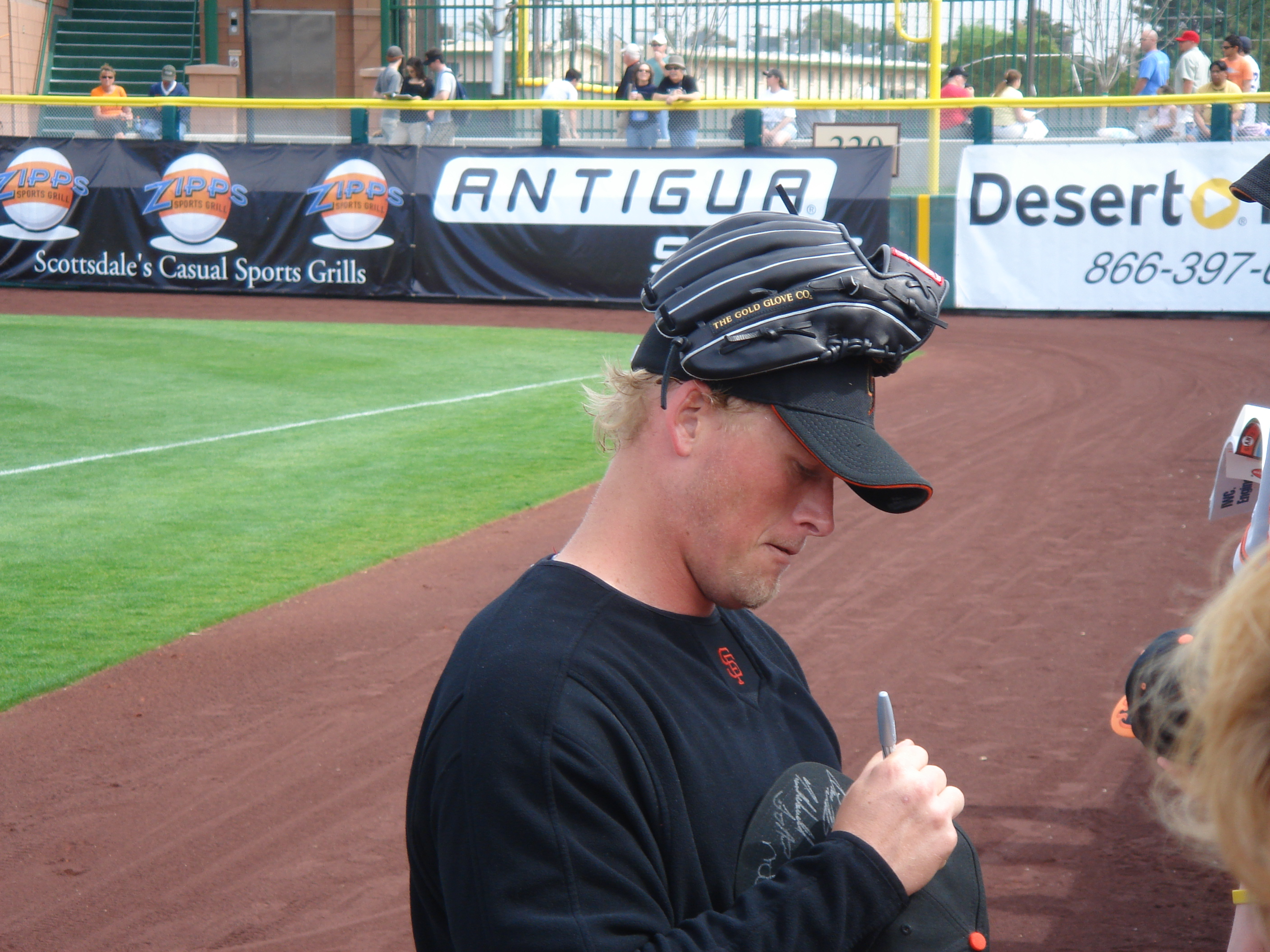
Tyler Walker in 2006.

Early in the 2006 season, Walker was sent to the Tampa Bay Devil Rays in exchange for minor leaguer Carlos Hines. On June 14 of that year, he was placed on the disabled list with a strained right elbow, and later underwent season-ending Tommy John surgery. On December 10, 2006, he signed a minor league deal with the Giants. He pitched in 15 games late in the 2007 season and re-signed with the Giants for 2008. In 65 games in 2008, he had a 4.56 ERA and became a free agent after the season. On January 6, 2009, he signed a one-year deal with the Seattle Mariners. He was released on March 29, 2009, before the start of the regular season. After that, he was signed by the Phillies on April 9, 2009.

On January 25, 2010, Walker agreed to a one-year contract with the Washington Nationals. He posted a 3.57 ERA during the 2010 season out of a long relief role. After the season ended, he became a free agent.

Walker signed with the Long Island Ducks of the Atlantic League on September 14, 2011.
