= Brian Horwitz =

American baseball player (born 1982)

- Outfielder
- Born: November 7, 1982 (age 43); Santa Monica, California, U.S.
- Batted: Right Threw: Right

MLB debut
- May 30, 2008, for the San Francisco Giants

Last MLB appearance
- June 30, 2008, for the San Francisco Giants

MLB statistics
- Batting average: .222
- Home runs: 2
- Runs batted in: 4
- Stats at Baseball Reference

Teams
- San Francisco Giants (2008)
Medals
Men's baseball
Representing United States
World Youth Baseball Championship
Gold medal – first place	1998 Fairview Heights	Team

Brian Jeffery Horwitz, nicknamed "The Rabbi", (born November 7, 1982) is an American former baseball outfielder who played for the San Francisco Giants in 2008, and won two minor league batting titles.

== Baseball career ==
=== High school ===
A native of Santa Monica, California, Horwitz attended Crespi Carmelite High School in Encino, California, where he was Mission League MVP, All-Valley, and first team All-CIF Division I as a senior, batting .415. He helped lead his team to three straight league titles.

=== Summer leagues ===
In the summer of 2001, he played for the Peninsula Oilers in the Alaska Baseball League, and in the summer of 2002 he played for the Hyannis Harbor Hawks, then known as the Hyannis Mets, in the Cape Cod League.

=== College (2001–04) ===
As a freshman right fielder for the University of California at Berkeley Bears, where he majored in American history, in 2001 he batted .310, and had a team-best 11 stolen bases. He had a school record 23-game hitting streak. He had 6 outfield assists on the season. He was an honorable mention Freshman All-American in Collegiate Baseball. As a sophomore in 2002, he hit .266. In 2003 as a junior, he hit .347 with a team-leading 47 RBIs (including a school record 8 on February 14, 2003) and a .405 OBP and a .535 slugging percentage. He batted .400 with runners in scoring position, and was Pac-10 honorable mention and honorable mention Pac-10 All-Academic.

He was drafted in the 26th round by the Oakland Athletics in the June 2003 draft, but did not sign.

As a senior, he dropped down to .288 and though he kept his OBP at .400, he was not drafted. "The two days of the draft were probably the worst two days of my life," he said. "I've kind of been doubted my whole career, and that's fine with me. It fuels the fire."

He had all the forms ready for chiropractic school, but he wanted the experience of playing pro ball for a half-summer, so he took the San Francisco Giants' offer of a uniform and $1,000 and signed as a non-drafted free agent in June of 2004.

=== Minor leagues (2004–10) ===
Horwitz won two titles in two years in the minor leagues. In 2004, Horwitz won the Northwest League batting title with a .347 average, the second-best in team history, playing for the Salem-Keizer Volcanoes in the Northwest League, and had a .407 OBP. He also earned a spot on the league All-Star team, led the league in hits (93), and set a franchise mark with 24 doubles. In 2005, he hit .349 (the 2nd-highest batting average of all minor leaguers with 400 or more at bats) for the Augusta GreenJackets in the South Atlantic League, and won his second consecutive batting title, while sporting a .415 OBP. He had 50 walks, while striking out only 39 times in 470 at-bats, and also led the league with 38 doubles. In addition, he had 8 outfield assists. He was also MVP of the 2005 California League Championship Series. Baseball America dubbed him the player with the best strike-zone discipline in the Giants' organization. In 2006, he spent nearly half the season at San Jose of the California League, where he hit .324 with a .414 OBP. He spent most of the rest of the season with the Double-A Connecticut Defenders, where he hit .286 with a .365 OBP, and ended the season with a handful of at-bats with the Triple-A Fresno Grizzlies.

In 2007, he was a non-roster invitee to the Giants' spring training, but the Giants ultimately assigned him to the Connecticut Defenders. In 35 games for the team, he hit .309 with a .371 on-base percentage. In late May, he was promoted to the Triple-A Fresno Grizzlies. He hit .326 for the Grizzlies with a .383 on-base percentage in 84 games.

The 2008 Baseball Prospect Handbook said:

all he does is spray hits wherever he plays. He won batting titles in his first two seasons, and didn't slow down once he hit Triple-A Fresno last year, hitting .326 after a mid-season promotion. Every manager for whom he has played has become his biggest fan. Horwitz has a great two-strike approach, loves the opposite field, and doesn't strike out, despite a swing that can get a bit long and choppy. He ... is better suited defensively for left field... it's hard to find a more dedicated worker.

Horwitz started 2008 with Fresno, and was hitting .294 with a .351 OBP in 44 games when he was called up to the major leagues. In 2009 with Fresno he batted .291 with 10 doubles, 4 home runs, and 26 RBIs in 76 games before his season was cut short with a left rib cage muscle strain.

In his minor league career through 2009, Horwitz had a .316 batting average, .387 OBP, and in 2,104 at-bats had 130 doubles, 279 RBIs, 223 walks, and 243 strikeouts.

In the December 2009 Triple-A phase of the Rule 5 draft, the Giants lost Horwitz, who was claimed by the Cleveland Indians with the fourth pick of the draft. "This is good for him. I'm happy for him," Giants vice president of player personnel Dick Tidrow said. "He's a good kid. He's a good hitter and needs a change of scenery. He did good things for us and himself. Now he's reborn. He can go over there, show his stuff and maybe get back to the big leagues." "He's a right-handed-hitting corner outfielder, something we have a need for, obviously," John Mirabelli, the Indians' assistant general manager in charge of scouting said. "He can handle the bat. He did pretty well in a small sample in the big leagues. He'll go to Columbus and give us some depth where we need it."

In 2010, Horwitz played in spring training with the Indians, and then in six games for Cleveland's AAA team before he was released on April 20.

=== Major leagues (2008) ===
Horwitz was a non-roster invitee to 2008 Giants spring training. In March, the Giants reassigned him to their minor league camp.

On May 30, 2008, the Giants purchased his contract from Triple-A when Dan Ortmeier went on the DL with a broken finger.

Horwitz hit his first major league home run on June 2, 2008, off New York Mets starting pitcher Óliver Pérez. He was mobbed in the dugout afterward. "There was a lot of love in that dugout," Horwitz said. "It adds to the experience. That's a great group of guys here and I just love being a part of this team." "Unbelievable," Horwitz said of his Major League experience. "It’s extraordinary, surreal. It’s an out-of-body experience. I’m really enjoying being here. How could you complain?"

After hitting .304 in his first 21 at-bats, Horwitz went 1-for-15 and was sent down to Fresno for more playing time on July 6, 2008.

=== Awards ===
- 2004 – Northwest League Post-Season All-Star OF
- 2005 – South Atlantic League Player of the Week (4/17)
- 2005 – SAL All-Star OF
- 2005 – SAL Player of the Week (8/7)
- 2005 – Topps SAL Player of the Month (8/31)
- 2005 – SAL Post-Season All-Star OF

== Jewish heritage ==
According to Baseball Almanac, Horwitz was the 159th Jewish player to make the majors. Horwitz became the first Jewish player to play with the Giants since the 1995–1996 tenure of pitcher Jose Bautista, and the eighth since they moved to San Francisco. Horwitz credited one set of grandparents for “instilling a lot of Jewish traits in our family,” said Horwitz. He played in the Maccabi Games when he was 15 and 16, leading his LA-area team to national titles in 1996 and 1997.

In 2009, he was one of the ballplayers honored in the fifth edition of Jewish Major Leaguers baseball cards.

== See also ==
- List of Jewish Major League Baseball players
- Rule 5 draft results
