= Travis Denker =

American baseball player and coach (born 1985)

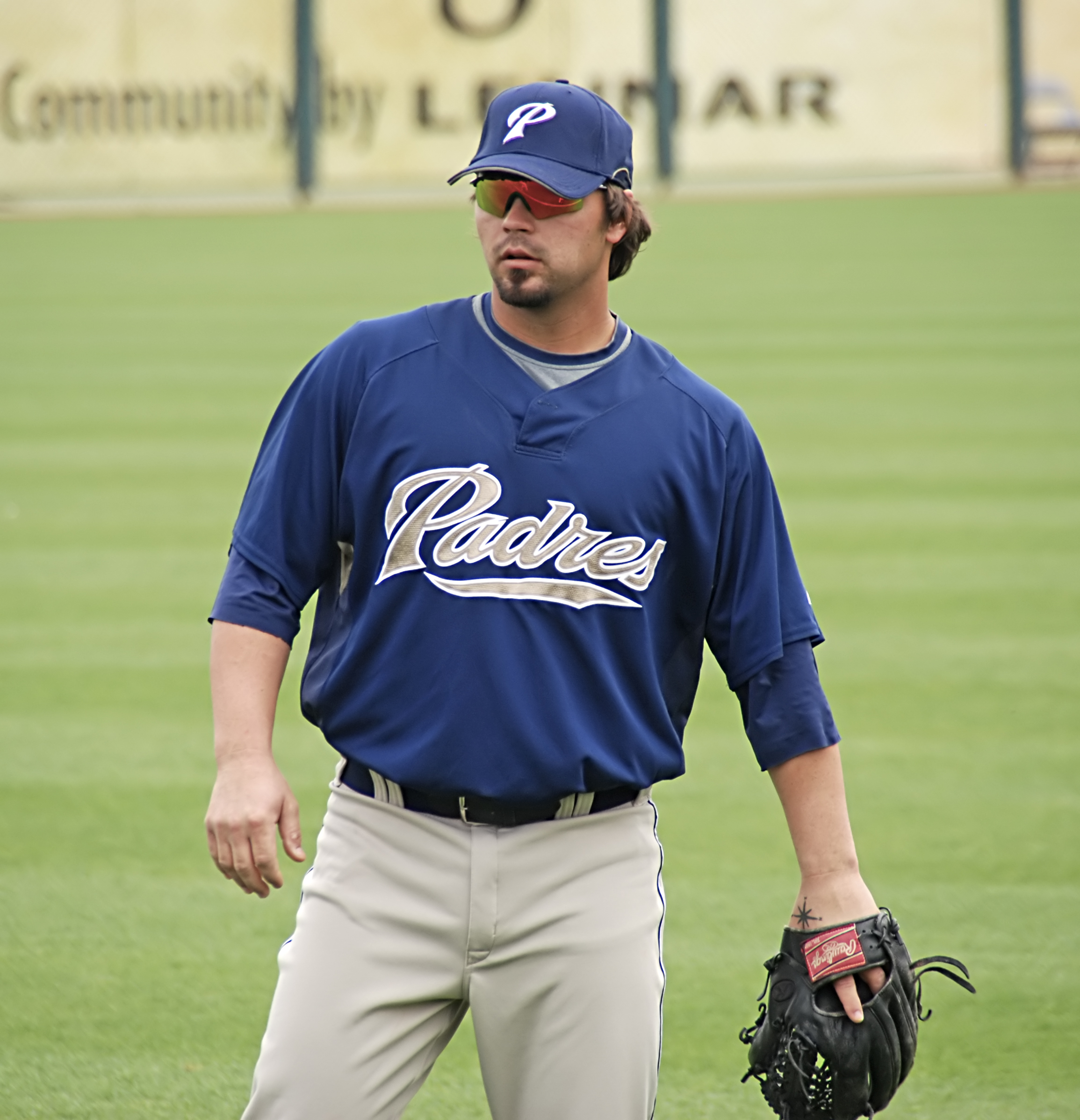
- Denker with the San Diego Padres

Arizona Diamondbacks – No. 73
- Infielder / Coach
- Born: August 5, 1985 (age 40); Fountain Valley, California, U.S.
- Batted: Right Threw: Right

MLB debut
- May 21, 2008, for the San Francisco Giants

Last MLB appearance
- July 10, 2008, for the San Francisco Giants

MLB statistics
- Batting average: .243
- Home runs: 1
- Runs batted in: 3
- Stats at Baseball Reference

Teams
- As player: San Francisco Giants (2008); As coach: Arizona Diamondbacks (2025-present)

Travis Norton Denker (born August 5, 1985) is an American former professional baseball infielder and current assistant hitting coach for the Arizona Diamondbacks of Major League Baseball (MLB). He played in MLB for the San Francisco Giants.

Prior to playing professional baseball, Denker attended Brea Olinda High School.

== Professional career ==
=== Los Angeles Dodgers ===
Originally drafted by the Los Angeles Dodgers in the 21st round of the 2003 Major League Baseball draft, Denker signed and started his professional career that very same year. He split time between the South Georgia Waves and Gulf Coast League Dodgers, combining to hit .264 with three home runs and 14 RBI in 46 games.

Denker spent the entire 2004 season with the Ogden Raptors, with whom he hit .311 with 12 home runs and 43 RBI in 57 games. In 2005, he split time between the Columbus Catfish and Vero Beach Dodgers, combining to hit .281 with 23 home runs and 77 RBI in 132 games. He split time again between the two teams in 2006, hitting .247 with 16 home runs and 70 RBI in 129 games. He also walked 89 times and struck out 73 times.

=== San Francisco Giants ===
He spent most of the 2007 season with the Inland Empire 66ers until the Dodgers traded him to the Giants on August 25, 2007, as the PTBNL from a trade for Mark Sweeney on August 9, 2007. Denker finished the season playing for the Giants High-A affiliate, the San Jose Giants and helped lead them to the California League championship. For the year, Denker hit .300 with 11 home runs and 66 RBI in 118 games.

Denker was called up on May 12, 2008, and got his first major league hit against the Florida Marlins on May 25, 2008, which was a double down the third base line. He hit his first home run against Scott Schoeneweis of the New York Mets on June 3, 2008.

=== San Diego Padres ===
After spending the rest of the 2008 season in the minor leagues, Denker was claimed off waivers by the San Diego Padres. He appeared in only one game for the Double–A San Antonio Missions.

=== Boston Red Sox ===
On April 14, 2009, the Boston Red Sox claimed Denker off waivers from the Padres. He appeared in 117 games for the Pawtucket Red Sox, hitting .238.

=== Los Angeles Dodgers ===
He signed a minor league contract with Seattle Mariners for 2010 season, but he was released April 24, 2010 after only 7 games with the Tacoma Rainiers and signed by the Los Angeles Dodgers on May 4.

In 2010, he played in 74 games for the Inland Empire 66ers of San Bernardino, 16 games for the Chattanooga Lookouts and 13 games for the Albuquerque Isotopes.

In 2011, he was in 55 games for the Rancho Cucamonga Quakes and 66 for the Lookouts. Combined he hit .274 with 25 home runs and 81 RBI. In 2012, he continued with the Lookouts, appearing in 64 games and hitting only .228. He was released on July 27.

=== Independent leagues ===
Denker signed with the Lancaster Barnstormers on August 4, 2012. He played with them through 2013 and then signed with the Laredo Lemurs of the American Association of Independent Professional Baseball.

He led the American Association in home runs while with the Laredo Lemurs.

=== Arizona Diamondbacks ===
On June 11, 2016, Denker signed a minor league contract with the Arizona Diamondbacks organization. He played in 68 games for the Double–A Mobile BayBears, hitting .303/.416/.555 with 13 home runs and 36 RBI. Denker elected free agency following the season on November 7.

On November 22, 2016, Denker signed a new minor league contract with the Diamondbacks. Denker spent the 2017 season with the Double–A Jackson Generals, logging a .296/.399/.468 batting line with 7 home runs and 28 RBI. He elected free agency following the season on November 6, 2017.

== Coaching career ==
In 2024, Denker was hired to serve as the hitting coach of the Reno Aces, the Triple–A affiliate of the Arizona Diamondbacks.

On December 13, 2024, Denker was named on to the Diamondbacks's major league coaching staff as their assistant hitting coach.
