= Jack Taschner =

American baseball player (born 1978)

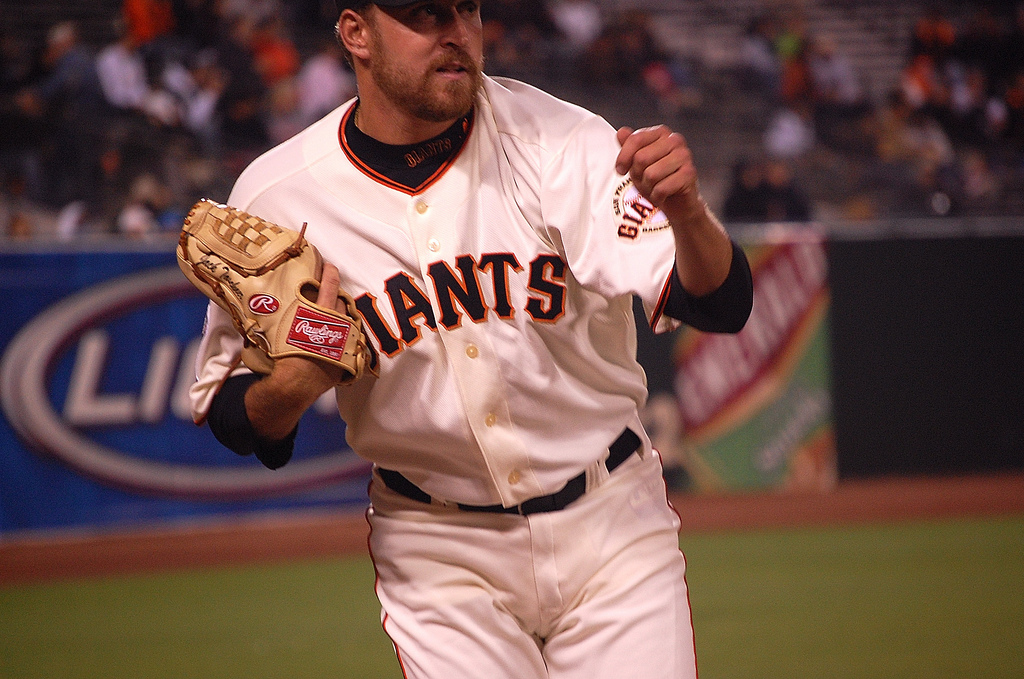
- Taschner with the San Francisco Giants
- Relief pitcher
- Born: April 21, 1978 (age 48); Milwaukee, Wisconsin, U.S.
- Batted: Left Threw: Left

MLB debut
- June 3, 2005, for the San Francisco Giants

Last MLB appearance
- July 28, 2010, for the Los Angeles Dodgers

MLB statistics
- Win–loss record: 10–5
- Earned run average: 5.14
- Strikeouts: 160
- Stats at Baseball Reference

Teams
- San Francisco Giants (2005–2008); Philadelphia Phillies (2009); Pittsburgh Pirates (2010); Los Angeles Dodgers (2010)

Jack Gerard Taschner (born April 21, 1978) is a former left-handed Major League Baseball relief pitcher. He played for the San Francisco Giants, Philadelphia Phillies, Pittsburgh Pirates, and Los Angeles Dodgers. In his major league career (2005–2010), he won 10 games and struck out 160 batters in 189 innings.

== High School and College ==
Taschner attended William Horlick High School in Racine, Wisconsin. Where he was selected in the 37th round by the then California Angels. After graduating, he chose not to sign and went on to the University of Wisconsin–Oshkosh, where he posted a 7–0 record in nine games (eight starts) and a 1.53 earned run average (ERA) during the 1999 season. He struck out 79 batters in his senior season while walking only 41. Taschner was drafted again, this time by the San Francisco Giants in the second round of the 1999 Major League Baseball draft.

== Professional career ==
=== San Francisco Giants ===
Taschner was drafted again, this time by the San Francisco Giants in the second round of the 1999 Major League Baseball draft. The Giants assigned him to their short season A-level minor league affiliate, the Salem-Keizer Volcanoes of the Northwest League. Taschner earned a 3–2 record in the latter half of 1999, striking out 36 batters in 29 innings. He injured his shoulder in his last outing for Salem-Keizer. After surgery he sat out all but one month of the 2000 season for the San Jose Giants. He returned to San Jose in 2001, where he pitched 2 1/2 months, making the California league all-star team. Unable to pitch in the game or the rest of the season, he had surgery again, this time on his left elbow. Between the two years, Taschner posted a 6–6 record in 24 games (16 starts), striking out 94 batters in two years while pitching a total of 88 innings. However, he hit another setback in 2002, as he missed the entire season recovering from Tommy John surgery. The road to recovery was not easy for Taschner, as his record with the Norwich Navigators in 2003 was 0–6; he posted an ERA of 5.68, the highest of his minor league career to date, striking out only 46 batters and allowing 48 earned runs. Taschner's 3–1 record with Norwich in 2004 was enough to earn him a promotion to the AAA Fresno Grizzlies, where he had a 4–7 record. Taschner remained at Fresno to begin the 2005 season, but he began to work exclusively as a relief pitcher and regained the form of his early career, posting a 3–0 record and a 1.64 ERA before being called up to the major leagues for the first time. Taschner was first called up to the Giants on June 12, 2005. In his first season, he made 24 appearances as a reliever, notching a 2–0 record with 19 strikeouts and a 1.59 ERA. Taschner earned his first major league win on August 30 against the Colorado Rockies when the Giants rallied for a comeback win in the ninth inning. In 2006, he made the Opening Day roster, but was sent back to the minor leagues after posting a 34.71 ERA in 2 1/3 innings; he posted a 6–7 record with Fresno and struck out 68 batters in 49 1/3 innings. He spent more time with the Giants throughout the season as well, making 24 appearances and posting no wins with an 8.38 ERA in the major leagues.

Taschner's first full season in the major leagues saw him rank third on the team in appearances. He pitched 50 innings out of the Giants' bullpen, striking out 51 batters in 63 games. He allowed a .235 opponents' batting average, which was lowest among all qualifying relievers. He also allowed only 19 hits to right-handed batters over the entire season, qualifying him as a left-handed specialist. Taschner's 2008 season yielded a strong performance, in which he allowed only 26 earned runs in 48 innings; he struck out 39 batters while walking 24.

=== Philadelphia Phillies ===
On March 27, 2009, Taschner was traded to the Philadelphia Phillies for catcher Ronny Paulino. He appeared in 24 games with the Phillies, with a 1–1 record and 4.91 ERA. In November 2009 Taschner was granted free agency after being outrighted to Triple-A.

=== Pittsburgh Pirates ===
On December 23, 2009, Taschner signed a minor league contract with the Pittsburgh Pirates with an invitation to spring training.

On June 9, 2010, he was designated for assignment after having a 6.05 ERA in 17 appearances, with 19.1 innings, 17 strikeouts, eight walks, and one win. On June 19, 2010, Taschner declared free agency after refusing an outright assignment to the minors.

=== Los Angeles Dodgers ===
On June 27, 2010, he signed a minor league contract with the Los Angeles Dodgers and was assigned to the AAA Albuquerque Isotopes. He was promoted to the Dodgers on July 21. He only retired one batter while with the Dodgers. Taschner is a left-handed baseball pitcher. He appeared in just three games for the Dodgers before being designated for assignment on July 29. He elected to declare free agency instead of accepting a minor league assignment.

== Community ==
Taschner is active in the San Francisco community with a variety of charities. He has worked with both the Shriner's Hospital and Habitat for Humanity during his tenure with the Giants. He has also instructed at a baseball skills clinic for children participating in the Special Olympics.

== Post-Baseball career ==
After his playing career ended, he chose to become a police officer in Appleton, Wisconsin in 2011. He has risen to the rank of Captain as of 2026. He and his wife decided to raise their family in the Appleton area while he was still playing professional ball. In 2015, he became commissioner of his son's 7- to 8-year-old league. He became the head coach at Neenah High School in July 2018 after being an assistant coach.
