= Erick Threets =

American baseball player (born 1981)

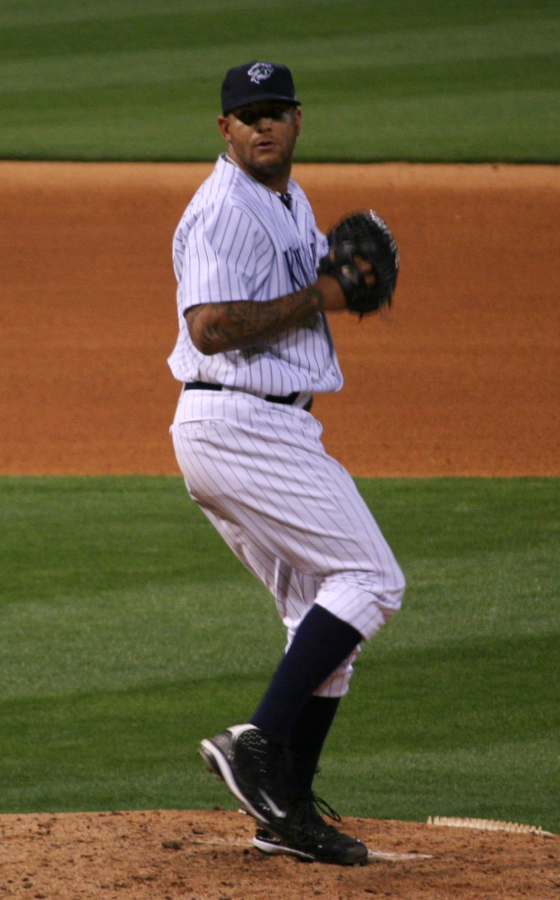
- Threets with the Charlotte Knights in 2010
- Pitcher
- Born: November 4, 1981 (age 44); Hayward, California, U.S.
- Batted: Right Threw: Left

MLB debut
- September 12, 2007, for the San Francisco Giants

Last MLB appearance
- August 27, 2010, for the Chicago White Sox

MLB statistics
- Win–loss record: 0–1
- Earned run average: 3.28
- Strikeouts: 13
- Stats at Baseball Reference

Teams
- San Francisco Giants (2007–2008); Chicago White Sox (2010)

Erick Morgan Threets (born November 4, 1981) is an American former professional baseball pitcher. Threets played in Major League Baseball (MLB) for the San Francisco Giants and Chicago White Sox. He attended Mendenhall Middle School and Granada High School in Livermore, California.

== Career ==
=== Amateur ===
Threets attended Modesto Junior College, and in 2000 he played collegiate summer baseball with the Cotuit Kettleers of the Cape Cod Baseball League. He was selected by the San Francisco Giants in the 7th round of the 2000 MLB draft.

=== San Francisco Giants ===
He was prospect number 20 in the Baseball America Prospect Handbook 2008 for the Giants, and his changeup was rated the best in the Giants' minor league system. Threets made his Major League Baseball debut with the San Francisco Giants in 2007. He appeared in 3 games in 2007 and 7 in 2008 for the Giants.

=== Los Angeles Dodgers ===
Threets signed a minor league contract with the Los Angeles Dodgers after the 2008 season and was assigned to the Triple–A Albuquerque Isotopes.

=== Chicago White Sox ===
On January 14, 2010, Threets signed a minor league contract with the Chicago White Sox. On August 29, Threets injured his throwing arm after throwing a pitch against the New York Yankees. He was placed on the disabled list, and had Tommy John surgery shortly thereafter, which caused him to miss the entirety of the 2011 season. With the White Sox in 2010, Threets allowed no earned runs in 12 1/3 innings.

=== Oakland Athletics ===
Threets signed a minor league contract with the Oakland Athletics on December 9, 2011. He was granted his release on July 14, 2012, after recording a 1.84 earned run average in 44 innings for the Triple-A Sacramento River Cats.

=== Later career ===
Threets signed a minor league contract with the Los Angeles Dodgers on July 17, 2012, and was assigned to the Triple-A Albuquerque Isotopes, where he was 2–2 with a 5.19 ERA in 17 1/3 innings (18 games). In December 2012, Threets signed a minor league contract with the Colorado Rockies. He signed for Long Island Ducks of the Atlantic League of Professional Baseball for the 2013 season. He signed a minor league contract with the Arizona Diamondbacks in February 2015.
