= Iván Ochoa (baseball) =

Venezuelan baseball player (born 1982)

- Shortstop
- Born: December 16, 1982 (age 43); Guacara, Venezuela
- Batted: Right Threw: Right

MLB debut
- July 12, 2008, for the San Francisco Giants

Last MLB appearance
- September 28, 2008, for the San Francisco Giants

MLB statistics
- Batting average: .200
- Home runs: 0
- Runs batted in: 3
- Stats at Baseball Reference

Teams
- San Francisco Giants (2008)

Iván G. Ochoa (born December 16, 1982) is a Venezuelan former professional baseball shortstop. He played in Major League Baseball (MLB) for the San Francisco Giants in 2008. Ochoa is from Guacara, Venezuela.

== Professional career ==
=== Cleveland Indians ===
Ochoa was signed as a free agent by the Cleveland Indians on May 3, 2000. He struggled offensively during his six years in the Indians organization, but did receive a promotion to Triple-A Buffalo in 2006.

=== San Francisco Giants ===
After the 2006 season, Ochoa signed with the San Francisco Giants and was invited to spring training. Ochoa spent all of 2007 with Triple-A Fresno, batting .296 in 47 games. Ochoa started 2008 in Triple-A again, but was called up to the major league team after batting .318 and stealing 20 bases in 84 games. He made his major league debut on July 12, 2008 against the Chicago Cubs. His first hit was a double to left field in the ninth inning off of Carlos Mármol. He appeared in 47 games for the Giants, batting .200.

=== Boston Red Sox ===
Ochoa was released after the 2008 season by the Giants and signed with the Boston Red Sox on January 27, 2009. He appeared in 45 games for the AAA Pawtucket Red Sox before he was released on August 19, 2009.

=== Golden Baseball League ===
He played with the Tijuana Cimarrones of the Golden Baseball League in 2010, appearing in 19 games.

=== Los Angeles Dodgers ===
Ochoa was signed by the Los Angeles Dodgers on February 10, 2011 and assigned to the AA Chattanooga Lookouts, where he appeared in 84 games and hit .233. He was promoted to the AAA Albuquerque Isotopes at the end of the season and appeared in 18 games for them, hitting .257.

== See also ==
- List of Major League Baseball players from Venezuela
