= Merkin Valdez =

Dominican baseball player (born 1981)

- Pitcher
- Born: November 10, 1981 (age 44); San Cristóbal, Dominican Republic
- Batted: Right Threw: Right

MLB debut
- August 1, 2004, for the San Francisco Giants

Last MLB appearance
- September 25, 2011, for the Texas Rangers

MLB statistics
- Win–loss record: 3–1
- Earned run average: 5.57
- Strikeouts: 59
- Stats at Baseball Reference

Teams
- San Francisco Giants (2004, 2008–2009); Toronto Blue Jays (2010); Texas Rangers (2011)

Merkin R. Valdéz Mola (born November 10, 1981) is a Dominican former professional baseball pitcher. He played in Major League Baseball (MLB) for the San Francisco Giants, Toronto Blue Jays, and Texas Rangers. Valdez graduated from Escuela Rural Palenque High School in his native Dominican Republic.

== Career ==
=== Atlanta Braves ===
Valdez was signed by the Atlanta Braves as an amateur free agent in 1999. He played with the Dominican Summer League Braves in 2000 and 2001 and the rookie-level Gulf Coast League Braves in 2002.

=== San Francisco Giants ===
Valdez was traded by the Braves with Damian Moss to the San Francisco Giants in exchange for Russ Ortiz on December 17, 2002. He was named San Francisco's Minor League Player of the Year and selected as a Low-A All-Star in 2003 when he went 9–5 with a 2.25 ERA for the Hagerstown Suns in the South Atlantic League. In 2004, Valdez pitched for Single-A San Jose Giants, Double-A Norwich Navigators, Triple-A Fresno Grizzlies, and made his Major League debut on August 1, 2004, against the St. Louis Cardinals. He appeared in 2 games for the Giants, working 1 2/3 innings for a 27.00 ERA. Valdez was selected to the World squad for the All-Star Futures Game for 3 consecutive years (2003–05), held in conjunction with MLB All-Star festivities.

Valdez spent all of 2005 with Norwich, and all of 2006 with Fresno, until injuring his arm. He missed the entire 2007 season after undergoing Tommy John surgery on September 27, 2006.

Valdez returned to the Giants to appear in 17 games in 2007 and 48 games in 2009. He was designated for assignment on January 14, 2010, by the Giants to make room on the 40-man roster for Aubrey Huff.

=== Toronto Blue Jays ===
On January 20, 2010, Valdez was traded to the Toronto Blue Jays in exchange for cash considerations. He appeared in two games with the Blue Jays during the season, spending most of the season with the Las Vegas 51s. Valdez became a free agent following the season.

=== Los Angeles Dodgers ===
On February 2, 2011, Valdez was signed to a minor league contract by the Los Angeles Dodgers. The Dodgers assigned him to the Triple-A Albuquerque Isotopes. Valdez opted out of his contract on July 18 and became a free agent. He had appeared in 38 games with the Isotopes with a 4–2 record, a 3.58 ERA, 43 strikeouts, and 5 saves.

=== Texas Rangers ===
On July 24, 2011, Valdez signed a minor league contract with the Texas Rangers. He was assigned to the Triple-A Round Rock Express, and had his contract selected on September 1. In five appearances for Texas, Valdez posted a 6.23 ERA with 6 strikeouts across 4 1/3 innings pitched. On November 2, Valdez was removed from the 40-man roster and sent outright to Triple-A Oklahoma City. He elected free agency two days later.

=== Oakland Athletics ===
On December 22, 2011, Valdez signed a minor league contract with the Oakland Athletics. In 36 appearances split between the rookie-level Arizona League Athletics and Triple-A Sacramento River Cats, he accumulated a 3.46 ERA with 27 strikeouts and 5 saves across 39 innings of work. Valdez elected free agency following the season on November 3, 2012.

== Personal life ==
When Valdez was first traded to the Giants, he went by the name Manny Mateo. While in his first year with the organization, however, his real name and real age (nine months older than he previously claimed) were revealed.

Valdez's younger brother, Jesús is also a professional baseball player. Valdez has a son, Merkin Hanier, born August 11, 2006.
