= San Jose Giants =

- Founded in 1962; San Jose, California
Team logo
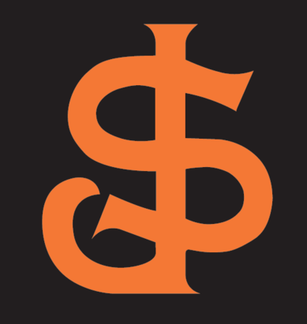
Cap insignia

Minor league affiliations
- Class: Single-A (2021–present)
- Previous classes: Class A-Advanced (1979–2020); Triple-A (1977–1978)
- League: California League (1979–present)
- Division: North Division
- Previous leagues: Pacific Coast League (1977–1978)

Major league affiliations
- Team: San Francisco Giants (1988–present)
- Previous teams: Montreal Expos (1982); Co-op (1981); Seattle Mariners (1978–1980); Oakland Athletics (1977); Cleveland Indians (1975–1976); Kansas City Royals (1970–1974; 1983-1987); Los Angeles/California Angels (1962–1969)

Minor league titles
- League titles (11): 1962; 1967; 1979; 1998; 2001; 2005; 2007; 2009; 2010; 2021; 2025
- Division titles (11): 1995; 1996; 1998; 1999; 2001; 2005; 2007; 2009; 2010; 2025; 2026
- First-half titles (3): 2023; 2025; 2026
- Second-half titles (3): 2022; 2024; 2026

Team data
- Name: San Jose Giants (1988–present)
- Previous names: San Jose Bees (1983–1987); San Jose Expos (1982); San Jose Missions (1977–1981); San Jose Bees (1962–1976)
- Mascot: Gigante (2006-present)
- Ballpark: Excite Ballpark (1988–present)
- Owner/ Operator: Diamond Baseball Holdings
- President: Daniel Orum
- General manager: Ben Taylor
- Manager: Ydwin Villegas
- Website: milb.com/san-jose

The San Jose Giants are a Minor League Baseball team of the California League and the Single-A affiliate of the San Francisco Giants. Located in San Jose, California, the Giants play their home games at Excite Ballpark.

== Games ==
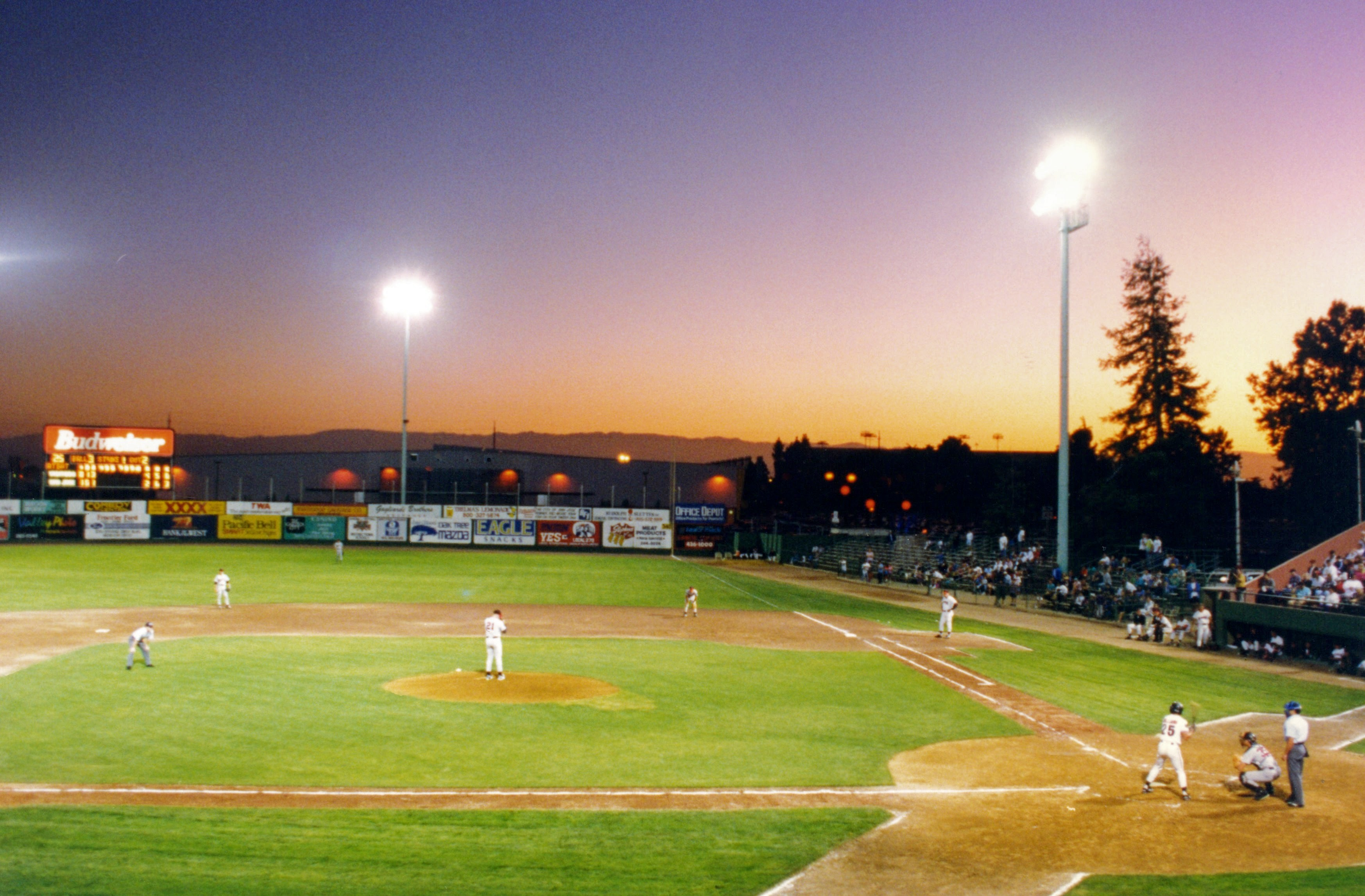
A San Jose Giants game in 1994

San Jose Giants games are very much rooted in the older traditions of baseball. Fans sit very close to the field, general admission seating is available for games, players sign autographs before every game, and the outfield walls are lined with advertisements much like the stadiums of the 1920s and 1930s were. A simple scoreboard shows basic game data like runs, strikes, balls, and outs. This was updated in 2005 to feature lights to denote the count (three lights for strikes and four for balls) rather than numbers. The out-of-town scoreboard displaying other California League game scores was manually operated using hand-hung number cards. In 2006, the simple scoreboard was replaced with a 21-by-15-foot video screen costing $500,000, and the out-of-town scoreboard was no longer used. Between innings, fans are treated to a variety of games and entertainment, such as kids' air guitar, a child footrace around the bases, or throwing a baseball at a truck's headlights for prizes. The San Jose Giants also added a mascot, Gigante, for the 2006 season. Before Gigante's introduction, San Francisco Giants mascot Lou Seal made occasional appearances.

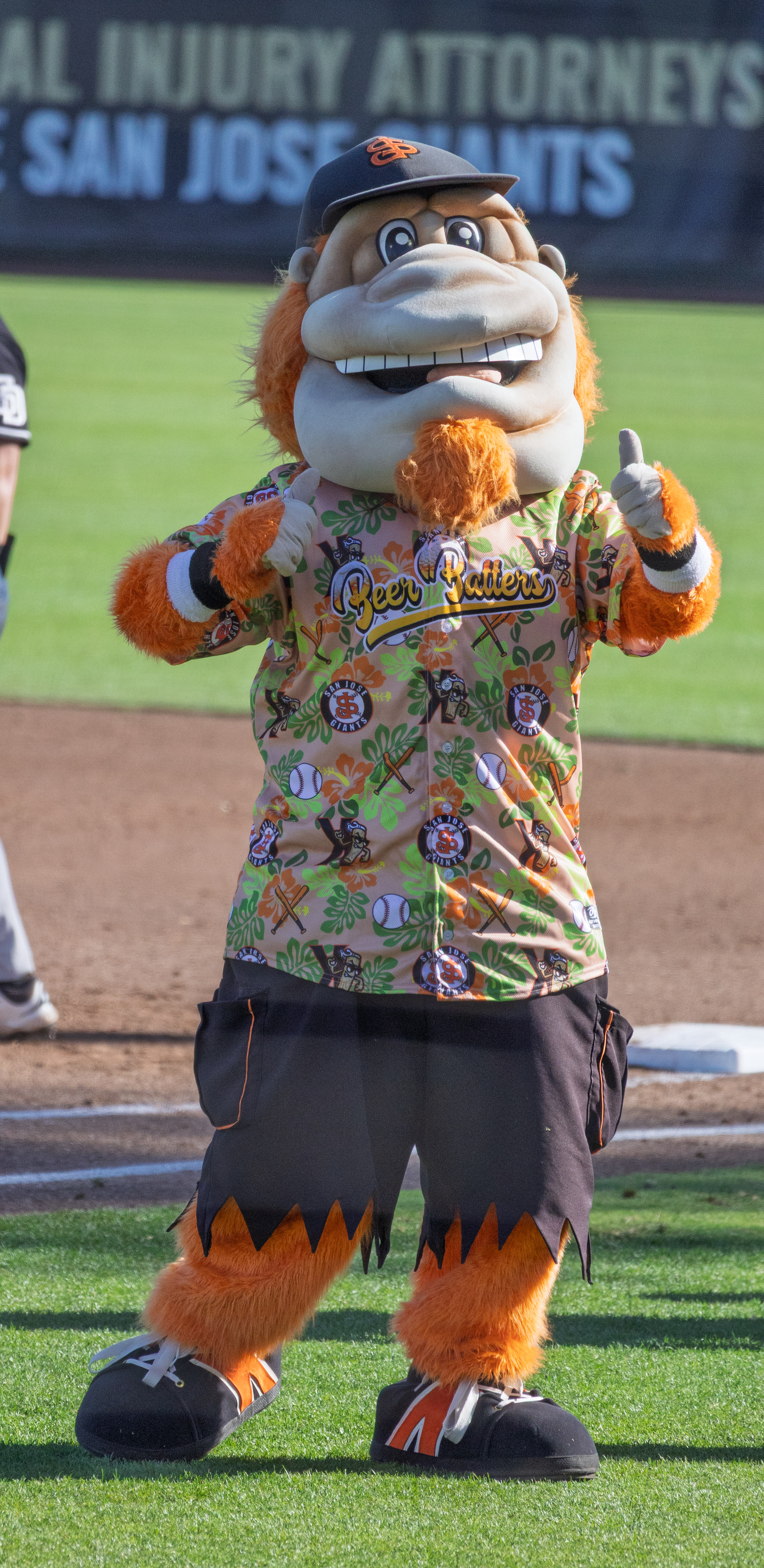
San Jose Giants mascot Gigante in 2026

San Jose Giants games were often the home of Krazy George, a well known "fan" in the San Francisco Bay Area who attended not only SJ Giants games, but also many of the MLB, NFL, NHL, and NCAA football games in the region.

== History ==
San Jose has hosted multiple minor league baseball teams throughout its history, including the San Jose Red Sox, who played from 1947 to 1958. The current lineage can be traced back to the San Jose Bees who joined the California League in 1962 as an affiliate of the expansion Los Angeles Angels. They switched to a Kansas City Royals affiliate from 1970–1974 and a Cleveland Indians affiliate in 1975–1976. Many players on the Kansas City Royals teams of the 1970s and 1980s, including George Brett, Amos Otis, and Dennis Leonard played in San Jose.

The Sacramento Solons then leased the San Jose affiliate for two seasons, when they were known as the San Jose Missions and played in the Pacific Coast League as an affiliate of the Oakland Athletics and Seattle Mariners. In 1982 the club became affiliated with the Montreal Expos and was known as the San Jose Expos. The Expos ended their affiliation after one year and the renamed Bees became an independent club.

As an independent club, the Bees were free to sign players from Nippon Professional Baseball; the Seibu Lions sent several players to the Bees on loan in this period including Norio Tanabe and Kimiyasu Kudo. The 1986 Bees employed five decorated former Major Leaguers who struggled with drugs and alcohol and were effectively blacklisted by Major League Baseball: Steve Howe, Mike Norris, Ken Reitz, Todd Cruz and Daryl Sconiers. The mix of disgraced former stars and Japanese imports attracted attention from such publications as The Times, Rolling Stone, The New York Times, The Washington Post and the Los Angeles Times.

== San Jose Giants (1988–present) ==
The team was sold to a group led by Winston H. Cox in 1987. The current affiliation with the San Francisco Giants began in 1988. Since the team's inception, the San Jose Giants have been one of the more successful teams in the California League. They captured the league championship in 1998, 2001, 2005, 2007, 2009, 2010, 2021 and most recently in 2025. In 2005 and once again in 2007 after being down 0–2 in the best of 5 series, came back home and won the final three games over Lake Elsinore Storm to claim the Championship Series 3–2. (In 2001 the Giants were declared co-champions with the Lake Elsinore Storm after the final series was canceled after the September 11 terrorist attacks). The team has also made the California League playoffs numerous times and won the Northern Division championship 8 times. The Giants also had the best record of any minor league class A team in the 1990s.

The Giants success has shown at the turnstile as attendance has increased 14 of the last 17 years. The SJ Giants are now in their 24th season being affiliated with the San Francisco Giants. This makes the SJ Giants affiliation the longest currently enjoyed by a team in the California League. 2008 marked a second highest team record attendance of 183,788 for the season.

The San Jose Giants have developed more than 190 major league players, including Buster Posey, Tim Lincecum, Jonathan Sánchez, Matt Cain, Brian Horwitz, Noah Lowry, Merkin Valdez, Chad Zerbe, Russ Ortiz, Bill Mueller, Doug Mirabelli, Rod Beck, Joe Nathan, Francisco Liriano, Shawn Estes, Emmanuel Burriss, Andrés Torres, Pablo Sandoval, Madison Bumgarner and Adam Duvall.

In conjunction with Major League Baseball's restructuring of Minor League Baseball in 2021, the Giants were organized into the Low-A West at the Low-A classification. In 2022, the Low-A West became known as the California League, the name historically used by the regional circuit prior to the 2021 reorganization, and was reclassified as a Single-A circuit.

== Roster ==
San Jose Giants roster
Players	Coaches/Other
Pitchers: 55 Ben Bybee; 31 Dylan Carter; 34 Argenis Cayama; 49 Samir Chires; 17 R.J. Dabovich #; 46 Ricardo Estrada; 9 Jackson Flora; 40 Alexander Fuentes; 50 Evan Gray; 39 Ian Korn; 18 Chen-Hsun Lee; 28 Nick Margevicius #; 37 Keyner Martinez; 43 Cooper McGrath; 40 Erik Miller * #; 48 Jose T. Perez; 41 Melvin Pineda; 54 Leandro Rodriguez; 32 Trey Seeley; 19 Fernando Vasquez; Catchers: 33 Junior Barajas; 17 Scott Gell; 2 Broedy Poppell; Infielders: 1 Josuar González; 39 Luis Hernández; 23 Jeremiah Jenkins; 35 Lorenzo Meola; 16 Luke Nixon; 6 Dario Reynoso; 15 Yosneiker Rivas; 7 Drew Smith; Outfielders: 15 Peyton Bonds; 10 Angel Guzman; 57 Tanner Mally; 29 Andy Polanco; 26 Oliver Tejada	Manager: 12 Ydwin Villegas; Coaches: 58 Mike Marjama (hitting); 8 Drew Martinez (fundamentals); 45 Dan Runzler (pitching); 60-day injured list: 51 Cody Delvecchio; -- Drake George; 59 Garrett Langrell; 7-day injured list; * On San Francisco Giants 40-man roster; ~ Development list; # Rehab assignment; ∞ Reserve list; ‡ Restricted list; § Suspended list; † Temporarily inactive list; Roster updated September 4, 2026; Transactions; → More rosters: MiLB • California League; → San Francisco Giants minor league players

== Notable alumni ==
Baseball Hall of Fame alumni
- George Brett (1972) Inducted, 1999

Japanese Baseball Hall of Fame Alumni

- Koji Akiyama (1982-83) Inducted, 2014

Other notable alumni

- Jay Johnstone (1963, 1965)
- Tom Burgmeier (1964) MLB All-Star
- Dave LaRoche (1967, 1969)) 2x MLB All-Star
- Rudy May (1967) 1980 AL ERA Leader
- Doug Bird (1970-1971)
- Steve Busby (1971) 2x MLB All-Star
- Al Cowens (1971-1972)
- John Wathan (1971-1972)
- Frank White (1972) 5x MLB All-Star; 8x Gold Glove
- Dennis Leonard (1973)
- Jamie Quirk (1973)
- Ruppert Jones (1974)
- U.L. Washington (1974)
- Alfredo Griffin (1975-1976) MLB All-Star; 1979 AL Rookie of the Year
- Ron Hassey (1976)
- Steve McCatty (1977, 1986-1987)
- Mike Norris (1977) MLB All-Star
- Tom Paciorek (1978) MLB All-Star
- Bud Black (1979-1980) 2010 NL Manager of the Year
- Dave Henderson (1979) MLB All-Star
- Blue Moon Odom (1977)
- Ken Reitz (1986) MLB All-Star
- Brian Harper (1987)
- Charlie Moore (1987)
- Elias Sosa (1987)
- Gil Heredia (1988)
- Rod Beck (1989) 3x MLB All-Star
- Royce Clayton, 1989–90 MLB All-Star
- Dave Dravecky (1989) MLB All-Star
- Kevin Bass (1990-1991) MLB All-Star
- Pat Rapp (1991)
- Doug Mirabelli (1992-1993)
- Mike Myers (1992)
- Bill Mueller (1994) 2003 AL Batting Title
- Shawn Estes (1995) MLB All-Star
- Keith Foulke (1995) MLB All-Star
- Bobby Howry (1995)
- Russ Ortiz (1995–1996) MLB All-Star
- Jason Grilli (1997) MLB All-Star
- Scott Linebrink (1997)
- Joe Nathan (1998) 6x MLB All-Star
- Ryan Vogelsong (1998–1999) MLB All-Star
- Matt Cain (2004) 3x MLB All-Star
- Tim Lincecum (2006 ) 5x MLB All-Star; 2008 & 2009 NL Cy Young Award
- Sergio Romo (2007) MLB All-Star
- Pablo Sandoval (2007–08) 2x MLB All-Star; 2012 World Series Most Valuable Player
- Madison Bumgarner (2009) 4x MLB All-Star; 2014 World Series Most Valuable Player
- Brandon Crawford (2009) 3x MLB All-Star; 3x Gold Glove Award; Silver Slugger
- Buster Posey (2009) 2010 NL Rookie of the Year; 7x MLB All-Star; NL Most Valuable Player (2012); 4x Silver Slugger Award; Gold Glove Award
- Adam Duvall (2012) 2016 MLB All-Star; 3x Gold Glove nominee, Home Run Derby Participant 2016, San Jose Giants 2012 Home Run Record (30)
- Kyle Harrison (2021)
- Luis Matos (2021), 2021 California League MVP
