= 2006 Pittsburgh Pirates season =

2006 Pittsburgh Pirates
- League: National League
- Division: Central
- Ballpark: PNC Park
- City: Pittsburgh, Pennsylvania
- Record: 67–95 (.414)
- Divisional place: 5th
- Owners: Kevin McClatchy
- General managers: Dave Littlefield
- Managers: Jim Tracy
- Television: FSN Pittsburgh
- Radio: KDKA-AM (Steve Blass, Greg Brown, Lanny Frattare, Bob Walk, John Wehner)

The 2006 Pittsburgh Pirates season was the 125th season of the franchise; the 120th in the National League. This was their sixth season at PNC Park. The Pirates finished fifth in the National League Central with a record of 67–95. The Pirates also hosted the All-Star Game on July 11.

== Regular season ==
=== Season standings ===
NL Central
Team	W	L	Pct.	GB	Home	Road
St. Louis Cardinals	83	78	.516	—	49‍–‍31	34‍–‍47
Houston Astros	82	80	.506	1½	44‍–‍37	38‍–‍43
Cincinnati Reds	80	82	.494	3½	42‍–‍39	38‍–‍43
Milwaukee Brewers	75	87	.463	8½	48‍–‍33	27‍–‍54
Pittsburgh Pirates	67	95	.414	16½	43‍–‍38	24‍–‍57
Chicago Cubs	66	96	.407	17½	36‍–‍45	30‍–‍51

=== Game log ===
2006 game log (67–95)
**April (7–19)**

#	Date	Opponent	Score	Win	Loss	Save	Attendance	Record
1	April 3	@ Brewers	2–5	Lehr	**Torres** (0–1)	Turnbow	45,023	0–1
2	April 4	@ Brewers	5–7	Capuano	**Santos** (0–1)	Turnbow	15,515	0–2
3	April 5	@ Brewers	2–3	Wise	**Marte** (0–1)	Turnbow	15,430	0–3
4	April 6	@ Reds	5–6	White	**Gonzalez** (0–1)	Weathers	13,887	0–4
5	April 7	@ Reds	6–7	Milton	**Maholm** (0–1)	Mercker	16,573	0–5
6	April 8	@ Reds	9–11	Harang	**Perez** (0–1)	White	20,244	0–6
7	April 9	@ Reds	5–3	**Santos** (1–1)	Williams	**Hernandez** (1)	22,090	1–6
8	April 10	Dodgers	3–8	Perez	**Duke** (0–1)	—	39,129	1–7
9	April 11	Dodgers	7–6	**Torres** (1–1)	Carter	**Gonzalez** (1)	17,240	2–7
10	April 12	Dodgers	9–5	**Torres** (2–1)	Kuo	—	13,237	3–7
11	April 13	Dodgers	5–13	Lowe	**Perez** (0–2)	—	18,134	3–8
12	April 14	Cubs	6–11	Marshall	**Santos** (1–2)	—	20,233	3–9
13	April 15	Cubs	2–1	**Duke** (1–1)	Williams	**Gonzalez** (2)	34,264	4–9
14	April 16	Cubs	3–7	Rusch	**Snell** (0–1)	—	15,020	4–10
15	April 17	Cardinals	1–2	Marquis	**Maholm** (0–2)	Isringhausen	15,278	4–11
16	April 18	Cardinals	12–4	**Perez** (1–2)	Suppan	—	16,682	5–11
17	April 19	Cardinals	0–4	Carpenter	**Santos** (1–3)	—	15,085	5–12
18	April 21	@ Astros	2–3	Rodriguez	**Duke** (1–2)	Lidge	31,333	5–13
19	April 22	@ Astros	0–3	Buchholz	**Snell** (0–2)	Lidge	38,575	5–14
20	April 23	@ Astros	2–7	Oswalt	**Maholm** (0–3)	—	39,074	5–15
21	April 24	@ Cardinals	2–7	Carpenter	**Perez** (1–3)	—	38,953	5–16
22	April 25	@ Cardinals	3–6	Suppan	**Santos** (1–4)	Isringhausen	38,809	5–17
23	April 26	@ Cardinals	3–4	Isringhausen	**Hernandez** (0–1)	—	38,728	5–18
24	April 28	Phillies	3–1	**Snell** (1–2)	Myers	**Gonzalez** (3)	30,568	6–18
25	April 29	Phillies	3–2	**Maholm** (1–3)	Lidle	**Hernandez** (2)	33,944	7–18
26	April 30	Phillies	1–5	Floyd	**Perez** (1–4)	—	22,320	7–19

**May (12–15)**

#	Date	Opponent	Score	Win	Loss	Save	Attendance	Record
27	May 1	@ Cubs	1–2	Howry	**Grabow** (0–1)	Dempster	36,602	7–20
28	May 2	@ Cubs	8–0	**Duke** (2–2)	Guzman	—	39,110	8–20
29	May 3	@ Mets	3–4 (12)	Bradford	**Gonzalez** (0–2)	—	33,668	8–21
30	May 4	@ Mets	0–6	Glavine	**Maholm** (1–4)	—	30,756	8–22
31	May 5	@ Nationals	0–6	Day	**Perez** (1–5)	—	21,059	8–23
32	May 6	@ Nationals	5–4 (11)	**Gonzalez** (1–2)	Rodriguez	—	29,953	9–23
33	May 7	@ Nationals	4–5	O'Connor	**Duke** (2–3)	Cordero	30,659	9–24
34	May 9	Diamondbacks	3–0	**Snell** (2–2)	Batista	**Gonzalez** (4)	16,961	10–24
35	May 10	Diamondbacks	4–7	Webb	**Marte** (0–2)	Valverde	14,509	10–25
36	May 12	Marlins	12–9	**Capps** (1–0)	Wellemeyer	**Gonzalez** (5)	24,990	11–25
37	May 13	Marlins	3–4	Olsen	**Duke** (2–4)	Borowski	29,289	11–26
38	May 14	Marlins	2–8	Moehler	**Snell** (2–3)	—	15,921	11–27
39	May 16	Reds	9–3	**Maholm** (2–4)	Harang	—	14,315	12–27
40	May 17	Reds	7–2	**Perez** (2–5)	Arroyo	—	14,897	13–27
41	May 18	Reds	8–9	Belisle	**Capps** (1–1)	Coffey	18,502	13–28
42	May 19	@ Indians	1–4	Sabathia	**Duke** (2–5)	—	32,499	13–29
43	May 20	@ Indians	9–6	**Snell** (3–3)	Johnson	**Gonzalez** (6)	30,799	14–29
44	May 21	@ Indians	2–3 (10)	Wickman	**Gonzalez** (1–3)	—	31,589	14–30
45	May 22	@ Diamondbacks	3–4	Medders	**Marte** (0–3)	Valverde	18,103	14–31
46	May 23	@ Diamondbacks	3–7	Vargas	**Santos** (1–5)	—	19,993	14–32
47	May 24	@ Diamondbacks	7–8	Batista	**Duke** (2–6)	Valverde	18,394	14–33
48	May 26	Astros	12–5	**Snell** (4–3)	Buchholz	—	29,247	15–33
49	May 27	Astros	8–7 (18)	**Santos** (2–5)	Gallo	—	31,878	16–33
50	May 28	Astros	4–5 (10)	Qualls	**Torres** (2–2)	Lidge	24,992	16–34
51	May 29	Brewers	14–3	**Duke** (3–6)	Davis	—	17,561	17–34
52	May 30	Brewers	12–1	**Santos** (3–5)	De La Rosa	—	14,300	18–34
53	May 31	Brewers	6–1	**Snell** (5–3)	Capuano	—	15,434	19–34

**June (8–20)**

#	Date	Opponent	Score	Win	Loss	Save	Attendance	Record
54	June 1	Brewers	4–3	**Grabow** (1–1)	Turnbow	—	12,899	20–34
55	June 2	Padres	0–7 (6)	Park	**Perez** (2–6)	—	20,777	20–35
56	June 3	Padres	6–4	**Duke** (4–6)	Thompson	**Gonzalez** (7)	30,639	21–35
57	June 4	Padres	0–1	Young	**Santos** (3–6)	Hoffman	26,857	21–36
58	June 5	@ Rockies	5–2	**Snell** (6–3)	Cook	**Gonzalez** (8)	20,152	22–36
59	June 6	@ Rockies	4–5	Francis	**Maholm** (2–5)	Fuentes	20,277	22–37
60	June 7	@ Rockies	9–16	Dohmann	**Perez** (2–7)	—	21,509	22–38
61	June 8	@ Giants	4–5	Benitez	**Marte** (0–4)	—	34,540	22–39
62	June 9	@ Giants	3–2	**Santos** (4–6)	Morris	**Gonzalez** (9)	38,766	23–39
63	June 10	@ Giants	2–0	**Snell** (7–3)	Lowry	**Gonzalez** (10)	37,302	24–39
64	June 11	@ Giants	7–5	**Capps** (2–1)	Worrell	**Gonzalez** (11)	39,850	25–39
65	June 13	Cardinals	1–2	Carpenter	**Perez** (2–8)	Isringhausen	24,443	25–40
66	June 14	Cardinals	9–7	**Duke** (5–6)	Ponson	**Gonzalez** (12)	20,289	26–40
67	June 15	Cardinals	5–6	Mulder	**Santos** (4–7)	Isringhausen	18,248	26–41
68	June 16	Twins	2–4	Liriano	**Snell** (7–4)	Nathan	33,025	26–42
69	June 17	Twins	3–5	Crain	**Marte** (0–5)	Nathan	34,085	26–43
70	June 18	Twins	2–8	Santana	**Perez** (2–9)	—	25,104	26–44
71	June 19	Diamondbacks	4–5 (11)	Aquino	**Torres** (2–3)	Julio	15,032	26–45
72	June 20	@ Royals	6–10	Redman	**Wells** (0–1)	—	15,906	26–46
73	June 21	@ Royals	4–6	Dessens	**Torres** (2–4)	Burgos	15,501	26–47
74	June 22	@ Royals	7–15	Elarton	**Maholm** (2–6)	—	13,153	26–48
75	June 23	@ Dodgers	4–10	Tomko	**Perez** (2–10)	—	55,823	26–49
76	June 24	@ Dodgers	0–7	Sele	**Duke** (5–7)	—	47,785	26–50
77	June 25	@ Dodgers	4–7	Penny	**Wells** (0–2)	Saito	55,545	26–51
78	June 27	White Sox	2–4	Buehrle	**Snell** (7–5)	Jenks	24,976	26–52
79	June 28	White Sox	3–4	Garcia	**Maholm** (2–7)	Jenks	23,118	26–53
80	June 29	White Sox	7–6	**Gonzalez** (2–3)	Politte	—	21,380	27–53
81	June 30	Tigers	6–7	Colon	**Wells** (0–3)	Jones	27,318	27–54

**July (13–12)**

#	Date	Opponent	Score	Win	Loss	Save	Attendance	Record
82	July 1	Tigers	9–2	**Capps** (3–1)	Grilli	—	37,111	28–54
83	July 2	Tigers	8–9	Miner	**Snell** (7–6)	Jones	28,136	28–55
84	July 3	@ Mets	11–1	**Maholm** (3–7)	Maine	—	54,111	29–55
85	July 4	@ Mets	6–7	Sanchez	**Hernandez** (0–2)	Wagner	38,487	29–56
86	July 5	@ Mets	0–5	Hernandez	**Wells** (0–4)	—	40,360	29–57
87	July 6	@ Mets	5–7	Trachsel	**Gorzelanny** (0–1)	Wagner	39,743	29–58
88	July 7	@ Phillies	3–2	**Snell** (8–6)	Lieber	**Gonzalez** (13)	45,025	30–58
89	July 8	@ Phillies	2–6	Lidle	**Maholm** (3–8)	—	37,462	30–59
90	July 9	@ Phillies	3–8	Hamels	**Duke** (5–8)	—	32,527	30–60
–	July 11	77th All-Star Game	National League vs. American League (PNC Park, Pittsburgh, Pennsylvania)					
91	July 14	Nationals	7–4	**Duke** (6–8)	Ortiz	**Gonzalez** (14)	26,720	31–60
92	July 15	Nationals	7–6	**Gonzalez** (3–3)	Corcoran	—	32,626	32–60
93	July 16	Nationals	4–8 (11)	Stanton	**Hernandez** (0–3)	—	18,908	32–61
94	July 17	Rockies	3–1	**Grabow** (2–1)	Kim	**Capps** (1)	18,835	33–61
95	July 18	Rockies	4–13	Francis	**Gorzelanny** (0–2)	—	20,086	33–62
96	July 19	Rockies	6–5	**Duke** (7–8)	Jennings	**Gonzalez** (15)	19,881	34–62
97	July 20	@ Marlins	5–3	**Torres** (3–4)	Messenger	**Gonzalez** (16)	9,139	35–62
98	July 21	@ Marlins	1–4	Olsen	**Maholm** (3–9)	Borowski	11,357	35–63
99	July 22	@ Marlins	0–5	Nolasco	**Wells** (0–5)	—	15,291	35–64
100	July 23	@ Marlins	4–5	Borowski	**Gonzalez** (3–4)	—	11,468	35–65
101	July 24	@ Brewers	8–12	Davis	**Duke** (7–9)	—	30,252	35–66
102	July 25	@ Brewers	6–1	**Snell** (9–6)	Bush	—	35,923	36–66
103	July 26	@ Brewers	8–4	**Maholm** (4–9)	Capuano	—	37,678	37–66
104	July 28	Giants	3–0	**Wells** (1–5)	Schmidt	**Gonzalez** (17)	38,092	38–66
105	July 29	Giants	4–3	**Gorzelanny** (1–2)	Wright	**Gonzalez** (18)	38,373	39–66
106	July 30	Giants	2–1 (10)	**Grabow** (3–1)	Kline	—	26,516	40–66

**August (13–15)**

#	Date	Opponent	Score	Win	Loss	Save	Attendance	Record
107	August 1	Braves	2–4	Smoltz	**Snell** (9–7)	Wickman	22,145	40–67
108	August 2	Braves	2–3	Yates	**Torres** (3–5)	Wickman	21,064	40–68
109	August 3	Braves	3–2	**Chacon** (1–0)	Hudson	**Gonzalez** (19)	17,324	41–68
110	August 4	@ Cubs	6–0	**Gorzelanny** (2–2)	Zambrano	—	39,973	42–68
111	August 5	@ Cubs	5–7	Prior	**Duke** (7–10)	Dempster	41,007	42–69
112	August 6	@ Cubs	1–6	Hill	**Snell** (9–8)	—	40,320	42–70
113	August 8	@ Astros	1–3	Backe	**Maholm** (4–10)	Lidge	38,856	42–71
114	August 9	@ Astros	1–14	Oswalt	**Chacon** (1–1)	—	31,077	42–72
115	August 10	@ Astros	2–5	Clemens	**Gorzelanny** (2–3)	—	41,476	42–73
116	August 11	Cardinals	7–1	**Duke** (8–10)	Suppan	—	30,516	43–73
117	August 12	Cardinals	3–2	**Snell** (10–8)	Weaver	**Gonzalez** (20)	35,037	44–73
118	August 13	Cardinals	7–0	**Maholm** (5–10)	Marquis	—	27,101	45–73
119	August 14	Brewers	4–2	**Santos** (5–7)	Bush	**Gonzalez** (21)	16,279	46–73
120	August 15	Brewers	3–6	Davis	**Marte** (0–6)	Cordero	17,877	46–74
121	August 16	Brewers	2–5 (13)	Gonzalez	**Marte** (0–7)	Cordero	14,901	46–75
122	August 18	@ Reds	7–3	**Snell** (11–8)	Michalak	—	31,718	47–75
123	August 19	@ Reds	7–14	Franklin	**Torres** (3–6)	—	34,245	47–76
124	August 20	@ Reds	1–5	Harang	**Santos** (5–8)	—	29,935	47–77
125	August 21	@ Braves	0–3	Smoltz	**Duke** (8–11)	Wickman	21,898	47–78
126	August 22	@ Braves	5–3	**Marte** (1–7)	Baez	**Gonzalez** (22)	21,830	48–78
127	August 23	@ Braves	5–4	**Capps** (4–1)	Paronto	**Gonzalez** (23)	23,082	49–78
128	August 24	Astros	5–3	**Maholm** (6–10)	Rodriguez	**Gonzalez** (24)	32,345	50–78
129	August 25	Astros	1–5	Clemens	**Santos** (5–9)	—	37,009	50–79
130	August 26	Astros	4–7	Pettitte	**Duke** (8–12)	Lidge	37,190	50–80
131	August 27	Astros	1–13	Hirsh	**Chacon** (1–2)	—	19,459	50–81
132	August 28	Cubs	11–6	**Snell** (12–8)	Guzman	—	12,666	51–81
133	August 29	Cubs	7–6 (11)	**Capps** (5–1)	Dempster	—	14,618	52–81
134	August 30	Cubs	10–9 (11)	**McLeary** (1–0)	Dempster	—	12,730	53–81

**September (13–14)**

#	Date	Opponent	Score	Win	Loss	Save	Attendance	Record
135	September 1	@ Cardinals	1–3	Carpenter	**Duke** (8–13)	—	42,091	53–82
136	September 2	@ Cardinals	1–0	**Capps** (6–1)	Weaver	**Torres** (1)	41,466	54–82
137	September 3	@ Cardinals	3–6	Reyes	**Snell** (12–9)	—	42,205	54–83
138	September 4	@ Cubs	5–4	**Maholm** (7–10)	Zambrano	**Torres** (2)	37,994	55–83
139	September 5	@ Cubs	6–5	**Grabow** (4–1)	Dempster	**Torres** (3)	31,494	56–83
140	September 6	@ Cubs	2–7	Wuertz	**Grabow** (4–2)	—	32,557	56–84
141	September 7	@ Cubs	7–5	**Bayliss** (1–0)	Eyre	**Torres** (4)	27,105	57–84
142	September 8	@ Reds	1–9	Lohse	**Snell** (12–10)	—	17,631	57–85
143	September 9	@ Reds	7–4	**Capps** (7–1)	Coffey	**Torres** (5)	25,038	58–85
144	September 10	@ Reds	2–4	Arroyo	**Youman** (0–1)	Schoeneweis	20,731	58–86
145	September 11	Brewers	4–3	**Duke** (9–13)	Davis	**Torres** (6)	13,643	59–86
146	September 13	Brewers	6–3	**Snell** (13–10)	Capuano	**Torres** (7)	—	60–86
147	September 13	Brewers	1–2	Sheets	**Chacon** (1–3)	Cordero	11,627	60–87
148	September 15	Mets	5–3	**Maholm** (8–10)	Martinez	**Torres** (8)	24,410	61–87
149	September 16	Mets	3–2	**Capps** (8–1)	Heilman	—	37,623	62–87
150	September 17	Mets	3–0	**Duke** (10–13)	Maine	**Torres** (9)	34,866	63–87
151	September 19	@ Dodgers	10–6	**Snell** (14–10)	Kuo	—	43,734	64–87
152	September 20	@ Dodgers	6–4	**Chacon** (2–3)	Maddux	**Torres** (10)	46,319	65–87
153	September 21	@ Dodgers	2–5	Billingsley	**Youman** (0–2)	Saito	48,567	65–88
154	September 22	@ Padres	2–6	Young	**Gorzelanny** (2–4)	—	40,077	65–89
155	September 23	@ Padres	1–2	Peavy	**Duke** (10–14)	Hoffman	43,168	65–90
156	September 24	@ Padres	1–2	Hensley	**Perez** (2–11)	Hoffman	41,932	65–91
157	September 26	Astros	4–7	Pettitte	**Snell** (14–11)	—	17,141	65–92
158	September 27	Astros	6–7 (15)	Sampson	**Bayliss** (1–1)	Miller	16,352	65–93
159	September 28	Astros	0–3	Oswalt	**Gorzelanny** (2–5)	Lidge	12,671	65–94
160	September 29	Reds	2–5	Harang	**Duke** (10–15)	—	27,033	65–95
161	September 30	Reds	3–0	**McLeary** (2–0)	Arroyo	**Torres** (11)	35,514	66–95

**October (1–0)**

#	Date	Opponent	Score	Win	Loss	Save	Attendance	Record
162	October 1	Reds	1–0	**Capps** (9–1)	Coffey	**Torres** (12)	25,004	67–95

Legend: = Win = Loss
**Bold** = Pirates team member Source: baseball-reference.com

=== Record vs. opponents ===
2006 National League record Source: MLB Standings Grid – 2006
Team	AZ	ATL	CHC	CIN	COL	FLA	HOU	LAD	MIL	NYM	PHI	PIT	SD	SF	STL	WAS	AL
Arizona	—	6–1	4–2	4–2	12–7	2–4	4–5	8–10	3–3	1–6	1–5	5–1	9–10	8–11	4–3	1–5	4–11
Atlanta	1–6	—	6–1	4–3	3–3	11–8	3–4	3–3	2–4	7–11	7–11	3–3	7–2	3–4	4–2	10–8	5–10
Chicago	2–4	1–6	—	10–9	2–4	2–4	7–8	4–2	8–8	3–3	2–5	6–9	0–7	2–4	11–8	2–4	4–11
Cincinnati	2–4	3–4	9–10	—	5–1	4–2	10–5	0–6	9–10	3–4	2–4	9–7	2–4	2–5	9–6	5–1	6-9
Colorado	7–12	3–3	4–2	1–5	—	3–3	4–2	4–15	2–4	1–5	3–4	3–3	10–9	10–8	2–7	8–0	11–4
Florida	4–2	8–11	4–2	2–4	3–3	—	3–4	1–5	7–0	8–11	6–13	5–2	3–3	3–3	1–5	11–7	9–9
Houston	5–4	4–3	8–7	5–10	2–4	4-3	—	3–3	10–5	2–4	2–4	13–3	3–3	1–5	9–7	4–4	7–11
Los Angeles	10–8	3–3	2–4	6–0	15–4	5–1	3–3	—	4–2	3–4	4–3	6–4	5–13	13–6	0–7	4–2	5–10
Milwaukee	3–3	4–2	8–8	10–9	4–2	0–7	5–10	2–4	—	3–3	5–1	7–9	4–3	6–3	7–9	1–5	6–9
New York	6–1	11–7	3–3	4–3	5–1	11–8	4–2	4–3	3–3	—	11–8	5–4	5–2	3–3	4–2	12–6	6–9
Philadelphia	5-1	11–7	5–2	4–2	4–3	13–6	4–2	3–4	1–5	8–11	—	3–3	2–4	5–1	3–3	9–10	5–13
Pittsburgh	1–5	3–3	9–6	7–9	3–3	2–5	3–13	4–6	9–7	4–5	3–3	—	1–5	6–1	6–9	3–3	3–12
San Diego	10–9	2–7	7–0	4–2	9–10	3–3	3–3	13–5	3–4	2–5	4–2	5–1	—	7–12	4–2	5–1	7–8
San Francisco	11–8	4–3	4–2	5–2	8–10	3–3	5–1	6–13	3–6	3–3	1–5	1–6	12–7	—	1–4	1–5	8–7
St. Louis	3–4	2–4	8–11	6–9	7–2	5-1	7–9	7–0	9–7	2–4	3–3	9–6	2–4	4–1	—	4–3	5–10
Washington	5–1	8–10	4–2	1–5	0–8	7-11	4–4	2–4	5–1	6–12	10–9	3–3	1–5	5–1	3–4	—	7–11

=== Detailed records ===
**National League**
Opponent	W	L	WP	RS	RA
**NL East**
Atlanta Braves	3	3	0.500	17	19
Florida Marlins	2	5	0.286	27	38
New York Mets	4	5	0.444	36	35
Philadelphia Phillies	3	3	0.500	15	24
Washington Nationals	3	3	0.500	27	33
Total	15	19	0.441	122	149
**NL Central**
Chicago Cubs	9	6	0.600	80	76
Cincinnati Reds	7	9	0.438	80	85
Houston Astros	3	13	0.188	53	97
Milwaukee Brewers	9	7	0.563	87	61
St. Louis Cardinals	6	9	0.400	58	54
Total	34	44	0.436	358	373
**NL West**
Arizona Diamondbacks	1	5	0.167	24	31
Colorado Rockies	3	3	0.500	31	42
Los Angeles Dodgers	4	6	0.400	50	71
San Diego Padres	1	5	0.167	10	22
San Francisco Giants	6	1	0.857	25	16
Total	15	20	0.429	140	182
**American League**
Chicago White Sox	1	2	0.333	12	14
Cleveland Indians	1	2	0.333	12	13
Detroit Tigers	1	2	0.333	23	18
Kansas City Royals	0	3	0.000	17	31
Minnesota Twins	0	3	0.000	7	17
Total	3	12	0.200	71	93
Season Total	67	95	0.414	691	797

Month	Games	Won	Lost	Win %	RS	RA
April	26	7	19	0.269	101	141
May	27	12	15	0.444	150	123
June	28	8	20	0.286	113	163
July	25	13	12	0.520	119	122
August	28	13	15	0.464	113	141
September	27	13	14	0.481	94	107
October	1	1	0	1.000	1	0
Total	162	67	95	0.414	691	797

	Games	Won	Lost	Win %	RS	RA
Home	81	43	38	0.531	380	367
Away	81	24	57	0.296	311	430
Total	162	67	95	0.414	691	797

== Roster ==
2006 Pittsburgh Pirates
Roster
Pitchers: 54 Jonah Bayliss; 55 Matt Capps; 32 Shawn Chacón; 57 Zach Duke; 51 Mike Gonzalez; 50 Tom Gorzelanny; 39,34 John Grabow; 34 Roberto Hernández; 28 Paul Maholm; 43 Damaso Marte; 49 Marty McLeary; 36 Juan Pérez; 48 Óliver Pérez; 56 Britt Reames; 59 Brian Rogers; 52 Víctor Santos; 44 Josh Sharpless; 53,45 Ian Snell; 16 Salomón Torres; 22 Ryan Vogelsong; 32 Kip Wells; 27 Shane Youman	Catchers: 11 Humberto Cota; 25 Carlos Maldonado; 26 Ronny Paulino; Infielders: 25 Sean Casey; 14 José Castillo; 37 Yurendell DeCaster; 41 Ryan Doumit; 53 Mike Edwards; 18 José Hernández; 22 Xavier Nady; 5 Joe Randa; 12 Freddy Sanchez; 36 Craig Wilson; 2 Jack Wilson	Outfielders: 19 José Bautista; 38 Jason Bay; 3 Jeromy Burnitz; 10 Rajai Davis; 6 Chris Duffy; 49 Nate McLouth	Manager: 23 Jim Tracy; Coaches: 48 Jim Colborn (pitching); 45 Jeff Cox (third base); 17 Bobby Cuellar (bullpen); 15 Jim Lett (bench); 30 Jeff Manto (hitting); 31 John Shelby (first base)

=== Opening Day lineup ===
Opening Day Starters
Name	Position
Chris Duffy	CF
Jack Wilson	SS
Sean Casey	1B
Jason Bay	LF
Joe Randa	3B
Jeromy Burnitz	RF
José Castillo	2B
Humberto Cota	C
Óliver Pérez	SP

== All-Star game ==
The 2006 Major League Baseball All-Star Game was the 77th playing of the midseason exhibition baseball game between the all-stars of the American League (AL) and National League (NL), the two leagues comprising Major League Baseball. The game was held on July 11, 2006 at PNC Park in Pittsburgh, Pennsylvania, the home of the Pittsburgh Pirates of the National League. The contest was the fifth hosted by the city of Pittsburgh. The game resulted in the American League defeating the National League 3-2, thus awarding the AL champion (which was eventually the Detroit Tigers) home-field advantage in the 2006 World Series.

== Statistics ==
Hitting

Note: G = Games played; AB = At bats; H = Hits; Avg. = Batting average; HR = Home runs; RBI = Runs batted in

Regular season
Player	G	AB	H	Avg.	HR	RBI
S. Youman	5	7	3	0.429	0	1
F. Sanchez	157	582	200	0.344	6	85
R. Vogelsong	18	3	1	0.333	0	0
R. Paulino	129	442	137	0.310	6	55
X. Nady	55	203	61	0.300	3	23
S. Casey	59	213	63	0.296	3	29
J. Bay	159	570	163	0.286	35	109
J. Wilson	142	543	148	0.273	8	35
J. Randa	89	206	55	0.267	4	28
J. Hernández	67	120	32	0.267	2	12
C. Wilson	85	255	68	0.267	13	41
C. Duffy	84	314	80	0.255	2	18
J. Castillo	148	518	131	0.253	14	65
J. Bautista	117	400	94	0.235	16	51
N. McLouth	106	270	63	0.233	7	16
J. Burnitz	111	313	72	0.230	16	49
R. Doumit	61	149	31	0.208	6	17
S. Torres	91	5	1	0.200	0	0
Z. Duke	33	68	13	0.191	0	7
H. Cota	38	100	19	0.190	0	5
M. Edwards	14	16	3	0.188	0	0
V. Santos	25	38	6	0.158	0	1
R. Davis	20	14	2	0.143	0	0
Ó. Pérez	16	25	3	0.120	0	3
P. Maholm	28	55	6	0.109	0	2
C. Maldonado	8	19	2	0.105	0	0
K. Wells	6	11	1	0.091	0	0
S. Chacón	9	13	1	0.077	0	1
I. Snell	35	54	3	0.056	0	2
M. Capps	82	2	0	0.000	0	0
Y. DeCaster	3	2	0	0.000	0	0
M. Gonzalez	51	1	0	0.000	0	0
T. Gorzelanny	11	19	0	0.000	0	1
J. Grabow	68	1	0	0.000	0	0
D. Marte	72	2	0	0.000	0	0
M. McLeary	5	5	0	0.000	0	0
J. Bayliss	11	0	0	—	0	0
R. Hernández	43	0	0	—	0	0
J. Pérez	7	0	0	—	0	0
B. Reames	6	0	0	—	0	0
B. Rogers	10	0	0	—	0	0
J. Sharpless	14	0	0	—	0	0
Team totals	162	5,558	1,462	0.263	141	656

Pitching

Note: G = Games pitched; IP = Innings pitched; W = Wins; L = Losses; ERA = Earned run average; SO = Strikeouts

Regular season
Player	G	IP	W	L	ERA	SO
J. Pérez	7	3 1/3	0	1	8.10	3
B. Reames	6	7 1/3	0	0	9.82	6
B. Rogers	10	8 2/3	0	0	8.31	7
V. Santos	25	115 1/3	5	9	5.70	81
K. Wells	7	36 1/3	1	5	6.69	16
Z. Duke	34	215 1/3	10	15	4.47	117
R. Vogelsong	20	38	0	0	6.39	27
Ó. Pérez	15	76	2	10	6.63	61
P. Maholm	30	176	8	10	4.76	117
I. Snell	32	186	14	11	4.74	169
S. Torres	94	93 1/3	3	6	3.28	72
S. Chacón	9	46	2	3	5.48	27
M. Capps	85	80 2/3	9	1	3.79	56
R. Hernández	46	43	0	3	2.93	33
J. Grabow	72	69 2/3	4	2	4.13	66
M. McLeary	5	17 2/3	2	0	2.04	8
D. Marte	75	58 1/3	1	7	3.70	63
J. Bayliss	11	14 2/3	1	1	4.30	15
T. Gorzelanny	11	61 2/3	2	5	3.79	40
M. Gonzalez	54	54	3	4	2.17	64
S. Youman	5	21 2/3	0	2	2.91	5
J. Sharpless	14	12	0	0	1.50	7
Team totals	162	1,435	67	95	4.52	1,060

== Awards and honors ==
2006 Major League Baseball All-Star Game

- Jason Bay, RF, starter
- Freddy Sanchez, 3B, reserve

NL Batting Champion

- Freddy Sanchez

== Transactions ==
- July 31, 2006: Xavier Nady was traded by the New York Mets to the Pittsburgh Pirates for Roberto Hernandez and Óliver Pérez.

== Farm system ==
Level	Team	League	Manager
AAA	Indianapolis Indians	International League	Trent Jewett
AA	Altoona Curve	Eastern League	Tim Leiper
A	Lynchburg Hillcats	Carolina League	Gary Green
A	Hickory Crawdads	South Atlantic League	Jeff Branson
A-Short Season	Williamsport Crosscutters	New York–Penn League	Tom Prince
Rookie	GCL Pirates	Gulf Coast League	Jeff Livesey
