= 2006 Milwaukee Brewers season =

2006 Milwaukee Brewers
- League: National League
- Division: Central
- Ballpark: Miller Park
- City: Milwaukee
- Record: 75–87 (.463)
- Divisional place: 4th
- Owners: Mark Attanasio
- General managers: Doug Melvin
- Managers: Ned Yost
- Television: FSN Wisconsin (Daron Sutton, Bill Schroeder)
- Radio: WTMJ (AM) (Bob Uecker, Jim Powell)

The 2006 Milwaukee Brewers season was the 37th season for the Brewers in Milwaukee, the ninth in the National League, and 38th overall. They finished the season in fourth place in the National League Central and did not make the playoffs.

== Offseason ==
- December 7, 2005: Lyle Overbay was traded by the Milwaukee Brewers with Ty Taubenheim to the Toronto Blue Jays for David Bush, Gabe Gross, and Zach Jackson.
- January 6, 2006: Russell Branyan was released by the Milwaukee Brewers.

== Regular season ==
=== Season standings ===
==== National League Central ====
NL Central
Team	W	L	Pct.	GB	Home	Road
St. Louis Cardinals	83	78	.516	—	49‍–‍31	34‍–‍47
Houston Astros	82	80	.506	1½	44‍–‍37	38‍–‍43
Cincinnati Reds	80	82	.494	3½	42‍–‍39	38‍–‍43
Milwaukee Brewers	75	87	.463	8½	48‍–‍33	27‍–‍54
Pittsburgh Pirates	67	95	.414	16½	43‍–‍38	24‍–‍57
Chicago Cubs	66	96	.407	17½	36‍–‍45	30‍–‍51

==== Record vs. opponents ====
2006 National League record Source: MLB Standings Grid – 2006
Team	AZ	ATL	CHC	CIN	COL	FLA	HOU	LAD	MIL	NYM	PHI	PIT	SD	SF	STL	WAS	AL
Arizona	—	6–1	4–2	4–2	12–7	2–4	4–5	8–10	3–3	1–6	1–5	5–1	9–10	8–11	4–3	1–5	4–11
Atlanta	1–6	—	6–1	4–3	3–3	11–8	3–4	3–3	2–4	7–11	7–11	3–3	7–2	3–4	4–2	10–8	5–10
Chicago	2–4	1–6	—	10–9	2–4	2–4	7–8	4–2	8–8	3–3	2–5	6–9	0–7	2–4	11–8	2–4	4–11
Cincinnati	2–4	3–4	9–10	—	5–1	4–2	10–5	0–6	9–10	3–4	2–4	9–7	2–4	2–5	9–6	5–1	6-9
Colorado	7–12	3–3	4–2	1–5	—	3–3	4–2	4–15	2–4	1–5	3–4	3–3	10–9	10–8	2–7	8–0	11–4
Florida	4–2	8–11	4–2	2–4	3–3	—	3–4	1–5	7–0	8–11	6–13	5–2	3–3	3–3	1–5	11–7	9–9
Houston	5–4	4–3	8–7	5–10	2–4	4-3	—	3–3	10–5	2–4	2–4	13–3	3–3	1–5	9–7	4–4	7–11
Los Angeles	10–8	3–3	2–4	6–0	15–4	5–1	3–3	—	4–2	3–4	4–3	6–4	5–13	13–6	0–7	4–2	5–10
Milwaukee	3–3	4–2	8–8	10–9	4–2	0–7	5–10	2–4	—	3–3	5–1	7–9	4–3	6–3	7–9	1–5	6–9
New York	6–1	11–7	3–3	4–3	5–1	11–8	4–2	4–3	3–3	—	11–8	5–4	5–2	3–3	4–2	12–6	6–9
Philadelphia	5-1	11–7	5–2	4–2	4–3	13–6	4–2	3–4	1–5	8–11	—	3–3	2–4	5–1	3–3	9–10	5–13
Pittsburgh	1–5	3–3	9–6	7–9	3–3	2–5	3–13	4–6	9–7	4–5	3–3	—	1–5	6–1	6–9	3–3	3–12
San Diego	10–9	2–7	7–0	4–2	9–10	3–3	3–3	13–5	3–4	2–5	4–2	5–1	—	7–12	4–2	5–1	7–8
San Francisco	11–8	4–3	4–2	5–2	8–10	3–3	5–1	6–13	3–6	3–3	1–5	1–6	12–7	—	1–4	1–5	8–7
St. Louis	3–4	2–4	8–11	6–9	7–2	5-1	7–9	7–0	9–7	2–4	3–3	9–6	2–4	4–1	—	4–3	5–10
Washington	5–1	8–10	4–2	1–5	0–8	7-11	4–4	2–4	5–1	6–12	10–9	3–3	1–5	5–1	3–4	—	7–11

=== Notable transactions ===
- July 28, 2006: Carlos Lee was traded by the Milwaukee Brewers with Nelson Cruz to the Texas Rangers for Laynce Nix, Kevin Mench, Francisco Cordero, and Julian Cordero (minors).
- July 28, 2006: David Bell was traded by the Philadelphia Phillies to the Milwaukee Brewers for Wilfrido Laureano (minors).

=== Roster ===
2006 Milwaukee Brewers
Roster
Pitchers: 46 Mike Adams; 31 Dave Bush; 52 José Capellán; 39 Chris Capuano; 48 Francisco Cordero; 49 Doug Davis; 48 Jorge de la Rosa; 58 Chris Demaria; 37 Dana Eveland; 50 Jared Fernández; 32 Geremi González; 30 Rick Helling; 40 Ben Hendrickson; 13 Zach Jackson; 41 Dan Kolb; 43 Justin Lehr; 53 Chris Mabeus; 55 Tomo Ohka; 45 Dennis Sarfate; 15 Ben Sheets; 51 Brian Shouse; 46 Allan Simpson; 50 Chris Spurling; 59 Derrick Turnbow; 33 Carlos Villanueva; 57 Joe Winkelsas; 38 Matt Wise	Catchers: 26 Damian Miller; 21 Chad Moeller; 11 Mike Rivera; Infielders: 12 Chris Barnwell; 25 David Bell; 6 Jeff Cirillo; 28 Prince Fielder; 9 Tony Graffanino; 2 Bill Hall; 7 J. J. Hardy; 47 Corey Koskie; 8 Vinny Rottino; 23 Rickie Weeks	Outfielders: 21 Drew Anderson; 27 Brady Clark; 18 Gabe Gross; 22 Tony Gwynn Jr.; 1 Corey Hart; 5 Geoff Jenkins; 45 Carlos Lee; 24 Kevin Mench; 20 Laynce Nix	Manager: 3 Ned Yost; Coaches: 35 Bill Castro (Bullpen); 36 Mike Maddux (pitching); 14 Dave Nelson (first base); 29 Dale Sveum (third base); 16 Butch Wynegar (hitting); 19 Robin Yount (bench)

== Game log ==
2006 game log
April (14-11)

#	Date	Opponent	Score	Win	Loss	Save	Attendance	Record
1	April 3	Pittsburgh Pirates	5-2	Lehr (1–0)	Torres (0–1)	Turnbow (1)	45,023	1-0
2	April 4	Pittsburgh Pirates	7-5	Capuano (1-0)	Santos (0-1)	Turnbow (2)	15,515	2-0
3	April 5	Pittsburgh Pirates	3-2	Wise (1-0)	Marte (0-1)	Turnbow (3)	15,430	3-0
4	April 7	Arizona Diamondbacks	3-1	Bush (1-0)	Ortiz (0-1)	Turnbow (4)	25,737	4-0
5	April 8	Arizona Diamondbacks	5-4	Kolb (1-0)	Vizcaíno (0-1)		29,226	5-0
6	April 9	Arizona Diamondbacks	0-7	Vargas (1-0)	Capuano (1-1)		28,115	5-1
7	April 10	@ St. Louis Cardinals	4-6	Mulder (1-0)	Ohka (0-1)	Isringhausen (3)	41,936	5-2
8	April 12	@ St. Louis Cardinals	3-5	Marquis (2-0)	Bush (1-1)		40,648	5-3
9	April 13	@ St. Louis Cardinals	4-3 (11)	de la Rosa (1-0)	Isringhausen (0-2)	Turnbow (5)	40,222	6-3
10	April 14	@ New York Mets	3-4	Glavine (2-0)	Capuano (1-2)	Wagner (3)	37,489	6-4
11	April 15	@ New York Mets	8-2	Ohka (1-1)	Trachsel (1-1)		55,830	7-4
12	April 16	@ New York Mets	3-9	Bannister (2-0)	Sheets (0-1)		38,119	7-5
13	April 17	@ Houston Astros	7-8	Astacio (1-0)	Wise (1-1)	Lidge (4)	26,093	7-6
14	April 18	@ Houston Astros	12-13	Oswalt (3-0)	Davis (0-1)	Lidge (5)	27,994	7-7
15	April 19	@ Houston Astros	7-2	Capuano (2-2)	Pettitte (1-3)		27,002	8-7
16	April 20	Cincinnati Reds	8-12	Belisle (1-0)	Lehr (1-1)		15,347	8-8
17	April 21	Cincinnati Reds	1-3	Arroyo (3-0)	Sheets (0-2)	Weathers (4)	29,825	8-9
18	April 22	Cincinnati Reds	11-0	Bush (2-1)	Claussen (1-2)		35,768	9-9
19	April 23	Cincinnati Reds	0-11	Harang (3-1)	Davis (0-2)		29,174	9-10
20	April 24	Atlanta Braves	3-2	Capuano (3-2)	Davies (1-2)	Turnbow (6)	11,660	10-10
21	April 25	Atlanta Braves	4-2	Ohka (2-1)	Hudson (1-2)	Turnbow (7)	16,276	11-10
22	April 26	Atlanta Braves	5-4	Sheets (1-2)	Sosa (0-4)	Turnbow (8)	18,511	12-10
23	April 28	@ Chicago Cubs	2-6	Maddux (5-0)	Bush (2-2)		39,522	12-11
24	April 29	@ Chicago Cubs	16-2	Davis (1-2)	Rusch (1-4)		40,644	13-11
25	April 30	@ Chicago Cubs	9-0	Capuano (4-2)	Zambrano (0-2)		39,229	14-11

May (12-16)

#	Date	Opponent	Score	Win	Loss	Save	Attendance	Record
26	May 1	Houston Astros	4-2	Wise (2-1)	Wheeler (0-1)	Turnbow (9)	12,258	15-11
27	May 2	Houston Astros	5-8	Nieve (1-0)	Sheets (1-3)	Lidge (9)	12,664	15-12
28	May 3	San Francisco	0-2	Schmidt (2-2)	Bush (2-3)		17,358	15-13
29	May 4	San Francisco	7-4	Davis (2-2)	Hennessey (2-1)	Turnbow (10)	21,038	16-13
30	May 5	@ Los Angeles Dodgers	3-4	Báez (1-1)	Wise (2-2)		47,731	16-14
31	May 6	@ Los Angeles Dodgers	4-5	Báez (1-2)	Demaria (0-1)		46,087	16-15
32	May 7	@ Los Angeles Dodgers	2-10	Sele (1-0)	Bush (2-4)		53,532	16-16
33	May 9	@ San Diego Padres	5-4 (10)	Kolb (2-0)	Hoffman (0-1)	Turnbow (11)	22,196	17-16
34	May 10	@ San Diego Padres	0-3	Park (2-1)	Capuano (4-3)	Hoffman (6)	20,088	17-17
35	May 11	@ San Diego Padres	5-8	Peavy (3-3)	Hendrickson (0-1)		22,500	17-18
36	May 12	New York Mets	9-6	Bush (3-4)	Lima (0-2)	Turnbow (12)	26,362	18-18
37	May 13	New York Mets	8-9	Bradford (2-1)	Turnbow (0-1)	Wagner (8)	45,150	18-19
38	May 14	New York Mets	6-5 (10)	de la Rosa (2-0)	Bradford (2-2)		28,104	19-19
39	May 16	Philadelphia Phillies	3-2	Turnbow (1-1)	Franklin (1-3)		14,592	20-19
40	May 17	Philadelphia Phillies	8-7	Capellan (1-0)	Rhodes (0-1)		20,874	21-19
41	May 18	Philadelphia Phillies	5-4	Lehr (2-1)	Ryan Madson (4-2)	Turnbow (13)	27,419	22-19
42	May 19	Minnesota Twins	1-7	Liriano (2-0)	Davis (2-3)		28,462	22-20
43	May 20	Minnesota Twins	10-16	Baker (2-4)	Hendrickson (0-2)		43,422	22-21
44	May 21	Minnesota Twins	5-3	Capuano (5-3)	Crain (0-2)	Turnbow (14)	35,180	23-21
45	May 22	@ Cincinnati Reds	5-15	Arroyo (6-2)	Bush (3-5)		16,567	23-22
46	May 23	@ Cincinnati Reds	3-7	Ramírez (2-3)	Eveland (0-1)		16,528	23-23
47	May 24	@ Cincinnati Reds	6-2	Davis (3-3)	Claussen (3-5)		29,065	24-23
48	May 26	@ Philadelphia Phillies	6-5 (10)	Turnbow (2-1)	Gordon (2-2)	Shouse (1)	43,852	25-23
49	May 27	@ Philadelphia Phillies	9-6	Wise (3-2)	Franklin (1-4)	Turnbow (15)	32,089	26-23
50	May 28	@ Philadelphia Phillies	2-6	Madson (5-3)	Eveland (0-2)		35,674	26-24
51	May 29	@ Pittsburgh Pirates	3-14	Duke (3-6)	Davis (3-4)		17,561	26-25
52	May 30	@ Pittsburgh Pirates	1-12	Santos (3-5)	de la Rosa (2-1)		14,300	26-26
53	May 31	@ Pittsburgh Pirates	1-6	Snell (5-3)	Capuano (5-4)		15,434	26-27

June (14-14)

#	Date	Opponent	Score	Win	Loss	Save	Attendance	Record
54	June 1	@ Pittsburgh Pirates	3-4	Grabow (1-1)	Turnbow (2-2)		12,899	26-28
55	June 2	Washington Nationals	4-10	Ortiz (4-4)	Eveland (0-3)		21,476	26-29
56	June 3	Washington Nationals	3-4	Bray (1-0)	Turnbow (2-3)	Cordero (9)	40,392	26-30
57	June 4	Washington Nationals	4-8	Armas (6-3)	de la Rosa (2-2)		21,608	26-31
58	June 5	San Diego Padres	5-2	Capuano (6-4)	Hensley (4-4)	Turnbow (16)	13,611	27-31
59	June 6	San Diego Padres	5-1	Bush (4-5)	Peavy (4-6)		14,722	28-31
60	June 7	San Diego Padres	5-6	Cassidy (4-2)	Wise (3-3)	Hoffman (13)	16,982	28-32
61	June 8	San Diego Padres	4-3 (10)	Turnbow (3-3)	Cassidy (4-3)		20,510	29-32
62	June 9	St. Louis Cardinals	6-10	Hancock (2-2)	Winkelsas (0-1)	Isringhausen (19)	24,490	29-33
63	June 10	St. Louis Cardinals	4-3	Wise (4-3)	Flores (0-1)	Turnbow (17)	36,981	30-33
64	June 11	St. Louis Cardinals	5-7	Hancock (3-2)	Bush (4-6)	Isringhausen (20)	29,122	30-34
65	June 12	@ Cincinnati Reds	6-5	Jackson (1-0)	Mercker (0-1)	Turnbow (18)	19,279	31-34
66	June 13	@ Cincinnati Reds	6-4	Davis (4-4)	Arroyo (8-3)	Turnbow (19)	21,829	32-34
67	June 14	@ Cincinnati Reds	0-3 (11)	Hammond (1-1)	Kolb (2-1)		27,716	32-35
68	June 16	Cleveland Indians	6-4	Capuano (7-4)	Sabathia (5-3)	Turnbow (20)	33,178	33-35
69	June 17	Cleveland Indians	3-2	Capellan (2-0)	Wickman (1-2)		42,069	34-35
70	June 18	Cleveland Indians	6-3	Turnbow (4-3)	Betancourt (0-3)		43,391	35-35
71	June 19	Detroit Tigers	1-3	Bonderman (7-4)	Wise (4-4)	Jones (19)	29,623	35-36
72	June 20	Detroit Tigers	1-10	Miner (3-1)	Helling (0-1)		33,119	35-37
73	June 21	Detroit Tigers	4-3	Capuano (8-4)	Zumaya (3-1)	Turnbow (21)	31,222	36-37
74	June 23	@ Kansas City Royals	7-2	Bush (5-6)	Keppel (0-4)		18,112	37-37
75	June 24	@ Kansas City Royals	5-6	Duckworth (1-1)	Davis (4-5)	Burgos (12)	20,464	37-38
76	June 25	@ Kansas City Royals	0-6	Redman (5-4)	Helling (0-2)	Gobble (1)	14,726	37-39
77	June 26	@ Chicago Cubs	6-0	Capuano (9-4)	Maddux (7-8)		39,698	38-39
78	June 27	@ Chicago Cubs	8-5	Shouse (1-0)	Dempster (1-4)	Turnbow (22)	39,399	39-39
79	June 28	@ Chicago Cubs	3-6	Howry (3-2)	Kolb (2-2)	Dempster (12)	39,321	39-40
80	June 29	@ Chicago Cubs	5-4	González (1-0)	Prior (0-3)	Turnbow (23)	39,144	40-40
81	June 30	@ Minnesota Twins	2-8	Radke (7-7)	Villanueva (0-1)		28,412	40-41

July (10-15)

#	Date	Opponent	Score	Win	Loss	Save	Attendance	Record
82	July 1	@ Minnesota Twins	7-10	Rincón (3-0)	Turnbow (4-4)	Nathan (14)	35,056	40-42
83	July 2	@ Minnesota Twins	0-8	Liriano (9-1)	Jackson (1-1)		35,466	40-43
84	July 3	Cincinnati Reds	8-7	Wise (5-4)	Coffey (3-3)		31,353	41-43
85	July 4	Cincinnati Reds	5-2	Davis (5-5)	Arroyo (9-5)	Shouse (2)	39,280	42-43
86	July 5	Cincinnati Reds	6-5 (13)	González (2-0)	Standridge (1-1)		19,651	43-43
87	July 6	Chicago Cubs	2-0	Capuano (10-4)	Maddux (7-9)		37,326	44-43
88	July 7	Chicago Cubs	2-7	Zambano (8-3)	Jackson (1-2)		41,172	44-44
89	July 8	Chicago Cubs	1-3	Mármol (2-3)	Bush (5-7)	Dempster (14)	42,268	44-45
90	July 9	Chicago Cubs	4-11	Rusch (3-7)	Davis (5-6)		41,528	44-46
91	July 14	@ Arizona Diamondbacks	3-4	Medders (3-2)	Turnbow (4-5)		24,117	44-47
92	July 15	@ Arizona Diamondbacks	1-8	Webb (10-3)	Capuano (10-5)		26,318	44-48
93	July 16	@ Arizona Diamondbacks	10-5	Bush (6-7)	Vargas (7-6)		29,308	45-48
94	July 17	@ San Francisco Giants	10-1	Jackson (2-2)	Schmidt (6-6)		36,738	46-48
95	July 18	@ San Francisco Giants	3-4	Wright (6-8)	González (2-1)	Benítez (12)	37,054	46-49
96	July 19	@ San Francisco Giants	6-7	Wilson (1-2)	Turnbow (4-6)		39,570	46-50
97	July 21	@ Cincinnati Reds	5-6	Majewski (4-3)	Turnbow (4-7)		19,677	46-51
98	July 22	@ Cincinnati Reds	7-8	Coffey (6-4)	González (2-2)	Guardado (10)	41,915	46-52
99	July 23	@ Cincinnati Reds	4-1	Ohka (3-1)	Milton (6-6)	Kolb (1)	22,726	47-52
100	July 24	Pittsburgh Pirates	12-8	Davis (6-6)	Duke (7-9)		30,252	48-52
101	July 25	Pittsburgh Pirates	1-6	Snell (9-6)	Bush (6-8)		35,923	48-53
102	July 26	Pittsburgh Pirates	4-8	Maholm (4-9)	Capuano (10-6)		37,678	48-54
103	July 28	Cincinnati Reds	3-4	Milton (7-6)	Wise (5-5)	Guardado (11)	32,743	48-55
104	July 29	Cincinnati Reds	6-3	González (3-2)	Germano (0-1)	Turnbow (24)	43,000	49-55
105	July 30	Cincinnati Reds	4-3	Sheets (2-3)	Harang (11-7)	Cordero (7)	42,976	50-55
106	July 31	@ Colorado Rockies	2-4	Cook (7-9)	Capuano (10-7)	Fuentes (20)	23,189	50-56

August (12-16)

#	Date	Opponent	Score	Win	Loss	Save	Attendance	Record
107	August 1	@ Colorado Rockies	1-0	Bush (7-8)	Fogg (7-6)	Cordero (8)	22,082	51-56
108	August 2	@ Colorado Rockies	2-8	Kim (7-6)	Ohka (3-2)		24,034	51-57
109	August 4	@ St. Louis Cardinals	4-3	Davis (7-6)	Carpenter (10-6)	Cordero (9)	43,162	52-57
110	August 5	@ St. Louis Cardinals	3-4	Reyes (3-5)	Sheets (2-4)	Isringhausen (29)	43,299	52-58
111	August 6	@ St. Louis Cardinals	1-7	Suppan (9-6)	Capuano (10-8)	Sosa (4)	43,140	52-59
112	August 8	Chicago Cubs	3-6	Mármol (5-5)	Ohka (3-3)	Dempster (22)	36,200	52-60
113	August 9	Chicago Cubs	6-3	Bush (8-8)	Zambrano (12-5)	Cordero (10)	36,012	53-60
114	August 10	Chicago Cubs	8-6	Davis (8-6)	Prior (1-6)	Cordero (11)	41,686	54-60
115	August 11	@ Atlanta Braves	1-2	Smoltz (10-5)	Turnbow (4-8)		31,336	54-61
116	August 12	@ Atlanta Braves	8-5	Sheets (3-4)	Barry (0-1)	Cordero (12)	40,480	55-61
117	August 13	@ Atlanta Braves	4-7	Paronto (1-0)	Wise (5-6)	Wickman (22)	34,718	55-62
118	August 14	@ Pittsburgh Pirates	2-4	Santos (5-7)	Bush (8-9)	Gonzalez (21)	16,279	55-63
119	August 15	@ Pittsburgh Pirates	6-3	Davis (9-6)	Marte (0-6)	Cordero (13)	17,877	56-63
120	August 16	@ Pittsburgh Pirates	5-2 (13)	González (4-2)	Marte (0-7)	Cordero (14)	14,901	57-63
121	August 17	Houston Astros	3-7	Hirsh (1-1)	Sheets (3-5)		30,252	57-64
122	August 18	Houston Astros	3-2	Cordero (8-4)	Lidge (0-4)		30,294	58-64
123	August 19	Houston Astros	6-4	Bush (9-9)	Rodríguez (9-7)	Cordero (15)	42,347	59-64
124	August 20	Houston Astros	1-3	Clemens (5-4)	Davis (9-7)	Wheeler (4)	41,222	59-65
125	August 22	Colorado Rockies	4-1	Capuano (11-8)	Cook (8-12)	Cordero (16)	25,158	60-65
126	August 23	Colorado Rockies	7-1	Sheets (4-5)	Kim (7-9)		35,569	61-65
127	August 24	Colorado Rockies	12-6	Ohka	Fogg (9-8)		35,484	62-65
128	August 25	@ Florida Marlins	5-6	Moehler (7-8)	Bush (9-10)	Borowski (30)	13,447	62-66
129	August 26	@ Florida Marlins	2-7	Willis (9-10)	Davis (9-8)		30,017	62-67
130	August 27	@ Florida Marlins	3-4	Borowski (2-2)	Shouse (1-1)		13,544	62-68
131	August 28	@ Florida Marlins	2-4	Johnson (12-6)	Sheets (4-6)	Borowski (31)	10,226	62-69
132	August 29	@ Florida Marlins	3-10	Qualls (5-3)	Shouse (1-2)		32,981	62-70
133	August 30	@ Houston Astros	0-1	Lidge (1-4)	Capellan (2-1)		35,021	62-71
134	August 31	@ Houston Astros	3-5	Pettitte (13-13)	Davis (9-9)	Lidge (28)	36,438	62-72

September (12-15)

#	Date	Opponent	Score	Win	Loss	Save	Attendance	Record
135	September 1	Florida Marlins	2-3	Sánchez (6-2)	Capuano (11-9)	Borowski (32)	33,334	62-73
136	September 2	Florida Marlins	6-9	Borowski (3-2)	Turnbow (4-9)	Tankersley (3)	44,005	62-74
137	September 3	Florida Marlins	3-10	Olsen (12-7)	Ohka (4-4)		25,058	62-75
138	September 4	Los Angeles Dodgers	3-6	Bush (10-10)	Maddux (12-12)	Cordero (17)	33,645	63-75
139	September 5	Los Angeles Dodgers	9-0	Davis (10-9)	Hendrickson (5-15)		13,427	64-75
140	September 6	Los Angeles Dodgers	1-2	Lowe (14-8)	Capuano (11-10)	Saito (18)	25,106	64-76
141	September 8	Houston Astros	3-4	Oswalt (12-8)	Capellan (2-2)	Lidge (31)	19,677	64-77
142	September 9	Houston Astros	4-10	Hirsh (3-3)	Ohka (4-5)		31,216	64-78
143	September 10	Houston Astros	4-0	Bush (11-10)	Rodríguez (9-9)		23,456	65-78
144	September 11	@ Pittsburgh Pirates	3-4	Duke (9-13)	Davis (10-10)	Torres (6)	13,643	65-79
	September 12	@ Pittsburgh Pirates	Postponed (rain) Rescheduled for September 13 (double header)					
145	September 13	@ Pittsburgh Pirates	3-6	Snell (13-10)	Capuano (11-11)	Torres (7)	?	65-80
146	September 13	@ Pittsburgh Pirates	2-1	Sheets (5-6)	Chacón (6-6)	Cordero (18)	11,627	66-80
147	September 15	@ Washington Nationals	5-2	Villanueva (1-1)	Ortiz (10-14)	Cordero (19)	21,168	67-80
148	September 16	@ Washington Nationals	5-8	Astacio (4-5)	Bush (11-11)	Cordero (27)	24,252	67-81
149	September 17	@ Washington Nationals	1-6	Rivera (3-0)	Davis (10-11)		26,128	67-82
150	September 18	St. Louis Cardinals	4-3	Cordero (9-4)	Looper (9-2)		19,360	68-82
151	September 19	St. Louis Cardinals	2-12	Weaver (7-14)	Sheets (5-7)		15,204	68-83
152	September 20	St. Louis Cardinals	1-0	Cordero (10-4)	Johnson (0-3)		14,242	69-83
153	September 21	San Francisco Giants	9-4	Bush (12-11)	Morris (10-15)		28,719	70-83
154	September 22	San Francisco Giants	13-12	Capellan (3-2)	Chulk (1-3)	Cordero (20)	21,796	71-83
155	September 23	San Francisco Giants	10-8	Capellan (4-2)	Taschner (0-1)	Cordero (21)	33,989	72-83
156	September 24	San Francisco Giants	5-3	Sheets (6-7)	Cain (13-11)	Cordero (22)	23,049	73-83
157	September 26	@ Chicago Cubs	6-14	Marshall (6-9)	Villanueva (1-2)		31,932	73-84
158	September 27	@ Chicago Cubs	2-3	Howry (4-5)	Cordero (10-5)		36,273	73-85
159	September 28	@ St. Louis Cardinals	9-4	Davis (11-11)	Marquis (14-16)		40,313	74-85
160	September 29	@ St. Louis Cardinals	5-10	Weaver (8-14)	Capuano (11-12)		41,718	74-86
161	September 30	@ St. Louis Cardinals	2-3	Johnson (2-4)	Shouse (1-3)	Wainwright (3)	44,294	74-87

October (1-0)

#	Date	Opponent	Score	Win	Loss	Save	Attendance	Record
162	October 1	@ St. Louis Cardinals	5-3	Villanueva (2-2)	Reyes (5-8)		44,133	75-87

== Player stats ==
=== Batting ===
==== Starters by position ====
Note: Pos = Position; G = Games played; AB = At bats; H = Hits; Avg. = Batting average; HR = Home runs; RBI = Runs batted in

Pos	Player	G	AB	H	Avg.	HR	RBI
C	Damian Miller	101	331	83	.251	6	38
1B	Prince Fielder	157	569	154	.271	28	81
2B	Rickie Weeks Jr.	95	359	100	.279	8	34
SS	Bill Hall	148	537	145	.270	35	85
3B	Corey Koskie	76	257	67	.261	12	33
LF	Carlos Lee	102	388	111	.286	28	81
CF	Brady Clark	138	415	109	.263	4	29
RF	Geoff Jenkins	147	484	131	.271	17	70

==== Other batters ====
Note: G = Games played; AB = At bats; H = Hits; Avg. = Batting average; HR = Home runs; RBI = Runs batted in

Player	G	AB	H	Avg.	HR	RBI
Jeff Cirillo	112	263	84	.319	3	23
Corey Hart	87	237	67	.283	9	33
Tony Graffanino	60	236	66	.280	2	27
Gabe Gross	117	208	57	.274	9	38
David Bell	53	180	46	.256	4	29
Mike Rivera	46	142	38	.268	6	24
J.J. Hardy	35	128	31	.242	5	14
Kevin Mench	40	126	29	.230	1	18
Chad Moeller	29	98	18	.184	2	5
Tony Gwynn Jr.	32	77	20	.260	0	4
Laynce Nix	10	35	8	.229	1	6
Chris Barnwell	13	30	2	.067	0	1
Vinny Rottino	9	14	3	.214	0	1
Drew Anderson	9	9	1	.111	0	0

=== Pitching ===
==== Starting pitchers ====
Note: G = Games pitched; IP = Innings pitched; W = Wins; L = Losses; ERA = Earned run average; SO = Strikeouts

Player	G	IP	W	L	ERA	SO
Chris Capuano	34	221.1	11	12	4.03	174
Dave Bush	34	210.0	12	11	4.41	166
Doug Davis	34	203.1	11	11	4.91	159
Ben Sheets	17	106.0	6	7	3.82	116
Tomo Ohka	18	97.0	4	5	4.82	50
Zach Jackson	8	38.1	2	2	5.40	22
Ben Hendrickson	4	12.0	0	2	12.00	8

==== Other pitchers ====
Note: G = Games pitched; IP = Innings pitched; W = Wins; L = Losses; ERA = Earned run average; SO = Strikeouts

Player	G	IP	W	L	ERA	SO
Carlos Villanueva	10	53.2	2	2	3.69	39
Dana Eveland	9	27.2	0	3	8.13	32

==== Relief pitchers ====
Note: G = Games pitched; W = Wins; L = Losses; SV = Saves; ERA = Earned run average; SO = Strikeouts

Player	G	W	L	SV	ERA	SO
Derrick Turnbow	64	4	9	24	6.87	69
José Capellán	61	4	2	0	4.40	58
Brian Shouse	59	1	3	2	3.97	20
Dan Kolb	53	2	2	1	4.84	26
Matt Wise	40	5	6	0	3.86	27
Francisco Cordero	28	3	1	16	1.69	30
Geremi González	21	4	2	0	5.14	36
Rick Helling	20	0	2	0	4.11	32
Jorge De La Rosa	18	2	2	0	8.60	31
Justin Lehr	16	2	1	0	8.62	12
Chris Demaria	10	0	1	0	5.93	11
Dennis Sarfate	8	0	0	0	4.32	11
Chris Spurling	7	0	0	0	7.20	3
Joe Winkelsas	7	0	1	0	7.71	4
Jared Fernández	4	0	0	0	9.95	1
Allan Simpson	2	0	0	0	3.38	5
Mike Adams	2	0	0	0	11.57	1
Chris Mabeus	1	0	0	0	21.60	2

== Farm system ==
The Brewers' farm system consisted of six minor league affiliates in 2006.

Level	Team	League	Manager
Triple-A	Nashville Sounds	Pacific Coast League	Frank Kremblas
Double-A	Huntsville Stars	Southern League	Don Money
Class A-Advanced	Brevard County Manatees	Florida State League	Ramón Avilés
Class A	West Virginia Power	South Atlantic League	Mike Guerrero
Rookie	Helena Brewers	Pioneer League	Ed Sedar
Rookie	AZL Brewers	Arizona League	Charlie Greene
