= 2006 Cincinnati Reds season =

2006 Cincinnati Reds
- League: National League
- Division: Central
- Ballpark: Great American Ball Park
- City: Cincinnati
- Record: 80–82 (.494)
- Divisional place: 3rd
- Owners: Robert Castellini
- General managers: Wayne Krivsky
- Managers: Jerry Narron
- Television: FSN Ohio (George Grande, Chris Welsh)
- Radio: WLW (Marty Brennaman, Steve Stewart, Joe Nuxhall)
- Stats: ESPN.com; Baseball Reference

The 2006 Cincinnati Reds season was the 137th season for the franchise in Major League Baseball, and their fourth season at Great American Ball Park in Cincinnati. It involved the Reds making a bid to win the National League Central, although just falling short, finishing in third place. The Reds had a final record of 80–82 and were managed by Jerry Narron.

== Regular season ==
=== Season summary ===
In the offseason before the season started, the Reds changed their ownership and their general manager. One key pickup was pitcher Bronson Arroyo. The Reds finished in third place in the NL Central division, just 3½ games behind the division winner and eventual World Series champion, the St. Louis Cardinals. The Reds also finished 2 games behind the second place team, the Houston Astros. They finished five games ahead of the fourth place team, the Milwaukee Brewers. They finished thirteen games ahead of the fifth place team, the Pittsburgh Pirates, and fourteen games ahead of the sixth place team, the Chicago Cubs.

Aaron Harang led the team in wins with 16, and National League All-Star Bronson Arroyo was second with 14.

The Reds finished in 12th out of 16 teams in the National League in attendance.

Scott Hatteberg led the team in batting average and on-base percentage, with .289 and .389, respectively. Adam Dunn led the team in slugging percentage, games played, at bats, plate appearances, runs, total bases, home runs, runs batted in, walks, intentional walks, strikeouts, extra-base hits, and times on base. Edwin Encarnación led the team in doubles (with 33) and hit by pitch (13 times). Ryan Freel had more stolen bases and times caught stealing than anyone else on the team, with 37 and 11, respectively.

=== Season standings ===
==== National League Central ====
NL Central
| Team | W | L | Pct. | GB | Home | Road |
|---|---|---|---|---|---|---|
| St. Louis Cardinals | 83 | 78 | .516 | — | 49‍–‍31 | 34‍–‍47 |
| Houston Astros | 82 | 80 | .506 | 1½ | 44‍–‍37 | 38‍–‍43 |
| Cincinnati Reds | 80 | 82 | .494 | 3½ | 42‍–‍39 | 38‍–‍43 |
| Milwaukee Brewers | 75 | 87 | .463 | 8½ | 48‍–‍33 | 27‍–‍54 |
| Pittsburgh Pirates | 67 | 95 | .414 | 16½ | 43‍–‍38 | 24‍–‍57 |
| Chicago Cubs | 66 | 96 | .407 | 17½ | 36‍–‍45 | 30‍–‍51 |

==== Record vs. opponents ====
2006 National League record Source: MLB Standings Grid – 2006
| Team | AZ | ATL | CHC | CIN | COL | FLA | HOU | LAD | MIL | NYM | PHI | PIT | SD | SF | STL | WAS | AL |
|---|---|---|---|---|---|---|---|---|---|---|---|---|---|---|---|---|---|
| Arizona | — | 6–1 | 4–2 | 4–2 | 12–7 | 2–4 | 4–5 | 8–10 | 3–3 | 1–6 | 1–5 | 5–1 | 9–10 | 8–11 | 4–3 | 1–5 | 4–11 |
| Atlanta | 1–6 | — | 6–1 | 4–3 | 3–3 | 11–8 | 3–4 | 3–3 | 2–4 | 7–11 | 7–11 | 3–3 | 7–2 | 3–4 | 4–2 | 10–8 | 5–10 |
| Chicago | 2–4 | 1–6 | — | 10–9 | 2–4 | 2–4 | 7–8 | 4–2 | 8–8 | 3–3 | 2–5 | 6–9 | 0–7 | 2–4 | 11–8 | 2–4 | 4–11 |
| Cincinnati | 2–4 | 3–4 | 9–10 | — | 5–1 | 4–2 | 10–5 | 0–6 | 9–10 | 3–4 | 2–4 | 9–7 | 2–4 | 2–5 | 9–6 | 5–1 | 6-9 |
| Colorado | 7–12 | 3–3 | 4–2 | 1–5 | — | 3–3 | 4–2 | 4–15 | 2–4 | 1–5 | 3–4 | 3–3 | 10–9 | 10–8 | 2–7 | 8–0 | 11–4 |
| Florida | 4–2 | 8–11 | 4–2 | 2–4 | 3–3 | — | 3–4 | 1–5 | 7–0 | 8–11 | 6–13 | 5–2 | 3–3 | 3–3 | 1–5 | 11–7 | 9–9 |
| Houston | 5–4 | 4–3 | 8–7 | 5–10 | 2–4 | 4-3 | — | 3–3 | 10–5 | 2–4 | 2–4 | 13–3 | 3–3 | 1–5 | 9–7 | 4–4 | 7–11 |
| Los Angeles | 10–8 | 3–3 | 2–4 | 6–0 | 15–4 | 5–1 | 3–3 | — | 4–2 | 3–4 | 4–3 | 6–4 | 5–13 | 13–6 | 0–7 | 4–2 | 5–10 |
| Milwaukee | 3–3 | 4–2 | 8–8 | 10–9 | 4–2 | 0–7 | 5–10 | 2–4 | — | 3–3 | 5–1 | 7–9 | 4–3 | 6–3 | 7–9 | 1–5 | 6–9 |
| New York | 6–1 | 11–7 | 3–3 | 4–3 | 5–1 | 11–8 | 4–2 | 4–3 | 3–3 | — | 11–8 | 5–4 | 5–2 | 3–3 | 4–2 | 12–6 | 6–9 |
| Philadelphia | 5-1 | 11–7 | 5–2 | 4–2 | 4–3 | 13–6 | 4–2 | 3–4 | 1–5 | 8–11 | — | 3–3 | 2–4 | 5–1 | 3–3 | 9–10 | 5–13 |
| Pittsburgh | 1–5 | 3–3 | 9–6 | 7–9 | 3–3 | 2–5 | 3–13 | 4–6 | 9–7 | 4–5 | 3–3 | — | 1–5 | 6–1 | 6–9 | 3–3 | 3–12 |
| San Diego | 10–9 | 2–7 | 7–0 | 4–2 | 9–10 | 3–3 | 3–3 | 13–5 | 3–4 | 2–5 | 4–2 | 5–1 | — | 7–12 | 4–2 | 5–1 | 7–8 |
| San Francisco | 11–8 | 4–3 | 4–2 | 5–2 | 8–10 | 3–3 | 5–1 | 6–13 | 3–6 | 3–3 | 1–5 | 1–6 | 12–7 | — | 1–4 | 1–5 | 8–7 |
| St. Louis | 3–4 | 2–4 | 8–11 | 6–9 | 7–2 | 5-1 | 7–9 | 7–0 | 9–7 | 2–4 | 3–3 | 9–6 | 2–4 | 4–1 | — | 4–3 | 5–10 |
| Washington | 5–1 | 8–10 | 4–2 | 1–5 | 0–8 | 7-11 | 4–4 | 2–4 | 5–1 | 6–12 | 10–9 | 3–3 | 1–5 | 5–1 | 3–4 | — | 7–11 |

=== Notable transactions ===
- April 7, 2006: Brandon Phillips was traded by the Cleveland Indians to the Cincinnati Reds for a player to be named later. The Cincinnati Reds sent Jeff Stevens (minors) (June 13, 2006) to the Cleveland Indians to complete the trade.
- July 13, 2006: Felipe López was traded by the Cincinnati Reds with Austin Kearns and Ryan Wagner to the Washington Nationals for Gary Majewski, Royce Clayton, Bill Bray, Brendan Harris, and Daryl Thompson (minors).
- August 9, 2006: Todd Hollandsworth was purchased by the Cincinnati Reds from the Cleveland Indians.

=== Roster ===
2006 Cincinnati Reds roster
Roster
| Pitchers: 61 Bronson Arroyo; 31 Matt Belisle; 45 Bill Bray; 53 Mike Burns; 34 Brandon Claussen; 56 Todd Coffey; 36 Rhéal Cormier; 51 Ryan Franklin; 57 Justin Germano; 48 Mike Gosling; 45,81 Eddie Guardado; 45 Chris Hammond; 39 Aaron Harang; 52 Jason Johnson; 64 Sun-Woo Kim; 28 Kyle Lohse; 38 Gary Majewski; 46 Joe Mays; 50 Kent Mercker; 63 Chris Michalak; 22 Eric Milton; 54 Elizardo Ramírez; 60 Scott Schoeneweis; 37 Brian Shackelford; 35 Jason Standridge; 25 David Weathers; 00 Rick White; 52 Dave Williams; 52 Esteban Yan | Catchers: 23 Jason LaRue; 26 David Ross; 17 Javier Valentín; Infielders: 33 Rich Aurilia; 9 Juan Castro; 2 Royce Clayton; 12 Edwin Encarnación; 57 Brendan Harris; 21 Scott Hatteberg; 2 Felipe López; 62 Ray Olmedo; 4 Brandon Phillips; 15 Tony Womack | Outfielders: 19 Chris Denorfia; 44 Adam Dunn; 6 Ryan Freel; 3 Ken Griffey Jr.; 16 Todd Hollandsworth; 30 Norris Hopper; 28 Austin Kearns; 30 Quinton McCracken; 16 Cody Ross; 00 Brandon Watson; 15 DeWayne Wise; Other batters: 54 Andy Abad | Manager: 41 Jerry Narron; Coaches: 55 Mark Berry (third base); 49 Chris Chambliss (hitting); 7 Bucky Dent (bench); 47 Tom Hume (bullpen); 32 Billy Hatcher (first base); 58 Vern Ruhle (pitching) |

=== Game log ===
2006 game log
April

| # | Date | Opponent | Score | Win | Loss | Save | Attendance | Record |
|---|---|---|---|---|---|---|---|---|
| 1 | April 3 | Cubs | 16–7 | Ohman (1–0) | Harang (0–1) | | 42,591 | 0–1 |
| 2 | April 5 | Cubs | 8–6 | Arroyo (1–0) | Rusch (0–1) | Weathers (1) | 27,287 | 1–1 |
| 3 | April 6 | Pirates | 6–5 | White (1–0) | González (0–1) | Weathers (2) | 13,887 | 2–1 |
| 4 | April 7 | Pirates | 7–6 | Milton (1–0) | Maholm (0–1) | Mercker (1) | 16,573 | 3–1 |
| 5 | April 8 | Pirates | 11–9 | Harang (1–1) | Pérez (0–1) | White (1) | 20,244 | 4–1 |
| 6 | April 9 | Pirates | 5–3 | Santos (1–1) | Williams (0–1) | Hernández (1) | 22,090 | 4–2 |
| 7 | April 11 | @ Cubs | 9–2 | Arroyo (2–0) | Rusch (0–2) | | 36,708 | 5–2 |
| 8 | April 12 | @ Cubs | 4–1 | Maddux (2–0) | Claussen (0–1) | Dempster (2) | 37,252 | 5–3 |
| 9 | April 13 | @ Cubs | 8–3 | Milton (2–0) | Zambrano (0–1) | | 40,881 | 6–3 |
| 10 | April 14 | @ Cardinals | 1–0 | Harang (2–1) | Carpenter (1–1) | Weathers (3) | 40,901 | 7–3 |
| 11 | April 15 | @ Cardinals | 9–3 | Ponson (1–0) | Williams (0–2) | | 40,752 | 7–4 |
| 12 | April 16 | @ Cardinals | 8–7 | Looper (1–0) | Weathers (0–1) | | 40,068 | 7–5 |
| 13 | April 17 | Marlins | 9–1 | Claussen (1–1) | Moehler (0–3) | | 16,960 | 8–5 |
| 14 | April 18 | Marlins | 12–6 | Johnson (1–1) | Milton (2–1) | | 19,724 | 8–6 |
| 15 | April 19 | Marlins | 9–8 | Coffey (1–0) | Wellemeyer (0–1) | | 18,881 | 9–6 |
| 16 | April 20 | @ Brewers | 12–8 | Belisle (1–0) | Lehr (1–1) | | 15,347 | 10–6 |
| 17 | April 21 | @ Brewers | 3–1 | Arroyo (3–0) | Sheets (0–2) | Weathers (4) | 29,825 | 11–6 |
| 18 | April 22 | @ Brewers | 11–0 | Bush (2–1) | Claussen (1–2) | | 35,768 | 11–7 |
| 19 | April 23 | @ Brewers | 11–0 | Harang (3–1) | Davis (0–2) | | 29,174 | 12–7 |
| 20 | April 24 | @ Nationals | 4–2 | Ramírez (1–0) | Hernández (1–3) | Weathers (5) | 19,264 | 13–7 |
| 21 | April 25 | @ Nationals | 6–5 | Williams (1–2) | Traber (1–1) | Weathers (6) | 21,642 | 14–7 |
| 22 | April 26 | @ Nationals | 5–0 | Arroyo (4–0) | Ortiz (0–3) | | 19,380 | 15–7 |
| 23 | April 28 | Astros | 5–4 | Claussen (2–2) | Oswalt (4–1) | Weathers (7) | 32,089 | 16–7 |
| 24 | April 29 | Astros | 6–3 | Harang (4–1) | Pettitte (1–4) | Weathers (8) | 24,873 | 17–7 |
| 25 | April 30 | Astros | 3–2 | Buchholz (2–1) | Ramírez (1–1) | Lidge (8) | 22,814 | 17–8 |

May

| # | Date | Opponent | Score | Win | Loss | Save | Attendance | Record |
|---|---|---|---|---|---|---|---|---|
| 26 | May 1 | Cardinals | 6–1 | Arroyo (5–0) | Mulder (2–1) | | 20,900 | 18–8 |
| 27 | May 2 | Cardinals | 3–2 | Coffey (2–0) | Falkenborg (0–1) | | 25,127 | 19–8 |
| 28 | May 3 | @ Rockies | 3–0 | Francis (1–2) | Claussen (2–3) | Fuentes (6) | 18,214 | 19–9 |
| 29 | May 4 | @ Rockies | 7–1 | Harang (5–1) | Fogg (2–2) | | 18,204 | 20–9 |
| 30 | May 5 | @ D-backs | 7–1 | Webb (5–0) | Ramírez (1–1) | | 21,077 | 20–10 |
| 31 | May 6 | @ D-backs | 3–1 | Vargas (4–1) | Arroyo (5–1) | Valverde (9) | 27,204 | 20–11 |
| 32 | May 7 | @ D-backs | 9–8 | Williams (2–2) | Hernández (5–4) | Weathers (9) | 27,727 | 21–11 |
| 33 | May 9 | Nationals | 7–1 | Armas (3–0) | Claussen (2–4) | | 16,716 | 21–12 |
| 34 | May 10 | Nationals | 9–6 | Weathers (1–1) | Stanton (1–4) | | 14,180 | 22–12 |
| 35 | May 11 | Nationals | 5–4 | Schackelford (1–0) | Eischen (0–1) | | 15,771 | 23–12 |
| 36 | May 12 | Phillies | 8–4 | Madson (4–1) | Ramírez (1–3) | Gordon (11) | 21,709 | 23–13 |
| 37 | May 13 | Phillies | 2–0 | Lieber (3–4) | Williams (2–3) | Gordon (12) | 32,620 | 23–14 |
| 38 | May 14 | Phillies | 2–1 | Geary (1–0) | Hammond (0–1) | Gordon (13) | 19,673 | 23–15 |
| 39 | May 16 | @ Pirates | 9–3 | Maholm (2–4) | Harang (5–2) | | 14,315 | 23–16 |
| 40 | May 17 | @ Pirates | 7–2 | Pérez (2–5) | Arroyo (5–2) | | 14,897 | 23–17 |
| 41 | May 18 | @ Pirates | 9–8 | Belisle (2–0) | Capps (1–1) | Coffey (1) | 18,502 | 24–17 |
| 42 | May 19 | @ Tigers | 9–4 | Claussen (3–4) | Bonderman (4–3) | | 26,933 | 25–17 |
| 43 | May 20 | @ Tigers | 7–6 | Rodney (2–1) | Weathers (1–2) | | 43,128 | 25–18 |
| 44 | May 21 | @ Tigers | 1–0 | Rodney (3–1) | Harang (5–3) | Jones (13) | 31,515 | 25–19 |
| 45 | May 22 | Brewers | 15–5 | Arroyo (6–2) | Bush (3–5) | | 16,567 | 26–19 |
| 46 | May 23 | Brewers | 7–3 | Ramírez (2–3) | Eveland (0–1) | | 16,528 | 27–19 |
| 47 | May 24 | Brewers | 6–2 | Davis (3–3) | Claussen (3–5) | | 29,065 | 27–20 |
| 48 | May 26 | D-backs | 3–0 | Webb (8–0) | Milton (2–2) | | 33,751 | 27–21 |
| 49 | May 27 | D-backs | 7–0 | Cruz (2–3) | Harang (5–4) | | 36,884 | 27–22 |
| 50 | May 28 | D-backs | 5–4 | Weathers (2–2) | Valverde (2–2) | | 27,694 | 28–22 |
| 51 | May 29 | @ Cubs | 7–3 | Wood (1–1) | Ramírez (2–4) | Dempster (9) | 40,072 | 28–23 |
| 52 | May 30 | @ Cubs | 8–3 | Maddux (6–4) | Claussen (3–6) | | 39,000 | 28–24 |
| 53 | May 31 | @ Cubs | 3–2 | Milton (3–2) | Zambrano (3–3) | Coffey (2) | 39,810 | 29–24 |

June

| # | Date | Opponent | Score | Win | Loss | Save | Attendance | Record |
|---|---|---|---|---|---|---|---|---|
| 54 | June 2 | @ Astros | 14–3 | Harang (6–4) | Rodríguez (6–3) | | 37,086 | 30–24 |
| 55 | June 3 | @ Astros | 7–5 | Arroyo (7–2) | Pettitte (4–7) | | 39,653 | 31–24 |
| 56 | June 4 | @ Astros | 6–4 | Coffey (3–0) | Wheeler (0–4) | Yan (1) | 37,532 | 32–24 |
| 57 | June 5 | @ Cardinals | 8–7 | Yan (1–0) | Isringhausen (1–3) | Coffey (3) | 43,707 | 33–24 |
| 58 | June 6 | @ Cardinals | 7–0 | Milton (4–2) | Carpenter (4–3) | | 43,857 | 34–24 |
| 59 | June 7 | @ Cardinals | 7–4 | Harang (7–4) | Ponson (4–1) | Coffey (4) | 44,306 | 35–24 |
| 60 | June 8 | Cubs | 7–1 | Arroyo (8–2) | Rusch (2–6) | | 26,059 | 36–24 |
| 61 | June 9 | Cubs | 6–5 | Maddux (7–5) | Ramírez (2–5) | Dempster (10) | 41,064 | 36–25 |
| 62 | June 10 | Cubs | 4–2 | Zambrano (5–3) | Claussen (3–7) | Dempster (11) | 34,141 | 36–26 |
| 63 | June 11 | Cubs | 9–3 | Mármol (1–0) | Milton (4–3) | | 27,250 | 36–27 |
| 64 | June 12 | Brewers | 6–5 | Jackson (1–0) | Mercker (0–1) | Turnbow (18) | 19,279 | 36–28 |
| 65 | June 13 | Brewers | 6–4 | Davis (4–4) | Arroyo (8–3) | Turnbow (19) | 21,829 | 36–29 |
| 66 | June 14 | Brewers | 3–0 | Hammond (1–1) | Kolb (2–1) | | 27,716 | 37–29 |
| 67 | June 16 | White Sox | 12–4 | García (8–4) | Claussen (3–8) | | 32,673 | 37–30 |
| 68 | June 17 | White Sox | 8–6 | Thornton (2–1) | Coffey (3–1) | Jenks (20) | 39,451 | 37–31 |
| 69 | June 18 | White Sox | 8–1 | Garland (6–3) | Harang (7–5) | | 31,569 | 37–32 |
| 70 | June 19 | @ Mets | 4–2 | Arroyo (9–3) | Hernández (4–6) | | 41,874 | 38–32 |
| 71 | June 20 | @ Mets | 9–2 | Trachsel (5–4) | Ramírez (2–6) | | 38,991 | 38–33 |
| 72 | June 21 | @ Mets | 6–5 | Standridge (1–0) | Wagner (3–1) | Coffey (5) | 49,758 | 39–33 |
| 73 | June 22 | @ Mets | 6–2 | Martínez (7–3) | Milton (4–4) | Bradford (2) | 46,767 | 39–34 |
| 74 | June 23 | @ Indians | 3–0 | Harang (8–5) | Westbrook (6–4) | | 32,927 | 40–34 |
| 75 | June 24 | @ Indians | 4–0 | Byrd (6–5) | Arroyo (9–4) | | 33,072 | 40–35 |
| 76 | June 25 | @ Indians | 4–2 | Ramírez (3–6) | Sowers (0–1) | Coffey (6) | 33,139 | 41–35 |
| 77 | June 27 | Royals | 9–8 | Affeldt (3–5) | Coffey (3–2) | Burgos (13) | 21,420 | 41–36 |
| 78 | June 28 | Royals | 7–2 | Harang (9–5) | Elarton (3–9) | | 34,648 | 42–36 |
| 79 | June 29 | Royals | 6–5 | Weathers (3–2) | Dessens (4–7) | Coffey (7) | 22,093 | 43–36 |
| 80 | June 30 | Indians | 9–8 | Mercker (1–1) | Wickman (1–4) | | 34,930 | 44–36 |

July

| # | Date | Opponent | Score | Win | Loss | Save | Attendance | Record |
|---|---|---|---|---|---|---|---|---|
| 81 | July 1 | Indians | 12–7 | Lee (8–5) | Mays (0–1) | | 40,692 | 44–37 |
| 82 | July 2 | Indians | 6–3 | Mota (1–3) | Weathers (3–3) | Wickman (12) | 36,849 | 44–38 |
| 83 | July 3 | @ Brewers | 8–7 | Wise (5–4) | Coffey (3–3) | | 31,353 | 44–39 |
| 84 | July 4 | @ Brewers | 5–2 | Davis (5–5) | Arroyo (9–5) | Shouse (2) | 39,280 | 44–40 |
| 85 | July 5 | @ Brewers | 6–5 | González (2–0) | Standridge (1–1) | | 19,651 | 44–41 |
| 86 | July 6 | @ Braves | 8–7 | Ray (1–0) | Coffey (3–3) | | 28,446 | 44–42 |
| 87 | July 7 | @ Braves | 10–5 | Milton (5–4) | Ramírez (4–3) | | 32,315 | 45–42 |
| 88 | July 8 | @ Braves | 4–1 | Smoltz (6–5) | Harang (9–6) | Ray (5) | 44,718 | 45–43 |
| 89 | July 9 | @ Braves | 8–3 | Villarreal (8–1) | Arroyo (9–6) | | 31,908 | 45–44 |
| 90 | July 13 | Rockies | 9–7 | Milton (6–4) | Francis (6–8) | Guardado (1) | 20,660 | 46–44 |
| 91 | July 14 | Rockies | 3–1 | Harang (10–6) | Jennings (6–7) | Guardado (2) | 22,497 | 47–44 |
| 92 | July 15 | Rockies | 3–2 | Bray (2–1) | Fuentes (2–3) | | 35,396 | 48–44 |
| 93 | July 16 | Rockies | 6–4 | Coffey (4–4) | Mesa (0–3) | Guardado (3) | 27,043 | 49–44 |
| 94 | July 18 | Mets | 8–3 | Pelfrey (2–0) | Milton (6–5) | | 27,138 | 49–45 |
| 95 | July 19 | Mets | 7–4 | Coffey (5–4) | Sánchez (5–1) | Guardado (4) | 26,300 | 50–45 |
| 96 | July 20 | Mets | 4–2 | Feliciano (4–2) | Majewski (3–3) | Wagner (19) | 28,729 | 50–46 |
| 97 | July 21 | Brewers | 6–5 | Majewski (4–3) | Turnbow (4–7) | | 19,677 | 51–46 |
| 98 | July 22 | Brewers | 8–7 | Coffey (6–4) | González (2–2) | Guardado (5) | 41,915 | 52–46 |
| 99 | July 23 | Brewers | 4–1 | Ohka (3–1) | Milton (6–6) | Kolb (1) | 22,726 | 52–47 |
| 100 | July 25 | @ Astros | 2–0 | Harang (11–6) | Clemens (2–4) | Bray (1) | 38,865 | 53–47 |
| 101 | July 26 | @ Astros | 8–5 | Pettitte (9–10) | Arroyo (9–7) | Wheeler (2) | 34,381 | 53–48 |
| 102 | July 27 | @ Astros | 8–4 | Ramírez (4–6) | Buchholz (6–9) | | 38,254 | 54–48 |
| 103 | July 28 | @ Brewers | 4–3 | Milton (7–6) | Wise (5–5) | Guardado (6) | 32,743 | 55–48 |
| 104 | July 29 | @ Brewers | 6–3 | González (3–2) | Germano (0–1) | Turnbow (24) | 43,000 | 55–49 |
| 105 | July 30 | @ Brewers | 4–3 | Sheets (2–3) | Harang (11–7) | Cordero (1) | 42,976 | 55–50 |

August

| # | Date | Opponent | Score | Win | Loss | Save | Attendance | Record |
|---|---|---|---|---|---|---|---|---|
| 106 | August 1 | Dodgers | 10–4 | Sele (7–4) | Bray (2–2) | | 25,127 | 55–51 |
| 107 | August 2 | Dodgers | 5–3 | Penny (11–5) | Ramírez (4–7) | Saito (10) | 22,110 | 55–52 |
| 108 | August 3 | Dodgers | 3–0 | Maddux (10–11) | Milton (7–7) | Saito (11) | 26,053 | 55–53 |
| 109 | August 4 | Braves | 5–4 | Harang (12–7) | James (4–3) | Guardado (7) | 33,661 | 56–53 |
| 110 | August 5 | Braves | 8–6 | Weathers (4–3) | Yates (1–2) | Bray (2) | 33,170 | 57–53 |
| 111 | August 6 | Braves | 6–4 | McBride (3–1) | Majewski (3–1) | Wickman (5) | 29,660 | 57–54 |
| 112 | August 7 | Cardinals | 13–1 | Weaver (2–2) | Ramírez (4–8) | | 34,262 | 57–55 |
| 113 | August 8 | Cardinals | 10–3 | Milton (8–7) | Marquis (12–10) | | 40,094 | 58–55 |
| 114 | August 9 | Cardinals | 8–7 | Franklin (2–5) | Isringhausen (3–5) | | 41,649 | 59–55 |
| 115 | August 10 | Cardinals | 6–1 | Reyes (4–5) | Arroyo (9–8) | | 39,591 | 59–56 |
| 116 | August 11 | @ Phillies | 6–5 | Fultz (3–0) | Ramírez (4–9) | | 41,461 | 59–57 |
| 117 | August 12 | @ Phillies | 9–7 | Michalak (1–0) | Gordon (3–0) | Guardado (8) | 39,553 | 60–57 |
| 118 | August 13 | @ Phillies | 7–5 | Bray (3–2) | Madson (10–8) | | 37,677 | 61–57 |
| 119 | August 15 | @ Cardinals | 5–0 | Carpenter (11–6) | Harang (12–8) | | 42,761 | 61–58 |
| 120 | August 16 | @ Cardinals | 7–2 | Arroyo (10–8) | Reyes (4–6) | | 42,752 | 62–58 |
| 121 | August 17 | @ Cardinals | 2–1 | Isringhausen (4–5) | Franklin (2–6) | | 40,346 | 62–59 |
| 122 | August 18 | Pirates | 7–3 | Snell (11–8) | Michalak (1–1) | | 31,718 | 62–60 |
| 123 | August 19 | Pirates | 14–7 | Franklin (3–6) | Torres (3–6) | | 34,245 | 63–60 |
| 124 | August 20 | Pirates | 5–1 | Harang (13–8) | Santos (5–8) | | 29,935 | 64–60 |
| 125 | August 21 | Astros | 4–3 | Franklin (4–6) | Qualls (4–3) | Schoeneweis (1) | 24,110 | 65–60 |
| 126 | August 22 | Astros | 14–0 | Lohse (1–0) | Hirsh (1–2) | | 22,556 | 66–60 |
| 127 | August 23 | Astros | 7–3 | Oswalt (10–8) | Coffey (6–5) | | 24,873 | 66–61 |
| 128 | August 24 | @ Giants | 6–3 | Franklin (5–6) | Chulk (0–2) | Weathers (10) | 38,754 | 67–61 |
| 129 | August 25 | @ Giants | 4–1 | Morris (9–11) | Harang (13–9) | | 37,801 | 67–62 |
| 130 | August 26 | @ Giants | 4–1 | Lowry (7–7) | Arroyo (10–9) | Stanton (3) | 41,362 | 67–63 |
| 131 | August 27 | @ Giants | 8–0 | Cain (10–9) | Lohse (1–1) | | 39,097 | 67–64 |
| 132 | August 28 | @ Dodgers | 6–5 | Penny (14–7) | Michalak (1–2) | Broxton (3) | 44,176 | 67–65 |
| 133 | August 29 | @ Dodgers | 6–5 | Lowe (12–8) | Franklin (5–7) | | 44,697 | 67–66 |
| 134 | August 30 | @ Dodgers | 7–3 | Maddux (12–11) | Harang (13–10) | | 47,356 | 67–67 |

September

| # | Date | Opponent | Score | Win | Loss | Save | Attendance | Record |
|---|---|---|---|---|---|---|---|---|
| 135 | September 1 | @ Padres | 6–2 | Arroyo (11–9) | Hensley (8–11) | | 32,901 | 68–67 |
| 136 | September 2 | @ Padres | 7–1 | Peavy (8–13) | Lohse (1–2) | | 36,287 | 68–68 |
| 137 | September 3 | @ Padres | 2–1 | Meredith (3–1) | Cormier (2–3) | Hoffman (36) | 31,153 | 68–69 |
| 138 | September 4 | Giants | 5–4 | Correia (1–0) | Weathers (4–4) | Stanton (6) | 25,515 | 68–70 |
| 139 | September 5 | Giants | 3–0 | Arroyo (12–9) | Morris (10–12) | | 20,751 | 69–70 |
| 140 | September 6 | Giants | 3–2 | Sánchez (3–0) | Kim (0–1) | Stanton (7) | 20,571 | 69–71 |
| 141 | September 8 | Pirates | 9–1 | Lohse (2–2) | Snell (12–10) | | 17,631 | 70–71 |
| 142 | September 9 | Pirates | 7–4 | Capps (7–1) | Coffey (6–6) | Torres (5) | 25,038 | 70–72 |
| 143 | September 10 | Pirates | 4–2 | Arroyo (13–9) | Youman (0–1) | Schoeneweis (2) | 20,731 | 71–72 |
| 144 | September 12 | Padres | 5–4 | Schoeneweis (1–0) | Brocail (2–2) | | 15,820 | 72–72 |
| 145 | September 13 | Padres | 10–0 | Peavy (9–14) | Lohse (2–3) | | 21,602 | 72–73 |
| 146 | September 14 | Padres | 4–2 | Hensley (9–11) | Harang (13–11) | Hoffman (38) | 16,957 | 72–74 |
| 147 | September 15 | @ Cubs | 4–0 | Arroyo (14–9) | Mármol (5–7) | | 37,188 | 73–74 |
| 148 | September 16 | @ Cubs | 4–0 | Hill (6–6) | Michalak (1–3) | | 40,526 | 73–75 |
| 149 | September 17 | @ Cubs | 11–3 | Zambrano (15–6) | Milton (8–8) | | 39,164 | 73–76 |
| 150 | September 18 | @ Astros | 5–3 | Oswalt (14–8) | Lohse (2–4) | Wheeler (6) | 28,711 | 73–77 |
| 151 | September 19 | @ Astros | 5–4 | Harang (14–11) | Albers (0–2) | Weathers (11) | 36,930 | 74–77 |
| 152 | September 20 | @ Astros | 7–2 | Clemens (7–5) | Arroyo (14–10) | | 31,928 | 74–78 |
| 153 | September 22 | Cubs | 4–2 | Michalak (2–3) | Hill (6–7) | Coffey (8) | 21,332 | 75–78 |
| 154 | September 23 | Cubs | 11–4 | Zambrano (16–6) | Lohse (2–5) | | 28,264 | 75–79 |
| 155 | September 24 | Cubs | 3–2 | Harang (15–11) | Dempster (1–9) | | 22,226 | 76–79 |
| 156 | September 25 | Cubs | 5–4 | Schoeneweis (2–0) | Eyre (1–3) | Weathers (12) | 16,278 | 77–79 |
| 157 | September 26 | @ Marlins | 5–3 | Franklin (6–7) | Willis (12–12) | Schoeneweis (3) | 11,422 | 78–79 |
| 158 | September 27 | @ Marlins | 7–2 | Sánchez (10–3) | Michalak (2–4) | | 13,295 | 78–80 |
| 159 | September 28 | @ Marlins | 5–1 | Lohse (3–5) | Nolasco (11–11) | | 14,106 | 79–80 |
| 160 | September 29 | @ Pirates | 5–2 | Harang (16–11) | Duke (10–15) | | 27,033 | 80–80 |
| 161 | September 30 | @ Pirates | 3–0 | McLeary (2–0) | Arroyo (14–11) | Torres (11) | 35,514 | 80–81 |

October

| # | Date | Opponent | Score | Win | Loss | Save | Attendance | Record |
|---|---|---|---|---|---|---|---|---|
| 162 | October 1 | @ Pirates | 1–0 | Capps (9–1) | Coffey (6–7) | Torres (12) | 25,004 | 80–82 |

== Player stats ==
=== Batting ===
==== Starters by position ====
Note: Pos = Position; G = Games played; AB = At bats; H = Hits; Avg. = Batting average; HR = Home runs; RBI = Runs batted in

| Pos | Player | G | AB | H | Avg. | HR | RBI |
|---|---|---|---|---|---|---|---|
| C | David Ross | 90 | 247 | 63 | .255 | 21 | 52 |
| 1B | Scott Hatteberg | 141 | 456 | 132 | .289 | 13 | 51 |
| 2B | Brandon Phillips | 149 | 536 | 148 | .276 | 17 | 75 |
| SS | Felipe López | 85 | 343 | 92 | .268 | 9 | 30 |
| 3B | Edwin Encarnación | 117 | 406 | 112 | .276 | 15 | 72 |
| LF | Adam Dunn | 160 | 561 | 131 | .234 | 40 | 92 |
| CF | Ken Griffey Jr. | 109 | 428 | 108 | .252 | 27 | 72 |
| RF | Austin Kearns | 87 | 325 | 89 | .274 | 16 | 50 |

==== Other batters ====
Note: G = Games played; AB = At bats; H = Hits; Avg. = Batting average; HR = Home runs; RBI = Runs batted in

| Player | G | AB | H | Avg. | HR | RBI |
|---|---|---|---|---|---|---|
| Ryan Freel | 132 | 454 | 123 | .271 | 8 | 27 |
| Rich Aurilia | 122 | 440 | 132 | .300 | 23 | 70 |
| Jason LaRue | 72 | 191 | 37 | .194 | 8 | 21 |
| Javier Valentín | 92 | 186 | 50 | .269 | 8 | 27 |
| Royce Clayton | 50 | 149 | 35 | .235 | 2 | 13 |
| Chris Denorfia | 49 | 106 | 30 | .283 | 1 | 7 |
| Juan Castro | 54 | 95 | 27 | .284 | 2 | 14 |
| Todd Hollandsworth | 34 | 68 | 18 | .265 | 1 | 8 |
| Quinton McCracken | 45 | 53 | 11 | .208 | 1 | 2 |
| Ray Olmedo | 30 | 44 | 9 | .205 | 1 | 4 |
| Norris Hopper | 21 | 39 | 14 | .359 | 1 | 5 |
| DeWayne Wise | 31 | 38 | 7 | .184 | 0 | 1 |
| Tony Womack | 9 | 18 | 4 | .222 | 0 | 3 |
| Brendan Harris | 8 | 10 | 2 | .200 | 1 | 1 |
| Cody Ross | 2 | 5 | 1 | .200 | 0 | 0 |
| Andy Abad | 5 | 3 | 0 | .000 | 0 | 0 |
| Brandon Watson | 1 | 0 | 0 | ---- | 0 | 0 |

=== Pitching ===
==== Starting pitchers ====
Note: G = Games pitched; IP = Innings pitched; W = Wins; L = Losses; ERA = Earned run average; SO = Strikeouts

| Player | G | IP | W | L | ERA | SO |
|---|---|---|---|---|---|---|
| Bronson Arroyo | 35 | 240.2 | 14 | 11 | 3.29 | 184 |
| Aaron Harang | 36 | 234.1 | 16 | 11 | 3.76 | 216 |
| Eric Milton | 26 | 152.2 | 8 | 8 | 5.19 | 90 |
| Elizardo Ramírez | 21 | 104.0 | 4 | 9 | 5.37 | 69 |
| Brandon Claussen | 14 | 77.0 | 3 | 8 | 6.19 | 57 |
| Kyle Lohse | 12 | 63.0 | 3 | 5 | 4.57 | 51 |
| David Williams | 8 | 40.0 | 2 | 3 | 7.20 | 16 |
| Chris Michalak | 8 | 35.0 | 2 | 4 | 4.89 | 10 |

==== Other pitchers ====
Note: G = Games pitched; IP = Innings pitched; W = Wins; L = Losses; ERA = Earned run average; SO = Strikeouts

| Player | G | IP | W | L | ERA | SO |
|---|---|---|---|---|---|---|
| Joe Mays | 7 | 27.0 | 0 | 1 | 7.33 | 16 |
| Sun-Woo Kim | 2 | 6.2 | 0 | 1 | 5.40 | 4 |
| Justin Germano | 2 | 6.2 | 0 | 1 | 5.40 | 8 |

==== Relief pitchers ====
Note: G = Games pitched; W = Wins; L = Losses; SV = Saves; ERA = Earned run average; SO = Strikeouts

| Player | G | W | L | SV | ERA | SO |
|---|---|---|---|---|---|---|
| David Weathers | 67 | 4 | 4 | 12 | 3.54 | 50 |
| Todd Coffey | 81 | 6 | 7 | 8 | 3.58 | 60 |
| Kent Mercker | 37 | 1 | 1 | 1 | 4.13 | 17 |
| Matt Belisle | 30 | 2 | 0 | 0 | 3.60 | 26 |
| Chris Hammond | 29 | 1 | 1 | 0 | 6.91 | 23 |
| Bill Bray | 29 | 2 | 1 | 2 | 4.23 | 23 |
| Rick White | 26 | 1 | 0 | 1 | 6.26 | 17 |
| Brian Shackelford | 26 | 1 | 0 | 0 | 7.16 | 15 |
| Jason Standridge | 21 | 1 | 1 | 0 | 4.82 | 18 |
| Rhéal Cormier | 21 | 0 | 1 | 0 | 4.50 | 6 |
| Ryan Franklin | 20 | 5 | 2 | 0 | 4.44 | 18 |
| Gary Majewski | 19 | 1 | 2 | 0 | 8.40 | 9 |
| Scott Schoeneweis | 16 | 2 | 0 | 3 | 0.63 | 11 |
| Eddie Guardado | 15 | 0 | 0 | 8 | 1.29 | 17 |
| Esteban Yan | 14 | 1 | 0 | 1 | 3.60 | 8 |
| Mike Burns | 11 | 0 | 0 | 0 | 8.78 | 9 |
| Jason Johnson | 4 | 0 | 0 | 0 | 3.12 | 4 |
| Mike Gosling | 1 | 0 | 0 | 0 | 13.50 | 1 |

== Farm system ==
| Level | Team | League | Manager |
|---|---|---|---|
| AAA | Louisville Bats | International League | Rick Sweet |
| AA | Chattanooga Lookouts | Southern League | Jayhawk Owens |
| A | Sarasota Reds | Florida State League | Donnie Scott |
| A | Dayton Dragons | Midwest League | Billy Gardner Jr. |
| Rookie | GCL Reds | Gulf Coast League | Luis Aguayo |
| Rookie | Billings Mustangs | Pioneer League | Rick Burleson |
