= Chris Demaria =

American baseball player (born 1980)

- Pitcher
- Born: September 28, 1980 (age 45); Torrance, California, U.S.
- Batted: Both Threw: Right

MLB debut
- September 9, 2005, for the Kansas City Royals

Last MLB appearance
- May 22, 2006, for the Milwaukee Brewers

MLB statistics
- Win–loss record: 1–1
- Earned run average: 7.15
- Strikeouts: 22
- Stats at Baseball Reference

Teams
- Kansas City Royals (2005); Milwaukee Brewers (2006)

Chris Demaria (born September 28, 1980) is an American baseball player who briefly played in the major leagues on two occasions: for the Kansas City Royals in 2005, and for the Milwaukee Brewers in 2006.

Chris attended North High School (Torrance), and graduated in 1998, where he starred in baseball. He played college baseball at Long Beach State University in 2001 and 2002, and in 2002 was drafted in the 17th round by the Pittsburgh Pirates. He played in the Pirates minor league system from 2002 to 2004. After the 2004 season, Demaria was the 1st pick in the Triple-A phase of the Rule 5 draft by the Kansas City Royals. In 2005, Demaria started the season in the Class A California League, but reached the Major Leagues with the Royals by the end of the year. After the 2005 season, Demaria was traded from the Royals to the Milwaukee Brewers for Justin Barnes. Demaria started the 2006 season at the Brewers' Triple-A affiliate, the Nashville Sounds, and was called up to Milwaukee in mid April. He was sent back to Nashville in May, where he remained for the rest of the season. During spring training in 2007, Demaria was released by the Brewers.

== See also ==
- Rule 5 draft results
