= Humberto Cota =

Mexican baseball player (born 1979)

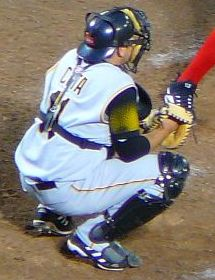
- Cota in 2006
- Catcher
- Born: February 7, 1979 (age 47); San Luis Rio Colorado, Mexico
- Batted: Right Threw: Right

MLB debut
- September 9, 2001, for the Pittsburgh Pirates

Last MLB appearance
- May 28, 2007, for the Pittsburgh Pirates

MLB statistics
- Batting average: .233
- Home runs: 12
- Runs batted in: 61
- Stats at Baseball Reference

Teams
- Pittsburgh Pirates (2001–2007)

Humberto Cota (born February 7, 1979) is a Mexican former professional baseball catcher. He played with the Pittsburgh Pirates of Major League Baseball (MLB).

== Career ==
Cota was signed as an amateur free agent by the Atlanta Braves on December 22, 1995. He was released in January 1997 without having played any games. In May 1997, he signed with the Tampa Bay Devil Rays. After two years in the lower levels of their minor league system, Cota was traded with Joe Oliver to the Pittsburgh Pirates for José Guillén and Jeff Sparks on July 23, 1999.

He continued to advance through Pittsburgh's minor league system before making his MLB debut on September 9, 2001. He split the 2003 to 2005 seasons between the Pirates and their Triple-A clubs. On April 7, 2003, he caught a perfect game with batterymate John Wasdin of the Nashville Sounds. He became a free agent after the 2007 season.

He signed a minor league contract with the Washington Nationals before the 2008 season, but refused an assignment to minor league camp during spring training and became a free agent. He then signed a minor league deal with the Colorado Rockies.

On May 28, 2008, Cota was suspended 50 games for failing a drug test. He became a free agent at the end of the season and signed a minor league contract with an invitation to spring training with the Cincinnati Reds on February 2, 2009. He was released in March 2009.

From the 2008 to 2009 winter through that of 2016 to 2017, Cota played in the Mexican League and the Mexican Pacific Winter League. He briefly played for the Arizona Diamondbacks' Double-A Mobile BayBears in 2013. On May 24, 2016, he was traded to the Mexican League's Broncos de Reynosa, and then to the Vaqueros Laguna on June 28. On September 19, he was returned to the Bronco. He was released on March 18, 2017..
