= Brian Rogers (baseball) =

American baseball player (born 1982)

- Relief pitcher
- Born: July 17, 1982 (age 44); Dallas, Texas, U.S.
- Batted: Right Threw: Right

MLB debut
- September 1, 2006, for the Pittsburgh Pirates

Last MLB appearance
- May 26, 2007, for the Pittsburgh Pirates

MLB statistics
- Win–loss record: 0–0
- Earned run average: 9.28
- Strikeouts: 8
- Stats at Baseball Reference

Teams
- Pittsburgh Pirates (2006–2007)

Brian Alan Rogers (born July 17, 1982) is an American former relief pitcher in Major League Baseball who played for the Pittsburgh Pirates in 2006 and 2007.

== Amateur career ==
Rogers pitched for Georgia Southern University. In 2002, he played collegiate summer baseball with the Orleans Cardinals of the Cape Cod Baseball League, where he was named a league all-star and received the league's outstanding pitcher award.

== Professional career ==
=== Detroit Tigers ===
He was selected by the Detroit Tigers in the 11th round of the 2003 MLB draft. Detroit assigned him to the Low-A Oneonta Tigers in the New York–Penn League, where he went 3–2 with a 3.34 ERA in twelve starts. In 2004 Detroit promoted Rogers to the Single-A West Michigan Whitecaps, where he went 6–8 with a 4.55 ERA. Lack of run support contributed to several losses: at one point in April, Rogers was 0–1 despite three consecutive quality starts and a 2.38 ERA. For 2005, Detroit converted Rogers into a relief pitcher and promoted him to the High-A Lakeland Tigers, where he posted a 2.06 ERA in 52 appearances. Rogers and fellow middle-reliever Danny Zell were cited by manager Mel Rojas as integral to Lakeland's success that year, while pitching coach Britt Burns called Rogers "the most improved pitcher on this staff."

Detroit promoted Rogers to the Double-A Erie SeaWolves where he continued to work as a reliever, compiling a 3–2 record with an ERA of 2.39 by the end of July, when the Tigers traded him to the Pittsburgh Pirates for first basemen Sean Casey.

=== Pittsburgh Pirates ===
Rogers made a whirlwind tour through Pittsburgh's minor league system, making a combined nine appearances with the Double-A Altoona Curve and Triple-A Indianapolis Indians, during which he posted a 1–1 record and an ERA of 0.93. The Pirates called Rogers up at the end of August, and Rogers made his major league debut on September 1, 2006. In ten appearances with the Pirates, Rogers posted an ERA of 8.31, but did not figure in any decisions. Rogers spent most of the 2007 season in Indianapolis, where he went 2–1 with a 3.05 ERA. The Pirates recalled Rogers briefly in May 2006, but optioned him back to Indianapolis after he gave up three runs (including two home runs) in just two innings of work.

Rogers returned to the Pirates' minor leagues for 2008, but was released in mid-June. The Tigers, who had traded Rogers in 2006, promptly signed him to a contract and sent him to the Triple-A Toledo Mud Hens. After posting an ERA of 7.65 in sixteen appearances the Tigers released Rogers to make room for Gary Glover. He finished the season playing for the Binghamton Mets in the New York Mets' minor leagues and became a free agent at the end of the season.
