= Joe Winkelsas =

American baseball player (born 1973)

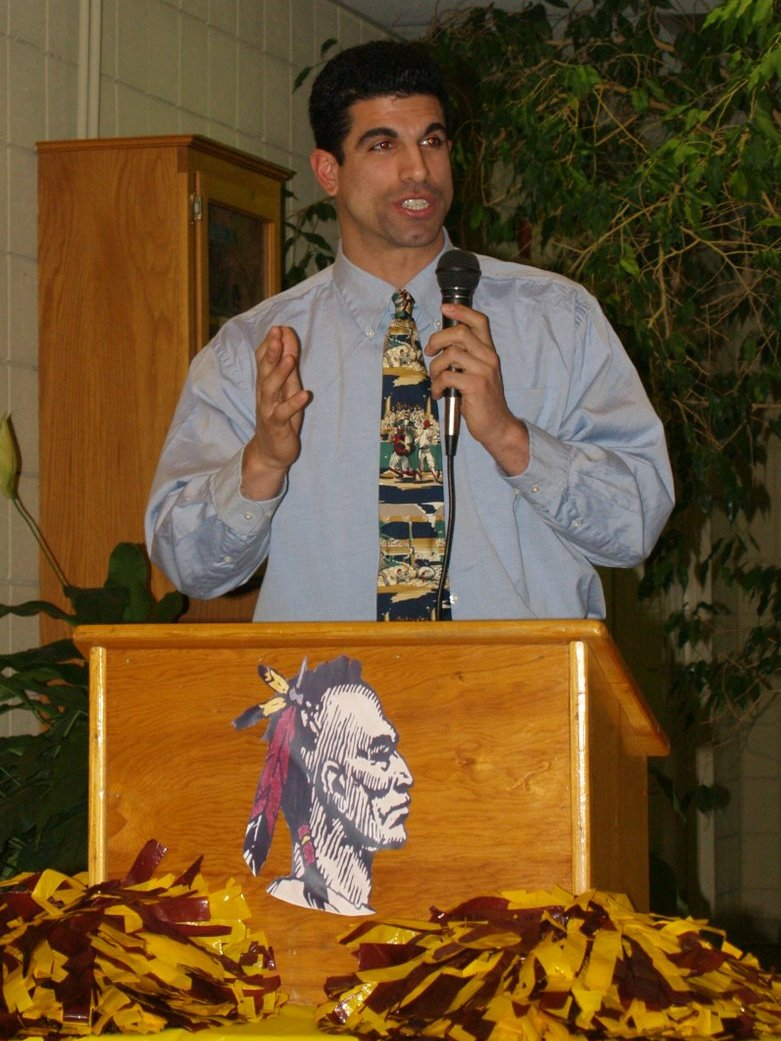
- Winkelsas in 2009
- Pitcher
- Born: September 14, 1973 (age 52); Buffalo, New York, U.S.
- Batted: Right Threw: Right

MLB debut
- April 10, 1999, for the Atlanta Braves

Last MLB appearance
- June 9, 2006, for the Milwaukee Brewers

MLB statistics
- Win–loss record: 0–1
- Earned run average: 9.82
- Strikeouts: 4
- Stats at Baseball Reference

Teams
- Atlanta Braves (1999); Milwaukee Brewers (2006)

Joseph Winkelsas (born September 14, 1973) is an American former right-handed professional baseball pitcher. He pitched parts of two seasons in Major League Baseball.

== Amateur career ==
Winkelsas started his college career in 1992 at the University of South Carolina Salkehatchie, a small NJCAA school in Allendale, South Carolina. While at USC Salkehatchie, he led the NJCAA Division II in ERA his sophomore season. After completing two years at USC Salkehatchie, he then went on to Elon University.

== Professional career ==
=== Atlanta Braves ===
Winkelsas signed with the Atlanta Braves as an amateur free agent in 1996. He began his professional career that season with the minor league Danville Braves, and over the next three years he worked his way through the Braves' farm system. He made his major league debut on April 10, 1999, with the Braves, pitching one-third of an inning against the Arizona Diamondbacks and allowing four hits, a walk, and two runs. He then was sent to the minors, and continued to pitch in the Braves' farm system until July 2003, when he was released.

During this period, Winkelsas has admitted to being sidetracked in his career by marijuana usage, quitting after going through rehabilitation in 2000.

=== Chicago White Sox ===
Winkelsas did not pitch professionally for the rest of 2003, and in 2004 he signed with the independent Elmira Pioneers. He pitched just three games for them before being released, and signed with the Somerset Patriots, another independent team. After seven games with the Patriots, he was picked up by the Chicago White Sox organization and was assigned to their farm system. By the end of the season, he had made it back to the Charlotte Knights, where he pitched the rest of 2004. He started 2005 back in Charlotte, but was released in April. He signed with The Grays of the Canadian American Association of Professional Baseball, where he pitched just one game before developing an arm injury.

=== Milwaukee Brewers ===
He worked as a garbage man for a while, which he credited with helping rebuild his arm strength. In the spring of 2006, Winkelsas signed with the Milwaukee Brewers organization, and was assigned to the Huntsville Stars, the Brewers' Double-A affiliate. On May 23, 2006, the Brewers called him up, and he made his second big-league appearance that day against the Cincinnati Reds, a scoreless third of an inning. He stayed in the big leagues with the Brewers until June 21, and he announced his retirement on July 4, 2006 due to arm numbness, having appeared in just seven games.

=== Back to the Braves ===
However, he returned to professional baseball in 2007, returning to the Braves organization. That year, he combined to go 2-2, 3.00 in 19 outings between Double-A Mississippi and Triple-A Richmond in the Atlanta chain before being released in midseason.

=== Back to the White Sox ===
Winkelsas again sat out the remainder of the season, but in 2008 he returned to the White Sox organization. He had a stretch of 26 scoreless innings, with more than half of those against White Sox affiliates, so the Sox took another chance on him. This stint lasted just seven games between Charlotte and Birmingham before he was once again released on May 31, 2008.

In 2010, he tried another comeback, this time with the Newark Bears of the Atlantic League. He appeared in eight games, winning one, and posting an ERA of 6.00.

== Honors ==
On January 29, 2009, Winkelsas became the first member inducted into the University of South Carolina Salkehatchie athletic hall of fame.
