= Sean Casey (baseball) =

American baseball player (born 1974)

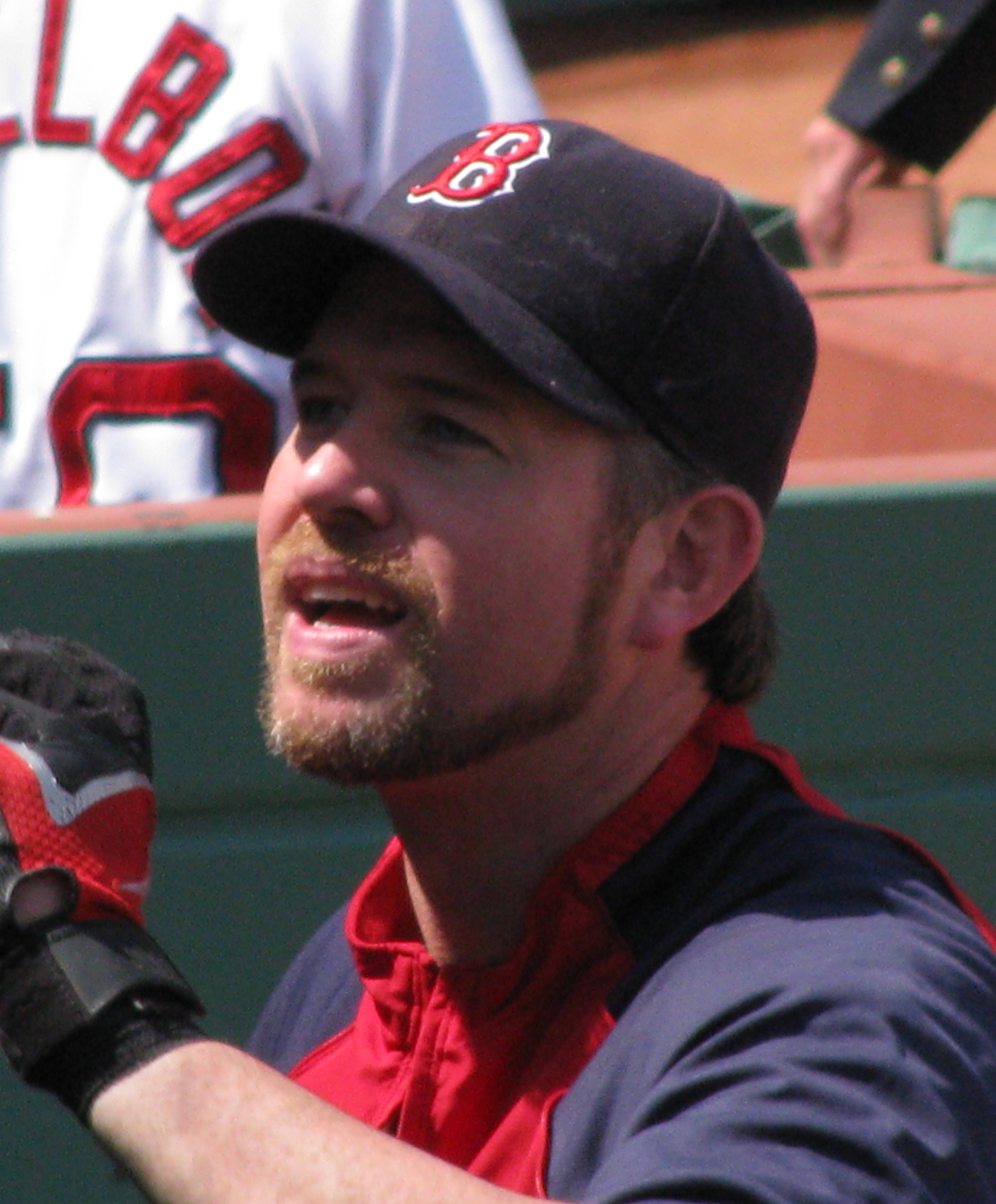
- Casey with the Boston Red Sox in 2008
- First baseman
- Born: July 2, 1974 (age 52); Willingboro Township, New Jersey, U.S.
- Batted: Left Threw: Right

MLB debut
- September 12, 1997, for the Cleveland Indians

Last MLB appearance
- September 28, 2008, for the Boston Red Sox

MLB statistics
- Batting average: .302
- Home runs: 130
- Runs batted in: 735
- Stats at Baseball Reference

Teams
- As player: Cleveland Indians (1997); Cincinnati Reds (1998–2005); Pittsburgh Pirates (2006); Detroit Tigers (2006–2007); Boston Red Sox (2008); As coach: New York Yankees (2023)

Career highlights and awards
- 3× All-Star (1999, 2001, 2004); Cincinnati Reds Hall of Fame

Sean Thomas Casey (born July 2, 1974), nicknamed "the Mayor", is an American former professional baseball first baseman, coach and media personality. During his Major League Baseball (MLB) career, Casey played for the Cleveland Indians, Cincinnati Reds, Pittsburgh Pirates, Detroit Tigers, and Boston Red Sox. Casey was selected to the MLB All-Star Game three times during his career. He was the hitting coach for the New York Yankees in 2023. After retiring from professional baseball, Casey transitioned into broadcasting and has been a prominent broadcaster and commentator for MLB Network since 2009, a role he still holds today. In addition to his broadcasting work, Casey is the host of the popular “The Mayor’s Office with Sean Casey” podcast, where he shares engaging conversations with athletes, entertainers, and industry leaders.

== Early life and education ==
Casey was born in Willingboro, New Jersey, the son of Joan and Jim Casey. He and his family moved to Upper St. Clair Township, Pennsylvania, when he was a child. He graduated from Upper St. Clair High School in Upper St. Clair, and the University of Richmond in Richmond, Virginia, where he played college baseball for the Richmond Spiders.

As a freshman for the Spiders in 1993, Casey had a .386 batting average, a .447 on-base percentage (OBP), and a .526 SLG, with two home runs. He was named a freshman All-American and second team All-Colonial Athletic Association (CAA).

As a sophomore in 1994, Casey batted .371 with a .656 SLG, 13 home runs, and 57 runs batted in (RBIs). He was named first team All-CAA. Following his sophomore season at Richmond, Casey played collegiate summer baseball for the Brewster Whitecaps of the Cape Cod Baseball League (CCBL), where he batted .338 with one home run and 30 RBIs, and was named a league all-star. In 2003, he was inducted into the CCBL Hall of Fame.

In the 1995 season as a junior, Casey hit for a .461 batting average to lead all Division I players. Casey was again named first team All-CAA and won the CAA Player of the Year. He was also named a Second Team All-American and ECAC Player of the Year while becoming the first player to ever win the CAA Triple Crown. He graduated from Richmond and was a member of Sigma Phi Epsilon fraternity.

== Playing career ==
=== Cleveland Indians ===
The Cleveland Indians chose Casey in the second round, with the 53rd overall selection, of the 1995 MLB draft. Casey began his professional career with the Watertown Indians of the Class A-Short Season New York–Penn League, where he batted .329 with two home runs. He was promoted to the Kinston Indians of the Class A-Advanced Carolina League to begin the 1996 season. He hit .331 with twelve home runs for Kinston.

Casey started 1997 with the Akron Aeros of the Class AA Eastern League. On June 18, the Indians promoted Casey to the Buffalo Bisons of the Class AAA American Association after batting .386 with 19 doubles, 10 home runs and 66 RBIs in 62 games with Akron. In 20 games with Buffalo, Casey hit five home runs and 18 RBIs. On September 12, Casey was promoted to the Cleveland Indians as a September call-up. He appeared in six games for the Indians, going 2-for-10 (.200) with two walks and one RBI. Casey won the Lou Boudreau Award as the Cleveland Indians' top minor-league position player, at the conclusion of the 1997 season. Baseball America named him the No. 20 prospect in baseball before the 1998 season.

=== Cincinnati Reds ===
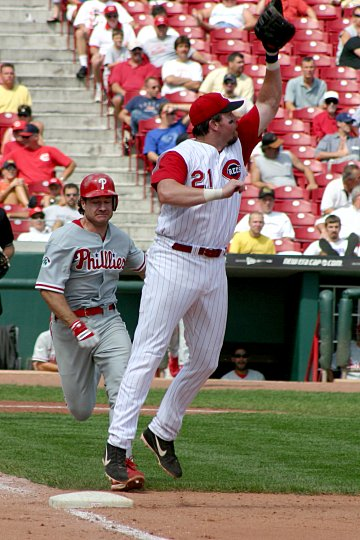
Casey with the Cincinnati Reds in 2004

On March 30, 1998, Casey was traded to the Cincinnati Reds for Dave Burba. On April 3, 1998, Casey was hit in the eye with a ball thrown by teammate Damian Jackson during batting practice, resulting in an orbital fracture, and subsequent surgery. Casey's surgery took two surgeons, operating for four hours to fix his fracture. Just three weeks after the surgery, Casey began his rehab assignment with the Indianapolis Indians, and just a week after joining the Indians, he was recalled to the Reds. Casey struggled during his first season with the Reds, his average dipped to .133, and he was sent back to Indianapolis. On June 18, Casey was recalled to the Reds.

On May 19, 1999, the Reds defeated the Colorado Rockies in a 24−12 final, tied for the fourth-highest run-scoring output in MLB history. Casey hit two of the Reds' six home runs, and reached base seven times with four hits and three walks. He also scored five runs and drove in six. He was selected to the All-Star Game for the first time in 1999. Casey produced a breakout offensive season in 1999, batting .332 with 25 home runs, 99 RBIs, 42 doubles, and 103 runs scored in 151 games. He was fourth in the National League in batting and doubles, and sixth in singles. In 1999, he won the Hutch Award.

During his tenure in Cincinnati, and later in Pittsburgh and Detroit, Casey was regarded as approachable and friendly, and his nickname, "the Mayor", comes from his reputation for chatting casually with every runner who makes it to first base, and from his very public charity work. It was frequently expanded to "the Mayor of Riverfront" when the Reds played at Riverfront Stadium. On May 16, 2007, Casey was voted in 2007 as "the friendliest player in baseball" by fellow players in a Sports Illustrated poll. He garnered 46% of the vote with the second place vote being split between Jim Thome and Mike Sweeney with only 7% each. Casey was also regarded as among the slowest-running players in the game, grounding into 27 double plays in the 2005 season. This tied him with A. J. Pierzynski for the record of most grounding in double plays by a National League left-handed batter in a season.

=== Pittsburgh Pirates ===
On December 8, 2005, Casey was traded to his hometown Pittsburgh Pirates for left-handed pitcher Dave Williams. On April 14, 2006, Casey left a game against the Chicago Cubs after suffering two fractures of the transverse process in his lower left back. He was placed on the disabled list on April 15. After a rehab assignment with the Altoona Curve, Casey returned to the Pirates lineup. He played in 59 games for the Pirates during the 2006 season, batted .296 with three home runs and 29 RBIs.

=== Detroit Tigers ===
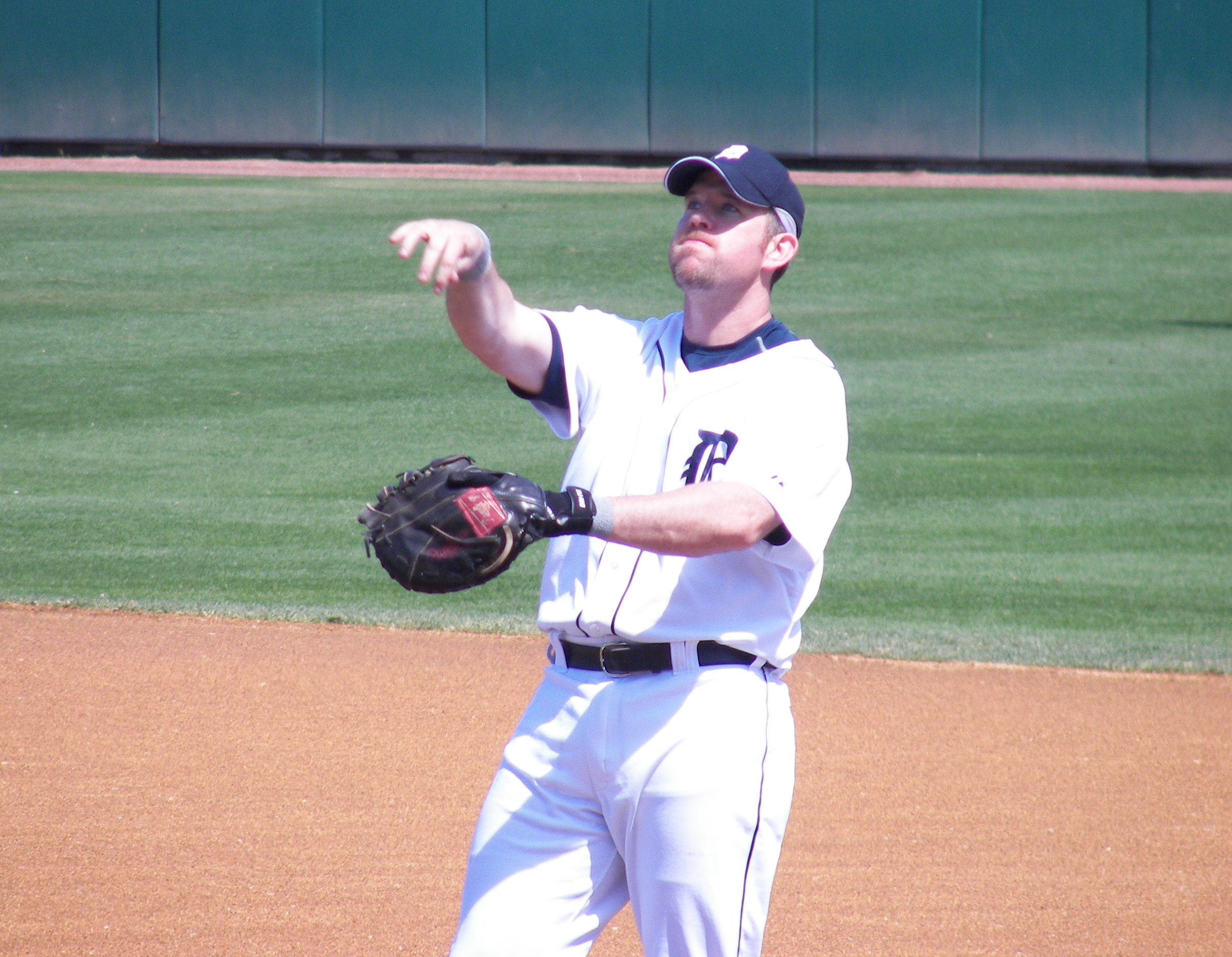
Casey with the Detroit Tigers in 2007

On July 31, 2006, the Pirates traded Casey to the Detroit Tigers for minor league pitcher Brian Rogers. During the 2006 American League Championship Series against the Oakland Athletics, he partially tore his left calf muscle in Game 1. After coming back from his torn calf in Game 2 of the World Series, Casey became the hottest hitter for the Tigers, belting two home runs and batting .432 in five games. His .432 batting average was one of the best in Tigers' postseason history.

Casey has been active in Big Brothers and Make-A-Wish Foundation, as well as the "Casey's Crew" program, where he provided free high-priced tickets to disadvantaged youth. Casey credits his Christian upbringing in Pittsburgh's affluent Upper St. Clair suburb for his generosity.

After being told by Dave Dombrowski and Jim Leyland that he would not be re-signed, Casey still praised Mike Ilitch, Dombrowski, and Jim Leyland for giving him the opportunity to come play for Detroit. Casey said "They let me know. I've had a great time with this team, the greatest year and a half of my career. It was great. But I understand the situation."

=== Boston Red Sox ===
On February 5, 2008, the Boston Red Sox announced they had signed Casey to a one-year deal. On April 9, 2008, Red Sox third baseman Mike Lowell injured his thumb and was then placed on the DL, first baseman Kevin Youkilis was moved to third, and Casey stepped in as the starting first baseman and exploded by making some good defensive plays and hitting .318 with five RBIs in his first seven games despite missing games in Japan due to a stiff neck he received during the 18-hour flight. He was on the disabled list from April 26 through May 12, and returned as a significant part-time player, finishing the regular season with a .773 OPS on 199 at-bats in 69 games.

Casey was suspended by the MLB for three games after his actions in the Coco Crisp–James Shields brawl.

== Post-playing career ==
Casey announced his retirement on January 25, 2009, at the age of 34, having played 12 seasons of Major League Baseball. He accepted a position as a baseball analyst for MLB Network. He appeared on MLB Tonight, the Spring Training series 30 Clubs in 30 Days, the children-focused weekly interview and demonstration show Play Ball and MLB Network's special event coverage throughout the year.

On July 3, 2009, Casey sat in for Red Sox color commentator Jerry Remy, calling the first game for his old team. On January 14, 2011, the Reds announced that Casey would do color commentary for 15 telecasts on Fox Sports Ohio during the 2011 season.

The New York Yankees hired Casey as their hitting coach on July 10, 2023.

== Awards and accomplishments ==
- National League All-Star, 1999, 2001, 2004
- Hutch Award, 1999 given to the player who personifies the spirit, courage and integrity of former manager Fred Hutchinson.
- Inducted into the University of Richmond, Department of Athletics Hall of Fame in 2003.

With Conan O'Brien, Casey is a founder of Labels Are For Jars, an innovative anti-hunger organization based in Lawrence, Massachusetts.

In a May 16, 2007, Sports Illustrated Player's Poll, Casey won the distinction of being considered the "friendliest player in baseball", after winning 46% of the votes. 464 MLB players participated in the survey. Hal McCoy, a Cincinnati Reds beat writer for 35 years, has said, "There's no debate, and there never will be a debate. Sean Casey is the nicest guy in professional baseball. Ever."

On August 26, 2008, Casey was inducted into the Irish American Baseball Hall of Fame.

On January 29, 2009, Casey was inducted into the Kinston Professional Baseball Hall of Fame.

Casey was inducted to the Cincinnati Reds Baseball Hall of Fame (along with Dan Driessen and John Reilly) on June 23, 2012.

In 2014, Casey was inducted into the Virginia Sports Hall of Fame.

== Personal life ==
Casey resides in Upper St. Clair Township, Pennsylvania, with his wife, Sarah. He has four children—Andrew, Jake, Carli, and Jillian—from his previous marriage to Mandi Casey.

Awards and achievements
Preceded by Russell Branyan	Indians Minor League Player of the Year (the Lou Boudreau Award); 1997	Succeeded by Alex Ramírez
