= Chris Barnwell =

American baseball player (born 1979)

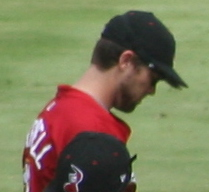
- Barnwell with the Nashville Sounds in 2006

Retired
- Infielder
- Born: March 1, 1979 (age 46); Jacksonville, Florida, U.S.
- Batted: Right Threw: Right

MLB debut
- June 20, 2006, for the Milwaukee Brewers

Last MLB appearance
- July 25, 2006, for the Milwaukee Brewers

MLB statistics
- Batting average: .067
- Hits: 2
- Runs: 2
- Stats at Baseball Reference

Teams
- Milwaukee Brewers (2006)

Christopher Edward Barnwell (born March 1, 1979) is a Canadian American former professional baseball infielder. He played for the Milwaukee Brewers of the Major League Baseball (MLB).

== College ==
Chris was a collegiate standout at now-NCAA Div. II Flagler College in Florida from 1998 to 2001. He had his number "5" retired in 2007. He is the first Flagler baseball player to reach the Major Leagues. He is Flagler's career leader in at-bats, hits, singles, doubles, runs batted in, and assists.

External images
- Number Retirement Ceremony
- Number Retirement Ceremony

== Professional baseball career ==
=== Milwaukee Brewers ===
Barnwell was drafted by the Milwaukee Brewers in the 25th round of the 2001 Major League Baseball draft. He began the 2001 season at the Milwaukee Brewers' rookie league affiliate, the Ogden Raptors. He was awarded the Coaches Award in 2001. He started 2002 at their Single-A Beloit Snappers, and was promoted to their High-A High Desert Mavericks during the season. Barnwell played at the Brewers Double-A Huntsville Stars during 2003 and 2004, and the beginning of 2005. Early in the season, he was promoted to the Triple-A Nashville Sounds. He started the 2006 season in Nashville before being called up to Milwaukee to make his major league debut on June 20, 2006, becoming the first Flagler baseball player to reach the Major Leagues. He played in thirteen games for the Brewers before returning to the Sounds. He spent the remainder of the 2006 season and the entire 2007 season at Nashville. He became a free agent after the 2007 season.

=== Florida Marlins ===
In January 2008, the Florida Marlins signed Barnwell to a minor league contract with an invitation to spring training. Chris was selected as a 2008 Triple-A Pacific Coast League All-Star. He became a free agent at the end of the season.

=== Houston Astros ===
He signed a minor league contract with the Houston Astros in December 2008. In April 2009, Barnwell was traded to the Pittsburgh Pirates.

=== Pittsburgh Pirates ===
In April 2009, Barnwell was traded to the Pittsburgh Pirates and reported to Triple-A Indianapolis.

== International career ==
He was the starting shortstop and leadoff hitter for Team Canada at the 2009 World Baseball Classic. His father is Canadian making him eligible for the Canadian team.
