= Elizardo Ramírez =

Dominican baseball player (born 1983)

- Pitcher
- Born: January 28, 1983 (age 43); Villa Mella, Dominican Republic
- Batted: Switch Threw: Right

MLB debut
- May 25, 2004, for the Philadelphia Phillies

Last MLB appearance
- June 4, 2008, for the Texas Rangers

MLB statistics
- Win–loss record: 4–15
- Earned run average: 6.40
- Strikeouts: 96
- Stats at Baseball Reference

Teams
- Philadelphia Phillies (2004); Cincinnati Reds (2005–2007); Texas Rangers (2008)

Elizardo Ramírez de Paula (born January 28, 1983) is a Dominican former Major League Baseball (MLB) pitcher who played for the Philadelphia Phillies, Cincinnati Reds and Texas Rangers.

Ramírez was a typical finesse pitcher, with an average fastball that he threw anywhere from 88 to 92 MPH. He also threw an average curveball and an average changeup.

== Professional baseball career ==
=== 2000–03 seasons ===
After signing as a free agent in 1999 with the Philadelphia Phillies, Ramírez played with the Dominican Phillies (2000), Gulf Coast Phillies (2002), and Clearwater Threshers (2003).

=== 2004 season ===
Ramírez was acquired by the Cincinnati Reds on August 11, 2004, as the player to be named later in an earlier trade involving starting pitcher Cory Lidle. Ramírez spent the season with four teams: Clearwater Threshers, Reading Phillies, and Chattanooga Lookouts before making his Major League debut with the Philadelphia Phillies.

=== 2005 season ===
In 2005, Ramírez split time between the Triple-A Louisville Bats and Cincinnati Reds.

=== 2006 season ===
In 2006, Ramírez made one start for the Dayton Dragons while the Reds were on the all-star break and started a few games early in the season for the Louisville Bats before being called up to the Cincinnati Reds. On August 2, Ramírez had a 4.22 ERA and at the time was the 3rd most consistent starting pitcher for the Reds. What followed was one of Jerry Narron's most infamous debacles to date. On August 12, the Reds were in extra innings with the Phillies when Narron used Ramírez in relief. He pitched 1/3 inning and took the loss when Narron intentionally walked the strikeout prone Ryan Howard to load the bases with nobody out to move the winning run to third base. Even so, the very next day, Ramírez still made his regularly scheduled start, pitching 1.1 innings and giving up 5 earned runs. His season ended on the disabled list.

=== 2007 season ===
In 2007, Ramírez made three starts in four appearances for the Reds and became a free agent after the season.

=== 2008 season ===
After signing with the Texas Rangers during the off-season, Ramírez started 2008 with the Triple-A Oklahoma Redhawks, before being called up on June 4. In his season debut that same day, Ramírez gave up eight runs in 2 2/3 innings of relief. He was designated for assignment on June 8.

=== 2009 season ===
On January 1, 2009, Ramírez re-signed with the Texas Rangers, to a minor league contract.
