= Marty McLeary =

American baseball player (born 1974)

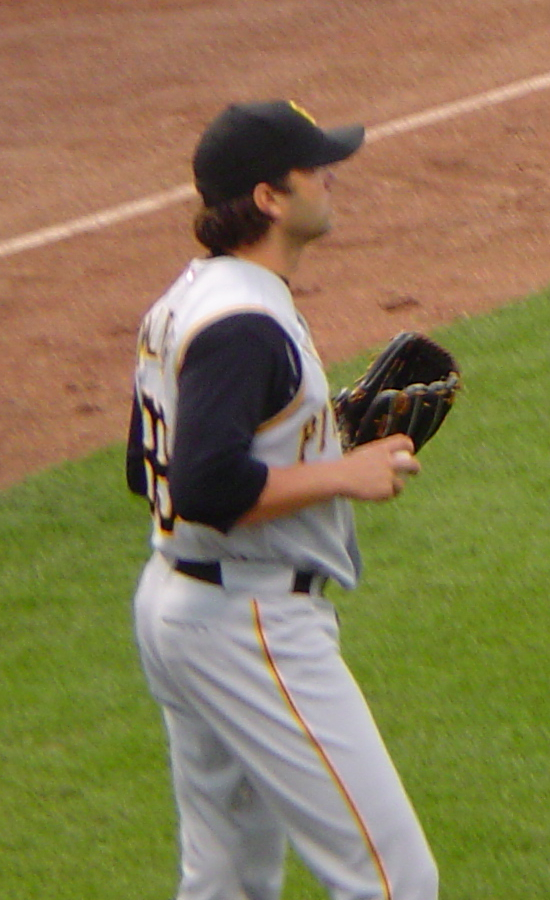
- McLeary with the Pirates in 2006
- Pitcher
- Born: October 26, 1974 (age 51); Kettering, Ohio
- Batted: Right Threw: Right

Professional debut
- MLB: August 22, 2004, for the San Diego Padres
- KBO: March 30, 2008, for the Lotte Giants

Last appearance
- MLB: May 19, 2007, for the Pittsburgh Pirates
- KBO: July 22, 2008, for the Lotte Giants

MLB statistics
- Win–loss record: 2–0
- Earned run average: 5.28
- Strikeouts: 17

KBO statistics
- Win–loss record: 5–5
- Earned run average: 4.60
- Strikeouts: 43
- Stats at Baseball Reference

Former teams
- San Diego Padres (2004); Pittsburgh Pirates (2006–2007); Lotte Giants (2008)

Marty Lee McLeary (born October 26, 1974) is a former Major League Baseball pitcher.

McLeary stands at 6' 5", and weighs 210 pounds. He attended Mount Vernon Nazarene University in Ohio. He made his major league debut on August 22, 2004, with the San Diego Padres. From 2006 to 2007, McLeary pitched in the Pittsburgh Pirates organization, appearing in nine major league games. On August 31, 2006, McLeary allowed two runs in the top 11th inning against the Chicago Cubs and had the bases loaded when he finished the inning; however, the Pirates scored three runs in the bottom of the inning, giving McLeary his first major league win in their 10–9 victory. "He's worked his tail off," teammate Freddy Sanchez (who'd played with McLeary in the Red Sox organization as well) said of his teammate, calling his first win "awesome." McLeary signed with the Lotte Giants in South Korea on January 6, 2008. In August 2008, McLeary signed with the Toronto Blue Jays and was assigned to Double-A New Hampshire. After playing for New Hampshire and the Triple-A Las Vegas 51s in early 2010, McLeary was released and signed by the Milwaukee Brewers organization in June 2010. He retired after the 2010 season.
