= 2006 Houston Astros season =

2006 Houston Astros
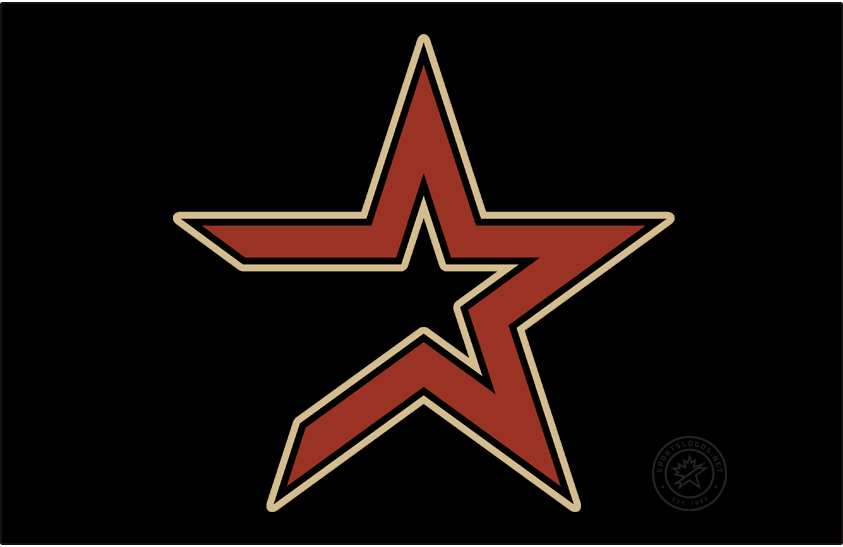
- League: National League
- Division: Central
- Ballpark: Minute Maid Park
- City: Houston, Texas
- Record: 82–80 (.506)
- Divisional place: 2nd
- Owners: Drayton McLane, Jr.
- General managers: Tim Purpura
- Managers: Phil Garner
- Television: KNWS-TV; FSN Southwest (Bill Brown, Jim Deshaies)
- Radio: KTRH (Milo Hamilton, Dave Raymond, Brett Dolan); KLAT (Francisco Ernesto Ruiz, Alex Treviño)
- Stats: ESPN.com; Baseball Reference

The 2006 Houston Astros season was the 45th season for the Major League Baseball (MLB) franchise located in Houston, Texas, their 42nd as the Astros, 45th in the National League (NL), 13th in the NL Central division, and seventh at Minute Maid Park. They entered the season as the defending NL pennant winners for the first time, ultimately ending the season with a 4-games-to-0 loss in the World Series to the Chicago White Sox.

On April 3, pitcher Roy Oswalt made his fourth consecutive Opening Day start for the Astros, who hosted Florida Marlins, and won, 1–0. On April 18, the Astros recaptured an all-time franchise record of .500 (3,507–3,507) for the first time since their expansion era of early 1962. In the amateur draft, the Astros selected catcher Maxwell Sapp in the first round (23rd overall), third baseman Chris Johnson in the fourth round, and pitcher Bud Norris in the sixth round.

Oswalt and first baseman Lance Berkman represented the Astros and played for the National League at the MLB All-Star Game. Phil Garner managed the National League. It the fourth career selection for Berkman and second for Oswalt. Gene Elston, who broadcast for the Colt .45s/Astros from 1962 to 1986, was recognized by the Baseball Hall of Fame with the Ford C. Frick Award.

On July 28, Luke Scott hit for the cycle, to become the first Astros rookie to do so, and for the seventh time overall in franchise history. The Astros drew 3,022,763 in home attendance, the third campaign in club history to entertain at least 3 million fans, and first time since 2004.

The 2006 Astros finished in second place in the NL Central with a record of 82–80, 1½ games behind the eventual World Series-champion St. Louis Cardinals, after losing 3–1 on the road to the Atlanta Braves on the final day of the season. As a result, they missed the playoffs for the first time since 2003. It was their fifth-consecutive finish in second place in the division.

The 2006 season was the final season as members of the National League that the Astros finished as high as second place within their division; in fact, they had placed first or second in 12 of their first 13 seasons in the NL Central. It was also their 13th winning season over the previous 14, with the 2000 season being the lone exception in both cases.

Following the season, retired right-hander Nolan Ryan was the Astros' DHL Hometown Hero selectee, second baseman Craig Biggio was recognized with his first of two consecutive Heart & Hustle Awards, catcher Brad Ausmus won the third Gold Glove Award of his career and shortstop Adam Everett was a Fielding Bible Award winner.

== Offseason ==
=== Summary ===
The Houston Astros concluded the 2005 season as World Series runners-up to the Chicago White Sox in a four-games-to-zero sweep, after having captured their first National League pennant. During the regular season, Houston finished as runners-up in the NL Central division to the St. Louis Cardinals, claiming the NL Wild Card title, later defeating St. Louis in the National League Championship Series (NLCS). Right-hander Roy Oswalt was recognized with the NLCS Most Valuable Player Award (NLCS MVP).

Other Astros garnering awards in 2005 included third baseman Morgan Ensberg with the Silver Slugger Award, Craig Biggio with the Hutch Award, and center fielder Willy Taveras as The Sporting News NL Rookie of the Year, (Note: From 1961–2003, The Sporting News declared one rookie position player and one rookie pitcher from each league, the NL and the American League (AL), for this award. Starting in 2004, one rookie was selected for each league, regardless of position.) and the Players Choice Award winner for NL Outstanding Rookie. Individual statistical achievements included Roger Clemens leading the major leagues in earned run average (1.87 ERA), while Oswalt became the second Astros pitcher to win 20 games in successive campaigns.

After having missed the majority of the 2005 season, Jeff Bagwell did not take the field for 2006, with his arthritic right shoulder rendering him unable to throw. Though he did appear in spring training, the team placed him on the disabled list and he sat out once the regular season was underway.

=== World Baseball Classic ===
Each of the following Astros participated in the inaugural edition of the World Baseball Classic:

Houston Astros in the 2006 WBC
Player	Position	National team	Stats
Willy Taveras	Center fielder	Dominican Republic	
Philip Barzilla	Pitcher	Italy	
Mike Gallo	Pitcher	Italy	
David Rollandini	Pitcher	Italy	
Mark Saccomanno	Third baseman	Italy	
Roger Clemens	Pitcher	United States	
Brad Lidge	Pitcher	United States	
Dan Wheeler	Pitcher	United States	
Carlos Hernández	Pitcher	Venezuela	

== Regular season ==
=== Summary ===
==== April ====
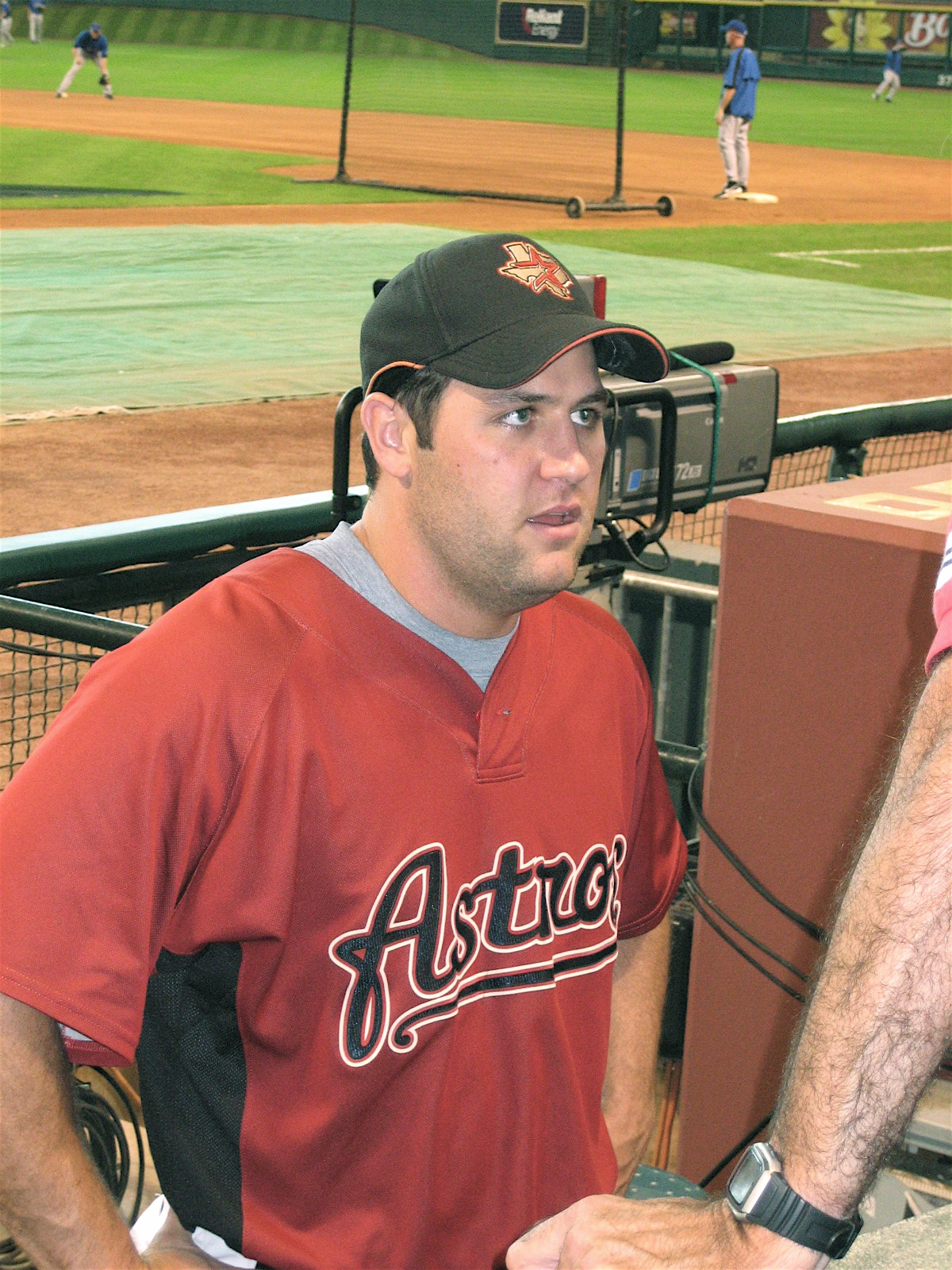
Lance Berkman became the second switch hitter to hit 40 or more home runs in multiple seasons.

Opening Day starting lineup
Uniform	Player	Position
7	Craig Biggio	Second baseman
1	Willy Taveras	Center fielder
17	Lance Berkman	First baseman
14	Morgan Ensberg	Third baseman
4	Preston Wilson	Left fielder
16	Jason Lane	Right fielder
11	Brad Ausmus	Catcher
28	Adam Everett	Shortstop
44	Roy Oswalt	Pitcher
Venue: Minute Maid Park • Houston 1, Florida 0 Sources:

On Opening Day, April 3, righty Roy Oswalt made his fourth consecutive Opening Day start for Houston at Minute Maid Park, outlasting Dontrelle Willis (5 shutout innings) in a pitchers' duel to triumph over the Florida Marlins, 1–0. Oswalt scatted five hits over eight frames and struck out eight. In the bottom of the seventh inning, Craig Biggio doubled and eventually scored on a wild pitch by Joe Borowski with Morgan Ensberg at the plate for the lone run of the bout. Brad Lidge took over for the ninth. Lidge struck out Miguel Cabrera swinging, and then induced Mike Jacobs to ground into a game-ending double play to convert the save.

During the second game of a doubleheader on April 13 at AT&T Park versus the San Francisco Giants, Lance Berkman became the seventh Astros hitter to homer from both sides of the plate. (Note: Succeeded Carlos Beltran on July 1, 2004) Morgan Ensberg commenced a personal season-high 10-game hitting streak, that lasted until April 23. During that time, he posted a batting average of .410, and the Astros went 8–2.

From April 15–21, Morgan Ensberg established a club record by homering over six consecutive contests, (Note: The major league record is eight, by Dale Long (May 19–28, 1956), Don Mattingly (July 8–18, 1987), and Ken Griffey Jr. (July 20–28, 1993).) during a series at the Arizona Diamondbaks, and hosting the Milwaukee Brewers and Pittsburgh Pirates. During the streak, Ensberg hit 7 home runs with 13 runs batted in (RBI), while slashing .480 batting average (12-for-25) /.536 on-base percentage (OBP) / 1.400 slugging percentage (SLG) / 1.936 on-base plus slugging percentage (OPS). After going 1-for-4 (single) with two bases on balls on April 22, he added another home run on April 23, for eight over a span of eight games. Ensberg surpassed five consecutive by Cliff Johnson (August 19 to 24, 1975), and former teammate Carlos Beltrán (August 23 to 27, 2004. (Note: iteria: Longest streak of consecutive games, Playing for HOU, in the regular season, requiring home runs ≥ 1, sorted by most games matching criteria.)

On April 17, Preston Wilson became the first player in club history to earn the platinum sombrero, a mythical award for striking out five times in one game, (Note: For single games, playing for HOU, in the regular season, requiring strikeouts ≥ 4, sorted by descending strikeouts.) also tying the major league record for a nine-inning game. Ensberg and Jason Lane, batting before and after Wilson in the order, respectively, helped picked their teammate by supplying deep drives. Craig Biggio had three hits and doubled as the Astros pulled off an 8–7 triumph over the Milwaukee Brewers.

After 44 years to attain their first World Series entrance, on April 18, the Astros climbed back to an all-time franchise record of .500 (3,507–3,507) for the first time since their expansion era. In a slugfest, the Astros staved off a frenetic 10-run comeback by Milwaukee over the final three frames to hold on for a 13–12 decision. Roy Oswalt (3–0) was the winner in spite of surrendering six runs (four earned) over six innings. Adam Everett sliced three hits and four RBI, Craig Biggio homered (1), collected three hits and three RBI, and Morgan Ensberg went deep twice (6) with three RBI. This was Everett's third career bout of four RBI.

On April 22, the Astros scaled above the .500 winning percentage stratum for the first time since early 1962, led by right-hander Taylor Buchholz, who obtained his first major league victory. Buchholz surrendered just two hits while coming within one out of also earning his first shutout. Brad Lidge struck out Jason Bay looking to preserve the masterpiece, a 3–0 victory over the Pittsburgh Pirates, and earn the save (7). Biggio homered, doubled, stroked three hits, and scored all three tallies. Willy Taveras also collected three safeties.

==== May—June ====
Houston started the season off strong, in club-record fashion, by winning 19 of their first 28 games, a .679 winning percentage. In spite of the auspicious initiation to the campaign, Houston slogged to a 53–67 (.442) showing over the next two-thirds of the campaign, nearly playing themselves out of contention.

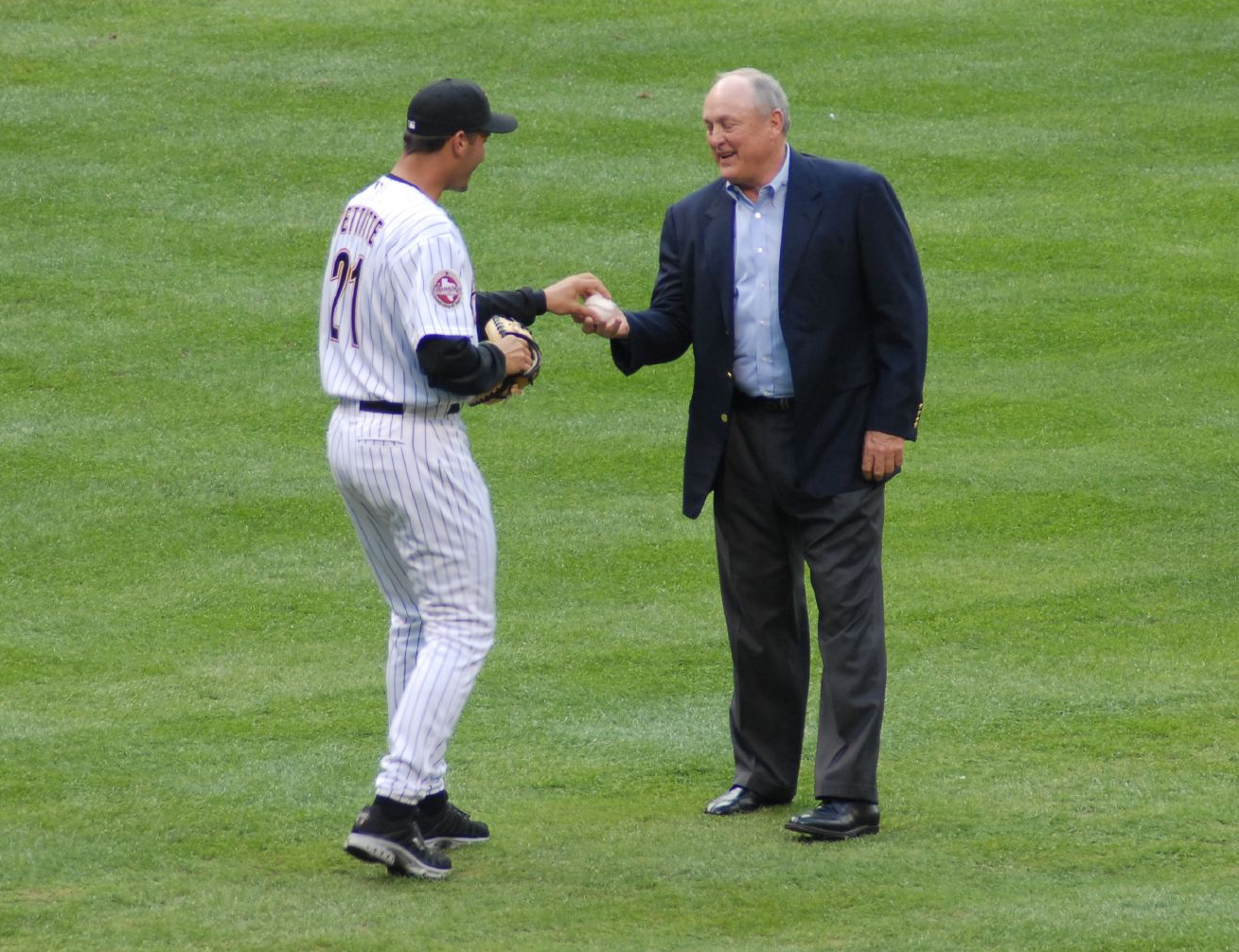
Andy Pettitte with Nolan Ryan in 2006.

Andy Pettitte tossed a three-hit shutout on May 14, his lowest-hit complete game as a member of the Astros, and fifth of his career of three hits or fewer. Pettitte (3–4) whiffed seven and earned a game score of 76. Lance Berkman (13) and Morgan Ensberg (12) each went deep as the Astros prevailed, 3–0, over the Colorado Rockies.

On the verge of losing their sixth consecutive game on May 28, Houston trailed the Pittsburgh Pirates 4–0 heading into the ninth inning. The tied the score thanks in part to two bases-loaded wallsk, and in the 10th inning, Preston Wilson hit the walk-off single to win the game for the Astros.

The Astros and right-hander Roger Clemens agreed to terms on May 31 that brought him back to Houston for the final four months of the season. The total value of the contract amounted to $22 million. Clemens started 19 games and posted a 2.30 earned run average (ERA).

Lance Berkman connected for his 200th career home run on June 21, a solo shot in the bottom of the first at Minute Maid Park off Carlos Silva. During the bottom of the eighth, Jason Lane singled in Preston Wilson for the go-ahead run. Dan Wheeler (1–4) tossed a scoreless eighth to earn his first victory of the season while, in the ninth, Brad Lidge struck out the side to close out his 19th save and preserve the Astros' 4–3 victory over the Minnesota Twins.

On June 25, the Chicago White Sox nearly completed a comeback with Houston ahead, 9–2, after eight strong innings from Roy Oswalt. The Astros won, 10–9 in the 13th inning via an RBI triple from Adam Everett. Tadahito Iguchi, who belted a three-run home run, started the comeback for Chicago.

==== July: Pre-All-Star break ====
On July 3, Lance Berkman homered from both sides of the plate, becoming just the second Astro do so twice during the same season, succeeding Kevin Bass on August 3 and September 2, 1987.

==== MLB All-Star Game ====
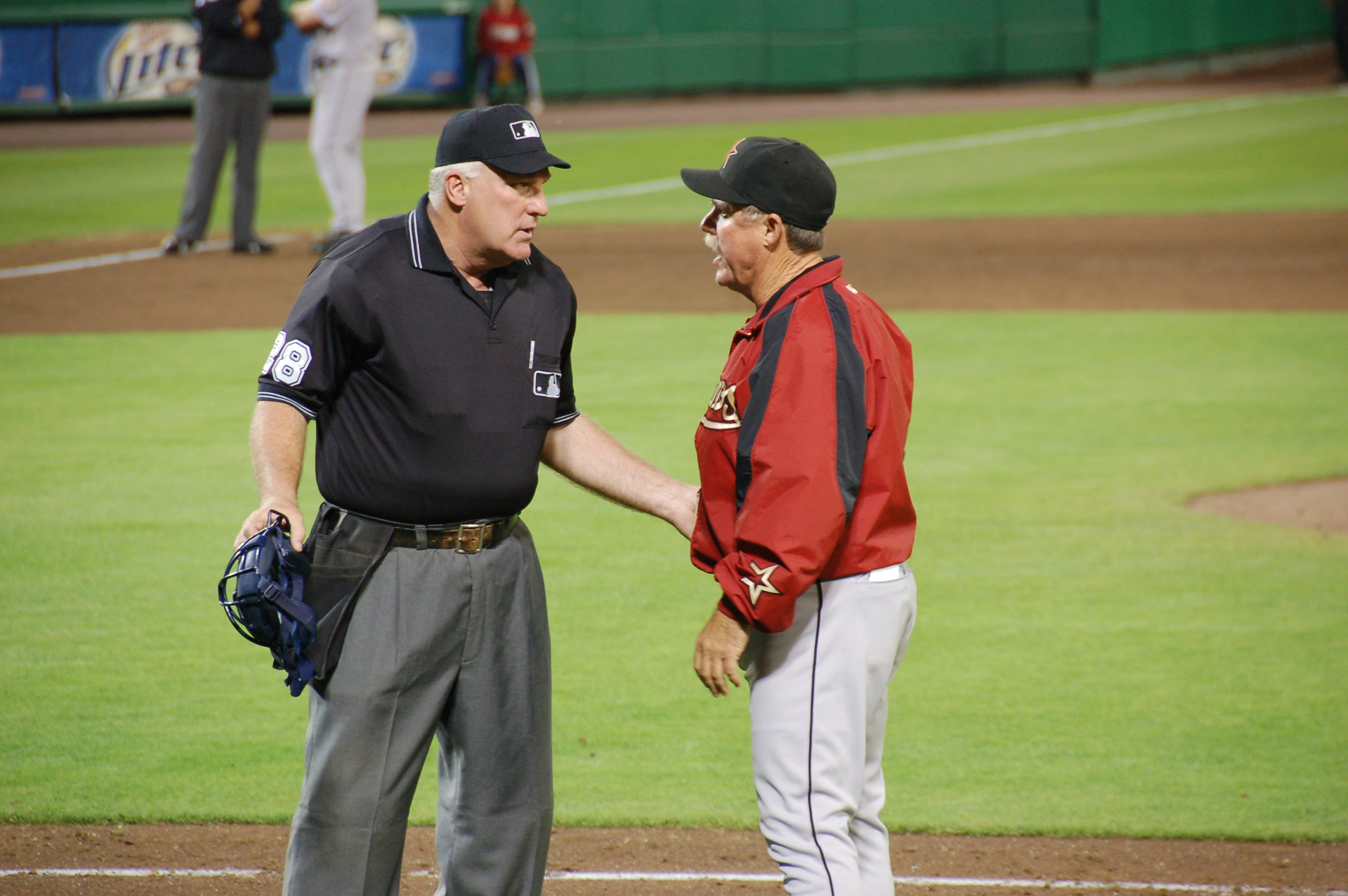
Manager Phil Garner (right) with umpire Larry Young during an Astros game against the Washington Nationals in May, 2006

Astros manager Phil Garner, who piloted the National League for the All-Star Game, was himself formerly a three-time All-Star as a player. He appeared in the 1976, 1980, and 1981 Midsummer Classics, the latter of which was hosted just weeks prior to his trade from the Pirates to the Astros in 1981.

Lance Berkman competed in the Home Run Derby, lasting only through the first round with three home runs, to place seventh overall. This was his third career Derby appearance, first in 2002, and again in 2004. Ryan Howard of Philadelphia, who won the tournament, pulled ahead of runner-up David Wright of the New York Mets in the final round, 5–4, to edge Wright for a 23–22 final tally.

Berkman and Roy Oswalt also represented Houston as players fortify the National League roster for the Mid-Summer Classic, hosted at PNC Park in Pittsburgh. It was the fourth selection for Berkman, and second consecutive for Oswalt. Oswalt entered in relief of NL All-Star starter Brad Penny and tossed one scoreless inning. Berkman substituted for NL starting first baseman Albert Pujols and was hitless in one at bat. During the top of the ninth, Michael Young swatted a two-run triple off right-hander Trevor Hoffman (blown save, loss), allowing the American League (AL) to overtake the NL for the lead, 3–2. Mariano Rivera retired the National League in order in the bottom of the ninth to preserve the win for the AL and earn the save. B. J. Ryan was the winning pitcher, and Young was named the game's Most Valuable Player (MVP).

==== July ====
Led by Andy Pettitte and Adam Everett on July 15 at Dolphins Stadium, the Astros whitewashed the Florida Marlins, 12–0. Pettitte (8–9) scattered five hits and two walks over tossed seven scoreless frames with 10 punchouts, while Everett collected four hits and four RBI. Lance Berkman (25) and Chris Burke (6) went deep. Recalled from the minor leagues to make his first appearance of the season, Luke Scott doubled in Burke as a pinch hitter for Preston Wilson. Everett, who reached base five times, produced his first career four-hit game. It was his third contest of the season with four RBI, and fifth of his career.

Sponsored by DHL, Major League Baseball announced a one-time poll on July 17 among five pre-selected candidates for each major league club. In this format, fans could cast their vote for each MLB team for the player whom they deemed as the greatest in that franchise's history, whether that person was retired or still active. The Astros' full field of nominees included Biggio, former first baseman Jeff Bagwell, pitchers Nolan Ryan and Larry Dierker, and outfielder Jimmy Wynn.

In a rematch of the 300-game winners on July 19 at Wrigley Field, Clemens (2–3) led a 4–2 defeat of Greg Maddux (7–11) and the Chicago Cubs. Craig Biggio launched a Maddux offering in the first for a leadoff home run. Preston Wilson had a two-run double in the sixth off Maddux. Clemens hurled six shutout frames with five whiffs and three hits surrendered.

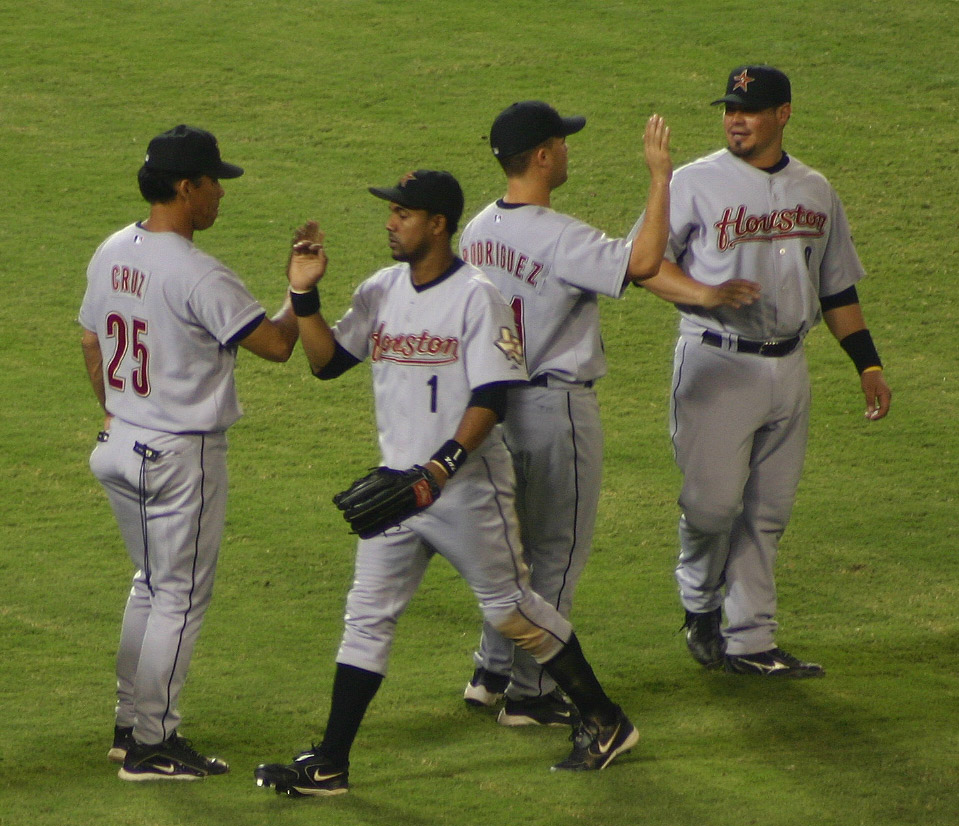
Willy Taveras (#1) authored a club-record 30-game hitting streak in 2006.

Commencing July 27 versus the Cincinnati Reds, center fielder Willy Taveras amassed a 30-game hitting streak to set the Astros' franchise record, which surpassed Jeff Kent's 25-game streak accomplished in 2004. The streak ended on August 29 when Taveras went 0-for-3, including twice hit by pitch against the Milwaukee Brewers. During the streak, Taveras had a .349 batting average, .441 on-base percentage (OBP), and .867 on-base plus slugging percentage (OPS). Taveras' streak ranked as second-longest in the major leagues that season to 35 by Chase Utley of the Philadelphia Phillies, whose transpired from June 23–August 3. (Note: Longest streak of consecutive games, in 2006, in the regular season, requiring hits ≥ 1, sorted by most games matching criteria.)

==== Luke Scott's cycle ====
On July 28, right fielder Luke Scott hit for the cycle, which spanned six at bats and 11 innings in an 8–7 loss to the Arizona Diamondbacks. In the fourth inning, Scott homered, then hit a triple onto Tal's Hill in the fifth, and doubled in the seventh. He grounded out in the ninth inning, but got the single in his final at bat during the 11th inning. Scott's home run was also the first of his career, hit to deep left field off Enrique González, to score Mike Lamb and Aubrey Huff. It was also the first of each of a four-hit and five-RBI game for the rookie.

Having occurred in the "reverse" order of extra-base hits, (Note: Home run, triple, double, and single.) Scott's was a "reverse," or "unnatural cycle," just the seventh such accomplishment by a major leaguer. It was the fourth in National League history, and first since Jackie Robinson did so as a member of the Brooklyn Dodgers on August 29, 1948.

Scott's cycle was the first-ever by an Astros rookie, and first by a Houston Astro since teammate Craig Biggio did so on April 8, 2002. The next Astros player to hit for cycle was Brandon Barnes on July 19, 2013.

==== Rest of July ====
The day after hitting for the cycle, on July 29, Scott received two intentional base on balls in a single bout for the first time in his career.

==== August ====
From August 2–11, Morgan Ensberg coaxed a base on balls in nine consecutive games, for 11 total.

Brad Ausmus cranked a grand slam on August 5 to pave the way for a 9–3 triumph over Arizona, Craig Biggio attained the 2,900th hit of his career, while Roger Clemens (3–4) earned his 344th victory, Houston's (53–57) fourth victory in five bouts. Ausmus' (2nd home run) put the Astros in the lead for good when he hit the grand during the top of the second to break a scoreless tie. Clemens tossed a quality start (7 IP, 3 ER, 1 BB, 5 K). Luke Scott assembled four hits, a two-run homer, and two runs; Aubrey Huff added a solo bomb, two hits and two runs; while Willy Taveras collected two hits and a run scored. This was Scott's second four-hit game.

Manager Phil Garner earned his 900th career victory on August 9, while right-hander Roy Oswalt hit his lone career home run as a batter. Aubrey Huff connected for his fifth multi-home run game, first as an Astro, and established a career-high with 6 RBI.

Two days after Oswalt, a starting pitcher, connected for his first major league home run as a hitter, on August 11, Andy Pettitte followed suit. Pettitte's was a game-tying blast during the fourth inning off Chan Ho Park. On the mound, Pettitte surrendered three hits and two runs over seven frames, whiffing 10. It was his tenth career 10-strikeout performance, his second of the season, and second as a member of the Astros. Lance Berkman collected three hits and homered (31). Brad Lidge record a strikeout and induced Adrián González to ground into a game-ending double play for the save (26) and preserve a 4–2 triumph over the San Diego Padres.

Luke Scott staged a personal season-high 10 game hitting-streak through August 5–15, during which he batted .556 / .610 on-base percentage / .833 slugging percentage, four doubles, two home runs, five RBI and five BB.

On August 16, Pettitte hurled a four-hit, one-run complete game, his seventh of four hits or fewer.

On August 29, Jason Lane hit his first major league grand slam, and the ninth pinch-hit grand slam in club history, succeeding Gregg Zaun on June 27, 2002. His 14th home run for the season, Lane's blast was off Danny Kolb during the sixth inning, and capped a 10–3 win over the Milwaukee Brewers. Luke Scott (4) and Craig Biggio (17) also homered, and Chad Qualls (5–3) earned the victory in relief.

On August 31, Brad Lidge converted his 28th save of the season, and 100th of his career. Lidge became the third Astros reliever to record 100 saves, joining Dave Smith and Billy Wagner. Lidge yielded one hit in an otherwise clean ninth to close out a 5–3 triumph over the Brewers. Craig Biggio (18) homered, Brad Ausmus (14) and Willy Taveras (17) doubled, and Andy Pettitte (13–13) allowed two runs over seven innings to earn the victory.

==== September ====
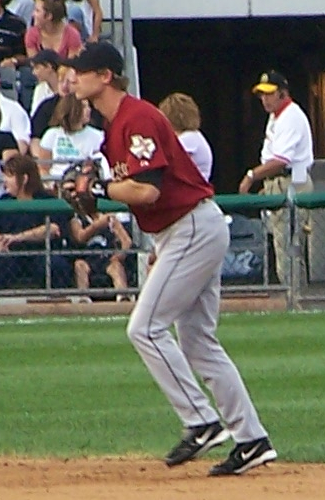
Shortstop Adam Everett became the first Astros player to win the Fielding Bible Award.

Roger Clemens, making his 15th start on September 4, faced rookie Cole Hamels of Philadelphia at Citizens Bank Park. Through three innings, Clemens had struck four and surrendered just one hit—to the pitcher Hamels. Clemens became uncharacteristically wild in the fourth by issuing a leadoff base on balls to Shane Victorino, hit Chase Utley, and walked Ryan Howard to load the bases. Another walk with one out to Jeff Conine forced home a run, but a double play ground ball then ended the frame to avert further damage. Clemens then departed early due to a strained groin. In the sixth inning, with his spot due in the lineup, manager Phil Garner chose rookie Charlton Jimerson to pinch hit for Clemens. Jimerson, who had never taken a plate appearance in the major leagues, had made just one appearance as a defensive substitution for his major league debut nearly one year prior, on September 14, 2005. Meanwhile, Hamels was cruising with a perfect game in progress. On a count of two balls and one strike, Jimerson launched the next Hamels offering deep over the center field fence for his first career home run, simultaneously ending the bid for a perfect game, no-hitter, and shutout after 5 2/3 innings, and tying the contest, 1–1. (Note: Jimerson became the third Astros player to hit a home run in his first major-league at-bat, preceded by José Sosa on July 30, 1975, and Dave Matranga on June 27, 2003, and succeeded by Mark Saccomanno on September 8, 2008.) The contest ended tied through regulation, 2–2. Astros reliever Dave Borkowski assumed the bottom of the tenth with the scored still tied. However, after getting two outs, Utley blasted a walk-off home run to end it, 3–2.

On September 13, 2006, Lance Berkman became just the second switch hitter in Major League history to crank 40 or more homers over multiple seasons, with Mickey Mantle being the first.

On September 20, Houston, in second place, trailed the St. Louis Cardinals by 8 1/2 games, while they commenced their longest winning streak of the campaign, at nine games. The winning streak brought Houston's record to three games over .500.

Craig Biggio launched a late-inning rally on September 22, before delivering the walk-off blow to St. Louis, his 14th career walk-off hit. Biggio's single capped a 6–5 decision. Morgan Ensberg (23) homered in the bottom of the third. The Cardinals led, 5–2, going into the bottom of the eighth. Biggio singled in Orlando Palmeiro and Eric Bruntlett off Adam Wainwright. In the bottom of the ninth, facing Braden Looper, Palmeiro singled in Adam Everett for the game-tying score. Biggio then singled home Palmeiro for the game-winner. For the day, Biggio collected three hits, a double, three RBI, and a stolen base. Biggio's walk-off hit placed him as the team's all-time leader, passing José Cruz (13).

Luke Scott swatted his first walk-off home run on September 23, his second longball of the contest, and the Astros' second-successive walk-off victory. It was Scott's first career multi-home run game, and second five-RBI game, which led a 7–4 decision over St. Louis. Scott's second blast picked up Dan Wheeler (3–5), off whom David Eckstein had doubled in José Vizcaíno for the game-tying score during the top of the ninth. Lance Berkman amassed four hits, his 13th career bout with as many. This was also Houston's third successive contest won in their final at bat, each against St. Louis. Biggio's walk-off single and Scott's walk-off home run on consecutive dates summed the totality of the Astros' walk-off hits for the season.

Right-hander Roy Oswalt delivered a 5–0 record, 1.85 ERA, and 1.008 walks plus hits per inning pitched (WHIP) over six starts in September. He fanned 39 in 43 2/3 innings pitched and was recognized as National League (NL) Pitcher of the Month for the second time in his career. He had first won in August 2002, and became the first Astros hurler to garner the trophy since Andy Pettitte one year earlier in September 2005.

The Astros won 10 of 12 bouts to gain eight games over eight days, and pull within a 1/2 game of the Cardinals with just three games remaining in the regular season. However, the Astros were unable to inch closer following losses in two of their final three to the Atlanta Braves.

==== Performance overview ====
The Astros concluded the 2006 season with an 82–80 record, trailing the St. Louis Cardinals—that year's World Series champion—by 1 1/2 games. Meanwhile, Houston trailed the Los Angeles Dodgers by six games for the Wild Card title. For the third successive campaign, Houston wound up runners-up in the NL Central to the Cardinals, and, for the second time in four seasons, Houston missed the playoffs by fewer than 2 games, likewise following the 2003 season. This was the first of nine consecutive seasons of missing the playoffs through 2014, a streak that lengthy had last occurred from 1987 to 1996. The Astros drew 3,022,763 in home attendance, the third campaign in club history to entertain at least 3 million fans, and first time since 2004.

However, this represented a sixth consecutive winning campaign for Houston, a club record. In continuation of a long era of regular-season success, since the inception of the NL Central division in 1994, Houston had concluded the regular season in either first or second place twelve times in 13 seasons, excluding the 2000 campaign. Furthermore, during a span of 17 seasons commencing in 1992, the 2006 campaign represented the fourteenth of 15 having posted a .500 winning percentage or higher.

Retired right-hander Nolan Ryan was unveiled as the Astros' DHL Hometown Hero on October 1 based on a fan vote available during the summer. The award was intended to recognize each MLB team's marquee player throughout all their history, including past and present legends. In fact, Ryan received the same award as a Texas Ranger, the only player who represented two teams. The Astros' full field of nominees included Biggio and former players first baseman Jeff Bagwell, outfielder Jimmy Wynn, and pitcher Larry Dierker.

Second baseman Craig Biggio concluded his 19th major league campaign with 2,930 hits. Just 70 away from the 3,000 hit club, the small margin implied inevitability of realizing the milestone hit the following season. Including hits, Biggio held many career franchise records. Biggio was recognized with the second iteration of the Heart & Hustle Award, succeeding David Eckstein, winner of the first.

Roy Oswalt won the NL earned run average title (2.98 ERA) to succeed Clemens (1.87 ERA in 2005) as the second-consecutive Astro to lead the league. The duo also joined Mike Scott (2.22 in 1986) and Nolan Ryan (2.76 in 1987) as Astros pitcher who have led the league in ERA in consecutive seasons. The seventh ERA title overall in franchise history, Oswalt was preceded by J. R. Richard (2.71 in 1979), Ryan (twice, first 1.69 in 1981), Scott in 1986, Ryan again in 1987, and Danny Darwin in (2.21 in 1990). Oswalt also excelled with control, yielding career-bests in ERA-qualified seasons with an NL-leading 4.37 strikeout-to-walk ratio (K/BB), while surrendering just 1.5 bases on balls per nine innings pitched (BB/9), good for second in the NL.

Lance Berkman produced 45 home runs (Note: Tying Chipper Jones in 1999.) and 136 runs batted in (RBI) to establish National League records among switch hitters in both categories, overtaking George Davis with the 1897 New York Giants for the RBI record (135). Berkman also set the franchise RBI record, surpassing Jeff Bagwell's 135 RBI in 1997. Thus, Berkman was recognized as team Most Valuable Player (MVP) for the fourth time, joining José Cruz and Bagwell (six times)—the latter of whom was a teammate—to win as many times.

Brad Lidge became the first reliever in club history to record 100 strikeouts each over three consecutive seasons, surpassing Octavio Dotel, who logged two consecutive in 2001 and 2002. Moreover, Lidge joined Billy Wagner as the second relief pitcher in club history to record three total 100-strikeout campaigns. (Note: Number of seasons player meets criteria, At least 80% games in relief, playing for HOU, in the regular season, requiring strikeouts ≥ 100, sorted by descending instances.)

Two Astros received accolades for defensive excellence. Catcher Brad Ausmus was recognized with his third Gold Glove, first since 2002, and all with the Astros. Other previous players who were multiple winners for Houston included third baseman Doug Rader (1970–1974), center fielder César Cedeño (1972–1976), and Biggio (1994–1997 at second base). Meanwhile, shortstop Adam Everett recorded a .990 fielding percentage, the fourth-best in major league history at the position. Hence, Everett become the first Astro to receive the Fielding Bible Award.

=== Standings ===
==== National League Central ====
NL Central
Team	W	L	Pct.	GB	Home	Road
St. Louis Cardinals	83	78	.516	—	49‍–‍31	34‍–‍47
Houston Astros	82	80	.506	1½	44‍–‍37	38‍–‍43
Cincinnati Reds	80	82	.494	3½	42‍–‍39	38‍–‍43
Milwaukee Brewers	75	87	.463	8½	48‍–‍33	27‍–‍54
Pittsburgh Pirates	67	95	.414	16½	43‍–‍38	24‍–‍57
Chicago Cubs	66	96	.407	17½	36‍–‍45	30‍–‍51

==== Record versus opponents ====
National League

2006 National League record Source: MLB Standings Grid – 2006
Team	AZ	ATL	CHC	CIN	COL	FLA	HOU	LAD	MIL	NYM	PHI	PIT	SD	SF	STL	WAS	AL
Arizona	—	6–1	4–2	4–2	12–7	2–4	4–5	8–10	3–3	1–6	1–5	5–1	9–10	8–11	4–3	1–5	4–11
Atlanta	1–6	—	6–1	4–3	3–3	11–8	3–4	3–3	2–4	7–11	7–11	3–3	7–2	3–4	4–2	10–8	5–10
Chicago	2–4	1–6	—	10–9	2–4	2–4	7–8	4–2	8–8	3–3	2–5	6–9	0–7	2–4	11–8	2–4	4–11
Cincinnati	2–4	3–4	9–10	—	5–1	4–2	10–5	0–6	9–10	3–4	2–4	9–7	2–4	2–5	9–6	5–1	6-9
Colorado	7–12	3–3	4–2	1–5	—	3–3	4–2	4–15	2–4	1–5	3–4	3–3	10–9	10–8	2–7	8–0	11–4
Florida	4–2	8–11	4–2	2–4	3–3	—	3–4	1–5	7–0	8–11	6–13	5–2	3–3	3–3	1–5	11–7	9–9
Houston	5–4	4–3	8–7	5–10	2–4	4-3	—	3–3	10–5	2–4	2–4	13–3	3–3	1–5	9–7	4–4	7–11
Los Angeles	10–8	3–3	2–4	6–0	15–4	5–1	3–3	—	4–2	3–4	4–3	6–4	5–13	13–6	0–7	4–2	5–10
Milwaukee	3–3	4–2	8–8	10–9	4–2	0–7	5–10	2–4	—	3–3	5–1	7–9	4–3	6–3	7–9	1–5	6–9
New York	6–1	11–7	3–3	4–3	5–1	11–8	4–2	4–3	3–3	—	11–8	5–4	5–2	3–3	4–2	12–6	6–9
Philadelphia	5-1	11–7	5–2	4–2	4–3	13–6	4–2	3–4	1–5	8–11	—	3–3	2–4	5–1	3–3	9–10	5–13
Pittsburgh	1–5	3–3	9–6	7–9	3–3	2–5	3–13	4–6	9–7	4–5	3–3	—	1–5	6–1	6–9	3–3	3–12
San Diego	10–9	2–7	7–0	4–2	9–10	3–3	3–3	13–5	3–4	2–5	4–2	5–1	—	7–12	4–2	5–1	7–8
San Francisco	11–8	4–3	4–2	5–2	8–10	3–3	5–1	6–13	3–6	3–3	1–5	1–6	12–7	—	1–4	1–5	8–7
St. Louis	3–4	2–4	8–11	6–9	7–2	5-1	7–9	7–0	9–7	2–4	3–3	9–6	2–4	4–1	—	4–3	5–10
Washington	5–1	8–10	4–2	1–5	0–8	7-11	4–4	2–4	5–1	6–12	10–9	3–3	1–5	5–1	3–4	—	7–11

=== Transactions ===
- March 30, 2006: Cody Ransom was purchased by the Houston Astros from the Seattle Mariners.
- July 12, 2006: Aubrey Huff was traded by the Tampa Bay Devil Rays with cash to the Houston Astros for Ben Zobrist and Mitch Talbot (minors).

=== Roster ===
2006 Houston Astros
Roster
Pitchers: 37 Matt Albers; 38 Ezequiel Astacio; 41 Brandon Backe; 56 Phil Barzilla; 58 Dave Borkowski; 39 Taylor Buchholz; 22 Roger Clemens; 45 Mike Gallo; 53 Jason Hirsh; 54 Brad Lidge; 47 Trever Miller; 64 Fernando Nieve; 44 Roy Oswalt; 21 Andy Pettitte; 50 Chad Qualls; 51 Wandy Rodríguez; 43 Chris Sampson; 36 Russ Springer; 35 Dan Wheeler	Catchers: 11 Brad Ausmus; 59 J. R. House; 13 Eric Munson; 46 Humberto Quintero; Infielders: 17 Lance Berkman; 7 Craig Biggio; 10 Eric Bruntlett; 2 Chris Burke; 14 Morgan Ensberg; 28 Adam Everett; 26 Mike Lamb; 23 Joe McEwing	Outfielders: 9 Aubrey Huff; 52 Charlton Jimerson; 16 Jason Lane; 19 Orlando Palmeiro; 30 Luke Scott; 1 Willy Taveras; 4 Preston Wilson; Other batters: 56 Héctor Giménez	Manager: 3 Phil Garner; Coaches: 6 Mark Bailey (bullpen); 15 Cecil Cooper (bench); 25 José Cruz (first base); 8 Gary Gaetti (hitting); 48 Jim Hickey (pitching); 29 Doug Mansolino (third base)

== Player statistics ==
Table legend
League leader
League top ten
Team leader

=== Batting ===
Note: G = Games played; AB = At bats; R = Runs; H = Hits; 2B = Doubles; 3B = Triples; HR = Home runs; RBI = Runs batted in; SB = Stolen bases; BB = Walks; AVG = Batting average; SLG = Slugging percentage

Player	G	AB	R	H	2B	3B	HR	RBI	SB	BB	AVG	SLG
Craig Biggio	145	548	79	135	33	0	21	62	3	40	.246	.422
Lance Berkman	152	536	95	169	29	0	45	136	3	98	.315	.621
Willy Taveras	149	529	83	147	19	5	1	30	33	34	.278	.338
Adam Everett	150	514	52	123	28	6	6	59	9	34	.239	.352
Brad Ausmus	139	439	37	101	16	1	2	39	3	45	.230	.285
Preston Wilson	102	390	40	105	22	2	9	55	6	22	.269	.405
Morgan Ensberg	127	387	67	91	17	1	23	58	1	101	.235	.463
Mike Lamb	126	381	70	117	22	3	12	45	2	35	.307	.475
Chris Burke	123	366	58	101	23	1	9	40	11	27	.276	.418
Jason Lane	112	288	44	58	10	0	15	45	1	49	.201	.392
Aubrey Huff	68	224	31	56	10	1	13	38	0	26	.250	.478
Luke Scott	65	214	31	72	19	6	10	37	2	30	.336	.621
Eric Munson	53	141	10	28	6	0	5	19	0	11	.199	.348
Eric Bruntlett	73	119	11	33	8	0	0	10	3	13	.277	.345
Orlando Palmeiro	103	119	12	30	6	1	0	17	0	6	.252	.319
Humberto Quintero	11	21	2	7	2	0	0	2	0	1	.333	.429
J.R. House	4	9	0	0	0	0	0	0	0	0	.000	.000
Charlton Jimerson	17	6	2	2	0	0	1	1	2	0	.333	.833
Joe McEwing	7	6	0	0	0	0	0	0	0	0	.000	.000
Héctor Giménez	2	2	0	0	0	0	0	0	0	0	.000	.000
Pitchers		282	11	32	5	0	2	15	0	13	.113	.152
Team totals	162	5521	735	1407	275	27	174	708	79	585	.255	.409

=== Pitching ===
Note: W = Wins; L = Losses; ERA = Earned run average; G = Games pitched; GS = Games started; SV = Saves; IP = Innings pitched; H = Hits allowed; R = Runs allowed; ER = Earned runs allowed; BB = Walks allowed; SO = Strikeouts

Player	W	L	ERA	G	GS	SV	IP	H	R	ER	BB	SO
Roy Oswalt	15	8	2.98	33	32	0	220.2	220	76	73	38	166
Andy Pettitte	14	13	4.20	36	35	0	214.1	238	114	100	70	178
Wandy Rodríguez	9	10	5.64	30	24	0	135.2	154	96	85	63	98
Roger Clemens	7	6	2.30	19	19	0	113.1	89	34	29	29	102
Taylor Buchholz	6	10	5.89	22	19	0	113.0	107	80	74	34	77
Fernando Nieve	3	3	4.20	40	11	0	96.1	87	46	45	41	70
Chad Qualls	7	3	3.76	81	0	0	88.2	76	38	37	28	56
Brad Lidge	1	5	5.28	78	0	32	75.0	69	47	44	36	104
Dan Wheeler	3	5	2.52	75	0	9	71.1	58	22	20	24	68
Dave Borkowski	3	2	4.69	40	0	0	71.0	70	38	37	23	52
Russ Springer	1	1	3.47	72	0	0	59.2	46	23	23	16	46
Trever Miller	2	3	3.02	70	0	1	50.2	42	17	17	13	56
Jason Hirsh	3	4	6.04	9	9	0	44.2	48	32	30	22	29
Brandon Backe	3	2	3.77	8	8	0	43.0	43	18	18	18	19
Chris Sampson	2	1	2.12	12	3	0	34.0	25	10	8	5	15
Mike Gallo	1	2	6.06	23	0	0	16.1	28	11	11	7	7
Matt Albers	0	2	6.00	4	2	0	15.0	17	10	10	7	11
Ezequiel Astacio	2	0	11.12	6	0	0	5.2	7	7	7	6	6
Philip Barzilla	0	0	0.00	1	0	0	0.1	1	0	0	0	0
Team totals	82	80	4.08	162	162	42	1468.2	1425	719	666	480	1160

== Awards and achievements ==
=== Offensive achievements ===
==== Hitting for the cycle ====
Date	Player	H / AB	R	1B	2B	3B	HR	BI	Other	Score	Opponent	Box
July 28	Luke Scott	4-for-6	1	11	7	5	4	5		7–8 (11)	Arizona Diamondbacks	
Scott: 2B (4) • 3B (1) • HR (1) • RBI (7)

==== Grand slams ====
No.	Date	Astros batter	Venue	Inning	Pitcher	Opposing team	Box
1	August 5	Brad Ausmus	Chase Field	2 (Note: Tied score or took lead)	Dustin Nippert	Arizona Diamondbacks	
2	August 29	Jason Lane (Note: 1st MLB grand slam) (Note: Pinch hitter)	Miller Park	8	Danny Kolb	Milwaukee Brewers	

=== Career honors ===
- DHL Hometown Hero: Nolan Ryan

Houston Colt .45s/Astros Frick broadcast award
Broadcaster		Start	Finish	HOF
Gene Elston	Biography	1962	1986	Class
See also: Ford C. Frick Award • Sources:

=== Annual awards ===
2006 Houston Astros award winners
Name of award		Recipient	Ref
Darryl Kile Good Guy Award		Brad Lidge	
Fielding Bible Award	Shortstop	Adam Everett	
Fred Hartman Award for Long and Meritorious Service to Baseball		Dan Cunningham	
Gold Glove Award	Catcher	Brad Ausmus	
Heart & Hustle Award		Craig Biggio	
Houston-Area Major League Player of the Year	TBR	Carl Crawford	
Houston Astros	Most Valuable Player (MVP)	Lance Berkman	
Houston Astros	Pitcher of the Year	Roy Oswalt	
Houston Astros	Rookie of the Year	Luke Scott	
MLB All-Star Game	Home Run Derby contestant	Lance Berkman	
MLB All-Star Game	Reserve first baseman	Lance Berkman	
MLB All-Star Game	Reserve pitcher	Roy Oswalt	
MLB All-Star Game	Manager	Phil Garner	
National League (NL) Pitcher of the Month	September	Roy Oswalt	

Other awards results

Name of award	Voting recipient(s) (Team)	Ref.
NL Cy Young	1st—Webb (ARI) • 4th—Oswalt (HOU)	
NL Most Valuable Player	1st—Howard (PHI) • 3rd—Berkman (HOU)	
NL Manager of the Year	1st—Girardi (FLA) • 7th—Garner (HOU)	

=== League leaders ===
NL batting leaders

- Sacrifice hits: Roy Oswalt (20)

NL pitching leaders

- Earned run average (ERA): Roy Oswalt (2.98)
- Games started: Andy Pettitte (35)
- Strikeout-to-walk ratio (K/BB): Roy Oswalt (4.27)

== Minor league system ==
Level	Team	League	Manager
AAA	Round Rock Express	Pacific Coast League	Jackie Moore
AA	Corpus Christi Hooks	Texas League	Dave Clark
A	Salem Avalanche	Carolina League	Jim Pankovits
A	Lexington Legends	South Atlantic League	Jack Lind
A-Short Season	Tri-City ValleyCats	New York–Penn League	Gregg Langbehn
Rookie	Greeneville Astros	Appalachian League	Iván DeJesús

LEAGUE CHAMPIONS: Corpus Christi

Awards

- All-Star Futures Game
  - Jason Hirsh, RHP
  - Hunter Pence, OF
- Baseball America Minor League All-Star Team—Outfielder: Hunter Pence
- Houston Astros Minor League Player of the Year: Hunter Pence
- Pacific Coast League All-Star: Jason Hirsh, RHP
- Pacific Coast League Pitcher of the Year: Jason Hirsh, RHP
- Texas League Pitcher of the Year: Matt Albers, RHP
- Triple-A All-Star: Jason Hirsh, RHP

== See also ==
- Consecutive game hitting streaks of 30 or more games
- List of Major League Baseball All-Star Game managers
- List of Major League Baseball annual ERA leaders
- List of Major League Baseball players to hit for the cycle
- List of Major League Baseball players with a home run in their first major league at bat
