= Willy Taveras =

Dominican baseball player (born 1981)

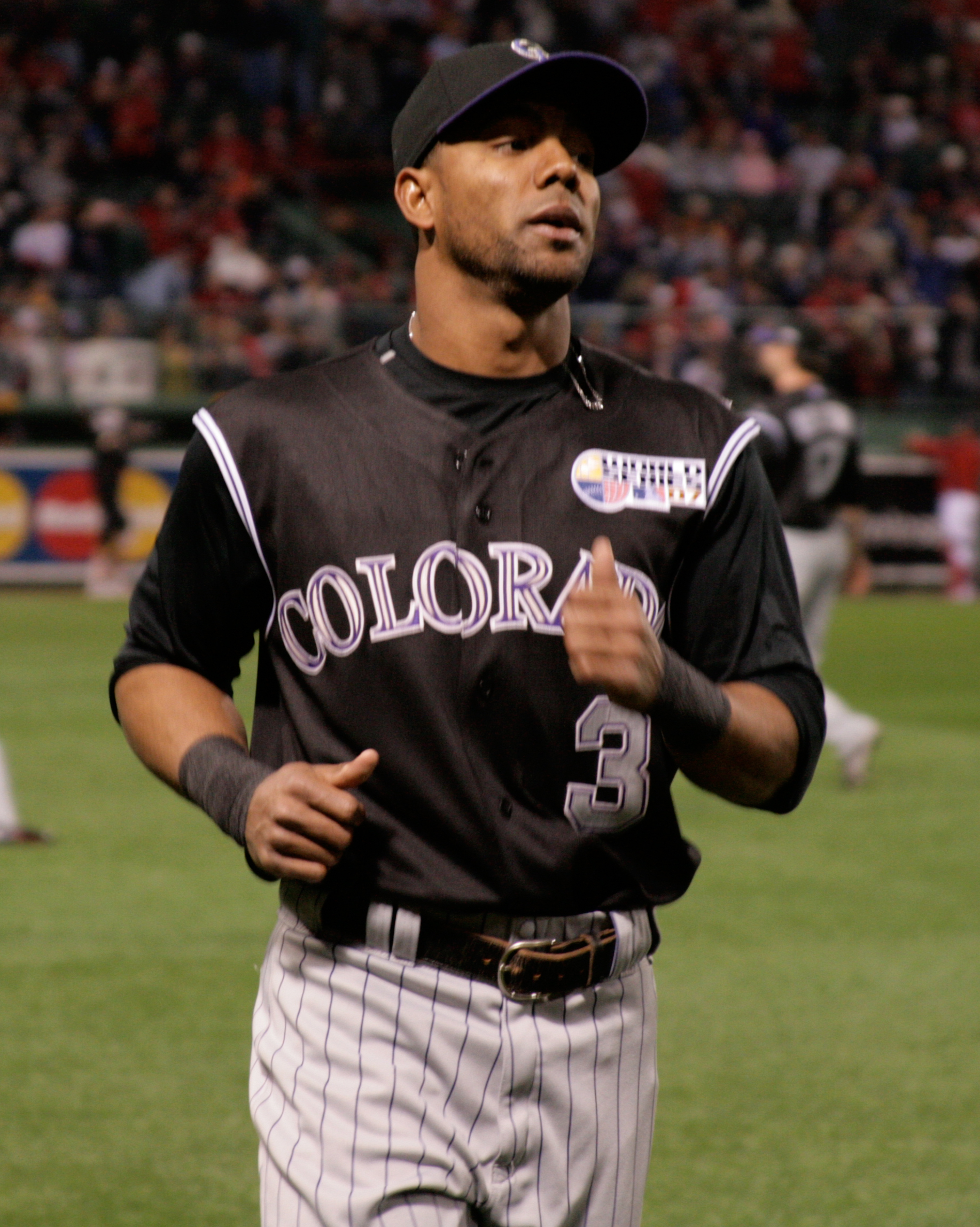
- Taveras during the 2007 World Series
- Center fielder
- Born: December 25, 1981 (age 44); Tenares, Dominican Republic
- Batted: Right Threw: Right

MLB debut
- September 6, 2004, for the Houston Astros

Last MLB appearance
- May 15, 2010, for the Washington Nationals

MLB statistics
- Batting average: .274
- Home runs: 8
- Runs batted in: 128
- Stolen bases: 195
- Stats at Baseball Reference

Teams
- Houston Astros (2004–2006); Colorado Rockies (2007–2008); Cincinnati Reds (2009); Washington Nationals (2010)

Career highlights and awards
- NL stolen base leader (2008)

Willy Taveras (born December 25, 1981) is a Dominican former professional baseball center fielder. He played a total of seven seasons in Major League Baseball (MLB) for the Houston Astros, Colorado Rockies, Cincinnati Reds, and Washington Nationals.

As a rookie in 2005, Taveras was instrumental in the Astros' first-ever league pennant win and World Series appearances. Behind his hitting, speed, and defense, Taveras won the Players Choice Award for National League (NL) Outstanding Rookie, the Sporting News NL Rookie of the Year, and a selection to the Topps All-Star Rookie Team.

== Professional career ==
=== Houston Astros ===
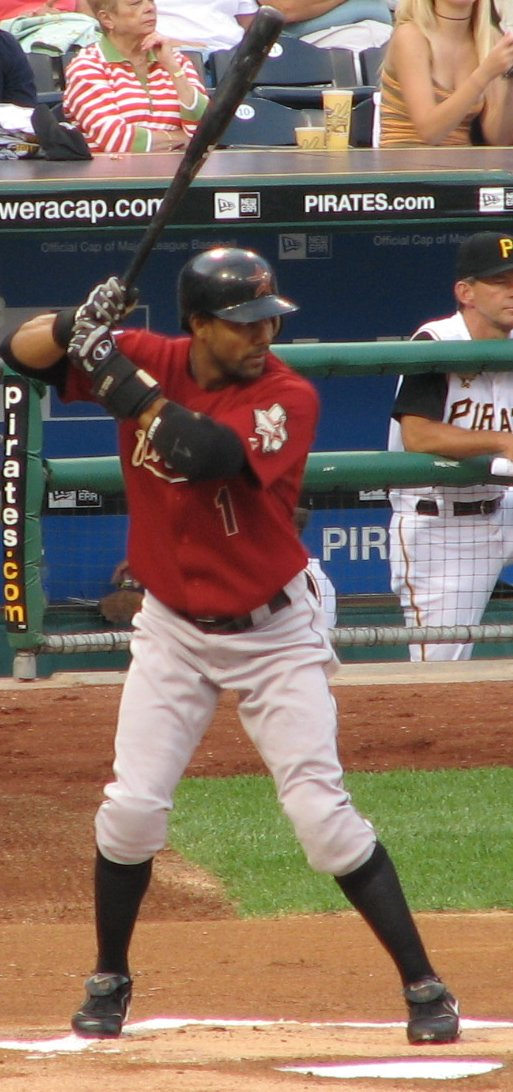
Taveras with the Astros in 2006.

Taveras made his major league debut as a member of the Houston Astros late in the 2004 season, appearing in 10 games, primarily as a pinch runner.

In 2005, Taveras became the Astros' starting center fielder as a rookie, replacing Carlos Beltrán, who had signed as a free agent with the New York Mets in the prior offseason. Taveras batted .291 while leading the majors in infield hits (71), bunt hits (31), and singles (152), and was tops among rookies in runs (82), hits (172), and stolen bases (34; 6th in the National League, NL).

In Game 4 of the 2005 National League Championship Series (NLCS) against the St. Louis Cardinals, Taveras entered in the seventh inning as a pinch runner and scored the winning run on a short sacrifice fly to center field. In the eighth, Taveras' catch while running up Tal's Hill deep in center field at Minute Maid Park ended the inning and preserved a 2–1 lead.

Following the season, Taveras was named in the Players Choice Awards as the NL Outstanding Rookie. He also won the Sporting News NL Rookie of the Year Award and selection to the Topps All-Star Rookie Team. For the Baseball Writers' Association of America (BBWAA) awards, Taveras finished second to Ryan Howard of the Philadelphia Phillies for the NL Rookie of the Year Award.

In 2006, Taveras' batting average regressed to .278, though he again led the majors in bunt hits (21) and had 33 stolen bases (10th in the NL), but just 30 RBI. Taveras had a 30-game hitting streak that ended August 29, 2006, during a game in which he was hit twice by Milwaukee Brewers pitcher Tomo Ohka. Taveras' streak is a franchise record, breaking the record of 25 previously held by Jeff Kent. The streak made him part of a rare club of less than a hundred to have hit in thirty straight games. Within that streak, Taveras had a streak of singles in 28 consecutive games, tying a National League record set by Willie Davis in 1969. As of 2020, Taveras and Davis still hold the league record.

=== Colorado Rockies ===
On December 12, 2006, Taveras was traded along with Taylor Buchholz and Jason Hirsh by the Astros to the Colorado Rockies for pitchers Jason Jennings and Miguel Asencio.

During the 2007 regular season, Taveras hit .320, including an MLB-leading 27 bunt singles, 2 home runs, 24 RBIs, 33 stolen bases, and caught stealing 9 times. He was part of the World Series roster after making a big play in the NLCS vs the Arizona Diamondbacks. In the World Series, the Rockies were swept by the Boston Red Sox.

In a 22-inning game played at Petco Park between April 17–18, 2008, Taveras established a Rockies' club record with 10 at-bats in the game.

Taveras led MLB with 68 stolen bases during the 2008 season, and led the NL with 24 bunt hits. At the same time, his .296 slugging percentage was the lowest in the majors. Defensively, however, his .976 fielding percentage was the lowest of all qualifying major league center fielders.

On December 12, 2008, the Rockies non-tendered Taveras, making him a free agent.

=== Cincinnati Reds ===
On December 27, 2008, Taveras signed a two-year deal worth $6.25 million with the Cincinnati Reds. In his debut with the Reds, he hit a pinch-hit triple in the 8th inning after being down with the flu for over a week.

In 2009, Taveras had the lowest slugging percentage, .285, and the lowest on-base percentage, .275, of all National League players with at least 350 plate appearances.

On February 1, 2010, Taveras was traded along with Adam Rosales to the Oakland Athletics in exchange for Aaron Miles and a player to be named later. Taveras was designated for assignment later that day alongside Gregorio Petit and Dana Eveland, amid a flurry of roster transactions. Taveras declined a Triple-A assignment and elected free agency on February 9.

=== Washington Nationals ===
On February 15, 2010, Taveras signed a minor league contract with the Washington Nationals that included an invitation to spring training. On April 4, the Nationals selected Taveras' contract, adding him to their active roster. He made 27 appearances for Washington, going 7-for-35 (.200) with four RBI and one stolen base. Taveras was designated for assignment by the Nationals on May 15. He was released by the team after clearing waivers on May 21.

=== Philadelphia Phillies ===
On June 3, 2010, Taveras signed a minor league contract with the Philadelphia Phillies. He was subsequently assigned to the Triple-A Lehigh Valley IronPigs, where he slashed .208/.255/.271 with three RBI and nine stolen bases. Taveras was released by the Phillies organization on June 29.

=== Atlanta Braves ===
On July 3, 2010, Taveras signed a minor league contract with the Atlanta Braves. In 17 appearances for the Triple-A Gwinnett Braves, he batted .119/.213/.143 with one RBI and four stolen bases. Taveras was released by the Braves organization on August 2.

=== Texas Rangers ===
On August 15, 2010, Taveras signed a minor league contract with the Texas Rangers organization. He made 23 appearances for the Triple-A Oklahoma City RedHawks, slashing .275/.323/.396 with two home runs, 10 RBI, and two stolen bases. Taveras elected free agency following the season on November 6.

=== Colorado Rockies (second stint) ===
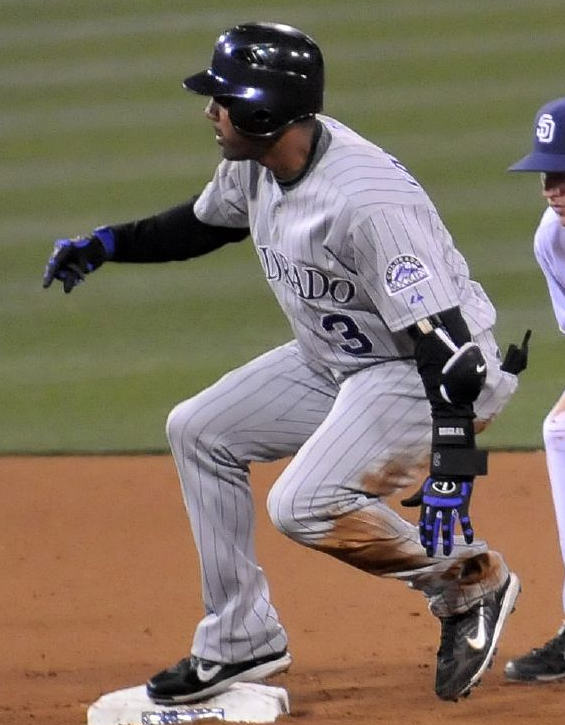
Taveras on April 16, 2008, stealing a base for the Colorado Rockies

On January 24, 2011, Taveras signed a minor league contract with the Colorado Rockies organization. He spent the season with the Rockies' Triple-A affiliate, the Colorado Springs Sky Sox, batting .302/.336/.448 with 10 home runs, 44 RBI, and 13 stolen bases in 97 games. Due to problems with the sports agency that formerly represented him Taveras was out of American baseball for the entire 2012 season.

=== Kansas City Royals ===
On December 11, 2012, Taveras was signed to a minor league contract by the Kansas City Royals that included an invitation to spring training. At the time of the signing Taveras was playing baseball in the Mexican Pacific League with the Yaquis de Obregón. He made 79 appearances for the Triple-A Omaha Storm Chasers, batting .239/.308/.340 with two home runs, 27 RBI, and 11 stolen bases. Taveras was released by the Royals organization on July 25, 2013.

=== Pericos de Puebla ===
On April 2, 2014, Taveras signed with the Pericos de Puebla of the Mexican League. In 103 appearances for Puebla, Taveras slashed .316/.396/.477 with 11 home runs, 57 RBI, and 32 stolen bases.

=== Sugar Land Skeeters ===
Taveras signed with the Sugar Land Skeeters of the Atlantic League of Professional Baseball for the 2015 season. This was Taveras' first year playing in an independent baseball league. In 65 games for the Skeeters, he batted .241/.309/.317 with four home runs, 16 RBI, and 21 stolen bases.

=== Pericos de Puebla (second stint) ===
On February 6, 2015, Taveras signed with the Pericos de Puebla of the Mexican League. In five games for the Pericos, he went 8-for-21 (.381) with three RBI and three stolen bases.

Taveras made 81 appearances for Puebla during the 2016 season, slashing .325/.390/.456 with four home runs, 44 RBI, and 16 stolen bases.

=== Acereros de Monclova ===
On February 21, 2017, Taveras, along with Chad Gaudin, Daric Barton, Nyjer Morgan, Manny Rodriguez, and Rodolfo Amador, were traded to the Acereros de Monclova in exchange for RHP Joaquín Lara. In 103 appearances for Monclova, he batted .304/.369/.455 with 12 home runs, 62 RBI, and 21 stolen bases. Taveras became a free agent following the season.

=== Sugar Land Skeeters (second stint) ===
On May 13, 2019, after spending all of 2018 out of professional baseball, Taveras signed with the Sugar Land Skeeters of the Atlantic League of Professional Baseball. In 27 appearances for Sugar Land, he hit .255/.318/.276 with six RBI and seven stolen bases. Taveras was released by the Skeeters on July 22.

== Scouting report ==
Taveras has good skills for slap-hitting; however, he strikes out frequently (103 times in 2005) and rarely walks. His career-high in walks is 36, resulting in a low on-base percentage. In addition, Taveras is an exceptionally poor power hitter, producing the lowest slugging percentage among all regular major league outfielders for both the 2005 and 2006 seasons. He has great speed and has been clocked at 3.57 seconds from home to first as a right-handed hitter. Taveras has also led the league in infield singles, and his BABIP (batting average on balls in play) was .374 in 2007.

== Career highlights ==
- 2005 Player's Choice Rookie of the Year.
- 2005 Sporting News Rookie of the Year
- Named to 2006 Dominican Republic World Baseball Classic team.
- 30 game hitting streak (Astros franchise record).

== Personal life ==
A cousin of Taveras, Leody, is also an outfielder in Major League Baseball who signed with the Texas Rangers as an international free agent in 2015 and made his MLB debut in 2020.

== See also ==
- Consecutive game hitting streak
- Houston Astros award winners and league leaders
- List of Colorado Rockies team records
- List of Major League Baseball annual stolen base leaders
- List of Major League Baseball career stolen bases leaders
- List of Major League Baseball players from the Dominican Republic

Awards and achievements
Preceded by Jason Bay	Sporting News NL Rookie of the Year; 2005	Succeeded by Hanley Ramírez
Preceded by Jason Bay	Players Choice NL Most Outstanding Rookie; 2005	Succeeded by Dan Uggla
Preceded by Jeff Kent	Houston Astros longest hitting streak 2006—present	Succeeded by Current
