= Jason Jennings =

American baseball player (born 1978)

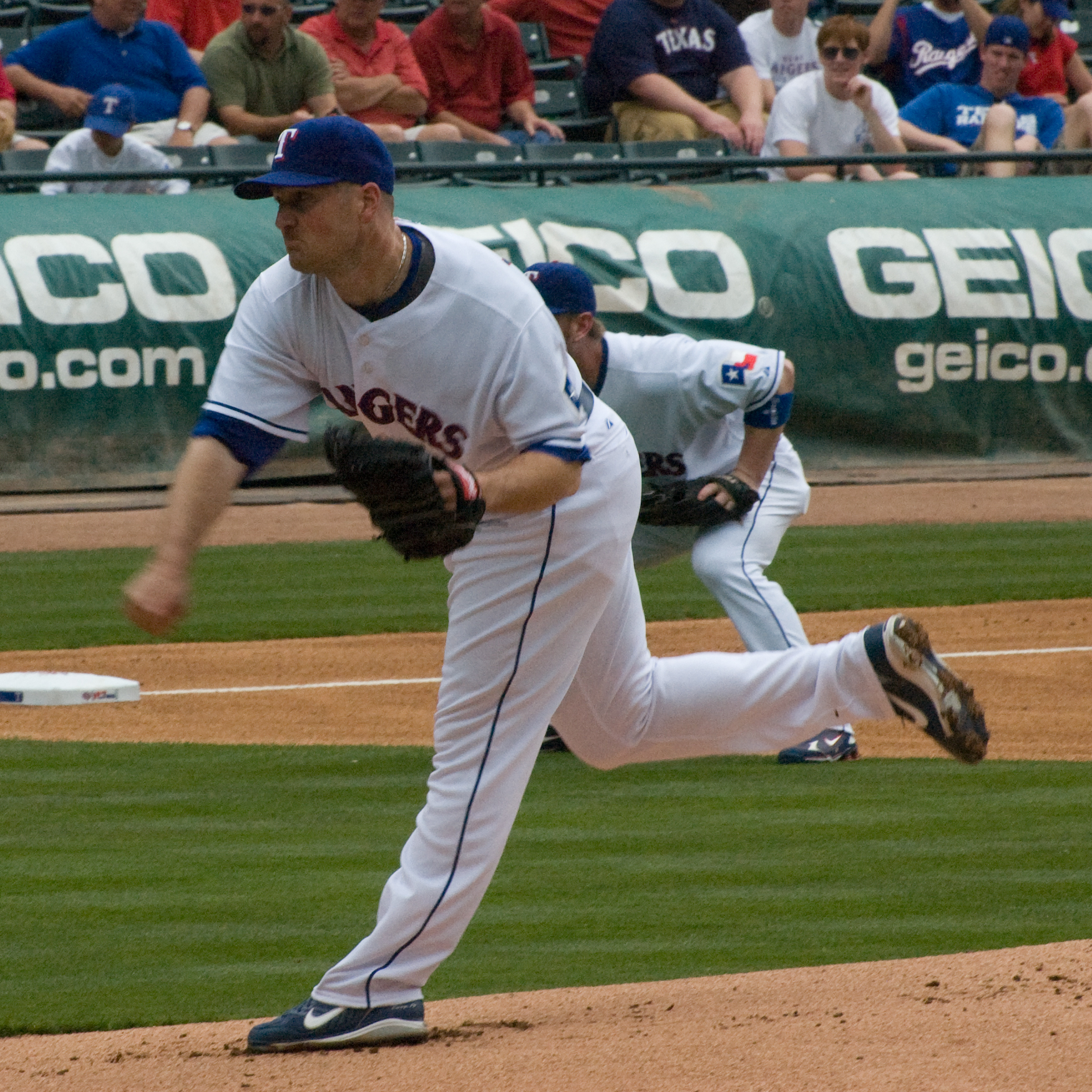
- Jennings with the Texas Rangers
- Pitcher
- Born: July 17, 1978 (age 48); Dallas, Texas, U.S.
- Batted: Left Threw: Right

MLB debut
- August 23, 2001, for the Colorado Rockies

Last MLB appearance
- August 26, 2009, for the Texas Rangers

MLB statistics
- Win–loss record: 62–74
- Earned run average: 4.95
- Strikeouts: 749
- Stats at Baseball Reference

Teams
- Colorado Rockies (2001–2006); Houston Astros (2007); Texas Rangers (2008–2009)

Career highlights and awards
- NL Rookie of the Year (2002); Golden Spikes Award (1999); Dick Howser Trophy (1999)

Jason Ryan Jennings (born July 17, 1978) is an American former professional baseball pitcher. He pitched in Major League Baseball with the Colorado Rockies (2001-2006), Houston Astros (2007) and Texas Rangers (2008-2009). Jennings won the 2002 National League Rookie of the Year Award.

== High school/college years ==
Jennings attended Poteet High School in Mesquite, Texas, and was a standout in both football and baseball. In football, he won All-District honors at both kicker and punter. In baseball, as a senior, he was named the District MVP and posted a .410 batting average, hit seven home runs, and pitched his way to a 10–3 record and a 0.92 ERA with 132 strikeouts.

After graduating from Poteet, he attended Baylor University, where he played baseball from 1997 to 1999. Following his junior season at Baylor, Jennings was named by both Baseball America and Collegiate Baseball as the 1999 National Player of the Year. In what would be his final season at Baylor, he struck out 172 hitters in 146.2 innings and hit .382 with 17 homers and 68 RBIs. He also won the Golden Spikes Award, the Dick Howser Trophy, his second consecutive Big 12 Player of the Year, consensus All-America honors, the Outstanding Player on the 1999 Big 12 All Tournament Team, and a spot on the 1999 All-Big 12 Academic First Team.

== Professional career ==
As a member of the Colorado Rockies, Jason posted impressive numbers in the 2002 season when he won the Major League Baseball Rookie of the Year Award in the National League, beating out Brad Wilkerson and Austin Kearns. In his major league debut, on August 23, 2001, Jennings hit a home run and tossed a complete game shutout, becoming the first major leaguer to accomplish that feat.

On May 8, 2004, Jennings became the only pitcher in history to hit a home run off of Hall of Fame pitcher Greg Maddux.

From 2003 to 2005, Jennings had three losing seasons and posted an ERA above 5 each year. In 2006, Jennings pitched much better, ending the season with a 3.78 ERA, but had only a 9–13 record due to a lack of run support that ranked near the bottom of the league. From May 29 to the end of the season, Jennings had a 3.17 ERA, which was fourth in the Majors and second in the NL behind Roy Oswalt. He also finished with over 200 innings pitched. He ended his career with the Rockies as the franchise's all-time winningest pitcher. He was surpassed in wins by a Rockies pitcher on June 23, 2009, by former teammate Aaron Cook.

On December 12, 2006, the Rockies traded Jennings, along with Miguel Asencio, to the Houston Astros for Willy Taveras, Taylor Buchholz and Jason Hirsh. The deal seemed to work in favor of the 2007 Rockies, who made it to the 2007 World Series with Taveras at the top of the order. Both Buchholz and Hirsh pitched decently in their first season with the Rockies.

2007 was a lackluster year with the Astros for Jennings. In a game against the Padres, he gave up 11 earned runs on eight hits in two-thirds of an inning with three walks and no strikeouts. In doing so, he set the record for the most earned runs allowed by a starting pitcher in a game while pitching less than one inning.

On January 17, 2008, he signed a one-year contract with the Texas Rangers. Jennings ended up going on the DL after just six starts, all in April (missing the rest of the season), in which he struggled mightily. He went 0–5 with an 8.56 ERA, allowing eight home runs in 27 1/3 innings of work, and he made it past the fifth inning only once.

On February 6, 2009, he re-signed with the Rangers to a minor league contract with an invitation to spring training.

On August 27, 2009, Jennings was designated for assignment, then given his outright release by the Rangers.

During the 2009–2010 MLB offseason, Jennings was signed by the Oakland Athletics to a minor-league contract with an invite to spring training.

On May 25, 2011, the Grand Prairie AirHogs of the American Association of Independent Professional Baseball signed Jennings to a contract for the remainder of their season. On September 12, 2011, Jennings started Game 5 of the AA Championship and pitched 6 2/3 innings to pick up the win and help lead the AirHogs to their first American Association Championship — his first championship at any level.

Jennings officially retired in 2012.

== See also ==
- List of Colorado Rockies team records

Preceded by Albert Pujols	Players Choice NL Most Outstanding Rookie; 2002	Succeeded by Scott Podsednik
