= Eric Bruntlett =

American baseball player (born 1978)

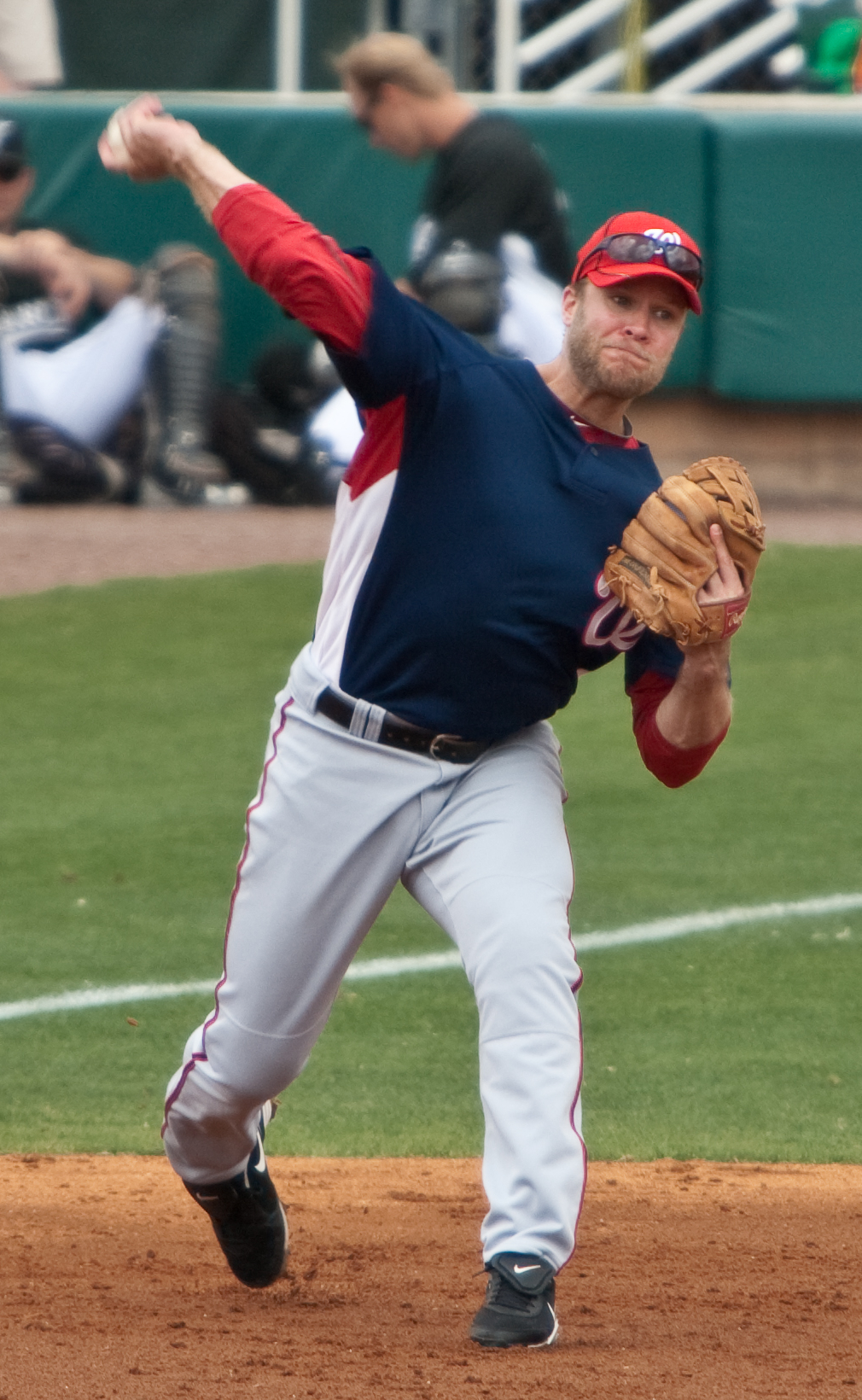
- Bruntlett with the Washington Nationals in 2010
- Utility player
- Born: March 29, 1978 (age 48); Lafayette, Indiana, U.S.
- Batted: Right Threw: Right

MLB debut
- June 27, 2003, for the Houston Astros

Last MLB appearance
- October 4, 2009, for the Philadelphia Phillies

MLB statistics
- Batting average: .231
- Home runs: 11
- Runs batted in: 72
- Stats at Baseball Reference

Teams
- Houston Astros (2003–2007); Philadelphia Phillies (2008–2009)

Career highlights and awards
- World Series champion (2008)

Eric Kevin Bruntlett (born March 29, 1978) is a former American professional baseball player. He was a utility player who played seven seasons from 2003 to 2009 in Major League Baseball (MLB) for the Houston Astros and Philadelphia Phillies.

Born in Lafayette, Indiana, Bruntlett was a shortstop and second baseman for William Henry Harrison High School, where he won a state baseball championship in 1995. He played four seasons of college baseball with the Stanford Cardinal, becoming the team's starting shortstop in 1999. After two College World Series appearances, Bruntlett signed with the Astros, who had selected him in the ninth round of the 2000 MLB draft.

Bruntlett spent three seasons in the Astros farm system behind fellow infield prospect Adam Everett. He made his major league debut in 2003, filling in for an injured José Vizcaíno. A natural middle infielder, Bruntlett spent the next year practicing his outfield defense, allowing him to receive more playing time as a utility bench player. After the 2007 season, the Astros traded Bruntlett to the Phillies, with whom he was a 2008 World Series champion. He left the Phillies after the 2009 season and spent one year in Triple-A before retiring from professional baseball.

== Early life ==
Eric Kevin Bruntlett was born March 29, 1978, in Lafayette, Indiana to Craig and Angela Bruntlett. He was a two-sport athlete at William Henry Harrison High School in Tippecanoe County: in addition to playing second base and shortstop for the Harrison Raiders baseball team, he was a cornerback for their American football team. As a junior in 1995, Bruntlett was on the Raiders team that won the Indiana High School Athletic Association state baseball championship. That season, he batted .463 with 31 runs batted in (RBIs) for Harrison. Outside of his high school baseball team, Bruntlett played on a traveling summer team, where he caught the attention of college recruiters.

== College career ==
The Los Angeles Dodgers of Major League Baseball (MLB) selected Bruntlett in the 72nd round of the 1996 MLB draft, but he did not sign with the team, instead honoring his college baseball commitment to the Stanford Cardinal. He received limited playing time during his first two seasons. As a freshman in 1997, Bruntlett made nine appearances as a bench player, where he batted 5-for-8 with two RBIs. The following season, he missed playing time when sustaining a pulled hamstring during practice, and he only went 0-for-2 in five games. Bruntlett also played collegiate summer baseball with the Cotuit Kettleers of the Cape Cod Baseball League and the Mat-Su Miners of the Alaska Baseball League.

The 1999 season was a breakout year for Bruntlett, who was named the Cardinal's starting shortstop in mid-February. Previously a power hitter, he reworked his batting approach, reducing his strikeout rate and becoming a contact hitter. He finished the season hitting .316 with one home run and 28 RBIs, earning Stanford's Most Improved Player award. Bruntlett also made his first College World Series appearance in 1999. Bruntlett and the Cardinal advanced to the semifinal round of the 1999 NCAA Division I baseball tournament, where they lost 14–11 to the Florida State Seminoles. In his final season of college baseball, Bruntlett started all 62 games for Stanford, batting .352 with 24 doubles and 69 runs scored. Bruntlett and his team reached the 2000 NCAA Division I baseball tournament finals, where they lost 6–5 to the Louisiana State University Tigers.

== Professional career ==
=== Draft and minor leagues (2000–2003) ===
The Houston Astros selected Bruntlett with the 277th overall pick in the ninth round of the 2000 MLB draft, a process which he described as "very different from the last time [he] got drafted". On June 20, shortly after the conclusion of the College World Series, Bruntlett signed with the Astros, who assigned him to the rookie-level Martinsville Astros of the Appalachian League. He struggled with his adjustment to professional baseball, batting only .191 and committing multiple errors that August. In 50 Appalachian League games, Bruntlett finished his first professional season batting .273 with one home run and 21 RBIs.

Bruntlett began the 2001 season with the Double-A Round Rock Express of the Texas League, where he replaced Dave Matranga as the team's starting shortstop. After an offensive slump in May, Bruntlett made a mechanical adjustment to his swing, altering his bat path to improve his vision at the plate. After hitting .266 with three home runs, 40 RBIs, and a team-leading 23 stolen bases in Round Rock, Bruntlett was promoted to the Triple-A New Orleans Zephyrs at the end of August. In five regular-season games with the Zephyrs, Bruntlett went 2-for-16 with one RBI, and he added another five hits and three RBIs in the Pacific Coast League playoffs.

In 2002, having impressed the Astros front office with his performance, Bruntlett returned to the Zephyrs. However, when Adam Everett was sent down to Triple-A at the end of April, Bruntlett was demoted to Round Rock in a roster crunch. In June, Bruntlett stole his 43rd base in Double-A, setting an Express franchise record. The Zephyrs recalled Bruntlett to Triple-A for the final game of the season, after second baseman Keith Ginter was traded to the Milwaukee Brewers as the player to be named later in exchange for Mark Loretta. In 116 games for Round Rock, Bruntlett batted .265 with two home runs and 48 RBIs, while he hit .206 with one RBI in 18 Triple-A games.

Bruntlett opened the 2003 season with the Zephyrs, but his path to becoming a major league player was complicated when the Astros signed veteran infielder Jeff Kent. Bruntlett already faced pressure within the Astros farm system, as he was drafted between infield prospects Everett and Tommy Whiteman. Splitting his time between second base and shortstop, Bruntlett began the year batting .265 with two home runs and 27 RBIs in Triple-A.

=== Houston Astros (2003–2007) ===
When José Vizcaíno fractured his wrist on June 24, 2003, Bruntlett was promoted to the Astros to take his place. Bruntlett made his major league debut on June 27 as a pinch hitter, flying out to center field against the Texas Rangers. After starting his MLB career 0-for-9, Bruntlett recorded his first hit on July 2, with a single against Milwaukee Brewers pitcher Wayne Franklin. His first home run came on July 7, when Bruntlett scored two against Ryan Dempster of the Cincinnati Reds. When Vizcaíno returned from the disabled list on August 21, Bruntlett was optioned back to the Zephyrs. In 26 games with Houston, he played second base, shortstop, and outfield, while batting .255 with one home run and four RBIs. He was promoted to the major league club again on August 31, one day before September call-ups, so that Bruntlett would be eligible for the postseason roster if needed. This move was ultimately unnecessary, as the Astros were eliminated from playoff contention before the end of the regular season. Bruntlett finished his rookie season batting .259 with one home run and four RBIs in 31 games.

During 2004 spring training, Bruntlett's roster position was dependent on whether manager Jimy Williams wanted to carry a pitcher or a position player. Ultimately, he decided that defensive versatility was more valuable than a left-handed relief pitcher, and Bruntlett was named to the Opening Day roster over Mike Gallo. On April 10, however, he was optioned to New Orleans, with his roster spot going to pitcher Chad Harville. After hitting .232 with three home runs and 19 RBIs in New Orleans, Bruntlett returned to the Astros on June 14 while Everett nursed a hamstring strain. During this two-week stint, he went 2-for-10 with one home run and two RBIs, and Williams praised Bruntlett's defensive ability at shortstop, second base, and center field. Bruntlett continued to play the outfield upon his return to the Zephyrs, believing that positional flexibility would afford more opportunities in the majors. When Everett fractured his wrist on August 6 after being hit by a pitch, Bruntlett was called back up to the Astros as a replacement. Because the end of the Zephyrs season coincided with Everett's expected return, Houston carried Bruntlett on the major league roster through the remainder of the year. In 45 regular season games for the Astros, Bruntlett batted .250 with four home runs and eight RBIs. He additionally hit .250 with six home runs and 37 RBIs in 86 Triple-A games. The Astros qualified for the 2004 National League Division Series (NLDS), and Bruntlett was named to the postseason roster as a bench player. The Astros defeated the Atlanta Braves in five games. Bruntlett made two appearances in the series, during which he went 0-for-1 with a walk. The Astros advanced to the 2004 National League Championship Series (NLCS), where they lost to the St. Louis Cardinals in seven games. Bruntlett played in four of those, going 0-for-2 in the process.

New Astros manager Phil Garner decided to carry 11 pitchers and 14 position players into the 2005 season, allowing the team both Bruntlett and Chris Burke as utility players. Bruntlett began the season 0-for-14, the longest hit-less streak in the majors to start the year. The streak ended on May 20, when he doubled against the Texas Rangers. The defining moment of Bruntlett's season came on July 24: as an extra innings defensive replacement, Bruntlett's three-run home run in the 14th inning allowed the Astros to defeat the Washington Nationals 4–1. Playing in 91 regular season games that year, Bruntlett batted .220 with four home runs and 14 RBIs, and he played every position except for pitcher and catcher. Bruntlett was used only sparingly in the postseason: he was 1-for-7 in the 2005 NLDS and 2005 NLCS combined, with five of those seven at-bats coming in an 18-inning NLDS game against the Braves. Defensively, he secured an Astros victory in Game 4 of the NLCS with a game-ending double play against the Cardinals. The Chicago White Sox swept the Astros in the 2005 World Series, with Bruntlett appearing in two games as a defensive replacement.

Vizcaíno's offseason departure from the Astros gave Bruntlett the opportunity for more playing time in 2006, but even as Garner described him as "an exceptional defensive player", he retained his role as a utility player in reserve. In early August, Bruntlett was sent down to the Triple-A Express (Note: Prior to the 2005 season, the Astros underwent a series of minor league realignments. Their Triple-A affiliation with the New Orleans Zephyrs was terminated, and the Express were promoted to Triple-A, with the Corpus Christi Hooks taking over as Houston's Texas League affiliate in Double-A.) – the Astros needed to open a roster spot for Orlando Palmeiro's return from bereavement leave, and because Bruntlett still had minor league options, he could be moved without having to clear waivers. At the time of the demotion, Bruntlett had been hitting .250 with nine RBIs in Houston. He played 22 games in Round Rock, batting .219 with one home run and seven RBIs in the process. He was recalled to Houston on August 28, allowing the Astros defensive flexibility if they made the playoffs. The callback was not needed, as the Astros missed the playoffs with a loss to the Braves on October 1. Bruntlett finished the season hitting .277 with 10 RBIs in 73 games, and he went 7-for-17 in pinch hitting appearances.

In his first year of arbitration eligibility, Bruntlett agreed to a one-year, $525,000 contract with the Astros. The off-season acquisition of veteran utility player Mark Loretta, however, threatened Bruntlett's role on Houston's 2007 roster. He was the last player cut from the opening day roster, a decision which general manager Tim Purpura called the most difficult of the day. No team claimed Bruntlett on waivers, so he began the season in Triple-A with the Express. After hitting .200 in the month of April, Bruntlett had a resurgent May in Round Rock, batting .362 with eight extra-base hits and 15 runs scored. By the time of his promotion on June 14, he was hitting .279 with one home run and 21 RBIs in 60 Triple-A games. The Astros recalled Bruntlett when Everett fractured his leg in a collision with teammate Carlos Lee, and in Everett's absence, Bruntlett split time at shortstop with Loretta. He appeared in 80 MLB games that season, during which he hit .246 with 14 RBIs. The Astros, meanwhile, finished in fourth place in the NL Central, pushing the front office to retool their roster for the upcoming season.

=== Philadelphia Phillies (2008–2009) ===
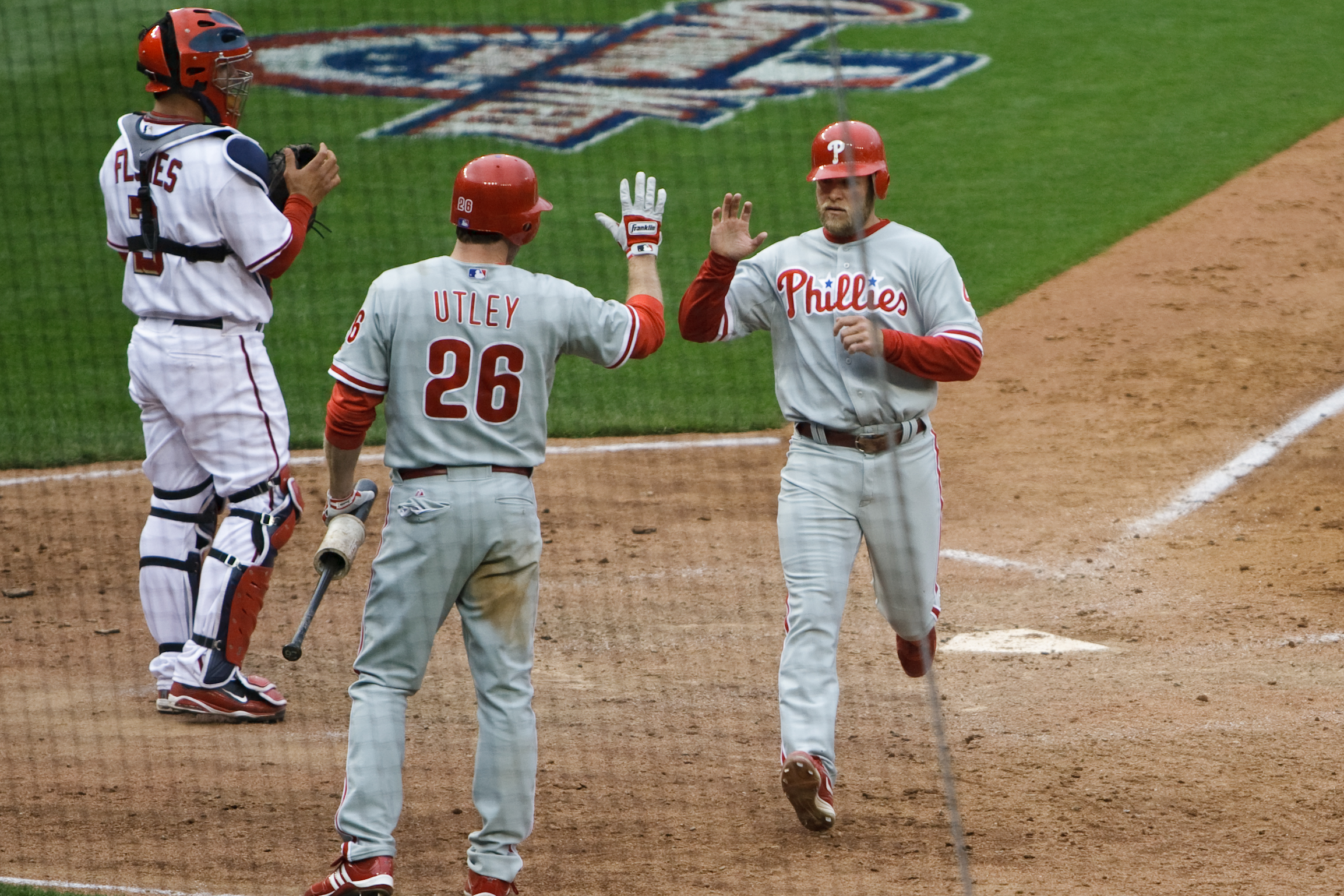
Chase Utley greets Bruntlett at home plate in 2009.

On November 7, 2007, the Astros traded Bruntlett and closer Brad Lidge to the Philadelphia Phillies for center fielder Michael Bourn, relief pitcher Geoff Geary, and infield prospect Mike Costanzo. The Phillies avoided arbitration with Bruntlett, agreeing to a $600,000 contract prior to the 2008 season. Because Philadelphia had an established middle infield of Jimmy Rollins and Chase Utley, there was no clear path for Bruntlett as an everyday player, but manager Charlie Manuel hoped to give him regular playing time in a reserve role. Bruntlett took over as starting shortstop from April 8 to May 10, when Rollins was on the disabled list with a sprained ankle. He had a slow start but ultimately adjusted to the role, hitting .235 with two home runs and 10 RBIs in 26 games during Rollins' absence. For most of the season, Bruntlett's primary role was as a late-inning replacement for Pat Burrell in left field. Appearing in 120 regular season games for the Phillies that year, Bruntlett hit .217 with two home runs and 15 RBIs. Philadelphia defeated the Brewers in the 2008 NLDS and the Los Angeles Dodgers in the 2008 NLCS, with Bruntlett going a combined 1-for-3 across those two series. En route to the Phillies' 2008 World Series championship, Bruntlett delivered two game-winning runs against the Tampa Bay Devil Rays: one as a pinch hitter in Game 3, the other as a pinch runner in Game 5.

After a strong spring training performance, Bruntlett served as the Phillies' right-handed utility player for the 2009 season. On August 23, Bruntlett completed the first game-winning unassisted triple play since Johnny Neun did so with the Detroit Tigers in 1927. After committing two errors in the ninth inning, Bruntlett allowed both Luis Castillo and Daniel Murphy on base with no outs. With Jeff Francoeur up to bat, Castillo and Murphy attempted a double hit and run. Bruntlett caught Francoeur's line drive out of the air, stepped on second base to force out Castillo, and then tagged Murphy out on the base path. The play was a needed victory for Bruntlett, who wanted to contribute to the team even as his offensive struggles subjected him to boos from fans at Citizens Bank Park. Bruntlett finished the regular season hitting .171 with seven RBIs in 72 games. He was left off the 2009 NLDS roster in favor of Miguel Cairo, traveling with the team only as a potential injury replacement. After Manuel was forced to use Cairo as an outfielder and starting pitcher Cliff Lee in the series, however, he added Bruntlett to the Phillies' 2009 NLCS roster at the expense of carrying a 12th pitcher. Bruntlett scored a run in one appearance during the five-game series, and when Manuel returned to 12 pitchers for the 2009 World Series, he elected to keep Bruntlett on the roster over Cairo. Bruntlett was 0-for-1 in one World Series appearance as the Phillies lost the series in six games to the New York Yankees. That November, the Phillies removed Bruntlett from their 40 man roster. Rather than accept an assignment to the Triple-A Lehigh Valley IronPigs, he elected to become a free agent.

=== Later career and retirement (2010) ===
On December 28, 2009, the Washington Nationals signed Bruntlett to a minor-league contract that included an invitation to spring training. Bruntlett did not make the opening day roster and was instead assigned to the Triple-A Syracuse Chiefs as their starting third baseman. After he hit .210 with one home run and 11 RBIs in 44 games for Syracuse, the Nationals organization released Bruntlett on May 31. On June 17, the Triple-A Scranton/Wilkes-Barre Yankees, who were in need of a veteran infielder, signed Bruntlett to a minor-league contract. There, he provided stability to a lineup that was otherwise in frequent flux due to major league call-ups. As Scranton's utility infielder, Bruntlett hit .265 with nine home runs and 38 RBIs in 70 games. Bruntlett did not want to spend another year in Triple-A, and when he did not receive any major league contract offers for the 2011 season, he elected to retire from professional baseball. Between Houston and Philadelphia, Bruntlett finished his career batting .231 with 11 home runs and 72 RBIs in 512 MLB games.

== Personal life ==
Bruntlett met his wife Eden, a delivery room nurse, when they were both students at Stanford. They have two daughters. Bruntlett graduated from Stanford in three years with a degree in economics.
