= Taylor Buchholz =

American baseball player (born 1981)

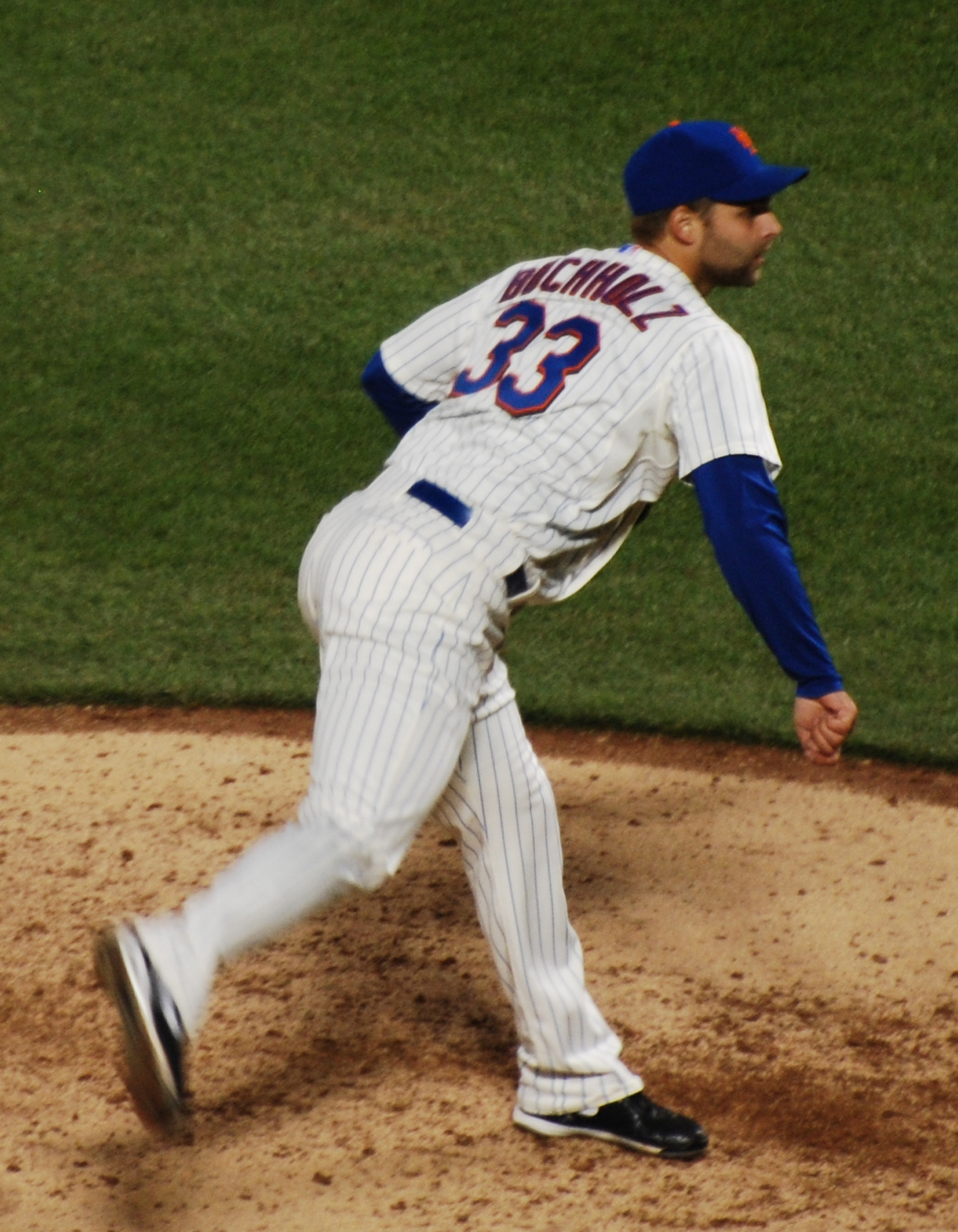
- Buchholz with the New York Mets in 2011
- Pitcher
- Born: October 13, 1981 (age 45); Lower Merion Township, Pennsylvania, U.S.
- Batted: Right Threw: Right

MLB debut
- April 7, 2006, for the Houston Astros

Last MLB appearance
- May 29, 2011, for the New York Mets

MLB statistics
- Win–loss record: 20–22
- Earned run average: 4.28
- Strikeouts: 229
- Stats at Baseball Reference

Teams
- Houston Astros (2006); Colorado Rockies (2007–2008, 2010); Toronto Blue Jays (2010); New York Mets (2011)

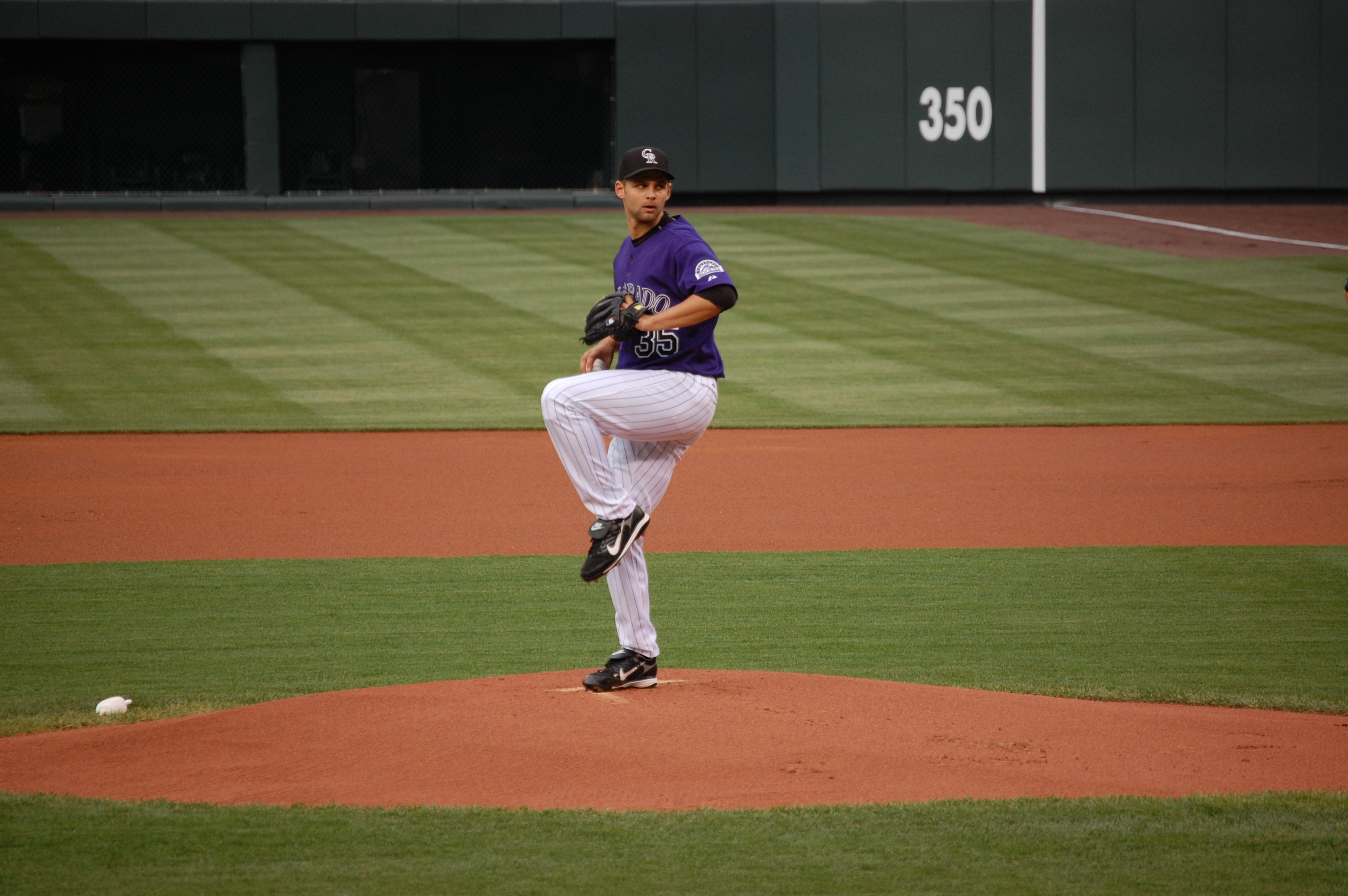
Buchholz pitching for the Colorado Rockies in 2007.

Taylor Buchholz (born October 13, 1981) is an American former professional baseball pitcher. He played in Major League Baseball (MLB) for the Houston Astros, Colorado Rockies, Toronto Blue Jays, and New York Mets.

== Biography ==
Buchholz stands 6 feet 4 inches tall, and weighs 220 lbs. He bats and throws right-handed. He grew up and lives in Springfield, Pennsylvania. He is a distant relative of pitcher Clay Buchholz.

== Baseball career ==
=== Houston Astros ===
Buchholz started out as a minor leaguer for the Philadelphia Phillies. In 2003, he was dealt with Ezequiel Astacio and Brandon Duckworth to the Astros for all-star closer and future Baseball Hall of Fame member Billy Wagner. Originally forgotten by many fans due to Astacio and Duckworth both quickly being brought up to the majors, Buchholz proceeded to impress scouts in the minors, showing promise for the future. After going 6–0 with a 4.81 ERA in 20 games for the Astros Triple A Affiliate Round Rock Express in 2005, Buchholz was called up to the Astros main roster in the 2006 season.

His first success came in his second major league appearance in what was almost a complete-game one-hit shutout against the Pittsburgh Pirates. The first hit came when second baseman Eric Bruntlett double-clutched the ball before throwing, allowing runner Chris Duffy to reach first base safely. After Jack Wilson singled, Astros manager Phil Garner pulled Buchholz and brought in closer Brad Lidge, who struck out Jason Bay to end the game. Buchholz ended up going 8 2/3 innings and giving up only two hits.

On July 29, 2006, Buchholz was demoted to the Triple A Round Rock.

According to SI.com, Buchholz was included as part of a proposed December 7, 2006 trade with the Chicago White Sox to bring Jon Garland to the Astros. The trade, however, fell through when Buchholz failed his physical. Buchholz denied this, telling the Houston Chronicle that he has not had a physical since prior to the 2006 season. These rumors were denied by White Sox general manager Ken Williams.

=== Colorado Rockies ===
On December 12, the Astros traded Willy Taveras, Buchholz, and Jason Hirsh to the Colorado Rockies for Rockies pitchers Jason Jennings and Miguel Asencio. In the 2007 season, Buchholz was utilized by the Rockies as a starter but was later moved into the bullpen. In 2008, Buchholz took up the role as a set-up man for Rockies closer, Brian Fuentes. After missing all of 2009 due to Tommy John surgery, Buchholz made his 2010 debut on July 24, giving up a two-run homer to Raúl Ibañez. On August 17, he was again placed on the DL with lower back stiffness.

=== Toronto Blue Jays ===
On September 9, 2010, Buchholz was claimed off of waivers by the Toronto Blue Jays and placed on the team's 40-man roster. He pitched two scoreless innings for Blue Jays in September before being waived. He was claimed off of waivers by the Boston Red Sox on November 15, then non-tendered on December 2.

=== New York Mets ===
Buchholz signed a one-year contract with the New York Mets on January 3, 2011. His season was plagued by his battle with depression. On November 14, 2011, he was outrighted off the Mets roster.
