= Philip Barzilla =

American baseball player (born 1979)

Phil Barzilla
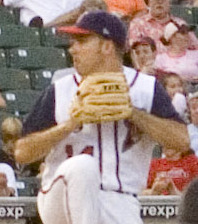
- Barzilla with the Round Rock Express in 2007
- Pitcher
- Born: January 25, 1979 (age 47); Houston, Texas, U.S.
- Batted: Left Threw: Left

Professional debut
- MLB: June 11, 2006, for the Houston Astros
- CPBL: April 17, 2011, for the Brother Elephants

Last appearance
- MLB: June 11, 2006, for the Houston Astros
- CPBL: April 29, 2011, for the Brother Elephants

MLB statistics
- Win–loss record: 0–0
- Earned run average: 0.00
- Strikeouts: 0

CPBL statistics
- Win–loss record: 0–2
- Earned run average: 5.91
- Strikeouts: 6
- Stats at Baseball Reference

Teams
- Houston Astros (2006); Brother Elephants (2011)

Philip Joseph Barzilla (born January 25, 1979) is an American former professional baseball pitcher. He played in Major League Baseball (MLB) for the Houston Astros in 2006, and in the Chinese Professional Baseball League (CPBL) for the Brother Elephants in 2011.

== Amateur career ==
A native of Houston, Texas, Barzilla attended Dulles High School (Sugar Land, Texas), Alvin Community College (Alvin, Texas), and Rice University. In 2000, he played collegiate summer baseball with the Falmouth Commodores of the Cape Cod Baseball League. Barzilla was selected by the Houston Astros in the 4th round of the 2001 MLB draft.

== Professional career ==
=== Houston Astros ===
Barzilla made his only major league appearance on June 11, 2006, for the Astros against the Atlanta Braves, and faced only two batters. Brian Jordan singled off Barzilla before Todd Pratt flew to center field to end the inning. Barzilla's 1/3 of an inning is the second shortest career of an Astros pitcher after Larry Yount's appearance in which he was injured while warming up on the mound and never threw a pitch.

=== Brother Elephants ===
In 2011, Barzilla played for the Brother Elephants of the Chinese Professional Baseball League.
