= Jason Hirsh =

American baseball player (born 1982)

- Pitcher
- Born: February 20, 1982 (age 44); Santa Monica, California, U.S.
- Batted: Right Threw: Right

MLB debut
- August 12, 2006, for the Houston Astros

Last MLB appearance
- September 26, 2008, for the Colorado Rockies

MLB statistics
- Win–loss record: 8–11
- Earned run average: 5.32
- Strikeouts: 110
- Stats at Baseball Reference

Teams
- Houston Astros (2006); Colorado Rockies (2007–2008)

Jason Michael Hirsh (born February 20, 1982) is an American former professional baseball starting pitcher. He played in Major League Baseball (MLB) for the Houston Astros and Colorado Rockies. He stands at 6' 8" and weighs 250 lb (110 kg). He batted and threw right-handed. He threw a two-seam fastball, a four-seam fastball, a slider, and a changeup.

Hirsh was not highly recruited out of high school, but after attending California Lutheran University, he was drafted by the Houston Astros in the second round of the 2003 Major League Baseball draft. From 2005–06, Hirsh won the Double-A Texas League Pitcher of the Year Award and the Triple-A Pacific Coast League Pitcher of the Year Award in successive seasons, as he went a combined 26–10 with 283 strikeouts. In 2006, he was called up to the major leagues for the first time, and he appeared in nine games with the Astros. During the offseason, he was traded to the Colorado Rockies. He was named to the Rockies' starting rotation in 2007 and made a career-high 19 starts before injuries curtailed his season. In 2008, he was limited to four games with the Rockies due to injuries; as it turned out, those would be his last games in the major leagues. He spent the next two seasons in the minors, getting traded to the New York Yankees (whom he never played in the major leagues with) in 2009.

== Early and personal life ==
Hirsh was born in Santa Monica, California. His father is Michael Hirsch.

The Astros drafted and signed Hirsh's younger brother Matt (6 ft 5 in; 235 lbs.), another Cal Lutheran right-handed pitcher, in the 30th round in 2005. Matt went 1–2, 5.61, in 2005 at Rookie-level Greeneville. Released by the Astros on June 12, 2006, Matt signed with the St. Louis Cardinals in September 2006. He never pitched in the Cardinals' organization and finished his career with two independent league teams in 2007.

Hirsh is Jewish, and he keeps track of all the Jewish players in major league baseball. In 2007, the Rockies had a strong Christian influence in their clubhouse; The New York Times said, "Christianity rocks in Colorado's clubhouse." On this, Hirsh said, "There are guys who are religious, sure, but they don’t impress it upon anybody. It’s not like they hung a cross in my locker or anything. They’ve accepted me for who I am, and what I believe in."

He married Pamela Clark in 2007. On November 5, 2009, Hirsh and his wife had a baby boy, Brady Antoine Hirsh.

== High school ==
Hirsh was only 5' 11" as a freshman in high school, and failed to make the basketball team, whereupon he decided to focus on baseball. "Baseball was it for me," said Hirsh. "High school turned out to be one big growth spurt.... All of a sudden I'm 6-foot-8, and people are like, 'What happened to you?'"

Despite his size by the end of high school, Hirsh drew little interest from scouts out of St. Francis High School of La Cañada, California, because he then threw just 86–88 mph.He went undrafted when he graduated in 2000, and no NCAA Division I programs wanted him, so he wound up at Division III California Lutheran University, which was only 40 minutes from his house.

== College ==
Hirsh attended and played baseball at California Lutheran, where he was a 3-year starter, and flashed a 97 mph (156 km/h) fastball and a mid-80s slider. His record was 26–6, he had a 2.96 earned run average (ERA), and he struck out 238 batters in 258.1 innings pitched. As of 2013, he is tied for first at the university in career wins (26) and holds the record for the most strikeouts in a game (18). He was a First-Team All-SCIAC twice, as well as an ABCA All-West Region First-Team selection in 2003.

He was drafted by the Houston Astros with their top pick in the second round (59th overall) of the 2003 amateur entry draft, and signed for a $625,000 signing bonus.

Although Hirsh left college after his junior year, he went back after his first minor league season, e-mailing his assignments in from his laptop when he was in the minors to earn a BA in multimedia in 2004.

== Minor leagues ==
In his pro debut, Hirsh went 3–1 for the 2003 Tri-City ValleyCats, with a 1.95 ERA, limiting batters to a .175 average, and striking out 33 hitters in 32 1/3 innings of work. Following the season, he was rated the No. 8 prospect in the organization by Baseball America. In 2004, he recorded 11 victories with the Single-A advanced Salem Avalanche.

=== 2005: Texas League Pitcher of the Year ===
For a week in January 2005 he worked with Nolan Ryan at Ryan's off-season pitching camp in Houston. Hirsh said: "The biggest thing I got out of it was the confidence ... [having Astros manager] Phil Garner and Nolan Ryan sit there and tell you that you've got the stuff to be in the big leagues."

Playing for the Double-A Corpus Christi Hooks in 2005, Hirsh pitched two perfect innings for the Texas League's West All Star team in the league All Star Game. He was the Texas League Pitcher of the Week three times. For the season, he went 13–8 with a league-best 165 strikeouts while walking only 42, finishing second in the league with 13 wins and second in ERA (2.87) and innings (172.1), and was named 2005 Texas League Pitcher of the Year, team MVP, and Baseball America Double-A All Star. He also earned Texas League post-season All Star honors.

Baseball America named Hirsh Houston's top prospect heading into the 2006 season; it also listed Hirsh as having the "Best Control" in the organization. Before the season, Houston added him to its 40-man roster. "He's a very mature kid," Astros assistant general manager Ricky Bennett said. "He keeps everything in perspective." With Hirsh in spring training with the major league team, manager Phil Garner summed up his estimation of Hirsh as follows:

"He looks to me like he maintains good concentration. Whatever he's doing, he looks like he focuses at it. He looks like he throws the ball down in the zone well, which is really good for as big as he is. And his stuff's good. He looks like he has some of the other ingredients that you've got to have to go along with having good stuff. He's a good athlete. He swings the bat pretty good, and he moves on the mound well."

=== 2006: Pacific Coast League Pitcher of the Year ===
Hirsh began 2006 with the Triple A Round Rock Express, where he mastered a two-seam and four-seam fastball. He suffered a pinched sciatic nerve in his lower back, and therefore did not pick up a weight until June or July, but he got better through running and extra stretching. He was named the starting pitcher for the U.S. Team at the 2006 MLB All-Star Futures Game in Pittsburgh, and was also named a Triple A All Star, and pitched an inning in that game. On July 26, he set a team record of consecutive innings without an earned run at 46 2/3 innings. He had a season record of 13–2 (including a 12-game winning streak; an Express record), led the league in wins, and had a 2.10 ERA (2nd in the league) and 118 strikeouts (4th in the league) in 137.1 innings, as he held batters to a .193 batting average. Hirsh was named the 2006 Pacific Coast League Pitcher of the Year, the MLB.com 2006 Triple-A Starting Pitcher of the Year, a Baseball America Triple-A All Star, and was also elected to the post-season 2006 All-PCL squad as the top right-handed starting pitcher in the league. "Needless to say, he's had an excellent season," Round Rock manager Jackie Moore said. "He's as consistent from one start to the next as any young pitcher I've been associated with."

He was regarded as the top pitching prospect in the Astros' farm system. He was rated by Baseball America as having the best breaking pitch in the PCL, and the league's ninth best prospect.

During the 2006 season, Hirsh also kept an on-line journal on MiLB.com.

=== 2008–13: Rehab and trade to the New York Yankees ===
In 2008, Hirsh tried to work back from his rotator cuff problems and rehab his shoulder after May 30 for the Colorado Springs Sky Sox in the Pacific Coast League. With reduced velocity, he was 4–4 in 18 games (17 starts), with a 5.80 ERA in 99.1 innings. The slow pace of his recovery made for what Hirsh admitted was "a very trying season. I was mentally defeated several times this year." He was still not fully recovered when the Rockies recalled him when rosters expanded in September.

Hirsh was sent to the minors to begin 2009. He went 6–7 with a 6.66 ERA in 20 games, 16 of them starts, for Colorado Springs before being traded to the New York Yankees on July 29 for a player to be named later. He was assigned to the Triple-A Scranton/Wilkes-Barre Yankees of the International League. Yankees manager Joe Girardi said the Yankees got Hirsh to add depth to their rotation. He was 4–0 for the team in 6 starts, with a 1.35 ERA.

Hirsh pitched for Scranton/Wilkes-Barre again in 2010. In early August, he was named International League Pitcher of the Week. He finished 2010 with a 9–7 record in 19 starts and a 3.90 ERA with 95 strikeouts in 122 1/3 innings.

After not pitching in 2011 or 2012, Hirsh made one start for the Amarillo Sox of the independent American Association in 2013, allowing three runs in four innings but earning the win.

== Major leagues ==
=== Houston Astros (2006) ===
Hirsh made his major league debut for the Astros on August 12, 2006, allowing four runs in four innings and taking the loss in a 6–3 defeat to the San Diego Padres. On August 17, he won his first game, allowing three runs in 5 1/3 innings in a 7–3 victory over the Milwaukee Brewers. In celebration, his teammates doused him with beer in the shower after the game. He started 9 games for the season, posting a 3–4 record, a 6.04 ERA, 29 strikeouts, and 22 walks in 44 2/3 innings. He held batters to a .231 batting average with runners in scoring position. On December 12, the Astros traded Hirsh, Willy Taveras, and Taylor Buchholz to the Colorado Rockies for Rockies pitchers Jason Jennings and Miguel Asencio.

=== Colorado Rockies (2007–08) ===
In March 2007, Rockies' manager Clint Hurdle designated Hirsh his No. 4 starter. In Hirsh's first start as a Rockie, on April 6, he allowed one run in 6 2/3 innings, struck out eight, and walked nobody in a 4–3 victory over San Diego. On June 10, he allowed one run and threw the only complete game of his career in a 6–1 victory over the Baltimore Orioles.

During the season, Hirsh would use his secondary pitches to such an extent that he failed to use his fastball, his best pitch, enough of the time. On July 2, he sprained his right ankle in a game against the Mets, diving back to the third base bag when catcher Paul LoDuca attempted to pick him off. He was forced to leave the game despite having pitched six shutout innings, and ended up on the disabled list from July 3 until August 1.

His season was abruptly interrupted, however, when Hirsh went on the disabled list again after his right fibula was broken in a game August 7. Not realizing his leg had been broken on a line drive comebacker hit by the second batter of the game, J. J. Hardy, that caught him in the shin in the first inning, Hirsh went on to throw out Hardy and pitch six innings that day, earning a key win for the club. Asked what he would do the next time he faced Hardy, Hirsh joked: "I might put a catcher's shin guard on, just for him." The injury ended his season. "I was crushed," Hirsh said. "Obviously, nobody wants to have someone tell them that their season's cut short."

In 19 starts in 2007, Hirsh compiled a 5–7 record with a 4.81 earned run average, 75 strikeouts, and 48 walks in 112 1/3 innings; he kept batters to a .204 batting average in their first plate appearance against him in games. Tracy Ringolsby wrote, "Hirsh would have moments, but they were limited. He was 4–7 with a 4.90 ERA in his first 17 starts, and more concerning to the Rockies was he worked five innings or fewer six times." Hirsh missed pitching in the World Series, as he was still on the 60-Day DL.

Hirsh was expected to be in the starting rotation in 2008, as the number 4 starter. But he found himself on the disabled list after just two scoreless innings in one spring training game, and started the season on the DL because of a strained muscle in his right rotator cuff and right rotator cuff inflammation. While on the DL, Hirsh spent a number of weeks in a strengthening program and at extended spring training in Tucson, Arizona, to rebuild his arm strength. "This is the first time I've ever really had injuries," Hirsh said. "I had maybe one injury in the minor leagues coming up. Throughout my career, from when I was a little kid, I've never had arm problems, I've never broken a bone, I've never rolled an ankle. But I've managed to do all three of those in the last two years."

Hirsh was recalled in September and pitched in only four games during the season, including the first relief appearances of his career. His final major league appearance (a start) came on September 26; Hirsh gave up three runs in 4 1/3 innings pitched and received a no-decision in a 6–4 loss to the Arizona Diamondbacks. In four games (only one of which was a start), Hirsh had no record, an 8.31 ERA, six strikeouts, and four walks in 8 2/3 innings.

== Pitching ==
Hirsh had good leverage, pitched down to hitters, and had a refined repertoire of pitches. He had a "plus" 2-seam fastball that had sink and good movement at 91–94 mph, and threw a "filthy" hard-breaking slider that was consistently precise, and had bite at 80–86 mph (managers rated it the best breaking ball in the Texas League). Hirsh continued to refine his moderate changeup, which had fair deception and movement in the low-80s. He also threw a 4-seam fastball in the 94–96 mph range. He was not afraid to pitch inside, and threw strikes to both sides of the plate. "I'm 6-foot-8 and I keep a high three-quarters arm angle," noted Hirsh. "You figure the mound is a foot and a half, and my arm may be another two, three, four feet. It makes the batter have to look up instead of straight at me, and he may have a difficult time adjusting." During the 2007 season, Hirsh had trouble throwing his fastball enough. Pitching coach Bob Apodaca gave this assessment of Hirsh before 2008: "All Jason has to do is trust his stuff. He has the type of fastball you work off, but he was using his fastball the way you'd use an off-speed pitch —- to try and trick hitters."

Injuries began plaguing Hirsh in 2007, and he had trouble recovering from them; he spent all of 2009 and 2010 in the minor leagues.

== Awards ==
- 2005 – 3x Texas League Pitcher of the Week (4/24, 6/26, 7/17)
- 2005 – Texas League All Star (P)
- 2005 – Texas League Post-Season All Star (SP)
- 2005 – Texas League Pitcher of the Year
- 2005 – Baseball America Double-A All Star
- 2006 – Futures Game US Starting Pitcher
- 2006 – Pacific Coast League All Star (P)
- 2006 – Pacific Coast League Post-Season All Star (P)
- 2006 – Pacific Coast League Pitcher of the Year
- 2006 – MLB.com Triple-A Starting Pitcher of the Year
- 2006 – Baseball America Triple-A All Star

== See also ==
- List of Jewish Major League Baseball players
