= José Vizcaíno =

Dominican baseball player (born 1968)

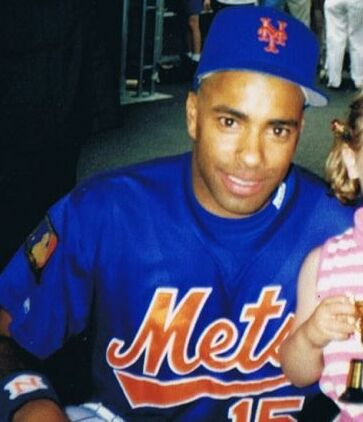
- Vizcaíno with the New York Mets in 1993
- Infielder
- Born: March 26, 1968 (age 57); San Cristobal, Dominican Republic
- Batted: Switch Threw: Right

MLB debut
- September 10, 1989, for the Los Angeles Dodgers

Last MLB appearance
- October 1, 2006, for the St. Louis Cardinals

MLB statistics
- Batting average: .270
- Home runs: 36
- Runs batted in: 480
- Stats at Baseball Reference

Teams
- Los Angeles Dodgers (1989–1990); Chicago Cubs (1991–1993); New York Mets (1994–1996); Cleveland Indians (1996); San Francisco Giants (1997); Los Angeles Dodgers (1998–2000); New York Yankees (2000); Houston Astros (2001–2005); San Francisco Giants (2006); St. Louis Cardinals (2006)

Career highlights and awards
- World Series champion (2000)

José Luis Vizcaíno Pimental (born March 26, 1968) is a Dominican former professional baseball player. He was a backup infielder for most of his Major League Baseball (MLB) career. He, along with Darryl Strawberry and Ricky Ledée, are the only Major League Baseball players to have played for all four former and current New York teams—the New York Yankees, the New York Mets, the Los Angeles Dodgers, and the San Francisco Giants. With the Yankees, he won the 2000 World Series against the Mets.

== Baseball career ==
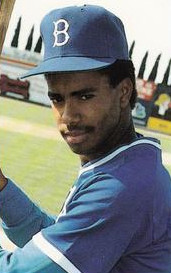
Vizcaíno with the Bakersfield Dodgers in 1988

=== Los Angeles Dodgers (1989–1990) ===
Vizcaíno made his debut with the Dodgers as a late-season call-up in 1989, where he played five games at shortstop for them to conclude the season. In 1990, he was again called up late, playing in 37 games and where he hit a respectable .275. Despite his play, he was traded to the Chicago Cubs on December 14, 1990.

=== Chicago Cubs (1991–1993) ===
In Chicago, Vizcaíno saw his playing time increase, appearing in no less than 86 games in any given season, including a career-high 151 games in 1992. In 1993, he played a significant role, having 551 at-bats and being 9th in the National League with 131 singles as well as second in the NL with 9 sacrifice flies.

=== New York Mets (1994–1996) ===
The Cubs traded Vizcaíno to the New York Mets on March 30, 1994, for Anthony Young and minor-leaguer Ottis Smith. In 1994, Vizcaíno, now a starter for the first time in his career, collected 105 hits before the strike shortened the season. When play resumed in 1995, Vizcaíno responded with his best season to that point, collecting 146 hits, including a career-high 21 doubles and 56 runs batted in, although his strikeouts increased slightly to 76. He finished fifth in the National League in hits that year. In 1996, Vizcaíno played in 96 games for the Mets, hitting .303 (a career-high) with 32 runs batted in. On July 29, 1996, Vizcaíno was traded to the Cleveland Indians along with Jeff Kent for Carlos Baerga and Alvaro Espinoza.

=== Cleveland Indians (1996) ===
In Cleveland, Vizcaíno appeared in 48 games to complete the 1996 season, and made his first career trip to the postseason. In the 1996 American League Division Series against the Baltimore Orioles, Vizcaíno collected four hits (including two doubles) and one run batted in. Despite these contributions, the Indians were defeated by the Orioles. On November 13, 1996, he was traded to the San Francisco Giants along with Matt Williams and a player to be named later (Joe Roa) and Trent Hubbard along with Jeff Kent and Julián Tavárez.

=== San Francisco Giants (1997) ===
With the Giants, he appeared in 151 games hitting .266 with a career-high 50 runs batted in, along with a career-high 87 strikeouts while again returning to the postseason and finished tenth in the National League in hits. In the postseason, Vizcaíno collected two hits and one run while striking out five times as the Giants were defeated by the Florida Marlins. On October 29, 1997, he was granted free agency.

=== Return to the Dodgers (1998–2000) ===
On December 8, 1997, Vizcaíno re-signed with the Los Angeles Dodgers. He appeared in a career-low 67 games in 1998 hitting .262 with 29 runs batted in. In 1999, Vizcaíno played in 94 games collecting 29 runs batted in.

Vizcaíno began the 2000 season with the Dodgers, hitting a dismal .204 over 40 games (collecting only 19 hits). On June 20, he was traded to the New York Yankees with cash for Jim Leyritz.

=== New York Yankees (2000) ===
Vizcaíno appeared in 73 games for the Yankees, hitting .276 with 10 runs batted in, earning a spot on the Yankees postseason roster. In the American League Division Series, he scored one run as a pinch-runner. In the American League Championship Series, he played in four games collecting two hits, three runs, and 2 runs batted in (along with two stolen bases) as the Yankees defeated the Seattle Mariners. Vizcaíno played in four of the five games in the 2000 World Series against the New York Mets. He is most known for his dramatic hit on October 21, 2000, in Game 1. In the bottom of the 12th inning of the then longest game in World Series history, Vizcaíno hit the game-winning RBI single. He earned a World Series ring when the Yankees defeated the Mets in five games. On November 1, he was granted free agency.

=== Houston Astros (2001–2005) ===
Vizcaíno signed with the Astros on November 20, 2000. In 2001, he hit .277 with 71 hits and 14 runs batted in. He appeared in three games in the 2001 National League Division Series, he was 1 for 6 as Houston was defeated by the Atlanta Braves. In 2002, he hit .303 with five home runs and 37 runs batted in 125 games. In 2003, Vizcaíno appeared in only 91 games, where he collected 26 runs batted in. In 2004, Vizcaíno rebounded, hitting .274 and playing in 138 games at shortstop while Adam Everett was out with a broken wrist. In the 2005 National League Division Series, Vizcaíno went 0-for-5 in two games. Despite his lack of productivity, the Astros defeated the Braves in 5 games. In the 2005 National League Championship Series against the St. Louis Cardinals, Vizcaíno did not fare better, again going hitless. In the 2005 World Series, Vizcaíno collected one hit, one walk, and two runs batted in. In Game 2 of the 2005 World Series, he came close to repeating his 2000 World Series walk-off moment when he hit a two-run single with two outs in the ninth inning to tie the game. Following his game tying hit for the Houston Astros, Vizcaíno stayed in the game at shortstop for the bottom of the ninth, and on the way out to his position, he realized he had forgotten his cap and had to return to the dugout to get it. After the game Vizcaíno commented "It was crazy, I ran out there without [a cap], and when I realized it, I felt funny. More camera time for me, I guess." The Astros went on to lose when Scott Podsednik homered in the bottom of the inning and overshadowed Vizcaíno's heroics. In Game 3 of that year's Series, Vizcaíno would play every out of a historic game that went 14 innings, a then-record for longest World Series game ever.

=== Return to the Giants (2006) ===
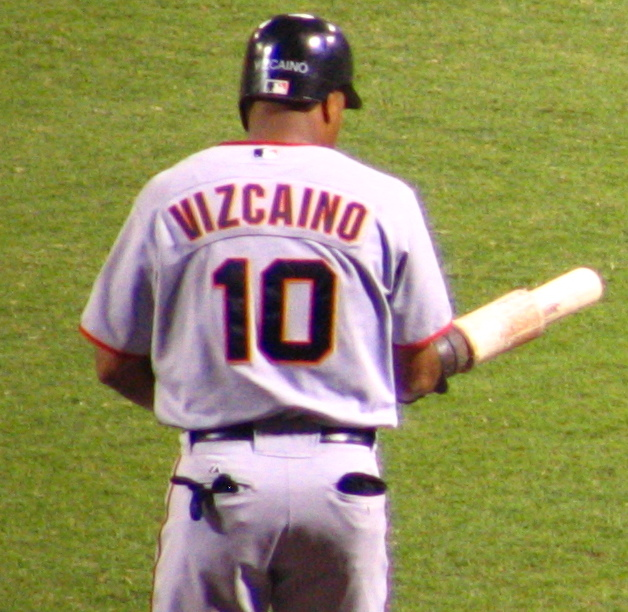
Vizcaíno with the San Francisco Giants in 2006

Vizcaíno was not offered arbitration following the 2005 season from Houston. Instead, he signed a one-year contract with the San Francisco Giants, who designated pitcher Brian Burres for assignment to make room for him on the roster. On August 14, Vizcaíno was designated for assignment by the Giants after hitting just .210 over 64 games.

=== St. Louis Cardinals (2006) ===
On August 23, 2006, Vizcaíno was signed to a contract by the Cardinals and spent the rest of the 2006 season as a replacement for injured shortstop David Eckstein. He played sixteen games but missed the postseason roster.

== Post-playing career ==
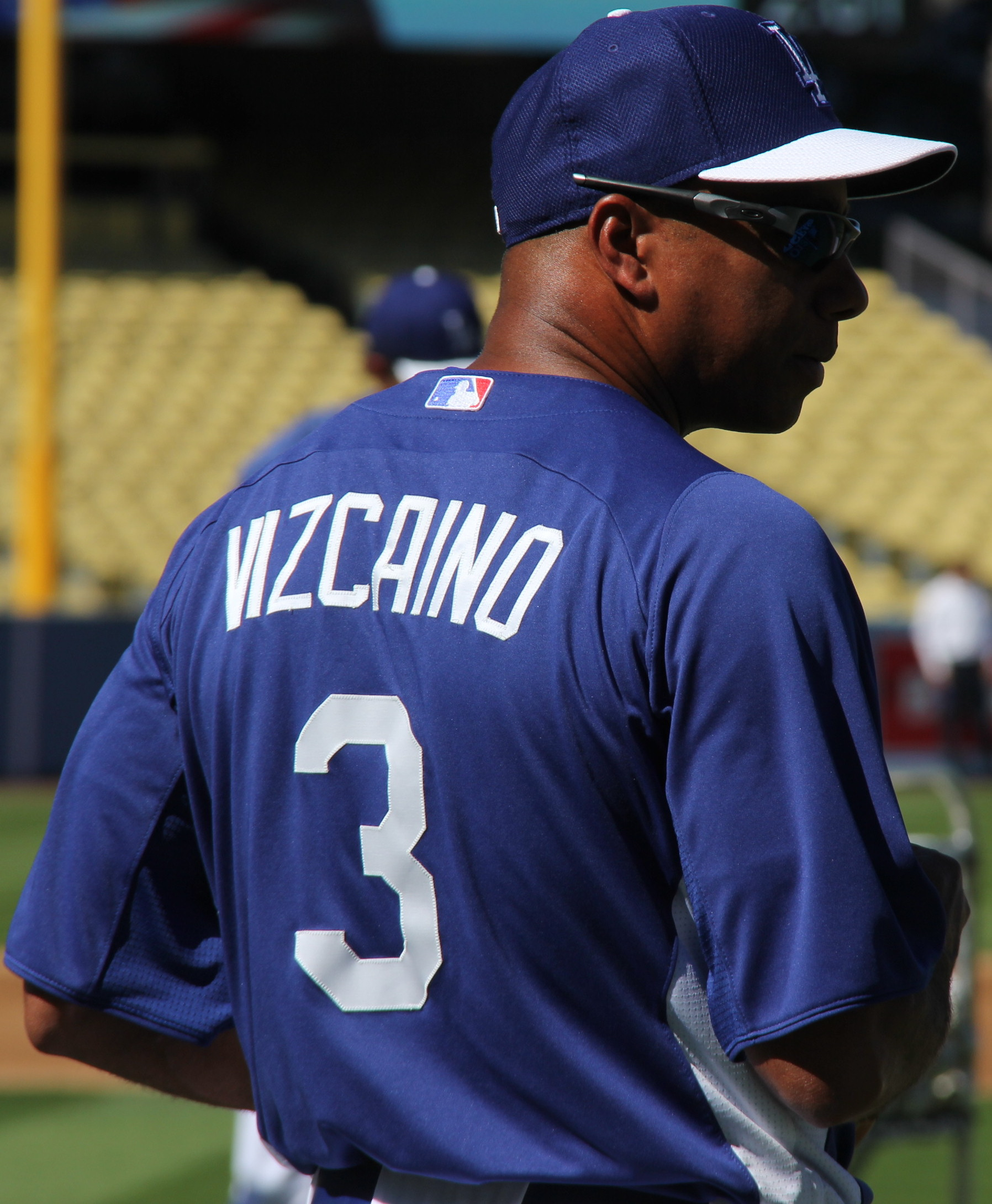
Vizcaíno with the Dodgers in 2013

Vizcaíno was hired as a Special Assistant of Baseball Operations in the Los Angeles Dodgers front office in January 2008.

== Personal life ==
Vizcaíno's son, José Jr., played college baseball for Santa Clara University and was drafted by the San Francisco Giants in the 7th round of the 2015 MLB draft.
