= Adam Everett =

American baseball player (born 1977)

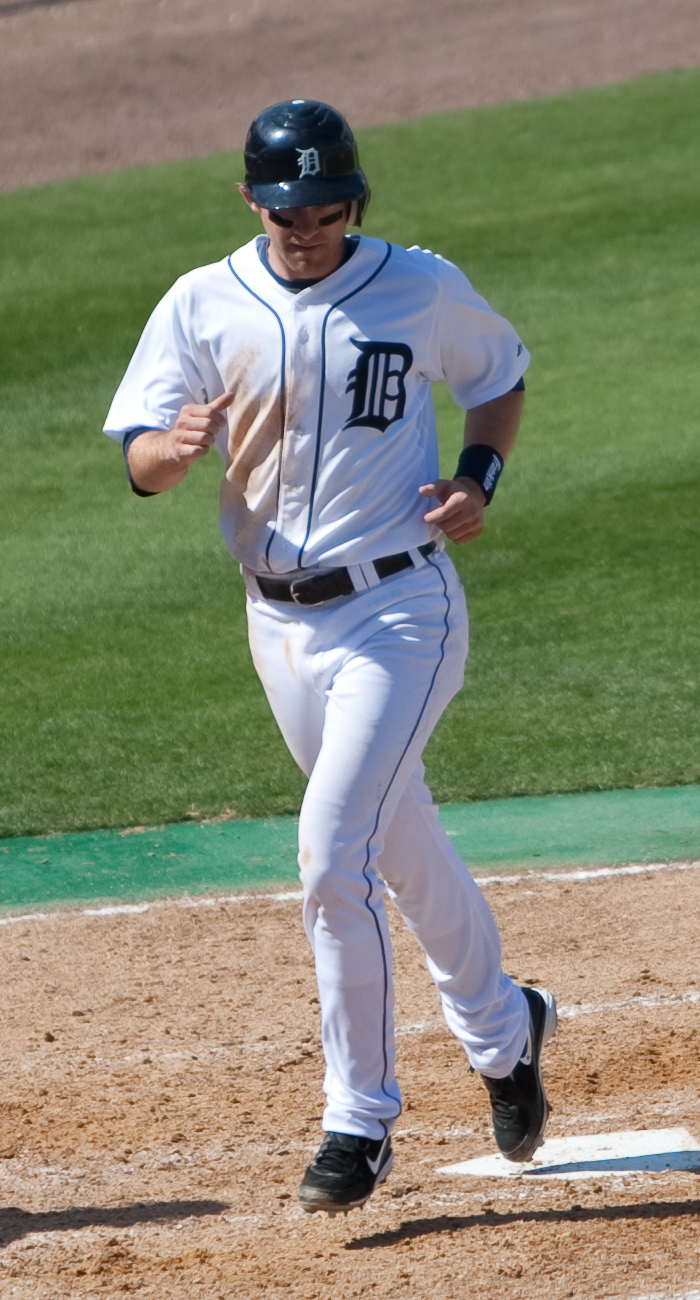
- Everett with the Detroit Tigers
- Shortstop
- Born: February 5, 1977 (age 49); Austell, Georgia, U.S.
- Batted: Right Threw: Right

MLB debut
- August 30, 2001, for the Houston Astros

Last MLB appearance
- June 26, 2011, for the Cleveland Indians

MLB statistics
- Batting average: .242
- Home runs: 40
- Runs batted in: 283
- Stats at Baseball Reference

Teams
- Houston Astros (2001–2007); Minnesota Twins (2008); Detroit Tigers (2009–2010); Cleveland Indians (2011)
Medals
Men's baseball
Representing United States
Olympic Games
Gold medal – first place	2000 Sydney	Team

Jeffery Adam Everett (born February 5, 1977) is an American former professional baseball shortstop and third baseman. He played college baseball for both the NC State Wolfpack and South Carolina Gamecocks. He was drafted in the first round of the 1998 Major League Baseball draft and established himself for his defensive prowess as the starting shortstop for the Houston Astros in 2003. Everett continued his involvement in baseball as a roving infield instructor for the Astros minor league system, and was named bench coach for the Astros on September 1, 2014.

== Professional career ==
=== Minor leagues ===
The Chicago Cubs drafted Everett in the fourth round (91st overall) of the 1995 Major League Baseball draft out of Harrison High School. He did not sign with the team, and he was later selected by the Boston Red Sox in the first round (12th overall) of the 1998 draft.

During the 1998 and 1999 seasons, Everett played for the Single-A Lowell Spinners and Double-A Trenton Thunder before he was traded to the Houston Astros for outfielder Carl Everett on December 14, 1999.

In 2000, he played 126 games for the Triple-A New Orleans Zephyrs, where he batted .245 with five home runs and 37 RBI. Taking a break from minor league baseball, he traveled to Sydney for the 2000 Summer Olympics, where he helped the US team capture the gold medal.

=== Houston Astros ===
Everett made his Major League debut on August 30, 2001 against the Cincinnati Reds, appearing as a defensive replacement at shortstop in the ninth inning. He scored his first run against the San Francisco Giants on September 18 to tie the game at 2–2 in the ninth inning. He appeared in nine games for the Astros that season, going 0-for-3 with one run scored and a stolen base. In 114 games with New Orleans, he batted .249 with five home runs and 40 RBI.

In 2002, Everett appeared in 40 games for the Astros, batting .193 with 4 RBI. With New Orleans, he hit .275 with two home runs and 25 RBI in 88 games. He was called up again in 2003 and played 128 games for the Astros, batting .256 with eight home runs and 51 RBI. On August 6, Everett hit the first ever inside-the-park home run at Minute Maid Park against the New York Mets. On July 9, he hit his first career grand slam against the Cincinnati Reds.

Everett finished second in the 2004 National League (NL) All-Star balloting for shortstops behind the St. Louis Cardinals' Édgar Rentería.

In 2005, Everett hit .248 with a career-high 11 home runs and 54 RBI in 152 games. He helped the Astros reached the World Series, where he went 1-for-15 as the Astros were swept in four games by the Chicago White Sox.

Everett was honored with a Fielding Bible Award as the best fielding MLB shortstop in 2006. According to Baseball-Reference.com, he posted a defensive wins above replacement of 4.1, which was the highest recorded mark in the majors that year. Everett also led the majors in total zone runs with 40, the highest for any position in baseball since 1952. However, Omar Vizquel won the Gold Glove at shortstop for 2006, based on voting from coaches and managers.

On April 9, 2007, Everett became the all-time shortstop home run leader for the Houston Astros, hitting his 34th career home run.

On June 14, 2007, Everett was involved in a collision with left fielder Carlos Lee while chasing down a fly ball, and was diagnosed with a fractured fibula. He missed three months with the injury, and returned to action in September for three games. In 66 games, Everett batted .232 with two home runs and 15 RBI.

=== Minnesota Twins ===
On December 12, 2007, Everett was not offered a contract renewal by the Astros, who had recently traded for shortstop Miguel Tejada. He signed a one-year, $2.8 million contract with the Minnesota Twins the next day. He played in 48 games with the Twins, batting .213 with two home runs and 20 RBI.

=== Detroit Tigers ===
On December 15, 2008, Everett signed a one-year deal with the Detroit Tigers worth $1 million plus incentives. He played in 118 games, batting .238 with three home runs and 44 RBI. On December 7, 2009, Everett signed another one-year deal with Detroit, worth $1.55 million.

On June 6, 2010, the Tigers designated Everett for assignment, replacing him with rookie shortstop Danny Worth. Everett was released by the Tigers on June 15.

=== Cleveland Indians ===
On December 16, 2010, Everett signed a minor league contract with the Cleveland Indians with an invitation to spring training. On March 28, 2011, it was announced that he had earned a place on the Indians' roster as a utility infielder. He was designated for assignment on June 27 and released on June 30.

=== Retirement ===
Everett retired on January 13, 2012, and was hired by the Indians front office to be a special assistant to baseball operations. In 2014, Everett returned to the Astros as a roving infield instructor for the minor league system. On September 1, 2014, Everett was named the bench coach for the major league team.

== See also ==
- Houston Astros award winners and league leaders
- List of Olympic medalists in baseball
