= 2006 Colorado Rockies season =

2006 Colorado Rockies
- League: National League
- Division: West
- Ballpark: Coors Field
- City: Denver, Colorado
- Record: 76–86 (.469)
- Divisional place: 5th
- Owners: Charles & Richard Monfort
- General manager: Dan O'Dowd
- Manager: Clint Hurdle
- Television: KTVD; Fox Sports Rocky Mountain (George Frazier, Drew Goodman, Jeff Huson)
- Radio: KOA (AM) (Jack Corrigan, Jeff Kingery)
- Stats: ESPN.com; Baseball Reference

The Colorado Rockies' 2006 season was the 14th for the Rockies. They competed in the National League West finishing with a record of 76–86 and tied for fourth place in the division. Clint Hurdle was the manager. They played home games at Coors Field.

== Offseason ==
- December 7, 2005: Yorvit Torrealba was traded by the Seattle Mariners to the Colorado Rockies for Marcos Carvajal.
- December 7, 2005: Aaron Miles was traded by the Colorado Rockies with Larry Bigbie to the St. Louis Cardinals for Ray King.
- December 19, 2005: José Mesa was signed as a free agent by the Colorado Rockies.
- January 7, 2006: Eli Marrero was signed as a free agent by the Colorado Rockies.
- February 10, 2006: Josh Fogg was signed as a free agent by the Colorado Rockies.
- February 11, 2006: Jamey Carroll was purchased by the Colorado Rockies from the Washington Nationals.

== Regular season ==
=== Season standings ===
==== National League West ====
NL West
Team	W	L	Pct.	GB	Home	Road
San Diego Padres	88	74	.543	—	43‍–‍38	45‍–‍36
Los Angeles Dodgers	88	74	.543	—	49‍–‍32	39‍–‍42
San Francisco Giants	76	85	.472	11½	43‍–‍38	33‍–‍47
Arizona Diamondbacks	76	86	.469	12	39‍–‍42	37‍–‍44
Colorado Rockies	76	86	.469	12	44‍–‍37	32‍–‍49

==== Record vs. opponents ====
2006 National League record Source: MLB Standings Grid – 2006
Team	AZ	ATL	CHC	CIN	COL	FLA	HOU	LAD	MIL	NYM	PHI	PIT	SD	SF	STL	WAS	AL
Arizona	—	6–1	4–2	4–2	12–7	2–4	4–5	8–10	3–3	1–6	1–5	5–1	9–10	8–11	4–3	1–5	4–11
Atlanta	1–6	—	6–1	4–3	3–3	11–8	3–4	3–3	2–4	7–11	7–11	3–3	7–2	3–4	4–2	10–8	5–10
Chicago	2–4	1–6	—	10–9	2–4	2–4	7–8	4–2	8–8	3–3	2–5	6–9	0–7	2–4	11–8	2–4	4–11
Cincinnati	2–4	3–4	9–10	—	5–1	4–2	10–5	0–6	9–10	3–4	2–4	9–7	2–4	2–5	9–6	5–1	6-9
Colorado	7–12	3–3	4–2	1–5	—	3–3	4–2	4–15	2–4	1–5	3–4	3–3	10–9	10–8	2–7	8–0	11–4
Florida	4–2	8–11	4–2	2–4	3–3	—	3–4	1–5	7–0	8–11	6–13	5–2	3–3	3–3	1–5	11–7	9–9
Houston	5–4	4–3	8–7	5–10	2–4	4-3	—	3–3	10–5	2–4	2–4	13–3	3–3	1–5	9–7	4–4	7–11
Los Angeles	10–8	3–3	2–4	6–0	15–4	5–1	3–3	—	4–2	3–4	4–3	6–4	5–13	13–6	0–7	4–2	5–10
Milwaukee	3–3	4–2	8–8	10–9	4–2	0–7	5–10	2–4	—	3–3	5–1	7–9	4–3	6–3	7–9	1–5	6–9
New York	6–1	11–7	3–3	4–3	5–1	11–8	4–2	4–3	3–3	—	11–8	5–4	5–2	3–3	4–2	12–6	6–9
Philadelphia	5-1	11–7	5–2	4–2	4–3	13–6	4–2	3–4	1–5	8–11	—	3–3	2–4	5–1	3–3	9–10	5–13
Pittsburgh	1–5	3–3	9–6	7–9	3–3	2–5	3–13	4–6	9–7	4–5	3–3	—	1–5	6–1	6–9	3–3	3–12
San Diego	10–9	2–7	7–0	4–2	9–10	3–3	3–3	13–5	3–4	2–5	4–2	5–1	—	7–12	4–2	5–1	7–8
San Francisco	11–8	4–3	4–2	5–2	8–10	3–3	5–1	6–13	3–6	3–3	1–5	1–6	12–7	—	1–4	1–5	8–7
St. Louis	3–4	2–4	8–11	6–9	7–2	5-1	7–9	7–0	9–7	2–4	3–3	9–6	2–4	4–1	—	4–3	5–10
Washington	5–1	8–10	4–2	1–5	0–8	7-11	4–4	2–4	5–1	6–12	10–9	3–3	1–5	5–1	3–4	—	7–11

=== Transactions ===
- June 9, 2006: Eli Marrero was traded by the Colorado Rockies to the New York Mets for Kazuo Matsui and cash.
- July 31, 2006: Scott Dohmann and Ryan Shealy were traded by the Colorado Rockies to the Kansas City Royals for Jeremy Affeldt and Denny Bautista.
- August 14, 2006: Vinny Castilla was signed as a free agent by the Colorado Rockies.

=== Major League debuts ===
- Batters:
  - Chris Iannetta (Aug 27)
  - Troy Tulowitzki (Aug 30)
  - Jeff Salazar (Sep 7)
  - Alvin Colina (Sep 18)
- Pitchers:
  - Ramón Ramírez (Apr 14)
  - Manuel Corpas (Jul 18)
  - Justin Hampson (Sep 10)
  - Juan Morillo (Sep 24)
  - Ubaldo Jiménez (Sep 26)

=== Roster ===
2006 Colorado Rockies
Roster
Pitchers: 41 Jeremy Affeldt; 46 Miguel Asencio; 54 Denny Bautista; 28 Aaron Cook; 60 Manny Corpas; 45 Zach Day; 18 Mike DeJean; 47 Scott Dohmann; 35 Nate Field; 37 Josh Fogg; 26 Jeff Francis; 40 Brian Fuentes; 47 Justin Hampson; 32 Jason Jennings; 38 Ubaldo Jiménez; 49 Byung-hyun Kim; 51 Sun-Woo Kim; 56 Ray King; 39 Tom Martin; 49 José Mesa; 51 Juan Morillo; 61 Ramón Ramírez; 45 Mike Venafro	Catchers: 55 Danny Ardoin; 7 J. D. Closser; 55 Alvin Colina; 20 Chris Iannetta; 20 Miguel Ojeda; 8 Yorvit Torrealba; Infielders: 27 Garrett Atkins; 12 Clint Barmes; 1 Jamey Carroll; 9 Vinny Castilla; 4 Luis González; 17 Todd Helton; 16 Eli Marrero; 16 Kaz Matsui; 6 Omar Quintanilla; 43 Ryan Shealy; 24 Jason Smith; 14 Troy Tulowitzki	Outfielders: 10 Jeff Baker; 21 Choo Freeman; 11 Brad Hawpe; 5 Matt Holliday; 3 Jorge Piedra; 15 Jeff Salazar; 19 Ryan Spilborghs; 31 Cory Sullivan	Manager: 13 Clint Hurdle; Coaches: 36 Bob Apodaca (pitching); 29 Dave Collins (first base); 52 Duane Espy (hitting); 2 Mike Gallego (third base); 53 Rick Mathews (bullpen); 9 Jamie Quirk (bench); 59 Mark Strittmatter (bullpen catcher)

=== Game log ===
2006 game log
April (15–10)

#	Date	Opponent	Score	Win	Loss	Save	Attendance	Record
1	April 3	Diamondbacks	3–2 (11)	DeJean (1–0)	Grimsley (0–1)		47,278	1–0
2	April 5	Diamondbacks	4–2	Hernández (1–0)	Cook (0–1)	Valverde (1)	18,553	1–1
3	April 6	Diamondbacks	12–5	Batista (1–0)	Francis (0–1)		18,406	1–2
4	April 7	@ Padres	10–4	Fogg (1–0)	Hensley (0–1)		33,918	2–2
5	April 8	@ Padres	12–4	Day (1–0)	Brazelton (0–1)		29,629	3–2
6	April 9	@ Padres	10–4	Jennings (1–0)	Peavy (1–1)		28,901	4–2
7	April 11	@ Diamondbacks	6–5	Cook (1–1)	Hernández (1–1)	Fuentes (1)	37,355	5–2
8	April 12	@ Diamondbacks	5–4	Aquino (1–0)	King (0–1)	Valverde (2)	18,664	5–3
9	April 13	@ Diamondbacks	5–3	Fogg (2–0)	Ortiz (0–2)	Fuentes (2)	18,745	6–3
10	April 14	Phillies	10–8	Madson (1–0)	Day (1–1)	Gordon (3)	25,390	6–4
11	April 15	Phillies	10–6	King (1–1)	Lieber (0–3)		23,206	7–4
12	April 16	Phillies	1–0	Myers (1–0)	Cook (1–2)	Gordon (4)	25,144	7–5
13	April 17	Padres	5–2	Young (2–0)	Francis (0–2)	Hoffman (2)	18,591	7–6
14	April 18	Padres	3–2 (11)	Cortés (1–0)	Adkins (0–1)		18,595	8–6
15	April 19	Padres	13–4	Park (1–0)	Day (1–2)		18,827	8–7
16	April 21	Giants	9–8	Cortés (2–0)	Worrell (2–1)		30,339	9–7
17	April 22	Giants	6–4	Hennessey (2–0)	Cook (1–3)	Benítez (1)	36,035	9–8
18	April 23	Giants	3–2 (10)	Cortés (3–0)	Fassero (1–1)		30,310	10–8
19	April 24	@ Phillies	6–5	Lidle (2–2)	Fogg (2–1)	Gordon (6)	20,244	10–9
20	April 25	@ Phillies	7–6	Ramírez (1–0)	Floyd (1–2)	Fuentes (3)	19,512	11–9
21	April 26	@ Phillies	9–5	Madson (2–1)	Jennings (1–1)		19,182	11–10
22	April 27	@ Phillies	6–3	Cook (2–3)	Franklin (1–2)	Fuentes (4)	21,506	12–10
23	April 28	@ Marlins	3–2 (10)	Fuentes (1–0)	Herges (0–2)	Dohmann (1)	10,419	13–10
24	April 29	@ Marlins	8–7	Asencio (1–0)	Messenger (0–1)	Fuentes (5)	15,405	14–10
25	April 30	@ Marlins	3–1	Kim (1–0)	Mitre (1–3)	Mesa (1)	13,259	15–10

May (12–16)

#	Date	Opponent	Score	Win	Loss	Save	Attendance	Record
26	May 1	@ Braves	2–0	Hudson (2–2)	Jennings (1–2)		19,212	15–11
27	May 2	@ Braves	5–4	Cormier (2–1)	King (1–2)	Reitsma (6)	22,813	15–12
28	May 3	Reds	3–0	Francis (1–2)	Claussen (2–3)	Fuentes (6)	18,214	16–12
29	May 4	Reds	7–1	Harang (5–1)	Fogg (2–2)		18,204	16–13
30	May 5	Astros	6–4	Ramírez (2–0)	Lidge (0–2)		20,327	17–13
31	May 6	Astros	5–0	Jennings (2–2)	Rodríguez (4–1)		26,358	18–13
32	May 7	Astros	5–3	Cook (3–3)	Nieve (1–1)	Fuentes (7)	30,270	19–13
33	May 8	@ Cardinals	6–2	Francis (2–2)	Marquis (3–4)	Fuentes (8)	39,007	20–13
34	May 9	@ Cardinals	4–2	Wainwright (1–0)	Mesa (0–1)	Isringhausen (9)	40,375	20–14
35	May 10	@ Cardinals	7–4	Suppan (4–2)	Kim (1–1)	Isringhausen (10)	39,108	20–15
36	May 12	@ Astros	12–2	Gallo (1–0)	Jennings (2–3)		39,617	20–16
37	May 13	@ Astros	2–1	Cook (4–3)	Oswalt (5–3)	Fuentes (9)	35,852	21–16
38	May 14	@ Astros	3–0	Pettitte (3–4)	Francis (2–3)		37,614	21–17
39	May 15	Dodgers	5–4	Tomko (5–1)	Ramírez (2–1)	Saito (1)	20,208	21–18
40	May 16	Dodgers	5–1	Kim (2–1)	Lowe (1–3)		23,192	22–18
41	May 17	Dodgers	3–2	Penny (4–1)	Jennings (2–4)	Báez (9)	30,296	22–19
42	May 19	Blue Jays	8–3	Cook (5–3)	Towers (1–8)		26,011	23–19
43	May 20	Blue Jays	5–1	Francis (3–3)	Taubenheim (0–1)		26,212	24–19
44	May 21	Blue Jays	5–3	Fogg (3–2)	Lilly (4–4)	Fuentes (10)	30,291	25–19
45	May 22	@ Dodgers	6–1	Seo (2–2)	Kim (2–2)		33,652	25–20
46	May 23	@ Dodgers	8–1	Penny (5–1)	Jennings (2–5)		40,228	25–21
47	May 24	@ Dodgers	7–1	Sele (3–0)	Cook (5–4)		39,299	25–22
48	May 26	@ Giants	9–0	Schmidt (4–2)	Francis (3–4)		40,923	25–23
49	May 27	@ Giants	4–1	Cain (3–5)	Fogg (3–3)	Benítez (3)	40,350	25–24
50	May 28	@ Giants	6–3	Kim (3–2)	Wright (5–4)	Fuentes (11)	42,935	26–24
51	May 29	@ Padres	5–0	Jennings (3–5)	Thompson (2–1)		27,904	27–24
52	May 30	@ Padres	2–0	Young (4–3)	Cook (5–5)	Hoffman (10)	23,698	27–25
53	May 31	@ Padres	3–2	Hensley (4–3)	Francis (3–5)	Hoffman (11)	24,607	27–26

June (14–12)

#	Date	Opponent	Score	Win	Loss	Save	Attendance	Record
54	June 2	Marlins	4–2	Willis (2–6)	Fogg (3–4)	Kensing (1)	26,112	27–27
55	June 3	Marlins	13–0	Nolasco (4–2)	Kim (3–3)		23,831	27–28
56	June 4	Marlins	4–3	Olsen (4–3)	Jennings (3–6)	Borowski (7)	21,125	27–29
57	June 5	Pirates	5–2	Snell (6–3)	Cook (5–6)	Gonzalez (8)	20,152	27–30
58	June 6	Pirates	5–4	Francis (4–5)	Maholm (2–5)	Fuentes (12)	20,277	28–30
59	June 7	Pirates	16–9	Dohmann (1–0)	Pérez (2–7)		21,509	29–30
60	June 9	Dodgers	3–0	Penny (7–1)	Kim (3–4)	Saito (3)	30,455	29–31
61	June 10	Dodgers	12–9	Jennings (4–6)	Tomko (5–5)	Fuentes (13)	35,557	30–31
62	June 11	Dodgers	6–5	Báez (4–3)	Fuentes (1–1)	Saito (4)	29,221	30–32
63	June 12	@ Nationals	4–3	Francis (5–5)	Ortiz (5–5)	Fuentes (14)	20,633	31–32
64	June 13	@ Nationals	9–2	Fogg (4–4)	O'Connor (3–4)		21,689	32–32
65	June 14	@ Nationals	14–8	Martin (1–0)	Bray (1–1)		24,273	33–32
66	June 15	@ Nationals	8–1	Jennings (5–6)	Hernández (5–7)		22,793	34–32
67	June 16	@ Cardinals	8–1	Marquis (9–4)	Cook (5–7)		45,736	34–33
68	June 17	@ Cardinals	6–5	Suppan (6–4)	Francis (5–6)	Isringhausen (23)	45,968	34–34
69	June 18	@ Cardinals	4–1	Carpenter (6–3)	Fogg (4–5)	Isringhausen (24)	45,647	34–35
70	June 19	Athletics	7–0	Kim (4–4)	Haren (6–6)		21,964	35–35
71	June 20	Athletics	6–0	Jennings (6–6)	Loaiza (2–4)		21,753	36–35
72	June 21	Athletics	3–2 (11)	Calero (1–1)	King (1–3)		26,489	36–36
73	June 23	Rangers	8–6	Koronka (6–4)	Francis (5–7)	Otsuka (15)	28,360	36–37
74	June 24	Rangers	11–6	Fogg (5–5)	Tejeda (1–3)		31,439	37–37
75	June 25	Rangers	3–0	Kim (5–4)	Padilla (6–5)	Fuentes (15)	28,313	38–37
76	June 26	@ Angels	5–4	Lackey (5–5)	Mesa (0–2)	Rodríguez (19)	43,781	38–38
77	June 27	@ Angels	12–4	Cook (6–7)	Weaver (3–10)		39,341	39–38
78	June 28	@ Angels	6–2	Ramírez (3–1)	Shields (4–5)		38,153	40–38
79	June 30	@ Mariners	2–0	Fogg (6–5)	Moyer (5–7)		31,612	41–38

July (10–16)

#	Date	Opponent	Score	Win	Loss	Save	Attendance	Record
80	July 1	@ Mariners	8–7	Mateo (5–1)	Cortés (3–1)	Putz (15)	33,638	41–39
81	July 2	@ Mariners	4–3 (11)	Fuentes (2–1)	Mateo (5–2)	King (1)	31,709	42–39
82	July 3	Giants	9–6	Accardo (1–2)	Ramírez (3–2)	Benítez (8)	48,364	42–40
83	July 4	Giants	6–1	Francis (6–7)	Schmidt (6–4)		48,078	43–40
84	July 5	Giants	5–3	Fogg (7–5)	Wright (5–8)	Fuentes (16)	23,485	44–40
85	July 7	Diamondbacks	4–3	Medders (2–2)	Kim (5–5)	Julio (8)	26,313	44–41
86	July 8	Diamondbacks	8–7	Vizcaíno (3–3)	Fuentes (2–2)	Julio (9)	22,874	44–42
87	July 9	Diamondbacks	8–5	González (1–2)	Dohmann (1–1)	Julio (10)	22,210	44–43
88	July 13	@ Reds	9–7	Milton (6–4)	Francis (6–8)	Guardado (6)	20,660	44–44
89	July 14	@ Reds	3–1	Harang (10–6)	Jennings (6–7)	Guardado (7)	22,497	44–45
90	July 15	@ Reds	3–2	Bray (2–1)	Fuentes (2–3)		35,396	44–46
91	July 16	@ Reds	6–4	Coffey (4–4)	Mesa (0–3)	Guardado (8)	27,043	44–47
92	July 17	@ Pirates	3–1	Grabow (2–1)	Kim (5–6)	Capps (1)	18,835	44–48
93	July 18	@ Pirates	13–4	Francis (7–8)	Gorzelanny (0–2)		20,086	45–48
94	July 19	@ Pirates	6–5	Duke (7–8)	Jennings (6–8)	Gonzalez (15)	19,881	45–49
95	July 21	@ Diamondbacks	6–2	Vargas (8–6)	Cook (6–8)		23,068	45–50
96	July 22	@ Diamondbacks	4–3	Medders (4–2)	Mesa (0–4)	Julio (12)	28,745	45–51
97	July 23	@ Diamondbacks	9–7	Martin (2–0)	Julio (1–4)	Fuentes (17)	29,310	46–51
98	July 24	Cardinals	7–0	Francis (8–8)	Reyes (2–4)		28,830	47–51
99	July 25	Cardinals	1–0	Carpenter (10–4)	Jennings (6–9)	Isringhausen (28)	31,673	47–52
100	July 26	Cardinals	6–1	Suppan (8–5)	Cook (6–9)		32,872	47–53
101	July 27	Padres	9–8 (10)	Fuentes (3–3)	Williamson (2–4)		24,260	48–53
102	July 28	Padres	3–1	Kim (6–6)	Hensley (6–8)	Fuentes (18)	28,790	49–53
103	July 29	Padres	4–2	Young (9–4)	Francis (8–9)	Hoffman (28)	43,433	49–54
104	July 30	Padres	3–1	Jennings (7–9)	Thompson (3–3)	Fuentes (19)	25,790	50–54
105	July 31	Brewers	4–2	Cook (7–9)	Capuano (10–7)	Fuentes (20)	23,189	51–54

August (11–17)

#	Date	Opponent	Score	Win	Loss	Save	Attendance	Record
106	August 1	Brewers	1–0	Bush (7–8)	Fogg (7–6)	Cordero (8)	22,082	51–55
107	August 2	Brewers	8–2	Kim (7–6)	Ohka (3–2)		24,034	52–55
108	August 4	@ Giants	5–2	Francis (9–9)	Morris (8–9)	Fuentes (21)	38,033	53–55
109	August 5	@ Giants	2–1 (11)	Affeldt (5–6)	Hennessey (4–2)	Fuentes (22)	39,014	54–55
110	August 6	@ Giants	6–2	Cain (8–8)	Cook (7–10)		39,288	54–56
111	August 7	@ Dodgers	7–2	Penny (12–5)	Fogg (7–7)		44,593	54–57
112	August 8	@ Dodgers	4–2	Tomko (7–6)	Kim (7–7)	Saito (12)	50,210	54–58
113	August 9	@ Dodgers	3–1	Affeldt (6–6)	Lowe (9–8)	Fuentes (23)	46,643	55–58
114	August 10	@ Dodgers	4–3	Saito (4–2)	Mesa (0–5)		48,699	55–59
115	August 11	Cubs	10–2	Cook (8–10)	Hill (2–5)		35,744	56–59
116	August 12	Cubs	8–4	Fogg (8–7)	Guzmán (0–3)		43,485	57–59
117	August 13	Cubs	8–7	Novoa (2–0)	Corpas (0–1)	Dempster (23)	35,408	57–60
118	August 14	Diamondbacks	4–3	Affeldt (7–6)	Peña (3–2)		21,365	58–60
119	August 15	Diamondbacks	2–1 (18)	Medders (5–2)	Ramírez (3–3)		22,076	58–61
120	August 16	Diamondbacks	9–5	Hernández (10–9)	Cook (8–11)		23,415	58–62
121	August 17	Diamondbacks	8–4	Fogg (9–7)	Webb (13–5)		23,390	59–62
122	August 18	@ Mets	6–3	Trachsel (12–5)	Kim (7–8)	Wagner (29)	35,325	59–63
123	August 19	@ Mets	7–4	Heilman (2–4)	Francis (9–10)	Wagner (30)	55,085	59–64
124	August 20	@ Mets	2–0	Hernández (9–9)	Jennings (7–10)	Wagner (31)	40,654	59–65
125	August 22	@ Brewers	4–1	Capuano (11–8)	Cook (8–12)	Cordero (16)	25,158	59–66
126	August 23	@ Brewers	7–1	Sheets (4–5)	Kim (7–9)		35,569	59–67
127	August 24	@ Brewers	12–6	Ohka (4–3)	Fogg (9–8)		35,484	59–68
128	August 25	Padres	13–5	Francis (10–10)	Thompson (3–5)		24,182	60–68
129	August 26	Padres	5–2	Hensley (8–10)	Jennings (7–11)	Hoffman (34)	29,748	60–69
130	August 27	Padres	6–3	Cook (9–12)	Peavy (7–13)		26,308	61–69
131	August 29	Mets	10–5	Trachsel (14–5)	Kim (7–10)		23,454	61–70
132	August 30	Mets	11–3	Williams (4–3)	Fogg (9–9)		22,945	61–71
133	August 31	Mets	8–4	Francis (11–10)	Pérez (2–11)		23,273	62–71

September (14–14)

#	Date	Opponent	Score	Win	Loss	Save	Attendance	Record
134	September 1	@ Dodgers	6–3	Lowe (13–8)	Jennings (7–12)	Saito (17)	49,601	62–72
135	September 2	@ Dodgers	14–5	Penny (15–7)	Cook (9–13)		48,984	62–73
136	September 3	@ Dodgers	12–5	Kim (8–10)	Sele (7–6)		44,895	63–73
137	September 4	@ Padres	7–5	Seánez (3–1)	Fuentes (3–4)		35,722	63–74
138	September 5	@ Padres	5–4	Meredith (4–1)	Francis (11–11)	Hoffman (37)	26,456	63–75
139	September 6	@ Padres	2–0 (11)	Meredith (5–1)	Field (0–1)		27,968	63–76
140	September 7	Nationals	10–5	Corpas (1–1)	Wagner (3–3)		18,617	64–76
141	September 8	Nationals	11–8	Field (1–1)	Rauch (3–4)	Fuentes (24)	22,214	65–76
142	September 9	Nationals	9–5	Venafro (1–0)	Oritz (10–13)		22,735	66–76
143	September 10	Nationals	13–9	Mesa (1–5)	Schroder (0–2)	Fuentes (25)	18,647	67–76
144	September 12	@ Giants	10–6	Correia (2–0)	Bautista (0–3)		33,416	67–77
145	September 13	@ Giants	9–8	Jennings (8–12)	Lowry (7–9)	Fuentes (26)	34,847	68–77
146	September 14	@ Giants	5–0	Cain (13–9)	Cook (9–14)		35,167	68–78
147	September 15	@ Diamondbacks	5–1	Webb (16–6)	Kim (8–11)		22,017	68–79
148	September 16	@ Diamondbacks	7–6 (16)	Julio (2–4)	Affeldt (7–7)		27,822	68–80
149	September 17	@ Diamondbacks	6–1	Francis (12–11)	Batista (10–7)		28,056	69–80
150	September 18	Giants	20–8	Hampson (1–0)	Lowry (7–10)		18,346	70–80
151	September 19	Giants	12–4	Jennings (9–12)	Cain (13–10)	Affeldt (1)	20,373	71–80
152	September 20	Giants	7–4	Wilson (2–3)	Corpas (1–2)	Stanton (8)	19,324	71–81
153	September 21	Braves	6–3	Smoltz (14–9)	Kim (8–12)	Wickman (31)	18,499	71–82
154	September 22	Braves	6–4	Fogg (10–9)	Hudson (12–12)	Fuentes (27)	33,260	72–82
155	September 23	Braves	10–9	Francis (13–11)	Davies (3–6)	Fuentes (28)	24,300	73–82
156	September 24	Braves	9–8	Affeldt (8–7)	Yates (2–5)	Fuentes (29)	30,216	74–82
157	September 26	Dodgers	11–4	Maddux (14–14)	Jennings (9–13)		20,133	74–83
158	September 27	Dodgers	6–4	Lowe (16–8)	Cook (9–15)	Saito (22)	18,858	74–84
159	September 28	Dodgers	19–11	Hendrickson (6–15)	King (1–4)		21,154	74–85
160	September 29	@ Cubs	5–2	Fogg (11–9)	Zambrano (16–7)	Fuentes (30)	33,721	75–85
161	September 30	@ Cubs	11–9 (14)	Ramírez (4–3)	Ryu (0–1)		39,483	76–85

October (0–1)

#	Date	Opponent	Score	Win	Loss	Save	Attendance	Record
162	October 1	@ Cubs	8–5	Aardsma (3–0)	Affeldt (8–8)		39,609	76–86

== Player stats ==
= Indicates team leader

=== Batting ===
==== Starters by position ====
Note: Pos = Position; G = Games played; AB = At bats; H = Hits; Avg. = Batting average; HR = Home runs; RBI = Runs batted in

Pos	Player	G	AB	H	Avg.	HR	RBI
C	Yorvit Torrealba	65	223	55	.247	7	43
1B	Todd Helton	145	546	165	.302	15	81
2B	Jamey Carroll	136	463	139	.300	5	36
SS	Clint Barmes	131	478	105	.220	7	56
3B	Garrett Atkins	157	602	198	.329	20	120
LF	Matt Holliday	155	602	196	.326	34	114
CF	Cory Sullivan	126	386	103	.267	2	30
RF	Brad Hawpe	150	499	146	.293	22	84

==== Other batters ====
Note: G = Games played; AB = At bats; H = Hits; Avg. = Batting average; HR = Home runs; RBI = Runs batted in

Player	G	AB	H	Avg.	HR	RBI
Choo Freeman	88	173	41	.237	2	18
Ryan Spilborghs	67	167	48	.287	4	21
Luis González	61	149	36	.242	2	14
Kazuo Matsui	32	113	39	.345	2	19
Danny Ardoin	35	109	21	.193	0	2
Jason Smith	49	99	26	.263	5	13
JD Closser	32	97	19	.196	2	11
Troy Tulowitzki	25	96	23	.240	1	6
Chris Iannetta	21	77	20	.260	2	10
Miguel Ojeda	25	74	17	.230	2	11
Eli Marrero	30	60	13	.217	4	10
Jorge Piedra	43	59	10	.169	3	10
Jeff Baker	18	57	21	.368	5	21
Jeff Salazar	19	53	15	.283	1	8
Omar Quintanilla	11	34	6	.176	0	3
Vinny Castilla	15	21	4	.190	1	4
Ryan Shealy	5	9	2	.222	0	1
Alvin Colina	2	5	1	.200	0	1

=== Pitching ===
==== Starting pitchers ====
Note: G = Games pitched; IP = Innings pitched; W = Wins; L = Losses; ERA = Earned run average; SO = Strikeouts

Player	G	IP	W	L	ERA	SO
Aaron Cook	32	212.2	9	15	4.23	92
Jason Jennings	32	212.0	9	13	3.78	142
Jeff Francis	32	199.0	13	11	4.16	117
Josh Fogg	31	172.0	11	9	5.49	93
Byung-Hyun Kim	27	155.0	8	12	5.57	129
Zach Day	3	13.1	1	2	10.80	6
Juan Morillo	1	4.0	0	0	15.75	4

==== Other pitchers ====
Note: G = Games pitched; IP = Innings pitched; W = Wins; L = Losses; ERA = Earned run average; SO = Strikeouts

Player	G	IP	W	L	ERA	SO
Justin Hampson	5	12.0	1	0	7.50	9
Miguel Asencio	3	7.2	1	0	4.70	7
Ubaldo Jiménez	2	7.2	0	0	3.52	3
Denny Bautista	4	6.2	0	1	5.40	5

==== Relief pitchers ====
Note: G = Games pitched; W = Wins; L = Losses; SV = Saves; ERA = Earned run average; SO = Strikeouts

Player	G	W	L	SV	ERA	SO
Brian Fuentes	66	3	4	30	3.44	73
José Mesa	79	1	5	1	3.86	39
Tom Martin	68	2	0	0	5.07	46
Ray King	67	1	4	1	4.43	23
Ramón Ramírez	61	4	3	0	3.46	61
Manuel Corpas	35	1	2	0	3.62	27
David Cortés	30	3	1	0	4.30	14
Jeremy Affeldt	27	4	2	1	6.91	20
Scott Dohmann	27	1	1	1	6.20	22
Nate Field	14	1	1	0	4.00	14
Mike Venafro	7	1	0	0	2.45	2
Sun-Woo Kim	6	0	0	0	19.29	4
Mike DeJean	2	1	0	0	0.00	0

== Awards and accomplishments ==
- Colorado Rockies DHL Hometown Hero: Larry Walker

== Farm system ==
Level	Team	League	Manager
AAA	Colorado Springs Sky Sox	Pacific Coast League	Tom Runnells
AA	Tulsa Drillers	Texas League	Stu Cole
A	Modesto Nuts	California League	Chad Kreuter and Glenallen Hill
A	Asheville Tourists	South Atlantic League	Joe Mikulik
A-Short Season	Tri-City Dust Devils	Northwest League	Darron Cox
Rookie	Casper Rockies	Pioneer League	P. J. Carey

Records
Preceded by 2005	Colorado Rockies seasons 2006	Succeeded by 2007
