= Borja =

Borja may refer to:

- Borja (name)
- Borja, Zaragoza, Aragon, Spain
  - Campo de Borja, comarca containing that municipality as capital
- Borja, Peru, Loreto Region, Peru
- Borja (mountain), in Bosnia and Herzegovina
- Borja, Paraguay in Guairá Department, Paraguay
- San Borja (disambiguation), multiple places
