= Samara Colina =

Mexican artist and feminist (1992–2026)

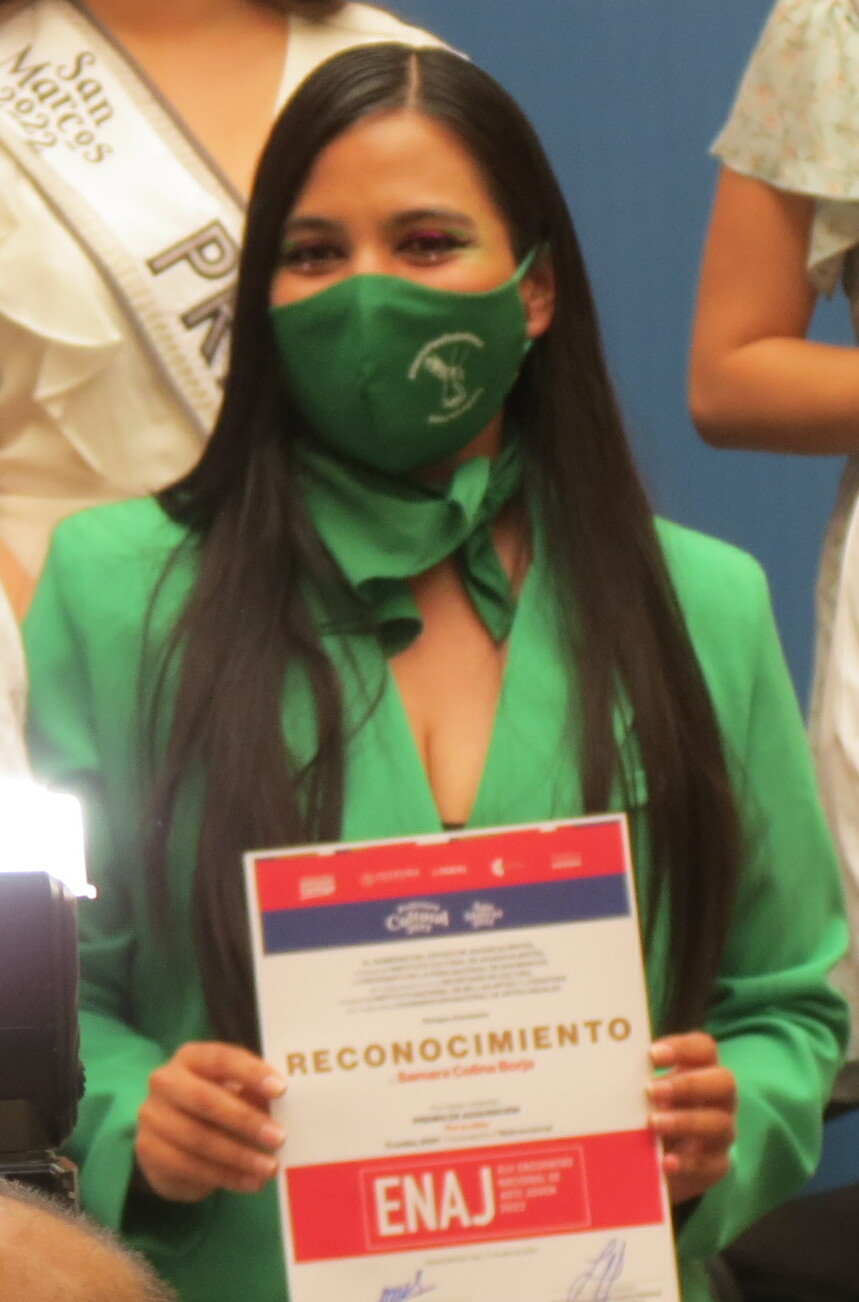
- Colina in 2022
- Born: Samara Colina Borja; 1992; Mexico City, Mexico
- Died: 25 July 2026 (aged 33–34)
- Education: Universidad de Guanajuato; Universidad Autónoma del Estado de Morelos

Samara Colina Borja (Note: In this Mexican name, the surname is Colina and the second or maternal family name is Borja.) (1992 – 27 July 2026) was a Mexican visual artist and feminist. Based in Guanajuato, her work dealt with public gatherings, especially political gatherings, and gender. She won awards from the Encuentro Nacional de Arte Joven in 2020 and 2022 and her work was displayed in various exhibits including at the Museo Tamayo and the Celaya Institute of Art and Culture.

== Education ==
Colina studied visual arts at Universidad de Guanajuato, graduating with a bachelor's degree in 2018. She then studied art production at the Universidad Autónoma del Estado de Morelos, graduating with a master's degree in 2022. She also studied with SOMA México in 2025, a contemporary arts school founded by Yoshua Okón.

== Art ==
Colina was a painter who was inspired by pointillism and Neo-Impressionism in her work. In general, she focused her paintings on crowds, especially political gatherings, social movements, human rights and, later in her career, feminism and gender. She painted people and crowds as landscapes instead of portraits. She had become interested in art and politics as a child, attending marches with her parents and visiting museums in Guanajuato.

Colina won one of the four acquisition prizes at the 2020 Encuentro Nacional de Arte Joven, organized by the government of Aguascalientes and the Instituto Nacional de Bellas Artes y Literatura with her piece Coreografía No. 5. She won again at the 2022 convention with her painting Tromba. She also won third place at the 2021 VIII Bienal Internacional de Arte Visual Universitario and in 2024 at the La Trienal de Tijuana: Internacional Pictórica with her piece Pese a todo, la alegría del encuentro. This award in particular raised her profile.

After spending five years painting gatherings at marches and protests, Colina created a series of eight paintings of groups of women which formed her exhibition Entre fieras y basiliscos (transl. Between wild animals and basilisks), displayed in 2023 at the Artwrks virtual gallery. Paintings of women in public spaces also formed the basis for the Estas ruinas que vemos exhibit Colina participated in at the Celaya Institute of Art and Culture, again in 2023. Estas ruinas que vemos, a series of 13 paintings of women, was created by Colina to counter the dominance of male figures in public art in Guanajuato, featuring real and fictional men in monuments and sculptures, while female representation was limited and often relegated to symbolic representations of womanhood and woman's roles. In the lead up to the exhibit of these 13 paintings, she posted metal plaques to rename the female statues on top of the Teatro Juárez in honor of various noteworthy Guanajuato women. In 2025, she created two series of paintings for her exhibition Pulpa at the RAB 63 gallery in Mexico City: one analyzing the presence of women in Mexican coats of arms (Tengo sed de mí) and the other about women's desires. When speaking of the exhibit, Colina said that she "like[d] that my painting cannot be explained with words".

In July 2026, several months after she had been diagnosed with cancer, Colina stated she had been working on a series of paintings based on her illness.

=== Exhibitions ===
- Entre fieras y basiliscos (2023, at the Artwrks virtual gallery)
- Estas ruinas que vemos (2023, at the Celaya Institute of Art and Culture, Celaya)
- Constructoras de universos (2023, Guanajuato)
- Cuerpox (2024, Punto Magnolia Tepito in Mexico City)
- Pulpa (2025, RAB 63 in Colonia Santa María la Ribera, Mexico City)
- The Gesture and the Invisible (2026, at the Museo Tamayo, Mexico City)
- Pintura y política (2026)
- Uno más uno (Jesús Gallardo Gallery at the University of Guanajuato)
- Almenara (Casa Equis, Mexico City)

== Personal life and death ==
Colina Borja was born in 1992 in Mexico City, Mexico. She grew up in the city of Guanajuato, where she later lived and worked. She was a member of the Verde Aquelarre and Arena en la Vagina feminist collectives.

Colina announced in March 2026 that she had been diagnosed with acute lymphoblastic leukemia. She underwent treatment and had been hospitalized in León. Colina died on 27 July 2026.
