= 2006 San Diego Padres season =

2006 San Diego Padres
- National League West champions
- League: National League
- Division: West
- Ballpark: Petco Park
- City: San Diego, California
- Record: 88–74 (.543)
- Divisional place: 1st
- Owners: John Moores
- General managers: Kevin Towers
- Managers: Bruce Bochy
- Television: 4SD (Mark Grant, Matt Vasgersian)
- Radio: XEPRS-AM (Jerry Coleman, Ted Leitner, Tim Flannery); XEMO (Juan Angel Avila, Eduardo Ortega)

The 2006 San Diego Padres season was the 38th season in franchise history. The Padres captured their second consecutive National League West title, with a record of 88–74, tied with the Los Angeles Dodgers by virtue of winning the season series 13–5 against the Dodgers. The 2006 season also marked the end of Bruce Bochy's tenure as manager of the team, after 24 seasons overall, 12 seasons as manager (1995–2006), winning 4 division titles (1996, 1998, 2005, 2006). The Padres were eliminated in the NLDS by the eventual World Series champion St. Louis Cardinals, losing 3–1. The Padres would not make the playoffs again until 2020.

== Offseason ==
- November 18, 2005: Xavier Nady was traded by the San Diego Padres to the New York Mets for Mike Cameron.
- December 2, 2005: Pete LaForest was selected off waivers by the San Diego Padres from the Tampa Bay Devil Rays.
- December 5, 2005: Brian Giles was signed as a free agent with the San Diego Padres.
- December 7, 2005: Dewon Brazelton was traded by the Tampa Bay Devil Rays to the San Diego Padres for Sean Burroughs.
- December 22, 2005: Mark Bellhorn was signed as a free agent with the San Diego Padres.
- January 4, 2006: Adam Eaton, Akinori Otsuka, and Billy Killian were traded to the Texas Rangers in exchange for Adrián González, Chris Young, and Terrmel Sledge.
- January 12, 2006: Alan Embree was signed as a free agent with the San Diego Padres.
- February 3, 2006: Mike Piazza signed as a free agent with the San Diego Padres.
- May 1, 2006: Doug Mirabelli was traded to the Boston Red Sox in exchange for Josh Bard and Cla Meredith.

== Regular season ==
=== Opening Day starters ===
Played at Petco Park on April 3, 2006 against the San Francisco Giants.

Player	Pos
Dave Roberts	CF
Eric Young	LF
Brian Giles	RF
Mike Piazza	C
Adrián González	1B
Khalil Greene	SS
Vinny Castilla	3B
Josh Barfield	2B
Jake Peavy	P

San Diego 6, San Francisco 1

=== Season standings ===
==== National League West ====
NL West
Team	W	L	Pct.	GB	Home	Road
San Diego Padres	88	74	.543	—	43‍–‍38	45‍–‍36
Los Angeles Dodgers	88	74	.543	—	49‍–‍32	39‍–‍42
San Francisco Giants	76	85	.472	11½	43‍–‍38	33‍–‍47
Arizona Diamondbacks	76	86	.469	12	39‍–‍42	37‍–‍44
Colorado Rockies	76	86	.469	12	44‍–‍37	32‍–‍49

- NOTE: Although the Padres final record equaled that of the Los Angeles Dodgers, the Padres record of 13-5 against the Dodgers awarded them the official division title.

==== Record vs. opponents ====
2006 National League record Source: MLB Standings Grid – 2006
Team	AZ	ATL	CHC	CIN	COL	FLA	HOU	LAD	MIL	NYM	PHI	PIT	SD	SF	STL	WAS	AL
Arizona	—	6–1	4–2	4–2	12–7	2–4	4–5	8–10	3–3	1–6	1–5	5–1	9–10	8–11	4–3	1–5	4–11
Atlanta	1–6	—	6–1	4–3	3–3	11–8	3–4	3–3	2–4	7–11	7–11	3–3	7–2	3–4	4–2	10–8	5–10
Chicago	2–4	1–6	—	10–9	2–4	2–4	7–8	4–2	8–8	3–3	2–5	6–9	0–7	2–4	11–8	2–4	4–11
Cincinnati	2–4	3–4	9–10	—	5–1	4–2	10–5	0–6	9–10	3–4	2–4	9–7	2–4	2–5	9–6	5–1	6-9
Colorado	7–12	3–3	4–2	1–5	—	3–3	4–2	4–15	2–4	1–5	3–4	3–3	10–9	10–8	2–7	8–0	11–4
Florida	4–2	8–11	4–2	2–4	3–3	—	3–4	1–5	7–0	8–11	6–13	5–2	3–3	3–3	1–5	11–7	9–9
Houston	5–4	4–3	8–7	5–10	2–4	4-3	—	3–3	10–5	2–4	2–4	13–3	3–3	1–5	9–7	4–4	7–11
Los Angeles	10–8	3–3	2–4	6–0	15–4	5–1	3–3	—	4–2	3–4	4–3	6–4	5–13	13–6	0–7	4–2	5–10
Milwaukee	3–3	4–2	8–8	10–9	4–2	0–7	5–10	2–4	—	3–3	5–1	7–9	4–3	6–3	7–9	1–5	6–9
New York	6–1	11–7	3–3	4–3	5–1	11–8	4–2	4–3	3–3	—	11–8	5–4	5–2	3–3	4–2	12–6	6–9
Philadelphia	5-1	11–7	5–2	4–2	4–3	13–6	4–2	3–4	1–5	8–11	—	3–3	2–4	5–1	3–3	9–10	5–13
Pittsburgh	1–5	3–3	9–6	7–9	3–3	2–5	3–13	4–6	9–7	4–5	3–3	—	1–5	6–1	6–9	3–3	3–12
San Diego	10–9	2–7	7–0	4–2	9–10	3–3	3–3	13–5	3–4	2–5	4–2	5–1	—	7–12	4–2	5–1	7–8
San Francisco	11–8	4–3	4–2	5–2	8–10	3–3	5–1	6–13	3–6	3–3	1–5	1–6	12–7	—	1–4	1–5	8–7
St. Louis	3–4	2–4	8–11	6–9	7–2	5-1	7–9	7–0	9–7	2–4	3–3	9–6	2–4	4–1	—	4–3	5–10
Washington	5–1	8–10	4–2	1–5	0–8	7-11	4–4	2–4	5–1	6–12	10–9	3–3	1–5	5–1	3–4	—	7–11

=== Transactions ===
- June 6, 2006: David Freese was drafted in the 9th round of the 2006 amateur draft.
- August 24, 2006: Russell Branyan was traded by the Tampa Bay Devil Rays to the San Diego Padres for a player to be named later and Evan Meek (minors). The San Diego Padres sent Dale Thayer (minors) (September 15, 2006) to the Tampa Bay Devil Rays to complete the trade.

=== Game log ===
2006 Game Log
April (9–15)

#	Date	Opponent	Score	Win	Loss	Save	Attendance	Record
1	April 3	Giants	6–1					1–0
2	April 5	Giants	1–3					1–1
3	April 7	Rockies	4–10					1–2
4	April 8	Rockies	4–12					1–3
5	April 9	Rockies	4–10					1–4
6	April 11	@ Marlins	9–3					2–4
7	April 12	@ Marlins	7–2					3–4
8	April 13	@ Marlins	2–9					3–5
9	April 14	@ Braves	4–5					3–6
10	April 15	@ Braves	0–2					3–7
11	April 16	@ Braves	4–3					4–7
12	April 17	@ Rockies	5–2					5–7
13	April 18	@ Rockies	2–3					5–8
14	April 19	@ Rockies	13–4					6–8
15	April 20	Mets	2–7					6–9
16	April 21	Mets	2–1					7–9
17	April 22	Mets	1–8					7–10
18	April 23	Mets	7–4					8–10
19	April 24	Dbacks	1–4					8–11
20	April 25	Dbacks	0–7					8–12
21	April 26	Dbacks	2–3					8–13
22	April 28	Dodgers	0–3					8–14
23	April 29	Dodgers	2–4					8–15
24	April 30	Dodgers	6–5					9–15

May (19–10)

#	Date	Opponent	Score	Win	Loss	Save	Attendance	Record
25	May 1	@ Giants	10–4					10–15
26	May 2	@ Giants	5–3					11–15
27	May 3	@ Dodgers	11–5					12–15
28	May 4	@ Dodgers	3–0					13–15
29	May 5	Cubs	1–0					14–15
30	May 6	Cubs	2–1					15–15
31	May 7	Cubs	6–3					16–15
32	May 8	Cubs	8–3					17–15
33	May 9	Brewers	4–5					17–16
34	May 10	Brewers	3–0					18–16
35	May 11	Brewers	8–5					19–16
36	May 12	@ Cubs	10–5					20–16
37	May 13	@ Cubs	4–3					21–16
38	May 14	@ Cubs	9–0					22–16
39	May 15	@ Dbacks	5–6					22–17
40	May 16	@ Dbacks	2–5					22–18
41	May 17	@ Dbacks	14–10					23–18
42	May 19	@ Mariners	4–7					23–19
43	May 20	@ Mariners	3–6					23–20
44	May 21	@ Mariners	8–10					23–21
45	May 22	Braves	1–3					23–22
46	May 23	Braves	2–1					24–22
47	May 24	Braves	6–10					24–23
48	May 26	Cardinals	7–1					25–23
49	May 27	Cardinals	3–4					25–24
50	May 28	Cardinals	10–8					26–24
51	May 29	Rockies	0–5					26–25
52	May 30	Rockies	2–0					27–25
53	May 31	Rockies	3–2					28–25

June (14–12)

#	Date	Opponent	Score	Win	Loss	Save	Attendance	Record
54	June 2	@ Pirates	7–0					29–25
55	June 3	@ Pirates	4–6					29–26
56	June 4	@ Pirates	1–0					30–26
57	June 5	@ Brewers	2–5					30–27
58	June 6	@ Brewers	1–5					30–28
59	June 7	@ Brewers	6–5					31–28
60	June 8	@ Brewers	3–4					31–29
61	June 9	Marlins	3–2					32–29
62	June 10	Marlins	1–2					32–30
63	June 11	Marlins	3–7					32–31
64	June 13	Dodgers	9–1					33–31
65	June 14	Dodgers	5–3					34–31
66	June 15	Dodgers	3–7					34–32
67	June 16	@ Angels	5–4					35–32
68	June 17	@ Angels	2–3					35–33
69	June 18	@ Angels	7–3					36–33
70	June 20	@ Rangers	6–5					37–33
71	June 21	@ Rangers	3–2					38–33
72	June 22	@ Rangers	3–5					38–34
73	June 23	Mariners	2–1					39–34
74	June 24	Mariners	5–9					39–35
75	June 25	Mariners	4–9					39–36
76	June 27	Athletics	3–0					40–36
77	June 28	Athletics	8–1					41–36
78	June 29	Athletics	5–6					41–37
79	June 30	Giants	6–5					42–37

July (13–13)

#	Date	Opponent	Score	Win	Loss	Save	Attendance	Record
80	July 1 (1)	Giants	7–4					43–37
81	July 1 (2)	Giants	1–4					43–38
82	July 2	Giants	2–6					43–39
83	July 4	@ Phillies	5–6					43–40
84	July 5	@ Phillies	6–3					44–40
85	July 6	@ Phillies	5–3					45–40
86	July 7	@ Nationals	3–2					46–40
87	July 8	@ Nationals	5–2					47–40
88	July 9	@ Nationals	10–9					48–40
89	July 14	Braves	12–15					48–41
90	July 15	Braves	3–11					48–42
91	July 16	Braves	5–10					48–43
92	July 17	Phillies	8–6					49–43
93	July 18	Phillies	10–6					50–43
94	July 19	Phillies	4–5					50–44
95	July 20	@ Giants	3–9					50–45
96	July 21	@ Giants	2–8					50–46
97	July 22	@ Giants	3–4					50–47
98	July 23	@ Giants	6–5					51–47
99	July 24	@ Dodgers	7–6					52–47
100	July 25	@ Dodgers	7–3					53–47
101	July 26	@ Dodgers	10–3					54–47
102	July 27	@ Rockies	8–9					54–48
103	July 28	@ Rockies	1–3					54–49
104	July 29	@ Rockies	4–2					55–49
105	July 30	@ Rockies	1–3					55–50

August (13–15)

#	Date	Opponent	Score	Win	Loss	Save	Attendance	Record
106	August 1	Astros	0–1					55–51
107	August 2	Astros	1–7					55–52
108	August 3	Astros	5–2					56–52
109	August 4	Nationals	2–6					56–53
110	August 5	Nationals	6–3					57–53
111	August 6	Nationals	3–2					58–53
112	August 8	@ Mets	2–3					58–54
113	August 9	@ Mets	3–4					58–55
114	August 10	@ Mets	3–7					58–56
115	August 11	@ Astros	2–4					58–57
116	August 12	@ Astros	6–3					59–57
117	August 13	@ Astros	7–2					60–57
118	August 14	Giants	0–1					60–58
119	August 15	Giants	2–3					60–59
120	August 16	Giants	5–7					60–60
121	August 17	Giants	4–8					60–61
122	August 18	Dbacks	8–2					61–61
123	August 19	Dbacks	3–5					61–62
124	August 20	Dbacks	2–1					62–62
125	August 21	Dodgers	4–2					63–62
126	August 22	Dodgers	1–0					64–62
127	August 23	Dodgers	7–2					65–62
128	August 25	@ Rockies	5–13					65–63
129	August 26	@ Rockies	5–2					66–63
130	August 27	@ Rockies	3–6					66–64
131	August 28	@ Dbacks	4–7					66–65
132	August 29	@ Dbacks	8–3					67–65
133	August 30	@ Dbacks	4–1					68–65

September/October (20–9)

#	Date	Opponent	Score	Win	Loss	Save	Attendance	Record
134	September 1	Reds	2–6					68–66
135	September 2	Reds	7–1					69–66
136	September 3	Reds	2–1					70–66
137	September 4	Rockies	7–5					71–66
138	September 5	Rockies	5–4					72–66
139	September 6	Rockies	2–0					73–66
140	September 8	@ Giants	0–4					73–67
141	September 9	@ Giants	4–5					73–68
142	September 10	@ Giants	10–2					74–68
143	September 12	@ Reds	4–5					74–69
144	September 13	@ Reds	10–0					75–69
145	September 14	@ Reds	4–2					76–69
146	September 15	@ Dodgers	1–3					76–70
147	September 16	@ Dodgers	11–2					77–70
148	September 17	@ Dodgers	2–1					78–70
149	September 18	@ Dodgers	10–11					78–71
150	September 19	Dbacks	5–2					79–71
151	September 20	Dbacks	2–8					79–72
152	September 21	Dbacks	3–1					80–72
153	September 22	Pirates	6–2					81–72
154	September 23	Pirates	2–1					82–72
155	September 24	Pirates	2–1					83–72
156	September 25	@ Cardinals	6–5					84–72
157	September 26	@ Cardinals	7–5					85–72
158	September 27	@ Cardinals	2–4					85–73
159	September 28	@ Dbacks	12–4					86–73
160	September 29	@ Dbacks	1–3					86–74
161	September 30	@ Dbacks	3–1					87–74
162	October 1	@ Dbacks	7–6					88–74

=== Postseason Game Log ===
2006 Postseason Game Log
NLDS (1–3)

#	Date	Opponent	Score	Win	Loss	Save	Attendance	Record
1	October 3	Cardinals	1–5					0–1
2	October 5	Cardinals	0–2					0–2
3	October 7	@ Cardinals	3–1					1–2
4	October 8	@ Cardinals	2–6					1–3

=== Roster ===
2006 San Diego Padres
Roster
Pitchers: 57 Jon Adkins; 45 Dewon Brazelton; 26 Doug Brocail; 46 Jim Brower; 56 Scott Cassidy; 41 Alan Embree; 55 Shawn Estes; 52 Clay Hensley; 51 Trevor Hoffman; 38 Scott Linebrink; 43 Cla Meredith; 61 Chan Ho Park; 44 Jake Peavy; 37 Rudy Seánez; 50 Brian Sikorski; 54 Tim Stauffer; 49 Brian Sweeney; 39 Mike Thompson; 21 David Wells; 17 Woody Williams; 50 Scott Williamson; 32 Chris Young	Catchers: 28 Josh Bard; 14 Rob Bowen; 28 Doug Mirabelli; 33 Mike Piazza; Infielders: 20 Manny Alexander; 29 Josh Barfield; 16 Mark Bellhorn; 27 Geoff Blum; 34 Russell Branyan; 9 Vinny Castilla; 23 Adrián González; 3 Khalil Greene; 7 Todd Walker	Outfielders: 25 Mike Cameron; 9 Jack Cust; 24 Brian Giles; 4 Ben Johnson; 18 Paul McAnulty; 10 Dave Roberts; 8 Terrmel Sledge; 7 Eric Young; Other batters: 30 Ryan Klesko; 2 Jon Knott; 12 Justin Leone	Manager: 15 Bruce Bochy; Coaches: 48 Darrel Akerfelds (bullpen); 36 Darren Balsley (pitching); 47 Glenn Hoffman (third base); 12 Dave Magadan (hitting); 40 Tony Muser (bench); 11 Merv Rettenmund; 22 Tye Waller (first base)

== Player stats ==
=== Batting ===
==== Starters by position ====
Note: Pos = Position; G = Games played; AB = At bats; H = Hits; Avg. = Batting average; HR = Home runs; RBI = Runs batted in

Pos	Player	G	AB	H	Avg.	HR	RBI
C	Mike Piazza	126	399	113	.283	22	68
1B	Adrián González	156	570	173	.304	24	82
2B	Josh Barfield	150	539	151	.280	13	58
SS	Khalil Greene	121	412	101	.245	15	55
3B	Vinny Castilla	72	254	59	.232	4	23
LF	Dave Roberts	129	499	146	.293	2	44
CF	Mike Cameron	141	552	148	.268	22	83
RF	Brian Giles	158	604	159	.263	14	83

==== Other batters ====
Note: G = Games played; AB = At bats; H = Hits; Avg. = Batting average; HR = Home runs; RBI = Runs batted in

Player	G	AB	H	Avg.	HR	RBI
Geoff Blum	109	276	70	.254	4	34
Mark Bellhorn	115	253	48	.190	8	27
Josh Bard	93	231	78	.338	9	40
Eric Young Sr.	56	128	26	.203	3	13
Todd Walker	44	124	35	.282	3	13
Ben Johnson	58	120	30	.250	4	12
Rob Bowen	94	94	23	.245	3	13
Russell Branyan	27	72	21	.292	6	9
Terrmel Sledge	38	70	16	.229	2	7
Manny Alexander	22	34	6	.176	0	4
Doug Mirabelli	14	22	4	.182	0	0
Paul McAnulty	16	13	3	.231	1	3
Ryan Klesko	6	4	3	.750	0	2
Jack Cust	4	3	1	.333	0	0
Jon Knott	3	3	0	.000	0	0
Justin Leone	1	1	0	.000	0	0

=== Pitching ===
==== Starting pitchers ====
Note: G = Games pitched; IP = Innings pitched; W = Wins; L = Losses; ERA = Earned run average; SO = Strikeouts

Player	G	IP	W	L	ERA	SO
Jake Peavy	32	202.1	11	14	4.09	215
Clay Hensley	37	187.0	11	12	3.71	122
Chris Young	31	179.1	11	5	3.46	164
Woody Williams	25	145.1	12	5	3.65	72
Chan Ho Park	24	136.2	7	7	4.81	96
Mike Thompson	19	92.0	4	5	4.99	35
David Wells	5	28.1	1	2	3.49	14
Shawn Estes	1	6.0	0	1	4.50	4
Tim Stauffer	1	6.0	1	0	1.50	2

==== Other pitchers ====
Note: G = Games pitched; IP = Innings pitched; W = Wins; L = Losses; ERA = Earned run average; SO = Strikeouts

Player	G	IP	W	L	ERA	SO
Dewon Brazelton	9	18.0	0	2	12.00	9

==== Relief pitchers ====
Note: G = Games pitched; W = Wins; L = Losses; SV = Saves; ERA = Earned run average; SO = Strikeouts

Player	G	W	L	SV	ERA	SO
Trevor Hoffman	65	0	2	46	2.14	50
Scott Linebrink	73	7	4	2	3.57	68
Alan Embree	73	4	3	0	3.27	53
Jon Adkins	55	2	1	0	3.98	30
Cla Meredith	45	5	1	0	1.07	37
Scott Cassidy	42	6	4	0	2.53	49
Brian Sweeney	37	2	0	2	3.20	23
Doug Brocail	25	2	2	0	4.76	19
Brian Sikorski	13	1	1	0	5.65	14
Scott Williamson	11	0	1	0	7.36	10
Rudy Seánez	8	1	2	0	5.68	6
Jim Brower	6	0	0	0	9.39	5

== National League Division Series ==
=== San Diego Padres vs. St. Louis Cardinals ===
St. Louis wins the series, 3-1

Game	Score	Date	Location	Attendance
1	St. Louis Cardinals – 5, San Diego Padres – 1	October 3	Petco Park	43,107
2	St. Louis Cardinals – 2, San Diego Padres – 0	October 5	Petco Park	43,463
3	San Diego Padres – 3, St. Louis Cardinals – 1	October 7	Busch Stadium III	46,634
4	San Diego Padres – 2, St. Louis Cardinals – 6	October 8	Busch Stadium III	46,476

== Award winners ==
=== Rawlings Gold Glove Winners ===
- Mike Cameron, OF

=== National League Fireman of the Year ===
- Trevor Hoffman, The Sporting News, Rolaids

=== National League Pitcher of the Month ===
- Chris Young, May 2006

2006 Major League Baseball All-Star Game

- Trevor Hoffman, reserve

== Farm system ==
Level	Team	League	Manager
AAA	Portland Beavers	Pacific Coast League	Craig Colbert
AA	Mobile BayBears	Southern League	Gary Jones
A	Lake Elsinore Storm	California League	Rick Renteria
A	Fort Wayne Wizards	Midwest League	Randy Ready
A-Short Season	Eugene Emeralds	Northwest League	Doug Dascenzo
Rookie	AZL Padres	Arizona League	Carlos Lezcano

LEAGUE CHAMPIONS: AZL Padres
