= 2006 St. Louis Cardinals season =

Major League Baseball season

2006 St. Louis Cardinals
- World Series champions National League champions National League Central champions
- League: National League
- Division: Central
- Ballpark: Busch Stadium
- City: St. Louis, Missouri
- Record: 83–78 (.516)
- Divisional place: 1st
- Owners: Bill DeWitt
- General managers: Walt Jocketty
- Managers: Tony La Russa
- Television: FSN Midwest (Dan McLaughlin, Al Hrabosky, Joe Buck); KPLR (Ricky Horton, Wayne Hagin)
- Radio: KTRS (Mike Shannon, John Rooney)

The 2006 St. Louis Cardinals season was the 125th season for the St. Louis Cardinals, a Major League Baseball franchise in St. Louis, Missouri. It was the 115th season for the Cardinals in the National League and their 1st at Busch Stadium III.

The season started out with a bang, as the team raced out to a 31–16 record by late May. Momentum would be slowed by injuries, as starting pitcher Mark Mulder was lost for the year, while center fielder Jim Edmonds and shortstop David Eckstein missed large amounts of playing time in the second half. Poor performance from several key players also hampered the team: starting pitcher Jason Marquis compiled a 6.02 ERA, starting pitcher Sidney Ponson was cut due to ineffectiveness, closer Jason Isringhausen blew ten saves before undergoing season-ending hip surgery in September, and catcher Yadier Molina had a poor offensive year, batting .216.

All this led to a difficult season, despite that quick start, one that included two eight-game losing streaks (the longest such streaks for the franchise since 1988) and a seven-game losing streak, losing months in June, August and September, and an 83-78 record, the worst for the Cardinals since the 1999 team finished 75–86. However, that record was still good enough to finish first in a weak National League Central; the Houston Astros were the only other team in the division with a winning record. On the season's final day, the Cardinals made the playoffs for the sixth time in the last seven seasons, edging the second-place Astros by a game and a half. Once the playoffs began, the lightly regarded Cardinals surprised baseball fans everywhere by beating the San Diego Padres in the four-game NLDS, beating the New York Mets in the seven-game NLCS, and beating the Detroit Tigers in the World Series four games to one, winning the tenth, and probably most unlikely, World Series championship in franchise history. Their .516 winning percentage is the lowest ever for a World Series champion. This season ironically contrasted with 2004 as that team was considered the overwhelming favorites but were swept in the World Series, resulting in a bittersweet three-year period for the Cardinals.

Following the season, the Cardinals ended a 19-year association with KPLR and returned to KSDK for the first time since 1987.

== Regular season ==
=== Season standings ===
==== National League Central ====
NL Central
Team	W	L	Pct.	GB	Home	Road
St. Louis Cardinals	83	78	.516	—	49‍–‍31	34‍–‍47
Houston Astros	82	80	.506	1½	44‍–‍37	38‍–‍43
Cincinnati Reds	80	82	.494	3½	42‍–‍39	38‍–‍43
Milwaukee Brewers	75	87	.463	8½	48‍–‍33	27‍–‍54
Pittsburgh Pirates	67	95	.414	16½	43‍–‍38	24‍–‍57
Chicago Cubs	66	96	.407	17½	36‍–‍45	30‍–‍51

==== Record vs. opponents ====
2006 National League record Source: MLB Standings Grid – 2006
Team	AZ	ATL	CHC	CIN	COL	FLA	HOU	LAD	MIL	NYM	PHI	PIT	SD	SF	STL	WAS	AL
Arizona	—	6–1	4–2	4–2	12–7	2–4	4–5	8–10	3–3	1–6	1–5	5–1	9–10	8–11	4–3	1–5	4–11
Atlanta	1–6	—	6–1	4–3	3–3	11–8	3–4	3–3	2–4	7–11	7–11	3–3	7–2	3–4	4–2	10–8	5–10
Chicago	2–4	1–6	—	10–9	2–4	2–4	7–8	4–2	8–8	3–3	2–5	6–9	0–7	2–4	11–8	2–4	4–11
Cincinnati	2–4	3–4	9–10	—	5–1	4–2	10–5	0–6	9–10	3–4	2–4	9–7	2–4	2–5	9–6	5–1	6-9
Colorado	7–12	3–3	4–2	1–5	—	3–3	4–2	4–15	2–4	1–5	3–4	3–3	10–9	10–8	2–7	8–0	11–4
Florida	4–2	8–11	4–2	2–4	3–3	—	3–4	1–5	7–0	8–11	6–13	5–2	3–3	3–3	1–5	11–7	9–9
Houston	5–4	4–3	8–7	5–10	2–4	4-3	—	3–3	10–5	2–4	2–4	13–3	3–3	1–5	9–7	4–4	7–11
Los Angeles	10–8	3–3	2–4	6–0	15–4	5–1	3–3	—	4–2	3–4	4–3	6–4	5–13	13–6	0–7	4–2	5–10
Milwaukee	3–3	4–2	8–8	10–9	4–2	0–7	5–10	2–4	—	3–3	5–1	7–9	4–3	6–3	7–9	1–5	6–9
New York	6–1	11–7	3–3	4–3	5–1	11–8	4–2	4–3	3–3	—	11–8	5–4	5–2	3–3	4–2	12–6	6–9
Philadelphia	5-1	11–7	5–2	4–2	4–3	13–6	4–2	3–4	1–5	8–11	—	3–3	2–4	5–1	3–3	9–10	5–13
Pittsburgh	1–5	3–3	9–6	7–9	3–3	2–5	3–13	4–6	9–7	4–5	3–3	—	1–5	6–1	6–9	3–3	3–12
San Diego	10–9	2–7	7–0	4–2	9–10	3–3	3–3	13–5	3–4	2–5	4–2	5–1	—	7–12	4–2	5–1	7–8
San Francisco	11–8	4–3	4–2	5–2	8–10	3–3	5–1	6–13	3–6	3–3	1–5	1–6	12–7	—	1–4	1–5	8–7
St. Louis	3–4	2–4	8–11	6–9	7–2	5-1	7–9	7–0	9–7	2–4	3–3	9–6	2–4	4–1	—	4–3	5–10
Washington	5–1	8–10	4–2	1–5	0–8	7-11	4–4	2–4	5–1	6–12	10–9	3–3	1–5	5–1	3–4	—	7–11

=== Roster ===
2006 St. Louis Cardinals
Roster
Pitchers: 29 Chris Carpenter; 40 Brian Falkenborg; 34 Randy Flores; 32 Josh Hancock; 44 Jason Isringhausen; 61 Tyler Johnson; 52 Josh Kinney; 41 Braden Looper; 21 Jason Marquis; 30 Mark Mulder; 60 Chris Narveson; 13 Sidney Ponson; 23 Anthony Reyes; 73 Ricardo Rincón; 31 Jorge Sosa; 37 Jeff Suppan; 48 Brad Thompson; 50 Adam Wainwright; 36 Jeff Weaver	Catchers: 28 Gary Bennett; 4 Yadier Molina; 46 Mike Rose; Infielders: 7 Ronnie Belliard; 22 David Eckstein; 12 Aaron Miles; 62 John Nelson; 5 Albert Pujols; 27 Scott Rolen; 26 Scott Spiezio; 35,13 José Vizcaíno	Outfielders: 33 Larry Bigbie; 16 Chris Duncan; 15 Jim Edmonds; 43 Juan Encarnación; 31 John Gall; 19 Timo Pérez; 53 John Rodriguez; 55 Skip Schumaker; 99 So Taguchi; 3 Preston Wilson	Manager: 10 Tony La Russa; Coaches: 18 Dave Duncan (pitching); 38 Marty Mason (bullpen); 39 Dave McKay (first base); 8 Hal McRae (hitting); 11 José Oquendo (third base); 24 Joe Pettini (bench); 59 Dan Held (bullpen assistant)

== Player stats ==
=== Batting ===
Note: G = Games played; AB = At bats; R = Runs; H = Hits; 2B = Doubles; 3B = Triples; HR = Home runs; RBI = Runs batted in; SB = Stolen bases; BB = Walks; AVG = Batting average; SLG = Slugging average

Player	G	AB	R	H	2B	3B	HR	RBI	SB	BB	AVG	SLG
Juan Encarnación	153	557	74	155	25	5	19	79	6	30	.278	.443
Albert Pujols	143	535	119	177	33	1	49	137	7	92	.331	.671
Scott Rolen	142	521	94	154	48	1	22	95	7	56	.296	.518
David Eckstein	123	500	68	146	18	1	2	23	7	31	.292	.344
Aaron Miles	135	426	48	112	20	5	2	30	2	38	.263	.347
Yadier Molina	129	417	29	90	26	0	6	49	1	26	.216	.321
Jim Edmonds	110	350	52	90	18	0	19	70	4	53	.257	.471
So Taguchi	134	316	46	84	19	1	2	31	11	32	.266	.351
Chris Duncan	90	280	60	82	11	3	22	43	0	30	.293	.589
Scott Spezio	119	276	44	75	15	4	13	52	1	37	.272	.496
Héctor Luna	76	223	27	65	14	1	4	21	5	21	.291	.417
Ronnie Belliard	54	194	20	46	9	1	5	23	0	15	.237	.371`
John Rodriguez	102	183	31	55	12	3	2	19	0	21	.301	.432
Gary Bennett	60	157	13	35	5	0	4	22	0	11	.223	.331
Preston Wilson	33	111	18	27	3	0	8	17	6	7	.243	.486
Skip Schumaker	28	54	3	10	1	0	1	2	2	5	.185	.259
Timo Pérez	23	31	3	6	1	0	1	3	0	3	.194	.323
Larry Bigbie	17	25	2	6	1	0	0	1	0	3	.240	.280
José Vizcaíno	16	23	3	8	3	0	1	3	0	1	.348	.609
John Gall	8	12	1	3	0	0	0	1	0	0	.250	.250
Mike Rose	10	9	0	2	0	0	0	1	0	0	.222	.222
John Nelson	8	5	2	0	0	0	0	0	0	0	.000	.000
Pitcher totals	161	317	24	56	10	1	2	23	0	19	.177	.233
Team totals	161	5522	781	1484	292	27	184	745	59	531	.269	.431

=== Pitching ===
Note: W = Wins; L = Losses; ERA = Earned run average; G = Games pitched; GS = Games started; SV = Saves; IP = Innings pitched; H = Hits allowed; R = Runs allowed; ER = Earned runs allowed; BB = Walks allowed; SO = Strikeouts

Player	W	L	ERA	G	GS	SV	IP	H	R	ER	BB	SO
Chris Carpenter	15	8	3.09	32	32	0	221.2	194	81	76	43	184
Jason Marquis	14	16	6.02	33	33	0	194.1	221	136	130	75	96
Jeff Suppan	12	7	4.12	32	32	0	190.0	207	100	87	69	104
Mark Mulder	6	7	7.14	17	17	0	93.1	124	77	74	35	50
Anthony Reyes	5	8	5.06	17	17	0	85.1	84	48	48	34	72
Jeff Weaver	5	4	5.18	15	15	0	83.1	99	49	48	26	45
Josh Hancock	3	3	4.09	62	0	1	77.0	70	37	35	23	50
Adam Wainwright	2	1	3.12	61	0	3	75.0	64	26	26	22	72
Braden Looper	9	3	3.56	69	0	0	73.1	76	30	29	20	41
Sidney Ponson	4	4	5.24	14	13	0	68.2	82	42	40	29	33
Jason Isringhausen	4	8	3.55	59	0	33	58.1	47	25	23	38	52
Brad Thompson	1	2	3.34	43	1	0	56.2	58	23	21	20	32
Randy Flores	1	1	5.62	65	0	0	41.2	49	29	26	22	40
Tyler Johnson	2	4	4.95	56	0	0	36.1	33	21	20	23	37
Jorge Sosa	0	1	5.28	19	0	1	30.2	33	18	18	8	17
Josh Kinney	0	0	3.24	21	0	0	25.0	17	9	9	8	22
Chris Narveson	0	0	4.82	5	1	0	9.1	6	5	5	5	12
Brian Falkenborg	0	1	2.84	5	0	0	6.1	5	2	2	0	5
Ricardo Rincón	0	0	10.80	5	0	0	3.1	6	4	4	4	6
Team totals	83	78	4.54	161	161	38	1429.2	1475	762	721	504	970

=== First season at the New Busch Stadium ===
The new season brought a Cardinals team that was much changed from the one that went 100-62 in 2005 but fell to the Houston Astros in the NLCS. Starting pitcher Matt Morris, second baseman Mark Grudzielanek, left fielder Reggie Sanders, and relief pitcher Julián Tavárez left the team via free agency. Relief pitcher Ray King was traded to Colorado. Right fielder Larry Walker retired. Brought in to replace the departed Cardinals were right fielder Juan Encarnación, starting pitcher Sidney Ponson, relief pitchers Braden Looper and Ricardo Rincón, all via free agency, and second baseman Aaron Miles, acquired in the Ray King trade. Left field was left unsettled in the offseason and would remain so all year, with no player getting more than one-third of the playing time at that position.

The Cardinals opened the 2006 season on April 3, on the road against the Philadelphia Phillies. St. Louis won 13-5. Albert Pujols homered twice, newly acquired second baseman Aaron Miles had two doubles and a triple, and Scott Rolen, who missed most of the 2005 season with a shoulder injury, had a grand slam.

The Cardinals' home opener was Monday, April 10th. The Cardinals came back from an early deficit to beat Milwaukee 6-4. Pujols had a home run (his fourth in eight games) and Mark Mulder won his first game of the year.

On April 16 against the Cincinnati Reds, Pujols continued his hot start, hitting three home runs, including a walk-off two-run homer in the bottom of the ninth to give the Cardinals an 8-7 victory. The three-dinger day was the second of his career and gave him eight home runs in the Cardinals' first twelve games. St. Louis would continue playing well through April and finished the month with a record of 17-8.

The Cardinals continued to play well in the month of May, but injuries began to accumulate. Relief pitcher Ricardo Rincón, on the disabled list since April 28, had season-ending shoulder surgery on May 12. Ponson went on the disabled list with a strained muscle in his right arm, and ace Chris Carpenter went on the DL with bursitis at the end of the month. Rookie Anthony Reyes got two callups to make emergency starts for Carpenter and Ponson, earning one victory and one no-decision. Jim Edmonds missed time with an abdominal infection and many of the players fell victim to a flu bug in the clubhouse. But Albert Pujols continued his great year, hitting 11 home runs in May after 14 in April, Jason Isringhausen was 10-10 in save opportunities, and the team went 17-11 for the month and finish May with a record of 34-19, fifteen games over .500. On May 28, Mulder, who had been very effective for most of the first two months of the season, was tagged for eight runs in 4.1 innings as the Cardinals lost to San Diego 10-8. It would be a sign of things to come for St. Louis' #2 starter.

=== Summer slump ===
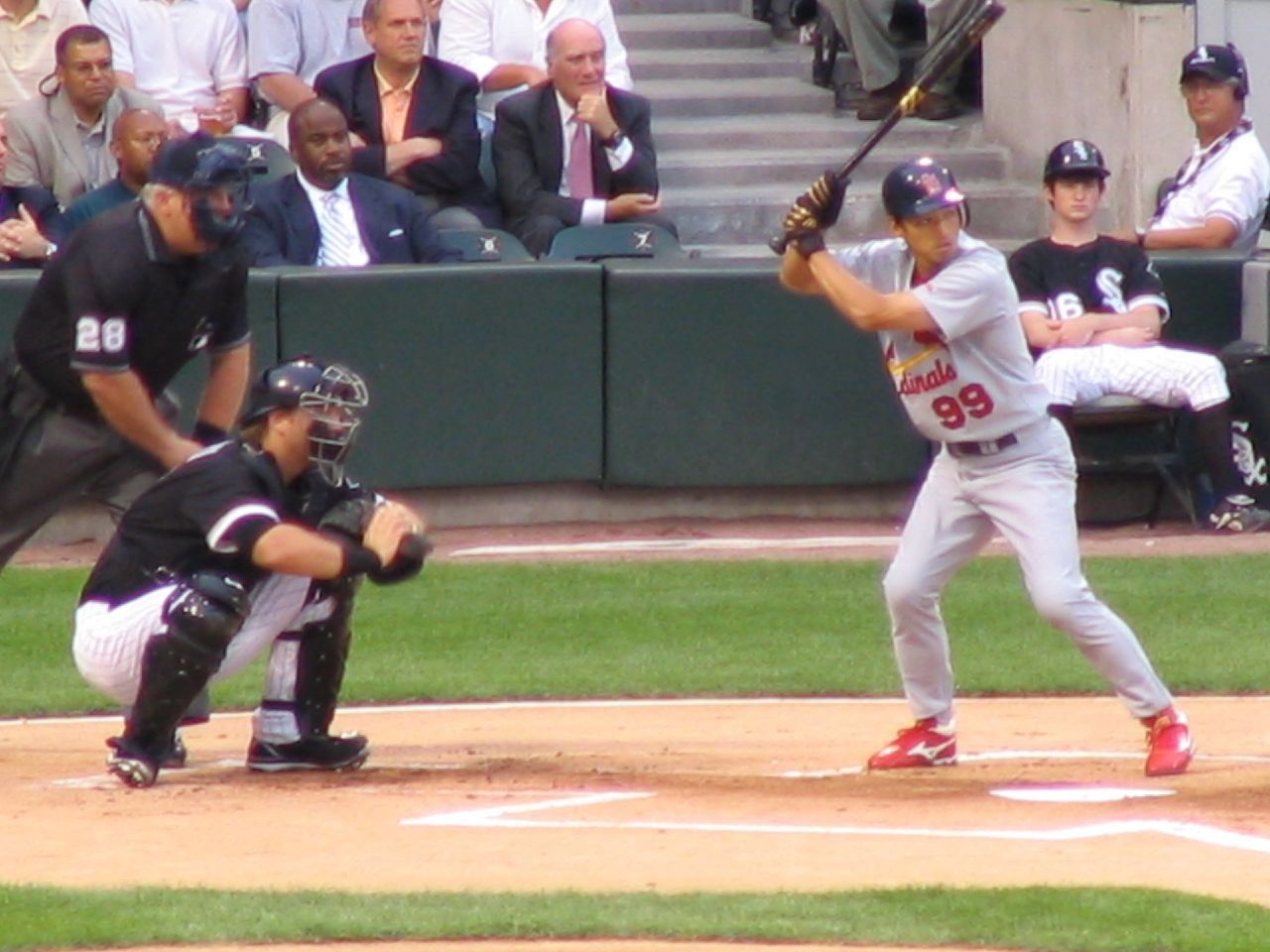
So Taguchi bats against the Chicago White Sox in June 2006

In June the Cardinals began to struggle. On June 4, Albert Pujols went on the disabled list for the first time in his career with a strained right oblique muscle. Two days later, Isringhausen gave up a three-run homer in the ninth inning and the Cardinals lost to Cincinnati 8-7. (Isringhausen blew four saves in June.) Two more losses to the Reds dropped the Cardinals into a brief tie with Cincinnati for first place, but they won seven of their next nine to maintain possession of first place and improve their record to 42-26. The Cardinals were sixteen games over .500, the high-water mark for 2006.

St. Louis then traveled to Chicago for a series against the defending world champion Chicago White Sox. They lost the opener 20-6. Mark Mulder's ERA rose to 6.09, and two days later he went on the disabled list. They lost the second game 13-5, with starting pitcher Jason Marquis giving up all thirteen runs. The next night, rookie Anthony Reyes, called back up to the big leagues with Mulder injured and Ponson banished to the bullpen, threw a one-hitter—but that one hit was a home run by Jim Thome, and the Cardinals lost 1-0. Reyes' gem was also the first game back for Albert Pujols after eighteen days on the disabled list. After the sweep by the White Sox the Cardinals were swept by the Detroit Tigers. Two more losses to the Cleveland Indians extended the streak to eight losses in a row, the longest such streak for a Cardinal team in 18 years. They finally snapped the streak with a 5-4 victory over Cleveland on June 29. For the month, St. Louis went 9-16 and fell to eight games over .500 at 43-35.

July would see much turnover in the roster as the Cardinals struggled to regain their equilibrium. On July 5 Jeff Weaver was acquired from the Los Angeles Angels of Anaheim in a trade, and two days later, Sidney Ponson, previously plagued with injuries and ineffectiveness and demoted to the bullpen, was released. At the end of the month, St. Louis traded Héctor Luna to Cleveland for Ronnie Belliard, who took the second base job that Luna and Miles had shared, and acquired relief pitcher Jorge Sosa from Atlanta for a minor leaguer. Chris Duncan started getting more and more playing time in the outfield and responded with a .324 average for the month. In other developments, Jason Marquis, who gave up thirteen runs in a start against the White Sox in June, gave up twelve runs in a 14-5 disaster against the Atlanta Braves on July 18. Marquis became the first big-league pitcher since Chubby Dean of the 1940 Philadelphia Athletics to cough up twelve runs in a game twice in the same season. On July 19, a storm carrying winds of 80 mph struck the new Busch, knocking over concession stands, ripping the tarp, and injuring thirty people.

The yo-yo season continued. The Cardinals won seven in a row and 13 out of 16 in the middle of July (a surge largely fueled by a sweep of all seven games with the Los Angeles Dodgers in 2006) and by July 26, they had regained their previous high of 16 games over .500, at 58-42. However, the end of the month saw a four-game sweep by the Cubs at Wrigley Field and a losing streak that would extend into August. St. Louis went 15-11 in July and finished the month at 58-46. The Cincinnati Reds continued to dog the Cardinals' footsteps, sitting 3.5 games out of first place at the end of July.

Pitching continued to be problematic for the Cardinals in August. Mark Mulder, attempting to come back from his shoulder injury, made two starts towards the end of the month, got hit very hard both times, and return to the disabled list, where he would stay for the rest of the season. He ended the worst year of his career with a 7.14 ERA. Jason Marquis' miserable year got even worse, with a 6.75 ERA for August. New acquisition Jeff Weaver followed up his 6.46 July with a 5.67 August. Closer Jason Isringhausen also struggled, blowing two saves, taking three losses and posting a 5.06 ERA for the month.

Injuries took their toll on position players as well. Jim Edmonds missed half the month with post-concussion syndrome and David Eckstein went on the disabled list with a strained oblique muscle. The Cardinals signed Preston Wilson, who had been released by Houston, to fill the hole caused by Edmonds' injury.

St. Louis ended July by dropping four in a row and lost four more in a row to start August. After going 18 years without an eight-game losing streak the Redbirds now had their second of the 2006 season. They finally snapped that streak and played somewhat better for the rest of August, as Pujols and Rolen both continued to hit well and Chris Duncan, now playing almost every day, led the team with nine home runs for the month. Backup catcher Gary Bennett had a spectacular weekend at the end of August, homering and hitting a walk-off single to beat the Cubs on the 26th and hitting a walk-off grand slam to beat the Cubs again on the 27th. The Cardinals went 13-15 for the month and ended August with a record of 71-61, still enjoying an NL Central lead of five games over Cincinnati and six games over Houston.

=== September: Photo finish ===
The Cardinals' strange, up/down season would get even stranger in the final month, as the team staggered to the finish while trying to avoid a shocking collapse. As August passed into September, Eckstein was still on the DL and Edmonds was still absent from the lineup with post-concussion syndrome. On September 3, Pujols had his second three-homer game of the season and third of his career, as the Cardinals beat Pittsburgh 6-3. However, two days later the Cardinals were nearly no-hit; Ramón Ortiz of the Washington Nationals took a no-hitter into the ninth before Aaron Miles' single spoiled it. Ortiz settled for a 4-1 victory. Just four days after that on September 9, the Cardinals again almost got no-hit, getting only one Scott Rolen double in a 3-0 loss to the Arizona Diamondbacks.

As the season wound down, St. Louis seemed to run out of gas. Edmonds and Eckstein missed almost the whole month with their injuries. Duncan, who'd made major contributions to a slumping offense in July and August, slumped to a .212 September. Even worse, Scott Rolen, the second-best hitter on the team for five months, went into a terrible slump and hit .227 for the final month. Encarnacion hit .238, Belliard .219, and Molina .224. The only players contributing offense in the final month were Pujols and Scott Spiezio, whose power surge allowed him to post a 1.042 OPS for the last month of the season.

On the pitching mound, Marquis ended his awful year with a dismal 7.25 ERA in September. His 6.02 ERA in 2006 was the worst amongst National League pitchers who qualified for the ERA title. Jason Isringhausen, who had been struggling all summer with a deteriorating hip, was finally lost for the season after blowing his tenth save of the year on September 6 against Washington. Rookie Adam Wainwright assumed the closer's role for the last few weeks of the season.

Despite all these difficulties the Cardinals succeeded in treading water for the first three weeks of the month, and, after a 12-2 victory against Milwaukee on September 19, stood at 80-69 for the season, seven games ahead of Cincinnati and 8 1/2 games ahead of Houston with twelve more games to play. However, the Cardinals proceeded to reel off a seven-game losing streak, their third of the season of seven games or longer. Included in the slide was a four-game sweep by the Astros, who won nine in a row from September 20 through September 28.

On September 27, St. Louis' seven-game lead had been sliced to 1 1/2 games over the hard-charging Astros. Houston won again that day, their eighth in a row. Trailing 2-1 in the bottom of the 8th inning to the San Diego Padres with two on and two out, Albert Pujols hit a three-run homer, his 47th of the year. New closer Wainwright made it stand up, and the losing streak was over. It was Pujols' 25th game-winning hit of the season. However, the next night Jason Marquis had one last terrible start, the Cards lost to Milwaukee 9-4, and the lead over the Astros shrank to 1/2 game. The sports world was rife with memories of the 1964 Philadelphia Phillies, who led by 6 1/2 games with 12 to go and lost ten in a row to lose the pennant to, ironically, the Cardinals.

On September 29, St. Louis beat Milwaukee 10-5 and the Astros lost to Atlanta, snapping their nine-game win streak and widening the lead to 1 1/2 games. On the 30th, Scott Spiezio hit a bases-loaded triple in the bottom of the 8th inning and the Cardinals beat Milwaukee 3-2. Needing only a win in Game 161 against Milwaukee on October 1, St. Louis lost 5-3, but the Astros had already lost 3-1 at Atlanta. The Cardinals had narrowly avoided collapse and won the NL Central with an 83-78 record. Had the Astros won their last game, the Cardinals would have had to play a rained-out make-up game against the San Francisco Giants to determine the tie breaker between the Astros and the Cardinals.

== Postseason ==
=== Division Series ===
The Cardinals entered the postseason with the third-worst record in history for any MLB playoff team, beating only the 2005 Padres (82-80) and the 1973 New York Mets (82-79), and they had just endured a September record of 12–17. Experts gave them little hope of advancing in October. Yet the Cardinals proceeded to beat the NL West champion San Diego Padres in four games in the best-of-five Division Series. Carpenter won two games in the series including the clinching Game 4, Albert Pujols hit .333 with a home run and a double, and Yadier Molina hit .308 (4-13). St. Louis would advance to the NLCS to face the best team in the National League in 2006, the New York Mets.

=== League Championship Series ===
The Cardinals began the NLCS as huge underdogs to the New York Mets. The Mets won fourteen games more than the Cardinals did in 2006. Their offense scored 53 runs more than the Cardinals' did. Their pitchers allowed 31 fewer. In head-to-head contests during the season, the Mets won four of six from St. Louis. Also, by virtue of the better record, the Mets would have home field advantage.

However, the series would be hard-fought by both sides. New York won Game 1 2-0 behind the pitching of ace Tom Glavine and a two-run homer by Carlos Beltrán. The Cardinals won Game 2 9-6 by scoring three runs off Met closer Billy Wagner in the top of the ninth inning, the rally started by a home run from light-hitting (16 career HR in 960 at-bats) So Taguchi. St. Louis won Games 3 and 5 and New York won Games 4 and 6, setting up a winner-take-all Game 7 in New York. Light drizzle fell all game, increasing to a light rain in the later innings. The Mets scored in the bottom of the first on a double by Beltran and a single by Wright, but would not get another hit until the ninth. The Cardinals evened it up at 1-1 in the second on singles by Molina (who followed up his Division Series success by hitting .348 in this series) and Edmonds and a sacrifice bunt by Belliard. There the score would stay for seven innings, thanks in part to Met left fielder Endy Chávez, who made a leaping catch of Scott Rolen's almost-home run in the sixth and doubled Jim Edmonds off of first.

The game was still tied with one out in the top of the ninth when Rolen singled. Molina, batting next, (and like Taguchi not a home run hitter, with 16 in 937 big-league at-bats), hit a two-run homer over the left field wall to give the Cardinals a 3-1 lead. In the bottom of the ninth inning, the Mets loaded the bases with two out on singles by José Valentín and Chavez and a walk to catcher Paul Lo Duca. That brought to the plate Cardinal-killer Carlos Beltrán (18 for 51 with seven home runs against St. Louis in the 2004 and 2006 NLCS), who in the regular season hit 41 home runs and drove in 116 runs. St. Louis' rookie relief pitcher, Adam Wainwright, installed as closer only one month before, struck out Beltran on three pitches (the last a curveball looking), and the Cardinals won the series and the 17th National League pennant in franchise history. Starting pitcher Jeff Suppan was named NLCS MVP.

=== World Series ===
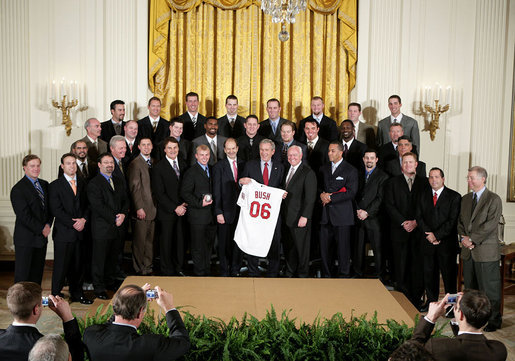
The Cardinals are honored as World Series champions by President Bush at the White House on January 15, 2007.

St. Louis had been an underdog against the Padres, and won. They had been a prohibitive underdog against the Mets, and won. That did not prevent them from being an underdog for the third time against the American League champion Detroit Tigers, who had won 95 games in the regular season, knocked off the New York Yankees in the Division Series and swept the Oakland Athletics in the ALCS. Bob Nightengale of USAToday expressed majority opinion when he said "Tigers in three".

Rookie Anthony Reyes, whose up-and-down season had ended with a 5.06 ERA, retired 17 Detroit hitters in a row in his Game 1 victory, Chris Carpenter threw eight shutout, three-hit innings in Game 3, and Cardinal pitchers overall had a 2.05 ERA for the Series. Scott Rolen hit .421 for the Series, Yadier Molina finished off his superb October by hitting .412, and David Eckstein hit .364 and won the MVP. Detroit, on the other hand, hit .199 and played poorly in the field, with eight errors in five games. St. Louis came back from a 3-0 deficit to win Game 4 5-4 and get within one win of a title. In the deciding Game 5, St. Louis carried a 4-2 lead into the ninth inning. As 46,638 fans looked on, closer Wainwright got Magglio Ordóñez to ground out, gave up a double to Sean Casey, then got Iván Rodríguez to ground out to bring the Cardinals one out away from victory. Plácido Polanco, a former Cardinal, drew a walk, putting the tying run on base. Brandon Inge struck out on three pitches, and the St. Louis Cardinals won their tenth World Series championship in franchise history. David Eckstein won Series MVP and a Chevrolet Corvette Z06.

== Game log ==
Legend
Cardinals Win	Cardinals Loss	Game postponed
Boldface text denotes a Cardinals pitcher

2006 game log
April: 17–8 (.680)

#	Date	Opponent	Score	Win	Loss	Save	Attendance	Record
1	April 3	@ Phillies	13–5	Carpenter	Lieber		44,614	1–0
2	April 5	@ Phillies	4–3	Thompson	Gordon	Isringhausen	20,557	2–0
3	April 6	@ Phillies	4–2	Marquis	Lidle	Isringhausen	20,413	3–0
4	April 7	@ Cubs	1–5	Maddux	Suppan		40,869	3–1
5	April 8	@ Cubs	2–3	Howry	Thompson	Dempster	40,182	3–2
6	April 9	@ Cubs	4–8	Williamson	Isringhausen		39,839	3–3
7	April 10	Brewers	6–4	Mulder	Ohka	Isringhausen	41,936	4–3
8	April 12	Brewers	8–3	Marquis	Bush		40,648	5–3
9	April 13	Brewers	3–4 (11)	de la Rosa	Isringhausen	Turnbow	40,222	5–4
10	April 14	Reds	0–1	Harang	Carpenter	Weathers	40,901	5–5
11	April 15	Reds	9–3	Ponson	Williams		40,752	6–5
12	April 16	Reds	8–7	Looper	Weathers		40,068	7–5
13	April 17	@ Pirates	2–1	Marquis	Maholm	Isringhausen	15,278	8–5
14	April 18	@ Pirates	4–12	Ol. Perez	Suppan		16,682	8–6
15	April 19	@ Pirates	4–0	Carpenter	Santos		15,085	9–6
16	April 21	Cubs	9–3	Mulder	Williams		41,379	10–6
17	April 22	Cubs	4–1	Ponson	Rusch	Isringhausen	41,424	11–6
18	April 23	Cubs	3–7	Maddux	Marquis		41,373	11–7
19	April 24	Pirates	7–2	Carpenter	Ol. Perez		38,953	12–7
20	April 25	Pirates	6–3	Suppan	Santos	Isringhausen	38,809	13–7
21	April 26	Pirates	4–3	Isringhausen	R. Hernandez		38,728	14–7
22	April 27	Nationals	6–2	Ponson	O'Connor		39,515	15–7
23	April 28	Nationals	3–8	Armas	Marquis		40,841	15–8
24	April 29	Nationals	2–1	Looper	Rauch	Isringhausen	39,596	16–8
25	April 30	Nationals	9–2	Suppan	Day		39,383	17–8

May: 17–11 (.607)

#	Date	Opponent	Score	Win	Loss	Save	Attendance	Record
26	May 1	@ Reds	1–6	Arroyo	Mulder		20,900	17–9
27	May 2	@ Reds	2–3	Coffey	Falkenborg		25,127	17–10
28	May 3	@ Astros	4–5	Oswalt	Marquis	Lidge	37,305	17–11
29	May 4	@ Astros	3–4	Pettitte	Carpenter	Lidge	37,290	17–12
30	May 5	@ Marlins	7–2	Suppan	Mitre		13,266	18–12
31	May 6	@ Marlins	7–6	Mulder	Willis	Isringhausen	14,369	19–12
32	May 7	@ Marlins	9–1	Hancock	Olsen		13,057	20–12
33	May 8	Rockies	2–6	Francis	Marquis	Fuentes	39,007	20–13
34	May 9	Rockies	4–2	Wainwright	Mesa	Isringhausen	40,375	21–13
35	May 10	Rockies	7–4	Suppan	B. Kim	Isringhausen	39,108	22–13
36	May 12	Diamondbacks	5–3	Mulder	Cruz	Isringhausen	41,085	23–13
37	May 13	Diamondbacks	9–1	Marquis	Vargas		40,585	24–13
38	May 14	Diamondbacks	6–7	Vizcaino	Wainwright	Valverde	40,891	24–14
39	May 16	Mets	3–8	Glavine	Suppan		39,616	24–15
40	May 17	Mets	1–0	Mulder	Trachsel	Isringhausen	40,573	25–15
41	May 18	Mets	6–3	Marquis	Lima	Isringhausen	40,573	26–15
42	May 19	@ Royals	9–6	Carpenter	Redman	Wainwright	33,045	27–15
43	May 20	@ Royals	4–2	Reyes	Bautista	Isringhausen	40,516	28–15
44	May 21	@ Royals	10–3	Suppan	Elarton		30,266	29–15
45	May 22	@ Giants	2–9	Wright	Mulder		38,133	29–16
46	May 23	@ Giants	8–5	Marquis	Morris	Isringhausen	37,986	30–16
47	May 24	@ Giants	10–4	Wainwright	Lowry		37,752	31–16
48	May 26	@ Padres	1–7	Hensley	Suppan		40,075	31–17
49	May 27	@ Padres	4–3	Ponson	Park	Isringhausen	32,722	32–17
50	May 28	@ Padres	8–10	Peavy	Mulder	Hoffman	38,145	32–18
51	May 29	Astros	3–1	Marquis	Miller	Isringhausen	45,509	33–18
52	May 30	Astros	3–6	Pettitte	Hancock	Lidge	44,732	33–19
53	May 31	Astros	4–3 (11)	Looper	Gallo		43,534	34–19

June: 9–16 (.360)

#	Date	Opponent	Score	Win	Loss	Save	Attendance	Record
54	June 2	Cubs	4–5 (14)	Dempster	Hancock		45,799	34–20
55	June 3	Cubs	5–8	Rusch	Mulder	Howry	45,820	34–21
56	June 4	Cubs	9–6	Marquis	Maddux	Isringhausen	45,753	35–21
57	June 5	Reds	7–8	Yan	Isringhausen	Coffey	43,707	35–22
58	June 6	Reds	0–7	Milton	Carpenter		43,857	35–23
59	June 7	Reds	4–7	Harang	Ponson	Coffey	44,306	35–24
60	June 9	@ Brewers	10–6	Hancock	Winkelsas	Isringhausen	24,490	36–24
61	June 10	@ Brewers	3–4	Wise	Flores	Turnbow	36,981	36–25
62	June 11	@ Brewers	7–5	Hancock	Bush	Isringhausen	29,122	37–25
63	June 13	@ Pirates	2–1	Carpenter	Ol. Perez	Isringhausen	24,443	38–25
64	June 14	@ Pirates	7–9	Duke	Ponson	Gonzalez	20,289	38–26
65	June 15	@ Pirates	6–5	Mulder	Santos	Isringhausen	18,248	39–26
66	June 16	Rockies	8–1	Marquis	Cook		45,736	40–26
67	June 17	Rockies	6–5	Suppan	Francis	Isringhausen	45,968	41–26
68	June 18	Rockies	4–1	Carpenter	Fogg	Isringhausen	45,647	42–26
69	June 20	@ White Sox	6–20	Vazquez	Mulder		39,463	42–27
70	June 21	@ White Sox	5–13	Buehrle	Marqus		37,897	42–28
71	June 22	@ White Sox	0–1	Garcia	Reyes	Jenks	39,509	42–29
72	June 23	@ Tigers	6–10	Verlander	Carpenter		42,238	42–30
73	June 24	@ Tigers	6–7 (10)	Zumaya	Johnson		42,535	42–31
74	June 25	@ Tigers	1–4	Ledezma	Ponson	Jones	40,644	42–32
75	June 26	Indians	3–10	Lee	Marquis		44,659	42–33
76	June 27	Indians	1–3	Sabathia	Reyes	Wickman	44,446	42–34
77	June 28	Indians	5–4	Isringhausen	Wickman		44,628	43–34
78	June 30	Royals	5–7 (10)	Burgos	Looper		45,884	43–35

July: 15–11 (.577)

#	Date	Opponent	Score	Win	Loss	Save	Attendance	Record
79	July 1	Royals	7–8 (11)	Hudson	Isringhausen		45,035	43–36
80	July 2	Royals	9–7	Marquis	Wood		45,400	44–36
81	July 3	@ Braves	3–6	Smoltz	Reyes	Sosa	40,011	44–37
82	July 4	@ Braves	6–3	Carpenter	Thomson	Isringhausen	47,514	45–37
83	July 5	@ Braves	4–14	James	Suppan		28,705	45–38
84	July 6	@ Astros	2–4	Buchholz	Ponson	Lidge	41,528	45–39
85	July 7	@ Astros	8–2	Marquis	Rodriguez	Isringhausen	43,236	46–39
86	July 8	@ Astros	7–6 (10)	Isringhausen	Oswalt		43,424	47–39
87	July 9	@ Astros	7–5 (12)	Looper	Lidge	Hancock	41,652	48–39
88	July 13	Dodgers	3–2 (14)	Looper	Perez		45,156	49–39
89	July 14	Dodgers	5–0	Carpenter	Lowe		45,704	50–39
90	July 15	Dodgers	2–1 (10)	Looper	Baez		46,068	51–39
91	July 16	Dodgers	11–3	Reyes	Penny		44,741	52–39
92	July 17	Braves	3–15	Ramirez	Weaver		44,507	52–40
93	July 18	Braves	5–14	Hudson	Marquis		44,718	52–41
94	July 19	Braves	8–3	Carpenter	Shiell		43,991	53–41
95	July 21	@ Dodgers	2–0	Suppan	Penny	Isringhausen	47,987	54–41
96	July 22	@ Dodgers	6–1	Weaver	Sele		50,438	55–41
97	July 23	@ Dodgers	6–1	Marquis	Billingsley		43,650	56–41
98	July 24	@ Rockies	0–7	Francis	Reyes		28,830	56–42
99	July 25	@ Rockies	1–0	Carpenter	Jennings	Isringhausen	31,673	57–42
100	July 26	@ Rockies	6–1	Suppan	Cook		32,872	58–42
101	July 27	@ Cubs	4–5	Novoa	Johnson	Dempster	40,346	58–43
102	July 28	@ Cubs	5–6	Marmol	Marquis	Dempster	40,420	58–44
103	July 29	@ Cubs	2–4	Maddux	Reyes	Dempster	41,302	58–45
104	July 30	@ Cubs	3–6	Zambrano	Carpenter		40,033	58–46

August: 13–14 (.481)

#	Date	Opponent	Score	Win	Loss	Save	Attendance	Record
105	August 1	Phillies	3–5	Mathieson	Suppan	Gordon	42773	58–47
106	August 2	Phillies	8–16	Myers	Weaver		42,598	58–48
107	August 3	Phillies	1–8	Hamels	Marquis		42,461	58–49
108	August 4	Brewers	3–4	Davis	Carpenter	Cordero	43,162	58–50
109	August 5	Brewers	4–3	Reyes	Sheets	Isringhausen	43,299	59–50
110	August 6	Brewers	7–1	Suppan	Capuano	Sosa	43,140	60–50
111	August 7	@ Reds	13–1	Weaver	Ramirez		34,262	61–50
112	August 8	@ Reds	3–10	Milton	Marquis		40,094	61–51
113	August 9	@ Reds	7–8	Franklin	Isringhausen		41,649	61–52
114	August 10	@ Reds	6–1	Reyes	Arroyo		39,591	62–52
115	August 11	@ Pirates	1–7	Duke	Suppan		30,516	62–53
116	August 12	@ Pirates	2–3	Snell	Weaver	Gonzalez	35,037	62–54
117	August 13	@ Pirates	0–7	Maholm	Marquis		27,101	62–55
118	August 15	Reds	5–0	Carpenter	Harang		42,761	63–55
119	August 16	Reds	2–7	Arroyo	Reyes		42,752	63–56
120	August 17	Reds	2–1	Isringhausen	Franklin		40,346	64–56
121	August 18	@ Cubs	11–3	Marquis	Marmol		40,346	65–56
122	August 19	@ Cubs	4–5 (10)	Wuertz	Isringhausen		40,864	65–57
123	August 20	@ Cubs	5–3	Carpenter	Mateo	Isringhausen	40,485	66–57
124	August 22	@ Mets	7–8	Heilman	Isringhausen		49,661	66–58
125	August 23	@ Mets	8–10	Trachsel	Mulder	Wagner	49,329	66–59
126	August 24	@ Mets	2–6	Williams	Marquis		45,497	66–60
127	August 25	Cubs	2–0	Suppan	Mateo	Isringhausen	46,004	67–60
128	August 26	Cubs	2–1	Flores	Novoa		46,036	68–60
129	August 27	Cubs	10–6	Looper	Howry		44,937	69–60
130	August 29	Marlins	1–9	Olsen	Mulder		40,663	69–61
131	August 30	Marlins	13–6	Marquis	Nolasco		41,322	70–61
132	August 31	Marlins	5–2	Looper	Mitre	Isringhausen	40,989	71–61

September: 12–16 (.429)

#	Date	Opponent	Score	Win	Loss	Save	Attendance	Record
133	September 1	Pirates	3–1	Carpenter	Duke		42,091	72–61
134	September 2	Pirates	0–1	Capps	Weaver	Torres	41,466	72–62
135	September 3	Pirates	6–3	Reyes	Snell		42,205	73–62
136	September 4	@ Nationals	1–4	Ortiz	Marquis		31,092	73–63
137	September 5	@ Nationals	2–0	Suppan	Astacio	Isringhausen	25,937	74–63
138	September 6	@ Nationals	6–7	Cordero	Isringhausen		21,322	74–64
139	September 7	@ Diamondbacks	6–2	Weaver	Batista		29,998	75–64
140	September 8	@ Diamondbacks	1–13	L. Hernandez	Reyes		25,229	75–65
141	September 9	@ Diamondbacks	0–3	Webb	Marquis		33,619	75–66
142	September 10	@ Diamondbacks	7–9	Vizcaino	Sosa	Valverde	25,381	75–67
143	September 11	Astros	7–0	Carpenter	Buchholz		41,061	76–67
144	September 12	Astros	6–5	Looper	Lidge		41,453	77–67
145	September 13	Astros	1–5	Oswalt	Marquis	Wheeler	40,459	77–68
146	September 15	Giants	14–4	Suppan	Hennessey		45,927	78–68
147	September 16	Giants	6–1	Carpenter	Morris		45,445	79–68
–	September 17	Giants	Cancelled					79–68
148	September 18	@ Brewers	3–4	Cordero	Looper		19,360	79–69
149	September 19	@ Brewers	12–2	Weaver	Sheets		15,204	80–69
150	September 20	@ Brewers	0–1	Cordero	Johnson		14,242	80–70
151	September 21	@ Astros	5–6	Borkowski	Carpenter	Wheeler	32,975	80–71
152	September 22	@ Astros	5–6	Qualls	Looper		39,616	80–72
153	September 23	@ Astros	4–7	Wheeler	Johnson		43,469	80–73
154	September 24	@ Astros	3–7	Qualls	Hancock		43,704	80–74
155	September 25	Padres	5–6	Cassidy	Thompson	Linebrink	40,149	80–75
156	September 26	Padres	5–7	Williams	Carpenter	Hoffman	40,443	80–76
157	September 27	Padres	4–2	Johnson	Linebrink	Wainwright	40,358	81–76
158	September 28	Brewers	4–9	Davis	Marquis		40,313	81–77
159	September 29	Brewers	10–5	Weaver	Capuano		41,718	82–77
160	September 30	Brewers	3–2	Johnson	Shouse	Wainwright	44,294	83–77

October: 0–1 (.000)

#	Date	Opponent	Score	Win	Loss	Save	Attendance	Record
161	October 1	Brewers	3–5	Villanueva	Reyes		44,133	83–78

== Farm system ==
Level	Team	League	Manager
AAA	Memphis Redbirds	Pacific Coast League	Danny Sheaffer
AA	Springfield Cardinals	Texas League	Chris Maloney
A	Palm Beach Cardinals	Florida State League	Ron Warner
A	Quad Cities Swing	Midwest League	Keith Mitchell
A-Short Season	New Jersey Cardinals	New York–Penn League	Mark DeJohn
Rookie	Johnson City Cardinals	Appalachian League	Dan Radison
