= Colina =

Colina (which means "hill" in Spanish and Portuguese) may refer to:

== Places ==
- Colina, São Paulo, Brazil
- Colina, Chile
- Colina (Madrid), a ward in Madrid, Spain
- Colina, a village in Murighiol Commune, Tulcea County, Romania

== People ==
- Alejandro Colina (1901–1976), Venezuelan sculptor
- Alvin Colina (born 1981), Venezuelan baseball player
- Josip Colina (born 1980), Bosnian-Swiss footballer
- Braulio Carrillo Colina (1800–1845), Costa Rican head of state in the 19th century
- Mirco Colina (born 1990), Curaçaoan footballer
- Samara Colina (1992–20266), Mexican artist
- Simón Colina (born 1995), Spanish footballer

== Other uses ==
- Colina (gastropod), a genus of sea snails
- Grupo Colina, Peruvian paramilitary death squad
- Comando de Libertação Nacional (Colina, English: National Liberation Command,), defunct Brazilian leftist group

== See also ==
- Collina (disambiguation)
