= 2006 Arizona Diamondbacks season =

2006 Arizona Diamondbacks
- League: National League
- Division: West
- Ballpark: Chase Field
- City: Phoenix, Arizona
- Record: 76-86 (.469)
- Divisional place: 4th
- Owners: Ken Kendrick; Jeff Moorad
- General managers: Josh Byrnes
- Managers: Bob Melvin
- Television: FSN Arizona; KTVK (3TV) (Thom Brennaman, Greg Schulte, Matt Williams, Tom Candiotti, Mark Grace, Joe Garagiola)
- Radio: KTAR (620 AM) (Thom Brennaman, Greg Schulte, Matt Williams, Tom Candiotti, Mark Grace, Joe Garagiola, Jeff Munn); KSUN (Spanish)
- Stats: ESPN.com; Baseball Reference

The 2006 Arizona Diamondbacks season was the franchise's 9th season in Major League Baseball and their 9th season at Chase Field in Phoenix, Arizona, as members of the National League West.

They looked to improve on their 77-85 record from 2005. They looked to contend in what was once again a weak National League West. They finished the season with a record of 76-86, a fourth place tie with the Colorado Rockies in the division.

This was also their last season wearing purple and teal primary uniforms as they made the switch to Sedona red and black in November 2006. Teal would return as a permanent color in 2024.

== Offseason ==
During the 2005 off-season, the Diamondbacks made several key moves to bolster a disappointing pitching staff and improve the team defensively. Highly regarded pitching coach Bryan Price (who was already a resident of nearby Scottsdale) was hired not long after he resigned from the Seattle Mariners after 19 years with that organization, the last six as pitching coach; he served with Diamondbacks manager Bob Melvin when he was manager at Seattle in 2003 and 2004.

Key player acquisitions included catcher Johnny Estrada; right-handed pitchers Orlando "El Duque" Hernández and Luis Vizcaíno; outfielder Chris Young; second baseman Orlando Hudson(a Gold Glove Award recipient in 2005 with the Toronto Blue Jays), for whom Troy Glaus was traded; right-handed pitcher Miguel Batista (previously a member of the Diamondbacks from 2001–2003, including the 2001 World Series team); free-agent outfielder Eric Byrnes and veteran free agent pitcher Terry Mulholland (who would go on to spend two separate stints on the disabled list and get released in late June).

On December 8, 2005, future all-star Dan Uggla was drafted by the Florida Marlins from the Arizona Diamondbacks in the 2005 minor league draft. In January, the Diamondbacks signed highly touted 18-year-old shortstop Justin Upton, the No. 1 overall pick in the 2005 First-Year Player Draft, to a $6.1 million contract that included a trip to spring training as a non-roster invitee. Upton began the regular season at Class A South Bend.

The D-Backs posted a respectable 18-14 record for the 2006 Cactus League spring training campaign.

== Regular season ==
=== Season standings ===
==== National League West ====
NL West
Team	W	L	Pct.	GB	Home	Road
San Diego Padres	88	74	.543	—	43‍–‍38	45‍–‍36
Los Angeles Dodgers	88	74	.543	—	49‍–‍32	39‍–‍42
San Francisco Giants	76	85	.472	11½	43‍–‍38	33‍–‍47
Arizona Diamondbacks	76	86	.469	12	39‍–‍42	37‍–‍44
Colorado Rockies	76	86	.469	12	44‍–‍37	32‍–‍49

==== Record vs. opponents ====
2006 National League record Source: MLB Standings Grid – 2006
Team	AZ	ATL	CHC	CIN	COL	FLA	HOU	LAD	MIL	NYM	PHI	PIT	SD	SF	STL	WAS	AL
Arizona	—	6–1	4–2	4–2	12–7	2–4	4–5	8–10	3–3	1–6	1–5	5–1	9–10	8–11	4–3	1–5	4–11
Atlanta	1–6	—	6–1	4–3	3–3	11–8	3–4	3–3	2–4	7–11	7–11	3–3	7–2	3–4	4–2	10–8	5–10
Chicago	2–4	1–6	—	10–9	2–4	2–4	7–8	4–2	8–8	3–3	2–5	6–9	0–7	2–4	11–8	2–4	4–11
Cincinnati	2–4	3–4	9–10	—	5–1	4–2	10–5	0–6	9–10	3–4	2–4	9–7	2–4	2–5	9–6	5–1	6-9
Colorado	7–12	3–3	4–2	1–5	—	3–3	4–2	4–15	2–4	1–5	3–4	3–3	10–9	10–8	2–7	8–0	11–4
Florida	4–2	8–11	4–2	2–4	3–3	—	3–4	1–5	7–0	8–11	6–13	5–2	3–3	3–3	1–5	11–7	9–9
Houston	5–4	4–3	8–7	5–10	2–4	4-3	—	3–3	10–5	2–4	2–4	13–3	3–3	1–5	9–7	4–4	7–11
Los Angeles	10–8	3–3	2–4	6–0	15–4	5–1	3–3	—	4–2	3–4	4–3	6–4	5–13	13–6	0–7	4–2	5–10
Milwaukee	3–3	4–2	8–8	10–9	4–2	0–7	5–10	2–4	—	3–3	5–1	7–9	4–3	6–3	7–9	1–5	6–9
New York	6–1	11–7	3–3	4–3	5–1	11–8	4–2	4–3	3–3	—	11–8	5–4	5–2	3–3	4–2	12–6	6–9
Philadelphia	5-1	11–7	5–2	4–2	4–3	13–6	4–2	3–4	1–5	8–11	—	3–3	2–4	5–1	3–3	9–10	5–13
Pittsburgh	1–5	3–3	9–6	7–9	3–3	2–5	3–13	4–6	9–7	4–5	3–3	—	1–5	6–1	6–9	3–3	3–12
San Diego	10–9	2–7	7–0	4–2	9–10	3–3	3–3	13–5	3–4	2–5	4–2	5–1	—	7–12	4–2	5–1	7–8
San Francisco	11–8	4–3	4–2	5–2	8–10	3–3	5–1	6–13	3–6	3–3	1–5	1–6	12–7	—	1–4	1–5	8–7
St. Louis	3–4	2–4	8–11	6–9	7–2	5-1	7–9	7–0	9–7	2–4	3–3	9–6	2–4	4–1	—	4–3	5–10
Washington	5–1	8–10	4–2	1–5	0–8	7-11	4–4	2–4	5–1	6–12	10–9	3–3	1–5	5–1	3–4	—	7–11

=== April–May ===
On April 18, LF Luis Gonzalez hit his 500th career double to become just the 21st player in Major League Baseball history to hit 300 home runs and 500 doubles; on May 13 he passed Babe Ruth for 38th place all-time for the most doubles hit in league history. "Gonzo", as he is called by his fans, became the number one fan favorite in Phoenix in the years since hitting the winning RBI in the 2001 World Series (which capped his 57 regular season HR's, still a team record).

Frustrated by not having a set spot in the rotation, Hernandez was traded to the New York Mets in exchange for reliever Jorge Julio on May 24. While on the Diamondbacks he posted a 2-4 record with a 6.11 ERA.

The team was in first place through the month of May, and they started the month of June with a 4-game sweep of the Atlanta Braves at Turner Field – then posted an astonishingly terrible 4 wins and 20 losses the rest of the month. The GrimsleyGate scandal (see below) may have been one factor in the "June swoon".

=== Jason Grimsley scandal ===
Based on several media reports that appeared on June 7, reliever Jason Grimsley admitted to taking illegal performance-enhancing drugs, specifically human growth hormone, as part of the IRS probe of BALCO, best known for similar allegations concerning San Francisco Giants star Barry Bonds. IRS agents apparently made an extensive search of Grimsley's Scottsdale, Arizona residence seeking evidence.

Grimsley and team officials declined comment before the June 6 home game vs. the Philadelphia Phillies. Grimsley was released from the Diamondbacks on June 7 on his request, and his locker cleaned out.

It was later announced by Grimsley's agent, Joe Bick, that Grimsley decided to retire from the game of baseball, and that it was his understanding that the remainder of his $825,000 salary would be paid.

During the Diamondbacks home game on June 10, managing general partner Ken Kendrick told reporters that the Diamondbacks had no intention of paying Grimsley his salary and that the club would file termination papers on Grimsley with MLB on June 12 to that effect; this prompted Bick to announce that he would be filing a grievance on Grimsley's behalf with the Major League Baseball Players Association.

On June 12, the Commissioner's office announced that it would suspend Grimsley for 50 games for violating baseball's Joint Drug Prevention and Treatment Program, effective if Grimsley chooses to come out of retirement. Michael Weiner, general counsel to the MLBPA, stated that the union would file a grievance on his behalf.

Grimsley and the Diamondbacks reached a final settlement on the salary payout in August. Grimsley requested that the remainder of the salary funds be donated to charities designated by Grimsley.

=== June–July ===
It appeared that the controversy surrounding Grimsley, popular and well liked with the other team members, possibly affected the team play of the Diamondbacks, leading to a "June Swoon." The Diamondbacks returned from a 10-game East Coast road trip in which they won 7 and lost 3 (including the above-mentioned 4-game sweep of the Braves) and found themselves 2½ games in front of the Los Angeles Dodgers by June 5. However, the team entered a freefall immediately following the Grimsley scandal, starting with a lengthy homestand in which they did not won a single contest until their June 13 home win against the Giants. The final Diamondbacks record in June was 4 wins and 20 losses.

Reliever José Valverde, the closer coming out of spring training (he was also in that role at the end of the 2005 season), was effective in April and most of May getting 12 saves and keeping the opposition to four runs in his first 16 appearances; in late May and June Valverde faltered to the point where his closer's job was given to newly acquired Jorge Julio; Valverde struggled for much of June, allowing 15 runs in nine appearances, and his ERA was 7.12 as of June 29. He was optioned to the Diamondbacks' AAA affiliate, the Tucson Sidewinders, on July 3. The bullpen in general, while showing brilliance early on, struggled somewhat as a whole in June, although Julio ended the month with his seventh save in eight chances.

Luis Gonzalez struggled somewhat offensively before the All Star break; it wasn't until June 27 against the Seattle Mariners that "Gonzo" hit his first home run since April 20.

According to reports on Diamondbacks flagship radio station KTAR and in the Arizona Republic, RHP Russ Ortiz, who had a highly disappointing tenure with the D-Backs after signing a $33 million contract during the 2004 offseason, was designated for assignment (DFA) on June 13. He was signed by the Baltimore Orioles on June 25.

(Ortiz struggled with the Orioles during the remainder of the 2006 season, losing his role as a starter with that organization, but after regaining his form somewhat in winter ball in Puerto Rico, Ortiz was signed by the San Francisco Giants in January 2007 and after a good spring training campaign, was eventually named the Giants' fifth starter for the 2007 season. Ortiz has slightly more than $22 million left on his contract which the Diamondback organization is paying as of the 2007 season.)

Ortiz, previously with the Giants and Braves, was 0-5 with a 7.54 ERA in six starts for the Diamondbacks in 2006, and was 5-11 with a 6.89 ERA in 2005.

As the second half of the season approached, fans writing on various Diamondback fan blogs expressed opinions ranging from frustration with the players and coaching staff (especially Melvin, who is seen by many fans as having too casual and relaxed of an attitude to properly motivate the players) for what they see as the squandering of a potential NL West Championship season, to frustration with fellow fans for not being patient and allowing a highly talented current core of younger players, including Stephen Drew, Carlos Quentin, Micah Owings and Scott Hairston, to develop in the minor league farm system and contribute to the D-Backs success in later years (and possibly as soon as this season).

On July 9, the Diamondbacks announced an agreement with manager Melvin on a two-year contract extension with an option for the 2009 season.

On July 15, shortstop Stephen Drew was called up from the Sidewinders to replace Craig Counsell, who broke a rib during an at-bat on July 14. Drew got his first major league hit on July 17 against the Los Angeles Dodgers, for which his brother J. D. Drew plays. Both Drew's parents were in attendance.

On July 20, the Diamondbacks promoted highly touted outfielder Carlos Quentin from Tucson. Quentin was Arizona's second pick in the first round of the 2003 draft. He played college baseball for Stanford University, where he was an outstanding hitter and helped lead Stanford to two College World Series appearances. Quentin was hitting .289 with 30 doubles, three triples, nine homers and 52 RBIs in 85 games for the Sidewinders. To make room for Quentin, the Diamondbacks optioned right-handed pitcher Edgar Gonzalez to Tucson. After grounding out in his first two at-bats, Quentin hit a two-run home run off Hendrickson in the sixth inning. He went 1-for-4 in the D-Backs' 5-2 win over the Dodgers.

That day, manager Bob Melvin told veteran OF Luis Gonzalez he was going to start Quentin in left field to give Gonzalez a night off against a tough left-handed pitcher (Mark Hendrickson of the Los Angeles Dodgers).

Gonzalez reportedly interpreted his benching in a negative manner; he took it as a sign the organization may be ready to part company with him at year's end. There has been speculation the club will not pick up its $10 million option on Gonzalez for 2007. "Gonzo", long a fan favorite for the D-Backs, was vocal to the media about his displeasure with the decision, angering many fans.

Gonzalez would later distance himself from those comments and slightly improve his batting average, and continued to move up the all time doubles list. On July 29 he obtained his 1,300th career RBI with a third-inning single against pitcher Brandon Backe of the Houston Astros.

=== August–September ===
On August 7, the D-Backs acquired RHP Liván Hernández from the Washington Nationals in exchange for minor league pitching prospects Garrett Mock and Matt Chico. Hernandez was 9-8 this season as of August 7, with a 5.34 ERA in 24 starts. The Diamondbacks flirted with trading for a pitcher before the July 31 trade deadline but made no moves at that time; after All-Star Brandon Webb (the ace of the Diamondback pitching staff and widely considered a candidate for the NL Cy Young Award) missed his scheduled August 5 start against Houston with a sore elbow, it became more urgent to add a starter to the rotation.

Hernandez finished the 2006 campaign with a final record of 13-13, with an ERA of 4.83, 128 strikeouts and 78 walks surrendered.

Veteran outfielder Shawn Green was traded from the Diamondbacks to the New York Mets for Evan MacLane on August 22. The D-Backs sent the 33-year-old Green and slightly more than $6.3 million to the Mets for AAA LHP pitching prospect Evan MacLane. Green is owed about $13.25 million for the remainder of his contract. Carlos Quentin became the everyday starting right fielder as a result of Green's departure.

On September 14, it was announced that the Diamondbacks would not pick up the 2007 option on Luis Gonzalez's contract, meaning that he would not be back with the club in 2007. This was disclosed to Gonzalez in a meeting with general manager Josh Byrnes and general partner Jeff Moorad, who served as Gonzalez's agent before becoming part of the Diamondbacks ownership group (Moorad actually negotiated Gonzalez's current contract with then-managing general partner and franchise founder Jerry Colangelo). The executives left open the possibility of Gonzalez returning to the franchise after his retirement, as a coach, broadcaster, or front office executive.

Gonzalez played his final game as a Diamondback on the final day of the season (October 1). He was greeted with standing ovations from the fans, many of whom disapproved of Gonzo's not being part of the future plans of the ballclub (paid attendance was 48,946, the largest regular-season crowd in franchise history). Colangelo and founding GM Joe Garagiola, Jr., who made the trade to bring Gonzalez to the Diamondbacks in 1998, were in attendance.

Gonzalez ended his Arizona Diamondbacks career with 547 total career doubles, good for 20th place on the all-time MLB career list. He leaves the Diamondbacks as the franchise leader in home runs (224) and RBIs (774).

Infielder Craig Counsell was also honored, as he was seen as not returning to the team for 2007 due to the emergence of Stephen Drew and the Baby Backs.

Despite strong late-season performances from José Valverde, who returned to the closer role in early September as a much improved relief pitcher, finishing the season with 18 saves, as well as other called-up Baby Backs including CF Chris Young and infielder Alberto Callaspo, the Diamondbacks lost 18 games in the month of August, including being swept in three games at San Francisco. They were at that point, for all intents and purposes, knocked out of the NL West pennant race and the NL Wild Card race. On September 24, the Diamondbacks were mathematically eliminated from postseason contention with a 5-1 loss at Los Angeles. The final game of the 2006 season was a 7-6 loss to the San Diego Padres at Chase Field (which gave the Padres the 2006 NL West Division championship) and featured a rare poor performance by ace starting pitcher Brandon Webb. The Diamondbacks finished the year with 76 wins and 86 losses for a .469 winning percentage. They tied for 4th place in the NL West with the Colorado Rockies, 12 games behind the Padres.

=== Roster ===
2006 Arizona Diamondbacks
Roster
Pitchers: 41 Greg Aquino; 59 Jeff Bajenaru; 43 Miguel Batista; 21 Randy Choate; 37 Juan Cruz; 55 Casey Daigle; 31 Édgar González; 49 Enrique González; 54 Jason Grimsley; 61 Liván Hernández; 26 Orlando Hernández; 32 Kevin Jarvis; 50 Jorge Julio; 58 Mike Koplove; 38 Brandon Lyon; 28 Brandon Medders; 45 Terry Mulholland; 57 Dustin Nippert; 48 Russ Ortiz; 56 Tony Peña; 45 Doug Slaten; 47 José Valverde; 29 Claudio Vargas; 52 Luis Vizcaíno; 17 Brandon Webb	Catchers: 23 Johnny Estrada; 26 Miguel Montero; 19 Chris Snyder; Infielders: 44 Alberto Callaspo; 34 Tony Clark; 4 Craig Counsell; 6 Stephen Drew; 10 Andy Green; 1 Orlando Hudson; 16 Conor Jackson; 18 Chad Tracy	Outfielders: 22 Eric Byrnes; 30 Jeff DaVanon; 2 Damion Easley; 20 Luis Gonzalez; 15 Shawn Green; 9 Scott Hairston; 7 Carlos Quentin; 24 Chris Young	Manager: 3 Bob Melvin; Coaches: 8 Mike Aldrete (hitting); 33 Jay Bell (bench); 35 Bryan Price (pitching); 53 Glenn Sherlock (bullpen); 8 Lee Tinsley (first base); 14 Carlos Tosca (third base)

== Player stats ==
=== Batting ===
==== Starters by position ====
Note: Pos = Position; G = Games played; AB = At bats; H = Hits; Avg. = Batting average; HR = Home runs; RBI = Runs batted in

Pos	Player	G	AB	H	Avg.	HR	RBI
C	Johnny Estrada	115	414	125	.302	11	71
1B	Conor Jackson	140	485	141	.291	15	79
2B	Orlando Hudson	157	579	166	.287	15	67
SS	Craig Counsell	105	372	95	.255	4	30
3B	Chad Tracy	154	597	168	.281	20	80
LF	Luis Gonzalez	153	586	159	.271	15	73
CF	Eric Byrnes	143	562	150	.267	26	79
RF	Shawn Green	115	417	118	.283	11	51

==== Other batters ====
Note: G = Games played; AB = At bats; H = Hits; Avg. = Batting average; HR = Home runs; RBI = Runs batted in

Player	G	AB	H	Avg.	HR	RBI
Jeff DaVanon	87	221	64	.290	5	35
Stephen Drew	59	209	66	.316	5	23
Damion Easley	90	189	44	.233	9	28
Chris Snyder	61	184	51	.277	6	32
Carlos Quentin	57	166	42	.253	9	32
Tony Clark	79	132	26	.197	6	16
Andy Green	73	86	16	.186	1	6
Chris Young	30	70	17	.243	2	10
Alberto Callaspo	23	42	10	.238	0	6
Miguel Montero	6	16	4	.250	0	3
Scott Hairston	9	15	6	.200	0	2
Robby Hammock	1	2	1	.500	0	0

=== Pitching ===
==== Starting pitchers ====
Note: G = Games pitched; IP = Innings pitched; W = Wins; L = Losses; ERA = Earned run average; SO = Strikeouts

Player	G	IP	W	L	ERA	SO
Brandon Webb	33	235.0	16	8	3.10	178
Miguel Batista	34	206.1	11	8	4.58	110
Claudio Vargas	31	167.2	12	10	4.83	123
Enrique González	22	106.1	3	7	5.67	66
Liván Hernández	10	69.1	4	5	3.76	39
Orlando Hernández	9	45.2	2	4	6.11	52
Russ Ortiz	6	22.2	0	5	7.54	21
Dustin Nippert	2	10.0	0	2	11.70	9

==== Other pitchers ====
Note: G = Games pitched; IP = Innings pitched; W = Wins; L = Losses; ERA = Earned run average; SO = Strikeouts

Player	G	IP	W	L	ERA	SO
Juan Cruz	31	94.2	5	6	4.18	88
Édgar González	11	42.2	3	4	4.22	28
Kevin Jarvis	5	11.1	0	1	11.91	6

===== Relief pitchers =====
Note: G = Games pitched; W = Wins; L = Losses; SV = Saves; ERA = Earned run average; SO = Strikeouts

Player	G	W	L	SV	ERA	SO
José Valverde	44	2	3	18	5.84	69
Luis Vizcaino	70	4	6	0	3.58	72
Brandon Lyon	68	2	4	0	3.89	46
Brandon Medders	60	5	3	0	3.64	47
Jorge Julio	44	1	2	15	3.83	55
Greg Aquino	42	2	0	0	4.47	51
Randy Choate	30	0	1	0	3.94	12
Tony Peña	25	3	4	1	5.58	21
Jason Grimsley	19	1	2	0	4.88	10
Casey Daigle	10	0	0	0	3.65	7
Doug Slaten	9	0	0	0	0.00	3
Terry Mulholland	5	0	0	0	9.00	1
Mike Koplove	2	0	0	0	3.00	1
Jeff Bajenaru	1	0	1	0	36.00	0

== Awards ==
2B Orlando Hudson became the recipient of his second career Gold Glove Award, as announced on November 3. Hudson became only the sixth infielder in major league history to win a Gold Glove award in both the American and National Leagues. He first received the award after the 2005 season as a member of the Toronto Blue Jays, and was traded to the Diamondbacks later that offseason.

RHP Brandon Webb, a product of the Diamondback farm system, became the ace starting pitcher of the club for 2006 after signing a four-year contract extension. Webb pitched effectively most of the season, beginning by winning his first eight starts, becoming the D-Backs sole representative to the 2006 All-Star Game (in which he pitched a perfect fourth inning), and ending up with a record of 16-8 and an ERA of 3.10.

On November 14, it was announced that Webb was the recipient of the Cy Young Award for the National League. Webb received 15 of 32 first-place votes in balloting by the Baseball Writers' Association of America. Trevor Hoffman of the Padres and Chris Carpenter of the St. Louis Cardinals (the eventual 2006 World Series winners) were runners-up in the voting.

== Farm system ==
Level	Team	League	Manager
AAA	Tucson Sidewinders	Pacific Coast League	Chip Hale
AA	Tennessee Smokies	Southern League	Bill Plummer
A	Lancaster JetHawks	California League	Brett Butler
A	South Bend Silver Hawks	Midwest League	Mark Haley
A-Short Season	Yakima Bears	Northwest League	Jay Gainer
Rookie	Missoula Osprey	Pioneer League	Héctor de la Cruz

LEAGUE CHAMPIONS: Tucson, Missoula
