= Collina =

Collina, an Italian word for "hill", may refer to:

== Biology ==
- Collina (ammonite), a genus of Early Jurassic ammonite
- Collina (spider), a genus of spider

== Places ==
- Collina d'Oro, a municipality in Ticino, Switzerland
- Collina (Port Gibson, Mississippi), listed on the National Register of Historic Places listings in Claiborne County, Mississippi, USA

== Other uses ==
- Pierluigi Collina (born 1960), Italian football referee
- Porta Collina, a Roman landmark

== See also ==
- Collinas, Sardinia
- Colina (disambiguation)
