= Jeff Salazar =

American baseball player and coach (born 1980)

- Outfielder
- Born: November 24, 1980 (age 45); Oklahoma City, Oklahoma, U.S.
- Batted: Left Threw: Left

MLB debut
- September 7, 2006, for the Colorado Rockies

Last MLB appearance
- August 14, 2009, for the Pittsburgh Pirates

MLB statistics
- Batting average: .232
- Home runs: 4
- Runs batted in: 31
- Stats at Baseball Reference

Teams
- As player: Colorado Rockies (2006); Arizona Diamondbacks (2007–2008); Pittsburgh Pirates (2009); As coach: Colorado Rockies (2017–2021)

Jeffrey Dewan Salazar (born November 24, 1980) is an American professional baseball former outfielder and current coach. He was most recently the assistant hitting coach for the Colorado Rockies. He has played in MLB for Colorado, Arizona Diamondbacks, and Pittsburgh Pirates.

== Career ==
=== As a player ===
Salazar was claimed off waivers by the Arizona Diamondbacks from the Colorado Rockies on March 28, 2007. He was recalled by the Diamondbacks on July 6, 2007, after struggling outfielder Carlos Quentin was sent down. Salazar was batting .301 with eight home runs and 50 RBI with the Triple-A Tucson Sidewinders at the time of his recall.

Salazar was non-tendered following the 2008 season, and became a free agent. He signed a minor league contract with the Pittsburgh Pirates on December 22, 2008. In October 2009 Salazar was granted free agency.

On January 15, 2010, Salazar signed a minor league contract with the Baltimore Orioles with an invite to spring training. Salazar became a free agent after the season ended.

Salazar signed a minor league contract with the Colorado Rockies on December 23, 2010. On February 14, 2012, Salazar signed a minor league contract with the Tampa Bay Rays with an invite to spring training. He was released during the All-Star Break on July 10.

=== As a coach ===
Following his playing career, Salazar served as a hitting coach for Santa Barbara High School. Salazar was hired by the Colorado Rockies, and served as the Hartford Yard Goats hitting coach in 2015 and 2016. Salazar was promoted to assistant hitting coach for the Rockies prior to the 2017 season. On October 26, 2021, it was announced that Salazar would be leaving the Rockies organization.
