= John Nelson (infielder) =

American baseball player (born 1979)

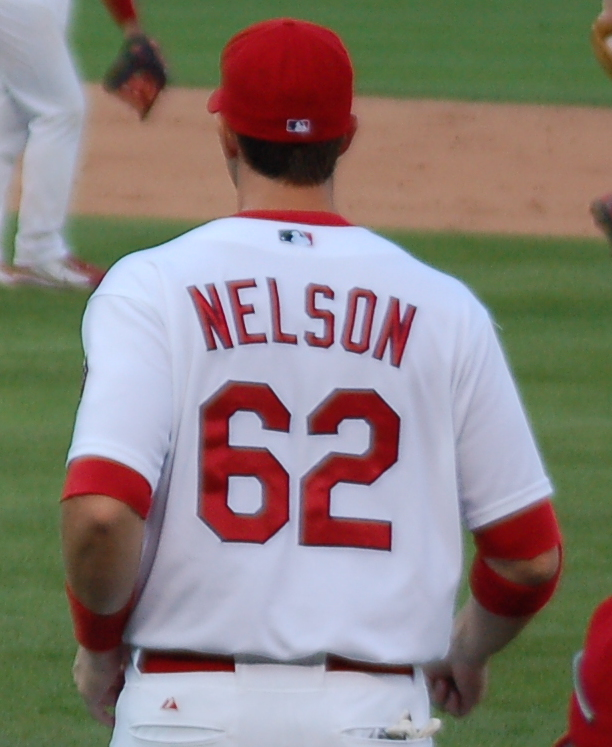
- Nelson with the Cardinals in 2005
- Infielder
- Born: March 3, 1979 (age 47); Denton, Texas, U.S.
- Batted: Right Threw: Right

MLB debut
- September 7, 2006, for the St. Louis Cardinals

Last MLB appearance
- October 1, 2006, for the St. Louis Cardinals

MLB statistics
- Batting average: .000
- Home runs: 0
- Runs batted in: 0
- Stats at Baseball Reference

Teams
- St. Louis Cardinals (2006)

John Clark Nelson (born March 3, 1979) is an American former Major League Baseball shortstop who played for the St. Louis Cardinals in 2006.

== Amateur career ==
A native of Denton, Texas, Nelson played college baseball for the University of Kansas. In 1998, he played collegiate summer baseball with the Falmouth Commodores of the Cape Cod Baseball League, and returned to the league in 1999 to play for the Harwich Mariners.

== Professional career ==
Nelson was selected by the Cardinals in the 8th round of the 2001 MLB draft. Originally an outfielder, the St. Louis Cardinals converted him to a shortstop. Nelson was promoted to the Cardinals on September 5, 2006, wearing the number 62, and made his major league debut on September 7, striking out against the Arizona Diamondbacks' Greg Aquino. In his first big-league action he went 0-5 with 4 strikeouts. He also pinch-ran 3 times and scored 2 runs, playing one game at shortstop and one game at first base.

In 2008, he signed with the Lancaster Barnstormers of the Atlantic League of Professional Baseball.

== Sources ==
- Career statistics from Baseball Reference · Baseball Reference (Minors) · Retrosheet · Baseball Almanac
