= San Borja =

San Borja may refer to:

- San Borja, Bolivia
- San Borja Municipality, Bolivia
- San Borja District, Peru
- São Borja, Brazil
