= Juan Morillo (baseball, born 1983) =

Dominican baseball player (born 1983)

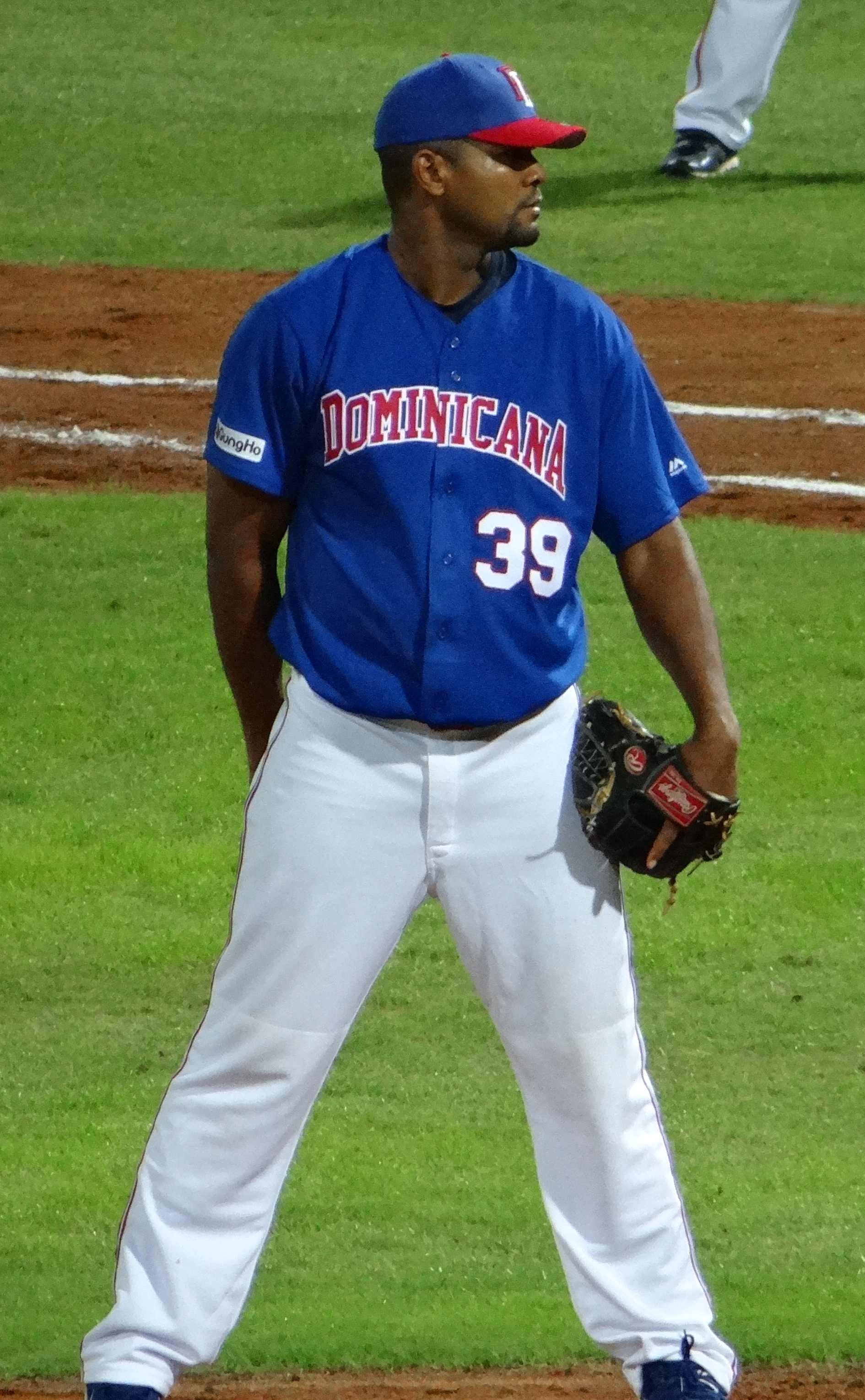
- Morillo pitching for the Dominican Republic national team in 2015
- Relief pitcher
- Born: November 5, 1983 (age 42); San Pedro de Macorís, Dominican Republic
- Batted: Right Threw: Right

Professional debut
- MLB: September 24, 2006, for the Colorado Rockies
- NPB: March 27, 2010, for the Tohoku Rakuten Golden Eagles
- CPBL: August 1, 2013, for the EDA Rhinos

Last appearance
- MLB: April 27, 2009, for the Minnesota Twins
- NPB: May 23, 2010, for the Tohoku Rakuten Golden Eagles
- CPBL: October 6, 2013, for the EDA Rhinos

MLB statistics
- Win–loss record: 0–0
- Earned run average: 13.50
- Strikeouts: 8

NPB statistics
- Win–loss record: 0–0
- Earned run average: 2.70
- Strikeouts: 9

CPBL statistics
- Win–loss record: 2–0
- Earned run average: 4.26
- Strikeouts: 14
- Stats at Baseball Reference

Teams
- Colorado Rockies (2006–2008); Minnesota Twins (2009); Tohoku Rakuten Golden Eagles (2010); EDA Rhinos (2013)

Juan Bautista Morillo (born November 5, 1983) is a Dominican former professional baseball pitcher. He played in Major League Baseball (MLB) for the Colorado Rockies and Minnesota Twins, in Nippon Professional Baseball for the Tohoku Rakuten Golden Eagles, and in the Chinese Professional Baseball League (CPBL) for the EDA Rhinos.

== Career ==
=== Colorado Rockies ===
Morillo signed with the Colorado Rockies as an international free agent in 2003. He made his MLB debut on September 24, 2006, allowing seven runs in four innings pitched against the Atlanta Braves.

While playing with the Double-A Tulsa Drillers in 2007, Morillo had a record of 6–4 in 57 1/3 innings pitched, with 59 strikeouts and 2.35 ERA. He made four appearances for the Rockies during the year, but struggled to a 9.82 ERA with three strikeouts across 3 2/3 innings pitched. Morillo made one appearance for the team the following season on July 20, 2008, tossing a scoreless inning against the Pittsburgh Pirates.

On December 11, 2008, Morillo and Willy Taveras were nearly traded to the Washington Nationals in exchange for Tim Redding, but the deal later fell through. Morillo made the Rockies' Opening Day roster in 2009. On April 10, 2009, Morillo was designated for assignment by the Rockies to clear roster space for Matt Belisle. He had not made an appearance for the team prior to his removal from the roster.

=== Minnesota Twins ===
Morillo was claimed off waivers by the Minnesota Twins on April 17, 2009, replacing Philip Humber, who was designated for assignment. On April 29, Morillo was designated for assignment to clear roster space for Joe Mauer, who was returning from a back injury suffered before spring training. He cleared waivers and was sent outright to the Triple-A Rochester Red Wings on May 1.

=== Tohoku Rakuten Golden Eagles ===
On November 17, 2009, Morillo signed to play with the Tohoku Rakuten Golden Eagles of Nippon Professional Baseball. He made seven appearances for Rakuten in 2010, recording a 2.70 ERA with nine strikeouts across 6 2/3 innings pitched.

=== Philadelphia Phillies ===
On March 25, 2012, after a year of inactivity, Morillo signed a minor league contract with the Philadelphia Phillies. He made 40 appearances split between the Double-A Reading Phillies and Triple-A Lehigh Valley IronPigs, accumulating a 1–2 record and 5.34 ERA with 67 strikeouts over 59 innings of work. Morillo was released by the Phillies organization on March 10, 2013.

=== Vaqueros Unión Laguna ===
On May 7, 2013, Morillo signed with the Vaqueros Unión Laguna of the Mexican League. In nine appearances for the Vaqueros, he struggled to a 1–2 record and 7.88 ERA with nine strikeouts and one save across eight innings pitched.

=== EDA Rhinos ===
Morillo spent the remainder of the 2013 season with the EDA Rhinos of the Chinese Professional Baseball League. In 20 relief appearances for the Rhinos, he posted a 2–0 record and 4.26 ERA with 14 strikeouts and eight saves over 19 innings of work.

=== Baltimore Orioles ===
On February 14, 2014, Morillo signed a minor league contract with the Baltimore Orioles. He made 22 relief appearances for the Double-A Bowie Baysox, logging a 2–0 record and 4.67 ERA with 41 strikeouts across 34 2/3 innings pitched. Morillo was released by the Orioles organization on July 5.

== International career ==
In November 2015, Morillo was selected to the roster for the Dominican Republic national baseball team at the 2015 WBSC Premier12.
