= Borja (name) =

Borja is primarily a male given name of Spanish origin, though it is also used as a surname. Notable people with the name include:

== Surname ==
- Álvaro Alfredo Magaña Borja (1925–2001), interim president of El Salvador
- Chico Borja (1959–2021), U.S.-Ecuadorian soccer player-coach
- Cristian Borja (born 1993), Colombian footballer
- Enrique Borja (born 1945), Mexican footballer
- Félix Borja (born 1983), Ecuadorian footballer
- Francisco de Borja (1441–1511), Spanish cardinal
- James Borja, Guamanian sports administrator
- Jesus Borja (born 1948), Northern Mariana Islander politician and lawyer
- Meliton Borja, Filipino chess master
- Miguel Borja (born 1993), Colombian footballer
- Rodrigo Borja Cevallos (1935–2025), Ecuadorian politician, president (1988–1992)
- Rodrigo de Borja (1431–1503), Italian pope

== Given name ==
- Borja Bastón (born 1992), Spanish footballer
- Borja Casillas Toledo (born 1991), Spanish drag queen
- Borja Cobeaga (born 1977), Spanish filmmaker
- Borja Ekiza (born 1988), Spanish footballer
- Borja Fernández (footballer, born 1981), Spanish footballer
- Borja García (born 1982), Spanish racing driver
- Borja García Freire (born 1990), Spanish footballer
- Borja Gómez (born 1988), Spanish footballer
- Borja Gómez (2005–2025), Spanish motorcycle racer
- Borja Iglesias (born 1993), Spanish footballer
- Borja Mayoral (born 1997), Spanish footballer
- Borja Penalba (born 1975), Spanish composer
- Borja Pérez (born 1982), Spanish footballer
- Borja Prado (born 1956), Spanish businessman, former president of Endesa
- Borja Valero (born 1985), Spanish footballer

== See also ==
- House of Borgia, Valencian-Italian noble family powerful during the Renaissance
