= Alvin Colina =

Venezuelan baseball player (born 1981)

- Catcher
- Born: December 26, 1981 (age 44); Puerto Cabello, Venezuela
- Batted: Right Threw: Right

MLB debut
- September 18, 2006, for the Colorado Rockies

Last MLB appearance
- September 24, 2006, for the Colorado Rockies

MLB statistics
- Batting average: .200
- Home runs: 0
- Runs batted in: 1
- Stats at Baseball Reference

Teams
- Colorado Rockies (2006)

Alvin Enrique Colina (born December 26, 1981) is a Venezuelan former professional baseball catcher. He played in Major League Baseball for the Colorado Rockies in 2006–2007.

== Career ==
Signed by the Colorado Rockies as an amateur free agent in 1998, Colina made his Major League Baseball debut with the Colorado Rockies on September 18, 2006, against the San Francisco Giants at Coors Field in Denver, Colorado. He collected an RBI single in his first at-bat.

Colina was designated for assignment by the Rockies September 7, 2007, and claimed off waivers by the Cincinnati Reds on September 11. Colina did not play for the Reds and became a free agent after the season. On December 5, 2007, the Reds re-signed Colina to a minor league contract with an invitation to spring training. He became a free agent at the end of the 2008 season and signed a minor league contract with an invitation to spring training with the Atlanta Braves in January 2009. In January 2010 Colina, signed a minor league contract with a Spring Training invitation with Tampa Bay Rays

On March 10, 2011, he signed a contract with the Lancaster Barnstormers. and he has played for two other different teams while being in the Atlantic League from 2011 to 2013.

Colina was traded to the Camden Riversharks where he played for 2 seasons and later played with the Southern Maryland Blue Crabs team. While living in Maryland. He resides in his home country of Venezuela as a retired player.

== See also ==
- List of Major League Baseball players from Venezuela
