= Mike Thompson (2000s pitcher) =

American baseball player (born 1980)

- Pitcher
- Born: November 6, 1980 (age 45); Walsh, Colorado, U.S.
- Batted: Right Threw: Right

MLB debut
- May 17, 2006, for the San Diego Padres

Last MLB appearance
- August 11, 2007, for the San Diego Padres

MLB statistics
- Win–loss record: 4–6
- Earned run average: 5.27
- Strikeouts: 40
- Stats at Baseball Reference

Teams
- San Diego Padres (2006–2007)

Michael Paul Thompson (born November 6, 1980) is an American former Major League Baseball pitcher.

The 6'4 right-hander was selected by the San Diego Padres in the 5th round of the 1999 Major League Baseball draft. In 2004, Thompson showed his first signs of serious major league potential with the Double-A Mobile BayBears. That season, he went 10–2 with a 3.41 ERA.

Thompson started the 2006 season with the Triple-A Portland Beavers. He was called up to the Padres on May 17, 2006, defeating the Arizona Diamondbacks in his major league debut. Thompson went on to start 15 more games for the big league club in 2006. In 2008, he played in the Pittsburgh Pirates organization and became a free agent at the end of the season.
