= 2006 Atlanta Braves season =

2006 Atlanta Braves
- League: National League
- Division: East
- Ballpark: Turner Field
- City: Atlanta
- Record: 79–83 (.488)
- Divisional place: 3rd
- Owners: Time Warner
- General managers: John Schuerholz
- Managers: Bobby Cox
- Television: TBS Superstation; Turner South (Pete Van Wieren, Skip Caray, Don Sutton, Joe Simpson, Chip Caray, Ron Gant); FSN South (Jeff Torborg, Bob Rathbun)
- Radio: WGST; WKLS (Pete Van Wieren, Skip Caray, Don Sutton, Joe Simpson, Chip Caray); WWWE (Luis Octavio Dozal, Jose Manuel Flores)

The 2006 Atlanta Braves season was the Braves' 136th for the franchise and 41st in Atlanta. During the season, the Braves attempted to win the National League East.

Finishing with a 79–83 record, not only did the Braves miss the playoffs for the first time since 1990, but also their first losing season that same season. In failing to reach the postseason, Atlanta ended their streak of fourteen consecutive division titles. Atlanta outscored its opponents 849 to 805 on the season, a run differential that corresponded to a Pythagorean winning percentage of .524 (an expected 85–77 record), making the team's sub-.500 finish an underperformance relative to its run production.

== Regular season ==
=== Season standings ===
==== National League East ====
NL East
Team	W	L	Pct.	GB	Home	Road
New York Mets	97	65	.599	—	50‍–‍31	47‍–‍34
Philadelphia Phillies	85	77	.525	12	41‍–‍40	44‍–‍37
Atlanta Braves	79	83	.488	18	40‍–‍41	39‍–‍42
Florida Marlins	78	84	.481	19	42‍–‍39	36‍–‍45
Washington Nationals	71	91	.438	26	41‍–‍40	30‍–‍51

==== Record vs. opponents ====
2006 National League record Source: MLB Standings Grid – 2006
Team	AZ	ATL	CHC	CIN	COL	FLA	HOU	LAD	MIL	NYM	PHI	PIT	SD	SF	STL	WAS	AL
Arizona	—	6–1	4–2	4–2	12–7	2–4	4–5	8–10	3–3	1–6	1–5	5–1	9–10	8–11	4–3	1–5	4–11
Atlanta	1–6	—	6–1	4–3	3–3	11–8	3–4	3–3	2–4	7–11	7–11	3–3	7–2	3–4	4–2	10–8	5–10
Chicago	2–4	1–6	—	10–9	2–4	2–4	7–8	4–2	8–8	3–3	2–5	6–9	0–7	2–4	11–8	2–4	4–11
Cincinnati	2–4	3–4	9–10	—	5–1	4–2	10–5	0–6	9–10	3–4	2–4	9–7	2–4	2–5	9–6	5–1	6-9
Colorado	7–12	3–3	4–2	1–5	—	3–3	4–2	4–15	2–4	1–5	3–4	3–3	10–9	10–8	2–7	8–0	11–4
Florida	4–2	8–11	4–2	2–4	3–3	—	3–4	1–5	7–0	8–11	6–13	5–2	3–3	3–3	1–5	11–7	9–9
Houston	5–4	4–3	8–7	5–10	2–4	4-3	—	3–3	10–5	2–4	2–4	13–3	3–3	1–5	9–7	4–4	7–11
Los Angeles	10–8	3–3	2–4	6–0	15–4	5–1	3–3	—	4–2	3–4	4–3	6–4	5–13	13–6	0–7	4–2	5–10
Milwaukee	3–3	4–2	8–8	10–9	4–2	0–7	5–10	2–4	—	3–3	5–1	7–9	4–3	6–3	7–9	1–5	6–9
New York	6–1	11–7	3–3	4–3	5–1	11–8	4–2	4–3	3–3	—	11–8	5–4	5–2	3–3	4–2	12–6	6–9
Philadelphia	5-1	11–7	5–2	4–2	4–3	13–6	4–2	3–4	1–5	8–11	—	3–3	2–4	5–1	3–3	9–10	5–13
Pittsburgh	1–5	3–3	9–6	7–9	3–3	2–5	3–13	4–6	9–7	4–5	3–3	—	1–5	6–1	6–9	3–3	3–12
San Diego	10–9	2–7	7–0	4–2	9–10	3–3	3–3	13–5	3–4	2–5	4–2	5–1	—	7–12	4–2	5–1	7–8
San Francisco	11–8	4–3	4–2	5–2	8–10	3–3	5–1	6–13	3–6	3–3	1–5	1–6	12–7	—	1–4	1–5	8–7
St. Louis	3–4	2–4	8–11	6–9	7–2	5-1	7–9	7–0	9–7	2–4	3–3	9–6	2–4	4–1	—	4–3	5–10
Washington	5–1	8–10	4–2	1–5	0–8	7-11	4–4	2–4	5–1	6–12	10–9	3–3	1–5	5–1	3–4	—	7–11

=== Transactions ===
- December 8, 2005: Édgar Rentería was traded by the Boston Red Sox with cash to the Atlanta Braves for Andy Marte.
- July 20, 2006: Bob Wickman was traded by the Cleveland Indians to the Atlanta Braves for Max Ramirez (minors).

=== Roster ===
2006 Atlanta Braves
**Roster**
**Pitchers**: 48 Danys Báez; 27 Kevin Barry; 48,78 Blaine Boyer; 40 Lance Cormier; 26 Kyle Davies; 28,34 Joey Devine; 50 Wayne Franklin; 15 Tim Hudson; 43 Chuck James; 36 Anthony Lerew; 49 Macay McBride; 58,27 Peter Moylan; 54 Chad Paronto; 30 Horacio Ramírez; 38 Ken Ray; 37 Chris Reitsma; 36 Mike Remlinger; 35 Jason Shiell; 57 Travis Smith; 29 John Smoltz; 34 Jorge Sosa; 58 Phil Stockman; 52 John Thomson; 56 Óscar Villarreal; 28 Bob Wickman; 57 Tyler Yates	**Catchers**: 16 Brian McCann; 5 Todd Pratt; **Infielders**: 14 Willy Aybar; 24 Wilson Betemit; 22 Marcus Giles; 10 Chipper Jones; 19 Adam LaRoche; 4 Pete Orr; 8 Brayan Peña; 1 Tony Peña Jr.; 14,24 Martín Prado; 11 Édgar Rentería; 12 Daryle Ward	**Outfielders**: 23 Matt Diaz; 7 Jeff Francoeur; 25 Andruw Jones; 33 Brian Jordan; 18 Ryan Langerhans; 20 Scott Thorman	**Manager**: 6 Bobby Cox; **Coaches**: 39 Pat Corrales (bench); 53 Bobby Dews (bullpen); 45 Fredi González (third base); 17 Glenn Hubbard (first base); 51 Roger McDowell (pitching); 9 Terry Pendleton (hitting)

=== Game log ===
2006 Game Log: 79–83 (Home: 40–41; Away: 39–42)
April: 10–14 (Home: 4–5; Away: 6–9)

#	Date	Opponent	Score	Win	Loss	Save	Attendance	Record
1	April 3	@ Dodgers	11–10	**Villarreal** (1–0)	Lowe (0–1)	**Reitsma** (1)	56,000	1–0
2	April 4	@ Dodgers	4–5	Penny (1–0)	**Smoltz** (0–1)	Baez (1)	36,249	1–1
3	April 5	@ Dodgers	9–8	**Villarreal** (2–0)	Osoria (0–1)	**Reitsma** (2)	35,292	2–1
4	April 6	@ Giants	4–6	Fassero (1–0)	**Sosa** (0–1)	Worrell (2)	42,795	2–2
5	April 7	@ Giants	14–6	**Remlinger** (1–0)	Walker (0–1)	—	39,737	3–2
6	April 8	@ Giants	6–12	Wright (1–0)	**Hudson** (0–1)	—	39,050	3–3
7	April 9	@ Giants	5–6	Worrell (1–0)	**Reitsma** (0–1)	—	37,321	3–4
8	April 10	Phillies	5–3	**Villarreal** (3–0)	Franklin (0–1)	**Reitsma** (3)	47,332	4–4
9	April 12	Phillies	5–7	Lidle (1–1)	**Sosa** (0–2)	Gordon (1)	37,107	4–5
10	April 13	Phillies	6–7	Floyd (1–1)	**Davies** (0–1)	Gordon (2)	22,911	4–6
11	April 14	Padres	5–4	**Villarreal** (4–0)	Linebrink (0–1)	**Reitsma** (4)	36,406	5–6
12	April 15	Padres	2–0	**Smoltz** (1–1)	Peavy (1–2)	—	40,151	6–6
13	April 16	Padres	3–4	Linebrink (1–1)	**Remlinger** (1–1)	Hoffman (1)	24,589	6–7
14	April 17	@ Mets	3–4	Martinez (3–0)	**Sosa** (0–3)	Wagner (4)	36,867	6–8
15	April 18	@ Mets	7–1	**Davies** (1–1)	Zambrano (1–1)	—	30,322	7–8
16	April 19	@ Mets	2–1	**Hudson** (1–1)	Glavine (2–1)	—	40,861	8–8
17	April 21	@ Nationals	3–7	Stanton (1–2)	**Cormier** (0–1)	—	24,597	8–9
–	April 22	@ Nationals	Postponed (rain); rescheduled for September 18					
18	April 23	@ Nationals	3–1	**Cormier** (1–1)	Majewski (1–1)	**Remlinger** (1)	21,569	9–9
19	April 24	@ Brewers	2–3	Capuano (3–2)	**Davies** (1–2)	Turnbow (6)	11,660	9–10
20	April 25	@ Brewers	2–4	Ohka (2–1)	**Hudson** (1–2)	Turnbow (7)	16,276	9–11
21	April 26	@ Brewers	4–5	Sheets (1–2)	**Sosa** (0–4)	Turnbow (8)	18,511	9–12
22	April 28	Mets	2–5	Martinez (5–0)	**Smoltz** (1–2)	Wagner (6)	45,389	9–13
23	April 29	Mets	0–1	Glavine (3–2)	**Thomson** (0–1)	Wagner (7)	46,387	9–14
24	April 30	Mets	8–5	**Davies** (2–2)	Trachsel (2–2)	**Reitsma** (5)	35,245	10–14

May: 18–11 (Home: 9–3; Away: 9–8)

#	Date	Opponent	Score	Win	Loss	Save	Attendance	Record
25	May 1	Rockies	2–0	**Hudson** (2–2)	Jennings (1–2)	—	19,212	11–14
26	May 2	Rockies	5–4	**Cormier** (2–1)	King (1–2)	**Reitsma** (6)	22,813	12–14
27	May 3	@ Phillies	4–5	Cormier (2–0)	**Remlinger** (1–2)	Gordon (9)	26,443	12–15
28	May 4	@ Phillies	3–6	Lidle (3–3)	**Thomson** (0–2)	Rhodes (1)	24,842	12–16
29	May 5	@ Mets	7–8 (14)	Julio (1–1)	**Sosa** (0–5)	—	47,720	12–17
30	May 6	@ Mets	5–6	Fortunato (1–0)	**Hudson** (2–3)	Julio (1)	48,369	12–18
31	May 7	@ Mets	13–3	**Smoltz** (2–2)	Lima (0–1)	—	48,100	13–18
32	May 9	@ Marlins	10–2	**Thomson** (1–2)	Moehler (0–4)	—	6,079	14–18
33	May 10	@ Marlins	3–11	Johnson (3–2)	**Davies** (2–3)	—	6,299	14–19
34	May 11	@ Marlins	9–1	**Hudson** (3–3)	Willis (1–4)	—	8,717	15–19
35	May 12	Nationals	6–2	**Smoltz** (3–2)	Ortiz (0–4)	—	31,818	16–19
36	May 13	Nationals	8–5	**Reitsma** (1–1)	Cordero (1–1)	—	37,040	17–19
37	May 14	Nationals	1–8	Armas (4–2)	**Thomson** (1–3)	—	31,062	17–20
38	May 15	Marlins	11–8	**Villarreal** (5–0)	Messenger (0–2)	**Reitsma** (7)	19,254	18–20
39	May 16	Marlins	4–3 (11)	**McBride** (1–0)	Borowski (0–1)	—	22,427	19–20
40	May 17	Marlins	6–4 (11)	**Villarreal** (6–0)	Messenger (0–3)	—	25,647	20–20
41	May 18	Marlins	9–1	**Sosa** (1–5)	Olsen (2–3)	—	29,996	21–20
42	May 19	@ Diamondbacks	9–10	Valverde (2–1)	**Reitsma** (1–2)	—	25,056	21–21
43	May 20	@ Diamondbacks	0–13	Webb (7–0)	**Smith** (0–1)	—	35,382	21–22
44	May 21	@ Diamondbacks	2–1	**Hudson** (4–3)	Cruz (1–3)	**McBride** (1)	33,102	22–22
45	May 22	@ Padres	3–1	**Smoltz** (4–2)	Peavy (3–5)	**Reitsma** (8)	25,869	23–22
46	May 23	@ Padres	1–2	Thompson (2–0)	**Sosa** (1–6)	Hoffman (8)	25,315	23–23
47	May 24	@ Padres	10–6	**Thomson** (2–3)	Young (3–3)	—	23,740	24–23
48	May 26	@ Cubs	6–5	**Remlinger** (2–2)	Dempster (0–3)	**Ray** (1)	40,865	25–23
49	May 27	@ Cubs	2–1	**Ramirez** (1–0)	Marshall (3–3)	**Remlinger** (2)	41,526	26–23
50	May 28	@ Cubs	13–12 (11)	**Villarreal** (7–0)	Eyre (0–1)	**Ray** (2)	41,698	27–23
51	May 29	Dodgers	5–12	Beimel (2–0)	**Thomson** (2–4)	—	41,825	27–24
52	May 30	Dodgers	3–8	Baez (3–2)	**Remlinger** (2–3)	—	29,517	27–25
53	May 31	Dodgers	9–3	**Hudson** (5–3)	Tomko (5–3)	—	28,880	28–25

June: 6–21 (Home: 2–12; Away: 4–9)

#	Date	Opponent	Score	Win	Loss	Save	Attendance	Record
54	June 1	Diamondbacks	1–2	Cruz (3–3)	**Ramirez** (1–1)	Julio (2)	23,376	28–26
–	June 2	Diamondbacks	Postponed (rain); rescheduled for June 3					
55	June 3 (1)	Diamondbacks	2–4	Gonzalez (1–0)	**Smoltz** (4–3)	Julio (3)	27,126	28–27
56	June 3 (2)	Diamondbacks	9–13	Vargas (6–2)	**Thomson** (2–5)	—	40,212	28–28
57	June 4	Diamondbacks	3–9	Batista (6–2)	**Sosa** (1–7)	—	29,141	28–29
58	June 5	Nationals	4–5	Hernandez (5–5)	**Hudson** (5–4)	Cordero (10)	20,702	28–30
59	June 6	Nationals	5–3	**Ramirez** (2–1)	Hill (0–1)	**Ray** (3)	23,497	29–30
60	June 7	Nationals	2–5	Ortiz (5–4)	**Smoltz** (4–4)	Cordero (11)	32,001	29–31
61	June 8	@ Astros	4–7	Pettitte (5–7)	**Thomson** (2–6)	Lidge (16)	35,752	29–32
62	June 9	@ Astros	2–7	Nieve (2–3)	**Sosa** (1–8)	—	37,097	29–33
63	June 10	@ Astros	4–2	**Hudson** (6–4)	Buchholz (3–6)	**Ray** (4)	41,808	30–33
64	June 11	@ Astros	4–14	Rodriguez (8–3)	**Ramirez** (2–2)	—	39,523	30–34
65	June 13	@ Marlins	1–4	Johnson (5–4)	**Smoltz** (4–5)	Borowski (9)	6,940	30–35
66	June 14	@ Marlins	5–6 (10)	Tankersley (1–0)	**Villarreal** (7–1)	—	8,097	30–36
67	June 15	@ Marlins	2–3	Nolasco (5–3)	**Sosa** (1–9)	Borowski (10)	7,162	30–37
68	June 16	Red Sox	1–4	Lester (1–0)	**Hudson** (6–5)	Papelbon (21)	51,038	30–38
69	June 17	Red Sox	3–5	Beckett (8–3)	**Cormier** (2–2)	Papelbon (22)	49,364	30–39
70	June 18	Red Sox	7–10	Seanez (2–0)	**McBride** (1–1)	Papelbon (23)	48,826	30–40
71	June 20	Blue Jays	5–6	Schoeneweis (2–0)	**Yates** (0–1)	Ryan (18)	26,915	30–41
72	June 21	Blue Jays	3–6	Lilly (7–7)	**Hudson** (6–6)	Ryan (19)	26,232	30–42
73	June 22	Blue Jays	2–3	Taubenheim (1–4)	**Remlinger** (2–4)	Ryan (20)	26,829	30–43
74	June 23	@ Devil Rays	4–3 (11)	**Sosa** (2–9)	Harville (0–1)	—	21,280	31–43
75	June 24	@ Devil Rays	2–3	Corcoran (1–0)	**Cormier** (2–3)	Harville (1)	26,686	31–44
76	June 25	@ Devil Rays	4–1	**James** (1–0)	Hendrickson (4–8)	**Sosa** (1)	20,556	32–44
77	June 26	@ Yankees	2–5	Johnson (9–6)	**Hudson** (6–7)	Rivera (17)	54,226	32–45
78	June 27	@ Yankees	5–2	**Ramirez** (3–2)	Wright (4–5)	—	53,763	33–45
79	June 28	@ Yankees	3–4 (12)	Villone (1–1)	**Sosa** (2–10)	—	54,186	33–46
80	June 30	Orioles	5–3	**James** (2–0)	Birkins (2–1)	**Sosa** (2)	34,581	34–46

July: 14–10 (Home: 7–8; Away: 7–2)

#	Date	Opponent	Score	Win	Loss	Save	Attendance	Record
81	July 1	Orioles	4–7	Birkins (3–1)	**Hudson** (6–8)	—	38,414	34–47
82	July 2	Orioles	10–3	**Ramirez** (4–2)	Benson (9–6)	—	27,693	35–47
83	July 3	Cardinals	6–3	**Smoltz** (5–5)	Reyes (1–3)	**Sosa** (3)	40,011	36–47
84	July 4	Cardinals	3–6	Carpenter (7–4)	**Thomson** (2–7)	Isringhausen (25)	47,514	36–48
85	July 5	Cardinals	14–4	**James** (3–0)	Suppan (6–5)	—	28,705	37–48
86	July 6	Reds	8–7 (10)	**Ray** (1–0)	Coffey (3–4)	—	28,446	38–48
87	July 7	Reds	5–10	Milton (5–4)	**Ramirez** (4–3)	—	32,315	38–49
88	July 8	Reds	4–1	**Smoltz** (6–5)	Harang (9–6)	**Ray** (5)	44,718	39–49
89	July 9	Reds	8–3	**Villarreal** (8–1)	Arroyo (9–6)	—	31,908	40–49
**77th All-Star Game in Pittsburgh, Pennsylvania**
90	July 14	@ Padres	15–12 (11)	**Sosa** (3–10)	Hensley (5–7)	**Yates** (1)	42,869	41–49
91	July 15	@ Padres	11–3	**Smoltz** (7–5)	Park (6–5)	—	39,988	42–49
92	July 16	@ Padres	10–5	**James** (4–0)	Peavy (4–9)	—	31,650	43–49
93	July 17	@ Cardinals	15–3	**Ramirez** (5–3)	Weaver (3–11)	—	44,507	44–49
94	July 18	@ Cardinals	14–5	**Hudson** (7–8)	Marquis (11–7)	—	44,718	45–49
95	July 19	@ Cardinals	3–8	Carpenter (9–4)	**Shiell** (0–1)	—	43,991	45–50
96	July 21	@ Phillies	5–6	Lidle (7–7)	**Ray** (1–1)	Gordon (23)	32,833	45–51
–	July 22	@ Phillies	Postponed (rain); rescheduled for September 2					
97	July 23	@ Phillies	5–1	**McBride** (2–1)	Myers (6–4)	—	31,664	46–51
98	July 24	@ Phillies	10–8	**Hudson** (8–8)	Hamels (2–5)	**Wickman** (16)	28,864	47–51
99	July 25	Marlins	1–2	Sanchez (4–0)	**James** (4–1)	Borowski (21)	33,357	47–52
100	July 26	Marlins	6–5	**Smoltz** (8–5)	Tankersley (1–1)	**Wickman** (17)	32,209	48–52
101	July 27	Marlins	1–6	Olsen (9–4)	**Shiell** (0–2)	—	34,498	48–53
102	July 28	Mets	4–6	Martinez (8–4)	**Ramirez** (5–4)	Wagner (21)	53,943	48–54
103	July 29	Mets	3–11	Hernandez (7–8)	**Hudson** (8–9)	—	49,047	48–55
104	July 30	Mets	6–10	Oliver (4–0)	**James** (4–2)	Wagner (22)	40,526	48–56

August: 15–13 (Home: 8–7; Away: 7–6)

#	Date	Opponent	Score	Win	Loss	Save	Attendance	Record
105	August 1	@ Pirates	4–2	**Smoltz** (9–5)	Snell (9–7)	**Wickman** (18)	22,145	49–56
106	August 2	@ Pirates	3–2	**Yates** (1–1)	Torres (3–5)	**Wickman** (19)	21,064	50–56
107	August 3	@ Pirates	2–3	Chacon (6–3)	**Hudson** (8–10)	Gonzalez (19)	17,324	50–57
108	August 4	@ Reds	4–5	Harang (12–7)	**James** (4–3)	Guardado (12)	33,661	50–58
109	August 5	@ Reds	6–8	Weathers (4–3)	**Yates** (1–2)	Bray (2)	33,170	50–59
110	August 6	@ Reds	6–4	**McBride** (3–1)	Majewski (4–4)	**Wickman** (20)	29,660	51–59
111	August 7	Phillies	6–9	Myers (8–5)	**Ramirez** (5–5)	—	26,177	51–60
112	August 8	Phillies	3–1	**Hudson** (9–10)	Hamels (4–6)	**Wickman** (21)	30,714	52–60
113	August 9	Phillies	3–9	White (2–0)	**Yates** (1–3)	—	27,222	52–61
114	August 11	Brewers	2–1	**Smoltz** (10–5)	Turnbow (4–8)	—	31,336	53–61
115	August 12	Brewers	5–8	Sheets (3–4)	**Barry** (0–1)	F. Cordero (12)	40,480	53–62
116	August 13	Brewers	7–4	**Paronto** (1–0)	Wise (5–6)	**Wickman** (22)	34,718	54–62
117	August 14	@ Nationals	10–4	**James** (5–3)	Ortiz (9–10)	—	21,550	55–62
118	August 15	@ Nationals	0–5	Astacio (3–2)	**Cormier** (2–4)	—	24,036	55–63
119	August 16	@ Nationals	6–9	Traber (3–1)	**Smoltz** (10–6)	C. Cordero (22)	28,094	55–64
120	August 17	@ Nationals	5–0	**Villarreal** (9–1)	Bergmann (0–1)	—	29,007	56–64
121	August 18	@ Marlins	6–1	**Hudson** (10–10)	Olsen (9–7)	—	19,161	57–64
122	August 19	@ Marlins	5–3	**James** (6–3)	Nolasco (11–8)	**Wickman** (23)	21,428	58–64
123	August 20	@ Marlins	3–4	Willis (8–10)	**Yates** (1–4)	Borowski (27)	16,461	58–65
124	August 21	Pirates	3–0	**Smoltz** (11–6)	Duke (8–11)	**Wickman** (24)	21,898	59–65
125	August 22	Pirates	3–5	Marte (1–7)	**Baez** (5–6)	Gonzalez (22)	21,830	59–66
126	August 23	Pirates	4–5	Capps (4–1)	**Paronto** (1–1)	Gonzalez (23)	23,082	59–67
127	August 25	Nationals	6–7	Wagner (1–2)	**Paronto** (1–2)	Rivera (1)	33,621	59–68
128	August 26	Nationals	10–1	**Smoltz** (12–6)	Astacio (3–4)	—	38,610	60–68
129	August 27	Nationals	13–6	**McBride** (4–1)	Traber (3–3)	—	30,587	61–68
130	August 29	Giants	13–8	**Hudson** (11–10)	Schmidt (10–8)	—	23,756	62–68
131	August 30	Giants	5–3	**James** (7–3)	Hennessey (5–4)	**Wickman** (25)	24,952	63–68
132	August 31	Giants	6–8	Morris (10–11)	**Smoltz** (12–7)	Benitez (17)	24,748	63–69

September/October: 16–14 (Home: 10–6; Away: 6–8)

#	Date	Opponent	Score	Win	Loss	Save	Attendance	Record
–	September 1	@ Phillies	Postponed (rain); rescheduled for September 3					
133	September 2 (1)	@ Phillies	4–3	**Yates** (2–4)	Rhodes (0–4)	**Wickman** (26)	31,717	64–69
134	September 2 (2)	@ Phillies	4–16	Brito (1–2)	**Davies** (2–4)	—	28,600	64–70
135	September 3 (1)	@ Phillies	7–8	Geary (7–0)	**Wickman** (1–5)	—	N/A	64–71
136	September 3 (2)	@ Phillies	3–1 (11)	**Paronto** (2–2)	Geary (7–1)	**Wickman** (27)	37,044	65–71
137	September 4	@ Mets	5–0	**James** (8–3)	Trachsel (14–6)	—	42,428	66–71
–	September 5	@ Mets	Postponed (rain); rescheduled for September 6					
138	September 6 (1)	@ Mets	1–4	Williams (5–3)	**Smoltz** (12–8)	Wagner (35)	N/A	66–72
139	September 6 (2)	@ Mets	0–8	O. Perez (3–11)	**Davies** (2–5)	—	40,536	66–73
140	September 8	Cubs	8–4	**Hudson** (12–10)	Guzman (0–5)	—	30,977	67–73
141	September 9	Cubs	7–3	**James** (9–3)	Miller (0–1)	—	40,584	68–73
142	September 10	Cubs	2–1	**Cormier** (3–4)	Mateo (1–3)	**Wickman** (28)	28,212	69–73
143	September 11	Cubs	3–8	Hill (5–6)	**Smoltz** (12–9)	—	19,444	69–74
–	September 12	Phillies	Postponed (rain); rescheduled for September 13					
144	September 13 (1)	Phillies	5–6	White (4–1)	**Paronto** (2–3)	Gordon (29)	N/A	69–75
145	September 13 (2)	Phillies	2–7	Lieber (8–9)	**Hudson** (12–11)	—	22,233	69–76
146	September 14	Phillies	4–1	**James** (10–3)	Moyer (8–14)	**Wickman** (29)	19,352	70–76
147	September 15	Marlins	4–6	Willis (11–11)	**Cormier** (3–5)	Borowski (34)	25,340	70–77
148	September 16	Marlins	2–1	**Smoltz** (13–9)	Sanchez (8–3)	**Wickman** (30)	28,392	71–77
149	September 17	Marlins	8–7 (10)	**Barry** (1–1)	Borowski (3–3)	—	27,192	72–77
150	September 18	@ Nationals	6–1	**Davies** (3–5)	Armas (8–12)	—	25,211	73–77
151	September 19	@ Nationals	2–9	B. Perez (1–0)	**James** (10–4)	—	20,596	73–78
152	September 20	@ Nationals	7–3	**Cormier** (4–5)	Ortiz (10–15)	—	19,027	74–78
153	September 21	@ Rockies	6–3	**Smoltz** (14–9)	Kim (8–12)	**Wickman** (31)	18,499	75–78
154	September 22	@ Rockies	4–6	Fogg (10–9)	**Hudson** (12–12)	Fuentes (27)	33,260	75–79
155	September 23	@ Rockies	9–10	Francis (13–11)	**Davies** (3–6)	Fuentes (28)	24,300	75–80
156	September 24	@ Rockies	8–9	Affeldt (8–7)	**Yates** (2–5)	Fuentes (29)	30,216	75–81
157	September 26	Mets	12–0	**Smoltz** (15–9)	O. Perez (3–13)	—	22,607	76–81
158	September 27	Mets	13–1	**Hudson** (13–12)	Martinez (9–8)	—	23,177	77–81
159	September 28	Mets	4–7	Hernandez (11–11)	**Davies** (3–7)	—	22,944	77–82
160	September 29	Astros	4–1	**James** (11–4)	Clemens (7–6)	**Wickman** (32)	31,034	78–82
161	September 30	Astros	4–5	Miller (2–3)	**Wickman** (1–6)	Wheeler (9)	40,123	78–83
162	October 1	Astros	3–1	**Smoltz** (16–9)	Sampson (2–1)	**Wickman** (33)	36,030	79–83

Legend: = Win = Loss = Eliminated
Bold = Braves team member

== Player stats ==
=== Batting ===
==== Starters by position ====
Note: Pos = Position; G = Games played; AB = At bats; H = Hits; Avg. = Batting average; HR = Home runs; RBI = Runs batted in

Pos	Player	G	AB	H	Avg.	HR	RBI
C	Brian McCann	130	442	147	.333	24	93
1B	Adam LaRoche	149	492	140	.285	32	90
2B	Marcus Giles	141	550	144	.262	11	60
SS	Édgar Rentería	149	598	175	.293	14	70
3B	Chipper Jones	110	411	133	.324	26	86
LF	Ryan Langerhans	131	315	76	.241	7	28
CF	Andruw Jones	156	565	148	.262	41	129
RF	Jeff Francoeur	162	651	169	.260	29	103

==== Other batters ====
Note: G = Games played; AB = At bats; H = Hits; Avg. = Batting average; HR = Home runs; RBI = Runs batted in

Player	G	AB	H	Avg.	HR	RBI
Matt Diaz	124	297	97	.327	7	32
Wilson Betemit	88	199	56	.281	9	29
Pete Orr	102	154	39	.253	1	8
Todd Pratt	62	135	28	.207	4	19
Scott Thorman	55	128	30	.234	5	14
Willy Aybar	36	115	36	.313	1	8
Brian Jordan	48	91	21	.231	3	10
Tony Peña Jr.	40	44	10	.227	1	3
Martin Prado	24	42	11	.262	1	9
Brayan Peña	23	41	11	.268	1	5
Daryle Ward	20	26	8	.308	1	7

=== Pitching ===
==== Starting pitchers ====
Note: G = Games pitched; IP = Innings pitched; W = Wins; L = Losses; ERA = Earned run average; SO = Strikeouts

Player	G	IP	W	L	ERA	SO
John Smoltz	35	232.0	16	9	3.49	211
Tim Hudson	35	218.1	13	12	4.86	141
Chuck James	25	119.0	11	4	3.78	91
John Thomson	18	80.1	2	7	4.82	46
Horacio Ramírez	14	76.1	5	5	4.48	37
Kyle Davies	14	63.1	3	7	8.38	51
Jason Shiell	4	15.2	0	2	8.62	14
Travis Smith	1	4.1	0	1	4.15	1

==== Other pitchers ====
Note: G = Games pitched; IP = Innings pitched; W = Wins; L = Losses; ERA = Earned run average; SO = Strikeouts

Player	G	IP	W	L	ERA	SO
Jorge Sosa	26	87.1	3	10	5.46	58
Lance Cormier	29	73.2	4	5	4.89	43

==== Relief pitchers ====
Note: G = Games pitched; W = Wins; L = Losses; SV = Saves; ERA = Earned run average; SO = Strikeouts

Player	G	W	L	SV	ERA	SO
Bob Wickman	28	0	2	18	1.04	25
Macay McBride	71	4	1	1	3.65	46
Ken Ray	69	1	1	5	4.52	50
Chad Paronto	65	2	3	0	3.18	41
Óscar Villarreal	58	9	1	0	3.61	55
Tyler Yates	56	2	5	1	3.96	46
Mike Remlinger	36	2	4	2	4.03	19
Chris Reitsma	27	1	2	8	8.68	13
Kevin Barry	19	1	1	0	5.61	19
Peter Moylan	15	0	0	0	4.80	14
Danys Báez	11	0	1	0	5.40	10
Wayne Franklin	11	0	0	0	7.04	3
Joey Devine	10	0	0	0	9.95	10
Phil Stockman	4	0	0	0	2.25	4
Blaine Boyer	2	0	0	0	40.50	0
Anthony Lerew	1	0	0	0	22.50	1

== Farm system ==
Level	Team	League	Manager
AAA	Richmond Braves	International League	Brian Snitker
AA	Mississippi Braves	Southern League	Jeff Blauser
A	Myrtle Beach Pelicans	Carolina League	Rocket Wheeler
A	Rome Braves	South Atlantic League	Randy Ingle
Rookie	Danville Braves	Appalachian League	Paul Runge
Rookie	GCL Braves	Gulf Coast League	Luis Ortiz

LEAGUE CHAMPIONS: Danville
