= 2006 Philadelphia Phillies season =

2006 Philadelphia Phillies
- League: National League
- Division: East
- Ballpark: Citizens Bank Park
- City: Philadelphia
- Record: 85–77 (.525)
- Divisional place: 2nd
- Owners: Bill Giles
- General managers: Pat Gillick
- Managers: Charlie Manuel
- Television: WPSG/KYW-TV; CSN Philadelphia (Harry Kalas, Larry Andersen, Chris Wheeler, Scott Graham, Scott Franzke)
- Radio: WIP/WPHT (Harry Kalas, Larry Andersen, Chris Wheeler, Scott Graham, Scott Franzke); WDAS (Bill Kulik, Danny Martinez)

The 2006 Philadelphia Phillies season was the 124th season in the history of the franchise. The Phillies finished in second place in the National League East, 12 games behind the New York Mets, and three games behind the Los Angeles Dodgers in the NL Wild-Card race. The Phillies, managed by Charlie Manuel, played their home games at Citizens Bank Park. Phillies first baseman Ryan Howard was the National League's Most Valuable Player for the 2006 season, and was the winner of the Century 21 Home Run Derby, held during the All-Star Break at Pittsburgh.

== Offseason ==
- November 25, 2005: Jim Thome was traded by the Phillies with cash to the Chicago White Sox for a player to be named later, Aaron Rowand, and Daniel Haigwood (minors). The White Sox sent Gio González (minors) (December 8, 2005) to the Phillies to complete the trade.
- March 1, 2006: Alex Gonzalez was signed as a free agent with the Phillies.

== Regular season ==
=== Season standings ===
==== National League East ====
NL East
Team	W	L	Pct.	GB	Home	Road
New York Mets	97	65	.599	—	50‍–‍31	47‍–‍34
Philadelphia Phillies	85	77	.525	12	41‍–‍40	44‍–‍37
Atlanta Braves	79	83	.488	18	40‍–‍41	39‍–‍42
Florida Marlins	78	84	.481	19	42‍–‍39	36‍–‍45
Washington Nationals	71	91	.438	26	41‍–‍40	30‍–‍51

==== Record vs. opponents ====
2006 National League record Source: MLB Standings Grid – 2006
Team	AZ	ATL	CHC	CIN	COL	FLA	HOU	LAD	MIL	NYM	PHI	PIT	SD	SF	STL	WAS	AL
Arizona	—	6–1	4–2	4–2	12–7	2–4	4–5	8–10	3–3	1–6	1–5	5–1	9–10	8–11	4–3	1–5	4–11
Atlanta	1–6	—	6–1	4–3	3–3	11–8	3–4	3–3	2–4	7–11	7–11	3–3	7–2	3–4	4–2	10–8	5–10
Chicago	2–4	1–6	—	10–9	2–4	2–4	7–8	4–2	8–8	3–3	2–5	6–9	0–7	2–4	11–8	2–4	4–11
Cincinnati	2–4	3–4	9–10	—	5–1	4–2	10–5	0–6	9–10	3–4	2–4	9–7	2–4	2–5	9–6	5–1	6-9
Colorado	7–12	3–3	4–2	1–5	—	3–3	4–2	4–15	2–4	1–5	3–4	3–3	10–9	10–8	2–7	8–0	11–4
Florida	4–2	8–11	4–2	2–4	3–3	—	3–4	1–5	7–0	8–11	6–13	5–2	3–3	3–3	1–5	11–7	9–9
Houston	5–4	4–3	8–7	5–10	2–4	4-3	—	3–3	10–5	2–4	2–4	13–3	3–3	1–5	9–7	4–4	7–11
Los Angeles	10–8	3–3	2–4	6–0	15–4	5–1	3–3	—	4–2	3–4	4–3	6–4	5–13	13–6	0–7	4–2	5–10
Milwaukee	3–3	4–2	8–8	10–9	4–2	0–7	5–10	2–4	—	3–3	5–1	7–9	4–3	6–3	7–9	1–5	6–9
New York	6–1	11–7	3–3	4–3	5–1	11–8	4–2	4–3	3–3	—	11–8	5–4	5–2	3–3	4–2	12–6	6–9
Philadelphia	5-1	11–7	5–2	4–2	4–3	13–6	4–2	3–4	1–5	8–11	—	3–3	2–4	5–1	3–3	9–10	5–13
Pittsburgh	1–5	3–3	9–6	7–9	3–3	2–5	3–13	4–6	9–7	4–5	3–3	—	1–5	6–1	6–9	3–3	3–12
San Diego	10–9	2–7	7–0	4–2	9–10	3–3	3–3	13–5	3–4	2–5	4–2	5–1	—	7–12	4–2	5–1	7–8
San Francisco	11–8	4–3	4–2	5–2	8–10	3–3	5–1	6–13	3–6	3–3	1–5	1–6	12–7	—	1–4	1–5	8–7
St. Louis	3–4	2–4	8–11	6–9	7–2	5-1	7–9	7–0	9–7	2–4	3–3	9–6	2–4	4–1	—	4–3	5–10
Washington	5–1	8–10	4–2	1–5	0–8	7-11	4–4	2–4	5–1	6–12	10–9	3–3	1–5	5–1	3–4	—	7–11

=== Transactions ===
- May 21, 2006: Alex Gonzalez retired from the Phillies.
- July 28, 2006: David Bell was traded by the Phillies to the Milwaukee Brewers for Wilfrido Laureano (minors).
- July 30, 2006: Bobby Abreu and Cory Lidle were traded by the Phillies to the New York Yankees for minor league prospects.
- September 1, 2006: Randall Simon was purchased by the Phillies from the Texas Rangers.

=== Game log ===
Legend
Phillies win
Phillies loss
Postponement
Eliminated from playoff spot
**Bold** = Phillies team member

2006 game log
April (10–14)

#	Date	Opponent	Score	Win	Loss	Save	Attendance	Record
1	April 3	Cardinals	5–13	Chris Carpenter (1–0)	**Jon Lieber** (0–1)	None	44,614	0–1
2	April 5	Cardinals	3–4	Brad Thompson (1–0)	**Tom Gordon** (0–1)	Jason Isringhausen (1)	20,557	0–2
3	April 6	Cardinals	2–4	Jason Marquis (1–0)	**Cory Lidle** (0–1)	Jason Isringhausen (2)	20,413	0–3
4	April 7	Dodgers	3–5	Brett Tomko (1–0)	**Gavin Floyd** (0–1)	Danys Báez (2)	25,518	0–4
–	April 8	Dodgers	Postponed (rain); Makeup: April 9 as a traditional double-header					
5	April 9 (1)	Dodgers	6–3	**Tom Gordon** (1–1)	Tim Hamulack (0–1)	None	see 2nd game	1–4
6	April 9 (2)	Dodgers	2–6	Brad Penny (2–0)	**Jon Lieber** (0–2)	None	38,056	1–5
7	April 10	@ Braves	3–5	Óscar Villarreal (3–0)	**Ryan Franklin** (0–1)	Chris Reitsma (3)	47,332	1–6
8	April 12	@ Braves	7–5	**Cory Lidle** (1–1)	Jorge Sosa (0–2)	**Tom Gordon** (1)	37,107	2–6
9	April 13	@ Braves	7–6	**Gavin Floyd** (1–1)	Kyle Davies (0–1)	**Tom Gordon** (2)	22,911	3–6
10	April 14	@ Rockies	10–8	**Ryan Madson** (1–0)	Zach Day (1–1)	**Tom Gordon** (3)	25,390	4–6
11	April 15	@ Rockies	6–10	Ray King (1–1)	**Jon Lieber** (0–3)	None	23,206	4–7
12	April 16	@ Rockies	1–0	**Brett Myers** (1–0)	Aaron Cook (1–2)	**Tom Gordon** (4)	25,144	5–7
13	April 18	Nationals	3–10	Tony Armas Jr. (1–2)	**Cory Lidle** (1–2)	None	20,072	5–8
14	April 19	Nationals	7–6 (10)	**Ryan Franklin** (1–1)	Mike Stanton (0–2)	None	27,913	6–8
15	April 20	Nationals	4–10	Billy Traber (1–0)	**Ryan Madson** (1–1)	None	28,177	6–9
16	April 21	Marlins	3–4	Scott Olsen (1–1)	**Jon Lieber** (0–4)	Joe Borowski (2)	20,227	6–10
–	April 22	Marlins	Postponed (rain); Makeup: July 30 as a day-night double-header					
17	April 23	Marlins	4–2	**Brett Myers** (2–0)	Sergio Mitre (1–2)	**Tom Gordon** (5)	40,383	7–10
18	April 24	Rockies	6–5	**Cory Lidle** (2–2)	Josh Fogg (2–1)	**Tom Gordon** (6)	20,244	8–10
19	April 25	Rockies	6–7	Ramón Ramírez (1–0)	**Gavin Floyd** (1–2)	Brian Fuentes (3)	19,512	8–11
20	April 26	Rockies	9–5	**Ryan Madson** (2–1)	Jason Jennings (1–1)	None (9)	19,182	9–11
21	April 27	Rockies	3–6	Aaron Cook (2–3)	**Ryan Franklin** (1–2)	Brian Fuentes (4)	21,506	9–12
22	April 28	@ Pirates	1–3	Ian Snell (1–2)	**Brett Myers** (2–1)	Michael Gonzalez (3)	30,568	9–13
23	April 29	@ Pirates	2–3	Paul Maholm (1–3)	**Cory Lidle** (2–3)	Roberto Hernández (2)	33,944	9–14
24	April 30	@ Pirates	5–1	**Gavin Floyd** (2–2)	Óliver Pérez (1–4)	None	22,320	10–14

May (17–11)

#	Date	Opponent	Score	Win	Loss	Save	Attendance	Record
25	May 1	@ Marlins	8–5	**Rhéal Cormier** (1–0)	Dontrelle Willis (1–2)	**Tom Gordon** (7)	6,017	11–14
26	May 2	@ Marlins	7–5	**Jon Lieber** (1–4)	Ricky Nolasco (1–1)	**Tom Gordon** (8)	6,652	12–14
27	May 3	Braves	5–4	**Rhéal Cormier** (2–0)	Mike Remlinger (1–2)	**Tom Gordon** (9)	26,443	13–14
28	May 4	Braves	6–3	**Cory Lidle** (3–3)	John Thomson (0–2)	**Arthur Rhodes** (1)	24,842	14–14
29	May 5	Giants	8–3	**Gavin Floyd** (3–2)	Matt Cain (1–4)	None	37,269	15–14
30	May 6	Giants	4–1	**Ryan Madson** (3–1)	Jamey Wright (2–3)	**Tom Gordon** (10)	44,042	16–14
31	May 7	Giants	9–5	**Jon Lieber** (2–4)	Matt Morris (2–3)	None	39,315	17–14
32	May 9	Mets	5–4	**Tom Gordon** (2–1)	Aaron Heilman (0–1)	None	33,787	18–14
33	May 10	Mets	4–13	Tom Glavine (5–2)	**Cory Lidle** (3–4)	None	30,269	18–15
34	May 11	Mets	2–0 (5, Rain)	**Gavin Floyd** (4–2)	Steve Trachsel (2–3)	None (4)	28,224	19–15
35	May 12	@ Reds	8–4	**Ryan Madson** (4–1)	Elizardo Ramírez (1–3)	**Tom Gordon** (11)	21,705	20–15
36	May 13	@ Reds	2–0	**Jon Lieber** (3–4)	Dave Williams (2–3)	**Tom Gordon** (12)	32,624	21–15
37	May 14	@ Reds	2–1 (12)	**Geoff Geary** (1–0)	Chris Hammond (0–1)	**Tom Gordon** (13)	19,676	22–15
38	May 16	@ Brewers	2–3	Derrick Turnbow (1–1)	**Ryan Franklin** (1–3)	None	14,592	22–16
39	May 17	@ Brewers	7–8	José Capellán (1–0)	**Arthur Rhodes** (0–1)	None	20,874	22–17
40	May 18	@ Brewers	4–5	Justin Lehr (2–1)	**Ryan Madson** (4–2)	Derrick Turnbow (13)	27,419	22–18
41	May 19	Red Sox	3–5	Matt Clement (4–3)	**Jon Lieber** (3–5)	Jonathan Papelbon (15)	44,296	22–19
42	May 20	Red Sox	4–8	Josh Beckett (6–1)	**Brett Myers** (2–2)	None	44,809	22–20
43	May 21	Red Sox	10–5	**Cory Lidle** (4–4)	Lenny DiNardo (1–2)	None	44,738	23–20
44	May 23	@ Mets	8–9 (16)	Darren Oliver (2–0)	**Ryan Madson** (4–3)	None	28,948	23–21
45	May 24	@ Mets	4–5	Pedro Feliciano (1–0)	**Rhéal Cormier** (2–1)	Billy Wagner (10)	32,094	23–22
46	May 25	@ Mets	5–3	**Brett Myers** (3–2)	Pedro Feliciano (1–1)	**Tom Gordon** (14)	51,365	24–22
47	May 26	Brewers	5–6 (10)	Derrick Turnbow (2–1)	**Tom Gordon** (2–2)	Brian Shouse (1)	43,852	24–23
48	May 27	Brewers	6–9	Matt Wise (3–2)	**Ryan Franklin** (1–4)	Derrick Turnbow (15)	32,089	24–24
49	May 28	Brewers	6–2	**Ryan Madson** (5–3)	Dana Eveland (0–2)	None	35,674	25–24
50	May 29	Nationals	11–2	**Clay Condrey** (1–0)	Michael O'Connor (2–3)	None (10)	33,682	26–24
51	May 30	Nationals	4–2	**Brett Myers** (4–2)	Tony Armas Jr. (5–3)	**Tom Gordon** (15)	23,805	27–24
52	May 31	Nationals	2–3	Liván Hernández (4–5)	**Cory Lidle** (4–5)	Chad Cordero (8)	30,386	27–25

June (9–18)

#	Date	Opponent	Score	Win	Loss	Save	Attendance	Record
53	June 1	@ Dodgers	2–7	Derek Lowe (4–3)	**Gavin Floyd** (4–3)	None	38,643	27–26
54	June 2	@ Dodgers	8–6	**Geoff Geary** (2–0)	Danys Báez (3–3)	**Tom Gordon** (16)	55,142	28–26
55	June 3	@ Dodgers	2–8	Brad Penny (6–1)	**Eude Brito** (0–1)	None	46,561	28–27
56	June 4	@ Dodgers	6–4	**Geoff Geary** (3–0)	Joe Beimel (2–1)	**Tom Gordon** (17)	48,270	29–27
57	June 5	@ Diamondbacks	4–3	**Aaron Fultz** (1–0)	Brandon Lyon (1–1)	**Tom Gordon** (18)	20,647	30–27
58	June 6	@ Diamondbacks	10–1	**Cole Hamels** (1–0)	Russ Ortiz (0–4)	None	22,677	31–27
59	June 7	@ Diamondbacks	7–3	**Ryan Madson** (6–3)	Dustin Nippert (0–1)	None	21,052	32–27
60	June 8	@ Nationals	2–5	Michael O'Connor (3–3)	**Eude Brito** (0–2)	Chad Cordero (12)	24,669	32–28
61	June 9	@ Nationals	8–9 (12)	Chad Cordero (2–1)	**Clay Condrey** (1–1)	None	24,751	32–29
62	June 10	@ Nationals	6–2	**Geoff Geary** (4–0)	Liván Hernández (5–6)	None	32,089	33–29
63	June 11	@ Nationals	0–6	Shawn Hill (1–1)	**Cole Hamels** (1–1)	None	30,583	33–30
64	June 13	Mets	7–9	Chad Bradford (3–2)	**Ryan Madson** (6–4)	Billy Wagner (13)	37,964	33–31
65	June 14	Mets	3–9	Darren Oliver (3–0)	**Brett Myers** (4–3)	None	38,811	33–32
66	June 15	Mets	4–5	Steve Trachsel (4–4)	**Cory Lidle** (4–6)	Billy Wagner (14)	45,102	33–33
67	June 16	Devil Rays	4–10	James Shields (3–0)	**Cole Hamels** (1–2)	None	31,042	33–34
68	June 17	Devil Rays	2–7	Scott Kazmir (8–4)	**Scott Mathieson** (0–1)	None	35,939	33–35
69	June 18	Devil Rays	8–5	**Ryan Madson** (7–4)	Seth McClung (2–10)	**Tom Gordon** (19)	42,658	34–35
70	June 19	Yankees	4–2	**Brett Myers** (5–3)	Randy Johnson (8–6)	**Tom Gordon** (20)	44,747	35–35
71	June 20	Yankees	7–9	T. J. Beam (1–0)	**Arthur Rhodes** (0–2)	Mariano Rivera (14)	44,775	35–36
72	June 21	Yankees	0–5	Jaret Wright (4–4)	**Cole Hamels** (1–3)	None	45,111	35–37
73	June 23	@ Red Sox	2–10	Josh Beckett (9–3)	**Ryan Madson** (7–5)	None	35,948	35–38
74	June 24	@ Red Sox	3–5 (10)	Jonathan Papelbon (2–1)	**Tom Gordon** (2–3)	None	35,564	35–39
–	June 25	@ Red Sox	Postponed (rain); Makeup: June 26					
75	June 26	@ Red Sox	7–8 (12)	Craig Hansen (1–0)	**Clay Condrey** (1–2)	None	36,459	35–40
–	June 27	@ Orioles	Postponed (rain); Makeup: June 28 as a day-night double-header					
76	June 28 (1)	@ Orioles	4–7	Érik Bédard (8–6)	**Cole Hamels** (1–4)	Chris Ray (20)	20,633	35–41
77	June 28 (2)	@ Orioles	5–12	Kris Benson (9–5)	**Scott Mathieson** (0–2)	None	26,228	35–42
78	June 29	@ Orioles	4–0	**Ryan Madson** (8–5)	Rodrigo López (5–9)	**Tom Gordon** (21)	31,038	36–42
79	June 30	@ Blue Jays	1–8	Casey Janssen (6–6)	**Adam Bernero** (0–1)	None	17,311	36–43

July (13–12)

#	Date	Opponent	Score	Win	Loss	Save	Attendance	Record
80	July 1	@ Blue Jays	2–5	Scott Downs (2–0)	**Cory Lidle** (4–7)	B. J. Ryan (22)	24,248	36–44
81	July 2	@ Blue Jays	11–6	**Geoff Geary** (5–0)	A. J. Burnett (1–2)	None	26,177	37–44
82	July 4	Padres	6–5	**Tom Gordon** (3–3)	Cla Meredith (1–1)	None	29,192	38–44
83	July 5	Padres	3–6	Scott Linebrink (6–2)	**Arthur Rhodes** (0–3)	Trevor Hoffman (21)	40,230	38–45
84	July 6	Padres	3–5	Chan Ho Park (6–4)	**Ryan Madson** (8–6)	Trevor Hoffman (22)	30,261	38–46
85	July 7	Pirates	2–3	Ian Snell (8–6)	**Jon Lieber** (3–6)	Michael Gonzalez (13)	45,025	38–47
86	July 8	Pirates	6–2	**Cory Lidle** (5–7)	Paul Maholm (3–8)	None	37,462	39–47
87	July 9	Pirates	8–3	**Cole Hamels** (2–4)	Zach Duke (5–8)	None	32,527	40–47
–	July 11	**2006 Major League Baseball All-Star Game at PNC Park in Pittsburgh**						
88	July 14	@ Giants	3–5	Matt Morris (8–7)	**Jon Lieber** (3–7)	Armando Benítez (11)	38,009	40–48
89	July 15	@ Giants	14–6	**Cory Lidle** (6–7)	Noah Lowry (4–6)	None	41,401	41–48
90	July 16	@ Giants	6–2	**Brett Myers** (6–3)	Steve Kline (2–2)	None	38,241	42–48
91	July 17	@ Padres	6–8	Alan Embree (3–2)	**Rhéal Cormier** (2–2)	Trevor Hoffman (25)	25,936	42–49
92	July 18	@ Padres	6–10	Clay Hensley (6–7)	**Ryan Madson** (8–7)	None	33,327	42–50
93	July 19	@ Padres	5–4	**Geoff Geary** (6–0)	Trevor Hoffman (0–2)	**Tom Gordon** (22)	32,101	43–50
94	July 21	Braves	6–5	**Cory Lidle** (7–7)	Ken Ray (1–1)	**Tom Gordon** (23)	32,833	44–50
–	July 22	Braves	Postponed (rain); Makeup: September 2 as a day-night double-header					
95	July 23	Braves	1–5	Macay McBride (2–1)	**Brett Myers** (6–4)	None	31,664	44–51
96	July 24	Braves	8–10	Tim Hudson (8–8)	**Cole Hamels** (2–5)	Bob Wickman (16)	28,864	44–52
97	July 25	Diamondbacks	5–6 (11)	Tony Peña (1–0)	**Ryan Franklin** (1–5)	None	24,499	44–53
98	July 26	Diamondbacks	6–4	**Jon Lieber** (4–7)	Brandon Webb (11–4)	**Tom Gordon** (24)	45,459	45–53
99	July 27	Diamondbacks	5–2	**Cory Lidle** (8–7)	Claudio Vargas (8–7)	**Tom Gordon** (25)	31,752	46–53
100	July 28	Marlins	1–4	Ricky Nolasco (9–6)	**Brett Myers** (6–5)	None	25,105	46–54
101	July 29	Marlins	12–3	**Cole Hamels** (3–5)	Dontrelle Willis (6–8)	None	31,072	47–54
102	July 30 (1)	Marlins	11–5	**Aaron Fultz** (2–0)	Aníbal Sánchez (4–1)	None	31,375	48–54
103	July 30 (2)	Marlins	9–2	**Ryan Madson** (9–7)	Brian Moehler (5–8)	None	23,604	49–54
104	July 31	Marlins	2–15	Josh Johnson (9–5)	**Jon Lieber** (4–8)	None	20,956	49–55

August (18–11)

#	Date	Opponent	Score	Win	Loss	Save	Attendance	Record
105	August 1	@ Cardinals	5–3	**Scott Mathieson** (1–2)	Jeff Suppan (8–6)	**Tom Gordon** (26)	42,773	50–55
106	August 2	@ Cardinals	16–8	**Brett Myers** (7–5)	Jeff Weaver (4–12)	None (33)	42,598	51–55
107	August 3	@ Cardinals	8–1	**Cole Hamels** (4–5)	Jason Marquis (12–9)	None (34)	42,461	52–55
108	August 4	@ Mets	5–3	**Ryan Madson** (10–7)	Darren Oliver (4–1)	**Tom Gordon** (27)	43,209	53–55
109	August 5	@ Mets	3–4	Tom Glavine (12–4)	**Jon Lieber** (4–9)	Billy Wagner (24)	44,829	53–56
110	August 6	@ Mets	1–8	John Maine (2–3)	**Scott Mathieson** (1–3)	None	39,144	53–57
111	August 7	@ Braves	9–6	**Brett Myers** (8–5)	Horacio Ramírez (5–5)	None	26,177	54–57
112	August 8	@ Braves	1–3	Tim Hudson (9–10)	**Cole Hamels** (4–6)	Bob Wickman (21)	30,714	54–58
113	August 9	@ Braves	9–3	**Rick White** (2–0)	Tyler Yates (1–3)	None	27,222	55–58
114	August 11	Reds	6–5 (14)	**Aaron Fultz** (3–0)	Elizardo Ramírez (4–9)	None	41,461	56–58
115	August 12	Reds	7–9	Chris Michalak (1–0)	**Tom Gordon** (3–4)	Eddie Guardado (13)	39,553	56–59
116	August 13	Reds	5–7 (11)	Bill Bray (3–2)	**Ryan Madson** (10–8)	None	37,677	56–60
117	August 14	Mets	13–0	**Cole Hamels** (5–6)	Pedro Martínez (9–5)	None	36,888	57–60
118	August 15	Mets	11–4	**Randy Wolf** (1–0)	Orlando Hernández (8–9)	None	40,283	58–60
119	August 16	Mets	3–0	**Jon Lieber** (5–9)	Tom Glavine (12–6)	None	42,156	59–60
120	August 17	Mets	2–7	John Maine (3–3)	**Scott Mathieson** (1–4)	None	45,775	59–61
121	August 18	Nationals	4–6	Tony Armas Jr. (8–8)	**Brett Myers** (8–6)	Chad Cordero (23)	30,123	59–62
122	August 19	Nationals	11–2	**Cole Hamels** (6–6)	Ramón Ortiz (9–11)	None	34,881	60–62
123	August 20	Nationals	12–10	**Randy Wolf** (2–0)	Pedro Astacio (3–3)	**Arthur Rhodes** (2)	36,023	61–62
124	August 21	@ Cubs	6–5	**Jon Lieber** (6–9)	Rich Hill (3–6)	**Arthur Rhodes** (3)	38,950	62–62
125	August 22	@ Cubs	6–3	**Jamie Moyer** (7–12)	Ryan O'Malley (1–1)	**Ryan Madson** (1)	38,770	63–62
126	August 23	@ Cubs	2–1	**Brett Myers** (9–6)	Bob Howry (3–4)	**Geoff Geary** (1)	39,470	64–62
127	August 24	@ Cubs	2–11	Carlos Zambrano (14–5)	**Cole Hamels** (6–7)	None	39,464	64–63
128	August 25	@ Mets	4–3	**Randy Wolf** (3–0)	Brian Bannister (2–1)	**Ryan Madson** (2)	41,707	65–63
129	August 26	@ Mets	5–11	Pedro Feliciano (6–2)	**Rick White** (2–1)	None	47,019	65–64
–	August 27	@ Mets	Postponed (rain); Makeup: August 28					
130	August 28	@ Mets	3–8	John Maine (4–3)	**Jamie Moyer** (7–13)	None	45,868	65–65
131	August 29	@ Nationals	10–6	**Brett Myers** (10–6)	Tony Armas Jr. (8–10)	**Arthur Rhodes** (4)	25,735	66–65
132	August 30	@ Nationals	5–1	**Cole Hamels** (7–7)	Ramón Ortiz (9–12)	None	24,438	67–65
133	August 31	@ Nationals	5–6 (10)	Ryan Wagner (2–2)	**Aaron Fultz** (3–1)	None	22,221	67–66

September (18–10)

#	Date	Opponent	Score	Win	Loss	Save	Attendance	Record
–	September 1	Braves	Postponed (rain); Makeup: September 3 as a traditional double-header					
134	September 2 (1)	Braves	3–4	Tyler Yates (2–4)	**Arthur Rhodes** (0–4)	Bob Wickman (26)	31,717	67–67
135	September 2 (2)	Braves	16–4	**Eude Brito** (1–2)	Kyle Davies (2–4)	None ()	28,600	68–67
136	September 3 (1)	Braves	8–7	**Geoff Geary** (7–0)	Bob Wickman (1–5)	None ()	see 2nd game	69–67
137	September 3 (2)	Braves	1–3 (11)	Chad Paronto (2–2)	**Geoff Geary** (7–1)	Bob Wickman (27)	37,044	69–68
138	September 4	Astros	3–2 (10)	**Rick White** (3–1)	Dave Borkowski (1–2)	None	44,674	70–68
–	September 5	Astros	Postponed (rain); Makeup: September 25					
139	September 6	Astros	3–5	Dan Wheeler (2–5)	**Ryan Madson** (10–9)	Brad Lidge (30)	33,521	70–69
140	September 7	@ Marlins	14–8	**Jon Lieber** (7–9)	Josh Johnson (12–7)	None	12,712	71–69
141	September 8	@ Marlins	3–2	**Jamie Moyer** (8–13)	Scott Olsen (12–8)	**Tom Gordon** (28)	21,432	72–69
142	September 9	@ Marlins	3–4 (10)	Chris Resop (1–0)	**Arthur Rhodes** (0–5)	None	27,444	72–70
143	September 10	@ Marlins	0–3	Dontrelle Willis (10–11)	**Cole Hamels** (7–8)	None	20,308	72–71
–	September 12	@ Braves	Postponed (rain); Makeup: September 13 as a traditional double-header					
144	September 13 (1)	@ Braves	6–5	**Rick White** (4–1)	Chad Paronto (2–3)	**Tom Gordon** (29)	see 2nd game	73–71
145	September 13 (2)	@ Braves	7–2	**Jon Lieber** (8–9)	Tim Hudson (12–11)	None	22,239	74–71
146	September 14	@ Braves	1–4	Chuck James (10–3)	**Jamie Moyer** (8–14)	Bob Wickman (29)	19,346	74–72
147	September 15	@ Astros	4–3	**Brett Myers** (11–6)	Roger Clemens (6–5)	**Tom Gordon** (30)	41,432	75–72
148	September 16	@ Astros	7–2	**Cole Hamels** (8–8)	Jason Hirsh (3–4)	None	41,002	76–72
149	September 17	@ Astros	6–4	**Randy Wolf** (4–0)	Wandy Rodríguez (9–10)	**Tom Gordon** (31)	41,170	77–72
150	September 18	Cubs	6–11	Michael Wuertz (3–1)	**Jon Lieber** (8–10)	None	31,101	77–73
151	September 19	Cubs	4–1	**Jamie Moyer** (9–14)	Wade Miller (0–2)	**Tom Gordon** (32)	31,892	78–73
152	September 20	Cubs	6–2	**Brett Myers** (12–6)	Les Walrond (0–1)	None	35,269	79–73
153	September 22	Marlins	5–2	**Cole Hamels** (9–8)	Ricky Nolasco (11–10)	**Tom Gordon** (33)	44,737	80–73
154	September 23	Marlins	8–6	**Jon Lieber** (9–10)	Brian Moehler (7–10)	None	37,055	81–73
155	September 24	Marlins	10–7	**Jamie Moyer** (10–14)	Scott Olsen (12–9)	None	44,772	82–73
156	September 25	Astros	4–5	Dave Borkowski (3–2)	**Matt Smith** (0–1)	Dan Wheeler (8)	44,688	82–74
157	September 26	@ Nationals	3–4	Ramón Ortiz (11–15)	**Brett Myers** (12–7)	Chad Cordero (29)	18,960	82–75
158	September 27	@ Nationals	8–7 (14)	**Clay Condrey** (2–2)	Jason Bergmann (0–2)	**Fabio Castro** (1)	21,809	83–75
159	September 28	@ Nationals	1–3	Billy Traber (4–3)	**Jon Lieber** (9–11)	Jon Rauch (2)	18,324	83–76
160	September 29	@ Marlins	14–2	**Jamie Moyer** (11–14)	Brian Moehler (7–11)	None	23,417	84–76
161	September 30	@ Marlins	4–3	**Ryan Madson** (11–9)	Scott Olsen (12–10)	**Tom Gordon** (34)	20,992	85–76

October (0–1)

#	Date	Opponent	Score	Win	Loss	Save	Attendance	Record
162	October 1	@ Marlins	2–3 (11)	Matt Herges (2–3)	**Fabio Castro** (0–1)	None	36,768	85–77

=== Roster ===
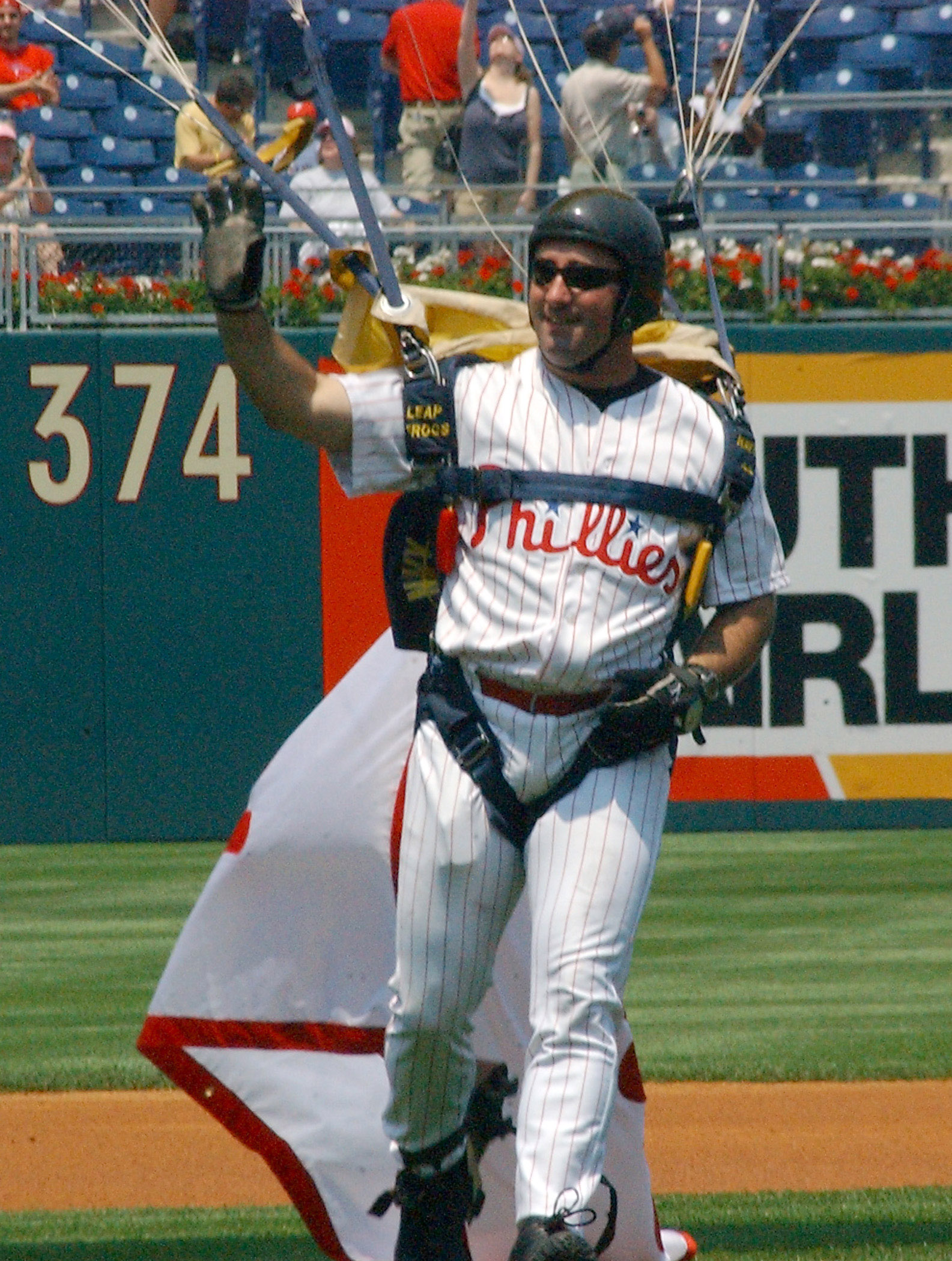
A United States Navy Parachute Team member lands on the field at Citizens Bank Park during the 2006 season.

2006 Philadelphia Phillies
**Roster**
**Pitchers**: 50 Adam Bernero; 58 Eude Brito; 52 Fabio Castro; 55 Clay Condrey; 37 Rhéal Cormier; 34 Gavin Floyd; 23 Ryan Franklin; 46 Aaron Fultz; 56 Geoff Geary; 45 Tom Gordon; 35 Cole Hamels; 30 Cory Lidle; 21 Jon Lieber; 63 Ryan Madson; 47 Scott Mathieson; 50 Jamie Moyer; 39 Brett Myers; 22 Arthur Rhodes; 48 Brian Sanches; 44 Julio Santana; 40 Matt Smith; 00 Rick White; 43 Randy Wolf	**Catchers**: 27 Chris Coste; 13 Sal Fasano; 24 Mike Lieberthal; 51 Carlos Ruiz; **Infielders**: 25 David Bell; 8 Alex Gonzalez; 8 José Hernández; 6 Ryan Howard; 3 Abraham Núñez; 11 Jimmy Rollins; 4 Danny Sandoval; 23 Joe Thurston; 26 Chase Utley	**Outfielders**: 53 Bobby Abreu; 9 Michael Bourn; 5 Pat Burrell; 19 Jeff Conine; 2 David Dellucci; 29 Chris Roberson; 33 Aaron Rowand; 18 Shane Victorino; **Other batters**: 12 Randall Simon	**Manager**: 41 Charlie Manuel; **Coaches**: 23 Marc Bombard (first base); 16 Bill Dancy (third base); 28 Rich Dubee (pitching); 31 Ramon Henderson (bullpen); 15 Milt Thompson (hitting); 19 Gary Varsho (bench)

== Awards ==
Ryan Howard won the Players Choice Awards MLB Player of the Year and NL Outstanding Player from his fellow players, the Sporting News Player of the Year Award, the NL Most Valuable Player Award, the NLBM Oscar Charleston Legacy Award (NL MVP), the Babe Ruth Home Run Award (in MLB), the NLBM Josh Gibson Legacy Award (NL home-run leader), the John Wanamaker Athletic Award from the Philadelphia Sports Congress (in summer 2007; for the 2006 calendar year), and the Pride of Philadelphia Award from the Philadelphia Sports Hall of Fame.

The NL Silver Slugger Award was won by Howard (first base) and Chase Utley (second base). The Philadelphia chapter of the Baseball Writers' Association of America (BBWAA) presented its annual franchise awards to Ryan Howard ("Mike Schmidt Most Valuable Player Award"), Tom Gordon ("Steve Carlton Most Valuable Pitcher Award"), Chris Coste ("Dallas Green Special Achievement Award"), and Mike Lieberthal ("Tug McGraw Good Guy Award"). Coste also received the Philadelphia Sports Writers Association's "Good Guy Award".

== Player stats ==
=== Batting ===
==== Starters by position ====
Note: Pos = Position; G = Games played; AB = At bats; H = Hits; Avg. = Batting average; HR = Home runs; RBI = Runs batted in

Pos	Player	G	AB	H	Avg.	HR	RBI
C	Mike Lieberthal	67	209	57	.273	9	36
1B	Ryan Howard	159	581	182	.313	58	149
2B	Chase Utley	160	658	203	.309	32	102
SS	Jimmy Rollins	158	689	191	.277	25	83
3B	David Bell	92	324	90	.278	6	34
LF	Pat Burrell	144	462	119	.258	29	95
CF	Aaron Rowand	109	405	106	.262	12	47
RF	Bobby Abreu	98	339	94	.277	8	65

==== Other batters ====
Note: G = Games played; AB = At bats; H = Hits; Avg. = Batting average; HR = Home runs; RBI = Runs batted in

Player	G	AB	H	Avg.	HR	RBI
Shane Victorino	153	415	119	.287	6	46
Abraham Núñez	123	322	68	.211	2	32
David Dellucci	132	264	77	.292	13	39
Chris Coste	65	198	65	.328	7	32
Sal Fasano	50	140	34	.243	4	10
Jeff Conine	28	100	28	.280	1	17
Carlos Ruiz	27	69	18	.261	3	10
Chris Roberson	57	41	8	.195	0	1
Danny Sandoval	28	38	8	.211	0	4
Alex Gonzalez	20	36	4	.111	0	1
José Hernández	18	32	8	.250	1	7
Randall Simon	23	21	5	.238	0	2
Joe Thurston	18	18	4	.222	0	0
Michael Bourn	17	8	1	.125	0	0

=== Pitching ===
==== Starting pitchers ====
Note: G = Games pitched; IP = Innings pitched; W = Wins; L = Losses; ERA = Earned run average; SO = Strikeouts

Player	G	IP	W	L	ERA	SO
Brett Myers	31	198.0	12	7	3.91	189
Jon Lieber	27	168.0	9	11	4.93	100
Cole Hamels	23	132.1	9	8	4.08	145
Cory Lidle	21	125.1	8	7	4.74	98
Randy Wolf	12	56.2	4	0	5.56	44
Gavin Floyd	11	54.1	4	3	7.29	34
Jamie Moyer	8	51.1	5	2	4.03	26
Scott Mathieson	9	37.1	1	4	7.47	28
Adam Bernero	1	2.0	0	1	36.00	0

==== Other pitchers ====
Note: G = Games pitched; IP = Innings pitched; W = Wins; L = Losses; ERA = Earned run average; SO = Strikeouts

Player	G	IP	W	L	ERA	SO
Ryan Madson	50	134.1	11	9	5.69	99
Eude Brito	5	18.1	1	2	7.36	9

==== Relief pitchers ====
Note: G = Games pitched; W = Wins; L = Losses; SV = Saves; ERA = Earned run average; SO = Strikeouts

Player	G	W	L	SV	ERA	SO
Tom Gordon	59	3	4	34	3.34	68
Geoff Geary	81	7	1	1	2.96	60
Aaron Fultz	66	3	1	0	4.54	62
Arthur Rhodes	55	0	5	4	5.32	48
Ryan Franklin	46	1	5	0	4.58	25
Rhéal Cormier	43	2	2	0	1.59	13
Rick White	38	3	1	0	4.34	23
Clay Condrey	21	2	2	0	3.14	16
Brian Sanches	18	0	0	0	5.91	22
Fabio Castro	16	0	1	1	1.54	13
Matt Smith	14	0	1	0	2.08	12
Julio Santana	7	0	0	0	7.56	4

== Farm system ==
Level	Team	League	Manager
AAA	Scranton/Wilkes-Barre; Red Barons	International League	John Russell
AA	Reading Phillies	Eastern League	P. J. Forbes
A	Clearwater Threshers	Florida State League	Greg Legg
A	Lakewood BlueClaws	South Atlantic League	Dave Huppert
A-Short Season	Batavia Muckdogs	New York–Penn League	Steve Roadcap
Rookie	GCL Phillies	Gulf Coast League	Jim Morrison

LEAGUE CHAMPIONS: Lakewood
