= Kevin Barry (baseball) =

American baseball player (born 1978)

- Pitcher
- Born: August 18, 1978 (age 47); Princeton Junction, New Jersey, U.S.
- Batted: Right Threw: Right

MLB debut
- June 26, 2006, for the Atlanta Braves

Last MLB appearance
- May 13, 2007, for the Atlanta Braves

MLB statistics
- Win–loss record: 1–1
- Earned run average: 6.83
- Strikeouts: 23
- Stats at Baseball Reference

Teams
- Atlanta Braves (2006–2007)

Kevin Thomas Barry (born August 18, 1978) is an American former right-handed pitcher for the Atlanta Braves and current area scout for the Braves. Additionally, Barry is currently employed as a police officer for Kinmundy, Illinois.

Barry grew up in the Princeton Junction section of West Windsor Township, New Jersey and is a graduate of West Windsor-Plainsboro High School South.

He was drafted by the Braves in the 14th round of the 2001 draft. He has played with the Myrtle Beach Pelicans and the Richmond Braves. Barry was one of two pitchers (Chuck James being the other) called up from the Braves farm system after the release of Mike Remlinger.

He made his major league debut on June 26, 2006, against the New York Yankees and subsequently and surprisingly struck out Jason Giambi.

Barry is currently working for the Atlanta Braves Organization as an area scout. He has held this role since 2009.
