= Scott Mathieson =

Canadian baseball player (born 1984)

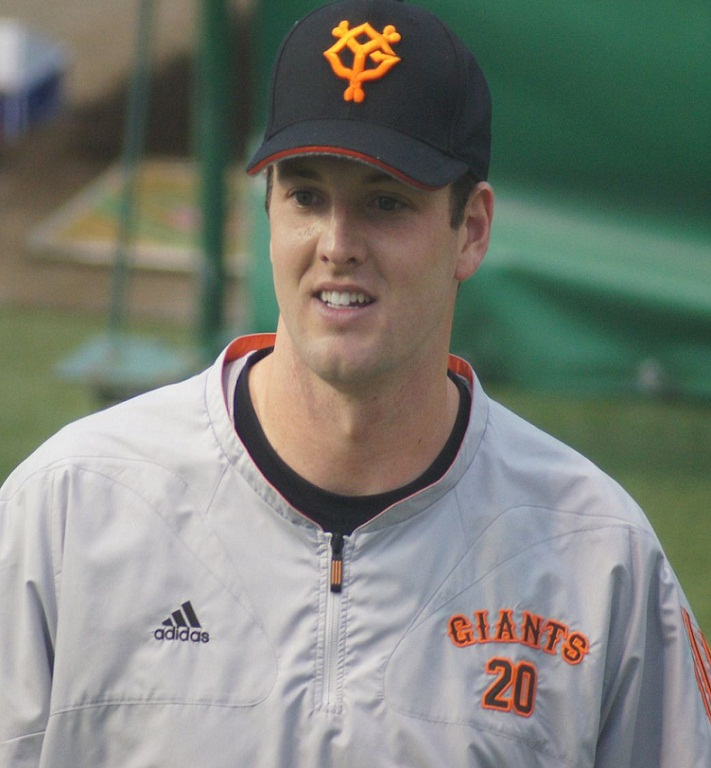
- Mathieson with the Yomiuri Giants
- Pitcher
- Born: February 27, 1984 (age 42); Vancouver, British Columbia, Canada
- Batted: Right Threw: Right

Professional debut
- MLB: June 12, 2006, for the Philadelphia Phillies
- NPB: April 18, 2012, for the Yomiuri Giants

Last appearance
- MLB: July 5, 2011, for the Philadelphia Phillies
- NPB: October 19, 2019, for the Yomiuri Giants

MLB statistics
- Win–loss record: 1–4
- Earned run average: 6.75
- Strikeouts: 34

NPB statistics
- Win–loss record: 27–29
- Earned run average: 2.46
- Strikeouts: 492
- Saves: 54
- Stats at Baseball Reference

Teams
- Philadelphia Phillies (2006, 2010–2011); Yomiuri Giants (2012–2019)

Career highlights and awards
- 2× Central League Middle Reliever of the Year (2013, 2016); Japan Series champion (2012)

Scott William Mathieson (born February 27, 1984) is a Canadian former professional baseball pitcher. He played in Major League Baseball (MLB) for the Philadelphia Phillies and in Nippon Professional Baseball (NPB) for the Yomiuri Giants.

== Career ==
=== Philadelphia Phillies ===
While playing for the Langley Blaze of the B.C. Premier Baseball League, Mathieson was drafted in the 17th round of the 2002 Major League Baseball draft – 509th overall – by the Phillies. He made his professional debut in the Gulf Coast League (GCL), going 0–2 with an earned run average of 5.40 in seven games. In 2003, he went 2–7 with a 5.52 ERA in the GCL. That year, he also pitched six perfect innings in one game for the Batavia Muckdogs of the New York–Penn League, including 7 strikeouts. In 2004, he pitched for the Lakewood BlueClaws of the South Atlantic League, going 8–9 with an ERA of 4.32 and 112 strikeouts. In 2005, he continued to show improvement. Although he went 3–8 for the Clearwater Threshers of the FSL, he had an ERA of 4.14, 118 strikeouts, and only 34 walks in 121 2/3 innings. During the season, he also pitched in the All-Star Futures Game for the World team. After the season, he was named by Baseball America as the Phillies' fourth-best prospect and the organization's best right-handed pitching prospect.

Mathieson made his MLB debut June 17, 2006, losing to the Tampa Bay Devil Rays, 7–2. Matheison suffered an elbow injury September 2 that required Tommy John surgery.

Mathieson began a rehabilitation program late in the 2007 season, but removed himself from a game August 31 while pitching for Double-A Reading when he felt "a strange sensation in his elbow." The Phillies announced September 4 that Mathieson would not return during 2007 due to inflammation of the ulnar nerve. Mathieson was scheduled to play in the 2007 Arizona Fall League with the Peoria Saguaros, but didn't.

As of 2009, Mathieson was pitching for the GCL Phillies in his effort to return to the major leagues.

On June 17, 2010, Mathieson was recalled from the Lehigh Valley IronPigs to the Philadelphia Phillies, where he remained for several weeks. He also spent parts of the 2011 season with the club in addition to his time with Lehigh Valley.

In November 2011, Mathieson was released from the Phillies to pursue pitching opportunities in Asia.

=== Yomiuri Giants ===
On December 2, 2011, he signed with the Yomiuri Giants of the Nippon Professional Baseball (NPB).

With the conclusion of the 2016 NPB season, his fifth year in Japan with the Yomiuri Giants, Mathieson had appeared in 300 games as a relief pitcher, compiling a 21–20 record with 2.32 ERA and 43 saves. He has 353 strikeouts and a 1.08 WHIP overall in NPB.

Mathieson announced the end of his professional playing career at the conclusion of the 2019 season.

== International career ==
Mathieson pitched for the Canada national baseball team at the 2006 World Baseball Classic, 2013 World Baseball Classic, 2017 World Baseball Classic, 2019 WBSC Premier12, and 2023 World Baseball Classic.
