= Kyle Davies (baseball) =

American baseball pitcher (born 1983)

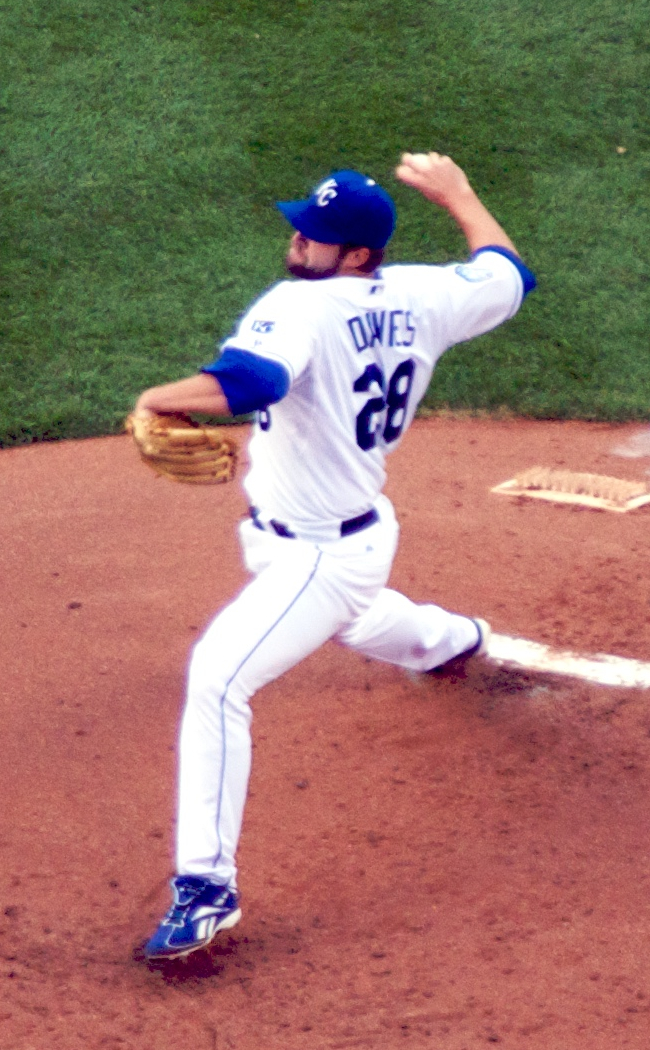
- Davies with the Kansas City Royals
- Pitcher
- Born: September 9, 1983 (age 43); Decatur, Georgia, U.S.
- Batted: Right Threw: Right

Professional debut
- MLB: May 21, 2005, for the Atlanta Braves
- NPB: March 31, 2016, for the Tokyo Yakult Swallows

Last appearance
- MLB: April 12, 2015, for the New York Yankees
- NPB: September 13, 2016, for the Tokyo Yakult Swallows

MLB statistics
- Win–loss record: 43–65
- Earned run average: 5.57
- Strikeouts: 547

NPB statistics
- Win–loss record: 4–5
- Earned run average: 4.39
- Strikeouts: 64
- Stats at Baseball Reference

Teams
- Atlanta Braves (2005–2007); Kansas City Royals (2007–2011); New York Yankees (2015); Tokyo Yakult Swallows (2016)

Hiram Kyle Davies (born September 9, 1983) is an American former professional baseball pitcher. He played in Major League Baseball (MLB) for the Atlanta Braves and Kansas City Royals.

Davies grew up in Stockbridge, Georgia, and graduated from Stockbridge High School and signed right out of high school with the Braves. He made his MLB debut in 2005, and was traded to the Royals in 2007. Injuries prevented him from appearing in MLB after the 2011 season, until he pitched for the Yankees in 2015.

== Career ==
Davies attended Stockbridge High School in Stockbridge, Georgia. He was highly recruited by many major college programs, most notably Georgia Tech.

=== Atlanta Braves ===
The Atlanta Braves selected Davies in the fourth round (135th overall) of the 2001 Major League Baseball draft, and he signed with the Braves instead of attending college. He made his professional debut that season with the Gulf Coast League Braves, going 4–2 with a 2.25 earned run average (ERA) in 12 games (nine starts). Davies also made an additional start with the Single-A Macon Braves, in which he earned the win. He then spent 2002 with Macon and the Rookie-level Danville Braves, and posted a combined 5–4 record and a 3.72 ERA in 16 games (15 starts).

Davies was a member of the Single-A Rome Braves during their inaugural season, when they won the 2003 South Atlantic League championship. He went 8–8 with a 2.89 ERA and led the team in strikeouts (148) in his 27 starts. Davies reached Triple-A in 2004, and finished 13–3 with a 2.72 ERA in 26 games (25 starts) across three Braves affiliates. He also struck out 173 batters in 142 1/3 innings.

Davies was part of the group of rookie players nicknamed the "Baby Braves" that Atlanta called up from its minor league system during the 2005 season. When Braves pitchers John Thomson and Mike Hampton were both put on the disabled list with injuries, Davies was called up by the Braves on May 21, 2005. He made his Major League Baseball debut that night in a rainy game at Fenway Park in Boston, Massachusetts, and threw five shutout innings while striking out six in a win against the Boston Red Sox. Davies immediately made an impact, as he did not allow a run in three of his first four starts in the Major Leagues. When Thomson and Hampton returned to the pitching rotation in August, Davies was sent back to the minor leagues. He returned in September, and mostly pitched out of the bullpen for the rest of the season. In 21 games (14 starts), Davies went 7–6 with a 4.93 ERA.

Davies began the 2006 season as a starter in Atlanta, after coming to spring training as a probable Triple-A starter. On May 15, 2006, Davies suffered an injury to his right groin while pitching against the Florida Marlins. He was later diagnosed with a torn groin muscle and underwent surgery several days later. As a result of the injury, Davies was put on the disabled list and missed 10 weeks of the season. He made only 14 starts in 2006, finishing with a 3–7 record and a disappointing ERA of 8.38.

Out of spring training in 2007, Davies was initially assigned to the Triple-A Richmond Braves of the International League. However, due to the injury of Lance Cormier at the end of spring training, he was promoted on April 5 to fill Cormier's spot. Cormier's inability to return to form after rehabilitating and coming off the DL, coupled with the Braves losing Mike Hampton to season ending surgery, allowed Davies' role on the pitching staff to cease being a fill-in role. However, in 17 starts, Davies had a terrible time establishing any pattern of reliability and consistency, posting a record of 4–8 with a 5.76 ERA. In a start on July 16 versus the Cincinnati Reds, Davies threw just 22 pitches and did not record an out before being taken out of the game. Consequently, Davies was optioned to Richmond on July 19 as rookie Jo-Jo Reyes assumed his spot in the rotation.

=== Kansas City Royals ===
On July 31, 2007, Davies was traded to the Kansas City Royals in exchange for pitcher Octavio Dotel. On August 4, Davies made his Royals debut, going three innings and giving up five earned runs. He also gave up Alex Rodriguez's 500th career home run in the first inning. But on August 9, he was able to bounce back with 6 2/3 scoreless innings against the Minnesota Twins, giving up only three hits and striking out five. The Royals won the game by the score of 1–0. Davies made 11 starts with the Royals after the trade, going 3–7 with a 6.66 ERA.

After competing for a spot in Kansas City's starting rotation during Spring Training in 2008, Davies was optioned to the Triple-A Omaha Royals on March 26. He was recalled on May 29, taking the rotation spot of Brett Tomko. In his season debut on May 31, Davies threw five innings, allowing just one run in a 4–2 win over the Cleveland Indians, snapping the Royals' 12-game losing streak. In 21 starts with the Royals, Davies went 9–7 with a 4.06 ERA.

On January 9, 2009, Davies signed a one-year contract with the Royals to avoid salary arbitration. He struggled with inconsistency in 2009, finishing with an 8–9 record and an ERA of 5.27 in 22 starts.

On December 13, 2009, the Royals re-signed Davies to another one-year contract to avoid arbitration. He made 32 starts for the 2010 season, posting an 8–12 record and a 5.34 ERA.

On August 1, 2011, Davies was placed on the 15-day disabled list with right shoulder impingement. He was released on August 10, 2011, and cleared release waivers on August 12. At the time of his release, Davies was 1–9 with a 6.75 ERA in 13 starts.

=== Toronto Blue Jays ===
On August 20, 2011, Davies signed a minor league contract with the Toronto Blue Jays. He became a free agent following the season on November 2.

=== Minnesota Twins ===
On February 19, 2013, Davies signed a minor league contract with the Minnesota Twins. After missing April and half of May due to shoulder problems, Davies was assigned to the High-A Fort Myers Miracle, where he made his first start on May 15. After one additional start, he missed another month due to injury, making a rehab start with the GCL Twins before returning to Fort Myers, where he made three more starts. On July 23, Davies was promoted to the Double-A New Britain Rock Cats, where he made seven starts to finish the season. In 12 starts in 2013, Davies went 4–3 with a 3.41 ERA and four quality starts, striking out 47 in 58 innings. He elected free agency following the season on November 4.

=== Cleveland Indians ===
On February 12, 2014, Davies signed a minor league contract with the Cleveland Indians. He spent the season in the minor leagues, finishing with an 11–9 record and a 3.91 ERA in 26 starts for the Double-A Akron RubberDucks and Triple-A Columbus Clippers. He elected free agency following the season on November 2.

=== New York Yankees ===
On February 9, 2015, Davies signed a minor league contract with the New York Yankees. He was called up to the major leagues on April 12, 2015, and appeared in a game that night. He was designated for assignment by the Yankees the next day he cleared waivers and was sent outright to Triple-A Scranton/Wilkes-Barre RailRiders on April 15. He elected free agency following the season on October 7.

=== Tokyo Yakult Swallows ===
On December 19, 2015, Davies signed with the Tokyo Yakult Swallows of Nippon Professional Baseball. He became a free agent following the season.

=== Somerset Patriots ===
After sitting out the 2017 season, Davies signed with the Somerset Patriots of the Atlantic League of Professional Baseball on May 7, 2018. He became a free agent following the 2018 season. Davies went 6–8 with a 4.50 ERA in 21 starts, while also recording 90 strikeouts and one complete game in 104 innings.

=== Lancaster Barnstormers ===
On March 15, 2019, Davies signed with the Lancaster Barnstormers of the Atlantic League of Professional Baseball. In 15 starts, he went 4–9 with a 4.44 ERA and 68 strikeouts.

== Personal life ==
During the offseason, Davies works for his father's construction company. He currently resides in McDonough, Georgia.

Kyle's younger brother Jake played baseball at Georgia Tech from 2009 to 2012. Jake was drafted by the Boston Red Sox in the 21st round (661st overall) of the 2012 Major League Baseball draft. He reached the Single–A New York–Penn League later that year, but was released in 2013.

Davies was arrested in St. Petersburg, Florida after a baseball game on August 8, 2011, for disorderly intoxication.

Davies is cousins and close personal friends with Nicholas Griswold.
