= Ken Ray =

American baseball player (born 1974)

- Relief pitcher
- Born: November 27, 1974 (age 51); Atlanta, Georgia, U.S.
- Batted: Right Threw: Right

Professional debut
- MLB: July 10, 1999, for the Kansas City Royals
- KBO: June 14, 2008, for the SK Wyverns
- CPBL: March 23, 2010, for the La New Bears
- NPB: July 17, 2013, for the Tohoku Rakuten Golden Eagles

Last appearance
- MLB: September 30, 2006, for the Atlanta Braves
- KBO: July 10, 2008, for the SK Wyverns
- CPBL: 2017, for the Lamigo Monkeys
- NPB: 2016, for the Tohoku Rakuten Golden Eagles

MLB statistics
- Win–loss record: 2–1
- Earned run average: 5.13
- Strikeouts: 50

KBO statistics
- Win–loss record: 1–2
- Earned run average: 6.64
- Strikeouts: 11

CPBL statistics
- Win–loss record: 36–30
- Earned run average: 2.78
- Strikeouts: 428

NPB statistics
- Win–loss record: 5–10
- Earned run average: 4.13
- Strikeouts: 98
- Stats at Baseball Reference

Teams
- Kansas City Royals (1999); Atlanta Braves (2006); SK Wyverns (2008); La New Bears / Lamigo Monkeys (2010–2012); Tohoku Rakuten Golden Eagles (2013); Lamigo Monkeys (2014); Tohoku Rakuten Golden Eagles (2015–2016)

Career highlights and awards
- Japan Series champion (2013); 2x Taiwan Series champion (2012, 2014)

Kenneth Alan Ray (born November 27, 1974) is an American former professional baseball pitcher who played for the Atlanta Braves and Kansas City Royals. Ray made his MLB debut on July 10, 1999, for the Royals.

== Early career ==
After briefly pitching for the Royals in 1999, Ray spent years battling arm problems while trying to work his way back onto a major league roster.

== Back in the majors ==
He made a meteoric rise from 2005 to 2006. In 2005, Ray started the season with the independent North Shore Spirit of the Can-Am League before being acquired by the Atlanta Braves organization. He spent the remainder of the season with the Triple-A Richmond Braves.

On April 6, 2006, following an injury to starter Horacio Ramírez, Ray was called up from the Richmond Braves, Atlanta's Triple-A affiliate. In his first appearance for Atlanta in 2006, he struck out Barry Bonds on 3 pitches.

He was claimed off waivers by the Royals in the 2006 offseason. Ray began the 2007 season in Triple-A with the Omaha Royals. He was released on August 18, 2007. On August 30, he was signed by the Triple-A Nashville Sounds. Ray began 2008 pitching for the Triple-A Potros de Tijuana of the Mexican League where he held a 6-3 record and a 3.65 ERA. Ray signed with the SK Wyverns of the Korea Baseball Organization where he finished 2008.

On May 27, 2009, Ray was signed by the Cleveland Indians, and assigned to their AAA affiliate Columbus Clippers.

By March, 2010, Ray was pitching for the La New Bears in the Chinese Professional Baseball League. In 2010 his ERA of 2.32 helped earn him a renewal, and Ray continued to play for the La New Bears (now the Lamigo Monkeys) through 2012 and again in 2014. In 2013 he played in Mexico and then for Nippon Professional Baseball's Rakuten Golden Eagles, for whom he played again in 2015 and 2016. In 2017 at the age of 42, Ray pitched for the Lamigo Monkeys' minor league team.
