= Óscar Villarreal (baseball) =

Mexican baseball player (born 1981)

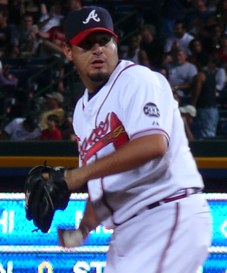
- Villarreal with the Braves in 2007
- Pitcher
- Born: November 22, 1981 (age 44); San Nicolás de los Garza, Nuevo León, Mexico
- Batted: Left Threw: Right

MLB debut
- March 31, 2003, for the Arizona Diamondbacks

Last MLB appearance
- July 1, 2008, for the Houston Astros

MLB statistics
- Win–loss record: 24–15
- Earned run average: 3.86
- Strikeouts: 236
- Stats at Baseball Reference

Teams
- Arizona Diamondbacks (2003–2005); Atlanta Braves (2006–2007); Houston Astros (2008)

Óscar Eduardo Villarreal (Spanish pronunciation: [ˈoskaɾ βiʎareˈal]; born November 22, 1981) is a Mexican former professional baseball pitcher. He played in Major League Baseball (MLB) with the Arizona Diamondbacks, Atlanta Braves, and Houston Astros.

== Professional career ==
=== Arizona Diamondbacks ===
Villarreal was signed by the Diamondbacks as an amateur free agent in 1998. The next year, he made his professional debut with the Rookie League team the AZL Diamondbacks of the Arizona League. In 1999, Villarreal placed second on the team in innings pitched (64.1), games started (11), and strikeouts (51).

Villarreal began the 2000 season with the Triple-A Tucson Sidewinders. After being demoted to the Single-A South Bend Silver Hawks, Villarreal went 1–0 with a 1.66 earned run average. He was sent back down to Tucson in the Rookie League shortly before being sent up to Single-A High Desert, where he finished the season. In High Desert, he went 0–1 with a 2.70 ERA.

Villarreal played the entire 2001 season with the Double-A El Paso Diablos, where he logged a 6–9 record with a 4.41 ERA and 108 strikeouts. He began 2003 in El Paso, where he compiled a 3.74 ERA with a 6–3 win–loss record. On July 11, Villarreal was sent back up to the Sidewinders, where he went 3–3 with a 4.36 ERA. In the season combined, Villarreal recorded a Minor League career high 125 K's (85 in El Paso, 40 in Tucson).

In 2003, Villarreal earned a spot on the D'backs roster. He made his debut on March 31, and led all MLB rookies in games pitched (86) and ERA (2.57). His 86 games pitched also set a new rookie record. He finished second in the league in games pitched to Paul Quantrill, and also tied Brandon Webb's Diamondbacks record for wins by a rookie. However, on June 5, Villarreal suffered an injury when a line drive off the bat of Frank Thomas hit him in the shin. He left the game and was out for 5 days. He returned to the team on June 10 against the Kansas City Royals. On June 23, Villarreal was hurt again. A line drive hit by Craig Biggio struck him in the chest, but he did not leave the game. Villarreal came back to pitch 15.1 scoreless innings in July, and on September 10, he broke the rookie record for games pitched when he appeared in his 79th game. During the season, right-handed hitters only hit .204 off Villarreal.

Villarreal missed most of 2004 due to a sore elbow, and later elbow surgery. He appeared on Opening Day against the Rockies, and did not allow any runs. In the month of April, he recorded 15 strikeouts in 12.1 innings, while only walking one batter. Villarreal was placed on the disabled list on May 10 with a strained right flexor. After playing on a rehab assignment with the Tucson Sidewinders in July, doctors took an MRI on Villarreal's elbow on August 6 and determined that he would need to undergo season-ending nerve transposition surgery.

Villarreal returned in 2005, and ended up having another season shortened by an arm injury. He started the year with Triple-A Tucson before being called back up to the bigs on April 9. He pitched 1.2 scoreless innings on April 9 and left the next game against the Los Angeles Dodgers with a sore right shoulder. Villarreal had strained his rotator cuff, and the injury landed him on the DL until September 2. In his first game back in the majors, Villarreal surrendered a home run. He won a game on September 17, which was his first big-league victory since September 25, 2003. Villarreal finished the season with 2 wins and no losses, 5 strikeouts, and a 5.27 earned run average.

=== Atlanta Braves ===
On December 7, 2005, Villarreal and fellow pitcher Lance Cormier were traded to the Atlanta Braves for catcher Johnny Estrada. In his first year with the Braves, Villarreal went 9–1 with 55 strikeouts and a 3.61 ERA in 58 games.

=== Houston Astros ===
On November 16, 2007, he was traded to the Houston Astros for outfielder Josh Anderson. On December 28, 2007, the Astros signed Villarreal to a two-year contract worth $2.85 million, with a club option for 2010. After being designated for assignment, Villarreal refused a minor league assignment and became a free agent.

=== Seattle Mariners ===
He signed a minor league contract with the Seattle Mariners and was assigned to their Triple-A affiliate, the Tacoma Rainiers, on July 22, 2008. He was released after a few weeks due to his desire to become a free agent and sign elsewhere.

=== Colorado Rockies ===
On August 16, Villarreal signed a minor league contract with the Colorado Rockies and was assigned to Triple-A Colorado Springs. He became a free agent at the end of the season.

=== Kansas City Royals ===
On December 17, 2008, he signed a minor league contract with the Kansas City Royals. On January 28, 2009, Villarreal was released by the Royals.

=== Philadelphia Phillies ===
After missing all of 2009 due to Tommy John surgery, Villarreal signed a minor league contract with the Philadelphia Phillies on February 4, 2010. He played for their Triple-A affiliate, the Lehigh Valley IronPigs.

=== Los Angeles Dodgers ===
On November 23, 2010, he signed a minor league contract with the Los Angeles Dodgers, that included an invitation to spring training. He began the season in Triple-A with the Albuquerque Isotopes but on April 11, he was loaned to the Sultanes de Monterrey of the Mexican League.

=== Baltimore Orioles ===
On January 20, 2012, Villarreal signed a minor league contract with the Baltimore Orioles organization. He made 37 appearances (two starts) for the Triple-A Norfolk Tides, compiling a 3-4 record and 2.88 ERA with 49 strikeouts and one save across 68 2/3 innings pitched. Villarreal elected free agency following the season on November 2.

=== Boston Red Sox ===
On November 29, 2012, Villarreal signed a minor league contract with the Boston Red Sox with spring training invitation and was assigned to the Triple-A Pawtucket Red Sox. He posted a 4–2 record and a 4.44 ERA in 14 relief appearances for the PawSox before being released on June 6, 2013.

=== Sultanes de Monterrey ===
On June 7, 2013, Villarreal signed with the Sultanes de Monterrey of the Mexican League, playing with the team for parts of five seasons before he was released on February 12, 2018.

== Personal life ==
Villarreal and his wife Claudia have one daughter, Valeria, and three sons, Oscar, Máx and Mateo. The family resides in Monterrey, Nuevo León, Mexico.
