= Geoff Geary =

American baseball player (born 1976)

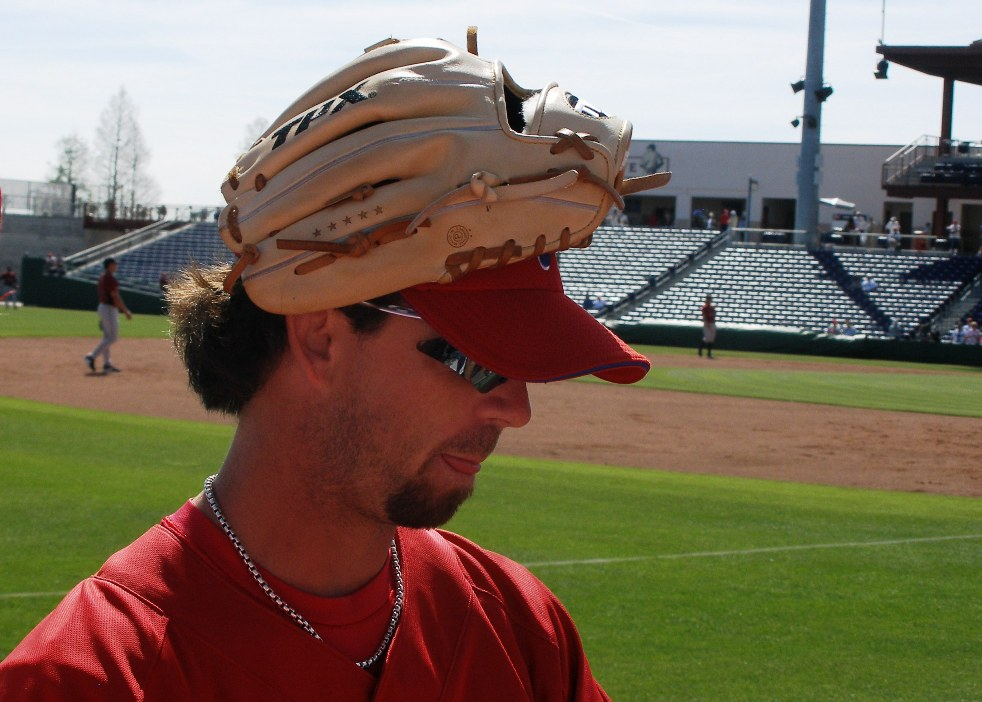
- Geary with the Philadelphia Phillies on March 12, 2007
- Pitcher
- Born: August 26, 1976 (age 48); Buffalo, New York, U.S.
- Batted: Right Threw: Right

MLB debut
- August 27, 2003, for the Philadelphia Phillies

Last MLB appearance
- May 13, 2009, for the Houston Astros

MLB statistics
- Win–loss record: 16–10
- Earned run average: 3.92
- Strikeouts: 230
- Stats at Baseball Reference

Teams
- Philadelphia Phillies (2003–2007); Houston Astros (2008–2009)

Geoffrey Michael Geary (born August 26, 1976) is an American former professional baseball right-handed relief pitcher, who played in Major League Baseball (MLB) for the Philadelphia Phillies and Houston Astros.

== Biography ==
Geary graduated from Grossmont High School in 1994 in El Cajon, CA. He attended San Diego Mesa College and the University of Oklahoma. While at Oklahoma Geary went 4–3 with a 2.20 ERA at Oklahoma and led Big 12 in ERA in 1997.

== Professional career ==
=== Philadelphia Phillies ===
Geoff Geary was drafted by Philadelphia Phillies in the 15th round (434th overall) of the 1998 amateur entry draft. He was awarded Red Barons Pitcher of the Year in 2003 after a stellar year in AAA. That year, he primarily filled three roles: as a starter, set-up man and closer, where he reached career-highs in games (46) and saves (5) and fell one win shy of tying his career high (10). He was awarded Phillies Minor League Pitcher of the Month for June 2003. He also was awarded the Greg Legg Tenth Man Award, by the Scranton booster club, given to a player who comes off the bench to consistently contribute to the success of their team. That year, he made his major league debut on August 27, 2003, against the Montreal Expos, allowing one run in his one inning of work. He appeared in only 5 games in 2003. In 58 innings in 2005, he compiled a 3.72 ERA and showed improvement as the season went on by posting a 2.70 ERA after the all-star break.

In 2006, Geary went 7–1 with a 2.96 ERA in 91.1 innings and posted a career best ERA and a team best ERA for pitchers with over 25 innings pitched. He also had the lowest ERA in the National League for relievers with over 80 innings pitched. After making close to the major league minimum from 2003 to 2006, he became eligible for salary arbitration for the first time in the 2006–2007 offseason and was offered $750,000 by the Phillies while he asked for $925,000. Geary agreed to a one-year contract worth $837,500 with the Philadelphia Phillies, avoiding arbitration. Geoff was pitching with the team's AAA affiliate the Ottawa Lynx until July 29, 2007, when the team recalled him after an injury to Ryan Madson.

=== Houston Astros ===
On November 7, 2007, Geary was traded to the Houston Astros along with Michael Bourn and Mike Costanzo for Brad Lidge and Eric Bruntlett. Geary had a career year in 2008 for the Astros with a career-low 2.53 ERA in 64 innings pitched. However, in 2009, Geary went 1–3 with an 8.10 ERA in 16 appearances before going on the disabled list May 14 with tendinitis in his right biceps. On June 10, he was activated but placed on waivers and sent outright to Triple-A Round Rock Express. In October 2009 Geary was granted free agency.

=== Texas Rangers ===
On December 16, 2009, Geary signed a minor league contract with the Texas Rangers with an invitation to spring training. He played with the Oklahoma City RedHawks, where he appeared in 23 games and had a record of 4–5 with a 5.37 ERA when he was released on July 27, 2010.

=== Los Angeles Dodgers ===
On August 8, 2010, he signed a minor league deal with the Los Angeles Dodgers, and was assigned to Triple-A Albuquerque the following day. He appeared in eight games with a 5.06 ERA.

=== San Diego Padres ===
On February 16, 2011, he was signed to a minor league deal with the San Diego Padres. He was released on March 26.

=== York Revolution ===
On June 23, 2011, Geary signed a contract with the York Revolution of the Atlantic League. He became a free agent following the season. In 23 games 22.2 innings of relief he went 3-2 with a 3.57 ERA and 21 strikeouts.
