= Macay McBride =

American baseball player (born 1982)

- Relief pitcher
- Born: October 24, 1982 (age 43); Augusta, Georgia, U.S.
- Batted: Left Threw: Left

MLB debut
- July 22, 2005, for the Atlanta Braves

Last MLB appearance
- August 10, 2007, for the Detroit Tigers

MLB statistics
- Win–loss record: 6–2
- Earned run average: 4.35
- Strikeouts: 98
- Stats at Baseball Reference

Teams
- Atlanta Braves (2005–2007); Detroit Tigers (2007)

Joseph Macay McBride (born October 24, 1982) is an American former professional baseball relief pitcher. He played in Major League Baseball (MLB) for the Atlanta Braves and the Detroit Tigers.

== Career ==
=== High school ===
McBride attended Screven County High School in Sylvania, Georgia, and made his mark as a power pitcher with a fastball in the low 90s. As a high school junior he led the all-state Team Georgia to victory in the annual Sunbelt Classic and was named the tournament's most valuable player (MVP). In his final season (2001) McBride went 11–2 and notched 161 strikeouts. The Augusta Chronicle named McBride to its all-area team every year, and considered McBride "one of the state's most dominant pitchers." Although McBride initially committed to the University of Georgia, which had offered him a baseball scholarship, in the end he entered the amateur draft and was selected by the Atlanta Braves in the first round, 24th pick overall.

=== Atlanta Braves ===
The Braves gave McBride a $1.34 million signing bonus and assigned him to the Gulf Coast Braves, their Rookie-level minor league affiliate. McBride worked primarily as a starter in the Gulf Coast League, going 4–4 with a 3.76 ERA and averaging nearly 11 strikeouts per nine innings. In 2002, Atlanta promoted McBride to the Single-A Macon Braves, where went 12–8 and led the South Atlantic League with a 2.12 ERA. Promoted again in 2003 to the High-A Myrtle Beach Pelicans, McBride went 9–8 with a 2.95 ERA.

McBride made the jump from Single to Double-A ball in 2004 when he joined the Greenville Braves. He struggled in Greenville, posting a 1–7 record with a 4.46 ERA. Among his teammates that year were former Tigers pitcher Brian Moehler and future Tigers/Mud Hens teammate Zach Miner. McBride followed the Braves to Mississippi in 2005 as the franchise relocated and showed improvement, going 3–1 with a 3.65 ERA over six appearances. Atlanta promoted him to the Triple-A Richmond Braves, where he compiled a 1–5 record with a 4.33 ERA, almost wholly in relief. Lefties only hit .172 against him while he played for Richmond.

McBride was recalled from Triple-A on July 21, 2005, after the Braves traded Kevin Gryboski to the Texas Rangers. He made his major league debut on July 22 and pitched 14 innings for the Braves in 23 games, with a 5.79 earned run average and 22 strikeouts in his rookie campaign. McBride rejoined Atlanta for the 2005 National League Division Series, pitching an inning of scoreless relief in Game 1 against the Houston Astros.

McBride completed his first full season in the majors in 2006, finishing with a 4–1 record and a 3.65 ERA in 71 appearances. He recorded his lone save of the season on May 21, 2006, against the Arizona Diamondbacks. At the start of the 2007 season McBride struggled with his control was consequently optioned to Richmond to work on his control problems. Atlanta recalled McBride in mid-May, and he put together a 1–0 record with a 3.60 ERA before the being traded to the Detroit Tigers on June 20 for pitcher Wilfredo Ledezma. McBride, a native of Georgia, expressed disappointment: "I don't feel anything right now.... Growing up watching the Braves, I wanted to be part of a team that wins here. But these guys [Tigers] are pretty good, too." As it happened, the Tigers were coming to town for an interleague series, so McBride simply moved his belongings from the home clubhouse to the visitors' clubhouse.

=== Detroit Tigers ===
The Tigers put McBride to work in the bullpen, where he went 0–1 with a 6.12 ERA before the Tigers optioned him to the Triple-A Toledo Mud Hens in mid-August. In the off-season McBride announced that a broken bone in his elbow had hampered his efforts. On April 6, 2008, McBride went back on the disabled list at Toledo with "soreness in his throwing elbow."

=== Lancaster Barnstormers ===
McBride signed with the Lancaster Barnstormers of the Atlantic League of Professional Baseball for the 2010 season in which he only appeared in one game.
