= Tyler Yates =

American baseball player (born 1977)

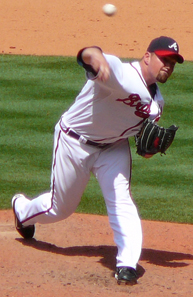
- Yates with the Atlanta Braves in 2007
- Pitcher
- Born: August 7, 1977 (age 48); Lihue, Hawaii, U.S.
- Batted: Right Threw: Right

MLB debut
- April 9, 2004, for the New York Mets

Last MLB appearance
- May 15, 2009, for the Pittsburgh Pirates

MLB statistics
- Win–loss record: 12–17
- Earned run average: 5.12
- Strikeouts: 222
- Stats at Baseball Reference

Teams
- New York Mets (2004); Atlanta Braves (2006–2007); Pittsburgh Pirates (2008–2009)

Tyler Kali Yates (born August 7, 1977) is an American police officer and former professional baseball pitcher. He played in Major League Baseball for the New York Mets, Atlanta Braves, and Pittsburgh Pirates.

== Career ==
=== Oakland Athletics ===
Yates attended the University of Hawaii at Hilo before being drafted by the Oakland Athletics in the 23rd round, with the 675th overall selection, of the 1998 Major League Baseball draft. He spent his first professional season with the rookie-level Arizona League Athletics and Low-A Southern Oregon Timberjacks.

Yates spent the 1999 season with the High-A Visalia Oaks, logging a 2–5 record and 5.47 ERA with 74 strikeouts and 4 saves across 47 contests. He split 2000 between the High-A Modesto A's and Double-A Midland RockHounds, accumulating a 5-3 record and 3.90 ERA with 85 strikeouts in 83 innings pitched across 52 relief appearances. Yates spent the 2001 season with Midland and the Triple-A Sacramento River Cats. In 60 appearances split between the two affiliates, he compiled a 5–6 record and 3.97 ERA with 64 strikeouts and 18 saves across 68 innings of work.

=== New York Mets ===
Yates pitched in the Athletics organization until being traded to the New York Mets with Mark Guthrie on December 1, 2001, for David Justice. His 2002 season was limited by Tommy John surgery.

Yates split the 2003 season between three minor league teams. He participated in spring training the next year, and debuted against the Montreal Expos on April 9, 2004. Ten days later, Yates earned his first major league victory in another appearance against Montreal. By May, Yates had returned to the minor leagues to pitch as a reliever. Yates underwent rotator cuff surgery and did not pitch during the 2005 season.

=== Atlanta Braves ===
Yates was released by the Mets at the conclusion of the 2005 season, and joined the Baltimore Orioles before the 2006 season, participating in spring training as a non-roster invitee. He was subsequently released from the Orioles, and signed with the Atlanta Braves on May 3, 2006. Yates recorded the first save of his career on July 14, 2006, in a 15–12 extra-inning win over the San Diego Padres. He made the Braves' Opening Day roster in 2007, and agreed to terms with the team prior to the start of the 2008 season.

=== Pittsburgh Pirates ===
Yates was traded to the Pittsburgh Pirates on March 26, 2008, in exchange for minor league pitcher Todd Redmond. He made 72 appearances for Pittsburgh during the 2008 campaign, registering a 6–3 record and 4.66 ERA with 63 strikeouts across 73 1/3 innings pitched.

Yates pitched in 15 games for the Pirates in 2009, struggling to an 0–2 record and 7.50 ERA with 9 strikeouts over 12 innings of work. On July 16, 2009, it was announced that Yates would miss the remainder of the season after having a second Tommy John procedure, performed by James Andrews. On October 27, Yates was removed from the 40-man roster and sent outright to the Triple-A Indianapolis Indians, but rejected the assignment and elected free agency.

On January 4, 2010, Yates re-signed with the Pirates on a minor league contract. but not expected to pitch until May or June. He did not appear for the organization and elected free agency following the season on November 6.

On December 16, 2010, Yates once more re-signed with the Pirates organization on a minor league contract and participated in spring training. He was cut from major league camp in March, and did not pitch for the organization during the 2011 campaign. Yates elected free agency following the season on November 2, 2011.

== Personal life ==
Tyler is the eldest of three brothers, including Spencer and Kirby Yates. Tyler and Kirby were the second pair of brothers from Hawaii to play Major League Baseball, after Bronson and Dane Sardinha. Since retiring from baseball, Tyler became a police officer in Kauai. Tyler dated Liesel throughout his professional baseball career. The two later married and had two children.
