= Lance Cormier =

American baseball player (born 1980)

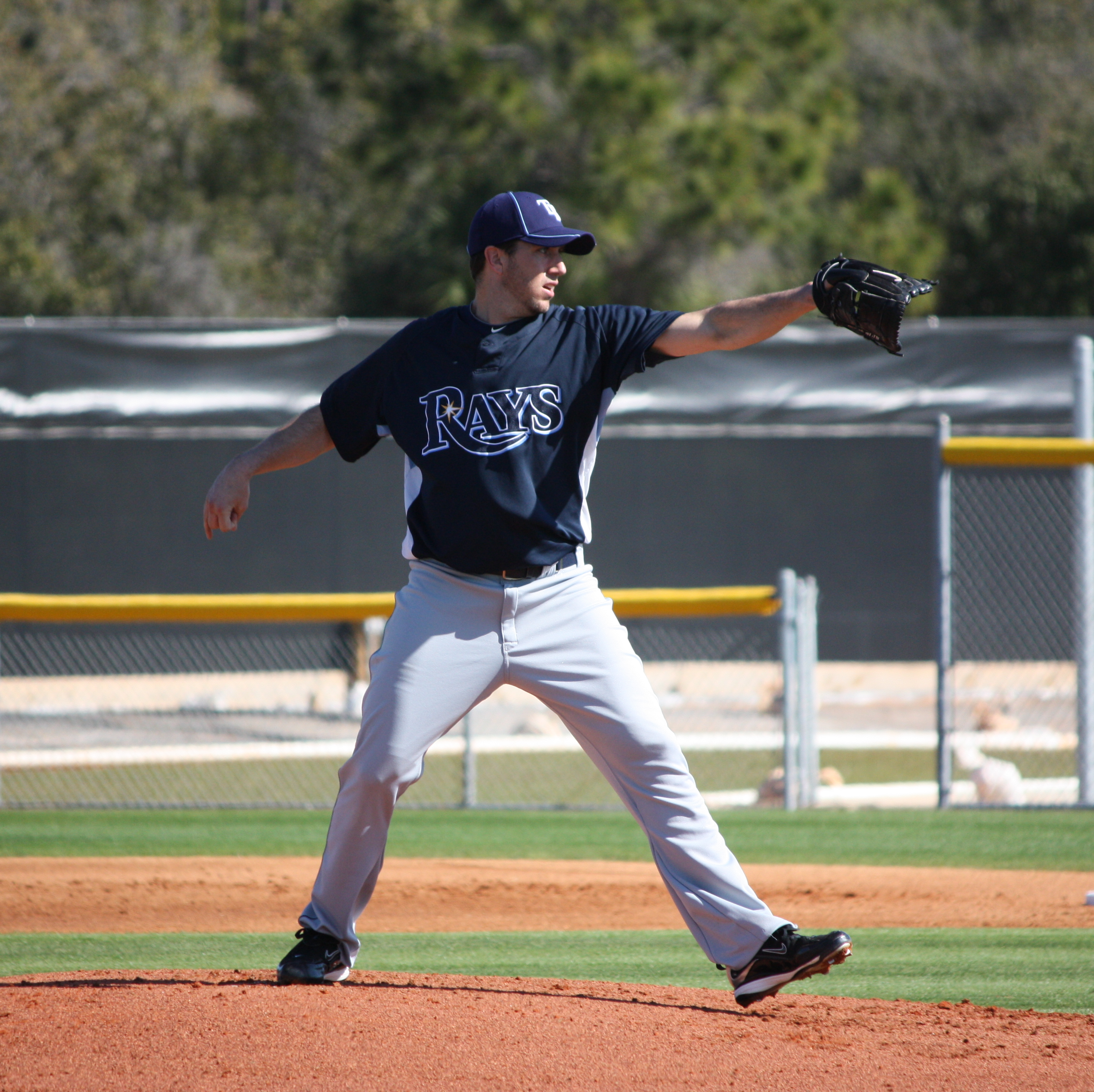
- Cormier with the Tampa Bay Rays
- Pitcher
- Born: August 19, 1980 (age 45); Lafayette, Louisiana, U.S.
- Batted: Right Threw: Right

MLB debut
- June 19, 2004, for the Arizona Diamondbacks

Last MLB appearance
- May 21, 2011, for the Los Angeles Dodgers

MLB statistics
- Win–loss record: 24–28
- Earned run average: 5.07
- Strikeouts: 276
- Stats at Baseball Reference

Teams
- Arizona Diamondbacks (2004–2005); Atlanta Braves (2006–2007); Baltimore Orioles (2008); Tampa Bay Rays (2009–2010); Los Angeles Dodgers (2011)

Lance Robert Cormier (CORE-mee-ay) (born August 19, 1980) is an American former professional baseball pitcher. He played in Major League Baseball (MLB) for the Tampa Bay Rays, Atlanta Braves, Arizona Diamondbacks, Baltimore Orioles, and Los Angeles Dodgers.

== Early years ==
Cormier went to Lafayette High School and graduated in 1998. He attended the University of Alabama, and in his pitching career there, he went 31–16 with a 3.98 ERA and 17 saves. Lance started his career as a closer and recorded a University of Alabama freshman record 11 saves. In 2000, he played collegiate summer baseball with the Wareham Gatemen of the Cape Cod Baseball League. In his junior year, he switched to being a starting pitcher and went 20–8 in the last two seasons of his college career. A highlight of his college career includes being a first team Academic All-American in his senior year. He graduated in 2002 with a degree in finance.

== Professional career ==
=== Initial drafts ===
Twice Cormier was drafted by a major league team, but he did not sign for either. On June 2, 1998, he was drafted by the Cincinnati Reds in the 40th round (1,190th overall) of the 1998 Major League Baseball draft, but did not sign. On June 5, 2001, he was drafted by the Houston Astros in the 10th round (296th overall) of the 2001 Major League Baseball draft, but again he did not sign. The Arizona Diamondbacks drafted him in the fourth round (129th overall) of the 2002 Major League Baseball draft on June 4, 2002.

=== Arizona Diamondbacks ===
In 2002, Cormier pitched for the Single-A South Bend Silver Hawks and the Yakima Bears. In 11 games (three starts) with the Silver Hawks, he went 3–0 with 17 strikeouts and a 2.93 ERA in 27.2 innings. With the Yakima team, he went 0–0 with three strikeouts and a 27.00 ERA in one inning. His combined statistics for the year was a 3–0 record with 20 strikeouts and a 3.83 ERA in 28.2 innings pitched.

Cormier made 15 starts for the Lancaster JetHawks in 2003, going 6–5 with 59 strikeouts and a 3.82 ERA, before being moved up to the Double-A El Paso Diablos. In nine games (eight starts) with the Diablos, Cormier went 2–3 with 26 strikeouts, and a 6.10 ERA. He also earned a promotion to the Triple-A Tucson Sidewinders, going 1–1 with a 2.60 ERA and 11 strikeouts in five games (four starts). His stats for the season were an 9–9 win–loss record, 96 strikeouts, and a 4.19 ERA in 163.1 innings.

Cormier started 2004 with El Paso, going 2–3 with a 2.29 ERA in 10 games, including one of his best games on May 6, where he allowed two hits in seven innings and struck out 10. In May, he was promoted to Triple-A Tucson, where he went 1–1 with a 1.77 ERA in three starts. On June 18, he was called up to the big leagues when pitcher José Valverde was placed on the disabled list. Cormier's first major league start was on June 19 against the Tampa Bay Devil Rays and he took the loss, allowing seven runs on six hits in 1.1 innings as the Devil Rays went on to win 11–4. After the game, he was sent back down to Tucson, where he was elected the Diamondbacks Minor League Pitcher of the Month for June.

After being brought back up to the majors in July, he recorded his first big-league RBI on July 24. On July 29, Cormier beat the Houston Astros, 6–4. He pitched six innings while striking out five, and recorded his first major league hit. He made a move to the bullpen after losing his next two games. From August 29 to September 11, batters only hit .136 off Cormier. In his first Major League action, he was 1–4 with an 8.14 ERA in 17 games (five starts).

In 2005, Cormier appeared in 67 games for the Diamondbacks, going 7–3 with a 5.11 ERA. His seven wins tied for fourth place among National League relief pitchers. He pitched 18 scoreless innings at the beginning of the season, and on April 29, he recorded a career-high four strikeouts against the San Diego Padres. He compiled a 1.04 ERA in his last nine games of the season.

=== Atlanta Braves ===
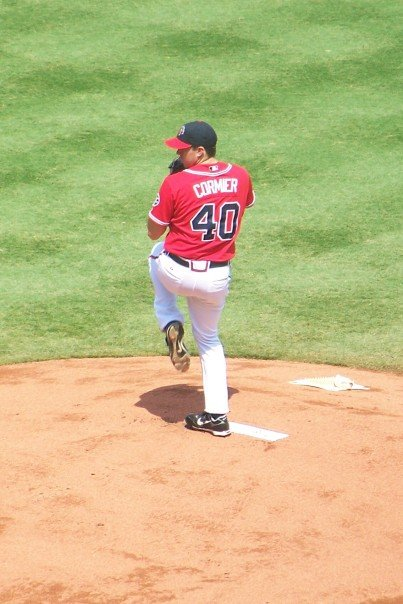
Cormier pitching for the Atlanta Braves in 2007.

On December 7, 2005, Cormier was traded to the Atlanta Braves along with pitcher Óscar Villarreal for catcher Johnny Estrada. He made his first appearance for the Braves on April 3, 2006. After being demoted to the Richmond Braves on August 21, Cormier was called back up to the big league team four days later on August 25.

Cormier suffered an injury during spring training 2007 which kept him out for the season's first two months. In his season debut on June 3, he allowed eight earned runs in only four innings against the Chicago Cubs. In his next start, he allowed five earned runs again against the Cubs. He was later sent down to Triple-A Richmond. After pitching a complete game shutout in Richmond, Cormier was called up on August 2. He allowed two earned runs in relief against the Colorado Rockies on August 3. On August 11, his first start since June 3, Cormier allowed four runs in four innings against the Philadelphia Phillies and left with a no-decision. He earned his first win of the 2007 season on August 27, allowing two runs in seven innings pitched against the Florida Marlins. He won consecutive starts for the first time in his career one start later against the Philadelphia Phillies. He finished the season a disappointing 2–6 with a 7.09 ERA in 10 games (nine starts).

Cormier was designated for assignment on November 30, 2007, to make room for Tom Glavine. Consequently, he was released on December 7, 2007.

=== Baltimore Orioles ===
On January 21, 2008, Cormier signed a minor league contract with an invitation to spring training with the Baltimore Orioles. He began the season with the Triple-A Norfolk Tides before being promoted to the Orioles on May 3. He was 3–3 with a 4.02 ERA in 45 games for the Orioles.

=== Tampa Bay Rays ===
On January 16, 2009, Cormier signed a one-year, $675,000 contract with the Tampa Bay Rays. After the season, the Rays signed him to a one-year, $1.2 million contract to avoid arbitration. In two seasons with the Rays, he was 7–6 with a 3.55 ERA in 113 games.

=== Los Angeles Dodgers ===
On February 16, 2011, Cormier signed a minor league contract with the Los Angeles Dodgers and made the big league club out of spring training. The Dodgers mostly used him in long relief, where he was 0–1 with a 9.88 ERA before he was designated for assignment on May 24. On June 2, he cleared waivers and became a free agent.

=== Return to Tampa Bay ===
Cormier signed a minor league contract with the Tampa Bay Rays on June 6, 2011. He was assigned to the Triple-A Durham Bulls. With Durham, he appeared in 20 games (four starts) and was 4–3 with a 5.51 ERA.
