= Eude Brito =

Dominican baseball player (born 1978)

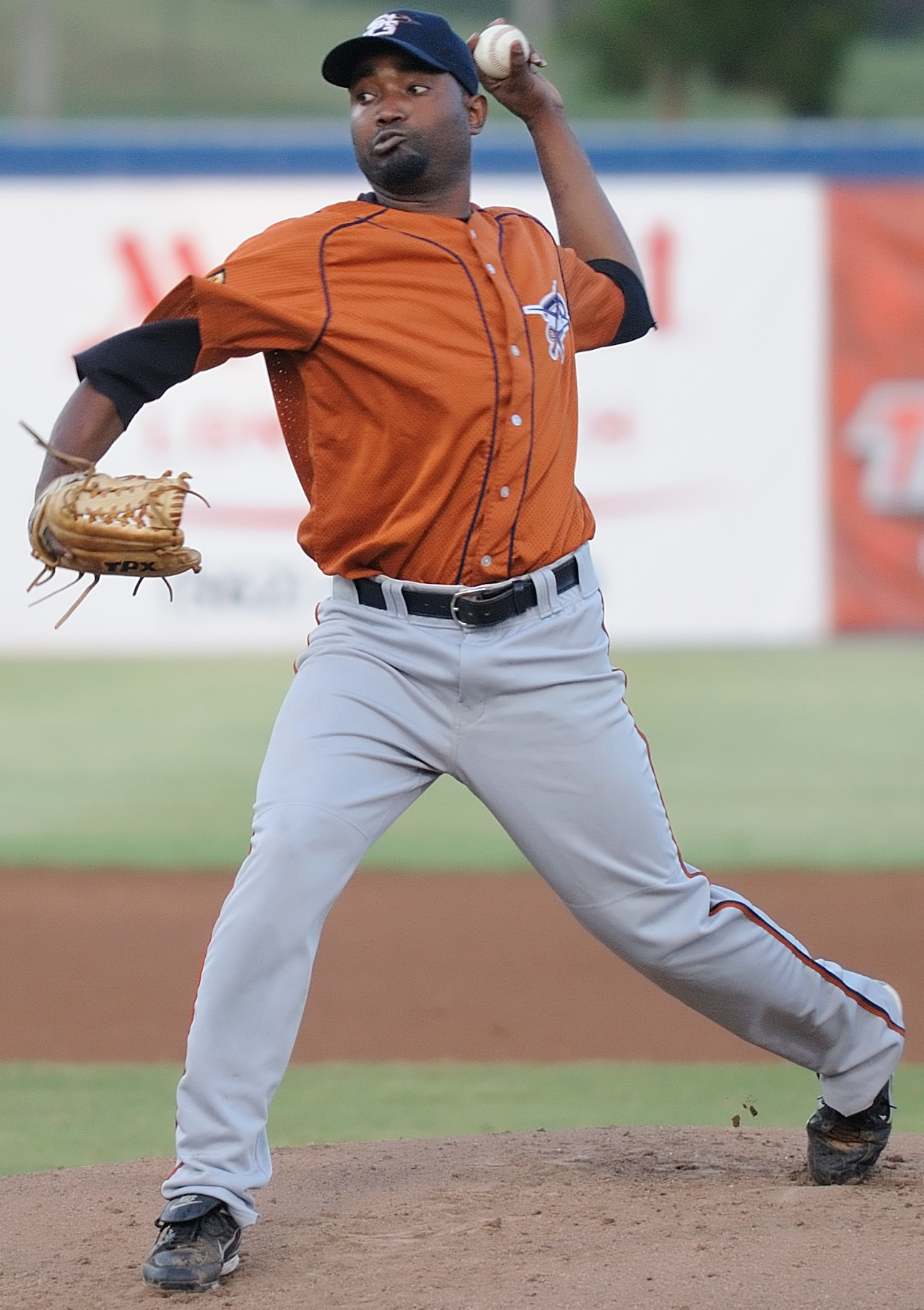
- Pitcher
- Born: August 19, 1978 (age 47); Sabana de la Mar, Dominican Republic
- Batted: Left Threw: Left

MLB debut
- August 21, 2005, for the Philadelphia Phillies

Last MLB appearance
- September 18, 2006, for the Philadelphia Phillies

MLB statistics
- Win–loss record: 2–4
- Earned run average: 5.36
- Strikeouts: 24
- Stats at Baseball Reference

Teams
- Philadelphia Phillies (2005–2006)

Eude Ezequiel Brito Romero (born August 19, 1978) is a Dominican former professional baseball pitcher, who played in Major League Baseball (MLB) for the Philadelphia Phillies, from 2005 to 2006. The left-hander posted a lifetime big league win–loss record of 2–4.

== Career ==
Brito was signed by the Philadelphia Phillies on July 3, 1998, as a non-drafted amateur free agent. After playing in the Phillies’ Minor League Baseball (MiLB) farm system, from 1999 to 2004, he made his MLB debut, on August 21, 2005, with the Phillies. For the 2005 season, Brito posted a win–loss record of 1–2, with a 3.68 earned run average (ERA). In March 2006, he pitched for the Dominican Republic national baseball team, during the inaugural 2006 World Baseball Classic (WBC), alongside Albert Pujols, among many other elite baseball players from around the globe.

Brito had begun 2006 spring training with the Phillies, but when he returned from the WBC, the team optioned him to the Triple-A International League Scranton/Wilkes-Barre Red Barons. On June 3, 2006, he was recalled to the Phils, but was sent back to the minors on June 9, after having lost his first two decisions. Despite his having notched one last MLB victory, achieved during a late-season cup of coffee with Philadelphia, Brito was granted free agency, on October 29, 2007.

On January 11, 2008, Brito signed a minor league contract with the Washington Nationals. He began the 2008 season with the Double-A Eastern League Harrisburg Senators and quickly earned a promotion to Triple-A, before being released, on April 16, 2008. On April 22, 2008, he signed a minor league contract with the New York Mets, subsequently playing at their Double- and Triple-A levels. Brito became a free agent, following the end of the season. In 2009 and 2010, he pitched for the St. George Roadrunners of the (Independent) Golden Baseball League.
