= Horacio Ramírez =

American baseball player (born 1979)

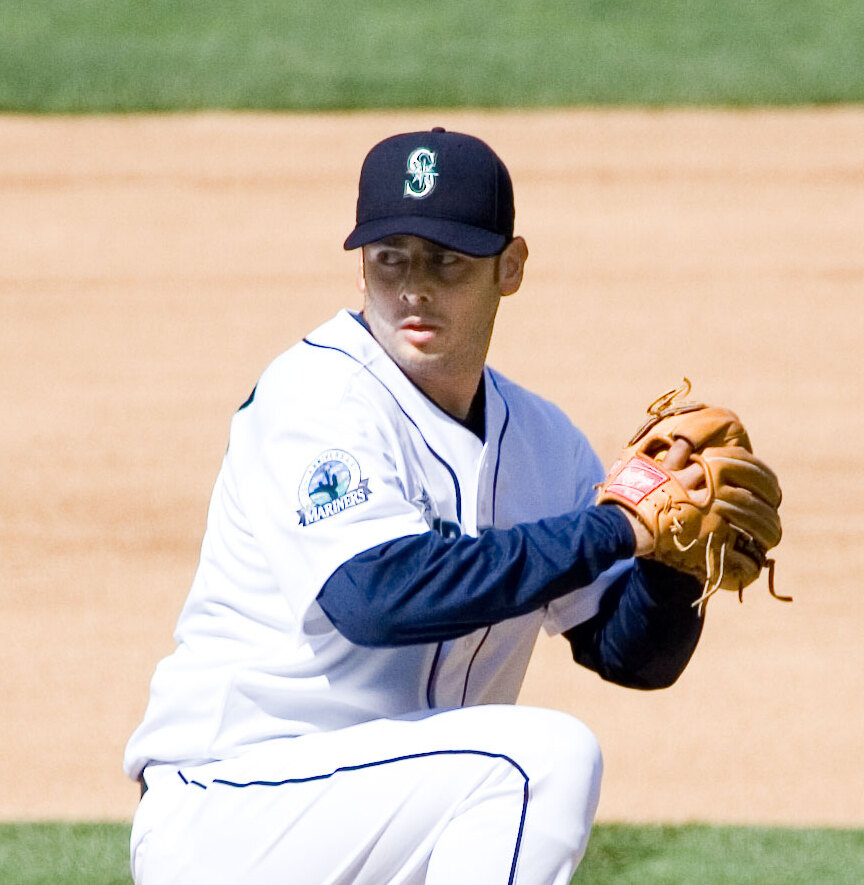
- Ramírez with the Seattle Mariners
- Pitcher / Coach
- Born: November 24, 1979 (age 46); Carson, California, U.S.
- Batted: Left Threw: Left

Professional debut
- MLB: April 2, 2003, for the Atlanta Braves
- KBO: May 3, 2012, for the Kia Tigers

Last appearance
- MLB: September 27, 2011, for the Los Angeles Angels of Anaheim
- KBO: June 3, 2012, for the Kia Tigers

MLB statistics
- Win–loss record: 40–35
- Earned run average: 4.65
- Strikeouts: 318

KBO statistics
- Win–loss record: 2–1
- Earned run average: 3.86
- Strikeouts: 5
- Stats at Baseball Reference

Teams
- Atlanta Braves (2003–2006); Seattle Mariners (2007); Kansas City Royals (2008); Chicago White Sox (2008); Kansas City Royals (2009); Los Angeles Angels of Anaheim (2011); Kia Tigers (2012)
Medals
Men's baseball
Representing Mexico
2019 WBSC Premier12
Bronze medal – third place	2019 Tokyo	National team

Horacio Ramírez (born November 24, 1979) is a Mexican-American former professional baseball pitcher. He played in Major League Baseball (MLB) for the Atlanta Braves, Seattle Mariners, Chicago White Sox, and Los Angeles Angels of Anaheim and in the KBO League for the Kia Tigers.

== Baseball career ==
=== Atlanta Braves ===
The Atlanta Braves drafted Ramírez in the fifth round of the 1997 Major League Baseball draft out of Inglewood High School in California. He made his debut in the majors for Atlanta in 2003, when he finished the season 12–4 with a 4.00 ERA in 29 starts. At the end of his rookie season, he was selected to the Baseball Digest All-Star Rookie team. He got off to an excellent start in 2004, posting a 2–4 with a 2.28 ERA in his first nine starts, before he suffered a shoulder injury and was placed on the disabled list on May 30. While initially thought to be a minor injury, Ramírez was not activated until September 26.

In 2005, Ramírez finished with an 11–9 record and 4.63 ERA in 33 games (32 starts), pitching over 200 innings for the only time in his career. He remained in the Braves' rotation in 2006 as the number 3 starter, going 5–5 with a 4.48 ERA in 14 starts.

=== Seattle Mariners ===
On December 6, 2006, the Braves traded Ramírez to the Seattle Mariners for reliever Rafael Soriano. In his lone season with Seattle, Ramírez posted a record of 8–7 but had an ERA of 7.16 in 20 starts.

On March 12, 2008, Ramírez was released by the Mariners.

=== Kansas City Royals ===
On May 21, 2008, Ramírez signed a minor league deal with the Kansas City Royals. He pitched in 15 games for the Royals out of the bullpen, going 1–1 with a 2.59 ERA.

=== Chicago White Sox ===
On August 9, 2008, Ramírez was traded to the Chicago White Sox for outfielder Paulo Orlando. In 17 relief appearances, he allowed 11 runs in 13 innings. He became a free agent following the season.

=== Kansas City Royals (second stint) ===
On December 11, 2008, Ramírez signed a one-year deal with the Kansas City Royals. His first start for the Royals was the last start of his MLB career, in which he allowed 6 runs in 4 1/3 innings on April 11. In 18 bullpen appearances, he had a 4.43 ERA, one loss, and one blown save. On June 6, the Royals designated him for assignment.

=== Washington Nationals ===
On June 15, 2009, Ramírez signed a minor league contract with the Washington Nationals. He started 16 games for the Triple-A Syracuse Chiefs, going 3–7. He became a free agent on November 9.

=== San Francisco Giants ===
On February 1, 2010, Ramírez signed a minor league contract with the San Francisco Giants. He made only three starts for the Triple-A Fresno Grizzles, spending four months on the disabled list. He became a free agent following the season on November 6.

=== Los Angeles Angels of Anaheim ===
On March 11, 2011, Ramírez signed a minor league deal with the Los Angeles Angels of Anaheim. He began the season with the Triple-A Salt Lake Bees, where he earned the only 6 saves of his professional career. On July 20, the Angels purchased Ramírez's contract. He was not effective as a reliever, going 1–0 while allowing 6 runs and 16 hits in 9 innings in the final 12 games of his major league career. He became a free agent after the season.

=== Kia Tigers ===
On February 20, 2012, Ramírez signed with Kia Tigers of the Korea Baseball Organization. He was released on June 5 after 10 relief appearances.

=== Lancaster Barnstormers ===
On June 15, 2012, Ramírez signed with the Lancaster Barnstormers of the Atlantic League of Professional Baseball. In 12 games (6 starts) 36 2/3 innings he went 2–0 with a 1.96 ERA and 22 strikeouts.

=== Chicago Cubs ===
On August 17, 2012, Ramírez signed a minor league contract with the Chicago Cubs. He made three starts for the Triple-A Iowa Cubs. He elected free agency after the season on November 2.

=== Lancaster Barnstormers (second stint) ===
On May 11, 2013, Ramírez signed again with the Lancaster Barnstormers. In 9 games (8 starts), he went 5–1 with a 3.51 ERA and 35 strikeouts in 48 2/3 innings.

=== Tigres de Quintana Roo ===
On July 5, 2013, Ramírez signed with the Tigres de Quintana Roo of the Mexican League. In 6 starts (40 innings) he went 3–2 with a 3.38 ERA and 24 strikeouts.

=== Toros de Tijuana ===
After pausing his playing career to coach in MLB, on March 5, 2016, Ramírez began a professional comeback, signing with the Toros de Tijuana of the Mexican League. Starting 21 games for Tijuana, he had a 6–4 record, 4.15 ERA, and 49 strikeouts in 102 innings pitched. In 2017, Ramírez started 11 games, posting a 4–3 record and 4.06 ERA with 25 strikeouts in 62 innings of work. He started 12 games, appearing in 16, for Tijuana the following year, recording a 3–2 record, 3.94 ERA, and 28 strikeouts in 64 innings pitched. For the 2019 season, Ramírez made 32 appearances for the Toros, pitching to a 4–0 record and 2.60 ERA with 9 strikeouts in 34 2/3 innings of work.

Ramírez did not play in a game in 2020 due to the cancellation of the league's season because of the COVID-19 pandemic. On June 8, 2021, Ramírez re-signed with the Toros. He made 12 appearances (10 starts) for Tijuana in 2021, working to a 3–3 record and 4.50 ERA with 17 strikeouts in 50 innings pitched. He did not play in a game for the team in 2022 and was released on January 19, 2023.

== International career ==
On January 18, 2013, Ramírez was named to the Mexican national team's roster for that spring's World Baseball Classic (WBC). However, he did not pitch in the tournament.

Ramírez pitched twice for Mexico in the 2019 WBSC Premier12 tournament, allowing 5 earned runs in 4 1/3 innings as his team finished third.

In 2023, Ramírez was announced as Mexico's bullpen coach for the 2023 WBC.

== Coaching career ==
On March 10, 2014, the Atlanta Braves named Ramírez as a coaching assistant. He was brought on to assist coaches with on-field duties prior to games and manage Atlanta's instant replay protocol from an off-field location during games.

On January 25, 2024, Ramírez was named the bullpen coach for the Florida Complex League Braves, an Atlanta rookie-level affiliate. On February 11, 2025, Ramírez was named pitching coach for the Rome Emperors, Atlanta's High-A affiliate.

== Personal life ==
Ramírez's parents emigrated from Jalostotitlán, Jalisco, Mexico. He has two sisters. His grandmother, then living in Mexico, flew to watch his first start at Dodger Stadium. Ramírez grew up in southern California, rooting for the Los Angeles Dodgers.

Ramírez is married and has two children.
