= 2007 Chicago Cubs season =

2007 Chicago Cubs
- National League Central champions
- League: National League
- Division: Central
- Ballpark: Wrigley Field
- City: Chicago
- Record: 85–77 (.525)
- Divisional place: 1st
- Owners: Tribune Company
- General managers: Jim Hendry
- Managers: Lou Piniella
- Television: CSN Chicago; Superstation WGN; WCIU-TV (Len Kasper, Bob Brenly, Cory Provus)
- Radio: WGN (AM) 720 (Pat Hughes, Ron Santo, Cory Provus)
- Stats: ESPN.com; Baseball Reference

The 2007 Chicago Cubs season was the 136th season of the Chicago Cubs franchise, the 132nd in the National League and the 92nd at Wrigley Field. The Cubs, trying to rebound after a season in which they finished last in their division for the first time since 2000, finished first in the National League Central with a record of 85–77, their first postseason berth and division title since 2003, and their first winning season since 2004. They were swept three games to none by the Arizona Diamondbacks in the NLDS.

== Offseason ==
In an attempt to rebuild the team, the Cubs were very aggressive in the free-agent market, signing a number of players with the goal of overtaking the World Champion St. Louis Cardinals in a competitive NL Central to win the World Series for the first time since 1908.

The first change was the signing of a new manager. On October 17, 2006, Lou Piniella signed a three-year deal with an option for a fourth season to manage the Cubs — the 50th manager in team history after Dusty Baker was not offered an extension of his contract following the 2006 season.

On November 14, 2006, the Cubs improved their depth by signing Mark DeRosa to a three-year, $13 million contract. DeRosa had played several positions for the Texas Rangers and Atlanta Braves earlier in his career. Two days later on November 16, Neal Cotts was traded by the Chicago White Sox to the Chicago Cubs for David Aardsma and Carlos Vásquez (minors).

The Cubs made the largest acquisition in their team's history on November 20, 2006, as Alfonso Soriano agreed to an eight-year contract worth $136 million, an average of $17 million per year.

On December 7, Josh Hamilton was drafted by the Chicago Cubs from the Tampa Bay Devil Rays in the 2006 rule 5 draft. Several hours later, Hamilton was purchased by the Cincinnati Reds from the Chicago Cubs.

The Cubs added two starting pitchers to the rotation, starting with the signing of Ted Lilly on December 15, 2006, to a four-year, $40 million deal. This was followed on December 19, 2006, with the signing of Jason Marquis to a three-year contract worth $21 million.

== Regular season ==
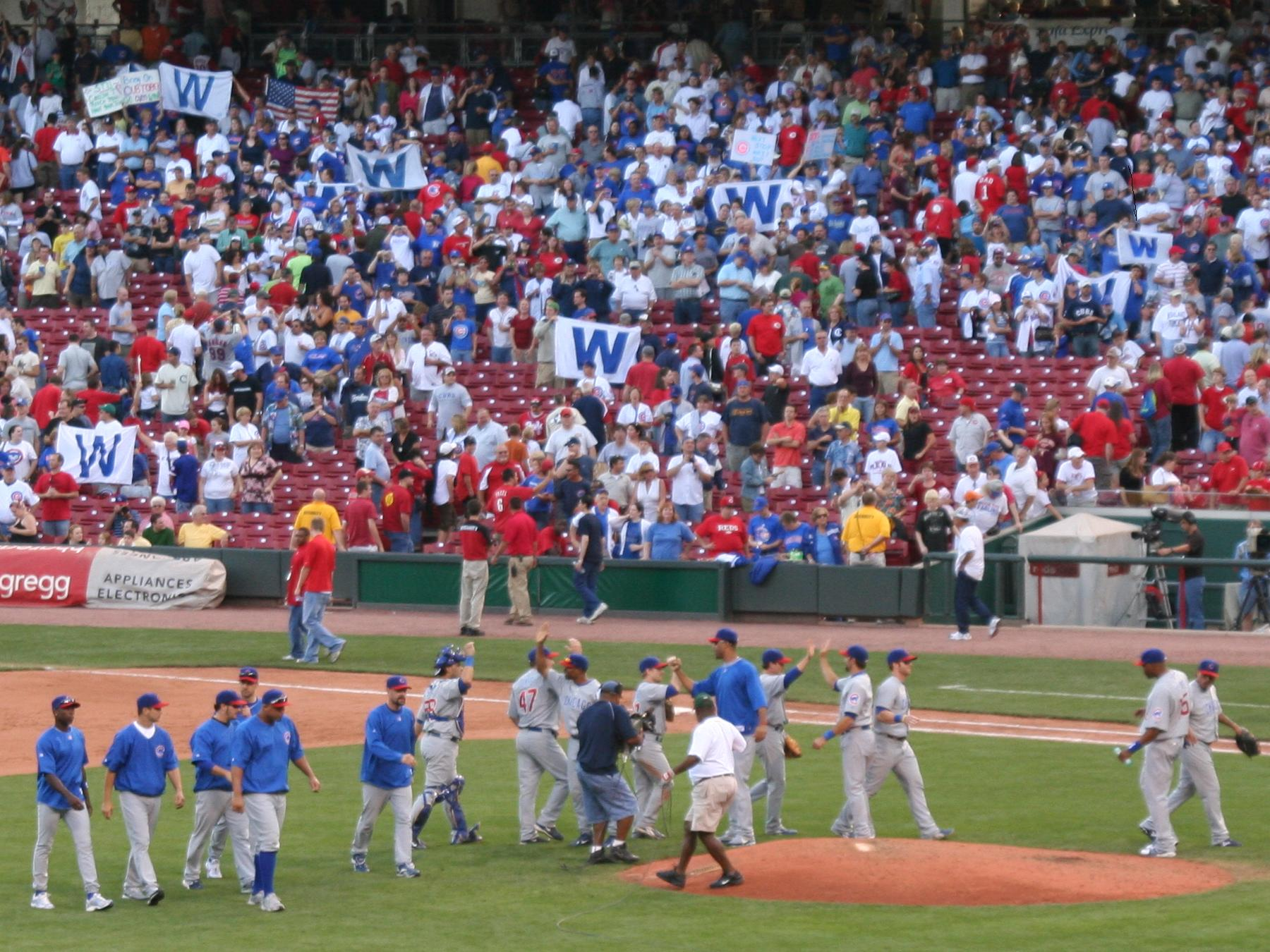
Cubs and fans celebrate the 2007 National League Central Championship. Cubs Win flags abound.

=== Season summary ===
The Cubs got off to a poor start after the first two months of the season, posting a 22–29 record going into a home series against the Atlanta Braves during the first weekend after Memorial Day. Derrek Lee led a players only meeting on May 30 attempting to turn around the team's poor performance. On the Friday start at Wrigley, Carlos Zambrano took the mound and the Cubs fell behind 7–1, including allowing five runs (four earned) in the fifth inning. Included in the inning was a passed ball and throwing error by catcher Michael Barrett. An altercation ensued between the pitcher and catcher in the dugout, in full view of the television camera crews. Zambrano was pulled from the game after the scuffle in which he gave up thirteen hits and had zero strikeouts, and Barrett was replaced by backup Koyie Hill.

On Saturday, the weekend series continued to be interesting, albeit outside of the boxscore. The Braves took an early 3–0 lead in the fourth inning against starting pitcher Rich Hill, but the Cubs clawed back with single runs in the fifth, sixth, and seventh innings, tying the game 3–3. The Braves regained the lead in the eighth against reliever Will Ohman, but in the bottom of the frame, rookie Ángel Pagán led off by lining a ball into the right-field corner, and stopped at second with a double. Two pitches later, Pagán attempted to advance to third on a wild pitch, but was thrown out on a close play. Both Piniella and third-base coach Mike Quade argued the call with umpire Mark Wegner, and Piniella began kicking dirt, throwing and kicking his cap until being thrown out of the game. Allegedly, Piniella kicked umpire Wegner, and was reported to the MLB offices by crew chief Bruce Froemming. Play was delayed for seven minutes while the grounds crew cleaned up debris in the outfield. The Cubs lost the game 5–3, worsening their record to a season-low nine games below .500 at 22–31. Piniella was suspended for four games for the incident, and later recognized that Wegner made the right call.

Two weeks later, Barrett was recorded having a heated discussion with starter Rich Hill. Questions quickly surfaced to the level of friction between the two players due to the recent incident with Zambrano, but both players indicated that there was no issue, rather frustration due to the opposing pitcher Jarrod Washburn hitting a hanging slider that put the Mariners up 3–2. The Cubs ultimately lost the game 5–3 in extra innings on another contentious play where Barrett dropped the ball on a throw to the plate. After the altercations with Zambrano and Hill, Barrett lost his role as the everyday catcher for the team. Just one week later, Barrett was traded to the San Diego Padres for catcher Rob Bowen.

The Cubs improved their play during the month of June, upping their record to 38–39 after a stretch of 16–8 after the Piniella ejection. They finished June with a key series at home against the first-place Milwaukee Brewers starting on June 29. Rich Hill once again took the mound, but gave up five runs in the first inning and lasted just three innings. The Cubs relievers kept the game close, but they still trailed 5–3 going into the bottom of the ninth against Francisco Cordero. Going into the game, Cordero led the league with 27 saves, and had blown only two. After retiring the first player in the inning, Cordero gave up back-to-back singles, and with runners at first and third allowing the potential winning run to come to the plate in the player of Derrek Lee. Lee hit a deep fly ball, but the wind knocked it down and was caught for a sacrifice fly. That made it two outs bringing third baseman Aramis Ramírez to the plate. Ramirez hit the first pitch into the left-center bleachers, winning the game 6–5. The victory pulled the Cubs back to .500, and trimmed the Brewers lead down to 6½ games. The Cubs ended the first half of the season 4.5 games out of first place, behind the Milwaukee Brewers, with a record of 44 wins and 43 losses.

The Chicago Cubs got off to a good start in the second half by sweeping the Houston Astros at home and taking three of four from the San Francisco Giants. In those series Ted Lilly won his third and fourth starts in a row, helping pitch the Cubs to 9–3 and 9–8 victories. On July 22, the Cubs passed the two-million attendance mark at Wrigley Field averaging over 40,000 fans per game at home through the first 49 games of the season and on pace to set a new home attendance record for the club. The Cubs spent a majority of July in hopes of claiming first place. After finishing the month with seventeen wins and nine losses, the team was merely half a game behind the Brewers by July 31. The Cubs won their final game in July and first game in August. The latter win, coupled with an earlier Brewers' loss, allowed the two teams to be tied for first place in the NL Central. However, the Cubs began to struggle in their next outings. They failed to win three consecutive series, and later temporarily lost Alfonso Soriano, Ángel Pagán, and Will Ohman to injuries. Despite the slump, the Cubs only managed to remain half a game behind the Brewers, who managed to lose thirteen of eighteen games. They closed out the final weeks of the season by having a successful home stand, where they won five of six games and took a three and a half game lead over the Brewers.

At their final home game, the Cubs' organization reported that they had set a franchise attendance record of 3,252,462 fans over the season.

During the month of June, the Cubs ended up winning seventeen games, making that their best month of the season: taking two of three from Milwaukee, two of three from the Seattle, sweeping the White Sox as well as the Rockies, and then taking another two of three games from Milwaukee. The Cubs won another seventeen games during that month; taking three of four from the Nationals, sweeping the Giants, two of three from the Cardinals, and two of three from the Phillies. During this three-month-long hot streak, the Cubs managed to sign Carlos Zambrano to a five-year, ninety million dollar contract. Also, the Cubs left fielder, Alfonso Soriano, was named the June National League player of the Month; followed by the Cubs ace, Carlos Zambrano, being named the National League Pitcher of the month. The team struggled throughout August, but managed to surpass the Milwaukee Brewers and win the division.

Going into the last week of the season, the Cubs won ten of twelve games and had a three-game lead over the Milwaukee Brewers. However, the Cubs dropped three in a row to the Florida Marlins, a team that the Cubs did not win a single game against during the whole season. Meanwhile, the Brewers lost two out of three, hurting their chance at taking over the top of the division. On September 28, thanks to a Cubs 6–0 win over the Cincinnati Reds and a Brewers 6–3 loss to the San Diego Padres, the Cubs clinched the NL Central division.

=== Postseason ===
The Cubs played the Arizona Diamondbacks in the National League Division Series. After falling 3–1 to Arizona on October 3 and an 8–4 loss on October 4, the Cubs returned on October 6 to Wrigley Field to lose the third game of the series by score of 5–1. The loss eliminated the Cubs from postseason play.

=== In-season trades ===
- On June 20, the Cubs traded catcher Michael Barrett to the San Diego Padres for catcher Rob Bowen and a minor league outfielder Kyler Burke.
- On July 16, the Cubs acquired Jason Kendall from the Oakland Athletics for fellow catcher Rob Bowen and minor league pitcher Jerry Blevins.
- On July 19, the Cubs traded César Izturis, along with a cash settlement, to the Pittsburgh Pirates.
- On August 23, the Cubs acquired Craig Monroe from the Detroit Tigers for Clay Rapada.
- On August 31, the Cubs acquired pitcher Steve Trachsel from the Baltimore Orioles for pitcher Rocky Cherry and third baseman Scott Moore.

=== First-year player draft ===
The Cubs selected high school third baseman Josh Vitters with the third overall pick of the 2007 MLB draft.

=== Season standings ===
==== National League Central ====
NL Central
Team	W	L	Pct.	GB	Home	Road
Chicago Cubs	85	77	.525	—	44‍–‍37	41‍–‍40
Milwaukee Brewers	83	79	.512	2	51‍–‍30	32‍–‍49
St. Louis Cardinals	78	84	.481	7	43‍–‍38	35‍–‍46
Houston Astros	73	89	.451	12	42‍–‍39	31‍–‍50
Cincinnati Reds	72	90	.444	13	39‍–‍42	33‍–‍48
Pittsburgh Pirates	68	94	.420	17	37‍–‍44	31‍–‍50

==== Record vs. opponents ====
2007 National League record Source: MLB Standings Grid – 2007
Team	AZ	ATL	CHC	CIN	COL	FLA	HOU	LAD	MIL	NYM	PHI	PIT	SD	SF	STL	WAS	AL
Arizona	—	4–2	4–2	2–4	8–10	6–1	5–2	8–10	2–5	3–4	5–1	5–4	10–8	10–8	4–3	6–1	8–7
Atlanta	2–4	—	5–4	1–6	4–2	10–8	3–3	4–3	5–2	9–9	9–9	5–1	5–2	4–3	3–4	11–7	4–11
Chicago	2–4	4–5	—	9–9	5–2	0–6	8–7	2–5	9–6	2–5	3–4	8–7	3–5	5–2	11–5	6–1	8–4
Cincinnati	4–2	6–1	9–9	—	2–4	4–3	4–11	2–4	8–7	2–5	2–4	9–7	2–4	4–3	6–9	1–6	7-11
Colorado	10–8	2–4	2–5	4–2	—	3–3	3–4	12–6	4–2	4–2	4–3	4–3	11–8	10–8	3–4	4–3	10–8
Florida	1–6	8–10	6–0	3–4	3–3	—	2–3	4–3	2–5	7–11	9–9	3–4	3–4	1–6	2–4	8–10	9–9
Houston	2–5	3–3	7–8	11–4	4–3	3-2	—	4–3	5–13	2–5	3–3	5–10	4–3	2–4	7–9	2–5	9–9
Los Angeles	10–8	3–4	5–2	4–2	6–12	3–4	3–4	—	3–3	5–5	4–2	5–2	8–10	10–8	3–3	5–1	5–10
Milwaukee	5–2	2–5	6–9	7–8	2–4	5–2	13–5	3–3	—	2–4	3–4	10–6	2–5	4–5	7–8	4–2	8–7
New York	4–3	9–9	5–2	5–2	2–4	11–7	5–2	5–5	4–2	—	6–12	4–2	2–4	4–2	5–2	9–9	8–7
Philadelphia	1-5	9–9	4–3	4–2	3–4	9–9	3–3	2–4	4–3	12–6	—	4–2	4–3	4–4	6–3	12–6	8–7
Pittsburgh	4–5	1–5	7–8	7–9	3–4	4–3	10–5	2–5	6–10	2–4	2–4	—	1–6	4–2	6–12	4–2	5–10
San Diego	8–10	2–5	5–3	4–2	8–11	4–3	3–4	10–8	5–2	4–2	3–4	6–1	—	14–4	3–4	4–2	6–9
San Francisco	8–10	3–4	2–5	3–4	8–10	6–1	4–2	8–10	5–4	2–4	4–4	2–4	4–14	—	4–1	3–4	5–10
St. Louis	3–4	4–3	5–11	9–6	4–3	4-2	9–7	3–3	8–7	2–5	3–6	12–6	4–3	1–4	—	1–5	6–9
Washington	1–6	7–11	1–6	6–1	3–4	10-8	5–2	1–5	2–4	9–9	6–12	2–4	2–4	4–3	5–1	—	9–9

=== Roster ===
2007 Chicago Cubs
**Roster**
**Pitchers**: 58 Rocky Cherry; 48,46 Neal Cotts; 46 Ryan Dempster; 47 Scott Eyre; 36 Sean Gallagher; 37 Ángel Guzmán; 55 Kevin Hart; 53 Rich Hill; 62 Bob Howry; 30,31 Ted Lilly; 21 Jason Marquis; 49 Carlos Mármol; 45 Sean Marshall; 52 Wade Miller; 13 Will Ohman; 56 Billy Petrick; 63 Carmen Pignatiello; 50 Clay Rapada; 52 Steve Trachsel; 34 Kerry Wood; 43 Michael Wuertz; 38 Carlos Zambrano	**Catchers**: 8 Michael Barrett; 24 Henry Blanco; 4 Rob Bowen; 55 Koyie Hill; 18 Jason Kendall; 58 Geovany Soto; **Infielders**: 5 Ronny Cedeño; 7 Mark DeRosa; 29,17 Mike Fontenot; 3 César Izturis; 25 Derrek Lee; 4 Scott Moore; 16 Aramis Ramírez; 2 Ryan Theriot; 32,12 Daryle Ward; **Outfielders**: 15,30 Cliff Floyd; 9 Jake Fox; 57 Sam Fuld; 11 Jacque Jones; 27 Craig Monroe; 19 Matt Murton; 29 Ángel Pagán; 3 Eric Patterson; 17,68 Félix Pie; 12 Alfonso Soriano	**Manager**: 41 Lou Piniella; **Coaches**: 59 Iván DeJesús (special asst); 28 Gerald Perry (hitting); 8 Mike Quade (third base); 40 Larry Rothschild (pitching); 39 Matt Sinatro (first base); 35 Lester Strode (bullpen); 6 Alan Trammell (bench)

=== Game log ===
2007 game log (85–77)
April: 10–14 (Home: 4–9; Away: 6–5)

#	Date	Opponent	Score	Win	Loss	Save	Attendance	Record	Box
1	April 2	@ Reds	5–1	Harang (1–0)	**Zambrano** (0–1)		42,720	0–1	
2	April 4	@ Reds	4–1	**Lilly** (1–0)	Arroyo (0–1)	**Dempster** (1)	25,965	1–1	
3	April 5	@ Reds	5–2	Santos (1–0)	**Howry** (0–1)	Weathers (1)	25,070	1–2	
4	April 6	@ Brewers	9–3	**Hill** (1–0)	Bush (0–1)		41,758	2–2	
5	April 7	@ Brewers	6–3	**Zambrano** (1–1)	Sheets (1–1)	**Dempster** (2)	41,282	3–2	
6	April 8	@ Brewers	9–4	Capuano (1–0)	**Miller** (0–1)		28,019	3–3	
7	April 9	Astros	5–3	Qualls (1–1)	**Howry** (0–2)	Wheeler (1)	41,388	3–4	
8	April 10	Astros	4–2	Sampson (1–0)	**Marquis** (0–1)		35,924	3–5	
–	April 11	Astros	Postponed (snow) Rescheduled for June 11						
9	April 13	Reds	6–5	Coffey (1–0)	**Zambrano** (1–2)	Weathers (4)	37,267	3–6	
10	April 14	Reds	7–0	**Hill** (2–0)	Arroyo (0–2)		38,598	4–6	
11	April 15	Reds	1–0	Lohse (1–0)	**Lilly** (1–1)	Weathers (5)	39,820	4–7	
12	April 16	Padres	12–4	**Marquis** (1–1)	Hensley (0–3)		32,126	5–7	
13	April 17	Padres	4–3 (14)	Brocail (1–0)	**Ohman** (0–1)	Hoffman (3)	36,021	5–8	
14	April 18	@ Braves	8–6	Villarreal (1–0)	**Eyre** (0–1)	Wickman (5)	26,837	5–9	
15	April 19	@ Braves	3–0	**Hill** (3–0)	Redman (0–3)	**Dempster** (3)	31,603	6–9	
16	April 20	Cardinals	2–1	Looper (3–1)	**Lilly** (1–2)	Isringhausen (4)	38,955	6–10	
17	April 21	Cardinals	6–0	**Marquis** (2–1)	Reyes (0–3)		41,637	7–10	
18	April 22	Cardinals	12–9 (10)	Isringhausen (1–0)	**Dempster** (0–1)		40,193	7–11	
19	April 23	Brewers	5–4 (12)	Villanueva (1–0)	**Cherry** (0–1)	Turnbow (1)	33,920	7–12	
20	April 24	Brewers	4–1	Suppan (2–2)	**Hill** (3–1)	Cordero (8)	34,382	7–13	
21	April 25	Brewers	9–3	**Lilly** (2–2)	Dessens (1–1)		38,581	8–13	
22	April 27	@ Cardinals	5–3	**Marquis** (3–1)	Reyes (0–4)	**Dempster** (4)	45,131	9–13	
23	April 28	@ Cardinals	8–1	**Zambrano** (2–2)	Wainwright (1–2)		45,015	10–13	
–	April 29	@ Cardinals	Postponed (death of Cardinals pitcher Josh Hancock) Rescheduled for September 15						
24	April 30	@ Pirates	3–2	Capps (2–0)	**Wuertz** (0–1)	Torres (8)	11,437	10–14	

May: 12–15 (Home: 6–6; Away: 6–9)

#	Date	Opponent	Score	Win	Loss	Save	Attendance	Record	Box
25	May 1	@ Pirates	8–6	**Cherry** (1–1)	Bayliss (2–2)	**Dempster** (5)	13,082	11–14	
26	May 2	@ Pirates	7–1	**Marquis** (4–1)	Snell (2–2)		21,765	12–14	
27	May 4	Nationals	6–4	**Zambrano** (3–2)	Bergmann (0–3)	**Dempster** (6)	39,444	13–14	
28	May 5	Nationals	5–3	**Hill** (4–1)	Patterson (1–5)	**Dempster** (7)	40,267	14–14	
29	May 6	Nationals	4–3 (10)	**Dempster** (1–1)	Wagner (0–2)		40,481	15–14	
30	May 8	Pirates	4–3 (15)	Bayliss (3–2)	**Cotts** (0–1)	Torres (10)	39,708	15–15	
31	May 9	Pirates	1–0	**Marquis** (5–1)	Gorzelanny (4–2)		40,264	16–15	
32	May 10	Pirates	6–4	Maholm (2–4)	**Zambrano** (3–3)	Torres (11)	41,101	16–16	
33	May 11	@ Phillies	7–2	Hamels (5–1)	**Hill** (4–2)		42,473	16–17	
34	May 12	@ Phillies	11–7	Alfonseca (2–1)	**Howry** (0–3)		45,026	16–18	
35	May 13	@ Phillies	4–1	**Lilly** (3–2)	Lieber (1–2)	**Dempster** (8)	45,129	17–18	
36	May 14	@ Mets	5–4	Heilman (4–2)	**Wuertz** (0–2)		34,033	17–19	
37	May 15	@ Mets	10–1	**Zambrano** (4–3)	Maine (5–1)		37,487	18–19	
38	May 16	@ Mets	8–1	Sosa (3–0)	**Hill** (4–3)		37,483	18–20	
39	May 17	@ Mets	6–5	Burgos (1–0)	**Dempster** (1–2)		42,667	18–21	
40	May 18	White Sox	6–3	**Lilly** (4–2)	MacDougal (1–1)	**Dempster** (9)	40,874	19–21	
41	May 19	White Sox	11–6	**Howry** (1–3)	Aardsma (2–1)		41,101	20–21	
42	May 20	White Sox	10–6	Masset (2–1)	**Zambrano** (4–4)		41,164	20–22	
43	May 22	@ Padres	5–1	Peavy (6–1)	**Hill** (4–4)	Hoffman (12)	26,192	20–23	
44	May 23	@ Padres	2–1	Wells (2–2)	**Marshall** (0–1)	Hoffman (11)	27,535	20–24	
45	May 24	@ Padres	3–1	**Howry** (2–3)	Meredith (1–2)	**Dempster** (10)	32,258	21–24	
46	May 25	@ Dodgers	9–8	Seánez (2–0)	**Ohman** (0–2)	Saito (15)	46,011	21–25	
47	May 26	@ Dodgers	4–2	**Zambrano** (5–4)	Hendrickson (2–2)	**Dempster** (11)	48,243	22–25	
48	May 27	@ Dodgers	2–1 (11)	Billingsley (3–0)	**Guzmán** (0–1)		51,198	22–26	
49	May 28	Marlins	5–3	Kim (3–2)	**Marshall** (0–2)	Gregg (5)	41,630	22–27	
50	May 29	Marlins	9–4	Willis (7–3)	**Marquis** (5–2)	Gregg (6)	39,788	22–28	
51	May 30	Marlins	9–0	Messenger (1–1)	**Lilly** (4–3)		36,699	22–29	

June: 17–11 (Home: 9–6; Away: 8–5)

#	Date	Opponent	Score	Win	Loss	Save	Attendance	Record	Box
52	June 1	Braves	8–5	Davies (1–1)	**Zambrano** (5–5)		39,523	22–30	
53	June 2	Braves	5–3	Yates (2–0)	**Ohman** (0–3)	Wickman (9)	40,290	22–31	
54	June 3	Braves	10–1	**Marshall** (1–2)	Cormier (0–1)		40,155	23–31	
55	June 4	@ Brewers	7–2	**Mármol** (1–0)	Bush (3–6)		35,760	24–31	
56	June 5	@ Brewers	7–5	Vargas (4–1)	**Lilly** (4–4)	Cordero (22)	38,535	24–32	
57	June 6	@ Brewers	6–2	**Zambrano** (6–5)	Suppan (7–6)		40,186	25–32	
58	June 7	@ Braves	2–1	**Hill** (5–4)	James (5–5)	**Dempster** (12)	32,902	26–32	
59	June 8	@ Braves	9–1	**Marshall** (2–2)	Cormier (0–2)		37,123	27–32	
60	June 9	@ Braves	9–5	Moylan (2–1)	**Marquis** (5–3)		51,816	27–33	
61	June 10	@ Braves	5–4	Paronto (3–1)	**Dempster** (1–3)	Wickman (11)	32,752	27–34	
62	June 11	Astros	2–1	**Zambrano** (7–5)	Williams (2–9)	**Dempster** (13)	37,947	28–34	
63	June 12	Mariners	5–3 (13)	O'Flaherty (3–0)	**Ohman** (0–4)	Putz (18)	40,071	28–35	
64	June 13	Mariners	3–2	**Marshall** (3–2)	Batista (7–5)	**Dempster** (14)	40,163	29–35	
65	June 14	Mariners	5–4	**Howry** (3–3)	Morrow (3–1)		39,846	30–35	
66	June 15	Padres	4–1	**Lilly** (5–4)	Wells (3–4)	**Dempster** (15)	40,479	31–35	
67	June 16	Padres	1–0	Bell (1–2)	**Zambrano** (7–6)	Hoffman (19)	41,632	31–36	
68	June 17	Padres	11–3	Maddux (6–3)	**Hill** (5–5)		40,964	31–37	
69	June 19	@ Rangers	5–4	**Mármol** (2–0)	Benoit (2–2)	**Dempster** (16)	38,290	32–37	
70	June 20	@ Rangers	7–3	Loe (3–6)	**Marquis** (5–4)		37,564	32–38	
71	June 21	@ Rangers	6–5	Gagné (2–0)	**Howry** (3–4)		38,406	32–39	
72	June 22	@ White Sox	5–1	**Zambrano** (8–6)	Buehrle (4–4)		39,046	33–39	
73	June 23	@ White Sox	2–1	**Wuertz** (1–2)	Jenks (2–3)	**Howry** (1)	39,043	34–39	
74	June 24	@ White Sox	3–0	**Marshall** (4–2)	Contreras (5–8)	**Howry** (2)	39,194	35–39	
75	June 25	Rockies	10–9	**Howry** (4–4)	Fuentes (0–2)		40,269	36–39	
76	June 26	Rockies	8–5	**Lilly** (6–4)	López (4–1)	**Ohman** (1)	40,121	37–39	
77	June 27	Rockies	6–4	**Zambrano** (9–6)	Hirsh (3–7)	**Mármol** (1)	39,972	38–39	
78	June 29	Brewers	6–5	**Howry** (5–4)	Cordero (0–2)		41,909	39–39	
79	June 30	Brewers	13–4	Sheets (10–3)	**Marshall** (4–3)		41,415	39–40	

July: 17–9 (Home: 9–4; Away: 8–5)

#	Date	Opponent	Score	Win	Loss	Save	Attendance	Record	Box
80	July 1	Brewers	5–1	**Marquis** (6–4)	Bush (6–7)		41,486	40–40	
81	July 2	@ Nationals	7–2	**Lilly** (7–4)	Simontacchi (5–6)		24,015	41–40	
82	July 3	@ Nationals	3–1	**Zambrano** (10–6)	Redding (0–1)	**Howry** (3)	30,106	42–40	
83	July 4	@ Nationals	6–0	Chico (4–5)	**Hill** (5–6)		39,207	42–41	
84	July 5	@ Nationals	4–2	**Ohman** (1–4)	Ayala (0–1)	**Howry** (4)	22,594	43–41	
85	July 6	@ Pirates	8–4	Maholm (5–11)	**Marquis** (6–5)		27,868	43–42	
86	July 7	@ Pirates	7–1	**Lilly** (8–4)	Van Benschoten (0–3)		33,293	44–42	
87	July 8	@ Pirates	6–2	Youman (2–0)	**Zambrano** (10–7)		22,470	44–43	
**All–Star Break (July 9–12)**
88	July 13	Astros	6–0	**Zambrano** (11–7)	Jennings (1–5)		41,593	45–43	
89	July 14	Astros	9–3	**Lilly** (9–4)	Oswalt (8–6)		41,448	46–43	
90	July 15	Astros	7–6	**Wuertz** (2–2)	Rodríguez (6–8)	**Howry** (5)	41,757	47–43	
91	July 16	Giants	3–2	**Hill** (6–6)	Correia (1–5)	**Howry** (6)	40,282	48–43	
92	July 17	Giants	4–2	Zito (7–9)	**Mármol** (2–1)	Hennessey (6)	41,102	48–44	
93	July 18	Giants	12–1	**Zambrano** (12–7)	Cain (3–11)	**Gallagher** (1)	39,792	49–44	
94	July 19	Giants	9–8	**Lilly** (10–4)	Morris (7–6)	**Howry** (7)	40,198	50–44	
95	July 20	D-backs	6–2	**Marquis** (7–5)	Webb (8–8)		41,071	51–44	
96	July 21	D-backs	3–2	Cruz (4–1)	**Howry** (5–5)	Valverde (29)	41,632	51–45	
97	July 22	D-backs	3–0	Petit (2–2)	**Marshall** (4–4)	Valverde (30)	41,705	51–46	
98	July 24	@ Cardinals	4–3	**Zambrano** (13–7)	Wells (4–13)	**Dempster** (17)	45,436	52–46	
99	July 25	@ Cardinals	7–1	**Lilly** (11–4)	Wainwright (9–8)		45,316	53–46	
100	July 26	@ Cardinals	11–1	Looper (8–8)	**Marquis** (7–6)		45,308	53–47	
101	July 27	@ Reds	5–4	Weathers (2–3)	**Howry** (5–6)		36,635	53–48	
102	July 28	@ Reds	8–1	**Marshall** (5–4)	Harang (10–3)		42,365	54–48	
103	July 29	@ Reds	6–0	**Zambrano** (14–7)	Belisle (5–8)		33,061	55–48	
104	July 30	Phillies	4–1	Hamels (12–5)	**Lilly** (11–5)	Myers (7)	41,686	55–49	
105	July 31	Phillies	7–3	**Marquis** (8–6)	Eaton (9–7)		40,495	56–49	

August: 12–16 (Home: 7–8; Away: 5–8)

#	Date	Opponent	Score	Win	Loss	Save	Attendance	Record	Box
106	August 1	Phillies	5–4	**Dempster** (2–3)	Myers (1–3)		40,558	57–49	
107	August 2	Phillies	10–6	Durbin (4–2)	**Marshall** (5–5)		40,988	57–50	
108	August 3	Mets	6–2	Mota (1–0)	**Dempster** (2–4)		41,512	57–51	
109	August 4	Mets	6–2	**Lilly** (12–5)	Maine (12–6)		41,412	58–51	
110	August 5	Mets	8–3	Glavine (10–6)	**Marquis** (8–7)		41,599	58–52	
111	August 6	@ Astros	2–1 (10)	Lidge (3–1)	**Wuertz** (2–3)		36,459	58–53	
112	August 7	@ Astros	5–2	Williams (6–12)	**Marshall** (5–6)	Lidge (7)	37,561	58–54	
113	August 8	@ Astros	8–2	Oswalt (12–6)	**Zambrano** (14–8)		41,655	58–55	
114	August 9	@ Rockies	10–2	**Lilly** (13–5)	Jiménez (1–2)		40,738	59–55	
115	August 10	@ Rockies	6–2	**Marquis** (9–7)	Cook (8–7)		41,282	60–55	
116	August 11	@ Rockies	15–2	Fogg (7–7)	**Hill** (6–7)		48,095	60–56	
117	August 12	@ Rockies	6–3	Herges (1–0)	**Wood** (0–1)	Corpas (9)	39,176	60–57	
118	August 14	Reds	6–5	Harang (12–3)	**Zambrano** (14–9)	Weathers (23)	40,750	60–58	
119	August 15	Reds	11–9	Bray (1–0)	**Howry** (5–7)	Weathers (24)	40,162	60–59	
120	August 16	Reds	12–4	**Marquis** (10–7)	Livingston (3–3)		40,372	61–59	
121	August 17	Cardinals	2–1	**Hill** (7–7)	Looper (10–10)	**Dempster** (18)	41,634	62–59	
122	August 18	Cardinals	5–3	**Marshall** (6–6)	Reyes (2–12)	**Dempster** (19)	41,369	63–59	
–	August 19	Cardinals	Postponed (rain) Rescheduled for September 10						
123	August 20	Cardinals	6–4	Piñeiro (4–2)	**Lilly** (13–6)	Isringhausen (23)	40,141	63–60	
124	August 21	@ Giants	5–1	**Eyre** (1–1)	Lincecum (7–4)		41,242	64–60	
125	August 22	@ Giants	4–2	**Mármol** (3–1)	Misch (0–3)	**Dempster** (20)	39,548	65–60	
126	August 23	@ Giants	4–1	Cain (6–13)	**Zambrano** (14–10)	Hennessey (13)	41,558	65–61	
127	August 24	@ D-backs	6–2	**Marshall** (7–6)	Owings (6–7)	**Dempster** (21)	36,700	66–61	
128	August 25	@ D-backs	3–1	Davis (11–11)	**Lilly** (13–7)	Valverde (39)	46,173	66–62	
129	August 26	@ D-backs	5–4	González (6–2)	**Marquis** (10–8)	Valverde (40)	38,902	66–63	
130	August 28	Brewers	5–3	**Hill** (8–7)	Linebrink (4–6)	**Dempster** (22)	40,884	67–63	
131	August 29	Brewers	6–1	Sheets (11–4)	**Zambrano** (14–11)		40,512	67–64	
132	August 30	Brewers	5–4	**Mármol** (4–1)	Capuano (5–12)	**Dempster** (23)	40,790	68–64	
133	August 31	Astros	6–1	Rodríguez (8–12)	**Marshall** (7–7)		41,297	68–65	

September: 17–12 (Home: 8–4; Away: 9–8)

#	Date	Opponent	Score	Win	Loss	Save	Attendance	Record	Box
134	September 1	Astros	4–3	**Marquis** (11–8)	Patton (0–2)	**Dempster** (24)	40,606	69–65	
135	September 2	Astros	6–5	**Mármol** (5–1)	Qualls (6–4)	**Dempster** (25)	41,415	70–65	
136	September 3	Dodgers	11–3	Loaiza (2–0)	**Zambrano** (14–12)		41,070	70–66	
137	September 4	Dodgers	6–2	Penny (15–4)	**Trachsel** (6–9)		37,834	70–67	
138	September 5	Dodgers	8–2	**Lilly** (14–7)	Stults (1–3)		39,559	71–67	
139	September 6	Dodgers	7–4	Beimel (4–1)	**Dempster** (2–5)	Saito (37)	39,397	71–68	
140	September 7	@ Pirates	6–1	Gorzelanny (14–7)	**Hill** (8–8)		24,489	71–69	
141	September 8	@ Pirates	5–1	**Zambrano** (15–12)	Snell (9–12)		33,373	72–69	
142	September 9	@ Pirates	10–5	Morris (9–9)	**Trachsel** (6–10)		21,861	72–70	
143	September 10	Cardinals	12–3	**Lilly** (15–7)	Piñeiro (5–4)		40,358	73–70	
144	September 11	@ Astros	5–4 (11)	Lidge (4–2)	**Dempster** (2–6)		33,493	73–71	
145	September 12	@ Astros	3–2	**Hill** (9–8)	Albers (4–8)	**Dempster** (26)	33,115	74–71	
146	September 13	@ Astros	6–2	**Trachsel** (7–10)	Williams (8–15)		34,234	75–71	
147	September 14	@ Cardinals	5–3	**Zambrano** (16–12)	Wainwright (13–11)	**Howry** (8)	45,750	76–71	
148	September 15	@ Cardinals	3–2	**Wood** (1–1)	Franklin (4–4)	**Dempster** (27)	45,918	77–71	
149	September 15	@ Cardinals	4–3	Piñeiro (6–4)	**Marshall** (7–8)	Isringhausen (29)	45,894	77–72	
150	September 16	@ Cardinals	4–2	**Marquis** (12–8)	Mulder (0–3)	**Dempster** (28)	45,735	78–72	
151	September 17	Reds	7–6	**Ohman** (2–4)	Weathers (2–6)		39,075	79–72	
152	September 18	Reds	5–2	Harang (16–4)	**Zambrano** (16–13)	Weathers (31)	40,801	79–73	
153	September 19	Reds	3–2	**Howry** (6–7)	Majewski (0–3)		40,805	80–73	
154	September 21	Pirates	13–8	**Eyre** (2–1)	Osoria (0–2)		41,591	81–73	
155	September 22	Pirates	9–5	**Hill** (10–8)	Duke (3–8)		41,271	82–73	
156	September 23	Pirates	8–0	**Zambrano** (17–13)	Gorzelanny (14–9)		41,364	83–73	
157	September 25	@ Marlins	4–2	Willis (10–15)	**Lilly** (15–8)	Tankersley (1)	16,044	83–74	
158	September 26	@ Marlins	7–4	Kensing (2–0)	**Marquis** (12–9)	Gardner (2)	19,051	83–75	
159	September 27	@ Marlins	6–4	Olsen (10–15)	**Trachsel** (7–11)	Gregg (31)	24,809	83–76	
160	September 28	@ Reds	6–0	**Zambrano** (18–13)	Arroyo (9–15)		32,193	84–76	
161	September 29	@ Reds	4–0	**Hill** (11–8)	Harang (16–6)		38,936	85–76	
162	September 30	@ Reds	8–4	Bailey (4–2)	**Dempster** (2–7)		32,620	85–77	

Legend: = Win = Loss = Postponement
**Bold** = Cubs team member

== Player stats ==
=== Batting ===
Note: G = Games played; AB = At bats; R = Runs; H = Hits; 2B = Doubles; 3B = Triples; HR = Home runs; RBI = Runs batted in; SB = Stolen bases; BB = Walks; AVG = Batting average; SLG = Slugging average

Player	G	AB	R	H	2B	3B	HR	RBI	SB	BB	AVG	SLG
Alfonso Soriano	135	579	97	173	42	5	33	70	19	31	.299	.560
Derrek Lee	150	567	91	180	43	1	22	82	6	71	.317	.513
Ryan Theriot	148	537	80	143	30	2	3	45	28	49	.266	.346
Aramis Ramírez	132	506	72	157	35	4	26	101	0	43	.310	.549
Mark DeRosa	149	502	64	147	28	3	10	72	1	58	.293	.420
Jacque Jones	135	453	52	129	33	2	5	66	6	34	.285	.400
Cliff Floyd	108	282	40	80	10	1	9	45	0	35	.284	.422
Matt Murton	94	235	35	66	13	0	8	22	1	26	.281	.438
Mike Fontenot	86	234	32	65	12	4	3	29	5	22	.278	.402
Michael Barrett	57	211	23	54	9	0	9	29	2	17	.256	.427
César Izturis	65	191	15	47	11	0	0	8	3	13	.246	.304
Félix Pie	87	177	26	38	9	3	2	20	8	14	.215	.33
Jason Kendall	57	174	21	47	10	1	1	19	0	19	.270	.356
Ángel Pagán	71	148	21	39	10	2	4	21	4	10	.264	.439
Daryle Ward	79	110	16	36	13	0	3	19	0	22	.327	.527
Koyie Hill	36	93	7	15	4	0	2	12	0	8	.161	.269
Ronny Cedeño	38	74	6	15	2	0	4	13	2	3	.203	.392
Geovany Soto	18	54	12	21	6	0	3	8	0	5	.389	.667
Henry Blanco	22	54	3	9	3	0	0	4	0	2	.167	.222
Craig Monroe	23	49	6	10	4	0	1	4	0	6	.204	.347
Rob Bowen	10	31	3	2	1	0	0	2	0	4	.065	.097
Jake Fox	7	14	3	2	2	0	0	1	0	1	.143	.286
Eric Patterson	7	8	0	2	1	0	0	0	0	0	.250	.375
Sam Fuld	14	6	3	0	0	0	0	0	0	3	.000	.000
Scott Moore	2	5	0	0	0	0	0	0	0	0	.000	.000
Pitcher totals	162	349	24	53	9	0	3	19	1	4	.152	.203
Team totals	162	5643	752	1530	340	28	151	711	86	500	.271	.422

=== Pitching ===
Note: W = Wins; L = Losses; ERA = Earned run average; G = Games pitched; GS = Games started; SV = Saves; IP = Innings pitched; H = Hits allowed; R = Runs allowed; ER = Earned runs allowed; BB = Walks allowed; SO = Strikeouts

Player	W	L	ERA	G	GS	SV	IP	H	R	ER	BB	SO
Carlos Zambrano	18	13	3.95	34	34	0	216.1	187	100	95	101	177
Ted Lilly	15	8	3.83	34	34	0	207.0	181	91	88	55	174
Rich Hill	11	8	3.92	32	32	0	195.0	170	89	85	63	183
Jason Marquis	12	9	4.60	34	33	0	191.2	190	111	98	76	109
Sean Marshall	7	8	3.92	21	19	0	103.1	107	52	45	35	67
Bob Howry	6	7	3.32	78	0	8	81.1	76	31	30	19	72
Michael Wuertz	2	3	3.48	73	0	0	72.1	64	30	28	35	79
Carlos Mármol	5	1	1.43	59	0	1	69.1	41	11	11	35	96
Ryan Dempster	2	7	4.73	66	0	28	66.2	59	36	35	30	55
Scott Eyre	2	1	4.13	55	0	0	52.1	59	26	24	35	45
Will Ohman	2	4	4.95	56	0	1	36.1	42	20	20	16	33
Ángel Guzmán	0	1	3.56	12	3	0	30.1	32	12	12	9	26
Kerry Wood	1	1	3.33	22	0	0	24.1	18	9	9	13	24
Steve Trachsel	1	3	8.31	4	4	0	17.1	25	16	16	7	11
Neal Cotts	0	1	4.86	16	0	0	16.2	15	9	9	9	14
Rocky Cherry	1	1	3.00	12	0	0	15.0	13	6	5	6	13
Sean Gallagher	0	0	8.59	8	0	1	14.2	19	15	14	12	5
Wade Miller	0	1	10.54	3	3	0	13.2	24	16	16	6	6
Kevin Hart	0	0	0.82	8	0	0	11.0	7	1	1	4	13
Billy Petrick	0	0	7.45	8	0	0	9.2	8	8	8	7	6
Carmen Pignatiello	0	0	4.50	4	0	0	2.0	3	1	1	0	3
Clay Rapada	0	0	0.00	1	0	0	0.1	0	0	0	0	0
Team totals	85	77	4.04	162	162	39	1446.2	1340	690	650	573	1211

== Playoffs ==
=== NLDS vs. Arizona Diamondbacks ===
Game	Score	Date	Starters	Time (ET)
1	Chicago Cubs 1 at Arizona Diamondbacks 3	October 3	Carlos Zambrano (ND) vs. Brandon Webb (1–0)	10:07 p.m.
2	Chicago Cubs 4 at Arizona Diamondbacks 8	October 4	Ted Lilly (0–1) vs. Doug Davis (1–0)	10:07 p.m.
3	Arizona Diamondbacks 5 at Chicago Cubs 1	October 6	Liván Hernández (1–0) vs. Rich Hill (0–1)	6:07 p.m.

== Farm system ==
Level	Team	League	Manager
AAA	Iowa Cubs	Pacific Coast League	Buddy Bailey
AA	Tennessee Smokies	Southern League	Pat Listach
A	Daytona Cubs	Florida State League	Jody Davis
A	Peoria Chiefs	Midwest League	Ryne Sandberg
A-Short Season	Boise Hawks	Northwest League	Tom Beyers
Rookie	AZL Cubs	Arizona League	Ricardo Medina
