= Koyie Hill =

American baseball player (born 1979)

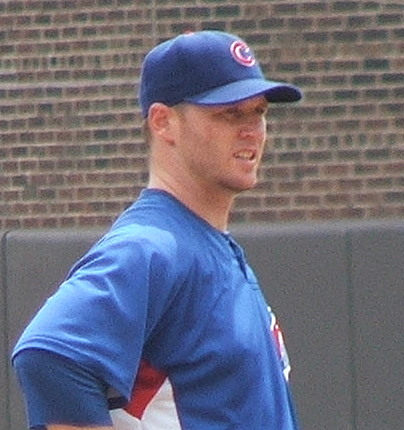
- Hill with the Chicago Cubs
- Catcher
- Born: March 9, 1979 (age 47); Tulsa, Oklahoma, U.S.
- Batted: Switch Threw: Right

MLB debut
- September 5, 2003, for the Los Angeles Dodgers

Last MLB appearance
- July 20, 2014, for the Philadelphia Phillies

MLB statistics
- Batting average: .207
- Home runs: 8
- Runs batted in: 77
- Stats at Baseball Reference

Teams
- Los Angeles Dodgers (2003); Arizona Diamondbacks (2004–2005); Chicago Cubs (2007–2012); Miami Marlins (2013); Philadelphia Phillies (2014)

Koyie Dolan Hill (pronounced 'Koy') (born March 9, 1979) is an American former professional baseball catcher. He played in Major League Baseball (MLB) for the Los Angeles Dodgers, Arizona Diamondbacks, Chicago Cubs, Miami Marlins, and Philadelphia Phillies. Hill resumed his playing career when he signed with the Kansas Stars in 2016.

== Baseball career ==
While attending Wichita State University, Hill compiled a .355 batting average and 186 RBI primarily as a third baseman.

In 1999, Hill played as the second baseman for Team USA. In the games, he totaled a .284 batting average, 3 home runs, and 21 RBI.

=== Los Angeles Dodgers ===
Hill made his debut in the Majors in 2003 with the Los Angeles Dodgers. However, at the time, all-star catcher Paul Lo Duca was cemented as the Dodgers catcher, making Hill expendable. On July 31, 2004, Hill was one of the most prominent names in a trade, going from the Dodgers to the Arizona Diamondbacks for veteran Steve Finley. He would go on to hit .250 with 1 home run and 6 RBI in 2004 before breaking his ankle in a collision at home plate.

=== Arizona Diamondbacks ===
In 2005, Hill began the season as the starting catcher for the Diamondbacks. His offense, however, did not perform at the level expected, as he would spend the majority of the year platooning with backup catcher Chris Snyder. Hill played in only 34 games in 2005, and many in the MLB community felt as though Diamondbacks manager Bob Melvin did not give Hill ample time to develop.

Koyie entered the Diamondbacks 2006 spring training locked in a battle with Snyder for the backup role to Johnny Estrada, a major off-season acquisition of the Diamondbacks. Although Hill compiled an impressive spring camp (15-30 for a .500 batting average), on April 2, Hill was designated for assignment.

=== New York Yankees ===
On April 6, 2006, the New York Yankees claimed Hill off waivers, only to designate him for assignment on April 14. On April 17, he accepted an outright assignment to the Yankees' Triple-A affiliate, the Columbus Clippers. Once the 2006 season concluded, Hill was released from the Yankees organization.

=== Chicago Cubs ===
On November 16, 2006, Hill signed a minor league contract with the Chicago Cubs.

On June 1, 2007, Hill was called up to replace the injured Henry Blanco. Hill saw action later that day as he was put into the game in the top of the sixth inning after Michael Barrett was taken out of the game after Barrett scuffled with teammate Carlos Zambrano. On August 20, Hill was designated for assignment. In 36 total appearances for the Cubs, he batted .161/.231/.269 with two home runs and 12 RBI.

The Cubs re-signed Hill to a minor league contract in the 2007 offseason so he could compete with Henry Blanco for the backup catcher role in spring training. On September 1, 2008, Hill's contract was purchased by the Cubs and he was called up to the expanded 40-man roster. In 10 games for the team, he went 2-for-21 (.095) with 1 RBI.

On March 30, 2009, the Cubs released veteran backstop Paul Bako, making Hill the Cubs' backup catcher. Following an injury to Geovany Soto on July 7, Hill became the Cubs' starting catcher; as of August 1, he had caught all but two-thirds of an inning of the Cubs' 21 games during that period. In 83 appearances for Chicago over the course of the season, Hill hit .237/.312/.324 with two home runs and a career-high 24 RBI.

Hill played in 77 games for the Cubs in 2010, hitting .214/.254/.298 with one home run and 17 RBI. In 46 appearances for the Cubs in 2011, Hill slashed .194/.269/.276 with two home runs and nine RBI. On December 12, 2011, Hill was non-tendered by the Cubs and became a free agent.

=== Cincinnati Reds ===
On January 10, 2012, Hill signed a minor league contract with the St. Louis Cardinals that included an invitation to Spring Training. He was released prior to the start of the season on March 25.

On April 29, 2012, Hill signed a minor league contract with the Cincinnati Reds organization. He played in 14 games for the Double-A Pensacola Blue Wahoos, slashing .195/.250/.342 with one home run and five RBI.

=== Chicago Cubs (second stint) ===
On May 19, 2012, Hill was traded to the Chicago Cubs. This happened after 3 of their catchers, Steve Clevenger, Geovany Soto, and Welington Castillo, all went down with injuries in a span of 24 days. In 11 games for Chicago, Hill went 7-for-39 (.180) with 1 RBI. On June 14, Hill was designated for assignment after Castillo was activated from the disabled list. He cleared waivers and was sent outright to the Triple-A Iowa Cubs on June 16. However, Hill rejected the assignment and elected free agency the following day.

=== Washington Nationals ===
On June 19, 2012, Hill signed a minor league contract with the Washington Nationals. In 31 appearances for the Triple-A Syracuse Chiefs, he batted .164/.226/.231 with two home runs, nine RBI, and one stolen base. Hill was released by the Nationals organization on August 12.

=== Texas Rangers ===
On August 13, 2012, Hill signed a minor league contract with the Texas Rangers. In 15 games for the Triple-A Round Rock Express, he batted .236/.300/.309 with one home run and three RBI. Hill was released by the Rangers organization on September 4.

=== Miami Marlins ===
On March 19, 2013, Hill signed a minor league contract with the Miami Marlins organization. On August 9, the Marlins selected Hill's contract, adding him to their active roster. In 18 games for Miami, he went 9-for-58 (.155) with 2 walks. On October 7, Hill was removed from the 40-man roster and sent outright to the Triple-A New Orleans Zephyrs, but he rejected the assignment and elected free agency.

=== Philadelphia Phillies ===
On February 4, 2014, Hill signed a minor league contract with the Washington Nationals. On March 17, Hill was traded to the Philadelphia Phillies in exchange for a player to be named later or cash considerations. On June 27, the Phillies selected Hill's contract, adding him to their active roster. In 10 games for Philadelphia, he went 5-for-21 (.238) with no home runs and one RBI. On July 21, Hill was removed from the 40-man roster and sent outright to the Triple-A Lehigh Valley IronPigs. He elected free agency on November 3.

On November 20, 2014, Hill re-signed with the Phillies organization on a minor league contract. He did not play in a game for the organization in 2015, and elected free agency on November 7, 2015.

== Table saw accident ==
On October 16, 2007, Hill was using a table saw to cut wood for a window frame. Part of the wood got caught in the saw, and the saw grabbed and his hand was in the way. The saw severed his thumb and severely cut into the other 4 fingers of his hand. His fingers were repaired, and after many months of therapy, he was able to regain motion in them.

== Personal life ==
Koyie Hill and his wife, Meghan, have two daughters, Phoenix and Charley, who were born on September 27, 2004, and fall 2008. Hill graduated from Eisenhower High School in Lawton, Oklahoma.
