= Pignatiello =

Pignatiello is a surname. Notable people with the surname include:

- Carlo Pignatiello (born 2000), Scottish footballer
- Carmen Pignatiello (born 1982), American baseball player
- Tony Pignatiello (born 1969), Canadian soccer player
- Delfina Pignatiello (born 2000), Argentine swimmer
