= Geovany Soto =

Puerto Rican baseball player (born 1983)

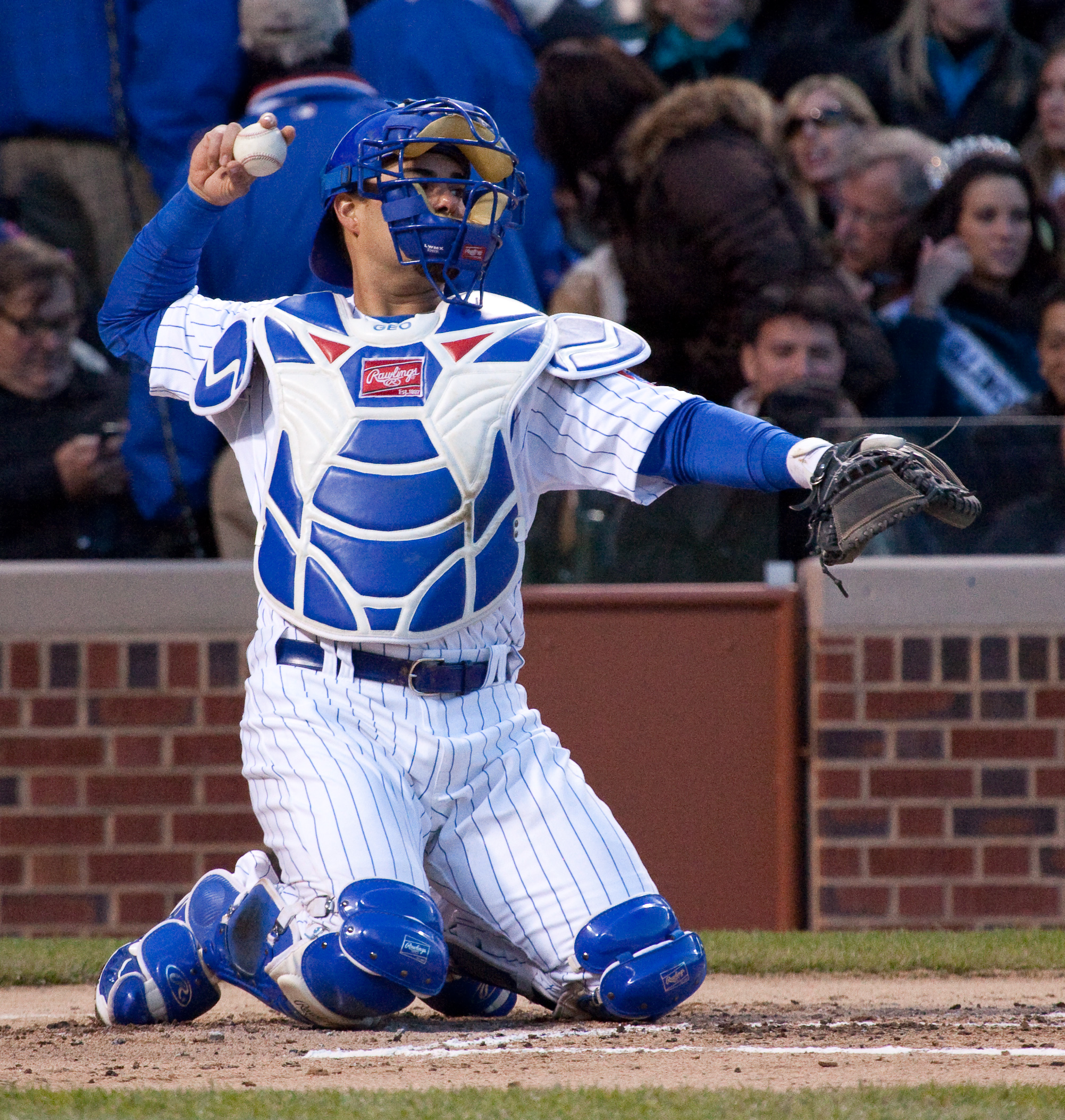
- Soto with the Chicago Cubs in 2010
- Catcher
- Born: January 20, 1983 (age 43); San Juan, Puerto Rico
- Batted: Right Threw: Right

MLB debut
- September 23, 2005, for the Chicago Cubs

Last MLB appearance
- May 7, 2017, for the Chicago White Sox

MLB statistics
- Batting average: .245
- Home runs: 108
- Runs batted in: 361
- Stats at Baseball Reference

Teams
- Chicago Cubs (2005–2012); Texas Rangers (2012–2014); Oakland Athletics (2014); Chicago White Sox (2015); Los Angeles Angels (2016); Chicago White Sox (2017)

Career highlights and awards
- All-Star (2008); NL Rookie of the Year (2008)

Geovany Soto (born January 20, 1983) is a Puerto Rican former professional baseball catcher. He played 13 seasons in Major League Baseball (MLB), most prominently as a member of the Chicago Cubs, where he appeared in the MLB All-Star Game and was named the National League Rookie of the Year in 2008. He also played for the Texas Rangers, the Oakland Athletics, the Los Angeles Angels and the Chicago White Sox.

== Professional career ==
=== Chicago Cubs ===
Selected by the Chicago Cubs 318th overall in the 11th round of the 2001 Major League Baseball draft, Soto made his major league debut on September 23, 2005, against the Houston Astros. He was recalled by the Cubs on July 12, 2007, but only had 1 hit in 7 at-bats. In September 2007, when the Cubs expanded their roster, he joined the team again. This was mainly because, in the minor leagues that year, he batted .353 with 26 home runs and 109 RBI and was named the Pacific Coast League's MVP while playing for the Iowa Cubs. After his call-up in September, Soto had an average of .389. Soto started for the Cubs during the 2007 playoff series against the Arizona Diamondbacks. In game 2 of the series, Soto hit a home run into the left field bleachers at Chase Field, giving the Cubs an early 2–0 lead. The Cubs ended up losing that game, but it further solidified him as the Cubs' full-time catcher going into 2008, with Jason Kendall moving on to Milwaukee as a free agent.

==== 2008 ====
Arguably the best offensive performance in Soto's career came April 30, 2008, in a rout against the Brewers. Soto hit two 3-run homers to account for 6 of the Cubs' 19 RBIs, only a few days removed from a two-game stretch against the Nationals in which he struck out in 8 consecutive at-bats. Soto was voted the National League Rookie of the Month for April 2008 after hitting .341 with 5 home runs, 8 doubles, and 20 RBIs, with an OPS of 1.059. On May 19, 2008, he scored his first career Inside-the-park home run against the Houston Astros. Soto led the early stage of the voting process for the National League's catcher in the 2008 Major League Baseball All-Star Game. He was selected to be the National League's starting catcher in the game. Soto became the first rookie catcher ever to start on the National League All-Star team. Soto is the first Cubs' All-Star rookie to play in the game with at least 14 home runs since Rafael Palmeiro did it in 1987, surpassing the mark when he hit his 15th home run on July 6, 2008. He went 3 for 5 with 7 RBIs in a game on August 26 against the Pittsburgh Pirates.

As a rookie catcher, Soto called a no-hitter game from behind the plate to pitcher Carlos Zambrano in a game against the Houston Astros on September 14, 2008. Played at Miller Park in Milwaukee due to Hurricane Ike moving through Houston, this was the first no-hitter in major league history pitched at a neutral site.

After the 2008 season, Soto was honored with the Sporting News Rookie of the Year Award and the Major League Baseball Rookie of the Year Award for the National League. Soto posted a .285 batting average, along with 23 home runs and 86 RBI's. Soto won the award in a landslide, receiving 31 of 32 first place votes. Soto is the first Cubs' backstop to play for multiple Cub playoff teams since Gabby Hartnett, and is the first to start playoff games in consecutive years since Johnny Kling. Soto also won the Pedrín Zorrilla Award, receiving unanimous support during the voting process. Orlando Cepeda was contacted to present the award, traveling to Puerto Rico for the ceremony.

==== 2009–2011 ====
Soto was unable to live up to huge expectations in 2009, only posting a .218 batting average and 47 RBI. In June 2009, Soto was revealed to have tested positive for marijuana at the World Baseball Classic. While the MLB did not take any disciplinary actions, the International Baseball Federation banned him from playing internationally for two years.

In 2010, Soto batted .280 with 17 home runs. In 2011, Soto batted .228 with 17 home runs. He led major league catchers in errors committed, with 13, and had the lowest fielding percentage, at .987.

=== Texas Rangers ===
On July 30, 2012, Soto was traded to the Texas Rangers for right-handed pitcher Jake Brigham. In 47 games with Texas in 2012, he hit .196 with 5 home runs and 25 RBI.

Soto spent 2013 as the backup catcher to A. J. Pierzynski. On June 4, 2013, Soto played his first career game at third base. On July 29, Soto hit a home run to win a game against the Angels. The Rangers entered the bottom of the ninth down by 1 before Pierzynski, the designated hitter, hit a solo home run to tie the game. In 54 games in 2013, Soto hit .245/.328/.466 with 9 home runs and 22 RBI. On November 5, Soto signed a one-year, $3.05 million deal with incentives with the Rangers to be their primary catcher.

Due to injuries to his knee and foot, Soto was on the disabled list for the first half of the 2014 season. On July 9, 2014, Soto was arrested on a charge of marijuana possession.

=== Oakland Athletics ===
On August 24, 2014, the Rangers traded Soto to the Oakland Athletics for cash considerations. He appeared in 11 games and batted .262 with 8 RBI.

=== Chicago White Sox ===
Soto signed a minor league 1-year deal with the Chicago White Sox on January 22, 2015. He hit 9 home runs and drove in 21 RBI in 78 games with the White Sox.

=== Los Angeles Angels ===
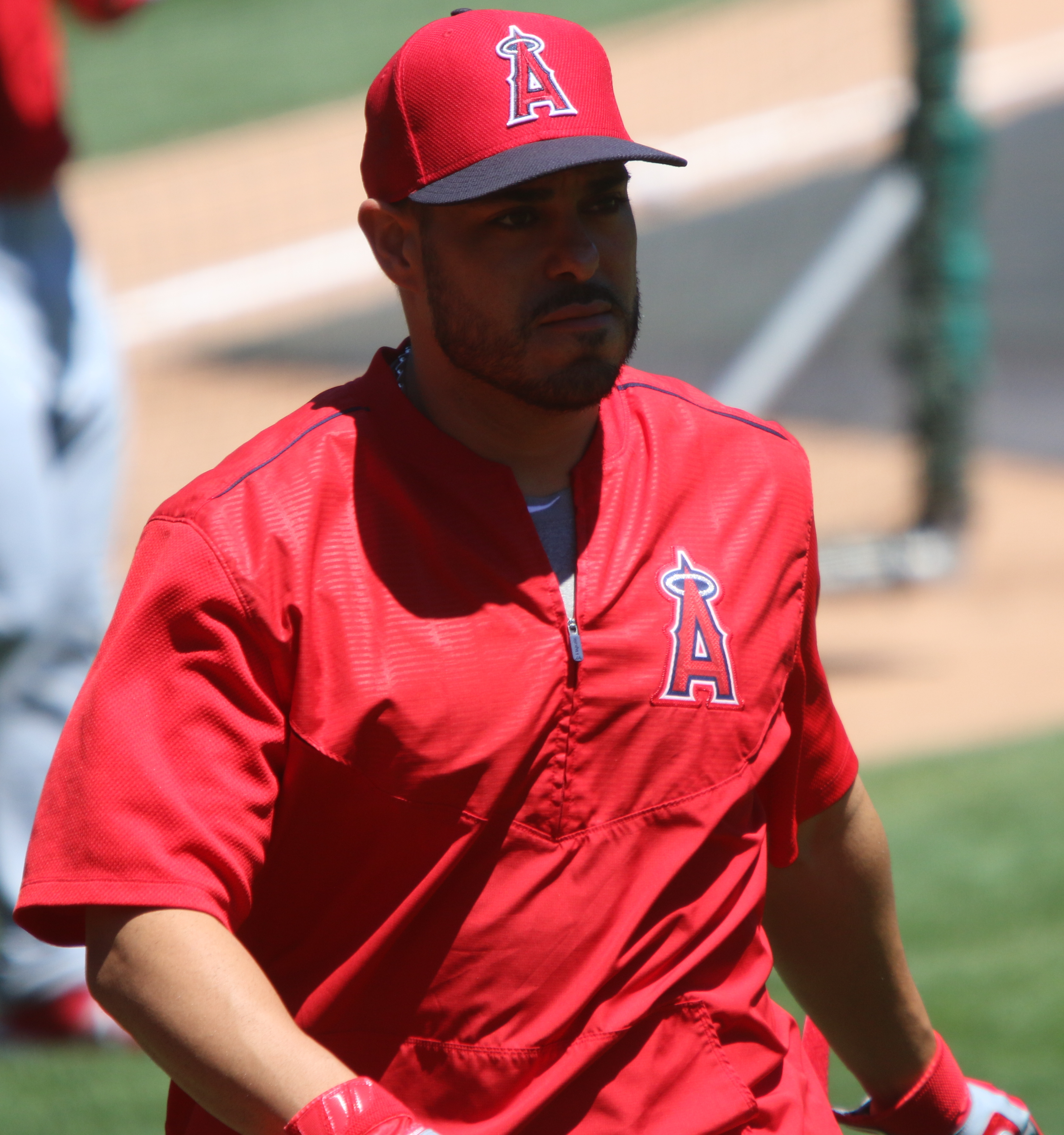
Soto with the Angels in 2016

On November 24, 2015, Soto signed a one-year $2.8 million contract with the Los Angeles Angels of Anaheim. He played in 26 games, with 86 at bats and 4 home runs.

=== Chicago White Sox (second stint) ===
Soto signed a minor league contract with the White Sox on January 6, 2017. Soto made the White Sox Opening Day roster. His contract also included a club option for the 2018 season. On April 6, Soto hit his first two home runs on the White Sox (three-run homer in the third inning and a solo home run in the seventh inning), his fourth career multi-home run game, his first since 2011 on the Chicago Cubs. He finished the game logging two hits, two runs, and four RBIs. On April 8, Soto hit a solo-home run in the sixth right after Matt Davidson hit a two-run homer. This was Soto's third of the season in four games. On April 13, Soto was placed on the 10-day disabled list because of an inflamed right elbow. On May 15, 2017, it was revealed that Soto would undergo surgery on his injured elbow for debridement, ruling him out for an additional three weeks. He elected free agency on November 2, 2017.

== See also ==
- List of Major League Baseball career putouts as a catcher leaders
- List of Major League Baseball players from Puerto Rico

Awards
| Preceded by Ryan Braun | Baseball America Rookie of the Year; 2008 | Succeeded by Andrew McCutchen |
| Preceded by Ryan Braun | Sporting News NL Rookie of the Year; 2008 | Succeeded by J. A. Happ |
| Preceded by Ryan Braun | Baseball Prospectus Internet Baseball NL Rookie of the Year; 2008 | Succeeded by Incumbent |
| Preceded by Ryan Braun | Players Choice NL Most Outstanding Rookie; 2008 | Succeeded by Incumbent |
| Preceded by Carlos Ruiz | Topps Rookie All-Star Catcher; 2008 | Succeeded by Omir Santos |
