= Michael Barrett (baseball) =

American baseball player (born 1976)

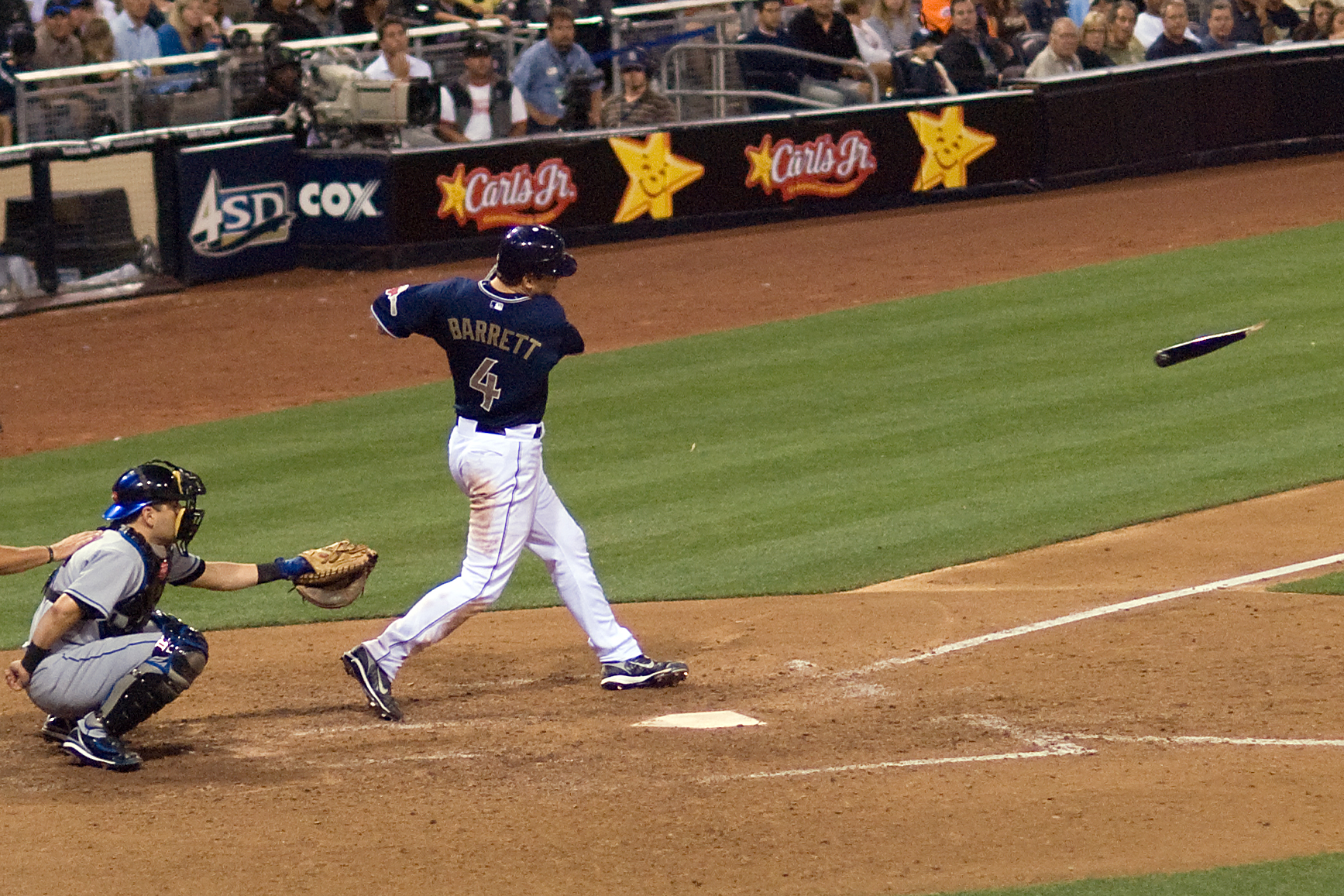
- Barrett batting for the Padres in 2007
- Catcher
- Born: October 22, 1976 (age 49); Atlanta, Georgia, U.S.
- Batted: Right Threw: Right

MLB debut
- September 19, 1998, for the Montreal Expos

Last MLB appearance
- April 17, 2009, for the Toronto Blue Jays

MLB statistics
- Batting average: .263
- Home runs: 98
- Runs batted in: 424
- Stats at Baseball Reference

Teams
- Montreal Expos (1998–2003); Chicago Cubs (2004–2007); San Diego Padres (2007–2008); Toronto Blue Jays (2009)

Career highlights and awards
- Silver Slugger Award (2005)
Medals
Men's baseball
Representing United States
World Junior Baseball Championship
Silver medal – second place	1994 Brandon	Team

Michael Patrick Barrett (born October 22, 1976) is an American former professional baseball player and current catching coordinator for the Washington Nationals of Major League Baseball (MLB). He played in MLB as a catcher and started his professional career with the Montreal Expos at age 18. Barrett spent three years playing in Minor League Baseball as a shortstop and catcher. He played with the Honolulu Sharks, West Palm Beach Expos, and Delmarva Shorebirds, and was elected to two Minor League All-Star games. Barrett made his MLB debut in 1998 as a third baseman, but was shortly outrighted to the minor leagues to play with the Harrisburg Senators for a season.

Upon Barrett's return to MLB in 1999, he ranked among the top offensive rookies in various statistical categories. Barrett failed to stay healthy during the 2003 season, which prompted the Expos to trade him to the Oakland Athletics, who in turn, traded him to the Chicago Cubs. During his tenure with the Cubs, Barrett won a Silver Slugger Award in 2005, and recorded near career-high statistics in 2004 season. The Cubs traded Barrett to the San Diego Padres in June of 2007. Barrett sustained two major injuries, which caused him to miss 115 games with the Padres, and was subsequently released after the 2008 season. Barrett attempted to make a comeback with the Toronto Blue Jays in 2009, but continued to struggle with injury issues, which led to his release in the subsequent offseason. He spent the second half of the 2010 season in the New York Mets minor league system. Barrett was also a volunteer assistant coach for the baseball team at the University of North Georgia.

== Early years ==
Barrett was born in Atlanta. He attended Pace Academy, where he excelled in baseball. During his senior year, Barrett won Atlanta's Gatorade's Player of the Year, and was named to the All-USA High School and First Team High School All-Americans All-star teams. He was considered to be one of the top draft prospects that year, and declared eligibility for the upcoming Major League Baseball draft shortly after graduating from high school. Barrett initially signed a letter of intent to play college baseball at Clemson. The Montreal Expos selected Barrett as the 28th overall selection in the 1995 draft. He spent the next three years in the minors, playing in the Gulf Coast, South Atlantic, Hawaii Winter Baseball, and Florida State Leagues, during which he was converted from a shortstop to a catcher. His Minor League Baseball career was highlighted in 1996, when he scored 57 runs and recorded 113 hits as a member of the Delmarva Shorebirds.

== Professional career ==
=== Montreal Expos (1998–2003) ===
The Expos called Barrett up to MLB on September 19, 1998, in a game against the Philadelphia Phillies as a third baseman. He managed to hit a home run and a single in the game. After only playing eight games as an Expo, Barrett was sent to play for the Harrisburg Senators, a Class AA team from the Eastern League. He recorded 145 hits, 78 runs, 19 home runs, and 87 RBI en route to winning the Double-A All-Star Catcher and Montreal Expos Minor League Player of the Year awards. His performance allowed him to claim a spot on the Expos' starting roster during the 1999 season. During his first full season, Barrett had 59 starts as a catcher, 62 as a third-baseman, and six as shortstop. He also led all National League rookies with 32 doubles, while ranking as one of top statistical tiers in runs, hits, and runs batted in amongst all other rookies.

Barrett struggled to perform consistently in the 2000 season. He committed 15 errors during the course of the season, resulting in a .891 fielding percentage. In addition, he hit for only a .214 batting average, with a .288 slugging percentage. These difficulties combined to prompt the Expos to send him to the minors again. After playing 30 games with the Ottawa Lynx of the International League, Barrett returned to the major leagues before 2001. He was named onto the team's opening day lineup, and eventually earned a full-time spot on the team. He was one of the Expos' most consistent hitters, and posted career high statistics that season; leading all National League catchers with 33 doubles. Barrett also managed to improve his defensive performance by raising his fielding percentage to .993, while committing only seven errors.

He also saw success during the 2002 season. Barrett started the season by hitting home runs in the first two games of the season. He would go on to have one of his best months in the Majors, scoring with four home runs, 17 RBI, eight doubles, and scored 10 runs. The League recognized his efforts, and named Barrett the "National League co-Player of the Week" for the second week of April after he recorded a franchise record 11 RBI within two games. Barrett finished the season with mixed results. While increasing his number of stolen bases and batting and slugging percentage, he failed to record as many runs, hits, and RBI, as he did in the previous season. He committed nine errors, which resulted in a lower fielding percentage, but excelled at throwing out base runners.

Barrett missed almost half of the 2003 on account of three injuries. He suffered the first during a game against the Colorado Rockies, during which one of Steve Reed's pitches accidentally hit and bruised Barrett's index finger. During this period, Barrett began to complain about tightness in his right hip flexor. This ailment took its toll on Barrett during a game against the Atlanta Braves, when he strained the muscles while taking a checked swing. The Expos sent Barrett on a rehabilitation assignment to play with the Edmonton Trappers, a AAA team from the Pacific Coast League. He only managed to play two games with team before fracturing his index finger on August 9. Barrett returned to the major leagues on September 12, although the Expos were already out of playoff contention.

=== Chicago Cubs (2004–2007) ===
Barrett's long tenure with the Expos ended in December 2003. The team traded Barrett to the Oakland Athletics in exchange for minor league pitcher Brett Price. The Athletics then traded Barrett to the Chicago Cubs for Damian Miller, only days after the initial transaction. Barrett, who had just spent six days with three teams, shortly signed a one-year contract with the Cubs, which was worth nearly $1.55 million. He first practiced with the Cubs during their annual spring training sessions, and reported receiving a cold reception from teammates. Barrett went on to become one of their top hitters during the 2004 season. He played a crucial role in their wild card chase; Barrett maintained a .287 batting average and hit 16 home runs and 65 RBI during the 2004 season. He finished the season as one of the league's top defensive catchers (fielding at a .994 clip with six errors), and led the Cubs in triples and sacrifice flies. Barrett was involved in two incidents with Houston Astros pitcher Roy Oswalt during the 2004 season. On August 22, Oswalt beaned Barrett. Barrett, believing the pitch was a reaction to a three-run home run that Aramis Ramírez had previously hit, confronted Oswalt, and prompted both teams to take the field. Oswalt was ejected from the game, as the Astros went on to lose 11–6. Five days later, during another Cubs-Astros game, Barrett mouthed off to Oswalt and attempted to confront him. The game's umpires restrained the two before a fight could break out, but not before both benches cleared out. Oswalt remained in the game, and defeated the Cubs 15–7. In a post-game press conference, Barrett condemned Oswalt's actions, and stated, "We're going to see him again."

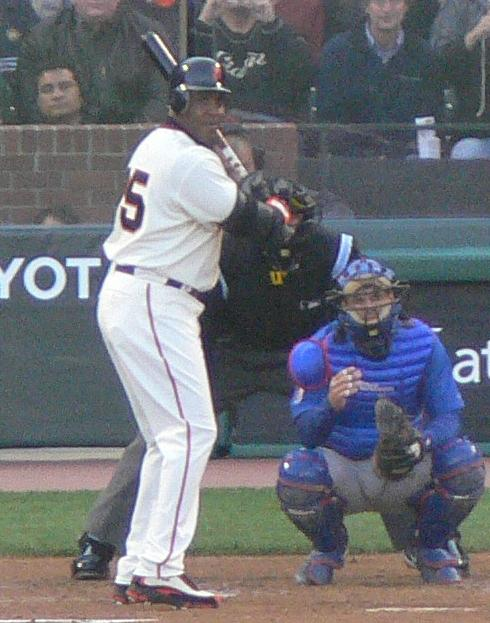
Barrett (right) on defense

Barrett continued to be one of the Cubs’ most consistent hitters in the 2005 season. He batted over .300 in three months of the season, and finished with 16 home runs, 32 doubles, and 61 RBI. Although he failed to meet and surpass the same statistical figures in the previous season, Barrett received a Silver Slugger Award for his efforts. Additionally, Barrett was selected to represent the United States in the 2006 World Baseball Classic. He played in four games, and recorded one run batted in.

Barrett sought to improve his numbers in the 2006 season, but ran into several obstacles. On May 20, 2006, Barrett was involved in an infamous altercation with A. J. Pierzynski during the Chicago Crosstown Classic between the Chicago White Sox and Cubs. During the game's second inning, Brian Anderson hit a sacrifice fly, which allowed Pierzynski to score the game's first run. Pierzynski collided with Barrett en route to home plate, causing Barrett to fall down. Pierzynski showed his enthusiasm by slapping home plate. As Pierzynski got up, he bumped into Barrett, who proceeded to punch him. Scott Podsednik came to Pierzynski's aid and subdued Barrett. Anderson and John Mabry eventually joined the brawl before both teams emptied their dugouts and stormed the field. The game's umpires ejected Barrett, Pierzynski, Anderson, and Mabry. Barrett later received a ten-game suspension, while Pierzynski was fined. Additionally, Anderson and the Sox' third base coach were also suspended for a fewer number of games. The Cubs went on to lose the game by a score of 7–0. On June 30, the two met during batting practice, and made amends. Barrett rebounded after the incident, and batted over .300 in the final four months of the season. He suffered an intrascrotal hematoma in early September, and was forced to miss the rest of the season. The injury and suspension caused Barrett to miss a significant portion of the season. In his shortened season, Barrett hit 16 home runs, which matched his previous career high, and nearly surpassed his hit total from 2005.

During the 2007 Chicago Cubs season, Barrett was involved in another altercation with teammate Carlos Zambrano. During a game against the Atlanta Braves on June 1, tensions began to rise between the two players when the Cubs allowed the Braves to score five runs in the fifth inning. The Braves recorded 20 hits, en route to winning 8–5. Barrett and Zambrano engaged in a heated conversation upon returning to the dugout, which escalated into a small fight. After Lou Piniella dismissed the two from the game, another fight ensued within the Cubs’ clubhouse, and Zambrano punched Barrett's lip. The wound required Barrett to go to the hospital immediately and receive stitches. Zambrano remorsefully admitted he was at fault after the ordeal, and Barrett later stated they had resolved their differences. Both players received fines for undisclosed amounts of money.

=== San Diego Padres (2007–2008) ===
Various news sources reported that the Cubs had traded Barrett to the San Diego Padres on the morning of June 20. The Cubs officially confirmed these details in the afternoon, and revealed that Barrett was traded in exchange for Rob Bowen and Kyler Burke. Despite stating he had no knowledge of the trade until hearing rumors in the morning, Barrett expressed his appreciation and well wishes to the Cubs organization on his homepage. He received a one-game suspension on July 22, after arguing with an umpire over a third strike. Barrett sustained a concussion on August 5, after a base-running accident against the San Francisco Giants. The Padres placed Barrett on the fifteen-day disabled list. After returning from the injury, Barrett's performance declined. His batting average dropped from .266 to .244, while he produced near career low statistics.

Barrett became a free agent after the end of the season, but was offered arbitration from the Padres. The Tampa Bay Rays expressed interest in signing Barrett, even though the signing would involve trading the Padres a future second round draft pick as compensation. Barrett accepted the Padres' arbitration offer on December 7. The Padres placed Barrett on the disabled list on April 8, 2008, after he sustained an elbow injury. The team later activated him on May 25, after he had recovered, and completed a minor league rehabilitation assignment. On July 2, 2008, Barrett was rushed to the hospital after fouling a pitch off his face. He required surgery to repair the damage, and had been placed on the disabled list for the second time in 2008. The Padres waived Barrett on October 11, after he previously expressed interest in testing the free-agent market.

=== Toronto Blue Jays (2009) ===
On December 29, 2008, Barrett signed a Minor League deal with the Toronto Blue Jays, and attended spring training as a non-roster invitee. He earned the back-up catcher role for the Toronto Blue Jays during spring training. He was scheduled to back up Rod Barajas, but Barrett tore a muscle in his right shoulder while attempting to retrieve a wild pitch on April 17, 2009. Barrett was placed on the 15-day disabled list on April 18, and was expected to return within the two weeks. Prior to the injury, Barrett had made seven appearances with a .167 batting average. The Blue Jays activated Barrett from the disabled list on July 6, 2009, and designated to Triple-A for a rehab assignment, where he sustained a season-ending injury. The Jays never recalled Barrett to their roster after the designation, and released him in the following offseason. He only played seven Major League games in 2009, in which he recorded a .167 batting average, three hits, and one home run.

=== New York Mets (2010) ===
Barrett signed a minor league deal with the Mets on June 29, 2010, and was assigned to the Class-A St. Lucie Mets. In early August, he was reassigned to play for their Class AAA affiliate, the Buffalo Bisons. On November 6, Barrett elected and was granted free agency.

== Post-playing career ==
On December 20, 2013, the Washington Nationals named Barrett the manager of the Gulf Coast League Nationals. Barrett has also served as the catching coordinator for the Nationals since 2015.

== Personal life ==
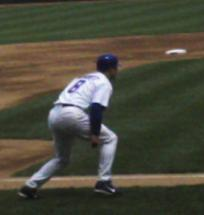
Barrett leads off at third base

Barrett is married with 4 children. His cousin, Scott Fletcher, also played for the Cubs, along with many other teams over his fifteen-year career. Barrett has spent a considerable portion of his personal life devoted to helping children. He runs several youth baseball programs, including one in Hawaii, which was inspired from his tenure with the Hawaiian Winter Baseball League. He also works with the Make-A-Wish Foundation and the Cubs Care Program to help lesser fortunate and sick children. More recently, he has worked with Kerry Wood and Ryan Dempster to raise money to help Derrek Lee's daughter and research for Leber's congenital amaurosis. Michael Barrett donated $50,000 to Project 3000 and pledged an additional sum of money for every home run he hits. Barrett was also a regular guest on FOX Chicago's The Final Word television show, which was co-hosted by Tom Waddle, a former Chicago Bears wide receiver.
