= Rob Bowen =

American baseball player (born 1981)

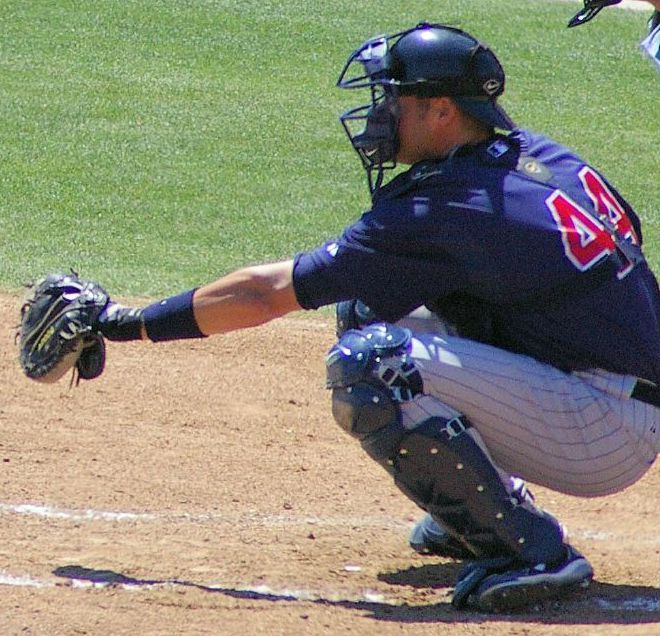
- Bowen with the Minnesota Twins during spring training in 2006
- Catcher
- Born: February 24, 1981 (age 45); Bedford, Texas, U.S.
- Batted: Left Threw: Right

MLB debut
- September 1, 2003, for the Minnesota Twins

Last MLB appearance
- September 24, 2008, for the Oakland Athletics

MLB statistics
- Batting average: .209
- Home runs: 9
- Runs batted in: 43
- Stats at Baseball Reference

Teams
- Minnesota Twins (2003–2004); San Diego Padres (2006–2007); Chicago Cubs (2007); Oakland Athletics (2007–2008)

Robert McClure Bowen (born February 24, 1981) is an American former professional baseball player. He played in Major League Baseball as a catcher from 2003 to 2008 for the Minnesota Twins, San Diego Padres, Chicago Cubs and the Oakland Athletics.

== Early life ==
Bowen attended Homestead High School in Fort Wayne, Indiana. His senior year (1999), he earned All-State honors and was named the Indiana State Player of the Year by Gatorade and USA Today.

== Career ==
=== Minnesota Twins ===
Shortly after graduating from Homestead, Bowen was drafted by the Minnesota Twins in the second round of the 1999 amateur draft, and made his debut with the Twins as a September call-up in 2003. He combined to play 24 games in the 2003 & 2004 seasons before spending the entire 2005 season in the Twins' farm system.

=== Detroit Tigers ===
During spring training 2006, he was placed on waivers by the Twins, and selected by the Detroit Tigers.

=== San Diego Padres ===
Later the same spring, he was again placed on waivers, and was this time claimed by the San Diego Padres.

=== Chicago Cubs ===
On June 20, 2007, the Chicago Cubs acquired Bowen and minor league outfielder Kyler Burke from the Padres in exchange for catcher Michael Barrett.

=== Oakland Athletics ===
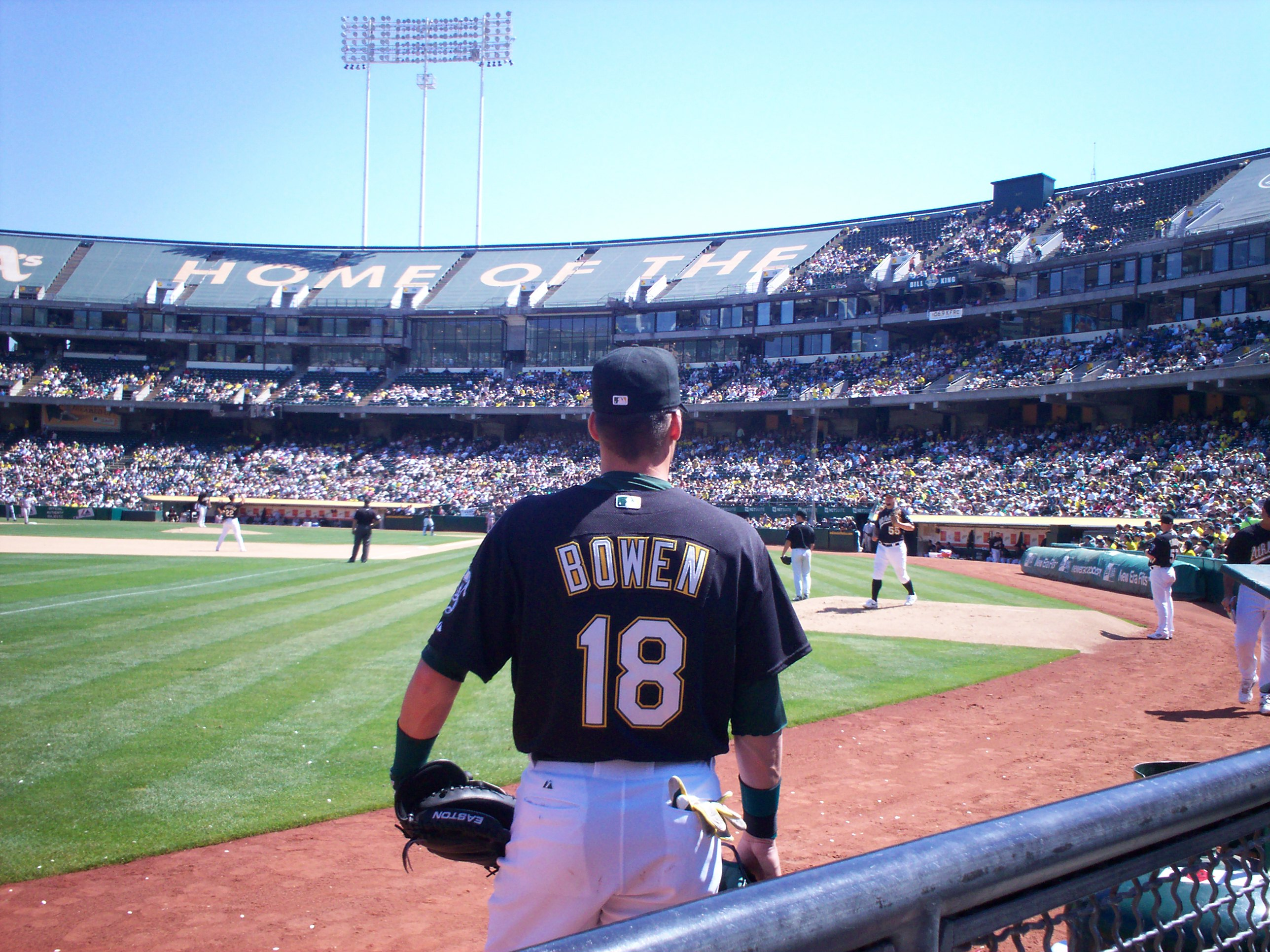
Bowen with the Athletics in 2008

Bowen was designated for assignment by Chicago and traded to the Oakland Athletics in exchange for fellow catcher Jason Kendall on July 16 of that year. He was released by the Oakland Athletics on March 17, 2009.

== Personal life ==
As of 2019, Bowen had been working as a K-9 handler for the Dooly County Sheriff's office in Georgia.
