= Carmen Pignatiello =

American baseball player (born 1982)

- Pitcher
- Born: September 12, 1982 (age 43); Hammond, Indiana, U.S.
- Batted: Right Threw: Left

MLB debut
- August 16, 2007, for the Chicago Cubs

Last MLB appearance
- April 7, 2008, for the Chicago Cubs

MLB statistics
- Win–loss record: 0–0
- Earned run average: 6.75
- Strikeouts: 3
- Stats at Baseball Reference

Teams
- Chicago Cubs (2007–2008)
Medals
Men's baseball
Representing United States
World Junior Baseball Championship
Gold medal – first place	1999 Kaohsiung	Team
World Youth Baseball Championship
Gold medal – first place	1998 Fairview Heights	Team

Carmen Peter Pignatiello (born September 12, 1982) is an American former Major League Baseball relief pitcher and independent league pitching coach. He is a graduate of Providence Catholic High School in New Lenox, Illinois. He is currently working as an insurance agent in Illinois.

== Professional career ==
=== Minor league career ===
Drafted by the Chicago Cubs in the 20th round of the 2000 MLB amateur draft, Pignatiello would spend seven seasons in various ranks within the farm system before being promoted in 2007, his eighth season in professional baseball. In 2003, he led the Florida State League with a career-high 140 strikeouts in 156.1 innings for the Daytona Cubs.

=== Major league career ===
Pignatiello was called up by the Cubs on August 14, 2007, due to the need for left-handed relievers in the bullpen. Two days later, he made his major league debut against the Cincinnati Reds and pitched one scoreless inning of relief of a 12–4 victory. In March, 2009 Carmen was signed to a minor league contract with the Minnesota Twins. Then released by the Twins, Pignatiello signed with the Schaumburg Flyers for the 2009 season as a starter, which saw him have a less-than-stellar season, going 6–9 in 20 starts with a 5.87 ERA. Following the season, Pignatiello retired.

=== Coaching career ===
On February 16, 2011, Pignatiello signed a contract with the Joliet Slammers to be their pitching coach.

=== Life After baseball ===
Pignatiello is currently working as a Nationwide insurance agent in Palos Heights, Illinois.

=== Personal life ===
He is married, and has two sons. The Pignatiello family lives in Wheaton, Illinois.
