= Carlos Zambrano =

Venezuelan baseball player (born 1981)

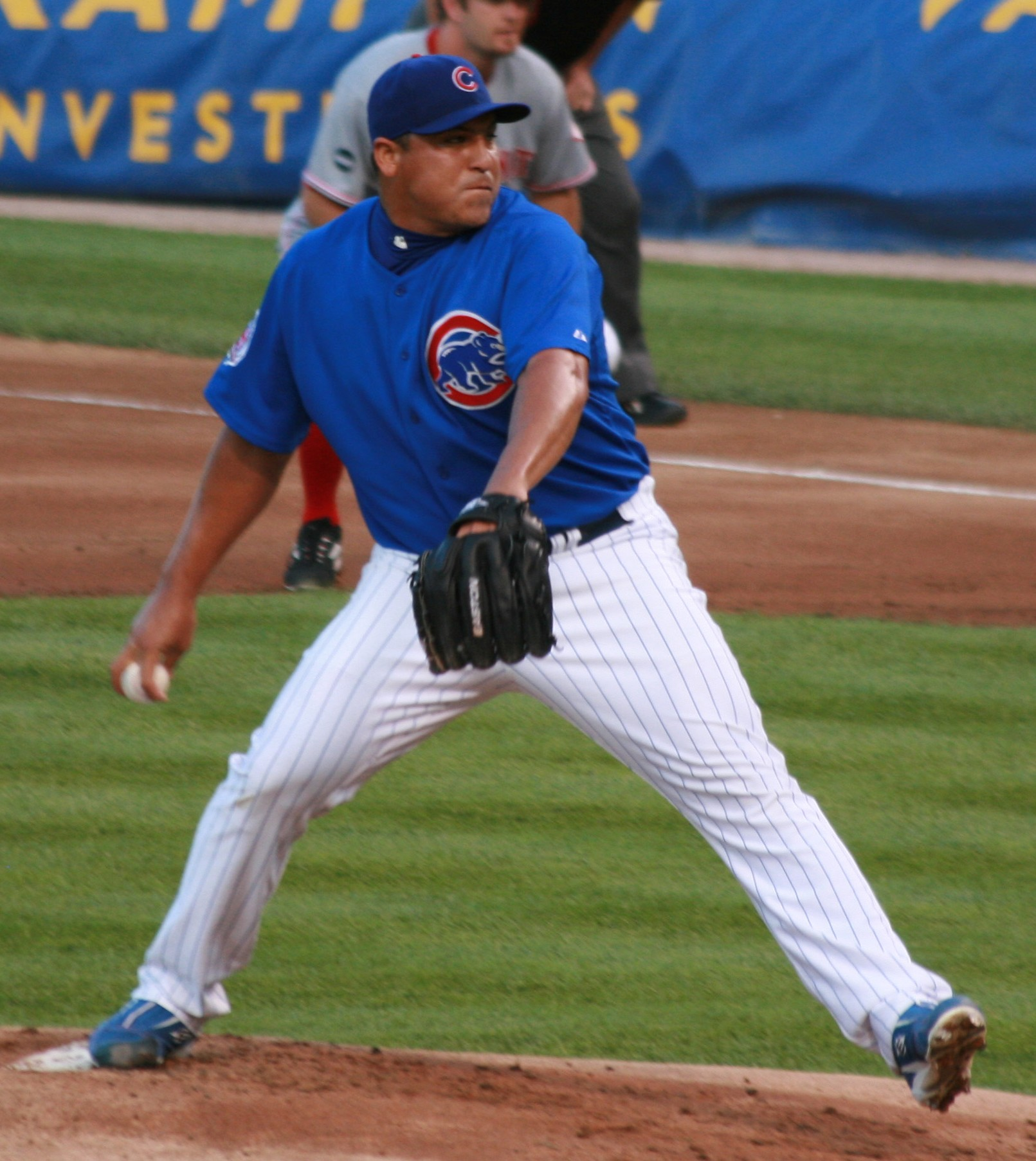
- Zambrano with the Chicago Cubs in 2010
- Pitcher
- Born: June 1, 1981 (age 45); Puerto Cabello, Venezuela
- Batted: Switch Threw: Right

MLB debut
- August 20, 2001, for the Chicago Cubs

Last MLB appearance
- September 21, 2012, for the Miami Marlins

MLB statistics
- Win–loss record: 132–91
- Earned run average: 3.66
- Strikeouts: 1,637
- Stats at Baseball Reference

Teams
- Chicago Cubs (2001–2011); Miami Marlins (2012)

Career highlights and awards
- 3× All-Star (2004, 2006, 2008); 3× Silver Slugger Award (2006, 2008, 2009); NL wins leader (2006); Pitched a no-hitter on September 14, 2008

Carlos Alberto Zambrano Matos (born June 1, 1981), nicknamed "Big Z" or "El Toro", is a Venezuelan former professional baseball pitcher. He played in Major League Baseball (MLB) from 2001 to 2012 for the Chicago Cubs and Miami Marlins. Zambrano, who stands 6 feet 4 inches (1.93 m) and weighs 275 pounds (125 kg), was signed by the Cubs as a free agent in 1997 and made his debut in 2001.

After being used in both starting and relief duties, he enjoyed his first full season as a starter in 2003, finishing with a 13–11 record, 168 strikeouts and a 3.11 ERA.

Zambrano is known as one of the best hitting pitchers of recent times. He was a switch-hitter with a career .238 batting average with 24 home runs, 71 RBIs and a slugging percentage of .396. The 24 home runs are the most ever by a Cubs pitcher. He also tied with Ferguson Jenkins for the club record for home runs by a pitcher in a single season, hitting six in 2006. Zambrano was called on to pinch hit 20 times in his career and won three Silver Slugger Awards for his hitting.

Zambrano was the only National League pitcher to win at least 13 games in each year from 2003 to 2008. In 2006, he became the first player from Venezuela to lead the National League in wins.

== Professional career ==
=== Chicago Cubs (2001–2011) ===
==== 2001–02 seasons ====
Zambrano was called up to the Cubs and pitched in his first game on August 20, 2001, starting against the Milwaukee Brewers at Wrigley Field in the second game of a double header. Zambrano started the game well, retiring nine of the first ten batters faced. He ran into difficulties in the fourth inning, and was removed before getting any outs in the fifth. He was charged with seven earned runs, walked four batters, and threw just 74 pitches.

One month later, on September 20, Zambrano earned his first big-league victory by finishing out the fifth inning against the Houston Astros. Zambrano pitched just two-thirds of an inning in relief of Juan Cruz, and was just 20 years old. He played 6 games making 1 start with a 1–2 record and a 15.26 ERA. Zambrano did not have any additional starts in the season, and the Cubs finished in third place with an 88–74 record.

Zambrano started the 2002 season at the Triple-A Iowa Cubs, but was quickly called up to the big leagues where he was dispatched to the bullpen and pitched in sixteen games during the first three months of the season. On July 1, 2002, Zambrano started against the Florida Marlins, taking a struggling Jason Bere's spot in the rotation. Zambrano logged sixteen starts for the Cubs, recording four wins and eight losses. At times he showed immense potential, including eight innings of shutout ball against the Milwaukee Brewers on September 4. Zambrano did struggle with control, logging 63 walks in just over a hundred innings of work. Overall, he finished the season with a 4–8 record and a 3.66 ERA in 32 games (16 starts). The Cubs posted a disappointing 67–95 record for the season, finishing in fifth place.

==== 2003 season ====
Zambrano maintained his position in the Cubs starting rotation in 2003 and started 32 games with a 3.11 ERA and 13 wins in the fourth spot in the rotation, behind Mark Prior, Kerry Wood, and Matt Clement. The Cubs won the National League Central division, and were one win away from going to the World Series before being defeated by the Florida Marlins. The following year, Zambrano improved his statistics by lowering his ERA to 2.75 and increasing his strikeout total to 188. His record was the best on the Cubs staff that year, compiling a 16–8 record.

On August 22, Zambrano started against Curt Schilling of the Arizona Diamondbacks. While Schilling pitched a strong game and recorded 14 strikeouts, Zambrano took a no-hitter into the eighth inning. Zambrano got the first two batters out before Shea Hillenbrand broke up the no-hitter with an infield single down the third-base line. The play was very close at first, with TV replays indicating that the call may have been blown by first base umpire Bill Miller. Zambrano retired the next three batters (which would have been the final three outs) before giving up two more hits in the game. The previous no-hitter for the Cubs was thrown in 1972 by Milt Pappas.

Zambrano got his first post-season start on October 1 in Atlanta against the Braves in game two of the NLDS. He pitched 5 2/3 innings, giving up eleven hits and three runs. The last hit by Rafael Furcal bounced off of Zambrano's leg, and he was removed from the game as a precaution. The Cubs did come back to tie the game in the eighth inning, with Zambrano getting a no-decision. The Cubs won the series 3–2, with Zambrano seeing no additional action.

Zambrano was the starter in the first game of the NLCS at Wrigley Field on October 7. While the Cubs spotted him a first inning 4–0 lead, he was unable to hold it, giving up five earned runs in six innings, including three home runs in the top of the third inning. The Cubs did come back, with a dramatic two-run home run by Sammy Sosa in the bottom of the ninth to tie the game, but the Marlins won the game in 11 innings 9–8. Zambrano got his third chance for a post-season victory as the starter in the fifth game in Miami. Once again, Zambrano wasn't sharp, giving up four walks, five hits, and two earned runs in just five innings, along with the loss. Josh Beckett for the Marlins had a magnificent outing, throwing a two-hitter sending the series back to Chicago. The Cubs would end up losing the series to the eventual-World Series champ Marlins after a deciding 7 games.

==== 2004 season ====
On May 7, Zambrano produced another fantastic start, permitting only 2 hits against the Colorado Rockies. Zambrano retired the first 14 batters he faced before giving up a single to Matt Holliday. Only 97 pitches were thrown on the afternoon for the victory, with Colorado managing to hit just four of them out of the infield on a breezy, cold day at Wrigley. Zambrano continued his brilliance in his next start against the Dodgers, stringing together an additional eight innings without giving up an earned run.

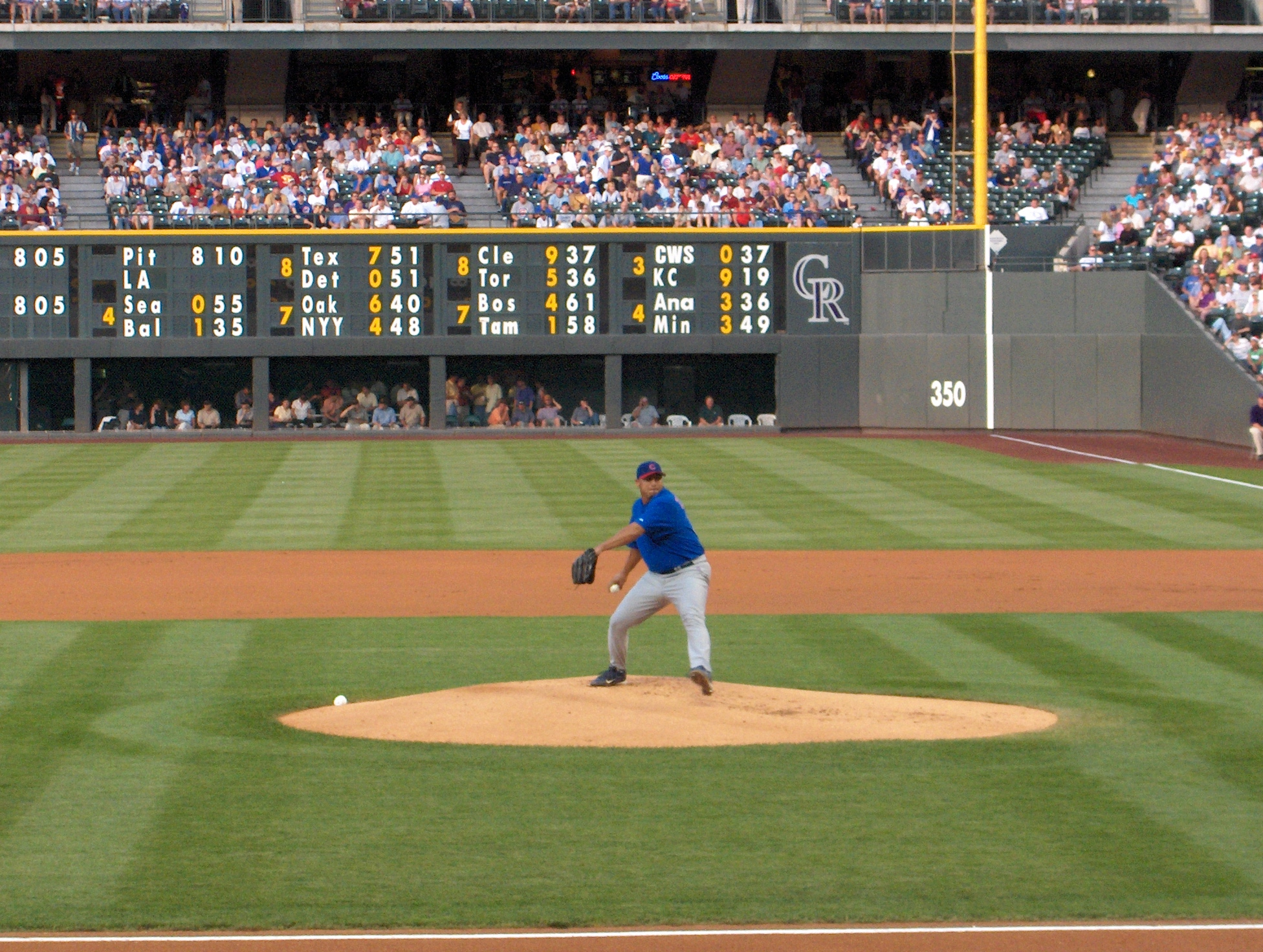
Zambrano at Coors Field in 2004.

Through his first fourteen starts of the season, Zambrano had posted an 8–2 record, with quality starts in twelve of the games. His early season performance also earned him his first trip to the All-Star game where he pitched one inning in relief.

Some of his most memorable starts have been against the rival St. Louis Cardinals. The first was on May 2 when he threw seven shutout innings, and Zambrano registered 12 strikeouts before being lifted in the 8th inning for a pinch hitter. The Cubs eventually lost, 1–0.

The next was on July 19, where he and Jim Edmonds built upon the rivalry between two Midwestern teams. In the first inning, Edmonds was hit by a pitch to load the bases. In the fourth inning, Edmonds connected for a home run, and watched the ball go over the fence from home plate. An agitated Zambrano yelled at Edmonds as he crossed the plate, but the night was far from over. In his next at bat in the sixth inning, Zambrano struck Edmonds out on three pitches, and wagged his finger at Edmonds on his way to the dugout. In the eighth inning with the score tied, Scott Rolen hit a two-out, two-run home run to break a 3–3 tie. Edmonds was the next batter, whom Zambrano immediately hit with a pitch and was ejected from the game. Zambrano indicated that it was not intentional, but Rolen and manager Tony La Russa did not agree.

Zambrano was awarded the NL Pitcher of the Month for September. In his five starts during the month, Zambrano posted a 4–0 record over 35 2/3 innings, giving up only four earned runs. It wasn't enough for the Cubs as they finished with a late season losing streak, and missed the playoffs.

In 2004, Zambrano led his team in ERA (2.75, fourth in the league), won 16 games (tied with teammate Greg Maddux), collected 188 strikeouts, and led the league in hit batsmen (20). He was also selected as an All-Star for the first time in his career.

==== 2005 season ====
With injuries to key starters, and Zambrano's improving game, Zambrano was named the opening day starter for the Cubs. Zambrano was cautious about the opportunity, but was less cautious about arguing balls and strikes with home plate umpire Dale Scott after being pulled in the fifth inning and was eventually ejected. Two starts later, Zambrano gave up one hit but left in the eighth inning after throwing 111 pitches. He had cramps at the beginning of the game that concerned some Cubs fans still wondering about the other starters.

Continuing to build on the rivalry with the Cardinals, Zambrano turned in good performances once again in 2005. The first was on April 20, facing Jeff Suppan in St. Louis. Zambrano gained the victory pitching within one out of a complete game and had his first career triple. He returned to St. Louis again on July 22 to face ace Chris Carpenter. Zambrano turned in another excellent performance, striking out 12 and giving up only three hits over nine complete innings. St. Louis picked up the victory in extra innings on a David Eckstein squeeze play. The Cardinals made the trip to Chicago on August 12, starting Jason Marquis against Zambrano. Once again Zambrano gained the victory, this time pitching six shutout innings before leaving with tightness in his back A final start against the rivals was completed on September 18 as a rematch with Carpenter, with similar results as Zambrano pitched a complete game, giving up two earned runs and gaining the victory, his third of the season against the Cardinals. The final results for the four games: three victories, no defeats, four earned runs, and averaging over eight innings a start.

Zambrano witnessed a strange injury surface early in the season that was first diagnosed as "tennis elbow" but was later traced to his use of the internet to stay in contact with relatives in Venezuela.

On August 7, in just the fourth meeting of pitchers with the same last name since 2000, Víctor Zambrano of the New York Mets bested Carlos Zambrano at Shea Stadium, pitching the New York Mets to a 6–1 win. Both Zambranos entered with 42 career wins, the second time in major league history that opposing starters with the same last name came in with matching victory totals, according to the Elias Sports Bureau. The other was on June 15, 1944, when Red Barrett of the Boston Braves and Dick Barrett of the Philadelphia Phillies each had 19 career wins. The Zambranos had other similarities: both were born in Venezuela, both throw with their right arm, both switch hit, and both wear No. 38. Beside this, it was the fourth time in modern major league history that starting pitchers with a last name beginning with Z faced each other, according to ESPN. Both Zambrano had both faced Barry Zito of the San Francisco Giants.

Zambrano finished the season sixth in the National League in strikeouts (202), tenth in ERA (3.26), and third in winning percentage (70%, with a record of 14–6), seventh in WHIP (1.15), tenth in strikeouts per nine innings (8.14), and ninth in innings pitched (223 1/3). He also hit well for a pitcher, batting .300 with 6 doubles, 2 triples, and 1 home run in 84 plate appearances.

==== 2006 season ====
For the second consecutive season, Zambrano was named the Cubs opening day starter, and with similar results from the previous year. In his first start of 2006, Zambrano was wild, issuing five walks, and five earned runs without getting through the fifth inning. The Cubs did score runs posting 16 in the victory.

After a poor opening game, the Cubs did not give Zambrano much offensive support in his next six starts, providing less than two runs a game. This led to Zambrano going winless until May 10, even though he pitched four quality starts in his first seven. On June 5, Zambrano made another bid for a no-hitter against the Astros in Houston. Zambrano had a perfect game go one out into the eighth inning before Preston Wilson hit a single.

I made one mistake today and I did pay for it. It cost me the no-no.

In addition to an excellent pitching performance, Zambrano hit a three-run home run in the second inning, his first of the season.

Zambrano went to his second All-Star Game during the 2006 season. He was slated to pitch two innings in the game, however, he had to sit out the game after suffering a minor injury when he was accidentally hit by White Sox third base coach Joey Cora's fungo bat during pre-game warmups. Zambrano peaked during the month of July, posting a perfect 6–0 record for the month, the first time a Cubs pitcher had recorded as many victories since 1979 when Rick Reuschel recorded seven in a month. He also was a star at the plate, hitting two home runs during the six games. Included in the month was a two-hit, ten strikeout, eight inning, 123 pitch performance against the Astros. Zambrano finished out the month with a 6–3 victory over the arch-rival Cardinals, where he bested Chris Carpenter. While the Cubs were far out of contention for a playoff spot, Zambrano continued with a positive attitude. Zambrano was rewarded with his second National League Pitcher of the Month award for his July efforts.

Wildness did impact Zambrano's ability to throw complete games based on the number of pitches required to get deep into the game. On August 14, he shut out the Astros through eight innings on just four hits, but he also gave up seven walks, hit a batter, and recorded a wild pitch. He also needed 121 pitches to get through eight innings, and was replaced by closer Ryan Dempster in the ninth to finish the game.

In his 30th start of the season on September 4, Zambrano suffered a setback leaving the game early in the second inning with lower back stiffness, but an MRI indicated no significant disc injuries. Zambrano gave up four hits and four walks before leaving in the shortest start in his career. Zambrano avoided a trip to the disabled list, but was skipped in his next two starts. He pitched again on September 17 against the Reds. Cub fans were relieved to see him pitch seven scoreless innings, and not showing any signs of the injury from his previous outing.

He finished the 2006 season with a 16–7 record, 210 strikeouts, a 3.41 ERA, and an MLB-leading 115 walks. Despite the Cubs finishing with the worst record in the National League, 2006 was a transformative year for Zambrano, as he pitched well under the pressure of assuming the number-one role in the Cubs' rotation as former top pitchers, Mark Prior and Kerry Wood, were injured for most of the season.

==== 2007 season ====
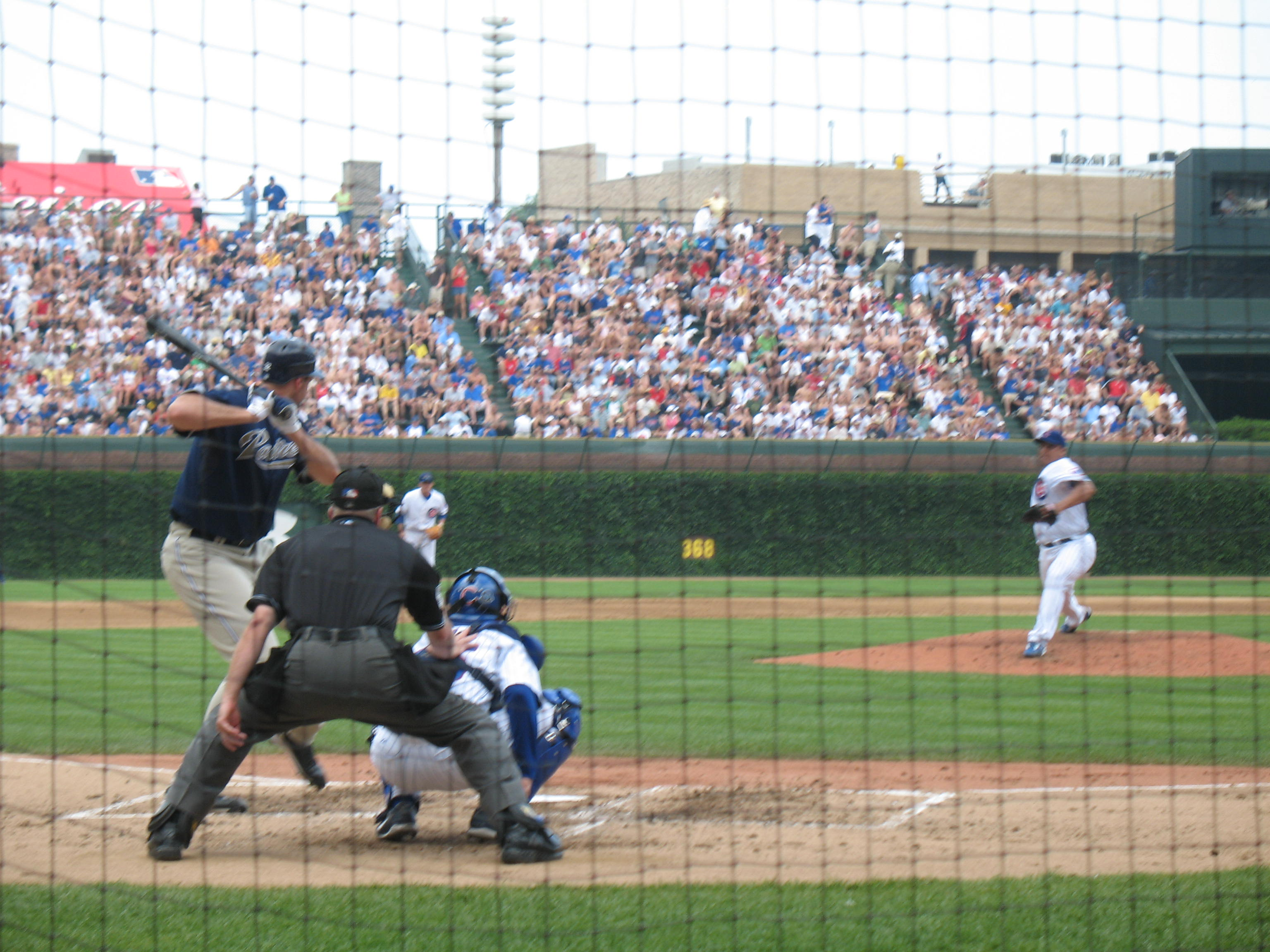
Zambrano delivers to Chris Young before the June 16 brawl and ejection.

Based on his tenure with the MLB, Zambrano was eligible for free agency at the end of the 2007 season. Originally, Zambrano indicated that he needed to have a new contract signed before the start of the season, but it appeared that a deal was almost in place, so his agent extended the deadline to go into the season. The contract was close to being done, but then the sale of the team was announced, and all talks were put on hold. Zambrano ultimately signed a five-year, US$91.5 million contract on August 17, 2007.

After his last start of the 2006 season where the Cubs dropped to 30 games below .500, Zambrano identified the need for quality pitching to be added before the next season. The Cubs management added Ted Lilly and Jason Marquis in the off-season as part of a $300 million spending spree. After the acquisitions, Zambrano made strong predictions for the 2007 season, declaring that he would win the Cy Young Award and the Cubs would win the World Series.

Zambrano and the Cubs' start did not meet his predictions. In his first five starts, only one was a quality start, he had a 6.91 ERA with 19 walks and 7 home runs allowed in just 28 1/3 innings. The team did not fare much better, posting a 10–14 record in April. After a difficult game against Cincinnati where they blew a big early lead, Cubs manager Lou Piniella began to show a little frustration on the inconsistency being shown early in the season by Zambrano and the team.

One cause for his struggles compared to previous years was trouble with the first inning. After giving up three first-inning runs in a loss on May 10, Zambrano described the challenge as being related to bad luck and control.

Zambrano made some changes in his delivery with Cubs pitching coach Larry Rothschild and turned in a stellar performance in New York yielding only one run while providing eight strong innings.

The best I felt as far as command and throwing the ball anywhere. I’ve been working in the bullpen with Larry. Hopefully, this can be the start of a good streak.

In his next start, Zambrano faced the cross-town rival White Sox at Wrigley. Zambrano did not get much support as Alfonso Soriano misplayed a foul ball in the second inning, extending the inning by an out which cost two runs, and Neal Cotts in the bullpen gave up a grand-slam in the seventh inning with two outs which charged back three addition runs. The official statistics looked poor as he was charged with seven earned runs, however it was not as poor of an outing as the box score recorded.

Zambrano continued to improve his performance in his following performance in Los Angeles against the Los Angeles Dodgers. He indicated his control issues were improving, and got ahead of hitters early in the count.

I was feeling good. I was able to throw strikes and that was the key. I threw a lot of first-pitch strikes and that helped me a lot. When you make your pitches and attack the strike zone, you're going to win games.

On June 1, 2007, Michael Barrett and Cubs pitcher Zambrano got into an altercation in the Cubs dugout. The dispute stemmed from a passed ball and errant throw (on the same play) by Barrett in the previous half inning that allowed a run to score and contributed to the unraveling of Zambrano who ended up allowing six earned runs on thirteen hits in five innings. Shortly after the controversy, he went on to win his next two starts. Zambrano came close to pitching a no hitter on June 16. However, he fell short of his goal in the eighth inning, when an infield single broke up the no-hitter. Zambrano would later lose the game 1–0 on a solo home run by the Padres' Russell Branyan.

He finished July with 5–1 record, which was the best in the league. He became the first pitcher to win fourteen games in 2007, and won the "National League Pitcher of the Month" in July. After winning the award, Zambrano began to struggle throughout August. He started the month by earning a no decision on August 3, after leaving the game early due to dehydration. He recorded his one thousandth strike-out during his subsequent start, but proceeded to lose the game. Zambrano went winless in August, despite signing a rich multi-year contract with the Cubs. He started September by failing to win a game against the Los Angeles Dodgers. Zambrano, who only lasted four innings, was booed by Wrigley Field's audience as he left the field. In a post game interview, he responded to the boos by stating, "I thought these were the greatest fans in baseball, but they showed me today that they only care about themselves. That's not fair, when you are struggling, you want to feel like you have their support. I don't accept their reaction." He apologized for his remarks the next day.

Despite failing to win the Cy Young Award as he predicted, Zambrano rebounded from a winless August with a 4–2 record in the final month of the season while lowering his season ERA below 4.00 with consecutive scoreless outings in his final two starts. He finished the regular season with a career-high in both games started and wins, with a record of 18–13 in 34 starts while pitching at least 200 innings for the fifth consecutive season. He also led the NL by issuing 101 walks.

Zambrano started Game 1 of the NLDS against the Arizona Diamondbacks but left after only six innings and 85 pitches because Cubs manager Lou Piniella planned to bring the right-hander back on three days’ rest in Game 4. It was a failed tactic, as the Cubs lost in three games, with Piniella's Game 1 immediately called into question.

==== 2008 season ====
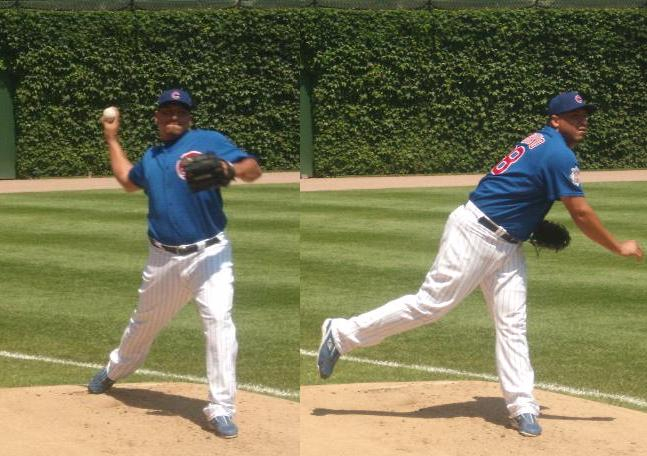
Zambrano warms up in August 2008 at Wrigley Field.

Zambrano started the 2008 season by compiling a 12–4 record with a 2.76 ERA through July 27. At the plate, he had a batting average of .354 through September 14. Zambrano also had a four-hit game against the Pittsburgh Pirates on May 23, making him the first Cubs pitcher since Lew Burdette in 1964 to accomplish this feat. On June 21, the Cubs placed Zambrano on the 15-day disabled list (retroactive to June 19), because of a right shoulder strain. In his return from the DL on July 4, Zambrano pitched six shutout innings and recorded the victory in the Cubs' 2–1 win over the St. Louis Cardinals. On July 7, Zambrano was one of seven Chicago Cubs players announced as participants of the All-Star Game. On July 19 he set the club record for home runs by a pitcher, when he hit a seventh inning homer in Houston off Wandy Rodríguez. On August 26, Zambrano set two records for hitting proficiency by a pitcher. His fourth-inning RBI single gave him a 13-start hitting streak, breaking Johnny Sain's record of 12, and also marked the eighth straight start in which he had an RBI, breaking the record of seven set by Wes Ferrell.Both streaks would end in his next start.

On September 14, in his first start back after missing two starts due to rotator cuff tendinitis, Zambrano no-hit the Houston Astros 5–0. The game was moved to Miller Park in Milwaukee because of damage in Houston due to Hurricane Ike, making it the first neutral site no-hitter. Zambrano only allowed two base-runners, as he walked Michael Bourn in the fourth inning and hit Hunter Pence in the fifth inning. It was the first no-hitter by a Cubs pitcher since Milt Pappas did so September 2, 1972, breaking the longest drought of any team to have already had a no-hitter. Zambrano gave up one walk and threw 10 strikeouts over 110 pitches in his 14th win of the season and his 95th all time.

==== 2009 season ====
On May 27, Zambrano was ejected in the seventh inning of a game against the Pittsburgh Pirates after an argument with umpire Mark Carlson on a call of safe at home plate. With the Cubs up, 2–1, and Nyjer Morgan representing the tying run at third base, Zambrano's pitch got away from Cubs catcher Geovany Soto. While Soto chased after the ball, Zambrano raced Morgan to the plate and tried to apply the tag, but Carlson called Morgan safe, contending that Morgan's left hand got past Zambrano. After a brief argument, Zambrano appeared to bump Carlson and was ejected. Zambrano then threw a ball into left field, hurled his glove into the dugout and repeatedly struck a recently installed Gatorade dispenser in the dugout with a baseball bat, while Cubs manager Lou Piniella tried to calm him down. Zambrano was suspended six games without pay and fined $3,000 by MLB. Zambrano's troubles continued when he missed the team's flight to Atlanta. The issue was resolved internally, within the Cubs organization. During his next start, Zambrano struck-out seven batters, and hit the game-winning home run en route to his 100th career win. After the game, reporters began to inquire if Zambrano could possibly win 300 games during his career. He replied that he tentatively planned to retire when his contract with the Cubs expired, claiming, "I want to help this team and do everything possible to win with this team. After five years, or four years, or whatever it is, that's it. I just don't want to play. I want to stay at home and see my daughters grow up and be with my family more."

==== 2010 season ====
Zambrano's opening day start was his sixth consecutive, a Cubs record; however, he gave up eight runs in 1 1/3 innings, including a three-run home run to Jason Heyward in his first career at-bat. He was charged with the loss as the Cubs lost the game, 16–5. Zambrano bounced back in his next start against the Cincinnati Reds, however. Zambrano pitched seven strong innings, giving up three earned runs, six hits, and striking out nine batters en route to his first victory of the season. On April 21, 2010, The Cubs moved Zambrano to the bullpen. On May 30, 2010, the Cubs decided to move Zambrano back to the rotation. He made his first start on June 4, against the Astros. In his first four starts after returning to the rotation, Zambrano was 2–2 with a 3.09 ERA.

On June 25, 2010, against the Chicago White Sox at U.S. Cellular Field, Zambrano allowed up four runs in the first inning. He then proceeded to mount a furious tirade in the Cubs' dugout. Cameras showed Zambrano appearing to yell at Derrek Lee, whom the pitcher apparently blamed for failing to field a sharply-hit ball off the bat of Juan Pierre, resulting in a lead-off double. The Cubs coaching staff had to separate the two players and manager Lou Piniella opted not to send Zambrano back to the mound in the second inning. Cubs general manager Jim Hendry announced that Zambrano would be suspended indefinitely for his behavior in the game. The next day, Piniella announced that when Zambrano returned, he would be moved back to the bullpen. It was later confirmed that Zambrano would undergo anger management before returning with the team. The Cubs then returned Zambrano to the rotation for the second time where he did not give up more than two runs in any start since his return from the bullpen on August 9. Over that time, he allowed only 11 total runs (9 earned) in 50 innings, and pulled his ERA down to 3.75. On August 30, 2010 against the Pittsburgh Pirates, Zambrano improved to 3–0 since his return to the pitching rotation, striking out seven. Additionally, he recorded his 21st career home run with a two-run shot, increasing his club record for home runs by a pitcher. On September 15 at Busch Stadium, he once again faced Cardinal's ace Chris Carpenter and out-dueled him throwing 104 pitches over six innings giving up just 2 runs (1 earned). He has now won 5 consecutive starts and 6 decisions overall since returning to the rotation. Zambrano pitched for the first time with his mother present against the San Diego Padres at San Diego on Monday, September 27, 2010. He gave up no runs over 7 innings and won the game. His record now sits at 10–6 with a 3.36 ERA. Zambrano was 7–0 in his first 9 starts with an ERA of 1.07 (seven earned runs in 59 innings) since his return to the rotation on Aug. 14. Zambrano finished the season 11–6 with an ERA of 3.33. He was 11–5 with an ERA of 3.19 in 20 starts and pitched 113 innings in those starts. He was 0–1 with a 4.32 ERA in 16 bullpen appearances spanning 16 2/3innings. For the entire season, Zambrano gave up just seven home runs.

==== 2011 season ====
Zambrano lost the role as the Chicago Cubs opening day starter to Ryan Dempster, but did record a quality start in his first outing as the Cubs number 2 starter going 6-plus innings and giving up three runs. He also experienced some cramps in this game, which led to a premature exit even though he had thrown 99 pitches. In his 4th start of the year, Zambrano dueled the San Diego Padres Tim Stauffer and pitched 8 scoreless innings at Wrigley Field. He displayed better than average control, giving up just one walk and striking out 10 with 3 hits. He received a no-decision for his efforts as the Cubs were unable to score while he was on the mound. The Cubs eventually won the game in the 10th inning on Tyler Colvin's game-winning single. Zambrano's 10-game overall win streak came to an end on Sunday, April 24 after a rough first inning against the Dodgers lead to 5 runs. Zambrano finished the game, giving up 6 runs on 8 hits in just 5 innings—his shortest outing of the season. Zambrano faced the Dodgers again on May 4, this time at Dodger Stadium. He pitched well; going 8 innings, allowing one run on 5 hits, and receiving the win. On the heels of a road win against the Arizona Diamondbacks, Zambrano's road winning streak stood at 10. Another win against the Los Angeles Dodgers extended the streak to 11, but Zambrano was tagged for a loss against the Cincinnati Reds on May 16. On August 6, 2011, again against the Reds, Zambrano hit his 23rd career home run, making him tied for ninth on the list of MLB's all-time leading home run-hitting pitchers.

On August 12, 2011, against the Atlanta Braves at Turner Field, Zambrano allowed five home runs. After the fifth home run he allowed, he threw two inside pitches at Chipper Jones. Zambrano was subsequently ejected from the game by home plate umpire Tim Timmons. This would turn out to be Zambrano's final appearance with the Cubs. Following his ejection, Zambrano cleaned out his locker from the visiting team's clubhouse, and told the team's personnel that he was retiring. The next day, on August 13, the Cubs suspended Zambrano for 30 days, preventing him from performing or attending any activity with the club, as well as having his pay suspended for a period of 30 days. Zambrano later apologized to the Cubs and their fans, saying he wanted to "remain a Cub for life" and that his comments about retiring were said out of frustration. He appealed for a shorter suspension through the players' union. On September 2, the club announced that Zambrano would not participate for the remainder of the 2011 season. Cub teammates did not express sympathy for his plight, with veteran pitcher Ryan Dempster remarking, "He's made his bed. Let him sleep in it. It's not like it's something new." As Zambrano spent the rest of the 2011 season on the restricted list, he finished the year 9–7 with a 4.82 ERA in 24 starts.

=== Miami Marlins ===
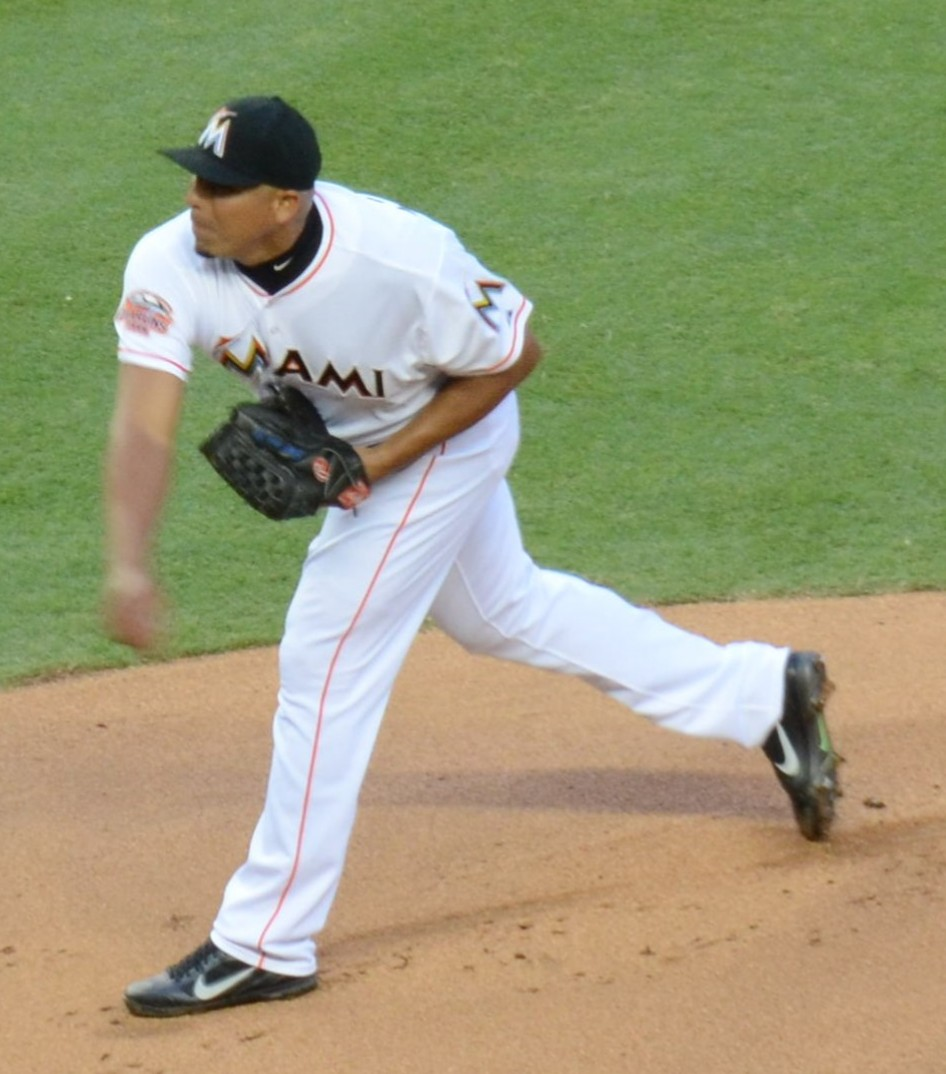
Zambrano pitching for the Miami Marlins in 2012

On January 5, 2012, the Cubs traded Zambrano to the Miami Marlins in return for pitcher Chris Volstad.

His first start as a member of the Marlins was against the Cincinnati Reds. He pitched six innings with six strikeouts, allowed four hits, including a home run in a no decision. In that same game, Zambrano also got his first base hit as a Marlin. After an 0–2 start in his first four starts, Zambrano got his first win as a Marlin against the Houston Astros. He pitched a complete game shutout with nine strikeouts, a walk, and only three hits. Zambrano started the 2012 season 4-3 with a 2.81 ERA in his first 11 starts but later faltered down the stretch. In his last 9 starts, he was 1-6 with a 7.62 ERA, 38 walks, and 27 strikeouts in 41 innings. On July 30, 2012, the Marlins demoted Zambrano to the bullpen. Zambrano became a free agent after finishing the season 7-10 with a 4.49 ERA in 35 games (20 starts and 15 appearances out of the bullpen).

=== Philadelphia Phillies ===
On May 15, 2013, Zambrano signed a one-year minor league contract with the Philadelphia Phillies. Despite a highly successful AAA stint, he was released on July 25 after going 4–2, with a 3.51 ERA.

On September 5, 2014, he officially announced his retirement from baseball.

=== Leones de Yucatán (2018) ===
On July 5, 2018, Zambrano came out of retirement to pitch for the Leones de Yucatán of the Mexican League. He made 7 starts, going 2–1 with a 5.18 ERA, before he was released on August 14, 2018.

=== Chicago Dogs ===
On April 16, 2019, Zambrano signed with the Chicago Dogs of the American Association of Independent Professional Baseball.

In 35 games (5 starts) 61 innings he struggled going 4-1 with a 5.16 ERA with 51 strikeouts. Zambrano again announced his retirement on January 17, 2020.

== Pitching style ==
Zambrano had six pitches. His most-used pitch was a heavy sinker at 88–92 mph designed to get ground balls. His next-most used pitch was a cutter (88–91), followed by a splitter (80–85). He also threw a four-seam fastball (90–91), slider (79–82), and curveball (high 60s–low 70s). The only major variation in his approach to right-handers and left-handers was that he threw the splitter much more to lefties. That pitch was a favorite with two strikes against lefties, while he threw the cutter most often in those counts against righties.

The combative Zambrano was known for being highly emotive on the mound, often antagonizing opponents and teammates alike. He incurred lengthy team suspensions in June 2010 and August 2011 after unleashing tirades in the wake of bad pitching performances. In another incident, he was suspended six games and fined $3,000 by Major League Baseball for arguing with umpire Mark Carlson and firing a ball into the outfield. In other instances, he quarreled—and physically fought—with teammates for what Zambrano considered their poor effort or performance.

== See also ==
- List of Major League Baseball players from Venezuela
- List of Major League Baseball annual wins leaders
- List of Major League Baseball all-time leaders in home runs by pitchers

Sporting positions
Preceded by Kerry Wood	Chicago Cubs Opening Day starting pitcher 2005–2010	Succeeded by Ryan Dempster
Awards and achievements
Preceded by Jake Peavy; Chris Young; Ben Sheets	National League Pitcher of the Month; September 2004; June 2006; July 2007	Succeeded by Dontrelle Willis; Derek Lowe; Jake Peavy
Preceded by Jon Lester	No-hitter pitcher September 14, 2008	Succeeded by Jonathan Sánchez
