= Jason Kendall =

American baseball player (born 1974)

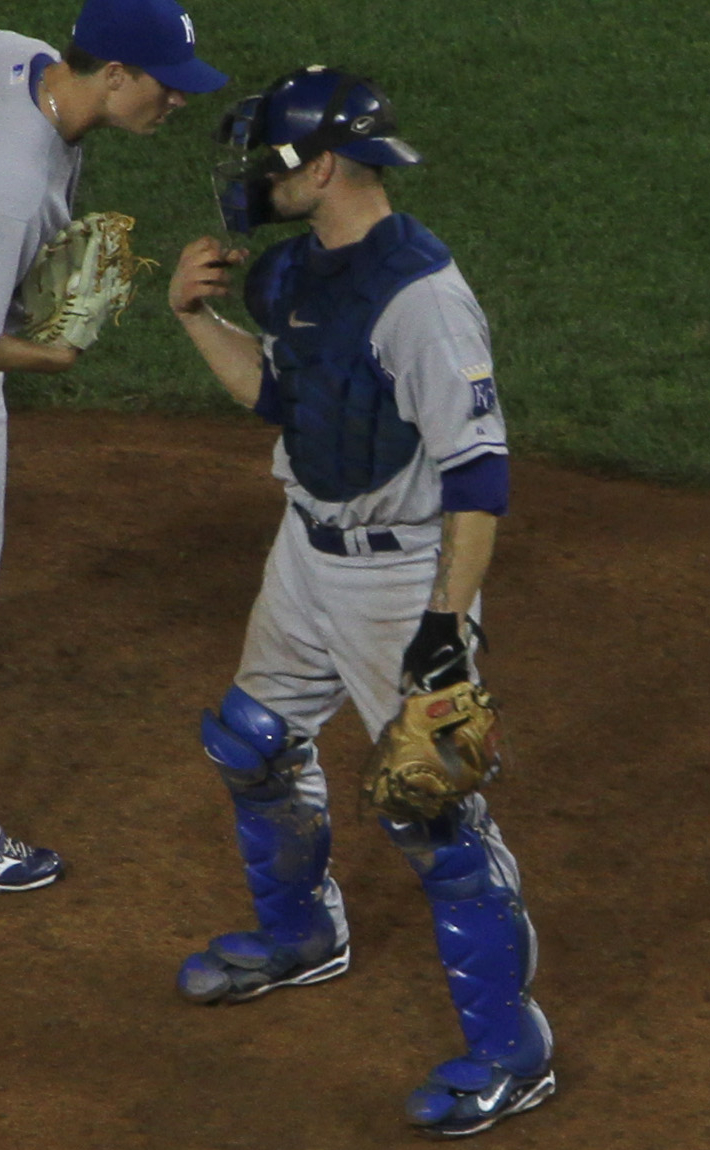
- Kendall with the Kansas City Royals
- Catcher
- Born: June 26, 1974 (age 52); San Diego, California, U.S.
- Batted: Right Threw: Right

MLB debut
- April 1, 1996, for the Pittsburgh Pirates

Last MLB appearance
- August 30, 2010, for the Kansas City Royals

MLB statistics
- Batting average: .288
- Hits: 2,195
- Home runs: 75
- Runs batted in: 744
- Stats at Baseball Reference

Teams
- Pittsburgh Pirates (1996–2004); Oakland Athletics (2005–2007); Chicago Cubs (2007); Milwaukee Brewers (2008–2009); Kansas City Royals (2010)

Career highlights and awards
- 3× All-Star (1996, 1998, 2000)

Jason Daniel Kendall (born June 26, 1974) is an American former professional baseball catcher who played 15 seasons in Major League Baseball (MLB), primarily for the Pittsburgh Pirates. He also played for the Oakland Athletics, Chicago Cubs, Milwaukee Brewers and Kansas City Royals. He is the son of former catcher Fred Kendall, who played in the majors from 1969 to 1980.

In a fifteen-year major league career, Kendall played in 2,085 games, accumulating 2,195 hits in 7,627 at bats for a .288 career batting average along with 75 home runs, 744 runs batted in and a .366 on-base percentage. He finished his career with a .990 fielding percentage. Kendall holds the major league record for most career stolen bases by a catcher since the dead-ball era with 189. At the time of his retirement in 2012, Kendall ranked second among major league catchers in career hits and doubles behind only Iván Rodríguez.

== High school ==
Kendall attended Torrance High School in California, where he tied a national high school record by hitting safely in 43 straight games. He was drafted out of high school in the first round of the 1992 Major League Baseball draft (23rd overall pick) by the Pittsburgh Pirates.

== Professional career ==
=== Pittsburgh Pirates (1996–2004) ===
Kendall made his major league debut in 1996. In his rookie year, he hit .300, made the National League All-Star Team, and was named NL rookie of the year by The Sporting News (he finished third in voting for the MLB Rookie of the Year award). He was also an All-Star in 1998 and 2000. In 1999, he suffered a season-ending injury when he dislocated his ankle while running to first base in a July 4 game against Milwaukee after attempting to beat out a bunt.

On May 19, 2000, Kendall became the first player in Pirates history to hit for the cycle at Three Rivers Stadium, driving in five of Pittsburgh's thirteen runs against the St. Louis Cardinals. On November 18, 2000, Kendall signed a six-year contract extension worth $60 million (equivalent to $112.2 million in 2025). It was the most expensive contract in Pirates history and made him the second-highest-paid catcher at the time, behind only Mike Piazza.

In 2002 and 2005, he led the majors in at-bats per strikeout (18.1 in 2002, 15.4 in 2005). He also led the major leagues in 2005 in times reached base on an error (15). From 2002 through 2004, Kendall led all major league catchers in games and innings behind the plate. He is the Pirates' all-time leader in games caught.

=== Oakland Athletics and Chicago Cubs (2005–2007) ===
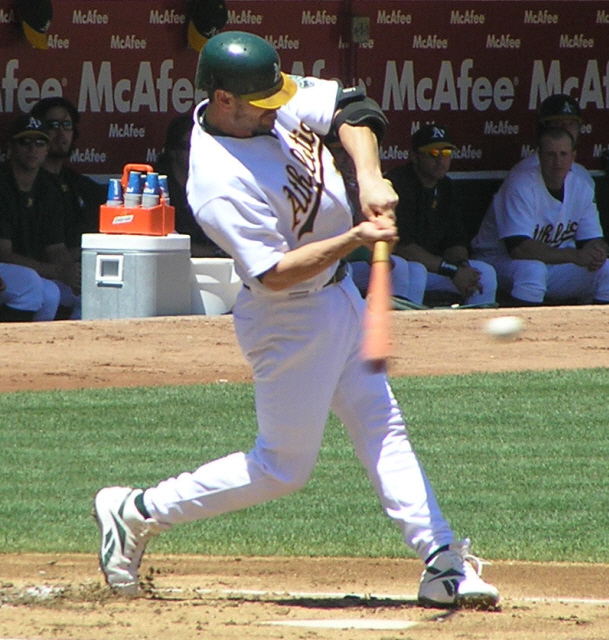
Kendall batting for the A's

After the 2004 season, the Pirates traded Kendall and cash to the Oakland Athletics for Mark Redman, Arthur Rhodes and cash. During the 2005 season, Kendall struggled at the plate. His .321 slugging percentage was the worst (by 20 points) among all major league players who qualified for the batting title. His .271 batting average was the second-lowest of his career. In the field, he allowed 101 stolen bases, more than any other catcher in major league baseball. However, he did bat leadoff for Oakland, something that is very rare to see out of a baseball catcher.

During a game against the Angels on May 2, 2006, Kendall was involved in a bench-clearing incident. John Lackey threw a pitch that started high and inside to Kendall, and then broke back towards the plate. Kendall stepped out of the batter's box and began yelling at Lackey, who told him to stop leaning over the plate with his elbow guard sticking out, trying to be hit by a pitch (as Kendall was known to do throughout his career). Kendall then charged the mound and wrestled with the 6 ft 4 in (1.93 m) Lackey. The two spun around as catcher Jeff Mathis fell behind Kendall who was then punched in the ribs by Lackey, and the two tumbled to the ground. The 2006 season marked Kendall's first post-season appearance, as the Athletics clinched the 2006 American League Western Division championship on September 26. He recorded his first playoff hit in the second game of the American League Division Series off Minnesota's Boof Bonser.

On July 16, 2007, he was traded to the Chicago Cubs for fellow catcher Rob Bowen and minor league pitcher Jerry Blevins. At the time of the trade, Kendall had the lowest on-base percentage (.261) and second lowest slugging percentage (.281) of any starter in major league baseball for 2007. In the field he allowed 111 stolen bases (131 attempts, 20 caught), more than any other catcher in major league baseball.

=== Milwaukee Brewers (2008–2009) ===
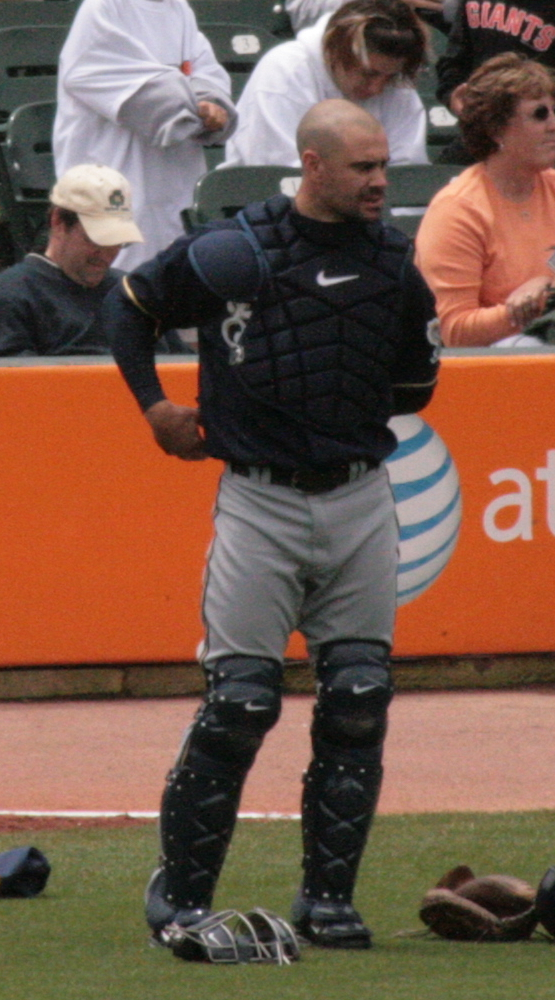
Kendall with the Brewers in 2008

On November 21, 2007, Kendall agreed to a one-year deal with the Milwaukee Brewers. Kendall threw out roughly 40% of base stealers in 2008. Upon making his 110th start of the 2008 season, Kendall fulfilled the option in his contract, securing himself a spot in the Brewers lineup in 2009.

On May 18, 2009, Kendall recorded his 2,000th career hit, becoming the eighth full-time catcher to reach that milestone. In 2009, he had the lowest slugging percentage of any starter in the major leagues, at .305. During his two years with the Brewers his AVG, OBP, and SLG were .244, .329, and .315.

=== Kansas City Royals (2010–2012) ===
On December 11, 2009, Kendall signed a two-year contract with the Kansas City Royals.

Kendall underwent season-ending surgery on September 3, 2010, on his right shoulder after an MRI exam revealed extensive tearing in his rotator cuff. He missed the entire 2011 season because of this injury. He became a free agent after the 2011 season.

Kendall signed with Kansas City on July 19, 2012, to a minor league contract. He played in two games for the AA Northwest Arkansas Naturals before announcing his retirement on July 24.

== Post-playing career ==
Following his retirement, Kendall spent seven years as a special assignment coach in the Royals' organization, during which time he earned a World Series ring. On May 14, 2022, he was hired by the Pittsburgh Pirates to serve in a player development role.

== Playing style ==
Kendall was known as a fundamentally sound catcher who was very good at blocking pitches and handling pitching staffs, despite a relatively weak throwing arm. At the plate, Kendall was known for his very open batting stance and was a contact hitter who tended to "crowd" the plate. He was known to not use batting gloves. He was known as fiercely competitive, and was involved in several bench-clearing brawls. Kendall was also hit by pitches frequently as a result of his batting stance; he was hit 254 times, which is fifth all-time.

Besides being a target for being hit by pitches, Kendall was a stolen-base threat. His 189 career stolen bases are second to Roger Bresnahan in all of modern era MLB history for stolen bases by a player primarily playing catcher. Kendall's plate discipline and rare speed at the catcher position also enabled him to be used as a leadoff hitter. Kendall started the game batting leadoff in 438 of his 2,085 games played, including 119 of his 147 games in 2004 and 90 of his 143 games in 2006 (leadoff is defined as starting the game as the first player to bat for his team and having at least two at-bats in the game).

== Personal life ==
Kendall moved to Kansas City in 2010 where he met his wife, Tricia Kendall, where they are raising their respective children Ethan, Kuyper, Cole, and Karoline.

Kendall has written a book with Lee Judge, Throwback: A Big-League Catcher Tells How the Game Is Really Played, released in May 2014 by St. Martin's Press.

== See also ==
- List of Major League Baseball career hits leaders
- List of Major League Baseball career putouts as a catcher leaders
- List of Major League Baseball career putouts leaders
- List of Major League Baseball career runs scored leaders
- List of Major League Baseball career stolen bases leaders
- List of Major League Baseball players to hit for the cycle
- List of second-generation Major League Baseball players

Awards and achievements
Preceded by Chipper Jones	Sporting News NL Rookie of the Year; 1996	Succeeded by Scott Rolen
Preceded by José Valentín	Hitting for the cycle May 19, 2000	Succeeded by Mike Lansing
