= 2012 Chicago Cubs season =

2012 Chicago Cubs
- League: National League
- Division: Central
- Ballpark: Wrigley Field
- City: Chicago, Illinois
- Record: 61–101 (.377)
- Divisional place: 5th
- Owners: Tom Ricketts
- President of baseball operations: Theo Epstein
- General managers: Jed Hoyer
- Managers: Dale Sveum
- Television: WGN-TV; WGN America; CSN Chicago; CSN Chicago Plus; WCIU-TV (Len Kasper, Bob Brenly)
- Radio: WGN (AM); Chicago Cubs Radio Network (Pat Hughes, Keith Moreland, Judd Sirott)

The 2012 Chicago Cubs season was the 141st season of the Chicago Cubs franchise, the 137th in the National League and the 97th at Wrigley Field. The Cubs finished fifth in the National League Central with a record of 61–101, their worst record since 1966. The Cubs began the season at home on April 5, 2012 against the Washington Nationals and finished the season at home on October 3 against the Houston Astros.

The season marked the first season with Jed Hoyer as General Manager and Theo Epstein as President of Baseball Operations. It also marked the first season with Dale Sveum as manager. The season also marked the last season with the Houston Astros in the National League Central as they would move to the American League West in 2013.

The season also marked the first season in the Cubs rebuilding project under Theo Epstein that would break their 108-year World Series drought and lead the Cubs to the 2016 World Series championship.

The season was the last full season with the Cubs for Alfonso Soriano, who would be traded at the 2013 trade deadline.

During the offseason, the Cubs would acquire future All-Star Anthony Rizzo from the San Diego Padres. During the season, the Cubs would also acquire players that would play important roles during their 2016 World Series season: Travis Wood was acquired via trade from the Cincinnati Reds on December 23, 2011, Albert Almora was drafted on June 4, Jorge Soler was signed as an amateur free agent on June 30, and Kyle Hendricks was acquired via a trade with the Texas Rangers on July 30.

== Offseason transactions ==
=== November 2011 ===
- November 2, Justin Berg, Robert Coello, Angel Guzman, Scott Moore, Chris Robinson, and Jeff Stevens granted free agency.
- November 15, signed Justin Berg as a free agent.
- November 18, Luis Montanez granted free agency.
- November 30, signed David DeJesus as a free agent.

=== December ===
- December 8, drafted Lendy Castillo from the Philadelphia Phillies in the 2011 rule 5 draft. Ryan Flaherty drafted by the Baltimore Orioles in the 2011 rule 5 draft. Marwin Gonzalez drafted by the Boston Red Sox in the 2011 rule 5 draft.
- December 8, traded Tyler Colvin and DJ LeMahieu to the Colorado Rockies. Received Casey Weathers (minors) and Ian Stewart.
- December 9, selected Jeff Bianchi off waivers from the Kansas City Royals.
- December 12, Koyie Hill granted free agency.
- December 21, signed Reed Johnson as a free agent.
- December 22, signed Manny Corpas as a free agent.
- December 23, traded Sean Marshall to the Cincinnati Reds. Received Dave Sappelt, Ronald Torreyes, and Travis Wood.
- December 26, signed Andy Sonnanstine as a free agent.

=== January 2012 ===
- January 4, signed Andy Sonnanstine as a free agent.
- January 5, traded Carlos Zambrano and cash to the Miami Marlins. Received Chris Volstad.
- January 6, signed Edgar Gonzalez as a free agent. Traded Kyung-Min Na (minors) and Andrew Cashner to the San Diego Padres. Received Zach Cates (minors) and Anthony Rizzo.
- January 10, signed Paul Maholm as a free agent.
- January 11, Jeff Bianchi selected by the Milwaukee Brewers off waivers.
- January 13, signed Alfredo Amezaga and Kerry Wood as a free agents.
- January 18, signed Jason Jaramillo as a free agent.
- January 19, signed Rodrigo Lopez as a free agent.
- January 20, signed Bobby Scales as a free agent.
- January 30, signed Trever Miller and Matt Tolbert as a free agents.

=== February ===
- February 2, signed Ryan Rowland-Smith as a free agent.
- February 6, selected Adrian Cardenas off waivers from the Oakland Athletics.
- February 18, signed Nate Robertson as a free agent.
- February 21, traded a player to be named later and Chris Carpenter to the Boston Red Sox. Received a player to be named later. Sent Aaron Kurcz (minors) (March 15, 2012) to the Boston Red Sox to complete the trade. Received Jair Bogaerts (minors) (March 29, 2012) to complete the trade.

=== March ===
- March 11, signed Gerardo Concepcion as an amateur free agent
- March 16, selected Frankie De La Cruz off waivers from the Milwaukee Brewers.
- March 24, Andy Sonnanstine granted free agency.
- March 26, signed Shawn Camp as a free agent. Released Trever Miller.
- March 27, released Jason Jaramillo.
- March 31, released Bobby Scales.

=== April ===
- April 4, selected Luis Valbuena off waivers from the Toronto Blue Jays.

== Regular season ==
=== NL Central standings ===
NL Central
Team	W	L	Pct.	GB	Home	Road
Cincinnati Reds	97	65	.599	—	50‍–‍31	47‍–‍34
St. Louis Cardinals	88	74	.543	9	50‍–‍31	38‍–‍43
Milwaukee Brewers	83	79	.512	14	49‍–‍32	34‍–‍47
Pittsburgh Pirates	79	83	.488	18	45‍–‍36	34‍–‍47
Chicago Cubs	61	101	.377	36	38‍–‍43	23‍–‍58
Houston Astros	55	107	.340	42	35‍–‍46	20‍–‍61

=== NL Wild Card ===
Division leaders
Team	W	L	Pct.
Washington Nationals	98	64	.605
Cincinnati Reds	97	65	.599
San Francisco Giants	94	68	.580

Wild Card teams (Top 2 teams qualify for postseason)
Team	W	L	Pct.	GB
Atlanta Braves	94	68	.580	+6
St. Louis Cardinals	88	74	.543	—
Los Angeles Dodgers	86	76	.531	2
Milwaukee Brewers	83	79	.512	5
Philadelphia Phillies	81	81	.500	7
Arizona Diamondbacks	81	81	.500	7
Pittsburgh Pirates	79	83	.488	9
San Diego Padres	76	86	.469	12
New York Mets	74	88	.457	14
Miami Marlins	69	93	.426	19
Colorado Rockies	64	98	.395	24
Chicago Cubs	61	101	.377	27
Houston Astros	55	107	.340	33

=== Record vs. opponents ===
2012 National League record Source: MLB Standings Grid – 2012
Team	AZ	ATL	CHC	CIN	COL	MIA	HOU	LAD	MIL	NYM	PHI	PIT	SD	SF	STL	WSH	AL
Arizona	–	2–5	5–4	2–5	9–7	5–3	6–0	12–6	3–3	3–4	2–4	3–4	7–11	9–9	1–5	2–4	9–6
Atlanta	5–2	–	3–4	1–5	6–1	14–4	4–2	3–3	3–3	12–6	12–6	3–4	4–3	3–4	5–1	8–10	8–10
Chicago	4–5	4–3	–	4–12	2–4	8–5	2–4	2–4	4–13	4–2	2–4	8–8	3–3	1–6	7–10	1–6	5–10
Cincinnati	5–2	5–1	12–4	–	5–1	10–5	2–4	3–3	9–6	6–2	3–4	11–7	6–2	4–3	6–7	2–5	7–8
Colorado	7–9	1–6	4–2	1–5	–	5–2	5–2	8–10	5–1	5–2	2–7	2–4	8–10	4–14	2–5	4–3	2–13
Houston	0–6	2–4	5–8	5–10	2–5	–	2–4	2–4	8–9	4–2	3–3	5–12	3–5	1–8	4–11	1–7	6–9
Los Angeles	6–12	3–3	4–2	4–2	10–8	4–2	–	4–2	1–6	4–3	5–2	6–1	11–7	8-10	6–5	4–2	6–9
Miami	3–5	4–14	4–2	3–3	4–3	–	4-2	2-4	4–4	4–12	8–10	1–4	5–1	5–2	2–5	9–9	5–13
Milwaukee	3–3	3–3	13–4	6–9	1–5	9–8	6–1	4–4	–	3–2	2–5	11–4	3–4	2–4	6–9	3–5	6–9
New York	4–3	6–12	2–4	2–6	2–5	2–4	3–4	12–4	2–3	–	10–8	5–2	4–3	4–4	4–3	4–14	8–7
Philadelphia	4–2	6–12	4–2	4–3	7–2	10–8	3–3	2–5	5–2	8–10	–	3–4	4–3	2–4	5–2	9-9	5–10
Pittsburgh	4–3	2–3	8–8	7–11	4–2	4–1	12–5	1–6	4–11	2–5	4–3	–	1–5	3–3	8–7	3–2	10–8
San Diego	11–7	3–4	3–3	2–6	10–8	5–3	7–11	1–5	4–3	3–4	3–4	5–1	–	6–12	3–3	2–3	8–7
San Francisco	9–9	4–3	6–1	3–4	14–4	2–5	8–1	10–8	4–2	4–4	4–2	3–3	12–6	–	3–3	1–5	7–8
St. Louis	5–1	1–5	10–7	7–6	5–2	11–4	5–6	5–2	9–6	3–4	3–4	7–8	3–3	3–3	–	3–4	8–7
Washington	4–2	10–8	6–1	5–2	3–4	7–1	2–4	9–9	5–3	14–4	9-9	2–3	3–2	5-1	4-3	–	10–8

=== Transactions ===
==== April ====
- April 5, John Gaub selected by the Tampa Bay Rays off waivers.
- April 21, traded Marlon Byrd and cash to the Boston Red Sox. Received a player to be named later and Michael Bowden. The Boston Red Sox sent Hunter Cervenka (May 15, 2012) to complete the trade.
- April 29, released Edgar Gonzalez.

==== May ====
- May 12, signed Brian Esposito as a free agent.
- May 15, signed Mike MacDougal as a free agent.
- May 19, Kerry Wood voluntarily retired. Purchased Koyie Hill from the Cincinnati Reds.
- May 25, signed Diory Hernandez as a free agent.
- May 29, signed Shane Lindsay as a free agent. Released Nate Robertson.

==== June ====
- June 1, selected Jairo Asencio off waivers from the Cleveland Indians.
- June 4, signed Hung-Chih Kuo as a free agent. Drafted Albert Almora in the 1st round (6th pick) of the 2012 amateur draft. Player signed July 10, 2012.
- June 17, Koyie Hill granted free agency.
- June 27, released Shane Lindsay.
- June 30, signed Jorge Soler as an amateur free agent.

==== July ====
- July 6, released Hung-Chih Kuo.
- July 12, purchased Justin Germano from the Boston Red Sox.
- July 27, signed Jeff Frazier as a free agent.
- July 30, traded Reed Johnson, Paul Maholm and cash to the Atlanta Braves. Received Jaye Chapman and Arodys Vizcaino.
- July 31, traded Geovany Soto to the Texas Rangers. Received Jake Brigham and player to be named or cash. Traded Ryan Dempster to the Texas Rangers. Received Christian Villanueva (minors) and Kyle Hendricks.

==== August ====
- August 5, traded Jeff Baker to the Detroit Tigers. Received players to be named later. The Detroit Tigers sent Marcelo Carreno (minors) (October 16, 2012) and cash (October 16, 2012) to complete the trade.
- August 13, signed Seth McClung as a free agent.
- August 14, released Frankie De La Cruz.
- August 16, signed Horacio Ramirez as a free agent.
- August 19, selected Alex Hinshaw off waivers from the San Diego Padres.
- August 23, selected Miguel Socolovich off waivers from the Baltimore Orioles.
- August 27, traded Blake Lalli to the Oakland Athletics. Received Anthony Recker.
- August 29, Scott Maine selected by the Cleveland Indians off waivers.

==== September ====
- September 7, selected Jason Berken off waivers from the Baltimore Orioles.

==== October ====
- October 4, Blake DeWitt, Alex Hinshaw, and Randy Wells granted free agency.
- October 25, Anthony Recker selected by the New York Mets off waivers.
- October 26, Manny Corpas granted free agency. Chris Volstad selected by the Kansas City Royals off waivers.
- October 27, signed Edwin Maysonet as a free agent.
- October 29, Alfredo Amezaga, Shawn Camp, and Justin Germano granted free agency.
- October 31, Joe Mather granted free agency.

Source.

=== Game log ===
2012 Regular season game log: 61–101 (Home: 38–43; Away: 23–58)
April: 8–15 (Home: 5–8; Away: 3–7)

#	Date	Opponent	Score	Win	Loss	Save	Attendance	Record	Streak
1	April 5	Nationals	1–2	Clippard (1–0)	**Mármol** (0–1)	Lidge (1)	41,176	0–1	L1
2	April 7	Nationals	4–7	Mattheus (1–0)	**Wood** (0–1)	Rodriguez (1)	40,102	0–2	L2
3	April 8	Nationals	4–3	**Samardzija** (1–0)	Zimmermann (0–1)	**Mármol** (1)	31,973	1–2	W1
4	April 9	Brewers	5–7	Marcum (1–0)	**Camp** (0–1)	Axford (1)	38,136	1–3	L1
5	April 10	Brewers	4–7	Narveson (1–0)	**Maholm** (0–1)	Rodríguez (1)	37,265	1–4	L2
6	April 11	Brewers	1–2	Gallardo (1–1)	**Dempster** (0–1)	Axford (2)	34,044	1–5	L3
7	April 12	Brewers	8–0	**Garza** (1–0)	Greinke (1–1)	—	36,311	2–5	W1
8	April 13	@ Cardinals	9–5	**Samardzija** (2–0)	Wainwright (0–2)	—	46,882	3–5	W2
9	April 14	@ Cardinals	1–5	Lynn (2–0)	**Volstad** (0–1)	—	46,792	3–6	L1
10	April 15	@ Cardinals	3–10	Westbrook (2–0)	**Maholm** (0–2)	—	44,952	3–7	L2
11	April 17	@ Marlins	2–5	Cishek (1–0)	**Dolis** (0–1)	Bell (1)	24,544	3–8	L3
12	April 18	@ Marlins	1–9	Buehrle (1–2)	**Garza** (1–1)		25,723	3–9	L4
13	April 19	@ Marlins	3–5	Nolasco (2–0)	**Samardzija** (2–1)	Bell (2)	23,168	3–10	L5
14	April 20	Reds	4–9	Bailey (1–2)	**Volstad** (0–2)	—	37,782	3–11	L6
15	April 21	Reds	6–1	**Maholm** (1–2)	Leake (0–2)	—	38,405	4–11	W1
16	April 22	Reds	3–4	Cueto (2–0)	**López** (0–1)	Marshall (3)	35,801	4–12	L1
17	April 23	Cardinals	3–2	**Dolis** (1–1)	Motte (1–1)	—	37,794	5–12	W1
18	April 24	Cardinals	3–2 (10)	**Russell** (1–0)	Salas (0–1)	—	38,894	6–12	W2
19	April 25	Cardinals	1–5	Lynn (4–0)	**Volstad** (0–3)	—	34,894	6–13	L1
20	April 27	@ Phillies	5–1	**Maholm** (2–2)	Halladay (3–2)	**Dolis** (1)	45,261	7–13	W1
21	April 28	@ Phillies	2–5	Blanton (2–3)	**Wells** (0–1)	Papelbon (7)	45,196	7–14	L1
22	April 29	@ Phillies	5–1	**Garza** (2–1)	Kendrick (0–2)	—	45,550	8–14	W1
23	April 30	@ Phillies	4–6	Qualls (1–0)	**Maine** (0–1)	Papelbon (8)	45,397	8–15	L1

May: 10–17 (Home: 7–7; Away: 3–10)

#	Date	Opponent	Score	Win	Loss	Save	Attendance	Record	Streak
--	May 1	@ Reds	Postponed (rain). Makeup Date August 18.						
24	May 2	@ Reds	3–1	**Samardzija** (3–1)	Arroyo (1–1)	**Mármol** (2)	18,868	9–15	W1
25	May 3	@ Reds	3–4 (10)	Ondrusek (2–0)	**Dolis** (1–2)	—	23,288	9–16	L1
26	May 4	Dodgers	5–4	**Maholm** (3–2)	Billingsley (2–2)	**Dolis** (2)	37,332	10–16	W1
27	May 5	Dodgers	1–5	Capuano (4–0)	**Volstad** (0–4)	—	39,874	10–17	L1
28	May 6	Dodgers	4–3 (11)	**Dolis** (2–2)	Wright (1–2)	—	38,125	11–17	W1
29	May 7	Braves	5–1	**Samardzija** (4–1)	Hanson (3–3)	—	36,307	12–17	W2
30	May 8	Braves	1–3	Medlen (1–0)	**Wood** (0–2)	Kimbrel (10)	38,523	12–18	L1
31	May 9	Braves	1–0	**Maholm** (4–2)	Hudson (1–1)	**Dolis** (3)	31,904	13–18	W1
32	May 11	@ Brewers	7–8 (13)	Chulk (1–0)	**Castillo** (0–1)	—	40,097	13–19	L1
33	May 12	@ Brewers	2–8	Marcum (2–1)	**Volstad** (0–5)	—	42,339	13–20	L2
34	May 13	@ Brewers	8–2	**Camp** (1–1)	Loe (2–1)	—	42,167	14–20	W1
35	May 14	@ Cardinals	6–4	**Camp** (2–1)	Boggs (0–1)	**Dolis** (4)	44,276	15–20	W2
36	May 15	@ Cardinals	6–7	Motte (2–1)	**Dolis** (2–3)	—	45,538	15–21	L1
37	May 16	Phillies	2–9	Contreras (1–0)	**Camp** (2–2)	—	38,678	15–22	L2
38	May 17	Phillies	7–8	Halladay (4–3)	**Volstad** (0–6)	Papelbon (11)	37,986	15–23	L3
39	May 18	White Sox	2–3	Thornton (2–3)	**Samardzija** (4–2)	Reed (4)	34,937	15–24	L4
40	May 19	White Sox	4–7	Danks (3–4)	**Dempster** (0–2)	—	40,228	15–25	L5
41	May 20	White Sox	0–6	Peavy (5–1)	**Maholm** (4–3)	—	38,374	15–26	L6
42	May 21	@ Astros	4–8	Norris (5–1)	**Garza** (2–2)	—	16,895	15–27	L7
43	May 22	@ Astros	1–2	Happ (4–3)	**Wood** (0–1)	Myers (11)	20,091	15–28	L8
44	May 23	@ Astros	1–5	Rodríguez (4–4)	**Samardzija** (4–3)	—	18,732	15–29	L9
45	May 25	@ Pirates	0–1	Burnett (3–2)	**Dempster** (0–3)	Hanrahan (11)	29,914	15–30	L10
46	May 26	@ Pirates	2–3	Hanrahan (2–0)	**Dolis** (2–4)	—	38,132	15–31	L11
47	May 27	@ Pirates	4–10	Bédard (3–5)	**Garza** (2–3)	—	27,486	15–32	L12
48	May 28	Padres	11–7	**Wells** (1–1)	Hinshaw (0–1)	—	38,452	16–32	W1
49	May 29	Padres	5–3	**Samardzija** (5–3)	Stults (1–1)	**Russell** (1)	35,219	17–32	W2
50	May 30	Padres	8–6	**Russell** (2–0)	Thayer (0–1)	—	38,516	18–32	W3

June: 10–17 (Home: 6–5; Away: 4–12)

#	Date	Opponent	Score	Win	Loss	Save	Attendance	Record	Streak
51	June 1	@ Giants	3–4	Bumgarner (6–4)	**Maholm** (4–4)	López (1)	41,100	18–33	L1
52	June 2	@ Giants	1–2	Cain (6–2)	**Garza** (2–4)	Romo (1)	41,239	18–34	L2
53	June 3	@ Giants	0–2	Zito (5–2)	**Wood** (0–2)	Romo (2)	41,112	18–35	L3
54	June 4	@ Giants	2–3	Vogelsong (4–2)	**Mármol** (0–2)	Affeldt (1)	41,524	18–36	L4
55	June 5	@ Brewers	10–0	**Dempster** (1–3)	Gallardo (4–5)	—	28,071	19–36	W1
56	June 6	@ Brewers	0–8	Greinke (7–2)	**Maholm** (4–5)	—	27,112	19–37	L1
57	June 7	@ Brewers	3–4 (10)	Axford (1–2)	**Coleman** (0–1)	—	30,123	19–38	L2
58	June 8	@ Twins	7–8 (10)	Capps (1–3)	**Camp** (2–3)	—	38,014	19–39	L3
59	June 9	@ Twins	3–11	Diamond (5–1)	**Samardzija** (5–4)	—	39,309	19–40	L4
60	June 10	@ Twins	8–2	**Dempster** (2–3)	Liriano (1–7)	—	37,526	20–40	W1
61	June 12	Tigers	4–3	**Mármol** (1–2)	Coke (1–3)	**Camp** (1)	41,164	21–40	W2
62	June 13	Tigers	4–8	Porcello (4–4)	**Garza** (2–5)	—	41,326	21–41	L1
63	June 14	Tigers	3–5	Verlander (6–4)	**Wood** (0–3)	Valverde (13)	42,292	21–42	L2
64	June 15	Red Sox	3–0	**Dempster** (3–3)	Matsuzaka (0–2)	**Mármol** (3)	40,073	22–42	W1
65	June 16	Red Sox	3–4	Lester (4–4)	**Samardzija** (5–5)	Aceves (16)	40,766	22–43	L1
66	June 17	Red Sox	4–7	Albers (2–0)	**Camp** (2–4)	—	38,531	22–44	L2
67	June 18	@ White Sox	12–3	**Garza** (3–5)	Stewart (1–2)	—	33,215	23–44	W1
68	June 19	@ White Sox	2–1	**Wood** (1–3)	Peavy (6–3)	**Mármol** (4)	30,282	24–44	W2
69	June 20	@ White Sox	0–7	Floyd (5–7)	**Wells** (1–2)	—	32,311	24–45	L1
70	June 22	@ D-backs	1–6	Ziegler (4–1)	**Samardzija** (5–6)	Hernandez (2)	34,654	24–46	L2
71	June 23	@ D-backs	5–10	Breslow (2–0)	**Maholm** (4–6)	—	38,542	24–47	L3
72	June 24	@ D-backs	1–5	Miley (9–3)	**Garza** (3–6)	—	33,448	24–48	L4
73	June 25	Mets	6–1	**Wood** (2–3)	Santana (5–4)	—	34,092	25–48	W1
74	June 26	Mets	5–3	**Maine** (1–1)	Gee (5–6)	**Mármol** (5)	34,064	26–48	W2
75	June 27	Mets	1–17	Niese (6–3)	**Samardzija** (5–7)	—	35,837	26–49	L1
76	June 29	Astros	4–0	**Maholm** (5–6)	Norris (5–5)	**Mármol** (6)	32,891	27–49	W1
77	June 30	Astros	3–2	**Garza** (4–6)	Happ (6–8)	**Mármol** (7)	37,906	28–49	W2

July: 15–10 (Home: 9–3; Away: 6–7)

#	Date	Opponent	Score	Win	Loss	Save	Attendance	Record	Streak
78	July 1	Astros	3–0	**Wood** (3–3)	Rodríguez (6–6)	**Mármol** (8)	37,389	29–49	W3
79	July 2	@ Braves	4–1	**Samardzija** (6–7)	Hanson (9–5)	**Russell** (2)	22,292	30–49	W4
80	July 3	@ Braves	3–10	Jurrjens (2–2)	**Volstad** (0–7)	—	27,834	30–50	L1
81	July 4	@ Braves	5–1	**Maholm** (6–6)	Delgado (4–9)	—	40,604	31–50	W1
82	July 5	@ Braves	3–7	Minor (5–6)	**Garza** (4–7)	—	24,408	31–51	L1
83	July 6	@ Mets	8–7	**Wood** (4–3)	Santana (6–5)	—	27,956	32–51	W1
84	July 7	@ Mets	1–3	Gee (6–7)	**Samardzija** (6–8)	Parnell (2)	26,096	32–52	L1
85	July 8	@ Mets	7–0	**Dempster** (4–3)	Niese (7–4)	—	25,920	33–52	W1
**83rd All-Star Game in Kansas City, Missouri**
86	July 13	D-backs	8–1	**Maholm** (7–6)	Kennedy (6–8)	—	36,878	34–52	W2
87	July 14	D-backs	4–1	**Dempster** (5–3)	Saunders (4–6)	**Mármol** (9)	38,068	35–52	W3
88	July 15	D-backs	3–1	**Garza** (5–7)	Cahill (7–8)	**Mármol** (10)	36,659	36–52	W4
89	July 17	Marlins	5–9	Sánchez (5–6)	**Wood** (4–4)	—	34,397	36–53	L1
90	July 18	Marlins	5–1 (8)	**Russell** (3–0)	Johnson (5–7)	—	34,934	37–53	W1
91	July 19	Marlins	4–2	**Maholm** (8–6)	Buehrle (9–9)	**Mármol** (11)	32,741	38–53	W2
92	July 20	@ Cardinals	1–4	Lohse (10–2)	**Dempster** (5–4)	Motte (21)	43,786	38–54	L1
93	July 21	@ Cardinals	0–12	Westbrook (8–8)	**Germano** (0–1)	—	43,424	38–55	L2
94	July 22	@ Cardinals	0–7	Lynn (12–4)	**Wood** (4–5)	—	42,411	38–56	L3
95	July 23	@ Pirates	2–0	**Samardzija** (7–8)	Bédard (5–11)	**Mármol** (12)	27,586	39–56	W1
96	July 24	@ Pirates	5–1	**Maholm** (9–6)	McDonald (10–4)	—	32,497	40–56	W2
97	July 25	@ Pirates	2–3	Correia (8–6)	**Dempster** (5–5)	Hanrahan (29)	33,935	40–57	L1
98	July 27	Cardinals	6–9	Lynn (13–4)	**Wood** (4–6)	Motte (23)	40,778	40–58	L2
99	July 28	Cardinals	3–2	**Russell** (4–0)	Kelly (1–4)	**Mármol** (13)	41,276	41–58	W1
100	July 29	Cardinals	4–2 (10)	**Russell** (5–0)	Rosenthal (0–1)	—	39,534	42–58	W2
101	July 30	Pirates	14–4	**Germano** (1–1)	Bédard (5–12)	—	33,337	43–58	W3
102	July 31	Pirates	0–5	Burnett (13–3)	**Coleman** (0–2)	—	33,158	43–59	L1

August: 8–21 (Home: 7–9; Away: 1–12)

#	Date	Opponent	Score	Win	Loss	Save	Attendance	Record	Streak
103	August 1	Pirates	4–8	Karstens (4–2)	**Wood** (4–7)	—	33,014	43–60	L2
104	August 3	@ Dodgers	1–6	Billingsley (7–9)	**Samardzija** (7–9)	—	43,537	43–61	L3
105	August 4	@ Dodgers	1–3	Kershaw (9–6)	**Volstad** (0–8)	Jansen (21)	46,588	43–62	L4
106	August 5	@ Dodgers	6–7	Jansen (5–3)	**Camp** (2–5)	—	42,495	43–63	L5
107	August 6	@ Padres	0–2	Stults (2–2)	**Wood** (4–8)	Street (19)	27,187	43–64	L6
108	August 7	@ Padres	4–7	Ohlendorf (4–2)	**Raley** (0–1)	Street (20)	26,518	43–65	L7
109	August 8	@ Padres	0–2	Richard (9–11)	**Samardzija** (7–10)	—	24,663	43–66	L8
110	August 9	Reds	5–3	**Camp** (3–5)	Marshall (4–4)	**Mármol** (14)	33,397	44–66	W1
111	August 10	Reds	8–10	Bailey (10–7)	**Germano** (1–2)	Chapman (26)	36,891	44–67	L
112	August 11	Reds	2–4	Arroyo (8–7)	**Russell** (5–1)	Chapman (27)	40,602	44–68	L
113	August 12	Reds	0–3	Cueto (15–6)	**Raley** (0–2)	Chapman (28)	35,461	44–69	L
114	August 13	Astros	7–1	**Samardzija** (8–10)	Galarraga (0–3)	—	31,452	45–69	W1
115	August 14	Astros	1–10	Harrell (10–8)	**Volstad** (0–9)	—	33,376	45–70	L
116	August 15	Astros	7–2	**Germano** (2–2)	Norris (5–10)	—	33,714	46–70	W1
117	August 17	@ Reds	3–7	Arroyo (9–7)	**Wood** (4–9)	—	35,332	46–71	L
118	August 18	@ Reds	3–5	Cueto (16–6)	**Samardzija** (8–11)	Chapman (29)	28,754	46–72	L
119	August 18	@ Reds	9–7	**Raley** (1–2)	Redmond (0–1)	**Mármol** (15)	41,236	47–72	W1
120	August 19	@ Reds	4–5	Chapman (5–4)	**Camp** (3–6)	—	41,615	47–73	L
121	August 20	@ Brewers	5–9	Rogers (1–1)	**Germano** (2–3)	—	28,776	47–74	L
122	August 21	@ Brewers	2–5	Estrada (1–5)	**Rusin** (0–1)	Axford (19)	29,179	47–75	L
123	August 22	@ Brewers	2–3	Gallardo (13–8)	**Wood** (4–10)	Axford (20)	30,743	47–76	L
124	August 24	Rockies	5–3	**Russell** (6–1)	Belisle (3–5)	**Mármol** (16)	31,255	48–76	W1
125	August 25	Rockies	3–4	Torres (3–1)	**Corpas** (0–1)	Betancourt (26)	35,296	48–77	L1
126	August 26	Rockies	5–0 (8)	**Volstad** (1–9)	Chacín (1–4)	**Camp** (2)	32,346	49–77	W1
127	August 27	Brewers	4–15	Estrada (2–5)	**Germano** (2–4)	—	32,541	49–78	L1
128	August 28	Brewers	1–4	Gallardo (14–8)	**Wood** (4–11)	Axford (21)	30,017	49–79	L2
129	August 29	Brewers	1–3	Fiers (8–6)	**Samardzija** (8–12)	Axford (22)	33,271	49–80	L3
130	August 30	Brewers	12–11	**Mármol** (2–2)	Rodríguez (2–7)	—	28,859	50–80	W1
131	August 31	Giants	6–4	**Volstad** (2–9)	Bumgarner (14–9)	**Mármol** (17)	32,476	51–80	W2

September: 9–19 (Home: 3–9; Away: 6–10)

#	Date	Opponent	Score	Win	Loss	Save	Attendance	Record	Streak
132	September 1	Giants	2–5	Lincecum (8–14)	**Germano** (2–5)	Romo (9)	32,477	51–81	L1
133	September 2	Giants	5–7	Casilla (6–5)	**Mármol** (2–3)	López (6)	39,760	51–82	L2
134	September 3	@ Nationals	1–2	Detwiler (9–6)	**Samardzija** (8–13)	Clippard (30)	23,215	51–83	L3
135	September 4	@ Nationals	5–11	Jackson (9–9)	**Rusin** (0–2)	—	17,648	51–84	L4
136	September 5	@ Nationals	1–9	Gonzalez (18–7)	**Volstad** (2–10)	—	21,244	51–85	L5
137	September 6	@ Nationals	2–9	Zimmermann (10–8)	**Germano** (2–6)	—	22,447	51–86	L6
138	September 7	@ Pirates	12–2	**Wood** (5–11)	Burnett (15–6)	—	32,699	52–86	W1
139	September 8	@ Pirates	4–3	**Samardzija** (9–13)	Grilli (1–5)	—	35,661	53–86	W2
140	September 9	@ Pirates	4–2	**Russell** (7–1)	Grilli (1–6)	**Mármol** (18)	28,671	54–86	W3
141	September 10	@ Astros	4–1	**Volstad** (3–10)	Rodriguez (1–10)	**Mármol** (19)	13,121	55–86	W4
142	September 11	@ Astros	0–1	Lyles (4–11)	**Germano** (2–7)	López (4)	14,205	55–87	L1
143	September 12	@ Astros	5–1	**Wood** (6–11)	Abad (0–4)	—	13,101	56–87	W1
144	September 14	Pirates	7–4	**Rusin** (1–2)	McDonald (12–8)	**Mármol** (20)	26,946	57–87	W2
145	September 15	Pirates	6–7	Rodríguez (11–13)	**Berken** (0–1)	Hanrahan (35)	32,774	57–88	L1
146	September 16	Pirates	13–9	**Beliveau** (1–0)	Hughes (2–2)	—	33,559	58–88	W1
147	September 17	Pirates	0–3	Correia (11–9)	**Wood** (6–12)	Hanrahan (36)	33,017	58–89	L
148	September 18	Reds	1–3	Bailey (12–9)	**Germano** (2–8)	Broxton (26)	32,547	58–90	L
149	September 19	Reds	5–6 (11)	Ondrusek (5–2)	**Cabrera** (0–1)	Broxton (27)	31,001	58–91	L
150	September 20	Reds	3–5	Cueto (18–9)	**Corpas** (0–2)	Simón (1)	25,891	58–92	L
151	September 21	Cardinals	5–4 (11)	**Cabrera** (1–1)	Kelly (5–7)	—	29,100	59–92	W1
152	September 22	Cardinals	4–5 (10)	Boggs (4–1)	**Chapman** (0–1)	Motte (39)	40,298	59–93	L1
153	September 23	Cardinals	3–6	Lohse (16–3)	**Germano** (2–9)	Motte (40)	33,354	59–94	L2
154	September 25	@ Rockies	5–10 (7)	Torres (5–3)	**Rusin** (1–3)	—	26,660	59–95	L3
155	September 26	@ Rockies	0–6	Pomeranz (2–9)	**Berken** (0–2)	—	27,057	59–96	L4
156	September 27	@ Rockies	5–7	Chacín (3–5)	**Volstad** (3–11)	Betancourt (31)	30,288	59–97	L5
157	September 28	@ D-backs	3–8	Kennedy (15–11)	**Wood** (6–13)	—	28,463	59–98	L6
158	September 29	@ D-backs	2–8	Cahill (13–12)	**Germano** (2–10)	—	29,084	59–99	L7
159	September 30	@ D-backs	7–2	**Rusin** (2–3)	Shaw (1–6)	—	35,535	60–99	W1

October: 1–2 (Home: 1–2; Away: 0–0)

#	Date	Opponent	Score	Win	Loss	Save	Attendance	Record	Streak
160	October 1	Astros	0–3	Harrell (11–11)	**Berken** (0–3)	Wright (1)	32,167	60–100	L1
161	October 2	Astros	0–3	Norris (7–13)	**Volstad** (3–12)	López (10)	33,168	60–101	L2
162	October 3	Astros	5–4	**Mármol** (3–3)	Ambriz (1–1)	—	27,606	61–101	W1

Legend: = Win = Loss = Postponement
Bold = Cubs team member

=== Roster ===
2012 Chicago Cubs
**Roster**
**Pitchers**: 37 Jairo Asencio; 16 Jeff Beliveau; 57 Jason Berken; 28,43 Michael Bowden; 55 Alberto Cabrera; 54 Shawn Camp; 52 Lendy Castillo; 37 Jaye Chapman; 27 Casey Coleman; 60 Manny Corpas; 46 Ryan Dempster; 48 Rafael Dolis; 22 Matt Garza; 41 Justin Germano; 59 Alex Hinshaw; 19 Rodrigo López; 28 Paul Maholm; 57 Scott Maine; 49 Carlos Mármol; 55,50 Blake Parker; 43 Brooks Raley; 18 Chris Rusin; 40 James Russell; 29 Jeff Samardzija; 47 Miguel Socolovich; 32 Chris Volstad; 36 Randy Wells; 34 Kerry Wood; 30 Travis Wood	**Catchers**: 53 Welington Castillo; 51 Steve Clevenger; 55 Koyie Hill; 47 Blake Lalli; 20 Anthony Recker; 18 Geovany Soto; **Infielders**: 3 Jeff Baker; 15 Darwin Barney; 45 Adrian Cardenas; 13 Starlin Castro; 11 Blake DeWitt; 6 Bryan LaHair; 44 Anthony Rizzo; 2 Ian Stewart; 24 Luis Valbuena; 5 Josh Vitters	**Outfielders**: 24 Marlon Byrd; 1 Tony Campana; 9 David DeJesus; 7 Brett Jackson; 5 Reed Johnson; 6 Bryan LaHair; 16,21 Joe Mather; 17 Dave Sappelt; 12 Alfonso Soriano	**Manager**: 33 Dale Sveum; **Coaching Staff**: 4 Pat Listach (third base); 39 Dave McKay (first base); 7 Rudy Jaramillo (hitting); 38 James Rowson (hitting); 95 Andrew Lane (bullpen catcher); 8 Jamie Quirk (bench); 25 Chris Bosio (pitching); 35 Lester Strode (bullpen); 98 Édgar Tovar (bullpen catcher)

== Statistics ==
=== Batting ===
Note: G = Games played; AB = At bats; R = Runs scored; H = Hits; 2B = Doubles; 3B = Triples; HR = Home runs; RBI = Runs batted in; Avg. = Batting average; SB = Stolen bases

Player	G	AB	R	H	2B	3B	HR	RBI	AVG	SB
Jeff Baker	54	134	16	36	10	1	4	20	.269	4
Darwin Barney	156	548	73	139	26	4	7	44	.254	6
Marlon Byrd	13	43	1	3	0	0	0	2	.070	0
Tony Campana	89	174	26	46	6	0	0	5	.264	30
Adrian Cardenas	45	60	5	11	6	0	0	2	.183	0
Welington Castillo	52	170	16	45	11	0	5	22	.265	0
Starlin Castro	162	646	78	183	29	12	14	78	.283	25
Steve Clevenger	69	199	16	40	12	0	1	16	.201	0
David DeJesus	148	506	76	133	28	8	9	50	.263	7
Blake DeWitt	18	29	1	4	1	0	0	1	.138	0
Koyie Hill	11	39	3	7	1	0	0	1	.179	0
Brett Jackson	44	120	14	21	6	1	4	9	.175	0
Reed Johnson	76	169	23	51	9	3	3	16	.302	2
Bryan LaHair	130	340	42	88	17	0	16	40	.259	4
Blake Lalli	6	15	1	2	0	0	0	2	.133	0
Joe Mather	103	225	18	47	11	0	5	19	.209	5
Anthony Recker	9	18	1	3	1	0	1	4	.167	0
Anthony Rizzo	87	337	44	96	15	0	15	48	.285	3
Dave Sappelt	26	69	8	19	6	0	2	8	.275	0
Alfonso Soriano	151	561	68	147	33	2	32	108	.262	6
Geovany Soto	52	176	26	35	6	1	6	14	.199	0
Ian Stewart	55	179	16	36	5	2	5	17	.201	0
Luis Valbuena	90	265	26	58	20	0	4	26	.219	0
Josh Vitters	36	99	7	12	2	0	2	5	.121	2
Jason Berken	4	5	0	0	0	0	0	0	.000	0
Michael Bowden	30	2	0	0	0	0	0	0	.000	0
Casey Coleman	17	3	0	1	0	0	0	0	.333	0
Manny Corpas	48	1	0	0	0	0	0	0	.000	0
Ryan Dempster	16	32	1	3	0	1	0	1	.094	0
Matt Garza	18	30	0	2	1	0	0	0	.067	0
Justin Germano	13	17	1	1	0	0	0	0	.059	0
Paul Maholm	21	39	1	3	0	0	1	3	.077	0
Scott Maine	21	2	0	0	0	0	0	0	.000	0
Brooks Raley	5	10	0	2	0	0	0	0	.200	0
Chris Rusin	7	12	0	2	0	1	0	0	.167	0
James Russell	77	1	0	0	0	0	0	0	.000	0
Jeff Samardzija	31	50	0	5	0	0	0	3	.100	0
Chris Volstad	21	28	0	5	0	0	0	0	.179	0
Randy Wells	12	4	0	1	0	0	0	0	.250	0
Kerry Wood	10	1	0	0	0	0	0	0	.000	0
Travis Wood	28	53	5	10	3	0	1	4	.189	0
Team totals	162	5411	613	1297	265	36	137	570	.240	94

=== Pitching ===
Note: W = Wins; L = Losses; ERA = Earned run average; G = Games pitched; GS = Games started; SV = Saves; IP = Innings pitched; H = Hits allowed; R = Runs allowed; ER = Earned runs allowed; BB = Walks allowed; K = Strikeouts

Player	W	L	ERA	G	GS	SV	IP	H	R	ER	BB	K
Jason Berken	0	3	4.82	4	4	0	18.2	23	14	10	6	11
Ryan Dempster	5	5	2.25	16	16	0	104.0	81	28	26	27	83
Matt Garza	5	7	3.91	18	18	0	103.2	90	48	45	32	96
Justin Germano	2	10	6.75	13	12	0	64.0	81	52	48	21	45
Paul Maholm	9	6	3.74	21	20	0	120.1	115	51	50	36	81
Brooks Raley	1	2	8.14	5	5	0	24.1	33	23	22	11	16
Chris Rusin	2	3	6.37	7	7	0	29.2	38	22	21	11	21
Jeff Samardzija	9	13	3.81	28	28	0	174.2	157	79	74	58	180
Chris Volstad	3	12	6.31	21	21	0	111.1	137	81	78	47	61
Travis Wood	6	13	4.27	26	26	0	156.0	133	80	74	57	119
Jairo Asencio	0	0	3.07	12	0	0	14.2	12	6	5	12	8
Jeff Beliveau	1	0	4.58	22	0	0	17.2	21	9	9	13	17
Michael Bowden	0	0	2.95	30	0	0	36.2	30	12	12	17	29
Alberto Cabrera	1	1	5.40	25	0	0	21.2	16	15	13	19	27
Shawn Camp	3	6	3.59	80	0	2	77.2	79	32	31	25	54
Lendy Castillo	0	1	7.88	13	0	0	16.0	24	16	14	12	13
Jaye Chapman	0	1	3.75	14	0	0	12.0	8	5	5	12	12
Casey Coleman	0	2	7.40	17	1	0	24.1	37	20	20	12	16
Manny Corpas	0	2	5.01	48	0	0	46.2	50	27	26	19	28
Rafael Dolis	2	4	6.39	34	0	4	38.0	40	29	27	24	24
Alex Hinshaw	0	0	135.00	2	0	0	0.1	4	5	5	1	0
Rodrigo López	0	1	5.68	4	0	0	6.1	8	6	4	5	2
Scott Maine	1	1	4.79	21	0	0	20.2	17	11	11	12	26
Carlos Mármol	3	3	3.42	61	0	20	55.1	40	24	21	45	72
Joe Mather	0	0	0.00	1	0	0	0.1	1	0	0	0	0
Blake Parker	0	0	6.00	7	0	0	6.0	10	7	4	6	6
James Russell	7	1	3.25	77	0	2	69.1	67	28	25	30	55
Miguel Socolovich	0	0	4.50	6	0	0	6.0	4	3	3	3	6
Randy Wells	1	2	5.34	12	4	0	28.2	35	18	17	25	14
Kerry Wood	0	2	8.31	10	0	0	8.2	8	8	8	11	6
Team totals	61	101	4.51	162	162	28	1413.2	1399	759	708	573	1128

== Farm system ==
Level	Team	League	Manager
AAA	Iowa Cubs	Pacific Coast League	Dave Bialas
AA	Tennessee Smokies	Southern League	Buddy Bailey
A	Daytona Cubs	Florida State League	Brian Harper
A	Peoria Chiefs	Midwest League	Casey Kopitzke
A-Short Season	Boise Hawks	Northwest League	Mark Johnson
Rookie	AZL Cubs	Arizona League	Bobby Mitchell
