= Josh Vitters =

American baseball player (born 1989)

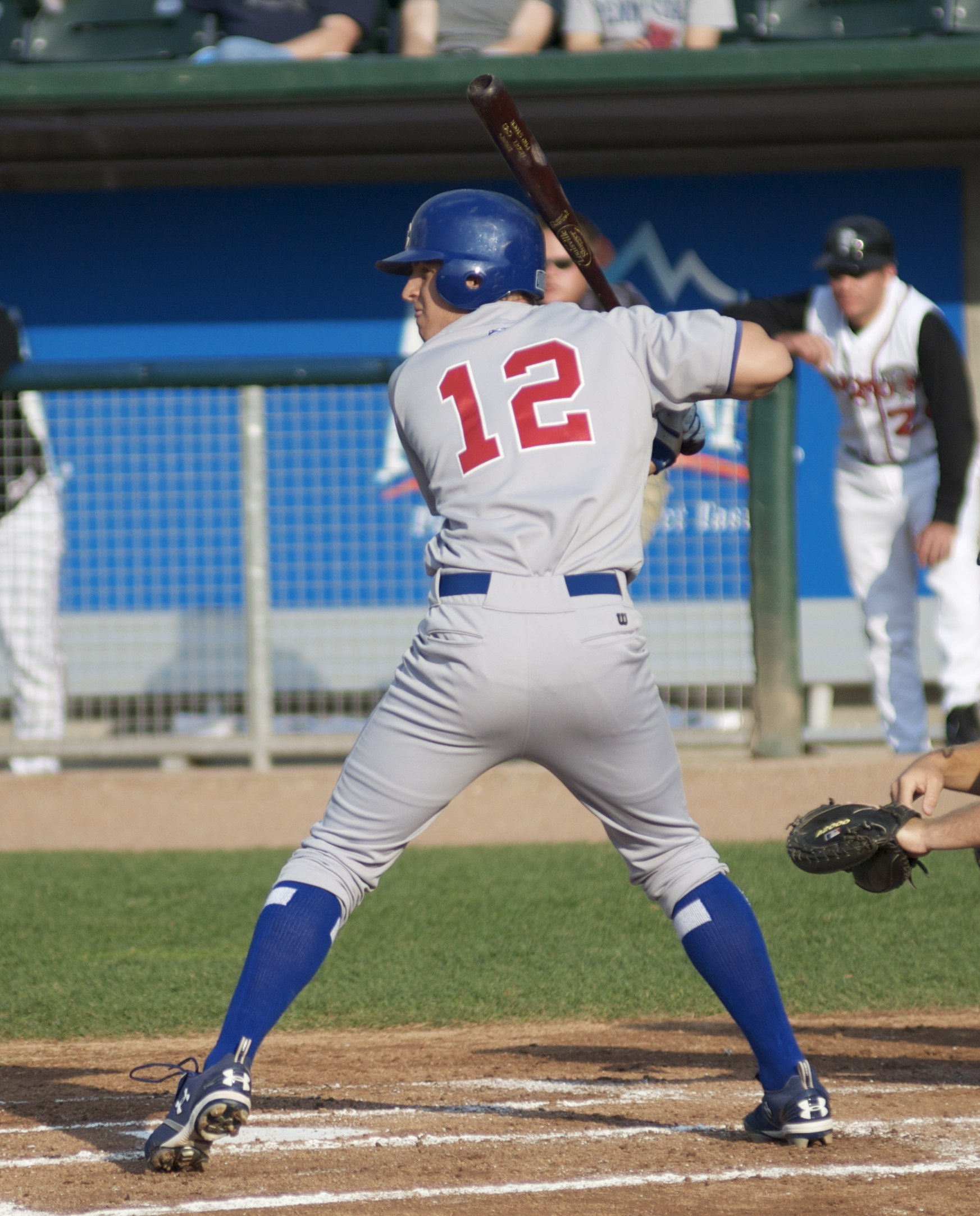
- Vitters with the Peoria Chiefs
- Third baseman/ Left fielder
- Born: August 27, 1989 (age 36); Anaheim, California, U.S.
- Batted: Right Threw: Right

MLB debut
- August 5, 2012, for the Chicago Cubs

Last MLB appearance
- October 3, 2012, for the Chicago Cubs

MLB statistics
- Batting average: .121
- Home runs: 2
- Runs batted in: 5
- Stats at Baseball Reference

Teams
- Chicago Cubs (2012)

Joshua Warren Vitters (born August 27, 1989) is an American former professional baseball third baseman. He played in Major League Baseball (MLB) for the Chicago Cubs in 2012.

== Amateur career ==
Vitters was an AFLAC All-American Prep Third Baseman for Cypress High School in Cypress, California. He was also named the Gatorade Baseball Player of the Year for California in 2007. Vitters committed to attend Arizona State University on a scholarship, to play for the Arizona State Sun Devils baseball team.

== Professional career ==
=== Chicago Cubs ===
The Chicago Cubs drafted Vitters with the third overall selection of the 2007 Major League Baseball draft. He made his professional debut with the Rookie-level Arizona Cubs of the Arizona League. Vitters split the 2008 season between the Low-A Boise Hawks and the Single-A Peoria Chiefs, logging a .322/.357/.495 slash line with 5 home runs and 38 RBI in 65 games.

Vitters was selected to appear in the 2009 All-Star Futures Game. In mid-2009, the Cubs promoted Vitters from the Peoria Chiefs of the Single-A Midwest League to the Daytona Cubs of the High-A Florida State League. He spent the 2010 season with Daytona and the Tennessee Smokies of the Double-A Southern League. He returned to Tennessee for the 2011 and hit .283 with 14 home runs.

The Cubs promoted Vitters and fellow prospect Brett Jackson from the Iowa Cubs of the Triple-A Pacific Coast League on August 5, 2012. He made his Major League debut later that day as a pinch hitter in the seventh inning against the Los Angeles Dodgers On August 7, 2012, Vitters pinch hit for pitcher Jeff Beliveau and collected his first MLB hit, a double against the San Diego Padres in the seventh inning, scoring both Steve Clevenger and Darwin Barney. His first major league home run was on August 20, 2012, in the fifth inning against Mark Rogers of the Milwaukee Brewers. On October 11, 2012, he was started playing in Venezuelan Professional Baseball League with the Leones del Caracas and appeared 2 games. Vitters split the 2013 season between Iowa and the AZL Cubs, slashing .267/.368/.475 in 33 games between the two teams. He spent the entire 2014 season in Iowa as well, batting .213/.268/.339 with 11 home runs and 38 RBI in 112 games. On October 29, 2014, Vitters was outrighted off of the 40-man roster. On November 4, he was granted free agency.

=== Bridgeport Bluefish ===
On March 15, 2016, Vitters signed with the Bridgeport Bluefish of the Atlantic League of Professional Baseball. In 80 games with Bridgeport, Vitters batted .226/.302/.343 with 5 home runs and 25 RBI.

=== Sioux City Explorers ===
On March 16, 2017, Vitters signed with the Sioux City Explorers of the American Association of Independent Professional Baseball. He was released on June 21, 2017 after posting a slash line of .185/.220/.254 in 50 games.

=== Québec Capitales ===
On April 12, 2018, Vitters signed with the Québec Capitales of the Can-Am League. He was released on June 24 after hitting .247/.326/.346 with 1 home run and 6 RBI in 25 games.

=== York Revolution ===
On March 10, 2020, Vitters signed with the York Revolution of the Atlantic League of Professional Baseball. He did not play a game for the team because of the cancellation of the ALPB season due to the COVID-19 pandemic and became a free agent after the year. On April 26, 2021, Vitters re-signed with the Revolution for the 2021 season. In 20 games with York, Vitters slashed .157/.254/.157 with no home runs and 5 RBI. On June 24, Vitters again announced his retirement from professional baseball.

== Personal ==
Josh's brother, Christian, played minor league baseball.
