= Miguel Socolovich =

Venezuelan-Serbian baseball player (born 1986)

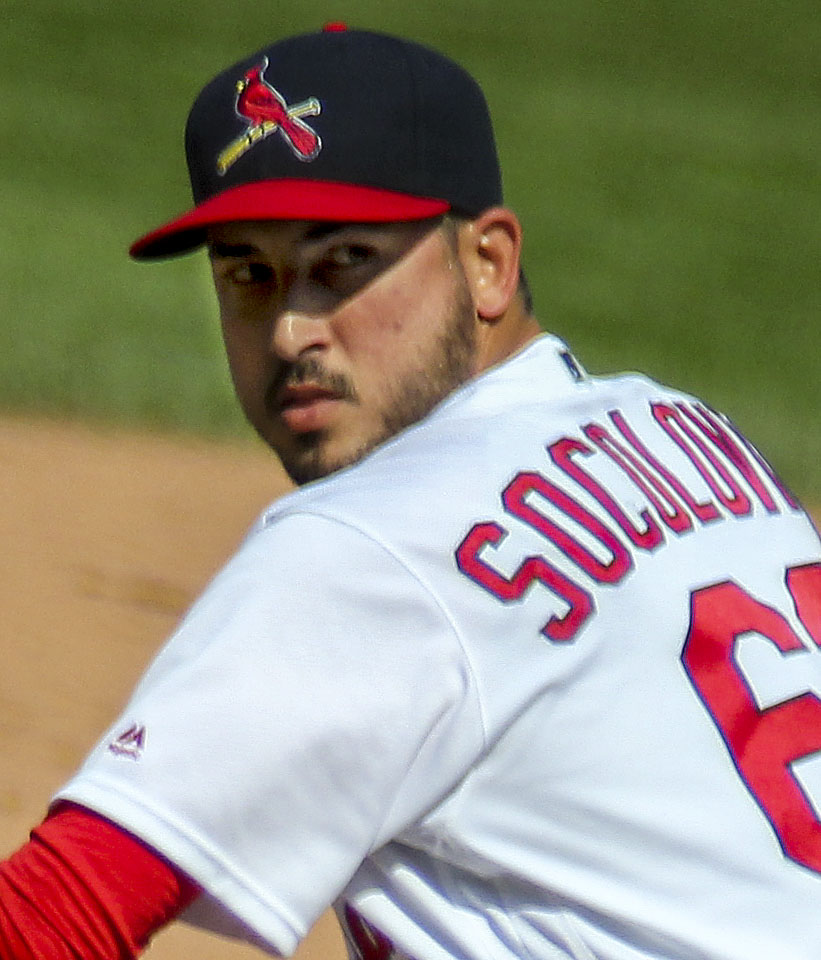
- Socolovich with the St. Louis Cardinals in 2016
- Pitcher
- Born: July 24, 1986 (age 39); Caracas, Venezuela
- Batted: Right Threw: Right

Professional debut
- MLB: July 14, 2012, for the Baltimore Orioles
- NPB: May 6, 2013, for the Hiroshima Toyo Carp

Last appearance
- NPB: August 28, 2013, for the Hiroshima Toyo Carp
- MLB: June 2, 2018, for the Atlanta Braves

MLB statistics
- Win–loss record: 5–3
- Earned run average: 4.62
- Strikeouts: 73

NPB statistics
- Win–loss record: 0–0
- Earned run average: 0.79
- Strikeouts: 6
- Stats at Baseball Reference

Teams
- Baltimore Orioles (2012); Chicago Cubs (2012); Hiroshima Toyo Carp (2013); St. Louis Cardinals (2015–2017); Atlanta Braves (2018)

Miguel Ángel Socolovich (Serbian Cyrillic: Мигел Соколовић, born July 24, 1986) is a Venezuela-Serbian former professional baseball pitcher. He played in Major League Baseball (MLB) for the Baltimore Orioles, Chicago Cubs, St. Louis Cardinals, and Atlanta Braves, and in Nippon Professional Baseball (NPB) for the Hiroshima Toyo Carp.

== Playing career ==
=== Boston Red Sox ===
Socolovich signed with the Boston Red Sox as an international free agent in 2004. He appears to have played for the Venezuelan Summer League Red Sox in 2004, although statistics for the season are lacking. Socolovich did not play in 2005, after undergoing Tommy John surgery on his right elbow. He played in 2006 for the Gulf Coast League Red Sox. Socolovich moved up to Single-A the following year, playing for the Lowell Spinners and later the Greenville Drive.

=== Chicago White Sox ===
On January 28, 2008, the Red Sox traded Socolovich and fellow pitching prospect Willy Mota to the Chicago White Sox in exchange for David Aardsma. Socolovich spent the next four seasons playing in the White Sox organization, taking the field for the Single-A Kannapolis Intimidators and Winston-Salem Dash, Double-A Birmingham Barons, and the Triple-A Charlotte Knights during that time.

=== Baltimore Orioles ===
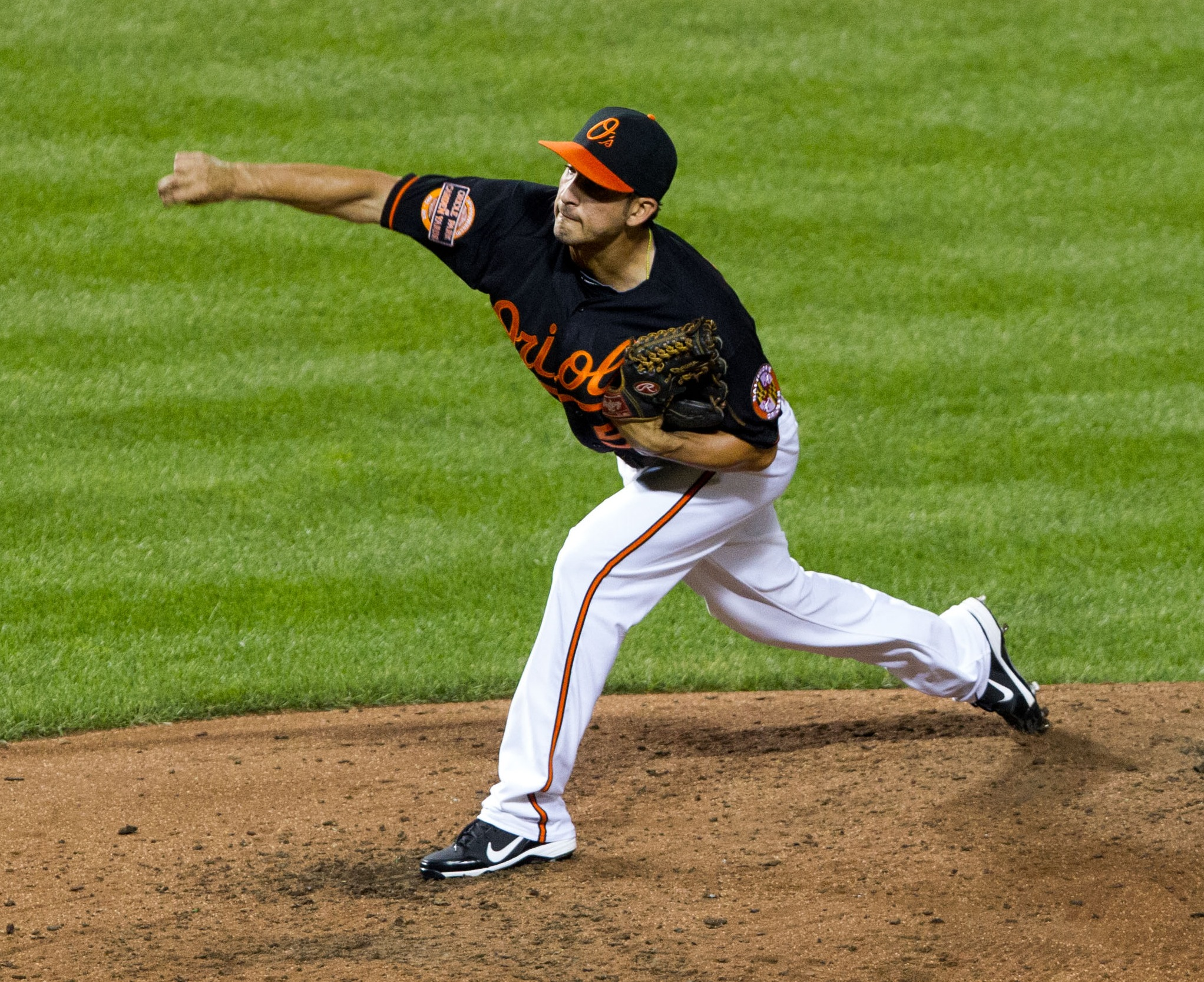
Socolovich hurling for the Orioles.

Socolovich became a free agent and on January 30, 2012, he signed a minor league contract with the Baltimore Orioles organization.

==== Major League debut (2012) ====
He began the 2012 season playing in Triple-A with the Norfolk Tides before earning his first call-up to the major leagues on July 14, 2012. At the time of his call-up, he had a 1.95 earned run average (ERA) in 24 games with Norfolk. He made six appearances with the Orioles before being designated for assignment on August 14. He recorded a 6.97 ERA in 10 1/3 innings during his time in Baltimore. With Norfolk that year, he held a 4−0 win−loss record (W−L) with a 1.90 ERA in 28 appearances and 52 innings pitched (IP), striking out 52 and walking 14 while holding opponents to a .179 batting average against.

=== Chicago Cubs ===
On August 23, 2012, Socolovich was claimed off waivers by the Chicago Cubs, who optioned him to the Iowa Cubs, their Triple-A affiliate in the Pacific Coast League (PCL). In three appearances for Iowa, he posted a 5.40 ERA with five strikeouts across 3 1/3 innings pitched. Socolovich made six appearances for Chicago, recording a 4.50 ERA with six strikeouts over six innings of work. On October 25, Socolovich was removed from the 40-man roster and sent outright to Iowa.

=== Hiroshima Toyo Carp ===
On November 15, 2012, the Hiroshima Toyo Carp of Nippon Professional Baseball agreed to terms with Socolovich to bring him to Japan. Socolovich made 11 appearances for the Carp in 2013, compiling an 0-2 record and 0.79 ERA with six strikeouts across 11 1/3 innings pitched.

=== New York Mets ===
On November 21, 2013, Socolovich signed a minor league contract with the New York Mets. Socolovich pitched in 41 games for the Triple-A Las Vegas 51s during the 2014 season, registering a 2-2 record and 3.64 ERA with 68 strikeouts and three saves across 59 1/3 innings pitched.

=== St. Louis Cardinals ===
Socolovich joined the St. Louis Cardinals organization on November 12, 2014, who optioned him to the Triple-A Memphis Redbirds of the PCL. He began the season with a 12 1/3-inning scoreless streak. During that streak, he walked eight, struck out nine, and allowed five hits in fourteen at bats.

The Cardinals called Socolovich up for the first time in 2015 on April 30. He earned his first major league victory on May 3, 2015, after pitching a scoreless 14th inning against the Pittsburgh Pirates. He earned his second victory the following night, against the Chicago Cubs, who would finish two games and three games, respectively, behind first-place St. Louis in the National League Central division. The Cardinals optioned him back to Memphis, where he posted a 2.48 ERA and an .165 opponent average and 0.92 WHIP in 32 2/3 IP for the season, and recalled him September 2. At the major league level in 2015, he finished with a 1.82 ERA and 4−1 record.

Beginning the 2016 season at Memphis, Socolovich authored an 11-inning scoreless streak over nine appearances through June 21. The Cardinals recalled him to St. Louis on July 19 after third baseman Jhonny Peralta went on the disabled list. His pitch arsenal includes a fastball, changeup, and slider. At Memphis, Socolovich was 2−5 with a 2.79 ERA in 35 games, inducing 40 strikeouts in 38 2/3 IP.

Socolovich was designated for assignment on May 27, 2017. He was 0–1 with one save in 15 appearances, striking out 14 in 18 2/3 innings. He elected free agency following the season on November 6.

=== Atlanta Braves ===
On January 26, 2018, Socolovich was invited to spring training with the Atlanta Braves. His contract was purchased by the Braves on March 30. Socolovich was later designated for assignment on April 2 in order to make room for Aníbal Sánchez on the active roster. He cleared waivers and was sent outright to the Triple-A Gwinnett Stripers on April 5. Socolovich had his contract purchased again on April 21, to fill the roster spot vacated by Josh Ravin's removal from the roster. On April 26, he was removed from the 40-man roster and sent outright to Gwinnett for a second time. Socolovich was again recalled to the Braves on May 30. On June 3, Socolovich was removed from the 40-man roster and sent outright to Gwinnett following Luiz Gohara's activation from the bereavement list. In four total appearances for Atlanta on the season, he posted an 0-1 record and 10.80 ERA with four strikeouts over five innings of work. Socolovich elected free agency on October 2.

=== Guerreros de Oaxaca ===
On January 30, 2019, Socolovich signed with the Guerreros de Oaxaca of the Mexican League. In 40 appearances out of the bullpen for Oaxaca, he compiled an 0-3 record and 3.86 ERA with 37 strikeouts and 23 saves across 42 innings pitched. Socolovich was released by the Guerreros on December 19.

On January 21, 2024, Socolovich officially announced his retirement from pitching via an Instagram post.

== Coaching career ==
In 2025, Socolovich was named as a pitching coach for the Florida Complex League Rays, the rookie-level affiliate of the Tampa Bay Rays.
