= Jeff Beliveau =

American baseball player (born 1987)

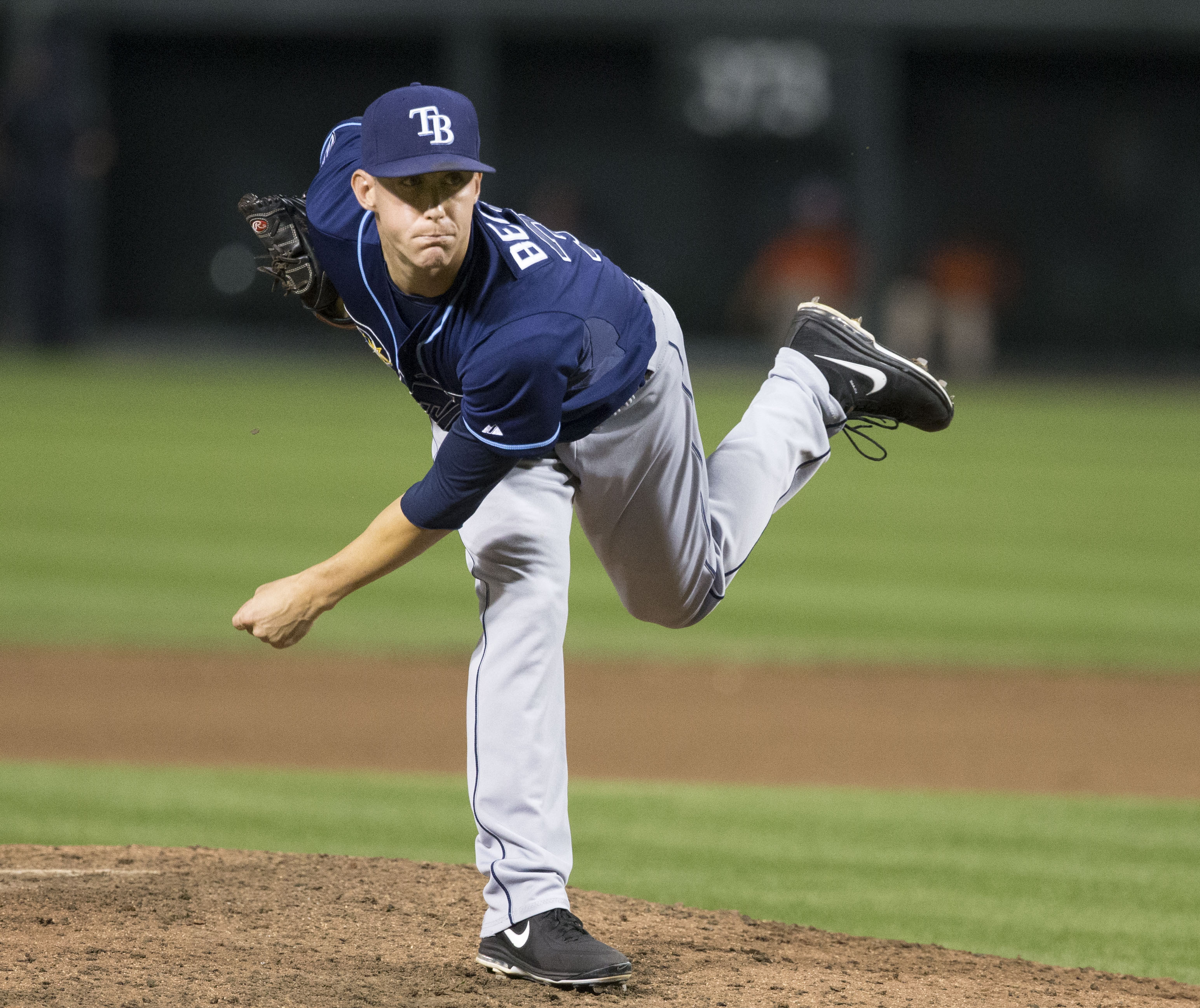
- Beliveau with the Tampa Bay Rays

Free agent
- Pitcher
- Born: January 17, 1987 (age 39); Johnston, Rhode Island, U.S.
- Bats: Left Throws: Left

MLB debut
- July 22, 2012, for the Chicago Cubs

MLB statistics (through 2018 season)
- Win–loss record: 2–1
- Earned run average: 5.37
- Strikeouts: 66
- Stats at Baseball Reference

Teams
- Chicago Cubs (2012); Tampa Bay Rays (2013–2015); Toronto Blue Jays (2017); Cleveland Indians (2018)
Medals
Men's baseball
Representing United States
Pan American Games
Silver medal – second place	2011 Guadalajara	National team

Jeffrey Ryan Beliveau (born January 17, 1987) is an American professional baseball pitcher who is a free agent. He has previously played in Major League Baseball (MLB) for the Chicago Cubs, Tampa Bay Rays, Toronto Blue Jays, and Cleveland Indians.

As an amateur, Beliveau played college baseball at Florida Atlantic University and the College of Charleston. He has also competed for the United States national baseball team.

== High school and college ==
Beliveau attended Bishop Hendricken High School in Warwick, Rhode Island. Originally an outfielder, Beliveau tried out for the team as a pitcher between his junior and senior seasons. As a senior in 2005, Beliveau had a 10-0 win–loss record with a 0.71 earned run average, which saw him named the Gatorade High School Player of the Year for Rhode Island.

Beliveau then enrolled at College of Charleston, where he played college baseball for the College of Charleston Cougars baseball team in the Southern Conference of the National Collegiate Athletic Association's (NCAA) Division I. In two years at College of Charleston, Beliveau had a 9–5 record, and the team reached the Super Regionals in 2006. Later that summer, he played for the Newport Gulls of the New England Collegiate Baseball League, compiling a 2–0 record with a 1.25 earned run average and helping the Gulls to a league record 32–10 season. He transferred Florida Atlantic University for his junior season in 2008, where he played for the Florida Atlantic Owls baseball team in the Sun Belt Conference. Beliveau led all Owls pitchers with 78 strikeouts in 76 2/3 innings pitched.

== Professional career ==
=== Chicago Cubs ===
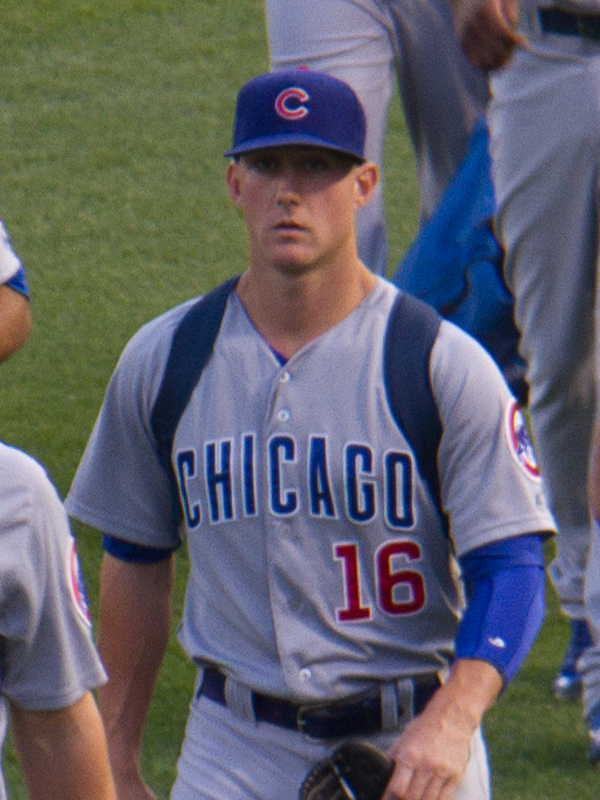
Beliveau during his tenure with the Chicago Cubs in 2012

The Chicago Cubs drafted Beliveau in the 18th round (551st overall) of the 2008 MLB draft. After signing with the Cubs, he appeared in one game for the Arizona League Cubs in the rookie-level Arizona League, before receiving a promotion to the Boise Hawks of the Low-A Northwest League. In 2008, he had a combined 2–1 record, a 2.80 earned run average, 52 strikeouts and 28 walks in 35 1/3 innings. Beliveau joined the Peoria Chiefs of the Single-A Midwest League in 2009, earning a promotion to the Daytona Cubs of the High-A Florida State League in 2010. Beliveau pitched for Daytona and the Tennessee Smokies of the Double-A Southern League in 2011. The Cubs added Beliveau to their 40-man roster after the 2011 season to protect him from the Rule 5 draft.

Beliveau made his MLB debut with the Cubs on July 22, 2012. The Cubs designated him for assignment after the season.

=== Texas Rangers ===
On December 21, 2012, Beliveau was claimed off waivers by the Texas Rangers, who optioned him to the Round Rock Express of the Triple-A Pacific Coast League for the start of the 2013 season. He made one scoreless appearance for Round Rock, allowing one hit across two innings pitched. On April 8, 2013, Beliveau was designated for assignment following the acquisition of Robinson Chirinos.

=== Tampa Bay Rays ===
The Rangers traded Beliveau to the Tampa Bay Rays on April 16, 2013. On August 27, Beliveau was recalled by the Rays from the Triple-A Durham Bulls. He did not get into any games before being optioned to the Double-A Montgomery Biscuits on August 29. He was recalled on September 21 after an 18-inning game against the Baltimore Orioles. In 2014, Beliveau made 30 relief appearances and posted a 2.63 earned run average and 28 strikeouts in 24 innings.

In 2015, Beliveau made five appearances for Tampa Bay, but struggled to a 13.50 ERA with two strikeouts across 2 2/3 innings pitched. On April 23, 2015, Beliveau underwent surgery to repair a torn left shoulder labrum. On November 6, Beliveau was removed from the 40-man roster and sent outright to Durham, but he rejected the assignment and elected free agency.

=== Baltimore Orioles ===
Beliveau signed a minor league contract with the Baltimore Orioles on December 5, 2015. He spent the 2016 season with the High-A Frederick Keys and the Double-A Bowie Baysox, where he had a combined 4–0 record, 2.54 earned run average, and 66 strikeouts in 49 2/3 innings. He elected free agency following the season on November 7, 2016.

=== Toronto Blue Jays ===
On December 15, 2016, Beliveau signed a minor league contract with the Toronto Blue Jays that included an invitation to spring training. Beliveau started the 2017 season with the Triple-A Buffalo Bisons. He was called up by the Blue Jays on June 5, 2017, while the team was in Oakland. In 19 appearances for the Blue Jays, Beliveau posted a 1-1 record and 7.47 ERA with 17 strikeouts across 15 2/3 innings pitched. On July 22, Beliveau was designated for assignment by Toronto. He cleared waivers and was sent outright to Buffalo on July 25. On October 13, Beliveau elected free agency.

=== Cleveland Indians ===
On November 22, 2017, Beliveau was signed by the Cleveland Indians to a minor league contract that included an invitation to the club's 2018 spring training camp.

Beliveau's contract was purchased by the Indians on April 26, 2018. He was designated for assignment following the promotion of Alexi Ogando on May 4. Beliveau cleared waivers and was sent outright to the Triple-A Columbus Clippers on May 8. On May 29, the Indians selected Beliveau's contract, adding him back to their active roster. In nine total appearances for Cleveland, he struggled to an 11.57 ERA with two strikeouts and one save across 4 2/3 innings pitched. Beliveau was designated for assignment following the signing of Óliver Pérez on June 2. He cleared waivers and was sent outright back to Triple-A Columbus on June 5. Beliveau was released by the organization on August 8.

== International career ==
After the 2011 season, Beliveau played for the United States national baseball team in the 2011 Baseball World Cup and the 2011 Pan American Games, winning the silver medal.
