= Alberto Cabrera (baseball) =

Dominican baseball player (born 1988)

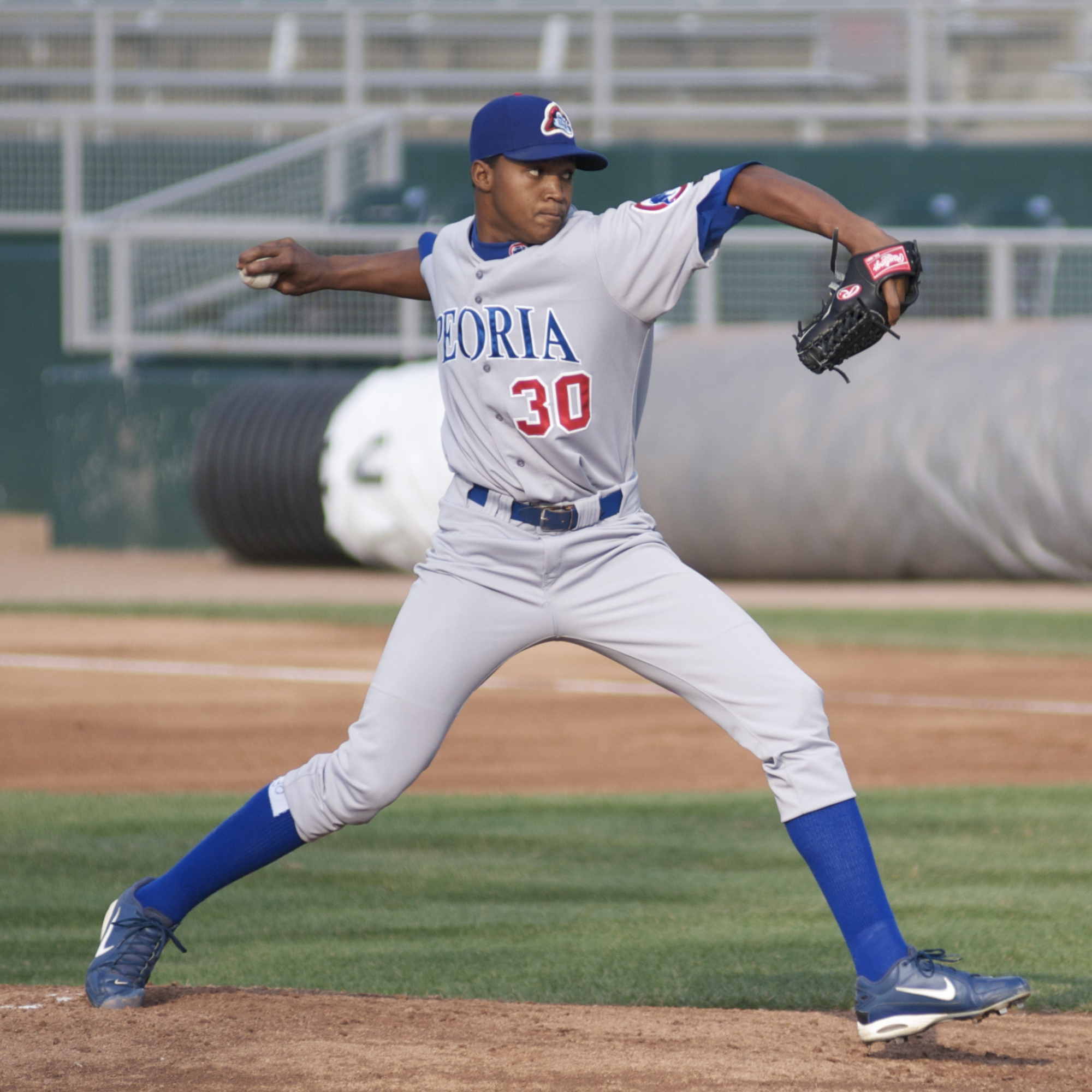
- Cabrera with the Peoria Chiefs
- Pitcher
- Born: October 25, 1988 (age 37); San Juan, Dominican Republic
- Batted: Right Threw: Right

MLB debut
- August 1, 2012, for the Chicago Cubs

Last MLB appearance
- September 27, 2013, for the Chicago Cubs

MLB statistics
- Win–loss record: 1–1
- Earned run average: 5.20
- Strikeouts: 31
- Stats at Baseball Reference

Teams
- Chicago Cubs (2012–2013)

Alberto Antonio Cabrera (born October 25, 1988) is a Dominican former professional baseball pitcher. He played in Major League Baseball (MLB) for the Chicago Cubs.

== Career ==
=== Chicago Cubs ===
On July 7, 2005, Cabrera signed with the Chicago Cubs organization as an international free agent. He made his professional debut in 2006 with the Dominican Summer League Cubs, posting a 5-6 record and 2.27 ERA with 55 strikeouts in 15 games (14 starts). Cabrera spent the 2007 season with the Low-A Boise Hawks, logging a 3-3 record and 5.40 ERA with 33 strikeouts across 38 1/3 innings pitched.

Cabrera spent the 2008 and 2009 seasons with the Single-A Peoria Chiefs. In 2008, he posted a 4-6 record and 5.71 ERA with 37 strikeouts in 12 games (11 starts); in 2009, he logged an 8-2 record and 4.48 ERA with 73 strikeouts and one save over 27 contests (eight starts). Cabrera split the 2010 season between the High-A Daytona Cubs and Double-A Tennessee Smokies. In 28 appearances (26 starts) for the two affiliates, he played a cumulative 7-9 record and 4.24 ERA with 125 strikeouts over 136 innings of work.

On November 19, 2010, the Cubs added Cabrera to their 40-man roster to protect him from the Rule 5 draft. He made 28 appearances (26 starts) split between Tennessee and the Triple-A Iowa Cubs in 2011, registering a cumulative 9-8 record and 6.16 ERA with 101 strikeouts across 137 1/3 innings pitched.

Cabrera began the 2012 season with Tennessee, and was later promoted to the Triple-A Iowa Cubs. On August 1, 2012, Cabrera was promoted to the major leagues for the first time. He made his MLB debut that day against the Pittsburgh Pirates. Cabrera made 25 appearances for Chicago during his rookie campaign, compiling a 1-1 record and 5.40 ERA with 27 strikeouts across 21 2/3 innings pitched.

Cabrera made seven appearances for the Cubs during the 2013 campaign, recording a 4.50 ERA with four strikeouts over six innings of work. Cabrera was designated for assignment on March 30, 2014, after losing the competition for the final Opening Day bullpen spot to Brian Schlitter. He spent the entirety of the 2014 season with Triple-A Iowa, pitching to a 4-2 record and 3.29 ERA with 61 strikeouts and two saves.

=== Detroit Tigers ===
On December 5, 2014, Cabrera signed a minor league contract with the Detroit Tigers organization. He spent the 2015 season with the Triple-A Toledo Mud Hens, compiling a 3-2 record and 6.59 ERA with 47 strikeouts and nine saves across 47 relief appearances. Cabrera elected free agency following the season on November 6, 2015.

== Personal ==
His brother, Mauricio Cabrera, played baseball professionally for the Atlanta Braves.
