= Jaye Chapman =

American baseball pitcher (born 1987)

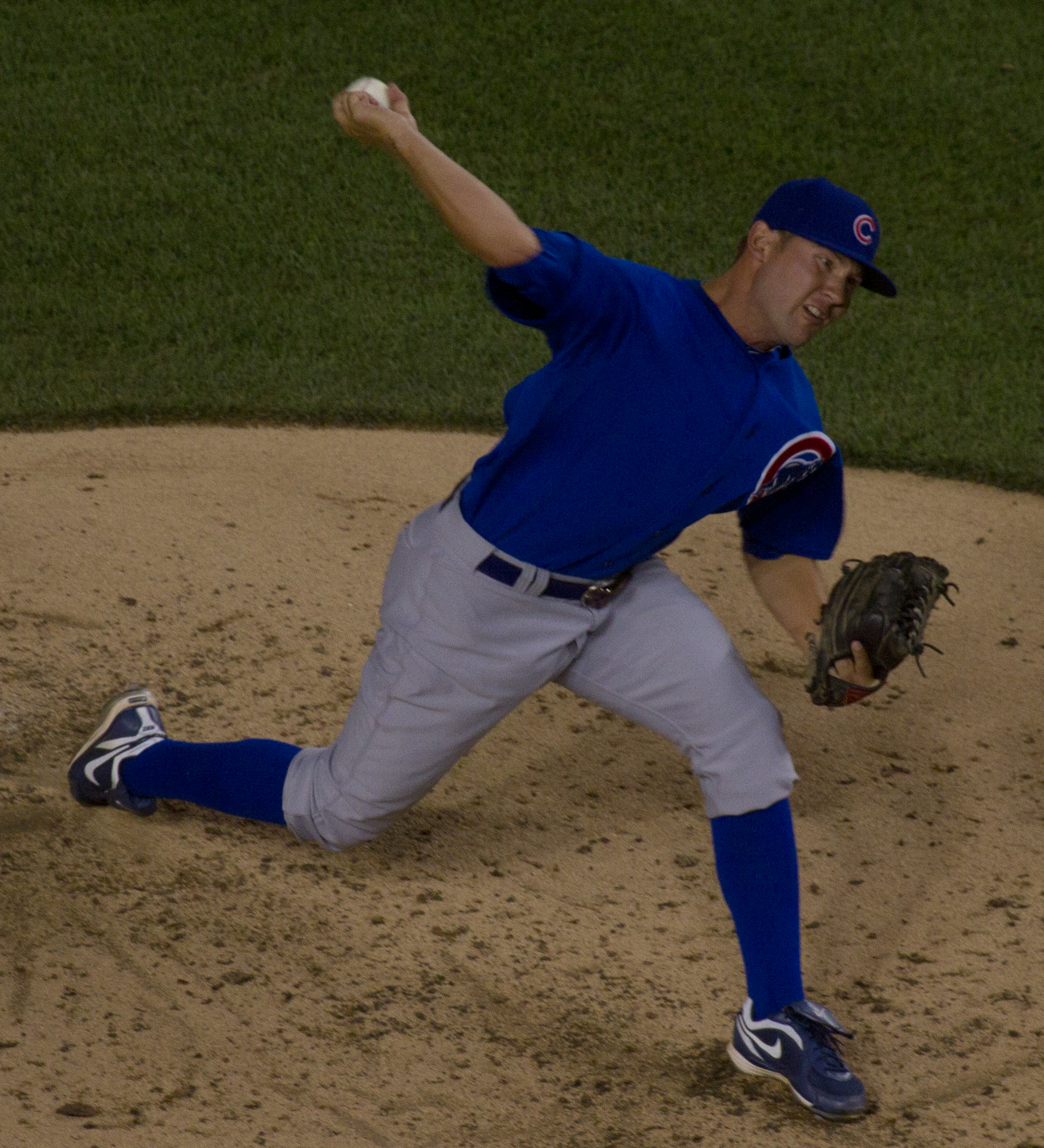
- Chapman with the Chicago Cubs
- Pitcher
- Born: May 22, 1987 (age 39); Panama City, Florida, U.S.
- Batted: Right Threw: Right

MLB debut
- September 4, 2012, for the Chicago Cubs

Last MLB appearance
- October 3, 2012, for the Chicago Cubs

MLB statistics
- Win–loss record: 0–1
- Earned run average: 3.75
- Strikeouts: 12
- Stats at Baseball Reference

Teams
- Chicago Cubs (2012)

Jaye Lawrence Chapman (born May 22, 1987) is an American former professional baseball pitcher. He played in Major League Baseball (MLB) for the Chicago Cubs.

== Career ==
=== Atlanta Braves ===
Chapman was drafted by the Atlanta Braves in the 16th round of the 2005 MLB draft out of A. Crawford Mosley High School in Lynn Haven, Florida. He played for Jed Douglas. The Braves added him to the 40–man roster after the 2011 season to protect him from the Rule 5 draft.

=== Chicago Cubs ===
Chapman was traded to the Chicago Cubs with Arodys Vizcaíno for Reed Johnson and Paul Maholm in July 2012.

Chapman made his major league debut on September 4, 2012, against the Washington Nationals.

=== Bridgeport Bluefish ===
Chapman signed with the Bridgeport Bluefish of the Atlantic League for the 2014 season. He pitched to a 2–3 record with a 3.86 ERA in 50 games for the Bluefish.

=== Milwaukee Brewers ===
On November 15, 2014, Chapman was signed to a minor league contract by the Milwaukee Brewers.

He was invited to spring training by the Brewers for the 2016 season.

=== Tampa Bay Rays ===
On July 10, 2016, Chapman was traded to the Tampa Bay Rays in exchange for cash considerations. He made 22 appearances out of the bullpen, compiling a 4.43 ERA with 26 strikeouts and 9 saves across 20 1/3 innings pitched. Chapman elected free agency following the season on November 7.

=== Texas Rangers ===
On January 5, 2017, Chapman signed a minor league contract with the Texas Rangers. In 31 games split between the rookie–level Arizona League Rangers, Double–A Frisco RoughRiders, and Triple–A Round Rock Express, he struggled to a 6.63 ERA with 28 strikeouts across 36 2/3 innings pitched. Chapman was released by the Rangers organization on August 7.
