= Reed Johnson =

American baseball player (born 1976)

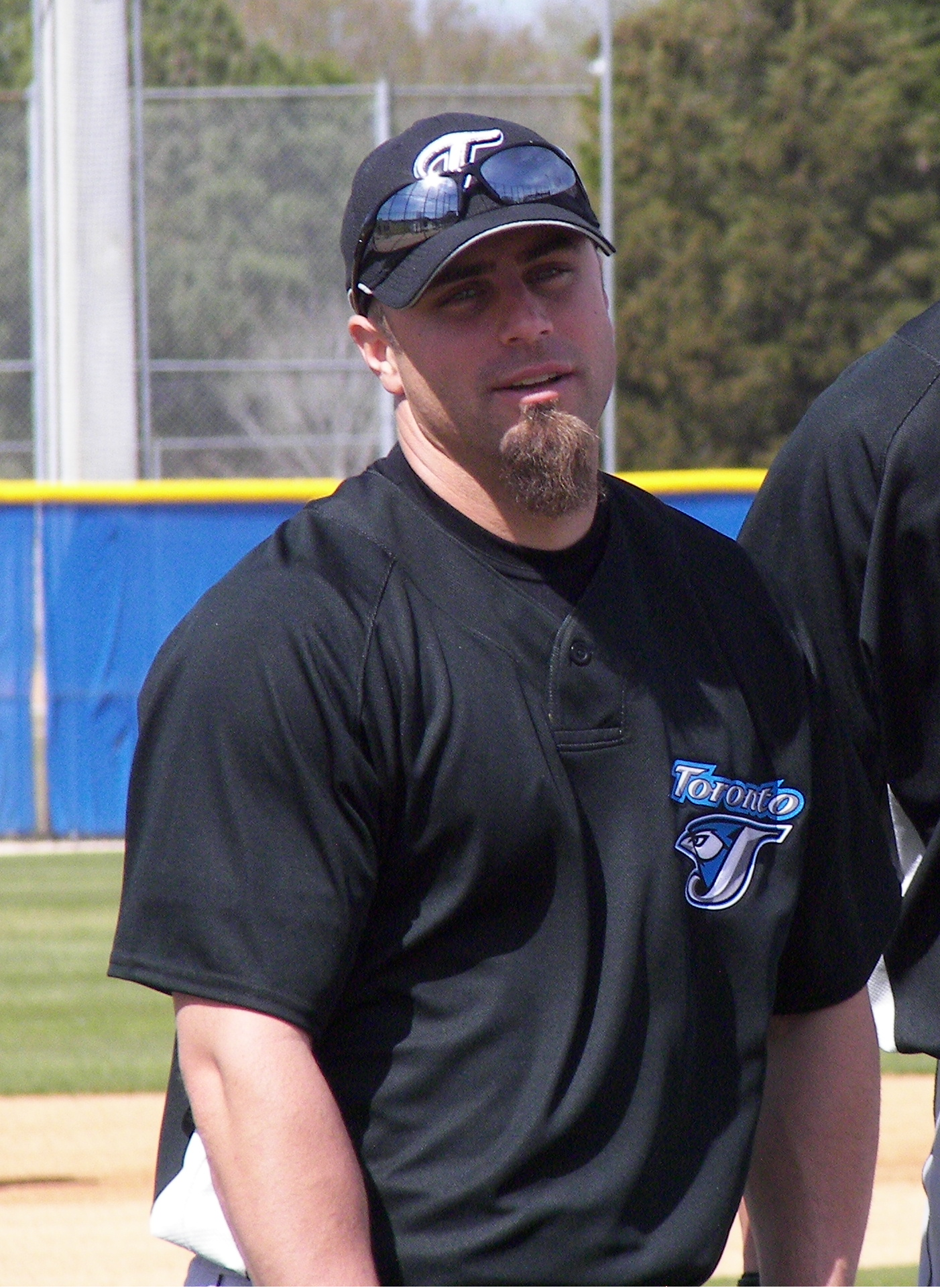
- Johnson with the Toronto Blue Jays in 2007
- Outfielder
- Born: December 8, 1976 (age 49); Riverside, California, U.S.
- Batted: Right Threw: Right

MLB debut
- April 17, 2003, for the Toronto Blue Jays

Last MLB appearance
- October 3, 2015, for the Washington Nationals

MLB statistics
- Batting average: .279
- Home runs: 65
- Runs batted in: 408
- Stats at Baseball Reference

Teams
- Toronto Blue Jays (2003–2007); Chicago Cubs (2008–2009); Los Angeles Dodgers (2010); Chicago Cubs (2011–2012); Atlanta Braves (2012–2013); Miami Marlins (2014); Washington Nationals (2015)

Reed Cameron Johnson (born December 8, 1976) is an American former professional baseball outfielder. He played in Major League Baseball (MLB) for the Toronto Blue Jays, Chicago Cubs, Los Angeles Dodgers, Atlanta Braves, Miami Marlins, and Washington Nationals.

== College career ==
Johnson was born in Riverside, California and grew up in Temecula, in southern Riverside County. He attended Temecula Valley High School, where he participated in baseball and soccer. He was an All-League and an All-County selection.

Johnson attended college at Cal State Fullerton and was named an Academic All-American. He also set records by being the first Cal State Fullerton player to score 100 runs and collect 100 hits in a season. In 1998, he played collegiate summer baseball with the Brewster Whitecaps of the Cape Cod Baseball League.

== Professional career ==
=== Toronto Blue Jays ===
Johnson was drafted by the Toronto Blue Jays in the 17th round of the 1999 MLB draft. In the minors, he was a Southern League All-Star in 2001 with the Tennessee Smokies, while hitting .314 with 13 home runs and 74 RBI. Johnson made his Major League debut on April 17, 2003 against the New York Yankees as a pinch runner. He recorded his first major league hit on April 20, 2003 against Boston Red Sox pitcher Casey Fossum and his first home run on May 17, 2003 against Jeremy Affeldt of the Kansas City Royals . He finished his rookie season, with a .294 batting average, 10 home runs, and 52 runs batted in. Johnson also won the American League Rookie of the Month Award for the month of September.

Johnson is one of only six or seven batters to have hit both a leadoff and walk-off home run in the same game, the others being Billy Hamilton (1893, disputed), Vic Power (1957), Darin Erstad (2000), Ian Kinsler (2009), Chris Young (2010), and Pete Crow-Armstrong (2026).

Johnson extended his tenure with the Blue Jays on December 7, 2005, after signing a one-year extension worth $1,425,000.

At the start the 2006 season, Johnson was platooned with Frank Catalanotto in left field, as they had been for the previous two seasons. In a Toronto Star article, Johnson was quoted as saying, "I train so that I can play every day. I don't train to be a fourth outfielder, or there would be a lot less training. I wouldn't be waking up as early. I wouldn't be trying to be in the shape that I'm in. I know my body can take the pounding of an everyday season".

In 2006, Johnson led all leadoff hitters in the American League with a .390 on-base percentage and also had a .319 batting average.

One of Johnson's more dubious honors is his propensity for being hit by pitches. Consistently among the Blue Jays leaders in being hit, in 2006 Johnson moved past Ed Sprague to take second on the Blue Jays all-time hit by pitch list, trailing only Carlos Delgado. He is also one of several players to be hit a major-league record three times in one game; Johnson was hit three times in a game against the Texas Rangers on April 15, 2005. He equaled this feat again on April 7, 2006, against the Tampa Bay Devil Rays and then again on April 29, 2006 against the New York Yankees, making Johnson the only player in history to be hit by a pitch three times in one game, three times in his career.

In 2008, the Blue Jays acquired veteran Matt Stairs, again relegating Johnson to a platoon role. The Blue Jays signed all-star shortstop David Eckstein, and removed Johnson from his familiar role as leadoff hitter. The Blue Jays also signed outfielder Shannon Stewart to a minor league contract. Stewart, who played in 855 games for Toronto from 1995 to 2003, was a dependable and consistent force at the top of the Blue Jays lineup for many years, although by this point he was considered a liability in the field at times because of an injury suffered playing football, which greatly reduced his throwing strength. His presence at spring training made Johnson's role all the more uncertain. Johnson was released by the Jays on March 23, and replaced by Stewart.

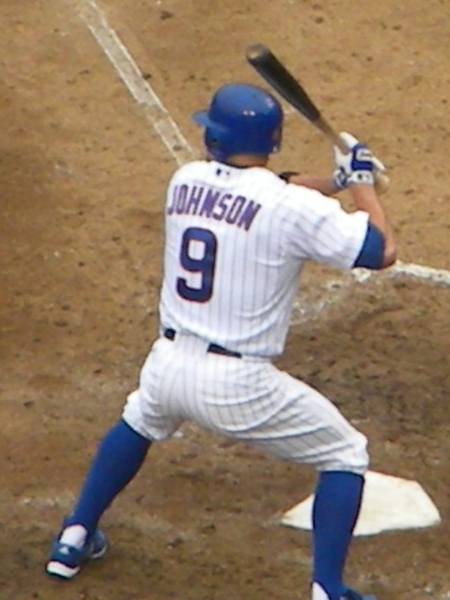
Johnson with the Chicago Cubs in 2009.

=== Chicago Cubs ===
On March 25, he signed a one-year deal with the Chicago Cubs. Johnson platooned in center field with Jim Edmonds (as well as Félix Pie to start the season). Johnson "batted in" a game-winning run after he was hit by a pitch with the bases loaded on June 12, against the Atlanta Braves. During a crucial game in the 2008 season against the Milwaukee Brewers, Johnson executed a perfect hard slide into second base that prevented a double play, and allowed the Cubs to take a one-run lead. When Johnson returned to Rogers Centre to play the Toronto Blue Jays on June 13, 2008, he received a long standing ovation from Blue Jays fans.

During a game early in the 2009 season, also against the Brewers, Johnson showed versatility on the field by catching a Prince Fielder drive that had cleared the wall, preventing the Brewers from tying the game on a grand slam. He was placed on the 15-day DL on July 30 that same year with a left foot fracture.

=== Los Angeles Dodgers ===
On February 1, 2010, Johnson signed a one-year deal with the Los Angeles Dodgers to replace Juan Pierre as the team's fourth outfielder. He appeared in 102 games with a .262 batting average during the season.

Johnson appears in the opening introduction sequence of The Tonight Show with Jay Leno as a Dodger player. As the announcer introduces The Tonight Show, game footage of Johnson hitting a ball and running to first base is seen in the opening sequence; the exact game is not known. The shot of Johnson does not last more than two and a half seconds.

=== Chicago Cubs (second stint) ===
On January 12, 2011, Johnson signed a minor league contract to return to the Cubs organization that included an invitation to spring training.

On April 20, Johnson hit a walk-off homer into the left-field seats off Luke Gregerson to defeat the San Diego Padres 2-1 in the first game of a doubleheader. In 2011, he batted .309 in 246 at-bats. Through 2011, he had the second-best career fielding percentage (.991) among all active major league left fielders, behind Ryan Braun.

On December 21, 2011, Johnson re-signed with the Cubs on a one-year deal.

=== Atlanta Braves ===
On July 30, 2012, Johnson was traded along with left-handed pitcher Paul Maholm to the Atlanta Braves for right-handed pitchers Arodys Vizcaíno and Jaye Chapman.

On December 7, 2012, Johnson re-signed with the Atlanta Braves to a 1-year contract.

=== Miami Marlins ===
On January 31, 2014, Johnson signed a minor league contract with the Miami Marlins. On March 30, the Marlins selected Johnson's contract, adding him to their Opening Day roster. He batted .235/.266/.348 with two home runs and 35 RBI in 113 games with the team.

On February 17, 2015, the Marlins re-signed Johnson to another minor league contract. He was released on March 30.

=== Washington Nationals ===
Hours after being released by Miami, Johnson agreed to a minor league contract with the Washington Nationals. He appeared in 17 games for the Nationals in 2015 and hit .227. They re-signed him to a minor league contract after the season. He was released on April 3, 2016.

== Personal life ==
Growing up, Johnson participated in gymnastics. He resides in Temecula, California.
