= Paul Maholm =

American baseball player (born 1982)

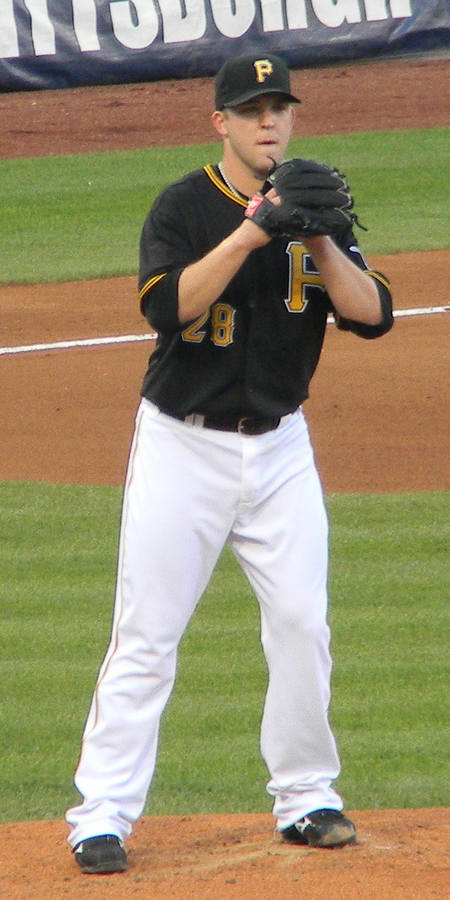
- Maholm with the Pittsburgh Pirates in 2010
- Pitcher
- Born: June 25, 1982 (age 44); Greenwood, Mississippi, U.S.
- Batted: Left Threw: Left

MLB debut
- August 30, 2005, for the Pittsburgh Pirates

Last MLB appearance
- August 1, 2014, for the Los Angeles Dodgers

MLB statistics
- Win–loss record: 77–100
- Earned run average: 4.30
- Strikeouts: 984
- Stats at Baseball Reference

Teams
- Pittsburgh Pirates (2005–2011); Chicago Cubs (2012); Atlanta Braves (2012–2013); Los Angeles Dodgers (2014)

Paul Gurner Maholm (/məˈhɒləm/ born June 25, 1982) is an American former professional baseball pitcher. He played in Major League Baseball (MLB) for the Pittsburgh Pirates, Chicago Cubs, Atlanta Braves and Los Angeles Dodgers.

== Early life ==
Paul Gurner Maholm was born on June 25, 1982, in Holly Springs, Mississippi. He played golf at the Holly Springs Country Club as a teenager.

Maholm graduated from Germantown High School in Germantown, Tennessee. He was a three-year letterman while pitching at Mississippi State University for the Bulldogs.

== Professional career ==
=== Pittsburgh Pirates ===
Maholm was selected by the Pittsburgh Pirates in the first round (eighth overall) of the 2003 draft.

While playing in the minor leagues in 2004, Maholm was struck in the face by a line drive. This resulted in a badly broken nose and a shattered left orbital, requiring surgery to repair the damage.

Maholm made his major league debut as a starter, on August 30, 2005, against the Milwaukee Brewers and pitched eight shutout innings, earning his first career win. Maholm compiled a 3–1 record in six games with a 2.18 ERA in the 2005 season.

In 2006, Maholm made 30 starts for the Pirates, going 8–10 with a 4.76 ERA in 176 innings. He struck out 117 while walking a career high 81 and hitting 12 batters.

Maholm pitched his first shutout, while giving up three hits in a 3–0 victory over the Houston Astros on April 24, 2007. The rest of his season went sour, finishing 10–15 in 29 starts. He minimized his walk total from the previous year, inducing just 49 walks in 177.2 innings.

The 2008 season proved to be one of Maholm's best as a starting pitcher. Despite not reaching double digit wins in 31 starts (9–9), he lowered his ERA by more than a run from the previous year, finishing with a 3.79 ERA in a career-high 206.1 innings. In a spring training game against the Yankees that year, he faced Billy Crystal in the comedian's lone at-bat. Crystal fouled off the second pitch down the first-base line, but ultimately struck out.

After the 2008 season, Maholm signed a three-year contract extension worth a guaranteed $14.5 million, with a team option for 2012.

In 2009, Maholm hit his first major league home run, off the Mets' John Maine. He finished 2009 with a record of 8–9, 4.44 ERA, 14 home runs allowed, six hit batsmen, 60 walks, 119 strikeouts, .290 average against, a 1.44 walks and hits per innings pitched, in 194.2 innings pitched.

Maholm reverted to his 2007 performance in 2010, finishing with a record of 9–15 with a career high 5.10 ERA.

In 2011, Maholm had a stint on the DL, missing more than three starts on the season. He finished 6–14 despite having an ERA of 3.66 and allowing just 11 home runs. He became a free agent following the season.

=== Chicago Cubs ===
On January 10, 2012, Maholm signed a one-year, $4.75 million contract with the Chicago Cubs with an option for a second year. He was 9–6 with a 3.74 ERA in 20 starts.

=== Atlanta Braves ===
On July 30, 2012, Maholm was traded to the Atlanta Braves with Reed Johnson for Arodys Vizcaino and Jaye Chapman. He was 14–16 with a 4.14 ERA over 1 1/2 seasons. He became a free agent following the 2013 season.

=== Los Angeles Dodgers ===
On February 8, 2014, Maholm signed a one-year, $1.5 million contract with the Los Angeles Dodgers. He started eight games for the Dodgers because of various injuries but spent most of his time in the bullpen as a long reliever. In 30 games, Maholm had a 4.84 ERA and a 1–5 record. In a game on August 1 against the Chicago Cubs, he tore his anterior cruciate ligament in his right knee and was lost for the season. He became a free agent following the season.

=== Cincinnati Reds ===
On February 1, 2015, Maholm signed a minor league deal with the Cincinnati Reds. Though he hoped to make the Reds as a starting pitcher, he wound up competing for a position in the bullpen. He was released on March 30.

== Pitching style ==
Maholm threw a wide variety of pitches and with a great range of speeds. His lead pitch was a sinker in the 87–89 mph range. Maholm also throws a four-seam fastball (87–90), changeup (80–83), cut fastball (83–86), slider (79–82), and curveball (70–75). He used the cutter and changeup almost exclusively on right-handed hitters, while the slider was used only on lefties. Maholm threw his curveball to batters from both sides of the plate. In 2013, he added a slow curveball that ranges from 62 to 70 MPH, that at times dips into the fifties.
