= Lendy Castillo =

Dominican baseball pitcher (born 1989)

- Pitcher
- Born: April 8, 1989 (age 37); Las Matas de Santa Cruz, Monte Cristi, Dominican Republic
- Batted: Switch Threw: Right

MLB debut
- April 9, 2012, for the Chicago Cubs

Last MLB appearance
- September 29, 2012, for the Chicago Cubs

MLB statistics (through 2012 season)
- Win–loss record: 0–1
- Earned run average: 7.88
- Strikeouts: 13
- Stats at Baseball Reference

Teams
- Chicago Cubs (2012)

Lendy Enrique Castillo Artiles (born April 8, 1989) is a Dominican former professional baseball pitcher. He has previously played for the Chicago Cubs of Major League Baseball (MLB).

== Career ==
=== Philadelphia Phillies ===
Castillo signed with the Philadelphia Phillies as an international free agent. He debuted in the Phillies' minor league organization in 2007 as a shortstop. The Phillies converted Castillo into a pitcher in 2010, and he pitched for the Phillies' organization in 2010 and 2011. He was used primarily as a starting pitcher in 2010 and as a relief pitcher in 2011.

=== Chicago Cubs ===
The Cubs selected Castillo from the Phillies organization in the 2011 Rule 5 draft. Castillo made the Cubs' Opening Day roster. Castillo was designated for assignment on January 26, 2013, to make room for Carlos Villanueva. He cleared waivers and was outrighted to the Triple-A Iowa Cubs. Castillo began the 2013 season with the Class-A Kane County Cougars.

=== Toronto Blue Jays ===
On August 18, 2015, Castillo signed a minor league contract with the Toronto Blue Jays. He elected free agency on November 6, 2015.

=== Rangers/BlueJays ===
During the 2015 season, Castillo pitched in the Texas and Toronto organizations, seeing time with Class-A High Desert Mavericks, Class-A Dunedin Blue Jays and Double-A Frisco RoughRiders. In 27 games, including one start, between the three teams, Castillo posted a 2–2 record with a 4.78 ERA and 39 strikeouts.

=== Detroit Tigers ===
On December 11, 2015, Castillo signed a minor-league contract with the Detroit Tigers, and was invited to spring training. He was released on July 23, 2016.

=== Cleveland Indians ===
Castillo signed a minor league contract with the Cleveland Indians on August 1, 2016, but was released on August 12.

=== New Jersey Jackals ===
On March 14, 2018, Castillo signed with the New Jersey Jackals of the Can-Am League.

=== Generales de Durango ===
He left the team on June 8, 2018, to sign with the Generales de Durango of the Mexican Baseball League. He was released on July 14, 2018.

=== New Jersey Jackals (second stint) ===
On February 16, 2019, Castillo signed with the New Jersey Jackals of the Can-Am League. He became a free agent following the season.
