= Scott Maine =

American baseball player (born 1985)

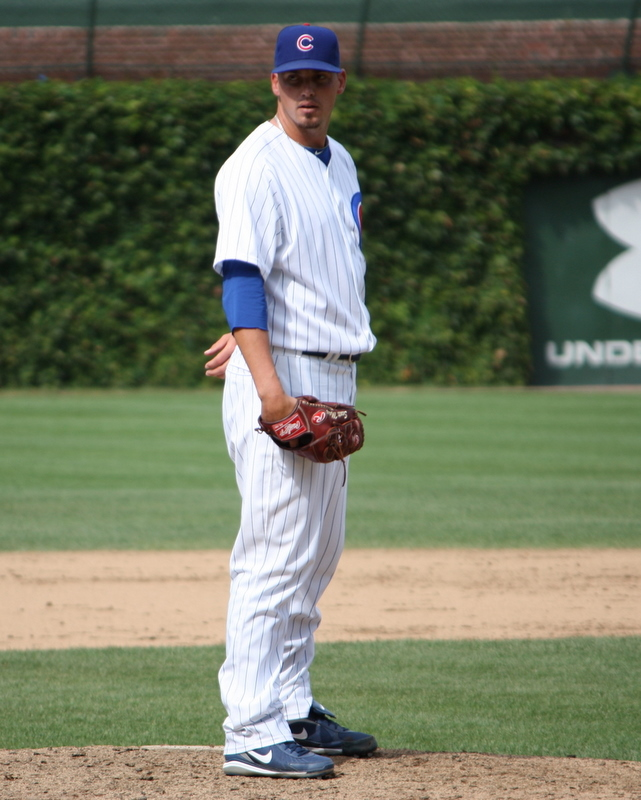
- Maine with the Chicago Cubs
- Pitcher
- Born: February 2, 1985 (age 41); Palm Beach Gardens, Florida, U.S.
- Batted: Left Threw: Left

MLB debut
- August 27, 2010, for the Chicago Cubs

Last MLB appearance
- October 1, 2012, for the Cleveland Indians

MLB statistics
- Win–loss record: 2–3
- Earned run average: 5.59
- Strikeouts: 48
- Stats at Baseball Reference

Teams
- Chicago Cubs (2010–2012); Cleveland Indians (2012)

Scott Maine (born February 2, 1985) is an American former professional baseball relief pitcher. He played in Major League Baseball (MLB) with the Chicago Cubs and Cleveland Indians from 2010 to 2012.

== Early years ==
Maine was born and raised in Palm Beach Gardens, Florida, where he attended William T. Dwyer High School. He then attended the University of Miami and played college baseball for the Miami Hurricanes. In 2006, he played for the Brewster Whitecaps of the Cape Cod League and was named a league all-star.

== Career ==
Maine was drafted by the Seattle Mariners in the 15th round of the 2003 MLB draft out of high school, but did not sign. He was also drafted by the Colorado Rockies in the 23rd round of the 2006 MLB draft as a junior, but did not sign.

=== Arizona Diamondbacks ===
Maine was drafted by the Arizona Diamondbacks in the sixth round (193rd overall) of the 2007 Major League Baseball draft, and signed. Maine played in eight games for the Low-A Yakima Bears in 2007, going 1-0 with a 6.10 ERA and one save, striking out 20 in 10 1/3 innings. Maine played 2008 with the High-A Visalia Oaks, where in 32 games, he went 3-2 with a 3.19 ERA and five saves, striking out 53 in 48 innings. Maine played the 2009 season with the Double-A Mobile BayBears until he was promoted to the Triple-A Reno Aces for the last month of the minor league season. In 48 total games, he went 4-5 with a 2.90 ERA and 7 saves, striking out 61 in 62 innings.

=== Chicago Cubs ===
Following the 2009 season, Maine was traded by the Diamondbacks with Ryne White to the Chicago Cubs in exchange for Aaron Heilman. He also played for the Scottsdale Scorpions of the Arizona Fall League.

Maine was added to the Cubs' roster on August 27, 2010, and made his MLB debut the same day. He split 2010, 2011 and 2012 with the Chicago and Iowa. In 3 seasons with the big-league Cubs, Maine had a 4.87 ERA in 41 games while striking out 42 in 40 2/3 innings.

=== Cleveland Indians ===
Maine was claimed off waivers by the Cleveland Indians on August 29, 2012, and made his debut with the team on September 8. In nine games with the Indians, Maine had a 10.50 ERA while striking out six in six innings.

=== Toronto Blue Jays ===
The Toronto Blue Jays claimed Maine off waivers from the Indians on October 31, 2012. 8 days later, Maine was designated for assignment to make room for the recently acquired Jeremy Jeffress.

=== Miami Marlins ===
On November 14, 2012, Maine was claimed off waivers by the Miami Marlins. He began the year with the Triple-A New Orleans Zephyrs, but was released on July 20 after throwing 20 games in the Marlins organization, nine of them on a rehab assignment with the Gulf Coast League Marlins. In those 20 games, he had a 4.19 ERA with three saves, striking out 26 in 19 1/3 innings.

=== Bridgeport Bluefish ===
On March 18, 2014, Maine signed with the Bridgeport Bluefish of the Atlantic League of Professional Baseball.

=== Cincinnati Reds ===
On June 30, 2014 Maine signed a minor league deal contract the Cincinnati Reds. He was released by the Reds organization on August 7.

=== Vaqueros Laguna ===
Maine signed with Vaqueros Laguna prior to the 2015 season. He was released early in the season on April 2, 2015.

=== Bridgeport Bluefish (second stint) ===
Maine re-signed with the Bridgeport Bluefish. This was his second stint with the Bluefish after playing for them during the 2014 season. He was released from the Bluefish in July.

=== Southern Maryland Blue Crabs ===
On March 31, 2016, Maine signed with the Southern Maryland Blue Crabs of the Atlantic League of Professional Baseball. He became a free agent after the 2016 season.

=== Sugar Land Skeeters ===
On May 30, 2017, Maine signed with the Sugar Land Skeeters of the Atlantic League of Professional Baseball. He became a free agent after the 2017 season.

=== Ottawa Champions ===
On March 9, 2018, Maine signed with the Ottawa Champions of the Can-Am League. He was released following the season on December 13.
