= James Russell (baseball) =

American baseball player (born 1986)

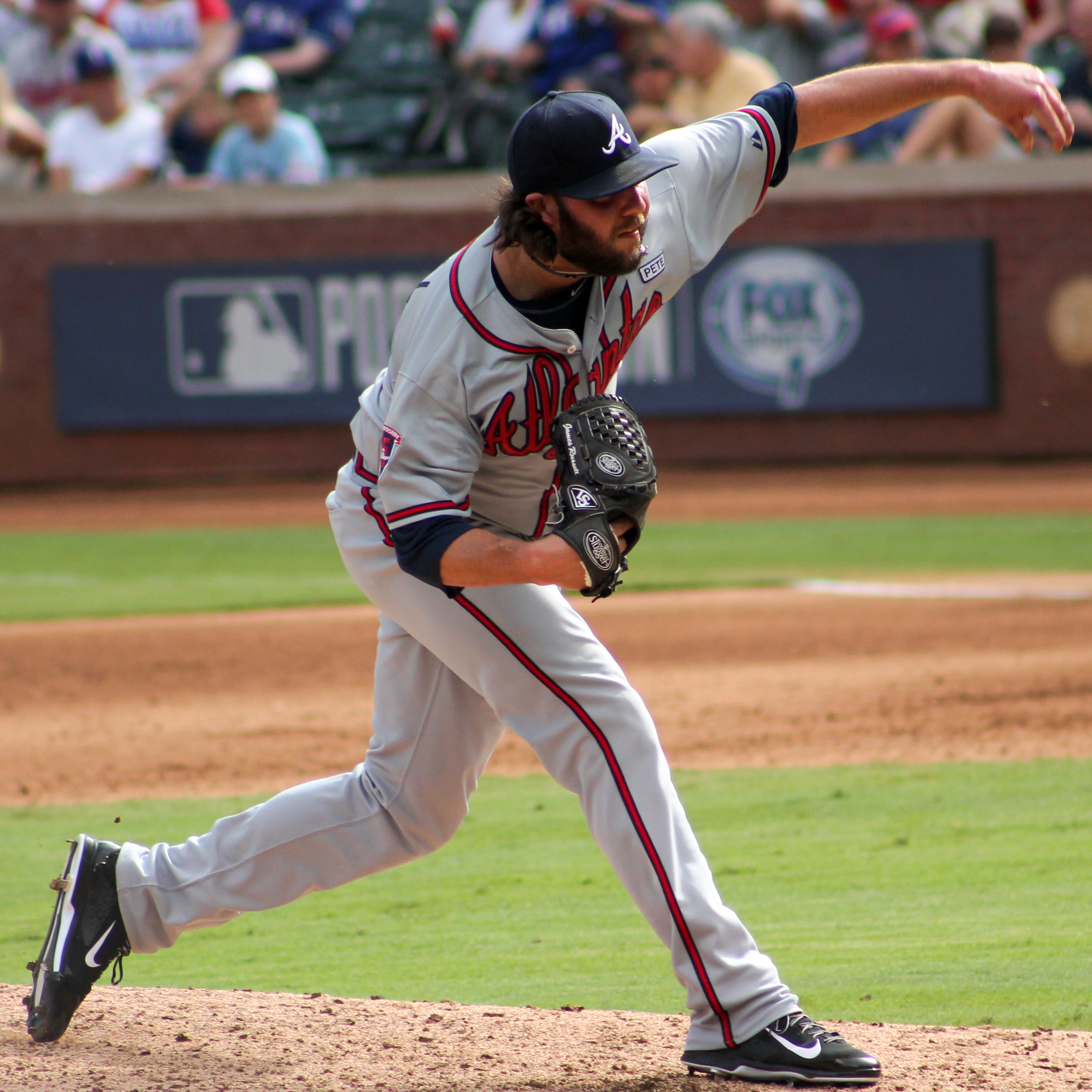
- Russell with the Atlanta Braves in 2014
- Relief pitcher
- Born: January 8, 1986 (age 40); Cincinnati, Ohio, U.S.
- Batted: Left Threw: Left

MLB debut
- April 15, 2010, for the Chicago Cubs

Last MLB appearance
- April 19, 2016, for the Philadelphia Phillies

MLB statistics
- Win–loss record: 10–18
- Earned run average: 4.09
- Strikeouts: 243
- Stats at Baseball Reference

Teams
- Chicago Cubs (2010–2014); Atlanta Braves (2014); Chicago Cubs (2015); Philadelphia Phillies (2016)

James Clayton Russell (born January 8, 1986) is an American former professional baseball pitcher. He played college baseball at Navarro College and the University of Texas and was drafted by the Chicago Cubs in the 14th round of the 2007 Major League Baseball draft. Russell made his Major League Baseball (MLB) debut on April 5, 2010 and also played in MLB for the Atlanta Braves and Philadelphia Phillies.

== High school career ==
Russell attended Colleyville Heritage High School, where he was a member of the school's baseball team. After his senior year, he was drafted by the Seattle Mariners in the 37th round of the 2004 Major League Baseball draft but did not sign. Instead, he chose to attend Navarro College.

== College career ==
Russell was drafted again by the Seattle Mariners in the 17th round of the 2005 Major League Baseball draft, but he did not sign.

Russell then attended the University of Texas, where he was a starting pitcher for the Texas Longhorns baseball team for one season after transferring from Navarro College. In his only season pitching for the Longhorns, Russell was named to the second team All-Big 12, while posting an 8–4 win–loss record and a 3.86 earned run average (ERA).

== Professional career ==
=== Chicago Cubs ===
Russell was drafted by the Chicago Cubs in the 14th round, with the 427th overall selection, of the 2007 Major League Baseball draft. On August 9, Russell signed with the Cubs for $350,000.

After signing, Russell was assigned to the rookie-level Arizona League Cubs. However, after just one start in which he only threw two innings, he was called up to the Single-A Peoria Chiefs. He pitched in two games for the Chiefs, striking out nine batters and allowing just three hits in seven innings. With Peoria, Russell combined to throw a no-hitter on August 25, 2007.

To start 2008, Russell joined the High-A Daytona Cubs. On April 26, he earned his first win of the season against the Jupiter Hammerheads. Three days later, he was called up to the Double-A Tennessee Smokies. He would pitch most of the season with the Smokies before being sent back down to the Cubs for the playoffs. Combined, Russell went 6–8 with a 5.44 ERA and a 1.453 WHIP in 25 starts made.

Russell began the 2009 season with Tennessee. He eventually converted to being a relief pitcher for the Smokies, instead of being a starter. After pitching 11 games for the Smokies, Russell was called up to the Triple-A Iowa Cubs. With Iowa, he was mainly a reliever, but also made seven starts for the Cubs. Between Tennessee and Iowa, Russell went 5–6 with a 4.03 ERA and a 1.403 WHIP in 37 games, including 12 starts. Following the season, he joined the Mesa Solar Sox, a team in the Arizona Fall League, which largely features players considered top prospects.

In 2010, Russell made the Cubs Opening Day roster after giving up no runs in 11 innings of work during spring training and debuted on opening day, April 5, with two scoreless innings against the Atlanta Braves. He became the 97th former Texas Longhorn to make his major league debut.

In 2010, Russell also helped extend Texas' streak of having a former player debut in the major leagues from eight consecutive seasons to nine. He made 20 appearances for the Cubs, going 0–1 with a 4.20 ERA before being optioned to Triple-A Iowa on June 12. However, after making just five appearances for Iowa, Russell was recalled by the Cubs on June 29, after Carlos Zambrano was placed on the restricted list and John Grabow went on the disabled list. He finished the season with a 1–1 record, a 4.96 ERA, and a 1.347 WHIP in 57 appearances for the Cubs. Following the season, the Chicago Tribune stated that the inclusion of Russell and three other inexperienced relievers in the Cubs' bullpen was one of the team's 10 biggest mistakes of the season.

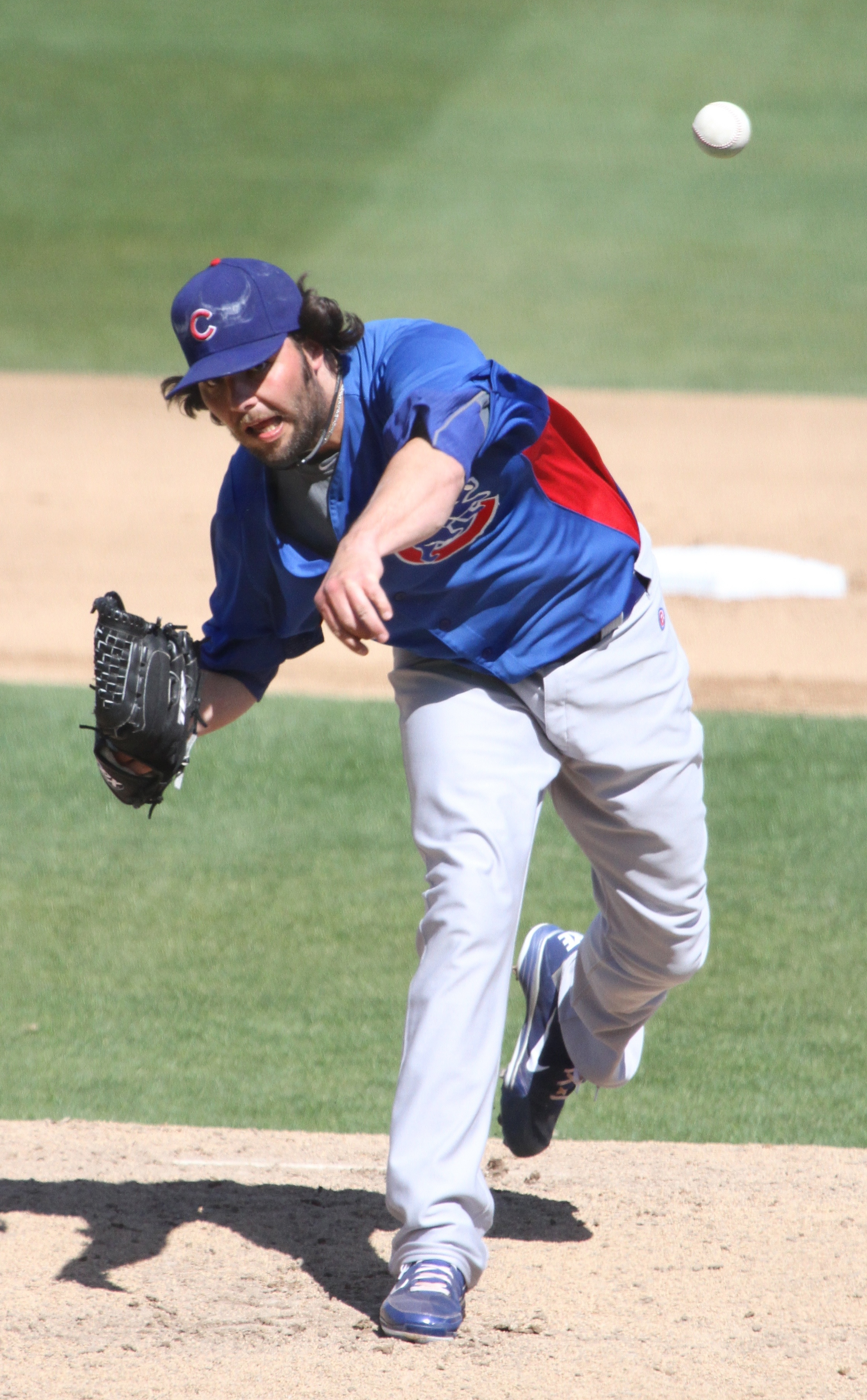
Russell with the Chicago Cubs (2012)

In 2011, Russell made 64 appearances with a 1–6 record, a 4.12 ERA, 43 strikeouts, and 1.33 WHIP. He improved in 2012, recording a 7–1 record, 3.25 ERA, 55 strikeouts, and 1.298 WHIP in 77 games. Russell ended 2013 having pitched in 74 games with a 1–6 record, a 3.59 ERA, 37 strikeouts, and 1.215 WHIP.

=== Atlanta Braves ===
On July 31, 2014, Russell and Emilio Bonifacio were traded to the Atlanta Braves in exchange for Víctor Caratini. In 22 appearances for Atlanta, he posted a 2.22 ERA with 16 strikeouts across 24 1/3 innings pitched. Russell was released by the Braves on March 29, 2015.

=== Chicago Cubs (second stint) ===
On April 8, 2015, Russell signed a minor league contract with the Chicago Cubs. He had his contract selected to the major league roster on May 5. He went 0–2 with a 5.29 ERA for the Cubs before being designated for assignment on September 1, he cleared waivers and was sent outright to Triple-A Iowa Cubs on September 3. He elected free agency following the season on October 6.

=== Philadelphia Phillies ===
On November 12, 2015, Russell signed a minor league contract with the Philadelphia Phillies. On April 2, 2016, the Phillies selected Russell's contract after he made the team's Opening Day roster. In 7 appearances for Philadelphia, he struggled to an 18.69 ERA with 4 strikeouts across 4 1/3 innings pitched. Russell was designated for assignment by the Phillies on April 20. He cleared waivers and was sent outright to the Triple-A Lehigh Valley IronPigs on April 22. Russell elected free agency following the season on October 3.

=== Texas AirHogs ===
On February 15, 2017, Russell signed a minor league contract with the Cleveland Indians that included an invitation to spring training. He was released prior to the start of the season on March 31.

On April 25, 2017, Russell signed with the Texas AirHogs of the American Association of Professional Baseball. In 9 starts for the AirHogs, Russell compiled a 3-1 record and 2.79 ERA with 46 strikeouts across 58 innings pitched.

=== Leones de Yucatán ===
On July 7, 2017, Russell signed with the Leones de Yucatán of the Mexican League. In 5 starts for Yucatán, he recorded a 2.03 ERA with 27 strikeouts over 31 innings of work. Russell was released by the Leones on January 9, 2018.

=== Detroit Tigers ===
On January 24, 2018, Russell signed a minor league contract with the Detroit Tigers. In 2 appearances for the Triple-A Toledo Mud Hens, he struggled to an 0-1 record and 15.00 ERA with 2 strikeouts over 3 innings of work. Russell was released by the Tigers organization on May 8.

=== Sugar Land Skeeters ===
On May 29, 2018, Russell signed with the Sugar Land Skeeters of the Atlantic League of Professional Baseball. In 20 appearances (18 starts) for Sugar Land, he logged an 8-4 record and 2.36 ERA with 98 strikeouts across 106 2/3 innings pitched. Russell and the Skeeters won the Atlantic League Championship and he was named the Skeeters Pitcher of the Year. He became a free agent following the season.

=== Toros de Tijuana ===
On April 3, 2019, Russell signed with the Toros de Tijuana of the Mexican League. In 19 games (18 starts) for Tijuana, he compiled an 8-4 record and 3.26 ERA with 66 strikeouts across 88 1/3 innings pitched. Russell did not play in a game in 2020 due to the cancellation of the Mexican League season because of the COVID-19 pandemic.

=== Algodoneros de Unión Laguna ===
On March 23, 2021, Russell was traded to the Algodoneros de Unión Laguna of the Mexican League. In 7 starts for the Algodoneros, he posted a 2-2 record and 3.67 ERA with 23 strikeouts across 34 1/3 innings pitched. Russell was released on December 14.

On March 24, 2022, Russell joined TPA Baseball Texas as an instructor.

== Pitching style ==
Unlike most pitchers who throw a fastball of some sort as their most common pitch, Russell's most common was a slider at 79–83 miles per hour (mph). He also featured four-seam and two-seam fastballs (89–90 mph), a cutter (86–88 mph), a curveball (72–75 mph), and a changeup (80–83 mph). Left-handers saw almost all four-seamers and sliders (and no change-ups), while right-handers saw a larger variety of pitches.

== Personal life ==
Russell's father is former MLB pitcher Jeff Russell.

Russell's brother-in-law is Kansas City Royals shortstop and fellow Colleyville native Bobby Witt Jr. Russell is married to Witt's older sister Nikki.

== See also ==
- List of second-generation Major League Baseball players
