= Steve Clevenger =

American baseball player (born 1986)

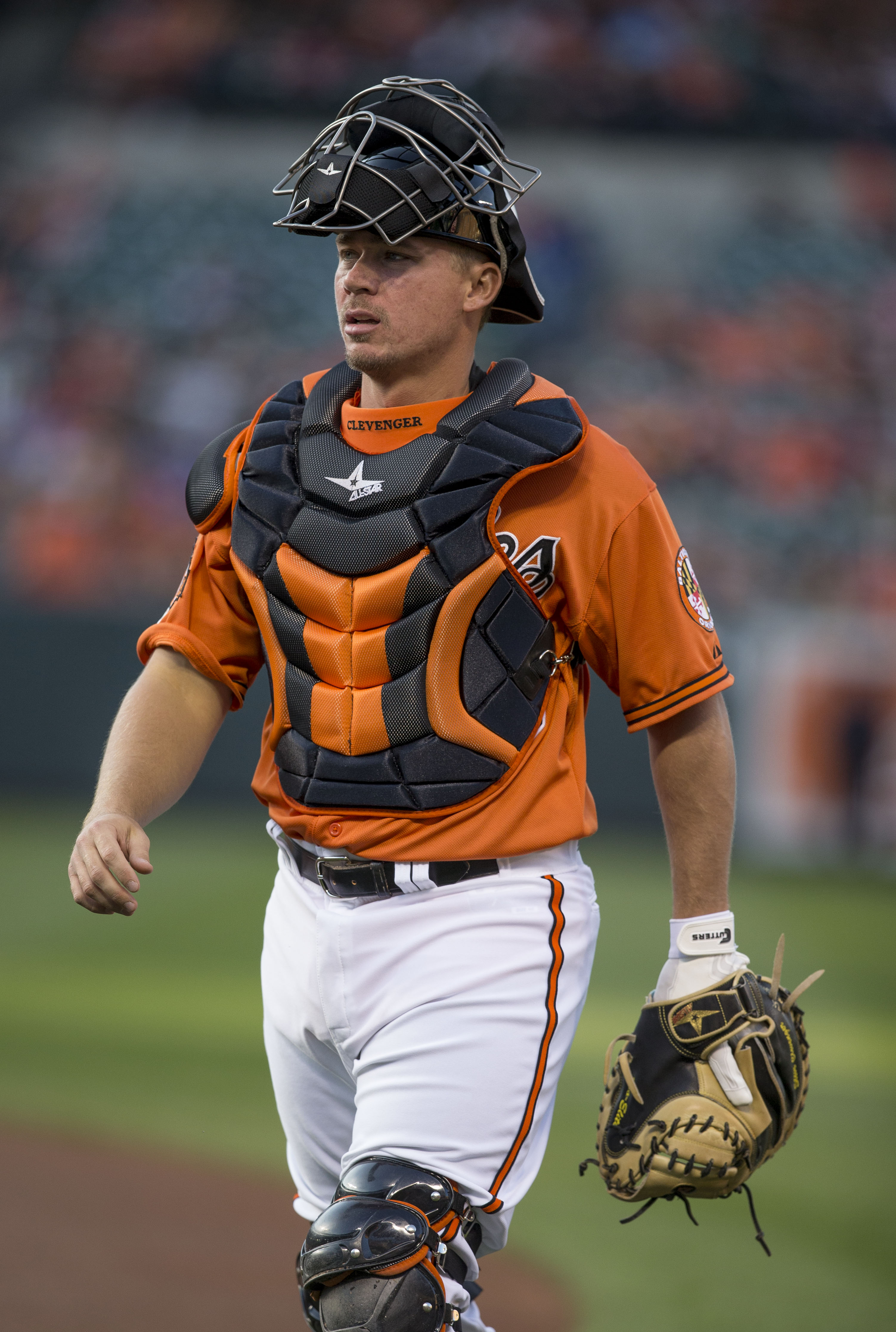
- Clevenger with the Baltimore Orioles in 2014
- Catcher
- Born: April 5, 1986 (age 40); Baltimore, Maryland, U.S.
- Bats: Left Throws: Right

MLB debut
- September 26, 2011, for the Chicago Cubs

MLB statistics
- Batting average: .227
- Home runs: 4
- Runs batted in: 48
- Stats at Baseball Reference

Teams
- Chicago Cubs (2011–2013); Baltimore Orioles (2013–2015); Seattle Mariners (2016)

Steven Scott Clevenger (born April 5, 1986) is an American former professional baseball catcher. He played in Major League Baseball (MLB) for the Chicago Cubs, Baltimore Orioles, and Seattle Mariners.

== Early life ==
Clevenger was raised in Glen Burnie, Maryland, attended Overlook Elementary and graduated from Mount Saint Joseph High School in 2004. He was the starting shortstop on the school's varsity baseball team which won the Maryland Interscholastic Athletic Association A conference championship in his senior year.

He hit .347 as a first-team All-Southland Conference shortstop in his only year at Southeastern Louisiana University in 2005. After transferring to Chipola College, he led the Indians with a .395 batting average and 77 hits.

== Professional career ==
=== Chicago Cubs ===
==== Minor leagues ====
Clevenger was selected by the Chicago Cubs in the seventh round (209th overall) of the 2006 Major League Baseball draft. After signing with the Cubs on June 14, he began his professional career as the starting second baseman with the Boise Hawks. Clevenger started making the transition to catcher the following season after Hawks manager Steve McFarland convinced him that a left-handed batter at the position had a better chance of a faster promotion to the majors.

During the 2011 season, Clevenger played for the Tennessee Smokies where he batted .295 and hit five home runs. He also played for the Triple-A Iowa Cubs where in 86 at-bats, he batted .407 and hit three home runs.

==== Major leagues ====
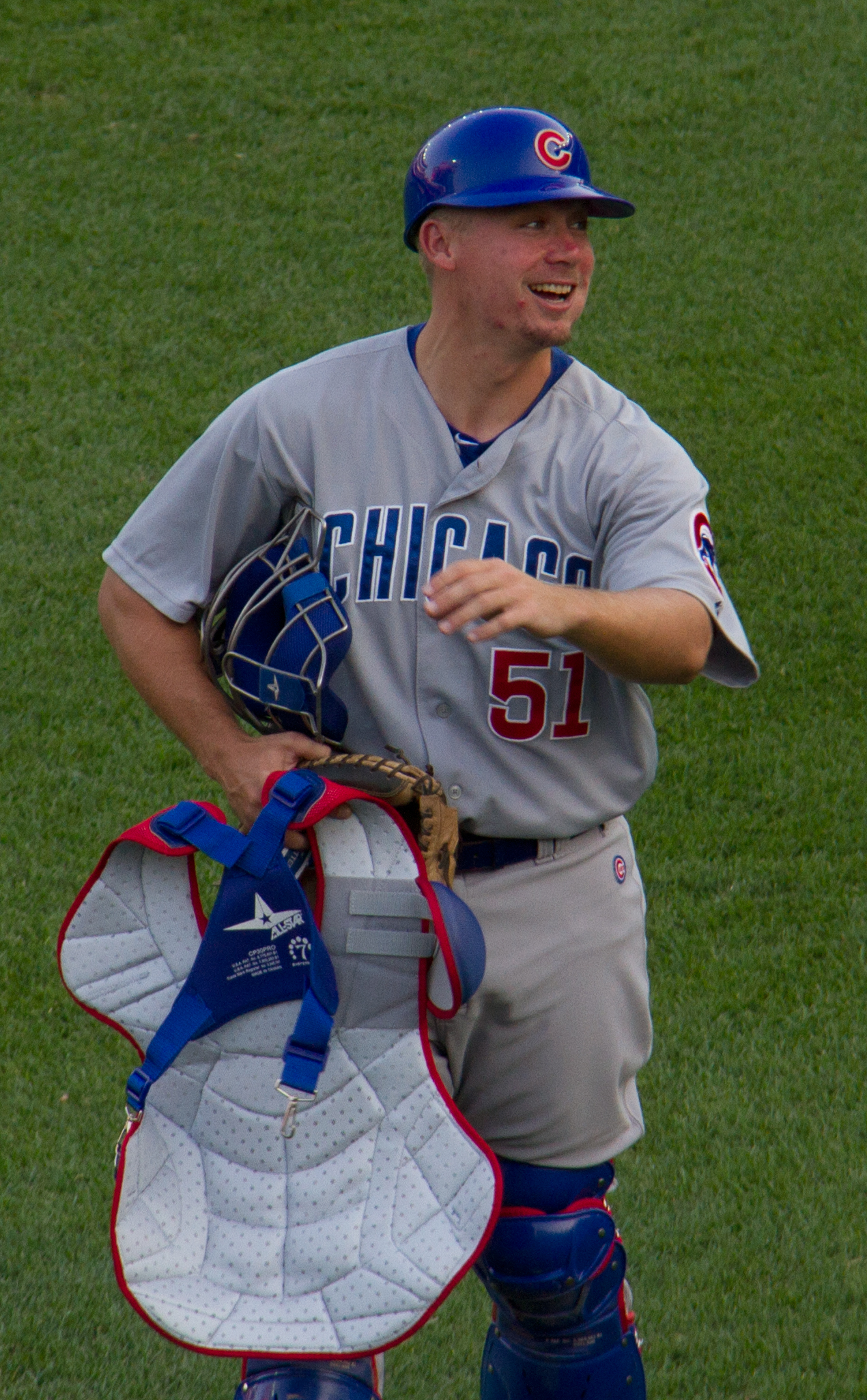
Clevenger during his tenure with the Chicago Cubs in 2012

Clevenger was called up to the Cubs from the expanded 40-man roster. He made his major league debut September 26, 2011, however he only played in two games during the 2011 season.

Clevenger made the opening day roster during the 2012 season. However, on April 28, Clevenger was placed on the 15-day disabled list with a strained right oblique. Clevenger finished the 2012 season with a .201 batting average, one home run, and 16 RBI.

=== Baltimore Orioles ===
On July 2, 2013, Clevenger was traded to the Baltimore Orioles with Scott Feldman for pitchers Jake Arrieta and Pedro Strop. Clevenger was optioned to the Triple-A Norfolk Tides after the trade. He was recalled on September 1, but did not play for the Orioles until September 13 against the Toronto Blue Jays. On August 17, 2015, he became the first Baltimore native to hit a home run for the Orioles at Camden Yards.

Clevenger batted .225/.289/.337 for the 2014 season. Showalter was dissatisfied with Clevenger's defense (he caught 3 of 20 attempted base-stealers), and the team had problems with his conditioning. Clevenger had one minor league option remaining after the 2014 season.

Clevenger was optioned to Triple-A Norfolk Tides on April 7, 2015, and on April 24, was placed on the DL with a left thumb contusion. He was recalled to Baltimore on May 26, and made his season debut two days later. He went 2-for-4 with an RBI in the game. Clevenger played in four games before being optioned back to Norfolk on June 5. Clevenger would end up making the International League All-Star team. After several roster moves by the Orioles, Clevenger was once again recalled by Baltimore on August 14. Two days later, he set a new career-high in hits, going 4-for-6 with a double and an RBI in an 18-2 rout over the Oakland Athletics. In 2015 he batted .287/.314/.426 in 101 at bats.

=== Seattle Mariners ===
On December 2, 2015, the Orioles traded Clevenger to the Seattle Mariners for Mark Trumbo and C. J. Riefenhauser. Clevenger had a poor 2016, appearing in only 20 games at catcher for the Mariners and batting .221/.303/.309 and catching 5 of 16 would-be base stealers before sustaining a broken hand on June 29 in a game against the Pittsburgh Pirates, an injury that proved season-ending. On November 2, Clevenger was outrighted to the minors. He elected free agency on November 4.

==== Suspension ====
On September 22, 2016, Clevenger tweeted that he thought it was ironic that black people were beating white people after a black man had been shot dead by a black policeman and that Black Lives Matter protestors as well as President Barack Obama and all Black Lives Matter supporters should be "locked behind bars like animals," prompting a response from Mariners general manager Jerry Dipoto disavowing those remarks. The next day, Dipoto announced that Clevenger was suspended without pay for the remainder of the season.

=== Lancaster Barnstormers ===
On July 21, 2017, Clevenger signed with the Lancaster Barnstormers of the Atlantic League of Professional Baseball. In 2017, he batted .293/.357/.366. He became a free agent after the season.
