= Brett Jackson =

American baseball player (born 1988)

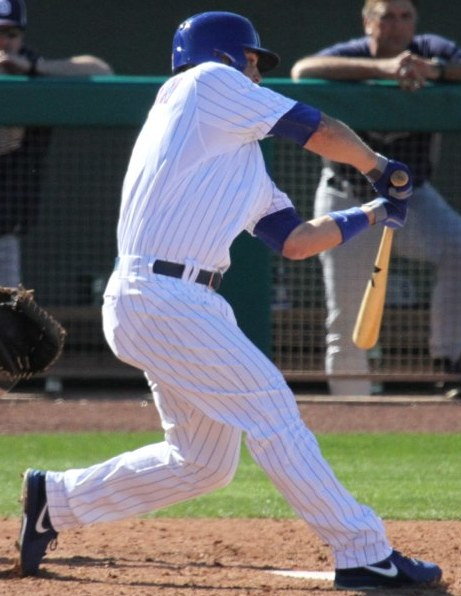
- Jackson with the Chicago Cubs in 2012
- Center fielder
- Born: August 2, 1988 (age 38); Berkeley, California, U.S.
- Batted: Left Threw: Right

MLB debut
- August 5, 2012, for the Chicago Cubs

Last MLB appearance
- September 26, 2014, for the Arizona Diamondbacks

MLB statistics
- Batting average: .169
- Home runs: 4
- Runs batted in: 9
- Stats at Baseball Reference

Teams
- Chicago Cubs (2012); Arizona Diamondbacks (2014)
Medals
Men's baseball
Representing United States
Pan American Games
Silver medal – second place	2011 Guadalajara	National team

Brett Elliott Jackson (born August 2, 1988) is an American former professional baseball center fielder who played in Major League Baseball (MLB) for the Chicago Cubs and Arizona Diamondbacks between 2012 and 2014. Jackson played college baseball at the University of California, Berkeley, and has also competed for the United States national baseball team.

== Career ==
=== Amateur career ===
Jackson attended Miramonte High School. He then enrolled at the University of California, Berkeley, where he played college baseball for the California Golden Bears baseball team in the Pacific-10 Conference of the National Collegiate Athletic Association's (NCAA) Division I. In the summer of 2008, Jackson played collegiate summer baseball for the Cotuit Kettleers of the Cape Cod Baseball League. Baseball America rated Jackson as the eighth best prospect in the league. As a junior in 2009, Jackson had a .321 batting average with eight home runs and 41 runs batted in for the Golden Bears.

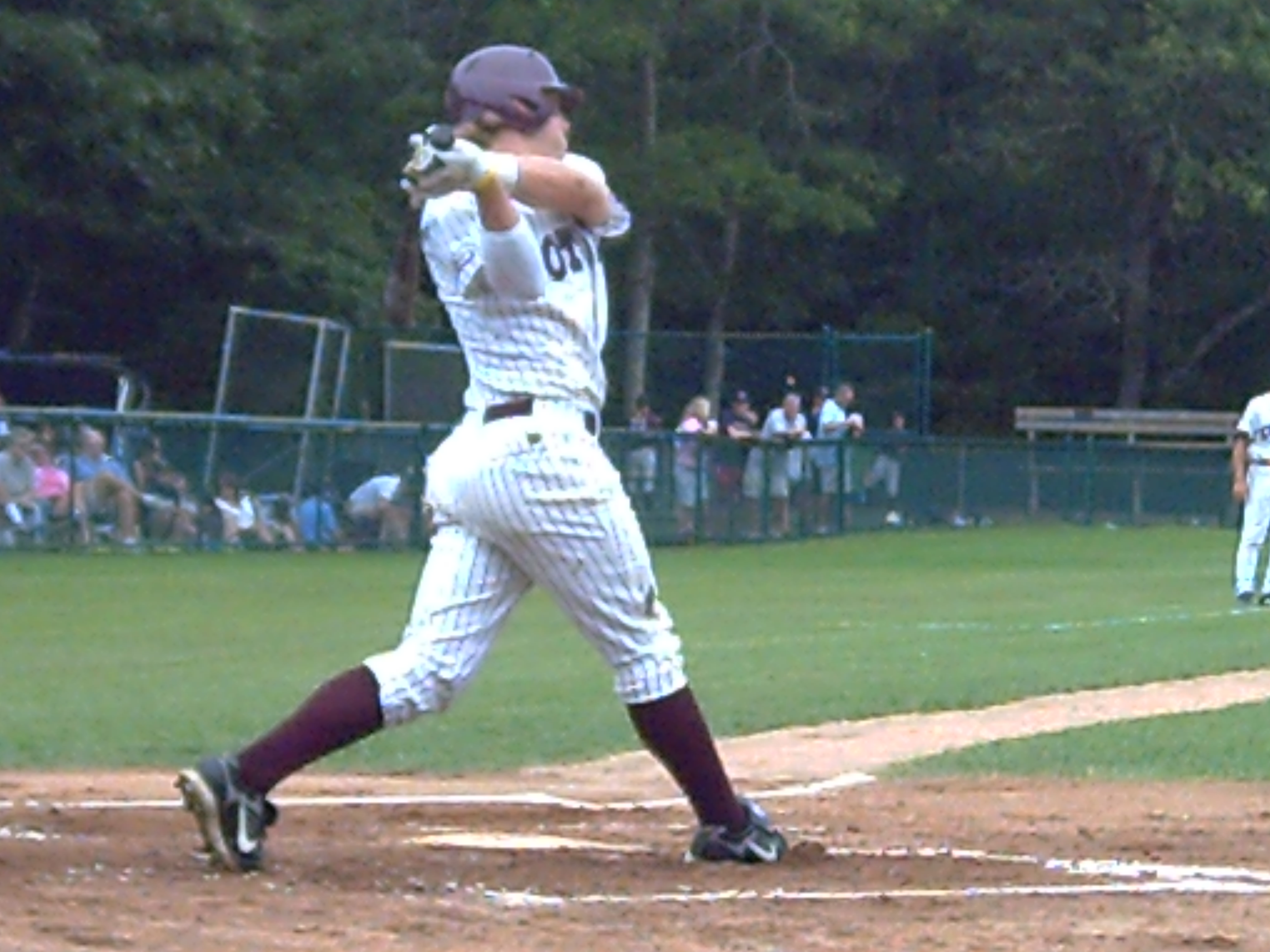
Jackson with the Cotuit Kettleers in 2008

=== Chicago Cubs ===
The Chicago Cubs selected Jackson in the first round of the 2009 MLB draft. Before the 2011 season, Jackson was considered the Cubs second best prospect according to Baseball America. He was also ranked as one of the top 50 overall prospects by MLB.com.

Heading into the 2009 MLB draft, Baseball America rated Jackson as the 34th best prospect available. The Chicago Cubs drafted Jackson in the first round (31st overall). He debuted professionally with the Arizona League Cubs of the Rookie-level Arizona League, receiving promotions to the Boise Hawks of the Class-A Short Season Northwest League and the Peoria Chiefs of the Class-A Midwest League. Before the 2010 season, Baseball America rated Jackson as the 74th best prospect in baseball. In 2010, Jackson played for the Daytona Cubs of the Class-A Advanced Florida State League, and participated in the 2010 All-Star Futures Game. Rated as the 38th best prospect in baseball by Baseball America before the 2011 season, Jackson started the year with the Tennessee Smokies of the Class-AA Southern League, before earning a promotion to the Iowa Cubs of the Class-AAA Pacific Coast League.

After the 2011 season, Jackson played for the United States national baseball team in the 2011 Baseball World Cup and the 2011 Pan American Games, winning the silver medal.

On August 5, 2012, Jackson was called up by the Cubs and made his MLB debut, batting second, as their starting center fielder. He batted .175 with 59 strikeouts in 120 at bats.

=== Arizona Diamondbacks ===
On August 14, 2014, the Cubs traded Jackson to the Arizona Diamondbacks in exchange for right-handed pitcher Blake Cooper. Jackson had been struggling with Iowa, batting .210 on the season. He played in seven games for the Diamondbacks, and was outrighted off the Diamondbacks roster on October 7, 2014.

=== San Francisco Giants ===
The San Francisco Giants selected Jackson from the Diamondbacks in the Class AAA phase of the 2014 Rule 5 draft. He was released on July 15, 2015.

== Personal life ==
Jackson's younger brother, Drew, is a professional baseball player. Jackson had an uncredited role in the TV series Pitch.

== See also ==
- Rule 5 draft results
