= Fernando Perez (baseball) =

American baseball player (born 1983)

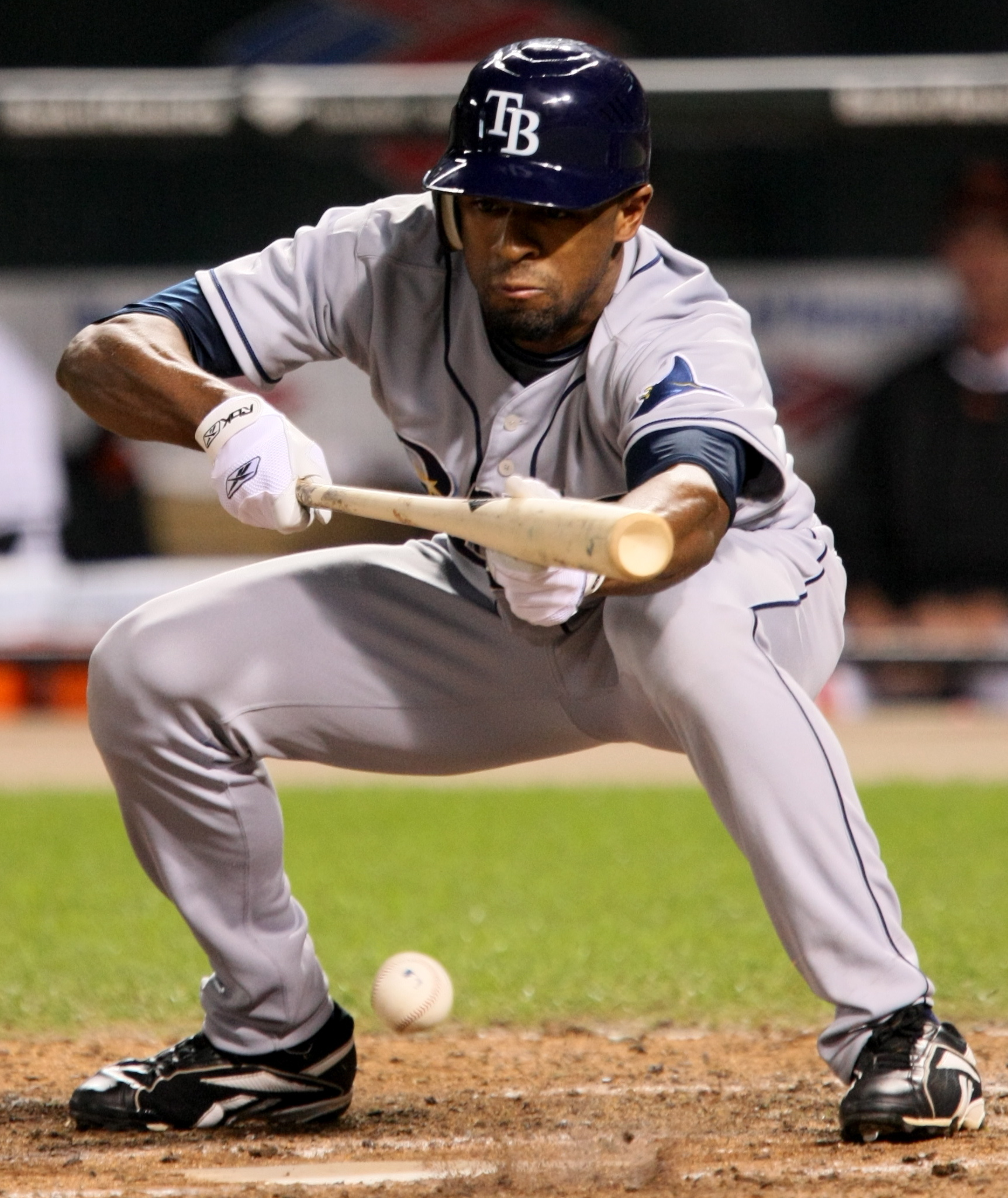
- Perez with the Tampa Bay Rays in 2008

Detroit Tigers
- Outfielder / Coach
- Born: April 23, 1983 (age 42); Elizabeth, New Jersey, U.S.
- Batted: Switch Threw: Right

MLB debut
- September 5, 2008, for the Tampa Bay Rays

Last MLB appearance
- October 4, 2009, for the Tampa Bay Rays

MLB statistics
- Batting average: .234
- Home runs: 3
- Runs batted in: 10
- Stats at Baseball Reference

Teams
- As player: Tampa Bay Rays (2008–2009); As coach: San Francisco Giants (2021–2024); Detroit Tigers (2025–present)

Fernando Perez (born April 23, 1983) is an American Major League Baseball (MLB) coach, former professional baseball outfielder, and a writer. He played baseball at Columbia University. He was selected by the Tampa Bay Devil Rays in the 7th round of the 2004 Major League Baseball draft. He played in MLB for the Rays in 2008 and 2009. In 2006, while playing for the Visalia Oaks, Perez led the minor leagues with 123 runs. He played professional baseball until retiring in 2014. In 2021, he became a video coordinator for the San Francisco Giants.

== Early life ==
Born in Elizabeth, New Jersey, to Cuban-born parents, Perez lived with his family in Brooklyn, New York, and eventually moved with his family to West Windsor, New Jersey, where he attended elementary and middle school and played little league. Perez played youth travel soccer for the Pirates and the West End Warriors of Mercer County, New Jersey, winners of several state cup championships during his tenure. Perez attended the Peddie School, a private high school in Hightstown, New Jersey, where batted .400 for the varsity baseball team.

== College ==
Perez attended Columbia University where he studied American Studies with an emphasis on creative writing, training he later used to become the first Major League Baseball player published in Poetry magazine. Perez is a fan of poets Robert Creeley and John Ashbery, as well as author Tom Miller.

He played baseball for Columbia for three years. In 2002, Perez batted .286/.315/.529 in 70 at bats with three steals without being caught, in 2003 he batted .305/.368/.437 in 151 at bats with 13 steals in 16 attempts, and in 2004 he batted .317/.370/.423 in 123 at bats with 18 steals in 19 attempts and was second team All-Ivy League. He was then selected by the Tampa Bay Devil Rays in the 7th round (195th overall) of the 2004 Major League Baseball draft and signed for a $165,000 signing bonus.

== Professional playing career ==
=== Tampa Bay Rays system ===
Perez played in 2004 for the Hudson Valley Renegades in the short-season New York–Penn League. In 2005 for the Southwest Michigan Devil Rays Single-A team, he batted .289/.361/.406 in 522 at bats while leading the league with 13 triples and 57 stolen bases (the third-most ever in a season for a Tampa Bay minor leaguer), with 93 runs (2nd in the league), and 58 walks (7th). He was named the Southwest Michigan Devil Rays Player of the Year.

In 2006 for the Visalia Oaks, Perez led the league with 123 runs (which also led the minor leagues, and set the Devil Rays' minor league record) and 9 triples. He batted .307/.398/.397 in 541 at bats with 33 stolen bases (4th in the league), 78 walks (2nd), and 8 sacrifice hits (5th). He was named the team MVP.

In 2007 for the Montgomery Biscuits, he batted .308(9th in the league)/.423(3rd)/.481 in 393 at bats, with 84 runs (2nd), 10 triples (2nd), 32 stolen bases (4th; a team record), 76 walks (3rd). Perez was named a Southern League Post-Season All-Star and a Baseball America Double-A All-Star.

Perez was playing for the Triple-A Durham Bulls in 2008 (for whom he batted .288/.361/.393 in 514 at bats with 86 runs (2nd in the league), 11 triples (2nd), 43 stolen bases (3rd), and 58 walks (8th)) when he was called up to the majors on August 31. From April 4-October 4, 2007, he wrote a journal for milb.com.

In his five season in the minors through 2008, Perez batted .289 with a .403 slugging percentage.

==== In the majors ====
Perez was called up by the Tampa Bay Rays on August 31, 2008. In his first major league at bat, on September 5, Perez recorded a single off Toronto Blue Jays closer B. J. Ryan. His first major league home run came in front of his hometown fans on September 14, at Yankee Stadium. In 60 at bats, he batted .250/.348/.433 with five steals in five attempts.

He contributed to the Rays reaching their first World Series by scoring the winning run as a pinch runner in Game 2 of the ALCS against the Boston Red Sox, tagging at third and scoring on a short fly ball by B. J. Upton in the bottom of the 11th inning.

During 2009 spring training, Perez injured his wrist on March 10 during a game against the Toronto Blue Jays after trying to make a diving catch. He left the game, and missed significant time during the 2009 season.

He was activated from the disabled list and was called up in the roster expansions and filled in for the injured B. J. Upton in September. Perez was one of six Ivy Leaguers on major league rosters at the beginning of the 2009 season.

On defense, in his major league career he played 23 games in center field, 13 games in left field, and 3 games in right field, and had a 1.000 fielding percentage.

==== Back to the minors ====
Perez spent the 2010 season with the Triple-A Durham Bulls.

=== Chicago Cubs system ===
On January 8, 2011, Perez was traded to the Chicago Cubs with Matt Garza and minor league pitcher Zac Rosscup for Hak-Ju Lee, Brandon Guyer, Robinson Chirinos, Chris Archer, and Cubs outfielder Sam Fuld. He was released on July 8, after hitting .238 and stealing 17 bases in 19 attempts for the AAA Iowa Cubs and seeing no time in the majors in 2011.

=== New York Mets system ===
Perez signed a minor league contract with the New York Mets on July 18, 2011, and was assigned to the Triple-A Buffalo Bisons.

=== Independent minor leagues and retirement ===
Perez became a free agent after the 2011 season and did not sign with any team, eventually taking the 2012 season off.

In 2013, he played for the Sugar Land Skeeters and the Lancaster Barnstormers of the independent Atlantic League. He retired from baseball in 2014.

== Major league coaching career ==
Ahead of the 2021 season, Perez was hired by the San Francisco Giants as a video coach, and was the director of video coaching until 2024. Perez posted on his LinkedIn profile that he became the Detroit Tigers' Coordinator of Content and Learning starting in January 2025.

== Baseball analyst ==
While injured during the 2009 season, Perez wrote a baseball blog for The New York Times.

In 2015, Perez signed on as a baseball analyst with MLB.com. Perez wrote a column for Vice Sports in 2016 and 2017. He also made videos for Bleacher Report on Champions League soccer.
