= Sam Fuld =

American baseball player (born 1981)

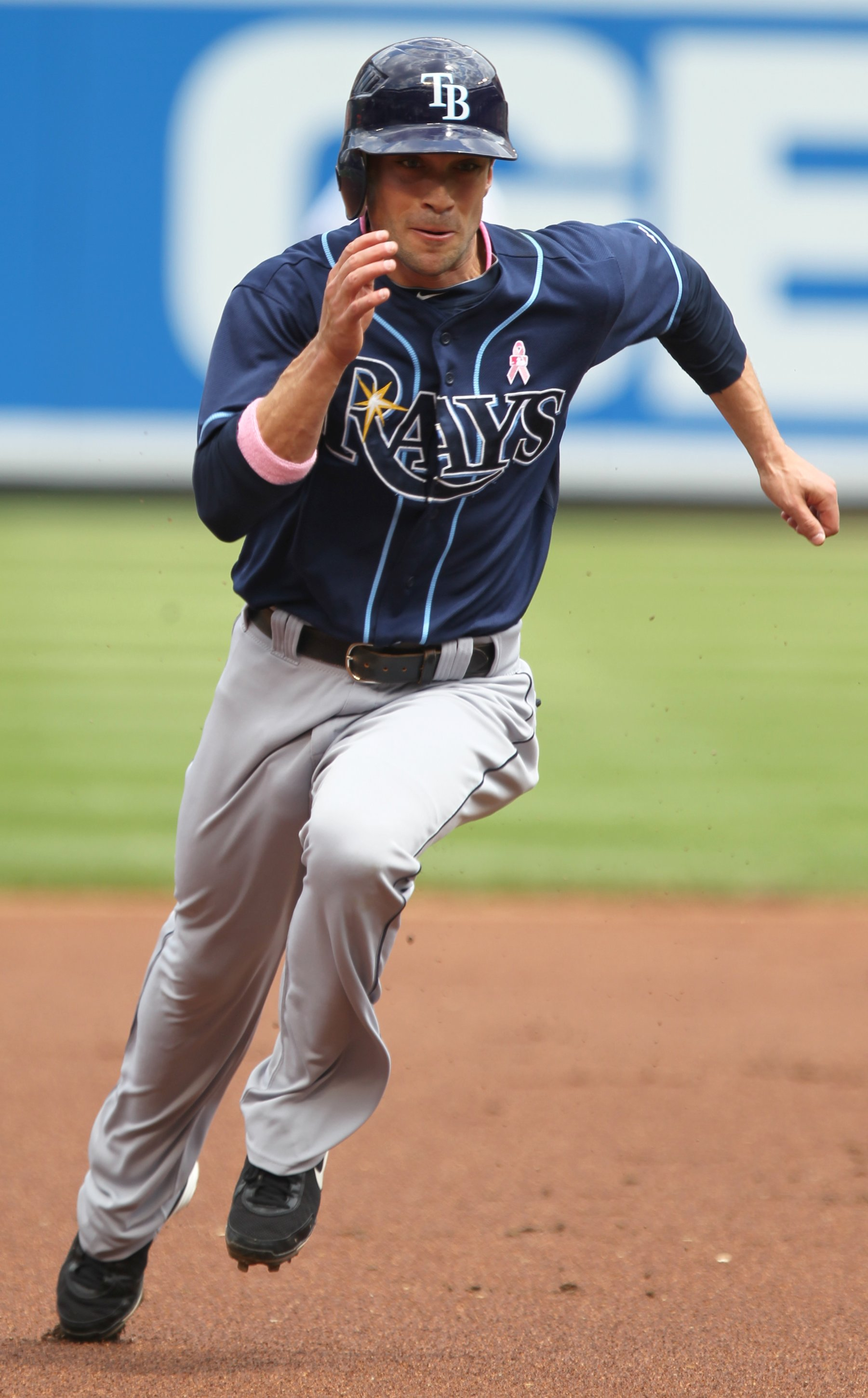
- Fuld with the Tampa Bay Rays

Philadelphia Phillies
- Outfielder / General manager
- Born: November 20, 1981 (age 44); Durham, New Hampshire, U.S.
- Batted: Left Threw: Left

MLB debut
- September 5, 2007, for the Chicago Cubs

Last MLB appearance
- October 4, 2015, for the Oakland Athletics

MLB statistics
- Batting average: .227
- Home runs: 12
- Runs batted in: 112
- Stats at Baseball Reference

Teams
- As player: Chicago Cubs (2007, 2009–2010); Tampa Bay Rays (2011–2013); Oakland Athletics (2014); Minnesota Twins (2014); Oakland Athletics (2014–2015); As general manager: Philadelphia Phillies (2021–2024)

Samuel Babson Fuld (born November 20, 1981) is an American former professional baseball outfielder and current executive for the Philadelphia Phillies organization of Major League Baseball (MLB), where he most recently served as the team's general manager. He played eight seasons in MLB for the Chicago Cubs, Tampa Bay Rays, Oakland Athletics, and Minnesota Twins.

He began his baseball career by twice batting .600 in high school, during which time Baseball America ranked him 19th in the country. Fuld played college baseball at Stanford University. There, he was a two-time All-American, set the school record for career runs scored, and established the College World Series record for career hits.

Fuld was selected by the Chicago Cubs in the 2004 Major League Baseball draft. He was an All Star two years later in the Florida State League. A year after that, Fuld was voted the Most Valuable Player in the Arizona Fall League. In the minor leagues—as a result of his defensive play—he was referred to as "a crash test dummy with a death wish", a "human wrecking ball act", a "wall magnet", and a "manager's dream and a trainer's worst nightmare".

Fuld made his major league debut with the Cubs in 2007. He became a fan favorite for his defense and his tendency to run into outfield walls while making catches. Fuld batted .299 in his longest stint with the Cubs, but appeared only in late-season call-ups over three years. After the 2010 season, he was traded to the Tampa Bay Rays. Fuld made the Rays' 2011 opening day roster, and won the jobs of starting left fielder and leadoff hitter by mid-April. Due to early-season heroics, including a "Superman-esque" catch, he was dubbed "Superman", "Super Sam", and "The Legendary Sam Fuld". Fuld's catch was put to Superman-theme music in a YouTube video, and tweets about him went viral. In late April, Fuld led the American League (AL) in both batting average and steals. He played with the Rays through 2013. In 2014–2015, Fuld played for the Oakland A's (for two stints) and Minnesota Twins.

Fuld played center field and batted lead-off for Team Israel at the 2017 World Baseball Classic.

== Early life ==
Fuld was born in Durham, New Hampshire. His father is Jewish and his mother is Catholic, and he has said that he was "kind of raised celebrating both" religions' holidays. He weighed 10 pounds (4.5 kg) at birth." He is the son of Kenneth Fuld, former Dean of the College of Liberal Arts and Professor of Psychology at the University of New Hampshire, and Amanda Merrill, a former New Hampshire State Senator. He is also a second cousin, once removed, of former Lehman Brothers CEO Dick Fuld.

He got his start playing baseball hitting plastic wiffle balls pitched by his grandmother when he was three years old. As a young child, Fuld carried around a copy of The Complete Baseball Handbook instead of a security blanket. "He was only 5 or 6 and he was already computing batting averages and ERAs", his father said. "He'd sit in the bathtub, and I'd say 'If a guy goes 17-for-38, what's his batting average?' What struck me is that he'd perform these operations in very creative ways–not just that he got the right answer, but his methodology, adding in a factor and then dividing by 10, etc. I'd watch him and say 'wow,' just like I said 'wow' when he used to hit."

== High school ==
Fuld attended Berwick Academy as an eighth grader, during which time he made the high school varsity baseball team, and the University of New Hampshire's baseball coach said that he had the best batting swing of any player in the state. He was the team's MVP, and a league All Star. He then transferred to Phillips Exeter Academy in New Hampshire, where he played baseball and soccer, and ran track. Because of the climate, the league played a short baseball season, and some of the games were played as it snowed. Fuld batted .613 as a freshman, and .489 as a sophomore with 11 steals. He led his club to a league title as a junior in 1999, as he batted .600 with 9 steals. As a senior, he hit .550 with 6 homers, 12 RBIs, and 13 stolen bases. He was a three-time team captain and four-time MVP of the varsity baseball team.

He was named a 2000 Pre-season First Team All-American by Baseball America, Collegiate Baseball, USA Today, and Fox Sports. Fuld was also listed 19th among the 100 Top High School Prospects of 2000 by Baseball America, and selected the New Hampshire 2000 Gatorade High School Player of the Year. In addition he was a four-time Central New England Prep School Baseball League All-Conference player.

Fuld also played from 1998 to 2000 with the Dover Post 8 American Legion team. With them, he earned 2000 New Hampshire State Tournament MVP honors. He also led his club to a state championship.

== College ==
"I had pretty much made up my mind, both from my perspective and my parents' perspective, that college would be the best option for me. I really value education and I know if you sign out of high school there is always the opportunity to go back and get your degree, but it's tough to go back for four years when you're done playing ball. And I wanted to get my degree."

— Fuld

Ninety-four colleges approached Fuld after high school, and he chose to attend Stanford University. He was an economics major there, graduating in 2004 with a 3.15 grade point average. He was a two-time All-American and a four-year starter in center field for the Cardinal, playing alongside future major leaguers Carlos Quentin and Jed Lowrie.

In 2001, as a freshman, he batted .357 as he established himself as the team's leadoff hitter. Fuld was fifth in the Pacific-10 (Pac-10) conference in runs scored (56), sixth in walks (32), and ninth in hits (81). In the post-season he hit .596. He earned NCBWA Third Team All-American honors, and was named a Baseball America Second Team Freshman All-American, All-College World Series, All-NCAA Regional, All-Pac-10, and a Collegiate Baseball Honorable Mention Freshman All-American.

As a sophomore in 2002, he led the Pac-10 in hits (110), breaking Stanford's single-season record, while batting .375, third-best in the conference. Fuld also led the conference in total bases (162), was third in runs scored (67) and doubles (20), and fifth in triples (4). He was named a First-Team (ABCA, Baseball America, Baseball Weekly) and Third-Team (Collegiate Baseball, NCBWA) All-American. He was also named a Jewish Sports Review College Baseball First Team All-American, along with future major leaguers Craig Breslow and Adam Greenberg. In addition, Fuld earned the Stanford Jack Shepard Memorial Award and Come Through Award. He batted .421 with two homers in four CWS games, earning a spot on the All-College World Series Team for the second straight year. Fuld also played with Team USA in the summers of 2001 and 2002.

In 2003, Fuld was named a First-Team (NCBWA) and Third-Team (Baseball America) Pre-Season All-American. As a junior, he had 83 regular season runs, tying the school record (# 1 in the Pac-10). He hit .321 with 35 RBIs and 10 steals in 10 attempts, leading the conference in triples (9) while coming in fifth in hits (97), eighth in doubles (18) and total bases (145), and ninth in walks (34). In the post-season his 24 career hits broke the College World Series record of 23 set by Keith Moreland in 1973–75. And commenting on his defense, Stanford coach Mark Marquess said: "If it's in the ballpark, he's going to catch it. He's the premier center fielder in college baseball." He earned All-Pac-10 honors for the third straight season. Reflecting on his college career, Fuld said: "I think one of the things you take away from playing under Coach Marquess is whatever you do, be it baseball or anything else, you do it well and you do it with passion. You do it with excitement because, really, that's the way to go about things. Not only in sports, but beyond sports."

Fuld was drafted in the 24th round (703rd overall) of the 2003 draft by the Chicago Cubs, but did not sign. Marquess thought that Fuld was drafted relatively late because of his size. At 5 ft 10 in, he is not as tall as most major league outfielders. But Fuld said of the Cubs' bid: "It was a generous offer. It was a tough choice." He then led the Cape Cod League with a .450 on base percentage and batted .361 (second in the league) with 14 RBIs and 10 stolen bases in the summer of 2003 for the Hyannis Mets, and was voted a Cape Cod League All Star.

Before the 2004 season, Fuld was named a First-Team (NCBWA), Second-Team (Louisville Slugger), and Third Team (Baseball America, Collegiate Baseball) Pre-season All-American, and an Honorable Mention Pac-10 All-Academic. While playing the outfield at the end of his last college season, he broke his shoulder, tore his labrum, and partially tore his rotator cuff. For the season, he received Honorable Mention to the Pac-10 All-Academic Team and All-Conference Team

When he became Stanford's and the Pac-10's all-time leader in runs scored (268), Fuld said: "It means a lot to break the record. Obviously, a record like that is more of a tribute to the teammates I've had over the last four years." When he graduated from Stanford, he ranked among the school's all-time top 10 in hits (353; # 2), triples (16; # 3T), and doubles (58; # 6T).

Fuld said: "I want to try my hand. It's been a lifelong dream, really, to play professional baseball. I just love it too much not to give it a shot." The Cubs drafted him for a second time, in the 10th round (306th overall) of the 2004 draft, and this time Fuld signed, for a $25,000 signing bonus. When he made it to the major leagues, he became the 78th former Stanford Cardinal to do so. During the baseball off-season, Fuld returned to Stanford to pursue a master's degree in statistics.

== Professional baseball career ==
=== Minor leagues ===
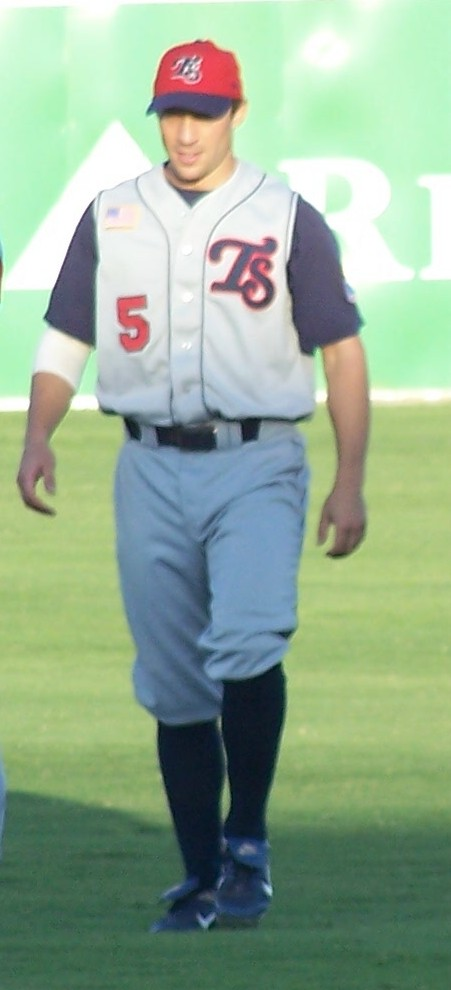
Fuld with the Tennessee Smokies in 2008

The torn labrum injury he incurred in 2004 required surgery and a year of physiotherapy. During that time he read Michael Lewis's book Moneyball and got an internship position with STATS, Inc. of Chicago. "I was one of their reporters, which meant that I looked at game video and plotted the 'TVL'–type, velocity, and location–of every pitch", Fuld said. "They have this grid where you click on exactly where the ball crosses the plate. Play the tape, pause, and repeat." He also began seeking out stats that were not already kept. "There's so many statistics out there that I thought 'There's no stats on foul balls,' so I picked a few players and started tracking them, thinking I'd find something", Fuld said. But his bag that contained the notebook with all his stats was stolen.

Fuld's minor league career began in 2005, when he hit .300 with a .377 OBP and 18 stolen bases in 443 at bats for the Single-A Peoria Chiefs of the Midwest League. He also had a 17-game hit streak, and turned in 7 outfield assists from center field.

Fuld batted .300 with a .378 OBP and 22 steals in 353 at bats for the High-A Daytona Cubs of the Florida State League in 2006, but he missed part of the season with a hip injury. He had surgery for a sports hernia in the off-season. He was named to the league All-Star team.

In 2007, Fuld batted .291 with a .371 on-base percentage, in 282 at bats, as he began the season with the Tennessee Smokies in the Double-A Southern League. "He knows how to play the game, when to take a pitch, when to work the count, and when to go ahead and swing away and juice the ball", said his Tennessee manager, Pat Listach. "He's strong enough that he can hit the ball out of the yard occasionally. He's a gap, line drive type hitter." He was an efficient leadoff batter for Tennessee, with more walks (41) than strikeouts (38). He was touted by Baseball America as having the best strike zone judgment in the organization. "He's a very intelligent player", added Listach. Fuld was also touted by Listach as having the best outfield skills on the team, as he led the Southern League with 13 assists from the outfield. In August, Fuld was promoted to the Iowa Cubs in the Triple-A Pacific Coast League. There, he batted .269, with a .397 on-base percentage.

Fuld played for the Mesa Solar Sox in the Arizona Fall League in the Fall of 2007. On October 30, he was named AFL Player of the Week, after hitting .526. In 29 games with the Solar Sox, Fuld led the league in batting average (.402), hits (43), doubles (11), extra-base hits (16), total bases (67), obp (.492), slugging percentage (.626), and OPS (1.118), and was 3rd in the league in runs (20) and walks (17), 4th in stolen bases (10), and 5th in triples (2). He batted .462 with runners in scoring position, and .500 against lefties. Fuld was named the 2007 Most Valuable Player of the Arizona Fall League, after being the season's dominant player. He also was named to the AFL Top Prospects Team.

Fuld also won the Dernell Stenson Award for Leadership, becoming the first player to win both awards. He donated the money he raised in an auction to the Juvenile Diabetes Research Foundation. "This kid plays the game like it's supposed to be played", said Mesa Solar Sox manager Dave Clark.

"That guy will run through anything."

— Matt Johnson, trainer for the Iowa Cubs

In 2008, Fuld started the season with the Triple-A Iowa Cubs. There, due to his style of defensive play, he was referred to as "a crash test dummy with a death wish", a "human wrecking ball act", a "wall magnet", and a "manager's dream and a trainer's worst nightmare."

Fuld began the 2008 season at Triple-A Iowa, but was demoted to the Double-A Tennessee Smokies in May after struggling at the plate due to a right thumb injury. After hitting no higher than .245 in May, June, and July, he batted .345/.424/.445 in August. Fuld averaged only 1 strikeout per 9.9 at bats, good for fifth-best in the Southern League.

Fuld had a "big winter" playing winter ball in Venezuela on the Tigres de Aragua, who he helped lead to a championship. He hit leadoff for Aragua, while batting .322 with 5 triples (leading the league), 36 walks and 43 runs (2nd), 16 doubles (5th), a .425 on-base percentage (7th), and a .938 OPS (8th). For his 2008–09 winter performance, including walking nearly twice as much as he struck out, he was elected to the Baseball America All Winter League Team.

Fuld began 2009 at Iowa, and hit .286 with 20 stolen bases and 8 triples in 73 games, including .326 versus left-handed pitchers, primarily playing center field until he was called up on June 30. He walked 32 times compared to 22 strikeouts in 319 plate appearances, and had a .309 batting average with runners in scoring position.

=== Major leagues ===
==== Chicago Cubs ====
===== 2007 =====
"Fuld is a great baserunner, excellent defender, a tough kid. He's a run-through-the-wall-for-you guy."

— Cubs General Manager Jim Hendry, at the time of Fuld's call-up.

In September 2007, the Chicago Cubs called Fuld up to the major league team. He was the 37th ballplayer from New Hampshire to make it to the major leagues. He made his debut September 5 against the Los Angeles Dodgers, as a defensive replacement. "I have so much respect for players like (Cubs first baseman) Derrek Lee", Fuld said. "They're great players. But to meet them and actually play with them and contribute and help them win is kind of a surreal experience. It doesn't seem too long ago that I was going to Fenway (Park in Boston) and idolizing these guys. I feel like a fan at times. I have to remind myself I'm a player."

That month he was "forced" to sing Stanford's fight song on the team bus, as part of his rookie treatment. Later in the month, he was hazed after a game—made to walk from the park in Cincinnati to the team's downtown hotel in a Batgirl getup, accompanied by Félix Pie in pink baby pajamas, Carmen Pignatiello (as Supergirl), and Kevin Hart (as Wonder Woman). After peeking at his outfit, before he had to don it, Fuld said: "I think it was Batgirl. I was actually looking forward to it, believe it or not. [I didn't try it on] I'm pretty sure I would've looked good in it. Black's my color. I never did the frat thing in college, so this would kind of be like that." In mid-September, as manager Lou Piniella had still not given Fuld an at bat, someone on the team hung a "Moonlight Graham" sign in Fuld's locker.

Against the Pittsburgh Pirates on September 22, 2007, playing right field as a defensive replacement, Fuld raced back and made a "spectacular", "daredevil", catch just left of the 368-foot-marker in right-center field at Wrigley Field, slamming into the ivy-covered brick wall and robbing the Pirates' Nyjer Morgan of extra bases. Fuld then bounced off the bricks and threw the ball to first base, doubling off a Pirates baserunner (see video of Fuld catch and throw to first). "That was amazing", said Fuld. "They were going crazy." General Manager Jim Hendry said: "That's as good a play as I've seen by a Cubs player at Wrigley Field since I've been here." The play later made ESPN on Baseball Tonight as the # 1 web gem of the day. After the season, Paul Sullivan of the Chicago Tribune cited it as the Cubs' "Play of the Year." Many Cub fans refer to it as: "The Catch."

===== 2008 =====
In 2008, Fuld pushed Pie for the center field spot during spring training. Piniella said that Pie was only "a head or nose in front" of Fuld. Hendry observed: "[Fuld] can run. He's a tremendous defensive player." Hendry also indicated that Fuld was among the club's untouchables, saying: "We're not going to trade [Fuld]. It's pretty simple." In late March, however, Piniella chose Pie to open the season as the starting center fielder over Fuld, and sent Fuld down to the minor leagues.

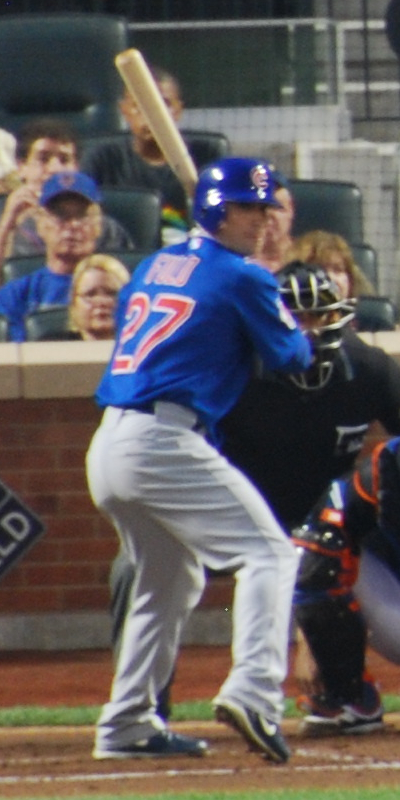
Fuld batting for the Chicago Cubs in 2009

===== 2009 =====
Fuld played for the Cubs in spring training in 2009, but was sent down to their AAA team in late March to work on stealing bases. He was called back up on June 30. Hendry said: "Sammy has been really hot. This will let Lou (manager Piniella) mix and match with outfield defense until Reed (Johnson) comes back."

On July 1, 2009, Fuld recorded his first major league hit in his first major league start of the season and the second start of his career. Leading off the game Fuld hit a double against Virgil Vasquez of the Pittsburgh Pirates at PNC Park. In the fourth inning Fuld made a sliding catch of a sinking liner (see video of Fuld's sliding catch robbing Vazquez of a hit), and in the fifth inning he fielded a single and threw out Jack Wilson at home (see video). "It was huge", said Cubs starter Randy Wells. "Sam Fuld, man, he gets to so many balls. He made a [heck] of a play throwing that guy out—the perfect throw." The following month, he crashed into the left field wall while making a sliding catch in a game against the Dodgers (see video of Fuld making wall-crashing catch).

Fuld hit the first home run of his major league career in the final game of the Cubs' 2009 season, on October 4 at Wrigley Field. He finished the season batting .299, and with the highest on-base percentage (.409) of any Cubs player with 100 or more plate appearances.

===== 2010 =====
Carrie Muskat, the Cubs' MLB.com beat reporter, wrote on March 1, 2010, that: "I can see Fuld making the Cubs' Opening Day roster... Fuld has shown he can handle the part-time workload, can play all three positions, and can be used as a defensive sub or pinch-runner." On March 30, however, the Cubs sent him down to AAA Iowa. Piniella remarked: "The decisions weren't easy." He was called up to Chicago for the first time in the 2010 season on August 19, and ended the season with only a handful of at bats.

Baseball writer Rob Neyer, noting that this followed Fuld batting .299 with a .409 on-base percentage for the Cubs, wrote, "don't you think you could find a place for a fast guy who gets on base and plays great defense? The Cubs did find a place for him. No, not Wrigley Field. Not Heaven, either. Iowa. Again. Where Fuld posted a .383 on-base percentage.... I'm telling you, there are worse fourth outfielders on half the teams in the majors right now." A writer for the American Spectator mused: "what were the Cubs thinking ...? ... perhaps decision makers ... didn't ... pencil him into lineup cards because they were prejudiced against players of Fuld's stature. But those who don't believe guys of Fuld's size can be solid major league players should be sentenced to sit in the corner under the dunce hat, and read Joe Morgan's statistics over and over."

==== Tampa Bay Rays ====
===== 2011 =====
Fuld's play with the Cubs was limited to late-season call-ups over three years, including just 40 starts. After the 2010 season, they traded him to the Tampa Bay Rays. He was traded with minor leaguers Hak-Ju Lee, Brandon Guyer, Robinson Chirinos, and Chris Archer for starting pitcher Matt Garza, outfielder Fernando Perez, and reliever Zac Rosscup.

Manager Joe Maddon noted Fuld's outstanding walks-to-strikeouts ratio, which Maddon referred to as "freaky-weird": 325 walks vs. 272 strikeouts in his professional career. Maddon said: "He's a major-league baseball player right now.... He's been needing opportunity; he's probably going to get the opportunity here right now." He also observed that Fuld was a:

very, very good defender. He has really great instincts out there, and a fine arm. He works excellent at bats.... If somebody were to get hurt, this guy could fill in on a regular basis for a while. He's not going to be overwhelmed by anything. Great makeup.... He's a pretty tough kid.

Rays hitting coach Derek Shelton noted that: "[Fuld's] contact ratio is off the charts. He has probably one of the shortest swings I've ever seen." General manager Andrew Friedman said: "He's a guy with a very interesting profile. He's a plus defender in all three (outfield) spots, with superior contact skills, and a really good ability to discern balls and strikes ... and an ability to hit line drives with ... high frequency."

Fuld made the team's Opening Day roster, his first in the majors, as its fourth outfielder, and a late-inning weapon off the bench, speedster pinch runner, and defensive replacement. Tommy Rancel of ESPN described him as: "Tampa Bay's version of Brett Gardner; albeit in a reduced role". However, with Manny Ramirez sudden retirement, left fielder Johnny Damon became the team's DH, expanding Fuld's role. On April 7, he stole a career-high 3 bases in one game, and Maddon began penciling him into the lineup as the team's everyday leadoff hitter.

On April 9, playing right field against the Chicago White Sox who had the bases loaded, Fuld made what the Tampa Tribune called "one of the best catches in team history". Rays center fielder B.J. Upton said: "Oh my god, oh my. I thought he was going to dive into the [wall].... I was screaming from center field when he caught it. 'Great catch!' Should be play of the year so far." His popularity spread on the internet by late April, with the Toronto Sun writing: "Fuld ranks in the Top 10 in batting average, runs, and triples, and also leads the AL in stolen bases and YouTube hits, especially video hits for a catch in Chicago diving towards the right field corner onto the warning track that has been set to a Superman theme."

Later in the month Maddon compared Fuld's play favorably to that of Gold Glove left fielder Carl Crawford, saying that Fuld had a better arm, and compared his style of play to that of former perennial Gold Glove center fielder Jim Edmonds.

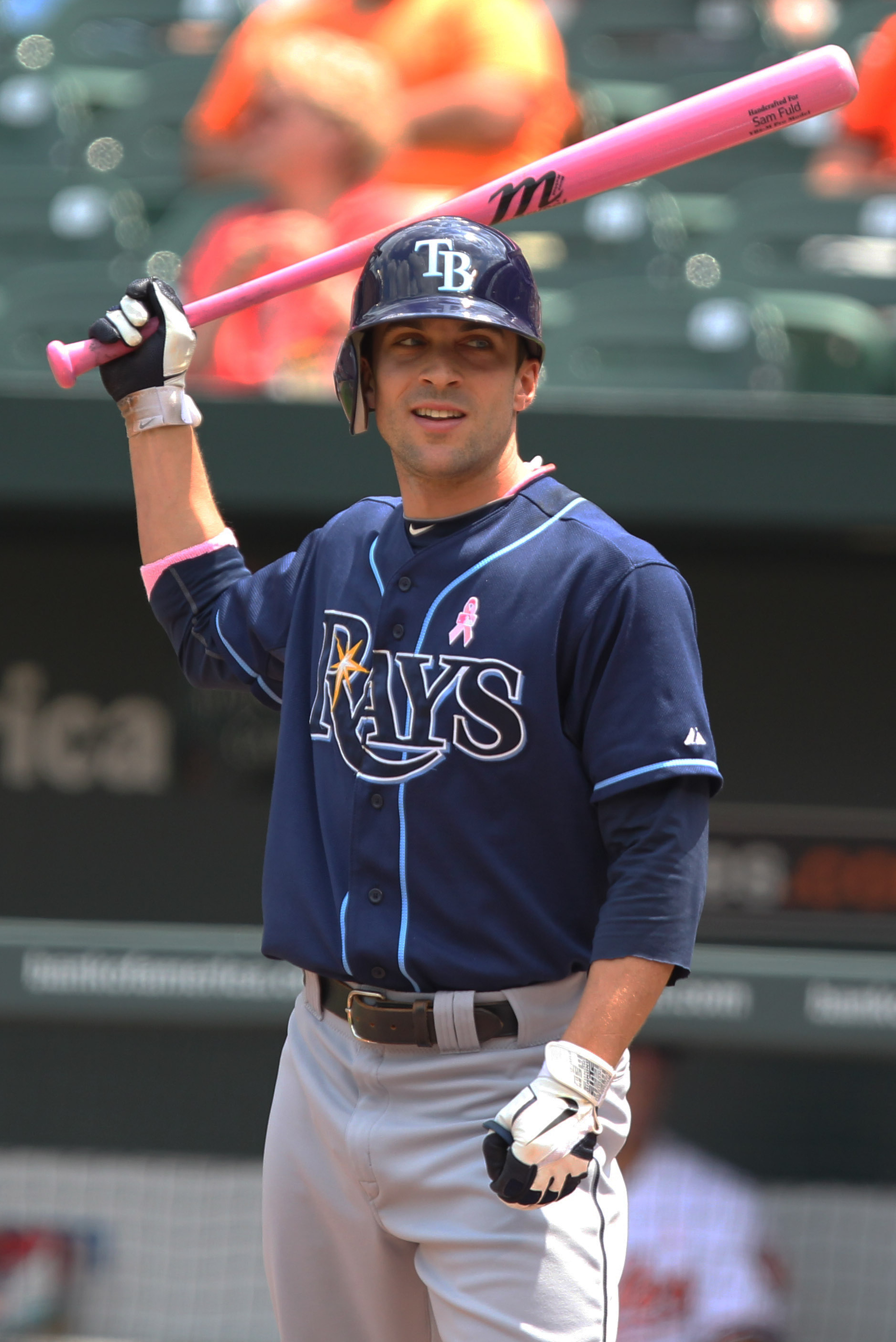
Fuld with the Rays (2011)

On April 11, as a reporter for major league baseball described it, Fuld "turned Fenway Park into his personal playground." Fuld missed hitting for the cycle only because he opted to stretch a single into a double. He had already hit a double, triple, and home run in a game against the Boston Red Sox when he came up in the 9th inning in a runaway game which the Rays won 16–5. Had he stopped at first base, he would have been the second player in Tampa Bay Rays history to hit for the cycle, joining B.J. Upton. Maddon observed that Fuld's refusal to stop at first reflected his integrity. He became the fifth player in Tampa Bay history to have four extra-base hits in a game, and the first since Tomás Pérez in 2006. His four extra-base hits and 11 total bases were also records for a Fenway Park debut.

His "Superman" YouTube video was joked about on Twitter with tweets at the #LegendofSamFuld hash tag, such as "Sam Fuld was once intentionally walked while in the on deck circle", "The Red Sox check under their bed for Sam Fuld", and Maddon's favorite: "Superman wears a Sam Fuld T-shirt to bed." Though not a Twitter user, Fuld caught on quickly: When reporters asked him the next day why he could not stop the rain that was causing a rainout, Fuld quipped: "This is me, washing my planet". By mid-April, he had won the starting left fielder position and leadoff hitter slot with the Rays.

On April 18, a week after his four-hit Fenway Park debut, Fuld had four hits in four at bats against the White Sox. That raised his batting average to an AL-leading .396, to go along with his league lead in stolen bases. His batting average was the second-highest in team history through April 18 in a season, behind only Fred McGriff (1998). He became the first Tampa Bay leadoff batter with two four-hit games in a season since Carl Crawford, who did it twice in 2005, and the first major leaguer to have two four-hit games in the 2011 season. He was fourth in the league in hits (21), fifth in on-base percentage (.431) and OPS (1.035), tied for fifth in doubles (6), sixth in slugging percentage (.604), and was third-toughest player to strike out (one strikeout per 14.5 plate appearances). As of April 25, he was leading the AL with 10 stolen bases. A reporter for major league baseball, in explaining his rise to fame, wrote: "you won't find any other 5-foot-9... New Hampshire-born, Jewish, diabetic outfielders in the Baseball Encyclopedia.

He made another diving, face-planting catch of a sinking line drive, leading Rays pitcher David Price to say: "I heard that the world is covered by 75 percent water, and the other 25 percent is covered by Sam Fuld." As of April 20, Fuld led Baseball Tonight's Web Gem standings with 18 points, which included Web Gems at each outfield position. A writer for The American Spectator observed: "he owns the 11 o-clock highlight reel. (My sources inform me that ESPN executives are considering changing the name of "Baseball Tonight" to "The Sam Fuld Show.")" In late April, he was placed on the American League ballot for the 2011 All-Star Game.

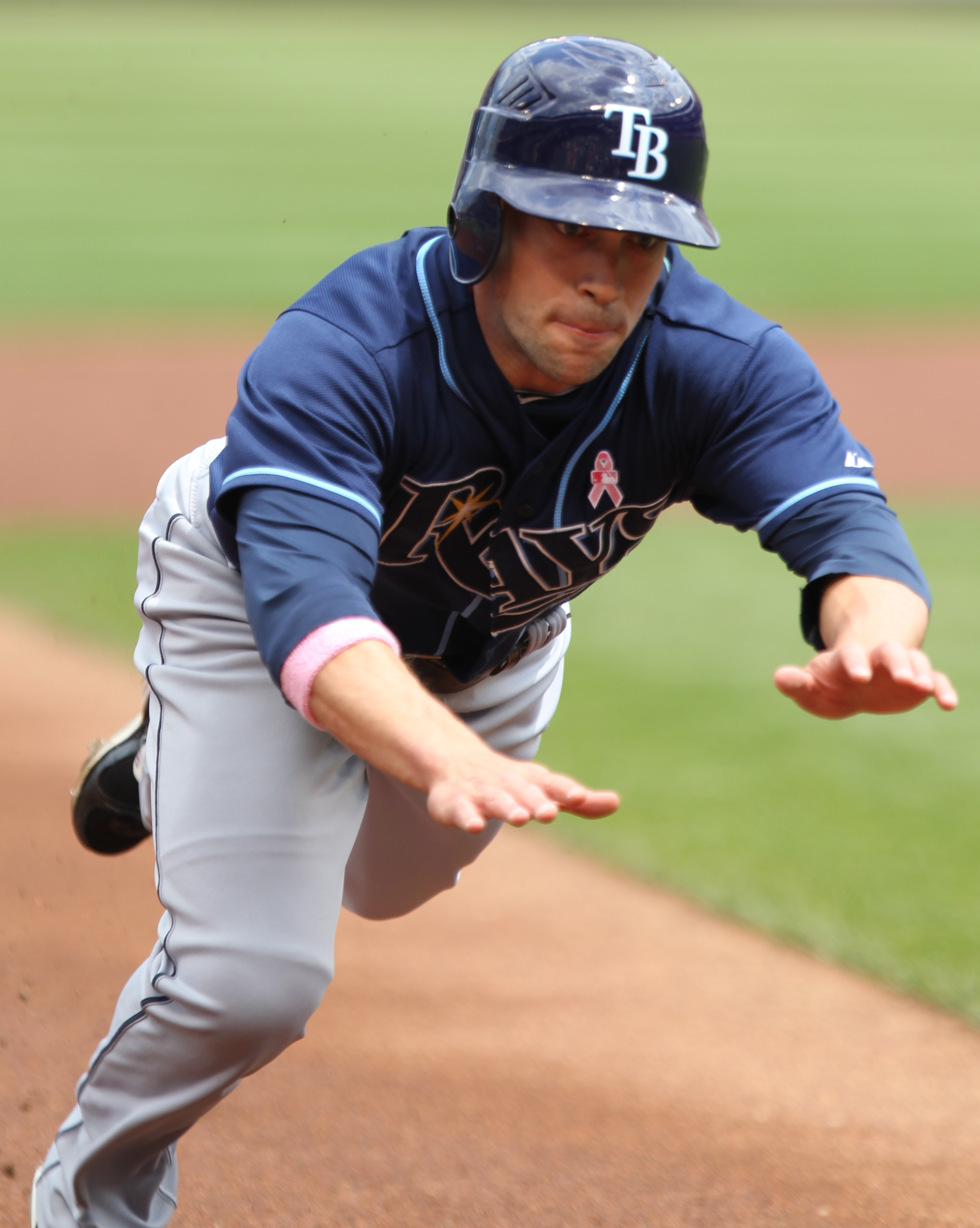
Fuld sliding into a base in 2011

The press and the Rays began to refer to him by the nicknames "Superman", "Super Sam", and "The Legendary Sam Fuld". The Rays gave away Super Sam Fuld Superhero Capes to children at the team's May 29 game.

In a game against the Brewers on June 20, 2011, he reported to the pitcher's mound in the 8th inning and warmed up in order to give a relief pitcher time to warm up in the bull pen. He did not throw a recorded pitch, or appear as a pitcher in the box score.

Fuld finished the season with a .240 batting average, and tied for second on the team in stolen bases, with 20.

===== 2012 =====
Fuld initially injured ligaments in his right wrist in September 2011, but re-aggravated them on a swing in spring training on March 23, 2012. On April 3, Dr. Thomas Graham performed surgery to repair his wrist ligaments. Fuld missed the first 96 games of the season, and made his 2012 debut on July 24, playing in 44 games during the season.

===== 2013 =====
On September 2, 2013, against the Los Angeles Angels, Fuld recorded one out as a pitcher, getting J. B. Shuck to fly out to end the eighth inning. He pitched at speeds topping out at 88 MPH. He was the third position player to pitch in Rays history, joining Wade Boggs (in 1999) and Josh Wilson (in 2007).

On September 30, during the 163rd game of the season and tiebreaker to determine the last American League wildcard playoff spot against the Texas Rangers, Fuld scored the fifth run of the game, stealing third base and coming home on an error by Rangers pitcher Tanner Scheppers.

For the season, he played in 70 games as a substitute, which were the most by any AL player since Brian Anderson played in 70 with the White Sox in 2008, and was one of six AL outfielders to start at least 10 games at all each outfield position.

After the season, Fuld was non-tendered by the Rays, making him a free agent. Through 2017, Fuld had the highest contact rate in Rays’ history among batters with at least 500 plate appearances.

==== Oakland Athletics (2014) ====
Fuld signed a minor league deal with the Oakland Athletics on January 4, 2014. On April 12, after he played in seven games, Fuld was designated for assignment to make room on the active roster for Craig Gentry. Oakland was required to put Fuld on waivers within 10 days, and could only retain him if he was not claimed on waivers by another team.

==== Minnesota Twins (2014) ====
Fuld was claimed on waivers by the Minnesota Twins on April 20, 2014. He played in 13 games with the Twins, hitting .250 before suffering a concussion on May 2 after he crashed into a wall. He woke up with a headache on May 8, and was placed on the 7-day disabled list that day. He had been starting in center field that week as the replacement for Aaron Hicks, who had also suffered a concussion. After a setback in his recovery on May 14, he was transferred to the 15-day disabled list on May 22. He batted .274 with a team-leading .370 OBP and 12 stolen bases for the Twins, in 53 games, before being traded.

==== Oakland Athletics (second stint; 2014–16) ====
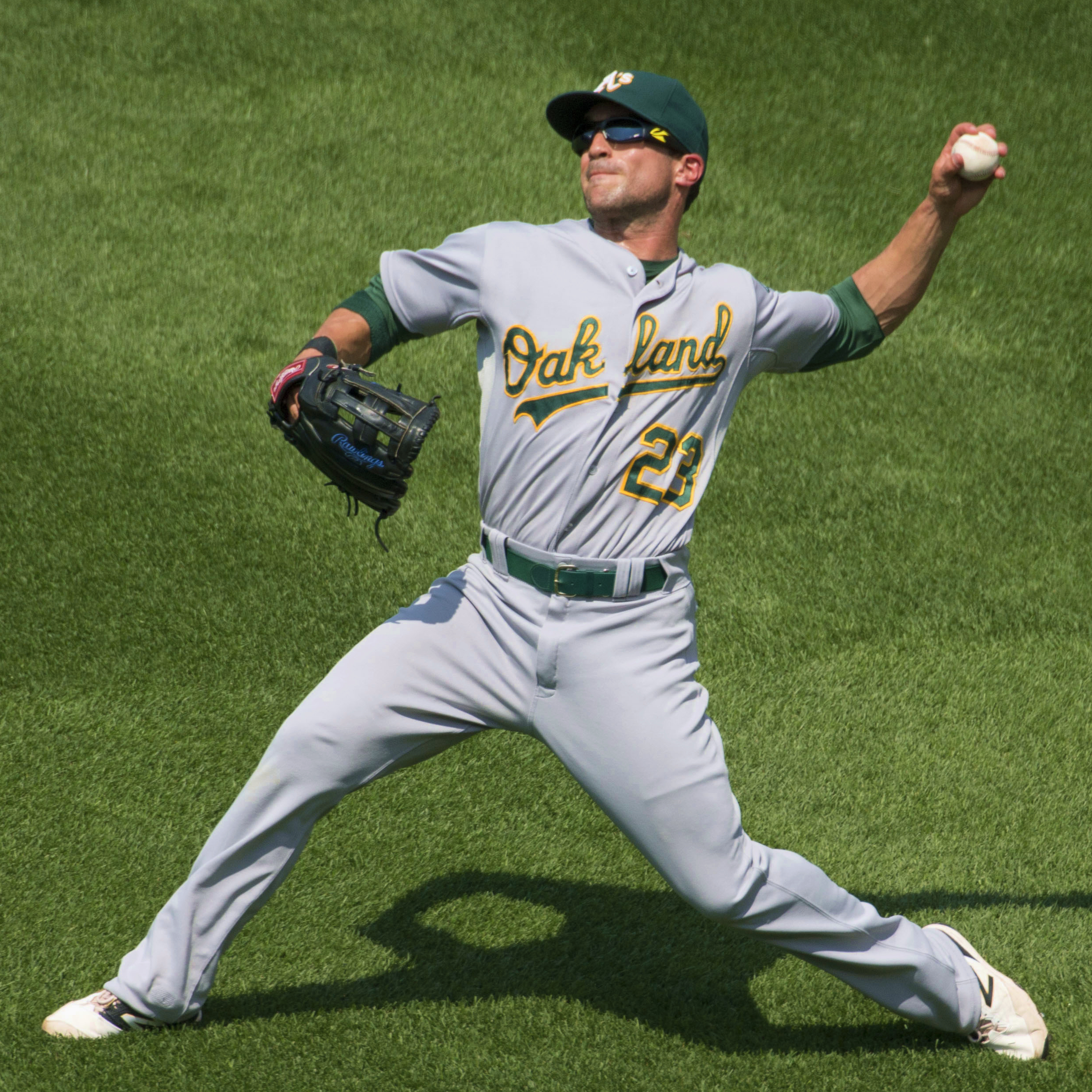
Fuld in 2015

On July 31, 2014, the Twins traded Fuld to the Oakland Athletics for pitcher Tommy Milone. On September 30, in the Athletics' wildcard game against the Kansas City Royals, Fuld reached base three times.

In the 2014 season, Fuld batted .239 in 113 games overall. He stole 21 bases in 25 attempts, with his 84% percentage tying for the ninth-best percentage in the American League. He stole third base six times, tying for seventh in the AL. His five assists from center field, where he started 58 games, tied him for fifth among AL center fielders, and his career-high 11 total assists tied him for seventh among AL outfielders.

In 2015, in a career-high 120 games Fuld batted .197 for the A's, playing primarily center field and left field. He led the league in double plays turned from left field, with three. His seven assists from left field, where he started 23 games, tied him for fourth among AL left fielders.

In 2016, Fuld suffered a left shoulder rotator cuff injury that necessitated surgery, after he batted .417 in spring training for the A's. He was put on the disabled list, and did not play in the regular season. He retired in November 2017.

== Executive career ==
On November 3, 2017, Fuld retired as a player and was named major league player information coordinator for the Philadelphia Phillies under new manager Gabe Kapler. In that position he worked closely with the team's players, coaches, front office, and the research and development department, to "integrate the use of information in all areas of on-field performance and preparation and make recommendations regarding the most effective areas of future research and analysis."

After the 2018 season the Toronto Blue Jays interviewed Fuld to be their next manager, and he reportedly “made a strong impression”, but withdrew his name from consideration. At the same time, Gerry Fraley, writer for The Dallas Morning News, opined that Fuld was an interesting possibility to be hired as the next Texas Rangers manager.

After the 2019 regular season, Fuld's name was mentioned by a number of people as a candidate for the position of manager with the Pittsburgh Pirates. At the same time, NBC in Chicago mentioned him as a possible candidate to be the new manager for the Chicago Cubs, Joel Sherman mentioned him as an "off the beaten road" possibility to manage the New York Mets, and he was also mentioned as a possible managerial candidate for both the San Francisco Giants and the Philadelphia Phillies. R.J. Anderson, writing for CBS Sports, opined: "He's on the fast track to holding down a managerial post of his own." Jayson Stark also mentioned him as someone teams could consider as a new manager.

After the 2020 season, he was reportedly a finalist for the position of manager of the Boston Red Sox.

On July 14, 2020, Fuld returned to the field, playing Center Field during a Phillies Summer Camp exhibition game.

On December 22, 2020, Fuld was announced as the new general manager of the Philadelphia Phillies.

On December 19, 2022, the Phillies extended Fuld's contract through the 2025 season.

On November 8, 2024, the Phillies announced that Fuld would step down as the team's general manager and begin a transition to a role as the team's president of business operations. Preston Mattingly succeeded Fuld as general manager. Fuld graduated from the University of Pennsylvania's Wharton School with a Master of Business Administration (MBA) degree and assumed the new role in 2026. Following the 2026 season, he declined an offer from the Athletics to be their president of baseball operations.

== World Baseball Classic – Team Israel ==
Fuld was the starting center fielder and batted lead-off for Team Israel at the 2017 World Baseball Classic.

== Personal life ==
In June 2009, Fuld married Sarah Kolodner. He had met her while they were fellow students at Phillips Exeter Academy. She was recruited by Princeton University for their lacrosse team, and won two national lacrosse championships.

=== Diabetes ===
"[Diabetes is] definitely a battle every day; something that's always on my mind, and never quite figured out. It's like hitting in that way."

— Fuld

Fuld was diagnosed with Type 1 diabetes when he was 10 years old. He recalled, "I was losing weight, I was thirsty all the time, just classic symptoms, so my parents knew something was wrong and the doctor diagnosed it right away. It was tough, but when I realized there was no other alternative, I just looked at it as a challenge."

At the age of 12, he met pitcher Bill Gullickson, who also had diabetes, and talked to him for 10 minutes. "That was enough to inspire me", Fuld said. "Any time I can talk to young diabetic kids, I look forward to that opportunity", said Gullickson.

Fuld was comfortable handling the kidding in the clubhouse regarding his treatments. "We dish it out pretty good about his insulin shots", said his AA manager Pat Listach. "We always give him stuff about putting needles in the refrigerator, and shooting up in the clubhouse. He takes it all in stride. He's a good guy."

== Recognition and awards ==
- 2000: 1st Team High School All-American (Baseball America, Collegiate Baseball, USA Today, and Fox Sports)
- 2000: 19th on Baseball America's 100 Top High School Prospects list
- 2000: New Hampshire High School Baseball Player of the Year (Gatorade)
- 2001: 2nd Team College Freshman All-American OF (Baseball America)
- 2002: 1st Team College All-American OF (ABCA, Baseball America, Baseball Weekly, and Jewish Sports Review)
- 2002: College World Series All-Tournament Team OF
- 2003: 1st Team All-American (NCBWA)
- 2003: Cape Cod League All-Star OF
- 2003: Set College World Series all-time record for career hits
- 2004: 1st Team All-American (NCBWA)
- 2004: Set Pac-10 all-time record for career runs scored
- 2006: Florida State League All-Star OF
- 2007: Arizona Fall League Top Prospects Team
- 2007: Arizona Fall League Dernell Stenson Award
- 2007: Arizona Fall League Most Valuable Player
- 2008–09: All Winter League Team (Baseball America)
- 2014: Cape Cod Baseball League Hall of Fame

== See also ==
- List of Jewish Major League Baseball players
