= Zac Rosscup =

American baseball player (born 1988)

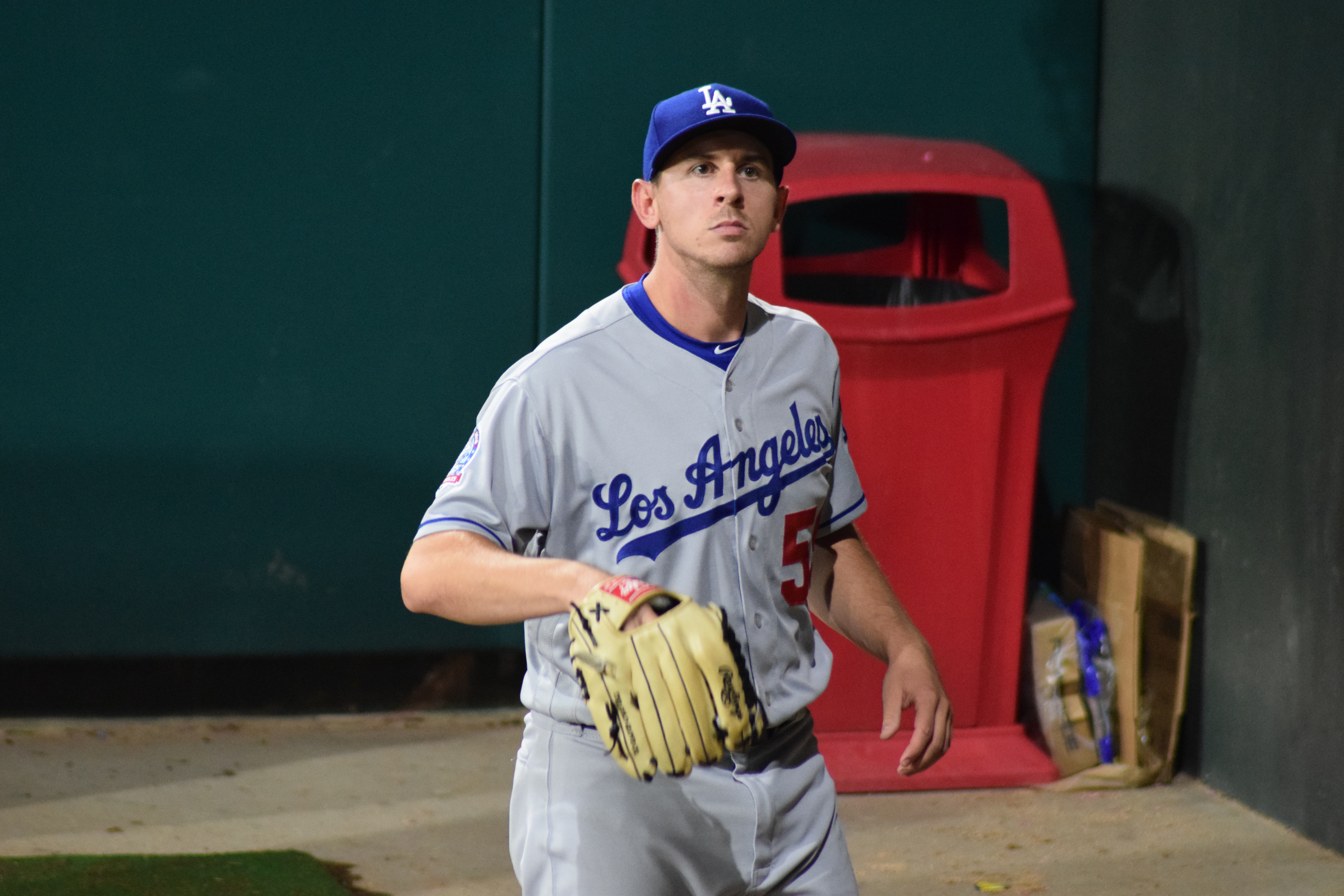
- Rosscup with the Los Angeles Dodgers in 2018

Piratas de Campeche – No. 51
- Relief pitcher
- Born: June 9, 1988 (age 38); Clackamas, Oregon, U.S.
- Bats: Right Throws: Left

MLB debut
- September 3, 2013, for the Chicago Cubs

MLB statistics (through 2021 season)
- Win–loss record: 5–2
- Earned run average: 5.09
- Strikeouts: 117
- Stats at Baseball Reference

Teams
- Chicago Cubs (2013–2015, 2017); Colorado Rockies (2017); Los Angeles Dodgers (2018); Seattle Mariners (2019); Toronto Blue Jays (2019); Los Angeles Dodgers (2019); Colorado Rockies (2021)

Zachary Martin Rosscup (born June 9, 1988) is an American professional baseball pitcher for the Piratas de Campeche of the Mexican League. He has previously played in Major League Baseball (MLB) for the Chicago Cubs, Colorado Rockies, Los Angeles Dodgers, Seattle Mariners, and Toronto Blue Jays.

== Amateur career ==
Born in Clackamas, Oregon, Rosscup attended Forest Grove High School. Rosscup later attended Chemeketa Community College for two seasons, before being drafted in the MLB. During his freshman season at Chemeketa, Rosscup held a 1.55 ERA and earned numerous honors.

== Professional career ==
=== Tampa Bay Rays ===
Rosscup was drafted by the Tampa Bay Rays in the 28th round, 859th overall, of the 2009 Major League Baseball draft out of Chemeketa Community College. Rosscup made his professional debut with the rookie-level Princeton Rays, posting a 3-4 record and 2.68 ERA in 10 games. In 2010, Rosscup split the season between the Gulf Coast League Rays and the Low-A Hudson Valley Renegades, accumulating a 3-1 record and 2.64 ERA in 12 appearances, 8 of them starts.

=== Chicago Cubs ===
On January 8, 2011, the Rays traded Rosscup alongside Matt Garza and Fernando Perez to the Chicago Cubs in exchange for Sam Fuld, Chris Archer, Hak-Ju Lee, Brandon Guyer, and Robinson Chirinos. He was assigned to the High-A Daytona Cubs to begin the season, and recorded a 4-2 record and 2.54 ERA in 11 appearances with the team. Rosscup split the 2012 season between the AZL Cubs, Single-A Peoria Chiefs, and Double-A Tennessee Smokies, pitching to a 2-1 record and 3.45 ERA with 45 strikeouts in 31.1 innings of work between the three teams. He was assigned to Tennessee to begin the 2012 season and received a promotion to the Triple-A Iowa Cubs in August.

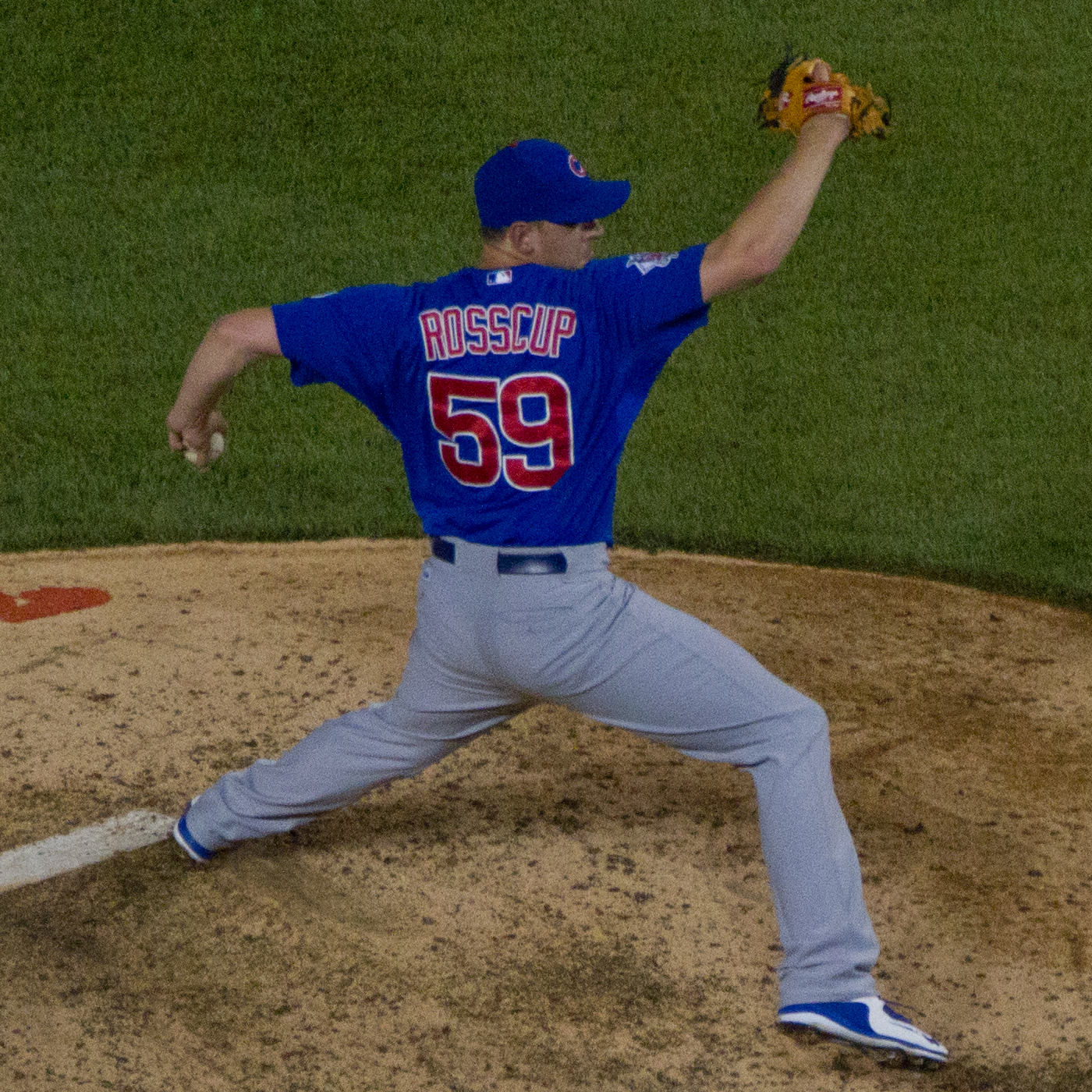
Rosscup with the Chicago Cubs

On September 3, 2013, Rosscup was selected to the 40-man roster and called up to the majors for the first time. He made his MLB debut the same day, pitching two-thirds of an inning and allowing no runs against the Miami Marlins. In 10 games in his rookie season, he had an ERA of 1.35 with 7 strikeouts in 6.2 innings pitched. Despite his performance in 2013, Rosscup started the 2014 season at Triple-A Rosscup was called up again on April 16, 2014, to be available for the Cubs' day-night doubleheader. On September 23, 2014, Rosscup was credited with his first career win in a walk off Cubs victory against the St. Louis Cardinals. Rosscup finished the season with a 9.45 ERA in 18 appearances with the big league club. In 2015, Rosscup made 33 appearances out of the bullpen for Chicago, registering a 4.39 ERA with 29 strikeouts in 26.2 innings of work.

On February 25, 2016, Rosscup was placed on the disabled list with left shoulder inflammation, an injury that had plagued him for part of the 2015 season as well. Rosscup would miss the entire 2016 season with the injury. On December 2, Rosscup was non-tendered by Chicago and became a free agent. He re-signed with the Cubs on a minor league contract on December 9. Rosscup began the 2017 season in Iowa before being selected to the active roster on May 22, 2017. Rosscup pitched two-thirds of a scoreless inning for Chicago before he was designated for assignment on June 22.

=== Colorado Rockies ===
On June 26, 2017, Rosscup was traded to the Colorado Rockies in exchange for Matt Carasiti. Rosscup made his Rockies debut against the New York Mets at Citi Field on July 14 to pitch in relief for Jon Gray, who left the game in the third inning. Rosscup split the remainder of the year between Colorado and the Triple-A Albuquerque Isotopes, posting a 5.14 ERA in 9 games with the Rockies. Rosscup was assigned to Albuquerque to begin the 2018 season and recorded a 1.08 ERA in 10 games after missing the beginning of the year with a left middle finger blister.

=== Los Angeles Dodgers ===
On July 11, 2018, Rosscup was claimed off waivers by the Los Angeles Dodgers. Rosscup played in 1 game each for the Triple-A Oklahoma City Dodgers and the High-A Rancho Cucamonga Quakes. On August 19, 2018, Rosscup threw an immaculate inning against the Seattle Mariners at Safeco Field in Seattle, Washington. In 17 games for the Dodgers, he struck out 20 batters in 11 1/3 innings and logged a 4.76 ERA. Rosscup was designated for assignment by the Dodgers on November 20, 2018 and released the following day.

=== Seattle Mariners ===
On December 20, 2018, Rosscup signed a one-year contract with the Seattle Mariners. In 14 innings with Seattle, he struck out 20 and registered a 3.21 ERA while allowing 14 walks. Rosscup was designated for assignment on May 17, 2019, following the promotion of Ryan Garton.

=== Toronto Blue Jays ===
On May 23, 2019, Rosscup was claimed off of waivers by the Toronto Blue Jays. Rosscup made 2 appearances for Toronto, but struggled to a 27.00 ERA before being designated for assignment on May 28. On June 2, Rosscup was assigned outright to the Triple-A Buffalo Bisons, but elected free agency rather than report.

=== Los Angeles Dodgers (second stint) ===
On June 12, 2019, Rosscup signed a minor league contract with the Los Angeles Dodgers organization. He was assigned to the Triple-A Oklahoma City Dodgers upon signing. On June 27, the Dodgers selected him to the active roster. On July 15, he was designated for assignment by the Dodgers after registering a 6.00 ERA in 7 appearances. He was outrighted to Triple-A on July 20.

=== St. Louis Cardinals ===
On July 29, 2019, Rosscup was traded to the St. Louis Cardinals in exchange for cash considerations. Rosscup finished the year with the Triple-A Memphis Redbirds, logging a 4.50 ERA in 8 games. He elected free agency on October 1.

=== Colorado Rockies (second stint) ===
On January 31, 2020, Rosscup signed a minor league contract with the Colorado Rockies organization. Rosscup was released by the Rockies organization on July 1.

=== Sugar Land Lightning Sloths ===
In July 2020, Rosscup signed on to play for the Sugar Land Lightning Sloths of the Constellation Energy League (a makeshift four-team independent league created as a result of the COVID-19 pandemic) for the 2020 season. After logging an 0.71 ERA in 11 games, he was subsequently named to the league's all-star team.

=== Colorado Rockies (third stint) ===
On August 25, 2020, Rosscup signed another minor league contract with the Colorado Rockies organization, who added him to their 60-man player pool. Rosscup did not play in a game in 2020 due to the cancellation of the minor league season because of the COVID-19 pandemic. He became a free agent on November 2.

On December 11, 2020, Rosscup re-signed with the Rockies organization on a new minor league contract. He was assigned to the Triple-A Albuquerque Isotopes to begin the 2021 season and recorded an 0.52 ERA in 17 appearances. On July 16, 2021, Rosscup was selected to the active roster. Rosscup recorded a 3.00 ERA in 4 appearances before being returned to Triple-A Albuquerque on August 5.

=== Houston Astros ===
On March 15, 2022, Rosscup signed a minor league contract with the Houston Astros. In 26 games for the Triple–A Sugar Land Space Cowboys, he registered a 3.10 ERA with 35 strikeouts in 29.0 innings pitched. On August 14, Rosscup was released by the Astros organization.

=== Spire City Ghost Hounds ===
On June 17, 2023, Rosscup signed with the Spire City Ghost Hounds of the Atlantic League of Professional Baseball. In 22 games (10 starts) for the Ghost Hounds, he registered a 4–4 record and 3.31 ERA with 84 strikeouts and 7 saves in 70 2/3 innings pitched. On September 15, Rosscup was released by Spire City.

=== Mumbai Cobras ===
On October 23, 2023, Rosscup was selected in the seventh round by the Mumbai Cobras, with the 51st overall pick, of the 2023 Baseball United inaugural draft.

=== Toros de Tijuana ===
On March 2, 2024, Rosscup signed with the Toros de Tijuana of the Mexican League. In 26 games (1 start) for Tijuana, he compiled a 4–2 record and 4.25 ERA with 41 strikeouts over 36 innings of work. Rosscup was released by the Toros on February 3, 2025.

=== Piratas de Campeche ===
On May 27, 2025, Rosscup signed with the Piratas de Campeche of the Mexican League. Rosscup made 27 appearances for Campeche, logging a 3-1 record and 3.60 ERA with 33 strikeouts and 10 saves across 25 innings of relief.

== Personal ==
Rosscup and his wife have one son.
