= Brandon Guyer =

American baseball player (born 1986)

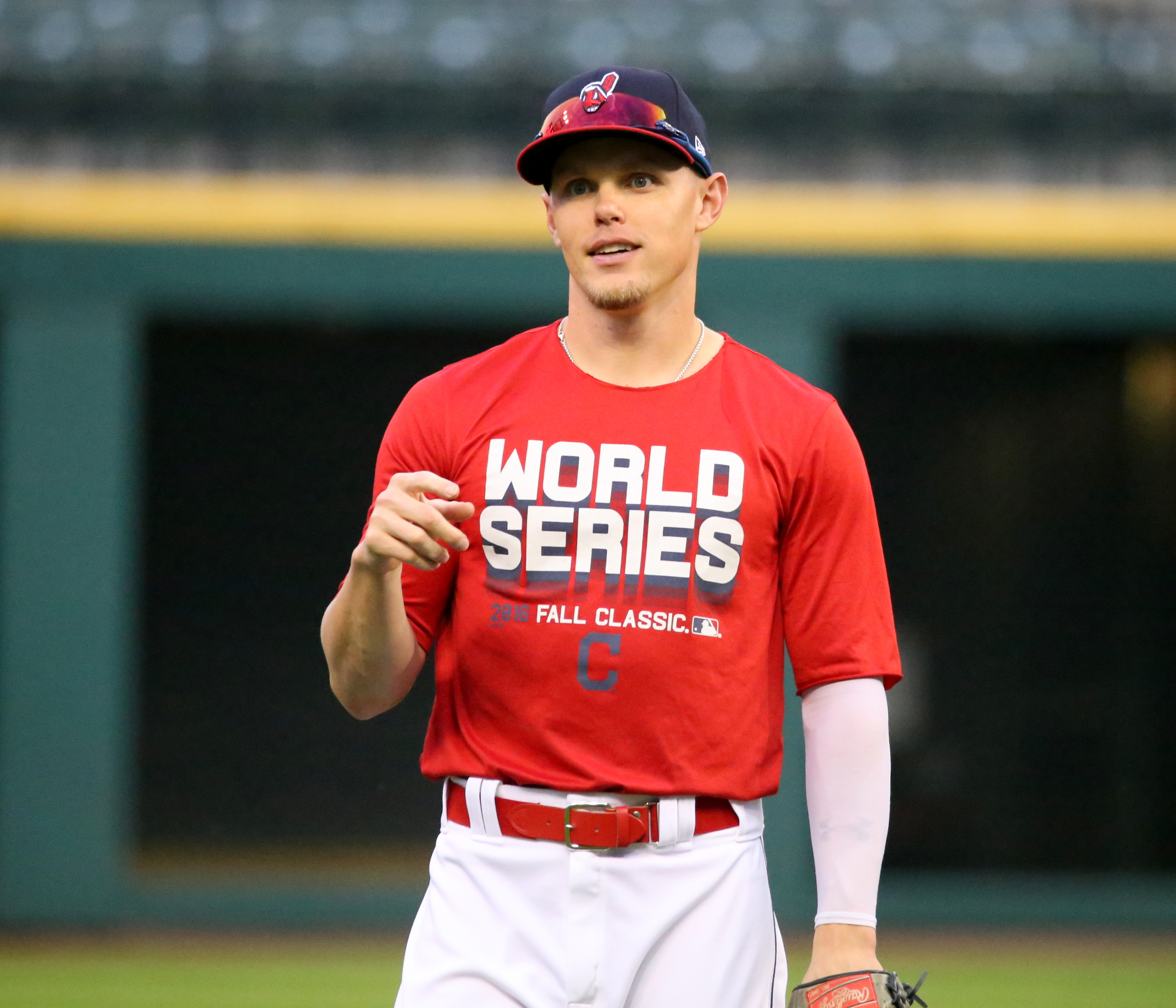
- Guyer with the Cleveland Indians in the 2016 World Series
- Outfielder
- Born: January 28, 1986 (age 40); West Chester, Pennsylvania, U.S.
- Batted: Right Threw: Right

MLB debut
- May 6, 2011, for the Tampa Bay Rays

Last MLB appearance
- September 27, 2018, for the Cleveland Indians

MLB statistics
- Batting average: .250
- Home runs: 32
- Runs batted in: 137
- Stats at Baseball Reference

Teams
- Tampa Bay Rays (2011–2012, 2014–2016); Cleveland Indians (2016–2018)

Career highlights and awards
- Hit a home run in first major league at-bat

Brandon Eric Guyer (born January 28, 1986) is an American former professional baseball outfielder and mental strength coach for the Los Angeles Angels and the University of Virginia Cavaliers Baseball team. He played in Major League Baseball (MLB) for the Tampa Bay Rays and Cleveland Indians. His knack for getting hit by pitches earned him the nickname, "La Piñata."

== Early life and education ==
Guyer was born on January 28, 1986, in West Chester, Pennsylvania. He attended Herndon High School in Herndon, Virginia, where he was a three-year letter winner in baseball as well as football. In football, he rushed for over 1,000 yards as a tailback for the Hornets in both his junior and senior seasons. As a senior, he set the school single-game touchdown record, scoring seven touchdowns during a 285-yard rushing performance on homecoming night (October 4, 2003, Herndon 44, West Potomac 26). Guyer helped Herndon break a six-year Northern Region playoff drought, leading the Hornets to a 7–4 season. He was a third team all-state pick as a junior and a second team all-state pick as a senior. In baseball, Guyer is the Hornets' all-time career home run hitter (13) and holds the single-season home run record with eight. He was a part of the Hornets 19-4 Concorde District championship squad in 2002—the last time Herndon won a district title. As a senior, he had 23 RBI, a .483 batting average and was walked 19 times.

Guyer attended the University of Virginia, and played college baseball for the Virginia Cavaliers baseball team. In 2006, he played collegiate summer baseball with the Harwich Mariners of the Cape Cod Baseball League.

== Professional career ==
=== Chicago Cubs ===
Guyer was drafted by the Chicago Cubs in the 5th round, with the 157th overall selection, of the 2007 Major League Baseball draft.

In 2010, playing for the Chicago Cubs' Double–A affiliate, the Tennessee Smokies of the Southern League, he was second in the league in batting (.344), third in doubles (39) and slugging percentage (.588), tied for seventh in steals (30), and ninth in OBP (.398).

=== Tampa Bay Rays ===
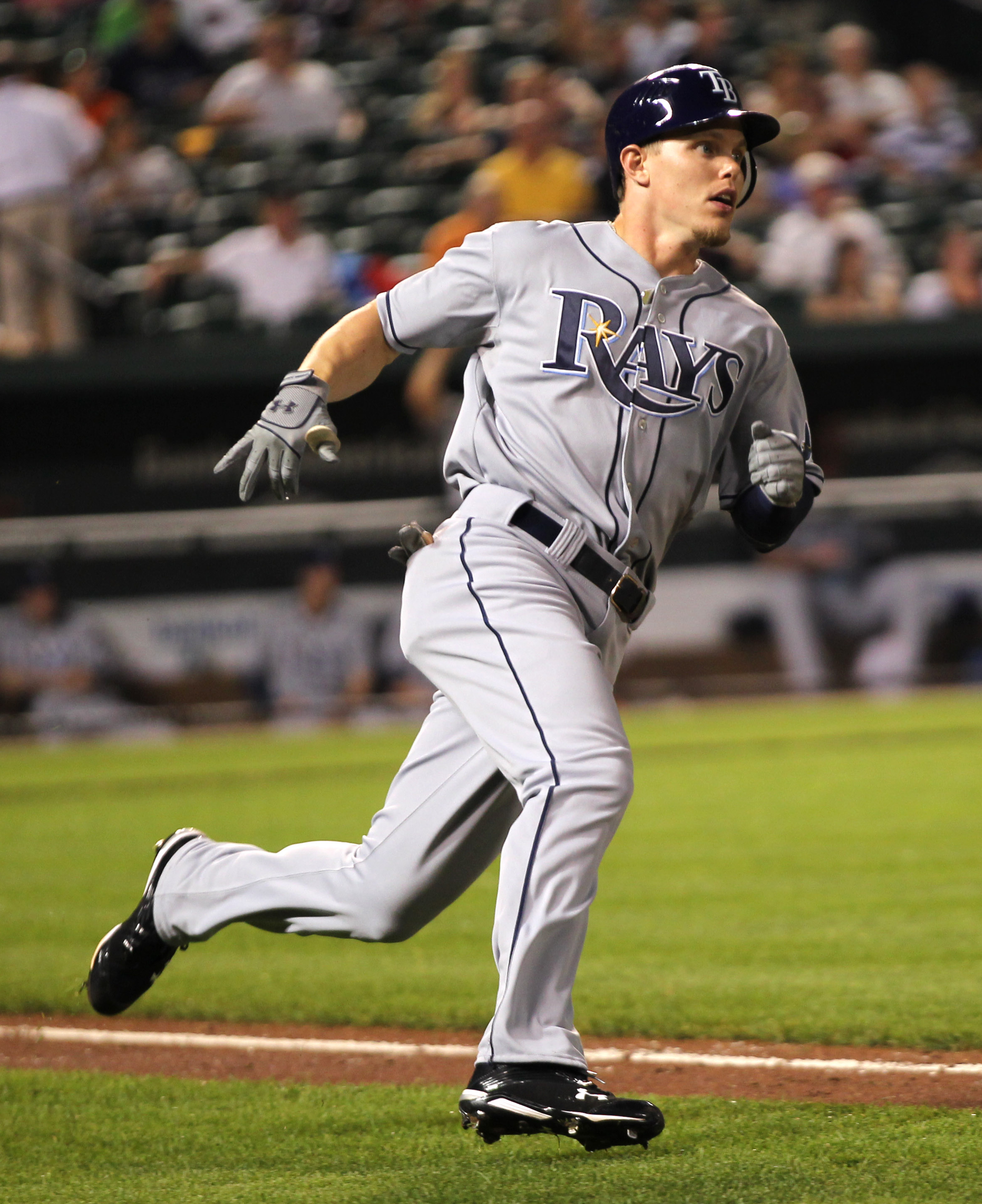
Guyer with the Tampa Bay Rays in 2011

After the 2010 season, the Cubs traded Guyer, Hak-ju Lee, Chris Archer, Robinson Chirinos, and Sam Fuld to the Tampa Bay Rays for Matt Garza, Fernando Perez, and Zac Rosscup.

On May 5, 2011, Guyer was called up to the majors after a successful stint with the Durham Bulls. The next day, in his first major league at bat, he hit a two-run home run off of Baltimore Orioles rookie pitcher Zack Britton. Guyer became the second player in Rays history to hit a home run in his first career at-bat, as well as the first Rays player to hit a home run in his first career at-bat in Camden Yards. On May 8, he was optioned back to Durham, where he batted .312/.384/.521 for the season.

Guyer began the 2012 season with Triple-A Durham, hitting .294 with three home runs and 13 RBIs in 22 games before being recalled to Tampa Bay on May 9 after Jeff Keppinger was placed on the restricted list. Guyer played in three games with Tampa Bay, going 1–for-7 with a home run, before he hit the disabled list with a shoulder strain. On May 25, the Rays announced that Guyer was placed on the injured reserve list after undergoing surgery to repair a torn labrum in his left shoulder.

Guyer returned to the majors in 2014, and was on the Rays roster on Opening Day.

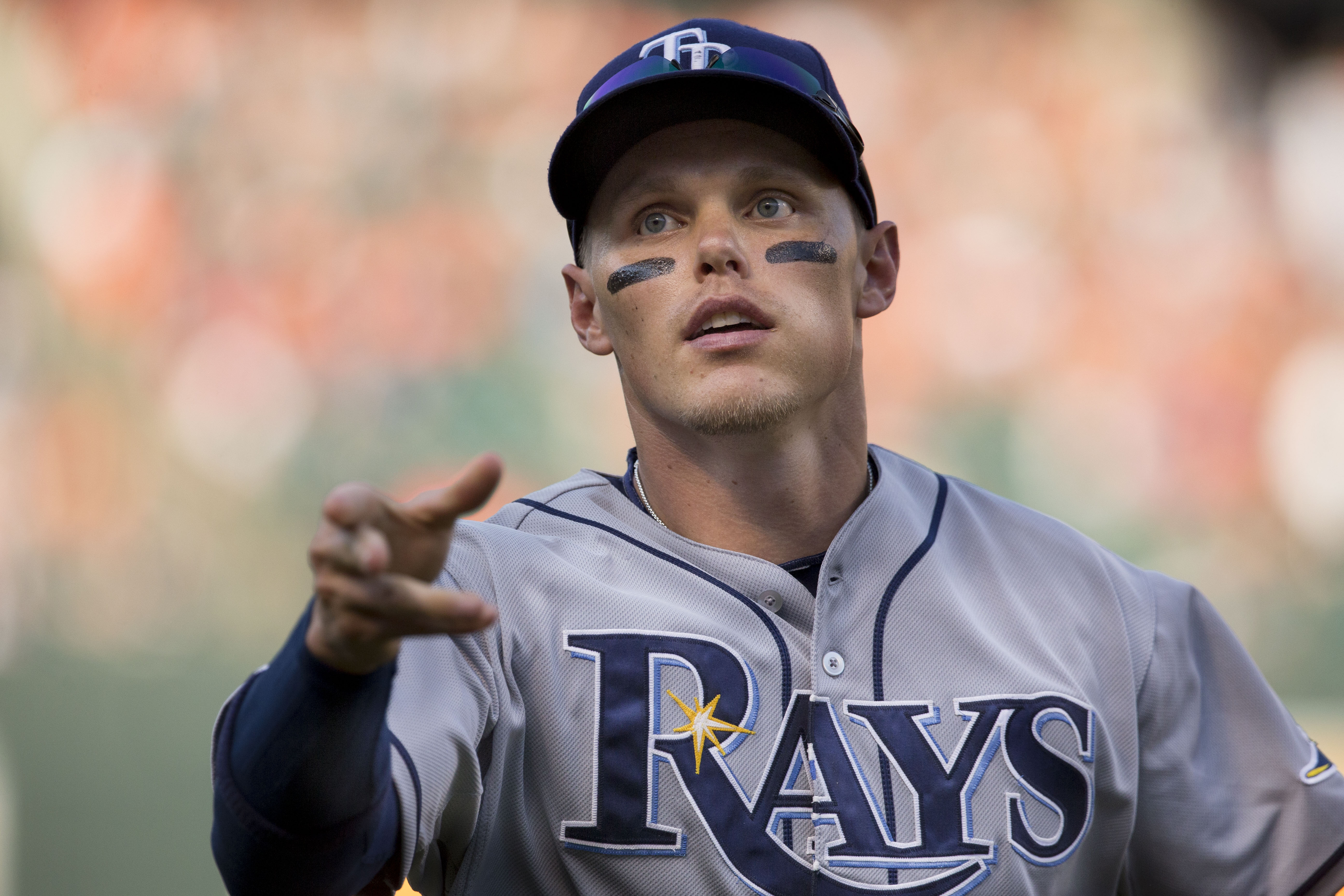
Guyer with the Tampa Bay Rays in 2014

In 2015, Guyer led the American League in being hit by the most pitches, with 24, in 332 at bats. The MLB single-game record for being hit by pitches is three, and Guyer has been the recipient twice: on October 2, 2015, vs. the Mets, and on April 21, 2016, vs. the Red Sox. His knack for getting pegged earned him the nickname, "La Piñata."

=== Cleveland Indians ===
On August 1, 2016, the Rays traded Guyer to the Cleveland Indians in exchange for prospects Nathan Lukes and Jhonleider Salinas. In 2016 he batted .241/.347/.406 in 293 at bats, and led the major leagues in hit by pitch, with 31.

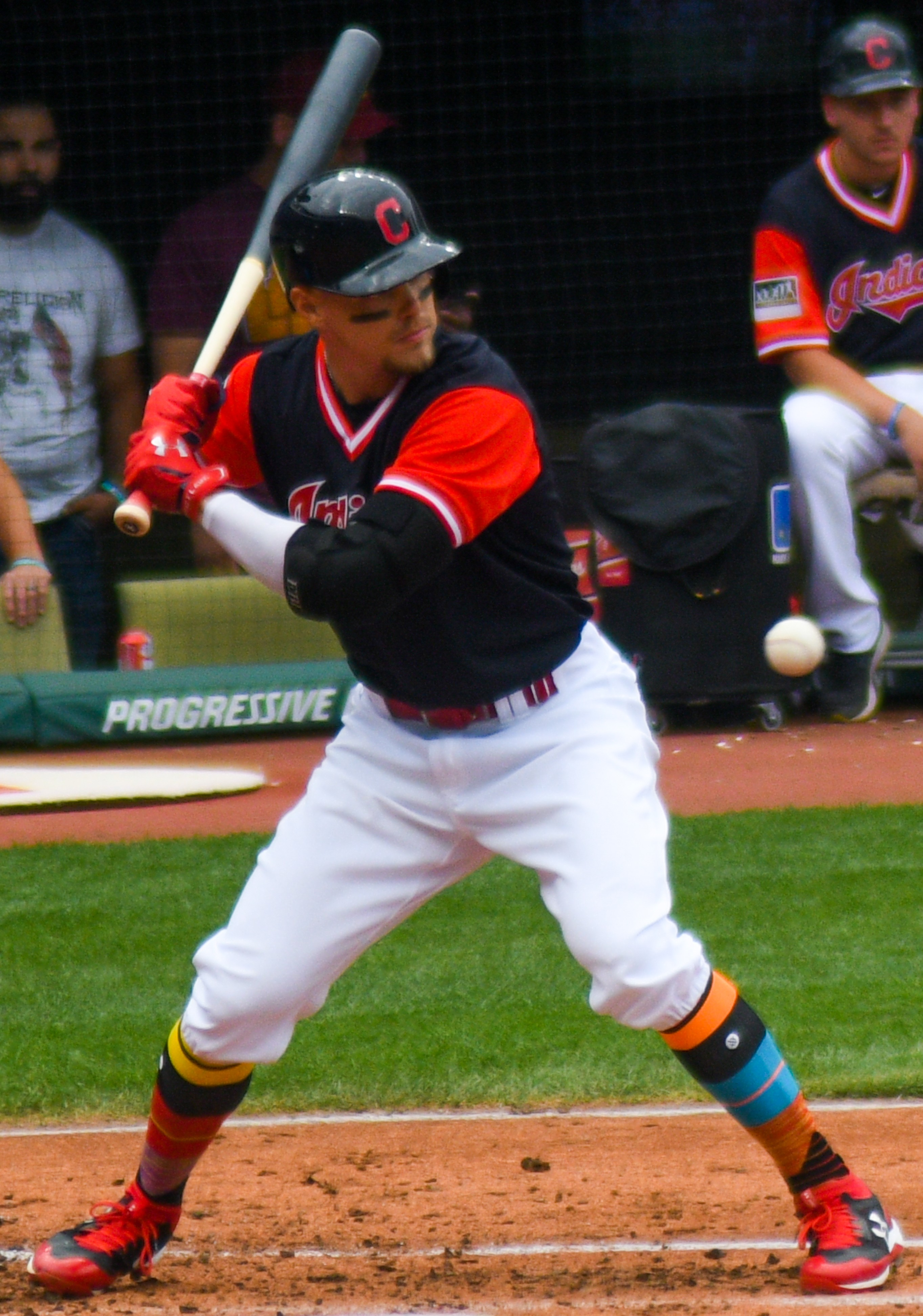
Guyer batting for the Cleveland Indians in 2017

On January 18, 2017, Guyer signed a two-year, $5 million contract with the Indians. The contract also included a $3 million club option for the 2019 season. In 2017, Guyer batted .236/.326/.327 in 165 at bats. In 2018, Guyer batted .206/.300/.371 in 194 at bats.

The Indians bought out Guyer's contact for 2019, making him a free agent, on October 30, 2018.

=== Chicago White Sox ===
On February 5, 2019, Guyer signed a minor league contract with the Chicago White Sox. He was released on March 23. On March 26, he re-signed with the White Sox. In 16 games for the Triple–A Charlotte Knights, he batted .244/.367/.366 with no home runs and 6 RBI. He became a free agent following the season on November 4.

On February 3, 2020, Guyer signed a minor league contract with the San Francisco Giants. The Giants released him in March. Guyer subsequently announced his retirement on July 6.

== Coaching career ==
On February 23, 2023, the Los Angeles Angels hired Guyer as a mental strength coaching consultant.

== Personal life ==
Guyer was included as a defendant in a $5 million lawsuit filed in April 2012 with fellow Rays prospect, Matt Bush. The lawsuit was based on Bush being involved in an accident while driving Guyer's Dodge Durango; the lawsuit was settled in 2013.

Guyer and his wife, Lindsay, have three children.

== See also ==
- List of Major League Baseball players with a home run in their first major league at bat
