= Hak-ju Lee =

South Korean baseball player (born 1990)

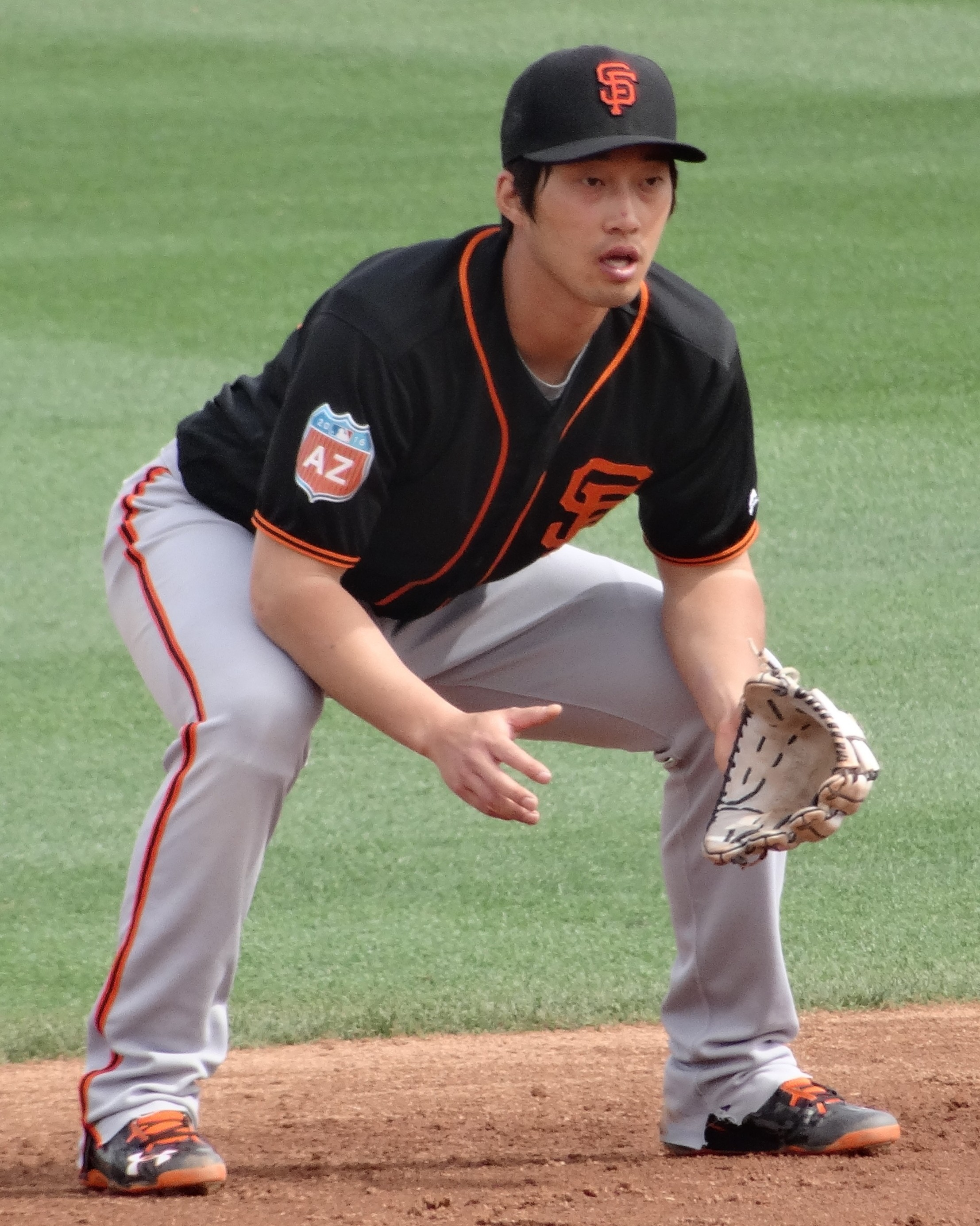
- Lee with the San Francisco Giants in 2016

Lotte Giants – No. 6
- Shortstop
- Born: November 4, 1990 (age 36); Jeju, South Korea
- Bats: Left Throws: Right

KBO debut
- March 23, 2019, for the Samsung Lions

KBO statistics (through 2024 season)
- Batting average: .233
- Home runs: 23
- Runs batted in: 116
- Stolen bases: 29
- Stats at Baseball Reference

Teams
- Samsung Lions (2019–2021); Lotte Giants (2022–present)
Korean name
Hangul	이학주
Hanja	李學周
RR	I Hakju
MR	I Hakchu

Hak-ju Lee (Korean: 이학주; Hanja: 李學周; born November 4, 1990) is a South Korean professional baseball shortstop for the Lotte Giants of the KBO League. He signed with the Chicago Cubs as an international free agent in 2008. He has previously played in the KBO League for the Samsung Lions.

== Career ==
=== Chicago Cubs ===
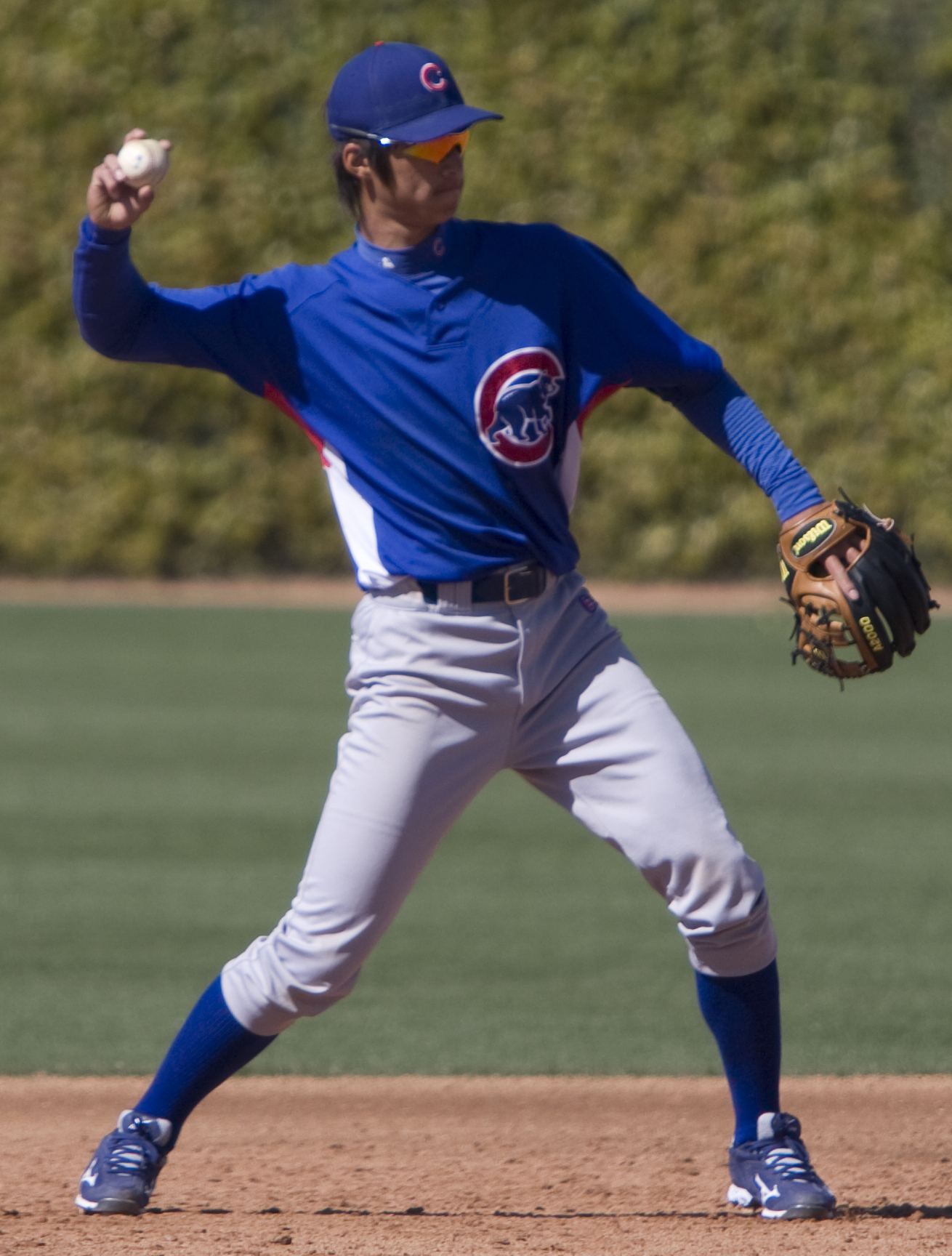
Lee with the Chicago Cubs in 2010

Lee was signed out of South Korea by the Chicago Cubs in May 2008 at age 17, receiving a signing bonus of $1.15 million. He made his debut in the Cubs system for the Low-A Boise Hawks in 2009 after recovering from Tommy John surgery. He batted .330/.399/.420 with 2 home runs and 33 RBI in 68 games for Boise.

Lee played for the World team in the 2010 All-Star Futures Game, going 1-for-2 with a single, and making a fielding error. He spent the 2010 season with the Single-A Peoria Chiefs, posting a .282/.354/.351 batting line with 1 home run and 40 RBI. He was ranked by Baseball America as the fourth-best prospect in the Cubs' system going into 2011.

=== Tampa Bay Rays ===
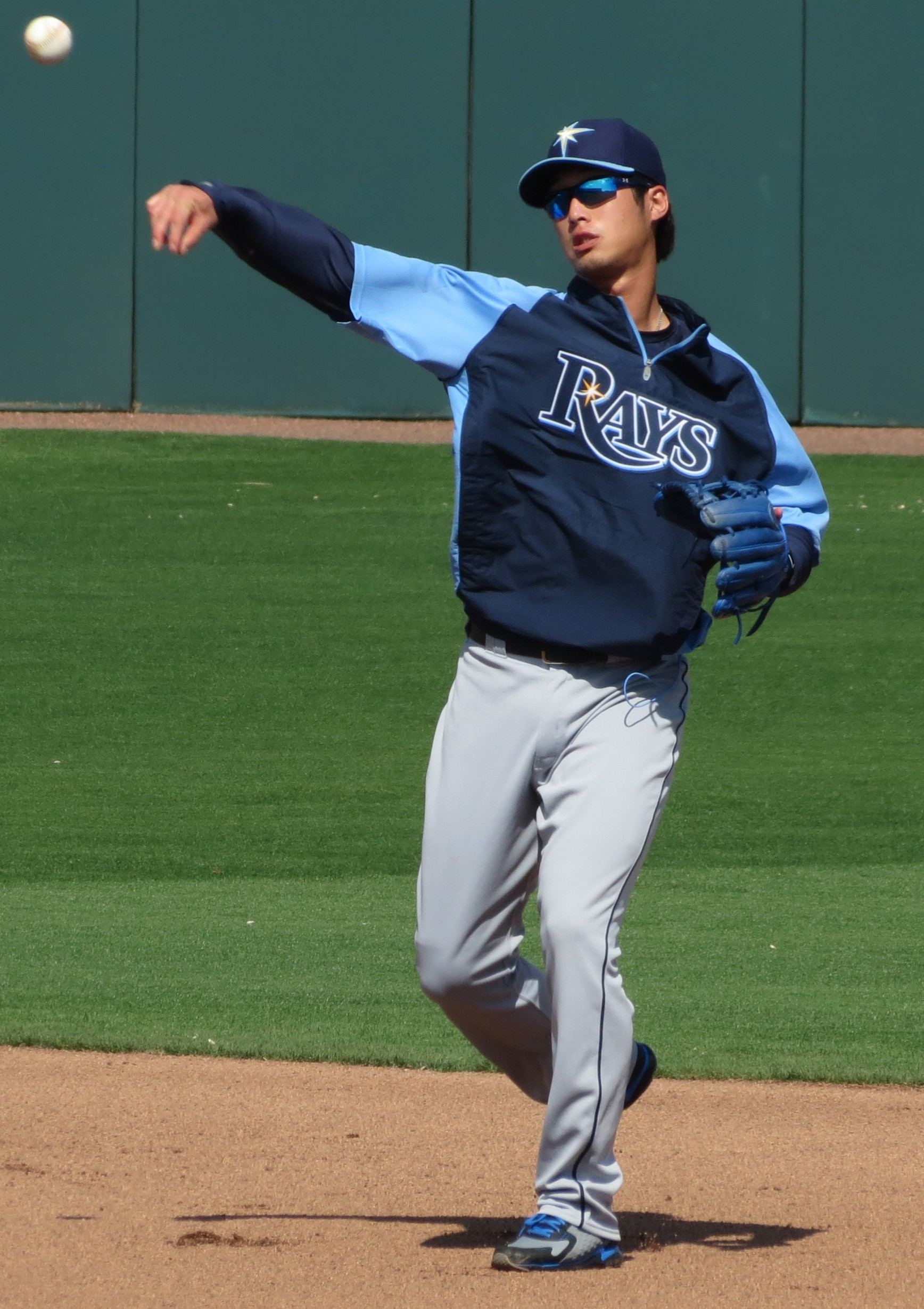
Lee with the Tampa Bay Rays in 2013

On January 7, 2011, Lee was traded to the Tampa Bay Rays along with fellow prospects Chris Archer, Brandon Guyer, Robinson Chirinos and Cubs outfielder Sam Fuld for pitcher Matt Garza, outfielder Fernando Perez and minor league pitcher Zac Rosscup.

Lee started the 2011 season with the High-A Charlotte Stone Crabs, leading the team in AVG (.318) and SLG (.443), and earned a mid-season promotion to the Double-A Montgomery Biscuits, where he went 19-for-100 in 24 games. He was caught stealing five times while playing in the Arizona Fall League, where his batting average was .247. Lee played for the World team for the second time in the 2011 All-Star Futures Game, going 0–2 with a strikeout. When the 2011 season was over, Lee and second baseman Tyler Bortnick were named Florida State League all-stars. He spent the 2012 season with Montgomery, hitting .261/.336/.360 with 4 home runs and 37 RBI in 116 games. On November 20, 2012, Lee was selected to the 40-man roster.

Lee was optioned to the Triple-A Durham Bulls on March 15, 2013. In late April 2013, he tore multiple knee ligaments in a collision at second base and missed the remainder of the season. Lee was optioned to Triple-A Durham on March 13, 2014, and placed on the disabled list on March 30. He was activated on April 22 and spent the remainder of the year with the team, posting a .203/.287/.276 slash line with 4 home runs and 23 RBI. He was assigned to Durham to begin the season, and spent the year with the team, batting .220/.303/.304 with 3 home runs and 27 RBI. The Rays designated Lee for assignment on September 1, 2015. He was outrighted to Durham 3 days later and elected free agency on November 7, 2015.

=== San Francisco Giants ===
On November 18, 2015, Lee signed a minor league contract with the San Francisco Giants organization that included an invitation to Spring Training. He did not make the club and was assigned to the Triple-A Sacramento River Cats to begin the season. Lee logged a .265/.344/.377 batting line with Sacramento before exercising a June 1 opt-out clause in his deal and electing free agency.

=== Samsung Lions ===
Lee became eligible for the 2019 KBO Draft, as those who debuted in minor league baseball after 2008 have to wait 2 years after released by their MLB team to be eligible for the KBO draft. Lee was picked #2 by the Samsung Lions, behind top pick Rhee Dae-eun who was also a former Chicago Cubs prospect, on September 10, 2018 in the 2019 KBO Draft. At the time of the draft, Lee had accumulated 23 homers, 209 RBIs, 169 steals and averaged .269 in 678 games from his eight seasons in the minor leagues with the Cubs, Rays, and Giants organizations. In 2019 with Samsung, Lee posted a .262/.332/.369 slash line with 7 home runs and 36 RBI in 118 games. He played in 64 games in 2020, batting .228/.314/.340 with 4 home runs and 28 RBI.

=== Lotte Giants ===
On January 24, 2022, Lee was traded to the Lotte Giants in exchange for a Ha-Neul Choi and a 2023 3rd-round pick.

== Personal life ==
When he came to America, he fell in love with the culture, especially with American-Korean restaurants. He said he was in need of a translator and that he would like to try North Carolina style barbecue some day. Lee was charged with a DUI in May 2017 when he was without a club and has expressed regrets for his misconduct.
