= Robinson Chirinos =

Venezuelan baseball player (born 1984)

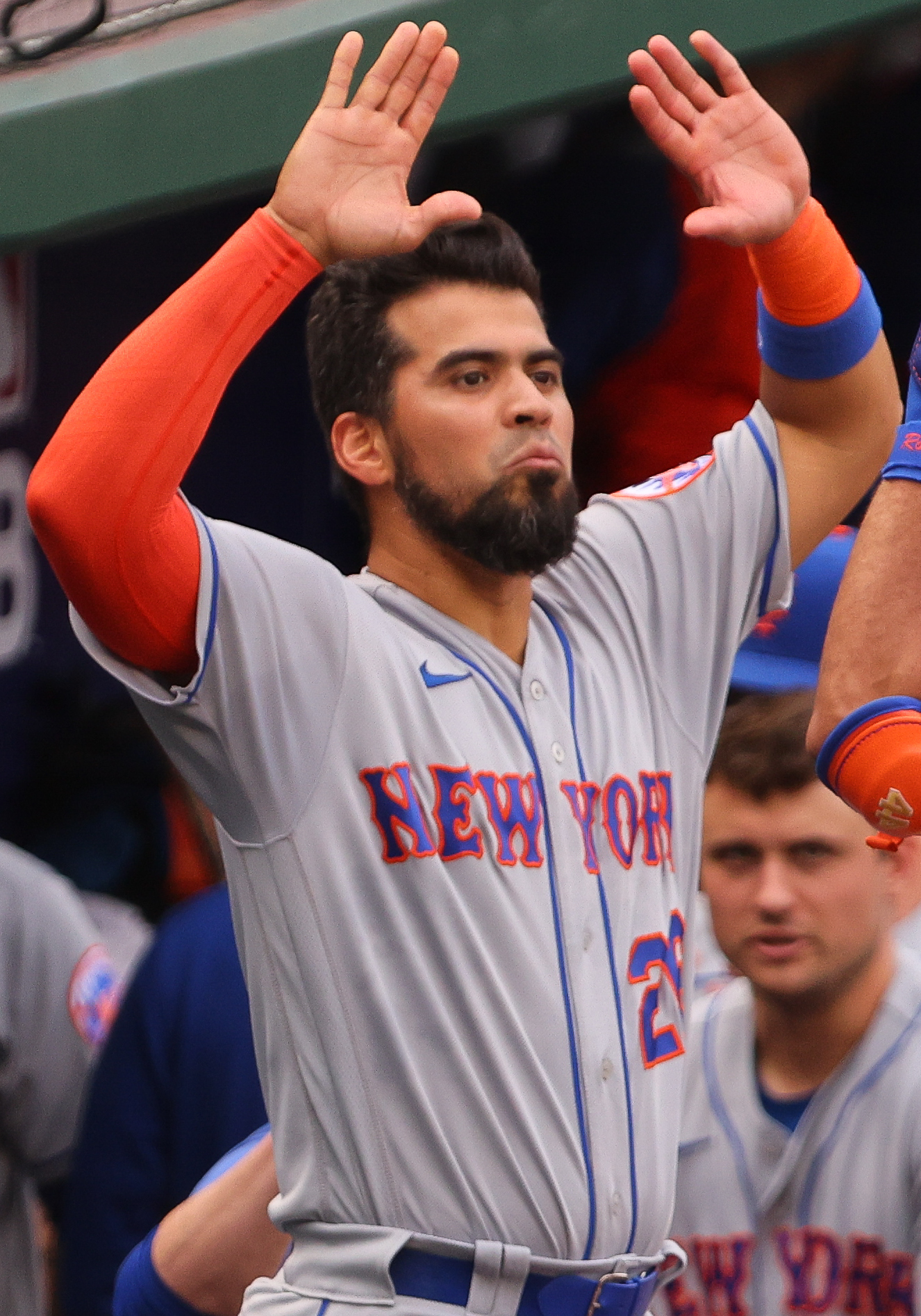
- Chirinos with the New York Mets in 2020
- Catcher
- Born: June 5, 1984 (age 42); Punto Fijo, Venezuela
- Batted: Right Threw: Right

MLB debut
- July 18, 2011, for the Tampa Bay Rays

Last MLB appearance
- October 5, 2022, for the Baltimore Orioles

MLB statistics
- Batting average: .226
- Home runs: 95
- Runs batted in: 306
- Stats at Baseball Reference

Teams
- Tampa Bay Rays (2011); Texas Rangers (2013–2018); Houston Astros (2019); Texas Rangers (2020); New York Mets (2020); Chicago Cubs (2021); Baltimore Orioles (2022)

Robinson David Chirinos González (Spanish pronunciation: [ˈroβinson tʃiˈɾinos]; born June 5, 1984) is a Venezuelan former professional baseball catcher who played in Major League Baseball (MLB) for the Tampa Bay Rays, Texas Rangers, Houston Astros, New York Mets, Chicago Cubs, and Baltimore Orioles. He signed with the Cubs as an undrafted free agent out of Venezuela in 2000.

== Playing career ==
=== Chicago Cubs ===
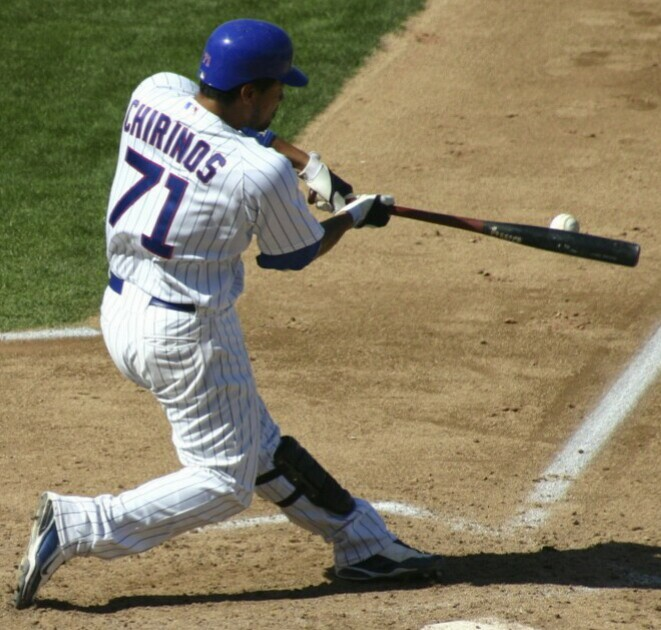
Chirinos batting for the Chicago Cubs in 2010 spring training

Chirinos signed with the Chicago Cubs as an undrafted free agent out of Venezuela on July 2, 2000. Chirinos made his professional debut with the AZL Cubs in 2001. In 2002, Chirinos played for the Low-A Boise Hawks, where he batted .247/.311/.433 with 8 home runs and 38 RBI. He played for the Single-A Lansing Lugnuts in 2003 and 2004, hitting .232 and .241 respectively, also logging 7 home runs and 39 RBI both seasons. In 2005, Chirinos played for the High-A Daytona Cubs, logging a .273/.327/.392 slash line with 7 home runs and 27 RBI. The following season, Chirinos played for the Single-A Peoria Chiefs, posting a .242/.360/.383 batting line with career-highs in home runs (9) and RBI (47). For the 2007 season, Chirinos split the year between the Double-A Tennessee Smokies and Daytona, and hit a cumulative .246/.357/.358 in 121 games between the two teams. The next season, Chirinos played for Tennessee, Daytona, and the AZL Cubs, accumulating a .275/.394/.441 slash line with 5 home runs and 29 RBI between the three teams. In 2009, Chirinos split the season between Tennessee and Daytona, posting a .294/.396/.519 slash with new career-highs in home runs (11) and RBI (52). In 2010, Chirinos split the year between Tennessee and the Triple-A Iowa Cubs, hitting a cumulative .326/.416/.583 with even newer career-highs in home runs (18) and RBI (74).

Following the 2010 season, Chirinos was added to the Cubs' 40-man roster.

=== Tampa Bay Rays ===
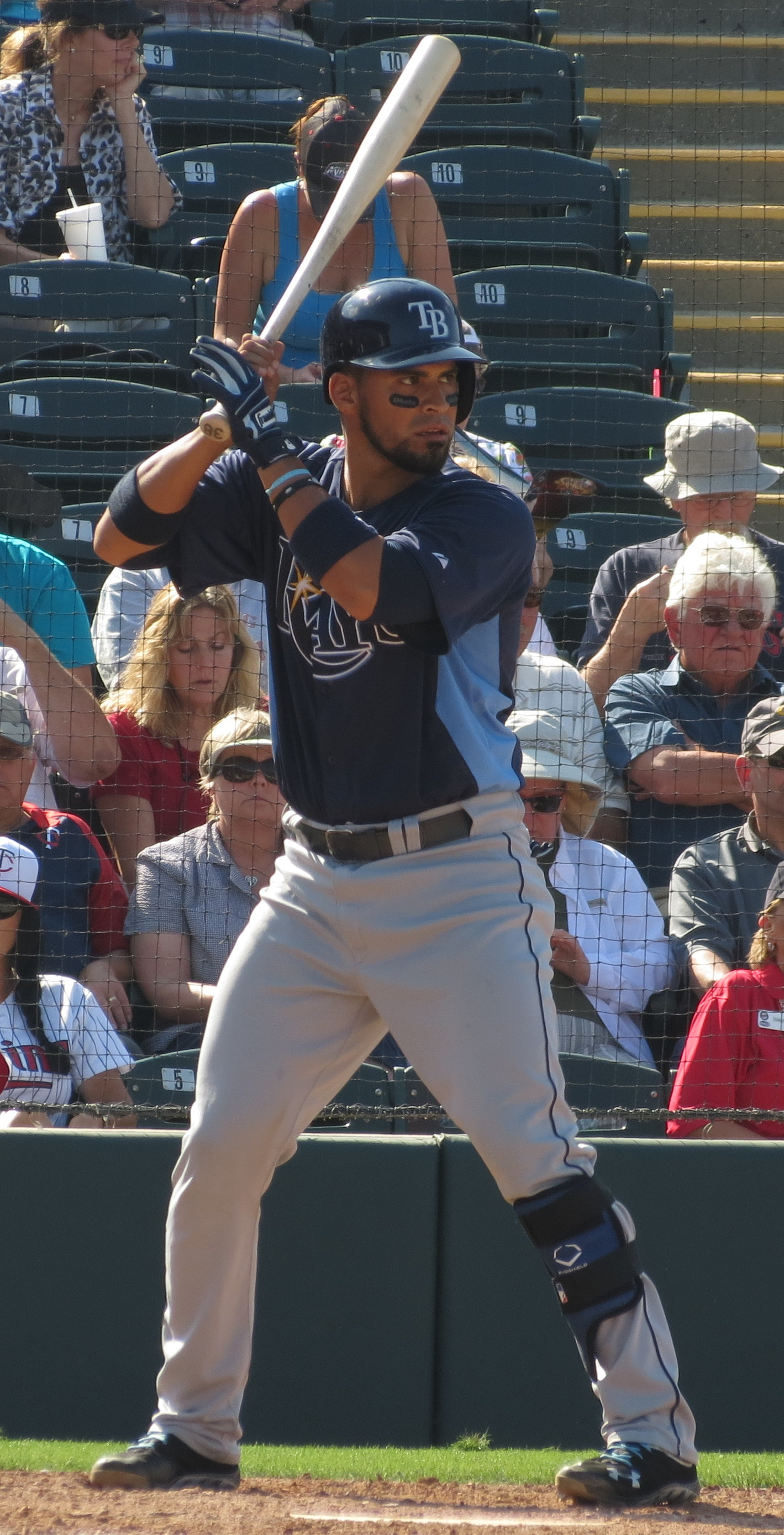
Chirinos with the Rays in 2013

On January 8, 2011, Chirinos was traded to the Tampa Bay Rays alongside Sam Fuld, Hak-Ju Lee, Brandon Guyer, and Chris Archer in exchange for Matt Garza, Fernando Perez, and Zac Rosscup.

Chirinos was promoted to the majors for the first time on July 18, 2011, by the Rays. He doubled in his first major-league at bat against A. J. Burnett of the New York Yankees. Chirinos hit his first MLB home run on August 3 against the Toronto Blue Jays. He also recorded his first career RBI earlier in the same game. In his rookie season, Chirinos batted .218/.283/.309. That season Chirinos allowed 21 stolen bases, as he caught 2 runners, for a caught-stealing percentage of 9%. Chirinos had an opportunity to make the big league club in 2012 out of spring training, but he suffered a concussion which prevented him from playing any baseball during the 2012 season. He was designated for assignment on March 31, 2013.

=== Texas Rangers ===
==== 2013 ====
On April 8, 2013, Chirinos was traded to the Texas Rangers in exchange for a player to be named later. He had a very limited role behind A. J. Pierzynski as the backup, as he only played in 13 games batting .179/.233/.286 in 28 at-bats.

==== 2014 ====
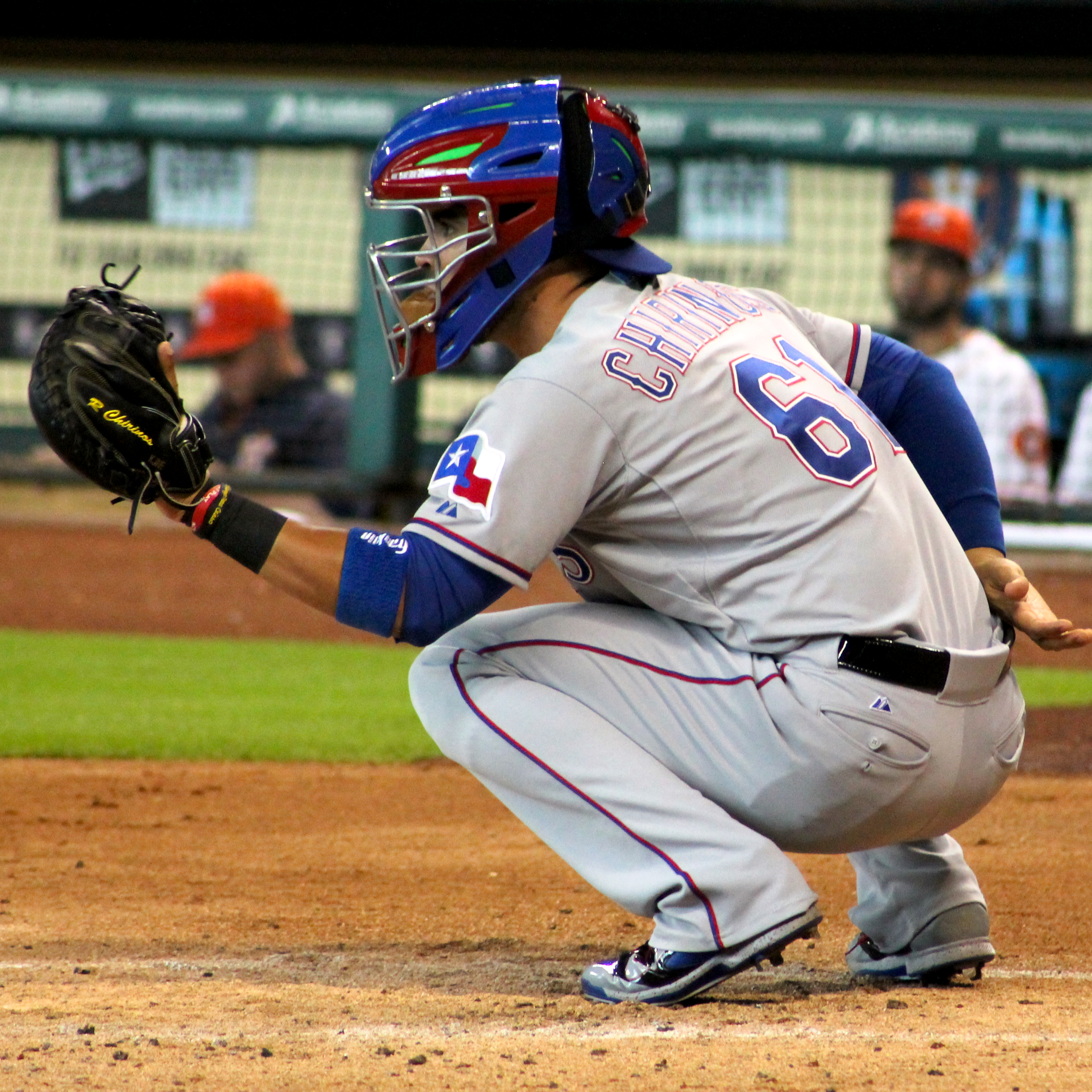
Chirinos catching for the Rangers in 2014

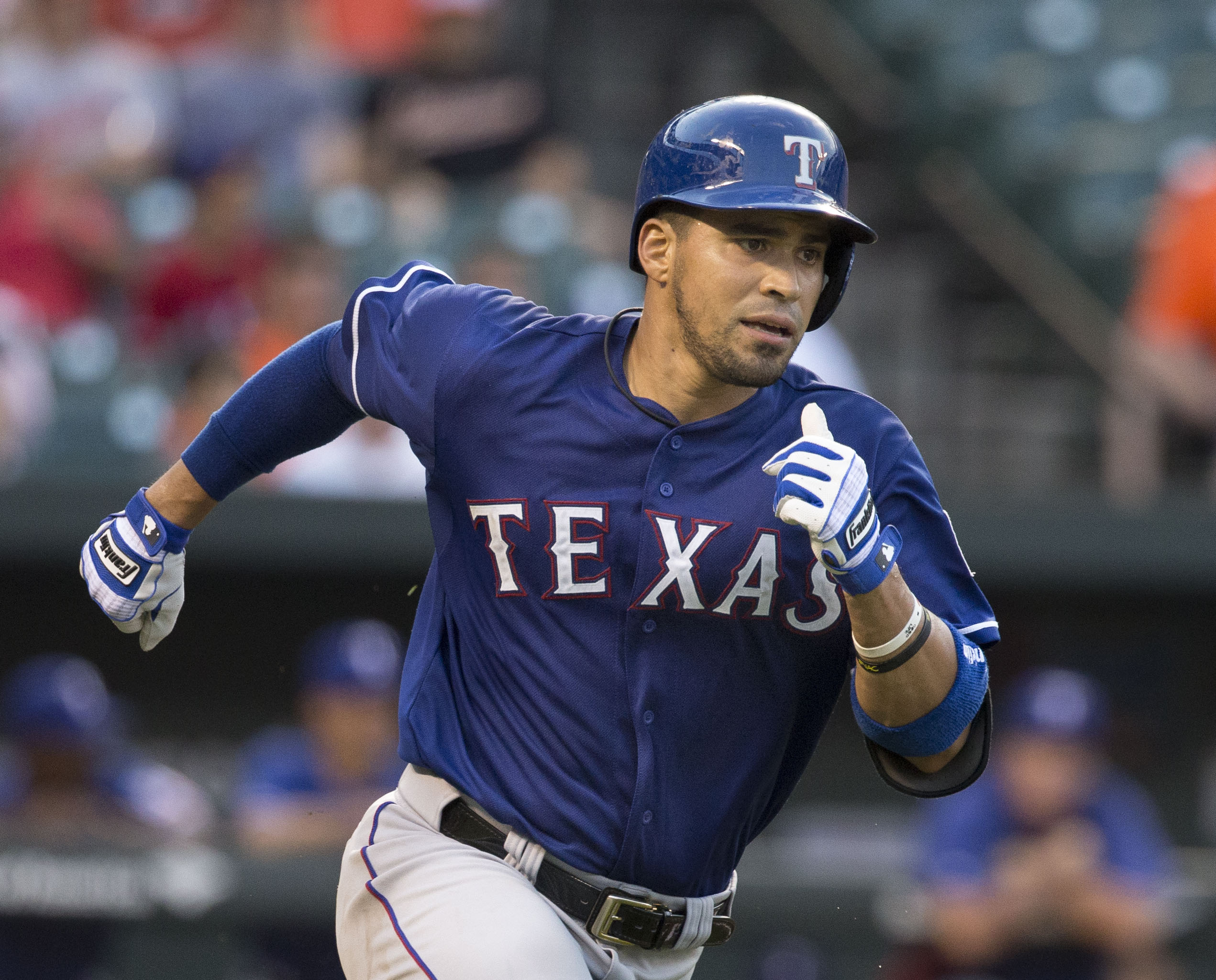
Chirinos rounds the bases during a game in 2014

Chirinos got his chance to start for the Rangers in 2014, playing in a career-high 93 games. He had many more career-highs in 2014 as well, with 13 home runs, 40 RBIs, and batting .239/.290/.415. He made six errors, third-most for a catcher in the AL.

==== 2015 ====
Chirinos started for the Rangers again in 2015 and batted .232/.325/.438 in 78 games. In the ALDS against the Toronto Blue Jays, Chirinos went 3-for-11 (.273) with one home run in 3 games played in a series loss.

==== 2016 ====
In 2016, he batted .224/.314/.483 with 9 home runs and 20 RBI in 57 games. That season Chirinos allowed 22 stolen bases, as he caught 8 runners, for a caught-stealing percentage of 27%.

==== 2017 ====
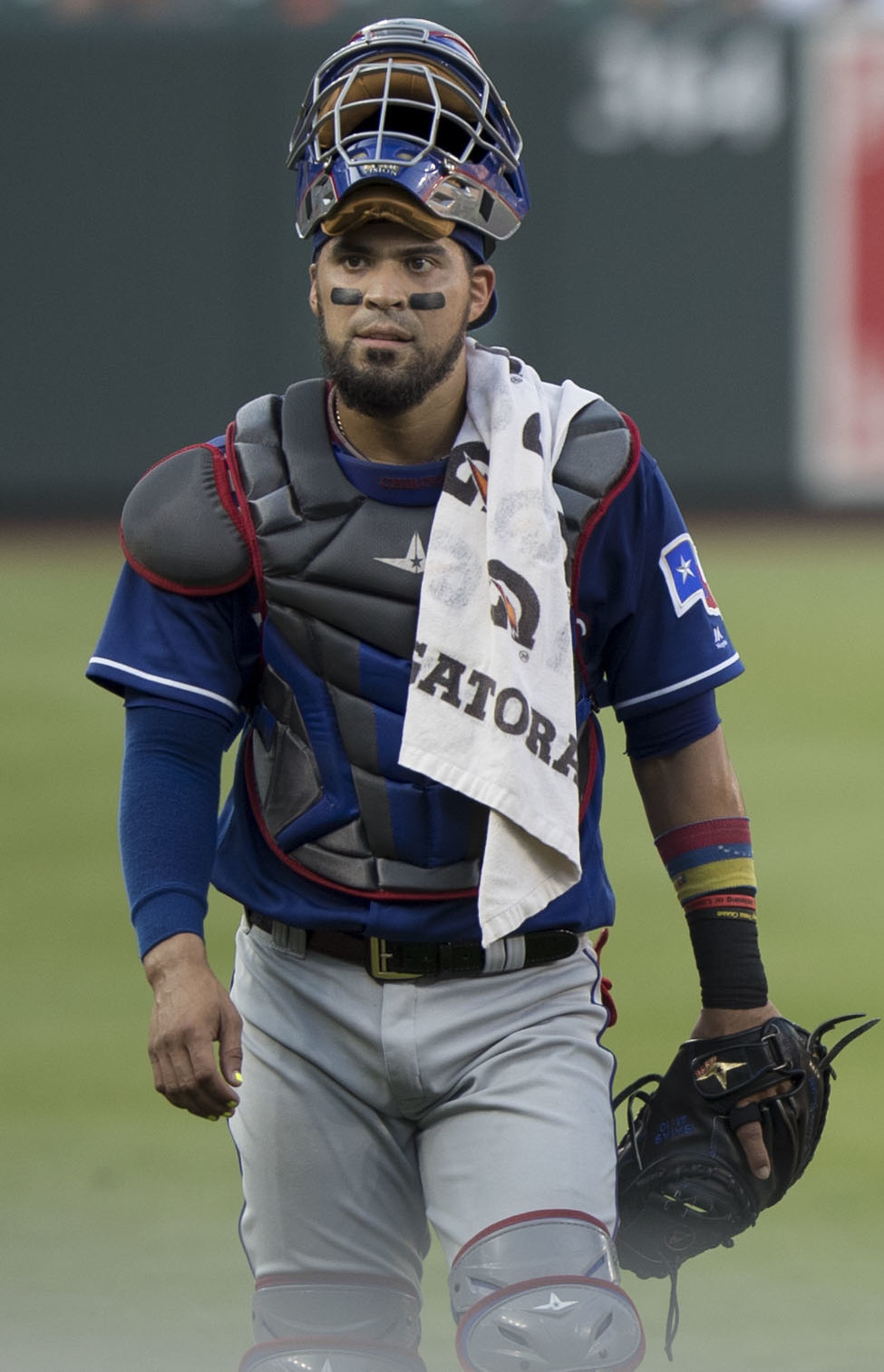
Chirinos in 2017

In 2017, Chirinos allowed 46 stolen bases, as he caught 15 runners, for a caught-stealing percentage of 25%. He also slashed .255/.360/.506 with 17 home runs and 38 RBI in 88 games.

==== 2018 ====
On June 13, 2018, Chirinos was struck by Matt Kemp during a home-plate collision. Chirinos, thinking that the collision was intentional, scolded Kemp for colliding into him, and the two fought, leading to the benches clearing. Both combatants were ejected and the Rangers lost against the Dodgers 3–2 in 11 innings.

In 2018, he batted .222/.338/.419 with 18 home runs and 65 RBI in 113 games. Chirinos allowed 53 stolen bases, fourth-most for a catcher in the AL, as he caught 6 runners, for a caught-stealing percentage of 10%. The Rangers declined his $4.5 million option for 2019, and he became a free agent.

=== Houston Astros ===
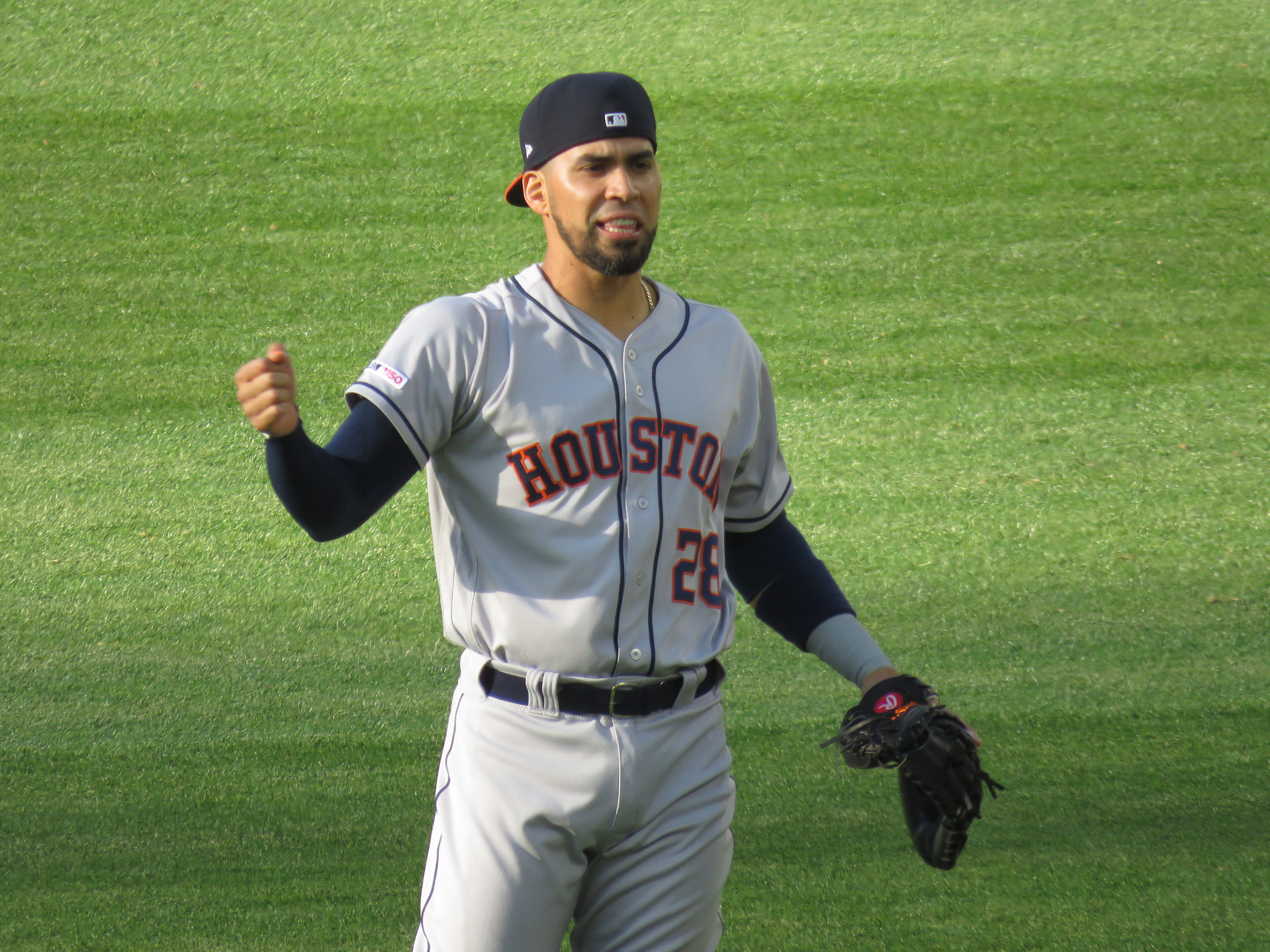
Chirinos with the Astros in 2019

On December 6, 2018, Chirinos signed a one-year contract with the Houston Astros. Needing a triple to complete hitting for the cycle on August 21, 2019, Chirinos lined a double to right-center field but was thrown out attempting to reach third base and end the game. Meanwhile, his batterymate, Justin Verlander became the first pitcher to lose a nine-inning complete game without throwing a single pitch with a runner on base. (Note: Two other such games preceded this that lasted fewer than nine innings: July 30, 1971, Dick Drago (four innings) and on May 31, 2007, Mark Buehrle (eight). Criteria: For single games, pitcher lost, in complete games, in the regular season, requiring baserunners allowed = 1.0 × home runs allowed, sorted by descending date.)

Ten days later, on September 1, 2019, Chirinos caught Verlander's third career no-hitter. He caught a bid for another no-hitter on September 25, 2019, by Zack Greinke, that lasted 8 1/3 innings until Austin Nola's single to left-center field. The no-hit bid capped a team record-setting 104th win.

With the Astros in 2019, Chirinos batted .238/.347/.443, with 17 home runs and 58 RBI. He caught in the starting lineup for 106 games that year.

=== Texas Rangers (second stint) ===
On January 15, 2020, Chirinos signed a one-year contract with the Texas Rangers (with a team option for 2021). In 14 games with Texas, Chirinos batted .119/.224/.143 with 2 RBI.

=== New York Mets ===
On August 31, 2020, the Rangers traded Chirinos to the New York Mets for a player to be named later. He finished the year batting .219/.242/.375 in 12 games for the Mets.

=== New York Yankees ===
On February 15, 2021, Chirinos signed a minor league contract with New York Yankees organization that included an invitation to Spring Training. On March 10, 2021, in a game against the Pittsburgh Pirates, Chirinos was hit in the hands by a Blake Cederlind pitch and was later diagnosed with a fractured right wrist. On March 15, Yankees manager Aaron Boone told reporters that Chirinos would undergo surgery the next day on his broken wrist and miss four to six weeks. On March 27, 2021, Chirinos was released from his minor league contract, making him a free agent. On March 29, Chirinos re-signed with the Yankees on a new minor league contract. Chirinos batted .278/.422/.556 with 3 home runs and 6 RBI in 13 games with the Triple-A Scranton/Wilkes-Barre Railriders. On July 4, Chirinos was released by the Yankees organization.

=== Chicago Cubs (second stint) ===
On July 5, 2021, Chirinos signed a major league contract with the Chicago Cubs. On July 6, Robinson Chirinos hit his first home run with the Chicago Cubs against the Philadelphia Phillies.

=== Baltimore Orioles ===
On March 14, 2022, Chirinos signed a one-year contract with the Baltimore Orioles. He played in 67 games for Baltimore, slashing .179/.265/.287 with 4 home runs and 22 RBI.

On May 3, 2023, Chirinos announced his retirement from professional baseball.

== International career ==
Chirinos played for the Venezuela national team during the 2017 World Baseball Classic (WBC), batting .214.

In October 2018 he was selected an MLB All-Star for the 2018 MLB Japan All-Star Series.

Chirinos served as the bench coach for Venezuela during the 2026 WBC, where the team won its first title. Later in 2026, Chiironos became an inductee into the Venezuelan Baseball Hall of Fame and Museum as a member of the WBC championship team.

== Coaching career ==
On November 25, 2024, the Baltimore Orioles announced that Chirinos would serve as their bench coach for the 2025 season. On October 31, 2025, it was announced that the Orioles would not retain Chirinos for the 2026 season. On February 17, 2026, the Orioles announced that Chirinos would return as a special assistant for baseball operations and player development.

== See also ==
- List of Houston Astros no-hitters
- List of Major League Baseball players from Venezuela
