= Abreu (surname) =

Origin
- Region of origin: Minho Province, (today Alto Minho) Portugal

Abreu is a Portuguese-Galician surname.

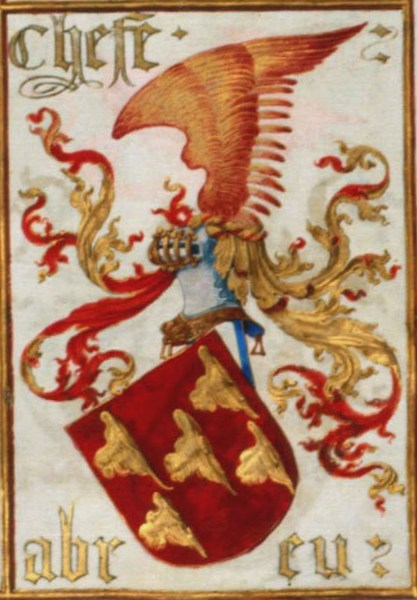
the Abreu coat of arms

The source of the name is debated. The family name has a Portuguese form, and has been explained as being an ancient branch of the house of Normandy via the Countship of Évreux, France. It has also been linked to the name Abraham (Portuguese Abraão), the Biblical figure. Some (reference needed) argue that it is an abbreviation of the Portuguese phrase "Abraham the Hebrew" (Portuguese Abraão O Hebreu).

Prominent people with the surname are:

- Abner Abreu (born 1989), Dominican baseball player
- Abraham Abreu (born 1939), Venezuelan harpsichordist
- Albert Abreu (born 1995), Dominican baseball player
- Alcinda Abreu (born 1953), Mozambican politician
- Aldo Abreu, Venezuelan recorder player
- Aleixo de Abreu (1568–1630), Portuguese physician and tropical pathologist
- Alex Abreu Vásquez (born 1991), Puerto Rican basketball player
- Anderson Luís de Abreu Oliveira (born 1988), Brazilian footballer
- Andrea Abreu (born 1995), Canarian writer.
- Anna Abreu (born 1990), Finnish-Portuguese singer
- António de Abreu (c. 1480 – c. 1514), Portuguese navigator and naval officer
- António Caetano de Abreu Freire Egas Moniz (1874–1955), Portuguese psychiatrist, neurosurgeon, and Nobel Prize winner
- António Simões de Abreu (born 1947), Portuguese engineer and politician
- Artur Abreu (born 1994), Portuguese-Luxembourgish footballer
- Aryam Abreu Delgado (born 1978), Cuban chess grandmaster
- Átila Abreu (born 1987), Brazilian racing driver
- Bobby Abreu (born 1974), Venezuelan baseball player
- Bryan Abreu (born 1997), Dominican baseball player
- Caio Fernando Abreu (1948–1996), Brazilian journalist and writer
- Carlos Renato de Abreu (born 1978), Brazilian footballer
- Casimiro de Abreu (1829–1860), Brazilian writer
- Charles Abreu (1919–1994), Cuban composer and pianist
- Cláudia Abreu (born 1970), Brazilian actress
- Diogo Abreu (born 1947), Portuguese geographer
- Diogo Abreu (born 2003), Portuguese footballer
- Edgar Abreu (born 1994), Portuguese footballer
- Ermilo Abreu Gómez (1894–1971), Mexican writer
- Eufemio Abreu (1901–?), Cuban baseball player
- Fernanda Abreu (born 1961), Brazilian singer
- Fernando Abreu (born 1984), Brazilian footballer
- Florêncio Carlos de Abreu e Silva (1839–1881), Brazilian lawyer, journalist, writer, and politician
- Francisco Abreu (born 1943), Spanish golfer
- George Leandro Abreu de Lima (born 1985), Brazilian footballer
- Gilda de Abreu (1904–1979), Brazilian actress, singer, writer and film director
- Gonçalo Abreu (born 1986), Portuguese footballer
- José Inácio Ribeiro de Abreu e Lima, (1768–1817) priest and lawyer killed for his involvement with the Pernambucan revolution
- Jesus Gil Abreu (1823–1900), American rancher and pioneer
- Joe Abreu (1913–1993), American baseball player
- José Abreu (1688–1756), Spanish administrator
- José Abreu (1910–unknown), Cuban baseball player
- José Abreu (baseball) (born 1987), Cuban baseball player
- José Antonio Abreu (1939–2018), Venezuelan pianist, economist, educator, activist and politician
- José de Abreu (politician) (1944–2022), Brazilian politician
- José de Abreu (born 1946), Brazilian actor
- Juan Abreu (born 1985), Dominican baseball player
- Luciana Abreu (born 1985), Portuguese singer and actress
- Lucile Abreu (1920–1996), American police detective
- Lucy d'Abreu (1892–2005), oldest living person in the UK from April 2004
- Manuel Abreu (1959–2022), French-Portuguese football player and coach
- Manuel Abreu (born 1977), Uruguayan footballer
- Manuel de Abreu (1894–1962), Brazilian physician and scientist
- Marco Abreu (born 1974), Angolan footballer
- Marques Batista de Abreu (born 1973), Brazilian footballer
- Marta Abreu (1845–1909), Cuban philanthropist
- Michel Abreu (born 1975), Cuban baseball player
- Miguel Vicente de Abreu (1827–1883), Goan historian
- Norberto Collado Abreu (c. 1921 – 2008), Cuban revolutionary
- Pedro Abreu (born 1957), Cuban basketball player
- Pedro De Abreu (born 1989), Brazilian-American entrepreneur
- Rico Abreu (born 1992), American racing driver
- Santiago Polanco-Abreu (1920–1988), Puerto Rican politician
- Sebastián Abreu (born 1976), Uruguayan footballer
- Sérgio Abreu (actor) (born 1975), Brazilian actor
- Sérgio Abreu (footballer) (born 1967), French footballer
- Sergio Abreu (politician) (born 1945), Uruguayan politician
- Tony Abreu (born 1984), Dominican baseball player
- Vânia Abreu (born 1967), Brazilian singer
- Wilyer Abreu (born 1999), Venezuelan baseball player
- Winston Abreu (born 1977), Dominican baseball player
- Xavier Abreu Sierra (born 1950), Mexican politician
- Yudit Abreu (born 1969), Cuban basketball player
- Zequinha de Abreu (1880–1935), Brazilian composer

== See also ==
- Abreu (disambiguation)
- De Abrew, Sinhala surname driving from "De Abreu"
