= 2011 Chicago Cubs season =

2011 Chicago Cubs
- League: National League
- Division: Central
- Ballpark: Wrigley Field
- City: Chicago, Illinois
- Record: 71–91 (.438)
- Divisional place: 5th
- Owners: Tom Ricketts
- General managers: Jim Hendry
- Managers: Mike Quade
- Television: WGN-TV; WGN America; CSN Chicago; CSN Chicago Plus; WCIU-TV (Len Kasper, Bob Brenly)
- Radio: WGN (AM); Chicago Cubs Radio Network (Pat Hughes, Keith Moreland, Judd Sirott)

The 2011 Chicago Cubs season was the 140th season of the Chicago Cubs franchise, the 136th in the National League and the 96th at Wrigley Field. The Cubs, under new manager Mike Quade, finished fifth in the National League Central with a record of 71–91. The Cubs displayed a patch on their uniforms to remember Cub broadcaster and player Ron Santo, who died in December 2010.

== Regular season ==
=== Season standings ===
==== National League Central ====
NL Central
| Team | W | L | Pct. | GB | Home | Road |
|---|---|---|---|---|---|---|
| Milwaukee Brewers | 96 | 66 | .593 | — | 57‍–‍24 | 39‍–‍42 |
| St. Louis Cardinals | 90 | 72 | .556 | 6 | 45‍–‍36 | 45‍–‍36 |
| Cincinnati Reds | 79 | 83 | .488 | 17 | 42‍–‍39 | 37‍–‍44 |
| Pittsburgh Pirates | 72 | 90 | .444 | 24 | 36‍–‍45 | 36‍–‍45 |
| Chicago Cubs | 71 | 91 | .438 | 25 | 39‍–‍42 | 32‍–‍49 |
| Houston Astros | 56 | 106 | .346 | 40 | 31‍–‍50 | 25‍–‍56 |

==== National League Wild Card ====
Division leaders
| Team | W | L | Pct. |
|---|---|---|---|
| Philadelphia Phillies | 102 | 60 | .630 |
| Milwaukee Brewers | 96 | 66 | .593 |
| Arizona Diamondbacks | 94 | 68 | .580 |

Wild Card team (Top team qualifies for postseason)
| Team | W | L | Pct. | GB |
|---|---|---|---|---|
| St. Louis Cardinals | 90 | 72 | .556 | — |
| Atlanta Braves | 89 | 73 | .549 | 1 |
| San Francisco Giants | 86 | 76 | .531 | 4 |
| Los Angeles Dodgers | 82 | 79 | .509 | 7½ |
| Washington Nationals | 80 | 81 | .497 | 9½ |
| Cincinnati Reds | 79 | 83 | .488 | 11 |
| New York Mets | 77 | 85 | .475 | 13 |
| Colorado Rockies | 73 | 89 | .451 | 17 |
| Florida Marlins | 72 | 90 | .444 | 18 |
| Pittsburgh Pirates | 72 | 90 | .444 | 18 |
| Chicago Cubs | 71 | 91 | .438 | 19 |
| San Diego Padres | 71 | 91 | .438 | 19 |
| Houston Astros | 56 | 106 | .346 | 34 |

=== Game log ===
Legend
| Cubs Win | Cubs Loss | Game postponed |

2011 Game Log

April (12–14): Home (6–8); Road (6–6)
| # | Date | Opponent | Score | Win | Loss | Save | Attend. | Record |
|---|---|---|---|---|---|---|---|---|
| 1 | April 1 | Pirates | 3–6 | Correia (1–0) | Dempster (0–1) | Hanrahan (1) | 41,358 | 0–1 |
| 2 | April 2 | Pirates | 5–3 | Marshall (1–0) | Meek (0–1) | Mármol (1) | 35,782 | 1–1 |
| 3 | April 3 | Pirates | 4–5 | Karstens (1–0) | Mármol (0–1) | Hanrahan (2) | 30,857 | 1–2 |
| 4 | April 4 | Diamondbacks | 4–1 | Wells (1–0) | Saunders (0–1) | Mármol (2) | 26,292 | 2–2 |
| 5 | April 5 | Diamondbacks | 6–5 | Russell (1–0) | Demel (1–1) | Marshall (1) | 27,039 | 3–2 |
| 6 | April 6 | Diamondbacks | 4–6 | Galarraga (1–0) | Dempster (0–2) | Putz (2) | 32,272 | 3–3 |
| 7 | April 8 | @ Brewers | 7–4 | Zambrano (1–0) | Wolf (0–2) | Mármol (3) | 34,310 | 4–3 |
| 8 | April 9 | @ Brewers | 0–6 | Narveson (1–0) | Garza (0–1) | | 42,478 | 4–4 |
| 9 | April 10 | @ Brewers | 5–6 | Loe (1–0) | Wood (0–1) | Axford (3) | 37,193 | 4–5 |
| 10 | April 11 | @ Astros | 5–4 | Dempster (1–2) | Figueroa (0–2) | Mármol (4) | 20,175 | 5–5 |
| 11 | April 12 | @ Astros | 2–11 | Myers (1–0) | Russell (1–1) | | 23,523 | 5–6 |
| 12 | April 13 | @ Astros | 9–5 | Zambrano (2–0) | W. Rodríguez (0–2) | | 20,987 | 6–6 |
| 13 | April 15 | @ Rockies | 0–5 | Chacín (3–0) | Garza (0–2) | | 30,218 | 6–7 |
| 14 | April 16 | @ Rockies | 8–3 | Coleman (1–0) | Hammel (1–1) | | 40,164 | 7–7 |
| 15 | April 17 | @ Rockies | 5–9 | Betancourt (1–0) | Mateo (0–1) | | 42,061 | 7–8 |
| 16 | April 18 | Padres | 1–0 (10) | Mármol (1–1) | Qualls (0–1) | | 36,597 | 8–8 |
| – | April 19 | Padres | Postponed (rain) Rescheduled for April 20 (Game 2) | | | | | |
| 17 | April 20 | Padres | 2–1 (11) | Samardzija (1–0) | Gregerson (0–1) | | 35,544 | 9–8 |
| 18 | April 20 | Padres | 4–5 | Harang (4–0) | Russell (1–2) | Bell (5) | 35,095 | 9–9 |
| 19 | April 22 | Dodgers | 2–12 | Billingsley (2–1) | Coleman (1–1) | | 36,595 | 9–10 |
| 20 | April 23 | Dodgers | 10–8 | Samardzija (2–0) | Guerrier (1–1) | Mármol (5) | 41,161 | 10–10 |
| 21 | April 24 | Dodgers | 3–7 | Kuroda (3–2) | Zambrano (2–1) | | 32,943 | 10–11 |
| 22 | April 25 | Rockies | 3–5 | Rogers (3–1) | Garza (0–3) | Street (8) | 37,417 | 10–12 |
| 23 | April 26 | Rockies | 3–4 | de la Rosa (4–0) | Russell (1–3) | Street (9) | 38,261 | 10–13 |
| – | April 27 | Rockies | Postponed (rain) Rescheduled for June 27 (Game 2) | | | | | |
| 24 | April 28 | @ Diamondbacks | 2–11 | Enright (1–2) | Dempster (1–3) | | 21,720 | 10–14 |
| 25 | April 29 | @ Diamondbacks | 4–2 | Zambrano (3–1) | Galarraga (3–2) | Mármol (6) | 29,450 | 11–14 |
| 26 | April 30 | @ Diamondbacks | 5–3 | Garza (1–3) | Putz (0–1) | Mármol (7) | 27,711 | 12–14 |

May (11–16): Home (6–10); Road (5–6)
| # | Date | Opponent | Score | Win | Loss | Save | Attend. | Record |
|---|---|---|---|---|---|---|---|---|
| 27 | May 1 | @ Diamondbacks | 3–4 | D. Hudson (2–4) | Coleman (1–2) | Putz (6) | 26,620 | 12–15 |
| 28 | May 2 | @ Dodgers | 2–5 | Kershaw (3–3) | Russell (1–4) | Broxton (7) | 29,663 | 12–16 |
| 29 | May 3 | @ Dodgers | 4–1 | Wood (1–1) | Broxton (1–2) | Mármol (8) | 38,017 | 13–16 |
| 30 | May 4 | @ Dodgers | 5–1 | Zambrano (4–1) | Lilly (2–3) | | 28,419 | 14–16 |
| 31 | May 6 | Reds | 4–5 | Volquez (3–1) | Garza (1–4) | Cordero (5) | 35,471 | 14–17 |
| 32 | May 7 | Reds | 3–2 | Mateo (1–1) | Cordero (2–1) | | 37,666 | 15–17 |
| 33 | May 8 | Reds | 0–2 | Cueto (1–0) | Dempster (1–4) | Cordero (6) | 31,931 | 15–18 |
| 34 | May 10 | Cardinals | 4–6 | Carpenter (1–2) | Wood (1–2) | Sánchez (4) | 34,249 | 15–19 |
| 35 | May 11 | Cardinals | 11–4 | Garza (2–4) | Westbrook (2–3) | | 34,439 | 16–19 |
| 36 | May 12 | Cardinals | 1–9 | García (5–0) | Coleman (1–3) | | 32,559 | 16–20 |
| 37 | May 13 | Giants | 11–4 | Dempster (2–4) | Bumgarner (0–6) | | 37,433 | 17–20 |
| 38 | May 14 | Giants | 0–3 (6) | Vogelsong (3–0) | Davis (0–1) | | 39,706 | 17–21 |
| – | May 15 | Giants | Postponed (rain) Rescheduled for June 28 | | | | | |
| 39 | May 16 | @ Reds | 4–7 | Bailey (3–0) | Zambrano (4–2) | Cordero (8) | 16,981 | 17–22 |
| 40 | May 17 | @ Reds | 5–7 | Bray (1–0) | Wood (1–3) | Masset (1) | 18,861 | 17–23 |
| 41 | May 18 | @ Marlins | 7–5 | Samardzija (3–0) | Mujica (4–2) | Mármol (9) | 14,422 | 18–23 |
| 42 | May 19 | @ Marlins | 5–1 | Coleman (2–3) | Volstad (2–3) | | 16,345 | 19–23 |
| 43 | May 20 | @ Red Sox | 5–15 | Lester (6–1) | Davis (0–2) | Atchison (1) | 37,140 | 19–24 |
| 44 | May 21 | @ Red Sox | 9–3 | Marshall (2–0) | Albers (0–2) | | 37,798 | 20–24 |
| 45 | May 22 | @ Red Sox | 1–5 | Wakefield (1–1) | Russell (1–5) | | 37,688 | 20–25 |
| 46 | May 24 | Mets | 11–1 | Dempster (3–4) | Niese (3–5) | | 35,707 | 21–25 |
| 47 | May 25 | Mets | 4–7 (7) | Gee (4–0) | Coleman (2–4) | | 36,666 | 21–26 |
| 48 | May 26 | Mets | 9–3 | Zambrano (5–2) | Beato (1–1) | | 33,378 | 22–26 |
| 49 | May 27 | Pirates | 2–4 | Correia (7–4) | Davis (0–3) | Hanrahan (14) | 34,105 | 22–27 |
| 50 | May 28 | Pirates | 0–10 | Maholm (2–7) | Wells (1–1) | | 38,413 | 22–28 |
| 51 | May 29 | Pirates | 3–2 | Dempster (4–4) | Karstens (3–4) | Mármol (10) | 37,464 | 23–28 |
| 52 | May 30 | Astros | 7–12 | Escalona (1–0) | Samardzija (3–1) | | 30,450 | 23–29 |
| 53 | May 31 | Astros | 3–7 | F. Rodriguez (1–0) | Mármol (1–2) | | 31,178 | 23–30 |

June (11–18): Home (7–6); Road (4–12)
| # | Date | Opponent | Score | Win | Loss | Save | Attend. | Record |
|---|---|---|---|---|---|---|---|---|
| 54 | June 1 | Astros | 1–3 | Myers (2–4) | Davis (0–4) | Melancon (4) | 31,340 | 23–31 |
| 55 | June 3 | @ Cardinals | 1–6 | García (6–1) | Dempster (4–5) | | 40,419 | 23–32 |
| 56 | June 4 | @ Cardinals | 4–5 (12) | Sánchez (2–1) | Samadzija (3–2) | | 43,195 | 23–33 |
| 57 | June 5 | @ Cardinals | 2–3 (10) | Salas (3–0) | López (0–1) | | 40,701 | 23–34 |
| 58 | June 6 | @ Reds | 2–8 | Leake (5–2) | Garza (2–5) | | 22,568 | 23–35 |
| 59 | June 7 | @ Reds | 2–8 | Volquez (4–2) | Davis (0–5) | | 24,921 | 23–36 |
| 60 | June 8 | @ Reds | 4–1 | Dempster (5–5) | Arroyo (4–6) | Mármol (11) | 31,367 | 24–36 |
| 61 | June 9 | @ Phillies | 4–3 (11) | Marshall (3–0) | Herndon (0–1) | Mármol (12) | 44,906 | 25–36 |
| 62 | June 10 | @ Phillies | 5–7 | Halladay (9–3) | Zambrano (5–3) | Bastardo (2) | 45,602 | 25–37 |
| 63 | June 11 | @ Phillies | 1–7 | Lee (6–5) | Garza (2–6) | | 45,738 | 25–38 |
| 64 | June 12 | @ Phillies | 3–4 | Oswalt (4–4) | Marshall (3–1) | Madson (15) | 45,361 | 25–39 |
| 65 | June 13 | Brewers | 1–0 | Samardzija (4–2) | Loe (2–6) | Mármol (13) | 39,070 | 26–39 |
| 66 | June 14 | Brewers | 5–4 (10) | Samardzija (5–2) | Dillard (1–1) | | 39,151 | 27–39 |
| 67 | June 15 | Brewers | 5–9 | Narveson (4–4) | Zambrano (5–4) | | 39,821 | 27–40 |
| 68 | June 16 | Brewers | 12–7 | Garza (3–6) | Greinke (6–2) | | 40,024 | 28–40 |
| 69 | June 17 | Yankees | 3–1 | Davis (1–5) | García (5–6) | Mármol (14) | 42,219 | 29–40 |
| 70 | June 18 | Yankees | 3–4 | Burnett (7–5) | Dempster (5–6) | Rivera (17) | 42,236 | 29–41 |
| 71 | June 19 | Yankees | 4–10 | Sabathia (9–4) | Marshall (3–2) | | 41,828 | 29–42 |
| 72 | June 20 | @ White Sox | 6–3 | Zambrano (6–4) | Floyd (6–7) | Mármol (15) | 36,005 | 30–42 |
| 73 | June 21 | @ White Sox | 2–3 | Crain (3–2) | Samardzija (5–3) | Santos (13) | 35,155 | 30–43 |
| 74 | June 22 | @ White Sox | 3–4 | Peavy (3–1) | Davis (1–6) | Santos (14) | 35,403 | 30–44 |
| 75 | June 24 | @ Royals | 6–4 | Marshall (4–2) | Crow (2–1) | Mármol (16) | 32,918 | 31–44 |
| 76 | June 25 | @ Royals | 2–3 | Holland (2–1) | Samardzija (5–4) | Soria (12) | 38,744 | 31–45 |
| 77 | June 26 | @ Royals | 3–6 | Hochevar (5–8) | Wells (1–2) | Soria (13) | 28,401 | 31–46 |
| 78 | June 27 | Rockies | 7–3 | Garza (4–6) | Chacín (8–5) | | 40,854 | 32–46 |
| 79 | June 28 | Giants | 7–13 | Vogelsong (6–1) | Davis (1–7) | | 39,157 | 32–47 |
| 80 | June 28 | Giants | 3–6 | Zito (1–1) | López (0–2) | Wilson (24) | 38,360 | 32–48 |
| 81 | June 29 | Giants | 2–1 | Mármol (2–2) | Romo (3–1) | | 37,221 | 33–48 |
| 82 | June 30 | Giants | 5–2 (13) | Grabow (1–0) | Ramírez (2–1) | | 38,158 | 34–48 |

July (9–17): Home (6–7); Road (3–10)
| # | Date | Opponent | Score | Win | Loss | Save | Attend. | Record |
|---|---|---|---|---|---|---|---|---|
| 83 | July 1 | White Sox | 4–6 | Jackson (5–6) | Wells (1–3) | Santos (18) | 41,486 | 34–49 |
| 84 | July 2 | White Sox | 0–1 | Humber (8–4) | Garza (4–7) | Thornton (3) | 42,165 | 34–50 |
| 85 | July 3 | White Sox | 3–1 | López (1–2) | Floyd (6–8) | Mármol (17) | 42,311 | 35–50 |
| 86 | July 4 | @ Nationals | 4–5 (10) | Rodríguez (3–1) | Mateo (1–2) | | 32,937 | 35–51 |
| 87 | July 5 | @ Nationals | 2–3 | Detwiler (1–0) | Ortiz (0–1) | Storen (21) | 19,181 | 35–52 |
| 88 | July 6 | @ Nationals | 4–5 | Mattheus (2–0) | Wood (1–4) | Storen (22) | 19,631 | 35–53 |
| 89 | July 7 | @ Nationals | 10–9 | Marshall (5–2) | Rodríguez (3–2) | Mármol (18) | 22,016 | 36–53 |
| 90 | July 8 | @ Pirates | 4–7 | D. McCutchen (3–1) | Marshall (5–3) | Hanrahan (26) | 37,140 | 36–54 |
| 91 | July 9 | @ Pirates | 6–3 | Dempster (6–6) | Correia (11–7) | Mármol (19) | 39,235 | 37–54 |
| 92 | July 10 | @ Pirates | 1–9 | Maholm (6–9) | Ortiz (0–2) | | 31,428 | 37–55 |
| 93 | July 14 | Marlins | 3–6 | Mujica (7–2) | Mármol (2–3) | | 38,145 | 37–56 |
| 94 | July 15 | Marlins | 2–1 | Dempster (7–6) | Nolasco (6–6) | Marshall (2) | 38,391 | 38–56 |
| 95 | July 16 | Marlins | 3–13 | Vázquez (6–8) | Zambrano (6–5) | | 40,709 | 38–57 |
| 96 | July 17 | Marlins | 5–7 | Mujica (8–2) | Wood (1–5) | Oviedo (26) | 37,634 | 38–58 |
| 97 | July 18 | Phillies | 6–1 | López (2–2) | Halladay (11–4) | | 38,183 | 39–58 |
| 98 | July 19 | Phillies | 2–4 | Stutes (4–1) | Marshall (5–4) | Bastardo (7) | 38,857 | 39–59 |
| 99 | July 20 | Phillies | 1–9 | Worley (6–1) | Dempster (7–7) | | 37,864 | 39–60 |
| 100 | July 22 | Astros | 4–2 | Zambrano (7–5) | Norris (5–7) | Marshall (3) | 39,855 | 40–60 |
| 101 | July 23 | Astros | 5–1 | Wells (2–3) | W. Rodríguez (6–7) | | 40,486 | 41–60 |
| 102 | July 24 | Astros | 5–4 (10) | Grabow (2–0) | Carpenter (0–1) | | 40,406 | 42–60 |
| 103 | July 26 | @ Brewers | 2–3 | Narveson (7–6) | Dempster (7–8) | Axford (28) | 39,183 | 42–61 |
| 104 | July 27 | @ Brewers | 0–2 | Greinke (8–4) | Zambrano (7–6) | Axford (29) | 39,233 | 42–62 |
| 105 | July 28 | @ Brewers | 2–4 | Marcum (10–3) | Wells (2–4) | Axford (30) | 40,008 | 42–63 |
| 106 | July 29 | @ Cardinals | 2–9 | Jackson (8–7) | Garza (4–8) | | 42,042 | 42–64 |
| 107 | July 30 | @ Cardinals | 5–13 | Lohse (9–7) | López (2–3) | | 43,784 | 42–65 |
| 108 | July 31 | @ Cardinals | 6–3 | Dempster (8–8) | Westbrook (9–5) | Mármol (20) | 43,960 | 43–65 |

August (16–13): Home (7–6); Road (9–7)
| # | Date | Opponent | Score | Win | Loss | Save | Attend. | Record |
|---|---|---|---|---|---|---|---|---|
| 109 | August 1 | @ Pirates | 5–3 | Zambrano (8–6) | Maholm (6–11) | Mármol (21) | 22,248 | 44–65 |
| 110 | August 2 | @ Pirates | 11–6 | Wells (3–4) | Correia (12–9) | | 26,109 | 45–65 |
| 111 | August 3 | @ Pirates | 1–0 | Garza (5–8) | Resop (3–3) | Mármol (22) | 19,106 | 46–65 |
| 112 | August 4 | @ Pirates | 7–6 | Samardzija (6–4) | D. McCutchen (3–3) | Mármol (23) | 29,317 | 47–65 |
| 113 | August 5 | Reds | 4–3 | Dempster (9–8) | Leake (9–7) | Mármol (24) | 42,245 | 48–65 |
| 114 | August 6 | Reds | 11–4 | Zambrano (9–6) | Cueto (7–5) | | 41,978 | 49–65 |
| 115 | August 7 | Reds | 7–8 | Masset (2–5) | Marshall (5–5) | Cordero (20) | 39,619 | 49–66 |
| – | August 8 | Nationals | Postponed (rain) Rescheduled for August 11 | | | | | |
| 116 | August 9 | Nationals | 1–3 | Wang (1–2) | Garza (5–9) | Storen (30) | 37,109 | 49–67 |
| 117 | August 10 | Nationals | 4–2 | López (3–3) | Detwiler (1–2) | Mármol (25) | 38,010 | 50–67 |
| 118 | August 11 | Nationals | 4–3 | Dempster (10–8) | Zimmermann (7–10) | Mármol (26) | 34,733 | 51–67 |
| 119 | August 12 | @ Braves | 4–10 | Minor (2–2) | Zambrano (9–7) | | 50,146 | 51–68 |
| 120 | August 13 | @ Braves | 8–4 | Wells (4–4) | Lowe (7–11) | Mármol (27) | 49,781 | 52–68 |
| 121 | August 14 | @ Braves | 6–5 | Grabow (3–0) | O'Flaherty (1–4) | Mármol (28) | 32,011 | 53–68 |
| 122 | August 15 | @ Astros | 4–3 | López (4–3) | Sosa (0–2) | Wood (1) | 20,138 | 54–68 |
| 123 | August 16 | @ Astros | 5–6 | A. Rodríguez (1–4) | Mármol (2–4) | | 23,736 | 54–69 |
| 124 | August 17 | @ Astros | 3–4 | Norris (6–8) | Coleman (2–5) | Melancon (12) | 24,054 | 54–70 |
| 125 | August 19 | Cardinals | 5–4 (10) | Marshall (6–5) | Dotel (2–3) | | 42,343 | 55–70 |
| 126 | August 20 | Cardinals | 3–0 | Garza (6–9) | Jackson (9–9) | Mármol (29) | 42,374 | 56–70 |
| 127 | August 21 | Cardinals | 2–6 | Westbrook (10–7) | López (4–4) | | 39,420 | 56–71 |
| 128 | August 22 | Braves | 0–3 | Jurrjens (13–5) | Dempster (10–9) | Venters (5) | 37,061 | 56–72 |
| 129 | August 23 | Braves | 4–5 | Minor (4–2) | Coleman (2–6) | Kimbrel (40) | 36,639 | 56–73 |
| 130 | August 24 | Braves | 3–2 | Wells (5–4) | Lowe (8–12) | Mármol (30) | 37,098 | 57–73 |
| 131 | August 25 | Braves | 3–8 | Beachy (7–2) | Garza (6–10) | | 36,136 | 57–74 |
| 132 | August 26 | @ Brewers | 2–5 | Wolf (11–8) | López (4–5) | Axford (38) | 41,661 | 57–75 |
| 133 | August 27 | @ Brewers | 4–6 | Gallardo (15–8) | Dempster (10–10) | Axford (39) | 44,091 | 57–76 |
| 134 | August 28 | @ Brewers | 2–3 | Greinke (13–5) | Coleman (2–7) | Axford (40) | 41,883 | 57–77 |
| 135 | August 29 | @ Giants | 7–0 | Wells (6–4) | Lincecum (12–11) | | 41,063 | 58–77 |
| 136 | August 30 | @ Giants | 5–2 | Garza (7–10) | Vogelsong (10–5) | Mármol (31) | 41,165 | 59–77 |
| 137 | August 31 | @ Giants | 0–4 | Bumgarner (9–12) | López (4–6) | | 41,099 | 59–78 |

September (12–13): Home (7–5); Road (5–8)
| # | Date | Opponent | Score | Win | Loss | Save | Attend. | Record |
|---|---|---|---|---|---|---|---|---|
| 138 | September 2 | Pirates | 1–3 | Burres (1–0) | Dempster (10–11) | Hanrahan (33) | 35,153 | 59–79 |
| 139 | September 3 | Pirates | 5–7 | Resop (5–4) | Mármol (2–5) | Hanrahan (34) | 36,628 | 59–80 |
| 140 | September 4 | Pirates | 6–3 | Wells (7–4) | Morton (9–9) | Marshall (4) | 40,469 | 60–80 |
| 141 | September 5 | Reds | 4–3 | Garza (8–10) | Willis (0–5) | Mármol (32) | 41,341 | 61–80 |
| 142 | September 6 | Reds | 2–4 (13) | Chapman (4–1) | Grabow (3–1) | Cordero (31) | 35,297 | 61–81 |
| 143 | September 7 | Reds | 6–3 | Wood (2–5) | Ondrusek (4–5) | Mármol (33) | 36,797 | 62–81 |
| 144 | September 9 | @ Mets | 4–5 | Acosta (3–1) | Marshall (6–6) | | 27,639 | 62–82 |
| 145 | September 10 | @ Mets | 5–4 | Wood (3–5) | Parnell (3–6) | Mármol (34) | 30,443 | 63–82 |
| 146 | September 11 | @ Mets | 10–6 (11) | Ortiz (1–2) | Stinson (0–1) | | 33,502 | 64–82 |
| 147 | September 12 | @ Reds | 12–8 | López (5–6) | Willis (0–6) | | 19,874 | 65–82 |
| 148 | September 13 | @ Reds | 1–2 | Leake (12–9) | Dempster (10–12) | Cordero (33) | 19,159 | 65–83 |
| 149 | September 14 | @ Reds | 2–7 | LeCure (1–1) | Coleman (2–8) | | 18,304 | 65–84 |
| 150 | September 15 | @ Reds | 6–8 (11) | Masset (3–5) | Russell (1–6) | | 23,792 | 65–85 |
| 151 | September 16 | Astros | 4–3 (12) | Samardzija (7–4) | Carpenter (0–3) | | 35,318 | 66–85 |
| 152 | September 17 | Astros | 2–1 | López (6–6) | Sosa (2–5) | Marshall (5) | 39,377 | 67–85 |
| 153 | September 18 | Astros | 2–3 | Myers (6–13) | Dempster (10–13) | Melancon (18) | 36,250 | 67–86 |
| 154 | September 19 | Brewers | 5–2 | Coleman (3–8) | Narveson (10–8) | | 35,076 | 68–86 |
| 155 | September 20 | Brewers | 1–5 | Marcum (13–7) | Wells (7–5) | | 36,571 | 68–87 |
| 156 | September 21 | Brewers | 7–1 | Garza (9–10) | Wolf (13–10) | | 30,965 | 69–87 |
| 157 | September 23 | @ Cardinals | 5–1 | Samardzija (8–4) | McClellan (12–7) | | 40,355 | 70–87 |
| 158 | September 24 | @ Cardinals | 1–2 | Motte (5–2) | Mármol (2–6) | | 42,571 | 70–88 |
| 159 | September 25 | @ Cardinals | 2–3 | Dotel (5–3) | Wells (7–6) | Motte (9) | 41,469 | 70–89 |
| 160 | September 26 | @ Padres | 0–2 | Latos (9–14) | Coleman (3–9) | Bell (43) | 26,433 | 70–90 |
| 161 | September 27 | @ Padres | 6–2 | Garza (10–10) | Qualls (6–8) | | 39,058 | 71–90 |
| 162 | September 28 | @ Padres | 2–9 | LeBlanc (5–6) | Dempster (10–14) | | 32,452 | 71–91 |

=== Roster ===
2011 Chicago Cubs
Roster
| Pitchers: 64 Justin Berg; 60,37 Chris Carpenter; 48 Andrew Cashner; 27 Casey Coleman; 32 Doug Davis; 46 Ryan Dempster; 66 Rafael Dolis; 17 Matt Garza; 54 John Gaub; 43 John Grabow; 50 Rodrigo López; 57 Scott Maine; 49 Carlos Mármol; 45 Sean Marshall; 62 Marcos Mateo; 32 Ramón Ortiz; 40 James Russell; 29 Jeff Samardzija; 44 Jeff Stevens; 36 Randy Wells; 34 Kerry Wood; 38 Carlos Zambrano | Catchers: 53 Welington Castillo; 51 Steve Clevenger; 55 Koyie Hill; 18 Geovany Soto; Infielders: 28 Jeff Baker; 15 Darwin Barney; 13 Starlin Castro; 9 Blake DeWitt; 33 DJ LeMahieu; 22 Carlos Peña; 16 Aramis Ramírez | Outfielders: 24 Marlon Byrd; 41 Tony Campana; 21 Tyler Colvin; 1 Kosuke Fukudome; 5 Reed Johnson; 6 Bryan LaHair; 39 Lou Montañez; 56 Brad Snyder; 12 Alfonso Soriano | Manager: 8 Mike Quade; Coaching Staff: 11 Iván DeJesús (third base); 2 Bob Dernier (first base); 7 Rudy Jaramillo (hitting); 95 Andrew Lane (bullpen catcher); 4 Pat Listach (bench); 47 Mark Riggins (pitching); 35 Lester Strode (bullpen); 98 Edgar Tovar (bullpen catcher) |

== Rotation ==
The starting rotation for the 2011 Chicago Cubs at the beginning of the season included Ryan Dempster, Carlos Zambrano, Matt Garza, Randy Wells, and Andrew Cashner.

== Transactions ==
| Date | Transaction | Acquired | From | For | Notes |
|---|---|---|---|---|---|
| November 17, 2010 | Released | Free agency | N/A | Micah Hoffpauir | Signed with Hokkaido Nippon-Ham Fighters |
| December 8, 2010 | Signed | Carlos Peña | Free agency | 1 year, $10 million | $2 million signing bonus, $5 million deferred to January 2012 |
| December 9, 2010 | Claimed | Mason Tobin | Los Angeles Angels of Anaheim | No return | Rule 5 draft |
| December 9, 2010 | Traded for | Cash considerations | Texas Rangers | Mason Tobin | |
| December 9, 2010 | Waived | No return | New York Mets | Ronny Morla | AAA Rule 5 draft |
| December 9, 2010 | Waived | No return | Baltimore Orioles | Casey Lambert | AAA Rule 5 draft |
| December 15, 2010 | Signed | Ángel Guzmán | Free agency | Minor League contract | Former Cub: 2006–2009 |
| December 15, 2010 | Signed | Scott Moore | Free agency | Minor League contract | Former Cub: 2006–2007 |
| December 15, 2010 | Signed | Scott Rice | Free agency | Minor League contract | |
| December 15, 2010 | Signed | Bobby Scales | Free agency | Minor League contract | Former Cub: 2009–2010 |
| December 17, 2010 | Signed | Kerry Wood | Free agency | 1 year, $1.5 million | Former Cub: 1998–2008 |
| December 21, 2010 | Signed | Polín Trinidad | Free agency | Minor League contract | |
| January 5, 2011 | Waived | No return | New York Yankees | Brian Schlitter | |
| January 8, 2011 | Traded for | Matt Garza, Fernando Perez, and Zac Rosscup | Tampa Bay Rays | Chris Archer, Robinson Chirinos, Brandon Guyer, Sam Fuld, and Hak-Ju Lee | |
| January 10, 2011 | Claimed | Max Ramírez | Boston Red Sox | No return | |
| January 12, 2011 | Signed | Reed Johnson | Free agency | Minor League contract | Former Cub: 2008–2009 |
| January 12, 2011 | Purchased | John Urick | Chico Outlaws | Cash considerations | |
| January 17, 2011 | Traded for | A. J. Morris, Michael Burgess, and Graham Hicks | Washington Nationals | Tom Gorzelanny | |
| January 18, 2011 | Signed | Lou Montañez | Free agency | Minor League contract | Former Cubs Prospect |
| January 25, 2011 | Signed | Todd Wellemeyer | Free agency | Minor League contract | Former Cub: 2003–2005 |
| January 27, 2011 | Signed | Braden Looper | Free agency | Minor League contract | |
| January 27, 2011 | Signed | Augie Ojeda | Free agency | Minor League contract | Former Cub: 2000–2003 |
| January 27, 2011 | Signed | Rubi Silva | International free agency | Undisclosed, $1.2 million signing bonus | |
| January 27, 2011 | Signed | Yaniel Cabezas | International free agency | Undisclosed, $500K signing bonus | |
| February 15, 2011 | Traded for | Robert Coello | Boston Red Sox | Tony Thomas | |
| March 27, 2011 | Released | Free Agency | N/A | Carlos Silva | |
| April 10, 2011 | Signed | Ramón Ortiz | Free agency | Minor League contract | |
| April 12, 2011 | Signed | Doug Davis | Free agency | Minor League contract | |
| May 6, 2011 | Released | Free Agency | N/A | Max Ramírez | Signed Minor League contract with the San Francisco Giants |
| May 7, 2011 | Retired | N/A | Chicago Cubs | Todd Wellemeyer | Two stints with the Cubs 2003–2005 and 2011 (minors) |
| May 26, 2011 | Traded for | Rodrigo López | Atlanta Braves | Ryan Buchter | |
| June 27, 2011 | Released | Free Agency | N/A | Bobby Scales | Signed with Hokkaido Nippon-Ham Fighters |
| June 29, 2011 | Released | Free Agency | N/A | Doug Davis | Signed Minor League contract with the Chicago White Sox |
| July 7, 2011 | Released | Free Agency | N/A | Fernando Perez | Signed Minor League contract with the New York Mets |
| July 9, 2011 | Released | Free Agency | N/A | Augie Ojeda | |
| July 15, 2011 | Signed | Dave Bush | Free agency | Minor League contract | |
| July 28, 2011 | Traded for | Abner Abreu and Carlton Smith | Cleveland Indians | Kosuke Fukudome | |

== Player stats ==
=== Batting ===
==== Starters by position ====
Note: Pos = Position; G = Games played; AB = At bats; R = Runs scored; H = Hits; 2b = Doubles; 3B = Triples; HR = Home runs; Avg. = Batting average; RBI = Runs batted in; SB = Stolen bases

| Pos | Player | G | AB | R | H | 2B | 3B | HR | RBI | Avg. | SB |
|---|---|---|---|---|---|---|---|---|---|---|---|
| 2B, 3B, 1B, OF | Jeff Baker | 81 | 201 | 20 | 54 | 12 | 1 | 3 | 23 | .269 | 0 |
| 2B, SS | Darwin Barney | 143 | 529 | 66 | 146 | 23 | 6 | 2 | 43 | .276 | 9 |
| CF | Marlon Byrd | 119 | 446 | 51 | 123 | 22 | 2 | 9 | 35 | .276 | 3 |
| OF | Tony Campana | 95 | 143 | 24 | 37 | 3 | 0 | 1 | 6 | .259 | 24 |
| C | Welington Castillo | 4 | 13 | 0 | 2 | 0 | 0 | 0 | 0 | .154 | 0 |
| SS | Starlin Castro | 158 | 674 | 91 | 207 | 36 | 9 | 10 | 66 | .307 | 22 |
| C | Steve Clevenger | 2 | 4 | 1 | 1 | 1 | 0 | 0 | 0 | .250 | 0 |
| OF, 1B | Tyler Colvin | 80 | 206 | 17 | 31 | 8 | 3 | 6 | 20 | .150 | 0 |
| 2B, 3B, OF | Blake DeWitt | 121 | 230 | 21 | 61 | 11 | 4 | 5 | 26 | .265 | 1 |
| RF | Kosuke Fukudome | 87 | 293 | 33 | 80 | 15 | 2 | 3 | 13 | .273 | 2 |
| C | Koyie Hill | 46 | 134 | 15 | 26 | 3 | 1 | 2 | 9 | .194 | 1 |
| OF | Reed Johnson | 111 | 246 | 33 | 76 | 22 | 1 | 5 | 28 | .309 | 2 |
| 1B | Bryan LaHair | 20 | 59 | 9 | 17 | 5 | 1 | 2 | 6 | .288 | 0 |
| 2B, 3B | DJ LeMahieu | 37 | 60 | 3 | 15 | 2 | 0 | 0 | 4 | .250 | 0 |
| OF | Lou Montañez | 36 | 54 | 6 | 12 | 4 | 0 | 1 | 9 | .222 | 0 |
| 1B | Carlos Peña | 153 | 493 | 72 | 111 | 27 | 3 | 28 | 80 | .225 | 2 |
| 3B | Aramis Ramírez | 149 | 565 | 80 | 173 | 35 | 1 | 26 | 93 | .306 | 1 |
| OF | Brad Snyder | 8 | 9 | 1 | 1 | 0 | 0 | 0 | 0 | .111 | 0 |
| LF | Alfonso Soriano | 137 | 475 | 50 | 116 | 27 | 1 | 26 | 88 | .244 | 2 |
| C | Geovany Soto | 125 | 421 | 46 | 96 | 26 | 0 | 17 | 54 | .228 | 0 |
| | Non-Pitcher Totals | 162 | 5255 | 639 | 1385 | 282 | 35 | 146 | 603 | .264 | 69 |

==== Pitchers batting ====
Note: Pos = Position; G = Games played; AB = At bats; R = Runs scored; H = Hits; 2B = Doubles; 3B = Triples; HR = Home runs; RBI = Runs batted in; Avg. = Batting average; SB = Stolen bases

| Pos | Player | G | AB | R | H | 2B | 3B | HR | RBI | Avg. | SB |
|---|---|---|---|---|---|---|---|---|---|---|---|
| P | Justin Berg | 7 | 2 | 0 | 0 | 0 | 0 | 0 | 0 | .000 | 0 |
| P | Andrew Cashner | 7 | 1 | 0 | 0 | 0 | 0 | 0 | 0 | .000 | 0 |
| P | Casey Coleman | 21 | 25 | 1 | 4 | 1 | 1 | 0 | 0 | .160 | 0 |
| P | Doug Davis | 7 | 10 | 0 | 0 | 0 | 0 | 0 | 0 | .000 | 0 |
| P | Ryan Dempster | 34 | 58 | 1 | 5 | 0 | 0 | 0 | 0 | .086 | 0 |
| P | Matt Garza | 30 | 64 | 2 | 6 | 0 | 0 | 0 | 1 | .094 | 0 |
| P | Rodrigo López | 25 | 30 | 1 | 2 | 0 | 0 | 0 | 0 | .067 | 0 |
| P | Ramón Ortiz | 22 | 2 | 0 | 0 | 0 | 0 | 0 | 0 | .000 | 0 |
| P | James Russell | 59 | 8 | 0 | 1 | 0 | 0 | 0 | 0 | .125 | 0 |
| P | Jeff Samardzija | 71 | 4 | 0 | 0 | 0 | 0 | 0 | 0 | .000 | 0 |
| P | Jeff Stevens | 4 | 2 | 0 | 0 | 0 | 0 | 0 | 0 | .000 | 0 |
| P | Randy Wells | 22 | 43 | 2 | 6 | 0 | 0 | 0 | 1 | .140 | 0 |
| P | Carlos Zambrano | 22 | 44 | 8 | 14 | 2 | 0 | 2 | 5 | .318 | 0 |
| | Pitcher Totals | 162 | 294 | 15 | 38 | 3 | 1 | 2 | 7 | .129 | 0 |

=== Pitching ===
==== Starting pitchers ====
Note: W = Wins; L = Losses; ERA = Earned run average; G = Games pitched; GS = Games started; SV = Saves; IP = Innings pitched; H = Hits allowed; R = Runs allowed; ER = Earned runs allowed; BB = Walks allowed; K = Strikeouts

| Player | W | L | ERA | G | GS | SV | IP | H | R | ER | BB | K |
|---|---|---|---|---|---|---|---|---|---|---|---|---|
| Casey Coleman | 3 | 9 | 6.40 | 19 | 17 | 0 | 84.1 | 102 | 62 | 60 | 46 | 75 |
| Doug Davis | 1 | 7 | 6.50 | 9 | 9 | 0 | 45.2 | 59 | 38 | 33 | 26 | 36 |
| Ryan Dempster | 10 | 14 | 4.80 | 34 | 34 | 0 | 202.1 | 211 | 111 | 108 | 82 | 191 |
| Matt Garza | 10 | 10 | 3.32 | 31 | 31 | 0 | 198.0 | 186 | 90 | 73 | 63 | 197 |
| Rodrigo López | 6 | 6 | 4.42 | 26 | 16 | 0 | 97.2 | 116 | 56 | 48 | 29 | 54 |
| Randy Wells | 7 | 6 | 4.99 | 23 | 23 | 0 | 135.1 | 141 | 76 | 75 | 47 | 82 |
| Carlos Zambrano | 9 | 7 | 4.82 | 24 | 24 | 0 | 145.2 | 154 | 80 | 78 | 56 | 101 |

==== Relief pitchers ====
Note: W = Wins; L = Losses; ERA = Earned run average; G = Games pitched; GS = Games started; SV = Saves; IP = Innings pitched; H = Hits allowed; R = Runs allowed; ER = Earned runs allowed; BB = Walks allowed; K = Strikeouts

| Player | W | L | ERA | G | GS | SV | IP | H | R | ER | BB | K |
|---|---|---|---|---|---|---|---|---|---|---|---|---|
| Justin Berg | 0 | 0 | 3.75 | 8 | 0 | 0 | 12.0 | 11 | 5 | 5 | 6 | 6 |
| Chris Carpenter | 0 | 0 | 2.79 | 10 | 0 | 0 | 9.2 | 12 | 3 | 3 | 7 | 8 |
| Andrew Cashner | 0 | 0 | 1.69 | 7 | 1 | 0 | 10.2 | 3 | 2 | 2 | 4 | 8 |
| Rafael Dolis | 0 | 0 | 0.00 | 1 | 0 | 0 | 1.1 | 0 | 0 | 0 | 1 | 1 |
| John Gaub | 0 | 0 | 6.75 | 4 | 0 | 0 | 2.2 | 2 | 2 | 2 | 2 | 3 |
| John Grabow | 3 | 1 | 4.76 | 58 | 0 | 0 | 62.1 | 67 | 39 | 33 | 28 | 38 |
| Scott Maine | 0 | 0 | 10.29 | 7 | 0 | 0 | 7.0 | 11 | 8 | 8 | 5 | 5 |
| Carlos Mármol | 2 | 6 | 4.01 | 75 | 0 | 34 | 74.0 | 54 | 33 | 33 | 48 | 99 |
| Sean Marshall | 6 | 6 | 2.26 | 78 | 0 | 5 | 75.2 | 66 | 21 | 19 | 17 | 79 |
| Marcos Mateo | 1 | 2 | 4.30 | 23 | 0 | 0 | 23.0 | 24 | 11 | 11 | 10 | 25 |
| Ramón Ortiz | 1 | 2 | 4.86 | 22 | 2 | 0 | 33.1 | 31 | 20 | 18 | 11 | 25 |
| James Russell | 1 | 6 | 4.12 | 64 | 5 | 0 | 67.2 | 76 | 37 | 31 | 14 | 43 |
| Jeff Samardzija | 8 | 4 | 2.97 | 75 | 0 | 0 | 88.0 | 64 | 35 | 29 | 50 | 87 |
| Jeff Stevens | 0 | 0 | 5.14 | 4 | 0 | 0 | 7.0 | 4 | 4 | 4 | 7 | 4 |
| Kerry Wood | 3 | 5 | 3.35 | 55 | 0 | 1 | 51.0 | 45 | 23 | 19 | 21 | 57 |
| Team Pitching Totals | 71 | 91 | 4.33 | 162 | 162 | 40 | 1434.1 | 1439 | 756 | 690 | 580 | 1224 |

== Farm system ==
| Level | Team | League | Manager |
|---|---|---|---|
| AAA | Iowa Cubs | Pacific Coast League | Bill Dancy |
| AA | Tennessee Smokies | Southern League | Brian Harper |
| A | Daytona Cubs | Florida State League | Buddy Bailey |
| A | Peoria Chiefs | Midwest League | Casey Kopitzke |
| A-Short Season | Boise Hawks | Northwest League | Mark Johnson |
| Rookie | AZL Cubs | Arizona League | Juan Cabreja |

LEAGUE CHAMPIONS: Daytona
