= Sinhalese name =

A Sinhalese name or Sinhala name may contain two or three parts: a patronymic, one or more given names, and sometimes a surname, which was often absent in the past. Full names can be rather long, and hence are often shortened, by omitting or abbreviating the family name and one of the given names, as in R. M. S. Ariyaratna.

Family names can be distinguished by the suffix -ge or -ghe, though this suffix may accidentally result from a particular transliteration of a Sinhalese word, such as sinha or singha (lion).

Given names can be masculine, feminine and gender neutral.

Sinhalese surnames often originate from Sanskrit. However, as a consequence of the Portuguese invasion of Sri Lanka, during the 16th and 17th centuries, many Portuguese language surnames were adopted among the Sinhalese people. As a result, Perera and Fernando eventually became the most common names in Sri Lanka.

== Structure ==
Sinhalese names usually consists of three parts. The first part is the patronymic name (family name) of the father, ancestor name or 'house name', which often has the suffix ‘-ge’ at the end of it, this is known as the 'Ge' name. 'Ge' meaning house in Sinhalese, however in this context, 'ge' is used to express 'belonging to'. For example, the sinhala patronymic name "Rajapaksha Mudiyansela-ge" means "Rajapaksha Mudiyansela's".

The second part is the personal name (given name) and the third part is the surname.

For example, in the name Rajapaksha Mudiyanselage Siril Ariyaratna, Rajapaksha is the first part of the family name, Mudiyanselage is the 'Ge' name (second part of the family name) and Siril and Ariyaratna are two given names.

Some names contain a family name, a given name, and a surname (Type 1) while some names contain only a family name and a given name (Type 2). Modern Sinhalese names do not contain a family name and only contain a given name and a surname (Type 3).

Structure of Sinhalese names
	Family name	Given name	Surname
Type 1	Nawungala Jagodage	Chaminda Jayalal	Senaratne
Type 2	Nawungala Jagodage	Chaminda Jayalal	-
Type 3	-	Chaminda Jayalal	Senaratne

Conversion of Sinhalese names into Western structure
	First name + Middle name	Last name	Notes
Type 1 (a)	Nawungala Jagodage Chaminda Jayalal	Senaratne	Surname used as the Last name
Type 1 (b)	Chaminda Jayalal Senaratne	Nawungala Jagodage	Family name used as the Last name
Type 2	Chaminda Jayalal	Nawungala Jagodage	Family name used as the Last name
Type 3	Chaminda Jayalal	Senaratne	Surname used as the Last name

- In Sri Lankan passport, the name is divided into two parts as Surname and Other names wheres Surname means the Last name and Other names means the First name + Middle name. When a person's name contain all three parts (Type 1) or does not contain a Surname (Type 2), he/she can alternatively choose to use Family name as the Surname in passport.

=== Family name ===
==== Foreign origin names ====
The Portuguese and Dutch being in Sri Lanka has left a legacy where many Sinhalese people converted religion or took on foreign names through intermarriage or adoption.

Portuguese

- Almeida/de Almeida
- Cabral/Cabraal
- Correa/Corea
- Costa/de Costa
- De Alwis, derived from the surname ‘Alves’
- Dias
- Fernando
- Fonseka
- Gomes
- Mendis, derived from the surname ‘Mendes’
- Nonis, derived from the surname ‘Nunes’
- Peiris, derived from the surname ‘Peres’
- Perera/Pereira
- Pigera from the surname 'Figueira'
- Sigera, derived from the surname ‘Siqueira’
- Silva/de Silva
- Suwaris from the surname 'Soares'
- Thabrew/de Abrew, derived from the surname ‘Abreu’
- Tissera, derived from the surname ‘Teixeira’
