= Kumarage =

Kumarage is a Sinhalese patronymic and surname. Notable people with the name include:

- Andrew Kumarage (1934–2012), Sri Lankan Anglican bishop
- Kulasiri Kumarage (1942–1999), Sri Lankan politician
