= José Abreu (disambiguation) =

José Abreu (born 1987) is a Cuban-born baseball player.

José Abreu may also refer to:

- José Abreu (second baseman) (1910–?), Cuban baseball player
- José Antonio Abreu (1939–2018), Venezuelan orchestra conductor and advocate of music education for youth
- Antonio José Álvarez de Abreu, 1st Marquis de la Regalía (1688–1756), Spanish colonial administrator
- José Abreu Morell (1864–1889), Cuban painter
- Jose Abreu (basketball) (1974–1996), Puerto Rican basketball player
- José Carlos Abreu (born 1954), Portuguese footballer
