= Antonio Susini =

Antonio Susini may refer to:

- Antonio Susini (sculptor)
- Antonio Susini (baseball)
