= Thilan =

Thilan (Sinhala: තිලාන්) is a Sinhalese masculine given name. Notable people with the name include:

- Thilan Nimesh (born 1997), Sri Lankan cricketer
- Thilan Prashan (born 1998), Sri Lankan cricketer
- Thilan Samaraweera (born 1976), Sri Lankan cricketer
- Thilan Thushara (born 1981), Sri Lankan cricketer
- Thilan Walallawita (born 1998), English cricketer
- Thilan Wijesinghe, Sri Lankan financier, entrepreneur, former cricketer and musician
