= José Leblanc =

Cuban baseball player (1894–1922)

- Pitcher
- Born: 1894; Cienfuegos, Cuba
- Died: January 31, 1922 (aged 27–28); Santiago, Cuba
- Batted: Right Threw: Right

debut
- 1920, Cuban Stars West

Last appearance
- 1921, for the Cincinnati Cuban Stars

Career statistics
- Win–loss record: 26–21
- Earned run average: 2.31
- Strikeouts: 220

Teams
- Cuban Stars West / Cincinnati Cuban Stars (1920–1921)

José Leblanc Vargas (1894 – January 31, 1922), nicknamed "Cheo" and "Count", was a Cuban baseball pitcher in Negro league baseball. He played most of his career with the midwestern Cuban Stars, including in the first two seasons of the original Negro National League. His career earned run average of 2.31, as well as 7.8 wins above replacement (WAR) per 162, are among the best marks for qualified pitchers in the recognized Negro major leagues. In the Cuban League, he played for Almendares (also managed by the Stars' Tinti Molina) and Habana.

Despite his dominance of Negro league baseball, little trace of Leblanc exists in the historical record. Though he was with the Cuban Stars in 1919, none of the visas present at the team's border crossing bear his name - a detail he shares only with his teammate Eufemio Abreu. Two visas, however, had names otherwise unknown to baseball - Manuel Barros and Isidro Valdés - so it is possible that the lack of records is the result of "José Leblanc" being an assumed name, with one of the aforementioned pair of names being his real identity.

He died during a winter game in Santiago, after being struck in the head with a bat by Antonio Susini during an extended argument and later altercation between both teams and the umpires over a close play at home in a local championship series.
