= Alfredo Giaccio =

Argentine chess grandmaster (born 1970)

Personal information
- Born: Alfredo Gustavo Giaccio; July 15, 1970 (age 56) Buenos Aires, Argentina

Chess career
- Country: Argentina
- Title: Grandmaster (2013)
- Peak rating: 2517 (January 2002)

Alfredo Gustavo Giaccio (born July 15, 1970) is an Argentine chess Grandmaster (2013).

== Chess career ==
Giaccio has competed multiple times in the finals of the Argentine Chess Championship, winning a bronze medal in 1998. He represented Argentina in international team competitions, including the Chess Olympiads of 1998 and 2000, winning an individual bronze medal for his performance on board five in 2000.

He fulfilled his norms for the Grandmaster title in 1999 (during the Argentine Championship final), 2005 (in Havana), and 2008 (in Lorca).

Giaccio has achieved success in numerous international tournaments, including 1st place in Buenos Aires (2001), 1st place in Ocaña (2002), 2nd place in São Paulo (2003, behind Aryam Abreu Delgado), tied for 1st place in Campo Grande (2004, alongside Felipe El Debs), 2nd place in São José do Rio Preto (2004, behind Eduardo Limp), 1st place in São José do Rio Preto (2005), tied for 1st place in São José do Rio Preto (2005, with Martín Crosa Coll), 2nd place in Havana (2005, Capablanca Memorial–B, behind Yuniesky Quesada Pérez), 1st place in Mendoza (2005), and tied for 2nd place in Almería (2007, behind Manuel Rivas Pastor, tied with Diego Jesús Martínez García).

His highest FIDE rating was 2517, achieved on January 1, 2002, when he ranked 5th among Argentine chess players.
