= South St. Paul Secondary =

Location
- 700 North Second Street; South St. Paul, Minnesota 55075; United States; 44.8928°N 93.0421°W

Information
- Other name: South St. Paul High School
- Type: Public high school
- School district: South St. Paul Public Schools
- NCES School ID: 273327001456
- Principal: MS:Leah Bourg HS: Chuck Ochocki
- Teaching staff: 45.12 (on an FTE basis)
- Grades: 6–12
- Enrollment: 868 (2023–2024)
- Student to teacher ratio: 19.24
- Colors: Maroon and white
- Athletics conference: Metro East Conference
- Mascot: Sir Loin
- Nickname: Packers
- Yearbook: Kaposian
- Website: MS middleschool.sspps.org HS highschool.sspps.org
- Rivals: Simley High School, Tartan High School

South St. Paul Secondary (also known as South St. Paul High School) is a public high school in South St. Paul, Minnesota, United States. It is part of the South St. Paul Public Schools district, it is a participant of the International Baccalaureate Diploma Program in grades 11 and 12 after moving away from the IB World Schools in 2023.

== History ==
Construction was started on the original building in 1905; the school opened on January 23, 1907, as Central High. It was renamed to its current name in 1911, when a new building was constructed. An expansion occurred in 1923 and an auditorium and athletic fields were finished in 1930. In the early twentieth century, the school housed night classes for immigrants who wished to gain American citizenship.

== Athletics ==
South St. Paul athletic teams are nicknamed "Packers" and compete in the Metro East Conference.

State Championships
Sport	Year(s)
Hockey (girls)	2002, 2003, 2005, 2006
Track and field (girls)	1979

== Performing arts ==
SSP has one competitive show choir, the 7th to 12th grade mixed-gender "Southside Sensation". A former show choir was the all-female "Diamond Divas" which ended due to the COVID-19 pandemic.

== Notable alumni ==
- Gene Anderson, professional wrestler
- Jim Carter, football player
- Justin Faulk, hockey player
- John Gaub, baseball player
- John Green, basketball player
- Grant Hart, musician
- Karin Housley, politician and businesswoman
- Phil Housley, hockey player
- Jim LeClair, football player
- Sunisa Lee, gymnast
- Betty McCollum, congresswoman
- Warren Miller, hockey player
- Tim Pawlenty, businessman and politician
- Alex Stalock, hockey player
- Adam Wilcox, hockey player
- Doug Woog, hockey player, coach and broadcaster
