= Sigera =

Sigera is a Sinhalese surname derived from the Portuguese Siqueira. Notable people with the surname include:

- Asel Sigera (born 1999), Sri Lankan cricketer
- G. L. Sigera, Sri Lankan general
- Hiruna Sigera (born 1999), Sri Lankan cricketer
