= Abreu =

Abreu may refer to:

- Abreu (surname)

== Places ==
- University "Marta Abreu" of Las Villas, a university in Santa Clara, Cuba
- Abreu Vineyards, a winery in Napa Valley, US
- Abreu Camp, a settlement within Philmont Scout Ranch, New Mexico, US
- Abreu e Lima, municipality in the state of Pernambuco, Brazil
- Bento de Abreu, municipality in the state of São Paulo, Brazil
- Casimiro de Abreu, Rio de Janeiro, a municipality in the state of Rio de Janeiro, Brazil

== Companies ==
- Viagens Abreu, Portuguese travel agency

== Other ==
- Abreugraphy, or chest photofluorography, a photofluorography technique for mass screening for tuberculosis
