= Miguel Vicente de Abreu =

Portuguese historian (1827–1883)

Miguel Vicente de Abreu (1827 – 1883) was a Portuguese historian and a minor official of the Imprensa Nacional (government printing press). He belonged to the group of Goan intellectuals who were trained and sponsored by scholar Joaquim Heliodoro da Cunha Rivara while he was the state secretary of State of Portuguese India. De Abreu was Knight of the Ordem de Nossa Senhora da Conceição de Vila Viçosa and member of the Royal Academy of Sciences (Academia Real das Ciências de Lisboa).

== Historical rivalry ==
Portuguese historian Teotónio de Souza narrates an episode which suggests rivalry between local historians in colonial Goa. He refers to the "curious incident" between two Goan historians, Felipe Nery Xavier and Abreu. Comments Souza: "Their contribution to Goan history has been significant. The former was a first grade officer of the finance department, and he had already made a mark as historian before the arrival in Goa of the Portuguese historian-administrator Cunha Rivara in 1855. The latter was a low-grade employee of the Government printing press, and was a disciple of Cunha Rivara who trained him as historian."

According to Souza, Abreu felt victimised by his country colleague who decided to reduce his pay to half, probably because of academic rivalry. Abreu presented a letter of protest to Cunha Rivara, then the Chief Secretary of the State, saying: "If Your Excellency deem that the law is on my side, please do not leave its interpretation to the intelligence of Mr. Felipe Nery, because this native chief (sorry to use this expression) has no concern for his subjects as the Portuguese masters have for their people. Perhaps that is the reason why God has placed you over us. May God keep your Excellency for many years as my boss."

In later generations their families intermarried, resulting in the Goan-Portuguese politician, lawyer and journalist António Maria Eurico Alberto Fiel Xavier.

== Home in Panjim ==
Describing his home in current-day Panjim in 2012, the German Cultural Week Goa organisers said: "Built in the 19th century, every stone of this Pombaline Portuguese house tells a fascinating story of its colonial past. Miguel Vicente de Abreu (1827-1883) was a Goan intellectual and Provincial Associate of the Royal Academy of Science of Lisbon."

== Published works ==
- O governo do vice-rei conde do Rio Pardo estado da ïndia Portuguesa desde 1816 até 1821. Nova Goa: Imprensa Nacional, 1869.
- Bosquejo histórico de Goa... / Rev. Diniz L. Cottineau de Kloguen; (translated into Portuguese by Miguel Vicente d'Abreu). Nova Goa : Imp. Nacional, 1858.
- Folhinha civil e ecclesiastica de Goa para o anno de 1850. Nova Goa : Imprensa Nacional, 1849.
- Relação das alterações políticas de Goa. Nova Goa : Imprensa Nacional, 1862.
- Breves apontamentos biográficos de D. Frei Manuel de S. Galdino / Compiled by Miguel Vicente de Abreu. Nova Goa : Imp. Nacional, 1862.
- Breves apontamentos biographicos do Arcebispo de Goa, D. Frei Manoel de S. Galdino. Nova Goa : [s.n.], 1862.
- Breves apontamentos biográficos de Dom Frei Manuel e São Galdino. Nova Goa : Imp. Nacional, 1862.
- Noção de alguns filhos distinctos da India portugueza que se illustraram fora da patria. Nova Goa : Imp. Nacional, 1874.
- Catalogo dos secretarios do estado da India portuguesa. Nova Goa : Imp. Nacional, 1866.
- Narração da Inquisição de Goa / Charles Dellon; translated into Portuguese with some added notes and corrections by Miguel Vicente de Abreu; introd. Ada Mastor; actual. do texto e reorg. Júlio Henriques. 2a ed. Lisboa : Antígona, 1996 (ISBN 972-608-075-4).
- Real Mosteiro de Santa Monica de Goa : memoria historica. Nova-Goa : Imprensa Nacional, 1882.
- Narração da Inquisição de Goa escripta em francez por Mr. Dellon vertida em portuguez e accrescentada com varias memorias, notas, documentos, e um appendice, contendo a noticia que da mesma Inquisição deu o inglez Caludio Buchanan. Nova Goa : Imprensa Nacional, 1866.
- Memoria sobre os livros das monções do reino do archivo do Governo Geral da Índia Portuguesa ordenada por Miguel Vicente d'Abreu. Nova Goa : Imprensa Nacional, 1868.
- Breve noticia da creação e exercicio da aula de principios de phisica, chimica e historia natural do Estado da India Portugueza. Nova-Goa : Imp. Nacional, 1873.
- Constituições do arcebispado de Goa. [Nova Goa ? : s.n.. 1878.
- Constituições do Arcebispado de Goa [S.l. : s.n.]. 1878.
