= Lucile Abreu =

American police detective (1920–1996)

- Born: September 20, 1920; Honolulu, Territory of Hawaii
- Died: August 30, 1996 (aged 75)
- Education: Chaminade University of Honolulu
- Occupation: Police officer
- Known for: Promoting gender equality

Lucile Abreu (September 20, 1920 – August 30, 1996) was an American police officer, known for her work promoting gender equality in the Hawaiian police force. In 1972 she sued the Honolulu Police Department for discriminatory hiring and promotion practices; the suit was settled in her favor. As a result of her lawsuit the Honolulu Police Department changed their hiring policies.

== Early life ==
Lucile Abreu was born in Honolulu on September 20, 1920. After she married Frank Abreu, she began attending a university, after which she hoped to work with children with mental illnesses. Abreu quit studying after she was hired by the Honolulu Police Department in 1953.

== Career ==
In the police department she worked at the Juvenile Crime Prevention Division (the only unit where women were allowed). She passed the sergeant's test 67 times, but was never promoted because she was a woman, and did not meet the minimum height requirement of 5 feet 8 inches (173 cm).

Abreu first filed a complaint with the Equal Employment Opportunity Commission, and then a lawsuit in 1972, which in 1975 was resolved in her favor. The suit led to the Honolulu Police Department allowing women to hold the same jobs as men, and to abolish their minimum height requirement of 5 feet 8 inches (1.73 m). Police badges were also changed to read "officer" instead of "patrolman".

After the lawsuit, having newly graduated with a bachelor's degree from Chaminade University of Honolulu, Abreu was promoted to become Honolulu's first female detective, and assigned to a newly created unit for the investigation of rapes.

== Personal life ==
Abreu retired in 1978. She died of cancer on August 30, 1996.
