= Kulasiri Kumarage =

Sri lankan politician

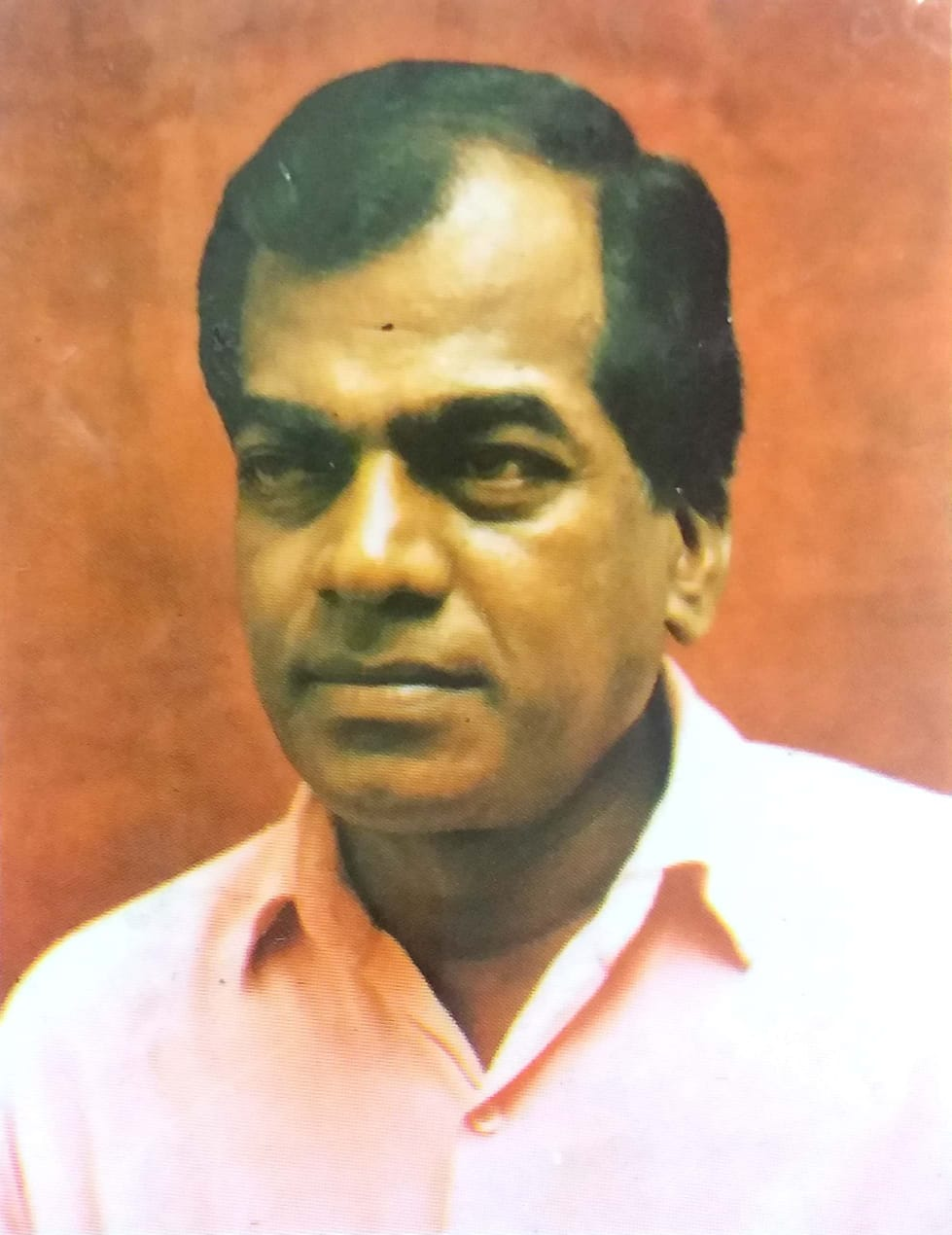
- Born: Kumarage Don Kulasinghe; 30 October 1942; Hanwella, Colombo, British Ceylon (now Sri lanka)
- Died: 28 May 1999 (aged 56)
- Education: Magammana Maha Vidyalaya Homagama
- Political party: Lanka Sama Samaja Party
- Spouse: Sumana Kumarage
- Parent: Uduwanage Podi Nona (mother) Samel Kumarage (Father)

Kulasiri Kumarage (Sinhala: කුලසිරි කුමාරගේ; born Kumarage Don Kulasinghe; 30 October 1942) was a Sri lankan politician. He was a member of the Western Provincial Council from 1988 to 1998.

== Early life ==
Kulasiri Kumarage was born on 30 October 1942 at Hanwella, Diddeniya, Colombo, to the family of Samel Kumarage and Uduwanage Podi Nona. He was the only child in the family and lived in Homagama during his childhood. Kulasiri Kumarage received his early education at the Magammana Maha Vidyalaya, Homagama.

== Political career ==
Kumarage, took to politics at the age of eighteen as a member of the UNP. He joined the Lanka Sama samaja Party in 1964. Kulasiri Kumarage was first elected to the Homagama Town Council in 1968 and served until 1972 representing the Lanka Sama Samaja Party.

He also participated in the 11th World Festival of Youth and Students which was held in Cuba.

Kumarage was elected at the provincial council elections of 1988 as a member of the United Socialist Front and was re elected from the People's Alliance at the elections held in 1993.

== Legacy ==
Kulasiri Kumarage Mawatha is named after him.

== Personal life ==
Kumarage married Sumana Kumarage on 12 October 1970. They had two daughters.
