= John Gaub =

American baseball player (born 1985)

- Pitcher
- Born: April 28, 1985 (age 41); St. Paul, Minnesota, U.S.
- Batted: Right Threw: Left

MLB debut
- September 12, 2011, for the Chicago Cubs

Last MLB appearance
- September 26, 2011, for the Chicago Cubs

MLB statistics
- Win–loss record: 0-0
- Earned run average: 6.75
- Strikeouts: 3
- Stats at Baseball Reference

Teams
- Chicago Cubs (2011)

John David Gaub (born April 28, 1985) is a former Major League Baseball pitcher.

== Career ==
Prior to playing professional baseball, Gaub attended South St. Paul High School and then the University of Minnesota. He was originally drafted by the Minnesota Twins out of high school in the 25th round of the 2003 amateur draft, however he opted not to sign. When he was drafted in the 21st round of the 2006 amateur draft by the Cleveland Indians, he did sign.

He began his professional career in 2007 with the GCL Indians, going 0-0 with a 2.25 ERA in four games. He pitched for the Lake County Captains in 2008, making 34 relief appearances and going 1-1 with a 3.38 ERA. In 64 innings, he struck out 100 batters while walking 32.

On December 31, 2008, he was traded with minor leaguer Christopher Archer and Jeff Stevens to the Cubs for Mark DeRosa. He split 2009 between the Tennessee Smokies (26 games) and Iowa Cubs (26 games), going a combined 4-2 with a 2.25 ERA. He struck out 80 batters and walked 33 in 60 innings of work.

Gaub began 2010 with the Iowa Cubs. He made his MLB debut with the Cubs in 2011.

Gaub was claimed by the Tampa Bay Rays off waivers in April 2012.

On May 21, 2012, Gaub was designated for assignment by the Rays and was claimed by the Texas Rangers a few days later.

On June 9, 2012 Gaub was claimed off waivers by the St. Louis Cardinals.

Before the 2013 season, he turned down an offer to return to Triple-A Memphis in favor of returning to his alma mater to get a business marketing degree.
