= Chris Archer =

American baseball player (born 1988)

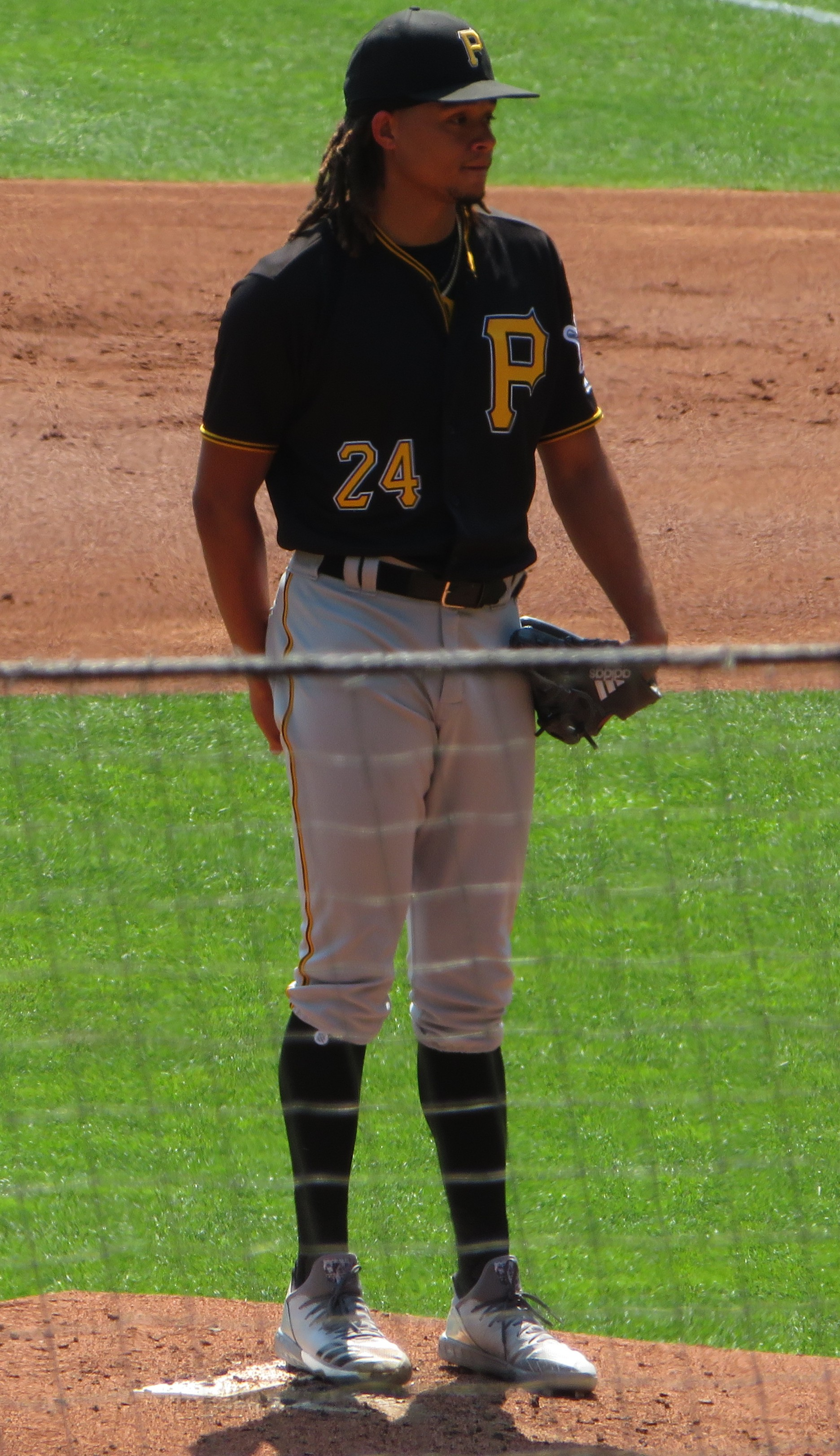
- Archer with the Pittsburgh Pirates in 2018
- Pitcher
- Born: September 26, 1988 (age 37); Raleigh, North Carolina, U.S.
- Batted: Right Threw: Right

MLB debut
- June 20, 2012, for the Tampa Bay Rays

Last MLB appearance
- September 10, 2022, for the Minnesota Twins

MLB statistics
- Win–loss record: 63–89
- Earned run average: 3.93
- Strikeouts: 1,454
- Stats at Baseball Reference

Teams
- Tampa Bay Rays (2012–2018); Pittsburgh Pirates (2018–2019); Tampa Bay Rays (2021); Minnesota Twins (2022)

Career highlights and awards
- 2× All-Star (2015, 2017)
Medals
Men's baseball
Representing United States
World Baseball Classic
Gold medal – first place	2017 Los Angeles	Team

Christopher Alan Archer (born September 26, 1988) is an American former professional baseball pitcher. He played in Major League Baseball (MLB) for the Tampa Bay Rays, Pittsburgh Pirates and Minnesota Twins.

Archer attended Clayton High School in Clayton, North Carolina. He was drafted by the Cleveland Indians in the fifth round of the 2006 MLB draft. After he was traded to the Chicago Cubs and then the Rays, he made his MLB debut in 2012. Archer was selected to the 2015 and 2017 MLB All-Star Games.

== Amateur career ==
Archer attended Clayton High School in Clayton, North Carolina, where he played for the school's baseball team. He signed a letter of intent to attend the University of Miami, but decided to turn professional after high school. Archer pitched to an 8–3 win–loss record with a 1.75 earned run average (ERA) during his senior season at Clayton.

== Professional career ==
=== Cleveland Indians ===
Archer was drafted by the Cleveland Indians in the fifth round of the 2006 MLB draft. He joined the Rookie-level Gulf Coast Indians after signing. He also pitched in one game for the Burlington Indians of the Rookie-level Appalachian League.

Archer remained with the Gulf Coast Indians to start the 2007 season. In 2008, Archer had a 4–8 win–loss record in 27 games started for the Lake County Captains of the Single–A South Atlantic League.

=== Chicago Cubs ===
On December 31, 2008, Archer was traded, with John Gaub and Jeff Stevens to the Chicago Cubs for Mark DeRosa.

Archer pitched for the Peoria Chiefs of the Single–A Midwest League during the 2009 season, and was 6–4 with a 2.81 ERA and 119 strikeouts (seventh in the league) in 109 innings while leading the league with 66 walks, and not allowing any home runs.

In 2010, Archer had a 15–3 win–loss record with a 2.34 earned run average (ERA) and 149 strikeouts in 142.1 innings between the Daytona Cubs of the High–A Florida State League and Tennessee Smokies of the Double–A Southern League. He was third among all minor league pitcher in wins, and seventh in ERA. With Daytona, Archer had a streak of 41 innings pitched without allowing an earned run. He was named the Cubs' Minor League Pitcher of the Year, and the Cubs added him to their 40-man roster to protect him from being selected by another team in the Rule 5 Draft. After the season, Archer pitched for the United States national baseball team in the qualifying tournament for the 2011 Pan American Games. Defeating the Cuban national baseball team, USA Baseball called Archer's game the International Performance of the Year.

=== Tampa Bay Rays ===
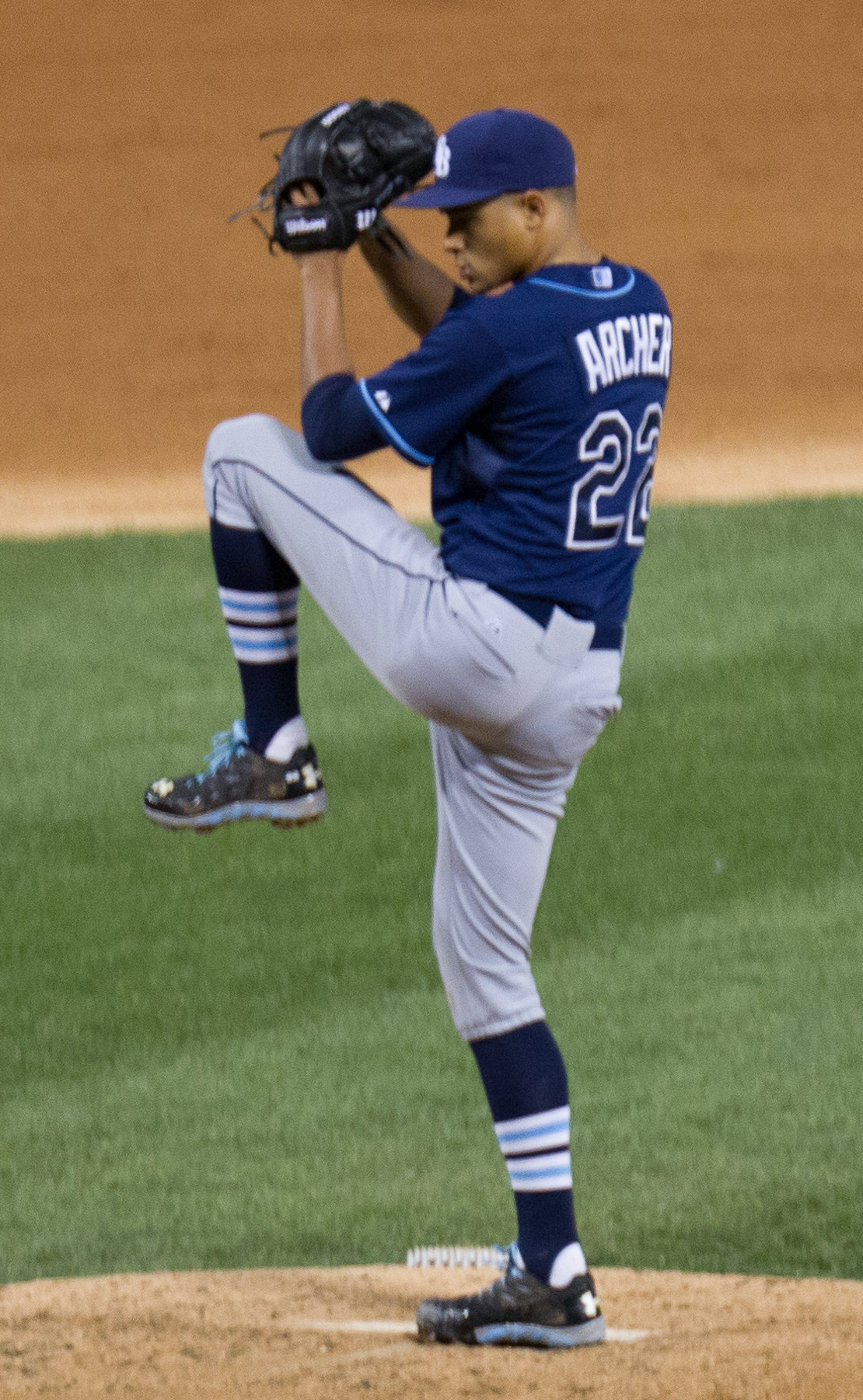
Archer pitching for the Tampa Bay Rays in 2014

In January 2011, the Cubs traded Archer to the Tampa Bay Rays with Hak-ju Lee, Brandon Guyer, Robinson Chirinos, and Sam Fuld for Matt Garza, Fernando Perez, and Zac Rosscup. At the start of the season, he was rated the 27th-best prospect in baseball by Baseball America. Pitching for the Montgomery Biscuits of the Double–A Southern League, Archer had a 5.85 ERA through the first two months of the season and a 5.27 ERA at the end of the first half of the season. In the second half, he made a turnaround, going 5–4 with a 3.45 ERA. Archer received a promotion to the Durham Bulls of the Triple–A International League, making two starts for the Bulls at the end of the season, and allowing only one run. Between the two teams he was a combined 9–7 with a 4.09 ERA, and 130 strikeouts in 147.1 innings, and led the Southern League with 18 wild pitches.

==== 2012 season ====
Baseball America rated Archer the Rays' third-best prospect and the 89th-best prospect in baseball before the 2012 season. Archer pitched to a 4–8 win–loss record with a 4.81 ERA in 14 games started for Durham to start the 2012 season. He was promoted to the major leagues for the first time on June 20, starting in place of the injured Jeremy Hellickson. In his MLB debut, Archer allowed three hits and three runs (one earned) while recording seven strikeouts in six innings, becoming the first pitcher the Rays did not draft to start a game for the team since Matt Garza on September 30, 2010.

Archer became the first pitcher to register an at-bat at Oriole Park at Camden Yards when he finished an at-bat for injured Ryan Roberts, striking out under orders not to swing. He recorded his first major league win on September 19, 2012, against the Boston Red Sox at Tropicana Field after going five innings and giving up three earned runs.

In 2012 with the Bulls, he was 7–9 with a 3.66 ERA, and led the league with 139 strikeouts in 128 innings.

==== 2013 season ====
Archer began the 2013 season with Triple-A Durham. He was called up on June 1, 2013, to start against the Cleveland Indians. In his first extended action in the majors, Archer went 9–7 with a 3.22 ERA in 23 starts. Among AL rookies, Archer ranked first in ERA, opponents' average (.226), complete games (two), shutouts (two), hits per nine innings (7.5) and WHIP (1.13). He was named the AL Pitcher of the Month and AL Rookie of the Month for July. Archer finished third in voting for AL Rookie of the Year, behind Detroit's Jose Iglesias and teammate Wil Myers.

==== 2014 season ====
On April 2, 2014, it was announced that Archer had agreed to a six-year extension with the Rays worth $25.5 million guaranteed. The two option years would pay Archer about $9 million and $11 million, with the total contract maxing out at $43.75 million for all eight seasons. For the season, he went 10–9 with a 3.33 ERA, 1.28 WHIP and 173 strikeouts in 194 2/3 innings pitched.

==== 2015 season ====
Archer was named the Rays' Opening Day starter after Alex Cobb was placed on the 15-day Disabled List to begin the season. On June 2, Archer struck out 15 batters in a 6–1 victory over the Los Angeles Angels of Anaheim. Archer was selected to the 2015 MLB All-Star Game, where he pitched 1.1 innings and gave up one run. On August 20, he threw a one-hit shutout against the Houston Astros, in which he threw only 98 pitches and struck out 11.

Archer finished the season 12–13 with a 3.23 ERA (fifth in the league) and 252 strikeouts (second), in 212 innings (sixth). His strikeout total surpassed Scott Kazmir's 2007 total of 239 for the most in a single season by a Rays pitcher. Archer finished 5th in the American League Cy Young Award voting, behind Dallas Keuchel, David Price, Sonny Gray, and Chris Sale. Archer also provided guest color commentary for ESPN in their coverage of the 2015 American League Wild Card Game, and served as a guest commentator for Baseball Tonight and ESPN Radio during that year's World Series.

==== 2016 season ====
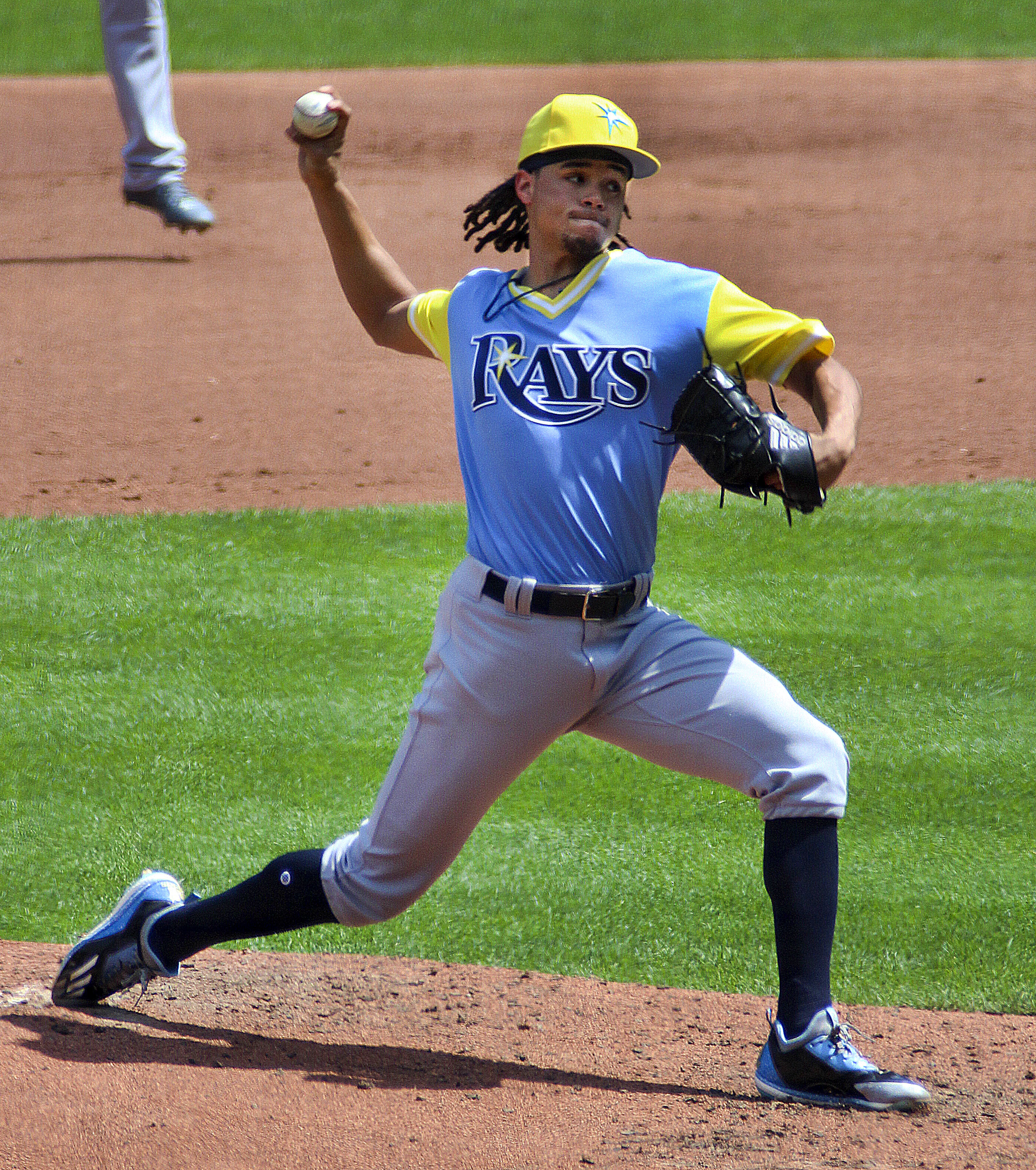
Archer with the Rays in 2017

Archer was a favorite among many baseball writers and fans to win the Cy Young Award before the season started after his strong 2015. Despite these expectations, Archer took a step back in 2016, posting a 4.66 ERA in the first half of the season. Archer rebounded strongly in the second half, however, and posted a 3.25 ERA. He finished the season with a 4.02 ERA, 233 strikeouts (tied for second in the American League behind Justin Verlander), and a 10.4 strikeouts per nine ratio, in 201.1 innings (8th). He also led the majors with 19 losses, which can be attributed to his giving up 30 home runs and poor 3.48 run support. Following the season, Archer once again served as a guest analyst for ESPN and ESPN Radio during the 2016 World Series.

==== 2017 season ====
After pitching in the World Baseball Classic, Archer received the nod as the Rays opening day starter. He allowed only 2 runs in 7 innings, receiving the win. In May, Archer set a franchise record for strikeouts in a month with 58, topping David Price's record of 53. On July 6, Archer was named to his second career all-star game. On August 17, Archer recorded his 1,000th career strikeout, becoming the 9th player in history to achieve this feat in 154 games or less. After a strong end to August, capped off by a 7 inning, one run performance in St. Louis, Archer looked poised to finish above .500 for the first time since 2014, ending the month of August at 9–7 with a 3.66 ERA. However over his next 5 games he went 0–5 allowing 18 runs and failing to get past the 4th inning in 4 of the 5 games played, and his ERA skyrocketed to 4.18. His ended his season with a 10–12 record and a 4.07 ERA, a career high. He did, however, finish the season with 249 strikeouts, good for 3rd in the American League, as well as an 11.1 strikeouts per nine ratio, in 201 innings (6th). He tied for the major league lead in wild pitches, with 15.

==== 2018 season ====
Archer was chosen as the opening day starter for the fourth year in a row. On May 1, Archer threw his 1,000th career inning. On June 5, Archer was put on the 10-day disabled list with an abdominal strain.

=== Pittsburgh Pirates ===
On July 31, 2018, Archer was traded to the Pittsburgh Pirates in exchange for Tyler Glasnow, Austin Meadows and a player to be named later, later revealed to be Shane Baz.

In a game on April 7, 2019, against the Cincinnati Reds, Archer gave up a second-inning, two-run home run to Derek Dietrich. As the ball flew over the wall, Dietrich stayed at home plate and admired the ball for a few seconds as it went over before he started running. When Dietrich returned to bat in the fourth inning, Archer threw a ball behind Dietrich's back. Benches cleared, five people were ejected, and Archer struck out Dietrich when play resumed. Archer denied intent, but received a five-game suspension on April 9. For the season, he was 3–9 with a career-worst 5.19 ERA.

On June 3, 2020, it was announced that Archer would be out until 2021 after he underwent surgery for thoracic outlet syndrome.

On October 31, 2020, the Pirates declined Archer's club option for 2021, making him a free agent for the first time in his career.

=== Tampa Bay Rays (second stint) ===
On February 9, 2021, Archer signed a one-year, $6.5 million contract with Tampa Bay. On May 8, 2021, Archer was placed on the 60-day injured list with forearm tightness. On August 22, the Rays activated Archer from the injured list.

=== Minnesota Twins ===
On March 28, 2022, Archer signed a one-year contract with the Minnesota Twins. On November 7, 2022, the Twins declined the option on his 2023 season, making him a free agent.

== Post-playing career ==
On December 4, 2023, Archer took a job with the Los Angeles Dodgers as an assistant in their baseball operations department for the 2024 season.

== International career ==
Archer pitched for Team USA in the 2017 World Baseball Classic. In his only start of the tournament, the first game for Team USA, Archer pitched four perfect innings against Colombia in a 3–2, extra-inning victory for the US.

== Scouting profile ==
Archer is listed at 6 feet 3 inches (1.91 m) and 200 pounds (91 kg). He threw a four-seam fastball between 93–96 miles per hour (150–154 km/h) that could reach 99 mph (159 km/h). His secondary pitches included a dominating slider at 86–89 mph, and circle change from 86 to 90 mph. According to Pedro Martinez, Archer was prone to expose the ball too early, long before release, leading to batters getting clear clues to his pitches, and compounded by his slow release time compared to other right-handed low-three-quarters-position pitchers like Edinson Vólquez and Jacob deGrom.

== Personal life ==
Archer's biological mother, Sonya Clark, is Caucasian. His biological father, Darryl Magnum, is African-American. Archer was raised by Donna and Ron Archer, his maternal grandparents, who adopted him when he was two years old.
