= Antonio Susini (baseball) =

Cuban baseball player (1901–??)

- Shortstop
- Born: 1901; Havana, Cuba
- Batted: Right Threw: Right

Negro league baseball debut
- 1921, for the All Cubans

Last appearance
- 1936, for the Cuban Stars

Teams
- All Cubans (1921); Cuban Stars (1936)

Antonio Susini (1901 – death date unknown) was a Cuban shortstop in the Negro leagues and Cuban League. He is most notable for killing José Leblanc, a prominent pitcher in the Cuban Stars, with a baseball bat.

== Career ==
A native of Havana, Cuba, Susini played for Almendares in the Cuban League in 1918–1919, and went on to play for the All Cubans in 1921.

On January 30, 1922, an argument broke out over a close play, and players from both teams began arguing with umpires and each other, culminating in a heated exchange between Susini and José Leblanc of the Cuban Stars. Suddenly, the argument turned violent, as Susini struck him on the head with a baseball bat, fracturing Leblanc's skull and resulting in his death the following day.

Susini served roughly 10-14 years in prison on the Isla de Pinos for his crime, though the exact number of years is unclear. However, this would prove not be the end of his professional baseball career, as he played as a pinch hitter for the Cuban Stars (though not the same ones that Leblanc used to play for) in 1936, and played 50 games as a first baseman in the Gallos de Santa Rosa of the Mexican League in 1937 and 1938.

== Personal life ==
According to former All Cubans teammate Cheo Ramos, Susini was a Columbia-style rumba dancer and a member of the Abakuá society.
