= Florêncio de Abreu =

Brazilian lawyer, journalist, writer and politician

Florêncio Carlos de Abreu e Silva
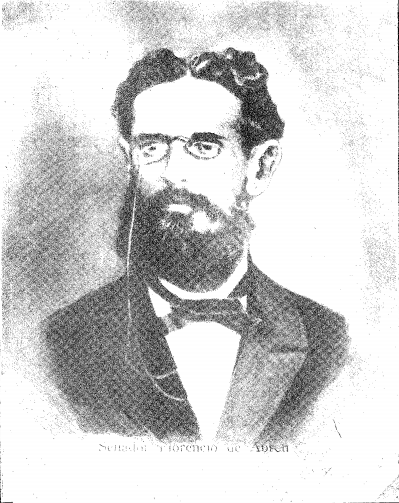
- Born: October 20, 1839
- Died: December 12, 1881

Florêncio Carlos de Abreu e Silva (October 20, 1839 in Porto Alegre – December 12, 1881 in Rio de Janeiro) was a lawyer, journalist, writer and politician from Brazil.

He was a member of the parliament of the province of Rio Grande do Sul, senator of Brazilian Empire and president of São Paulo (state) from April 7 to November 5, 1881.
