= De Abrew =

- Language: Sinhala

Origin
- Region of origin: Sri Lanka

Other names
- Derived: De Abreu

De Abrew is a Sinhalese surname derived from the Portuguese surname De Abreu.

== Notable people ==
- Alexander Nicholas de Abrew Abeysinghe (1894–1963), Sri Lankan Sinhala politician
- Owen de Abrew (born 1920), Sri Lankan ballroom dancer
- Peter De Abrew (1862–1940), Ceylonese industrialist
- Sarath de Abrew (c. 1953–2016), Sri Lankan judge
- Sisira de Abrew, Sri Lankan judge
