= Charles Abreu =

Cuban composer and pianist

Charles Abreu (1919–1994) was a Cuban composer and pianist. He was born in Marianao and studied at the Havana Municipal Conservatory. Abreu worked as a pianist in theatres and nightclubs, and he also played on the radio. He was involved with several musical groups, and toured extensively in the Caribbean region, Latin America and Europe. He moved to the US in 1962, in the wake of the Cuban Revolution, where he continued to work as a musician and led his own group.

His most famous songs are "Te necesito", "Cariño mío", and "La vida mia".
