= Pedro De Abreu =

Brazilian American entrepreneur, educator, and author

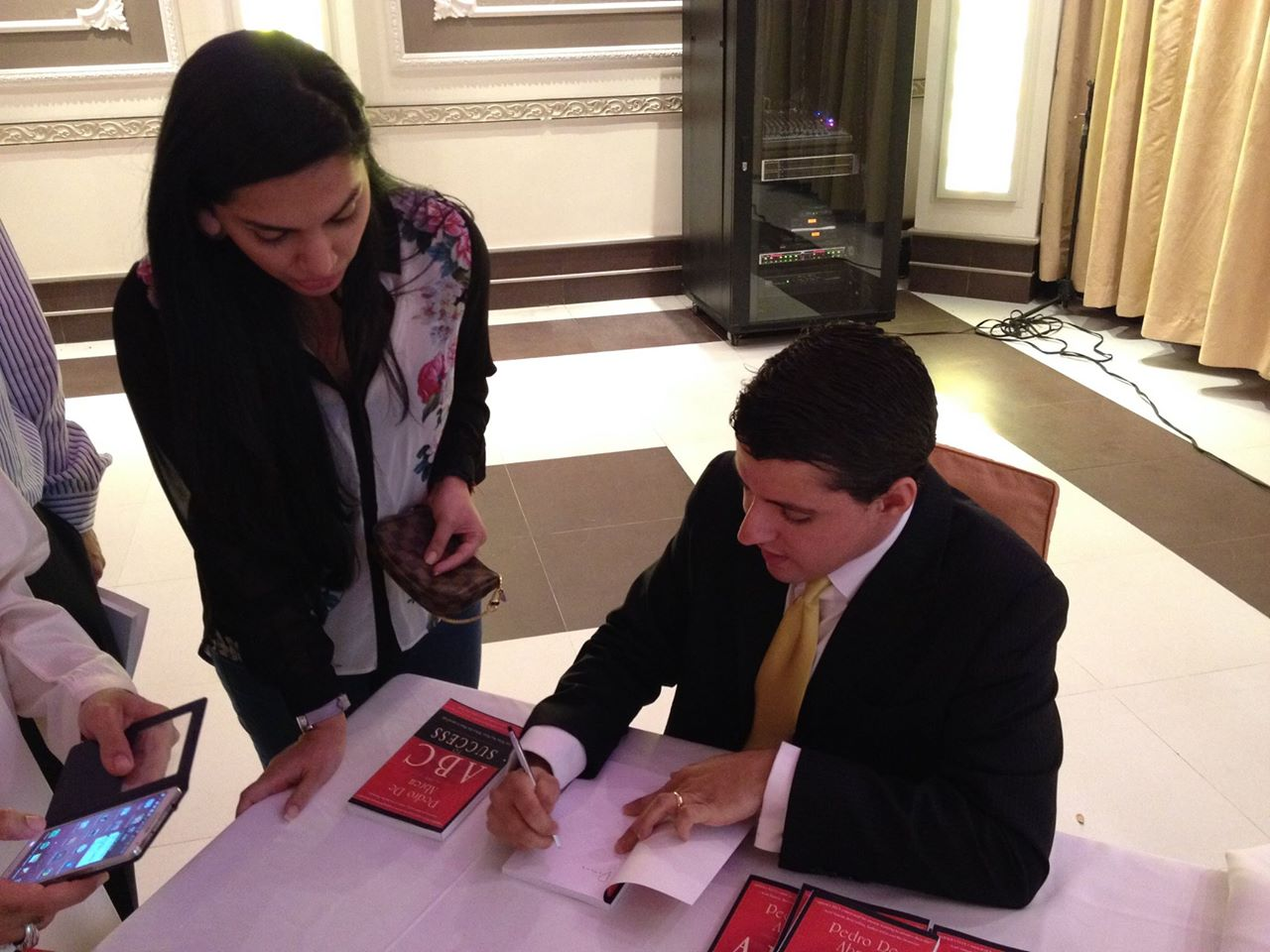
- De Abreu at a book signing in Dubai
- Born: July 14, 1989 (age 37); Brasília, DF, Brazil
- Education: Harvard University; University of South Carolina
- Occupations: Entrepreneur; educator; author
- Website: pedrodeabreu.com

Pedro de Abreu (born July 14, 1989) is a Brazilian American entrepreneur, educator, and author. He was the co-founder of a multi-media company in Hollywood, California, and the founder and director of the nonprofit organization Check Mate Foundation. De Abreu directs the Brain and Cognitive Science thematic at the AI Initiative.

De Abreu was published in a book by Marshall Cavendish, a subsidiary company to the Times Publishing Group, among 25 young entrepreneurs from around the world.

== Early life and education ==
De Abreu was born in Brasília, Distrito Federal, and grew up on the coastal city of João Pessoa, Paraíba, where he experienced poverty and struggled to get by as a teenager. He moved to America in 2005 without knowing how to speak English. He became fluent in one year and was placed into Advanced Placement classes, including English, European history and psychology. He graduated from Chapin High School and Midlands Technical College before attending the Moore School of Business at the University of South Carolina, focusing his work on economics. De Abreu subsequently attended Harvard University, where he attained a master's degree in an emerging scientific field that brings together cognitive neuroscience, developmental cognitive neuroscience, educational psychology, education theory and other related disciplines to explore the interactions between biological processes and practice. At Harvard, De Abreu received the Leadership in Education Award, a merit-based fellowship given to top master's degree candidates with strong leadership potential. De Abreu is South Carolina's New Century Scholar, an award given by Phi Theta Kappa, USA Today and the Coca-Cola Foundation to the state's top student. De Abreu is a Walker Institute and Magellan Scholar, City of Columbia Fellow, and the recipient of the C. Russell Hill Memorial Scholarship for Economics. The latter for his research titled "The Development of Empathy, Leadership and Pro-Social Dispositions in Middle-School and High School Age Children: A Case Study of Peer Education and the Anne Frank Story in Brazil."

== Government ==
In April 2014, De Abreu was appointed to serve on the board of directors of the Central Midlands Council of Governments(CMCOG), one of the most influential councils in South Carolina, assisting local governments develop local and regional plans within four midlands counties (Fairfield, Lexington, Newberry, Richland), as well as providing local governments with planning and technical support to improve the quality of life within the regions. CMCOG currently consists of 14 member governments in its board of directors, and serves in excess of 725,000 people.

=== Nonprofit ===
In South Carolina, De Abreu started the non-profit Check Mate Foundation, which focuses on teaching chess and leadership to children with disabilities and also to underprivileged children. In an interview in 2011, he said: "Chess is just really a medium through which we try to implement leadership and character... Chess will never be on the SAT. But the patience, analytical skills, the thinking skills, the ability to do those things will be skills that will be forever in demand." In another interview, he stated: "Studies have shown that chess develops logical thinking, improves concentration and promotes imagination, creativity and independence." As a speaker, De Abreu was represented internationally by Sabirul Islam's Teen Speakers International Bureau.

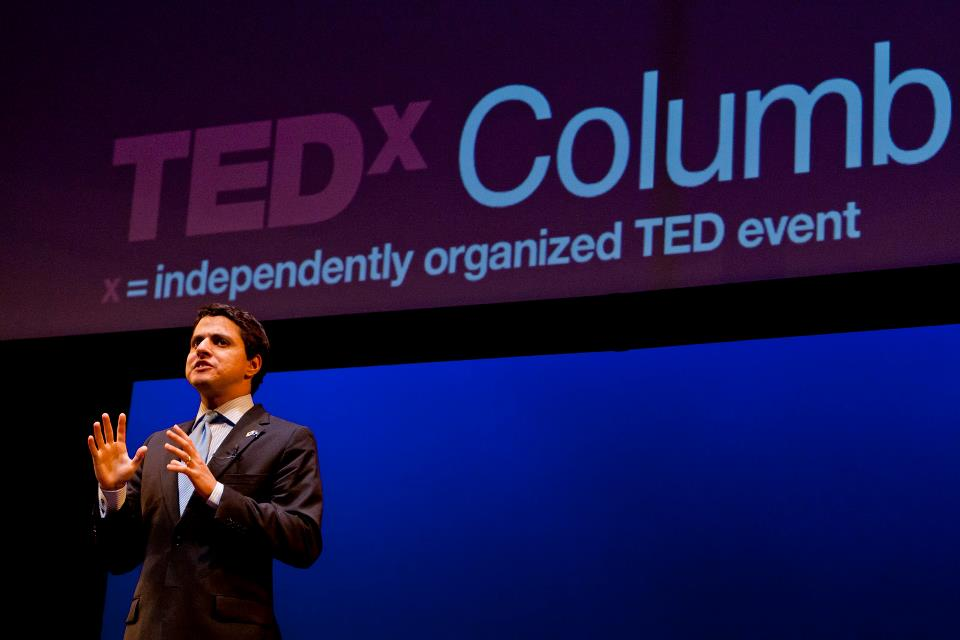
De Abreu at TEDx

De Abreu has spoken in countries like Dubai, Oman, Kuwait, Bahrain and Brazil, and at TEDx.

==== Author ====
In 2011, De Abreu published his first book, detailing the hardships he had to overcome in Brazil due to the lack of opportunity, and in America for not being able to speak English on his arrival, as well as practical steps one can take to achieve meaningful change. Author Scott Simson said that his book is "a must read for anyone wanting to advance their life." De Abreu writes a monthly column for Richard Branson's Virgin on the topics of science, innovation, entrepreneurship, and public speaking. In 2012, De Abreu was featured on Young Entrepreneur World: How 25 Teen-Trepreneurs Succeeded and Left World Leaders Scratching Their Heads, published by British publisher Marshall Cavendish, a subsidiary company of Times Publishing Group, the printing and publishing subsidiary of Singapore-based conglomerate Fraser and Neave. De Abreu is a Teaching Fellow at the Harvard Graduate School of Education. He facilitates the Management Development Program at the Harvard Graduate School of Education and the Mind, Brain, Behavior Interfaculty Thesis Workshops for graduating seniors at Harvard College. De Abreu is the Director of the Artificial Intelligence, Brain, and Cognitive Sciences thematic at the AI Initiative.

== Television ==
De Abreu hosted a biweekly segment on WLTX, a CBS-affiliated television station, called The Motivational Minute, on motivation and leadership.
