= Abner Abreu =

Dominican baseball player (born 1989)

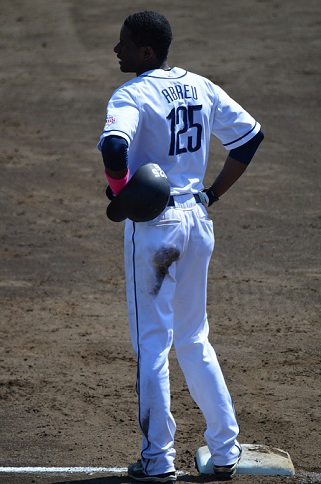

Tokyo Yakult Swallows
- Outfielder
- Born: October 24, 1989 (age 36); San Pedro de Macoris, Dominican Republic
- Batted: Right Threw: Right

NPB debut
- May 23, 2014, for the Saitama Seibu Lions

Last NPB appearance
- June 1, 2014, for the Saitama Seibu Lions

NPB statistics
- Batting average: .250
- Home runs: 0
- Runs batted in: 4
- Stats at Baseball Reference

Teams
- Saitama Seibu Lions (2013–2014); Kōchi Fighting Dogs (2015)

Abner Abreu Castro (born October 24, 1989) is a Dominican former professional baseball outfielder. He played in Nippon Professional Baseball (NPB) for the Saitama Seibu Lions. He currently serves as a scout for the Saitama Seibu Lions.

== Career ==
=== Playing career ===
Abreu played in the Minor League System for the Cleveland Guardians, Chicago Cubs, and Atlanta Braves. He later played for the Saitama Seibu Lions of Nippon Professional Baseball.

Abreu spent the 2016 season with the Yomiuri Giants, but played only for their farm team; in 16 appearances, he went 2-for-35 (.057) with one RBI and six walks. On October 2, 2016, the Giants released Abreu.

=== Post-playing career ===
Abreu currently works as an international scout with the San Francisco Giants.

On November 20, 2025, the Saitama Seibu Lions of Nippon Professional Baseball hired Abreu to serve as an international scout for the Middle and South American regions.
