= Eufemio Abreu =

Cuban baseball player (born 1901)

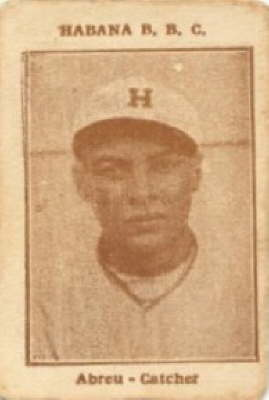
- Catcher / Right fielder / First baseman / Third baseman
- Born: 1901; Matanzas, Cuba
- Batted: Right Threw: Right

Negro league baseball debut
- 1918, for the Cuban Stars (West)

Last appearance
- 1925, for the Cuban Stars (West)

Negro National League I statistics
- Batting average: .241
- Home runs: 2
- Runs batted in: 87
- Stats at Baseball Reference

Teams
- Cuban Stars (West) (1918–1921, 1923–1925); Almendares (1922–1923); Habana (1923); Indianapolis ABCs (1925)

Eufemio Abreu (born 1901 in Matanzas, Cuba – death date unknown) was a Cuban professional baseball catcher, right fielder, first baseman and third baseman in Negro league baseball and the Cuban League. He played professionally from 1918 to 1925 with the Cuban Stars (West), Almendares, Habana, and the Indianapolis ABCs. He finished his career in the Negro National League I with a batting average of .241, 227 hits, 2 home runs and 87 runs batted in (RBIs) in 1,043 plate appearances.
