= Siqueira =

Siqueira is a Portuguese surname. Notable people with the surname include:

- Ethevaldo Mello de Siqueira (1932–2022), Brazilian journalist
- Indianarae Siqueira (* 1971), Brazilian activist
- Maria Könning-de Siqueira Regueira (* 1954), German diplomat
- Marco Aurélio Siqueira (* 1970), Brazilian footballer
- Luciano Siqueira de Oliveira (* 1975), Brazilian footballer
- Cláudio Roberto Siqueira Fernandes (* 1980), Brazilian footballer
- Henry Siqueira-Barras (* 1985) Brazilian-Swiss footballer
- Guilherme Siqueira (* 1986), Brazilian footballer
