= Aryam Abreu Delgado =

Cuban chess grandmaster (born 1978)

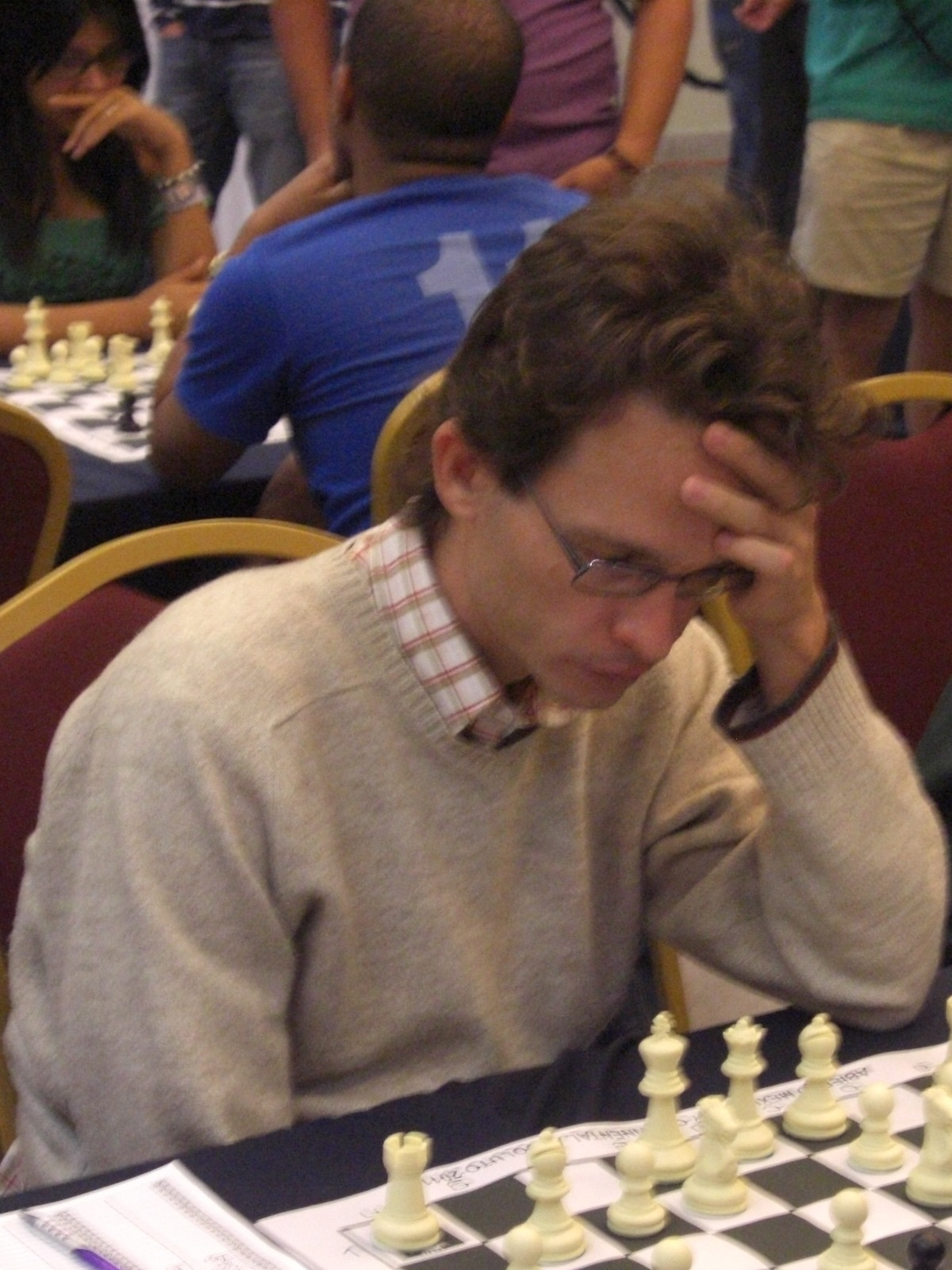
- Aryam Abreu Delgado, Toluca 2011

Personal information
- Born: July 9, 1978 (age 48)

Chess career
- Country: Cuba
- Title: Grandmaster (2008)
- FIDE rating: 2434 (July 2026)
- Peak rating: 2502 (July 2008)

Aryam Abreu Delgado (born 9 July 1978) is a Cuban chess Grandmaster (2008).

Best results: 2nd at Albariño International Open in Cambados, October 2005; 1st at the Villa de Mislata Open in Spain 2005; 4th in the Cuban Championship 2007; 1st-2nd at the Capablanca Memorial Open 2008; 1st at the Villa de Bilbao Rapid 2008.

His best Elo rating was 2502 in 2008.
