= Antonio José Álvarez de Abreu, 1st Marquis de la Regalía =

Spanish noble

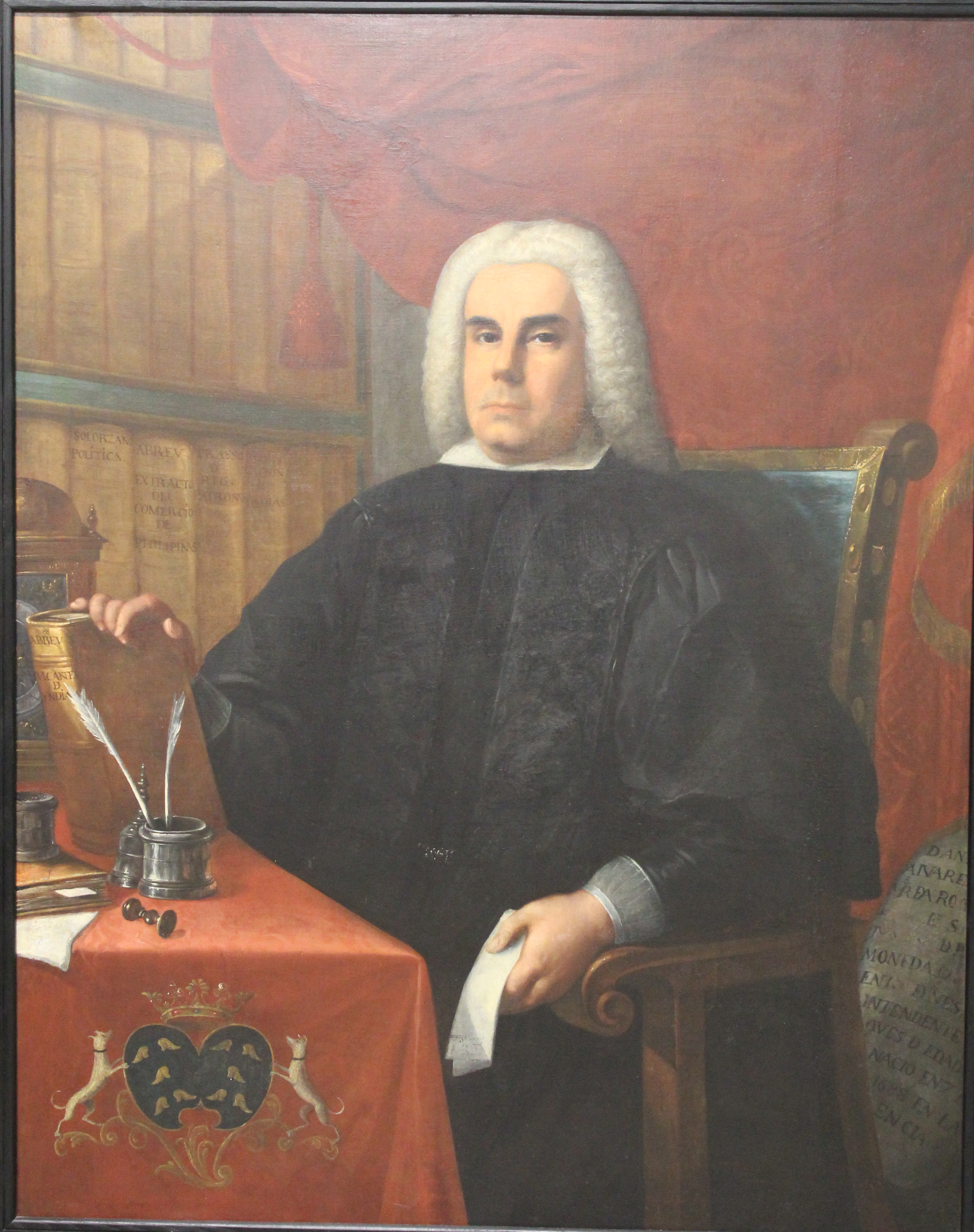
Portrait of Antonio José Álvarez de Abreu, by Antonio González Ruiz. Musée de Parthenay.

Antonio José Álvarez de Abreu was a notable figure in Spanish history (8 July 1688 in Santa Cruz de la Palma, Canary Islands, Spain – 28 November 1756), Marquis de la Regalía by King Philip V of Spain on 8 July 1738.

== Biography ==
Anotonios' father was Sergeant Domingo Álvarez Hernández and mother María Yáñez Abreu. He studied Latin and Philosophy at the Augustinian Convent of La Laguna of Tenerife and graduated at the University of Salamanca with a "Bachiller" in 1707 and a "Licenciado" in Law in 1711.

He was nominated as a Surveyor and Controller of the Royal Rents and Taxes in August 1714 in the actual Caracas, Venezuela, in February 1715. In August 1715, he started his lectures on law as the first chair in Caracas, in the Convent of Santa Rosa asked by Archbishop Francisco del Rincón, and in April 1716 married in the Cathedral of Caracas widower Teresa Cecilia de Bertodano Knepper, born 1691. They had two boys and two girls between 1717 and 1721 while in Caracas having another two males after returning to Spain.

He was involved in September 1720 in the wrangle by the Viceroy to destitute the Captain General of the Province of Caracas, Marcos de Bethencourt y Castro, and appointing him as a Governor and Lieutenant of the Captain General, which required a further Order from February 1721 and obeying it by the local authorities as from May 1721. By September, he was replaced and then moved to La Habana (Cuba) and Veracruz (Mexico), towards the end of 1722, coming back to Spain towards the end of 1723. In 1726, he published statements in the sense that the vacant positions in the churches of the Spanish Empire, and therefore the rents and moneys providing their support for whatever earlier reasons, belong to the King ("regalism" from the French churches, hence the marquis title given to him "de la Regalía" by the thankful Bourbon King Philip V of Spain, bringing "over 1 million "reales"" to the Crown).

Meanwhile, his administrative position within the Exchequer rolled on: Casa de Contratación de Cadiz, Finances Council, the Royal Monopolies on Salt, Mines, Mercury, African Slaves, Tobacco, Foreign Trade, China-Mexico trade from Manila (Philippine Islands), Foreign residents and Merchants..... , getting promoted to Marquis in 1738 by King Philip V, heavily mentally handicapped by then, but assisted by loyal commoners and industriously minded nobility.

It is said, that he notified the "Cabildo Council" of the Canary Islands on his promotion to the Castile nobility. However, there was never a reply or official congratulation about his title.

His son, known as Felix José de Abreu Bertodano, (Caracas, 13 July 1721 – circa 1765, aged 45) was also a brilliant merchantilist and writer on economic subjects.
