= José Abreu (second baseman) =

Cuban baseball player

- Second baseman
- Born: 1910; Havana, Cuba

Negro league baseball debut
- 1934, for the Cuban Stars (East)

Last appearance
- 1935, for the Cuban Stars (East)

Teams
- Cuban Stars (East) (1934–1935)

José Abreu (1910–unknown) was a Cuban Negro league baseball player who primarily played second base.

A native of Havana, Cuba, Abreu played for the independent Cuban Stars (East) in 1934 and 1935. In 15 recorded games, he homered and posted seven hits in 61 plate appearances.
