= 2002 Tampa Bay Devil Rays season =

2002 Tampa Bay Devil Rays
- League: American League
- Division: East
- Ballpark: Tropicana Field
- City: St. Petersburg, Florida
- Record: 55–106 (.342)
- Divisional place: 5th
- Owners: Vince Naimoli
- General managers: Chuck LaMar
- Managers: Hal McRae
- Television: FSN Florida; WMOR-TV; WTSP (Joe Magrane, Dewayne Staats, Todd Kalas)
- Radio: WFLA (Paul Olden, Charlie Slowes); WLCC (Ricardo Tavares, Enrique Oliu)

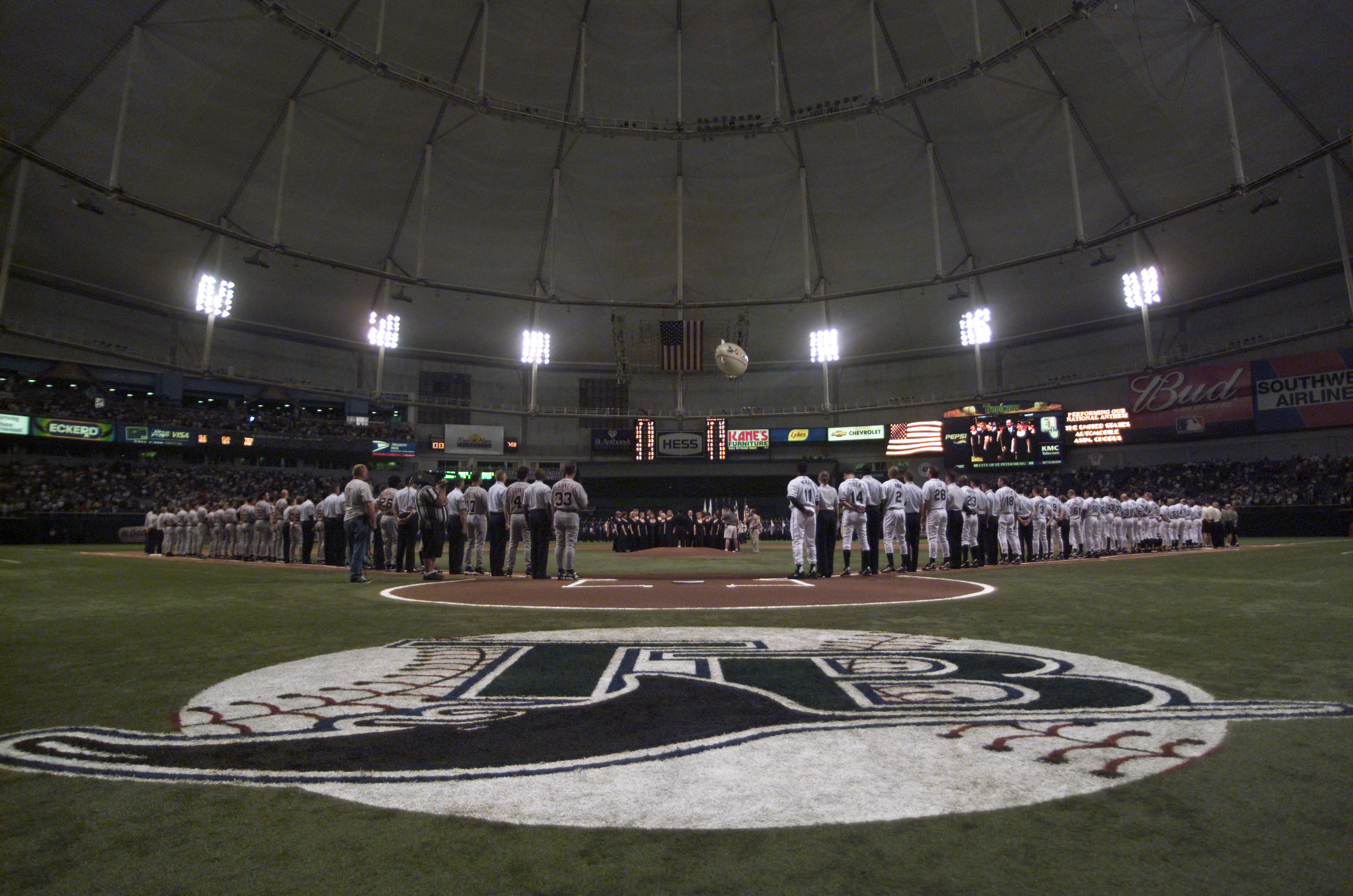
Tropicana Field on Opening Day in 2002

The 2002 Tampa Bay Devil Rays season was their fifth since the franchise was created. This season, they finished last in the American League East, and managed to finish the season with a record of 55–106. Their manager was Hal McRae who entered his first full season and last season with the Devil Rays.

== Offseason ==
- November 8, 2001: Ryan Freel was signed as a free agent with the Tampa Bay Devil Rays.

== Regular season ==
=== Season standings ===
AL East
Team	W	L	Pct.	GB	Home	Road
New York Yankees	103	58	.640	—	52‍–‍28	51‍–‍30
Boston Red Sox	93	69	.574	10½	42‍–‍39	51‍–‍30
Toronto Blue Jays	78	84	.481	25½	42‍–‍39	36‍–‍45
Baltimore Orioles	67	95	.414	36½	34‍–‍47	33‍–‍48
Tampa Bay Devil Rays	55	106	.342	48	30‍–‍51	25‍–‍55

=== American League Wild Card ===
Division leaders
Team	W	L	Pct.
New York Yankees	103	58	.640
Minnesota Twins	94	67	.584
Oakland Athletics	103	59	.636

Wild Card team (Top team qualifies for postseason)
Team	W	L	Pct.	GB
Anaheim Angels	99	63	.611	—
Boston Red Sox	93	69	.574	6
Seattle Mariners	93	69	.574	6
Chicago White Sox	81	81	.500	18
Toronto Blue Jays	78	84	.481	21
Cleveland Indians	74	88	.457	25
Texas Rangers	72	90	.444	27
Baltimore Orioles	67	95	.414	32
Kansas City Royals	62	100	.383	37
Detroit Tigers	55	106	.342	43½
Tampa Bay Devil Rays	55	106	.342	43½

=== Record vs. opponents ===
2002 American League record Source: MLB Standings Grid – 2002
Team	ANA	BAL	BOS	CWS	CLE	DET	KC	MIN	NYY	OAK	SEA	TB	TEX	TOR	NL
Anaheim	—	7–2	3–4	6–3	6–3	8–1	6–3	4–5	3–4	9–11	9–10	8–1	12–7	7–2	11–7
Baltimore	2–7	—	6–13	3–4	1–5	2–4	7–0	5–1	6–13	4–5	5–4	10–9	3–6	4–15	9–9
Boston	4–3	13–6	—	2–4	5–4	5–4	4–2	3–3	9–10	6–3	4–5	16–3	4–3	13–6	5–13
Chicago	3–6	4–3	4–2	—	9–10	12–7	11–8	8–11	2–4	2–7	5–4	4–3	5–4	4–2	8–10
Cleveland	3–6	5–1	4–5	10–9	—	10–9	9–10	8–11	3–6	2–5	3–4	4–2	4–5	3–3	6–12
Detroit	1–8	4–2	4–5	7–12	9–10	—	9–10	4–14	1–8	1–6	2–5	2–4	5–4	0–6	6–12
Kansas City	3–6	0–7	2–4	8–11	10–9	10–9	—	5–14	1–5	1–8	3–6	4–2	7–2	3–4	5–13
Minnesota	5–4	1–5	3–3	11–8	11–8	14–4	14–5	—	0–6	3–6	5–4	5–2	6–3	6–1	10–8
New York	4–3	13–6	10–9	4–2	6–3	8–1	5–1	6–0	—	5–4	4–5	13–5	4–3	10–9	11–7
Oakland	11–9	5–4	3–6	7–2	5–2	6–1	8–1	6–3	4–5	—	8–11	8–1	13–6	3–6	16–2
Seattle	10–9	4–5	5–4	4–5	4–3	5–2	6–3	4–5	5–4	11–8	—	5–4	13–7	6–3	11–7
Tampa Bay	1–8	9–10	3–16	3–4	2–4	4–2	2–4	2–5	5–13	1–8	4–5	—	4–5	8–11	7–11
Texas	7–12	6–3	3–4	4–5	5–4	4–5	2–7	3–6	3–4	6–13	7–13	5–4	—	8–1	9–9
Toronto	2–7	15–4	6–13	2–4	3–3	6–0	4–3	1–6	9–10	6–3	3–6	11–8	1–8	—	9–9

=== Opening Day starters ===
- Brent Abernathy
- Steve Cox
- Chris Gomez
- Ben Grieve
- Toby Hall
- Bob Smith
- Tanyon Sturtze
- Jason Tyner
- Greg Vaughn
- Randy Winn

=== Notable transactions ===
- June 4, 2002: B. J. Upton drafted by the Tampa Bay Devil Rays in the 1st round (2nd pick) of the 2002 amateur draft. Player signed September 16, 2002.
- June 4, 2002: Elijah Dukes drafted by the Tampa Bay Devil Rays in the 3rd round of the 2002 amateur draft. Player signed August 21, 2002.
- September 22, 2002: Released Toe Nash, the day after he was released from jail.

=== Roster ===
2002 Tampa Bay Devil Rays
Roster
Pitchers: 40 Wilson Álvarez; 37 Brandon Backe; 45 Dewon Brazelton; 38 Lance Carter; 46 Jesús Colomé; 38 Doug Creek; 36 Luis de los Santos; 39 Lee Gardner; 58 Travis Harper; 48 Delvin James; 54 Jason Jiménez; 17 Joe Kennedy; 51 Steve Kent; 52 Tom Martin; 61 Travis Phelps; 24 Ryan Rupe; 59 Jorge Sosa; 53 Jason Standridge; 49 Tanyon Sturtze; 41 Paul Wilson; 43 Esteban Yan; 60 Víctor Zambrano	Catchers: 6 John Flaherty; 44 Toby Hall; 15 Paul Hoover; Infielders: 3 Brent Abernathy; 28 Steve Cox; 5 Félix Escalona; 9 Chris Gomez; 19 Aubrey Huff; 25 Russ Johnson; 20 David McCarty; 10 Jared Sandberg; 26 Andy Sheets; 20 Bob Smith; 29 Jason Smith	Outfielders: 4 Jason Conti; 8 Carl Crawford; 18 Ben Grieve; 33 Damian Rolls; 14 Jason Tyner; 23 Greg Vaughn; 2 Randy Winn	Manager: 11 Hal McRae; Coaches: 50 Jackie Brown (pitching); 55 Glenn Ezell (bullpen); 16 Tom Foley (third base); 22 Billy Hatcher (bench); 47 Lee May (first base); 35 Milt May (hitting)

=== Citrus series ===
The annual interleague games between the Florida Marlins and the Tampa Bay Devil Rays were played in June and July. They are known as the Citrus Series. The Devil Rays won the series 4–2.

Date	Winning Team	Losing Team	Score	Venue
June 14	Devil Rays	Marlins	4-3 (14 innings)	Pro Player Stadium
June 15	Marlins	Devil Rays	3-0	Pro Player Stadium
June 16	Devil Rays	Marlins	4-1	Pro Player Stadium
June 28	Devil Rays	Marlins	4-0	Tropicana Field
June 29	Marlins	Devil Rays	3-2	Tropicana Field
June 30	Devil Rays	Marlins	6-5 (12 innings)	Tropicana Field

== Player stats ==
=== Batting ===
==== Starters by position ====
Note: Pos = Position; G = Games played; AB = At bats; H = Hits; Avg. = Batting average; HR = Home runs; RBI = Runs batted in

Pos	Player	G	AB	H	Avg.	HR	RBI
C	Toby Hall	85	330	85	.258	6	42
1B	Steve Cox	148	560	142	.254	16	72
2B	Brent Abernathy	117	463	112	.242	2	40
SS	Chris Gomez	130	461	122	.265	10	46
3B	Jared Sandberg	102	358	82	.229	18	54
LF	Carl Crawford	63	259	67	.259	2	30
CF	Randy Winn	152	607	181	.298	14	75
RF	Ben Grieve	136	482	121	.251	19	64
DH	Aubrey Huff	113	454	142	.313	23	59

==== Other batters ====
Note: G = Games played; AB = At bats; H = Hits; Avg. = Batting average; HR = Home runs; RBI = Runs batted in

Player	G	AB	H	Avg.	HR	RBI
John Flaherty	76	281	73	.260	4	33
Greg Vaughn	69	251	41	.163	8	29
Jason Conti	78	222	57	.257	3	21
Jason Tyner	44	168	36	.214	0	9
Félix Escalona	59	157	34	.217	0	9
Andy Sheets	41	149	37	.248	4	22
Russ Johnson	45	111	24	.216	1	12
Damian Rolls	21	89	26	.292	0	6
Jason Smith	26	65	13	.200	1	6
Bob Smith	18	63	11	.175	1	6
Dave McCarty	12	34	6	.176	1	2
Paul Hoover	5	17	3	.176	0	2

=== Pitching ===
==== Starting pitchers ====
Note: G = Games pitched; IP = Innings pitched; W = Wins; L = Losses; ERA = Earned run average; SO = Strikeouts

Player	G	IP	W	L	ERA	SO
Tanyon Sturtze	33	224.0	4	18	5.18	137
Joe Kennedy	30	196.2	8	11	4.53	109
Paul Wilson	30	193.2	6	12	4.83	111
Ryan Rupe	15	90.0	5	10	5.60	67
Luis de los Santos	3	14.0	0	3	11.57	7
Dewon Brazelton	2	13.0	0	1	4.85	5

==== Other pitchers ====
Note: G = Games pitched; IP = Innings pitched; W = Wins; L = Losses; ERA = Earned run average; SO = Strikeouts

Player	G	IP	W	L	ERA	SO
Victor Zambrano	42	114.0	8	8	5.53	73
Jorge Sosa	31	99.1	2	7	5.53	48
Travis Harper	37	85.2	5	9	5.46	60
Wilson Álvarez	23	75.0	2	3	5.28	56
Delvin James	8	34.1	0	3	6.55	17

==== Relief pitchers ====
Note: G = Games pitched; W = Wins; L = Losses; SV = Saves; ERA = Earned run average; SO = Strikeouts

Player	G	W	L	SV	ERA	SO
Esteban Yan	55	7	8	19	4.30	53
Steve Kent	34	0	2	1	5.65	41
Jesús Colomé	32	2	7	0	8.27	33
Doug Creek	29	2	1	0	6.27	37
Travis Phelps	26	1	2	0	4.78	36
Lee Gardner	12	1	1	0	4.05	8
Brandon Backe	9	0	0	0	6.92	6
Lance Carter	8	2	0	2	1.33	14
Jason Jiménez	5	0	0	0	5.40	5
Tom Martin	2	0	0	0	16.20	1
Jason Standridge	1	0	0	0	9.00	1

== ESPN25 Worst Team of All-Time ==
In 2004, ESPN was celebrating 25 years of the network since its founding in 1979. The network decided to honor the first 25 years from the best to the worst and everything else in between. The Rays were ranked 16th in the actual ESPN Worst Team Result of the first 25 years conducted by ESPN and its users. The users put them higher at 13th than the original airing as the worst team by only 3 spots.

== Farm system ==
Level	Team	League	Manager
AAA	Durham Bulls	International League	Bill Evers
AA	Orlando Rays	Southern League	Mako Oliveras
A	Bakersfield Blaze	California League	Charlie Montoyo
A	Charleston RiverDogs	South Atlantic League	Buddy Biancalana
A-Short Season	Hudson Valley Renegades	New York–Penn League	Dave Howard
Rookie	Princeton Devil Rays	Appalachian League	Edwin Rodríguez

LEAGUE CHAMPIONS: Durham
