= Luis de los Santos =

Luis de los Santos or De Los Santos may refer to:

- Luis de los Santos (first baseman) (born 1966), Dominican baseball player for the Kansas City Royals, Detroit Tigers and other clubs
- Luis de los Santos (pitcher) (born 1977), Dominican baseball player for the Tampa Bay Devil Rays
- Luis De Los Santos (third baseman) (born 1998), Dominican baseball player for the New York Mets
