= Dave Martinez =

American baseball player and manager (born 1964)

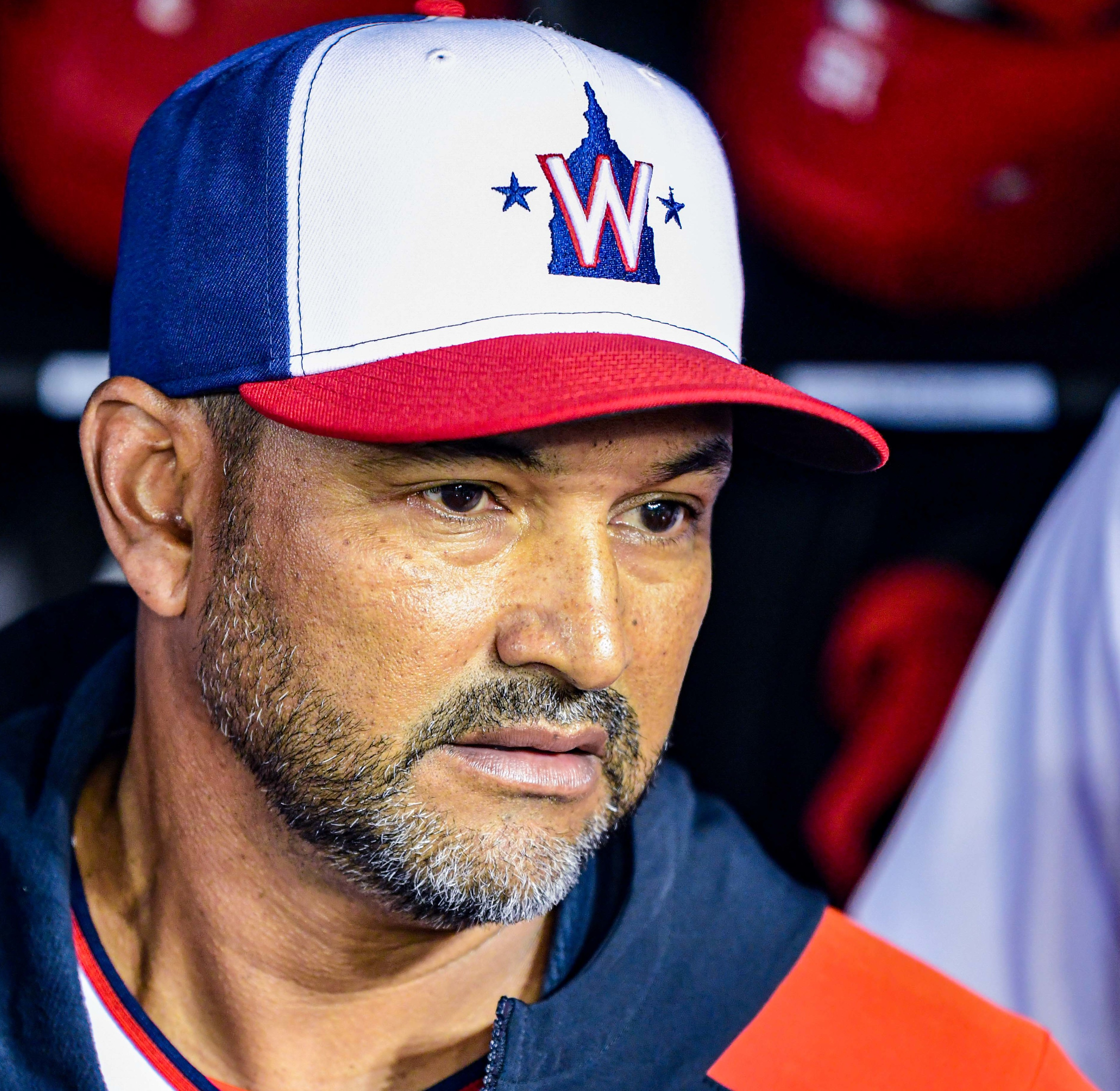
- Martinez with the Washington Nationals in 2022
- Outfielder / Manager
- Born: September 26, 1964 (age 62); New York City, U.S.
- Batted: Left Threw: Left

MLB debut
- June 15, 1986, for the Chicago Cubs

Last MLB appearance
- October 7, 2001, for the Atlanta Braves

MLB statistics
- Batting average: .276
- Home runs: 91
- Runs batted in: 580
- Managerial record: 500–622
- Winning %: .446
- Stats at Baseball Reference
- Managerial record at Baseball Reference

Teams
- As player: Chicago Cubs (1986–1988); Montreal Expos (1988–1991); Cincinnati Reds (1992); San Francisco Giants (1993–1994); Chicago White Sox (1995–1997); Tampa Bay Devil Rays (1998–2000); Chicago Cubs (2000); Texas Rangers (2000); Toronto Blue Jays (2000); Atlanta Braves (2001); As manager: Washington Nationals (2018–2025); As coach: Tampa Bay Rays (2008–2014); Chicago Cubs (2015–2017)

Career highlights and awards
- 2× World Series champion (2016, 2019)

David Martinez (born September 26, 1964) is an American former professional baseball manager and outfielder who most recently managed the Washington Nationals of Major League Baseball (MLB). He previously served as the bench coach for the Tampa Bay Rays and Chicago Cubs. He played in MLB for the Cubs, Montreal Expos, Cincinnati Reds, San Francisco Giants, Chicago White Sox, Tampa Bay Devil Rays, Texas Rangers, Toronto Blue Jays, and Atlanta Braves from 1986 to 2001. Martinez had a .276 career batting average, 1,599 hits, 91 home runs, 795 runs scored, and 580 runs batted in.

Martinez became the bench coach for the Rays in 2008, under manager Joe Maddon. When Maddon became manager of the Cubs after the 2014 season, Martinez joined him there as bench coach. The Nationals hired Martinez as their manager after the 2017 season and won the 2019 World Series in his second season with the team. Martinez spent eight seasons with the Nationals before his firing in the middle of the 2025 season.

== Early life ==
Martinez was born on September 26, 1964, in Brooklyn, a borough of New York City. His parents are Puerto Rican. Martinez lived at East 93rd Street and Lexington Avenue in Manhattan. He then lived in Brentwood, New York on Long Island, and played little league for BYA (Brentwood Youth Activities). At age 13, his family moved to Orlando, Florida, at the recommendation of one of his uncles.

Martinez attended Lake Howell High School. He played on the school's baseball team, which won the Five Star Conference championship in 1981. He then enrolled at Valencia Community College, where he played college baseball.

== Professional playing career ==
The Chicago Cubs selected Martinez in the January phase of the 1983 Major League Baseball draft. After he signed, he played for the Geneva Cubs of the Class A-Short Season New York–Penn League and the Quad Cities Cubs of the Class A Midwest League. He began the 1984 season with Quad Cities, and in 1985, he received a promotion to the Winston-Salem Spirits of the Class A-Advanced Carolina League. Martinez led the Carolina League with a .342 batting average; the second-place finishers, Keith Miller and John Wilson, batted .302. Martinez began the 1986 season with the Iowa Cubs of the Class AAA American Association.

The Cubs promoted Martinez to the major leagues for the first time on June 15, 1986, and he served as an injury replacement for Bob Dernier. He had a .119 batting average (8-for-67) before he was optioned back to the minor leagues in August. Martinez made the Cubs major league roster in 1987, splitting time in center field with Dernier. He batted .292 in 142 games. Martinez struggled in the 1988 season, batting .230 in mid-June. On July 14, 1988, Martinez was traded to the Montreal Expos in exchange for Mitch Webster. He finished 1988 with a .255 batting average and 23 stolen bases.

Martinez was pegged as a platoon player in Montreal, as he batted against right-handed pitchers and sat against left-handed pitchers. The Expos also had outfielders Otis Nixon, Marquis Grissom, and Larry Walker on their roster. He played 126 games in 1989, hitting .274. In 1990, Martinez lost the competition for the center field job to Grissom. However, Grissom was injured, and Martinez platooned with Nixon in center field. Martinez batted .279 with 11 home runs in 118 games in 1990. He batted .295 in 1991. After the 1991 season, the Expos traded Martinez with Willie Greene and Scott Ruskin to the Cincinnati Reds for Bill Risley and John Wetteland. He was sought out as a replacement for Eric Davis for the Reds. He competed with Reggie Sanders for the starting job during spring training.

Martinez played for Cincinnati in 1992, but as Sanders established himself as the Reds' starting center fielder, Martinez declared for free agency after the season. He signed with the San Francisco Giants on a two-year contract for the 1993 and 1994 seasons. He suffered a torn hamstring in 1993 and was limited to 91 games. He hit .241, his lowest average in several seasons. The Giants waived Martinez in October 1994 after he was held to a .247 average, four home runs and 27 runs batted in (RBIs).

Martinez signed a one-year, $500,000 contract with the Chicago White Sox for the 1995 season. He received limited playing time under manager Gene Lamont. When Lamont was replaced by Terry Bevington, Martinez saw an increase in playing time. He signed a two-year $1.425 million contract for the 1996 and 1997 seasons. He spent the 1996 season as a backup behind Darren Lewis, Tony Phillips, and Danny Tartabull, along with fellow backup Lyle Mouton.

In 1997, Martinez batted, .286 and set career highs with 12 home runs and 55 RBIs. He then signed a two-year contract with the expansion Tampa Bay Devil Rays worth $3.5 million with an option for a third season at $1.75 million. In addition his desire to play in Florida, he was enticed by the Rays' additions of Fred McGriff, Wilson Álvarez, and Roberto Hernández. In 1998, he recorded the first hit in Tampa history. His contract option for the 2000 season vested when he recorded his 500th at bat of the 1999 season.

After batting .260 in his first 29 games of the 2000 season, the Devil Rays, who needed to improve their pitching staff, traded Martinez to the Cubs for Mark Guthrie and cash. On June 9, 2000, the Cubs traded Martinez to the Texas Rangers in a three team trade that sent Chuck Smith from the Florida Marlins to the Rangers and Brant Brown from the Marlins to the Cubs. On August 4, 2000, the Rangers traded Martinez to the Toronto Blue Jays for a player to be named later. The Blue Jays sent Peter Munro to the Rangers to complete the trade. By playing for four MLB teams in one season, Martinez tied the record. Since 1901, the previous players to play for four MLB teams in a season were Frank Huelsman (1904), Willis Hudlin (1940), Paul Lehner (1951), Wes Covington (1961), Mike Kilkenny (1972), and Dave Kingman (1977). Dan Miceli (2003) and José Bautista (2004) later achieved the feat. With Toronto, he filled in for the injured Raúl Mondesí as the Blue Jays contended for the American League wild card. Between the four teams, he had a .274 batting average, five home runs, and 47 runs batted in (RBIs) in 132 games. He is one of the few players to play for both major league Canadian teams, the Toronto Blue Jays and the Montreal Expos.

Martinez signed with the Atlanta Braves on a two-year contract covering the 2001 and 2002 seasons, valued at approximately $3 million. He batted .328 in the first half of the 2001 season, but only .233 in the second half. Late in the year, he was diagnosed with chronic tendinitis in the patella. He appeared in the MLB postseason for the only time in his career, as he played in the 2001 National League Division Series, as the Braves defeated the Houston Astros, and the 2001 National League Championship Series, where the Braves lost to the Arizona Diamondbacks. Martinez returned to the Braves in 2002, but missed the entire season after he injured his right knee during spring training. He announced his retirement. In 1,919 games played, Martinez had a .276 career batting average, 1,599 hits, 91 home runs, 795 runs scored, and 580 RBIs.

== Coaching career ==
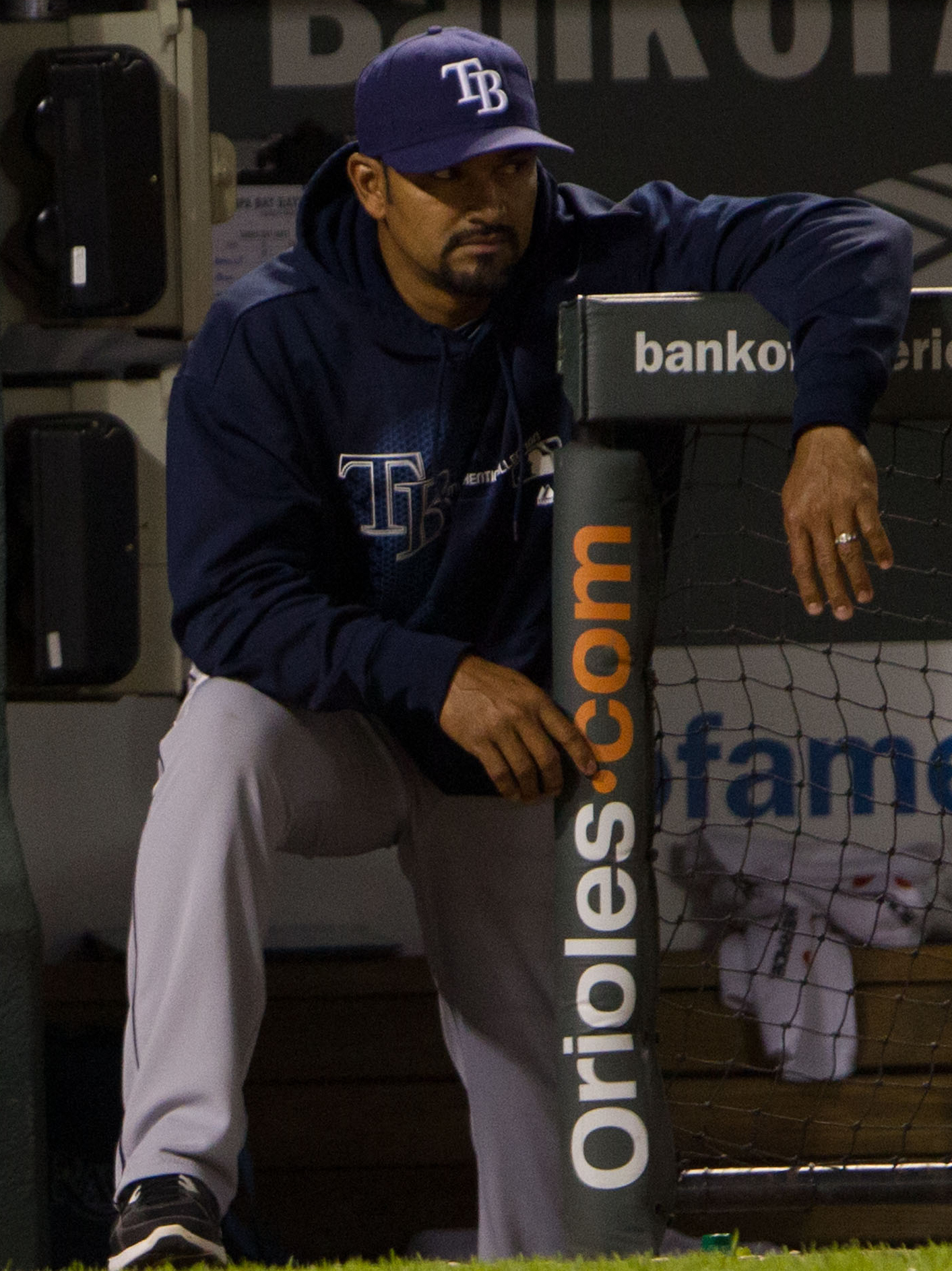
Martinez with the Tampa Bay Rays in 2012

Martinez worked for the Tampa Bay Rays as a spring training instructor in 2006 and 2007. On October 11, 2007, the Rays hired him as their bench coach, in which capacity he was in charge of defensive positioning and worked with the Rays' players on bunting and baserunning. The Rays won the American League championship in 2008 and advanced to the 2008 World Series, which they lost to the Philadelphia Phillies. The following season, Martinez participated in the 2009 Major League Baseball All-Star Game as a member of the American League team's coaching staff.

Martinez interviewed for managerial positions with Toronto and the Cleveland Indians during the 2010–2011 offseason. During the 2011–2012 offseason, Martinez interviewed for the White Sox's managerial position. The White Sox hired Robin Ventura. After the 2012 season, Martinez was considered for the Astros' managerial position, which went to Bo Porter. During the 2013–2014 offseason, Martinez interviewed for the Cubs' managerial position, which went to Rick Renteria, and the Washington Nationals' managerial position, which went to Matt Williams.

Rays manager Joe Maddon opted out of his contract with Tampa Bay after the 2014 season. The Rays sought feedback from their players on who should manage the team. Evan Longoria, Alex Cobb, and Ben Zobrist endorsed Martinez. Martinez interviewed for the position, but was not among the Rays' three finalists. Martinez announced his intention to leave the Rays. On December 4, 2014, the Cubs hired him to serve as their bench coach under Maddon. In 2016, Martinez was part of the Cubs' coaching staff that led the team to winning the 2016 World Series, breaking a 108-year long drought. He participated in the 2017 Major League Baseball All-Star Game as a member of the National League team's coaching staff.

== Managerial career ==
=== Washington Nationals ===
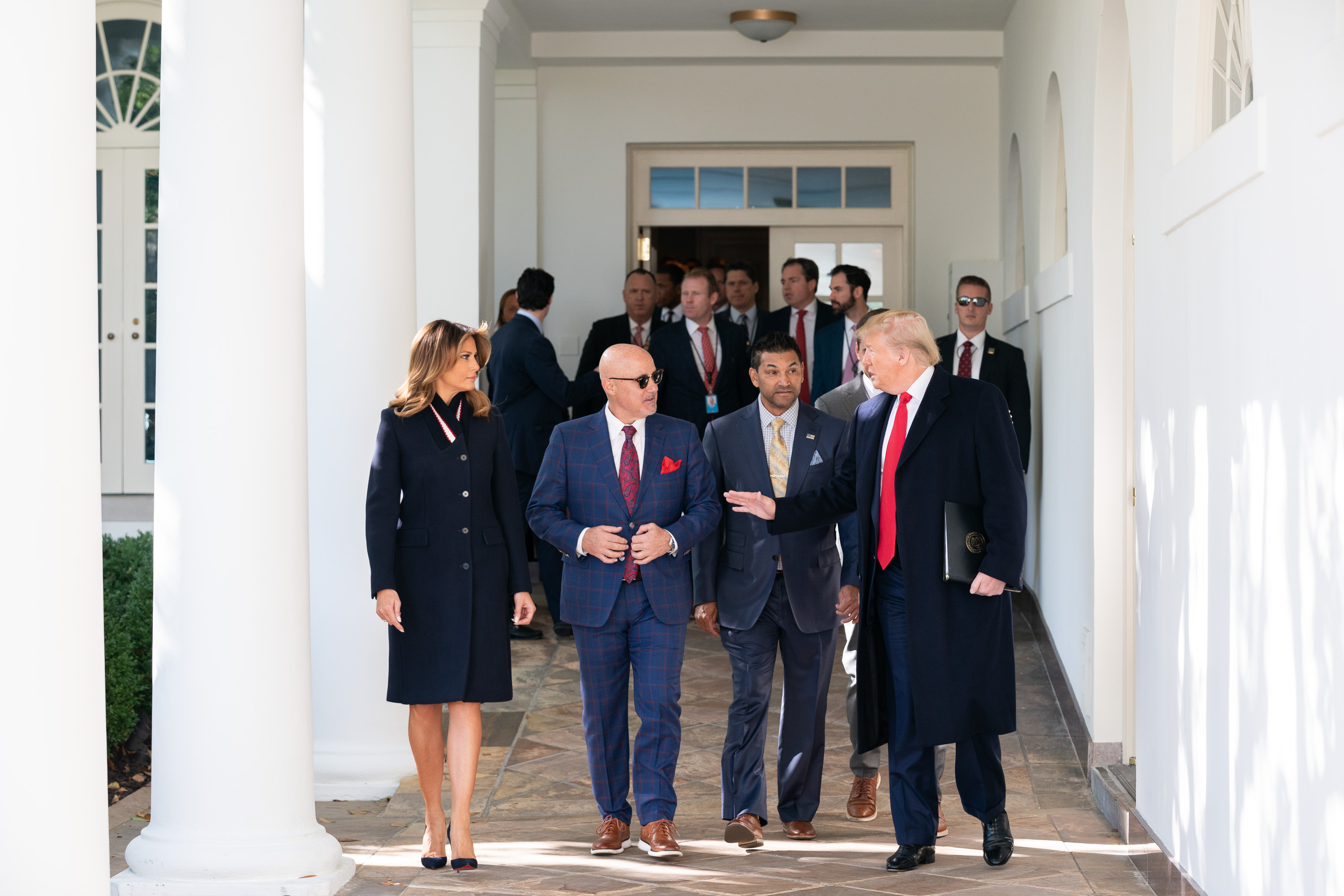
President Trump and First Lady Melania Trump walking with Nationals General Manager Mike Rizzo and Martinez before attending the celebration of the 2019 World Series Champions, the Washington Nationals on the South Lawn

The Washington Nationals elected not to extend manager Dusty Baker's contract after a second consecutive season in which the Nationals reached the National League Division Series and lost in five games (in 2016 to the Los Angeles Dodgers; in 2017 to Martinez's Cubs). Martinez was one of just a handful of candidates mentioned for the open managerial job. On October 30, 2017, the Nationals announced they had come to terms with Martinez on a three-year manager contract starting with the 2018 season, with a club option for the 2021 season.

Martinez returned to the Expos/Nationals franchise after playing with the club from 1988 to 1991, when it had played as the Expos. He earned his first win as a major league manager in his first career game managed, as the Nationals shut out the Cincinnati Reds 2–0 on March 30, 2018, to begin the season. Throughout his first season, Martinez made strategic lineup moves; placing Bryce Harper in the leadoff spot for the first time in over four years on May 1, 2018, and allowing ace Max Scherzer to throw 121 pitches on May 19, 2018. The Nationals finished the 2018 season with an 82–80 record. Martinez participated in the 2018 Major League Baseball All-Star Game, held at Nationals Park in Washington, D.C., as a member of the National League team's coaching staff.

The Nationals began the 2019 season with a 19–31 record and public calls began for Martinez to be fired. However, the Nationals rebounded, finished the season in second place in the National League East with a record of 93–69, and earned a wild-card spot in the playoffs. The Nationals then defeated the Milwaukee Brewers in the Wild Card Game, the Los Angeles Dodgers three games to two in the National League Division Series, and the St. Louis Cardinals in four games in the National League Championship Series, advancing to the 2019 World Series. In Game 6 of the best-of-seven series, Martinez was ejected after an argument with an umpire over a controversial call. The next night, Martinez and the Nationals captured the 2019 World Series championship by defeating the Houston Astros in Game 7. The Nationals won all four games as the visiting team, the first time that this happened in a World Series.

As the manager of the team that won the 2019 National League championship, Martinez was slated to manage the National League team in the 2020 Major League Baseball All-Star Game. However, the COVID-19 pandemic prompted Major League Baseball to delay the start of the 2020 season and cancel the 2020 All-Star Game, and Martinez missed his chance to manage in the game. After the 2020 season began, he had his pitching staff issue intentional walks at a higher rate than any other major league manager. The Nationals finished the season, shortened by the pandemic, in fourth place with a record of 28–34. The team then began a rebuilding process and finished in fifth place in 2021 with a record of 65–97.

On July 2, 2022, the Nationals exercised Martinez's option for the 2023 season. On July 19, he took part in the 2022 Major League Baseball All-Star Game as a member of the National League team's coaching staff. As the Nationals' rebuilding effort lengthened, Washington finished the 2022 season in fifth place with a record of 55–107, the worst in MLB that season and the team's worst record since arriving in Washington for the 2005 season.

Between June 24 and August 21, 2023, the Nationals posted a record of 29–21, and between August 2 and 21 they won 12 of 17 games. They had won seven of their last nine games when the press reported on August 21 that the Nationals and Martinez had agreed to an extension of Martinez's contract through 2025, with a club option for 2026. The Nationals announced the extension on August 22. The team finished in fifth place again in 2023 and in fourth place in 2024, with identical records of 71–91 in both seasons.

After a 37–53 start to the 2025 season, Martinez was fired on July 6, 2025, alongside general manager and team president Mike Rizzo. Martinez compiled a record of 500–622 in eight seasons with the team.

=== Managerial record ===
As of games played on July 6, 2025

Team	Year	Regular season					Postseason			
Team	Year	Games	Won	Lost	Win %	Finish	Won	Lost	Win %	Result
WAS	2018	162	82	80	.506	2nd in NL East	–	–	–	–
WAS	2019	162	93	69	.574	2nd in NL East	12	5	.706	Won World Series (HOU)
WAS	2020	60	26	34	.433	4th in NL East	–	–	–	–
WAS	2021	162	65	97	.401	5th in NL East	–	–	–	–
WAS	2022	162	55	107	.340	5th in NL East	–	–	–	–
WAS	2023	162	71	91	.438	5th in NL East	–	–	–	–
WAS	2024	162	71	91	.438	4th in NL East	–	–	–	–
WAS	2025	90	37	53	.417	Fired	–	–	–	–
Total		1,122	500	622	.446		12	5	.706	

== Personal life ==
Martinez resides in Safety Harbor, Florida, a suburb of Tampa, and has four children and two granddaughters. Jagger attended the University of Tampa, where he played for the school's soccer team. Dalton played baseball at the College of Central Florida in 2014. The family also provided a second home to Dalton's best friend Mike Love. In September 2019, Dave Martinez underwent a cardiac catheterization after experiencing chest pains during a win over the Atlanta Braves.

Sporting positions
Preceded by Bill Evers	Tampa Bay Rays bench coach 2008–2014	Succeeded by Tom Foley
Preceded by Brandon Hyde	Chicago Cubs bench coach 2015–2017	Succeeded by Brandon Hyde
