= History of the Tampa Bay Rays =

The Tampa Bay Rays are an American professional baseball team based in St. Petersburg, Florida. They compete in Major League Baseball (MLB) as a member of the American League (AL) East division. Since its inception, the team's home venue has been Tropicana Field.

Following nearly three decades of unsuccessfully trying to gain an expansion franchise or enticing existing teams to relocate to the Tampa Bay area, an ownership group led by Vince Naimoli was approved on March 9, 1995. The Tampa Bay Devil Rays began play in the 1998 Major League Baseball season.

The team's first decade of matches was marked by futility; they finished in last place in the AL East in all but the 2004 season, when they finished second to last. Following the 2007 season, Stuart Sternberg, who had purchased controlling interest in the team from Vince Naimoli two years earlier, shortening the team's name from "Devil Rays" to "Rays", now meant to primarily refer to a burst of sunshine rather than a manta ray, though a manta ray logo remains on the uniform sleeves. The 2008 season saw the Tampa Bay Rays post their first winning season, their first AL East championship, and their first American League pennant (defeating the rival Boston Red Sox in the ALCS), though they lost to the Philadelphia Phillies in that year's World Series. Since then, the Rays have played in the postseason in 2010, 2011, 2013, 2019, 2020, 2021, and 2026. The franchise reached its second World Series in 2020.

== Before 1998: Getting a team ==
The Devil Rays began to build their organization shortly after the franchise was awarded in 1995 by naming former Atlanta Braves assistant general manager Chuck LaMar the senior vice president of baseball operations and general manager. The franchise's first minor league games took place in the 1996 season. On November 7, 1997, Larry Rothschild was named the team's first manager. The team acquired 35 players in the Expansion Draft on November 18, 1997. Tony Saunders from the Florida Marlins was the first player drafted by the Devil Rays. The team also drafted future star Bobby Abreu but traded him to the Philadelphia Phillies for Kevin Stocker, who had very little success for the Rays. Before the 1998 season, veteran stars Wade Boggs, Fred McGriff, and Wilson Álvarez were acquired.

== 1998–2003: Early years as the Devil Rays ==
The Devil Rays played their first game on March 31, 1998 against the Detroit Tigers at Tropicana Field before a crowd of 45,369. Wilson Álvarez threw the first pitch and Wade Boggs hit the first home run in team history that day. Despite losing their opening game 11–6, the team actually got off to a respectable start and were 11–8 after 19 before losing six straight and falling below .500. They would go on to lose 99 games that year. One of the first memorable moments in franchise history occurred on August 7, 1999 when Wade Boggs tallied his 3000th career hit, the first player to do so with a home run. Boggs retired after the season and was the first Ray with his number retired. He was inducted into the Baseball Hall of Fame in 2005.

The Devil Rays acquired sluggers Vinny Castilla, Jose Canseco and Greg Vaughn; along with incumbent Fred McGriff, this quartet was dubbed the "Hit Show". However, all of these players were past their prime and unable to sustain their previous successes. The Devil Rays continued to struggle in 1999 and 2000. Prior to the 2001 season, they modified their team colors and uniforms and also acquired highly touted outfielder Ben Grieve from Oakland. Early in the 2001 season, Larry Rothschild was fired as manager and was replaced by Hal McRae, and McGriff was dealt to the Chicago Cubs. By the 2002 season, the Devil Rays decided to rebuild with younger players and drastically reduced the team payroll. Randy Winn, Aubrey Huff, Toby Hall, and Carl Crawford began to emerge as key players. However, the 2002 season would prove to be the worst in franchise history to date. McRae was moved to a front office position after the season.

Before the 2003 season, the team traded Randy Winn to the Seattle Mariners for the right to negotiate with manager Lou Piniella, a Tampa native, who managed winning teams at every stop in his managerial career, including the New York Yankees, the Cincinnati Reds (whom he led to a World Series Trophy in 1990), and the Mariners. Piniella was attracted to the Tampa Bay job because of the proximity to his family and the chance to build a losing franchise into a winner as he had done in Seattle. Piniella's first team still came in last place, but finished seven games better than the 2002 team. A highlight of the 2003 season was the emergence of Rocco Baldelli, a native of Rhode Island, as one of the top rookies in the major leagues.

== 2004–2007: Continued struggles, a new manager ==
When Entering the 2004 Tampa Bay Devil Rays season, The expectations for the Devil Rays were low, but the team won 70 games for the first time and finished in 4th place in the American League East, out of last place for the first time. Entering May, the team was 10–28 before going on to win 30 of 40 games, including a team-record 12-game winning streak. The Devil Rays peaked at 42–41 but the team was unable to sustain that success and finished 21 games below .500.

Following a 28–61 record at the All-Star Break in the 2005 Tampa Bay Devil Rays season, the Devil Rays went 39–34 for a final record of 67–95. Carl Crawford and newcomers Jorge Cantú and Jonny Gomes led a productive offense that finished third in the American League in team batting average. However, the pitching staff had the second-worst ERA in the American League. Despite the promising finish, Lou Piniella became frustrated with what he perceived as an insufficient commitment to winning by the ownership group, and he reached a settlement with the team to release him from the last year of his contract and Angels coach Joe Maddon was named manager, the fourth in team history.

Shortly after the season ended, new owner Stuart Sternberg, immediately fired Chuck LaMar along with most of the front office. Matthew Silverman was named the team president, and Andrew Friedman took the role of Executive Vice President of Baseball Operations. Sternberg decided not to have a de jure General Manager, calling the position "outdated".

With the change of ownership and the strong finish to the 2005 season, Tampa Bay fans were optimistic about the 2006 Tampa Bay Devil Rays season. The official attendance for the Devil Rays' home opener was 40,199, the highest turnout since the 1998 inaugural season home opener. At the All-Star break, Tampa Bay was only 11 games under the .500 mark (39–50). However, the front office became convinced that the Devil Rays would not contend in 2006 and they traded several veteran players and the Devil Rays struggled in the second half particularly on the road, and finished with a league worst 61–101 record.

The Devil Rays were involved in two unusual triple plays in 2006; one they hit into, the other they executed themselves. On June 11 against Kansas City, they hit into the third triple play in major league history, and first since 1937, that involved an appeal. Russell Branyan flied out to center, Rocco Baldelli tried to advance to second base and was thrown out, and then Aubrey Huff was called out when the umpires ruled that he left third base early when he tagged up. Then, on September 2 against Seattle, the Devil Rays executed a 2–6–2 triple play where the ball never touched the bat, something that had never been done before. The triple play involved a strikeout and two baserunners caught off base. Tampa Bay pitcher J. P. Howell struck out Raúl Ibañez. Catcher Dioner Navarro fired the ball to shortstop Ben Zobrist, who tagged out Adrián Beltré trying to steal second base. During that throw, José López tried to go home from third, but Zobrist returned the ball to Navarro in time to put Lopez out at the plate, completing the first 2–6–2 triple play in MLB history. The Devil Rays finished with a winning record at home (41–40) for the first time ever and home attendance increased by 20% from 2005.

In the 2006–07 off-season, the Devil Rays won the rights to Japanese infielder Akinori Iwamura. and signed him to a three-year contract.

In an effort to court the Orlando, Florida, market, the Devil Rays played a series at The Ballpark (now called Champion Stadium) at Disney's Wide World of Sports Complex in the 2007 Tampa Bay Devil Rays season. The series selected was the May 15–17 series versus the Texas Rangers. The Devil Rays swept the Rangers in that series.

In the 2007 Tampa Bay Devil Rays season, the Devil Rays had the youngest starting line-up since the 1983 Minnesota Twins. The Rays had several bright spots on the year as they were led by pitchers James Shields and Scott Kazmir but with a poor bullpen the Rays compiled the worst record in baseball (66–96), finishing last in the American League East for the ninth time in their 10-season existence.

== 2008–2014: Finally a contender ==
=== 2008: New name, uniforms, outlook, results, American League champions and first World Series appearance ===
Prior to the 2008 season the team unveiled new uniforms along with a name change. After considering other options such as the "Aces", "Bandits", "Cannons", "Dukes", "Stripes", and Stuart Sternberg's personal favorite, the "Nine", the team's new name was officially announced to be the "Tampa Bay Rays". The new team colors were "navy, Columbia blue and a touch of gold" and a new team logo featured a bright yellow sunburst symbolizing the Sunshine State of Florida. Following a front office promise to increase the team's payroll, it was raised to $43 million.

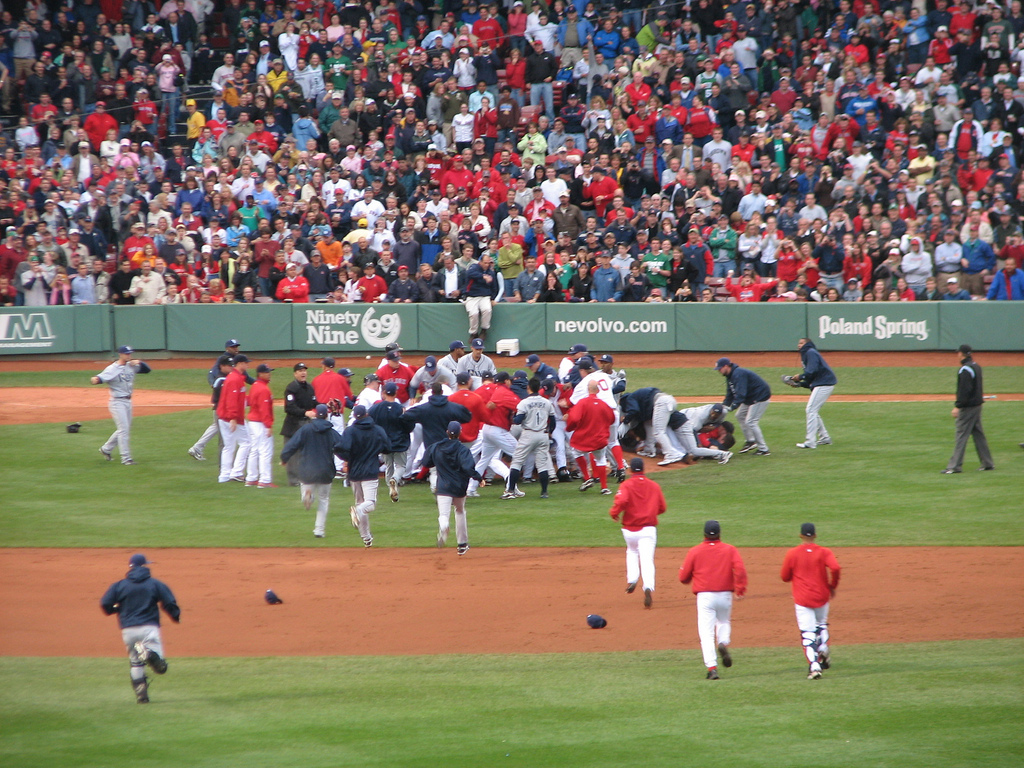
Rays and Red Sox fighting at Fenway Park on June 5, 2008

The Rays lineup remained largely intact from 2007, several key trades and free agent signings improved the team, additions included Matt Garza, Jason Bartlett, and veteran relief pitcher and closer Troy Percival. Top third-base prospect Evan Longoria was expected to be the starter at the hot corner while the Rays also signed the #1 pick from the previous year's draft, pitcher David Price, who was widely recognized as one of the top players in college baseball.

The Rays finished spring training with a club record 18 wins and tied for highest winning percentage in the Grapefruit League. They began the season with a win in Baltimore and snapped a 7-game losing streak in road openers.

As they did during the 2007 season, the Rays played a regular season home series at Champion Stadium in Walt Disney World for the April 22–24 series against the Toronto Blue Jays. As in the Orlando series in the previous season, the Rays won all three games and followed with their first-ever sweep of the Boston Red Sox in Tropicana Field.

The Rays became the first team in modern Major League history (since 1900) to hold the best record in the league through Memorial Day, after having the worst record in the league the year before. This marked the best start in franchise history and the first time ever that the team was 11 games over .500. In June, incidents over the course of two consecutive games led to a bench-clearing brawl against the Boston Red Sox at Fenway Park, in which Coco Crisp charged the mound after being hit by a pitch by James Shields.

Within the first week of July the Rays stretched their division lead to 5 1/2 games, but then lost seven consecutive games heading into the All-Star Break. Trailing the Red Sox for the division lead by 1/2 game, they still led the Wild Card. Scott Kazmir and Dioner Navarro were selected to play in the All-Star Game. Evan Longoria was voted into the roster by the fans in the Final Vote giving the Rays a team record for All-Stars. In another franchise first, Longoria participated in the Home Run Derby.

Despite injuries to several key players in early August including Evan Longoria, Carl Crawford, and Troy Percival, the Rays finished August on a 5-game winning streak, compiling a record of 21–7 for the month, the best single month in franchise history. With an 84–51 overall record, the best in the league, their lead in the division grew to 5 1/2 games going into the final month of the season.

On September 20, the Rays, with the best home record in Major League Baseball, clinched their first-ever postseason berth in franchise history and clinched the AL East Pennant shortly thereafter.

In the American League Division Series the Rays defeated the Chicago White Sox in 4 games, clinching their first playoff series victory and advanced to the American League Championship Series (ALCS) where they defeated the Boston Red Sox in 7 games to go to the World Series for the first time. Despite having home-field advantage in the series, the Rays lost to the Philadelphia Phillies, four games to one, in the World Series.

The Rays' turnaround was mostly credited to much improved defense and pitching. The Rays also stole 142 bases, more than any other team in the AL. They also had five pitchers throw over 150 innings, more than any other team in baseball: Shields, Kazmir, Garza, Andy Sonnanstine, and Edwin Jackson. While the 2007 bullpen and defense were historically bad, stats for 2008 were among the best in the majors, and the best in franchise history.

=== 2009: Defending the American League crown ===
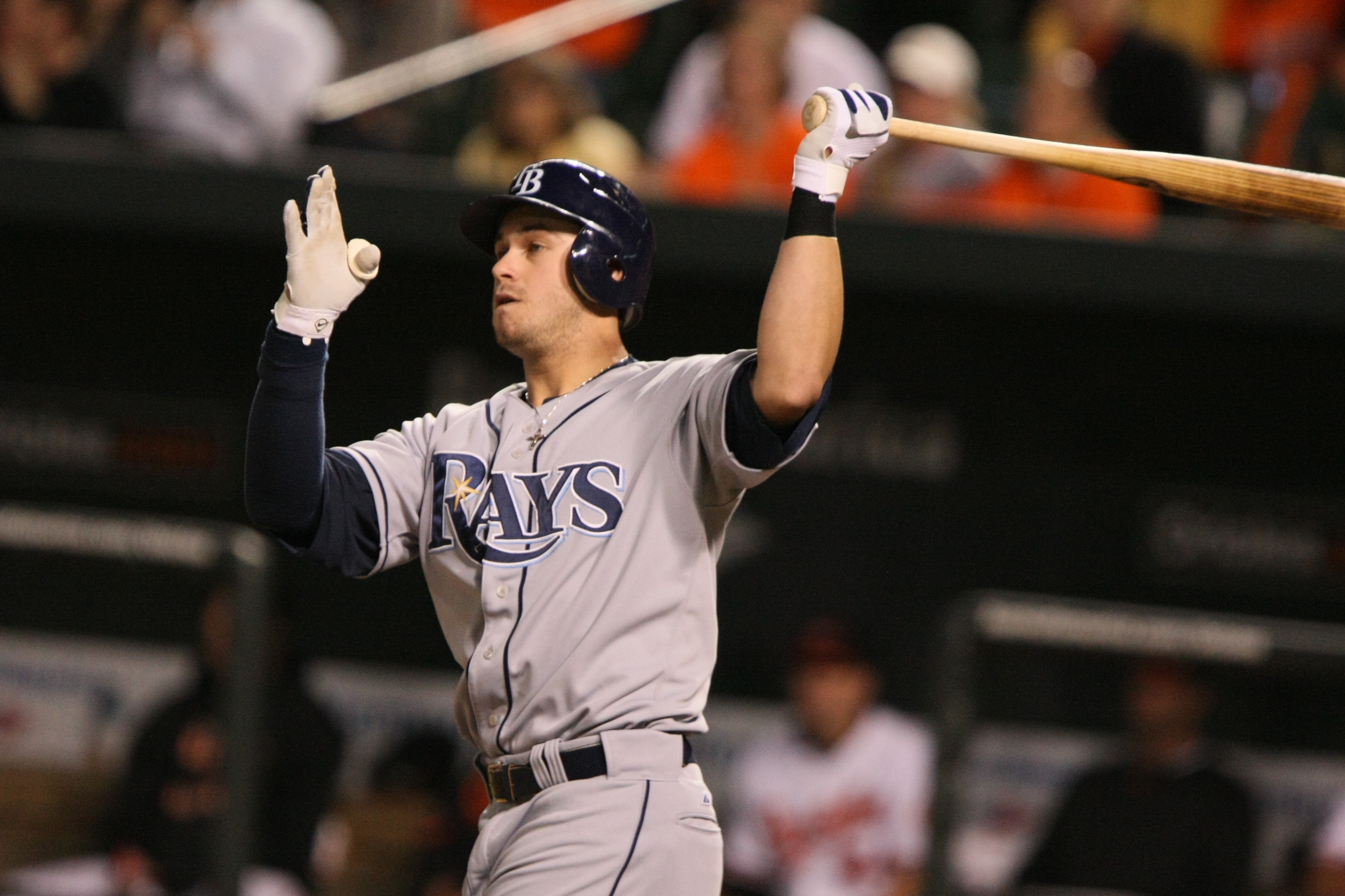
Evan Longoria in 2009

With the Rays' new payroll total above $60 million, principal owner Stuart Sternberg announced that unlike previous seasons the Rays had no more flexibility to make additions during the upcoming season. In the 2008 season, despite the Rays being contenders the entire season, attendance was still among the lowest in the league. Sternberg also stated the only team that did not have an average attendance higher than the league average in the season following a World Series appearance was the Florida Marlins, who did so twice after each of their championship seasons. He accepted that the Rays might become the third occurrence, saying about the 2008 season, "it wasn't the best year to win", because of the current state of the economy.

Following a lackluster start the Rays finished May with an overall record of 25–28 and just half a game out of last place but pulled within 4 games of the AL East and 1 1/2 back in the wild card toward the All-Star break. Carl Crawford, Jason Bartlett, Ben Zobrist, and Evan Longoria were named as All-Stars for the American League in the All-Star Game with Longoria earning the start at third base but was unable to play due to injury. Carlos Peña was added as an injury replacement and participated in the 2009 Home Run Derby. In the All-Star Game Carl Crawford won MVP honors by making a leaping catch at the wall to take away Brad Hawpe's home run.

In August Iwamura returned from injuries sustained in May and the Rays traded Scott Kazmir to the Angels for two minor league prospects and a player to be named later. Kazmir left the team as the all-time leader in wins and strikeouts.

The Rays stumbled in September, losing 11 games in a row at one point, and lost Carlos Peña for the remainder of the season to a broken finger from a hit by pitch. At the time Peña was leading the American League in home runs. The Rays clinched a winning season but the team did not make the post-season finishing with an 84–78 record, good enough for 3rd place. On October 2 B.J. Upton became the first Tampa Bay player to hit for the cycle.

After the 2009 season second baseman Akinori Iwamura was traded to the Pittsburgh Pirates for relief pitcher Jesse Chavez who was then traded to the Atlanta Braves for closer Rafael Soriano.

=== 2010: Return to Division champions ===
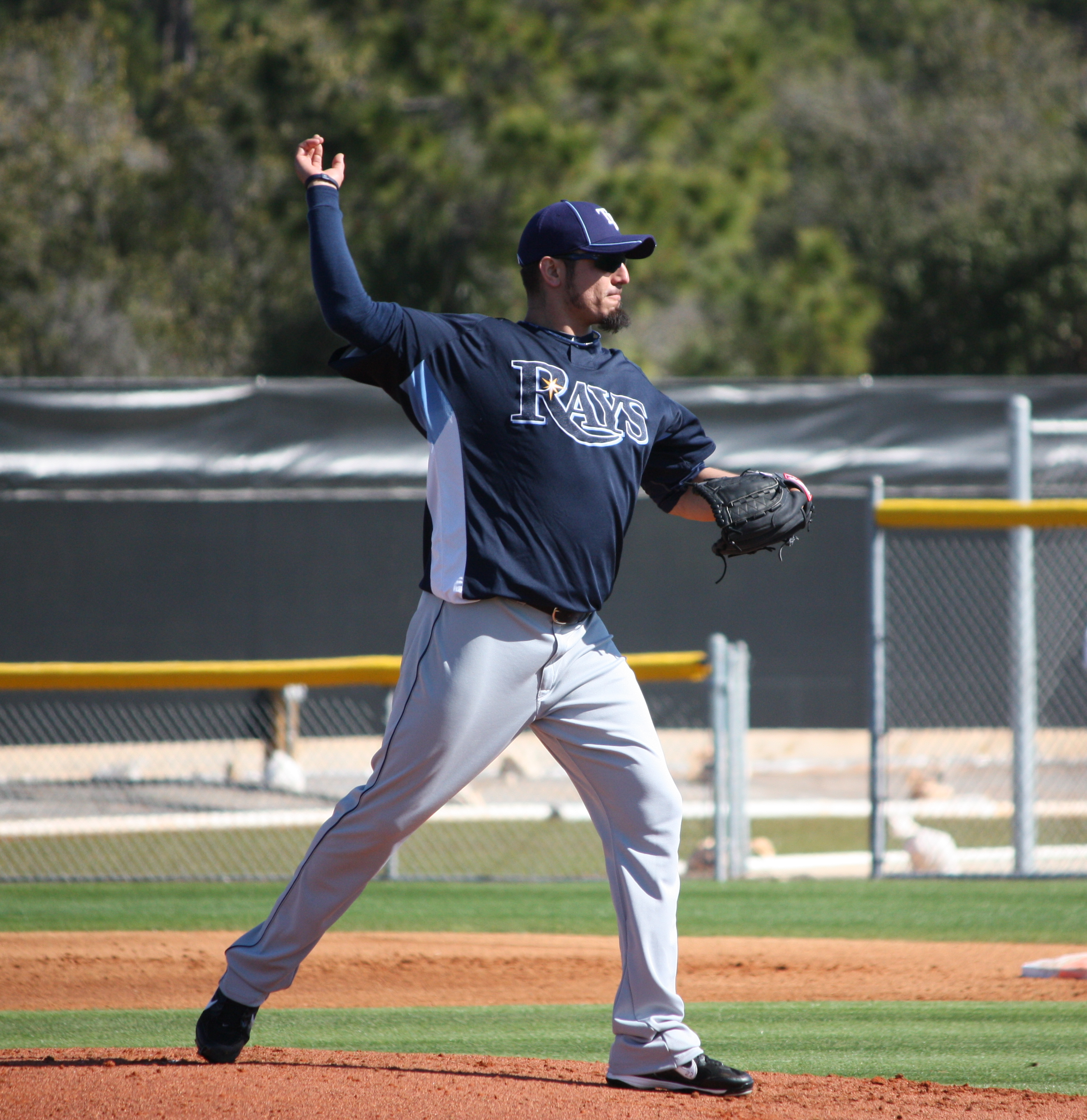
Matt Garza during his tenure with the Tampa Bay Rays in 2010 spring training

In spring training the Rays finished with the best record in the Grapefruit League and set a franchise record for wins in spring training. Second baseman Sean Rodriguez, who had been acquired in the Scott Kazmir trade with the Angels, was considered a breakout player during the spring, on both the offensive and defensive side of the ball.

Although the Rays had the league-best record at the time, Dallas Braden of the Oakland Athletics threw a perfect game against the Rays in May. It was the league's second perfect game in a row thrown against Tampa Bay, the last being in 2009 by Mark Buehrle, and at the time was the shortest amount of time between perfect games in Major League Baseball. The Rays were once again victims of a no-hitter on June 25 at Tropicana Field, thrown by former Ray, Edwin Jackson of the Arizona Diamondbacks. Jackson threw 149 pitches against his old team, and although 10 batters reached base, none were the result of a base hit.

David Price, Evan Longoria, Carl Crawford, and Rafael Soriano were named to the American League team in the 2010 All-Star game. Price was named the starting pitcher for the AL.

On July 26, 2010, Matt Garza threw a no-hitter against the Detroit Tigers, becoming the fifth pitcher to throw a no-hitter that season. It was the first no-hitter ever thrown by a Tampa Bay pitcher in the franchise's history.

On the last day of the regular season, the Rays won their second AL East championship in three years, and finished the 2010 season with the American League's best record (96–66), and behind only the Philadelphia Phillies by one game for the Majors' best record. The Rays' ace pitcher David Price finished with 19 wins, finishing second in the American League Cy Young Award voting, and closer Rafael Soriano converted 45 saves, both setting new franchise records in those respective categories.

In the postseason, the Rays were eliminated in the ALDS, losing to the Texas Rangers in five games.

=== 2011: "Game 162" and Wild Card berth ===
During the offseason, several key players from the Rays were either traded away or lost to free agency. They received five minor league prospects from the Chicago Cubs in a trade that included starting pitcher Matt Garza, while shortstop Jason Bartlett was sent to the San Diego Padres for four minor league prospects. Seven relief pitchers would not return to the team in 2011. First baseman Carlos Peña, the franchise's all-time leader in home runs, signed with the Chicago Cubs. Perhaps the biggest loss for the Rays was left fielder Carl Crawford, who signed a lucrative deal with the Boston Red Sox.

Among their acquisitions were veterans and former Red Sox teammates Johnny Damon and Manny Ramirez, who each signed one-year contracts with the Rays. Although on April 8, Ramirez chose to retire due to testing positive for a banned substance in spring training.

The Rays started the season 0–6, their worst start in franchise history, but finished the month of April with a record of 15–12, 1 1/2 games behind the New York Yankees for first place in the AL East. The Rays became the first team in league history to start the season 0–6 and finish April with a winning record.

The Rays entered the final day of the regular season tied with the Boston Red Sox for the American League wild card. The Rays won the AL wild card spot after beating the New York Yankees 8–7 in the 12th inning. The Rays battled back from a 7–0 deficit in the eighth with six runs. Down to their final strike in the ninth inning, they tied the game in the bottom of the ninth following pinch-hitter Dan Johnson's solo home run. Evan Longoria's walk-off home run won the game in the 12th inning. Longoria's home run came three minutes following the conclusion of the Baltimore Orioles rallying past the Red Sox. Boston went down in history as suffering the biggest collapse during the final month of the season in MLB history by giving up a 9-game lead in the American League Wild Card race at the beginning of September. Game 162 is commemorated in two ways in Tropicana Field. There is 162 Landing, a designation in the left field corner where Longoria's playoff-clinching home run landed. The area is located off Left Field Street where Evan Longoria's 12th-inning walk-off homer landed on September 28 to beat the Yankees and propel Tampa Bay to the postseason. The entrance to 162 Landing is open to the public and includes a recap of the events here and at Camden Yards from that night, video highlights and interviews, photos and displays. There also is a white seat in the right field corner commemorating where Dan Johnson's two-out, two-strike game-tying homer landed in the bottom of the ninth. Section 140, Seat 10, Row T.

Tampa Bay was eliminated in the ALDS by the Texas Rangers, three games to one. After the elimination, owner Stuart Sternberg expressed concern about the team's viability in Florida after the team's last playoff game failed to sell out.

=== 2012: Injuries, Emergence of Fernando Rodney and missing out on the playoffs ===
The Rays failed to make the postseason for the first time since 2009 after posting a 90–72 record. Some of the highlights of the season included closer Fernando Rodney setting a new single-season franchise record with 48 saves, and also finished with a 0.60 earned run average for the season, which is the lowest by a relief pitcher in major league history, as of today. Rodney was also named AL Comeback Player of the Year. David Price became the first pitcher in the history of the team to win 20 games, as well as the first Rays player to be given the Cy Young Award.

=== 2013: Playoff berth ===
During the offseason, the Rays traded pitchers James Shields and Wade Davis to the Kansas City Royals for top prospects Wil Myers and Jake Odorizzi, along with players Patrick Leonard, and Mike Montgomery. Elliot Johnson was later traded as a PTBNL. The Rays acquired players Yunel Escobar, Roberto Hernández (formerly known as Fausto Carmona), James Loney, Juan Carlos Oviedo, Jamey Wright, Kelly Johnson, among others. The Rays lost B.J. Upton, Carlos Peña, Jeff Keppinger, J.P. Howell, among others as well. The Rays also re-signed Fernando Rodney.

=== 2014: End of the Joe Maddon era ===
On October 24, 2014, manager Joe Maddon exercised an opt-out clause in his contract and resigned as manager of the Rays. He then was the manager of the Chicago Cubs until he was fired the last day of the 2019 season.

== 2015–present: Kevin Cash Era ==
=== 2015: Growing pains ===
The Rays named Kevin Cash as Maddon's successor on December 5, 2014; he would be the youngest manager in league. Cash's first season in 2015 saw strong performances from Chris Archer, who became a Cy Young contender, and center-fielder Kevin Kiermaier, who won his first Gold Glove Award; however the team ended the season with an 80–82 record.

=== 2016: Second-year struggles ===
The team fared more poorly in 2016; they finished last in the AL East for the first time since 2007, winning only 68 games in a season marred by injuries (including to Kiermaier) and a 3–24 stretch between June 16 and July 16.

=== 2017: Strong start, poor finish ===
The next season again saw strong performances from Archer and Alex Cobb (returning from Tommy John surgery the year before), contributing to a first half that saw the Rays in third place in the AL East at the All-Star break; however, the team finished the season by matching its 2015 record. The 2017 season also saw Erik Neander take over as general manager from Matthew Silverman, and he would continue the Rays' strategy of aggressive trade moves.

=== 2018: Back on the upswing ===
Heading into 2018, the Rays traded Evan Longoria, long considered a franchise player, to the Giants, and starter Jake Odorizzi to the Twins. More trades would come as the season went on, as Matt Andriese was dealt to Arizona, and Archer was traded to the Pittsburgh Pirates for pitcher Tyler Glasnow, outfielder Austin Meadows, and prospect Shane Baz. Despite the departure of much of their existing rotation, Glasnow and Blake Snell anchored the teams pitching staff; Snell, who lead all AL pitchers in wins (21) and ERA (1.89), won the franchise's second Cy Young Award. The team also pioneered the concept of the "opener", by which the opening pitcher is relieved after only a few outs by a more traditional starting pitcher; the strategy helped the Rays finish the year with the second-best team ERA in the American League. The Rays won 90 games, but lost the AL wild card berth to Oakland by seven games.

=== 2019: Return to the playoffs ===
Cash led the Rays to his first postseason in 2019, building off a 19–9 start to win 96 games. The pitching staff, anchored by starters Glasnow, Snell, and veteran Charlie Morton as well as relievers Nick Anderson and Diego Castillo, led the American League with a 3.65 ERA. The team defeated Oakland to claim the AL Wild Card spot, but was defeated by the Houston Astros in a five-game ALDS.

=== 2020: Shortened season and second World Series appearance ===
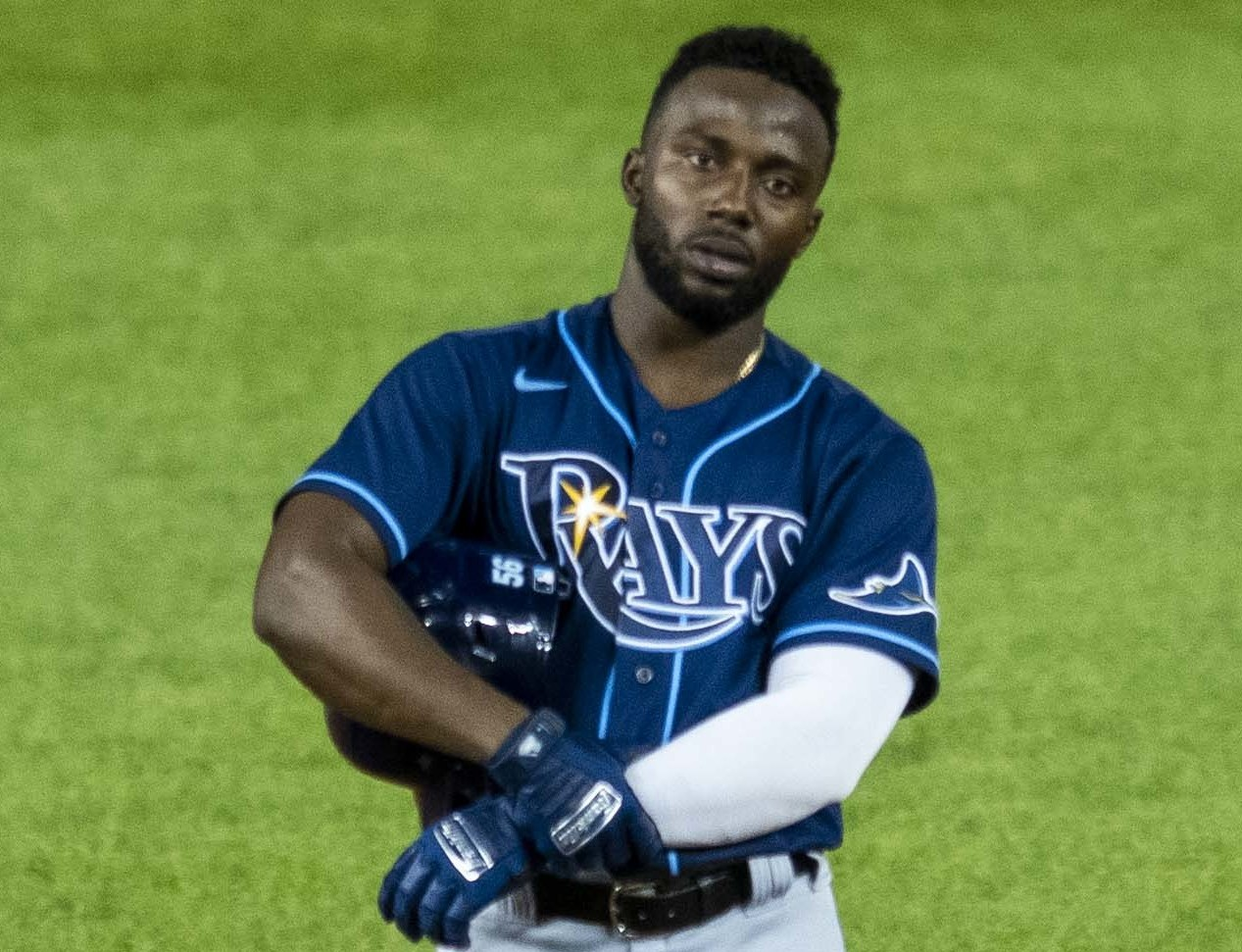
Randy Arozarena in 2020 set all-time records for most hits and home runs in a single postseason.

Despite the postseason defeat, the Rays retained much of their core going into the 2020, which had been shortened to 60 games as a result of the COVID-19 pandemic. Despite a 5–7 start, the Rays rebounded to win 35 of their last 48 games, thanks to the rotation, the bullpen (Anderson, Castillo, and Pete Fairbanks), and an offensive breakout from Brandon Lowe. At the end of the regular season, the team posted an AL-best 40–20 record, winning its first divisional title since 2011 and again advancing to the postseason.

The Rays went on to defeat the Yankees in the five-game ALDS, thanks to Mike Brosseau's go-ahead eighth inning home run off Yankees pitcher Aroldis Chapman; during the regular season, Chapman had instigated a bench-clearing altercation by throwing over Brosseau's head. The postseason was dominated by Randy Arozarena, who set new records for postseason home runs (10), hits by a rookie and by any player in a single postseason (29), and total bases (64). In a rematch of 2019, the Rays defeated the Astros in the seven-game ALCS, and went on to meet the Dodgers in the World Series. The Rays won Game 4 of the series in near-miraculous fashion; down 6–7, with two outs in the bottom of the ninth and down in the count 1–2, Brett Phillips singled off LA closer Kenley Jansen for his first career postseason hit, scoring Kiermaier to tie the game, and Arozarena to score the winning run and tie the series at two. Despite the heroics, the Rays lost the next two games to the Dodgers and were defeated in their second bid for a World Series.

=== 2021: 100 wins ===
In 2021, the Rays won 100 games for the first time in franchise history and won their second consecutive AL East title and fourth overall. However, they were defeated in the ALDS by the Boston Red Sox in four games, losing in Game 4 on a sacrifice fly by Enrique Hernández.

=== 2022 ===
In 2022, the Rays finished with an 86–76 record and placed third in the AL East. In the first year of the 12-team postseason format, the Rays were seeded sixth in the American League. They were eliminated in the Wild Card Series by the Cleveland Guardians.

=== 2023 ===
In 2023, the Rays would get off to a historic start. The Rays would begin the season with a 13–0 record and ultimately finish with a 99–63 record. As the fourth seed in the American League, they would be eliminated in the Wild Card Series by the eventual World Series champion Texas Rangers.

=== 2024 ===
The Tampa Bay Rays were expected to be World Series contenders heading into 2024, but they had a disappointing season, finishing 80-82 and missing the playoffs. But missing the playoffs was actually a blessing in disguise, as their stadium broke down. As a result, they have to play their home games at a Minor League ballpark in 2025.

=== 2025 ===
As of May 30th, the Rays have a 29-27 record and are in 2nd place in the American League East Division. On July 14, news broke that Patrick Zalupski would purchase the team for approximately $1.7 billion.
