= Delvin James =

American baseball player (born 1978)

- Starting pitcher
- Born: January 3, 1978 (age 48); Nacogdoches, Texas, U.S.
- Batted: Right Threw: Right

MLB debut
- April 16, 2002, for the Tampa Bay Devil Rays

Last MLB appearance
- September 29, 2002, for the Tampa Bay Devil Rays

MLB statistics
- Win–loss record: 0–3
- Earned run average: 6.55
- Strikeouts: 17
- Stats at Baseball Reference

Teams
- Tampa Bay Devil Rays (2002)

Delvin DeWayne James (born January 3, 1978) is an American former professional baseball pitcher in Major League Baseball who played for the Tampa Bay Devil Rays.

James attended Nacogdoches High School in Nacogdoches, Texas, where he was a five-sport star. He was the leading scorer on the school's basketball team, had a 1.43 earned run average, struck out 80 batters in 73 innings pitched and received a scholarship to play college football as a linebacker at Oklahoma State. He was a high school football teammate of Kynan Forney. He was drafted by the Devil Rays in the 14th round of the 1996 Major League Baseball draft. He was assigned to the Gulf Coast League to begin his professional career.

In September 2000, James and a minor league teammate helped apprehend a bank robber near the Tyrone Square Mall in St. Petersburg, Florida, and returned $7,600 to a SouthTrust bank.

James was called up to the Major Leagues for the first time on April 15, 2002, after pitcher Wilson Álvarez was placed on the disabled list and Travis Phelps and Jason Smith were demoted. He made his Major League debut on April 16, 2002 against the Detroit Tigers at Comerica Park. He started the game and pitched five innings, allowed two earned runs and picked up the loss. On April 27, 2002, James gave up a leadoff home run to Rickey Henderson, Henderson's 80'th leadoff home run On May 17, 2002, James was placed on the disabled list with right shoulder tendinitis.

At about 3 a.m. on September 2, 2002, James was shot three times in his non-pitching shoulder and elbow at a Waffle House in Raleigh, North Carolina. James was pitching for the nearby Durham Bulls at the time. The woman he was with was paralyzed after the shooting. Only twelve days later, James was back on Tampa Bay's Major League roster and pitching against the Toronto Blue Jays at SkyDome.

James pitched in what would be his final Major League game on September 29, 2002, against the Boston Red Sox. He pitched until 2005 in the farm systems of the Devil Rays and the Anaheim Angels.

In April 2006, James told Oklahoma State football coaches that he was planning to try to walk on to the team.

James is a cousin of basketball player Damion James.
