= Aubrey Huff =

American baseball player (born 1976)

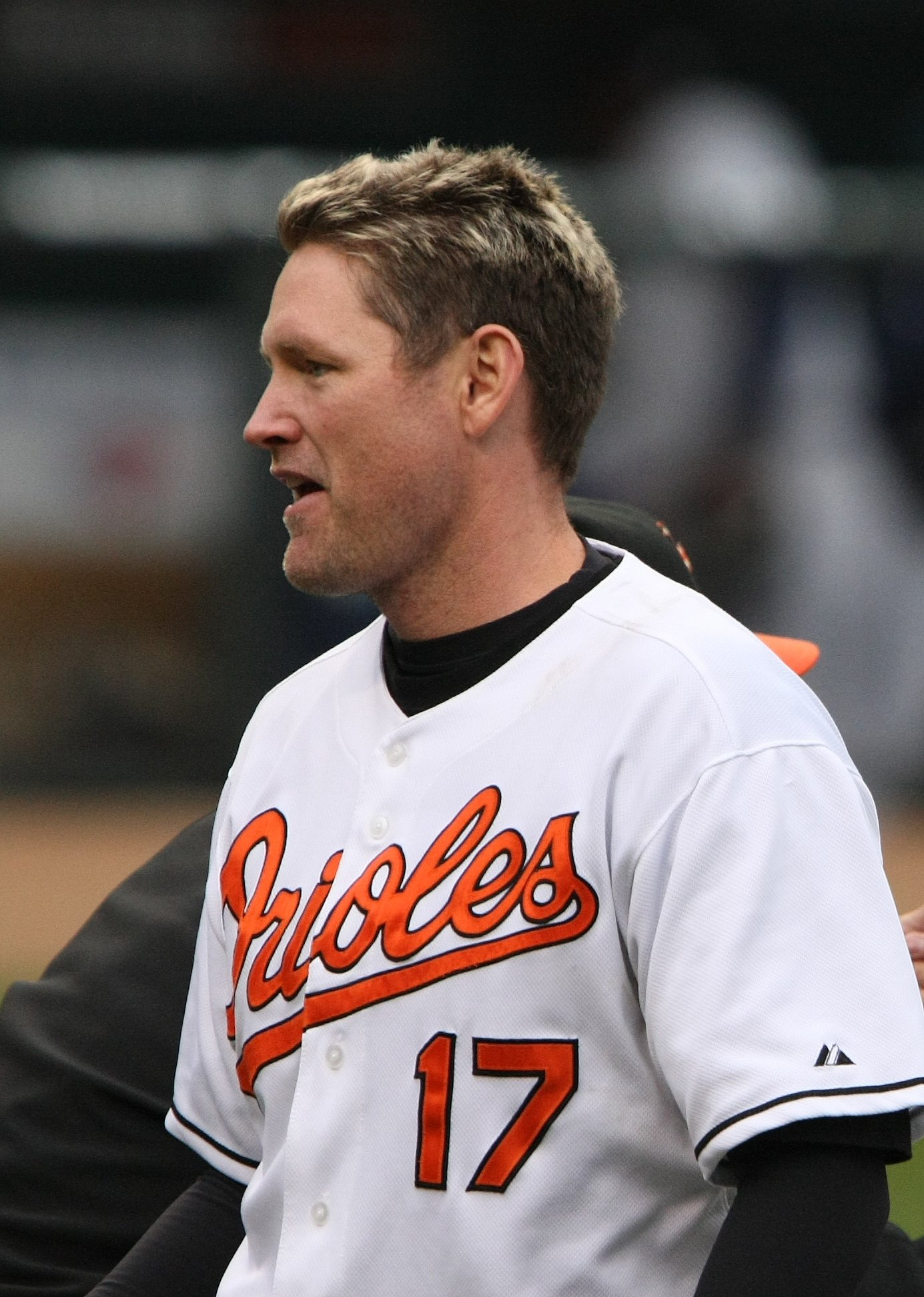
- Huff with the Baltimore Orioles in 2008
- First baseman / Designated hitter / Third baseman / Right fielder
- Born: December 20, 1976 (age 49); Marion, Ohio, U.S.
- Batted: Left Threw: Right

MLB debut
- August 2, 2000, for the Tampa Bay Devil Rays

Last MLB appearance
- October 3, 2012, for the San Francisco Giants

MLB statistics
- Batting average: .278
- Home runs: 242
- Runs batted in: 904
- Stats at Baseball Reference

Teams
- Tampa Bay Devil Rays (2000–2006); Houston Astros (2006); Baltimore Orioles (2007–2009); Detroit Tigers (2009); San Francisco Giants (2010–2012)

Career highlights and awards
- 2× World Series champion (2010, 2012); Silver Slugger Award (2008)

Aubrey Lewis Huff III (born December 20, 1976) is an American former professional baseball player who played 13 seasons in Major League Baseball (MLB). Huff played for the Tampa Bay Devil Rays, Houston Astros, Baltimore Orioles, Detroit Tigers, and San Francisco Giants; he was a member of two World Series championship teams for the Giants. He batted left-handed and threw right-handed.

Huff attended Vernon College and the University of Miami, where he finished his career second in school batting average. He was drafted by the Devil Rays in the sixth round in 1998, and debuted with them in 2000. In 2002, he finished tenth in the American League (AL) in batting average. He set a career high in 2003 with 34 home runs and batted .311 with 107 runs batted in (RBI), while tying for the lead in errors among AL right fielders with six. Next season, he batted .297 with 24 home runs and 104 RBI. In 2005, he batted .261 with 22 home runs and 92 RBI. During the 2006 season, he was traded to the Astros.

In 2007, Huff signed a three-year contract with the Orioles. He hit 15 home runs his first season with the Orioles, his lowest total since 2001. In 2008, he won the Silver Slugger Award for the designated hitter position after batting .304 with 32 home runs and a career-high 108 RBI. During the 2009 season, he was traded to the Tigers. He became a free agent after the season and signed a one-year deal with the Giants. He batted .290 with 26 home runs in 2010, reached the playoffs for the first time, and won his first World Series. He signed a two-year deal with the Giants in 2011, and batted .246 and hit 12 home runs, his lowest total since 2001. In 2012, he batted .192, was used mostly as a pinch hitter, and appeared in a career-low 52 games but won his second World Series with the Giants. The team paid a $2 million buyout to release him.

In January 2014, Huff announced his retirement from baseball, and took a position as a baseball color commentator for eight months.

== Early life ==
Huff was born in Marion, Ohio, and grew up in Mineral Wells, Texas. In 1983, when he was six years old, his father, Aubrey II, was shot and killed as an innocent bystander in a domestic dispute while working as an electrician. When his mother told him that his father had been killed, Huff later wrote: "I went back to watching The Transformers on television. I remember thinking, ‘He was never here anyway.’" Huff's mother Fonda then raised him and his sister Angela.

Growing up, Huff regularly practiced baseball in his yard, which had a batting cage with lights and a pitching machine. He said, "[My mother bought] it more to keep me out of trouble." He grew up rooting for the Texas Rangers, and frequently attended their games. One of his favorite players was Nolan Ryan. Huff initially attended Mineral Wells High School, but transferred to Brewer High School when his family moved to Fort Worth. While he was selected to the All-District baseball team in high school, he was better known as a basketball player. He graduated in 1995.

== College career ==
Huff attended Vernon College for two years and was named the Most Valuable Player (MVP) of its baseball team in 1996. He transferred to the University of Miami for his final two years of college baseball. As a junior, he tied team single-game records for runs in a game (five against Harvard University on March 28) and most doubles in a game (four on May 16 against Georgia Tech).

As a senior, Huff hit for a .412 batting average, the fourth highest single-season average in school history. (Note: All UM rankings are as of the 2012 season.) His .768 slugging percentage was the second highest in school history. He also hit 21 home runs (fifth in school history) and a school record of 95 runs batted in (RBI). Baseball America, The Sporting News, and the National Collegiate Baseball Writers Association named him a first-team All-American.

Huff finished his UM college career with a .400 batting average (second in school history) and a .719 slugging percentage (third in school history). In 2009, he was inducted into the University of Miami Sports Hall of Fame.

== Professional career ==
=== Draft and minor leagues ===
Huff was the Tampa Bay Devil Rays' fifth-round selection (162nd overall) in the 1998 Major League Baseball (MLB) draft. He spent 1998 with the Charleston RiverDogs of the single-A South Atlantic League, where he batted .321 with 85 hits, 19 doubles, 13 home runs, and 54 RBI in 69 games.

In 1999, Huff played for the Orlando Rays of the Double-A Southern League and was named a Southern League postseason All-Star. In 133 games with the Rays (tied with three players for fourth in the league behind Brady Clark's 138, Brent Abernathy's 136, and Kurt Airoso's 134), Huff batted .301 (eighth) with 148 hits (fourth, behind Abernathy's 168, Clark's 165, and Tim Giles's 157), 40 doubles (third, behind Scott Vieira's 44 and Abernathy's 42), 22 home runs (tied with John Curl for second behind Javier Cardona's 26), and 78 RBI (tied with Bry Nelson for ninth in the league).

Huff began 2000 with the Durham Bulls of the Triple-A International League. In 108 games, he batted .316 (fifth) with 129 hits, 36 doubles (fourth, behind Clark's 41, Ryan Jackson's 38, and José Fernández's 37), 20 home runs, and 76 RBI. He was named the International League Rookie of the Year and was named to the postseason All-Star team.

=== Tampa Bay Devil Rays (2000–2006) ===
==== 2000 ====
Huff was called up by the Devil Rays at the beginning of August to be the starting third baseman after Vinny Castilla suffered an injury. He had an RBI in his debut on August 2, a 5–3 loss to the Cleveland Indians. Two days later, he got his first career hit against José Mercedes in a 10–9 loss to the Baltimore Orioles. On August 10, he had a season-high three RBI by hitting his first career home run, a game-winning three-run hit against Jason Ryan in a 10–4 victory over the Minnesota Twins. In 39 games, Huff hit .287 with 35 hits, seven doubles, four home runs, and 14 RBI.

==== 2001 ====
Huff began the 2001 season with Durham, but was called up on April 13 when Ariel Prieto was sent to the minors. He became the starting third baseman on May 11 when Castilla was released. Huff was moved from third base to first base on August 6 following an injury to Steve Cox. After batting .243 with six home runs and 33 RBI in his first 92 games, he was optioned to Durham on August 23 when Cox came off the disabled list (DL). In September, he was called up to replace Greg Vaughn as the Devil Rays' designated hitter (DH). On September 19, he had three hits and five RBI, including a game-winning single against David Cone, in a 12–2 victory over the Boston Red Sox. He finished the season batting .248 with 102 hits, 25 doubles, eight home runs, and 45 RBI in 111 games. In 17 games at Durham, he batted .288 with 19 hits, six doubles, three home runs, and 10 RBI.

==== 2002 ====
Huff missed the first month of 2002 with a broken cheekbone and began the season in the minor leagues before getting called up on May 28 to replace the struggling Jason Tyner on the roster. He started for the rest of the season as a first baseman, a third baseman, or a DH. On July 19, he had four hits, including a home run against Esteban Loaiza, and three RBI in an 11–8 loss to the Blue Jays. He had a 17-game hitting streak from August 23 to September 10, the second-longest streak in franchise history at the time (behind Quinton McCracken's 18-game streak in 1998). In 113 games, Huff finished tenth in the American League (AL) with a .313 batting average and had 142 hits, 25 doubles, 23 home runs, and 59 RBI. He led the Devil Rays in home runs, marking the first time a player led his team in home runs after starting the season in the minors since 1996, when Tony Clark led the Detroit Tigers. In 32 games with Durham, he batted .325 with 41 hits, nine doubles, three home runs, and 20 RBI.

==== 2003 ====
On April 26, 2003, Huff had four hits in a 10–7 victory over the Baltimore Orioles. After playing mostly first and third base in April, he took over from George Lombard as the Devil Rays' right fielder for the remainder of the season on April 29. On May 3, he had the first multi-homer game of his career by hitting two two-run home runs against Adam Bernero in an 8–6 victory over the Tigers. He had four hits on June 4 in a 5–2 victory over the Chicago Cubs. On September 6, he stole home plate in a 7–4 victory over the Oakland Athletics. On September 23, he had four hits and hit a home run against Josh Towers in an 8–5 loss to the Blue Jays.

In 162 games (tied for second in the AL with Miguel Tejada behind Hideki Matsui's 163), he batted .311 (ninth) with 47 doubles (third behind Garret Anderson's and Vernon Wells's 49), 34 home runs (ninth), and 107 RBI (tied for eighth with Jason Giambi). Huff's single-season totals in hits, doubles, home runs, and RBI had been matched by 11 players in major league history as of 2012. He was tied for 24th in AL Most Valuable Player (MVP) voting along with Esteban Loaiza and Jason Varitek. Defensively, he tied with Tim Salmon for the lead in errors by AL right fielders with six.

==== 2004 ====
In 2004, Huff spent most of the season playing third base. On May 12, he had five RBI, including a three-run home run against Chan Ho Park, in a 9–8 loss against the Texas Rangers. He saw a streak of 398 consecutive games played snapped on August 22 when he was forced to miss a few games with a minor back injury. On August 27, he had four hits in an 8–7 loss to the Athletics. He would have four hits again on September 23 in a 7–3 loss to the Yankees.

Huff finished the season batting .297 with 178 hits, 27 doubles, 29 home runs, and 104 RBI in 157 games. His average, home runs, and RBI were the highest totals among Devil Rays' players.

==== 2005 ====
In 2005, Huff spent most of the year in right field. On April 18, Huff had four RBI and hit the 100th home run of his career, a three-run shot against Jaret Wright in a 19–8 loss to the Yankees. After hitting five home runs in the first three months, Huff hit 17 home runs through the rest of the season. On July 22, he hit the first grand slam of his career, a game-winning home run against Bruce Chen in a 7–5 victory over the Orioles. He was named the AL Player of the Week from July 25 to 31 after he batted .409 with two home runs and 10 RBI. In 148 games, Huff batted .261 with 150 hits, 26 doubles, 22 home runs, and 92 RBI.

==== 2006 ====
For 2006, Huff was moved back to third base. He was placed on the disabled list for the first time in his career on April 12 with a sprained left knee suffered in a collision with Nick Green the day before. On May 4, he was activated from the DL. On May 19, he hit his first career walk-off home run against Yusmeiro Petit in a 10-inning, 5–4 win over the Marlins. Through July 9, Huff batted .283 with 65 hits, 15 doubles, eight home runs, and 28 RBI in 63 games.

Huff ranked among the top ten in several career and single-season records in the history of the Tampa Bay Rays (Devil Rays from 1998 to 2007) as of 2019. Through 2019, he ranked fifth in games played (799), at bats (3,028), plate appearances (3,322), hits (870), doubles (172), RBI (449), and batting average (.287). His 128 home runs ranked third (behind Carlos Peña's 163, and Evan Longoria's 261), and his 400 runs scored ranked sixth. He, Longoria and Delmon Young were the only Devil Rays to appear in 162 games in a season. He held Devil Rays' record for hits in a season and doubles in a season, both set in 2003. His batting averages in 2002 and 2003 ranked sixth and seventh, respectively; his home run total in 2003 tied for fifth; and his RBI totals in 2003 and 2004 were fourth and tied for sixth, respectively.

=== Houston Astros (2006) ===
On July 12, 2006, the Houston Astros acquired Huff from Tampa Bay for minor leaguers Mitch Talbot and Ben Zobrist. Huff was used at third base for the Astros until August 1, when he was moved to right field following regular third baseman Morgan Ensberg's return from the DL. In his debut with the Astros on July 13, the first game after the All-Star break, Huff had two hits, including a three-run home run against Randy Messenger in a 5–1 victory over the Marlins. On August 9, he had three hits, two home runs, and six RBI in a 14–1 victory over the Pittsburgh Pirates. In 68 games with Houston, Huff batted .250 with 56 hits, 10 doubles, 13 home runs, and 38 RBI. He combined to bat .267 with 121 hits, 25 doubles, 21 home runs, and 66 RBI in 131 games in 2006. On October 31, he filed for free agency.

=== Baltimore Orioles (2007–2009) ===
==== 2007 ====
On January 3, 2007, Huff officially signed a three-year, $20 million contract with the Baltimore Orioles. He began the year getting most of the starts at first base, but in mid-May he became the Orioles regular DH as Kevin Millar was moved to first base. In a 9–7 loss to the Angels on June 29, he hit for the cycle and got his 1,000th hit and 200th double (both against Kelvim Escobar). He was one of four Orioles to hit for the cycle (along with Brooks Robinson, Cal Ripken Jr., and Félix Pie) and the first player to do so at Oriole Park at Camden Yards. On August 14, Huff had two hits and five RBI, including a grand slam against Jeff Karstens in a 12–0 victory over the Yankees. In 151 games, Huff batted .280 with 154 hits, 34 doubles, 15 home runs, and 72 RBI.

==== 2008 ====
Before the 2008 season, Huff switched his uniform number from 19 to 17 in honor of his former teammate Joe Kennedy, who died during the offseason. He angered fans in the offseason when he called Baltimore a "horse----" town when compared to Tampa, but he regained fan support by the end of the year by posting one of his best seasons. He was the Orioles' designated hitter for most of the season, although he was moved to third base at the end of August following an injury to Melvin Mora. On April 8, he had four hits and four RBI in an 8–1 victory over the Rangers. He was named AL Player of the Week from June 30 to July 6 after hitting .345 with three home runs and nine RBIs. He was named the Player of the Week again from August 25–31 after batting .478 with two home runs and seven RBI. In 154 games, Huff batted .304 with 182 hits (tied with Nick Markakis for 10th in the league), 48 doubles (tied with Markakis for third in the league behind Dustin Pedroia's 54 and Brian Roberts's 51), 33 home runs (tied for eighth with Jason Giambi and Josh Hamilton), and 108 RBI (sixth). He also led the American League with 82 extra-base hits. He finished 16th in AL MVP voting and was named "Most Valuable Oriole" by Baltimore sportswriters. He won the Silver Slugger Award for DH and the Edgar Martínez Award, becoming the first Oriole to win the award since Tommy Davis in 1974.

==== 2009 ====
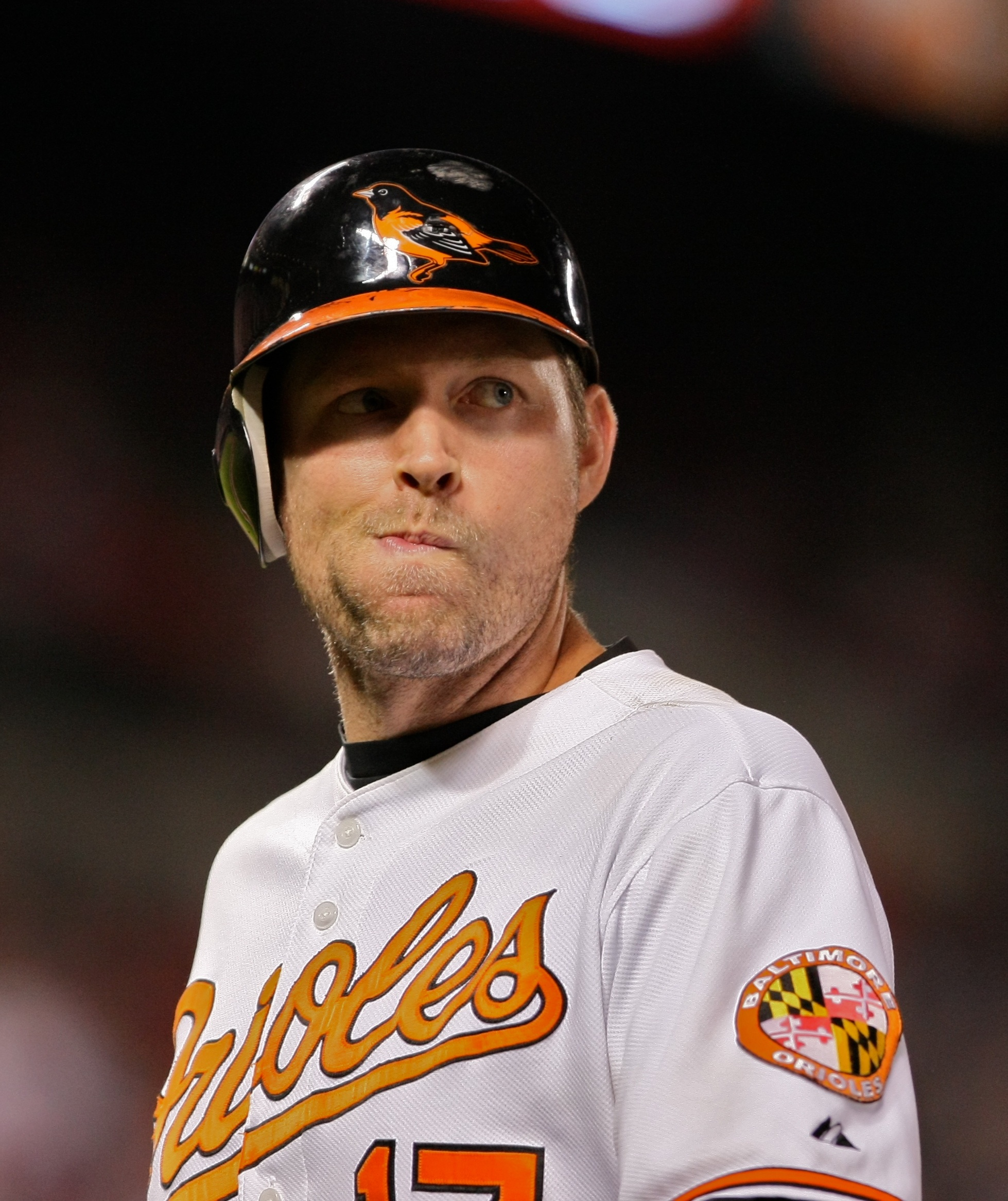
Huff with the Baltimore Orioles in 2009

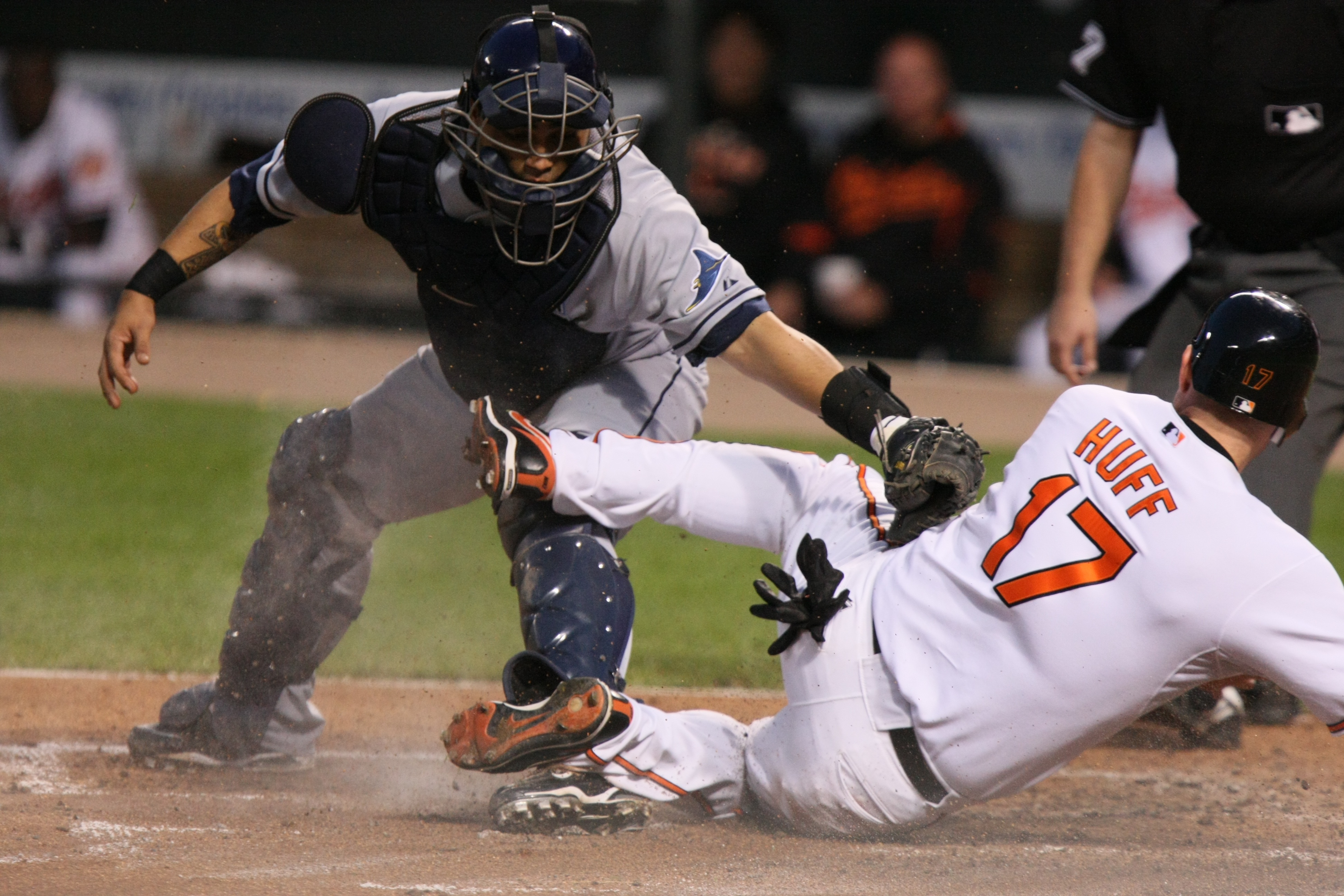
Huff scores a run for the Baltimore Orioles in 2009

Huff moved to first base in 2009 following the departure of Millar. Through August 17, Huff batted .253 with 109 hits, 24 doubles, 13 home runs, and 72 RBI in 110 games.

=== Detroit Tigers (2009) ===
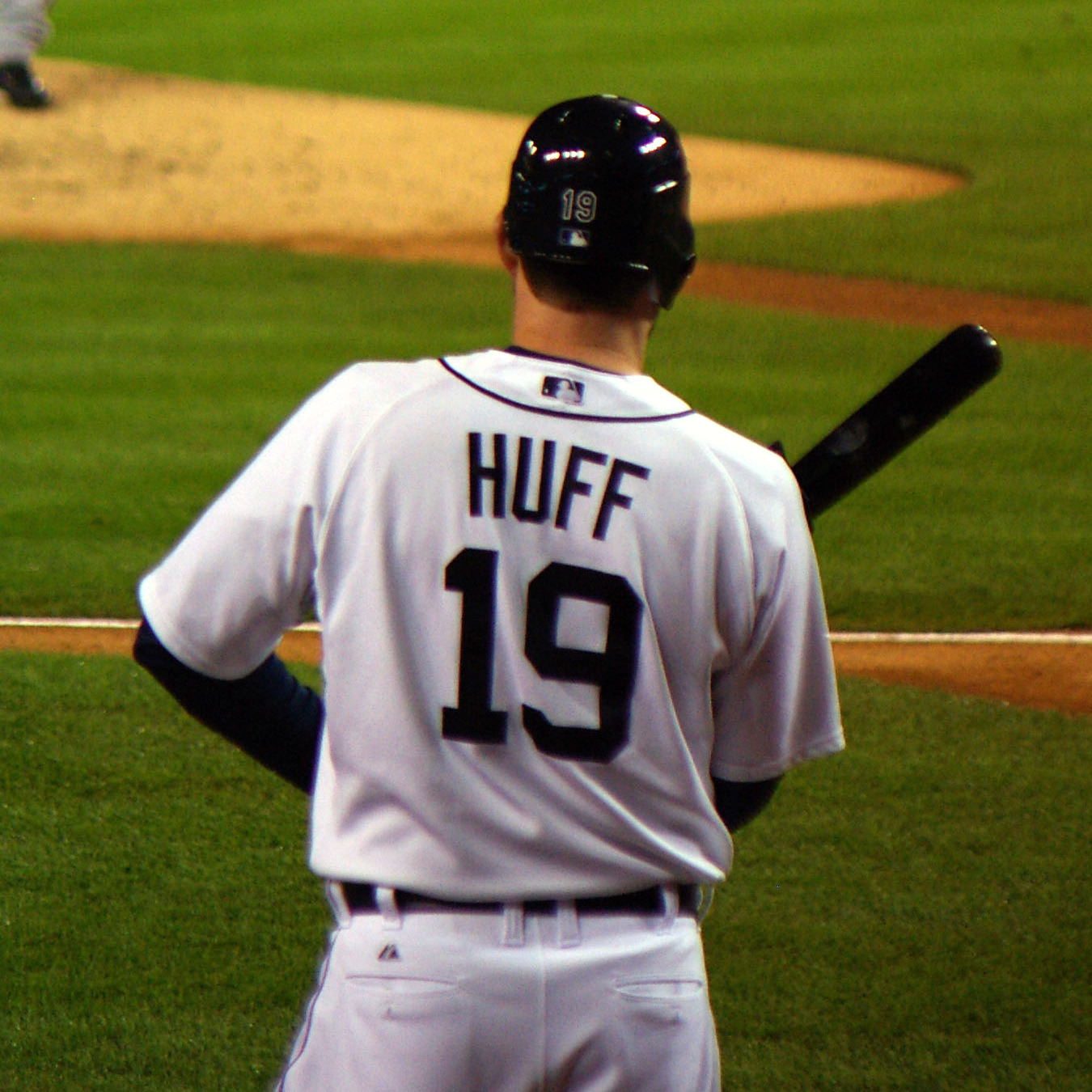
Huff with the Detroit Tigers in 2009

On August 17, 2009, Huff cleared waivers and was traded to the Detroit Tigers in exchange for pitching prospect Brett Jacobson. He began his time with the Tigers as the team's DH, but in September he only played against right-handed pitchers as Marcus Thames began playing against left-handed pitchers. He hit his first career pinch-hit home run against Jason Frasor on September 14, a game-tying three-run hit in a 10-inning, 6–5 victory over Toronto.

In 40 games with the Tigers, Huff batted .189/.265/.302 with 20 hits, six doubles, two home runs, and 13 RBI. His season totals were a .241 batting average, 129 hits, 30 doubles, 15 home runs, and 85 RBI in 150 games. Following the season, Huff filed for free agency.

=== San Francisco Giants (2010–2012) ===
==== 2010 ====
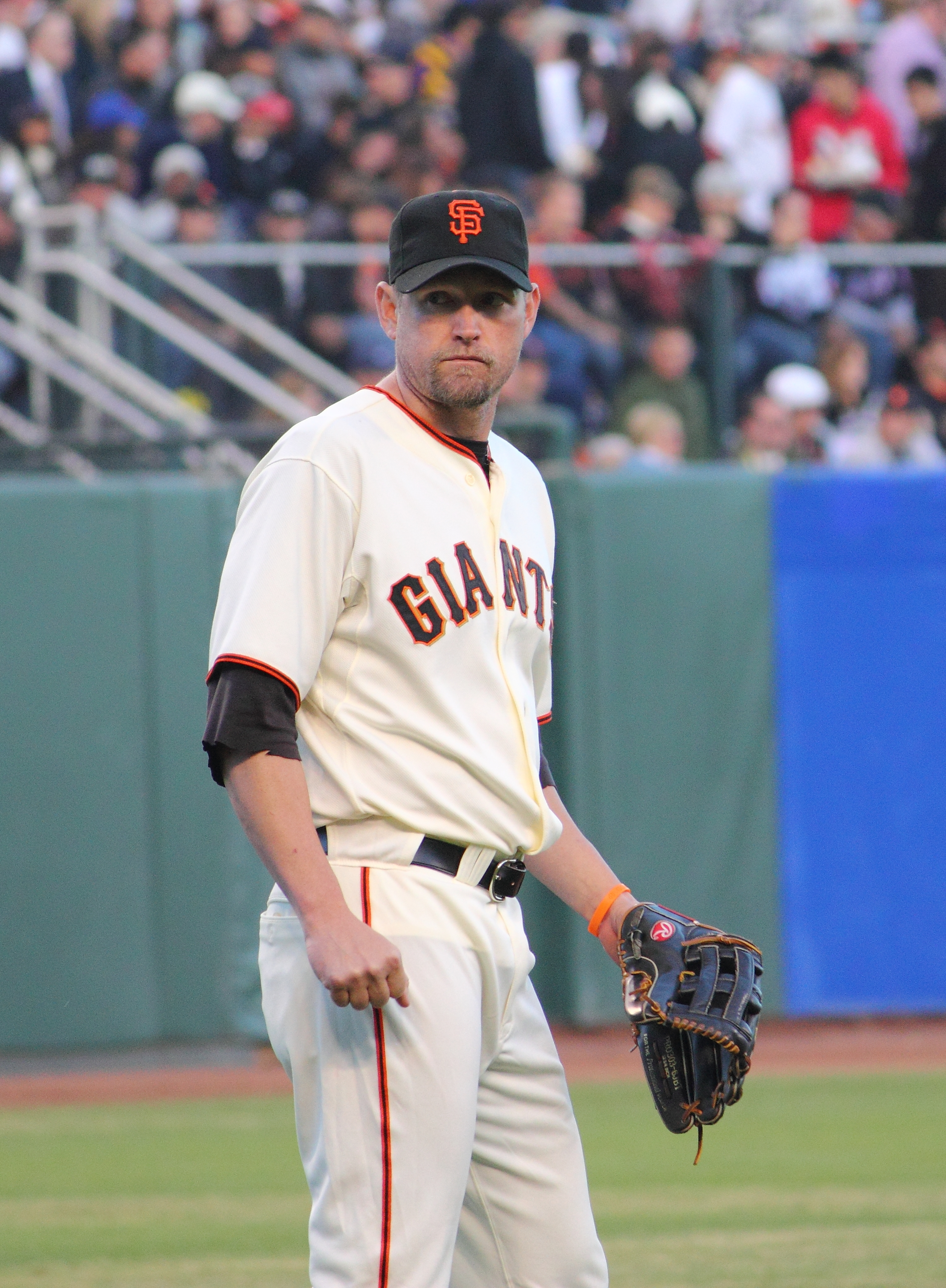
Huff playing with the San Francisco Giants in 2010

On January 13, 2010, Huff signed a one-year, $3 million contract with the San Francisco Giants. He spent most of the season playing first base for the Giants, although he played left field and right field when Buster Posey played first base from May 29 – June 30 and Travis Ishikawa made most of the starts at first base from July 3 – August 14. On April 14, Huff hit his first career inside-the-park home run (his first home run with the Giants) against Charlie Morton in a 6–0 victory over the Pirates. On August 28, he got his 1,500th career hit against Alex Sanabia in a 10-inning, 10–9 victory over the Marlins. In 157 games, Huff batted .290 with 165 hits, 35 doubles, 26 home runs, and 86 RBI while scoring 100 runs (tied for seventh in the league with Brandon Phillips, Martín Prado, and Dan Uggla) for the first time in his career. Huff finished seventh in the voting for the NL MVP award.

Huff, in the 11th year of his career, reached the playoffs for the first time as the Giants won the NL West. In Game 3 of the NL Division Series (NLDS) against the Atlanta Braves, he had a ninth-inning, two-out, game-tying RBI single against Mike Dunn in a 3–2 Giants' victory. He batted .267 with four hits and one RBI in the series as the Giants defeated the Braves in four games. He batted .250 with six hits and three RBI in the series as the Giants defeated the Phillies in six games. In Game 4 of the World Series against the Texas Rangers on October 31, he hit a two-run home run against Tommy Hunter in a 4–0 Giants' victory. He batted .294 with five hits, a home run, and four RBI in the series, winning his first World Series as the Giants defeated the Rangers in five games to win their first World Series in 56 years.

==== 2011 ====
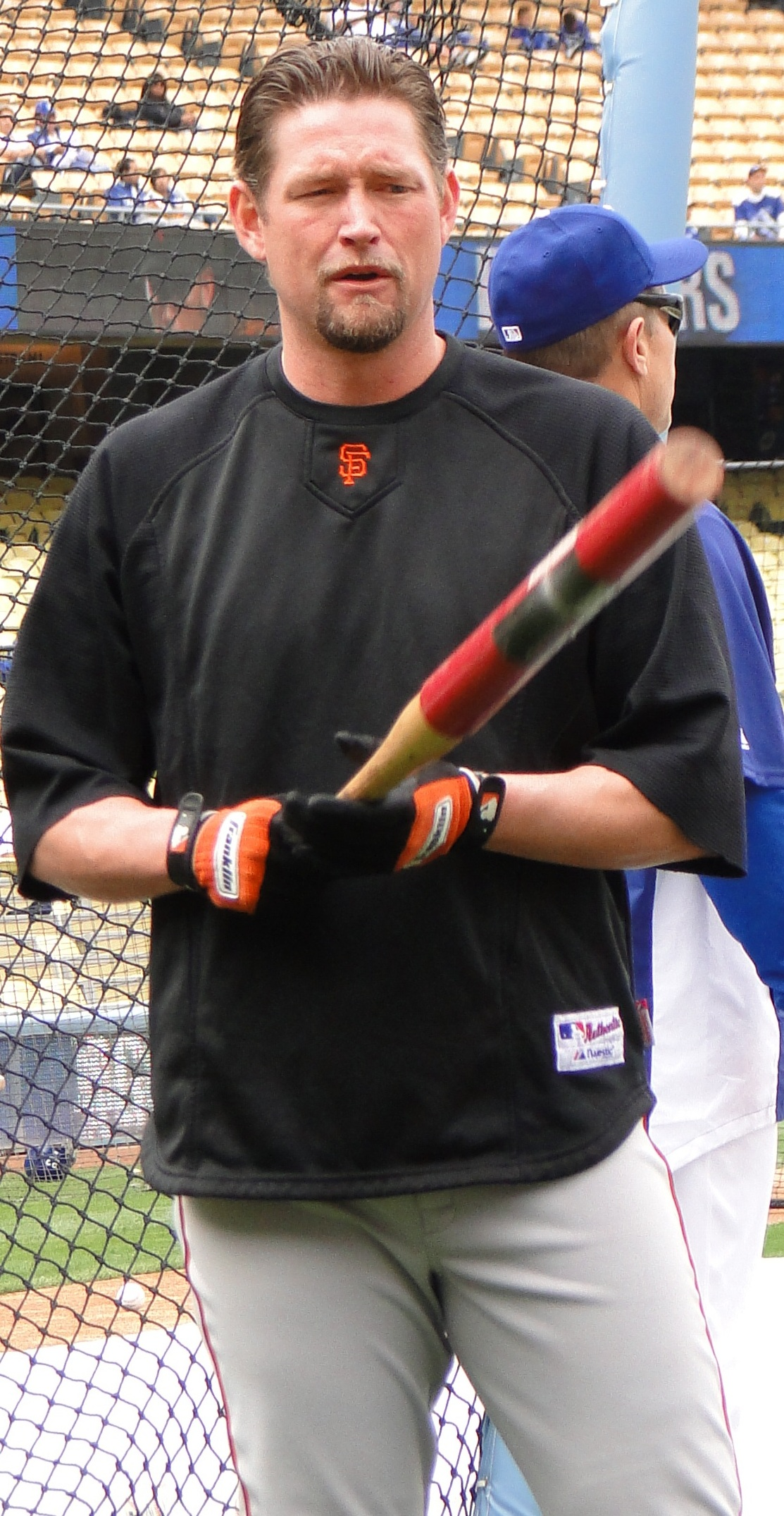
Huff with the San Francisco Giants in 2011

Huff filed for free agency after the 2010 season, but on November 23, 2010, he re-signed with the Giants on a two-year, $22 million contract with a club option for 2013. Coming off the team's 2010 World Series success and his new contract, Huff arrived at 2011 spring training out of shape. He began 2011 in right field due to an injury to Cody Ross, but he returned to first base when Ross was activated from the disabled list on April 20. He drew a pinch-hit, game-winning, bases loaded walk on April 30 against John Lannan in a 2–1 victory over the Washington Nationals. On June 2, his wife's birthday, Huff hit three home runs and drove in a career-high six runs in the Giants' 12–7 win over the St. Louis Cardinals. He said after the game, "[My wife] wanted me to hit her a homer. I hit three. Brownie points." Those home runs accounted for a quarter of his season total, as his overall production dropped from the previous season.

For the season, he batted .246/.306/.370. Compared to 2010, his batting average dropped 44 points, his homers fell from 26 to 12, and his walks went from 83 to 47 as he grew impatient. His On-base plus slugging (OPS) dropped 215 points to .676, last among Major League first baseman in 2011. Giants' manager Bruce Bochy said, "[Huff's] struggles helped cause our struggles"; the Giants failed to return to the playoffs in 2011.

==== 2012 ====
In 2012 spring training, Huff competed with Brandon Belt and Brett Pill for the Giants' first base job. Belt won the job, and Huff opened the season as the Giants' left fielder. On April 21, because the Giants did not have any infielders available, Huff was positioned at second base for the first time in his career in the ninth inning of a tied game against the Mets. He failed to cover second base in a potential double play situation, and the Mets went on to win the first game of the doubleheader 5–4. After the game, on April 25, Huff was placed on the 15-day disabled list with anxiety issues.

He returned from the disabled list on May 7, but was used mainly as a pinch hitter for the rest of the season. On June 15, he was placed on the DL with a sprained right knee that he suffered jumping over a dugout railing to celebrate Matt Cain's perfect game. He returned from the DL on July 28 but was placed on it four days later with right knee tendinitis, which kept him out until August 31.

In 52 games, Huff batted .192/.326/.282 with 15 hits, four doubles, one home run, and seven RBI. In the playoffs, Huff was used exclusively as a pinch hitter. In 10 games, he had one hit in nine at-bats but won his second career World Series as the Giants swept the Tigers in four games. On November 1, Huff's $10 million club option was declined, making him a free agent. He instead was paid a $2 million buyout.

Huff hit 242 career home runs, which as of May 16, 2022, ties him for 257th all-time with a number of players. In addition to being used as a designated hitter, he played at five different positions in his career: first base, third base, left field, right field, and second base.

== Post-playing career ==
On January 4, 2014, Huff announced his retirement from baseball and took a position as a baseball color commentator for the Pac-12 Network. On March 31, 2014, Huff started co-hosting a morning radio show on Bay Area sports radio station 95.7 The Game with Chris Townsend and Ric Bucher titled Bucher, Towny and Huff. Huff left the show in August 2014.

Huff was an assistant baseball coach at Canyon Crest Academy in San Diego, California in 2015. In late 2015, Huff announced he was attempting a comeback three years after playing his final Major League game. In February 2017, he released a book, co-written by Stephen Cassar, entitled Baseball Junkie, in which he opens up about his "battle with anxiety and the pressure of playing in the Major Leagues".

== Personal life ==
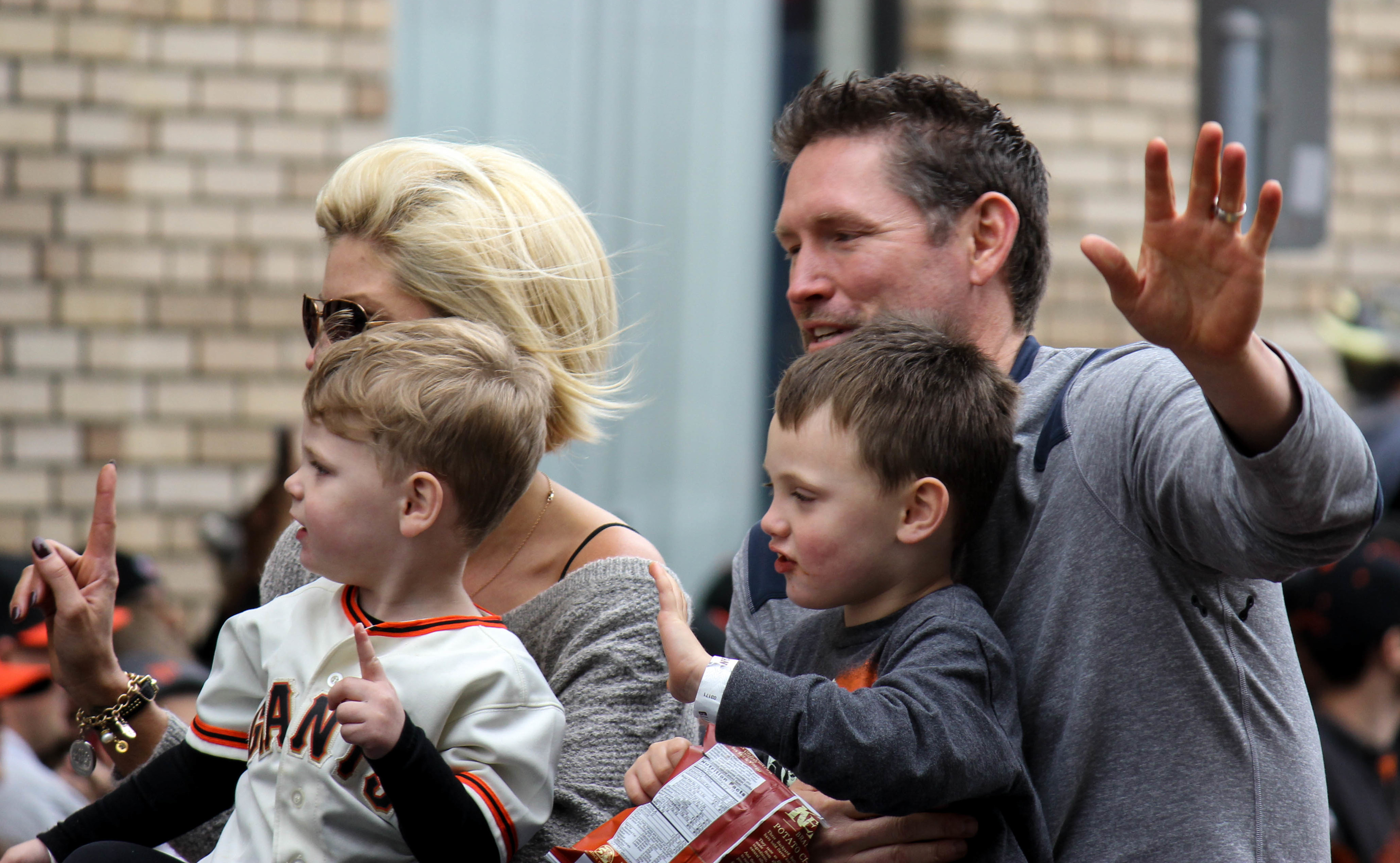
Huff with his family at the 2012 World Series victory parade

On January 27, 2007, Huff married Barbara "Baubi" Heaton. The couple have two sons. During Huff's playing days, they resided in Tampa, Florida, in the off-season. Baubi Huff filed for divorce on January 31, 2012. Although the couple briefly reconciled, they eventually divorced and Huff claimed that a woman could only marry him for money.

Huff has several tattoos. A Transformers fan, he has the logos of the Autobots and Decepticons tattooed on his shoulder blades. On his left shoulder, he also has a tattoo of a guitar with his father's name under it in memory of his father.

Huff said he began taking Adderall in 2009, and was high on it "every game, pretty much" thereafter. He said: "I was crushing 20, sometimes 50, 60, almost 100 milligrams daily". He said he was “high as a kite” during the team's 2010 victory parade, as he struggled with the drug, which he views as a performance-enhancing drug. He said he then developed a dependency on alcohol to help him sleep, drinking 12–15 beers after games.

During the Giants' 2010 playoff race and postseason, Huff became known for wearing a red "rally thong", which he joked would help the team win. When he was slumping in 2011, fans sent him thongs throughout the season in hopes of improving his performance.

In 2014, Huff says he contemplated suicide as he held a .357 Magnum to his head, with its hammer cocked, "ready to pull the trigger".

=== Politics ===
Huff has supported the policies of current President Donald Trump, and has made statements that some people considered to be sexist, transphobic, and violent in nature. In November 2019, a comment Huff posted on Twitter went viral. He stated: "Getting my boys trained up on how to use a gun in the unlikely event @BernieSanders beats @realDonaldTrump in 2020. In which case knowing how to effectively use a gun under socialism will be a must." The tweet was accompanied by a photo of a smiling Huff wearing a pro-Trump T-shirt at a shooting range, holding a used target with many bullet holes in it, and accompanied by two children (presumed to be his sons) whose faces were out of the frame of the picture.

In early January 2020, Huff was criticized after tweeting in response to a comment on the site which talked about invading Iran and kidnapping women from the country. He wrote: "Let's get a flight over and kidnap about 10 each. We can bring them back here as they fan us and feed us grapes, amongst other things." Huff later claimed the tweets were satirical, and continued to post similar tweets.

In mid-January 2020, when the Giants promoted Alyssa Nakken to be an assistant coach, making her the first full-time female assistant coach in the history of MLB, Huff tweeted: "I got in trouble for wearing a thong in my own clubhouse when female reporters were present. Can't imagine how it will play out with a full time female coach running around. This has #metoo & #BelieveAllWomen written all over it. Only in @SFGiants." And then: "Couldn't imagine taking baseball instruction from an ex female softball player. Have fun with that @bcraw35 @bbelt9 @BusterPosey."

His behavior eventually prompted the Giants to ban Huff from a 2020 ceremony honoring their 2010 World Series championship. The team wrote that its reason was: "Aubrey has made multiple comments on social media that are unacceptable and run counter to the values of our organization." Huff claimed that he was banned because of his support for President Trump saying "If you look at my Twitter account, I'd say about 75 percent of my support [is for] President Trump. So, yeah, absolutely. I have every reason to believe in my heart of hearts it was all about President Trump."

In June 2020, Huff criticized people who wear masks to avoid spreading the COVID-19 virus, saying "If you want to wear a mask and live in fear for the rest of your lives, that's certainly your prerogative. But the vast majority of well-adjusted, sane, common sense people that aren't sheep and can reason for themselves agree with me. I understand that coronavirus is real. If you have pre-existing conditions, or you're an old person or—and this is going to sound insensitive, but someone has to say it—you're morbidly obese, then stay the fuck home. Just because that is your plight in life, doesn't mean the whole world has to shut down. If I God forbid get the coronavirus, here's what I do: I go home, I get well and I get back and live my life. I would rather die from coronavirus than live the rest of my life in fear and wear a mask."

Huff has stated that he is not anti-vaccination, rather "anti you telling me I need to get vaxxed." However, his other social media posts and his Twitter bio state that he is an anti-vaxxer.

On August 9, 2021, his Twitter account was permanently suspended, or banned, for what was called "spreading COVID misinformation." On December 16, 2022, Huff's Twitter account was reinstated.

In 2022, Huff ran for the school board in the Solana Beach school district and lost to his opponent, incumbent candidate Debra Schade, garnering just 17.5% of the vote to Schade's 82.5%.

=== Allegations of homophobia ===
In June 2026, Huff made posts on the social media platform X regarding the San Francisco Giants annual "Pride Night", in which several Giants players caused controversy by either refusing to wear hats featuring the LGBTQ rainbow flag or writing Bible verses on their caps. Huff's posts, which were widely described as homophobic, attracted heated responses online, with some users supporting Huff for speaking out while others sharply condemned him and accused him of regurgitating previous hateful sentiments. In his posts, Huff called the Giants organization "pathetic" and blamed the Giants players for "[not] having the stones to wear bible verses on their hats", describing the team's clubhouse as being "overrun by a bunch of spoiled[,] talentless pussies who posses [sic] zero pride, nor respect for the game, the organization, the fans, & even teammates", while also saying he "respect[s] the hell out of" Buster Posey, the manager of the Giants and Huff's former teammate. In another post, Huff defended Posey's refusal to answer any questions regarding the controversy, stating "I can pretty much guarantee you I know exactly what Buster wants to say". Huff used anti-LGBTQ language to describe what he thought Posey was thinking, saying "I'm not wearing this gay bullshit. Queers don’t watch Baseball anyway. They watch The View, enjoy therapy, & [sic] fudge packing sessions. And anyone inside the LGBTQ community, or those who support them don’t like what I just said, then I say to you…. Go fuck yourselves, & eat a dick. And I mean that in the most literal sense."

Huff has previously been known for making homophobic and divisive comments. In 2020, Huff was excluded from celebrations tied to the Giants' 2010 World Series-winning team after making a series of controversial posts on social media. Huff's Twitter account was banned by the site in 2021, but was reinstated in December 2022.

== See also ==
- List of Major League Baseball career home run leaders
- List of Major League Baseball players to hit for the cycle

== Notes ==
Awards and achievements
Preceded by Mark Ellis	Hitting for the cycle June 29, 2007	Succeeded by Carlos Gómez
Preceded by Nick Markakis	Most Valuable Oriole; 2008	Succeeded by Nick Markakis
