= Félix Escalona =

Venezuelan baseball player (born 1979)

Navegantes del Magallanes
- Coach
- Born: March 12, 1979 (age 46); Puerto Cabello, Carabobo State, Venezuela
- Batted: Right Threw: Right

MLB debut
- April 4, 2002, for the Tampa Bay Devil Rays

Last MLB appearance
- October 2, 2005, for the New York Yankees

MLB statistics
- Batting average: .209
- Hits: 43
- Runs batted in: 13
- Stats at Baseball Reference

Teams
- Tampa Bay Devil Rays (2002–2003); New York Yankees (2004–2005)

Félix Eduardo Escalona (born 12 March 1979) is a Venezuelan baseball coach and former Major League Baseball shortstop and second baseman. He is the first base coach for the Navegantes del Magallanes of the Venezuelan Professional Baseball League.

== Career ==
He was signed by the Houston Astros as an amateur free agent in 1995 and drafted by the San Francisco Giants from Houston in the 2001 Rule 5 Draft. Later, he was selected off waivers by the Tampa Bay Devil Rays in 2002, making his major league debut in that season. In 2003, Escalona was claimed off waivers by the Baltimore Orioles, but did not play in the majors for them.

In 2004, Escalona signed a minor league contract with the New York Yankees and was invited to spring training. He started the season with the Triple-A Columbus Clippers and was recalled to the majors in September. Escalona was released by the Yankees during the 2006 season.

In 2008, Escalona signed with the Ottawa Rapidz of the Can-Am League, but was released on July 6, 2008.

In February 2009, Escalona signed with the De Angelis Godo of Italy's Serie A1.

In a four-season major league career, Escalona was a .209 hitter with 13 RBI and 20 runs in 84 games.

== See also ==
- List of Major League Baseball players from Venezuela
- Rule 5 draft results
