= Steve Kent (baseball) =

American baseball player (born 1978)

- Pitcher
- Born: October 3, 1978 (age 47); Frankfurt, West Germany
- Batted: Switch Threw: Left

MLB debut
- April 4, 2002, for the Tampa Bay Devil Rays

Last MLB appearance
- September 22, 2002, for the Tampa Bay Devil Rays

MLB statistics
- Win–loss record: 0–2
- Earned run average: 5.65
- Strikeouts: 41

CPBL statistics
- Win–loss record: 0–1
- Earned run average: 5.06
- Strikeouts: 12
- Stats at Baseball Reference

Teams
- Tampa Bay Devil Rays (2002); Brother Elephants (2008)

Steven Patrick Kent (born October 3, 1978) is an American former professional baseball pitcher. He played in Major League Baseball (MLB) for the Tampa Bay Devil Rays.

Kent was born in Frankfurt to a United States military family and spent much of his young life moving around, a lifestyle he said prepared him for the itinerant life of a professional baseball player. He played college baseball for the Florida International Panthers and then Odessa Wranglers. Before his first semester at Florida International, he was involved in fatal car accident which resulted in him receiving 55 stitches and cosmetic surgery and missing several months of practice before the start of the season. However, when he returned to play, he found his fastball velocity had increased dramatically.

Kent played for the Tampa Bay Devil Rays during the 2002 season. In 34 games in relief in his one-season career, Kent had a 0–2 record with a 5.65 earned run average. He allowed 67 hits and 41 runs (36 earned) in 57.1 innings. From 2003–2007 Kent spent time with the Florida Marlins, Colorado Rockies, Atlanta Braves and Houston Astros. The highlight of Kent's brief MLB career came on May 19, 2002. Kent pitched 4 scoreless innings to pick up his only MLB save during a Rays victory over the Baltimore Orioles.

In 2008, Kent pitched for three different teams in the Atlantic League of Professional Baseball.
