= Jason Jiménez =

American baseball player (born 1976)

- Pitcher
- Born: January 10, 1976 (age 50); Modesto, California, U.S.
- Batted: Right Threw: Left

MLB debut
- June 3, 2002, for the Tampa Bay Devil Rays

Last MLB appearance
- September 28, 2002, for the Detroit Tigers

MLB statistics
- Win–loss record: 0–0
- Earned run average: 7.36
- Strikeouts: 5
- Stats at Baseball Reference

Teams
- Tampa Bay Devil Rays (2002); Detroit Tigers (2002)

Jason Jon Jiménez (born January 10, 1976, in Modesto, California) is an American former professional baseball pitcher. He played in Major League Baseball (MLB) for the Tampa Bay Devil Rays and Detroit Tigers during the 2002 season and enjoyed an eight-year career in the minor leagues. Jiménez won championships in both Triple-A baseball and the Puerto Rican Professional Baseball Winter League. Following his baseball career, he became a police officer in Elk Grove, California, and a long-time high school pitching coach.

== Early life and amateur career ==
Jiménez, who is of Mexican descent, attended Elk Grove High School in Elk Grove, California, and played college baseball at San Jose State University. He was selected by the Tampa Bay Devil Rays in the 28th round of the 1997 MLB draft. Baseball-Reference.com

== Professional career ==
=== Minor League Baseball ===
From 1997 to 2004, Jiménez pitched in the minor leagues, compiling a 27–22 win–loss record, 28 saves, and a 3.33 ERA in 323 appearances across multiple levels and teams, including the Hudson Valley Renegades, St. Petersburg Devil Rays, Orlando Rays, Durham Bulls, Toledo Mud Hens, Reading Phillies, and Scranton/Wilkes-Barre Red Barons.

=== Major League Baseball ===
Jiménez made his MLB debut on June 3, 2002, with the Tampa Bay Devil Rays, later joining the Detroit Tigers the same season. He appeared in six games, posting a 7.36 ERA, 5 strikeouts, and a WHIP of 1.91 over 7.1 innings. He accrued approximately 123 days of official MLB service time during the 2002 season.

=== Championships and winter ball ===
In the 1998–99 winter season, Jiménez pitched for the Caguas Criollos of the Puerto Rican Professional Baseball League, helping the team to win the league championship and advance to the Caribbean Series in Culiacán, Mexico.

Later, in 2001, while with the Triple-A Durham Bulls, he was part of the team that captured the International League Championship (Governors' Cup).

== Post-playing career ==
After undergoing Tommy John surgery and retiring from professional baseball, Jiménez joined the Elk Grove Police Department, where he has served for over 17 years. He also became the pitching coach at Elk Grove High School, mentoring numerous players for more than a decade.

== Career statistics ==
=== MLB ===
Year	Team	GP	IP	ERA	SO	BB	WHIP
2002	TB / DET	6	7.1	7.36	5	2	1.91

=== Minor leagues (1997–2004) ===
- 323 games, 27–22 record, 28 saves, 3.33 ERA.
