= Brent Abernathy =

American baseball player (born 1977)

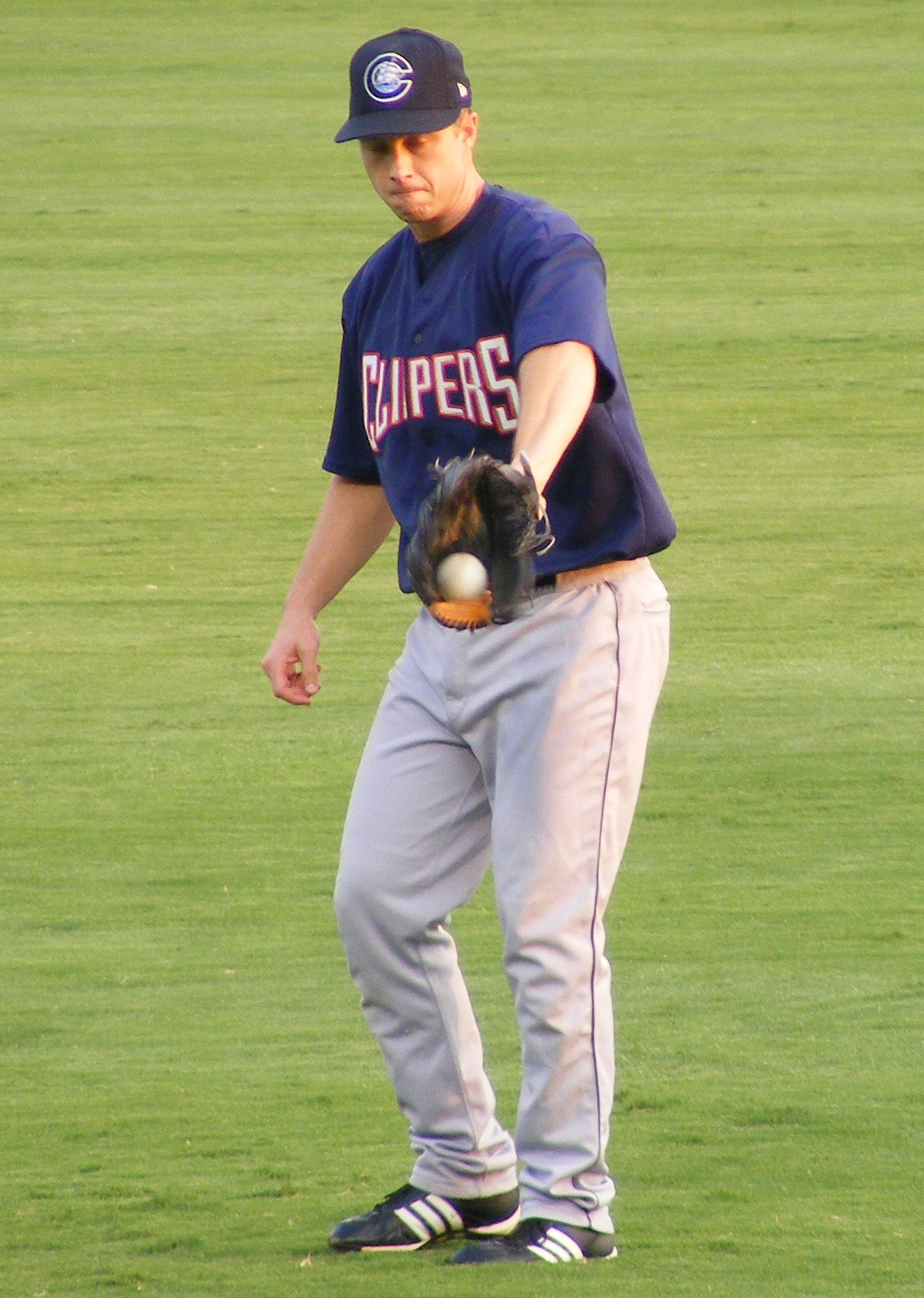
- Second baseman
- Born: September 23, 1977 (age 48); Atlanta, Georgia, U.S.
- Batted: Right Threw: Right

MLB debut
- June 25, 2001, for the Tampa Bay Devil Rays

Last MLB appearance
- September 29, 2005, for the Minnesota Twins

MLB statistics
- Batting average: .244
- Home runs: 8
- Runs batted in: 79
- Stats at Baseball Reference

Teams
- Tampa Bay Devil Rays (2001–2003); Kansas City Royals (2003); Minnesota Twins (2005)
Medals
Men's baseball
Representing United States
Olympic Games
Gold medal – first place	2000 Sydney	Team
World Junior Baseball Championship
Gold medal – first place	1995 Massachusetts	Team

Michael Brent Abernathy (born September 23, 1977) is an American former professional baseball infielder. He played in Major League Baseball (MLB) from 2001 to 2003 for the Tampa Bay Devil Rays and Kansas City Royals, and again in 2005 for the Minnesota Twins.

== Career ==
He attended high school at The Lovett School, where he played on the school's baseball team. He was awarded the Dial Award for the national high-school scholar-athlete of the year in 1995. Abernathy was named to the All-America First Team by the American Baseball Coaches Association and Rawlings.

Abernathy was drafted by the Toronto Blue Jays in the second round of the 1996 Major League Baseball draft. In 2000, he was traded to the Tampa Bay Devil Rays for pitchers Steve Trachsel and Mark Guthrie. He played for the gold medal-winning United States team in the 2000 Olympics, and went on to make his debut in the majors with Tampa Bay and later played with the Kansas City Royals and the Minnesota Twins. He has not been in the majors since 2005.

Abernathy was one of two Tampa Bay Devil Rays players to reach base against the Boston Red Sox on April 27, 2002, on a walk, but then was thrown out at second after Russ Johnson hit into a fielder's choice. Abernathy's plate appearance broke up Derek Lowe's bid for a perfect game. Lowe did finish the game, however, with a no-hitter.

On April 7, 2008, Abernathy signed with the Long Island Ducks of the Atlantic League. His last season in professional baseball was 2009, when he played with the Camden Riversharks.
