= Luis de los Santos (pitcher) =

Dominican baseball player (born 1977)

- Pitcher
- Born: November 1, 1977 (age 48); Santo Domingo, Dominican Republic
- Batted: Right Threw: Right

MLB debut
- July 20, 2002, for the Tampa Bay Devil Rays

Last MLB appearance
- July 31, 2002, for the Tampa Bay Devil Rays

MLB statistics
- Win–loss record: 0–3
- Earned run average: 11.57
- Strikeouts: 7
- Stats at Baseball Reference

Teams
- Tampa Bay Devil Rays (2002)

Luis de los Santos (November 1, 1977) is a Dominican former professional baseball player who pitched in Major League Baseball in 2002 for the Tampa Bay Devil Rays.
