= Steve Cox (baseball) =

American baseball player

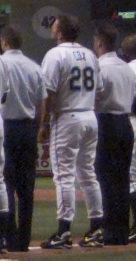
- Cox on Opening Day in 2002
- First baseman
- Born: October 31, 1974 (age 51); Delano, California, U.S.
- Batted: Left Threw: Left

Professional debut
- MLB: September 19, 1999, for the Tampa Bay Devil Rays
- NPB: March 14, 2003, for the Yokohama BayStars

Last appearance
- MLB: September 25, 2002, for the Tampa Bay Devil Rays
- NPB: June 5, 2003, for the Yokohama BayStars

MLB statistics
- Batting average: .262
- Home runs: 39
- Runs batted in: 158

NPB statistics
- Batting average: .200
- Home runs: 1
- Runs batted in: 7
- Stats at Baseball Reference

Teams
- Tampa Bay Devil Rays (1999–2002); Yokohama BayStars (2003)

Charles Steven Cox (born October 31, 1974) is an American former professional baseball first baseman. He played in Major League Baseball (MLB) for the Tampa Bay Devil Rays and in Nippon Professional Baseball (NPB) for the Yokohama BayStars.

== Career ==
Cox attended Monache High School in Porterville, California, graduating in 1992. was chosen in the fifth round of the 1992 Major League Baseball draft by the Oakland Athletics. He played in their organization for six seasons without appearing in the major leagues. He was selected by the Devil Rays with the 46th pick in the 1997 MLB Expansion Draft.

Cox broke out in 1999, when he posted an impressive .341/.414/.588 batting line with 25 home runs and 107 runs scored for the Durham Bulls, earning International League MVP honors.

Cox was first called up to MLB on September 17, 1999, along with Jim Morris. He made his Major League debut on September 19, 1999 as a pinch hitter in the seventh inning against the Texas Rangers, in which he also earned his first major league hit, a double off of Jeff Fassero. For the 1999 season, Cox appeared in 6 games, batting .211 in 19 at-bats. His story inspired the Brooks character in the Jim Morris biopic, The Rookie.

Cox began the 2000 season on the major league roster, and spent the entire season with the Rays. In 116 games, Cox hit .283/.379/.453 with 11 home runs and 35 RBIs. Cox received a single vote in AL Rookie of the Year voting, tying him for sixth place with Adam Kennedy, Mark Redman and Barry Zito.

Cox spent the next two years as a near everyday player for the Rays, playing in 256 out of a possible 324 games. In 2001, he hit .257/.323/.427 with 12 home runs and 51 RBIs in 108 games. In 2002, he was a regular starter at first base and as a designated hitter appearing in 148 games, hitting .254/.330/.396 with 30 doubles, 16 home runs and 72 RBIs.

Cox played himself in the background of The Rookie, the 2002 film about his Devil Rays teammate, Jim Morris.

During the 2002 offseason, Cox who was coming off a career-best season, surprisingly, decided to leave the Rays and the MLB behind to play for the Yokohama BayStars of the NPB. In his lone season in Japan, he only appeared in 15 games, batting .200/.298/.280 with 1 home run and 7 RBIs.

He returned briefly to the Devil Rays organization, playing 19 games for the Durham Bulls during the 2005 season, where he hit .210/.329/.436 with 3 home runs and 9 RBIs before retiring.

In 2007, Cox became the head coach for Porterville College, and coached the Pirates for two seasons.

== Personal life ==
Cox's wife, Sara, is the daughter of Buzz Stephen, who pitched for the Minnesota Twins.
