= 2006 Washington Nationals season =

2006 Washington Nationals
- League: National League
- Division: East
- Ballpark: Robert F. Kennedy Memorial Stadium
- City: Washington, D.C.
- Record: 71–91 (.438)
- Divisional place: 5th
- Owners: Lerner Enterprises
- General managers: Jim Bowden
- Managers: Frank Robinson
- Television: MASN; WDCA (My 20) (Bob Carpenter, Tom Paciorek)
- Radio: WTWP/WWWT (Charlie Slowes, Dave Jageler)

The 2006 Washington Nationals season was the franchise's second season in Washington, D.C., and 38th season overall.

The Nationals finished last in the National League East for the third consecutive year (counting their final season in Montreal), 26 games behind the New York Mets with a 71–91 record.

== Offseason ==
- On November 4, 2005, the Nationals traded Vinny Castilla to the San Diego Padres for Brian Lawrence.
- On December 8, 2005, they traded Brad Wilkerson, Terrmel Sledge, and minor leaguer Armando Galarraga to the Texas Rangers for Alfonso Soriano.
- On December 24, 2005, they signed Mike Stanton – who they had traded to the Boston Red Sox late in the previous season – as a free agent.
- On February 11, 2006, the Nationals sold Jamey Carroll to the Colorado Rockies for $300,000,
- On March 31, 2006, they sold Jim Crowell to the Philadelphia Phillies.

== Advertising and marketing ==
The Nationals' marketing slogan for the season was "Make It Your Pastime." The slogan was a reference to the common saying that baseball is "the national pastime" in the United States.

== Spring training ==
The Nationals held their 2006 spring training in Viera, Florida, with home games played at Space Coast Stadium.

== Regular season ==
=== Groundbreaking for Nationals Park ===
On May 4, 2006, the groundbreaking ceremony took place for the Nationals' new ballpark, Nationals Park in Southeast Washington, D.C. Principal Owner Mark D. Lerner, Managing Principal Owner Theodore N. Lerner, Principal Owner Robert K. Tanenbaum, and Principal Owner Edward L. Cohen wielded the shovels at the ceremony; public address announcer Charlie Brotman emceed the event, and Mayor of the District of Columbia Anthony A. Williams, Nationals Manager Frank Robinson, representatives from Major League Baseball, the District of Columbia Sports and Entertainment Commission, the Anacostia Waterfront Corporation, and Clark-Hunt-Smoot Construction, and former Washington Senators and Homestead Grays players also attended. Less than two years later, the Nationals moved to Nationals Park for the 2008 season.

=== Beltway Series ===
During spring training in 2006, the Nationals and Orioles played each other in Washington on March 31 and in Baltimore on April 1. The first match-up of the regular-season Beltway Series rivalry took place on May 19, 2006, at Robert F. Kennedy Memorial Stadium; the Orioles won. This marked first time in 35 years that the Orioles played a regular-season game in Washington; previously, they had played the original Washington Senators of the American League annually from 1954 to 1960 and the expansion Washington Senators – which replaced the original Senators – each year from 1961 to 1971.

The two teams split the 2006 season series 3–3 with each team winning two games at home and one on the road.

=== Alfonso Soriano joins the 40–40 club ===
On September 16, Soriano stole second base in the first inning to become the fourth player to join the 40–40 club, after Jose Canseco, Barry Bonds, and Alex Rodriguez.

=== Season standings ===
==== National League East ====
NL East
Team	W	L	Pct.	GB	Home	Road
New York Mets	97	65	.599	—	50‍–‍31	47‍–‍34
Philadelphia Phillies	85	77	.525	12	41‍–‍40	44‍–‍37
Atlanta Braves	79	83	.488	18	40‍–‍41	39‍–‍42
Florida Marlins	78	84	.481	19	42‍–‍39	36‍–‍45
Washington Nationals	71	91	.438	26	41‍–‍40	30‍–‍51

==== Record vs. opponents ====
2006 National League record Source: MLB Standings Grid – 2006
Team	AZ	ATL	CHC	CIN	COL	FLA	HOU	LAD	MIL	NYM	PHI	PIT	SD	SF	STL	WAS	AL
Arizona	—	6–1	4–2	4–2	12–7	2–4	4–5	8–10	3–3	1–6	1–5	5–1	9–10	8–11	4–3	1–5	4–11
Atlanta	1–6	—	6–1	4–3	3–3	11–8	3–4	3–3	2–4	7–11	7–11	3–3	7–2	3–4	4–2	10–8	5–10
Chicago	2–4	1–6	—	10–9	2–4	2–4	7–8	4–2	8–8	3–3	2–5	6–9	0–7	2–4	11–8	2–4	4–11
Cincinnati	2–4	3–4	9–10	—	5–1	4–2	10–5	0–6	9–10	3–4	2–4	9–7	2–4	2–5	9–6	5–1	6-9
Colorado	7–12	3–3	4–2	1–5	—	3–3	4–2	4–15	2–4	1–5	3–4	3–3	10–9	10–8	2–7	8–0	11–4
Florida	4–2	8–11	4–2	2–4	3–3	—	3–4	1–5	7–0	8–11	6–13	5–2	3–3	3–3	1–5	11–7	9–9
Houston	5–4	4–3	8–7	5–10	2–4	4-3	—	3–3	10–5	2–4	2–4	13–3	3–3	1–5	9–7	4–4	7–11
Los Angeles	10–8	3–3	2–4	6–0	15–4	5–1	3–3	—	4–2	3–4	4–3	6–4	5–13	13–6	0–7	4–2	5–10
Milwaukee	3–3	4–2	8–8	10–9	4–2	0–7	5–10	2–4	—	3–3	5–1	7–9	4–3	6–3	7–9	1–5	6–9
New York	6–1	11–7	3–3	4–3	5–1	11–8	4–2	4–3	3–3	—	11–8	5–4	5–2	3–3	4–2	12–6	6–9
Philadelphia	5-1	11–7	5–2	4–2	4–3	13–6	4–2	3–4	1–5	8–11	—	3–3	2–4	5–1	3–3	9–10	5–13
Pittsburgh	1–5	3–3	9–6	7–9	3–3	2–5	3–13	4–6	9–7	4–5	3–3	—	1–5	6–1	6–9	3–3	3–12
San Diego	10–9	2–7	7–0	4–2	9–10	3–3	3–3	13–5	3–4	2–5	4–2	5–1	—	7–12	4–2	5–1	7–8
San Francisco	11–8	4–3	4–2	5–2	8–10	3–3	5–1	6–13	3–6	3–3	1–5	1–6	12–7	—	1–4	1–5	8–7
St. Louis	3–4	2–4	8–11	6–9	7–2	5-1	7–9	7–0	9–7	2–4	3–3	9–6	2–4	4–1	—	4–3	5–10
Washington	5–1	8–10	4–2	1–5	0–8	7-11	4–4	2–4	5–1	6–12	10–9	3–3	1–5	5–1	3–4	—	7–11

Nationals vs. American League
Team	AL East				
Team	BAL	BOS	NYY	TB	TOR
Washington	3–3	0–3	2–1	2–1	0–3

=== Opening Day lineup ===
Opening Day Starters
Name	Position
Brandon Watson	Center fielder
José Vidro	Second baseman
José Guillén	Right fielder
Nick Johnson	First baseman
Alfonso Soriano	Left fielder
Ryan Zimmerman	Third baseman
Royce Clayton	Shortstop
Brian Schneider	Catcher
Liván Hernández	Starting pitcher

=== Notable transactions ===
- July 13, 2006: The Nationals traded Gary Majewski, Royce Clayton, Bill Bray, Brendan Harris, and minor-leaguer Daryl Thompson to the Cincinnati Reds for Felipe López. Austin Kearns, and Ryan Wagner.
- July 28, 2006: The Nationals traded Mike Stanton to the San Francisco Giants for minor-leaguer Shairon Martis.
- August 7, 2006: The Nationals traded Liván Hernández and cash to the Arizona Diamondbacks for Matt Chico and Garrett Mock.
- August 31, 2006: The Nationals traded Daryle Ward to the Atlanta Braves for minor-leaguer Luis Atilano and Marlon Anderson to the Los Angeles Dodgers for minor-leaguer Jhonny Núñez.
- September 1, 2006: The Nationals received Nook Logan from the Detroit Tigers as part of a conditional deal.

=== Draft ===
The 2006 Major League Baseball draft took place on June 6 and 7. With their first pick – the 15th pick overall – the Nationals selected outfielder Chris Marrero. Other notable players the Nationals selected were pitcher Cole Kimball (12th round, 361st overall), pitcher Sam Dyson (19th round, 571st overall), outfielder Khris Davis (29th round, 871st overall), first baseman Tyler Moore (33rd round, 991st overall), and pitcher Brad Peacock (41st round, 1,231st overall). The Nationals had drafted Moore in 2005, but he had not signed, and he did not sign again this year. Dyson and Davis also did not sign with the Nationals.

=== Roster ===
2006 Washington Nationals
Roster
Pitchers: 36 Tony Armas Jr.; 34 Pedro Astacio; 57 Jason Bergmann; 30 Chris Booker; 59 Micah Bowie; 43 Bill Bray; 39 Brett Campbell; 43 Roy Corcoran; 32 Chad Cordero; 27 Zach Day; 45 Ryan Drese; 58 Joey Eischen; 61 Liván Hernández; 41 Shawn Hill; 37 Travis Hughes; 38 Gary Majewski; 48 Mike O'Connor; 26 Ramón Ortiz; 22 John Patterson; 54 Beltrán Pérez; 55 Santiago Ramírez; 51 Jon Rauch; 52 Saúl Rivera; 47 Félix Rodríguez; 55 Chris Schroder; 30 Mike Stanton; 40 Billy Traber; 35 Ryan Wagner	Catchers: 13 Robert Fick; 7 Wiki González; 10 Brandon Harper; 18 Matthew LeCroy; 23 Brian Schneider; Infielders: 8 Marlon Anderson; 9 Bernie Castro; 10 Royce Clayton; 18 Melvin Dorta; 4 Brendan Harris; 24 Nick Johnson; 7,2 Felipe López; 4 Henry Mateo; 3 José Vidro; 11 Ryan Zimmerman	Outfielders: 26 Marlon Byrd; 19 Ryan Church; 44 Alex Escobar; 6 José Guillén; 2 Damian Jackson; 28 Austin Kearns; 7 Nook Logan; 17 George Lombard; 21 Luis Matos; 12 Alfonso Soriano; 16 Mike Vento; 31 Daryle Ward; 00 Brandon Watson	Manager: 20 Frank Robinson; Coaches: 29 Tony Beasley (Third Base); 53 Randy Knorr (Bullpen) (June 15-); 5 Davey Lopes (First Base); 49 Mitchell Page (Hitting); 14 Eddie Rodríguez (Bench); 46 Randy St. Claire (Pitching); 35 John Wetteland (Bullpen) (-June 14)

=== Attendance ===
The Nationals drew 2,153,056 fans at Robert F. Kennedy Memorial Stadium in 2006, placing them 11th in attendance for the season among the 16 National League teams.

=== Game log ===
2006 game log
April (8-17)

#	Date	Opponent	Score	Win	Loss	Save	Attendance	Record
1	April 3	@ New York Mets	2-3	Glavine (1-0)	Hernández (0-1)	Wagner (1)	54,371	0-1
2	April 5	@ New York Mets	9-5 (10)	Cordero (1-0)	Julio (0-1)		19,557	1-1
3	April 6	@ New York Mets	5-10	Martínez (1-0)	Ortiz (0-1)		25,839	1-2
4	April 7	@ Houston Astros	1-6	Backe (1-0)	Armas (0-1)		26,978	1-3
5	April 8	@ Houston Astros	12-8	Hernández (1-1)	Qualls (0-1)		39,324	2-3
6	April 9	@ Houston Astros	3-7	Pettitte (1-1)	Drese (0-1)		31,662	2-4
7	April 10	@ Houston Astros	4-5 (12)	Qualls (1-1)	Stanton (0-1)		27,944	2-5
8	April 11	New York Mets	1-7	Bannister (1-0)	Ortiz (0-2)		40,516	2-6
9	April 12	New York Mets	1-3	Martínez (2-0)	Armas (0-2)	Wagner (2)	29,986	2-7
10	April 13	New York Mets	13-4	Zambrano (1-0)	Hernández (1-2)		25,460	2-8
11	April 14	@ Florida Marlins	3-5	Willis (1-0)	Drese (0-2)	Borowski (1)	12,913	2-9
12	April 15	@ Florida Marlins	2-1	Patterson (1-0)	Olsen (0-1)	Cordero (1)	15,668	3-9
13	April 16	@ Florida Marlins	7-5	Majewski (1-0)	Herges (0-1)	Cordero (2)	10,296	4-9
14	April 18	@ Philadelphia Phillies	10-3	Armas (1-2)	Lidle (1-2)		20,072	5-9
15	April 19	@ Philadelphia Phillies	6-7 (10)	Franklin (1-1)	Stanton (0-2)		27,913	5-10
16	April 20	@ Philadelphia Phillies	10-4	Traber (1-0)	Madson (1-1)		28,177	6-10
17	April 21	Atlanta Braves	7-3	Stanton (1-2)	Cormier (0-1)		24,597	7-10
	April 22	Atlanta Braves	Postponed (rain) Rescheduled for September 18					
18	April 23	Atlanta Braves	1-3	Cormier (1-1)	Majewski (1-1)	Remlinger (1)	21,569	7-11
19	April 24	Cincinnati Reds	2-4	Ramírez (1-0)	Hernández (1-3)	Weathers (5)	19,263	7-12
20	April 25	Cincinnati Reds	5-6	Williams (1-2)	Traber (1-1)	Weathers (6)	21,642	7-13
21	April 26	Cincinnati Reds	0-5	Arroyo (4-0)	Ortiz (0-3)		19,380	7-14
22	April 27	@ St. Louis Cardinals	2-6	Ponson (3-0)	O'Connor (0-1)		39,515	7-15
23	April 28	@ St. Louis Cardinals	8-3	Armas (2-2)	Marquis (3-2)		40,841	8-15
24	April 29	@ St. Louis Cardinals	1-2	Looper (2-0)	Rauch (0-1)	Isringhausen (7)	39,596	8-16
25	April 30	@ St. Louis Cardinals	2-9	Suppan (2-2)	Day (1-3)		39,383	8-17

May (14-15)

#	Date	Opponent	Score	Win	Loss	Save	Attendance	Record
26	May 1	@ New York Mets	1-2	Wagner (2-0)	Majewski (1-2)		28,310	8-18
27	May 2	@ New York Mets	6-2	O'Connor (1-1)	Maine (0-1)		34,046	9-18
28	May 3	Florida Marlins	5-6	Nolasco (2-1)	Stanton (1-3)	Borowski (4)	21,918	9-19
29	May 4	Florida Marlins	3-11	Johnson (2-2)	Hernández (1-4)		20,984	9-20
30	May 5	Pittsburgh Pirates	6-0	Day (2-3)	Pérez (1-5)		21,059	10-20
31	May 6	Pittsburgh Pirates	4-5 (11)	Gonzalez (1-2)	Rodriguez (0-1)		29,953	10-21
32	May 7	Pittsburgh Pirates	5-4	O'Connor (2-1)	Duke (2-3)	Cordero (3)	30,659	11-21
33	May 9	@ Cincinnati Reds	7-1	Armas (3-2)	Claussen (2-4)		16,716	12-21
34	May 10	@ Cincinnati Reds	6-9	Weathers (1-1)	Stanton (1-4)		14,180	12-22
35	May 11	@ Cincinnati Reds	4-5 (11)	Shackelford (1-0)	Eischen (0-1)		16,716	12-23
36	May 12	@ Atlanta Braves	2-6	Smoltz (3-2)	Ortiz (0-4)		31,818	12-24
37	May 13	@ Atlanta Braves	5-8	Reitsma (1-1)	Cordero (1-1)		37,040	12-25
38	May 14	@ Atlanta Braves	8-1	Armas (4-2)	Thomson (1-3)		31,062	13-25
39	May 16	@ Chicago Cubs	0-4	Zambrano (2-2)	Hernández (1-5)		39,298	13-26
40	May 17	@ Chicago Cubs	0-5	Marshall (3-1)	Day (2-4)		39,757	13-27
41	May 18	@ Chicago Cubs	5-3	Ortiz (1-4)	Wood (0-1)	Cordero (4)	40,517	14-27
42	May 19	Baltimore Orioles	1-5	Benson (6-3)	O'Connor (2-2)		30,320	14-28
43	May 20	Baltimore Orioles	8-3	Rauch (1-1)	Lopez (1-7)		32,502	15-28
44	May 21	Baltimore Orioles	3-1	Hernández (5-2)	Chen (0-5)	Cordero (5)	32,152	16-28
45	May 22	Houston Astros	3-10	Rodríguez (6-2)	Day (2-5)		18,803	16-29
46	May 23	Houston Astros	4-1	Ortiz (2-4)	Nieve (1-3)	Cordero (6)	23,189	17-29
47	May 24	Houston Astros	5-1	Majewski (2-2)	Wheeler (0-3)		24,194	18-29
48	May 25	Houston Astros	8-5	Armas (5-2)	Pettitte (3-6)	Cordero (7)	24,733	19-29
49	May 26	Los Angeles Dodgers	10-4	Hernández (3-5)	Tomko (5-2)		22,712	20-29
50	May 27	Los Angeles Dodgers	1-3	Lowe (3-3)	Stanton (1-5)	Saito (2)	26,867	20-30
51	May 28	Los Angeles Dodgers	10-4	Ortiz (3-4)	Seo (2-3)		30,348	21-30
52	May 29	@ Philadelphia Phillies	2-11	Condrey (1-0)	O'Connor (2-3)		33,682	21-31
53	May 30	@ Philadelphia Phillies	2-4	Myers (4-2)	Armas (5-3)	Gordon (15)	23,805	21-32
54	May 31	@ Philadelphia Phillies	3-2	Hernández (4-5)	Lidle (4-5)	Cordero (8)	30,386	22-32

June (11-16)

#	Date	Opponent	Score	Win	Loss	Save	Attendance	Record
55	June 2	@ Milwaukee Brewers	10-4	Ortiz (4-4)	Eveland (0-3)		21,476	23-32
56	June 3	@ Milwaukee Brewers	4-3	Bray (1-0)	Turnbow (2-3)	Cordero (9)	40,392	24-32
57	June 4	@ Milwaukee Brewers	8-4	Armas (6-3)	de la Rosa (2-2)		21,608	25-32
58	June 5	@ Atlanta Braves	5-4	Hernández (5-5)	Hudson (5-4)	Cordero (10)	20,702	26-32
59	June 6	@ Atlanta Braves	3-5	Ramírez (2-1)	Hill (0-1)	Ray (3)	23,497	26-33
60	June 7	@ Atlanta Braves	5-2	Ortiz (5-4)	Smoltz (4-4)	Cordero (11)	32,001	27-33
61	June 8	Philadelphia Phillies	5-2	O'Connor (3-3)	Brito (0-2)	Cordero (12)	24,669	28-33
62	June 9	Philadelphia Phillies	9-8 (12)	Cordero (2-1)	Condrey (1-1)		24,751	29-33
63	June 10	Philadelphia Phillies	2-6	Geary (4-0)	Hernández (5-6)		32,089	29-34
64	June 11	Philadelphia Phillies	6-0	Hill (1-1)	Hamels (1-1)		30,583	30-34
65	June 12	Colorado Rockies	3-4	Francis (5-5)	Ramón Ortiz (5-5)	Fuentes (14)	20,633	30-35
66	June 13	Colorado Rockies	2-9	Fogg (4-4)	O'Connor (3-4)		21,689	30-36
67	June 14	Colorado Rockies	8-14	Martin (1-0)	Bray (1-1)		24,273	30-37
68	June 15	Colorado Rockies	1-8	Jennings (5-6)	Hernández (5-7)		22,793	30-38
69	June 16	New York Yankees	5-7	Rivera (4-3)	Cordero (2-2)		44,749	30-39
70	June 17	New York Yankees	11-9	Rauch (2-1)	Rivera (4-4)	Cordero (13)	45,085	31-39
71	June 18	New York Yankees	3-2	Majewski (3-2)	Wang (7-3)		45,157	32-39
72	June 19	@ Boston Red Sox	3-6	Snyder (1-0)	Armas (6-4)	Timlin (1)	36,252	32-40
73	June 20	@ Boston Red Sox	3-11	Wakefield (5-8)	Hernández (5-8)		36,421	32-41
74	June 21	@ Boston Red Sox	3-9	Lester (2-0)	Hill (1-2)		36,464	32-42
75	June 23	@ Baltimore Orioles	1-2	Lopez (5-8)	Patterson (1-1)	Ray (19)	48,331	32-43
76	June 24	@ Baltimore Orioles	2-3	Williams (2-3)	Cordero (2-3)		36,290	32-44
77	June 25	@ Baltimore Orioles	9-5	Hernández (6-8)	Cabrera (4-5)		27,680	33-44
78	June 27	@ Toronto Blue Jays	0-6	Burnett (1-1)	Ortiz (5-6)		20,228	33-45
79	June 28	@ Toronto Blue Jays	1-6	Lilly (8-7)	Hill (1-3)		17,067	33-46
80	June 29	@ Toronto Blue Jays	4-8	Halladay (10-2)	Patterson (1-2)		17,175	33-47
81	June 30	Tampa Bay Devil Rays	1-11	Corcoran (2-0)	O'Connor (3-5)		21,854	33-48

July (14-11)

#	Date	Opponent	Score	Win	Loss	Save	Attendance	Record
82	July 1	Tampa Bay Devil Rays	4-3 (10)	Cordero (3-3)	Meadows (2-2)		21,515	34-48
83	July 2	Tampa Bay Devil Rays	6-2	Ortiz (6-6)	Seo (2-5)		23,823	35-48
84	July 3	Florida Marlins	9-1	Astacio (1-0)	Nolasco (6-5)		24,943	36-48
85	July 4	Florida Marlins	6-4	Cordero (4-3)	Borowski (0-2)		23,118	37-48
86	July 5	Florida Marlins	9-18	Petit (1-1)	O'Connor (3-6)	Pinot (1)	18,441	37-49
87	July 6	Florida Marlins	8-7 (11)	Cordero (5-3)	Vargas (1-2)		29,053	38-49
88	July 7	San Diego Padres	2-3	Williams (4-1)	Ortiz (6-7)	Hoffman (23)	25,161	38-50
89	July 8	San Diego Padres	2-5	Young (8-4)	Astacio (1-1)	Hoffman (24)	27,060	38-51
90	July 9	San Diego Padres	9-10	Cassidy (5-4)	Cordero (5-4)	Linebrink (1)	22,000	38-52
All–Star Break (July 10–12)
91	July 14	@ Pittsburgh Pirates	4-7	Duke (6-8)	Ortiz (6-8)	Gonzalez (14)	26,720	38-53
92	July 15	@ Pittsburgh Pirates	6-7	Gonzalez (3-3)	Corcoran (0-1)		32,626	38-54
93	July 16	@ Pittsburgh Pirates	8-4 (11)	Stanton (2-5)	Hernández (0-3)		18,908	39-54
94	July 17	@ Florida Marlins	2-4	Nolasco (7-6)	Armas (6-5)	Borowski (18)	7,562	39-55
95	July 18	@ Florida Marlins	7-6	Stanton (3-5)	Kensing (1-3)	Cordero (14)	11,247	40-55
96	July 19	@ Florida Marlins	0-1	Sánchez (3-0)	Ortiz (6-9)	Borowski (19)	25,546	40-56
97	July 21	Chicago Cubs	7-6	Rauch (3-1)	Howry (3-3)	Cordero (15)	35,442	41-56
98	July 22	Chicago Cubs	7-3	Hernández (7-8)	Williamson (2-3)		38,021	42-56
99	July 23	Chicago Cubs	7-1	Armas (7-5)	Mármol (3-4)		30,851	43-56
100	July 25	San Francisco Giants	8-6	Ortiz (7-9)	Morris (8-8)	Cordero (16)	33,358	44-56
101	July 26	San Francisco Giants	4-3	Rivera (1-0)	Benítez (4-2)		30,248	45-56
102	July 27	San Francisco Giants	6-5	Hernández (8-8)	Cain (7-7)	Cordero (17)	29,717	46-56
103	July 28	@ Los Angeles Dodgers	1-13	Billingsley (2-3)	Armas (7-6)		55,825	46-57
104	July 29	@ Los Angeles Dodgers	5-7	Lowe (8-7)	O'Connor (3-7)	Broxton (1)	41,540	46-58
105	July 30	@ Los Angeles Dodgers	3-4	Broxton (2-0)	Rauch (3-2)	Saito (9)	43,346	46-59
106	July 31	@ San Francisco Giants	10-7	Astacio (2-1)	Lowry (5-7)	Cordero (18)	37,106	47-59

August (9-18)

#	Date	Opponent	Score	Win	Loss	Save	Attendance	Record
107	August 1	@ San Francisco Giants	4-1	Hernández (9-8)	Cain (7-8)	Cordero (19)	37,258	48-59
108	August 2	@ San Francisco Giants	6-8	Schmidt (8-7)	Armas (7-7)	Stanton (1)	38,283	48-60
109	August 4	@ San Diego Padres	6-2	Ortiz (8-9)	Young (9-5)		36,538	49-58
110	August 5	@ San Diego Padres	3-6	Embree (4-2)	Astacio (2-2)	Hoffman (30)	40,339	49-61
111	August 6	@ San Diego Padres	2-3 (10)	Brocail (2-0)	Bowie (0-1)		35,648	49-62
112	August 8	Florida Marlins	2-4	Nolasco (10-7)	Armas (7-8)	Borowski (23)	24,922	49-63
113	August 9	Florida Marlins	5-2	Ortiz (9-9)	Willis (7-9)	Cordero (20)	21,390	50-63
114	August 10	Florida Marlins	6-9	Moehler (6-8)	Wagner (0-1)	Borowski (24)	21,304	50-64
115	August 11	New York Mets	2-1	Traber (2-1)	Glavine (12-5)	Cordero (21)	29,414	51-64
116	August 12	New York Mets	4-6	Feliciano (5-2)	Schroder (0-1)	Wagner (27)	42,507	51-65
117	August 13	New York Mets	1-3	Bradford (4-2)	Rauch (3-3)	Wagner (28)	37,732	51-66
118	August 14	Atlanta Braves	4-10	James (5-3)	Ortiz (9-10)		21,550	51-67
119	August 15	Atlanta Braves	5-0	Astacio (3-2)	Cormier (2-4)		24,036	52-67
120	August 16	Atlanta Braves	9-6	Traber (3-1)	Smoltz (10-6)	Cordero (22)	28,094	53-67
121	August 17	Atlanta Braves	0-5	Villarreal (9-1)	Bergmann (0-1)		29,007	53-68
122	August 18	@ Philadelphia Phillies	6-4	Armas (8-8)	Myers (8-6)	Cordero (23)	30,123	54-68
123	August 19	@ Philadelphia Phillies	2-11	Hamels (6-6)	Ortiz (9-11)		34,881	54-69
124	August 20	@ Philadelphia Phillies	10-12	Wolf (2-0)	Astacio (3-3)	Rhodes (2)	36,023	54-70
125	August 21	@ Florida Marlins	1-3	Sánchez (5-2)	Traber (3-2)	Borowski (28)	9,316	54-71
126	August 22	@ Florida Marlins	5-7	Tankersley (2-1)	Wagner (0-2)	Borowski (29)	10,260	54-72
127	August 23	@ Florida Marlins	7-9	Olsen (10-7)	Armas (8-9)		11,318	54-73
128	August 25	@ Atlanta Braves	7-6	Wagner (1-2)	Paronto (1-2)	Rivera (1)	33,621	55-73
129	August 26	@ Atlanta Braves	1-10	Smoltz (12-6)	Astacio (3-4)		38,610	55-74
130	August 27	@ Atlanta Braves	6-13	McBride (4-1)	Traber (3-3)		30,587	55-75
131	August 29	Philadelphia Phillies	6-10	Myers (10-6)	Armas (8-10)	Rhodes (4)	25,735	55-76
132	August 30	Philadelphia Phillies	1-5	Hamels (7-7)	Ortiz (9-12)		24,438	55-77
133	August 31	Philadelphia Phillies	6-5 (10)	Wagner (2-2)	Fultz (3-1)		22,221	56-77

September (15-13)

#	Date	Opponent	Score	Win	Loss	Save	Attendance	Record
	September 1	Arizona Diamondbacks	Postponed (rain) Rescheduled for September 2 as part of a double header					
134	September 2 (1)	Arizona Diamondbacks	7-6	Cordero (6-4)	Lyon (2-4)		22,012	57-77
135	September 2 (2)	Arizona Diamondbacks	4-3	Rivera	Hernández (10-12)	Cordero (24)	22,922	58-77
136	September 3	Arizona Diamondbacks	5-3	Wagner (3-2)	Webb (14-6)	Rauch (1)	30,771	59-77
137	September 4	St. Louis Cardinals	4-1	Ortiz (10-12)	Marquis (14-13)		31,092	60-77
138	September 5	St. Louis Cardinals	0-2	Suppan (11-7)	Astacio (3-5)	Isringhausen (33)	25,937	60-78
139	September 6	St. Louis Cardinals	7-6	Cordero (7-4)	Isringhausen (4-8)		21,322	61-78
140	September 7	@ Colorado Rockies	5-10	Corpas (1-1)	Wagner (3-3)		18,617	61-79
141	September 8	@ Colorado Rockies	8-11	Field (1-1)	Rauch (3-4)	Fuentes (24)	22,214	61-80
142	September 9	@ Colorado Rockies	5-9	Venafro (1-0)	Ortiz (10-13)		22,735	61-81
143	September 10	@ Colorado Rockies	9-13	Mesa (1-5)	Schroder (0-2)	Fuentes (25)	18,647	61-82
144	September 11	@ Arizona Diamondbacks	7-6	Rauch (4-4)	Vizcaíno (4-5)	Cordero (25)	29,610	62-82
145	September 12	@ Arizona Diamondbacks	5-4	Rodríguez (1-1)	Peña (3-4)	Cordero (26)	31,182	63-82
146	September 13	@ Arizona Diamondbacks	2-4	Hernández (12-12)	Armas (8-11)	Valverde (16)	19,031	63-83
147	September 15	Milwaukee Brewers	2-5	Villanueva (1-1)	Ortiz (10-14)	Cordero (19)	21,168	63-84
148	September 16	Milwaukee Brewers	8-5	Astacio (4-5)	Bush (11-11)	Cordero (27)	24,252	64-84
149	September 17	Milwaukee Brewers	6-1	Rivera (3-0)	Davis (10-11)		26,128	65-84
150	September 18	Atlanta Braves	1-6	Davies (3-5)	Armas (8-12)		25,211	65-85
151	September 19	Atlanta Braves	9-2	Pérez (1-0)	James (10-4)		20,596	66-85
152	September 20	Atlanta Braves	3-7	Cormier (4-5)	Ortiz (10-15)		19,027	66-86
153	September 22	@ New York Mets	3-2	Astacio (5-5)	Hernández (10-11)	Cordero (28)	42,788	67-86
154	September 23	@ New York Mets	6-12	Maine (6-5)	O'Connor (3-8)		45,245	67-87
155	September 24	@ New York Mets	5-1	Armas (9-12)	Trachsel (15-8)		44,543	68-87
156	September 25	@ New York Mets	7-3	Pérez (2-0)	Glavine (14-7)		34,027	69-87
157	September 26	Philadelphia Phillies	4-3	Ortiz (11-15)	Myers (12-7)	Corero (29)	18,960	70-87
158	September 27	Philadelphia Phillies	7-8 (14)	Condrey (2-2)	Bergmann (0-2)	Castro (1)	21,809	70-88
159	September 28	Philadelphia Phillies	3-1	Traber (4-3)	Lieber (9-11)	Rauch (2)	18,324	71-88
160	September 29	New York Mets	3-4	Feliciano (7-2)	Rauch (4-5)	Wagner (40)	27,805	71-89
161	September 30	New York Mets	0-13	Glavine (15-7)	Pérez (2-1)		30,449	71-90

October (0-1)

#	Date	Opponent	Score	Win	Loss	Save	Attendance	Record
162	October 1	New York Mets	2-6	Mota (4-3)	Ortiz (11-16)		29,044	71-91

== Player stats ==
=== Batting ===
Note: Pos = Position; G = Games played; AB = At bats; R = Runs scored; H = Hits; 2B = Doubles; 3B = Triples; HR = Home runs; RBI = Runs batted in; AVG = Batting average; SB = Stolen bases

Complete offensive statistics are available here.

Pos	Player	G	AB	R	H	2B	3B	HR	RBI	AVG	SB
C	Brian Schneider	124	410	30	105	81	0	4	55	.256	2
1B	Nick Johnson	147	500	100	145	46	0	23	77	.290	10
2B	José Vidro	126	463	52	134	26	1	7	47	.289	1
SS	Royce Clayton	87	305	36	82	22	1	0	27	.269	8
3B	Ryan Zimmerman	157	614	84	176	47	3	20	110	.287	11
LF	Alfonso Soriano	159	647	119	179	41	2	46	95	.277	41
CF	Marlon Byrd	78	197	28	44	8	1	5	18	.223	3
RF	José Guillén	69	241	28	52	15	1	9	40	.216	1
SS	Felipe López	71	274	43	77	13	2	2	22	.281	21
RF	Austin Kearns	63	212	21	33	12	1	8	36	.250	2
2B	Marlon Anderson	109	215	31	59	13	2	5	23	.274	2
CF	Ryan Church	71	196	22	54	17	1	10	35	.276	6
C	Robert Fick	60	128	14	34	4	0	2	9	.266	1
UT	Damian Jackson	67	116	16	23	6	1	4	10	.198	1
UT	Daryle Ward	78	104	15	32	9	0	6	19	.308	0
2B	Bernie Castro	42	110	18	25	1	3	0	10	.227	7
CF	Nook Logan	27	90	13	27	2	1	1	8	.300	2
CF	Alex Escobar	33	87	14	31	3	2	4	18	.356	2
UT	Matt LeCroy	39	67	5	16	3	0	2	9	.239	0
C	Brandon Harper	18	41	6	12	3	0	2	6	.293	0
C	Wiki González	12	35	3	8	0	0	0	2	.229	0
IF	Brendan Harris	17	32	3	8	2	0	0	2	.250	0
CF	Brandon Watson	9	28	0	5	0	0	0	0	.179	0
UT	Henry Mateo	22	26	5	4	2	0	1	3	.154	0
OF	George Lombard	20	21	2	3	0	0	1	1	.143	2
RF	Mike Vento	9	18	3	5	1	0	0	1	.278	0
IF	Melvin Dorta	15	19	3	4	1	0	0	0	.211	0
OF	Luis Matos	14	15	2	3	2	0	0	0	.200	0
P	Ramón Ortiz	38	56	5	6	0	0	1	3	.107	0
P	Tony Armas Jr.	30	50	1	3	0	0	0	1	.060	0
P	Liván Hernández	26	45	6	12	4	0	1	6	.267	0
P	Pedro Astacio	15	25	2	5	0	0	0	0	.200	0
P	Michael O'Connor	21	31	2	2	0	0	0	1	.065	0
P	Billy Traber	15	13	1	1	0	0	0	1	.077	0
P	Jason Bergmann	29	8	0	0	0	0	0	0	.000	0
P	John Patterson	8	8	0	2	0	0	0	0	.250	0
P	Zach Day	5	7	0	0	0	0	0	0	.000	0
P	Shawn Hill	6	6	1	1	0	0	0	0	.167	0
P	Beltrán Pérez	9	6	0	3	0	0	0	0	.500	0
P	Saúl Rivera	54	4	0	0	0	0	0	0	.000	0
P	Jon Rauch	85	4	0	0	0	0	0	0	.000	0
P	Gary Majewski	46	3	0	0	0	0	0	0	.000	0
P	Ryan Wagner	26	3	0	1	0	0	0	0	.333	0
P	Ryan Drese	2	3	0	0	0	0	0	0	.000	0
P	Joey Eischen	22	2	0	0	0	0	0	0	.000	0
P	Chad Cordero	68	2	0	0	0	0	0	0	.000	0
P	Roy Corcoran	6	1	0	0	0	0	0	0	.000	0
P	Chris Schroder	21	2	0	0	0	0	0	0	.000	0
P	Micah Bowie	15	1	0	0	0	0	0	0	.000	0
P	Félix Rodríguez	31	1	0	0	0	0	0	0	.000	0
P	Travis Hughes	8	1	0	1	0	0	0	0	1.000	0
P	Mike Stanton	56	1	0	0	0	0	0	0	.000	0
P	Bill Bray	19	1	0	0	0	0	0	0	.000	0
P	Kevin Gryboski	6	0	0	0	0	0	0	0	–	0
P	Chris Booker	10	0	0	0	0	0	0	0	–	0
P	Santiago Ramírez	4	0	0	0	0	0	0	0	–	0
P	Brett Campbell	4	0	0	0	0	0	0	0	–	0
	Team totals	162	5495	746	1437	322	22	164	695	.262	123

=== Pitching ===
Note: Pos = Position; W = Wins; L = Losses; ERA = Earned run average; G = Games pitched; GS = Games started; SV = Saves; IP = Innings pitched; H = Hits allowed; R = Runs allowed; ER = Earned runs allowed; BB = Walks allowed; K = Strikeouts

Complete pitching statistics are available here.

Pos	Player	W	L	ERA	G	GS	SV	IP	H	R	ER	BB	K
SP	Ramón Ortiz	11	16	5.57	33	33	0	190.2	230	127	118	64	104
SP	Tony Armas Jr.	9	12	5.03	30	30	0	154.0	167	96	86	64	97
SP	Liván Hernández	9	8	5.34	24	24	0	146.2	176	94	87	52	89
SP	Michael O'Connor	3	8	4.80	21	20	0	105.0	96	61	56	45	59
SP	Pedro Astacio	5	5	5.98	17	17	0	90.1	109	64	60	31	42
CL	Chad Cordero	7	4	3.19	68	0	29	73.1	59	27	26	22	69
RP	Jon Rauch	4	5	3.35	85	0	2	91.1	78	37	34	36	86
RP	Saúl Rivera	3	0	3.43	54	0	1	60.1	59	28	23	32	41
RP	Gary Majewski	3	2	3.58	46	0	0	55.1	49	24	22	25	34
RP	Mike Stanton	3	5	4.47	56	0	0	44.1	47	22	22	21	30
	Jason Bergmann	0	2	6.68	29	6	0	64.2	81	49	48	27	54
	Billy Traber	4	3	6.44	15	8	0	43.1	53	33	31	14	25
	John Patterson	1	2	4.43	8	8	0	40.2	36	21	20	9	42
	Chris Schroder	0	2	6.35	21	0	0	28.1	23	21	20	15	39
	Shawn Hill	1	3	4.66	6	6	0	36.2	43	20	19	12	16
	Félix Rodríguez	1	1	7.67	31	0	0	29.1	32	25	25	16	15
	Zach Day	1	3	4.73	5	5	0	26.2	29	15	14	11	13
	Bill Bray	1	1	3.91	19	0	0	23.0	24	11	10	9	16
	Beltrán Pérez	2	1	3.86	8	3	0	21.0	16	9	9	13	9
	Ryan Wagner	3	3	4.70	26	0	0	30.2	36	21	16	15	20
	Micah Bowie	0	1	1.37	15	0	0	19.2	11	3	3	7	11
	Joey Eischen	0	1	8.59	22	0	0	14.2	18	18	14	19	18
	Chris Booker	0	0	3.68	10	0	0	7.1	5	3	3	1	7
	Travis Hughes	0	0	6.35	8	0	0	11.1	13	8	8	6	4
	Ryan Drese	0	2	5.19	2	2	0	8.2	9	8	5	8	5
	Kevin Gryboski	0	0	14.29	6	0	0	5.2	14	11	9	2	4
	Roy Corcoran	0	1	11.12	6	0	0	5.2	12	8	7	4	6
	Brett Campbell	0	0	10.38	4	0	0	4.1	4	5	5	2	4
	Santiago Ramírez	0	0	8.10	4	0	0	3.1	6	3	3	2	1
	Team totals	71	91	5.03	162	162	32	1436.1	1535	872	803	584	960

=== Team leaders ===
Qualifying players only.

==== Batting ====
Stat	Player	Total
Avg.	Nick Johnson	.290
HR	Alfonso Soriano	46
RBI	Ryan Zimmerman	110
R	Alfonso Soriano	119
H	Alfonso Soriano	179
SB	Alfonso Soriano	41

==== Pitching ====
Stat	Player	Total
W	Ramón Ortiz	11
L	Ramón Ortiz	16
ERA	Ramón Ortiz	5.57
SO	Ramón Ortiz	104
SV	Chad Cordero	29
IP	Ramón Ortiz	190.2

== Awards and honors ==
=== All-Stars ===
- Alfonso Soriano, OF

=== Annual awards ===
- Silver Slugger: Alfonso Soriano, OF

== Farm system ==
Level	Team	League	Manager
AAA	New Orleans Zephyrs	Pacific Coast League	Tim Foli
AA	Harrisburg Senators	Eastern League	John Stearns
A	Potomac Nationals	Carolina League	Randy Knorr and Edgar Caceres
A	Savannah Sand Gnats	South Atlantic League	Bobby Williams
A-Short Season	Vermont Lake Monsters	New York–Penn League	José Alguacil
Rookie	GCL Nationals	Gulf Coast League	Bob Henley
