= 2006 New York Mets season =

2006 New York Mets
- National League East champions
- League: National League
- Division: East
- Ballpark: Shea Stadium
- City: New York
- Record: 97–65 (.599)
- Divisional place: 1st
- Owners: Fred Wilpon
- General manager: Omar Minaya
- Manager: Willie Randolph
- Television: WPIX; SportsNet New York (Gary Cohen, Ron Darling, Keith Hernandez, Steve Berthiaume, Matt Yallof, Ralph Kiner)
- Radio: WFAN (Howie Rose, Ed Coleman, Tom McCarthy); WADO (Spanish) (Juan Alicea, Billy Berroa)

The 2006 New York Mets season was the 45th regular season for the Mets. They went 97–65 and won the National League East, a feat the team would not repeat until 2015. They were managed by Willie Randolph. They played home games at Shea Stadium. They used the marketing slogan of "The Team. The Time. The Mets." throughout the season. On September 18, the Mets clinched their first NL East title since 1988, in the process breaking the Atlanta Braves' streak of 11 straight NL East titles.

In the postseason, the Mets swept the Los Angeles Dodgers in the NLDS, but they lost to the 83-win St. Louis Cardinals in the NLCS in seven games.

== Offseason ==
- November 18, 2005: Xavier Nady was traded to the Mets for Mike Cameron.
- November 24, 2005: Carlos Delgado was traded to the Mets with cash for Mike Jacobs, Yusmeiro Petit, and Grant Psomas.
- November 29, 2005: Billy Wagner was signed as a free agent with the Mets.
- December 5, 2005: Paul Lo Duca was traded to the Mets for Dante Brinkley and Gaby Hernandez.
- December 12, 2005: Julio Franco was signed as a free agent with the Mets.
- January 22, 2006: Kris Benson was traded by the Mets to the Baltimore Orioles for Jorge Julio and John Maine.

== Regular season ==
=== Season standings ===
==== National League East ====
NL East
Team	W	L	Pct.	GB	Home	Road
New York Mets	97	65	.599	—	50‍–‍31	47‍–‍34
Philadelphia Phillies	85	77	.525	12	41‍–‍40	44‍–‍37
Atlanta Braves	79	83	.488	18	40‍–‍41	39‍–‍42
Florida Marlins	78	84	.481	19	42‍–‍39	36‍–‍45
Washington Nationals	71	91	.438	26	41‍–‍40	30‍–‍51

==== Record vs. opponents ====
2006 National League record Source: MLB Standings Grid – 2006
Team	AZ	ATL	CHC	CIN	COL	FLA	HOU	LAD	MIL	NYM	PHI	PIT	SD	SF	STL	WAS	AL
Arizona	—	6–1	4–2	4–2	12–7	2–4	4–5	8–10	3–3	1–6	1–5	5–1	9–10	8–11	4–3	1–5	4–11
Atlanta	1–6	—	6–1	4–3	3–3	11–8	3–4	3–3	2–4	7–11	7–11	3–3	7–2	3–4	4–2	10–8	5–10
Chicago	2–4	1–6	—	10–9	2–4	2–4	7–8	4–2	8–8	3–3	2–5	6–9	0–7	2–4	11–8	2–4	4–11
Cincinnati	2–4	3–4	9–10	—	5–1	4–2	10–5	0–6	9–10	3–4	2–4	9–7	2–4	2–5	9–6	5–1	6-9
Colorado	7–12	3–3	4–2	1–5	—	3–3	4–2	4–15	2–4	1–5	3–4	3–3	10–9	10–8	2–7	8–0	11–4
Florida	4–2	8–11	4–2	2–4	3–3	—	3–4	1–5	7–0	8–11	6–13	5–2	3–3	3–3	1–5	11–7	9–9
Houston	5–4	4–3	8–7	5–10	2–4	4-3	—	3–3	10–5	2–4	2–4	13–3	3–3	1–5	9–7	4–4	7–11
Los Angeles	10–8	3–3	2–4	6–0	15–4	5–1	3–3	—	4–2	3–4	4–3	6–4	5–13	13–6	0–7	4–2	5–10
Milwaukee	3–3	4–2	8–8	10–9	4–2	0–7	5–10	2–4	—	3–3	5–1	7–9	4–3	6–3	7–9	1–5	6–9
New York	6–1	11–7	3–3	4–3	5–1	11–8	4–2	4–3	3–3	—	11–8	5–4	5–2	3–3	4–2	12–6	6–9
Philadelphia	5-1	11–7	5–2	4–2	4–3	13–6	4–2	3–4	1–5	8–11	—	3–3	2–4	5–1	3–3	9–10	5–13
Pittsburgh	1–5	3–3	9–6	7–9	3–3	2–5	3–13	4–6	9–7	4–5	3–3	—	1–5	6–1	6–9	3–3	3–12
San Diego	10–9	2–7	7–0	4–2	9–10	3–3	3–3	13–5	3–4	2–5	4–2	5–1	—	7–12	4–2	5–1	7–8
San Francisco	11–8	4–3	4–2	5–2	8–10	3–3	5–1	6–13	3–6	3–3	1–5	1–6	12–7	—	1–4	1–5	8–7
St. Louis	3–4	2–4	8–11	6–9	7–2	5-1	7–9	7–0	9–7	2–4	3–3	9–6	2–4	4–1	—	4–3	5–10
Washington	5–1	8–10	4–2	1–5	0–8	7-11	4–4	2–4	5–1	6–12	10–9	3–3	1–5	5–1	3–4	—	7–11

=== Transactions ===
- April 26, 2006: Michael Tucker signed as a free agent with the Mets.
- May 24, 2006: Jorge Julio was traded by the Mets to the Arizona Diamondbacks for Orlando Hernández.
- May 26, 2026: Geremi Gonzalez was traded by the Mets to the Milwaukee Brewers for Mike Adams.
- July 31, 2006: Xavier Nady was traded by the Mets to the Pittsburgh Pirates for Roberto Hernandez and Óliver Pérez.
- August 8, 2006: Ricky Ledée was claimed off waivers by the Mets from the Los Angeles Dodgers.
- August 22, 2006: Shawn Green was traded to the Mets with cash for Evan MacLane.

=== Roster ===
2006 New York Mets
**Roster**
**Pitchers**: 40 Brian Bannister; 19 Heath Bell; 53 Chad Bradford; 25 Pedro Feliciano; 43 Bartolomé Fortunato; 47 Tom Glavine; 32 Geremi González; 48 Aaron Heilman; 26 Orlando Hernández; 39 Roberto Hernández; 49 Philip Humber; 34 Jorge Julio; 17 José Lima; 33 John Maine; 45 Pedro Martínez; 59 Guillermo Mota; 27 Darren Oliver; 36 Henry Owens; 34 Mike Pelfrey; 46 Óliver Pérez; 50 Duaner Sánchez; 59 Alay Soler; 29 Steve Trachsel; 13 Billy Wagner; 32 Dave Williams; 38 Víctor Zambrano	**Catchers**: 11 Ramon Castro; 6 Mike DiFelice; 16 Paul Lo Duca; 36 Kelly Stinnett; **Infielders**: 21 Carlos Delgado; 23 Julio Franco; 1 Anderson Hernández; 25 Kazuo Matsui; 7 José Reyes; 18 José Valentín; 4 Chris Woodward; 5 David Wright	**Outfielders**: 15 Carlos Beltrán; 10 Endy Chávez; 20 Víctor Díaz; 30 Cliff Floyd; 20 Shawn Green; 9 Ricky Ledée; 32 Eli Marrero; 44 Lastings Milledge; 22 Xavier Nady; 22 Michael Tucker	**Manager**: 12 Willie Randolph; **Coaches**: 50 Manny Acta (third base); 2 Sandy Alomar Sr. (bench); 56 Guy Conti (bullpen); 54 Rick Down (hitting); 53 Jerry Manuel (first base); 51 Rick Peterson (pitching)

=== Game log ===
Legend
Mets Win	Mets Loss	Game Postponed	All-Star Game	Clinched division
Bold = Mets team member

2006 Game Log
Overall: 97–65 (Home: 50–31; Away: 47–34)
April: (16–8) Home: 7–4; Away: 9–4

#	Date	Opponent	Score	Win	Loss	Save	Location	Attendance	Record
1	April 3	Nationals	3–2	**Glavine** (1–0)	Hernandez (0–1)	**Wagner** (1)	**Shea Stadium**	54,371	1–0
2	April 5	Nationals	5–9 (10)	Cordero (1–0)	**Julio** (0–1)	—	**Shea Stadium**	19,557	1–1
3	April 6	Nationals	10–5	**Martinez** (1–0)	Ortiz (0–1)	—	**Shea Stadium**	25,839	2–1
4	April 7	Marlins	9–3	**Trachsel** (1–0)	Vargas (0–1)	—	**Shea Stadium**	39,761	3–1
–	April 8	Marlins	Postponed (rain); rescheduled for July 8						
5	April 9	Marlins	3–2	**Wagner** (1–0)	Martinez (0–1)	—	**Shea Stadium**	55,255	4–1
6	April 11	@ Nationals	7–1	**Bannister** (1–0)	Ortiz (0–2)	—	RFK Stadium	40,530	5–1
7	April 12	@ Nationals	3–1	**Martinez** (2–0)	Armas (0–2)	**Wagner** (2)	RFK Stadium	29,985	6–1
8	April 13	@ Nationals	13–4	**Zambrano** (1–0)	Hernandez (1–2)	—	RFK Stadium	25,465	7–1
9	April 14	Brewers	4–3	**Glavine** (2–0)	Capuano (1–2)	**Wagner** (3)	**Shea Stadium**	37,489	8–1
10	April 15	Brewers	2–8	Ohka (1–1)	**Trachsel** (1–1)	—	**Shea Stadium**	55,831	8–2
11	April 16	Brewers	9–3	**Bannister** (2–0)	Sheets (0–1)	—	**Shea Stadium**	38,119	9–2
12	April 17	Braves	4–3	**Martinez** (3–0)	Sosa (0–3)	**Wagner** (4)	**Shea Stadium**	36,867	10–2
13	April 18	Braves	1–7	Davies (1–1)	**Zambrano** (1–1)	—	**Shea Stadium**	30,322	10–3
14	April 19	Braves	1–2	Hudson (1–1)	**Glavine** (2–1)	—	**Shea Stadium**	40,861	10–4
15	April 20	@ Padres	7–2	**Sanchez** (1–0)	Linebrink (1–2)	—	Petco Park	28,791	11–4
16	April 21	@ Padres	1–2 (14)	Sweeney (1–0)	**Bradford** (0–1)	—	Petco Park	38,541	11–5
17	April 22	@ Padres	8–1	**Martinez** (4–0)	Young (2–1)	—	Petco Park	39,389	12–5
18	April 23	@ Padres	4–7	Hensley (1–1)	**Zambrano** (1–2)	Hoffman (3)	Petco Park	34,109	12–6
19	April 24	@ Giants	2–6	Cain (1–2)	**Glavine** (2–2)	—	AT&T Park	36,855	12–7
20	April 25	@ Giants	4–1	**Trachsel** (2–1)	Wright (2–1)	**Wagner** (5)	AT&T Park	35,775	13–7
21	April 26	@ Giants	9–7 (11)	**Oliver** (1–0)	Munter (0–1)	—	AT&T Park	34,454	14–7
22	April 28	@ Braves	5–2	**Martinez** (5–0)	Smoltz (1–2)	**Wagner** (6)	Turner Field	45,389	15–7
23	April 29	@ Braves	1–0	**Glavine** (3–2)	Thomson (0–1)	**Wagner** (7)	Turner Field	46,387	16–7
24	April 30	@ Braves	5–8	Davies (2–2)	**Trachsel** (2–2)	Reitsma (5)	Turner Field	35,245	16–8

May: (16–12) Home: 11–5; Away: 5–7

#	Date	Opponent	Score	Win	Loss	Save	Location	Attendance	Record
25	May 1	Nationals	2–1	**Wagner** (2–0)	Majewski (1–2)	—	**Shea Stadium**	28,310	17–8
26	May 2	Nationals	2–6	O'Connor (1–0)	**Maine** (0–1)	—	**Shea Stadium**	34,046	17–9
27	May 3	Pirates	4–3 (12)	**Bradford** (1–1)	Gonzalez (0–2)	—	**Shea Stadium**	33,668	18–9
28	May 4	Pirates	6–0	**Glavine** (4–2)	Maholm (1–4)	—	**Shea Stadium**	30,756	19–9
29	May 5	Braves	8–7 (14)	**Julio** (1–1)	Sosa (0–5)	—	**Shea Stadium**	47,720	20–9
30	May 6	Braves	6–5	**Fortunato** (1–0)	Hudson (2–3)	**Julio** (1)	**Shea Stadium**	48,369	21–9
31	May 7	Braves	3–13	Smoltz (2–2)	**Lima** (0–1)	—	**Shea Stadium**	48,100	21–10
32	May 9	@ Phillies	4–5	Gordon (2–1)	**Heilman** (0–1)	—	Citizens Bank Park	33,787	21–11
33	May 10	@ Phillies	13–2	**Glavine** (5–2)	Lidle (3–4)	—	Citizens Bank Park	30,269	22–11
34	May 11	@ Phillies	0–2 (5)	Floyd (4–2)	**Trachsel** (2–3)	—	Citizens Bank Park	28,224	22–12
35	May 12	@ Brewers	6–9	Bush (3–4)	**Lima** (0–2)	Turnbow (12)	Miller Park	26,362	22–13
36	May 13	@ Brewers	9–8	**Bradford** (2–1)	Turnbow (0–1)	**Wagner** (8)	Miller Park	45,150	23–13
37	May 14	@ Brewers	5–6 (10)	de la Rosa (2–0)	**Bradford** (2–2)	—	Miller Park	28,104	23–14
38	May 16	@ Cardinals	8–3	**Glavine** (6–2)	Suppan (4–3)	—	Busch Stadium	39,616	24–14
39	May 17	@ Cardinals	0–1	Mulder (5–1)	**Trachsel** (2–4)	Isringhausen (12)	Busch Stadium	40,573	24–15
40	May 18	@ Cardinals	3–6	Marquis (5–4)	**Lima** (0–3)	Isringhausen (13)	Busch Stadium	41,273	24–16
41	May 19	Yankees	7–6	**Wagner** (3–0)	Rivera (1–3)	—	**Shea Stadium**	56,289	25–16
42	May 20	Yankees	4–5 (11)	Rivera (2–3)	**Julio** (1–2)	—	**Shea Stadium**	56,185	25–17
43	May 21	Yankees	4–3	**Glavine** (7–2)	Small (0–2)	**Wagner** (9)	**Shea Stadium**	56,205	26–17
44	May 23	Phillies	9–8 (16)	**Oliver** (2–0)	Madson (4–3)	—	**Shea Stadium**	28,958	27–17
45	May 24	Phillies	5–4	**Feliciano** (1–0)	Cormier (2–1)	**Wagner** (10)	**Shea Stadium**	32,094	28–17
46	May 25	Phillies	3–5	Myers (3–2)	**Feliciano** (1–1)	Gordon (14)	**Shea Stadium**	51,365	28–18
47	May 26	@ Marlins	1–5	Johnson (4–2)	**Martinez** (5–1)	—	Dolphins Stadium	15,338	28–19
48	May 27	@ Marlins	7–4	**Glavine** (8–2)	Willis (1–6)	**Wagner** (11)	Dolphins Stadium	13,037	29–19
49	May 28	@ Marlins	7–3	**Hernandez** (3–4)	Nolasco (3–2)	—	Dolphins Stadium	17,488	30–19
50	May 29	Diamondbacks	8–7	**Sanchez** (2–0)	Valverde (2–3)	—	**Shea Stadium**	39,826	31–19
51	May 30	Diamondbacks	2–7	Batista (5–2)	**Soler** (0–1)	—	**Shea Stadium**	35,448	31–20
52	May 31	Diamondbacks	1–0 (13)	**Sanchez** (3–0)	Grimsley (1–2)	—	**Shea Stadium**	37,735	32–20

June: (15–12) Home: 4–6; Away: 11–6

#	Date	Opponent	Score	Win	Loss	Save	Location	Attendance	Record
–	June 2	Giants	Postponed (rain); rescheduled for June 3						
53	June 3 (1)	Giants	4–6	Cain (4–5)	**Hernandez** (3–5)	**Benitez** (4)	**Shea Stadium**	N/A	32–21
54	June 3 (2)	Giants	3–2 (11)	**Sanchez** (4–0)	Wilson (0–1)	—	**Shea Stadium**	45,576	33–21
55	June 4	Giants	6–7 (12)	Sanchez (1–0)	**Feliciano** (1–2)	Accardo (1)	**Shea Stadium**	48,791	33–22
56	June 5	@ Dodgers	4–1	**Soler** (1–1)	Tomko (5–4)	**Bradford** (1)	Dodger Stadium	34,420	34–22
57	June 6	@ Dodgers	5–8	Lowe (5–3)	**Martinez** (5–2)	Gagne (1)	Dodger Stadium	46,347	34–23
58	June 7	@ Dodgers	9–7	**Glavine** (9–2)	Perez (4–2)	**Wagner** (12)	Dodger Stadium	44,230	35–23
59	June 8	@ Diamondbacks	7–1	**Hernandez** (4–5)	Vargas (6–3)	—	Chase Field	20,845	36–23
60	June 9	@ Diamondbacks	10–6	**Trachsel** (3–4)	Batista (6–3)	—	Chase Field	23,671	37–23
61	June 10	@ Diamondbacks	5–0	**Soler** (2–1)	Webb (8–1)	—	Chase Field	33,671	38–23
62	June 11	@ Diamondbacks	15–2	**Martinez** (6–2)	Ortiz (0–5)	—	Chase Field	28,475	39–23
63	June 13	@ Phillies	9–7	**Bradford** (3–2)	Madson (6–4)	**Wagner** (13)	Citizens Bank Park	37,964	40–23
64	June 14	@ Phillies	9–3	**Oliver** (3–0)	Myers (4–3)	—	Citizens Bank Park	38,811	41–23
65	June 15	@ Phillies	5–4	**Trachsel** (4–4)	Lidle (4–6)	**Wagner** (14)	Citizens Bank Park	45,102	42–23
66	June 16	Orioles	3–6	Bedard (6–6)	**Heilman** (0–2)	Ray (17)	**Shea Stadium**	45,967	42–24
67	June 17	Orioles	2–4	Benson (8–5)	**Martinez** (6–3)	Ray (18)	**Shea Stadium**	52,320	42–25
68	June 18	Orioles	9–4	**Glavine** (10–2)	Loewen (0–2)	—	**Shea Stadium**	43,393	43–25
69	June 19	Reds	2–4	Arroyo (9–3)	**Hernandez** (4–6)	—	**Shea Stadium**	41,874	43–26
70	June 20	Reds	9–2	**Trachsel** (5–4)	Ramirez (2–6)	—	**Shea Stadium**	38,991	44–26
71	June 21	Reds	5–6	Standridge (1–0)	**Wagner** (3–1)	Coffey (5)	**Shea Stadium**	49,758	44–27
72	June 22	Reds	6–2	**Martinez** (7–3)	Milton (4–4)	**Bradford** (2)	**Shea Stadium**	46,767	45–27
73	June 23	@ Blue Jays	6–1	**Glavine** (11–2)	Janssen (5–6)	—	Rogers Centre	28,507	46–27
74	June 24	@ Blue Jays	4–7	Halladay (9–2)	**Hernandez** (4–7)	Ryan (21)	Rogers Centre	31,327	46–28
75	June 25	@ Blue Jays	7–4	**Trachsel** (6–4)	Towers (1–9)	**Wagner** (15)	Rogers Centre	32,277	47–28
76	June 27	@ Red Sox	4–9	Lester (3–0)	**Soler** (2–2)	—	Fenway Park	36,250	47–29
77	June 28	@ Red Sox	2–10	Beckett (10–3)	**Martinez** (7–4)	—	Fenway Park	36,035	47–30
78	June 29	@ Red Sox	2–4	Schilling (10–2)	**Heilman** (0–3)	Papelbon (24)	Fenway Park	36,028	47–31
79	June 30	@ Yankees	0–2	Villone (2–1)	**Hernandez** (4–8)	Rivera (18)	Yankee Stadium	55,245	47–32

July: (16–9) Home: 8–6; Away: 8–3

#	Date	Opponent	Score	Win	Loss	Save	Location	Attendance	Record
80	July 1	@ Yankees	8–3	**Trachsel** (7–4)	Johnson (9–7)	—	Yankee Stadium	55,132	48–32
81	July 2	@ Yankees	7–16	Villone (3–1)	**Soler** (2–3)	—	Yankee Stadium	55,212	48–33
82	July 3	Pirates	1–11	Maholm (3–7)	**Maine** (0–2)	—	**Shea Stadium**	54,111	48–34
83	July 4	Pirates	7–6	**Sanchez** (5–0)	R. Hernandez (0–2)	**Wagner** (16)	**Shea Stadium**	38,487	49–34
84	July 5	Pirates	5–0	**O. Hernandez** (5–8)	Wells (0–4)	—	**Shea Stadium**	40,360	50–34
85	July 6	Pirates	7–5	**Trachsel** (8–4)	Gorzelanny (0–1)	**Wagner** (17)	**Shea Stadium**	39,743	51–34
86	July 7	Marlins	3–7	Willis (6–7)	**Lima** (0–4)	—	**Shea Stadium**	41,276	51–35
87	July 8 (1)	Marlins	2–3	Johnson (8–4)	**Maine** (0–3)	Borowski (16)	**Shea Stadium**	N/A	51–36
88	July 8 (2)	Marlins	17–3	**Pelfrey** (1–0)	Nolasco (6–6)	—	**Shea Stadium**	41,477	52–36
89	July 9	Marlins	7–6	**Feliciano** (2–2)	Kensing (1–2)	**Wagner** (18)	**Shea Stadium**	39,829	53–36
**77th All-Star Game in Pittsburgh, Pennsylvania**
90	July 14	@ Cubs	6–3	**Trachsel** (9–4)	Maddux (7–10)	—	Wrigley Field	40,782	54–36
91	July 15	@ Cubs	2–9	Zambrano (9–3)	**Glavine** (11–3)	—	Wrigley Field	41,368	54–37
92	July 16	@ Cubs	13–7	**Feliciano** (3–2)	Marshall (5–8)	—	Wrigley Field	40,157	55–37
93	July 18	@ Reds	8–3	**Pelfrey** (2–0)	Milton (6–5)	—	Great American Ball Park	27,138	56–37
94	July 19	@ Reds	4–7	Coffey (5–4)	**Sanchez** (5–1)	Guardado (9)	Great American Ball Park	26,300	56–38
95	July 20	@ Reds	4–2 (10)	**Feliciano** (4–2)	Majewski (3–3)	**Wagner** (19)	Great American Ball Park	28,729	57–38
96	July 21	Astros	7–0	**Maine** (1–3)	Buchholz (6–8)	—	**Shea Stadium**	46,228	58–38
97	July 22	Astros	4–3	**O. Hernandez** (6–8)	Backe (1–1)	**Wagner** (20)	**Shea Stadium**	46,574	59–38
98	July 23	Astros	4–8	Oswalt (7–7)	**Pelfrey** (2–1)	—	**Shea Stadium**	46,375	59–39
99	July 24	Cubs	7–8	Maddux (8–11)	**Trachsel** (9–5)	Dempster (17)	**Shea Stadium**	45,631	59–40
100	July 25	Cubs	6–8	Zambrano (11–3)	**Glavine** (11–4)	Howry (3)	**Shea Stadium**	47,686	59–41
101	July 26	Cubs	1–0 (10)	**Heilman** (1–3)	Rusch (3–8)	—	**Shea Stadium**	40,299	60–41
102	July 28	@ Braves	6–4	**Martinez** (8–4)	Ramirez (5–4)	**Wagner** (21)	Turner Field	53,943	61–41
103	July 29	@ Braves	11–3	**O. Hernandez** (7–8)	Hudson (8–9)	—	Turner Field	49,047	62–41
104	July 30	@ Braves	10–6	**Oliver** (4–0)	James (4–2)	**Wagner** (22)	Turner Field	40,526	63–41

August: (19–9) Home: 13–2; Away: 6–7

#	Date	Opponent	Score	Win	Loss	Save	Location	Attendance	Record
105	August 1	@ Marlins	5–6	Herges (1–2)	**Wagner** (3–2)	—	Dolphins Stadium	16,641	63–42
106	August 2	@ Marlins	6–5	**Trachsel** (10–5)	Nolasco (9–7)	**Wagner** (23)	Dolphins Stadium	18,239	64–42
107	August 3	@ Marlins	1–4	Willis (7–8)	**Heilman** (1–4)	Borowski (22)	Dolphins Stadium	24,097	64–43
108	August 4	Phillies	3–5	Madson (10–7)	**Oliver** (4–1)	Gordon (27)	**Shea Stadium**	43,209	64–44
109	August 5	Phillies	4–3	**Glavine** (12–4)	Lieber (4–9)	**Wagner** (24)	**Shea Stadium**	44,829	65–44
110	August 6	Phillies	8–1	**Maine** (2–3)	Mathieson (1–3)	—	**Shea Stadium**	39,144	66–44
111	August 8	Padres	3–2	**Trachsel** (11–5)	W. Williams (4–4)	**Wagner** (25)	**Shea Stadium**	46,167	67–44
112	August 9	Padres	4–3	**Martinez** (9–4)	Hensley (7–9)	**Wagner** (26)	**Shea Stadium**	49,979	68–44
113	August 10	Padres	7–3	**Hernandez** (8–8)	Brocail (2–1)	—	**Shea Stadium**	39,649	69–44
114	August 11	@ Nationals	1–2	Traber (2–1)	**Glavine** (12–5)	Cordero (21)	RFK Stadium	29,414	69–45
115	August 12	@ Nationals	6–4	**Feliciano** (5–2)	Schroder (0–1)	**Wagner** (27)	RFK Stadium	42,507	70–45
116	August 13	@ Nationals	3–1	**Bradford** (4–2)	Rauch (3–3)	**Wagner** (28)	RFK Stadium	37,732	71–45
117	August 14	@ Phillies	0–13	Hamels (5–6)	**Martinez** (9–5)	—	Citizens Bank Park	36,888	71–46
118	August 15	@ Phillies	4–11	Wolf (1–0)	**Hernandez** (8–9)	—	Citizens Bank Park	40,283	71–47
119	August 16	@ Phillies	0–3	Lieber (5–9)	**Glavine** (12–6)	—	Citizens Bank Park	42,156	71–48
120	August 17	@ Phillies	7–2	**Maine** (3–3)	Mathieson (1–4)	—	Citizens Bank Park	45,775	72–48
121	August 18	Rockies	6–3	**Trachsel** (12–5)	Kim (7–8)	**Wagner** (29)	**Shea Stadium**	35,325	73–48
122	August 19	Rockies	7–4	**Heilman** (2–4)	Francis (9–10)	**Wagner** (30)	**Shea Stadium**	55,085	74–48
123	August 20	Rockies	2–0	**Hernandez** (9–9)	Jennings (7–10)	**Wagner** (31)	**Shea Stadium**	40,654	75–48
124	August 22	Cardinals	8–7	**Heilman** (3–4)	Isringhausen (4–7)	—	**Shea Stadium**	49,661	76–48
125	August 23	Cardinals	10–8	**Trachsel** (13–5)	Mulder (6–6)	**Wagner** (32)	**Shea Stadium**	49,329	77–48
126	August 24	Cardinals	6–2	**D. Williams** (3–3)	Marquis (13–12)	—	**Shea Stadium**	45,497	78–48
127	August 25	Phillies	3–4	Wolf (3–0)	**Bannister** (2–1)	Madson (2)	**Shea Stadium**	41,707	78–49
128	August 26	Phillies	11–5	**Feliciano** (6–2)	White (2–1)	—	**Shea Stadium**	47,019	79–49
–	August 27	Phillies	Postponed (rain); rescheduled for August 28						
129	August 28	Phillies	8–3	**Maine** (4–3)	Moyer (7–13)	—	**Shea Stadium**	45,868	80–49
130	August 29	@ Rockies	10–5	**Trachsel** (13–5)	Kim (7–10)	—	Coors Field	23,454	81–49
131	August 30	@ Rockies	11–3	**D. Williams** (4–3)	Fogg (9–9)	—	Coors Field	22,945	82–49
132	August 31	@ Rockies	4–8	Francis (11–10)	**Perez** (2–11)	—	Coors Field	23,273	82–50

September: (14–15) Home: 7–8; Away: 7–7

#	Date	Opponent	Score	Win	Loss	Save	Location	Attendance	Record
133	September 1	@ Astros	8–7	**Mota** (2–3)	Springer (1–1)	**Wagner** (33)	Minute Maid Park	35,548	83–50
134	September 2	@ Astros	4–2	**Maine** (5–3)	Hirsh (2–3)	**Wagner** (34)	Minute Maid Park	43,218	84–50
135	September 3	@ Astros	1–2	Oswalt (11–8)	**Hernandez** (9–10)	Lidge (29)	Minute Maid Park	43,018	84–51
136	September 4	Braves	0–5	James (8–3)	**Trachsel** (14–6)	—	**Shea Stadium**	42,428	84–52
–	September 5	Braves	Postponed (rain); rescheduled for September 6						
137	September 6 (1)	Braves	4–1	**Williams** (5–3)	Smoltz (12–8)	**Wagner** (35)	**Shea Stadium**	N/A	85–52
138	September 6 (2)	Braves	8–0	**O. Perez** (3–11)	Davies (2–5)	—	**Shea Stadium**	40,536	86–52
139	September 7	Dodgers	7–0	**Glavine** (13–6)	Penny (15–8)	—	**Shea Stadium**	48,583	87–52
140	September 8	Dodgers	0–5	Kuo (1–4)	**Maine** (5–4)	—	**Shea Stadium**	52,077	87–53
141	September 9	Dodgers	3–2	**Hernandez** (10–10)	Maddux (12–13)	**Wagner** (36)	**Shea Stadium**	47,062	88–53
142	September 10	Dodgers	1–9	Stults (1–0)	**Trachsel** (14–7)	—	**Shea Stadium**	48,760	88–54
143	September 11	@ Marlins	5–16	Sanchez (8–2)	**Williams** (5–4)	—	Dolphins Stadium	13,725	88–55
144	September 12	@ Marlins	6–4	**Mota** (3–3)	Resop (1–1)	**Wagner** (37)	Dolphins Stadium	15,163	89–55
145	September 13	@ Marlins	7–4 (11)	**Heilman** (4–4)	Herges (1–3)	**Wagner** (38)	Dolphins Stadium	20,225	90–55
146	September 15	@ Pirates	3–5	Maholm (8–10)	**Martinez** (9–6)	Torres (8)	PNC Park	24,410	90–56
147	September 16	@ Pirates	2–3	Capps (8–1)	**Heilman** (4–5)	—	PNC Park	37,623	90–57
148	September 17	@ Pirates	0–3	Duke (10–13)	**Maine** (5–5)	Torres (9)	PNC Park	34,866	90–58
149	September 18	Marlins	4–0	**Trachsel** (15–7)	Moehler (7–9)	—	**Shea Stadium**	46,729	91–58
150	September 19	Marlins	3–2	**Glavine** (14–6)	Resop (1–2)	**Wagner** (39)	**Shea Stadium**	42,407	92–58
151	September 20	Marlins	3–6	Willis (12–11)	**O. Perez** (3–12)	Borowski (35)	**Shea Stadium**	37,911	92–59
152	September 21	Marlins	2–5	Sanchez (9–3)	**Martinez** (9–7)	Borowski (36)	**Shea Stadium**	44,966	92–60
153	September 22	Nationals	2–3	Astacio (5–5)	**Hernandez** (10–11)	Cordero (28)	**Shea Stadium**	42,788	92–61
154	September 23	Nationals	12–6	**Maine** (6–5)	O'Connor (3–8)	—	**Shea Stadium**	45,247	93–61
155	September 24	Nationals	1–5	Armas (9–12)	**Trachsel** (15–8)	—	**Shea Stadium**	44,543	93–62
156	September 25	Nationals	3–7	B. Perez (2–0)	**Glavine** (14–7)	—	**Shea Stadium**	34,027	93–63
157	September 26	@ Braves	0–12	Smoltz (15–9)	**O. Perez** (3–13)	—	Turner Field	22,607	93–64
158	September 27	@ Braves	1–13	Hudson (13–12)	**Martinez** (9–8)	—	Turner Field	23,177	93–65
159	September 28	@ Braves	7–4	**Hernandez** (11–11)	Davies (3–7)	—	Turner Field	22,944	94–65
160	September 29	@ Nationals	4–3	**Feliciano** (7–2)	Rauch (4–5)	**Wagner** (40)	RFK Stadium	27,805	95–65
161	September 30	@ Nationals	13–0	**Glavine** (15–7)	B. Perez (2–1)	—	RFK Stadium	30,449	96–65

October: (1–0) Home: 0–0; Away: 1–0

#	Date	Opponent	Score	Win	Loss	Save	Location	Attendance	Record
162	October 1	@ Nationals	6–2	**Mota** (4–3)	Ortiz (11–16)	—	RFK Stadium	29,044	97–65

== Playoffs ==
=== Game log ===
2006 Postseason Game Log (6–4)
NL Division Series vs. Los Angeles Dodgers (3–0)

#	Date	Opponent	Score	Win	Loss	Save	Location	Attendance	Record
1	October 4	Dodgers	6–5	Mota (1–0)	Penny (0–1)	Wagner (1)	Shea Stadium	56,979	1–0
2	October 5	Dodgers	4–1	Glavine (1–0)	Kuo (0–1)	Wagner (2)	Shea Stadium	57,029	2–0
3	October 7	@ Dodgers	9–5	Feliciano (1–0)	Broxton (0–1)	—	Dodger Stadium	56,293	3–0

NL Championship Series vs. St. Louis Cardinals (3–4)

#	Date	Opponent	Score	Win	Loss	Save	Location	Attendance	Record
–	October 11	Cardinals	Postponed (rain); rescheduled for October 13						
1	October 12	Cardinals	2–0	Glavine (1–0)	Weaver (0–1)	Wagner (1)	Shea Stadium	56,311	1–0
2	October 13	Cardinals	6–9	Kinney (1–0)	Wagner (0–1)	—	Shea Stadium	56,349	1–1
3	October 14	@ Cardinals	0–5	Suppan (1–0)	Trachsel (0–1)	—	Busch Stadium	47,053	1–2
4	October 15	@ Cardinals	12–5	Perez (1–0)	Thompson (0–1)	—	Busch Stadium	46,600	2–2
–	October 16	@ Cardinals	Postponed (rain); rescheduled for October 17						
5	October 17	@ Cardinals	2–4	Weaver (1–1)	Glavine (1–1)	Wainwright (1)	Busch Stadium	46,496	2–3
6	October 18	Cardinals	4–2	Maine (1–0)	Carpenter (0–1)	—	Shea Stadium	56,334	3–3
7	October 19	Cardinals	1–3	Flores (1–0)	Heilman (0–1)	Wainwright (2)	Shea Stadium	56,357	3–4

== Player stats ==
=== Batting ===
==== Starters by position ====
Note: Pos = Position; G = Games played; AB = At bats; H = Hits; Avg. = Batting average; HR = Home runs; RBI = Runs batted in

Pos	Player	G	AB	H	Avg.	HR	RBI
C	Paul Lo Duca	124	512	163	.318	5	49
1B	Carlos Delgado	144	524	139	.265	38	114
2B	José Valentín	137	384	104	.271	18	62
3B	David Wright	154	582	181	.311	26	116
SS	José Reyes	153	647	194	.300	19	81
LF	Cliff Floyd	97	332	81	.244	11	44
CF	Carlos Beltrán	140	510	140	.275	41	116
RF	Xavier Nady	75	265	70	.264	14	40

==== Other batters ====
Note: G = Games played; AB = At bats; H = Hits; Avg. = Batting average; HR = Home runs; RBI = Runs batted in

Player	G	AB	H	Avg.	HR	RBI
Endy Chávez	133	353	108	.306	4	42
Chris Woodward	83	222	48	.216	3	25
Lastings Milledge	56	166	40	.241	4	22
Julio Franco	95	165	45	.273	2	26
Kazuo Matsui	38	130	26	.200	1	7
Ramón Castro	40	126	30	.238	4	12
Shawn Green	34	113	29	.257	4	15
Anderson Hernández	25	66	10	.152	1	3
Michael Tucker	35	56	11	.196	1	6
Eli Marrero	25	33	6	.182	2	5
Ricky Ledée	27	32	3	.094	1	1
Mike Difelice	15	25	2	.080	0	1
Kelly Stinnett	7	12	1	.083	0	0
Víctor Díaz	6	11	2	.182	0	2

=== Pitching ===
==== Starting pitchers ====
Note: G = Games pitched; IP = Innings pitched; W = Wins; L = Losses; ERA = Earned run average; SO = Strikeouts

Player	G	IP	W	L	ERA	SO
Tom Glavine	32	180	15	7	3.82	131
Steve Trachsel	30	164 2/3	15	8	4.97	79
Pedro Martínez	23	132 2/3	9	8	4.48	137
Orlando Hernández	20	116 2/3	9	7	4.09	112
Óliver Pérez	22	112 2/3	3	13	6.55	102
John Maine	16	90	6	5	3.60	71
Alay Soler	8	45	2	3	6.00	23
Víctor Zambrano	5	21 1/3	1	2	6.75	15
Mike Pelfrey	4	21 1/3	2	1	5.48	13
José Lima	4	17 1/3	0	4	9.87	12
Geremi González	3	14	0	0	7.71	8

==== Other pitchers ====
Note: G = Games pitched; IP = Innings pitched; W = Wins; L = Losses; ERA = Earned run average; SO = Strikeouts

Player	G	IP	W	L	ERA	SO
Brian Bannister	8	38	2	1	4.26	19
Dave Williams	6	29	3	1	5.59	16

==== Relief pitchers ====
Note: G = Games pitched; W = Wins; L = Losses; SV = Saves; ERA = Earned run average; SO = Strikeouts

Player	G	W	L	SV	ERA	SO
Billy Wagner	70	3	2	40	2.24	94
Aaron Heilman	74	4	5	0	3.62	73
Pedro Feliciano	64	7	2	0	2.09	54
Duaner Sánchez	49	5	1	0	2.60	44
Darren Oliver	45	4	1	0	3.44	60
Heath Bell	22	0	0	0	5.11	35
Roberto Hernández	22	0	0	0	3.48	15
Jorge Julio	18	1	2	1	5.06	33
Guillermo Mota	18	3	0	0	1.00	19
Royce Ring	11	0	0	0	2.13	8
Henry Owens	3	0	0	0	9.00	2
Bartolomé Fortunato	2	1	0	0	27.00	0
Philip Humber	2	0	0	0	0.00	2

== Awards and honors ==
- Carlos Delgado, Roberto Clemente Award

== Farm system ==
Level	Team	League	Manager
AAA	Norfolk Tides	International League	Ken Oberkfell
AA	Binghamton Mets	Eastern League	Juan Samuel
A	St. Lucie Mets	Florida State League	Gary Carter
A	Hagerstown Suns	South Atlantic League	Frank Cacciatore
A-Short Season	Brooklyn Cyclones	New York–Penn League	George Greer
Rookie	Kingsport Mets	Appalachian League	Donovan Mitchell
Rookie	GCL Mets	Gulf Coast League	Bobby Floyd

LEAGUE CHAMPIONS: St. Lucie
