= Hitting streak =

Number of consecutive games a baseball player gets at least one base hit

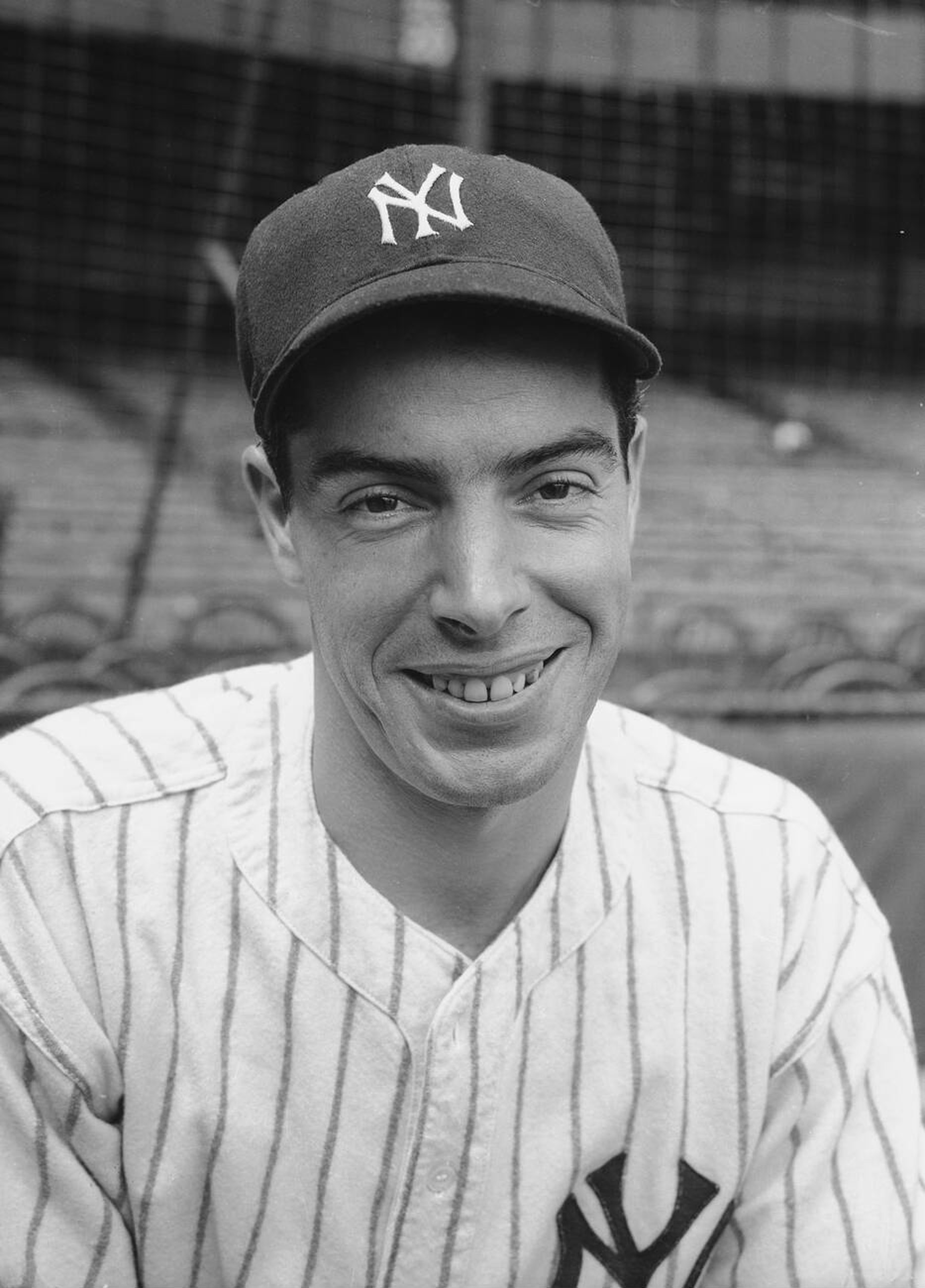
Joe DiMaggio's 56-game hitting streak in 1941 is the longest in Major League Baseball history.

In baseball, a hitting streak is the number of consecutive official games in which a player appears and gets at least one base hit. According to the Official Baseball Rules, such a streak is not necessarily ended when a player has at least 1 plate appearance and no hits. A streak shall not be terminated if all official plate appearances result in a base on balls, hit by pitch, defensive interference or a sacrifice bunt. The streak shall terminate if the player has a sacrifice fly and no hit.

Joe DiMaggio holds the Major League Baseball record with a streak of 56 consecutive games in 1941 which began on May 15 and ended July 17. DiMaggio hit .408 during his streak (91-for-223), with 15 home runs and 55 runs batted in.

Ketel Marte of the Arizona Diamondbacks holds the Major League Baseball postseason record with a streak of 20 consecutive games, with the streak beginning in his first playoff game appearance. The streak began in 2017 on October 14 and was broken up in Game 5 of the 2023 World Series on November 1st, striking out as the final batter for Arizona as the Texas Rangers won the series. Marte hit .352 during his streak (31-for-88), with 3 home runs and 13 runs batted in.

== Major League Baseball ==
=== Regular season leaders ===
There have been 57 occurrences in Major League Baseball where a player had a hitting streak of at least 30 games. Multiple streaks in the same season have occurred in 1922 (George Sisler and Rogers Hornsby), 1987 (Paul Molitor and Benito Santiago), 1997 (Nomar Garciaparra and Sandy Alomar Jr.), 1999 (Vladimir Guerrero and Luis Gonzalez), 2006 (Chase Utley and Willy Taveras), and 2011 (Andre Ethier and Dan Uggla). In addition, 1924 included one whole streak (Sam Rice) and the beginning of another (George Sisler). A similar event occurred in 2006 with two whole streaks (Utley and Taveras) and the end of another (Jimmy Rollins).

#	Player	Team	Games	Year(s)
1	Joe DiMaggio	New York Yankees	56	1941
2	Willie Keeler	Baltimore Orioles	45 (44)	1896–97
3	Pete Rose	Cincinnati Reds	44	1978
4	Bill Dahlen	Chicago Colts	42	1894
5	George Sisler	St. Louis Browns	41	1922
6	Ty Cobb	Detroit Tigers	40	1911
7	Paul Molitor	Milwaukee Brewers	39	1987
8	Jimmy Rollins	Philadelphia Phillies	38 (36)	2005–06
9	Tommy Holmes	Boston Braves	37	1945
10	Gene DeMontreville	Washington Senators	36	1896–97
11	Fred Clarke	Louisville Colonels	35	1895
	Ty Cobb	Detroit Tigers	35	1917
	George Sisler	St. Louis Browns	35 (34)	1924–25
	Luis Castillo	Florida Marlins	35	2002
	Chase Utley	Philadelphia Phillies	35	2006
16	George McQuinn	St. Louis Browns	34	1938
	Dom DiMaggio	Boston Red Sox	34	1949
	Benito Santiago	San Diego Padres	34	1987
19	George Davis	New York Giants	33	1893
	Hal Chase	New York Highlanders	33	1907
	Rogers Hornsby	St. Louis Cardinals	33	1922
	Heinie Manush	Washington Senators	33	1933
	Dan Uggla	Atlanta Braves	33	2011
24	Harry Heilmann	Detroit Tigers	32	1922–23
	Hal Morris	Cincinnati Reds	32	1996–97
26	Jimmy Wolf	Louisville Colonels	31	1885–86
	Ed Delahanty	Philadelphia Phillies	31	1899
	Nap Lajoie	Cleveland Naps	31	1906
	Sam Rice	Washington Senators	31	1924
	Vada Pinson	Cincinnati Reds	31	1965–66
	Willie Davis	Los Angeles Dodgers	31	1969
	Rico Carty	Atlanta Braves	31	1970
	Ron LeFlore	Detroit Tigers	31 (30)	1975–76
	Ken Landreaux	Minnesota Twins	31	1980
	Vladimir Guerrero	Montreal Expos	31	1999
	Whit Merrifield	Kansas City Royals	31 (11)	2018–19
37	Cal McVey	Chicago White Stockings	30	1876
	Dusty Miller	Cincinnati Reds	30	1895–96
	Elmer Smith	Cincinnati Reds	30	1898
	Tris Speaker	Boston Red Sox	30	1912
	Charlie Grimm	Pittsburgh Pirates	30	1922–23
	Lance Richbourg	Boston Braves	30	1927–28
	Sam Rice	Washington Senators	30	1929–30
	Goose Goslin	Detroit Tigers	30	1934
	Stan Musial	St. Louis Cardinals	30	1950
	George Brett	Kansas City Royals	30	1980
	Jerome Walton	Chicago Cubs	30	1989
	Sandy Alomar Jr.	Cleveland Indians	30	1997
	Nomar Garciaparra	Boston Red Sox	30	1997
	Eric Davis	Baltimore Orioles	30	1998
	Luis Gonzalez	Arizona Diamondbacks	30	1999
	Albert Pujols	St. Louis Cardinals	30	2003
	Willy Taveras	Houston Astros	30	2006
	Moisés Alou	New York Mets	30	2007
	Ryan Zimmerman	Washington Nationals	30	2009
	Andre Ethier	Los Angeles Dodgers	30	2011
	Freddie Freeman	Atlanta Braves	30	2016

Keeler's streak started in his final game of the 1896 season, and continued through the first 44 games of the 1897 season. Rollins ended the 2005 season with a 36-game streak and extended it through the first two games of the 2006 season. Sisler had a hit in the last game of 1924 and the first 34 games of 1925. Major League Baseball recognizes two hitting streak records: Longest hitting streak in one season, and longest hitting streak over multiple seasons (e.g. Rollins 2005–2006). Keeler's, Sisler's, and Rollins' streaks are listed as 44, 34, and 36 games when discussing single-season streaks, and 45, 35, and 38 games when discussing multiple-season streaks.

This list omits Denny Lyons of the 1887 American Association Philadelphia Athletics, who had a 52-game hitting streak. In 1887, the major leagues adopted a new rule which counted walks as hits, a rule which was dropped after that season. Lyons hit in 52 consecutive games that season, but his streak included two games (#22 and #44) in which his only "hits" were walks. In 1968, MLB ruled that walks in 1887 would not be counted as hits, so Lyons' streak was no longer recognized, though it still appears on some lists. In 2000 Major League Baseball reversed its 1968 decision, ruling that the statistics which were recognized in each year's official records should stand, even in cases where they were later proven incorrect. Paradoxically, the ruling affects only hit totals for the year; the batting champion for the year is not recognized as the all-time leader despite having the highest single-season average under the ruling, and Lyons' hitting streak is not recognized.

Ty Cobb, Sam Rice, and George Sisler are the only players with multiple streaks of 30 games or longer.

There have been 129 single-season streaks of 25 games or more. The lowest batting average ever recorded during a hitting streak of 25 games or more was .304 by Bruce Campbell in 1938. The highest was .486 during Chuck Klein's streak in 1930. Joe DiMaggio hit .408 during his record-holding 56-game streak. In probability theory, every baseball game is a Bernoulli trial in which a hitter either does or does not get a hit. DiMaggio's streak of 56 consecutive games with hits awaits an equal streak: "The probability is .0003 that a .350 hitter will have a hitting streak of at least 56 games in a season. If there are about four such seasons per year in the future, such a streak would be expected, assuming the Bernoulli trials model, every 1/(.0003 x 4) = 833 years."

=== Postseason leaders ===
==== Key ====
*	Active Hitting Streak
†	Active Player during 2023 MLB Season
‡	Member of Baseball Hall of Fame

#	Player	Team	Games	Year(s)
1	Ketel Marte†	Arizona Diamondbacks	20	2017–2023
2	Hank Bauer	New York Yankees	17	1956–1958
	Derek Jeter‡	New York Yankees	17	2003–2004
	Manny Ramirez	Boston Red Sox	17	2003–2004
5	Pat Borders	Toronto Blue Jays	16	1991–1993
	Michael Brantley†	Houston Astros	16	2020–2021
7	Alcides Escobar	Kansas City Royals	15	2015
	Marquis Grissom	Atlanta Braves	15	1995–1996
	Rickey Henderson‡	Oakland Athletics	15	1989–1990
10	Roberto Clemente‡	Pittsburgh Pirates	14	1960, 1971

=== Major League Baseball records by franchise ===
Only currently extant franchises are included on this list. Where a player had a significant streak while the team was in other than its current city, the records in these other cities are displayed. As above, for a multi-year streak, the single-season streak is shown in parentheses.

Team	Player	Games	Year(s)
Arizona Diamondbacks	Luis Gonzalez	30	1999
Atlanta Braves	Tommy Holmes (Boston Braves)	37	1945
	Dan Uggla (Atlanta Braves)	33	2011
	Hank Aaron (Milwaukee Braves)	25	1956
Baltimore Orioles	George Sisler (St. Louis Browns)	41	1922
	Eric Davis (Baltimore Orioles)	30	1998
Boston Red Sox	Dom DiMaggio	34	1949
Chicago Cubs	Bill Dahlen (Chicago Colts)	42	1894
Chicago White Sox	Carlos Lee	28	2004
Cincinnati Reds	Pete Rose	44	1978
Cleveland Guardians	Napoleon Lajoie (Cleveland Naps)	31	1906
Colorado Rockies	Nolan Arenado	28	2014
Detroit Tigers	Ty Cobb	40	1911
Houston Astros	Willy Taveras	30	2006
Kansas City Royals	Whit Merrifield	31	2018–19
Los Angeles Angels	Garret Anderson	28	1998
Los Angeles Dodgers	Willie Davis (Los Angeles Dodgers)	31	1969
	Zack Wheat (Brooklyn Dodgers)	29	1916
Miami Marlins	Luis Castillo (Florida Marlins)	35	2002
Milwaukee Brewers	Paul Molitor (Milwaukee Brewers)	39	1987
	Tommy Davis (Seattle Pilots)	18	1969
Minnesota Twins	Heinie Manush (Washington Senators)	33	1933
	Ken Landreaux (Minnesota Twins)	31	1980
New York Mets	Moisés Alou	30	2007
New York Yankees	Joe DiMaggio	56	1941
Oakland Athletics	Bill Lamar (Philadelphia Athletics)	29	1925
	Jason Giambi (Oakland Athletics)	25	1997
	Héctor López (Kansas City Athletics)	22	1957
	Vic Power (Kansas City Athletics)	22	1958
Philadelphia Phillies	Jimmy Rollins	38 (36)	2005–06
Pittsburgh Pirates	Jimmy Williams	27	1899
San Diego Padres	Benito Santiago	34	1987
San Francisco Giants	George Davis (New York Giants)	33	1893
	Jack Clark (San Francisco Giants)	26	1978
Seattle Mariners	Ichiro Suzuki	27	2009
St. Louis Cardinals	Rogers Hornsby	33	1922
Tampa Bay Rays	Yandy Díaz	20	2024
Texas Rangers	Gabe Kapler (Texas Rangers)	28	2000
	Ken McMullen (Washington Senators)	19	1967
Toronto Blue Jays	Shawn Green	28	1999
Washington Nationals	Vladimir Guerrero (Montreal Expos)	31	1999
	Ryan Zimmerman (Washington Nationals)	30	2009

== Minor League Baseball leaders ==
The longest streaks in the history of Minor League Baseball and other professional baseball leagues:

Rank	Player	League	Games	Year(s)
1	Joe Wilhoit	Western League	69	1919
2	Joe DiMaggio	Pacific Coast League	61	1933
3	Román Mejías	Big State League	55	1954
4	Rasty Wright (outfielder)	Western League (1885-1899)	51	1894-95
5	Otto Pahlman	Illinois–Indiana–Iowa League	50	1922
	Francisco Mejia	Carolina League	50	2016
7	Jack Ness	Pacific Coast League	49	1915
	Harry Chozen	Southern League	49	1945
9	Johnny Bates	Southern League	46	1925
	James McOwen	California League	45	2009
11	Brandon Watson	International League	43	2007
	Doc Marshall	American Association	43	1935
	Orlando Moreno	Longhorn League	43	1947
	Howie Bedell	American Association	43	1961
15	Herbert Chapman	Southeastern League	42	1950
	Jack Lelivelt	International League	42	1912
17	Jim Ogelsby	Pacific Coast League	41	1933
	Randy César	Texas League	41	2018
19	Jason James	Frontier League	40	2009
	Frosty Kennedy	West Texas–New Mexico League	40	1953
21	Jose Siri	Midwest League	39	2017
22	Mitch Hilligoss	South Atlantic League	38	2007
	Hubert Mason	Eastern League	38	1925
	Paul Owens	PONY League	38	1951
25	Maikel Jova	North American League	37	2012
	Johnny Rizzo	American Association	37	1937
	Joey Cora	Pacific Coast League	37	1989
	Bobby Treviño	Texas League	37	1969
	Harold Garcia	Florida State League	37	2010
30	Bill Sweeney	International League	36	1935
	Joe Altobelli	Florida State League	36	1951
32	Brent Gates	California League	35	1992
	Scott Seabol	South Atlantic League	35	1999
	Kevin Holt	Frontier League	35	1996–97
	Ildemaro Vargas	Pacific Coast League	35	2018
36	Greg Tubbs	Southern League	33	1987
	Mat Gamel	Florida State League	33	2007
38	Chris Valaika	Pioneer League	32	2006
	Robert Fick	Midwest League	32	1997
	Lance Downing	Arizona League	32	1997
	Jim Reboulet	Eastern League	32	1986
42	Kevin Hooper	Pacific Coast League	31	2002
	Casey Blake	Florida State League	31	1998
	Jeremy Carr	Texas League	31	1997
	Pedro Guerrero	Pacific Coast League	31	1979
46	Desi Wilson	Golden Baseball League	30	2005
	Mike Galloway	Frontier League	30	2005
	Ricardo Nanita	Pioneer League	30	2003
	Michael Robertson	Frontier League	30	2001
	Doug Brady	American Association	30	1995
	Jose Tolentino	Pacific Coast League	30	1990

DiMaggio set the Minor League record as a member of the San Francisco Seals. Unrecognized by Minor League Baseball is the 69 game hitting streak by Joe Wilhoit in 1919. Wilhoit was in the independent Western League at the time and his record is considered the all-time Professional Baseball record.

== See also ==
- Scoreless innings streak
- List of Major League Baseball individual streaks
