= Melvin Dorta =

Venezuelan baseball player (born 1982)

- Infielder
- Born: January 15, 1982 (age 44); Valencia, Venezuela
- Batted: Right Threw: Right

MLB debut
- Sept 1, 2006, for the Washington Nationals

Last MLB appearance
- October 1, 2006, for the Washington Nationals

MLB statistics
- Batting average: .211
- Hits: 4
- Runs batted in: 0
- Stats at Baseball Reference

Teams
- Washington Nationals (2006)

Melvin A. Dorta (born January 15, 1982) is a Venezuelan former professional baseball infielder. Dorta bats and throws right-handed. He made his Major League Baseball debut with the Washington Nationals on September 1, 2006.

== Career ==
=== Boston Red Sox ===
Dorta began his career by joining the Boston Red Sox organization in 2001 after signing as a free agent in 1998. He was assigned to the GCL Red Sox and also appeared for the Augusta GreenJackets. In 2002, he played for the advanced A-ball Sarasota Red Sox, with whom he spent the entire 2002 and 2003 seasons.

=== Montreal Expos/Washington Nationals ===
Dorta was acquired by the Montreal Expos from the Boston Red Sox on January 5, 2004. In 2004 he played for the AA Harrisburg Senators and remained in Harrisburg in 2005 when the Montreal Expos became the Washington Nationals. In 2005, Dorta established career highs with 11 home runs, 50 RBI and 121 games played for Double-A Harrisburg Senators. In 2006, he was selected for the Eastern League All-Star Game and was promoted to Washington in July for two games, then was brought back up at the start of September. In 2007, Dorta did not appear in the major leagues, and played for Harrisburg and the AAA Columbus Clippers. He became a free agent after the season.

=== Pittsburgh Pirates ===
On January 22, 2008, Dorta signed a minor league contract with an invitation to spring training with the Pittsburgh Pirates. He spent the season with the Altoona Curve, the Double-A affiliate of Pittsburgh. He became a free agent at the end of the season.

=== Baltimore Orioles ===
Dorta signed a minor league contract with the Baltimore Orioles in December 2008. Dorta was assigned to the Double-A Bowie Baysox to begin the season. On May 16, he was promoted to the Triple-A Norfolk Tides. He would play in 94 games for Norfolk, hitting .252/.301/.321. On November 9, 2009, he elected free agency.

=== Philadelphia Phillies ===
On December 11, 2009, Dorta signed a minor league deal with the Philadelphia Phillies organization. He was assigned to the Double-A Reading Phillies to begin the season. On April 15, he was promoted to the Triple-A Lehigh Valley IronPigs. Dorta played in 103 games for the Phillies organization before he elected free agency on November 6, 2010.

=== Camden Riversharks ===
Dorta signed with the Camden Riversharks of the Atlantic League of Professional Baseball for the 2011 season and played in 8 games for Camden, hitting .097/.125/.129 before he was released.

=== Road Warriors ===
Shortly after his release, Dorta signed with the Road Warriors of the Atlantic League and played in 39 games for the club, batting .353/.373/.433 for the team. He became a free agent at the conclusion of the season.

=== Second Stint with Washington Nationals ===
On March 4, 2013, Dorta signed a minor league deal with the Washington Nationals organization. Instead of playing with the team, he became an assistant coach for the Harrisburg Senators that season, ending his playing career. He was released by the team before the start of the 2014 season.

== See also ==
- List of Major League Baseball players from Venezuela
