= Brandon Watson =

American baseball player (born 1981)

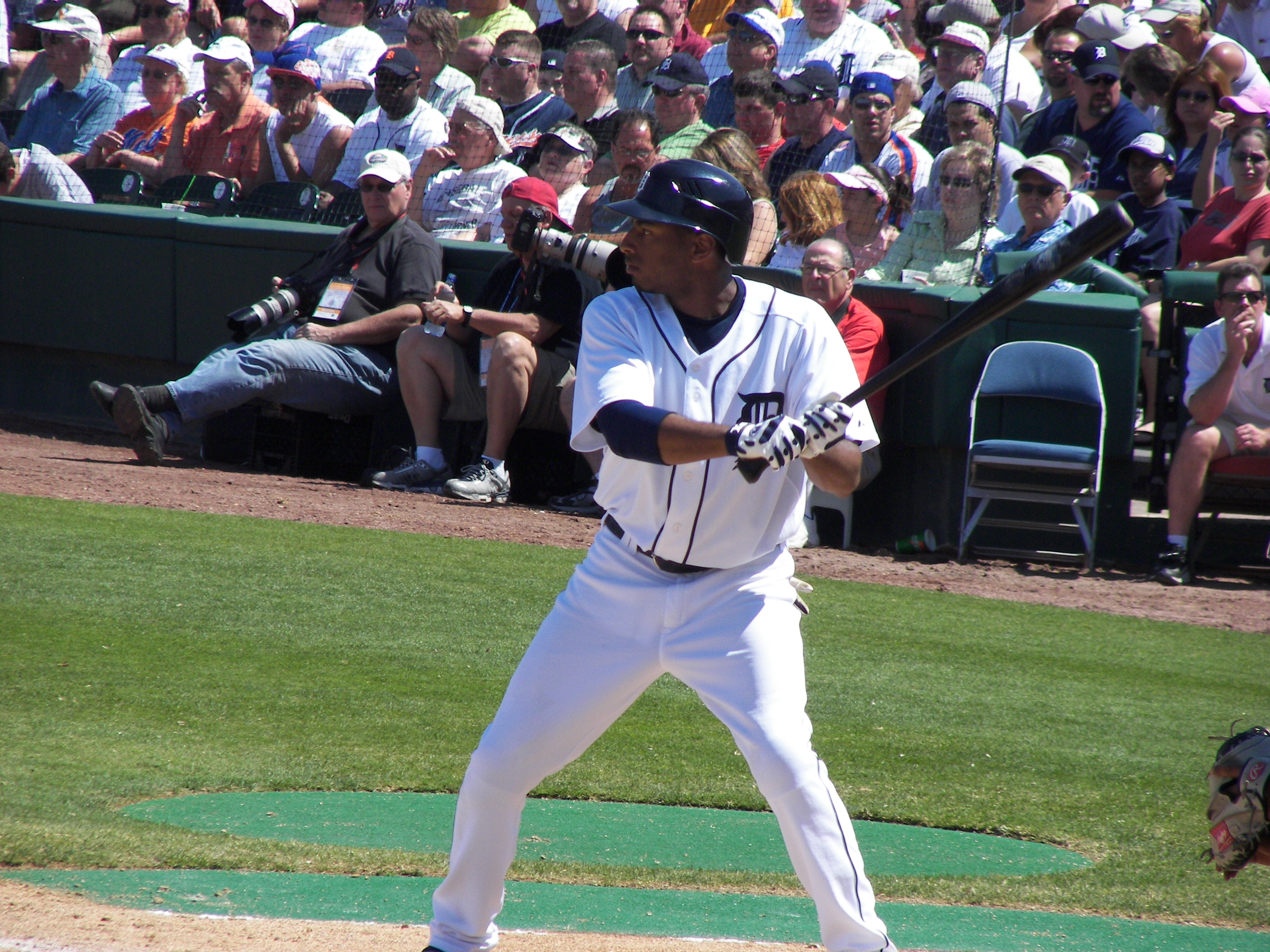
- Outfielder
- Born: September 30, 1981 (age 43); Los Angeles, California, U.S.
- Batted: Left Threw: Right

MLB debut
- August 9, 2005, for the Washington Nationals

Last MLB appearance
- June 25, 2007, for the Washington Nationals

Career statistics
- Batting average: .198
- Home runs: 1
- Runs batted in: 7
- Stats at Baseball Reference

Teams
- Washington Nationals (2005–2006); Cincinnati Reds (2006); Washington Nationals (2007)

Brandon Eric Watson (born September 30, 1981) is an American former professional baseball outfielder. Although he bats left-handed, Watson throws right-handed.

Watson spent a portion of the 2005 and the 2006 with the Washington Nationals. In addition, in 2006, Watson appeared in one game as a member of the Cincinnati Reds.

== Early life ==
The godson of Eric Davis, a former Major League Baseball player, Watson graduated from Westchester High School in 1999. While at Westchester, Watson was the Most Valuable Player for the school's baseball team. He also made the All-State first team and the All-City team.

== Professional career ==
In 2005, Watson played for the New Orleans Zephyrs, batting .355 and being selected as a Pacific League All-Star. In August, he was brought up for 10 days before being sent back to New Orleans, and then brought up again in September, amassing only 40 at bats. In 2006, Watson started in center field and batted lead-off for the Nationals on Opening-Day, but he was optioned to the minors after just nine games. He was batting .305 with the Zephyrs, when he suffered a shoulder separation which sidelined him for six weeks (May 27-July 12). Upon his return, he was claimed off waivers in July by the Cincinnati Reds, playing the rest of the season (except for one game with the Reds—on July 30 where he appeared as a pinch runner and stole a base) with their minor league affiliate, Louisville. At the end of the season, he became a free agent, and was signed to a minor league contract with the Detroit Tigers. In the spring of 2007, the Tigers released him, and the Nationals claimed him on April 9, sending him to the Nationals' new AAA affiliate, the Columbus Clippers.

With the Clippers, on Father's Day, June 17, Watson set a new International League record by hitting in 43 consecutive games, breaking a 95-year-old record (held by Jack Lelivelt, a member of the Rochester Hustlers). His streak ended the following day; one day after that, the Nationals called him up to the Major Leagues as a substitute for Robert Fick who went on bereavement leave, and on June 20, started for the first time since April 2006. Watson played five games, batted .278, and was optioned back to Triple-A to make room for Fick's return. Watson was the only Washington outfielder with options remaining, meaning other teams could not claim him if the Nationals sent him down to Triple-A.

In 2008, he played for the Philadelphia Phillies' Triple-A affiliate, the Lehigh Valley IronPigs. Watson played for the Reno Aces in 2009, in their inaugural year as the Triple-A affiliate of the Arizona Diamondbacks.

After signing a minor league contract with the Los Angeles Dodgers, Watson was released on March 31, 2010. He last played for the Newark Bears of the independent Canadian-American Association in 2011.
