= Santiago Ramírez (baseball) =

Dominican baseball player

- Relief pitcher
- Born: August 15, 1978 (age 47); Bonao, Dominican Republic
- Batted: Right Threw: Right

MLB debut
- May 24, 2006, for the Washington Nationals

Last MLB appearance
- May 29, 2006, for the Washington Nationals

MLB statistics
- Win–loss record: 0-0
- Earned run average: 8.10
- Strikeouts: 1
- Stats at Baseball Reference

Teams
- Washington Nationals (2006); Chunichi Dragons (2007)
Medals
Men's baseball
Representing Dominican Republic
Central American and Caribbean Games
Gold medal – first place	2010 Mayagüez	Team

Santiago Ramírez (born August 15, 1978) is a Dominican former professional baseball pitcher. He played part of one season in Major League Baseball for the Washington Nationals, appearing in four games. He also played in Nippon Professional Baseball for the Chunichi Dragons in 2007, appearing in 27 games.

== Career ==
Ramírez was signed as anamateur free agent by the Houston Astros in 1997. After spending the next two seasons playing baseball in the Dominican Republic, Ramírez made his minor league debut in 1999 with the Martinsville Astros, Houston's rookie-level minor league affiliate. He made 25 appearances as a relief pitcher for Martinsville, winning two games and losing one with a 1.45 earned run average (ERA) and 17 saves.

He became a free agent after the 2004 season, and spent one season in the Kansas City Royals organization before signing with the Nationals.

Ramírez was released by Washington on July 1, 2006 and joined the Chunichi Dragons in 2007. After spending the 2008 season in the Mexican League with the Sultanes de Monterrey, he played for the Worcester Tornadoes of the independent Can-Am League in 2009, his last professional season.
