= Jack Lelivelt =

American baseball player (1885–1941)

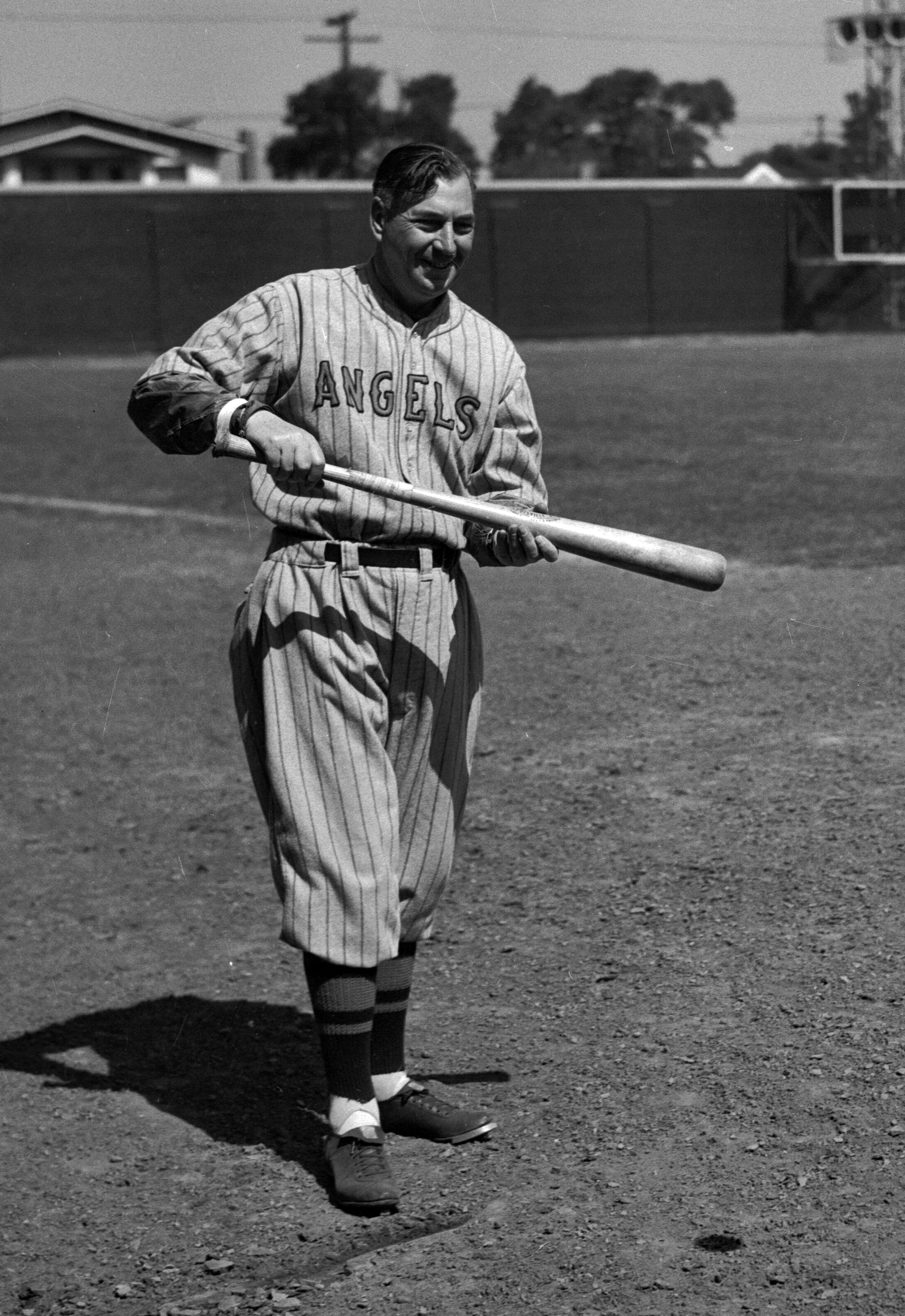
- Lelivelt with the Los Angeles Angels
- Outfielder
- Born: November 14, 1885; Amsterdam, Netherlands
- Died: January 20, 1941 (aged 55); Seattle, Washington, U.S.
- Batted: Left Threw: Left

MLB debut
- June 24, 1909, for the Washington Senators

Last MLB appearance
- June 13, 1914, for the Cleveland Naps

MLB statistics
- Batting average: .301
- Home runs: 2
- Runs batted in: 126
- Stats at Baseball Reference

Teams
- Washington Senators (1909–1911); New York Highlanders / Yankees (1912–1913); Cleveland Naps (1913–1914)

John Frank Lelivelt (November 14, 1885 – January 20, 1941) was an American professional baseball outfielder and manager who played in the major leagues for the Washington Senators, New York Highlanders / Yankees and Cleveland Naps. While playing in the minor leagues for the Rochester Hustlers, he set the International League record for the longest hitting streak with a 42-game hitting streak in 1912. The record was broken by Brandon Watson in 2007.

== Playing career ==
=== Early years ===
Lelivelt was born as Johannes Franciscus Lelivelt in Amsterdam, The Netherlands, on 14 November 1885. His father was Franciscus Zacharias Lelivelt (later Frank) from Groessen, his mother was Theodra Mattijssen (later Dora) from Renkum. They married in Amsterdam on 19 June 1884, and emigrated to the US in 1887. Lelivelt made his major league debut with the Washington Senators in 1909. He saw his most playing time during his years in Washington. However, his batting average would increase after he left the Senators.

=== Record hitting streak ===
Lelivelt started the 1912 season with the Rochester Hustlers. The Hustlers had won pennants each of the three previous years. After his record hitting streak, the first-place Hustlers sold Lelivelt and Tommy McMillen to the New York Highlanders. Lelivelt had a .351 batting average with 33 doubles for the Hustlers. The Toronto Maple Leafs passed the Hustlers in the standings. The city of Rochester would not have another International League champion until 1928. The record hitting streak was lost to history until the 2007 version of the International League Record Book recognized the hitting streak. Previous versions of the book would list the longest hitting streak as 36 games by Bill Sweeney in 1935.

=== Later years ===
Lelivelt played from 1912 until 1914 as a part-time player. Despite having a .301 career major league average, he never was a full-time player. In 1914, several Naps players split time between the Cleveland Naps and the American Association Cleveland Bearcats in an effort to prevent the Federal League from moving a team to Cleveland. Lelivelt was one of those players. He would play in the minor leagues until retiring as a player in 1925.

== Managerial career and death ==
Lelivelt became a player-manager for the Western League's Omaha franchise in 1920. From 1929 through 1937, he managed the Los Angeles Angels (PCL), including the 1934 team that won 137 out of 187 games (.733) and is hailed as one of the minor league's "greatest teams". When Emile Sick purchased the Seattle Rainiers, one of his first projects was bringing Lelivelt to Seattle. His Seattle Rainiers teams won Pacific Coast League titles in 1939 and 1940. Except for 1937, he managed every year until his death from a heart attack in January 1941 at the age of 55. He was interred in Glendale, California's Grand View Memorial Park Cemetery.

In 1943, Lelivelt was elected to the Pacific Coast League Hall of Fame.
