= Brett Campbell =

American baseball player (born 1981)

- Pitcher
- Born: October 17, 1981 (age 44); Atlanta, Georgia, U.S.
- Batted: Right Threw: Right

MLB debut
- September 7, 2006, for the Washington Nationals

Last MLB appearance
- September 18, 2006, for the Washington Nationals

MLB statistics
- Win–loss record: 0–0
- Earned run average: 10.38
- Strikeouts: 4
- Stats at Baseball Reference

Teams
- Washington Nationals (2006)

Richard Brett Campbell (born October 17, 1981) is an American former professional baseball pitcher. He played in Major League Baseball (MLB) for the Washington Nationals.

== Career ==
Campbell was drafted by the Montreal Expos in the 34th round of the 2004 amateur draft. He began the 2004 season playing for their rookie league affiliate, the GCL Expos. During the season, he was promoted to the Class A Vermont Expos and then to the Class A-Advanced Brevard County Manatees.

The Expos were relocated to Washington D.C. for the 2005 season, becoming the Washington Nationals. During the first year as a part of the new Nationals association, he played for the Class A Savannah Sand Gnats before being promoted to the A-Advanced Potomac Nationals. He started 2006 with the Potomac Nationals and was then promoted to the Double-A Harrisburg Senators and then the Triple-A New Orleans Zephyrs. He received a September call-up to the major league Nationals, making is big league debut on September 7, 2006. In 2007, he returned to Double-A Harrisburg.

After the 2007 season, he was selected by the Milwaukee Brewers in the rule 5 draft (triple-A phase), but was released before the start of the 2008 season.

Following his playing career, he became a scout in the Texas Rangers organization.

== See also ==
- Rule 5 draft results
