= Alay Soler =

Cuban baseball player (born 1979)

- Pitcher
- Born: October 9, 1979 (age 46); Pinar del Río, Cuba
- Batted: Right Threw: Right

MLB debut
- May 24, 2006, for the New York Mets

Last MLB appearance
- July 2, 2006, for the New York Mets

MLB statistics
- Win–loss record: 2–3
- Earned run average: 6.00
- Strikeouts: 23
- Stats at Baseball Reference

Teams
- New York Mets (2006)

Alain "Alay" Soler (born October 9, 1979) is a former baseball pitcher who played in Major League Baseball for the New York Mets in 2006.

== Career ==
=== Early career ===
Soler attended high school at Espa Armani Arenado and played baseball for four years. He graduated from Nancy Uranga University with a physical education degree.

Soler played baseball for his country in the World University Games in Cuba in 1998 and in Italy in 2002. He also participated in the World Youth Games in 1996 and was a teammate of José Contreras on Pinar del Río in the Cuban National Series. He later played as a member of the Cuban national team.

Soler defected from Cuba in November, 2003, receiving political asylum in the Dominican Republic. He pitched for Leones del Escogido in the Dominican Winter Baseball League in 2004, recording a 0–2 record and a 5.28 ERA in five games. In 15.1 innings, he allowed 14 hits, nine runs, with six walks and 23 strikeouts. He recorded 10 strikeouts and permitted one hit in five innings of work on October 26 against the Estrellas Orientales. Soler averaged 13.5 strikeouts per nine innings pitched.

=== New York Mets ===
In September, 2004, Soler signed a three-year, $2.8 million major league contract with the New York Mets. However, he was unable to obtain a visa for entry into the United States until November, 2005. He began his career as a Met with the Single-A St. Lucie Mets in April, 2006, but was quickly promoted to the Double-A Binghamton Mets in May.

Soler made his major league debut as a starter at Shea Stadium on May 24, 2006. He gave up two earned runs, five hits and four walks in six innings with no decision as the Mets defeated the Philadelphia Phillies 5–4. In Soler's fourth career start (June 10, 2006) he hurled his first complete game shutout, a two-hitter against the Arizona Diamondbacks. Through the first half of 2006, Soler posted a 2–3 record with a 6.00 ERA.

On July 3, 2006, Soler was sent back to the Triple-A Norfolk Tides after a poor performance the night before against the New York Yankees.

Soler was given his unconditional release by the Mets on March 12, 2007. He had pitched unimpressively during spring training.

=== Pittsburgh Pirates ===
On March 19, 2007, Soler signed with the Pittsburgh Pirates. At the beginning of the season, Soler was assigned to the Pirates' Double-A affiliate, the Altoona Curve. He went 1–1 with a 6.00 ERA in 14 appearances before being released on June 28.

=== Long Island Ducks ===
On April 19, 2008, Soler signed a one-year, $400,000 contract with the Houston Astros, but was later released prior to appearing for the organization. Soler then pitched for the Long Island Ducks of the Atlantic League of Professional Baseball. He announced his retirement from professional baseball on September 12.

=== Newark Bears ===
However, in 2009 Soler would come out of retirement pitch in seven games for the Newark Bears of the Atlantic League of Professional Baseball.

== See also ==
- List of baseball players who defected from Cuba
