= Beltrán Pérez =

Dominican baseball player (born 1981)

- Pitcher
- Born: October 24, 1981 (age 44); San Francisco de Macoris, Dominican Republic
- Batted: Right Threw: Right

MLB debut
- September 2, 2006, for the Washington Nationals

Last MLB appearance
- September 30, 2006, for the Washington Nationals

MLB statistics
- Win–loss record: 2–1
- Earned run average: 3.86
- Strikeouts: 9
- Stats at Baseball Reference

Teams
- Washington Nationals (2006)

Beltrán Ogilbio Pérez (born October 24, 1981) is a Dominican former Major League Baseball (MLB) pitcher.

== Career ==
Originally signed as an undrafted free agent by the Arizona Diamondbacks in 1999, he was traded in 2005 to the Los Angeles Dodgers with Dioner Navarro for Shawn Green. In 2006, he signed as a free agent with the Washington Nationals.

After pitching for the Harrisburg Senators, the Nationals' Double-A affiliate in the Eastern League, Pérez made his major league debut on September 2, 2006, as a relief pitcher. However, he made his final three appearances of 2006 as a starting pitcher.

In 2007, Pérez again pitched for Harrisburg and also for the Columbus Clippers, Washington's Triple-A affiliate in the International League. He logged 124 innings in 20 starts and two relief appearances, winning 7, losing 7, and recording a 4.57 ERA. In 2008, Pérez once again pitched for Harrisburg, going 3–5 with a 6.41 ERA.
