= Pedro Feliciano =

Puerto Rican baseball player (1976–2021)

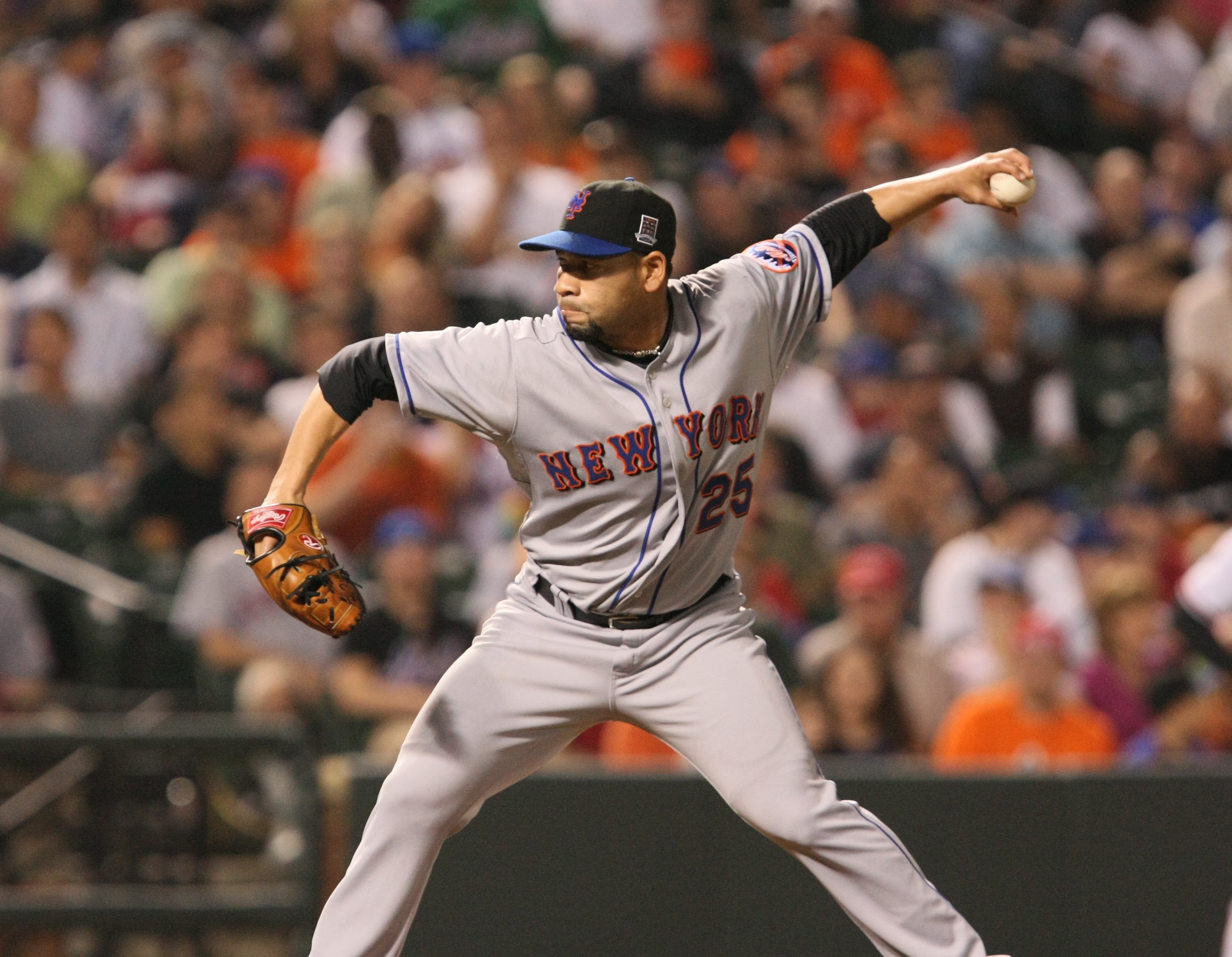
- Feliciano with the New York Mets in 2009
- Relief pitcher
- Born: August 25, 1976; Río Piedras, Puerto Rico
- Died: November 8, 2021 (aged 45); Vega Alta, Puerto Rico
- Batted: Left Threw: Left

Professional debut
- MLB: September 4, 2002, for the New York Mets
- NPB: April 17, 2005, for the Fukuoka Daiei Hawks

Last appearance
- NPB: September 21, 2005, for the Fukuoka Daiei Hawks
- MLB: September 28, 2013, for the New York Mets

MLB statistics
- Win–loss record: 22–21
- Earned run average: 3.33
- Strikeouts: 350

NPB statistics
- Win–loss record: 3–2
- Earned run average: 3.89
- Strikeouts: 36
- Stats at Baseball Reference

Teams
- New York Mets (2002–2004); Fukuoka Daiei Hawks (2005); New York Mets (2006–2010, 2013)

Pedro Juan Feliciano Molina (August 25, 1976 – November 8, 2021) was a Puerto Rican baseball pitcher who played nine seasons in Major League Baseball (MLB). Nicknamed "Perpetual Pedro", he played for the New York Mets from 2002 to 2004, from 2006 to 2010, and in 2013, as well as in Nippon Professional Baseball for the Fukuoka Daiei Hawks in 2005.

== Early life ==
Feliciano was born in Río Piedras, Puerto Rico, on August 25, 1976. He graduated from Jose S. Algeria High School in Dorado, Puerto Rico. He was selected by the Los Angeles Dodgers in the 31st round of the 1995 Major League Baseball draft.

== Professional career ==
=== Early career ===
Feliciano played seven seasons in the minor leagues from 1995 to 2002. He began his professional career with the Great Falls Dodgers in the Pioneer League. After four years in the Rookie and Class A leagues, he suffered a shoulder injury in 1999 which prevented him from playing all season. He returned in 2000, pitching at the AA level, with one inning for the AAA Albuquerque Dukes. In 2001, he struggled in AAA after pitching well in AA. After six years of service in the minor leagues without promotion to the Majors, he became a free agent.

=== Cincinnati Reds, New York Mets, Detroit Tigers (2002) ===
Feliciano signed with the Cincinnati Reds for the 2002 season, but was traded to the New York Mets in August along with Brady Clark for Shawn Estes. He made his MLB debut on September 4, 2002, pitching two scoreless innings of relief without giving up a hit and striking out two in an 11–3 win over the Florida Marlins. The Mets designated Feliciano for assignment to make room on their 40-man roster following the conclusion of the 2002 season, and he was claimed off waivers by the Detroit Tigers on October 11. Two months later on December 16, the Tigers released Feliciano.

=== Second stint with New York Mets (2003–2004) ===
The Mets re-signed Feliciano to a minor league contract on April 3, 2003. Over the course of the next two seasons, he had mixed success with the Mets, being recalled from and optioned to the Triple-A Norfolk Tides several times in 2003 and 2004.

=== Fukuoka SoftBank Hawks (2005) ===
The Mets sold Feliciano's contract to the Fukuoka SoftBank Hawks of the Japanese Pacific League on January 24, 2005. He spent the entire season with the Hawks, compiling a 3–2 win–loss record, a 3.89 earned run average (ERA), and 36 strikeouts over 37 innings pitched.

=== Third stint with the New York Mets (2006–2010) ===
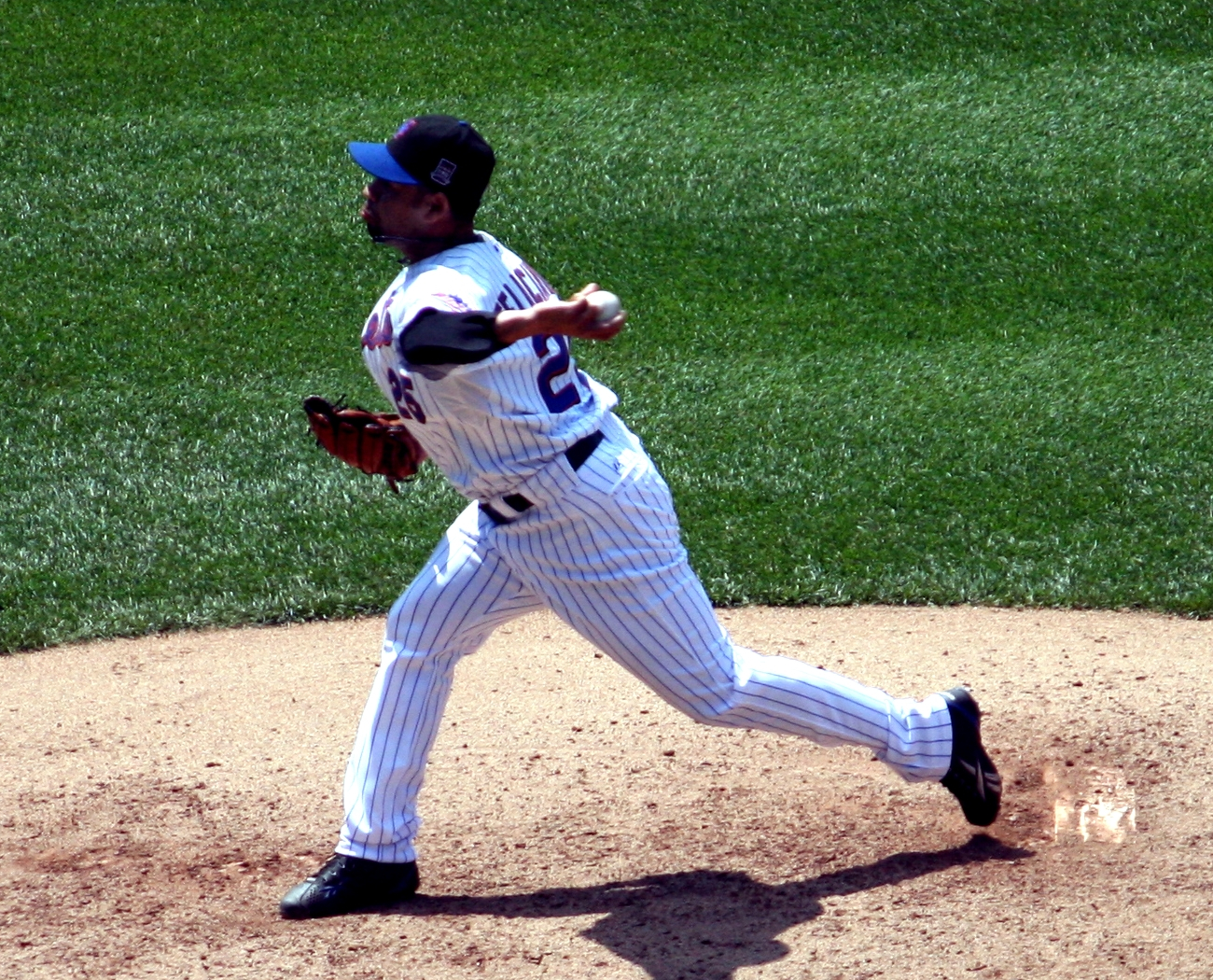
Feliciano with the Mets in 2009.

Feliciano began his third stint with the Mets when he was re-signed on February 28, 2006, a couple of weeks after the beginning of spring training. He initially started the season with the Norfolk Tides to make up for the time he had missed in spring training, but he was recalled on April 17 and became a permanent fixture in the Mets bullpen as a left-handed specialist. He recorded his first major league save against the Philadelphia Phillies on June 30, 2007. He operated in the bullpen as the Mets' primary situational left-hander in 2008 and 2009.

Feliciano led the league in games pitched from 2008 to 2010. In 58 of those games in 2008, the greatest number in the majors, he recorded fewer than three outs. He also led MLB that year in days pitched on zero days rest (36). His 92 appearances in 2010 was the fourth-most in major league history. In that same year, he passed Tom Seaver in games pitched for the Mets with 459. He ultimately made 344 relief appearances from 2007 to 2010, the most in major league history over four consecutive seasons. At the time of his death, Feliciano's 484 games pitched for the franchise was second all-time to John Franco (695).

=== New York Yankees (2011–2012) ===
On January 3, 2011, Feliciano signed a two-year deal worth approximately $8 million with the New York Yankees. Early in the 2011 season, Feliciano began to experience soreness in his left shoulder and was placed on the disabled list. In April, orthopedist James Andrews recommended a six-week strengthening program for Feliciano. The Yankees front office stated that the reason behind Feliciano's injury was that the Mets had overused him in the previous few years. It was eventually revealed that Feliciano had a torn anterior capsule and rotator cuff in his left shoulder, which required surgery, and ended his 2011 season.

Feliciano began the 2012 season on the 60-day disabled list in an effort to continue recovering from his shoulder surgery from the previous year. Late in the 2012 season between August and September, Feliciano was issued to rehab at the Double-A Trenton Thunder. Feliciano ultimately failed to make an appearance with the Yankees for the entire 2012 year. After the season, his contract expired, and he left the Yankees without throwing a single pitch for the team.

=== Fourth stint with the New York Mets (2013) ===
On January 21, 2013, Feliciano signed a minor league deal with the New York Mets. He eventually made his first appearance of the season on August 2 with the Mets against the Kansas City Royals and induced a ground out from Alex Gordon in the top of the 9th inning.

=== Cubs and Cardinals (2014–2015) ===
On May 25, 2014, Feliciano signed a minor league contract with the St. Louis Cardinals. He later signed a minor league contract with the Chicago Cubs on February 4 the following year.

== Personal life ==
Feliciano was married to Wanda. Together, they had two children.

Feliciano was diagnosed with left ventricular noncompaction, a rare genetic heart condition, in 2013 and wore a heart monitor that year. He died on November 8, 2021, at his home in Puerto Rico. He was 45 years old.
