= Michael O'Connor (baseball) =

American baseball player (born 1980)

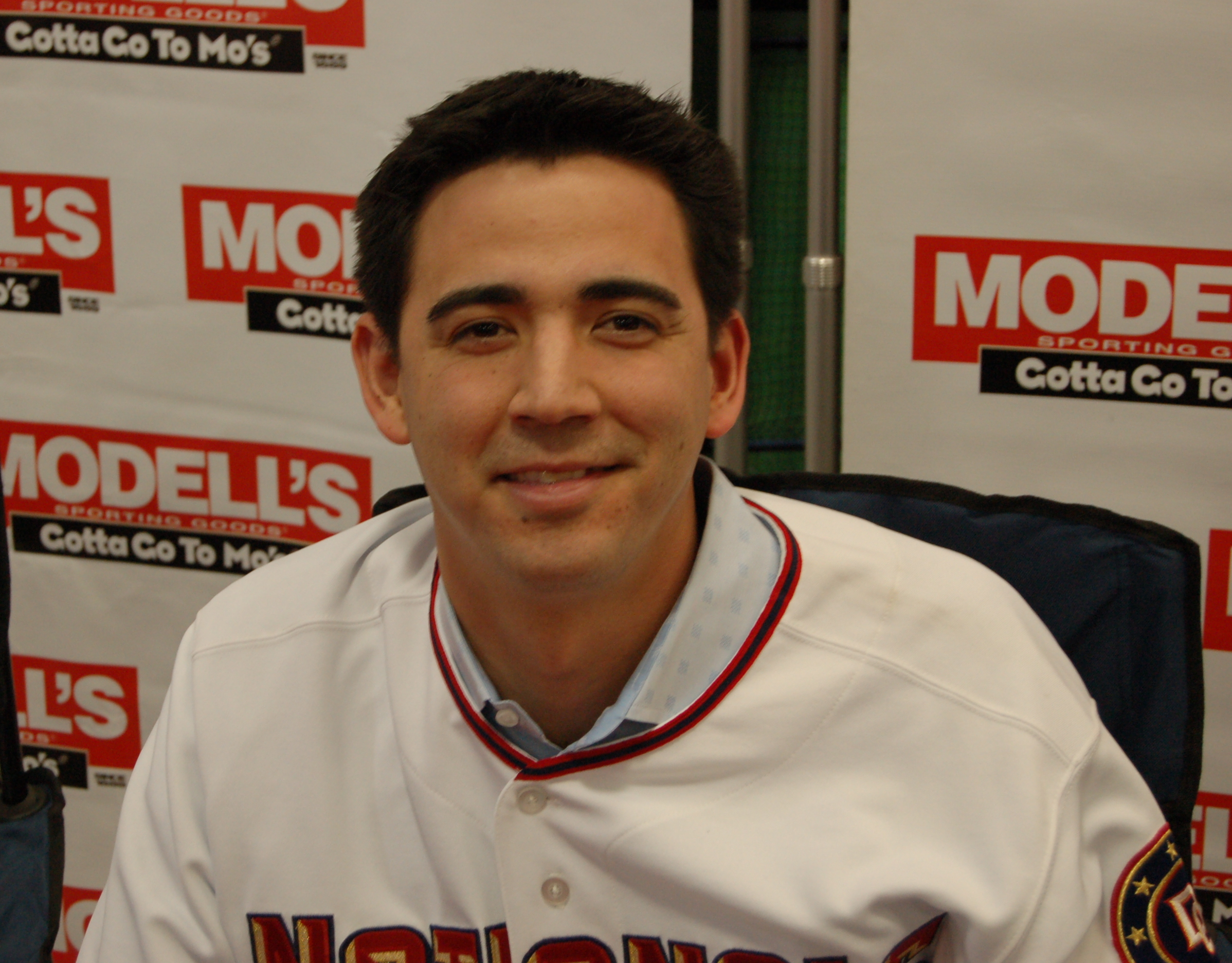
- O'Connor with the Washington Nationals
- Pitcher
- Born: August 17, 1980 (age 45); Dallas, Texas, U.S.
- Batted: Left Threw: Left

MLB debut
- April 27, 2006, for the Washington Nationals

Last MLB appearance
- June 1, 2011, for the New York Mets

MLB statistics
- Win–loss record: 4–10
- Earned run average: 5.30
- Strikeouts: 71
- Stats at Baseball Reference

Teams
- Washington Nationals (2006, 2008); New York Mets (2011)

Michael Patrick O'Connor (born August 17, 1980) is an American former professional baseball pitcher.

== Playing career ==
=== Washington Nationals ===
O'Connor's Major League Baseball debut was April 27, 2006, for the Washington Nationals against the St. Louis Cardinals, in which he earned a loss. He went five innings, gave up 3 runs on three hits, struck out two and walked four. He was called up from Triple-A New Orleans replacing the injured John Patterson. On July 6, he was optioned back to Triple-A New Orleans. On July 17, he was recalled in place of Patterson, who had been put back on to the disabled list.

=== San Diego Padres ===
On June 17, 2009, O'Connor was traded to the San Diego Padres for a player to be named later. He was released on August 10.

=== Kansas City Royals ===
On August 18, O'Connor signed a minor league contract with the Kansas City Royals, where he finished the season.

=== New York Mets ===
O'Connor joined the New York Mets organization at the start of the 2010 season.

He had his contract purchased by the Mets on May 4, 2011. After the 2011 season, he elected for free agency.

=== New York Yankees ===
O'Connor signed with the New York Yankees on November 15 to a minor league deal.
