= Robert Fick =

American baseball player (born 1974)

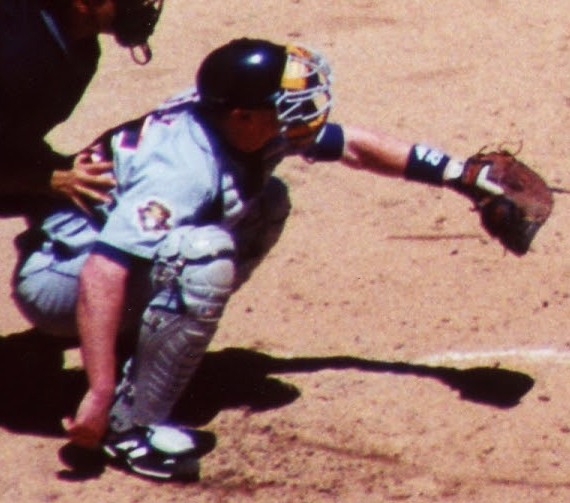
- Fick with the Detroit Tigers in 2001
- First baseman / Right fielder / Catcher
- Born: March 15, 1974 (age 52); Torrance, California, U.S.
- Batted: Left Threw: Right

MLB debut
- September 19, 1998, for the Detroit Tigers

Last MLB appearance
- September 29, 2007, for the Washington Nationals

MLB statistics
- Batting average: .258
- Home runs: 69
- Runs batted in: 324
- Stats at Baseball Reference

Teams
- Detroit Tigers (1998–2002); Atlanta Braves (2003); Tampa Bay Devil Rays (2004); San Diego Padres (2004–2005); Washington Nationals (2006–2007)

Career highlights and awards
- All-Star (2002)

Robert Charles Fick (born March 15, 1974) is an American former professional baseball first baseman. He played in Major League Baseball (MLB) for the Detroit Tigers, Atlanta Braves, Tampa Bay Devil Rays, San Diego Padres, and Washington Nationals. In 2002, he was named to the American League All-Star Team.

== Career ==
The left-handed batter, who throws right-handed, attended Ventura College and later transferred to California State University at Northridge. He was drafted by the Detroit Tigers in the 5th round of the 1996 amateur draft.

Fick made his major league debut with the Tigers in 1998. In the final game ever held at Tiger Stadium on September 27, 1999, Fick hit an eighth-inning grand slam home run against the Kansas City Royals. Fick's rooftop blast was the stadium's 11,111th and final home run, as well as the final hit, final run scored and final RBI. His breakout season came in 2001 when he hit.272 with a career-best 19 home runs. Fick had another fine offensive year in 2002, hitting 17 home runs and 36 doubles. He was named to the American League All-Star Team, the lone representative of the last-place Tigers. In 2002, he also led all major league right fielders in assists, with 21.

Fick signed with the Atlanta Braves for the 2003 season. He was released at year's end despite setting a career-high with 80 RBI. In a coincidental moment to the final Tiger Stadium hit, he also helped provide the final run at Veterans Stadium in Philadelphia on September 28, 2003, when his double in the top of the 5th helped Andruw Jones to score. He then played for the Tampa Bay Devil Rays, San Diego Padres, and Washington Nationals, though never enjoyed the same success.

Fick was inducted into the West Michigan Whitecaps Hall of Fame in January 2009 and played for Italy in the 2009 World Baseball Classic.

Defensively, Fick served as a utility player. He started his major league career as a catcher, but eventually played more games as a first baseman and a corner outfielder. He posted a career batting average of .258, with 69 home runs and 324 RBI in 846 games over 10 seasons.

Fick's brush with controversy occurred playing for the Atlanta Braves during the 2003 NLDS, when he ran past first base, slapping the catching arm of Cubs' first baseman Eric Karros just as Karros was catching a throw. He later admitted that it was done intentionally. Braves upper management fined him $25,000 and manager Bobby Cox also fined him an undisclosed additional amount. He was released by the Braves shortly thereafter opening the discussion that the "dirty play" on Karros was partly the reason. The last team he played for was the Orange County Flyers of the Golden Baseball League.

Fick is currently a roving instructor for the Los Angeles Dodgers farm system and was acting manager for the Great Lakes Loons when manager Luis Matos was serving a two-game suspension in June 2015.

On October 18, 2008, Fick was inducted into the Ventura College Athletic Hall of Fame.

== Personal ==
Fick is a former child actor. During the 1980s, he was an extra in Cheers, Who's the Boss?, and Webster. He also did a Gatorade commercial when he was 13 years old.
