= 2006 Los Angeles Dodgers season =

2006 Los Angeles Dodgers
- National League Wild Card winners
- League: National League
- Division: West
- Ballpark: Dodger Stadium
- City: Los Angeles
- Record: 88–74 (.543)
- Divisional place: 2nd
- Owners: Frank McCourt
- President: Jamie McCourt
- General managers: Ned Colletti
- Managers: Grady Little
- Television: Fox Sports Prime Ticket; KCAL-TV (9); Vin Scully, Charley Steiner, Steve Lyons
- Radio: KFWB; Vin Scully, Rick Monday, Charley Steiner, Jerry Reuss; KWKW; Jaime Jarrín, Pepe Yñiguez, Fernando Valenzuela

The 2006 Los Angeles Dodgers season was the 117th season for the Los Angeles Dodgers franchise in Major League Baseball (MLB), their 49th season in Los Angeles, California, and their 44th season playing their home games at Dodger Stadium in Los Angeles California.

The Dodgers looked to improve their record from 2005. The team switched General Managers from Paul DePodesta to Ned Colletti, and hired Grady Little as the new manager. This was also their first season to be broadcast on KCAL-TV (9). The Dodgers won 88 games and the National League wild card. In the NLDS the Dodgers dropped three straight games to the New York Mets, ending their season. This was the last time the Dodgers were swept in the postseason until 2023.

== Offseason ==
- December 13, 2005: Acquired Andre Ethier from the Oakland Athletics for Milton Bradley and Antonio Perez.
- December 19, 2005: Signed free agent Nomar Garciaparra.
- January 4, 2006: Acquired Jae Seo and Tim Hamulack from the New York Mets for Duaner Sánchez and Steve Schmoll.
- January 14, 2006: Acquired Danys Báez and Lance Carter from the Tampa Bay Devil Rays for Edwin Jackson and Chuck Tiffany.

== Regular season ==
=== Season standings ===
==== National League West ====
NL West
Team	W	L	Pct.	GB	Home	Road
San Diego Padres	88	74	.543	—	43‍–‍38	45‍–‍36
Los Angeles Dodgers	88	74	.543	—	49‍–‍32	39‍–‍42
San Francisco Giants	76	85	.472	11½	43‍–‍38	33‍–‍47
Arizona Diamondbacks	76	86	.469	12	39‍–‍42	37‍–‍44
Colorado Rockies	76	86	.469	12	44‍–‍37	32‍–‍49

==== Record vs. opponents ====
2006 National League record Source: MLB Standings Grid – 2006
Team	AZ	ATL	CHC	CIN	COL	FLA	HOU	LAD	MIL	NYM	PHI	PIT	SD	SF	STL	WAS	AL
Arizona	—	6–1	4–2	4–2	12–7	2–4	4–5	8–10	3–3	1–6	1–5	5–1	9–10	8–11	4–3	1–5	4–11
Atlanta	1–6	—	6–1	4–3	3–3	11–8	3–4	3–3	2–4	7–11	7–11	3–3	7–2	3–4	4–2	10–8	5–10
Chicago	2–4	1–6	—	10–9	2–4	2–4	7–8	4–2	8–8	3–3	2–5	6–9	0–7	2–4	11–8	2–4	4–11
Cincinnati	2–4	3–4	9–10	—	5–1	4–2	10–5	0–6	9–10	3–4	2–4	9–7	2–4	2–5	9–6	5–1	6-9
Colorado	7–12	3–3	4–2	1–5	—	3–3	4–2	4–15	2–4	1–5	3–4	3–3	10–9	10–8	2–7	8–0	11–4
Florida	4–2	8–11	4–2	2–4	3–3	—	3–4	1–5	7–0	8–11	6–13	5–2	3–3	3–3	1–5	11–7	9–9
Houston	5–4	4–3	8–7	5–10	2–4	4-3	—	3–3	10–5	2–4	2–4	13–3	3–3	1–5	9–7	4–4	7–11
Los Angeles	10–8	3–3	2–4	6–0	15–4	5–1	3–3	—	4–2	3–4	4–3	6–4	5–13	13–6	0–7	4–2	5–10
Milwaukee	3–3	4–2	8–8	10–9	4–2	0–7	5–10	2–4	—	3–3	5–1	7–9	4–3	6–3	7–9	1–5	6–9
New York	6–1	11–7	3–3	4–3	5–1	11–8	4–2	4–3	3–3	—	11–8	5–4	5–2	3–3	4–2	12–6	6–9
Philadelphia	5-1	11–7	5–2	4–2	4–3	13–6	4–2	3–4	1–5	8–11	—	3–3	2–4	5–1	3–3	9–10	5–13
Pittsburgh	1–5	3–3	9–6	7–9	3–3	2–5	3–13	4–6	9–7	4–5	3–3	—	1–5	6–1	6–9	3–3	3–12
San Diego	10–9	2–7	7–0	4–2	9–10	3–3	3–3	13–5	3–4	2–5	4–2	5–1	—	7–12	4–2	5–1	7–8
San Francisco	11–8	4–3	4–2	5–2	8–10	3–3	5–1	6–13	3–6	3–3	1–5	1–6	12–7	—	1–4	1–5	8–7
St. Louis	3–4	2–4	8–11	6–9	7–2	5-1	7–9	7–0	9–7	2–4	3–3	9–6	2–4	4–1	—	4–3	5–10
Washington	5–1	8–10	4–2	1–5	0–8	7-11	4–4	2–4	5–1	6–12	10–9	3–3	1–5	5–1	3–4	—	7–11

== Game log ==
Legend
	Dodgers win
	Dodgers loss
	Postponement
**Bold**	Dodgers team member

2006 game log
April (12-13)

#	Date	Opponent	Score	Win	Loss	Save	Attendance	Record
1	April 3	Atlanta Braves	11-10	Villarreal (1-0)	**Lowe** (0-1)	Reitsma (1)	56,000	0-1
2	April 4	Atlanta Braves	4-5	**Penny** (1-0)	Smoltz (0-1)	**Báez** (1)	36,249	1-1
3	April 5	Atlanta Braves	9-8	Villarreal (2-0)	**Osoria** (0-1)	Reitsma (2)	35,292	1-2
4	April 7	@ Philadelphia Phillies	5-3	**Tomko** (1-0)	Floyd (0-1)	**Báez** (2)	25,518	2-2
--	April 8	@ Philadelphia Phillies	3:05pm	PPD, RAIN; rescheduled for April 9				
5	April 9	@ Philadelphia Phillies	3-6	Gordon (1-1)	**Hamulack** (0-1)	None	–	2-3
6	April 9	@ Philadelphia Phillies	6-2	**Penny** (2-0)	Lieber (0-2)	None	38,056	3-3
7	April 10	@ Pittsburgh Pirates	8-3	**Pérez** (1-0)	Duke (0-1)	None	39,129	4-3
8	April 11	@ Pittsburgh Pirates	6-7	Torres (1-1)	**Carter** (0-1)	Gonzalez (1)	17,240	4-4
9	April 12	@ Pittsburgh Pirates	5-9	Torres (2-1)	**Kuo** (0-1)	None	13,237	4-5
10	April 13	@ Pittsburgh Pirates	13-5	**Lowe** (1-1)	Pérez (0-2)	None	18,134	5-5
11	April 14	San Francisco Giants	2-1	Wright	**Kuo** (0-2)	Worrell (4)	45,940	5-6
12	April 15	San Francisco Giants	1-3	**Pérez** (2-0)	Schmidt (0-2)	**Báez** (3)	55,132	6-6
13	April 16	San Francisco Giants	2-0	Hennessey (1-0)	**Seo** (0-1)	Worrell (5)	47,024	6-7
14	April 17	Chicago Cubs	4-1	Maddux (3-0)	**Tomko** (1-1)	Dempster (3)	33,551	6-8
15	April 18	Chicago Cubs	1-2	**Saito** (1-0)	Ohman (1-1)	None	37,340	7-8
16	April 19	Chicago Cubs	5-4	Williamson (2-0)	**Báez** (0-1)	Dempster (4)	41,288	7-9
17	April 21	Arizona Diamondbacks	3-6	**Pérez** (3-0)	Hernandez (1-3)	**Daez** (4)	44,294	8-9
18	April 22	Arizona Diamondbacks	5-4	Batista (2-0)	**Seo** (0-2)	Valverde (3)	51,878	8-10
19	April 23	Arizona Diamondbacks	4-6	**Tomko** (2-1)	Ortiz (0-3)	**Báez** (5)	48,394	9-10
20	April 24	@ Houston Astros	6-2	**Saito** (2-0)	Lidge (0-1)	**Báez** (6)	28,382	10-10
21	April 25	@ Houston Astros	3-4 (14)	Astacio (2-0)	**Kuo** (0-3)	None	30,451	10-11
22	April 26	@ Houston Astros	5-8	Rodríguez (4-0)	**Pérez** (3-1)	None	32,874	10-12
23	April 28	@ San Diego Padres	3-0	**Seo** (1-2)	Young (2-2)	**Báez** (7)	36,435	11-12
24	April 29	@ San Diego Padres	4-2	**Tomko** (3-1)	Hensley (1-2)	**Báez** (8)	44,337	12-12
25	April 30	@ San Diego Padres	5-6 (10)	Linebrink (2-2)	**Hamulack** (0-2)	None	38,116	12-13

May (18-10)

#	Date	Opponent	Score	Win	Loss	Save	Attendance	Record
26	May 1	@ Arizona Diamondbacks	2-3	Vargas (3-1)	**Penny** (2-1)	Valverde (6)	20,100	12-14
27	May 2	@ Arizona Diamondbacks	8-10	Vizcaino (1-2)	**Saito** (2-1)	Valverde (7)	23,216	12-15
28	May 3	San Diego Padres	11-5	Cassidy (1-0)	**Osoria** (0-2)	None	33,352	12-16
29	May 4	San Diego Padres	3-0	Embree (1-0)	**Saito** (2-2)	Hoffman (5)	34,137	12-17
30	May 5	Milwaukee Brewers	3-4	**Báez** (1-1)	Wise (2-2)	None	47,731	13-17
31	May 6	Milwaukee Brewers	4-5	**Báez** (2-1)	Demaria (0-1)	None	46,087	14-17
32	May 7	Milwaukee Brewers	2-10	**Sele** (1-0)	Bush (2-4)	None	53,528	15-17
33	May 9	Houston Astros	7-12	**Saito** (3-2)	Wheeler (0-2)	None	55,992	16-17
34	May 10	Houston Astros	6-9	**Tomko** (4-1)	Buchholz (2-2)	None	33,595	17-17
35	May 11	Houston Astros	4-2	Rodríguez (5-1)	**Lowe** (1-2)	Wheeler (1)	37,133	17-18
36	May 12	@ San Francisco Giants	6-1	**Penny** (3-1)	Morris (2-4)	None	42,885	18-18
37	May 13	@ San Francisco Giants	5-6	Benítez (2-0)	**Báez** (2-2)	None	42,864	18-19
38	May 14	@ San Francisco Giants	6-3	**Pérez** (4-1)	Kline (1-1)	**Beimel** (1)	42,985	19-19
39	May 15	@ Colorado Rockies	5-4	**Tomko** (5-1)	Ramírez (2-1)	**Saito** (1)	20,208	20-19
40	May 16	@ Colorado Rockies	1-5	Kim (2-1)	**Lowe** (1-3)	None	23,192	20-20
41	May 17	@ Colorado Rockies	3-2	**Penny** (4-1)	Jennings (2-4)	**Báez** (9)	30,296	21-20
42	May 19	Los Angeles Angels	3-16	**Sele** (2-0)	Weaver (1-7)	None	55,655	22-20
43	May 20	Los Angeles Angels	4-8	**Beimel** (1-0)	Shields (1-3)	None	55,587	23-20
44	May 21	Los Angeles Angels	0-7	**Lowe** (2-3)	Santana (4-2)	None	55,662	24-20
45	May 22	Colorado Rockies	1-6	**Seo** (2-2)	Kim (2-2)	None	33,652	25-20
46	May 23	Colorado Rockies	1-8	**Penny** (5-1)	Jennings (2-5)	None	40,228	26-20
47	May 24	Colorado Rockies	1-7	**Sele** (3-0)	Cook (5-4)	None	39,299	27-20
48	May 26	@ Washington Nationals	4-10	Hernández (3-5)	**Tomko** (5-2)	None	22,712	27-21
49	May 27	@ Washington Nationals	3-1	**Lowe** (3-3)	Stanton (1-5)	**Saito** (2)	26,867	28-21
50	May 28	@ Washington Nationals	4-10	Ortiz (3-4)	**Seo** (2-3)	None	30,348	28-22
51	May 29	@ Atlanta Braves	12-5	**Beimel** (2-0)	Thomson (2-4)	None	41,825	29-22
52	May 30	@ Atlanta Braves	8-3	**Báez** (3-2)	Remlinger (2-3)	None	29,517	30-22
53	May 31	@ Atlanta Braves	3-9	Hudson (5-3)	**Tomko** (5-3)	None	28,880	30-23

June (11-15)

#	Date	Opponent	Score	Win	Loss	Save	Attendance	Record
54	June 1	Philadelphia Phillies	2-7	**Lowe** (4-3)	Floyd (4-3)	None	38,643	31-23
55	June 2	Philadelphia Phillies	8-6	Geary (2-0)	**Báez** (3-3)	Gordon (16)	55,142	31-24
56	June 3	Philadelphia Phillies	2-8	**Penny** (6-1)	Brito (0-1)	None	46,561	32-24
57	June 4	Philadelphia Phillies	6-4	Geary (3-0)	**Beimel** (2-1)	Gordon (17)	48,270	32-25
58	June 5	New York Mets	4-1	Soler (1-1)	**Tomko** (5-4)	Bradford (1)	34,420	32-26
59	June 6	New York Mets	5-8	**Lowe** (5-3)	Martínez (5-2)	**Gagné** (1)	46,347	33-26
60	June 7	New York Mets	9-7	Glavine (9-2)	**Pérez** (4-2)	Wagner (12)	44,320	33-27
61	June 9	@ Colorado Rockies	3-0	**Penny** (7-1)	Kim (3-4)	**Saito** (3)	30,455	34-27
62	June 10	@ Colorado Rockies	9-12	Jennings (4-6)	**Tomko** (5-5)	Fuentes (13)	35,557	34-28
63	June 11	@ Colorado Rockies	6-5	**Báez** (4-3)	Fuentes (1-1)	**Saito** (4)	29,221	35-28
64	June 13	@ San Diego Padres	1-9	Park (4-3)	**Sele** (3-1)	None	30,371	35-29
65	June 14	@ San Diego Padres	3-5	Linebrink (3-2)	**Kuo** (0-4)	Hoffman (15)	30,011	35-30
66	June 15	@ San Diego Padres	7-3	**Broxton** (1-0)	Sikorski (0-1)	None	33,382	36-30
67	June 16	@ Oakland Athletics	3-7	Zito (8-3)	**Tomko** (5-6)	None	30,161	36-31
68	June 17	@ Oakland Athletics	4-5 (17)	Karsay (1-0)	**Seo** (2-4)	None	35,077	36-32
69	June 18	@ Oakland Athletics	2-5	Blanton (7-6)	**Sele** (3-2)	Street (17)	35,077	36-33
70	June 20	Seattle Mariners	9-4	Piñeiro (6-7)	**Penny** (7-2)	Soriano (2)	43,949	36-34
71	June 21	Seattle Mariners	8-5	Mateo (4-0)	**Báez** (4-4)	Putz (12)	40,419	36-35
72	June 22	Seattle Mariners	2-4	**Lowe** (6-3)	Hernández (7-7)	None	46,207	37-35
73	June 23	Pittsburgh Pirates	4-10	**Tomko** (6-6)	Pérez (2-10)	None	55,823	38-35
74	June 24	Pittsburgh Pirates	0-7	**Sele** (4-2)	Duke (5-7)	None	47,785	39-35
75	June 25	Pittsburgh Pirates	4-7	**Penny** (8-2)	Wells (0-2)	**Saito** (5)	55,545	40-35
76	June 26	@ Minnesota Twins	2-8	Silva (4-8)	**Billingsley** (0-1)	None	22,528	40-36
77	June 27	@ Minnesota Twins	2-9	Liriano (8-1)	**Lowe** (6-4)	None	30,681	40-37
78	June 28	@ Minnesota Twins	3-6	Santana (9-4)	**Pérez** (4-3)	Nathan (13)	34,157	40-38
79	June 30	@ Los Angeles Angels	6-1	**Penny** (9-2)	Colon (0-4)	None	44,233	41-38

July (9-17)

#	Date	Opponent	Score	Win	Loss	Save	Attendance	Record
80	July 1	@ Los Angeles Angels	2-9	Escobar (6-9)	**Hendrickson** (4-9)	None	43,891	41-39
81	July 2	@ Los Angeles Angels	0-4	Lackey (6-5)	**Billingsley** (0-2)	None	44,223	41-40
82	July 3	Arizona Diamondbacks	4-10	**Lowe** (7-4)	Cruz (3-4)	None	47,698	42-40
83	July 4	Arizona Diamondbacks	3-11	**Sele** (5-2)	Gonzalez (2-2)	None	55,816	43-40
84	July 5	Arizona Diamondbacks	4-5	**Penny** (10-2)	Vargas (7-5)	**Saito** (6)	38,505	44-40
85	July 6	San Francisco Giants	5-4	Hennessey (4-1)	**Hendrickson** (4-10)	Benítez (9)	42,515	44-41
86	July 7	San Francisco Giants	7-9	**Báez** (5-4)	Accardo (1-3)	**Saito** (7)	53,991	45-41
87	July 8	San Francisco Giants	11-7	Lowry (4-5)	**Lowe** (7-5)	Benítez (10)	46,496	45-42
88	July 9	San Francisco Giants	1-3	**Sele** (6-2)	Schmidt (6-5)	**Saito** (8)	41,849	46-42
89	July 13	@ St. Louis Cardinals	2-3 (14)	Looper (5-1)	**Pérez** (4-4)	None	45,156	46-43
90	July 14	@ St. Louis Cardinals	0-5	Carpenter (8-4)	**Lowe** (7-6)	None	45,704	46-44
91	July 15	@ St. Louis Cardinals	1-2 (10)	Looper (6-1)	**Báez** (5-5)	None	46,068	46-45
92	July 16	@ St. Louis Cardinals	3-11	Reyes (2-3)	**Penny** (10-3)	None	44,741	46-46
93	July 17	@ Arizona Diamondbacks	3-8	González (3-2)	**Sele** (6-3)	None	23,513	46-47
94	July 18	@ Arizona Diamondbacks	4-1	**Billingsley** (1-2)	Cruz (3-5)	None	27,478	47-47
95	July 19	@ Arizona Diamondbacks	0-8	Batista (9-5)	**Lowe** (7-7)	None	23,616	47-48
96	July 20	@ Arizona Diamondbacks	2-5	Webb (11-3)	**Hendrickson** (4-11)	Julio (11)	25,329	47-49
97	July 21	St. Louis Cardinals	2-0	Suppan (7-5)	**Penny** (10-4)	Isringhausen (27)	47,987	47-50
98	July 22	St. Louis Cardinals	6-1	Weaver (4-11)	**Sele** (6-4)	None	50,438	47-51
99	July 23	St. Louis Cardinals	6-1	Marquis (12-7)	**Billingsley** (1-3)	None	43,650	47-52
100	July 24	San Diego Padres	7-6 (11)	Brocail (1-0)	**Carrara** (0-1)	Hoffman (27)	38,050	47-53
101	July 25	San Diego Padres	7-3	Park (7-6)	**Hendrickson** (4-12)	None	51,334	47-54
102	July 26	San Diego Padres	10-3	Peavy (5-10)	**Penny** (10-5)	None	44,181	47-55
103	July 28	Washington Nationals	1-13	**Billingsley** (2-3)	Armas (7-6)	None	55,825	48-55
104	July 29	Washington Nationals	5-7	**Lowe** (8-7)	O'Connor (3-7)	**Broxton** (1)	41,540	49-55
105	July 30	Washington Nationals	3-4	**Broxton** (2-0)	Rauch (3-2)	**Saito** (9)	43,346	50-55

August (21-7)

#	Date	Opponent	Score	Win	Loss	Save	Attendance	Record
106	August 1	@ Cincinnati Reds	10-4	**Sele** (7-4)	Bray (2-2)	None	25,127	51-55
107	August 2	@ Cincinnati Reds	5-3	**Penny** (11-5)		**Saito** (10)	22,114	52-55
108	August 3	@ Cincinnati Reds	3-0	**Maddux** (10-11)	Milton (7-7)	**Saito** (11)	26,045	53-55
109	August 4	@ Florida Marlins	6-2	**Lowe** (9-7)	Sánchez (4-2)	None	15,416	54-55
110	August 5	@ Florida Marlins	10-2	**Billingsley** (3-3)	Johnson (9-6)	None	17,863	55-55
111	August 6	@ Florida Marlins	7-3	**Hendrickson** (5-12)	Olsen (9-5)	None	14,182	56-55
112	August 7	Colorado Rockies	2-7	**Penny** (12-5)	Fogg (7-7)	None	44,593	57-55
113	August 8	Colorado Rockies	2-4	**Tomko** (7-6)	Kim (7-7)	**Saito** (12)	50,210	58-55
114	August 9	Colorado Rockies	3-1	Affeldt (6-6)	**Lowe** (9-8)	Fuentes (23)	46,643	58-56
115	August 10	Colorado Rockies	3-4	**Saito** (4-2)	Mesa (0-5)	None	48,699	59-56
116	August 11	San Francisco Giants	2-3	**Tomko** (8-6)	Stanton (3-6)	**Broxton** (2)	53,695	60-56
117	August 12	San Francisco Giants	5-6	**Penny** (13-5)	Cain (8-9)	**Saito** (13)	46,444	61-56
118	August 13	San Francisco Giants	0-1 (10)	**Saito** (5-2)	Chulk (1-1)	None	55,699	62-56
119	August 14	Florida Marlins	2-4	**Lowe** (10-8)	Willis (7-10)	**Giovanni Carrara** (1)	44,749	63-56
120	August 15	Florida Marlins	0-4	**Billingsley** (4-3)	Messenger (1-7)	None	47,960	64-56
121	August 16	Florida Marlins	15-4	Johnson (11-6)	**Hendrickson** (5-13)	None	38,185	64-57
122	August 18	@ San Francisco Giants	3-7	Schmidt (10-7)	**Penny** (13-6)	None	42,862	64-58
123	August 19	@ San Francisco Giants	14-7	**Maddux** (11-11)	Hennessey (5-3)	None	42,833	65-58
124	August 20	@ San Francisco Giants	5-2	**Lowe** (11-8)	Morris (8-11)	**Saito** (14)	42,052	66-58
125	August 21	@ San Diego Padres	2-4	Stauffer (1-0)	**Dessens** (5-8)	Hoffman (32)	33,244	66-59
126	August 22	@ San Diego Padres	0-1	Peavy (7-12)	**Hendrickson** (5-14)	Hoffman (33)	32,774	66-60
127	August 23	@ San Diego Padres	2-7	Williams (7-4)	**Penny** (13-7)	None	36,613	66-61
128	August 25	@ Arizona Diamondbacks	7-9 (15)	Lyon (2-3)	**Sele** (7-5)	None	26,293	66-62
129	August 26	@ Arizona Diamondbacks	4-3	**Broxton** (3-0)	Vizcaíno (3-4)	**Saito** (15)	40,388	67-62
130	August 27	@ Arizona Diamondbacks	6-3	**Billingsley** (5-3)	Hernández (10-11)	**Saito** (16)	30,350	68-62
131	August 28	Cincinnati Reds	5-6	**Penny** (14-7)	Michalak (1-2)	**Broxton** (3)	44,176	69-62
132	August 29	Cincinnati Reds	5-6 (16)	**Lowe** (12-8)	Franklin (5-7)	None	44,697	70-62
133	August 30	Cincinnati Reds	3-7	**Maddux** (12-11)	Harang (13-10)	None	47,356	71-62

September (16-12)

#	Date	Opponent	Score	Win	Loss	Save	Attendance	Record
134	September 1	Colorado Rockies	3-6	**Lowe** (13-8)	Jennings (7-12)	**Saito** (17)	49,601	72-62
135	September 2	Colorado Rockies	5-14	**Penny** (15-7)	Cook (9-13)	None	48,984	73-62
136	September 3	Colorado Rockies	12-5	Kim (8-10)	**Sele** (7-6)	None	44,895	73-63
137	September 4	@ Milwaukee Brewers	3-6	Bush (10-10)	**Maddux** (12-12)	Cordero (17)	33,645	73-64
138	September 5	@ Milwaukee Brewers	0-9	Davis (10-9)	**Hendrickson** (5-15)	None	13,427	73-65
139	September 6	@ Milwaukee Brewers	2-1	**Lowe** (14-8)	Capuano (11-10)	**Saito** (18)	25,106	74-65
140	September 7	@ New York Mets	0-7	Glavine (13-6)	**Penny** (15-8)	None	48,583	74-66
141	September 8	@ New York Mets	5-0	**Kuo** (1-4)	Maine (5-4)	None	52,077	75-66
142	September 9	@ New York Mets	2-3	Hernández (10-10)	**Maddux** (12-13)	**Wagner** (36)	47,064	75-67
143	September 10	@ New York Mets	9-1	**Stults** (1-0)	Trachsel (14-7)	None	48,760	76-67
144	September 12	@ Chicago Cubs	8-9 (11)	Aardsman (2-0)	**Hamulack** (0-3)	None	35,618	76-68
145	September 13	@ Chicago Cubs	6-0	**Penny** (16-8)	Guzman (0-6)	None	35,868	77-68
146	September 14	@ Chicago Cubs	5-6	Eyre (1-2)	**Tomko** (8-7)	Howry (5)	31,361	77-69
147	September 15	San Diego Padres	1-3	**Maddux** (13-13)	Wells (2-4)	**Saito** (19)	52,911	78-69
148	September 16	San Diego Padres	11-2	Williams (9-5)	**Billingsley** (5-4)	Sweeney (2)	55,781	78-70
149	September 17	San Diego Padres	1-2	Linebrink (7-3)	**Broxton** (3-1)	Hoffman (39)	54,601	78-71
150	September 18	San Diego Padres	11-10 (10)	**Sele** (8-6)	Seánez (3-3)	None	55,831	79-71
151	September 19	Pittsburgh Pirates	10-6	Snell (8-6)	**Kuo** (1-5)	None	43,734	79-72
152	September 20	Pittsburgh Pirates	6-4	Chacón (7-6)	**Maddux** (13-14)	Torres (10)	46,319	79-73
153	September 21	Pittsburgh Pirates	2-5	**Billingsley** (6-4)	Youman (0-2)	**Saito** (20)	48,567	80-73
154	September 22	Arizona Diamondbacks	0-2	**Lowe** (15-8)	Vargas (11-10)	**Saito** (21)	43,990	81-73
155	September 23	Arizona Diamondbacks	9-3	Batista (11-7)	**Penny** (16-9)	None	49,791	81-74
156	September 24	Arizona Diamondbacks	1-5	**Saito** (6-2)	Vizcaino (4-6)	None	49,822	82-74
157	September 26	@ Colorado Rockies	11-4	**Maddux** (14-14)	Jennings (9-13)	None	20,133	83-74
158	September 27	@ Colorado Rockies	6-4	**Lowe** (16-8)	Cook (9-15)	**Saito** (22)	18,858	84-74
159	September 28	@ Colorado Rockies	19-11	**Hendrickson** (6-15)	King (1-4)	None	21,154	85-74
160	September 29	@ San Francisco Giants	4-3	**Broxton** (4-1)	Stanton (7-7)	**Saito** (23)	42,587	86-74
161	September 30	@ San Francisco Giants	4-2	**Maddux** (15-14)	Cain (13-12)	**Saito** (24)	42,769	87-74

October (1-0)

#	Date	Opponent	Score	Win	Loss	Save	Attendance	Record
162	October 1	@ San Francisco Giants	4-3	**Billingsley** (7-4)	Hennessey (5-6)	**Beimel** (2)	42,831	88-74

=== Season summary ===
After a season battling injuries to team leaders Jeff Kent and all-star Nomar Garciaparra, the Dodgers were able to produce with several young rookies such as Russell Martin, Andre Ethier, James Loney, Chad Billingsley, and Jonathan Broxton. Key reliever Yhency Brazobán was sidelined with Tommy John surgery, and closer Éric Gagné was sidelined with a back injury. However, rookie pitcher Takashi Saito took over the closing role and instantly became one of the game's best closers, ending the season with 24 saves in just half of the season.

Los Angeles had a very streaky season in 2006. After they started just 12–17, the Dodgers went on to win 15 of their next 18 games to improve to 27-20. They were 46-42 at the all-star break, two games back of the San Diego Padres in a tough division (all five teams in the N.L. West were .500 or better at the all-star break). Two Dodger players, Nomar Garciaparra, and Brad Penny, were selected to play in the All-Star Game.

After the all-star break, the Dodgers lost 13 of their first 14 games. As a result, their record dropped to 47–55, and they were in last place in the N.L. West, 7½ games out of first place. Los Angeles bounded back from this losing streak to win 17 out of their next 18 games, the first time the Dodgers did so since 1899. At the end of this winning stretch, Los Angeles was in first place with a record of 64–56. During this stretch, the Dodgers acquired Wilson Betemit from the Atlanta Braves, Julio Lugo from the Tampa Bay Devil Rays, and pitcher Greg Maddux from the Chicago Cubs. Maddux proved to be the biggest transition for the Dodgers, as he provided the Dodgers' starting rotation with a veteran arm and pitching depth.

The highlight of the 2006 season for Los Angeles was on September 18, against the San Diego Padres. Coming into the four-game series, Los Angeles held a half game lead in the N.L. West over San Diego with two and a half weeks left in the season. Los Angeles won the first game of the series 3–1 after a strong pitching performance by Maddux, extending the Dodgers' lead to a 1½ games over San Diego. The second game of the series was an 11–2 rout in favor of San Diego, trimming the Dodgers lead back to a half game. The third game of the series was a pitchers' duel between San Diego's Chris Young and the Dodgers Derek Lowe. San Diego scored first after Russell Branyan hit a solo home run to make it 1-0. Russell Martin tied the game at 1-1 with a solo home run of his own in the 7th. But San Diego won the game 2-1 when Khalil Greene scored on Terrmel Sledge's single. San Diego's victory gave them a half game lead over the Dodgers in the N.L. West.

The last game of the series on September 18 was a rocky start for the Dodgers. Brad Penny gave up four runs in the first inning, giving San Diego a 4-0 lead. Los Angeles slowly climbed back into the game, and tied the score 4-4 in the third inning. Neither team scored again until San Diego scored two in the top of the 8th to take a 6-4 lead. The Dodgers would cut San Diego's lead to one run after Wilson Betemit drove in Marlon Anderson with an RBI single. San Diego scored three runs in the top of the 9th and appeared to have broken the game wide open with a 9-5 lead. With a four-run lead, San Diego elected to bring in Jon Adkins to pitch the 9th instead of closer Trevor Hoffman, who at the time was just three saves shy of tying the all-time record. Jeff Kent and J. D. Drew hit back-to-back home runs off of Adkins to close the lead to 9–7 with nobody out. San Diego then elected to bring Hoffman in to finish the game. Hoffman however, gave up back-to-back home runs to Martin and Anderson on the first two pitches Hoffman threw, tying the score at 9–9. It was only the fourth time a team hit four consecutive home runs in an inning, and the first time since the Minnesota Twins did so in 1964. San Diego scored a run in the top of the 10th on Josh Bard's RBI single to take a 10-9 lead. However, after Kenny Lofton walked, Nomar Garciaparra hit the game-winning two-run walk off home run. The Dodgers' 11–10 victory gave them a half game lead over San Diego with just two weeks left in the season.

San Diego and Los Angeles finished the season tied for first place in the NL West at 88–74. San Diego, however, was awarded the division title because they had won 13 of 18 games from Los Angeles during the regular season, giving the Dodgers the wild card spot.

=== Opening Day lineup ===
Opening Day starters
Name	Position
Rafael Furcal	Shortstop
José Cruz Jr.	Left fielder
J. D. Drew	Right fielder
Jeff Kent	Second baseman
Olmedo Sáenz	First baseman
Bill Mueller	Third baseman
Sandy Alomar Jr.	Catcher
Jason Repko	Center fielder
Derek Lowe	Starting pitcher

=== Notable transactions ===
- April 24, 2006: Acquired Ben Kozlowski from the Cincinnati Reds for Cody Ross.
- June 27, 2006: Acquired Mark Hendrickson, Toby Hall and cash from the Tampa Bay Devil Rays for Jae Seo, Dioner Navarro and Justin Ruggiano.
- July 23, 2006: Acquired B.J. LaMura from the Chicago White Sox for Sandy Alomar Jr.
- July 25, 2006: Acquired Elmer Dessens from the Kansas City Royals for Odalis Pérez, Blake Johnson, Julio Pimentel and cash.
- July 28, 2006: Acquired Wilson Betemit from the Atlanta Braves for Danys Báez, Willy Aybar and cash.
- July 31, 2006: Acquired Greg Maddux and cash from the Chicago Cubs for César Izturis.
- July 31, 2006: Acquired Julio Lugo from the Tampa Bay Devil Rays for Joel Guzman and Sergio Pedroza.
- August 31, 2006: Acquired Marlon Anderson from the Washington Nationals with cash for Jhonny Núñez.

=== Roster ===
2006 Los Angeles Dodgers
**Roster**
**Pitchers**: 10 Danys Báez; 97 Joe Beimel; 58 Chad Billingsley; 43 Yhency Brazobán; 51 Jonathan Broxton; 54 Giovanni Carrara; 36 Lance Carter; 45 Elmer Dessens; 38 Éric Gagné; 47 Tim Hamulack; 30 Mark Hendrickson; 56 Hong-Chih Kuo; 23 Derek Lowe; 36 Greg Maddux; 57 Franquelis Osoria; 31 Brad Penny; 45 Odalis Pérez; 44 Takashi Saito; 41 Aaron Sele; 26 Jae Weong Seo; 50 Eric Stults; 35 Brett Tomko	**Catchers**: 25 Sandy Alomar Jr.; 26 Einar Díaz; 26,22 Toby Hall; 55 Russell Martin; 30 Dioner Navarro; **Infielders**: 49 Willy Aybar; 10 Wilson Betemit; 15 Rafael Furcal; 5 Nomar Garciaparra; 50 Joel Guzmán; 3 César Izturis; 12 Jeff Kent; 27,29 James Loney; 3 Julio Lugo; 18 Ramón Martínez; 14 Bill Mueller; 13 Óscar Robles; 8 Olmedo Sáenz	**Outfielders**: 21 Marlon Anderson; 22 José Cruz Jr.; 7 J. D. Drew; 16 Andre Ethier; 27 Matt Kemp; 21 Ricky Ledée; 6 Kenny Lofton; 17 Jason Repko; 54 Cody Ross; 49 Delwyn Young	**Manager**: 9 Grady Little; **Coaches**: 40 Rick Honeycutt (pitching); 48 Dan Warthen (bullpen); 37 Rich Donnelly (third base); 46 Dave Jauss (bench); 11 Manny Mota; 25,29 Mariano Duncan (1st base); 33 Eddie Murray (hitting)

== Starting Pitchers stats ==
Note: G = Games pitched; GS = Games started; IP = Innings pitched; W/L = Wins/Losses; ERA = Earned run average; BB = Walks allowed; SO = Strikeouts; CG = Complete games

Name	G	GS	IP	W/L	ERA	BB	SO	CG
Derek Lowe	35	34	218.0	16-8	3.63	55	123	1
Brad Penny	34	33	189.0	16-9	4.33	54	148	0
Aaron Sele	28	15	103.1	8-6	4.53	30	57	0
Chad Billingsley	18	16	90.0	7-4	3.80	58	59	0
Mark Hendrickson	18	12	75.0	2-7	4.68	28	48	0
Greg Maddux	12	12	73.2	6-3	3.30	14	36	0
Jae Weong Seo	19	10	67.0	2-4	5.78	25	49	0

== Relief Pitchers stats ==
Note: G = Games pitched; GS = Games started; IP = Innings pitched; W/L = Wins/Losses; ERA = Earned run average; BB = Walks allowed; SO = Strikeouts; SV = Saves

Name	G	GS	IP	W/L	ERA	BB	SO	SV
Takashi Saito	72	0	78.1	6-2	2.07	23	107	24
Jonathan Broxton	68	0	76.1	4-1	2.59	33	97	3
Joe Beimel	62	0	70.0	2-1	2.96	21	30	2
Danys Báez	46	0	49.2	5-5	4.35	11	29	9
Tim Hamulack	33	0	34.0	0-3	6.35	22	34	0
Brett Tomko	44	15	112.1	8-7	4.73	29	76	0
Hong-Chih Kuo	28	5	59.2	1-5	4.22	33	71	0
Odalis Pérez	20	8	59.1	4-4	6.83	13	33	0
Giovanni Carrara	25	0	27.2	0-1	4.55	7	25	1
Elmer Dessens	19	0	23.0	0-1	4.70	9	16	0
Eric Stults	6	2	17.2	1-0	5.60	7	5	0
Franquelis Osoria	12	0	17.2	0-2	7.13	9	13	0
Lance Carter	10	0	11.2	0-1	8.49	8	5	0
Yhency Brazobán	5	0	5.0	0-0	5.40	2	4	0
Éric Gagné	2	0	2.0	0-0	0.00	1	3	1

== Batting Stats ==
Note: Pos = Position; G = Games played; AB = At bats; Avg. = Batting average; R = Runs scored; H = Hits; HR = Home runs; RBI = Runs batted in; SB = Stolen bases

Name	Pos	G	AB	Avg.	R	H	HR	RBI	SB
Russell Martin	C	121	415	.282	65	117	10	65	10
Dioner Navarro	C	25	75	.280	5	21	2	8	1
Sandy Alomar Jr.	C	27	62	.323	3	20	0	9	0
Toby Hall	C	21	57	.368	2	21	0	8	0
Einar Díaz	C	3	3	.667	0	2	0	0	0
Nomar Garciaparra	1B	122	469	.303	82	142	20	93	3
Jeff Kent	2B/1B	115	407	.292	61	119	14	68	1
Rafael Furcal	SS	159	654	.300	113	196	15	63	37
Wilson Betemit	3B	55	174	.241	19	42	9	24	1
Olmedo Sáenz	1B/3B	103	179	.296	30	53	11	48	0
Ramón Martínez	2B/3B/SS/1B/RF	82	176	.278	20	49	2	24	0
Julio Lugo	2B/3B/SS/RF/LF	49	146	.219	16	32	0	10	6
Willy Aybar	3B/2B	43	128	.250	15	32	3	22	1
César Izturis	3B/SS/2B	32	119	.252	10	30	1	12	1
Bill Mueller	3B	32	107	.252	12	27	3	15	1
James Loney	1B/RF	48	302	.284	20	29	4	18	1
Óscar Robles	2B/3B	29	33	.152	6	5	0	0	0
Joel Guzmán	3B/1B/LF	8	19	.211	2	4	0	3	0
Andre Ethier	LF	126	396	.308	50	122	11	55	5
Kenny Lofton	CF	129	469	.301	79	141	3	41	32
J. D. Drew	RF	146	494	.283	84	140	20	100	2
José Cruz Jr.	LF/RF/CF	86	223	.233	34	52	5	17	5
Matt Kemp	CF/LF/RF	52	154	.253	30	39	7	23	6
Jason Repko	CF/RF/LF	69	130	.254	21	33	3	16	10
Marlon Anderson	LF/RF/2B	25	64	.375	12	24	7	15	2
Ricky Ledée	LF/RF	43	53	.245	4	13	1	8	1
Cody Ross	RF/LF	8	14	.500	4	7	2	9	1
Delwyn Young	RF/LF	8	5	.000	0	0	0	0	0

== 2006 National League Division Series ==
Upon entering the playoffs, they were swept at Shea Stadium. Reliever Joe Beimel cut his hand on glass at a bar while drinking. Beimel told his teammates, he did it in his hotel room but then later revealed the truth. Beimel was sidelined during all of the Division Series.

=== Game 1, October 4 ===
Shea Stadium, Flushing Meadows, Queens, New York

Team	1	2	3	4	5	6	7	8	9	R	H	E
Los Angeles	0	1	0	0	0	0	3	0	1	5	11	1
New York	0	0	0	2	0	2	2	0	X	6	9	1
WP: Guillermo Mota (1-0) LP: Brad Penny (0-1) Sv: Billy Wagner (1); Home runs: LAD: None; NYM: Carlos Delgado (1), Cliff Floyd (1)

=== Game 2, October 5 ===
Shea Stadium, Flushing Meadows, Queens, New York

Team	1	2	3	4	5	6	7	8	9	R	H	E
Los Angeles	0	0	0	0	0	0	0	1	0	1	5	1
New York	0	0	1	0	1	2	0	0	X	4	7	0
WP: Tom Glavine (1-0) LP: Hong-Chih Kuo (0-1) Sv: Billy Wagner (2); Home runs: LAD: Wilson Betemit (1); NYM: None

=== Game 3, October 7 ===
Dodger Stadium, Los Angeles

Team	1	2	3	4	5	6	7	8	9	R	H	E
New York	3	0	1	0	0	3	0	2	0	9	14	2
Los Angeles	0	0	0	2	3	0	0	0	0	5	16	2
WP: Pedro Feliciano (1-0) LP: Jonathan Broxton (0-1); Home runs: NYM: None; LAD: Jeff Kent (1)

== 2006 Awards ==
- 2006 Major League Baseball All-Star Game
  - Brad Penny starting pitcher
  - Nomar Garciaparra reserve
- MLB Comeback Player of the Year Award
  - Nomar Garciaparra
- Gold Glove Award
  - Greg Maddux
- Pitcher of the Month
  - Derek Lowe (August 2006)
- Branch Rickey Award
  - Tommy Lasorda

== Farm system ==
Level	Team	League	Manager
AAA	Las Vegas 51s	Pacific Coast League	Jerry Royster
AA	Jacksonville Suns	Southern League	John Shoemaker
High A	Vero Beach Dodgers	Florida State League	Luis Salazar
A	Columbus Catfish	South Atlantic League	Travis Barbary
Rookie	Ogden Raptors	Pioneer League	Lance Parrish
Rookie	Gulf Coast Dodgers	Gulf Coast League	Juan Bustabad
Rookie	DSL Dodgers	Dominican Summer League	

== Major League Baseball draft ==
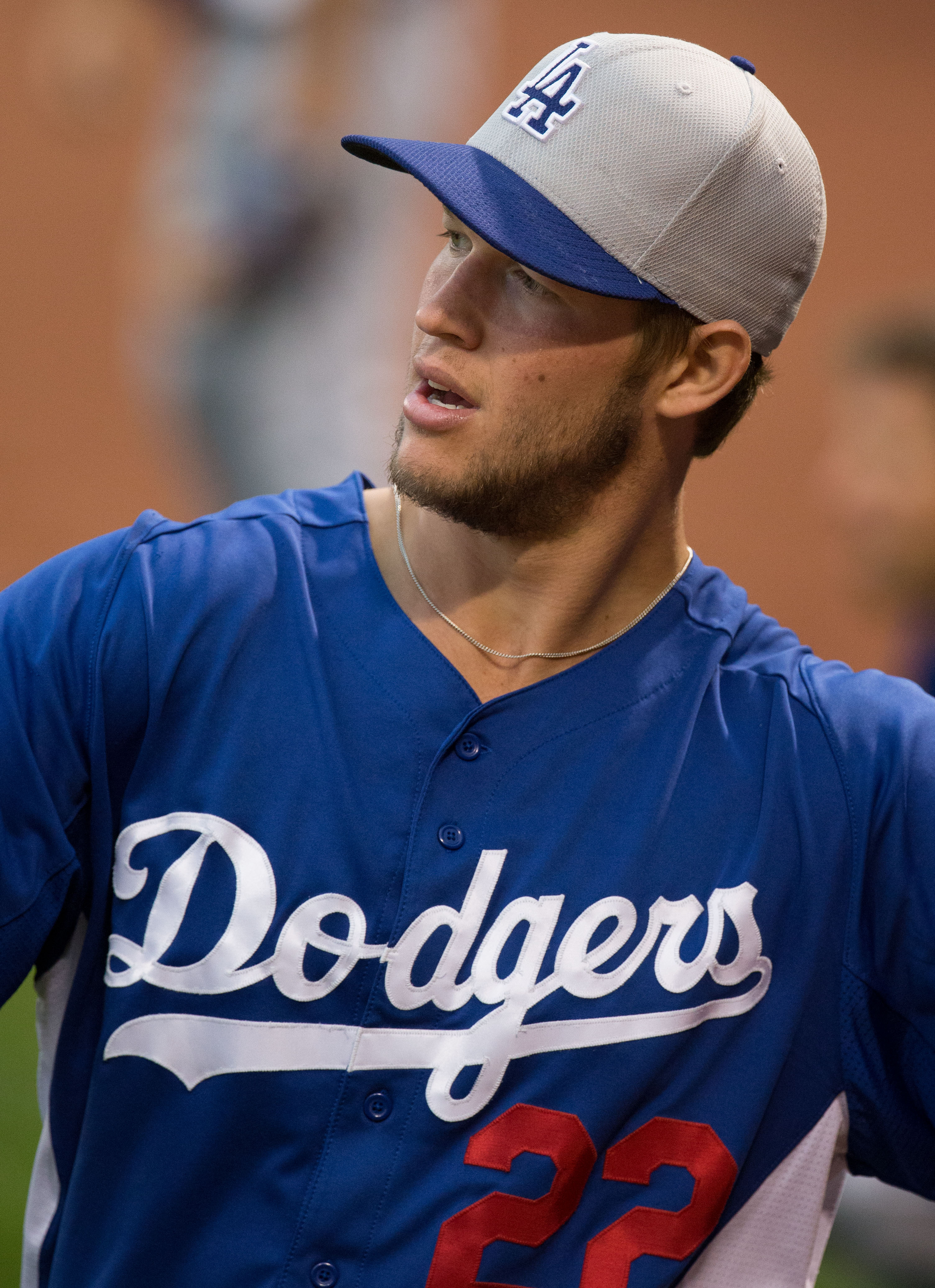
Clayton Kershaw

The Dodgers selected 50 players in this draft. Of those, seven of them would eventually play Major League baseball. The Dodgers gained an extra first round pick and a supplemental first round pick as a result of losing pitcher Jeff Weaver to the Angels. They also lost their second and third round picks as a result of their signing free agents Rafael Furcal and Bill Mueller.

The top draft pick was left-handed pitcher Clayton Kershaw from Highland Park High School in University Park, Texas. Kershaw would win the 2014 NL MVP Award as well as three Cy Young Awards. He also pitched a no-hitter and led the league in ERA for four straight seasons. Debuting in the major leagues in 2008, Kershaw remained with the Dodgers organization through his entire MLB career until his retirement after the 2025 season and became an 11-time All-Star, the all-time franchise leader in strikeouts with 3,052 and two time World Series champion.

The other first round picks were right-handed pitcher Bryan Morris from Motlow State Community College and shortstop Preston Mattingly from Central High School. Morris was part of the Dodgers 2008 trade for Manny Ramirez and eventually made it to the Majors. Mattingly, the son of All-Star first baseman and later Dodgers manager Don Mattingly never panned out. He hit just .232 in 463 minor league games over six seasons before he was eventually released. He eventually joined the Philadelphia Phillies organization in a front office role, and was promoted to General Manager in 2025.

2006 draft picks

Round	Name	Position	School	Signed	Career span	Highest level
1	Clayton Kershaw	LHP	Highland Park High School	Yes	2006–2025	MLB
1	Bryan Morris	RHP	Motlow State Community College	Yes	2006–2017	MLB
1s	Preston Mattingly	SS	Central High School	Yes	2006–2011	A+
4	Kyle Orr	1B	Lambrick Park Secondary School	Yes	2007–2010	Rookie
5	Kyle Smit	RHP	Spanish Springs High School	Yes	2006–2011	AAA
6	Garrett White	LHP	University of Mississippi	Yes	2006–2008	A+
7	Jaime Ortiz	1B	Sam Alfonso de Ligorio	Yes	2006–2012	AA
8	Tommy Giles	OF	University of Miami	Yes	2006–2011	AA
9	Bridger Hunt	3B	University of Central Missouri	Yes	2006–2014	AA
10	Andy D'Alessio	1B	Clemson University	No; Giants-2007	2007–2010	AA
11	Justin Fuller	SS	Lewis–Clark State College	Yes	2006–2010	AAA
12	Paul Coleman	LHP	Pepperdine University	Yes	2006–2007	A
13	Nick Akins	SS	Los Angeles High School	Yes	2006–2013	A+
14	Alex White	RHP	D. H. Conley High School	No; Indians-2010	2010–2015	MLB
15	Griff Erickson	C	Westview High School	Yes	2007–2015	AAA
16	Justin Coats	SS	Texas High School	No		
17	Michael Rivera	2B	University of Tennessee	Yes	2006–2007	AAA
18	Joseph Jones	RHP	University of Portland	Yes	2006–2009	A+
19	Martin Beno	RHP	Mississippi Gulf Coast Community College	No; Nationals-2007	2007–2010	A+
20	Billy Bullock	RHP	Riverview High School	No; Twins-2009	2009–2013	AAA
21	Matt Berezay	OF	University of the Pacific	Yes	2006–2008	AA
22	Christopher Jensen	OF	University of California, Los Angeles	Yes	2006	A
23	Eric Thompson	RHP	Roseburg High School	Yes	2007–2010	AAA
24	John Martin	C	Emporia State University	Yes	2006–2010	Rookie
25	Esteban Lopez	C	University of Hawaii at Manoa	Yes	2006–2010	AAA
26	Kody Kaiser	2B	University of Oklahoma	No; Tigers-2007	2007–2011	AA
27	Anthony Casario	C	Overbrook Senior High School	No; White Sox-2009	2009	Rookie
28	Taylor Lewis	RHP	Canyon del Oro High School	No; Mariners-2008	2008–2010	A
29	Roberto Pérez	C	Eugenio Maria De Hostos High School	No; Indians-2009	2009–2025	MLB
30	Alexander Burkard	LHP	Milton High School	No; Angels-2010	2010–2014	A+
31	Jonathan Wilson	3B	St. Charles High School	No		
32	Jordan Kopycinski	C	St. Thomas High School	No		
33	Curt Bradley	2B	University of Northern Iowa	Yes	2007	Rookie
34	Luke Yoder	OF	Liberty High School	No; Red Sox-2010	2010	Rookie
35	Nick Buss	OF	San Diego Mesa College	No; Dodgers-2008	2008–2018	MLB
36	Robert Taylor	C	Laredo Community College	No; Marlins-2008	2008–2010	A+
37	Anthony Benner	3B	Southwestern College	No; Nationals-2007	2007	A-
38	Kameron Forte	C	Texas High School	No		
39	Jake Debus	LHP	Moraine Valley Community College	No		
40	Chris Jones	SS	Redan High School	No; Indians-2007	2007–2016	AAA
41	Todd McCraw	C	St. James High School	No		
42	Joe Dispensa	OF	St. Rita High School	No		
43	Jordan Chambless	RHP	Texas A&M University	No		
44	Aaron Barrett	RHP	Central High School	No; Nationals-2010	2010–2022	MLB
45	Greg Hendrix	LHP	North Atlanta High School	No	2011–2012	Ind
46	Ryan Aguayo	2B	Servite High School	No		
47	Brett Sowers	3B	Cherry Creek High School	No		
48	Tanner Biagini	3B	D. H. Conley High School	No; Rays-2010	2010–2011	A-
49	Paul Goldschmidt	1B	The Woodlands High School	No; Diamondbacks-2009	2009–present	MLB
50	Kurt Benton	RHP	West Stanley High School	No		
