= Justin Ruggiano =

American baseball player (born 1982)

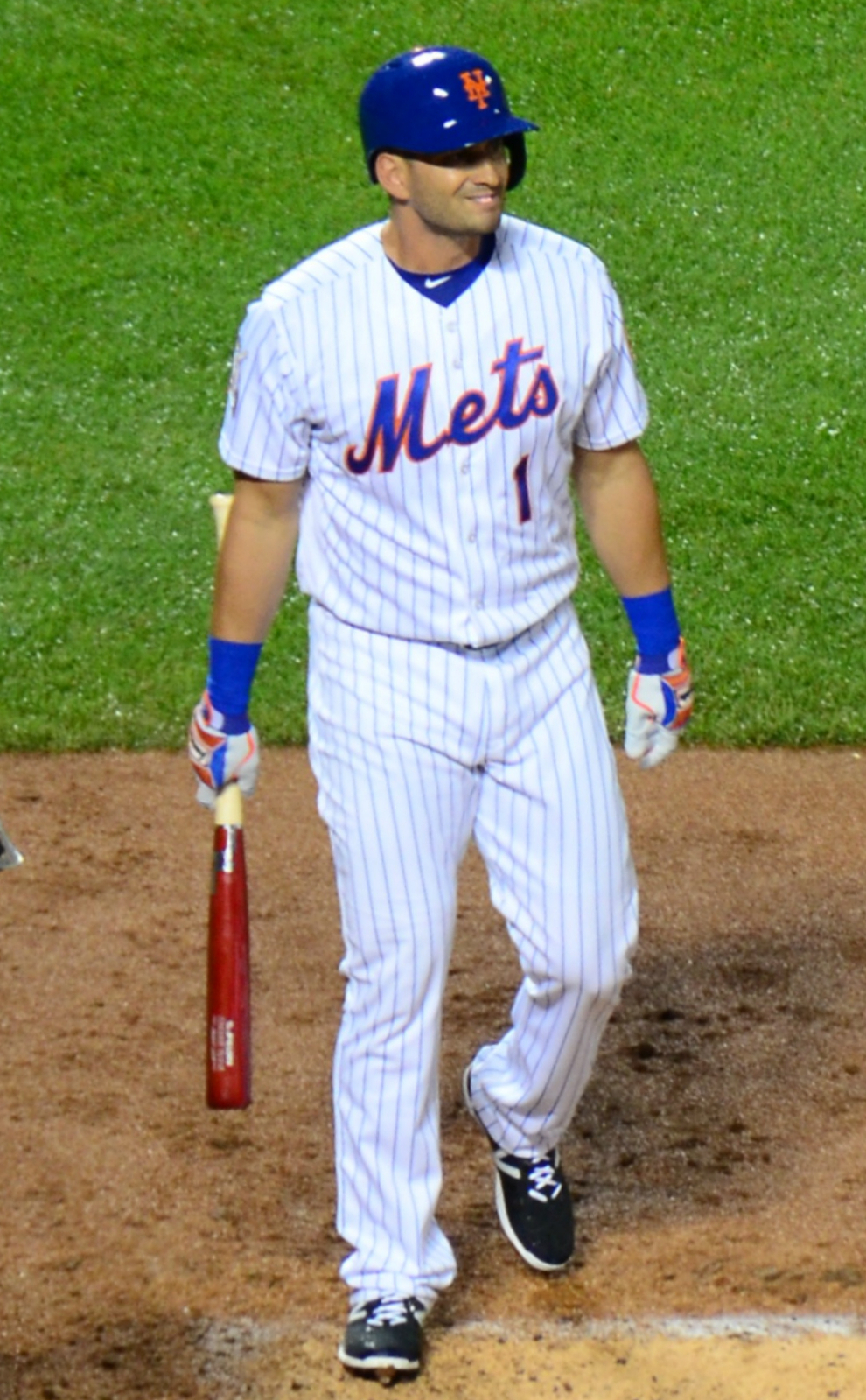
- Ruggiano with the New York Mets in 2016
- Outfielder
- Born: April 12, 1982 (age 44); Austin, Texas, U.S.
- Batted: Right Threw: Right

MLB debut
- September 19, 2007, for the Tampa Bay Devil Rays

Last MLB appearance
- May 30, 2017, for the San Francisco Giants

MLB statistics
- Batting average: .256
- Home runs: 53
- Runs batted in: 163
- Stats at Baseball Reference

Teams
- Tampa Bay Devil Rays / Rays (2007–2008, 2011); Miami Marlins (2012–2013); Chicago Cubs (2014); Seattle Mariners (2015); Los Angeles Dodgers (2015); Texas Rangers (2016); New York Mets (2016); San Francisco Giants (2017)
Medals
Men's baseball
Representing United States
Baseball World Cup
Gold medal – first place	2007 Tianmu	National team

Justin Marshall Ruggiano (born April 12, 1982) is an American former professional baseball outfielder. He played in Major League Baseball (MLB) for the Tampa Bay Devil Rays / Rays, Miami Marlins, Chicago Cubs, Seattle Mariners, Los Angeles Dodgers, Texas Rangers, New York Mets and San Francisco Giants.

== Career ==
=== Texas A&M ===
Ruggiano attended Texas A&M University, where he played college baseball for the Texas A&M Aggies baseball team.

=== Los Angeles Dodgers ===
The Los Angeles Dodgers drafted Ruggiano in the 25th round of the 2004 MLB draft. The Dodgers sent Ruggiano to the Tampa Bay Devil Rays in 2006, with Dioner Navarro and Jae Weong Seo for Toby Hall, Mark Hendrickson and cash.

=== Tampa Bay Devil Rays / Rays ===
Ruggiano made his Major League Baseball debut with the Tampa Bay Devil Rays in 2007. On October 19, 2007, Ruggiano was added to the roster of the United States national baseball team to play in the 2007 Baseball World Cup.

In 2008, he batted .197 for Tampa Bay in 76 at bats. Ruggiano hit his first career home run, a long ball to left field, on June 21, 2008 off of pitcher Wandy Rodriguez of the Houston Astros. Ruggiano became part of a historical play in the 2008 World Series when Rays manager Joe Maddon moved Ruggiano from right field to become a fifth infielder, playing directly behind the second base bag.

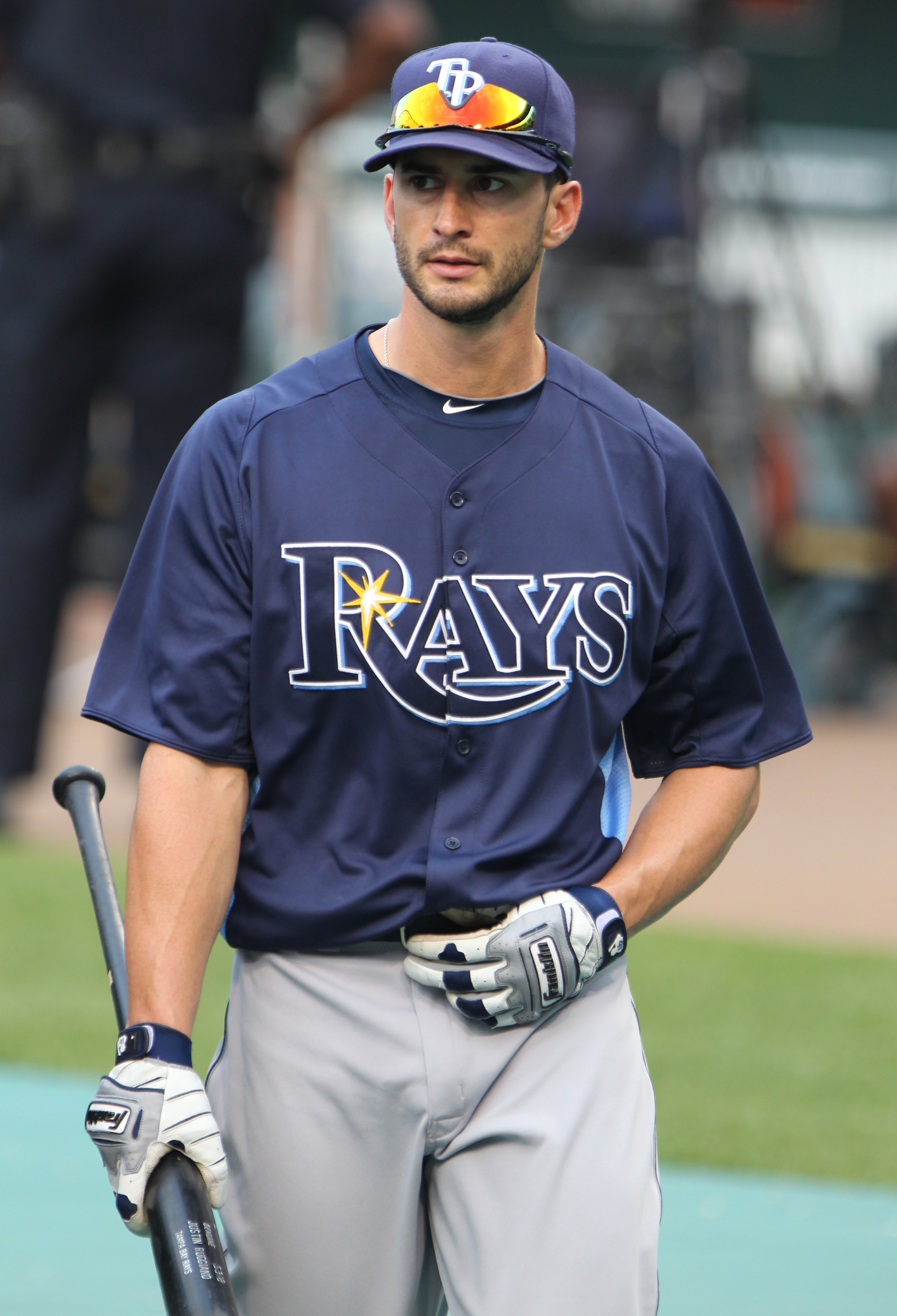
Ruggiano during his tenure with the Tampa Bay Rays in 2011

During the 2010–11 offseason, Ruggiano was designated for assignment. He was again designated for assignment after the 2011 season, and on January 30, 2012, elected free agency.

=== Houston Astros ===
On February 6, 2012, Ruggiano signed a minor league contract with the Houston Astros.

=== Miami Marlins ===
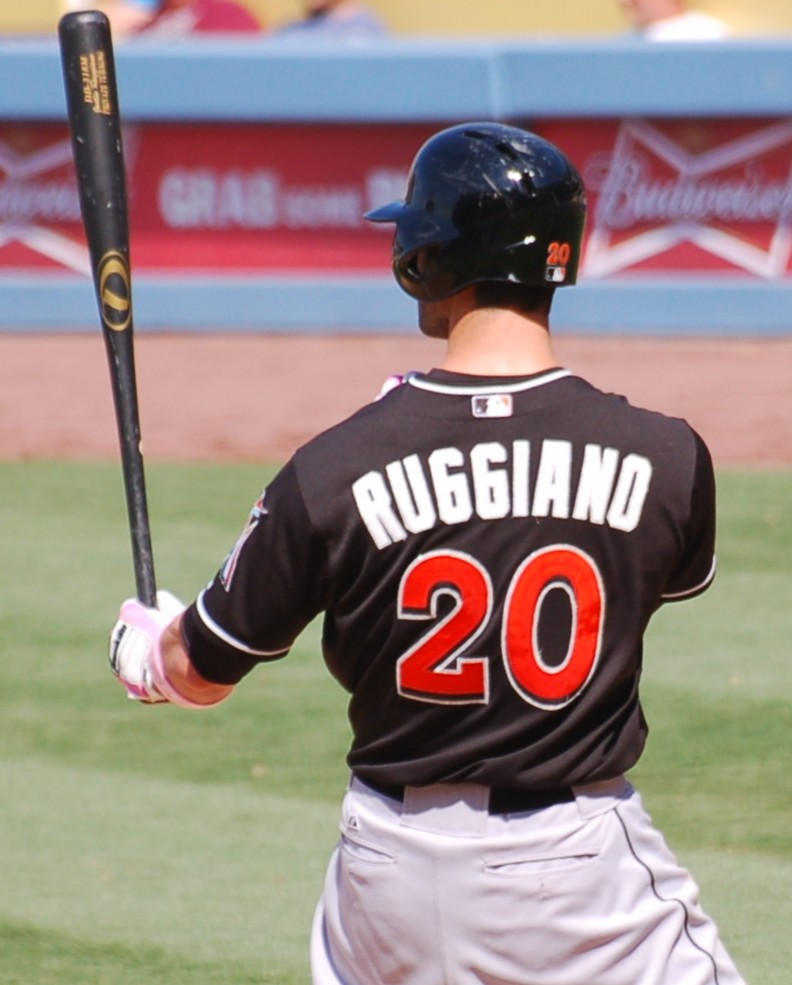
Ruggiano batting for the Miami Marlins in 2013

On May 26, 2012, Ruggiano was traded to the Miami Marlins for minor league catcher Jobduan Morales. He was called up to Miami the next day, and Kevin Mattison was optioned to Triple-A. After playing well in June, Ruggiano heated up in July. He ended the first half of the season with six home runs (four in the last six games), 17 RBI, and a batting average of .390. On September 21, Ruggiano injured his shoulder in the fifth inning in a game against the New York Mets. He finished the season batting .313 with 13 homers, 36 RBIs, 23 doubles, a .374 on-base percentage(OBP), and a .909 on-base slug percentage(OPS).

=== Chicago Cubs ===
On December 12, 2013, the Marlins traded Ruggiano to the Chicago Cubs for outfielder Brian Bogusevic. As a part-time outfielder during the 2014 season he played in 81 games before requiring surgery on his left ankle. Ruggiano finished the 2014 season hitting .281/.337/.429 in 224 at-bats, with six home runs and 28 RBIs.

=== Seattle Mariners ===
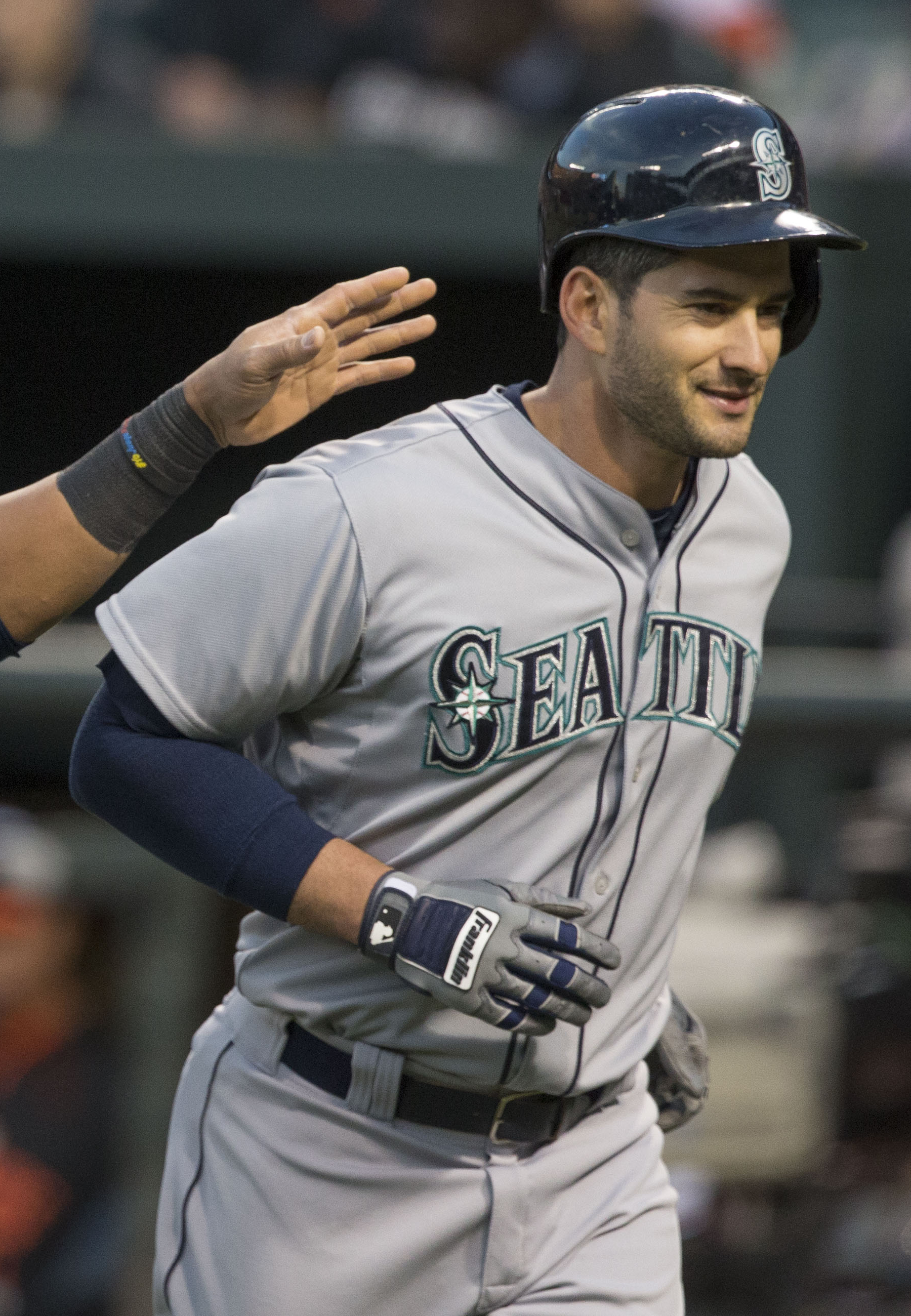
Ruggiano with the Seattle Mariners in 2015

On December 17, 2014, he was traded to the Seattle Mariners in exchange for minor leaguer Matt Brazis. He was designated for assignment on June 4, 2015. He cleared waivers and was assigned outright to the class AAA Tacoma Rainiers.

=== Los Angeles Dodgers ===
On August 31, 2015, he was traded to the Los Angeles Dodgers for cash considerations, and on September 1 was added to the active roster. He played in 21 games for the Dodgers in September (mostly starting against left handed pitching) and hit .291 with four homers and 12 RBI. On November 5, he was outrighted to the minors and removed from the 40 man roster. On November 6, he chose to become a free agent rather than accept an assignment to the minors.

=== Texas Rangers ===
On December 17, 2015, Ruggiano signed a one-year deal with the Texas Rangers. Ruggiano made the Rangers opening day roster with the initial plan of Ruggiano platooning with outfielder Josh Hamilton. Ruggiano started opening day for the Rangers going 1-for-4 with a double and an RBI. After the first game of the season, the Rangers designated Ruggiano for assignment. He was outrighted to the Triple–A Round Rock Express afterwards. He was released on July 26, 2016.

=== New York Mets ===
On July 30, 2016, the Mets signed Ruggiano to their 25-man roster to replace the injured José Reyes After only six plate appearances with the Mets, Ruggiano was placed on the disabled list with a left hamstring strain. On August 18, Ruggiano returned from the disabled list. After appearing in five games and hitting two home runs, including a grand slam off of Madison Bumgarner, Ruggiano was placed on the disabled list again with a shoulder injury.

=== San Francisco Giants ===
On December 23, 2016, Ruggiano signed a minor league contract with the San Francisco Giants. On May 6, 2017, after playing for the Sacramento River Cats for a month, San Francisco purchased Ruggiano's contract, promoting him to the Giants. On June 2, Ruggiano was designated for assignment when Austin Slater was called up from Triple-A Sacramento. He cleared waivers and reported to Triple-A Sacramento. On July 25, Ruggiano opted out of his minor league deal with the Giants.

Ruggiano retired in the offseason to become a hitting instructor for younger players at his home in Sunnyvale, Texas.

== Personal life ==
As of February 2016, Ruggiano and his wife, Shelly, lived in Heath, Texas with their children. Following the late December 2015 North American storm complex, Ruggiano and his wife volunteered via their church to help in the recovery effort.

Ruggiano's brother, Brian, also played baseball for Texas A&M and, like Justin, was drafted by the Los Angeles Dodgers (in the 23rd round of the 2008 MLB draft). A catcher in college, Brian played infield and outfield for four years in minor and independent baseball, spending the 2010 season with the Great Lakes Loons of the Class A Midwest League.
