= Tim Hamulack =

American baseball player (born 1976)

- Pitcher
- Born: November 14, 1976 (age 49); Ithaca, New York, U.S.
- Batted: Right Threw: Left

MLB debut
- September 2, 2005, for the New York Mets

Last MLB appearance
- September 16, 2006, for the Los Angeles Dodgers

MLB statistics
- Win–loss record: 0–3
- Earned run average: 7.43
- Strikeouts: 36
- Stats at Baseball Reference

Teams
- New York Mets (2005); Los Angeles Dodgers (2006)

Timothy Wm. Alexander Hamulack (born November 14, 1976) is an American former professional baseball pitcher. Hamulack is 6' 4" and weighs 220 pounds. He throws left-handed.

== Professional career ==
He was drafted in the 32nd round of the 1995 Major League Baseball draft by the Houston Astros out of Edgewood, Maryland High School, and he pitched within their system from 1996–2003, at which point he left as a minor league free agent to join the Boston Red Sox organization. There he posted an ERA of 3.52 at Double-A Portland and 6.98 with Triple-A Pawtucket. Boston let him walk after the 2004 minor league campaign, at which point he signed on with the New York Mets as a minor league free agent.

In the Mets organization in 2005, he put up extraordinary numbers throughout the minor leagues with a 1.26 ERA in 21 games at Double-A Binghamton and a 1.02 ERA in 28 games at Triple-A Norfolk.

He made his big-league debut on September 2, 2005, when the Mets played the Florida Marlins. He pitched in six games in 2005 and posted an ERA of 23.14.

On January 4, 2006, Hamulack found himself a part of his fourth organization in four years, as he was dealt from the Mets to the Los Angeles Dodgers along with Jae Weong Seo in exchange for relievers Steve Schmoll and Duaner Sánchez.

On January 17, 2008, he signed a minor league deal with the Kansas City Royals. He pitched at Double-A Northwest Arkansas in 2008.

He pitched in the Atlantic League of Professional Baseball in 2009 and 2010 with the Lancaster Barnstormers. On March 4, 2011, he signed another contract with the Barnstormers. Hamulack was their closer in 2010 and again in 2011.

Hamulack signed a minor league contract with the Cincinnati Reds on June 1, 2011.
