= Steve Schmoll =

American baseball player (born 1980)

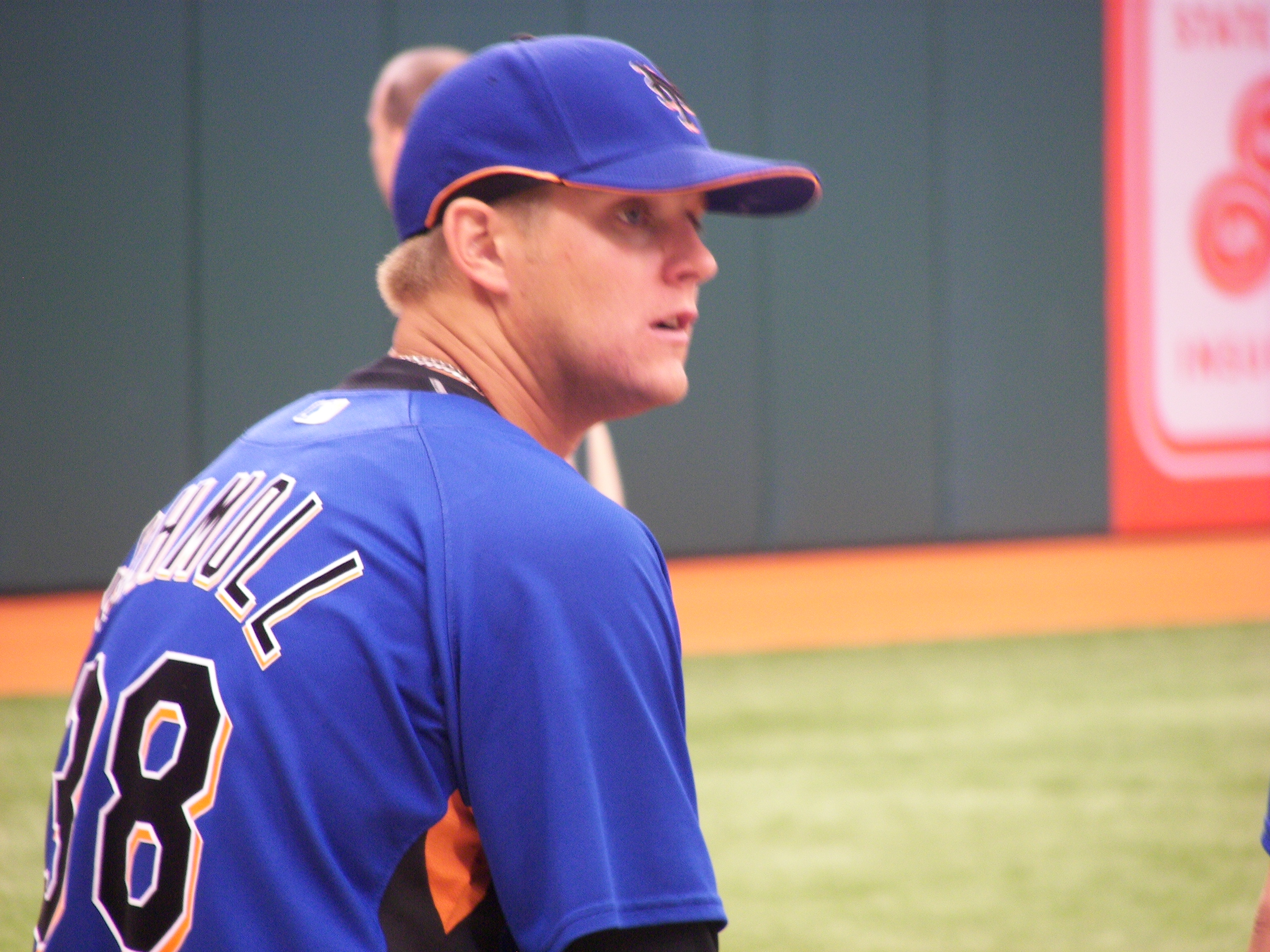
- Relief pitcher
- Born: February 4, 1980 (age 45); Silver Spring, Maryland, U.S.
- Batted: Right Threw: Right

MLB debut
- April 6, 2005, for the Los Angeles Dodgers

Last MLB appearance
- October 2, 2005, for the Los Angeles Dodgers

MLB statistics
- Win–loss record: 2–2
- Earned run average: 5.01
- Strikeouts: 29
- Stats at Baseball Reference

Former teams
- Los Angeles Dodgers (2005)

Stephen John Schmoll (born February 4, 1980) is a former Major League Baseball pitcher. He bats and throws right-handed.

Schmoll graduated from the University of Maryland, College Park. In 2000, he played for the Bethesda Big Train. He pitched for the Los Angeles Dodgers in 2005. On January 4, 2006, the Dodgers traded Schmoll and Duaner Sánchez to the New York Mets for Jae Seo and Tim Hamulack.

Schmoll signed with the Washington Nationals for the 2008 season after being released by the Mets in spring training. He spent the entire year with the Harrisburg Senators, and he has not pitched since.
