= Dioner Navarro =

Venezuelan baseball player (born 1984)

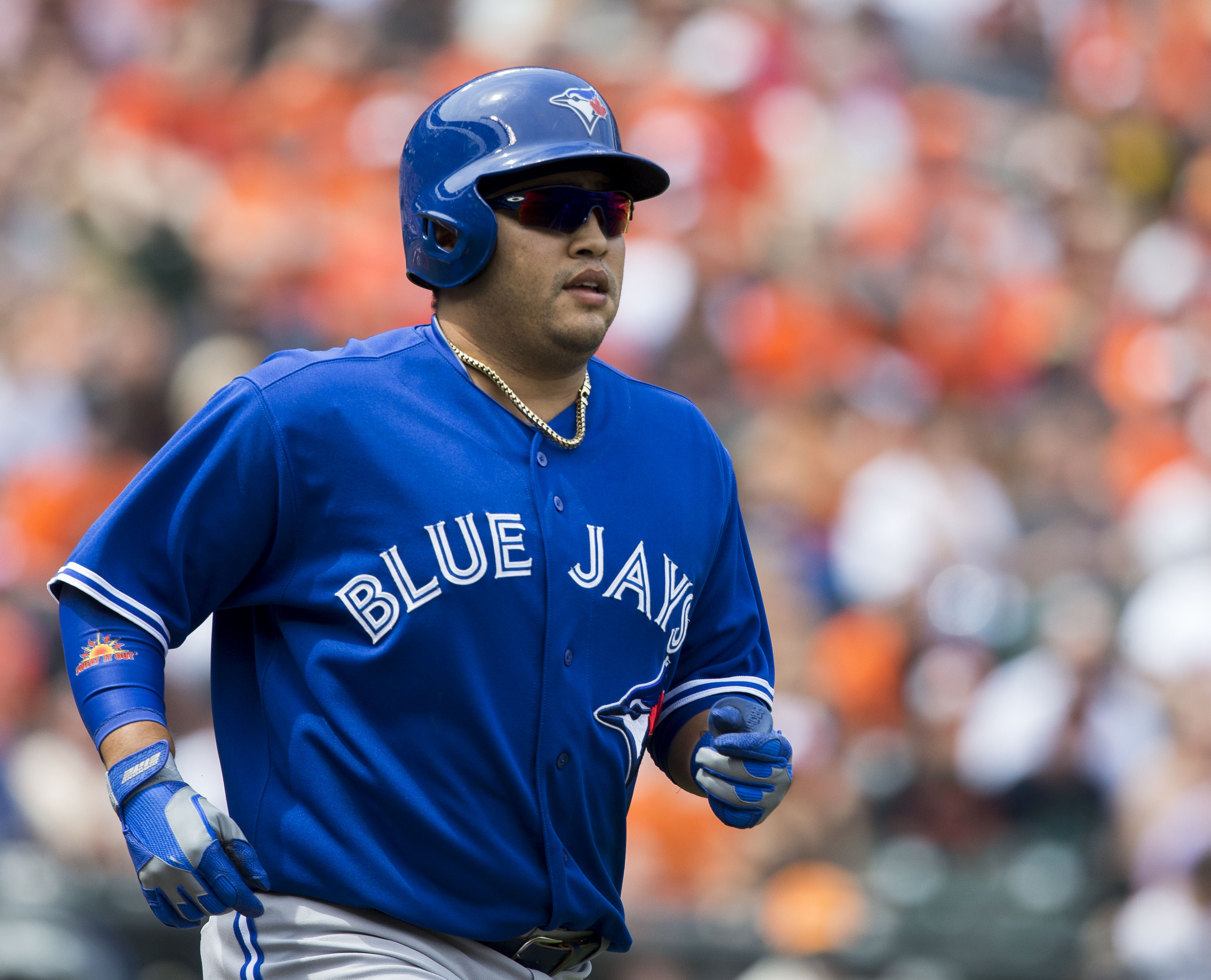
- Navarro with the Toronto Blue Jays in 2014
- Catcher
- Born: February 9, 1984 (age 42); Caracas, Venezuela
- Batted: Switch Threw: Right

MLB debut
- September 7, 2004, for the New York Yankees

Last MLB appearance
- September 30, 2016, for the Toronto Blue Jays

MLB statistics
- Batting average: .250
- Home runs: 77
- Runs batted in: 367
- Stats at Baseball Reference

Teams
- New York Yankees (2004); Los Angeles Dodgers (2005–2006); Tampa Bay Devil Rays / Rays (2006–2010); Los Angeles Dodgers (2011); Cincinnati Reds (2012); Chicago Cubs (2013); Toronto Blue Jays (2014–2015); Chicago White Sox (2016); Toronto Blue Jays (2016)

Career highlights and awards
- All-Star (2008)

Dioner Favian Navarro Vivas (born February 9, 1984) is a Venezuelan former professional baseball catcher. He played in Major League Baseball (MLB) for the New York Yankees, Los Angeles Dodgers, Tampa Bay Rays, Cincinnati Reds, Chicago Cubs, Chicago White Sox and Toronto Blue Jays. With the Rays, Navarro was an All-Star in 2008.

== Professional career ==
=== New York Yankees ===
On August 21, 2000, Navarro was signed by the New York Yankees as an amateur free agent. He made his professional debut in 2001 with the GCL Yankees, batting .280 in 43 games. In 2002, Navarro split the season between the Single-A Greensboro Bats and the High-A Tampa Yankees, accumulating a .239/.327/.361 slash line with 8 home runs and 36 RBI. In 2003, with the Double-A Trenton Thunder, he hit .341 in 58 games and was selected as the Yankees minor league player of the year and was the top-ranked prospect in the Yankees organization heading into 2004. He was assigned to the Double-A Trenton Thunder to begin the 2004 season before receiving a promotion to the Triple-A Columbus Clippers later in the year.

Navarro made his Major League debut with the Yankees on September 7, 2004, playing against the Tampa Bay Devil Rays, and played in seven games, batting .429 (3-for-7) with one RBIs and two runs scored.

=== Los Angeles Dodgers ===
On January 11, 2005, Navarro was traded to the Arizona Diamondbacks with Javier Vázquez and Brad Halsey in exchange for Randy Johnson. That same day, the Diamondbacks traded Navarro, Beltrán Pérez, Danny Muegge, and William Juarez to the Los Angeles Dodgers in exchange for Shawn Green. Navarro split the 2005 season between the Triple-A Las Vegas 51s and the Dodgers, batting .273 with 3 home runs and 14 RBI in 50 games with the big league club.

In 2006, both Navarro and Russell Martin were invited to spring training to compete for the starting catcher position. Both played well, but at the end of the spring Navarro was named the Dodgers' catcher, and Martin was sent to Triple-A. However, while Martin thrived in Las Vegas, Navarro played only adequately in Los Angeles, and showed signs of inexperience. On May 5, 2006, Martin was called up to the Dodgers after a wrist injury landed Navarro on the disabled list. Martin played well after the injury to Navarro, and kept the job as catcher, as Navarro was demoted to the minor leagues. In 25 games with the Dodgers in 2006, Navarro logged a .280/.372/.387 slash with 2 home runs and 8 RBI.

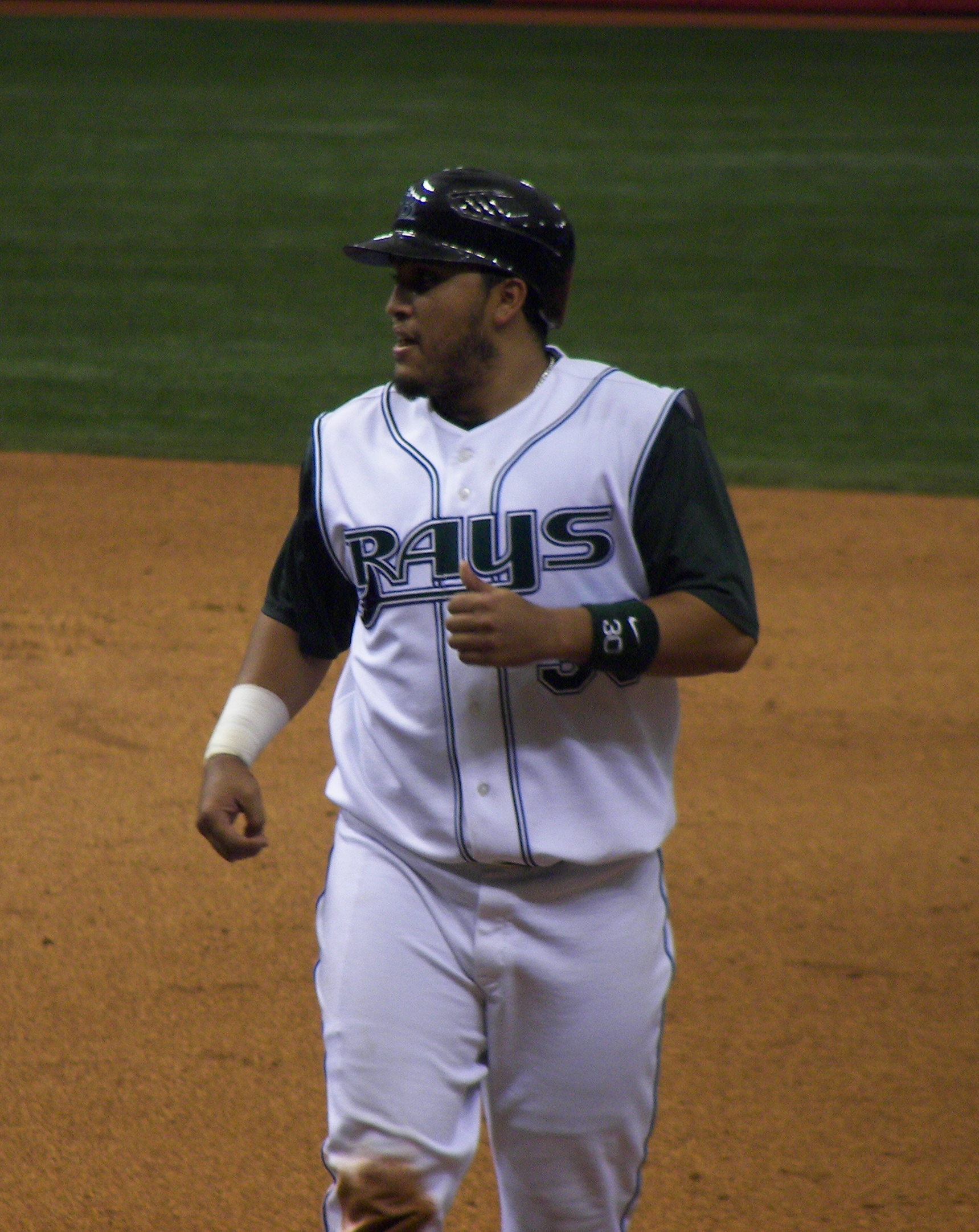
Navarro with the Tampa Bay Devil Rays in 2007

=== Tampa Bay Rays ===
On June 26, 2006, Navarro was traded along with pitcher Jae Seo and outfielder Justin Ruggiano to the Tampa Bay Devil Rays in exchange for catcher Toby Hall and pitcher Mark Hendrickson. Navarro made his debut as a Ray on June 28, 2006, against the Florida Marlins going hitless with two walks. In 2007, he batted only .227 and tied for the lead of all Major League catchers in errors, with 14.

Navarro was much improved in 2008, after working on his hitting and his strength in the Venezuelan Winter League with Tiburones de La Guaira, leading his team with a .295 batting average and guiding his pitchers to the third-lowest ERA in the majors (3.60) as of July 10. On July 6, it was announced that Navarro was selected to be on the American League squad for the 2008 MLB All-Star Game. He finished the year with a .295/.349/.407 slash with 7 home runs and 54 RBI in 120 games. During the 2008 offseason, Navarro went to arbitration with the Rays; he lost and was given $2.1 million. In 2009, Navarro slashed .218/.261/.322 with 8 home runs and 32 RBI. Of all AL players with at least 350 plate appearances in 2009, only one had a lower OBP, two had a lower AVG, and two had a lower SLG.

Navarro's batting average continued to slide in 2010, resulting in the loss of playing time to John Jaso and Kelly Shoppach. Shortly after the latter returned from injury, Navarro was sent to the Rays' Triple-A team, Durham Bulls, having cleared waivers because of service time. On December 2, 2010, Navarro became a free agent.

=== Los Angeles Dodgers (second stint) ===
On December 14, 2010, Navarro signed a one-year contract to return to the Dodgers for the 2011 season. He began the season on the disabled list due to an injury suffered in spring training and did not join the Dodgers until April 25. Three times during the season (June 19, July 9, and July 20), he drove in the sole run in a 1–0 victory, which only happened once before (Gary Sheffield in 2001) in Los Angeles Dodger history. Navarro was designated for assignment by the Dodgers on August 23, 2011. In 64 games, he batted .193 with five home runs and 17 runs batted in. He was released on August 30.

=== Cincinnati Reds ===
On January 16, 2012, Navarro signed a minor league contract, containing a spring training invite, with the Cincinnati Reds organization. He was assigned to the Triple-A Louisville Bats. Navarro was called up on August 1, due to the injury and suspension of Devin Mesoraco. Navarro hit .290 with 2 home runs and 12 RBI in 24 games for Cincinnati. He became a free agent following the season.

=== Chicago Cubs ===
On November 15, 2012, Navarro signed a one-year, $1.75 million deal with the Chicago Cubs, worth up to $250K in performance bonuses. On May 29, 2013, Navarro walked once, hit three home runs, scored four runs, and totaled six RBI to lead the Cubs to a 9–3 victory over the crosstown rival Chicago White Sox at Wrigley Field. It was Navarro's first multi-HR game in his Major League career and included home runs from both sides of the plate. He finished the year with a .300/.365/.492 slash line paired with 13 home runs and 34 RBI.

=== Toronto Blue Jays ===
On December 2, 2013, Navarro agreed to a two-year, $8 million deal with the Toronto Blue Jays. The official announcement came later that day. He was placed on the bereavement list on May 14, due to a family medical emergency. On August 23, Navarro recorded his 55th RBI of the season, establishing a new career-high. He would go on to start 102 games behind the plate and appear in 139 games in 2014, both career-highs, and record just 3 errors. Navarro finished the season batting .274 with 12 home runs and 69 RBI.

After the offseason signing of Russell Martin, Navarro was demoted to backup catcher to open the 2015 season. He requested a trade shortly after the Blue Jays signed Martin, specifically to a team where he could be the starting catcher, but a trade was not completed by the start of the season. On April 23, Navarro was placed on the 15-day disabled list with a strained left hamstring. He completed a rehab assignment with the Buffalo Bisons and was activated from the disabled list on June 2. Navarro appeared in 54 games in the 2015 regular season, and hit .246 with 5 home runs and 20 RBI. He had the second-slowest baserunning sprint speed of all major league players, at 22.5 feet/second.

=== Chicago White Sox ===
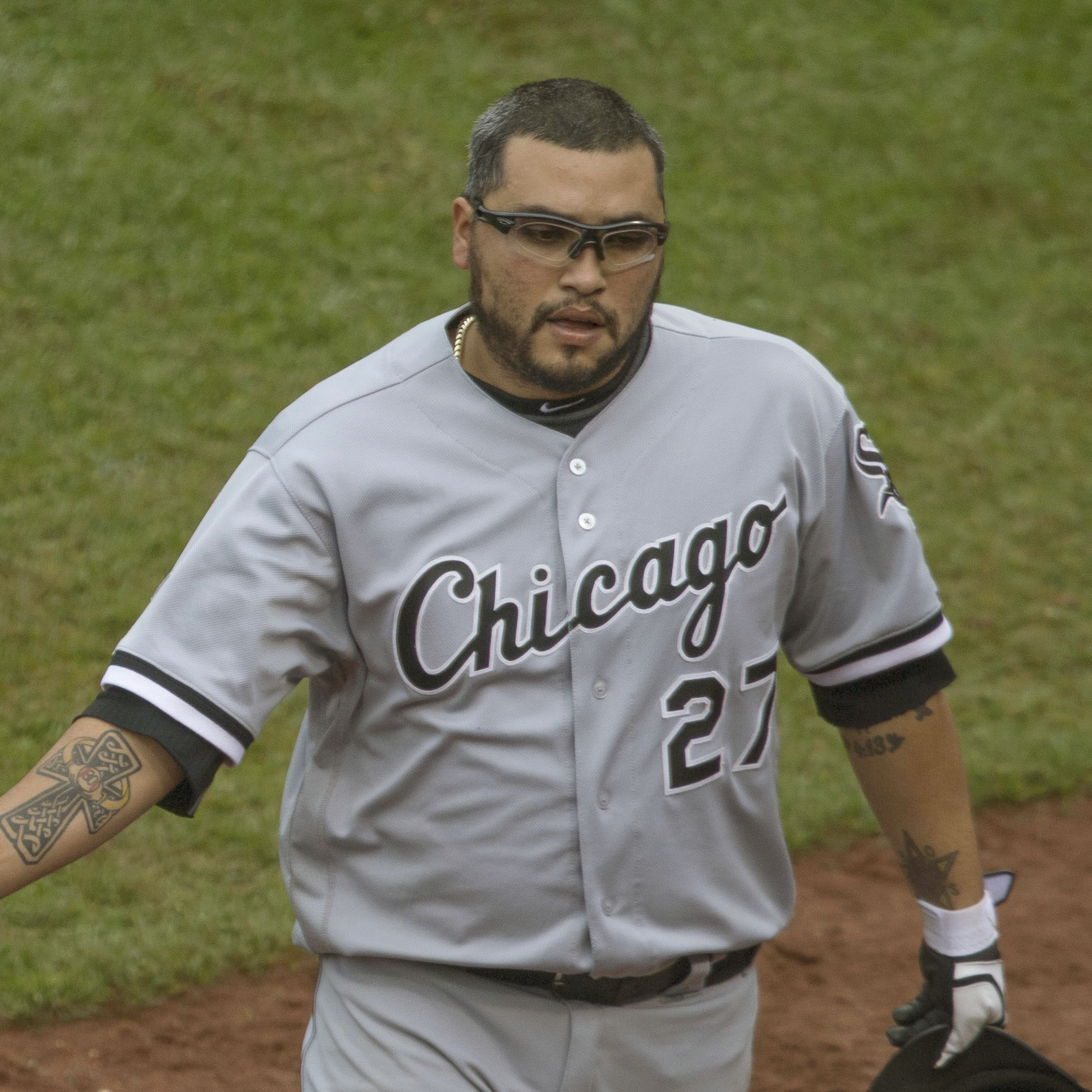
Navarro with the Chicago White Sox in 2016

On December 4, 2015, Navarro signed a one-year, $4 million deal with the Chicago White Sox. Navarro played in 85 games for the White Sox in 2016, batting .210 with 6 home runs and 32 RBI.

=== Toronto Blue Jays (second stint) ===
On August 26, 2016, Navarro was traded back to the Toronto Blue Jays in exchange for minor league pitcher Colton Turner. Navarro played in 16 games with the Blue Jays in 2016, hitting .182 with three RBI. On November 3, he became a free agent.

=== Long Island Ducks ===
Navarro did not play in a game in 2017, after helping his wife through "significant health issues". On July 31, 2018, Navarro signed with the Long Island Ducks of the Atlantic League of Professional Baseball. In 20 games with the Ducks, Navarro slashed .268/.299/.437 with 3 home runs and 13 RBI. He became a free agent following the 2018 season.

=== Cleveland Indians ===
On February 7, 2019, Navarro signed a minor league contract with the Cleveland Indians. He was assigned to the Triple-A Columbus Clippers, and spent the season with the team, batting .211/.339/.274 with 1 home run and 11 RBI in 30 games. On September 30, Navarro was released by the Indians organization.

== Coaching Career ==
In 2026, he was named as a coach for the Rancho Cucamonga Quakes the Single-A affiliate of the Los Angeles Angels.

== Personal life ==
Navarro was born in Caracas, Venezuela, and married his wife, Sherley, at age 18; they have a son, Dioner Jr. (born 2005), and she has a son, Gerson, from a previous relationship. They have lived in the Tampa Bay Area during offseasons since he was drafted and first signed by the Yankees, and currently live in Riverview, Florida.

On September 27, 2003, their first wedding anniversary, Sherley suffered a cerebral aneurysm in Tampa. Doctors gave her less than a 5% chance of surviving surgery, and said it was likely she would die on September 30. She survived, and made a full recovery. Navarro has worn the #30 in her honor ever since.

On July 5, 2006, days after his acquisition by the Devil Rays, Navarro's SUV was clipped by another vehicle, causing his SUV to roll over. He and his family escaped serious injury, but the other vehicle fled the scene.

His son, Dioner Jr., was born with multicystic dysplastic kidney. He needed to have one of his kidneys removed in September 2006, and further surgery in 2007.

His mother, who still resides in Venezuela, suffered a cerebral aneurysm in early February 2008. Navarro left the Rays' pre-spring training workouts to be with her and returned when her condition stabilized.

Navarro is an animal lover who has five pets: Lilo (a French Bulldog), Crystal (English Bulldog), a chameleon called Jeffrey, and two birds that do not have names.

== See also ==
- List of Major League Baseball players from Venezuela
