= Toby Hall =

American baseball player (born 1975)

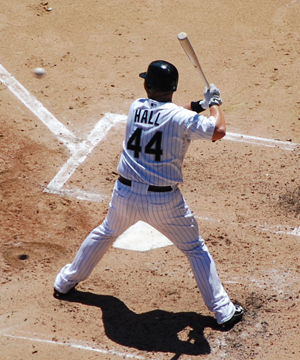
- Hall with the Chicago White Sox in 2008

Florence Y'alls
- Catcher / Coach
- Born: October 21, 1975 (age 50); Tacoma, Washington, U.S.
- Batted: Right Threw: Right

MLB debut
- September 15, 2000, for the Tampa Bay Devil Rays

Last MLB appearance
- September 21, 2008, for the Chicago White Sox

MLB statistics
- Batting average: .262
- Home runs: 46
- Runs batted in: 269
- Stats at Baseball Reference

Teams
- Tampa Bay Devil Rays (2000–2006); Los Angeles Dodgers (2006); Chicago White Sox (2007–2008)

Toby Jason Hall (born October 21, 1975) is an American professional baseball coach and former catcher who is the manager of the Florence Y'alls of the Frontier League. He played in Major League Baseball (MLB) from 2000 to 2008, primarily with the Tampa Bay Devil Rays. Listed at 6 feet 3 inches (1.91 m) and 205 pounds (93 kg), he batted and threw right-handed.

== Career ==
Hall attended El Dorado High School in Placerville, California, where he earned All-State honors. The first time he played catcher was in his sophomore year at American River College. Then while in college he was an All-American at UNLV. The San Francisco Giants selected Hall in the 24th round (663rd overall) of the 1995 MLB draft, but he did not sign.

=== Tampa Bay Devil Rays ===
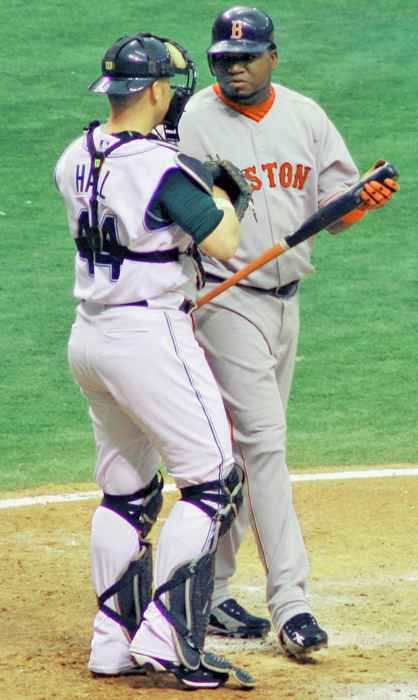
Hall with David Ortiz of the Boston Red Sox in 2006

Hall was selected in the ninth round (294th overall) of the 1997 MLB draft by the Tampa Bay Devil Rays and signed with the team. He rose through their minor league farm system, starting in Class A Short Season in 1997 and reaching Triple-A in 2000. He made his MLB debut with the Devil Rays late in the 2000 season, appearing in four games while batting .167 (2-for-12). In 2001 and 2002, he appeared in 49 and 85 games with Tampa Bay, batting .298 and .258, respectively. From 2003 through 2005, he played in over 100 games each season with the team, batting a career-high .287 in 2005. He appeared in 64 games with the Devil Rays in 2006, batting .231 with eight home runs and 23 RBI.

Overall, Hall appeared in 586 games with Tampa Bay, batting .262 with 44 home runs and 251 RBIs. Hall holds a number of top ten team records for Tampa Bay; as of 2022, he is tied with Aubrey Huff for seventh in sacrifice flies (26), ranks eighth in doubles (112), ninth in games played (586), and tenth in at bats (2,050), RBI (251), and hits (538).

=== Los Angeles Dodgers ===
On June 27, 2006, Hall and pitcher Mark Hendrickson were traded to the Los Angeles Dodgers for pitcher Jae Seo, catcher Dioner Navarro, and outfielder Justin Ruggiano. In 21 games with the Dodgers, Hall batted .368 (21-for-57) with 8 RBI.

=== Chicago White Sox ===
On December 17, 2006, Hall agreed to a two-year, $3.65 million deal with a club option for 2009 with the Chicago White Sox. He served as the backup to A. J. Pierzynski. On July 4, 2007, Hall collected his first RBI of the season and his first as a member of the White Sox organization. In two seasons with Chicago, Hall appeared in a total of 79 games, batting .235 with two home runs and 10 RBIs.

=== Late career ===
On October 30, 2008, the White Sox declined a $2.25 million option on Hall, making him a free agent. He signed a minor league contract with the Houston Astros on January 14, 2009, and was invited to spring training. On February 22, 2009, Hall elected to undergo shoulder surgery, which enabled the Astros to void his deal. Hall did not play professionally during the 2009 season.

On January 22, 2010, Hall signed a minor league contract with the Texas Rangers with an invitation to spring training. On June 24, 2010, Hall was released. Other than playing in one minor league game with Texas, Hall did not play professionally during the 2010 season.

On March 10, 2011, Hall signed with the Camden Riversharks of the independent Atlantic League of Professional Baseball. He appeared in 93 games with Camden, batting .255 with two home runs and 32 RBI. On December 20, 2011, Hall retired from baseball as a player.

== Coaching career ==
In 2025, Hall was named as interim manager of the Windy City ThunderBolts of the Frontier League.

On November 14, 2025, he was announced as manager of the Florence Y'alls of the same league.

== Personal life ==
Hall has a tendency to dye his soul patch different colors to mark specific occasions. For example, during a 12-game winning streak in 2004, he dyed his soul patch platinum blonde. On June 24, 2006, Hall dyed his soul patch red to mark "turn back the clock night", where Tampa Bay wore throwback uniforms for the Tampa Tarpons, a Cincinnati Reds minor-league affiliate.

In May 2005, Hall sponsored a Make-a-Wish for Chase Troche.
