= Duaner Sánchez =

Dominican baseball player (born 1979)

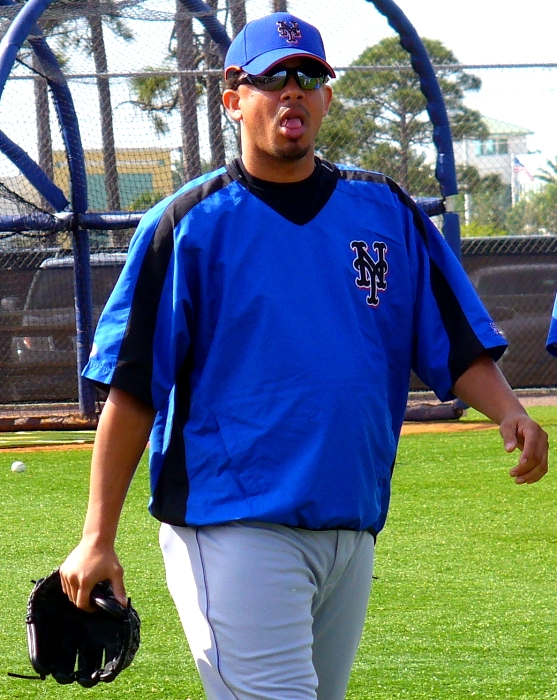
- Sánchez with the New York Mets
- Relief pitcher
- Born: October 14, 1979 (age 46); Cotuí, Dominican Republic
- Batted: Right Threw: Right

MLB debut
- June 14, 2002, for the Arizona Diamondbacks

Last MLB appearance
- May 14, 2009, for the San Diego Padres

MLB statistics
- Win–loss record: 19–11
- Earned run average: 4.10
- Strikeouts: 214
- Stats at Baseball Reference

Teams
- Arizona Diamondbacks (2002); Pittsburgh Pirates (2002–2003); Los Angeles Dodgers (2004–2005); New York Mets (2006, 2008); San Diego Padres (2009)

Duaner Sánchez (born October 14, 1979) is a Dominican former professional baseball player. He is a right-handed relief pitcher. During his Major League Baseball (MLB) career, Sánchez pitched for Arizona Diamondbacks, Pittsburgh Pirates, Los Angeles Dodgers, New York Mets and San Diego Padres. He is known for his distinctive sports goggles he wears while pitching.

== Career ==
Sánchez was born October 14, 1979, in Cotuí, Dominican Republic. In 1996, Sánchez graduated from Francisco E. Carvajal High School.

=== Arizona Diamondbacks ===
In 1997, he was signed as an amateur free agent by the Arizona Diamondbacks and began his professional career in the Dominican Summer League.

On June 14, 2002, he made his major league debut, pitching a scoreless inning against the Detroit Tigers.

=== Pittsburgh Pirates ===
Three weeks later, he was traded to the Pittsburgh Pirates for pitcher Mike Fetters.

In 2003, he spent most of the season with the Triple-A Nashville Sounds. In 2002 and 2003, Sánchez made 15 appearances with one win and a 12.75 ERA.

=== Los Angeles Dodgers ===
After the 2003 season, he was claimed off waivers by the Los Angeles Dodgers. In 2004, he began to achieve success, working 80 innings in 67 games with a 3.38 ERA.

In August 2005, he became the Dodgers temporary closer, earning eight saves while Éric Gagné remained on the disabled list.

=== New York Mets ===
In January 2006, the Los Angeles Dodgers traded Sánchez to the New York Mets along with Steve Schmoll in exchange for Jae Weong Seo and Tim Hamulack. Sánchez started 2006 by throwing 18 scoreless innings in 15 games while setting up for Mets closer Billy Wagner.

In the early morning hours on July 30, 2006, less than 24 hours prior to the 2006 trading deadline, Sanchez was injured in a taxicab accident in Miami, Florida on Interstate 95; the accident was caused by a drunk driver. Sanchez suffered a separated shoulder, and was flown to New York City to undergo season-ending surgery. The Mets front office learned about the full extent of the injury early on the morning of the trading deadline, although then suppressed what had transpired until a trade had been made with the Pittsburgh Pirates where the Mets re-acquired fellow relief pitcher Roberto Hernández, and starting pitcher Óliver Pérez, however, Sanchez, himself, was not involved in that trade.

In January 2007, Sanchez and the Mets agreed to a one-year, $850,000 contract for the 2007 season. Towards the end of Spring training in March 2007, Sanchez suffered a hairline fracture to a small bone (known as the coracoid) in the front of his shoulder. Although the injury was thought to be unrelated to the first injury caused during the taxicab accident, the accident likely weakened parts of the shoulder and the bone cracked when he started throwing again. Sanchez missed the entire 2007 season as a result of the fracture.

Sanchez was released by the Mets during Spring Training 2009. The Mets cited his lack of progress since his injury as the reason for his release.

=== San Diego Padres ===
On March 15, 2009, Sánchez signed a minor league contract with the San Diego Padres and was invited to spring training. He was released by the Padres on May 14.

=== Canada and Mexico ===
In 2010, Sanchez played for the Sussex Skyhawks of the Can-Am League and for the Diablos Rojos del México of the Mexican League.

=== Long Island Ducks ===
On April 11, 2011, the Long Island Ducks announced they signed Sanchez.
