= Jae Weong Seo =

South Korean baseball player (born 1977)

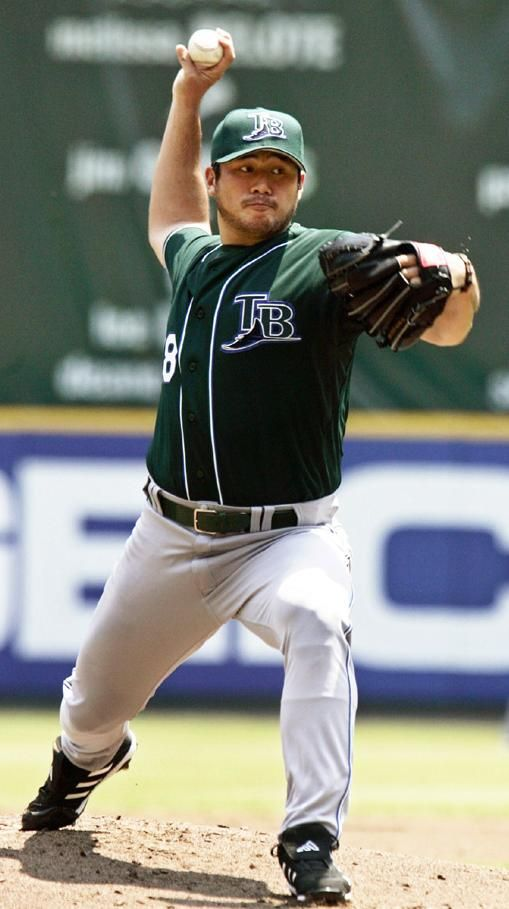
- Seo with the Tampa Bay Devil Rays

Kia Tigers – No. 98
- Pitcher / pitching coach
- Born: May 24, 1977 (age 48); Kwangju, South Korea
- Batted: Right Threw: Right

Professional debut
- MLB: July 21, 2002, for the New York Mets
- KBO: April 1, 2008, for the Kia Tigers

Last appearance
- MLB: May 29, 2007, for the Tampa Bay Devil Rays
- KBO: August 17, 2015, for the Kia Tigers

MLB statistics
- Win–loss record: 28–40
- Earned run average: 4.60
- Strikeouts: 340

KBO statistics
- Win–loss record: 42–48
- Earned run average: 4.30
- Strikeouts: 417
- Stats at Baseball Reference

Teams
- New York Mets (2002–2005); Los Angeles Dodgers (2006); Tampa Bay Devil Rays (2006–2007); Kia Tigers (2008–2015)

Career highlights and awards
- Korean Series champion (2009)
Medals
Men's baseball
Representing South Korea
World Baseball Classic
Bronze medal – third place	2006 San Diego	Team

- Jae Weong Seo
- Hangul: 서재응
- Hanja: 徐在應
- RR: Seo Jaeeung
- MR: Sŏ Chaeŭng

Jae Weong Seo (Korean: 서재응; Hanja: 徐在應; Korean pronunciation: [sʌ.dʑɛ̝.ɯŋ]; born May 24, 1977), usually referred to as simply Jae Seo and pronounced "Jay So", is a retired South Korean professional baseball pitcher. He played in Major League Baseball (MLB) for the New York Mets, Los Angeles Dodgers, and Tampa Bay Devil Rays. Seo subsequently returned to South Korea to join the KBO League's Kia Tigers.

== Career ==
Seo attended Gwangju Jeil High School (graduating in 1996), and Inha University in Incheon, South Korea, where he led his team to the Korean collegiate championship in 1997.

In 1998, Seo was signed as a free agent by the New York Mets. After an excellent first year of professional play, Seo underwent reconstructive surgery on his elbow in 1999. He did not pitch again until 2001. On July 21, 2002, Seo made his major league debut with a scoreless inning of relief against the Cincinnati Reds. In 2003, Seo spent the entire season with the Mets as a starting pitcher. He logged 188 innings pitched and 31 games started, both tops among rookie pitchers in the National League that year. In 2004, Seo struggled, splitting his time between the Mets and the Triple-A Norfolk Tides.

When he first pitched in the major leagues, he had two pitches – a fastball which topped out at 91–92 miles per hour (he threw in the mid-90s before Tommy John surgery), and a deceptive changeup in the mid 80s. Not being able to throw as hard as earlier in his career meant it was important for Seo to maintain a high degree of control over his pitches which, on occasion he was unable to do. This, along with Seo's reluctance to change his pitching mechanics, led to confrontations with Mets' pitching coach Rick Peterson.

In 2005, Seo seemed to have taken heed of this advice, developing a slider, splitter, and curveball. The Mets' surplus of pitchers resulted in his spending much of the year at Norfolk. However, he was called up to the majors in early August 2005, and pitched extremely well.

On January 4, 2006, Seo was dealt to the Los Angeles Dodgers along with Tim Hamulack in exchange for relievers Duaner Sánchez and Steve Schmoll. On June 26, he was traded by the Dodgers, along with catcher Dioner Navarro and outfielder Justin Ruggiano to the Tampa Bay Devil Rays in exchange for pitcher Mark Hendrickson and catcher Toby Hall. Seo made his debut with the Rays on June 28, 2006, against the Florida Marlins, pitching two scoreless innings.

In 2007, despite his strong performance during spring training, he recorded a 3–4 record with an 8.13 ERA. He was then sent to the Triple-A Durham Bulls and had a solid season of 9–4 with 3.69 ERA.

On December 11, 2007, Seo signed with the Kia Tigers of the Korea Professional Baseball League.

== International play ==
Seo was selected and played for the South Korean national team in the 2006 World Baseball Classic. He pitched extremely well, having tied with the second lowest ERA in the tournament with the Dominican Republic's Bartolo Colón, with a 0.64 ERA. In the semi-final game against Japan, in 6 innings Seo did not allow a single run. Even though Japan eventually won the game, Seo's start was still considered one of the best pitching performances in the WBC.
