= B. J. LaMura =

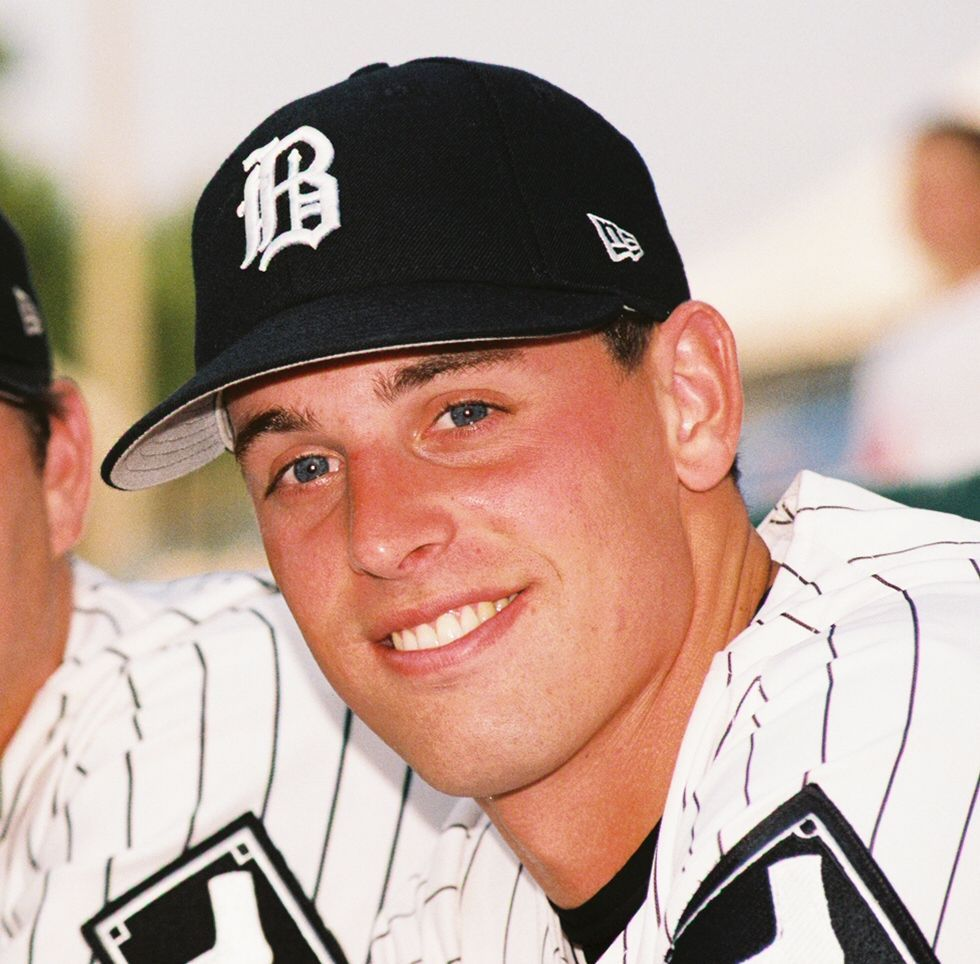
- Pitcher
- Born: January 1, 1981 (age 45); Mineola, New York, U.S.
- Bats: Right Throws: Right
- Stats at Baseball Reference

William Joseph "B. J." LaMura (born January 1, 1981) is an American former professional baseball pitcher who played internationally for the Italy national baseball team in the 2009 World Baseball Classic.

== High school & college ==
A native of Mineola, New York, LaMura attended Connetquot High School where he was rated as the No. 3 high school prospect in New York and among the top 100 in the nation by Baseball America following his senior year in 1999. He went on to attend Clemson University, and in 2000 and 2001 he played collegiate summer baseball with the Falmouth Commodores of the Cape Cod Baseball League. His junior year at Clemson (2002), he compiled a 6–2 record and 3.66 earned run average with a save and 89 strikeouts in 82 innings pitched in eight starts and nine relief appearances.

== Professional career ==
The Chicago White Sox made LaMura their fifth round selection of the 2002 MLB draft. Over four and a half seasons in the ChiSox farm system, he compiled a 20–25 record with six saves before a July 23, 2006 trade to the Los Angeles Dodgers in exchange for catcher Sandy Alomar Jr.

With the Dodgers, he went 6–9 in two and a half seasons with the Double-A Jacksonville Suns and Triple-A Las Vegas 51s. He became a free agent at the end of the 2008 season.

In an effort to showcase his talent to other major league clubs, LaMura played winter ball in Venezuela for Aguilas del Zulia, and represented Italy in the 2009 World Baseball Classic. In 1.2 total innings pitched, LaMura gave up four earned runs in Italy's two losses to Venezuela.

He played for the independent Long Island Ducks in 2009 and signed with the Toronto Blue Jays as a minor league free agent in 2010.
