= Julio Lugo =

Dominican baseball player (1975–2021)

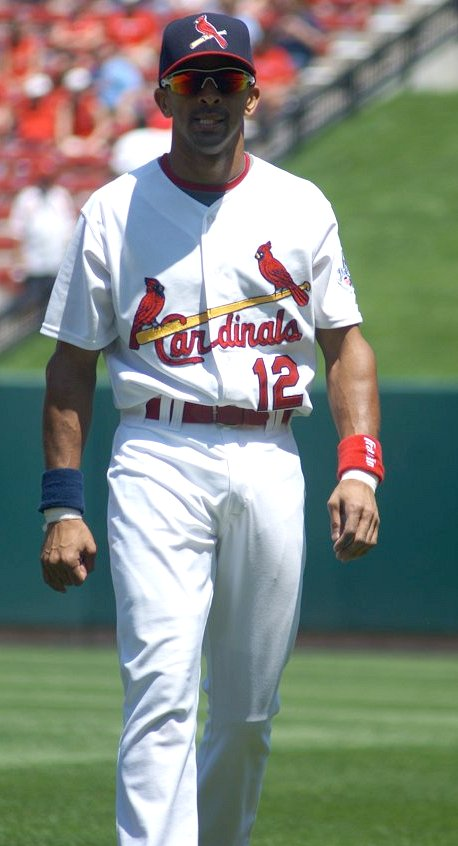
- Lugo with the St. Louis Cardinals
- Shortstop
- Born: November 16, 1975; Barahona, Dominican Republic
- Died: November 15, 2021 (aged 45); Santo Domingo, Dominican Republic
- Batted: Right Threw: Right

MLB debut
- April 15, 2000, for the Houston Astros

Last MLB appearance
- August 23, 2011, for the Atlanta Braves

MLB statistics
- Batting average: .269
- Home runs: 80
- Runs batted in: 475
- Stats at Baseball Reference

Teams
- Houston Astros (2000–2003); Tampa Bay Devil Rays (2003–2006); Los Angeles Dodgers (2006); Boston Red Sox (2007–2009); St. Louis Cardinals (2009); Baltimore Orioles (2010); Atlanta Braves (2011)

Career highlights and awards
- World Series champion (2007)

Julio Cesar Lugo (November 16, 1975 – November 15, 2021) was a Dominican professional baseball shortstop. He played 12 seasons in Major League Baseball (MLB) for the Houston Astros, Tampa Bay Devil Rays, Los Angeles Dodgers, Boston Red Sox, St. Louis Cardinals, Baltimore Orioles, and Atlanta Braves. He was the elder brother of pitcher Ruddy Lugo.

== Baseball career ==
Lugo was born in the Dominican Republic and at age 13 moved to Sunset Park, Brooklyn, where he attended Fort Hamilton High School. In addition to playing baseball for Fort Hamilton, he played in the Youth Service League in Brooklyn; alumni of that program include Manny Ramírez and Shawon Dunston. He went on to play college baseball at Connors State College in Oklahoma.

=== Houston Astros ===
The Houston Astros selected Lugo in the 43rd round of the 1994 MLB draft, although he did not sign with the team until May 1995. He made his professional debut in 1995 with the Auburn Astros, a Class A Short Season team in the New York–Penn League; appearing in 59 games, he had a .291 batting average with one home run and 16 runs batted in (RBIs). He advanced through the Houston farm system, reaching the Triple-A level in 2000 with the New Orleans Zephyrs. Early that season, Lugo was promoted to the major-league Astros, and made his MLB debut on April 15, 2000. Lugo played in 116 games for the Astros that year, batting .283 with 10 home runs and 40 RBIs. He made appearances at shortstop, second base, all three outfield positions, and designated hitter.

In 2001, Lugo played in 140 games, batting .263 with 10 home runs and 37 RBIs. The following season, he batted .261 with eight home runs and 35 RBIs in 88 games. In mid-August, Lugo's left arm was broken when he was hit by a pitch from Kerry Wood of the Chicago Cubs, ending his 2002 season.

On April 30, 2003, Lugo was arrested after a game at Minute Maid Park and charged with assaulting his wife. He was designated for assignment and subsequently released by the Astros. Lugo had appeared with 22 games that season with Houston.

Overall, Lugo appeared in 366 games for the Astros, batting .268 with 28 home runs and 114 RBIs. He appeared in one postseason series with Houston, the 2001 National League Division Series, batting 0-for-8 in three games.

=== Tampa Bay Devil Rays ===
In mid-May 2003, Lugo signed with the Tampa Bay Devil Rays. In mid-July, he was acquitted of the assault charges after his then-wife (the couple had filed for divorce) testified that she had instigated the incident and he did not intend to hurt her. Lugo appeared in 117 games with the Rays through the end of the season, batting .275 with 15 home runs and 53 RBIs. He hit home runs in four consecutive games against the Toronto Blue Jays during September 22–25.

In 2004, Lugo batted .275 with seven home runs and 75 RBIs in 157 games. The following season, he played 158 games while batting .295 with six home runs and 57 RBIs. Lugo spent the first half of 2006 with the Devil Rays, playing in 73 games with 12 home runs, 27 RBIs, and a .308 average. Two of his home runs came in a single inning, the fifth, of a home game against the Baltimore Orioles on July 22. Overall with Tampa Bay in parts of four seasons, Lugo had a .287 average with 40 home runs and 212 RBIs in 505 games.

=== Los Angeles Dodgers ===
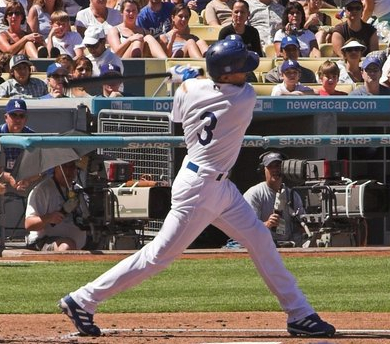
Lugo batting for the Los Angeles Dodgers in 2006

Lugo was traded at the 2006 trade deadline to the Los Angeles Dodgers for infielder Joel Guzmán and minor-league outfielder Sergio Pedroza. He appeared in 49 games with the Dodgers through the end of the regular season, batting .219 with no home runs and 10 RBIs. In the 2006 National League Division Series, Lugo batted 1-for-4 in two games as the Dodgers lost to the New York Mets. At the end of October, he became a free agent.

=== Boston Red Sox ===
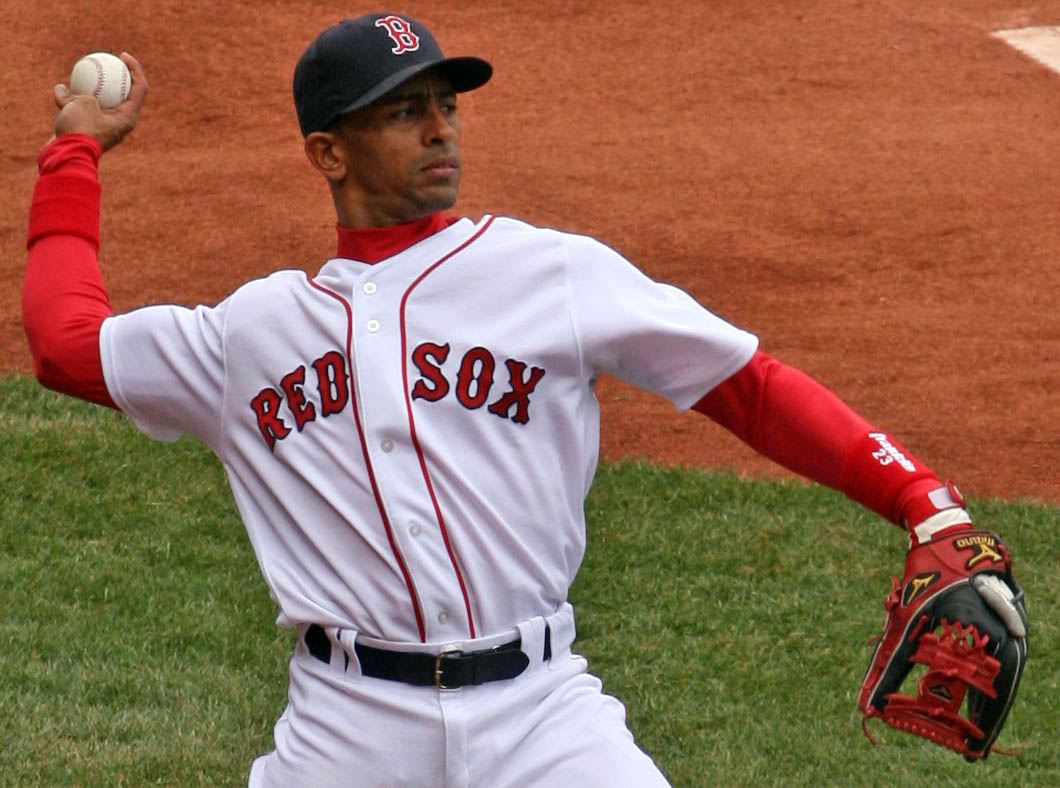
Lugo with the Boston Red Sox in 2007

On December 5, 2006, Lugo signed a four-year, $36 million contract with the Boston Red Sox. Lugo was brought on to bat leadoff, but was moved by manager Terry Francona to the bottom part of the order primarily due to his inability to consistently get on base.

During the 2007 season, from June 15 through July 2, inclusive, Lugo went 0–31 at the plate. At that time, Lugo had a .189 batting average. Since 1996, only Greg Vaughn—who had a .163 average with Tampa Bay on June 27, 2002—had a lower batting average with more than 250 at bats 80 games into a season. After the first week of July, Lugo turned his hitting performance around, compiling a 14-game hitting streak on July 25. He was 24-for-54 (.444) during the career-best streak, raising his average from .189 to .226. He had a streak of 20 consecutive stolen bases that ended on July 2, setting a club record. Lugo ended the regular season with a .237 average with eight home runs and 73 RBIs in 147 games. The Red Sox advanced to the World Series where they swept the Colorado Rockies in four games; Lugo played in 14 postseason games with Boston, while batting .385 (5-for-13) in the World Series.

During 2008, Lugo committed 16 errors through July 5, nearly one-third of the 50 errors made by the Red Sox as a team to that point in the season. Six days later, Lugo injured his left quad running out a hit; he was placed on the disabled list and missed the rest of the season. In 82 games, he batted .268 with one home run and 22 RBIs. On March 17, 2009, Lugo underwent arthroscopic surgery on his right knee to repair a torn meniscus cartilage. He returned to the team in late April, batting .284 in 37 games through early July, while committing seven errors. On July 17, Lugo was designated for assignment by the Red Sox.

Overall during 2007–2009 with the Red Sox, Lugo appeared in 266 games while batting .251 with 10 home runs and 103 RBIs.

=== Later career ===
On July 22, 2009, Lugo was traded to the St. Louis Cardinals for Chris Duncan and cash considerations. In 51 games with the Cardinals through the end of the season, Lugo batted .277 with two home runs and 13 RBIs. Defensively, he split time between shortstop (24 appearances) and second base (30 appearances). He batted 2-for-5 in three games of the 2009 National League Division Series, which the Cardinals lost to the Dodgers.

On April 1, 2010, Lugo was traded to the Baltimore Orioles for a player to be named later. He batted .249 in 93 games with no home runs and 20 RBIs during the season. He was used primarily at second base (59 appearances) while also seeing time at shortstop, third base, left field, and designated hitter.

Lugo signed a minor-league contract with the Atlanta Braves on May 23, 2011. He was added to the Braves' major-league roster when they purchased his contract on June 21. In 22 games with Atlanta, Lugo batted .136 (6-for-44) with no home runs and three RBIs. The Braves released Lugo on September 2.

On January 21, 2012, Lugo agreed to a minor league contract with the Cleveland Indians with an invitation to spring training. On January 30, the deal was reported to have fallen apart and he remained a free agent. Lugo did not play professionally during the 2012 regular season. His final season was in 2013, as a member of the Peoria Explorers of the Freedom Pro Baseball League, an independent baseball league.

In 1,352 MLB games over 12 seasons, Lugo batted .269 with 80 home runs and 475 RBIs; he stole 198 bases. In eight minor-league seasons, he batted .294 with 39 home runs and 250 RBIs in 570 games. He also played three seasons in the Dominican Winter League for Leones del Escogido, and played for the Dominican Republic three times in the Caribbean Series.

In 2018, the Boston Red Sox held their first alumni game since 1993; Lugo hit a two-run homer off of Pedro Martínez for the only runs in the game.

== Personal life ==
Lugo and his second wife had one son and two daughters, and he also had an older son with his first wife.

In 2013, Lugo was inducted to the Connors State College athletic hall of fame.

In 2015, Lugo was arrested in the Dominican Republic for kidnapping a couple and holding them at gunpoint. The altercation stemmed from Lugo's claim that an architect misappropriated the money Lugo provided to finance a tourism-related development project, and the charges were later dismissed.

Lugo died of a heart attack on November 15, 2021, just one day before his 46th birthday.
