= Joel Guzmán =

Dominican baseball player (born 1984)

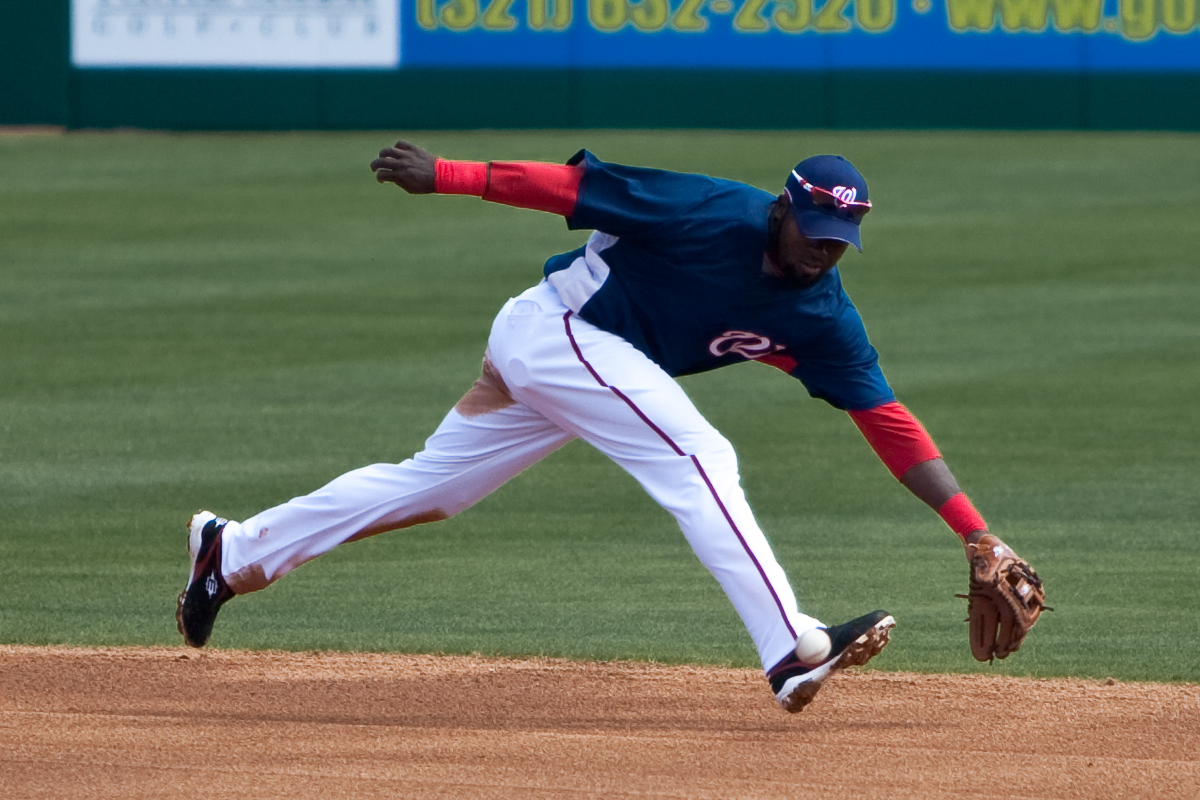
- Guzmán as a non-roster invitee of the Washington Nationals in 2009 spring training.
- Infielder
- Born: November 24, 1984 (age 41); Quisqueya, Dominican Republic
- Batted: Right Threw: Right

MLB debut
- June 1, 2006, for the Los Angeles Dodgers

Last MLB appearance
- September 30, 2007, for the Tampa Bay Devil Rays

MLB statistics
- Batting average: .232
- Home runs: 0
- Runs batted in: 7
- Stats at Baseball Reference

Teams
- Los Angeles Dodgers (2006); Tampa Bay Devil Rays (2007); Chunichi Dragons (2011)

Irvin Joel Vigo Guzmán (born November 24, 1984) is a Dominican professional baseball player. He played in Major League Baseball (MLB) for the Los Angeles Dodgers and Tampa Bay Devil Rays, and in Nippon Professional Baseball (NPB) for the Chunichi Dragons.

== Career ==
=== Los Angeles Dodgers ===
Guzmán signed with the Los Angeles Dodgers as an international free agent on July 2, 2001. He was signed for $2.25 million, a franchise record signing bonus. Guzmán worked his way through the minor leagues, becoming a top prospect. He was named the Dodgers Minor League Player of the Year in 2004 and was elected to the Florida State League All-Star Game. In 2005, he was named a Southern League All-Star, and ranked the fifth-best overall prospect by Baseball America. Guzmán also played in the All-Star Futures Game twice, in 2004 and 2006. With a jump to the Major League level predicted for the 2006 season, Dodgers manager Grady Little converted Guzmán to left field during spring training. With Rafael Furcal, César Izturis, and Oscar Robles already playing shortstops on the Dodgers major league roster, the position change was made in an attempt to give Guzmán increased opportunity to play with the Dodgers in 2006. He made his major league debut on June 1 of that year, as a defensive replacement in the eighth inning of a game against the Philadelphia Phillies. Guzmán grounded into a double play in his first at-bat in the bottom half of the inning.

=== Tampa Bay Rays ===
On July 31, 2006, Guzmán and Sergio Pedroza were traded to the Tampa Bay Devil Rays in exchange for Julio Lugo. He spent most of the 2007 season with the Triple-A Durham Bulls, but made his Devil Rays debut on August 19 against the Cleveland Indians. Guzmán recorded his first major league hit, a walk-off single off of Rafael Pérez, that day.

Guzmán spent the entirety of the 2008 season with Durham, hitting .248/.276/.438 with 20 home runs and 72 RBI. On September 9, 2008, Guzmán was designated for assignment by Tampa Bay; he cleared waivers and was sent outright to Triple-A Durham on September 12.

=== Washington Nationals ===
On December 13, 2008, Guzmán signed a minor league contract with the Washington Nationals organization. He split the 2009 season between the Double-A Harrisburg Senators and Triple-A Syracuse Chiefs, slashing .268/.338/.421 with 12 home runs and 59 RBI across 120 total appearances. Guzmán elected free agency following the season on November 9, 2009.

=== Baltimore Orioles ===
On February 4, 2010, the Baltimore Orioles signed Guzmán to a minor league contract. He made 130 appearances for the Double-A Bowie Baysox, batting .279/.344/.519 with 33 home runs and 98 RBI. Guzmán elected free agency following the season on November 6.

=== Chunichi Dragons ===
On December 14, 2010, Guzmán signed with the Chunichi Dragons of Nippon Professional Baseball League. Guzmán made 73 appearances for the Dragons during the 2011 season, hitting .181/.219/.298 with seven home runs and 15 RBI.

=== Cincinnati Reds ===
On January 10, 2012, Guzmán signed a minor league contract with the Cincinnati Reds. He made 65 appearances for the Double-A Pensacola Blue Wahoos, hitting .263/.328/.394 with seven home runs and 35 RBI. Guzmán was released by the Reds organization on June 22.

=== Vaqueros Laguna ===
On June 30, 2012, Guzmán signed with the Vaqueros Laguna of the Mexican League. Guzmán played in 22 games for the Vaqueros, hitting .322/.344/.494 with four home runs and 15 RBI.

=== Olmecas de Tabasco ===
On March 21, 2013, Guzmán signed with the Olmecas de Tabasco. In eight appearances for Tabasco, he went 8-for-28 (.286) with one home run and two RBI. Guzmán was released by the Olmecas on April 2.

=== Saraperos de Saltillo ===
On May 17, 2013, Guzmán signed with the Saraperos de Saltillo of the Mexican League. In 30 appearances for Saltillo, he batted .241/.323/.345 with four home runs, 13 RBI, and one stolen base. Guzmán was released by the Saraperos on June 27.

=== Camden Riversharks ===
In 2015, following a year of inactivity, Guzmán signed with the Camden Riversharks of the Atlantic League of Professional Baseball. Guzmán made 127 appearances for the Riversharks during the regular season, batting .250/.278/.383 with 13 home runs, 70 RBI, and 11 stolen bases.

=== York Revolution ===
On March 25, 2016, Guzmán signed with the York Revolution of the Atlantic League of Professional Baseball. In 122 appearances for the team, he slashed .278/.316/.423 with 16 home runs and 85 RBI.

On April 12, 2017, Guzmán re-signed with the Revolution. In 35 appearances for York, he batted .232/.285/.360 with four home runs and 17 RBI. Guzmán was released by the Revolution on June 11.

=== Sugar Land Skeeters ===
Guzmán finished the 2016 season with the Sugar Land Skeeters of the Atlantic League of Professional Baseball. In 10 appearances for Sugar Land, Guzmán went 2-for-37 (.054) with one home run, three RBI, and two walks.
