= 2006 Chicago Cubs season =

2006 Chicago Cubs
- League: National League
- Division: Central
- Ballpark: Wrigley Field
- City: Chicago
- Record: 66–96 (.407)
- Divisional place: 6th
- Owners: Tribune Company
- General managers: Jim Hendry
- Managers: Dusty Baker
- Television: CSN Chicago; Superstation WGN; WCIU-TV (Len Kasper, Bob Brenly)
- Radio: WGN (Pat Hughes, Ron Santo)
- Stats: ESPN.com; Baseball Reference

The 2006 Chicago Cubs season was the 135th season of the Chicago Cubs franchise, the 131st in the National League and the 91st at Wrigley Field. The Cubs finished with a record of 66–96 in last place of the National League Central. Chicago was managed by Dusty Baker.

== Offseason ==
- December 7, 2005: Juan Pierre was traded by the Florida Marlins to the Chicago Cubs for Sergio Mitre, Ricky Nolasco, and Renyel Pinto.
- January 10, 2006: Jacque Jones was signed as a free agent with the Chicago Cubs.

== Regular season ==
=== Season standings ===
==== National League Central ====
NL Central
Team	W	L	Pct.	GB	Home	Road
St. Louis Cardinals	83	78	.516	—	49‍–‍31	34‍–‍47
Houston Astros	82	80	.506	1½	44‍–‍37	38‍–‍43
Cincinnati Reds	80	82	.494	3½	42‍–‍39	38‍–‍43
Milwaukee Brewers	75	87	.463	8½	48‍–‍33	27‍–‍54
Pittsburgh Pirates	67	95	.414	16½	43‍–‍38	24‍–‍57
Chicago Cubs	66	96	.407	17½	36‍–‍45	30‍–‍51

==== Record vs. opponents ====
2006 National League record Source: MLB Standings Grid – 2006
Team	AZ	ATL	CHC	CIN	COL	FLA	HOU	LAD	MIL	NYM	PHI	PIT	SD	SF	STL	WAS	AL
Arizona	—	6–1	4–2	4–2	12–7	2–4	4–5	8–10	3–3	1–6	1–5	5–1	9–10	8–11	4–3	1–5	4–11
Atlanta	1–6	—	6–1	4–3	3–3	11–8	3–4	3–3	2–4	7–11	7–11	3–3	7–2	3–4	4–2	10–8	5–10
Chicago	2–4	1–6	—	10–9	2–4	2–4	7–8	4–2	8–8	3–3	2–5	6–9	0–7	2–4	11–8	2–4	4–11
Cincinnati	2–4	3–4	9–10	—	5–1	4–2	10–5	0–6	9–10	3–4	2–4	9–7	2–4	2–5	9–6	5–1	6-9
Colorado	7–12	3–3	4–2	1–5	—	3–3	4–2	4–15	2–4	1–5	3–4	3–3	10–9	10–8	2–7	8–0	11–4
Florida	4–2	8–11	4–2	2–4	3–3	—	3–4	1–5	7–0	8–11	6–13	5–2	3–3	3–3	1–5	11–7	9–9
Houston	5–4	4–3	8–7	5–10	2–4	4-3	—	3–3	10–5	2–4	2–4	13–3	3–3	1–5	9–7	4–4	7–11
Los Angeles	10–8	3–3	2–4	6–0	15–4	5–1	3–3	—	4–2	3–4	4–3	6–4	5–13	13–6	0–7	4–2	5–10
Milwaukee	3–3	4–2	8–8	10–9	4–2	0–7	5–10	2–4	—	3–3	5–1	7–9	4–3	6–3	7–9	1–5	6–9
New York	6–1	11–7	3–3	4–3	5–1	11–8	4–2	4–3	3–3	—	11–8	5–4	5–2	3–3	4–2	12–6	6–9
Philadelphia	5-1	11–7	5–2	4–2	4–3	13–6	4–2	3–4	1–5	8–11	—	3–3	2–4	5–1	3–3	9–10	5–13
Pittsburgh	1–5	3–3	9–6	7–9	3–3	2–5	3–13	4–6	9–7	4–5	3–3	—	1–5	6–1	6–9	3–3	3–12
San Diego	10–9	2–7	7–0	4–2	9–10	3–3	3–3	13–5	3–4	2–5	4–2	5–1	—	7–12	4–2	5–1	7–8
San Francisco	11–8	4–3	4–2	5–2	8–10	3–3	5–1	6–13	3–6	3–3	1–5	1–6	12–7	—	1–4	1–5	8–7
St. Louis	3–4	2–4	8–11	6–9	7–2	5-1	7–9	7–0	9–7	2–4	3–3	9–6	2–4	4–1	—	4–3	5–10
Washington	5–1	8–10	4–2	1–5	0–8	7-11	4–4	2–4	5–1	6–12	10–9	3–3	1–5	5–1	3–4	—	7–11

=== Notable transactions ===
- June 6, 2006: Jeff Samardzija was drafted by the Cubs in the 5th round (149th overall) of the 2006 Major League Baseball draft.

=== Roster ===
2006 Chicago Cubs
Roster
Pitchers: 54 David Aardsma; 46 Ryan Dempster; 47 Scott Eyre; 37 Ángel Guzmán; 53 Rich Hill; 62 Bob Howry; 31 Greg Maddux; 49 Carlos Mármol; 45 Sean Marshall; 51 Juan Mateo; 52 Wade Miller; 44 Roberto Novoa; 48 Ryan O'Malley; 50,13 Will Ohman; 22 Mark Prior; 33 Glendon Rusch; 20 Jae Kuk Ryu; 55 Les Walrond; 32,57 Jerome Williams; 48 Scott Williamson; 34 Kerry Wood; 43 Michael Wuertz; 38 Carlos Zambrano	Catchers: 8 Michael Barrett; 24 Henry Blanco; 61 José Reyes; 58 Geovany Soto; Infielders: 5 Ronny Cedeño; 15 Jerry Hairston Jr.; 3 César Izturis; 25 Derrek Lee; 17 John Mabry; 15 Scott Moore; 40 Phil Nevin; 13 Neifi Pérez; 16 Aramis Ramírez; 7 Ryan Theriot; 7 Todd Walker; 1 Tony Womack; Outfielders: 4 Freddie Bynum; 30 Buck Coats; 11 Jacque Jones; 19 Matt Murton; 29 Ángel Pagán; 9 Juan Pierre; 28 Michael Restovich	Manager: 12 Dusty Baker; Coaches: 2 Gene Clines (hitting); 6 Sonny Jackson (special asst); 59 Juan López (bullpen); 36 Gary Matthews (first base); 39 Dick Pole (bench); 41 Larry Rothschild (pitching); 35 Chris Speier (third base)

== Game log ==
2006 game log (66–96)
April: 13–10 (Home: 7–5; Away: 6–5)

#	Date	Opponent	Score	Win	Loss	Save	Attendance	Record
1	April 3	@ Reds	16–7	Ohman (1–0)	Harang (0–1)		42,591	1–0
2	April 5	@ Reds	8–6	Arroyo (1–0)	Rusch (0–1)	Weathers (1)	27,287	1–1
3	April 7	Cardinals	5–1	Maddux (1–0)	Suppan (0–1)		40,869	2–1
4	April 8	Cardinals	3–2	Howry (1–0)	Thompson (1–1)	Dempster (1)	40,182	3–1
5	April 9	Cardinals	8–4	Williamson (1–0)	Isringhausen (0–1)		39,839	4–1
6	April 11	Reds	9–2	Arroyo (2–0)	Rusch (0–2)		36,708	4–2
7	April 12	Reds	4–1	Maddux (2–0)	Claussen (0–1)	Dempster (2)	37,252	5–2
8	April 13	Reds	8–3	Milton (2–0)	Zambrano (0–1)		40,881	5–3
9	April 14	@ Pirates	8–6	Marshall (1–0)	Santos (1–2)		20,233	6–3
10	April 15	@ Pirates	2–1	Duke (1–1)	Williams (0–1)	Gonzalez (2)	34,264	6–4
11	April 16	@ Pirates	7–3	Rusch (1–2)	Snell (0–1)		15,020	7–4
12	April 17	@ Dodgers	4–1	Maddux (3–0)	Tomko (1–1)	Dempster (3)	33,511	8–4
13	April 18	@ Dodgers	2–1	Saito (1–0)	Ohman (1–1)		37,342	8–5
14	April 19	@ Dodgers	5–4	Williamson (2–0)	Báez (0–1)	Dempster (4)	41,288	9–5
15	April 21	@ Cardinals	9–3	Mulder (2–0)	Williams (0–2)		41,379	9–6
16	April 22	@ Cardinals	4–1	Ponson (2–0)	Rusch (1–3)	Isringhausen (5)	41,424	9–7
17	April 23	@ Cardinals	7–3	Maddux (4–0)	Marquis (3–1)		41,373	10–7
18	April 24	Marlins	6–3	Aardsma (1–0)	Johnson (1–2)	Dempster (5)	36,865	11–7
19	April 25	Marlins	3–1	Marshall (2–0)	Willis (1–1)	Dempster (6)	38,680	12–7
20	April 26	Marlins	7–5	Nolasco (1–0)	Williamson (2–1)	Borowski (3)	39,611	12–8
21	April 28	Brewers	6–2	Maddux (5–0)	Bush (2–2)		39,522	13–8
22	April 29	Brewers	16–2	Davis (1–2)	Rusch (1–4)		40,644	13–9
23	April 30	Brewers	9–0	Capuano (4–2)	Zambrano (0–2)		39,229	13–10

May: 7–22 (Home: 5–9; Away: 2–13)

#	Date	Opponent	Score	Win	Loss	Save	Attendance	Record
24	May 1	Pirates	2–1	Howry (2–0)	Grabow (0–1)	Dempster (7)	36,602	14–10
25	May 2	Pirates	8–0	Duke (2–2)	Guzmán (0–1)		39,110	14–11
26	May 3	@ Diamondbacks	5–1	Batista (3–1)	Maddux (5–1)	Valverde (8)	25,335	14–12
27	May 4	@ Diamondbacks	6–0	Cruz (1–0)	Hill (0–1)		24,565	14–13
28	May 5	@ Padres	1–0	Cassidy (2–0)	Williamson (2–2)		37,123	14–14
29	May 6	@ Padres	2–1	Cassidy (3–0)	Howry (2–1)		37,745	14–15
30	May 7	@ Padres	6–3	Williams (3–1)	Guzmán (0–2)	Sweeney (1)	39,847	14–16
31	May 8	@ Padres	8–3	Young (3–2)	Maddux (5–2)		24,139	14–17
32	May 9	@ Giants	6–1	Schmidt (3–2)	Hill (0–2)		39,357	14–18
33	May 10	@ Giants	8–1	Zambrano (1–2)	Cain (1–5)		39,655	15–18
34	May 11	@ Giants	9–3	Wright (3–3)	Marshall (2–1)		38,132	15–19
35	May 12	Padres	10–5	Sweeney (2–0)	Rusch (1–5)		39,245	15–20
36	May 13	Padres	4–3	Meredith (1–0)	Dempster (0–1)	Hoffman (7)	40,095	15–21
37	May 14	Padres	9–0	Hensley (2–2)	Hill (0–3)		39,570	15–22
38	May 16	Nationals	4–0	Zambrano (2–2)	Hernández (1–5)		39,298	16–22
39	May 17	Nationals	5–0	Marshall (3–1)	Day (2–4)		39,757	17–22
40	May 18	Nationals	5–3	Ortiz (1–4)	Wood (0–1)	Cordero (4)	40,517	17–23
41	May 19	@ White Sox	6–1	Buehrle (5–2)	Maddux (5–3)		39,301	17–24
42	May 20	@ White Sox	7–0	García (7–1)	Hill (0–4)		39,387	17–25
43	May 21	@ White Sox	7–4	Zambrano (3–2)	Cotts (0–2)	Dempster (8)	38,645	18–25
44	May 22	@ Marlins	9–1	Nolasco (3–1)	Marshall (3–2)		9,462	18–26
45	May 23	@ Marlins	5–4	Kensing (1–1)	Dempster (0–2)		10,979	18–27
46	May 24	@ Marlins	9–3	Moehler (2–4)	Maddux (5–4)		7,720	18–28
47	May 26	Braves	6–5	Remlinger (2–2)	Dempster (0–3)	Ray (1)	40,865	18–29
48	May 27	Braves	2–1	Ramírez (1–0)	Marshall (3–3)	Remlinger (2)	41,526	18–30
49	May 28	Braves	13–12	Villarreal (7–0)	Eyre (0–1)	Ray (2)	41,698	18–31
50	May 29	Reds	7–3	Wood (1–1)	Ramirez (2–4)	Dempster (9)	40,072	19–31
51	May 30	Reds	8–3	Maddux (6–4)	Claussen (3–6)		39,000	20–31
52	May 31	Reds	3–2	Milton (3–2)	Zambrano (3–3)	Coffey (2)	39,810	20–32

June: 9–18 (Home: 1–10; Away: 8–8)

#	Date	Opponent	Score	Win	Loss	Save	Attendance	Record
53	June 2	@ Cardinals	5–4	Dempster (1–3)	Hancock (1–2)		45,799	21–32
54	June 3	@ Cardinals	8–5	Rusch (2–5)	Mulder (5–4)	Howry (1)	45,820	22–32
55	June 4	@ Cardinals	9–6	Marquis (8–4)	Maddux (6–5)	Isringhausen (18)	45,753	22–33
56	June 5	@ Astros	8–0	Zambrano (4–3)	Buchholz (3–5)		32,814	23–33
57	June 6	@ Astros	4–1	Rodríguez (7–3)	Wood (1–2)		35,903	23–34
58	June 7	@ Astros	1–0	Sampson (1–0)	Marshall (3–4)	Lidge (15)	42,492	23–35
59	June 8	@ Reds	7–1	Arroyo (8–2)	Rusch (2–6)		26,059	23–36
60	June 9	@ Reds	6–5	Maddux (7–5)	Ramirez (2–5)	Dempster (10)	41,064	24–36
61	June 10	@ Reds	4–2	Zambrano (5–3)	Claussen (3–7)	Dempster (11)	34,141	25–36
62	June 11	@ Reds	9–3	Mármol (1–0)	Milton (4–3)		27,250	26–36
63	June 13	Astros	9–2	Pettitte (6–7)	Marshall (3–5)		40,563	26–37
64	June 14	Astros	5–4	Oswalt (6–3)	Maddux (7–6)	Lidge (17)	39,946	26–38
65	June 15	Astros	3–2	Borkowski (1–0)	Howry (2–2)	Lidge (18)	40,236	26–39
66	June 16	Tigers	5–3	Robertson (7–3)	Rusch (2–7)	Jones (18)	40,683	26–40
67	June 17	Tigers	9–3	Verlander (8–4)	Mármol (1–1)		41,459	26–41
68	June 18	Tigers	12–3	Rogers (10–3)	Prior (0–1)		39,938	26–42
69	June 19	@ Indians	12–8	Marshall (4–5)	Johnson (3–8)		26,769	27–42
70	June 20	@ Indians	4–2	Lee (6–5)	Maddux (7–7)	Wickman (10)	25,049	27–43
71	June 21	@ Indians	9–2	Zambrano (6–3)	Sabathia (5–4)		27,182	28–43
72	June 23	@ Twins	7–2	Santana (8–4)	Mármol (1–2)		34,361	28–44
73	June 24	@ Twins	3–0	Bonser (2–1)	Prior (0–2)	Nathan (12)	42,304	28–45
74	June 25	@ Twins	8–1	Radke (6–7)	Marshall (4–6)		35,128	28–46
75	June 26	Brewers	6–0	Capuano (9–4)	Maddux (7–8)		39,698	28–47
76	June 27	Brewers	8–5	Shouse (1–0)	Dempster (1–4)	Turnbow (22)	39,399	28–48
77	June 28	Brewers	6–3	Howry (3–2)	Kolb (2–2)	Dempster (12)	39,321	29–48
78	June 29	Brewers	5–4	González (1–0)	Prior (0–3)	Turnbow (23)	39,144	29–49
79	June 30	White Sox	6–2	Garland (7–3)	Marshall (4–7)		40,720	29–50

July: 14–12 (Home: 8–5; Away: 6–7)

#	Date	Opponent	Score	Win	Loss	Save	Attendance	Record
80	July 1	White Sox	8–6	Cotts (1–2)	Dempster (1–5)	Jenks (25)	41,027	29–51
81	July 2	White Sox	15–11	Zambrano (7–3)	Buehrle (9–5)	Howry (2)	40,919	30–51
82	July 3	@ Astros	7–2	Clemens (1–2)	Mármol (1–3)		41,655	30–52
83	July 4	@ Astros	7–2	Pettitte (7–9)	Prior (0–4)		41,502	30–53
84	July 5	@ Astros	1–0	Marshall (5–7)	Oswalt (6–5)	Dempster (13)	31,952	31–53
85	July 6	@ Brewers	2–0	Capuano (10–4)	Maddux (7–9)		37,326	31–54
86	July 7	@ Brewers	7–2	Zambrano (8–3)	Jackson (1–2)		41,172	32–54
87	July 8	@ Brewers	3–1	Mármol (2–3)	Bush (5–7)	Dempster (14)	42,268	33–54
88	July 9	@ Brewers	11–4	Rusch (3–7)	Davis (5–6)		41,528	34–54
89	July 14	Mets	6–3	Trachsel (9–4)	Maddux (7–10)		40,782	34–55
90	July 15	Mets	9–2	Zambrano (9–3)	Glavine (11–3)		41,368	35–55
91	July 16	Mets	13–7	Feliciano (3–2)	Marshall (5–8)		40,157	35–56
92	July 18	Astros	4–2	Mármol (3–3)	Oswalt (6–7)	Dempster (15)	39,883	36–56
93	July 19	Astros	4–2	Clemens (2–3)	Maddux (7–11)	Lidge (22)	40,344	36–57
94	July 20	Astros	4–1	Zambrano (10–3)	Pettitte (8–10)	Dempster (16)	40,208	37–57
95	July 21	@ Nationals	7–6	Rauch (3–1)	Howry (3–3)	Cordero (15)	35,442	37–58
96	July 22	@ Nationals	7–3	Hernández (7–8)	Williamson (2–3)		38,021	37–59
97	July 23	@ Nationals	7–1	Armas (7–5)	Mármol (3–4)		30,851	37–60
98	July 24	@ Mets	8–7	Maddux (8–11)	Trachsel (9–5)	Dempster (17)	45,631	38–60
99	July 25	@ Mets	8–6	Zambrano (11–3)	Glavine (11–4)	Howry (3)	47,686	39–60
100	July 26	@ Mets	1–0	Heilman (1–3)	Rusch (3–8)		40,299	39–61
101	July 27	Cardinals	5–4	Novoa (1–0)	Johnson (0–2)	Dempster (18)	40,346	40–61
102	July 28	Cardinals	6–5	Mármol (4–4)	Marquis (12–8)	Dempster (19)	40,420	41–61
103	July 29	Cardinals	4–2	Maddux (9–11)	Reyes (2–5)	Dempster (20)	41,302	42–61
104	July 30	Cardinals	6–3	Zambrano (12–3)	Carpenter (10–5)		40,033	43–61
105	July 31	Diamondbacks	15–4	Webb (12–4)	Prior (0–5)		39,226	43–62

August: 11–17 (Home: 6–7; Away: 5–10)

#	Date	Opponent	Score	Win	Loss	Save	Attendance	Record
106	August 1	Diamondbacks	9–3	Hill (1–4)	Vargas (8–8)		38,970	44–62
---	August 2	Diamondbacks	Postponed (rain) Rescheduled for August 3					44–62
107	August 3	Diamondbacks	10–2	Cruz (4–6)	Mármol (4–5)			44–63
108	August 3	Diamondbacks	7–3	Mateo (1–0)	González (3–3)		40,715	45–63
109	August 4	Pirates	6–0	Gorzelanny (2–2)	Zambrano (12–4)		39,973	45–64
110	August 5	Pirates	7–5	Prior (1–5)	Duke (7–10)	Dempster (21)	41,007	46–64
111	August 6	Pirates	6–1	Hill (2–4)	Snell (9–8)		40,320	47–64
112	August 8	@ Brewers	6–3	Mármol (5–5)	Ohka (3–3)	Dempster (22)	36,200	48–64
113	August 9	@ Brewers	6–3	Bush (8–8)	Zambrano (12–5)	Cordero (4)	36,012	48–65
114	August 10	@ Brewers	8–6	Davis (8–6)	Prior (1–6)	Cordero (5)	41,686	48–66
115	August 11	@ Rockies	10–2	Cook (8–10)	Hill (2–5)		35,744	48–67
116	August 12	@ Rockies	8–4	Fogg (8–7)	Guzmán (0–3)		43,485	48–68
117	August 13	@ Rockies	8–7	Novoa (2–0)	Corpas (0–1)	Dempster (23)	35,408	49–68
118	August 14	@ Astros	3–0	Zambrano (13–5)	Oswalt (9–8)	Dempster (24)	37,260	50–68
119	August 15	@ Astros	8–6	Hill (3–5)	Borkowski (1–1)		41,531	51–68
120	August 16	@ Astros	1–0	O'Malley (1–0)	Pettitte (11–13)	Howry (4)	38,989	52–68
121	August 18	Cardinals	11–3	Marquis (13–11)	Mármol (5–6)		40,346	52–69
122	August 19	Cardinals	5–4	Wuertz (1–0)	Isringhausen (4–6)		40,864	53–69
123	August 20	Cardinals	5–3	Carpenter (12–6)	Mateo (1–1)	Isringhausen (30)	40,485	53–70
124	August 21	Phillies	6–5	Lieber (6–9)	Hill (3–6)	Rhodes (3)	38,950	53–71
125	August 22	Phillies	6–3	Moyer (1–0)	O'Malley (1–1)	Madson (1)	38,770	53–72
126	August 23	Phillies	2–1	Myers (9–6)	Howry (3–4)	Geary (1)	39,470	53–73
127	August 24	Phillies	11–2	Zambrano (14–5)	Hamels (6–7)		39,464	54–73
128	August 25	@ Cardinals	2–0	Suppan (10–7)	Mateo (1–2)	Isringhausen (31)	46,004	54–74
129	August 26	@ Cardinals	2–1	Flores (1–1)	Novoa (2–1)		46,036	54–75
130	August 27	@ Cardinals	10–6	Looper (7–1)	Howry (3–5)		44,937	54–76
131	August 28	@ Pirates	11–6	Snell (12–8)	Guzmán (0–4)		12,666	54–77
132	August 29	@ Pirates	7–6	Capps (5–1)	Dempster (1–6)		14,618	54–78
133	August 30	@ Pirates	10–9	McLeary (1–0)	Dempster (1–7)		12,730	54–79

September: 11–17 (Home: 8–9; Away: 3–8)

#	Date	Opponent	Score	Win	Loss	Save	Attendance	Record
134	September 1	Giants	6–2	Hill (4–6)	Lowry (7–8)		38,582	55–79
135	September 2	Giants	4–2	Cain (11–9)	Marshall (5–9)	Stanton (4)	40,135	55–80
136	September 3	Giants	7–4	Schmidt (11–8)	Wuertz (1–1)	Stanton (5)	40,702	55–81
137	September 4	Pirates	5–4	Maholm (7–10)	Zambrano (14–6)	Torres (2)	37,994	55–82
138	September 5	Pirates	6–5	Grabow (4–1)	Dempster (1–8)	Torres (3)	31,494	55–83
139	September 6	Pirates	7–2	Wuertz (2–1)	Grabow (4–2)		32,557	56–83
140	September 7	Pirates	7–5	Bayliss (1–0)	Eyre (0–2)	Torres (4)	27,105	56–84
141	September 8	@ Braves	8–4	Hudson (12–10)	Guzmán (0–5)		30,977	56–85
142	September 9	@ Braves	7–3	James (9–3)	Miller (0–1)		40,584	56–86
143	September 10	@ Braves	2–1	Cormier (3–4)	Mateo (1–3)	Wickman (13)	28,212	56–87
144	September 11	@ Braves	8–3	Hill (5–6)	Smoltz (12–9)		19,444	57–87
145	September 12	Dodgers	9–8	Aardsma (2–0)	Hamulack (0–3)		35,618	58–87
146	September 13	Dodgers	6–0	Penny (16–8)	Guzmán (0–6)		35,868	58–88
147	September 14	Dodgers	6–5	Eyre (1–2)	Tomko (8–7)	Howry (5)	31,361	59–88
148	September 15	Reds	4–0	Arroyo (14–9)	Mármol (5–7)		37,188	59–89
149	September 16	Reds	4–0	Hill (6–6)	Michalak (1–3)		40,526	60–89
150	September 17	Reds	11–3	Zambrano (15–6)	Milton (8–8)		39,164	61–89
151	September 18	@ Phillies	11–6	Wuertz (3–1)	Lieber (8–10)		31,101	62–89
152	September 19	@ Phillies	4–1	Moyer (3–2)	Miller (0–2)	Gordon (32)	31,892	62–90
153	September 20	@ Phillies	6–2	Myers (12–6)	Walrond (0–1)		35,269	62–91
154	September 22	@ Reds	4–2	Michalak (2–3)	Hill (6–7)	Coffey (8)	21,332	62–92
155	September 23	@ Reds	11–4	Zambrano (16–6)	Lohse (2–5)		28,264	63–92
156	September 24	@ Reds	3–2	Harang (15–11)	Dempster (1–9)		22,226	63–93
157	September 25	@ Reds	5–4	Schoeneweis (2–0)	Eyre (1–3)	Weathers (12)	16,278	63–94
158	September 26	Brewers	14–6	Marshall (6–9)	Villanueva (1–2)		31,932	64–94
159	September 27	Brewers	3–2	Howry (4–5)	Cordero (3–1)		36,273	65–94
160	September 29	Rockies	5–2	Fogg (11–9)	Zambrano (16–7)	Fuentes (30)	33,721	65–95
161	September 30	Rockies	11–9	Ramírez (4–3)	Ryu (0–1)		39,483	65–96

October: 1–0 (Home: 1–0; Away: 0–0)

#	Date	Opponent	Score	Win	Loss	Save	Attendance	Record
162	October 1	Rockies	8–5	Aardsma (3–0)	Affeldt (4–2)		39,609	66–96

== Player stats ==
=== Batting ===
==== Starters by position ====
Note: Pos = Position; G = Games played; AB = At bats; H = Hits; Avg.= Batting average; HR = Home runs; RBI = Runs batted in

Pos	Player	G	AB	H	Avg.	HR	RBI
CF	Juan Pierre	162	699	204	.292	3	40
3B	Aramis Ramírez	157	593	173	.291	38	119
SS	Ronny Cedeño	151	534	131	.245	6	41
RF	Jacque Jones	149	533	152	.285	27	81
LF	Matt Murton	144	455	135	.297	13	62
C	Michael Barrett	107	375	115	.307	16	53
2B	Todd Walker	94	318	88	.277	6	40
1B	Derrek Lee	50	175	50	.286	8	30

==== Other batters ====
Note: G = Games played; AB = At bats; H = Hits; Avg.= Batting average; HR = Home runs; RBI = Runs batted in

Player	G	AB	H	Avg.	HR	RBI
Henry Blanco	74	241	64	.266	6	37
Neifi Pérez	87	236	60	.254	2	24
John Mabry	107	210	43	.205	5	25
Phil Nevin	67	179	49	.274	12	33
Ángel Pagán	77	170	42	.247	5	18
Freddie Bynum	71	136	35	.257	4	12
Ryan Theriot	53	134	44	.328	3	16
Jerry Hairston Jr.	38	82	17	.207	0	4
Cesar Izturis	22	73	17	.233	0	6
Tony Womack	19	50	14	.280	1	2
Scott Moore	16	38	10	.263	2	5
Geovany Soto	11	25	5	.200	0	2
Buck Coats	18	18	3	.167	1	1
Michael Restovich	10	12	2	.167	1	1
José Reyes	4	5	1	.200	0	2

=== Pitching ===
==== Starting pitchers ====
Note: G = Games pitched; IP = Innings pitched; W = Wins; L = Losses; ERA = Earned run average; S0 = Strikeouts

Player	G	IP	W	L	ERA	SO
Carlos Zambrano	33	214.0	16	7	3.41	210
Greg Maddux	22	136.1	9	11	4.69	81
Sean Marshall	24	125.2	6	9	5.59	77
Rich Hill	17	99.1	6	7	4.17	90
Juan Mateo	11	45.2	1	3	5.32	35
Mark Prior	9	43.2	1	6	7.21	38
Wade Miller	5	21.2	0	2	4.57	20
Kerry Wood	4	19.2	1	2	4.12	13
Ryan O'Malley	2	12.2	1	1	2.13	4

==== Other pitchers ====
Note: G = Games pitched; IP = Innings pitched; W = Wins; L = Losses; ERA = Earned run average; SO = Strikeouts

Player	G	IP	W	L	ERA	SO
Carlos Mármol	19	77.0	5	7	6.08	59
Glendon Rusch	25	66.1	3	8	7.46	59
Ángel Guzmán	15	56.0	0	6	7.39	60
Jerome Williams	5	12.1	0	2	7.30	5

==== Relief pitchers ====
Note: G = Games pitched; W = Wins; L = Losses; SV = Saves; ERA = Earned run average; SO = Strikeouts

Player	G	W	L	SV	ERA	SO
Ryan Dempster	74	1	9	24	4.80	67
Bob Howry	84	4	5	5	3.17	71
Will Ohman	78	1	1	0	4.13	74
Scott Eyre	74	1	3	0	3.38	73
Roberto Novoa	66	2	1	0	4.26	53
David Aardsma	45	3	0	0	4.08	49
Michael Wuertz	41	3	1	0	2.66	42
Scott Williamson	31	2	3	0	5.08	32
Les Walrond	10	0	1	0	6.23	21
Jae Kuk Ryu	10	0	1	0	8.40	17

== Farm system ==
Level	Team	League	Manager
AAA	Iowa Cubs	Pacific Coast League	Mike Quade and Bobby Dickerson
AA	West Tenn Diamond Jaxx	Southern League	Bobby Dickerson and Pat Listach
A	Daytona Cubs	Florida State League	Don Buford and Buddy Bailey
A	Peoria Chiefs	Midwest League	Jody Davis
A-Short Season	Boise Hawks	Northwest League	Steve McFarland
Rookie	AZL Cubs	Arizona League	Carmelo Martínez
