= List of Major League Baseball players from the Dominican Republic =

Flag of the Dominican Republic.

This is an alphabetical list of notable baseball players from the Dominican Republic who have played in Major League Baseball since 1950. Players in bold are still active in MLB, as of 2022.

Since 1956 a large number of baseball players of Dominican origin have played in Major League Baseball in the United States, with the Dominican Republic being the second country in the world after the United States with the most current baseball players in MLB.

== A ==
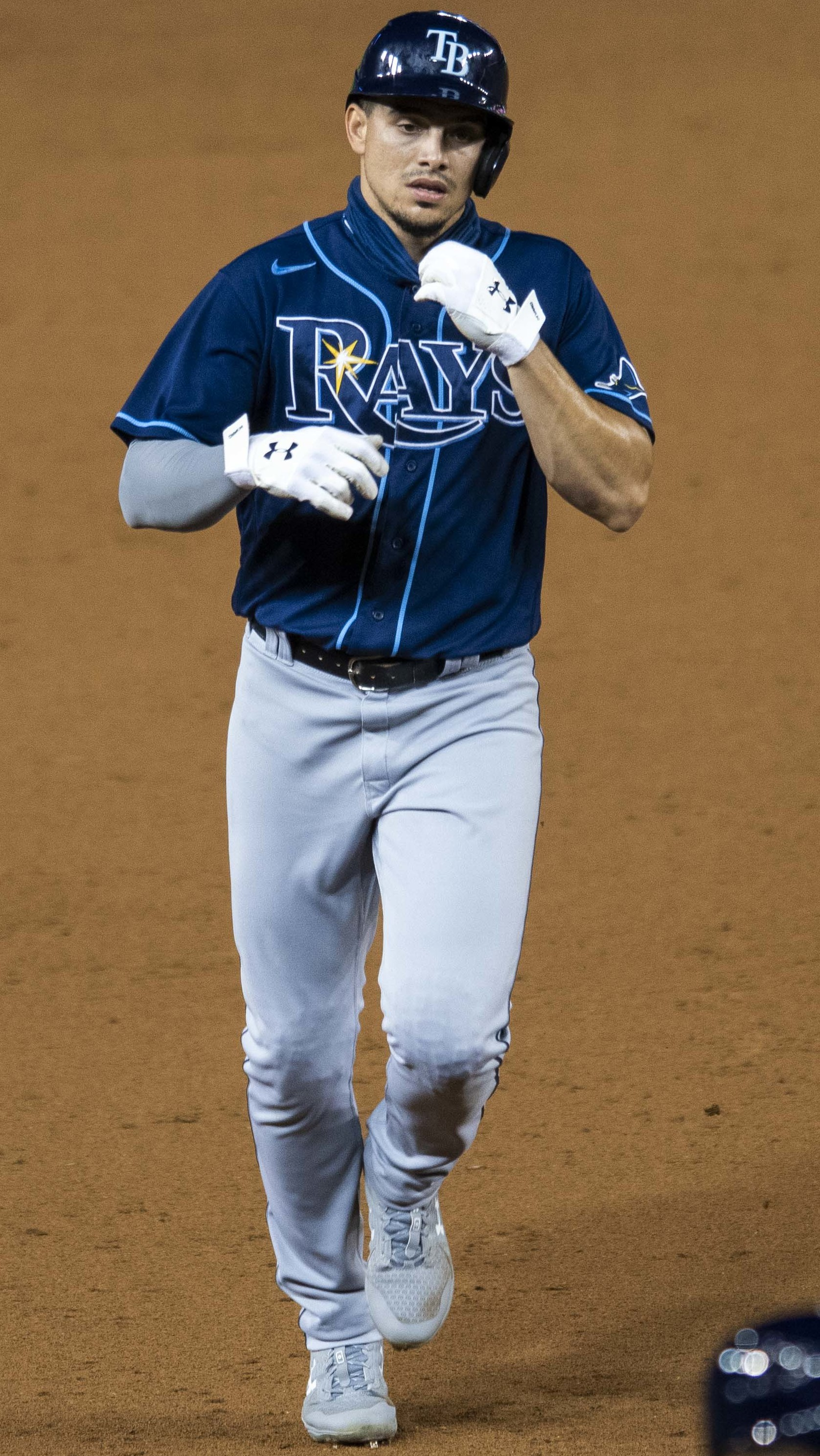
Willy Adames.

- **Fernando Abad**
- **Albert Abreu**
- Juan Abreu
- Tony Abreu
- Winston Abreu
- **Domingo Acevedo**
- José Acevedo
- Cristhian Adames
- **Willy Adames**
- **Joan Adon**
- Gibson Alba
- **Hanser Alberto**
- Al Alburquerque
- **Jorge Alcalá**
- Santo Alcalá
- Arismendy Alcántara
- Izzy Alcántara
- Raúl Alcántara
- **Sandy Alcántara**
- **Sergio Alcántara**
- Victor Alcántara
- Manny Alexander
- Antonio Alfonseca
- Carlos Almanzar
- **Abraham Almonte**
- Edwin Almonte
- Erick Almonte
- Héctor Almonte
- Miguel Almonte
- Zoilo Almonte
- Felipe Alou
- Jesús Alou
- Matty Alou
- Moisés Alou
- Darío Álvarez
- Pedro Álvarez
- Joaquín Andújar
- Luis Andújar
- **Miguel Andújar**
- **Aristides Aquino**
- Greg Aquino
- Jayson Aquino
- Pedro Araújo
- Alberto Árias
- Joaquín Arias
- **Jonathan Aro**
- José Arredondo
- Jairo Asencio
- Miguel Asencio
- Ezequiel Astacio
- Pedro Astacio
- Abiatal Avelino
- Erick Aybar
- Manny Aybar
- Willy Aybar

== B ==
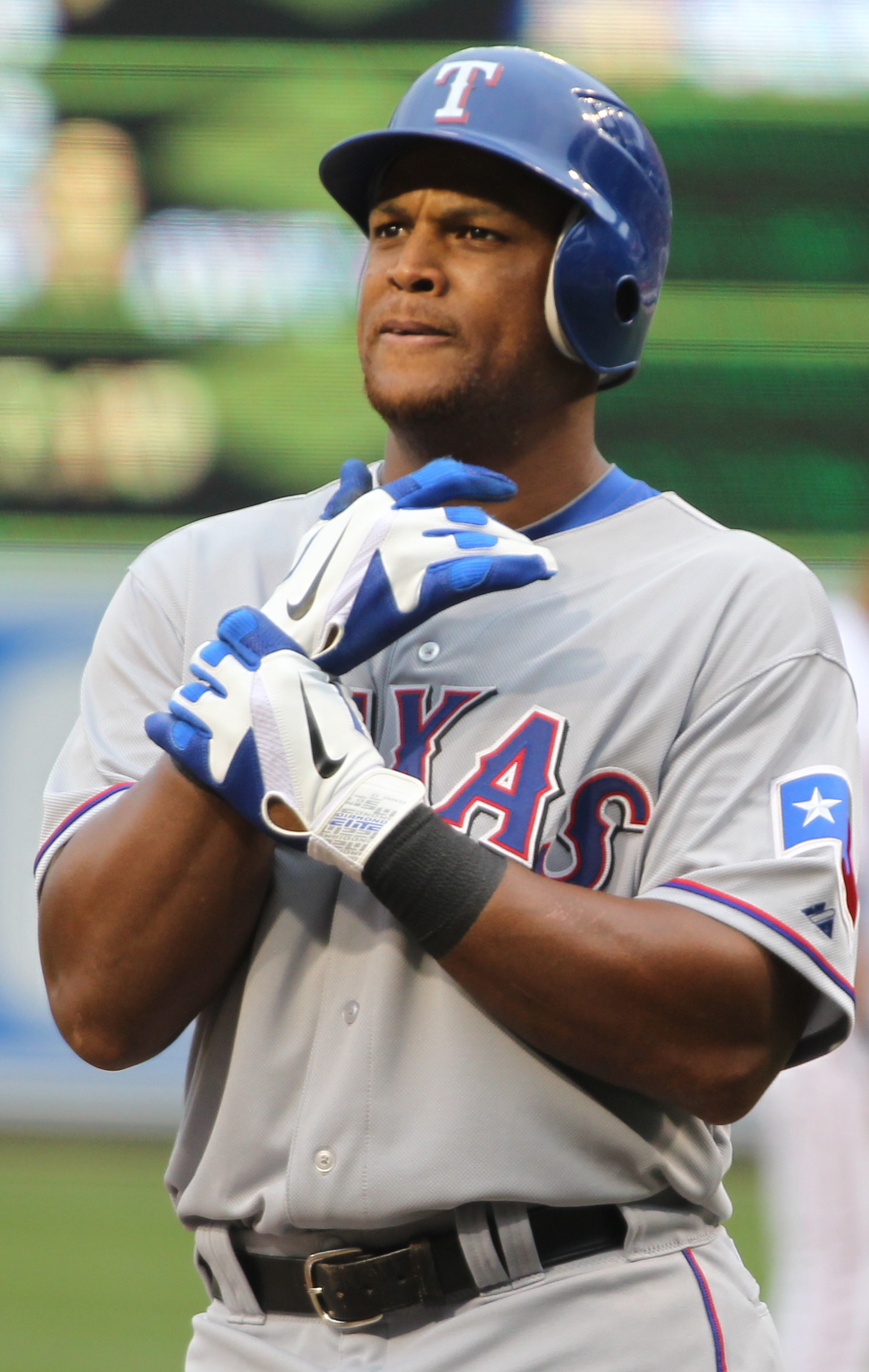
Adrian Beltre.

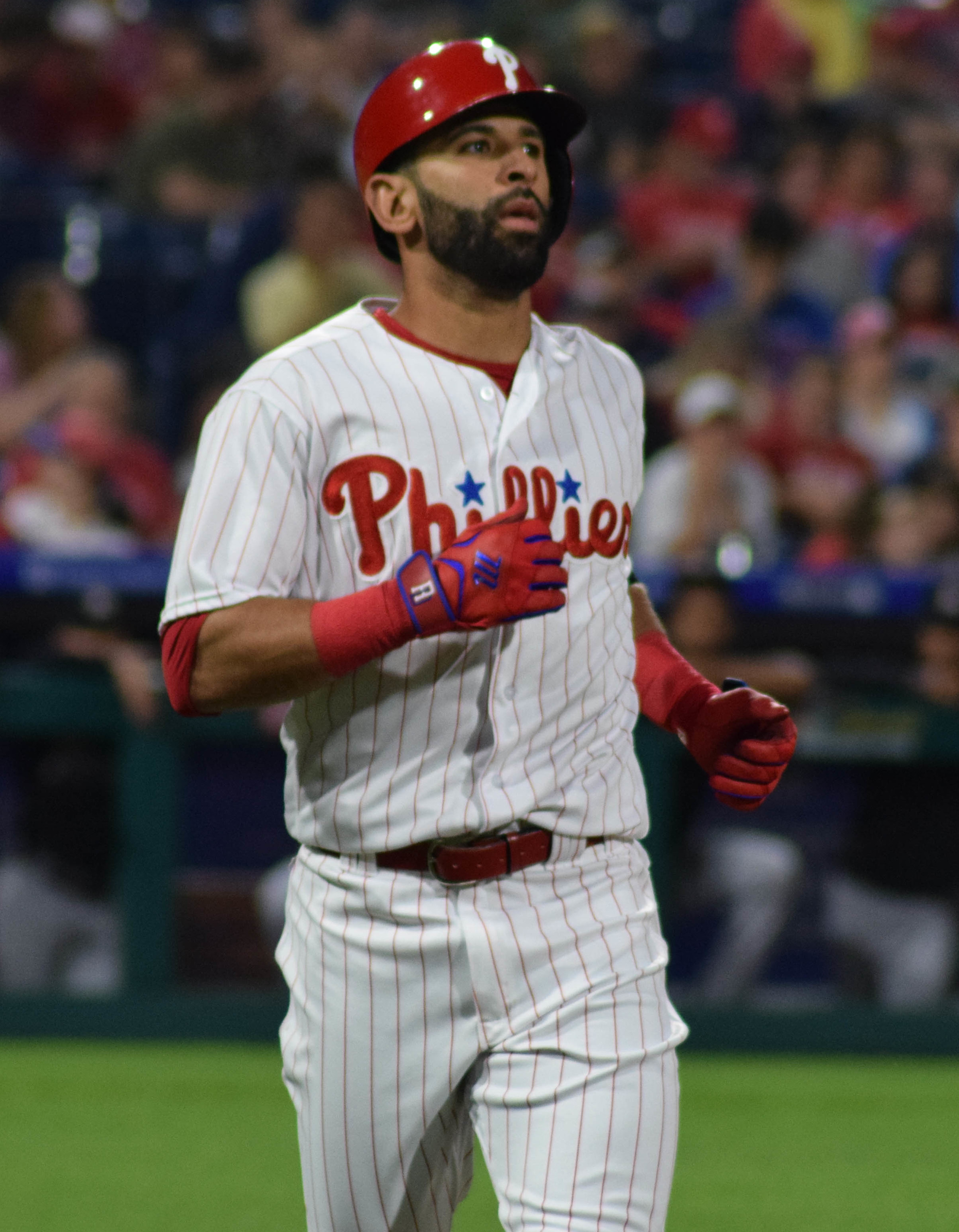
Jose Bautista.

- Benito Báez
- José Báez
- **Pedro Báez**
- Sandy Báez
- Lorenzo Barceló
- **Luis Barrera**
- Antonio Bastardo
- Miguel Batista
- Rafael Batista
- Tony Batista
- Danny Bautista
- Denny Bautista
- **Félix Bautista**
- Gerson Bautista
- José Bautista (OF/3B)
- José Bautista (P)
- Rafael Bautista
- Pedro Beato
- George Bell
- Juan Bell
- Rafael Belliard
- Ronnie Belliard
- **Brayan Bello**
- Francis Beltrán
- Adrián Beltré
- Engel Beltré
- Esteban Beltré
- Omar Beltré
- Armando Benítez
- Joaquín Benoit
- Juan Bernhardt
- Ángel Berroa
- Gerónimo Berroa
- Dellin Betances
- Wilson Betemit
- Randor Bierd
- **Ronel Blanco**
- Tony Blanco
- Emilio Bonifacio
- **Jorge Bonifacio**
- Lisalverto Bonilla
- Pedro Borbón
- Pedro Borbón Jr.
- Rafael Bournigal
- **Huascar Brazobán**
- Yhency Brazobán
- Lesli Brea
- Bernardo Brito
- Eude Brito
- Jorge Brito
- Juan Brito (catcher)
- Juan Brito (infielder)
- Julio Borbón
- Socrates Brito
- Tilson Brito
- **Vidal Bruján**
- Ambiorix Burgos

== C ==
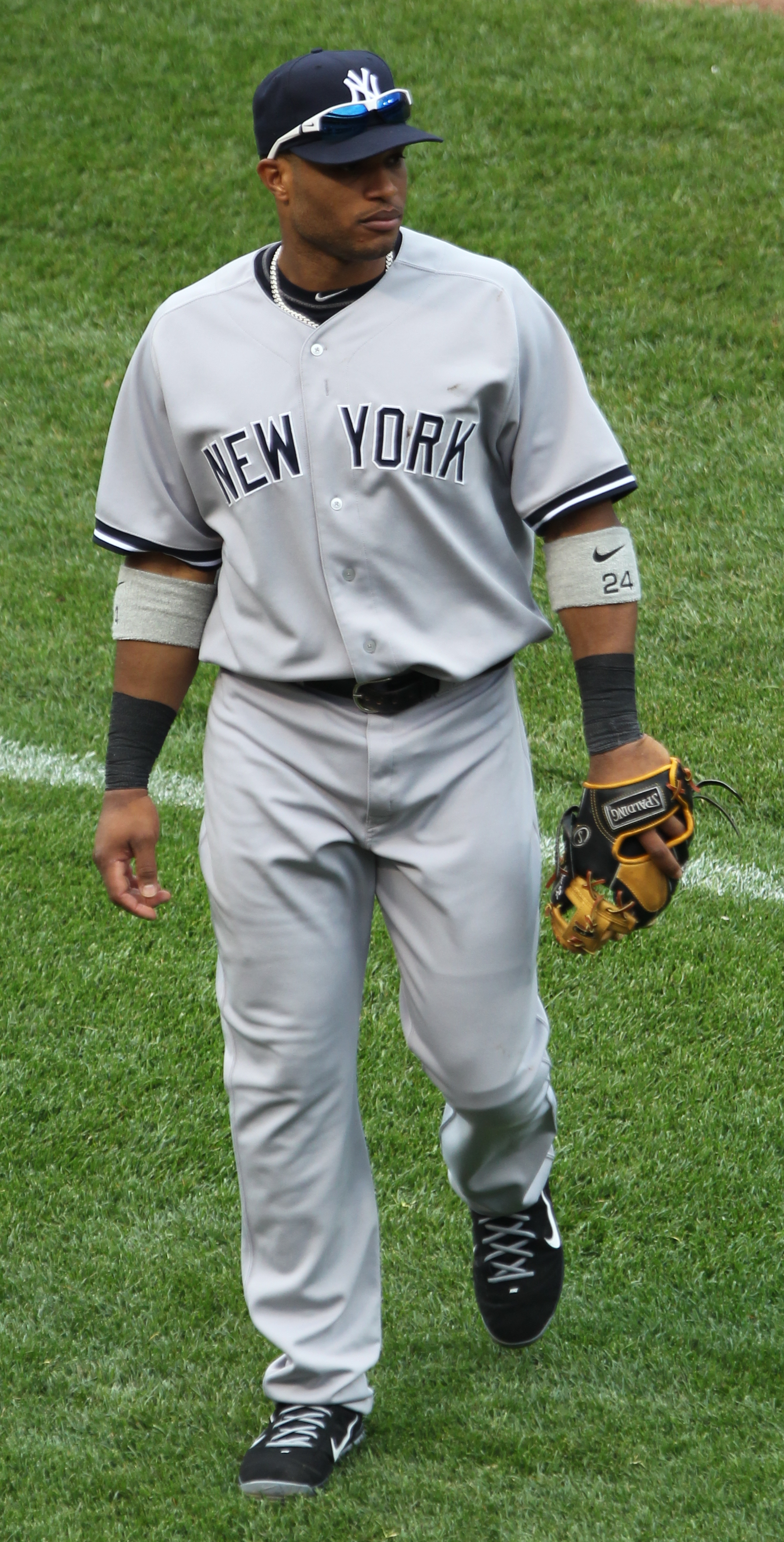
Robinson Cano.

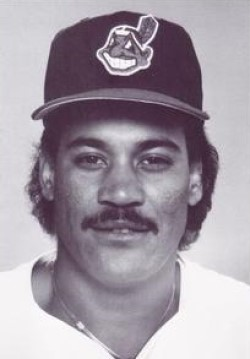
Carmelo Castillo.

- César Cabral
- Alberto Cabrera
- Daniel Cabrera
- Edwar Cabrera
- **Edward Cabrera**
- Francisco Cabrera
- Génesis Cabrera
- José Cabrera
- Mauricio Cabrera
- Melky Cabrera
- Orlando Calixte
- Napoleón Calzado
- Arquimedes Caminero
- **Jeimer Candelario**
- Luis Campusano
- Silvestre Campusano
- José Canó
- **Robinson Canó**
- José Capellán
- Ramón Caraballo
- Héctor Carrasco
- Joel Carreño
- Rico Carty
- Alexi Casilla
- Santiago Casilla
- Carlos Casimiro
- Alberto Castillo
- Braulio Castillo
- Carmen Castillo
- **Diego Castillo**
- Fabio Castillo
- **Iván Castillo**
- Juan Castillo
- Lendy Castillo
- Luis Castillo (2B)
- **Luis Castillo (P), born 1992**
- **Luis Castillo (P), born 1995**
- Manny Castillo
- Welington Castillo
- Wilkin Castillo
- Ángel Castro
- Bernie Castro
- Bill Castro
- Fabio Castro
- **Miguel Castro**
- **Rodolfo Castro**
- Simón Castro
- Starlin Castro
- Willi Castro
- José Ceda
- Andújar Cedeño
- César Cedeño
- Domingo Cedeño
- Robinson Checo
- **Gilberto Celestino**
- Pedro Ciriaco
- José Cisnero
- **Emmanuel Clase**
- Maikel Cleto
- Pasqual Coco
- **Álex Colomé**
- Jesús Colomé
- Bartolo Colón
- Román Colón
- José Constanza
- Carlos Contreras
- **Roansy Contreras**
- Daniel Corcino
- **Franchy Cordero**
- Francisco Cordero
- Jimmy Cordero
- **Narciso Crook**
- Francisco Cruceta
- Deivi Cruz
- Enrique Cruz
- Fausto Cruz
- Juan Cruz
- Nelson Cruz (P)
- **Nelson Cruz (OF)**
- **Oneil Cruz**
- Rhiner Cruz
- Víctor Cruz
- **José Cuas**
- **Johnny Cueto**

== D ==
- Alejandro De Aza
- **Ángel De Jesús**
- **Bryan De La Cruz**
- **Elly De La Cruz** (born 2002)
- Frankie de la Cruz
- Joel De La Cruz
- Eury De La Rosa
- Francisco de la Rosa
- Rubby De La Rosa
- Jesús de la Rosa
- Tomás de la Rosa
- Jorge de León
- Abel De Los Santos
- Enyel De Los Santos
- Fautino de los Santos
- Luis de los Santos (1B)
- Luis De Los Santos (3B)
- Luis de los Santos (P)
- Ramón de los Santos
- Valerio de los Santos
- **Yerry De Los Santos**
- Miguel Del Pozo
- Jorge DePaula
- Samuel Deduno
- Arturo DeFreites
- José DeLeón
- Wilson Delgado
- José de Paula
- Julio DePaula
- César Devarez
- **José Devers**
- **Rafael Devers**
- Félix Díaz
- Joselo Díaz
- Juan Díaz
- Jumbo Díaz
- **Miguel Díaz**
- **Lewin Díaz**
- Robinzon Díaz
- Víctor Díaz
- **Yainer Díaz**
- Yennsy Díaz
- **Wilmer Difo**
- **Marcos Diplán**
- Miguel Diloné
- Rafael Dolis
- Freddy Dolsi
- José Dominguez
- Juan Dominguez
- **Seranthony Domínguez**
- Octavio Dotel
- **Camilo Doval**
- Mariano Duncan
- **Ezequiel Durán**
- **Jhoan Durán**
- Roberto Durán

== E ==
- Angelo Encarnación
- Edwin Encarnación
- **Jerar Encarnación**
- Juan Encarnación
- Luis Encarnación
- Mario Encarnación
- Juan Espino
- Nino Espinosa
- **Raynel Espinal**
- **Santiago Espinal**
- **Carlos Estévez**
- Leo Estrella
- Tony Eusebio

== F ==
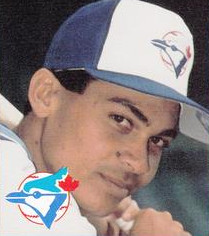
Junior Felix.

- **Jeurys Familia**
- Carlos Febles
- Junior Félix
- **Michael Feliz**
- Neftalí Feliz
- Pedro Feliz
- Félix Fermín
- Ramón Fermín
- José Fernández
- Junior Fernández
- **Julián Fernández**
- Tony Fernández
- Alfredo Fígaro
- Bienvenido Figueroa
- Jesús Figueroa
- Pedro Figueroa
- Yohan Flande
- Kendry Flores
- Pedro Florimón
- **Estevan Florial**
- Bartolomé Fortunato
- Frank Francisco
- Juan Francisco
- Julio Franco
- **Maikel Franco**
- **Wander Franco**
- Carlos Frías
- Hanley Frias
- **Luis Frías**
- Pepe Frías
- Rafael Furcal

== G ==
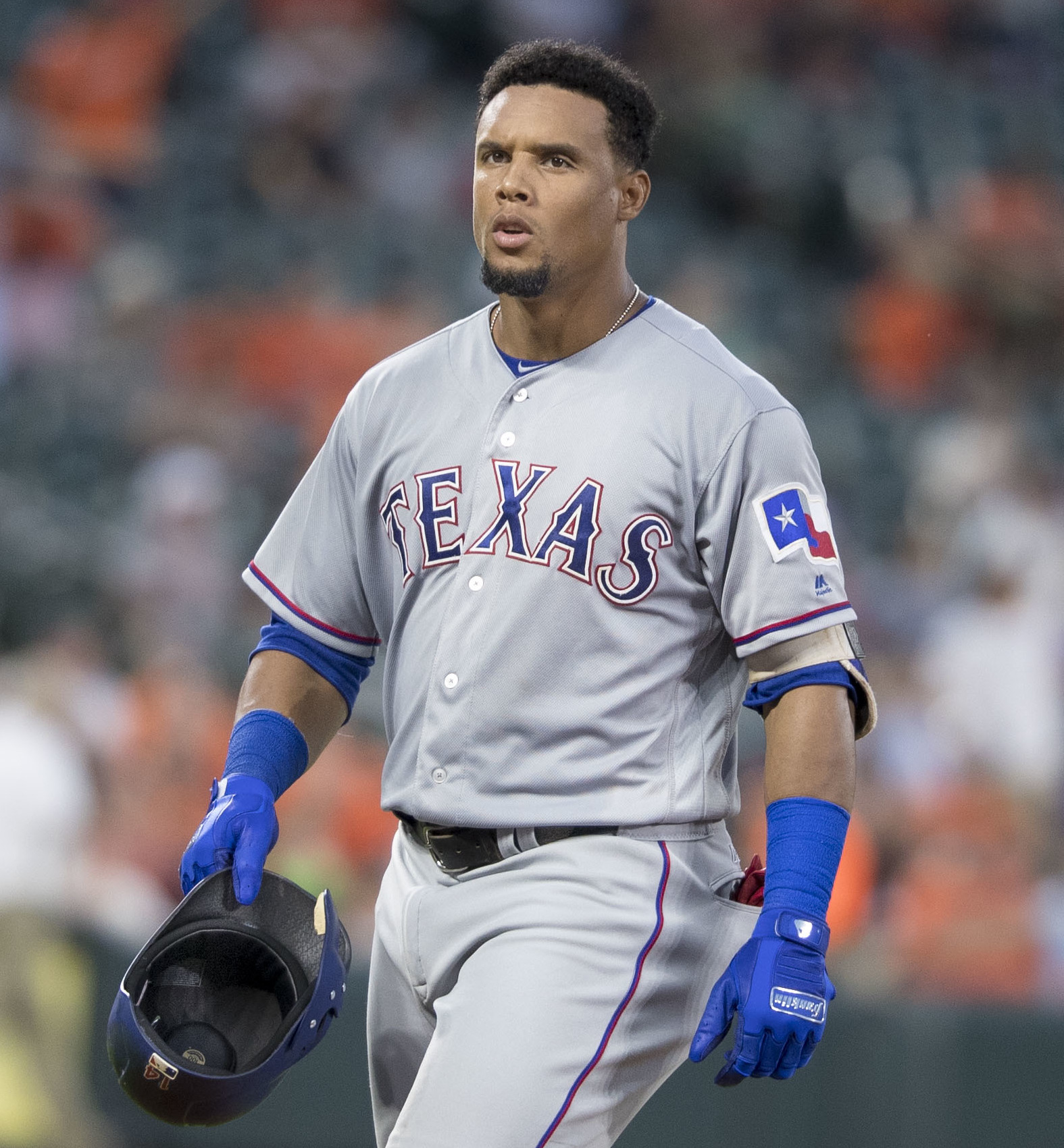
Carlos Gómez.

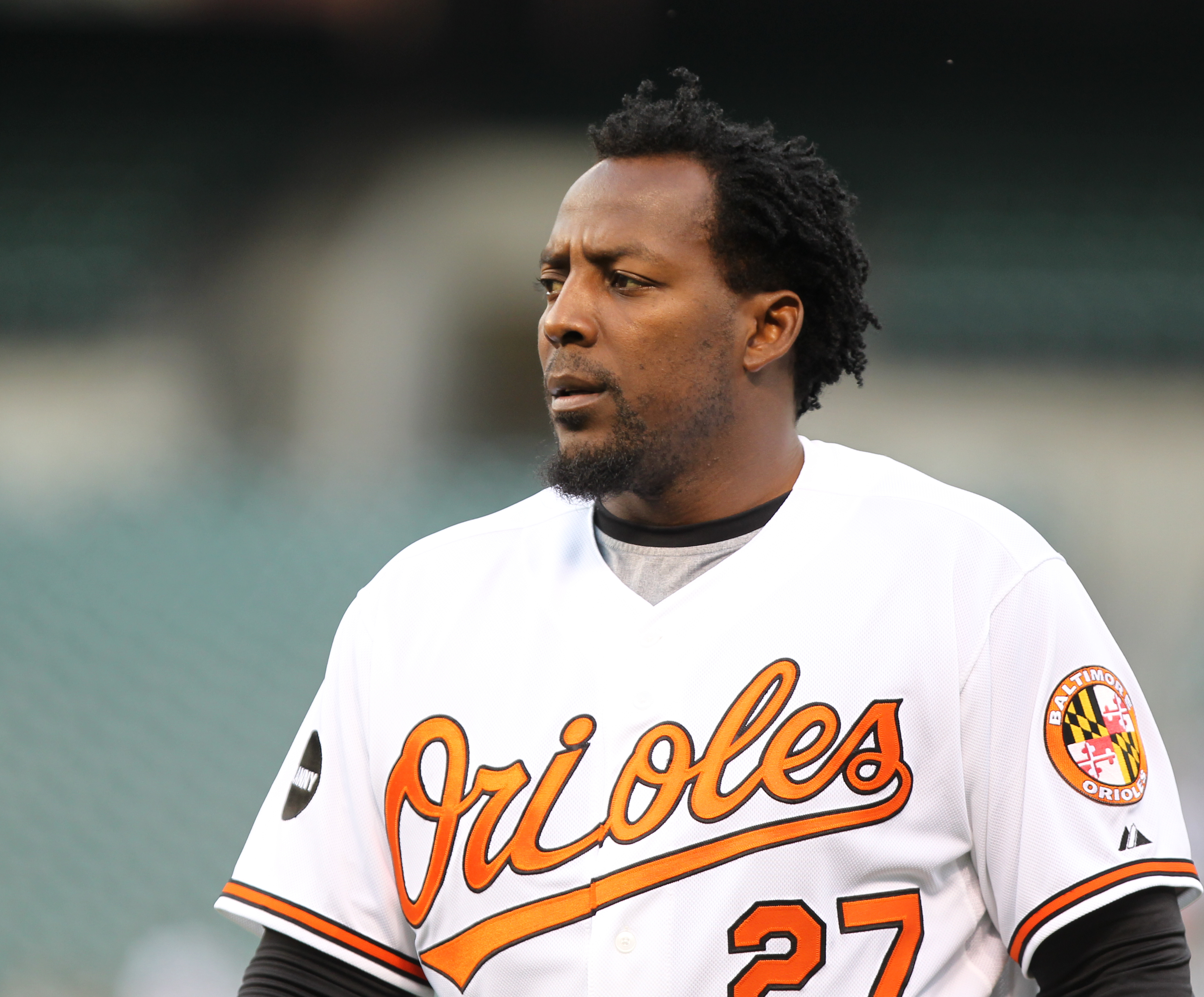
Vladimir Guerrero.

- Armando Gabino
- Balvino Gálvez
- Eddy Garabito
- Frank Garcés
- Amaury García
- Dámaso García
- **Dermis García**
- **Deivi García**
- Edgar García
- Freddy García
- Guillermo García
- **Jarlin Garcia**
- José García
- Leo García
- **Leury García**
- **Luis García Jr.**
- Luis García
- **Luis García**
- Reynaldo Garcia
- Robel García
- **Rony García**
- Willy García
- **Yimi García**
- **Domingo Germán**
- Estéban Germán
- Franklyn Germán
- Gonzalez Germen
- César Gerónimo
- Jerry Gil
- **Luis Gil**
- Alexis Gómez
- Carlos Gómez
- Héctor Gómez
- Mauro Gómez
- Miguel Gómez
- Roberto Goméz
- Sijo Gómez
- Denny González
- **Erik González**
- José González
- Lariel González
- Merandy Gonzalez
- **Oscar Gonzalez**
- Pedro González
- Franklyn Gracesqui
- Alfredo Griffin
- **Deivy Grullón**
- Cecilio Guante
- Reymin Guduan
- Gabriel Guerrero
- Juan Guerrero
- Mario Guerrero
- Pedro Guerrero
- Vladimir Guerrero
- **Vladimir Guerrero Jr.**
- Wilton Guerrero
- José Guillén
- **Jandel Gustave**
- Kelvin Gutiérrez
- Cristian Guzmán
- Domingo Guzmán
- Freddy Guzmán
- Geraldo Guzmán
- Joel Guzmán
- Johnny Guzmán
- **Jorge Guzmán**
- Juan Guzmán
- **Ronald Guzman**
- Santiago Guzmán

== H ==
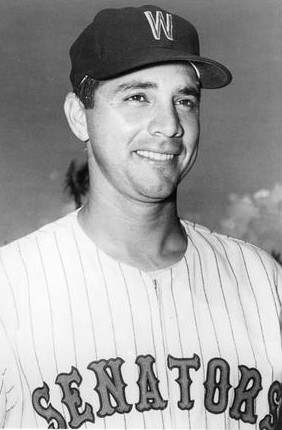
Rudy Hernández.

- Alen Hanson
- **Ronny Henriquez**
- Félix Heredia
- Wilson Heredia
- Anderson Hernández
- Ariel Hernández
- César Hernández
- Diory Hernández
- **Elier Hernández**
- Fernando Hernández
- Jonathan Hernández
- Manny Hernández
- Marco Hernández
- Pedro Hernández
- Roberto Hernández
- Rudy Hernández
- Runelvys Hernández
- **Teoscar Hernández**
- Elián Herrera
- José Herrera
- Kelvin Herrera
- Rosell Herrera

== J ==
- Juan Jaime
- Al Javier
- **Cristian Javier**
- Julián Javier
- Stan Javier
- Domingo Jean
- Williams Jerez
- D'Angelo Jiménez
- **Dany Jiménez**
- **Eloy Jiménez**
- Elvio Jiménez
- José Jiménez
- Juan Jiménez
- Kelvin Jiménez
- Luis Jiménez
- Manny Jiménez
- Ubaldo Jiménez
- Waldis Joaquín
- Félix Jorge
- Félix José
- Rick Joseph
- Julio Rodriguez

== K ==
- **Franklyn Kilome**

== L ==
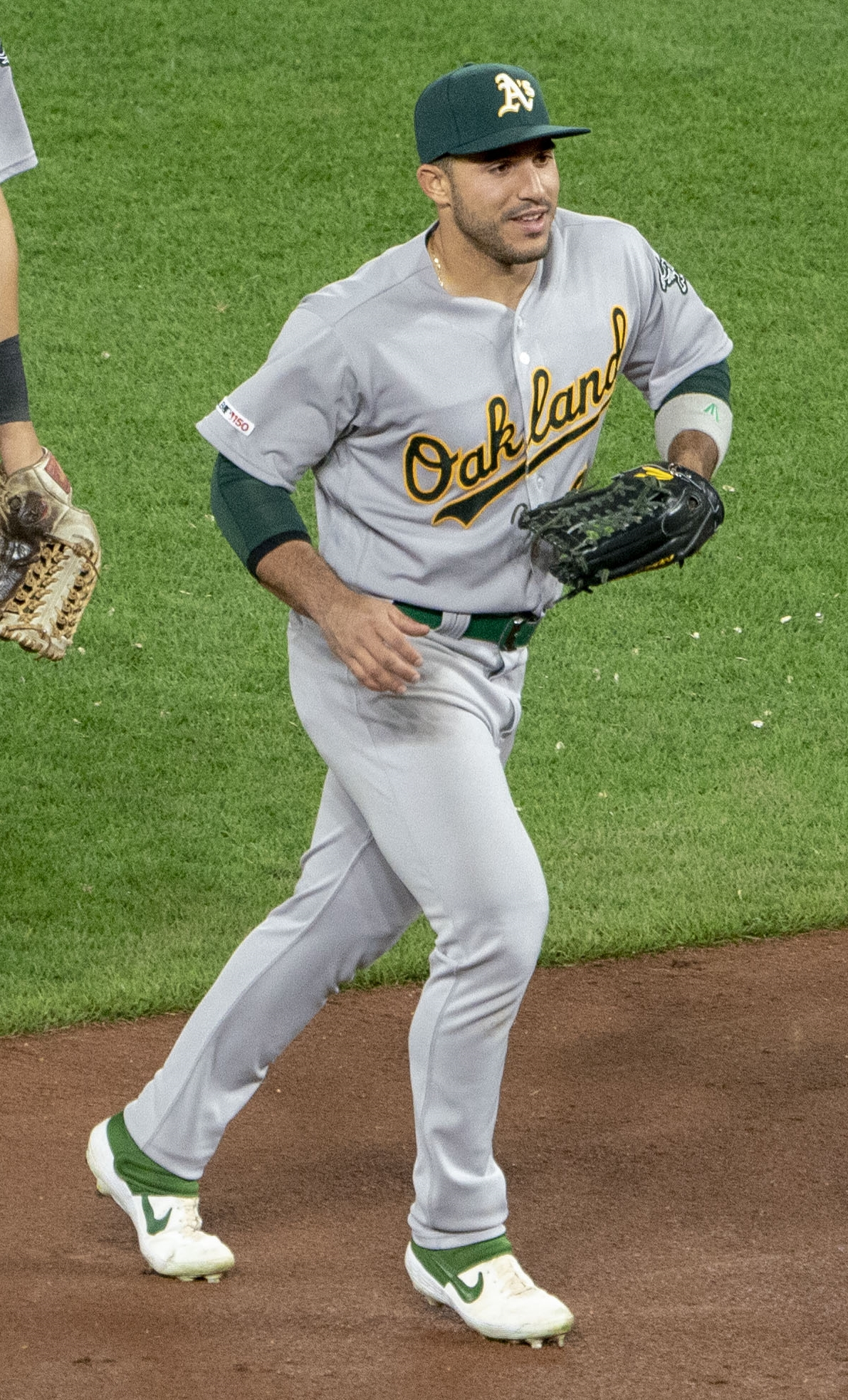
Ramón Laureano.

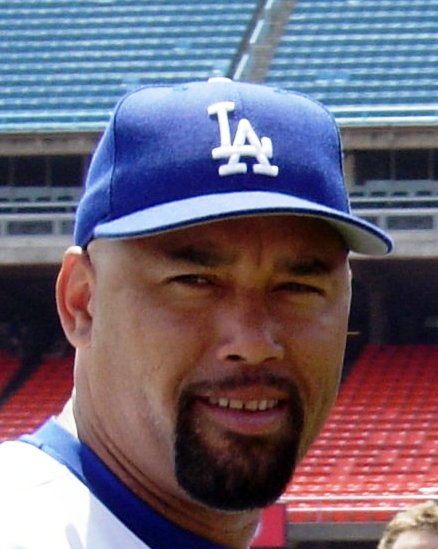
Jose Lima.

- Jairo Labourt
- **Dinelson Lamet**
- **Juan Lagares**
- Junior Lake
- Néstor Lambertus
- Rafael Landestoy
- Enrique Lantigua
- **Ramón Laureano**
- Juan Lara
- Yovanny Lara
- **José Leclerc**
- Manny Lee
- Domingo Leyba
- Robinson Leyer
- **Luis Liberato**
- José Lima
- Rufino Linares
- Francisco Liriano
- Nelson Liriano
- Pedro Liriano
- Rymer Liriano
- Radhames Liz
- Winston Llenas
- Alberto Lois
- Aquilino López
- Mendy López
- Pedro López
- **Otto López**
- **Reynaldo López**
- Elvis Luciano
- Julio Lugo
- Ruddy Lugo
- Héctor Luna

== M ==
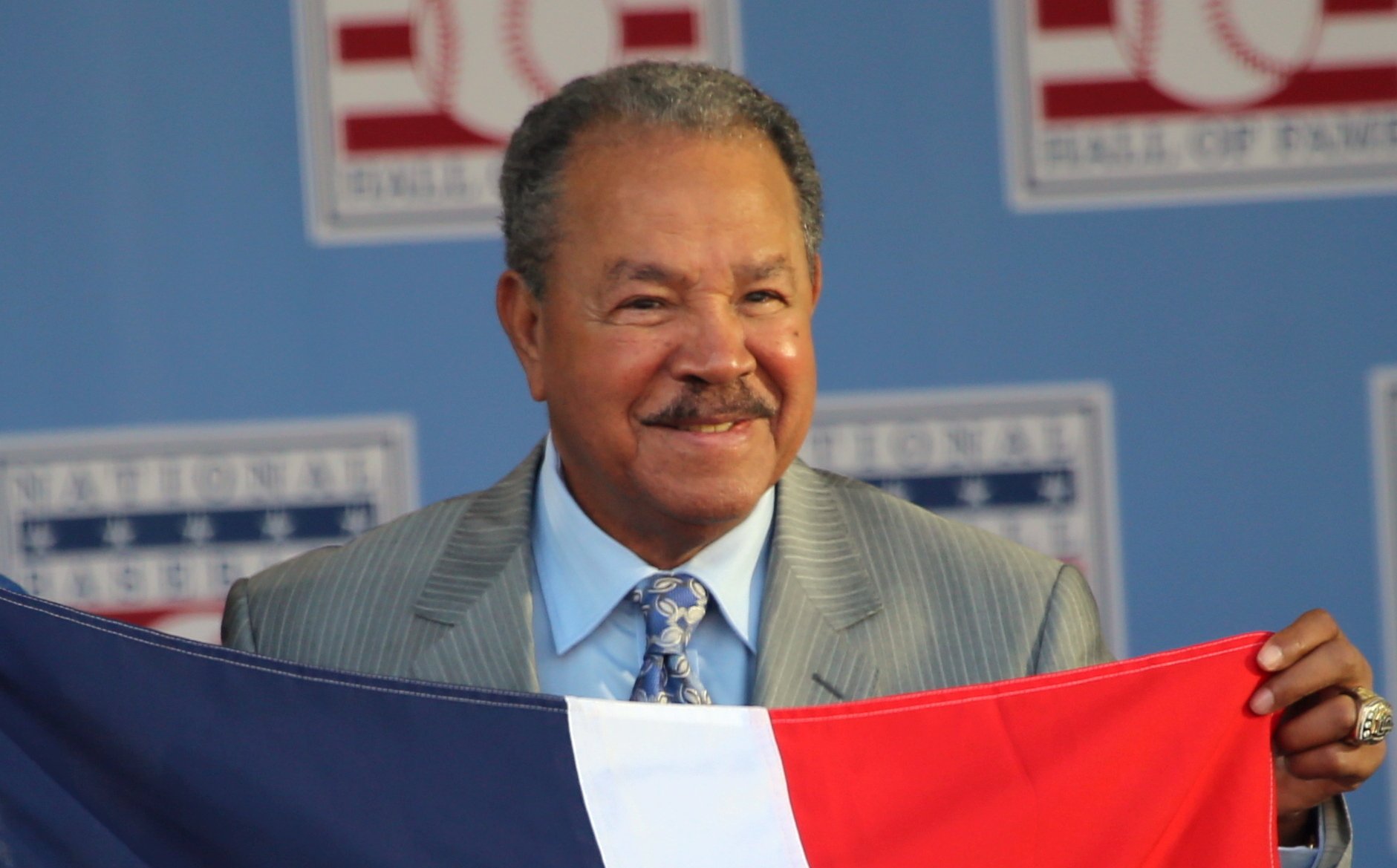
Juan Marichal.

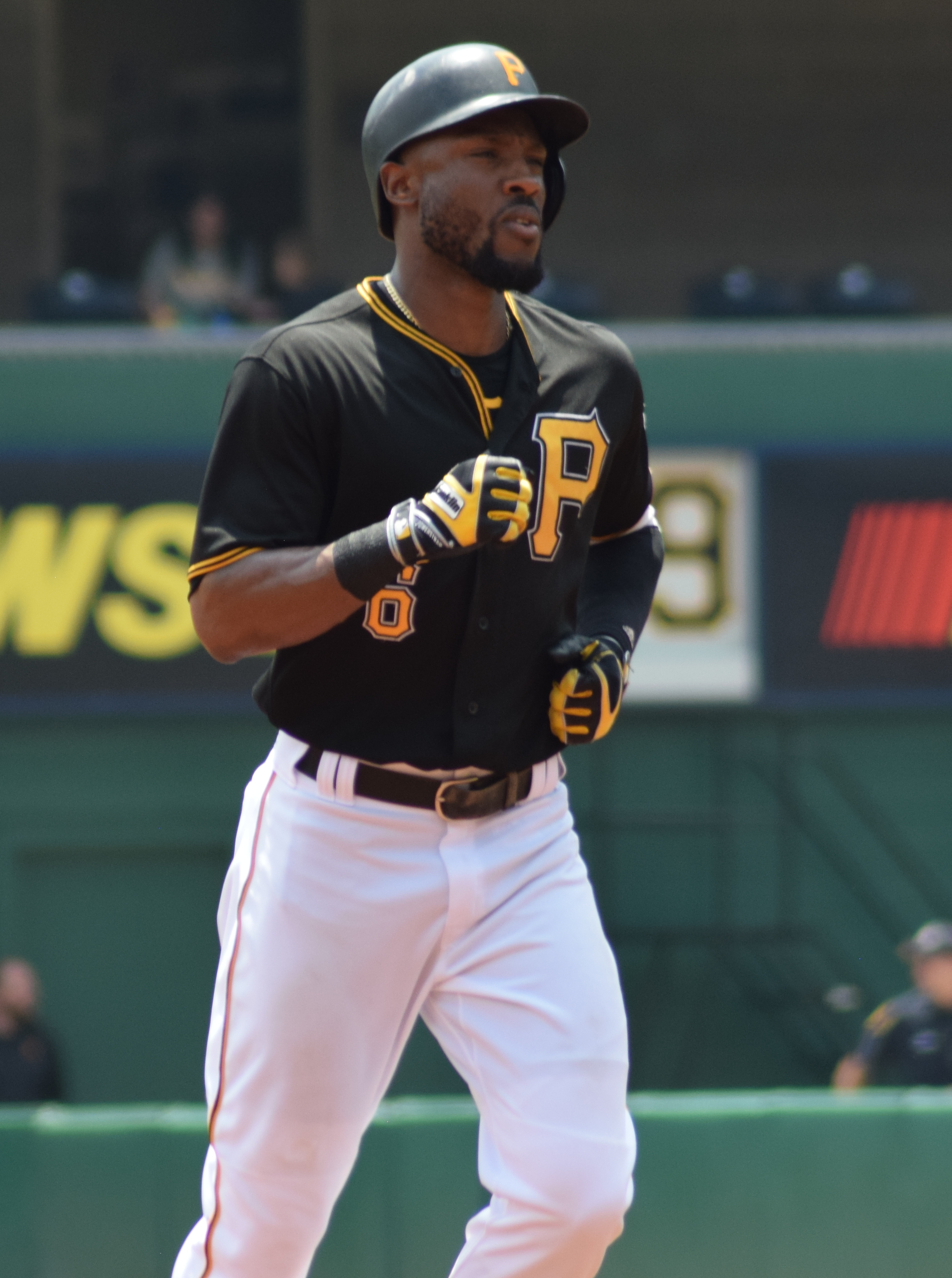
Starling Marte.

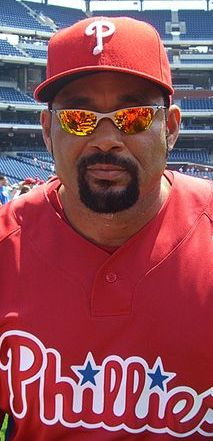
José Mesa.

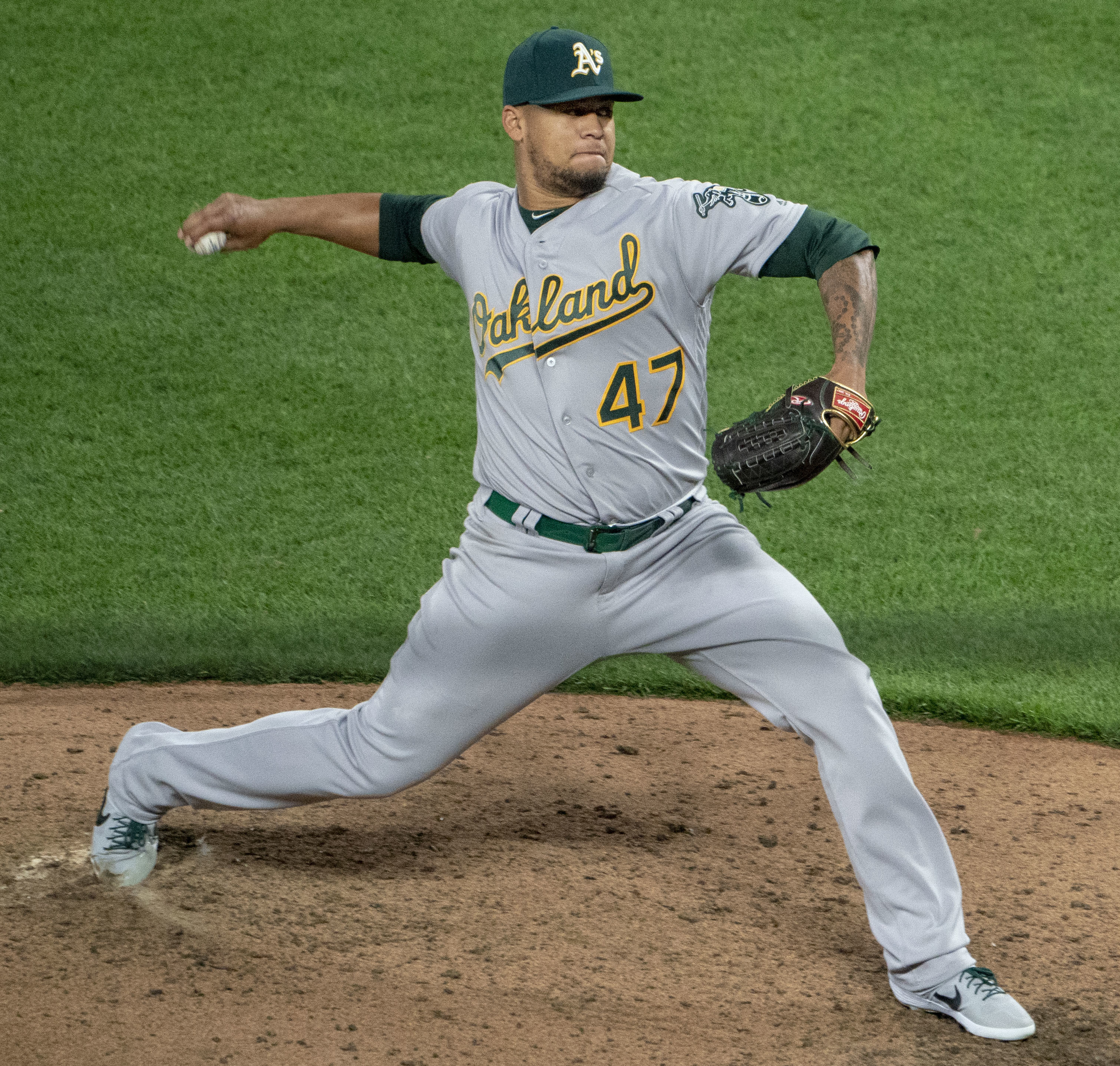
Frankie Montas.

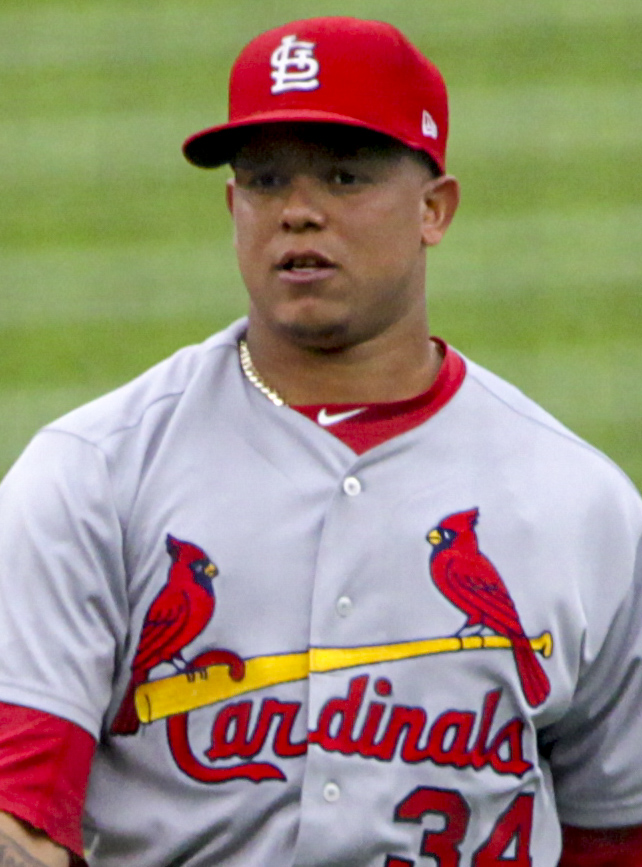
Yairo Muñoz.

- **Manny Machado**
- Warner Madrigal
- Julio Mañón
- Ramón Mañón
- Josías Manzanillo
- Ravelo Manzanillo
- **Manuel Margot**
- Juan Marichal
- Carlos Mármol
- José Marmolejos
- **Brailyn Márquez**
- Alfredo Marte
- Andy Marte
- Dámaso Marte
- Jefry Marté
- **José Marte**
- Kelvin Marte
- **Ketel Marte**
- Luis Marte
- **Starling Marte**
- Víctor Marte
- **Yunior Marte**
- Francis Martes
- Norberto Martín
- Anastacio Martínez
- Carlos Martínez (P, born 1982)
- **Carlos Martínez (P, born 1991)**
- Cristhian Martínez
- Yadier Molina
- Domingo Martínez
- Félix Martínez
- José Martínez
- Luis Martínez
- Manny Martínez
- Michael Martínez
- Pablo Martínez
- Pedro Martínez
- Pedro Martínez Aquino
- Rabbit Martínez
- Ramón Martínez
- Sandy Martínez
- Silvio Martínez
- Ted Martínez
- Víctor Mata
- Henry Mateo
- **Jorge Mateo**
- Juan Mateo
- Julio Mateo
- Marcos Mateo
- Rubén Mateo
- Francisco Matos
- Osiris Matos
- Pascual Matos
- **Nomar Mazara**
- **Adonis Medina**
- Adalberto Mejía
- **Francisco Mejía**
- **J. C. Mejía**
- Jenrry Mejía
- Miguel Mejía
- Roberto Mejía
- Sam Mejías
- Keury Mella
- Juan Melo
- Adalberto Méndez
- Román Méndez
- Henry Mercedes
- José Mercedes
- Luis Mercedes
- Melvin Mercedes
- **Yermín Mercedes**
- José Mesa
- Melky Mesa
- **Keynan Middleton**
- **Juan Minaya**
- **Adalberto Mondesí**
- Raúl Mondesí
- **Frankie Montas**
- Agustín Montero
- **Elehuris Montero**
- **Rafael Montero**
- José Morban
- **Christopher Morel**
- Ramón Morel
- José Moreno
- **Dauri Moreta**
- Juan Morillo
- **Reyes Moronta**
- Andy Mota
- Danny Mota
- Guillermo Mota
- José Mota
- Manny Mota
- Arnie Muñoz
- **Yairo Muñoz**

== N ==
- Yamaico Navarro
- **Héctor Neris**
- Juan Nicasio
- Junior Noboa
- Héctor Noesí
- Jordan Norberto
- Nelson Norman
- Iván Nova
- Roberto Novoa
- Abraham Núñez (IF)
- Abraham Núñez (OF)
- Dedniel Nuñez
- Eduardo Núñez
- Franklin Núñez
- Jhonny Núñez
- José Núñez (right-handed pitcher)
- José Núñez (left-handed pitcher)

== O ==
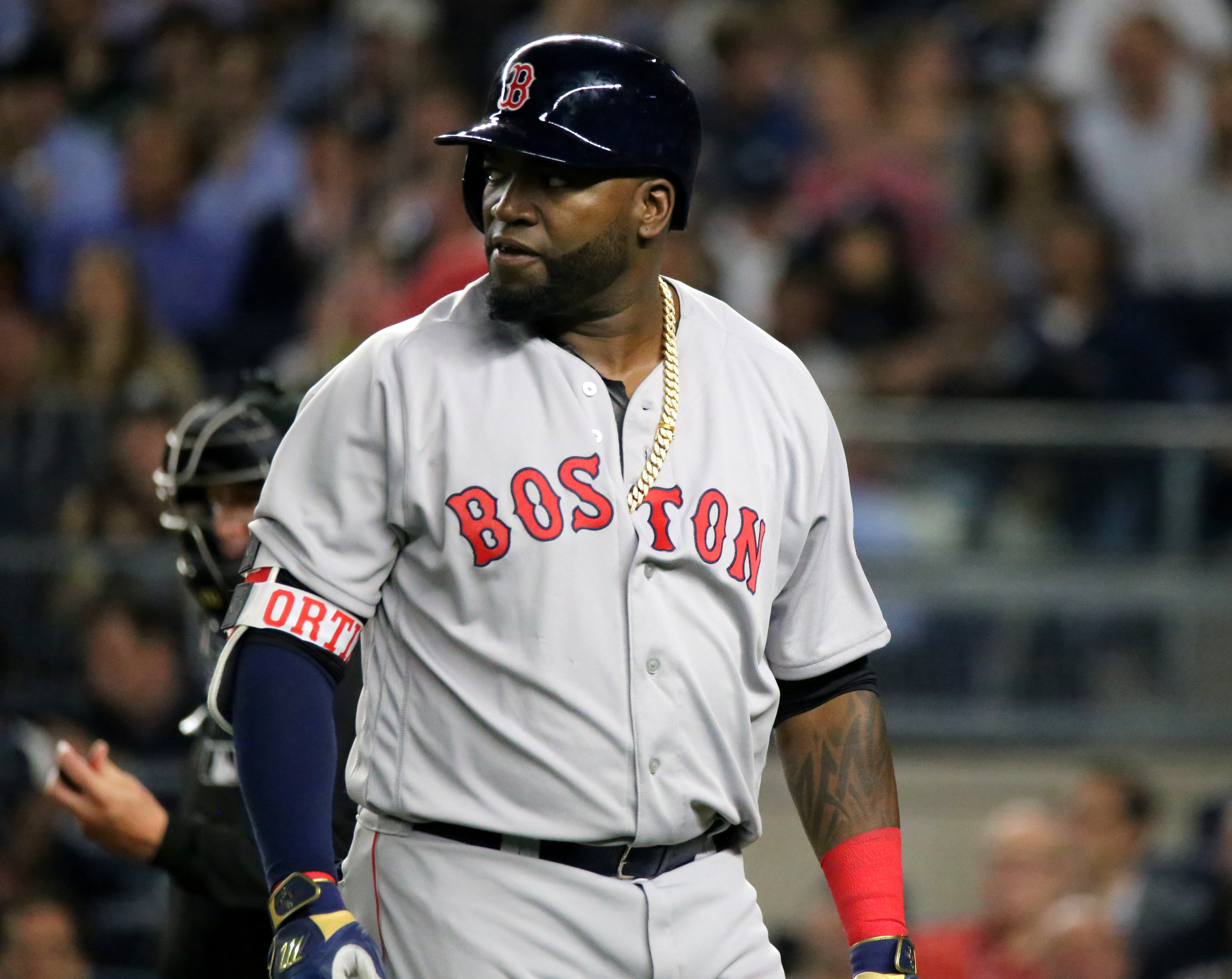
David Ortiz.

- José Offerman
- Alexi Ogando
- **Cristofer Ogando**
- Nefi Ogando
- José Oliva
- Chi-Chi Olivo
- Diomedes Olivo
- Miguel Olivo
- David Ortiz
- José Ortiz
- Luis Ortiz (2B)
- **Luis Ortiz (P), born 1999**
- Ramón Ortiz
- **Oliver Ortega**
- Franquelis Osoria
- Willis Otáñez
- Juan Carlos Oviedo
- **Marcell Ozuna**
- Pablo Ozuna

== P ==
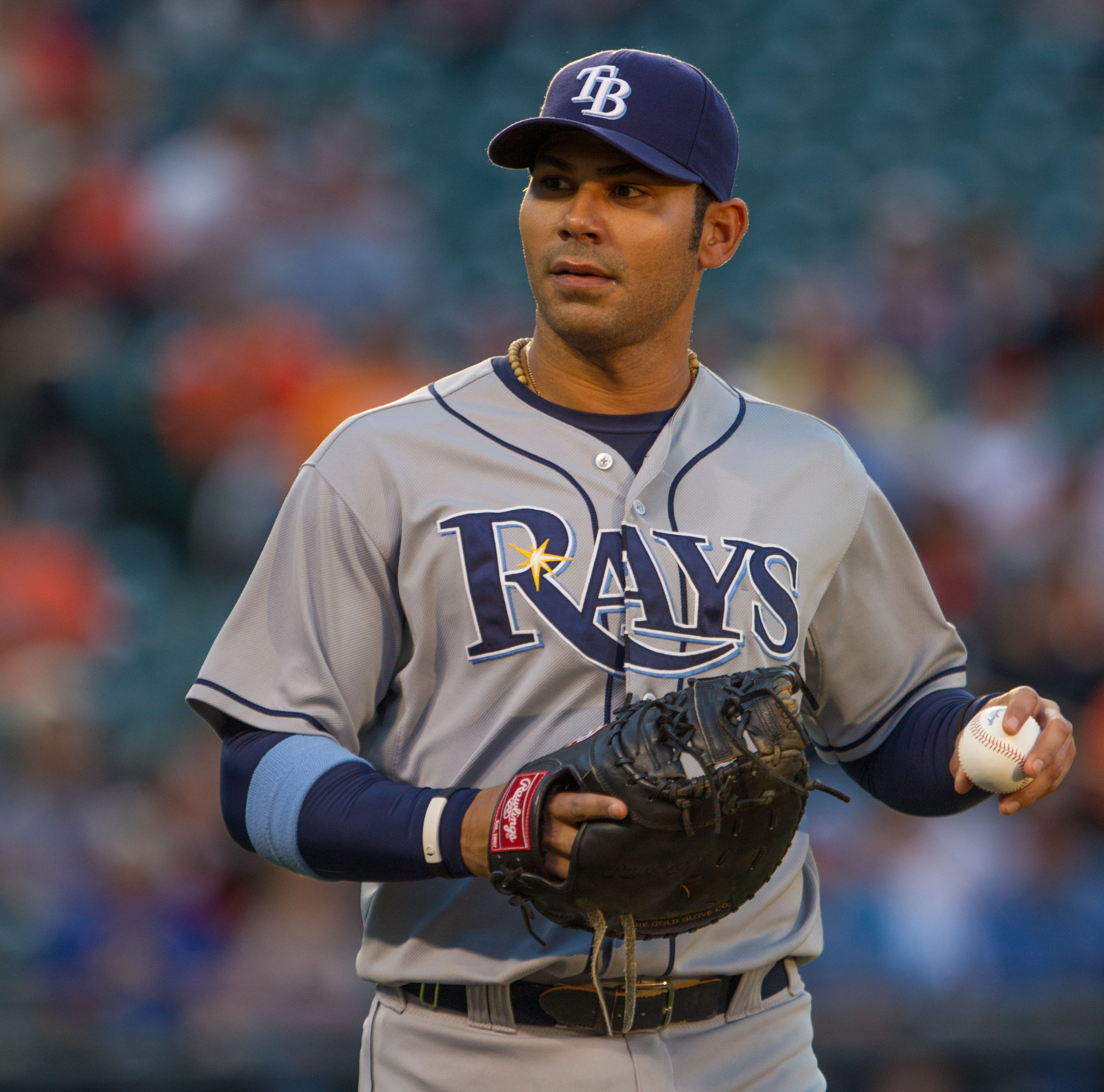
Carlos Peña.

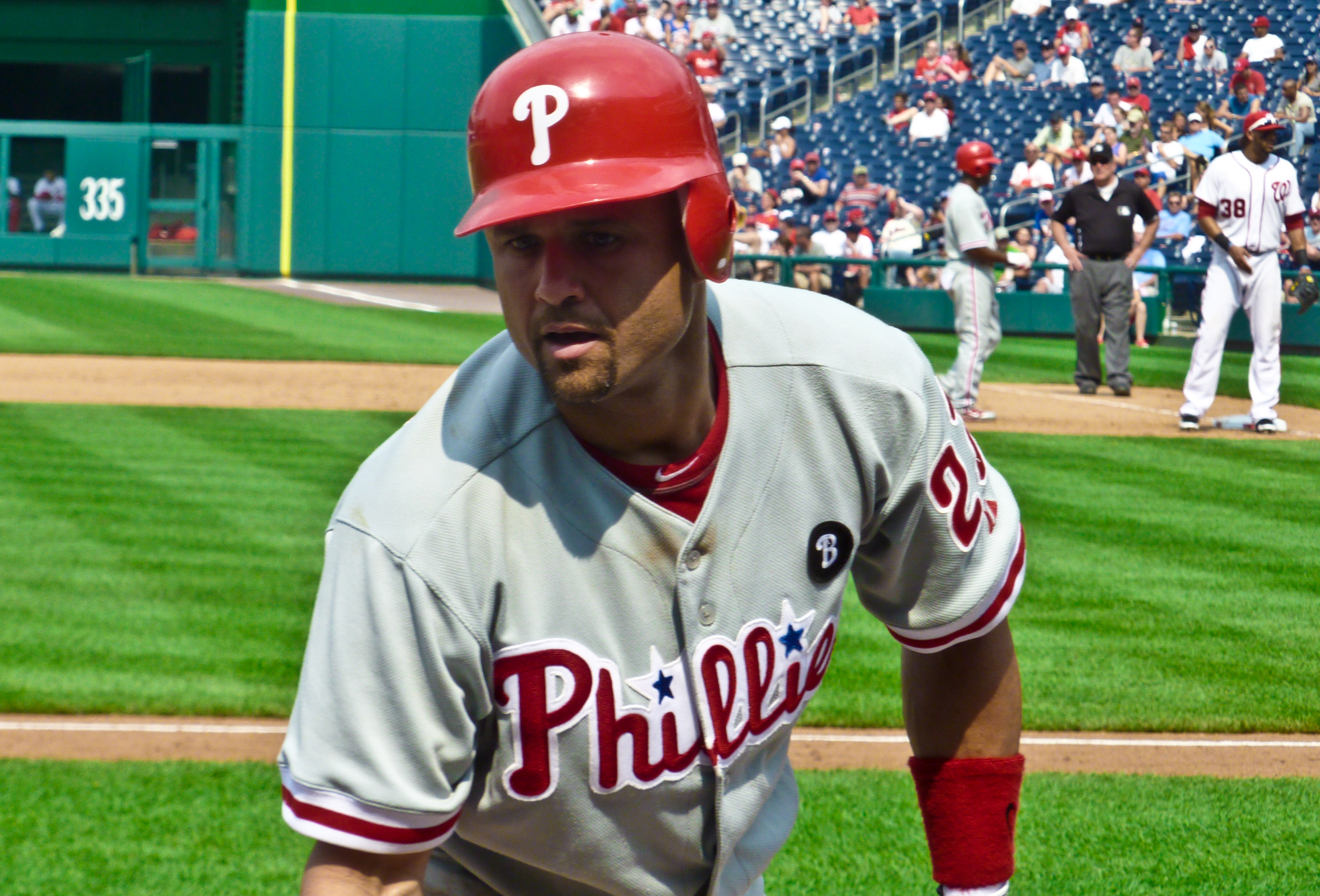
Plácido Polanco.

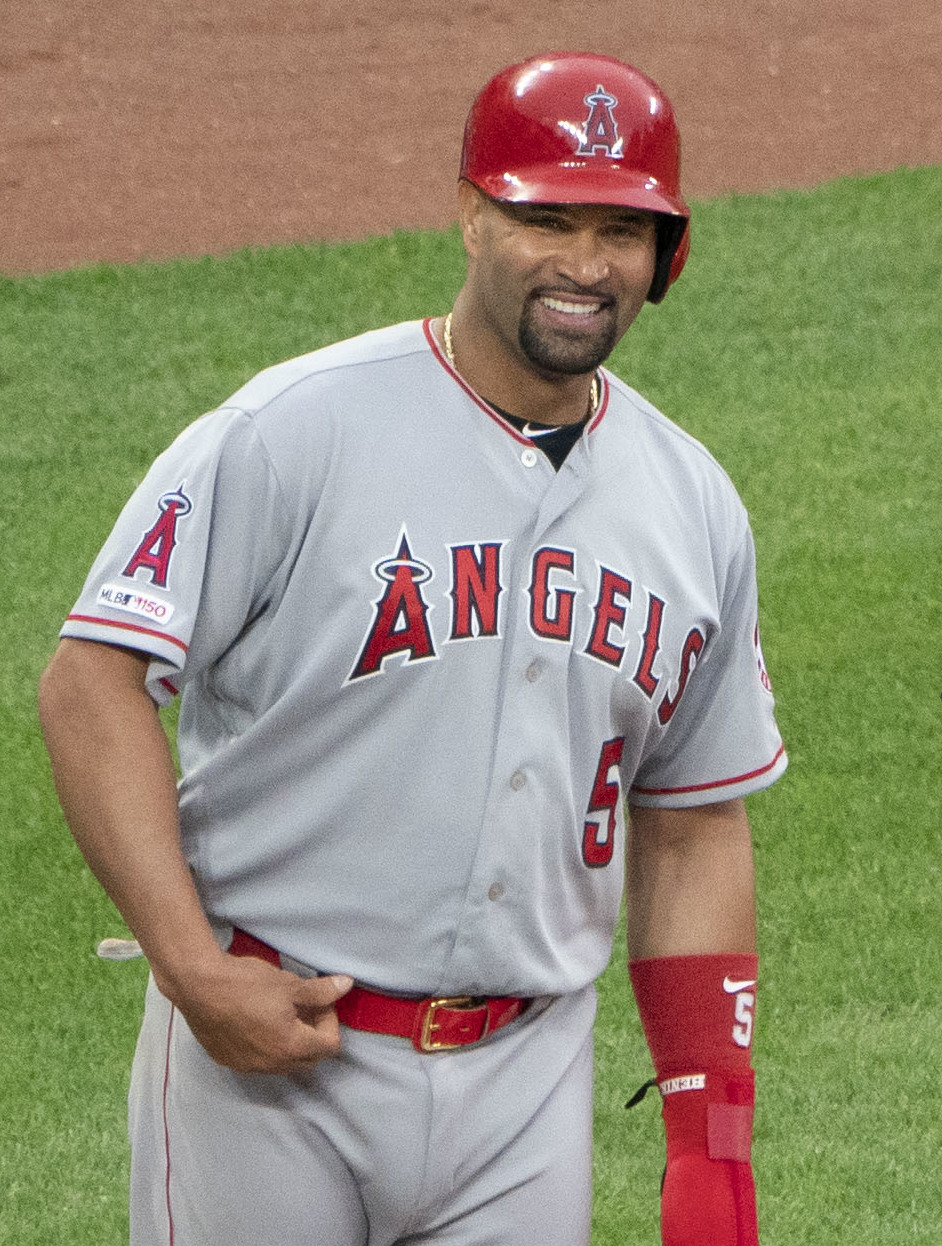
Albert Pujols.

- **Cristian Pache**
- José Paniagua
- Edward Paredes
- **Enoli Paredes**
- Jimmy Paredes
- José Parra
- Felipe Paulino
- Ronny Paulino
- Joel Payamps
- Pedro Payano
- Carlos Peguero
- **Elvis Peguero**
- Francisco Peguero
- Jailen Peguero
- Julio Peguero
- **Liover Peguero**
- Rudy Pemberton
- Alejandro Peña
- Ángel Peña
- Ariel Peña
- Carlos Peña
- Elvis Peña
- **Félix Peña**
- Francisco Peña
- Gerónimo Peña
- Hipólito Peña
- **Jeremy Peña**
- Jesús Peña
- Juan Peña
- Ramón Peña
- Roberto Peña
- Tony Peña (C)
- Tony Peña (IF)
- Tony Peña (P)
- Wily Mo Peña
- **Freddy Peralta**
- Jhonny Peralta
- Joel Peralta
- **Wandy Peralta**
- **Wily Peralta**
- **Ángel Perdomo**
- **Geraldo Perdomo**
- **Luis Perdomo**
- Luis Perdomo
- Antonio Pérez
- Audry Pérez
- Beltrán Pérez
- Carlos Pérez
- Eury Pérez
- **Francisco Pérez**
- Juan Pérez
- Juan Carlos Pérez
- **Héctor Pérez**
- Luis Pérez
- Mélido Pérez
- Neifi Pérez
- Odalis Pérez
- Pascual Pérez
- Rafael Pérez
- Santiago Pérez
- Timoniel Pérez
- Yefri Pérez
- Yorkis Pérez
- Denis Phipps
- Hipólito Pichardo
- Félix Pie
- Stolmy Pimentel
- Luis Pineda
- **Michael Pineda**
- Gregory Polanco
- **Jorge Polanco**
- Plácido Polanco
- Luis Polonia
- Arquimedez Pozo
- César Puello
- **Albert Pujols**
- Luis Pujols

== Q ==
- Rafael Quirico
- **Johan Quezada**

== R ==
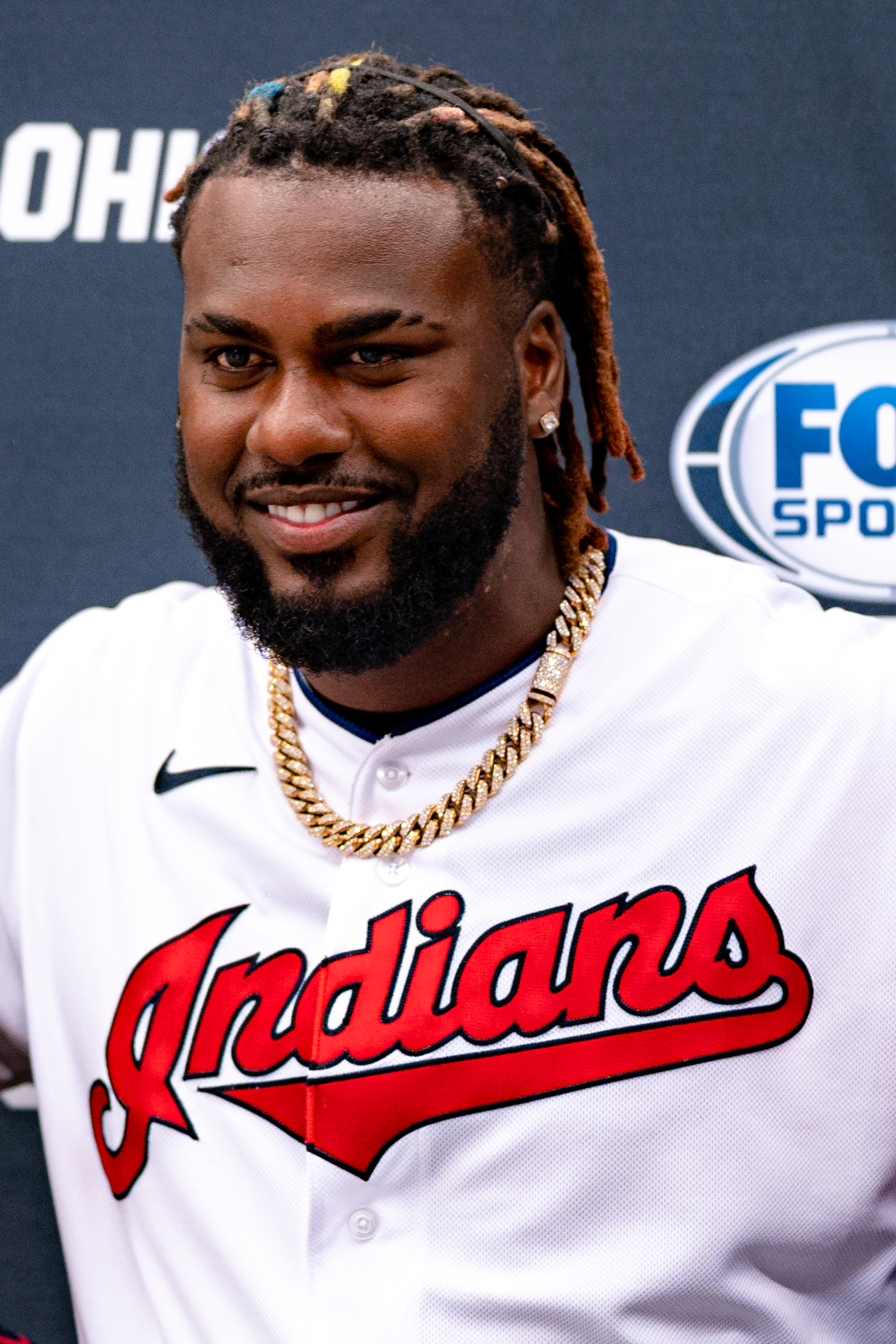
Franmil Reyes

- Carlos Ramírez
- Edwar Ramírez
- Elizardo Ramírez
- Elvin Ramírez
- Hanley Ramírez
- Héctor Ramírez
- **José Ramírez (3B)**
- José Ramírez (P)
- Julio Ramírez
- Manny Ramírez
- Rafael Ramírez
- Ramón Ramírez
- Santiago Ramírez
- Wilkin Ramírez
- Yefry Ramirez
- **Yohan Ramírez**
- Domingo Ramos
- Raudy Read
- Al Reyes
- Alex Reyes
- Alexander Reyes
- Argenis Reyes
- **Denyi Reyes**
- **Franmil Reyes**
- Gilberto Reyes
- José Reyes (C)
- José Reyes (IF)
- Pablo Reyes
- Danny Richar
- José Rijo
- **Webster Rivas**
- Ben Rivera
- Sendy Rleal
- Willis Roberts
- **Hansel Robles**
- Rafael Robles
- **Víctor Robles**
- Fernando Rodney
- Alex Rodríguez
- Aneury Rodríguez
- Eddy Rodríguez
- **Elvin Rodríguez**
- Félix Rodríguez
- Henry Rodríguez
- Jefry Rodríguez
- **Joely Rodríguez**
- **Julio Rodríguez**
- Nerio Rodríguez
- Rafael Rodríguez
- Ricardo Rodríguez
- **Richard Rodríguez**
- Ronny Rodriguez
- Rubén Rodríguez
- **Yerry Rodríguez**
- Wandy Rodríguez
- Ed Rogers
- Esmil Rogers
- Mel Rojas
- José Román
- Enny Romero
- Fernando Romero
- Ramón Romero
- **Angel Rondón**
- Gilberto Rondón
- Rafael Roque
- Adonis Rosa
- Carlos Rosa
- Alberto Rosario
- **Amed Rosario**
- **Eguy Rosario**
- Francisco Rosario
- Mel Rosario
- Randy Rosario
- Rodrigo Rosario
- Sandy Rosario
- Víctor Rosario
- Wilin Rosario
- **Ramón Rosso**
- Wilkin Ruan
- **Esteury Ruiz**

== S ==
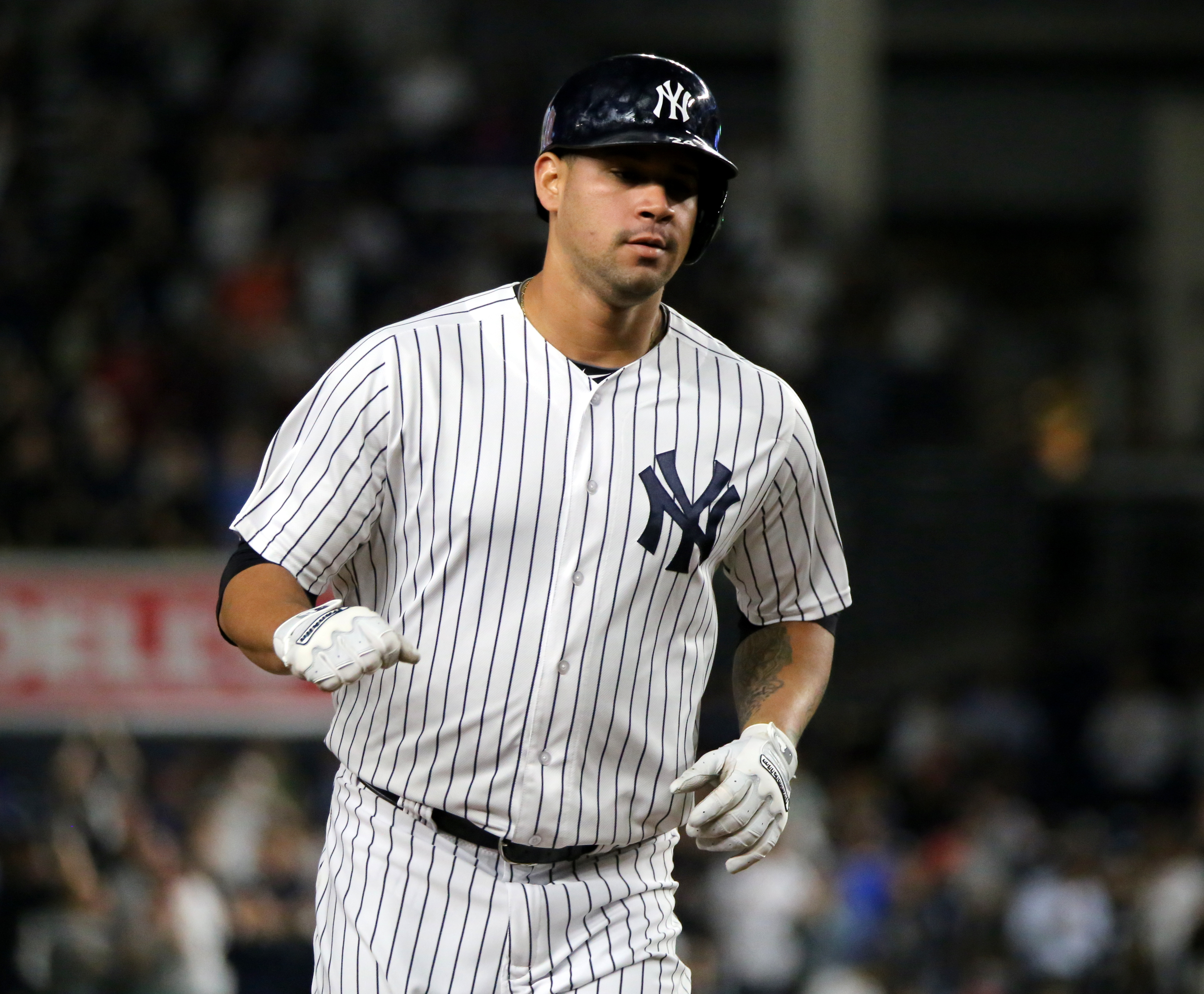
Gary Sánchez

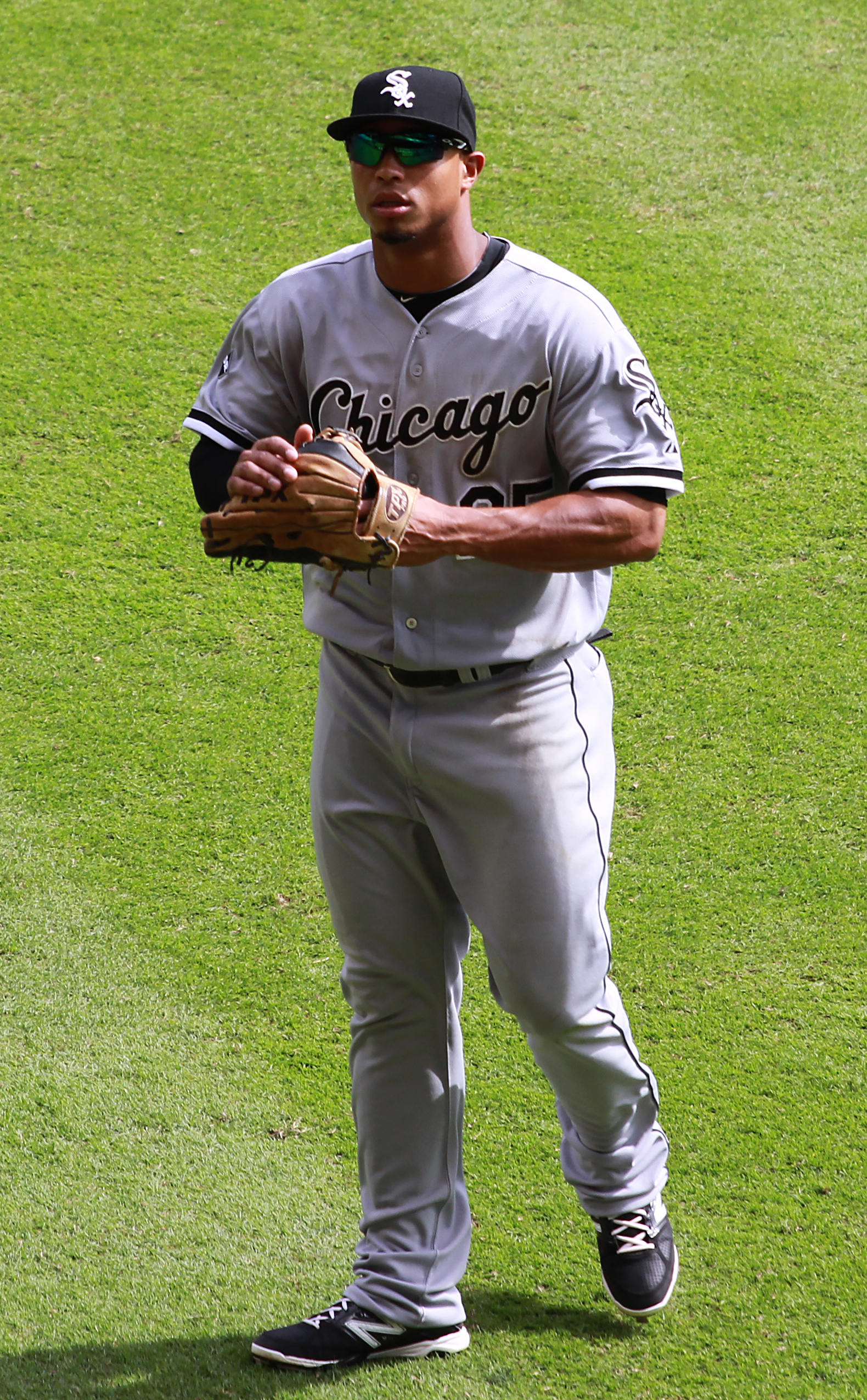
Moisés Sierra

- Juan Salas
- Marino Salas
- **Danny Salazar**
- Ángel Salomé
- Amado Samuel
- Juan Samuel
- Pedro San
- Alejandro Sánchez
- Ángel Sánchez
- Miguel Sánchez
- **Cristopher Sánchez**
- Duaner Sánchez
- Félix Sánchez
- **Gary Sánchez**
- Humberto Sánchez
- Jesús Sánchez
- **Jesús Sánchez OF**
- **Miguel Sanchez**
- **Sixto Sánchez**
- **Miguel Sanó**
- **Alimber Santa**
- Andrés Santana
- **Carlos Santana**
- **Danny Santana**
- **Dennis Santana**
- Domingo Santana
- Edgar Santana
- Ervin Santana
- Julio Santana
- Marino Santana
- Rafael Santana
- Ramón Santiago
- **Antonio Santos**
- Francisco Santos
- **Gregory Santos**
- Luis Santos
- Víctor Santos
- Luis Saturria
- **Jean Segura**
- José Segura
- Leyson Séptimo
- Wascar Serrano
- **Anderson Severino**
- Atahualpa Severino
- **Luis Severino**
- **Pedro Severino**
- **Magneuris Sierra**
- Moisés Sierra
- **José Siri**
- Luis Silverio
- Tom Silverio
- Alfredo Simón
- Julio Solano
- Alfonso Soriano
- José Soriano
- Rafael Soriano
- Elías Sosa
- Henry Sosa
- Jorge Sosa
- José Sosa
- Juan Sosa
- Sammy Sosa
- Gregory Soto
- **Juan Soto**
- Mario Soto
- Pedro Strop
- Wander Suero
- William Suero

== T ==
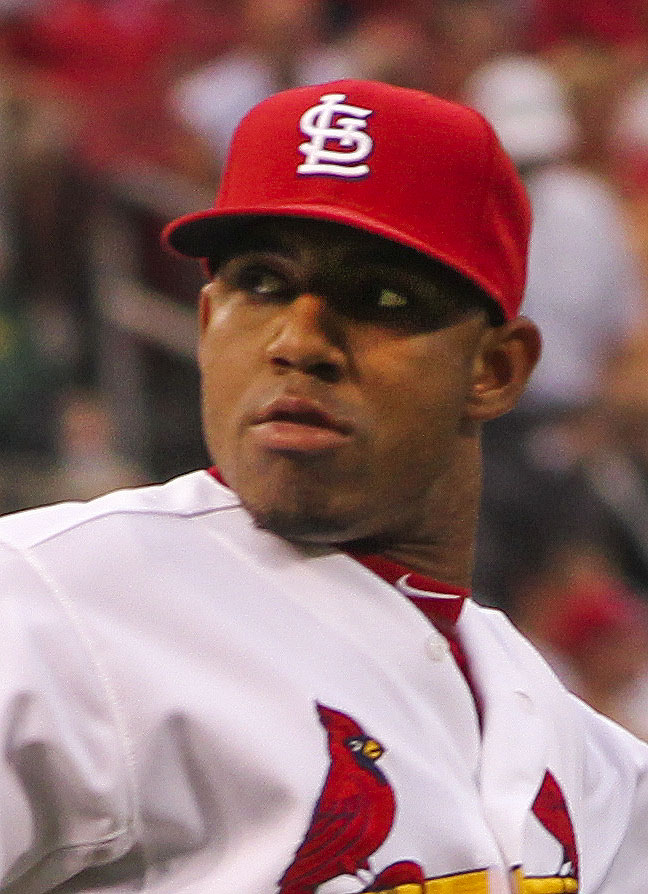
Oscar Taveras

- **Domingo Tapia**
- **Raimel Tapia**
- Fernando Tatís
- **Fernando Tatís Jr.**
- Ramón Tatís
- Jesús Tavárez
- Julián Tavárez
- Alex Taveras
- Frank Taveras
- **Leody Taveras**
- Oscar Taveras
- Willy Taveras
- Miguel Tejada
- Wilfredo Tejada
- Edwin Tavarez
- Anderson Tejeda
- Robinson Tejeda
- Amaury Telemaco
- Luis Terrero
- Andrés Thomas
- Ángel Torres
- Ramón Torres
- Salomón Torres
- Carlos Triunfel
- Ramón Troncoso

== U ==
- **Edwin Uceta**
- **Miguel Ullola**
- **José Ureña**
- **Richard Ureña**
- José Uribe
- Juan Uribe

== V ==
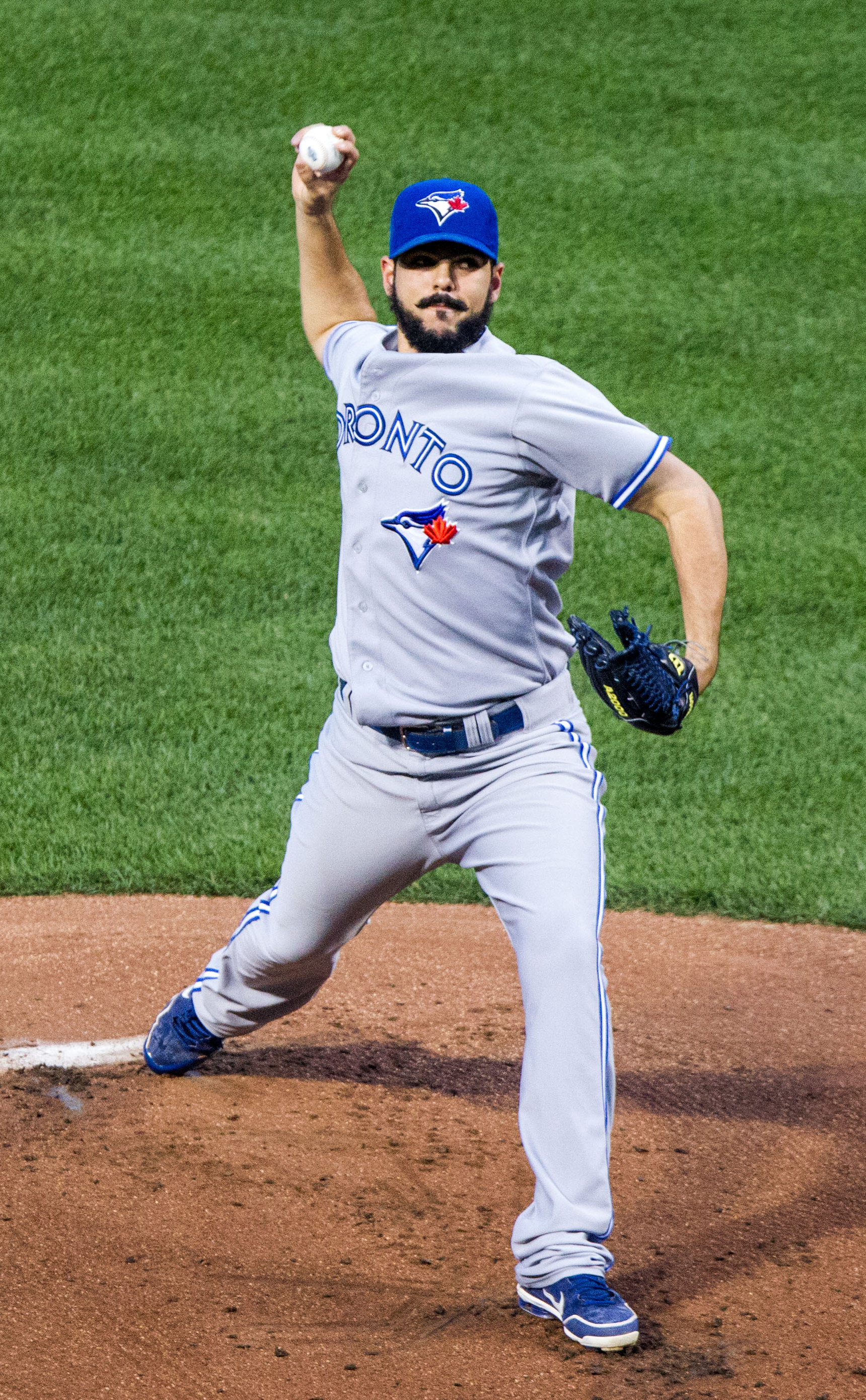
Carlos Villanueva.

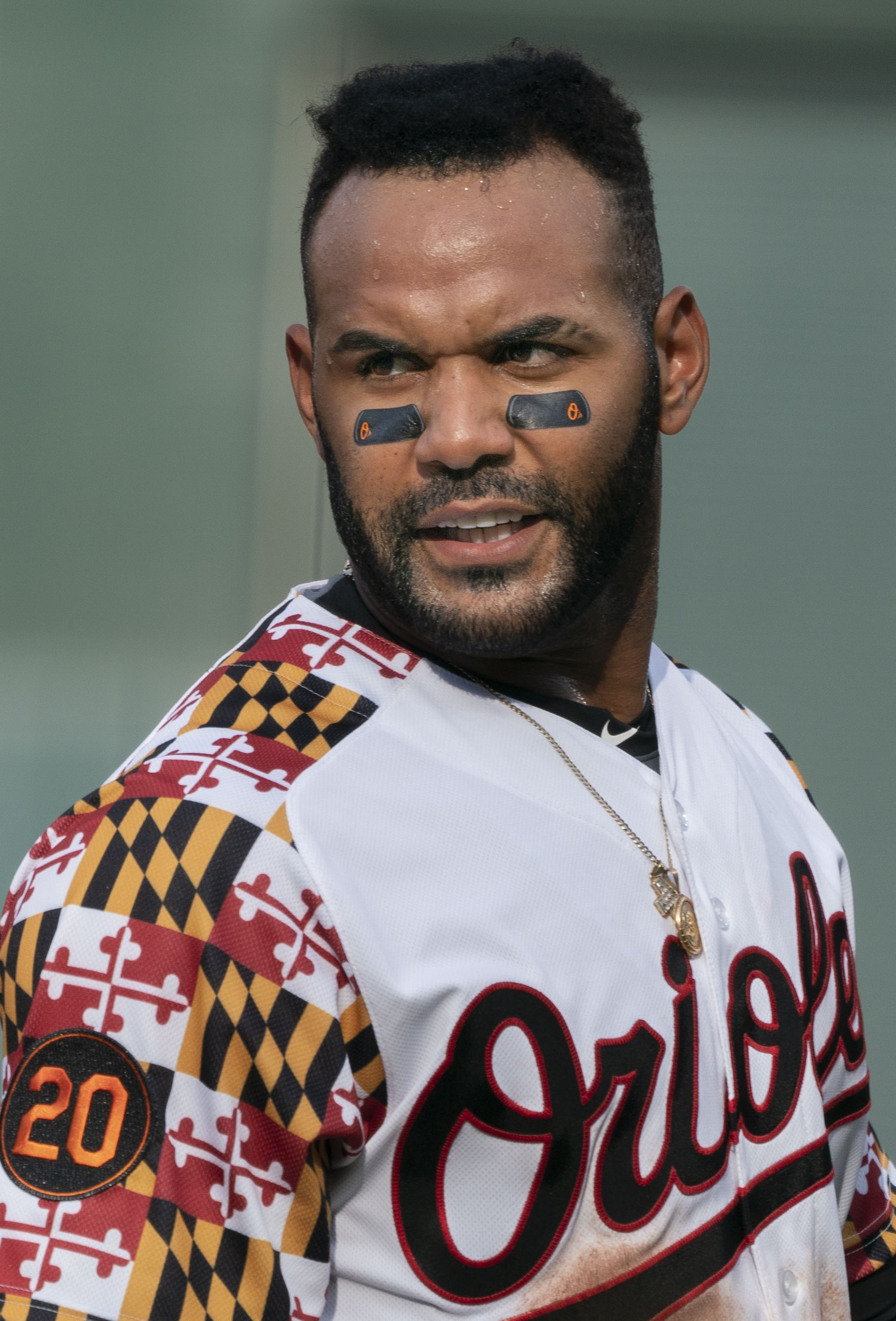
Jonathan Villar.

- Jordany Valdespin
- Carlos Valdez
- César Valdez
- Efrain Valdez
- **Framber Valdez**
- José Valdez
- José Valdez
- Julio Valdez
- Merkin Valdez
- Phillips Valdez
- Rafael Valdez
- Sergio Valdez
- Wilson Valdez
- Yohanny Valera
- José Valverde
- Claudio Vargas
- Tetelo Vargas
- Esmerling Vásquez
- Jorge Vásquez
- Rafael Vásquez
- Freddie Velázquez
- Yordano Ventura
- Darío Veras
- José Veras
- Quilvio Veras
- Wilton Veras
- José Vidal
- Carlos Villanueva
- Henry Villar
- **Jonathan Villar**
- Pedro Viola
- Ozzie Virgil
- **Arodys Vizcaíno**
- José Vizcaíno
- Luis Vizcaíno
- Edinson Vólquez

== W ==
- Héctor Wagner
- Enrique Wilson

== Y ==
- Esteban Yan
- Gabriel Ynoa
- Huascar Ynoa
- Michael Ynoa
- Rafael Ynoa

== Z ==
- **Aneurys Zabala**
