= Ryan O'Malley =

American baseball player (born 1980)

- Pitcher
- Born: April 9, 1980 (age 46); Springfield, Illinois, U.S.
- Batted: Right Threw: Left

MLB debut
- August 16, 2006, for the Chicago Cubs

Last MLB appearance
- August 22, 2006, for the Chicago Cubs

MLB statistics
- Win–loss record: 1–1
- Earned run average: 2.13
- Strikeouts: 4
- Stats at Baseball Reference

Teams
- Chicago Cubs (2006)

Ryan Joseph O'Malley (born April 9, 1980) is an American former Major League Baseball pitcher who played for the Chicago Cubs in 2006.

O'Malley made his major league debut for the Cubs on August 16, 2006, against the Houston Astros. He pitched eight innings, giving up five hits, six walks, two strikeouts and no runs in a 1–0 win. In his next start, he pitched four and two-thirds innings before leaving with a strained left elbow. He was activated from the disabled list on September 8, 2006.

On January 9, 2007, the Cubs announced that O'Malley would be among 11 non-roster players invited to spring training camp in Mesa, Arizona.

In February 2008, O'Malley was signed by the Schaumburg Flyers of the independent Northern League, but before appearing in a game for them, he left to sign a minor league contract with the Chicago White Sox. He became a free agent at the end of the season.

On December 2, 2009, O'Malley was named the pitching coach for the Arizona League Rangers.
