= Sijo Gómez =

Dominican baseball player (born 1900)

- Pitcher
- Born: 13 February 1900; Santiago, Dominican Republic
- Threw: Left

Negro league baseball debut
- 1929, for the Cuban Stars (East)

Last appearance
- 1929, for the Cuban Stars (East)
- Stats at Baseball Reference

Teams
- Cuban Stars (East) (1929)

Rafael Emilio Gómez (13 February 1900 – death date unknown) was a Dominican professional baseball pitcher in the Negro leagues in the 1920s.

A native of Santiago, Dominican Republic, Gómez played for the Cuban Stars (East) in 1929. In 12 recorded appearances, he posted 7.53 ERA over 63.1 innings.
