= Juan Mateo =

Dominican baseball player (born 1982)

- Pitcher
- Born: December 17, 1982 (age 43); Baní, Dominican Republic
- Batted: Right Threw: Right

MLB debut
- August 3, 2006, for the Chicago Cubs

Last MLB appearance
- September 30, 2006, for the Chicago Cubs

MLB statistics
- Win–loss record: 1–3
- Earned run average: 5.32
- Strikeouts: 35
- Stats at Baseball Reference

Teams
- Chicago Cubs (2006)

Juan Manuel Mateo (born December 17, 1982) is a Dominican former professional baseball player. A right-handed starting pitcher, he played part of the 2006 season in Major League Baseball with the Chicago Cubs. He last played for the Vaqueros Laguna in the Mexican League.

== Career ==
During the 2006 season, he was with the Double-A West Tenn Diamond Jaxx until his call-up to the Cubs on August 1. On August 3, Mateo made his major league debut in a start in a game against the Arizona Diamondbacks as he replaced Greg Maddux in the rotation as he had just been traded. Mateo went 5 innings and picked up his first career win.

On May 2, 2008, he refused an assignment to Single-A Daytona and became a free agent. He later signed with the Pittsburgh Pirates, and became a free agent again at the end of the season. On December 22, 2008, he re-signed with the Pirates.

On February 1, 2010, Mateo signed a minor league contract with the Los Angeles Angels of Anaheim, but never pitched in their organization. In 2011, he signed with Vaqueros Laguna.
