= José Reyes (catcher) =

Dominican baseball player (born 1983)

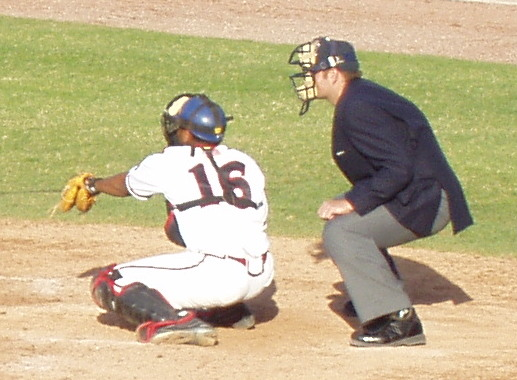
- Reyes (left) with the Lansing Lugnuts in 2003
- Catcher
- Born: February 26, 1983 (age 43); Barahona, Dominican Republic
- Batted: Switch Threw: Right

MLB debut
- September 13, 2006, for the Chicago Cubs

Last MLB appearance
- September 30, 2006, for the Chicago Cubs

MLB statistics
- Batting average: .200
- Home runs: 0
- Runs batted in: 2
- Stats at Baseball Reference

Teams
- Chicago Cubs (2006)

José Ariel Reyes Ramírez (born February 26, 1983) is a Dominican former Major League Baseball (MLB) catcher. He is not related to All-Star shortstop José Reyes.

== Career ==
Reyes was signed by the Chicago Cubs as an amateur free agent in 1999. He reached the major leagues in 2006 with the Cubs, spending part of the season with them. He posted a .200 batting average (1-for-5) with two RBI in four games.
