= Roberto Novoa =

Dominican baseball player (born 1979)

- Relief pitcher
- Born: August 15, 1979 (age 46); Las Matas de Farfán, Dominican Republic
- Batted: Right Threw: Right

MLB debut
- July 29, 2004, for the Detroit Tigers

Last MLB appearance
- September 30, 2006, for the Chicago Cubs

MLB statistics
- Win–loss record: 7–7
- Earned run average: 4.51
- Strikeouts: 115
- Stats at Baseball Reference

Teams
- Detroit Tigers (2004); Chicago Cubs (2005–2006)
Medals
Men's baseball
Representing Dominican Republic
Central American and Caribbean Games
Gold medal – first place	2010 Mayagüez	Team
Intercontinental Cup
Bronze medal – third place	2002 Havana	Team

Roberto Novoa (born August 15, 1979) is a Dominican former professional baseball pitcher. He played in Major League Baseball (MLB) for the Detroit Tigers and Chicago Cubs.

== Minor league career ==
Novoa was signed on July 3, 1999, by the Pittsburgh Pirates as a non-drafted free agent. He played a season of rookie ball in 2000 and spent 2001 with the Single-A Williamsport Crosscutters. On December 16, 2002, he was traded to the Detroit Tigers completing a deal for Randall Simon.

== Major league career ==
Novoa made his major league debut on July 29 against the Chicago White Sox. Eight days later, he earned his first victory against the Boston Red Sox. Novoa entered in relief of Mike Maroth in the sixth inning with the bases loaded and two outs with the Tigers up 3–2. After walking Kevin Youkilis to tie the game, Novoa struck out the next four batters to gain the victory. On February 9, 2005, Novoa was traded to the Chicago Cubs along with minor leaguers Scott Moore and Bo Flowers for Kyle Farnsworth.

He played 49 games for the Cubs in relief in 2005, pitching 44.2 innings with 47 strikeouts. In 2006, he entered 66 games, pitching 76 innings with 53 strikeouts. He was on the disabled list for the entire 2007 season with a shoulder injury.

On October 16, 2007, Novoa was claimed off waivers by the Baltimore Orioles. He was released by the Orioles on July 29, 2008. On July 30, he signed with the San Francisco Giants and became a free agent at the end of the 2008 season. He played briefly for the Diablos Rojos del México of the Mexican League in 2009, appearing in 7 games before being released in April. In 2010, he appeared in 18 games for the Acereros de Monclova, also in the Mexican League. On March 21, 2011, it was announced he signed a deal with the York Revolution.
